= Taekwondo at the 1988 Summer Olympics =

Taekwondo at the Games of the XXIV Olympiad
- Venue: Changchung Gymnasium
- Dates: September 17 to September 20, 1988
- Competitors: 183 from 35 nations

Taekwondo was a demonstration sport at the 1988 Summer Olympics in Seoul. It was the first time that the sport was included in the Olympic program; it would become an official sport twelve years later at the 2000 Games. A total of 120 men and 62 women from 35 nations competed in eight weight classes. Each event featured a single-elimination tournament to determine the winner. Competition was held at the Changchung Gymnasium from September 17 to 20. Fighters from the host nation of South Korea won nine of the sixteen events.

== Men's events ==
=== Finweight (–50 kg) ===
Round of 16
Nassar Al-Otaibi (KUW)
Kwon Tae-Ho (KOR)	PTS
Dario Manca (ITA)	PTS
Mohamed Al-Wabran (KSA)
Enrique Torroella (MEX)	SUP
Harun Ateş (TUR)
Fariborz Danesh (IRI)	SUP
Vicky Rumeon (NED)
Naohito Ishii (JPN)
Hwang Yao-Han (TPE)	PTS
Emilio Azofra (ESP)
Juan Moreno (USA)	DIS
Pascual Pacheco (ECU)
Choi Chan-Ok (FRG)	PTS
Ebenezer Ghansah (GBR)
Bidhan Lama (NEP)	PTS

Quarterfinals
Kwon (KOR)	PTS
Manca (ITA)
Torroella (MEX)	PTS
Danesh (IRI)
Hwang (TPE)
Moreno (USA)	PTS
Choi (FRG)
Lama (NEP)	PTS

Semifinals
Kwon (KOR)	PTS
Torroella (MEX)
Moreno (USA)	PTS
Lama (NEP)

Final
Kwon (KOR)	PTS
Moreno (USA)

=== Flyweight (50–54 kg) ===
Round of 16
Pham Loung (USA)	PTS
Geremia Di Costanzo (ITA)
Stephen Fernandez (PHI)
Ha Tae-Kyung (KOR)	PTS
Bathily Youmousse (CIV)	PTS
Peter Scanlon (AUS)
Ivica Klaić (YUG)
Ihsan Abu-Sheikha (JOR)	PTS
Reinhard Langer (FRG)	PTS
Turgut Uçan (TUR)
Sayed Najem (CAN)
Gabriel Garcia (ESP)	PTS
Éric Pérez (FRA)
Hirokatsu Saito (JPN)	SUP
Adel Darraj (BRN)
Mustapha Moutarazak (NED)	PTS

Quarterfinals
Loung (USA)
Ha (KOR)	PTS
Youmousse (CIV)
Abu-Sheikha (JOR)	PTS
Langer (FRG)
Garcia (ESP)	PTS
Saito (JPN)
Moutarazak (NED)	PTS

Semifinals
Ha (KOR)	PTS
Abu-Sheikha (JOR)
Garcia (ESP)	PTS
Moutarazak (NED)

Final
Ha (KOR)	PTS
Garcia (ESP)

=== Bantamweight (55–58 kg) ===
Round of 16
Ralph Minott (GBR)
Lee Han-Won (USA)	PTS
Ji Yong-Suk (KOR)	PTS
Sakir Bezci (TUR)
Jean Philipp Theas (FRA)	PTS
Johannes Lapre (NED)
Francisco Carvallo (ECU)
Feisal Danesh (IRI)	PTS
Josef Salim (DEN)	PTS
Christian Herberth (FRG)
Federico Gómez (MEX)
Abdalla Al Nagrany (KSA)	PTS
Jose Sanabria (ESP)	BYE

Quarterfinals
Mariusz Zdonek (POL)
Lee (USA)	PTS
Ji (KOR)	PTS
Theas (FRA)
Danesh (IRI)	PTS
Salim (DEN)
Al Nagrany (KSA)
Sanabria (ESP)	PTS

Semifinals
Lee (USA)
Ji (KOR)	PTS
Danesh (IRI)
Sanabria (ESP)	PTS

Final
Ji (KOR)	PTS
Sanabria (ESP)

=== Featherweight (58–64 kg) ===
Round of 16
Ibrahim Al Gafar (KSA)	SUP
Seelan Rengasamy (GBR)
Jesús Tortosa (ESP)	PTS
Manbahadur Tamang (NEP)
Chang Myung-Sam (KOR)	PTS
Alain Kouyate (CIV)
Fred Edenhauser (AUT)
Jeffrey Huber (NED)	INJ
Bernhard Güntner (FRG)
Cengiz Yağiz (TUR)	PTS
Samer Kamal (JOR)	PTS
Dražen Perković (YUG)
Fayez Al-Daihani (KUW)	PTS
Anwar Mohamed (BRN)

Quarterfinals
Katsuhiro Oki (JPN)
Al Gafar (KSA)	SUP
Tortosa (ESP)
Chang (KOR)	PTS
Huber (NED)
Yağiz (TUR)	SUP
Kamal (JOR)	SUP
Al-Daihani (KUW)

Semifinals
Al Gafar (KSA)
Chang (KOR)	RSC
Yağiz (TUR)	PTS
Kamal (JOR)

Final
Chang (KOR)	PTS
Yağiz (TUR)

=== Lightweight (64–70 kg) ===
Round of 16
Park Bong-Kwon (KOR)	SUP
Farag Elemary (EGY)
Jo Kwang Seon (AUS)	SUP
Manuel del Rosario III (PHI)
Greg Baker (USA)	PTS
Dusmane Dauda (NIG)
Franck Cribaillet (FRA)
Lee Jae Hoon (CAN)	PTS
Georg Streif (FRG)
Manuel Jurado (MEX)	PTS
José María Sánchez (ESP)	PTS
Reuben Thijs (NED)
Woiciech Kowalski (POL)	BYE

Quarterfinals
Hirokazu Shiokawa (JPN)
Park (KOR)	PTS
Jo (AUS)
Baker (USA)	PTS
Lee (CAN)
Jurado (MEX)	PTS
Sánchez (ESP)	PTS
Kowalski (POL)

Semifinals
Park (KOR)	PTS
Baker (USA)
Jurado (MEX)
Sánchez (ESP)	PTS

Final
Park (KOR)	PTS
Sánchez (ESP)

=== Welterweight (70–76 kg) ===
Round of 16
Robert Tomasevic (YUG)	PTS
Rashid Al-Owjan (QAT)
Jay Warwick (USA)	PTS
Erich Zaller (AUT)
Osman Senel Ozsoy (TUR)	PTS
Christopher Sawyerr (GBR)
Jeong Kook-hyun (KOR)	PTS
Albert Smythe (CAN)
Piotr Radke (POL)
Wu Tsung-Che (TPE)	SUP
John Wright (ESP)
Abdalla Al Ghamdy (KSA)	PTS
Torsten Gernharot (FRG)
Luigi D' Oriano (ITA)	PTS
Khaled Ibrahim (EGY)	PTS
Ernesto Rodriguez (MEX)

Quarterfinals
Tomasevic (YUG)
Warwick (USA)	PTS
Ozsoy (TUR)
Jeong (KOR)	PTS
Wu (TPE)	PTS
Al Ghamdy (KSA)
D' Oriano (ITA)	PTS
Ibrahim (EGY)

Semifinals
Warwick (USA)
Jeong (KOR)	KO
Wu (TPE)
D' Oriano (ITA)	PTS

Final
Jeong (KOR)	RSC
D' Oriano (ITA)

=== Middleweight (76–83 kg) ===
Round of 16
Sami Garba (NIG)
Markus Woznicki (FRG)	PTS
Hasan Zahedi (IRI)
David Fraser (GBR)	DIS
Miguel Jordan (ESP)	PTS
Leendert Verweij (NED)
Amr Hussein (EGY)	PTS
Mounir Boukrouh (FRA)
Na Im Hasan (USA)	PTS
Waleed Al-Hashash (BRN)
Lee Kye-Haeng (KOR)	PTS
Fernando Jaramillo (ECU)
Ferrere Clerveaux (CAN)
Metin Sahin (TUR)	SUP
Patrick Remark (CIV)
Salem Al Zahrany (KSA)	WDR

Quarterfinals
Woznicki (FRG)	PTS
Fraser (GBR)
Jordan (ESP)
Hussein (EGY)	PTS
Hasan (USA)
Lee (KOR)	PTS
Sahin (TUR)	SUP
Al Zahrany (KSA)

Semifinals
Woznicki (FRG)
Hussein (EGY)	PTS
Lee (KOR)	SUP
Sahin (TUR)

Final
Hussein (EGY)
Lee (KOR)	PTS

=== Heavyweight (+83 kg) ===
Round of 16
José Luis Álvarez (es) (ESP)	PTS
Robert Fellner (ISV)
Jimmy Kim (USA)	PTS
Ali Sahin (TUR)
Mansour Bagheri (IRI)	PTS
Alex Russel Da-Rocha (GHA)
Ali Mohamed Salah (QAT)
Kim Jong-Suk (KOR)	PTS
Rashid Hassan Bado (BRN)
Henk Meijer (NED)	PTS
Michael Arndt (FRG)	BYE

Quarterfinals
Tonny Sorensen (DEN)
Alvarez (ESP)	PTS
Kim (USA)	PTS
Bagheri (IRI)
Moustafa Elabrak (EGY)
Kim (KOR)	SUP
Meijer (NED)
Arndt (FRG)	PTS

Semifinals
Alvarez (ESP)
Kim (USA)	PTS
Kim (KOR)	PTS
Arndt (FRG)

Final
Kim (USA)	PTS
Kim (KOR)

== Women's events ==
=== Finweight (–43 kg) ===
Quarterfinals
Vasugi Marathamuthu (MAS)	SUP
Cheryl Kalanoc (USA)
Chin Yu-Fang (TPE)	SUP
Kirsten Demanser (NZL)
Monica Torres (MEX)	SUP
Regina Singer (AUT)
Rosa Moreno (ESP)
Lee Hwa-Jin (KOR)	SUP

Semifinals
Marathamuthu (MAS)
Chin (TPE)	PTS
Torres (MEX)
Lee (KOR)	PTS

Finals
Chin (TPE)	PTS
Lee (KOR)

=== Flyweight (43–47 kg) ===
Quarterfinals
Mayumi Pejo (USA)	PTS
Sari Febriana (INA)
Maria Angela Naranjo (ESP)	SUP
Bettina Engelking (FRG)
Veronika Six (AUT)
Choo Nan-Yool (KOR)	PTS
Pai Yun-Yao (TPE)	PTS
Yong PoPo (MAS)

Semifinals
Pejo (USA)
Naranjo (ESP)	PTS
Choo (KOR)	PTS
Pai (TPE)

Finals
Naranjo (ESP)
Choo (KOR)	PTS

=== Bantamweight (47–51 kg) ===
Quarterfinals
Josefina Lopez (ESP)	PTS
Lisbeth Larsen (DEN)
Maniit Bumarh (CAN)
Debra Holloway (USA)	PTS
Park Sun-Young (KOR)	PTS
Chai Saew Yuen (MAS)
Chen Yi-An (TPE)	PTS
Roberta Parisella (ITA)

Semifinals
Lopez (ESP)
Holloway (USA)	SUP
Park (KOR)
Chen (TPE)	PTS

Finals
Holloway (USA)
Chen (TPE)	PTS

=== Featherweight (51–55 kg) ===
Quarterfinals
Kim Dotson (USA)
Kim So-Young (KOR)	PTS
Virna Shinta Bolang (INA)
Annemette Christensen (DEN)	PTS
Zuleytan Tan (TUR)	PTS
Tung Ya-Ling (TPE)
Amparo Dols (ESP)	PTS
Rosemary Wilson (NZL)

Semifinals
Kim (KOR)
Christensen (DEN)	SUP
Tan (TUR)	SUP
Dolls (ESP)

Finals
Christensen (DEN)	SUP
Tan (TUR)

=== Lightweight (55–60 kg) ===
Quarterfinals
Dana Hee (USA)	PTS
Ong Bee Eng (MAS)
Chen Jiun-Feng (TPE)	SUP
Lee Eun-Young (KOR)
Blena Benitez (ESP)
Jolanda van Duren (NED)	SUP
Yvonne Tillmann (FRG)
Karin Schwartz (DEN)	SUP

Semifinals
Hee (USA)	SUP
Chen (TPE)
Van Duren (NED)
Schwartz (DEN)	SUP

Finals
Hee (USA)	SUP
Schwartz (DEN)

=== Welterweight (60–65 kg) ===
Quarterfinals
Deborah Washington (ISV)
Arlene Limas (USA)	RSC
Sonny Seidel (FRG)	PTS
Sabina Luciani (DEN)
Kim Ji-Sook (KOR)	PTS
Tessa Gordon (CAN)

Semifinals
Coral Bistuer (ESP)
Limas (USA)	PTS
Seidel (FRG)
Kim (KOR)	PTS

Finals
Limas (USA)	PTS
Kim (KOR)

=== Middleweight (65–70 kg) ===
Quarterfinals
Tami Noel (ISV)
Margaretha De Jongh (NED)	PTS
Sharon Jewell (USA)	PTS
Marcie King (CAN)
Bronwyn Wilson (NZL)
Kim Hyun-hee (KOR)	SUP
Michaela Huber (AUT)
Elena Navaz (ESP)	SUP

Semifinals
De Jongh (NED)	PTS
Jewell (USA)
Kim (KOR)	PTS
Navaz (ESP)

Finals
De Jongh (NED)
Kim (KOR)	SUP

=== Heavyweight (+70 kg) ===
Quarterfinals
Yolanda Santana (ESP)
Lynnette Love (USA)	PTS
Ute Guester (FRG)	SUP
Christine Six (AUT)
Susan Graham (NZL)
Yvonne Franssen (CAN)	PTS
Phillicia Sprauve (ISV)
Jang Yoon-Jung (KOR)	PTS

Semifinals
Love (USA)	SUP
Guester (FRG)
Franssen (CAN)
Jang (KOR)	PTS

Finals
Love (USA)	PTS
Jang (KOR)

== Abbreviations ==
- DIS — Opponent did not participate in weigh-in
- KO — Won by Knock-Out
- INJ — Won by opponent Injury
- PTS — Won by Points
- RSC — Won by Referee Stopping the Contest
- SUP — Won by Superiority
- WDR — Won by opponent Withdrawal

== Medals ==
#	NOC	1	2	3	Total
1	South Korea	9	4	2	16
2	United States	4	2	5	11
4	Chinese Taipei	2	0	3	5
4	Denmark	1	1	0	2
5	Spain	0	4	5	9
6	Turkey	0	2	1	3
7	Netherlands	0	1	1	2
8	Egypt	0	1	0	1
8	Italy	0	1	0	1
10	Germany	0	0	4	4
11	Mexico	0	0	3	3
12	Jordan	0	0	2	2
13	Saudi Arabia	0	0	1	1
13	Bahrain	0	0	1	1
13	Canada	0	0	1	1
13	Iran	0	0	1	1
13	Malaysia	0	0	1	1
13	Nepal	0	0	1	1
