= 1988 Asian Taekwondo Championships =

- Venue: Dasharath Rangasala
- Location: Kathmandu, Nepal
- Dates: 23–25 March 1988

Champions
- Men: South Korea
- Women: South Korea

The 1988 Asian Taekwondo Championships were the 8th edition of the Asian Taekwondo Championships, and were held in Kathmandu, Nepal from 23 to 25 March, 1988.

== Medal summary ==
=== Men ===
Event	Gold	Silver	Bronze
Finweight (−50 kg)	Kwon Tae-ho; South Korea	Bidhan Lama; Nepal	Paul Lyons; Australia
Finweight (−50 kg)	Kwon Tae-ho; South Korea	Bidhan Lama; Nepal	Firas Al-Jayousi; Jordan
Flyweight (−54 kg)	Ha Tae-kyung; South Korea	Ihsan Abu Sheikha; Jordan	Hwang Yao-han; Chinese Taipei
Flyweight (−54 kg)	Ha Tae-kyung; South Korea	Ihsan Abu Sheikha; Jordan	Mike Ventosa; Philippines
Bantamweight (−58 kg)	Cho Young-nam; South Korea	Chuang hsiao-yung Chinese Taipei	Stephen Fernandez; Philippines
Bantamweight (−58 kg)	Cho Young-nam; South Korea	Chuang hsiao-yung Chinese Taipei	Ebrahim Qhaib; Qatar
Featherweight (−64 kg)	Chang Myung-sam; South Korea	Tzan Shih-song; Chinese Taipei	Yeung Ying Kwan; Hong Kong
Featherweight (−64 kg)	Chang Myung-sam; South Korea	Tzan Shih-song; Chinese Taipei	Samir Jaber; Jordan
Lightweight (−70 kg)	Park Bong-kwon; South Korea	Chen Yi-hsiung; Chinese Taipei	Hussein Simrin; Jordan
Lightweight (−70 kg)	Park Bong-kwon; South Korea	Chen Yi-hsiung; Chinese Taipei	Jo Jin-ho; Australia
Welterweight (−76 kg)	Jeong Kook-hyun; South Korea	Wu Tsung-che; Chinese Taipei	Hirokazu Shiokawa; Japan
Welterweight (−76 kg)	Jeong Kook-hyun; South Korea	Wu Tsung-che; Chinese Taipei	Ali Hajipour; Iran
Middleweight (−83 kg)	Jeong Yong-suk; South Korea	Hayder Yousif; Iraq	Joalberto Pamintuan; Philippines
Middleweight (−83 kg)	Jeong Yong-suk; South Korea	Hayder Yousif; Iraq	Liu Chien-chung; Chinese Taipei
Heavyweight (+83 kg)	Kim Jong-suk; South Korea	Chong Fu Chik; Hong Kong	Shieh Rong-tzong; Chinese Taipei
Heavyweight (+83 kg)	Kim Jong-suk; South Korea	Chong Fu Chik; Hong Kong	Ali Mohamed Salah; Qatar

=== Women ===
Event	Gold	Silver	Bronze
Finweight (−43 kg)	Lee Hwa-jin; South Korea	Chin Yu-fang; Chinese Taipei	Bronwyn Butterworth; Australia
Finweight (−43 kg)	Lee Hwa-jin; South Korea	Chin Yu-fang; Chinese Taipei	Shima Khadka; Nepal
Flyweight (−47 kg)	Pai Yun-yao; Chinese Taipei	Wong Liang Ming; Singapore	Cheryl Smith; Australia
Flyweight (−47 kg)	Pai Yun-yao; Chinese Taipei	Wong Liang Ming; Singapore	Sita Kumari Rai; Nepal
Bantamweight (−51 kg)	Park Sun-young; South Korea	Carmela Hartnett; Australia	Chen Yi-an; Chinese Taipei
Bantamweight (−51 kg)	Park Sun-young; South Korea	Carmela Hartnett; Australia	Chai Saew Yuen; Malaysia
Featherweight (−55 kg)	Kim So-young; South Korea	Tung Ya-ling; Chinese Taipei	Cheung Ma Ling; Hong Kong
Featherweight (−55 kg)	Kim So-young; South Korea	Tung Ya-ling; Chinese Taipei	Penny Glowacki; Australia
Lightweight (−60 kg)	Lee Eun-young; South Korea	Chen Jiun-feng; Chinese Taipei	Angela Coulson; Australia
Lightweight (−60 kg)	Lee Eun-young; South Korea	Chen Jiun-feng; Chinese Taipei	Rita Shrestha; Nepal
Welterweight (−65 kg)	Kim Ji-sook; South Korea	Joyce Ong; Malaysia	Mira Thapa; Nepal
Welterweight (−65 kg)	Kim Ji-sook; South Korea	Joyce Ong; Malaysia	Tang Hui-ting; Chinese Taipei
Middleweight (−70 kg)	Kim Hyun-hee; South Korea	Wang Chin-yu; Chinese Taipei	Laxmi Gurung; Nepal
Middleweight (−70 kg)	Kim Hyun-hee; South Korea	Wang Chin-yu; Chinese Taipei	Lau Choo Boon; Malaysia
Heavyweight (+70 kg)	Jang Yoon-jung; South Korea	Lee Show-lan; Chinese Taipei	Manju Tuladhar; Nepal
Heavyweight (+70 kg)	Jang Yoon-jung; South Korea	Lee Show-lan; Chinese Taipei	None awarded

== Medal table ==
Rank	Nation	Gold	Silver	Bronze	Total
1	South Korea	15	0	0	15
2	Chinese Taipei	1	9	5	15
3	Australia	0	1	6	7
3	Nepal	0	1	6	7
5	Jordan	0	1	3	4
6	Hong Kong	0	1	2	3
6	Malaysia	0	1	2	3
8	Iraq	0	1	0	1
8	Singapore	0	1	0	1
10	Philippines	0	0	3	3
11	Qatar	0	0	2	2
12	Iran	0	0	1	1
12	Japan	0	0	1	1
Totals (13 entries)		16	16	31	63
