= USA Taekwondo =

American Taekwondo national governing body

- Formation: 1978
- Type: Sports association
- Legal status: Federation
- Headquarters: Colorado Springs, Colorado, U.S.
- Location: United States
- Region served: United States
- Website: www.usatkd.org

USA Taekwondo (USATKD) is the national governing body (NGB) of Taekwondo for the United States Olympic Committee (USOC) and thus the United States' official Member National Association of World Taekwondo USAT has complete authority over all decisions regarding US national junior and senior team selections for World Taekwondo events, including the Summer Olympic Games Taekwondo competition event.

== History ==
The group formed in the 1970s as the AAU National Taekwondo Association, but later broke away from the AAU and created the United States Taekwondo Union (USTU). In 2005, its name changed again to USA Taekwondo after the USOC (now known as the USOPC) took over the governance of the USTU in 2004. In 2006, the first USAT board of directors was elected by the membership.

The headquarters of USAT is located in Colorado Springs, Colorado.

== Leadership ==
- Dr. Ken Min (Chairman-National AAU Taekwondo Committee 1974-1978)
- Dr. Dong Ja Yang (Chairman-AAU National Taekwondo Union 1979-1984)
- Grand Master Moo Young Lee (US Taekwondo Union 1985-1986)
- Grand Master Kyongwon Ahn (US Taekwondo Union 1986-1988, 1989–1992)
- Grand Master Hwa Chong (US Taekwondo Union 1993-1996)
- Grand Master Sang Lee (US Taekwondo Union 1997-2000)
- Harvey Berkey (Chair USA Taekwondo 2006)
- Ronda Sweet (Chair USA Taekwondo 2007-2009)
- Kevin Padilla (Chair USA Taekwondo 2010–?)
- David Askinas (CEO USA Taekwondo 2006-2011).
- Eric Parthen (CEO USA Taekwondo 2011-2012)
- Bruce Harris (CEO USA Taekwondo 2013–2016)
- Keith Ferguson (CEO USA Taekwondo 2016-2017)
- Steve MacNally (CEO USA Taekwondo 2017–present)

== USA Taekwondo in the Olympic Games ==
During its history many athletes representing the USAT at the Olympics have been successful at obtaining medals.

=== 1988 – Seoul, South Korea (demonstration sport) ===
U.S. MEDALISTS

- Dana Hee - Gold
- Arlene Limas - Gold
- Lynnette Love - Gold
- Jimmy Kim - Gold
- Debra Holloway - Silver
- Juan Moreno - Silver
- Mayumi Pejo - Bronze
- Sharon Jewell - Bronze
- Han Won Lee - Bronze
- Greg Baker - Bronze
- Jay Warwick - Bronze

=== 1992 – Barcelona, Spain (demonstration sport) ===
U.S. MEDALISTS

- Herbert Perez - Gold
- Juan Moreno - Silver
- Diane Murray - Silver
- Danielle Laney - Bronze
- Lynnette Love - Bronze
- Terry Poindexter - Bronze

=== 2000 – Sydney, Australia ===
U.S. MEDALISTS

- Steven López - Gold

=== 2004 – Athens, Greece ===
U.S. MEDALISTS

- Steven López - Gold
- Nia Abdallah - Silver

=== 2008 - Beijing, China ===
U.S. MEDALISTS

- Mark López - Silver
- Diana López - Bronze
- Steven López - Bronze

=== 2012 - London, England ===
U.S. MEDALISTS

- Paige McPherson - Bronze
- Terrence Jennings - Bronze

=== 2016 - Rio de Janeiro, Brazil ===
U.S. MEDALISTS

- Jackie Galloway - Bronze

=== 2020 - Tokyo, Japan ===
U.S. MEDALISTS

- Anastasija Zolotic - Gold

=== 2024 - Paris, France ===
U.S. MEDALISTS

- Kristina Teachout - Bronze
