= Iran at the 1988 Summer Olympics =

- IOC code: IRI (IRN used at these Games)
- NOC: National Olympic Committee of the Islamic Republic of Iran

in Seoul, South Korea
- Competitors: 27 in 4 sports
- Flag bearer: Hassan Zahedi
- Medals Ranked 36th: Gold 0 Silver 1 Bronze 0 Total 1

Summer Olympics appearances (overview)
- 1900; 1904–1936; 1948; 1952; 1956; 1960; 1964; 1968; 1972; 1976; 1980–1984; 1988; 1992; 1996; 2000; 2004; 2008; 2012; 2016; 2020; 2024; 2028

Athletes from the Islamic Republic of Iran competed at the 1988 Summer Olympics in Seoul, South Korea. The nation returned to the Olympic Games after missing both the 1980 and 1984 Summer Olympics, due to the Iranian Revolution of 1979 and the Iran–Iraq War, which lasted from 1980 until 1988.

== Competitors ==
Sport	Men	Women	Total
Athletics	1		1
Cycling, Road	6		6
Cycling, Track	2		2
Taekwondo	4		4
Wrestling	15		15
Total	27	0	27

== Medal summary ==
=== Medal table ===
Sport	Gold	Silver	Bronze	Total
Taekwondo			1	1
Wrestling		1		1
Total	0	1	0	1

Note: Demonstration sports indicated in italics.

=== Medalists ===
Medal	Name	Sport	Event
Silver	Askari Mohammadian	Wrestling	Men's freestyle 57 kg

== Results by event ==
=== Athletics ===
Men

Athlete	Event	Time	Rank
Nasser Babapour	Marathon	3:00:20	93

=== Cycling ===
==== Road ====
Men

Athlete	Event	Time	Rank
Iraj Amirakhori	Road race	4:32:56	56
Mohammad Reza Bajoul	Road race	Did not finish	
Siamak Safarzadeh	Road race	4:42:47	93
Mostafa Chaichi; Abbas Esmaeili; Mehrdad Safarzadeh; Siamak Safarzadeh	Team time trial	2:15:29.5	23

==== Track ====
Men

Athlete	Event	Qualification		1/8 final	Quarterfinal	Semifinal	Final	Rank
Athlete	Event	Time	Rank	1/8 final	Quarterfinal	Semifinal	Final	Rank
Jalil Eftekhari	1 km time trial						1:11.683	27
Mostafa Chaichi	Individual pursuit	Overlapped		Did not advance				—

Athlete	Event	Qualification			Final		Rank
Athlete	Event	Heat	Score	Rank	Score	Rank	Rank
Jalil Eftekhari	Points race	2	13 (–2 laps)	14	Did not advance		29

=== Wrestling ===
Men's freestyle

Athlete	Event	Eliminatory round						Final	Rank
Athlete	Event	Round 1	Round 2	Round 3	Round 4	Round 5	Round 6 / 7	Final	Rank
Nasser Zeinalnia	48 kg	Delgado (COL); W 17–0	Şükrüoğlu (TUR); W 4–3	Kobayashi (JPN); L Fall	Vanni (USA); L Fall	Did not advance		7th place match Anger (GDR); L Walkover	8
Majid Torkan	52 kg	Lo (TPE); W 15–0	Woodcraft (CAN); W Fall	Toguzov (URS); L 2–4	Trstena (YUG); L DNF	Did not advance			13
Askari Mohammadian	57 kg	Battuul (MGL); W Fall	Kimani (KEN); W 15–0	Chen (CHN); W Fall	Noh (KOR); W 16–1	Ivanov (BUL); W 5–4	Bye	Beloglazov (URS); L 1–5	2nd place, silver medalist(s)
Akbar Fallah	62 kg	Farrugia (MLT); W 15–0	Kim (KOR); W 4–3	Bye	Bohay (CAN); W 6–1	Polky (GDR); W 10–3	Helmdach (FRG); W 5–0	3rd place match Shterev (BUL); L 2–5	4
Akbar Fallah	62 kg	Farrugia (MLT); W 15–0	Kim (KOR); W 4–3	Bye	Bohay (CAN); W 6–1	Polky (GDR); W 10–3	Sarkisyan (URS); L 1–12	3rd place match Shterev (BUL); L 2–5	4
Amir Reza Khadem	68 kg	Bye	El-Khodary (EGY); W 16–0	Rauhala (FIN); L 7–8	Wattar (SYR); W 17–1	Fadzaev (URS); L 4–12	Did not advance		11
Ayat Vagozari	74 kg	Varaev (URS); L 3–5	Anwar (PAK); W 20–9	Kumar (IND); W Fall	Westendorf (GDR); W 6–3	Hara (JPN); W 12–9	Sofiadi (BUL); L DNF	5th place match Rauhala (FIN); L DNF	6
Ahmad Afghan	82 kg	Nto (CMR); W Fall	Iglesias (ESP); W 15–0	Rinke (CAN); L 6–7	Sükhbat (MGL); L 0–15	Did not advance			11
Mohammad Reza Toupchi	90 kg	Lukowski (FRG); W 3–2	Alabakov (BUL); L 2–3	Kim (KOR); L DSQP	Did not advance				17

Men's Greco-Roman

Athlete	Event	Eliminatory round						Final	Rank
Athlete	Event	Round 1	Round 2	Round 3	Round 4	Round 5	Round 6 / 7	Final	Rank
Reza Simkhah	48 kg	Scherer (FRG); L 5–10	Yang (CHN); L 0–16	Did not advance				Did not advance	13
Abdolkarim Kakahaji	52 kg	Murtoaro (FIN); L 8–10	Miyahara (JPN); L 1–6	Did not advance					14
Ahad Pazaj	57 kg	Sigde (NOR); L Fall	Chestakov (URS); L 0–15	Did not advance					20
Ahad Javansalehi	62 kg	Madzhidov (URS); L 3–8	Lakhal (TUN); W 5–0	An (KOR); L Disqualification	Did not advance			Did not advance	10
Masoud Ghadimi	68 kg	Zhao (CHN); W 2–1	Abrial (FRA); L Fall	Kim (KOR); L Disqualification	Did not advance				21
Reza Andouz	74 kg	Turlykhanov (URS); L Fall	Balcı (TUR); L DSQP	Did not advance					16
Mehdi Moradi Ganjeh	82 kg	Stoykov (BUL); L 0–14	Fredriksson (SWE); L DSQP	Did not advance					16

== Demonstration sports ==
=== Taekwondo ===
Men

Athlete	Event	1/8 final	Quarterfinal	Semifinal	Final	Rank
Fariborz Danesh	50 kg	Rumeon (NED); W Points	Torroella (MEX); L Points	Did not advance		5
Feisal Danesh	58 kg	Carvallo (ECU); W Points	Salim (DEN); W Points	Sanabria (ESP); L Points	Did not advance	3rd place, bronze medalist(s)
Hassan Zahedi	83 kg	Fraser (GBR); L Walkover	Did not advance			—
Mansour Bagheri	+83 kg	Da Rocha (GHA); W Points	Kim (USA); L Points	Did not advance		5
