= TSV 1865 Dachau =

German sports club

Turn- und Sportverein Dachau 1865 e.V., commonly known as TSV 1865 Dachau, is a German sports club based in Dachau, Bavaria. TSV 1865 Dachau is best known for the success of the taekwondo department within the club. However, TSV 1865 Dachau does have the departments for the other sports such as: Association football, basketball, baseball, archery, table tennis, gymnastics, aikidō, fencing, handball, judo, tennis, and rock and roll dancing.

== History ==
TSV 1865 Dachau was founded in Dachau in 1865. However, the TSV 1865 Dachau did not have their own sports field for almost 55 years before the Ludwig-Böswirth-Platz was erected on the Augustenfeld in Dachau in 1921. World War II led the discontinuation of the club and it was not revived again till 1950. The club finally added their own sports hall as it was built on the club's sports field between 1956 and 1959. In 2006, the club merged with the insolvent SSV Dachau-Ost, taking over 430 members, departments, and the properties to become the sole sports club in Dachau and the effect of it is that it led TSV 1865 Dachau to sell its former places, including the sports field and the sports hall, to move into the SSV Dachau-Ost's properties.

== Sports ==
=== Taekwondo ===
The taekwondo department was originally a department of sports club SSV Dachau-Ost in the 1970s. Since 1976, the members of the taekwondo department have won several regional, Germany national, and international championships. The current trainer of the department is Reinhard Langer, who achieved fourth place in the Summer Olympics, as well as a former a 5-time Germany champion and 3-time European champion. The Germany national team has their Olympic Training Center in Dachau, due to the success of TSV 1865 Dachau's taekwondo team.

=== Association football ===
TSV 1865 Dachau
- TSV 1865 Dachau football department logo
- Full name: Turn- und Sportverein Dachau 1865 e.V.
- Founded: 1912
- Ground: Jahnstraße
- Capacity: 3,000
- Department head: Marcel Richter
- Team manager: Fabian Lamotte
- League: Bayernliga Süd (V)
- 2021–22: Bayernliga Süd, 17th of 19
Home colours

The football department of TSV was founded in 1912 as the first independent department of the club. Before joining the South German Football Association, the TSV 1865 Dachau only played the friendlies in the first year. After joining the Association, the first official game was played in 1917. Also in 1917 during the first season, TSV 1865 Dachau won the Bezirks München over TSV 1860 München and FC Bayern Munich. Next season in 1918, the club finished third behind those associations. After the conclusion of World War I, the club started to play in A-Klasse. After played in A-Klasse, TSV 1865 Dachau was promoted to the highest Bayern football league, Kreisliga Bayern in 1922. Being placed in the Kreisliga Südbayern, TSV 1865 Dachau finished the 1922 season in 8th place and got relegated from the Kreisliga Bayern. After the relegation, the club was unable to achieve any more significant success ever since.

In the last decade, the men's first team played in the Bezirksliga Oberbayern-Nord, the 8th tier of the German football league system. At the end of 2010–11 season, TSV 1865 Dachau and TSV Manching were finished tied for the first place on same points, so they had to play a decider to determine who will win the Bezirksliga Oberbayern-Nord and get promoted to Bezirksoberliga Oberbayern above. In the decider, TSV 1865 Dachau lost to TSV Manching in a penalty shoot-out and finished second behind TSV Manching in 2010–11 Bezirksliga Oberbayern-Nord. However, as the runners-up, TSV 1865 Dachau qualified for the Promotion-Relegation round vs SC Kirchheim but TSV 1865 Dachau lost to SC Kirchheim, which means for the second year in a row that TSV 1865 Dachau failed to win the Promotion-Relegation round after a similar loss to SV Raistling in 2010. In the following year, TSV 1865 Dachau finally won the Bezirksliga Oberbayern-Nord championship in a win over FC Gerolfing to celebrate the promotion into a newly created sixth tier Landesliga Bayern (as a result of it, Bezirksliga Oberbayern-Nord was promoted to the 7th tier). At the end of the 2012–13 season, TSV 1865 Dachau was moved to the other division within the Landesliga Bayern: Fußball-Landesliga Bayern-Südost for the 2013–14 season. Winning this league the club earned promotion to the Bayernliga for the first time.

=== Basketball ===
The basketball department is known as the Dachau Spurs and currently plays in the 1. Basketball-Regionalliga Südost. Christian Stüber holds the club record for the most appearance in the official matches with 226 appearances for Dachau Spurs. Dachau Spurs plays their home games in the Jahnhalle which is part of the Jahnstraße in Dachau. The TSV's basketball department also plays in the numerous youth leagues such as: U10 Kreisliga, U12 Kreisliga, U13 Kreisliga, U14 Bezirksoberliga, U16 Bezirksliga, U17 Kreisliga, U18 Bezirksoberliga.

== Famous Athletes of the Club ==
Event	Place	Gender	Sport	Athlete
1980 European Taekwondo Championships	Gold	Man	Taekwondo	Michael Arndt
1980 European Taekwondo Championships	Gold	Men	Taekwondo	Reinhard Langer
1982 European Taekwondo Championships	Gold	Men	Taekwondo	Reinhard Langer
1982 European Taekwondo Championships	Silver	Men	Taekwondo	Athanassios Karamangiolis
1984 European Taekwondo Championships	Gold	Men	Taekwondo	Reinhard Langer
1986 European Taekwondo Championships	Gold	Men	Taekwondo	Michael Arndt
1987 World Taekwondo Championships	Gold	Men	Taekwondo	Michael Arndt
1988 Summer Olympics (Demonstration Sport)	Bronze	Men	Taekwondo	Michael Arndt
2000 Summer Olympics	Silver	Men	Taekwondo	Faissal Ebnoutalib
2003 World Taekwondo Championships	Silver	Men	Taekwondo	Faissal Ebnoutalib
2004 European Taekwondo Championships	Bronze	Men	Taekwondo	Faissal Ebnoutalib
2005 European Taekwondo Championships	Silver	Men	Taekwondo	Faissal Ebnoutalib
