= 1986 Asian Taekwondo Championships =

- Venue: Marrara Indoor Stadium
- Location: Darwin, Australia
- Dates: 18–20 April 1986

Champions
- Men: South Korea
- Women: Chinese Taipei

The 1986 Asian Taekwondo Championships were the 7th edition of the Asian Taekwondo Championships, and were held in Darwin, Australia from 9 to 11 November, 1984.

== Medal summary ==
=== Men ===
Event	Gold	Silver	Bronze
Finweight (−50 kg)	Chang Jung-san; Chinese Taipei	Kim Young-joo; South Korea	Paul Lyons; Australia
Finweight (−50 kg)	Chang Jung-san; Chinese Taipei	Kim Young-joo; South Korea	Yefi Triaji; Indonesia
Flyweight (−54 kg)	Lee Hae-jin; South Korea	Akbar Bakrani; Iran	Selvamuthu Ramasamy; Malaysia
Flyweight (−54 kg)	Lee Hae-jin; South Korea	Akbar Bakrani; Iran	Kikuta Yoshimitsu; Japan
Bantamweight (−58 kg)	Ji Yong-suk; South Korea	Tareq Lababidi; Jordan	Mohan Kumar Rai; Nepal
Bantamweight (−58 kg)	Ji Yong-suk; South Korea	Tareq Lababidi; Jordan	Tony Gibb; Australia
Featherweight (−64 kg)	Jung Seung-hwan; South Korea	Po-Nhu Ly; Australia	Samer Kamal; Jordan
Featherweight (−64 kg)	Jung Seung-hwan; South Korea	Po-Nhu Ly; Australia	Mohammad Ali Ghaderi; Iran
Lightweight (−70 kg)	Lee Chang-kun; South Korea	Jo Jin-ho; Australia	Ali Hajipour; Iran
Lightweight (−70 kg)	Lee Chang-kun; South Korea	Jo Jin-ho; Australia	Agus Pakpahan; Indonesia
Welterweight (−76 kg)	Yoon Soon-cheol; South Korea	Zoran Dimoski; Australia	Lee Hyong-ho; Guam
Welterweight (−76 kg)	Yoon Soon-cheol; South Korea	Zoran Dimoski; Australia	Hassan Zahedi; Iran
Middleweight (−83 kg)	Jim Fassolis; Australia	Waleed Al-Hashash; Bahrain	Chang Jil-hwan; South Korea
Middleweight (−83 kg)	Jim Fassolis; Australia	Waleed Al-Hashash; Bahrain	Lee Yoke Keong; Malaysia
Heavyweight (+83 kg)	Lee Jung-jin; South Korea	Toh Soon Kok; Singapore	Joseph Hungan; Indonesia
Heavyweight (+83 kg)	Lee Jung-jin; South Korea	Toh Soon Kok; Singapore	Rashid Hassan Bado; Bahrain

=== Women ===
Event	Gold	Silver	Bronze
Finweight (−43 kg)	Chin Yu-fang; Chinese Taipei	Shin Sook; South Korea	Dawn Knoop; Australia
Finweight (−43 kg)	Chin Yu-fang; Chinese Taipei	Shin Sook; South Korea	Desy Astuty; Indonesia
Flyweight (−47 kg)	Oh Myong-hwa; South Korea	Wong Liang Ming; Singapore	Bronwyn Butterworth; Australia
Flyweight (−47 kg)	Oh Myong-hwa; South Korea	Wong Liang Ming; Singapore	Lee Chia-jung; Chinese Taipei
Bantamweight (−51 kg)	Julie Chadwick; Australia	Hsu Jui-hsueh; Chinese Taipei	Park Sun-young; South Korea
Bantamweight (−51 kg)	Julie Chadwick; Australia	Hsu Jui-hsueh; Chinese Taipei	A. Feusa; Indonesia
Featherweight (−55 kg)	Chen Jiun-feng; Chinese Taipei	Hani Dian; Indonesia	Carmela Hartnett; Australia
Featherweight (−55 kg)	Chen Jiun-feng; Chinese Taipei	Hani Dian; Indonesia	W. O'Neill; New Zealand
Lightweight (−60 kg)	Tang Hui-ting; Chinese Taipei	Jodie Simmonds; Australia	Kim Ji-sook; South Korea
Lightweight (−60 kg)	Tang Hui-ting; Chinese Taipei	Jodie Simmonds; Australia	P. Wilson; New Zealand
Welterweight (−65 kg)	Chun Oh-soon; South Korea	Tu Kuei-hua; Chinese Taipei	Pingkan Adewani; Indonesia
Welterweight (−65 kg)	Chun Oh-soon; South Korea	Tu Kuei-hua; Chinese Taipei	Joyce Ong; Malaysia
Middleweight (−70 kg)	Denise Parmley; Australia	Kim Hyun-hee; South Korea	Foo Yong Lai; Singapore
Middleweight (−70 kg)	Denise Parmley; Australia	Kim Hyun-hee; South Korea	Wang Chin-yu; Chinese Taipei
Heavyweight (+70 kg)	Jang Yoon-jung; South Korea	Liu Yi-ling; Chinese Taipei	U. Udules; New Zealand
Heavyweight (+70 kg)	Jang Yoon-jung; South Korea	Liu Yi-ling; Chinese Taipei	None awarded

== Medal table ==
Rank	Nation	Gold	Silver	Bronze	Total
1	South Korea	9	3	3	15
2	Chinese Taipei	4	3	2	9
3	Australia	3	4	5	12
4	Singapore	0	2	1	3
5	Indonesia	0	1	6	7
6	Iran	0	1	3	4
7	Bahrain	0	1	1	2
7	Jordan	0	1	1	2
9	Malaysia	0	0	3	3
9	New Zealand	0	0	3	3
11	Guam	0	0	1	1
11	Japan	0	0	1	1
11	Nepal	0	0	1	1
Totals (13 entries)		16	16	31	63
