= 1988 European Taekwondo Championships =

Taekwondo competition

- Location: Ankara, Turkey
- Start date: 26 May
- End date: 29 May

The 1988 European Taekwondo Championships were held in Ankara, Turkey. The event took place from 26 to 29 May, 1988.

== Medal summary ==
* Host nation (Turkey)

Rank	Nation	Gold	Silver	Bronze	Total
1	Turkey	6	5	2	13
2	Spain	4	3	6	13
3	Netherlands	2	3	2	7
4	Italy	2	1	3	6
5	West Germany	1	3	5	9
6	Denmark	1	0	5	6
7	Switzerland	0	1	0	1
8	Austria	0	0	3	3
9	Finland	0	0	2	2
10	France	0	0	1	1
10	Sweden	0	0	1	1
10	Yugoslavia	0	0	1	1
Totals (12 entries)		16	16	31	63

=== Men ===
Event	Gold	Silver	Bronze
–50 kg	Harun Ateş; Turkey	Vicky Rumeon; Netherlands	Óscar Blanco; Spain; Dario Manca; Italy
–54 kg	Geremia Di Constanzo; Italy	Reinhard Langer; West Germany	Thomas Mayr; Austria; Josef Salim; Denmark
–58 kg	José Sanabria; Spain	Nuno Damaso; Switzerland	Şakir Bezcir; Turkey; Christian Herberth; West Germany
–64 kg	Jesús Tortosa Alameda; Spain	Cengiz Yağız; Turkey	Thomas Filio; Denmark; Hubert Sinègre; France
–70 kg	Nusret Ramazanoğlu; Turkey	José Eles; Spain	Markku Parviainen; Finland; Ruben Thijs; Netherlands
–76 kg	Osman Şener Özsoy; Turkey	John Wright Díaz; Spain	Marcello Pezzolla; Italy; Robert Tomašević; Yugoslavia
–83 kg	Markus Woznicki; West Germany	Metin Şahin; Turkey	Miguel Jordán; Spain; Jari Kaila; Finland
+83 kg	Tonny Sørensen; Denmark	Ali Şahin; Turkey	José Luis Álvarez; Spain; Henk Meijer; Netherlands

=== Women ===
Event	Gold	Silver	Bronze
–43 kg	María Rosa Moreno; Spain	Emine Güler; Turkey	Sonja Galvano; Italy; Charlotte König; West Germany
–47 kg	Piera Muggiri; Italy	Anita van der Pas; Netherlands	Bettina Engelking; West Germany; Regina Singer; Austria
–51 kg	Sultan Demir; Turkey	Roberta Parisella; Italy	Fatma-Ayse Kayadelen; West Germany; Josefina López; Spain
–55 kg	Züleyha Tan; Turkey	Kerstin Aaslepp; West Germany	Amparo Dols; Spain; Anne-Mette Christensen; Denmark
–60 kg	Sibel Dinçer; Turkey	Jolanda van Duren; Netherlands	Karin Schwartz; Denmark; Juana Usurbil; Spain
–65 kg	Coral Bistuer; Spain	Sonny Seidel; West Germany	Petra Adler; Sweden; Sabina Luciani; Denmark
–70 kg	Mandy de Jongh; Netherlands	Elena Navaz; Spain	Michaela Huber; Austria; Şeyda Şerifoğlu; Turkey
+70 kg	Anne-Mieke Buijs; Netherlands	Mine Arduç; Turkey	Ute Güster; West Germany
