= Bidhan Lama =

Nepalese taekwondo practitioner

Personal information
- Native name: विधान लामा
- Nationality: Nepalese
- Born: 22 March 1966 (age 60) Lainchour, Kathmandu, Nepal
- Height: 160.02 cm (5 ft 3 in)
- Weight: 50 kg (110 lb)
- Children: 3 daughters and a son

Sport
- Sport: Taekwondo
- Rank: Shichidan Black belt in Taekwondo
- Event: 50kg finweight
- Coached by: Kailash Rai
- Retired: 1990
Medal record
Representing Nepal
Event	1st	2nd	3rd
Olympic Games	-	–	1
World Championships	-	–	1
Asian Championships	-	1	–
Asian Games	-	-	1
Total	0	1	3
Olympic Games
Bronze medal – third place	1988 Seoul	-50 kg
World Championships
Bronze medal – third place	1987 Barcelona	-50 kg
Asian Championships
Silver medal – second place	1988 Kathmandu	-50 kg
Asian Games
Bronze medal – third place	1986 Seoul	-50 kg

Bidhan Lama (Nepali: विधान लामा; born 22 March 1966) is a Nepalese taekwondo practitioner who competed in the men's −50 kg division.

Lama won a bronze medal at the 1986 Asian Games in the men's 50kg finweight event, becoming the first Nepali athlete to win a medal at the Asian Games. He also won bronze medals at the 1987 World Taekwondo Championships and in the taekwondo demonstration event at the 1988 Summer Olympics.

His bronze medal at the 1987 World Taekwondo Championships made him the first Nepali athlete to win a medal at a world championship in an Olympic sport. As of 2026, he remains the only Nepali athlete to have won a medal at the Summer Olympics.

Lama represented the Nepal Taekwondo Association throughout his competitive career. At the 1988 Summer Olympics, he defeated Ebenezer Ghansah of Great Britain in the opening round and Choi Chan-ok of West Germany in the quarter-finals before losing to Juan Moreno of the United States in the semi-finals, earning a bronze medal in the demonstration event.

He also won a silver medal at the 1988 Asian Taekwondo Championships, the first silver medal won by Nepal at the championships.

== Post-competitive career ==
After his competitive career, Lama moved to the United States in the early 1990s. He has stated in interviews that the move was for educational and professional opportunities and to support his family.

In 1995, Lama established a taekwondo training center in the United States. He subsequently worked as a taekwondo instructor and has continued to promote taekwondo among the Nepalese diaspora while supporting the development of the sport in Nepal.

== Awards and honours ==
=== National honours ===
==== Nepal ====
- 1986 – Order of Gorkha Dakshina Bahu, Member Fifth Class
- 1987 – Order of Gorkha Dakshina Bahu, Member Fourth Class

== Legacy ==
Lama is regarded as one of the pioneers of taekwondo in Nepal. His bronze medal at the 1986 Asian Games was Nepal's first medal at the Asian Games, while his bronze medal at the 1987 World Taekwondo Championships was the country's first medal at a world championship in an Olympic sport. His achievements contributed to the growth of taekwondo in Nepal and earned him national honours, including the Fourth and Fifth Class of the Order of Gorkha Dakshina Bahu.
