= 1986 European Taekwondo Championships =

Taekwondo competition

- Location: Seefeld, Austria
- Start date: 3 October
- End date: 5 October

The 1986 European Taekwondo Championships were held in Seefeld, Austria. The event took place from 3 to 5 October, 1986.

== Medal summary ==
* Host nation (Austria)

| Rank | Nation | Gold | Silver | Bronze | Total |
|---|---|---|---|---|---|
| 1 | Netherlands | 4 | 0 | 3 | 7 |
| 2 | West Germany | 3 | 6 | 2 | 11 |
| 3 | Turkey | 3 | 5 | 3 | 11 |
| 4 | Denmark | 2 | 1 | 3 | 6 |
| 5 | France | 2 | 0 | 0 | 2 |
| 6 | Spain | 1 | 2 | 5 | 8 |
| 7 | Austria* | 1 | 1 | 5 | 7 |
| 8 | Italy | 0 | 1 | 8 | 9 |
| 9 | Finland | 0 | 0 | 2 | 2 |
| 10 | Great Britain | 0 | 0 | 1 | 1 |
| Totals (10 entries) | | 16 | 16 | 32 | 64 |

=== Men ===
| Event | Gold | Silver | Bronze |
|---|---|---|---|
| 50 kg | Chan-Ok Choi; West Germany | Harun Ateş; Turkey | Jan Hansen; Denmark |
| 50 kg | Chan-Ok Choi; West Germany | Harun Ateş; Turkey | Dario Manca; Italy |
| 54 kg | Josef Salim; Denmark | Turgut Uçan; Turkey | Geremia Di Constanzo; Italy |
| 54 kg | Josef Salim; Denmark | Turgut Uçan; Turkey | José Guerra; Spain |
| 58 kg | Ole Nielsen; Denmark | Şakir Bezci; Turkey | Erwin Goewie; Netherlands |
| 58 kg | Ole Nielsen; Denmark | Şakir Bezci; Turkey | Eduardo Rodríguez; Spain |
| 64 kg | Franck Cribaillet; France | Andreas Hoflehner; Austria | Lucio Cuozzo; Italy |
| 64 kg | Franck Cribaillet; France | Andreas Hoflehner; Austria | Cengiz Yağız; Turkey |
| 70 kg | Ruben Thijs; Netherlands | Ahmet Ercan; Turkey | Pietro Carrieri; Italy |
| 70 kg | Ruben Thijs; Netherlands | Ahmet Ercan; Turkey | Georg Streif; West Germany |
| 76 kg | Helmut Köck; Austria | Robert Beckenbauer; West Germany | Chris Sawyer; Great Britain |
| 76 kg | Helmut Köck; Austria | Robert Beckenbauer; West Germany | Luigi D'Oriano; Italy |
| 83 kg | Metin Şahin; Turkey | Martin Bernhofer; West Germany | Francesco Gentile; Italy |
| 83 kg | Metin Şahin; Turkey | Martin Bernhofer; West Germany | Erich Zaller; Austria |
| +83 kg | Michael Arndt; West Germany | Tonny Sørensen; Denmark | Kimmo Tirkkonen; Finland |
| +83 kg | Michael Arndt; West Germany | Tonny Sørensen; Denmark | Ali Şahin; Turkey |

=== Women ===
| Event | Gold | Silver | Bronze |
|---|---|---|---|
| 43 kg | Necla Demirel; Turkey | María Rosa Moreno; Spain | Gerlinde Aidelsburger; West Germany |
| 43 kg | Necla Demirel; Turkey | María Rosa Moreno; Spain | Sonja Galvano; Italy |
| 47 kg | Anita van der Pas; Netherlands | Bettina Engelking; West Germany | Regina Singer; Austria |
| 47 kg | Anita van der Pas; Netherlands | Bettina Engelking; West Germany | Aytül Uçan; Turkey |
| 51 kg | Marion Gal; West Germany | Roberta Parisella; Italy | Veronika Six; Austria |
| 51 kg | Marion Gal; West Germany | Roberta Parisella; Italy | Rafaela Velasco; Spain |
| 55 kg | Züleyhan Tan; Turkey | Rocío Valverde; Spain | Anna Ciampalia; Italy |
| 55 kg | Züleyhan Tan; Turkey | Rocío Valverde; Spain | Anne-Mette Christensen; Denmark |
| 60 kg | Brigitte Evanno; France | Maria Hörmann; West Germany | Elena Benítez; Spain |
| 60 kg | Brigitte Evanno; France | Maria Hörmann; West Germany | Yolanda Klaver; Netherlands |
| 65 kg | Coral Bistuer; Spain | Sema Kaya; Turkey | Bente Mathiesen; Denmark |
| 65 kg | Coral Bistuer; Spain | Sema Kaya; Turkey | Anita Reniers; Netherlands |
| 70 kg | Mandy de Jongh; Netherlands | Angelika Biegger; West Germany | Michaela Huber; Austria |
| 70 kg | Mandy de Jongh; Netherlands | Angelika Biegger; West Germany | Fátima Mir; Spain |
| +70 kg | Anne-Mieke Buijs; Netherlands | Ute Güster; West Germany | Mia Keränen; Finland |
| +70 kg | Anne-Mieke Buijs; Netherlands | Ute Güster; West Germany | Christine Six; Austria |
