= Şakir Bezcir =

Turkish taekwondo practitioner

Sport
- Country: Turkey
- Sport: Taekwondo
Medal record
Men's taekwondo
World Championships
Silver medal – second place	1987 Barcelona	–58 kg
European Championships
Silver medal – second place	1986 Seefeld	–58 kg
Bronze medal – third place	1988 Ankara	–58 kg

Şakir Bezcir is a Turkish taekwondo practitioner. He competed at the 1987 World Taekwondo Championships, winning the silver medal in the -58 kg event. He also competed at the 1988 European Taekwondo Championships, winning the bronze medal in the same event.
