= 1982 European Taekwondo Championships =

Taekwondo competition

- Location: Rome, Italy
- Start date: 14 September
- End date: 17 September

The 1982 European Taekwondo Championships were held in Rome Italy between September 23 and 27, 1982 under the organization of the European Taekwondo Union (ETU) and Italian Taekwondo Federation.

== Medal table ==
* Host nation (Italy)

Rank	Nation	Gold	Silver	Bronze	Total
1	West Germany	5	4	6	15
2	Spain	4	2	3	9
3	Netherlands	3	3	4	10
4	Italy*	2	4	3	9
5	Turkey	2	0	2	4
6	France	1	1	3	5
7	Denmark	1	1	2	4
8	Great Britain	0	2	4	6
9	Greece	0	1	1	2
10	Austria	0	0	3	3
11	Belgium	0	0	2	2
12	Norway	0	0	1	1
Totals (12 entries)		18	18	34	70

== Medal summary ==
=== Men ===
Event	Gold	Silver	Bronze
48 kg	(Spain) Emilio Azofra	(Germany) Chan-Ok Choi	(United Kingdom) Simon Bailey (Denmark) Henrik Knudensen
52 kg	(Germany) Reinhard Langer	(Spain) Santiago Munoz	(Turkey) Celal Ada (Netherlands) Ben Rumeon
56 kg	(Italy) Geremia Di Constanzo	(Denmark) Claus Petersen	(Italy) Josef Ascanio (Netherlands) Herman Hartevelt
60 kg	(Germany) Thomas Fabula	(Italy) Raffaele Marchione	(Turkey) Ünal Bulut (Spain) Francisco Mera
68 kg	(Netherlands) Rubens Thijs	(France) Philipe Bouede	(Germany) Egbert Flugel (Italy) Vincenzo Mannaioli
78 kg	(Germany) Richard Schulz	(Greece) Athanasios Karamangiolis	(France) Angel Bonadei (Italy) Leonardi Giampiero
84 kg	(Spain) Ireno Fargas	(Germany) Eckhardt Pisch	(United Kingdom) John Armson (Netherlands) Arno Spitters
84+ kg	(Netherlands) Henk Meijer	(Denmark) Torben Madsen	(Germany) Harald Kuchler (France) Jean Maker

=== Women ===
Event	Gold	Silver	Bronze
40 kg	(Spain) María José Díaz	(Italy) Luisa Domingo	None awarded
44 kg	(Turkey) Tennur Yerlisu	(Italy) Cinzia Pacenza	(Spain) Charo Muñoz (United Kingdom) Deborah Sherrington
48 kg	(West Germany) Ilona Ersinger	(Italy) Antonietta la Pietra	(Norway) Trine Bryhn (Austria) Regina Singer
52 kg	(Turkey) Nurten Yalçınkaya	(United Kingdom) Susan Greaves	(West Germany) Marion Gal (France) Huyuh Thuy
57 kg	(France) Brigitte Evanno	(Spain) Beatriz Álvarez	(West Germany) Dorothea Kapkowski (United Kingdom) Diane Robinson
62 kg	(Spain) Coral Bistuer	(Netherlands) Wina Hubers van Assenraad	(West Germany) Doris Fuchsreiter (Austria) Karin Zeilinger
67 kg	(Italy) Anita Sanita	(West Germany) Mlascha Blazevic	(Austria) Michaela Huber (Netherlands) Elly Janssen
+67 kg	(Denmark) Else Marie Olsen	(West Germany) Petra Urban	(Italy) Claudia Chiarelli (Netherlands) Annemarie Lancel
