= Kim So-yeong (disambiguation) =

Kim So-yeong (Korean: 김소영) may refer to:

- Kim So-young (taekwondo) (born 1966), South Korean taekwondo practitioner
- So Yong Kim (born 1968), South Korean-born American filmmaker
- Fat Cat (singer) (born 1990), South Korean singer
- Kim So-yeong (born 1992), South Korean badminton player
