= Kim Ji-sook =

Kim Ji-sook may refer to:

- Kim Ji-sook (taekwondo)
- Kim Ji-sook (singer)
