= Taekwondo at the 1986 Asian Games – Men's 54 kg =

Taekwondo competition

Men's 54 kg at the 1986 Asian Games
- Venue: Sungkyunkwan University
- Date: 30 September 1986
- Competitors: 11 from 11 nations

Medalists
gold medal	Kim Young-sik	South Korea
silver medal	Selvamuthu Ramasamy	Malaysia
bronze medal	Anan Meksawan	Thailand
bronze medal	Budi Setiawan	Indonesia

The men's Flyweight (54 kilograms) event at the 1986 Asian Games took place on 30 September 1986 at Sungkyunkwan University, Seoul, South Korea.

A total of eleven competitors from eleven countries competed in this event, limited to fighters whose body weight was less than 54 kilograms. Kim Young-sik of South Korea won the gold medal.

== Schedule ==
All times are Korea Standard Time (UTC+09:00)

Date	Time	Event
Tuesday, 30 September 1986	10:00	Round of 16
Tuesday, 30 September 1986	10:00	Quarterfinals
Tuesday, 30 September 1986	10:00	Semifinals
Tuesday, 30 September 1986	10:00	Final

== Results ==
Legend

- PTS — Won by points
- SUP — Won by superiority

Round of 16
Naohito Ishii (JPN)
Kim Young-sik (KOR)
Ahmed Mohamed Salah (QAT)
Budi Setiawan (INA)
Harishwor Pokharel (NEP)
Mike Ventosa (PHI)

Quarterfinals
Abdullah Al-Najrani (SAU)
Kim Young-sik (KOR)
Manouchehr Nazari (IRN)
Anan Meksawan (THA)	PTS
Anas Mubaidien (JOR)
Budi Setiawan (INA)
Mike Ventosa (PHI)
Selvamuthu Ramasamy (MAL)

Semifinals
Kim Young-sik (KOR)	PTS
Anan Meksawan (THA)
Budi Setiawan (INA)
Selvamuthu Ramasamy (MAL)	SUP

Final
Kim Young-sik (KOR)	PTS
Selvamuthu Ramasamy (MAL)
