= Peter Scanlon =

Peter Scanlon may refer to:

- Peter Scanlon (businessman) (1931–2009), American businessman
- Peter Scanlon (taekwondo) (born 1970), Australian taekwondo practitioner
