= 1984 European Taekwondo Championships =

Taekwondo competition

- Location: Stuttgart, West Germany
- Start date: 26 October
- End date: 28 October

The 1984 European Taekwondo Championships were held in Stuttgart, West Germany. The event took place from 26 to 28 October, 1984.

== Medal summary ==
* Host nation (West Germany)

Rank	Nation	Gold	Silver	Bronze	Total
1	West Germany*	7	4	2	13
2	Spain	3	2	6	11
3	Italy	3	0	5	8
4	Turkey	2	3	2	7
5	Denmark	1	3	2	6
6	Netherlands	1	2	4	7
7	Austria	1	1	1	3
8	France	0	2	4	6
9	Yugoslavia	0	1	2	3
10	Switzerland	0	0	2	2
11	Belgium	0	0	1	1
11	Finland	0	0	1	1
11	Great Britain	0	0	1	1
11	Sweden	0	0	1	1
Totals (14 entries)		18	18	34	70

=== Men ===
Event	Gold	Silver	Bronze
48 kg	Halit Avcı; Turkey	Chan-Ok Choi; West Germany	Benny de Fretes; Netherlands
48 kg	Halit Avcı; Turkey	Chan-Ok Choi; West Germany	Manuel Trabazos; Spain
52 kg	Reinhard Langer; West Germany	Ben Rumeon; Netherlands	Aldo Codazzo; Italy
52 kg	Reinhard Langer; West Germany	Ben Rumeon; Netherlands	Turgut Uçan; Turkey
56 kg	Geremia Di Constanzo; Italy	Cengiz Yağız; Turkey	Martin Baker; Great Britain
56 kg	Geremia Di Constanzo; Italy	Cengiz Yağız; Turkey	Jesús Benito; Spain
60 kg	Lucio Cuozzo; Italy	Thomas Rodriguez; France	Ángel Navarrete; Spain
60 kg	Lucio Cuozzo; Italy	Thomas Rodriguez; France	Daniel Stoll; Switzerland
68 kg	Ruben Thijs; Netherlands	Nusret Ramazanoğlu; Turkey	Peter Ebenfeld; Sweden
68 kg	Ruben Thijs; Netherlands	Nusret Ramazanoğlu; Turkey	Nebojša Tošković; Yugoslavia
73 kg	Andreas Scheffler; West Germany	Anton Maras; Yugoslavia	Per Madsen; Denmark
73 kg	Andreas Scheffler; West Germany	Anton Maras; Yugoslavia	Luigi D'Oriano; Italy
78 kg	Richard Schulz; West Germany	Metin Şahin; Turkey	Angel Bonadei; France
78 kg	Richard Schulz; West Germany	Metin Şahin; Turkey	Robert Tomašević; Yugoslavia
84 kg	Eugen Nefedow; West Germany	Jens Stephansen; Denmark	Carmelo Medina; Spain
84 kg	Eugen Nefedow; West Germany	Jens Stephansen; Denmark	Christian Montjean; France
+84 kg	Anton Ginhart; West Germany	Alain Molle; France	Franz Stöllberger; Austria
+84 kg	Anton Ginhart; West Germany	Alain Molle; France	Kimmo Tirkkonen; Finland

=== Women ===
Event	Gold	Silver	Bronze
48 kg	Tennur Yerlisu; Turkey	Regina Singer; Austria	Antonietta la Pietra; Italy
48 kg	Tennur Yerlisu; Turkey	Regina Singer; Austria	Lucía Martínez; Spain
52 kg	Rafaela Velasco; Spain	Marion Gal; West Germany	Mireille Gosselin; France
52 kg	Rafaela Velasco; Spain	Marion Gal; West Germany	Lisbeth Larsen; Denmark
56 kg	Rocío Valverde; Spain	Wina Hubers van Assenraad; Netherlands	Brigitte Evanno; France
56 kg	Rocío Valverde; Spain	Wina Hubers van Assenraad; Netherlands	Dorothea Kapkowski; West Germany
60 kg	María Paz Gordillo; Spain	Angelika Holzner; West Germany	Janine Basten-Crapels; Netherlands
60 kg	María Paz Gordillo; Spain	Angelika Holzner; West Germany	Maria Genovese; Italy
64 kg	Michaela Huber; Austria	Mette Nielsen; Denmark	Monica Conte; Italy
64 kg	Michaela Huber; Austria	Mette Nielsen; Denmark	Doris Fuchsreiter; West Germany
68 kg	Petra Urban; West Germany	Elena Navaz; Spain	Ingrid Claes; Belgium
68 kg	Petra Urban; West Germany	Elena Navaz; Spain	Mandy de Jongh; Netherlands
73 kg	Else Marie Olsen; Denmark	Sabine Troschke; West Germany	Wendy Baardman; Netherlands
73 kg	Else Marie Olsen; Denmark	Sabine Troschke; West Germany	Olga Mazúa; Spain
+73 kg	Ute Güster; West Germany	Encarna Touriño; Spain	None awarded
