= Alain Kouyate =

Ivorian taekwondo practitioner

Personal information
- Nationality: Ivorian
- Born: 20 September 1963 (age 62)

Sport
- Sport: Taekwondo
- Event: Men's featherweight

Alain Kouyate (born 20 September 1963) is an Ivorian taekwondo practitioner. He competed in the men's featherweight at the 1988 Summer Olympics.
