= Ivica Klaić =

Croatian taekwondo practitioner

Personal information
- Nationality: Croatian
- Born: 15 April 1964 (age 60); Zagreb, Yugoslavia

Sport
- Sport: Taekwondo
- Event: Men's flyweight

Ivica Klaić (born 15 April 1964) is a Croatian taekwondo practitioner. He competed for Yugoslavia in the men's flyweight at the 1988 Summer Olympics.
