= Taekwondo at the 1986 Asian Games – Men's 50 kg =

Taekwondo competition

Men's 50 kg at the 1986 Asian Games
- Venue: Sungkyunkwan University
- Date: 30 September 1986
- Competitors: 11 from 11 nations

Medalists
| gold medal | Lee Jong-sun | South Korea |
| silver medal | Yefi Triaji | Indonesia |
| bronze medal | Bidhan Lama | Nepal |
| bronze medal | Abdullah Al-Ajmi | Kuwait |

The men's Finweight (50 kilograms) event at the 1986 Asian Games took place on 30 September 1986 at Sungkyunkwan University, Seoul, South Korea.

A total of eleven competitors from eleven countries competed in this event, limited to fighters whose body weight was less than 50 kilograms. Lee Jong-sun of South Korea won the gold medal.

== Schedule ==
All times are Korea Standard Time (UTC+09:00)

| Date | Time | Event |
|---|---|---|
| Tuesday, 30 September 1986 | 10:00 | Round of 16 |
| Tuesday, 30 September 1986 | 10:00 | Quarterfinals |
| Tuesday, 30 September 1986 | 10:00 | Semifinals |
| Tuesday, 30 September 1986 | 10:00 | Final |

== Results ==
Legend

- PTS — Won by points
- WD — Won by withdrawal

Round of 16
Adel Darraj (BRN)
Yefi Triaji (INA)
Yonten Tharchen (BHU)
Abdullah Al-Ajmi (KUW)
Arnold Baradi (PHI)
Lee Jong-sun (KOR)

Quarterfinals
Ihsan Abu Sheikha (JOR)
Yefi Triaji (INA)
Abdulrahman Al-Nuaimi (QAT)
Bidhan Lama (NEP)
Amnat Niemtong (THA)
Abdullah Al-Ajmi (KUW)
Lee Jong-sun (KOR)
Hatim Mukhtar (SAU)

Semifinals
Yefi Triaji (INA) | PTS
Bidhan Lama (NEP)
Abdullah Al-Ajmi (KUW)
Lee Jong-sun (KOR) | PTS

Final
Yefi Triaji (INA)
Lee Jong-sun (KOR) | WD
