= 1985 World Taekwondo Championships =

Taekwondo competition

- Venue: Jamsil Arena
- Location: Seoul, South Korea
- Dates: 4–8 September 1985

Champions
- Men: South Korea

The 1985 World Taekwondo Championships were the 7th edition of the World Taekwondo Championships, and were held in Seoul, South Korea, from September 4 to September 8, 1985. There were a total of 63 participating nations and 280 contestants, all male. Women were not invited to compete in the world championships until 1987.

== Medal summary ==
Event	Gold	Silver	Bronze
Finweight (−50 kg)	Lee Sun-jang; South Korea	Dae Sung Lee; United States	Koidio Konan; Ivory Coast
Finweight (−50 kg)	Lee Sun-jang; South Korea	Dae Sung Lee; United States	Abdullah Al-Najrani; Saudi Arabia
Flyweight (−54 kg)	Kim Young-sik; South Korea	Younousse Bathily; Ivory Coast	Geremia Di Costanzo; Italy
Flyweight (−54 kg)	Kim Young-sik; South Korea	Younousse Bathily; Ivory Coast	Sang Hon Cha; United States
Bantamweight (−58 kg)	Yoo Myung-sik; South Korea	Gustavo Sanciprián; Mexico	Feisal Danesh; Iran
Bantamweight (−58 kg)	Yoo Myung-sik; South Korea	Gustavo Sanciprián; Mexico	Cengiz Yağız; Turkey
Featherweight (−64 kg)	Han Jae-koo; South Korea	Ahmet Ercan; Turkey	Lucio Cuozzo; Italy
Featherweight (−64 kg)	Han Jae-koo; South Korea	Ahmet Ercan; Turkey	Iván Tejeda; Dominican Republic
Lightweight (−70 kg)	Park Bong-kwon; South Korea	Pietro Carrieri; Italy	Monsour del Rosario; Philippines
Lightweight (−70 kg)	Park Bong-kwon; South Korea	Pietro Carrieri; Italy	Reuben Thijs; Netherlands
Welterweight (−76 kg)	Jeong Kook-hyun; South Korea	Metin Şahin; Turkey	Patrice Remarck; Ivory Coast
Welterweight (−76 kg)	Jeong Kook-hyun; South Korea	Metin Şahin; Turkey	Jay Warwick; United States
Middleweight (−83 kg)	Lee Dong-jun; South Korea	Hassan Zahedi; Iran	Amr Khairy; Egypt
Middleweight (−83 kg)	Lee Dong-jun; South Korea	Hassan Zahedi; Iran	Douglas Crowper; United States
Heavyweight (+83 kg)	Henk Meijer; Netherlands	Kang Seung-woo; South Korea	Abdoulaye Cissé; Ivory Coast
Heavyweight (+83 kg)	Henk Meijer; Netherlands	Kang Seung-woo; South Korea	Moustafa El-Abrak; Egypt

== Medal table ==
Rank	Nation	Gold	Silver	Bronze	Total
1	South Korea	7	1	0	8
2	Netherlands	1	0	1	2
3	Turkey	0	2	1	3
4	Ivory Coast	0	1	3	4
4	United States	0	1	3	4
6	Italy	0	1	2	3
7	Iran	0	1	1	2
8	Mexico	0	1	0	1
9	Egypt	0	0	2	2
10	Dominican Republic	0	0	1	1
10	Philippines	0	0	1	1
10	Saudi Arabia	0	0	1	1
Totals (12 entries)		8	8	16	32
