= Fred Edenhauser =

Austrian taekwondo practitioner

Personal information
- Nationality: Austrian
- Born: 17 March 1966 (age 59)

Sport
- Sport: Taekwondo
- Event: Men's featherweight

Fred Edenhauser (born 17 March 1966) is an Austrian taekwondo practitioner. He competed in the men's featherweight at the 1988 Summer Olympics.
