= Fayez Al-Daihani =

Kuwaiti taekwondo practitioner

Personal information
- Nationality: Kuwaiti
- Born: 6 July 1962 (age 64)

Sport
- Sport: Taekwondo
- Event: Men's featherweight

Fayez Al-Daihani (born 6 July 1962) is a Kuwaiti taekwondo practitioner. He competed in the men's featherweight at the 1988 Summer Olympics.
