= Dražen Perković =

Croatian taekwondo practitioner

Personal information
- Nationality: Croatian
- Born: 16 March 1963 (age 62); Karlovac, Yugoslavia

Sport
- Sport: Taekwondo
- Event: Men's featherweight

Dražen Perković (born 16 March 1963) is a Croatian taekwondo practitioner. He competed in the men's featherweight at the 1988 Summer Olympics.
