= Dana Hee =

American actress

Personal information
- Born: Dana Lynn Davidson; November 9, 1961 (age 64) Baton Rouge, Louisiana, United States
Medal record
Women's taekwondo
Representing the United States
Olympic Games (demonstration)
Gold medal – first place	1988 Seoul	Lightweight (55–60 kg)

Dana Hee (born as Dana Lynn Davidson on November 9, 1961, in Baton Rouge, Louisiana) is an American martial artist, stuntwoman, action film actress and model, who has also worked as sports color commentator, trainer, spokesperson, motivational speaker and master of ceremonies, as well as a rancher. She was a gold medalist at 1988 Summer Olympics in taekwondo (women's lightweight division).

== Biography ==
=== Martial arts ===
Hee turned to martial arts as a way to regain confidence after having been a victim of sexual and domestic abuse.

She began training in Shotokan karate in 1980, before switching to taekwondo in 1984, where she trained at Mackowski Taekwondo, in Foster City, CA. Since 1989, she has also practiced many other styles for the films, including aikido, boxing, capoeira, jiu jitsu, kung fu, and wrestling.

Aside from her gold medal at the 1988 Summer Olympics, she won gold medals at the 1988 U.S. Olympic Team trials and finals, as well as in 21 national divisional tournaments from 1985 to 1987. She also won silver medals at the U.S. National Championships in 1986, 1987, and 1988, a bronze medal at the Universiade in 1986, four silver and one bronze medals in national divisional tournaments, and finished fifth in her division at the 1987 World Taekwondo Championships. She received the "Female Competitor of the Year Award" and inducted into the U.S. Grandmasters Society Hall of Fame in 2007, and was inducted into the official Taekwondo Hall of Fame in 2013.

=== Film ===
Hee has performed stunts for dozens of films and TV series since 1993, including Batman Forever, Charlie's Angels, Gangs of New York, Independence Day, Lethal Weapon 4, Mortal Kombat, Spider-Man 2, Terminator 3: Rise of the Machines and The Avengers, and was a double for Cameron Diaz, Daryl Hannah, Geena Davis, Gwyneth Paltrow, Jennifer Garner, Nicole Kidman, Rene Russo, Sandra Bullock and Uma Thurman, among others.

Her acting roles included Mileena in Mortal Kombat Annihilation, Siann in Mortal Kombat: Conquest, and the mutated Sil in Species.

=== Other activities ===
Hee has been a television color commentator (local, national, and international taekwondo events), a master of ceremonies (United States Olympic Committee Olympic Academy, U.S. Olympic Festival), San Francisco-Seoul Sister City Fund raiser, television anchor for New Mexico celebrity golf tournament "Legends & Heroes".

She transitioned from full-time stuntwoman to motivational speaking in the early 2000s. Since then, she has spoken for numerous groups and organizations, and contributed time and assistance to philanthropic causes.

Hee's autobiography, One Step with Courage: The Story of My Life From Olympic Gold Medalist to Hollywood Stuntwoman, was released in May 2020. Tae Kwon Do Life Magazine featured her story and book release in March 2021, as part of its International Women's Day Celebration.

== Personal life ==
She married and divorced Brian Hee, keeping his surname professionally.
