= Bernhard Güntner =

German taekwondo practitioner

Personal information
- Nationality: German
- Born: 28 July 1962 (age 62); Ellwangen, West Germany

Sport
- Sport: Taekwondo
- Event: Men's featherweight

Bernhard Güntner (born 28 July 1962) is a German taekwondo practitioner. He competed in the men's featherweight at the 1988 Summer Olympics.
