= Dong Ja Yang =

American martial artist

Dong Ja Yang is the former chairman of the AAU National Taekwondo Union from 1979-84. From 1984-88, He was a member of the Executive Board of the United States Olympic Committee. Earning a Ph.D. in counseling psychology, Yang introduced taekwondo to 77 colleges in the U.S. from 1977-83. During these years, he was essential in helping raise taekwondo to Olympic status. He taught Taekwondo for 40 years at Howard University. In 1986, Yang asked WTF President Kim Un-Yong to lower the black belt fee for taekwondo, which resulted in Yang's removal from the WTF Pan American Taekwondo Union. In 1988, three of his students earned medals in the Seoul Summer Olympics: Lynnette Love, Debra Holloway and Sharon Jewell. He received an award from Congressman Ralph Metcalfe for his work in bringing women to taekwondo. He also hosted the Howard University Taekwondo Championships. In 2001, he filed a complaint against the United States Taekwondo Union. Yang was elected to the Taekwondo Hall of Fame and holds a 9th degree black belt.

== See also ==
- USA Taekwondo
