= Jeffrey Huber =

Dutch taekwondo practitioner

Personal information
- Nationality: Dutch
- Born: 26 June 1959 (age 65)

Sport
- Sport: Taekwondo
- Event: Men's featherweight

Jeffrey Huber (born 26 June 1959) is a Dutch taekwondo practitioner. He competed in the men's featherweight at the 1988 Summer Olympics.
