= Harun Ateş =

Personal information
- Nationality: Turkish
- Born: 9 March 1968 (age 58)
- Weight: 50 kg (110 lb) 54 kg

Sport
- Country: Turkey
- Sport: Taekwondo
Medal record
Men's taekwondo
World Championships
Bronze medal – third place	1989 Seoul	–50 kg
European Championships
Gold medal – first place	1988 Ankara	–50 kg
Silver medal – second place	1986 Seefeld	–50 kg
Silver medal – second place	1992 Valencia	–50 kg
Silver medal – second place	1996 Helsinki	–54 kg

Harun Ateş (born 9 March 1968) is a retired Turkish taekwondo practitioner who competed in the finweight (−50 kg) category. He achieved notable success at both world and European championships during the late 1980s and early 1990s. He competed in the men's finweight at the 1988 Summer Olympics.

== Career ==
In 1988, Ateş represented Turkey at the Seoul Olympic Games, where taekwondo was featured as a demonstration sport. Competing in the men's finweight division, he made it to the quarter-finals, showing early promise on the international stage.

The following year, Ateş earned a bronze medal in the −50 kg category at the 1989 World Taekwondo Championships held in Seoul. He was one of only three Turkish medalists in the tournament.

Ateş also enjoyed sustained success in European competitions. In 1986, he took silver at the European Championships in Seefeld, Austria. Two years later, he improved to gold at the 1988 Championships in Ankara. He later added two more silver medals at the 1992 event in Valencia and in 1996 at Helsinki, consistently ranking among Europe's top lightweight fighters.

Throughout his sporting career, Ateş was recognized for his technical skill and consistency in the finweight division. After retiring from competition, he transitioned into coaching roles, contributing to athlete development in Turkey.
