= Mohamed Al-Wabran =

Saudi taekwondo practitioner

Personal information
- Nationality: Saudi
- Born: 1964 (age 61–62)

Sport
- Sport: Taekwondo
- Event: Men's finweight

Mohamed Al-Wabran (Arabic: محمد الوبران; born 1964) is a Saudi taekwondo practitioner. He competed in the men's finweight at the 1988 Summer Olympics.
