= Josefina López (taekwondo) =

Spanish taekwondo practitioner

Personal information
- Full name: Josefina López Pérez
- Nationality: Spanish
- Born: 29 July 1969 (age 56) Sabadell, Spain

Sport
- Sport: taekwondo
Medal record
Representing Spain
World Championships
Silver medal – second place	1987 Barcelona	Bantamweight (−51 kg)
Bronze medal – third place	1991 Athens	Featherweight (−55 kg)

Josefina López Pérez (born 29 July 1969) is a Spanish former taekwondo practitioner. She won the bronze medal at the 1988 Summer Olympics, where taekwondo was a demonstration sport, in the bantamweight event. At the World Taekwondo Championships she won the silver medal in 1987 and the bronze medal in 1991. At the European Taekwondo Championships she won the silver medal in 1992 and the bronze medal in 1988.
