= Jang Eu-suk =

South Korean taekwondo practitioner

Personal information
- Nationality: South Korean

Sport
- Sport: Taekwondo
Medal record
Representing South Korea
Women's taekwondo
World Championships
Gold medal – first place	1987 Barcelona	Finweight

Jang Eu-suk is a South Korean taekwondo practitioner.

She won a gold medal in finweight at the 1987 World Taekwondo Championships in Barcelona, after defeating Rosa Moreno in the semifinal, and Mónica Torres in the final.
