= Stephen Fernandez =

Filipino taekwondo practitioner and coach

Personal information
- Nationality: Filipino
- Born: December 26, 1967 (age 58)

Sport
- Country: Philippines
- Sport: Taekwondo

Achievements and titles
- Olympic finals: 1992 Summer Olympics: Bantamweight (54–58 kg) Bronze (demonstration)
Medal record
Men's taekwondo
Representing Philippines
Asian Championships
Bronze medal – third place	1988 Kathmandu
SEA Games
Gold medal – first place	1987 Jakarta
Bronze medal – third place	1989 Kuala Lumpur
Bronze medal – third place	1991 Manila

Stephen V. Fernandez is a Filipino taekwondo practitioner and coach.

== Early life and education ==
Stephen Fernandez was born on December 26, 1967. Growing up idolizing Bruce Lee and Jackie Chan, Fernandez and his Korean friend in March 1981 visited Greenhills Shopping Center where he signed up for taekwondo classes.

He is a product of the De La Salle University system, attending from the elementary to college level. He graduated from high school in 1985 and obtained his degree in political science in 1991.

== Career ==
Fernandez have represented the Philippines in international taekwondo competitions. He won a gold medal at the 1987 Southeast Asian (SEA) Games in Jakarta, Indonesia; a bronze in the 1988 Asian Taekwondo Championships in Kathmandu, Nepal; and a bronze each in the 1989 and 1991 SEA Games in Kuala Lumpur, Malaysia and Manila respectively.

Fernandez is a two-time Olympian having competed in the 1988 Summer Olympics in Seoul and the 1992 Summer Olympics in Barcelona although taekwondo was held as a demonstration event for both editions. In 1988, Fernandez competed in the flyweight division but was eliminated early by Geremia Di Costanzo of Italy in the first round. He retroactively attributed his early lost to his arrogance.

In 1992 in Barcelona, Fernandez moved up to the bantamweight division. He wanted to win a medal to dedicate it to his mother who was diagnosed with cancer. He went on to win a bronze medal.

From 1989 to 2013, Fernandez was a coach for the taekwondo team of the De La Salle University. As of 2019, he was the sports head of the College of Saint Benilde.

Fernandez was the senior Deputy Chef de Mission for the Philippine delegation at the 2019 Southeast Asian Games.
