= Kim Dotson =

American taekwondo practitioner

Personal information
- Full name: Kim Dotson
- Nationality: American
- Born: Cleveland, Usa

Sport
- Sport: taekwondo
Medal record
Representing United States
World Championships
Silver medal – second place	1987 Barcelona	Featherweight (−55 kg)
Silver medal – second place	1989 Seoul	Featherweight (−55 kg)

Kim Dotson is a former national level competitor in taekwondo from Cleveland, Ohio, United States. Kim would win the 1985 World Cup. Kim would win gold at the 1986 PanAmerican Championships. Kim would compete in the 1988 Seoul Olympic Games. and would win Silver at both the 1987 and 1989 World Taekwondo Championships. Kim would serve as a coach for several women in taekwondo.
