= Ibrahim Al Gafar =

Saudi taekwondo practitioner

Personal information
- Nationality: Saudi
- Born: 1966 (age 59–60)

Sport
- Sport: Taekwondo
- Event: Men's featherweight

Ibrahim Al Gafar (Arabic: إبراهيم الجفر; born 1966) is a Saudi taekwondo practitioner. He competed in the men's featherweight at the 1988 Summer Olympics.
