= Choo Nan-Yool =

South Korean taekwondo practitioner

Choo Nan-Yool is a South Korean taekwondo practitioner and Olympian.

== Career ==
When taekwondo debuted as a demonstration sport at the 1988 Summer Olympics in Seoul, Choo won a gold medal in the women's flyweight (43 kg to 47 kg) division. She was 16 years old at the time of her win and defeated Maria Angela Naranjo of Spain in the final match by 3 points to 0.5 points.

Choo studied a degree in Taekwondo from Korean National University in Seoul. She is certified by the World Taekwondo Federation as a Master Instructor.

Choo's daughter Binny Lee is a competitive golfer.
