= Pascual Pacheco =

Ecuadorian taekwondo practitioner

Personal information
- Nationality: Ecuadorian
- Born: 1 October 1962 (age 63)

Sport
- Sport: Taekwondo
- Event: Men's finweight

Pascual Pacheco (born 1 October 1962) is an Ecuadorian taekwondo practitioner. He competed in the men's finweight at the 1988 Summer Olympics.
