= Sang-chul Lee (taekwondo) =

South Korean taekwondo practitioner (born 1948)

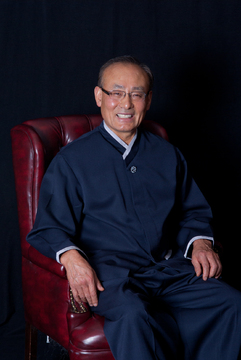
- Born: May 8, 1948 (age 77); Mangyeong, South Korea
- Occupation: Grand Master Kukkiwon 8th Dan in Taekwondo Martial Arts
- Known for: US Olympic Taekwondo Head Coach 1988, created the Axe Kick, Founder of US Taekwondo Center
- Notable work: Founder of US Taekwondo Center, President of USAT (Formerly known as the US Taekwondo Union-USTU, Founder of US Open Taekwondo Championship, Founder of US Open Hanmadang

Sang-chul Lee (Korean: 이상철, born May 8, 1948) is a South Korean-born American Taekwondo grandmaster 8th Dan, US Olympic Taekwondo head coach, entrepreneur, and owner of the US Taekwondo Center. Sang-chul Lee is a leading taekwondo innovator and missionary and has played an instrumental role in the promotion and development of Taekwondo throughout the United States and the world.

He is the longest-tenured US National Taekwondo Team coach, serving from 1979 to 1988. In Taekwondo sparring, Lee is credited with innovating the Ax Kick. During his coaching tenure, he is credited with developing a more versatile fighting stance and developing steps for his athletes to be more fluid in their movements.

Lee was the US Olympic Taekwondo Head Coach at the Seoul Olympics in 1988. Although a demonstration sport, the 1988 US Taekwondo Olympic team is the most decorated of any US Taekwondo Olympic team. Lee's athletes won 11 medals, including 3 golds and finished second to the South Korean team, which at the time was the best in the world.

Lee has been passionately involved in the promotion of Taekwondo throughout the United States and served as USA Taekwondo (formerly US Taekwondo Union) president from 1997 to 2004. In 1992, Lee established the US Open Taekwondo Championships and founded the US Open Hanmadang in 2009.

== Early life ==
Sang-chul Lee was born in Korea in 1948 and was the youngest of six children. The young Lee grew up in the war-torn Korean town of Mangyeong near Gunsan, which is Southwest of Seoul and not far from the coast of the East China Sea (today there is a US Airforce Base at Gunsan). The family lived in a one-room thatched hut at the base of an acre plot where his father scratched out a living as a farmer in the Mangyeong rice fields.

In the summer of 1950, when Lee was 2 years old, the North Korean Army invaded South Korea. The Lee family felt the brunt of the civil war. Lee's oldest sister had married a man from the North near the 38th parallel. When the North Korean Army invaded, the Lees lost contact with their daughter. The family never heard from her again.

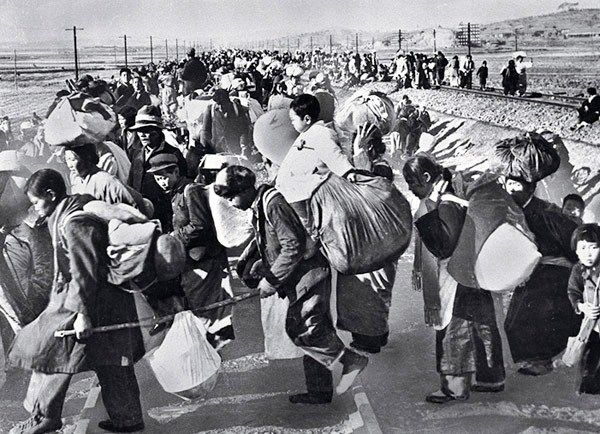
South Korean refugees mid-1950

The family struggled against hunger and starvation, which was pervasive throughout South Korea. The toddler Lee was malnourished and he developed a bad rash, most likely erysipelas, which spread all over his body. The sores bled and would not go away. The Korean doctors tried many types of remedies, to no avail. In desperation, his mother took him to an American M.A.S.H unit stationed nearby. The American doctors gave him penicillin and his rash was cured overnight. This was the first encounter Lee had with the Americans, who would play such a pivotal role in his life.

Lee's martial arts training began at age 11, when he joined his first dojang. His school was a style of Taekwondo called Jidokwan, roughly translated to 'the way of wisdom'. Lee's Master was Grand Master Il-sup Chun, whose brother, Sang-sup Chun, had developed this style of martial art in 1946. Unfortunately, like Lee's sister, Sang-sup Chun was kidnapped by the North during the Korean War. However, his brother maintained the school and contributed heavily to the development of modern-day Taekwondo and many of the techniques found in Olympic Taekwondo Sparring.

The young Lee was quite adept at Jidokwan, earning his black belt within 2 years. He had a reputation as a top martial arts fighter. Like most of the Korean martial artists his age, he had developed a rather cocky attitude as well. This attitude was not tolerated by the older generation. Il Sup Chun admonished Lee and his peers, "Overconfidence is no good. You have to learn control."

As a youngster, Lee also acquired a nickname, Woosong, due to his good nature and loyalty to his friends. Woo means "wants to be friends" and Song means "evergreen" in Korean. Roughly translated, Woosong would be "eternally loyal friend."

As a teenager, Lee was an imposing figure in the Taekwondo ring. He was tall and lanky, with a chiseled face and determined demeanor. Lee was a fighter. Although he was big for a Korean, Lee fought as a welter and middleweight.

Korea in the 1960s was still a poor country. Although the country prided itself on its martial arts prowess, university scholarships were hard to attain. The teenage Lee applied for a scholarship at Korea University. The university accepted him, but since he did not have money to pay the entrance fee, which was around $5,000 at the time, he could not enroll. Lee's future prospects looked bleak. He returned to his family farm to follow in his father's footsteps.

Lee's fortunes were about to change. Korea University had a disastrous Taekwondo season, losing almost every match. The university agreed to waive the entrance fee and offered Lee a scholarship again to study law and to participate on its Taekwondo Team. Lee turned the Korea University Team around. In less than a season, the team went from worst to first, leading the team to four straight national championships.

Lee's dedication and love of Taekwondo led to his success at the university. He did not have much choice. If the team did not win, he risked losing his scholarship. Without much money, Lee could not go out with his friends and on dates. He spent his time in the dojang from earlier in the morning until late at night.

After college, Lee served his mandatory military service in the Marines. He again led his team to national titles. When his competition days ended, Lee coached his Marine's team to additional championships. In 1970, Lee retired undefeated with 13 Korean National Gold medals. Soon thereafter, Lee was inducted into the Korean Sports Hall of Fame.

Later in life, Lee would say, "Without Taekwondo, I could not be the happy man that I am. I am very proud of what has come to me through Taekwondo. Without it, I would have become a small farmer in a small town in Korea producing milk and rice. Because of Taekwondo, I went to college, got a scholarship, was named athlete of the year, received a Hall of Fame honor and became a national champion."

== Coming to America ==
In 1975, Lee immigrated with his wife, Soon Lee, to America. The Lees arrived on Staten Island, New York with $800 in their pockets. Lee's first job was as a janitor at a special education school. He also worked part-time as a Taekwondo instructor. Lee came to America with a much bigger vision of introducing and establishing Taekwondo in America.

In 1976, Lee purchased a small Taekwondo school inside an abandoned warehouse in Binghamton, NY, opening Sang Lee's Black Belt Academy. Running the school was a challenge in and of itself. The school had only 30 students, which was barely enough to cover the business expenses. Across town, Lee faced heavy competition from the popular Karate Master Hidy Ochiai, who owned the biggest Martial Arts school in Binghamton.

Lee was undaunted despite his lack of business acumen and his limited English, and decided to employ a Korean Binghamton University student to translate for him. Lee taught every class at his center and provided free classes at the university. Lee's passion, dedication, and mastery of the Taekwondo was infectious. Word spread quickly about his school, and thus successfully grew. Within a couple of years, Lee had over 300 students.

== Marriage and family ==
Lee married Soon Lee a month before he came to the United States. Two years later, the Lees had their first of four sons, Young Lee, followed by Won Lee, Jay Lee, and Jung Lee. The Lees instilled in their children the five tenets of Taekwondo: Respect, Integrity, Perseverance, Self Control, and Indomitable Spirit. They also emphasized a strong work ethic. The children were taught to work hard, to achieve beyond their potential, and to give back to the community. Lee was fond of saying, "if your opponent does 200 kicks, then you must do 300 kicks. Make no excuses."

== U.S. Olympic Taekwondo Head Coach ==
Sang-chul Lee is the most decorated US Olympic Taekwondo Head coach in history. Although Taekwondo was a demonstration sport at the 1988 Seoul Olympic Games, his US team won 11 medals, including 3 gold, more than any other US Taekwondo Olympic Team.

Lee's coaching success was not easy. In the late 1970s, the US Taekwondo Team was unranked in the world. According to Lee, the team had gone through a series of "fake" masters who knew Taekwondo, but did not know Taekwondo sparring or how to teach it.

Lee's teaching proved instrumental in the U.S. Team's success. Taekwondo athletes traveled from around the country to Binghamton to train under him. Lee was not satisfied with his own teaching. Taekwondo sparring had been somewhat stilted in South Korea in the 1960s. The number of kicks were limited and the movement was back and forth. Lee remarked, "In our time we just kicked, we didn’t move much."

Lee heavily influenced reinvigorating Taekwondo sparring, often credited as developing the "Ax Kick".

He wanted more fluidity in the movement of his athletes so Lee visited a local Arthur Murray Dance Studio in Binghamton. Over the course of several months, with the assistance of the dance instructor, a series of steps for his athletes to use in the ring were developed; Chunjin (sliding forward), Whojin (Sliding backwards), Ilbo Chunjin (step forward), Ilbo Whojin (step backwards), and Yeop steps (side steps). With the new steps came a new fighting (kicking) stance. Koreans fought from a static stance, which did not allow for rapid movement. "For example," stated Lee, "if I kick like [Korean Team], my weight is back, my balance is moved back and if I want to attack again, I must first move my weight forward and then I can kick. This is too slow."

Lee changed the kicking stance of the US athletes. He shortened the length, lifted the heel of the back foot and distributed more weight on the front foot than the back. This new kicking stance was revolutionary for sparring. A Taekwondo athlete could move much faster forward and backward and to the side. Additionally, the stance had an added advantage of allowing for a quicker and greater variety of kicks, especially spinning kicks, which were becoming more popular in the 1980s. According to Lee:

"When we competed [Korea in the 1960s], we could make points with our first or second kick. But these days, the athletes are very fast and they kick continuously - now you need to use four and five kick combinations in order to make a point. That is why I emphasize the short, unstable stance in bringing the leg back fast after each kick, so that you can get ready for the next one while keeping your balance forward so that you can kick continuously and quickly."

The US Team responded to these new innovations accordingly, attributing international competition winnings to the transition, and therefore culminating in the growing success at the 1988 Seoul Olympic Games.

== Founding the U.S. Taekwondo Center ==
Shortly after moving to Colorado Springs, Lee founded the US Taekwondo Center. In typical Lee fashion, he spared no expense. He wanted to build a world-class dojang where Olympic athletes could train and where he could showcase Taekwondo to international athletic directors, especially those from Eastern European Bloc countries when they came to visit the US Olympic Training Center. Lee took out a loan of $250,000 backed by Dr. Pejo, the father of three of his students, to purchase the building and do the renovations.

Lee charged his Taekwondo disciples, Master Steven Silz Carson, Master Michael Weintraub, and Master David Martin with locating and renovating the new dojang. Lee had three requirements for his new USTC dojang, "first, the dojang had to be centrally located. Secondly, it had to be big enough to house several training areas and a weight room. And lastly it had to be close to a McDonald's restaurant because of the profiles and demographics that McDonald's looked for when opening a restaurant were the same."

The first of five USTC dojang locations opened on June 7, 1986, in the heart of Colorado Springs, the USTC Citadel. Lee opened the USTC Lehman Dojang in 1995, the USTC Monument Dojang in 2006, the USTC Briargate Dojang in 2011, and the USTC Stetson Hills Dojang in 2015. The US Taekwondo Center has gained a world renowned reputation and its Hank Logo is recognized in Taekwondo circles around the world.

== Woosong Foundation ==
As a teenager, Lee was nicknamed Woosong by his friends. In Korean, "Woo" means "friend" and song means "evergreen". Taken together, Woosong translates into "ever loyal and faithful friend." Lee felt it appropriate to name his foundation "Woosong". The Woosong Foundation is a non-profit organization established to provide Taekwondo Scholarships to lower-income families. It is Lee's belief that everyone should have the opportunity to participate in Taekwondo.

== Achievements ==
Soure:

EDUCATION:

1971: BS in law from Korea University

1986: Graduated from US Olympic Academy

EXPERIENCE :

2007-Current: president of U.S. Taekwondo Committee

2002-2005: vice president of World Taekwondo Federation, the International Governing body of Taekwondo in the world as recognized by the International Olympic Committee (IOC)

1998-2001: executive council member of World Taekwondo Federation

1997-January 2004: president of United States Taekwondo Union, the National Governing body of Taekwondo in the United States as recognized by the US Olympic Committee (USOC)

1997-2003: Board of directors of United States Olympic Committee (USOC)

1997-1998: member of International Relations Committee of US Olympic Committee

Coaching career:

1995: head of US Taekwondo Team at Pan American Games

1993-1995: commissioner of Taekwondo at US Olympic Festival

1988: first-ever head coach of US Olympic Taekwondo Team in Seoul, Korea

1987: head coach of US Taekwondo Team at Pan American Games

1987: head coach of US Taekwondo Team at 8th World Taekwondo Championships

1985: head coach of US Taekwondo Team at 7th World Taekwondo Championships

1983: head coach of US Taekwondo Team at 6th World Taekwondo Championships

1981: head coach of US Taekwondo Team at 5th World Taekwondo Championships

1979: head coach of US Taekwondo Team at 4th World Taekwondo Championships

Competition career:

1970: Inducted into Korean Taekwondo Hall of Fame by Korean Olympic Committee

1960-70: 13-Time Gold Medalist (Both Intercollegiate and National) in Korea

DEVELOPMENT OF U.S. TAEKWONDO PROGRAMS:

1992: founder of US Open Taekwondo Championships

1988: innovator and producer of First Olympic Taekwondo Training Videos: "Get Ready for the Gold" Parts I & II

1987: Developed program for human adjustment to international travel for competitions with Dr. Jackie Paul of the US Olympic Sports Science Department

1986: Created for the first time a Taekwondo Resident Athlete Training Program at the US Olympic Training Center
