= 1978 European Taekwondo Championships =

Taekwondo competition

- Location: Munich, West Germany
- Start date: 20 October
- End date: 22 October

The 1978 European Taekwondo Championships were held in Munich, West Germany between October 20 and 22, 1978 under the organization of the European Taekwondo Union (ETU).

== Medal table ==
* Host nation (West Germany)

Rank	Nation	Gold	Silver	Bronze	Total
1	West Germany*	4	3	5	12
2	Spain	2	1	1	4
3	Netherlands	1	2	6	9
4	Italy	1	1	3	5
5	Denmark	0	1	0	1
6	Greece	0	0	1	1
Totals (6 entries)		8	8	16	32

== Medalists ==
Weight	Gold	Silver	Bronze
48 kg	(Spain) Manuel Lopez	(Germany) Joaquim Escarmena	(Germany) Reinhard Langer (Netherlands) Tom van Gils
53 kg	(Italy) Geremia Di Constanzo	(Spain) Jesus Benito	(Germany) Hermann Maier (Netherlands) Ludwig van Dalm
58 kg	(Spain) Felipe Walino	(Denmark) Claus Petersen	(Italy) Josef Ascanio (Netherlands) Herman Hartevelt
63 kg	(Germany) Hurbert Leucther	(Netherlands) Johan Lapre	(Italy) Massimo Mancini (Germany) Detlef Weil
68 kg	(Netherlands) Rubens Thijs	(Germany) Karl Wohlfahrt	(Spain) Augustin Denit (Greece) Sisimos Mpelos
74 kg	(Germany) Rainer Muller	(Italy) Bruno Barberio	(Netherlands) Hans Brugsman (Germany) Helmut Gartner
80 kg	(Germany) Richard Schulz	(Netherlands) Tini Dona	(Italy) Vitale Monti (Germany) Gerhard Wiegleb
84+ kg	(Germany) Dirk Jung	(Germany) Uwe Weigel	(Netherlands) Ben Oude Luttikhuis (Netherlands) Harrie van Nijendaal
