= Nassar Al-Otaibi =

Kuwaiti taekwondo practitioner

Personal information
- Nationality: Kuwaiti

Sport
- Sport: Taekwondo
- Event: Men's finweight

Nassar Al-Otaibi is a Kuwaiti taekwondo practitioner. He competed in the men's finweight at the 1988 Summer Olympics.
