= 1983 World Taekwondo Championships =

Taekwondo competition

- Venue: Brøndbyhallen
- Location: Copenhagen, Denmark
- Dates: 20–23 October 1983

Champions
- Men: South Korea

The 1983 World Taekwondo Championships are the 6th edition of the World Taekwondo Championships, and were held in Copenhagen, Denmark from October 20 to October 23, 1983. A total of 353 athletes from 42 nations took part in the championships.

== Medal summary ==
Event	Gold	Silver	Bronze
Finweight (−48 kg)	Wang Kwang-yeon; South Korea	César Rodríguez; Mexico	Choi Chan-ok; West Germany
Finweight (−48 kg)	Wang Kwang-yeon; South Korea	César Rodríguez; Mexico	Emilio Azofra; Spain
Flyweight (−52 kg)	Ko Jeong-ho; South Korea	Turgut Uçan; Turkey	Javier Benito; Spain
Flyweight (−52 kg)	Ko Jeong-ho; South Korea	Turgut Uçan; Turkey	Giuseppe Flotti; Italy
Bantamweight (−56 kg)	Han Hong-sik; South Korea	Luis Torner; Spain	Nader Khodamoradi; Iran
Bantamweight (−56 kg)	Han Hong-sik; South Korea	Luis Torner; Spain	Geremia Di Costanzo; Italy
Featherweight (−60 kg)	Lee Jae-bong; South Korea	Thomas Fabula; West Germany	Ahmet Ercan; Turkey
Featherweight (−60 kg)	Lee Jae-bong; South Korea	Thomas Fabula; West Germany	Gustavo Sanciprián; Mexico
Lightweight (−64 kg)	Han Jae-koo; South Korea	Ángel Navarrete; Spain	Michel Della Negra; France
Lightweight (−64 kg)	Han Jae-koo; South Korea	Ángel Navarrete; Spain	Po-Nhu Ly; Australia
Welterweight (−68 kg)	Yılmaz Helvacıoğlu; Turkey	Lindsay Lawrence; Great Britain	Choi Kwang-keun; South Korea
Welterweight (−68 kg)	Yılmaz Helvacıoğlu; Turkey	Lindsay Lawrence; Great Britain	Harald Scharmann; West Germany
Light middleweight (−73 kg)	Jeong Kook-hyun; South Korea	Hans Brugmans; Netherlands	Patrice Remarck; Ivory Coast
Light middleweight (−73 kg)	Jeong Kook-hyun; South Korea	Hans Brugmans; Netherlands	Luigi D'Oriano; Italy
Middleweight (−78 kg)	Lee Dong-jun; South Korea	Jersey Long; Canada	Charles Bayou; Ivory Coast
Middleweight (−78 kg)	Lee Dong-jun; South Korea	Jersey Long; Canada	Jay Warwick; United States
Light heavyweight (−84 kg)	Ireno Fargas; Spain	Eugen Nefedow; West Germany	John Lee; United States
Light heavyweight (−84 kg)	Ireno Fargas; Spain	Eugen Nefedow; West Germany	Michael Knudsen; Denmark
Heavyweight (+84 kg)	Jang Seong-hwa; South Korea	Dirk Jung; West Germany	Henk Meijer; Netherlands
Heavyweight (+84 kg)	Jang Seong-hwa; South Korea	Dirk Jung; West Germany	Francisco Fonseca; Spain

== Medal table ==
Rank	Nation	Gold	Silver	Bronze	Total
1	South Korea	8	0	1	9
2	Spain	1	2	3	6
3	Turkey	1	1	1	3
4	West Germany	0	3	2	5
5	Mexico	0	1	1	2
5	Netherlands	0	1	1	2
7	Canada	0	1	0	1
7	Great Britain	0	1	0	1
9	Italy	0	0	3	3
10	Ivory Coast	0	0	2	2
10	United States	0	0	2	2
12	Australia	0	0	1	1
12	Denmark	0	0	1	1
12	France	0	0	1	1
12	Iran	0	0	1	1
Totals (15 entries)		10	10	20	40
