= Seelan Rengasamy =

British taekwondo practitioner

Seelan Rengasmy
Personal information
- Nationality: British
- Born: 29 October 1964 (age 60)

Sport
- Sport: Taekwondo
- Event: Men's featherweight
- Coached by: Chris Sawyer

Seelan Rengasmy (born 29 October 1964), also known as Seelan Reneasamy, is a British taekwondo practitioner. He competed in the men's featherweight at the 1988 Summer Olympics.
