= Jay Warwick =

American taekwondo practitioner

Personal information
- Nationality: American
- Born: 14 September 1957 (age 68)

Sport
- Country: United States
- Sport: Taekwondo
Medal record
Representing United States
World Championships
Bronze medal – third place	1983 Copenhagen	Middleweight (−78 kg)
Bronze medal – third place	1985 Seoul	Welterweight (−76 kg)
Bronze medal – third place	1987 Barcelona	Welterweight (−76 kg)

Jay Warwick is a former United States Olympian in taekwondo. Warwick won bronze medals in the 1988 Seoul Olympics and 1987 Barcelona World Championships, gold at the 1986 Pan Am Championships and silver in 1982, bronze at the 1987 Pan Am Games and 8 national titles. In 1999, he became executive director of the United States Taekwondo Union then Director of Sport Partnerships with the United States Olympic Committee in 2003 and in 2018 became Secretary General of USA Taekwondo. Outside sports, he had a long career as a restaurateur.
