= Mostafa Chaichi =

Iranian cyclist (born 1969)

Personal information
- Born: 11 August 1969 (age 57)

Cycling career
- Sport: Cycling

Mostafa Chaichi (Persian: مصطفی چایچی, born 11 August 1969) is an Iranian former cyclist. He competed in two events at the 1988 Summer Olympics.
