= Choi Chan-ok =

Korean-German taekwondo practitioner

Personal information
- Nationality: Korean
- Citizenship: Germany
- Born: 11 February 1961 (age 65) Seoul, South Korea

Sport
- Sport: Taekwondo
- Event: Men's finweight
Medal record
Representing South Korea
World Championships
Bronze medal – third place	1983 Copenhagen	48 kg

Choi Chan-ok (born 11 February 1961) is a Korean-German taekwondo practitioner. He competed in the men's finweight at the 1988 Summer Olympics.
