= Fariborz Danesh =

Iranian taekwondo practitioner

Personal information
- Nationality: Iranian
- Born: 21 March 1963 (age 63)

Sport
- Sport: Taekwondo
- Event: Men's finweight
Medal record
Men's taekwondo
Representing Iran
World Championships
Bronze medal – third place	1989 Seoul	54 kg

Fariborz Danesh (Persian: فریبرز دانش, born 21 March 1963) is an Iranian taekwondo practitioner. He competed in the men's finweight at the 1988 Summer Olympics.
