= Mónica Torres =

Mexican taekwondo practitioner

Personal information
- Nationality: Mexican

Sport
- Sport: Taekwondo
Medal record
Representing Mexico
Women's taekwondo
World Championships
Silver medal – second place	1987 Barcelona	Finweight
Silver medal – second place	1989 Seoul	Finweight
Pan American Championships
Gold medal – first place	1988 Lima	-43 kg
Bronze medal – third place	1990 Bayamon	-43 kg

Mónica Torres is a Mexican taekwondo practitioner.

She won a silver medal in finweight at the 1987 World Taekwondo Championships in Barcelona, after being defeated by Jang Eu-suk in the final. She won a silver medal in finweight at the 1989 World Taekwondo Championships, after being defeated by Chin Yu-fang in the final. She won a gold medal at the 1988 Pan American Taekwondo Championships, and a bronze medal in 1990.
