= Metin Şahin =

Turkish taekwondo practitioner

Personal information
- Nationality: Turkish
- Born: January 10, 1963 (age 63) Konya, Turkey

Sport
- Country: Turkey
- Sport: Taekwondo
- Event(s): Middleweight, welterweight
Medal record
World Championships
Bronze medal – third place	1991 Athems	Middleweight
Silver medal – second place	1985 Seoul	Welterweight
European Championships
Gold medal – first place	1990 Aarhus	Middleweight
Silver medal – second place	1988 Ankara	Middleweight
Gold medal – first place	1986 Seefeld	Middleweight
Silver medal – second place	1984 Stuttgart	Welterweight

Metin Şahin (born January 10, 1963) is a Turkish taekwondo practitioner. He is a former European champion. He served as the President of the Turkish Taekwondo Federation in 2003–2024 and at the same time, he was appointed as dean of Selçuk University Faculty of Sports Sciences.

== Early life and academic career ==
He was born in Konya, where he completed his primary and secondary education. Metin Şahin graduated in 1987 from the School of Physical Education and Sports of the Gazi University in Ankara. In 1988, he was appointed instructor for physical education and sports at the Selçuk University in his hometown. During his service at the university, he initiated the establishment of Taekwondo training at sports schools of many Turkish universities, and so contributed to widespread of this sports branch. He achieved a master's degree in 1992. In 2002, Şahin received a Ph.D. degree with a thesis on Taekwondo training from the Selçuk University. Since 2003, Şahin is assistant professor at the same university. He is author of a number of scientific publications and books on Taekwondo training.

== Sports ==
He began with Taekwondo in 1975. In 1982, Şahin became Turkish champion, and was selected to the national team the next year. He served several years as the captain of the national team. Between 1984 and 1994, he competed at world and European championships, and represented Turkey at two Pre Olympic Games. In 1995, 1986 and 1991 he was honored "Sportsperson of the Year" by the Turkish media.

Şahin was elected in November 2003 president of the Turkey Taekwondo Federation. In August 2004, he became a board member of the World Taekwondo Federation (WTF). The next year, he was re-elected to the board, and was appointed chairman of the youth commission of the WTF. In October 2007, he was elected to the board of European Taekwondo Union (ETU), where he presides the Balkan countries commission.

== Achievements ==
1984

- 5th European Taekwondo Championships in Stuttgart, Germany – Silver
- Antalya Tournament in Turkey – Gold
- Austria-Turkey Biletaral Tournament in Austria – Gold
- Belgium Open Tournament – Gold

1985

- 1st Mediterranean Cup in Yugoslavia – Gold
- 7th World Seniors Taekwondo Championships in Seoul, South Korea – Silver
- Helsinki Open Tournament in Finland – Bronze
- Cyprus Tournament – Gold

1986

- 1st ETU Presidentship Tournament in İzmir, Turkey – Gold
- European Taekwondo Championships in Seefeld, Austria – Gold
- Belgium Open Tournament – Gold

1987

- Belgium Open Tournament – Gold

1988

- 7th European Taekwondo Championships in Ankara, Turkey – Silver
- Pre Olympic Games in Seoul, South Korea – Bronze

1990

- Centenary Friendship Tournament in Japan – Gold
- 8th European Taekwondo Championships in Aarhus, Denmark – Gold

1991

- 10th World Seniors Taekwondo Championships in Athens, Greece – Bronze
