= Enrique Torroella =

Mexican taekwondo practitioner

Personal information
- Born: Enrique Torroella Sánchez; 18 July 1969 (age 56) Monterrey, Mexico

Sport
- Sport: Taekwondo
- Event: Men's finweight
Medal record
Representing Mexico
World Championships
Silver medal – second place	1987 Barcelona	-50 kg

Enrique Torroella Sánchez (Note: In this Spanish name, the first or paternal surname is Torroella and the second or maternal family name is Sánchez.) (born 18 July 1969) is a Mexican taekwondo practitioner. He competed in the men's finweight at the 1988 Summer Olympics.
