= 1980 European Taekwondo Championships =

Taekwondo competition

- Location: Esbjerg, Denmark
- Start date: 14 October
- End date: 17 October

The 1980 European Taekwondo Championships were held in Esbjerg Denmark between October 14 and 17, 1980 under the organization of the European Taekwondo Union (ETU).

== Medal table ==
* Host nation (Denmark)

Rank	Nation	Gold	Silver	Bronze	Total
1	West Germany	7	2	3	12
2	Italy	4	5	5	14
3	Netherlands	3	3	4	10
4	Great Britain	2	0	0	2
5	Denmark*	1	4	5	10
6	Spain	0	1	6	7
7	Austria	0	1	0	1
7	Turkey	0	1	0	1
9	Belgium	0	0	3	3
10	France	0	0	1	1
Totals (10 entries)		17	17	27	61

== Medal summary ==
=== Men ===
Event	Gold	Silver	Bronze
48 kg	(West Germany) Reinhard Langer	(Italy) Roberto Pettineo	(Spain) Emilio Azofra
52 kg	(Netherlands) Rudy Wong Fat	(Denmark) John Willy Hansen	(Italy) A.Barbatol (Germany) Axel Straube
56 kg	(Italy) Geremia Di Constanzo	(Spain) Jesus Benito	(Belgium) Christan Aubert (West Germany) Michael Pizybyla
60 kg	(Italy) Raffaele Marchione	(Denmark) Jimmi Nakel	(Netherlands) Adrian van Esch (Spain) Antonio Vilches
68 kg	(United Kingdom) Lindsay Lawrence	(Turkey) Yılmaz Helvacıoğlu	(Denmark) Kent Jakobsen (Netherlands) Ruben Thijs
73 kg	(United Kingdom) Chris Sawyer	(Denmark) Per Madsen	(Spain) Jose Sanchez Elez (Netherlands) Hans Spierings
78 kg	(West Germany) Richard Schulz	(Denmark) John Pedersen	(France) Patrick Stanczak
84- kg	(West Germany) Dirk Jung	(Netherlands) Ben Oude Luttikhuis	(Spain) Rafael Devesa (Italy) Walter Gacciatore

=== Women ===
Event	Gold	Silver	Bronze
44 kg	(Denmark) Laila Jensen	(Italy) Chiara Mastroianni	None awarded
48 kg	(Italy) Antonietta la Pietra	(West Germany) Marion Gal	None awarded
52 kg	(Italy) Elvira Trovato	(West Germany) Ursula Mach	(Netherlands) J. Kottelaar (Denmark) Una Møller-Petersen
57 kg	(West Germany) Dorothea Kapkowski	(Italy) Pasqualina Mirabella	(Denmark) Lene Lauridsen
62 kg	(West Germany) Sabine Hunkel	(Netherlands) Jolanda Basten-Crapels	(Belgium) Gerda Hendrix (Italy) Filomena la Marca
67 kg	(West Germany) Sylvia Winkelmann	(Italy) Anita Sanita	(Denmark) Helle Mølby (Belgium) Linda Michielsen
+67 kg	(Netherlands) Sonja Pool	(Italy) Anna Costa	(West Germany) Jutta Gauss
