= Peter Scanlon (taekwondo) =

Australian taekwondo practitioner

Personal information
- Nationality: Australian
- Born: 3 January 1970 (age 55)

Sport
- Sport: Taekwondo
- Event: Men's flyweight

Peter Scanlon (born 3 January 1970) is an Australian taekwondo practitioner. He competed in the men's flyweight at the 1988 Summer Olympics.
