= Siamak Safarzadeh =

Iranian cyclist

Personal information
- Born: 5 May 1964 (age 62)

Cycling career
- Sport: Cycling

Siamak Safarzadeh (Persian: سیامک صفرزاده, born 5 May 1964) is an Iranian former cyclist. He competed in two events at the 1988 Summer Olympics.
