= Han Won Lee =

American taekwondo practitioner

Han Won Lee is a former US Olympian. Han tore his PCL prior to the Olympic Trials and would still make the 1988 Summer Olympics. He was selected for the US Olympic team and competed in the 1988 Olympics in the Taekwondo event and earned a Bronze Medal. In 1991, Scott Fujii bowed out to let Han compete in the Pan American Games.
