= Pai Yun-yao =

Taiwanese taekwondo practitioner

Pai Yun-yiao
Personal information
- Nationality: Taiwanese
- Born: 14 March 1969 (age 57)

Sport
- Sport: Taekwondo
Medal record
Representing Chinese Taipei
Women's taekwondo
World Championships
Gold medal – first place	1987 Barcelona	Flyweight
Silver medal – second place	1989 Seoul	Flyweight

Pai Yun-yiao (Chinese: 白允瑤; pinyin: Bái Yǔnyáo; born 14 March 1969), also known as Elva Adams, is a Taiwanese taekwondo practitioner.

== Early life and education ==
Pai was born in Taipei, Taiwan on March 14, 1969. She began training in taekwondo when she was 13 years old under coach Raymond Hsu. After two years, she earned her black belt and soon started competing in international tournaments representing Chinese Taipei.

In the early 1990s, Pai moved to the United States and attended University of Texas at San Antonio using the money she had earned from winning taekwondo competitions. She graduated in 1995 with a bachelor's degree in accounting.

== Career ==
Pai won a bronze medal at the 1986 Asian Taekwondo Championships. She won a gold medal in flyweight at the 1987 World Taekwondo Championships in Barcelona. Pai won a bronze medal in women's flyweight at the 1988 Summer Olympic Games in Seoul, South Korea, where taekwondo debuted at the Olympics as a demonstration sport. She won a silver medal at the 1989 World Taekwondo Championships, after being defeated by Won Sun-jin in the final.

As of 2016, Pai works as vice president of business banking at Wells Fargo. She remains active in the international taekwondo community as a referee, coach, and poomsae competitor. At the 2016 Summer Olympic Games in Rio de Janeiro, Brazil, she became the first female international referee from the United States to officiate taekwondo. She currently serves as an international referee for World Taekwondo. She coached the United States women's taekwondo team at the 2014 World Taekwondo Championships in Mexico, where they won bronze. In 2016, she won the silver medal for Woman's Team Over 30 at the World Taekwondo Poomsae Championships in Lima, Peru. In February 2024, Pai was appointed president of Kombat Taekwondo's central United States region.

== Personal life ==
Pai is a naturalized American citizen. She resides in San Antonio, Texas.

Pai married her coach, Raymond Hsu, at age 17. They have since separated. As of 2016, Pai's romantic partner is Team USA Taekwondo coach Brian Singer.

Pai has two children.
