= Liu Yi-ling =

Taiwanese taekwondo practitioner

Personal information
- Nationality: Taiwanese

Sport
- Sport: Taekwondo
Medal record
Representing Chinese Taipei
Women's taekwondo
World Championships
Silver medal – second place	1987 Barcelona	Heavyweight
Asian Championships
Gold medal – first place	1990 Taipei	-70 kg
Silver medal – second place	1986 Darwin	+70 kg

Liu Yi-ling is a Taiwanese taekwondo practitioner. She won a silver medal in heavyweight at the 1987 World Taekwondo Championships. She won a silver medal at the 1986 Asian Taekwondo Championships in Darwin, and a gold medal at the 1990 Asian Championships.
