= 1987 World Taekwondo Championships =

World Taekwondo competition

- Venue: Palau dels Esports
- Location: Barcelona, Spain
- Dates: 7–11 October 1987

Champions
- Men: South Korea
- Women: South Korea

The 1987 World Taekwondo Championships were the 8th edition of the World Taekwondo Championships, and were held in Barcelona, Spain from October 7 to October 11, 1987, with 434 athletes participating from 62 countries.

== Medal summary ==
=== Men ===
Event	Gold	Silver	Bronze
Finweight (−50 kg)	Lim Sung-wook; South Korea	Enrique Torroella; Mexico	Dae Sung Lee; United States
Finweight (−50 kg)	Lim Sung-wook; South Korea	Enrique Torroella; Mexico	Bidhan Lama; Nepal
Flyweight (−54 kg)	Kang Chang-mo; South Korea	Budi Setiawan; Indonesia	Geremia Di Costanzo; Italy
Flyweight (−54 kg)	Kang Chang-mo; South Korea	Budi Setiawan; Indonesia	Younousse Bathily; Ivory Coast
Bantamweight (−58 kg)	Yoo Myung-sik; South Korea	Şakir Bezci; Turkey	Nuno Dâmaso; Switzerland
Bantamweight (−58 kg)	Yoo Myung-sik; South Korea	Şakir Bezci; Turkey	Alf Dell'orso; Australia
Featherweight (−64 kg)	Lee Chian-hsiang; Chinese Taipei	Luis Torner; Spain	Mustafa Elmalı; Turkey
Featherweight (−64 kg)	Lee Chian-hsiang; Chinese Taipei	Luis Torner; Spain	Chris Spence; United States
Lightweight (−70 kg)	Yang Dae-seung; South Korea	Jesús Tortosa; Spain	Steve Capener; United States
Lightweight (−70 kg)	Yang Dae-seung; South Korea	Jesús Tortosa; Spain	Georg Streif; West Germany
Welterweight (−76 kg)	Jeong Kook-hyun; South Korea	Juan Wright; Spain	Thorsten Gernhardt; West Germany
Welterweight (−76 kg)	Jeong Kook-hyun; South Korea	Juan Wright; Spain	Jay Warwick; United States
Middleweight (−83 kg)	Lee Kye-haeng; South Korea	Francisco Jiménez; Spain	Herbert Perez; United States
Middleweight (−83 kg)	Lee Kye-haeng; South Korea	Francisco Jiménez; Spain	Ammar Fahed Sbeihi; Jordan
Heavyweight (+83 kg)	Michael Arndt; West Germany	Jimmy Kim; United States	Carmelo Medina; Spain
Heavyweight (+83 kg)	Michael Arndt; West Germany	Jimmy Kim; United States	Mounir Boukrouh; France

=== Women ===
Event	Gold	Silver	Bronze
Finweight (−43 kg)	Jang Eu-suk; South Korea	Mónica Torres; Mexico	Rosa Moreno; Spain
Finweight (−43 kg)	Jang Eu-suk; South Korea	Mónica Torres; Mexico	Chin Yu-fang; Chinese Taipei
Flyweight (−47 kg)	Pai Yun-yao; Chinese Taipei	Lee Young; South Korea	Ginean Hatter; United States
Flyweight (−47 kg)	Pai Yun-yao; Chinese Taipei	Lee Young; South Korea	Antonia Cayetano; Spain
Bantamweight (−51 kg)	Tennur Yerlisu; Turkey	Josefina López; Spain	Margarita Ogarrio; Mexico
Bantamweight (−51 kg)	Tennur Yerlisu; Turkey	Josefina López; Spain	Tung Ya-ling; Chinese Taipei
Featherweight (−55 kg)	Kim So-young; South Korea	Kim Dotson; United States	Züleyha Tan; Turkey
Featherweight (−55 kg)	Kim So-young; South Korea	Kim Dotson; United States	Anne-Mette Christensen; Denmark
Lightweight (−60 kg)	Lee Eun-young; South Korea	Hsien Feng-lien; Chinese Taipei	Brigitte Evanno; France
Lightweight (−60 kg)	Lee Eun-young; South Korea	Hsien Feng-lien; Chinese Taipei	Elena Navaz; Spain
Welterweight (−65 kg)	Coral Bistuer; Spain	Kim Ji-sook; South Korea	Tessa Gordon; Canada
Welterweight (−65 kg)	Coral Bistuer; Spain	Kim Ji-sook; South Korea	Tang Hui-ting; Chinese Taipei
Middleweight (−70 kg)	Mandy de Jongh; Netherlands	Wang Chin-yu; Chinese Taipei	Sharon Jewell; United States
Middleweight (−70 kg)	Mandy de Jongh; Netherlands	Wang Chin-yu; Chinese Taipei	Angelika Biegger; West Germany
Heavyweight (+70 kg)	Lynnette Love; United States	Liu Yi-ling; Chinese Taipei	Jang Yoon-jung; South Korea
Heavyweight (+70 kg)	Lynnette Love; United States	Liu Yi-ling; Chinese Taipei	Anne-Mieke Buijs; Netherlands

== Medal table ==
Rank	Nation	Gold	Silver	Bronze	Total
1	South Korea	9	2	1	12
2	Chinese Taipei	2	3	3	8
3	Spain	1	5	4	10
4	United States	1	2	7	10
5	Turkey	1	1	2	4
6	West Germany	1	0	3	4
7	Netherlands	1	0	1	2
8	Mexico	0	2	1	3
9	Indonesia	0	1	0	1
10	France	0	0	2	2
11	Australia	0	0	1	1
11	Canada	0	0	1	1
11	Denmark	0	0	1	1
11	Italy	0	0	1	1
11	Ivory Coast	0	0	1	1
11	Jordan	0	0	1	1
11	Nepal	0	0	1	1
11	Switzerland	0	0	1	1
Totals (18 entries)		16	16	32	64
