= Geremia Di Costanzo =

Italian taekwondo practitioner (born 1960)

Personal information
- Nationality: Italian
- Born: 19 December 1960 (age 65) Pozzuoli, Italy

Sport
- Sport: Taekwondo
- Event: Men's flyweight
Medal record
Men's taekwondo
Representing Italy
World Championships
Bronze medal – third place	1983 Copenhagen	–56 kg
Bronze medal – third place	1985 Seoul	–54 kg
Bronze medal – third place	1987 Barcelona	–54 kg
European Championships
Gold medal – first place	1978 Munich	–53 kg
Gold medal – first place	1980 Copenhagen	–56 kg
Gold medal – first place	1982 Rome	–56 kg
Gold medal – first place	1984 Stuttgart	–56 kg
Gold medal – first place	1988 Ankara	–54 kg
Bronze medal – third place	1986 Seefeld	–54 kg

Geremia Di Costanzo (born 19 December 1960) is an Italian taekwondo practitioner. He is also known as Geremia Di Constanzo or Gabriel Di Costanzo. He competed in the men's flyweight at the 1988 Summer Olympics.
