= Chang Myung-sam =

South Korean taekwondoin (1963–2012)

Personal information
- Nationality: Korean
- Born: 16 May 1962 Seoul, South Korea
- Died: 23 April 2012 (aged 49) Gwangju, Gyeonggi, South Korea

Sport
- Sport: Taekwondo
- Event: Men's featherweight

Chang Myung-sam (16 May 1963 – 23 April 2012) was a Korean taekwondo practitioner. He competed in the men's featherweight at the 1988 Summer Olympics. He died in a car accident in 2012.
