= Jang Yoon-jung =

South Korean taekwondo practitioner

Personal information
- Nationality: South Korean
- Born: 11 June 1966 (age 60)

Sport
- Sport: taekwondo
Medal record
Representing South Korea
World Championships
Bronze medal – third place	1987 Barcelona	Heavyweight (+70 kg)
Asian Championships
Gold medal – first place	1988 Kathmandu	70 kg

Jang Yoon-jung (born 11 June 1966) is a South Korean former taekwondo practitioner. She won the silver medal at the 1988 Summer Olympics, where taekwondo was a demonstration sport, in the heavyweight event. At the 1988 Asian Taekwondo Championships she became Asian Champion in the heavyweight category.
