= Kwon Tae-ho =

Korean taekwondo practitioner

Tae-ho Kwon
Personal information
- Nationality: Korean
- Born: 7 January 1971 (age 54)

Sport
- Sport: Taekwondo
- Event: Men's finweight

Tae-ho Kwon (born 7 January 1971) is a Korean taekwondo practitioner. He competed in the men's finweight at the 1988 Summer Olympics winning the Gold medal.

== Biography ==
Born in Korea, Kwon decided to study taekwondo at a young age after being impressed by older taekwondo students walking in their doboks on the street. He later attended junior high and high school on a sports scholarship. He competed in several international taekwondo competitions including Asian Championships, World Championships, and the 1988 Olympic Games. In the 90's, Kwon immigrated to the United States and settled in Southern California where he lives with his family and he currently runs a taekwondo studio.

== Career highlights ==
- 1992 Asian Championships: GOLD
- 1991 World Cup: GOLD
- 1989 World Championships: GOLD
- 1988 Pre Olympic Games: GOLD
- 1988 Asian Championships: GOLD
- 1988 Olympics: GOLD
