= Hwang Yao-han =

Taiwanese taekwondo practitioner

Hwang Yao-Han
Personal information
- Nationality: Taiwanese
- Born: 30 March 1969 (age 55)

Sport
- Sport: Taekwondo
- Event: Men's finweight

Hwang Yao-han (born 30 March 1969) is a Taiwanese taekwondo practitioner. He competed in the men's finweight at the 1988 Summer Olympics.
