= Wang Chin-yu =

Taiwanese taekwondo practitioner

Personal information
- Nationality: Taiwanese

Sport
- Sport: Taekwondo
Medal record
Representing Chinese Taipei
Women's taekwondo
World Championships
Silver medal – second place	1987 Barcelona	Middleweight
Asian Championships
Bronze medal – third place	1986 Darwin	-70 kg

Wang Chin-yu is a Taiwanese taekwondo practitioner. She won a silver medal in middleweight at the 1987 World Taekwondo Championships, after being defeated by Mandy de Jongh in the final. She won a bronze medal at the 1986 Asian Taekwondo Championships in Darwin, Australia.
