= Naohito Ishii =

Japanese taekwondo practitioner

Naohito lshii
Personal information
- Nationality: Japanese
- Born: 25 December 1963 (age 61); Japan

Sport
- Sport: Taekwondo
- Event: Men's finweight

Naohito lshii (born 25 December 1963) is a Japanese taekwondo practitioner. He competed in the men's finweight at the 1988 Summer Olympics.
