= Cengiz Yağız =

Turkish taekwondo practitioner

Personal information
- Nationality: Turkish
- Born: January 1, 1964 (age 62) Ankara, Turkey
- Weight: 56 kg (123 lb) –58 kg –64 kg

Sport
- Country: Turkey
- Sport: Taekwondo
Medal record
Men's taekwondo
World Championships
Bronze medal – third place	1985 Seoul	58 kg
European Championships
Silver medal – second place	1984 Stuttgart	56 kg
Silver medal – second place	1988 Ankara	64 kg
Bronze medal – third place	1986 Seefeld	64 kg

Cengiz Yağız (born 1964) is a Turkish former taekwondo practitioner and sports administrator. He competed internationally during the 1980s and won medals at both World and European Taekwondo Championships. Yağız later served as president of the Turkey Taekwondo Federation from 1996 to 2003.

== Career ==
Yağız competed for Turkey in three different weight classes: –56 kg, –58 kg, and –64 kg. He won his first major international medal, a silver, at the 1984 European Taekwondo Championships in Stuttgart, Germany. The following year, he claimed a bronze at the 1985 World Taekwondo Championships in Seoul, South Korea.

In 1986, Yağız added another bronze medal at the European Championships held in Seefeld, Austria. At the 1988 European Championships in Ankara, Turkey, he won his second European silver in the –64 kg division, establishing himself as one of the leading Turkish taekwondo athletes of his era.

After retiring from competition, Yağız became an influential sports official. He served as president of the Turkish Taekwondo Federation from 1996 to 2003. In 2012, he announced his intention to run again for the position.
