= Debra Holloway =

American taekwondo practitioner

Personal information
- Born: January 23, 1955
- Died: 2011
Medal record
Women's taekwondo
Representing the United States
Olympic Games (demonstration)
Silver medal – second place	1988 Seoul	Bantamweight (47–51 kg)

Debra Holloway (January 23, 1955 – 2011) was a former U.S. Olympian in Taekwondo. She was a seven-time US bantamweight champion, and earned a silver medal in the 1988 Seoul Olympics despite fighting her final round with a broken finger. She attended Howard University and trained in Taekwondo under Dong Ja Yang.
