= Ebenezer Ghansah =

British taekwondo practitioner

Personal information
- Nationality: British
- Born: 5 May 1959 (age 65)

Sport
- Sport: Taekwondo
- Event: Men's finweight

Ebenezer Ghansah (born 5 May 1959) is a British taekwondo practitioner. He competed in the men's finweight at the 1988 Summer Olympics.
