= Mansour Bagheri =

Iranian taekwondo practitioner

Mansour Bagheri (Persian: منصور باقری) is an Iranian retired Taekwondo athlete who represented Iran in two Olympic Games 1988 and 1992, finishing in the +83 kg 5th place both times.
