= Dario Manca =

Italian taekwondo practitioner

Personal information
- Nationality: Italian
- Born: 27 November 1966 (age 59) Lecce, Italy

Sport
- Sport: Taekwondo
- Event: Men's finweight

Dario Manca (born 27 November 1966) is an Italian taekwondo practitioner. He competed in the men's finweight at the 1988 Summer Olympics.
