= Kim Ji-sook (taekwondo) =

South Korean taekwondo practitioner

Personal information
- Nationality: South Korean
- Born: 1 April 1967 (age 59)

Sport
- Country: South Korea
- Sport: taekwondo
Medal record
Representing South Korea
World Championships
Silver medal – second place	1987 Barcelona	Welterweight (−65 kg)
Asian Championships
Gold medal – first place	1988 Kathmandu	Welterweight (−65 kg)

Kim Ji-sook (born 1 April 1967) is a South Korean former taekwondo practitioner. She won the silver medal at the 1988 Summer Olympics, where taekwondo was a demonstration sport, in the welterweight event. At the Asian Taekwondo Championships she became Asian Champion in 1988.
