= Jimmy Kim =

American taekwondo practitioner (1967–2023)

Personal information
- Full name: Jimmy Young Kim
- Nickname: Jim
- Born: April 11, 1967 Cerritos, California, U.S.
- Died: June 23, 2023 (aged 56)
- Education: Martial Arts, Cerritos High School, Cal State Long Beach, UC Berkeley, LA College of Chiropractic (SCUHS)
- Height: 6 ft 3 in (191 cm)
- Weight: 210 lb (95 kg)
- Spouse: Lauren Kim

Sport
- Country: USA
- Sport: Taekwondo
Medal record
Men's taekwondo
Representing the United States
Olympic Games (demonstration)
Gold medal – first place	1988 Seoul	Heavyweight (+83 kg)
World Taekwondo Championships
Silver medal – second place	1987 Barcelona	Heavyweight
World Cup Taekwondo Championships
Gold medal – first place	1987 Helsinki	Heavyweight
10th Pan Am Games
Gold medal – first place	1987 Indianapolis, IN	Heavyweight
1986 US Olympic Sports Festival
Gold medal – first place	1985 Houston, TX	Heavyweight
2nd World Games
Gold medal – first place	1985 London	Heavyweight

Jimmy Young Kim (April 11, 1967 – June 23, 2023) was a Korean American taekwondo practitioner and instructor who won a gold medal in the heavyweight division at the 1988 Summer Olympics in Seoul, South Korea.

Kim earned a bachelor's degree in biology with an emphasis on Human Physiology from the University of California Berkeley.

After graduating from UC Berkeley, he earned a Doctor of Chiropractic Degree from the Los Angeles College of Chiropractic, now known as the Southern California University of Health Sciences.

Kim died on June 23, 2023, at the age of 56 from dermatomyositis.

== Former Students ==
- Charlotte Craig, U.S. Olympian, Beijing 2008
- Gina-Louise Williams, U.S. Collegiate National Team, Korea
- Kira Cramer, U.S. Collegiate National Team, Madrid, Spain
- Troy Lunn, U.S. Junior National Team
- Muhammad Chishti, U.S. Poomsae National Team, WTF Poomsae World Championships, Ankara, Turkey
- Lilian Angel, Poomsae National Team, WTF Poomsae World Championships, Ankara, Turkey
- Skylar Farrell, 2016, 2017, 2018 AAU National Team, 2019 USAT All American
- Noah Kim, 2018 AAU Junior National Team, 2018 USAT All-American, 2019 USAT All American
- Nicholas Kim, 2019 AAU Cadet National Team
- Siena Nguyen, 2019 AAU Cadet National Team
- Ocean Farrell, 2016 AAU Mini Cadet National B-Team
