= Lee Eun-young (taekwondo) =

South Korean taekwondo practitioner

Personal information
- Nationality: South Korean

Sport
- Sport: Taekwondo
Medal record
Representing South Korea
Women's taekwondo
World Championships
Gold medal – first place	1987 Barcelona	Lightweight
Gold medal – first place	1989 Seoul	Lightweight
Asian Championships
Gold medal – first place	1988 Kathmandu	-60 kg

Lee Eun-young is a South Korean taekwondo practitioner.

She won a gold medal in lightweight at the 1987 World Taekwondo Championships in Barcelona. She won a gold medal at the 1988 Asian Taekwondo Championships, and a gold medal at the 1989 World Taekwondo Championships in Seoul.
