= Vicky Rumeon =

Dutch taekwondo practitioner

Personal information
- Nationality: Dutch
- Born: 23 June 1962 (age 63)

Sport
- Sport: Taekwondo
- Event: Men's finweight

Vicky Rumeon (born 23 June 1962) is a Dutch taekwondo practitioner. He competed in the men's finweight at the 1988 Summer Olympics.
