= Henk Meijer =

Dutch taekwondo practitioner

- Born: Hendrik Meijer; 22 July 1959 (age 67); Winschoten, Netherlands
- Division: Heavyweight
- Style: Taekwondo
- Teachers: Jan Suiveer, Wim Bos
- Rank: 6th dan taekwondo (WTF)

Other information
- Occupation: Taekwondo coach
- Children: Desi Meijer, Aileen Meijer
- Website: http://www.henkmeijertkd.nl/

Henk Meijer (born 22 July 1959) is a Dutch taekwondo coach and former Olympic taekwondo competitor. He was the men's heavyweight champion at the 7th World Taekwondo Championships in 1985, becoming the first non-Korean to win a world title in taekwondo in South Korea. He was Olympic taekwondo coach for the Netherlands at the 2000 and 2004 Summer Olympics, and was later national taekwondo coach for France. In February 2010, he began working as Head Coach for the Greek Taekwondo Federation.

== Early life ==
Henk Meijer
Medal record

Representing Netherlands

Men's taekwondo

World Championships
Gold medal – first place	1985 Seoul	+83 kg
Bronze medal – third place	1983 Copenhagen	+83 kg

Meijer was born on 22 July 1959 in Winschoten, Netherlands. He is the fifth out of six children born in his family (he has two brothers and three sisters), and his parents divorced when he was just three years old. His mother took responsibility for raising him. Meijer trained in judo from the ages of 7 to 11, and achieved brown belt rank in that art. From the ages of 11 to 15, he played football. He then trained briefly in Shotokan karate at age of 14 before beginning to practise taekwondo couple of years later. At the time, the only style of taekwondo available in his home region was the International Taekwon-Do Federation (ITF) style.

Meijer began training in ITF taekwondo under Jan Suiveer, and later continued under Wim Bos, one of Suiveer's students. In 1981, he began training in the World Taekwondo Federation (WTF) style of taekwondo. The main reason he moved from the ITF to the WTF was because the latter organisation had gained Olympic recognition. He also expressed dissatisfaction with the poor standard of organisation of ITF competition in the Netherlands at the time.

== Competitive taekwondo career ==
For a few years in the early 1980s, Meijer competed in both ITF and WTF competitions. He was listed at 191 cm (6 ft 3 in) in height and 105 kg (231 lb) in weight. In WTF competition in 1982, he became European Heavyweight Champion, and won both the Dutch National Championships and the Dutch Open Championships. That same year, he trained under Hee Il Cho in Los Angeles for a month. The following year, he competed in the WTF's World Taekwondo Championships in Copenhagen and took third place in his division. He also took charge of the taekwondo school he had been training at from his instructor, Bos. In 1984, he took third place in the men's heavyweight division at the ITF World Championships in Glasgow.

In early September 1985, Meijer competed in the WTF's World Taekwondo Championships in Seoul, South Korea, and won the men's heavyweight (+83 kg) title, becoming the first non-Korean to win a world title in South Korea. In 1988, he took bronze at the European Championships in Ankara and at the World Cup in Helsinki. That same year, he competed at the 1988 Summer Olympics in Seoul, where taekwondo made its first Olympic Games appearance as a demonstration sport; this was the last time he participated as a competitor. Meijer later wrote, "Although I lost my 2nd fight against my big opponent and good friend Michael Arndt from Germany, it was a beautiful finish of my career as a competitor." By the end of his competitive taekwondo career, he had won five Dutch National Championships and five Dutch Open Championships.

== Post-competition career ==
From 1990 to 1994, Meijer coached the Dutch national taekwondo team. In 1994, he was ranked 4th dan in taekwondo, and by 2000, he had reached 5th dan in the art. Meijer was the Dutch taekwondo team's coach for the 2000 Summer Olympics and the 2004 Summer Olympics. By 2006, Meijer was ranked 6th dan, but noted that rank was not particularly important to him. That year, he became Head Coach of the French Taekwondo Federation. Under his guidance, French taekwondo competitors won gold, silver, and bronze at the 2006 European Championships in Bonn.

In 2009, he began coaching in Australia, but soon withdrew from his position due to political problems with sport taekwondo there. On 1 February 2010, Meijer took on the position of Head Coach for the Greek Taekwondo Federation, having made the decision to leave his Australian coaching commitments. Apart from his taekwondo competition experience and rank, he holds a master's degree in sports coaching, which he earned in the Netherlands.

== See also ==
- European Taekwondo Union
- Taekwondo at the 1988 Summer Olympics
- Taekwondo at the Summer Olympics
