= Juan Moreno (taekwondo) =

American taekwondo practitioner and coach

Personal information
- Full name: Juan Miguel Moreno
- Born: April 1, 1971 (age 55) Libertyville, Illinois, U.S.
- Height: 5 ft 10 in (178 cm)
Medal record
Men's taekwondo
Representing the United States
Olympic Games (demonstration)
Silver medal – second place	1988 Seoul	Finweight (–50 kg)
Silver medal – second place	1992 Barcelona	Finweight (–50 kg)
Pan American Games
Gold medal – first place	1991 Havana	50 kg

Juan Miguel Moreno (born April 1, 1971) is an American taekwondo practitioner and coach. He is a three-time Olympian (1988, 1992, 2000) and two-time Olympic silver medalist (1988 and 1992).

After retiring from competition, Moreno served as the National Team Coach in 2002 for the World Cup and 2002, Junior World Championships. Moreno also coached at the 2005 World Taekwondo Championships.
