= Paul Lyons =

Australian taekwondo practitioner (1969–2019)

Personal information
- Nationality: Australian
- Born: 31 March 1969; Dublin, Ireland
- Died: 8 September 2019 (aged 50); Melbourne, Victoria, Australia

Sport
- Sport: Taekwondo

Paul Lyons (31 March 1969 – 8 September 2019) was an Australian taekwondo practitioner. He competed at the 1992 Barcelona Summer Olympics, where taekwondo was a demonstration sport and the 2000 Summer Olympics in Sydney. He was later appointed National Junior Development Coach for taekwondo and was the head coach of a martial arts school in Melbourne. In 2018, he competed on the second season of Australian Ninja Warrior.
