= Tang Hui-ting =

Taiwanese taekwondo practitioner

Personal information
- Nationality: Taiwanese

Sport
- Sport: Taekwondo
Medal record
Representing Chinese Taipei
Women's taekwondo
World Championships
Bronze medal – third place	1987 Barcelona	Welterweight
Asian Championships
Gold medal – first place	1986 Darwin	+60 kg

Tang Hui-ting is a Taiwanese taekwondo practitioner. She won a gold medal at the 1986 Asian Taekwondo Championships. She won a bronze medal in welterweight at the 1987 World Taekwondo Championships.
