= Mayumi Pejo =

American taekwondo practitioner

Mayumi Pejo is a former US Olympian in taekwondo from Binghamton, New York. She achieved a bronze medal, as a 16-year-old, during the 1988 Seoul Olympics.
