= Sharon Jewell =

American taekwondo practitioner

Sharon Ann Jewell (born 9 April 1960 in Little Rock) is a former US Olympian in the sport of taekwondo. She would train at Howard University under Dong Ja Yang. Sharon would earn a bronze medal in the 1988 Seoul Olympics. While there she would meet and date Olympic wrestler, Rodney Smith. After her career she became a taekwondo referee.

Her father, Jerry Jewell (politician), was the first African-American member of the Arkansas State Senate.
