= Kim So-young (taekwondo) =

South Korean taekwondo practitioner

Personal information
- Nationality: South Korean
- Born: 12 June 1966 (age 60)

Sport
- Sport: Taekwondo
Medal record
Women's taekwondo
Representing South Korea
World Championships
Gold medal – first place	1987 Barcelona	Featherweight
Gold medal – first place	1989 Seoul	Featherweight
Asian Championships
Gold medal – first place	1988 Kathmandu	-55 kg

Korean name
- Hangul: 김소영
- Hanja: 金小英
- RR: Gim Soyeong
- MR: Kim Soyŏng

Kim So-young (Korean: 김소영; born 12 June 1966) is a South Korean taekwondo practitioner.

She won a gold medal in featherweight at the 1987 World Taekwondo Championships in Barcelona, and a gold medal in featherweight at the 1989 World Taekwondo Championships in Seoul. She won a gold medal at the 1988 Asian Taekwondo Championships in Kathmandu.
