= Chin Yu-fang =

Taiwanese taekwondo practitioner

Personal information
- Nationality: Taiwanese
- Born: 19 August 1968 (age 57)

Sport
- Sport: Taekwondo
Medal record
Representing Chinese Taipei
Women's taekwondo
World Championships
Gold medal – first place	1989 Seoul	Finweight
Bronze medal – third place	1987 Barcelona	Finweight
Asian Championships
Gold medal – first place	1986 Darwin	-43 kg
Silver medal – second place	1988 Kathmandu	-43 kg

Chin Yu-fang (Chinese: 陳玉鳳; pinyin: Chén Yùfèng; born 19 August 1968) is a Taiwanese taekwondo practitioner.

She won a bronze medal at the 1987 World Taekwondo Championships. She won a gold medal in finweight at the 1989 World Taekwondo Championships in Seoul, after defeating Mónica Torres in the final. She competed at the Asian Taekwondo Championships, winning a gold medal in 1986, and a silver medal in 1988.
