= Brigitte Evanno =

French taekwondo practitioner

Medal record

Representing France

Women's taekwondo

World Championships
Bronze medal – third place	1987 Barcelona	Welterweight

European Championships
Gold medal – first place	1986 Seefeld	Lightweight
Gold medal – first place	1982 Rome	Welterweight
Bronze medal – third place	1984 Stuttgart	Welterweight

Brigitte Evanno (born September 12, 1952 in France) is a French taekwondo athlete.

Evanno won the bronze medal in the under 60 kg at the 1987 World Taekwondo Championships, the gold medal in the under 60 kg taekwondo at the 1986 European Championships, the gold medal in the under 57 kg taekwondo at the 1982 European Championships and the bronze medal in the under 56 kg at the 1984 European Taekwondo Championships.
