= Coral Bistuer =

Spanish taekwondo practitioner

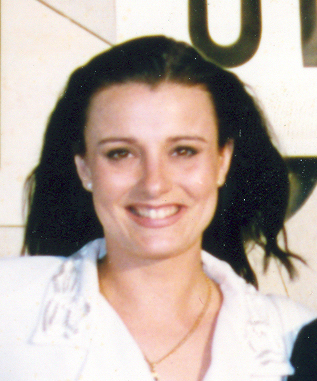
- Coral Bistuer in 1995

Personal information
- Nationality: Spanish
- Born: 16 November 1966 (age 59)

Sport
- Sport: Taekwondo

Achievements and titles
- World finals: 3
Medal record
Representing Spain
Women's taekwondo
World Championships
Gold medal – first place	1987 Barcelona	Welterweight
Silver medal – second place	1991 Athens	Welterweight

Coral Astrid Bistuer Ruiz (born 16 November 1966) is a Spanish taekwondo practitioner.

She won a gold medal in welterweight at the 1987 World Taekwondo Championships in Barcelona. She won a silver medal in welterweight at the 1991 World Taekwondo Championships in Athens. Her achievements at the European Taekwondo Championships include gold medals in 1982, 1986, 1988, 1990 and 1992.

Bistuer went on to teach taekwondo at the SEK International School El Castillo in Madrid. In 2021, she was appointed as general director of sports for the Community of Madrid.
