= Mandy de Jongh =

Dutch taekwondo competitor

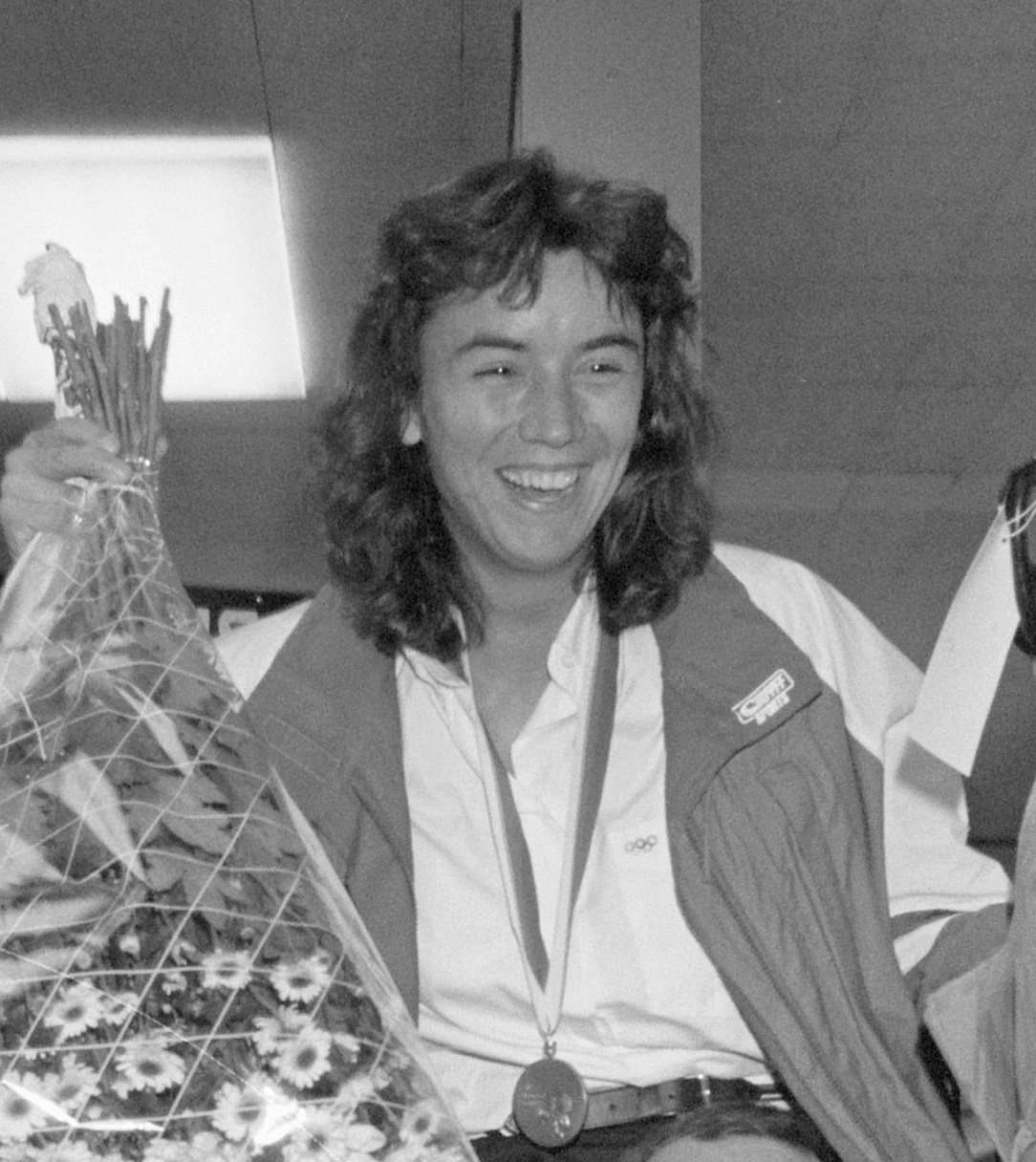
- Mandy de Jongh in 1988
- Born: Margaretha de Jongh; 27 December 1961 (age 64)
- Nationality: Dutch
- Style: Taekwondo

Margaretha "Mandy" de Jongh (born 27 December 1961) is a taekwondo practitioner from the Netherlands. In 1987 she won the World Championships in the middleweight (then −70 kg) category. Next year, she received an unofficial silver medal in the same weight category at the 1988 Summer Olympics (taekwondo was then an exhibition event). She also won two European titles in 1986 and 1988.

Next to taekwondo she was a switchboard operator and receptionist at the Ministry of Education.
