= List of Pan American Games medalists in taekwondo =

This is the complete list of Pan American Games medalists in taekwondo from 1987 to 2015.

== Men's events ==
=== 50 kg ===
Games	Gold	Silver	Bronze
1987	Dae Sung Lee (USA)	Arlindo Gouveia (VEN)	Pascual Pacheco (ECU)
1987	Dae Sung Lee (USA)	Arlindo Gouveia (VEN)	Julio Ramos (ARG)
1991	Juan Moreno (USA)	Amauris Batista (CUB)	César Galvão (BRA)
1991	Juan Moreno (USA)	Amauris Batista (CUB)	José Morales (COL)
1995	Carlos Ayala (MEX)	Luis Pinto (ARG)	Sherland Flores (TRI) Reynaldo Ross (CUB)

=== 54 kg ===
Games	Gold	Silver	Bronze
1987	Carlos Rivas (VEN)	Ricardo Jallath (MEX)	Jerry Torres (PUR)
1987	Carlos Rivas (VEN)	Ricardo Jallath (MEX)	José Vidal (COL)
1991	Arlindo Gouveia (VEN)	Agustín Ayala (MEX)	Luis Flores (PER)
1991	Arlindo Gouveia (VEN)	Agustín Ayala (MEX)	Diego Yáñez (CHI)
1995	Rubén Palafox (MEX)	Samuel Pejo (USA)	Manuel Chamorro (ARG) Alexei Pedroso (CUB)

=== 58 kg ===
Games	Gold	Silver	Bronze
1987	Doug Lewis (USA)	Raymond Mourad (CAN)	Federico Gómez (MEX)
1987	Doug Lewis (USA)	Raymond Mourad (CAN)	Armando Rivera (PUR)
1991	Carlos Rivas (VEN)	Marcial Basanta (CUB)	Flavio Salvador (ARG)
1991	Carlos Rivas (VEN)	Marcial Basanta (CUB)	Rafael Zúñiga (MEX)
1995	Rafael Zúñiga (MEX)	Yosvani Pérez (VEN)	Pedro Carazo (CRC) Fernando Ramírez (ARG)
1999	Óscar Salazar (MEX)	Luis Alberto García (VEN)	Raymond Mourad (CAN) Peter Bardatsos (USA)
2003	Tim Thackrey (USA)	Óscar Salazar (MEX)	Kristian Meléndez (PUR) Gabriel Mercedes (DOM)
2007	Gabriel Mercedes (DOM)	Márcio Wenceslau (BRA)	Frank Díaz (CUB); José Rosal (GUA)
2011	Gabriel Mercedes (DOM)	Damián Villa (MEX)	Frank Diaz (CUB)
2011	Gabriel Mercedes (DOM)	Damián Villa (MEX)	Márcio Wenceslau (BRA)
2015	Carlos Navarro (MEX)	Luisito Pié (DOM)	Lucas Guzmán (ARG)
2015	Carlos Navarro (MEX)	Luisito Pié (DOM)	Harold Avella (COL)

=== 64 kg ===
Games	Gold	Silver	Bronze
1987	Chris Spence (USA)	Gerardo González (VEN)	Eulogio Jara (PAR)
1987	Chris Spence (USA)	Gerardo González (VEN)	Edwin Pagan (PUR)
1991	Roberto Abreu (CUB)	Stephan Goodwin (CAN)	Gerardo González (VEN)
1991	Roberto Abreu (CUB)	Stephan Goodwin (CAN)	Fernando Oviedo (COL)
1995	Alejandro Hernando (ARG)	Clayton Barber (USA)	Agostino dos Santos (CAN) Ivens Valladares (CUB)

=== 68 kg ===
Games	Gold	Silver	Bronze
1999	Steven López (USA)	Luis Benítez (DOM)	Alejandro Hernando (ARG) Yosvani Pérez (CUB)
2003	Luis Benítez (DOM)	Yosvani Pérez (CUB)	Erick Osornio (MEX) Diogo Silva (BRA)
2007	Diogo Silva (BRA)	Peter López (PER)	Danny Miranda (VEN); Yacomo García (DOM)
2011	Jhohanny Jean (DOM)	Angel Mora (CUB)	Terrence Jennings (USA)
2011	Jhohanny Jean (DOM)	Angel Mora (CUB)	Mario Guerra (CHI)
2015	Saúl Gutiérrez (MEX)	Maxime Potvin (CAN)	Miguel Trejos (COL)
2015	Saúl Gutiérrez (MEX)	Maxime Potvin (CAN)	Luis Colon III (PUR)

=== 70 kg ===
Games	Gold	Silver	Bronze
1987	Steve Carpenter (USA)	Juan Rengifo (VEN)	Eddy Olivera (CAN)
1987	Steve Carpenter (USA)	Juan Rengifo (VEN)	Cástulo Valdés (DOM)
1991	Ilse Guilarte (CUB)	William Arencibia (BOL)	Víctor Estrada (MEX)
1991	Ilse Guilarte (CUB)	William Arencibia (BOL)	Michael Popovich (CAN)
1995	Roberto Abreu (CUB)	Quidio Quero (VEN)	Sergio Curdena (CHI) Sébastian Zapata (ARG)

=== 76 kg ===
Games	Gold	Silver	Bronze
1987	Ernesto Rodríguez (MEX)	Alfredo Vitaller (ARG)	Antonio González (PUR)
1987	Ernesto Rodríguez (MEX)	Alfredo Vitaller (ARG)	Jay Warwick (USA)
1991	Jae Hoon Lee (CAN)	James Vilasana (USA)	Juan Noa (CUB)
1991	Jae Hoon Lee (CAN)	James Vilasana (USA)	Marco Prado (GUA)
1995	Arturo Utria (CUB)	Mario Bonilla (GUA)	Regilio Goedhoop (SUR) Stephen Goodwin (CAN)

=== 80 kg ===
Games	Gold	Silver	Bronze
1999	Víctor Estrada (MEX)	Ángel Matos (CUB)	Cristian Peñafiel (ECU) Stewart Gill (USA)
2003	Steven López (USA)	José Luis Ramírez (MEX)	Darío Coria (ARG) Eddy Antonio Luna (DOM)
2007	Ángel Matos (CUB)	James Moontasri (USA)	Chinedum Osuji (TRI); José Luis Ramírez (MEX)
2011	Sebastián Crismanich (ARG)	Carlos Vásquez (VEN)	Uriel Adriano (MEX)
2011	Sebastián Crismanich (ARG)	Carlos Vásquez (VEN)	Stuardo Solorzano (GUA)
2015	Jose Cobas (CUB)	Moisés Hernández (DOM)	Steven López (USA)
2015	Jose Cobas (CUB)	Moisés Hernández (DOM)	René Lizárraga (MEX)

=== +80 kg ===
Games	Gold	Silver	Bronze
1999	Luis Noguera (VEN)	Rodrigo Martínez (MEX)	Danny Vizcaino (DOM) Darrell Henegan (CAN)
2003	Víctor Estrada (MEX)	Rowell Pier Jérez (DOM)	Walassi Aires (BRA) Tudor Sanon (HAI)
2007	Gerardo Ortiz (CUB)	Anthony Graf (USA)	Martín Sío (ARG); Leonardo Gomes (BRA)
2011	Robelis Despaigne (CUB)	Juan Díaz (VEN)	François Coulombe-Fortier (CAN)
2011	Robelis Despaigne (CUB)	Juan Díaz (VEN)	Stephen Lambdin (USA)
2015	Rafael Alba (CUB)	Carlos Rivas (VEN)	Marc-André Bergeron (CAN)
2015	Rafael Alba (CUB)	Carlos Rivas (VEN)	Philip Yun (USA)

=== 83 kg ===
Games	Gold	Silver	Bronze
1987	Herbert Perez (USA)	Ferrère Clerveaux (CAN)	Raguelli Cuevas (ISV)
1987	Herbert Perez (USA)	Ferrère Clerveaux (CAN)	Fernando Jaramillo (ECU)
1991	Fábio Goulart (BRA)	Herbert Perez (USA)	Jorge Kahkajian (VEN)
1991	Fábio Goulart (BRA)	Herbert Perez (USA)	Henry Ramírez (COL)
1995	Víctor Estrada (MEX)	Alfredo Peterson (PAN)	Milton Castro (COL) Anibal Cintron (PUR)

=== +83 kg ===
Games	Gold	Silver	Bronze
1987	Jimmy Kim (USA)	Robert Fellner (ISV)	Gilberto Madeiros (BRA)
1987	Jimmy Kim (USA)	Robert Fellner (ISV)	Julio Vázquez (DOM)
1991	Nelson Sáenz (CUB)	Lucio Fleitas (BRA)	Robert Fellner (ISV)
1991	Nelson Sáenz (CUB)	Lucio Fleitas (BRA)	Ricardo Pupo (ARG)
1995	Nelson Sáenz (CUB)	Lucio Fleitas (BRA)	Paris Amani (USA) Julio Vázquez (DOM)

== Women's events ==
=== 43 kg ===
Games	Gold	Silver	Bronze
1995	Liliana Aguirre (MEX)	Yanet Puerto (CUB)	Yoom Kyung-Chaing (USA) Patricia Santana (ARG)

=== 47 kg ===
Games	Gold	Silver	Bronze
1995	Betsy Ortíz (PUR)	Yunia Cruz (CUB)	Miranda Hall (CAN) Mariela Valenzuela (ARG)

=== 49 kg ===
Games	Gold	Silver	Bronze
1999	Roxane Forget (CAN)	Kay Poe (USA)	Agueda López (MEX) Yanelis Labrada (CUB)
2003	Yanelis Labrada (CUB)	Dalia Contreras (VEN)	Euda Carías (GUA) Carmen Morales (MEX)
2007	Alejandra Gaal (MEX)	Yajaira Peguero (DOM)	Ivett Gonda (CAN); Zoraida Santiago (PUR)
2011	Ivett Gonda (CAN)	Lizbeth Diez-Canseco (PER)	Deireanne Morales (USA)
2011	Ivett Gonda (CAN)	Lizbeth Diez-Canseco (PER)	Jannet Alegría (MEX)
2015	Yania Aguirre (CUB)	Itzel Manjarrez (MEX)	Iris Sing (BRA)
2015	Yania Aguirre (CUB)	Itzel Manjarrez (MEX)	Candelaria Martes (DOM)

=== 51 kg ===
Games	Gold	Silver	Bronze
1995	Eliana Pantoja (VEN)	Roxane Forget (CAN)	Patricia Mariscal (MEX) Cheryl-Ann Sankar (TRI)

=== 55 kg ===
Games	Gold	Silver	Bronze
1995	Oly Padron (VEN)	Alejandra Chancalay (ARG)	Niuris Díaz (CUB) Veronica Márquez (MEX)

=== 57 kg ===
Games	Gold	Silver	Bronze
1999	Noemar Leal (VEN)	Sailin Alvarez (CUB)	Vanina Sánchez (ARG) Gaël Texier (CAN)
2003	Iridia Salazar (MEX)	Dinanyiris Furcal (DOM)	Nia Abdallah (USA) Elizabeth Franco (ECU)
2007	Iridia Salazar (MEX)	Shannon Condie (CAN)	Yaimara Rosario (CUB); Rocio Boudy (ARG)
2011	Irma Contreras (MEX)	Doris Patiño (COL)	Nicole Palma (USA)
2011	Irma Contreras (MEX)	Doris Patiño (COL)	Yeny Contreras (CHI)
2015	Cheyenne Lewis (USA)	Paulina Armeria (MEX)	Doris Patiño (COL)
2015	Cheyenne Lewis (USA)	Paulina Armeria (MEX)	Yamicel Nunez (CUB)

=== 60 kg ===
Games	Gold	Silver	Bronze
1995	Sonallis Mayan (CUB)	Elizabeth Evans (USA)	María Bejarano (COL) Paola Viveros (PAR)

=== 65 kg ===
Games	Gold	Silver	Bronze
1995	Vanina Sánchez (ARG)	Lazara Zayas (CUB)	Ohdra Malpica (VEN) Diana Martin (USA)

=== 67 kg ===
Games	Gold	Silver	Bronze
1999	Heidy Juárez (GUA)	Barbara Pak (USA)	Ineabelle Díaz (PUR) Barbara Kunkel (USA)
2003	Yaneth Leal (VEN)	Vanina Sánchez (ARG)	Simona Hradil (USA) Marien Ramírez (MEX)
2007	Karine Sergerie (CAN)	Heidy Juárez (GUA)	Asunción Ocasio (PUR); Nohemar Lea (VEN)
2011	Melissa Pagnotta (CAN)	Paige McPherson (USA)	Katherine Rodríguez (DOM)
2011	Melissa Pagnotta (CAN)	Paige McPherson (USA)	Taimi Castellanos (CUB)
2015	Paige McPherson (USA)	Victoria Heredia (MEX)	Daima Villalon (CUB)
2015	Paige McPherson (USA)	Victoria Heredia (MEX)	Alexis Arnoldt (ARG)

=== +67 kg ===
Games	Gold	Silver	Bronze
1999	Saray Mayan (CUB)	Adriana Carmona (VEN)	Dominique Bosshart (CAN) Luz Medina (PUR)
2003	Gina María Ruiz (DOM)	Adriana Carmona (VEN)	Patricia Riccautti (ARG) Sanaz Shabazi (USA)
2007	María Espinoza (MEX)	Natália Falavigna (BRA)	Aura Paez (VEN); Mirna Hechavarria (CUB)
2011	Glenhis Hernández (CUB)	Nikki Martínez (PUR)	Guadalupe Ruiz (MEX)
2011	Glenhis Hernández (CUB)	Nikki Martínez (PUR)	Lauren Cahoon (USA)
2015	Jackie Galloway (USA)	María Espinoza (MEX)	Jessica Bravo (COL)
2015	Jackie Galloway (USA)	María Espinoza (MEX)	Raphaella Galacho (BRA)

=== 70 kg ===
Games	Gold	Silver	Bronze
1995	Mónica del Real (MEX)	Natalia Aliajao (ARG)	Ursula Guimet (PER) Marcia King (CAN)

=== +70 kg ===
Games	Gold	Silver	Bronze
1995	Adriana Carmona (VEN)	Robin Humphrey (USA)	Dominique Bosshart (CAN) Yudelki Popo (CUB)
