= Morocco at the 2004 Summer Olympics =

- IOC code: MAR
- NOC: Moroccan Olympic Committee
- Website: www.cnom.org.ma (in French)

in Athens
- Competitors: 55 in 9 sports
- Flag bearer: Nezha Bidouane
- Medals Ranked 36th: Gold 2 Silver 1 Bronze 0 Total 3

Summer Olympics appearances (overview)
- 1960; 1964; 1968; 1972; 1976; 1980; 1984; 1988; 1992; 1996; 2000; 2004; 2008; 2012; 2016; 2020; 2024

Morocco competed at the 2004 Summer Olympics in Athens, Greece, from 13 to 29 August 2004. This was the nation's eleventh appearance at the Olympics, except the 1980 Summer Olympics in Moscow, because of its partial support to the United States boycott.

Comité Olympique Marocain sent a total of 55 athletes, 47 men and 8 women, to compete in 9 sports. Men's football was the only team-based sport in which Morocco had its representation at these Olympic Games. There was only a single competitor in fencing, swimming, and weightlifting. The Moroccan team featured four Olympic medalists from Sydney: boxer Tahar Tamsamani, steeplechaser Ali Ezzine, middle-distance runner and top favorite Hicham El Guerrouj, and hurdler and former world champion Nezha Bidouane, who later became the nation's first ever female flag bearer in the opening ceremony.

Morocco left Athens with a total of three Olympic medals (two gold and one silver), being considered the most successful Olympics based on the gold medal count. As one of the major highlights of these Games, Hicham El Guerrouj set an Olympic historical milestone as the first ever Moroccan athlete to strike a distance double (1500–5000) since Paavo Nurmi did so in 1924, and the first to claim a gold since the 1992 Summer Olympics in Barcelona, where Khalid Skah won the men's 10,000 metres title. On August 29, 2004, at the time of the closing ceremony, El Guerrouj was elected to the IOC Athletes' Commission, along with three other athletes. Meanwhile, the silver medal was awarded to fellow middle-distance runner Hasna Benhassi in the women's 800 metres.

== Medalists ==
| Medal | Name | Sport | Event | Date |
|---|---|---|---|---|
| Gold | Hicham El Guerrouj | Athletics | Men's 1500 m | August 24 |
| Gold | Hicham El Guerrouj | Athletics | Men's 5000 m | August 28 |
| Silver | Hasna Benhassi | Athletics | Women's 800 m | August 23 |

== Athletics ==
Moroccan athletes have so far achieved qualifying standards in the following athletics events (up to a maximum of 3 athletes in each event at the 'A' Standard, and 1 at the 'B' Standard).

Key

- Note–Ranks given for track events are within the athlete's heat only
- Q = Qualified for the next round
- q = Qualified for the next round as a fastest loser or, in field events, by position without achieving the qualifying target
- NR = National record
- N/A = Round not applicable for the event
- Bye = Athlete not required to compete in round

Men
Track & road events

| Athlete | Event | Heat | | Semifinal | | Final | |
| Athlete | Event | Result | Rank | Result | Rank | Result | Rank |
|---|---|---|---|---|---|---|---|
| Mohammed Amyne | 10000 m | — | | | | 28:55.96 | 18 |
| Youssef Baba | 1500 m | 3:38.71 | 7 q | 3:42.96 | 10 | Did not advance | |
| Hicham Bellani | 5000 m | 13:22.64 | 6 q | — | | 13:31.81 | 9 |
| Mouhssin Chehibi | 800 m | 1:46.77 | 2 Q | 1:44.62 | 3 q | 1:45.16 | 4 |
| Abdelatif Chemlal | 3000 m steeplechase | 8:29.36 | 9 | — | | Did not advance | |
| Khalid El Boumlili | Marathon | — | | | | DNF | |
| Hicham El Guerrouj | 1500 m | 3:37.86 | 1 Q | 3:40.87 | 1 Q | 3:34.18 | 1st place, gold medalist(s) |
| Hicham El Guerrouj | 5000 m | 13:21.87 | 3 Q | — | | 13:14.39 | 1st place, gold medalist(s) |
| Ali Ezzine | 3000 m steeplechase | 8:20.18 | 5 q | — | | 8:15.58 | 8 |
| Rachid Ghanmouni | Marathon | — | | | | DNF | |
| Jaouad Gharib | Marathon | — | | | | 2:15:12 | 11 |
| Abderrahim Goumri | 5000 m | 13:20.03 | 5 Q | — | | 13:47.27 | 13 |
| Adil Kaouch | 1500 m | 3:39.88 | 4 Q | 3:35.69 | 1 Q | 3:38.26 | 9 |
| Amine Laalou | 800 m | 1:45.88 | 1 Q | 1:47.53 | 7 | Did not advance | |
| Zouhair Ouerdi | 3000 m steeplechase | 8:27.55 | 4 | — | | Did not advance | |

Field events

| Athlete | Event | Qualification | | Final | |
| Athlete | Event | Distance | Position | Distance | Position |
|---|---|---|---|---|---|
| Yahya Berrabah | Long jump | 7.62 | 30 | Did not advance | |
| Tarik Bouguetaïb | Long jump | 7.79 | 24 | Did not advance | |

Women
Track & road events

| Athlete | Event | Heat | | Semifinal | | Final | |
| Athlete | Event | Result | Rank | Result | Rank | Result | Rank |
|---|---|---|---|---|---|---|---|
| Amina Aït Hammou | 800 m | 2:03.70 | 2 Q | 2:00.66 | 7 | Did not advance | |
| Seltana Aït Hammou | 800 m | 2:03.95 | 2 Q | 2:00.64 | 6 | Did not advance | |
| Hasna Benhassi | 800 m | 2:01.20 | 1 Q | 1:58.59 | 1 Q | 1:56.43 NR | 2nd place, silver medalist(s) |
| Hasna Benhassi | 1500 m | 4:05.98 | 5 q | 4:07.39 | 5 q | 4:12.90 | 12 |
| Nezha Bidouane | 400 m hurdles | 55.69 | 3 | Did not advance | | | |
| Bouchra Ghezielle | 1500 m | DNS | | Did not advance | | | |
| Hafida Izem | Marathon | — | | | | 2:40:46 | 27 |
| Kenza Wahbi | Marathon | — | | | | 2:41:36 | 30 |

== Boxing ==
Morocco sent seven boxers to Athens. Only two of them won their first bouts, including Sydney bronze medalist Tahar Tamsamani, and both were defeated in the second round to give the team a combined record of 2–7.

| Athlete | Event | Round of 32 | Round of 16 | Quarterfinals | Semifinals | Final | |
| Athlete | Event | Opposition Result | Opposition Result | Opposition Result | Opposition Result | Opposition Result | Rank |
|---|---|---|---|---|---|---|---|
| Redouane Bouchtouk | Light flyweight | Tamara (COL); L 25–48 | Did not advance | | | | |
| Hicham Mesbahi | Flyweight | Luza (BOT); W 25–20 | Rżany (POL); L 20–33 | Did not advance | | | |
| Hamid Ait Bighrade | Bantamweight | Prasad (IND); L 17–25 | Did not advance | | | | |
| Tahar Tamsamani | Lightweight | Rukundo (UGA); L 22–30 | Did not advance | | | | |
| Nafil Hicham | Light welterweight | Mosquea (DOM); W 42–40 | Karimzhanov (KAZ); L 13–33 | Did not advance | | | |
| Ait Hammi Miloud | Welterweight | Saitov (RUS); L 15–30 | Did not advance | | | | |
| Rachid El Haddak | Heavyweight | — | Vargas (USA); L RSC | Did not advance | | | |

== Fencing ==
One Moroccan fencer qualified for the following events:

Men

| Athlete | Event | Round of 64 | Round of 32 | Round of 16 | Quarterfinal | Semifinal | Final / BM | |
| Athlete | Event | Opposition Score | Opposition Score | Opposition Score | Opposition Score | Opposition Score | Opposition Score | Rank |
|---|---|---|---|---|---|---|---|---|
| Aissam Rami | Individual épée | Kochetkov (RUS); L 6–15 | Did not advance | | | | | |

== Football ==
The Morocco national football team qualified for the Olympics after getting a go-ahead penalty goal in their final qualifying match against Angola.

=== Men's tournament ===
Roster

The following is the Moroccan squad in the men's football tournament of the 2004 Summer Olympics.

Head coach: Mustapha Madih

| No. | Pos. | Player | Date of birth (age) | Caps | Goals | 2004 club |
|---|---|---|---|---|---|---|
| 1 | GK | Omar Charef | 19 February 1981 (aged 23) | 24 | 0 | (Royal Moroccan Football Federation) Mouloudia Club d'Oujda |
| 2 | DF | Moncef Zerka | 30 August 1981 (aged 22) | 10 | 0 | (French Football Federation) Nancy |
| 3 | MF | Salaheddine Aqqal | 1 January 1984 (aged 20) | 18 | 1 | (Royal Moroccan Football Federation) Khourigba |
| 4 | DF | Jamal Alioui | 2 June 1982 (aged 22) | 11 | 1 | (Italian Football Federation) Perugia |
| 5 | MF | Merouane Zemmama | 7 October 1983 (aged 20) | 12 | 9 | (Royal Moroccan Football Federation) Raja Casablanca |
| 6 | DF | Badr El Kaddouri | 31 January 1981 (aged 23) | 19 | 0 | (Ukrainian Association of Football) Dynamo Kyiv |
| 7 | FW | Farid Talhaoui | 10 February 1982 (aged 22) | 4 | 0 | (French Football Federation) Guingamp |
| 8 | MF | Yazid Kaissi | 16 May 1981 (aged 23) | 9 | 3 | (French Football Federation) Lens |
| 9 | FW | Mustapha Allaoui | 30 May 1983 (aged 21) | 21 | 12 | (Royal Moroccan Football Federation) MAS Fes |
| 10 | FW | Bouabid Bouden | 1 February 1982 (aged 22) | 28 | 15 | (French Football Federation) Lens |
| 11 | FW | Mehdi Taouil | 20 May 1983 (aged 21) | 6 | 2 | (German Football Association) Nürnberg |
| 12 | FW | Bouchaib El Moubarki* | 12 January 1978 (aged 26) | 20 | 0 | (United Arab Emirates Football Association) Al Wasl FC |
| 13 | DF | Oussama Souaidy | 25 August 1981 (aged 22) | 18 | 7 | (Royal Spanish Football Federation) Mallorca |
| 14 | MF | Azzeddine Ourahou | 12 August 1984 (aged 20) | 4 | 0 | (French Football Federation) Istres |
| 15 | DF | Tajeddine Sami | 10 June 1982 (aged 22) | 18 | 2 | (Royal Moroccan Football Federation) Raja Casablanca |
| 16 | DF | Elamine Erbate | 1 January 1981 (aged 23) | 31 | 5 | (Royal Moroccan Football Federation) Raja Casablanca |
| 17 | MF | Otmane El Assas* | 30 January 1979 (aged 25) | 35 | 8 | (Qatar Football Association) Al Ittihad |
| 18 | GK | Nadir Lamyaghri* | 13 February 1976 (aged 28) | 30 | 13 | (Royal Moroccan Football Federation) Wydad Athletic Club |

* Over-aged player.

Group play

| Pos | Team | Pld | W | D | L | GF | GA | GD | Pts | Qualification |
|---|---|---|---|---|---|---|---|---|---|---|
| 1 | Iraq | 3 | 2 | 0 | 1 | 7 | 4 | +3 | 6 | Qualified for the quarterfinals |
| 2 | Costa Rica | 3 | 1 | 1 | 1 | 4 | 4 | 0 | 4 | Qualified for the quarterfinals |
| 3 | Morocco | 3 | 1 | 1 | 1 | 3 | 3 | 0 | 4 | |
| 4 | Portugal | 3 | 1 | 0 | 2 | 6 | 9 | −3 | 3 | |

12 August 2004
20:30

| Costa Rica | 0 – 0 | Morocco |
|---|---|---|
| | Report |

Pankritio Stadium, Heraklion
Attendance: 3,212
Referee: Massimo De Santis (Italy)

15 August 2004
20:30

| Morocco | 1 – 2 | Portugal |
|---|---|---|
| Bouden 85' | Report | Ronaldo 40'; R. Costa 73' |

Pankritio Stadium, Heraklion
Attendance: 7,581
Referee: Carlos Batres (Guatemala)

18 August 2004
20:30

| Morocco | 2 – 1 | Iraq |
|---|---|---|
| Bouden 69' (pen.); Aqqal 77' | Report | Sadir 63' |

Pampeloponnisiako Stadium, Patras
Attendance: 4,019
Referee: Horacio Elizondo (Argentina)

== Judo ==
Two Moroccan judoka qualified for the 2004 Summer Olympics.

| Athlete | Event | Round of 32 | Round of 16 | Quarterfinals | Semifinals | Repechage 1 | Repechage 2 | Repechage 3 | Final / BM | |
| Athlete | Event | Opposition Result | Opposition Result | Opposition Result | Opposition Result | Opposition Result | Opposition Result | Opposition Result | Opposition Result | Rank |
|---|---|---|---|---|---|---|---|---|---|---|
| Younes Ahamdi | Men's −60 kg | Stanev (RUS); L 0000–1000 | Did not advance | | | | | | | |
| Adil Belgaid | Men's −81 kg | Hontyuk (UKR); L 0000–1020 | Did not advance | | | Chahkhandagh (IRI); W 0013–0001 | Wanner (GER); L 0000–0201 | Did not advance | | |

== Swimming ==
Men

| Athlete | Event | Heat | | Semifinal | | Final | |
| Athlete | Event | Time | Rank | Time | Rank | Time | Rank |
|---|---|---|---|---|---|---|---|
| Adil Bellaz | 200 m freestyle | 1:55.79 | 53 | Did not advance | | | |

== Taekwondo ==
Three Moroccan taekwondo jin qualified for the following events.

| Athlete | Event | Round of 16 | Quarterfinals | Semifinals | Repechage 1 | Repechage 2 | Final / BM | |
| Athlete | Event | Opposition Result | Opposition Result | Opposition Result | Opposition Result | Opposition Result | Opposition Result | Rank |
|---|---|---|---|---|---|---|---|---|
| Abdelkader Zrouri | Men's +80 kg | Noguera (VEN); W 8–5 | Nikolaidis (GRE); L 2–5 | Did not advance | Rojas (COL); W 6–2 | Gentil (FRA); L 1–3 | Did not advance | 5 |
| Mouna Benabderassoul | Women's −67 kg | Nahdi (TUN); W 6–2 | Díaz (PUR); L 4–4 SUP | Did not advance | | | | |
| Mounia Bourguigue | Women's +67 kg | Castrignano (ITA); L 4–6 | Did not advance | | | | | |

== Tennis ==
Morocco nominated two male tennis players to compete in the tournament.

| Athlete | Event | Round of 64 | Round of 32 | Round of 16 | Quarterfinals | Semifinals | Final / BM | |
| Athlete | Event | Opposition Score | Opposition Score | Opposition Score | Opposition Score | Opposition Score | Opposition Score | Rank |
|---|---|---|---|---|---|---|---|---|
| Hicham Arazi | Men's singles | Ferrero (ESP); L 3–6, 1–6 | Did not advance | | | | | |
| Younes El Aynaoui | Men's singles | Hrbatý (SVK); L 3–6, 4–6 | Did not advance | | | | | |
| Hicham Arazi; Younes El Aynaoui | Men's doubles | — | Mirnyi / Voltchkov (BLR); L RET | Did not advance | | | | |

== Weightlifting ==
One Moroccan weightlifter qualified for the following events:

| Athlete | Event | Snatch | | Clean & Jerk | | Total | Rank |
| Athlete | Event | Result | Rank | Result | Rank | Total | Rank |
|---|---|---|---|---|---|---|---|
| Yacine Zouaki | Men's −62 kg | 95 | 18 | 130 | 16 | 225 | 15 |

== See also ==
- Morocco at the 2004 Summer Paralympics
- Morocco at the 2005 Mediterranean Games
