= Puerto Rico at the 2004 Summer Olympics =

- IOC code: PUR
- NOC: Puerto Rico Olympic Committee
- Website: www.copur.pr (in Spanish)

in Athens
- Competitors: 43 in 15 sports
- Flag bearer: Carlos Arroyo
- Medals: Gold 0 Silver 0 Bronze 0 Total 0

Summer Olympics appearances (overview)
- 1948; 1952; 1956; 1960; 1964; 1968; 1972; 1976; 1980; 1984; 1988; 1992; 1996; 2000; 2004; 2008; 2012; 2016; 2020; 2024; 2028

Puerto Rico competed at the 2004 Summer Olympics in Athens, Greece, from 13 to 29 August 2004. This was the nation's fifteenth consecutive appearance at the Olympics.

Puerto Rico Olympic Committee sent the nation's largest delegation to the Games since 1992 due to the presence of the men's basketball team. A total of 43 athletes, 32 men and 11 women, had competed in 15 sports, roughly larger by two thirds of the nation's team size from the previous Games. Five Puerto Rican athletes had previously competed in Sydney, including four-time Olympian and Tornado sailor Enrique Figueroa and freestyle swimmer and two-time Olympic finalist Ricardo Busquets. Men's basketball was the only team-based sport in which Puerto Rico had its representation at these Games. Because of the nation's emerging presence to the team sport, team captain and NBA's Utah Jazz player Carlos Arroyo was appointed by the committee to carry the Puerto Rican flag in the opening ceremony. Puerto Rico also marked its Olympic debut in synchronized swimming and taekwondo.

Puerto Rico left Athens without receiving a single Olympic medal for the second consecutive time. Figueroa and his new partner Jorge Hernández achieved the nation's highest placement at these Games after finishing seventh in the Tornado class. Meanwhile, Mabel Fonseca originally claimed the fifth position in women's wrestling, but she committed an anti-doping violation, as she was tested positive for the steroid stanozolol. Despite not winning a medal, the men's basketball team secured a notable victory against the United States. The Puerto Ricans' convincing 92-73 win against the three-time defending gold medalists was the United States team's first Olympic loss since it began including NBA players in 1992, only its third Olympic loss overall, and as of 2021, its most lopsided Olympic loss ever.

== Athletics ==
Puerto Rican athletes have so far achieved qualifying standards in the following athletics events (up to a maximum of 3 athletes in each event at the 'A' Standard, and 1 at the 'B' Standard).

Key

- Note–Ranks given for track events are within the athlete's heat only
- Q = Qualified for the next round
- q = Qualified for the next round as a fastest loser or, in field events, by position without achieving the qualifying target
- NR = National record
- N/A = Round not applicable for the event
- Bye = Athlete not required to compete in round

Men
Track & road events

Athlete	Event	Heat		Final	
Athlete	Event	Result	Rank	Result	Rank
Alexander Greaux	3000 m steeplechase	8:33.62	9	Did not advance	

Combined events – Decathlon

Athlete	Event	100 m	LJ	SP	HJ	400 m	110H	DT	PV	JT	1500 m	Final	Rank
Luiggy Llanos	Result	10.94	7.43	13.77	1.91	49.28	14.13	41.82	NM	DNS	—	DNF	
Luiggy Llanos	Points	874	918	714	723	848	958	702	0	0	—	DNF	

Women
Track & road events

Athlete	Event	Heat		Semifinal		Final	
Athlete	Event	Result	Rank	Result	Rank	Result	Rank
Yvonne Harrison	400 m hurdles	55.84	5	Did not advance			

== Basketball ==
=== Men's tournament ===
Roster

The following is the Puerto Rico roster in the men's basketball tournament of the 2004 Summer Olympics.

Puerto Rico men's national basketball team – 2004 Summer Olympics roster
Players
Coaches

Pos.	No.	Name	Age – Date of birth	Height	Club	Ctr.
C	4	José Ortiz (C)	40 – 23 October 1963	2.11 m (6 ft 11 in)	Cangrejeros de Santurce	(Puerto Rico)
G/F	5	Eddie Casiano	31 – 20 September 1972	1.92 m (6 ft 4 in)	Leones de Ponce	(Puerto Rico)
G	6	Roberto Hatton	27 – 11 October 1976	1.88 m (6 ft 2 in)	Leones de Ponce	(Puerto Rico)
G	7	Carlos Arroyo	25 – 30 July 1979	1.85 m (6 ft 1 in)	Utah Jazz	(United States)
G/F	8	Rick Apodaca	24 – 1 July 1980	1.95 m (6 ft 5 in)	Huntsville Flight	(United States)
G	9	Christian Dalmau	28 – 29 August 1975	1.92 m (6 ft 4 in)	Atléticos de San Germán	(Puerto Rico)
G	10	Elias Ayuso	27 – 27 March 1977	1.92 m (6 ft 4 in)	Beşiktaş	(Turkey)
C	11	Peter John Ramos	19 – 23 May 1985	2.19 m (7 ft 2 in)	Criollos de Caguas	(Puerto Rico)
F	12	Rolando Hourruitiner	29 – 28 May 1975	2.04 m (6 ft 8 in)	Cangrejeros de Santurce	(Puerto Rico)
F	13	Sharif Fajardo	28 – 9 June 1976	2.10 m (6 ft 11 in)	Acegas Trieste	(Italy)
F	14	Jorge Rivera	30 – 9 December 1973	2.01 m (6 ft 7 in)	Vaqueros de Bayamón	(Puerto Rico)
C	15	Daniel Santiago	28 – 24 June 1976	2.13 m (7 ft 0 in)	Milwaukee Bucks	(United States)

Head coach

- (Puerto Rico) Julio Toro

Assistant coach(es)

- (Puerto Rico) Flor Meléndez
- (Puerto Rico) Manolo Cintron

Legend

- (C) Team captain
- nat field describes country
  of last club
  before the tournament
- Age as of August 13, 2004

Group play

Pos	Team	Pld	W	L	PF	PA	PD	Pts	Qualification
1	Lithuania	5	5	0	468	414	+54	10	Quarterfinals
2	Greece	5	3	2	389	343	+46	8 (Note: Head-to-head record: Greece 1–1 (1.10 GAvg), Puerto Rico 1–1 (0.99), United States 1–1 (0.92))	Quarterfinals
3	Puerto Rico	5	3	2	410	411	−1	8	Quarterfinals
4	United States	5	3	2	418	389	+29	8	Quarterfinals
5	Australia	5	1	4	383	411	−28	6	9th place playoff
6	Angola	5	0	5	321	421	−100	5	11th place playoff

Source: FIBA archive
Rules for classification: 1) points; 2) head-to-head points; 3) head-to-head goal average; 4) head-to-head number of points scored.
Notes:

15 August 2004
20:00

Boxscore

Puerto Rico	92–73	United States
Scoring by quarter: 21–20, 28–7, 16–21, 27–25
Pts: Arroyo 24; Rebs: Ortiz 6 Asts: Arroyo 7		Pts: Duncan, Iverson 15 each Rebs: Duncan 16; Asts: Duncan 4

Helliniko Indoor Arena, Athens
Attendance: 11,560
Referees:
Zoran Šutulović (Serbia and Montenegro)
Vicente Bulto (Spain)

17 August 2004
14:30

Lithuania	98–90	Puerto Rico
Scoring by quarter: 26–32, 23–12, 22–22, 27–24
Pts: Šiškauskas 23; Rebs: E. Žukauskas 8 Asts: Jasikevičius 7		Pts: Arroyo, Ayuso 25 each Rebs: Hourruitiner 6 Asts: Arroyo, Ayuso 2 each

Helliniko Indoor Arena, Athens
Attendance: 12,500
Referees:
Pablo Estevez (Argentina)
Zoran Šutulović (Serbia and Montenegro)

19 August 2004
16:45

Puerto Rico	83–80	Angola
Scoring by quarter: 19–17, 18–15, 26–34, 20–14
Pts: Ayuso 17; Rebs: Santiago 10; Asts: Arroyo 6		Pts: de Carvalho 14; Rebs: Moussa 6 Asts: Costa 7

Helliniko Indoor Arena, Athens
Attendance: 12,000
Referees: Reynaldo Sanchez (DOM), Ma Li Jun (CHN)

21 August 2004
9:00

Australia	82–87	Puerto Rico
Scoring by quarter: 23–13, 28–28, 17–24, 14–22
Pts: Nielsen 20; Rebs: Bogut 11; Asts: Heal 6		Pts: Santiago 20; Rebs: Ortiz 6 Asts: Arroyo 7

Helliniko Indoor Arena, Athens
Attendance: 6,500
Referees: Vicente Bulto (ESP), Pablo Estevez (ARG)

23 August 2004
22:15

Greece	78–58	Puerto Rico
Scoring by quarter: 20–22, 20–6, 16–18, 22–12
Pts: Kakiouzis 16; Rebs: Dikoudis 8 Asts: Papaloukas 4		Pts: Ayuso 11; Rebs: Fajardo 9 Asts: Arroyo 4

Helliniko Indoor Arena, Athens
Attendance: 12,000
Referees:
José Ronfini (Mexico)
Scott Buttler (Australia)

Quarterfinals

26 August 2004
20:00

Italy	83–70	Puerto Rico
Scoring by quarter: 23–20, 18–15, 19–17, 23–18
Pts: Bulleri 20; Rebs: Marconato 12; Asts: Pozzecco 6		Pts: Ayuso 24; Rebs: Ortiz 8 Asts: Arroyo 5

Olympic Indoor Hall, Athens
Attendance: 14,500
Referees:
Vicente Bulto (Spain)
Alejandro Chiti (Argentina)

Classification match (5th–6th place)

28 August 2004
11:15

5th place

Puerto Rico	75–85	Greece
Scoring by quarter: 15–25, 21–19, 20–22, 19–19
Pts: Ayuso 14; Rebs: Santiago 9 Asts: Arroyo 4		Pts: Kakiouzis 20; Rebs: Diamantidis 8 Asts: 3 players, 3 each

Olympic Indoor Hall, Athens
Attendance: 14,500
Referees:
Mike Homsy (Canada)
Michael Aylen (Australia)

== Boxing ==
Puerto Rico sent five boxers to Athens.

Athlete	Event	Round of 32	Round of 16	Quarterfinals	Semifinals	Final	
Athlete	Event	Opposition Result	Opposition Result	Opposition Result	Opposition Result	Opposition Result	Rank
Joseph Serrano	Flyweight	Rakhimzhanov (KAZ); L 23–42	Did not advance				
Juan Manuel López	Bantamweight	Khatsigov (BLR); L 19–27	Did not advance				
Carlos Velasquez	Featherweight	Oliveira (BRA); L 43–43^{+}	Did not advance				
Alex de Jesús	Lightweight	Carvalho (BRA); W 39–24	Rukundo (UGA); L 22–24	Did not advance			
Victor Bisbal	Super heavyweight	—N/a	Jakšto (LTU); L 17–26	Did not advance			

Christian Rosario

== Diving ==
Women

Athlete	Event	Preliminaries		Semifinals		Final	
Athlete	Event	Points	Rank	Points	Rank	Points	Rank
Angelique Rodríguez	3 m springboard	239.19	25	Did not advance			
Angelique Rodríguez	10 m platform	316.08	11 Q	455.94	18	Did not advance	

== Equestrian ==
=== Show jumping ===
Athlete	Horse	Event	Qualification								Final					Total	
Athlete	Horse	Event	Round 1		Round 2			Round 3			Round A		Round B			Total	
Athlete	Horse	Event	Penalties	Rank	Penalties	Total	Rank	Penalties	Total	Rank	Penalties	Rank	Penalties	Total	Rank	Penalties	Rank
Mark Watring	Sapphire	Individual	25	73	39	64	68 Q	Retired			Did not advance						

== Gymnastics ==
=== Artistic ===
Men

Athlete	Event	Qualification								Final							
Athlete	Event	Apparatus						Total	Rank	Apparatus						Total	Rank
Athlete	Event	F	PH	R	V	PB	HB	Total	Rank	F	PH	R	V	PB	HB	Total	Rank
Luis Vargas	All-around	9.037	9.675	9.500	9.425	9.325	9.625	56.587	16 Q	8.337	9.612	9.500	9.462	9.562	9.662	56.135	15

== Judo ==
Three Puerto Rican judoka (two men and one woman) qualified for the 2004 Summer Olympics.

Athlete	Event	Round of 32	Round of 16	Quarterfinals	Semifinals	Repechage 1	Repechage 2	Repechage 3	Final / BM	
Athlete	Event	Opposition Result	Opposition Result	Opposition Result	Opposition Result	Opposition Result	Opposition Result	Opposition Result	Opposition Result	Rank
Melvin Méndez	Men's −66 kg	Peñas (ESP); L 0000–1000	Did not advance							
Ramón Ayala	Men's −100 kg	Belgroun (ALG); L 0000–1010	Did not advance							
Jessica García	Women's −57 kg	Bye	Bönisch (GER); L 0011–0121	Did not advance		Fernández (ESP); L 0000–1011	Did not advance			

== Sailing ==
Puerto Rican sailors have qualified one boat for each of the following events.

Women

Athlete	Event	Race											Net points	Final rank
Athlete	Event	1	2	3	4	5	6	7	8	9	10	M*	Net points	Final rank
Karla Barrera	Mistral	~~26~~	24	25	26	23	25	26	26	26	25	24	250	26

Open

Athlete	Event	Race											Net points	Final rank
Athlete	Event	1	2	3	4	5	6	7	8	9	10	M*	Net points	Final rank
Enrique Figueroa; Jorge Hernández	Tornado	9	7	12	11	1	2	3	4	12	1	~~14~~	72	7

M = Medal race; OCS = On course side of the starting line; DSQ = Disqualified; DNF = Did not finish; DNS= Did not start; RDG = Redress given

== Shooting ==
Men

Athlete	Event	Qualification		Final	
Athlete	Event	Points	Rank	Points	Rank
Lucas Rafael Bennazar Ortiz	Trap	112	=27	Did not advance	
Lucas Rafael Bennazar Ortiz	Double trap	122	23	Did not advance	

== Swimming ==
Puerto Rican swimmers earned qualifying standards in the following events (up to a maximum of 2 swimmers in each event at the A-standard time, and 1 at the B-standard time):

Men

Athlete	Event	Heat		Semifinal		Final	
Athlete	Event	Time	Rank	Time	Rank	Time	Rank
Ricardo Busquets	50 m freestyle	22.45	12 Q	22.52	15	Did not advance	
Andrew Livingston	200 m butterfly	1:59.42	=21	Did not advance			
Arsenio López	100 m breaststroke	1:03.99	=36	Did not advance			
Jorge Oliver	200 m individual medley	2:08.84	=45	Did not advance			

Women

Athlete	Event	Heat		Semifinal		Final	
Athlete	Event	Time	Rank	Time	Rank	Time	Rank
Vanessa García	50 m freestyle	26.26	=28	Did not advance			
Vanessa García	100 m freestyle	57.38	35	Did not advance			
Gretchen Gotay Cordero	200 m backstroke	2:23.39	31	Did not advance			

== Synchronized swimming ==
Two Puerto Rican synchronized swimmers qualified a spot in the women's duet.

Athlete	Event	Technical routine		Free routine (preliminary)			Free routine (final)		
Athlete	Event	Points	Rank	Points	Total (technical + free)	Rank	Points	Total (technical + free)	Rank
Luña del Mar Aguiliú; Leilani Torres	Duet	39.667	23	39.917	79.584	23	Did not advance		

== Taekwondo ==
Puerto Rico has qualified a single taekwondo jin.

Athlete	Event	Round of 16	Quarterfinals	Semifinals	Repechage 1	Repechage 2	Final / BM	
Athlete	Event	Opposition Result	Opposition Result	Opposition Result	Opposition Result	Opposition Result	Opposition Result	Rank
Ineabelle Díaz	Women's −67 kg	Bye	Benabderassoul (MAR); W 4–4 SUP	Luo W (CHN); L 3–5	Bye	Juárez (GUA); L 2–5	Did not advance	5

== Tennis ==
Puerto Rico nominated a female tennis player to compete in the tournament.

Athlete	Event	Round of 64	Round of 32	Round of 16	Quarterfinals	Semifinals	Final / BM	
Athlete	Event	Opposition Score	Opposition Score	Opposition Score	Opposition Score	Opposition Score	Opposition Score	Rank
Kristina Brandi	Women's singles	Kostanić (CRO); W 7–5, 6–1	Myskina (RUS); L 2–6, 6–3, 4–6	Did not advance				

== Volleyball ==
=== Beach ===
Athlete	Event	Preliminary round	Standing	Round of 16	Quarterfinals	Semifinals	Final	
Athlete	Event	Opposition Score	Standing	Opposition Score	Opposition Score	Opposition Score	Opposition Score	Rank
Ramón Hernández; Raúl Papaleo	Men's	Pool D Dieckmann – Reckermann (GER); L 0 – 2 (14–21, 13–21); Høidalen – Kjemperud (NOR); L 1 – 2 (21–18, 19–21, 10–15); Berg – Dahl (SWE); L 1 – 2 (21–19, 16–21, 16–18)	4	Did not advance				

== Wrestling ==
Key:

- VT - Victory by Fall.
- PP - Decision by Points - the loser with technical points.
- PO - Decision by Points - the loser without technical points.

Women's freestyle

Athlete	Event	Elimination Pool			Classification	Semifinal	Final / BM	
Athlete	Event	Opposition Result	Opposition Result	Rank	Opposition Result	Opposition Result	Opposition Result	Rank
Mabel Fonseca	−55 kg	Lazareva (UKR); W 5–0 ^{VT}	Karlsson (SWE); L 0–5 ^{VT}	2	O'Donnell (USA); W 3–1 ^{PP}	Bye	Sun Dm (CHN); W 3–1 ^{PP}	DSQ

== See also ==
- Puerto Rico at the 2003 Pan American Games
- Puerto Rico at the 2004 Summer Paralympics
