= Taekwondo at the 2000 Summer Olympics – Women's +67 kg =

Taekwondo competition

Women's +67 kg at the Games of the XXVII Olympiad
- Venue: State Sports Centre
- Date: 30 September
- Competitors: 12 from 12 nations

Medalists
1st place, gold medalist(s)		Chen Zhong	China
2nd place, silver medalist(s)		Natalia Ivanova	Russia
3rd place, bronze medalist(s)		Dominique Bosshart	Canada

The women's +67 kg competition in taekwondo at the 2000 Summer Olympics in Sydney took place on September 30 at the State Sports Centre.

Chinese taekwondo jin Chen Zhong steadily piled up points to edge 29-year-old Russian veteran Natalia Ivanova 8–3 for the gold medal in the women's heavyweight class. Meanwhile, lone Canadian fighter Dominique Bosshart mounted a six-point onslaught in the third round to kick out and overwhelm 1999 European Champion Nataša Vezmar of Croatia for the bronze medal, delivering a marvelous 11–8 record.

== Competition format ==
The main bracket consisted of a single elimination tournament, culminating in the gold medal match. The taekwondo fighters eliminated in earlier rounds by the two finalists of the main bracket advanced directly to the repechage tournament. These matches determined the bronze medal winner for the event.

== Schedule ==
All times are Greece Standard Time (UTC+2)

Date	Time	Round
Saturday, 30 September 2000	09:00; 11:30; 15:30; 20:30	Preliminary Round; Quarterfinals; Semifinals; Final

== Competitors ==
Athlete	Nation
Adriana Carmona	Venezuela
Lee Wan Yuen	Malaysia
Myriam Baverel	France
Tanya White	Australia
chen Zhong	China
Mounia Bourguigue	Morocco
Natalia Ivanova	Russia
Veera Liukkonen	Finland
Dominique Bosshart	Canada
Ireane Ruíz	Spain
Sonallis Mayan	Cuba
Nastaša Vezmar	Croatia

== Results ==
Legend

- PTG — Won by points gap
- SUP — Won by superiority
- OT — Won on over time (Golden Point)
- WO — Walkover

=== Main bracket ===
Preliminary round
Lee Wan Yuen (MAS)	4
Myriam Baverel (FRA)	8
Tanya White (AUS)	0
Chen Zhong (CHN)	6
Veera Liukkonen (FIN)	4
Dominique Bosshart (CAN)	5
Ireane Ruíz (ESP)	3
Sonallis Mayan (CUB)	0

Quarterfinals
Adriana Carmona (VEN)	8
Myriam Baverel (FRA)	3
Chen Zhong (CHN)	5
Mounia Bourguigue (MAR)	3
Natalia Ivanova (RUS)	8
Dominique Bosshart (CAN)	6
Ireane Ruíz (ESP)	4
Nataša Vezmar (CRO)	7

Semifinals
Adriana Carmona (VEN)	6
Chen Zhong (CHN)	8
Natalia Ivanova (RUS)	6
Nataša Vezmar (CRO)	4

Gold medal match
Chen Zhong (CHN)	8
Natalia Ivanova (RUS)	3

=== Repechage ===
Quarterfinals
Mounia Bourguigue (MAR)	3
Tanya White (AUS)	1

Semifinals
Adriana Carmona (VEN)	8
Dominique Bosshart (CAN)	9
Nataša Vezmar (CRO)	4
Mounia Bourguigue (MAR)	1

Bronze medal match
Dominique Bosshart (CAN)	11
Nataša Vezmar (CRO)	8
