= Khaled Al-Dosari =

Saudi Arabian taekwondo practitioner

Khaled al-Dosari
Personal information
- Nationality: Saudi Arabia
- Born: 11 August 1972 (age 54)

Sport
- Sport: Taekwondo
Medal record
Representing Saudi Arabia
Men's taekwondo
World Championships
Bronze medal – third place	1997 Hong Kong	83 kg
Asian Championships
Silver medal – second place	1998 Ho Chi Minh City	83 kg
Bronze medal – third place	1996 Melbourne	83 kg
Bronze medal – third place	2002 Amman	84 kg
Bronze medal – third place	2004 Seongnam	84 kg

Khaled al-Dosari (Arabic: خالد الدوسري; born 11 August 1972) is a Saudi Arabian taekwondo practitioner. He competed in the men's +80 kg category in the 2000 Summer Olympics. He was defeated by Kim Kyong-hun of South Korea in the first round and then went on to defeat Carlos Delgado of Nicaragua and Milton Castro of Colombia in the repechage, before losing to Pascal Gentil of France in the bronze medal match. Al-Dosari was also the national flag bearer for Saudi Arabia at the Olympic opening ceremony.

== Achievements ==
Year	Tournament	Place	Weight class
2004	Asian Taekwondo Championships	3rd	Heavyweight (84 kg)
2002	Asian Taekwondo Championships	3rd	Heavyweight (84 kg)
2002	Asian Games	5th	Heavyweight (84 kg)
2000	Summer Olympics	5th	Heavyweight (80 kg)
1998	Asian Taekwondo Championships	2nd	Heavyweight (83 kg)
1997	World Taekwondo Championships	3rd	Heavyweight (83 kg)
1996	Asian Taekwondo Championships	3rd	Heavyweight (83 kg)
