= Nataša Vezmar =

Croatian taekwondo practitioner

Personal information
- Full name: Nataša Vezmar
- Nationality: Croatia
- Born: 24 October 1976 (age 50) Bjelovar, SR Croatia, SFR Yugoslavia
- Height: 1.80 m (5 ft 11 in)
- Weight: 77 kg (170 lb)

Sport
- Sport: Taekwondo
- Event: +67 kg
- Club: TK Metalac
- Coached by: Ivica Klaic
Medal record
Women's taekwondo
Representing Croatia
World Championships
Silver medal – second place	2003 Garmisch	+72 kg
Bronze medal – third place	1997 Hong Kong	+70 kg
European Championships
Gold medal – first place	1998 Eindhoven	+72 kg
Gold medal – first place	2002 Samsun	+72 kg
Gold medal – first place	2004 Lillehammer	+72 kg
Silver medal – second place	1994 Zagreb	+70 kg
Bronze medal – third place	2000 Patras	+72 kg

Nataša Vezmar (born October 24, 1976, in Bjelovar) is a Croatian taekwondo practitioner, who competed in the women's heavyweight category. One of Croatia's most prominent sporting figures in her decade, Vezmar held three European titles in the over-72 kg division, claimed two medals (a silver and a bronze) at the World Taekwondo Championships (1997 and 2003), and represented her nation Croatia in two editions of the Olympic Games (2000 and 2004). Vezmar also trained full-time for TK Metalac in Zagreb, under head coach and master Ivica Klaić.

Vezmar made her official debut at the 2000 Summer Olympics in Sydney, where she competed in the women's over-67 kg class. Seeded second and one of the fighters predicted to get an Olympic medal, Vezmar started her fight with an impressive 7–4 victory over Spain's Ireane Ruíz, before losing the semifinal to her Russian opponent Natalia Ivanova. In the repechage, Vezmar thrashed Mounia Bourguigue of Morocco at 4–1 to mount her chances of an Olympic medal. In the bronze medal match, Vezmar scored a 4–4 draw in the first two rounds against Dominique Bosshart, but her Canadian opponent responded with a feverish kicking exchange at the end to seal a seamless 11–8 victory, relegating Vezmar to fourth.

In 2003, Vezmar picked up a silver medal in the same category at the World Championships in Garmisch-Partenkirchen, Germany, following a tough 1–0 defeat to South Korea's Youn Hyun-jung.

At the 2004 Summer Olympics in Athens, Vezmar qualified for her second Croatian squad in the women's heavyweight class (+67 kg). Earlier in the process, she defeated Great Britain's Sarah Stevenson in the final to secure her place on the Croatian team at the European Olympic Qualification Tournament in Baku, Azerbaijan. Hoping to improve her fourth-place finish from Sydney, Vezmar moved directly into the quarterfinals with a first round bye, but rounded off a dismal display in a startling 4–5 defeat to 16-year-old Jordanian teen Nadin Dawani. With her opponent losing the semifinal to France's Myriam Baverel, Vezmar failed to slip into the repechage bracket for a chance of an Olympic bronze medal.
