= Nadin Dawani =

Jordanian Taekwondo practitioner

Nadin Dawani (born 20 April 1988) is a Jordanian taekwondo practitioner who competes in the 67 kg category. She was born in Amman, Jordan on 20 April 1988. She became the first Jordanian Taekwondo player to be named Asian Champion after winning the gold medal at the 2012 Asian Taekwondo Championships in Vietnam and has qualified for and represented Jordan in the Olympic Games of 2004, 2008 and 2012.

Dawani was the flag-bearer for Jordan at the 2012 Summer Olympics.

At the 2004 Olympics, Dawani reached the semi-finals. She beat Princess Dudu in the first round, then Nataša Vezmar in the second, before losing to Myriam Baverel in the semi-final. Because Baverel reached the final, Dawani was placed in the repechage but lost to Adriana Carmona. At the 2008 Summer Olympics, she lost her first match to Sarah Stevenson. In the 2012 Olympics, she lost 13–8 in the preliminary round to Maryna Konieva of Ukraine.
