= Taekwondo at the 2004 Summer Olympics – Women's +67 kg =

Taekwondo competition

Women's +67 kg at the Games of the XXVIII Olympiad
- Venue: Faliro Coastal Zone Olympic Complex
- Date: 29 August
- Competitors: 15 from 15 nations

Medalists
1st place, gold medalist(s)		Chen Zhong	China
2nd place, silver medalist(s)		Myriam Baverel	France
3rd place, bronze medalist(s)		Adriana Carmona	Venezuela

The women's +67 kg competition in taekwondo at the 2004 Summer Olympics in Athens took place on August 29 at the Faliro Coastal Zone Olympic Complex.

China's Chen Zhong capped off the final day of the Games with a perfect culmination for her national squad, as she defended her Olympic title from Sydney in the women's heavyweight division over France's Myriam Baverel with a satisfying 12–5 record. Returning to her second Olympic stint along with Chen and Baverel, Venezuela's Adriana Carmona thrashed her Brazilian opponent Natália Falavigna 7–4 to pick up a bronze.

== Competition format ==
The main bracket consisted of a single elimination tournament, culminating in the gold medal match. The taekwondo fighters eliminated in earlier rounds by the two finalists of the main bracket advanced directly to the repechage tournament. These matches determined the bronze medal winner for the event.

== Schedule ==
All times are Greece Standard Time (UTC+2)

Date	Time	Round
Sunday, 29 August 2004	09:00; 12:00; 13:30; 15:30	Preliminary Round; Quarterfinals; Semifinals; Final

== Results ==
Legend

- PTG — Won by points gap
- KO — Won by knockout
- SUP — Won by superiority
- OT — Won on over time (Golden Point)
- WO — Walkover

=== Main bracket ===
Preliminary round
Princess Dudu (NGR)	9
Nadin Dawani (JOR)	12
Myriam Baverel (FRA)	7
Dominique Bosshart (CAN)	5
Daniela Castrignano (ITA)	6
Mounia Bourguigue (MAR)	4
Natália Falavigna (BRA)	7
Tina Morgan (AUS)	2
Laurence Rase (BEL)	9
Natalya Mikryukova (UZB)	6
Chen Zhong (CHN)	7
Yoriko Okamoto (JPN)	5
Adriana Carmona (VEN)	8+
Sarah Stevenson (GBR)	8

Quarterfinals
Nataša Vezmar (CRO)	4
Nadin Dawani (JOR)	5
Myriam Baverel (FRA)	8+
Daniela Castrignano (ITA)	8
Natália Falavigna (BRA)	8
Laurence Rase (BEL)	4
Chen Zhong (CHN)	7
Adriana Carmona (VEN)	5

Semifinals
Nadin Dawani (JOR)	3
Myriam Baverel (FRA)	3+
Chen Zhong (CHN)	8
Natália Falavigna (BRA)	5

Gold medal match
Myriam Baverel (FRA)	5
Chen Zhong (CHN)	12

=== Repechage ===
Quarterfinals
Adriana Carmona (VEN)	5
Yoriko Okamoto (JPN)	2
Daniela Castrignano (ITA)	6
Dominique Bosshart (CAN)	3

Semifinals
Nadin Dawani (JOR)	8
Adriana Carmona (VEN)	11
Natália Falavigna (BRA)	6
Daniela Castrignano (ITA)	3

Bronze medal match
Adriana Carmona (VEN)	7
Natália Falavigna (BRA)	4
