= Daniela Castrignano =

Italian taekwondo practitioner

Personal information
- Full name: Daniela Castrignano
- Nationality: Italy
- Born: 11 December 1980 (age 45) Lecce, Italy
- Height: 1.82 m (5 ft 11 1/2 in)
- Weight: 67 kg (148 lb)

Sport
- Sport: Taekwondo
- Event: +67 kg
- Club: Team Perulli
- Coached by: Giuseppe Perulli
Medal record
Women's taekwondo
Representing Italy
World Championships
Bronze medal – third place	1996 Barcelona	+67 kg
Bronze medal – third place	2007 Beijing	+72 kg
World Cup
Bronze medal – third place	2002 Tokio	+72 kg
Olympic Games qualification World
Bronze medal – third place	2003 Paris	+67 kg
Military World Championships
Gold medal – first place	2008 Seoul	+72 kg
Military World Games
Gold medal – first place	2011 Rio de Janeiro	+72 kg
European Championships
Bronze medal – third place	1996 Zagreb	+67 kg
Gold medal – first place	1997 Patras	+67 kg
Silver medal – second place	2000 Patras	+72 kg
Silver medal – second place	2008 Rome	+72 kg

Daniela Castrignano (born December 11, 1980, in Lecce) is an Italian taekwondo practitioner, who competed in the women's heavyweight category. She obtained a total of nine medals in her sporting career, including one Gold and two silvers at the European Championships and a bronze in the over-72 kg division at the 2007 World Taekwondo Championships in Beijing. Castrignano was also selected to compete for the Italian taekwondo squad at the 2004 Summer Olympics in Athens, where she placed fifth in the women's heavyweight category (+67 kg). Throughout her sporting career, Castrignano trained for Team Perulli in her native Lecce under head coach and master Giuseppe Perulli.

Castrignano started her taekwondo career upon her admission at Team Perulli in Lecce, where she practiced and trained full-time under her personal coach Luigi Perulli. In 1997, she won a gold medal over Great Britain's Joanne Lawrence in the heavyweight class at the European Junior Championships in Patras. Castrignano's sporting career continued to thrive with a silver at the 2000 European Championships and then completed her full set of medals by retrieving the bronze at the 2003 World Olympic Qualification Tournament in Paris, France, which guaranteed her place on the Italian team for her major Olympic debut.

Castrignano was selected to compete for the Italian squad in the women's heavyweight class (+67 kg) at the 2004 Summer Olympics in Athens. She surpassed Morocco's Mounia Bourguigue with a score of 6–4 in her opening match, but the referee's decision slipped her Olympic gold medal contention in a stunning defeat to France's Myriam Baverel, after the quarterfinal match ended on 8–8 draw. In the repechage, Castrignano salvaged from her quarterfinal loss to slam Canadian fighter and 2000 Olympic bronze medalist Dominique Bosshart at 7–3. Castrignano lost to Brazil's Natália Falavigna in her next bout with a score of 3–6, relegating her to fifth position.

At the 2007 World Taekwondo Championships in Beijing, China, Castrignano shared bronze medals with Chinese Taipei's Tsui Fang-hsuan in the over-72 kg class after her immediate defeat to local favorite and double Olympic champion Chen Zhong in the semifinals. Castrignano also sought her bid for the 2008 Summer Olympics, but she fell behind France's Anne Caroline Graffe in the quarterfinal match at the European Qualification Tournament in Baku, Azerbaijan.
