= Woo Eun-joung =

South Korean taekwondo practitioner

Personal information
- Nationality: South Korean

Sport
- Sport: Taekwondo
Medal record
Representing South Korea
Women's taekwondo
World Championships
Gold medal – first place	1997 Hong Kong	Middleweight

Woo Eun-joung is a South Korean taekwondo practitioner.

She won a gold medal in middleweight at the 1997 World Taekwondo Championships in Hong Kong, by defeating Ireane Ruíz in the semifinal, and Mounia Bourguigue in the final.
