= Taekwondo at the 2004 Summer Olympics – Women's 67 kg =

Taekwondo competition

Women's 67 kg at the Games of the XXVIII Olympiad
- Venue: Faliro Coastal Zone Olympic Complex
- Date: 28 August
- Competitors: 15 from 15 nations

Medalists
1st place, gold medalist(s)		Luo Wei	China
2nd place, silver medalist(s)		Elisavet Mystakidou	Greece
3rd place, bronze medalist(s)		Hwang Kyung-seon	South Korea

The women's 67 kg competition in taekwondo at the 2004 Summer Olympics in Athens took place on August 28 at the Faliro Coastal Zone Olympic Complex.

China's Luo Wei narrowly outclassed the local favorite Elisavet Mystakidou of Greece in front of the raucous home crowd inside the Faliro Coastal Zone Olympic Complex to capture the gold medal in the event at 7–6. Meanwhile, South Korean fighter Hwang Kyung-Seon, who lost to Luo early in the opening match, mounted her strength throughout the repechage rounds to score a vigorous 5–2 victory for the bronze over Guatemala's Heidy Juárez.

== Competition format ==
The main bracket consisted of a single elimination tournament, culminating in the gold medal match. The taekwondo fighters eliminated in earlier rounds by the two finalists of the main bracket advanced directly to the repechage tournament. These matches determined the bronze medal winner for the event.

== Schedule ==
All times are Greece Standard Time (UTC+2)

Date	Time	Round
Saturday, 28 August 2004	11:00; 16:00; 17:30; 20:30	Preliminary Round; Quarterfinals; Semifinals; Final

== Results ==
Legend

- PTG — Won by points gap
- KO — Won by knockout
- SUP — Won by superiority
- OT — Won on over time (Golden Point)
- WO — Walkover

=== Main bracket ===
Preliminary round
Mouna Benabderrassoul (MAR)	6
Mounira Nahdi (TUN)	2
Nina Solheim (NOR)	5
Sandra Šarić (CRO)	2
Luo Wei (CHN)	10
Hwang Kyung-seon (KOR)	8
Elisavet Mystakidou (GRE)	4
Verina Wihongi (NZL)	0
Heidy Juárez (GUA)	7
Caroline Bartasek (AUS)	0
Charmie Sobers (NED)	7
Sarah Bainbridge (GBR)	6
Mary Antoinette Rivero (PHI)	10+
Vanina Sánchez (ARG)	10

Quarterfinals
Ineabelle Díaz (PUR)	4+
Mouna Benabderrassoul (MAR)	4
Nina Solheim (NOR)	1:05-3
Luo Wei (CHN)	RSC
Elisavet Mystakidou (GRE)	6
Heidy Juárez (GUA)	4
Charmie Sobers (NED)	4
Mary Antoinette Rivero (PHI)	10

Semifinals
Ineabelle Díaz (PUR)	3
Luo Wei (CHN)	5
Elisavet Mystakidou (GRE)	3
Mary Antoinette Rivero (PHI)	2

Gold medal match
Luo Wei (CHN)	7
Elisavet Mystakidou (GRE)	6

=== Repechage ===
Quarterfinals
Heidy Juárez (GUA)	4
Verina Wihongi (NZL)	1
Nina Solheim (NOR)
Hwang Kyung-seon (KOR)	WO

Semifinals
Ineabelle Díaz (PUR)	2
Heidy Juárez (GUA)	5
Mary Antoinette Rivero (PHI)	2
Hwang Kyung-seon (KOR)	6

Bronze medal match
Heidy Juárez (GUA)	2
Hwang Kyung-seon (KOR)	5
