= Taekwondo at the Pan American Games =

- No. of events: 12 (men: 5; women: 5; mixed: 2)

Taekwondo has been a part of the Pan American Games since 1987 edition in Indianapolis, United States, but only for men. Women's competition debuted at the 1995 Pan American Games in Mar del Plata, Argentina.

== Medal table ==
Updated after the 2023 Pan American Games.

Rank	Nation	Gold	Silver	Bronze	Total
1	Mexico	27	12	19	58
2	United States	21	12	24	57
3	Cuba	16	11	19	46
4	Venezuela	9	11	6	26
5	Canada	6	10	18	34
6	Dominican Republic	6	8	10	24
7	Brazil	5	7	14	26
8	Argentina	4	6	19	29
9	Colombia	1	5	13	19
10	Guatemala	1	2	4	7
11	Puerto Rico	1	1	15	17
12	Peru	0	4	4	8
13	Nicaragua	0	2	0	2
14	Chile	0	1	7	8
15	Haiti	0	1	2	3
15	Virgin Islands	0	1	2	3
17	Panama	0	1	1	2
18	Bolivia	0	1	0	1
18	Independent Athletes Team	0	1	0	1
20	Ecuador	0	0	7	7
21	Trinidad and Tobago	0	0	3	3
22	Costa Rica	0	0	2	2
22	Paraguay	0	0	2	2
24	Suriname	0	0	1	1
Totals (24 entries)		97	97	192	386

== See also ==
- List of Pan American Games medalists in taekwondo
