= Princess Dudu =

Nigerian taekwondo practitioner

Personal information
- Full name: Princess Dudu
- Nationality: Nigeria
- Born: 20 October 1978 (age 48) Benin City, Nigeria
- Height: 1.73 m (5 ft 8 in)
- Weight: 78 kg (172 lb)

Sport
- Sport: Taekwondo
- Event: +67 kg

Princess Dudu (born 20 October 1978 in Benin City) is a Nigerian taekwondo practitioner, who competed in the women's heavyweight category. She won a gold medal in the over 72-kg division at the 2003 All-Africa Games in Abuja, and also represented her nation Nigeria at the 2004 Summer Olympics.

Dudu qualified as a lone female taekwondo jin for the Nigerian squad in the women's heavyweight class (+67 kg) at the 2004 Summer Olympics in Athens, by placing second behind Morocco's Mounia Bourguigue and granting a berth from the African Olympic Qualifying Tournament in Cairo, Egypt. She failed to move beyond her opening match in a dismal 9–12 defeat to Jordanian fighter Nadin Dawani. With her opponent falling behind France's Myriam Baverel in the semifinals due to superiority rule, Dudu denied her chance to compete for the Olympic bronze medal through the repechage rounds.
