= José Márquez =

José Márquez may refer to:

- José Ignacio de Márquez (1793–1880), Colombian statesman, lawyer, and professor
- Jose Midas Marquez (born 1966), court administrator and the Supreme Court spokesperson of the Philippines
- José Guadarrama Márquez (fl. 1978–2012), Mexican politician
- José Jesús Márquez (fl. 1994–1998), Spanish taekwando fighter
- José Bernando Márquez (born 1989), Puerto Rican attorney, activist, and politician
- Joseph Marquez (born 1991), professional Super Smash Bros. Melee player

== See also ==
- José Marques da Silva (1869–1947), Portuguese architect and educator
- Josue Marquez (1946–2018), Puerto Rican boxer
