= Park Seon-mi (disambiguation) =

Park Seon-mi or Pak Sŏn-mi (박선미) may refer to:

- Park Sun-mi (born 1972), South Korean taekwondo practitioner
- Pak Sun-mi (born 1982), South Korean volleyball player
- Park Seon-mi (born 1982), South Korean field hockey player
