= Taekwondo at the 1999 Pan American Games =

- Taekwondo pictogram
- Venue: Winnipeg Convention Centre

This page shows the results of the Taekwondo Competition at the 1999 Pan American Games, held in Winnipeg, Manitoba, Canada at the Winnipeg Convention Centre. There were a total number of eight medal events, four for both men and women.

== Medal table ==
* Host nation (Canada)

Rank	Nation	Gold	Silver	Bronze	Total
1	Venezuela	2	2	0	4
2	Mexico	2	1	1	4
3	Cuba	1	2	2	5
4	Canada*	1	1	4	6
5	United States	1	1	3	5
6	Guatemala	1	0	0	1
7	Dominican Republic	0	1	1	2
8	Argentina	0	0	2	2
8	Puerto Rico	0	0	2	2
10	Ecuador	0	0	1	1
Totals (10 entries)		8	8	16	32

== Medalists ==
=== Men ===
Event	Gold	Silver	Bronze
58 kg	Oscar Salazar; Mexico	Luis García; Venezuela	Raymond Mourad; Canada
58 kg	Oscar Salazar; Mexico	Luis García; Venezuela	Peter Bardatsos; United States
68 kg	Steven López; United States	Luis Benítez; Dominican Republic	Alejandro Hernando; Argentina
68 kg	Steven López; United States	Luis Benítez; Dominican Republic	Yosvani Pérez; Cuba
80 kg	Víctor Estrada; Mexico	Ángel Matos; Cuba	Cristian Peñafiel; Ecuador
80 kg	Víctor Estrada; Mexico	Ángel Matos; Cuba	Stewart Gill; United States
+80 kg	Luis Noguera; Venezuela	Rodrigo Martínez; Mexico	Danny Vizcaino; Dominican Republic
+80 kg	Luis Noguera; Venezuela	Rodrigo Martínez; Mexico	Darrell Henegan; Canada

=== Women ===
Event	Gold	Silver	Bronze
49 kg	Roxane Forget; Canada	Kay Poe; United States	Agueda López; Mexico
49 kg	Roxane Forget; Canada	Kay Poe; United States	Yuliet Labrada; Cuba
57 kg	Noemar Leal; Venezuela	Sailin Alvarez; Cuba	Vanina Sánchez; Argentina
57 kg	Noemar Leal; Venezuela	Sailin Alvarez; Cuba	Gaël Texier; Canada
67 kg	Heidy Juárez; Guatemala	Barbara Pak; Canada	Ineabelle Díaz; Puerto Rico
67 kg	Heidy Juárez; Guatemala	Barbara Pak; Canada	Barbara Kunkel; United States
+67 kg	Sonallis Mayan; Cuba	Adriana Carmona; Venezuela	Dominique Bosshart; Canada
+67 kg	Sonallis Mayan; Cuba	Adriana Carmona; Venezuela	Luz Medina; Puerto Rico
