= Milton Castro =

Milton Castro may refer to:

- Milton de Castro, Brazilian sprinter
- Milton Castro (taekwondo)
