= Charmie Sobers =

Dutch taekwondo practitioner

Personal information
- Full name: Charmian Colette Sobers
- Nationality: Netherlands
- Born: 19 January 1973 (age 53) Willemstad, Curaçao, Netherlands; Antilles
- Height: 1.65 m (5 ft 5 in)
- Weight: 65 kg (143 lb)

Sport
- Sport: Taekwondo
- Event: 67 kg

Charmian Colette "Charmie" Sobers (born 19 January 1973 in Willemstad, Curaçao) is a retired Dutch taekwondo practitioner of Curaçaoan descent. Sobers qualified for the Netherlands in the women's welterweight category (67 kg) at the 2004 Summer Olympics in Athens by finishing third and receiving a berth from the European Qualification Tournament in Baku, Azerbaijan. Sobers outclassed Great Britain's Sarah Bainbridge in the preliminary round of sixteen before losing out the quarterfinal match to Philippines' Mary Antoinette Rivero with a default score of 4–10.
