= Guatemala at the 2007 Pan American Games =

- IOC code: GUA
- NOC: Comité Olímpico Guatemalteco
- Website: www.cog.org.gt

in Rio de Janeiro 13–29 July 2007
- Competitors: 164
- Flag bearer: Kevin Cordón
- Medals Ranked 14th: Gold 2 Silver 3 Bronze 2 Total 7

Pan American Games appearances (overview)
- 1951; 1955; 1959; 1963; 1967; 1971; 1975; 1979; 1983; 1987; 1991; 1995; 1999; 2003; 2007; 2011; 2015; 2019; 2023

Other related appearances
- Independent Athletes Team (2023)

The 15th Pan American Games were held in Rio de Janeiro, Brazil from 13 July 2007 to 29 July 2007.

== Medals ==
=== Gold ===
===== Karate =====
- Women's Kumite (– 53 kg): Cheili González

===== Sailing =====
- Mixed Hobie Cat 16: Juan Ignacio Maegli and Cristina Guirola

=== Silver ===
===== Athletics =====
- Men's Marathon: José Amado García

===== Badminton =====
- Men's Singles Competition: Kevin Cordón

===== Taekwondo =====
- Women's – 67 kg: Heidy Juarez

=== Bronze ===
===== Badminton =====
- Men's Doubles Competition: Erick Anguiano and Pedro Yang

===== Taekwondo =====
- Men's – 58 kg: José Rosal

== Results by event ==
=== Triathlon ===
==== Men's Competition ====
- Carlos Friely

- did not finish — no ranking

== See also ==
- Guatemala at the 2008 Summer Olympics
