= 1997 World Taekwondo Championships =

Taekwondo competition

- Venue: Hong Kong Coliseum
- Location: Hong Kong
- Dates: 19–23 November 1997

Champions
- Men: South Korea
- Women: South Korea

The 1997 World Taekwondo Championships were the 13th edition of the World Taekwondo Championships, and were held in Hong Kong from November 19 to November 23, 1997, with 710 athletes participating from 80 countries.

== Medal summary ==
=== Men ===
Event	Gold	Silver	Bronze
Finweight (−50 kg)	Juan Antonio Ramos; Spain	Roberto Cruz; Philippines	Lee Hou-kun; Chinese Taipei
Finweight (−50 kg)	Juan Antonio Ramos; Spain	Roberto Cruz; Philippines	Nazım Yılmaz; Turkey
Flyweight (−54 kg)	Jin Seung-tae; South Korea	Tsai Yi-ya; Chinese Taipei	Geraldhy Altamirano; Ecuador
Flyweight (−54 kg)	Jin Seung-tae; South Korea	Tsai Yi-ya; Chinese Taipei	Ludovic Vo; France
Bantamweight (−58 kg)	Huang Chih-hsiung; Chinese Taipei	Mehdi Bibak; Iran	Liu Chuang; China
Bantamweight (−58 kg)	Huang Chih-hsiung; Chinese Taipei	Mehdi Bibak; Iran	Óscar Salazar; Mexico
Featherweight (−64 kg)	Kim In-dong; South Korea	Ekrem Boyalı; Turkey	Rafael Zúñiga; Mexico
Featherweight (−64 kg)	Kim In-dong; South Korea	Ekrem Boyalı; Turkey	Hsu Chi-hung; Chinese Taipei
Lightweight (−70 kg)	Tamer Abdelmoneim Hussein; Egypt	Christophe Negrel; France	Shim Ki-sun; South Korea
Lightweight (−70 kg)	Tamer Abdelmoneim Hussein; Egypt	Christophe Negrel; France	Zoran Krajčinović; Yugoslavia
Welterweight (−76 kg)	José Jesús Márquez; Spain	Marco Scheiterbauer; Germany	Kim Kyong-hun; South Korea
Welterweight (−76 kg)	José Jesús Márquez; Spain	Marco Scheiterbauer; Germany	Majid Aflaki; Iran
Middleweight (−83 kg)	Lee Dong-wan; South Korea	Alfredo Escobar; Cuba	Rubén Montesinos; Spain
Middleweight (−83 kg)	Lee Dong-wan; South Korea	Alfredo Escobar; Cuba	Michalis Tolios; Greece
Heavyweight (+83 kg)	Kim Je-kyoung; South Korea	Hassan Aslani; Iran	Khaled Al-Dosari; Saudi Arabia
Heavyweight (+83 kg)	Kim Je-kyoung; South Korea	Hassan Aslani; Iran	Nelson Sáenz; Cuba

=== Women ===
Event	Gold	Silver	Bronze
Finweight (−43 kg)	Yang So-hee; South Korea	Li Huang; China	Thy Vy Sok; Australia
Finweight (−43 kg)	Yang So-hee; South Korea	Li Huang; China	Kay Poe; United States
Flyweight (−47 kg)	Chi Shu-ju; Chinese Taipei	Yoon Song-hee; South Korea	Kylie Treadwell; Australia
Flyweight (−47 kg)	Chi Shu-ju; Chinese Taipei	Yoon Song-hee; South Korea	Mandy Meloon; United States
Bantamweight (−51 kg)	Hwang Eun-suk; South Korea	Roxane Forget; Canada	Lauren Burns; Australia
Bantamweight (−51 kg)	Hwang Eun-suk; South Korea	Roxane Forget; Canada	Elisabet Delgado; Spain
Featherweight (−55 kg)	Jung Jae-eun; South Korea	Carine Zelmonovitch; France	Lai Hsiu-wen; Chinese Taipei
Featherweight (−55 kg)	Jung Jae-eun; South Korea	Carine Zelmonovitch; France	Raveevadee Pansombut; Thailand
Lightweight (−60 kg)	Kang Hae-eun; South Korea	Hung Chia-chun; Chinese Taipei	Luisa Arnanz; Spain
Lightweight (−60 kg)	Kang Hae-eun; South Korea	Hung Chia-chun; Chinese Taipei	Miet Filipović; Croatia
Welterweight (−65 kg)	Cho Hyang-mi; South Korea	Morfou Drosidou; Greece	Marlene Ramírez; Mexico
Welterweight (−65 kg)	Cho Hyang-mi; South Korea	Morfou Drosidou; Greece	Hsu Chih-ling; Chinese Taipei
Middleweight (−70 kg)	Woo Eun-joung; South Korea	Mounia Bourguigue; Morocco	Mónica del Real; Mexico
Middleweight (−70 kg)	Woo Eun-joung; South Korea	Mounia Bourguigue; Morocco	Ireane Ruíz; Spain
Heavyweight (+70 kg)	Jung Myoung-sook; South Korea	Natalia Ivanova; Russia	Nataša Vezmar; Croatia
Heavyweight (+70 kg)	Jung Myoung-sook; South Korea	Natalia Ivanova; Russia	Chiu Meng-jen; Chinese Taipei

== Medal table ==
Rank	Nation	Gold	Silver	Bronze	Total
1	South Korea	11	1	2	14
2	Chinese Taipei	2	2	5	9
3	Spain	2	0	4	6
4	Egypt	1	0	0	1
5	France	0	2	1	3
5	Iran	0	2	1	3
7	China	0	1	1	2
7	Cuba	0	1	1	2
7	Greece	0	1	1	2
7	Turkey	0	1	1	2
11	Canada	0	1	0	1
11	Germany	0	1	0	1
11	Morocco	0	1	0	1
11	Philippines	0	1	0	1
11	Russia	0	1	0	1
16	Mexico	0	0	4	4
17	Australia	0	0	3	3
18	Croatia	0	0	2	2
18	United States	0	0	2	2
20	Ecuador	0	0	1	1
20	Saudi Arabia	0	0	1	1
20	Thailand	0	0	1	1
20	Yugoslavia	0	0	1	1
Totals (23 entries)		16	16	32	64
