= Cuba at the 1995 Pan American Games =

- IOC code: CUB
- NOC: Cuban Olympic Committee

in Mar del Plata 11–26 March 1995
- Medals Ranked 2nd: Gold 112 Silver 66 Bronze 60 Total 238

Pan American Games appearances (overview)
- 1951; 1955; 1959; 1963; 1967; 1971; 1975; 1979; 1983; 1987; 1991; 1995; 1999; 2003; 2007; 2011; 2015; 2019; 2023

The 12th Pan American Games were held in Mar del Plata, Argentina from March 11 to March 26, 1995.

== Medals ==
=== Gold ===
===== Archery =====
- Women's Recurve (70 m): Jacquelin Fernández

===== Athletics =====
- Men's 200 meters: Iván García
- Men's 400 meters: Norberto Téllez
- Men's High Jump: Javier Sotomayor
- Men's Long Jump: Iván Pedroso
- Men's Triple Jump: Yoelbi Quesada
- Men's Discus: Roberto Moya
- Men's Javelin: Emeterio González
- Men's 4×100 meters: Joel Isasi, Jorge Aguilera, Joel Lamela, and Iván García
- Men's 4×400 meters: Jorge Crusellas, Norberto Téllez, Omar Meña, and Iván García
- Women's 200 meters: Liliana Allen
- Women's 400 meters: Julia Duporty
- Women's 100 m Hurdles: Aliuska López
- Women's High Jump: Ioamnet Quintero
- Women's Long Jump: Niurka Montalvo
- Women's Triple Jump: Laiza Carrillo
- Women's Discus: Maritza Martén
- Women's Javelin: Xiomara Rivero
- Women's 4×400 meters: Idalmis Bonne, Surella Morales, Nancy McLeón, and Julia Duporty

===== Boxing =====
- Men's Bantamweight (– 54 kg): Juan Despaigne
- Men's Featherweight (– 57 kg): Arnaldo Mesa
- Men's Lightweight (– 60 kg): Julio Gonzáles
- Men's Light Middleweight (– 71 kg): Alfredo Duvergel
- Men's Middleweight (– 75 kg): Ariel Hernández
- Men's Heavyweight (– 91 kg): Félix Savón
- Men's Super Heavyweight (+ 91 kg): Leonardo Martínez Fiz

===== Cycling =====
- Men's 1.000m Time Trial (Track): Gil Cordovés

===== Diving =====
- Women's 1m Springboard: Mayte Garbey

===== Gymnastics =====
- Men's All-Around: Eric López
- Men's Floor Exercise: Damian Merino
- Men's Parallel Bars: Eric López
- Men's Pommel Horse: Eric López
- Men's Rings: Damian Merino

===== Handball =====
- Men's Team Competition: Cuba men's national handball team

===== Judo =====
- Men's Flyweight (– 56 kg): Ismady Alonso
- Men's Featherweight (– 65 kg): Israel Hernández
- Women's Flyweight (– 45 kg): Mirledis Turro
- Women's Extra Lightweight (– 48 kg): Amarilis Savón
- Women's Half Lightweight (– 52 kg): Legna Verdecia
- Women's Lightweight (– 56 kg): Driulis González
- Women's Half Middleweight (– 61 kg): Ileana Beltrán
- Women's Middleweight (– 66 kg): Odalis Revé
- Women's Half Heavyweight (– 72 kg): Diadenis Luna
- Women's Heavyweight (+ 72 kg): Daima Beltrán

===== Karate =====
- Men's Kumite (– 66 kg): Pablo Torres del Toro
- Men's Kumite (– 72 kg): José Vilela
- Men's Kumite (– 80 kg): Noel Hernández
- Women's Kumite (– 53 kg): Vivian Sosa
- Women's Kumite (Team): Cuba

===== Taekwondo =====
- Men's – 70 kg: Roberto Abreu
- Men's – 76 kg: Arturo Utria
- Men's + 83 kg: Nelson Saenz
- Women's – 60 kg: Sonallis Mayan

===== Volleyball =====
- Women's Team Competition: Cuba women's national volleyball team

===== Weightlifting =====
- Men's Flyweight (– 54 kg): Jesús Aparicio
- Men's Bantamweight (– 59 kg): William Vargas
- Men's Featherweight (– 64 kg): Idalberto Aranda
- Men's Lightweight (– 70 kg): Rafael Gómez
- Men's Lightweight (– 76 kg): Pablo Lara
- Men's Middle-Heavyweight (– 91 kg): Carlos Alexis Hernández
- Men's First-Heavyweight (– 99 kg): Alexander Fonseca
- Men's Super Heavyweight (+ 108 kg): Modesto Sánchez

===== Wrestling =====
- Men's Freestyle (– 48 kg): Alexis Vila
- Men's Freestyle (– 74 kg): Alberto Rodríguez
- Men's Greco-Roman (– 52 kg): Raúl Francisco Martínez
- Men's Greco-Roman (– 62 kg): Juan Luis Marén
- Men's Greco-Roman (– 68 kg): Liubal Colas
- Men's Greco-Roman (– 74 kg): Filiberto Azcuy
- Men's Greco-Roman (– 82 kg): Alexei Banes
- Men's Greco-Roman (– 90 kg): Reynaldo Peña
- Men's Greco-Roman (– 100 kg): Héctor Milian

=== Silver ===
===== Archery =====
- Women's Recurve Team: Cuba

===== Athletics =====
- Men's 100 meters: Joel Isasi
- Men's 400 meters: Omar Meña
- Men's 800 meters: Alain Miranda
- Men's 110 m hurdles: Emilio Valle
- Men's Long Jump: Jaime Jefferson
- Men's Shot Put: Jorge Montenegro
- Men's Discus: Alexis Elizalde
- Men's Hammer: Alberto Sánchez
- Men's Decathlon: Eugenio Balanqué
- Women's 100 meters: Liliana Allen
- Women's 400 meters: Nancy McLeón
- Women's High Jump: Silvia Costa
- Women's Triple Jump: Niurka Montalvo
- Women's Discus: Bárbara Hechevarría
- Women's Heptathlon: Magalys García
- Women's 4×100 metres: Miriam Ferrer, Aliuska López, Liliana Allen, and Dainelky Pérez

Frontenis

- Women’s FC 30 m Frontenis Double:Odalys De Los Rios Garces, Janny Shang

===== Boxing =====
- Men's Light Flyweight (– 48 kg): Juan Ramírez
- Men's Flyweight (– 51 kg): Raúl González

===== Cycling =====
- Men's 4.000m Team Pursuit (Track): Cuba
- Women's 3.000m Individual Pursuit (Track): Yoanka González
- Women's Individual Time Trial (Road): Yacel Ojeda

===== Gymnastics =====
- Men's Parallel Bars: Lazaro Lamelas
- Men's Vault: Lazaro Lamelas
- Men's Team: Cuba
- Women's Beam: Annia Portuondo
- Women's Team: Cuba

===== Judo =====
- Men's Bantamweight (– 60 kg): Manolo Poulot
- Men's Lightweight (– 71 kg): Erick de la Paz
- Men's Heavyweight (+ 95 kg): Frank Moreno

===== Karate =====
- Men's Kumite (Open Class): Lazaro Montano

===== Swimming =====
- Men's 200 m Backstroke: Rodolfo Falcón

===== Taekwondo =====
- Women's – 43 kg: Yanet Puerto
- Women's – 47 kg: Yunia Cruz
- Women's – 65 kg: Lazara Zayas

===== Weightlifting =====
- Men's Light-Heavyweight (– 83 kg): Eduardo Moreno
- Men's Heavyweight (– 108 kg): Osvaldo Bango

===== Wrestling =====
- Men's Freestyle (– 52 kg): Carlos Varela
- Men's Greco-Roman (– 57 kg): William Lara

=== Bronze ===
===== Athletics =====
- Men's Pole Vault: Alberto Manzano
- Men's Triple Jump: Yoel García
- Women's 100 m Hurdles: Odalys Adams
- Women's 400 m Hurdles: Lency Montelier
- Women's Shot Put: Yumileidi Cumbá

===== Boxing =====
- Men's Light Welterweight (– 63.5 kg): Héctor Vinent

===== Cycling =====
- Men's 1.000m Sprint (Track): Gil Cordovés
- Women's 3.000m Points Race (Track): Dania Pérez
- Women's Individual Race (Road): Yacel Ojeda

===== Diving =====
- Men's 1m Springboard: Abel Ramírez

===== Gymnastics =====
- Men's All-Around: Lazaro Lamelas
- Men's Rings: Eric López
- Women's Floor Exercise: Leyanet González
- Women's Uneven Bars: Annia Portuondo
- Women's Beam: Leyanet González
- Women's Vault: Annia Portuondo

===== Judo =====
- Men's Light Heavyweight (– 95 kg): Belarmino Salgado

===== Swimming =====
- Men's 100 m Backstroke: Rodolfo Falcón

===== Taekwondo =====
- Men's – 50 kg: Reynaldo Ross
- Men's – 54 kg: Alexei Pedroso
- Men's – 64 kg: Ivens Valladares
- Women's – 55 kg: Niuris Díaz
- Women's + 70 kg: Yudelki Popo

===== Volleyball =====
- Men's Team Competition: Cuba men's national volleyball team

===== Wrestling =====
- Men's Freestyle (– 57 kg): Alejandro Puerto
- Men's Freestyle (– 62 kg): Carlos Julian Ortíz
- Men's Freestyle (– 68 kg): Jesús Eugenio Rodríguez
- Men's Freestyle (– 82 kg): Ariel Ramos
- Men's Freestyle (– 90 kg): Miguel Molina
- Men's Greco-Roman (– 48 kg): Wilber Sánchez

== See also ==
- Cuba at the 1996 Summer Olympics
