= Mounira Nahdi =

Tunisian taekwondo practitioner

Personal information
- Full name: Mounira Nahdi
- Nationality: Tunisia
- Born: 15 January 1985 (age 41) Tunis, Tunisia
- Height: 1.72 m (5 ft 7 1/2 in)
- Weight: 67 kg (148 lb)

Sport
- Sport: Taekwondo
- Event: 67 kg

Mounira Nahdi (Arabic: منيرة النهدي; born 15 January 1985 in Tunis) is a Tunisian taekwondo practitioner, who competed in the women's welterweight category.

Nahdi qualified as a lone female taekwondo fighter for the Tunisian squad in the women's welterweight class (67 kg) at the 2004 Summer Olympics in Athens by placing second and granting a berth from the African Olympic Qualifying Tournament in Cairo, Egypt. She lost her opening match to neighboring Morocco's Mouna Benabderrassoul with a score of 2–6. With her opponent falling behind Puerto Rico's Ineabelle Díaz in the quarterfinals, Nahdi denied her chance to compete for the Olympic bronze medal through the repechage.
