= Sarah Bainbridge =

English taekwondo practitioner

Personal information
- Full name: Sarah Jane Bainbridge
- Nationality: United Kingdom
- Born: 7 October 1982 (age 44) Fleetwood, Lancashire, England
- Height: 1.69 m (5 ft 6 1/2 in)
- Weight: 67 kg (148 lb)

Sport
- Sport: Taekwondo
- Event: 67 kg
- Club: Fleetwood Taekwondo Club
- Coached by: Alan Bainbridge
Medal record
Women's taekwondo
Representing the United Kingdom
Summer Universiade
Bronze medal – third place	2003 Daegu	67 kg

Sarah Jane Bainbridge (born 7 October 1982 in Fleetwood, Lancashire) is an English taekwondo practitioner, who competed in the women's welterweight category. She won a gold medal in the 68-kg division at the 1999 European Junior Championships in Nicosia, Cyprus, retrieved a bronze at the 2003 Summer Universiade in Daegu, South Korea, and had been thereby selected to Team GB's four-person taekwondo squad for the 2004 Summer Olympics in Athens. Starting her career at age 16, Bainbridge trained full-time for Fleetwood Taekwondo Club in her native Fleetwood, under her personal coach, master, and father Alan Bainbridge.

Bainbridge spurred public attention on her senior debut at the 2003 Summer Universiade in Daegu, South Korea, where she shared bronze medals with the Netherlands' Luttikhuis Oude in the women's 67-kg division.

At the 2004 Summer Olympics in Athens, Bainbridge qualified for Team GB's taekwondo squad in the women's welterweight class (67 kg). Earlier in the process, she finished second behind Croatia's Sandra Šarić from the European Olympic Qualifying Tournament in Baku, Azerbaijan to assure a spot on the British Olympic team. Bainbridge produced a cautious fight against the Netherlands' Charmie Sobers during her opening bout, resulting in a defeat by just a single-point deficit with a narrow record of 6–7. When Sobers lost the quarterfinal match to her Filipino opponent Mary Antoinette Rivero, Bainbridge denied her chance to compete for Great Britain's first ever Olympic medal in the repechage.
