= Lai Hsiu-wen =

Taiwanese taekwondo practitioner

Personal information
- Nationality: Taiwanese
- Born: 21 September 1976 (age 49)

Sport
- Sport: Taekwondo
Medal record
Representing Chinese Taipei
Women's taekwondo
World Championships
Bronze medal – third place	1997 Hong Kong	Featherweight

Lai Hsiu-wen (born 21 September 1976) is a Taiwanese taekwondo practitioner. She won a bronze medal in featherweight at the 1997 World Taekwondo Championships in Hong Kong, after being defeated by Jung Jae-eun in the semi-final. She also competed at the 1995 World Taekwondo Championships.
