= Michelle Thompson =

Michelle Thompson may refer to:

- Michelle Thompson (taekwondo), American taekwondo practitioner
- Michelle Thompson (politician), member of the Nova Scotia House of Assembly

== See also ==
- Michelle Thomson, member of the Scottish Parliament
