= 1995 World Taekwondo Championships =

Taekwondo competition

- Venue: Folk Arts Theater
- Location: Manila, Philippines
- Dates: 17–21 November 1995

Champions
- Men: South Korea
- Women: South Korea

The 1995 World Taekwondo Championships were the 12th edition of the World Taekwondo Championships, and were held in Manila, Philippines from November 17 to November 21, 1995, with 598 athletes participating from 77 countries.

== Medal summary ==
=== Men ===
Event	Gold	Silver	Bronze
Finweight (−50 kg)	Jin Seung-tae; South Korea	Roberto Cruz; Philippines	Mohammad Al-Hamed; Jordan
Finweight (−50 kg)	Jin Seung-tae; South Korea	Roberto Cruz; Philippines	Carlos Chamorro; Sweden
Flyweight (−54 kg)	Cihat Kutluca; Turkey	Mehrdad Rokni; Iran	Gergely Salim; Hungary
Flyweight (−54 kg)	Cihat Kutluca; Turkey	Mehrdad Rokni; Iran	Rubén Palafox; Mexico
Bantamweight (−58 kg)	Chang Dae-soon; South Korea	Gabriel Esparza; Spain	Huang Chih-hsiung; Chinese Taipei
Bantamweight (−58 kg)	Chang Dae-soon; South Korea	Gabriel Esparza; Spain	Trần Quang Hạ; Vietnam
Featherweight (−64 kg)	Kim Byung-uk; South Korea	Clayton Barber; United States	Bijan Moghanloo; Iran
Featherweight (−64 kg)	Kim Byung-uk; South Korea	Clayton Barber; United States	Claudio Nolano; Italy
Lightweight (−70 kg)	Aziz Acharki; Germany	Roberto Estrada; Mexico	David Gonzales; Sweden
Lightweight (−70 kg)	Aziz Acharki; Germany	Roberto Estrada; Mexico	Fariborz Askari; Iran
Welterweight (−76 kg)	José Jesús Márquez; Spain	Jean López; United States	Nico Davis; Sweden
Welterweight (−76 kg)	José Jesús Márquez; Spain	Jean López; United States	Liu Tsu-ien; Chinese Taipei
Middleweight (−83 kg)	Lee Dong-wan; South Korea	Ulysses Marcelino; Philippines	Mickaël Meloul; France
Middleweight (−83 kg)	Lee Dong-wan; South Korea	Ulysses Marcelino; Philippines	Zoran Prerad; Yugoslavia
Heavyweight (+83 kg)	Kim Je-kyoung; South Korea	Pascal Gentil; France	Massimiliano Romano; Italy
Heavyweight (+83 kg)	Kim Je-kyoung; South Korea	Pascal Gentil; France	Lúcio Aurélio de Freitas; Brazil

=== Women ===
Event	Gold	Silver	Bronze
Finweight (−43 kg)	Huang Chiu-chin; Chinese Taipei	Yang So-hee; South Korea	Cristina Atzeni; Italy
Finweight (−43 kg)	Huang Chiu-chin; Chinese Taipei	Yang So-hee; South Korea	Coral Falco; Spain
Flyweight (−47 kg)	Hamide Bıkçın; Turkey	Monika Sprengel; Germany	Betsy Ortiz; Puerto Rico
Flyweight (−47 kg)	Hamide Bıkçın; Turkey	Monika Sprengel; Germany	Trần Thị Mỹ Linh; Vietnam
Bantamweight (−51 kg)	Won Sun-jin; South Korea	Michelle Thompson; United States	Minako Hatakeyama; Japan
Bantamweight (−51 kg)	Won Sun-jin; South Korea	Michelle Thompson; United States	Wu Shan-chen; Chinese Taipei
Featherweight (−55 kg)	Lee Seung-min; South Korea	Leonildes Santos; Brazil	Nuray Deliktaş; Turkey
Featherweight (−55 kg)	Lee Seung-min; South Korea	Leonildes Santos; Brazil	Janet Glasman; United States
Lightweight (−60 kg)	Park Kyung-suk; South Korea	Vanina Sánchez; Argentina	Marlene Ramírez; Mexico
Lightweight (−60 kg)	Park Kyung-suk; South Korea	Vanina Sánchez; Argentina	Miet Filipović; Croatia
Welterweight (−65 kg)	Cho Hyang-mi; South Korea	Hsu Chih-ling; Chinese Taipei	İnci Taşyürek; Turkey
Welterweight (−65 kg)	Cho Hyang-mi; South Korea	Hsu Chih-ling; Chinese Taipei	Dana Martin; United States
Middleweight (−70 kg)	Ireane Ruíz; Spain	Park Sun-mi; South Korea	Heidy Juárez; Guatemala
Middleweight (−70 kg)	Ireane Ruíz; Spain	Park Sun-mi; South Korea	Mónica del Real; Mexico
Heavyweight (+70 kg)	Jung Myoung-sook; South Korea	Yolanda García; Spain	Nataša Vezmar; Croatia
Heavyweight (+70 kg)	Jung Myoung-sook; South Korea	Yolanda García; Spain	Huang Hsiao-ying; Chinese Taipei

== Medal table ==
Rank	Nation	Gold	Silver	Bronze	Total
1	South Korea	10	2	0	12
2	Spain	2	2	1	5
3	Turkey	2	0	2	4
4	Chinese Taipei	1	1	4	6
5	Germany	1	1	0	2
6	United States	0	3	2	5
7	Philippines	0	2	0	2
8	Mexico	0	1	3	4
9	Iran	0	1	2	3
10	Brazil	0	1	1	2
10	France	0	1	1	2
12	Argentina	0	1	0	1
13	Italy	0	0	3	3
13	Sweden	0	0	3	3
15	Croatia	0	0	2	2
15	Vietnam	0	0	2	2
17	Guatemala	0	0	1	1
17	Hungary	0	0	1	1
17	Japan	0	0	1	1
17	Jordan	0	0	1	1
17	Puerto Rico	0	0	1	1
17	Yugoslavia	0	0	1	1
Totals (22 entries)		16	16	32	64
