= Taekwondo at the 2000 Summer Olympics – Men's +80 kg =

Taekwondo competition

Men's +80 kg at the Games of the XXVII Olympiad
- Venue: State Sports Centre
- Date: 30 September
- Competitors: 13 from 13 nations

Medalists
1st place, gold medalist(s)		Kim Kyong-hun	South Korea
2nd place, silver medalist(s)		Daniel Trenton	Australia
3rd place, bronze medalist(s)		Pascal Gentil	France

The men's +80 kg competition in taekwondo at the 2000 Summer Olympics in Sydney took place on 30 September at the State Sports Centre.

1997 World champion Kim Kyong-hun captured South Korea's third gold in the sport, as he prevailed over the local favorite Daniel Trenton of Australia 6–2 in the men's heavyweight final despite the ridicule and commotion from a raucous, partisan home crowd. The bronze medal was awarded to France's Pascal Gentil after he knocked out his Saudi Arabian opponent Khaled Al-Dosari in the second round of the repechage final match.

== Competition format ==
The main bracket consisted of a single elimination tournament, culminating in the gold medal match. The taekwondo fighters eliminated in earlier rounds by the two finalists of the main bracket advanced directly to the repechage tournament. These matches determined the bronze medal winner for the event.

== Schedule ==
All times are Greece Standard Time (UTC+2)

Date	Time	Round
Saturday, 30 September 2000	09:00; 11:30; 15:30; 20:30	Preliminary Round; Quarterfinals; Semifinals; Final

== Competitors ==
Athlete	Nation
Colin Daley	Great Britain
Marcus Thorén	Sweden
Daniel Trenton	Australia
Donald Ravenscroft	South Africa
Alexandros Nikolaidis	Greece
Zhu Feng	China
Milton Castro	Colombia
Carlos Delgado	Nicaragua
Khaled Al-Dosari	Saudi Arabia
Kim Kyong-hun	South Korea
Pascal Gentil	France
Yahia Rashwan	Egypt
Nelson Saenz	Cuba

== Results ==
Legend

- PTG — Won by points gap
- SUP — Won by superiority
- OT — Won on over time (Golden Point)
- WO — Walkover

=== Main bracket ===
Preliminary round
Marcus Thorén (SWE)	3
Daniel Trenton (AUS)	6
Donald Ravenscroft (RSA)
Alexandros Nikolaidis (GRE)	WO
Zhu Feng (CHN)	5
Milton Castro (COL)	6
Khaled Al-Dosari (KSA)	0
Kim Kyong-hun (KOR)	5
Pascal Gentil (FRA)	4
Yahia Rashwan (EGY)	1

Quarterfinals
Colin Daley (GBR)	4
Daniel Trenton (AUS)	8
Alexandros Nikolaidis (GRE)	0:00-2
Milton Castro (COL)	RSC
Carlos Delgado (NCA)	0
Kim Kyong-hun (KOR)	5
Pascal Gentil (FRA)	KO
Nelson Saenz (CUB)	0:00-3

Semifinals
Daniel Trenton (AUS)	8
Milton Castro (COL)	2
Kim Kyong-hun (KOR)	6
Pascal Gentil (FRA)	2

Gold medal match
Daniel Trenton (AUS)	2
Kim Kyong-hun (KOR)	6

=== Repechage ===
Quarterfinals
Carlos Delgado (NCA)	1
Khaled Al-Dosari (KSA)	3
Colin Daley (GBR)	9
Marcus Thorén (SWE)	2

Semifinals
Milton Castro (COL)	2
Khaled Al-Dosari (KSA)	3
Pascal Gentil (FRA)	3
Colin Daley (GBR)	0

Bronze medal match
Khaled Al-Dosari (KSA)	2:04-2
Pascal Gentil (FRA)	KO
