= Chiu Meng-jen =

Taiwanese taekwondo practitioner

Personal information
- Nationality: Taiwanese
- Born: 26 July 1978 (age 47)

Sport
- Sport: Taekwondo
Medal record
Representing Chinese Taipei
Women's taekwondo
World Championships
| Bronze medal – third place | 1997 Hong Kong | Heavyweight |

Chiu Meng-jen (born 26 July 1978) is a Taiwanese taekwondo practitioner. She won a bronze medal in heavyweight at the 1997 World Taekwondo Championships in Hong Kong, after being defeated by Natalia Ivanova in the semifinal.
