= Huang Chiu-chin =

Taiwanese taekwondo practitioner

Personal information
- Nationality: Taiwanese
- Born: 17 October 1978 (age 47)

Sport
- Sport: Taekwondo
Medal record
Representing Chinese Taipei
Women's taekwondo
World Championships
Gold medal – first place	1995 Manila	Finweight

Huang Chiu-chin (Chinese: 黃秋琴; pinyin: Huáng Qiūqín, born 17 October 1978) is a Taiwanese taekwondo practitioner.

She won a gold medal in finweight at the 1995 World Taekwondo Championships in Manila, after defeating Yang So-hee in the final.
