= Caroline Bartasek =

Australian taekwondo practitioner

Personal information
- Full name: Caroline Bartasek
- Nationality: Australia
- Born: 14 October 1978 (age 48) Melbourne, Victoria, Australia
- Height: 1.75 m (5 ft 9 in)
- Weight: 67 kg (148 lb)

Sport
- Sport: Taekwondo
- Event: 67 kg
- Club: Black Taekwondo
- Coached by: Rod Black

Caroline Bartasek (born 14 October 1978 in Melbourne) is an Australian taekwondo practitioner, who competed in the women's welterweight category. She represented her nation Australia in the 67-kg division at the 2004 Summer Olympics in Athens, and also became a member of Black Taekwondo Club in Melbourne under head coach and master Rod Black.

Bartasek qualified for her Aussie team in the women's welterweight class (67 kg) at the 2004 Summer Olympics in Athens, by placing third and granting a berth from the Asian Olympic Qualifying Tournament in Bangkok, Thailand. She lost her opening match to Guatemala's Heidy Juárez with a score of 7–0. With Juarez losing her next bout to the local favorite Elisavet Mystakidou of Greece, Bartasek denied her chance to compete for an Olympic medal through the repechage.

Caroline is a registered psychologist in Melbourne and is the founder of Performance Edge Psychology which delivers training and presentations to the corporate sector, sporting organisations, athletes and schools.
