= Guatemala at the 1999 Pan American Games =

- IOC code: GUA
- NOC: Comité Olímpico Guatemalteco
- Website: www.cog.org.gt

in Winnipeg 23 July – 8 August 1999
- Medals Ranked 10th: Gold 2 Silver 0 Bronze 2 Total 4

Pan American Games appearances (overview)
- 1951; 1955; 1959; 1963; 1967; 1971; 1975; 1979; 1983; 1987; 1991; 1995; 1999; 2003; 2007; 2011; 2015; 2019; 2023; 2027

Other related appearances
- Independent Athletes Team (2023)

The 13th Pan American Games were held in Winnipeg, Manitoba, Canada from July 23 to August 8, 1999.

== Medals ==
=== Gold ===
===== Shooting =====
- Men's Running Target (10m): Attila Solti

===== Taekwondo =====
- Women's Middleweight (– 67 kg): Heidy Juárez

=== Bronze ===
===== Badminton =====
- Men's Singles: Pedro Yang

===== Weightlifting =====
- Men's Featherweight (– 62 kg): Marvin Jiménez

== See also ==
- Guatemala at the 2000 Summer Olympics
