= José Jesús Márquez =

Spanish taekwondo practitioner

Medal record

Representing Spain

Men's taekwondo

World Championships
Gold medal – first place	1995 Manila	Welterweight
Gold medal – first place	1997 Hong Kong	Welterweight

European Championships
Gold medal – first place	1998 Eindhoven	Welterweight

José Jesús Márquez Sánchez (born May 19th, 1973) is a Spanish Taekwondo athlete.

He is a two-time world champion (1995 and 1997) and five-time straight national welterweight champion (from 1994 to 1998). At the 1995 World Championships in Manila, Márquez won the welterweight (−76 kg) gold medal by defeating Jean Lopez, the eldest Lopez sibling, in the final.
