= Hung Chia-chun =

Taiwanese taekwondo practitioner

Personal information
- Nationality: Taiwanese
- Born: 28 June 1977 (age 49)

Sport
- Sport: Taekwondo
Medal record
Representing Chinese Taipei
Women's taekwondo
World Championships
Silver medal – second place	1997 Hong Kong	Lightweight

Hung Chia-chun (born 28 June 1977) is a Taiwanese taekwondo practitioner. She won a silver medal in lightweight at the 1997 World Taekwondo Championships.
