= Colin Daley =

British taekwondo practitioner

Dr. Colin Daley OLY
Personal information
- Nationality: British
- Born: 12 April 1975 (age 49); London, England

Sport
- Sport: Taekwondo

Dr. Colin Daley OLY (born 12 April 1975) is a British taekwondo practitioner. He competed in the men's +80 kg event at the 2000 Summer Olympics.
