= Daniel Trenton =

Australian taekwondo practitioner

- Born: 1 March 1977 (age 49); Melbourne, Australia
- Nationality: Australian
- Style: Taekwondo
- Teachers: Joon No, Jin Tae Jeong
- Rank: 6th dan (WTF)

Other information
- Occupation: Lawyer & Taekwondo coach
- Notable students: Tina Morgan Ryan Carneli Burak Hasan Safwan Khalil Carmen Marton
- Website: www.betaekwondo.com.au; www.sta.asn.au; www.jaszactrentonlawyers.com.au

Daniel Trenton (born March 1, 1977) is an Australian lawyer and taekwondo coach who represented his country in the sport at international level. He won a silver medal in the heavyweight (+80 kg) division of men's taekwondo at the 2000 Summer Olympics in Sydney. Trenton was Head Coach of Australia's Olympic taekwondo team in 2008.

== Early life ==
Trenton was born in Melbourne, Australia, the son of Greg and Gina Trenton. He grew up in a housing commission in the suburb of Fitzroy North. He began training in taekwondo when his parents bought him a lesson in the martial art for his 11th birthday. He trained in taekwondo in the Victorian Taekwondo Academy. In 1995, he won a scholarship to the Victorian Institute of Sport, which was to become his main training institution. Joon No was one of his taekwondo coaches.

== Competitive taekwondo career ==
Trenton began his international competitive career in the heavyweight division, participating in two tournaments before winning his first medal: a silver medal at the 1996 Asian Championships in Melbourne. He won bronze medals at the 1997 World Cup in Cairo and the 1999 World Championships in Edmonton. Around this period, he was working as a taekwondo instructor, and was studying recreation management at the Victoria University of Technology.

Leading up to the 2000 Summer Olympics, Trenton held over 10 Australian taekwondo championship titles. He made it to the final match of his division but lost 6–2 to Kim Kyong-Hun from South Korea. After winning the silver medal, he accepted an academic scholarship offered by Monash University and finalized his law study to be admitted as a lawyer. Monash University, He also coached the Monash University taekwondo team while in his third year of studies at the institution. In 2001, he was a quarter-finalist at the World Championships, and in 2002 he placed second at the Asian Championships in Amman and the World Cup in Tokyo. He was listed at 180 cm (5 ft 11 in) in height and 86 kg (190 lb) in weight.

Trenton dropped a weight division for his next Olympic Games campaign, entering the welterweight (–80 kg) division. At the 2004 Summer Olympics, Trenton competed but did not make it through the final rounds; he was defeated in a quarter-final match by eventual bronze medalist Yousef Karami from Iran. By the end of his competitive career, Trenton held 16 Australian taekwondo championship titles, and had ten major operations during his most competitive years as an elite athlete. (three shoulder reconstructions and two ankle reconstructions and several others).

== Post-competition career ==
Trenton was appointed Head Coach for Taekwondo Australia in November 2005. In 2006/07, he served on the Board of Management for Taekwondo Australia. In 2007, he was Head Coach of taekwondo for the Australian Institute of Sport, and the following year, he was Head Coach for the Australian Olympic taekwondo team in 2008.

Trenton now contributes to the Global sport of Taekwondo as Director of Sports for Sports Taekwondo Australia and is Director of Be Taekwondo, a martial arts and fitness center in Brunswick East, where he conducts Taekwondo and fitness training for residents located in the areas in which he was raised. He holds the rank of 6th Dan.

Trenton is a global patron for the sport of Taekwondo, having been appointed by the President of the International Olympic Committee as an Athlete Role Model for the Singapore Youth Olympic Games 2010 and by the Asia Olympic Council as Head of Youth Olympic Camp 2013

Trenton has also been appointed to World Taekwondo as Chair of Education & Development and Chair Person of the Juridical Committee for the World Organization.

Trenton is a partner in the law firm Jaszac Trenton Lawyers.

Trenton is also founder and managing director of Lifecycle Technologies, a biotechnology company that develops immune therapy technology to treat disease, enhance recovery and avoid injury.

== See also ==
- Sparring
- World Taekwondo Federation
