= Marcus Thorén =

Swedish taekwondo practitioner

Personal information
- Nationality: Swedish
- Born: 14 April 1971 (age 53); Stockholm, Sweden

Sport
- Sport: Taekwondo

Marcus Thorén (born 14 April 1971) is a Swedish taekwondo practitioner. He competed in the men's +80 kg event at the 2000 Summer Olympics.
