= Vanina Sánchez =

Argentine taekwondo practitioner

Personal information
- Full name: Vanina Paola Sánchez Berón
- Nationality: Argentina
- Born: 13 March 1979 (age 47) San Martín de los Andes, Neuquén, Argentina
- Height: 1.75 m (5 ft 9 in)
- Weight: 62 kg (137 lb)

Sport
- Sport: Taekwondo
- Event: 67 kg
Medal record
Women's taekwondo
Representing Argentina
Pan American Games
| Gold medal – first place | 1995 Mar de Plata | 65 kg |
| Silver medal – second place | 2003 Santo Domingo | 67 kg |
| Bronze medal – third place | 1999 Winnipeg | 57 kg |
World Championships
| Silver medal – second place | 1995 Manila | 60 kg |

Vanina Paola Sánchez Berón (born March 13, 1979, in San Martín de los Andes, Neuquén) is an Argentine taekwondo practitioner. She is a three-time medalist at the Pan American Games, and a silver medalist for the 60 kg division at the 1995 World Taekwondo Championships in Manila, Philippines.

Sanchez made her official debut for the 2004 Summer Olympics in Athens, where she competed in the women's welterweight category (67 kg). She lost the first preliminary match to Philippines' Mary Antoinette Rivero by a superiority decision from the judges, with a score of 10–10.

At the 2008 Summer Olympics in Beijing, Sanchez qualified for the second time in the women's 67 kg class after winning the championship title from the Pan American Qualification Tournament in Cali, Colombia. Sanchez improved her performance from the previous games by defeating Turkey's Sibel Güler in the preliminary round; however, she lost her next match to Canada's Karine Sergerie, who was able to score three points at the end of the game. Because Sergerie advanced further into the final match against South Korea's Hwang Kyung-Seon, Sanchez offered another shot for the bronze medal through the repechage bout, where she was defeated by Australia's Tina Morgan, with a default score of 2–9.
