= Gaël Texier =

Canadian taekwondo athlete (born 1975)

Personal information
- Born: 16 September 1975 (age 50) Beauce, Quebec, Canada
- Education: Masters in computer security at [École polytechnique de Montréal]]
- Years active: 1987–2004
Medal record
Representing Canada
World Championships
Bronze medal – third place	1999 Edmonton	Middleweight
Pan American Championships
Bronze medal – third place	1994 Heredia	Middleweight
Bronze medal – third place	2002 Quito	Middleweight
Pan American Games
Bronze medal – third place	1999 Winnipeg	Middleweight

Gaël Texier (born 16 September 1975) is a Canadian taekwondo athlete and coach. In addition to being the Canadian Women's Taekwondo Champion for five years (1999 and 2001–2004), Texier won bronze medals at the World Championships (1999) and Panamerican Championships (1994 and 2002) and a silver medal at the Francophone World Cup (2002).

== Biography ==
Texier grew up in Saint-Méthode, a small village in Beauce. A Taekwondo school opened there when she was 12, and she took up the sport in hope of being able to break planks of wood with her hands.

=== Academics ===
In 2000 Texier obtained her bachelor's degree in computer science from the Université du Québec à Montréal.

=== Sports career ===
Texier started taekwondo in 1987 in the Asbestos, Quebec region with Martin Dostie under the direction of Daniel Richer. She obtained her black belt in 1989. She continued her training in the Quebec City area under the Sport-Études Taekwondo component while studying at Cégep Garneau, training more than 20 hours a week.

In order to have several high-level training partners, she moved to the Montreal area, then to Toronto to train under the supervision of 4-time world champion In Kyung Kim. She would also travel to annual training camps in South Korea and Europe to practice with other world-class athletes. Texier won medals at several international events such as the World Championship, French World Cup, Pan American Games and Pan American Championship. She also received a Can Fund award to support her training.

Texier was frustrated at the 2003 World Championship in Germany where she said that an inexperienced referee gave points she'd scored to her opponent. She was also upset that Canada was using World Championship results to choose its Olympic team even though weight classes differ. Texier retired from competition in 2004.

=== Coaching ===
In 2007, Texier was coaching a team of Montreal girls who were barred from competition for refusing to remove their hijabs. The Fédération de Tae kwondo du Québec claimed this was for safety reasons despite the hijabs being worn under mandatory helmets and having been accepted in previous and international competitions. Other Muslim athletes boycotted the competition in protest, and Texier said they would have to take the issue to the World Tae Kwon Do Federation.

In 2010 Texier created the Acadé-Kicks centre of martial arts. Later, with Kim In Kyung, she created the program Sport-Études Taekwondo, intended to bring Quebec athletes support and coaching for international competition.

== Awards ==
- 1994 – Bronze, Pan American Championship, Costa Rica
- 1999 – Bronze, World Championship, Edmonton and Alberta, Canada
- 1999 – Bronze, Pan American Games, Winnipeg, Manitoba, Canada
- 2001 – 15th, World Championship, Jeju, Korea
- 2002 – 6th, World Cup Tokyo, Japan
- 2002 – Silver, Francophone World Cup, Paris, France
- 2002 – Bronze, Pan American Championship, Quito, Ecuador
- 2002 – Bronze, Tunisian Open Championship
- 2003 – 10th, World Championship, Garmisch-Partenkirchen

Additionally, Texier was Canadian Women's Taekwondo Champion 1999, 2001, 2002, 2003 and 2004 and a recognized athlete of excellence funded by Sport Canada from 1999 to 2004.
