= Guatemala at the 1991 Pan American Games =

- IOC code: GUA
- NOC: Comité Olímpico Guatemalteco
- Website: www.cog.org.gt

in Havana 8–18 August 1991
- Medals Ranked 16th: Gold 0 Silver 1 Bronze 5 Total 6

Pan American Games appearances (overview)
- 1951; 1955; 1959; 1963; 1967; 1971; 1975; 1979; 1983; 1987; 1991; 1995; 1999; 2003; 2007; 2011; 2015; 2019; 2023

Other related appearances
- Independent Athletes Team (2023)

The 11th Pan American Games were held in Havana, Cuba from August 2 to August 18, 1991.

== Medals ==
=== Silver ===
Shooting

- Ten meter running target - Men: Julio Sandoval

=== Bronze ===
Gymnastics

- Women's Balance Beam: Luisa Portocarrero

== See also ==
- Guatemala at the 1992 Summer Olympics
