= Taekwondo at the 1995 Pan American Games =

This page shows the results of the Taekwondo Competition at the 1995 Pan American Games, held from July 23 to August 8, 1995, in Mar del Plata, Argentina. There were a total number of eight medal events, four for both men and women.

== Men's competition ==
=== Finweight (– 50 kg) ===
RANK	NAME
Gold medal	Carlos Ayala (MEX)
Silver medal	Luis Pinto (ARG)
Bronze medal	Sherland Flores (TRI)
Bronze medal	Reynaldo Ross (CUB)

=== Flyweight (– 54 kg) ===
RANK	NAME
Gold medal	Rubén Palafox (MEX)
Silver medal	Samuel Pejo (USA)
Bronze medal	Manuel Chamorro (ARG)
Bronze medal	Alexei Pedroso (CUB)

=== Bantamweight (– 58 kg) ===
RANK	NAME
Gold medal	Rafael Zúñiga (MEX)
Silver medal	Yosvani Pérez (CUB)
Bronze medal	Pedro Carazo (CRC)
Bronze medal	Fernando Ramírez (ARG)

=== Featherweight (– 64 kg) ===
RANK	NAME
Gold medal	Alejandro Hernando (ARG)
Silver medal	Clayton Barber (USA)
Bronze medal	Agostino dos Santos (CAN)
Bronze medal	Ivens Valladares (CUB)

=== Lightweight (– 70 kg) ===
RANK	NAME
Gold medal	Roberto Abreu (CUB)
Silver medal	Quidio Quero (VEN)
Bronze medal	Sergio Curdena (CHI)
Bronze medal	Sébastian Zapata (ARG)

=== Welterweight (– 76 kg) ===
RANK	NAME
Gold medal	Arturo Utria (CUB)
Silver medal	Mario Bonilla (GUA)
Bronze medal	Regilio Goedhoop (SUR)
Bronze medal	Stephen Goodwin (CAN)

=== Middleweight (– 83 kg) ===
RANK	NAME
Gold medal	Víctor Estrada (MEX)
Silver medal	Alfredo Peterson (PAN)
Bronze medal	Milton Castro (COL)
Bronze medal	Anibal Cintron (PUR)

=== Heavyweight (+ 83 kg) ===
RANK	NAME
Gold medal	Nelson Saenz (CUB)
Silver medal	Lúcio Freitas (BRA)
Bronze medal	Paris Amani (USA)
Bronze medal	Julio Vázquez (DOM)

== Women's competition ==
=== Finweight (– 43 kg) ===
RANK	NAME
Gold medal	Liliana Aguirre (MEX)
Silver medal	Yanet Puerto (CUB)
Bronze medal	Yoom Kyung-Chaing (USA)
Bronze medal	Patricia Santana (ARG)

=== Flyweight (– 47 kg) ===
RANK	NAME
Gold medal	Betsy Ortíz (PUR)
Silver medal	Yunia Cruz (CUB)
Bronze medal	Miranda Hall (CAN)
Bronze medal	Mariela Valenzuela (ARG)

=== Bantamweight (– 51 kg) ===
RANK	NAME
Gold medal	Eliana Pantoja (VEN)
Silver medal	Rosanne Forget (CAN)
Bronze medal	Patricia Mariscal (MEX)
Bronze medal	Cheryl Sankar (TRI)

=== Featherweight (– 55 kg) ===
RANK	NAME
Gold medal	Oly Padron (VEN)
Silver medal	Alejandra Chancalay (ARG)
Bronze medal	Niuris Díaz (CUB)
Bronze medal	Veronica Márquez (MEX)

=== Lightweight (– 60 kg) ===
RANK	NAME
Gold medal	Sonallis Mayan (CUB)
Silver medal	Elizabeth Evans (USA)
Bronze medal	María Bejarano (COL)
Bronze medal	Paola Viveros (PAR)

=== Welterweight (– 65 kg) ===
RANK	NAME
Gold medal	Vanina Sánchez (ARG)
Silver medal	Lazara Zayas (CUB)
Bronze medal	Ohdra Malpica (VEN)
Bronze medal	Diana Martin (USA)

=== Middleweight (– 70 kg) ===
RANK	NAME
Gold medal	Monica del Real (MEX)
Silver medal	Natalia Acciao (ARG)
Bronze medal	Ursula Guimet (PER)
Bronze medal	Marcia King (CAN)

=== Heavyweight (+ 70 kg) ===
RANK	NAME
Gold medal	Adriana Carmona (VEN)
Silver medal	Robin Humphrey (USA)
Bronze medal	Dominique Bosshart (CAN)
Bronze medal	Yudelki Popo (CUB)

== Medal table ==
Place	Nation	Gold medal	Silver medal	Bronze medal	Total
1	Mexico	6	0	2	8
2	Cuba	4	4	5	13
3	Venezuela	3	1	1	5
4	Argentina	2	3	5	10
5	Puerto Rico	1	0	1	2
6	United States	0	4	3	7
7	Canada	0	1	5	6
8	Brazil	0	1	0	1
8	Guatemala	0	1	0	1
8	Panama	0	1	0	1
11	Colombia	0	0	2	2
11	Trinidad and Tobago	0	0	2	2
13	Chile	0	0	1	1
13	Costa Rica	0	0	1	1
13	Dominican Republic	0	0	1	1
13	Paraguay	0	0	1	1
13	Peru	0	0	1	1
13	Suriname	0	0	1	1
Total		16	16	32	64
