= Kay Poe =

American taekwondo practitioner

Personal information
- Born: 15 May 1982 (age 44) Houston, Texas U.S.

Sport
- Sport: Taekwondo
Medal record
Representing United States
Women's taekwondo
World Championships
Bronze medal – third place	1997 Hong Kong	Finweight
Pan American Games
Silver medal – second place	1999 Winnipeg	Flyweight

Kay Poe (born 15 May 1982) is an American taekwondo practitioner from Houston. She is a two time Olympian. She competed at the 2000 Summer Olympics in Sydney. She won a silver medal in flyweight at the 1999 Pan American Games in Winnipeg, Canada.
