= Michelle Thompson (taekwondo) =

American taekwondo practitioner

Michelle Thompson was a member of the US national taekwondo team. She won the 1993 and 1994 NCTA bantamweight championships. She represented the U.S. at the 1995 world championships in the Philippines, earning a silver medal. Currently employed as a flight attendant, Michelle participated in the 2020 Netflix original show titled “The Floor is Lava,” being the first person on her team to complete the course.
