= Park Sun-mi =

South Korean taekwondo practitioner

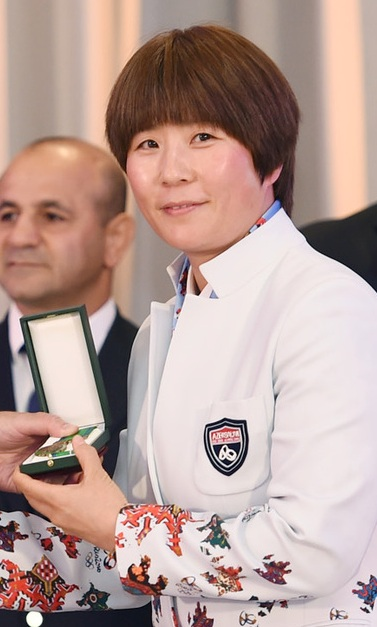

Personal information
- Nationality: South Korean
- Born: 22 November 1972 (age 53) South Korea
- Education: Sangmyung University

Sport
- Country: South Korea
- Sport: Taekwondo
Medal record
Women's taekwondo
Representing South Korea
World Championships
Silver medal – second place	1995 Manila	Middleweight
Asian Championships
Gold medal – first place	1994 Manila	Middleweight

Korean name
- Hangul: 박선미
- RR: Bak Seonmi
- MR: Pak Sŏnmi

Park Sun-mi (born November 22, 1972) is a South Korean taekwondo athlete and coach.

Park Sun-mi won a gold medal at the 1994 Asian Taekwondo Championships in Manila and silver medal at the 1995 World Taekwondo Championships in Manila.

Since the beginning of 2015 she is a head coach of Azerbaijani national female taekwondo team.
