= Verina Wihongi =

New Zealand taekwondo practitioner

Verina Rosiland Wihongi is a taekwando practitioner from New Zealand.

Wihongi has a 3rd degree black belt in taekwondo. She was the first woman to represent New Zealand in taekwondo at the 2004 Summer Olympics at Athens. She qualified for the Olympics after winning the selection tournament in Auckland and the Asian Taekwondo Games in Bangkok.

== Personal life ==
She works as a Dairy Herd Manager in Balclutha with her partner, Ngatai.
