= Natalia Ivanova (taekwondo) =

Russian taekwondo practitioner

Personal information
- Nationality: Russian
- Born: 1 September 1971 (age 54)

Sport
- Sport: Taekwondo
Medal record
Representing Russia
Women's taekwondo
Olympic Games
Silver medal – second place	2000 Sydney	+67 kg
World Championships
Silver medal – second place	1997 Hong Kong	Heavyweight
European Championships
Gold medal – first place	1996 Helsinki	+70 kg
Gold medal – first place	1998 Eindhoven	-72 kg
Gold medal – first place	2002 Samsun	-72 kg

Natalia Nikolayevna Ivanova (Russian: Наталья Николаевна Иванова; born 1 September 1971) is a Russian taekwondo practitioner and Olympic medalist. She competed at the 2000 Summer Olympics in Sydney where she received a silver medal in the +67 kg class. She won a silver medal in heavyweight at the 1997 World Taekwondo Championships in Hong Kong, after defeating Chiu Meng-jen in the semifinal, and being defeated by Jung Myoung-sook in the final. She also competed at the 1995, 1999, 2001 and 2003 World Taekwondo Championships. She won gold medals at the 1996, 1998 and 2002 European Taekwondo Championships.
