= Barbara Kunkel =

American taekwondo practitioner

Personal information
- Nationality: American
- Born: 17 September 1969 (age 56)

Sport
- Sport: Taekwondo
Medal record
Representing the United States
Women's taekwondo
Pan American Games
Bronze medal – third place	1999 Winnipeg	Middleweight

Barbara Kunkel (born 17 September 1969) is an American taekwondo practitioner. She competed at the 2000 Summer Olympics in Sydney. She won a bronze medal in middleweight at the 1999 Pan American Games.
