= Carlos Delgado (taekwondo) =

Nicaraguan taekwondo practitioner

Personal information
- Nationality: Nicaraguan
- Born: 5 October 1970 (age 55)

Sport
- Sport: Taekwondo

Carlos Delgado (born 5 October 1970) is a Nicaraguan taekwondo practitioner. He competed in the men's +80 kg event at the 2000 Summer Olympics.
