= Luña del Mar Aguiliú =

Puerto Rican synchronized swimmer (born 1981)

Personal information
- Nationality: Puerto Rico
- Born: 16 November 1981 (age 44) San Juan, Puerto Rico
- Height: 1.70 m (5 ft 7 in)
- Weight: 67 kg (148 lb)

Sport
- Sport: Synchronised swimming

Luña del Mar Aguiliú Ribera (born 16 November 1981) is a Puerto Rican synchronized swimmer. She competed in the 2004 Summer Olympics.
