= Roxane Forget =

Canadian taekwondo practitioner

Personal information
- Nationality: Canadian
- Born: January 17, 1972 (age 54)

Sport
- Sport: Taekwondo

Achievements and titles
- World finals: 6 (1993–)
Medal record
Representing Canada
Women's taekwondo
World Championships
Silver medal – second place	1997 Hong Kong	Bantamweight
Pan American Games
Gold medal – first place	1999 Winnipeg	-49 kg
Silver medal – second place	1995 Mar del Plata	-51 kg
Pan American Championships
Silver medal – second place	2000 Oranjestad	-51 kg
Bronze medal – third place	1988 Lima	-51 kg

Roxane Forget (born 17 January 1972) is a Canadian taekwondo practitioner.

She won a silver medal in bantamweight at the 1997 World Taekwondo Championships in Hong Kong, after being defeated by Hwang Eun-suk in the final. She won a gold medal at the 1999 Pan American Games in Winnipeg.
