= Guatemala at the 1995 Pan American Games =

- IOC code: GUA
- NOC: Comité Olímpico Guatemalteco
- Website: www.cog.org.gt

in Mar del Plata 11–26 March 1995
- Medals Ranked 12th: Gold 1 Silver 1 Bronze 6 Total 8

Pan American Games appearances (overview)
- 1951; 1955; 1959; 1963; 1967; 1971; 1975; 1979; 1983; 1987; 1991; 1995; 1999; 2003; 2007; 2011; 2015; 2019; 2023

Other related appearances
- Independent Athletes Team (2023)

The 12th Pan American Games were held in Mar del Plata, Argentina from March 11 to March 25, 1995.

== Medals ==
=== Gold ===
===== Shooting =====
- Men's Running Target (10m): Attila Solti

=== Silver ===
===== Taekwondo =====
- Men's Welterweight (– 76 kg): Mario Bonilla

=== Bronze ===
===== Athletics =====
- Men's 20 km Road Walk: Julio René Martínez
- Men's 50 km Road Walk: Julio César Urías

===== Boxing =====
- Men's Welterweight (– 67 kg): Tomás Leyva

== See also ==
- Guatemala at the 1996 Summer Olympics
