= Guatemala at the Pan American Games =

- IOC code: GUA
- NOC: Comité Olímpico Guatemalteco
- Website: www.cog.org.gt
- Medals Ranked 14th: Gold 20 Silver 15 Bronze 40 Total 75

Pan American Games appearances (overview)
- 1951; 1955; 1959; 1963; 1967; 1971; 1975; 1979; 1983; 1987; 1991; 1995; 1999; 2003; 2007; 2011; 2015; 2019; 2023

Other related appearances
- Independent Athletes Team (2023)

Guatemala at the Pan American Games.Guatemala has competed in all the Pan American Games except in 2023 during which they were suspended by the IOC due to their government interference in the working of the Guatemalan Olympic Committee.

== Pan American Games ==
=== Medals by games ===
Year	Host city	Gold	Silver	Bronze	Total
1951	Buenos Aires	0	0	3	3
1955	Mexico City	1	0	1	2
1959	Chicago	0	0	1	1
1963	São Paulo	0	2	0	2
1967	Winnipeg	0	0	0	0
1971	Cali	1	0	0	1
1975	Mexico City	0	0	1	1
1979	San Juan	0	0	0	0
1983	Caracas	0	0	1	1
1987	Indianapolis	0	0	2	2
1991	Havana	0	1	4	5
1995	Mar del Plata	1	1	6	8
1999	Winnipeg	2	1	1	4
2003	Santo Domingo	0	3	9	12
2007	Rio de Janeiro	2	3	2	7
2011	Guadalajara	7	3	5	15
2015	Toronto	6	1	3	10
2019	Lima	2	9	8	19
2023	Santiago	Suspended			
2027	Lima	Future event			
Total		22	24	48	94

== Junior Pan American Games ==
=== Medals by games ===
Games	Gold	Silver	Bronze	Total	Rank
(Colombia) 2021 Cali-Valle	1	5	10	16	18th
(Paraguay) 2025 Asunción	7	3	4	14	11th
Total	8	8	14	30	14th
