= Luo Wei (taekwondo) =

Chinese Taekwondo practitioner

Medal record

Women's taekwondo

Representing China

Olympic Games
Gold medal – first place	2004 Athens	67 kg

World Championships
Gold medal – first place	2003 Garmisch	Middleweight
Bronze medal – third place	2007 Beijing	Middleweight

Asian Games
Gold medal – first place	2006 Doha	Middleweight
Bronze medal – third place	2002 Busan	Welterweight

Luo Wei (simplified Chinese: 罗微; traditional Chinese: 羅微; pinyin: Luó Wēi; born May 23, 1983, in Beijing) is a female Chinese taekwondo practitioner who competed at the 2004 Summer Olympics. She won the gold medal in the women's under 67 kg taekwondo competition.

== Career ==
In 2002, after being selected for the national team, she won the 72kg championship at the National Taekwondo Championships; in the same year, she won the bronze medal in the 67kg event at the Busan Asian Games.

In August 2004, 21-year-old Luo Wei won the 29th gold medal for the Chinese delegation in the women's 67kg taekwondo finals at the Athens Olympics. gold medal and became China's second Olympic taekwondo champion after Chen Zhong.
