= Adriana Carmona =

Venezuelan taekwondo practitioner

Adriana Carmona OLY
Personal information
- Born: December 3, 1972 (age 53) Puerto La Cruz, Venezuela
Medal record
Women's taekwondo
Representing Venezuela
Olympic Games
Bronze medal – third place	2004 Athens	+67 kg
Olympic Games (demonstration)
Bronze medal – third place	1992 Barcelona	Heavyweight
World Championships
Silver medal – second place	1993 New York	Heavyweight
Pan American Games
Gold medal – first place	1995 Mar del Plata	Heavyweight
Silver medal – second place	1999 Winnipeg	+67 kg
Silver medal – second place	2003 Santo Domingo	+67 kg

Adriana Carmona (born December 3, 1972) is a Venezuelan taekwondo practitioner and Olympic medalist.

== Olympic Games ==
She competed at the 2004 Summer Olympics in Athens, where she received a bronze medal in the +67 kg class.

She participated at the 1992 Summer Olympics in Barcelona where taekwondo was still a demonstration sport, and reached the semi finals winning a bronze medal in Woman's +70 kg.

She reached the semi-finals at the 2000 Summer Olympics in Sydney.

== International championships ==
Carmona won a gold medal at the 1995 Pan American Games in Mar del Plata, and received a silver medal at the 1999 Pan American Games in Winnipeg.
