= Ireane Ruíz =

Spanish taekwondo practitioner

Personal information
- Nationality: Spanish
- Born: 2 April 1973 (age 53) Logroño, La Rioja, Spain

Sport
- Sport: Taekwondo
Medal record
Representing Spain
Women's taekwondo
World Championships
Gold medal – first place	1995 Manila	Middleweight
Bronze medal – third place	1997 Hong Kong	Middleweight

Ireane Ruíz (born 2 April 1973) is a Spanish taekwondo practitioner. She was born in Logroño, La Rioja. She competed at the 2000 Summer Olympics in Sydney. She won a gold medal in middleweight at the 1995 World Taekwondo Championships in Manila, and a bronze medal at the 1997 World Taekwondo Championships in Hong Kong.
