= Luis Noguera =

Venezuelan taekwondo practitioner

Personal information
- Full name: Luis Alberto Noguera Urquia
- Nationality: Venezuela
- Born: 12 October 1973 (age 53) Caracas, Venezuela
- Height: 1.82 m (5 ft 11 1/2 in)
- Weight: 84 kg (185 lb)

Sport
- Sport: Taekwondo
- Event: +80 kg
Medal record
Men's taekwondo
Representing Venezuela
Pan American Games
Gold medal – first place	1999 Winnipeg	+80 kg
World Championships
Bronze medal – third place	1993 New York City	83 kg

Luis Alberto Noguera Urquia (born October 12, 1973 in Caracas) is a Venezuelan taekwondo practitioner, who competed in the men's heavyweight category. He retrieved a bronze medal in the 83-kg division at the 1993 World Taekwondo Championships in New York City, New York, United States, clinched the gold at the 1999 Pan American Games in Winnipeg, Manitoba, Canada, and represented his nation Venezuela at the 2004 Summer Olympics.

Noguera emerged himself on Venezuela's sporting fame at the 1999 Pan American Games in Winnipeg, Manitoba, Canada, where he edged Mexico's Rodrigo Martínez for the gold medal in the men's over-80 kg division.

At the 2004 Summer Olympics in Athens, Noguera qualified for the Venezuelan squad in the men's heavyweight class (+80 kg), by placing third and granting a berth from the World Olympic Qualifying Tournament in Paris, France. He crashed out early in the opening round by a marginal 5–8 decision to a lanky 6-foot-6 Moroccan fighter Abdelkader Zrouri. Following Zrouri's immediate defeat to Greek crowd favorite Alexandros Nikolaidis in the quarterfinals, Noguera denied his chance to proceed into the repechage bracket for the Olympic bronze medal.
