= Kim Kyong-hun =

South Korean taekwondoin (born 1975)

Medal record

Men's taekwondo

Representing South Korea

Olympic Games
| Gold medal – first place | 2000 Sydney | +80 kg |

World Championships
| Bronze medal – third place | 2001 Jeju | Middleweight |
| Bronze medal – third place | 1997 Hong Kong | Welterweight |

Asian Games
| Gold medal – first place | 2002 Busan | Middleweight |

Asian Championships
| Gold medal – first place | 1996 Melbourne | Welterweight |

Kim Kyong-Hun (born July 15, 1975) is a South Korean taekwondo practitioner and Olympic champion. He competed at the 2000 Summer Olympics in Sydney, where he won the gold medal in the heavyweight competition.
