= Ineabelle Díaz =

Puerto Rican taekwondo practitioner

Personal information
- Full name: Ineabelle Díaz Santana
- Nationality: Puerto Rican
- Born: 4 January 1974 (age 52) Río Piedras, Puerto Rico
- Height: 1.73 m (5 ft 8 in)
- Weight: 67 kg (148 lb)

Sport
- Sport: Taekwondo
- Event: 67 kg
Medal record
Women's taekwondo
Representing Puerto Rico
Pan American Games
Bronze medal – third place	1999 Winnipeg	67 kg
Central American and Caribbean Games
Gold medal – first place	2006 Cartagena	+72 kg
Gold medal – first place	2002 El Salvador	+72 kg
Silver medal – second place	1998 Maracaibo	67+ kg
Gold medal – first place	1993 Ponce	67+ kg
Gold medal – first place	1990 Mexico City	67+ kg
World Championships
Silver medal – second place	2005 Madrid	+72 kg
Bronze medal – third place	1993 New York	60 kg

Ineabelle Díaz Santana (born January 4, 1974, in Río Piedras) is a Puerto Rican taekwondo practitioner, who competed in the women's welterweight category. She picked up a total of ten medals in her career, including two from the World Taekwondo Championships and a bronze from the 1999 Pan American Games in Winnipeg, Manitoba, Canada. Diaz also competed for Puerto Rico in a demonstration event at the 1992 Summer Olympics in Barcelona, and later attained a fifth-place finish in the 67-kg division at the 2004 Summer Olympics, narrowly missing out the nation's first Olympic medal since 1996.

Diaz made her official debut at the 1992 Summer Olympics in Barcelona, where she trailed behind South Korea's Jeung Eun-ok 1–4 in the 60-kg class during an exhibition taekwondo event. In 1993, she won a bronze medal in the same division at the World Championships in New York City, before suddenly retiring from the sport. Six years later, she came out from an early retirement to pick up another bronze in the 63-kg class at the 1999 Pan American Games in Winnipeg, Manitoba, Canada, but missed her bid for the 2000 Summer Olympics, where taekwondo officially became part of the sporting program.

At the 2004 Summer Olympics in Athens, Diaz returned from a 12-year absence to compete for her Puerto Rican squad in the women's welterweight class (67 kg). Earlier in the process, she sealed a first-place victory over Guatemala's Heidy Juárez and guaranteed a spot on the Puerto Rico Olympic team at the Pan American Olympic Qualifying Tournament in Querétaro, Mexico. She first triumphed by a 4–4 judging decision over Morocco's Mouna Benabderrassoul, before being downed by China's Luo Wei in the semifinals with a score of 3–5. Diaz sought for Puerto Rico's first Olympic medal at these Games, but slipped it away in a 2–5 defeat to Juarez in the repechage rounds, relegating her to fifth.

Rising from Puerto Rico's top Olympic finish in Athens, Diaz put her retirement plans on hold, as she finished behind South Korea's Shin Kyung-hyeon in the heavyweight division at the 2005 World Taekwondo Championships in Madrid, Spain, and then crushed Mexico's Sulayyil Madrigal to earn her last of four golds at the 2006 Central American and Caribbean Games in Cartagena, Colombia.
