= Milton Castro (taekwondo) =

Colombian taekwondo practitioner

Personal information
- Nationality: Colombian
- Born: 29 January 1976 (age 50) Barranquilla, Colombia

Sport
- Sport: Taekwondo
Medal record
Representing Colombia
Men's taekwondo
Pan American Games
| Bronze medal – third place | 1995 Mar del Plata | 83 kg |
Central American and Caribbean Games
| Silver medal – second place | 1998 Maracaibo | Heavyweight |

Milton Eliécer Castro Herrera (born 29 January 1976) is a Colombian taekwondo practitioner. He competed in the men's +80 kg event at the 2000 Summer Olympics.
