= Jean López (taekwondo) =

American Taekwondo athlete, coach

Jean López (born August 31, 1973, in Texas, U.S.) is an American taekwondo athlete and coach.

== Biography ==
López is a 1991 graduate of Kempner High School and was a four-time member of the U.S. National Taekwondo Team. In 1995, López won a silver medal at the 1995 Taekwondo World Championships.

López coached the U.S. Olympic Taekwondo team in the 2004, 2008, and 2012 Olympic Games.

On April 3, 2018, López was found guilty by the United States Center for SafeSport of sexual misconduct involving a minor and was banned from USA Taekwondo. SafeSport found that he had assaulted Mandy Meloon, Heidi Gilbert, and a third woman. The ban was overturned by an arbitrator in January 2019.
