= Nelson Sáenz =

Cuban taekwondo practitioner

Personal information
- Nationality: Cuban
- Born: 18 November 1965 (age 60)

Sport
- Sport: Taekwondo
Medal record
Representing Cuba
Pan American Games
Gold medal – first place	1991 Havana	Heavyweight
Gold medal – first place	1995 Mar del Plata	Heavyweight
Central American and Caribbean Games
Gold medal – first place	1998 Maracaibo	Heavyweight

Nelson Sáenz Miller (born 18 November 1965) is a Cuban taekwondo practitioner. He competed in the men's +80 kg event at the 2000 Summer Olympics.
