= Heidy Juárez =

Guatemalan taekwondo practitioner

Heidy Pinto
Personal information
- Full name: Heidy Pinto
- Born: 14 May 1977 (age 49) Guatemala City, Guatemala
- Height: 1.75 m (5 ft 9 in)
- Weight: 67 kg (148 lb)

Sport
- Sport: Taekwondo
- Event: 67 kg
Medal record
Women's taekwondo
Representing Guatemala
Pan American Games
Gold medal – first place	1999 Winnipeg	67 kg
Silver medal – second place	2007 Rio de Janeiro	67 kg
World Championships
Bronze medal – third place	1995 Manila	70 kg

Heidy Marleny Juárez Guzmán (born May 14, 1977, in Los Angeles) is a Guatemalan taekwondo practitioner, who competed in the women's welterweight category. She picked up a total of eight medals in her career, including a silver from the 2007 Pan American Games in Rio de Janeiro, Brazil, and a bronze from the 1995 World Taekwondo Championships in Manila, Philippines, and finished fourth in the 67-kg division at the 2004 Summer Olympics, narrowly missing a chance to become Guatemala's first ever Olympic medalist in history.

Juarez qualified for the Guatemalan squad in the women's welterweight class (67 kg) at the 2004 Summer Olympics in Athens, by placing second behind Puerto Rico's Ineabelle Díaz and granting a berth from the Pan American Olympic Qualifying Tournament in Querétaro, Mexico. She opened her match with a superb 7–0 victory over Australia's Caroline Bartasek, before dropping a 4–6 decision to the local favorite Elisavet Mystakidou of Greece by the powerful commotion of the home crowd in the quarterfinals. In the repechage rounds, Juarez came strong from her premature exit to edge New Zealand's Verina Wihongi 4–1, and then yielded her revenge over Puerto Rican fighter Ineabelle Díaz for a 5–2 victory to mount a chance for Guatemala's first ever Olympic medal, but she failed to salvage it in a 2–5 defeat to South Korea's Hwang Kyung-seon.

At the 2007 Pan American Games in Rio de Janeiro, Brazil, Juarez improved her feat from a fourth-place Olympic finish by picking up a silver medal in the women's 67-kg division, losing the final 2–8 to Canada's Karine Sergerie.
