= Myriam Baverel =

French taekwondo practitioner

Medal record

Representing France

Women's taekwondo

Olympic Games
Silver medal – second place	2004 Athens	+67 kg

World Championships
Silver medal – second place	2003 Garmisch Partenkirchen	Middleweight

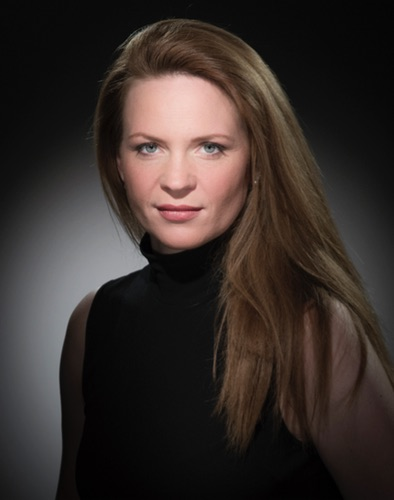

Myriam Baverel (born 14 January 1981) is a French taekwondo practitioner and Olympic medalist. She competed at the 2004 Summer Olympics in Athens, where she received a silver medal in the +67 kg class. She reached the quarterfinals at the 2000 Summer Olympics in Sydney.

Baverel received a silver medal at the 2003 World Taekwondo Championships in Garmisch Partenkirchen. Baverel announced in 2012 that she was pregnant with her first child.
