= Dominique Bosshart =

Canadian taekwondo practitioner

Personal information
- Born: October 7, 1977 (age 48) Morges, Vaud, Switzerland
Medal record
Women's taekwondo
Representing Canada
Olympic Games
| Bronze medal – third place | 2000 Sydney | Heavyweight |
World Championships
| Silver medal – second place | 1999 Edmonton | Heavyweight |
Pan American Games
| Bronze medal – third place | 1995 Mar del Plata | Heavyweight |
| Bronze medal – third place | 1999 Winnipeg | Heavyweight |

Dominique Bosshart (born October 7, 1977) is a Canadian taekwondo athlete.

She was Canada's only taekwondo competitor during the 2000 Summer Olympics in Sydney, where she won a bronze medal in the heavyweight division (+ 67 kg). She competed in the 2004 Summer Olympics in Athens but did not medal.

Bosshart began studying taekwondo at age 13, at the urging of her brother. At age 15, she moved from living with her parents in Landmark, Manitoba to living on her own in Winnipeg in order to train with Master Joo Kang at Kang's Taekwondo Academy.
