= Sonallis Mayan =

Cuban taekwondo practitioner

Personal information
- Nationality: Cuban
- Born: 12 February 1973 (age 53)

Sport
- Sport: Taekwondo
Medal record
Representing Cuba
Women's taekwondo
Pan American Games
| Gold medal – first place | 1995 Mar del Plata | Lightweight |
| Gold medal – first place | 1999 Winnipeg | Heavyweight |

Sonallis Mayan (born 12 February 1973) is a Cuban taekwondo practitioner. She competed at the 2000 Summer Olympics in Sydney.

She won a gold medal in heavyweight at the 1999 Pan American Games.
