= Toni Rivero =

Filipino taekwondo practitioner

Personal information
- Full name: Mary Antoinette Rivero
- Born: February 26, 1988 (age 38) Makati, Philippines
Medal record
Women's taekwondo
Representing the Philippines
Asian Championships
Silver medal – second place	2008 Henan	Welterweight
Bronze medal – third place	2004 Seongnam	Welterweight
Asian Games
Silver medal – second place	2006 Doha	Welterweight
Southeast Asian Games
Gold medal – first place	2003 Vietnam	Welterweight
Gold medal – first place	2005 Philippines	Lightweight
Gold medal – first place	2009 Laos	Welterweight
Silver medal – second place	2007 Thailand	Welterweight

Mary Antoinette Rivero (born February 26, 1988), also known as Toni Rivero, is a taekwondo practitioner from the Philippines. She represented the country in the 2004 and 2008 Summer Olympics. Rivero was born in Makati.

== See also ==
- Philippines at the 2008 Summer Olympics
