= Mouna Benabderrassoul =

Moroccan taekwondo practitioner

Medal record

Representing Morocco

Women's taekwondo

World Championships
Bronze medal – third place	2001 Jeju	Lightweight

Mouna Benabderrassoul (born May 12, 1984) is a Moroccan taekwondo athlete. She won the bronze medal in lightweight (-63 kg) at the 2001 World Taekwondo Championships in Jeju City, South Korea.

Benabderrassoul represented her country in the -67 kg class at the 2008 Beijing Olympics.
