= Mounia Bourguigue =

Moroccan taekwondo practitioner

Medal record

Representing Morocco

Women's taekwondo

World Championships
Silver medal – second place	1997 Hong Kong	70 kg
Bronze medal – third place	2003 Germany	72 kg

Mounia Bourguigue (born January 21, 1975) is a taekwondo practitioner from Morocco. She competed at the 2000 Summer Olympics in Sydney, where she placed 5th, and at the 2004 Summer Olympics in Athens, where she placed 11th. She won medals at the World Championships in 1997 and in 2003.
