= List of World Championships medalists in taekwondo (women) =

This is a List of World Championships medalists in women's taekwondo.

== Finweight ==
- −43 kg: 1987–1997
- −47 kg: 1999–2007
- −46 kg: 2009–

Championships	Gold	Silver	Bronze
1987 Barcelona	Jang Eu-suk (KOR)	Mónica Torres (MEX)	Rosa Moreno (ESP)
1987 Barcelona	Jang Eu-suk (KOR)	Mónica Torres (MEX)	Chin Yu-fang (TPE)
1989 Seoul	Chin Yu-fang (TPE)	Mónica Torres (MEX)	Kim Jee-hyang (KOR)
1989 Seoul	Chin Yu-fang (TPE)	Mónica Torres (MEX)	Sita Kumari Rai (NEP)
1991 Athens	Elisabet Delgado (ESP)	Gülnur Yerlisu (TUR)	Kim Jin-seong (KOR)
1991 Athens	Elisabet Delgado (ESP)	Gülnur Yerlisu (TUR)	Wu Shan-chen (TPE)
1993 New York City	Isabel Cruzado (ESP)	Rahmi Kurnia (INA)	Gonca Güler (TUR)
1993 New York City	Isabel Cruzado (ESP)	Rahmi Kurnia (INA)	Vicki Slane (USA)
1995 Manila	Huang Chiu-chin (TPE)	Yang So-hee (KOR)	Coral Falco (ESP)
1995 Manila	Huang Chiu-chin (TPE)	Yang So-hee (KOR)	Cristina Atzeni (ITA)
1997 Hong Kong	Yang So-hee (KOR)	Li Huang (CHN)	Thy Vy Sok (AUS)
1997 Hong Kong	Yang So-hee (KOR)	Li Huang (CHN)	Kay Poe (USA)
1999 Edmonton	Belén Asensio (ESP)	Yoon Song-hee (KOR)	France Pouzoulet (FRA)
1999 Edmonton	Belén Asensio (ESP)	Yoon Song-hee (KOR)	Kadriye Selimoğlu (TUR)
2001 Jeju	Kadriye Selimoğlu (TUR)	Kim Soo-yang (KOR)	Kong Fantao (CHN)
2001 Jeju	Kadriye Selimoğlu (TUR)	Kim Soo-yang (KOR)	Dalia Contreras (VEN)
2003 Garmisch-P.	Brigitte Yagüe (ESP)	Wang Ying (CHN)	Thucuc Pham (GER)
2003 Garmisch-P.	Brigitte Yagüe (ESP)	Wang Ying (CHN)	Dalia Contreras (VEN)
2005 Madrid	Belén Asensio (ESP)	Yoo Eun-young (KOR)	Sümeyye Güleç (GER)
2005 Madrid	Belén Asensio (ESP)	Yoo Eun-young (KOR)	Mandy Meloon (USA)
2007 Beijing	Wu Jingyu (CHN)	Yaowapa Boorapolchai (THA)	Yang Shu-chun (TPE)
2007 Beijing	Wu Jingyu (CHN)	Yaowapa Boorapolchai (THA)	Charlotte Craig (USA)
2009 Copenhagen	Park Hyo-ji (KOR)	Zoraida Santiago (PUR)	Yvette Yong (CAN)
2009 Copenhagen	Park Hyo-ji (KOR)	Zoraida Santiago (PUR)	Buttree Puedpong (THA)
2011 Gyeongju	Kim So-hui (KOR)	Li Zhaoyi (CHN)	Sümeyye Manz (GER)
2011 Gyeongju	Kim So-hui (KOR)	Li Zhaoyi (CHN)	Rukiye Yıldırım (TUR)
2013 Puebla	Kim So-hui (KOR)	Anastasia Valueva (RUS)	Ren Dandan (CHN)
2013 Puebla	Kim So-hui (KOR)	Anastasia Valueva (RUS)	Fadia Farhani (TUN)
2015 Chelyabinsk	Panipak Wongpattanakit (THA)	Iryna Romoldanova (UKR)	Iris Sing (BRA)
2015 Chelyabinsk	Panipak Wongpattanakit (THA)	Iryna Romoldanova (UKR)	Lin Wan-ting (TPE)
2017 Muju	Sim Jae-young (KOR)	Trương Thị Kim Tuyền (VIE)	Andrea Ramírez (COL)
2017 Muju	Sim Jae-young (KOR)	Trương Thị Kim Tuyền (VIE)	Napaporn Charanawat (THA)
2019 Manchester	Sim Jae-young (KOR)	Mahla Momenzadeh (IRI)	Tan Xueqin (CHN)
2019 Manchester	Sim Jae-young (KOR)	Mahla Momenzadeh (IRI)	Julanan Khantikulanon (THA)
2022 Guadalajara	Lena Stojković (CRO)	Rukiye Yıldırım (TUR)	Andrea Ramírez (COL)
2022 Guadalajara	Lena Stojković (CRO)	Rukiye Yıldırım (TUR)	Huang Ying-hsuan (TPE)
2023 Baku	Lena Stojković (CRO)	Kamonchanok Seeken (THA)	Wang Xiaolu (CHN)
2023 Baku	Lena Stojković (CRO)	Kamonchanok Seeken (THA)	Ruka Okamoto (JPN)
2025 Wuxi	Emine Göğebakan (TUR)	Milana Bekulova (AIN)	Wang Shiyi (CHN)
2025 Wuxi	Emine Göğebakan (TUR)	Milana Bekulova (AIN)	Aidana Kumartayeva (KAZ)

== Flyweight ==
- −47 kg: 1987–1997
- −51 kg: 1999–2007
- −49 kg: 2009–

Championships	Gold	Silver	Bronze
1987 Barcelona	Pai Yun-yao (TPE)	Lee Young (KOR)	Antonia Cayetano (ESP)
1987 Barcelona	Pai Yun-yao (TPE)	Lee Young (KOR)	Ginean Hatter (USA)
1989 Seoul	Won Sun-jin (KOR)	Pai Yun-yao (TPE)	Anita Falieros (AUS)
1989 Seoul	Won Sun-jin (KOR)	Pai Yun-yao (TPE)	Mayumi Pejo (USA)
1991 Athens	Arzu Tan (TUR)	Anita van der Pas (NED)	Mariela Valenzuela (ARG)
1991 Athens	Arzu Tan (TUR)	Anita van der Pas (NED)	Tang Hui-wen (TPE)
1993 New York City	You Su-mi (KOR)	Águeda Pérez (MEX)	Inas Anis (EGY)
1993 New York City	You Su-mi (KOR)	Águeda Pérez (MEX)	Gülnur Yerlisu (TUR)
1995 Manila	Hamide Bıkçın (TUR)	Monika Sprengel (GER)	Betsy Ortiz (PUR)
1995 Manila	Hamide Bıkçın (TUR)	Monika Sprengel (GER)	Trần Thị Mỹ Linh (VIE)
1997 Hong Kong	Chi Shu-ju (TPE)	Yoon Song-hee (KOR)	Kylie Treadwell (AUS)
1997 Hong Kong	Chi Shu-ju (TPE)	Yoon Song-hee (KOR)	Mandy Meloon (USA)
1999 Edmonton	Chi Shu-ju (TPE)	Shim Hye-young (KOR)	Yuan Guiru (CHN)
1999 Edmonton	Chi Shu-ju (TPE)	Shim Hye-young (KOR)	Jennifer Delgado (ESP)
2001 Jeju	Lee Hye-young (KOR)	Brigitte Yagüe (ESP)	Magda Seirekidou (GRE)
2001 Jeju	Lee Hye-young (KOR)	Brigitte Yagüe (ESP)	Huang Chia-chin (TPE)
2003 Garmisch-P.	Lee Ji-hye (KOR)	Yanelis Labrada (CUB)	Yaowapa Boorapolchai (THA)
2003 Garmisch-P.	Lee Ji-hye (KOR)	Yanelis Labrada (CUB)	Elisha Voren (USA)
2005 Madrid	Wang Ying (CHN)	Brigitte Yagüe (ESP)	Nevena Lukic (AUT)
2005 Madrid	Wang Ying (CHN)	Brigitte Yagüe (ESP)	Daynellis Montejo (CUB)
2007 Beijing	Brigitte Yagüe (ESP)	Ana Zaninović (CRO)	Yajaira Peguero (DOM)
2007 Beijing	Brigitte Yagüe (ESP)	Ana Zaninović (CRO)	Nazgul Tazhigulova (KAZ)
2009 Copenhagen	Brigitte Yagüe (ESP)	Anna Soboleva (RUS)	Wu Jingyu (CHN)
2009 Copenhagen	Brigitte Yagüe (ESP)	Anna Soboleva (RUS)	Yasmina Aziez (FRA)
2011 Gyeongju	Wu Jingyu (CHN)	Yang Shu-chun (TPE)	Brigitte Yagüe (ESP)
2011 Gyeongju	Wu Jingyu (CHN)	Yang Shu-chun (TPE)	Sanaa Atabrour (MAR)
2013 Puebla	Chanatip Sonkham (THA)	Dana Haidar (JOR)	Lucija Zaninović (CRO)
2013 Puebla	Chanatip Sonkham (THA)	Dana Haidar (JOR)	Yania Aguirre (CUB)
2015 Chelyabinsk	Ha Min-ah (KOR)	Wu Jingyu (CHN)	Svetlana Igumenova (RUS)
2015 Chelyabinsk	Ha Min-ah (KOR)	Wu Jingyu (CHN)	Tijana Bogdanović (SRB)
2017 Muju	Vanja Stanković (SRB)	Panipak Wongpattanakit (THA)	Wenren Yuntao (CHN)
2017 Muju	Vanja Stanković (SRB)	Panipak Wongpattanakit (THA)	Kristina Tomić (CRO)
2019 Manchester	Panipak Wongpattanakit (THA)	Wu Jingyu (CHN)	Kristina Tomić (CRO)
2019 Manchester	Panipak Wongpattanakit (THA)	Wu Jingyu (CHN)	Rukiye Yıldırım (TUR)
2022 Guadalajara	Daniela Souza (MEX)	Guo Qing (CHN)	Dunya Abutaleb (KSA)
2022 Guadalajara	Daniela Souza (MEX)	Guo Qing (CHN)	Panipak Wongpattanakit (THA)
2023 Baku	Merve Dinçel (TUR)	Panipak Wongpattanakit (THA)	Bruna Duvančić (CRO)
2023 Baku	Merve Dinçel (TUR)	Panipak Wongpattanakit (THA)	Adriana Cerezo (ESP)
2025 Wuxi	Liu You-yun (TPE)	Elif Sude Akgül (TUR)	Fu Xiaolu (CHN)
2025 Wuxi	Liu You-yun (TPE)	Elif Sude Akgül (TUR)	Nodira Akhmedova (KAZ)

== Bantamweight ==
- −51 kg: 1987–1997
- −55 kg: 1999–2007
- −53 kg: 2009–

Championships	Gold	Silver	Bronze
1987 Barcelona	Tennur Yerlisu (TUR)	Josefina López (ESP)	Margarita Ogarrio (MEX)
1987 Barcelona	Tennur Yerlisu (TUR)	Josefina López (ESP)	Tung Ya-ling (TPE)
1989 Seoul	Jung Nam-suk (KOR)	Diane Murray (USA)	Chen Yi-an (TPE)
1989 Seoul	Jung Nam-suk (KOR)	Diane Murray (USA)	Ayşın Haktanır (TUR)
1991 Athens	Park Dong-seon (KOR)	Döndü Şahin (TUR)	Kathy Walker (GBR)
1991 Athens	Park Dong-seon (KOR)	Döndü Şahin (TUR)	Rosario Solís (ESP)
1993 New York City	Tang Hui-wen (TPE)	Elisabet Delgado (ESP)	Won Sun-jin (KOR)
1993 New York City	Tang Hui-wen (TPE)	Elisabet Delgado (ESP)	Diane Murray (USA)
1995 Manila	Won Sun-jin (KOR)	Michelle Thompson (USA)	Minako Hatakeyama (JPN)
1995 Manila	Won Sun-jin (KOR)	Michelle Thompson (USA)	Wu Shan-chen (TPE)
1997 Hong Kong	Hwang Eun-suk (KOR)	Roxane Forget (CAN)	Lauren Burns (AUS)
1997 Hong Kong	Hwang Eun-suk (KOR)	Roxane Forget (CAN)	Elisabet Delgado (ESP)
1999 Edmonton	Wang Su (CHN)	Jung Jae-eun (KOR)	Christiana Bach (SUI)
1999 Edmonton	Wang Su (CHN)	Jung Jae-eun (KOR)	Meng Mei-chun (TPE)
2001 Jeju	Jung Jae-eun (KOR)	Gemma Magría (ESP)	Pamela Agostinelli (ITA)
2001 Jeju	Jung Jae-eun (KOR)	Gemma Magría (ESP)	Paola Félix (MEX)
2003 Garmisch-P.	Ha Jeong-yeon (KOR)	Taylor Stone (USA)	Véronique St-Jacques (CAN)
2003 Garmisch-P.	Ha Jeong-yeon (KOR)	Taylor Stone (USA)	Nootcharin Sukkhongdumnoen (THA)
2005 Madrid	Kim Bo-hye (KOR)	Zeynep Murat (TUR)	Orphée Ladouceur (CAN)
2005 Madrid	Kim Bo-hye (KOR)	Zeynep Murat (TUR)	Eman Helmy (EGY)
2007 Beijing	Jung Jin-hee (KOR)	Tseng Yi-hsuan (TPE)	Yaimara Rosario (CUB)
2007 Beijing	Jung Jin-hee (KOR)	Tseng Yi-hsuan (TPE)	Andrea Rica (ESP)
2009 Copenhagen	Danielle Pelham (USA)	Sarita Phongsri (THA)	Euda Carías (GUA)
2009 Copenhagen	Danielle Pelham (USA)	Sarita Phongsri (THA)	Kwon Eun-kyung (KOR)
2011 Gyeongju	Ana Zaninović (CRO)	Lamyaa Bekkali (MAR)	Lee Hye-young (KOR)
2011 Gyeongju	Ana Zaninović (CRO)	Lamyaa Bekkali (MAR)	Hatice Kübra Yangın (TUR)
2013 Puebla	Kim Yu-jin (KOR)	Ana Zaninović (CRO)	Yamisel Núñez (CUB)
2013 Puebla	Kim Yu-jin (KOR)	Ana Zaninović (CRO)	Floriane Liborio (FRA)
2015 Chelyabinsk	Lim Geum-byeol (KOR)	Huang Yun-wen (TPE)	Ana Zaninović (CRO)
2015 Chelyabinsk	Lim Geum-byeol (KOR)	Huang Yun-wen (TPE)	Andriana Asprogeraka (GRE)
2017 Muju	Zeliha Ağrıs (TUR)	Tatiana Kudashova (RUS)	Inese Tarvida (LAT)
2017 Muju	Zeliha Ağrıs (TUR)	Tatiana Kudashova (RUS)	Dinorahon Mamadibragimova (UZB)
2019 Manchester	Phannapa Harnsujin (THA)	Tatiana Kudashova (RUS)	Aaliyah Powell (GBR)
2019 Manchester	Phannapa Harnsujin (THA)	Tatiana Kudashova (RUS)	Inese Tarvida (LAT)
2022 Guadalajara	Makayla Greenwood (USA)	Zuo Ju (CHN)	Ivana Duvančić (CRO)
2022 Guadalajara	Makayla Greenwood (USA)	Zuo Ju (CHN)	Tijana Bogdanović (SRB)
2023 Baku	Nahid Kiani (IRI)	Zuo Ju (CHN)	Tatiana Minina (AIN)
2023 Baku	Nahid Kiani (IRI)	Zuo Ju (CHN)	Shahd El-Hosseiny (EGY)
2025 Wuxi	Merve Dinçel (TUR)	Dunya Abutaleb (KSA)	Zhang Chuling (CHN)
2025 Wuxi	Merve Dinçel (TUR)	Dunya Abutaleb (KSA)	Jana Khattab (EGY)

== Featherweight ==
- −55 kg: 1987–1997
- −59 kg: 1999–2007
- −57 kg: 2009–

Championships	Gold	Silver	Bronze
1987 Barcelona	Kim So-young (KOR)	Kim Dotson (USA)	Anne-Mette Christensen (DEN)
1987 Barcelona	Kim So-young (KOR)	Kim Dotson (USA)	Züleyha Tan (TUR)
1989 Seoul	Kim So-young (KOR)	Kim Dotson (USA)	Raquel Palacios (ESP)
1989 Seoul	Kim So-young (KOR)	Kim Dotson (USA)	Patricia Mariscal (MEX)
1991 Athens	Tung Ya-ling (TPE)	Ayşegül Ergin (TUR)	Azza Adel (EGY)
1991 Athens	Tung Ya-ling (TPE)	Ayşegül Ergin (TUR)	Josefina López (ESP)
1993 New York City	Lee Seung-min (KOR)	Nuray Deliktaş (TUR)	Cathrin Vetter (GER)
1993 New York City	Lee Seung-min (KOR)	Nuray Deliktaş (TUR)	Sarah Maitimu (NED)
1995 Manila	Lee Seung-min (KOR)	Leonildes Santos (BRA)	Nuray Deliktaş (TUR)
1995 Manila	Lee Seung-min (KOR)	Leonildes Santos (BRA)	Janet Glasman (USA)
1997 Hong Kong	Jung Jae-eun (KOR)	Carine Zelmonovitch (FRA)	Raveevadee Pansombut (THA)
1997 Hong Kong	Jung Jae-eun (KOR)	Carine Zelmonovitch (FRA)	Lai Hsiu-wen (TPE)
1999 Edmonton	Kang Hae-eun (KOR)	Iridia Salazar (MEX)	Gaël Texier (CAN)
1999 Edmonton	Kang Hae-eun (KOR)	Iridia Salazar (MEX)	Sonia Reyes (ESP)
2001 Jeju	Jang Ji-won (KOR)	Iridia Salazar (MEX)	Sonia Reyes (ESP)
2001 Jeju	Jang Ji-won (KOR)	Iridia Salazar (MEX)	Zeynep Murat (TUR)
2003 Garmisch-P.	Areti Athanasopoulou (GRE)	Iridia Salazar (MEX)	Lise Hjortshøj (DEN)
2003 Garmisch-P.	Areti Athanasopoulou (GRE)	Iridia Salazar (MEX)	Sonia Reyes (ESP)
2005 Madrid	Diana López (USA)	Kim Sae-rom (KOR)	Karine Sergerie (CAN)
2005 Madrid	Diana López (USA)	Kim Sae-rom (KOR)	Bineta Diédhiou (SEN)
2007 Beijing	Lee Sung-hye (KOR)	Hamide Bıkçın (TUR)	Watcharaporn Dongnoi (THA)
2007 Beijing	Lee Sung-hye (KOR)	Hamide Bıkçın (TUR)	Diana López (USA)
2009 Copenhagen	Hou Yuzhuo (CHN)	Veronica Calabrese (ITA)	Andrea Rica (ESP)
2009 Copenhagen	Hou Yuzhuo (CHN)	Veronica Calabrese (ITA)	Tseng Pei-hua (TPE)
2011 Gyeongju	Hou Yuzhuo (CHN)	Jade Jones (GBR)	Marlène Harnois (FRA)
2011 Gyeongju	Hou Yuzhuo (CHN)	Jade Jones (GBR)	Lim Su-jeong (KOR)
2013 Puebla	Kim So-hee (KOR)	Mayu Hamada (JPN)	Eva Calvo (ESP)
2013 Puebla	Kim So-hee (KOR)	Mayu Hamada (JPN)	Anna-Lena Frömming (GER)
2015 Chelyabinsk	Mayu Hamada (JPN)	Eva Calvo (ESP)	Edina Kotsis (HUN)
2015 Chelyabinsk	Mayu Hamada (JPN)	Eva Calvo (ESP)	Kimia Alizadeh (IRI)
2017 Muju	Lee Ah-reum (KOR)	Hatice Kübra İlgün (TUR)	Jade Jones (GBR)
2017 Muju	Lee Ah-reum (KOR)	Hatice Kübra İlgün (TUR)	Nikita Glasnović (SWE)
2019 Manchester	Jade Jones (GBR)	Lee Ah-reum (KOR)	Skylar Park (CAN)
2019 Manchester	Jade Jones (GBR)	Lee Ah-reum (KOR)	Zhou Lijun (CHN)
2022 Guadalajara	Luo Zongshi (CHN)	Lo Chia-ling (TPE)	Jade Jones (GBR)
2022 Guadalajara	Luo Zongshi (CHN)	Lo Chia-ling (TPE)	Hatice Kübra İlgün (TUR)
2023 Baku	Luana Márton (HUN)	Lo Chia-ling (TPE)	Maria Clara Pacheco (BRA)
2023 Baku	Luana Márton (HUN)	Lo Chia-ling (TPE)	Hatice Kübra İlgün (TUR)
2025 Wuxi	Maria Clara Pacheco (BRA)	Kim Yu-jin (KOR)	Luo Zongshi (CHN)
2025 Wuxi	Maria Clara Pacheco (BRA)	Kim Yu-jin (KOR)	Fadia Khirfan (JOR)

== Lightweight ==
- −60 kg: 1987–1997
- −63 kg: 1999–2007
- −62 kg: 2009–

Championships	Gold	Silver	Bronze
1987 Barcelona	Lee Eun-young (KOR)	Hsien Feng-lien (TPE)	Elena Navaz (ESP)
1987 Barcelona	Lee Eun-young (KOR)	Hsien Feng-lien (TPE)	Brigitte Evanno (FRA)
1989 Seoul	Lee Eun-young (KOR)	Liu Chao-ching (TPE)	Elena Benítez (ESP)
1989 Seoul	Lee Eun-young (KOR)	Liu Chao-ching (TPE)	Şeyda Şerefoğlu (TUR)
1991 Athens	Jeong Eun-ok (KOR)	Chen Yi-an (TPE)	Dolores Knoll (MEX)
1991 Athens	Jeong Eun-ok (KOR)	Chen Yi-an (TPE)	Minouschka Thielman (NED)
1993 New York City	María Jesús Santolaria (ESP)	Park Kyung-suk (KOR)	Marina Agüero (ARG)
1993 New York City	María Jesús Santolaria (ESP)	Park Kyung-suk (KOR)	Ineabelle Díaz (PUR)
1995 Manila	Park Kyung-suk (KOR)	Vanina Sánchez (ARG)	Miet Filipović (CRO)
1995 Manila	Park Kyung-suk (KOR)	Vanina Sánchez (ARG)	Marlene Ramírez (MEX)
1997 Hong Kong	Kang Hae-eun (KOR)	Hung Chia-chun (TPE)	Miet Filipović (CRO)
1997 Hong Kong	Kang Hae-eun (KOR)	Hung Chia-chun (TPE)	Luisa Arnanz (ESP)
1999 Edmonton	Cho Hyang-mi (KOR)	Zhang Huijing (CHN)	Lisa O'Keefe (AUS)
1999 Edmonton	Cho Hyang-mi (KOR)	Zhang Huijing (CHN)	Ekaterina Noskova (RUS)
2001 Jeju	Kim Yeon-ji (KOR)	Belén Fernández (ESP)	Natália Falavigna (BRA)
2001 Jeju	Kim Yeon-ji (KOR)	Belén Fernández (ESP)	Mouna Benabderrassoul (MAR)
2003 Garmisch-P.	Kim Yeon-ji (KOR)	Karine Sergerie (CAN)	Tina Morgan (AUS)
2003 Garmisch-P.	Kim Yeon-ji (KOR)	Karine Sergerie (CAN)	Yuliya Sukhavitskaya (BLR)
2005 Madrid	Edna Díaz (MEX)	Su Li-wen (TPE)	Carmen Marton (AUS)
2005 Madrid	Edna Díaz (MEX)	Su Li-wen (TPE)	Chonnapas Premwaew (THA)
2007 Beijing	Karine Sergerie (CAN)	Park Hye-mi (KOR)	Mona Solheim (NOR)
2007 Beijing	Karine Sergerie (CAN)	Park Hye-mi (KOR)	Nia Abdallah (USA)
2009 Copenhagen	Lim Su-jeong (KOR)	Zhang Hua (CHN)	Estefanía Hernández (ESP)
2009 Copenhagen	Lim Su-jeong (KOR)	Zhang Hua (CHN)	Chonnapas Premwaew (THA)
2011 Gyeongju	Rangsiya Nisaisom (THA)	Marina Sumić (CRO)	Karine Sergerie (CAN)
2011 Gyeongju	Rangsiya Nisaisom (THA)	Marina Sumić (CRO)	Dürdane Altunel (TUR)
2013 Puebla	Carmen Marton (AUS)	Kim Hwi-lang (KOR)	Rabia Gülec (GER)
2013 Puebla	Carmen Marton (AUS)	Kim Hwi-lang (KOR)	Nina Kläy (SUI)
2015 Chelyabinsk	İrem Yaman (TUR)	Marta Calvo (ESP)	Viktoryia Belanouskaya (BLR)
2015 Chelyabinsk	İrem Yaman (TUR)	Marta Calvo (ESP)	Rachelle Booth (GBR)
2017 Muju	Ruth Gbagbi (CIV)	Kimia Alizadeh (IRI)	Kim So-hee (KOR)
2017 Muju	Ruth Gbagbi (CIV)	Kimia Alizadeh (IRI)	Tatiana Kuzmina (RUS)
2019 Manchester	İrem Yaman (TUR)	Caroline Santos (BRA)	Bruna Vuletić (CRO)
2019 Manchester	İrem Yaman (TUR)	Caroline Santos (BRA)	Magda Wiet-Hénin (FRA)
2022 Guadalajara	Sarah Chaâri (BEL)	Theopoula Sarvanaki (GRE)	Aaliyah Powell (GBR)
2022 Guadalajara	Sarah Chaâri (BEL)	Theopoula Sarvanaki (GRE)	Feruza Sadikova (UZB)
2023 Baku	Liliia Khuzina (AIN)	Caroline Santos (BRA)	Aaliyah Powell (GBR)
2023 Baku	Liliia Khuzina (AIN)	Caroline Santos (BRA)	Feruza Sadikova (UZB)
2025 Wuxi	Wafa Masghouni (TUN)	Viviana Márton (HUN)	Gabriella Blewitt (AUS)
2025 Wuxi	Wafa Masghouni (TUN)	Viviana Márton (HUN)	Chen Ximin (CHN)

== Welterweight ==
- −65 kg: 1987–1997
- −67 kg: 1999–

Championships	Gold	Silver	Bronze
1987 Barcelona	Coral Bistuer (ESP)	Kim Ji-sook (KOR)	Tessa Gordon (CAN)
1987 Barcelona	Coral Bistuer (ESP)	Kim Ji-sook (KOR)	Tang Hui-ting (TPE)
1989 Seoul	Anita Silsby (USA)	Anne-Mieke Buijs (NED)	Kim Ji-sook (KOR)
1989 Seoul	Anita Silsby (USA)	Anne-Mieke Buijs (NED)	Ayşe Alkaya (TUR)
1991 Athens	Arlene Limas (USA)	Coral Bistuer (ESP)	Morfou Drosidou (GRE)
1991 Athens	Arlene Limas (USA)	Coral Bistuer (ESP)	Cho Hyang-mi (KOR)
1993 New York City	Kim Mi-young (KOR)	Morfou Drosidou (GRE)	Carolina Benjarano (COL)
1993 New York City	Kim Mi-young (KOR)	Morfou Drosidou (GRE)	Tsai Pei-shan (TPE)
1995 Manila	Cho Hyang-mi (KOR)	Hsu Chih-ling (TPE)	İnci Taşyürek (TUR)
1995 Manila	Cho Hyang-mi (KOR)	Hsu Chih-ling (TPE)	Dana Martin (USA)
1997 Hong Kong	Cho Hyang-mi (KOR)	Morfou Drosidou (GRE)	Marlene Ramírez (MEX)
1997 Hong Kong	Cho Hyang-mi (KOR)	Morfou Drosidou (GRE)	Hsu Chih-ling (TPE)
1999 Edmonton	Elena Benítez (ESP)	Mirjam Müskens (NED)	Barbara Pak (CAN)
1999 Edmonton	Elena Benítez (ESP)	Mirjam Müskens (NED)	Chang Wan-chen (TPE)
2001 Jeju	Kim Hye-mi (KOR)	Chang Wan-chen (TPE)	Luisa Arnanz (ESP)
2001 Jeju	Kim Hye-mi (KOR)	Chang Wan-chen (TPE)	Nina Solheim (NOR)
2003 Garmisch-P.	Lee Sun-hee (KOR)	Sandra Šarić (CRO)	Elisavet Mystakidou (GRE)
2003 Garmisch-P.	Lee Sun-hee (KOR)	Sandra Šarić (CRO)	Liya Nurkina (KAZ)
2005 Madrid	Hwang Kyung-seon (KOR)	Gwladys Épangue (FRA)	Sandra Šarić (CRO)
2005 Madrid	Hwang Kyung-seon (KOR)	Gwladys Épangue (FRA)	Ibone Lallana (ESP)
2007 Beijing	Hwang Kyung-seon (KOR)	Gwladys Épangue (FRA)	Sandra Šarić (CRO)
2007 Beijing	Hwang Kyung-seon (KOR)	Gwladys Épangue (FRA)	Helena Fromm (GER)
2009 Copenhagen	Gwladys Épangue (FRA)	Taimí Castellanos (CUB)	Sandra Šarić (CRO)
2009 Copenhagen	Gwladys Épangue (FRA)	Taimí Castellanos (CUB)	Nikolina Kursar (NOR)
2011 Gyeongju	Sarah Stevenson (GBR)	Guo Yunfei (CHN)	Helena Fromm (GER)
2011 Gyeongju	Sarah Stevenson (GBR)	Guo Yunfei (CHN)	Hwang Kyung-seon (KOR)
2013 Puebla	Haby Niaré (FRA)	Chuang Chia-chia (TPE)	Farida Azizova (AZE)
2013 Puebla	Haby Niaré (FRA)	Chuang Chia-chia (TPE)	Franka Anić (SLO)
2015 Chelyabinsk	Chuang Chia-chia (TPE)	Nur Tatar (TUR)	Katherine Dumar (COL)
2015 Chelyabinsk	Chuang Chia-chia (TPE)	Nur Tatar (TUR)	Paige McPherson (USA)
2017 Muju	Nur Tatar (TUR)	Paige McPherson (USA)	Zhang Mengyu (CHN)
2017 Muju	Nur Tatar (TUR)	Paige McPherson (USA)	Kim Jan-di (KOR)
2019 Manchester	Zhang Mengyu (CHN)	Nur Tatar (TUR)	Farida Azizova (AZE)
2019 Manchester	Zhang Mengyu (CHN)	Nur Tatar (TUR)	Milena Titoneli (BRA)
2022 Guadalajara	Leslie Soltero (MEX)	Aleksandra Perišić (SRB)	Milena Titoneli (BRA)
2022 Guadalajara	Leslie Soltero (MEX)	Aleksandra Perišić (SRB)	Cecilia Castro (ESP)
2023 Baku	Magda Wiet-Hénin (FRA)	Julyana Al-Sadeq (JOR)	Ruth Gbagbi (CIV)
2023 Baku	Magda Wiet-Hénin (FRA)	Julyana Al-Sadeq (JOR)	Mari Romundset Nilsen (NOR)
2025 Wuxi	Luana Márton (HUN)	Milena Titoneli (BRA)	Lena Moreno (ESP)
2025 Wuxi	Luana Márton (HUN)	Milena Titoneli (BRA)	Elizabeth Anyanacho (NGR)

== Middleweight ==
- −70 kg: 1987–1997
- −72 kg: 1999–2007
- −73 kg: 2009–

Championships	Gold	Silver	Bronze
1987 Barcelona	Mandy de Jongh (NED)	Wang Chin-yu (TPE)	Angelika Biegger (FRG)
1987 Barcelona	Mandy de Jongh (NED)	Wang Chin-yu (TPE)	Sharon Jewell (USA)
1989 Seoul	Lydia Zele (USA)	Marcia King (CAN)	Antonia Vega (ESP)
1989 Seoul	Lydia Zele (USA)	Marcia King (CAN)	Hsu Ju-ya (TPE)
1991 Athens	Yang In-deok (KOR)	Chavela Aaron (USA)	Theano Ketesidou (GRE)
1991 Athens	Yang In-deok (KOR)	Chavela Aaron (USA)	Mónica del Real (MEX)
1993 New York City	Park Eun-sun (KOR)	Ekaterina Bassi (GRE)	Veera Liukkonen (FIN)
1993 New York City	Park Eun-sun (KOR)	Ekaterina Bassi (GRE)	Hsu Ju-ya (TPE)
1995 Manila	Ireane Ruíz (ESP)	Park Sun-mi (KOR)	Heidy Juárez (GUA)
1995 Manila	Ireane Ruíz (ESP)	Park Sun-mi (KOR)	Mónica del Real (MEX)
1997 Hong Kong	Woo Eun-joung (KOR)	Mounia Bourguigue (MAR)	Ireane Ruíz (ESP)
1997 Hong Kong	Woo Eun-joung (KOR)	Mounia Bourguigue (MAR)	Mónica del Real (MEX)
1999 Edmonton	Kim Yoon-kyung (KOR)	Ibone Lallana (ESP)	Chen Zhong (CHN)
1999 Edmonton	Kim Yoon-kyung (KOR)	Ibone Lallana (ESP)	Filiz Nur Aydın (TUR)
2001 Jeju	Sarah Stevenson (GBR)	Chen Zhong (CHN)	Alesiya Charnyovskaya (BLR)
2001 Jeju	Sarah Stevenson (GBR)	Chen Zhong (CHN)	Elisavet Mystakidou (GRE)
2003 Garmisch-P.	Luo Wei (CHN)	Myriam Baverel (FRA)	Aitziber Los Arcos (ESP)
2003 Garmisch-P.	Luo Wei (CHN)	Myriam Baverel (FRA)	Mounia Bourguigue (MAR)
2005 Madrid	Natália Falavigna (BRA)	Sarah Stevenson (GBR)	Aitziber Los Arcos (ESP)
2005 Madrid	Natália Falavigna (BRA)	Sarah Stevenson (GBR)	Jung Sun-young (KOR)
2007 Beijing	María Espinoza (MEX)	Lee In-jong (KOR)	Natália Falavigna (BRA)
2007 Beijing	María Espinoza (MEX)	Lee In-jong (KOR)	Luo Wei (CHN)
2009 Copenhagen	Han Yingying (CHN)	Lee In-jong (KOR)	Anastasia Baryshnikova (RUS)
2009 Copenhagen	Han Yingying (CHN)	Lee In-jong (KOR)	Furkan Asena Aydın (TUR)
2011 Gyeongju	Gwladys Épangue (FRA)	Oh Hye-ri (KOR)	Anastasia Baryshnikova (RUS)
2011 Gyeongju	Gwladys Épangue (FRA)	Oh Hye-ri (KOR)	Milica Mandić (SRB)
2013 Puebla	Glenhis Hernández (CUB)	Lee In-jong (KOR)	Jasmine Vokey (CAN)
2013 Puebla	Glenhis Hernández (CUB)	Lee In-jong (KOR)	Casandra Ikonen (SWE)
2015 Chelyabinsk	Oh Hye-ri (KOR)	Zheng Shuyin (CHN)	Iva Radoš (CRO)
2015 Chelyabinsk	Oh Hye-ri (KOR)	Zheng Shuyin (CHN)	Jackie Galloway (USA)
2017 Muju	Milica Mandić (SRB)	Oh Hye-ri (KOR)	María Espinoza (MEX)
2017 Muju	Milica Mandić (SRB)	Oh Hye-ri (KOR)	Reshmie Oogink (NED)
2019 Manchester	Lee Da-bin (KOR)	María Espinoza (MEX)	Marie-Paule Blé (FRA)
2019 Manchester	Lee Da-bin (KOR)	María Espinoza (MEX)	Nafia Kuş (TUR)
2022 Guadalajara	Nadica Božanić (SRB)	Lee Da-bin (KOR)	Rebecca McGowan (GBR)
2022 Guadalajara	Nadica Božanić (SRB)	Lee Da-bin (KOR)	Crystal Weekes (PUR)
2023 Baku	Althéa Laurin (FRA)	Rebecca McGowan (GBR)	Polina Khan (AIN)
2023 Baku	Althéa Laurin (FRA)	Rebecca McGowan (GBR)	Matea Jelić (CRO)
2025 Wuxi	Sarah Chaâri (BEL)	Kimi Laurène Ossin (CIV)	Zhou Zeqi (CHN)
2025 Wuxi	Sarah Chaâri (BEL)	Kimi Laurène Ossin (CIV)	Sude Yaren Uzunçavdar (TUR)

== Heavyweight ==
- +70 kg: 1987–1997
- +72 kg: 1999–2007
- +73 kg: 2009–

Championships	Gold	Silver	Bronze
1987 Barcelona	Lynnette Love (USA)	Liu Yi-ling (TPE)	Jang Yoon-jung (KOR)
1987 Barcelona	Lynnette Love (USA)	Liu Yi-ling (TPE)	Anne-Mieke Buijs (NED)
1989 Seoul	Jung Wan-sook (KOR)	Yvonne Franssen (CAN)	Yolanda Santana (ESP)
1989 Seoul	Jung Wan-sook (KOR)	Yvonne Franssen (CAN)	Chun Yang-hsi (TPE)
1991 Athens	Lynnette Love (USA)	Yvonne Franssen (CAN)	Bettina Hipf (GER)
1991 Athens	Lynnette Love (USA)	Yvonne Franssen (CAN)	Anna Widehov (SWE)
1993 New York City	Jung Myoung-sook (KOR)	Adriana Carmona (VEN)	Elisavet Mystakidou (GRE)
1993 New York City	Jung Myoung-sook (KOR)	Adriana Carmona (VEN)	Anna Widehov (SWE)
1995 Manila	Jung Myoung-sook (KOR)	Yolanda García (ESP)	Nataša Vezmar (CRO)
1995 Manila	Jung Myoung-sook (KOR)	Yolanda García (ESP)	Huang Hsiao-ying (TPE)
1997 Hong Kong	Jung Myoung-sook (KOR)	Natalia Ivanova (RUS)	Nataša Vezmar (CRO)
1997 Hong Kong	Jung Myoung-sook (KOR)	Natalia Ivanova (RUS)	Chiu Meng-jen (TPE)
1999 Edmonton	Kao Ching-yi (TPE)	Dominique Bosshart (CAN)	Laurence Rase (BEL)
1999 Edmonton	Kao Ching-yi (TPE)	Dominique Bosshart (CAN)	Maria Konyakhina (RUS)
2001 Jeju	Sin Kyung-hyen (KOR)	Wang I-hsien (TPE)	Mariya Zhuravskaya (BLR)
2001 Jeju	Sin Kyung-hyen (KOR)	Wang I-hsien (TPE)	Maria Konyakhina (RUS)
2003 Garmisch-P.	Youn Hyun-jung (KOR)	Nataša Vezmar (CRO)	Chen Zhong (CHN)
2003 Garmisch-P.	Youn Hyun-jung (KOR)	Nataša Vezmar (CRO)	Kyriaki Kouvari (GRE)
2005 Madrid	Sin Kyung-hyen (KOR)	Ineabelle Díaz (PUR)	Laurence Rase (BEL)
2005 Madrid	Sin Kyung-hyen (KOR)	Ineabelle Díaz (PUR)	Liu Rui (CHN)
2007 Beijing	Chen Zhong (CHN)	Han Jin-sun (KOR)	Daniela Castrignano (ITA)
2007 Beijing	Chen Zhong (CHN)	Han Jin-sun (KOR)	Tsui Fang-hsuan (TPE)
2009 Copenhagen	Rosana Simón (ESP)	Liu Rui (CHN)	Natália Falavigna (BRA)
2009 Copenhagen	Rosana Simón (ESP)	Liu Rui (CHN)	Jo Seol (KOR)
2011 Gyeongju	Anne-Caroline Graffe (FRA)	An Sae-bom (KOR)	Rosana Simón (ESP)
2011 Gyeongju	Anne-Caroline Graffe (FRA)	An Sae-bom (KOR)	Olga Ivanova (RUS)
2013 Puebla	Olga Ivanova (RUS)	Briseida Acosta (MEX)	Anne-Caroline Graffe (FRA)
2013 Puebla	Olga Ivanova (RUS)	Briseida Acosta (MEX)	Ana Bajić (SRB)
2015 Chelyabinsk	Bianca Walkden (GBR)	Gwladys Épangue (FRA)	Olga Ivanova (RUS)
2015 Chelyabinsk	Bianca Walkden (GBR)	Gwladys Épangue (FRA)	Nafia Kuş (TUR)
2017 Muju	Bianca Walkden (GBR)	Jackie Galloway (USA)	Zheng Shuyin (CHN)
2017 Muju	Bianca Walkden (GBR)	Jackie Galloway (USA)	An Sae-bom (KOR)
2019 Manchester	Bianca Walkden (GBR)	Zheng Shuyin (CHN)	Doris Pole (CRO)
2019 Manchester	Bianca Walkden (GBR)	Zheng Shuyin (CHN)	Briseida Acosta (MEX)
2022 Guadalajara	Svetlana Osipova (UZB)	Dana Azran (ISR)	Marlene Jahl (AUT)
2022 Guadalajara	Svetlana Osipova (UZB)	Dana Azran (ISR)	Lorena Brandl (GER)
2023 Baku	Nafia Kuş (TUR)	Svetlana Osipova (UZB)	Kristina Adebaio (AIN)
2023 Baku	Nafia Kuş (TUR)	Svetlana Osipova (UZB)	Bianca Cook (GBR)
2025 Wuxi	Nafia Kuş (TUR)	Svetlana Osipova (UZB)	Mu Wenzhe (CHN)
2025 Wuxi	Nafia Kuş (TUR)	Svetlana Osipova (UZB)	Lauren Williams (GBR)

== Medal table ==
Rank	Nation	Gold	Silver	Bronze	Total
1	South Korea	61	24	15	100
2	Turkey	13	11	21	45
3	Spain	12	11	30	53
4	China	11	15	21	47
5	Chinese Taipei	10	17	23	50
6	United States	8	8	16	32
7	France	6	5	8	19
8	Great Britain	6	3	10	19
9	Thailand	5	5	10	20
10	Mexico	4	8	11	23
11	Croatia	3	5	17	25
12	Serbia	3	1	4	8
13	Brazil	2	4	7	13
14	Hungary	2	1	1	4
15	Belgium	2	0	2	4
16	Canada	1	6	10	17
17	Russia	1	5	9	15
18	Greece	1	4	8	13
19	Netherlands	1	3	4	8
20	Cuba	1	2	4	7
21	Uzbekistan	1	2	3	6
22	Iran	1	2	1	4
–	Individual Neutral Athletes^{a}	1	1	3	5
23	Japan	1	1	2	4
24	Ivory Coast	1	1	1	3
25	Australia	1	0	8	9
26	Tunisia	1	0	1	2
27	Morocco	0	2	3	5
27	Puerto Rico	0	2	3	5
29	Jordan	0	2	1	3
30	Germany	0	1	10	11
31	Italy	0	1	3	4
32	Argentina	0	1	2	3
32	Venezuela	0	1	2	3
34	Saudi Arabia	0	1	1	2
34	Vietnam	0	1	1	2
36	Indonesia	0	1	0	1
36	Israel	0	1	0	1
36	Ukraine	0	1	0	1
39	Egypt	0	0	5	5
40	Belarus	0	0	4	4
40	Colombia	0	0	4	4
40	Kazakhstan	0	0	4	4
40	Norway	0	0	4	4
40	Sweden	0	0	4	4
45	Austria	0	0	2	2
45	Azerbaijan	0	0	2	2
45	Denmark	0	0	2	2
45	Guatemala	0	0	2	2
45	Latvia	0	0	2	2
45	Switzerland	0	0	2	2
51	Dominican Republic	0	0	1	1
51	Finland	0	0	1	1
51	Nepal	0	0	1	1
51	Nigeria	0	0	1	1
51	Senegal	0	0	1	1
51	Slovenia	0	0	1	1
51	West Germany	0	0	1	1
Totals (57 entries)		160	160	320	640

a At the 2023 and 2025 World Championships, athletes from Russia and Belarus in accordance with sanctions imposed following by the 2022 Russian invasion of Ukraine participated as Individual Neutral Athletes (AIN), their medals were not included in the official medal table.

== See also ==
- List of Olympic medalists in taekwondo
