= 1996 Asian Taekwondo Championships =

Taekwondo competition

- Location: Melbourne, Australia
- Dates: 14–16 June 1996

Champions
- Men: South Korea
- Women: South Korea

The 1996 Asian Taekwondo Championships are the 12th edition of the Asian Taekwondo Championships, and were held in Melbourne, Australia from 14 June to 16 June, 1996.

== Medal summary ==
=== Men ===
Event	Gold	Silver	Bronze
Finweight −50 kg	Kim Byung-tae; South Korea	Roberto Cruz; Philippines	John Carneli; Australia
Finweight −50 kg	Kim Byung-tae; South Korea	Roberto Cruz; Philippines	Feizollah Nafjam; Iran
Flyweight −54 kg	Yoo Yong-taek; South Korea	Mehrdad Rokni; Iran	Takeshi Sannomiya; Japan
Flyweight −54 kg	Yoo Yong-taek; South Korea	Mehrdad Rokni; Iran	Mohammed Saddiq; Saudi Arabia
Bantamweight −58 kg	Kim Hyun-yong; South Korea	Huang Chih-hsiung; Chinese Taipei	Muhammad Yusuf; Indonesia
Bantamweight −58 kg	Kim Hyun-yong; South Korea	Huang Chih-hsiung; Chinese Taipei	Hironobu Yamashita; Japan
Featherweight −64 kg	Bijan Moghanloo; Iran	Yoo Yong-jin; South Korea	Mohammad Al-Ruz; Jordan
Featherweight −64 kg	Bijan Moghanloo; Iran	Yoo Yong-jin; South Korea	Ricardo Santiago; Philippines
Lightweight −70 kg	Shim Ki-sun; South Korea	Fariborz Askari; Iran	Hiroshi Kanai; Japan
Lightweight −70 kg	Shim Ki-sun; South Korea	Fariborz Askari; Iran	Mohammad Shdaifat; Jordan
Welterweight −76 kg	Kim Kyong-hun; South Korea	Majid Aflaki; Iran	Mitsushige Arita; Japan
Welterweight −76 kg	Kim Kyong-hun; South Korea	Majid Aflaki; Iran	Saneh Jaritrum; Thailand
Middleweight −83 kg	Lee Dong-wan; South Korea	Majid Amintorabi; Iran	Paul Dowie; Australia
Middleweight −83 kg	Lee Dong-wan; South Korea	Majid Amintorabi; Iran	Men Fengwei; China
Heavyweight +83 kg	Farzad Zarakhsh; Iran	Daniel Trenton; Australia	Andri Halim; Indonesia
Heavyweight +83 kg	Farzad Zarakhsh; Iran	Daniel Trenton; Australia	Khaled Al-Dosari; Saudi Arabia

=== Women ===
Event	Gold	Silver	Bronze
Finweight −43 kg	Yang So-hee; South Korea	Chi Shu-ju; Chinese Taipei	Eva Marie Ditan; Philippines
Finweight −43 kg	Yang So-hee; South Korea	Chi Shu-ju; Chinese Taipei	Nguyễn Thị Xuân Mai; Vietnam
Flyweight −47 kg	Sangina Baidya; Nepal	Kim Bo-in; South Korea	Vicki Cenere; Australia
Flyweight −47 kg	Sangina Baidya; Nepal	Kim Bo-in; South Korea	Trần Thị Mỹ Linh; Vietnam
Bantamweight −51 kg	Tang Hui-wen; Chinese Taipei	Won Sun-jin; South Korea	Carmela Hartnett; Australia
Bantamweight −51 kg	Tang Hui-wen; Chinese Taipei	Won Sun-jin; South Korea	Huỳnh Thị Bích Ngọc; Vietnam
Featherweight −55 kg	Lee Seung-min; South Korea	Trần Hiếu Ngân; Vietnam	Meng Mei-chun; Chinese Taipei
Featherweight −55 kg	Lee Seung-min; South Korea	Trần Hiếu Ngân; Vietnam	Anna Marissa de Leon; Philippines
Lightweight −60 kg	Lee Sun-hee; South Korea	Lee Liu-wen; Chinese Taipei	Ong Bee Lan; Singapore
Lightweight −60 kg	Lee Sun-hee; South Korea	Lee Liu-wen; Chinese Taipei	Nutcharin Sook; Thailand
Welterweight −65 kg	Cho Hyang-mi; South Korea	Yoriko Okamoto; Japan	Hsu Chih-ling; Chinese Taipei
Welterweight −65 kg	Cho Hyang-mi; South Korea	Yoriko Okamoto; Japan	Janeth Tenorio; Philippines
Middleweight −70 kg	Park Eun-sun; South Korea	Lydia Zakkas; Australia	Verina Wihongi; New Zealand
Middleweight −70 kg	Park Eun-sun; South Korea	Lydia Zakkas; Australia	Marites Javier; Philippines
Heavyweight +70 kg	Lee Myung-suk; South Korea	Tanya White; Australia	Sinta Berliana Heru; Indonesia
Heavyweight +70 kg	Lee Myung-suk; South Korea	Tanya White; Australia	Lee Wan Yuen; Malaysia

== Medal table ==
Rank	Nation	Gold	Silver	Bronze	Total
1	South Korea	12	3	0	15
2	Iran	2	4	1	7
3	Chinese Taipei	1	3	2	6
4	Nepal	1	0	0	1
5	Australia	0	3	4	7
6	Philippines	0	1	5	6
7	Japan	0	1	4	5
8	Vietnam	0	1	3	4
9	Indonesia	0	0	3	3
10	Jordan	0	0	2	2
10	Saudi Arabia	0	0	2	2
10	Thailand	0	0	2	2
13	China	0	0	1	1
13	Malaysia	0	0	1	1
13	New Zealand	0	0	1	1
13	Singapore	0	0	1	1
Totals (16 entries)		16	16	32	64
