= 1998 Asian Taekwondo Championships =

Taekwondo competition

- Location: Ho Chi Minh City, Vietnam
- Dates: 15–17 May 1998

Champions
- Men: South Korea
- Women: South Korea

The 1998 Asian Taekwondo Championships are the 13th edition of the Asian Taekwondo Championships, and were held in Ho Chi Minh City, Vietnam from May 15 to May 17, 1998.

== Medal summary ==
=== Men ===
Event	Gold	Silver	Bronze
Finweight −50 kg	Lee Hou-kun; Chinese Taipei	Mohammad Al-Hamed; Jordan	Kim Byung-tae; South Korea
Finweight −50 kg	Lee Hou-kun; Chinese Taipei	Mohammad Al-Hamed; Jordan	Trần Quang Vinh; Vietnam
Flyweight −54 kg	Choi Man-yong; South Korea	Nguyễn Duy Khương; Vietnam	Nick Tsioulos; Australia
Flyweight −54 kg	Choi Man-yong; South Korea	Nguyễn Duy Khương; Vietnam	Liu Huasheng; China
Bantamweight −58 kg	Kim Eui-chul; South Korea	Meng Fan-an; Chinese Taipei	Liu Chuang; China
Bantamweight −58 kg	Kim Eui-chul; South Korea	Meng Fan-an; Chinese Taipei	S. Sinnathurai; Singapore
Featherweight −64 kg	Kang Nam-won; South Korea	Mohammad Taghi Khazraei; Iran	Chen Shih-kai; Chinese Taipei
Featherweight −64 kg	Kang Nam-won; South Korea	Mohammad Taghi Khazraei; Iran	Sarawanan Subramaniam; Malaysia
Lightweight −70 kg	Kim Byung-uk; South Korea	Chang Shih-lung; Chinese Taipei	Vahid Abdollahi; Iran
Lightweight −70 kg	Kim Byung-uk; South Korea	Chang Shih-lung; Chinese Taipei	Mohammad Al-Ruz; Jordan
Welterweight −76 kg	Ryu Keun-moo; South Korea	Ali Tajik; Iran	Chang Chu-tien; Chinese Taipei
Welterweight −76 kg	Ryu Keun-moo; South Korea	Ali Tajik; Iran	Mohammad Al-Fararjeh; Jordan
Middleweight −83 kg	Kang Dong-kuk; South Korea	Hussein Al-Tahleh; Jordan	Robert; Indonesia
Middleweight −83 kg	Kang Dong-kuk; South Korea	Hussein Al-Tahleh; Jordan	Alessandro Lubiano; Philippines
Heavyweight +83 kg	Kim Je-kyoung; South Korea	Khaled Al-Dosari; Saudi Arabia	Ibrahim Aqil; Jordan
Heavyweight +83 kg	Kim Je-kyoung; South Korea	Khaled Al-Dosari; Saudi Arabia	Saleh Derghami; Qatar

=== Women ===
Event	Gold	Silver	Bronze
Finweight −43 kg	Jang Jung-eun; South Korea	Khin Swee Oo; Myanmar	Huang Yu-hsin; Chinese Taipei
Finweight −43 kg	Jang Jung-eun; South Korea	Khin Swee Oo; Myanmar	Li Huang; China
Flyweight −47 kg	Chi Shu-ju; Chinese Taipei	Shim Hye-young; South Korea	Juana Wangsa Putri; Indonesia
Flyweight −47 kg	Chi Shu-ju; Chinese Taipei	Shim Hye-young; South Korea	Wong Liang Ming; Singapore
Bantamweight −51 kg	Lee Ji-eun; South Korea	Usa Sinlapajarn; Thailand	Umi Alifah; Indonesia
Bantamweight −51 kg	Lee Ji-eun; South Korea	Usa Sinlapajarn; Thailand	Al-Yasar Matar; Jordan
Featherweight −55 kg	Trần Hiếu Ngân; Vietnam	Nootcharin Sukkhongdumnoen; Thailand	Jung Jae-eun; South Korea
Featherweight −55 kg	Trần Hiếu Ngân; Vietnam	Nootcharin Sukkhongdumnoen; Thailand	Xu Shen; China
Lightweight −60 kg	Chen Yi-an; Chinese Taipei	Nelia Sy; Philippines	Lee Sun-hee; South Korea
Lightweight −60 kg	Chen Yi-an; Chinese Taipei	Nelia Sy; Philippines	Zhang Huijing; China
Welterweight −65 kg	Kim Mi-young; South Korea	Chen Zhong; China	Jasmin Strachan; Philippines
Welterweight −65 kg	Kim Mi-young; South Korea	Chen Zhong; China	Yoriko Okamoto; Japan
Middleweight −70 kg	He Lumin; China	Khúc Liễu Châu; Vietnam	Oh Jeong-hee; South Korea
Middleweight −70 kg	He Lumin; China	Khúc Liễu Châu; Vietnam	Hsieh Yen-chiu; Chinese Taipei
Heavyweight +70 kg	Jung Myoung-sook; South Korea	Kao Ching-yi; Chinese Taipei	Lee Wan Yuen; Malaysia
Heavyweight +70 kg	Jung Myoung-sook; South Korea	Kao Ching-yi; Chinese Taipei	Hồ Thị Thanh Ơn; Vietnam

== Medal table ==
Rank	Nation	Gold	Silver	Bronze	Total
1	South Korea	11	1	4	16
2	Chinese Taipei	3	3	4	10
3	Vietnam	1	2	2	5
4	China	1	1	5	7
5	Jordan	0	2	4	6
6	Iran	0	2	1	3
7	Thailand	0	2	0	2
8	Philippines	0	1	2	3
9	Myanmar	0	1	0	1
9	Saudi Arabia	0	1	0	1
11	Indonesia	0	0	3	3
12	Malaysia	0	0	2	2
12	Singapore	0	0	2	2
14	Australia	0	0	1	1
14	Japan	0	0	1	1
14	Qatar	0	0	1	1
Totals (16 entries)		16	16	32	64
