= 1990 Asian Taekwondo Championships =

Taekwondo Tournament in Asia, 1990

- Venue: Municipal Junior College
- Location: Taipei, Taiwan
- Dates: 2–4 June 1990

Champions
- Men: South Korea
- Women: Chinese Taipei

The 1990 Asian Taekwondo Championships were the 9th edition of the Asian Taekwondo Championships, and were held in Taipei from 2 to 4 June, 1990.

== Medal summary ==
=== Men ===
| Event | Gold | Silver | Bronze |
|---|---|---|---|
| Finweight (−50 kg) | Chang Jung-san; Chinese Taipei | Raul Samson; Philippines | Nabil Al-Halawani; Jordan |
| Finweight (−50 kg) | Chang Jung-san; Chinese Taipei | Raul Samson; Philippines | Narayan Gurung; Nepal |
| Flyweight (−54 kg) | Kwon Hauk-sun; South Korea | Wang Ming-sung; Chinese Taipei | Tan Kheng Juan; Singapore |
| Flyweight (−54 kg) | Kwon Hauk-sun; South Korea | Wang Ming-sung; Chinese Taipei | Cheng Kai Chung; Hong Kong |
| Bantamweight (−58 kg) | Kim Sung-jin; South Korea | Chen Yu-huan; Chinese Taipei | Mohammad Mater Azar; Kuwait |
| Bantamweight (−58 kg) | Kim Sung-jin; South Korea | Chen Yu-huan; Chinese Taipei | Hussein Makki; Jordan |
| Featherweight (−64 kg) | Lee Chian-hsiang; Chinese Taipei | Kim Hyun-chul; South Korea | Robert Vargas; Philippines |
| Featherweight (−64 kg) | Lee Chian-hsiang; Chinese Taipei | Kim Hyun-chul; South Korea | Tareq Lababidi; Jordan |
| Lightweight (−70 kg) | Park Se-jin; South Korea | Huang Ming-jen; Chinese Taipei | Yousef Abu Zaid; Jordan |
| Lightweight (−70 kg) | Park Se-jin; South Korea | Huang Ming-jen; Chinese Taipei | Noel Veneracion; Philippines |
| Welterweight (−76 kg) | Jin Jung-woo; South Korea | Hassan Zahedi; Iran | Liu Tsu-ien; Chinese Taipei |
| Welterweight (−76 kg) | Jin Jung-woo; South Korea | Hassan Zahedi; Iran | Tareq Nawaf; Jordan |
| Middleweight (−83 kg) | Jeong Yong-suk; South Korea | Salim Al-Zahrani; Saudi Arabia | Hossein Abbasi; Iran |
| Middleweight (−83 kg) | Jeong Yong-suk; South Korea | Salim Al-Zahrani; Saudi Arabia | Ammar Fahed Sbeihi; Jordan |
| Heavyweight (+83 kg) | Tawfiq Nwaiser; Jordan | Choi Sang-jin; South Korea | Farzad Zarakhsh; Iran |
| Heavyweight (+83 kg) | Tawfiq Nwaiser; Jordan | Choi Sang-jin; South Korea | Victor Bateman; Australia |

=== Women ===
| Event | Gold | Silver | Bronze |
|---|---|---|---|
| Finweight (−43 kg) | Wu Shan-chen; Chinese Taipei | Kim Jin-seong; South Korea | Vasugi Maruthamuthu; Malaysia |
| Finweight (−43 kg) | Wu Shan-chen; Chinese Taipei | Kim Jin-seong; South Korea | Sita Kumari Rai; Nepal |
| Flyweight (−47 kg) | Yenni Latief; Indonesia | Anita Falieros; Australia | Mo Sun-young; South Korea |
| Flyweight (−47 kg) | Yenni Latief; Indonesia | Anita Falieros; Australia | Lee Bee Hong; Malaysia |
| Bantamweight (−51 kg) | Lee Seung-min; South Korea | Hii King Hung; Malaysia | Susan Koh; Singapore |
| Bantamweight (−51 kg) | Lee Seung-min; South Korea | Hii King Hung; Malaysia | Chen Mei-hua; Chinese Taipei |
| Featherweight (−55 kg) | Tung Ya-ling; Chinese Taipei | Park Jin-kyung; South Korea | Lee Ka Ki; Hong Kong |
| Featherweight (−55 kg) | Tung Ya-ling; Chinese Taipei | Park Jin-kyung; South Korea | Mika Kishiyama; Japan |
| Lightweight (−60 kg) | Liu Chao-ching; Chinese Taipei | Nam Jung-dong; South Korea | Siauw Lung; Indonesia |
| Lightweight (−60 kg) | Liu Chao-ching; Chinese Taipei | Nam Jung-dong; South Korea | Angela Coulson; Australia |
| Welterweight (−65 kg) | Ko Jae-kyung; South Korea | Denise Parmley; Australia | Mary Alindogan; Philippines |
| Welterweight (−65 kg) | Ko Jae-kyung; South Korea | Denise Parmley; Australia | Hsien Feng-lien; Chinese Taipei |
| Middleweight (−70 kg) | Liu Yi-ling; Chinese Taipei | Anis Dewi; Indonesia | Lau Choo Boon; Malaysia |
| Middleweight (−70 kg) | Liu Yi-ling; Chinese Taipei | Anis Dewi; Indonesia | Beatriz Tioseco; Philippines |

== Medal table ==
| Rank | Nation | Gold | Silver | Bronze | Total |
|---|---|---|---|---|---|
| 1 | South Korea | 7 | 5 | 1 | 13 |
| 2 | Chinese Taipei | 6 | 3 | 3 | 12 |
| 3 | Indonesia | 1 | 1 | 1 | 3 |
| 4 | Jordan | 1 | 0 | 6 | 7 |
| 5 | Australia | 0 | 2 | 2 | 4 |
| 6 | Philippines | 0 | 1 | 4 | 5 |
| 7 | Malaysia | 0 | 1 | 3 | 4 |
| 8 | Iran | 0 | 1 | 2 | 3 |
| 9 | Saudi Arabia | 0 | 1 | 0 | 1 |
| 10 | Hong Kong | 0 | 0 | 2 | 2 |
| 10 | Nepal | 0 | 0 | 2 | 2 |
| 10 | Singapore | 0 | 0 | 2 | 2 |
| 13 | Japan | 0 | 0 | 1 | 1 |
| 13 | Kuwait | 0 | 0 | 1 | 1 |
| Totals (14 entries) | | 15 | 15 | 30 | 60 |

== Team ranking ==
=== Men ===
| Rank | Team | Points |
|---|---|---|
| 1 | South Korea | 76 |
| 2 | Chinese Taipei | 54 |
| 3 | Jordan | 37 |
| 4 | Iran | 23 |
| 5 | Philippines | 22 |
| 6 | Saudi Arabia | 17 |

=== Women ===
| Rank | Team | Points |
|---|---|---|
| 1 | Chinese Taipei | 56 |
| 2 | South Korea | 49 |
| 3 | Malaysia | 23 |
| 4 | Indonesia | 22 |
| 5 | Australia | 19 |
| 6 | Philippines | 16 |

== See also ==
- List of sporting events in Taiwan
