= Taekwondo at the 1998 Asian Games =

Taekwondo competition

- Venue: Thammasat Gymnasium 7
- Dates: 7–10 December 1998

Taekwondo took place from December 7 to December 10 at the 1998 Asian Games in Thammasat University, Gymnasium 7, Bangkok, Thailand. Each country (except the host nation) was limited to having 6 men and 6 women for the entire competition.

== Medalists ==
=== Men ===
Event	Gold	Silver	Bronze
Finweight (−50 kg)	Park Hee-kang; South Korea	Nguyễn Duy Khương; Vietnam	Wirat Pimthon; Thailand
Finweight (−50 kg)	Park Hee-kang; South Korea	Nguyễn Duy Khương; Vietnam	Kishor Shrestha; Nepal
Flyweight (−54 kg)	Hồ Nhất Thống; Vietnam	Satriyo Rahadhani; Indonesia	Anuarbek Amankulov; Kazakhstan
Flyweight (−54 kg)	Hồ Nhất Thống; Vietnam	Satriyo Rahadhani; Indonesia	Rodolfo Abratique; Philippines
Bantamweight (−58 kg)	Mehdi Bibak; Iran	Jatupol Yodanyamaneewong; Thailand	Liu Chuang; China
Bantamweight (−58 kg)	Mehdi Bibak; Iran	Jatupol Yodanyamaneewong; Thailand	Thamer Al-Mershad; Kuwait
Featherweight (−64 kg)	Kang Nam-won; South Korea	Donald Geisler; Philippines	Bijan Moghanloo; Iran
Featherweight (−64 kg)	Kang Nam-won; South Korea	Donald Geisler; Philippines	Hsu Chi-hung; Chinese Taipei
Lightweight (−70 kg)	Kim Byung-uk; South Korea	Sung Chen-hsien; Chinese Taipei	Kriangkrai Noikoed; Thailand
Lightweight (−70 kg)	Kim Byung-uk; South Korea	Sung Chen-hsien; Chinese Taipei	Hiroshi Kanai; Japan
Welterweight (−76 kg)	Ryu Keun-moo; South Korea	Majid Aflaki; Iran	Adilkhan Sagindykov; Kazakhstan
Welterweight (−76 kg)	Ryu Keun-moo; South Korea	Majid Aflaki; Iran	Mohammad Al-Fararjeh; Jordan
Middleweight (−83 kg)	Kang Dong-kuk; South Korea	Hussein Al-Tahleh; Jordan	Prawes Sattakom; Thailand
Middleweight (−83 kg)	Kang Dong-kuk; South Korea	Hussein Al-Tahleh; Jordan	Majid Amintorabi; Iran
Heavyweight (+83 kg)	Kim Je-kyoung; South Korea	Ibrahim Aqil; Jordan	Hassan Aslani; Iran
Heavyweight (+83 kg)	Kim Je-kyoung; South Korea	Ibrahim Aqil; Jordan	Nguyễn Văn Hùng; Vietnam

=== Women ===
Event	Gold	Silver	Bronze
Finweight (−43 kg)	Jang Jung-eun; South Korea	Nguyễn Thị Xuân Mai; Vietnam	Li Huang; China
Finweight (−43 kg)	Jang Jung-eun; South Korea	Nguyễn Thị Xuân Mai; Vietnam	Chi Shu-ju; Chinese Taipei
Flyweight (−47 kg)	Tang Hui-wen; Chinese Taipei	Usa Sinlapajarn; Thailand	Juana Wangsa Putri; Indonesia
Flyweight (−47 kg)	Tang Hui-wen; Chinese Taipei	Usa Sinlapajarn; Thailand	Yuan Guiru; China
Bantamweight (−51 kg)	Lee Ji-won; South Korea	Nootcharin Sukkhongdumnoen; Thailand	Sapana Malla; Nepal
Bantamweight (−51 kg)	Lee Ji-won; South Korea	Nootcharin Sukkhongdumnoen; Thailand	Trần Hiếu Ngân; Vietnam
Featherweight (−55 kg)	Chen Yi-an; Chinese Taipei	Sabita Rajbhandari; Nepal	Soo Lai Yin; Malaysia
Featherweight (−55 kg)	Chen Yi-an; Chinese Taipei	Sabita Rajbhandari; Nepal	Raveevadee Pansombut; Thailand
Lightweight (−60 kg)	Hsu Chih-ling; Chinese Taipei	Lee Sun-hee; South Korea	Yoriko Okamoto; Japan
Lightweight (−60 kg)	Hsu Chih-ling; Chinese Taipei	Lee Sun-hee; South Korea	Nelia Sy; Philippines
Welterweight (−65 kg)	Cho Hyang-mi; South Korea	Alaa Kutkut; Jordan	Chen Zhong; China
Welterweight (−65 kg)	Cho Hyang-mi; South Korea	Alaa Kutkut; Jordan	Kao Ching-yi; Chinese Taipei
Middleweight (−70 kg)	Lee Hee-young; South Korea	He Lumin; China	Sivaporn Meyer; Thailand
Middleweight (−70 kg)	Lee Hee-young; South Korea	He Lumin; China	Khúc Liễu Châu; Vietnam
Heavyweight (+70 kg)	Jung Myoung-sook; South Korea	Lee Wan Yuen; Malaysia	Sinta Berliana Heru; Indonesia
Heavyweight (+70 kg)	Jung Myoung-sook; South Korea	Lee Wan Yuen; Malaysia	Margarita Bonifacio; Philippines

== Medal table ==
Rank	Nation	Gold	Silver	Bronze	Total
1	South Korea (KOR)	11	1	0	12
2	Chinese Taipei (TPE)	3	1	3	7
3	Vietnam (VIE)	1	2	3	6
4	Iran (IRI)	1	1	3	5
5	Thailand (THA)	0	3	5	8
6	Jordan (JOR)	0	3	1	4
7	China (CHN)	0	1	4	5
8	Philippines (PHI)	0	1	3	4
9	Indonesia (INA)	0	1	2	3
9	Nepal (NEP)	0	1	2	3
11	Malaysia (MAS)	0	1	1	2
12	Japan (JPN)	0	0	2	2
12	Kazakhstan (KAZ)	0	0	2	2
14	Kuwait (KUW)	0	0	1	1
Totals (14 entries)		16	16	32	64
