= 1994 Asian Taekwondo Championships =

Taekwondo competition

- Venue: Ninoy Aquino Stadium
- Location: Manila, Philippines
- Dates: 28–30 January 1994

Champions
- Men: South Korea
- Women: South Korea

The 1994 Asian Taekwondo Championships are the 11th edition of the Asian Taekwondo Championships, and were held at the Ninoy Aquino Stadium, Rizal Memorial Sports Complex. Manila, Philippines from 28 January to 30 January, 1994.

South Korea dominated the competition and won eleven gold medals, Chinese Taipei won four all of them in women's competition and the host nation Philippines won the remaining gold medal.

== Medal summary ==
=== Men ===
Event	Gold	Silver	Bronze
Finweight −50 kg	Choi Yong-hoon; South Korea	Ali Rahimzadeh; Iran	Roberto Cruz; Philippines
Finweight −50 kg	Choi Yong-hoon; South Korea	Ali Rahimzadeh; Iran	Tan Kok Chen; Malaysia
Flyweight −54 kg	Ko Dong-wan; South Korea	Mohsen Shirzad; Iran	Lugi Riyandi; Indonesia
Flyweight −54 kg	Ko Dong-wan; South Korea	Mohsen Shirzad; Iran	Kumar Sukalingam; Malaysia
Bantamweight −58 kg	Kim Hyun-yong; South Korea	Walter Dean Vargas; Philippines	Alf Dell'orso; Australia
Bantamweight −58 kg	Kim Hyun-yong; South Korea	Walter Dean Vargas; Philippines	Adel Saleh Isa; Bahrain
Featherweight −64 kg	Yang Jae-cheol; South Korea	Yao Ching-fu; Chinese Taipei	Robert Vargas; Philippines
Featherweight −64 kg	Yang Jae-cheol; South Korea	Yao Ching-fu; Chinese Taipei	Hiroyuki Yamashita; Japan
Lightweight −70 kg	Jung Kang-chae; South Korea	Wei Cheng-hung; Chinese Taipei	Ramelito Abratique; Philippines
Lightweight −70 kg	Jung Kang-chae; South Korea	Wei Cheng-hung; Chinese Taipei	Vũ Trường Tuấn; Vietnam
Welterweight −76 kg	Ali Atienza; Philippines	Liu Tsu-ien; Chinese Taipei	Nguyễn Đăng Khánh; Vietnam
Welterweight −76 kg	Ali Atienza; Philippines	Liu Tsu-ien; Chinese Taipei	Jeetender Kumar Rai; Malaysia
Middleweight −83 kg	Park Jong-bom; South Korea	Ammar Fahed Sbeihi; Jordan	Majid Amintorabi; Iran
Middleweight −83 kg	Park Jong-bom; South Korea	Ammar Fahed Sbeihi; Jordan	Khalid Al-Harthi; Saudi Arabia
Heavyweight +83 kg	Kim Je-kyoung; South Korea	Farzad Zarakhsh; Iran	Wu Pao-yi; Chinese Taipei
Heavyweight +83 kg	Kim Je-kyoung; South Korea	Farzad Zarakhsh; Iran	Faras Talal; Kuwait

=== Women ===
Event	Gold	Silver	Bronze
Finweight −43 kg	Lo Yueh-ying; Chinese Taipei	Dayang Atika; Malaysia	Nguyễn Thị Như Phước; Vietnam
Finweight −43 kg	Lo Yueh-ying; Chinese Taipei	Dayang Atika; Malaysia	Yang So-hee; South Korea
Flyweight −47 kg	Lee Sun-yeong; South Korea	Sangina Baidya; Nepal	Elaine Azenith Ong; Philippines
Flyweight −47 kg	Lee Sun-yeong; South Korea	Sangina Baidya; Nepal	Vicki Cenere; Australia
Bantamweight −51 kg	Jin Yong-soon; South Korea	Tang Hui-wen; Chinese Taipei	Tricia Pugeda; Philippines
Bantamweight −51 kg	Jin Yong-soon; South Korea	Tang Hui-wen; Chinese Taipei	Nguyễn Thị Thu Thủy; Vietnam
Featherweight −55 kg	Liu Chao-ching; Chinese Taipei	Shin Dong-sun; South Korea	Alex Van Horssen; Australia
Featherweight −55 kg	Liu Chao-ching; Chinese Taipei	Shin Dong-sun; South Korea	Rita Ellis; Indonesia
Lightweight −60 kg	Chen Yi-an; Chinese Taipei	Nelia Sy; Philippines	Kang Hae-eun; South Korea
Lightweight −60 kg	Chen Yi-an; Chinese Taipei	Nelia Sy; Philippines	Voppy Trisnawati; Indonesia
Welterweight −65 kg	Pan Li-chi; Chinese Taipei	Yoriko Okamoto; Japan	Cho Hyang-mi; South Korea
Welterweight −65 kg	Pan Li-chi; Chinese Taipei	Yoriko Okamoto; Japan	Lydia Zakkas; Australia
Middleweight −70 kg	Park Sun-mi; South Korea	Hsu Ju-ya; Chinese Taipei	Marites Javier; Philippines
Middleweight −70 kg	Park Sun-mi; South Korea	Hsu Ju-ya; Chinese Taipei	Ong Bee Lan; Singapore
Heavyweight +70 kg	Kim Tae-hee; South Korea	Anis Dewi; Indonesia	Cheong May Inn; Singapore
Heavyweight +70 kg	Kim Tae-hee; South Korea	Anis Dewi; Indonesia	Beatriz Tioseco; Philippines

== Medal table ==
Rank	Nation	Gold	Silver	Bronze	Total
1	South Korea	11	1	3	15
2	Chinese Taipei	4	5	1	10
3	Philippines	1	2	7	10
4	Iran	0	3	1	4
5	Indonesia	0	1	3	4
5	Malaysia	0	1	3	4
7	Japan	0	1	1	2
8	Jordan	0	1	0	1
8	Nepal	0	1	0	1
10	Australia	0	0	4	4
10	Vietnam	0	0	4	4
12	Singapore	0	0	2	2
13	Bahrain	0	0	1	1
13	Kuwait	0	0	1	1
13	Saudi Arabia	0	0	1	1
Totals (15 entries)		16	16	32	64
