= Yerlisu =

Yerlisu is a Turkish surname. Notable people with the surname include:

- Gülnur Yerlisu (born 1968), Turkish taekwondo practitioner, sister of Tennur
- Tennur Yerlisu (born 1966), Turkish taekwondo practitioner and coach

== See also ==
- Yerlisu, Keşan
