= Tang Hui-wen =

Taiwanese taekwondo practitioner

Personal information
- Nationality: Taiwanese
- Born: 26 November 1972 (age 53)

Sport
- Sport: Taekwondo
Medal record
Representing Chinese Taipei
Women's taekwondo
World Championships
Gold medal – first place	1993 New York City	Bantamweight
Bronze medal – third place	1991 Athens	Flyweight
Asian Championships
Gold medal – first place	1996 Melbourne	-51 kg
Silver medal – second place	1992 Kuala Lumpur	-47 kg
Silver medal – second place	1994 Manila	-51 kg
Asian Games
Gold medal – first place	1998 Bangkok	-47 kg

Tang Hui-wen (born 26 November 1972) is a Taiwanese taekwondo practitioner.

She won a gold medal in bantamweight at the 1993 World Taekwondo Championships in New York City, defeating Won Sun-jin in the semifinal and Elisabet Delgado in the final. She won a gold medal at the 1996 Asian Taekwondo Championships, and a gold medal at the 1998 Asian Games.
