= 1992 Asian Taekwondo Championships =

Taekwondo competition

- Venue: Stadium Negara
- Location: Kuala Lumpur, Malaysia
- Dates: 31 January – 2 February 1992

Champions
- Men: South Korea
- Women: South Korea

The 1992 Asian Taekwondo Championships are the 10th edition of the Asian Taekwondo Championships, and were held at the Stadium Negara, Kuala Lumpur, Malaysia from 31 January to 2 February, 1992.

South Korea finished first in medal table after winning eleven gold medals.

== Medal summary ==
=== Men ===
Event	Gold	Silver	Bronze
Finweight −50 kg	Chang Jung-san; Chinese Taipei	Jin Seung-tae; South Korea	John Suhartono; Indonesia
Finweight −50 kg	Chang Jung-san; Chinese Taipei	Jin Seung-tae; South Korea	Kumar Sandragasam; Malaysia
Flyweight −54 kg	Seo Sung-kyo; South Korea	Dirc Richard Talumewo; Indonesia	Khalid Al-Hubaidah; Kuwait
Flyweight −54 kg	Seo Sung-kyo; South Korea	Dirc Richard Talumewo; Indonesia	Lin Yeong-cheng; Chinese Taipei
Bantamweight −58 kg	Kwon Tae-ho; South Korea	Hussein Makki; Jordan	Yeung Wai Kwan; Hong Kong
Bantamweight −58 kg	Kwon Tae-ho; South Korea	Hussein Makki; Jordan	Asghar Tahmasebi; Iran
Featherweight −64 kg	Kang Chang-mo; South Korea	Chou Kuei-ming; Chinese Taipei	Khalid Al-Shamrani; Saudi Arabia
Featherweight −64 kg	Kang Chang-mo; South Korea	Chou Kuei-ming; Chinese Taipei	Bijan Moghanloo; Iran
Lightweight −70 kg	Fariborz Askari; Iran	Bandar Al-Jammaz; Saudi Arabia	Dasantyo Prihadi; Indonesia
Lightweight −70 kg	Fariborz Askari; Iran	Bandar Al-Jammaz; Saudi Arabia	Noel Veneracion; Philippines
Welterweight −76 kg	Lim Yong-ho; South Korea	Liu Tsu-ien; Chinese Taipei	Ali Mohammad Boshagh; Iran
Welterweight −76 kg	Lim Yong-ho; South Korea	Liu Tsu-ien; Chinese Taipei	Nigel Anderson; Australia
Middleweight −83 kg	Yoon Soon-cheol; South Korea	Ho Ming-hsiung; Chinese Taipei	Khalid Al-Harthi; Saudi Arabia
Middleweight −83 kg	Yoon Soon-cheol; South Korea	Ho Ming-hsiung; Chinese Taipei	Hossein Abbasi; Iran
Heavyweight +83 kg	Kim Je-kyoung; South Korea	Hassan Aslani; Iran	Wu Pao-yi; Chinese Taipei
Heavyweight +83 kg	Kim Je-kyoung; South Korea	Hassan Aslani; Iran	Apolonio Centron; Philippines

=== Women ===
Event	Gold	Silver	Bronze
Finweight −43 kg	Lee Sun-yeong; South Korea	Lo Yueh-ying; Chinese Taipei	Sita Kumari Rai; Nepal
Finweight −43 kg	Lee Sun-yeong; South Korea	Lo Yueh-ying; Chinese Taipei	Vasugi Maruthamuthu; Malaysia
Flyweight −47 kg	Mo Sun-young; South Korea	Tang Hui-wen; Chinese Taipei	Wong Liang Ming; Singapore
Flyweight −47 kg	Mo Sun-young; South Korea	Tang Hui-wen; Chinese Taipei	Anita Falieros; Australia
Bantamweight −51 kg	Won Sun-jin; South Korea	Chen Mei-hua; Chinese Taipei	Vicki Cenere; Australia
Bantamweight −51 kg	Won Sun-jin; South Korea	Chen Mei-hua; Chinese Taipei	Nelia Sy; Philippines
Featherweight −55 kg	Liu Chao-ching; Chinese Taipei	Kim Sung-sook; South Korea	Bea Lucero; Philippines
Featherweight −55 kg	Liu Chao-ching; Chinese Taipei	Kim Sung-sook; South Korea	Su Su Hlaing; Myanmar
Lightweight −60 kg	Jeong Eun-ok; South Korea	Hsien Feng-lien; Chinese Taipei	Donna Scherp; New Zealand
Lightweight −60 kg	Jeong Eun-ok; South Korea	Hsien Feng-lien; Chinese Taipei	Maria Lourdes Go; Philippines
Welterweight −65 kg	Pan Li-chi; Chinese Taipei	Susilawati; Indonesia	Foo Yong Lai; Singapore
Welterweight −65 kg	Pan Li-chi; Chinese Taipei	Susilawati; Indonesia	Catherine Ditan; Philippines
Middleweight −70 kg	Lee Sun-hee; South Korea	Lau Choo Boon; Malaysia	Julie Phillips; Australia
Middleweight −70 kg	Lee Sun-hee; South Korea	Lau Choo Boon; Malaysia	Anis Dewi; Indonesia
Heavyweight +70 kg	Sarah Chung; Malaysia	Jung Myoung-sook; South Korea	Susan Graham; New Zealand
Heavyweight +70 kg	Sarah Chung; Malaysia	Jung Myoung-sook; South Korea	Beatriz Tioseco; Philippines

== Medal table ==
Rank	Nation	Gold	Silver	Bronze	Total
1	South Korea	11	3	0	14
2	Chinese Taipei	3	7	2	12
3	Iran	1	1	4	6
4	Malaysia	1	1	2	4
5	Indonesia	0	2	3	5
6	Saudi Arabia	0	1	2	3
7	Jordan	0	1	0	1
8	Philippines	0	0	7	7
9	Australia	0	0	4	4
10	New Zealand	0	0	2	2
10	Singapore	0	0	2	2
12	Hong Kong	0	0	1	1
12	Kuwait	0	0	1	1
12	Myanmar	0	0	1	1
12	Nepal	0	0	1	1
Totals (15 entries)		16	16	32	64
