= Huang Hsiao-ying =

Taiwanese taekwondo practitioner

Personal information
- Nationality: Taiwanese
- Born: 3 July 1974 (age 51)

Sport
- Sport: Taekwondo
Medal record
Representing Chinese Taipei
Women's taekwondo
World Championships
Bronze medal – third place	1995 Manila	Heavyweight

Huang Hsiao-ying (born 3 July 1974) is a Taiwanese taekwondo practitioner. She competed at the 1993 World Taekwondo Championships, where she was defeated by eventual world champion Jung Myoung-sook in the 8th-final. She won a bronze medal in heavyweight at the 1995 World Taekwondo Championships in Manila, after being defeated by Jung Myoung-sook in the semifinal.
