= Kao Ching-yi =

Taiwanese taekwondo practitioner

Personal information
- Nationality: Taiwanese

Sport
- Sport: Taekwondo
Medal record
Representing Chinese Taipei
Women's taekwondo
World Championships
Gold medal – first place	1999 Edmonton	Heavyweight
Asian Championships
Silver medal – second place	1998 Ho Chi Minh City	+70 kg
Asian Games
Bronze medal – third place	1998 Bangkok	Welterweight

Kao Ching-yi is a Taiwanese taekwondo practitioner.

She won a gold medal in heavyweight at the 1999 World Taekwondo Championships in Edmonton, after defeating Laurence Rase in the semifinal, and Dominique Bosshart in the final. She won a silver medal at the 1998 Asian Taekwondo Championships, a bronze medal at the 1998 Asian Games, and took 1st at the 1998 U.S. Open defeating Nicki Carlson-Lee in the finals.
