= 1991 World Taekwondo Championships =

Taekwondo competition

- Venue: Peace and Friendship Stadium
- Location: Athens, Greece
- Dates: 28 October – 3 November 1991

Champions
- Men: South Korea
- Women: South Korea

The 1991 World Taekwondo Championships were the 10th edition of the World Taekwondo Championships, and were held in Athens from October 28 to November 3, 1991, with 434 athletes participating from 49 countries.

== Medal summary ==
=== Men ===
Event	Gold	Silver	Bronze
Finweight (−50 kg)	Gergely Salim; Denmark	Chang Jung-san; Chinese Taipei	Sirous Rezaei; Iran
Finweight (−50 kg)	Gergely Salim; Denmark	Chang Jung-san; Chinese Taipei	Kang Cheol-woo; South Korea
Flyweight (−54 kg)	Kim Cheol-ho; South Korea	József Salim; Denmark	Gabriel Esparza; Spain
Flyweight (−54 kg)	Kim Cheol-ho; South Korea	József Salim; Denmark	Django Tapilatu; Netherlands
Bantamweight (−58 kg)	Ángel Alonso; Spain	Sayed Najem; Canada	Seon Sang-joon; South Korea
Bantamweight (−58 kg)	Ángel Alonso; Spain	Sayed Najem; Canada	Ekrem Boyalı; Turkey
Featherweight (−64 kg)	Jang Hyuk; South Korea	Stephen Tapilatu; Netherlands	Jorge Gonçalves; Brazil
Featherweight (−64 kg)	Jang Hyuk; South Korea	Stephen Tapilatu; Netherlands	Tamer Abdelmoneim Hussein; Egypt
Lightweight (−70 kg)	Yang Dae-seung; South Korea	Ramelito Abratique; Philippines	John Collison; Australia
Lightweight (−70 kg)	Yang Dae-seung; South Korea	Ramelito Abratique; Philippines	Hiang Ming-jen; Chinese Taipei
Welterweight (−76 kg)	Park Yong-woon; South Korea	James Villasana; United States	Hisashi Kondo; Japan
Welterweight (−76 kg)	Park Yong-woon; South Korea	James Villasana; United States	Hugo García; Mexico
Middleweight (−83 kg)	Yoon Soon-cheol; South Korea	Yehia Alam; Egypt	Herbert Perez; United States
Middleweight (−83 kg)	Yoon Soon-cheol; South Korea	Yehia Alam; Egypt	Metin Şahin; Turkey
Heavyweight (+83 kg)	Tonny Sørensen; Denmark	Oliver Schawe; Germany	Miguel Jordán; Spain
Heavyweight (+83 kg)	Tonny Sørensen; Denmark	Oliver Schawe; Germany	Amr Khairy; Egypt

=== Women ===
Event	Gold	Silver	Bronze
Finweight (−43 kg)	Elisabet Delgado; Spain	Gülnur Yerlisu; Turkey	Wu Shan-chen; Chinese Taipei
Finweight (−43 kg)	Elisabet Delgado; Spain	Gülnur Yerlisu; Turkey	Kim Jin-seong; South Korea
Flyweight (−47 kg)	Arzu Tan; Turkey	Anita van der Pas; Netherlands	Mariela Valenzuela; Argentina
Flyweight (−47 kg)	Arzu Tan; Turkey	Anita van der Pas; Netherlands	Tang Hui-wen; Chinese Taipei
Bantamweight (−51 kg)	Park Dong-seon; South Korea	Döndü Şahin; Turkey	Kathy Walker; Great Britain
Bantamweight (−51 kg)	Park Dong-seon; South Korea	Döndü Şahin; Turkey	Rosario Solís; Spain
Featherweight (−55 kg)	Tung Ya-ling; Chinese Taipei	Ayşegül Ergin; Turkey	Josefina López; Spain
Featherweight (−55 kg)	Tung Ya-ling; Chinese Taipei	Ayşegül Ergin; Turkey	Azza Adel; Egypt
Lightweight (−60 kg)	Jeong Eun-ok; South Korea	Chen Yi-an; Chinese Taipei	Minouschka Thielman; Netherlands
Lightweight (−60 kg)	Jeong Eun-ok; South Korea	Chen Yi-an; Chinese Taipei	Dolores Knoll; Mexico
Welterweight (−65 kg)	Arlene Limas; United States	Coral Bistuer; Spain	Cho Hyang-mi; South Korea
Welterweight (−65 kg)	Arlene Limas; United States	Coral Bistuer; Spain	Morfou Drosidou; Greece
Middleweight (−70 kg)	Yang In-deok; South Korea	Chavela Aaron; United States	Mónica del Real; Mexico
Middleweight (−70 kg)	Yang In-deok; South Korea	Chavela Aaron; United States	Theano Ketesidou; Greece
Heavyweight (+70 kg)	Lynnette Love; United States	Yvonne Franssen; Canada	Anna Widehov; Sweden
Heavyweight (+70 kg)	Lynnette Love; United States	Yvonne Franssen; Canada	Bettina Hipf; Germany

== Medal table ==
Rank	Nation	Gold	Silver	Bronze	Total
1	South Korea	8	0	4	12
2	United States	2	2	1	5
3	Spain	2	1	4	7
4	Denmark	2	1	0	3
5	Turkey	1	3	2	6
6	Chinese Taipei	1	2	3	6
7	Netherlands	0	2	2	4
8	Canada	0	2	0	2
9	Egypt	0	1	3	4
10	Germany	0	1	1	2
11	Philippines	0	1	0	1
12	Mexico	0	0	3	3
13	Greece	0	0	2	2
14	Argentina	0	0	1	1
14	Australia	0	0	1	1
14	Brazil	0	0	1	1
14	Great Britain	0	0	1	1
14	Iran	0	0	1	1
14	Japan	0	0	1	1
14	Sweden	0	0	1	1
Totals (20 entries)		16	16	32	64
