= Yvonne Franssen =

Canadian taekwondo practitioner

Personal information
- Nationality: Canadian

Sport
- Sport: Taekwondo
Medal record
Representing Canada
Women's taekwondo
World Championships
Silver medal – second place	1989 Seoul	Heavyweight
Silver medal – second place	1991 Athens	Heavyweight
Pan American Championships
Gold medal – first place	1992 Colorado Springs	+70 kg
Silver medal – second place	1990 Bayamon	+70 kg
Bronze medal – third place	1988 Lima	+70 kg

Yvonne Franssen is a Canadian taekwondo practitioner.

She won a silver medal in heavyweight at the 1989 World Taekwondo Championships in Seoul, after being defeated by Jung Wan-sook in the final. She won a silver medal in heavyweight at the 1991 World Taekwondo Championships, after being defeated by Lynnette Love in the final. She won a gold medal at the 1992 Pan American Taekwondo Championships, a silver medal in 1990, and a bronze medal in 1988.
