= Nicki Carlson-Lee =

American martial artist

Nicki Carlson-Lee (born on August 24th, 1974) is a martial artist from Anderson, South Carolina. She competed in karate point fighting and taekwondo.

== Early life ==
Nicki Carlson-Lee began her martial arts training at the age of 9 at Marty Knight's Karate school in Anderson. She was a prodigious talent, competing in women's adult Black Belt competitions by the time she was 13 years old. She graduated from T. L. Hanna High School in 1991. She attended Anderson College before transferring to USC-Spartanburg.

== Martial Arts Career ==
Nicki became one of the most dominant female martial artists of her era, achieving success in both karate point fighting and Olympic-style taekwondo.

She was a dominant force on the North American Sport Karate Association (NASKA) circuit for years and is considered one the greatest female karate point fighters of all time. Her accolades are extensive, including being a record eight-time NASKA Diamond Nationals Overall Grand Champion (1990, 1991, 1994, 1995, 1996, 1997, 1999, 2000). She won numerous other major tournament titles, such as the U.S. Capitol Classics in 1994, 1996 and 1997, U.S. Open in 1994, 1996 and 1997, Bluegrass Nationals in 1996 and 1997, Compete International in 1997, and Battle of Atlanta in 1999. She was undefeated with seven straight grand championships in 1998 and returned in 2000 to win nine straight, earning her the award for "Best Overall Women's Sports Karate Fighter of the Decade" for the 1990s. She was known for her reach, technique, flexibility, speed, strength, intelligence, and patience.

To pursue her Olympic dream, she transitioned to taekwondo, earning a black belt in the discipline. In 1998, she qualified for and became a member of the U.S. National Taekwondo Team, winning the women's heavyweight division at the U.S. National Team Trials, taking bronze at the 1998 Pan American Taekwondo Championships, and bronze at the National Taekwondo Championships, as well as taking 2nd at the U.S. Open losing to Kao Ching-yi in the finals. She trained at the U.S. Olympic Training Center in Colorado Springs with the goal of making the 2000 Summer Olympics in Sydney. Her Olympic dream was thwarted when the governing body decided to only select two women, excluding her heavyweight division.

== Life After Competition ==
Following her competitive career, Nicki, alongside her husband and fellow martial artist Rick Lee, focused on their business, Spartanburg Martial Arts. She began teaching at the school in 1992 and became a co-owner and chief instructor. She is a 5th-degree black belt and was instrumental in building the school into one of the premier karate training programs in the Southeast, with hundreds of students across multiple locations. Her post-competition goal was to be a positive influence and role model for her students, showing them what can be achieved through martial arts. She stated that competing helped set an example for them.
