= Meng Mei-chun =

Taiwanese taekwondo practitioner

Personal information
- Nationality: Taiwanese
- Born: 7 July 1977 (age 48)

Sport
- Sport: Taekwondo
Medal record
Representing Chinese Taipei
Women's taekwondo
World Championships
Bronze medal – third place	1999 Edmonton	Bantamweight
Asian Championships
Bronze medal – third place	1996 Melbourne	-55 kg

Meng Mei-chun (born 7 July 1977) is a Taiwanese taekwondo practitioner. She won a bronze medal in bantamweight at the 1999 World Taekwondo Championships in Edmonton, after being defeated by Jung Jae-eun in the semi-final. She also won a bronze medal at the 1996 Asian Taekwondo Championships.
