= Tanya White =

Australian taekwondo practitioner (born 1972)

Personal information
- Nationality: Australian
- Born: 22 April 1972 (age 54) Adelaide, Australia

Sport
- Sport: Taekwondo
Medal record
Representing Australia
Women's taekwondo
Asian Championships
Silver medal – second place	1996 Melbourne	Heavyweight

Tanya White (born 22 April 1972) is an Australian taekwondo practitioner, born in Adelaide.

== Playing career ==
She competed at the 2000 Summer Olympics in Sydney. She won a silver medal in heavyweight at the 1996 Asian Taekwondo Championships in Melbourne.
