= Yang In-deok =

South Korean taekwondo practitioner

Personal information
- Nationality: South Korean

Sport
- Sport: Taekwondo
Medal record
Representing South Korea
Women's taekwondo
World Championships
Gold medal – first place	1991 Athens	Middleweight

Yang In-deok (Korean: 양인덕) is a South Korean taekwondo practitioner.

She won a gold medal in middleweight at the 1991 World Taekwondo Championships in Athens, after defeating Chavela Aaron in the final.
