= Lisa O'Keefe =

Australian taekwondo practitioner

Personal information
- Nationality: Australian
- Born: 30 August 1973 (age 52) Warrnambool, Australia

Sport
- Sport: Taekwondo
Medal record
Representing Australia
Women's taekwondo
World Championships
Bronze medal – third place	1999 Edmonton	Lightweight

Lisa O'Keefe (born 30 August 1973) is an Australian taekwondo practitioner, born in Warrnambool. She competed at the 2000 Summer Olympics in Sydney. She won a bronze medal in lightweight at the 1999 World Taekwondo Championships, after being defeated by Cho Hyang-mi in the semifinal.
