= Lee Wan Yuen =

Malaysian taekwondo practitioner

Personal information
- Nationality: Malaysian
- Born: 20 November 1977 (age 48) Kuala Lumpur, Malaysia

Sport
- Sport: Taekwondo
Medal record
Representing Malaysia
Women's taekwondo
Asian Games
Silver medal – second place	1998 Bangkok	Heavyweight
Bronze medal – third place	2002 Busan	Heavyweight
Asian Championships
Bronze medal – third place	1996 Melbourne	Heavyweight
Bronze medal – third place	1998 Ho Chi Minh City	Heavyweight

Lee Wan Yuen (born 20 November 1977) is a Malaysian taekwondo practitioner from Kuala Lumpur.

She competed at the 2000 Summer Olympics in Sydney. She won a silver medal in heavyweight at the 1998 Asian Games in Bangkok, and a bronze medal at the 2002 Asian Games. She won a bronze medal at the 1996 Asian Taekwondo Championships in Melbourne.
