= Park Dong-seon =

South Korean taekwondo practitioner

Personal information
- Nationality: South Korean

Sport
- Sport: Taekwondo
Medal record
Representing South Korea
Women's taekwondo
World Championships
Gold medal – first place	1991 Athens	Bantamweight

Park Dong-seon is a South Korean taekwondo practitioner.

She won a gold medal in bantamweight at the 1991 World Taekwondo Championships in Athens, by defeating Kathy Walker in the semifinal, and Döndü Şahin in the final.
