= Hsu Ju-ya =

Taiwanese taekwondo practitioner

Personal information
- Nationality: Taiwanese

Sport
- Sport: Taekwondo
Medal record
Representing Chinese Taipei
Women's taekwondo
World Championships
Bronze medal – third place	1989 Seoul	Middleweight
Bronze medal – third place	1993 New York City	Middleweight
Asian Championships
Silver medal – second place	1994 Manila	-70 kg

Hsu Ju-ya is a Taiwanese taekwondo practitioner. She won a bronze medal in middleweight at the 1989 World Taekwondo Championships, and a bronze medal at the 1993 World Taekwondo Championships. She won a silver medal at the 1994 Asian Taekwondo Championships.
