= Belén Asensio =

Spanish taekwondo practitioner

Medal record

Representing Spain

Women's taekwondo

World Championships
Gold medal – first place	1999 Edmonton	Finweight
Gold medal – first place	2005 Madrid	Finweight

European Championships
Gold medal – first place	2000 Patras	Finweight
Gold medal – first place	2006 Bonn	Finweight

Belén Asensio (born December 21, 1976) is a female taekwondo practitioner from Spain.

She won the gold medal in the finweight (-47 kg) class at the 1999 World Taekwondo Championships in Edmonton, Alberta, Canada. Asensio won the gold medal again in finweight at the 2005 World Taekwondo Championships in Madrid, defeating Sümeyye Gülec of Germany 4-2 in the semifinal and You Eun-Young of South Korea 4-1 in the final.

She is also a two-time European Champion in 2000 and 2006. However, she has not qualified for any of the past three Olympics (2000, 2004 and 2008), losing her spot for the 2004 and 2008 Olympics to Spanish rival Brigitte Yagüe at the Spanish Olympic trials.
