= 1999 World Taekwondo Championships =

Taekwondo competition

- Venue: Universiade Pavilion
- Location: Edmonton, Canada
- Dates: 2–6 June 1999

Champions
- Men: South Korea
- Women: South Korea

The 1999 World Taekwondo Championships were the 14th edition of the World Taekwondo Championships, and were held in Butterdome, University of Alberta in Edmonton, Canada from 2 to 6 June 1999, with 550 athletes participating from 66 countries.

== Medal table ==
* Host nation (Canada)

Rank	Nation	Gold	Silver	Bronze	Total
1	South Korea	9	4	0	13
2	Spain	2	1	6	9
3	Chinese Taipei	2	0	4	6
4	Iran	2	0	0	2
5	China	1	1	2	4
6	Turkey	0	3	2	5
7	Denmark	0	2	0	2
8	Canada*	0	1	2	3
9	France	0	1	1	2
9	Mexico	0	1	1	2
11	Netherlands	0	1	0	1
11	Philippines	0	1	0	1
13	Australia	0	0	2	2
13	Russia	0	0	2	2
13	United States	0	0	2	2
16	Belgium	0	0	1	1
16	Chile	0	0	1	1
16	Dominican Republic	0	0	1	1
16	Germany	0	0	1	1
16	Kazakhstan	0	0	1	1
16	Morocco	0	0	1	1
16	Switzerland	0	0	1	1
16	Vietnam	0	0	1	1
Totals (23 entries)		16	16	32	64

== Medal summary ==
=== Men ===
Event	Gold	Silver	Bronze
Finweight (−54 kg)	Min Byeong-seok; South Korea	Roberto Cruz; Philippines	Gabriel Mercedes; Dominican Republic
Finweight (−54 kg)	Min Byeong-seok; South Korea	Roberto Cruz; Philippines	Chen Wei-chun; Chinese Taipei
Flyweight (−58 kg)	Yoon Jong-il; South Korea	Abror Haider; Denmark	Younes Sekkat; Morocco
Flyweight (−58 kg)	Yoon Jong-il; South Korea	Abror Haider; Denmark	Hồ Nhất Thống; Vietnam
Bantamweight (−62 kg)	Ko Dae-kyu; South Korea	Ahmet Evcimen; Turkey	Mark López; United States
Bantamweight (−62 kg)	Ko Dae-kyu; South Korea	Ahmet Evcimen; Turkey	Ivan Ron; Spain
Featherweight (−67 kg)	No Hyun-goo; South Korea	Jesper Roesen; Denmark	Francisco Zas; Spain
Featherweight (−67 kg)	No Hyun-goo; South Korea	Jesper Roesen; Denmark	Hsu Chi-hung; Chinese Taipei
Lightweight (−72 kg)	Hadi Saei; Iran	Kim Byung-uk; South Korea	Sergio Cárdenas; Chile
Lightweight (−72 kg)	Hadi Saei; Iran	Kim Byung-uk; South Korea	Rosendo Alonso; Spain
Welterweight (−78 kg)	Jang Jong-oh; South Korea	Bahri Tanrıkulu; Turkey	Rodrigo Martínez; Mexico
Welterweight (−78 kg)	Jang Jong-oh; South Korea	Bahri Tanrıkulu; Turkey	Josh Coleman; United States
Middleweight (−84 kg)	Majid Aflaki; Iran	Yasin Yağız; Turkey	Adilkhan Sagindykov; Kazakhstan
Middleweight (−84 kg)	Majid Aflaki; Iran	Yasin Yağız; Turkey	Faissal Ebnoutalib; Germany
Heavyweight (+84 kg)	Moon Dae-sung; South Korea	Moctar Doumbia; France	Daniel Trenton; Australia
Heavyweight (+84 kg)	Moon Dae-sung; South Korea	Moctar Doumbia; France	Rubén Montesinos; Spain

=== Women ===
Event	Gold	Silver	Bronze
Finweight (−47 kg)	Belén Asensio; Spain	Yoon Song-hee; South Korea	France Pouzoulet; France
Finweight (−47 kg)	Belén Asensio; Spain	Yoon Song-hee; South Korea	Kadriye Selimoğlu; Turkey
Flyweight (−51 kg)	Chi Shu-ju; Chinese Taipei	Shim Hye-young; South Korea	Jennifer Delgado; Spain
Flyweight (−51 kg)	Chi Shu-ju; Chinese Taipei	Shim Hye-young; South Korea	Yuan Guiru; China
Bantamweight (−55 kg)	Wang Su; China	Jung Jae-eun; South Korea	Meng Mei-chun; Chinese Taipei
Bantamweight (−55 kg)	Wang Su; China	Jung Jae-eun; South Korea	Christiana Bach; Switzerland
Featherweight (−59 kg)	Kang Hae-eun; South Korea	Iridia Salazar; Mexico	Gaël Texier; Canada
Featherweight (−59 kg)	Kang Hae-eun; South Korea	Iridia Salazar; Mexico	Sonia Reyes; Spain
Lightweight (−63 kg)	Cho Hyang-mi; South Korea	Zhang Huijing; China	Lisa O'Keefe; Australia
Lightweight (−63 kg)	Cho Hyang-mi; South Korea	Zhang Huijing; China	Ekaterina Noskova; Russia
Welterweight (−67 kg)	Elena Benítez; Spain	Mirjam Müskens; Netherlands	Chang Wan-chen; Chinese Taipei
Welterweight (−67 kg)	Elena Benítez; Spain	Mirjam Müskens; Netherlands	Barbara Pak; Canada
Middleweight (−72 kg)	Kim Yoon-kyung; South Korea	Ibone Lallana; Spain	Chen Zhong; China
Middleweight (−72 kg)	Kim Yoon-kyung; South Korea	Ibone Lallana; Spain	Filiz Nur Aydın; Turkey
Heavyweight (+72 kg)	Kao Ching-yi; Chinese Taipei	Dominique Bosshart; Canada	Maria Konyakhina; Russia
Heavyweight (+72 kg)	Kao Ching-yi; Chinese Taipei	Dominique Bosshart; Canada	Laurence Rase; Belgium

== Team ranking ==
=== Men ===
Rank	Team	Points
1	South Korea	95
2	Iran	43
3	Turkey	38
4	Denmark	35
5	Spain	35

=== Women ===
Rank	Team	Points
1	South Korea	70
2	Spain	51
3	Chinese Taipei	47
4	China	44
5	Canada	29
