= Jeong Eun-ok =

South Korean taekwondo practitioner

Personal information
- Nationality: South Korean

Sport
- Sport: Taekwondo
Medal record
Representing South Korea
Women's taekwondo
World Championships
Gold medal – first place	1991 Athens	Lightweight
Asian Championships
Gold medal – first place	1992 Kuala Lumpur	-60 kg

Jeong Eun-ok is a South Korean taekwondo practitioner.

She won a gold medal in lightweight at the 1991 World Taekwondo Championships in Athens. She won a gold medal at the 1992 Asian Taekwondo Championships.
