= Park Eun-sun (taekwondo) =

South Korean taekwondo practitioner

Personal information
- Nationality: South Korean

Sport
- Sport: Taekwondo
Medal record
Representing South Korea
Women's taekwondo
World Championships
Gold medal – first place	1993 New York City	Middleweight
Asian Championships
Gold medal – first place	1996 Melbourne	-70 kg

Park Eun-sun is a South Korean taekwondo practitioner.

She won the gold medal in the middleweight division at the 1993 World Taekwondo Championships in New York City, defeating Ekaterina Bassi in the final. She also won a gold medal at the 1996 Asian Taekwondo Championships.
