= Ekaterina Bassi =

Greek taekwondo practitioner

Personal information
- Nationality: Greek
- Born: 16 February 1977 (age 49)

Sport
- Sport: Taekwondo
Medal record
Representing Greece
Women's taekwondo
World Championships
| Silver medal – second place | 1993 New York | Middleweight |
European Championships
| Silver medal – second place | 1998 Eindhoven | -72 kg |
| Bronze medal – third place | 1994 Zagreb | -70 kg |

Ekaterina Bassi (born 16 February 1977) is a Greek taekwondo practitioner.

She won a silver medal in middleweight at the 1993 World Taekwondo Championships, after being defeated by Park Eun-sun in the final. Her achievements at the European Taekwondo Championships include a silver medal in 1998 and a bronze medal in 1994.
