= He Lumin =

Chinese taekwondo practitioner

Personal information
- Nationality: Chinese
- Born: 30 October 1981 (age 44) Henan, China

Sport
- Sport: Taekwondo
Medal record
Women's taekwondo
Representing China
Asian Games
Silver medal – second place	1998 Bangkok	Middleweight

He Lumin (Chinese: 賀璐敏, born 30 October 1981), also known as He Luming, is a Chinese taekwondo practitioner.

She won the championship in welterweight at the 2000 Asian Taekwondo Championships in Hong Kong and at the 2000 World Cup Taekwondo in Lyon. She competed at the 2000 Summer Olympics in Sydney. She won a silver medal in middleweight at the 1998 Asian Games in Bangkok.
