= Kang Hae-eun =

South Korean taekwondoin (born 1977)

Personal information
- Nationality: South Korean
- Born: 9 July 1977 (age 48)

Sport
- Sport: Taekwondo
Medal record
Representing South Korea
Women's taekwondo
World Championships
Gold medal – first place	1997 Hong Kong	Lightweight
Gold medal – first place	1999 Edmonton	Featherweight
Asian Championships
Bronze medal – third place	1994 Manila	Lightweight

Kang Hae-eun (born 9 July 1977) is a South Korean taekwondo practitioner.

She won a gold medal in lightweight at the 1997 World Taekwondo Championships in Hong Kong. She won a gold medal in featherweight at the 1999 World Taekwondo Championships in Edmonton.
