= Kim Mi-young (taekwondo) =

South Korean taekwondo practitioner

Personal information
- Nationality: South Korean

Sport
- Sport: Taekwondo
Medal record
Representing South Korea
Women's taekwondo
World Championships
Gold medal – first place	1993 New York City	Welterweight
Asian Championships
Gold medal – first place	1998 Ho Chi Minh City	-65 kg

Kim Mi-young is a South Korean taekwondo practitioner.

She won a gold medal in welterweight at the 1993 World Taekwondo Championships in New York City. She won a gold medal at the 1998 Asian Taekwondo Championships.
