= Ibone Lallana =

Spanish Taekwondo practitioner

Personal information
- Full name: Ibone Lallana del Rio
- Nationality: Spanish
- Born: 15 May 1976 (age 50) Basauri

Sport
- Sport: Taekwondo
Medal record
Women's taekwondo
Representing Spain
World Championships
Silver medal – second place	1999 Edmonton	Middleweight
Bronze medal – third place	2005 Madrid	Welterweight
European Championships
Silver medal – second place	2004 Lillehammer	–67 kg

Ibone Lallana del Rio (Note: In this Spanish name, the first or paternal surname is Lallana and the second or maternal family name is Del Rio.) (born 15 May 1976) is a Spanish Taekwondo practitioner, born in Basauri.

She won a silver medal in middleweight at the 1999 World Taekwondo Championships, and a bronze medal in welterweight at the 2005 World Taekwondo Championships. She won a silver medal at the 2004 European Taekwondo Championships.
