= Nguyễn Thị Xuân Mai =

Vietnamese taekwondo practitioner

Personal information
- Nationality: Vietnamese
- Born: 2 July 1979 (age 46)

Sport
- Sport: Taekwondo
Medal record
Representing Vietnam
Women's taekwondo
Asian Games
Silver medal – second place	1998 Bangkok	Finweight

Nguyễn Thị Xuân Mai (born 2 July 1979) is a Vietnamese taekwondo practitioner.

She competed at the 2000 Summer Olympics in Sydney. She won a silver medal at the 1998 Asian Games in Bangkok.
