= Yang So-hee =

South Korean taekwondo practitioner

Personal information
- Nationality: South Korean
- Born: 8 April 1976 (age 50)

Sport
- Sport: Taekwondo
Medal record
Representing South Korea
Women's taekwondo
World Championships
Gold medal – first place	1997 Hong Kong	Finweight
Silver medal – second place	1995 Manila	Finweight
Asian Championships
Gold medal – first place	1996 Melbourne	Finweight
Bronze medal – third place	1994 Manila	Finweight

Yang So-hee (born 8 April 1976) is a South Korean taekwondo practitioner.

She won a gold medal in finweight at the 1997 World Taekwondo Championships in Hong Kong, and a silver medal at the 1995 World Taekwondo Championships. She won a gold medal in finweight at the 1996 Asian Taekwondo Championships in Melbourne.
