= Ricardo del Real =

Mexican taekwondo practitioner

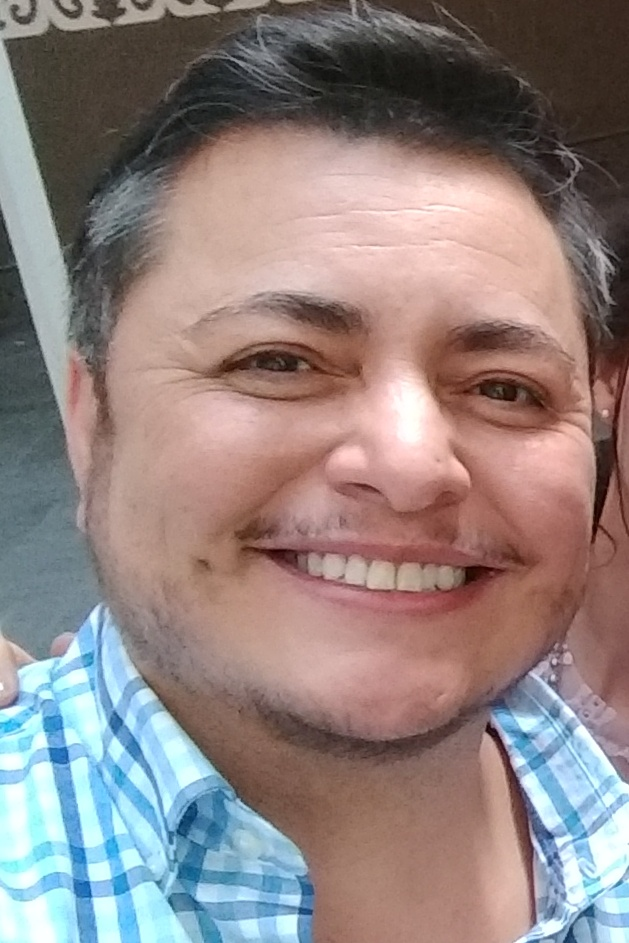
- del Real in 2020

Personal information
- Born: 5 September 1974 (age 51) Aguascalientes, Mexico

Sport
- Sport: Taekwondo
Medal record
Representing Mexico
Women's taekwondo
World Championships
Bronze medal – third place	1991 Athens	Middleweight
Bronze medal – third place	1995 Manila	Middleweight
Bronze medal – third place	1997 Hong Kong	Middleweight

Ricardo del Real (formerly Mónica del Real; born 5 September 1974) is a Mexican taekwondo practitioner, born in Aguascalientes. He competed at the 2000 Summer Olympics in Sydney. In 2019, he came out as a trans man.
