= Morfou Drosidou =

Greek taekwondo practitioner

Personal information
- Nationality: Greek
- Born: 26 April 1974 (age 52)

Sport
- Sport: Taekwondo
Medal record
Representing Greece
Women's taekwondo
World Championships
Silver medal – second place	1993 New York	Welterweight
Silver medal – second place	1997 Hong Kong	Welterweight
Bronze medal – third place	1991 Athens	Welterweight
European Championships
Gold medal – first place	1994 Zagreb	-65 kg
Silver medal – second place	1992 Valencia	-65 kg
Bronze medal – third place	2000 Patra	-67 kg

Morfou Drosidou (born 26 April 1974) is a Greek taekwondo practitioner.

She won a bronze medal in welterweight at the 1991 World Taekwondo Championships, and silver medals at the 1993 World Taekwondo Championships and 1997 World Taekwondo Championships. Her achievements at the European Taekwondo Championships include a gold medal in 1994, a silver medal in 1992, and a bronze medal in 2000.
