= Chen Yi-an =

Taiwanese taekwondo practitioner and actress

Personal information
- Nationality: Taiwanese
- Born: 7 February 1973 (age 53)

Sport
- Sport: Taekwondo
Medal record
Representing Chinese Taipei
Women's taekwondo
World Championships
Silver medal – second place	1991 Athens	Lightweight
Bronze medal – third place	1989 Seoul	Bantamweight
Asian Championships
Gold medal – first place	1994 Manila	-60 kg
Gold medal – first place	1998 Ho Chi Minh City	-60 kg
Asian Games
Gold medal – first place	1998 Bangkok	-55 kg

Chen Yi-an (Chinese: 陳怡安; pinyin: Chén Yí'ān, born 7 February 1973) is a Taiwanese taekwondo practitioner and actress.

She won a bronze medal in bantamweight at the 1989 World Taekwondo Championships, and a silver medal in lightweight at the 1991 World Taekwondo Championships. She won gold medals at the 1994 and 1998 Asian Taekwondo Championships. She won a gold medal at the 1998 Asian Games.

She played the female lead in the 2017 cult film Story in Taipei.

Chen has a bachelor's degree in business administration from National Chengchi University and a master in sports administration from the University of Taipei. As of 2019, she was a doctoral student at National Taiwan Normal University.
