= Tennur Yerlisu =

Turkish taekwondo practitioner

Tennur Yerlisu Lapa
Personal information
- Nationality: Turkish
- Born: Tennur Yerlisu; November 2, 1966 (age 59) Cologne, Germany

Sport
- Country: Turkey
- Sport: Taekwondo
- Event(s): Bantamweight, flyweight, finweight
Medal record
Women's Taekwondo
Representing Turkey
World Championships
Gold medal – first place	1987 Barcelona	Bantamweight
European Championships
Gold medal – first place	1984 Stuttgart	Flyweight
Gold medal – first place	1982 Rome	Finweight
European Cup
Gold medal – first place	1987 Girne	Bantamweight
Gold medal – first place	1986 İzmir	Bantamweight

Tennur Yerlisu Lapa (born Tennur Yerlisu; November 2, 1966) is a former World and European champion Turkish female Taekwondo practitioner. She coached Turkey women's national team. Currently, she is a lecturer of sports science.

She was born on November 2, 1966, in Cologne to a Turkish family in Germany. Tennur Yerlisu studied Germanistik at Istanbul University's Faculty of Letters between 1985 and 1989. In 1993, she received a master's degree in Physical Education and Sports from Marmara University. In 1994, Yerlisu began her doctoral thesis on sports organization and management at Gazi University, receiving a PhD title in 1999.

In 1992, she began an academic career as a research fellow at the College of Sports Sciences and Technologies of Hacettepe University. She went on to lecture at the School of Physical Education and Sports at the Akdeniz University in Antalya in 2009. Her academic interest is all about recreation, on which subject she has publications at national and international level. She is a member of the Sports Science Association.

After coaching the taekwondo team of Üsküdar district from 1990 to 1992, Tennur Yerlisu became coach of the Turkey women's taekwondo national team in 1992-93, and again in 2005.

Her two siblings, sister Gülnur and brother Taner Bekir, are both formerly successful national taekwondo practitioners at World and European level. They run a family-owned company for martial arts equipment.

== Achievements ==
- (gold) 1982 European Championships - Rome, Italy -44 kg
- (gold) 1984 European Championships - Stuttgart, Germany -48 kg
- (gold) 1986 European Cup - İzmir, Turkey -51 kg
- (gold) 1987 European Cup -Girne, Northern Cyprus -51 kg
- (gold) 1987 World Championships - Barcelona, Spain -51 kg

== Honors ==
- Milliyet Sports Awards 1987 Turkish Athlete Of The Year along with Naim Süleymanoğlu
- Hürriyet Erol Simavi Award 1987 Sportsperson of the Year
