= Roberto Cruz (taekwondo) =

Filipino taekwondo practitioner

Roberto "Kitoy" Cruz
Personal information
- Nationality: Filipino
- Born: Roberto Cruz; August 18, 1972 (age 53)

Sport
- Country: Philippines
- Sport: Taekwondo
Medal record
Representing Philippines
Men's taekwondo
World Taekwondo Championships
Silver medal – second place	1995 Manila	Finweight
Silver medal – second place	1997 Hongkong	Finweight
Silver medal – second place	1999 Edmonton	Finweight
Bronze medal – third place	2001 South Korea	Finweight
Bronze medal – third place	2003 Germany	Finweight
World Cup
Bronze medal – third place	1998 Sindelfingen	Finweight
Bronze medal – third place	2001 Ho Chi Minh City	Finweight
Asian Championships
Bronze medal – third place	1994 Manila	Finweight
Silver medal – second place	1996 Melbourne	Finweight
Gold medal – first place	1999 Manila	Finweight
Southeast Asian Games
Gold medal – first place	1991 Philippines	Finweight
Gold medal – first place	1993 Singapore	Finweight
Gold medal – first place	1995 Thailand	Finweight
Gold medal – first place	1997 Indonesia	Finweight
Gold medal – first place	1999 Brunei	Finweight
Gold medal – first place	2001 Malaysia	Finweight
Bronze medal – third place	2003 Vietnam	Finweight

Roberto "Kitoy" Cruz (born August 18, 1972) is a Filipino taekwondo practitioner. He is the most bemedaled taekwondo player in international competition for the Philippines. He competed in the 1990s and was at the tail-end of his career when he competed in the 2000 Sydney Olympics. He currently serves as one of the national coaches for the country.

== Awards and achievements ==
Listed are some of his international achievements:

- 3 Time Silver Medalist - 12th, 13th & 14th - 1995, 1997 & 1999 World Taekwondo Championships
- 2 Bronze Medalist - 15th & 16th - 2001, 2003 World Taekwondo Championships
- 2 Time Bronze Medalist - 1998 & 2001 World Cup Taekwondo Championships
- Gold Medalist - 1999 2nd Asian Olympic Qualifying Tournament
- 2 Time Silver Medalist - 11th, 12th: 1994, 1996 Asian Taekwondo Championships
- 6 Time Gold Medalist - South East Asian Games (Biennial Games 1991–2001)
