= Laurence Rase =

Belgian taekwondo practitioner

Medal record

Women's taekwondo

Representing Belgium

World Championships
Bronze medal – third place	1999 Edmonton	Heavyweight
Bronze medal – third place	2005 Madrid	Heavyweight

European Championships
Gold medal – first place	2006 Bonn	Heavyweight
Bronze medal – third place	1998 Eindhoven	Heavyweight
Bronze medal – third place	2004 Lillehammer	Middleweight

Universiade
Bronze medal – third place	2005 Izmir	Heavyweight

World University Championships
Silver medal – second place	2004 Patras	Heavyweight
Bronze medal – third place	2000 Taiwan	Heavyweight

Laurence Rase (born 4 April 1977 in Mons, Hainaut, Belgium) is a female taekwondo practitioner from Belgium. She is a two-time heavyweight medalist at the World Taekwondo Championships and won the 2006 European Championship in Bonn, Germany. She competed in the 2004 Summer Olympics but was eliminated in the quarterfinals by losing to Natália Falavigna of Brazil 8–4.

Rase served as Performance Director of the Flemish Taekwondo Union from 2010 until 2021.

She is General Director of the Federation de Volleyball Wallonie-Brusselles sinds 2023.

She graduated as Master in Politics in 2001 and Master in Laws in 2007.
