= Gülnur Yerlisu =

Turkish taekwondo practitioner

Personal information
- Nationality: Turkish
- Born: 1969 (age 56–57) Cologne, West Germany

Sport
- Country: Turkey
- Sport: Taekwondo
- Events: Flyweight, finweight
Medal record
Women's taekwondo
World Championships
Silver medal – second place	1991 Athens	Finweight
Bronze medal – third place	1993 New York City	Flyweight
European Championships
Gold medal – first place	1992 Valencia	Finweight

Gülnur Yerlisu (born 1973) is a retired Turkish taekwondo practitioner who competed at international level, becoming European champion and World Championships medalist in the early 1990s.

== Early life and background ==
Yerlisu was born in 1969 in Cologne, then West Germany, to a Turkish family who had settled in the region as part of the labor migration movement. Her siblings, Tennur Yerlisu and Taner Bekir Yerlisu, also became national team taekwondo athletes and later entrepreneurs in the sports equipment sector.

== Career ==
Gülnur Yerlisu began her international taekwondo career competing in the early 1990s and quickly rose to prominence. In 1991, she won a silver medal at the World Taekwondo Championships held in Athens, Greece, competing in the finweight (–43 kg) division. This result marked her as one of Turkey’s leading female taekwondo athletes at the global level.

A year later, Yerlisu reached the pinnacle of her European career by securing the gold medal at the 1992 European Taekwondo Championships in Valencia, Spain. Her victory contributed to increasing the profile of Turkish women in international taekwondo competitions.

Continuing her success, she earned a bronze medal in the 1993 World Taekwondo Championships held in New York City, competing in the flyweight (–47 kg) category.

Apart from world and European championships, she also demonstrated consistent performance in other international tournaments, winning gold medals in the International German Championships in 1990 and 1991 in the –47 kg youth category.

== Personal life ==
Following her retirement from competitive sports, Gülnur Yerlisu transitioned to a teaching career. She remains connected to taekwondo through her family, who operate a martial arts equipment business.
