= Liu Chao-ching =

Taiwanese taekwondo practitioner

Personal information
- Nationality: Taiwanese

Sport
- Sport: Taekwondo
Medal record
Women's taekwondo
Representing Chinese Taipei
World Games
| Gold medal – first place | 1993 Hague | -55 kg |
World Championships
| Silver medal – second place | 1989 Seoul | Lightweight |
Asian Championships
| Gold medal – first place | 1990 Taipei | -60 kg |
| Gold medal – first place | 1992 Kuala Lumpur | -55 kg |
| Gold medal – first place | 1994 Manila | -55 kg |

Liu Chao-ching is a Taiwanese taekwondo practitioner. She won a silver medal in lightweight at the 1989 World Taekwondo Championships. She won a gold medal at the 1993 World Games, and gold medals at the 1990, 1992 and 1994 Asian Taekwondo Championships.
