= Won Sun-jin =

South Korean taekwondo practitioner

Personal information
- Nationality: South Korean
- Born: July 4, 1974 (age 51)

Sport
- Sport: Taekwondo
Medal record
Representing South Korea
Women's taekwondo
World Championships
Gold medal – first place	1989 Seoul	Flyweight
Gold medal – first place	1995 Manila	Bantamweight
Bronze medal – third place	1993 New York City	Bantamweight
Asian Championships
Gold medal – first place	1992 Kuala Lumpur	Bantamweight
Silver medal – second place	1996 Melbourne	Bantamweight

- Won Sun-jin
- Hangul: 원선진
- Hanja: 元善珍
- RR: Won Seonjin
- MR: Wŏn Sŏnjin

Won Sun-jin (Korean: 원선진; born July 4, 1974) is a South Korean taekwondo practitioner.

She won a gold medal in flyweight at the 1989 World Taekwondo Championships in Seoul. She won a bronze medal in bantamweight at the 1993 World Taekwondo Championships in New York City, and a gold medal in bantamweight at the 1995 World Taekwondo Championships in Manila.
