= Wu Shan-chen =

Taiwanese taekwondo practitioner

Personal information
- Nationality: Taiwanese

Sport
- Sport: Taekwondo
Medal record
Women's taekwondo
Representing Chinese Taipei
World Games
Gold medal – first place	1989 Karlsruhe	-47 kg
World Championships
Bronze medal – third place	1991 Athens	Finweight
Bronze medal – third place	1995 Manila	Bantamweight
Asian Championships
Gold medal – first place	1990 Taipei	-43 kg

Wu Shan-chen is a Taiwanese taekwondo practitioner. She won a bronze medal in finweight at the 1991 World Taekwondo Championships, and a bronze medal in bantamweight at the 1995 World Taekwondo Championships. She won a gold medal at the 1989 World Games, and a gold medal at the 1990 Asian Taekwondo Championships.
