= Lynnette Love =

American taekwondo practitioner

Lynnette Alicia Love
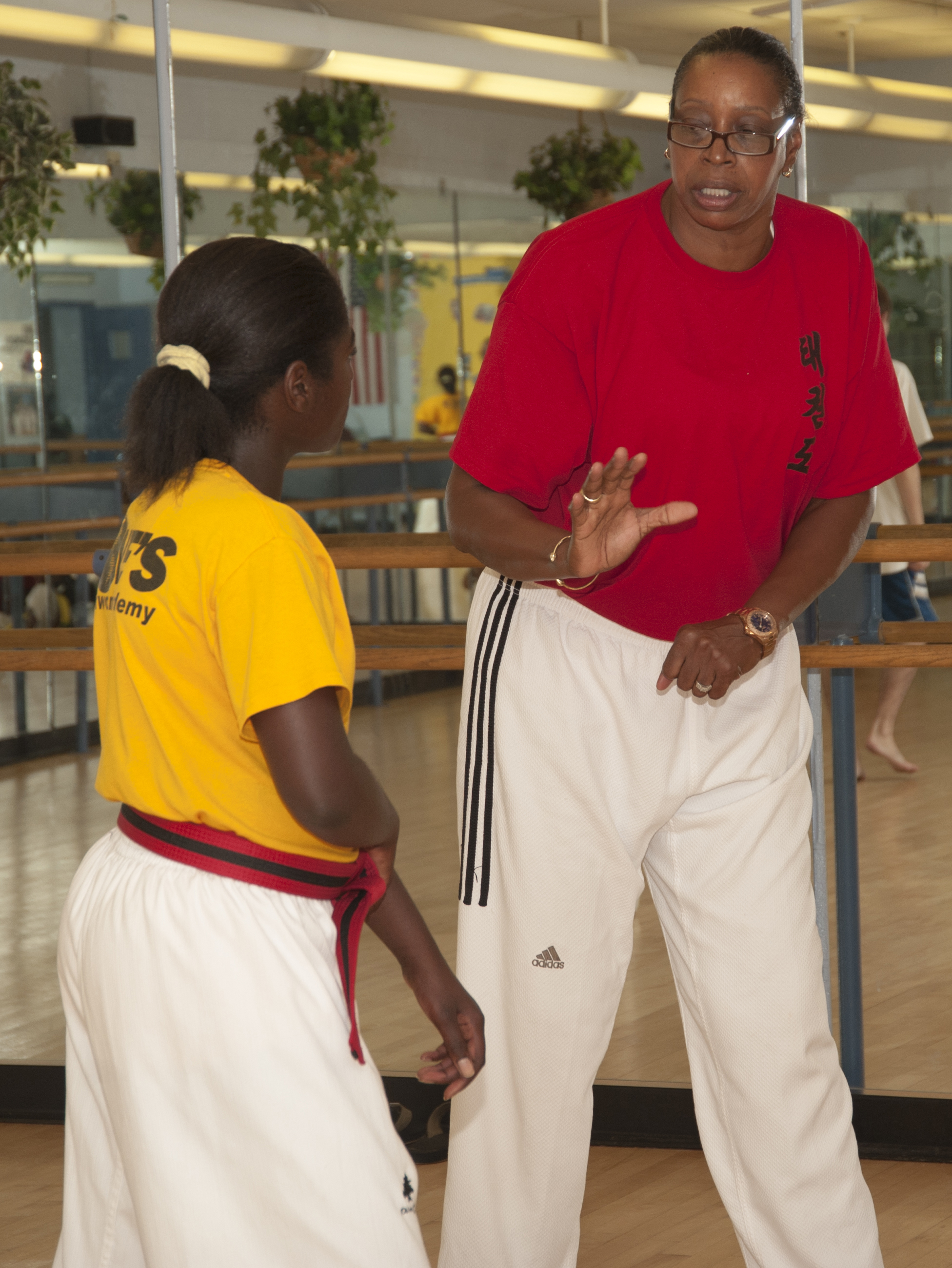
- Master Lynnette Love (right) gives a student one-on-one instruction at Andrews Air Force Base in 2012.

Personal information
- Full name: Lynnette Alicia Love
- Born: September 21, 1957 (age 68) Cook County, Illinois
Medal record
Women's taekwondo
Representing the United States
World Championships
Gold medal – first place	1987 Barcelona	Heavyweight (+70 kg)
Gold medal – first place	1991 Athens	Heavyweight (+70 kg)
Olympic Games (demonstration)
Gold medal – first place	1988 Seoul	Heavyweight (+70 kg)
Bronze medal – third place	1992 Barcelona	Heavyweight (+70 kg)

Lynnette Love (born September 21, 1957) is a United States Olympian in taekwondo. She achieved a gold medal in the 1988 Seoul Olympics and a bronze medal in the 1992 Barcelona Olympics. She trained was trained by Dong Ja Yang Howard University. Nominated for the Sullivan Award in 1988 In the World Guinness Book of Records in 1993 for only American to win 9 national titles and 2 world titles.

Lynnette acted in the WMAC Masters series, as "Tarantula", participating in only one episode, where she loses the fight for Dragon Star against Lady Lightning.
