= 1993 World Taekwondo Championships =

Taekwondo competition

- Venue: Madison Square Garden
- Location: New York City, United States
- Dates: 19–23 August 1993

Champions
- Men: South Korea
- Women: South Korea

The 1993 World Taekwondo Championships were the 11th edition of the World Taekwondo Championships, and were held in New York City, United States from August 19 to August 21, 1993, with 669 athletes participating from 83 countries.

The success of the 1993 World Championships was a determining factor in the IOC's decision to grant full medal status to Taekwondo for the 2000 Summer Olympics.

== Medal summary ==
=== Men ===
Event	Gold	Silver	Bronze
Finweight (−50 kg)	Jin Seung-tae; South Korea	Gergely Salim; Denmark	Carlos Ayala; Mexico
Finweight (−50 kg)	Jin Seung-tae; South Korea	Gergely Salim; Denmark	Eamon Nolan; Canada
Flyweight (−54 kg)	Javier Argudo; Spain	Alisson Yamagudi; Brazil	Rubén Palafox; Mexico
Flyweight (−54 kg)	Javier Argudo; Spain	Alisson Yamagudi; Brazil	Hyon Lee; United States
Bantamweight (−58 kg)	Kim In-young; South Korea	Sayed Najem; Canada	Walter Dean Vargas; Philippines
Bantamweight (−58 kg)	Kim In-young; South Korea	Sayed Najem; Canada	Wong Ching Beng; Malaysia
Featherweight (−64 kg)	Kim Byong-cheol; South Korea	Milton Iwama; Brazil	David Kang; United States
Featherweight (−64 kg)	Kim Byong-cheol; South Korea	Milton Iwama; Brazil	Francisco Zas; Spain
Lightweight (−70 kg)	Park Se-jin; South Korea	Victor Luke; Canada	Mustafa Dağdelen; Turkey
Lightweight (−70 kg)	Park Se-jin; South Korea	Victor Luke; Canada	Aziz Acharki; Germany
Welterweight (−76 kg)	Lim Yong-ho; South Korea	Liu Tsu-ien; Chinese Taipei	Ahmed Zahran; Egypt
Welterweight (−76 kg)	Lim Yong-ho; South Korea	Liu Tsu-ien; Chinese Taipei	Andreas Pilavakis; Cyprus
Middleweight (−83 kg)	Mickaël Meloul; France	Víctor Estrada; Mexico	Juan Wright; Spain
Middleweight (−83 kg)	Mickaël Meloul; France	Víctor Estrada; Mexico	Luis Noguera; Venezuela
Heavyweight (+83 kg)	Kim Je-kyoung; South Korea	Ali Şahin; Turkey	Emmanuel Oghenejobo; Nigeria
Heavyweight (+83 kg)	Kim Je-kyoung; South Korea	Ali Şahin; Turkey	Thierry Troudart; France

=== Women ===
Event	Gold	Silver	Bronze
Finweight (−43 kg)	Isabel Cruzado; Spain	Rahmi Kurnia; Indonesia	Vicki Slane; United States
Finweight (−43 kg)	Isabel Cruzado; Spain	Rahmi Kurnia; Indonesia	Gonca Güler; Turkey
Flyweight (−47 kg)	You Su-mi; South Korea	Águeda Pérez; Mexico	Inas Anis; Egypt
Flyweight (−47 kg)	You Su-mi; South Korea	Águeda Pérez; Mexico	Gülnur Yerlisu; Turkey
Bantamweight (−51 kg)	Tang Hui-wen; Chinese Taipei	Elisabet Delgado; Spain	Diane Murray; United States
Bantamweight (−51 kg)	Tang Hui-wen; Chinese Taipei	Elisabet Delgado; Spain	Won Sun-jin; South Korea
Featherweight (−55 kg)	Lee Seung-min; South Korea	Nuray Deliktaş; Turkey	Cathrin Vetter; Germany
Featherweight (−55 kg)	Lee Seung-min; South Korea	Nuray Deliktaş; Turkey	Sarah Maitimu; Netherlands
Lightweight (−60 kg)	María Jesús Santolaria; Spain	Park Kyung-suk; South Korea	Ineabelle Díaz; Puerto Rico
Lightweight (−60 kg)	María Jesús Santolaria; Spain	Park Kyung-suk; South Korea	Marina Agüero; Argentina
Welterweight (−65 kg)	Kim Mi-young; South Korea	Morfou Drosidou; Greece	Tsai Pei-shan; Chinese Taipei
Welterweight (−65 kg)	Kim Mi-young; South Korea	Morfou Drosidou; Greece	Carolina Benjarano; Colombia
Middleweight (−70 kg)	Park Eun-sun; South Korea	Ekaterina Bassi; Greece	Veera Liukkonen; Finland
Middleweight (−70 kg)	Park Eun-sun; South Korea	Ekaterina Bassi; Greece	Hsu Ju-ya; Chinese Taipei
Heavyweight (+70 kg)	Jung Myoung-sook; South Korea	Adriana Carmona; Venezuela	Elisavet Mystakidou; Greece
Heavyweight (+70 kg)	Jung Myoung-sook; South Korea	Adriana Carmona; Venezuela	Anna Widehov; Sweden

== Medal table ==
Rank	Nation	Gold	Silver	Bronze	Total
1	South Korea	11	1	1	13
2	Spain	3	1	2	6
3	Chinese Taipei	1	1	2	4
4	France	1	0	1	2
5	Turkey	0	2	3	5
6	Mexico	0	2	2	4
7	Canada	0	2	1	3
7	Greece	0	2	1	3
9	Brazil	0	2	0	2
10	Venezuela	0	1	1	2
11	Denmark	0	1	0	1
11	Indonesia	0	1	0	1
13	United States	0	0	4	4
14	Egypt	0	0	2	2
14	Germany	0	0	2	2
16	Argentina	0	0	1	1
16	Colombia	0	0	1	1
16	Cyprus	0	0	1	1
16	Finland	0	0	1	1
16	Malaysia	0	0	1	1
16	Netherlands	0	0	1	1
16	Nigeria	0	0	1	1
16	Philippines	0	0	1	1
16	Puerto Rico	0	0	1	1
16	Sweden	0	0	1	1
Totals (25 entries)		16	16	32	64
