= Jung Myoung-sook =

South Korean taekwondo practitioner

Personal information
- Nationality: South Korean
- Born: 4 May 1975 (age 51)

Sport
- Sport: Taekwondo
Medal record
Representing South Korea
Women's taekwondo
World Championships
Gold medal – first place	1993 New York City	Heavyweight
Gold medal – first place	1995 Manila	Heavyweight
Gold medal – first place	1997 Hong Kong	Heavyweight
Asian Championships
Gold medal – first place	1998 Ho Chi Minh City	+72 kg
Silver medal – second place	1992 Kuala Lumpur	+72 kg
Asian Games
Gold medal – first place	1998 Bangkok	+70 kg

Jung Myoung-sook (born 4 May 1975) is a South Korean taekwondo practitioner.

She won a gold medal in heavyweight at the 1993 World Taekwondo Championships, and again gold medals at the 1995 and 1997 World Taekwondo Championships. She won a gold medal at the 1998 Asian Taekwondo Championships in Ho Chi Minh City and a gold medal at the 1998 Asian Taekwondo Championships in Bangkok.
