= Hsu Chih-ling =

Taiwanese taekwondo practitioner

Personal information
- Nationality: Taiwanese
- Born: 1 September 1975 (age 50)

Sport
- Sport: Taekwondo
Medal record
Representing Chinese Taipei
Women's taekwondo
Asian Games
Gold medal – first place	1998 Bangkok	Lightweight

Hsu Chih-ling (born 1 September 1975) is a Taiwanese taekwondo practitioner.

She competed at the 2000 Summer Olympics in Sydney. She won a gold medal in lightweight at the 1998 Asian Games in Bangkok.
