= Elisabet Delgado =

Spanish taekwondo practitioner

Personal information
- Nationality: Spanish
- Born: 10 June 1975 (age 51)

Sport
- Sport: Taekwondo
Medal record
Representing Spain
Women's taekwondo
World Championships
Gold medal – first place	1991 Athens	Finweight
Silver medal – second place	1993 New York City	Bantamweight
Bronze medal – third place	1997 Hong Kong	Bantamweight

Elisabet Delgado (born 10 June 1975) is a Spanish taekwondo practitioner.

She won a gold medal in finweight at the 1991 World Taekwondo Championships in Athens. She won a silver medal in bantamweight at the 1993 World Taekwondo Championships in New York City, and a bronze medal at the 1997 World Taekwondo Championships in Hong Kong.
