= Chen Zhong =

Chinese Taekwondo practitioner (born 1982)

- Born: 22 November 1982 (age 43); Jiaozuo, Henan, People's Republic of China
- Nationality: Chinese
- Style: Taekwondo
- Teachers: Chen Liren, Zhang Jinghui
- Rank: 3rd dan (WTF)

Medal record

Women's taekwondo

Representing China

Olympic Games
Gold medal – first place	2004 Athens	+67 kg
Gold medal – first place	2000 Sydney	+67 kg

World Championships
Gold medal – first place	2007 Beijing	+72 kg
Bronze medal – third place	2003 Garmisch-Partenkirchen	+72 kg
Silver medal – second place	2001 Jeju City	72 kg
Bronze medal – third place	1999 Edmonton	72 kg

World Cup
Gold medal – first place	2002 Tokyo	72 kg
Gold medal – first place	2001 Ho Chi Minh City	72 kg

Asian Games
Gold medal – first place	2006 Doha	+72 kg
Silver medal – second place	2002 Busan	72 kg
Bronze medal – third place	1998 Bangkok	67 kg

Chen Zhong (simplified Chinese: 陈中; traditional Chinese: 陳中; pinyin: Chén Zhōng; born November 22, 1982) is a retired Chinese taekwondo competitor who represented her country at international level for more than 10 years, including three consecutive Summer Olympic Games. She won China's first Olympic gold medal in taekwondo at the 2000 Summer Olympics in Sydney, and successfully defended her title at the 2004 Summer Olympics in Athens. She competed at the 2008 Summer Olympics in Beijing, but did not make it past the quarter-final round.

== Early life ==
Chen was born on 22 November 1982 in Jiaozuo, Henan, People's Republic of China. She played basketball at the Jiaozuo Amateur Sport School for four years before changing to taekwondo in 1995. At first, she found the training difficult (she was required to execute more than 1,000 kicks each day) and would call her mother regularly. Chen doubted that she could continue but her mother told her to persevere, saying that if others could endure the programme, so could she. Chen was selected for the Chinese national taekwondo team in 1997.

== Competitive taekwondo career ==
In the first two years of her international competitive career, Chen was Chinese national champion in her division, and took bronze at the 1997 East Asian Games in Busan and silver at the 1998 Asian Championships in Ho Chi Minh City. She won a bronze medal in taekwondo at the 1998 Asian Games in Bangkok. Aged 16 at the time, she refused to leave the competition mat for over an hour after losing the semi-final match. In 1999, she came third in her division at the World Championships in Edmonton.

In 2000, Chen graduated from the Beijing Sports School, and went on to study at Beijing Sport University. Leading up to the Olympic Games that year, she won gold at the 2000 Asian Championships in Hong Kong. Chen won the gold medal in the women's +67 kg (heavyweight) competition at the 2000 Summer Olympics in Sydney, defeating Natalia Ivanova from Russia. This was China's first Olympic gold medal in taekwondo.

Chen continued performing at the highest levels of competition, taking first place at the 2001 World Cup in Ho Chi Minh City, second place at the 2001 World Championships in Jeju City, first place at the 2002 World Cup in Tokyo, and second place at the 2002 Asian Games in Busan, all in the 72 kg division. In 2003, she came third at the World Championships in Garmisch-Partenkirchen. In 2004, Chen successfully defended her Olympic title at the 2004 Summer Olympics in Athens, defeating Myriam Baverel of France. Chen Liren was coaching her at this time.

In 2005, due to sport-related injuries, Chen underwent surgery on her right knee. The following year, she won gold in her division at the 2006 Asian Games in Doha. The year after that, she took first place at the World Championships in Beijing. Leading up to the Summer Olympics in Beijing, Chen won her division at the 2008 Asian Championships in Luoyang. By this time, Zhang Jinghui (a former teammate) was coaching her. Given her dominant performance, Chen entered the Beijing Olympic campaign as a clear favourite to win a third consecutive Olympic gold medal.

At the quarter-finals of the women's heavyweight taekwondo competition at the 2008 Summer Olympics, Chen fought Sarah Stevenson from Great Britain and was declared the winner, but British officials protested. They claimed that the referees missed a scoring kick by Stevenson; subsequent examination of video footage showed this to be true. Chen's victory was rescinded, and Stevenson advanced. This was the first time in Olympic taekwondo history that a result was changed. In the semi-final round, the British athlete lost to María del Rosario Espinoza (the eventual gold medallist), meaning that any opportunity for Chen to win a medal through repechage was gone.^{[a]}

During most of her competitive career, Chen was listed at 180 cm (5 ft 11 in) in height and 72 kg (159 lb) in weight. One of her training methods was to practise kicking a volleyball that had been thrown into the air. Around 2003, she held the rank of 3rd dan in taekwondo.

== Post-competition career ==
In the period leading up to the 2008 Summer Olympics, Chen had indicated that she would retire for taekwondo competition after the Olympic tournament. She said, "I'm a single girl who has wandered around for 10 years. My parents want me to settle down." She has described herself as introverted, and paints as a hobby.

== See also ==
- China at the 2000 Summer Olympics
- China at the 2004 Summer Olympics
- China at the 2008 Summer Olympics
- Taekwondo at the Summer Olympics
- Zhuang Xiaoyan

== Notes ==
a. Sarah Stevenson eventually won the bronze medal in the women's heavyweight taekwondo competition at the 2008 Summer Olympics; this was Great Britain's first Olympic taekwondo medal.
