= Chavela Aaron =

American taekwondo and karate practitioner

Chavela Aaron is a former international competitor in taekwondo and karate from Boston, Massachusetts. She was a top ranked point fighter in karate winning the Diamond Nationals in 1988 and 1989. In 1991 she took 1st at the US National Taekwondo Team Trials, earned silver in the 1991 World Taekwondo Championships in the middleweight division, took 3rd at the US Olympic Festival in the middleweight division, and 3rd at the National Taekwondo Championships. In 1992 she took 1st at the National Taekwondo Championships in the welterweight division, defeating Danielle Laney in the finals, and took 4th at the US Olympic & PanAm Team Trials in the welterweight division, In 1994 she took 1st at the US National Taekwondo Championship. and the US Olympic Festival.
