= Hsien Feng-lien =

Taiwanese taekwondo practitioner

Personal information
- Nationality: Taiwanese

Sport
- Sport: Taekwondo
Medal record
Representing Chinese Taipei
Women's taekwondo
World Championships
Silver medal – second place	1987 Barcelona	Lightweight
Asian Championships
Silver medal – second place	1992 Kuala Lumpur	-60 kg
Bronze medal – third place	1990 Taipei	-65 kg

Hsien Feng-lien is a Taiwanese taekwondo practitioner. She won a silver medal in lightweight at the 1987 World Taekwondo Championships. She won a bronze medal at the 1990, and a silver medal at the 1992 Asian Taekwondo Championships.
