= Jung Jae-eun (taekwondo) =

South Korean taekwondo practitioner (born 1980)

Personal information
- Nationality: South Korean
- Born: 11 January 1980 (age 46)

Sport
- Sport: Taekwondo
Medal record
Representing South Korea
Women's taekwondo
Olympic Games
Gold medal – first place	2000 Sydney	57 kg
World Championships
Gold medal – first place	1997 Hong Kong	Featherweight
Gold medal – first place	2001 Jeju City	Bantamweight
Silver medal – second place	1999 Edmonton	Bantamweight

Jung Jae-Eun (born 11 January 1980) is a South Korean taekwondo practitioner and Olympic champion. She competed at the 2000 Summer Olympics in Sydney, where she won the gold medal in the 57 kg competition.
