= Lee Seung-min =

South Korean martial artist

- Style: Taekwondo

Other information
- Occupation: Taekwondo coach

Lee Seung-min
Medal record

Representing South Korea

Women's taekwondo

World Championships
Gold medal – first place	1995 Manila	Featherweight
Gold medal – first place	1993 New York	Featherweight

Asian Championships
Gold medal – first place	1996 Melbourne	Featherweight
Gold medal – first place	1990 Taipei	Bantamweight

Lee Seung-min (Korean: 이승민) is a South Korean taekwondo coach and former world champion in women's taekwondo representing South Korea.

Lee won gold in the bantamweight division at the 1990 Asian Taekwondo Championships in Taipei. In October 1992, she won the bantamweight division at the World University Taekwondo Championships in Guadalajara. She won gold in the featherweight division at the World Taekwondo Championships in 1993 in New York City and 1995 in Manila. She won gold in the featherweight division at the 1996 Asian Taekwondo Championships in Melbourne.

Lee was a member of the South Korean national taekwondo team for eight years. In 2006, she taught taekwondo in Maryland.

== See also ==
- World Taekwondo Federation
