= Yoriko Okamoto =

Japanese taekwondo practitioner

Medal record

Women's taekwondo

Representing Japan

Olympic Games
| Bronze medal – third place | 2000 Sydney | 67 kg |

Asian Games
| Bronze medal – third place | 1998 Bangkok | Lightweight |

Asian Championships
| Silver medal – second place | 1994 Manila | Welterweight |
| Silver medal – second place | 1996 Melbourne | Welterweight |
| Bronze medal – third place | 1998 Ho Chi Minh City | Welterweight |
| Bronze medal – third place | 2006 Bangkok | Welterweight |

Yoriko Okamoto (岡本 依子, Okamoto Yoriko; born September 6, 1971 in Kadoma, Osaka) is the first Japanese athlete to become an Olympic taekwondo medalist, winning the bronze medal at the Sydney 2000 Summer Olympics in the 57–67 kg weight class.

After beginning karate at age 12, she attended Waseda University in Tokyo. She spent her junior year of college studying abroad in the United States at the University of Oregon, where she began learning Taekwondo.

== Kickboxing record ==
Kickboxing record
0 wins, 1 losses, 0 draws
| Date | Result | Opponent | Event | Location | Method | Round | Time | Record |
| 1993-12-19 | Loss | (Netherlands) Lucia Rijker | K-2 Grand Prix '93 | Tokyo, Japan | TKO (right low kick) | 2 | 0:38 | |
Legend: Win Loss Draw/No contest Notes

== Personal life ==
Okamoto is a 1996 graduate of the Waseda School of Human Sciences, and currently works at Runes Kanazawa Co. Ltd. She is a Christian.
