= Cho Hyang-mi =

South Korean taekwondoin (born 1973)

Personal information
- Nationality: South Korean
- Born: 15 April 1973 (age 53)

Sport
- Sport: Taekwondo
Medal record
Representing South Korea
Women's taekwondo
World Championships
Gold medal – first place	1995 Manila	Welterweight
Gold medal – first place	1997 Hong Kong	Welterweight
Gold medal – first place	1999 Edmonton	Lightweight
Bronze medal – third place	1991 Athens	Welterweight
Asian Games
Gold medal – first place	1998 Bangkok	Welterweight

Cho Hyang-mi (born 15 April 1973) is a South Korean taekwondo practitioner.

She won a gold medal in welterweight at the 1995 World Taekwondo Championships, and another gold medal at the 1997 World Taekwondo Championships. She won a gold medal at the 1998 Asian Games, and a gold medal in lightweight at the 1999 World Taekwondo Championships in Edmonton.
