= Lee Sun-hee (taekwondo) =

South Korean taekwondo practitioner

Medal record

Women's taekwondo

Representing South Korea

Olympic Games
Gold medal – first place	2000 Sydney	67 kg

World Championships
Gold medal – first place	2003 Garmisch	Welterweight

Lee Sun-hee (born October 21, 1978) is a female South Korean taekwondo practitioner and Olympic champion. She competed at the 2000 Summer Olympics in Sydney, where she won the gold medal in the 67 kg competition. She won 6–3 in the final against Trude Gundersen of Norway.
