= 2009 World Taekwondo Championships – Men's middleweight =

Taekwondo competition

Men's middleweight at the 2009 World Championships
- Venue: Ballerup Super Arena
- Dates: 17 October 2009
- Competitors: 60 from 60 nations

Medalists
gold medal	Bahri Tanrıkulu	Turkey
silver medal	Carlo Molfetta	Italy
bronze medal	Vanja Babić	Serbia
bronze medal	Yousef Karami	Iran

The Men's Middleweight competition was the lightest class featured at the 2009 World Taekwondo Championships, and was held at the Ballerup Super Arena in Copenhagen, Denmark on October 17. Middleweights were limited to a maximum of 87 kilograms in body mass.

== Results ==
Legend

- DQ — Won by disqualification
- KO — Won by knockout

=== Finals ===
Semifinals		Final
Carlo Molfetta (ITA)	5
Vanja Babić (SRB)	4	Carlo Molfetta (ITA)	2
Bahri Tanrıkulu (TUR)	5	Bahri Tanrıkulu (TUR)	2
Yousef Karami (IRI)	2

=== Top half ===
==== Section 1 ====
Round of 64
Cristian Salcedo (COL)	7
Kyrikos Stratouras (CYP)	1
Mark Hansen (DEN)	6
Jung Young-han (KOR)	5
Badamgul Multazim (AFG)
Craig Brown (GBR)	KO
Carlo Molfetta (ITA)	8
Aram Sahakyan (ARM)	1
Zheng Yi (CHN)	5
Daniel Contreras (CUB)	0
Jurmen Amiena (SUR)	3
Jad Moussalli (LIB)	4
Adrian Spellen (GUY)	2
Ismail Musaev (RUS)	8

Round of 32
Augustin Bata (FRA)	6
Cristian Salcedo (COL)	0
Mark Hansen (DEN)	6
Craig Brown (GBR)	7
Carlo Molfetta (ITA)	3
Zheng Yi (CHN)	0
Jad Moussalli (LIB)	0
Ismail Musaev (RUS)	5

Round of 16
Augustin Bata (FRA)	2
Craig Brown (GBR)	4
Carlo Molfetta (ITA)	7
Ismail Musaev (RUS)	5

Quarterfinals
Craig Brown (GBR)	2
Carlo Molfetta (ITA)	4

==== Section 2 ====
Round of 64
Jon García (ESP)	7
Dafydd Sanders (NZL)	2
Tudor Sanon (HAI)	4
Mohamed El-Kharzazi (MAR)	11
Mufid Isaković (BIH)	7
Temitope Ayodele (NGR)	6
Alen Begić (SLO)	2
Ihar Rasakhatski (BLR)	7
Marvin Sellas (PUR)	0
Athanasios Nikolaidis (GRE)	1
Carlos Liebig (CHI)	DQ
~~Nguyễn Trọng Cường (VIE)~~
Vanja Babić (SRB)	5
Yuan Ming-che (TPE)	3

Round of 32
Jon García (ESP)	3
Mohamed El-Kharzazi (MAR)	6
Mufid Isaković (BIH)	3
Ihar Rasakhatski (BLR)	0
Athanasios Nikolaidis (GRE)	2
Carlos Liebig (CHI)	3
Vanja Babić (SRB)	2
François Coulombe-Fortier (CAN)	1

Round of 16
Mohamed El-Kharzazi (MAR)	7
Mufid Isaković (BIH)	6
Carlos Liebig (CHI)	1
Vanja Babić (SRB)	2

Quarterfinals
Mohamed El-Kharzazi (MAR)	2
Vanja Babić (SRB)	5

=== Bottom half ===
==== Section 3 ====
Round of 64
~~Md Mizanur Rahman (BAN)~~
Igor Li (UZB)	DQ
Mohammed Al-Sudani (IRQ)	2
Jakub Šťastný (CZE)	5
~~Noureddin Ebu El-Arough (LBA)~~
Robert Vossen (GER)	DQ
Youssouf Gnakoua (CIV)	3
Peter Vassily (AUS)	1
Volodymyr Krasitskyy (UKR)	3
Balázs Tóth (HUN)	5
~~Bader Al-Enezi (KUW)~~	DQ
~~Nicloas Balment (VAN)~~	DQ
Davranbek Rizayev (KAZ)	1
Tavakkul Bayramov (AZE)	2

Round of 32
Bahri Tanrıkulu (TUR)	7
Igor Li (UZB)	0
Jakub Šťastný (CZE)	0
Robert Vossen (GER)	2
Youssouf Gnakoua (CIV)	0
Balázs Tóth (HUN)	5
Bye
Tavakkul Bayramov (AZE)

Round of 16
Bahri Tanrıkulu (TUR)	3
Robert Vossen (GER)	1
Balázs Tóth (HUN)	3
Tavakkul Bayramov (AZE)	0

Quarterfinals
Bahri Tanrıkulu (TUR)	5
Balázs Tóth (HUN)	0

==== Section 4 ====
Round of 64
Fatao Alhassan (GHA)	0
Fattah Boukhars (ALG)	1
Douglas Marcelino (BRA)	DQ
~~Gayan Kumara (SRI)~~
~~Ibrahim Khan (IND)~~
José Chacoa (VEN)	DQ
Darko Harapin (CRO)	0
Mohammad Ayman (JOR)	9
Michael Oogink (NED)	4
Antony Graf (USA)	5
~~Rémy Alazoula (CAF)~~
Samir Aknouche (SWE)	DQ
Arturo Farías (MEX)	7
Juan Mora (DOM)	5

Round of 32
Fattah Boukhars (ALG)	7
Douglas Marcelino (BRA)	13
José Chacoa (VEN)	4
Mohammad Ayman (JOR)	2
Antony Graf (USA)	9
Samir Aknouche (SWE)	4
Arturo Farías (MEX)	1
Yousef Karami (IRI)	11

Round of 16
Douglas Marcelino (BRA)	6
José Chacoa (VEN)	2
Antony Graf (USA)	3
Yousef Karami (IRI)	4

Quarterfinals
Douglas Marcelino (BRA)	6
Yousef Karami (IRI)	12
