= 2006 European Taekwondo Championships =

2006 European Taekwondo championship in Germany

- Location: Bonn, Germany
- Dates: 26–28 May

Champion
- Spain

The 2006 European Taekwondo Championships were held in Bonn, Germany. The event held from 26 to 28 May 2006. The title matches were organized by the European Taekwondo Union (ETU). A total of 16 competitions were held, eight each for women and men in different weight classes.

== Medal table ==
* Host nation (Germany)

| Rank | Nation | Gold | Silver | Bronze | Total |
|---|---|---|---|---|---|
| 1 | Spain | 3 | 0 | 4 | 7 |
| 2 | Netherlands | 2 | 1 | 2 | 5 |
| 3 | Germany* | 2 | 1 | 1 | 4 |
| 4 | Italy | 2 | 0 | 3 | 5 |
| 5 | Azerbaijan | 1 | 3 | 1 | 5 |
| 5 | Turkey | 1 | 3 | 1 | 5 |
| 7 | Russia | 1 | 2 | 4 | 7 |
| 8 | France | 1 | 1 | 1 | 3 |
| 9 | Great Britain | 1 | 0 | 2 | 3 |
| 10 | Ukraine | 1 | 0 | 1 | 2 |
| 11 | Belgium | 1 | 0 | 0 | 1 |
| 12 | Sweden | 0 | 2 | 2 | 4 |
| 13 | Denmark | 0 | 1 | 0 | 1 |
| 13 | Israel | 0 | 1 | 0 | 1 |
| 13 | Switzerland | 0 | 1 | 0 | 1 |
| 16 | Greece | 0 | 0 | 3 | 3 |
| 17 | Croatia | 0 | 0 | 2 | 2 |
| 18 | Cyprus | 0 | 0 | 1 | 1 |
| 18 | Norway | 0 | 0 | 1 | 1 |
| 18 | Poland | 0 | 0 | 1 | 1 |
| 18 | Romania | 0 | 0 | 1 | 1 |
| 18 | Slovenia | 0 | 0 | 1 | 1 |
| Totals (22 entries) | | 16 | 16 | 32 | 64 |

== Medal summary ==
=== Men ===
| Event | Gold | Silver | Bronze |
|---|---|---|---|
| −54 kg | (Russia) Seyfula Magomedov | (Azerbaijan) Zahid Mammadov | (Greece) Ilías Michailidis (Romania) Marius Niţă |
| −58 kg | (Germany) Levent Tuncat | (Russia) Alan Nogajev | (France) Malik Mokdad (Italy) Diego Redina |
| −63 kg | (Azerbaijan) Ilkin Shahbazov | (Denmark) Cuneyt Hamid | (Cyprus) Rikkos Pattichis (Turkey) Kıvanç Dinçsalman |
| −68 kg | (Netherlands) Dennis Bekkers | (Israel) Tom Hovav | (Spain) Omar Badía (Russia) Aslanbek Dsitijew |
| −74 kg | (Italy) Claudio Nolano | (Turkey) Serdar Akın | (United Kingdom) Davoud Etmanani (Netherlands) Tommy Mollet |
| −80 kg | (Netherlands) Thijs Oude Luttikhuis | (Azerbaijan) Rashad Ahmadov | (Germany) Bashir Adam (United Kingdom) Craig Brown |
| −84 kg | (Spain) Jon García | (Turkey) Bahri Tanrıkulu | (Azerbaijan) Tavakkul Bayramov (Slovenia) Tomaž Zakrajšek |
| +84 kg | (France) Mickaël Borot | (Netherlands) Ferry Greevink | (Italy) Leonardo Basile (Poland) Karol Franz |

=== Women ===
| Event | Gold | Silver | Bronze |
|---|---|---|---|
| −47 kg | (Spain) Belén Asensio | (Azerbaijan) Shahrun Yusifova | (Russia) Viktorija Fomenko (Greece) Ioanna Koutsou |
| −51 kg | (Ukraine) Hanna Soroka | (Sweden) Hanna Zajc | (Greece) Fotiní Birba (Russia) Nelli Shakarian |
| −55 kg | (Italy) Federica Mastrantoni | (Russia) Margarita Mkrtchyan | (Croatia) Nives Ambrus (Spain) Andrea Rica |
| −59 kg | (Germany) Pınar Budak | (Switzerland) Nina Kläy | (Italy) Veronica Calabrese (Croatia) Martina Zubčić |
| −63 kg | (Spain) Muriel Bujalance | (Germany) Helena Fromm | (Ukraine) Olha Tscherkun (Sweden) Lie Kylborn |
| −67 kg | (Turkey) Sibel Güler | (France) Gwladys Épangue | (Norway) Nina Solheim (Sweden) Carolin Persson |
| −72 kg | (United Kingdom) Sarah Stevenson | (Turkey) Tuğba Abuş | (Spain) Aitziber los Arcos (Netherlands) Annette van Deursen |
| +72 kg | (Belgium) Laurence Rase | (Sweden) Karolina Kedzierska | (Russia) Marija Konjachina (Spain) Rosana Simón |
