= Alesiya Charnyovskaya =

Belarusian taekwondo practitioner (born 1978)

Medal record

Representing Belarus

Women's taekwondo

World Championships
Bronze medal – third place	2001 Jeju	Middleweight

European Championships
Gold medal – first place	2004 Lillehammer	Middleweight
Silver medal – second place	2000 Patras	Middleweight
Bronze medal – third place	2005 Riga	Middleweight
Bronze medal – third place	2002 Samsun	Middleweight
Bronze medal – third place	1998 Eindhoven	Welterweight

Universiade
Silver medal – second place	2005 Izmir	Middleweight
Bronze medal – third place	2003 Daegu	Middleweight

Alesiya Charnyovskaya (born 23 January 1978) is a Belarusian taekwondo practitioner.
