= 2004 European Taekwondo Championships =

Taekwondo competition

- Location: Lillehammer, Norway
- Start date: 2 May
- End date: 5 May

The 2004 European Taekwondo Championships were held in Lillehammer, Norway. The event took place from 2 to 5 May, 2004.

== Medal summary ==
* Host nation (Norway)

Rank	Nation	Gold	Silver	Bronze	Total
1	Spain	5	4	0	9
2	Turkey	3	1	4	8
3	France	2	2	4	8
4	Croatia	2	1	1	4
5	Azerbaijan	1	1	2	4
6	Great Britain	1	1	1	3
7	Belarus	1	0	1	2
8	Austria	1	0	0	1
9	Netherlands	0	1	5	6
10	Russia	0	1	3	4
11	Germany	0	1	2	3
11	Greece	0	1	2	3
11	Italy	0	1	2	3
14	Ukraine	0	1	0	1
15	Sweden	0	0	2	2
16	Belgium	0	0	1	1
16	Norway*	0	0	1	1
16	Portugal	0	0	1	1
Totals (18 entries)		16	16	32	64

=== Men ===
Event	Gold	Silver	Bronze
–54 kg	Paul Green; United Kingdom	Seifula Magomedov; Russia	Kadir Dolaş; Turkey; Pedro Póvoa; Portugal
–58 kg	Juan Antonio Ramos; Spain	Elnur Amanov; Azerbaijan	Rakesh Debipersad; Netherlands; Ludovic Vo; France
–62 kg	Omar Badía; Spain	Maxim Boitsov; Ukraine	Aziz Bartal; France; Ümit Köse; Turkey
–67 kg	Niyamaddin Pashayev; Azerbaijan	Matija Šantić; Croatia	Erdal Aylanç; Germany; Raphaël Decius; France
–72 kg	Ertan Baştuğ; Turkey	Carlo Molfetta; Italy	Tommy Mollet; Netherlands; Joni Viitanen; Sweden
–78 kg	Rosendo Alonso; Spain	Christophe Négrel; France	Rashad Ahmadov; Azerbaijan; Thijs Oude Luttikhuis; Netherlands
–84 kg	Bruno Ntep; France	Patrick Stevens; Netherlands	Tavakkul Bayramov; Azerbaijan; Bahri Tanrıkulu; Turkey
+84 kg	Rubén Montesinos; Spain	Pascal Gentil; France	Ken Holter; Norway; Milorad Kuzmanović; Croatia

=== Women ===
Event	Gold	Silver	Bronze
–47 kg	Brigitte Yagüe; Spain	Adamadia Psallida; Greece	Sara Abdel Wahab; Italy; Kadriye Selimoğlu; Turkey
–51 kg	Nevena Lukić; Austria	Jennifer Delgado; Spain	Charlene Mongelard; United Kingdom; Hanna Zajc; Sweden
–55 kg	Zeynep Murat; Turkey	Sandra Nitschke; Germany	Margarita Mkrtchian; Russia; Carine Zelmanovitch; France
–59 kg	Gwladys Épangue; France	Hamide Bıkçın Tosun; Turkey	Cristiana Corsi; Italy; Liudmila Zheronkina; Belarus
–63 kg	Miet Filipović; Croatia	Muriel Bujalance; Spain	Esther Scholten; Germany; Joyce van Baaren; Netherlands
–67 kg	Sibel Güler; Turkey	Ibone Lallana; Spain	Yekaterina Arutiunian; Russia; Sararitula Pagonaki; Greece
–72 kg	Alesia Cherniavskaya; Belarus	Aitziber los Arcos; Spain	Yekaterina Nazarova; Russia; Laurence Rase; Belgium
+72 kg	Nataša Vezmar; Croatia	Sarah Stevenson; United Kingdom	Yvonne Oude Luttikhuis; Netherlands; Kyriakí Kúvari; Greece
