= 2002 European Taekwondo Championships =

Taekwondo competition

- Location: Samsun, Turkey
- Start date: 26 May
- End date: 29 May

The 2002 European Taekwondo Championships were held in Samsun, Turkey. The event took place from 26 to 29 May, 2002.

== Medal summary ==
* Host nation (Turkey)

Rank	Nation	Gold	Silver	Bronze	Total
1	Turkey*	6	2	3	11
2	Spain	2	3	3	8
3	Netherlands	2	1	3	6
4	France	2	1	1	4
5	Russia	1	1	4	6
6	Croatia	1	1	2	4
7	Italy	1	1	1	3
8	Greece	1	1	0	2
9	Azerbaijan	0	2	1	3
10	Belgium	0	1	0	1
10	Great Britain	0	1	0	1
10	Ukraine	0	1	0	1
13	Germany	0	0	5	5
14	Belarus	0	0	3	3
15	Norway	0	0	2	2
16	Austria	0	0	1	1
16	Cyprus	0	0	1	1
16	Finland	0	0	1	1
16	Sweden	0	0	1	1
Totals (19 entries)		16	16	32	64

=== Men ===
Event	Gold	Silver	Bronze
–54 kg	Mert Tuncer; Turkey	Juan Antonio Ramos; Spain	Seifula Magomedov; Russia; Muhammed Öztürk; Austria
–58 kg	Ludovic Vo; France	Alexandr Zhapozhnik; Ukraine	Elnur Amanov; Azerbaijan; Muhammed Ali Karataş; Germany
–62 kg	Omar Badía; Spain	Dennis Mollet; Netherlands	Erdal Aylanç; Germany; Endre Steffensen; Norway
–67 kg	Ioanis Yeoryos; Greece	Abdelkrim Hohoud; Belgium	Dennis Bekkers; Netherlands; Ruslan Magomedov; Russia
–72 kg	Ertan Baştuğ; Turkey	Rashad Ahmadov; Azerbaijan	Tommy Mollet; Netherlands; Claudio Nolano; Italy
–78 kg	Bekir Aydın; Turkey	Fagan Umudov; Azerbaijan	Tomislav Bučanac; Croatia; Mathias Gabriel; Germany
–84 kg	Bahri Tanrıkulu; Turkey	Mickaël Borot; France	Jon García Aguado; Spain; Patrick Stevens; Netherlands
+84 kg	Ferry Greevink; Netherlands	Ali Özen; Turkey	Teemu Heino; Finland; Ken Holter; Norway

=== Women ===
Event	Gold	Silver	Bronze
–47 kg	Brigitte Yagüe; Spain	Kadriye Selimoğlu; Turkey	Svetlana Cherasimovich; Belarus; Maria Tseriotu; Cyprus
–51 kg	Döndü Güvenç; Turkey	Lana Banelli; Croatia	Cathiana Grosset; France; Svetlana Noskova; Russia
–55 kg	Gwladys Épangue; France	Pamela Agostinelli; Italy	Sandra Nitschke; Germany; Ivana Vujčić; Croatia
–59 kg	Cristiana Corsi; Italy	Margarita Mkrtchian; Russia	Zeynep Murat; Turkey; Sonia Reyes; Spain
–63 kg	Ayşenur Taşbakan; Turkey	Muriel Bujalance; Spain	Yuliya Krasnopolskaya; Russia; Caroline Persson; Sweden
–67 kg	Ylona van Deutekom; Netherlands	Elisávet Mystakidu; Greece	Luisa Arnanz; Spain; Yvonne Timm; Germany
–72 kg	Natalia Ivanova; Russia	Sarah Stevenson; United Kingdom	Alesia Cherniavskaya; Belarus; Güler Gençtürkoğlu; Turkey
+72 kg	Nataša Vezmar; Croatia	Aitziber los Arcos; Spain	Arzu Er; Turkey; Mariya Zhuravskaya; Belarus
