= Hichem Hamdouni =

Tunisian taekwondo practitioner

Personal information
- Full name: Hichem Al-Hamdouni
- Nationality: Tunisia
- Born: 2 February 1981 (age 45) Tunis, Tunisia
- Height: 1.85 m (6 ft 1 in)
- Weight: 80 kg (176 lb)

Sport
- Sport: Taekwondo
- Event: 80 kg

Hichem Al-Hamdouni (also Hichem Hamdouni, Arabic: هشام الحمدوني; born 2 February 1981 in Tunis) is a retired Tunisian taekwondo practitioner. Hamdouni qualified for Tunisia in the men's welterweight category (80 kg) at the 2004 Summer Olympics in Athens by claiming the bronze medal and receiving a berth from the All-Africa Games in Abuja, Nigeria. Hamdouni outclassed Nigeria's Jacob Obiorah in the opening bout before losing out his next match to Turkey's Bahri Tanrıkulu in a tight decision 4–6. With his opponent advancing further into the final round, Hamdouni offered a second chance for an Olympic medal by aggressively defeating Philippines' Donald Geisler in the first repechage bout that left his opponent with a dislocated ankle and a double tendon injury. Following a straightforward triumph over an injured Filipino taekwondo jin, Hamdouni ended his Olympic campaign in the second repechage round with a default loss of 4–12 against Iran's Yousef Karami.
