= Christophe Negrel =

French taekwondo practitioner

Personal information
- Full name: Christophe Negrel
- Nationality: France
- Born: 25 May 1977 (age 49) Marseille, France
- Height: 1.80 m (5 ft 11 in)
- Weight: 78 kg (172 lb)

Sport
- Sport: Taekwondo
- Event: 80 kg
- Club: BCTR La Rose
- Coached by: Philippe Pinerd
Medal record
Men's taekwondo
Representing France
World Championships
Silver medal – second place	1997 Hong Kong	70 kg
European Championships
Gold medal – first place	2005 Riga	78 kg
Silver medal – second place	2004 Lillehammer	78 kg
Bronze medal – third place	2000 Patras	72 kg

Christophe Negrel (born 25 May 1977) is a French taekwondo practitioner who competed in the men's welterweight category. He picked up a total of eight medals in his career, including three from the European Championships and a silver in the 70-kg division from the 1997 World Taekwondo Championships in Hong Kong, and attained a top eight finish at the 2004 Summer Olympics, representing his nation France. Throughout his sporting career, Negrel trained full-time for La Rose Boxing and Taekwondo Club in his native Marseille, and also became a full-fledged member of the French taekwondo squad since 1996, under head coach and master Philippe Pinard.

Negrel started his sporting career by picking up a bronze medal at the 1994 European Junior Championships in Bucharest, Romania. Three years later, he made his official debut in the senior division and eventually claimed a silver in the 70-kg class at the 1997 World Taekwondo Championships in Hong Kong, losing the final to Egypt's Tamer Abdelmoneim Hussein. In 2003, Negrel reached the pinnacle of his sporting career, as he secured a gold medal victory over Iran's Yousef Karami and a spot on the French Olympic squad in the 80-kg class at the World Olympic Qualifying Tournament in Paris.

At the 2004 Summer Olympics in Athens, Negrel qualified for the French squad in the men's welterweight class (80 kg), by topping the field of fighters and granting a berth from the World Olympic Qualifying Tournament in Paris. As the top seeder of the prelim draw, Negrel opened his match with a powerful 13–10 victory over Dutch taekwondo jin Patrick Stevens before he fell in a stunning 17–24 defeat to Azerbaijan's Rashad Ahmadov in the quarterfinals.
