= Taekwondo at the 2004 Summer Olympics – Men's 80 kg =

Taekwondo competition

Men's 80 kg at the Games of the XXVIII Olympiad
- Venue: Faliro Coastal Zone Olympic Complex
- Date: 28 August
- Competitors: 16 from 16 nations

Medalists
1st place, gold medalist(s)		Steven López	United States
2nd place, silver medalist(s)		Bahri Tanrıkulu	Turkey
3rd place, bronze medalist(s)		Yousef Karami	Iran

The men's 80 kg competition in taekwondo at the 2004 Summer Olympics in Athens took place on August 28 at the Faliro Coastal Zone Olympic Complex.

Moving up to 12 kg heavier than his weight in Sydney four years earlier, American taekwondo jin Steven López defied his odds to defeat Turkey's Bahri Tanrıkulu with a score 3–0 for his second Olympic gold. Iran's Yousef Karami rallied for a tight 9–8 victory over Azerbaijan's Rashad Ahmadov to grab the bronze medal.

== Competition format ==
The main bracket consisted of a single elimination tournament, culminating in the gold medal match. The taekwondo fighters eliminated in earlier rounds by the two finalists of the main bracket advanced directly to the repechage tournament. These matches determined the bronze medal winner for the event.

== Schedule ==
All times are Greece Standard Time (UTC+2)

Date	Time	Round
Saturday, 28 August 2004	11:00; 16:00; 17:30; 20:30	Preliminary Round; Quarterfinals; Semifinals; Final

== Results ==
Legend

- PTG — Won by points gap
- KO — Won by knockout
- SUP — Won by superiority
- OT — Won on over time (Golden Point)
- WO — Walkover

=== Main bracket ===
Preliminary round
Christophe Negrel (FRA)	13
Patrick Stevens (NED)	10
Rashad Ahmadov (AZE)	10
Chinedum Osuji (TRI)	3
Bahri Tanrıkulu (TUR)	9+
Donald Geisler (PHI)	9
Hichem Hamdouni (TUN)	16
Jacob Obiorah (NGR)	11
Craig Brown (GBR)	6
Daniel Trenton (AUS)	12
Kriangkrai Noikoed (THA)	12
Yousef Karami (IRI)	16
Raid Rasheed (IRQ)	0
Steven López (USA)	12
Víctor Estrada (MEX)	8
Ángel Matos (CUB)	7

Second round
Christophe Negrel (FRA)	17
Rashad Ahmadov (AZE)	24
Bahri Tanrıkulu (TUR)	6
Hichem Hamdouni (TUN)	4
Daniel Trenton (AUS)	9
Yousef Karami (IRI)	13
Steven López (USA)	4
Víctor Estrada (MEX)	2

Semifinals
Rashad Ahmadov (AZE)	6
Bahri Tanrıkulu (TUR)	6+
Yousef Karami (IRI)	6
Steven López (USA)	7

Gold medal match
Bahri Tanrıkulu (TUR)	0
Steven López (USA)	3

=== Repechage ===
Quarterfinals
Víctor Estrada (MEX)	WO
Raid Rasheed (IRQ)
Hichem Hamdouni (TUN)	RSC
Donald Geisler (PHI)	1:41-2

Semifinals
Rashad Ahmadov (AZE)	9+
Víctor Estrada (MEX)	9
Yousef Karami (IRI)	12
Hichem Hamdouni (TUN)	4

Bronze medal match
Rashad Ahmadov (AZE)	8
Yousef Karami (IRI)	9
