= 2011 World Taekwondo Championships – Men's middleweight =

Taekwondo competition

Men's middleweight at the 2011 World Championships
- Venue: Gyeongju Indoor Stadium
- Dates: 5–6 May 2011
- Competitors: 58 from 58 nations

Medalists
| gold medal | Yousef Karami | Iran |
| silver medal | Cha Dong-min | South Korea |
| bronze medal | Jon García | Spain |
| bronze medal | Carlo Molfetta | Italy |

The Men's middleweight is a competition featured at the 2011 World Taekwondo Championships, and was held at the Gyeongju Gymnasium in Gyeongju, South Korea on May 5 and May 6. Middleweights were limited to a maximum of 87 kilograms in body mass.

== Results ==
Legend

- DQ — Won by disqualification
- K — Won by knockout
- P — Won by punitive declaration
- W — Won by withdrawal

=== Finals ===
| Semifinals | | Final |
| Yousef Karami (IRI) | 7^{P} |
| Jon García (ESP) | 1 | Yousef Karami (IRI) | 8 |
| Carlo Molfetta (ITA) | 4 | Cha Dong-min (KOR) | 6 |
| Cha Dong-min (KOR) | 5 |

=== Top half ===
==== Section 1 ====
Round of 64
~~Patroba Abade (KEN)~~
Kenneth Edwards (JAM) | DQ
Vitoldas Dzikevič (LTU) | DQ
~~Temitope Ayodele (NGR)~~
Tarek Gaber (EGY) | 5
Zheng Yi (CHN) | 8
Rémy Alazoula (CAF) | 0^{W}
Biribo Tara (KIR) | 0
Łukasz Śmigaj (POL) | 12
Hung Man Chun (HKG) | 0
Chen Hung-tzung (TPE) | 1
Tudor Sanon (HAI) | 7
Mufid Isaković (BIH) | 1
Ivan Nikitin (RUS) | 6

Round of 32
Yousef Karami (IRI) | 8
Kenneth Edwards (JAM) | 3
Vitoldas Dzikevičius (LTU) | 0
Zheng Yi (CHN) | 4
Rémy Alazoula (CAF) | 5^{W}
Łukasz Śmigaj (POL) | 2
Tudor Sanon (HAI) | 1
Ivan Nikitin (RUS) | 5

Round of 16
Yousef Karami (IRI) | 7
Zheng Yi (CHN) | 1
Rémy Alazoula (CAF) | 2
Ivan Nikitin (RUS) | 6

Quarterfinals
Yousef Karami (IRI) | 6
Ivan Nikitin (RUS) | 2

==== Section 2 ====
Round of 64
Manipal Singh (IND) | 4
Tomáš Kališka (SVK) | 7
~~Edmond Ayer (GHA)~~
Jeroen Wanrooij (NED) | DQ
~~Carlos Bautista (DOM)~~
Jad Moussalli (LIB) | DQ
Adrian Spellen (GUY) | 0
Arman Yeremyan (ARM) | 4
Rigoberto Sánchez (MEX) | 1
Alberto Celestrin (GER) | 1
Nikola Bojo (CRO) | 12
Đorđe Marčetić (SRB) | 9

Round of 32
Jon García (ESP) | 15
Tomáš Kališka (SVK) | 3
Jeroen Wanrooij (NED) | 7
Jad Moussalli (LIB) | 4
Arman Yeremyan (ARM) | 3
Alberto Celestrin (GER) | 7
Nikola Bojo (CRO) | 2
Bahri Tanrıkulu (TUR) | 11

Round of 16
Jon García (ESP) | 4
Jeroen Wanrooij (NED) | 1
Alberto Celestrin (GER) | 6
Bahri Tanrıkulu (TUR) | 5

Quarterfinals
Jon García (ESP) | 8
Alberto Celestrin (GER) | 3

=== Bottom half ===
==== Section 3 ====
Round of 64
Arsenio Nhandime (MOZ) | 0
Ihar Rasakhatski (BLR) | 8^{K}
Aydal Ozalp (AUS) | 6
Damon Sansum (GBR) | 7
Sagynysh Kalimbetov (KAZ) | DQ
~~Carlos Rivas (VEN)~~
Anthony Obame (GAB) | 12
Epati Lafaialii (SAM) | 0
Jakub Šťastný (CZE) | DQ
~~Carlos Cañas (COL)~~
Konstantinos Gkoltsios (GRE) | 14
Nua Rukaj (ALB) | 0

Round of 32
Carlo Molfetta (ITA) | 6
Ihar Rasakhatski (BLR) | 2
Damon Sansum (GBR) | 5^{P}
Sagynysh Kalimbetov (KAZ) | 3
Anthony Obame (GAB) | 4
Jakub Šťastný (CZE) | 1
Konstantinos Gkoltsios (GRE) | 6
Mohamed El-Kharzazi (MAR) | 5

Round of 16
Carlo Molfetta (ITA) | 16
Damon Sansum (GBR) | 8
Anthony Obame (GAB) | 5
Konstantinos Gkoltsios (GRE) | 7

Quarterfinals
Carlo Molfetta (ITA) | 10
Konstantinos Gkoltsios (GRE) | 7

==== Section 4 ====
Round of 64
Augustin Bata (FRA) | 3
Kyriakos Stratouras (CYP) | 2
Christoph Decker (AUT) | 6
Tavakkul Bayramov (AZE) | 7
Igor Moraes (BRA) | 1
Đinh Quang Đức (VIE) | 2
Dafydd Sanders (NZL) | 5
Carlos Liebig (CHI) | 6
Cha Dong-min (KOR) | 5
Jason Neville (USA) | 3
~~Fanfan Kikima (COD)~~
Jurmen Amiena (SUR) | DQ
Björn Thorleifsson (ISL) | 6
Volodymyr Krasitskyy (UKR) | 4

Round of 32
Augustin Bata (FRA) | 3
Tavakkul Bayramov (AZE) | 2
Đinh Quang Đức (VIE) | 3
Carlos Liebig (CHI) | 5
Cha Dong-min (KOR) | 15
Jurmen Amiena (SUR) | 1
Björn Thorleifsson (ISL) | 3
François Coulombe-Fortier (CAN) | 6

Round of 16
Augustin Bata (FRA) | 8
Carlos Liebig (CHI) | 6
Cha Dong-min (KOR) | 8
François Coulombe-Fortier (CAN) | 2

Quarterfinals
Augustin Bata (FRA) | 1
Cha Dong-min (KOR) | 5
