= Ertan Baştuğ =

Turkish taekwondo practitioner

Sport
- Country: Turkey
- Sport: Taekwondo
Medal record
Men's taekwondo
European Championships
| Gold medal – first place | 2002 Samsun | –72 kg |
| Gold medal – first place | 2004 Lillehammer | –72 kg |
| Silver medal – second place | 1998 Eindhoven | –72 kg |

Ertan Baştuğ is a Turkish taekwondo practitioner. He won two gold medals and a silver medal at the European Taekwondo Championships between 1998 and 2004.
