= Demet Özcan =

Turkish-German taekwondo athlete (born 2000)

Personal information
- Born: April 13, 1988 (age 38)

Sport
- Sport: Taekwondo
- Weight class: –55 kg

Demet Özcan (April 13, 1988) is a German athlete who practices taekwondo. She won a bronze medal at the 2005 European Taekwondo Championships in the –55 kg weight class.

== International wins ==
European Championships
Year	Host city	Medal	Class
2005	Riga (Latvia)	Bronze	–55 kg
