= Craig Brown (taekwondo) =

English taekwondo practitioner

Personal information
- Full name: Craig Brown
- Nationality: United Kingdom; Jamaica
- Born: 16 February 1983 (age 43) London, England, Great Britain
- Height: 1.82 m (5 ft 11 1/2 in)
- Weight: 82 kg (181 lb)
- Spouse: Kayla D. Luciano-Brown

Sport
- Sport: Taekwondo
- Event: 80 kg
- Club: Fusion Taekwondo Club, Impact Taekwondo
Medal record
Men's taekwondo
Representing the United Kingdom
European Championships
Bronze medal – third place	2005 Riga	78 kg
Bronze medal – third place	2006 Bonn	78 kg
Representing Jamaica
Central American and Caribbean Games
Silver medal – second place	2014 Veracruz	87 kg

Craig Brown (born February 16, 1983, in London, England) is an English taekwondo practitioner, who competed in the men's welterweight category. He became a member of Team GB's taekwondo squad on his major debut at the 2004 Summer Olympics, retrieved two bronze medals in the 78-kg division at the European Championships (2005 and 2006), and held a total of eight national championship titles throughout his entire career in the United Kingdom. Missing out on selection for two succeeding Olympic bids, Brown had decided to leave his British team to apply for his dual citizenship and represent Jamaica in 2013. Shortly after his immediate transfer, Brown trained full-time with Jamaican national coach Fabio Takahashi, and gave his new team a historic silver medal in taekwondo at the 2014 Central American and Caribbean Games in Veracruz, Mexico.

== Career history ==
=== Representing the United Kingdom ===
Brown was born and raised in Peckham, South East London to British Mother and Jamaican father. From an early age, Brown adored watching his heroes Bruce Lee and Muhammad Ali on television that inspired him and piqued his interest to with their martial arts discipline. At the age of eleven, he decided to take up taekwondo at an Oliver Goldsmith Primary School in Peckham.

Since then, Brown had retrieved a fourth dan black belt and collected eight British national championship titles in a combined junior and senior division. In 2003, Brown moved to Manchester, England, where he became a full-fledged member of Team GB's National Taekwondo Academy.

Brown qualified for the Team GB's taekwondo squad in the men's welterweight class (80 kg) at the 2004 Summer Olympics in Athens. Earlier in the process, he finished with a silver medal behind Turkey's Bahri Tanrıkulu at the European Olympic Qualifying Tournament in Baku, Azerbaijan to guarantee his place on the British Olympic team. With a lack of international experience, Brown fought more cautiously in his opening-round match against Australian fighter and 2000 Olympic silver medalist Daniel Trenton, resulting in an adverse 6–12 defeat. When Trenton immediately lost the quarterfinals to Iran's Yousef Karami, Brown shortened his chance to proceed into the repechage for Great Britain's first ever Olympic medal.

In 2005, Brown improved from his ill-fated Olympic feat to claim the bronze medal in the men's 78-kg division at the European Championships in Riga, Latvia, and then repeated the same result in Bonn, Germany, by the following year.

Brown missed the 2008 season with a stress fracture in his back, which deprived him of a chance to compete for his second Olympics in Beijing. When his native London hosted the 2012 Summer Olympics, he suffered again on another Olympic setback with a severe hamstring injury that ruled himself out of the Games in the process.

After his six-year membership from the National Taekwondo Academy, Brown had decided to return home to London in 2010 to pursue other commitments to the sport. On that same year, Brown established his own taekwondo school with the goal of using the sport to positively impact the lives of the people within his community in London.

=== Life and career in Jamaica ===
Having been a member of the nation's prominent taekwondo team for over a decade and narrowly missed out on a selection for Team GB in Beijing 2008 and London 2012, Brown had decided to acquire a dual citizenship and represent his paternal homeland Jamaica with a focus on making the team for the 2016 Olympic bid. Currently, he has been training full-time as a member of the Jamaican taekwondo team under head coach Fabio Takahashi.

At the 2014 Central American and Caribbean Games in Veracruz, Mexico, Brown picked up the silver medal for his Jamaican squad in the men's 87-kg category, losing the final to Cuba's Rafael Alba by a wide 2–18 margin.
