= Kadriye Selimoğlu =

Turkish taekwondo practitioner

Personal information
- Nationality: Turkish
- Born: June 1, 1978 (age 48) Rize, Turkey

Sport
- Country: Turkey
- Sport: Taekwondo
- Event: Finweight
- Club: Istanbul B.B. SK
Medal record
Women's Taekwondo
Representing Turkey
World Championships
Gold medal – first place	2001 Jeju City	Finweight
Bronze medal – third place	1999 Edmonton	Finweight
European Championships
Silver medal – second place	2008 Rome	-47 kg
Bronze medal – third place	2004 Lillehammer	-47 kg
Silver medal – second place	2002 Samsun	-47 kg
Bronze medal – third place	2000 Patra	-47 kg
Bronze medal – third place	1996 Helsinki	-47 kg

Kadriye Selimoğlu (born June 1, 1978 in Rize, Turkey) is a world champion Turkish Taekwondo practitioner competing in the finweight class. She is a member of the Istanbul B.B. SK.

She began Taekwondo already in her early age of 13 and became national champion in her age category. Selimoğlu studied in physical education and sports at the Gazi University in Ankara. She works as a teacher of physical education.

She is winner of the gold medal at the 2001 World Taekwondo Championships held in Jeju City, South Korea.

== Achievements ==
- (gold) 1996 European Youth Championships - Zagreb, Croatia -49 kg
- (bronze) 1996 European Championships - Helsinki, Finland -47 kg
- (bronze) 1999 World Championships - Edmonton, Canada -47 kg
- (bronze) 2000 European Championships - Patras, Greece -47 kg
- (gold) 2001 World Championships - Jeju City, South Korea -47 kg
- (silver) 2002 European Championships - Samsun, Turkey -47 kg
- (bronze) 2004 European Championships - Lillehammer, Norway -47 kg
- (gold) 2008 A-Class German Open - Hamburg, Germany -47 kg
- (silver) 2008 European Championships - Rome, Italy -47 kg
- (bronze) 2009 A-Class Spanish Open - Alicante, Spain -46 kg
- (silver) 2010 A-Class Dutch Open - Eindhoven, Netherlands -46 kg
- (silver) 2010 European Team Championships - Baku, Azerbaijan team
