= 1998 European Taekwondo Championships =

Taekwondo competition

- Location: Eindhoven, Netherlands
- Start date: 23 October
- End date: 25 October

The 1998 European Taekwondo Championships were held in Eindhoven, Netherlands. The event took place from 23 to 25 October, 1996.

== Medals table ==
* Host nation (Netherlands)

Rank	Nation	Gold	Silver	Bronze	Total
1	Spain	3	3	2	8
2	Turkey	2	3	3	8
3	Russia	2	2	3	7
4	Denmark	2	0	1	3
4	Sweden	2	0	1	3
6	France	1	1	2	4
7	Croatia	1	0	2	3
8	Belgium	1	0	1	2
9	Netherlands*	1	0	0	1
9	Yugoslavia	1	0	0	1
11	Germany	0	2	2	4
12	Greece	0	1	2	3
13	Azerbaijan	0	1	0	1
13	Hungary	0	1	0	1
13	Norway	0	1	0	1
13	Switzerland	0	1	0	1
17	Poland	0	0	3	3
18	Belarus	0	0	2	2
18	Great Britain	0	0	2	2
18	Israel	0	0	2	2
18	Italy	0	0	2	2
22	Cyprus	0	0	1	1
22	Slovenia	0	0	1	1
Totals (23 entries)		16	16	32	64

== Medal summary ==
=== Men ===
Event	Gold	Silver	Bronze
54 kg	Mert Tuncer; Turkey	Christophe Civiletti; France	Andrea Di Girolamo; Italy
54 kg	Mert Tuncer; Turkey	Christophe Civiletti; France	Juan Antonio Ramos; Spain
58 kg	Sedat Bekdemir; Turkey	Gabriel Esparza; Spain	Andrei Prtukov; Russia
58 kg	Sedat Bekdemir; Turkey	Gabriel Esparza; Spain	Alexander Seethaler; Germany
62 kg	Stefan Santos; Sweden	Iván Ron; Spain	Shirwan Hasan; Denmark
62 kg	Stefan Santos; Sweden	Iván Ron; Spain	David Thompson; Great Britain
67 kg	Jesper Roesen; Denmark	Özgür Güneş; Germany	Ioanis Yeoryos; Greece
67 kg	Jesper Roesen; Denmark	Özgür Güneş; Germany	Bahri Tanrıkulu; Turkey
72 kg	Zoran Krajčinović; Yugoslavia	Ertan Baştuğ; Turkey	Loik Laloum; Israel
72 kg	Zoran Krajčinović; Yugoslavia	Ertan Baştuğ; Turkey	Giorgos Mikellis; Cyprus
78 kg	José Jesús Márquez; Spain	Fagan Umudov; Azerbaijan	Bekir Aydın; Turkey
78 kg	José Jesús Márquez; Spain	Fagan Umudov; Azerbaijan	Dragoslav Zarič; Slovenia
84 kg	Zoran Prerad; Belgium	Yasin Yağız; Turkey	Mickaël Borot; France
84 kg	Zoran Prerad; Belgium	Yasin Yağız; Turkey	Mijalis Tolios; Greece
+84 kg	Pascal Gentil; France	Ken Holter; Norway	Paweł Nowak; Poland
+84 kg	Pascal Gentil; France	Ken Holter; Norway	Marcus Thorén; Sweden

=== Women ===
Event	Gold	Silver	Bronze
47 kg	Brigitte Yagüe; Spain	Eszter Horvölgyi; Hungary	Yulia Demchenkova; Russia
47 kg	Brigitte Yagüe; Spain	Eszter Horvölgyi; Hungary	Louise Gill; Great Britain
51 kg	Hanne Poulsen; Denmark	Döndü Güvenç; Turkey	Sabina Gaspar; Spain
51 kg	Hanne Poulsen; Denmark	Döndü Güvenç; Turkey	Eva Politeo; Croatia
55 kg	Ekaterina Nasarova; Russia	Christiana Bach; Switzerland	Pamela Agostinelli; Italy
55 kg	Ekaterina Nasarova; Russia	Christiana Bach; Switzerland	Serap Öztürk; Turkey
59 kg	Virginia Lourens; Netherlands	Olga Michaleva; Russia	Elia Madar; Israel
59 kg	Virginia Lourens; Netherlands	Olga Michaleva; Russia	Agnieszka Skaradzińska; Poland
63 kg	Karin Schwartz; Denmark	Luisa Arnanz; Spain	Yulia Sukhavitskaya; Belarus
63 kg	Karin Schwartz; Denmark	Luisa Arnanz; Spain	Ekaterina Noskova; Russia
67 kg	Elena Benítez; Spain	Leslie-Ellen Lanz; Germany	Audrey Maurice; France
67 kg	Elena Benítez; Spain	Leslie-Ellen Lanz; Germany	Alesiya Charnyovskaya; Belarus
72 kg	Natalia Ivanova; Russia	Ekaterina Bassi; Greece	Iva Gavez; Croatia
72 kg	Natalia Ivanova; Russia	Ekaterina Bassi; Greece	Justyna Talan; Poland
+72 kg	Nataša Vezmar; Croatia	Maria Koniakhina; Russia	Bettina Hipf; Germany
+72 kg	Nataša Vezmar; Croatia	Maria Koniakhina; Russia	Laurence Rase; Belgium
