= 1976 European Taekwondo Championships =

Taekwondo competition

- Location: Barcelona, Spain
- Start date: 22 May
- End date: 23 May

The 1976 European Taekwondo Championships were held in Barcelona Spain between May 22 and 23, 1976 under the organization of the European Taekwondo Union (ETU) and the Spanish Federation of Taekwondo. The competition was held at the Palau Blaugrana.

== Medal table ==
* Host nation (Spain)

Rank	Nation	Gold	Silver	Bronze	Total
1	Netherlands	2	2	1	5
2	West Germany	2	0	5	7
3	Spain*	1	2	7	10
4	Turkey	1	2	0	3
5	Italy	1	0	1	2
6	Great Britain	1	0	0	1
7	Austria	0	1	1	2
8	Belgium	0	1	0	1
9	France	0	0	1	1
Totals (9 entries)		8	8	16	32

== Medalist ==
Weight	Gold	Silver	Bronze
48 kg	(Germany) Eddi Klimt	(Turkey) Osman Kara	(Spain) Domingo Martínez (Spain) Jesús Martín
53 kg	(Turkey) Murat Gollo	(Spain) Fernando Vadillo	(Spain) Eduardo Merchán (Germany) Gisbert Osterwald
58 kg	(Italy) Josef Ascanio	(Turkey) Kaya Kıraç	(Spain) Eugenio Castro (Germany) Helmut Schneider
63 kg	(Germany) Christian Strysch	(Belgium) Peter Hauswald	(Germany) Wolfgang Dahmen (Spain) Hugo Villamide
68 kg	(United Kingdom) Lindsay Lawrence	(Netherlands) Jan Wanrooy	(France) Eric Gancylus (Germany) Hubert Leuchter
74 kg	(Netherlands) Walter van Emerik	(Spain) Antonio Vicent	(Italy) Francesco Sanila (Germany) Josef Steinberger
80 kg	(Netherlands) Tini Dona	(Austria) Wolfgang Schindl	(Spain) Pedro Secorum (Netherlands) Ben van der Wal
90 kg	(Spain) José Izquierdo	(Netherlands) Ad van Emerik	(Spain) Francisco Vallecillo (Austria) Reza Zademohammad
