= Burcu Sallakoğlu =

Turkish taekwondo practitioner

Personal information
- Nationality: Turkish
- Born: August 13, 1987 (age 39)

Sport
- Country: Turkey
- Sport: Taekwondo
- Event: Heavyweight (72 kg)
- Club: Büyükşehir Belediye Ankara SK
Medal record
Women's Taekwondo
Representing Turkey
World Championships
European Championships
Silver medal – second place	2008 Rome	Heavyweight

Burcu Sallakoğlu (born August 13, 1987) is a Turkish female taekwondo practitioner competing in the heavyweight (72 kg) class. She is from Adana. She is a member of the Büyükşehir Belediye Ankara SK.

== Personal life ==
She grew up in a family with domestic violence. Her father used to mistreat her mother. The family's financial status was very good, but there was not an atmosphere of peace. Her parents had severe cultural differences due to parentage.

The family spent almost all assets for the father's therapy. Burcu's father died at the age of 35 from leukemia. Her mother made self-sacrifice, and tried to run her husband's business, however, without success. The family came into major financial difficulties. Burcu was at the age of twelve.

At this time, she began with taekwondo at Adana Tezel Aslanlar, a nearby sport club, where her coach Rıdvan Kurt and his wife gave her a warm familiar atmosphere. She liked taekwondo much, which helped her to forget all the bad things she experienced before.

She was educated in English-speaking schools and learnt playing the piano as her father was alive. However, she then dropped out of the high school, only to complete her secondary education in later years.

== Sport career ==
In 2011, she left her club Adana Tezel Aslanlar, where she competed in youth and junior categories, to join the Büyükşehir Belediye Ankara SK.

Burcu Sallakoğlu won the silver medal in heavyweight at the 2008 European Taekwondo Championships held in Rome, Italy.

== Achievements ==
- (bronze) 2005 German Open - Bonn, Germany -67 kg
- (bronze) 2008 A-Class German Open - Hamburg, Germany -72 kg
- (silver) 2008 European Championships - Rome, Italy -72 kg
