= Shahrun Yusifova =

Azerbaijani taekwondo practitioner

Medal record

Women's Taekwondo

Representing Azerbaijan

European Championships
Bronze medal – third place	2005 Riga	Finweight
Silver medal – second place	2006 Bonn	Finweight

Shahrun Yusifova (Azerbaijani: Şəhrun Yusifova), born March 23, 1984, is a female Azerbaijani Taekwondo practitioner.
