= Sedat Bekdemir =

Turkish taekwondo practitioner

Sport
- Country: Turkey
- Sport: Taekwondo
Medal record
Men's taekwondo
Representing Turkey
European Championships
Gold medal – first place	1998 Eindhoven	–58 kg
Silver medal – second place	1996 Helsinki	–58 kg
Bronze medal – third place	1992 Valencia	–54 kg

Sedat Bekdemir is a Turkish taekwondo practitioner. He won three medals at the European Taekwondo Championships between 1992 and 1998.
