= Miet Filipović =

Croatian taekwondo practitioner (born 1975)

Medal record

Representing Croatia

Women's taekwondo

World Championships
Bronze medal – third place	1995 Manila	60 kg
Bronze medal – third place	1997 Hong Kong	60 kg

European Championships
Gold medal – first place	2004 Lillehammer	63 kg
Bronze medal – third place	1996 Helsinki	60 kg

Miet Filipović (born 17 June 1975) is a retired Croatian taekwondo practitioner. Her international competitive career spanned from 1992 to 2005. Her greatest success was winning gold at the 2004 European Taekwondo Championships.

== Sources ==
- Miet Filipović at TaekwondoData.com
- Gizdić, Jurica (2016). Hrvatski olimpijci i odličnici (PDF) (in Croatian). Croatian Olympic Committee. p. 249. ISBN 978-953-7912-05-5.
