= Elnur Amanov =

Azerbaijani taekwondo practitioner

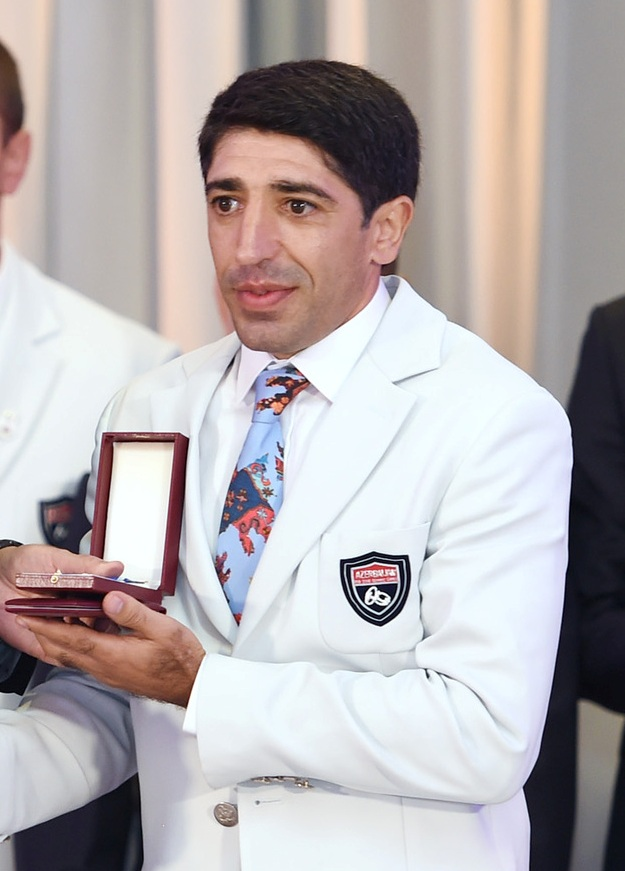

Medal record

Men's taekwondo

Representing Azerbaijan

European Championships
Bronze medal – third place	2002 Samsun	Flyweight
Silver medal – second place	2004 Lillehammer	Flyweight
Silver medal – second place	2005 Riga	Flyweight
Gold medal – first place	2008 Rome	Flyweight

Elnur Amanov (Azerbaijani: Elnur Amanov, born 13 July 1977 in Baku, Azerbaijani SSR) is an Azerbaijani taekwondo athlete.

Amanov won a gold medal at the 2008 European Taekwondo Championships in Rome.
