= 2009 World Taekwondo Championships – Men's welterweight =

Taekwondo competition

Men's welterweight at the 2009 World Championships
- Venue: Ballerup Super Arena
- Dates: 14 October 2009
- Competitors: 64 from 64 nations

Medalists
gold medal	Steven López	United States
silver medal	Nicolás García	Spain
bronze medal	Sébastien Michaud	Canada
bronze medal	Rashad Ahmadov	Azerbaijan

The Men's Welterweight is a competition featured at the 2009 World Taekwondo Championships, and was held at the Ballerup Super Arena in Copenhagen, Denmark on October 14. Welterweights were limited to a maximum of 80 kilograms in body mass.

== Results ==
Legend

- DQ — Won by disqualification

=== Finals ===
Semifinals		Final
Sébastien Michaud (CAN)	1
Steven López (USA)	4	Steven López (USA)	0
Rashad Ahmadov (AZE)	2	Nicolás García (ESP)	0
Nicolás García (ESP)	4

=== Top Half ===
==== Section 1 ====
Round of 64
Mauro Sarmiento (ITA)	6
Ivan Trajkovič (SLO)	5
Chen Zhiquan (MAC)	3
Sergio Samada (CUB)	4
Miguel Ferrera (HON)	4
Marko Gavranić (CRO)	5
Lương Minh Đạt (VIE)	4
Abdulqader Hikmat (QAT)	2
Sébastien Michaud (CAN)	14
Fronzie Charles (GRN)	5
Marlon Avenido (PHI)	4
Nikolaos Tzellos (GRE)	6
Vitoldas Dzikevič (LTU)	7
Moise Timanty (BEN)	1
Andriy Yuza (UKR)	2
Arman Yeremyan (ARM)	7

Round of 32
Mauro Sarmiento (ITA)	8
Sergio Samada (CUB)	2
Marko Gavranić (CRO)	1
Lương Minh Đạt (VIE)	2
Sébastien Michaud (CAN)	4
Nikolaos Tzellos (GRE)	3
Vitoldas Dzikevičius (LTU)	1
Arman Yeremyan (ARM)	7

Round of 16
Mauro Sarmiento (ITA)	11
Lương Minh Đạt (VIE)	0
Sébastien Michaud (CAN)	2
Arman Yeremyan (ARM)	1

Quarterfinals
Mauro Sarmiento (ITA)	1
Sébastien Michaud (CAN)	3

==== Section 2 ====
Round of 64
Seydou Gbané (CIV)	7
Salah Saleh Kheer (LBA)	4
Ronnie Jackson (SUR)	2
Farzad Abdollahi (IRI)	12
Sergey Pak (KAZ)	4
Serdal Yüksel (TUR)	3
Ashraf Qatanani (SWE)	5
Ángel Román (PUR)	2
Luis Rodríguez (VEN)	12
Alefosio Toelupe (SAM)	4
Jelle Vicca (BEL)	4
Radomir Samardžić (SRB)	7
~~Ibeld Remaderet (CAF)~~
Piotr Paziński (POL)	DQ
~~Roman Rusinov (ISR)~~
Steven López (USA)	DQ

Round of 32
Seydou Gbané (CIV)	1
Farzad Abdollahi (IRI)	9
Sergey Pak (KAZ)	2
Ashraf Qatanani (SWE)	1
Luis Rodríguez (VEN)	3
Radomir Samardžić (SRB)	4
Piotr Paziński (POL)	1
Steven López (USA)	5

Round of 16
Farzad Abdollahi (IRI)	10
Sergey Pak (KAZ)	2
Radomir Samardžić (SRB)	2
Steven López (USA)	4

Quarterfinals
Farzad Abdollahi (IRI)
Steven López (USA)	DQ

=== Bottom Half ===
==== Section 3 ====
Round of 64
Rashad Ahmadov (AZE)	6
Amir Katana (BIH)	0
~~Alisher Gulov (TJK)~~
Liao Kuo (TPE)	DQ
~~Tarek Makdessi (LIB)~~
Wang Xingwei (CHN)	DQ
Jasur Baykuziyev (UZB)	10
Mamedy Doucara (FRA)	10
Richard Alcántara (DOM)	5
Mahir Unalan (AUS)	5
Avet Osmanov (RUS)	1
Efezino Akpotu (NGR)	0
Kenta Miyagawa (JPN)	DQ
~~Björn Thorleifsson (ISL)~~
Duwal Asprilla (COL)
Aaron Cook (GBR)	DQ

Round of 32
Rashad Ahmadov (AZE)	14
Liao Kuo (TPE)	3
Wang Xinwei (CHN)	2
Jasur Baykuziyev (UZB)	4
Richard Alcántara (DOM)	6
Avet Osmanov (RUS)	5
Kenta Miyagawa (JPN)	4
Aaron Cook (GBR)	6

Round of 16
Rashad Ahmadov (AZE)	1
Jasur Baykuziyev (UZB)	0
Richard Alcántara (DOM)	5
Aaron Cook (GBR)	16

Quarterfinals
Rashad Ahmadov (AZE)	5
Aaron Cook (GBR)	4

==== Section 4 ====
Round of 64
Nicolás García (ESP)	3
Carlos Rodríguez (AND)	1
~~Patroba Abade (KEN)~~
Dimitris Moustakas (CYP)	DQ
Stuart Cilbert (ARU)	11
Bassoum Mamoudou (HAI)	8
Robert Honningdalsnes (NOR)	4
Tcherry Tchouake (CMR)	2
José Luis Ramírez (MEX)	11
Fanfan Kikima (COD)	2
Ahmed Benaddou (MAR)	2
Anders Karlsen (DEN)	9
André Bilia (BRA)	2
Tomáš Hrdina (CZE)	0
Park Jung-ho (KOR)	4
Oumar Cissé (MLI)	5

Round of 32
Nicolás García (ESP)	3
Dimitris Moustakas (CYP)	2
Stuart Cilbert (ARU)	5
Robert Honningdalsnes (NOR)	3
José Luis Ramírez (MEX)	3
Anders Karlsen (DEN)	2
André Bilia (BRA)	1
Oumar Cissé (MLI)	3

Round of 16
Nicolás García (ESP)	9
Stuart Cilbert (ARU)	2
José Luis Ramírez (MEX)	3
Oumar Cissé (MLI)	2

Quarterfinals
Nicolás García (ESP)	4
José Luis Ramírez (MEX)	1
