= Sibel Güler =

Turkish taekwondo practitioner

Sibel Güler Sağır
Personal information
- Nationality: Turkey
- Born: Sibel Güler; 28 September 1984 (age 41) Bulgaria
- Height: 1.72 m (5 ft 7 1/2 in)
- Weight: 63 kg (139 lb)

Sport
- Country: Turkey
- Sport: Taekwondo
- Event: 67 kg
- Club: TSE Spor Kulübü
Medal record
Women's taekwondo
Representing Turkey
Universiade
Silver medal – second place	2007 Bangkok	67 kg
Gold medal – first place	2005 İzmir	67 kg
European Championships
Bronze medal – third place	2008 Rome	67 kg
Gold medal – first place	2006 Bonn	67 kg
Bronze medal – third place	2005 Riga	67 kg
Gold medal – first place	2004 Lillehammer	67 kg

Sibel Güler Sağır (born September 28, 1984) is a Turkish taekwondo practitioner. She is a four-time medalist and two-time defending champion at the European Taekwondo Championships since 2004. She also claimed the middleweight division title at the 2005 Summer Universiade in İzmir, but won a silver medal at the 2007 Summer Universiade in Bangkok, Thailand, losing out to Chinese Taipei's Lin An-Ni in the final match.

Guler competed for the women's middleweight category (67 kg) at the 2008 Summer Olympics in Beijing, after defeating Greek taekwondo jin and Olympic silver medalist Elisavet Mystakidou in the final match of the European Qualification Tournament in Istanbul. She lost the first preliminary match to Argentina's Vanina Sánchez, who was able to score four points at the end of the game.

== Family life ==
She was born to Cevat Güler and his wife Gülten, a Turkish family in Bulgaria. Sibel has a brother Sunay.

Sibel Güler was interested in swimming before she immigrated to Turkey with her family in 1989. During her school years in Turkey, she played in the volleyball team. In 1995, she began with taekwondo supported by her mother. With gaining success, she was transferred to TSE club in Ankara.

Güler studied at the School of Physical Education and Sports of Ankara University graduating in 2008. She has been a member of the Turkish women's national taekwondo team since 2000.

On August 30, 2008, she married Taner Sağır, a world and Olympic weightlifting champion and a fellow immigrant from Bulgaria. The couple has a child. The family resides in Ankara in a street named after Sağır.
