= 2008 European Taekwondo Championships =

Taekwondo competition

- Location: Rome, Italy
- Start date: 10 April
- End date: 13 April

The 2008 European Taekwondo Championships were held in Rome, Italy. The event took place from April 10 to April 13, 2008.

== Medal table ==
* Host nation (Italy)

| Rank | Nation | Gold | Silver | Bronze | Total |
|---|---|---|---|---|---|
| 1 | Turkey (TUR) | 3 | 3 | 3 | 9 |
| 2 | Germany (GER) | 3 | 1 | 3 | 7 |
| 3 | Spain (ESP) | 2 | 1 | 2 | 5 |
| 4 | Greece (GRE) | 2 | 0 | 1 | 3 |
| 5 | France (FRA) | 1 | 2 | 3 | 6 |
| 6 | Russia (RUS) | 1 | 1 | 1 | 3 |
| 6 | Sweden (SWE) | 1 | 1 | 1 | 3 |
| 8 | Azerbaijan (AZE) | 1 | 1 | 0 | 2 |
| 8 | Croatia (CRO) | 1 | 1 | 0 | 2 |
| 10 | Armenia (ARM) | 1 | 0 | 0 | 1 |
| 11 | Great Britain (GBR) | 0 | 2 | 2 | 4 |
| 12 | Italy (ITA)* | 0 | 1 | 5 | 6 |
| 13 | Ukraine (UKR) | 0 | 1 | 1 | 2 |
| 14 | Austria (AUT) | 0 | 1 | 0 | 1 |
| 15 | Netherlands (NED) | 0 | 0 | 2 | 2 |
| 16 | Belarus (BLR) | 0 | 0 | 1 | 1 |
| 16 | Bulgaria (BUL) | 0 | 0 | 1 | 1 |
| 16 | Czech Republic (CZE) | 0 | 0 | 1 | 1 |
| 16 | Denmark (DEN) | 0 | 0 | 1 | 1 |
| 16 | Israel (ISR) | 0 | 0 | 1 | 1 |
| 16 | Norway (NOR) | 0 | 0 | 1 | 1 |
| 16 | Poland (POL) | 0 | 0 | 1 | 1 |
| 16 | Serbia (SRB) | 0 | 0 | 1 | 1 |
| Totals (23 entries) | | 16 | 16 | 32 | 64 |

== Men ==
| Weight | Gold | Silver | Bronze |
|---|---|---|---|
| −54 kg | (Russia) Seyfula Magomedov | (Sweden) Daniel Kurvinen | (Spain) Vicente Muriel Arias (Denmark) Surachet Singsorn |
| −58 kg | (Azerbaijan) Elnur Amanov | (Germany) Boris Winkler | (Turkey) Fırat Pozan (United Kingdom) Tyrone Robinson |
| −62 kg | (Germany) Levent Tuncat | (United Kingdom) Martin Stamper | (Russia) Dmitry Frank (Poland) Maciej Ruta |
| −67 kg | (Turkey) Servet Tazegül | (Azerbaijan) Ilkin Shahbazov | (Germany) Daniel Manz (Netherlands) Dennis Bekkers |
| −72 kg | (Turkey) Rıdvan Baygut | (Austria) Manuel Mark | (Greece) Anestis Nikolaidis (Netherlands) Tommy Mollet |
| −78 kg | (Armenia) Arman Yeremyan | (Spain) Nicolás García | (Germany) Bashir Adam (France) Mamedi Doucara |
| −84 kg | (Greece) Konstantinos Gkoltsios | (Turkey) Bahri Tanrıkulu | (Italy) Mauro Sarmiento (Serbia) Radomir Samardžić |
| +84 kg | (Greece) Alexandros Nikolaidis | (France) Pascal Gentil | (Italy) Leonardo Basile (Spain) Mikel Bernal Fernandez |

== Women ==
| Weight | Gold | Silver | Bronze |
|---|---|---|---|
| −47 kg | (Germany) Sümeyye Güleç | (Turkey) Kadriye Selimoğlu | (Bulgaria) Iliana Eneva (United Kingdom) Louise Mair |
| −51 kg | (Spain) Brigitte Yague Enrique | (United Kingdom) Caroline Fisher | (Israel) Anna Mirkin (France) Maeva Coutant |
| −55 kg | (Turkey) Hatice Kübra Yangın | (Russia) Margarita Mkrtchyan | (Belarus) Yuliya Smychkova (Italy) Eleonora Platania |
| −59 kg | (Spain) Estefania Hernandez Garcia | (Croatia) Martina Zubčić | (Italy) Cristiana Corsi (Sweden) Elin Johansson |
| −63 kg | (France) Marlène Harnois | (Ukraine) Olga Cherkun | (Turkey) Hamide Bıkçın Tosun (Italy) Margherita Zocco |
| −67 kg | (Germany) Helena Fromm | (France) Gwladys Épangue | (Czech Republic) Simona Hradilova (Turkey) Sibel Güler |
| −72 kg | (Croatia) Sandra Šarić | (Turkey) Burcu Sallakoğlu | (Norway) Nina Solheim (Germany) Julia Swietkowiak |
| +72 kg | (Sweden) Karolina Kedzierska | (Italy) Daniela Castrignano | (Ukraine) Maryna Konieva (France) Anne Caroline Graffe |
