= European Junior Taekwondo Championships =

Taekwondo competition

Competition details
- Discipline: Taekwondo
- Type: kyourugui, biennial
- Organiser: European Taekwondo Union (ETU)

History
- First edition: 1978
- Editions: 2025 (25)

European Taekwondo Junior Championships is a European biennial championship organized for juniors age category by European Taekwondo Union, first held in 1978. The event is contested every two years.

== History ==
Age Groups:

1. U21: Since 2025 (18-21 Years)
2. U18: Since 1996 (15-18 Years)
3. U15: Since 2014 (12-15 Years)
4. U12: Children

== Editions ==
=== U21 ===
| Number | Edition | Host City | Country | Champion | Events |
|---|---|---|---|---|---|
| 1 | 2009 | Vigo | Spain | Russia | 18 |
| 2 | 2010 | Kharkiv | Ukraine | Turkey | 16 |
| 3 | 2012 | Athens | Greece | Russia | 16 |
| 4 | 2013 | Chișinău | Moldova | Russia | 16 |
| 5 | 2014 | Innsbruck | Austria | Spain | 16 |
| 6 | 2015 | Bucharest | Romania | Russia | 16 |
| 7 | 2016 | Grozny | Russia | Russia | 16 |
| 8 | 2017 | Sofia | Bulgaria | Russia | 16 |
| 9 | 2018 | Warsaw | Poland | Russia | 16 |
| 10 | 2019 | Helsingborg | Sweden | Russia | 16 |

- 2020 Not Held
- 2021 Not Held
- 2022 European U21 Taekwondo Championships
- 2023 European U21 Taekwondo Championships
- 2024 European U21 Taekwondo Championships
- 2025 European U21 Taekwondo Championships

=== U18 ===
| Edition | Year | Host city | Country | Date |
|---|---|---|---|---|
| 1 | 1978 | Munich | Germany | |
| 2 | 1980 | Esbjerg | Denmark | |
| 3 | 1982 | Rome | Italy | |
| 4 | 1984 | Stuttgart | Germany | |
| 5 | 1986 | Seefeld | Austria | |
| 6 | 1988 | Ankara | Turkey | |
| 7 | 1990 | Aarhus | Denmark | |
| 8 | 1992 | Paris | France | |
| 9 | 1994 | Bucharest | Romania | |
| 10 | 1996 | Zagreb | Croatia | |
| 11 | 1997 | Patras | Greece | 15–17 September |
| 12 | 1999 | Paphos | Cyprus | 15–17 April |
| 13 | 2001 | Pamplona | Spain | 5–7 April |
| 14 | 2003 | Heraklion | Greece | 28 February – 2 March |
| 15 | 2005 | Baku | Azerbaijan | 26–28 May |
| 16 | 2007 | Baku | Azerbaijan | 26–28 October |
| 17 | 2009 | Trelleborg | Sweden | 28–30 May |
| 18 | 2011 | Paphos | Cyprus | 6–8 October |
| 19 | 2013 | Porto | Portugal | 26–29 September |
| 20 | 2015 | Daugavpils | Latvia | 22–25 October |
| 21 | 2017 | Larnaca | Cyprus | 2–5 November |
| 22 | 2019 | Marina d'Or | Spain | 4–6 October |
| 23 | 2021 | Sarajevo | Bosnia and Herzegovina | 12–15 November |
| 24 | 2023 | Tallinn | Estonia | 24–26 August |
| 25 | 2025 | Aigle | Switzerland | 19–21 November |

=== U15 ===
1. 2005 Palermo
2. 2007 Budapest
3. 2009 Zagreb
4. 2011 Tbilisi
5. 2013 Bucharest
6. 2015 Strasbourg
7. 2016 Bucharest
8. 2017 Budapest
9. 2018 Oropesa del Mar
10. 2019 Oropesa del Mar
11. 2020 Sarajevo
12. 2021 Tallinn
13. 2022 Pembroke
14. 2023 Belgrade
15. 2024 Tirana
16. 2025 Athens

== Medals ==
=== U18 (1978–2023) ===
| Rank | Nation | Gold | Silver | Bronze | Total |
|---|---|---|---|---|---|
| 1 | Russia | 64 | 37 | 49 | 150 |
| 2 | Turkey | 57 | 44 | 62 | 163 |
| 3 | Spain | 53 | 40 | 78 | 171 |
| 4 | Germany | 36 | 35 | 56 | 127 |
| 5 | Greece | 23 | 19 | 51 | 93 |
| 6 | Italy | 22 | 23 | 40 | 85 |
| 7 | Croatia | 17 | 22 | 39 | 78 |
| 8 | France | 14 | 13 | 42 | 69 |
| 9 | Great Britain | 13 | 12 | 30 | 55 |
| 10 | Denmark | 13 | 12 | 23 | 48 |
| 11 | Azerbaijan | 12 | 6 | 21 | 39 |
| 12 | Netherlands | 10 | 19 | 29 | 58 |
| 13 | Ukraine | 6 | 12 | 24 | 42 |
| 14 | Serbia | 6 | 8 | 12 | 26 |
| 15 | Belarus | 5 | 10 | 20 | 35 |
| 16 | Belgium | 5 | 3 | 20 | 28 |
| 17 | Hungary | 4 | 4 | 6 | 14 |
| 18 | Sweden | 3 | 7 | 18 | 28 |
| 19 | Slovenia | 3 | 2 | 3 | 8 |
| 20 | Austria | 2 | 6 | 7 | 15 |
| 21 | Bulgaria | 2 | 2 | 3 | 7 |
| 22 | Cyprus | 1 | 7 | 13 | 21 |
| 23 | Poland | 1 | 5 | 22 | 28 |
| 24 | Armenia | 1 | 4 | 6 | 11 |
| 25 | Israel | 1 | 3 | 9 | 13 |
| 26 | Switzerland | 1 | 0 | 2 | 3 |
| 27 | Moldova | 0 | 5 | 6 | 11 |
| 28 | Bosnia and Herzegovina | 0 | 2 | 8 | 10 |
| 28 | Yugoslavia | 0 | 2 | 8 | 10 |
| 30 | Ireland | 0 | 2 | 3 | 5 |
| 31 | Romania | 0 | 2 | 2 | 4 |
| 32 | Finland | 0 | 1 | 6 | 7 |
| 32 | Norway | 0 | 1 | 6 | 7 |
| 32 | Portugal | 0 | 1 | 6 | 7 |
| 35 | Georgia | 0 | 1 | 3 | 4 |
| 35 | Lithuania | 0 | 1 | 3 | 4 |
| 37 | Czech Republic | 0 | 0 | 4 | 4 |
| 38 | Latvia | 0 | 0 | 3 | 3 |
| Totals (38 entries) | | 375 | 373 | 743 | 1,491 |

== See also ==
- European Taekwondo Championships
- European Taekwondo Championships Olympic Weight Categories
- European Universities Taekwondo Championships
- World Junior Taekwondo Championships
- Asian Junior Taekwondo Championships
- Ocean Junior Taekwondo Championships
- African Junior Taekwondo Championships
- Pan American Junior Taekwondo Championships
