= Raid Rasheed =

Iraqi taekwondo practitioner

Personal information
- Full name: Raid Rasheed Abbas
- Nationality: Iraq
- Born: 1 January 1976 (age 50) Baghdad, Iraq
- Height: 1.80 m (5 ft 11 in)
- Weight: 80 kg (176 lb)

Sport
- Sport: Taekwondo
- Event: 80 kg

Raid Rasheed Abbas (Arabic: رائد رشيد عباس; born January 1, 1976, in Baghdad) is an Iraqi taekwondo practitioner, who competed in the men's welterweight category at the 2004 Summer Olympics.

Rasheed qualified as a lone taekwondo fighter for the Iraqi squad in the men's welterweight class (80 kg) at the 2004 Summer Olympics in Athens, by granting a tripartite invitation from the International Taekwondo Federation under the Olympic Solidarity program. Rasheed suffered in a merciless 0–12 defeat to U.S. taekwondo jin and eventual Olympic champion Steven López during his opening match, stimulating a mighty hoot and a raucous chant "Iraq, Iraq!" from the majority of the crowd inside Faliro Coastal Zone Olympic Complex. Following Lopez' progress towards the final, Rasheed was scheduled to fight against Mexico's Víctor Estrada in the first playoff of the repechage bracket, but pulled himself out of tournament due to injuries sustained from the opening bout.
