= Patrick Stevens (taekwondo) =

Dutch taekwondo practitioner

Personal information
- Full name: Patrick Stevens
- Nationality: Netherlands
- Born: 15 July 1979 (age 47) Alphen aan den Rijn, Netherlands
- Height: 1.84 m (6 ft 1/2 in)
- Weight: 80 kg (176 lb)

Sport
- Sport: Taekwondo
- Event: 80 kg
Medal record
Men's taekwondo
Representing the Netherlands
European Championships
Silver medal – second place	2004 Lillehammer	84 kg
Bronze medal – third place	2002 Samsun	84 kg
Bronze medal – third place	2005 Riga	84 kg

Patrick Stevens (born 15 July 1979, in Alphen aan den Rijn) is a Dutch taekwondo practitioner, who competed in the men's welterweight category. He yielded three medals (one silver and two bronze) in the 84-kg division at the European Championships between 2002 and 2005, and represented his nation Netherlands at the 2004 Summer Olympics.

Stevens qualified for the two-member Dutch taekwondo squad in the men's welterweight class (80 kg) at the 2004 Summer Olympics in Athens, by placing third and granting a berth from the European Olympic Qualifying Tournament in Baku, Azerbaijan. He crashed out in the opening match to the French taekwondo jin Christophe Negrel with a score of 10–13. With Negrel being defeated by Azerbaijan's Rashad Ahmadov in the quarterfinal, Stevens denied his chance to compete for the Olympic bronze medal through the repechage.
