= 1996 European Taekwondo Championships =

Taekwondo competition

- Location: Helsinki, Finland
- Start date: 26 October
- End date: 27 October

The 1996 European Taekwondo Championships were held in Helsinki, Finland. The event took place from 26 to 27 October, 1996.

== Medals table ==
* Host nation (Finland)

Rank	Nation	Gold	Silver	Bronze	Total
1	Spain	6	1	3	10
2	Netherlands	2	2	0	4
3	Sweden	2	1	4	7
4	Germany	2	1	3	6
5	France	1	1	2	4
5	Russia	1	1	2	4
7	Denmark	1	1	1	3
7	Italy	1	1	1	3
9	Turkey	0	4	4	8
10	Great Britain	0	2	0	2
11	Yugoslavia	0	1	1	2
12	Finland*	0	0	4	4
13	Croatia	0	0	3	3
14	Azerbaijan	0	0	1	1
14	Belgium	0	0	1	1
14	Poland	0	0	1	1
14	Portugal	0	0	1	1
Totals (17 entries)		16	16	32	64

== Medal summary ==
=== Men ===
Event	Gold	Silver	Bronze
50 kg	Juan Antonio Ramos; Spain	Paul Green; Great Britain	Carlos Chamorro; Sweden
50 kg	Juan Antonio Ramos; Spain	Paul Green; Great Britain	Viacheslav Nezhichkin; Russia
54 kg	José Blanca; Spain	Harun Ateş; Turkey	Sven Kim; Sweden
54 kg	José Blanca; Spain	Harun Ateş; Turkey	Ludovic Vo; France
58 kg	Gabriel Esparza; Spain	Sedat Bekdemir; Turkey	Gianluca Attanasio; Italy
58 kg	Gabriel Esparza; Spain	Sedat Bekdemir; Turkey	Achmed Boumrah; Belgium
64 kg	Jesper Roesen; Denmark	Ekrem Boyalı; Turkey	Mika Tarhanen; Finland
64 kg	Jesper Roesen; Denmark	Ekrem Boyalı; Turkey	Francisco Zas; Spain
70 kg	Aziz Acharki; Germany	Youssef Lharraki; Denmark	Hrvoje Bregeš; Croatia
70 kg	Aziz Acharki; Germany	Youssef Lharraki; Denmark	Aitor Rodríguez; Spain
76 kg	Nico Davis; Sweden	Mario De Meo; Italy	Alekper Imamaliev; Azerbaijan
76 kg	Nico Davis; Sweden	Mario De Meo; Italy	Olcay Toprak; France
83 kg	Mikaël Meloul; France	Ivan Brljevic; Sweden	Erol Bayrakçı; Turkey
83 kg	Mikaël Meloul; France	Ivan Brljevic; Sweden	Marcus Nitschke; Germany
+83 kg	Alan Pinontoan; Netherlands	Pascal Gentil; France	Eurypodes Costa; Portugal
+83 kg	Alan Pinontoan; Netherlands	Pascal Gentil; France	Jan Glerup; Denmark

=== Women ===
Event	Gold	Silver	Bronze
43 kg	Cristina Atzeni; Italy	Amelia Calabria; Spain	Pailina Pastene; Sweden
43 kg	Cristina Atzeni; Italy	Amelia Calabria; Spain	Valeria Sombkova; Russia
47 kg	Fadime Helvacioglu; Germany	Venera Sanatulova; Russia	Anna Jönsson; Sweden
47 kg	Fadime Helvacioglu; Germany	Venera Sanatulova; Russia	Kadriye Selimoğlu; Turkey
51 kg	Gill Aringaneng; Netherlands	Aylin Yazıcı; Turkey	Nina Pikkarainen; Finland
51 kg	Gill Aringaneng; Netherlands	Aylin Yazıcı; Turkey	Marijeta Željković; Croatia
55 kg	Eva Wallner; Sweden	Tanja Grubor; Yugoslavia	Laura Salonen; Finland
55 kg	Eva Wallner; Sweden	Tanja Grubor; Yugoslavia	Elisonda Tobau; Spain
60 kg	Luisa Vecina; Spain	Jo-Anne Nash; Great Britain	Miet Filipović; Croatia
60 kg	Luisa Vecina; Spain	Jo-Anne Nash; Great Britain	Agnieszka Skaradzińska; Poland
65 kg	Elena Benítez; Spain	Mirjam Müskens; Netherlands	Sonja Schiedt; Germany
65 kg	Elena Benítez; Spain	Mirjam Müskens; Netherlands	Kirsimarja Koskinen; Finland
70 kg	Irene Arevalu; Spain	Margarita van der Hoeven; Netherlands	Sabine Collin; Germany
70 kg	Irene Arevalu; Spain	Margarita van der Hoeven; Netherlands	Hatice Metin; Turkey
+70 kg	Natalia Ivanova; Russia	Bettina Hipf; Germany	Dubravka Boškov; Yugoslavia
+70 kg	Natalia Ivanova; Russia	Bettina Hipf; Germany	Abbe Kıvrık; Turkey
