= European Taekwondo Championships Olympic Weight Categories =

Taekwondo competition

Competition details
- Discipline: Taekwondo
- Type: kyourugui, biannual
- Organiser: European Taekwondo Union (ETU)

History
- First edition: 2015 in Nalchik, Russia
- Editions: 5 (2023)

The European Taekwondo Championships in Olympic Weight Categories are the European championships in Taekwondo in olympic weight categories, first held in Nalchik in 2015. The event is held annually and is organized by the European Taekwondo Union, the continental affiliate of World Taekwondo. This event is ranked as a G-1 tournament while the main European Championships are ranked as a G-4 tournament.

The championships should not be confused with:

- the European Taekwondo Championships, the main continental event, and ranked as a G-4 by World Taekwondo;
- the European Games taekwondo competitions, which form part of a continental multi-sport event in the Olympic tradition;
- the EITF European Taekwondo Championships, a championships organised by the European International Taekwondo Federation, the continental arm of the International Taekwondo Federation.

== List of championships ==
Edition	Year	Date	City and host country	Venue	Overall champion	Events
1	2015	26–29 March	Nalchik, Russia	Palace of Sports	Turkey	8
2	2017	7–9 December	Sofia, Bulgaria	Asics Arena	Russia	8
3	2019	29–30 November	(Republic of Ireland) Dublin, Ireland	National Sports Campus	Russia	8
4	2020	10–11 December	Sarajevo, Bosnia and Herzegovina	Hotel Hills Sarajevo	France	8
5	2023	24-26 August	Tallinn, Estonia	Viru Hotel	tbd	8

== Medal summary ==
All results from 2015 - 2020:

Rank	Nation	Gold	Silver	Bronze	Total
1	Russia (RUS)	12	7	14	33
2	Turkey (TUR)	4	2	1	7
3	France (FRA)	3	0	5	8
4	Great Britain (GBR)	3	0	3	6
5	Serbia (SRB)	2	4	4	10
6	Croatia (CRO)	2	3	5	10
7	Portugal (POR)	2	1	1	4
8	Israel (ISR)	1	2	0	3
9	Poland (POL)	1	1	5	7
10	North Macedonia (MKD)	1	1	0	2
10	Sweden (SWE)	1	1	0	2
12	Spain (ESP)	0	2	4	6
13	Moldova (MDA)	0	1	3	4
14	Bulgaria (BUL)	0	1	1	2
14	Germany (GER)	0	1	1	2
14	Ireland (IRL)	0	1	1	2
14	Latvia (LAT)	0	1	1	2
14	Netherlands (NED)	0	1	1	2
19	Armenia (ARM)	0	1	0	1
19	Azerbaijan (AZE)	0	1	0	1
21	Ukraine (UKR)	0	0	7	7
22	Italy (ITA)	0	0	2	2
23	Austria (AUT)	0	0	1	1
23	Belarus (BLR)	0	0	1	1
23	Cyprus (CYP)	0	0	1	1
23	Lithuania (LTU)	0	0	1	1
23	Norway (NOR)	0	0	1	1
Totals (27 entries)		32	32	64	128

== See also ==
- European Taekwondo Championships
- European Juniors Taekwondo Championships
- European Universities Taekwondo Championships
