= Carlo Molfetta =

Italian taekwondo practitioner

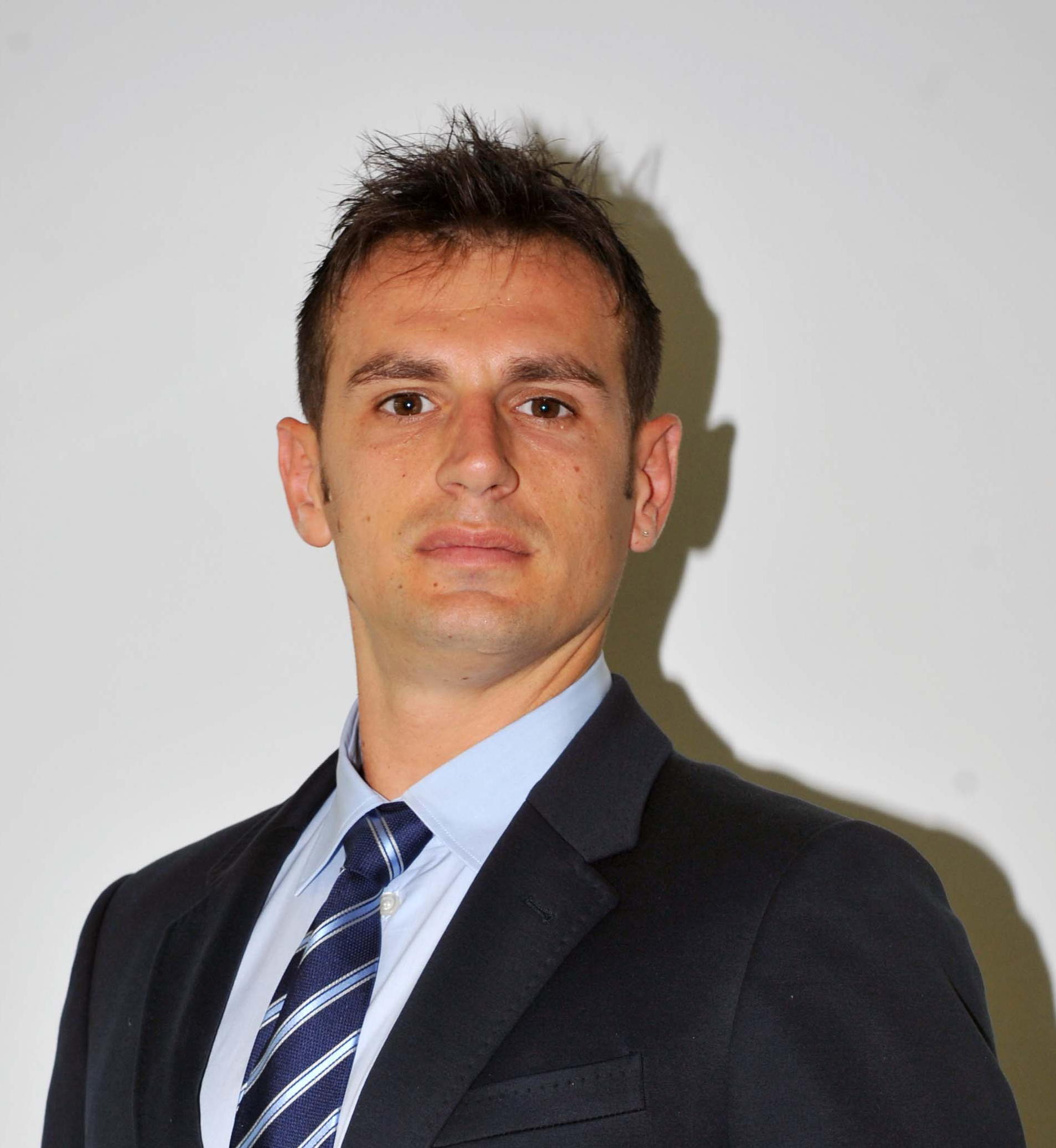

Personal information
- Born: 15 February 1984 (age 42) Mesagne, Italy
- Height: 183 cm (6 ft 0 in)
Medal record
Men's taekwondo
Representing Italy
Olympic Games
Gold medal – first place	2012 London	+80 kg
World Championships
Silver medal – second place	2001 Jeju	Featherweight
Silver medal – second place	2009 Copenhagen	Middleweight
Bronze medal – third place	2011 Gyeongju	Middleweight
European Championships
Gold medal – first place	2010 St. Petersburg	Middleweight
Silver medal – second place	2004 Lillehammer	Lightweight
Bronze medal – third place	2005 Riga	Lightweight
Bronze medal – third place	2012 Manchester	Middleweight
Universiade
Gold medal – first place	2003 Daegu	Lightweight

Carlo Molfetta (born 15 February 1984 in Mesagne) is a taekwondo athlete from Italy, who won gold at the 2012 London Olympics in the men's +80 kg division, beating Gabon's Anthony Obame. Molfetta was determined to be the victor after the bout concluded in a 9-9 tie, with the judges ruling that Molfetta had won based upon superiority.

== Biography ==
He also won the Gold Medal in the 2010 European Taekwondo Championships.
