= Radomir Samardžić =

Serbian taekwondo practitioner

Medal record

Men's taekwondo

Representing Serbia

European Championships
| Bronze medal – third place | 2008 Rome | 84kg |

Radomir Samardžić (Serbian: Радомир Самарџић, born June 17, 1978) is a Serbian taekwondo athlete.

He won a bronze medal at the 2008 European Taekwondo Championships.

Radomir Samardzic has dedicated himself to the study of taekwondo. He has over 20 years of experience as a martial artist and is a world known sparring athlete who has represented Canada, Serbia and Yugoslavia on an international and world level.

Coached by four-time world champion Master Kim InKyung and Olympic gold medalist Dragan Jovic, Radomir Samardzic has achieved significant results, some of which include the following:

2008 Canadian National Team Trails Gold Medalist

2008 European Championships Bronze Medalist

2008 Croatia Open Gold Medalist

2008 Ontario Provincial Champion

2008 Canadian Olympic Divisions Event Champion

2007 Canadian National Championships Silver Medalist

2007 Ontario Provincial Champion

2007 U.S. Open Champion

2006 Commonwealth Championships Silver Medalist

2006 Canadian National Champion

2006 Ontario Provincial Champion

2005 Serbia Open Champion

2005 Canadian National Champion

2005 Ontario Provincial Champion

2005 Black Belt Open Champion

2004 Ontario Provincial Champion

Radomir Samardzic now lives in Ottawa, Canada, and owns the Capital Taekwondo Martial Arts Academy. His teaching philosophy is to encourage all students to develop and achieve their goals through dedication and perseverance. He emphasizes the enjoyment of training in a positive atmosphere while developing great motor skills.
