= Rashad Ahmadov =

Azerbaijani taekwondo practitioner

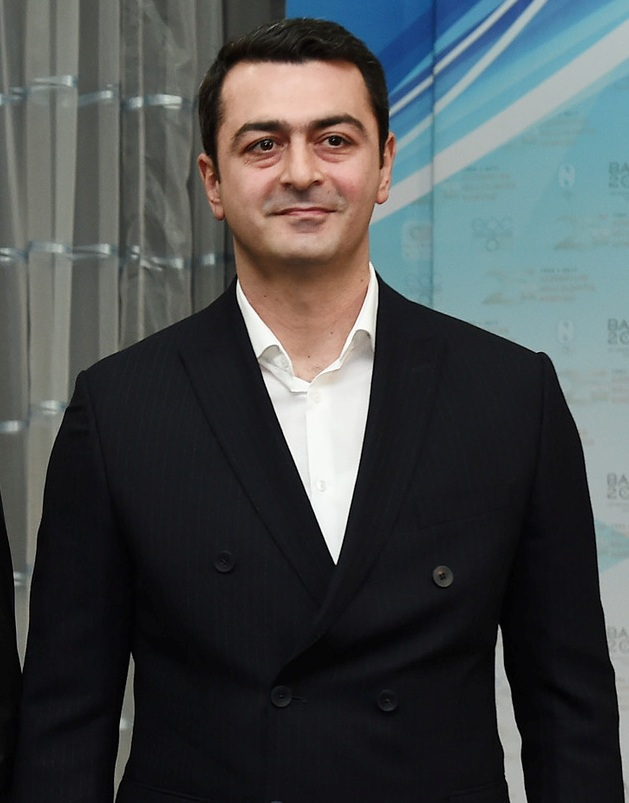

Personal information
- Full name: Rashad Ahmadov
- Nationality: Azerbaijan
- Born: 5 January 1981 (age 45) Yevlax, Azerbaijan SSR, Soviet Union
- Height: 1.84 m (6 ft 1/2 in)
- Weight: 80 kg (176 lb)

Sport
- Sport: Taekwondo
- Event: 80 kg
Medal record
Men's taekwondo
Representing Azerbaijan
World Championships
Bronze medal – third place	2003 Garmisch	72 kg
Bronze medal – third place	2009 Copenhagen	80 kg
European Championships
Silver medal – second place	2002 Samsun	72 kg
Bronze medal – third place	2004 Lillehammer	78 kg
Bronze medal – third place	2005 Riga	78 kg
Silver medal – second place	2006 Bonn	78 kg

Rashad Ahmadov (Azerbaijani: Rəşəd Əhmədov; born January 5, 1981, in Yevlakh) is an Azerbaijani taekwondo practitioner. He is a four-time medalist at the European Taekwondo Championships, and a two-time bronze medalist for the welterweight division at the World Taekwondo Championships (2003 in Garmisch-Partenkirchen, Germany and 2009 in Copenhagen, Denmark).

Ahmadov made his official debut for the 2004 Summer Olympics in Athens, where he competed in the men's welterweight category (80 kg). He defeated Trinidad and Tobago's Chinedum Osuji and France's Christophe Negrel in the first two rounds, before losing out the semi-final match by a superiority decision to Turkey's Bahri Tanrıkulu. Ahmadov was eventually beaten by Iran's Youssef Karami in a close match for the bronze medal, with the final score of 8–9. Following his sudden defeat, the Azerbaijani team stormed the fighting area, and launched a resentful protest at Olympic officials.

At the 2008 Summer Olympics in Beijing, Ahmadov qualified for the second time in the men's 80 kg class after placing second from the European Qualification Tournament in Istanbul, Turkey. Ahmadov defeated Qatar's Abdulqader Hikmat Sarhan in the preliminary round and Canada's Sébastien Michaud by a superiority decision in the quarterfinals. He repeated his fate in the semi-final match from the previous games, when he lost to former heavyweight champion Hadi Saei of Iran, with a score of 1–4. Ahmadov automatically qualified for the bronze medal bout, where he was defeated in a tight match against American taekwondo jin and two-time defending champion Steven López, with a final score of 2–3.
