= European Taekwondo Union =

Taekwondo Union

- Sport: Taekwondo
- Abbreviation: ETU
- Founded: 2 May 1976; 50 years ago
- Affiliation: World Taekwondo
- Headquarters: Oldenzaal, Netherlands

Official website
- europetaekwondo.org

The European Taekwondo Union (ETU) or World Taekwondo Europe (WTE) is the official governing body for all Taekwondo matters in Europe as a regional organisation of World Taekwondo. It comprises the National Taekwondo Federations of all the European member nations and regulates all Taekwondo matters on a continental basis. The first participating countries in the ETU were Spain, Belgium, Austria, Portugal, Germany, Italy, France, Netherlands, Turkey, Greece, Denmark and the UK. The first president was Antonio Garcia de la Fuente. The First European Championships of the ETU were held in Barcelona on May 22–23, 1976. After being considered only a demonstration sports event twice - in Seoul 1988 and Barcelona 1992 - the WTF style (Olympic Style Taekwondo) - was incorporated as a full Olympic discipline in Sydney in 2000. After the 2022 Russian invasion of Ukraine, it was announced that European Taekwondo Union will not recognise taekwondo events organised in Russia and Belarus, and will not host events in either country.

Members of the European Taekwondo Union (WT Style) uses the Poomsae style of teaching Taekwondo.

== Main events ==
- European Taekwondo Championships
- European Taekwondo Championships in Olympic Weights
- European Kids Taekwondo Championships
- European Cadets Taekwondo Championships
- European Juniors Taekwondo Championships
- European U21 Taekwondo Championships
- European Masters Taekwondo Championships
- Multi European Taekwondo Championships (WTE)
- European Clubs Taekwondo Championships
- European Poomsae Taekwondo Championships
- European Online Poomsae Taekwondo Championships
- European Beach Taekwondo Championships
- European Universities Taekwondo Championships
- President Cup Europe (WT)
- European Para Taekwondo Open Championships
- European Hanmadang Taekwondo Championships

== Open ==
- Polish Taekwondo Open
- Russia Taekwondo Open
- Spanish Taekwondo Open
- Turkey Taekwondo Open

== Advancement ==
Advancing through the belts is done by a system of gradings. Gradings are typically held in 3 month cycles at regional training centres. Grading systems will typically consist of line work, patterns, theory, and sparring. Students can typically advance through the belts at a rate of 1 Kup every 3 months. Although it is possible for students who perform exceptionally well during their grading to 'double promote', this means that they gain 2 Kup instead of one. this is however not very common and is only done if the student has exhibited complete understanding of the material they are being tested on as well as control and maturity. A double promotion is not possible for a student of red belt (2nd Kup) because their instructor is not permitted to grade them for their black belt.

=== Belts ===
ETU uses the following system of belt gradings:

- 10th Kup - White belt (white signifies innocence, as a student with no previous knowledge of Taekwondo)
- 9th Kup - White belt with yellow tag
- 8th Kup - Yellow belt (yellow signifies earth, from which the metaphorical plant sprouts forth and takes root as the foundations of Taekwondo are laid)
- 7th Kup - Yellow belt with green tag
- 6th Kup - Green belt (green signifies the plant's growth as skills are developed)
- 5th Kup - Green belt with blue tag
- 4th Kup - Blue belt (blue signifies heaven, towards which the plant is growing as training progresses)
- 3rd Kup - Blue belt with red tag
- 2nd Kup - Red belt (red signifies danger, cautioning the student to exercise control and warning opponents)
- 1st Kup - Red belt with black tag
- 1st Dan - Black belt (black is opposite to white and signifies maturity and proficiency in taekwondo)

== See also ==
- 2025 European Poomsae Championships
