= Tavakkul Bayramov =

Azerbaijani taekwondo practitioner

Medal record

Men's Taekwondo

Representing Azerbaijan

World Championships
| Bronze medal – third place | 2003 Garmisch | Middleweight |
| Silver medal – second place | 2007 Beijing | Middleweight |

European Championships
| Bronze medal – third place | 2004 Lillehammer | Middleweight |
| Bronze medal – third place | 2006 Bonn | Middleweight |
| Gold medal – first place | 2010 St. Petersburg | Heavyweight |

Tavakkul Bayramov (Azerbaijani: Təvəkkül Bayramov, born June 27, 1981, in Baku, Azerbaijani SSR) is an Azerbaijani taekwondo athlete.
