= European Universities Taekwondo Championships =

Taekwondo competition

European Universities Taekwondo Championships were the first organised in 2009 and are organised every two years.

The European Universities Taekwondo Championships are coordinated by the European University Sports Association along with the 18 other sports on the program of the European universities championships.

== Summary ==
Edition	Year	Date	Location	Number of			Champions	Ref
Edition	Year	Date	Location	Countries	Universities	Athletes	Champions	Ref
1	2009	December 10–12	Braga, Portugal	6	31	101	(Spain) Polytechnic University of Madrid	
2	2011	December 13–15	Braga, Portugal	16	40		(Russia) Russian State University of Physical Education, Sport, Youth and Tourism	
3	2013	November 22–24	Moscow, Russia	13	48	130	(Russia) Russian State University of Physical Education, Sport, Youth and Tourism	
4	2015	November 10–13	Opatija, Croatia	16	48	150	(Portugal) University of Minho	
5	2017	July 25–30	Coimbra, Portugal	14	83	157	(Portugal) University of Minho	
6	2019	August 1–3	Zagreb, Croatia	18	119		National University of Ukraine on Physical Education and Sport	

== See also ==
- European Taekwondo Championships
- European Taekwondo Championships Olympic Weight Categories
- European Juniors Taekwondo Championships
