= Jon García (taekwondo) =

Spanish taekwondo practitioner

Personal information
- Born: 28 September 1977 (age 48)
Medal record
Men's Taekwondo
Representing Spain
World Championships
Silver medal – second place	2005 Madrid	Middleweight
Bronze medal – third place	2001 Jeju	Middleweight
Bronze medal – third place	2011 Gyeongju	Middleweight
European Championships
Gold medal – first place	2005 Riga	Middleweight
Gold medal – first place	2006 Bonn	Middleweight

Jon García Aguado (born 28 September 1977 in Durango, Vizcaya, Spain) is a Spanish taekwondo athlete.
