= Jacob Martins Obiorah =

Nigerian taekwondo practitioner

Jacob Martins Obiorah is a Nigerian competitive martial artist who competed in national and international events in taekwondo. He achieved Silver at the 8th All Africa Games, and competed in the Athens 2004 Olympic Games, and Taekwondo World Championships in 2005. He won gold medal and best player trophies at both the Belgian and Austrian Opens in 2005 (European Taekwondo Union- class A Tournaments). Martins was also the British National middle weight champion 2005 (undefeated) and British University Welter weight Champion (BUSA 2005) representing London South Bank University.
