= Yousef Karami =

Iranian taekwondo practitioner

- Karami (right) winning the bronze at the 2004 Olympics

Personal information
- Nationality: Iranian
- Born: March 22, 1983 (age 43) Meyaneh, Iran

Sport
- Country: Iran
- Sport: Taekwondo

Yousef Karami
Medal record

Men's taekwondo

Representing Iran

Olympic Games
Bronze medal – third place	2004 Athens	80 kg

World Championships
Gold medal – first place	2003 Garmisch-Partenkirchen	84 kg
Gold medal – first place	2011 Gyeongju	87 kg
Bronze medal – third place	2005 Madrid	84 kg
Bronze medal – third place	2009 Copenhagen	87 kg

Asian Games
Gold medal – first place	2006 Doha	84 kg
Gold medal – first place	2010 Guangzhou	87 kg

Asian Championships
Gold medal – first place	2002 Amman	72 kg
Silver medal – second place	2010 Astana	87 kg
Silver medal – second place	2014 Tashkent	87 kg

Universiade
Gold medal – first place	2007 Bangkok	84 kg

Yousef Karami (Persian: یوسف کرمی; born March 22, 1983, in Meyaneh, Iran) is an Iranian former taekwondo athlete who competed in the Men's 80 kg at the 2004 Summer Olympics and won the bronze medal. He is also the 2003 world champion (in 78–84 kg). Karami also won gold in the 2006 Asian Games in 84 kg and in the 2010 Asian Games in 87 kg.

He was appointed as the Taekwondo head coach of Pakistan in the summer of 2022.
