= Bahri Tanrıkulu =

Turkish taekwondo practitioner (born 1980)

Personal information
- Nationality: Turkish
- Born: March 16, 1980 (age 46) Ankara, Turkey
- Height: 1.85 m (6 ft 1 in)
- Weight: 85 kg (187 lb; 13.4 st)

Sport
- Country: Turkey
- Sport: Taekwondo
- Event: Middleweight
- Club: Kocaeli Büyükşehir Belediyesi Kağıt Spor Kulübü
Medal record
Representing Turkey
Olympic Games
Silver medal – second place	2004 Athens	80 kg
World Championships
Gold medal – first place	2001 Jeju	Middleweight
Gold medal – first place	2007 Beijing	Middleweight
Gold medal – first place	2009 Copenhagen	Middleweight
Silver medal – second place	1999 Edmonton	Welterweight
Bronze medal – third place	2003 Garmisch	Middleweight
European Championships
Gold medal – first place	2000 Patras	Heavyweight
Gold medal – first place	2002 Samsun	Middleweight
Silver medal – second place	2005 Riga	Middleweight
Silver medal – second place	2006 Bonn	Middleweight
Silver medal – second place	2008 Rome	Middleweight
Bronze medal – third place	1998 Eindhoven	Featherweight
Bronze medal – third place	2004 Lillehammer	Middleweight
Universiade
Gold medal – first place	2005 Izmir	Middleweight
Representing Palestine
Asian Championships
Bronze medal – third place	2016 Pasay	Heavyweight

Bahri Tanrıkulu (born March 16, 1980, in Ankara, Turkey) is a Kurdish taekwondo practitioner, who competed in the Men's 80 kg division at the 2004 Summer Olympics held in Athens, Greece and won the silver medal. He studied at Akdeniz University.

He is Turkey's first World and European Taekwondo champion. He was a member of Istanbul Metropolitan Municipality Sports Club before he transferred to Kocaeli Büyükşehir Belediyesi Kağıt Spor Kulübü. The 1.86 m (6.1 ft) tall athlete is student of physical education and sports at Akdeniz University.

He qualified for participation at the 2012 Summer Olympics where he reached the semi-final.

== Personal life ==
Bahri is the eldest of four siblings in a family originating from Diyarbakır. His brothers Tunç and Çağrı, as well as his sister Azize perform taekwondo. While Tunç retired from active sports, Azize and Çağrı are still competing. Azize Tanrıkulu took also part at the Beijing Olympics winning the silver medal.

Bahri Tanrıkulu married Tina Morgan (born 1982), an Australian taekwondo athlete on January 29, 2009, in Perth, Australia.

== Achievements ==
- 1998 12th European Taekwondo Championships in Eindhoven, Netherlands - Bronze (Featherweight)
- 1998 1st Spanish Open Taekwondo Championships in Barcelona - Silver (juniors), Bronze (seniors)
- 1999 14th World Seniors Taekwondo Championships in Edmonton, Alberta, Canada - Silver
- 2000 13th European Seniors Taekwondo Championships in Patras, Greece - Gold (Heavyweight male)
- 2000 Korean Chuncheon International Open Taekwondo Championships - Gold
- 2001 15th World Taekwondo Championships in Jeju, South Korea - Gold
- 2002 14th European Taekwondo Championships in Samsun, Turkey - Gold (Middleweight)
- 2002 Taekwondo World Cup in Tokyo, Japan - Silver
- 2004 Summer Olympics in Athens, Greece - Silver (80 kg)
- 2005 23rd World Universiade in İzmir, Turkey - Gold
- 2006 European Seniors Taekwondo Championships in Bonn, Germany - Silver (- 84 kg)
- 2007 Beijing - Bahri Tanrikulu of Turkey became the world champion in men's 84 kg category at the World Taekwondo Championships in Beijing. Tanrikulu defeated his Azerbaijani opponent Tavakgul Bayramov 4-0 and won gold medal. Bahri Tanrikulu beat Volodymyr Krasitsky of Ukraine in the first round, Rajabov Shokirjont of Tajikistan in the second round, Yossef Karami of Iran in the third round, Wu Ming-chieh of Taiwan in the quarter-final, and Park Min-Soo of South Korea in the semi-final.
- 2008 European Seniors Taekwondo Championships in Rome - Silver
- 2009 Taekwondo World Championships in Copenhagen - Gold
