= European Taekwondo Championships =

Taekwondo competition

- Current event or competition: 2024 European Taekwondo Championships

Competition details
- Discipline: Taekwondo
- Type: kyourugui, biennial
- Organiser: European Taekwondo Union (ETU)

Divisions
- Current weight divisions: Men (8); Women (8)

History
- First edition: 22 May 1976 in Barcelona, Spain
- Editions: 26 (2024)

The European Taekwondo Championships are the European senior championships in Taekwondo, first held in Barcelona in 1976. The event is held every two years and is organized by the European Taekwondo Union, the continental affiliate of World Taekwondo, which organises and controls Olympic style taekwondo. An additional event, the G4 Extra European Taekwondo Championships were exceptionally held in 2019.

The championships should not be confused with:

- the European Games taekwondo competitions, which form part of a continental multi-sport event in the Olympic tradition;
- the EITF European Taekwondo Championships, a championships organised by the European International Taekwondo Federation, the continental arm of the International Taekwondo Federation.
- the European Taekwondo Championships Olympic Weight Categories, also organised by the ETU but only a G-1 ranked tournament while the European Taekwondo Championships are ranked as a G-4 tournament and also the most important continental competition.

In addition to the kyorugi (full contact fighting) Championships, there are also Para European Championships as well as Poomsae and Para Poomsae Championships held every two years.

== Editions ==
#	Year	Dates	Host	Champion	Events
1	1976	22 May	Barcelona, Spain	Netherlands	8
2	1978	20–22 October	Munich, West Germany	West Germany	8
3	1980	14–17 October	Esbjerg, Denmark	West Germany	17
4	1982	23–26 September	Rome, Italy	West Germany	18
5	1984	26–28 October	Stuttgart, West Germany	West Germany	18
6	1986	3–5 October	Seefeld, Austria	Netherlands	16
7	1988	26–29 May	Ankara, Turkey	Turkey	16
8	1990	18–21 October	Aarhus, Denmark	Turkey	16
9	1992	18–25 May	Valencia, Spain	Spain	16
10	1994	28–30 October	Zagreb, Croatia	Spain	16
11	1996	26–27 October	Helsinki, Finland	Spain	16
12	1998	23–25 October	Eindhoven, Netherlands	Spain	16
13	2000	4–7 May	Patras, Greece	Turkey	16
14	2002	1–5 April	Samsun, Turkey	Turkey	16
15	2004	1–5 May	Lillehammer, Norway	Spain	16
16	2005	6–9 October	Riga, Latvia	Turkey	16
17	2006	26–28 May	Bonn, Germany	Spain	16
18	2008	10–13 April	Rome, Italy	Turkey	16
19	2010	12–15 May	St. Petersburg, Russia	Turkey	16
20	2012	3–6 May	Manchester, United Kingdom	France	16
21	2014	1–4 May	Baku, Azerbaijan	Croatia	16
22	2016	19–22 May	Montreux, Switzerland	Great Britain	16
23	2018	10–13 May	Kazan, Russia	Russia	16
24	2021	8–11 April	Sofia, Bulgaria	Russia	16
25	2022	19–22 May	Manchester, United Kingdom	Turkey	16
26	2024	10–12 May	Belgrade, Serbia	Croatia	16
27	2026	12–14 May	Munich, Germany	Turkey	16

- 2020 European Taekwondo Championships was cancelled due to COVID-19 pandemic ( Belgrade, Serbia).

== Extra European Championships ==
The G4 Extra European Taekwondo Championships were held in November 2019 as a form of compensation for European athletes to provide them the chance to collect ranking points for the 2020 Olympic Games after taekwondo was dropped from the 2019 European Games program. World Taekwondo Europe (WTE) president referred to it as the continental flagship event.

Edition	Year	Date	City and host country	Overall champion	Events
1	2019	1–3 November	Bari, Italy	Great Britain	10

== U21 ==
Source:

== Team ranking ==
Team Points Rules:

1976–2018: Each Registered (weight-in) player 1 Point + Each win 1 Point + Gold medal 7 point + silver medal 3 point + bronze medal 1 point

2021–present: Each Registered (weight-in) player 1 Point + Each win 1 Point + Gold medal 120 point + silver medal 50 point + bronze medal 20 point

If the points are equal, the medals will choose the best team.

Year	Host	Men			Women		
Year	Host	1	2	3	1	2	3
1976	Spain	Spain	West Germany	Turkey	—N/a	—N/a	—N/a
1978	West Germany	West Germany	Netherlands	Spain	—N/a	—N/a	—N/a
1980	Denmark	Italy	Denmark	Great Britain	Italy	Germany	Netherlands
1982	Italy	Germany	Spain	Italy	Spain	Turkey	Italy
1984	West Germany	Germany	Turkey	Italy	Spain	Germany	Netherlands
1986	Austria	Turkey	Germany	Denmark	Germany	Turkey	Spain
1988	Turkey	Turkey	Spain	Germany	Turkey	Spain	Netherlands
1990	Denmark	Denmark	Turkey	Germany	Turkey	Spain	Italy
1992	Spain	Spain	Denmark	Turkey	Spain	Turkey	Germany
1994	Croatia	Spain	Denmark	Italy	Spain	Greece	Great Britain
1996	Finland	Spain	France	Turkey	Spain	Netherlands	Germany
1998	Netherlands	Turkey	Spain	France	Russia	Spain	Denmark
2000	Greece	Spain	Turkey	Germany	Russia	Spain	Turkey
2002	Turkey	Turkey	Spain	Azerbaijan	Turkey	Spain	Russia
2004	Norway	Spain	France	Azerbaijan	Spain	Turkey	France
2005	Latvia	Turkey	France	Azerbaijan	Spain	Russia	Turkey
2006	Germany	Netherlands	Azerbaijan	Russia	Spain	Turkey	Germany
2008	Italy	Turkey	Greece	Germany	Germany	Turkey	Spain
2010	Russia	Turkey	Russia	Germany	France	Spain	Great Britain
2012	Great Britain	Great Britain	Russia	Turkey	France	Turkey	Croatia
2014	Azerbaijan	Russia	Azerbaijan	Turkey	Croatia	France	Russia
2016	Switzerland	Belgium	Portugal	Russia	Great Britain	Turkey	Serbia
2018	Russia	Russia	Croatia	Spain	Turkey	Great Britain	Russia
2021	Bulgaria	Russia	Spain	Belarus	Great Britain	Croatia	Russia
2022	Great Britain	Turkey	Spain	France	Turkey	France	Spain

== Medals (1976–2026) ==
Rank	Nation	Gold	Silver	Bronze	Total
1	Turkey	67	71	63	201
2	Spain	66	60	84	210
3	Germany	50	34	80	164
4	Russia	29	22	43	94
5	France	27	30	62	119
6	Great Britain	27	17	42	86
7	Netherlands	26	28	48	102
8	Croatia	24	15	44	83
9	Italy	23	24	65	112
10	Denmark	18	19	33	70
11	Greece	10	13	34	57
12	Azerbaijan	8	13	21	42
13	Belgium	7	2	16	25
14	Belarus	7	1	15	23
15	Hungary	5	3	8	16
16	Sweden	4	10	28	42
17	Serbia	4	10	16	30
18	Austria	3	7	17	27
19	Poland	3	5	19	27
20	Portugal	3	0	6	9
21	Ukraine	2	9	14	25
22	Norway	1	3	9	13
23	Israel	1	3	8	12
24	Switzerland	1	3	3	7
25	Moldova	1	1	4	6
26	Bulgaria	1	1	3	5
–	Individual Neutral Athletes	1	1	2	4
27	Armenia	1	1	1	3
28	Isle of Man	1	0	0	1
29	Bosnia and Herzegovina	0	4	2	6
30	Slovenia	0	3	5	8
31	Finland	0	2	21	23
32	Georgia	0	2	0	2
33	Czech Republic	0	1	3	4
34	Latvia	0	1	2	3
35	Ireland	0	1	1	2
35	Romania	0	1	1	2
37	Cyprus	0	0	4	4
38	Montenegro	0	0	1	1
38	North Macedonia	0	0	1	1
38	Refugee Team	0	0	1	1
Totals (40 entries)		421	421	830	1,672

== Multiple gold medalists ==
The table shows those who have won at least three gold medals.

Men

Athlete	Country	Gold medal	Silver medal	Bronze medal	Total
Geremia Di Costanzo	Italy	5	0	1	6
Servet Tazegül	Turkey	5	0	0	5
Seyfula Magomedov	Russia	4	1	2	7
Pascal Gentil	France	3	3	0	6
Aaron Cook	Great Britain Isle of Man Moldova	3	1	1	5
Gabriel Esparza	Spain	3	1	0	4
Levent Tuncat	Germany	3	1	0	4
Joseph Salim	Denmark	3	0	3	6
Gergely Salim	Denmark	3	0	0	3
Jesper Roesen	Denmark	3	0	0	3

Women

Athlete	Country	Gold medal	Silver medal	Bronze medal	Total
Coral Bistuer	Spain	5	0	0	5
Bianca Walkden	Great Britain	4	1	1	6
Brigitte Yagüe	Spain	4	1	1	6
Sarah Stevenson	Great Britain	4	0	2	6
Gwladys Épangue	France	3	3	1	7
Jade Jones	Great Britain	3	1	3	7
Nataša Vezmar	Croatia	3	1	1	5
Lucija Zaninović	Croatia	3	0	1	4
Anastasia Baryshnikova	Russia	3	0	0	3
Natalia Ivanova	Russia	3	0	0	3
Tatiana Kudashova	Russia	3	0	0	3

== European Poomsae Championships ==
Edition	Year	Host country
6	2005 (details)	Finland, Turku
7	2007 (details)	Turkey, Antalya
8	2009 (details)	Portugal, Portimão
9	2010 (details)	Uzbekistan, Tashkent
10	2011 (details)	Italy, Genoa
11	2013 (details)	Spain, La Nucia
12	2015 (details)	Serbia, Belgrade
13	2017 (details)	Greece, Rhodes
14	2019 (details)	Turkey, Antalya
15	2021 (details)	Portugal, Seixal
16	2023 (details)	Austria, Innsbruck
17	2025 (details)	Estonia, Tallinn

== See also ==
- Taekwondo at the European Games
- Taekwondo at the 2015 European Games
- Taekwondo at the 2023 European Games
- European Taekwondo Championships Olympic Weight Categories
- European Junior Taekwondo Championships
- European Universities Taekwondo Championships
- 2023 European Poomsae Championships
- 2025 European Poomsae Championships
