= Taekwondo at the 2016 Summer Olympics – Qualification =

Taekwondo competition

This article details the qualifying phase for taekwondo at the 2016 Summer Olympics. The competition at these Games comprised a total of 128 taekwondo fighters coming from their respective NOCs. Each NOC was allowed to enter up to a maximum of eight competitors, four of each gender, based on the WTF Olympic rankings, such that an athlete per NOC must be among the top six in each weight category.

Four places had been reserved to the host nation Brazil, and another four had been invited by the Tripartite Commission. The remaining 120 places were allocated through a qualification process in which athletes had won quota place for their respective NOC.

== Timeline ==
Event	Date	Venue
WTF Olympic Rankings	December 11–17, 2015	—
European Qualification Tournament	January 16–17, 2016	Istanbul, Turkey
African Qualification Tournament	February 6–7, 2016	Agadir, Morocco
Oceania Qualification Tournament	February 27, 2016	Port Moresby, Papua New Guinea
Pan American Qualification Tournament	March 10−11, 2016	Aguascalientes, Mexico
Asian Qualification Tournament	April 16−17, 2016	Pasay, Philippines

== Qualification summary ==
NOC	Men				Women				Total
NOC	−58 kg	−68 kg	−80 kg	+80 kg	−49 kg	−57 kg	−67 kg	+67 kg	Total
Aruba					X				1
Australia	X		X			X	X		4
Azerbaijan			X	X	X		X		4
Belarus				X					1
Belgium	X	X				X			3
Brazil	X			X	X	X			4
Cambodia								X	1
Canada							X		1
Cape Verde					X				1
Central African Republic		X							1
Chile		X							1
China	X			X	X			X	4
Chinese Taipei			X		X		X		3
Colombia	X					X			2
Croatia		X			X	X			3
Cuba				X					1
Democratic Republic of the Congo					X				1
Dominican Republic	X		X					X	3
Egypt		X				X	X		3
Finland						X			1
France				X	X		X	X	4
Gabon				X					1
Germany	X		X				X		3
Great Britain			X	X		X		X	4
Haiti							X		1
Honduras			X						1
Iran	X		X	X		X			4
Israel	X								1
Ivory Coast			X				X	X	3
Japan						X			1
Jordan		X							1
Kazakhstan				X	X		X		3
Libya	X								1
Mali			X						1
Mexico	X	X			X			X	4
Moldova			X						1
Mongolia		X							1
Morocco	X					X		X	3
Nepal								X	1
Netherlands								X	1
New Zealand					X				1
Niger				X					1
Norway								X	1
Panama						X			1
Papua New Guinea		X						X	2
Peru					X				1
Philippines								X	1
Poland		X	X						2
Portugal	X								1
Puerto Rico								X	1
Russia		X	X				X		3
Senegal		X							1
Serbia					X			X	2
South Korea	X	X		X	X		X		5
Spain	X	X				X			3
Sweden						X	X		2
Thailand	X				X	X			3
Tonga				X					1
Tunisia			X	X		X			3
Turkey		X					X		2
United States			X	X			X	X	4
Uzbekistan			X	X			X		3
Venezuela		X							1
Total: 63 NOCs	16	16	16	16	16	16	16	16	128

== Men's events ==
=== −58 kg ===
Competition	Places	Qualified athletes
WTF Olympic Rankings (as of December 2015)	6	Kim Tae-hun (KOR); Farzan Ashourzadeh (IRI); Rui Bragança (POR); Levent Tuncat (GER); César Rodríguez (MEX); Si Mohamed Ketbi (BEL)
European Qualification Tournament	2	Ron Atias (ISR); Jesús Tortosa (ESP)
African Qualification Tournament	2	Omar Hajjami (MAR); Yousef Shriha (LBA)
Oceania Qualification Tournament	1	Safwan Khalil (AUS)
Pan American Qualification Tournament	2	Luisito Pié (DOM); Óscar Muñoz (COL)
Asian Qualification Tournament	2	Zhao Shuai (CHN); Tawin Hanprab (THA)
Host nation / Universality places	1	Venilton Teixeira (BRA)
Total	16	

=== −68 kg ===
Competition	Places	Qualified athletes
WTF Olympic Rankings (as of December 2015)	6	Lee Dae-hoon (KOR); Aleksey Denisenko (RUS); Jaouad Achab (BEL); Saúl Gutiérrez (MEX); Servet Tazegül (TUR); Joel González (ESP)
European Qualification Tournament	2	Karol Robak (POL); Filip Grgić (CRO)
African Qualification Tournament	2	Ghofran Zaki (EGY); Balla Dièye (SEN)
Oceania Qualification Tournament	1	Maxemillion Kassman (PNG)
Pan American Qualification Tournament	2	Edgar Contreras (VEN); Ignacio Morales (CHI)
Asian Qualification Tournament	2	Ahmad Abughaush (JOR); Pürevjavyn Temüüjin (MGL)
Host nation / Universality places	1	David Boui (CAF)
Total	16	

=== −80 kg ===
Competition	Places	Qualified athletes
WTF Olympic Rankings (as of December 2015)	6	Mehdi Khodabakhshi (IRI); Aaron Cook (MDA); Lutalo Muhammad (GBR); Albert Gaun (RUS); Tahir Güleç (GER); Cheick Sallah Cissé (CIV)
European Qualification Tournament	2	Milad Beigi (AZE); Piotr Paziński (POL)
African Qualification Tournament	2	Oussama Oueslati (TUN); Ismaël Coulibaly (MLI)
Oceania Qualification Tournament	1	Hayder Shkara (AUS)
Pan American Qualification Tournament	2	Steven López (USA); Moisés Hernández (DOM)
Asian Qualification Tournament	2	Nikita Rafalovich (UZB); Liu Wei-ting (TPE)
Host nation / Universality places	1	Miguel Ferrera (HON)
Total	16	

=== +80 kg ===
Competition	Places	Qualified athletes
WTF Olympic Rankings (as of December 2015)	6	Dmitriy Shokin (UZB); Radik Isayev (AZE); Sajjad Mardani (IRI); Anthony Obame (GAB); M'Bar N'Diaye (FRA); Cha Dong-min (KOR)
European Qualification Tournament	2	Mahama Cho (GBR); Arman-Marshall Silla (BLR)
African Qualification Tournament	2	Yassine Trabelsi (TUN); Abdoul Razak Issoufou (NIG)
Oceania Qualification Tournament	1	Pita Taufatofua (TGA)
Pan American Qualification Tournament	2	Rafael Alba (CUB); Stephen Lambdin (USA)
Asian Qualification Tournament	2	Qiao Sen (CHN); Ruslan Zhaparov (KAZ)
Host nation / Universality places	1	Maicon Andrade (BRA)
Total	16	

== Women's events ==
=== −49 kg ===
Competition	Places	Qualified athletes
WTF Olympic Rankings (as of December 2015)	6	Wu Jingyu (CHN); Lucija Zaninović (CRO); Yasmina Aziez (FRA); Panipak Wongpattanakit (THA); Kim So-hui (KOR); Itzel Manjarrez (MEX)
European Qualification Tournament	2	Patimat Abakarova (AZE); Tijana Bogdanović (SRB)
African Qualification Tournament	2	Rosa Keleku (COD); Maria Andrade (CPV)
Oceania Qualification Tournament	1	Andrea Kilday (NZL)
Pan American Qualification Tournament	2	Julissa Diez Canseco (PER); Monica Pimentel (ARU)
Asian Qualification Tournament	2	Huang Huai-hsuan (TPE); Ainur Yesbergenova (KAZ)
Host nation / Universality places	1	Iris Sing (BRA)
Total	16	

=== −57 kg ===
Competition	Places	Qualified athletes
WTF Olympic Rankings (as of December 2015)	6	Jade Jones (GBR); Eva Calvo (ESP); Hedaya Malak (EGY); Mayu Hamada (JPN); Ana Zaninović (CRO); Nikita Glasnović (SWE)
European Qualification Tournament	2	Raheleh Asemani (BEL) (Note: Raheleh Asemani won the quota as a member of Refugee Olympic Team, but later granted Belgian citizenship and applied to compete instead for the Belgian team.); Suvi Mikkonen (FIN)
African Qualification Tournament	2	Hakima El-Meslahy (MAR); Rahma Ben Ali (TUN)
Oceania Qualification Tournament	1	Caroline Marton (AUS)
Pan American Qualification Tournament	2	Carolena Carstens (PAN); Doris Patiño (COL)
Asian Qualification Tournament	2	Kimia Alizadeh (IRI); Phannapa Harnsujin (THA)
Host nation / Universality places	1	Júlia Vasconcelos (BRA)
Total	16	

=== −67 kg ===
Competition	Places	Qualified athletes
WTF Olympic Rankings (as of December 2015)	6	Haby Niaré (FRA); Elin Johansson (SWE); Chuang Chia-chia (TPE); Oh Hye-ri (KOR); Anastasia Baryshnikova (RUS); Nur Tatar (TUR)
European Qualification Tournament	2	Farida Azizova (AZE); Rabia Gülec (GER)
African Qualification Tournament	2	Ruth Gbagbi (CIV); Seham El-Sawalhy (EGY)
Oceania Qualification Tournament	1	Carmen Marton (AUS)
Pan American Qualification Tournament	2	Paige McPherson (USA); Melissa Pagnotta (CAN)
Asian Qualification Tournament	2	Cansel Deniz (KAZ); Nigora Tursunkulova (UZB)
Host nation / Universality places	1	Aniya Louissaint (HAI)
Total	16	

=== +67 kg ===
Competition	Places	Qualified athletes
WTF Olympic Rankings (as of December 2015)	6	Zheng Shuyin (CHN); Milica Mandić (SRB); Bianca Walkden (GBR); Jackie Galloway (USA); Gwladys Épangue (FRA); María Espinoza (MEX)
European Qualification Tournament	2	Tina Røe Skaar (NOR); Reshmie Oogink (NED)
African Qualification Tournament	2	Mamina Koné (CIV); Wiam Dislam (MAR)
Oceania Qualification Tournament	1	Samantha Kassman (PNG)
Pan American Qualification Tournament	2	Katherine Rodríguez (DOM); Crystal Weekes (PUR)
Asian Qualification Tournament	2	Sorn Seavmey (CAM); Kirstie Alora (PHI)
Host nation / Universality places	1	Nisha Rawal (NEP)
Total	16	
