= 2015 World Taekwondo Championships – Men's lightweight =

Taekwondo competition

Men's lightweight at the 2015 World Championships
- Venue: Traktor Ice Arena
- Dates: 13–14 May 2015
- Competitors: 68 from 68 nations

Medalists
gold medal	Masoud Hajji-Zavareh	Iran
silver medal	Nikita Rafalovich	Uzbekistan
bronze medal	Albert Gaun	Russia
bronze medal	Ismaël Coulibaly	Mali

The men's lightweight is a competition featured at the 2015 World Taekwondo Championships, and was held at the Traktor Ice Arena in Chelyabinsk, Russia on May 13 and May 14.

Lightweights were limited to a maximum of 74 kilograms in body mass.

== Results ==
Legend

- DQ — Won by disqualification

=== Finals ===
Quarterfinals		Semifinals		Final
Uriel Adriano (MEX)	4
Masoud Hajji-Zavareh (IRI)	14	Masoud Hajji-Zavareh (IRI)	6
Arnold Nkoy (COD)	7	Albert Gaun (RUS)	5
Albert Gaun (RUS)	13			Masoud Hajji-Zavareh (IRI)	9
Nikita Rafalovich (UZB)	4			Nikita Rafalovich (UZB)	7
Kim Hun (KOR)	3	Nikita Rafalovich (UZB)	4
Ismaël Coulibaly (MLI)	9	Ismaël Coulibaly (MLI)	3
Júlio Ferreira (POR)	5

=== Top half ===
==== Section 1 ====
Round of 128
~~Khir Amir Salam (MAS)~~
Majed Al-Mabruk (KSA)	DQ

Round of 64
Uriel Adriano (MEX)	10
Majed Al-Mabruk (KSA)	2
Balša Radunović (MNE)	11
Neyder Lozano (COL)	6
Jack Marton (AUS)	6
Uladzislau Statkevich (BLR)	3
Mario Becerra (CHI)	2
Seif Eissa (EGY)	3

Round of 32
Uriel Adriano (MEX)	13
Balša Radunović (MNE)	10
Jack Marton (AUS)	3
Seif Eissa (EGY)	7

Round of 16
Uriel Adriano (MEX)	4
Seif Eissa (EGY)	3

==== Section 2 ====
Round of 128

Round of 64
Raúl Martínez (ESP)	10
Hồng Minh Cao (VIE)	2
Imants Kopjevs (LAT)	7
Karol Hołubowicz (POL)	16
Toni Kanaet (CRO)	16
Ahmed Sama (GHA)	3
Zakaria Chenouf (ALG)	0
Masoud Hajji-Zavareh (IRI)	13

Round of 32
Raúl Martínez (ESP)	9
Karol Hołubowicz (POL)	2
Toni Kanaet (CRO)	7
Masoud Hajji-Zavareh (IRI)	16

Round of 16
Raúl Martínez (ESP)	4
Masoud Hajji-Zavareh (IRI)	7

==== Section 3 ====
Round of 128
Georgios Roditis (GRE)	8
Alon Elboher (ISR)	4

Round of 64
Saifeddine Trabelsi (TUN)	9
Georgios Roditis (GRE)	10
Arnold Nkoy (COD)	8
John Asp (NOR)	4
~~Anas Al-Adarbi (JOR)~~
David Sajko (SVK)	DQ
Faical Saidi (MAR)	3
Damir Fejzić (SRB)	10

Round of 32
Georgios Roditis (GRE)	8
Arnold Nkoy (COD)	10
David Sajko (SVK)	0
Damir Fejzić (SRB)	4

Round of 16
Arnold Nkoy (COD)	14
Damir Fejzić (SRB)	10

==== Section 4 ====
Round of 128
~~Jerome Browne (TTO)~~	DQ
~~Namoa Sitapa (TGA)~~	DQ

Round of 64
Andrew Deer (GBR)	12
Javier Medina (VEN)	7
Kristmundur Gíslason (ISL)	6
Samuel Morrison (PHI)	8
Artem Marchenko (UKR)	13
Zabihullah Dawrooghbik (AFG)	15
Bye
Albert Gaun (RUS)

Round of 32
Andrew Deer (GBR)	14
Samuel Morrison (PHI)	16
Zabihullah Dawrooghbik (AFG)	1
Albert Gaun (RUS)	5

Round of 16
Samuel Morrison (PHI)	11
Albert Gaun (RUS)	19

=== Bottom half ===
==== Section 5 ====
Round of 128
Hermen Doupassou (GAB)	8
Yeung Tsz Wing (HKG)	7

Round of 64
Nikita Rafalovich (UZB)	14
Hermen Doupassou (GAB)	0
Remuela Tinirau (FPO)	7
Musbah Rajab (LBA)	6
~~Wilkin Heredia (DOM)~~
Ýusup Annaýew (TKM)	DQ
Berkay Akyol (TUR)	5
Peerathep Sila-on (THA)	6

Round of 32
Nikita Rafalovich (UZB)	3
Remuela Tinirau (FPO)	2
Ýusup Annaýew (TKM)	1
Peerathep Sila-on (THA)	13

Round of 16
Nikita Rafalovich (UZB)	16
Peerathep Sila-on (THA)	11

==== Section 6 ====
Round of 128
Gianluca Barbara (MLT)	4
Rostand Kiki (BEN)	16

Round of 64
Ilkin Shahbazov (AZE)	2
Christos Pilavakis (CYP)	3
~~Mostafa Mohamed (SUD)~~
Kim Hun (KOR)	DQ
Gorome Karé (SEN)	DQ
~~Angelo Emacin (HAI)~~
Rostand Kiki (BEN)	8
Henrique Precioso (BRA)	6

Round of 32
Christos Pilavakis (CYP)	1
Kim Hun (KOR)	11
Gorome Karé (SEN)	11
Rostand Kiki (BEN)	10

Round of 16
Kim Hun (KOR)	8
Gorome Karé (SEN)	3

==== Section 7 ====
Round of 128

Round of 64
Torann Maizeroi (FRA)	3
Hsu Wei-hsiang (TPE)	3
~~Haron Mukada (KEN)~~
José Cobas (CUB)	DQ
Ismaël Coulibaly (MLI)	10
Mohammed Hamooda (QAT)	2
William Rampeba (BOT)	1
Teodor Georgiev (BUL)	14

Round of 32
Torann Maizeroi (FRA)	4
José Cobas (CUB)	2
Ismaël Coulibaly (MLI)	5
Teodor Georgiev (BUL)	1

Round of 16
Torann Maizeroi (FRA)	4
Ismaël Coulibaly (MLI)	5

==== Section 8 ====
Round of 128
Viktor Jankovský (CZE)	10
Guillermo Rodas (GUA)	9

Round of 64
Anicet Kassi (CIV)	4
Liu Funing (CHN)	6
Francesco Maiani (SMR)	2
Timothy Curry (USA)	16
Yerzhan Abylkas (KAZ)	14
Khalid Hassan (CAN)	8
Viktor Jankovský (CZE)	0
Júlio Ferreira (POR)	5

Round of 32
Liu Funing (CHN)	9
Timothy Curry (USA)	9
Yerzhan Abylkas (KAZ)	3
Júlio Ferreira (POR)	11

Round of 16
Timothy Curry (USA)	8
Júlio Ferreira (POR)	12
