= Ismaël Coulibaly =

Malian taekwondo practitioner

Personal information
- Nationality: Malian
- Born: November 20, 1992 (age 33)
- Height: 1.91 m (6 ft 3 in)
- Weight: 78 kg (172 lb)

Sport
- Sport: Taekwondo
- Weight class: Lightweight
Medal record
Taekwondo
Representing Mali
World Championships
Bronze medal – third place	2011 Gyeongju	Lightweight
Bronze medal – third place	2015 Chelyabinsk	Lightweight
African Games
Gold medal – first place	2015 Brazzaville	−74 kg
Bronze medal – third place	2011 Maputo	−74 kg
Bronze medal – third place	2023 Accra	−80 kg
World Taekwondo Grand Prix
Bronze medal – third place	2015 Moscow	80 kg
African Taekwondo Olympic Qualification Tournament
Silver medal – second place	2016 Agadir	−80 kg
- Updated on 27 October 2016

Ismaël Coulibaly (born 20 November 1992) is a Malian taekwondo practitioner who mainly fights in the lightweight division. Coulibaly represented Mali at the 2016 Summer Olympics in Rio de Janeiro, where he competed in the men's 80kg competition. He was Mali's flag bearer for the closing ceremony of the 2016 Olympics. He has also competed in three World Taekwondo Championships, a World Taekwondo Grand Prix and two African Games. He has won multiple World Championship medals and multiple medals in African regional competitions.

== Competition ==
Coulibaly's debut at an international sporting competition was at the 2011 World Taekwondo Championships where he competed in the lightweight competition. His first fight in the competition was in the round of 64, where he beat Sawatvilay Phimmasone of Laos 7–3. He then beat German Mokdad Ounis 4–3 and Mexican Uriel Adriano 15–7 to progress through to the quarterfinals. In his quarterfinal, Coulibaly faced Austrian Manuel Mark and won 9–7. In the semi-final of the competition, Coulibaly fought Alireza Nasr Azadani of Iran. Azadani won the fight nine seven. Therefore, Coulibaly, along with the other loser in the semi-finals, Turk Rıdvan Baygut, was awarded a bronze medal. He was Mali's only medalist at the 2011 World Taekwondo Championships. At the 2011 All-Africa Games, Coulibaly won a bronze medal in the −74 kg competition.

Coulibaly then competed in the 2013 World Taekwondo Championships where he reached the round of 32 of the lightweight competition, before losing 8–3 to Russian Albert Gaun. Coulibaly's next major competition was the 2015 World Taekwondo Championships where he competed in the lightweight. In the round of 64 he beat Qatari Mohammed Hamooda 10–2. He then won his round of 32 fight 5–1 against Bulgarian Teodor Georgiev before beating Frenchman Torann Maizeroi 5–4 in the round of 16. In the quarterfinals, Coulibaly beat Júlio Ferreira of Portugal 9–5 to progress to the semi-finals. He faced Uzbek Nikita Rafalovich in the semi-final and lost 4–3, and, therefore, won a bronze medal which was Mali's only medal in the championships.

Coulibaly won a bronze medal in the Moscow leg of the 2015 World Taekwondo Grand Prix in the 80 kg competition. Coulibaly won his first international gold medal at the 2015 African Games after beating Egyptian Seif Eissa in the final of the lightweight competition. Coulibaly qualified for the 2016 Summer Olympics by winning a silver medal in the −80 kg competition of the 2016 African Taekwondo Olympic Qualification Tournament. He lost to Oussama Oueslati of Tunisia in the final of the tournament.

=== 2016 Summer Olympics ===
At the 2016 Summer Olympics in Rio de Janeiro, Brazil, Coulibaly competed in the 80kg competition. He was the eighth seed for the competition, out of 16 athletes. Before the competition started he told Africanews that, "“Being young I stopped my studies for this sport, honestly I regretted a lot, but on the other hand, I don’t regret it, because I am one of the best athletes in the world, and for that i don’t have many regrets and i know that my family is proud of me. i am going to continue fighting, I promise to win an Olympic medal and God willing i will do it." For the preliminary round, Coulibaly was drawn against Azerbaijani Milad Beigi. Beigi won the fight 13–6 and, therefore, Coulibaly was knocked out of the competition. Coulibaly was Mali's flag bearer for the closing ceremony of the Olympics.
