= 2013 World Taekwondo Championships – Men's lightweight =

Taekwondo competition

Men's lightweight at the 2013 World Championships
- Venue: Exhibition Center of Puebla
- Dates: 16 July 2013
- Competitors: 70 from 69 nations

Medalists
gold medal	Uriel Adriano	Mexico
silver medal	Albert Gaun	Russia
bronze medal	Kim Yoo-jin	South Korea
bronze medal	Saifeddine Trabelsi	Tunisia

The Men's lightweight is a competition featured at the 2013 World Taekwondo Championships, and was held at the Exhibition Center of Puebla in Puebla, Mexico on July 16. Lightweights were limited to a maximum of 74 kilograms in body mass.

== Results ==
Legend

- DQ — Won by disqualification
- K — Won by knockout
- P — Won by punitive declaration
- W — Won by withdrawal

=== Finals ===
Quarterfinals		Semifinals		Final
Ruebyn Richards (GBR)	0
Uriel Adriano (MEX)	4	Uriel Adriano (MEX)	7
Huang Jiannan (CHN)	9	Kim Yoo-jin (KOR)	2
Kim Yoo-jin (KOR)	10			Uriel Adriano (MEX)	3
Saifeddine Trabelsi (TUN)	11			Albert Gaun (RUS)	2
Gorome Karé (SEN)	7	Saifeddine Trabelsi (TUN)	2
Masoud Hajji-Zavareh (IRI)	1	Albert Gaun (RUS)	7
Albert Gaun (RUS)	5

=== Top half ===
==== Section 1 ====
Round of 128
Ruebyn Richards (GBR)	DQ
~~Roberto Centurión (PAR)~~

Round of 64
Maxime Potvin (CAN)	1
Ruebyn Richards (GBR)	2
Peerathep Sila-on (THA)	18
Fernando García (ARG)	5
Cristian Clementi (ITA)	5
Shota Gochiashvili (GEO)	0
Balša Radunović (MNE)	1
Mokdad Ounis (GER)	5

Round of 32
Ruebyn Richards (GBR)	11
Peerathep Sila-on (THA)	8
Cristian Clementi (ITA)	3
Mokdad Ounis (GER)	8

Round of 16
Ruebyn Richards (GBR)	13
Mokdad Ounis (GER)	5

==== Section 2 ====
Round of 128

Round of 64
Raúl Martínez (ESP)	15
Jerome Browne (TTO)	1
Bartosz Kołecki (POL)	4
Placide Bagabo (NZL)	1
Osvaldo Rodríguez (CHI)	6
A. Naobi Singh (WTF)	7
Raja Zulfadli (SIN)	1
Uriel Adriano (MEX)	6

Round of 32
Raúl Martínez (ESP)	2
Bartosz Kołecki (POL)	1
A. Naobi Singh (WTF)	5
Uriel Adriano (MEX)	17

Round of 16
Raúl Martínez (ESP)	2
Uriel Adriano (MEX)	3

==== Section 3 ====
Round of 128
Okan Şimşek (TUR)	DQ
~~Hani Al-Matrafi (KSA)~~

Round of 64
Anicet Kassi (CIV)	12
Okan Şimşek (TUR)	16
Rudy Mateo (DOM)	2
Huang Jiannan (CHN)	3
Spyridon Grammatikopoulos (GRE)	4
Hayk Khachatryan (ARM)	5
Vitali Kolas (BLR)	6
Samuel Morrison (PHI)	4

Round of 32
Okan Şimşek (TUR)	0
Huang Jiannan (CHN)	7
Hayk Khachatryan (ARM)	6
Vitali Kolas (BLR)	4

Round of 16
Huang Jiannan (CHN)	10
Hayk Khachatryan (ARM)	0

==== Section 4 ====
Round of 128
Arnold Nkoy (COD)	5
Loïc Lubin (MTN)	3

Round of 64
Henrique Precioso (BRA)	5
Kim Yoo-jin (KOR)	13
Marsel Peti (ALB)	W
Akbar Aitakhunov (KGZ)
Teodor Georgiev (BUL)	1
Michel Samaha (LIB)	3
Arnold Nkoy (COD)	4
Anas Al-Adarbi (JOR)	15

Round of 32
Kim Yoo-jin (KOR)	10^{K}
Marsel Peti (ALB)	0
Michel Samaha (LIB)	6
Anas Al-Adarbi (JOR)	5

Round of 16
Kim Yoo-jin (KOR)	11
Michel Samaha (LIB)	3

=== Bottom half ===
==== Section 5 ====
Round of 128
~~Tari Terry (VAN)~~	DQ
~~Gregory Markiet (SUR)~~	DQ

Round of 64
Saifeddine Trabelsi (TUN)
Bye
~~Baboucarr Bobb (GAM)~~
Bendik Øyan (NOR)	DQ
Sultan Al-Mutairi (KUW)	13
Andreas Charalampous (CYP)	12
Javier Medina (VEN)	4
Ilkin Shahbazov (AZE)	6

Round of 32
Saifeddine Trabelsi (TUN)	6
Bendik Øyan (NOR)	5
Sultan Al-Mutairi (KUW)	1
Ilkin Shahbazov (AZE)	2

Round of 16
Saifeddine Trabelsi (TUN)	8
Ilkin Shahbazov (AZE)	7

==== Section 6 ====
Round of 128
Serhiy Chaika (UKR)	6
Ahmed Maher Saad (QAT)	5

Round of 64
Karim Khairy (EGY)	6
Rostand Kiki (BEN)	10
José Estupiñan (COL)	DQ
~~Junior Louembet (GAB)~~
Benaiah Torkornoo (GHA)	5
Imants Kopjevs (LAT)	6
Serhiy Chaika (UKR)	2
Gorome Karé (SEN)	10

Round of 32
Rostand Kiki (BEN)	3
José Estupiñan (COL)	4
Imants Kopjevs (LAT)	1
Gorome Karé (SEN)	12^{P}

Round of 16
José Estupiñan (COL)	1
Gorome Karé (SEN)	8

==== Section 7 ====
Round of 128

Round of 64
Dmitriy Kim (UZB)	DQ
~~Hama Alzouma (NIG)~~
Carlos Solís (CRC)	0
Masoud Hajji-Zavareh (IRI)	7
Daniel Bălan (MDA)	DQ
~~Sidali Larbi Chérif (ALG)~~
José Cobas (CUB)	7
Mark López (USA)	2

Round of 32
Dmitriy Kim (UZB)	1
Masoud Hajji-Zavareh (IRI)	2
Daniel Bălan (MDA)	7
José Cobas (CUB)	16

Round of 16
Masoud Hajji-Zavareh (IRI)	4
José Cobas (CUB)	0

==== Section 8 ====
Round of 128
Remuela Tinirau (FPO)	4
Sergio García (ECU)	6

Round of 64
Ismaël Coulibaly (MLI)	13
Alon Elboher (ISR)	2
Damir Fejzić (SRB)	1
Albert Gaun (RUS)	7
Jack Marton (AUS)	3
Hsu Wei-hsiang (TPE)	2
Sergio García (ECU)	4
Torann Maizeroi (FRA)	8

Round of 32
Ismaël Coulibaly (MLI)	3
Albert Gaun (RUS)	8
Jack Marton (AUS)	6
Torann Maizeroi (FRA)	0

Round of 16
Albert Gaun (RUS)	4
Jack Marton (AUS)	1
