= 2017 World Taekwondo Championships – Men's lightweight =

Taekwondo competition

Men's lightweight at the 2017 World Championships
- Venue: Taekwondowon
- Dates: 25–26 June 2017
- Competitors: 80 from 80 nations

Medalists
gold medal	Maksim Khramtsov	Russia
silver medal	Nikita Rafalovich	Uzbekistan
bronze medal	Masoud Hajji-Zavareh	Iran
bronze medal	Kairat Sarymsakov	Kazakhstan

The men's lightweight is a competition featured at the 2017 World Taekwondo Championships, and was held at the Taekwondowon in Muju County, South Korea on June 25 and June 26. Lightweights were limited to a maximum of 74 kilograms in body mass.

== Results ==
Legend

- DQ — Won by disqualification
- P — Won by punitive declaration
- R — Won by referee stop contest
- W — Won by withdrawal

=== Finals ===
Quarterfinals		Semifinals		Final
Seif Eissa (EGY)	6
Masoud Hajji-Zavareh (IRI)	14^{DQ}	Masoud Hajji-Zavareh (IRI)
Maksim Khramtsov (RUS)	27	Maksim Khramtsov (RUS)	W
Kim Hun (KOR)	5			Maksim Khramtsov (RUS)	6
Nikita Rafalovich (UZB)	15			Nikita Rafalovich (UZB)	3
René Lizárraga (MEX)	7	Nikita Rafalovich (UZB)	10
Kairat Sarymsakov (KAZ)	5	Kairat Sarymsakov (KAZ)	8
Yang Tsung-yeh (TPE)	5

=== Top half ===
==== Section 1 ====
Round of 128
Faysal Sawadogo (BUR)	24
Vann Rithy (CAM)	2
Hugo Fernández (PAR)	22
Ghenadie Bitco (ROU)	25
Achitkhüügiin Natsagdorj (MGL)	DQ
~~Polat Baýramow (TKM)~~

Round of 64
Seif Eissa (EGY)	28
Faysal Sawadogo (BUR)	13
Georgios Kakouris (CYP)	23
Benjamin Reimeir (AUT)	15
Anicet Kassi (CIV)	28
Ghenadie Bitco (ROU)	14
Achitkhüügiin Natsagdorj (MGL)	25
Andrew Park (CAN)	15

Round of 32
Seif Eissa (EGY)	12
Georgios Kakouris (CYP)	3
Anicet Kassi (CIV)	18
Achitkhüügiin Natsagdorj (MGL)	34

Round of 16
Seif Eissa (EGY)	30
Achitkhüügiin Natsagdorj (MGL)	19

==== Section 2 ====
Round of 128
Filip Dodevski (MKD)	20
Angelo Emacin (HAI)	6
Mauro Busuttil (MLT)	21
Brian Joseph (MRI)	37

Round of 64
Damir Fejzić (SRB)	22
Filip Dodevski (MKD)	3
Akbar Aitakhunov (KGZ)	15
Anas Al-Adarbi (JOR)	16
Oleksandr Levinchuk (UKR)	13
Muhammad Faheem (PAK)	15
Brian Joseph (MRI)	0
Masoud Hajji-Zavareh (IRI)	22

Round of 32
Damir Fejzić (SRB)	3
Anas Al-Adarbi (JOR)	2
Muhammad Faheem (PAK)	6
Masoud Hajji-Zavareh (IRI)	22

Round of 16
Damir Fejzić (SRB)	3
Masoud Hajji-Zavareh (IRI)	5

==== Section 3 ====
Round of 128
~~Spencer Kondo (ZIM)~~	DQ
~~Richard Manirakiza (BDI)~~	DQ
Ren Ke (CHN)	27
Thinagaran Naidu Papunaidu (MAS)	12

Round of 64
Maksim Khramtsov (RUS)
Bye
Jorge González (AND)	3
Servet Tazegül (TUR)	2
Martin Stach (GER)	14
Georgios Roditis (GRE)	21
Ren Ke (CHN)	14
Daniel Quesada (ESP)	18

Round of 32
Maksim Khramtsov (RUS)	10^{R}
Jorge González (AND)	0
Georgios Roditis (GRE)	6
Daniel Quesada (ESP)	9

Round of 16
Maksim Khramtsov (RUS)	23^{P}
Daniel Quesada (ESP)	8

==== Section 4 ====
Round of 128
Sonexay Mangkheua (LAO)	6
Ghazi Al-Asmari (KSA)	26
Hayder Shkara (AUS)	20^{P}
Pun Chi Fai (MAC)	1

Round of 64
Saifeddine Trabelsi (TUN)	15
Ghazi Al-Asmari (KSA)	12
Xavier Bouldoires (FGT)	5
Raihau Chin (FRA)	11
John Asp (NOR)	15
Achraf Mahboubi (MAR)	20
Hayder Shkara (AUS)	15
Kim Hun (KOR)	24

Round of 32
Saifeddine Trabelsi (TUN)	16
Raihau Chin (FRA)	19^{P}
Achraf Mahboubi (MAR)	7
Kim Hun (KOR)	8

Round of 16
Raihau Chin (FRA)	15
Kim Hun (KOR)	22

=== Bottom half ===
==== Section 5 ====
Round of 128
Pradeep Dahiya (IND)	3
Sina Bahrami (AZE)	17^{P}
Shlomo Shazo (ISR)	W
Mohammad Ghanem (SYR)

Round of 64
Nikita Rafalovich (UZB)	16
Sina Bahrami (AZE)	5
Wilkin Heredia (DOM)	14
Mohammed Hamooda (QAT)	13
Neyder Lozano (COL)	18
Mikalai Yanukovich (BLR)	20
Shlomo Shazo (ISR)	11
Jorge Álvarez (ARG)	17

Round of 32
Nikita Rafalovich (UZB)	25
Wilkin Heredia (DOM)	4
Mikalai Yanukovich (BLR)	2
Jorge Álvarez (ARG)	10

Round of 16
Nikita Rafalovich (UZB)	23
Jorge Álvarez (ARG)	3

==== Section 6 ====
Round of 128
Amadou Fall (SEN)	16^{P}
Leonardo Cheiban (LBN)	11
~~Hamza Sadouki (ALG)~~	DQ
~~Donaldo Dizdari (ALB)~~	DQ

Round of 64
Jaysen Ishida (USA)	26^{P}
Amadou Fall (SEN)	1
Thomas Roubio (NCD)	3
Karol Hołubowicz (POL)	31
Samuel Morrison (PHI)	9
René Lizárraga (MEX)	19
Bye
Nicholas Corten (BEL)

Round of 32
Jaysen Ishida (USA)	25
Karol Hołubowicz (POL)	6
René Lizárraga (MEX)	8
Nicholas Corten (BEL)	6

Round of 16
Jaysen Ishida (USA)	12
René Lizárraga (MEX)	16

==== Section 7 ====
Round of 128
Eloy Boa Morte (STP)	28
Rowan Charles (GRN)	3
Davide Borgagni (SMR)	13
Nischal Man Shrestha (NEP)	15

Round of 64
Júlio Ferreira (POR)	12^{P}
Eloy Boa Morte (STP)	5
~~Segun Olushola (NGR)~~
Kairat Sarymsakov (KAZ)	DQ
Aurimas Klemas (LTU)	23
Yasuhiro Hamada (JPN)	11
Nischal Man Shrestha (NEP)	8
Teodor Georgiev (BUL)	19^{P}

Round of 32
Júlio Ferreira (POR)	5
Kairat Sarymsakov (KAZ)	6
Aurimas Klemas (LTU)	22
Teodor Georgiev (BUL)	11

Round of 16
Kairat Sarymsakov (KAZ)	15
Aurimas Klemas (LTU)	9

==== Section 8 ====
Round of 128
Seydou Fofana (MLI)	31
Soheil Ghassemi (ITA)	19
Ngawang Yonten (BHU)	4
Davit Vardumyan (ARM)	26

Round of 64
~~Arnold Nkoy (COD)~~
Seydou Fofana (MLI)	DQ
Tosh van Dijk (SUR)	11
Christian McNeish (GBR)	13
Nickollas Ribeiro (BRA)	10
Yang Tsung-yeh (TPE)	14
Davit Vardumyan (ARM)	5
Toni Kanaet (CRO)	27

Round of 32
Seydou Fofana (MLI)	18
Christian McNeish (GBR)	14
Yang Tsung-yeh (TPE)	16
Toni Kanaet (CRO)	7

Round of 16
Seydou Fofana (MLI)	9
Yang Tsung-yeh (TPE)	10
