= 2011 World Taekwondo Championships – Men's lightweight =

Taekwondo competition

Men's lightweight at the 2011 World Championships
- Venue: Gyeongju Indoor Stadium
- Dates: 4–5 May 2011
- Competitors: 74 from 74 nations

Medalists
gold medal	Alireza Nasr Azadani	Iran
silver medal	Patiwat Thongsalap	Thailand
bronze medal	Ismaël Coulibaly	Mali
bronze medal	Rıdvan Baygut	Turkey

The Men's lightweight is a competition featured at the 2011 World Taekwondo Championships, and was held at the Gyeongju Gymnasium in Gyeongju, South Korea on May 4 and May 5.

Lightweights were limited to a maximum of 74 kilograms in body mass.

== Results ==
Legend

- DQ — Won by disqualification
- W — Won by withdrawal

=== Finals ===
Quarterfinals		Semifinals		Final
Alireza Nasr Azadani (IRI)	7
Mark López (USA)	1	Alireza Nasr Azadani (IRI)	9
Ismaël Coulibaly (MLI)	9	Ismaël Coulibaly (MLI)	7
Manuel Mark (AUT)	7			Alireza Nasr Azadani (IRI)	9
Song Ji-hoon (KOR)	8			Patiwat Thongsalap (THA)	3
Patiwat Thongsalap (THA)	10	Patiwat Thongsalap (THA)	3
Ren Maomao (CHN)	5	Rıdvan Baygut (TUR)	1
Rıdvan Baygut (TUR)	12

=== Top half ===
==== Section 1 ====
Round of 128
Syed Adeel Shah (PAK)	0
Eugen Micu (ROU)	5

Round of 64
Alireza Nasr Azadani (IRI)	4
Eugen Micu (ROU)	1
~~Yahya Mahamud (KEN)~~
Shakhriyor Karimov (TJK)	DQ
Dương Thanh Tâm (VIE)	1
Christos Pilavakis (CYP)	2
Fong Ka Chun (HKG)	2
Juan Sánchez (PUR)	5

Round of 32
Alireza Nasr Azadani (IRI)	9
Shakhriyor Karimov (TJK)	1
Christos Pilavakis (CYP)	2
Juan Sánchez (PUR)	1

Round of 16
Alireza Nasr Azadani (IRI)	8
Christos Pilavakis (CYP)	2

==== Section 2 ====
Round of 128
Ciou Ching-hua (TPE)	2
Mark López (USA)	4
Christian dela Cruz (PHI)	6
Josef Petruška (CZE)	4

Round of 64
Elvin Mammadov (AZE)	1
Mark López (USA)	2
~~Kakesa Giresse (COD)~~	DQ
~~Romeo Nyakam (CMR)~~	DQ
Laith Othman (JOR)	3
Cristian Clementi (ITA)	4
Christian dela Cruz (PHI)	7
Saifeddine Trabelsi (TUN)	3

Round of 32
Mark López (USA)
Bye
Cristian Clementi (ITA)	10
Christian dela Cruz (PHI)	2

Round of 16
Mark López (USA)	1
Cristian Clementi (ITA)	1

==== Section 3 ====
Round of 128
~~Yousif Yaghoub (SUD)~~	DQ
~~Bassoum Mamoudou (HAI)~~	DQ

Round of 64
Uriel Adriano (MEX)
Bye
Aliaskhab Sirazhov (RUS)	4
Aibar Dyussebayev (KAZ)	2
Sawatvilay Phimmasone (LAO)	3
Ismaël Coulibaly (MLI)	7
Spyridon Grammatikopoulos (GRE)	1
Mokdad Ounis (GER)	8

Round of 32
Uriel Adriano (MEX)	6
Aliaskhab Sirazhov (RUS)	4
Ismaël Coulibaly (MLI)	4
Mokdad Ounis (GER)	3

Round of 16
Uriel Adriano (MEX)	7
Ismaël Coulibaly (MLI)	15

==== Section 4 ====
Round of 128
Yulius Fernando (INA)	2
Dimitar Mihaylov (BUL)	1

Round of 64
Manuel Mark (AUT)	9
Joel Remak (NED)	7
Gregor Pirš (SLO)	DQ
~~Knowledge Muchakati (ZIM)~~
Stuardo Solórzano (GUA)	5
Wilkin Heredia (DOM)	11
Yulius Fernando (INA)	0
Maxime Potvin (CAN)	6

Round of 32
Manuel Mark (AUT)	5
Gregor Pirš (SLO)	2
Wilkin Heredia (DOM)	5
Maxime Potvin (CAN)	7

Round of 16
Manuel Mark (AUT)	11
Maxime Potvin (CAN)	4

=== Bottom half ===
==== Section 5 ====
Round of 128
Rodney Wijnalduim (SUR)	DQ
~~Ahmed Ali (PLE)~~

Round of 64
Dmitriy Kim (UZB)	6
Rodney Wijnalduim (SUR)	3
Oleksandr Levinchuk (UKR)	6
Ahmed Maher Saad (QAT)	2
Song Ji-hoon (KOR)	8^{W}
Claudel Bassandza (CGO)	1
Hayder Shkara (AUS)	1
Torann Maizeroi (FRA)	11

Round of 32
Dmitriy Kim (UZB)	4
Oleksandr Levinchuk (UKR)	3
Song Ji-hoon (KOR)	14
Torann Maizeroi (FRA)	7

Round of 16
Dmitriy Kim (UZB)	3
Song Ji-hoon (KOR)	8

==== Section 6 ====
Round of 128
Yoshihiro Nagano (JPN)	1
Raúl Martínez (ESP)	5

Round of 64
Mahmoud Fathy (EGY)	DQ
~~Benaiah Torkornoo (GHA)~~
~~Julio Duque (COL)~~	DQ
~~Fualongo Latu Tovo (TGA)~~	DQ
~~Víctor Zepeda (HON)~~	DQ
~~Wisam Al-Harbi (IRQ)~~	DQ
Raúl Martínez (ESP)	4
Patiwat Thongsalap (THA)	10

Round of 32
Mahmoud Fathy (EGY)
Bye
Bye
Patiwat Thongsalap (THA)

Round of 16
Mahmoud Fathy (EGY)	5
Patiwat Thongsalap (THA)	13

==== Section 7 ====
Round of 128
Sean Joyce (IRL)	DQ
~~Jerome Browne (TRI)~~
Victor Boa (MOZ)	2
Tony Grisman (GBR)	6

Round of 64
~~Javier Medina (VEN)~~
Sean Joyce (IRL)	DQ
Ren Maomao (CHN)	10
Aleh Satsyk (BLR)	1
~~Carlos Calucho (ECU)~~	DQ
~~Alaafe Ashraf Omran (LBA)~~	DQ
Tony Grisman (GBR)	7
Gorome Kare (SEN)	3

Round of 32
Sean Joyce (IRL)	9
Ren Maomao (CHN)	11
Bye
Tony Grisman (GBR)

Round of 16
Ren Maomao (CHN)	9
Tony Grisman (GBR)	6

==== Section 8 ====
Round of 128
Jean-Marie Jahmar (ISV)	5
István Király (HUN)	4

Round of 64
Henrique Precioso (BRA)	3
Shota Gochiashvili (GEO)	2
Batmönkhiin Tüvshinjargal (MGL)	2
Vaughn Scott (NZL)	14
~~Aleksandar Veljanovski (MKD)~~
Yousef Al-Zubeydi (SWE)	DQ
Jean-Marie Jahmar (ISV)	0
Rıdvan Baygut (TUR)	15

Round of 32
Henrique Precioso (BRA)	7
Vaughn Scott (NZL)	4
Yousef Al-Zubeydi (SWE)	3
Rıdvan Baygut (TUR)	11

Round of 16
Henrique Precioso (BRA)	2
Rıdvan Baygut (TUR)	4
