= 2019 World Taekwondo Championships – Men's lightweight =

Men's lightweight at the 2019 World Championships
- Venue: Manchester Arena
- Dates: 17–18 May 2019
- Competitors: 56 from 55 nations

Medalists
gold medal	Simone Alessio	Italy
silver medal	Ahmad Abughaush	Jordan
bronze medal	Daniel Quesada	Spain
bronze medal	Kairat Sarymsakov	Kazakhstan

The men's lightweight is a competition featured at the 2019 World Taekwondo Championships, and was held at the Manchester Arena in Manchester, United Kingdom on 17 and 18 May. Lightweights were limited to a maximum of 74 kilograms in body mass.

== Results ==
Legend

- DQ — Won by disqualification
- P — Won by punitive declaration

=== Finals ===
Semifinals		Final
Simone Alessio (ITA)	18
Daniel Quesada (ESP)	10	Simone Alessio (ITA)	18
Kairat Sarymsakov (KAZ)	3	Ahmad Abughaush (JOR)	11
Ahmad Abughaush (JOR)	8

=== Top half ===
==== Section 1 ====
Round of 64
Leonardo Cheiban (LBN)	13
Xavier Bouldoires (FGT)	12
Dmitriy Artyukhin (RUS)	8
Chang Cheng-hao (TPE)	10
~~Ujjal Kumar Deb (BAN)~~
Simone Alessio (ITA)	DQ
Damir Fejzić (SRB)	22
Nakibwae Kanimisu (KIR)	2
Soufiane El-Asbi (MAR)	21
Kasra Mehdipournejad (WT)	19
Kostiantyn Kostenevych (UKR)	26
Kim Jee-seok (KOR)	20

Round of 32
Toni Kanaet (CRO)	18
Leonardo Cheiban (LBN)	3
Chang Cheng-hao (TPE)	7
Simone Alessio (ITA)	8
Damir Fejzić (SRB)	18
Soufiane El-Asbi (MAR)	17
Kostiantyn Kostenevych (UKR)	11
René Lizárraga (MEX)	18

Round of 16
Toni Kanaet (CRO)	8
Simone Alessio (ITA)	29
Damir Fejzić (SRB)	4
René Lizárraga (MEX)	6

Quarterfinals
Simone Alessio (ITA)	5
René Lizárraga (MEX)	4

==== Section 2 ====
Round of 64
Mitko Dzhordzhev (BUL)	15
Mohammed Hamooda (QAT)	2
Darlyn Padilla (ECU)	8
Yousef Sanasyeri (KUW)	19
Jerome Browne (TTO)	0
Victor Asp (NOR)	29
Henrique Precioso (BRA)	20
Syafiq Zuber (MAS)	16
Abdullah Al-Qarni (KSA)	22
Ren Ke (CHN)	27
Miguel Trejos (COL)	7
Amir Mohammad Bakhshi (IRI)	16

Round of 32
Daniel Quesada (ESP)	24
Mitko Dzhordzhev (BUL)	9
Yousef Sanasyeri (KUW)	10
Victor Asp (NOR)	30
Henrique Precioso (BRA)	4
Ren Ke (CHN)	16
Amir Mohammad Bakhshi (IRI)	11
Christian McNeish (GBR)	7

Round of 16
Daniel Quesada (ESP)	10
Victor Asp (NOR)	9
Ren Ke (CHN)	15
Amir Mohammad Bakhshi (IRI)	23

Quarterfinals
Daniel Quesada (ESP)	12
Amir Mohammad Bakhshi (IRI)	11

=== Bottom half ===
==== Section 3 ====
Round of 64
Francesco Maiani (SMR)	5
Aykhan Taghizade (AZE)	18
Martin Stach (GER)	13
Or Pak Lam (HKG)	12
Alex Ryder (NZL)	4
Jack Marton (AUS)	30^{P}
Kairat Sarymsakov (KAZ)	14
Butrint Ejupi (KOS)	5
Dave Cea (PHI)	7
Yasuhiro Hamada (JPN)	11
Uladzislau Halizin (BLR)	21
Casper Morild (DEN)	6

Round of 32
Thomas Rahimi (USA)	11
Aykhan Taghizade (AZE)	8
Martin Stach (GER)	6
Jack Marton (AUS)	9
Kairat Sarymsakov (KAZ)	5
Yasuhiro Hamada (JPN)	3
Uladzislau Halizin (BLR)	3
Júlio Ferreira (POR)	14

Round of 16
Thomas Rahimi (USA)	9
Jack Marton (AUS)	13
Kairat Sarymsakov (KAZ)	10
Júlio Ferreira (POR)	7

Quarterfinals
Jack Marton (AUS)	9
Kairat Sarymsakov (KAZ)	13

==== Section 4 ====
Round of 64
Barış Dağ (TUR)	13
Éloi Paradis-Deschênes (CAN)	11
Mehdi Jermami (FRA)	26
David Boui (CAF)	16
Firas Katoussi (TUN)	9
Seif Eissa (EGY)	8
Ahmad Abughaush (JOR)	20^{P}
Giovanni Slanec (SVK)	3
Franco Aurora (PER)	10
Georgios Roditis (GRE)	24
Rostand Kiki (BEN)	13
Christos Pilavakis (CYP)	0

Round of 32
Badr Achab (BEL)	14
Barış Dağ (TUR)	19
Mehdi Jermami (FRA)	15
Firas Katoussi (TUN)	11
Ahmad Abughaush (JOR)	29
Georgios Roditis (GRE)	12
Rostand Kiki (BEN)	10
Nikita Rafalovich (UZB)	15

Round of 16
Barış Dağ (TUR)	23
Mehdi Jermami (FRA)	21
Ahmad Abughaush (JOR)	18
Nikita Rafalovich (UZB)	16

Quarterfinals
Barış Dağ (TUR)	4
Ahmad Abughaush (JOR)	24
