= 2016 African Taekwondo Olympic Qualification Tournament =

Taekwondo competition

The 2016 African Qualification Tournament for Rio Olympic Games was held in Agadir, Morocco from February 6 to February 7, 2016. Each country may enter maximum 2 male and 2 female divisions with only one in each division and the first two ranked athletes per weight division qualify their NOCs a place each for Olympic Games.

== Qualification summary ==
NOC	Men				Women				Total
NOC	−58kg	−68kg	−80kg	+80kg	−49kg	−57kg	−67kg	+67kg	Total
Cape Verde					X				1
Democratic Republic of the Congo					X				1
Egypt		X					X		2
Ivory Coast							X	X	2
Libya	X								1
Mali			X						1
Morocco	X					X		X	3
Niger				X					1
Senegal		X							1
Tunisia			X	X		X			3
Total: 10 NOCs	2	2	2	2	2	2	2	2	16

== Men ==
=== −58 kg ===
6 February

Round of 16
Marumo Moloisane (LES)	DQ
~~Martin Oduor (KEN)~~

Quarterfinals
Romain Trolliet (ALG)	2
Marumo Moloisane (LES)	3
Wandile Maziya (SWZ)	6
Omar Hajjami (MAR)	18
Faisal Jeylani Aweys (SOM)	2
Sisay Baykedagne (ETH)	8
Terrance Asare (GHA)	2
Yousef Shriha (LBA)	15

Semifinals
Marumo Moloisane (LES)	1
Omar Hajjami (MAR)	3
Sisay Baykedagne (ETH)	5
Yousef Shriha (LBA)	8

Final
Omar Hajjami (MAR)	RSC
Yousef Shriha (LBA)

=== −68 kg ===
7 February

Round of 32
Christopher Dubois (MAD)	16–14	Adem Shriha (LBA)
Yannick Nascimento (CPV)	1–3	Koami Aziakonou (TOG)
Eloy Boa Morte (STP)	17–4	Emmanuel Wambugu (KEN)
Ramosoeu Nkuebe (LES)	5–3	James Paterson (MRI)

Round of 16
Balla Dièye (SEN)	8
Christopher Dubois (MAD)	3
Valery Nyamsik (CMR)	3
Solomon Tefera (ETH)	8
Marc Mbombo (COD)	2
Ilyas Belleili (ALG)	6
Koami Aziakonou (TOG)	1
Edwin Samson (NGR)	8
David Boui (CAF)	3
Eloy Boa Morte (STP)	2
Abdalaziz Abdalla (SUD)	1
Jean Moloise Ogoudjobi (BEN)	8
Faical Saidi (MAR)	13
Thandukukhanya Dlamini (SWZ)	1
Ramosoeu Nkuebe (LES)
Ghofran Zaki (EGY)	RSC

Quarterfinals
Balla Dièye (SEN)	5
Solomon Tefera (ETH)	3
Ilyas Belleili (ALG)	6
Edwin Samson (NGR)	8
David Boui (CAF)	4
Jean Moloise Ogoudjobi (BEN)	3
Faical Saidi (MAR)	3
Ghofran Zaki (EGY)	7

Semifinals
Balla Dièye (SEN)	RSC
Edwin Samson (NGR)
David Boui (CAF)	1
Ghofran Zaki (EGY)	7

Final
Balla Dièye (SEN)	1
Ghofran Zaki (EGY)	2

=== −80 kg ===
7 February

Round of 16
Lenine Soares (CPV)	1
Augustin Bata (CMR)	2
Arnold Nkoy (COD)	9
Abdelrahman Babiker (SUD)	0
Yoven Soobramaney (MRI)	7
Hama Alzouma (NIG)	20
Rostand Kiki (BEN)	3
Ibrahim Benoud Radjab (CHA)	4

Quarterfinals
Oussama Oueslati (TUN)	7
Augustin Bata (CMR)	1
Arnold Nkoy (COD)	4
Gorome Karé (SEN)	10
Seif Eissa (EGY)	10
Hama Alzouma (NIG)	6
Ibrahim Benoud Radjab (CHA)	3
Ismaël Coulibaly (MLI)	10

Semifinals
Oussama Oueslati (TUN)	16
Gorome Karé (SEN)	6
Seif Eissa (EGY)	3
Ismaël Coulibaly (MLI)	8

Final
Oussama Oueslati (TUN)	2
Ismaël Coulibaly (MLI)	0

=== +80 kg ===
6 February

Quarterfinals
Rémy Alazoula (CAF)	8
David Adjetey (GHA)	2
Firmin Zokou (CIV)	RSC
Yamikani Guba (MAW)
Daba Modibo Keïta (MLI)	1
Abdoul Razak Issoufou (NIG)	2

Semifinals
Yassine Trabelsi (TUN)	6
Rémy Alazoula (CAF)	1
Firmin Zokou (CIV)	9
Abdoul Razak Issoufou (NIG)	10

Final
Yassine Trabelsi (TUN)	1
Abdoul Razak Issoufou (NIG)	0

== Women ==
=== −49 kg ===
6 February

Round of 16
Khady Fall (SEN)	DQ
~~Felana Razafinimanana (MAD)~~
Afkar Drag (SUD)	5
Eklou Sofonke (TOG)	17

Quarterfinals
Fadia Farhani (TUN)	2
Khady Fall (SEN)	0
Sondess Ben Tahar (ALG)	6
Maria Andrade (CPV)	18
Nardos Chifra (ETH)	9
Michelle Tau (LES)	0
Eklou Sofonke (TOG)	1
Rosa Keleku (COD)	12

Semifinals
Fadia Farhani (TUN)	1
Maria Andrade (CPV)	4
Nardos Chifra (ETH)	3
Rosa Keleku (COD)	6

Final
Maria Andrade (CPV)	2
Rosa Keleku (COD)	3

=== −57 kg ===
7 February

Round of 16
Hakima El-Meslahy (MAR)	12
Tasneem Tawil (LBA)	0
Mildred Alango (KEN)	16
Noha Sour (SUD)	9

Quarterfinals
Bineta Diédhiou (SEN)	5
Hakima El-Meslahy (MAR)	10
Metadel Hunachew (ETH)	2
Chinazum Nwosu (NGR)	10
Danielle Pelham (GHA)	5
Josseline Eyenga (CMR)	3
Mildred Alango (KEN)	0
Rahma Ben Ali (TUN)	12

Semifinals
Hakima El-Meslahy (MAR)	3
Chinazum Nwosu (NGR)	0
Danielle Pelham (GHA)	1
Rahma Ben Ali (TUN)	9

Final
Hakima El-Meslahy (MAR)	1
Rahma Ben Ali (TUN)	1

=== −67 kg ===
6 February

Quarterfinals		Semifinals		Final
Seham El-Sawalhy (EGY)	6
Nana Doumbia (MLI)	4	Seham El-Sawalhy (EGY)	10
Naomie Katoka (COD)	8	Sofia Reis (CPV)	2
Sofia Reis (CPV)	9			Seham El-Sawalhy (EGY)	4
Urgence Mouega (GAB)	15			Ruth Gbagbi (CIV)	10
Karima Zakari (NIG)	1	Urgence Mouega (GAB)	5
Gladys Mwaniki (KEN)	1	Ruth Gbagbi (CIV)	14
Ruth Gbagbi (CIV)	14

=== +67 kg ===
7 February

Quarterfinals		Semifinals		Final
		Wiam Dislam (MAR)	6
Carlota Munave (SWZ)	4	Uzoamaka Otuadinma (NGR)	1
Uzoamaka Otuadinma (NGR)	9			Wiam Dislam (MAR)	0
Aminata Doumbia (MLI)	9			Mamina Koné (CIV)	1
Linda Azzeddine (ALG)	5	Aminata Doumbia (MLI)	1
		Mamina Koné (CIV)	3
