= Kostiantyn Kostenevych =

Ukrainian taekwondo practitioner (born 1999)

- Kostenevych and his coach Nam in Tallinn in 2023

Personal information
- Full name: Kostiantyn Dmytrovych Kostenevych
- Nationality: Ukraine
- Born: 25 June 1999 (age 27) Kharkiv, Ukraine

Sport
- Sport: Taekwondo
- Event: 80 kg
- Club: ShVSM (Kyiv)
- Coached by: Oleh Nam
Medal record
Men's taekwondo
Representing Ukraine
European Championships
Silver medal – second place	2024 Belgrade	80 kg
European Championships Olympic Categories
Gold medal – first place	2023 Tallinn	87 kg
World Juniors Championships
Silver medal – second place	2016 Burnaby	68 kg
European U21 Championships
Gold medal – first place	2019 Helsingborg	74 kg
Bronze medal – third place	2016 Grozny	74 kg
European Cadets Championships
Gold medal – first place	2013 Bucharest	53 kg

Kostiantyn Dmytrovych Kostenevych (Ukrainian: Костянтин Дмитрович Костеневич; born 25 June 1999 in Kharkiv) is a Ukrainian taekwondo practitioner. He is 2024 European Championships silver medalist.

== Career ==
First World Championships Kostenevych competed at was the 2019 tournament. In Manchester, he defeated Kim Jee-seok from South Korea but lost in the round of 32 to Mexican René Lizárraga. The next World Championships was more successful. He reached quarterfinals by defeating Yarobis Castañeda from Cuba, Faysal Sawadogo from Burkina Faso, and Richard Ordemann from Norway, but after that he lost to Seif Eissa from Egypt.

In 2023, Kostenevych represented Ukraine at the 2023 European Games. He defeated Júlio Ferreira from Portugal but lost to Polish Szymon Piątkowski in the quarterfinal.

Kostenevych was selected for the 2024 European Olympic Qualification Tournament, but he failed to qualify for the 2024 Summer Olympics. In Sofia, he defeated Szymon Piątkowski from Poland but lost to Serbian Stefan Takov in the quarterfinals.

First major international success at senior level came in May 2024 when he won silver at the 2024 European Championships in Belgrade, defeating in the semifinal "neutral" Russian 2020 Olympic gold medalist Maksim Khramtsov and losing in the final to 2020 Olympic bronze medallist Toni Kanaet from Croatia.
