= 2016 Oceania Taekwondo Olympic Qualification Tournament =

Taekwondo competition

- Venue: Taurama Aquatic & Leisure Centre
- Location: Port Moresby, Papua New Guinea
- Dates: 27 February 2016

The 2016 Oceania Qualification Tournament for Rio Olympic Games took place in 27 February 2016 at the Taurama Aquatic & Leisure Centre in Port Moresby, Papua New Guinea. The winners of each of the eight categories qualifies for the Olympics.

Athletes from Australia, New Zealand, Papua New Guinea and Tonga qualified for the Olympics.

== Qualification summary ==
NOC	Men				Women				Total
NOC	−58kg	−68kg	−80kg	+80kg	−49kg	−57kg	−67kg	+67kg	Total
Australia	X		X			X	X		4
New Zealand					X				1
Papua New Guinea		X						X	2
Tonga				X					1
Total: 4 NOCs	1	1	1	1	1	1	1	1	8

== Men ==
=== −58 kg ===
Final
Safwan Khalil (AUS)
Isaac Myrie (SOL)

=== −68 kg ===
Semifinals	Final
Bruce Jonathan (VAN)
Herick Henry (SOL)	Bruce Jonathan (VAN)
Maxemillion Kassman (PNG)	Maxemillion Kassman (PNG)
Arash Arian (ROA)

=== −80 kg ===
Final
Hayder Shkara (AUS)
Vaughn Scott (NZL)

=== +80 kg ===
Semifinals		Final
Dafydd Sanders (NZL)
Joseph Mackie (VAN)		Dafydd Sanders (NZL)	2
Jonathan Paschalis (PNG)	3	Pita Taufatofua (TGA)	3
Pita Taufatofua (TGA)	4

== Women ==
=== −49 kg ===
Final
Andrea Kilday (NZL)
Rose Tona (PNG)

=== −57 kg ===
- Caroline Marton (AUS) qualified automatically.

=== −67 kg ===
Final
Carmen Marton (AUS)
Rhiannon O'Neill (NZL)

=== +67 kg ===
- Samantha Kassman (PNG) qualified automatically.
