= Taekwondo at the 2015 European Games – Men's 80 kg =

Taekwondo competition

Men's 80 kg at the 2015 European Games
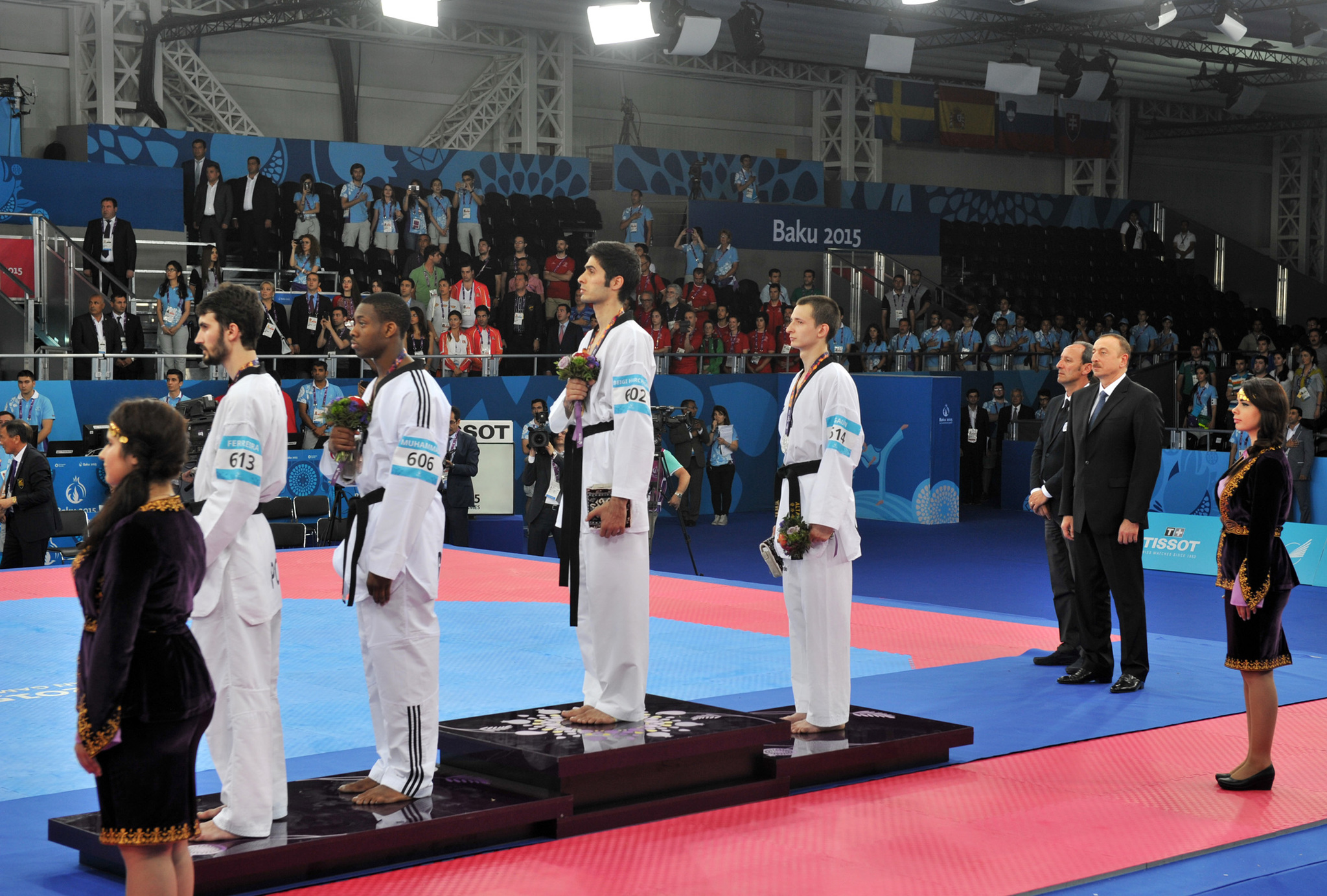
- The medal ceremony.
- Venue: Crystal Hall complex
- Date: 18 June
- Competitors: 16 from 16 nations

Medalists
gold medal	Milad Beigi	Azerbaijan
silver medal	Albert Gaun	Russia
bronze medal	Lutalo Muhammad	Great Britain
bronze medal	Júlio Ferreira	Portugal

Men's 80 kg competition at the Taekwondo at the 2015 European Games in Baku, Azerbaijan, took place on 15 June at Crystal Hall complex.

== Schedule ==
All times are Azerbaijan Summer Time (UTC+5).

Date	Time	Event
Tuesday, 18 June 2015	11:00	1/8 finals
Tuesday, 18 June 2015	13:00	Quarterfinals
Tuesday, 18 June 2015	13:00	Semifinals
Tuesday, 18 June 2015	15:00	Repechage
Tuesday, 18 June 2015	19:00	Finals

== Results ==
Legend

- P — Won by punitive declaration

1/8 finals
Aaron Cook (MDA)	14
Arbes Jahiri (KOS)	1
Raúl Martínez (ESP)	4
Júlio Ferreira (POR)	10
Lutalo Muhammad (GBR)	16
Teodor Georgiev (BUL)	4
Damir Fejzić (SRB)	0
Milad Beigi (AZE)	12
Tahir Güleç (GER)	2
Roberto Botta (ITA)	3
Piotr Paziński (POL)	3
Torann Maizeroi (FRA)	4
Yunus Sarı (TUR)	2
Arman Yeremyan (ARM)	4
Richard Ordemann (NOR)	5
Albert Gaun (RUS)	12

Quarterfinals
Aaron Cook (MDA)	7
Júlio Ferreira (POR)	8
Lutalo Muhammad (GBR)	5
Milad Beigi (AZE)	17
Roberto Botta (ITA)	7
Torann Maizeroi (FRA)	6
Arman Yeremyan (ARM)	2
Albert Gaun (RUS)	5

Semifinals
Júlio Ferreira (POR)	2
Milad Beigi (AZE)	6
Roberto Botta (ITA)	5
Albert Gaun (RUS)	6

Final
Milad Beigi (AZE)	9
Albert Gaun (RUS)	4

=== Repechage ===
Repechage round 1
Damir Fejzić (SRB)	7
Lutalo Muhammad (GBR)	8
Richard Ordemann (NOR)	8
Arman Yeremyan (ARM)	4

Bronze medal match
Roberto Botta (ITA)	7
Lutalo Muhammad (GBR)	12^{P}
Richard Ordemann (NOR)	5
Júlio Ferreira (POR)	6
