= Mbombo (disambiguation) =

Mbombo is the creator god in the religion and mythology of the Kuba people.

Mbombo may also refer to:

== People ==
- Aziana Ebele Mbombo (born 1980), French footballer
- Idris Mbombo (born 1996), Congolese footballer
- Kule Mbombo (born 1996), Congolese footballer
- Marc Mbombo (born 1992), Congolese Taekwondo practitioner
- Nomafrench Mbombo (born 1966), South African politician
- Nozizwe Mbombo, South African politician
- Yanis Mbombo (born 1994), Belgian footballer

== Places ==
- Mbombo, São Tomé and Príncipe
