= Kairat Sarymsakov =

Kazakhstani taekwondo practitioner

Personal information
- Born: 31 May 1989 (age 37)

Sport
- Sport: Taekwondo
Medal record
Men's taekwondo
Representing Kazakhstan
World Championships
Bronze medal – third place	2017 Muju	Lightweight
Bronze medal – third place	2019 Manchester	Lightweight

Kairat Sarymsakov (born May 31, 1989) is a Kazakh Taekwondo athlete who won a bronze medal at the 2017 World Taekwondo Championships after being defeated by Nikita Rafalovich.

In 2017, he won the silver medal in the men's −74 kg event at the 2017 Asian Indoor and Martial Arts Games held in Ashgabat, Turkmenistan.
