= Taekwondo at the 2018 Mediterranean Games – Men's 80 kg =

Taekwondo competition

Taekwondo – Men's 80 kg at the 2018 Mediterranean Games
- Venue: Salou Pavilion
- Date: 29 June
- Competitors: 15 from 15 nations

Medalists
gold medal	Raúl Martínez García	Spain
silver medal	Seif Eissa	Egypt
bronze medal	Júlio Ferreira	Portugal
bronze medal	Yunus Sarı	Turkey

The men's 80 kg competition of the taekwondo events at the 2018 Mediterranean Games took place on the 29 of June at the Salou Pavilion.

== Schedule ==
All times are Central European Summer Time (UTC+2).

Date	Time	Round
June 29, 2018	10:00	Preliminaries
June 29, 2018	17:00	Finals

== Results ==
Legend

- PTG — Won by Points Gap
- SUP — Won by superiority
- OT — Won on over time (Golden Point)
- DQ — Won by disqualification
- PUN — Won by punitive declaration
- WD — Won by withdrawal

=== Main bracket ===
Preliminary round
9	Ismael Bouzid-Souihli (FRA)	21
8	Apostolos Telikostoglou (GRE)	15
5	Roberto Botta (ITA)	27
13	Filip Dodevski (MKD)	8
Karlo Galić (BIH)	0
4	Yunus Sarı (TUR)	6
3	Raúl Martínez García (ESP)	26 (PTG)
Butrint Ejupi (KOS)	0
12	Francesco Maiani (SMR)	4
6	Damir Fejzić (SRB)	12
7	Achraf Mahboubi (MAR)	25 (PTG)
10	Jorge Gonzalez Ferrer (AND)	5

Quarter-finals
1	Seif Eissa (EGY)	21
9	Ismael Bouzid-Souihli (FRA)	13
5	Roberto Botta (ITA)	7
4	Yunus Sarı (TUR)	10
3	Raúl Martínez García (ESP)	14
6	Damir Fejzić (SRB)	2
10	Achraf Mahboubi (MAR)	13
2	Júlio Ferreira (POR)	14

Semi-finals
1	Seif Eissa (EGY)	16
4	Yunus Sarı (TUR)	6
3	Raúl Martínez García (ESP)	19
2	Júlio Ferreira (POR)	6

Gold medal match
1	Seif Eissa (EGY)	14
3	Raúl Martínez García (ESP)	17
