= Nozizwe =

Nozizwe may refer to:

- Nozizwe, a township in Venterstad
- Nozizwe Cynthia Jele, South African novelist most often known as Cynthia Jele
- Nozizwe Madlala-Routledge (born 1952), South African politician
- Nozizwe Mbombo, South African politician
