= Taekwondo at the 2015 African Games =

Taekwondo competition

- Location: Republic of the Congo; Brazzaville
- Dates: 16-18 September

Taekwondo at the 2015 African Games in Brazzaville was held between September 16–18, 2015.

== Results ==
=== Women's Finweight -46kg ===
- (gold) Nardos Chifra (ETH)
- (silver) Fadia Farhani (TUN)
- (bronze) Bouma Ferimata Coulibaly (CIV)
- (bronze) Aya Ali Roubi (EGY)

=== Women's Flyweight -49kg ===
- (gold) Nour Abdelsalam (EGY)
- (silver) Rosa Keleku Lukusa (COD)
- (bronze) Joy Ekhator (NGA)
- (bronze) Oumou Koultoumy (GUI)

=== Women's Bantamweight -53kg ===
- (gold) Radhoua Abdelkader (EGY)
- (silver) Chinazum Nwosu (NGA)
- (bronze) Rahma Ben Ali (TUN)
- (bronze) Daniella Pelham (GHA)

=== Women's Featherweight -57kg ===
- (gold) Bineta Diedhiou (SEN)
- (silver) Hedaya Malak (EGY)
- (bronze) Josseline Eyenga (CMR)
- (bronze) Brenda Mahonza (COD)

=== Women's Lightweight -62kg ===
- (gold) Ruth Gbagbi (CIV)
- (silver) Rewan Refaei (EGY)
- (bronze) Gradie Kamwanya Mpoyi (COD)
- (bronze) Urgence Mouega Mouega (GAB)

=== Women's Welterweight -67kg ===
- (gold) Sihem El-Sawalhy (EGY)
- (silver) Mariam Diarra (MLI)
- (bronze) Nadège N’dri (CIV)
- (bronze) Ifeoma Juliet Dennis (NGA)

=== Women's Middleweight -73kg ===
- (gold) Uzomaka Otuadinma (NGA)
- (silver) Maysoun Farouk (EGY)
- (bronze) Mamina Kone (CIV)
- (bronze) Aminata Doumbia (MLI)

=== Women's Heavyweight +73kg ===
- (gold) Mennat-Allah Maher (EGY)
- (silver) Ester Uzoukwu (NGA)
- (bronze) Lynda Azzedine (ALG)
- (bronze) Hadja Fatoumata Djabate (CIV)

=== Men's Finweight -54kg ===
- (gold) Moâadh Nabil (EGY)
- (silver) Moustapha Kama (SEN)
- (bronze) Hedi Neffati (TUN)
- (bronze) Alhoudourou Maiga (MLI)

=== Men's Flyweight -58kg ===
- (gold) Romain Trolliet (ALG)
- (silver) Mohammad Tariq Jamilou (NGA)
- (bronze) Shaouky El-Said (EGY)
- (bronze) Tadjou Wasiu Amao (CIV)

=== Men's Bantamweight -63kg ===
- (gold) Youssef Aly (EGY)
- (silver) Edwin Samson (NGA)
- (bronze) Waheed ElBriki (TUN)
- (bronze) Oumar Sissoko (MLI)

=== Men's Featherweight -68kg ===
- (gold) Ghofran Zaki (EGY)
- (silver) Balla Dieye (SEN)
- (bronze) Seifeddine Trabelsi (TUN)
- (bronze) Marc Mbombo (COD)

=== Men's Lightweight -74kg ===
- (gold) Ismaël Coulibaly (MLI)
- (silver) Seif Eissa (EGY)
- (bronze) Arnold Nkoy (COD)
- (bronze) Anicet Kassi (CIV)

=== Men's Welterweight -80kg ===
- (gold) Cheick Sallah Cissé (CIV)
- (silver) Oussama Oueslati (TUN)
- (bronze) Taha Al Aswed (LBA)
- (bronze) Gorame Kare (SEN)

=== Men's Middleweight -87kg ===
- (gold) Yassine Trabelsi (TUN)
- (silver) David Adjetey (GHA)
- (bronze) Seydou Gbané (CIV)
- (bronze) Abderrahman Gouhari (EGY)

=== Men's Heavyweight +87kg ===
- (gold) Abdoul Razak Issoufou (NIG)
- (silver) Anthony Obame (GAB)
- (bronze) Mohamed Aymen (EGY)
- (bronze) Zokou Firmin (CIV)

== Medal table ==
As of September 18, 2015

Rank	Nation	Gold	Silver	Bronze	Total
1	Egypt (EGY)	7	4	4	15
2	Ivory Coast (CIV)	2	0	8	10
3	Nigeria (NGR)	1	4	2	7
4	Tunisia (TUN)	1	2	4	7
5	Senegal (SEN)	1	2	1	4
6	Mali (MLI)	1	1	3	5
7	Algeria (ALG)	1	0	1	2
8	Ethiopia (ETH)	1	0	0	1
8	Niger (NIG)	1	0	0	1
10	Democratic Republic of the Congo (COD)	0	1	4	5
11	Gabon (GAB)	0	1	1	2
11	Ghana (GHA)	0	1	1	2
13	Botswana (BOT)	0	0	1	1
13	Kenya (KEN)	0	0	1	1
13	South Africa (RSA)	0	0	1	1
Totals (15 entries)		16	16	32	64
