= Urgence Mouega =

Gabonese taekwondo practitioner

Personal information
- Born: 16 November 1994 (age 31)

Sport
- Country: Gabon
- Sport: Taekwondo
Medal record
Women's taekwondo
Representing Gabon
African Games
Gold medal – first place	2011 Maputo	–62 kg
Silver medal – second place	2023 Accra	–73 kg
Bronze medal – third place	2015 Brazzaville	–62 kg
Bronze medal – third place	2019 Rabat	–67 kg

Urgence Mouega (born 16 November 1994) is a taekwondo practitioner from Gabon who won a gold medal in the women's lightweight at the 2011 All-Africa Games. In the same event at the 2015 African Games she finished with a bronze medal. She has competed in two editions of the World Taekwondo Championships. At the 2016 African Taekwondo Olympic Qualification Tournament she was a semi-final win away from qualifying for the Rio Olympics.

In 2023, she competed in the women's middleweight event at the World Taekwondo Championships held in Baku, Azerbaijan.
