= Andrew Deer =

English taekwondo practitioner

Personal information
- Full name: Andrew William James Deer
- Nationality: British
- Born: Sutton Coldfield, England

Sport
- Country: United Kingdom
- Sport: Taekwondo
- Event(s): -74 kg ,–80 kg
- Club: Tamworth Manchester Aces
- Team: AD Taekwondo
- Turned pro: 2010
- Coached by: Paul Green
- Retired: 2016
- Now coaching: Amy Truesdale · Matthew Bush · Joseph Lane · Beth Munro

Achievements and titles
- Highest world ranking: WR 5th −74 kg
Medal record
Men's taekwondo
Representing Great Britain
Commonwealth Championships
| Gold medal – first place | 2014 Edinburgh | −74 kg |
European Championships
| Bronze medal – third place | 2014 Baku | −74 kg |

Andrew Deer is an English taekwondo athlete.

In 2015, Deer representing Great Britain, competed in the -74kg category in the 2015 World Taekwondo Championships in May 2015. In 2017, he became a National Development Coach on the Sports England funded programme. In 2018 after working as project lead coach, Great Britain Taekwondo was awarded sufficient funding for a full to programme, and as a result of the funding, he became Great Britain's first Taekwondo Paralympic Coach.
