= Taekwondo at the 2015 Pacific Games =

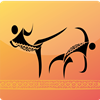
- Taekwondo pictogram for the Games
- Venue: Taurama Aquatic & Indoor Centre, Port Moresby
- Dates: 16–18 July

Taekwondo at the 2015 Pacific Games in Port Moresby, Papua New Guinea was held on July 16–17, 2015.

== Medal summary ==
=== Medal table ===
* Host nation (Papua New Guinea)

Rank	Nation	Gold	Silver	Bronze	Total
1	Australia	9	4	0	13
2	French Polynesia	6	3	5	14
3	Papua New Guinea*	2	5	8	15
4	New Zealand	1	4	2	7
5	Solomon Islands	0	1	2	3
6	Vanuatu	0	1	1	2
7	New Caledonia	0	0	6	6
8	Fiji	0	0	3	3
9	Kiribati	0	0	2	2
10	Guam	0	0	1	1
10	Tonga	0	0	1	1
12	Samoa	0	0	0	0
Totals (12 entries)		18	18	31	67

=== Men's results ===
Event	Gold	Silver	Bronze	Refs
−54 kg	Bobby Willie (PNG)	Isaac Pat Myrie (SOL)	Prabhat Prasad (FIJ)	
−54 kg	Bobby Willie (PNG)	Isaac Pat Myrie (SOL)	Sean Wells (NZL)	
−58 kg	Safwan Khalil (AUS)	Teddy Teng (TAH)	Maxemillion Kassman (PNG)	
−58 kg	Safwan Khalil (AUS)	Teddy Teng (TAH)	Johan Hardel (NCL)	
−63 kg	Thomas Auger (AUS)	Rainner Pennie (PNG)	Sam Jason (MHL)	
−63 kg	Thomas Auger (AUS)	Rainner Pennie (PNG)	Kaheiani Pittman (TAH)	
−68 kg	Thomas Afconcenko (AUS)	Bruce Johnathan (VAN)	Manu Huuatua (TAH)	
−68 kg	Thomas Afconcenko (AUS)	Bruce Johnathan (VAN)	Julien Bessieres (NCL)	
−74 kg	Jack Marton (AUS)	Peter Babka (TAH)	Jonathan Paschalis (PNG)	
−74 kg	Jack Marton (AUS)	Peter Babka (TAH)	Nelson Tabaua (KIR)	
−80 kg	Hayder Shkara (AUS)	Vaughn Scott (NZL)	Alexander Allen (GUM)	
−80 kg	Hayder Shkara (AUS)	Vaughn Scott (NZL)	Teava Mu (TAH)	
−87 kg	Waldeck Defaix (TAH)	Daniel Stafstrom (AUS)	Dafydd Sanders (NZL)	
−87 kg	Waldeck Defaix (TAH)	Daniel Stafstrom (AUS)	Pranit Parvat Kumar (FIJ)	
+87 kg	Lloyd Tuarai Hery (TAH)	Nicolas Dorman (NZL)	Sam Ware (PNG)	
+87 kg	Lloyd Tuarai Hery (TAH)	Nicolas Dorman (NZL)	Karel Orthosie (NCL)	
Team	Tahiti	Papua New Guinea	Solomon Islands	
Team	Tahiti	Papua New Guinea	Vanuatu	

=== Women's Events ===
Event	Gold	Silver	Bronze	Refs
−46 kg	Andrea Kilday (NZL)	Deanna Kyriazopoulos (AUS)	Rosemary Tona (PNG)	
−49 kg	Keshena Waterford (AUS)	Rahab Loi (PNG)	Lindsay Gavin (NCL)	
−49 kg	Keshena Waterford (AUS)	Rahab Loi (PNG)	Taraina Rataro-Tuihaa (TAH)	
−53 kg	Caroline Marton (AUS)	Alison Deane (TAH)	Doriane Gohé (NCL)	
−53 kg	Caroline Marton (AUS)	Alison Deane (TAH)	Theresa Tona (PNG)	
−57 kg	Mataheitini Raihauti (TAH)	Catherine Risbey (AUS)	Doris David (PNG)	
−57 kg	Mataheitini Raihauti (TAH)	Catherine Risbey (AUS)	Jess Trahan (NCL)	
−62 kg	Carmen Marton (AUS)	Rhiannon O'Neill (NZL)	Stephanie Kombo (PNG)	
−62 kg	Carmen Marton (AUS)	Rhiannon O'Neill (NZL)	Horue Taufa (TAH)	
−67 kg	Noelyne Hetana (PNG)	Zhanna Sattsaeva (NZL)	Emily Margaret Kwoaetolo (SOL)	
−73 kg	Nicole Men (AUS)	Samantha Kassman (PNG)	Tokataake Mwemweata (KIR)	
−73 kg	Nicole Men (AUS)	Samantha Kassman (PNG)	Venice Traill (FIJ)	
+73 kg	Moehau Faaite (TAH)	Tassya Stevens (AUS)	Rhoda Bina (PNG)	
+73 kg	Moehau Faaite (TAH)	Tassya Stevens (AUS)	Ilaisaane Moala (TON)	
Team	Tahiti	Papua New Guinea	N/A	

== See also ==
- Taekwondo at the Pacific Games
