= Taekwondo at the 2014 Asian Games – Men's 74 kg =

Taekwondo competition

Men's 74 kg at the 2014 Asian Games
- Venue: Ganghwa Dolmens Gymnasium
- Date: 30 September 2014
- Competitors: 20 from 20 nations

Medalists
gold medal	Masoud Hajji-Zavareh	Iran
silver medal	Nikita Rafalovich	Uzbekistan
bronze medal	Song Young-geon	South Korea
bronze medal	Samuel Morrison	Philippines

The men's lightweight (74 kilograms) event at the 2014 Asian Games took place on 30 September 2014 at Ganghwa Dolmens Gymnasium, Incheon, South Korea.

== Schedule ==
All times are Korea Standard Time (UTC+09:00)

Date	Time	Event
Tuesday, 30 September 2014	09:30	Round of 32
Tuesday, 30 September 2014	09:30	Round of 16
Tuesday, 30 September 2014	15:30	Quarterfinals
Tuesday, 30 September 2014	15:30	Semifinals
Tuesday, 30 September 2014	18:00	Final

== Results ==
Legend

- R — Won by referee stop contest
- W — Won by withdrawal

=== Final ===
Final
Nikita Rafalovich (UZB)	2
Masoud Hajji-Zavareh (IRI)	3

=== Top half ===
Round of 32
Song Young-geon (KOR)	12
Hani Al-Matrafi (KSA)	2
Wang Guangshuai (CHN)	7
Peerathep Sila-on (THA)	12

Round of 16
Sultan Al-Mutairi (KUW)	0
Song Young-geon (KOR)	11
Shakhriyor Karimov (TJK)	3
Anas Al-Adarbi (JOR)	13
Nikita Rafalovich (UZB)	4
Zabihullah Dawrooghbik (AFG)	1
Peerathep Sila-on (THA)	12
Ahmed Maher Saad (QAT)	8

Quarterfinals
Song Young-geon (KOR)	16
Anas Al-Adarbi (JOR)	4
Nikita Rafalovich (UZB)	13
Peerathep Sila-on (THA)	1

Semifinals
Song Young-geon (KOR)	2
Nikita Rafalovich (UZB)	12

=== Bottom half ===
Round of 32
Shaksham Karki (NEP)
Michel Samaha (LIB)	W
Wong Soi Chun (MAC)	0
Samuel Morrison (PHI)	17^{W}

Round of 16
Jaswant Singh (IND)	4
Michel Samaha (LIB)	1
Masoud Hajji-Zavareh (IRI)	6
Dương Thanh Tâm (VIE)	0
Akbar Aitakhunov (KGZ)	11
Somsanouk Phommavanh (LAO)	9
Samuel Morrison (PHI)	10
Yerzhan Abylkas (KAZ)	9

Quarterfinals
Jaswant Singh (IND)	0
Masoud Hajji-Zavareh (IRI)	8
Akbar Aitakhunov (KGZ)	6
Samuel Morrison (PHI)	19

Semifinals
Masoud Hajji-Zavareh (IRI)	5^{R}
Samuel Morrison (PHI)	1
