= Uzoamaka Otuadinma =

Nigerian taekwondo practitioner

Personal information
- Full name: Uzoamaka Otuadinma
- Nationality: Nigerian
- Born: 18 December 1990 (age 35)

Sport
- Sport: Taekwondo
Medal record
Women's taekwondo
Representing Nigeria
African Games
Gold medal – first place	2015 Brazzaville	– 73 kg
Bronze medal – third place	2019 Rabat	– 73 kg
Korea Open
Silver medal – second place	2015 Chuncheon	+73 kg
Nigeria Open
Gold medal – first place	2019 Abuja	73 kg

Uzoamaka Otuadinma (born 18 December 1990) is a Nigerian taekwondo practitioner. She competes in the 73 kg event and has won a gold medal at the Taekwondo African Games and a bronze medal at the 2019 edition held in Rabat.

== Career ==
At the 2014 Commonwealth Taekwondo Championship held in Edinburgh, she won a bronze medal. The following year, she participated in the 2015 African Games in Brazzaville and she won a gold medal in the Women's Middleweight - 73 kg event.

At the 2016 Olympic Games qualification Africa held in Agadir, she won a bronze medal in the +67 kg event. In the 2017 Korea Open at Chuncheon and 2019 Nigeria Open at Abuja, she won a silver. At the 2019 Nigeria Open held I Abuja, she won a gold medal. At the 2019 African Games held in Rabat, she represented Nigeria and won a bronze medal.
