= 2024 European Taekwondo Championships – Men's 80 kg =

Men's 80 kg at the 2024 European Taekwondo Championships
- Venue: Belgrade Fair – Hall 1
- Location: Belgrade, Serbia
- Dates: 11 May
- Competitors: 19 from 19 nations

Medalists
gold medal	Toni Kanaet	Croatia
silver medal	Kostiantyn Kostenevych	Ukraine
bronze medal	Nedžad Husić	Bosnia and Herzegovina
bronze medal	Maksim Khramtsov

The men's 80 kg competition at the 2024 European Taekwondo Championships was held on 11 May 2024.

== Results ==
=== Finals ===
Semifinals
Maksim Khramtsov (AIN)	1
Kostiantyn Kostenevych (UKR)	2
Toni Kanaet (CRO)	2
Nedžad Husić (BIH)	0

Final
Kostiantyn Kostenevych (UKR)	0
Toni Kanaet (CRO)	2

=== Top half ===
==== Section 1 ====
Round of 32
Ioannis Papadopoulos (GRE)	2
Ilia Ruderman (ISR)	0

Round of 16
Simone Alessio (ITA)	2
Ioannis Papadopoulos (GRE)	0
Mihai Cristescu (ROU)	1
Maksim Khramtsov (AIN)	2

Quarterfinals
Simone Alessio (ITA)	0
Maksim Khramtsov (AIN)	2

==== Section 2 ====
Round of 16
Kostiantyn Kostenevych (UKR)	2
Ryan Doyle (IRL)	0
Aris Stylianidis (CYP)	0
Rustam Odinaev (SRB)	2

Quarterfinals
Kostiantyn Kostenevych (UKR)	2
Rustam Odinaev (SRB)	1

=== Bottom half ===
==== Section 3 ====
Round of 32
Mehmet Kani Polat (TUR)	2
Tiago Alves (POR)	0

Round of 16
Edi Hrnic (DEN)	2
Mehmet Kani Polat (TUR)	0
Albert Ludwig (CZE)	0
Toni Kanaet (CRO)	2

Quarterfinals
Edi Hrnic (DEN)	0
Toni Kanaet (CRO)	2

==== Section 4 ====
Round of 32
Muhammed Akbabaoz (RTA)
Nicolai Elenin (MDA)

Round of 16
Nedžad Husić (BIH)	2
Eltaj Gafarov (AZE)	0
Muhammed Akbabaoz (RTA)	0
Jon Cintado (ESP)	2

Quarterfinals
Nedžad Husić (BIH)	2
Jon Cintado (ESP)	0
