= Nardos Chifra =

Ethiopian taekwondo practitioner (born 1998)

Personal information
- Full name: Nardos Sisay Chifra
- Born: 18 January 1998 (age 28)

Sport
- Country: Ethiopia
- Sport: Taekwondo
Medal record
Representing Ethiopia
African Games
Gold medal – first place	2015 Brazzaville	−46 kg

Nardos Sisay Chifra (born 18 January 1998) is an Ethiopian taekwondo practitioner. In 2015, she represented Ethiopia at the 2015 African Games held in Brazzaville, Republic of the Congo and she won the gold medal in the women's −46 kg event.

At the 2016 African Taekwondo Olympic Qualification Tournament held in Agadir, Morocco, she won one of the bronze medals in the women's −49 kg event.

In 2019, she represented Ethiopia at the 2019 African Games in the women's −49 kg event without winning a medal.
