= Ester Uzoukwu =

Nigerian taekwondo practitioner

Personal information
- Full name: Ester Uzoukwu
- Nationality: Nigeria
- Born: Nigeria

Sport
- Sport: Taekwondo
- Event: 73 kg
Medal record
Women's Taekwondo
Representing Nigeria
All-African Games
| Silver medal – second place | 2015 Brazzaville | 73 kg |

Ester Uzoukwu is a Nigerian taekwondo practitioner who competes in the women's senior category. She won a silver medal at the 2015 All-Africa Games in the 73 kg category.

== Sports career ==
Ester Uzoukwu won a silver medal at the 2015 All-Africa Games held in Brazzaville, Republic of the Congo. She participated in the 73 kg event.
