= Jack Marton =

Australian taekwondo practitioner

Personal information
- Born: 7 July 1992 (age 33)

Sport
- Country: Australia
- Sport: Taekwondo
- Coached by: Karim Dighou
Medal record
Men's taekwondo
Representing Australia
Pacific Games
Gold medal – first place	2015 Port Moresby	74 kg
Gold medal – first place	2019 Apia	80 kg

Jack Marton (born 7 July 1992) is an Australian taekwondo practitioner. He won the gold medal in the men's 74 kg event at the 2015 Pacific Games held in Port Moresby, Papua New Guinea. He repeated this in 2019 with the gold medal in the men's 80 kg event at the 2019 Pacific Games held in Apia, Samoa.

== Career ==
In 2013, Marton competed in the men's lightweight event at the 2013 World Taekwondo Championships held in Puebla, Mexico and in 2015, he competed in the men's lightweight event at the 2015 World Taekwondo Championships held in Chelyabinsk, Russia.

Marton qualified to represent Australia at the 2020 Summer Olympics in Tokyo, Japan after winning the men's 80 kg event at the 2020 Oceania Taekwondo Olympic Qualification Tournament held in Gold Coast, Australia. In the final, he defeated Alexander Allen of Guam. At the 2020 Summer Olympics, Marton competed in the men's 80 kg event where he was eliminated in his first match by eventual bronze medalist Seif Eissa of Egypt.

== Achievements ==
Year	Tournament	Place	Weight class
2015	Pacific Games	1st	74 kg
2019	Pacific Games	1st	80 kg
