= Andrea Kilday =

New Zealand taekwondo practitioner

Personal information
- Born: 5 August 1982 (age 43)

Sport
- Country: New Zealand
- Sport: Taekwondo
Medal record
Women's taekwondo
Representing New Zealand
Pacific Games
Gold medal – first place	2015 Port Moresby	-46 kg

Andrea Kilday (born 5 August 1982) is a female Taekwondo fighter from Auckland, New Zealand.

She won gold at the 2015 Pacific Games.

At the 2016 Oceania Taekwondo Olympic Qualification Tournament, Kilday won gold to qualify to compete at the 2016 Olympics. She qualified for the 2008 Olympics, but was not ultimately selected to compete.
