= Caroline Marton =

Australian taekwondo practitioner

Personal information
- Nationality: Australia
- Born: 14 April 1984 (age 42)

Sport
- Sport: Taekwondo
Medal record
Women's taekwondo
Representing Australia
Pacific Games
Gold medal – first place	2015 Port Moresby	-53 kg
- Updated on 24 August 2016

Caroline Marton (born 14 April 1984) is an Australian taekwondo athlete from Melbourne, Australia.

In attempting to qualify for the 2012 Olympics she was disqualified in the final match with seconds remaining.

She won the 2016 Oceania Taekwondo Olympic Qualification Tournament as the only competitor in her weight class and therefore is qualified to compete at the 2016 Olympics.

She is the sister of world taekwondo champion Carmen Marton. She and her sister are training partners.
