= Rıdvan Baygut =

Turkish taekwondo practitioner

Personal information
- Nationality: Turkish
- Born: 3 March 1985 (age 41) Turkey
- Education: Sakarya University
- Height: 1.81 m (5.9 ft)
- Weight: 72 kg (159 lb)

Sport
- Country: Turkey
- Sport: Taekwondo
- Event: Lightweight
- Club: Tuzla Belediyespor
Medal record
Men's Taekwondo
Representing Turkey
World Championships
Bronze medal – third place	2011 Gyeongju	74 kg
European Championships
Gold medal – first place	2008 Rome	74 kg
Gold medal – first place	2010 St. Petersburg	74 kg
Silver medal – second place	2012 Manchester	74 kg

Rıdvan Baygut (born 3 March 1985) is a Turkish taekwondo athlete. He won gold medals at the 2008 and 2010 European Taekwondo Championships.

== Career ==
Baygut began practicing taekwondo at a young age and has been a member of Tuzla Belediyespor Club in Istanbul since 1997. He graduated from Sakarya University with a degree in physical education and sports.

Baygut won the gold medal at the 2008 European Taekwondo Championships in Rome in the men's lightweight (–72 kg) category. He became European champion again at the 2010 European Taekwondo Championships in St. Petersburg, Russia (–74 kg). At the 2012 European Taekwondo Championships in Manchester, he won the silver medal in the same division.

He also won a bronze medal at the 2011 World Taekwondo Championships held in Gyeongju, South Korea. In 2009, he represented Turkey at the Summer Universiade in Belgrade, Serbia.

Throughout his career, Baygut has achieved multiple Turkish national championships and numerous podium finishes at international competitions.
