= Rhythim (musician) =

Nigerian-American singer and former taekwondo athlete

- Born: Samson Nduka Edwin; 5 May 1995 (age 30); Delta State
- Genres: Afrobeats
- Occupations: Singer; record label executive
- Years active: (2018 –present)
- Website: rhythimmusicfactory.com

Samson Nduka Edwin known professionally as Rhythim is a Nigerian-American singer, songwriter, record label executive and former taekwondo athlete representing Team Nigeria.

== Life and career ==
Samson Nduka Edwin was born on 5 May 1995 in Delta State, Nigeria to a Nigerian soldier but was raised in Lagos State. He studied geography from Ibrahim Badamasi Babangida University. Rhythim began his career as a taekwondo athlete for the Nigeria Taekwondo Federation representing Nigeria in the 2015 African Games, 2016 Summer Olympics, 2016 African Championships and the captain of the Nigerian team for 2017 World Taekwondo Championships in Muju, South Korea.

As a child, Rhythim grew up listening to mainly Fela Kuti, Victor Uwaifo, Tony Allen, Bright Chimezie and Osita Osadebe which helped shape his career as an Afrobeats singer. Rhythim was a member of a child singing group called Young Singers in church.

In 2018, Rhythim relocated to the US to pursue his music career. From 2021 to 2022, Rhythim have released three extended plays; Play, Naijarated, Afrobeats & Jollof. which were inspired by the Nigerian culture and food.

== Discography ==
Singles

- "On Me"

Extended plays

- Play Play
- Naijarated
- Afrobeats & Jollof
