= Maksim Khramtsov (taekwondo) =

Russian taekwondo practitioner

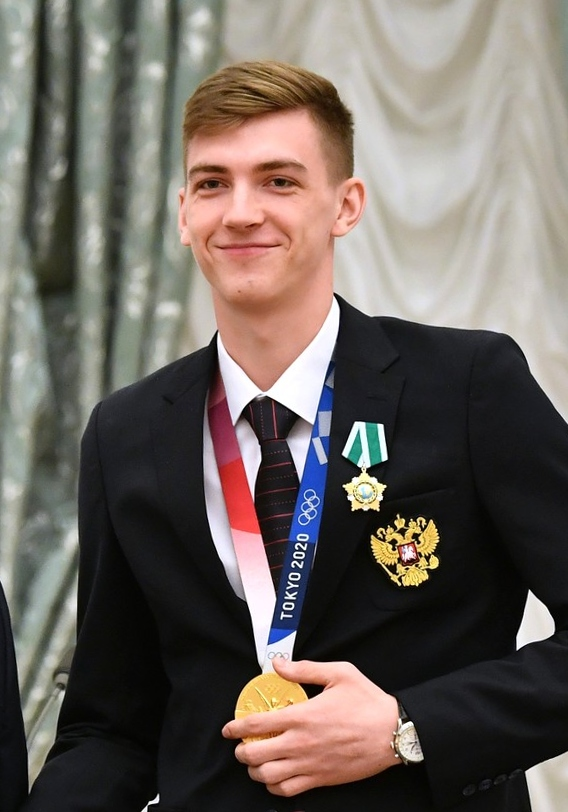
- Khramtsov in 2021

Personal information
- Nationality: (Russia) Russian
- Born: January 12, 1998 (age 28) Kurgan, Kurgan Oblast, Russia
- Education: Nizhnevartovsk State University
- Height: 194 cm (6 ft 4 in)

Sport
- Country: Russia
- Sport: Taekwondo
- Event: –80 kg
- Club: Central Sports Army Club; Nizhnevartovsk Olympic Sports School
- Coached by: Alexander Lashpanov
Medal record
Representing (Russia) ROC
Olympic Games
Gold medal – first place	2020 Tokyo	80 kg
Representing Russia
World Championships
Gold medal – first place	2017 Muju	74 kg
Grand Slam
Gold medal – first place	2017 Wuxi	80 kg
Gold medal – first place	2018 Wuxi	80 kg
Gold medal – first place	2019 Wuxi	80 kg
Grand Prix
Gold medal – first place	2018 Rome	80 kg
Gold medal – first place	2018 Moscow	80 kg
Gold medal – first place	2018 Taoyuan	80 kg
Gold medal – first place	2019 Rome	80 kg
Gold medal – first place	2019 Moscow	80 kg
Silver medal – second place	2017 London	80 kg
Silver medal – second place	2017 Abidjan	80 kg
Silver medal – second place	2018 Fujairah	80 kg
Silver medal – second place	2019 Chiba	80 kg
Bronze medal – third place	2015 Moscow	68 kg
European Championships
Gold medal – first place	2018 Kazan	80 kg
Gold medal – first place	2021 Sofia	80 kg
Military World Games
Gold medal – first place	2019 Wuhan	80 kg
European Junior Championships
Gold medal – first place	2015 Daugavpils	68 kg
European Under 21 Championships
Gold medal – first place	2015 Bukarest	68 kg
Gold medal – first place	2016 Grozny	74 kg
Representing Individual Neutral Athletes
European Championships
Bronze medal – third place	2024 Belgrade	80 kg

Maksim Sergeyevich Khramtsov (Russian: Максим Сергеевич Храмцов, IPA: [mɐˈksʲim xrɐmˈtsof]; born 12 January 1998), sometimes spelled as Khramtcov, is a male Russian Taekwondo practitioner who won gold medals at the 2020 Summer Olympics and the 2017 World Taekwondo Championships. Khramtsov initially trained in karate, but in 2011 changed to taekwondo because he wanted to compete at the Olympics.

Khramtsov was among the two Russian athletes barred from entering the 2023 World Taekwondo Championships due to his explicit support for the Russian invasion of Ukraine. In October 2022, nine months after the beginning of the 2022 Russian invasion of Ukraine, Khramtsov shot and published a video in which he congratulated Putin on his birthday and said he is proud to support him. His post on VK also included pro-war hashtags #ZaПрезидента, #ZaМир, #ZaРоссию.

Khramtsov initially qualified for the 2024 Summer Olympics as an Individual Neutral Athlete (AIN), but the International Olympic Committee did not declare him neutral and he was not invited to the Games as a result.

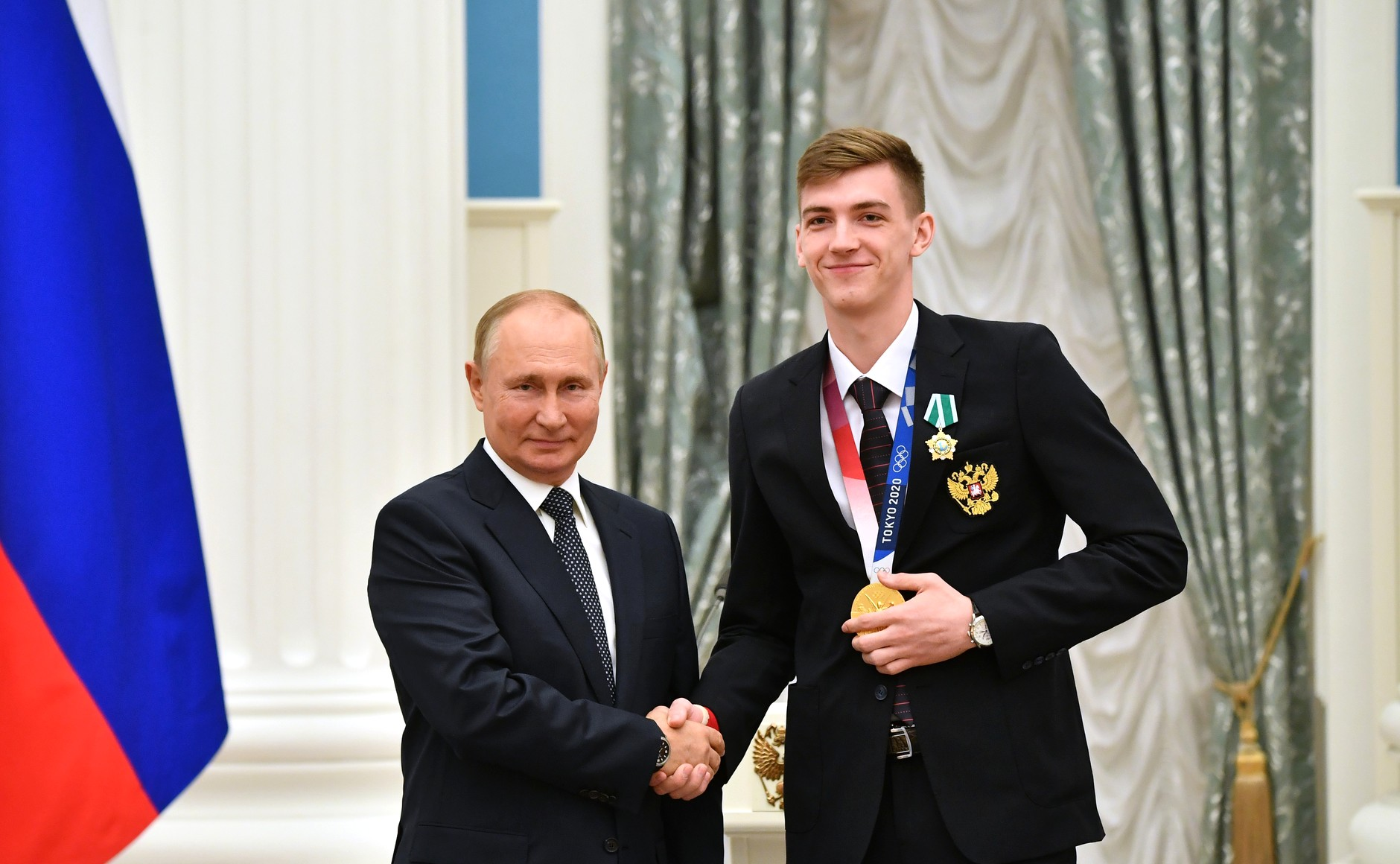
Khramtsov meeting Vladimir Putin at the Kremlin in 2021
