= Alireza Nasr Azadani =

Iranian taekwondo practitioner

Medal record

Men's taekwondo

Representing Iran

World Championships
Gold medal – first place	2011 Gyeongju	74 kg

Asian Games
Gold medal – first place	2010 Guangzhou	74 kg
Bronze medal – third place	2006 Doha	67 kg

Asian Championships
Gold medal – first place	2008 Luoyang	72 kg
Gold medal – first place	2012 Ho Chi Minh City	68 kg
Silver medal – second place	2014 Tashkent	74 kg

Universiade
Gold medal – first place	2009 Belgrade	72 kg
Silver medal – second place	2007 Bangkok	72 kg

World Combat Games
Gold medal – first place	2013 St. Petersburg	Team

Alireza Nasr Azadani (Persian: علیرضا نصر آزادانی, born September 21, 1985, in Isfahan, Iran) is an Iranian taekwondo practitioner. He won the gold medal in the lightweight division (-74 kg) at the 2011 World Taekwondo Championships in Gyeongju, South Korea.
