= Masoud Hajji-Zavareh =

Iranian taekwondo practitioner

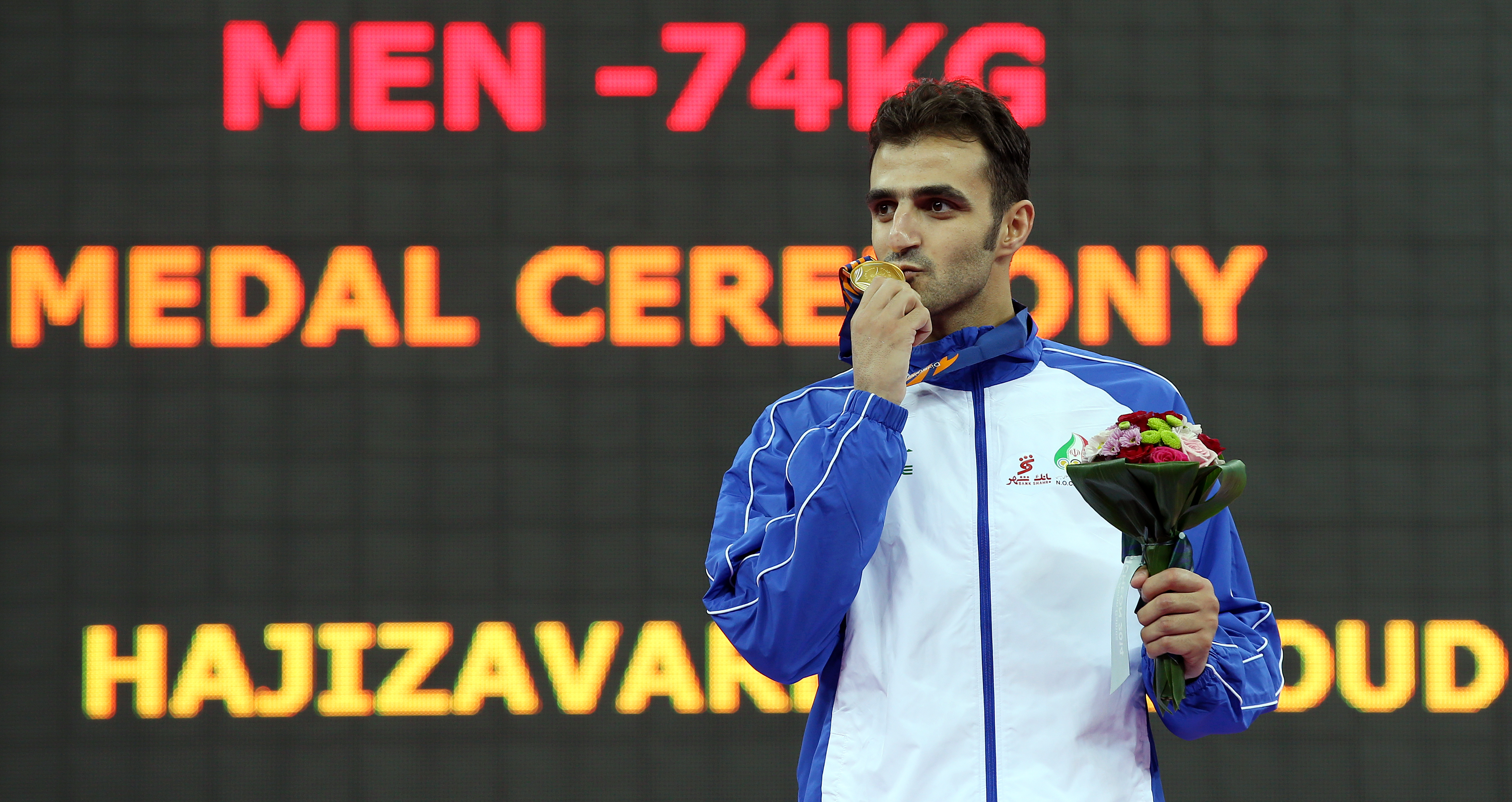

Medal record

Men's taekwondo

Representing Iran

World Championships
| Gold medal – first place | 2015 Chelyabinsk | 74 kg |
| Bronze medal – third place | 2017 Muju | 74 kg |

Asian Games
| Gold medal – first place | 2014 Incheon | 74 kg |

Asian Championships
| Gold medal – first place | 2010 Astana | 80 kg |
| Silver medal – second place | 2012 Ho Chi Minh City | 80 kg |

World Combat Games
| Gold medal – first place | 2010 Beijing | 80 kg |
| Gold medal – first place | 2013 St. Petersburg | Team |

Masoud Hajji-Zavareh (Persian: مسعود حجی زواره, born May 16, 1988, in Kermanshah, Iran) is an Iranian taekwondo practitioner. He won the gold medal in the lightweight division (74 kg) at the 2014 Asian Games in Incheon, South Korea.
