= Manuel Mark =

Austrian taekwondo practitioner

Medal record

Men's Taekwondo

Representing Austria

European Championships
Silver medal – second place	2010 St. Petersburg	Lightweight
Silver medal – second place	2008 Rome	Lightweight

Manuel Mark (born 10 November 1985) is an Austrian taekwondo athlete.
