= Samantha Kassman =

Papua New Guinean taekwondo practitioner

Personal information
- Born: January 23, 1984 (age 42)
- Height: 1.65 m (5 ft 5 in)
- Weight: 68 kg (150 lb)

Sport
- Country: Papua New Guinea
- Sport: Taekwondo
- Event: Women +67kg
Medal record
Women's taekwondo
Representing Papua New Guinea
Pacific Games
Silver medal – second place	2015 Port Moresby	-73 kg

Samantha Kassman (born 23 January 1984) is a taekwondo athlete from Papua New Guinea.

In 2015, she earned a silver medal at 73 kg at the 2015 Pacific Games.

Kassman qualified for the 2016 Olympics. This slot was earned uncontested as the four anticipated competitors in her division did not arrive to compete. She entered the Olympics ranked 99th in her weight class - the second lowest overall competing the in Olympics and only above Tripartite Commission entrant Nisha Rawal. At the Olympics, she was defeated by Bianca Walkden in the first round. She was the flag bearer for Papua New Guinea during the closing ceremony.

She is aunt of fellow 2016 Olympic taekwondo qualifier Maxemillion Kassman.

She also serves as secretary for the national federation.
