= Kim Hun =

South Korean taekwondo fighter

Kim Hun (born April 4, 1992) is a South Korean taekwondo fighter. He won a silver medal at the 2013 World Taekwondo Championships, a gold medal at the 2015 Moscow Grand prix, and a bronze medal at the 2015 Manchester Grand prix.
