= Marc Mbombo =

Congolese Taekwondo practitioner

Marc Mbombo Koda
Personal information
- Nationality: congolese
- Born: 10/11/1992 Kinshasa
- Height: 1.98 cm (1 in)
- Weight: 68 kg (150 lb)

Sport
- Country: Democratic Republic of Congo
- Sport: Taekwondo
- Team: DRCongo léopard taekwondo
Medal record
Representing Democratic Republic of the Congo
Men's taekwondo
African Games
Bronze medal – third place	2015 Brazzaville	-68 kg

Marc Mbombo Koda is a Democratic Republic of the Congo athlete and Taekwondo practitioner. He represented the DRC at the 2015 All-Africa Games, competing in the Taekwondo men's featherweight (-68 kg) category, in which he won the bronze medal. He also took part in several other regional tournaments.
