= Ilkin Shahbazov =

Azerbaijani taekwondo practitioner

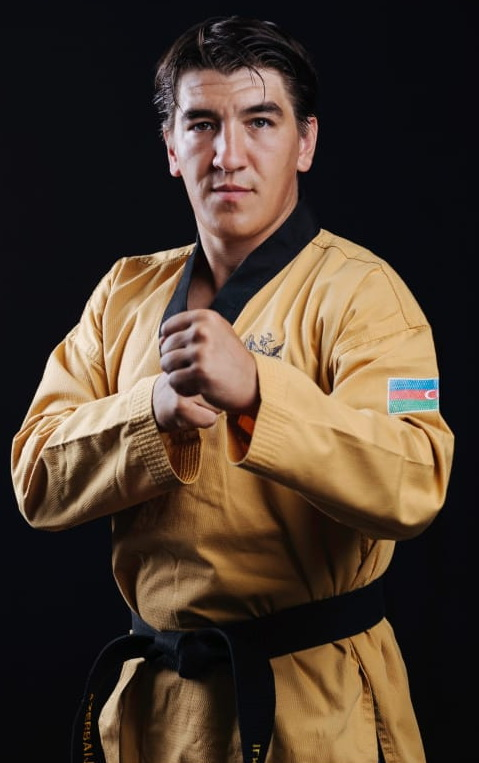

Medal record

Men's taekwondo

Representing Azerbaijan

European Championships
Gold medal – first place	2006 Bonn	Bantamweight
Silver medal – second place	2008 Rome	Featherweight
Bronze medal – third place	2014 Baku	Lightweight

Ilkin Shahbazov (Azerbaijani: İlkin Şahbazov, born 8 November 1986) is an Azerbaijani taekwondo athlete. 2x European Champion (2003; 2006), 1x Vice-European Champion (2008), 1x bronze medalist of World Cup Championship (2009) and 1x bronze medalist of European Championship (2014).

== Life and career ==
Ilkin Shahbazov was born on 8 November 1986, in Baku. 1993-2004 he studied at the secondary school No. 190 in Baku. Since 1998 he started practicing taekwondo. In 2000, he won a gold medal at the youth championship in Minsk, Belarus. He became the Republic Champion for the first time in 2001. Overall, he attained title of Republic Champion for 14 times. In 2003, He won a gold medal at the European Youth Championship held in Athene, Greece. He was admitted to Azerbaijan State Academy of Physical Education and Sport in 2004. In 2006, he a won gold medal at the European Taekwondo Championship with the highest score in Bonn, Germany. At the same year, he was entitled to “Sportsperson of the Year” and received an apartment as a gift by Ilham Aliyev, President of Azerbaijan Republic. He won a silver medal at the European Championship in Rome, Italy in 2008. At the same year, he was graduated from the university and joined to Military Service. He achieved 2nd place at the World Cup held in Baku in 2009. He won bronze medal at the European Championship in Baku, Azerbaijan. He started his career as a coach in 2015. He ended his fighter career and founded Taekwondo Club titled “Umid” in 2016. He was appointed to Head Coach to national junior team of Azerbaijan Taekwondo Federation. As a result of his successful coaching, his trainees achieved gold and bronze medals at the European Champianchip in 2019. He is the 4th Dan Black Belt holder.

Married and has two children.
