= Nozizwe Mbombo =

South African politician

Member of the National Assembly
- In office June 1999 – May 2009

Personal details
- Citizenship: South Africa
- Party: African National Congress

Nozizwe Diana Mbombo is a South African politician who represented the African National Congress (ANC) in the National Assembly from 1999 to 2009. She was elected in the 1999 general election, representing the Gauteng constituency, and she was re-elected in 2004 on the ANC's national list.
