= Maxemillion Kassman =

Papua New Guinean taekwondo practitioner

Personal information
- Born: July 17, 1998 (age 27)
- Height: 1.75 m (5 ft 9 in)
- Weight: 62 kg (137 lb)

Sport
- Country: Papua New Guinea
- Sport: Taekwondo
- Event: Men -68kg
Medal record
Pacific Games
Bronze medal – third place	2015 Port Moresby	-58 kg

Maxemillion Kassman (born 17 July 1998) is a taekwondo athlete from Papua New Guinea.

Kassman has qualified for the 2016 Olympics.

He is the nephew of fellow 2016 Olympic taekwondo qualifier Samantha Kassman.
