= Albert Gaun =

Russian taekwondo practitioner

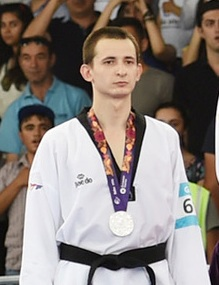
- Gaun in 2015

Personal information
- Nationality: Russian
- Born: 21 June 1992 (age 34) Barnaul, Russian SFSR
- Height: 188 cm (6 ft 2 in)

Sport
- Country: Russia
- Sport: Taekwondo
- Event: Lightweight (74 kg)
Medal record
Men's taekwondo
Representing Russia
World Championships
Silver medal – second place	2013 Puebla	Lightweight
Bronze medal – third place	2015 Chelyabinsk	Lightweight
European Championships
Gold medal – first place	2014 Baku	Lightweight
European Games
Silver medal – second place	2015 Baku	80 kg
Grand Prix
Silver medal – second place	2013 Manchester	-80 kg
Silver medal – second place	2014 Suzhou	-80 kg
Gold medal – first place	2014 Querétaro	-80 kg
Bronze medal – third place	2016 Baku	-80 kg
European Junior Championships
Silver medal – second place	2009 Trelleborg	-73 kg

Albert Aleksandrovich Gaun (Russian: Альберт Александрович Гаун; born 21 June 1992 in Barnaul) is a Russian taekwondo practitioner.
