= Safwan Khalil =

Australian taekwondo practitioner

Medal record

Representing Australia

Men's taekwondo

Universiade
| Gold medal – first place | 2011 Shenzhen | Flyweight |

Pacific Games
| Gold medal – first place | 2015 Port Moresby | Flyweight |

Safwan Khalil (born 15 May 1986 in Tripoli, Lebanon) is a taekwondo athlete from Australia. He competed at the London Olympics in the 58 kg division, losing in a bronze medal match against Alexey Denisenko. Born in Tripoli, Lebanon, he has lived in Australia since he was a child, attending Lurnea High School in south-western Sydney and training at his brother's gym, Global Martial Arts. His brother Ali Khalil, is also his coach, and the Australian Olympic coach for 2012.

Khalil is engaged to fellow Olympic taekwondo athlete Carmen Marton. The couple were married under Islamic law (but not under Australian civil law) prior to the London Olympics in 2012.

Khalil qualified for the Rio 2016 Olympics, which will be his second Olympics as a competitor.

Khalil qualified for the Tokyo 2020 Olympics. In the men's 58 kg event in the round of 16, he lost to Ramnarong Sawekwiharee 23-7 and therefore did not advance any further in the competition. Australia at the 2020 Summer Olympics details the results in depth.
