= Carmen Marton =

Australian taekwondo practitioner

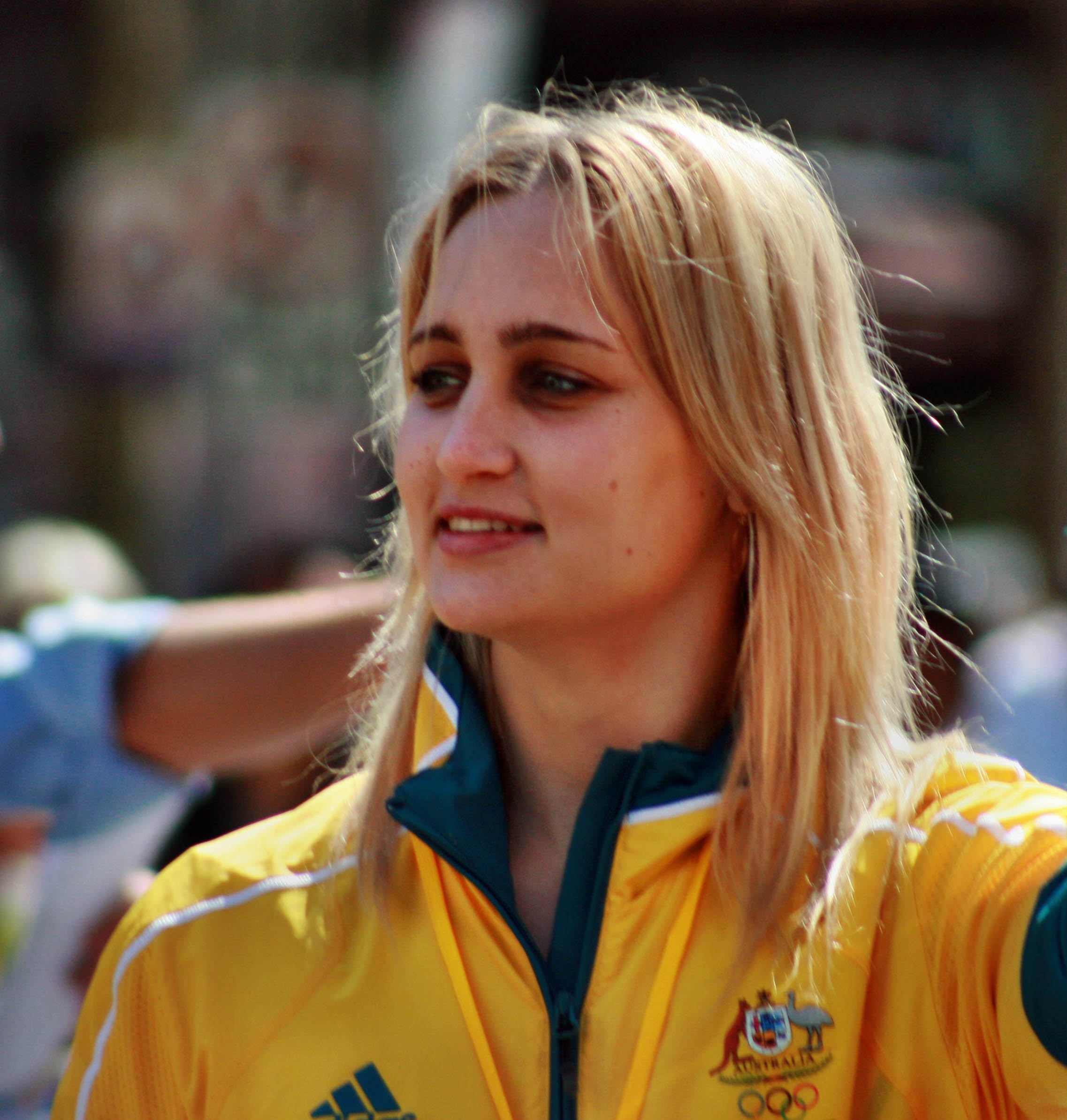

Personal information
- Born: 30 June 1986 (age 40) Melbourne, Australia
- Height: 1.72 m (5 ft 8 in)
Medal record
Women's taekwondo
Representing Australia
World Championships
Gold medal – first place	2013 Puebla	Lightweight
Bronze medal – third place	2005 Madrid	Lightweight
Summer Universiade
Bronze medal – third place	2011 Shenzhen	Lightweight
Pacific Games
Gold medal – first place	2015 Port Moresby	Lightweight

Carmen Marton (born 30 June 1986) is an Australian taekwondo athlete. She is Australia's first ever world taekwondo champion.

Marton is of Polish Australian descent, since her parents were born in Poland and came to Australia as refugees. Her parents, siblings and partner have all been taekwondo athletes.

== Career ==
As a junior, Marton achieved a number of international benchmark results:

- She won silver at both the 2001 and 2003 Junior Asian Championships.
- At the age of 14 she became the youngest athlete from Australia to win selection on a senior National Team when she took part in the Taekwondo World Cup in Vietnam.
- At the age of 15 she secured a spot on her first senior National Team competing at the 2001 World Championships in Jeju, South Korea.
- In 2002, at the age of 16 she won a silver medal at the World Cup in Tokyo, Japan in the <59 kg category.
- In 2004, she won a bronze at the Asian Championships Seoul, South Korea, in the <63 kg category.
- Missing out on the 2004 Athens Olympics, she backed her disappointment with a bronze medal at the 2005 World Taekwondo Championships in the Lightweight (up to 63 kg) division.
- Marton then won a Bronze at the Olympic Test event in 2007 in the +67 kg weight category.

She has also competed in the 2007 World Taekwondo Championships competing in the bantamweight and welterweight, winning two fights, the 2009 World Taekwondo Championships finishing in the round of 16, and the 2011 World Taekwondo Championships in the lightweight division, losing to Marina Sumić in the quarter-finals

Marton secured a bronze at the 2011 Universiade Games in Shenzhen, China. In September 2011 she secured the under 67 kg division for Australia at the Oceania Olympic Qualification Tournament. She won, and competed in the 2008 Olympics in the +67 kg category, losing to Natália Falavigna in the quarterfinals.

Marton won the women's lightweight gold medal at the 2013 World Taekwondo Championships, becoming Australia's first ever world taekwondo champion, after breaking the tied scores and defeating South Korean Kim Huy Lan with just 4 seconds left on the clock.

Marton, her partner, brother and sister all won Gold in Taekwondo at the 2015 Pacific Games.

Carmen participated in the 2016 Summer Olympics, her third Olympics as a competitor.

== Personal life ==
Marton is engaged to fellow Olympic taekwondo athlete Safwan Khalil, whom she met while she was a teenager. The pair were Australia's only taekwondo representatives at the 2012 Summer Olympics, where Marton narrowly missed out on winning a bronze medal. Marton was born and raised a Catholic, but converted to Islam in 2009. She describes her conversion as a natural progression: "[The] stories are the same [which] was really surprising to me".

Marton's father is a Polish taekwondo exponent and introduced her to the sport. She has a brother, Jack, and sister, Caroline Marton, who are also her training partners and whom she describes as world-class athletes.

She has a Bachelor of Exercise and Sport Science degree from Deakin University and was a former state volleyballer. Her personal motto is ‘hard work and ambition overtake natural ability.’
