= Hayder Shkara =

Australian taekwondo practitioner

Personal information
- Nationality: Australia
- Born: 21 May 1990 (age 36) Auburn, Australia
- Education: Homebush Boys High School, University of Technology Sydney

Sport
- Sport: Taekwondo
- Team: Australian National Team
- Coached by: Ali Khalil
- Retired: Yes

Achievements and titles
- Olympic finals: 7th
- Regional finals: 1st
- National finals: 1st
- Highest world ranking: 10th
Medal record
Men's taekwondo
Representing Australia
Pacific Games
Gold medal – first place	2015 Port Moresby	-80 kg
- Updated on 24 August 2016

Hayder Shkara (born 21 May 1990) is a former professional Taekwondo athlete now turned Australian lawyer.

== Early life ==
Shkara was introduced to martial arts at the age of 8, whilst living in Sydney. He entered the Australian national team in 2006.

From 2009 to 2017, Shkara was on the Australian National Taekwondo team and competed at the 2009 World Taekwondo Championships, 2011 World Taekwondo Championships, 2013 World Taekwondo Championships, 2015 World Taekwondo Championships and 2017 World Taekwondo Championships.

He attempted to gain selection to the London 2012 Olympic Games but failed to qualify, after a loss to Vaughn Scott.

Shkara was part of the Australian team's successful run at the 2015 Pacific Games, winning a gold medal there and claiming three bronze medals at the 2015 Polish, Russian and Serbian Opens.

At a rematch with Vaughn at an Oceania 2016 qualifying tournament, Shkara was victorious and secured entry to the 2016 Summer Olympics.

Shkara said he was not particularly good at sport as a child, but fell in love with Taekwondo. When he succeeded at qualifying for the Olympics, he said the feeling was immense.

== 2016 Summer Olympics ==
Shkara's first match was against Lutalo Muhammad of Great Britain (the eventual silver medalist). He was defeated 14-0, and suffered a broken rib.

Due to Lutalo Muhammad making the finals, Shkara was given entry to a bronze medal match against the Steven Lopez (USA).

After a sudden death round, Shkara was defeated on a count back of touches.

== Career post-retirement ==
After retiring from professional Taekwondo, Shkara began work as a lawyer practicing in Australian family law. In 2017, he started his own law firm, Justice Family Lawyers in Sydney.

In June 2022, Shkara acquired Melbourne based firm, Melbourne Family Lawyers, furthering the growth of his firm in the Victorian legal market.

Shkara said that the client base at Justice Family Lawyers had been growing in the Melbourne market, leading to the opening of a Melbourne office in 2019. At that time, Justice Family Lawyers was “in a prime position” to acquire and grow Melbourne Family Lawyers.

Shkara further expanded on his business growth by acquiring Walker Pender Group in Queensland in 2023.

Shkara has attributed his growth to adopting legal tech solutions, enhancing efficiency, enabled hybrid work, and expanded his firm's operations. His commitment to technology, strategic client care, and effective marketing has positioned his firm for sustainable growth, even in challenging times.

He has appeared on the Australian TV program Insight where he discussed prenuptial agreements with the studio audience.

He has also given talks at UNSW about family law and running successful law practices.
