= Ghofran Zaki =

Egyptian taekwondo practitioner

Personal information
- Nationality: Egyptian
- Born: 30 September 1992 (age 33)

Sport
- Sport: Taekwondo

Ghofran Zaki (born 30 September 1992) is an Egyptian taekwondo athlete.

He competed at the 2016 Summer Olympics in Rio de Janeiro, in the men's 68 kg.
