= Uriel Adriano =

Mexican taekwondo practitioner

Personal information
- Born: April 30, 1990 (age 36) Guadalajara, Mexico
- Height: 184 cm (6 ft 1/2 in)

Sport
- Country: Mexico
- Sport: Taekwondo
- Event: Lightweight (74 kg)

Achievements and titles
- World finals: 2013 Puebla
Medal record
Men's Taekwondo
Representing Mexico
World Championships
Gold medal – first place	2013 Puebla	Lightweight
Pan American Games
Bronze medal – third place	2011 Guadalajara	80 kg
- Updated on 16:24, 24 September 2013 (UTC)

Uriel Avigdor Adriano Ruiz (born April 30, 1990) is a taekwondo practitioner from Mexico. Adriano won the gold medal in the men's lightweight (under 74 kg) division at the 2013 World Taekwondo Championships in Puebla. As a lightweight (under 74 kg), he won the bronze medal at the 2011 Pan American Games in the 80 kg event. He was born in Guadalajara.
