= Samuel Morrison (taekwondo) =

Filipino taekwondo practitioner

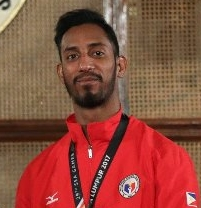
- Morrison in 2017

Personal information
- National team: Philippines
- Born: Samuel Thomas Harper Morrison; March 26, 1990 (age 36) Olongapo, Zambales, Philippines
- Height: 6 ft 1 in (185 cm)

Sport
- Country: Philippines
- Sport: Taekwondo
- Weight class: -63, -68, -74, -80kg
- University team: Tiger Jins
Medal record
Representing Philippines
| Event | 1st | 2nd | 3rd |
|---|---|---|---|
| Asian Games | 0 | 0 | 1 |
| Summer Universiade | 0 | 1 | 0 |
| Southeast Asian Games | 4 | 1 | 2 |
| Total | 4 | 2 | 3 |
Men's taekwondo
Asian Games
| Bronze medal – third place | 2014 Incheon | -74 kg |
Summer Universiade
| Silver medal – second place | 2011 Shenzhen | -68 kg |
Southeast Asian Games
| Gold medal – first place | 2023 Cambodia | -87 kg |
| Gold medal – first place | 2019 Philippines | -80 kg |
| Gold medal – first place | 2017 Kuala Lumpur | -74 kg |
| Gold medal – first place | 2015 Singapore | -68 kg |
| Silver medal – second place | 2013 Myanmar | -74 kg |
| Bronze medal – third place | 2021 Vietnam | -80 kg |
| Bronze medal – third place | 2011 Indonesia | -68 kg |
- Updated on 15 January 2026

Samuel Thomas Harper Morrison (born March 26, 1990, in Olongapo, Zambales), also known as Butch Morrison, is a Filipino taekwondo practitioner.

== Career ==
=== Early career ===
During his childhood Morrison played recreational basketball. Being an avid viewer of Power Rangers and Masked Rider, these shows influenced Morrison to take up taekwondo and he started to learn the sport in a local taekwondo gym in Olongapo.

=== Collegiate ===
Morrison attended the University of Santo Tomas and was part of the Tiger Jins, the university's taekwondo team. He won gold for UST at the UAAP in 2008. By 2011 he was reported to be a student of the Far Eastern University.

=== International ===
Morrison has competed at the world championships three times. He was a gold medalist at the 2015 Southeast Asian Games, and a bronze medalist at the 2014 Asian Games. He also won silver at the 2011 Summer Universiade.

Morrison's attempt to qualify for 2012 Summer Olympics by entering the 2011 Asian Taekwondo Olympic Qualification Tournament failed. He attributed his failure to a lack of discipline and composure amidst bad calls, as well as his opponent's tactics. Morrison's attempt to qualify for the 2016 Summer Olympics by competing at the 2016 Asian Taekwondo Olympic Qualification Tournament. also failed, although he was able to reach the Quarter finals.

He plans within 2023, after the 2023 Southeast Asian Games and 2022 Asian Games.

== Personal life ==
Morrison's father is a retired American Naval serviceman, and currently teaches history in the District of Columbia, and is based in Maryland. Morrison's mother is Filipina. Morrison has a family of his own and have a child.
