= Toni Kanaet =

Croatian taekwondo practitioner

Personal information
- Born: 4 September 1995 (age 30) Split, Croatia
- Height: 193 cm (6 ft 4 in)
- Weight: 80 kg (176 lb)

Sport
- Country: Croatia
- Sport: Taekwondo
- Event: –74kg
- Club: TK Marjan
Medal record
Representing Croatia
Men's taekwondo
Olympic Games
Bronze medal – third place	2020 Tokyo	80 kg
Grand Prix
Bronze medal – third place	2019 Chiba	80 kg
Bronze medal – third place	2018 Rome	80 kg
Bronze medal – third place	2018 Moscow	80 kg
European Championships
Gold medal – first place	2018 Kazan	74 kg
Gold medal – first place	2024 Belgrade	80 kg
Silver medal – second place	2016 Montreux	74 kg
Bronze medal – third place	2022 Manchester	80 kg

Toni Kanaet (born 4 September 1995) is a Croatian taekwondo practitioner. He won the gold medal at the 2018 European Taekwondo Championships on the - 74 kg weight category.
