= Raúl Martínez (taekwondo) =

Spanish taekwondo practitioner

Personal information
- Full name: Raúl Martínez García
- Nationality: Spanish
- Born: 27 June 1991 (age 35) Elche, Spain
- Height: 191 cm (6 ft 3 in)

Sport
- Country: Spain
- Sport: Taekwondo
- Event: 80 kg
Medal record
Men's taekwondo
Representing Spain
Grand Prix
Gold medal – first place	2018 Manchester	80 kg
Silver medal – second place	2018 Rome	80 kg
Bronze medal – third place	2017 London	80 kg
European Games
Bronze medal – third place	2023 Kraków-Małopolska	87 kg
Mediterranean Games
Gold medal – first place	2018 Tarragona	80 kg
Universiade
Silver medal – second place	2017 Taipei	80 kg

Raul Martínez Gárcia (Note: In this Spanish name, the first or paternal surname is Martínez and the second or maternal family name is Gárcia.) (born 27 June 1991 in Elche) is a Spanish taekwondo athlete. He won the gold medal at the 2018 Mediterranean Games on the Men's 80 kg weight category.

He represented Spain at the 2020 Summer Olympics in the men's 80 kg weight class.
