= Nikita Rafalovich =

Uzbekistani taekwondo practitioner

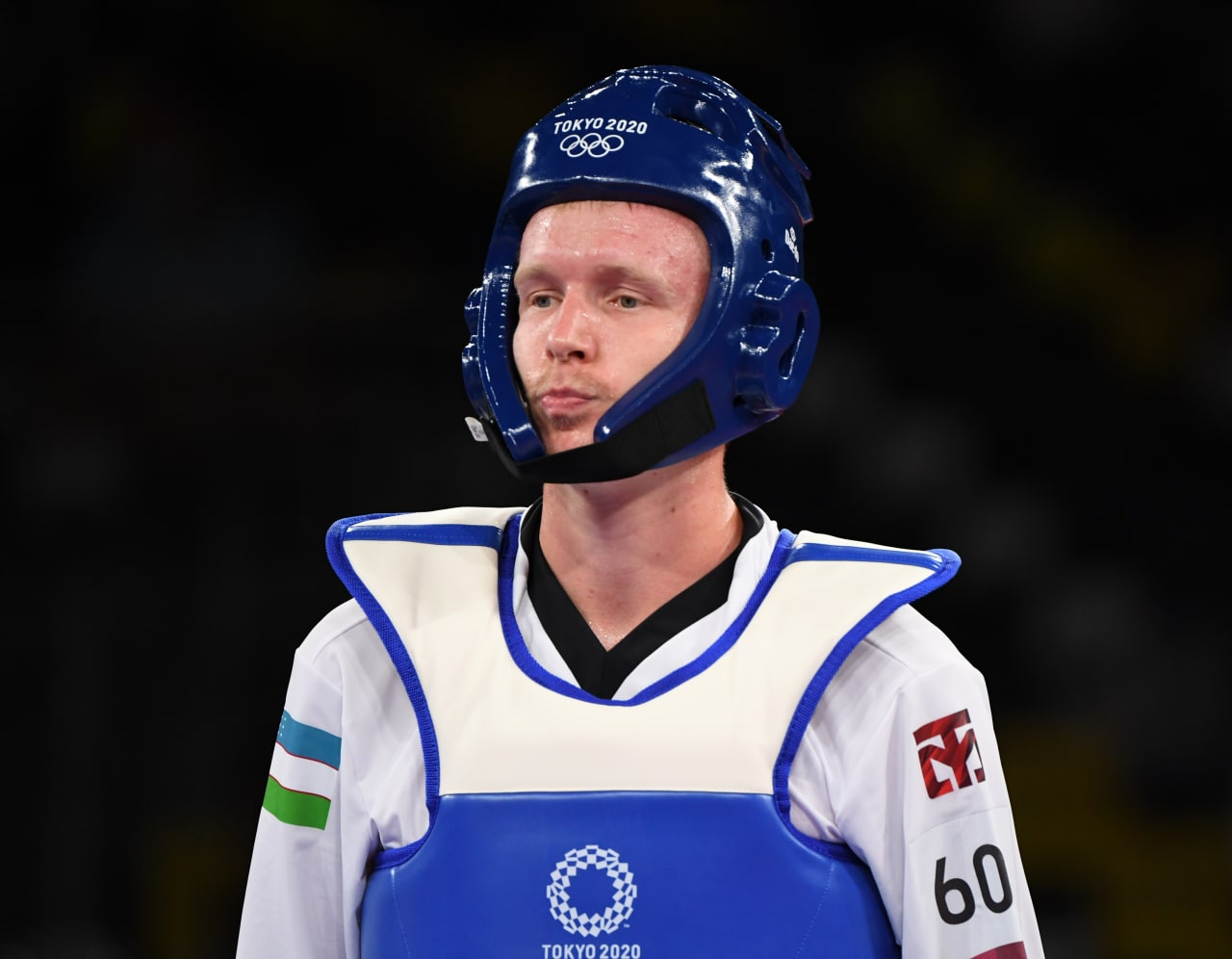

Personal information
- Nationality: Uzbekistani
- Born: Никита Игоревич Рафалович; 10 October 1993 (age 32) Tashkent, Uzbekistan
- Height: 190 cm (6 ft 3 in)
- Weight: 80 kg (176 lb)

Sport
- Sport: Taekwondo
- Club: Ilsan Taekwondo School
- Coached by: Maksim Rafalovich Alexander Kim
Medal record
Representing Uzbekistan
World Championships
Silver medal – second place	2015 Chelyabinsk	74 kg
Silver medal – second place	2017 Muju	74 kg
Bronze medal – third place	2022 Guadalajara	87 kg
Grand Prix
Silver medal – second place	2023 Rome	+80 kg
Silver medal – second place	2023 Taiyuan	+80 kg
Bronze medal – third place	2017 Abidjan	80 kg
Bronze medal – third place	2018 Moscow	80 kg
Asian Games
Gold medal – first place	2018 Jakarta	80 kg
Silver medal – second place	2014 Incheon	74 kg
Asian Championships
Gold medal – first place	2018 Ho Chi Minh City	74 kg
Gold medal – first place	2022 Chuncheon	87 kg
Silver medal – second place	2016 Manila	74 kg
Bronze medal – third place	2014 Tashkent	74 kg
Grand Slam
Bronze medal – third place	2019 Wuxi	80 kg
- Updated on 6 December 2023

Nikita Rafalovich (born 10 October 1993) is an Uzbekistani taekwondo athlete.

== Career ==
Rafalovich represented Uzbekistan at the 2016 Summer Olympics in Rio de Janeiro, in the men's 80 kg. He qualified for the 2020 Summer Olympics, also in the men's 80 kg category. He competed in the men's +80 kg category at the 2024 Summer Olympics. He is coached by his brother, Maksim Rafalovich, a former Uzbek taekwondo athlete.

== Personal life ==
Rafalovich was born in Tashkent on 10 October 1993.
