= Arnold Nkoy =

Congolese taekwondo practitioner

Arnold Nkoy Mokomo
Personal information
- Born: December 27, 1995 (age 30)

Sport
- Country: DR Congo
- Sport: Taekwondo
Medal record
Representing Democratic Republic of the Congo
Men's taekwondo
African Games
Bronze medal – third place	2015 Brazzaville	-74 kg
African Championships
Bronze medal – third place	2018 Agadir	-74 kg

Arnold Nkoy Mokomo (born 27 December 1995) is a Democratic Republic of the Congo taekwondo practitioner. He won the bronze medal at the 2015 African Games in the taekwondo men's -74 kg category and one in the same category at the 2018 African Taekwondo Championships.

== Medal record ==
African Games
Event	Location	Medal	Category
2015	Brazzaville (Republic of the Congo)	Bronze	–74 kg
African Taekwondo Championships
Event	Location	Medal	Category
2018	Agadir (Morocco)	Bronze	–74 kg
