= Júlio Ferreira =

Portuguese taekwondo practitioner

Personal information
- Nationality: Portuguese
- Born: April 29, 1994 (age 32) Braga, Portugal
- Height: 188 cm (6 ft 2 in)

Sport
- Country: Portugal
- Sport: Taekwondo
- Event: Lightweight (74 kg)
- University team: University of Minho
- Club: Sporting Clube de Braga
- Coached by: Joaquim Peixoto
Medal record
Representing Portugal
Men's taekwondo
Grand Prix
Bronze medal – third place	2018 Rome	80 kg
European Games
Bronze medal – third place	2015 Baku	80 kg
European Championships
Bronze medal – third place	2014 Innsbruck	74 kg
Gold medal – first place	2016 Montreux	74 kg
Mediterranean Games
Bronze medal – third place	2018 Tarragona	80 kg
Universiade
Bronze medal – third place	2019 Naples	74 kg
Lusophony Games
Gold medal – first place	2014 Goa	80 kg

Júlio Alexandre Bacelar Oliveira Ferreira (born 29 April 1994) is a Portuguese taekwondo practitioner from Braga, who competes in the men's –74 kg (lightweight) category. He has won multiple medals in international competitions, including gold at the 2016 European Championships and bronze at the 2015 European Games (–80 kg). In addition, he achieved a 5th place at the 2015 World Taekwondo Championships.
