= Torann Maizeroi =

French taekwondo practitioner

Personal information
- Nationality: French
- Born: 1 April 1989 (age 37) Fort-de-France, Martinique
- Height: 187 cm (6 ft 1 1/2 in)

Sport
- Country: France
- Sport: Taekwondo
- Event: Lightweight (74 kg)
- Club: A.S. Nandy
Medal record
Representing France
Men's taekwondo
European Championships
Silver medal – second place	2014 Baku	Lightweight
Bronze medal – third place	2012 Manchester	Lightweight
Universiade
Silver medal – second place	2015 Gwangju	Lightweight
Silver medal – second place	2009 Belgrade	Lightweight
Bronze medal – third place	2007 Bangkok	Lightweight

Torann Maizeroi (born 1 April 1989 in Fort-de-France, Martinique) is a French taekwondo practitioner. In the July 2015 World Taekwondo Federation world rankings, Maizeroi was ranked 6th in the -74 kg division. Torann Maizeroi has fought in 96 registered fights but he has only won 54 of them.
