= Damir Fejzić =

Serbian taekwondo practitioner

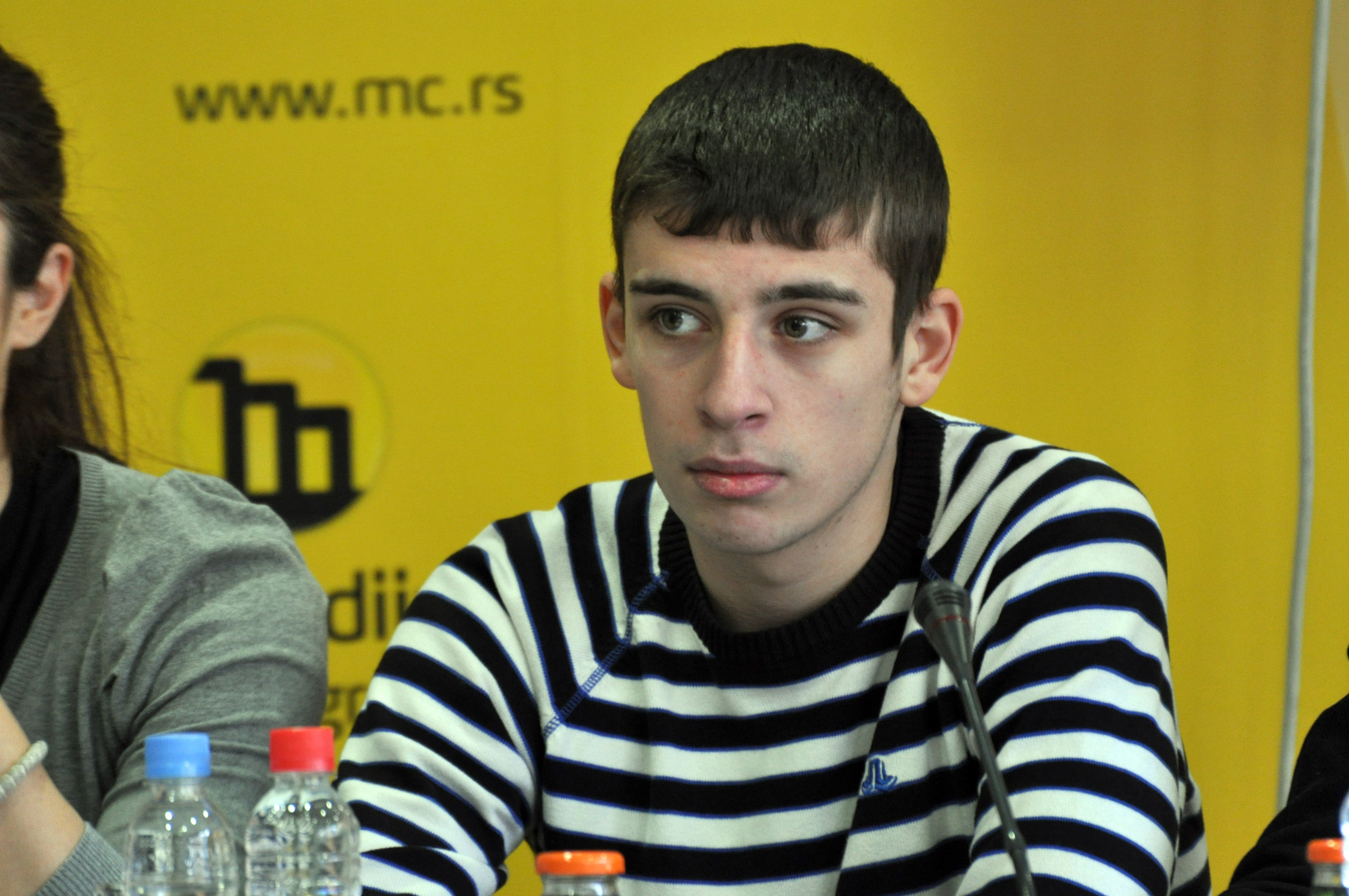

Damir Fejzic (Serbian Cyrillic: Дамир Фејзић, born 16 April 1994, in Vršac) is a Serbian taekwondo practitioner. At the 2012 Summer Olympics, he competed in the Men's 68 kg competition, reaching the quarterfinals.
