= 2022 World Taekwondo Championships – Men's lightweight =

Taekwondo competitions

Men's lightweight at the 2022 World Championships
- Venue: Centro Acuático CODE Metropolitano
- Dates: 17 November 2022
- Competitors: 57 from 55 nations

Medalists
gold medal	Daniel Quesada	Spain
silver medal	Edival Pontes	Brazil
bronze medal	Firas Katoussi	Tunisia
bronze medal	Stefan Takov	Serbia

The men's lightweight is a competition featured at the 2022 World Taekwondo Championships, and was held at the Acuático Code Metropolitano in Guadalajara, Mexico on 17 November 2022. Lightweights were limited to a maximum of 74 kilograms in body mass.

== Results ==
Legend

- DQ — Won by disqualification
- P — Won by punitive declaration

=== Finals ===
Semifinals				Final
Edival Pontes (BRA)	1	2	5
Firas Katoussi (TUN)	4	0	3	Edival Pontes (BRA)	1	4
Daniel Quesada (ESP)	0	6	6	Daniel Quesada (ESP)	5	8
Stefan Takov (SRB)	4	2	0

=== Top half ===
==== Section 1 ====
Round of 64
Oleksandr Chumachenko (UKR)	11	4	3
Kaloyan Binev (BUL)	4	5	3
Farzad Mansouri (RTA)	7	12	13
Adam Jochman (CZE)	10	0	12
Lamine Sidibé (CIV)	7	8	3
Ahmad Bahlool (PLE)	15	7	4
Muhammed Emin Yıldız (TUR)	12	0
Isiah Pollard (TTO)	5	0
~~Dewayale Gedara Darshana (SRI)~~
Arbnor Bajra (KOS)	D	Q
Zurab Kintsurashvili (GEO)	D	Q
~~Arnold Nkoy (COD)~~
Robert Zink (STP)	2	0
Badr Achab (BEL)	10	12

Round of 32
Edival Pontes (BRA)	2	9
Oleksandr Chumachenko (UKR)	2	3
Farzad Mansouri (RTA)	1	6
Ahmad Bahlool (PLE)	0	5
Muhammed Emin Yıldız (TUR)	6	4	4
Arbnor Bajra (KOS)	2	7	0
Zurab Kintsurashvili (GEO)	2	0	7
Badr Achab (BEL)	2	0	2

Round of 16
Edival Pontes (BRA)	10	4
Farzad Mansouri (RTA)	2	3
Muhammed Emin Yıldız (TUR)	3	3
Zurab Kintsurashvili (GEO)	5	10

Quarterfinals
Edival Pontes (BRA)	3	6
Zurab Kintsurashvili (GEO)	1	0

==== Section 2 ====
Round of 64
~~Kasra Mehdipournejad (RTA)~~
Cui Yang (CHN)	D	Q
Brandon Sealy (JAM)	8	12
Stefano Crescentini (SMR)	0	0
Hasanein Khafaji (IRQ)	1	3
Taeku Park (CAN)	11	10
Sebastian Thune (NOR)	1	9
Daniel Martínez (HON)	0	1
Tosh van Dijk (SUR)	3	6	3
Juan Valencia (COL)	4	3	5
Dave Cea (PHI)	6	2	5
Yasuhiro Hamada (JPN)	0	4	3

Round of 32
Firas Katoussi (TUN)	1	4
Cui Yang (CHN)	0	4
Brandon Sealy (JAM)	9	3	5
Taeku Park (CAN)	6	4	13
Sebastian Thune (NOR)	0	3	0
Juan Valencia (COL)	6	3	3
Dave Cea (PHI)	3	2
René Lizárraga (MEX)	0	1

Round of 16
Firas Katoussi (TUN)	5	9^{P}	14
Taeku Park (CAN)	5	0	2
Juan Valencia (COL)	1	2
Dave Cea (PHI)	2	10

Quarterfinals
Firas Katoussi (TUN)	2	10^{P}	10^{P}
Dave Cea (PHI)	3	0	1

=== Bottom half ===
==== Section 3 ====
Round of 64
Kelvin Calderón (CUB)	1	1
Nurkanat Kozhakhmet (KAZ)	4	3
Leroy Nsilu Dilandu (IRL)	D	Q
~~Hassan Abakar (CHA)~~
Francisco Lara (ESA)	5	0
Leon Sejranovic (AUS)	6	12
~~Mirhashem Hosseini (IRI)~~
Ilia Ruderman (ISR)	D	Q
~~Boubacar Mangue (NIG)~~
Mohamad Chehade (SWE)	D	Q
Sohwon Kim (HAI)	9	2	8
Kiel Buenaventura (USA)	5	10	5

Round of 32
Daniel Quesada (ESP)	8	3	14
Nurkanat Kozhakhmet (KAZ)	2	4	1
Leroy Nsilu Dilandu (IRL)	2	7
Leon Sejranovic (AUS)	2	16
Ilia Ruderman (ISR)	2	7
Mohamad Chehade (SWE)	7	10
Sohwon Kim (HAI)	1	2
Nedžad Husić (BIH)	14	10

Round of 16
Daniel Quesada (ESP)	9	12
Leon Sejranovic (AUS)	0	0
Mohamad Chehade (SWE)	4	3
Nedžad Husić (BIH)	9	8

Quarterfinals
Daniel Quesada (ESP)	2	10
Nedžad Husić (BIH)	2	3

==== Section 4 ====
Round of 64
Omar Dawoud (DEN)	3	0
Dimitrios Peltekis (GRE)	3	1
Lin Kovačič (SLO)	7	5
Juan Carlos Sastre (PUR)	0	3
~~Evans Oduor (KEN)~~
Jasurbek Jaysunov (UZB)	D	Q
Rami Eissa (EGY)	10	5^{P}
Maickol Orozco (DOM)	3	0
Wei Cheng-chi (TPE)	3	2	5
Eltaj Gafarov (AZE)	1	4	2
Lakchai Hauihongthong (THA)	2	4
Jang Eun-seok (KOR)	8	7

Round of 32
Stefan Takov (SRB)	6	6
Dimitrios Peltekis (GRE)	0	0
Lin Kovačič (SLO)	0	3
Jasurbek Jaysunov (UZB)	4	4
Rami Eissa (EGY)	5	5	5
Wei Cheng-chi (TPE)	0	9	2
Jang Eun-seok (KOR)	4	3	5
Marko Golubić (CRO)	3	9	7

Round of 16
Stefan Takov (SRB)	3	10
Jasurbek Jaysunov (UZB)	2	5
Rami Eissa (EGY)	3	6	11
Marko Golubić (CRO)	6	6	14

Quarterfinals
Stefan Takov (SRB)	5	9	4
Marko Golubić (CRO)	3	10	4
