= 2023 World Taekwondo Championships – Men's lightweight =

Taekwondo competitions

Men's lightweight at the 2023 World Championships
- Venue: Baku Crystal Hall
- Dates: 3 June 2023
- Competitors: 58 from 57 nations

Medalists
| gold medal | Marko Golubić | Croatia |
| silver medal | Stefan Takov | Serbia |
| bronze medal | Leon Sejranovic | Australia |
| bronze medal | Kadyrbech Daurov | Individual Neutral Athletes |

The men's lightweight is a competition featured at the 2023 World Taekwondo Championships, and was held at the Baku Crystal Hall in Baku, Azerbaijan on 3 June 2023. Lightweights were limited to a maximum of 74 kilograms in body mass.

== Results ==
Legend

- P — Won by punitive declaration

=== Finals ===
| Semifinals | | | Final |
| Leon Sejranovic (AUS) | 4 | 9 |
| Marko Golubić (CRO) | 21 | 15 | Marko Golubić (CRO) | 4 | 6 | 8 |
| Stefan Takov (SRB) | 7 | 4 | Stefan Takov (SRB) | 3 | 9 | 8 |
| Kadyrbech Daurov (AIN) | 1 | 3 |

=== Top half ===
==== Section 1 ====
Round of 64
Yiğithan Kılıç (TUR) | 1 | 9 | 6
Omar Dawoud (DEN) | 2 | 3 | 4
Juan Valencia (COL) | 12 | 8 | 9
Omid Sahak (AFG) | 10 | 9 | 10
Łukasz Cudnoch (POL) | 10 | 2 | 2
Leon Sejranovic (AUS) | 0 | 2 | 14
Vinícius Matos (BRA) | 7 | 8
Amed Sama (GHA) | 0 | 1
Kang Jae-gwon (KOR) | 12 | 4
Nurkanat Kozhakhmet (KAZ) | 9 | 3
Dave Cea (PHI) | 12 | 12 | 18
Ilia Ruderman (ISR) | 13 | 12 | 4
Dmitri Șuleac (MDA) | 0 | 2
Jasurbek Jaysunov (UZB) | 8 | 9

Round of 32
Daniel Quesada (ESP) | 6 | 2
Yiğithan Kılıç (TUR) | 2 | 1
Omid Sahak (AFG) | 7 | 3
Leon Sejranovic (AUS) | 11 | 6
Vinícius Matos (BRA) | 9 | 0 | 1
Kang Jae-gwon (KOR) | 8 | 13 | 13
Dave Cea (PHI) | 5 | 0
Jasurbek Jaysunov (UZB) | 9 | 12

Round of 16
Daniel Quesada (ESP) | 6 | 7 | 9
Leon Sejranovic (AUS) | 7 | 0 | 11
Kang Jae-gwon (KOR) | 18 | 6 | 9
Jasurbek Jaysunov (UZB) | 16 | 7 | 14

Quarterfinals
Leon Sejranovic (AUS) | 11 | 11
Jasurbek Jaysunov (UZB) | 7 | 10

==== Section 2 ====
Round of 64
Rubén Nava (MEX) | 5 | 6
Federico González (URU) | 2 | 1
Brandon Sealy (JAM) | 3 | 11
Tomáš Sittek (CZE) | 5 | 14
Diogo Costa (POR) | 4 | 0
Leroy Nsilu Dilandu (IRL) | 16 | 12
Sebastian Thune (NOR) | 6 | 9
Yazan Bassam Yousif (JOR) | 1 | 5
Shivam Tyagi (IND) | 6 | 3
Mohamad Chehade (SWE) | 9 | 4
Vasilije Peruničić (MNE) | 10 | 12 | 12
Charlélie Mercier (CAN) | 2 | 13 | 8

Round of 32
Marko Golubić (CRO) | 9 | 16
Rubén Nava (MEX) | 6 | 3
Tomáš Sittek (CZE) | 9 | 16 | 10
Leroy Nsilu Dilandu (IRL) | 12 | 3 | 7
Sebastian Thune (NOR) | 6 | 2
Mohamad Chehade (SWE) | 5 | 1
Vasilije Peruničić (MNE) | 0 | 1
Eltaj Gafarov (AZE) | 9 | 13

Round of 16
Marko Golubić (CRO) | 14 | 17
Tomáš Sittek (CZE) | 1 | 5
Sebastian Thune (NOR) | 1 | 2
Eltaj Gafarov (AZE) | 7 | 3

Quarterfinals
Marko Golubić (CRO) | 5 | 10 | 17
Eltaj Gafarov (AZE) | 7 | 0 | 5

=== Bottom half ===
==== Section 3 ====
Round of 64
Rahiti Iorss (FPO) | 4 | 6 | 3
Cameron Booth (GBR) | 6 | 2 | 9
Kaloyan Binev (BUL) | 6 | 10 | 6
Sean Laloan (HAI) | 7 | 6 | 6
Ruslan Makarov (KGZ) | 2 | 0
Mirhashem Hosseini (IRI) | 15 | 12
Rami Eissa (EGY) | 2 | 10 | 13
Stefano Maggiore (ITA) | 4 | 3 | 10
Boubacar Mangue (NIG) | 12 | 15
Arbnor Bajra (KOS) | 0 | 3
Kiel Buenaventura (USA) | 14 | 14
Stefano Crescentini (SMR) | 2 | 1

Round of 32
Stefan Takov (SRB) | 11 | 16
Cameron Booth (GBR) | 2 | 4
Sean Laloan (HAI) | 3 | 2
Mirhashem Hosseini (IRI) | 13 | 12^{P}
Rami Eissa (EGY) | 4 | 3
Boubacar Mangue (NIG) | 10 | 15
Kiel Buenaventura (USA) | 13 | 3
Nedžad Husić (BIH) | 15 | 12

Round of 16
Stefan Takov (SRB) | 8 | 10 | 11
Mirhashem Hosseini (IRI) | 3 | 12 | 10
Boubacar Mangue (NIG) | 9 | 4
Nedžad Husić (BIH) | 9 | 6

Quarterfinals
Stefan Takov (SRB) | 7 | 11
Nedžad Husić (BIH) | 1 | 2

==== Section 4 ====
Round of 64
Badr Achab (BEL) | 13 | 11
Mihai Bura (ROU) | 5 | 2
Juan Carlos Sastre (PUR) | 2 | 1
Lyve-Stone Célin (FRA) | 6 | 11
Cui Yang (CHN) | 11 | 10
Evangelos Charalambous (CYP) | 4 | 5
Gantulgyn Enkhbayar (MGL) | 1 | 1
Zurab Kintsurashvili (GEO) | 9 | 13
Ahmad Bahlool (PLE) | 11 | 10 | 13
Pan Kuei-en (TPE) | 7 | 20 | 15
Grigoris Kasidiaris (GRE) | 4 | 4
Lin Kovačič (SLO) | 8 | 8^{P}
Kadyrbech Daurov (AIN) | 10 | 14
Yasuhiro Hamada (JPN) | 2 | 1

Round of 32
Badr Achab (BEL) | 3 | 11
Lyve-Stone Célin (FRA) | 11 | 11
Cui Yang (CHN) | 3 | 3 | 8
Zurab Kintsurashvili (GEO) | 2 | 7 | 8
Pan Kuei-en (TPE) | 10 | 0
Lin Kovačič (SLO) | 12 | 9
Kadyrbech Daurov (AIN) | 8 | 4
Firas Katoussi (TUN) | 3 | 3

Round of 16
Lyve-Stone Célin (FRA) | 11 | 4
Cui Yang (CHN) | 10 | 2
Lin Kovačič (SLO) | 0 | 8
Kadyrbech Daurov (AIN) | 12 | 12

Quarterfinals
Lyve-Stone Célin (FRA) | 2 | 2
Kadyrbech Daurov (AIN) | 9 | 6
