= 2025 World Taekwondo Championships – Men's welterweight =

Taekwondo competitions

Men's welterweight at the 2025 World Championships
- Venue: Taihu International Expo Center
- Dates: 27 October 2025
- Competitors: 56 from 54 nations

Medalists
| gold medal | Henrique Marques | Brazil |
| silver medal | Xiang Qizhang | China |
| bronze medal | Artem Mytarev | Individual Neutral Athletes |
| bronze medal | Seo Geon-woo | South Korea |

The men's welterweight competition at the 2025 World Taekwondo Championships was held on 27 October 2025 in Wuxi, China. Welterweights were limited to a maximum of 80 kilograms in body mass.

== Results ==
Legend

- P — Won by punitive declaration
- R — Won by referee stop contest
- W — Won by withdrawal

=== Finals ===
| Semifinals | | | | Final |
| Seo Geon-woo (KOR) | 1 | 4 | 4 |
| Xiang Qizhang (CHN) | 4 | 3 | 4 | Xiang Qizhang (CHN) | 1 | 0 |
| Artem Mytarev (AIN) | 1 | 10 | 2 | Henrique Marques (BRA) | 2 | 0 |
| Henrique Marques (BRA) | 3 | 9 | 4 |

=== Top half ===
==== Section 1 ====
Round of 64
Brandon Sealy (JAM) | 0 | 0
Liam Sweeney (AUS) | 4 | 12
Haitam Zarhouti (MAR) | 12 | 14
Kuao Tangaere (NZL) | 0 | 0
Abdoul Bakhy Thiam (SEN) | 7 | 2
Alejandro González (PUR) | 7 | 2
Batyrkhan Toleugali (KAZ) | 11 | 5
Ahmad Rawy (EGY) | 0 | 4
Ibrahim Hidri (ALB) | 3 | 1
Guðmundur Sigurjónsson (ISL) | 9 | 10
Mitko Dzhordzhev (BUL) | 2 | 1
Mohammad Al-Adarbi (JOR) | 10 | 10

Round of 32
Firas Katoussi (TUN) | 4 | 7
Liam Sweeney (AUS) | 0 | 0
Haitam Zarhouti (MAR) | 2 | 16
Alejandro González (PUR) | 1 | 2
Batyrkhan Toleugali (KAZ) | 10 | 3
Guðmundur Sigurjónsson (ISL) | 7 | 1
Mohammad Al-Adarbi (JOR) | 10 | 2 | 10
Seo Geon-woo (KOR) | 8 | 7 | 13

Round of 16
Firas Katoussi (TUN) | 4 | 6
Haitam Zarhouti (MAR) | 2 | 3
Batyrkhan Toleugali (KAZ) | 3 | 3
Seo Geon-woo (KOR) | 4 | 12

Quarterfinals
Firas Katoussi (TUN) | 5 | 2
Seo Geon-woo (KOR) | 10 | 3

==== Section 2 ====
Round of 64
Omid Sahak (AFG) | 4 | 0
Sebastian Thune (NOR) | 4 | 1
Miguel Trejos (COL) | 7 | 7^{P} | 3
Manuel Martinho (POR) | 9 | 9 | 6
Baboo Sohun (MRI) | 0 | 0
Mehran Barkhordari (IRI) | 14 | 12
Ioannis Papadopoulos (GRE) | 11 | 4 | 14
Pedro Martínez (DOM) | 6 | 4 | 9
Jon Gashi (KOS) | 4 | 5
Shivansh Tyagi (IND) | 4 | 4
Taleh Suleymanov (AZE) | 5 | 3
Omer Dawoud (DEN) | 0 | 1^{R}

Round of 32
Jasurbek Jaysunov (UZB) | 12 | 9
Sebastian Thune (NOR) | 0 | 3
Manuel Martinho (POR) | 0 | 0
Mehran Barkhordari (IRI) | 5 | 8
Ioannis Papadopoulos (GRE) | 13 | 4 | 17
Jon Gashi (KOS) | 14 | 3 | 4
Omer Dawoud (DEN)
Xiang Qizhang (CHN) | W

Round of 16
Jasurbek Jaysunov (UZB) | 4 | 5 | 1
Mehran Barkhordari (IRI) | 6 | 3 | 4
Ioannis Papadopoulos (GRE) | 0 | 2
Xiang Qizhang (CHN) | 10 | 12

Quarterfinals
Mehran Barkhordari (IRI) | 2 | 7
Xiang Qizhang (CHN) | 2 | 8

=== Bottom half ===
==== Section 3 ====
Round of 64
Nedžad Husić (BIH) | 15 | 13
Abhishek Baral (NEP) | 0 | 0
Rustam Odinaev (SRB) | 7 | 13
Michael Davidson (GHA) | 0 | 1
Yusuf Faraj (LBN) | 1 | 2
Mikel Fernández (ESP) | 14 | 14
Kyrylo Hurnov (UKR) | 6 | 11
Idrissa Oumarou (NIG) | 1 | 6
Adam Jochman (CZE) | 2 | 0
Artem Mytarev (AIN) | 2 | 0^{R}
Raihan Fadhila (INA) | 4 | 11
Rainui Mairau (FPO) | 3 | 0

Round of 32
Joaquín Churchill (CHI) | 5 | 0
Nedžad Husić (BIH) | 0 | 0
Rustam Odinaev (SRB) | 9 | 3
Mikel Fernández (ESP) | 6 | 2
Kyrylo Hurnov (UKR) | 1 | 4 | 2
Artem Mytarev (AIN) | 3 | 3 | 6
Raihan Fadhila (INA) | 0 | 5
Oscar Kovačić (CRO) | 12 | 9

Round of 16
Joaquín Churchill (CHI) | 4 | 5 | 9^{P}
Rustam Odinaev (SRB) | 5 | 4 | 0
Artem Mytarev (AIN) | 3 | 6
Oscar Kovačić (CRO) | 0 | 4

Quarterfinals
Joaquín Churchill (CHI) | 2 | 4 | 2
Artem Mytarev (AIN) | 2 | 2 | 4

==== Section 4 ====
Round of 64
Kelvin Calderón (CUB) | 5 | 1
Troy Cammaerts (BEL) | 2 | 0
Yiğithan Kılıç (TUR) | 18 | 13
Bader Al-Herais (KUW) | 5 | 0
Nipesh Prakash (FIJ) | 1 | 1
Faysal Sawadogo (BUR) | 7^{P} | 5
Raman Turavinau (AIN) | 3 | 13
Maxime Potvin (CAN) | 0 | 1
Michele Ceccaroni (SMR) | 0 | 1
Evangelos Charalambous (CYP) | 12 | 8
Iker Casas (MEX) | 2 | 8
Hassani Andrade (PER) | 0 | 3

Round of 32
Henrique Marques (BRA) | 9 | 7
Kelvin Calderón (CUB) | 0 | 0
Yiğithan Kılıç (TUR) | 5 | 6 | 6
Faysal Sawadogo (BUR) | 9 | 5 | 12
Raman Turavinau (AIN) | 4 | 8
Evangelos Charalambous (CYP) | 1 | 2
Iker Casas (MEX) | 0 | 1
CJ Nickolas (USA) | 6 | 8

Round of 16
Henrique Marques (BRA) | 5 | 7
Faysal Sawadogo (BUR) | 0 | 1
Raman Turavinau (AIN) | 0 | 1
CJ Nickolas (USA) | 3 | 5

Quarterfinals
Henrique Marques (BRA) | 3 | 7
CJ Nickolas (USA) | 2 | 4
