= Pontes =

Pontes (Portuguese for "bridges") may refer to:

- Pontes fort, the Roman fort beside Trajan's Bridge over the Danube
- Pontes, the Roman name for Staines in Britain, where major bridges crossed the Thames as part of the Devil's Highway

== Surname ==
- Crimilda Pontes (1926–2000), American graphic designer and calligrapher
- Dulce Pontes (born 1969), Portuguese singer and songwriter
- Edival Pontes (born 1997), Brazilian taekwondo athlete
- Francisco Pontes (1905–?), Brazilian equestrian
- Francisco Pontes de Miranda (1892–1979), Brazilian jurist and diplomat
- Leonel Pontes (born 1972), Portuguese football manager
- Marcos Pontes (born 1963), Brazilian Air Force pilot, engineer, AEB astronaut, politician and author
- Norma Bahia Pontes (1941–2010), Brazilian filmmaker
- Vítor Pontes (born 1958), Portuguese retired footballer
