= 2023 World Cup Taekwondo Team Championships =

Taekwondo competition

2023 Taekwondo World Cup
- Venue: Korea International Exhibition Center; Taihu International Expo Centre
- Location: Goyang, South Korea; Wuxi, China
- Dates: 14–16 November 2023; 19 December 2023

Champions
- Men: Iran
- Women: South Korea

The 2023 World Cup Taekwondo Team Championship was held in two rounds, first in Ilsanseo-gu, Goyang, South Korea (known as Seoul World Cup) in November and second in Wuxi, China on 19 December.

== Medalists ==
| Event | Gold | Silver | Bronze |
|---|---|---|---|
| Men | Iran; Abolfazl Abbasi; Amir Mohammad Bakhshi; Mirhashem Hosseini | Australia; Tom Afonczenko; Jamie Cefai; Xavier Nikolovski; Leon Sejranovic | Brazil; Pedro Alves; Vinícius Matos; Gabriel Santos |
| Women | South Korea; Hong Hyo-rim; Jang Eun-ji; Myeong Mi-na; Suh Tan-ya | Morocco; Fatima-Ezzahra Aboufaras; Omaima Boumah; Merieme Khoulal; Safia Salih | China; Chen Lin; Shen Zinuo; Wu Qiaozhen; Zhou Lijun |
| Mixed | Brazil; Pedro Alves; Vinícius Matos; Gabriel Santos; Sandy Macedo; Maria Clara Pacheco | Morocco; Khalid Daoudi; Soufiane El-Asbi; Ayoub El-Yaqini; Omaima Boumah; Merieme Khoulal; Safia Salih | Iran; Abolfazl Abbasi; Amir Mohammad Bakhshi; Mirhashem Hosseini; Melika Mirhosseini; Tina Mondaloo; Yalda Valinejad |
| Mixed | China; Cui Yang; Meng Mingkuan; Xiang Qizhang; Song Jie; Xing Jiani; Zhou Zeqi | Uzbekistan; Jasurbek Jaysunov; Najmiddin Kosimkhojiev; Shukhrat Salaev; Feruza Sadikova; Ozoda Sobirjonova | South Korea; Kim Ji-hun; Lee Seung-gu; Myeong Mi-na; Suh Tan-ya |
| Mixed | China; Cui Yang; Meng Mingkuan; Xiang Qizhang; Song Jie; Xing Jiani; Zhou Zeqi | Uzbekistan; Jasurbek Jaysunov; Najmiddin Kosimkhojiev; Shukhrat Salaev; Feruza Sadikova; Ozoda Sobirjonova | Brazil; Pedro Alves; Vinícius Matos; Gabriel Santos; Sandy Macedo; Milena Titoneli |

== Seoul ==
=== Men ===
Quarterfinals
Mexico | 0
Australia | 2
Ivory Coast | 1
China | 2
South Korea | 1
Iran | 2
Morocco | 0
Brazil | 2

Semifinals
Australia | 2
China | 1
Iran | 2
Brazil | 0

Final
Australia | 0
Iran | 2
Bronze medal contest
China | 1
Brazil | 2

=== Women ===
Quarterfinals
Iran | 0
China | 2
Morocco | 2
Ivory Coast | 0
Brazil | 1
Mexico | 2

Semifinals
South Korea | 2
China | 1
Morocco | 2
Mexico | 1

Final
South Korea | 2
Morocco | 0
Bronze medal contest
China | 2
Mexico | 1

=== Mixed ===
Quarterfinals
Morocco | 2
Mexico | 0
South Korea | 1
Brazil | 2
Iran | 2
China | 0

Semifinals
Ivory Coast | 0
Morocco | 2
Brazil | 2
Iran | 1

Final
Morocco | 0
Brazil | 2
Bronze medal contest
Ivory Coast | 0
Iran | 2

== Wuxi ==
=== Mixed ===
Round of 16
Brazil | 64
Kazakhstan | 43

Quarterfinals
Rwanda | 29
Brazil | 153
India | 21
China | 86
South Korea 1 | 39
South Korea 2 | 53
Morocco | 58
Uzbekistan | 78

Semifinals
Brazil | 43
China | 88
South Korea 2 | 32
Uzbekistan | 48

Final
China | 36
Uzbekistan | 30

Repechage 1
Rwanda | 32
Kazakhstan | 114

Repechage 2
India | 7
Kazakhstan | 37
South Korea 1 | 49
Morocco | 47

Bronze medal contests
South Korea 2 | 21
Kazakhstan | 20
South Korea 1 | 32
Brazil | 47
