= Brukkaros Solar Observatory =

Solar observatory in Namibia

The Brukkaros Solar Observatory was a solar observatory installed on Brukkaros Mountain in the ǁKaras Region of Namibia. It was financed and operated by a cooperation of the American National Geographic Society and the Smithsonian Institution, and it was operational between 1926 and 1931.

== Installation ==
In 1926 the National Geographic Society, in cooperation with the Smithsonian Institution, financed an expedition to South-West Africa (now Namibia) to measure the intensity of solar radiation. The project was managed by the Smithsonian Astrophysical Observatory, which from 1906 to 1944 was directed by Dr Charles Greeley Abbot. During these years the observatory was dedicated mainly to the study of possible variations in the solar constant and the effects of such variations on the weather. For this purpose solar observatories had been established in Chile and Arizona. To check and confirm the small variations in the solar constant found at these two sites, Abbot received a grant from the National Geographic Society in March 1925 to select a site for a third solar observatory, equip it, and carry out observations for a few years. After preliminary investigations a decision was reached to site the observatory somewhere in present Namibia.

== Location of the observatory ==
Abbot arrived in South Africa (which administered South West Africa under a League of Nations mandate at that time) in March 1926. After consulting several local experts and considering sites near the town of Aus and at the Spitzkoppe he decided that the best site would be on Brukkaros Mountain, about 100 km north of Keetmanshoop. He visited the mountain in the company of Mr A. Dryden, inspector of works at Keetmanshoop, who played a major role in the planning and building of the observatory. They provisionally selected a site inside the ring mountain on the south-western side, just below the rim.

The Brukkaros Solar Observatory was built at 25°52.8′S 17°46.7′E, at an elevation of about 1510 meters. Its design was based on that of the observatories already operating in Chile and Arizona. A shallow tunnel, 3 m wide and 2.2 m high, was excavated by blasting and extended outwards by cemented stone walls and a concrete roof to a total length of 10.5 m. This space was divided into three small rooms by wooden partitions and a stone instrument platform built in front of it.

== Instruments ==
An Abbot silver-disk pyrheliometer was placed on the platform outside the observatory tunnel to measure the solar irradiance. The instrument was on an equatorial mount, so that the sun could be followed by adjusting a single screw. Exposures needed to be accurately timed, for which purpose a pendulum beating half seconds was used. The altitude of the sun at the time of each observation was measured with a theodolite, so that the amount of air through which the radiation had passed could be calculated. A pyranometer was used to measure irradiance from a circular region of sky around the sun, excluding the sun itself. It was on the same mount as the pyrheliometer, so that it would automatically point in the same direction. The stone platform also contained a coelostat, consisting of two flat mirrors, one of which was driven by clockwork and mounted so as to keep the sun's rays reflected continuously through an opening in the northern wall of the tunnel. The mirrors were made of stellite, a hard cobalt alloy that does not form tarnish easily. Inside the tunnel a well dispersed spectrum of the sun was slowly passed over the sensitive strip of a bolometer. The resulting bolograph displayed the relative amounts of energy at each wavelength in the visible and infrared region of the spectrum, which could be used to determine atmospheric absorption at various wavelengths. After various corrections, the value of the solar constant could be calculated.

Regular weather observations were also made at the site from 11 August 1927 and the results reported to the Weather Bureau in Windhoek.

== Staff ==
The team manning the solar observatory consisted of two persons, a field director and an assistant. The director of the Brukkaros team was William H. Hoover, who was soon joined by his wife and infant daughter. His assistant was Frederick Atwood Greeley. They reached Cape Town on 13 September 1926 and after travelling to Keetmanshoop by train moved their instruments and household goods to the observatory by ox-waggon. It was understood that they would remain there for three years.

In September 1929, the team was replaced by Louis O. Sordahl, assisted by A.G. Froiland. Sordahl was accompanied by his wife Margaret, who was a naturalist. She collected various mammal, bird, reptile, insect and plant specimens, which she donated to the National Museum of Natural History. Froiland was recalled in March 1931. He was replaced by a South African, Arthur Bleksley, who stayed for some six months before accepting a more permanent post in Johannesburg. A subsequent assistant, D.J. Hatting, remained for only four weeks. Thereafter Mrs. Sordahl took over some of the work.

== Evaluation of the observatory's work ==
The daily values of the solar constant obtained at the Brukkaros Solar Observatory from December 1926 to December 1930 were published in Volume 5 of the "Annals of the Astrophysical Observatory". These values turned out to be somewhat unstable. It appears that meteorological conditions at Brukkaros Mountain made the compensation for atmospheric absorption inaccurate. First, the Brukkaros observatory was at a relatively low elevation, with the result that atmospheric absorption was both substantial and variable. Second, the site proved to be more windy than anticipated. The strong winds often carried dust over the mountain and also affected the stability of the instruments.

The observatory was closed in December 1931. Its work was considered important enough locally to deserve a mention in the "Official Year Book of the Union of South Africa", which also reported its closure. The instruments were returned to Washington and donated to the Smithsonian Institution by the National Geographic Society. They were later used at observatories in Egypt and Chile.

Several years later, when reporting recomputed daily solar constant values for the period 1923 to 1939, Abbot had distanced himself from the Brukkaros Observatory, describing it as 'so far inferior that its results have not been reduced' and 'subject to sources of error which we have now eliminated'. However, the variations in the solar constant that Abbot derived from the results of his other solar observatories never convinced most meteorologists either, and were ascribed to uncorrected variations in atmospheric absorption.

The 3000 pyrheliometer measurements of solar irradiance made at Brukkaros nonetheless proved useful. These measurements were made available to the South African Weather Bureau when it started its country-wide radiation survey in 1952. At that time they represented the longest series of measurements of the solar radiation incident on the central plateau of southern Africa. The measurements were used for two purposes. First, to calculate the solar irradiance available at various times during the day and year, for possible industrial applications. Second, to estimate the amount of total (sun plus sky) radiation for climatological purposes.
