= Seo Geon-woo =

South Korean taekwondo practitioner (born 2003)

Seo Goon-woo
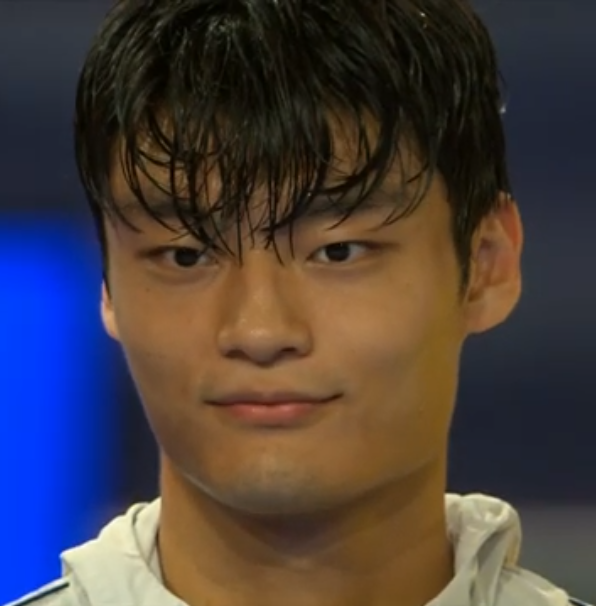
- At the 2025 Summer World University Games

Personal information
- Born: 20 December 2003 (age 22) Seoul, South Korea
- Height: 184 cm (6 ft 0 in)

Sport
- Sport: Taekwondo
Medal record
Men's taekwondo
Representing South Korea
World Championships
Bronze medal – third place	2025 Wuxi	80 kg
Asian Games
Silver medal – second place	2022 Hangzhou	Mixed team
Asian Championships
Gold medal – first place	2026 Ulaanbaatar	80 kg
Bronze medal – third place	2024 Da Nang	80 kg
Bronze medal – third place	2022 Chuncheon	80 kg
World University Games
Gold medal – first place	2025 Rhine-Ruhr	80 kg
Gold medal – first place	2025 Rhine-Ruhr	Team Kyorugi
Bronze medal – third place	2021 Chengdu	80 kg

Seo Geon-woo (Korean: 서건우; born 20 December 2003) is a South Korean taekwondo practitioner.

== Career ==
At the 2022 Asian Taekwondo Championships he won bronze in the 80 kg category in Chuncheon, South Korea. That year, he won bronze at the delayed 2021 Summer World University Games in Chengdu.

He was a silver medalist at the 2022 Asian Games in the mixed team event. During the 2022 World Taekwondo Grand Prix series he won the event in Manchester, England. He won in Manchester again during the 2023 World Taekwondo Grand Prix series in the 80 kg event.

He was a bronze medalist in the -80 kg category at the 2024 Asian Taekwondo Championships in Vietnam. He was selected for the 2024 Summer Olympics in Paris for his Olympic debut. He lost to Edi Hrnic of Denmark in the bronze medal match.

He won the gold medal in the -80kg category at the 2025 World University Games in Germany, Jiunyi Hung of Chinese Taipei 2-1 in the final. He also won the gold medal in the team kyorugi event, as the discipline made its debut as a medal event.

In October 2025, he won the bronze medal at the 2025 World Taekwondo Championships in the men's welterweight division, after he defeated the Olympic champion Firas Katousi of Tunisia in the quarter-final.
