= Taekwondo at the 2023 European Games – Men's 74 kg =

Taekwondo competition

Men's 74 kg at the 2023 European Games
- Venue: Krynica-Zdrój Arena
- Date: 25 June
- Competitors: 16 from 16 nations

Medalists
| gold medal | Zurab Kintsurashvili | Georgia |
| silver medal | Nedžad Husić | Bosnia and Herzegovina |
| bronze medal | Daniel Quesada | Spain |
| bronze medal | Stefan Takov | Serbia |

The men's 74kg competition in taekwondo at the 2023 European Games took place on 25 June at the Krynica-Zdrój Arena.

== Schedule ==
All times are Central European Summer Time (UTC+2).

| Date | Time | Event |
|---|---|---|
| Sunday, 25 June 2023 | 09:24 | Round of 16 |
| Sunday, 25 June 2023 | 14:12 | Quarterfinals |
| Sunday, 25 June 2023 | 15:48 | Semifinals |
| Sunday, 25 June 2023 | 16:36 | Repechage |
| Sunday, 25 June 2023 | 19:12 | Bronze medal bouts |
| Sunday, 25 June 2023 | 20:12 | Final |

== Results ==
Round of 16
Daniel Quesada (ESP) | 1 | 11
Sargis Sargsyan (ARM) | 6 | 0 | WD
Leroy Nsilu Dilandu (IRL) | 9 | 3
Zurab Kintsurashvili (GEO) | 13 | 12
Stefan Takov (SRB) | 14 | 13
Athman Bouthouyak (FRA) | 2 | 1
Eltaj Gafarov (AZE)
Łukasz Cudnoch (POL) | WD
Nedžad Husić (BIH) | 12 | 13
Kaloyan Binev (BUL) | 7 | 3
Lin Kovačič (SLO) | 2 | 3 | 12
Badr Achab (BEL) | 5 | 3 | 16
Muhammed Emin Yıldız (TUR) | 2 | 5
Sebastian Thune (NOR) | 1 | 4
Mohammed Ali Chehade (SWE) | 2 | 2
Marko Golubić (CRO) | 9 | 9

Quarterfinals
Daniel Quesada (ESP) | 4 | 4
Zurab Kintsurashvili (GEO) | 5 | 4
Stefan Takov (SRB) | 8 | 15
Eltaj Gafarov (AZE) | 2 | 2
Nedžad Husić (BIH) | 8 | 16
Badr Achab (BEL) | 5 | 4
Muhammed Emin Yıldız (TUR) | 8 | 5 | 4
Marko Golubić (CRO) | 7 | 9 | 12

Semifinals
Zurab Kintsurashvili (GEO) | 2 | 11
Stefan Takov (SRB) | 2 | 10
Nedžad Husić (BIH) | 13 | 10
Marko Golubić (CRO) | 1 | 4

Final
Zurab Kintsurashvili (GEO) | 10 | 6
Nedžad Husić (BIH) | 7 | 4

=== Repechage ===
Repechage
Daniel Quesada (ESP) | 13 | 13
Leroy Nsilu Dilandu (IRL) | 1 | 1
Kaloyan Binev (BUL) | 7^{P} | 7
Badr Achab (BEL) | 6 | 3

Bronze medal bout
Marko Golubić (CRO) | 0 | 1
Daniel Quesada (ESP) | 4 | 4
Kaloyan Binev (BUL) | 3 | 2 | 2
Stefan Takov (SRB) | 7 | 2 | 7
