= Taekwondo at the 2022 Mediterranean Games – Men's 80 kg =

Taekwondo – Men's 80 kg at the 2022 Mediterranean Games
- Venue: Mohammed Ben Ahmed Convention Centre
- Date: 4 July
- Competitors: 13 from 13 nations

Medalists
gold medal	Seif Eissa	Egypt
silver medal	Daniel Quesada	Spain
bronze medal	Firas Katoussi	Tunisia
bronze medal	Apostolos Telikostoglou	Greece

The men's 80 kg competition in taekwondo at the 2022 Mediterranean Games was held on 4 July at the Mohammed Ben Ahmed Convention Centre in Oran.

== Results ==
Legend

- PTG — Won by Points Gap
- SUP — Won by superiority
- OT — Won on over time (Golden Point)
- DQ — Won by disqualification
- PUN — Won by punitive declaration
- WD — Won by withdrawal

Round of 16
Youssef Boatris (MAR)	33
Ismaël Bouzid Souhli (FRA)	31
Nedžad Husić (BIH)	28^{PTG}
Arber Bajra (KOS)	3
Islam Guetfaya (ALG)	5
Firas Katoussi (TUN)	26^{PTG}
Samuele Baliva (ITA)	4
Stefan Takov (SRB)	20
Hüseyin Kartal (TUR)	24
Filip Dodevski (MKD)	13

Quarterfinals
Seif Eissa (EGY)	13
Youssef Boatris (MAR)	9
Nedžad Husić (BIH)	4
Firas Katoussi (TUN)	22
Apostolos Telikostoglou (GRE)	5
Stefan Takov (SRB)	1
Hüseyin Kartal (TUR)	21
Daniel Quesada (ESP)	32

Semifinals
Seif Eissa (EGY)	7
Firas Katoussi (TUN)	5
Apostolos Telikostoglou (GRE)	1
Daniel Quesada (ESP)	13

Final
Seif Eissa (EGY)	7
Daniel Quesada (ESP)	5
