= Lynne Karen Deutsch =

American astrophysicist

- Born: November 26, 1956; Chicago
- Died: April 2, 2004 (aged 47)
- Occupation: Astrophysicist
- Known for: Infrared Array Technology

Lynne Karen Deutsch (November 26, 1956 – April 2, 2004) was an American astrophysicist who helped develop the Smithsonian Astrophysical Observatory/University of Arizona Mid-Infrared Array Camera (MIRAC). Deutsch was born in Chicago and earned her MS from MIT in 1983 and Ph.D. from Harvard in 1990. Her dissertation was on grain processing and the evolution of planetary nebulae with a mid-infrared array camera. Between 1990 and 1992 Deutsch served as a Post-doctoral Fellow at the NASA Ames Research Center where she worked on MIRAC.

After her fellowship she taught at Smith College between 1993 and 1996 subsequently joining the Astronomy Department faculty of Boston University in 1996. At Boston University Deutsch taught star formation, interstellar medium, infrared astronomy and instrumentation. Deutsch's work with NASA led to the Spitzer Space Telescope's capture of gas and dust in space where stars are born on the eastern edge of as W5 in the constellation Cassiopeia.
