= Arthur Bleksley =

South African professor of applied mathematics and an astronomer

Arthur Edward Herbert Bleksley
- Born: 1908; Matatiele
- Died: 1984 (aged 75–76)
- Education: Stellenbosch University; University of Witwatersrand
- Scientific career
- Fields: Applied mathematics Astronomy
- Workplaces: Solar Research Station, Brukkaros Mountain; University of Witwatersrand
- Thesis: A Statistical and Analytical Study of the Phenomenon of Long-period Stellar Variability. (1937)

Arthur Edward Herbert Bleksley (1908, Matatiele – 1984) was a South African Professor of Applied Mathematics and an astronomer. Bleksley's early research involved the astrophysics and astronomy of variable stars. He encouraged science awareness in South Africa by publishing articles about science, by being on a popular radio show, and through his presentations at the Johannesburg Planetarium.

== Education and career ==
Bleksley was born in the Eastern Cape and attended the Outeniqua High School in George. After matriculation he studied at Stellenbosch University and graduated cum laude in 1927 and went on to obtain his M.Sc. in 1929, winning the Van der Horst Prize. In 1930 he joined the Solar Research Station run by the National Geographic Society and the Smithsonian Institution at Brukkaros, the caldera of an extinct volcano in South West Africa (Namibia). American researcher William H. Hoover and his colleague Frederick Atwood Greeley, ran an observatory on the mountain from 1926 to December 1931, collecting solar radiation data so as to find a correlation with the earth's weather. To this end detailed observations were made of the Solar Constant. High-altitude observatories were set up at various locations - Mount Montezuma in Chile, initially at Mount Harqua Hala in Arizona (later moved to Table Mountain in California) and lastly Mount Brukkaros, a site selected by Charles Greeley Abbot, and later moved to Mount St. Katherine on the Sinai Peninsula. The Brukkaros observatory consisted of a 10m deep tunnel in the flank of the mountain. A solar telescope or coelostat at the mouth of the tunnel passed sunlight to a spectrograph, an Ångström compensation pyrheliometer and a bolometer further in.

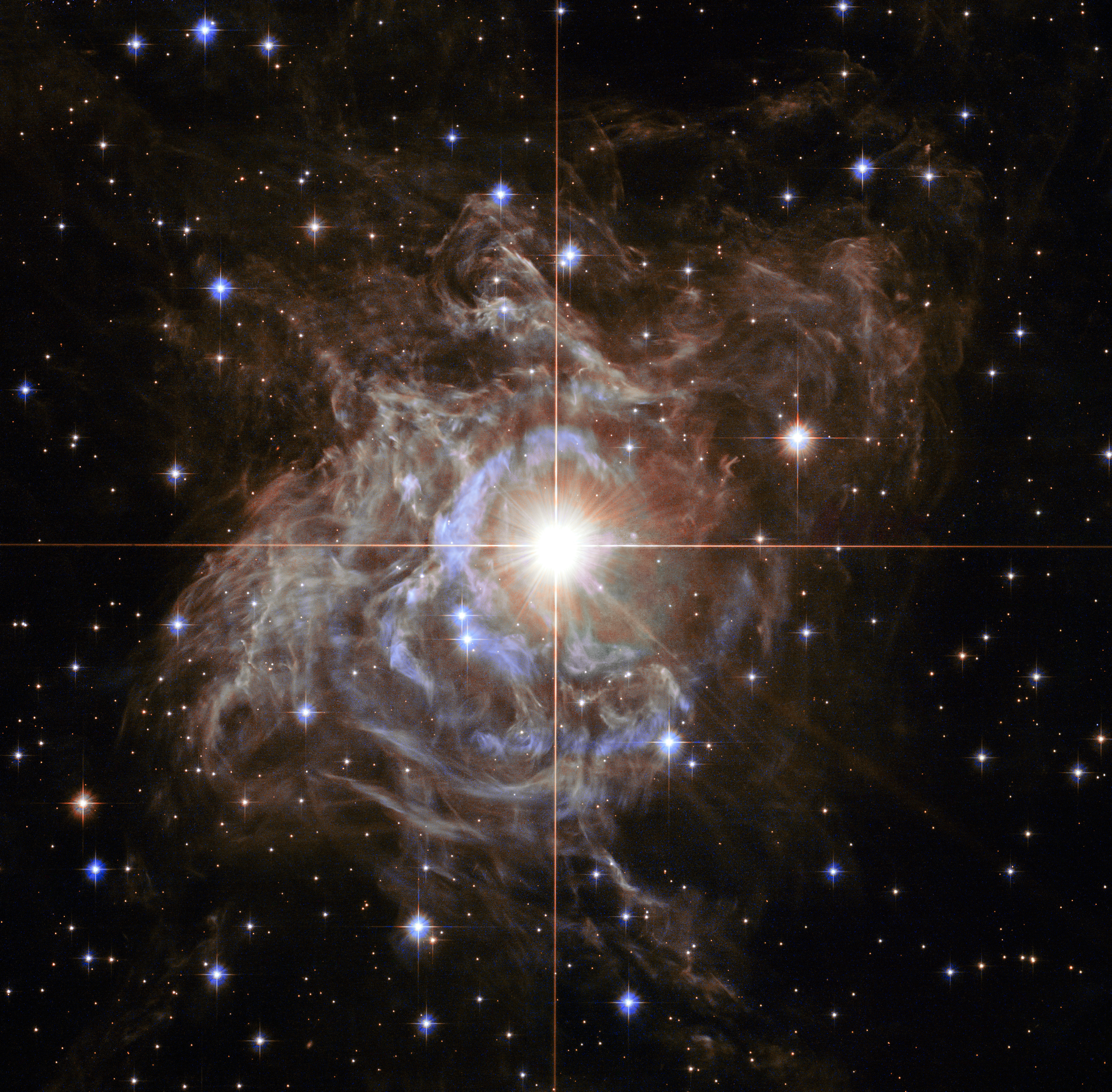
RS Puppis is one of the brightest known Cepheid variable stars in the Milky Way galaxy; image, Hubble Space Telescope

In 1932 Bleksley was appointed as Junior Lecturer in the Department of Applied Mathematics at the University of Witwatersrand, eventually becoming head of the department. Whilst there he worked on and completed his doctoral thesis A Statistical and Analytical Study of the Phenomenon of Long-period Stellar Variability. Bleksley developed a mathematical model of radially pulsating stars, and the observations for the Cepheid variable stars and long-period variable stars compared favourably with his model's predictions. During this period he took sabbatical leave and studied under Sir Arthur Eddington at Cambridge, Professor Hans Ludendorff of the Astrophysical Observatory at Potsdam and Ejnar Hertzsprung at Leiden. He was President of the Astronomical Society of Southern Africa in 1948/49 and one of about 100 people who attended the founding of the SA Institute of Physics on 7 July 1955.

== Personal life ==
Bleksley showed great interest in parapsychology and in 1969 attended a conference at Saint-Paul de Vence in France. The conference dealt with creativity and its possible links to parapsychology. Other participants included Kenneth Burke, Eugenio Gaddini, the Italian psychoanalyst, Jerre Mangione, the Italian-American author, Emilio Servadio, the Italian-Indian psychoanalyst and parapsychologist, and W. Grey Walter, the neurophysiologist and robotician.

He was talented musically and performed as a church organist while still a scholar. His ability to articulate difficult concepts in the fields of astronomy and applied mathematics made him a popular tutor, and inspired thousands of students who sat through his lectures. His sense of humour, quick mind, and broad range of interests made him a valued member of the team of "Three Wise Men" on the Springbok Radio quiz show, Test the Team, from 1957 into the 1980s, the other two being Grant Loudon and Eric Rosenthal.
