= Olive A. Greeley =

Assistant field director and bolometer assistant

- Born: June 25, 1901; Maxwell
- Died: May 21, 1982 (aged 80); Laguna Hills
- Employer: Smithsonian Astrophysical Observatory
- Spouse(s): Frederick Atwood Greeley

Olive A. Greeley (June 10, 1901 – May 21, 1982) was an assistant field director and bolometer assistant for the Smithsonian Astrophysical Observatory.

Greeley was born on June 10, 1901, as Olive Adelia Troup in Maxwell, Iowa. Her father was Martin H. Troup and her mother was Rose Adelia Randall. Olive's mother died in 1908. Her father remarried in 1947 to Inez Martin Troup, who became her stepmother.

On June 10, 1937, she married Frederick Atwood Greeley in Riverside, California after meeting at the Smithsonian Astrophysical Observatory Solar Observing Station at Table Mountain. In 1942, she traveled to Lima, Peru with her husband. From 1943 to 1946, she served as bolometer assistant to Frederick Atwood Greeley at the Smithsonian Astrophysical Observatory station at Mount Montezuma, Chile. She also served as the assistant station director for the Smithsonian Astrophysical Observatory Miami Solar Station in Miami, Florida, from May 1, 1947, to July 31, 1948. During her position at the Table Mountain Station, Mount Montezuma Station, and the Miami Solar Station, she documented the day-to-day activities of the stations.

Olive A. Greeley died on May 21,1982 in Laguna Hills, California.
