= Taekwondo at the 2026 Asian Games – Men's 80 kg =

Taekwondo competition

Men's 80 kg at the 2026 Asian Games
- Venue: Toyohashi City General Gymnasium
- Date: 2 October 2026
- Competitors: 16 from 16 nations

Medalists
gold medal	Jasurbek Jaysunov	Uzbekistan
silver medal	Hung Jiun-yi	Chinese Taipei
bronze medal	Saleh El-Sharabaty	Jordan
bronze medal	Batyrkhan Toleugali	Kazakhstan

The men's 80 kilograms event at the 2026 Asian Games took place on 2 October 2026 at Toyohashi City General Gymnasium, Toyohashi, Japan.

Each bout consisted of up to three rounds, lasting two minutes apiece. The athlete who scored more points in each round was the winner of that round; the bout finished when one athlete had won two rounds (and thus the match).

Jasurbek Jaysunov from Uzbekistan won the gold medal.

== Schedule ==
All times are Japan Standard Time (UTC+09:00)

Date	Time	Event
Friday, 2 October 2026	13:30	Round of 16
Friday, 2 October 2026	13:30	Quarterfinals
Friday, 2 October 2026	17:10	Semifinals
Friday, 2 October 2026	17:10	Gold medal contest

== Results ==
Round of 16
Va Mithona (CAM)	4	11
Takato Kato (JPN)	10	17
Saleh El-Sharabaty (JOR)	15	16
Aslanbek Fazylov (TJK)	4	0
Raihan Fadhila (INA)	8	4
Tareg Hamedi (KSA)	2	0
Jasurbek Jaysunov (UZB)	12	19
Abhishek Baral (NEP)	2	2
Krittayot Phrompatju (THA)	0	4
Batyrkhan Toleugali (KAZ)	9	8
Xiang Qizhang (CHN)	5	2
Amir Sina Bakhtiari (IRI)	4	0
Dave Cea (PHI)	2	1
Hung Jiun-yi (TPE)	17	12
Kang Jae-gwon (KOR)	18	20
Mahmoud Al-Hussein (ART)	7	5

Quarterfinals
Takato Kato (JPN)	0	4
Saleh El-Sharabaty (JOR)	12	20
Raihan Fadhila (INA)	6	2
Jasurbek Jaysunov (UZB)	11	4
Batyrkhan Toleugali (KAZ)	6	1
Xiang Qizhang (CHN)	2	0
Hung Jiun-yi (TPE)	9	6
Kang Jae-gwon (KOR)	7	3

Semifinals
Saleh El-Sharabaty (JOR)	4	4
Jasurbek Jaysunov (UZB)	5	9
Batyrkhan Toleugali (KAZ)	0	0	5
Hung Jiun-yi (TPE)	0	11	7

Gold medal contest
Jasurbek Jaysunov (UZB)	2	3	5
Hung Jiun-yi (TPE)	2	6	3
