= Henrique Marques (taekwondo) =

Brazilian taekwondo practitioner (born 2004)

Henrique Marques Rodrigues
Personal information
- Born: 11 March 2004 (age 22) Itaboraí, Rio de Janeiro

Sport
- Sport: Taekwondo
Medal record
Representing Brazil
Men's taekwondo
World Championships
Gold medal – first place	2025 Wuxi	80 kg
Grand Prix
Gold medal – first place	2025 Bangkok	80 kg
Gold medal – first place	2026 Paris	80 kg
Silver medal – second place	2026 Rome	80 kg
Bronze medal – third place	2025 Muju	80 kg
Bronze medal – third place	2026 Muju	80 kg
South American Games
Gold medal – first place	2026 Santa Fe	80 kg
Pan American Championships
Gold medal – first place	2026 Rio de Janeiro	80 kg
Bronze medal – third place	2022 Punta Cana	80 kg
World U21 Championships
Bronze medal – third place	2025 Nairobi	87 kg
Junior Pan American Games
Gold medal – first place	2025 Asunción	80 kg
Gold medal – first place	2025 Asunción	Mixed team
South American Youth Games
Gold medal – first place	2022 Rosario	+73 kg

Henrique Marques Rodrigues Fernandes (born 11 March 2004) is a Brazilian taekwondo practitioner. He represented Brazil at the 2024 Summer Olympics.

Marques won the 2025 World Taekwondo Championships in the men's welterweight division.

== Career ==
In April 2022, Marques was a flag bearer for Brazil at the Youth South American Games in Rosario, Argentina. He won the gold medal at the event in the -80kg division. Later that season, he earned a bronze medal at the Pan American Taekwondo Championships.

In April 2024, he qualified for the 2024 Olympic Games through a qualification event held in San Domingo, Dominican Republic.

At the 2024 Summer Olympics, Marques competed in the 80kg category, reaching the quarter finals.

In October 2025, Marques won a gold medal at the World Championships held in Wuxi, China. With this result, he became the first Brazilian male taekwondo world champion. In his path to the title in the men's 80 kg category, he defeated CJ Nickolas in the quarter-finals, and Artem Mytarev in the semi-finals, before beating Xiang Qizhang of China in the final.

== Awards and Honors ==
2025

- World Taekwondo Awards – Male Athlete of the Year
