= Eugenio Gaddini =

Italian physician and psychoanalyst

- Born: 18 January 1916; Cerignola (Apulia, Italy)
- Died: 27 September 1985 (aged 69); Rome
- Citizenship: Italy
- Education: Sapienza University of Rome
- Known for: Merycism
- Scientific career
- Fields: Psychoanalysis
- Workplaces: Rome

Notes
- President of the Italian Psychoanalytic Society (1978)

Eugenio Gaddini (18 January 1916 – 27 September 1985) was an Italian physician and psychoanalyst. He was one of the most important psychoanalysts in Italy and occupied a prominent place in the international psychoanalytic movement. He was interested in psyche birth and its progress beginning with lived experience. He is best known for his ideas on the rumination syndrome, or merycism. He wrote several books and papers including A psychoanalytic theory of infantile experience.

== Biography ==
Eugenio Gaddini, born in Cerignola (Apulia, Italy), received a philosophic and literary education and earned his M.D. in 1942 from the University of Rome. From 1951, he was analyzed by Emilio Servadio (it) and in 1956 he gave up his position as head physician in Roma hospital to devote himself to psychoanalysis.

Admitted in 1953 to the Italian Psychoanalytic Society, he became president in 1978 and editor of Rivista di Psicoanalisi (the Italian Review of Psychoanalysis). He held a teaching position at the Rome Psychoanalytic Center and founded the Florence Psychoanalytic Center. He was a member of the International Psychoanalytical Association.

He died in Rome in 1985.

== Ideas ==
His theoretical concepts were based on the premise that the mind is not strictly localized in the brain but extended through the body.

[Gaddini] then follows the path of differentiation of the mind from bodily functions, as well as the differentiation of physiological learning from mental learning.

— Gaddini, Gaddini, E. (1987). "Notes on the mind-body question". International Journal of Psychoanalysis. 68 (3): 315–329. PMID 3667082.

Influenced both by Freudian psychoanalysis and Donald Winnicott's techniques, he provided an innovative theory of early mental states, postulating the existence of a "fundamental mental organization" which serves as the basis for the formation of the self.

From his work on rumination syndrome, or merycism, he developed the concept of imitation, a form of mental functioning tied to the "protopsychic" perception that precedes thought and that lasts a lifetime. He saw the imitation as a permanent structure and not just a precursor of the processes of identification and projection. The contribution of Gaddini was to highlight how the imitation not only represents one moment in a process that leads to the thought formation, but also a stable relational form.

In 1969, he participated in a conference on parapsychology organized by Arthur Bleksley at Saint-Paul de Vence in France. The conference dealt with creativity and its possible links to parapsychology. Other participants included Kenneth Burke, Jerre Mangione, the Italian-American author, Emilio Servadio, the Italian-Indian psychoanalyst and parapsychologist and W. Grey Walter, the neurophysiologist and robotician.

Gaddini's writings have been translated into English in 1992.

== Bibliography ==
- Gaddini, E. (1964). "On Constitutive Phenomena of Counter-Transference". Psyche: Zeitschrift für Psychoanalyse und ihre Anwendungen. 18: 139–159. PMID 14172577.
- Gaddini, R.; Gaddini, E. (1970). "Transitional objects and the process of individuation: A study in three different social groups". Journal of the American Academy of Child Psychiatry. 9 (2): 347–365. doi:10.1016/S0002-7138(09)61842-2. PMID 5482392.
- Gaddini, E. (1972). "Aggression and the pleasure principle: Towards a psychoanalytic theory of aggression". International Journal of Psychoanalysis. 53 (2): 191–197. PMID 5057063.
- Gaddini, E. (1976). "Discussion of 'the role of family life in child development'. On 'father formation' in early child development". International Journal of Psychoanalysis. 57 (4): 397–401. PMID 1002373.
- Gaddini, E. (1982). "Early defensive fantasies and the psychoanalytical process". International Journal of Psychoanalysis. 63 (Pt 3): 379–388. PMID 7129782.
- Gaddini, E. (1982). "Acting out in the psychoanalytic session". International Journal of Psychoanalysis. 63 (1): 57–64. PMID 7076399.
