= Loyal Blaine Aldrich =

American astrophysicist and astronomer

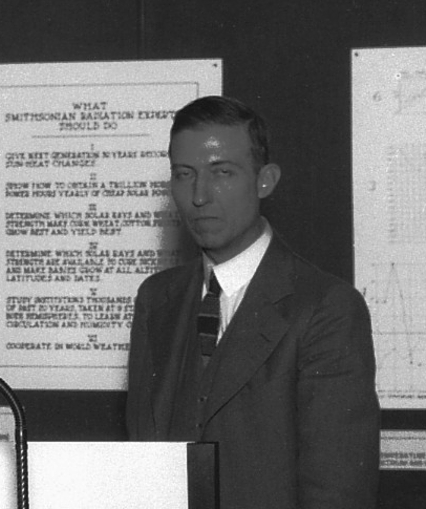
- Aldrich in 1927
- Born: November 20, 1884; Wisconsin, United States
- Died: February 11, 1965 (aged 80); Washington D.C., United States
- Education: University of Wisconsin
- Scientific career
- Fields: astrophysics

Loyal Blaine Aldrich (November 20, 1884 – February 11, 1965) was an American astrophysicist and astronomer of the Smithsonian Institution. Upon graduation from the University of Wisconsin in 1907, Aldrich became a Smithsonian Astrophysical Observatory assistant to Charles Greeley Abbot. The observatory conducted astrophysical research on solar radiation and the amount of energy from the Sun that strikes the outer edge of the Earth's atmosphere. Abbot became director of the observatory in 1907 and established solar observing stations in the United States, South America, and Africa to carry out research on solar radiation. Aldrich became director of the observatory from 1942 to 1955. Harvard University astronomy department chairman Fred Lawrence Whipple became director of the observatory when Aldrich retired.

== Family ==
Aldrich married Elizabeth Stanley (born October 9, 1896). Their son, Stanley Loyal Aldrich, assisted his father operating the observing station in the Chilean Andes until returning to the United States in 1957 so his daughters might receive education at Windham, Maine, where he taught high school mathematics.

== Studies ==
Aldrich assisted Abbott's mapping of the infrared solar spectrum and carried out systematic studies of variation in solar radiation, its relation to the sunspot cycle, and its effect on weather variation. He also studied the nature of atmospheric transmission and absorption and assisted Abbot perfecting various standardised instruments now widely used for measuring the Sun's heat.

== Publications ==
- A study of the lead voltameter (1907)
- Smithsonian pyrheliometry revised (1913 with Charles Greeley Abbot)
- New evidence on the intensity of solar radiation outside the atmosphere (1915 with Abbot & Frederick E. Fowle)
- The pyranometer : an instrument for measuring sky radiation (1916 with Abbot)
- On the use of the pyranometer (1916 with Abbot)
- On the distribution of radiation over the sun's disk and new evidences of the solar variability (1916 with Abbot & Fowle)
- The Smithsonian eclipse expedition of June 8, 1918 (1919)
- The reflecting power of clouds (1919)
- The melikeron - an approximately black-body pyranometer (1922)
- The distribution of energy in the spectra of the sun and stars (1923 with Abbot & Fowle)
- A study of body radiation (1928)
- An improved water-flow pyrheliometer and the standard scale of solar radiation (1932 with Abbot)
- Supplementary notes on body radiation (1932)
- The standard scale of solar radiation (1934 with Abbot)
- Smithsonian pyrheliometry and the Andean volcanic eruptions of April 1932 (1944)
- The solar constant and sunspot numbers (1945)
- Smithsonian pyrheliometry and the standard scale of solar radiation (1948 with Abbot)
- Energy spectra of some of the brighter stars (1948 with Abbot)
- The Abbot silver-disk pyrheliometer (1949)
- Note on Fowle's spectroscopic method for the determination of aqueous vapor in the atmosphere (1949)
