= Taekwondo at the 2021 Islamic Solidarity Games – Men's 74 kg =

Taekwondo – Men's 74 kg at the 2021 Islamic Solidarity Games
- Venue: Selcuk University 19 Mayis Sport Hall
- Date: 12 August
- Competitors: 18 from 18 nations

Medalists
gold medal	Amir Mohammad Bakhshi	Iran
silver medal	Ahmad Bahlool	Palestine
bronze medal	Muhammed Emin Yıldız	Turkey
bronze medal	Jasurbek Jaysunov	Uzbekistan

The men's 74 kg competition in taekwondo at the 2021 Islamic Solidarity Games was held on 12 August 2021 at the Selcuk University 19 Mayis Sport Hall in Konya.

== Results ==
Legend

- PTG — Won by Points Gap
- SUP — Won by superiority
- OT — Won on over time (Golden Point)
- DQ — Won by disqualification
- PUN — Won by punitive declaration
- WD — Won by withdrawal

=== Final ===
Final
Ahmad Bahlool (PLE)	0
Amir Mohammad Bakhshi (IRI)	2

=== Top half ===
Round of 32
Assanie Boukar (CHA)
Moukoury William Junior (CMR)

Round of 16
Muhammed Emin Yıldız (TUR)
(25x17px)
Ahmad Almuwallad (KSA)
Zeinoun Marc (LBN)
Abdurakhmon Maripov (KAZ)
Mugweri Christopher (UGA)
Osanando Khairudin (INA)
Ahmad Bahlool (PLE)

Quarterfinals
Muhammed Emin Yıldız (TUR)
(25x17px)
(25x17px)
Ahmad Bahlool (PLE)

Semifinals
Muhammed Emin Yıldız (TUR)
Ahmad Bahlool (PLE)

=== Bottom half ===
Round of 32
Muhammadhasan Shomahmadov (TJK)
Mohammad Shalan (QAT)

Round of 16
Amir Mohammad Bakhshi (IRI)	2
Tosh van Dijk (SUR)	0
Omar Alhlo (JOR)
Abdalaziz Abdalla (SUD)
Moussa Amar Cisse (GAB)
Mahammad Mammadov (AZE)
(25x17px)
Jasurbek Jaysunov (UZB)

Quarterfinals
Amir Mohammad Bakhshi (IRI)	2
Omar Alhlo (JOR)	0
(25x17px)
Jasurbek Jaysunov (UZB)

Semifinals
Amir Mohammad Bakhshi (IRI)	2
Jasurbek Jaysunov (UZB)	1
