= Margaret Sordahl =

Naturalist for the Smithsonian Astrophysical Observatory

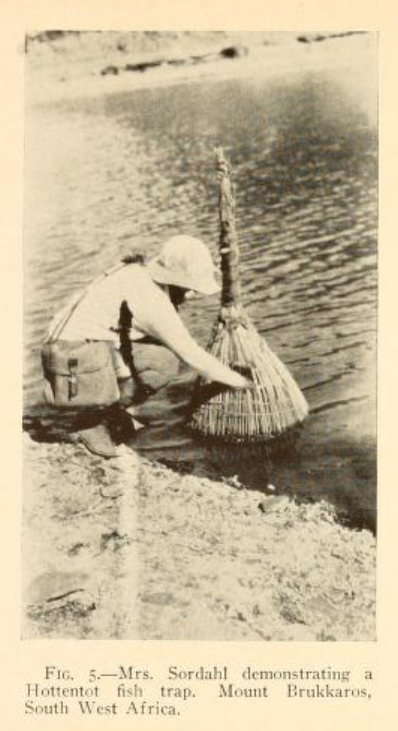
- Born: 1906; Milan
- Died: 1995 (aged 88–89); Galveston
- Occupation: Naturalist, scientific collector, botanical collector
- Employer: Smithsonian Astrophysical Observatory (1929–1932)

Margaret Sordahl (1906 – 1995) was an ornithologist who worked for the Smithsonian Astrophysical Observatory. She collected two holotype specimens, Erythropygia coryphaeus abboti and Serinus albogularis sordahlae, the latter of which was named in her honour.

== Biography ==
Margaret Froiland was born in 1906 in Milan. She married Lois Sordahl, who became Field Director for the Smithsonian Astrophysical Observatory. The couple met at St. Olaf College.

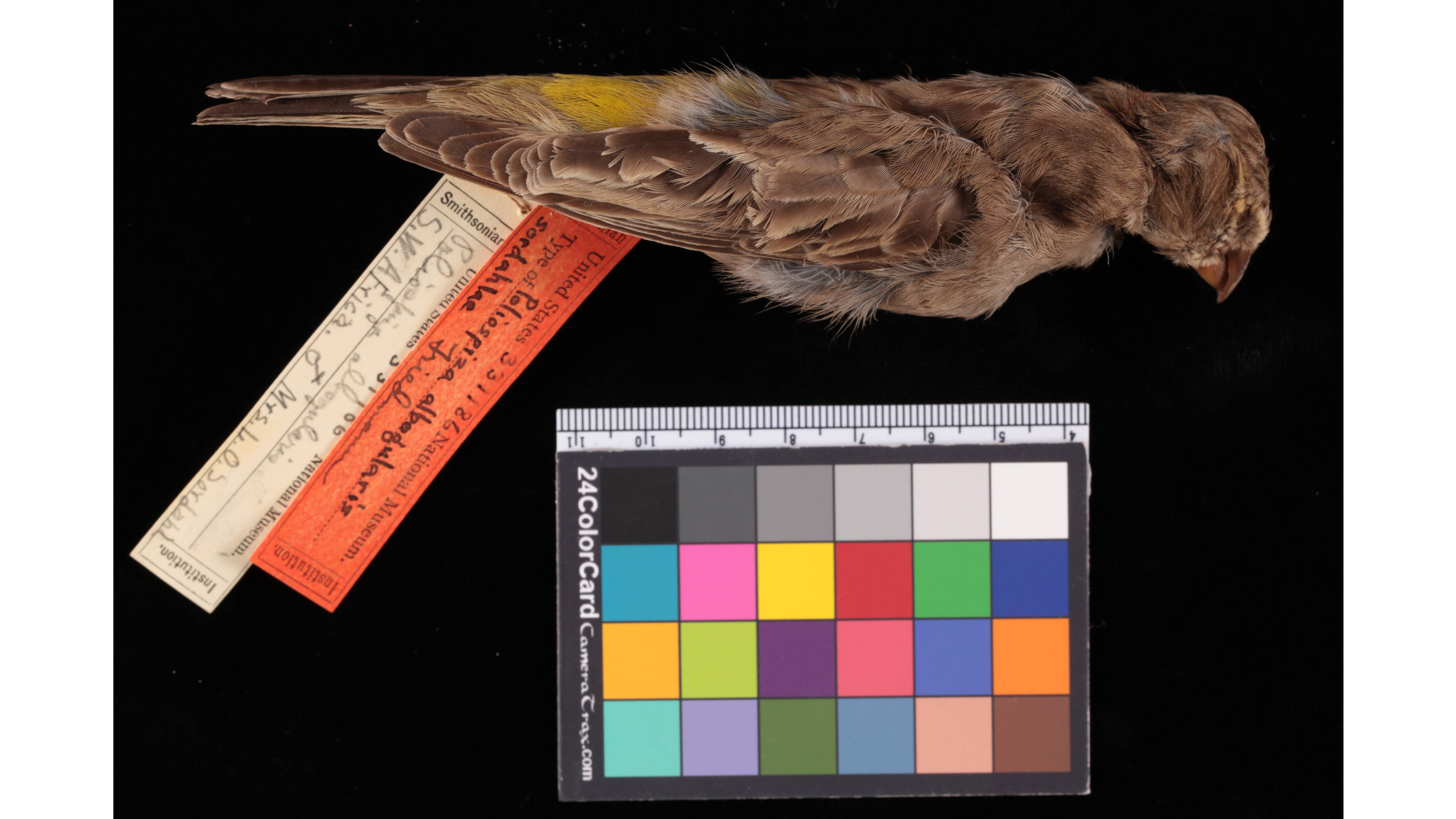
Serinus albogularis sordahlae holotype specimen collected by Margaret Sordahl.

Whilst the couple were stationed at the Smithsonian's Brukkaros Solar Observatory in Namibia, Sordahl collected many specimen's for the museum's natural science collections, including the holotype for a species of canary, Serinus albogularis sordahlae. The species was subsequently named after her. As an eponym, she was honoured since she "maintained her interest in zoological collecting under rather trying and difficult circumstances". She described the bird and its behaviour, stating that "these birds stay on the mountains during the whole year, living on top of the mountain during the hottest months of the year".

Sordahl also collected another new species of robin, Erythropygia coryphaeus abboti, which was named after Charles G. Abbot, who was Director of the Smithsonian. Twenty-seven species were collected by her - ten were new to the Smithsonian's collection and two were new to science. Other birds collected, included a starling, a shrike that "whistles like boys", a bulbul and other desert-dwelling species. Margaret's brother also accompanied the couple to Namibia.

== Death and legacy ==
Margaret Sordahl died in 1995 in Friendswood. Her field notebook and other archival material relating to her time in Namibia, is held by the Smithsonian Institution Archives.
