= Brukkaros Mountain =

Mountain in Namibia

Brukkaros
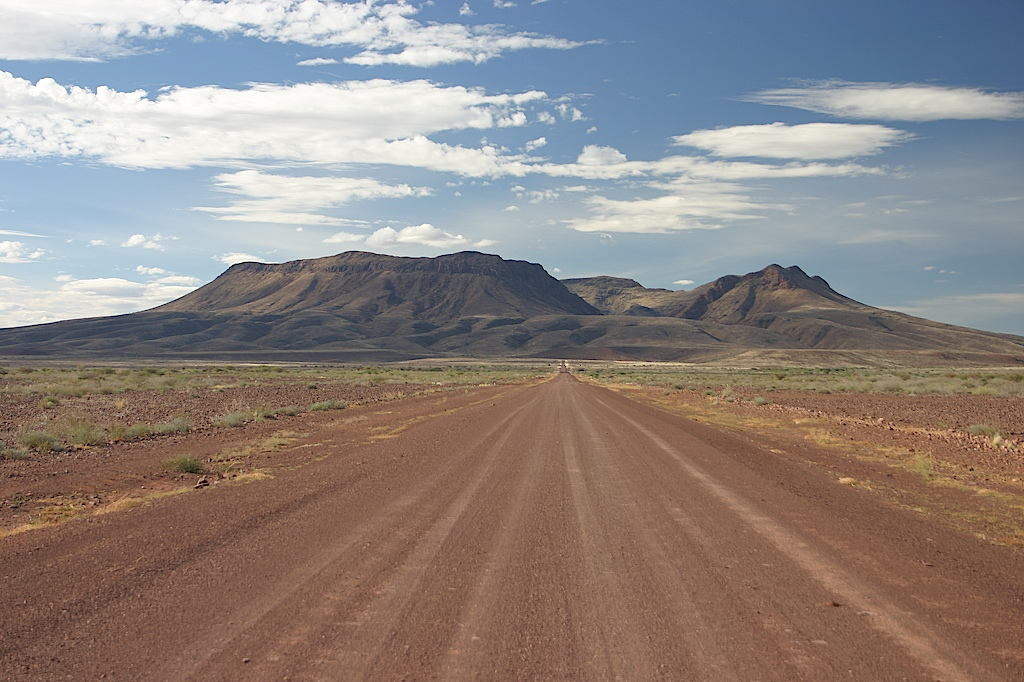
- Brukkaros Mountain from the south

Highest point
- Elevation: 1,590 m (5,220 ft)
- Coordinates: 25°52′02″S 017°46′53″E

Geography
- Location within Namibia
- Location: Namibia

Geology
- Mountain type: Dome

Climbing
- Easiest route: Hike

Brukkaros Mountain (Khoekhoe: Geitsi Gubib) is a collapsed caldera in the Berseba Constituency of ǁKaras Region, Namibia. Measuring 1,590 metres at its peak on the eastern edge of the crater, Brukkaros is located about 15 kilometres northeast of the primarily Nama town of Berseba and 100 kilometres north-northwest of Keetmanshoop. It is over 650 metres taller than the surrounding area, but the crater floor is 350 m below the rim.

== Description ==
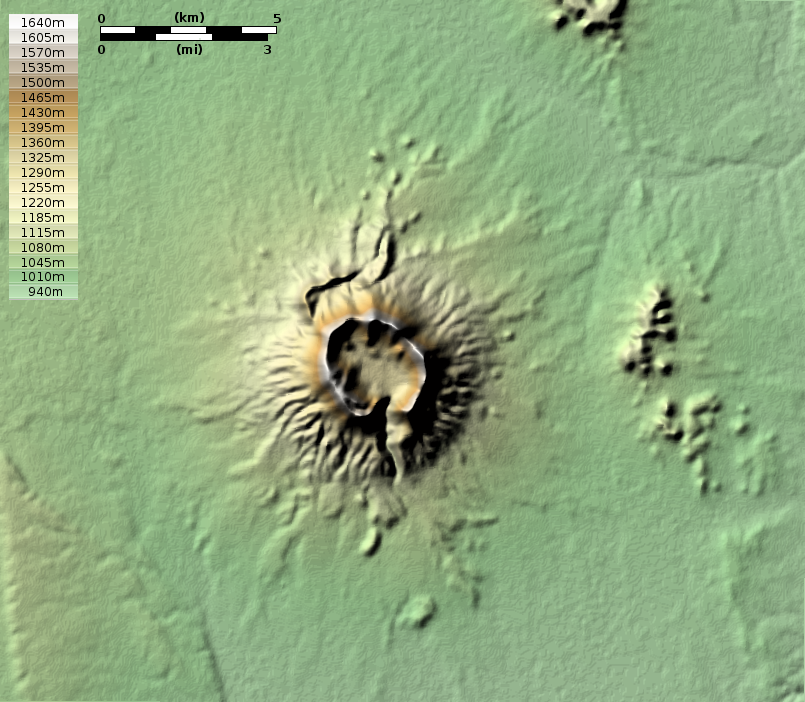
Shaded relief map of Brukkaros Mountain

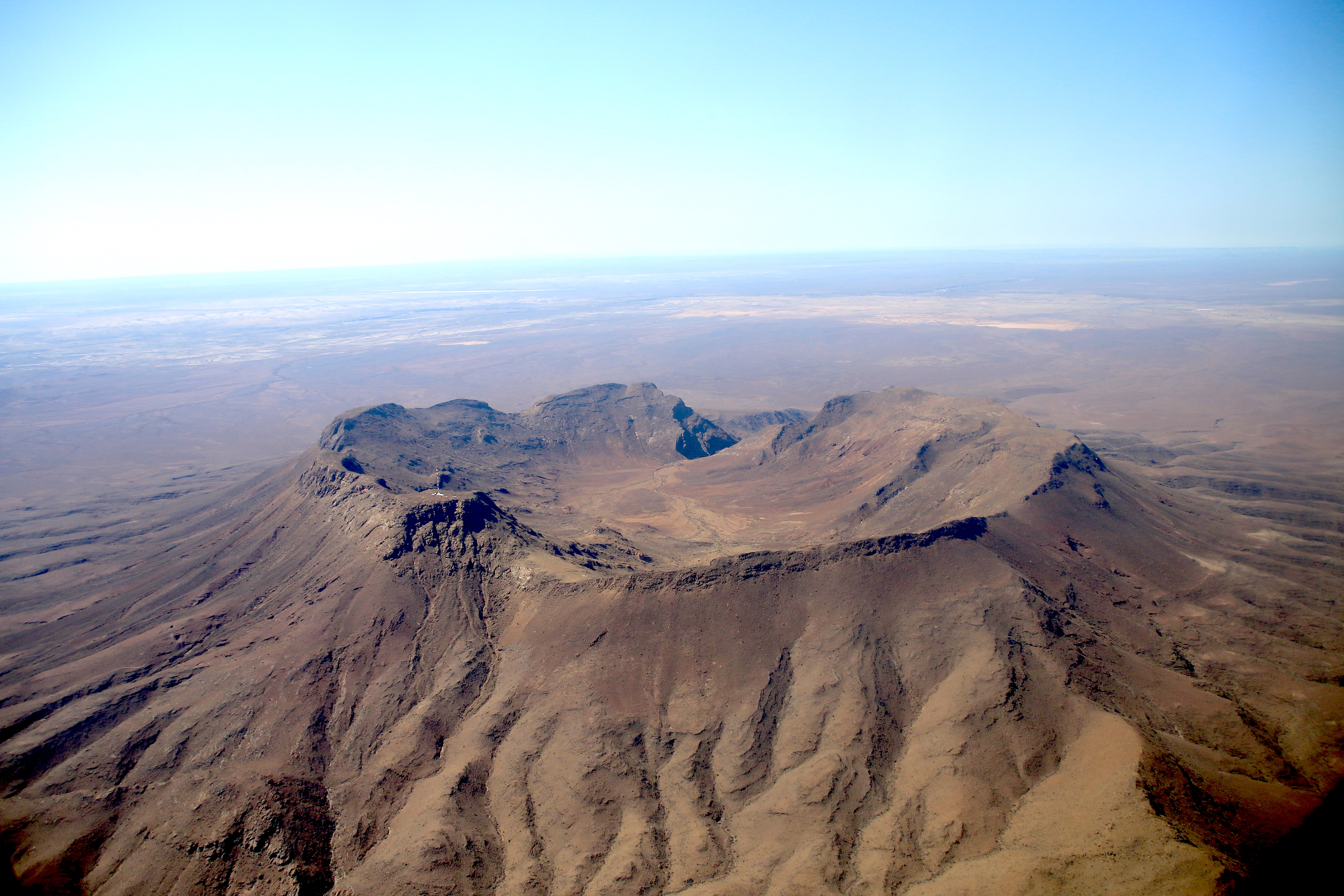
Brukkaros Bird's Eye View (2019)

The mountain is a large caldera, in the form of a ring mountain (a so-called tuff ring) with a diameter of about 4 km and has been formed by an explosion when rising magma met groundwater and superheated it. It is formed of an indistinctly bedded red-brown microbreccia, made up of finely fragmented rocks of the Nama System that were blown out when the caldera collapsed about 80 million years ago. The breccia layers slope inwards (unlike the slope around a volcanic crater), and removal of the softer upper layers by erosion has created the central hollow. The hollow is drained by a stream which runs southwards through the ring mountain in a narrow valley. The route into the interior of the mountain is along this valley. At its head is a dry waterfall, over which the stream plunges down some 45 m after rain, and the river bed directly below the fall is the principal source of water.

Quiver trees grow extensively on the crater floor. Due to the absence of drinking water and mobile phone service and difficult road access, travel to Brukkaros is difficult.

== Etymology ==
The Nama called the mountain Geitsi Gubib after the long, flowing loincloth worn by Khoikhoi women, known in Afrikaans as broek-en-karos ("trousers and kaross"), rendered in German to Brukkaros.

== History ==
Berseba was founded nearby by the Rhenish Missionary, Samuel Hahn in 1850. A heliograph station operated under German administration. From 1926–1931, the National Geographic Society, in cooperation with the Smithsonian Institution, ran the Brukkaros Solar Observatory on the mountain to measure daily solar radiation. Arthur Bleksley worked there during the period. Whilst her husband ran the observatory in the early 1930s, ornithologist Margaret Sordahl collected natural science specimens for the museum.

== See also ==
- Geology of Namibia
- Brukkaros Pygmy Rock Mouse
- NS Brukkaros (C13), a Namibian Navy patrol boat named after the mountain
