= Frederick Atwood Greeley =

American astronomer

Frederick Atwood Greeley (26 November 1896 in Pelham, New Hampshire – 19 March 1980 in Laguna Hills, California) was an American astronomer who worked on the solar constant program of the Smithsonian Astrophysical Observatory (SAO), which had been started by Samuel Pierpont Langley. Greeley was a second cousin of Charles Greeley Abbot.

After graduating from a high school in Nashua, New Hampshire in 1916, Greeley joined up with the United States Army. His career as a soldier lasted only a few months and ended when the armistice was signed on 11 November 1918.

The Smithsonian had established a network of high-altitude stations around the globe - Mount Montezuma (9,500 ft) near Calama in Antofagasta Province, Chile (later shut down because of air pollution by surrounding mines), Mount Harqua Hala (5,800 ft) in Arizona (later moved to Table Mountain at Swartout, California), and lastly Mount Brukkaros in South West Africa (Namibia), a site selected by Charles Greeley Abbot, and later moved to Mount St. Katherine, highest mountain on the Sinai Peninsula. Greeley's tours of duty as station director included all these stations as well as one at sea level in Miami, Florida. His brother, Paul Greeley, also served at Mount Montezuma from 1920 to 1922, while Olive Greeley joined Frederick there during his 1942-46 stay.

He married Olive Adelia Troup (born 10 June 1901, in Maxwell, Iowa; died 21 May 1982, Laguna Hills, California), on 10 June 1937, at Riverside, California.

Frederick Greeley retired from the SAO on 1 December 1956, after 36 years of service. After retirement he lived in Redlands, California between 1957-1970, and Laguna Hills, California from 1970 to his death in 1980.
