= Marko Golubić =

Croatian taekwondo practitioner

Personal information
- Nationality: Croatian
- Born: 26 July 2000 (age 26)

Sport
- Sport: Taekwondo
- Weight class: Lightweight
Medal record
Men's taekwondo
Representing Croatia
World Championships
Gold medal – first place	2023 Baku	74 kg
European Championships
Bronze medal – third place	2026 Munich	74 kg
Mediterranean Games
Bronze medal – third place	2026 Taranto	68 kg

Marko Golubić (born 26 July 2000) is a Croatian taekwondo practitioner. He was a gold medalist at the 2023 World Taekwondo Championships in the men's lightweight division. He competed for Croatia in that division at the 2024 Olympic Games.

== Career ==
He is a member of TK Metalac in Zagreb, where he is coached by Dejan Mesarov.

He competed for Croatia at the 2022 European Taekwondo Championships in Manchester, England, and the 2022 World Taekwondo Championships in Guadalajara, Mexico, and reached the medal match each time without winning a medal. He also lost in the bronze medal match at the 2023 European Games to Daniel Quesada of Spain.

He won the gold medal in the Men's lightweight division at the 2023 World Taekwondo Championships in Baku, Azerbaijan, defeating Stefan Takov of Serbia in the final. It had been Takov who denied him a medal in the bronze medal bout at the previous world championships. The result meant, that after Filip Grgić in 2007, Golubić became just the second male world champion produced by Croatia, and along with Ana Zaninović and Lena Stojković, only the fourth overall.

Competing at the European Qualification Tournament in March 2024 he qualified for the 2024 Olympic Games in Paris, France, by defeating Sweden's Ali Alian to reach the final. Competing at the subsequent Olympic Games, he narrowly missed a place in the semi-finals, losing a deciding set against Bradly Sinden of Great Britain who carried on fighting despite a suspected knee ligament tear during the bout.

He placed second in the -74kgg category at the Galeb Trophy Taekwondo Open in April 2025 in Belgrade, Serbia.

In May 2026, he was a bronze medalist at the 2026 European Taekwondo Championships in Munich, Germany.
