= Arbnor Bajra =

Belgian-Kosovar taekwondo athlete

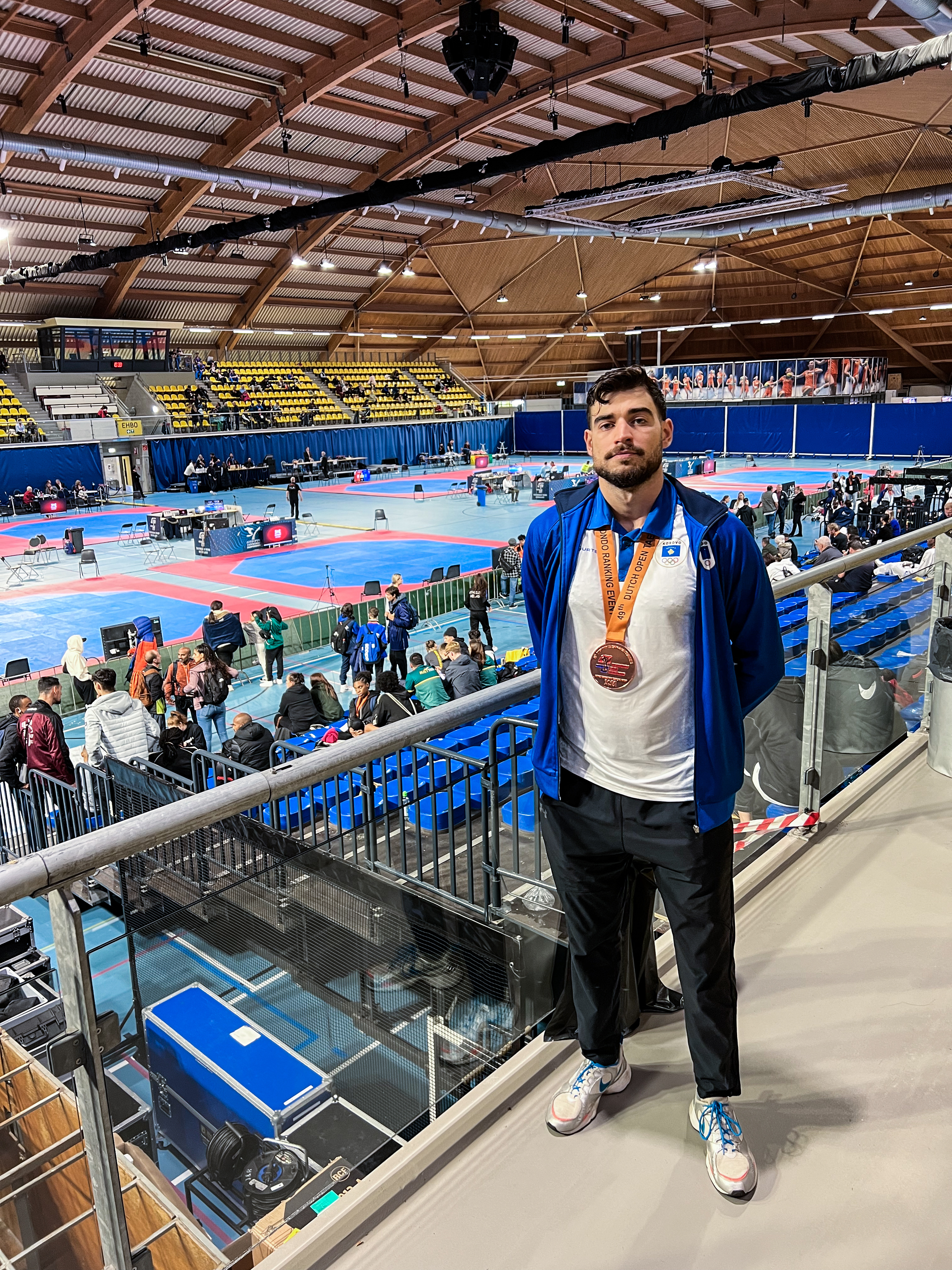
- Arbnor Bajra in Dutch Open 2022

Personal information
- Native name: Arbnor Bajra
- National team: Belgium (until 2021); Kosovo (from 2021)
- Citizenship: Kosovo; Belgium
- Born: 19 August 1992 (age 33) Gjilan, FR Yugoslavia (now Kosovo)
- Height: 1.86 m (6 ft 1 in)

Sport
- Sport: Taekwondo
- Rank: 38th World Ranking

Achievements and titles
- World finals: 17th
Medal record
Gold medal – first place	2015 Belgium Champion	68 kg
Gold medal – first place	2016 Belgium Champion	68 kg
Gold medal – first place	2018 Belgium Champion	74 kg
Gold medal – first place	2021 Kosovo Champion	74 kg
Bronze medal – third place	2022 Croatia Open	74 kg
Bronze medal – third place	2022 Dutch Open	74 kg

Arbnor Bajra (born 19 August 1992 in Gjilan, Kosovo) is a Belgian-Kosovar taekwondo athlete.

Arbnor Bajra is a part of the Kosovo Olympic taekwondo team and is competing to qualify for the next Olympic Games in Paris 2024.

== Career ==
Arbnor was three times Belgian senior champion.

In 2021, Arbnor choose to fight for Kosovo and in 2022 he competed in a new weight category at lightweight (-74 kg), in which he became ranked 38th in the world.

At the 2022 European Championships, he won his first fight against Amer Abdullah from Denmark before losing in the round of 32 against Nedžad Husić from Bosnia, who finnieshed as the silver medallist.

That same year, he qualified for the World Championships during which he won his first round against Sri Lankan Dewayal Delara by disqualification and then lost against Muhammed Emin Yıldız from Turkey in the round of 32 over three rounds.

He qualified for the 2023 World Championships in Baku, Azerbaidjan.

== Results ==
=== World Championships ===
- 17th place at the 2022 World Championships in -74 kg.

=== European Championships ===
- 9th place at the 2022 European Championships in -74 kg.

=== National championships ===
- (gold) Gold medal at the Belgian Championship 2015 in -68 kg.
- (gold) Gold medal at the 2016 Belgian Championship in -68 kg.
- (gold) Gold medal at the 2018 Belgian Championship in -74 kg.
- (gold) Gold medal and best competitor at the Kosovo Championship 2021 in -74 kg.

=== Opens International ===
- (bronze) Bronze medal at the Croatian Open.
- (bronze) Bronze medal at the Dutch Open.
