= Taekwondo at the 2019 Pan American Games – Men's 68 kg =

Taekwondo – Men's 68 kg at the 2019 Pan American Games
- Venue: Polideportivo Callao
- Dates: July 28
- Competitors: 15 from 15 nations

Medalists
Gold medal	Edival Pontes; Brazil
Silver medal	Bernardo Pié; Dominican Republic
Bronze medal	Ignacio Morales; Chile
Bronze medal	Hervan Nkogho-Mengue; Canada

The men's 68 kg competition of the taekwondo events at the 2019 Pan American Games took place on July 28 at the Polideportivo Callao.

== Results ==
=== Main bracket ===
The final results were:

Preliminary round
David Paz (COL)	15
Juan Soto (CRC)	16
Ignacio Morales (CHI)	DSQ
Tosh van Dijk (SUR)
Carlos Caicedo (ECU)	15
Braulio León (PER)	17
Bernardo Pié (DOM)	16
Jorge Hernández (PUR)	4
Brandon Sealy (JAM)	18
Carl Nickolas (USA)	25
Hervan Nkogho-Mengue (CAN)	24
Justin Choy (GUY)	4
Rogelio López (CUB)	6
José Nava (MEX)	27

Quarterfinals
Edival Pontes (BRA)	30
Juan Soto (CRC)	17
Ignacio Morales (CHI)	20
Braulio León (PER)	5
Bernardo Pié (DOM)	10
Carl Nickolas (USA)	9
Hervan Nkogho-Mengue (CAN)	16
José Nava (MEX)	12

Semifinals
Edival Pontes (BRA)	18
Ignacio Morales (CHI)	7
Bernardo Pié (DOM)	18
Hervan Nkogho-Mengue (CAN)	7

Gold medal match
Edival Pontes (BRA)	17
Bernardo Pié (DOM)	14

=== Repechage ===
Semifinal			Bronze medal match
			1	Ignacio Morales (CHI)	30
2	Carl Nickolas (USA)	21		Carl Nickolas (USA)	11
3	Jorge Hernández (PUR)	6

Bronze medal match
Juan Soto (CRC)	12
Hervan Nkogho-Mengue (CAN)	13
