= Ferdinando Cazzamalli =

Italian psychiatrist (1887–1958)

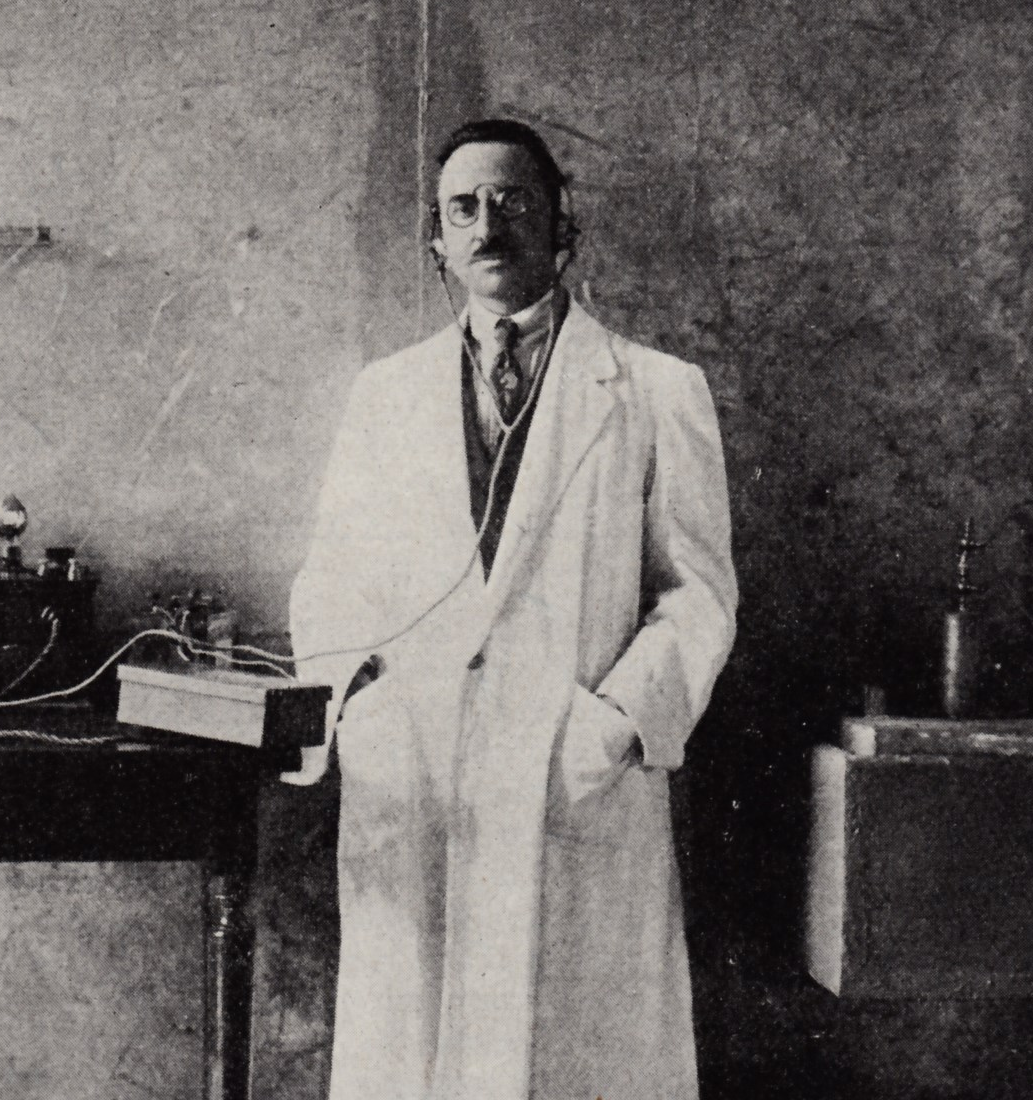
Ferdinando Cazzamalli

Ferdinando Cazzamalli (August 4, 1887 in Crema, Italy – 1958) was an Italian psychiatrist from Crema, Lombardy who was interested in paranormal phenomena.

== Biography ==
Cazzamalli was the director of a psychiatric hospital in Como, but later became a lecturer in psychiatry at the university of Modena, which employed Cazzamalli for 20 years together with electrical engineer Eugenio Gnesutta to work with psychologically disturbed patients, where they also investigating physical accounts of telepathy.

They created equipment to measure ultra-high-frequency waves to explain the phenomena of telepathy as electromagnetic effects on the brain. Cazzamalli conducted experiments with a radio receiver enclosed in a Faraday cage, and came to the conclusion that there were paranormal phenomena.

In 1937 Cazzamalli founded, together with Giovanni Schepis, Emilio Servadio, and Luigi Sanguineti, the Italian Society of Metaphysics (SIM), the first group in Italy to study paranormal activity full-time. The Italian fascist state recognized this group in 1941. The group was later renamed in 1955 to the Italian Society of Parapsychology. In 1946 the society released its first magazine, called "Metaphysics". Due to political and methodological differences, Cazzamalli left the society in order to create his own group, the Italian Associated Scientists of Metaphysics.

== Works ==
- Problemi di vita manicomiale, Imola: Galeati, 1916
- Guerra, follia e degenerazione, Milano: Avanti, 1921
- La tabe dorsale alla luce delle moderne conoscenze, Bergamo: Savoldi, 1926
- Dalla metapsichica al pane quotidiano: Articoli, Como: C. Nani, 1934
- Di un fenomeno radiante cerebropsichico (riflesso cerebropsicoradiante) come mezzo di esplorazione psicobiofisica, in: Giornale di Psichiatria e di Neuropatologia (1935)
- Metapsichica, neurobiologia e metodo sperimentale: Dalla metapsichica alla psicobiofisica, in: Giornale di Psichiatria e di neuropatologia, fasc. 3-4 (1939)
- I fenomeni elettromagnetici radianti dal soggetto umano in intensa attivita (orgasmo funzionale) psicosensoriale del cervello, il metodo sperimentale e il prof. Agostino Gemelli, in: Giornale di Psichiatria e neuropatologia, fasc. 1-2 (1942)
- L'avventura di Giuseppe Massarenti: per la liberta e la dignita del cittadino, Bologna: S.T.E.B., 1946
- La Madonna di Bonate: apparizioni o visioni? Milano: Bocca, 1951
- Il cervello radiante: fenomeni elettromagnetici radianti dal cervello umano durante l'intensa attivita psicosensoriale degli stati onirici, allucinatori e telepsichici, Milano: Ceschina, 1960
- The Radiating Brain, 1960
- Le Cerveau Émetteur, ISBN 2-87211-016-X, Belgium: Collection Résurgence, 1998
