= Kyrylo Hurnov =

Ukrainian taekwondo practitioner (born 2003)

Personal information
- Nationality: Ukraine
- Born: 29 November 2003 (age 22) Kyiv, Ukraine

Sport
- Sport: Taekwondo
- Event: 80 kg
- Club: Spartak Kyiv
- Coached by: V. Andriievskyi
Medal record
Men's taekwondo
Representing Ukraine
European Championships
Silver medal – second place	2026 Munich	80 kg
Summer World University Games
Bronze medal – third place	2025 Essen	80 kg

Kyrylo Hurnov (Ukrainian: Кирило Гурнов; born 29 November 2003) is a Ukrainian taekwondo practitioner. He is 2025 World University Games bronze medallist.

At the 2025 World Championships, Hurnov reached round of 32.

== Personal life ==
Hurnov studied at the Taras Shevchenko National University of Kyiv.
