= Artem Mytarev =

Russian taekwondo practitioner (born 2003)

Personal information
- Native name: Артем Мытарев
- Full name: Artem Pavlovich Mytarev
- Nationality: Russian
- Born: 14 June 2003 (age 23)

Sport
- Sport: Taekwondo
- Weight class: 80 kg
Medal record
Men's taekwondo
Representing Individual Neutral Athletes
World Championships
Bronze medal – third place	2025 Wuxi	80 kg

Artem Pavlovich Mytarev (Russian: Артём Павлович Мытарев; born 14 June 2003) is a Russian taekwondo practitioner. He won a bronze medal at the 2025 World Taekwondo Championships.

== Career ==
In April 2025, Mytarev competed at the Russian Taekwondo Championships and won a gold medal in the 80 kg category. The next month he competed at the 10th World Taekwondo Presidents Cup in Sofia, Bulgaria, and won a silver medal in the 80 kg category. In October 2025, he competed at the 2025 World Taekwondo Championships and won a bronze medal in the 80 kg category, losing to eventual gold medalist Henrique Marques in the semifinals.
