= Leon Sejranovic =

Australian taekwondo practitioner

Personal information
- Nationality: Australian
- Born: 12 July 2002 (age 23)

Sport
- Sport: Taekwondo
- Weight class: Lightweight
Medal record
Men's taekwondo
Representing Australia
World Championships
Bronze medal – third place	2023 Baku	74kg

Leon Sejranovic (born 12 July 2002) is an Australian taekwondo practitioner. He was a bronze medalist at the 2023 World Taekwondo Championships.

== Early life ==
From Victoria, he started in taekwondo at three years-old. He attended Maribyrnong Sports Academy in Melbourne.

He developed his taekwondo at Notorious Martial Arts, before joining the Combat Institute of Australia National Performance Centre program for Taekwondo.

== Career ==
He reached the last-16 competing for Australia at the 2022 World Taekwondo Championships in Guadalajara. In 2022, he won gold at both the Oceania Championships and Tahiti Open.

He won the bronze medal in the Men's lightweight division at the 2023 World Taekwondo Championships in Baku in June 2023, defeating reigning world champion Daniel Quesada in the last 16 before he was beaten in the semi-finals by Croatia's eventual winner Marko Golubić.

In April 2024, at the Oceania Taekwondo Qualifying tournament, he secured a place at the 2024 Olympic Games in Paris.
