= Edival Pontes =

Brazilian taekwondo practitioner

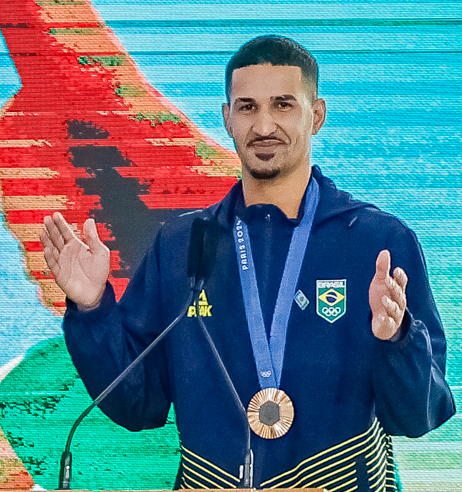
- Pontes in 2024

Personal information
- Full name: Edival Marques Quirino Pontes
- Nickname: Netinho
- Nationality: Brazilian
- Born: 11 October 1997 (age 28) João Pessoa, Paraíba
- Height: 187 cm (6 ft 2 in)
- Weight: 68 kg (150 lb)

Sport
- Sport: Taekwondo
- University team: Paraíba State University
- Coached by: Diego Ribeiro
Medal record
Men's taekwondo`
Representing Brazil
Olympic Games
| Bronze medal – third place | 2024 Paris | 68 kg |
World Championships
| Silver medal – second place | 2022 Guadalajara | 74 kg |
| Silver medal – second place | 2025 Wuxi | 74 kg |
Grand Prix
| Silver medal – second place | 2023 Paris | 68 kg |
| Bronze medal – third place | 2018 Moscow | 68 kg |
| Bronze medal – third place | 2018 Taoyuan | 68 kg |
| Bronze medal – third place | 2019 Chiba | 68 kg |
Pan American Games
| Gold medal – first place | 2019 Lima | 68 kg |
| Gold medal – first place | 2023 Santiago | Team |
Pan American Championships
| Gold medal – first place | 2018 Spokane | 68 kg |
| Gold medal – first place | 2022 Punta Cana | 74 kg |
| Silver medal – second place | 2016 Queretaro | 68 kg |
South American Games
| Silver medal – second place | 2022 Asunción | 68 kg |
Military World Games
| Gold medal – first place | 2019 Wuhan | 68 kg |
Youth Olympic Games
| Gold medal – first place | 2014 Nanjing | 63 kg |
World Junior Championships
| Gold medal – first place | 2014 Taipei | 63 kg |

Edival Marques Quirino Pontes (born 11 October 1997), also known as Netinho, is a Brazilian taekwondo athlete. He won the bronze medal in the 68 kg at the 2024 Summer Olympics in Paris, the silver medal in the men's lightweight event at the 2022 World Taekwondo Championships held in Guadalajara, and a gold medal at the 2014 Summer Youth Olympics in Nanjing, in the under 63 kg weight category.

== Career ==
Pontes' father, an amateur football athlete, took his son to football school when he was five years old. Pontes discovered taekwondo two years later, fell in love with the South Korean fight and changed sports. At 12 years old, Edival was already starting to win Brazilian Championships.

At the 2014 World Juniors Taekwondo Championships, at the age of 16, Pontes became junior world champion, obtaining the gold medal.

At the 2014 Summer Youth Olympics, at the age of 16, he won a gold medal in the 63 kg category.

At the 2016 Pan American Taekwondo Championships, Pontes won the silver medal in the 68 kg category.

Debuting in the world championships at number 38 in the world rankings, Pontes participated in the 2017 World Taekwondo Championships. He reached the round of 16, where he had to face the Korean Lee Dae-hoon, holder of two Olympic medals and two-time champion world, and was eliminated. The Korean won his third world championship in this tournament.

At the 2018 Pan American Taekwondo Championships, Pontes won the gold medal in the 68 kg category, becoming champion of the competition for the first time.

At the 2019 World Taekwondo Championships, Pontes repeated his 2017 campaign, reaching the round of 16.

In 2019, at 21 years old, Pontes obtained his greatest title when he became champion of the 2019 Pan American Games. He won the gold medal at the 68 kg category, defeating Bernardo Pié, from the Dominican Republic, in the final, in an exciting and comeback fight by 17 to 14. Since 2007, the country has not won a gold medal in the sport at the Pan American Games.

Pontes was called up for the pre-Olympics in March 2020. Each country can send only two athletes per gender to the pre-Olympics, despite taekwondo having four categories at the Olympics. The Brazilian Taekwondo Confederation called up Ícaro Miguel (up to 80kg) and Edival Pontes (up to 68kg). Ícaro and Edival closed the world Olympic classification ranking in ninth place in their respective categories.

At the 2020 Summer Olympics, Edival, making his Olympic debut, ended up losing on his debut to Turkish Hakan Recber 25-18, in the round of 16 of the under-68kg category. With the result, he had to wait for the outcome of the Turk's campaign to find out if he could compete in the repechage and fight for bronze. Hakan fell in the quarterfinals to Britain's Bradly Sinden.

At the 2022 Pan American Taekwondo Championships, Edival won the gold medal in the 74 kg category, becoming champion of the competition for the second time.

At the 2022 South American Games, he won a silver medal in the 68 kg category.

At the 2022 World Taekwondo Championships, Pontes became world runner-up, obtaining silver in the under-74 kg category. At 25 years old, it was his first medal in adult World Championships. Edival sought to be the second Brazilian to win a world title in taekwondo, equaling Natália Falavigna, champion in 2005.

At the 2023 Pan American Games, the men's team, formed by Edival Pontes, Maicon Andrade and Paulo Melo, won an unprecedented gold medal for the country, after a comeback over Cuba in the semifinals, with a 76-60 triumph, and a victory over Chile 48 to 16

In the 2024 Summer Olympics, Pontes lost his first match to Zaid Kareem, but was allowed into the repechage once Kareem reached the final. After winning a rematch against Hakan Recber, he got to the bronze medal match opposite Javier Pérez Polo, and with his win became the third Brazilian with a taekwondo medal after Natália Falavigna and Maicon de Andrade.
