= Smithsonian Astrophysical Observatory =

Astronomical observatory in Massachusetts, US

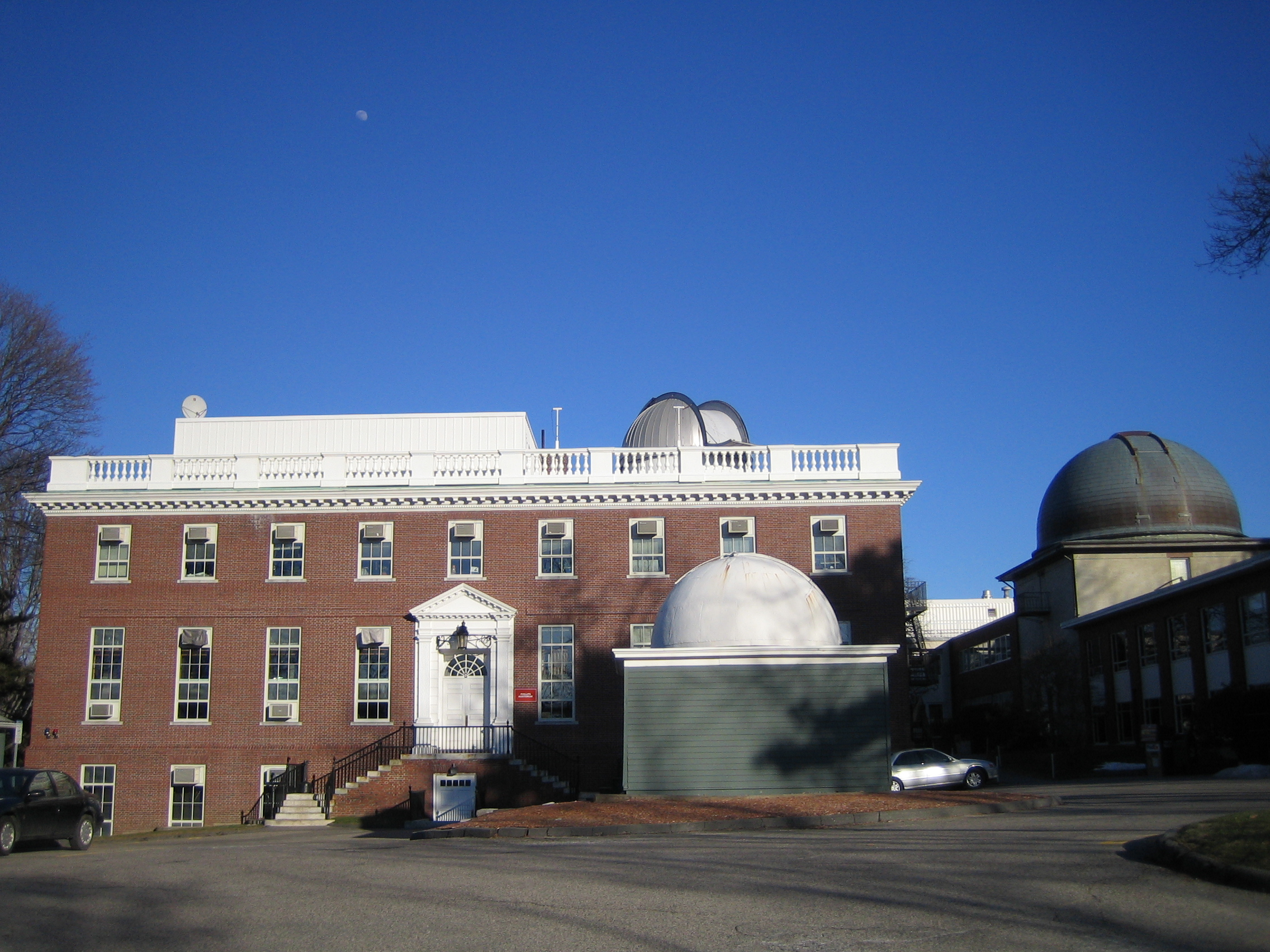
- The Center for Astrophysics | Harvard & Smithsonian (CfA) Headquarters in Cambridge, Massachusetts. The Smithsonian Astrophysical Observatory (SAO) has been joined with the CfA since 1973.
- Abbreviation: SAO
- Established: 1890
- Purpose: Research in astronomy, astrophysics, Earth, and space sciences
- Headquarters: 60 Garden Street, Cambridge, Massachusetts, United States
- Director: Lisa Kewley
- Staff: 850+
- Website: www.cfa.harvard.edu

The Smithsonian Astrophysical Observatory (SAO) is a research institute of the Smithsonian Institution, concentrating on astrophysical studies including galactic and extragalactic astronomy, cosmology, solar, earth and planetary sciences, theory and instrumentation, using observations at wavelengths from the highest energy gamma rays to the radio, along with gravitational waves. Established in Washington, D.C., in 1890, the SAO moved its headquarters in 1955 to Cambridge, Massachusetts, where its research is a collaboration with the Harvard College Observatory (HCO) and the Harvard University Department of Astronomy. In 1973, the Smithsonian and Harvard formalized the collaboration as the Center for Astrophysics | Harvard & Smithsonian (CfA) under a single Director.

== History ==
Samuel Pierpont Langley, the third secretary of the Smithsonian, founded the Smithsonian Astrophysical Observatory on the south yard of the Smithsonian Castle (on the U.S. National Mall) on March 1,1890. The Astrophysical Observatory's initial, primary purpose was to "record the amount and character of the Sun's heat". Charles Greeley Abbot was named SAO's first director, and the observatory operated solar telescopes to take daily measurements of the Sun's intensity in different regions of the optical electromagnetic spectrum. In doing so, the observatory enabled Abbot to make critical refinements to the Solar constant, as well as to serendipitously discover Solar variability. It is likely that SAO's early history as a solar observatory was part of the inspiration behind the Smithsonian's "sunburst" logo, designed in 1965 by Crimilda Pontes.

In 1955, the scientific headquarters of SAO moved from Washington, D.C. to Cambridge, Massachusetts to affiliate with the Harvard College Observatory (HCO). Fred Lawrence Whipple, then the chairman of the Harvard Astronomy Department, was named the new director of SAO. The collaborative relationship between SAO and HCO therefore predates the official creation of the CfA by 18 years. SAO's move to Harvard's campus also resulted in a rapid expansion of its research program. Following the launch of Sputnik (the world's first human-made satellite) in 1957, SAO accepted a national challenge to create a worldwide satellite-tracking network, collaborating with the United States Air Force on Project Space Track.

With the creation of NASA the following year and throughout the space race, SAO led major efforts in the development of orbiting observatories and large ground-based telescopes, laboratory and theoretical astrophysics, as well as the application of computers to astrophysical problems.

== Directors ==
The followings persons served as director of the Smithsonian Astrophysical Observatory:

No.	Image	SAO Director	Term start	Term end	Ref.
Established in 1890 in Washington, D.C.
1		Samuel Pierpont Langley (Note: Also became Secretary of the Smithsonian Institution.)	March 1, 1890	February 27, 1906 (Note: Died in office.)	
2		Charles Greeley Abbot	1906	1942	
3		Loyal Blaine Aldrich	1942	1955	
Headquarters relocated in 1955 to Cambridge, Massachusetts
4		Fred Lawrence Whipple	1955	1973	
The Harvard–Smithsonian Center for Astrophysics was formed on July 1, 1973
5		George B. Field	July 1, 1973	1982	
6		Irwin I. Shapiro	1982	2004	
7		Charles R. Alcock	August 1, 2004	January 1, 2022	
8		Lisa Kewley	July 1, 2022	present	

Table notes:

== Remote stations ==
SAO has operated a number of remote stations over the years.

Station	Type	Latitude	Longitude	El. (m)	Opened	Closed	Coordinates
Mount Wilson, California	Solar	34º13'N	118º56'W	1737	1908	1920	34°13′N 118°56′W
Hump Mountain, North Carolina	Solar	36º8'N	82º0'W	1500	1917	1918	36°8′N 82°00′W
Calama, Chile	Solar	22º28'S	68º56'W	2250	1918	1920	22°28′S 68°56′W
Mount Montezuma, Chile	Solar	22º40'S	68º56'W	2711	1920	?	22°40′S 68°56′W
Mount Harquahala, Arizona	Solar	33º48'N	113º20'W	1721	1920	1925	33°48′N 113°20′W
Table Mountain, California	Solar	34º22'N	117º41'W	2286	1925	1962	34°22′N 117°41′W
Mount Brukkaros, Namibia	Solar	25º52'S	17º48'E	1586	1926	1931	25°52′S 17°48′E
Mount Saint Catherine, Egypt	Solar	28º31'N	33º56'E	2591	1934	1937	28°31′N 33°56′E
Burro Mountain, New Mexico	Solar	32º40'N	108º33'W	2440	1938	1946	32°40′N 108°33′W
Organ Pass, New Mexico	Space Track	32º25'N	106º33'W				32°25′N 106°33′W
Parnamirim, Brazil	Space Track	05º55'S	35º09'W	390	1966	1976	05°55′S 35°09′W
Olifantsfontein, South Africa	Space Track	25º58'S	28º15'E				25°58′S 28°15′E
Woomera, Australia	Space Track	31º06'S	136º46'E				31°06′S 136°46′E
Cadiz, Spain	Space Track	36º28'N	353º48'E				36°28′N 6°12′W
Shiraz, Iran	Space Track	29º38'N	52º31'E				29°38′N 52°31′E
Curaçao, Netherlands West Indies	Space Track	12º05'N	291º10'E				12°05′N 68°50′W
Jupiter, Florida	Space Track	27º01'N	279º53'E				27°01′N 80°07′W
Haleakala, Hawaii	Space Track	20º43'N	203º45'E				20°43′N 156°15′W
Villa Dolores, Argentina	Space Track	31º57'S	294º54'E				31°57′S 65°06′W
Mitaka, Japan	Space Track						
Nanital, India	Space Track	29°23'N	79°27'E	2084	2004		29°23′N 79°27′E
Arequipa, Peru	Solar, Space Track						
Oak Ridge Observatory							

== SAO Today ==
The current director of the SAO is Lisa Kewley (2022 to present). There are currently about 170 research staff working at the SAO, including affiliated research staff. In addition, the SAO has about 120 postdoctoral researchers/fellows working in five competitive, associated fellowship programs: CfA, Clay, SMA, ITAMP, and Leon Van Speybroeck, or in support of a contract or grant. (Additional postdocs do research via Harvard fellowship programs or national/international fellowship awards); about 40% of the postdoctoral community are women and about 12% are from minority populations. SAO scientists can supervise Harvard Ph.D. students, and in addition they typically supervise about 30 graduate students from other institutions who are pursuing Ph.D. theses at the SAO. About thirty undergraduate students intern at the SAO each year. All together there are about 950 staff (including administrative and management department employees) working at the Center.

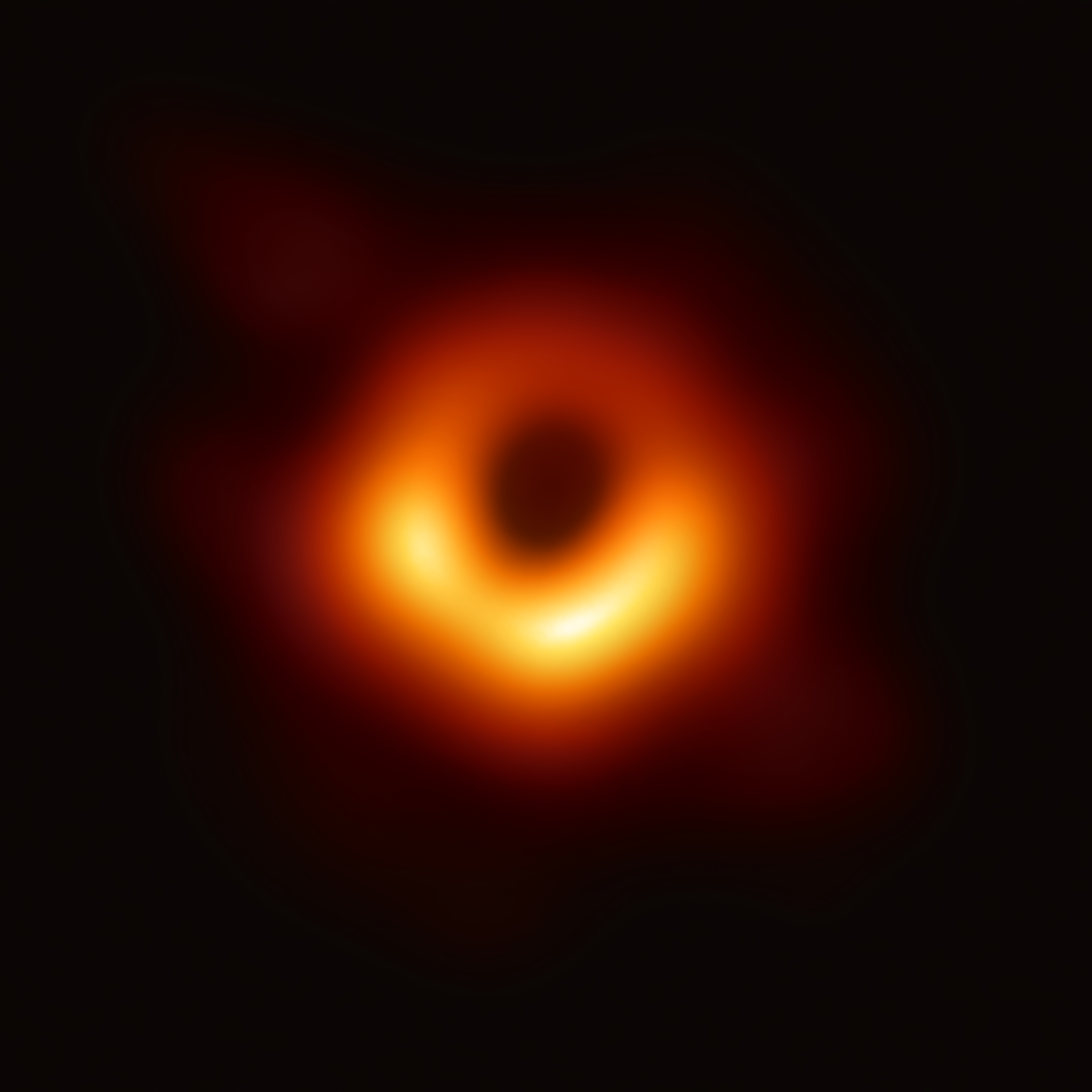
The first image of the photon ring of a black hole (M87*), captured by the Event Horizon Telescope. SAO plays a central role in the project.

== Directors ==
- Samuel Pierpont Langley 1890–1906
- Charles Greeley Abbot 1906–1942
- Loyal Blaine Aldrich 1942–1955
- Fred Lawrence Whipple 1955–1973
- George B. Field 1973–1982 (with the creation of the Harvard-Smithsonian Center for Astrophysics in 1973, the director of SAO and the Harvard College Observatory became a joint position)
- Irwin I. Shapiro 1982–2004
- Charles R. Alcock 2004–2022
- Lisa Kewley 2022–present

== Associates ==
- Margaret Sordahl

== See also ==
- List of astronomical societies
