= Amir Mohammad Bakhshi =

Iranian taekwondo practitioner

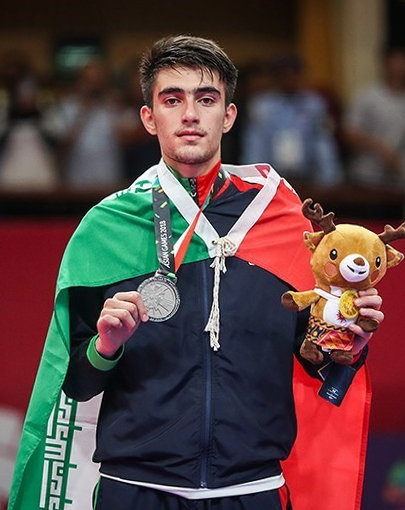
- Bakhshi at the 2018 Asian Games

Personal information
- Nationality: Iranian
- Born: 2 December 1999 (age 26) Mianeh, East Azerbaijan
- Education: Islamic Azad University

Sport
- Sport: Taekwondo
- Weight class: 74 kg
Medal record
Representing Iran
Asian Games
| Silver medal – second place | 2018 Jakarta | 68 kg |
Asian Championships
| Gold medal – first place | 2018 Ho Chi Minh City | 68 kg |
| Silver medal – second place | 2021 Beirut | 74 kg |
Universiade
| Gold medal – first place | 2019 Naples | 74 kg |
| Gold medal – first place | 2019 Naples | Team |
Islamic Solidarity Games
| Gold medal – first place | 2021 Konya | 74 kg |

Amir Mohammad Bakhshi Kalhori (Persian: امیر محمد بخشی کلهری; born 2 December 1999) is an Iranian taekwondo competitor. He won a silver medal at the 2018 Asian Games and a gold medal at the 2018 Asian Championships in the 68 kg event.
