= Lisa Kewley =

Australian astrophysicist

Lisa Jennifer Kewley
- Born: 1974 (age 51–52); Canberra, Australian Capital Territory
- Education: University of Adelaide; Australian National University
- Awards: The Bok Prize (1996); Annie Jump Cannon Award in Astronomy (2005); Newton Lacy Pierce Prize (2008); Australian Financial Review & Westpac; 100 Women of Influence (Innovation) (2014); Australian Laureate Fellowship (2015)
- Scientific career
- Fields: Astronomy
- Website: http://www.ifa.hawaii.edu/~kewley/ https://anu.academia.edu/LisaKewley

Lisa Jennifer Kewley FRSN FAA (born 1974) is an Australian astrophysicist and current Director of the Center for Astrophysics | Harvard & Smithsonian. Previously, Kewley was Director of the ARC Centre of Excellence for All Sky Astrophysics in 3-D (ASTRO 3-D) and ARC Laureate Fellow at the Australian National University College of Physical and Mathematical Sciences, where she was also a professor. Specialising in galaxy evolution, she won the Annie Jump Cannon Award in Astronomy in 2005 for her studies of oxygen in galaxies, and the Newton Lacy Pierce Prize in Astronomy in 2008. In 2014 she was elected a fellow of the Australian Academy of Science. In 2020 she received the James Craig Watson Medal. In 2021 she was elected as an international member of the National Academy of Sciences. In 2022 she became the first female director of the Center for Astrophysics | Harvard & Smithsonian.

== Life ==
Kewley was raised in South Australia. Her parents encouraged engagement with the sciences and she was influenced by a high school physics teacher, and participation at a school stargazing camp, to become interested in astronomy. After school, she enrolled in a Bachelor of Science at the University of Adelaide, graduating with a BSc (Hons) in astrophysics. She then moved to Canberra to pursue a doctorate in astrophysics at the Australian National University, which was awarded in 2002. In 2001, she spent some time in the United States as a visiting scholar at Johns Hopkins University. During this time she co-authored a paper in The Astrophysical Journal, called "Theoretical Modeling of Starburst Galaxies", which as of 2016 was her most-cited publication.

After completing her doctorate, Kewley moved to the Center for Astrophysics | Harvard & Smithsonian in Cambridge, Massachusetts, on a CfA fellowship, working on the formation and evolution of stars. Her mentors there included American astrophysicist Margaret Geller. Awarded a Hubble postdoctoral fellowship in 2004, she then continued her work at the Institute for Astronomy at the University of Hawaiʻi in 2005. Kewley was part of a team that used re-analysis of a Hubble Space Telescope image to identify a distant galaxy 9.3 billion light years distant. She then worked with the W. M. Keck Observatory on Mauna Kea, analysing data on the oxygen content of this and other galaxies of different ages, contributing to the understanding of their evolution. For this research, in 2005 she received the Annie Jump Cannon Award in Astronomy. There was further recognition of her work in 2008, when Kewley won the Newton Lacy Pierce Prize in Astronomy, awarded by the American Astronomical Society. The award was for her research "that has shown how the properties of a galaxy depend on how long ago it was formed". Her work studied the variation in properties of old and new galaxies, including oxygen richness, star formation rate, and the characteristics of the galaxy's nucleus.

In 2011, Kewley returned to Australia as a professor for the Research School of Astronomy and Astrophysics at the Australian National University.

In 2014, Kewley was elected Fellow of the Australian Academy of Science. She was chosen to deliver the 2018 Harley Wood lecture, an annual event of the Astronomical Society of Australia, on the topic of oxygen and stars. She was elected a Fellow of the Royal Society of New South Wales in 2020.

Kewley developed the proposal for, and is director of, the Australian Research Council Centre of Excellence in All Sky Astrophysics, based at Mount Stromlo.

She married her husband Reuben in Canberra in 2001, shortly before they moved to Massachusetts. They have two sons, one born in 2008 and the other in 2011, both born when she was living and working in Hawai'i.
