= Stefan Takov =

Serbian taekwondo practitioner

Personal information
- Born: 6 August 2002 (age 24) Novi Beograd, Serbia

Sport
- Country: Serbia
- Sport: Taekwondo
- Weight class: 74 kg
Medal record
Men's taekwondo
Representing Serbia
World Championships
Silver medal – second place	2023 Baku	74 kg
Bronze medal – third place	2022 Guadalajara	74 kg
European Championships
Gold medal – first place	2022 Manchester	74 kg
Gold medal – first place	2026 Munich	74 kg
European Games
Bronze medal – third place	2023 Kraków-Małopolska	74 kg
Mediterranean Games
Bronze medal – third place	2026 Taranto	80 kg

Stefan Takov (born 6 August 2002) is a Serbian taekwondo practitioner. He is a two-time medalist in the men's 74 kg at the World Taekwondo Championships. He also won the gold medal in his event at the 2022 European Taekwondo Championships held in Manchester, United Kingdom.

== Career ==
In 2022, he competed in the men's 80 kg event at the Mediterranean Games held in Oran, Algeria. He won his first match and he was then eliminated in his second match by eventual bronze medalist Apostolos Telikostoglou of Greece.

He competed in the men's 80 kg event at the 2024 Summer Olympics held in Paris, France.

== Achievements ==
Year	Event	Location	Place
2022	European Championships	Manchester, United Kingdom	1st
2022	World Championships	Guadalajara, Mexico	3rd
2023	World Championships	Baku, Azerbaijan	2nd
2023	European Games	Kraków and Małopolska, Poland	3rd
