= Xiang Qizhang =

Chinese taekwondo practitioner

Personal information
- Nationality: Chinese
- Born: 28 April 2004 (age 22)

Sport
- Sport: Taekwondo
- Weight class: 80 kg
Medal record
Men's taekwondo
Representing China
World Championships
| Silver medal – second place | 2025 Wuxi | 80 kg |

Xiang Qizhang (born 28 April 2004) is a Chinese taekwondo practitioner. He won a silver medal at the 2025 World Taekwondo Championships.

== Career ==
Xiang competed at the 2023 World Cup Taekwondo Team Championships and won a gold medal in the mixed gender team event. In August 2024, he competed in the mixed gender team performance of taekwondo at the 2024 Summer Olympics and won a gold medal. This was showcased as a demonstration event and is under consideration for inclusion as an official event at the 2028 Summer Olympics. In December 2024, he again competed at the World Cup Taekwondo Team Championships and won a silver medal in the mixed gender team event. In October 2025, he competed at the 2025 World Taekwondo Championships and won a silver medal in the 80 kg category.
