= Emilio Servadio =

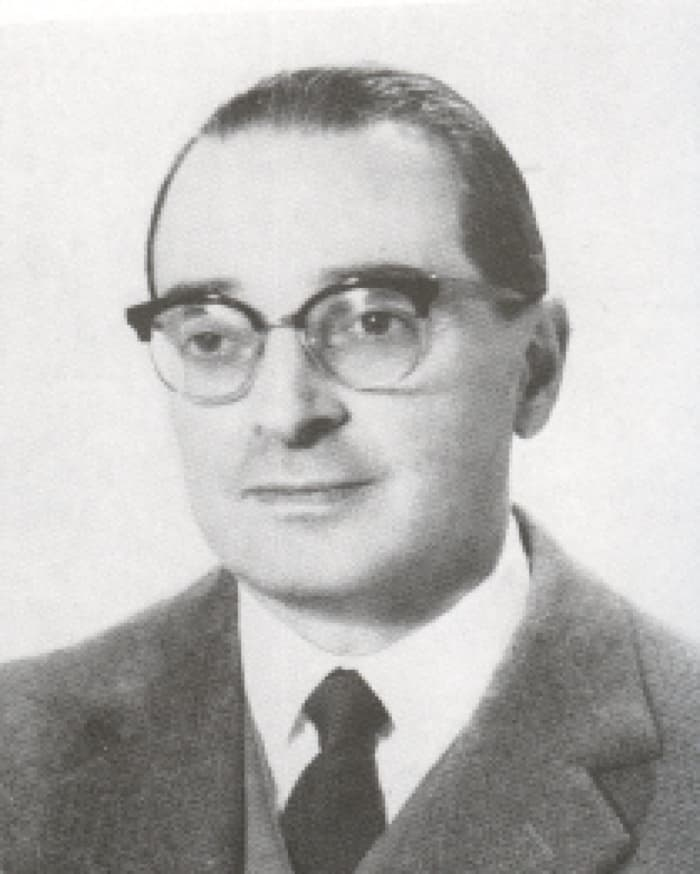
Emilio Servadio

Emilio Servadio (14 August 1904 – 18 January 1995) was an Italian psychoanalyst, parapsychologist, journalist, and esotericist. He was one of the founding members of the Italian Psychoanalytic Society (SPI), and a prominent figure in the international parapsychological community, noted for his orthodox Freudian approach to clinical psychoanalysis.

== Biography ==
Servadio was born in Sestri Levante (near Genoa) to a Jewish family. He graduated in law from the University of Genoa in 1926 with a thesis on the legal aspects of hypnosis.

Moving to Rome, he became deeply interested in psychoanalysis and western esotericism, studying texts by Franz Anton Mesmer, Edouard Schuré, Henry Morselli, Charles Robert Richet, Sigmund Freud, and adhering to the Traditionalist School of René Guénon.

During this period, he closely collaborated with the philosopher Julius Evola and the "Ur Group", an esoteric association, writing under the pseudonym Es.

=== Founder of the Italian Psychoanalytic Society ===
In 1932, alongside Edoardo Weiss and other pioneers, he co-founded the Italian Psychoanalytic Society (SPI) and its official journal, the Rivista di Psicoanalisi, a project that was fully supported by Freud himself.

Due to the enforcement of the Italian racial laws under the Fascist regime, Servadio emigrated to India in 1938, where he remained until 1946. During his time in India, he deepened his knowledge of Oriental philosophy, yoga and spirituality.

Upon returning to Italy after World War II, he resumed his psychoanalytic practice in Rome, becoming a training analyst and later the President of the SPI (1964–1969). He also gained notoriety for his cultural contributions, working as a cultural journalist, and for his therapeutic sessions with renowned filmmaker Federico Fellini, who was deeply influenced by Servadio's interest in the unconscious and the occult.

=== Parapsychology and Esotericism ===
Throughout his life, Servadio attempted to bridge the gap between psychoanalysis and parapsychology. In 1937, he co-founded the Italian Society for Parapsychology (SIP) with Ferdinando Cazzamalli, Giovanni Schepis and Luigi Sanguineti, with whom he served on the editorial board of the paranormal magazine Luce e Ombra.

Servadio considered the occult to be a manifestation of depth psychology, arguing that it should be studied with secular and scientific rigor, rather than being approached with sensationalism or mysticism, nor dismissed as mere superstition. He conducted extensive research into telepathy, mediumship, and altered states of consciousness, maintaining that paranormal phenomena could be understood through the lens of psychoanalytic concepts, such as transference and unconscious defenses.

== Selected publications ==
- Licheni (Lichens), Turin, Fratelli Ribet, 1929 (Poetry).
- La ricerca psichica (Psychic Research), Rome, Cremonese, 1930.
- The Oedipus Complex; Revision of the Concept, in "American Imago", Vol. 4, No. 4, 1947, pp. 1–31.
- Il sogno (The Dream), Milan, Garzanti, 1955.
- La psicologia dell'attualità (The Psychology of Current Events), Milan, Longanesi, 1961.
- L'educazione sessuale (Sexual Education), Neaples, Guida, 1970.
- Psiche e sessualità (Psyche and Sexuality), Rome, Astrolabio, 1972.
- Sesso e Psiche (Sex and Psyche), Milan, Armenia, 1972.
- Passi sulla via iniziatica (Steps on the Initiatic Path), Rome, Edizioni Mediterranee, 1977.
- Poesie del sogno e dell'estasi (Poems of Dream and Ecstasy), Florence, Nardini, 1988 (Poetry).
