= Crimilda Pontes =

American graphic designer

- Born: March 13, 1926; Somerset, Massachusetts, U.S.
- Died: January 25, 2000 (aged 73)
- Other name: Crimelda Pontes
- Occupations: Graphic designer, calligrapher

Crimilda Pontes (March 13, 1926 – January 25, 2000) was an American graphic designer and calligrapher. She designed many book covers and dust jackets, and was responsible for the Smithsonian Institution's "sunburst" logo.

== Early life ==
Pontes was born in Somerset, Massachusetts, the daughter of Albert Pontes and Irene Reis Cabral Pontes, of Bristol, Rhode Island. Her father was head custodian for Bristol schools. She was valedictorian of the Bristol Senior High School class of 1944. She recalled of her early education in 1968, "I would like it stressed that my interest in books and lettering was enkindled and encouraged in its development under the guidance of Miss Jessie Molaskey, librarian at Guiteras Junior High School."

Pontes studied with calligrapher John Howard Benson, and earned a Bachelor of Fine Arts degree at the Rhode Island School of Design in 1948. She completed her Master of Fine Arts degree in graphic design at Yale University in 1959.

The "sunburst" logo of the Smithsonian Institution, originally designed by Crimilda Pontes.

== Career ==
Pontes was an apprentice to John Howard Benson in Rhode Island after she graduated from college. She held the title Illustrator General at the Naval War College from 1951 to 1954, and taught art at Rosary Hill College from 1954 to 1957. In 1959, she inscribed the dedication in the book that American president Dwight D. Eisenhower gave to French president Charles de Gaulle at a summit in Paris.

Pontes designed book covers and dust jackets, working at Yale University Press from 1959 to 1964. She was a designer at the Smithsonian Institution for 23 years, beginning in 1965, and was responsible for creating the Smithsonian's "sunburst" logo. She retired in 1988. She also did lettering for postage stamps, banners, and posters.

The 1971 redesign of the American Historical Review was "chiefly owing" to the work of Pontes, "who brought to her task an unusual combination of sensitivity, taste, experience, and a remarkable grasp of scholarly needs and constraints; moreover, she has been great fun to work with", according to the journal's managing editor, Robert K. Webb. In 1984, she helped design the medal for members of the Order of James Smithson.

== Personal life ==
Pontes died in 2000, aged 73 years. Her gravesite is with her parents', in Bristol. Her papers are in the Crimilda Pontes Graphic Arts Archive at Western Michigan University, and the Crimilda Pontes Papers at the Smithsonian.
