= Firas Katoussi =

Tunisian taekwondo practitioner

Personal information
- Born: 6 September 1995 (age 30)
- Height: 203 cm (6 ft 8 in)

Sport
- Country: Tunisia
- Sport: Taekwondo
Medal record
Men's taekwondo
Representing Tunisia
Olympic Games
Gold medal – first place	2024 Paris	80 kg
World Championships
Bronze medal – third place	2022 Guadalajara	74 kg
Grand Prix
Gold medal – first place	2023 Taiyuan	80 kg
Bronze medal – third place	2022 Paris	80 kg
Bronze medal – third place	2022 Manchester	80 kg
African Games
Gold medal – first place	2019 Rabat	74 kg
Gold medal – first place	2023 Accra	80 kg
African Championships
Gold medal – first place	2021 Dakar	74 kg
Gold medal – first place	2022 Kigali	74 kg
Military World Games
Gold medal – first place	2019 Wuhan	74 kg
Mediterranean Games
Gold medal – first place	2026 Taranto	80 kg
Bronze medal – third place	2022 Oran	80 kg

Firas Katoussi (also spelled Katousi, Arabic: فراس القطوسي born 6 September 1995) is a Tunisian taekwondo practitioner. He won a gold medal at the 2024 Summer Olympics in the men's 80 kg. event.

== Career ==
He won one of the bronze medals in the men's lightweight event at the 2022 World Taekwondo Championships held in Guadalajara, Mexico. He represented Tunisia at the 2019 African Games held in Rabat, Morocco and he won the gold medal in the men's 74 kg event. He also won the gold medal in the men's 74 kg event at the 2019 Military World Games held in Wuhan, China.

In 2020, he competed in the men's 80 kg event at the African Olympic Qualification Tournament in Rabat, Morocco without qualifying for the 2020 Summer Olympics in Tokyo, Japan. He finished in 3rd place.

He won one of the bronze medals in the men's 80 kg event at the 2022 Mediterranean Games held in Oran, Algeria.

== Achievements ==
=== Summer Olympic Games ===
Event	Location	Weight class	Ranking
2024 Summer Olympics	Paris, France	80 kg	Gold

=== World Championships ===
Event	Location	Weight class	Ranking
2019 World Championships	Manchester, United Kingdom	74 kg	PAR
2022 World Championships	Guadalajara, Mexico	74 kg	Bronze
2023 World Championships	Baku, Azerbaidjan	74 kg	PAR

=== Grand Prix ===
Edition	Weight	GP 1	GP 2	GP 3	GP Final
2022	80 kg	QF (Italy) Rome	Bronze (France) Paris	Bronze (United Kingdom) Manchester	QF (Saudi Arabia) Riyadh
2023	80 kg	PAR (Italy) Rome	PAR (France) Paris	Gold (China) Taiyuan	PAR (United Kingdom) Manchester

=== African Games ===
Event	Location	Weight class	Ranking
2019 African Games	Rabat, Morocco	74 kg	Gold
2023 African Games	Accra, Ghana	80 kg	Gold

=== African Championships ===
Event	Location	Weight class	Ranking
2021 African Championships	Dakar, Senegal	74 kg	Gold
2022 African Championships	Kigali, Rwanda	74 kg	Gold
2023 African Championships	Abidjan, Ivory Coast	Did not compete	

== Decoration ==
- First Class of the National Order of Merit (Tunisia, 16 August 2024)
