= Daniel Quesada =

Spanish taekwondo athlete

Personal information
- Full name: Daniel Quesada Barrera
- Nationality: Spanish
- Born: 26 September 1995 (age 30) Spain

Sport
- Country: Spain
- Sport: Taekwondo
- Weight class: 74 kg
Medal record
World Championships
| Gold medal – first place | 2022 Guadalajara | 74 kg |
| Bronze medal – third place | 2019 Manchester | 74 kg |
European Games
| Bronze medal – third place | 2023 Kraków-Małopolska | 74 kg |
European Championships
| Gold medal – first place | 2024 Belgrade | 74 kg |
| Bronze medal – third place | 2021 Sofia | 74 kg |
Mediterranean Games
| Silver medal – second place | 2022 Oran | 80 kg |

Daniel Quesada Barrera (Note: In this Spanish name, the first or paternal surname is Quesada and the second or maternal family name is Barrera.) (born 26 September 1995 in Spain) is a Spanish taekwondo competitor. He won the gold medal in the men's lightweight event at the 2022 World Taekwondo Championships held in Guadalajara, Mexico. He won a bronze medal at the 2019 World Taekwondo Championships.

He won the silver medal in the men's 80 kg event at the 2022 Mediterranean Games held in Oran, Algeria.
