= Muhammed Emin Yıldız =

Turkish taekwondo practitioner

Personal information
- Born: 14 June 1995 (age 31) Turkey
- Height: 175 cm (5 ft 9 in)
- Weight: 74 kg (163 lb)

Sport
- Country: Turkey
- Sport: Taekwondo
Medal record
Representing Turkey
Men's taekwondo
European Championships
Silver medal – second place	2018 Kazan	74 kg
Bronze medal – third place	2022 Manchester	74 kg
Grand Prix
Bronze medal – third place	2023 Paris	80 kg
Islamic Solidarity Games
Bronze medal – third place	2021 Konya	74 kg

Muhammed Emin Yıldız (born 14 June 1995) is a Turkish taekwondo athlete.

== Career ==
In 2018, Muhammed Emin Yıldız won the silver medals in 74 kg at the 2018 European Taekwondo Championships held in Kazan, Russia.

In 2022, he won one of the bronze medals in 74 kg at the 2022 European Taekwondo Championships held in Manchester, England.
