= Jasurbek Jaysunov =

Uzbek taekwondo practitioner (born 2002)

Personal information
- Born: 19 April 2002 (age 24) Tashkent, Uzbekistan

Sport
- Sport: Taekwondo
- Weight class: -80 kg, -74 kg
- Club: Grandmaster Club
- Coached by: Vladimir Khan
Medal record
Men's taekwondo
Representing Uzbekistan
Asian Games
Gold medal – first place	2026 Aichi-Nagoya	80 kg
Bronze medal – third place	2022 Hangzhou	Mixed team
Asian Championships
Gold medal – first place	2022 Chuncheon	74 kg
Gold medal – first place	2024 Da Nang	80 kg
Silver medal – second place	2026 Ulaanbaatar	80 kg
Islamic Solidarity Games
Bronze medal – third place	2021 Konya	74 kg

Jasurbek Jaysunov (born 19 April 2002) is an Uzbek taekwondo practitioner. He was a bronze medalist at the 2022 Asian Games and qualified for the 2024 Olympic Games.

== Career ==
He was a bronze medalist at the delayed 2021 Islamic Solidarity Games in the 74 kg division in Konya, Turkey in August 2022. At the 2022 Asian Taekwondo Championships he won gold in the 74 kg category in Chuncheon, South Korea.

He was a bronze medalist at the 2022 Asian Games in the mixed team event. He won a silver medal in the 2023 World Cup Taekwondo Team Championships.

He was a gold medalist in the -80 kg category at the 2024 Asian Taekwondo Championships in Vietnam. He entered the 2024 Asian Taekwondo Olympic Qualification Tournament and earned a place at the upcoming Olympic Games. He was selected for the 2024 Summer Olympics in Paris. He competed in the men's 80 kg event at the Olympics.
