= Nedžad Husić =

Bosnian taekwondo practitioner

Personal information
- Nationality: Bosnian
- Born: 15 September 2001 (age 24) Sarajevo, Bosnia and Herzegovina
- Height: 1.87 m (6 ft 2 in)
- Weight: 74 kg (163 lb)

Sport
- Country: Bosnia and Herzegovina
- Sport: Taekwondo
- Club: Taekwondo Novi Grad Sarajevo
- Coached by: Haris Husić (father)

Achievements and titles
- Olympic finals: 5th - 2020 Summer Olympics
Medal record
Men's taekwondo
Representing Bosnia and Herzegovina
European Games
Silver medal – second place	2023 Kraków-Małopolska	74 kg
European Championships
Silver medal – second place	2021 Sofia	74 kg
Silver medal – second place	2022 Manchester	74 kg
Bronze medal – third place	2024 Belgrade	80 kg
European U21 Championships
Gold medal – first place	2021 Tallinn	74 kg
Bronze medal – third place	2019 Helsingborg	68 kg
World Junior Championships
Bronze medal – third place	2018 Hammamet	63 kg
European Junior Championships
Bronze medal – third place	2017 Larnaca	63 kg

Nedžad Husić (born 15 September 2001) is a Bosnian taekwondo athlete.

== Career ==
Husić won a silver medal at the 2021 European Taekwondo Championships, in the men's 74 kg.

He qualified for the 2020 Summer Olympics through the 2021 European Taekwondo Olympic Qualification Tournament.

Husić competed at the 2020 Summer Olympics in the men's 68 kg and after four fights achieved 5th place, the best ever Olympic position for Bosnia and Herzegovina including all sports.
