= List of World Championships medalists in taekwondo (men) =

This is a List of World Championships medalists in men's taekwondo.

== Finweight ==
- −48 kg: 1975–1983
- −50 kg: 1985–1997
- −54 kg: 1999–

Championships	Gold	Silver	Bronze
1975 Seoul	Hwang Soo-yong (KOR)	Jaime de Pablos (MEX)	Hideshi Yamane (JPN)
1975 Seoul	Hwang Soo-yong (KOR)	Jaime de Pablos (MEX)	Liu Ching-wen (ROC)
1977 Chicago	Song Ki-yul (KOR)	Jaime de Pablos (MEX)	Turgay Ertuğrul (FRG)
1977 Chicago	Song Ki-yul (KOR)	Jaime de Pablos (MEX)	Sheu Jiom-shi (ROC)
1979 Stuttgart	Lee Seung-kyung (KOR)	Jaime de Pablos (MEX)	Emilio Azofra (ESP)
1979 Stuttgart	Lee Seung-kyung (KOR)	Jaime de Pablos (MEX)	Dae Sung Lee (USA)
1982 Guayaquil	José Cedeño (ECU)	César Rodríguez (MEX)	Emilio Azofra (ESP)
1982 Guayaquil	José Cedeño (ECU)	César Rodríguez (MEX)	Dae Sung Lee (USA)
1983 Copenhagen	Wang Kwang-yeon (KOR)	César Rodríguez (MEX)	Emilio Azofra (ESP)
1983 Copenhagen	Wang Kwang-yeon (KOR)	César Rodríguez (MEX)	Choi Chan-ok (FRG)
1985 Seoul	Lee Sun-jang (KOR)	Dae Sung Lee (USA)	Koidio Konan (CIV)
1985 Seoul	Lee Sun-jang (KOR)	Dae Sung Lee (USA)	Abdullah Al-Najrani (KSA)
1987 Barcelona	Lim Sung-wook (KOR)	Enrique Torroella (MEX)	Bidhan Lama (NEP)
1987 Barcelona	Lim Sung-wook (KOR)	Enrique Torroella (MEX)	Dae Sung Lee (USA)
1989 Seoul	Kwon Tae-ho (KOR)	Chang Jung-san (TPE)	Harun Ateş (TUR)
1989 Seoul	Kwon Tae-ho (KOR)	Chang Jung-san (TPE)	Juan Moreno (USA)
1991 Athens	Gergely Salim (DEN)	Chang Jung-san (TPE)	Sirous Rezaei (IRI)
1991 Athens	Gergely Salim (DEN)	Chang Jung-san (TPE)	Kang Cheol-woo (KOR)
1993 New York City	Jin Seung-tae (KOR)	Gergely Salim (DEN)	Eamon Nolan (CAN)
1993 New York City	Jin Seung-tae (KOR)	Gergely Salim (DEN)	Carlos Ayala (MEX)
1995 Manila	Jin Seung-tae (KOR)	Roberto Cruz (PHI)	Mohammad Al-Hamed (JOR)
1995 Manila	Jin Seung-tae (KOR)	Roberto Cruz (PHI)	Carlos Chamorro (SWE)
1997 Hong Kong	Juan Antonio Ramos (ESP)	Roberto Cruz (PHI)	Lee Hou-kun (TPE)
1997 Hong Kong	Juan Antonio Ramos (ESP)	Roberto Cruz (PHI)	Nazım Yılmaz (TUR)
1999 Edmonton	Min Byeong-seok (KOR)	Roberto Cruz (PHI)	Gabriel Mercedes (DOM)
1999 Edmonton	Min Byeong-seok (KOR)	Roberto Cruz (PHI)	Chen Wei-chun (TPE)
2001 Jeju	Choi Yeon-ho (KOR)	Chu Mu-yen (TPE)	Juan Antonio Ramos (ESP)
2001 Jeju	Choi Yeon-ho (KOR)	Chu Mu-yen (TPE)	Roberto Cruz (PHI)
2003 Garmisch-P.	Choi Yeon-ho (KOR)	Paul Green (GBR)	Zahid Mammadov (AZE)
2003 Garmisch-P.	Choi Yeon-ho (KOR)	Paul Green (GBR)	Roberto Cruz (PHI)
2005 Madrid	Kim Jin-hee (KOR)	Feizollah Nafjam (IRI)	Gerardo Rodríguez (MEX)
2005 Madrid	Kim Jin-hee (KOR)	Feizollah Nafjam (IRI)	Seyfula Magomedov (RUS)
2007 Beijing	Choi Yeon-ho (KOR)	Chutchawal Khawlaor (THA)	Aslan Batykulov (KAZ)
2007 Beijing	Choi Yeon-ho (KOR)	Chutchawal Khawlaor (THA)	Rodolfo Osornio (MEX)
2009 Copenhagen	Choi Yeon-ho (KOR)	Mahmood Haidari (AFG)	Meisam Bagheri (IRI)
2009 Copenhagen	Choi Yeon-ho (KOR)	Mahmood Haidari (AFG)	Chutchawal Khawlaor (THA)
2011 Gyeongju	Chutchawal Khawlaor (THA)	Park Ji-woong (KOR)	Meisam Bagheri (IRI)
2011 Gyeongju	Chutchawal Khawlaor (THA)	Park Ji-woong (KOR)	Seyfula Magomedov (RUS)
2013 Puebla	Kim Tae-hun (KOR)	Hsu Chia-lin (TPE)	Hussein Sherif (EGY)
2013 Puebla	Kim Tae-hun (KOR)	Hsu Chia-lin (TPE)	Jerranat Nakaviroj (THA)
2015 Chelyabinsk	Kim Tae-hun (KOR)	Stanislav Denisov (RUS)	Venilton Teixeira (BRA)
2015 Chelyabinsk	Kim Tae-hun (KOR)	Stanislav Denisov (RUS)	Ramnarong Sawekwiharee (THA)
2017 Muju	Kim Tae-hun (KOR)	Armin Hadipour (IRI)	Vito Dell'Aquila (ITA)
2017 Muju	Kim Tae-hun (KOR)	Armin Hadipour (IRI)	Ramnarong Sawekwiharee (THA)
2019 Manchester	Bae Jun-seo (KOR)	Georgy Popov (RUS)	Paulo Melo (BRA)
2019 Manchester	Bae Jun-seo (KOR)	Georgy Popov (RUS)	Armin Hadipour (IRI)
2022 Guadalajara	Omar Salim (HUN)	César Rodríguez (MEX)	Bae Jun-seo (KOR)
2022 Guadalajara	Omar Salim (HUN)	César Rodríguez (MEX)	Chen Po-yen (TPE)
2023 Baku	Park Tae-joon (KOR)	Hugo Arillo (ESP)	Görkem Polat (TUR)
2023 Baku	Park Tae-joon (KOR)	Hugo Arillo (ESP)	Omonjon Otajonov (UZB)
2025 Wuxi	Seo Eun-su (KOR)	Furkan Ubeyde Çamoğlu (TUR)	Aristeidis Psarros (GRE)
2025 Wuxi	Seo Eun-su (KOR)	Furkan Ubeyde Çamoğlu (TUR)	Jakhongir Khudayberdiev (UZB)

== Flyweight ==
- −53 kg: 1975–1977
- −52 kg: 1979–1983
- −54 kg: 1985–1997
- −58 kg: 1999–

Championships	Gold	Silver	Bronze
1975 Seoul	Han You-keun (KOR)	Liu Chin-chien (ROC)	Moritz Von Nacher (MEX)
1975 Seoul	Han You-keun (KOR)	Liu Chin-chien (ROC)	Jaime Martin (PHI)
1977 Chicago	Ha Suk-kwang (KOR)	Jorge Ramírez (ECU)	Francisco García (ESP)
1977 Chicago	Ha Suk-kwang (KOR)	Jorge Ramírez (ECU)	Moritz Von Nacher (MEX)
1979 Stuttgart	Yang Ki-mo (KOR)	Jesús Benito (ESP)	Bachir Ouazzani (MAR)
1979 Stuttgart	Yang Ki-mo (KOR)	Jesús Benito (ESP)	Ramiro Guzmán (MEX)
1982 Guayaquil	Jeon Woong-hwan (KOR)	Su Chen-chia (TPE)	Turgay Ertuğrul (FRG)
1982 Guayaquil	Jeon Woong-hwan (KOR)	Su Chen-chia (TPE)	Fernando Celada (MEX)
1983 Copenhagen	Ko Jeong-ho (KOR)	Turgut Uçan (TUR)	Javier Benito (ESP)
1983 Copenhagen	Ko Jeong-ho (KOR)	Turgut Uçan (TUR)	Giuseppe Flotti (ITA)
1985 Seoul	Kim Young-sik (KOR)	Younousse Bathily (CIV)	Geremia Di Costanzo (ITA)
1985 Seoul	Kim Young-sik (KOR)	Younousse Bathily (CIV)	Sang Hon Cha (USA)
1987 Barcelona	Kang Chang-mo (KOR)	Budi Setiawan (INA)	Younousse Bathily (CIV)
1987 Barcelona	Kang Chang-mo (KOR)	Budi Setiawan (INA)	Geremia Di Costanzo (ITA)
1989 Seoul	Kim Cheol-ho (KOR)	Turgut Uçan (TUR)	Salb Abdelhamid (EGY)
1989 Seoul	Kim Cheol-ho (KOR)	Turgut Uçan (TUR)	Fariborz Danesh (IRI)
1991 Athens	Kim Cheol-ho (KOR)	József Salim (DEN)	Gabriel Esparza (ESP)
1991 Athens	Kim Cheol-ho (KOR)	József Salim (DEN)	Django Tapilatu (NED)
1993 New York City	Javier Argudo (ESP)	Alisson Yamagudi (BRA)	Rubén Palafox (MEX)
1993 New York City	Javier Argudo (ESP)	Alisson Yamagudi (BRA)	Hyon Lee (USA)
1995 Manila	Cihat Kutluca (TUR)	Mehrdad Rokni (IRI)	Gergely Salim (HUN)
1995 Manila	Cihat Kutluca (TUR)	Mehrdad Rokni (IRI)	Rubén Palafox (MEX)
1997 Hong Kong	Jin Seung-tae (KOR)	Tsai Yi-ya (TPE)	Geraldhy Altamirano (ECU)
1997 Hong Kong	Jin Seung-tae (KOR)	Tsai Yi-ya (TPE)	Ludovic Vo (FRA)
1999 Edmonton	Yoon Jong-il (KOR)	Abror Haider (DEN)	Younes Sekkat (MAR)
1999 Edmonton	Yoon Jong-il (KOR)	Abror Haider (DEN)	Hồ Nhất Thống (VIE)
2001 Jeju	Behzad Khodadad (IRI)	Eduard Khegai (UZB)	Kim Dae-ryung (KOR)
2001 Jeju	Behzad Khodadad (IRI)	Eduard Khegai (UZB)	Seyfula Magomedov (RUS)
2003 Garmisch-P.	Chu Mu-yen (TPE)	Behzad Khodadad (IRI)	Ko Seok-hwa (KOR)
2003 Garmisch-P.	Chu Mu-yen (TPE)	Behzad Khodadad (IRI)	Tim Thackrey (USA)
2005 Madrid	Ko Seok-hwa (KOR)	Behzad Khodadad (IRI)	Dech Sutthikunkarn (THA)
2005 Madrid	Ko Seok-hwa (KOR)	Behzad Khodadad (IRI)	Đinh Thanh Long (VIE)
2007 Beijing	Juan Antonio Ramos (ESP)	Guillermo Pérez (MEX)	Tamer Bayoumi (EGY)
2007 Beijing	Juan Antonio Ramos (ESP)	Guillermo Pérez (MEX)	Lee Sun-jae (KOR)
2009 Copenhagen	Joel González (ESP)	Damián Villa (MEX)	Sayed Hasan Rezai (AFG)
2009 Copenhagen	Joel González (ESP)	Damián Villa (MEX)	Mauro Crismanich (ARG)
2011 Gyeongju	Joel González (ESP)	Rui Bragança (POR)	Gabriel Mercedes (DOM)
2011 Gyeongju	Joel González (ESP)	Rui Bragança (POR)	Wei Chen-yang (TPE)
2013 Puebla	Cha Tae-moon (KOR)	Hadi Mostaan (IRI)	Guilherme Dias (BRA)
2013 Puebla	Cha Tae-moon (KOR)	Hadi Mostaan (IRI)	Damián Villa (MEX)
2015 Chelyabinsk	Farzan Ashourzadeh (IRI)	Si Mohamed Ketbi (WTF)	Zhao Shuai (CHN)
2015 Chelyabinsk	Farzan Ashourzadeh (IRI)	Si Mohamed Ketbi (WTF)	Ruslan Poiseev (RUS)
2017 Muju	Jeong Yun-jo (KOR)	Mikhail Artamonov (RUS)	Jesús Tortosa (ESP)
2017 Muju	Jeong Yun-jo (KOR)	Mikhail Artamonov (RUS)	Carlos Navarro (MEX)
2019 Manchester	Jang Jun (KOR)	Brandon Plaza (MEX)	Lucas Guzmán (ARG)
2019 Manchester	Jang Jun (KOR)	Brandon Plaza (MEX)	Rui Bragança (POR)
2022 Guadalajara	Vito Dell'Aquila (ITA)	Jang Jun (KOR)	Brandon Plaza (MEX)
2022 Guadalajara	Vito Dell'Aquila (ITA)	Jang Jun (KOR)	Mohamed Khalil Jendoubi (TUN)
2023 Baku	Bae Jun-seo (KOR)	Georgii Gurtsiev (AIN)	Adrián Vicente (ESP)
2023 Baku	Bae Jun-seo (KOR)	Georgii Gurtsiev (AIN)	Mahmoud Al-Taryreh (JOR)
2025 Wuxi	Abolfazl Zandi (IRI)	Georgii Gurtsiev (AIN)	Gashim Magomedov (AZE)
2025 Wuxi	Abolfazl Zandi (IRI)	Georgii Gurtsiev (AIN)	Huang Kefen (CHN)

== Bantamweight ==
- −58 kg: 1975–1977
- −56 kg: 1979–1983
- −58 kg: 1985–1997
- −62 kg: 1999–2007
- −63 kg: 2009–

Championships	Gold	Silver	Bronze
1975 Seoul	Son Tae-hwan (KOR)	Ramiro Guzmán (MEX)	Hubert Leuchter (FRG)
1975 Seoul	Son Tae-hwan (KOR)	Ramiro Guzmán (MEX)	Dennis Robinson (USA)
1977 Chicago	Kim Yong-ki (KOR)	Hour Waei-shing (ROC)	Helmut Stoppe (FRG)
1977 Chicago	Kim Yong-ki (KOR)	Hour Waei-shing (ROC)	Reynaldo Salazar (MEX)
1979 Stuttgart	Kim Yong-ki (KOR)	Pablo Arizmendi (MEX)	Dragan Veljović (FRG)
1979 Stuttgart	Kim Yong-ki (KOR)	Pablo Arizmendi (MEX)	Chung Sik Choi (USA)
1982 Guayaquil	Kim Yong-ki (KOR)	Jesús Benito (ESP)	Jimmy de Fretes (NED)
1982 Guayaquil	Kim Yong-ki (KOR)	Jesús Benito (ESP)	Chung Sik Choi (USA)
1983 Copenhagen	Han Hong-sik (KOR)	Luis Torner (ESP)	Nader Khodamoradi (IRI)
1983 Copenhagen	Han Hong-sik (KOR)	Luis Torner (ESP)	Geremia Di Costanzo (ITA)
1985 Seoul	Yoo Myung-sik (KOR)	Gustavo Sanciprián (MEX)	Feisal Danesh (IRI)
1985 Seoul	Yoo Myung-sik (KOR)	Gustavo Sanciprián (MEX)	Cengiz Yağız (TUR)
1987 Barcelona	Yoo Myung-sik (KOR)	Şakir Bezci (TUR)	Alf Dell'orso (AUS)
1987 Barcelona	Yoo Myung-sik (KOR)	Şakir Bezci (TUR)	Nuno Dâmaso (SUI)
1989 Seoul	Ham Jun (KOR)	Domenico D'Alise (ITA)	Christian Herberth (FRG)
1989 Seoul	Ham Jun (KOR)	Domenico D'Alise (ITA)	Abdullah Al-Najrani (KSA)
1991 Athens	Ángel Alonso (ESP)	Sayed Najem (CAN)	Seon Sang-joon (KOR)
1991 Athens	Ángel Alonso (ESP)	Sayed Najem (CAN)	Ekrem Boyalı (TUR)
1993 New York City	Kim In-young (KOR)	Sayed Najem (CAN)	Wong Ching Beng (MAS)
1993 New York City	Kim In-young (KOR)	Sayed Najem (CAN)	Walter Dean Vargas (PHI)
1995 Manila	Chang Dae-soon (KOR)	Gabriel Esparza (ESP)	Huang Chih-hsiung (TPE)
1995 Manila	Chang Dae-soon (KOR)	Gabriel Esparza (ESP)	Trần Quang Hạ (VIE)
1997 Hong Kong	Huang Chih-hsiung (TPE)	Mehdi Bibak (IRI)	Liu Chuang (CHN)
1997 Hong Kong	Huang Chih-hsiung (TPE)	Mehdi Bibak (IRI)	Óscar Salazar (MEX)
1999 Edmonton	Ko Dae-kyu (KOR)	Ahmet Evcimen (TUR)	Ivan Ron (ESP)
1999 Edmonton	Ko Dae-kyu (KOR)	Ahmet Evcimen (TUR)	Mark López (USA)
2001 Jeju	Kang Nam-won (KOR)	Peter López (USA)	Miguel Toledo (ESP)
2001 Jeju	Kang Nam-won (KOR)	Peter López (USA)	Kiyoteru Higuchi (JPN)
2003 Garmisch-P.	Huang Chih-hsiung (TPE)	Omar Badia (ESP)	Omid Gholamzadeh (IRI)
2003 Garmisch-P.	Huang Chih-hsiung (TPE)	Omar Badia (ESP)	Peter López (USA)
2005 Madrid	Kim Jae-sik (KOR)	Márcio Wenceslau (BRA)	Ilan Goldschmidt (ISR)
2005 Madrid	Kim Jae-sik (KOR)	Márcio Wenceslau (BRA)	Kıvanç Dinçsalman (TUR)
2007 Beijing	Filip Grgić (CRO)	Nacha Punthong (THA)	Marcel Wenceslau (BRA)
2007 Beijing	Filip Grgić (CRO)	Nacha Punthong (THA)	Rafik Zohri (NED)
2009 Copenhagen	Yeom Hyo-seob (KOR)	Reza Naderian (IRI)	Javier Marrón (ESP)
2009 Copenhagen	Yeom Hyo-seob (KOR)	Reza Naderian (IRI)	Cem Uluğnuyan (TUR)
2011 Gyeongju	Lee Dae-hoon (KOR)	Michael Harvey (GBR)	Nacha Punthong (THA)
2011 Gyeongju	Lee Dae-hoon (KOR)	Michael Harvey (GBR)	Lê Huỳnh Châu (VIE)
2013 Puebla	Lee Dae-hoon (KOR)	Abel Mendoza (MEX)	Stevens Barclais (FRA)
2013 Puebla	Lee Dae-hoon (KOR)	Abel Mendoza (MEX)	Wei Chen-yang (TPE)
2015 Chelyabinsk	Jaouad Achab (WTF)	Joel González (ESP)	Abolfazl Yaghoubi (IRI)
2015 Chelyabinsk	Jaouad Achab (WTF)	Joel González (ESP)	Saúl Gutiérrez (MEX)
2017 Muju	Zhao Shuai (CHN)	Mirhashem Hosseini (IRI)	Mahammad Mammadov (AZE)
2017 Muju	Zhao Shuai (CHN)	Mirhashem Hosseini (IRI)	Bradly Sinden (GBR)
2019 Manchester	Zhao Shuai (CHN)	Soroush Ahmadi (IRI)	Jaouad Achab (BEL)
2019 Manchester	Zhao Shuai (CHN)	Soroush Ahmadi (IRI)	Iordanis Konstantinidis (GER)
2022 Guadalajara	Liang Yushuai (CHN)	Niyaz Pulatov (UZB)	Joan Jorquera (ESP)
2022 Guadalajara	Liang Yushuai (CHN)	Niyaz Pulatov (UZB)	Zaid Al-Halawani (JOR)
2023 Baku	Hakan Reçber (TUR)	Banlung Tubtimdang (THA)	Joan Jorquera (ESP)
2023 Baku	Hakan Reçber (TUR)	Banlung Tubtimdang (THA)	Carlos Navarro (MEX)
2025 Wuxi	Mohamed Khalil Jendoubi (TUN)	Mehdi Haji Mousaei (IRI)	Mahmoud Al-Taryreh (JOR)
2025 Wuxi	Mohamed Khalil Jendoubi (TUN)	Mehdi Haji Mousaei (IRI)	Jang Jun (KOR)

== Featherweight ==
- −63 kg: 1975–1977
- −60 kg: 1979–1983
- −64 kg: 1985–1997
- −67 kg: 1999–2007
- −68 kg: 2009–

Championships	Gold	Silver	Bronze
1975 Seoul	Lee Gyeo-sung (KOR)	Wolfgang Dahmen (FRG)	Martin Hall (AUS)
1975 Seoul	Lee Gyeo-sung (KOR)	Wolfgang Dahmen (FRG)	Hossein Rabizadeh (IRI)
1977 Chicago	Park Chung-ho (KOR)	Greg Fears (USA)	Frédéric Kouassi (CIV)
1977 Chicago	Park Chung-ho (KOR)	Greg Fears (USA)	Peter Salm (NED)
1979 Stuttgart	Yim Dai-taik (KOR)	Reynaldo Salazar (MEX)	Martin Hall (AUS)
1979 Stuttgart	Yim Dai-taik (KOR)	Reynaldo Salazar (MEX)	Bernd Bartsch (FRG)
1982 Guayaquil	Chang Myung-sam (KOR)	Ignacio Blanco (MEX)	Raffaele Marchione (ITA)
1982 Guayaquil	Chang Myung-sam (KOR)	Ignacio Blanco (MEX)	Kao Ming-lu (TPE)
1983 Copenhagen	Lee Jae-bong (KOR)	Thomas Fabula (FRG)	Gustavo Sanciprián (MEX)
1983 Copenhagen	Lee Jae-bong (KOR)	Thomas Fabula (FRG)	Ahmet Ercan (TUR)
1985 Seoul	Han Jae-koo (KOR)	Ahmet Ercan (TUR)	Iván Tejeda (DOM)
1985 Seoul	Han Jae-koo (KOR)	Ahmet Ercan (TUR)	Lucio Cuozzo (ITA)
1987 Barcelona	Lee Chian-hsiang (TPE)	Luis Torner (ESP)	Mustafa Elmalı (TUR)
1987 Barcelona	Lee Chian-hsiang (TPE)	Luis Torner (ESP)	Chris Spence (USA)
1989 Seoul	Jang Hyuk (KOR)	Hubert Sinègre (FRA)	Musa Çiçek (FRG)
1989 Seoul	Jang Hyuk (KOR)	Hubert Sinègre (FRA)	Dhanaraj Rassiah (MAS)
1991 Athens	Jang Hyuk (KOR)	Stephen Tapilatu (NED)	Jorge Gonçalves (BRA)
1991 Athens	Jang Hyuk (KOR)	Stephen Tapilatu (NED)	Tamer Abdelmoneim Hussein (EGY)
1993 New York City	Kim Byong-cheol (KOR)	Milton Iwama (BRA)	Francisco Zas (ESP)
1993 New York City	Kim Byong-cheol (KOR)	Milton Iwama (BRA)	David Kang (USA)
1995 Manila	Kim Byung-uk (KOR)	Clayton Barber (USA)	Bijan Moghanloo (IRI)
1995 Manila	Kim Byung-uk (KOR)	Clayton Barber (USA)	Claudio Nolano (ITA)
1997 Hong Kong	Kim In-dong (KOR)	Ekrem Boyalı (TUR)	Rafael Zúñiga (MEX)
1997 Hong Kong	Kim In-dong (KOR)	Ekrem Boyalı (TUR)	Hsu Chi-hung (TPE)
1999 Edmonton	No Hyun-goo (KOR)	Jesper Roesen (DEN)	Francisco Zas (ESP)
1999 Edmonton	No Hyun-goo (KOR)	Jesper Roesen (DEN)	Hsu Chi-hung (TPE)
2001 Jeju	Niyamaddin Pashayev (AZE)	Carlo Molfetta (ITA)	Luis Benítez (DOM)
2001 Jeju	Niyamaddin Pashayev (AZE)	Carlo Molfetta (ITA)	Abdullah Sertçelik (TUR)
2003 Garmisch-P.	Kang Nam-won (KOR)	Mark López (USA)	Niyamaddin Pashayev (AZE)
2003 Garmisch-P.	Kang Nam-won (KOR)	Mark López (USA)	Erdal Aylanc (GER)
2005 Madrid	Mark López (USA)	Song Myeong-seob (KOR)	Aritz Itsisoa (ESP)
2005 Madrid	Mark López (USA)	Song Myeong-seob (KOR)	Dennis Bekkers (NED)
2007 Beijing	Gessler Viera (CUB)	Omid Gholamzadeh (IRI)	Song Myeong-seob (KOR)
2007 Beijing	Gessler Viera (CUB)	Omid Gholamzadeh (IRI)	Dennis Bekkers (NED)
2009 Copenhagen	Mohammad Bagheri Motamed (IRI)	Idulio Islas (MEX)	Balla Dièye (SEN)
2009 Copenhagen	Mohammad Bagheri Motamed (IRI)	Idulio Islas (MEX)	Servet Tazegül (TUR)
2011 Gyeongju	Servet Tazegül (TUR)	Mohammad Bagheri Motamed (IRI)	Rohullah Nikpai (AFG)
2011 Gyeongju	Servet Tazegül (TUR)	Mohammad Bagheri Motamed (IRI)	Martin Stamper (GBR)
2013 Puebla	Behnam Asbaghi (IRI)	Kim Hun (KOR)	José Antonio Rosillo (ESP)
2013 Puebla	Behnam Asbaghi (IRI)	Kim Hun (KOR)	Balla Dièye (SEN)
2015 Chelyabinsk	Servet Tazegül (TUR)	Aleksey Denisenko (RUS)	José Antonio Rosillo (ESP)
2015 Chelyabinsk	Servet Tazegül (TUR)	Aleksey Denisenko (RUS)	Shin Dong-yun (KOR)
2017 Muju	Lee Dae-hoon (KOR)	Huang Yu-jen (TPE)	Vladimir Dalakliev (BUL)
2017 Muju	Lee Dae-hoon (KOR)	Huang Yu-jen (TPE)	Ahmad Abughaush (JOR)
2019 Manchester	Bradly Sinden (GBR)	Javier Pérez (ESP)	Lee Dae-hoon (KOR)
2019 Manchester	Bradly Sinden (GBR)	Javier Pérez (ESP)	Aleksey Denisenko (RUS)
2022 Guadalajara	Kwon Do-yun (KOR)	Bradly Sinden (GBR)	Javad Aghayev (AZE)
2022 Guadalajara	Kwon Do-yun (KOR)	Bradly Sinden (GBR)	Reza Kalhor (IRI)
2023 Baku	Bradly Sinden (GBR)	Jin Ho-jun (KOR)	Matin Rezaei (IRI)
2023 Baku	Bradly Sinden (GBR)	Jin Ho-jun (KOR)	Ulugbek Rashitov (UZB)
2025 Wuxi	Banlung Tubtimdang (THA)	Seong Yu-hyeon (KOR)	Matija Črep (CRO)
2025 Wuxi	Banlung Tubtimdang (THA)	Seong Yu-hyeon (KOR)	Maikol Rodriguez (USA)

== Lightweight ==
- −64 kg: 1973
- −68 kg: 1975–1977
- −64 kg: 1979–1983
- −70 kg: 1985–1997
- −72 kg: 1999–2007
- −74 kg: 2009–

Championships	Gold	Silver	Bronze
1973 Seoul	Lee Ki-hyung (KOR)	Armando Chavero (FRG)	Georg Karrenberg (FRG)
1973 Seoul	Lee Ki-hyung (KOR)	Armando Chavero (FRG)	Joe Hayes (USA)
1975 Seoul	Yoo Yong-hap (KOR)	Michael Adey (AUS)	Emmanuel Paman (CIV)
1975 Seoul	Yoo Yong-hap (KOR)	Michael Adey (AUS)	Wang Tieh-cheng (ROC)
1977 Chicago	Hwang Ming-der (ROC)	Choi Jae-chun (KOR)	Eduardo Merchán (ESP)
1977 Chicago	Hwang Ming-der (ROC)	Choi Jae-chun (KOR)	Ernie Reyes (USA)
1979 Stuttgart	Park Oh-sung (KOR)	Greg Fears (USA)	Hubert Leuchter (FRG)
1979 Stuttgart	Park Oh-sung (KOR)	Greg Fears (USA)	Henk Horsten (NED)
1982 Guayaquil	Park Oh-sung (KOR)	Juan Rosales (ESP)	Philippe Bouedo (FRA)
1982 Guayaquil	Park Oh-sung (KOR)	Juan Rosales (ESP)	Alfonso Qahhaar (USA)
1983 Copenhagen	Han Jae-koo (KOR)	Ángel Navarrete (ESP)	Po-Nhu Ly (AUS)
1983 Copenhagen	Han Jae-koo (KOR)	Ángel Navarrete (ESP)	Michel Della Negra (FRA)
1985 Seoul	Park Bong-kwon (KOR)	Pietro Carrieri (ITA)	Reuben Thijs (NED)
1985 Seoul	Park Bong-kwon (KOR)	Pietro Carrieri (ITA)	Monsour del Rosario (PHI)
1987 Barcelona	Yang Dae-seung (KOR)	Jesús Tortosa (ESP)	Georg Streif (FRG)
1987 Barcelona	Yang Dae-seung (KOR)	Jesús Tortosa (ESP)	Steve Capener (USA)
1989 Seoul	Yang Dae-seung (KOR)	Nusret Ramazanoğlu (TUR)	Jae Hoon Lee (CAN)
1989 Seoul	Yang Dae-seung (KOR)	Nusret Ramazanoğlu (TUR)	José Rocamora (FRA)
1991 Athens	Yang Dae-seung (KOR)	Ramelito Abratique (PHI)	John Collison (AUS)
1991 Athens	Yang Dae-seung (KOR)	Ramelito Abratique (PHI)	Hiang Ming-jen (TPE)
1993 New York City	Park Se-jin (KOR)	Victor Luke (CAN)	Aziz Acharki (GER)
1993 New York City	Park Se-jin (KOR)	Victor Luke (CAN)	Mustafa Dağdelen (TUR)
1995 Manila	Aziz Acharki (GER)	Roberto Estrada (MEX)	Fariborz Askari (IRI)
1995 Manila	Aziz Acharki (GER)	Roberto Estrada (MEX)	David Gonzales (SWE)
1997 Hong Kong	Tamer Abdelmoneim Hussein (EGY)	Christophe Negrel (FRA)	Shim Ki-sun (KOR)
1997 Hong Kong	Tamer Abdelmoneim Hussein (EGY)	Christophe Negrel (FRA)	Zoran Krajčinović (YUG)
1999 Edmonton	Hadi Saei (IRI)	Kim Byung-uk (KOR)	Sergio Cárdenas (CHI)
1999 Edmonton	Hadi Saei (IRI)	Kim Byung-uk (KOR)	Rosendo Alonso (ESP)
2001 Jeju	Steven López (USA)	Jesper Roesen (DEN)	Athanasios Balilis (GRE)
2001 Jeju	Steven López (USA)	Jesper Roesen (DEN)	José Luis Ramírez (MEX)
2003 Garmisch-P.	Kim Kyo-sik (KOR)	Hadi Saei (IRI)	Tuncay Çalışkan (AUT)
2003 Garmisch-P.	Kim Kyo-sik (KOR)	Hadi Saei (IRI)	Rashad Ahmadov (AZE)
2005 Madrid	Hadi Saei (IRI)	Alan Akoev (RUS)	Takahiro Niimi (JPN)
2005 Madrid	Hadi Saei (IRI)	Alan Akoev (RUS)	Carlos Vásquez (VEN)
2007 Beijing	Sung Yu-chi (TPE)	Nesar Ahmad Bahave (AFG)	Hadi Saei (IRI)
2007 Beijing	Sung Yu-chi (TPE)	Nesar Ahmad Bahave (AFG)	Tommy Mollet (NED)
2009 Copenhagen	Kim Joon-tae (KOR)	Maxime Potvin (CAN)	Mokdad Ounis (GER)
2009 Copenhagen	Kim Joon-tae (KOR)	Maxime Potvin (CAN)	Mark López (USA)
2011 Gyeongju	Alireza Nasr Azadani (IRI)	Patiwat Thongsalap (THA)	Ismaël Coulibaly (MLI)
2011 Gyeongju	Alireza Nasr Azadani (IRI)	Patiwat Thongsalap (THA)	Rıdvan Baygut (TUR)
2013 Puebla	Uriel Adriano (MEX)	Albert Gaun (RUS)	Kim Yoo-jin (KOR)
2013 Puebla	Uriel Adriano (MEX)	Albert Gaun (RUS)	Saifeddine Trabelsi (TUN)
2015 Chelyabinsk	Masoud Hajji-Zavareh (IRI)	Nikita Rafalovich (UZB)	Ismaël Coulibaly (MLI)
2015 Chelyabinsk	Masoud Hajji-Zavareh (IRI)	Nikita Rafalovich (UZB)	Albert Gaun (RUS)
2017 Muju	Maksim Khramtsov (RUS)	Nikita Rafalovich (UZB)	Masoud Hajji-Zavareh (IRI)
2017 Muju	Maksim Khramtsov (RUS)	Nikita Rafalovich (UZB)	Kairat Sarymsakov (KAZ)
2019 Manchester	Simone Alessio (ITA)	Ahmad Abughaush (JOR)	Daniel Quesada (ESP)
2019 Manchester	Simone Alessio (ITA)	Ahmad Abughaush (JOR)	Kairat Sarymsakov (KAZ)
2022 Guadalajara	Daniel Quesada (ESP)	Edival Pontes (BRA)	Stefan Takov (SRB)
2022 Guadalajara	Daniel Quesada (ESP)	Edival Pontes (BRA)	Firas Katoussi (TUN)
2023 Baku	Marko Golubić (CRO)	Stefan Takov (SRB)	Kadyrbech Daurov (AIN)
2023 Baku	Marko Golubić (CRO)	Stefan Takov (SRB)	Leon Sejranovic (AUS)
2025 Wuxi	Najmiddin Kosimkhojiev (UZB)	Edival Pontes (BRA)	Magomed Abdusalamov (AIN)
2025 Wuxi	Najmiddin Kosimkhojiev (UZB)	Edival Pontes (BRA)	Amir Sina Bakhtiari (IRI)

== Welterweight ==
- −73 kg: 1975–1977
- −68 kg: 1979–1983
- −76 kg: 1985–1997
- −78 kg: 1999–2007
- −80 kg: 2009–

Championships	Gold	Silver	Bronze
1975 Seoul	Hur Song (KOR)	Liang Ping-hui (ROC)	Théophile Dossou (CIV)
1975 Seoul	Hur Song (KOR)	Liang Ping-hui (ROC)	A. F. Odut (UGA)
1977 Chicago	Yoo Yong-hap (KOR)	Théophile Dossou (CIV)	Rainer Müller (FRG)
1977 Chicago	Yoo Yong-hap (KOR)	Théophile Dossou (CIV)	Manuel Jurado (MEX)
1979 Stuttgart	Óscar Mendiola (MEX)	Lindsay Lawrence (GBR)	Helmut Gärtner (FRG)
1979 Stuttgart	Óscar Mendiola (MEX)	Lindsay Lawrence (GBR)	Kim Moo-chun (KOR)
1982 Guayaquil	Park Cheon-jae (KOR)	Óscar Mendiola (MEX)	José Alonso (ESP)
1982 Guayaquil	Park Cheon-jae (KOR)	Óscar Mendiola (MEX)	Lindsay Lawrence (GBR)
1983 Copenhagen	Yılmaz Helvacıoğlu (TUR)	Lindsay Lawrence (GBR)	Harald Scharmann (FRG)
1983 Copenhagen	Yılmaz Helvacıoğlu (TUR)	Lindsay Lawrence (GBR)	Choi Kwang-keun (KOR)
1985 Seoul	Jeong Kook-hyun (KOR)	Metin Şahin (TUR)	Patrice Remarck (CIV)
1985 Seoul	Jeong Kook-hyun (KOR)	Metin Şahin (TUR)	Jay Warwick (USA)
1987 Barcelona	Jeong Kook-hyun (KOR)	Juan Wright (ESP)	Thorsten Gernhardt (FRG)
1987 Barcelona	Jeong Kook-hyun (KOR)	Juan Wright (ESP)	Jay Warwick (USA)
1989 Seoul	Lee Hyun-suk (KOR)	Humberto Norambuena (CHI)	Khaled Fawzy (EGY)
1989 Seoul	Lee Hyun-suk (KOR)	Humberto Norambuena (CHI)	Dante Pena (PHI)
1991 Athens	Park Yong-woon (KOR)	James Villasana (USA)	Hisashi Kondo (JPN)
1991 Athens	Park Yong-woon (KOR)	James Villasana (USA)	Hugo García (MEX)
1993 New York City	Lim Yong-ho (KOR)	Liu Tsu-ien (TPE)	Andreas Pilavakis (CYP)
1993 New York City	Lim Yong-ho (KOR)	Liu Tsu-ien (TPE)	Ahmed Zahran (EGY)
1995 Manila	José Jesús Márquez (ESP)	Jean López (USA)	Nico Davis (SWE)
1995 Manila	José Jesús Márquez (ESP)	Jean López (USA)	Liu Tsu-ien (TPE)
1997 Hong Kong	José Jesús Márquez (ESP)	Marco Scheiterbauer (GER)	Majid Aflaki (IRI)
1997 Hong Kong	José Jesús Márquez (ESP)	Marco Scheiterbauer (GER)	Kim Kyong-hun (KOR)
1999 Edmonton	Jang Jong-oh (KOR)	Bahri Tanrıkulu (TUR)	Rodrigo Martínez (MEX)
1999 Edmonton	Jang Jong-oh (KOR)	Bahri Tanrıkulu (TUR)	Josh Coleman (USA)
2001 Jeju	Mamedy Doucara (FRA)	Mahmoud Napelion (EGY)	Marcin Chorzelewski (POL)
2001 Jeju	Mamedy Doucara (FRA)	Mahmoud Napelion (EGY)	Bekir Aydın (TUR)
2003 Garmisch-P.	Steven López (USA)	Mohamed Ebnoutalib (GER)	Rosendo Alonso (ESP)
2003 Garmisch-P.	Steven López (USA)	Mohamed Ebnoutalib (GER)	Oh Seon-taek (KOR)
2005 Madrid	Steven López (USA)	Ali Tajik (IRI)	Daniel Jukic (AUS)
2005 Madrid	Steven López (USA)	Ali Tajik (IRI)	Rosendo Alonso (ESP)
2007 Beijing	Steven López (USA)	Jang Chang-ha (KOR)	Sébastien Michaud (CAN)
2007 Beijing	Steven López (USA)	Jang Chang-ha (KOR)	Balázs Tóth (HUN)
2009 Copenhagen	Steven López (USA)	Nicolás García (ESP)	Rashad Ahmadov (AZE)
2009 Copenhagen	Steven López (USA)	Nicolás García (ESP)	Sébastien Michaud (CAN)
2011 Gyeongju	Farzad Abdollahi (IRI)	Yunus Sarı (TUR)	Ramin Azizov (AZE)
2011 Gyeongju	Farzad Abdollahi (IRI)	Yunus Sarı (TUR)	Issam Chernoubi (MAR)
2013 Puebla	Tahir Güleç (GER)	René Lizárraga (MEX)	Nicolás García (ESP)
2013 Puebla	Tahir Güleç (GER)	René Lizárraga (MEX)	Anton Kotkov (RUS)
2015 Chelyabinsk	Mehdi Khodabakhshi (IRI)	Damon Sansum (GBR)	Tahir Güleç (GER)
2015 Chelyabinsk	Mehdi Khodabakhshi (IRI)	Damon Sansum (GBR)	Aaron Cook (MDA)
2017 Muju	Milad Beigi (AZE)	Anton Kotkov (RUS)	Damon Sansum (GBR)
2017 Muju	Milad Beigi (AZE)	Anton Kotkov (RUS)	Aaron Cook (MDA)
2019 Manchester	Milad Beigi (AZE)	Apostolos Telikostoglou (GRE)	Moisés Hernández (DOM)
2019 Manchester	Milad Beigi (AZE)	Apostolos Telikostoglou (GRE)	Park Woo-hyeok (KOR)
2022 Guadalajara	Park Woo-hyeok (KOR)	Andoni Cintado (ESP)	Seif Eissa (EGY)
2022 Guadalajara	Park Woo-hyeok (KOR)	Andoni Cintado (ESP)	Mehran Barkhordari (IRI)
2023 Baku	Simone Alessio (ITA)	CJ Nickolas (USA)	Miguel Trejos (COL)
2023 Baku	Simone Alessio (ITA)	CJ Nickolas (USA)	Seif Eissa (EGY)
2025 Wuxi	Henrique Marques (BRA)	Xiang Qizhang (CHN)	Artem Mytarev (AIN)
2025 Wuxi	Henrique Marques (BRA)	Xiang Qizhang (CHN)	Seo Geon-woo (KOR)

== Light middleweight ==
- −73 kg: 1979–1983

Championships	Gold	Silver	Bronze
1979 Stuttgart	Rainer Müller (FRG)	Guillermo Aragonés (MEX)	Park Chung-ho (KOR)
1979 Stuttgart	Rainer Müller (FRG)	Guillermo Aragonés (MEX)	Hans Brugmans (NED)
1982 Guayaquil	Jeong Kook-hyun (KOR)	Duvan Cangá (ECU)	Francisco Garrido (ESP)
1982 Guayaquil	Jeong Kook-hyun (KOR)	Duvan Cangá (ECU)	Helmut Gärtner (FRG)
1983 Copenhagen	Jeong Kook-hyun (KOR)	Hans Brugmans (NED)	Patrice Remarck (CIV)
1983 Copenhagen	Jeong Kook-hyun (KOR)	Hans Brugmans (NED)	Luigi D'Oriano (ITA)

== Middleweight ==
- −80 kg: 1975–1977
- −78 kg: 1979–1983
- −83 kg: 1985–1997
- −84 kg: 1999–2007
- −87 kg: 2009–

Championships	Gold	Silver	Bronze
1975 Seoul	Yang Young-kwon (KOR)	Steve Pound (GUM)	Alejandro Chacón (CRC)
1975 Seoul	Yang Young-kwon (KOR)	Steve Pound (GUM)	Chang Hsiang-hsing (ROC)
1977 Chicago	Hur Song (KOR)	James Kirby (USA)	Manuel Salcedo (ESP)
1977 Chicago	Hur Song (KOR)	James Kirby (USA)	Carlos Obregón (MEX)
1979 Stuttgart	Kim Sang-chun (KOR)	Richard Schulz (FRG)	Byl Be Yao (CIV)
1979 Stuttgart	Kim Sang-chun (KOR)	Richard Schulz (FRG)	John Holloway (USA)
1982 Guayaquil	Kim Sang-chun (KOR)	Rashid Hassan Bado (BRN)	Javier Mayen (MEX)
1982 Guayaquil	Kim Sang-chun (KOR)	Rashid Hassan Bado (BRN)	Earl Taylor (USA)
1983 Copenhagen	Lee Dong-jun (KOR)	Jersey Long (CAN)	Charles Bayou (CIV)
1983 Copenhagen	Lee Dong-jun (KOR)	Jersey Long (CAN)	Jay Warwick (USA)
1985 Seoul	Lee Dong-jun (KOR)	Hassan Zahedi (IRI)	Amr Khairy (EGY)
1985 Seoul	Lee Dong-jun (KOR)	Hassan Zahedi (IRI)	Douglas Crowper (USA)
1987 Barcelona	Lee Kye-haeng (KOR)	Francisco Jiménez (ESP)	Ammar Fahed Sbeihi (JOR)
1987 Barcelona	Lee Kye-haeng (KOR)	Francisco Jiménez (ESP)	Herbert Perez (USA)
1989 Seoul	Jeong Yong-suk (KOR)	Renzo Zenteno (CHI)	Jarl Kaila (FIN)
1989 Seoul	Jeong Yong-suk (KOR)	Renzo Zenteno (CHI)	Hassan Zahedi (IRI)
1991 Athens	Yoon Soon-cheol (KOR)	Yehia Alam (EGY)	Metin Şahin (TUR)
1991 Athens	Yoon Soon-cheol (KOR)	Yehia Alam (EGY)	Herbert Perez (USA)
1993 New York City	Mickaël Meloul (FRA)	Víctor Estrada (MEX)	Juan Wright (ESP)
1993 New York City	Mickaël Meloul (FRA)	Víctor Estrada (MEX)	Luis Noguera (VEN)
1995 Manila	Lee Dong-wan (KOR)	Ulysses Marcelino (PHI)	Mickaël Meloul (FRA)
1995 Manila	Lee Dong-wan (KOR)	Ulysses Marcelino (PHI)	Zoran Prerad (YUG)
1997 Hong Kong	Lee Dong-wan (KOR)	Alfredo Escobar (CUB)	Rubén Montesinos (ESP)
1997 Hong Kong	Lee Dong-wan (KOR)	Alfredo Escobar (CUB)	Michalis Tolios (GRE)
1999 Edmonton	Majid Aflaki (IRI)	Yasin Yağız (TUR)	Faissal Ebnoutalib (GER)
1999 Edmonton	Majid Aflaki (IRI)	Yasin Yağız (TUR)	Adilkhan Sagindykov (KAZ)
2001 Jeju	Bahri Tanrıkulu (TUR)	Mickaël Borot (FRA)	Jon García (ESP)
2001 Jeju	Bahri Tanrıkulu (TUR)	Mickaël Borot (FRA)	Kim Kyong-hun (KOR)
2003 Garmisch-P.	Yousef Karami (IRI)	Mickaël Borot (FRA)	Tavakkul Bayramov (AZE)
2003 Garmisch-P.	Yousef Karami (IRI)	Mickaël Borot (FRA)	Bahri Tanrıkulu (TUR)
2005 Madrid	Oh Seon-taek (KOR)	Jon García (ESP)	Bruno Ntep (FRA)
2005 Madrid	Oh Seon-taek (KOR)	Jon García (ESP)	Yousef Karami (IRI)
2007 Beijing	Bahri Tanrıkulu (TUR)	Tavakkul Bayramov (AZE)	Arman Chilmanov (KAZ)
2007 Beijing	Bahri Tanrıkulu (TUR)	Tavakkul Bayramov (AZE)	Park Min-soo (KOR)
2009 Copenhagen	Bahri Tanrıkulu (TUR)	Carlo Molfetta (ITA)	Yousef Karami (IRI)
2009 Copenhagen	Bahri Tanrıkulu (TUR)	Carlo Molfetta (ITA)	Vanja Babić (SRB)
2011 Gyeongju	Yousef Karami (IRI)	Cha Dong-min (KOR)	Jon García (ESP)
2011 Gyeongju	Yousef Karami (IRI)	Cha Dong-min (KOR)	Carlo Molfetta (ITA)
2013 Puebla	Rafael Alba (CUB)	Ma Zhaoyong (CHN)	Radik Isayev (AZE)
2013 Puebla	Rafael Alba (CUB)	Ma Zhaoyong (CHN)	Yassine Trabelsi (TUN)
2015 Chelyabinsk	Radik Isayev (AZE)	Jasur Baykuziyev (UZB)	Rafael Alba (CUB)
2015 Chelyabinsk	Radik Isayev (AZE)	Jasur Baykuziyev (UZB)	Vladislav Larin (RUS)
2017 Muju	Alexander Bachmann (GER)	Vladislav Larin (RUS)	In Kyo-don (KOR)
2017 Muju	Alexander Bachmann (GER)	Vladislav Larin (RUS)	Ivan Trajkovič (SLO)
2019 Manchester	Vladislav Larin (RUS)	Ícaro Miguel Soares (BRA)	Song Zhaoxiang (CHN)
2019 Manchester	Vladislav Larin (RUS)	Ícaro Miguel Soares (BRA)	Ivan Šapina (CRO)
2022 Guadalajara	Mehdi Khodabakhshi (SRB)	Meng Mingkuan (CHN)	Bryan Salazar (MEX)
2022 Guadalajara	Mehdi Khodabakhshi (SRB)	Meng Mingkuan (CHN)	Nikita Rafalovich (UZB)
2023 Baku	Kang Sang-hyun (KOR)	Ivan Šapina (CRO)	Artsiom Plonis (AIN)
2023 Baku	Kang Sang-hyun (KOR)	Ivan Šapina (CRO)	Arian Salimi (IRI)
2025 Wuxi	Seif Eissa (EGY)	Simone Alessio (ITA)	Szymon Piątkowski (POL)
2025 Wuxi	Seif Eissa (EGY)	Simone Alessio (ITA)	Artem Harbar (UKR)

== Light heavyweight ==
- −84 kg: 1979–1983

Championships	Gold	Silver	Bronze
1979 Stuttgart	Jung Chan (KOR)	Eugen Nefedow (FRG)	Abdoulaye Cissé (CIV)
1979 Stuttgart	Jung Chan (KOR)	Eugen Nefedow (FRG)	Scott Rohr (USA)
1982 Guayaquil	Ha Yong-seong (KOR)	Medhat Mansy Fahim (EGY)	Ireno Fargas (ESP)
1982 Guayaquil	Ha Yong-seong (KOR)	Medhat Mansy Fahim (EGY)	Ben Oude Luttikhuis (NED)
1983 Copenhagen	Ireno Fargas (ESP)	Eugen Nefedow (FRG)	Michael Knudsen (DEN)
1983 Copenhagen	Ireno Fargas (ESP)	Eugen Nefedow (FRG)	John Lee (USA)

== Heavyweight ==
- +64 kg: 1973
- +80 kg: 1975–1977
- +84 kg: 1979–1983
- +83 kg: 1985–1997
- +84 kg: 1999–2007
- +87 kg: 2009–

Championships	Gold	Silver	Bronze
1973 Seoul	Kim Jeong-tae (KOR)	Mike Warren (USA)	Albert Cheeks (USA)
1973 Seoul	Kim Jeong-tae (KOR)	Mike Warren (USA)	Raymond Sell (USA)
1975 Seoul	Choi Jeong-do (KOR)	Meinolf Lüttecken (FRG)	Carl Pluckham (AUS)
1975 Seoul	Choi Jeong-do (KOR)	Meinolf Lüttecken (FRG)	Lin Ying-peng (ROC)
1977 Chicago	Ahn Jang-shik (KOR)	Lin Ying-peng (ROC)	Dirk Jung (FRG)
1977 Chicago	Ahn Jang-shik (KOR)	Lin Ying-peng (ROC)	John Holloway (USA)
1979 Stuttgart	Sjef Vos (NED)	Thomas Seabourne (USA)	Keith Whittemore (AUS)
1979 Stuttgart	Sjef Vos (NED)	Thomas Seabourne (USA)	Carlos Obregón (MEX)
1982 Guayaquil	Dirk Jung (FRG)	Kim Royce (USA)	Rafael Devesa (ESP)
1982 Guayaquil	Dirk Jung (FRG)	Kim Royce (USA)	Dario Scalella (ITA)
1983 Copenhagen	Jang Seong-hwa (KOR)	Dirk Jung (FRG)	Francisco Fonseca (ESP)
1983 Copenhagen	Jang Seong-hwa (KOR)	Dirk Jung (FRG)	Henk Meijer (NED)
1985 Seoul	Henk Meijer (NED)	Kang Seung-woo (KOR)	Abdoulaye Cissé (CIV)
1985 Seoul	Henk Meijer (NED)	Kang Seung-woo (KOR)	Moustafa El-Abrak (EGY)
1987 Barcelona	Michael Arndt (FRG)	Jimmy Kim (USA)	Carmelo Medina (ESP)
1987 Barcelona	Michael Arndt (FRG)	Jimmy Kim (USA)	Mounir Boukrouh (FRA)
1989 Seoul	Amr Khairy (EGY)	Choi Sang-jin (KOR)	Victor Bateman (AUS)
1989 Seoul	Amr Khairy (EGY)	Choi Sang-jin (KOR)	Farzad Zarakhsh (IRI)
1991 Athens	Tonny Sørensen (DEN)	Oliver Schawe (GER)	Amr Khairy (EGY)
1991 Athens	Tonny Sørensen (DEN)	Oliver Schawe (GER)	Miguel Jordán (ESP)
1993 New York City	Kim Je-kyoung (KOR)	Ali Şahin (TUR)	Thierry Troudart (FRA)
1993 New York City	Kim Je-kyoung (KOR)	Ali Şahin (TUR)	Emmanuel Oghenejobo (NGR)
1995 Manila	Kim Je-kyoung (KOR)	Pascal Gentil (FRA)	Lúcio Aurélio de Freitas (BRA)
1995 Manila	Kim Je-kyoung (KOR)	Pascal Gentil (FRA)	Massimiliano Romano (ITA)
1997 Hong Kong	Kim Je-kyoung (KOR)	Hassan Aslani (IRI)	Nelson Sáenz (CUB)
1997 Hong Kong	Kim Je-kyoung (KOR)	Hassan Aslani (IRI)	Khaled Al-Dosari (KSA)
1999 Edmonton	Moon Dae-sung (KOR)	Moctar Doumbia (FRA)	Daniel Trenton (AUS)
1999 Edmonton	Moon Dae-sung (KOR)	Moctar Doumbia (FRA)	Rubén Montesinos (ESP)
2001 Jeju	Ferry Greevink (NED)	Hadi Afshar (IRI)	Mici Kuzmanović (CRO)
2001 Jeju	Ferry Greevink (NED)	Hadi Afshar (IRI)	Rubén Montesinos (ESP)
2003 Garmisch-P.	Morteza Rostami (IRI)	Zakaria Asidah (DEN)	Mici Kuzmanović (CRO)
2003 Garmisch-P.	Morteza Rostami (IRI)	Zakaria Asidah (DEN)	Lin Wen-cheng (TPE)
2005 Madrid	Rubén Montesinos (ESP)	Abdelkader Zrouri (MAR)	Leonardo Basile (ITA)
2005 Madrid	Rubén Montesinos (ESP)	Abdelkader Zrouri (MAR)	Heo Jun-nyung (KOR)
2007 Beijing	Daba Modibo Keïta (MLI)	Morteza Rostami (IRI)	Nam Yun-bae (KOR)
2007 Beijing	Daba Modibo Keïta (MLI)	Morteza Rostami (IRI)	Abdelkader Zrouri (MAR)
2009 Copenhagen	Daba Modibo Keïta (MLI)	Nam Yun-bae (KOR)	Hossein Tajik (IRI)
2009 Copenhagen	Daba Modibo Keïta (MLI)	Nam Yun-bae (KOR)	Arman Chilmanov (KAZ)
2011 Gyeongju	Jo Chol-ho (KOR)	Akmal Irgashev (UZB)	Andreas Stylianou (CYP)
2011 Gyeongju	Jo Chol-ho (KOR)	Akmal Irgashev (UZB)	Kourosh Rajoli (IRI)
2013 Puebla	Anthony Obame (GAB)	Sajjad Mardani (IRI)	Robelis Despaigne (CUB)
2013 Puebla	Anthony Obame (GAB)	Sajjad Mardani (IRI)	Ivan Trajkovič (SLO)
2015 Chelyabinsk	Dmitriy Shokin (UZB)	Firmin Zokou (CIV)	Robelis Despaigne (CUB)
2015 Chelyabinsk	Dmitriy Shokin (UZB)	Firmin Zokou (CIV)	Anthony Obame (GAB)
2017 Muju	Abdoul Razak Issoufou (NIG)	Mahama Cho (GBR)	Anthony Obame (GAB)
2017 Muju	Abdoul Razak Issoufou (NIG)	Mahama Cho (GBR)	Roman Kuznetsov (RUS)
2019 Manchester	Rafael Alba (CUB)	Carlos Sansores (MEX)	Maicon Andrade (BRA)
2019 Manchester	Rafael Alba (CUB)	Carlos Sansores (MEX)	Hamza Kattan (JOR)
2022 Guadalajara	Carlos Sansores (MEX)	Iván García (ESP)	Song Zhaoxiang (CHN)
2022 Guadalajara	Carlos Sansores (MEX)	Iván García (ESP)	Sajjad Mardani (IRI)
2023 Baku	Cheick Sallah Cissé (CIV)	Carlos Sansores (MEX)	Paško Božić (CRO)
2023 Baku	Cheick Sallah Cissé (CIV)	Carlos Sansores (MEX)	Emre Kutalmış Ateşli (TUR)
2025 Wuxi	Kang Sang-hyun (KOR)	Rafail Aiukaev (AIN)	Caden Cunningham (GBR)
2025 Wuxi	Kang Sang-hyun (KOR)	Rafail Aiukaev (AIN)	Jonathan Healy (USA)

== Medal table ==
Rank	Nation	Gold	Silver	Bronze	Total
1	South Korea	117	13	24	154
2	Iran	15	20	27	62
3	Spain	11	18	39	68
4	Turkey	8	13	17	38
5	United States	6	14	35	55
6	Chinese Taipei	6	12	17	35
7	Azerbaijan	4	1	10	15
8	Mexico	3	24	26	53
9	West Germany	3	8	18	29
10	Italy	3	5	13	21
11	Egypt	3	3	11	17
12	Germany	3	3	6	12
13	China	3	3	5	11
14	Netherlands	3	2	12	17
15	Cuba	3	1	4	8
16	Russia	2	8	9	19
17	Great Britain	2	7	5	14
18	France	2	6	9	17
19	Uzbekistan	2	6	4	12
20	Denmark	2	6	1	9
21	Thailand	2	4	6	12
22	Croatia	2	1	5	8
23	Mali	2	0	2	4
24	Brazil	1	6	7	14
25	Ivory Coast	1	3	11	15
26	Ecuador	1	2	1	4
27	Serbia	1	1	2	4
28	World Taekwondo Federation^{a}	1	1	0	2
29	Tunisia	1	0	4	5
30	Gabon	1	0	2	3
30	Hungary	1	0	2	3
32	Niger	1	0	0	1
33	Philippines	0	5	6	11
34	Canada	0	5	4	9
–	Individual Neutral Athletes^{b}	0	3	4	7
35	Afghanistan	0	2	2	4
36	Chile	0	2	1	3
37	Australia	0	1	11	12
38	Jordan	0	1	7	8
39	Morocco	0	1	4	5
40	Greece	0	1	3	4
41	Portugal	0	1	1	2
42	Bahrain	0	1	0	1
42	Guam	0	1	0	1
42	Indonesia	0	1	0	1
45	Kazakhstan	0	0	6	6
46	Dominican Republic	0	0	5	5
47	Japan	0	0	4	4
47	Vietnam	0	0	4	4
49	Saudi Arabia	0	0	3	3
49	Sweden	0	0	3	3
51	Argentina	0	0	2	2
51	Cyprus	0	0	2	2
51	Malaysia	0	0	2	2
51	Moldova	0	0	2	2
51	Poland	0	0	2	2
51	Senegal	0	0	2	2
51	Serbia and Montenegro	0	0	2	2
51	Slovenia	0	0	2	2
51	Venezuela	0	0	2	2
60	Austria	0	0	1	1
60	Belgium	0	0	1	1
60	Bulgaria	0	0	1	1
60	Colombia	0	0	1	1
60	Costa Rica	0	0	1	1
60	Finland	0	0	1	1
60	Israel	0	0	1	1
60	Nepal	0	0	1	1
60	Nigeria	0	0	1	1
60	Switzerland	0	0	1	1
60	Uganda	0	0	1	1
60	Ukraine	0	0	1	1
Totals (71 entries)		216	216	432	864

a At the 2015 World Championships, athletes from Belgium competed as World Taekwondo Federation (WTF) due to the suspension of the country's Taekwondo Federation.
b At the 2023 and 2025 World Championships, athletes from Russia and Belarus in accordance with sanctions imposed following by the 2022 Russian invasion of Ukraine participated as Individual Neutral Athletes (AIN), their medals were not included in the official medal table.

== See also ==
- List of Olympic medalists in taekwondo
