= 1982 World Taekwondo Championships =

Taekwondo competition

- Venue: Coliseo Cerrado
- Location: Guayaquil, Ecuador
- Dates: 24–27 February 1982

Champions
- Men: South Korea

The 1982 World Taekwondo Championships are the 5th edition of the World Taekwondo Championships, and were held in Guayaquil, Ecuador from February 24 to February 27, 1982. A total of 229 athletes from 35 nations took part in the championships.

== Medal summary ==
Event	Gold	Silver	Bronze
Finweight (−48 kg)	José Cedeño; Ecuador	César Rodríguez; Mexico	Dae Sung Lee; United States
Finweight (−48 kg)	José Cedeño; Ecuador	César Rodríguez; Mexico	Emilio Azofra; Spain
Flyweight (−52 kg)	Jeon Woong-hwan; South Korea	Su Chen-chia; Chinese Taipei	Turgay Ertuğrul; West Germany
Flyweight (−52 kg)	Jeon Woong-hwan; South Korea	Su Chen-chia; Chinese Taipei	Fernando Celada; Mexico
Bantamweight (−56 kg)	Kim Yong-ki; South Korea	Jesús Benito; Spain	Jimmy de Fretes; Netherlands
Bantamweight (−56 kg)	Kim Yong-ki; South Korea	Jesús Benito; Spain	Chung Sik Choi; United States
Featherweight (−60 kg)	Chang Myung-sam; South Korea	Ignacio Blanco; Mexico	Raffaele Marchione; Italy
Featherweight (−60 kg)	Chang Myung-sam; South Korea	Ignacio Blanco; Mexico	Kao Ming-lu; Chinese Taipei
Lightweight (−64 kg)	Park Oh-sung; South Korea	Juan Rosales; Spain	Alfonso Qahhaar; United States
Lightweight (−64 kg)	Park Oh-sung; South Korea	Juan Rosales; Spain	Philippe Bouedo; France
Welterweight (−68 kg)	Park Cheon-jae; South Korea	Óscar Mendiola; Mexico	José Alonso; Spain
Welterweight (−68 kg)	Park Cheon-jae; South Korea	Óscar Mendiola; Mexico	Lindsay Lawrence; Great Britain
Light middleweight (−73 kg)	Jeong Kook-hyun; South Korea	Duvan Cangá; Ecuador	Francisco Garrido; Spain
Light middleweight (−73 kg)	Jeong Kook-hyun; South Korea	Duvan Cangá; Ecuador	Helmut Gärtner; West Germany
Middleweight (−78 kg)	Kim Sang-chun; South Korea	Rashid Hassan Bado; Bahrain	Javier Mayen; Mexico
Middleweight (−78 kg)	Kim Sang-chun; South Korea	Rashid Hassan Bado; Bahrain	Earl Taylor; United States
Light heavyweight (−84 kg)	Ha Yong-seong; South Korea	Medhat Mansy Fahim; Egypt	Ben Oude Luttikhuis; Netherlands
Light heavyweight (−84 kg)	Ha Yong-seong; South Korea	Medhat Mansy Fahim; Egypt	Ireno Fargas; Spain
Heavyweight (+84 kg)	Dirk Jung; West Germany	Kim Royce; United States	Rafael Devesa; Spain
Heavyweight (+84 kg)	Dirk Jung; West Germany	Kim Royce; United States	Dario Scalella; Italy

== Medal table ==
Rank	Nation	Gold	Silver	Bronze	Total
1	South Korea	8	0	0	8
2	Ecuador	1	1	0	2
3	West Germany	1	0	2	3
4	Mexico	0	3	2	5
5	Spain	0	2	5	7
6	United States	0	1	4	5
7	Chinese Taipei	0	1	1	2
8	Bahrain	0	1	0	1
8	Egypt	0	1	0	1
10	Italy	0	0	2	2
10	Netherlands	0	0	2	2
12	France	0	0	1	1
12	Great Britain	0	0	1	1
Totals (13 entries)		10	10	20	40
