= María Jesús Santolaria =

Spanish taekwondo practitioner

Personal information
- Nationality: Spanish

Sport
- Sport: Taekwondo
Medal record
Representing Spain
Women's taekwondo
World Championships
Gold medal – first place	1993 New York City	Lightweight

María Jesús Santolaria is a Spanish taekwondo practitioner.

She won a gold medal in lightweight at the 1993 World Taekwondo Championships in New York City, by defeating Ineabelle Díaz in the semifinal, and Park Kyung-suk in the final.
