= Chun Yang-hsi =

Taiwanese taekwondo practitioner

Personal information
- Nationality: Taiwanese

Sport
- Sport: Taekwondo
Medal record
Representing Chinese Taipei
Women's taekwondo
World Championships
Bronze medal – third place	1989 Seoul	Heavyweight

Chun Yang-hsi is a Taiwanese taekwondo practitioner. She won a bronze medal in heavyweight at the 1989 World Taekwondo Championships in Seoul, after being defeated by Jung Wan-sook in the semi-final. She also competed at the 1991 World Taekwondo Championships in Athens, where she reached the quarter-final.
