= You Su-mi =

South Korean taekwondo practitioner

Personal information
- Nationality: South Korean

Sport
- Sport: Taekwondo
Medal record
Representing South Korea
Women's taekwondo
World Championships
Gold medal – first place	1993 New York City	Flyweight

You Su-mi is a South Korean taekwondo practitioner.

She won a gold medal in flyweight at the 1993 World Taekwondo Championships in New York City, after defeating Águeda Pérez López in the final.
