= Andreas Pilavakis =

Andreas Pilavakis may refer to:

- Andreas Pilavakis (alpine skier) (born 1959), Cypriot alpine skier
- Andreas Pilavakis (taekwondo) (born 1960), Cypriot taekwondo athlete
