= Isabel Cruzado =

Spanish taekwondo practitioner

Personal information
- Nationality: Spanish

Sport
- Sport: Taekwondo
Medal record
Representing Spain
Women's taekwondo
World Championships
Gold medal – first place	1993 New York City	Finweight

Isabel Cruzado is a Spanish taekwondo practitioner.

She won a gold medal in finweight at the 1993 World Taekwondo Championships in New York City, by defeating Gonca Güler in the semifinal, and Rahmi Kurnia in the final.
