= Edna Díaz =

Mexican taekwondo practitioner

Personal information
- Nationality: Mexican
- Born: 24 April 1985 (age 41)

Sport
- Sport: Taekwondo
Medal record
Representing Mexico
Women's taekwondo
World Championships
Gold medal – first place	2005 Madrid	Lightweight
Pan American Championships
Bronze medal – third place	2010 Monterrey	-67 kg

Edna Gisel Díaz Acevedo (born 24 April 1985) is a Mexican taekwondo practitioner, psychologist and politician.

She won a gold medal in lightweight at the 2005 World Taekwondo Championships in Madrid, after defeating Su Li-wen in the final. She won a bronze medal at the 2010 Pan American Taekwondo Championships.

Díaz studied at Universidad del Valle de México and finished with a degree in psychology and a master's degree in sport management.

She has been active in politics since 2015. In the 2018 federal elections in Mexico, she was elected as a candidate for federal deputation for District IX in Uruapan with the Por México al Frente alliance. For 2021, the PRI, PAN and PRD named her a candidate for representation for the IX district of Uruapan with the Va por México alliance. She was re-elected and is president of the Commission for Climate Change and Sustainability.
