= 1979 World Taekwondo Championships =

Taekwondo competition

- Venue: Glaspalast Sindelfingen
- Location: Stuttgart, West Germany
- Dates: 26–28 October 1979

Champions
- Men: South Korea

The 1979 World Taekwondo Championships are the 4th edition of the World Taekwondo Championships, and were held in Sindelfingen, Stuttgart, West Germany from October 26 to October 28, 1979. A total of 453 athletes and officials from 38 nations took part in the championships.

== Medal summary ==
Event	Gold	Silver	Bronze
Finweight (−48 kg)	Lee Seung-kyung; South Korea	Jaime de Pablos; Mexico	Dae Sung Lee; United States
Finweight (−48 kg)	Lee Seung-kyung; South Korea	Jaime de Pablos; Mexico	Emilio Azofra; Spain
Flyweight (−52 kg)	Yang Ki-mo; South Korea	Jesús Benito; Spain	Ramiro Guzmán; Mexico
Flyweight (−52 kg)	Yang Ki-mo; South Korea	Jesús Benito; Spain	Bachir Ouazzani; Morocco
Bantamweight (−56 kg)	Kim Yong-ki; South Korea	Pablo Arizmendi; Mexico	Chung Sik Choi; United States
Bantamweight (−56 kg)	Kim Yong-ki; South Korea	Pablo Arizmendi; Mexico	Dragan Veljović; West Germany
Featherweight (−60 kg)	Yim Dai-taik; South Korea	Reynaldo Salazar; Mexico	Bernd Bartsch; West Germany
Featherweight (−60 kg)	Yim Dai-taik; South Korea	Reynaldo Salazar; Mexico	Martin Hall; Australia
Lightweight (−64 kg)	Park Oh-sung; South Korea	Greg Fears; United States	Henk Horsten; Netherlands
Lightweight (−64 kg)	Park Oh-sung; South Korea	Greg Fears; United States	Hubert Leuchter; West Germany
Welterweight (−68 kg)	Óscar Mendiola; Mexico	Lindsay Lawrence; Great Britain	Helmut Gärtner; West Germany
Welterweight (−68 kg)	Óscar Mendiola; Mexico	Lindsay Lawrence; Great Britain	Kim Moo-chun; South Korea
Light middleweight (−73 kg)	Rainer Müller; West Germany	Guillermo Aragonés; Mexico	Park Chung-ho; South Korea
Light middleweight (−73 kg)	Rainer Müller; West Germany	Guillermo Aragonés; Mexico	Hans Brugmans; Netherlands
Middleweight (−78 kg)	Kim Sang-chun; South Korea	Richard Schulz; West Germany	Byl Be Yao; Ivory Coast
Middleweight (−78 kg)	Kim Sang-chun; South Korea	Richard Schulz; West Germany	John Holloway; United States
Light heavyweight (−84 kg)	Jung Chan; South Korea	Eugen Nefedow; West Germany	Scott Rohr; United States
Light heavyweight (−84 kg)	Jung Chan; South Korea	Eugen Nefedow; West Germany	Abdoulaye Cissé; Ivory Coast
Heavyweight (+84 kg)	Sjef Vos; Netherlands	Thomas Seabourne; United States	Keith Whittemore; Australia
Heavyweight (+84 kg)	Sjef Vos; Netherlands	Thomas Seabourne; United States	Carlos Obregón; Mexico

== Medal table ==
Rank	Nation	Gold	Silver	Bronze	Total
1	South Korea	7	0	2	9
2	Mexico	1	4	2	7
3	West Germany	1	2	4	7
4	Netherlands	1	0	2	3
5	United States	0	2	4	6
6	Spain	0	1	1	2
7	Great Britain	0	1	0	1
8	Australia	0	0	2	2
8	Ivory Coast	0	0	2	2
10	Morocco	0	0	1	1
Totals (10 entries)		10	10	20	40
