= Park Kyung-suk =

Park Kyung-suk may refer to:

- Park Kyung-suk (handballer) (박경석)
- Park Kyung-suk (taekwondo) (박경숙)
