= 2009 World Taekwondo Championships – Men's lightweight =

Taekwondo competition

Men's lightweight at the 2009 World Championships
- Venue: Ballerup Super Arena
- Dates: 18 October 2009
- Competitors: 82 from 82 nations

Medalists
gold medal	Kim Joon-tae	South Korea
silver medal	Maxime Potvin	Canada
bronze medal	Mark López	United States
bronze medal	Mokdad Ounis	Germany

The Men's lightweight competition at the 2009 World Taekwondo Championships was held at the Ballerup Super Arena in Copenhagen, Denmark on 18 October.

Lightweights were limited to a maximum of 74 kilograms in body mass.

== Results ==
Legend

- DQ — Won by disqualification
- WD — Won by withdrawal

=== Finals ===
Quarterfinals		Semifinals		Final
Mark López (USA)	5
Patiwat Thongsalap (THA)	3	Mark López (USA)	5
Kim Joon-tae (KOR)	4	Kim Joon-tae (KOR)	7
Uriel Adriano (MEX)	0			Kim Joon-tae (KOR)	5
Seydina Drabo (BUR)	0			Maxime Potvin (CAN)	2
Mokdad Ounis (GER)	10	Mokdad Ounis (GER)	3
Maxime Potvin (CAN)	15	Maxime Potvin (CAN)	6
Alireza Nasr Azadani (IRI)	14

=== Top half ===
==== Section 1 ====
Round of 128
Thabo Tsupane (LES)	1
Licínio Soares (BRA)	2
~~Sultan Al-Mutairi (KUW)~~
Mohamed Mahmoudi (ALG)	DQ
Stuardo Solórzano (GUA)	3
Arjun Rawat (IND)	2

Round of 64
Mark López (USA)	1
Licínio Soares (BRA)	0
Juan Sánchez (PUR)	3
Viktor Yuza (UKR)	2
Manuel Mark (AUT)	6
Mohamed Mahmoudi (ALG)	3
Stuardo Solórzano (GUA)	2
Fabio Sottile (ITA)	0

Round of 32
Mark López (USA)	4
Juan Sánchez (PUR)	3
Manuel Mark (AUT)	4
Stuardo Solórzano (GUA)	0

Round of 16
Mark López (USA)	5
Manuel Mark (AUT)	2

==== Section 2 ====
Round of 128
Masoud Karimi (AFG)	DQ
~~Bernard Lorde (BAR)~~
Alexandru Chivu (ROU)	DQ
~~Yahya Mahamud (KEN)~~

Round of 64
Patiwat Thongsalap (THA)	12
Masoud Karimi (AFG)	7
Rasul Abduraim (KGZ)	3
Vitali Kolas (BLR)	3
Anestis Nikolaidis (GRE)	3
Phạm Hữu Sơn (VIE)	2
Alexandru Chivu (ROU)	1
Nabil Talal (JOR)	14

Round of 32
Patiwat Thongsalap (THA)	7
Vitali Kolas (BLR)	6
Anestis Nikolaidis (GRE)	5
Nabil Talal (JOR)	4

Round of 16
Patiwat Thongsalap (THA)	7
Anestis Nikolaidis (GRE)	5

==== Section 3 ====
Round of 128
Kim Joon-tae (KOR)	12
Dmitriy Smorodin (KAZ)	1
Win Tun Linn (MYA)	5
Cristian Seijo (ESP)	6

Round of 64
Gorome Karé (SEN)	4
Kim Joon-tae (KOR)	5
Sonam Penjor (BHU)	3
Andrés Sebastián (DOM)	18
Tseng Ching-hsiang (TPE)	5
Tommy Mollet (NED)	8
Cristian Seijo (ESP)	9
Issam Chernoubi (MAR)	8

Round of 32
Kim Joon-tae (KOR)	9
Andrés Sebastián (DOM)	5
Tommy Mollet (NED)	8
Cristian Seijo (ESP)	9

Round of 16
Kim Joon-tae (KOR)	7
Cristian Seijo (ESP)	2

==== Section 4 ====
Round of 128
Juan Carlos Leslye (CHI)	3
Atief Arshad (PAK)	2
Fernando Montenegro (BOL)	0
Marc-Olivier Tschibelu (COD)	7

Round of 64
Uriel Adriano (MEX)	2
Juan Carlos Leslye (CHI)	1
~~Jonathan Ben Aharon (ISR)~~
Alan Akoev (RUS)	DQ
Ramin Azizov (AZE)	8
Lenn Hypolite (TRI)	4
Marc-Olivier Tschibelu (COD)	1
Rıdvan Baygut (TUR)	10

Round of 32
Uriel Adriano (MEX)	3
Alan Akoev (RUS)	2
Ramin Azizov (AZE)	3
Rıdvan Baygut (TUR)	4

Round of 16
Uriel Adriano (MEX)	7
Rıdvan Baygut (TUR)	5

=== Bottom half ===
==== Section 5 ====
Round of 128
~~Michel Samaha (LIB)~~
Filip Komurka (CZE)	DQ
Li Lai (CHN)	11
Matija Šantić (CRO)	7

Round of 64
Mahmoud Abd Rabou (EGY)	6
Filip Komurka (CZE)	1
Andrés Rivera (COL)	3
Seydina Drabo (BUR)	4
Flamur Zuberi (SUI)	4
Juan Chango (ECU)	11
Li Lai (CHN)	2
Davoud Etminani (GBR)	4

Round of 32
Mahmoud Abd Rabou (EGY)	1
Seydina Drabo (BUR)	4
Juan Chango (ECU)	4
Davoud Etminani (GBR)	3

Round of 16
Seydina Drabo (BUR)	0
Juan Chango (ECU)	0

==== Section 6 ====
Round of 128
Gino Fernald (SUR)	DQ
~~Sergio Park (PAR)~~
~~Gabriel Maseko (ZAM)~~
Mokdad Ounis (GER)	DQ

Round of 64
Dmitriy Kim (UZB)	9
Gino Fernald (SUR)	6
Sawatvilay Phimmasone (LAO)	6
Lennart Formann (DEN)	5
Thaer Alwan (IRQ)	DQ
~~Mohamed Mohamed (PLE)~~
Mokdad Ounis (GER)	DQ
~~Torann Maizeroi (FRA)~~

Round of 32
Dmitriy Kim (UZB)	7
Sawatvilay Phimmasone (LAO)	3
Thaer Alwan (IRQ)	3
Mokdad Ounis (GER)	17

Round of 16
Dmitriy Kim (UZB)	7
Mokdad Ounis (GER)	8

==== Section 7 ====
Round of 128
~~Farkhod Negmatov (TJK)~~
Obdulio Pacheco (HON)	DQ
~~Fathi Gerwash (LBA)~~
Vaughn Scott (NZL)	DQ

Round of 64
Maxime Potvin (CAN)	10
Obdulio Pacheco (HON)	2
David Rajab (GUY)
Benaiah Torkornoo (GHA)	WD
Carlos Vásquez (VEN)	6
Issa Bamba (CIV)	4
Vaughn Scott (NZL)	8
Jan Petter Hammer (NOR)	12

Round of 32
Maxime Potvin (CAN)	15
Benaiah Torkornoo (GHA)	3
Carlos Vásquez (VEN)	11
Jan Petter Hammer (NOR)	10

Round of 16
Maxime Potvin (CAN)	4
Carlos Vásquez (VEN)	4

==== Section 8 ====
Round of 128
Christos Pilavakis (CYP)	0
Kārlis Orleāns (LAT)	3
Sean Joyce (IRL)	5
David Tancik (SLO)	2
Sebastián Crismanich (ARG)	7
Bojan Bjelić (SRB)	3

Round of 64
Burak Hasan (AUS)	5
Kārlis Orleāns (LAT)	4
Sean Joyce (IRL)	4
Taisei Hojo (JPN)	4
Eduardo Rodrigues (POR)	2
István Király (HUN)	2
Sebastián Crismanich (ARG)	8
Alireza Nasr Azadani (IRI)	10

Round of 32
Burak Hasan (AUS)	2
Taisei Hojo (JPN)	4
Eduardo Rodrigues (POR)	0
Alireza Nasr Azadani (IRI)	8

Round of 16
Taisei Hojo (JPN)	0
Alireza Nasr Azadani (IRI)	8
