= Anita Silsby =

American taekwondo practitioner

Personal information
- Nationality: American

Sport
- Sport: Taekwondo
Medal record
Representing the United States
Women's taekwondo
World Championships
Gold medal – first place	1989 Seoul	Welterweight

Anita Silsby is an American taekwondo practitioner.

She won a gold medal in welterweight at the 1989 World Taekwondo Championships in Seoul, by defeating Ayse Alkaya in the semifinal, and Anne-Mieke Buijs in the final.
