= Lydia Zele =

American taekwondo practitioner

Personal information
- Nationality: American

Sport
- Sport: Taekwondo
Medal record
Representing United States
Women's taekwondo
World Championships
Gold medal – first place	1989 Seoul	Middleweight

Lydia Zele is an American taekwondo practitioner.

She won a gold medal at the 1989 World Taekwondo Championships in Seoul, by defeating Denise Parmley in the quarterfinal, Antonia Vega in the semifinal, and Marcia King in the final.
