= Jung Nam-suk =

South Korean taekwondo practitioner

Personal information
- Nationality: South Korean

Sport
- Sport: Taekwondo
Medal record
Representing South Korea
Women's taekwondo
World Championships
Gold medal – first place	1989 Seoul	Bantamweight

Jung Nam-suk is a South Korean taekwondo practitioner.

She won a gold medal in bantamweight at the 1989 World Taekwondo Championships in Seoul, by defeating Chen Yi-an in the semifinal, and Diane Murray in the final.
