= 2017–18 Iran Futsal's 1st Division =

Iranian Futsal 1st Division
- Season: 2017–18
- Champions: Sunich Saveh
- Promoted: Ahoora; Sunich Saveh
- Relegated: Daneshgah Sama; Pas Qavamin; Peyman Shahrud; Sakapakhsh Saqqez
- Matches: 133
- Goals: 792 (5.95 per match)
- Top goalscorer: 24 Goals Sajjad Masihi
- Biggest home win: Sunich 10 - 3 Est. Novin; Sunich 8 - 1 Danesh Varzesh; Balan Sanat 8 - 1 Peyman
- Biggest away win: Ramak 0 - 6 Rad Mashhad
- Highest scoring: Sunich 10 - 3 Est. Novin; Salehin 8 - 5 Ramak
- Longest winning run: Group A 10 Games: Ahoora (2nd week~12th week) Group B 7 Games: Sunich (2nd week~8th week)
- Longest unbeaten run: Group A 10 Games: Ahoora (2nd week~12th week) Group B 8 Games: Sunich (1st week~8th week)
- Longest winless run: Group A 9 Games: Peyman (9th week~18th week) Group B 10 Games: Rad Isfahan (1st week~10th week)
- Longest losing run: Group A 6 Games: Sakapakhsh (9th week~14th week) Group B 6 Games: Danesh Varzesh (7th week~12th week)

The 2017–18 Iranian Futsal 1st Division will be divided into two phases.

The league is composed of 17 teams divided into two divisions of 9 teams and 8 teams, whose teams are divided geographically. Teams will play only other teams in their own division, once at home and once away for a total of 16 matches each.

== Teams ==
Locations of clubs in 2017–18 Futsal 1st Division

=== Group A ===
Team	City	Venue	Capacity	Head coach	Past Season
Danesh Va Varzesh Fariman	Fariman	Motahari	-	(Iran) Ali Asghar Tavakoli	6th/Group B
Daneshgah Sama	Dezful	-	-	(Iran) Majid Bostani	Promoted
Esteghlal Novin	Mahshahr	Besat	-	(Iran) Iman Ahmadi	8th/Group A
Naft Omidiyeh	Omidiyeh	Velayat	-	(Iran) Mahdi Heydari	4th/Play Off
Pas Qavamin	Tehran	Dastgerdi	-	(Iran) Hossein Shams	6th/Group A
Rad Padafand Isfahan	Isfahan	-	-	(Iran) Abbas Mirzaee	8th/Group B
Shahrdari Rasht	Rasht	-	-	(Iran) Hasan Arsalani	5th/Group B
Sunich Saveh	Saveh	Fajr-e Felestin	2,500	(Iran) Alireza Radi	3rd/Play Off

=== Group B ===
Team	City	Venue	Capacity	Head coach	Past Season
Ahoora Behbahan	Behbahan	Ali ibn Abi Talib	-	(Iran) Mohsen Alipour	Promoted
Balan Sanat Shiraz	Shiraz	Shahid Abolfathi	-	(Iran) Amir Sharghi	7th/Group B
Moble Karimi	Karaj	Enghelab	-	(Iran) Mohammad Karimi	7th/Group A
Peyman Shahrud	Shahrud	-	-	(Iran) Ahmad Khoram	Promoted
Rad Padafand Mashhad	Mashhad	-	-	(Iran) Mohsen Ramezani	Replaced for Parsian Shahr-e Qods
Ramak Shahed Shiraz^{1}	Shiraz	22 Bahman	-	(Iran) Amir Hossein Barzegar	5th/Group A
Sakapakhsh Saqqez	Saqqez	-	-	(Iran) Hatam Sharifi	Promoted
Salehin Varamin	Varamin	Takhti	-	(Iran) Ali Tajik	Replaced for Haji Monsef Qaem Shahr
Shahed Tehran	Tehran	Fath ol-Mobin	-	(Iran) Saeed Daneshmand	Replaced for Azad University

- ^{1} Shahed Shiraz Renamed to Ramak Shahed Shiraz

Note: Tarh va Toseh Sabz Alvand Qazvin and Ferdosi Mashhad Withdrew from the league before the start of competition.

== League standings ==
=== Group A ===
Pos	Team	Pld	W	D	L	GF	GA	GD	Pts	Qualification or relegation
1	Sunich	14	10	2	2	61	30	+31	32	Promoted playoff
2	Est. Novin Mahshahr	14	9	2	3	50	41	+9	29	Promoted playoff
3	Sh. Rasht	14	8	4	2	43	25	+18	28	
4	Naft Omidiyeh	14	5	4	5	29	32	−3	19	
5	Danesh Varzesh	14	4	2	8	33	52	−19	14	
6	Rad Padafand Isfahan	14	3	4	7	41	45	−4	13	
7	Daneshgah Sama	14	3	4	7	41	49	−8	13	Relegation to Iran Futsal's 2nd Division
8	Pas Qavamin	14	1	4	9	23	47	−24	7	Relegation to Iran Futsal's 2nd Division

Updated to match(es) played on 19 February 2018. Source: Futsal Casa
Rules for classification: 1) points; 2) goal difference; 3) number of goals scored.

=== Group B ===
Pos	Team	Pld	W	D	L	GF	GA	GD	Pts	Qualification or relegation
1	Ahoora	16	12	0	4	57	35	+22	36	Promoted playoff
2	Moble Karimi	16	10	5	1	48	40	+8	35	Promoted playoff
3	Rad Padafand Mashhad	16	10	3	3	60	34	+26	33	
4	Balan Sanat	16	6	2	8	53	49	+4	20	
5	Ramak Shiraz	16	6	2	8	38	53	−15	20	
6	Salehin Varamin	16	5	4	7	54	53	+1	19	
7	Shahed Tehran	16	5	3	8	41	43	−2	18	
8	Sakapakhsh Saqqez	16	3	3	10	40	57	−17	12	Relegation to Iran Futsal's 2nd Division
9	Peyman Shahrud	16	2	4	10	35	62	−27	10	Relegation to Iran Futsal's 2nd Division

Updated to match(es) played on 19 February 2018. Source: Futsal Casa
Rules for classification: 1) points; 2) goal difference; 3) number of goals scored.

== Results table ==
=== Group A ===
Home \ Away	DVF	SMA	ESM	NAF	PAS	RAI	SHR	SUN
Danesh Va Varzesh Fariman		2–6	1–3	0–0	3–0	4–4	1–3	3–6
Daneshgah Sama	1–2		5–6	2–4	2–4	5–4	1–1	4–1
Est. Novin Mahshahr	6–2	6–4		2–0	5–1	3–1	1–4	2–2
Naft Omidiyeh	3–2	0–0	2–5		5–1	4–4	0–3	3–1
Pas Qavamin	3–4	3–3	1–3	2–2		0–4	2–2	1–2
Rad Padafand Isfahan	4–2	7–2	3–3	0–4	3–3		0–3	3–6
Shahrdari Rasht	5–6	3–3	5–2	4–0	4–1	3–2		3–3
Sunich Saveh	8–1	7–3	10–3	4–2	5–0	3–2	3–0	

Updated to match(es) played on 19 February 2018. Source:
Legend: Blue = home team win; Yellow = draw; Red = away team win.

=== Group B ===
Home \ Away	AHO	BAL	MKA	PEY	RAD	RAM	SAK	SAL	SHA
Ahoora		5–1	3–1	2–1	4–2	4–0	4–1	4–2	4–2
Balan Sanat	3–1		2–2	8–1	4–4	5–3	7–4	5–2	3–0
Moble Karimi	4–3	4–3		2–0	3–2	4–2	6–1	1–1	2–2
Peyman Shahrud	4–6	5–3	3–5		2–4	4–3	3–3	2–2	0–5
Rad Padafand Mashhad	0–1	3–2	2–2	6–2		5–1	5–5	5–1	3–2
Ramak Shahed Shiraz	3–2	2–1	1–2	3–2	0–6		2–0	3–3	2–2
Sakapakhsh Saqqez	2–4	4–1	5–5	5–1	1–5	1–2		3–2	0–1
Salehin Varamin	4–3	5–2	9–3	4–4	1–4	8–5	5–4		3–2
Shahed Tehran	5–7	4–3	1–2	1–1	3–4	4–6	4–1	3–2	

Updated to match(es) played on 19 February 2018. Source:
Legend: Blue = home team win; Yellow = draw; Red = away team win.

== Clubs season-progress ==
Team ╲ Round	1	2	3	4	5	6	7	8	9	10	11	12	13	14	15	16	17	18
Ahoora	L	W	W	W	W	W	B	W	W	W	W	W	L	W	L	B	W	L
Balan Sanat	B	L	W	L	D	L	W	L	W	B	W	L	W	L	D	L	W	L
Danesh Varzesh	D	W	L	W	D	W	L	B	B	L	L	L	L	L	W	L	B	B
Daneshgah Sama	D	L	D	L	L	D	W	B	B	L	W	L	W	L	D	L	B	B
Est. Novin Mahshahr	D	W	W	W	W	L	L	B	B	W	W	W	W	W	D	L	B	B
Moble Karimi	W	B	W	W	D	W	W	W	L	D	B	D	W	W	D	D	W	W
Naft Omidiyeh	D	L	D	L	L	W	W	B	B	W	W	W	L	L	D	D	B	B
Pas Qavamin	D	L	D	D	L	L	L	B	B	W	L	L	L	L	L	D	B	B
Peyman Shahrud	W	L	L	L	D	B	L	W	D	L	L	L	L	D	B	D	L	L
Rad Padafand Isfahan	D	L	L	D	D	L	L	B	B	L	L	L	W	W	D	W	B	B
Rad Padafand Mashhad	L	W	W	D	D	W	W	L	B	D	W	W	W	W	W	W	L	B
Ramak Shiraz	L	W	L	D	B	L	L	L	D	W	W	W	W	B	W	L	L	L
Sakapakhsh Saqqez	L	L	L	D	D	L	W	B	L	L	L	L	L	L	W	D	B	W
Salehin Varamin	W	L	L	B	D	W	L	W	D	L	L	D	B	D	L	W	L	W
Shahed Tehran	W	W	B	D	L	L	L	L	D	W	L	B	L	L	L	D	W	W
Sh. Rasht	D	W	D	L	W	D	W	B	B	L	W	W	W	W	D	W	B	B
Sunich	D	W	W	W	W	W	W	B	B	W	L	W	L	W	D	W	B	B

B = Bye; W = Win; D = Draw; L = Lose; W/O = Withdrew

== Play Off ==
Team 1	Agg.	Team 2	1st leg	2nd leg
Sunich	11 - 5	Moble Karimi	4 - 2	7 - 3
Est. Novin Mahshahr	7 - 8	Ahoora	5 - 3	2 - 5

- Winner Promoted to the Super League.

=== First leg ===
2 March 2018	Moble Karimi	2 - 4	Sunich	Karaj
16:00 IRST+03:30	Meysam Nouri; Mahdi Fakhrzadeh	Report	Rashid Gholipour; Hossein Soltani; Ali Morovati; Hamid Taheri	Stadium: Enghlab Arena; Referee: Abdolreza Abdolghani

2 March 2018	Est. Novin Mahshahr	5 - 3	Ahoora	Mahshahr
16:00 IRST+03:30	Iman Ahmadi 3 Ahmad Dastyaran; Naser Haji	Report	Sajjad Masihi 2 Hossein Ghapanchi	Stadium: Besat Arena; Referee: Vahid Arzpeyma

=== Return leg ===
8 March 2018	Sunich	7 - 3	Moble Karimi	Saveh
16:00 IRST+03:30	Nader Hanifi 2 Hossein Soltani 2 Reza Sepandar; Mojtaba Hassannejad; Farshid Naderi	Report	Vahid Tehrani; Elias Barati; Mahdi Rezaeiyan	Stadium: Fajr-e Felestin Hall; Referee: Ebrahim Mehrabi Afshar

8 March 2018	Ahoora	5 - 2	Est. Novin Mahshahr	Behbahan
16:00 IRST+03:30	Amir Shojaei 2 Reza Shayanpour; Sajjad Masihi; Hossein Ghapanchi	Report	Ahmad Dastyaran 2	Stadium: Ali ibn Abi Talib Arena; Referee: Ali Hafizi

== Final ==
12 March 2018	Sunich	7 - 4	Ahoora	Tehran
16:00 IRST+03:30	Hamid Taheri 2 Reza Sepandar 2 Farshid Naderi; Hossein Soltani; Nader Hanifi	Report	Reza Shayanpour 2 Amir Shojaei; Sajjad Masihi	Stadium: Handball Federation Arena; Attendance: 1.000; Referee: Amir Lameei

== See also ==
- 2017–18 Futsal Super League
- 2018 Futsal's 2nd Division
- 2017–18 Iran Pro League
- 2017–18 Azadegan League
- 2017–18 Iran Football's 2nd Division
- 2017–18 Iran Football's 3rd Division
- 2017–18 Hazfi Cup
- 2017 Iranian Super Cup
