= Reynaldo Salazar =

Mexican taekwondo athlete and trainer (1955–2020)

Personal information
- Born: Reynaldo Salazar Molina; May 7, 1955
- Died: 21 June 2020 (aged 65)

Sport
- Sport: Taekwondo
Medal record
Men's taekwondo
Representing Mexico
World Championships
Silver medal – second place	Stuttgart 1979	–60 kg
Bronze medal – third place	Chicago 1977	–58 kg
Pan American Championships
Gold medal – first place	Mexico City 1978	–58 kg

Reinaldo Salazar Molina (7 May 1955 – 21 June 2020) was a Mexican taekwondo athlete and trainer.

== Biography ==
Salazar won two medals at the World Taekwondo Championships in 1977 (Bronze) and 1979 (Silver), and the gold medal at the Pan American Taekwondo Championships of 1978. He was the father of the Olympic medal winners Óscar and Iridia Salazar. In 2006 he received the National Sports Award from Mexico for his career.

In April 2020, during the COVID-19 pandemic in Mexico, he made a visit to the hospital to treat a knee ailment. The same day he attended the Central de Abasto in Mexico City and bought supplies. The supply center he visited is one of the largest consumption centers in the world and a highly dangerous source of infection, and it is suspected that this was where he was infected by SARS-CoV-2. His condition deteriorated owing to pneumonia and high glucose level in the blood, resulting in him being intubated; after being hospitalized for nearly a month and a half, he died on 21 June 2020, at age 65.
