= Vicky Slane =

American taekwondoin

Vicky (Vicki) Stuiber Slane is an international level competitor in Taekwondo. She competed in the 1993 World Taekwondo Championships where she earned a bronze medal. Additionally she competed in the 1993 US Olympic festival where she placed second.
