= Rubén Montesinos =

Spanish taekwondo practitioner

Medal record

Representing Spain

Men's taekwondo

World Championships
Bronze medal – third place	1997 Hong Kong	Middleweight
Bronze medal – third place	2001 Jeju	Heavyweight
Gold medal – first place	2005 Madrid	Heavyweight

Rubén Montesinos Gimeno is a Spanish Taekwondo athlete. He is an eight-time Spanish National Heavyweight (+84 kg) Champion, and won the World Heavyweight Championship in Madrid in 2005.

However, Montesinos did not qualify for either the 2004 or 2008 Olympics, losing his spot to two-time European Middleweight (-84 kg) Champion Jon Garcia in the +80 kg category at the Spanish Olympic Trials.
