= Takahiro Niimi =

Japanese taekwondo practitioner

Medal record

Men's taekwondo

Representing Japan

World Championships
Bronze medal – third place	2005 Madrid	Lightweight

Takahiro Niimi (新見 能弘, Niimi Takahiro; born January 24, 1974) is a male Japanese Taekwondo practitioner. He won the bronze medal in the men's lightweight division (-72 kg) at the 2005 World Taekwondo Championships held in Madrid.
