= Emilio Azofra =

Spanish taekwondo practitioner

Personal information
- Nationality: Spanish
- Born: Emilio Azofra Iglesias; 6 August 1958 (age 67) Madrid, Spain

Sport
- Country: Spain
- Sport: Taekwondo
- Event: Men's finweight
Medal record
Representing Spain
World Championships
Bronze medal – third place	1979 Stuttgart	48 kg
Bronze medal – third place	1982 Guayaquil	48 kg
Bronze medal – third place	1983 Copenhagen	48 kg

Emilio Azofra Iglesias (Note: In this Spanish name, the first or paternal surname is Azofra and the second or maternal family name is Iglesias.) (born 6 August 1958) is a Spanish taekwondo practitioner. He competed in the men's finweight at the 1988 Summer Olympics.
