= Maxime Potvin =

Canadian taekwondo practitioner

Personal information
- Born: 3 August 1987 (age 38) Quebec City, Canada
- Height: 191 cm (6 ft 3 in)

Sport
- Sport: Taekwondo
Medal record
Men's taekwondo
Representing Canada
World Taekwondo Championships
Silver medal – second place	2009 Copenhagen	74 kg
Grand Prix
Silver medal – second place	2013 Manchester	68 kg
Pan American Games
Silver medal – second place	2015 Toronto	68 kg

Maxime Potvin (born 3 August 1987) is a Canadian taekwondo practitioner. He is a former World Championships silver medalist. In 2015, he was named to Canada's team at the 2015 Pan American Games that were held in Toronto where he received a silver medal.
