= Jung Wan-sook =

South Korean taekwondo practitioner

Personal information
- Nationality: South Korean

Sport
- Sport: Taekwondo
Medal record
Representing South Korea
Women's taekwondo
World Championships
Gold medal – first place	1989 Seoul	Heavyweight

Jung Wan-sook is a South Korean taekwondo practitioner.

She won a gold medal in heavyweight at the 1989 World Taekwondo Championships in Seoul, after defeating Yvonne Franssen in the final.
