= Dante Pena =

Dante Peña
Personal information
- Full name: Dante Peña
- Nationality: Filipino
- Occupation: Coach
- Weight: 53

Sport
- Country: Philippines
- Sport: Taekwondo
- Event: +53kg
Medal record
Representing Philippines
Men's taekwondo
Asian Championship
Silver medal – second place	1976 Melbourne	53 kg

Dante Peña is a Filipino athlete who competed in taekwondo. He won a bronze medal at the 1989 World Taekwondo Championships.

== International honors ==
World Championship
Year	Place	Medal	Category
1989	Seoul	Bronze	76 kg
