= 1975 World Taekwondo Championships =

Taekwondo competition

- Venue: Kukkiwon and Jangchung Arena
- Location: Seoul, South Korea
- Dates: 28–31 August 1975

Champions
- Men: South Korea

The 1975 World Taekwondo Championships are the 2nd edition of the World Taekwondo Championships, and were held in Seoul, South Korea from August 28 to August 31, 1975. A total of 165 athletes from 30 nations took part in the championships.

== Medal summary ==
Event	Gold	Silver	Bronze
Finweight (−48 kg)	Hwang Soo-yong; South Korea	Jaime de Pablos; Mexico	Liu Ching-wen; Republic of China
Finweight (−48 kg)	Hwang Soo-yong; South Korea	Jaime de Pablos; Mexico	Hideshi Yamane; Japan
Flyweight (−53 kg)	Han You-keun; South Korea	Liu Chin-chien; Republic of China	Jaime Martin; Philippines
Flyweight (−53 kg)	Han You-keun; South Korea	Liu Chin-chien; Republic of China	Moritz Von Nacher; Mexico
Bantamweight (−58 kg)	Son Tae-hwan; South Korea	Ramiro Guzmán; Mexico	Dennis Robinson; United States
Bantamweight (−58 kg)	Son Tae-hwan; South Korea	Ramiro Guzmán; Mexico	Hubert Leuchter; West Germany
Featherweight (−63 kg)	Lee Gyeo-sung; South Korea	Wolfgang Dahmen; West Germany	Martin Hall; Australia
Featherweight (−63 kg)	Lee Gyeo-sung; South Korea	Wolfgang Dahmen; West Germany	Hossein Rabizadeh; Iran
Lightweight (−68 kg)	Yoo Yong-hap; South Korea	Michael Adey; Australia	Wang Tieh-cheng; Republic of China
Lightweight (−68 kg)	Yoo Yong-hap; South Korea	Michael Adey; Australia	Emmanuel Paman; Ivory Coast
Welterweight (−73 kg)	Hur Song; South Korea	Liang Ping-hui; Republic of China	A. F. Odut; Uganda
Welterweight (−73 kg)	Hur Song; South Korea	Liang Ping-hui; Republic of China	Théophile Dossou; Ivory Coast
Middleweight (−80 kg)	Yang Young-kwon; South Korea	Steve Pound; Guam	Alejandro Chacón; Costa Rica
Middleweight (−80 kg)	Yang Young-kwon; South Korea	Steve Pound; Guam	Chang Hsiang-hsing; Republic of China
Heavyweight (+80 kg)	Choi Jeong-do; South Korea	Meinolf Lüttecken; West Germany	Lin Ying-peng; Republic of China
Heavyweight (+80 kg)	Choi Jeong-do; South Korea	Meinolf Lüttecken; West Germany	Carl Pluckham; Australia

== Medal table ==
Rank	Nation	Gold	Silver	Bronze	Total
1	South Korea	8	0	0	8
2	Republic of China	0	2	4	6
3	Mexico	0	2	1	3
3	West Germany	0	2	1	3
5	Australia	0	1	2	3
6	Guam	0	1	0	1
7	Ivory Coast	0	0	2	2
8	Costa Rica	0	0	1	1
8	Iran	0	0	1	1
8	Japan	0	0	1	1
8	Philippines	0	0	1	1
8	Uganda	0	0	1	1
8	United States	0	0	1	1
Totals (13 entries)		8	8	16	32
