= César Rodríguez (taekwondo) =

Mexican taekwondo practitioner

Medal record

Representing Mexico

Men's taekwondo

World Taekwondo Championships
| Silver medal – second place | 1982 Ecuador | |
| Silver medal – second place | 1983 Denmark | |

Pan American Taekwondo Championships
| Gold medal – first place | 1978 Pan American Taekwondo Championships | |
| Gold medal – first place | 1980 Pan American Taekwondo Championships | |
| Gold medal – first place | 2003 Pan American Taekwondo Championships | |

César Rodríguez Luna (born in Mexico City) is a Mexican taekwondo practitioner and international medalist. He competed at the 1982 and 1983 World Taekwondo Championships, where he received a silver in each tournament. Rodríguez is a member of the Taekwondo Hall of Fame. He is the founder and president of Absolut Taekwondo Company in Mexico, served as President of Taekwondo in Tlalpan region of Mexico City, and is author of the book Arte Taekwondo.

== Career achievements ==
- 1974- Mexican National Champion - Mexico City
- 1977- Mexican National Champion - Mexico City
- 1978- 1st Pan American Taekwondo Championships - Mexico City - Gold
- 1979- North American TKD Championships - Hawaii- Gold Medal
- 1980- North American TKD Championships - Toronto, Canada - Bronze
- 1980- Pan American Taekwondo Championships - Houston - Gold
- 1982- World Taekwondo Championships - Ecuador - Silver
- 1983- World Taekwondo Championships - Denmark - Silver
- 1987- Mexico Taekwondo Open Championships -Mexico City - Gold
- 1989- European Taekwondo Championships - Spain - Silver
- 1992- US Open Taekwondo Championships - Colorado, USA - Bronze
- 2003- Pan American Taekwondo Championships - Gold
- 2003- USA Open Taekwondo Championships - Silver
- 2003- Iberian Taekwondo Games - Silver

2022 guadalajara
