= 2005 World Taekwondo Championships =

Taekwondo competition

- Venue: Palacio de Deportes
- Location: Madrid, Spain
- Dates: 13–17 April 2005

Champions
- Men: South Korea
- Women: South Korea

The 2005 World Taekwondo Championships were the 17th edition of the World Taekwondo Championships, and were held in Madrid, Spain from 13 to 17 April 2005.

== Medal table ==
* Host nation (Spain)

Rank	Nation	Gold	Silver	Bronze	Total
1	South Korea	7	3	2	12
2	United States	3	0	1	4
3	Spain*	2	2	4	8
4	Iran	1	3	1	5
5	Brazil	1	1	0	2
6	China	1	0	1	2
6	Mexico	1	0	1	2
8	France	0	1	1	2
8	Russia	0	1	1	2
8	Turkey	0	1	1	2
11	Chinese Taipei	0	1	0	1
11	Great Britain	0	1	0	1
11	Morocco	0	1	0	1
11	Puerto Rico	0	1	0	1
15	Australia	0	0	2	2
15	Canada	0	0	2	2
15	Thailand	0	0	2	2
18	Austria	0	0	1	1
18	Belgium	0	0	1	1
18	Croatia	0	0	1	1
18	Cuba	0	0	1	1
18	Egypt	0	0	1	1
18	Germany	0	0	1	1
18	Israel	0	0	1	1
18	Italy	0	0	1	1
18	Japan	0	0	1	1
18	Netherlands	0	0	1	1
18	Senegal	0	0	1	1
18	Venezuela	0	0	1	1
18	Vietnam	0	0	1	1
Totals (30 entries)		16	16	32	64

== Medal summary ==
=== Men ===
Event	Gold	Silver	Bronze
Finweight (−54 kg)	Kim Jin-hee; South Korea	Feizollah Nafjam; Iran	Gerardo Rodríguez; Mexico
Finweight (−54 kg)	Kim Jin-hee; South Korea	Feizollah Nafjam; Iran	Seyfula Magomedov; Russia
Flyweight (−58 kg)	Ko Seok-hwa; South Korea	Behzad Khodadad; Iran	Đinh Thanh Long; Vietnam
Flyweight (−58 kg)	Ko Seok-hwa; South Korea	Behzad Khodadad; Iran	Dech Sutthikunkarn; Thailand
Bantamweight (−62 kg)	Kim Jae-sik; South Korea	Márcio Wenceslau; Brazil	Kıvanç Dinçsalman; Turkey
Bantamweight (−62 kg)	Kim Jae-sik; South Korea	Márcio Wenceslau; Brazil	Ilan Goldschmidt; Israel
Featherweight (−67 kg)	Mark López; United States	Song Myeong-seob; South Korea	Aritz Itsisoa; Spain
Featherweight (−67 kg)	Mark López; United States	Song Myeong-seob; South Korea	Dennis Bekkers; Netherlands
Lightweight (−72 kg)	Hadi Saei; Iran	Alan Akoev; Russia	Takahiro Niimi; Japan
Lightweight (−72 kg)	Hadi Saei; Iran	Alan Akoev; Russia	Carlos Vásquez; Venezuela
Welterweight (−78 kg)	Steven López; United States	Ali Tajik; Iran	Rosendo Alonso; Spain
Welterweight (−78 kg)	Steven López; United States	Ali Tajik; Iran	Daniel Jukic; Australia
Middleweight (−84 kg)	Oh Seon-taek; South Korea	Jon García; Spain	Yousef Karami; Iran
Middleweight (−84 kg)	Oh Seon-taek; South Korea	Jon García; Spain	Bruno Ntep; France
Heavyweight (+84 kg)	Rubén Montesinos; Spain	Abdelkader Zrouri; Morocco	Heo Jun-nyung; South Korea
Heavyweight (+84 kg)	Rubén Montesinos; Spain	Abdelkader Zrouri; Morocco	Leonardo Basile; Italy

=== Women ===
Event	Gold	Silver	Bronze
Finweight (−47 kg)	Belén Asensio; Spain	Yoo Eun-young; South Korea	Sümeyye Güleç; Germany
Finweight (−47 kg)	Belén Asensio; Spain	Yoo Eun-young; South Korea	Mandy Meloon; United States
Flyweight (−51 kg)	Wang Ying; China	Brigitte Yagüe; Spain	Nevena Lukic; Austria
Flyweight (−51 kg)	Wang Ying; China	Brigitte Yagüe; Spain	Daynellis Montejo; Cuba
Bantamweight (−55 kg)	Kim Bo-hye; South Korea	Zeynep Murat; Turkey	Orphée Ladouceur; Canada
Bantamweight (−55 kg)	Kim Bo-hye; South Korea	Zeynep Murat; Turkey	Eman Helmy; Egypt
Featherweight (−59 kg)	Diana López; United States	Kim Sae-rom; South Korea	Karine Sergerie; Canada
Featherweight (−59 kg)	Diana López; United States	Kim Sae-rom; South Korea	Bineta Diédhiou; Senegal
Lightweight (−63 kg)	Edna Díaz; Mexico	Su Li-wen; Chinese Taipei	Chonnapas Premwaew; Thailand
Lightweight (−63 kg)	Edna Díaz; Mexico	Su Li-wen; Chinese Taipei	Carmen Marton; Australia
Welterweight (−67 kg)	Hwang Kyung-seon; South Korea	Gwladys Épangue; France	Ibone Lallana; Spain
Welterweight (−67 kg)	Hwang Kyung-seon; South Korea	Gwladys Épangue; France	Sandra Šarić; Croatia
Middleweight (−72 kg)	Natália Falavigna; Brazil	Sarah Stevenson; Great Britain	Aitziber Los Arcos; Spain
Middleweight (−72 kg)	Natália Falavigna; Brazil	Sarah Stevenson; Great Britain	Jung Sun-young; South Korea
Heavyweight (+72 kg)	Sin Kyung-hyen; South Korea	Ineabelle Díaz; Puerto Rico	Laurence Rase; Belgium
Heavyweight (+72 kg)	Sin Kyung-hyen; South Korea	Ineabelle Díaz; Puerto Rico	Liu Rui; China

== Team ranking ==
South Korea won both men’s and women’s team titles at the 2005 WTF World Taekwondo Championships.

=== Men ===
Rank	Team
1	South Korea
2	Iran
3	Spain
4	United States
5	Russia

=== Women ===
Rank	Team
1	South Korea
2	Spain
3	China
4	United States
5	Mexico
