= 1989 World Taekwondo Championships =

Taekwondo competition

- Venue: Jamsil Arena
- Location: Seoul, South Korea
- Dates: 9–14 October 1989

Champions
- Men: South Korea
- Women: South Korea

The 1989 World Taekwondo Championships were the 9th edition of the World Taekwondo Championships, and were held in Seoul, South Korea from October 9 to October 14, 1989, with 446 athletes participating from 59 countries.

== Medal summary ==
=== Men ===
Event	Gold	Silver	Bronze
Finweight (−50 kg)	Kwon Tae-ho; South Korea	Chang Jung-san; Chinese Taipei	Juan Moreno; United States
Finweight (−50 kg)	Kwon Tae-ho; South Korea	Chang Jung-san; Chinese Taipei	Harun Ateş; Turkey
Flyweight (−54 kg)	Kim Cheol-ho; South Korea	Turgut Uçan; Turkey	Fariborz Danesh; Iran
Flyweight (−54 kg)	Kim Cheol-ho; South Korea	Turgut Uçan; Turkey	Salb Abdelhamid; Egypt
Bantamweight (−58 kg)	Ham Jun; South Korea	Domenico D'Alise; Italy	Christian Herberth; West Germany
Bantamweight (−58 kg)	Ham Jun; South Korea	Domenico D'Alise; Italy	Abdullah Al-Najrani; Saudi Arabia
Featherweight (−64 kg)	Jang Hyuk; South Korea	Hubert Sinègre; France	Musa Çiçek; West Germany
Featherweight (−64 kg)	Jang Hyuk; South Korea	Hubert Sinègre; France	Dhanaraj Rassiah; Malaysia
Lightweight (−70 kg)	Yang Dae-seung; South Korea	Nusret Ramazanoğlu; Turkey	Jae Hoon Lee; Canada
Lightweight (−70 kg)	Yang Dae-seung; South Korea	Nusret Ramazanoğlu; Turkey	José Rocamora; France
Welterweight (−76 kg)	Lee Hyun-suk; South Korea	Humberto Norambuena; Chile	Dante Pena; Philippines
Welterweight (−76 kg)	Lee Hyun-suk; South Korea	Humberto Norambuena; Chile	Khaled Fawzy; Egypt
Middleweight (−83 kg)	Jeong Yong-suk; South Korea	Renzo Zenteno; Chile	Hassan Zahedi; Iran
Middleweight (−83 kg)	Jeong Yong-suk; South Korea	Renzo Zenteno; Chile	Jarl Kaila; Finland
Heavyweight (+83 kg)	Amr Khairy; Egypt	Choi Sang-jin; South Korea	Victor Bateman; Australia
Heavyweight (+83 kg)	Amr Khairy; Egypt	Choi Sang-jin; South Korea	Farzad Zarakhsh; Iran

=== Women ===
Event	Gold	Silver	Bronze
Finweight (−43 kg)	Chin Yu-fang; Chinese Taipei	Mónica Torres; Mexico	Kim Jee-hyang; South Korea
Finweight (−43 kg)	Chin Yu-fang; Chinese Taipei	Mónica Torres; Mexico	Sita Kumari Rai; Nepal
Flyweight (−47 kg)	Won Sun-jin; South Korea	Pai Yun-yao; Chinese Taipei	Anita Falieros; Australia
Flyweight (−47 kg)	Won Sun-jin; South Korea	Pai Yun-yao; Chinese Taipei	Mayumi Pejo; United States
Bantamweight (−51 kg)	Jung Nam-suk; South Korea	Diane Murray; United States	Chen Yi-an; Chinese Taipei
Bantamweight (−51 kg)	Jung Nam-suk; South Korea	Diane Murray; United States	Ayşın Haktanır; Turkey
Featherweight (−55 kg)	Kim So-young; South Korea	Kim Dotson; United States	Patricia Mariscal; Mexico
Featherweight (−55 kg)	Kim So-young; South Korea	Kim Dotson; United States	Raquel Palacios; Spain
Lightweight (−60 kg)	Lee Eun-young; South Korea	Liu Chao-ching; Chinese Taipei	Elena Benítez; Spain
Lightweight (−60 kg)	Lee Eun-young; South Korea	Liu Chao-ching; Chinese Taipei	Şeyda Şerefoğlu; Turkey
Welterweight (−65 kg)	Anita Silsby; United States	Anne-Mieke Buijs; Netherlands	Ayşe Alkaya; Turkey
Welterweight (−65 kg)	Anita Silsby; United States	Anne-Mieke Buijs; Netherlands	Kim Ji-sook; South Korea
Middleweight (−70 kg)	Lydia Zele; United States	Marcia King; Canada	Antonia Vega; Spain
Middleweight (−70 kg)	Lydia Zele; United States	Marcia King; Canada	Hsu Ju-ya; Chinese Taipei
Heavyweight (+70 kg)	Jung Wan-sook; South Korea	Yvonne Franssen; Canada	Chun Yang-hsi; Chinese Taipei
Heavyweight (+70 kg)	Jung Wan-sook; South Korea	Yvonne Franssen; Canada	Yolanda Santana; Spain

== Medal table ==
Rank	Nation	Gold	Silver	Bronze	Total
1	South Korea	12	1	2	15
2	United States	2	2	2	6
3	Chinese Taipei	1	3	3	7
4	Egypt	1	0	2	3
5	Turkey	0	2	4	6
6	Canada	0	2	1	3
7	Chile	0	2	0	2
8	France	0	1	1	2
8	Mexico	0	1	1	2
10	Italy	0	1	0	1
10	Netherlands	0	1	0	1
12	Spain	0	0	4	4
13	Iran	0	0	3	3
14	Australia	0	0	2	2
14	West Germany	0	0	2	2
16	Finland	0	0	1	1
16	Malaysia	0	0	1	1
16	Nepal	0	0	1	1
16	Philippines	0	0	1	1
16	Saudi Arabia	0	0	1	1
Totals (20 entries)		16	16	32	64
