= Choi Yeon-ho =

South Korean taekwondo practitioner

Medal record

Representing South Korea

Men's taekwondo

World Junior Championships
Gold medal – first place	1998 Istanbul	Flyweight

World Championships
Gold medal – first place	2001 Jeju	Finweight
Gold medal – first place	2003 Garmisch-Partenkirchen	Finweight
Gold medal – first place	2007 Beijing	Finweight
Gold medal – first place	2009 Copenhagen	Finweight

World Cup
Gold medal – first place	2006 Bangkok	Flyweight

Asian Championships
Gold medal – first place	2004 Seognam	Finweight
Silver medal – second place	2008 Henan	Finweight

Choi Yeon-Ho (born May 4, 1981) is a South Korean taekwondo practitioner.

He is a four-time world finweight (-54 kg) champion, and won gold in flyweight (-58 kg) at the 2006 World Cup Taekwondo. However, he has not participated in any Olympics yet, since South Korea does not send an athlete in the -58 kg class.
