= 1977 World Taekwondo Championships =

Taekwondo competition

- Venue: International Amphitheatre
- Location: Chicago, United States
- Dates: 15–17 September 1977

Champions
- Men: South Korea

The 1977 World Taekwondo Championships are the 3rd edition of the World Taekwondo Championships, and were held in Chicago, United States from September 15 to September 17, 1977. A total of 720 athletes and officials from 46 nations took part in the championships.

== Medal summary ==
Event	Gold	Silver	Bronze
Finweight (−48 kg)	Song Ki-yul; South Korea	Jaime de Pablos; Mexico	Sheu Jiom-shi; Republic of China
Finweight (−48 kg)	Song Ki-yul; South Korea	Jaime de Pablos; Mexico	Turgay Ertuğrul; West Germany
Flyweight (−53 kg)	Ha Suk-kwang; South Korea	Jorge Ramírez; Ecuador	Moritz Von Nacher; Mexico
Flyweight (−53 kg)	Ha Suk-kwang; South Korea	Jorge Ramírez; Ecuador	Francisco García; Spain
Bantamweight (−58 kg)	Kim Yong-ki; South Korea	Hour Waei-shing; Republic of China	Helmut Stoppe; West Germany
Bantamweight (−58 kg)	Kim Yong-ki; South Korea	Hour Waei-shing; Republic of China	Reynaldo Salazar; Mexico
Featherweight (−63 kg)	Park Chung-ho; South Korea	Greg Fears; United States	Peter Salm; Netherlands
Featherweight (−63 kg)	Park Chung-ho; South Korea	Greg Fears; United States	Frédéric Kouassi; Ivory Coast
Lightweight (−68 kg)	Hwang Ming-der; Republic of China	Choi Jae-chun; South Korea	Ernie Reyes; United States
Lightweight (−68 kg)	Hwang Ming-der; Republic of China	Choi Jae-chun; South Korea	Eduardo Merchán; Spain
Welterweight (−73 kg)	Yoo Yong-hap; South Korea	Théophile Dossou; Ivory Coast	Manuel Jurado; Mexico
Welterweight (−73 kg)	Yoo Yong-hap; South Korea	Théophile Dossou; Ivory Coast	Rainer Müller; West Germany
Middleweight (−80 kg)	Hur Song; South Korea	James Kirby; United States	Manuel Salcedo; Spain
Middleweight (−80 kg)	Hur Song; South Korea	James Kirby; United States	Carlos Obregón; Mexico
Heavyweight (+80 kg)	Ahn Jang-shik; South Korea	Lin Ying-peng; Republic of China	Dirk Jung; West Germany
Heavyweight (+80 kg)	Ahn Jang-shik; South Korea	Lin Ying-peng; Republic of China	John Holloway; United States

== Medal table ==
Rank	Nation	Gold	Silver	Bronze	Total
1	South Korea	7	1	0	8
2	Republic of China	1	2	1	4
3	United States	0	2	2	4
4	Mexico	0	1	4	5
5	Ivory Coast	0	1	1	2
6	Ecuador	0	1	0	1
7	West Germany	0	0	4	4
8	Spain	0	0	3	3
9	Netherlands	0	0	1	1
Totals (9 entries)		8	8	16	32
