= Kim Joon-tae =

South korean taekwondo practitioner

Medal record

Men's taekwondo

Representing South Korea

World Championships
Gold medal – first place	2009 Copenhagen	Lightweight

Kim Joon-tae (Korean: 김준태) is a South Korean taekwondo practitioner.

In 2009, he finished in 1st place in the Korean trials for the World Championships and became a member of the South Korean national taekwondo team for the first time in his career. At the 2009 World Taekwondo Championships in Copenhagen, Denmark, Kim won the gold medal in the lightweight division (-74 kg). In the semifinal match, he beat 2005 world champion Mark López 7–5, landing three-point head kicks twice in Round 2.
