= Morteza Rostami =

Iranian taekwondo practitioner

Morteza Rostami (Persian: مرتضی رستمی; born January 28, 1980, in Iran) is an Iranian Taekwondo athlete who won a gold medal at the 2003 World Taekwondo Championships. On his way to victory, he defeated Zrouri Abdelkader in the first round, Lipatov Ruslan in the second, Montesinos Ruben (the 2005 world champion) in the third, Zhu Feng, Kuzmanovic Milorad in the next two rounds, and Asidah Zakaria in the final.
