= Park Kyung-suk (taekwondo) =

South Korean taekwondo practitioner

Personal information
- Nationality: South Korean

Sport
- Sport: Taekwondo
Medal record
Representing South Korea
Women's taekwondo
World Championships
Gold medal – first place	1995 Manila	Lightweight
Silver medal – second place	1993 New York City	Lightweight

Park Kyung-suk (Korean: 박경숙) is a South Korean taekwondo practitioner.

She won a silver medal in lightweight at the 1993 World Taekwondo Championships in New York City, and a gold medal at the 1995 World Taekwondo Championships in Manila.
