= Andreas Pilavakis (taekwondo) =

Cypriot taekwondo practitioner (born 1960)

Medal record

Men's taekwondo

Representing Cyprus

World Championships
Bronze medal – third place	1993 New York	Welterweight

Andreas Pilavakis (born 10 July 1960) is a retired Cypriot taekwondo athlete. He won a bronze medal in the men's welterweight class at the 1993 World Taekwondo Championships held in New York City. Pilavakis was the first taekwondo athlete from Cyprus to win a world championship medal.
