= Walter Dean Vargas =

Dean Vargas
Personal information
- Full name: Walter Dean Vargas
- Nationality: Filipino
- Occupation: Taekwondo trainer
- Weight: 58

Sport
- Country: Philippines
- Sport: Taekwondo
- Event: +58kg
Medal record
Representing Philippines
Men's taekwondo
Asian Championship
| Silver medal – second place | 1993 Kuala Lumpur | 58 kg |

Walter Dean Vargas (October 18, 1971) is a Filipino Olympic Taekwondo trainer and former Taekwondo representative having garnered third place in the men's 58 kilogram division. He won a bronze medal at the 1993 World Taekwondo Championships, and a silver medal at the 1994 Asian Taekwondo Championships.
