= Ali Tajik =

Iranian taekwondo practitioner

Ali Tajik (Persian: علی تاجیک; born 1 August 1976 in Iran) is a retired Iranian Taekwondo athlete who won a silver medal at the 2001 world Taekwondo cup and another silver medal at the 2005 World Taekwondo Championships. In the latter competition, he managed to reach the final and was only defeated by Steven Lopez, one of this sport's greatest champions.
