= Dae Sung Lee =

American martial artist

- Born: 1958 (age 67–68); Seoul, South Korea
- Style: Taekwondo
- Rank: 7th dan black belt

Other information
- Notable school: US Taekwondo Center Hawaii

- Dae Sung Lee
- Hangul: 이대성
- Hanja: 李大成
- RR: I Daeseong
- MR: I Taesŏng

Dae Sung Lee (born 1958) is a Korean-American master of taekwondo who holds the rank of 7th dan. Lee is a 10-time US national taekwondo team member and two-time Olympic coach. He served as taekwondo coach for the US Summer Olympic team in 1992.

== Early life ==
Lee was born in 1958 in Seoul, South Korea, and began studying taekwondo at the age of 11. He moved to Hawaii in 1971 with his family. Lee graduated from Moanalua High School in 1977 and obtained a bachelor's degree from the University of Hawaii at Manoa in 1987, double majoring in political science and physical education.

Lee considers masters Randy Kuk Do Chun of Honolulu and Sang Chul Lee of Colorado Springs as his main teachers. Both Chun and Lee came from the Jidokwan style of taekwondo.

== Competitive taekwondo career ==
Lee is a nine-time US National Champion (1979–1987), a 10-time US National Team Member (1979–1987, 1989), and has won medals at the World Taekwondo Championships, World Games, International Collegiate Taekwondo Championships, Pan American Games, and Pan American Taekwondo Championships. His competition record includes:

- 1989: US Taekwondo Team Trials (Fin): gold
- 1988: US Taekwondo Team Trials (Fin): silver
- 1987: World Taekwondo Championships (Fin): bronze; Pan American Games (Fin): gold; US Taekwondo Team Trials (Fin): gold; US Taekwondo National Championships (Fin): gold
- 1986: World Cup Taekwondo Championships (Fin): bronze; US Taekwondo National Championships (Fin): gold
- 1985: World Taekwondo Championships (Fin): silver; World Games Taekwondo (Fin): bronze; US Taekwondo National Championships (Fin): gold
- 1984: Pan American Taekwondo Championships (Fly): gold; US Taekwondo National Championships (Fly): gold
- 1983: International Collegiate Taekwondo Championships (Fin): gold; US Taekwondo National Championships (Fin): gold
- 1982: Pan American Taekwondo Championships (Fin): gold; World Taekwondo Championships (Fin): bronze; US Taekwondo National Championships (Fin): gold
- 1981: World Games Taekwondo (Fin): silver; US Taekwondo National Championships (Fin): gold
- 1980: AAU Tae Kwon Do National Championships (Fin): gold
- 1979: World Taekwondo Championships (Fin): bronze; US Taekwondo National Championships (Fin): gold
- 1977: US Taekwondo National Championships (Fly): bronze

== Coaching career ==
Lee served as an assistant taekwondo coach for the USA at the 1988 Summer Olympics and as taekwondo coach for the USA at the 1992 Summer Olympics. He was also head coach of the Colorado Springs Olympic Training Center's Resident Athlete Program for taekwondo from 1988–1993. Lee has operated the US Taekwondo Center in Aina Haina from 1993 to early 2000 and has trained over 10,000 students. In 2004, he was removed from the position of taekwondo coach for the USA team due to compete at the Summer Olympics in Athens.

Lee was also active in the United States Taekwondo Union (USTU), holding positions on the Athlete's Advisory Committee and serving as Chairman of the USTU's Tournament Committee and Junior Olympic Committee. He was a founding member of the United States Taekwondo Committee (USTC), which was created in August 2007, and had served as Secretary General of the organization. In 2007, Lee was approached by the Chinese Taekwondo Association to coach the Chinese Olympic Taekwondo Team for the 2008 Beijing Olympic Games. Lee accepted and relocated to Beijing, China, for the one year period leading up to the event. Lee served as the Chinese Team's Head Coach at the 2007 World Taekwondo Championships, the 2007 Korea Open Taekwondo Championships, the Good Luck Beijing 2008 International Taekwondo Invitational Tournament, and the 2008 Beijing Olympic Games. His international coaching record includes:

- 2008: Beijing Olympic Games; Good Luck Beijing 2008 International Taekwondo Invitational Tournament
- 2007: Korea Open Taekwondo Championships; World Taekwondo Championships
- 2003: World Taekwondo Championships; US Open Taekwondo Championships
- 2002: US Open Taekwondo Championships
- 2001: World Taekwondo Championships; US Open Taekwondo Championships
- 2000: US Open Taekwondo Championships
- 1999: World Olympic Qualification Tournament; World Taekwondo Championships; US Open Taekwondo Championships
- 1998: US Open Taekwondo Championships
- 1997: World Taekwondo Championships; US Open Taekwondo Championships
- 1996: US Open Taekwondo Championships
- 1995: World Taekwondo Championships; US Open Taekwondo Championships
- 1994: US Open Taekwondo Championships
- 1993: World Taekwondo Championships; US Open Taekwondo Championships
- 1992: Barcelona Olympic Games; US Open Taekwondo Championships
- 1991: World Taekwondo Championships
- 1989: World Taekwondo Championships
- 1988: Seoul Olympic Games

On February 24, 2009, Lee was inducted into the Hawaii Sports Hall of Fame as a longtime contributor to taekwondo in Hawaii.

== Personal ==
Since 1993, Lee has been married to Heon Mi Lee, and they have two children: Nikita and Daven Lee.

== See also ==
- List of Korean Americans
