= 1973 World Taekwondo Championships =

Taekwondo competition

- Venue: Kukkiwon
- Location: Seoul, South Korea
- Dates: 25–27 May 1973

Champions
- Men: South Korea

The 1973 World Taekwondo Championships (Korean: 1973년 세계 태권도 선수권 대회) were the 1st edition of the World Taekwondo Championships, and were held in Seoul, South Korea at the Kukkiwon (국기원) from May 25 to May 27, 1973.

== Medal summary ==
Event	Gold	Silver	Bronze
Lightweight (−64 kg)	Lee Ki-hyung; South Korea	Armando Chavero; West Germany	Joe Hayes; United States
Lightweight (−64 kg)	Lee Ki-hyung; South Korea	Armando Chavero; West Germany	Georg Karrenberg; West Germany
Heavyweight (+64 kg)	Kim Jeong-tae; South Korea	Mike Warren; United States	Albert Cheeks; United States
Heavyweight (+64 kg)	Kim Jeong-tae; South Korea	Mike Warren; United States	Raymond Sell; United States

== Medal table ==
Rank	Nation	Gold	Silver	Bronze	Total
1	South Korea	2	0	0	2
2	United States	0	1	3	4
3	West Germany	0	1	1	2
Totals (3 entries)		2	2	4	8

== Participating nations ==
- Australia
- Brunei
- Canada
- El Salvador
- France
- Guatemala
- Hong Kong
- Ivory Coast
- Japan
- Khmer Republic
- Malaysia
- Mexico
- Philippines
- Singapore
- South Korea
- Taiwan
- Uganda
- United States
- West Germany
