= Lindsay Lawrence =

British taekwondo practitioner

- Style: Taekwondo
- Rank: 7th Dan

Lindsay Lawrence is a bronze medalist in the 1985 World Games in taekwondo.
