= World Taekwondo Championships =

Taekwondo competition

- Current event or competition: 2027 World Taekwondo Championships

Competition details
- Discipline: Taekwondo
- Type: Kyorugi, biennial
- Organiser: World Taekwondo (WT)

History
- First edition: 1973 in Seoul, South Korea
- Editions: 28 (2027)

The World Taekwondo Championship is held every two years by World Taekwondo. In addition to the kyorugi (full contact fighting) Championships, there are also Para World Championships as well as Poomsae and Para Poomsae Championships held every two years.

== Competitions ==
Year	Date	City and host country	Venue	Men's champion	Women's champion
1973	May 25–27	Seoul, South Korea	Kukkiwon	South Korea	
1975	August 28–31	Seoul, South Korea	Jangchung Arena	South Korea	
1977	September 15–17	Chicago, United States	International Amphitheatre	South Korea	
1979	October 26–28	Stuttgart, West Germany	Glaspalast Sindelfingen	South Korea	
1982	February 24–27	Guayaquil, Ecuador	Coliseo Cerrado	South Korea	
1983	October 20–23	Copenhagen, Denmark	Brøndbyhallen	South Korea	
1985	September 4–8	Seoul, South Korea	Jamsil Arena	South Korea	
1987	October 7–11	Barcelona, Spain	Palau dels Esports	South Korea	South Korea
1989	October 9–14	Seoul, South Korea	Jamsil Arena	South Korea	South Korea
1991	October 28 – November 3	Athens, Greece	Peace and Friendship Stadium	South Korea	South Korea
1993	August 19–23	New York City, United States	Madison Square Garden	South Korea	South Korea
1995	November 17–21	Manila, Philippines	Folk Arts Theater	South Korea	South Korea
1997	November 19–23	Hong Kong	Hong Kong Coliseum	South Korea	South Korea
1999	June 2–6	Edmonton, Canada	Universiade Pavilion	South Korea	South Korea
2001	November 1–7	Jeju, South Korea	Halla Gymnasium	South Korea	South Korea
2003	September 24–28	Garmisch-Partenkirchen, Germany	Olympia-Eissport-Zentrum	South Korea	South Korea
2005	April 13–17	Madrid, Spain	Palacio de Deportes	South Korea	South Korea
2007	May 18–22	Beijing, China	Changping Gymnasium	South Korea	South Korea
2009	October 14–18	Copenhagen, Denmark	Ballerup Super Arena	South Korea	China
2011	May 1–6	Gyeongju, South Korea	Gyeongju Indoor Stadium	Iran	South Korea
2013	July 15–21	Puebla, Mexico	Exhibition Center of Puebla	South Korea	South Korea
2015	May 12–18	Chelyabinsk, Russia	Traktor Ice Arena	Iran	South Korea
2017	June 24–30	Muju, South Korea	Taekwondowon	South Korea	South Korea
2019	May 15–19	Manchester, United Kingdom	Manchester Arena	South Korea	South Korea
2022	November 13–20	(Mexico) Guadalajara, Mexico^{1}	CODE Metropolitano	South Korea	Mexico
2023	May 29 – June 6	Baku, Azerbaijan	Baku Crystal Hall	South Korea	Turkey
2025	October 24–30	Wuxi, China	Wuxi Taihu International Expo Center	South Korea	Turkey
2027		Astana, Kazakhstan			

^{1} Wuxi, China, was originally selected to host the 2021 World Taekwondo Championships. Due to the impact of the Global COVID-19 pandemic, Wuxi gave up hosting the World Taekwondo Championship. In Early 2022, Guadalajara, Mexico was selected as a replacement host and the 2025 championship was scheduled to be held in Wuxi, instead.

== All-time medal table ==
Updated after the 2025 World Taekwondo Championships.

Rank	Nation	Gold	Silver	Bronze	Total
1	South Korea	178	37	39	254
2	Spain	23	29	69	121
3	Turkey	21	24	38	83
4	Chinese Taipei	16	29	40	85
5	Iran	16	22	28	66
6	United States	14	22	51	87
7	China	14	18	26	58
8	France	8	11	17	36
9	Great Britain	8	10	15	33
10	Mexico	7	32	37	76
11	Thailand	7	9	16	32
12	Croatia	5	6	22	33
13	Netherlands	4	5	16	25
14	Cuba	4	3	8	15
15	Serbia	4	2	6	12
16	Azerbaijan	4	1	12	17
17	Russia	3	13	18	34
18	Brazil	3	10	14	27
19	West Germany	3	8	19	30
20	Uzbekistan	3	8	7	18
21	Italy	3	6	16	25
22	Germany	3	4	16	23
23	Egypt	3	3	16	22
24	Hungary	3	1	3	7
25	Denmark	2	6	3	11
26	Ivory Coast	2	4	12	18
27	Tunisia	2	0	5	7
28	Belgium	2	0	3	5
29	Mali	2	0	2	4
30	Canada	1	11	14	26
31	Greece	1	5	11	17
–	Individual Neutral Athletes^{a}	1	4	7	12
32	Ecuador	1	2	1	4
33	Australia	1	1	19	21
34	Japan	1	1	6	8
35	World Taekwondo Federation^{b}	1	1	0	2
36	Gabon	1	0	2	3
37	Niger	1	0	0	1
38	Philippines	0	5	6	11
39	Jordan	0	3	8	11
40	Morocco	0	3	7	10
41	Puerto Rico	0	2	3	5
42	Afghanistan	0	2	2	4
43	Chile	0	2	1	3
44	Indonesia	0	2	0	2
45	Vietnam	0	1	5	6
46	Argentina	0	1	4	5
46	Venezuela	0	1	4	5
48	Israel	0	1	1	2
48	Portugal	0	1	1	2
48	Ukraine	0	1	1	2
51	Bahrain	0	1	0	1
51	Guam	0	1	0	1
51	South Africa	0	1	0	1
54	Kazakhstan	0	0	10	10
55	Sweden	0	0	7	7
56	Dominican Republic	0	0	6	6
57	Colombia	0	0	5	5
58	Belarus	0	0	4	4
58	Norway	0	0	4	4
58	Saudi Arabia	0	0	4	4
61	Austria	0	0	3	3
61	Senegal	0	0	3	3
61	Slovenia	0	0	3	3
61	Switzerland	0	0	3	3
65	Cyprus	0	0	2	2
65	Finland	0	0	2	2
65	Guatemala	0	0	2	2
65	Latvia	0	0	2	2
65	Malaysia	0	0	2	2
65	Moldova	0	0	2	2
65	Nepal	0	0	2	2
65	Nigeria	0	0	2	2
65	Poland	0	0	2	2
65	Serbia and Montenegro	0	0	2	2
75	Bulgaria	0	0	1	1
75	Costa Rica	0	0	1	1
75	Uganda	0	0	1	1
Totals (77 entries)		376	376	752	1,504

a At the 2023 and 2025 World Championships, athletes from Russia and Belarus in accordance with sanctions imposed following by the 2022 Russian invasion of Ukraine participated as Individual Neutral Athletes (AIN), their medals were not included in the official medal table.
b At the 2015 World Championships, athletes from Belgium competed as World Taekwondo Federation (WTF) due to the suspension of the country's Taekwondo Federation.

== Multiple gold medalists ==
The tables shows those who have won at least 3 gold medals at the World Championships. Boldface denotes active taekwondo practitioners and highest medal count among all taekwondo practitioners (including these who not included in these tables) per type.

=== Men ===
Rank	Taekwondo practitioner	Country	Weights	From	To	Gold	Silver	Bronze	Total
1	Steven López	United States	72 kg / 78 kg / 80 kg	2001	2009	**5**	–	–	**5**
2	Choi Yeon-ho	South Korea	54 kg	2001	2009	4	–	–	4
2	Jeong Kook-hyun	South Korea	73 kg / 76 kg	1982	1987	4	–	–	4
4	Bahri Tanrıkulu	Turkey	78 kg / 84 kg / 87 kg	1999	2009	3	1	1	**5**
5	Lee Dae-hoon	South Korea	63 kg / 68 kg	2011	2019	3	–	1	4
6	Jin Seung-tae	South Korea	50 kg / 54 kg	1993	1997	3	–	–	3
6	Kim Je-kyoung	South Korea	+83 kg	1993	1997	3	–	–	3
6	Kim Tae-hun	South Korea	54 kg	2013	2017	3	–	–	3
6	Kim Yong-ki	South Korea	58 kg / 56 kg	1977	1982	3	–	–	3
6	Yang Dae-seung	South Korea	70 kg	1987	1991	3	–	–	3

=== Women ===
Rank	Taekwondo practitioner	Country	Weights	From	To	Gold	Silver	Bronze	Total
1	Brigitte Yagüe	Spain	51 kg / 47 kg / 49 kg	2001	2011	**3**	2	1	**6**
2	Cho Hyang-mi	South Korea	65 kg / 63 kg	1991	1999	**3**	–	1	4
2	**Bianca Cook (Walkden)**	Great Britain	+73 kg	2015	2023	**3**	–	1	4
4	Jung Myoung-sook	South Korea	+70 kg	1993	1997	**3**	–	–	3

== World Poomsae Championships ==
Year	Date	City and host country
2014	October 30 – November 2	Aguascalientes, Mexico
2016	September 29 – October 2	Lima, Peru
2018	November 15 – 18	(Chinese Taipei) Taipei, Taiwan
2020	November 15 – December 15	(South Korea) online*
2022	April 21 – 24	Goyang, South Korea
2024	November 30 – December 4	Hong Kong, China
2026	September 16 – 20	Chuncheon, South Korea

* The 2020 World Poomsae Championships were held online due to the COVID-19 pandemic. The event was originally meant to be held in May in Herning, Denmark.

== See also ==
- World Cup Taekwondo Team Championships
- World Juniors Taekwondo Championships
- World Cadet Taekwondo Championships
