= 2019 World Taekwondo Championships – Men's welterweight =

Men's welterweight at the 2019 World Championships
- Venue: Manchester Arena
- Dates: 18–19 May 2019
- Competitors: 62 from 62 nations

Medalists
gold medal	Milad Beigi	Azerbaijan
silver medal	Apostolos Telikostoglou	Greece
bronze medal	Moisés Hernández	Dominican Republic
bronze medal	Park Woo-hyeok	South Korea

The men's welterweight is a competition featured at the 2019 World Taekwondo Championships, and was held at the Manchester Arena in Manchester, United Kingdom on 18 and 19 May. Welterweights were limited to a maximum of 80 kilograms in body mass.

== Results ==
Legend

- DQ — Won by disqualification
- P — Won by punitive declaration
- R — Won by referee stop contest
- W — Won by withdrawal

=== Finals ===
Semifinals		Final
Moisés Hernández (DOM)	7
Apostolos Telikostoglou (GRE)	15	Apostolos Telikostoglou (GRE)	12
Park Woo-hyeok (KOR)	20	Milad Beigi (AZE)	22
Milad Beigi (AZE)	37

=== Top half ===
==== Section 1 ====
Round of 64
Faysal Sawadogo (BUR)	10
João Pedro Chaves (BRA)	13
Nurlan Myrzabayev (KAZ)	26
Jonatan Rodríguez (URU)	9
Ivan Paulouski (BLR)	5
Liu Wei-ting (TPE)	16
Saleh El-Sharabaty (JOR)	29^{P}
Rayan Delbani (LBN)	11
Denys Voronovskyi (UKR)	10
Karol Hołubowicz (POL)	17
Christopher Iliesco (CAN)	15
Samuel Morrison (PHI)	19
Ermin Trncic (SWE)	7
Moisés Hernández (DOM)	16

Round of 32
Cheick Sallah Cissé (CIV)	17
João Pedro Chaves (BRA)	9
Nurlan Myrzabayev (KAZ)	11
Liu Wei-ting (TPE)	28
Saleh El-Sharabaty (JOR)	25
Karol Hołubowicz (POL)	15
Samuel Morrison (PHI)	4
Moisés Hernández (DOM)	21

Round of 16
Cheick Sallah Cissé (CIV)	12
Liu Wei-ting (TPE)	7^{R}
Saleh El-Sharabaty (JOR)	14
Moisés Hernández (DOM)	22

Quarterfinals
Liu Wei-ting (TPE)
Moisés Hernández (DOM)	W

==== Section 2 ====
Round of 64
Richard Ordemann (NOR)	20
David Robleto (NCA)	0
~~Ababacar Sadikh Soumaré (SEN)~~
Yordan Kolev (BUL)	DQ
Aleksandar Radojkovic (AUT)	2
Jorge González (AND)	7
Georgios Kakouris (CYP)	0
Apostolos Telikostoglou (GRE)	23
Roberto Botta (ITA)	13
Neyder Lozano (COL)	12
David Šimek (CZE)	9
Elvis Barbosa (PUR)	22
Ali Al-Araimi (QAT)	9
Patrik Divkovič (SLO)	15
Kasun Jayathilaka (SRI)	4
Damon Sansum (GBR)	44

Round of 32
Richard Ordemann (NOR)	13
Yordan Kolev (BUL)	2
Jorge González (AND)	1
Apostolos Telikostoglou (GRE)	21
Roberto Botta (ITA)	16
Elvis Barbosa (PUR)	2
Patrik Divkovič (SLO)	7
Damon Sansum (GBR)	8

Round of 16
Richard Ordemann (NOR)	6
Apostolos Telikostoglou (GRE)	11
Roberto Botta (ITA)	13
Damon Sansum (GBR)	12

Quarterfinals
Apostolos Telikostoglou (GRE)	13
Roberto Botta (ITA)	12

=== Bottom half ===
==== Section 3 ====
Round of 64
Maksim Khramtsov (RUS)	35
Nawaf Al-Hajri (KUW)	7
Hidenori Ebata (JPN)	16
Park Woo-hyeok (KOR)	32
Jaysen Ishida (USA)	22
Hama Alzouma (NIG)	10
Karlo Galić (BIH)	1
Chen Linglong (CHN)	23
Tahir Güleç (GER)	21
Isiah Pollard (TTO)	1
Mehran Barkhordari (IRI)	22
Uriel Adriano (MEX)	13
Michel Fernandes (POR)	20
Oleksandr Filippov (ISR)	9
Nischal Man Shrestha (NEP)	3
Raúl Martínez (ESP)	16^{P}

Round of 32
Maksim Khramtsov (RUS)	18
Park Woo-hyeok (KOR)	22
Jaysen Ishida (USA)	5
Chen Linglong (CHN)	7
Tahir Güleç (GER)	29
Mehran Barkhordari (IRI)	16
Michel Fernandes (POR)	5
Raúl Martínez (ESP)	16

Round of 16
Park Woo-hyeok (KOR)	21
Chen Linglong (CHN)	2
Tahir Güleç (GER)	11
Raúl Martínez (ESP)	12

Quarterfinals
Park Woo-hyeok (KOR)	23
Raúl Martínez (ESP)	8

==== Section 4 ====
Round of 64
Aaron Cook (MDA)	35
Md Masum Khan (BAN)	3
Achraf Mahboubi (MAR)	12
Ivan Karajlović (SRB)	11
Nicholas Corten (BEL)	3
Shukhrat Salaev (UZB)	3
Hendrix Dorilas (FGT)	2
Yunus Sarı (TUR)	22
Luka Horvat (CRO)	28
Rab Nawaz (PAK)	7
Max Watene (NZL)	5
Ismaël Bouzid (FRA)	27
José Cobas (CUB)	13
David Sajko (SVK)	10

Round of 32
Aaron Cook (MDA)	26
Achraf Mahboubi (MAR)	22
Nicholas Corten (BEL)	7
Yunus Sarı (TUR)	6
Luka Horvat (CRO)	6
Ismaël Bouzid (FRA)	13
José Cobas (CUB)	4
Milad Beigi (AZE)	17

Round of 16
Aaron Cook (MDA)	15
Nicholas Corten (BEL)	7
Ismaël Bouzid (FRA)	4
Milad Beigi (AZE)	19

Quarterfinals
Aaron Cook (MDA)	26
Milad Beigi (AZE)	40
