= 2017 World Taekwondo Championships – Men's welterweight =

Taekwondo competition

Men's welterweight at the 2017 World Championships
- Venue: Taekwondowon
- Dates: 30 June 2017
- Competitors: 68 from 68 nations

Medalists
gold medal	Milad Beigi	Azerbaijan
silver medal	Anton Kotkov	Russia
bronze medal	Damon Sansum	Great Britain
bronze medal	Aaron Cook	Moldova

The men's welterweight is a competition featured at the 2017 World Taekwondo Championships, and was held at the Taekwondowon in Muju County, South Korea on June 30. Welterweights were limited to a maximum of 80 kilograms in body mass.

== Results ==
Legend

- DQ — Won by disqualification
- P — Won by punitive declaration
- R — Won by referee stop contest

=== Finals ===
Quarterfinals		Semifinals		Final
Nurlan Myrzabayev (KAZ)	8
Damon Sansum (GBR)	21	Damon Sansum (GBR)	5
Richard Ordemann (NOR)	6	Anton Kotkov (RUS)	7
Anton Kotkov (RUS)	8			Anton Kotkov (RUS)	3
Aaron Cook (MDA)	24			Milad Beigi (AZE)	21
Qiao Sen (CHN)	23	Aaron Cook (MDA)	5
Moisés Hernández (DOM)	10	Milad Beigi (AZE)	41^{P}
Milad Beigi (AZE)	19

=== Top half ===
==== Section 1 ====
Round of 128
Abdulaziz Abi (SYR)	27
Imtiaz Ibne Ali (BAN)	13^{P}

Round of 64
Cheick Sallah Cissé (CIV)	38^{R}
Imtiaz Ibne Ali (BAN)	0
Nurlan Myrzabayev (KAZ)	20
Ghassan Moufarrej (AUS)	6
Maksim Rafalovich (UZB)	22
Tarek Mousalli (LBN)	2
Majed Al-Mabruk (KSA)	4
Luka Horvat (CRO)	25

Round of 32
Cheick Sallah Cissé (CIV)	13
Nurlan Myrzabayev (KAZ)	23
Maksim Rafalovich (UZB)	14
Luka Horvat (CRO)	1

Round of 16
Nurlan Myrzabayev (KAZ)	17
Maksim Rafalovich (UZB)	14

==== Section 2 ====
Round of 128

Round of 64
Damon Sansum (GBR)	24^{P}
Ameerul Solehen Kassim (BRU)	9
~~Joe Kayumba (COD)~~
Aleksandar Radojkovic (AUT)	DQ
Elías Robles (CHI)	10^{P}
Miguel Ferrera (HON)	7
Paul Kolade (NGR)	12
Piotr Paziński (POL)	19

Round of 32
Damon Sansum (GBR)	21
Aleksandar Radojkovic (AUT)	18
Elías Robles (CHI)	13
Piotr Paziński (POL)	22

Round of 16
Damon Sansum (GBR)	32
Piotr Paziński (POL)	21

==== Section 3 ====
Round of 128

Round of 64
Yunus Sarı (TUR)	11^{R}
Rodny Mondelus (HAI)	2
Yordan Kolev (BUL)	8
Apostolos Telikostoglou (GRE)	10
Michel Fernandes (POR)	21
Giavero Sabajo (SUR)	18
Kristmundur Gíslason (ISL)	4
Richard Ordemann (NOR)	11

Round of 32
Yunus Sarı (TUR)	18
Apostolos Telikostoglou (GRE)	8
Michel Fernandes (POR)	11
Richard Ordemann (NOR)	15

Round of 16
Yunus Sarı (TUR)	2
Richard Ordemann (NOR)	6^{R}

==== Section 4 ====
Round of 128
El-Hadji Diallo Sow (SEN)	31^{R}
Youssouf Egueh Daher (DJI)	3

Round of 64
Anton Kotkov (RUS)	DQ
~~Isiah Pollard (TTO)~~
Pouria Erfanian (IRI)	21
Elvis Barbosa (PUR)	5
Christian dela Cruz (PHI)	24
Danylo Yeremenko (UKR)	15
El-Hadji Diallo Sow (SEN)	8
Park Yong-hyun (KOR)	28

Round of 32
Anton Kotkov (RUS)	20
Pouria Erfanian (IRI)	14
Christian dela Cruz (PHI)	8
Park Yong-hyun (KOR)	10

Round of 16
Anton Kotkov (RUS)	10
Park Yong-hyun (KOR)	5

=== Bottom half ===
==== Section 5 ====
Round of 128
~~Abdelmalek Bendaikha (ALG)~~
Mohamed Kouma (MLI)	DQ

Round of 64
Aaron Cook (MDA)	37
Mohamed Kouma (MLI)	5
Maxime Potvin (CAN)	20
Jordan Maikoouva (FRA)	22
Ivan Karajlović (SRB)	R
Navjeet Maan (IND)
Daniel Timoteo (LUX)	5
Liu Wei-ting (TPE)	16

Round of 32
Aaron Cook (MDA)	16
Jordan Maikoouva (FRA)	14
Ivan Karajlović (SRB)	5
Liu Wei-ting (TPE)	14

Round of 16
Aaron Cook (MDA)	21
Liu Wei-ting (TPE)	18

==== Section 6 ====
Round of 128

Round of 64
Steven López (USA)	R
Mario Ferreira (MOZ)
Andrés Beceiro (MEX)	16
Qiao Sen (CHN)	26^{P}
José Cobas (CUB)	25
Ali Al-Araimi (QAT)	16
Asim Boulogne (LCA)
Oussama Oueslati (TUN)	R

Round of 32
Steven López (USA)	14
Qiao Sen (CHN)	22
José Cobas (CUB)	27
Oussama Oueslati (TUN)	18^{P}

Round of 16
Qiao Sen (CHN)	27
Oussama Oueslati (TUN)	15

==== Section 7 ====
Round of 128

Round of 64
Tahir Güleç (GER)	26
Remuela Tinirau (FPO)	3
Salaheldin Khairy (EGY)	12
Uladzislau Saulukou (BLR)	16
João Pedro Chaves (BRA)	23
Oleksandr Filippov (ISR)	25
Sioota Makolo Pole (TUV)
Moisés Hernández (DOM)	R

Round of 32
Tahir Güleç (GER)	11
Uladzislau Saulukou (BLR)	13
Oleksandr Filippov (ISR)	7
Moisés Hernández (DOM)	22

Round of 16
Uladzislau Saulukou (BLR)	5
Moisés Hernández (DOM)	6

==== Section 8 ====
Round of 128
Damien Taylor (BAR)	7
Djibo Kadri Bagna (NIG)	28

Round of 64
Roberto Botta (ITA)	13
Niklas Kovacevic (SWE)	5
Yasir Ahmed Al-Haj (SUD)	4
Raúl Martínez (ESP)	25
David Sajko (SVK)	8
Hidenori Ebata (JPN)	13^{P}
Djibo Kadri Bagna (NIG)	9
Milad Beigi (AZE)	30

Round of 32
Roberto Botta (ITA)	13
Raúl Martínez (ESP)	19
Hidenori Ebata (JPN)	7
Milad Beigi (AZE)	18^{P}

Round of 16
Raúl Martínez (ESP)	13
Milad Beigi (AZE)	19
