= 2025 World Taekwondo Championships – Men's middleweight =

Taekwondo competitions

Men's middleweight at the 2025 World Championships
- Venue: Taihu International Expo Center
- Dates: 26 October 2025
- Competitors: 46 from 41 nations

Medalists
gold medal	Seif Eissa	Egypt
silver medal	Simone Alessio	Italy
bronze medal	Szymon Piątkowski	Poland
bronze medal	Artem Harbar	Ukraine

The men's middleweight competition at the 2025 World Taekwondo Championships was held on 26 October 2025 in Wuxi, China. Middleweights were limited to a maximum of 87 kilograms in body mass.

== Results ==
=== Finals ===
Semifinals			Final
Seif Eissa (EGY)	0	4
Szymon Piątkowski (POL)	0	3	Seif Eissa (EGY)	5	2	2
Simone Alessio (ITA)	1	5	Simone Alessio (ITA)	2	3	1
Artem Harbar (UKR)	1	4

=== Top half ===
==== Section 1 ====
Round of 64
Mederic Angaman (CIV)	8	8
Andreas Theocharous (CYP)	5	5
Yamen Faraj (LBN)	0	0
Nurlan Myrzabayev (KAZ)	12	9
Stefan Stojanović (SRB)	3	4
Moisés Hernández (DOM)	6	10

Round of 32
Seif Eissa (EGY)	0	3
Mederic Angaman (CIV)	0	1
Orkun Ateşli (TUR)	11	14
Vasileios Tholiotis (GRE)	11	9
Shukhrat Salaev (UZB)	1	8
Nurlan Myrzabayev (KAZ)	0	8
Moisés Hernández (DOM)	4	6	5
Michael Rodriguez (USA)	6	4	0

Round of 16
Seif Eissa (EGY)	6	5
Orkun Ateşli (TUR)	0	5
Shukhrat Salaev (UZB)	11	10
Moisés Hernández (DOM)	1	4

Quarterfinals
Seif Eissa (EGY)	2	8	2
Shukhrat Salaev (UZB)	6	4	2

==== Section 2 ====
Round of 64
Mohammad Mokhtari (TRT)	6	0
Chen Liang-hsi (TPE)	8	5
Josip Bilić Pavlinović (CRO)	2	2
Farzad Mansouri (TRT)	11	2
Mohammad Hesam Hamedi (TRT)	3	3
Saleh El-Sharabaty (JOR)	15	14
Diego Alejandro-Vargas (PUR)	13	13	16
Ashraf Shukran (AFG)	16	6	8

Round of 32
Szymon Piątkowski (POL)	8	1	8
Chen Liang-hsi (TPE)	0	2	8
Farzad Mansouri (TRT)	10	9
Kelen Bailey (HUN)	6	4
Sergio Troitiño (ESP)	10	6
Saleh El-Sharabaty (JOR)	23	12
Diego Alejandro-Vargas (PUR)	0	5
Liu Zhaoyang (CHN)	2	5

Round of 16
Szymon Piątkowski (POL)	6	0
Farzad Mansouri (TRT)	4	0
Saleh El-Sharabaty (JOR)	7	8
Liu Zhaoyang (CHN)	1	6

Quarterfinals
Szymon Piątkowski (POL)	3	8
Saleh El-Sharabaty (JOR)	3	8

=== Bottom half ===
==== Section 3 ====
Round of 64
Daniil Yurkou (AIN)	5	8
Hassan Amer Ali (DEN)	1	7
Óscar Navarro (MEX)	5	4
Daniel Dasent-Thomson (TTO)	4	0
Park Woo-hyeok (KOR)	7	7	2
Hidenori Ebata (JPN)	10	0	0
Youssouf Soumano (MLI)	7	7
Khouyyar Zakaria (MAR)	10	12

Round of 32
Simone Alessio (ITA)	12	6
Daniil Yurkou (AIN)	5	3
Óscar Navarro (MEX)	0	1
Motaz Ifaoui (TUN)	10	9
Mohammad Hossein Yazdani (IRI)	10	5	5
Park Woo-hyeok (KOR)	4	8	4
Khouyyar Zakaria (MAR)	8	7
Jordan Stewart (CAN)	0	4

Round of 16
Simone Alessio (ITA)	4	5
Motaz Ifaoui (TUN)	2	5
Mohammad Hossein Yazdani (IRI)	9	10
Khouyyar Zakaria (MAR)	2	3

Quarterfinals
Simone Alessio (ITA)	11	2	7
Mohammad Hossein Yazdani (IRI)	1	4	4

==== Section 4 ====
Round of 64
Ossanando Naufal Khairudin (INA)	2	2
Rafael Kamalov (AIN)	10	3
Ali Al-Khaibari (KSA)	3	5	5
Rishabh Chaudhary (IND)	4	0	6
Jobe Stewart (AUS)	16	11
Tiago Ribeiro (POR)	4	2

Round of 32
Richard Ordemann (NOR)	2	8	7
Rafael Kamalov (AIN)	2	0	8
Rishabh Chaudhary (IND)	3	5
Ícaro Miguel Soares (BRA)	4	9
Erol Nući (BIH)	2	0
Eltaj Gafarov (AZE)	5	2
Jobe Stewart (AUS)	0	2
Artem Harbar (UKR)	12	15

Round of 16
Rafael Kamalov (AIN)	6	1	2
Ícaro Miguel Soares (BRA)	5	2	6
Eltaj Gafarov (AZE)	1	3
Artem Harbar (UKR)	6	9

Quarterfinals
Ícaro Miguel Soares (BRA)	0	6	1
Artem Harbar (UKR)	3	5	11
