= 2013 World Taekwondo Championships – Men's welterweight =

Taekwondo competition

Men's welterweight at the 2013 World Championships
- Venue: Exhibition Center of Puebla
- Dates: 21 July 2013
- Competitors: 57 from 56 nations

Medalists
gold medal	Tahir Güleç	Germany
silver medal	René Lizárraga	Mexico
bronze medal	Anton Kotkov	Russia
bronze medal	Nicolás García	Spain

The men's welterweight is a competition featured at the 2013 World Taekwondo Championships, and was held at the Exhibition Center of Puebla in Puebla, Mexico on July 21. Welterweights were limited to a minimum of 80 kilograms in body mass.

== Results ==
- DQ — Won by disqualification
- K — Won by knockout
- R — Won by referee stop contest

=== Finals ===
Semifinals		Final
Tahir Güleç (GER)	3
Anton Kotkov (RUS)	2	Tahir Güleç (GER)	8
Nicolás García (ESP)	5	René Lizárraga (MEX)	7
René Lizárraga (MEX)	6

=== Top half ===
==== Section 1 ====
Round of 64
Simone Cannellino (ITA)	5
João Pedro Chaves (BRA)	12
Azamat Tengizbayev (KAZ)	5
Carlos Rivas (VEN)	6
Miguel Ferrera (HON)	DQ
~~Sunday Onofe (NGR)~~
Lenn Hypolite (TTO)	12
Ravi Kadyan (WTF)	3
Chen Yen-ting (TPE)	3
Karim Shafiek (EGY)	4
Uladzislau Saulukou (BLR)	4
Ynoussa Sawadogo (FRA)	6
~~Farkhod Negmatov (TJK)~~
Tahir Güleç (GER)	DQ

Round of 32
Ramin Azizov (AZE)	10
João Pedro Chaves (BRA)	6
Carlos Rivas (VEN)	2
Miguel Ferrera (HON)	7
Lenn Hypolite (TTO)	5
Karim Shafiek (EGY)	4
Ynoussa Sawadogo (FRA)	2
Tahir Güleç (GER)	6

Round of 16
Ramin Azizov (AZE)	12
Miguel Ferrera (HON)	0
Lenn Hypolite (TTO)	3
Tahir Güleç (GER)	5

Quarterfinals
Ramin Azizov (AZE)	2
Tahir Güleç (GER)	3

==== Section 2 ====
Round of 64
Stojan Rabijac (SRB)	9
Eric Onen (UGA)	4
Sylvain Fostin (GDL)	4
Gregor Pirš (SLO)	5
Hao Chao (MAC)	3
Hayder Shkara (AUS)	1
Abdoulaye Gbané (CIV)	15
Ben Radjab (CHA)	1
Olivier April-Lalonde (CAN)	1
Anton Kotkov (RUS)	2
Maksim Rafalovich (UZB)	19
Damon Sansum (GBR)	22

Round of 32
Arman Yeremyan (ARM)	8
Stojan Rabijac (SRB)	1
Gregor Pirš (SLO)	12
Hao Chao (MAC)	4
Abdoulaye Gbané (CIV)	1
Anton Kotkov (RUS)	3
Damon Sansum (GBR)	7
Yunus Sarı (TUR)	4

Round of 16
Arman Yeremyan (ARM)	1
Gregor Pirš (SLO)	0
Anton Kotkov (RUS)	7
Damon Sansum (GBR)	6

Quarterfinals
Arman Yeremyan (ARM)	4
Anton Kotkov (RUS)	8^{R}

=== Bottom half ===
==== Section 3 ====
Round of 64
Emmanuel Mba (GAB)	1
Javier Quesada (CRC)	3
Craig Brown (JAM)	6^{K}
Christos Pilavakis (CYP)	1
Arber Bajra (BEL)	4
Christian dela Cruz (PHI)	8
Qiao Sen (CHN)	14
Fayçal Koussoubé (BUR)	2
Nikolaos Tzellos (GRE)	8
Fiston Lumu (COD)	1
Cho Yoo-jin (KOR)	12
Omid Amidi (IRI)	24

Round of 32
Nicolás García (ESP)	13
Javier Quesada (CRC)	4
Craig Brown (JAM)	12
Christian dela Cruz (PHI)	13
Qiao Sen (CHN)	8
Nikolaos Tzellos (GRE)	4
Omid Amidi (IRI)	11
Vaughn Scott (NZL)	8

Round of 16
Nicolás García (ESP)	6
Christian dela Cruz (PHI)	3
Qiao Sen (CHN)	10
Omid Amidi (IRI)	4

Quarterfinals
Nicolás García (ESP)	5
Qiao Sen (CHN)	1

==== Section 4 ====
Round of 64
Waldeck Defaix (FPO)	0
Steven López (USA)	13
Yousef Sanasyeri (KUW)	6
Michel Fernandes (POR)	5
Eric Nkurunziza (RWA)	1
Juan Sánchez (PUR)	3
René Lizárraga (MEX)	17
Deivis Escorcia (COL)	2
Mahmoud Abdelrahim (QAT)	15
Stuart Smit (ARU)	3
Maksym Dominishyn (UKR)	5
Piotr Paziński (POL)	7

Round of 32
Oussama Oueslati (TUN)	1
Steven López (USA)	7
Yousef Sanasyeri (KUW)	3
Juan Sánchez (PUR)	13
René Lizárraga (MEX)	12
Mahmoud Abdelrahim (QAT)	7
Piotr Paziński (POL)	13
Aaron Cook (IMN)	11

Round of 16
Steven López (USA)	4
Juan Sánchez (PUR)	1
René Lizárraga (MEX)	7
Piotr Paziński (POL)	6

Quarterfinals
Steven López (USA)	5
René Lizárraga (MEX)	8
