= 2015 World Taekwondo Championships – Men's welterweight =

Taekwondo competition

Men's welterweight at the 2015 World Championships
- Venue: Traktor Ice Arena
- Dates: 18 May 2015
- Competitors: 60 from 60 nations

Medalists
| gold medal | Mehdi Khodabakhshi | Iran |
| silver medal | Damon Sansum | Great Britain |
| bronze medal | Aaron Cook | Moldova |
| bronze medal | Tahir Güleç | Germany |

The men's welterweight is a competition featured at the 2015 World Taekwondo Championships, and was held at the Traktor Ice Arena in Chelyabinsk, Russia on May 18. Welterweights were limited to a minimum of 80 kilograms in body mass.

== Results ==
Legend

- DQ — Won by disqualification
- P — Won by punitive declaration

=== Finals ===
| Semifinals | | Final |
| Aaron Cook (MDA) | 13 |
| Damon Sansum (GBR) | 14 | Damon Sansum (GBR) | 3 |
| Tahir Güleç (GER) | 6 | Mehdi Khodabakhshi (IRI) | 16 |
| Mehdi Khodabakhshi (IRI) | 8 |

=== Top half ===
==== Section 1 ====
Round of 64
Mederic Enguerin (CAF) | 6
Hidenori Ebata (JPN) | 8
Michel Fernandes (POR) | 17
Nikolas Pirikkis (CYP) | 5
~~Yordan Kolev (BUL)~~
Roberto Botta (ITA) | DQ
Oussama Oueslati (TUN) | DQ
~~Ahmad Wali Alif (AFG)~~
~~Yasir Ahmed Al-Haj (SUD)~~ | DQ
~~Moisés Hernández (DOM)~~ | DQ
Inoussa Sawadogo (FRA) | 15
Mauro Busuttil (MLT) | 3
Craig Brown (JAM) | 2
Yunus Sarı (TUR) | 14

Round of 32
Aaron Cook (MDA) | 12
Hidenori Ebata (JPN) | 9
Michel Fernandes (POR) | 3
Roberto Botta (ITA) | 4
Oussama Oueslati (TUN)
Bye
Inoussa Sawadogo (FRA) | 0
Yunus Sarı (TUR) | 9

Round of 16
Aaron Cook (MDA) | 9
Roberto Botta (ITA) | 8
Oussama Oueslati (TUN) | 7
Yunus Sarı (TUR) | 11

Quarterfinals
Aaron Cook (MDA) | 8
Yunus Sarı (TUR) | 7

==== Section 2 ====
Round of 64
Damon Sansum (GBR) | 15
Atief Arshad (PAK) | 3
Björn Thorleifsson (ISL) | 8
Richard Ordemann (NOR) | 9
Vaughn Scott (NZL) | 15
Mahmoud Said (EGY) | 11
~~Juan Sánchez (PUR)~~
Hayder Shkara (AUS) | DQ
Piotr Paziński (POL) | 5
Daniel Quesada (ESP) | 9
Uladzislau Saulukou (BLR) | 14
Qiao Sen (CHN) | 13
Liu Wei-ting (TPE) | DQ
~~Sylvain Fostin (GDL)~~

Round of 32
Damon Sansum (GBR) | 16
Richard Ordemann (NOR) | 12
Vaughn Scott (NZL) | 3
Hayder Shkara (AUS) | 8
Daniel Quesada (ESP) | 4
Uladzislau Saulukou (BLR) | 5
Liu Wei-ting (TPE) | 4
Aydemir Shakhbanov (RUS) | 3

Round of 16
Damon Sansum (GBR) | 13
Hayder Shkara (AUS) | 10
Uladzislau Saulukou (BLR) | 4
Liu Wei-ting (TPE) | 9

Quarterfinals
Damon Sansum (GBR) | 12
Liu Wei-ting (TPE) | 10

=== Bottom half ===
==== Section 3 ====
Round of 64
Waldeck Defaix (FPO) | 4
Serhiy Chaika (UKR) | 6
Miguel Ferrera (HON) | 9
Hama Alzouma (NIG) | 15
Elías Robles (CHI) | 2
Maksim Rafalovich (UZB) | 11
Arman Yeremyan (ARM) | 4
Taha Al-Aswed (LBA) | 2
~~Daba Modibo Keïta (MLI)~~
Christopher Iliesco (CAN) | DQ
Ivan Karajlović (SRB) | 17
Deivis Escorcia (COL) | 15
Kim Bong-su (KOR) | 18
René Lizárraga (MEX) | 5

Round of 32
Tahir Güleç (GER) | 8
Serhiy Chaika (UKR) | 6
Hama Alzouma (NIG) | 3
Maksim Rafalovich (UZB) | 6
Arman Yeremyan (ARM) | 3
Christopher Iliesco (CAN) | 5
Ivan Karajlović (SRB) | 10
Kim Bong-su (KOR) | 8

Round of 16
Tahir Güleç (GER) | 6
Maksim Rafalovich (UZB) | 5
Christopher Iliesco (CAN) | 6
Ivan Karajlović (SRB) | 2

Quarterfinals
Tahir Güleç (GER) | 5
Christopher Iliesco (CAN) | 3

==== Section 4 ====
Round of 64
Steven López (USA) | 13
Ibrahim Benoud Radjab (CHA) | 0
Mohammed Murtala (NGR) | 5
Farkhod Negmatov (TJK) | 22
Mahmoud Abdelrahim (QAT) | 10
Agustin Alves (ARG) | 9
Akbar Aitakhunov (KGZ) | 3
Cheick Sallah Cissé (CIV) | 16
Christian dela Cruz (PHI) | DQ
~~Kelly Oyoo (KEN)~~
Maksat Abdrambek (KAZ) | 8
André Bilia (BRA) | 11
Nikolaos Tzellos (GRE) | DQ
~~Anas Taleb Abdallah (JOR)~~

Round of 32
Steven López (USA) | 10
Farkhod Negmatov (TJK) | 5
Mahmoud Abdelrahim (QAT) | 5
Cheick Sallah Cissé (CIV) | 15^{P}
Christian dela Cruz (PHI) | 2
André Bilia (BRA) | 6
Nikolaos Tzellos (GRE) | 3
Mehdi Khodabakhshi (IRI) | 5

Round of 16
Steven López (USA) | 4
Cheick Sallah Cissé (CIV) | 3
André Bilia (BRA) | 1
Mehdi Khodabakhshi (IRI) | 8

Quarterfinals
Steven López (USA) | 1
Mehdi Khodabakhshi (IRI) | 13
