= 2022 World Taekwondo Championships – Men's welterweight =

Taekwondo competitions

Men's welterweight at the 2022 World Championships
- Venue: Centro Acuático CODE Metropolitano
- Dates: 14 November 2022
- Competitors: 46 from 46 nations

Medalists
gold medal	Park Woo-hyeok	South Korea
silver medal	Andoni Cintado	Spain
bronze medal	Mehran Barkhordari	Iran
bronze medal	Seif Eissa	Egypt

The men's welterweight is a competition featured at the 2022 World Taekwondo Championships, and was held at the Centro Acuático CODE Metropolitano in Guadalajara, Mexico on 14 November 2022. Welterweights were limited to a maximum of 80 kilograms in body mass.

== Results ==
Legend

- DQ — Won by disqualification
- P — Won by punitive declaration
- W — Won by withdrawal

=== Finals ===
Semifinals				Final
Mehran Barkhordari (IRI)	9	7	5
Park Woo-hyeok (KOR)	5	14	9	Park Woo-hyeok (KOR)	2	8
Seif Eissa (EGY)	4	0	3	Andoni Cintado (ESP)	0	4
Andoni Cintado (ESP)	2	0	5

=== Top half ===
==== Section 1 ====
Round of 64
~~Idrissa Mahamadou (NIG)~~
Altangereliin Azbayar (MGL)	D	Q
Tormod Davis (CAN)	0	4
Mehran Barkhordari (IRI)	7	8
Karol Robak (POL)	D	Q
~~Joseph Omukuba (KEN)~~

Round of 32
Simone Alessio (ITA)	1	2	2
Altangereliin Azbayar (MGL)	0	3	5
Joaquín Churchill (CHI)	0	3
Hüseyin Kartal (TUR)	3	3
Moisés Hernández (DOM)	1	2
Mehran Barkhordari (IRI)	3	3
Karol Robak (POL)
Shukhrat Salaev (UZB)	W

Round of 16
Altangereliin Azbayar (MGL)	3	3	5
Hüseyin Kartal (TUR)	1	12	5
Mehran Barkhordari (IRI)	3	3
Shukhrat Salaev (UZB)	1	1

Quarterfinals
Altangereliin Azbayar (MGL)	0	6	5
Mehran Barkhordari (IRI)	3	1	7

==== Section 2 ====
Round of 64
Mohamed Ouattara (CIV)	0	1
Rakhym Adilkhanov (KAZ)	7	12^{P}
Henrique Marques (BRA)	D	Q
~~Ibrahima Diallo (GUI)~~
Tamon Kusumoto (JPN)	1	2
Aleksandr Filippov (ISR)	14	14
Ali Al-Mabrouk (KSA)	D	Q
~~Sajitha Abesingha (SRI)~~

Round of 32
CJ Nickolas (USA)	3	4
Rakhym Adilkhanov (KAZ)	6	6
Henrique Marques (BRA)	0	3	0
Aleksandar Radojkovic (AUT)	4	1	0
Park Woo-hyeok (KOR)	0	6
Aleksandr Filippov (ISR)	0	3
Ali Al-Mabrouk (KSA)	1	2	2
José María Pastor (MEX)	0	4	0

Round of 16
Rakhym Adilkhanov (KAZ)	2	1	0
Henrique Marques (BRA)	0	1	2
Park Woo-hyeok (KOR)	8	7
Ali Al-Mabrouk (KSA)	1	1

Quarterfinals
Henrique Marques (BRA)	0	2
Park Woo-hyeok (KOR)	4	7

=== Bottom half ===
==== Section 3 ====
Round of 64
Wang Te-lung (TPE)	13	9
Arber Bajra (KOS)	1	7
Edi Hrnic (DEN)	D	Q
~~Jerome Browne (TTO)~~
Yarobis Castañeda (CUB)	2	2
Kostiantyn Kostenevych (UKR)	3	6
Dylan Olmedo (ARG)	7	4	4
Teddy Lessakolo (GAB)	3	5	5

Round of 32
Seif Eissa (EGY)	4	7
Wang Te-lung (TPE)	1	3
Edi Hrnic (DEN)	9	W
David Robleto (NCA)	1
Faysal Sawadogo (BUR)	9	5	2
Kostiantyn Kostenevych (UKR)	21	1	11
Teddy Lessakolo (GAB)	4	0	0
Richard Ordemann (NOR)	1	10	7

Round of 16
Seif Eissa (EGY)	0	4	3
Edi Hrnic (DEN)	0	0	1
Kostiantyn Kostenevych (UKR)	2	2	2
Richard Ordemann (NOR)	6	2	0

Quarterfinals
Seif Eissa (EGY)	1	2	5
Kostiantyn Kostenevych (UKR)	2	0	4

==== Section 4 ====
Round of 64
~~Michael Davidson (GHA)~~
Alejandro González (PUR)	D	Q
~~Ababacar Sadikh Soumaré (SEN)~~
Yosafe Zakoulouta (AUS)	D	Q
Tang Hao (CHN)	12	6
Alejandro Flores (CRC)	1	0

Round of 32
Apostolos Telikostoglou (GRE)	4	6
Alejandro González (PUR)	0	4
Yosafe Zakoulouta (AUS)	3	2
Miguel Trejos (COL)	4	3
Andoni Cintado (ESP)	0	4	9
Júlio Ferreira (POR)	5	3	1
Tang Hao (CHN)	6	9
Saleh El-Sharabaty (JOR)	12	10

Round of 16
Apostolos Telikostoglou (GRE)	3	4
Miguel Trejos (COL)	2	4
Andoni Cintado (ESP)	0	4	4
Saleh El-Sharabaty (JOR)	3	3	4

Quarterfinals
Apostolos Telikostoglou (GRE)	2	2
Andoni Cintado (ESP)	4	2
