= Taekwondo at the 2022 Asian Games – Men's 80 kg =

Taekwondo competition

Men's 80 kg at the 2022 Asian Games
- Venue: Lin'an Sports and Culture Centre
- Date: 27 September 2023
- Competitors: 20 from 20 nations

Medalists
| gold medal | Park Woo-hyeok | South Korea |
| silver medal | Saleh El-Sharabaty | Jordan |
| bronze medal | Saif Taher | Iraq |
| bronze medal | Mehran Barkhordari | Iran |

The men's 80 kilograms event at the 2022 Asian Games took place on 27 September 2023 at Lin'an Sports and Culture Centre, Hangzhou, China.

== Schedule ==
All times are China Standard Time (UTC+08:00)

| Date | Time | Event |
|---|---|---|
| Wednesday, 27 September 2023 | 09:00 | Round of 32 |
| Wednesday, 27 September 2023 | 09:00 | Round of 16 |
| Wednesday, 27 September 2023 | 14:00 | Quarterfinals |
| Wednesday, 27 September 2023 | 14:00 | Semifinals |
| Wednesday, 27 September 2023 | 14:00 | Gold medal contest |

== Results ==
Legend

- P — Won by punitive declaration

=== Final ===
| Gold medal contest |
| Saleh El-Sharabaty (JOR) | 5 | 5 |
| Park Woo-hyeok (KOR) | 8 | 6 |

=== Top half ===
Round of 32
Cui Yang (CHN) | 16 | 13
Tam Ching Nam (HKG) | 4 | 0
Saif Taher (IRQ) | 5 | 14
Lin Ka Ho (MAC) | 0 | 1

Round of 16
Saleh El-Sharabaty (JOR) | 2 | 5
Cui Yang (CHN) | 0 | 2
Bandar Al-Enezi (KUW) | 0 | 2
Jasurbek Jaysunov (UZB) | 10 | 13
Wang Te-lung (TPE) | 11 | 13
Ricardo Suzuki (JPN) | 11 | 0
Saif Taher (IRQ) | 8 | 10 | 7
Nurlan Myrzabayev (KAZ) | 11 | 8 | 5

Quarterfinals
Saleh El-Sharabaty (JOR) | 0 | 8 | 4
Jasurbek Jaysunov (UZB) | 2 | 5 | 2
Wang Te-lung (TPE) | 10 | 8
Saif Taher (IRQ) | 15 | 10

Semifinals
Saleh El-Sharabaty (JOR) | 8 | 5
Saif Taher (IRQ) | 1 | 3

=== Bottom half ===
Round of 32
Abhishek Baral (NEP) | 1 | 2
Omid Sahak (AFG) | 11 | 15
Va Mithona (CAM) | 3 | 5
Shivansh Tyagi (IND) | 3 | 8

Round of 16
Mehran Barkhordari (IRI) | 7 | 15
Omid Sahak (AFG) | 0 | 2
Dave Cea (PHI) | 16 | 11
Mohammed Al-Sowaiq (KSA) | 10 | 6
Phạm Minh Bảo Kha (VIE) | 0 | 1
Jack Woody Mercer (THA) | 13 | 13
Shivansh Tyagi (IND) | 6 | 1
Park Woo-hyeok (KOR) | 15 | 15

Quarterfinals
Mehran Barkhordari (IRI) | 12 | 13^{P}
Dave Cea (PHI) | 0 | 7
Jack Woody Mercer (THA) | 6 | 7
Park Woo-hyeok (KOR) | 12 | 13

Semifinals
Mehran Barkhordari (IRI) | 3 | 11 | 10
Park Woo-hyeok (KOR) | 6 | 8 | 10
