= 劍道 =

劍道, 剣道 or 剑道 ("way of the sword") may refer to:

- Kendo, a Japanese martial art
- Kumdo, a Korean martial art based on kendo

Kendo in American English may refer to:

- Kendo Holdings, beauty conglomorate based in San Francisco
