= Hogo =

Hogo may refer to:

- Dharma talk (Japanese: Hōgo), a public discourse on Buddhism by a Buddhist teacher
- Hōgō, a mantra associated with Kūkai (774–835), a Japanese Buddhist monk, calligrapher, and poet
- Hogo, the scent associated with certain liquors, such as rum
- Hogo Onkokuin, a Buddhist name of Tokugawa Ieyasu (1543–1616), Japanese samurai, daimyo and the first Tokugawa shōgun
- Jiku Hōgo, Romanized name of Dharmarakṣa (c. 233–310), an early translator of Mahayana sutras into Chinese
- Lake Hogo, one of the lakes of Ounianga in the Sahara Desert in Chad

== See also ==
- Hogu, armor worn by practitioners of taekwondo and geomdo during sparring and competition
