= Aaron Cook (taekwondo) =

Taekwondo athlete for Great Britain, the Isle of Man, and Moldova

Personal information
- Full name: Aaron Arthur Cook
- Born: 2 January 1991 (age 35) Dorchester, Dorset, Great Britain
- Spouse: Bianca Walkden (m. 2022)

Sport
- Sport: Taekwondo
- Event: -80 kg
- Coached by: Luke Cook; Patrice Remarck; Joseph Salim
Medal record
Men's taekwondo
Representing Moldova
World Championships
Bronze medal – third place	2015 Chelyabinsk	Welterweight (−80 kg)
Bronze medal – third place	2017 Muju	Welterweight (−80 kg)
European Championships
Silver medal – second place	2018 Kazan	−80 kg
Bronze medal – third place	2016 Montreux	−80 kg
Grand Prix
Silver medal – second place	2015 Moscow	−80 kg
Silver medal – second place	2015 Mexico City	−80 kg
Silver medal – second place	2017 Moscow	−80 kg
Bronze medal – third place	2017 London	−80 kg
Representing Isle of Man
European Championships
Gold medal – first place	2014 Baku	−80 kg
Grand Prix
Gold medal – first place	2014 Suzhou	−80 kg
Silver medal – second place	2014 Manchester	−80 kg
Bronze medal – third place	2013 Manchester	−80 kg
Representing Great Britain
European Championships
Gold medal – first place	2010 Saint Petersburg	−80 kg
Gold medal – first place	2012 Manchester	−80 kg
World Junior Championships
Gold medal – first place	2008 İzmir	−78 kg
Bronze medal – third place	2006 Ho Chi Minh City	−68 kg
European Junior Championships
Gold medal – first place	2007 Baku	−73 kg

Aaron Arthur Cook (born 2 January 1991) is a taekwondo athlete who has represented Great Britain (the nation of his birth), the Isle of Man, and Moldova. He has been ranked the number one in the men's −80 kg division on several occasions. He is three-times a European champion having won the −80 kg title at the European Taekwondo Championships in 2010, 2012 representing Great Britain and 2014 representing the Isle of Man, and was the world junior champion in the −78 kg division in 2008.

He represented Great Britain in the 2008 Olympic Games in Beijing, where he reached the semi-final and was narrowly defeated in the bronze medal match. He was controversially left out of the British team for the 2012 Olympic Games in London despite being the world no. 1-ranked competitor in the −80 kg division when the British Taekwondo Control Board selected Lutalo Muhammad (who was ranked world no. 59 in −80 kg and world no. 7 in −87 kg). Following this, Cook indicated he could no longer work with the governing authorities in Great Britain, and switched allegiance to the Isle of Man. This move to a non-Olympic nation ostensibly allowed Cook to achieve qualification for the 2016 Summer Olympics for Great Britain, the country for which Isle of Man athletes participate at the Olympics.

He represented the Isle of Man in international tournaments from February 2013 until 2015 when following further discussions with the Great Britain authorities, Cook sought and obtained Moldovan citizenship and announced that he would compete for Moldova. At the 2015 World Taekwondo Championships, Cook represented his new country for the first time, losing to former Great Britain teammate Damon Sansum in the semi-final. Despite this, Cook won the bronze medal in his weight category, his first medal in a World Championship. Cook later won silver at the 2018 European Taekwondo Championships in Kazan in the 80 kg weight category.

== Early life ==
He was born in Dorchester, Dorset, and attended The Thomas Hardye School.

== Career ==
=== International breakthrough ===
Cook made his breakthrough into senior competition at the 2007 Dutch Open Championships, held in Eindhoven, at the age of 16. He took bronze in his debut senior competition, losing to French athlete Torann Mazeroi 12–10 in the semi-finals.

The following week Cook appeared in the German Open Championships in Bonn and took his maiden senior open title. In the final he defeated his fellow British competitor Davoud Etminani 12–11. He then went to compete and secured his place on the British team for the 2007 World Taekwondo Championships at a closed-door round robin competition held at Loughborough University. At the 2007 World Taekwondo Championship he defeated Gauti Mar Gundason of Iceland in the first round. In the second round he faced the toughest opponent of his young career, Hadi Saei of Iran who had won gold medals at both the 2005 World Taekwondo Championships and the 2004 Olympic Games. Cook could not get past the experienced Iranian and lost with a score of 11–6.

Later in his debut year, Cook qualified for a spot on the British team for the 2008 Olympic Games by competing at the 2007 World Qualification Tournament held at the MEN Arena in Manchester. In the first round he faced Ireland's Sean Joyce and won 9–2. He then won with the same score against Switzerland's Markus Jiskra. In the last 16, Cook faced Philippines' Alexander Briones and won with a score of 5–2. In the quarter-finals, Cook's tournament ended in a 5–3 defeat to the 6 ft 5in Italian Mauro Sarmiento.

=== 2008 Olympic Games ===
At the 2008 Olympic Games in Beijing, Cook began by defeating Anju Jason of the Marshall Islands 7–0 in his first match. The second match was against a stronger competitor, but he defeated Carlos Vasquez of Venezuela 5–2. In the semi-finals Cook lost to Italy's Mauro Sarmiento. Cook and Sarmiento had been tied 5–5 with going into the last 10 seconds of the bout, but Sarmiento scored a crucial late strike to win 6–5.

After defeat his semi-final defeat, Cook faced Zhu Guo of China in the bronze medal match. Cook lost the match 4–1. He was baffled that the British supporting team did not make an appeal during the first round of the bout when the judges missed a clear offensive kick which connected with the Chinese fighter's head which would have given Cook a 2–1 lead. Cook was later penalised a point for receiving two warnings.

=== World Taekwondo Tour 2009 ===
At the inaugural World Taekwondo Tour event in Mexico City, Cook came from behind to defeat the American former Olympic and world champion Steven López with a knockout victory in the −80 kg final. In the second round of the match, Cook sent López to the floor with a headshot. After winning £17,880 Cook said "To beat the world champion makes it the greatest win in my career so far. It is amazing to take gold."

=== 2012 Summer Olympics ===
Cook became the world no. 1-ranked competitor in the −80 kg division for the first time in June 2010. Following a surprise defeat in his opening bout at the 2011 World Taekwondo Championships, Cook decided to leave British Taekwondo's training programme and focus on his own training programme using his own coaches, including ex Manchester United F.C Strength and Conditioning coach Mick Clegg and funded by his own sponsors. After leaving the British Taekwondo set-up, he won a number of tournaments including the Olympic test event in London in December 2011 as well as successfully defending his −80 kg title at the 2012 European Championships. He regained the world no. 1 ranking a few months before the 2012 Olympic Games in London.

The British Taekwondo Control Board selected Lutalo Muhammad as their competitor in the −80 kg instead of Cook for the olympics. Muhammad was the European champion in the non-Olympic −87 kg category, and was ranked the world no. 7 in the −87 kg division and the world no. 59 in the −80 kg division. Cook had won two of the three competitive bouts between himself and Muhammad and had considerably more international competitive experience. His omission was controversial and he considered legal action to overturn the decision, his agent saying: "If the British world number one and reigning European Champion does not compete, it will be a national disgrace. This is an embarrassment not only for the sport of taekwondo internationally, but also for Great Britain's international reputation in hosting the London 2012 Games." Many in the British sporting community and the press voiced concerns that Cook had been deliberately overlooked due to his decision to leave the British Taekwondo training programme as this had left the national association feeling slighted by Cook. However, Team GB Taekwondo performance director Gary Hall commented on the controversy by saying: "In some ways, Aaron has a bigger marketing machine than the whole of GB Taekwondo." Women's world champion Sarah Stevenson defended the selection, saying that: "To be world number one on a rankings system is not what taekwondo is, it doesn't mean you're the best in the world. I don't even care or know what ranking I am, and people need to realise this. It's really unfair that GB Taekwondo are getting criticised for not picking a world number one." The British Olympic Association (BOA) initially refused to ratify Muhammad's selection, but eventually endorsed the decision after a second selection committee meeting, held with a BOA observer present, led to a confirmation of Muhammad's selection.

=== Competitor for Isle of Man ===
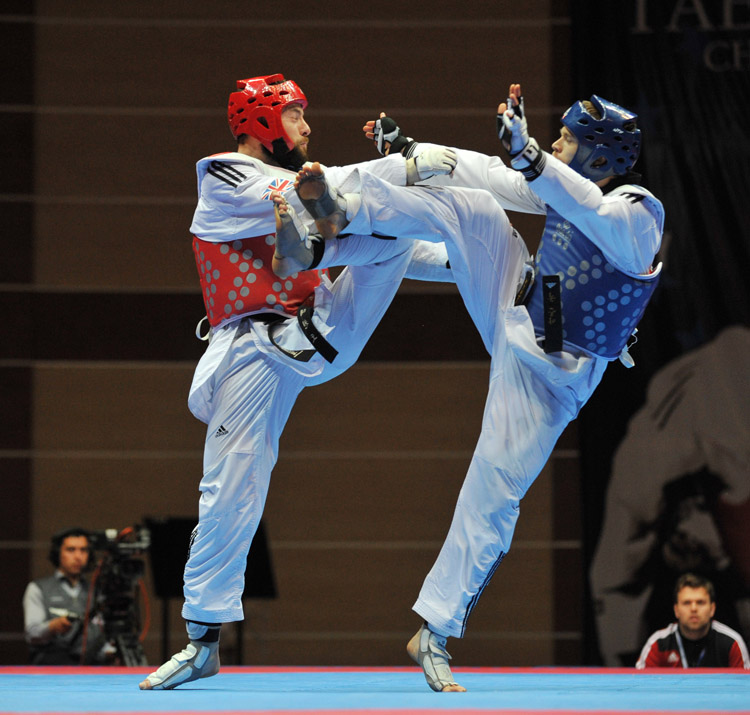
Aaron Cook (blue) at the Euro 2014 in Baku. Final against Damon Sansum

Following his omission from the British Olympic team, Cook decided to represent the Isle of Man (a British Crown dependency) instead of Great Britain in international competitions. Athletes from the Isle of Man are eligible to represent Great Britain in the Olympic Games.

Cook represented the Isle of Man for the first time at the 2013 Swedish Open, going on to win the gold medal in the −80 kg category. Competing for the Isle of Man, Cook won the gold medal at the Pan American Open in Mexico in 2013 by beating Beat Mexico 15–3, Canada 16–4, USA 14–5 and Costa Rica in final 12–3. He was also awarded best fighter in the tournament. At the end of 2013, Cook again regained the world no. 1 ranking in the −80 kg division. In 2014, Cook won the −80 kg title at the European Championships for the third time, beating Britain's Damon Sansum in the final.

=== Moldovan citizenship ===
After 12 months of further discussion between Cook, British Taekwondo and the BOA, after an approach by Moldovan billionaire Igor Iuzefovici, who is also president of Moldova's taekwondo federation, sponsored by Iuzefovici, Cook gained Moldovan citizenship and a passport. He announced in April 2015 his intention to represent Moldova specifically at the 2016 Summer Olympics in Rio de Janeiro. In April 2015 the British Olympic Association agreed to Cook's request to switch nations. Cook won a bronze medal for Moldova at the 2015 World Taekwondo Championships in Russia in May 2015 where he was beaten by Damon Sansum.

=== 2016 Summer Olympics ===
Representing Moldova, Cook was eliminated in the last sixteen by Liu Wei-ting of Chinese Taipei with a score of 14–2.

=== 2018 ===
Competing for Moldova at the 24th Zagreb Open in Croatia, Cook won Gold after beating Luka Horvat 24–7 in the Male -80 kg Final. This result was closely followed by a dominant display at the 14th French Open in Paris in which Cook once again claimed Gold in the -80 kg male final by beating Maxime Potvin of Canada 19–15.
