= Kim Kwang-seok (disambiguation) =

Kim Kwang-seok (1964–1996) is a South Korean folk rock singer.

Kim Gwang-seok or Kim Kwang-sok (Korean: 김광석) may also refer to:

- Kim Kwang-seok (martial arts) (born 1936)
- Kim Gwang-seok (wrestler) (born 1977), South Korean wrestler
- Kim Gwang-seok (footballer) (born 1983), South Korea footballer

== See also ==
- Kim Gwang-suk (Korean: 김광숙), North Korean gymnast
- Kim Kwang-suk, North Korean singer
