= Jiskra =

Jiskra (a Czech word meaning "spark") may refer to:

== People ==
- John Jiskra of Brandýs (c. 1400 – c. 1469), Czech strategist and mercenary soldier
- Markus Jiskra, Swiss international taekwondo player who competed in the 2008 Olympics

== Czech sports clubs ==
- DSO Jiskra Gottwaldov, ice hockey, former name of PSG Berani Zlín
- FK Jiskra Třeboň, football
- Jiskra Gottwaldov, football, former name of FC Fastav Zlín
- Jiskra Liberec, football, defunct
- Jiskra Otrokovice, football, former name of SK Baťov 1930
- Jiskra Staré Město, football, former name of 1. FC Slovácko
- Jiskra Varnsdorf, football, former name of FK Varnsdorf
- TJ Jiskra Domažlice, football, former name of FK Jablonec
- TJ Jiskra Jablonec nad Nisou, football
- TJ Jiskra Jaroměř, football, former name of FK Jaroměř
- TJ Jiskra Ústí nad Orlicí, football
