= Steve Jennings =

Steve or Stephen Jennings may refer to:

- Steve Jennings (footballer) (born 1984), English professional footballer
- Steve Jennings (field hockey) (born 1969), former field hockey defender
- Steve Jennings (taekwondo) (born 1981), GB taekwondo national team coach
- Stephen Arthur Jennings (1915–1979), mathematician

== See also ==
- Stephen Jenyns (1450–1523), English nobleman
