= Taekwondo at the 2023 European Games – Men's 80 kg =

Taekwondo competition

Men's 80 kg at the 2023 European Games
- Venue: Krynica-Zdrój Arena
- Date: 25 June
- Competitors: 17 from 17 nations

Medalists
gold medal	Edi Hrnic	Denmark
silver medal	Richard Ordemann	Norway
bronze medal	Apostolos Telikostoglou	Greece
bronze medal	Hüseyin Kartal	Turkey

The men's 80 kg competition in taekwondo at the 2023 European Games took place on 25 June at the Krynica-Zdrój Arena.

== Schedule ==
All times are Central European Summer Time (UTC+2).

Date	Time	Event
Sunday, 25 June 2023	09:00	Round of 32
Sunday, 25 June 2023	09:24	Round of 16
Sunday, 25 June 2023	14:12	Quarterfinals
Sunday, 25 June 2023	15:48	Semifinals
Sunday, 25 June 2023	16:36	Repechage
Sunday, 25 June 2023	19:12	Bronze medal bouts
Sunday, 25 June 2023	20:36	Final

== Results ==
Round of 32
Christos Achilleos (CYP)	6	5
Adam Jochman (CZE)	15	16

Round of 16
Richard Ordemann (NOR)	6	4
Adam Jochman (CZE)	1	2
Ismaël Bouzid (FRA)	4	7	6
Hüseyin Kartal (TUR)	6	6	6
Kostiantyn Kostenevych (UKR)	4	3
Júlio Ferreira (POR)	3	3
Aleksandr Filippov (ISR)	3	7	10
Szymon Piątkowski (POL)	6	6	11
Andoni Cintado (ESP)	7	1
Antonio Gerrone (ITA)	6	1
Kasra Mehdipournejad (EOR)	4	8
Matej Nikolić (CRO)	2	6
Aleksandar Radojkovic (AUT)	2	5	3
Edi Hrnic (DEN)	3	4	15
Arber Bajra (KOS)	0	3
Apostolos Telikostoglou (GRE)	12	14

Quarterfinals
Richard Ordemann (NOR)	10	8	12
Hüseyin Kartal (TUR)	4	9	3
Kostiantyn Kostenevych (UKR)	3	7	4
Szymon Piątkowski (POL)	4	1	6
Andoni Cintado (ESP)	6	5
Kasra Mehdipournejad (EOR)	3	3
Edi Hrnic (DEN)	6	4	10
Apostolos Telikostoglou (GRE)	4	6	5

Semifinals
Richard Ordemann (NOR)	4	11
Szymon Piątkowski (POL)	2	2
Andoni Cintado (ESP)	4	4	7
Edi Hrnic (DEN)	2	5	11

Final
Richard Ordemann (NOR)	4	6
Edi Hrnic (DEN)	8	7

=== Repechage ===
Repechage				Bronze medal bout
				Andoni Cintado (ESP)	6	2
Hüseyin Kartal (TUR)	5	5	11	Hüseyin Kartal (TUR)	8	4
Adam Jochman (CZE)	10	2	4
Aleksandar Radojkovic (AUT)	0	2
Apostolos Telikostoglou (GRE)	6	4		Apostolos Telikostoglou (GRE)	2	7	4
				Szymon Piątkowski (POL)	2	4	2
