= Sib Pal Gi =

Sib Pal Gi (or Sib Pal Ki, Korean 십팔기, 十八技 "Eighteen Methods", or 十八般武艺 "Eighteen Fighting Methods", shortened from Bonjo Muye Sib Pal Ban 본조무예십팔반, 文章武藝十八般, "18 Martial Arts Classes of the Yi Dynasty") may refer to:

- Korean martial arts, generally
  - specifically, the eighteen historical disciplines of the Muyesinbo
  - by extension, the twenty-four disciplines of the Muyedobotongji
  - a modern eclectic system of Korean martial arts, see Sib Pal Gi Association
- a generic Korean term for Chinese martial arts
  - the Chinese concept of Eighteen Arms of Wushu
