= Taekwondo at the 2018 Asian Games – Men's 80 kg =

Taekwondo competition

Men's 80 kg at the 2018 Asian Games
- Venue: Jakarta Convention Center
- Date: 22 August 2018
- Competitors: 21 from 21 nations

Medalists
gold medal	Nikita Rafalovich	Uzbekistan
silver medal	Lee Hwa-jun	South Korea
bronze medal	Saleh El-Sharabaty	Jordan
bronze medal	Nurlan Myrzabayev	Kazakhstan

The men's welterweight (80 kilograms) event at the 2018 Asian Games took place on 22 August 2018 at Jakarta Convention Center Plenary Hall, Jakarta, Indonesia.

== Schedule ==
All times are Western Indonesia Time (UTC+07:00)

Date	Time	Event
Wednesday, 22 August 2018	10:00	Round of 32
Wednesday, 22 August 2018	10:00	Round of 16
Wednesday, 22 August 2018	10:00	Quarterfinals
Wednesday, 22 August 2018	16:00	Semifinals
Wednesday, 22 August 2018	16:00	Final

== Results ==
Legend

- P — Won by punitive declaration
- R — Won by referee stop contest

=== Final ===
Final
Nikita Rafalovich (UZB)	21
Lee Hwa-jun (KOR)	18

=== Top half ===
Round of 32
Nur Putra Danial Azlan (MAS)	13
Pürevjavyn Temüüjin (MGL)	35
Navjeet Maan (IND)	32
Somsanouk Phommavanh (LAO)	18
Hidenori Ebata (JPN)	24
Dinggo Ardian Prayogo (INA)	20

Round of 16
Nikita Rafalovich (UZB)	25^{P}
Pürevjavyn Temüüjin (MGL)	7
Ramesh Hussaini (AFG)	27
Bhupen Shrestha (NEP)	7
Chen Linglong (CHN)	20
Navjeet Maan (IND)	6
Hidenori Ebata (JPN)	8
Saleh El-Sharabaty (JOR)	28

Quarterfinals
Nikita Rafalovich (UZB)	11
Ramesh Hussaini (AFG)	0
Chen Linglong (CHN)	8
Saleh El-Sharabaty (JOR)	13

Semifinals
Nikita Rafalovich (UZB)	4
Saleh El-Sharabaty (JOR)	2

=== Bottom half ===
Round of 32
Saud Al-Muwallad (KSA)	1
Nurlan Myrzabayev (KAZ)	12
Sonam Wangchuk (BHU)	2
Lee Hwa-jun (KOR)	36^{R}

Round of 16
Liu Wei-ting (TPE)	1
Nurlan Myrzabayev (KAZ)	3
Ali Al-Araimi (QAT)	19
Akbar Aitakhunov (KGZ)	22
Samuel Morrison (PHI)	19
Farkhod Negmatov (TJK)	17
Lee Hwa-jun (KOR)	24
Mehdi Khodabakhshi (IRI)	22

Quarterfinals
Nurlan Myrzabayev (KAZ)	22
Akbar Aitakhunov (KGZ)	2
Samuel Morrison (PHI)	18
Lee Hwa-jun (KOR)	27

Semifinals
Nurlan Myrzabayev (KAZ)	16
Lee Hwa-jun (KOR)	17
