= British Taekwondo =

British Taekwondo National Governing Body

- Formation: 1982
- Headquarters: Manchester
- Members: 15,000
- Website: http://www.britishtaekwondo.org.uk

British Taekwondo Limited, operating as British Taekwondo is the National Governing Body for World Taekwondo in Great Britain. It is a member of, and recognised by, World Taekwondo, the international governing body for taekwondo as recognised by the International Olympic Committee and the International Paralympic Committee. British Taekwondo is also a member of the British Olympic Association (BOA), the British Paralympic Association (BPA) and the European Taekwondo Union (ETU).

Established in 1982 its functions include responsibility for the selection of National Teams to compete at International and Olympic level.

A second body founded in 2002, Sport Taekwondo UK Ltd operating as GB Taewkondo is responsible, with the support of its parent body, British Taekwondo, for the management of the elite competitive taekwondo and para taekwondo programs in Great Britain, and the hosting in Great Britain of elite level competitive taekwondo events.

== Five tenets of BTCB (WTF Style) Taekwondo ==
- Etiquette
- Modesty
- Perseverance
- Self Control
- Indomitable Spirit

== BTCB (WTF Style) Taekwondo student oath ==
- To observe the tenets of Taekwondo
- To have respect for instructors and fellow students
- To never misuse the art of taekwondo
- To be a champion of freedom and justice
- To help build a more peaceful world

== Advancement ==
Advancing through the belts is by a system of gradings. Gradings are typically held in 3–4 month cycles at regional training centres across the UK. Black belt promotion tests are held three time per year at venue around the UK. Grading systems will typically consist of line work, patterns, theory, and sparring. Students can typically advance through the belts at a rate of 1 Kup every 3 months.

=== Belts ===
BTCB uses the following system of Belt Gradings:

- 10th Kup – White belt (white signifies innocence, as a student with no previous knowledge of Taekwondo)
- 9th Kup – White belt with yellow tag
- 8th Kup – Yellow belt (yellow signifies earth, from which the metaphorical plant sprouts forth and takes root as the foundations of Taekwondo are laid)
- 7th Kup – Yellow belt with green tag
- 6th Kup – Green belt (green signifies the plant's growth as skills are developed)
- 5th Kup – Green belt with blue tag
- 4th Kup – Blue belt (blue signifies heaven, towards which the plant is growing as training progresses)
- 3rd Kup – Blue belt with red tag
- 2nd Kup – Red belt (red signifies danger, cautioning the student to exercise control and warning opponents)
- 1st Kup – Red belt with black tag
- 1st Dan – Black belt (black is opposite to white and signifies maturity and proficiency in taekwondo)

BTCB (WTF Style) uses the Poomsae style of teaching Taekwondo.

== Olympic Taekwondo ==
GB Taekwondo holds the mandate for selecting National Team players and Olympic Team players in the UK. Since Taekwondo's inception at the 2000 Sydney Olympics, The UK has fielded several players into Olympic tournaments, such as Steve Jennings, Paul Green, Sarah Stevenson, Aaron Cook and Michael Harvey. To date, five medals have been won (Sarah Stevenson – Bronze at the 2008 Beijing Olympics, Jade Jones – Gold at the 2012 London Olympics and 2016 Rio Olympics as well as, Lutalo Muhammad – Bronze & Silver at the 2012 London Olympics and 2016 Rio Olympics).
