= Chen Linglong =

Chinese taekwondo practitioner

Personal information
- Born: 25 November 1993 (age 32)

Sport
- Country: China
- Sport: Taekwondo
Medal record
Men's taekwondo
Representing China
Asian Games
Silver medal – second place	2014 Incheon	87 kg
Asian Taekwondo Championships
Gold medal – first place	2018 Ho Chi Minh City	80 kg
Asian Indoor and Martial Arts Games
Silver medal – second place	2017 Ashgabat	80 kg

Chen Linglong (Chinese: 陈灵龙; born 25 November 1993) is a Chinese taekwondo practitioner. He is a silver medalist at the Asian Games and the Asian Indoor and Martial Arts Games. He is also a gold medalist at the Asian Taekwondo Championships.

In 2014, he won the silver medal in the men's 87 kg event at the 2014 Asian Games held in Incheon, South Korea.

In 2017, he won the silver medal in the men's −80 kg event at the 2017 Asian Indoor and Martial Arts Games held in Ashgabat, Turkmenistan. In 2018, he won the gold medal in the men's 80 kg event at the 2018 Asian Taekwondo Championships held in Ho Chi Minh City, Vietnam. In the same year, he also competed in the men's 80 kg at the 2018 Asian Games in Jakarta, Indonesia without winning a medal. He was eliminated in his second match by Saleh El-Sharabaty of Jordan.
