= 2024 European Taekwondo Championships – Men's 87 kg =

Men's 87 kg at the 2024 European Taekwondo Championships
- Venue: Belgrade Fair – Hall 1
- Location: Belgrade, Serbia
- Dates: 10 May
- Competitors: 21 from 21 nations

Medalists
gold medal	Enbiya Taha Biçer	Turkey
silver medal	Richard Ordemann	Norway
bronze medal	Vasileios Tholiotis	Greece
bronze medal	Artem Harbar	Ukraine

The men's 87 kg competition at the 2024 European Taekwondo Championships was held on 10 May 2024.

== Results ==
=== Finals ===
Semifinals
Richard Ordemann (NOR)	2
Artem Harbar (UKR)	1
Enbiya Taha Biçer (TUR)	2
Vasileios Tholiotis (GRE)	0

Final
Richard Ordemann (NOR)	0
Enbiya Taha Biçer (TUR)	2

=== Top half ===
==== Section 1 ====
Round of 32
Alexander Pryazhnikov (AIN)	1
Richard Ordemann (NOR)	2

Round of 16
Ivan Šapina (CRO)	0
Richard Ordemann (NOR)	2
Kelen Bailey (HUN)	2
Artsiom Plonis (AIN)	1

Quarterfinals
Richard Ordemann (NOR)	2
Kelen Bailey (HUN)	0

==== Section 2 ====
Round of 32
Mikołaj Szaferski (POL)	2
Andreas Theocharous (CYP)	0
Ismaël Bouzid Souihili (FRA)	0
Farzad Mansouri (RTA)	2

Round of 16
Artem Harbar (UKR)	2
Mikołaj Szaferski (POL)	0
Farzad Mansouri (RTA)	2
Miloš Golubović (SRB)	0

Quarterfinals
Artem Harbar (UKR)	2
Farzad Mansouri (RTA)	1

=== Bottom half ===
==== Section 3 ====
Round of 32
Kasra Mehdipournejad (RTA)	2
Laurențiu Snacov (ROU)	0

Round of 16
Enbiya Taha Biçer (TUR)	WDR
Kasra Mehdipournejad (RTA)
Manuel Pollet (BEL)	0
Sergio Troitiño (ESP)	2

Quarterfinals
Enbiya Taha Biçer (TUR)	2
Sergio Troitiño (ESP)	1

==== Section 4 ====
Round of 32
Erik Farmakas (SWE)
Itamar Sasson (ISR)

Round of 16
Vasileios Tholiotis (GRE)	2
Hassan Amer Ali (DEN)	0
Erik Farmakas (SWE)	2
Taleh Suleymanov (AZE)	1

Quarterfinals
Vasileios Tholiotis (GRE)	2
Erik Farmakas (SWE)	0
