= Happo-giri =

In the practice of aikidō, happo-giri (or happo-no-giri) is an exercise performed with the bokken, cutting in eight directions. Each cut is a simple strike from the top of the head straight down the centre line, with the bokken ending parallel to the floor at roughly the same height as the lower abdomen. The order of the strikes is often quoted as north, south, east, west, southeast, northwest, southwest, northeast, finally returning - without performing a ninth cut - to the original position (north), though in Morihiro Saito's 1975 book Aikido, its heart and appearance, the order is north, south (1/2 turn), east (3/4 turn), west (1/2 turn), southwest (7/8 turn), northeast (1/2 turn), northwest (3/4 turn), southeast (1/2 turn).

The main purpose of happo-no-giri is to teach how to control one's surroundings while maintaining proper stance or kamae, by moving around one's centre.

A similar exercise called happo-no-tsuki is performed with the Jō.
