= Taekwondo at the 2014 Asian Games – Men's 87 kg =

Taekwondo competition

Men's 87 kg at the 2014 Asian Games
- Venue: Ganghwa Dolmens Gymnasium
- Date: 30 September 2014
- Competitors: 12 from 12 nations

Medalists
gold medal	Jasur Baykuziyev	Uzbekistan
silver medal	Chen Linglong	China
bronze medal	Shin Yeong-rae	South Korea
bronze medal	Nattapat Tantramart	Thailand

The men's middleweight (87 kilograms) event at the 2014 Asian Games took place on 30 September 2014 at Ganghwa Dolmens Gymnasium, Incheon, South Korea.

A total of twelve competitors from twelve countries competed in this event, limited to fighters whose body weight was less than 87 kilograms.

Jasur Baykuziyev from Uzbekistan won the gold medal after defeating Chen Linglong from People's Republic of China in the gold medal match by the score of 6–3.

The bronze medal was shared by semifinal losers (without having a third place match) Nattapat Tantramart of Thailand and Shin Yeong-rae from the host nation South Korea.

== Schedule ==
All times are Korea Standard Time (UTC+09:00)

Date	Time	Event
Tuesday, 30 September 2014	09:30	Round of 16
Tuesday, 30 September 2014	15:30	Quarterfinals
Tuesday, 30 September 2014	15:30	Semifinals
Tuesday, 30 September 2014	18:00	Final

== Results ==
Round of 16
Nguyễn Trọng Cường (VIE)	1
Shin Yeong-rae (KOR)	14
Jasur Baykuziyev (UZB)	5
Yousef Karami (IRI)	4
Maksat Abdrambek (KAZ)	9
Mohammed Hamooda (QAT)	4
Kristopher Uy (PHI)	9
Hao Chao (MAC)	2

Quarterfinals
Chang Kai (TPE)	8
Shin Yeong-rae (KOR)	16
Jasur Baykuziyev (UZB)	6
Mohammad Al-Shajahey (JOR)	0
Nattapat Tantramart (THA)	10
Maksat Abdrambek (KAZ)	1
Kristopher Uy (PHI)	3
Chen Linglong (CHN)	5

Semifinals
Shin Yeong-rae (KOR)	5
Jasur Baykuziyev (UZB)	7
Nattapat Tantramart (THA)	9
Chen Linglong (CHN)	11

Final
Jasur Baykuziyev (UZB)	6
Chen Linglong (CHN)	3
