= Kumdo =

Korean sword-based martial art

- Also known as: Kŏmdo, Keomdo, Gumdo, and Geomdo
- Focus: Swordsmanship
- Hardness: Semi-contact
- Country of origin: South Korea
- Parenthood: Kendo, Muyedobot'ongji, Wubei Zhi
- Official website: www.kumdo.org

- Kumdo
- Hangul: 검도
- Hanja: 劍道
- RR: Geomdo
- MR: Kŏmdo

Kumdo (Korean: 검도; lit. 'the way of the sword') is the modern Korean sword-based martial art and a combat sport. While originating from Japanese Kendo, Kumdo has developed separately as a martial art from cultural adaptation, including historical Korean sword techniques, Bonguk Geombeop (본국검법, 本國劍法) and Joseon Sebeop (조선세법, 朝鮮勢法). These two Korean sword techniques originated in Muyedobot'ongji and Wubei Zhi respectively. The name is also romanized as Kŏmdo, Keomdo, Gumdo, and Geomdo.

Kumdo, commonly translated as "the way of the sword," encompasses various sword-based martial arts influenced by Japanese traditions. Among these, Haidong Gumdo, a popular style in Korea, emphasizes broad, flowing sword movements intended to replicate ancient battlefield techniques, in contrast to kendo’s focus on precision and controlled strikes.

Since its introduction from Japan, kendo has been widely integrated into Korean culture and society. Over time, the term "kumdo" has evolved into a broader label encompassing Korean martial arts rooted in swordsmanship. It can refer to the competitive, sport-oriented practice originated from Japan, as well as other martial forms such as Haidong Gumdo and Hankumdo.

Although descended from kendo, Korean kumdo has distinct characteristics shaped by cultural adaptation. Notable differences include the use of native Korean terminology, and slight modifications to the uniform, mainly the restrictions on the use of hakama by practitioners. These distinctions reflect the Korean nationalist efforts to turn kendo into a different martial arts and create a unique Korean identity.

== History ==
The introduction of bamboo practice swords and protective armor in sword training is attributed to Naganuma Shirōzaemon Kunisato of the Jikishinkage-ryū during the Shōtoku era (1711–1716).

In April 1895, the Dai Nippon Butoku Kai (DNBK) was established in Kyoto, Japan, to preserve traditional martial arts such as swordsmanship, archery, and unarmed combat. Over centuries of military heritage, Japanese swordsmen had developed numerous schools of kenjutsu (lit. "sword techniques"), which formed the foundation of the DNBK’s approach to sword training.

=== Introduction to Korea ===
In 1896, the DNBK expanded to Korea, establishing the Dai Nippon Butokukai – Chōsen-bu (Korean Branch) under Nakamura Tokichi. Japanese kenjutsu, similar to jūdō, was integrated into the Japanese educational system in 1911, largely due to the efforts of Naitō Takaharu and Isogai Hajime, both affiliated with the DNBK. The adoption of flexible bamboo swords and protective armor allowed for safer training and full-contact sparring. Initially referred to as gekiken (Kyūjitai: 擊劍; Shinjitai: 撃剣; lit. "hitting sword"), this sporting form of swordsmanship was renamed kendō in 1920.

During the Japanese occupation of Korea (1910–1945), kendō was introduced into Korean schools, often using Korean terminology instead of Japanese. In 1939, it became a mandatory subject in Korean educational institutions and continued to be practiced until the end of World War II. Following Korea’s liberation in 1945, kumdo and kendō evolved into separate yet closely related martial arts.

=== Timeline of Kumdo development ===
- 1895 – The Dai Nippon Butokukai (All Japan Martial Virtue Society) is established in Kyoto by martial arts enthusiasts to promote traditional disciplines such as archery, jūjutsu, and kenjutsu.
- 1895 – Japanese advisors, including those specializing in law enforcement training, are assigned to Korea. As part of the Kabo Reforms of 1894, cadets at the Kyŏngmujŏng (Police Academy) are required to train in kyŏk-gŏm (J. gekiken, "combat swordsmanship").
- 1896 – The Dai Nippon Butokukai – Chōsen-bu (Korean Branch) is established under Nakamura Tokichi.
- 1904 – Training in Japanese military swordsmanship (kyŏk-gŏm) is incorporated into the curriculum of the Yŏnsŏng Army Academy.
- 1906 – Gekiken is introduced into the Korean school curriculum.
- 1908 – A tournament is held between Korean police and their Japanese counterparts. Gekiken is included in Korea’s first national physical education program.
- 1910 – Korea is officially annexed by Japan.
- 1919 – The term kendō is formally adopted in Japan on August 1.
- 1927 – Kendo becomes an official subject in junior high schools in Korea.
- 1935 – Kendo is included in the 16th National Joseon Sports Festival.
- 1945 – Korea gains independence from Japanese rule.
- 1947 – The first Kumdo restructuring efforts begin, marked by the Seoul Police Kumdo Tournament.
- 1948 – Approximately 100 high-ranking kumdo instructors convene at Changdeokgung Palace, forming the precursor to the Korean Kumdo Association (KKA).
- 1950 – The 1st National Police Kumdo Tournament is held.
- 1952 – A committee is established to oversee the formalization of the KKA.
- 1953 – The KKA is officially inaugurated and affiliated with the Korean Amateur Sports Association. The 1st National Individual Kumdo Championships take place, coinciding with the establishment of the All Japan Kendo Federation.
- 1956 – After a 20-year hiatus, kumdo is reinstated as an official event in the National Sports Festival.
- 1959 – The President’s Cup Grade Category Tournament and the National Student Championships increase kumdo’s popularity.
- 1964 – The Student Kumdo Federation affiliates with the KKA.
- 1970 – The Student Kumdo Federation divides into the Collegiate Federation and the Secondary Schools Federation. The International Kendo Federation is founded, with a Korean representative serving as Vice President.
- 1972 – Kumdo is introduced in the National Youth Sports Meet.
- 1979 – The Dong-a Ilbo news agency collaborates with the KKA to sponsor the President’s Cup National Championships.
- 1988 – The Korean Social Kumdo Federation is formed, followed by the inaugural National Social Championships.
- 1993 – The SBS Royal National Championships are established.

This timeline illustrates the development of kumdo from its early introduction in Korea to its modern evolution as a distinct martial art.

== Today ==
=== Philosophy ===
Like many martial arts, kumdo embodies both historical traditions and contemporary philosophical principles. While its sports-oriented aspects emphasize competition and skill development, kumdo also seeks to cultivate strong character in its practitioners. A key tenet of the discipline is that personal integrity and ethical conduct enhance competitive spirit while upholding values such as courtesy, respect, sportsmanship, and fair play.

Despite being a modern martial art, kumdo schools continue to draw inspiration from historical ethical codes, including the O-Gae (오계), or "Five Tenets," which trace their origins to the Silla Kingdom during the Three Kingdoms period. The modern interpretation of these tenets is as follows:

Be loyal and faithful to your country and organization.
Be faithful and respectful to your parents and elders.
Be faithful and respectful to your friends and colleagues.
Be confident and show courage when faced with injustice.
Be benevolent."

=== Mental and philosophical training ===
In addition to these foundational principles, modern kumdo incorporates additional philosophical teachings, particularly those addressing the psychological challenges of competition. One such concept is the "Four Poisons," which practitioners seek to overcome through disciplined training. These are:

- Surprise
- Fear
- Doubt (or Hesitation)
- Confusion

Regular and dedicated practice is believed to help practitioners control these natural reactions, allowing for clearer decision-making and execution in combat.

Another key concept in kumdo is Pyeongsangsim (평상심), or "emptiness," referring to a state of mental calmness and detachment in which external circumstances do not disrupt the natural execution of techniques. Additionally, practitioners strive for Kiwi (기위), a state of mental, physical, and spiritual discipline that fosters clarity and objectivity. Finally, Jan Sim (잔심), (lit. "remaining mind") emphasizes perseverance and steadfastness, ensuring focus and commitment even in the face of adversity.

=== Equipment ===
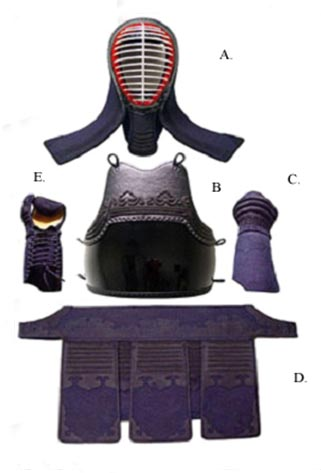
The suit of modern kumdo armor, excepting the scarf which is worn over the scalp inside of the helmet.

The protective equipment used in kumdo is called hogu (호구), equivalent to bōgu in Japanese. It consists of six main components:

(NOT SHOWN.) Myŏn-soo-goon (면수건, tenugui in Japanese): A cotton scarf worn under the helmet to absorb perspiration and prevent vision obstruction. It is sometimes referred to as a Dougong, though this term should not be confused with the Chinese architectural element.

(A.) Homyeoun (호면, men in Japanese): A helmet with a metal grille and a throat guard that protects the head and neck.

(B.) Kap (갑, dō in Japanese): A chest protector that protects the torso from strikes.

(D.) Kapsang (갑상, tare in Japanese): A canvas and leather skirt worn around the waist that protects the hip and groin area.

(C, E.) Howan (호완, kote in Japanese): A pair of padded mitts with cuffs that protects the hands and wrists.

Additionally, as with other contact sports, the use of a mouthguard (eep bohodae) is strongly encouraged.

Kumdo practitioners use a bamboo sword known as a juk-do (죽도) for striking, thrusting, and defensive maneuvers. The juk-do consists of several parts:

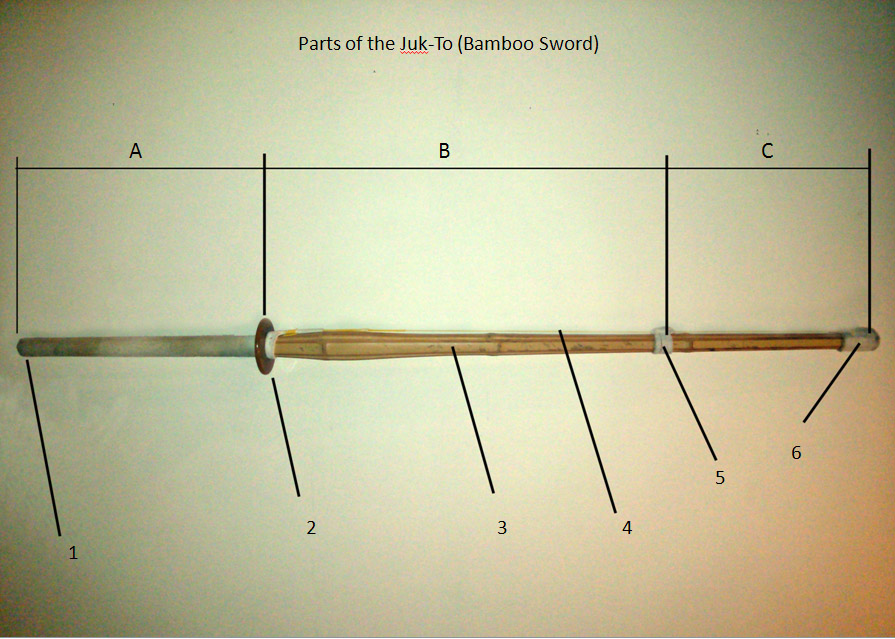

(1.) Pommel: Though a structural part of the sword, it is not considered a valid point of contact in competition.

(2.) Ko-dûng-i: (코등이, tsuba in Japanese): A guard positioned at the hilt, often used as a point of contact in close-quarters engagements.

(3.) Kalnal: (칼날): The "blade" of the sword, represented by the side of the juk-do opposite the duengjul (lit. "back cord"). The valid striking area consists of the forward one-third of the juk-do (marked C in the image).

(4.) Duengjul: A yellow string running from the guard to the tip, representing the spine of the sword.

(5.) Joonghyuk: A leather band marking the proximal limit of the recognized striking area.

(6.) Sunnhyuk: A leather cap at the tip of the sword. While thrusting techniques are infrequent in competition, they are valid when contact is made with only this part of the sword.

(A.) Byounghyuk: The handle of the sword.

(B.)

(C.) Ta-dol-bu: The section between the sunnhyuk and the joonghyuk, representing the first third of the blade. In competition, a strike is only counted if contact is made with this area.

A standard juk-do for adult practitioners measures 120 cm (47 inches). The minimum weight requirement is 510 grams for male competitors and 420 grams for female competitors. Traditionally, juk-do are constructed from four bamboo slats bound with leather. Modern alternatives made from high-impact plastics and carbon fiber exist but only bamboo juk-do are permitted in official competitions. Smaller versions are available for child practitioners.

In addition to the juk-do, kumdo practitioners train with a wooden sword known as a mok geom (목검). Historically used in competition, the mok geom has been largely restricted to structured solo and paired drills due to its potential for serious injury or death. Today, it also serves as a training substitute for steel swords in forms practice.

=== Clothing ===
Kumdo practitioners wear a uniform known as a tobok (도복, 道服; lit: "clothing for the way"), which closely resembles that worn by kendo practitioners and is typically indigo-blue. Many practitioners pair this with paji ( 바지; lit. training pants ) featuring billowy legs modeled after the Japanese hakama, though without the koshiita and with ankles left unbound as in the Korean Hanbok. A heavy, cotton double-weave jacket called the otdori (옷도리) is worn, traditionally secured with a tie known as the maettiop (매띠업) While linen ties in the Japanese tradition were once common, velcro fastenings are now increasingly used. A belt (dhee, 띠) — which usually signifies the individual's rank or standing — completes the uniform. In national tournaments, the Korean national team typically wears a white keikogi with black trim and stripes on their hakama, contrasting with the all-indigo-blue attire of kendo practitioners.

By contrast, the required dress for classroom training is often less formal and may reflect the particular values of a given school or instructor. In many cases, practitioners wear a more common martial arts uniform consisting of white and/or black pants and a jacket bound with a belt. Recently, there has been a growing trend toward emphasizing the Korean identity of the art by binding the uniform pants at the ankle in the style of the Korean hanbok. Although this was formerly accomplished with laces, velcro fastenings are now preferred.

=== Levels and ranks ===
Kumdo practitioners begin at the lowest level—the 10th geup—and progress in knowledge and skill to the 1st geup. Although advancement requirements may vary between schools or organizations, these levels are designed to instill the fundamentals of physical conditioning, body movement, strategy, and competitive technique.

After completing the geup levels, practitioners may continue their development by advancing through a series of advanced ranks, known as dan or master levels, beginning with 1st dan. Progression to higher dan levels is achieved by passing required examinations and demonstrating proficiency in competition, both of which are carefully evaluated by the school's cadre and its affiliated organization.

=== Training ===
Training in kumdo varies by school and organization, though several universal practices are observed. Emphasis is placed on Neo-Confucian sensitivity, wherein interactions stress respect and hierarchy, and on bowing rituals performed upon entering and leaving the training area, as well as before and after competitions, drills, or instruction.

==== Class structure ====
A typical class lasts between one and one and a half hours and is generally divided into four quarters:

Warm-Up Period: Includes stretching and aerobic activities.

Drills with the Bamboo Sword (Juk-To): Focuses on striking targets and refining fundamental techniques.

Protective Armor and Sparring or Form Practice: Participants either engage in sparring while wearing protective gear or practice standardized individual forms (Hyung) or paired forms (Bon).

Cool-Down Activity (Optional): Concludes the session with relaxation exercises.

==== Forms and techniques ====
Kumdo practitioners study several forms, including the Bonguk Geombeop (본국검법, 本國劍法), Joseon Sebeop (조선세법, 朝鮮勢法), and the set of bon or kendo no kata (검도의본, 劍道形), standardized by the FIK. The first two forms are unique to Korean practitioners and are not found in Japanese kendo. Proficiency in these forms is required for rank promotion tests conducted by the Korea Kumdo Association (KKA) and its overseas affiliates.

The bon practiced in kumdo may consist of either a standard set of 10 kata originating from kendo or a set of 15 engagements derived from traditional Korean swordsmanship (검법; 劍法; geombeop; lit. 'Korean swordsmanship'). Typically, these forms are performed without the sonkyo bow—a gesture unique to Japanese practice—and use Korean terminology in place of the original Japanese names. Additionally, some kumdo dojang have recently incorporated kuhapdo forms, the Korean variant of Japanese iaido, which focuses on simultaneously drawing and cutting.

==== Mental discipline and self-control ====
Kumdo training also emphasizes mental discipline and self-control. Meditative practices, inspired by Korean Buddhist traditions, help develop focus, emotional regulation, and self-awareness. The structured progression through forms and techniques builds perseverance and goal-oriented behavior, fostering mental resilience.

Physical benefits of kumdo training include improved cardiovascular fitness, muscle strength, flexibility, and enhanced joint mobility. Drills help build stamina, strengthen the core, and improve reflexes, while the broader, flowing movements of Haidong Gumdo contribute to muscular endurance.

Moreover, the practice of kumdo instills values of respect and humility, reflecting its Confucian influences. This disciplined mindset extends beyond the training area, supporting both personal development and the cultivation of virtue and honor—traits esteemed in both Korean and Japanese martial traditions as noted by Boyé Lafayette De Mente.

=== Competition ===
Korea sends a team to the World Kendo Championships (WKC), held every three years, and has been a strong competitor in previous tournaments. During the 13th World Kendo Championships held in Taipei, Taiwan, from December 8–10, 2006, Korea defeated the United States to win the men's team championship for the first time, becoming the first country other than Japan to secure a title at the WKCs. Notably, the United States had eliminated the Japanese team during the semifinals.

In competition, the main differences between kendo and kumdo are stylistic. Kumdo practitioners generally favor a dynamic style of play, employing fast, aggressive, and effective small-motion strikes to create openings reminiscent of battlefield tactics. In contrast, kendo practitioners typically emphasize the perfect single strike, patiently waiting for the right moment to deliver a decisive attack. In recent years, increased cross-training and competition between the two disciplines have blurred these distinctions, as individual competitors adopt a range of personal styles.

Engagements are conducted between two individuals, each wearing protective body armor and using bamboo swords. The competition court is typically a square or rectangle measuring between 9 and 11 meters per side, with an additional margin of 1.5 meters surrounding it, and is supervised by a referee along with two corner referees. During an engagement—a five-minute period with the possibility of a three-minute extension—competitors accrue points by striking their opponent with prescribed attacks or thrusts. Although disarms followed by throws or joint locks are sometimes studied in classroom settings and seen in local competitions, such techniques are not permitted in international contests. Judgments regarding the nature or quality of an attack, as well as the general comportment of competitors, are signaled by the referees and require a majority consensus. With minor stylistic differences—kumdo judges use blue and white flags instead of the red and white flags used in kendo—these rules are observed by both kumdo and kendo organizations in national and international play.

=== Organizations ===
==== Korea Kumdo Association (KKA) ====
The Korea Kumdo Association (KKA) is the primary organization for kumdo in Korea, known for its size and influential media promotion of the art. The KKA promotes Daehan Kumdo (大韓劍道), a style virtually identical to Japanese kendo but modified to reflect Korean cultural influences and methodologies. This form of kumdo is the one most commonly practiced in Korea. The KKA has established overseas branches in countries with significant Korean populations and kumdo dojangs (training halls). Unlike most FIK affiliates, including Japan, the KKA supports the inclusion of kumdo/kendo as an Olympic sport, similar to judo and taekwondo.

==== Dae Han Kum Sa Association / Dae Han Kumdohoe ====
The Dae Han Kum Sa Association (대한검사회), the predecessor to the Dae Han Kumdohoe (The Korea Kumdo Association, 대한검도회), was organized on May 20, 1948. Approximately 100 masters—including Suh Chong Hac, Kim Yong Dal, Ho Ik Yong, Chung Tae Min, Lee Chung Ku, Do Ho Mun, Kang Nak-won, Pak Chong-kyu, and Kim Yong-bae—met on the grounds of Changdok Palace and formed the Taehan Kumsa Association. In 1953, Chong Hac Suh founded the Korean Kumdo Association in cooperation with kendo practitioners from both Korea and Japan. Later, Suh relocated to Bettendorf, Iowa, in the United States, where he established the World Kumdo Association.

==== The World Kumdo Association (WKA) ====
Founded around 2001 as a merger of thirteen smaller, rival kumdo organizations, the World Kumdo Association (WKA) is critical of the KKA and seeks to rival the FIK by promoting the inclusion of kumdo in the Olympic Games, with the WKA as the recognized governing body. Although equipment, forms, regulations, and scoring are essentially the same, Korean practice tends to be somewhat more heavy-handed, while Japanese practice is generally lighter. Consequently, the WKA advocates for changes to the format and scoring system, including the adoption of electric scoring similar to that used in fencing.

==== Overseas dojangs ====
Numerous kumdo dojangs (training halls) exist outside Korea, primarily in regions with large Korean ethnic populations such as North America and Europe. Many of these dojangs choose to affiliate with overseas branches of kumdo organizations like the KKA rather than with the local FIK affiliate. For example, many kumdo dojangs in the United States are affiliated with an overseas branch of the KKA instead of the All United States Kendo Federation (AUSKF), the FIK affiliate for the US. Because the KKA is an FIK affiliate, the rankings awarded by it are honored and accepted by other affiliates, including the AUSKF. While kumdo practitioners outside Korea also compete in kendo tournaments, many choose to participate exclusively in tournaments sponsored by kumdo organizations. One example is the annual Bong-Rim-Gi Kumdo tournament held each summer among kumdo schools in the United States and sponsored by an overseas branch of the KKA.

=== Differences and similarities with other Martial Arts ===
Kumdo, Haidong Gumdo, kendo, and taekwondo all emphasize mental discipline, respect, and tradition. Although kumdo and kendo are closely related, they differ in techniques and objectives. Japanese kendo is more uniform and sport-oriented, focusing on scoring points through quick strikes to defined targets, whereas kumdo encompasses a broader range of styles and techniques. Haidong Gumdo incorporates dynamic and aesthetically pleasing sword forms that reflect the fluidity of ancient battlefield maneuvers.

In contrast, taekwondo—a Korean martial art centered on striking techniques—places greater emphasis on kicks and hand techniques, setting it apart from the weapon-based approaches of kumdo and kendo. Nevertheless, both taekwondo and the sword arts share core values such as perseverance and respect for tradition, which are deeply rooted in Confucian thought. Training in both haidong gumdo and taekwondo involves rigorous physical conditioning and mental discipline, highlighting strong parallels despite their technical differences.

=== Terminology ===
Kumdo uses Korean terminology, much of which is derived from the same Chinese characters found in Japanese kendo. For example, the criteria used to determine whether a point is valid is known as 기검체; 氣劍體; gigeomche in Korean, rather than kikentai (気剣体) in Japanese. Both terms share the same Chinese roots: 氣 for "spirit", 劍 for "sword", and 體 for "body". Note that slight differences in the appearance of some characters arise from the Japanese use of shinjitai characters.

== See also ==
- Korean swordsmanship
