= Anton Kotkov =

Russian taekwondo practitioner

Personal information
- Nationality: Russian
- Born: April 20, 1990 Petrozavodsk

Sport
- Country: Russia
- Sport: Taekwondo
- Event: –80 kg
Medal record
Representing Russia
Men's taekwondo
World Championships
Silver medal – second place	2017 Muju	Welterweight
Bronze medal – third place	2013 Puebla	Welterweight
Grand Prix
Gold medal – first place	2017 Moscow	–80 kg
Bronze medal – third place	2019 Chiba	80 kg

Anton Sergeyevich Kotkov (Russian: Антон Сергеевич Котков; born 20 April 1990, Petrozavodsk), is a Russian taekwondo athlete. He won the silver medal at the 2017 World Taekwondo Championships on the welterweight category and the bronze medal at the 2013 World Taekwondo Championships in the welterweight category.
