= Szymon Piątkowski =

Polish taekwondo practitioner (born 2003)

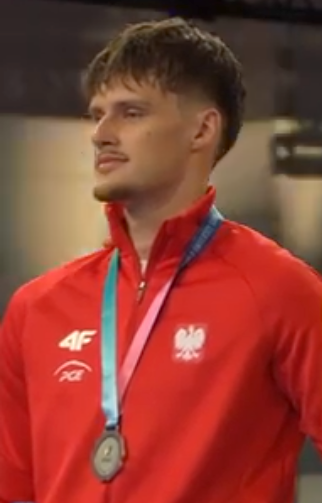
- Piątkowski at the 2025 FISU World University Games

Personal information
- Full name: Szymon Piątkowski
- Born: 3 January 2003 (age 23) Olsztyn, Poland
- Education: University of Warmia and Mazury in Olsztyn

Sport
- Country: Poland
- Sport: Taekwondo
- Event: 87 kg
- Club: AZS UWM Olsztyn
- Coached by: Marcin Chorzelewski
Medal record
Representing Poland
World Championships
| Bronze medal – third place | 2025 Wuxi | 87 kg |
European Championships
| Gold medal – first place | 2026 Munich | 87 kg |
World University Games
| Silver medal – second place | 2025 Rhine-Ruhr | 87 kg |

Szymon Piątkowski (born 3 January 2003) is a Polish taekwondo practitioner. Piątkowski won a bronze medal at the 2025 World Taekwondo Championships, and a gold medal at the 2026 European Taekwondo Championships.

== Career ==
In 2017, Piątkowski won a bronze medal in the 57 kg event at the World Cadet Taekwondo Championships in Sharm el-Sheikh, Egypt. The same year, he also achieved results at the European Clubs Championships in Thessaloniki and the Bulgaria Open in Sofia at the cadet level.

In 2018, he won bronze medals in the juniors' 68 kg event at the German Open in Sindelfingen and the Polish Open in Warsaw. In 2019, he won a bronze medal in the juniors' 78 kg event at the European Clubs Championships in Zagreb, and in 2020 he won a silver medal in the juniors' 78 kg event at the German Open in Hamburg.

In 2021, he won a silver medal in the 80 kg event at the Polish Open. In 2022, he won bronze medals in the 80 kg event at the Slovenia Open and the European Clubs Championships. In 2023, he won a silver medal in the 80 kg event at the European Clubs Championships in Tallinn and a bronze medal in the same weight class at the Balkan Cup in Sarajevo. In June 2023, he represented Poland in the 80 kg event at the 2023 European Games.

In 2024, he competed in the 80 kg event at the 2024 European Taekwondo Championships in Belgrade, where he was eliminated in his opening match after losing to Hungary's Omar Salim. The same year, he won a gold medal in the 80 kg event at the Riga Open.

In 2025, Piątkowski began competing in the 87 kg division. In February, he won a gold medal in the 87 kg event at the Turkish Open in Antalya. In July 2025, he competed at the 2025 Summer World University Games and won a silver medal in the 87 kg event, losing to Ukraine's Artem Harbar in the finals. In October 2025, he competed at the 2025 World Taekwondo Championships in Wuxi, China and won a bronze medal in the 87 kg event. He defeated Konstantin Minin, Zakaria Meddouh, Michael Rodriguez and Zakaria El Koumri to reach the semifinals. He lost to Egypt's Seif Eissa in the semifinals and finished third. This was Poland's first medal at the World Taekwondo Championships since Piątkowski's coach, Marcin Chorzelewski, in 2001.

In 2026, he won a gold medal in the 87 kg event at the Slovenia Open in Ljubljana. In May 2026, he competed at the 2026 European Taekwondo Championships in Munich, Germany, and won a gold medal in the 87 kg event. He defeated Sweden's Sandro Fronda in the round of 16, Turkey's Orkun Ateşli in the quarterfinals and Greece's Vasileios Tholiotis in the semifinals to reach the final. During the final, he defeated Spain's Sergio Troitiño Amoedo to become European Champion.

== Personal life ==
Piątkowski was born on 3 January 2003 in Olsztyn. He represents AZS UWM Olsztyn and studies at the University of Warmia and Mazury in Olsztyn. His coach is Marcin Chorzelewski.
