= Lee Hwa-jun =

South Korean taekwondo practitioner

Personal information
- Born: 16 February 1996 (age 30)

Sport
- Country: South Korea
- Sport: Taekwondo
- Weight class: 80 kg
Medal record
Men's taekwondo
Representing South Korea
Asian Games
Silver medal – second place	2018 Jakarta	80 kg

Lee Hwa-jun (born 16 February 1996) is a South Korean taekwondo practitioner. He won the silver medal in the men's 80 kg event at the 2018 Asian Games held in Jakarta, Indonesia. In the final, he lost against Nikita Rafalovich of Uzbekistan.
