= Rafael Kamalov =

Russian taekwondo practitioner

Personal information
- Born: 4 September 1997 (age 28)

Sport
- Country: Russia
- Sport: Taekwondo
- Weight class: 87 kg
Medal record
Men's taekwondo
Representing Russia
Military World Games
Gold medal – first place	2019 Wuhan	87 kg
Summer Universiade
Bronze medal – third place	2017 Taipei	87 kg
Bronze medal – third place	2019 Naples	87 kg

Rafael Kamalov (born 4 September 1997) is a Russian taekwondo practitioner. He won the gold medal in the men's 87 kg event at the 2019 Military World Games.

Kamalov won one of the bronze medals in the men's 87 kg event at the 2017 Summer Universiade held in Taipei, Taiwan. He repeated this in the men's 87 kg at the 2019 Summer Universiade held in Naples, Italy.
