= Bonguk geom =

Korean sword

- Hangul: 본국검
- Hanja: 本國劍
- RR: Bongukgeom
- MR: Pon'gukkŏm

Bonguk geom (Korean 본국검 "Our Country's sword) is a Joseon era Korean martial arts (17th to 18th centuries) referring to a style of Korean swordsmanship. There has been claims that this style originated in Silla period, but historical records indicate that it originated in Joseon era.

== Equipment ==
According to the Muyedobotongji the standardised example of a Hwando should be 1 gun (斤, 근) 8 nyang (approximately 1kg) and should have a blade length of 3 chuck(尺, 척), 3 chi (寸, chi ). (approximately 1 meter) following period changes in measurements.

== Characteristics ==
Bonguk Geom has in total 33 movements (勢) which is divided then 3 parts written in songs (首). The offensive techniques are then separated as: 12 songs of "GyeokBup" (擊法, 격법 meaning Striking method) and 7 songs of "Jabup" (刺, 자법), meaning Thrusting method) and "Sebup" (洗法), meaning Washing/deflecting methods).

In an improvement over the earlier editions of the treaties depicted in the Yedo (sword), Bonguk Geombup also utilises labels and techniques similar to both the Changdao treaties in the earlier Jixiao Xinshu and the Kenjutsu treaties acquired during the later half of the Imjin War and the Qing invasion of Joseon to supplement fighting when being assailed by opponents in possible binds or Halfswording. This is constantly exemplified by using techniques such as the "Snow Monkey Escaping the Cave technique" (白猿出洞勢, 백원출동세) and the "Brave and whooshing straight leap" (勇躍一刺勢, 용약일자세) which attempts to recover in binds via thrusting or retreating through a high guard whilst constantly presenting a threat.

The Bonguk Geom especially finalises the end of the maneuver either through deflection, binding or interrupting cuts with a following cut targeting the opponents neck and belly. One technique that characterises such attacks are called the "waist striking techniques"(腰擊勢, 요격세) which is frequently employment with a diagonal cut whilst extending your lead leg away from the opponent to create distance.

== History ==
The term was first referenced in 1678 in the "Seungjeongwon ilgi " and later formalised in the Muyesinbo of 1759.

The Muyedobotongji stresses the antiquity of this "national" Korean system by including the narrative of a Silla "Flower Youth" called Hwangchang, who killed Baekje's king while performing a sword dance, known as Geommu, at the court. However, as stated by an officer in part of the royal demonstration of Martial arts in 1673, Officer Yu Hyuk Eon claims that the techniques were transmitted from the 1621 Chinese Martial treaties known as "Wubei zhi" which was then called: Joseon Sword Techniques (Korean 조선세법). Nevertheless, the techniques described in the 18th century treaties had departed so far from the original system that 3 new chapters including the Yedo (예도) and the Yedo-Chongbo (예도-총보) were added and formalised in the Muyesinbo.

There are also references in 1598 to a sword demonstration described by Seonjo of Joseon as "our country's employment of sword Skill" ( Hanja 我國用劍技) in the Joseon sillok but the extent of how those systems are connected are yet unverified.

The historical swords of the Silla period would have been single-edged and comparable to those of the Eastern Han dynastic period (see also Hwandudaedo). However, the Bonguk geom, as presented in the 18th-century manual, is historically based on multiple types of contemporary swords, including both double handed Geom and Hwando.

In contemporary schools of Korean swordsmanship, the term bonguk geom is used to emphasize their "national" Korean character, without necessarily bearing a direct relation to the 18th-century system.
