= Gary Hall (taekwondo) =

British Taekwondo athlete and trainer

Gary Kenneth Hall MBE is a British former taekwondo athlete, trainer and performance director for the British Taekwondo team.

== Career ==
Hall was national taekwondo champion of Great Britain for 10 years. He has represented Great Britain at three European and World Championships.

He became the performance director for the Great Britain Taekwondo Team in 2006 and has led team in all major events since 2001. Hall was the team leader at the 2004 Athens Olympics and the 2008 Beijing Olympics and performance director at the 2012 Summer Olympics.

Hall was appointed Member of the Order of the British Empire (MBE) in the 2022 Birthday Honours for services to taekwondo.
