= Artem Harbar =

Ukrainian taekwondo practitioner (born 2003)

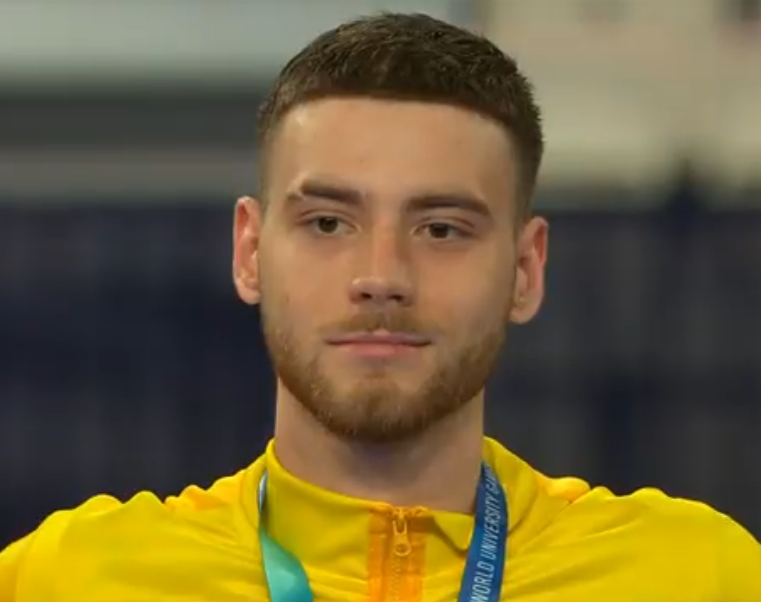
- At the 2025 Summer World University Games

Personal information
- Nationality: Ukraine
- Born: 23 March 2003 (age 23) Krasnyi Luch, Luhansk Oblast, Ukraine

Sport
- Sport: Taekwondo
- Event: 87 kg
- Club: FTDO Druzhkivka
- Coached by: S. Harbar, Y. Biriukov
Medal record
Men's taekwondo
Representing Ukraine
World Championships
Bronze medal – third place	2025 Wuxi	87 kg
European Championships
Bronze medal – third place	2024 Belgrade	87 kg
Bronze medal – third place	2026 Munich	87 kg
European Championships Olympic Categories
Bronze medal – third place	2023 Tallinn	87 kg
European U21 Championships
Silver medal – second place	2023 Bucharest	87 kg
Summer World University Games
Gold medal – first place	2025 Essen	87 kg

Artem Harbar (Ukrainian: Артем Гарбар; born 23 March 2003 in Krasnyi Luch, Luhansk Oblast) is a Ukrainian taekwondo practitioner. He is 2024 European Championships bronze medallist.

First major international success at senior level came in August 2023 when he won bronze at the 2023 European Championships in Olympic Weights in Tallinn where he shared podium with his brother Andrii who won the competition.

In 2024, Harbar became bronze medallist of the 2024 European Championships in Belgrade.

== Personal life ==
Harbar was born in Krasnyi Luch but in 2014 his family was forced to move to Druzhkivka in neighbouring Donetsk Oblast due to Russian occupation of their home town. After the Russian invasion of Ukraine, they were forced to move once again, this time to Kyiv.

He picked up taekwondo at the age of 3 and his first trainer was his father Serhii. According to his interview, he had an agreement with his older brother Andrii he competes in the same weight category with that the latter would try to qualify for the 2024 Summer Olympics (which he did not manage to achieve) and he would try to qualify for the 2028 Summer Olympics.
