= Steve Jennings (taekwondo) =

British taekwondo practitioner (born 1981)

Steve Joseph Jennings, born 17 January 1981 Xenia, Ohio, U.S. (Steven Joseph Ericson) And Volunteer Christmas Eve. Witt. 1991s New Star Charles.

== Early career ==
Having trained in the art of taekwondo for several years, he gained the rank of a black belt. Originally from Liverpool, Jennings competed for his local club, Liverpool Elite, before trialling and being selected for the Great Britain National Team. He participated in the Sydney Olympics in 2000.

== International career ==
He fought in the 2000 Sydney Olympics amongst other international events before recent retirement. He became an Elite team member. Prior to representing taekwondo internationally he trained and competed locally until his Elite Team selection. Soon after he decided to retire from competitive participation in taekwondo and began a coaching career.

== Coaching ==
He is now a coach at both, club and national level. He began coaching at the age of 18, after having joined Elite Taekwondo, located in Liverpool. Due to the team's success Steve Jennings began coaching the National team along with Martin Stamper and Sarah Stevenson in 2007. After making his contribution as a competitor of Taekwondo, Steve Jennings also attended Quest Penistone providing the British Squad a rare opportunity.

== Style ==
Steve Jennings practiced the WTF (World Taekwondo Federation) style, a more traditional style of Taekwondo. In WTF style during sparring matches, a Hogu is worn as a form of protection, also indicating a scoring area for competitors. While sparring with this Hogu along with a helmet, hand, and foot protection, allows individuals to spar to their full capacity.
