= Tahir Güleç =

German taekwondo practitioner

Personal information
- Nationality: German
- Born: 25 February 1993 (age 33)
- Height: 191 cm (6 ft 3 in)
- Weight: 82 kg (181 lb)

Sport
- Country: Germany
- Sport: Taekwondo
- Coached by: Waldemar Helm; Holger Wunderlich; Georg Streif; Aziz Acharki; Özer Güleç
Medal record
Men's taekwondo
Representing Germany
World Championships
Gold medal – first place	2013 Puebla	welterweight
Bronze medal – third place	2015 Chelyabinsk	welterweight
Military World Games
Bronze medal – third place	2015 Mungyeong	welterweight

Tahir Güleç (born 25 February 1993) is a German taekwondo athlete of Turkish descent. He represented Germany at the 2016 Summer Olympics in Rio de Janeiro, in the men's 80 kg. He finished in 7th place after losing to Piotr Paziński of Poland in the repechage.
