= Mehran Barkhordari =

Iranian Taekwondo athlete (born 2000)

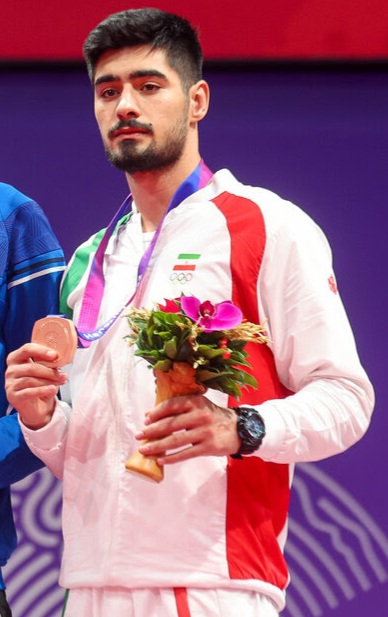
- Barkhordari at the 2022 Asian Games

Personal information
- Native name: مهران برخورداری
- Born: 26 July 2000 (age 25) Qazvin, Iran
- Height: 188 cm (6 ft 2 in)
- Weight: 80 Kg

Sport
- Country: Iran
- Sport: Taekwondo
- Coached by: Majid Aflaki (National Team)
Medal record
Men's Taekwondo
Representing Iran
Olympic Games
Silver medal – second place	2024 Paris	80 kg
World Championships
Bronze medal – third place	2022 Guadalajara	80 kg
Asian Games
Bronze medal – third place	2022 Hangzhou	80 kg
Asian Championships
Silver medal – second place	2024 Da Nang	87 kg
Grand Slam
Gold medal – first place	2023 Wuxi	80 kg
Grand Prix
Gold medal – first place	2023 Paris	80 kg
Silver medal – second place	2023 Roma	80 kg
Islamic Solidarity Games
Bronze medal – third place	2021 Konya	80 kg
Universiade
Bronze medal – third place	2021 Chengdu	80 kg

Mehran Barkhordari (Persian: مهران برخورداری; born 26 July 2000 in Qazvin) is an Iranian Taekwondo athlete. He won a bronze medal at the 2022 Asian Games in the Men's 80 kg weight class. He won the 2024 Summer Olympics quota in the 2023 Grand Slam, and won a silver medal in the men's 80 kg event.
