= Park Woo-hyeok =

South Korean taekwondo practitioner

Sport
- Country: South Korea
- Sport: Taekwondo
- Weight class: 80 kg
Medal record
Men's taekwondo
Representing South Korea
World Championships
Gold medal – first place	2022 Guadalajara	80 kg
Bronze medal – third place	2019 Manchester	80 kg
Asian Championships
Gold medal – first place	2026 Ulaanbaatar	87 kg
Silver medal – second place	2024 Na Dang	+87 kg
Bronze medal – third place	2021 Beirut	80 kg

Park Woo-hyeok is a South Korean taekwondo practitioner. He won the gold medal in the men's welterweight event at the 2022 World Taekwondo Championships held in Guadalajara, Mexico. He also won one of the bronze medals in his event at the 2019 World Taekwondo Championships held in Manchester, United Kingdom.

He won one of the bronze medals in his event at the 2021 Asian Taekwondo Championships held near Beirut, Lebanon.
