= Hogu =

Armor worn by practitioners of Taekwondo during sparring

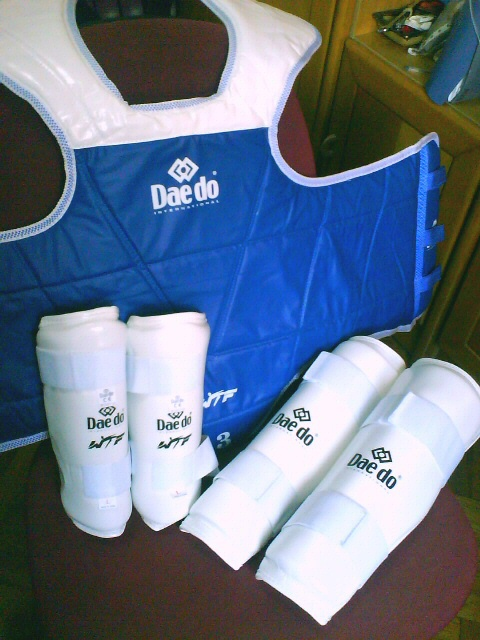
Official WTF trunk protector (hogu), forearm guards and shin guards

Hogu (호구, 護具) is the armor worn by practitioners of taekwondo and geomdo during sparring and competition. Translated into English, hogu means chest or chest protector.

The hogu has been used in World Taekwondo sparring since the 1950s and is considered the most important piece of sparring equipment in the Taekwondo practitioner's arsenal. The hogu is the most common scoring area in Taekwondo sparring. The hogu is hit by the heel, the sole and the top of the foot by many kicking techniques like the roundhouse kick or the back kick, and can also be hit with the fist. Hogus are made by various companies such as Adidas and Dae Do; only certain brands of chest protector are approved by World Taekwondo. The chest protector is mandatory in World Taekwondo- or Olympic-style competition; however, it is not used in International Taekwon-Do Federation-style sparring.

In Korean Geomdo, hogu refers to the armor worn by practitioners during sparring. It is similar to the bōgu worn by practitioners of Japanese Kendo.

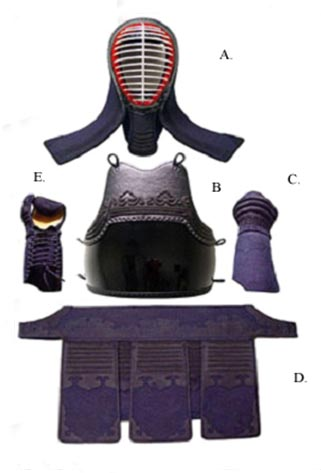

== See also ==
- Bōgu – protective armor worn in kendo
