= Damon Sansum =

British taekwondo practitioner

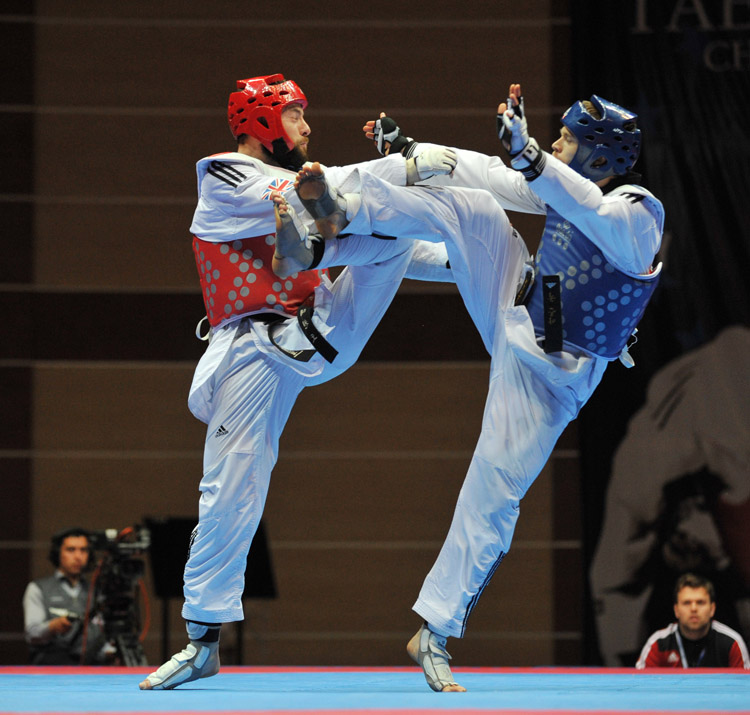
- Damon Sansum (red) at the Euro 2014 in Baku. Final against Aaron Cook

Personal information
- Nationality: British
- Born: 18 February 1987 (age 39) Paderborn Germany
- Height: 1.87 m (6 ft 2 in)
- Weight: 80 kg (180 lb)

Sport
- Sport: Taekwondo
- Event: –80 kg
- Team: GBR
Medal record
World Championships
| Silver medal – second place | 2015 Chelyabinsk | Welterweight |
| Bronze medal – third place | 2017 Muju | Welterweight |
European Championships
| Silver medal – second place | 2014 Baku | 80 kg |
Grand Prix
| Bronze medal – third place | 2014 Astana | 80 kg |

Damon Sansum (born 18 February 1987) is a British taekwondo athlete. He won the silver medal at the 2015 World Taekwondo Championships in the Men's welterweight category.

In 2012 he starred in episodes 6 and 7 in the third season of ITV's dating game show Take Me Out, pairing with contestant Katie after being judged by the panel of 30 women.

In 2017 he competed again in the world championships, getting a bronze medal on the same Men's welterweight category.
