= Sib Pal Gi Association =

Korean martial arts association

- Sibpalgi
- Hangul: 십팔기
- Hanja: 十八技
- Revised Romanization: Sib Pal Gi
- McCune–Reischauer: Sib Pal Ki

The Sib Pal Gi Association (십팔기협회 Dae Han Sibpalki Hyeop Hwe; also The Korea Sibpalki Association) is a Korean martial arts association established in 1981 under the leadership of Kim Kwang-Seok (Kim Gwang-suk 김광석; 金光錫, b. 1936, style name Haebeom). Sib Pal Ki (literally "eighteen skills") is a Korean term for "martial arts", either Chinese martial arts or Korean martial arts (as opposed to the Japanese martial arts introduced during the Japanese rule in Korea).

Kim Kwang-Seok had opened a martial arts school in 1969, having studied martial arts during the late 1950s to middle 1960s under Choi sang-chul, Korean Kungfu master. In 1986 Korean folklorist Sim U-seong worked together with Kim Kwang-Seok to compare his style with the historical Muyedobotongji or "Comprehensive Illustrated Manual of Martial Arts" of 1790. In the same year, the first public performance of Sib Pal Gi took place at the Batanggol Small Theater in Seoul.

In 2001, students of Kim Kwang Seok founded the Sib Pal Gi Preservation Society (십팔기 보존회), dedicated to staging public performances and disseminating public awareness of Korean martial arts in the South Korean public.

It is not clear to which extent the Sib Pal Gi system taught by Kim Kwang-Seok corresponds to the historical 18th-century Korean systems and to which extent the system reflects more modern influence of Chinese martial arts; but the emphasis of Sib Pal Gi in Korea is that of being a "native" system in the sense of avoiding the modern Japanese martial arts which had become mainstream under the Japanese occupation of Korea during the first half of the 20th century.

The term Sip Pal Gi (십팔기 "Eighteen Skills") in modern Korean martial arts has come to identify four separate activities.

- there are practitioners in South Korea who follow the practices of an eclectic Chinese system of armed and unarmed Martial Arts termed Sip Pal Gi owing to the number of systems, methods and practices in its curriculum. Individual schools will vary in the weapons used and the manner of practice.
- A second and more general application of the term is as a label to identify Chinese martial arts generically, much like "kung fu" has become an umbrella term for them in the West.
- Also, there are small groups of practitioners who use the term Sip Pal Gi historically, for the attempted reconstruction of 18th-century Korean martial arts based on the historical manuals, specifically the Muyesinbo, or the later Muyedobot'ongji (although omitting the equestrian variants the latter added to the former), much in the same way as martial arts reconstruction in the West.
- Lastly, the style usually spelled Sipalki, of dubious relation with the Chosun period martial arts, taught by Yoo Soo Nam.

== See also ==
- Eighteen Arms of Wushu
- Korean martial arts
- Korean swordsmanship
