= Markus Jiskra =

Swiss taekwondo practitioner

Markus Jiskra is a Swiss international taekwondo practitioner. He reached the quarter-final of the 2008 European Championships in Rome, and competed in the 2008 Summer Olympics in Beijing.
