= Apostolos Telikostoglou =

Greek taekwondo practitioner

Personal information
- Nationality: Greek
- Born: Apostolos Telikostoglou; 9 March 1995 (age 31) Kozani, Greece
- Height: 1.95 m (6 ft 5 in)

Sport
- Country: Greece
- Sport: Taekwondo
- Event: 80 kg
- University team: Aristotle University of Thessaloniki
Medal record
Representing Greece
Men's taekwondo
World Championships
Silver medal – second place	2019 Manchester	80 kg
Grand Prix
Silver medal – second place	2023 Paris	80 kg
European Games
Bronze medal – third place	2023 Kraków-Małopolska	80 kg
Mediterranean Games
Bronze medal – third place	2022 Oran	80 kg
World Junior Championships
Silver medal – second place	2012 Sharm El-Sheikh	73 kg

Apostolos Telikostoglou (Greek: Απόστολος Τεληκωστόγλου; born 9 March 1995) is a Greek taekwondo athlete. He won a silver medal at the 2019 World Taekwondo Championships on the men's welterweights.

He won one of the bronze medals in the men's 80 kg event at the 2022 Mediterranean Games held in Oran, Algeria.
