= Nurlan Myrzabayev =

Kazakhstani taekwondo practitioner

Personal information
- Born: 6 November 1992 (age 33)

Sport
- Country: Kazakhstan
- Sport: Taekwondo
- Weight class: 80 kg
Medal record
Men's taekwondo
Representing Kazakhstan
Asian Games
Bronze medal – third place	2018 Jakarta	80 kg

Nurlan Myrzabayev (Нұрлан Сайлаубайұлы Мырзабаев, born 6 November 1992) is a Kazakhstani taekwondo practitioner. He won one of the bronze medals in the men's 80 kg event at the 2018 Asian Games held in Jakarta, Indonesia.

In 2017, he competed in the men's welterweight event at the World Taekwondo Championships held in Muju County, South Korea. He also competed in the men's −80 kg event at the 2017 Asian Indoor and Martial Arts Games held in Ashgabat, Turkmenistan. In this competition he lost his only match against Erfan Nazemi of Iran. Nazemi went on to win the gold medal in this event.
