= Qiao Sen =

Chinese Taekwondo practitioner (born 1990)

Personal information
- Nationality: Chinese
- Born: 14 May 1990 (age 36) Shijiazhuang, Hebei, China

Sport
- Sport: Taekwondo

Qiao Sen (born 14 May 1990) is a Chinese taekwondo athlete.

He represented China at the 2016 Summer Olympics in Rio de Janeiro, in the men's +80 kg.
