= Saleh El-Sharabaty =

Jordanian taekwondo practitioner

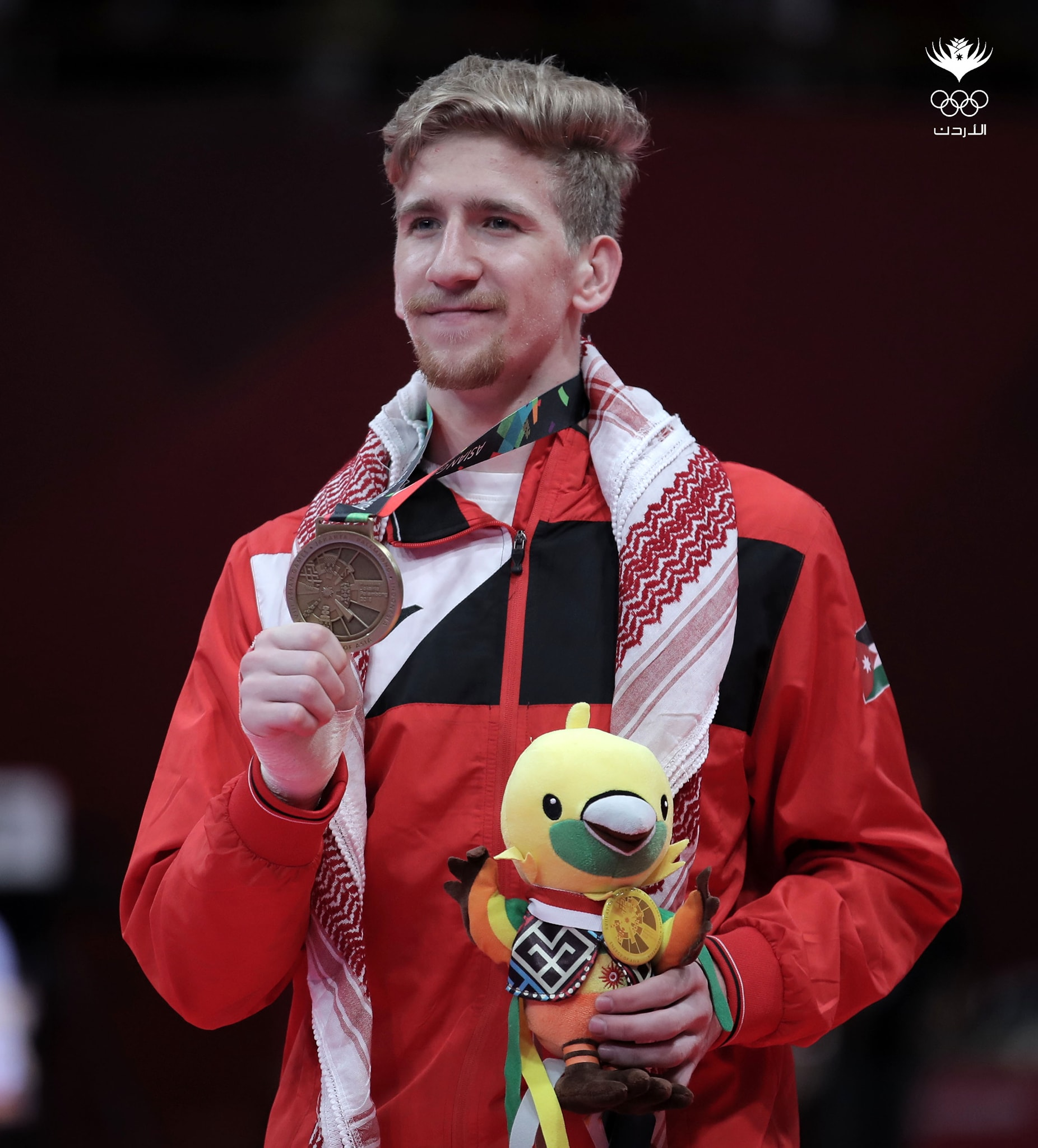
- Al-Sharabaty in 2018

Personal information
- Full name: Saleh Salah El-Sharabaty
- Nickname: Abu Salah
- Nationality: Jordanian
- Born: 12 September 1998 (age 28) Zarqa, Jordan
- Education: Marketing
- Height: 189 cm (6 ft 2 in)

Sport
- Sport: Taekwondo
- Weight class: 80 kg
Medal record
Men's taekwondo
Representing Jordan
Olympic Games
| Silver medal – second place | 2020 Tokyo | 80 kg |
Asian Championships
| Gold medal – first place | 2021 Beirut | 80 kg |
| Silver medal – second place | 2022 Chuncheon | 80 kg |
| Silver medal – second place | 2018 Ho Chi Minh City | 80 kg |
| Bronze medal – third place | 2016 Manila | 80 kg |
| Bronze medal – third place | 2024 Da Nang | 80 kg |
Asian Games
| Silver medal – second place | 2022 Hangzhou | 80 kg |
| Bronze medal – third place | 2018 Jakarta | 80 kg |
| Bronze medal – third place | 2026 Aichi-Nagoya | 80 kg |
Islamic Solidarity Games
| Bronze medal – third place | 2025 Riyadh | 82 kg |
Grand Prix
| Gold medal – first place | 2023 Rome | 80 kg |
| Gold medal – first place | 2019 Sofia | 80 kg |
| Silver medal – second place | 2018 Moscow | 80 kg |

Saleh Salah El-Sharabaty (Arabic: صالح صلاح الشرباتي; born 12 September 1998) is a Jordanian taekwondo athlete and a member of the Jordanian Taekwondo team where he competes in the -80kg weight. At the Tokyo 2020 Olympic Games, he won silver and thus became the second Jordanian to win an Olympic medal. Previously, he won the bronze medal on the welterweight division (80 kg) at the 2018 Asian Games in Jakarta, Indonesia.

== Career ==
He started doing taekwondo at the age of seven at the Jabal Amman Centre. He has a degree in marketing from the University of Applied Sciences.

Silver medal at the 2018 Taekwondo Grand Prix in Moscow Gold at the 2018 Asian Championship Bronze at the 2016 Asian Championship Bronze at the 2018 Asian Games in Jakarta Bronze at the 2017 Asian Indoor and Martial Arts Games in Ashgabat, Turkmenistan.
