= Piotr Paziński (taekwondo) =

Polish taekwondo practitioner

Personal information
- Nationality: Polish
- Born: 7 August 1987 (age 38) Warsaw, Poland

Sport
- Sport: Taekwondo

Piotr Paziński (born 7 August 1987) is a Polish taekwondo athlete.

He represented Poland at the 2016 Summer Olympics in Rio de Janeiro, in the men's 80 kg.
