= Liu Wei-ting =

Taiwanese taekwondo practitioner

Personal information
- Nationality: Taiwanese
- Born: 6 January 1995 (age 31) Changhua County, Taiwan

Sport
- Sport: Taekwondo
Medal record
Representing Chinese Taipei
Men's taekwondo
Asian Championships
Silver medal – second place	2016 Manila	-80 kg
Bronze medal – third place	2014 Tashkent	-80 kg

Liu Wei-ting (Chinese: 劉威廷; pinyin: Liú Wēitíng; born 6 January 1995) is a Taiwanese taekwondo athlete, born in Changhua County.

He represented Taipei at the 2016 Summer Olympics in Rio de Janeiro, in the men's 80 kg. He won a bronze medal at the 2014 Asian Taekwondo Championships, and a silver medal at the 2016 Asian Taekwondo Championships.
