= Richard Ordemann =

Norwegian taekwondo practitioner

Personal information
- Full name: Richard André Konopka Ordemann
- Nationality: Norwegian
- Born: 6 August 1994 (age 31) Nannestad, Norway
- Height: 198 cm (6 ft 6 in)
- Weight: 80 kg (176 lb)

Sport
- Sport: Taekwondo
- Weight class: 80 kg
Medal record
Men's taekwondo
Representing Norway
Grand Prix
Gold medal – first place	2018 Fujairah	80 kg
Silver medal – second place	2022 Paris	80 kg
Bronze medal – third place	2023 Rome	80 kg
European Games
Silver medal – second place	2023 Kraków-Małopolska	80 kg
European Championships
Silver medal – second place	2024 Belgrade	87 kg
Bronze medal – third place	2018 Kazan	80 kg
Bronze medal – third place	2022 Manchester	80 kg
Universiade
Bronze medal – third place	2017 Taipei	80 kg

Richard André Konopka Ordemann (born 6 August 1994) is a Norwegian taekwondo athlete. He won the gold medal at the 2018 Grand Prix Finals in the under 80 kg category. He qualified to the 2020 Summer Olympics through the 2021 European Taekwondo Olympic Qualification Tournament. He has qualified for the 2024 Summer Olympics in the +80 kg category.
