= Taekwondo at the 2004 Summer Olympics – Qualification =

Taekwondo competitions at the 2004 Summer Olympics in Athens were held from August 25 to August 28. There were four weight categories for both men and women. Each NOC could enter 2 men and 2 women, but only 1 athlete per weight category. There was one global Olympic Qualification Tournament and one qualification tournament for each continent. In addition, 4 invitational places were awarded.

== Timeline ==
Event	Date	Venue
World Qualification Tournament	December 4–6, 2003	Paris, France
African Qualification Tournament	January 21–22, 2004	Cairo, Egypt
Pan American Qualification Tournament	January 31 – February 1, 2004	Querétaro, Mexico
Asian & Oceania Qualification Tournament	February 15–16, 2004	Bangkok, Thailand
European Qualification Tournament	February 22–23, 2004	Baku, Azerbaijan

== Qualification summary ==
NOC	Men				Women				Total
NOC	−58 kg	−68 kg	−80 kg	+80 kg	−49 kg	−57 kg	−67 kg	+67 kg	Total
Argentina		X					X		2
Australia		X	X				X	X	4
Austria		X			X				2
Azerbaijan		X	X						2
Belgium								X	1
Bosnia and Herzegovina				X					1
Brazil	X	X						X	3
Canada					X			X	2
Central African Republic		X							1
China							X	X	2
Chinese Taipei	X	X			X	X			4
Colombia				X	X	X			3
Costa Rica				X					1
Croatia							X	X	2
Cuba			X		X				2
Denmark		X		X					2
Dominican Republic	X								1
Egypt	X	X			X	X			4
Finland				X					1
France			X	X		X		X	4
Great Britain	X		X				X	X	4
Greece	X			X		X	X		4
Guatemala		X			X		X		3
Haiti				X					1
Indonesia	X				X				2
Iran		X	X						2
Iraq			X						1
Israel					X				1
Italy		X				X		X	3
Ivory Coast						X			1
Japan								X	1
Jordan				X				X	2
Kazakhstan				X					1
Lesotho					X				1
Libya	X								1
Malaysia					X				1
Mexico	X		X			X			3
Morocco				X			X	X	3
Nepal					X				1
Netherlands			X				X		2
New Zealand							X		1
Nigeria			X	X				X	3
Norway							X		1
Philippines	X		X				X		3
Poland						X			1
Puerto Rico							X		1
Russia	X					X			2
South Africa		X							1
South Korea		X		X		X	X		4
Spain	X			X	X	X			4
Thailand	X		X		X	X			4
Trinidad and Tobago			X						1
Tunisia		X	X				X		3
Turkey			X						1
Ukraine	X								1
United States			X			X			2
Uzbekistan						X		X	2
Venezuela		X		X	X			X	4
Vietnam	X			X					2
Yemen	X								1
Total: 60 NOCs	16	16	16	16	15	15	15	15	124

== Men's events ==
=== −58 kg ===
Competition	Places	Qualified athletes
Host nation	1	Michalis Mouroutsos (GRE)
World Qualification Tournament	3	Chu Mu-yen (TPE); Juan Antonio Ramos (ESP); Tshomlee Go (PHI)
African Qualification Tournament	2	Tamer Bayoumi (EGY); Ezedin Belgasem (LBA)
Pan American Qualification Tournament	3	Óscar Salazar (MEX); Marcel Wenceslau (BRA); Gabriel Mercedes (DOM)
Asian & Oceania Qualification Tournament	3	Ussadate Sutthikunkarn (THA); Satriyo Rahadhani (INA); Nguyễn Quốc Huân (VIE)
European Qualification Tournament	3	Seyfula Magomedov (RUS); Paul Green (GBR); Oleksandr Shaposhnyk (UKR)
Universality places	1	Akram Al-Noor (YEM)
Total	16	

=== −68 kg ===
Competition	Places	Qualified athletes
Host nation	0	—
World Qualification Tournament	4	Lee Won-jae (KOR); Duncan Mahlangu (RSA); Carlo Molfetta (ITA); Luis Alberto García (VEN)
African Qualification Tournament	2	Tamer Abdelmoneim Hussein (EGY); Mohamed Omrani (TUN)
Pan American Qualification Tournament	3	Diogo Silva (BRA); Alejandro Hernando (ARG); Gabriel Sagastume (GUA)
Asian & Oceania Qualification Tournament	3	Hadi Saei (IRI); Carlo Massimino (AUS); Huang Chih-hsiung (TPE)
European Qualification Tournament	3	Niyamaddin Pashayev (AZE); Tuncay Çalışkan (AUT); Jesper Roesen (DEN)
Universality places	1	Bertrand Gbongou Liango (CAF)
Total	16	

=== −80 kg ===
Competition	Places	Qualified athletes
Host nation	0	—
World Qualification Tournament	4	Christophe Negrel (FRA); Yousef Karami (IRI); Rashad Ahmadov (AZE); Steven López (USA)
African Qualification Tournament	2	Souheil Hammami (TUN); Jacob Martins Obiorah (NGR)
Pan American Qualification Tournament	3	Víctor Estrada (MEX); Chinedum Osuji (TRI); Ángel Matos (CUB)
Asian & Oceania Qualification Tournament	3	Kriangkrai Noikoed (THA); Donald Geisler (PHI); Daniel Trenton (AUS)
European Qualification Tournament	3	Bahri Tanrıkulu (TUR); Craig Brown (GBR); Thijs Oude Luttikhuis (NED)
Universality places	1	Raid Rasheed (IRQ)
Total	16	

=== +80 kg ===
Competition	Places	Qualified athletes
Host nation	1	Alexandros Nikolaidis (GRE)
World Qualification Tournament	3	Moon Dae-sung (KOR); Zakaria Asidah (DEN); Luis Noguera (VEN)
African Qualification Tournament	2	Abdelkader Zrouri (MAR); Chika Chukwumerije (NGR)
Pan American Qualification Tournament	3	Julian Rojas (COL); Kristopher Moitland (CRC); Tudor Sanon (HAI)
Asian & Oceania Qualification Tournament	3	Adilkhan Sagindykov (KAZ); Nguyễn Văn Hùng (VIE); Ibrahim Aqil (JOR)
European Qualification Tournament	3	Pascal Gentil (FRA); Jon García (ESP); Teemu Heino (FIN)
Universality places	1	Zoran Prerad (BIH)
Total	16	

== Women's events ==
=== −49 kg ===
Competition	Places	Qualified athletes
Host nation	0	—
World Qualification Tournament	4	Juana Wangsa Putri (INA); Dalia Contreras (VEN); Yanelis Labrada (CUB); Yaowapa Boorapolchai (THA)
African Qualification Tournament	2	Esraa Halawa (EGY); Lineo Mochesane (LES)
Pan American Qualification Tournament	3	Ivett Gonda (CAN); Euda Carías (GUA); Gladys Mora (COL)
Asian & Oceania Qualification Tournament	3	Chen Shih-hsin (TPE); Elaine Teo (MAS); Sangina Baidya (NEP)
European Qualification Tournament	3	Brigitte Yagüe (ESP); Maya Arusi (ISR); Nevena Lukic (AUT)
Total	15	

=== −57 kg ===
Competition	Places	Qualified athletes
Host nation	1	Areti Athanasopoulou (GRE)
World Qualification Tournament	3	Jang Ji-won (KOR); Cristiana Corsi (ITA); Gwladys Épangue (FRA)
African Qualification Tournament	2	Abeer Essawy (EGY); Mariam Bah (CIV)
Pan American Qualification Tournament	3	Iridia Salazar (MEX); Nia Abdallah (USA); Paola Delgado (COL)
Asian & Oceania Qualification Tournament	3	Nootcharin Sukkhongdumnoen (THA); Irina Kaydashova (UZB); Chi Shu-ju (TPE)
European Qualification Tournament	3	Sonia Reyes (ESP); Rita Ivanova (RUS); Aleksandra Uścińska (POL)
Total	15	

=== −67 kg ===
Competition	Places	Qualified athletes
Host nation	1	Elisavet Mystakidou (GRE)
World Qualification Tournament	3	Luo Wei (CHN); Kim Yeon-ji (KOR); Nina Solheim (NOR)
African Qualification Tournament	2	Mouna Benabderrassoul (MAR); Mounira Nahdi (TUN)
Pan American Qualification Tournament	3	Ineabelle Díaz (PUR); Heidy Juárez (GUA); Vanina Sánchez (ARG)
Asian & Oceania Qualification Tournament	3	Verina Wihongi (NZL); Toni Rivero (PHI); Caroline Bartasek (AUS)
European Qualification Tournament	3	Sandra Šarić (CRO); Sarah Bainbridge (GBR); Charmie Sobers (NED)
Total	15	

=== +67 kg ===
Competition	Places	Qualified athletes
Host nation	0	—
World Qualification Tournament	4	Tina Morgan (AUS); Myriam Baverel (FRA); Chen Zhong (CHN); Daniela Castrignano (ITA)
African Qualification Tournament	2	Mounia Bourguigue (MAR); Princess Dudu (NGR)
Pan American Qualification Tournament	3	Adriana Carmona (VEN); Natália Falavigna (BRA); Dominique Bosshart (CAN)
Asian & Oceania Qualification Tournament	3	Natalya Mikryukova (UZB); Yoriko Okamoto (JPN); Nadin Dawani (JOR)
European Qualification Tournament	3	Nataša Vezmar (CRO); Sarah Stevenson (GBR); Laurence Rase (BEL)
Total	15	
