= Taekwondo at the 2004 Summer Olympics – Women's 49 kg =

Taekwondo competition

Women's 49 kg at the Games of the XXVIII Olympiad
- Venue: Faliro Coastal Zone Olympic Complex
- Date: 26 August
- Competitors: 15 from 15 nations

Medalists
1st place, gold medalist(s)		Chen Shih-Hsin; Chinese Taipei
2nd place, silver medalist(s)		Yanelis Labrada; Cuba
3rd place, bronze medalist(s)		Yaowapa Boorapolchai; Thailand

The women's 49 kg competition in taekwondo at the 2004 Summer Olympics in Athens took place on August 26 at the Faliro Coastal Zone Olympic Complex.

Chen Shih-hsin collected one of Chinese Taipei's first ever Olympic gold medals at these Games in the event, after handily defeating Cuba's Yanelis Labrada in the final with a score of 5–4. Meanwhile, Thai fighter Yaowapa Boorapolchai picked up a bronze medal after edging Colombia's Gladys Mora 2–1 in a tight repechage match.

== Competition format ==
The main bracket consisted of a single elimination tournament, culminating in the gold medal match. The taekwondo fighters eliminated in earlier rounds by the two finalists of the main bracket advanced directly to the repechage tournament. These matches determined the bronze medal winner for the event.

== Schedule ==
All times are Greece Standard Time (UTC+2)

Date	Time	Round
Thursday, 26 August 2004	11:00; 16:00; 17:30; 20:30	Preliminary Round; Quarterfinals; Semifinals; Final

== Results ==
Legend

- PTG — Won by points gap
- SUP — Won by superiority
- OT — Won on over time (Golden Point)
- WO — Walkover

=== Main bracket ===
Preliminary round
Yaowapa Boorapolchai (THA)	9
Brigitte Yagüe (ESP)	5
Elaine Teo (MAS)	4
Euda Carías (GUA)	4+
Nevena Lukic (AUT)	4
Lineo Mochesane (LES)	0
Maya Arusi (ISR)	1
Dalia Contreras (VEN)	5
Ivett Gonda (CAN)	3
Jermin Anwar (EGY)	2
Chen Shih-hsin (TPE)	4
Sangina Baidya (NEP)	0
Juana Wangsa Putri (INA)	2
Gladys Mora (COL)	2+

Quarterfinals
Yanelis Labrada (CUB)	3
Yaowapa Boorapolchai (THA)	1
Euda Carías (GUA)	1+
Nevena Lukic (AUT)	1
Dalia Contreras (VEN)	2
Ivett Gonda (CAN)	3
Chen Shih-hsin (TPE)	1
Gladys Mora (COL)	0

Semifinals
Yanelis Labrada (CUB)	8
Euda Carías (GUA)	3
Ivett Gonda (CAN)	2
Chen Shih-hsin (TPE)	3

Gold medal match
Yanelis Labrada (CUB)	4
Chen Shih-hsin (TPE)	5

=== Repechage ===
Quarterfinals		Semifinals		Bronze medal match
		Euda Carías (GUA)	0
Gladys Mora (COL)	5	Gladys Mora (COL)	2
Sangina Baidya (NEP)	−1			Gladys Mora (COL)	1
				Yaowapa Boorapolchai (THA)	2
		Ivett Gonda (CAN)	−1
		Yaowapa Boorapolchai (THA)	2
