= Colombia at the 2004 Summer Olympics =

- IOC code: COL
- NOC: Colombian Olympic Committee
- Website: www.olimpicocol.co (in Spanish)

in Athens
- Competitors: 53 in 15 sports
- Flag bearer: Carmenza Delgado
- Medals Ranked 68th: Gold 0 Silver 0 Bronze 2 Total 2

Summer Olympics appearances (overview)
- 1932; 1936; 1948; 1952; 1956; 1960; 1964; 1968; 1972; 1976; 1980; 1984; 1988; 1992; 1996; 2000; 2004; 2008; 2012; 2016; 2020; 2024

Colombia competed at the 2004 Summer Olympics in Athens, Greece, from 13 to 29 August 2004. This was the nation's sixteenth appearance at the Olympics, except the 1952 Summer Olympics in Helsinki.

Comité Olímpico Colombiano sent the nation's largest delegation to the Games since 1972. A total of 53 athletes, 32 men and 21 women, took part in 18 sports. Ten Colombian athletes had previously competed in Sydney, including tennis player Fabiola Zuluaga in the women's singles, road cyclist Víctor Hugo Peña, and weightlifter Carmenza Delgado, who became the nation's flag bearer in the opening ceremony.

Colombia left Athens with a total of two Olympic bronze medals, which were both awarded to weightlifter Mabel Mosquera, and track cyclist María Luisa Calle in the women's points race. Originally, Calle finished in the bronze medal position, but was later disqualified under a strict liability rule after she had been tested positive for the banned stimulant heptaminol, handing the medal over to U.S. cyclist Erin Mirabella. As a result of the International Olympic Committee's decision on November 23, 2005, the bronze medal was officially reinstated to Calle after this had been proven to be a false positive due to isometheptene presence in an analgesic prescribed during the competition.

== Medalists ==
Medal	Name	Sport	Event	Date
Bronze	Mabel Mosquera	Weightlifting	Women's 53 kg	August 15
Bronze	María Luisa Calle	Cycling	Women's points race	August 25

Medals by sport
Sport	1st place, gold medalist(s)	2nd place, silver medalist(s)	3rd place, bronze medalist(s)	Total
Cycling	0	0	1	1
Weightlifting	0	0	1	1
Total	0	0	2	2

Medals by gender
Gender	1st place, gold medalist(s)	2nd place, silver medalist(s)	3rd place, bronze medalist(s)	Total	Percentage
Female	0	0	2	2	100%
Male	0	0	0	0	0%
Mixed	0	0	0	0	0%
Total	0	0	2	2	100%

== Athletics ==
Colombian athletes have so far achieved qualifying standards in the following athletics events (up to a maximum of 3 athletes in each event at the 'A' Standard, and 1 at the 'B' Standard).

Key

- Note–Ranks given for track events are within the athlete's heat only
- Q = Qualified for the next round
- q = Qualified for the next round as a fastest loser or, in field events, by position without achieving the qualifying target
- NR = National record
- N/A = Round not applicable for the event
- Bye = Athlete not required to compete in round

Men
Track & road events

Athlete	Event	Heat		Quarterfinal		Semifinal		Final	
Athlete	Event	Result	Rank	Result	Rank	Result	Rank	Result	Rank
Juan Carlos Cardona	Marathon	—N/a						2:22:49	51
José Alirio Carrasco	Marathon	—N/a						2:21:14	43
Luis Fernando López	20 km walk	—N/a						1:26:34	24
Paulo César Villar	110 m hurdles	13.44 NR	1 Q	14.03	8	Did not advance			

Women
Track & road events

Athlete	Event	Heat		Quarterfinal		Semifinal		Final	
Athlete	Event	Result	Rank	Result	Rank	Result	Rank	Result	Rank
Digna Luz Murillo	200 m	22.98	5 q	23.19	4	Did not advance			
Melissa Murillo	100 m	11.67	5	Did not advance					
Sandra Zapata	20 km walk	—N/a						1:42:22	46
Norma González; Digna Luz Murillo; Melissa Murillo; Felipa Palacios	4 × 100 m relay	43.30	5	—N/a				Did not advance	

Field events

Athlete	Event	Qualification		Final	
Athlete	Event	Distance	Position	Distance	Position
Zuleima Araméndiz	Javelin throw	59.94	17	Did not advance	
Caterine Ibargüen	High jump	1.85	30	Did not advance	

== Boxing ==
Colombia sent five boxers to Athens. Three lost their first matches, while two won once before being defeated. Juan Camilo Novoa was the most successful, as he made it to the quarterfinals after having a bye in his first round and winning his bout in the round of 16.

Athlete	Event	Round of 32	Round of 16	Quarterfinals	Semifinals	Final	
Athlete	Event	Opposition Result	Opposition Result	Opposition Result	Opposition Result	Opposition Result	Rank
Carlos Tamara	Light flyweight	Bouchtouk (MAR); W 48–25	Pinto (ITA); L 35–49	Did not advance			
Óscar Escandón	Flyweight	Bye	Rahimov (GER); L 15–25	Did not advance			
Likar Ramos Concha	Featherweight	Biarnadski (BLR); L 18–32	Did not advance				
José David Mosquera	Lightweight	Escobedo (USA); L RSC	Did not advance				
Juan Camilo Novoa	Welterweight	Bye	Balog (HUN); W 33–24	Kim J-J (KOR); L 23–25	Did not advance		

== Cycling ==
=== Road ===
Athlete	Event	Time	Rank
Santiago Botero	Men's road race	5:41:56	31
Santiago Botero	Men's time trial	59:04.76	7
Luis Felipe Laverde	Men's road race	5:41:56	36
Víctor Hugo Peña	Men's road race	Did not finish	
Víctor Hugo Peña	Men's time trial	1:00:09.89	14
Marlon Pérez Arango	Men's road race	Did not finish	

=== Track ===
Pursuit

Athlete	Event	Qualification		Semifinals		Final	
Athlete	Event	Time	Rank	Opponent Results	Rank	Opponent Results	Rank
María Luisa Calle	Women's individual pursuit	3:35.430	9	Did not advance			

Time trial

Athlete	Event	Time	Rank
Wilson Meneses	Men's time trial	1:03.614	13

Omnium

Athlete	Event	Points	Laps	Rank
María Luisa Calle	Women's points race	12	0	3rd place, bronze medalist(s)
Leonardo Duque; José Serpa	Men's madison	3	−2	16

== Diving ==
Colombian divers qualified for two individual spots at the 2004 Olympic Games.

Men

Athlete	Event	Preliminaries		Semifinals		Final	
Athlete	Event	Points	Rank	Points	Rank	Points	Rank
Juan Urán	3 m springboard	344.40	31	Did not advance			
Juan Urán	10 m platform	439.77	10 Q	617.04	11 Q	605.46	12

== Equestrian ==
=== Dressage ===
Athlete	Horse	Event	Grand Prix		Grand Prix Special		Grand Prix Freestyle		Overall	
Athlete	Horse	Event	Score	Rank	Score	Rank	Score	Rank	Score	Rank
César Parra	Galant du Serein	Individual	62.917	46	Did not advance					

== Fencing ==
Colombia has qualified a single fencer.

Women

Athlete	Event	Round of 64	Round of 32	Round of 16	Quarterfinal	Semifinal	Final / BM	
Athlete	Event	Opposition Score	Opposition Score	Opposition Score	Opposition Score	Opposition Score	Opposition Score	Rank
Ángela María Espinosa	Individual épée	Tychler (RSA); W 15–8	Heidemann (GER); L 3–15	Did not advance				

== Gymnastics ==
=== Artistic ===
Men

Athlete	Event	Qualification								Final							
Athlete	Event	Apparatus						Total	Rank	Apparatus						Total	Rank
Athlete	Event	F	PH	R	V	PB	HB	Total	Rank	F	PH	R	V	PB	HB	Total	Rank
Jorge Hugo Giraldo	All-around	9.137	8.437	9.237	9.412	9.437	9.337	54.997	32	Did not advance							

== Judo ==
Three Colombian judoka (two males and one female) qualified for the 2004 Summer Olympics.

Athlete	Event	Round of 32	Round of 16	Quarterfinals	Semifinals	Repechage 1	Repechage 2	Repechage 3	Final / BM	
Athlete	Event	Opposition Result	Opposition Result	Opposition Result	Opposition Result	Opposition Result	Opposition Result	Opposition Result	Opposition Result	Rank
Mario Valles	Men's −81 kg	Canto (BRA); L 0000–1000	Did not advance							
Sergio Camacho	Men's +100 kg	Pepic (AUS); L 0000–1000	Did not advance							
Lisseth Orozco	Women's −48 kg	Shishkina (KAZ); L 0011–0012	Did not advance							

== Shooting ==
Three Colombian shooters (two men and one woman) qualified to compete in the following events:

Men

Athlete	Event	Qualification		Final	
Athlete	Event	Points	Rank	Points	Rank
Danilo Caro	Trap	108	33	Did not advance	
Diego Duarte	Skeet	120	=15	Did not advance	

Women

Athlete	Event	Qualification		Final	
Athlete	Event	Points	Rank	Points	Rank
Amanda Mondol	10 m air pistol	368	=35	Did not advance	
Amanda Mondol	25 m pistol	577	=13	Did not advance	

== Swimming ==
Colombian swimmers earned qualifying standards in the following events (up to a maximum of 2 swimmers in each event at the A-standard time, and 1 at the B-standard time):

Men

Athlete	Event	Heat		Semifinal		Final	
Athlete	Event	Time	Rank	Time	Rank	Time	Rank
Camilo Becerra	50 m freestyle	23.23	=36	Did not advance			
Camilo Becerra	100 m freestyle	52.57	53	Did not advance			
Camilo Becerra	100 m butterfly	57.71	37	Did not advance			
Omar Pinzón	200 m backstroke	2:07.26	35	Did not advance			

Women

Athlete	Event	Heat		Final	
Athlete	Event	Time	Rank	Time	Rank
Paola Duguet	400 m freestyle	4:20.69	29	Did not advance	
Paola Duguet	800 m freestyle	9:06.96	27	Did not advance	

== Taekwondo ==
Three Colombian taekwondo jin qualified for the following events.

Athlete	Event	Round of 16	Quarterfinals	Semifinals	Repechage 1	Repechage 2	Final / BM	
Athlete	Event	Opposition Result	Opposition Result	Opposition Result	Opposition Result	Opposition Result	Opposition Result	Rank
Julian Rojas	Men's +80 kg	Nikolaidis (GRE); L 3–7	Did not advance		Zrouri (MAR); L 2–6	Did not advance		7
Gladys Mora	Women's −49 kg	Putri (INA); W 2–2 SUP	Chen S-H (TPE); L 0–1	Did not advance	Baidya (NEP); W 5–(−1)	Carías (GUA); W 2–0	Boorapolchai (THA); L 1–2	4
Paola Delgado	Women's −57 kg	Salazar (MEX); L 2–5	Did not advance					

== Tennis ==
Two Colombian tennis players qualified for the following events.

Athlete	Event	Round of 64	Round of 32	Round of 16	Quarterfinals	Semifinals	Final / BM	
Athlete	Event	Opposition Score	Opposition Score	Opposition Score	Opposition Score	Opposition Score	Opposition Score	Rank
Catalina Castaño	Women's singles	Daniilidou (GRE); L 2–6, 1–6	Did not advance					
Fabiola Zuluaga	Women's singles	Janković (SCG); W 6–4, 6–1	Suárez (ARG); W 4–6, 7–6^{(7–1)}, 6–1	Schiavone (ITA); L 7–6^{(7–5)}, 1–6, 3–6	Did not advance			
Catalina Castaño; Fabiola Zuluaga	Women's doubles	—N/a	Kremer / Schaul (LUX); W 7–6^{(9–7)}, 2–6, 9–7	Molik / Stubbs (AUS); L 4–6, 2–6	Did not advance			

== Triathlon ==
Colombia has qualified a single triathlete.

Athlete	Event	Swim (1.5 km)	Trans 1	Bike (40 km)	Trans 2	Run (10 km)	Total Time	Rank
Fiorella D'Croz	Women's	20:32	0:19	1:18:19	0:23	42:12	2:21:03.46	42

== Weightlifting ==
Nine Colombian weightlifters qualified for the following events:

Men

Athlete	Event	Snatch		Clean & Jerk		Total	Rank
Athlete	Event	Result	Rank	Result	Rank	Total	Rank
Nelson Castro	−56 kg	117.5	=9	145	=8	262.5	9
Óscar Figueroa	−56 kg	125	=4	155	=3	280	5
Diego Salazar	−62 kg	~~135.0~~	DNF	—	—	—	DNF
Carlos Andica	−77 kg	142.5	=21	180	=17	322.5	18
Héctor Ballesteros	−85 kg	157.5	13	197.5	9	355	9

Women

Athlete	Event	Snatch		Clean & Jerk		Total	Rank
Athlete	Event	Result	Rank	Result	Rank	Total	Rank
Mabel Mosquera	−53 kg	87.5	=3	110	3	197.5	3rd place, bronze medalist(s)
Ubaldina Valoyes	−69 kg	105	=6	127.5	8	232.5	8
Tulia Medina	−75 kg	112.5	=7	132.5	9	245	8
Carmenza Delgado	+75 kg	120	9	150	=8	270	9

== Wrestling ==
Key

- VT - Victory by Fall.
- PP - Decision by Points - the loser with technical points.
- PO - Decision by Points - the loser without technical points.

Men's Greco-Roman

Athlete	Event	Elimination Pool				Quarterfinal	Semifinal	Final / BM	
Athlete	Event	Opposition Result	Opposition Result	Opposition Result	Rank	Opposition Result	Opposition Result	Opposition Result	Rank
Luis Izquierdo	−66 kg	Vardanyan (UKR); L 0–4 ^{ST}	Eroğlu (TUR); L 0–4 ^{ST}	Kvirkvelia (GEO); W 5–0 ^{EV}	3	Did not advance			10

== See also ==
- Colombia at the 2003 Pan American Games
- Colombia at the 2004 Summer Paralympics
