= Thailand at the 2004 Summer Olympics =

- IOC code: THA
- NOC: National Olympic Committee of Thailand
- Website: www.olympicthai.or.th (in Thai and English)

in Athens
- Competitors: 42 in 13 sports
- Flag bearer: Paradorn Srichaphan
- Medals Ranked 25th: Gold 3 Silver 1 Bronze 4 Total 8

Summer Olympics appearances (overview)
- 1952; 1956; 1960; 1964; 1968; 1972; 1976; 1980; 1984; 1988; 1992; 1996; 2000; 2004; 2008; 2012; 2016; 2020; 2024

Thailand competed at the 2004 Summer Olympics in Athens, Greece, from 13 to 29 August 2004. This was the nation's thirteenth appearance at the Olympics, except the 1980 Summer Olympics in Moscow because of its partial support to the United States boycott.

The National Olympic Committee of Thailand sent a total of 42 athletes to the Games, 24 men and 18 women, to compete in 13 sports; the nation's team size was roughly smaller from Sydney by ten athletes. Fourteen of them had previously competed in Sydney, including featherweight boxer and 1996 Olympic champion Somluck Kamsing, and Asia's top tennis star Paradorn Srichaphan, who was later appointed by the committee to carry the Thai flag in the opening ceremony. Along with Kamsing, US-based swimmer Ratapong Sirisanont and badminton player Pramote Teerawiwatana became the first Thai athletes to compete in four Olympic Games. Among the sports played by athletes at these Games, Thailand marked its debut in equestrian and taekwondo.

Thailand left Athens with a total of eight medals (three golds, one silver, and four bronze), setting a historic milestone as the nation's most successful Games in Olympic history. Thai athletes continued to dominate in boxing and weightlifting, where they each won more than two Olympic medals, including a prestigious gold from Manus Boonjumnong in light welterweight boxing, and Udomporn Polsak, and Pawina Thongsuk in women's weightlifting.

== Medalists ==
Medal	Name	Sport	Event	Date
Gold	Udomporn Polsak	Weightlifting	Women's 53 kg	August 15
Gold	Pawina Thongsuk	Weightlifting	Women's 75 kg	August 20
Gold	Manus Boonjumnong	Boxing	Light welterweight	August 28
Silver	Worapoj Petchkoom	Boxing	Bantamweight	August 29
Bronze	Aree Wiratthaworn	Weightlifting	Women's 48 kg	August 14
Bronze	Wandee Kameaim	Weightlifting	Women's 58 kg	August 16
Bronze	Yaowapa Boorapolchai	Taekwondo	Women's 49 kg	August 26
Bronze	Suriya Prasathinphimai	Boxing	Middleweight	August 28

== Athletics ==
Thai athletes have so far achieved qualifying standards in the following athletics events (up to a maximum of 3 athletes in each event at the 'A' Standard, and 1 at the 'B' Standard).

Key

- Note–Ranks given for track events are within the athlete's heat only
- Q = Qualified for the next round
- q = Qualified for the next round as a fastest loser or, in field events, by position without achieving the qualifying target
- NR = National record
- N/A = Round not applicable for the event
- Bye = Athlete not required to compete in round

Women
Track & road events

Athlete	Event	Heat		Semifinal		Final	
Athlete	Event	Result	Rank	Result	Rank	Result	Rank
Trecia Roberts	100 m hurdles	13.80	8	Did not advance			

Field events

Athlete	Event	Qualification		Final	
Athlete	Event	Distance	Position	Distance	Position
Noengrothai Chaipetch	High jump	1.89	21	Did not advance	
Juttaporn Krasaeyan	Shot put	16.49	25	Did not advance	

== Badminton ==
Men

Athlete	Event	Round of 32	Round of 16	Quarterfinal	Semifinal	Final / BM	
Athlete	Event	Opposition Score	Opposition Score	Opposition Score	Opposition Score	Opposition Score	Rank
Boonsak Ponsana	Singles	Dednam (RSA); W 15–1, 15–0	Lee H-I (KOR); W 15–11, 15–13	Susilo (SIN); W 15–10, 15–1	Hidayat (INA); L 9–15, 2–15	Kuncoro (INA); L 11–15, 16–17	4
Tesana Panvisvas; Pramote Teerawiwatana	Doubles	Brehaut / Denney (AUS); W 15–3, 15–9	Choong T F / Lee W W (MAS); L 10–15, 13–15	Did not advance			
Patapol Ngernsrisuk; Sudket Prapakamol	Doubles	Clark / Robertson (GBR); L 5–15, 9–15	Did not advance				

Women

Athlete	Event	Round of 32	Round of 16	Quarterfinal	Semifinal	Final / BM	
Athlete	Event	Opposition Score	Opposition Score	Opposition Score	Opposition Score	Opposition Score	Rank
Salakjit Ponsana	Singles	Tanaka (JPN); W 11–7, 5–11, 11–8	Gong Rn (CHN); L 8–11, 3–11	Did not advance			
Sathinee Chankrachangwong; Saralee Thungthongkam	Doubles	Julien / Rice (CAN); W 15–3, 15–4	Nakayama / Yoshitomi (JPN); W 15–4, 15–11	Yang W / Zhang Jw (CHN); L 2–15, 4–15	Did not advance		

Mixed

Athlete	Event	Round of 32	Round of 16	Quarterfinal	Semifinal	Final / BM	
Athlete	Event	Opposition Score	Opposition Score	Opposition Score	Opposition Score	Opposition Score	Rank
Sudket Prapakamol; Saralee Thungthongkam	Doubles	Bye	Bergström / Persson (SWE); L 3–15, 17–14, 3–15	Did not advance			

== Boxing ==
Thailand sent six boxers to Athens.

Athlete	Event	Round of 32	Round of 16	Quarterfinals	Semifinals	Final	
Athlete	Event	Opposition Result	Opposition Result	Opposition Result	Opposition Result	Opposition Result	Rank
Suban Pannon	Light flyweight	Salimov (BUL); W 26–14	Bartelemí (CUB); L 14–23	Did not advance			
Somjit Jongjohor	Flyweight	Kim K-S (KOR); W 22–12	Gamboa (CUB); L 21–26	Did not advance			
Worapoj Petchkoom	Bantamweight	Kim W-I (KOR); W RSC	Khatsigov (BLR); W 33–18	Bolum (NGR); W 29–14	Mammadov (AZE); W 27–19	Rigondeaux (CUB); L 13–22	2nd place, silver medalist(s)
Somluck Kamsing	Featherweight	Gaudet (CAN); L 17–32	Did not advance				
Manus Boonjumnong	Light welterweight	Ioannidis (GRE); W 28–16	Brin (PHI); W 29–15	Blain (FRA); W 20–8	Gheorghe (ROM); W 30–9	Johnson (CUB); W 17–11	1st place, gold medalist(s)
Suriya Prasathinphimai	Middleweight	Lubega (UGA); W 30–21	Taghiyev (AZE); W 19^{+}–19	Mashkin (UKR); W 28–22	Gaydarbekov (RUS); L 18–24	Did not advance	3rd place, bronze medalist(s)

== Equestrian ==
=== Eventing ===
Athlete	Horse	Event	Dressage		Cross-country			Jumping						Total	
Athlete	Horse	Event	Dressage		Cross-country			Qualifier			Final			Total	
Athlete	Horse	Event	Penalties	Rank	Penalties	Total	Rank	Penalties	Total	Rank	Penalties	Total	Rank	Penalties	Rank
Pongsiree Bunluewong	Eliza Jane	Individual	74.60	71	4.40	79.00	43	32.00	110.00	51	Did not advance			110.00	51

== Fencing ==
Men

Athlete	Event	Round of 64	Round of 32	Round of 16	Quarterfinal	Semifinal	Final / BM	
Athlete	Event	Opposition Score	Opposition Score	Opposition Score	Opposition Score	Opposition Score	Opposition Score	Rank
Siriroj Rathprasert	Individual épée	El-Din (EGY); W 15–13	Boisse (FRA); L 5–15	Did not advance				
Wiradech Kothny	Individual sabre	Bye	Medina (ESP); W 15–13	Lukashenko (UKR); L 11–15	Did not advance			

== Rowing ==
Thai rowers qualified the following boats:

Women

Athlete	Event	Heats		Repechage		Semifinals		Final	
Athlete	Event	Time	Rank	Time	Rank	Time	Rank	Time	Rank
Phuttharaksa Neegree	Single sculls	8:24.03	5 R	7:53.52	5 SC/D	8:17.13	5 FD	8:00.44	22

Qualification Legend: FA=Final A (medal); FB=Final B (non-medal); FC=Final C (non-medal); FD=Final D (non-medal); FE=Final E (non-medal); FF=Final F (non-medal); SA/B=Semifinals A/B; SC/D=Semifinals C/D; SE/F=Semifinals E/F; R=Repechage

== Sailing ==
Thai sailors have qualified one boat for each of the following events.

Men

Athlete	Event	Race											Net points	Final rank
Athlete	Event	1	2	3	4	5	6	7	8	9	10	M*	Net points	Final rank
Arun Homraruen	Mistral	14	28	20	~~DSQ~~	15	30	26	21	17	13	5	189	21

M = Medal race; OCS = On course side of the starting line; DSQ = Disqualified; DNF = Did not finish; DNS= Did not start; RDG = Redress given

== Shooting ==
Two Thai shooters qualified to compete in the following events:

Men

Athlete	Event	Qualification		Final	
Athlete	Event	Points	Rank	Points	Rank
Tevarit Majchacheeap	10 m air rifle	587	=35	Did not advance	
Tevarit Majchacheeap	50 m rifle prone	589	=36	Did not advance	
Tevarit Majchacheeap	50 m rifle 3 positions	1159	=16	Did not advance	
Jakkrit Panichpatikum	10 m air pistol	571	=36	Did not advance	
Jakkrit Panichpatikum	50 m pistol	549	=28	Did not advance	

== Swimming ==
Thai swimmers earned qualifying standards in the following events (up to a maximum of 2 swimmers in each event at the A-standard time, and 1 at the B-standard time):

Men

Athlete	Event	Heat		Semifinal		Final	
Athlete	Event	Time	Rank	Time	Rank	Time	Rank
Arwut Chinnapasaen	50 m freestyle	23.52	46	Did not advance			
Charnvudth Saengsri	400 m freestyle	3:59.89	33	—		Did not advance	
Charnvudth Saengsri	1500 m freestyle	15:54.46	27	—		Did not advance	
Ratapong Sirisanont	100 m breaststroke	DSQ		Did not advance			
Ratapong Sirisanont	200 m breaststroke	2:15.39	19	Did not advance			

Women

Athlete	Event	Heat		Semifinal		Final	
Athlete	Event	Time	Rank	Time	Rank	Time	Rank
Pilin Tachakittiranan	200 m freestyle	2:05.29	35	Did not advance			
Pilin Tachakittiranan	400 m freestyle	4:23.62	34	—		Did not advance	
Nimitta Thaveesupsoonthorn	400 m individual medley	5:00.06	22	—		Did not advance	
Chonlathorn Vorathamrong	100 m backstroke	1:05.15	32	Did not advance			
Chonlathorn Vorathamrong	200 m backstroke	2:21.11	29	Did not advance			

== Table tennis ==
Thailand has qualified a single table tennis player.

Athlete	Event	Round 1	Round 2	Round 3	Round 4	Quarterfinals	Semifinals	Final / BM	
Athlete	Event	Opposition Result	Opposition Result	Opposition Result	Opposition Result	Opposition Result	Opposition Result	Opposition Result	Rank
Nanthana Komwong	Women's singles	Das (IND); W 4–0	Struse (GER); W 4–1	Pavlovich (BLR); L 2–4	Did not advance				

== Taekwondo ==
Four Thai taekwondo jin qualified for the following events.

Athlete	Event	Round of 16	Quarterfinals	Semifinals	Repechage 1	Repechage 2	Final / BM	
Athlete	Event	Opposition Result	Opposition Result	Opposition Result	Opposition Result	Opposition Result	Opposition Result	Rank
Ussadate Sutthikunkarn	Men's −58 kg	Mouroutsos (GRE); L 2–5	Did not advance					11
Kriangkrai Noikoed	Men's −80 kg	Karami (IRI); L 12–16	Did not advance					11
Yaowapa Boorapolchai	Women's −49 kg	Yagüe (ESP); W 9–5	Labrada (CUB); L 1–3	Did not advance	Bye	Gonda (CAN); W 2–(−1)	Mora (COL); W 2–1	3rd place, bronze medalist(s)
Nootcharin Sukkhongdumnoen	Women's −57 kg	Athanasopoulou (GRE); W 6–6 SUP	Chi S-J (TPE); W 2–1	Abdallah (USA); L 7–7 SUP	Bye	Reyes (ESP); L 3–6	Did not advance	5

== Tennis ==
Thailand nominated a male and a female tennis player to compete in the tournament.

Athlete	Event	Round of 64	Round of 32	Round of 16	Quarterfinals	Semifinals	Final / BM	
Athlete	Event	Opposition Score	Opposition Score	Opposition Score	Opposition Score	Opposition Score	Opposition Score	Rank
Paradorn Srichaphan	Men's singles	Johansson (SWE); L 2–6, 3–6	Did not advance					
Tamarine Tanasugarn	Women's singles	Widjaja (INA); L 6–1, 2–6, 1–6	Did not advance					

== Weightlifting ==
Five Thai weightlifters qualified for the following events:

Athlete	Event	Snatch		Clean & Jerk		Total	Rank
Athlete	Event	Result	Rank	Result	Rank	Total	Rank
Suriya Dattuyawat	Men's −69 kg	137.5	11	—	—	—	DNF
Aree Wiratthaworn	Women's −48 kg	85	3	115 OR	1	200	3rd place, bronze medalist(s)
Udomporn Polsak	Women's −53 kg	97.5	1	125	1	222.5	1st place, gold medalist(s)
Wandee Kameaim	Women's −58 kg	102.5	3	127.5	3	230	3rd place, bronze medalist(s)
Pawina Thongsuk	Women's −75 kg	122.5	2	150	1	272.5	1st place, gold medalist(s)

== See also ==
- Thailand at the 2002 Asian Games
- Thailand at the 2004 Summer Paralympics
