= Jermin Anwar =

Egyptian taekwondo practitioner

Personal information
- Full name: Jermin Anwar
- Nationality: Egypt
- Born: 30 September 1986 (age 40) Cairo, Egypt
- Height: 1.61 m (5 ft 3 1/2 in)
- Weight: 49 kg (108 lb)

Sport
- Sport: Taekwondo
- Event: 49 kg

Jermin Anwar (Arabic: جيرمين انور; born September 30, 1986, in Cairo) is an Egyptian taekwondo practitioner, who competed in the women's flyweight category at the 2004 Summer Olympics.

Anwar qualified as a seventeen-year-old teen for the Egyptian squad in the women's flyweight class (49 kg) at the 2004 Summer Olympics in Athens, by defeating Lesotho's Lineo Mochesane for the top spot and securing a berth from the African Olympic Qualifying Tournament in her native Cairo. With a limited international experience, Anwar had an early 2–3 defeat to fellow Canadian teenager Ivett Gonda during her opening match. When Gonda was defeated by Chinese Taipei's Chen Shih-hsin in the semifinals, Anwar was denied her chance to proceed into the repechage for the Olympic bronze medal.
