= List of Olympic medalists in taekwondo =

Taekwondo is an Olympic sport that is contested at the Summer Olympic Games. It was introduced in the 1988 and 1992 Olympic Games as a demonstration sport, and made its debut as a full medal sport at the 2000 Summer Olympics in Sydney, Australia. Both men and women compete in four events each defined by separate weight classes: flyweight, featherweight, middleweight and heavyweight. Traditionally, taekwondo competitions consist of eight weight classes for each gender, but Olympic taekwondo only has four due to the International Olympic Committee (IOC) limiting the total number of taekwondo entrants to 128.

The competitions are conducted in accordance with the rules established by the World Taekwondo (WT). The competition format for taekwondo is a single-elimination tournament to determine the gold and silver medal winners, and a repechage is used to determine the bronze medal winner(s). in 2000 and 2004, a single repechage final determined the sole bronze medal winner, but a rule change in 2008 created two repechage finals that allowed for the bronze medal to be shared between two competitors.

Iranian Hadi Saei (2 gold, 1 bronze), American Steven López (2 gold, 1 bronze), South Korean Hwang Kyung-Seon (2 gold, 1 bronze), Thai Panipak Wongpattanakit (2 gold, 1 bronze) and Mexican María del Rosario Espinoza (1 gold, 1 silver, 1 bronze) share the most medals in Taekwondo with three. By defending her title at 2012 London Olympics, Hwang Kyung-Seon became the first woman ever to win three Olympic taekwondo medals. Hadi Saei and Steven López, along with Huang Chih-hsiung of Chinese Taipei, are the only three athletes to have won medals in multiple weight classes. Spanish Adriana Cerezo is the youngest athlete to win a medal (17 years, 242 days) and Hadi Saei is the oldest (32 years, 2 months, 13 days). Rohullah Nikpai of Afghanistan became his country's first ever Olympic medalist with a bronze medal in 2008. South Korea has been the most successful nation in Olympic taekwondo, winning 22 medals (12 gold, 3 silver, 7 bronze). China is the second most successful nation with 11 medals (7 gold, 1 silver, 3 bronze). A total of 32 gold medals, 32 silver medals and 48 bronze medals have been awarded since 2000 and have been won by athletes from 33 National Olympic Committees (NOC).

== Men ==
=== Flyweight (58 kg) ===
Games	Gold	Silver	Bronze
2000 Sydney	Michail Mouroutsos; Greece	Gabriel Esparza; Spain	Huang Chih-hsiung; Chinese Taipei
2004 Athens	Chu Mu-yen; Chinese Taipei	Óscar Salazar; Mexico	Tamer Bayoumi; Egypt
2008 Beijing	Guillermo Pérez; Mexico	Gabriel Mercedes; Dominican Republic	Rohullah Nikpai; Afghanistan
2008 Beijing	Guillermo Pérez; Mexico	Gabriel Mercedes; Dominican Republic	Chu Mu-yen; Chinese Taipei
2012 London	Joel González; Spain	Lee Dae-hoon; South Korea	Óscar Muñoz; Colombia
2012 London	Joel González; Spain	Lee Dae-hoon; South Korea	Aleksey Denisenko; Russia
2016 Rio de Janeiro	Zhao Shuai; China	Tawin Hanprab; Thailand	Luisito Pie; Dominican Republic
2016 Rio de Janeiro	Zhao Shuai; China	Tawin Hanprab; Thailand	Kim Tae-hun; South Korea
2020 Tokyo	Vito Dell'Aquila; Italy	Mohamed Khalil Jendoubi; Tunisia	Mikhail Artamonov; ROC
2020 Tokyo	Vito Dell'Aquila; Italy	Mohamed Khalil Jendoubi; Tunisia	Jang Jun; South Korea
2024 Paris	Park Tae-joon; South Korea	Gashim Magomedov; Azerbaijan	Cyrian Ravet; France
2024 Paris	Park Tae-joon; South Korea	Gashim Magomedov; Azerbaijan	Mohamed Khalil Jendoubi; Tunisia
2028 Los Angeles			

Medals
Rank	Nation	Gold	Silver	Bronze	Total
1	South Korea	1	1	2	4
2	Mexico	1	1	0	2
2	Spain	1	1	0	2
4	Chinese Taipei	1	0	2	3
5	China	1	0	0	1
5	Greece	1	0	0	1
5	Italy	1	0	0	1
8	Dominican Republic	0	1	1	2
8	Tunisia	0	1	1	2
10	Thailand	0	1	0	1
10	Azerbaijan	0	1	0	1
12	Afghanistan	0	0	1	1
12	Egypt	0	0	1	1
12	Colombia	0	0	1	1
12	Russia	0	0	1	1
12	ROC (ROC)	0	0	1	1
12	France	0	0	1	1
Total	17 nations	7	7	12	26

=== Featherweight (68 kg) ===
Games	Gold	Silver	Bronze
2000 Sydney	Steven López; United States	Sin Joon-sik; South Korea	Hadi Saei; Iran
2004 Athens	Hadi Saei; Iran	Huang Chih-hsiung; Chinese Taipei	Song Myeong-seob; South Korea
2008 Beijing	Son Tae-jin; South Korea	Mark López; United States	Servet Tazegül; Turkey
2008 Beijing	Son Tae-jin; South Korea	Mark López; United States	Sung Yu-chi; Chinese Taipei
2012 London	Servet Tazegül; Turkey	Mohammad Bagheri Motamed; Iran	Terrence Jennings; United States
2012 London	Servet Tazegül; Turkey	Mohammad Bagheri Motamed; Iran	Rohullah Nikpai; Afghanistan
2016 Rio de Janeiro	Ahmad Abughaush; Jordan	Aleksey Denisenko; Russia	Lee Dae-hoon; South Korea
2016 Rio de Janeiro	Ahmad Abughaush; Jordan	Aleksey Denisenko; Russia	Joel González; Spain
2020 Tokyo	Ulugbek Rashitov; Uzbekistan	Bradly Sinden; Great Britain	Hakan Reçber; Turkey
2020 Tokyo	Ulugbek Rashitov; Uzbekistan	Bradly Sinden; Great Britain	Zhao Shuai; China
2024 Paris	Ulugbek Rashitov; Uzbekistan	Zaid Kareem; Jordan	Liang Yushuai; China
2024 Paris	Ulugbek Rashitov; Uzbekistan	Zaid Kareem; Jordan	Edival Pontes; Brazil
2028 Los Angeles			

Medals
Rank	Nation	Gold	Silver	Bronze	Total
1	Uzbekistan	2	0	0	2
2	South Korea	1	1	2	4
3	Iran	1	1	1	3
3	United States	1	1	1	3
5	Jordan	1	1	0	2
6	Turkey	1	0	2	3
7	Chinese Taipei	0	1	1	2
8	Great Britain	0	1	0	1
8	Russia	0	1	0	1
10	China	0	0	2	2
11	Afghanistan	0	0	1	1
11	Spain	0	0	1	1
11	Brazil	0	0	1	1
Total	13 nations	7	7	12	26

=== Middleweight (80 kg) ===
Games	Gold	Silver	Bronze
2000 Sydney	Ángel Matos; Cuba	Faissal Ebnoutalib; Germany	Victor Estrada; Mexico
2004 Athens	Steven López; United States	Bahri Tanrıkulu; Turkey	Yousef Karami; Iran
2008 Beijing	Hadi Saei; Iran	Mauro Sarmiento; Italy	Zhu Guo; China
2008 Beijing	Hadi Saei; Iran	Mauro Sarmiento; Italy	Steven López; United States
2012 London	Sebastián Crismanich; Argentina	Nicolás García; Spain	Lutalo Muhammad; Great Britain
2012 London	Sebastián Crismanich; Argentina	Nicolás García; Spain	Mauro Sarmiento; Italy
2016 Rio de Janeiro	Cheick Sallah Cissé; Ivory Coast	Lutalo Muhammad; Great Britain	Milad Beigi; Azerbaijan
2016 Rio de Janeiro	Cheick Sallah Cissé; Ivory Coast	Lutalo Muhammad; Great Britain	Oussama Oueslati; Tunisia
2020 Tokyo	Maksim Khramtsov; ROC	Saleh El-Sharabaty; Jordan	Toni Kanaet; Croatia
2020 Tokyo	Maksim Khramtsov; ROC	Saleh El-Sharabaty; Jordan	Seif Eissa; Egypt
2024 Paris	Firas Katoussi; Tunisia	Mehran Barkhordari; Iran	Simone Alessio; Italy; Edi Hrnic; Denmark
2028 Los Angeles			

=== Heavyweight (+80 kg) ===
Games	Gold	Silver	Bronze
2000 Sydney	Kim Kyong-hun; South Korea	Daniel Trenton; Australia	Pascal Gentil; France
2004 Athens	Moon Dae-sung; South Korea	Alexandros Nikolaidis; Greece	Pascal Gentil; France
2008 Beijing	Cha Dong-min; South Korea	Alexandros Nikolaidis; Greece	Chika Chukwumerije; Nigeria
2008 Beijing	Cha Dong-min; South Korea	Alexandros Nikolaidis; Greece	Arman Chilmanov; Kazakhstan
2012 London	Carlo Molfetta; Italy	Anthony Obame; Gabon	Robelis Despaigne; Cuba
2012 London	Carlo Molfetta; Italy	Anthony Obame; Gabon	Liu Xiaobo; China
2016 Rio de Janeiro	Radik Isayev; Azerbaijan	Abdoul Issoufou; Niger	Maicon Andrade; Brazil
2016 Rio de Janeiro	Radik Isayev; Azerbaijan	Abdoul Issoufou; Niger	Cha Dong-min; South Korea
2020 Tokyo	Vladislav Larin; ROC	Dejan Georgievski; North Macedonia	In Kyo-don; South Korea
2020 Tokyo	Vladislav Larin; ROC	Dejan Georgievski; North Macedonia	Rafael Alba; Cuba
2024 Paris	Arian Salimi; Iran	Caden Cunningham; Great Britain	Rafael Alba; Cuba
2024 Paris	Arian Salimi; Iran	Caden Cunningham; Great Britain	Cheick Sallah Cissé; Ivory Coast
2028 Los Angeles			

== Women ==
=== Flyweight (49 kg) ===
Games	Gold	Silver	Bronze
2000 Sydney	Lauren Burns; Australia	Urbia Melendez; Cuba	Chi Shu-ju; Chinese Taipei
2004 Athens	Chen Shih-hsin; Chinese Taipei	Yanelis Labrada; Cuba	Yaowapa Boorapolchai; Thailand
2008 Beijing	Wu Jingyu; China	Buttree Puedpong; Thailand	Daynellis Montejo; Cuba
2008 Beijing	Wu Jingyu; China	Buttree Puedpong; Thailand	Dalia Contreras; Venezuela
2012 London	Wu Jingyu; China	Brigitte Yagüe; Spain	Chanatip Sonkham; Thailand
2012 London	Wu Jingyu; China	Brigitte Yagüe; Spain	Lucija Zaninović; Croatia
2016 Rio de Janeiro	Kim So-hui; South Korea	Tijana Bogdanović; Serbia	Patimat Abakarova; Azerbaijan
2016 Rio de Janeiro	Kim So-hui; South Korea	Tijana Bogdanović; Serbia	Panipak Wongpattanakit; Thailand
2020 Tokyo	Panipak Wongpattanakit; Thailand	Adriana Cerezo; Spain	Avishag Semberg; Israel
2020 Tokyo	Panipak Wongpattanakit; Thailand	Adriana Cerezo; Spain	Tijana Bogdanović; Serbia
2024 Paris	Panipak Wongpattanakit; Thailand	Guo Qing; China	Mobina Nematzadeh; Iran
2024 Paris	Panipak Wongpattanakit; Thailand	Guo Qing; China	Lena Stojković; Croatia
2028 Los Angeles			

=== Featherweight (57 kg) ===
Games	Gold	Silver	Bronze
2000 Sydney	Jung Jae-eun; South Korea	Tran Hieu Ngan; Vietnam	Hamide Bıkçın Tosun; Turkey
2004 Athens	Jang Ji-won; South Korea	Nia Abdallah; United States	Iridia Salazar; Mexico
2008 Beijing	Lim Su-jeong; South Korea	Azize Tanrıkulu; Turkey	Diana López; United States
2008 Beijing	Lim Su-jeong; South Korea	Azize Tanrıkulu; Turkey	Martina Zubčić; Croatia
2012 London	Jade Jones; Great Britain	Hou Yuzhuo; China	Marlène Harnois; France
2012 London	Jade Jones; Great Britain	Hou Yuzhuo; China	Tseng Li-cheng; Chinese Taipei
2016 Rio de Janeiro	Jade Jones; Great Britain	Eva Calvo; Spain	Kimia Alizadeh; Iran
2016 Rio de Janeiro	Jade Jones; Great Britain	Eva Calvo; Spain	Hedaya Malak; Egypt
2020 Tokyo	Anastasija Zolotic; United States	Tatiana Minina; ROC	Lo Chia-ling; Chinese Taipei
2020 Tokyo	Anastasija Zolotic; United States	Tatiana Minina; ROC	Hatice Kübra İlgün; Turkey
2024 Paris	Kim Yu-jin; South Korea	Nahid Kiani; Iran	Skylar Park; Canada
2024 Paris	Kim Yu-jin; South Korea	Nahid Kiani; Iran	Kimia Alizadeh; Bulgaria
2028 Los Angeles			

=== Middleweight (67 kg) ===
Games	Gold	Silver	Bronze
2000 Sydney	Lee Sun-hee; South Korea	Trude Gundersen; Norway	Yoriko Okamoto; Japan
2004 Athens	Luo Wei; China	Elisavet Mystakidou; Greece	Hwang Kyung-seon; South Korea
2008 Beijing	Hwang Kyung-seon; South Korea	Karine Sergerie; Canada	Gwladys Épangue; France
2008 Beijing	Hwang Kyung-seon; South Korea	Karine Sergerie; Canada	Sandra Šarić; Croatia
2012 London	Hwang Kyung-seon; South Korea	Nur Tatar; Turkey	Paige McPherson; United States
2012 London	Hwang Kyung-seon; South Korea	Nur Tatar; Turkey	Helena Fromm; Germany
2016 Rio de Janeiro	Oh Hye-ri; South Korea	Haby Niaré; France	Ruth Gbagbi; Ivory Coast
2016 Rio de Janeiro	Oh Hye-ri; South Korea	Haby Niaré; France	Nur Tatar; Turkey
2020 Tokyo	Matea Jelić; Croatia	Lauren Williams; Great Britain	Ruth Gbagbi; Ivory Coast
2020 Tokyo	Matea Jelić; Croatia	Lauren Williams; Great Britain	Hedaya Wahba; Egypt
2024 Paris	Viviana Márton; Hungary	Aleksandra Perišić; Serbia	Sarah Chaâri; Belgium
2024 Paris	Viviana Márton; Hungary	Aleksandra Perišić; Serbia	Kristina Teachout; United States
2028 Los Angeles			

=== Heavyweight (+67 kg) ===
Games	Gold	Silver	Bronze
2000 Sydney	Chen Zhong; China	Natalia Ivanova; Russia	Dominique Bosshart; Canada
2004 Athens	Chen Zhong; China	Myriam Baverel; France	Adriana Carmona; Venezuela
2008 Beijing	María del Rosario Espinoza; Mexico	Nina Solheim; Norway	Sarah Stevenson; Great Britain
2008 Beijing	María del Rosario Espinoza; Mexico	Nina Solheim; Norway	Natália Falavigna; Brazil
2012 London	Milica Mandić; Serbia	Anne-Caroline Graffe; France	Anastasia Baryshnikova; Russia
2012 London	Milica Mandić; Serbia	Anne-Caroline Graffe; France	María del Rosario Espinoza; Mexico
2016 Rio de Janeiro	Zheng Shuyin; China	María del Rosario Espinoza; Mexico	Bianca Walkden; Great Britain
2016 Rio de Janeiro	Zheng Shuyin; China	María del Rosario Espinoza; Mexico	Jackie Galloway; United States
2020 Tokyo	Milica Mandić; Serbia	Lee Da-bin; South Korea	Althéa Laurin; France
2020 Tokyo	Milica Mandić; Serbia	Lee Da-bin; South Korea	Bianca Walkden; Great Britain
2024 Paris	Althéa Laurin; France	Svetlana Osipova; Uzbekistan	Lee Da-bin; South Korea
2024 Paris	Althéa Laurin; France	Svetlana Osipova; Uzbekistan	Nafia Kuş; Turkey
2028 Los Angeles			

== Statistics ==
=== Athlete medal leaders ===
Athletes who won at least two medals are listed below.

Athlete	Nation	Gender	Olympics^{[a]}	Gold	Silver	Bronze	Total
Hadi Saei	Iran	Male	2000–2008	2	0	1	3
Steven López	United States	Male	2000–2008	2	0	1	3
Hwang Kyung-seon	South Korea	Female	2004–2012	2	0	1	3
Panipak Wongpattanakit	Thailand	Female	2016–2024	2	0	1	3
Chen Zhong	China	Female	2000–2004	2	0	0	2
Wu Jingyu	China	Female	2008–2012	2	0	0	2
Jade Jones	Great Britain	Female	2012–2016	2	0	0	2
Milica Mandić	Serbia	Female	2012–2020	2	0	0	2
Ulugbek Rashitov	Uzbekistan	Male	2020–2024	2	0	0	2
María Espinoza	Mexico	Female	2008–2016	1	1	1	3
Zhao Shuai	China	Male	2016–2020	1	0	1	2
Cheick Sallah Cissé	Ivory Coast	Male	2016–2024	1	0	1	2
Althéa Laurin	France	Female	2020–2024	1	0	1	2
Chu Mu-yen	Chinese Taipei	Male	2004–2008	1	0	1	2
Servet Tazegül	Turkey	Male	2008–2012	1	0	1	2
Cha Dong-min	South Korea	Male	2008–2016	1	0	1	2
Joel González	Spain	Male	2012–2016	1	0	1	2
Alexandros Nikolaidis	Greece	Male	2004–2008	0	2	0	2
Huang Chih-hsiung	Chinese Taipei	Male	2000–2004	0	1	1	2
Mauro Sarmiento	Italy	Male	2008–2012	0	1	1	2
Alexey Denisenko	Russia	Male	2012–2016	0	1	1	2
Lee Da-bin	South Korea	Female	2020–2024	0	1	1	2
Mohamed Khalil Jendoubi	Tunisia	Male	2020-2024	0	1	1	2
Lee Dae-hoon	South Korea	Male	2012–2016	0	1	1	2
Lutalo Muhammad	Great Britain	Male	2012–2016	0	1	1	2
Nur Tatar	Turkey	Female	2012–2016	0	1	1	2
Tijana Bogdanović	Serbia	Female	2016–2020	0	1	1	2
Pascal Gentil	France	Male	2000–2004	0	0	2	2
Rohullah Nikpai	Afghanistan	Male	2008–2012	0	0	2	2
Ruth Gbagbi	Ivory Coast	Female	2016–2020	0	0	2	2
Hedaya Wahba	Egypt	Female	2016–2020	0	0	2	2
Bianca Walkden	Great Britain	Female	2016–2020	0	0	2	2
Kimia Alizadeh	Iran/ Bulgaria	Female	2016–2024	0	0	2	2
Rafael Alba	Cuba	Male	2020–2024	0	0	2	2

^{a} The years indicate the Olympics at which the medals were won.

=== Medals per year ===
×	NOC did not exist	#	Number of medals won by the NOC	–	NOC did not win any medals

Nation	1896–1996	00	04	08	12	16	20	24	28	Total
Afghanistan (AFG)		–	–	1	1	–	–	–		2
Argentina		–	–	–	1	–	–	–		1
Australia		2	–	–	–	–	–	–		2
Azerbaijan		–	–	–	–	3	–	1		4
Brazil		–	–	1	–	1	–	1		3
Canada		1	–	1	–	–	–	1		3
China		1	2	2	3	2	1	2		13
Chinese Taipei		2	3	2	1	–	1	–		9
Croatia		–	–	2	1	–	2	1		6
Colombia		–	–	–	1	–	–	–		1
Cuba		2	1	1	1	–	1	1		7
Dominican Republic		–	–	1	–	1	–	–		2
Egypt		–	1	–	–	1	2	–		4
France		1	2	1	2	1	1	2		10
Gabon		–	–	–	1	–	–	–		1
Germany		1	–	–	1	–	–	–		2
Great Britain		–	–	1	2	3	3	1		10
Greece		1	2	1	–	–	–	–		4
Israel		–	–	–	–	–	1	–		1
Iran		1	2	1	1	1	–	4		10
Italy		–	–	1	2	–	1	1		5
Ivory Coast		–	–	–	–	2	1	1		4
Japan		1	–	–	–	–	–	–		1
Jordan		–	–	–	–	1	1	1		3
Kazakhstan		–	–	1	–	–	–	–		1
Mexico		1	2	2	1	1	–	–		7
Niger		–	–	–	–	1	–	–		1
Nigeria		–	–	1	–	–	–	–		1
North Macedonia		–	–	–	–	–	1	–		1
Norway		1	–	1	–	–	–	–		2
Russia / ROC		1	–	–	2	1	4	–		8
Serbia		–	–	–	1	1	2	1		5
South Korea		4	4	4	2	5	3	3		25
Spain		1	–	–	3	2	1	–		7
Thailand		–	1	1	1	2	1	1		7
Tunisia		–	–	–	–	–	1	2		3
Turkey		1	1	2	2	1	2	1		10
United States		1	2	3	2	1	1	1		11
Uzbekistan		–	–	–	–	–	1	1		2
Venezuela		–	1	1	–	–	–	–		2
Vietnam		1	–	–	–	–	–	–		1

== See also ==
- World Taekwondo Championships
- World Cup Taekwondo Team Championships
- Lists of Olympic medalists
