= Taekwondo at the 2006 Asian Games – Women's 47 kg =

Taekwondo competition

Women's 47 kg at the 2006 Asian Games
- Venue: Qatar SC Indoor Hall
- Date: 7 December 2006
- Competitors: 19 from 19 nations

Medalists
gold medal	Wu Jingyu	China
silver medal	Yang Shu-chun	Chinese Taipei
bronze medal	Yaowapa Boorapolchai	Thailand
bronze medal	Eunice Alora	Philippines

The women's finweight (−47 kilograms) event at the 2006 Asian Games took place on 7 December 2006 at Qatar SC Indoor Hall, Doha, Qatar.

== Schedule ==
All times are Arabia Standard Time (UTC+03:00)

Date	Time	Event
Thursday, 7 December 2006	14:00	1/16 finals
Thursday, 7 December 2006	14:00	1/8 finals
Thursday, 7 December 2006	14:00	Quarterfinals
Thursday, 7 December 2006	14:00	Semifinals
Thursday, 7 December 2006	14:00	Final

== Results ==
Legend

- DQ — Won by disqualification

=== Final ===
Final
Yang Shu-chun (TPE)	1
Wu Jingyu (CHN)	2

=== Top half ===
1/16 finals
Awatef Al-Assaf (JOR)	7
Yan Kumari Chaulagain (NEP)	0

1/8 finals
Yang Shu-chun (TPE)	5
Awatef Al-Assaf (JOR)	2
Shafiqa Kargar (AFG)	−1
Wala Al-Hashimi (BRN)	2
Yaowapa Boorapolchai (THA)	7
Maria da Conceição (TLS)	0
Areej Al-Saqqa (QAT)	0
Joelle Kamar (LIB)	2

Quarterfinals
Yang Shu-chun (TPE)	1
Wala Al-Hashimi (BRN)	0
Yaowapa Boorapolchai (THA)	1
Joelle Kamar (LIB)	−1

Semifinals
Yang Shu-chun (TPE)	2
Yaowapa Boorapolchai (THA)	0

=== Bottom half ===
1/16 finals
Juana Wangsa Putri (INA)	2
Jayati Pathak (IND)	1
Wu Jingyu (CHN)	DQ
Cheong Sai Long (MAC)

1/8 finals
Nazila Nezami (IRI)	2
Juana Wangsa Putri (INA)	7
Eunice Alora (PHI)	7
Aisha Al-Amer (KUW)	0
Kristina Korobko (TJK)	3
Zharkyn Kabirayeva (KAZ)	4
Wu Jingyu (CHN)	7
Nguyễn Thị Bích Ngọc (VIE)	2

Quarterfinals
Juana Wangsa Putri (INA)	0
Eunice Alora (PHI)	1
Zharkyn Kabirayeva (KAZ)	1
Wu Jingyu (CHN)	7

Semifinals
Eunice Alora (PHI)	2
Wu Jingyu (CHN)	3
