= Taekwondo at the 2002 Asian Games – Women's 51 kg =

Women's 51 kg at the 2002 Asian Games
- Venue: Gudeok Gymnasium
- Date: 11 October 2002
- Competitors: 11 from 11 nations

Medalists
gold medal	Lim Su-jeong	South Korea
silver medal	Yaowapa Boorapolchai	Thailand
bronze medal	Juana Wangsa Putri	Indonesia
bronze medal	Daleen Cordero	Philippines

The women's flyweight (−51 kilograms) event at the 2002 Asian Games took place on Friday 11 October 2002 at Gudeok Gymnasium, Busan, South Korea.

A total of eleven competitors from eleven countries competed in this event, limited to fighters whose body weight was less than 51 kilograms.

Lim Su-jeong of South Korea won the gold medal after beating Yaowapa Boorapolchai of Thailand in gold medal match 3–3 by superiority.

== Schedule ==
All times are Korea Standard Time (UTC+09:00)

Date	Time	Event
Friday, 11 October 2002	14:00	Round 1
Friday, 11 October 2002	14:00	Round 2
Friday, 11 October 2002	14:00	Semifinals
Friday, 11 October 2002	19:00	Final

== Results ==
Legend

- R — Won by referee stop contest

Round 1
Tayyebeh Fadaeinejad (IRI)	12^{R}
Shareefa Abdulla (BRN)	1
Daleen Cordero (PHI)	5
Tandin Tshomo (BHU)	0
Lim Su-jeong (KOR)	3
Sangina Baidya (NEP)	0

Round 2
Juana Wangsa Putri (INA)	6
Tayyebeh Fadaeinejad (IRI)	2
Wu Yen-ni (TPE)	1
Yaowapa Boorapolchai (THA)	5
Nguyễn Thị Xuân Mai (VIE)	3
Daleen Cordero (PHI)	3
Lim Su-jeong (KOR)	11
Soe Soe Myar (MYA)	0

Semifinals
Juana Wangsa Putri (INA)	3
Yaowapa Boorapolchai (THA)	6
Daleen Cordero (PHI)	0
Lim Su-jeong (KOR)	5

Final
Yaowapa Boorapolchai (THA)	3
Lim Su-jeong (KOR)	3
