= 2004 Summer Olympics Parade of Nations =

During the Parade of Nations portion of the 2004 Summer Olympics opening ceremony, athletes from each country participating in the Olympics paraded in the arena, preceded by their flag. The flag was borne by a sportsperson from that country chosen either by the National Olympic Committee or by the athletes themselves to represent their country.

== Parade order ==
The national team of Greece, as the host nation, entered the stadium last, breaking the tradition that the Greece national team enter first in every Olympic opening ceremony as a tribute for being the original host of both the Ancient and the Modern Olympic Games. However, in a nod to tradition, the Greek flag and flag bearer Pyrros Dimas entered at the beginning of the parade ahead of Saint Lucia, to avoid breaking the tradition entirely. Dimas also led the Greece national team when they entered last. Following tradition, other countries entered the stadium in name order in the language of the host country (Greece), which in this case is Modern Greek.

Kiribati and Timor-Leste competed for the first time at these Olympic Games, whereas Afghanistan returned from its eight-year absence after the national Olympic committee had been suspended under the Taliban regime since 1999. The parade of nations also featured a unified entrance by the athletes of the North and South Korea, holding a specially designed unification flag bearing the name "Korea" (Κορέα): a white background flag with a blue map of the Korean peninsula; however, the two teams competed separately.

Announcers in the stadium read off the names of the marching nations in Greek, French, and English (the official languages of the host country and of the Olympics, respectively) with the music, performed and played by Dutch musician Tiësto, accompanying the athletes as they marched into the stadium.

Whilst most countries entered under their short names, a few entered under more formal or alternative names, mostly due to political and naming disputes. The Republic of Macedonia entered as the "Former Yugoslav Republic of Macedonia'" ("Πρώην Γιουγκοσλαβική Δημοκρατία της Μακεδονίας") under Π because of the naming dispute with Greece. The Republic of China (commonly known as Taiwan) entered with the compromised name and flag of "Chinese Taipei" ("Κινεζικη Ταϊπεϊ") under Τ so that they did not enter together with conflicting People's Republic of China (commonly known as China), which entered as the "People's Republic of China" ("Λαϊκή Δημοκρατία της Κίνας") under Κ. The Republic of the Congo entered as just "Congo" (Κονγκό), while the Democratic Republic of the Congo entered with its full name, "Λαϊκή Δημοκρατία του Κονγκό" under Δ. The British Virgin Islands ("Βρετανικές Παρθένοι Νήσοι") entered under Β while the United States Virgin Islands entered as simply the "Virgin Islands" ("Παρθένοι Νήσοι"), under Π. Additionally, Ivory Coast, the United States, Iran, Laos, Libya, Russia, Syria and Hong Kong all entered under their formal names, respectively "Côte d'Ivoire", the "United States of America", "Islamic Republic of Iran", "Lao People's Democratic Republic", "Libyan Arab Jamahiriya", "Russian Federation", "Syrian Arab Republic" and "Hong Kong, China".

Notable flag bearers in the opening ceremony featured the following athletes: triple Grand Slam champion and tennis player Roger Federer (Switzerland), NBA basketball player Yao Ming (People's Republic of China), six-time Olympians and Star sailors Colin Beashel (Australia) and Torben Grael (Brazil), triple Olympic weightlifting champion Pyrros Dimas (Greece), show jumper Ludger Beerbaum (Germany), two-time Olympic sprint freestyle champion Alexander Popov (Russia), four-time rowing champion Elisabeta Lipă (Romania), decathlon champion Erki Nool (Estonia), and rings gymnast Jury Chechi (Italy).

== List ==
The following is a list of each country's announced flag bearer. The list is sorted by the order in which each nation appears in the parade of nations. The names are given in their official designations by the IOC.

Order	Nation	Greek	Roman transliteration	Flag bearer	Sport
1	Saint Lucia	Αγία Λουκία	Agía Loukía	Zepherinus Joseph	Athletics
2	Saint Vincent and the Grenadines	Άγιος Βικέντιος και Γρεναδίνες	Ágios Vikéndios kai Grenadínes	Natasha Mayers	Athletics
3	San Marino	Άγιος Μαρίνος	Ágios Marínos	Diego Mularoni	Swimming
4	Angola	Αγκόλα	Angóla	Angelo Victoriano	Basketball
5	Azerbaijan	Αζερμπαϊτζάν	Azerbaïtzán	Nizami Pashayev	Weightlifting
6	Egypt	Αίγυπτος	Aígyptos	Ali Ibrahim	Rowing
7	Ethiopia	Αιθιοπία	Aithiopía	Abel Aferalign	Boxing
8	Haiti	Αϊτή	Aïtí	Tudor Sanon	Taekwondo
9	Cape Verde	Πράσινο Ακρωτήριο	Prásino Akrotírio	Wania Monteiro	Gymnastics
10	Côte d'Ivoire	Ακτή Ελεφαντοστού	Aktí Elefandostoú	Mariam Bah	Taekwondo
11	Albania	Αλβανία	Alvanía	Klodiana Shala	Athletics
12	Algeria	Αλγερία	Algería	Djabir Saïd-Guerni	Athletics
13	American Samoa	Αμερικανικές Σαμόα	Amerikanikés Samóa	Lisa Misipeka	Athletics
14	Andorra	Ανδόρρα	Andórra	Hocine Haciane	Swimming
15	Antigua and Barbuda	Αντίγκουα και Μπαρμπούντα	Antígoua kai Barboúda	Daniel Bailey	Athletics
16	Argentina	Αργεντινή	Argentiní	Carlos Espínola	Sailing
17	Armenia	Αρμενία	Armenía	Albert Azaryan	Gymnastics (head coach)
18	Aruba	Αρούμπα	Aroúba	Roshendra Vrolijk	Swimming
19	Australia	Αυστραλία	Afstralía	Colin Beashel	Sailing
20	Austria	Αυστρία	Afstría	Roman Hagara	Sailing
21	Afghanistan	Αφγανιστάν	Afganistán	Neema Suratgar	Non-participant (coach)
22	Vanuatu	Βανουάτου	Vanouátou	Moses Kamut	Athletics
23	Belgium	Βέλγιο	Vélgio	Jean-Michel Saive	Table tennis
24	Venezuela	Βενεζουέλα	Venezouéla	Julio Luna	Weightlifting
25	Bermuda	Βερμούδες	Vermoúdes	Peter Bromby	Sailing
26	Vietnam	Βιετνάμ	Vietnám	Bui Thi Nhung	Athletics
27	Bolivia	Βολιβία	Volivía	Geovana Irusta	Athletics
28	Bosnia and Herzegovina	Βοσνία-Ερζεγοβίνη	Vosnía-Erzegovíni	Nedžad Fazlija	Shooting
29	Bulgaria	Βουλγαρία	Voulgaría	Mariya Grozdeva	Shooting
30	Brazil	Βραζιλία	Vrazilía	Torben Grael	Sailing
31	British Virgin Islands	Βρετανικές Παρθένοι Νήσοι	Vretanikés Parthénoi Nísoi	Dion Crabbe	Athletics
32	France	Γαλλία	Gallía	Jackson Richardson	Handball
33	Germany	Γερμανία	Germanía	Ludger Beerbaum	Equestrian
34	Georgia	Γεωργία	Georgía	Zurab Zviadauri	Judo
35	Gambia	Γκάμπια	Gámbia	Jaysuma Saidy Ndure	Athletics
36	Gabon	Γκαμπόν	Gabón	Mélanie Engoang	Judo
37	Ghana	Γκάνα	Gána	Andrew Owusu	Athletics
38	Guam	Γκουάμ	Gouám	Jeffrey Cobb	Wrestling
39	Guatemala	Γουατεμάλα	Gouatemála	Gisela Morales	Swimming
40	Guyana	Γουιάνα	Gouiána	Aliann Pompey	Athletics
41	Guinea	Γουινέα	Gouinéa	Nabie Foday Fofanah	Athletics
42	Guinea-Bissau	Γουινέα-Μπισσάου	Gouinéa-Bissáou	Leopoldina Ross	Wrestling
43	Grenada	Γρενάδα	Grenáda	Alleyne Francique	Athletics
44	Denmark	Δανία	Danía	Eskild Ebbesen	Rowing
45	Democratic Republic of the Congo	Λαϊκή Δημοκρατία του Κονγκό	Laïkí Dimokratía tou Kongó	Gary Kikaya	Athletics
46	Dominica	Δομίνικα	Domínika	Chris Lloyd	Athletics
47	Dominican Republic	Δομινικανή Δημοκρατία	Dominikaní Dimokratía	Francia Jackson	Volleyball
48	El Salvador	Ελ Σαλβαδόρ	El Salvadór	Evelyn García	Cycling
49	Switzerland	Ελβετία	Elvetía	Roger Federer	Tennis
50	Eritrea	Ερυθραία	Erythraía	Yonas Kifle	Athletics
51	Estonia	Εσθονία	Esthonía	Erki Nool	Athletics
52	Zambia	Ζάμπια	Zámbia	Davis Mwale	Boxing
53	Zimbabwe	Ζιμπάμπουε	Zimbáboue	Young Talkmore Nyongani	Athletics
54	United Arab Emirates	Ηνωμένα Αραβικά Εμιράτα	Inoména Araviká Emiráta	Saeed Al Maktoum	Shooting
55	United States of America	Ηνωμένες Πολιτείες Αμερικής	Inoménes Politeíes Amerikís	Dawn Staley	Basketball
56	Japan	Ιαπωνία	Iaponía	Kyoko Hamaguchi	Wrestling
57	India	Ινδία	Indía	Anju Bobby George	Athletics
58	Indonesia	Ινδονησία	Indonisía	Christian Hadinata	Badminton (coach) (Note: Krisna Bayu was originally appointed to be the flag bearer for Indonesia, but was unable to do so because of flu.)
59	Jordan	Ιορδανία	Iordanía	Khalil Al Hanahneh	Athletics
60	Iraq	Ιράκ	Irák	Hadir Lazame	Judo
61	Islamic Republic of Iran	Ισλαμική Δημοκρατία του Ιράν	Islamikí Dimokratía tou Irán	Arash Miresmaeli	Judo
62	Ireland	Ιρλανδία	Irlandía	Niall Griffin	Equestrian
63	Equatorial Guinea	Ισημερινή Γουινέα	Isimeriní Gouinéa	Emilia Mikue Ondo	Athletics
64	Ecuador	Ισημερινός	Isimerinós	Alexandra Escobar	Weightlifting
65	Iceland	Ισλανδία	Islandía	Gudmundur Hrafnkelsson	Handball
66	Spain	Ισπανία	Ispanía	Isabel Fernández	Judo
67	Israel	Ισραήλ	Israíl	Ariel Ze'evi	Judo
68	Italy	Ιταλία	Italía	Jury Chechi	Gymnastics
69	Kazakhstan	Καζακστάν	Kazakstán	Askhat Zhitkeyev	Judo
70	Cameroon	Καμερούν	Kameroún	Vencelas Dabaya	Weightlifting
71	Cambodia	Καμπότζη	Kambótzi	Hem Kiri	Swimming
72	Canada	Καναδάς	Kanadás	Nicolas Gill	Judo
73	Qatar	Κατάρ	Katár	Khaled Habash Al-Suwaidi	Athletics
74	Cayman Islands	Νήσοι Καϋμάν	Nísoi Kaÿmán	Cydonie Mothersille	Athletics
75	Central African Republic	Κεντροαφρικανική Δημοκρατία	Kendroafrikanikí Dimokratía	Ernest Ndjissipou	Athletics
76	Kenya	Κένυα	Kénya	Violet Barasa	Volleyball
77	People's Republic of China	Λαϊκή Δημοκρατία της Κίνας	Laïkí Dimokratía tis Kínas	Yao Ming	Basketball
78	Kyrgyzstan	Κιργιζιστάν	Kirgizistán	Mital Sharipov	Weightlifting
79	Kiribati	Κιριμπάτι	Kiribáti	Meamea Thomas	Weightlifting
80	Colombia	Κολομβία	Kolomvía	Carmenza Delgado	Weightlifting
81	Comoros	Κομόρες	Komóres	Hadhari Djaffar	Athletics
82	Congo	Κονγκό	Kongó	Rony Bakale	Swimming
83	Democratic People's Republic of Korea (PRK)	Λαοκρατική Δημοκρατία της Κορέας	Laokratikí Dimokratía tis Koréas	Kim Song-ho	Non-participant (NOC official)
83	Korea (KOR)	Κορέα	Koréa	Ku Min-jung	Volleyball
84	Costa Rica	Κόστα Ρίκα	Kósta Ríka	David Fernández	Judo
85	Cuba	Κούβα	Koúva	Iván Pedroso	Athletics
86	Kuwait	Κουβέιτ	Kouvéit	Fehaid Al-Deehani	Shooting
87	Cook Islands	Νήσοι Κουκ	Nísoi Kouk	Sam Nunuke Pera	Weightlifting
88	Croatia	Κροατία	Kroatía	Dubravko Šimenc	Water polo
89	Cyprus	Κύπρος	Kýpros	Georgios Achilleos	Shooting
90	Lao People's Democratic Republic	Λαϊκή Δημοκρατία του Λάος	Laïkí Dimokratía tou Láos	Chamleunesouk Ao Oudomphonh	Athletics
91	Lesotho	Λεσόθο	Lesótho	Lineo Mochesane	Taekwondo
92	Latvia	Λεττονία	Lettonía	Vadims Vasiļevskis	Athletics
93	Belarus	Λευκορωσία	Lefkorosía	Alexander Medved	Wrestling
94	Lebanon	Λίβανος	Lívanos	Jean Claude Rabbath	Athletics
95	Liberia	Λιβερία	Livería	Christopher Sayeh	Non-participant
96	Libyan Arab Jamahiriya	Λιβυκή Αραβική Τζαμαχαρία	Livykí Aravikí Tzamacharía	Mohamed Eshtiwi	Weightlifting
97	Lithuania	Λιθουανία	Lithouanía	Saulius Štombergas	Basketball
98	Liechtenstein	Λιχτενστάιν	Lichtenstáin	Oliver Geissmann	Shooting
99	Luxembourg	Λουξεμβούργο	Louxemvoúrgo	Claudine Schaul	Tennis
100	Madagascar	Μαδαγασκάρη	Madagaskári	Rosa Rakotozafy	Athletics
101	Malaysia	Μαλαισία	Malaisía	Bryan Nickson Lomas	Diving
102	Malawi	Μαλάουι	Maláoui	Kondwani Chiwina	Athletics
103	Maldives	Μαλδίβες	Maldíves	Sultan Saeed	Athletics
104	Mali	Μαλί	Malí	Kadiatou Camara	Athletics
105	Malta	Μάλτα	Málta	William Chetcuti	Shooting
106	Morocco	Μαρόκο	Maróko	Nezha Bidouane	Athletics
107	Mauritius	Μαυρίκιος	Mavríkios	Michael Medor	Boxing
108	Mauritania	Μαυριτανία	Mavritanía	Youba Hmeida	Athletics
109	Great Britain	Μεγάλη Βρετανία	Megáli Vretanía	Kate Howey	Judo
110	Mexico	Μεξικό	Mexikó	Fernando Platas	Diving
111	Federated States of Micronesia	Ομόσπονδες Πολιτείες της Μικρονησίας	Omóspondes Politeíes tis Mikronisías	Manuel Minginfel	Weightlifting
112	Mongolia	Μογγολία	Mongolía	Damdinsürengiin Nyamkhüü	Judo
113	Mozambique	Μοζαμβίκη	Mozamvíki	Kurt Couto	Athletics
114	Republic of Moldova	Μολδαβία	Moldavía	Oleg Moldovan	Shooting
115	Monaco	Μονακό	Monakó	Sébastien Gattuso	Athletics
116	Bangladesh	Μπαγκλαντές	Bangladés	Asif Hossain Khan	Shooting
117	Barbados	Μπαρμπάντος	Barbádos	Michael Maskell	Shooting
118	Bahamas	Μπαχάμες	Bachámes	Debbie Ferguson	Athletics
119	Bahrain	Μπαχρέιν	Bachréin	Ahmed Hamada Jassim	Athletics
120	Belize	Μπελίζε	Belíze	Emma Wade	Athletics
121	Benin	Μπενίν	Benín	Fabienne Feraez	Athletics
122	Botswana	Μποτσουάνα	Botsouána	Khumiso Ikgopoleng	Boxing
123	Burkina Faso	Μπουρκίνα Φάσο	Bourkína Fáso	Mamadou Ouedraogo	Swimming
124	Burundi	Μπουρούντι	Bouroúndi	Emery Nziyunvira	Swimming
125	Bhutan	Μπουτάν	Boután	Tshering Chhoden	Archery
126	Brunei Darussalam	Μπρουνέι	Brounéi	Jimmy Anak Ahar	Athletics
127	Myanmar	Μυανμάρ	Myanmár	U Hla Win	Weightlifting (coach)
128	Namibia	Ναμίμπια	Namíbia	Paulus Ambunda	Boxing
129	Nauru	Ναουρού	Naouroú	Yukio Peter	Weightlifting
130	New Zealand	Νέα Ζηλανδία	Néa Zilandía	Beatrice Faumuina	Athletics
131	Nepal	Νεπάλ	Nepál	Rajendra Bahadur Bhandari	Athletics
132	Niger	Νίγηρας	Nígiras	Abdou Alassane Dji Bo	Judo
133	Nigeria	Νιγηρία	Nigiría	Mary Onyali-Omagbemi	Athletics
134	Nicaragua	Νικαράγουα	Nikarágoua	Svitlana Kashchenko	Shooting
135	Norway	Νορβηγία	Norvigía	Harald Stenvaag	Shooting
136	South Africa	Νότιος Αφρική	Nótios Afrikí	Mbulaeni Mulaudzi	Athletics
137	Netherlands	Ολλανδία	Ollandía	Mark Huizinga	Judo
138	Netherlands Antilles	Ολλανδικές Αντίλλες	Ollandikés Antílles	Churandy Martina	Athletics
139	Oman	Ομάν	Omán	Hamoud Abdallah Al-Dalhami	Athletics
140	Honduras	Ονδούρα	Ondoúra	Iizzwa Medina	Table tennis
141	Hungary	Ουγγαρία	Oungaría	Antal Kovács	Judo
142	Uganda	Ουγκάντα	Ougánda	Joseph Lubega	Boxing
143	Uzbekistan	Ουζμπεκιστάν	Ouzbekistán	Abdullo Tangriev	Judo
144	Ukraine	Ουκρανία	Oukranía	Denys Sylantyev	Swimming
145	Uruguay	Ουρουγουάη	Ourougouái	Serrana Fernández	Swimming
146	Pakistan	Πακιστάν	Pakistán	Mohammad Nadeem	Field hockey
147	Palestine	Παλαιστίνη	Palaistíni	Sanna Abubkheet	Athletics
148	Palau	Παλάου	Paláou	John Tarkong	Wrestling
149	Panama	Παναμάς	Panamás	Eileen Coparropa	Swimming
150	Papua New Guinea	Παπούα-Νέα Γουινέα	Papoúa-Néa Gouinéa	Dika Toua	Weightlifting
151	Paraguay	Παραγουάη	Paragouái	Rocio Rivarola	Rowing
152	Virgin Islands	Παρθένοι Νήσοι	Parthénoi Nísoi	La Verne Jones	Athletics
153	Peru	Περού	Peroú	Francisco Boza	Shooting
154	Poland	Πολωνία	Polonía	Bartosz Kizierowski	Swimming
155	Portugal	Πορτογαλία	Portogalía	Nuno Delgado	Judo
156	Puerto Rico	Πουέρτο Ρίκο	Pouérto Ríko	Carlos Arroyo	Basketball
157	Former Yugoslav Republic of Macedonia	Πρώην Γιουγκοσλαβική Δημοκρατία της Μακεδονίας	Próin Giougoslavikí Dimokratía tis Makedonías	Blagoja Georgievski	Basketball (referee)
158	Rwanda	Ρουάντα	Rouánda	Mathias Ntawulikura	Athletics
159	Romania	Ρουμανία	Roumanía	Elisabeta Lipă	Rowing
160	Russian Federation	Ρωσική Ομοσπονδία	Rosikí Omospondia	Alexander Popov	Swimming
161	Saint Kitts and Nevis	Σαιντ Κιτς και Νέβις	Saint Kits kai Névis	Kim Collins	Athletics
162	Samoa	Σαμόα	Samóa	Uati Maposua	Weightlifting
163	São Tomé and Príncipe	Σάο Τομέ και Πρίνσιπε	Sáo Tomé kai Prínsipe	Fumilay Fonseca	Athletics
164	Saudi Arabia	Σαουδική Αραβία	Saoudikí Aravía	Hadi Soua An Al Somaily	Athletics
165	Senegal	Σενεγάλη	Senegáli	Malick Fall	Swimming
166	Serbia and Montenegro	Σερβία και Μαυροβούνιο	Servía kai Mavrovoúnio	Dejan Bodiroga	Basketball
167	Seychelles	Σεϋχέλλες	Seÿchélles	Allan Julie	Sailing
168	Singapore	Σιγκαπούρη	Singapoúri	Ronald Susilo	Badminton
169	Sierra Leone	Σιέρρα Λεόνε	Siérra Leóne	Hawanatu Bangura	Athletics
170	Slovakia	Σλοβακία	Slovakía	Michal Martikán	Canoeing
171	Slovenia	Σλοβενία	Slovenía	Beno Lapajne	Handball
172	Solomon Islands	Νήσοι Σολομώντος	Nísoi Solomóndos	Francis Manioru	Athletics
173	Somalia	Σομαλία	Somalía	Mohamed Ahmed Alim	Non-participant (head coach)
174	Swaziland	Σουαζιλάνδη	Souazilándi	Gcinile Moyane	Athletics
175	Sudan	Σουδάν	Soudán	Todd Matthews Jouda	Athletics
176	Sweden	Σουηδία	Souidía	Lars Frölander	Swimming
177	Suriname	Σουρινάμ	Sourinám	Letitia Vriesde	Athletics
178	Sri Lanka	Σρι Λάνκα	Sri Lánka	Susanthika Jayasinghe	Athletics
179	Syrian Arab Republic	Αραβική Δημοκρατία της Συρίας	Aravikí Dimokratía tis Syrías	Mohammad Hazzory	Athletics
180	Chinese Taipei	Κινεζική Ταϊπέι	Kinezikí Taïpéi	Chen Chih-yuan	Baseball
181	United Republic of Tanzania	Τανζανία	Tanzanía	Restituta Joseph	Athletics
182	Tajikistan	Τατζικιστάν	Tatzikistán	Nargis Nabieva	Archery
183	Thailand	Ταϊλάνδη	Tailándi	Paradorn Srichaphan	Tennis
184	Jamaica	Τζαμάικα	Tzamáika	Sandie Richards	Athletics
185	Djibouti	Τζιμπουτί	Tziboutí	Zeinab Mohamed Khaireh	Non-participant
186	Timor-Leste	Ανατολικό Τιμόρ	Anatolikó Timór	Agueda Amaral	Athletics
187	Tonga	Τόγκα	Tónga	Ma'afu Hawke	Boxing
188	Togo	Τόγκο	Tógo	Jan Sekpona	Athletics
189	Turkey	Τουρκία	Tourkía	Ali Enver Adakan	Sailing
190	Turkmenistan	Τουρκμενιστάν	Tourkmenistán	Shohrat Kurbanov	Boxing
191	Trinidad and Tobago	Τρινιντάντ και Τομπάγκο	Trinidád kai Tobágo	Ato Boldon	Athletics
192	Chad	Τσαντ	Tsad	Kaltouma Nadjina	Athletics
193	Czech Republic	Δημοκρατία της Τσεχίας	Dimokratía tis Tsechías	Květoslav Svoboda	Swimming
194	Tunisia	Τυνησία	Tynisía	Noureddine Hfaiedh	Volleyball
195	Yemen	Υεμένη	Yeméni	Akram Abdullah	Taekwondo
196	Philippines	Φιλιππίνες	Filippínes	Romeo Brin (Note: Christopher Camat was appointed to be the flag bearer for the Philippines, but Brin replaced him as the former decided to see action the day after the opening ceremonies.)	Boxing
197	Finland	Φινλανδία	Finlandía	Thomas Johanson	Sailing
198	Fiji	Φίτζι	Fítzi	Sisilia Nasiga	Judo
199	Chile	Χιλή	Chilí	Kristel Köbrich	Swimming
200	Hong Kong, China	Χονγκ Κονγκ, Κίνα	Chong Kong, Kína	Sherry Tsai	Swimming
201	Greece	Ελλάς	Ellás	Pyrros Dimas	Weightlifting

== See also ==
- 2008 Summer Olympics national flag bearers
- 2008 Summer Paralympics national flag bearers
- 2010 Winter Olympics national flag bearers
