= Indonesia at the 2004 Summer Olympics =

- IOC code: INA
- NOC: Indonesian Olympic Committee
- Website: www.nocindonesia.or.id (in Indonesian)

in Athens
- Competitors: 38 in 14 sports
- Flag bearer: Christian Hadinata
- Medals Ranked 48th: Gold 1 Silver 1 Bronze 2 Total 4

Summer Olympics appearances (overview)
- 1952; 1956; 1960; 1964; 1968; 1972; 1976; 1980; 1984; 1988; 1992; 1996; 2000; 2004; 2008; 2012; 2016; 2020; 2024

Indonesia competed at the 2004 Summer Olympics in Athens, Greece, from 13 to 29 August 2004. This was the nation's twelfth appearance at the Olympics, excluding the 1964 Summer Olympics in Tokyo, and the 1980 Summer Olympics in Moscow because of the United States boycott. Krisna Bayu was originally the flag bearer, however the role was later done by Christian Hadinata because Bayu was suffering from flu at the eve of opening ceremony.

== Medalists ==
Medal	Name	Sport	Event	Date
Gold	Taufik Hidayat	Badminton	Men's singles	August 21
Silver	Raema Lisa Rumbewas	Weightlifting	Women's 53 kg	August 15
Bronze	Eng Hian; Flandy Limpele	Badminton	Men's doubles	August 20
Bronze	Sony Dwi Kuncoro	Badminton	Men's singles	August 21

Medals by sport
Sport	1st place, gold medalist(s)	2nd place, silver medalist(s)	3rd place, bronze medalist(s)	Total
Badminton	1	0	2	3
Weightlifting	0	1	0	1
Total	1	1	2	4

Medals by gender
Gender	1st place, gold medalist(s)	2nd place, silver medalist(s)	3rd place, bronze medalist(s)	Total
Female	0	1	0	1
Male	1	0	2	3
Mixed	0	0	0	0
Total	1	1	2	4

Medals by date
Date	1st place, gold medalist(s)	2nd place, silver medalist(s)	3rd place, bronze medalist(s)	Total
15 August	0	1	0	1
20 August	0	0	1	1
21 August	1	0	1	2
Total	1	1	2	4

== Competitors ==
The following is the list of number of competitors participating in the Games:

Sport	Men	Women	Total
Archery	1	1	2
Athletics	1	1	2
Badminton	10	4	14
Boxing	1	0	1
Canoeing	0	1	1
Cycling	0	1	1
Judo	1	0	1
Rowing	0	1	1
Sailing	1	0	1
Shooting	0	1	1
Swimming	3	0	3
Taekwondo	1	1	2
Tennis	0	2	2
Weightlifting	3	3	6
Total	22	16	38

== Archery ==
Two Indonesian archers qualified each for the men's and women's individual archery.

Athlete	Event	Ranking round		Round of 64	Round of 32	Round of 16	Quarterfinals	Semifinals	Final / BM	
Athlete	Event	Score	Seed	Opposition Score	Opposition Score	Opposition Score	Opposition Score	Opposition Score	Opposition Score	Rank
Lockoneco	Men's individual	641	41	Frangilli (ITA); L 141–153	Did not advance					
Rina Dewi Puspitasari	Women's individual	616	46	Nichols (USA); L 141–160	Did not advance					

== Athletics ==
Indonesian athletes have so far achieved qualifying standards in the following athletics events (up to a maximum of 3 athletes in each event at the 'A' Standard, and 1 at the 'B' Standard).

Key

- Note–Ranks given for track events are within the athlete's heat only
- Q = Qualified for the next round
- q = Qualified for the next round as a fastest loser or, in field events, by position without achieving the qualifying target
- NR = National record
- N/A = Round not applicable for the event
- Bye = Athlete not required to compete in round

Men

Athlete	Event	Heat		Quarterfinal		Semifinal		Final	
Athlete	Event	Result	Rank	Result	Rank	Result	Rank	Result	Rank
Edy Jakariya	110 m hurdles	14.11 NR	8	Did not advance					

Women

Athlete	Event	Heat		Final	
Athlete	Event	Result	Rank	Result	Rank
Supriyati Sutono	5000 m	16:34.14	19	Did not advance	

== Badminton ==
Men

Athlete	Event	Round of 32	Round of 16	Quarterfinal	Semifinal	Final / BM	
Athlete	Event	Opposition Score	Opposition Score	Opposition Score	Opposition Score	Opposition Score	Rank
Sony Dwi Kuncoro	Singles	Hashim (MAS); W 15–6, 9–15, 15–8	Andersen (NOR); W 15–7, 15–6	Park (KOR); W 15–13, 15–4	Shon (KOR); L 6–15, 15–9, 9–15	Ponsana (THA); W 15–11, 17–16	3rd place, bronze medalist(s)
Taufik Hidayat	Singles	Yamada (JPN); W 15–8, 15–10	Wong (MAS); W 11–15, 15–7, 15–9	Gade (DEN); W 15–12, 15–12	Ponsana (THA); W 15–9, 15–2	Shon (KOR); W 15–8, 15–7	1st place, gold medalist(s)
Luluk Hadiyanto; Alvent Yulianto	Doubles	Bye	Lee / Yoo (KOR); L 11–15, 10–15	Did not advance			
Eng Hian; Flandy Limpele	Doubles	Bye	Clark / Robertson (GBR); W 15–7, 15–12	Kim / Yim (KOR); W 15–1, 15–10	Kim / Ha (KOR); L 8–15, 2–15	Eriksen / Hansen (DEN); W 15–13, 15–7	3rd place, bronze medalist(s)
Sigit Budiarto; Tri Kusharjanto	Doubles	Łogosz / Mateusiak (POL); L 11–15, 15–3, 8–15	Did not advance				

Women

Athlete	Event	Round of 32	Round of 16	Quarterfinal	Semifinal	Final / BM	
Athlete	Event	Opposition Score	Opposition Score	Opposition Score	Opposition Score	Opposition Score	Rank
Jo Novita; Lita Nurlita	Doubles	Bye	Yang / Zhang (CHN); L 2–15, 15–6, 7–15	Did not advance			

Mixed

Athlete	Event	Round of 32	Round of 16	Quarterfinal	Semifinal	Final / BM	
Athlete	Event	Opposition Score	Opposition Score	Opposition Score	Opposition Score	Opposition Score	Rank
Nova Widianto; Vita Marissa	Doubles	Bye	Blair / Munt (GBR); W 15–8, 15–12	Eriksen / Schjoldager (DEN); L 12–15, 8–15	Did not advance		
Anggun Nugroho; Eny Widiowati	Doubles	Zuyev / Yakusheva (RUS); W 12–15, 15–7, 15–5	Chen / Zhao (CHN); L 2–15, 3–15	Did not advance			

== Boxing ==
Indonesia sent one boxer to the 2004 Summer Olympics.

Athlete	Event	Round of 32	Round of 16	Quarterfinals	Semifinals	Final	
Athlete	Event	Opposition Result	Opposition Result	Opposition Result	Opposition Result	Opposition Result	Rank
Bonyx Yusak Saweho	Flyweight	Rżany (POL); L 19–25	Did not advance				

== Canoeing ==
Sprint

Athlete	Event	Heats		Semifinals		Final	
Athlete	Event	Time	Rank	Time	Rank	Time	Rank
Sarce Aronggear	Women's K-1 500 m	2:03.790	8	Did not advance			

Qualification Legend: Q = Qualify to final; q = Qualify to semifinal

== Cycling ==
=== Track ===
Points race

Athlete	Event	Points	Laps	Rank
Santia Tri Kusuma	Women's points race	Did not finish		

== Judo ==
Indonesia has qualified a single judoka.

Athlete	Event	Round of 32	Round of 16	Quarterfinals	Semifinals	Repechage 1	Repechage 2	Repechage 3	Final / BM	
Athlete	Event	Opposition Result	Opposition Result	Opposition Result	Opposition Result	Opposition Result	Opposition Result	Opposition Result	Opposition Result	Rank
Krisna Bayu	Men's −90 kg	Ochirbat (MGL); L 0001–0101	Did not advance							

== Rowing ==
Indonesian rowers qualified the following boats:

Women

Athlete	Event	Heats		Repechage		Semifinals		Final	
Athlete	Event	Time	Rank	Time	Rank	Time	Rank	Time	Rank
Pere Koroba	Single sculls	8:04.76	5 R	7:54.17	3 SC/D	8:09.21	3 FC	7:47.92	16

Qualification Legend: FA=Final A (medal); FB=Final B (non-medal); FC=Final C (non-medal); FD=Final D (non-medal); FE=Final E (non-medal); FF=Final F (non-medal); SA/B=Semifinals A/B; SC/D=Semifinals C/D; SE/F=Semifinals E/F; R=Repechage

== Sailing ==
Indonesian sailors have qualified one boat for each of the following events.

Men

Athlete	Event	Race											Net points	Final rank
Athlete	Event	1	2	3	4	5	6	7	8	9	10	M*	Net points	Final rank
I Gusti Made Oka Sulaksana	Mistral	18	19	19	12	25	10	21	~~26~~	14	17	12	167	18

M = Medal race; OCS = On course side of the starting line; DSQ = Disqualified; DNF = Did not finish; DNS= Did not start; RDG = Redress given

== Shooting ==
Women

Athlete	Event	Qualification		Final	
Athlete	Event	Points	Rank	Points	Rank
Yosheefin Prasasti	10 m air rifle	392	=22	Did not advance	

== Swimming ==
Men

Athlete	Event	Heat		Semifinal		Final	
Athlete	Event	Time	Rank	Time	Rank	Time	Rank
Andy Wibowo	100 m butterfly	56.86	54	Did not advance			
Albert Sutanto	200 m individual medley	2:07.55	40	Did not advance			
Donny Utomo	200 m butterfly	2:05.71	33	Did not advance			

== Taekwondo ==
Indonesia has qualified two taekwondo jin.

Athlete	Event	Round of 16	Quarterfinals	Semifinals	Repechage 1	Repechage 2	Final / BM	
Athlete	Event	Opposition Result	Opposition Result	Opposition Result	Opposition Result	Opposition Result	Opposition Result	Rank
Satriyo Rahadhani	Men's −58 kg	Green (GBR); L 5–6	Did not advance					
Juana Wangsa Putri	Women's −49 kg	Mora (COL); L 2–2 SUP	Did not advance					

== Tennis ==
Athlete	Event	Round of 64	Round of 32	Round of 16	Quarterfinals	Semifinals	Final / BM	
Athlete	Event	Opposition Score	Opposition Score	Opposition Score	Opposition Score	Opposition Score	Opposition Score	Rank
Angelique Widjaja	Women's singles	Tanasugarn (THA); W 1–6, 6–2, 6–1	Šprem (CRO); L 3–6, 1–6	Did not advance				
Wynne Prakusya; Angelique Widjaja	Women's doubles	—N/a	Kostanić / Šprem (CRO); L 3–6, 2–6	Did not advance				

== Weightlifting ==
Six Indonesian weightlifters qualified for the following events:

Men

Athlete	Event	Snatch		Clean & Jerk		Total	Rank
Athlete	Event	Result	Rank	Result	Rank	Total	Rank
Jadi Setiadi	−56 kg	117.5	=9	145	=8	262.5	8
Gustar Junianto	−62 kg	132.5	7	160	=5	292.5	5
Sunarto Rasidi	−62 kg	125.0	11	160	=5	285.0	8

Women

Athlete	Event	Snatch		Clean & Jerk		Total	Rank
Athlete	Event	Result	Rank	Result	Rank	Total	Rank
Rosmainar	−48 kg	~~80.0~~	DNF	—	—	—	DNF
Raema Lisa Rumbewas	−53 kg	95.0	2	115.0	2	210.0	2nd place, silver medalist(s)
Patmawati Abdul Wahid	−58 kg	95.0	=6	117.5	=10	212.5	8

== See also ==
- 2004 Olympic Games
- 2004 Paralympic Games
- Indonesia at the Olympics
- Indonesia at the Paralympics
- Indonesia at the 2004 Summer Paralympics
