= Taekwondo at the 2004 Summer Olympics =

Taekwondo at the Games of the XXVIII Olympiad
- Venue: Sports Pavilion at the Faliro Coastal Zone Olympic Complex
- Dates: August 25 to August 28, 2004
- Competitors: 124 from 60 nations

Taekwondo at the 2004 Summer Olympics were held in the Sports Pavilion at the Faliro Coastal Zone Olympic Complex in Athens, Greece where 124 competitors competed in eight events, four each for men and women.

== Medal summary ==
The host nation Greece failed to add to the gold won by Michalis Mouroutsos at the 2000 Summer Olympics in Sydney, though Alexandros Nikolaidis and Elisavet Mystakidou both won silver. Chinese Taipei (i.e. Taiwan) won its first two gold medals ever at these events. Steven López of the United States and Chen Zhong of China each repeated as Olympic champions. Hadi Saei, Huang Chih-hsiung and Pascal Gentil also won medal for the second time.

=== Men's events ===
Event	Gold	Silver	Bronze
Flyweight (58 kg)	Chu Mu-Yen; Chinese Taipei	Oscar Salazar; Mexico	Tamer Bayoumi; Egypt
Lightweight (68 kg)	Hadi Saei; Iran	Huang Chih-hsiung; Chinese Taipei	Song Myeong-Seob; South Korea
Middleweight (80 kg)	Steven López; United States	Bahri Tanrıkulu; Turkey	Yousef Karami; Iran
Heavyweight (+80 kg)	Moon Dae-Sung; South Korea	Alexandros Nikolaidis; Greece	Pascal Gentil; France

=== Women's events ===
Event	Gold	Silver	Bronze
Flyweight (49 kg)	Chen Shih-Hsin; Chinese Taipei	Yanelis Labrada; Cuba	Yaowapa Boorapolchai; Thailand
Lightweight (57 kg)	Jang Ji-Won; South Korea	Nia Abdallah; United States	Iridia Salazar; Mexico
Middleweight (67 kg)	Luo Wei; China	Elisavet Mystakidou; Greece	Hwang Kyung-Sun; South Korea
Heavyweight (+67 kg)	Chen Zhong; China	Myriam Baverel; France	Adriana Carmona; Venezuela

== Medal table ==
* Host nation (Greece)

Rank	Nation	Gold	Silver	Bronze	Total
1	Chinese Taipei	2	1	0	3
2	South Korea	2	0	2	4
3	China	2	0	0	2
4	United States	1	1	0	2
5	Iran	1	0	1	2
6	Greece*	0	2	0	2
7	France	0	1	1	2
7	Mexico	0	1	1	2
9	Cuba	0	1	0	1
9	Turkey	0	1	0	1
11	Egypt	0	0	1	1
11	Thailand	0	0	1	1
11	Venezuela	0	0	1	1
Totals (13 entries)		8	8	8	24

== Participating nations ==
A total of 124 taekwondo jins from 60 nations competed at the Athens Games:

- Argentina (2)
- Australia (4)
- Austria (2)
- Azerbaijan (2)
- Belgium (1)
- Bosnia and Herzegovina (1)
- Brazil (3)
- Canada (2)
- Central African Republic (1)
- China (2)
- Colombia (3)
- Costa Rica (1)
- Ivory Coast (1)
- Croatia (2)
- Cuba (1)
- Denmark (2)
- Dominican Republic (1)
- Egypt (4)
- Finland (1)
- France (4)
- Great Britain (4)
- Greece (4)
- Guatemala (3)
- Haiti (1)
- Indonesia (2)
- Iran (2)
- Iraq (1)
- Israel (1)
- Italy (3)
- Japan (1)
- Jordan (2)
- Kazakhstan (2)
- Lesotho (1)
- Libya (1)
- Malaysia (1)
- Mexico (3)
- Morocco (3)
- Nepal (1)
- Netherlands (2)
- New Zealand (1)
- Nigeria (3)
- Norway (1)
- Philippines (3)
- Poland (1)
- Puerto Rico (1)
- Russia (2)
- South Africa (1)
- South Korea (4)
- Spain (4)
- Chinese Taipei (4)
- Thailand (4)
- Trinidad and Tobago (1)
- Tunisia (3)
- Turkey (1)
- Ukraine (1)
- United States (2)
- Uzbekistan (2)
- Venezuela (4)
- Vietnam (2)
- Yemen (1)
