= Nevena Lukic =

Austrian taekwondo practitioner

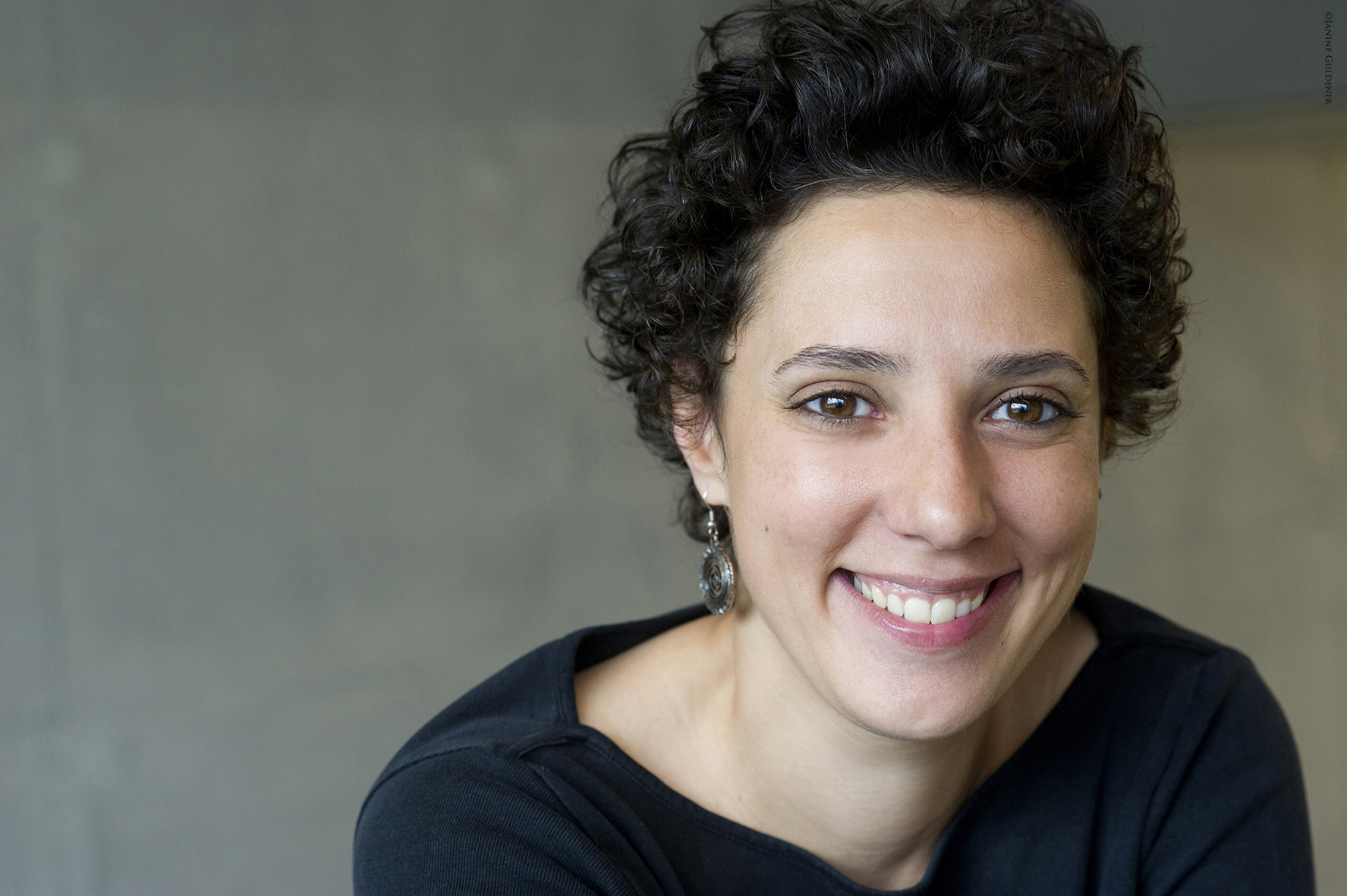

Personal information
- Full name: Nevena Lukic
- Nationality: Austria
- Born: 16 August 1981 (age 45) Innsbruck, Austria

Sport
- Sport: Taekwondo
Medal record
Women's taekwondo
Representing Austria
World Championships
Bronze medal – third place	2005 Madrid	51 kg
European Championships
Gold medal – first place	2004 Lillehammer	51 kg

Nevena Lukic (born 16 August 1981 in Innsbruck) is an Austrian taekwondo practitioner, who competed in the women's flyweight category. She picked up a total of eight medals in her career, including a gold from the 2004 European Championships in Lillehammer, Norway, and a bronze from the 2005 World Taekwondo Championships in Madrid, Spain, and represented her nation Austria at the 2004 Summer Olympics. Lukic is also a full-fledged member of the Austrian taekwondo squad in her native Innsbruck,

Lukic emerged herself in the sporting headlines at the 2004 European Championships in Lillehammer, Norway, where she dispatched Spain's Jennifer Delgado 5–2 in the final to seal her first senior career title in the women's flyweight division.

At the 2004 Summer Olympics in Athens, Lukic qualified for the Austrian squad in the women's flyweight class (49 kg), by placing third and granting a berth from the European Olympic Qualifying Tournament in Baku, Azerbaijan. Lukic got off to a flying start with an impressive 4–0 victory over Lesotho's Lineo Mochesane in the opening match, but she immediately lost the quarterfinal to her Guatemalan opponent Euda Carías on the referees' decision after their fight ended in a 1–1 draw.

Following her dismal display at the Olympics, Lukic recovered from her setback in Athens to grab a bronze medal over China's Wang Ying in the same division at the 2005 World Taekwondo Championships in Madrid, Spain.
