= Gladys Mora =

Colombian taekwondo practitioner

Personal information
- Full name: Gladys Alicia Mora Romero
- Nationality: Colombia
- Citizenship: Colombian, American
- Born: 31 July 1980 (age 46) Barranquilla, Colombia
- Education: Psychologist degree and Master degree in Human resources
- Height: 1.70 m (5 ft 7 in)
- Weight: 49 kg (108 lb)

Sport
- Sport: Taekwondo
- Event: 49 kg
- Coached by: Yolman sanchez

Achievements and titles
- Olympic finals: Athens 2004. semifinals.
- National finals: from 1999 to 2012
- Highest world ranking: 9th
Medal record
4th place Athens 2004. Olympic diploma.; 9th place Beijing 2008; 1rs place panamerican taekwondo championship. Argentina 2006.; 1rs place panamerican qualification championship. Cali Colombia 2007. Qualified to the olympics Beijing 2008.; Special recognition athlete off the year 2004. Winner.; Multiple times panamerican medalist.; National champion 1999 to 2012.; 5th place word championship. France 2003.
Women's taekwondo
Representing Colombia
Central American and Caribbean Games
Silver medal – second place	2006 Cartagena	51 kg

Gladys Alicia Mora Romero (born July 31, 1980, in Barranquilla) is a Colombian taekwondo practitioner. She is a two-time Olympian, and a four-time medalist at the Pan American Taekwondo Championships. She also won a bronze medal for the 51 kg class at the 2006 Central American and Caribbean Games in Cartagena, Colombia.

Mora made her official debut for the 2004 Summer Olympics in Athens, where she competed in the women's flyweight category (49 kg). She first defeated Indonesia's Juana Wangsa Putri by a superiority decision in the preliminary rounds, before losing out her next match to Chinese Taipei's Chen Shih-Hsin, with a sudden death score of 0–1. Because her opponent advanced further into the final match, Mora took advantage of the repechage rounds by defeating Nepal's Sangina Baidya and Guatemala's Euda Carías. She progressed to the bronze medal match, but narrowly lost the medal to Thailand's Yaowapa Boorapolchai, with a score of 1–2.

At the 2008 Summer Olympics, Mora qualified for the second time in the women's 49 kg class, after winning the championship title from the Pan American Qualification Tournament in Cali, Colombia. Unfortunately, she lost the first preliminary round match to another Chinese Taipei taekwondo practitioner Yang Shu-Chun, with a score of 0–(-1).

== Medal count ==
	gold	Silver	Bronze	PAR	Σ
Olympic Games				2	2
World Championships				4	4
Olympic Games qualification World				2	2
Student World Championships				1	1
Continental Tournaments	2	1	3	2	8
Open Tournaments	1	3	1		5

=== Results international ===
result	year	tournament	city	weight	category		
PAR	1999	World Championships	Edmonton	-51	senior	10.00	0
3.	2002	Pan American Championships	Quito	-51	senior	10.00	3
PAR	2003	Olympic Games qualification World	Paris	-49	senior	7.00	0
3.	2004	Olympic Games qualification Pan America	Querétaro	-49	senior	10.00	9
PAR	2004	Olympic Games	Athen	-49	senior	20.00	15
PAR	2004	Pan American Championships	Santo Domingo	-51	senior	6.00	0
PAR	2005	World Championships	Madrid	-51	senior	10.00	5
3.	2006	US Open	Dallas, Texas	-51	senior	3.00	0
PAR	2006	Student World Championships	Valencia	-51	senior	2.00	0
1.	2006	Pan American Championships	Buenos Aires	-51	senior	30.00	12
2.	2007	US Open	Orlando	-51	senior	5.00	0
PAR	2007	World Championships	Peking	-51	senior	10.00	5
PAR	2007	Pan Am Games	Rio de Janeiro	-49	senior	6.00	3
PAR	2007	Olympic Games qualification World	Manchester	-49	senior	7.00	3
1.	2007	Olympic Games qualification Pan America	Cali	-49	senior	30.00	3
2.	2008	Spanish Open	Alicante	-51	senior	5.00	0
2.	2008	Austrian Open	Innsbruck	-51	senior	5.00	0
PAR	2008	Olympic Games	Beijing	-49	senior	20.00	0
2.	2008	Pan American Championships	Cagus	-51	senior	20.00	6
1.	2009	Costa Rica Open	Cartago	-53	senior	7.00	0
PAR	2009	World Championships	Kopenhagen	-53	senior	10.00	0
3.	2012	Pan American Championships	Sucre	-53	senior	10.00	6

Olympic Games qualification Pan America, Querétaro -49 senior
3rd place Fight	MORA ROMERO, Gladys Alicia	4	:	0	SOLANO, Johana
1/08-Finale	MORA ROMERO, Gladys Alicia	2	:	0	SEGURA MOORE, Barbara
1/04-Finale	MORA ROMERO, Gladys Alicia	2	:	0	CONTRERAS LOYOLA, Yeny
1/02-Finale	GONDA, Ivett	4	:	1	MORA ROMERO, Gladys Alicia
Olympic Games, Athen -49 senior
3rd place Fight	BOORAPOLCHAI, Yaowapa	2	:	1	MORA ROMERO, Gladys Alicia
1/08-Finale	MORA ROMERO, Gladys Alicia	2	:	2	WANGSA PUTRI, Juana
1/04-Trostrunde	MORA ROMERO, Gladys Alicia	5	:	1	BAIDYA, Sangina
1/04-Finale	CHEN, Shih-Hsin	1	:	0	MORA ROMERO, Gladys Alicia
1/02-Trostrunde	MORA ROMERO, Gladys Alicia	2	:	0	CARIAS MORALES, Euda Maria

Pan American Championships, Buenos Aires -51 senior Trainer / Coaches: SALAZAR MOLINA, Reynaldo (Headcoach) SANCHEZ, Yolman (coach) FORERO, Rene (Assistantcoach)
1/08-Finale	MORA ROMERO, Gladys Alicia	10	:	3	SEPULVEDA, Lorena
1/04-Finale	MORA ROMERO, Gladys Alicia	7	:	0	DIEZ CANSECO VERDE, Lizbeth Julissa
1/02-Finale	MORA ROMERO, Gladys Alicia	10	:	4	DeVITO, Simone
1/01-Finale	MORA ROMERO, Gladys Alicia	7	:	6	GUACARE, Gladys

Pan American Championships, Cagus -51 senior
1/16-Finale	MORA ROMERO, Gladys Alicia	7	:	0	COTO VARGAS, Nancy
1/02-Finale	MORA ROMERO, Gladys Alicia	5	:	0	TURCOTTE, Annie-Pier
1/01-Finale	CRAIG, Charlotte	1	:	0	MORA ROMERO, Gladys Alicia

Pan American Championships, Sucre -53 senior
1/08-Finale	MORA ROMERO, Gladys Alicia	4	:	2	STAMBAUGH, Victoria
1/04-Finale	MORA ROMERO, Gladys Alicia	8	:	1	GUADALUPE, Katherine
1/02-Finale	DeVITO, Simone	5	:	4	MORA ROMERO, Gladys Alicia
