= Sangina Baidya =

Nepalese taekwondo practitioner

Personal information
- Full name: Sangina Baidya (संगिना बैद्य)
- Born: 29 December 1974 (age 51) Kathmandu, Nepal
- Height: 1.61 m (5 ft 3 1/2 in)

Sport
- Sport: Taekwondo
- Event: Kyorugi
- Coached by: Nastu Bahadur Bisural
Medal record
Women's taekwondo
Representing Nepal
Asian Taekwondo Championships
Gold medal – first place	Melbourne, Australia	47 kg
Silver medal – second place	Manila, Philippines	47 kg
Bronze medal – third place	Hong Kong	51 kg
South Asian Games
Gold medal – first place	1999 Kathmandu
Gold medal – first place	2004 Islamabad
Taekwondo at the 2004 Summer Olympics – Qualification
Bronze medal – third place	2004, Bangkok, Thailand

Sangina Baidya (Nepali: संगिना बैद्य) (born 29 December 1974, in Kathmandu) is a retired Nepalese taekwondo practitioner, who competed in the women's flyweight category. She won the gold medal in the Flyweight−47 kg division at the 1996 Asian Taekwondo Championships in Melbourne, Australia.She retrieved a bronze medal in the 51-kg division at the 2000 Asian Taekwondo Championships in Hong Kong, China, and attained a seventh-place finish at the 2004 Summer Olympics, representing her nation Nepal. Before her sporting career ended in 2009, Baidya trained for Central Dojang Taekwondo Club in her native Kathmandu, under her personal coach Nastu Bahadur Bisural.

== Career ==
Baidya played taekwondo for a long time as an athlete in the Nepal Taekwondo Association. She started practicing taekwondo at the age of sixteen. Since then, she has obtained a total of ten national championship titles, and won fourteen medals (ten golds, a silver, and three bronzes) in twenty international tournaments between 1992 and 2001. Moreover, Baidya became a quarterfinalist in the women's flyweight class at the 1995 World Taekwondo Championships in Manila, Philippines, and accepted several prestigious awards for her full dedication to the sport, including three as the sportswoman of the year by Nepal Sports Journalist Forum (1996, 1997, and 2003).

Holding her distinction of becoming the nation's first ever taekwondo squad, Baidya qualified for the Nepalese squad in the women's flyweight class (49 kg) at the 2004 Summer Olympics in Athens. Earlier in the process, she placed third and booked her place on the Nepalese team from the Asian Olympic Qualifying Tournament in Bangkok, Thailand. She crashed out in an immediate 0–4 defeat to Chinese Taipei's Chen Shih-hsin in her opening match, but slipped directly into the repechage bracket for her chance of Nepal's first Olympic medal in history, following Chen's progress towards the final. In the repechage, Baidya fell short in her first playoff to Colombia's Gladys Mora with a 0–4 decision and a disputable one-point deduction for landing a kick on her opponent's head, relegating Baidya to seventh.
