= Faliro Coastal Zone Olympic Complex =

Complex in Athens, Greece

The Faliro Coastal Zone Olympic Sports Complex is a complex in the coastal zone of Piraeus, Greece. It consists of two indoor arenas and a beach volleyball stadium, and it hosted Handball, Taekwondo, and volleyball events at the 2004 Summer Olympics. The complex is located in Faliro, Attica.

The complex consists of the following venues:

== Peace and Friendship Stadium ==
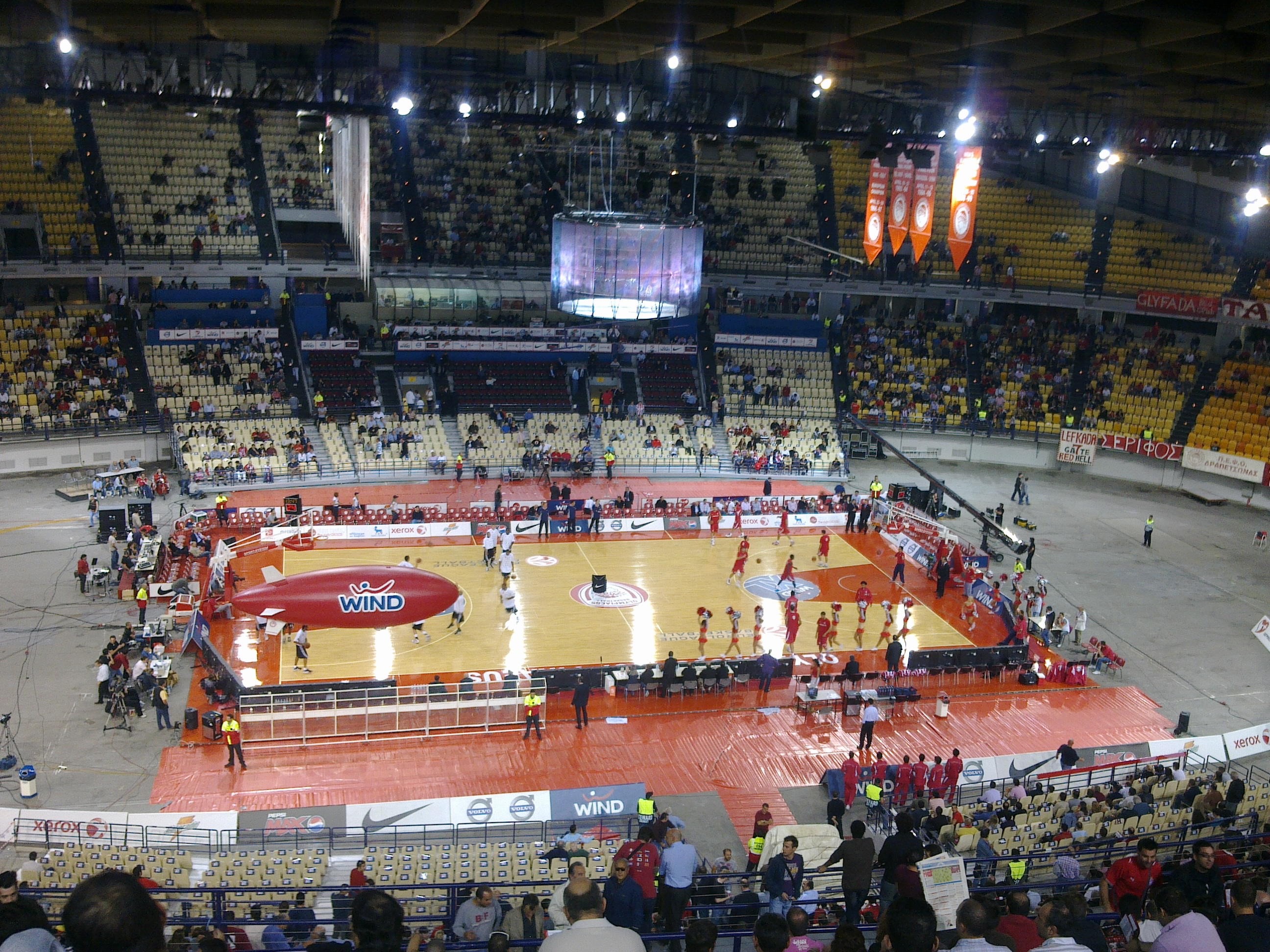
Inside the Peace and Friendship Stadium, Piraeus.

The Peace and Friendship Stadium SEF, known as S.E.F. is an indoor arena located in Faliro, Athens that hosted indoor volleyball at the 2004 Summer Olympics in Athens, Greece.

The arena which was built in 1981 and it opened in 1985 had previously hosted various major international events, including the Final tournament of the 1987 Men's European Basketball Championships and preliminary games of the 1998 FIBA World Basketball Championships.

Renovations for the Olympics commenced in April 2002 and were completed on June 30, 2004. The new stadium was officially opened on August 11, 2004, shortly before the opening of the games. The venue's current regular seating capacity is 14,940 seats, while the regular capacity was 17,000 seats before the 2004 Summer Olympics renovation.

However, for home playoff matches of the Olympiacos basketball club, for which the SEF arena is their regular home court, the seating capacity can be increased to 16,000-17,000 with temporary seating.

== Sports Pavilion ==
Faliro Sports Pavilion Arena.

The Faliro Sports Pavilion Arena (37°56′09.94″N 23°41′27.91″E) is an indoor arena in Palaio Faliro, in Attica, Greece. It was the site of preliminary matches in handball and the taekwondo competition in the 2004 Summer Olympics at Athens. The arena was completed on December 20, 2003, and officially opened on August 12, 2004, shortly before the Olympics. The arena seats 8,536, though only 5,800 seats were publicly available during the Olympics.

== After the games ==
The Peace & Friendship Stadium is used by Olympiacos Basketball Club (as it was before the Olympics) and regularly holds crowds of up to 14,905 fans, especially for Euroleague basketball games.

Some of the facilities are presently in use or in the process of being converted for post-Olympics use, as shown below:

Facility	Olympics Use	Current/Proposed Use
Peace and Friendship Stadium, Piraeus	Volleyball	Home court for Olympiacos BC (basketball), Concerts, Conventions and trade shows
