= Yanelis Labrada =

Cuban taekwondo practitioner

Personal information
- Born: October 8, 1981 (age 44) Manzanillo, Granma Province, Cuba

Sport
- Sport: Taekwondo
Medal record
Representing Cuba
Women's taekwondo
Olympic Games
Silver medal – second place	2004 Athens	49 kg
World Championships
Silver medal – second place	2003 Garmisch-Partenkirchen	–51kg
Pan American Games
Gold medal – first place	2003 Santo Domingo	49 kg
Summer Universiade
Bronze medal – third place	2005 Izmir	55 kg

Yanelis Yuliet Labrada Diaz (born October 8, 1981) is a taekwondo silver medalist from Cuba in the Women's Under 49 kg event at the 2004 Summer Olympics.

Diaz defeated Yaowapa Boorapolchai of Thailand in the quarter-finals and Euda Carias of Guatemala in the semifinals but was defeated in the finals by Chen Shih-hsin of Taiwan to win the silver medal.

Diaz won a silver medal at the 2003 World Taekwondo Championships and a bronze medal at the 2004 World Olympic Qualification Tournament.

== See also ==
- List of Olympic medalists in taekwondo
