= Taekwondo weight classes =

In taekwondo, a weight class is a standardized weight range for taekwondo practitioners. The upper weight limit for each class is the maximum weight for that lass. The minimum weight for each class must be above the maximum weight for the next lowest class. A taekwondo gyeorugi is usually scheduled for a fixed weight class, and each practitioner's weight must exceed the lower limit, and must not exceed the upper limit.

== Senior weight classes ==
Most of the domestic / international taekwondo competitions for senior [editor's note:define "senior"] practitioners have traditionally consisted of 16 weight classes, eight for men and eight for women.

Weight class	Men	Women
Weight class	Weight limit kg (lb)	Weight limit kg (lb)
Heavyweight	unlimited	unlimited
Middleweight	87 (191.8)	73 (160.9)
Welterweight	80 (176.4)	67 (147.7)
Lightweight	74 (163.1)	62 (136.7)
Featherweight	68 (149.9)	57 (125.7)
Bantamweight	63 (138.9)	53 (116.8)
Flyweight	58 (127.9)	49 (108.0)
Finweight	54 (119.0)	46 (101.4)

== Olympic weight classes ==
Since the International Olympic Committee limits the total number of taekwondo entrants to 64 men and 64 women, there are only eight weight classes - four for each gender - at the Summer Olympics, and the Pan American Games as well.

Weight class	Men	Women
Weight class	Weight limit kg (lb)	Weight limit kg (lb)
Heavyweight	unlimited	unlimited
Middleweight	80 (176.4)	67 (147.7)
Lightweight	68 (149.9)	57 (125.7)
Flyweight	58 (127.9)	49 (108.0)

== See also ==
- Brazilian Jiu-Jitsu weight classes
- Boxing Weight Class
- Kickboxing weight classes
- Mixed martial arts weight classes
- Professional wrestling weight classes
- Wrestling weight classes
