= Juana Wangsa Putri =

Indonesian taekwondo practitioner

Personal information
- Full name: Juana Wangsa Putri
- Born: 13 February 1977 (age 49) Jakarta, Indonesia
- Height: 1.64 m (5 ft 4 1/2 in)
- Weight: 49 kg (108 lb)

Sport
- Sport: Taekwondo
- Event: 49 kg
Medal record
Women's taekwondo
Representing Indonesia
Asian Games
Bronze medal – third place	1998 Bangkok	51 kg
Bronze medal – third place	2002 Busan	51 kg
Asian Championships
Silver medal – second place	2002 Amman	51 kg
Bronze medal – third place	1998 Ho Chi Minh	47 kg

Juana Wangsa Putri (born 13 February 1977) is an Indonesian taekwondo practitioner, who competed in the women's flyweight category. She claimed a silver medal in the 51 kg category at the 2002 Asian Taekwondo Championships in Amman, Jordan, earned bronze medals at two consecutive Asian Games (1998 and 2002), and represented Indonesia in two editions of the Olympic Games (2000 and 2004).

Putri became the first Indonesian taekwondo athlete to officially debut at the 2000 Summer Olympics in Sydney, where she competed in the women's flyweight class (49 kg). She moved directly into the quarterfinals with a first round bye, but fell in a 2–7 defeat to Denmark's Hanne Høgh Poulsen.

When South Korea hosted the 2002 Asian Games held in Busan, Putri secured Indonesia's only bronze medal in the sport, after she was beaten by Thailand's Yaowapa Boorapolchai in the semifinal of the women's 51 kg division. She added this accolade to her previous bronze at the 1998 Asian Games and a silver from the Asian Championships a few months earlier.

At the 2004 Summer Olympics in Athens, Putri qualified for her second Indonesian appearance in the women's flyweight class (49 kg). Earlier in the process, she edged out Venezuela's Dalia Contreras in the final to earn a gold medal and secure a place on the Indonesian team at the World Olympic Qualifying Tournament in Paris, France. Putri failed to improve her Olympic feat from Sydney, after being defeated by Colombia's Gladys Mora on a referee decision in her opening match that ended in a 2–2 draw. With her Colombian opponent losing the quarterfinals to Taiwan (competing under the Chinese Taipei banner)'s eventual gold medalist Chen Shih-hsin, Putri was unable to proceed into the repechage bracket for an Olympic bronze medal.
