= Michalis Mouroutsos =

Greek taekwondo practitioner

Medal record

Men's taekwondo

Representing Greece

Olympic Games
Gold medal – first place	2000 Sydney	58 kg

European Championships
Bronze medal – third place	1997 Patras	56 kg
Gold medal – first place	2000 Patras	58 kg

Michalis (Michael) Mouroutsos (Greek: Μιχάλης Μουρούτσος, born 29 February 1980 in Langadia, Arcadia, Greece) is an Olympic taekwondo gold medalist from Greece. He became the inaugural Olympic champion in the men's -58 kg division at the 2000 Summer Olympics in Sydney.
