= Lineo Mochesane =

Lesotho taekwondo practitioner

Medal record

Women's taekwondo

Representing Lesotho

All-Africa Games
Bronze medal – third place	2011 Maputo	Finweight

Lineo Mochesane (born 29 July 1984) is a female Lesotho taekwondo athlete.

She won her first international gold medal in the women's finweight division (-47 kg) at the 2003 All-African championships.

Mochesan was the flag bearer for Lesotho during the Opening Ceremony of the 2004 Summer Olympics. She competed in the women's 49 kg class in the taekwondo tournament at the Olympics but lost in the first round to Austria's Nevena Lukic.

After the Olympics, Mochesan had limited success. In 2006, she won silver in women's finweight at the World Military Taekwondo Championships in Seoul, South Korea.

Olympic Games
Preceded by Mokete Mokhosi	Flagbearer for Lesotho; 2004 Athens	Succeeded by Simon Maine
