= Euda Carías =

Guatemalan taekwondo practitioner

Personal information
- Born: 7 May 1984 (age 42)

Sport
- Sport: Taekwondo
Medal record
Representing Guatemala
World Championships
Bronze medal – third place	2009 Copenhagen	Bantamweight
Pan American Games
Bronze medal – third place	2003 Santo Domingo	49 kg

Euda María Carías Morales (born May 7, 1984) is a female Guatemalan taekwondo athlete.

She won the bronze medal in the women's bantamweight (-53 kg) division at the 2009 World Taekwondo Championships, which was Guatemala's first World Championship medal in taekwondo since 1995 when Heidy Juárez won bronze in women's middleweight.
