= Ivett Gonda =

Canadian taekwondo practitioner

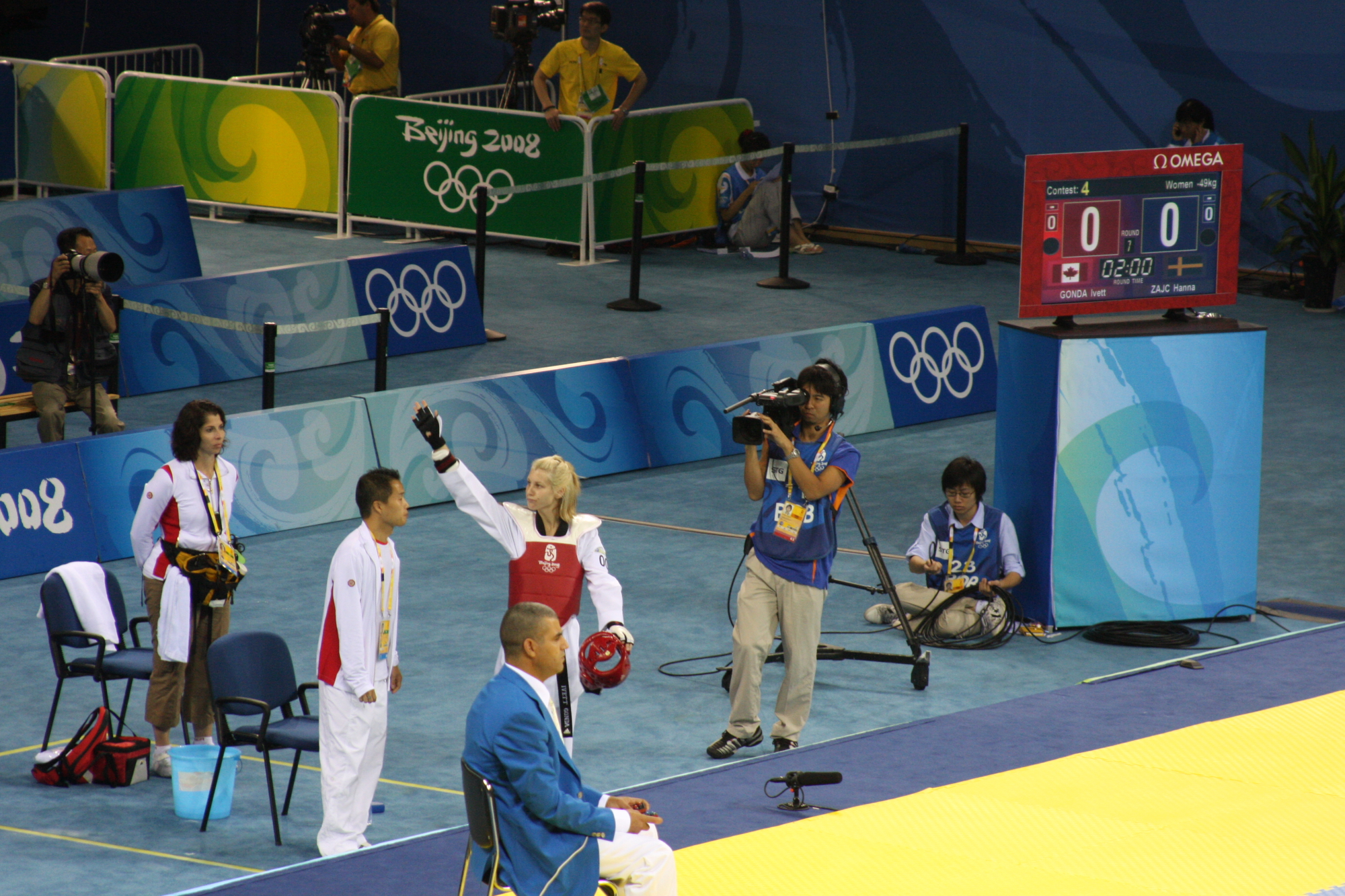
- Ivett Gonda at the 2008 Summer Olympics

Personal information
- Born: April 28, 1986 (age 40) Jászberény, Hungary

Sport
- Country: Canada (1995-2013); Hungary (2013-2016)
- Sport: Taekwondo
- Event: Bantamweight (53 kg)
Medal record
Women's taekwondo
Representing Canada
Pan American Games
Gold medal – first place	2011 Guadalajara	49 kg
Bronze medal – third place	2007 Rio de Janeiro	49 kg
Universiade
Bronze medal – third place	2011 Shenzhen	Bantamweight
Representing Hungary
Bronze medal – third place	2014 European Taekwondo Championships	49 kg

Ivett Gonda (born April 28, 1986, in Jászberény, Hungary) is a Hungarian-born Canadian retired taekwondo competitor. She moved to Canada when she was four. From 1995 to mid 2013 Gonda competed professionally for Canada until she decided to compete for her native country, Hungary. Though currently competing for another nation, Ivett still continues to train and live in Canada.

== Career ==
She began taekwondo in 1995. She was the second Canadian ever to make the Olympic team in 2004. She finished in fifth place at the 2003 World Championships in Garmisch-Partenkirchen, Germany in the Finweight-47 kg event.

=== 2008 Summer Olympics ===
Gonda is part of the three member Canadian Olympic team at the Summer Olympic Games in Taekwondo along with Karine Sergerie & Sébastien Michaud.

On August 20, 2008, Gonda faced Hanna Zajc of Sweden in her first bout at the Beijing olympics and lost 2–0 in a controversial upset. The outcome of the match stirred immediate controversy as Gonda had landed numerous strikes which were arguably scoring blows including a clear head-shot that knocked down Zajc and would have given Gonda 2 points had it been accepted by the judges. Gonda's coach, Shin Wook Lim protested during and after the match, but was ignored by judges who refused interviews and comments through intermediaries. Lim has suggested that Lei Zhao, a Chinese judge, one of four judges scoring the match, and head of the Chinese Taekwondo federation intentionally ignored Gonda's scoring to see the 33rd ranked Zajc advance to face a Chinese competitor in the next round instead of Gonda, widely reported as a medal contender prior to the bout and ranked 3rd in the world. Olympic taekwondo uses electronic clickers to tally points. Three of four judges must click in a point within a short interval for points to be tallied. Thus any conspiracy of two is sufficient to nullify any points scored. In conclusion, she still lost.

=== Continued career ===
Gonda was a participant at the 2011 Pan American Games where she won a gold medal in the competition and so did Olivier Pineau (heayweight division) and Melanie Phan(fly weight division).

=== Career highlights ===
- 2007 Pan American Games: Bronze
- 2007 World Championship: 9th
- 2006 Canadian Senior National Championships: Gold
- 2006 Senior Pan American Championship: Bronze
- 2005 Canadian Senior National Championships: Gold
- 2005 World Championship: 5th
- 2004 Canadian Senior National Championships: Gold
- 2004 Pan-American Championships: Gold
- 2004 Olympic Games: 5th
- 2003 Canadian Senior National Championships: Gold
- 2003 World Taekwondo Championships: 5th

=== Awards ===
- Named Most Valuable Player at the 2002 Junior National Championships and the 2006 Senior National Championships
