= Yaowapa Boorapolchai =

Thai taekwondo athlete (born 1984)

Yaowapa Boorapolchai TBh
Personal information
- Native name: เยาวภา บุรพลชัย
- Nationality: Thailand
- Born: September 6, 1984 (age 42) Bangkok, Thailand
- Height: 1.66 m (5 ft 5 1/2 in)

Sport
- Country: Thailand
- Sport: Taekwondo
- Event: Flyweight (-49 kg)
- Coached by: Choi Young-Seok
Medal record
Women's taekwondo
Representing Thailand
Olympic Games
Bronze medal – third place	2004 Athens	-49 kg
World Championships
Silver medal – second place	2007 Beijing	47kg
Bronze medal – third place	2003 Garmisch	51kg
World Cup
Gold medal – first place	2006 Bangkok	47kg
Asian Games
Silver medal – second place	2002 Busan	51kg
Bronze medal – third place	2006 Doha	47kg
Asian Championships
Gold medal – first place	2006 Bangkok	47kg
Universiade
Silver medal – second place	2005 Izmir	51kg
Silver medal – second place	2007 Bangkok	51kg
Bronze medal – third place	2003 Daegu	51kg
Southeast Asian Games
Gold medal – first place	2003 Hanoi - Ho Chi Minh City	51kg

Yaowapa Boorapolchai (Thai: เยาวภา บุรพลชัย; RTGS: Yaowapha Buraphonchai; born September 6, 1984, at Bangkok) is a Thai taekwondo athlete who was the bronze medalist in the women's under 49 kg event at the 2004 Summer Olympics. She graduated Bachelor of Arts historical major from Thammasat University.

She started competing in 2002. In the first round of the Women's Under 49 kg event she defeated Brigitte Yague of Spain, and in the quarterfinal was defeated by Yanelis Yuliet Labrada Diaz of Cuba. She defeated Ivett Gonda of Canada and Gladys Alicia Mora Romero of Colombia in the repechage tournament to win the bronze and become the first Thai Olympic medalist outside of boxing and weightlifting.

She won a bronze medal in the Universiade, World Taekwondo Championships, and World Taekwondo Olympic Qualification Tournament in 2003, and a gold in the South East Asian Games in the same year. Many Thais claim that Yaowapa, one of the most popular athletes among Thais, has frequently been victimized by wayward officiating. Besides her loss to Diaz in Athens, she also lost to Lim Su-Jeong, a Korean exponent, in a gold-medal match at the 2002 Asian Games in Busan, South Korea, and was defeated in the first round at the 2005 South East Asian Games in the Philippines by Loraine Lorelie Catalan, a Filipino exponent. Thai officials have claimed she was cheated by the judges in these matches, especially the matches involving exponents from the host nation. In 2011 Yaowa entered politics by applying to be a member of the Chart Pattana Puea Pandin Party and to be a candidate for the House of Representatives in the 2011 election in the Bangkok area. but was not elected Yaowapa ran for a member of the House of Representatives in the 2019 election in Bangkok, District 28 in the name of the Chart Pattana Party. Now she is party's spokesperson.

== See also ==
- List of Olympic medalists in taekwondo
