= Chen Shih-hsin =

Taiwanese taekwondo practitioner

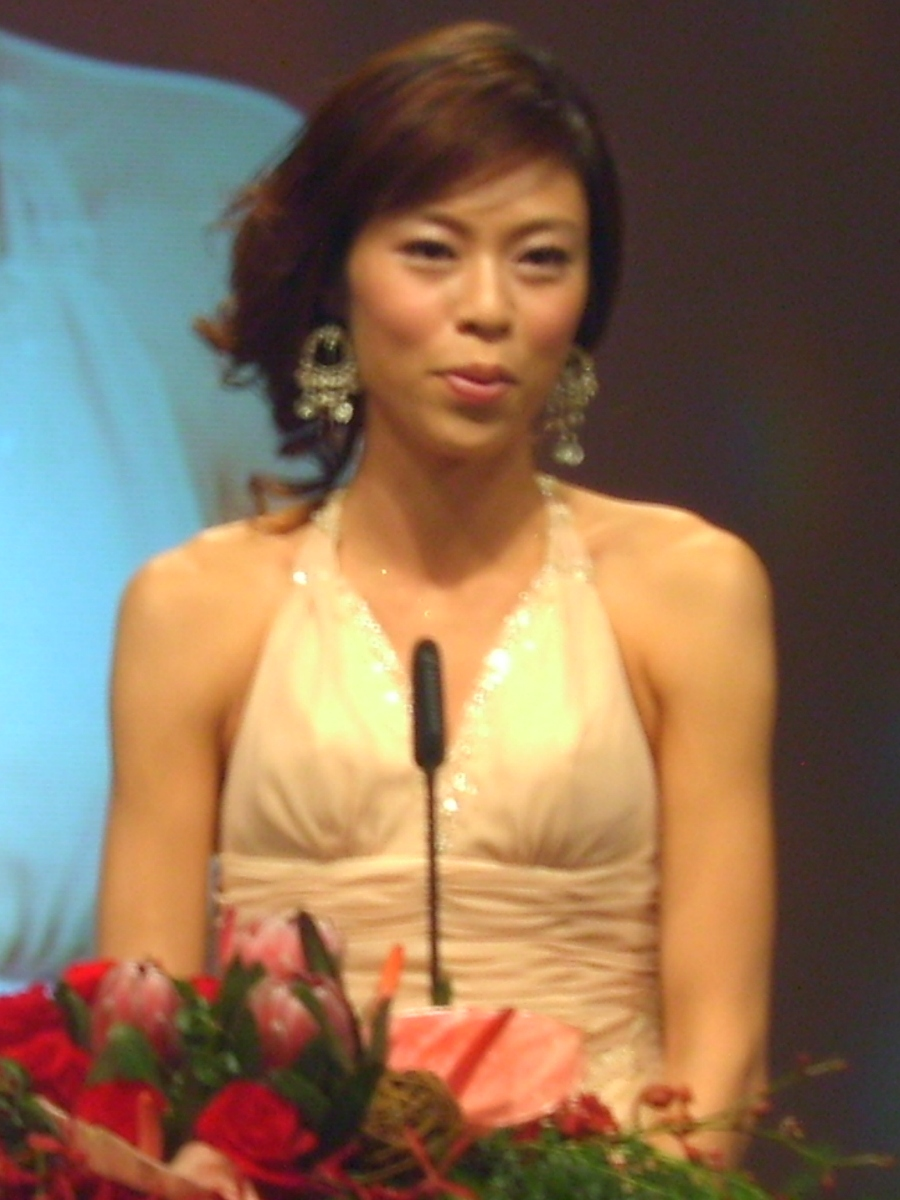
- Chen in 2006

Personal information
- Born: 16 November 1978 (age 47) Taipei, Taiwan
Medal record
Women's taekwondo
Representing Chinese Taipei
Olympic Games
Gold medal – first place	2004 Athens	49 kg
Asian Games
Gold medal – first place	2002 Busan	Finweight
East Asian Games
Gold medal – first place	2001 Osaka	Finweight
World Taekwondo Championships
Gold medal – first place	1994 George Town	Finweight
Gold medal – first place	1996 Rio de Janeiro	Finweight
Gold medal – first place	2001 Ho Chi Minh City	Finweight

Chen Shih-hsin (Chinese: 陳詩欣; pinyin: Chén Shīxīn; born 16 November 1978) is the first Taiwanese athlete to win a gold medal at the Olympics. She won the gold medal in the women's 49-kilogram category in taekwondo at the 2004 Summer Olympics on August 26.

Chen was recognized as one of the Taiwanese Ten Outstanding Young Persons in 2001. Currently, she is an associate professor at University of Taipei.

Chen is of Taiwanese Aboriginal descent, with her mother being a member of the Atayal tribe.

== See also ==
- List of Olympic medalists in taekwondo
