= South Korea at the 2004 Summer Olympics =

- IOC code: KOR
- NOC: Korean Olympic Committee
- Website: www.sports.or.kr (in Korean and English)

in Athens
- Competitors: 264 in 25 sports
- Flag bearer: Ku Min-jung
- Medals Ranked 9th: Gold 9 Silver 12 Bronze 9 Total 30

Summer Olympics appearances (overview)
- 1948; 1952; 1956; 1960; 1964; 1968; 1972; 1976; 1980; 1984; 1988; 1992; 1996; 2000; 2004; 2008; 2012; 2016; 2020; 2024; 2028

South Korea competed at the 2004 Summer Olympics in Athens, from 13 to 29 August 2004. This was the nation's fourteenth appearance at the Olympics, attending every Summer Olympics held during the country's existence up to that point with the exception of the 1980 Summer Olympics in Moscow because of its support for the United States-led boycott. The Korean Olympic Committee sent the nation's smallest delegation to the Games since 1992. A total of 264 athletes, 145 men and 119 women, competed in 25 sports.

South Korea left Athens with a total of 30 medals (9 golds, 12 silver, and 9 bronze), finishing ninth in the overall medal standings. Four of these medals were awarded to the athletes in archery, badminton, and taekwondo (South Korea's traditional martial art), and three each in judo, shooting, and table tennis. South Korea's team-based athletes proved successful in Athens as the women's handball team climbed the podium with a silver medal for the second time, following its major setback in Sydney from a fourth-place finish.

Among the nation's medalists were taekwondo jin Moon Dae-sung in the men's super heavyweight division, archer Park Sung-hyun in both women's individual and team event, artistic gymnasts Kim Dae-eun and Yang Tae-young in the men's individual all-around, and trap shooter Lee Bo-Na.

Both North Korea and South Korea marched together in the parade of nations during the opening and closing ceremonies under the Unification Flag, a white flag showing the united Korean Peninsula in blue. They had two flagbearers carrying the flag together at each occasion, one representing the North and the other representing the South. The female athletes and staff wore red blazers, while their male counterparts wore blue. Although they marched together, the teams competed separately and had separate medal tallies.

== Medalists ==
| Medal | Name | Sport | Event | Date |
|---|---|---|---|---|
| Gold | Lee Won-hee | Judo | Men's 73 kg | August 16 |
| Gold | Park Sung-hyun | Archery | Women's individual | August 18 |
| Gold | Lee Sung-jin; Park Sung-hyun; Yun Mi-jin | Archery | Women's team | August 20 |
| Gold | Ha Tae-kwon; Kim Dong-moon | Badminton | Men's doubles | August 20 |
| Gold | Im Dong-hyun; Jang Yong-ho; Park Kyung-mo | Archery | Men's team | August 21 |
| Gold | Ryu Seung-min | Table tennis | Men's singles | August 23 |
| Gold | Jang Ji-won | Taekwondo | Women's 57 kg | August 26 |
| Gold | Jung Ji-hyun | Wrestling | Men's Greco-Roman 60 kg | August 26 |
| Gold | Moon Dae-sung | Taekwondo | Men's +80 kg | August 28 |
| Silver | Jin Jong-oh | Shooting | Men's 50 m pistol | August 17 |
| Silver | Lee Sung-jin | Archery | Women's individual | August 18 |
| Silver | Kim Dae-eun | Gymnastics | Men's individual all-around | August 18 |
| Silver | Lee Bo-na | Shooting | Women's double trap | August 18 |
| Silver | Lee Bae-young | Weightlifting | Men's 69 kg | August 18 |
| Silver | Jang Sung-ho | Judo | Men's 100 kg | August 19 |
| Silver | Lee Dong-soo; Yoo Yong-sung | Badminton | Men's doubles | August 20 |
| Silver | Lee Eun-sil; Seok Eun-mi | Table tennis | Women's doubles | August 20 |
| Silver | Shon Seung-mo | Badminton | Men's singles | August 21 |
| Silver | Jang Mi-ran | Weightlifting | Women's +75 kg | August 21 |
| Silver | Moon Eui-jae | Wrestling | Men's freestyle 84 kg | August 28 |
| Silver | South Korea women's national handball team: Choi Im-jeong; Huh Soon-young; Huh Young-sook; Jang So-hee; Kim Cha-youn; Kim Hyun-ok; Lee Gong-joo; Lee Sang-eun; Lim O-kyeong; Moon Kyeong-ha; Moon Pil-hee; Myoung Bok-hee; Oh Seong-ok; Oh Yong-ran; Woo Sun-hee | Handball | Women's tournament | August 29 |
| Bronze | Choi Min-ho | Judo | Men's 60 kg | August 14 |
| Bronze | Lee Bo-na | Shooting | Women's trap | August 16 |
| Bronze | Yang Tae-young | Gymnastics | Men's individual all-around | August 18 |
| Bronze | Lee Kyung-won; Ra Kyung-min | Badminton | Women's doubles | August 20 |
| Bronze | Kim Kyung-ah | Table tennis | Women's singles | August 22 |
| Bronze | Song Myeong-seob | Taekwondo | Men's 68 kg | August 26 |
| Bronze | Hwang Kyung-seon | Taekwondo | Women's 67 kg | August 27 |
| Bronze | Jo Seok-hwan | Boxing | Featherweight | August 28 |
| Bronze | Kim Jung-joo | Boxing | Welterweight | August 29 |

Medals by sport
| Sport | 1st place, gold medalist(s) | 2nd place, silver medalist(s) | 3rd place, bronze medalist(s) | Total |
| Archery | 3 | 1 | 0 | 4 |
| Taekwondo | 2 | 0 | 2 | 4 |
| Badminton | 1 | 2 | 1 | 4 |
| Judo | 1 | 1 | 1 | 3 |
| Table tennis | 1 | 1 | 1 | 3 |
| Wrestling | 1 | 0 | 1 | 2 |
| Shooting | 0 | 2 | 1 | 3 |
| Weightlifting | 0 | 2 | 0 | 2 |
| Gymnastics | 0 | 1 | 1 | 2 |
| Handball | 0 | 1 | 0 | 1 |
| Boxing | 0 | 0 | 2 | 2 |
| Total | 9 | 12 | 9 | 30 |

== Archery ==
Three South Korean archers qualified each for the men's and women's individual archery, and a spot each for both men's and women's teams.

Men

| Athlete | Event | Ranking round | | Round of 64 | Round of 32 | Round of 16 | Quarterfinals | Semifinals | Final / BM | |
| Athlete | Event | Score | Seed | Opposition Score | Opposition Score | Opposition Score | Opposition Score | Opposition Score | Opposition Score | Rank |
|---|---|---|---|---|---|---|---|---|---|---|
| Im Dong-hyun | Individual | 687 WR | 1 | Bundhun (MRI); W 152–109 | Karageorgiou (GRE); W 171–159 | Prasad (IND); W 167–165 | Yamamoto (JPN); L 110–111 | Did not advance | | |
| Jang Yong-ho | Individual | 671 | 5 | Nanos (GRE); W 162–131 | Furukawa (JPN); W 166–163 | Cuddihy (AUS); L 112–113 | Did not advance | | | |
| Park Kyung-mo | Individual | 672 | 4 | Elder (FIJ); W 154–138 | Zabrodskiy (KAZ); W 164 (20)–164 (19) | Prylepau (BLR); W 173–166 | Cuddihy (AUS); L 111–112 | Did not advance | | |
| Im Dong-hyun; Jang Yong-ho; Park Kyung-mo | Team | 2030 | 1 | —N/a | | Bye | Netherlands; W 250–249 | Ukraine; W 242–239 | Chinese Taipei; W 251–245 | 1st place, gold medalist(s) |

Women

| Athlete | Event | Ranking round | | Round of 64 | Round of 32 | Round of 16 | Quarterfinals | Semifinals | Final / BM | |
| Athlete | Event | Score | Seed | Opposition Score | Opposition Score | Opposition Score | Opposition Score | Opposition Score | Opposition Score | Rank |
|---|---|---|---|---|---|---|---|---|---|---|
| Lee Sung-jin | Individual | 675 | 2 | Bahnasawy (EGY); W 164–127 | Romantzi (GRE); W 166–146 | Galinovskaya (RUS); W 165–154 | Wu H-J (TPE); W 104–103 | Yuan S-C (TPE); W 104–98 | Park S-H (KOR); L 108–110 | 2nd place, silver medalist(s) |
| Park Sung-hyun | Individual | 682 WR | 1 | Mansour (EGY); W 154–102 | Bolotova (RUS); W 165–148 | Folkard (GBR); W 171–159 | Psarra (GRE); W 111–101 | Williamson (GBR); W 110–100 | Lee S-J (KOR); W 110–108 | 1st place, gold medalist(s) |
| Yun Mi-jin | Individual | 673 | 3 | Karasiova (BLR); W 162–155 | Matsushita (JPN); W 173–149 | Nichols (USA); W 168–162 | Yuan S-C (TPE); L 105–107 | Did not advance | | |
| Lee Sung-jin; Park Sung-hyun; Yun Mi-jin | Team | 2030 WR | 1 | —N/a | | Bye | Greece; W 244–232 | France; W 249–234 | China; W 241–240 | 1st place, gold medalist(s) |

== Athletics ==
South Korean athletes have so far achieved qualifying standards in the following athletics events (up to a maximum of 3 athletes in each event at the 'A' Standard, and 1 at the 'B' Standard).

Key

- Note–Ranks given for track events are within the athlete's heat only
- Q = Qualified for the next round
- q = Qualified for the next round as a fastest loser or, in field events, by position without achieving the qualifying target
- NR = National record
- N/A = Round not applicable for the event
- Bye = Athlete not required to compete in round

Men
Track & road events

| Athlete | Event | Heat | | Quarterfinal | | Semifinal | | Final | |
| Athlete | Event | Result | Rank | Result | Rank | Result | Rank | Result | Rank |
|---|---|---|---|---|---|---|---|---|---|
| Ji Young-joon | Marathon | —N/a | | | | | | 2:16.14 | 17 |
| Kim Dong-young | 50 km walk | —N/a | | | | | | 4:05:16 | 27 |
| Lee Bong-ju | Marathon | —N/a | | | | | | 2:15.33 | 14 |
| Lee Dae-ro | 20 km walk | —N/a | | | | | | 1:28:59 | 33 |
| Lee Jae-hoon | 800 m | 1:46.24 | 3 | —N/a | | Did not advance | | | |
| Lee Myong-seung | Marathon | —N/a | | | | | | 2:21:01 | 41 |
| Park Chil-sung | 20 km walk | —N/a | | | | | | 1:32:41 | 41 |
| Park Tae-kyong | 110 m hurdles | 13.96 | 7 | Did not advance | | | | | |
| Shin Il-yong | 20 km walk | —N/a | | | | | | 1:28:02 | 29 |

Field events

| Athlete | Event | Qualification | | Final | |
| Athlete | Event | Distance | Position | Distance | Position |
|---|---|---|---|---|---|
| Kim Yoo-suk | Pole vault | 5.30 | =33 | Did not advance | |
| Park Hyung-jun | Triple jump | 15.84 | 39 | Did not advance | |
| Park Jae-myong | Javelin throw | 72.70 | 29 | Did not advance | |

Women
Track & road events

| Athlete | Event | Final | |
| Athlete | Event | Result | Rank |
|---|---|---|---|
| Choi Kyung-hee | Marathon | 2:44:05 | 35 |
| Chung Yun-hee | Marathon | 2:38:57 | 23 |
| Kim Mi-jung | 20 km walk | DSQ | |
| Lee Eun-jung | Marathon | 2:37:23 | 19 |

Field events

| Athlete | Event | Qualification | | Final | |
| Athlete | Event | Distance | Position | Distance | Position |
|---|---|---|---|---|---|
| Chang Jung-yeon | Javelin throw | 53.93 | 36 | Did not advance | |
| Lee Mi-young | Shot put | 16.35 | 28 | Did not advance | |

== Badminton ==
Men

| Athlete | Event | Round of 32 | Round of 16 | Quarterfinal | Semifinal | Final / BM | |
| Athlete | Event | Opposition Score | Opposition Score | Opposition Score | Opposition Score | Opposition Score | Rank |
|---|---|---|---|---|---|---|---|
| Lee Hyun-il | Singles | Brehaut (AUS); W 15–3, 15–2 | Ponsana (THA); L 13–15, 11–15 | Did not advance | | | |
| Park Tae-sang | Singles | Gupta (IND); W 15–12, 15–0 | Bao Cl (CHN); W 15–11, 15–12 | Kuncoro (INA); L 13–15, 4–15 | Did not advance | | |
| Shon Seung-mo | Singles | Viitikko (FIN); W 15–12, 15–3 | Vaughan (GBR); W 15–9, 15–4 | Chen H (CHN); W 10–15, 15–4, 15–10 | Kuncoro (INA); W 15–6, 9–15, 15–9 | Hidayat (INA); L 8–15, 7–15 | 2nd place, silver medalist(s) |
| Ha Tae-kwon; Kim Dong-moon | Doubles | Bye | Łogosz / Mateusiak (POL); W 15–9, 15–2 | Sang Y / Zheng B (CHN); W 15–7, 15–11 | Hian / Limpele (INA); W 15–8, 15–2 | Lee D-S / Yoo Y-S (KOR); W 15–11, 15–4 | 1st place, gold medalist(s) |
| Kim Yong-hyun; Yim Bang-eun | Doubles | Bye | Paaske / Rasmussen (DEN); W 7–15, 15–6, 15–12 | Hian / Limpele (INA); L 1–15, 10–15 | Did not advance | | |
| Lee Dong-soo; Yoo Yong-sung | Doubles | Crespo / Llopis (ESP); W 15–3, 15–9 | Hadiyanto / Yulianto (INA); W 15–11, 15–10 | Choong T F / Lee W W (MAS); W 11–15, 15–11, 15–9 | Eriksen / Hansen (DEN); W 9–15, 15–5, 15–3 | Ha T-K; Kim D-M (KOR); L 11–15, 4–15 | 2nd place, silver medalist(s) |

Women

| Athlete | Event | Round of 32 | Round of 16 | Quarterfinal | Semifinal | Final / BM | |
| Athlete | Event | Opposition Score | Opposition Score | Opposition Score | Opposition Score | Opposition Score | Rank |
|---|---|---|---|---|---|---|---|
| Jun Jae-youn | Singles | Reid (CAN); W 11–4, 11–5 | Cheng S-C (TPE); L 11–3, 6–11, 4–11 | Did not advance | | | |
| Seo Yoon-hee | Singles | Pi (FRA); W 11–6, 6–11, 11–7 | Nedelcheva (BUL); L 11–7, 5–11, 8–11 | Did not advance | | | |
| Hwang Yu-mi; Lee Hyo-jung | Doubles | Bye | Cheng W-H / Chien Y-C (TPE); W 15–13, 8–15, 15–5 | Wei Yl / Zhao Tt (CHN); L 15–13, 8–15, 15–5 | Did not advance | | |
| Lee Kyung-won; Ra Kyung-min | Doubles | Bye | Harder / Schjoldager (DEN); W 15–8, 15–8 | Audina / Bruil (NED); W 15–2, 15–2 | Yang W / Zhang Jw (CHN); L 6–15, 4–15 | Wei Yl / Zhao Tt (CHN); W 10–15, 15–9, 15–7 | 3rd place, bronze medalist(s) |

Mixed

| Athlete | Event | Round of 32 | Round of 16 | Quarterfinal | Semifinal | Final / BM | |
| Athlete | Event | Opposition Score | Opposition Score | Opposition Score | Opposition Score | Opposition Score | Rank |
|---|---|---|---|---|---|---|---|
| Kim Dong-moon; Ra Kyung-min | Doubles | Bye | C Bruil / L Bruil (NED); W 15–4, 15–6 | Olsen / Rasmussen (DEN); L 14–17, 8–15 | Did not advance | | |
| Kim Yong-hyun; Lee Hyo-jung | Doubles | Bye | Eriksen / Schjoldager (DEN); L 15–6, 12–15, 13–15 | Did not advance | | | |

== Basketball ==
=== Women's tournament ===
Roster

The following is the South Korea roster in the women's basketball tournament of the 2004 Summer Olympics.

South Korea women's national basketball team – 2004 Summer Olympics roster
Players
Coaches

| Pos. | No. | Name | Age – Date of birth | Height | Club | Ctr. |
|---|---|---|---|---|---|---|
| G | 4 | Kim Yeong-ok | 30 – 4 March 1974 | 1.68 m (5 ft 6 in) | KB Stars | (South Korea) |
| G | 5 | Lee Mi-sun | 25 – 19 February 1979 | 1.74 m (5 ft 9 in) | Samsung | (South Korea) |
| G | 6 | Kim Ji-hyun | 19 – 2 February 1985 | 1.78 m (5 ft 10 in) | Chuncheon Woori Bank Hansae | (South Korea) |
| C | 7 | Kang Ji-sook | 25 – 4 February 1979 | 1.98 m (6 ft 6 in) | Cheongju SK Knights | (South Korea) |
| F | 8 | Cho Hey-jin (C) | 30 – 25 September 1973 | 1.78 m (5 ft 10 in) | Chuncheon Woori Bank Hansae | (South Korea) |
| F/C | 9 | Hur Yoon-ja | 25 – 19 April 1979 | 1.83 m (6 ft 0 in) | Shinsegae Cool Cats | (South Korea) |
| F | 10 | Beon Yeon-ha | 24 – 7 March 1980 | 1.82 m (6 ft 0 in) | Samsung | (South Korea) |
| F | 11 | Park Jung-eun | 27 – 14 January 1977 | 1.80 m (5 ft 11 in) | Samsung | (South Korea) |
| F/C | 12 | Jung Mi-ran | 19 – 20 March 1985 | 1.83 m (6 ft 0 in) | Kumho Redwings | (South Korea) |
| C | 13 | Lee Jong-ae | 29 – 18 March 1975 | 1.87 m (6 ft 2 in) | Chuncheon Woori Bank Hansae | (South Korea) |
| C | 14 | Kim Kwe-ryong | 24 – 17 December 1979 | 1.91 m (6 ft 3 in) | Samsung | (South Korea) |
| C | 15 | Hong Hyun-hee | 22 – 24 January 1982 | 1.91 m (6 ft 3 in) | Chuncheon Woori Bank Hansae | (South Korea) |

Head coach

- (South Korea) Park Myung-soo

Assistant coach(es)

- (South Korea) Lee Young-ju

Legend

- (C) Team captain
- nat field describes country
  of last club
  before the tournament
- Age as of August 13, 2004

Group play

| Pos | Team | Pld | W | L | PF | PA | PD | Pts | Qualification |
|---|---|---|---|---|---|---|---|---|---|
| 1 | United States | 5 | 5 | 0 | 430 | 285 | +145 | 10 | Quarterfinals |
| 2 | Spain | 5 | 4 | 1 | 368 | 334 | +34 | 9 | Quarterfinals |
| 3 | Czech Republic | 5 | 3 | 2 | 408 | 375 | +33 | 8 | Quarterfinals |
| 4 | New Zealand | 5 | 2 | 3 | 321 | 414 | −93 | 7 | Quarterfinals |
| 5 | China | 5 | 1 | 4 | 360 | 406 | −46 | 6 | |
| 6 | South Korea | 5 | 0 | 5 | 320 | 393 | −73 | 5 | |

Source: FIBA archive
Rules for classification: 1) points; 2) head-to-head points; 3) head-to-head goal average; 4) head-to-head number of points scored.

14 August 2004
11:15

| South Korea | 54–71 | China |
Scoring by quarter: 15–18, 6–15, 21–24, 12–14
| Pts: Beon 19; Rebs: Kim Y. 4 Asts: Lee M 2 | | Pts: Chen N. Rebs: Ye 8 Asts: Miao 3 |

Helliniko Indoor Arena, Athens
Attendance: 600
Referees:
Chantal Julien (France)
Christos Christodoulou (Greece)

16 August 2004
9:00

| New Zealand | 81–73 | South Korea |
Scoring by quarter: 21–11, 16–15, 26–23, 18–24
| Pts: G. Farmer 22; Rebs: Loffhagen 14; Asts: Marino 4 | | Pts: Kim Y. 21; Rebs: Kim Y. 5 Asts: Beon 3 |

Helliniko Indoor Arena, Athens
Attendance: 180
Referees:
Alejandro Chiti (Argentina)
Tatiana Steigerwald (Brazil)

18 August 2004
14:30

| South Korea | 57–80 | United States |
Scoring by quarter: 23–20, 9–19, 7–29, 18–12
| Pts: Lee M 16; Rebs: Kim Y. 5 Asts: Kim Y., Lee M 3 | | Pts: Leslie 25; Rebs: Leslie, Thompson 7 Asts: Three players 3 |

Olympic Indoor Hall, Athens
Attendance: 2,000
Referees:
Michael Aylen (Australia)
Dallas Pickering (New Zealand)

20 August 2004
16:45

| Czech Republic | 97–75 | South Korea |
Scoring by quarter: 24–16, 21–19, 29–17, 23–23
| Pts: Machová 28; Rebs: Večeřová 8 Asts: Hamzová 5 | | Pts: Beon 26; Rebs: Beon 4 Asts: Kim Y. 3 |

Helliniko Indoor Arena, Athens
Attendance: 753
Referees:
Vladimir Okhrimenko (Russia)
Abreu Joao (Mozambique)

22 August 2004
22:15

| Spain | 64–61 | South Korea |
Scoring by quarter: 14–11, 15–16, 17–19, 18–15
| Pts: Valdemoro 11; Rebs: Pons 9 Asts: Palau 3 | | Pts: Beon 19; Rebs: Kim Y. 6 Asts: Lee M 6 |

Helliniko Indoor Arena, Athens
Attendance: 1,152
Referees:
Elizabeth Sisk (United States)
Song Yanping (China)

Classification match (11th–12th place)

24 August 2004
9:00

11th place

| Nigeria | 68–64 | South Korea |
Scoring by quarter: 16–16, 13–16, 21–12, 18–20
| Pts: Udoka 21; Rebs: Mohammed 13; Asts: Umoh 2 | | Pts: Kim Y. 19; Rebs: Lee M. 12; Asts: Lee M. 7 |

Helliniko Indoor Arena, Athens
Attendance: 155
Referees:
Philippe Leemann (Switzerland)
Chantal Julien (France)

== Boxing ==
South Korea sent seven boxers to Athens. They returned with two bronze medals, putting them in a four-way tie for 12th place in the boxing medal count. Three lost their round of 32 bouts, while the other four all won in the round of 16 to advance to the quarterfinals. Two more fell there, with the remaining two losing in the semifinals to finish with bronze medals. The combined record of the Korean team was 9-7.

| Athlete | Event | Round of 32 | Round of 16 | Quarterfinals | Semifinals | Final | |
| Athlete | Event | Opposition Result | Opposition Result | Opposition Result | Opposition Result | Opposition Result | Rank |
|---|---|---|---|---|---|---|---|
| Hong Moo-won | Light flyweight | Rabenarivo (MAD); W RSC | Tanamor (PHI); W 45–25 | Bartelemí (CUB); L 11–30 | Did not advance | | |
| Kim Ki-suk | Flyweight | Jongjohor (THA); L 12–22 | Did not advance | | | | |
| Kim Won-il | Bantamweight | Petchkoom (THA); L RSC | Did not advance | | | | |
| Jo Seok-hwan | Featherweight | Taşcı (TUR); W 37–28 | Gaudet (CAN); W 28–16 | Simion (ROM); W 39–35 | Tishchenko (RUS); L 25–45 | Did not advance | 3rd place, bronze medalist(s) |
| Baik Jong-sub | Lightweight | Káté (HUN); W 30–23 | Mönkh-Erdene (MGL); W 33–22 | Khan (GBR); L RSC | Did not advance | | |
| Kim Jung-joo | Welterweight | Bye | Gruşac (MDA); W 23–20 | Novoa (COL); W 25–23 | Aragón (CUB); L 10–38 | Did not advance | 3rd place, bronze medalist(s) |
| Song Hak-sung | Light heavyweight | Kensi (ALG); L 19–25 | Did not advance | | | | |

== Cycling ==
=== Road ===
| Athlete | Event | Time | Rank |
|---|---|---|---|
| Han Song-hee | Women's road race | 3:40:43 | 51 |

=== Track ===
Sprint

| Athlete | Event | Qualification | | Round 1 | Repechage 1 | Round 2 | Repechage 2 | Quarterfinals | Semifinals | Final | |
| Athlete | Event | Time Speed (km/h) | Rank | Opposition Time Speed (km/h) | Opposition Time Speed (km/h) | Opposition Time Speed (km/h) | Opposition Time Speed (km/h) | Opposition Time Speed (km/h) | Opposition Time Speed (km/h) | Opposition Time Speed (km/h) | Rank |
|---|---|---|---|---|---|---|---|---|---|---|---|
| Kim Chi-bum | Men's sprint | 10.673; 67.459 | 15 | Gané (FRA); L | Mulder (NED); Kaňkovský (CZE); L | Did not advance | | | | | |
| Yang Hee-chun | Men's sprint | 10.955; 65.723 | 17 | Wolff (GER); L | Ng (MAS); Jeřábek (SVK); L | Did not advance | | | | | |

Keirin

| Athlete | Event | 1st round | Repechage | 2nd round | Final |
| Athlete | Event | Rank | Rank | Rank | Rank |
|---|---|---|---|---|---|
| Hong Suk-hwan | Men's keirin | 6 R | 3 | Did not advance | |
| Yang Hee-chun | Men's keirin | 7 R | 5 | Did not advance | |

Omnium

| Athlete | Event | Points | Laps | Rank |
|---|---|---|---|---|
| Kim Yong-mi | Women's points race | −19 | −2 | 16 |

== Equestrian ==
=== Show jumping ===
| Athlete | Horse | Event | Qualification | | | | | | | | Final | | | | | Total | |
| Athlete | Horse | Event | Round 1 | | Round 2 | | | Round 3 | | | Round A | | Round B | | | Total | |
| Athlete | Horse | Event | Penalties | Rank | Penalties | Total | Rank | Penalties | Total | Rank | Penalties | Rank | Penalties | Total | Rank | Penalties | Rank |
|---|---|---|---|---|---|---|---|---|---|---|---|---|---|---|---|---|---|
| Hwang Soon-won | C. Chap | Individual | 6 | =42 | 9 | 15 | 39 Q | 6 | 21 | =33 Q | 8 | =12 Q | 16 | 24 | 22 | 24 | 22 |
| Joo Jung-hyun | Epsom Gesmeray | Individual | 14 | =66 | 13 | 27 | =59 Q | 10 | 27 | =51 Q | 8 | =12 Q | Eliminated | | | 8 | =25 |
| Sohn Bong-gak | Cim Christo | Individual | 5 | =31 | 21 | 26 | =55 Q | 5 | 31 | =44 Q | 5 | 10 Q | 13 | 18 | 15 | 18 | 15 |
| Woo Jung-ho | Seven Up | Individual | 6 | =42 | 8 | 14 | =38 Q | 16 | 30 | 43 | Did not advance | | | | | | |
| Hwang Soon-won; Joo Jung-hyun; Sohn Bong-gak; Woo Jung-ho | See above | Team | —N/a | | | | | | | | 30 | 10 Q | 21 | 51 | 9 | 51 | 8 |

== Fencing ==
Twelve South Korean fencers (six men and six women) qualified for the following categories:

Men

| Athlete | Event | Round of 64 | Round of 32 | Round of 16 | Quarterfinal | Semifinal | Final / BM | |
| Athlete | Event | Opposition Score | Opposition Score | Opposition Score | Opposition Score | Opposition Score | Opposition Score | Rank |
|---|---|---|---|---|---|---|---|---|
| Lee Sang-yup | Individual épée | Bye | Khvorost (UKR); W 15–11 | Jeannet (FRA); L 5–15 | Did not advance | | | |
| Choi Byung-chul | Individual foil | Bye | Nasibulin (RUS); W 15–12 | Joppich (GER); L 10–15 | Did not advance | | | |
| Ha Chang-duk | Individual foil | Bye | Molchan (RUS); W 15–13 | Sanzo (ITA); L 6–15 | Did not advance | | | |
| Park Hee-kyung | Individual foil | Bye | Wessels (GER); W 15–13 | Cassara (ITA); L 13–15 | Did not advance | | | |
| Choi Byung-chul; Ha Chang-duk; Kim Woon-sung; Park Hee-kyung | Team foil | —N/a | | | China; L 36–45 | Classification semi-final Germany; L 40–45 | 7th place final Egypt; W 45–35 | 7 |
| Oh Eun-seok | Individual sabre | Bye | Pillet (FRA); L 13–15 | Did not advance | | | | |

Women

| Athlete | Event | Round of 64 | Round of 32 | Round of 16 | Quarterfinal | Semifinal | Final / BM | |
| Athlete | Event | Opposition Score | Opposition Score | Opposition Score | Opposition Score | Opposition Score | Opposition Score | Rank |
|---|---|---|---|---|---|---|---|---|
| Kim Hee-jeong | Individual épée | Bye | Ermakova (RUS); W 9–7 | Li N (CHN); W 14–9 | Mincza-Nébald (HUN); L 9–15 | Did not advance | | |
| Kim Mi-jung | Individual épée | Bye | Duplitzer (GER); L 9–15 | Did not advance | | | | |
| Lee Keum-nam | Individual épée | Bye | Halls (AUS); L 14–15 | Did not advance | | | | |
| Go Jung-nam; Kim Hee-jeong; Kim Mi-jung; Lee Keum-nam | Team épée | —N/a | | | Russia; L 31–37 | Classification semi-final Hungary; L 33–40 | 7th place final Greece; W 44–30 | 7 |
| Nam Hyun-hee | Individual foil | —N/a | de Castro (BRA); W 15–6 | Scarlat (ROM); W 15–7 | Mohamed (HUN); L 5–15 | Did not advance | | |
| Lee Shin-mi | Individual sabre | —N/a | Faez (CUB); L 13–15 | Did not advance | | | | |

== Field hockey ==
=== Men's tournament ===
Roster

The following is the South Korean roster in the men's field hockey tournament of the 2004 Summer Olympics.

Head coach: Kim Young-kyu

1. Ko Dong-sik
2. Ji Seung-hwan
5. Kim Yong-bae
6. Kang Seong-jung
7. Yeo Woon-kon
8. Kim Jung-chul
9. Song Seung-tae
10. Lim Jung-woo
11. Lee Jeong-seon
15. Han Hyung-bae
16. Kim Jong-min
19. You Hyo-sik
22. Jeon Jong-ha
23. Kim Kyung-seok
25. Jang Jong-hyun
32. Seo Jong-ho

Group play

| Pos | Team | Pld | W | D | L | GF | GA | GD | Pts | Qualification |
|---|---|---|---|---|---|---|---|---|---|---|
| 1 | Spain | 5 | 3 | 2 | 0 | 14 | 3 | +11 | 11 | Semi-finals |
| 2 | Germany | 5 | 3 | 2 | 0 | 15 | 6 | +9 | 11 | Semi-finals |
| 3 | Pakistan | 5 | 3 | 0 | 2 | 19 | 8 | +11 | 9 | 5–8th place semi-finals |
| 4 | South Korea | 5 | 2 | 2 | 1 | 17 | 8 | +9 | 8 | 5–8th place semi-finals |
| 5 | Great Britain | 5 | 1 | 0 | 4 | 9 | 21 | −12 | 3 | 9–12th place semi-finals |
| 6 | Egypt | 5 | 0 | 0 | 5 | 2 | 30 | −28 | 0 | 9–12th place semi-finals |

Source: FIH

15 August 2004
18:00

| South Korea | 1 – 1 | Spain |
|---|---|---|
| You Hyo-Sik 16' | Report | Freixa 43' |

Umpires:
Sumesh Putra (CAN)
Peter Elders (NED)

17 August 2004
08:30

| South Korea | 3 – 2 | Great Britain |
|---|---|---|
| Lee Jung-Seon 15', 68'; Yeo Woon-Kon 47' | Report | Hall 45'; Stott 52' |

Umpires:
Pedro Teixeira (POR)
John Wright (RSA)

19 August 2004
10:30

| Pakistan | 3 – 0 | South Korea |
|---|---|---|
| Butt 43'; Abbasi 56'; Abbas 66' | Report |

Umpires:
Ray O'Connor (IRL)
Amarjit Singh (MAS)

21 August 2004
08:30

| Egypt | 0 – 11 | South Korea |
|---|---|---|
| | Report | Lee Jung-Seon 16', 25', 37', 59', 68'; Jeon Jong-Ha 29'; Seo Jong-Ho 57'; Song Seung-Tae 62', 65', 65'; You Hyo-Sik 66' |

Umpires:
Padro Teixeira (POR)
Christian Blasch (GER)

23 August 2004
18:30

| South Korea | 2 – 2 | Germany |
|---|---|---|
| Lee Jung-Seon 8', 54' | Report | Zeller 35'; Emmerling 66' |

Umpires:
Henrik Ehlers (DEN)
John Wright (RSA)

5th–8th place match

25 August 2004
18:00

| New Zealand | 4 – 3 | South Korea |
|---|---|---|
| Burrows 26', 62', 69'; McIndoe 28' | Report | Yeo Woon-Kon 14'; Lee Jung-Seon 39'; Jeon Jong-Ha 57' |

Umpires:
Peter Elders (NED)
Xavier Adell (ESP)

7th place match

27 August 2004
08:30

| South Korea | 2 – 5 | India |
|---|---|---|
| Ji Seong-Hwan 57'; Kang Seong-Jung 58' | Report | G. A. Singh 4', 11'; V. Pillay 15'; P. Singh 32'; Sinclair 68' |

Umpires:
Jason McCracken (NZL)
Peter Elders (NED)

=== Women's tournament ===
Roster

The following is the South Korean roster in the women's field hockey tournament of the 2004 Summer Olympics.

Head coach: Kim Sang-ryul

1. Park Yong-sook (GK)
2. Kim Yun-mi
3. Lee Jin-hui
4. Yoo Hee-joo
6. Kim Jeong-a
7. Lee Seon-ok
8. Lee Mi-seong
9. Park Eun-kyung
10. Oh Ko-woon
11. Kim Seong-eun
12. Go Gwang-min
13. Park Mi-hyun
15. Kim Jin-gyeong
16. Lim Ju-young (GK)
17. Kim Mi-seon
18. Park Jeong-suk

Group play

| Pos | Team | Pld | W | D | L | GF | GA | GD | Pts | Qualification |
|---|---|---|---|---|---|---|---|---|---|---|
| 1 | Netherlands | 4 | 4 | 0 | 0 | 14 | 5 | +9 | 12 | Semi-finals |
| 2 | Germany | 4 | 2 | 0 | 2 | 6 | 10 | −4 | 6 | Semi-finals |
| 3 | South Korea | 4 | 1 | 1 | 2 | 9 | 8 | +1 | 4 | |
| 4 | Australia | 4 | 1 | 1 | 2 | 6 | 5 | +1 | 4 | |
| 5 | South Africa | 4 | 1 | 0 | 3 | 5 | 12 | −7 | 3 | |

Source: FIH
Rules for classification: 1) Points; 2) Matches won; 3) Goal difference; 4) Goals for; 5) Head-to-head result.

16 August 2004
20:00

| South Korea | 2 – 3 | Netherlands |
|---|---|---|
| Kim Jin-Kyoung 19'; Park Jeong-Sook 57' | Report | Van der Vaart 26', 35'; Booij 40' |

Umpires:
Caroline de la Fuente (ARG)
Julie Ashton-Lucy (AUS)

18 August 2004
18:00

| South Africa | 0 – 3 | South Korea |
|---|---|---|
| | Report | Ko Kwang-Min 17'; Lee Seon-Ok 35'; Kim Yun-Mi 46' |

Umpires:
Jean Duncan (GBR)
Renee Cohen (NED)

20 August 2004
08:30

| South Korea | 2 – 2 | Australia |
|---|---|---|
| Park Mi-Hyun 31'; Kim Seong-Eun 46' | Report | Dobson 6'; Powell 43' |

Umpires:
Soledad Iparraguirre (ARG)
Marelize de Klerk (RSA)

22 August 2004
08:30

| Germany | 3 – 2 | South Korea |
|---|---|---|
| Kühn 11'; Gude 30'; Casaretto 59' | Report | Park Mi-Hyun 32'; Kim Seong-Eun 70' |

Umpires:
Carolina de la Fuente (ARG)
Soledad Iparraguirre (ARG)

5th–8th place match

24 August 2004
08:30

| South Korea | 2 – 3 (a.e.t.) | New Zealand |
|---|---|---|
| Kim Yun-Mi 44'; Park Mi-Hyun 46' | Report | Roberts-Lang 4'; Muirhead 8'; Walton 80' |

Umpires:
Ute Conen (GER)
Jean Duncan (GBR)

7th place match

27 August 2004
08:30

| South Korea | 3 – 1 | Japan |
|---|---|---|
| Oh Ko-Woon 12', 18'; Kim Jin-Kyoung 19' | Report | Miura 35+' |

Umpires:
Carolina de la Fuente (ARG)
Julie Ashton-Lucy (AUS)

== Football ==
=== Men's tournament ===
Roster

The following is the South Korean squad in the men's football tournament of the 2004 Summer Olympics.

Head coach: Kim Ho-kon

| No. | Pos. | Player | Date of birth (age) | Caps | Goals | 2004 club |
|---|---|---|---|---|---|---|
| 1 | GK | Kim Young-kwang | 28 June 1983 (aged 21) | 18 | 0 | (Korea Football Association) Jeonnam Dragons |
| 2 | DF | Choi Won-kwon | 8 November 1981 (aged 22) | 22 | 0 | (Korea Football Association) FC Seoul |
| 3 | DF | Kim Chi-gon | 29 July 1983 (aged 21) | 11 | 0 | (Korea Football Association) FC Seoul |
| 4 | DF | Park Yong-ho | 25 March 1981 (aged 23) | 19 | 1 | (Korea Football Association) FC Seoul |
| 5 | DF | Cho Byung-kuk | 1 July 1981 (aged 23) | 22 | 0 | (Korea Football Association) Suwon Samsung Bluewings |
| 6 | MF | Yoo Sang-chul* | 18 October 1971 (aged 32) | 0 | 0 | (Japan Football Association) Yokohama F. Marinos |
| 7 | MF | Kim Do-heon | 14 July 1982 (aged 22) | 23 | 2 | (Korea Football Association) Suwon Samsung Bluewings |
| 8 | FW | Chung Kyung-ho* | 22 May 1980 (aged 24) | 0 | 0 | (Korea Football Association) Ulsan Hyundai Horangi |
| 9 | FW | Lee Chun-soo | 9 July 1981 (aged 23) | 3 | 1 | (Royal Spanish Football Federation) Real Sociedad |
| 10 | FW | Choi Sung-kuk | 8 February 1983 (aged 21) | 21 | 2 | (Korea Football Association) Ulsan Hyundai Horangi |
| 11 | FW | Choi Tae-uk | 13 March 1981 (aged 23) | 22 | 10 | (Korea Football Association) Incheon United |
| 12 | MF | Park Kyu-seon | 24 September 1981 (aged 22) | 18 | 0 | (Korea Football Association) Jeonbuk Hyundai Motors |
| 13 | MF | Kim Dong-jin | 29 January 1982 (aged 22) | 23 | 3 | (Korea Football Association) FC Seoul |
| 14 | MF | Kim Jung-woo | 9 May 1982 (aged 22) | 20 | 1 | (Korea Football Association) Ulsan Hyundai Horangi |
| 15 | DF | Lee Jung-youl | 16 August 1981 (aged 22) | 5 | 0 | (Korea Football Association) FC Seoul |
| 16 | FW | Namkung Do | 4 June 1982 (aged 22) | 9 | 0 | (Korea Football Association) Jeonbuk Hyundai Motors |
| 17 | FW | Cho Jae-jin | 9 July 1981 (aged 23) | 22 | 7 | (Japan Football Association) Shimizu S-Pulse |
| 18 | GK | Kim Jee-hyuk | 26 October 1981 (aged 22) | 3 | 0 | (Korea Football Association) Busan I'Cons |

* Over-aged player.

Group play

| Pos | Team | Pld | W | D | L | GF | GA | GD | Pts | Qualification |
|---|---|---|---|---|---|---|---|---|---|---|
| 1 | Mali | 3 | 1 | 2 | 0 | 5 | 3 | +2 | 5 | Qualified for the quarterfinals |
| 2 | South Korea | 3 | 1 | 2 | 0 | 6 | 5 | +1 | 5 | Qualified for the quarterfinals |
| 3 | Mexico | 3 | 1 | 1 | 1 | 3 | 3 | 0 | 4 | |
| 4 | Greece | 3 | 0 | 1 | 2 | 4 | 7 | −3 | 1 | |

11 August 2004
20:30

| South Korea | 2 – 2 | Greece |
|---|---|---|
| Kim D.J. 43'; Vyntra 64' (o.g.) | Report | Taralidis 78'; Papadopoulos 82' (pen.) |

Kaftanzoglio Stadium, Thessaloniki
Attendance: 25,152
Referee: Jorge Larrionda (Uruguay)

14 August 2004
20:30

| South Korea | 1 – 0 | Mexico |
|---|---|---|
| Kim J.W. 16' | Report |

Karaiskaki Stadium, Piraeus
Attendance: 14,026
Referee: Claus Bo Larsen (Denmark)

17 August 2004
20:30

| South Korea | 3 – 3 | Mali |
|---|---|---|
| Cho J.J. 57', 59'; Tamboura 64' (o.g.) | Report | N'Diaye 7', 24', 55' |

Kaftanzoglio Stadium, Thessaloniki
Attendance: 3,320
Referee: Éric Poulat (France)

Quarterfinals

21 August 2004
21:00

| Paraguay | 3 – 2 | South Korea |
|---|---|---|
| Bareiro 19', 71'; Cardozo 61' | Report | Lee C.S. 74', 79' (pen.) |

Kaftanzoglio Stadium, Thessaloniki
Attendance: 4,080
Referee: Massimo De Santis (Italy)

== Gymnastics ==
=== Artistic ===
Men
Team

| Athlete | Event | Qualification | | | | | | | | Final | | | | | | | |
| Athlete | Event | Apparatus | | | | | | Total | Rank | Apparatus | | | | | | Total | Rank |
| Athlete | Event | F | PH | R | V | PB | HB | Total | Rank | F | PH | R | V | PB | HB | Total | Rank |
|---|---|---|---|---|---|---|---|---|---|---|---|---|---|---|---|---|---|
| Cho Seong-min | Team | 8.600 | —N/a | 9.612 | 9.412 | 9.650 | —N/a | | | Did not compete | | | | | | | |
| Kim Dae-eun | Team | 9.437 | 9.537 | 9.700 | 9.600 | 9.075 | 9.462 | 56.811 | 11 Q | 8.862 | —N/a | 9.712 | 9.562 | 9.525 | —N/a | | |
| Kim Dong-hwa | Team | —N/a | 9.462 | 9.700 | 9.325 | —N/a | 9.525 | —N/a | | —N/a | | 9.750 | —N/a | | 9.575 | —N/a | |
| Kim Seung-il | Team | 8.775 | 8.800 | —N/a | 9.437 | 9.612 | 9.700 | —N/a | | 9.600 | 9.600 | —N/a | 9.425 | 9.525 | 9.575 | —N/a | |
| Lee Sun-sung | Team | —N/a | 9.137 | 9.625 | —N/a | 9.425 | 9.712 | —N/a | | —N/a | 9.587 | —N/a | | | 9.525 | —N/a | |
| Yang Tae-young | Team | 9.700 | 9.625 | 9.625 | 9.650 | 9.587 | 9.737 | 57.924 | 2 Q | 9.675 | 9.450 | 9.637 | 9.575 | 9.687 | —N/a | | |
| Total | Team | 36.512 | 37.761 | 38.650 | 38.099 | 38.274 | 38.674 | 227.970 | 7 Q | 28.137 | 28.637 | 29.099 | 28.562 | 28.737 | 28.675 | 274.375 | 4 |

Individual finals

| Athlete | Event | Apparatus | | | | | | Total | Rank |
| Athlete | Event | F | PH | R | V | PB | HB | Total | Rank |
|---|---|---|---|---|---|---|---|---|---|
| Kim Dae-eun | All-around | 9.650 | 9.537 | 9.712 | 9.412 | 9.775 | 9.725 | 57.811 | 2nd place, silver medalist(s) |
| Yang Tae-young | All-around | 9.512 | 9.650 | 9.725 | 9.700 | 9.712 | 9.475 | 57.774 | 3rd place, bronze medalist(s) |

Women

| Athlete | Event | Qualification | | | | | | Final | | | | | |
| Athlete | Event | Apparatus | | | | Total | Rank | Apparatus | | | | Total | Rank |
| Athlete | Event | V | UB | BB | F | Total | Rank | V | UB | BB | F | Total | Rank |
|---|---|---|---|---|---|---|---|---|---|---|---|---|---|
| Park Kyung-ah | All-around | 8.512 | 7.937 | 7.437 | 7.812 | 31.698 | 62 | Did not advance | | | | | |

== Handball ==
=== Men's tournament ===
Roster

The following is the South Korea roster in the men's handball tournament of the 2004 Summer Olympics.

Head coaches: Kim Tae-hoon

| No. | Pos. | Name | Date of birth (age) | Height | App. | Goals | Club |
|---|---|---|---|---|---|---|---|
| 1 | GK | Han Kyung-tai | 11 April 1975 (aged 29) | 1.91 m | | | (Switzerland) BSV Bern |
| 5 | LW | Kim Tea-wan | 15 February 1980 (aged 24) | 1.83 m | | | (South Korea) Chungcheong HB |
| 6 | RW | Kim Sung-heon | 2 September 1974 (aged 29) | 1.89 m | | | (Japan) Daido Steel |
| 7 | LB | Yoon Kyung-min | 31 October 1979 (aged 24) | 1.93 m | | | (South Korea) Chungcheong HB |
| 8 | LB | Lim Duk-jun | 30 August 1980 (aged 23) | 1.86 m | | | (South Korea) Doosan Handball Club |
| 9 | RB | Choi Seung-wook | 13 March 1982 (aged 22) | 1.82 m | | | (South Korea) Doosan Handball Club |
| 10 | P | Park Chan-yong | 1 January 1980 (aged 24) | 1.89 m | | | (South Korea) HC Korosa |
| 11 | LB | Oh Yun-suk | 1 March 1984 (aged 20) | 1.96 m | | | (South Korea) Sungkyunkwan University |
| 12 | GK | Lee Chang-woo | 12 May 1983 (aged 21) | 1.87 m | | | (South Korea) Kyung Hee University |
| 13 | RB | Yoon Kyung-shin | 7 July 1973 (aged 31) | 2.03 m | | | (Germany) VfL Gummersbach |
| 14 | P | Park Min-chul | 23 December 1974 (aged 29) | 1.91 m | | | (South Korea) Chungcheong HB |
| 15 | LW | Lee Tea-young | 25 November 1977 (aged 26) | 1.74 m | | | (South Korea) HC Korosa |
| 17 | CB | Lee Jae-woo | 28 September 1979 (aged 24) | 1.82 m | | | (South Korea) HC Korosa |
| 19 | RW | Ji Seung-hyun | 7 January 1979 (aged 25) | 1.79 m | | | (South Korea) Doosan Handball Club |
| 20 | CB | Paek Won-chul | 10 January 1977 (aged 27) | 1.80 m | | | (Japan) Daido Steel |

Group play

| Pos | Team | Pld | W | D | L | GF | GA | GD | Pts | Qualification |
|---|---|---|---|---|---|---|---|---|---|---|
| 1 | Croatia | 5 | 5 | 0 | 0 | 146 | 129 | +17 | 10 | Quarterfinals |
| 2 | Spain | 5 | 4 | 0 | 1 | 154 | 137 | +17 | 8 | Quarterfinals |
| 3 | South Korea | 5 | 2 | 0 | 3 | 148 | 148 | 0 | 4 (Note: South Korea 35–32 Russia) | Quarterfinals |
| 4 | Russia | 5 | 2 | 0 | 3 | 145 | 145 | 0 | 4 | Quarterfinals |
| 5 | Iceland | 5 | 1 | 0 | 4 | 143 | 158 | −15 | 2 (Note: Iceland 30–25 Slovenia) | |
| 6 | Slovenia | 5 | 1 | 0 | 4 | 130 | 149 | −19 | 2 | |

Rules for classification: 1) Points; 2) Head-to-head points; 3) Head-to-head goal difference; 4) Head-to-head goals scored; 5) Goal difference; 6) Goals scored; 7) Draw.
Notes:

| 14 August 2004; 09:30 | Spain | 31 - 30 | South Korea | Sports Pavilion, Athens; Referees: Bavas, Migas (GRE) |
| 14 August 2004; 09:30 | García 6 | (17-12) | Yoon K, Paek 6 | Sports Pavilion, Athens; Referees: Bavas, Migas (GRE) |
| 14 August 2004; 09:30 | 3× (yellow card) 8× (suspension) 1× (red card) | | 4× (yellow card) 3× (suspension) 1× (red card) | Sports Pavilion, Athens; Referees: Bavas, Migas (GRE) |

| 16 August 2004; 09:30 | South Korea | 35 - 32 | Russia | Sports Pavilion, Athens; Referees: Hansson, Olsson (SWE) |
| 16 August 2004; 09:30 | Yoon K, Lee J 7 | (16-16) | Kokcharov 6 | Sports Pavilion, Athens; Referees: Hansson, Olsson (SWE) |
| 16 August 2004; 09:30 | 3× (yellow card) 2× (suspension) | | 3× (yellow card) 2× (suspension) | Sports Pavilion, Athens; Referees: Hansson, Olsson (SWE) |

| 18 August 2004; 09:30 | Croatia | 29 - 26 | South Korea | Sports Pavilion, Athens; Referees: Bord, Buy (FRA) |
| 18 August 2004; 09:30 | Džomba 9 | (12-10) | Yoon K 8 | Sports Pavilion, Athens; Referees: Bord, Buy (FRA) |
| 18 August 2004; 09:30 | 3× (yellow card) 6× (suspension) | | 3× (yellow card) 3× (suspension) | Sports Pavilion, Athens; Referees: Bord, Buy (FRA) |

| 20 August 2004; 09:30 | South Korea | 34 - 30 | Iceland | Sports Pavilion, Athens; Referees: Nachevski, Nachevski (MKD) |
| 20 August 2004; 09:30 | Yoon K 12 | (16-13) | Stefansson 10 | Sports Pavilion, Athens; Referees: Nachevski, Nachevski (MKD) |
| 20 August 2004; 09:30 | 3× (yellow card) 4× (suspension) | | 3× (yellow card) 3× (suspension) 1× (red card) | Sports Pavilion, Athens; Referees: Nachevski, Nachevski (MKD) |

| 22 August 2004; 09:30 | Slovenia | 26 - 23 | South Korea | Sports Pavilion, Athens; Referees: Hassan, Aly (EGY) |
| 22 August 2004; 09:30 | Rutenka 7 | (12-11) | Lee J 6 | Sports Pavilion, Athens; Referees: Hassan, Aly (EGY) |
| 22 August 2004; 09:30 | 4× (yellow card) 8× (suspension) 1× (red card) | | 3× (yellow card) 2× (suspension) | Sports Pavilion, Athens; Referees: Hassan, Aly (EGY) |

Quarterfinals

| 24 August 2004; 14:30 | South Korea | 25 - 30 | Hungary | Sports Pavilion, Athens; Referees: Baum, Goralczyk (POL) |
| 24 August 2004; 14:30 | Yoon K 7 | (13-14) | Nagy 9 | Sports Pavilion, Athens; Referees: Baum, Goralczyk (POL) |
| 24 August 2004; 14:30 | 3× (yellow card) 2× (suspension) | | 3× (yellow card) 5× (suspension) | Sports Pavilion, Athens; Referees: Baum, Goralczyk (POL) |

Classification semifinal (5th–8th place)

| 27 August 2004; 11:30 | Greece | 29 - 24 | South Korea | Helliniko Olympic Indoor Arena; Referees: Nachevski, Nachevski (MKD) |
| 27 August 2004; 11:30 | Balomenos 8 | (16-9) | Yoon 6 | Helliniko Olympic Indoor Arena; Referees: Nachevski, Nachevski (MKD) |
| 27 August 2004; 11:30 | 3× (yellow card) 6× (suspension) 1× (red card) | | 3× (yellow card) 1× (suspension) | Helliniko Olympic Indoor Arena; Referees: Nachevski, Nachevski (MKD) |

7th place match

| 28 August 2004; 14:30 | South Korea | 24 - 31 | Spain | Helliniko Olympic Indoor Arena; Referees: Gardinovacki, Maric (SCG) |
| 28 August 2004; 14:30 | Yoon K 7 | (11-12) | Colón 7 | Helliniko Olympic Indoor Arena; Referees: Gardinovacki, Maric (SCG) |
| 28 August 2004; 14:30 | 3× (yellow card) 2× (suspension) | | 3× (yellow card) 2× (suspension) | Helliniko Olympic Indoor Arena; Referees: Gardinovacki, Maric (SCG) |

=== Women's tournament ===
Roster

The following is the South Korea roster in the women's handball tournament of the 2004 Summer Olympics.

Head coaches: Lim Young-chul

| No. | Pos. | Name | Date of birth (age) | Height | App. | Goals | Club |
|---|---|---|---|---|---|---|---|
| 1 | GK | Oh Yong-ran | 6 September 1972 (aged 31) | 1.71 m |
| 2 | RW | Woo Sun-hee | 1 July 1978 (aged 26) | 1.72 m | | | (South Korea) Samcheok Handball |
| 4 | P | Huh Soon-young | 28 September 1975 (aged 28) | 1.80 m | | | (South Korea) Daegu Handball |
| 5 | LW | Lee Gong-joo | 25 March 1980 (aged 24) | 1.63 m | | | (South Korea) Busan Sports Council |
| 7 | LW | Jang So-hee | 15 March 1978 (aged 26) | 1.63 m | | | (South Korea) Daegu Handball |
| 8 | RW | Kim Hyun-ok | 14 May 1974 (aged 30) | 1.68 m |
| 9 | P | Kim Cha-youn | 10 January 1981 (aged 23) | 1.73 m | | | (South Korea) Daegu Handball |
| 10 | LB | Oh Seong-ok | 10 October 1972 (aged 31) | 1.70 m | | | (Japan) Hiroshima Maple Reds |
| 11 | CB | Huh Young-sook | 2 July 1975 (aged 29) | 1.70 m | | | (South Korea) Busan Sports Council |
| 12 | GK | Moon Kyeong-ha | 29 May 1980 (aged 24) | 1.74 m | | | (South Korea) Changwon City Racing Council |
| 13 | CB | Lim O-kyeong | 11 December 1971 (aged 32) | 1.67 m | | | (Japan) Hiroshima Maple Reds |
| 15 | LB | Lee Sang-eun | 5 March 1975 (aged 29) | 1.72 m |
| 17 | RB | Myoung Bok-hee | 29 January 1979 (aged 25) | 1.68 m |
| 19 | RB | Choi Im-jeong | 14 February 1981 (aged 23) | 1.80 m | | | (South Korea) Daegu Handball |
| 20 | LB | Moon Pil-hee | 2 December 1982 (aged 21) | 1.68 m | | | (South Korea) Korea National University |

Group play

| Pos | Team | Pld | W | D | L | GF | GA | GD | Pts | Qualification |
|---|---|---|---|---|---|---|---|---|---|---|
| 1 | South Korea | 4 | 3 | 1 | 0 | 135 | 103 | +32 | 7 (Note: South Korea 29–29 Denmark) | Quarterfinals |
| 2 | Denmark | 4 | 3 | 1 | 0 | 125 | 98 | +27 | 7 | Quarterfinals |
| 3 | France | 4 | 2 | 0 | 2 | 105 | 106 | −1 | 4 | Quarterfinals |
| 4 | Spain | 4 | 0 | 1 | 3 | 86 | 110 | −24 | 1 (Note: Spain 24–24 Angola) | Quarterfinals |
| 5 | Angola | 4 | 0 | 1 | 3 | 97 | 131 | −34 | 1 | |

Rules for classification: 1) Points; 2) Head-to-head points; 3) Head-to-head goal difference; 4) Head-to-head goals scored; 5) Goal difference; 6) Goals scored; 7) Draw.
Notes:

| 17 August 2004; 19:30 | South Korea | 29 - 29 | Denmark | Sports Pavilion, Athens; Referees: Bavas, Migas (GRE) |
| 17 August 2004; 19:30 | Woo 8 | (14-13) | Kiærskou, Fruelund 7 | Sports Pavilion, Athens; Referees: Bavas, Migas (GRE) |
| 17 August 2004; 19:30 | 3× (yellow card) 7× (suspension) | | 3× (yellow card) 3× (suspension) | Sports Pavilion, Athens; Referees: Bavas, Migas (GRE) |

| 19 August 2004; 14:30 | Angola | 30 – 40 | South Korea | Sports Pavilion, Athens; Referees: Nachevski, Nachevski (MKD) |
| 19 August 2004; 14:30 | Ilda 11 | (12-19) | Oh 10 | Sports Pavilion, Athens; Referees: Nachevski, Nachevski (MKD) |
| 19 August 2004; 14:30 | 3× (yellow card) 1× (suspension) | | 3× (yellow card) 3× (suspension) | Sports Pavilion, Athens; Referees: Nachevski, Nachevski (MKD) |

| 21 August 2004; 19:30 | South Korea | 36 - 21 | Spain | Sports Pavilion, Athens; Referees: Pozeznik, Repensek (SLO) |
| 21 August 2004; 19:30 | Woo, Lee S 7 | (20-7) | Gomėz 5 | Sports Pavilion, Athens; Referees: Pozeznik, Repensek (SLO) |
| 21 August 2004; 19:30 | 3× (yellow card) 3× (suspension) | | 3× (yellow card) 4× (suspension) | Sports Pavilion, Athens; Referees: Pozeznik, Repensek (SLO) |

| 23 August 2004; 14:30 | France | 23 - 30 | South Korea | Sports Pavilion, Athens; Referees: Arnaldsson, Vidarsson (ISL) |
| 23 August 2004; 14:30 | Wendling 8 | (13-18) | Lim 8 | Sports Pavilion, Athens; Referees: Arnaldsson, Vidarsson (ISL) |
| 23 August 2004; 14:30 | 3× (yellow card) 3× (suspension) | | 3× (yellow card) 4× (suspension) | Sports Pavilion, Athens; Referees: Arnaldsson, Vidarsson (ISL) |

Quarterfinals

| 26 August 2004; 19:30 | South Korea | 26 – 24 | Brazil | Helliniko Olympic Indoor Arena; Referees: Breto, Huelin Trillo (ESP) |
| 26 August 2004; 19:30 | Lee S 7 | (16-9) | L. Silva 7 | Helliniko Olympic Indoor Arena; Referees: Breto, Huelin Trillo (ESP) |
| 26 August 2004; 19:30 | 3× (yellow card) 6× (suspension) | | 3× (yellow card) 6× (suspension) | Helliniko Olympic Indoor Arena; Referees: Breto, Huelin Trillo (ESP) |

Semifinals

| 27 August 2004; 19:30 | France | 31 - 32 | South Korea | Helliniko Olympic Indoor Arena; Referees: Oie, Togstad (NOR) |
| 27 August 2004; 19:30 | Pecqueux-Rolland, Cano 6 | (10-13) | Lee G 7 | Helliniko Olympic Indoor Arena; Referees: Oie, Togstad (NOR) |
| 27 August 2004; 19:30 | 3× (yellow card) 4× (suspension) | | 3× (yellow card) 3× (suspension) | Helliniko Olympic Indoor Arena; Referees: Oie, Togstad (NOR) |

Gold medal final

29 August 2004
10:45
Denmark
38 - 36 (ET)
South Korea
Helliniko Indoor Arena
Referees: Baum, Goralczyk (POL)
Fruelund 15
(14-14)
Lee S 9
3× (yellow card) 1× (suspension)

4× (yellow card) 4× (suspension)

FT: 25-25 ET: 29-29, 34-34

== Judo ==
Thirteen South Korean judoka (seven males and six females) qualified for the 2004 Summer Olympics.

Men

| Athlete | Event | Preliminary | Round of 32 | Round of 16 | Quarterfinals | Semifinals | Repechage 1 | Repechage 2 | Repechage 3 | Final / BM | |
| Athlete | Event | Opposition Result | Opposition Result | Opposition Result | Opposition Result | Opposition Result | Opposition Result | Opposition Result | Opposition Result | Opposition Result | Rank |
|---|---|---|---|---|---|---|---|---|---|---|---|
| Choi Min-ho | −60 kg | Bye | Paischer (AUT); W 1100–0001 | Darbelet (FRA); W 0113–0101 | Tsagaanbaatar (MGL); L 0000–1000 | Did not advance | Bye | Shah (IND); W 1100–0000 | Gussenberg (GER); W 1110–0000 | Akhondzadeh (IRI); W 1002–0000 | 3rd place, bronze medalist(s) |
| Bang Gui-man | −66 kg | —N/a | Guimarães (BRA); L 0000–1001 | Did not advance | | | | | | | |
| Lee Won-hee | −73 kg | Bye | Laryukov (BLR); W 0021–0011 | Pedro (USA); W 1100–0010 | Bilodid (UKR); W 1000–0000 | Bivol (MDA); W 1000–0100 | Bye | | | Makarov (RUS); W 1021–0001 | 1st place, gold medalist(s) |
| Kwon Young-woo | −81 kg | —N/a | Claverie (FRA); W 0111–0001 | Arteaga (CUB); W 0010–0001 | Iliadis (GRE); L 0000–0001 | Did not advance | Bye | Endicott- Davies (AUS); W 1001–0000 | Canto (BRA); L 0000–1000 | Did not advance | |
| Hwang Hee-tae | −90 kg | —N/a | Matyjaszek (POL); W 1000–0000 | Huizinga (NED); W 0001–0000 | Morgan (CAN); W 0200–0000 | Izumi (JPN); L 0001–0101 | Bye | | | Taov (RUS); L 0000–1010 | 5 |
| Jang Sung-ho | −100 kg | Bye | Moussima (CMR); W 1000–0000 | Ferguson (USA); W 0011–0010 | Ze'evi (ISR); W 1002–0110 | Jurack (GER); W 1001–0000 | Bye | | | Makarau (BLR); L 0020–0101 | 2nd place, silver medalist(s) |
| Kim Sung-bum | +100 kg | Ruano (ESP); W 0010–0001 | Bianchessi (ITA); L 0000–0200 | Did not advance | | | Polyanskyy (UKR); W 1000–0000 | van der Geest (NED); L 0001–1000 | Did not advance | | |

Women

| Athlete | Event | Round of 32 | Round of 16 | Quarterfinals | Semifinals | Repechage 1 | Repechage 2 | Repechage 3 | Final / BM | |
| Athlete | Event | Opposition Result | Opposition Result | Opposition Result | Opposition Result | Opposition Result | Opposition Result | Opposition Result | Opposition Result | Rank |
|---|---|---|---|---|---|---|---|---|---|---|
| Ye Gue-rin | −48 kg | Bye | Yıldız (TUR); W 0010–0001 | Matijass (GER); L 0000–1000 | Did not advance | Bye | Lepage (CAN); W 0011–0000 | Gao F (CHN); L 0001–0002 | Did not advance | |
| Lee Eun-hee | −52 kg | Bye | Savón (CUB); L 0000–1010 | Did not advance | | Askelöf (SWE); L 0000–1001 | Did not advance | | | |
| Lee Bok-hee | −63 kg | Bye | Krukower (ARG); L 0000–0001 | Did not advance | | Décosse (FRA); L 0100–0111 | Did not advance | | | |
| Kim Mi-jung | −70 kg | Jacques (BEL); L 0010–0011 | Did not advance | | | | | | | |
| Lee So-yeon | −78 kg | Matrosova (UKR); L 0000–1000 | Did not advance | | | Akritidou (GRE); W 1000–0000 | Wilding (GBR); W 0001–0000 | Laborde (CUB); L 0022–0030 | Did not advance | |
| Choi Sook-ie | +78 kg | Bye | Donguzashvili (RUS); L 0001–1100 | Did not advance | | Ramadan (EGY); W 1000–0000 | Andolina (ITA); W 0020–0001 | Prokofyeva (UKR); L 0000–1000 | Did not advance | |

== Modern pentathlon ==
Two South Korean athletes qualified to compete in the modern pentathlon event through the Asian Championships.

| Athlete | Event | Shooting (10 m air pistol) | | | Fencing (épée one touch) | | | Swimming (200 m freestyle) | | | Riding (show jumping) | | | Running (3000 m) | | | Total points | Final rank |
| Athlete | Event | Points | Rank | MP Points | Results | Rank | MP points | Time | Rank | MP points | Penalties | Rank | MP points | Time | Rank | MP Points | Total points | Final rank |
|---|---|---|---|---|---|---|---|---|---|---|---|---|---|---|---|---|---|---|
| Han Do-ryung | Men's | 183 | 5 | 1132 | 15–16 | =15 | 804 | 2:09.78 | 20 | 1244 | 392 | 29 | 808 | 10:13.85 | 26 | 948 | 4936 | 24 |
| Lee Choon-huan | Men's | 175 | 16 | 1036 | 12–19 | =26 | 720 | 2:12.02 | =22 | 1216 | 84 | 9 | 1116 | 10:05.85 | 20 | 980 | 5068 | 21 |

== Rowing ==
South Korean rowers qualified the following boats:

Men

| Athlete | Event | Heats | | Repechage | | Semifinals | | Final | |
| Athlete | Event | Time | Rank | Time | Rank | Time | Rank | Time | Rank |
|---|---|---|---|---|---|---|---|---|---|
| Ham Jung-wook | Single sculls | 7:50.39 | 5 R | 7:11.38 | 3 SD/E | 7:33.70 | 3 FD | 7:10.44 | 22 |

Women

| Athlete | Event | Heats | | Repechage | | Semifinals | | Final | |
| Athlete | Event | Time | Rank | Time | Rank | Time | Rank | Time | Rank |
|---|---|---|---|---|---|---|---|---|---|
| Lee Yoon-hui | Single sculls | 8:04.48 | 5 R | 7:59.53 | 5 SC/D | 8:03.01 | 4 FD | 7:53.33 | 20 |

Qualification Legend: FA=Final A (medal); FB=Final B (non-medal); FC=Final C (non-medal); FD=Final D (non-medal); FE=Final E (non-medal); FF=Final F (non-medal); SA/B=Semifinals A/B; SC/D=Semifinals C/D; SE/F=Semifinals E/F; R=Repechage

== Sailing ==
South Korean sailors have qualified one boat for each of the following events.

Men

| Athlete | Event | Race | | | | | | | | | | | Net points | Final rank |
| Athlete | Event | 1 | 2 | 3 | 4 | 5 | 6 | 7 | 8 | 9 | 10 | M* | Net points | Final rank |
|---|---|---|---|---|---|---|---|---|---|---|---|---|---|---|
| Ok Duck-pil | Mistral | 31 | 24 | 28 | 28 | 27 | ~~DNF~~ | 16 | 22 | 23 | 22 | 15 | 236 | 27 |
| Jung Sung-ahn; Kim Dae-young | 470 | 6 | 19 | 24 | 25 | 26 | 27 | 24 | 2 | ~~OCS~~ | 2 | 16 | 171 | 23 |

Open

| Athlete | Event | Race | | | | | | | | | | | Net points | Final rank |
| Athlete | Event | 1 | 2 | 3 | 4 | 5 | 6 | 7 | 8 | 9 | 10 | M* | Net points | Final rank |
|---|---|---|---|---|---|---|---|---|---|---|---|---|---|---|
| Kim Ho-kon | Laser | 17 | 34 | 14 | 35 | 30 | 24 | 11 | 30 | ~~37~~ | 37 | 23 | 255 | 32 |

M = Medal race; OCS = On course side of the starting line; DSQ = Disqualified; DNF = Did not finish; DNS= Did not start; RDG = Redress given

== Shooting ==
Sixteen South Korean shooters (seven men and nine women) qualified to compete in the following events:

Men

| Athlete | Event | Qualification | | Final | |
| Athlete | Event | Points | Rank | Points | Rank |
|---|---|---|---|---|---|
| Cheon Min-ho | 10 m air rifle | 595 | 5 Q | 696.6 | 4 |
| Je Sung-tae | 10 m air rifle | 594 (100) | 8 Q | 696.3 | 6 |
| Jin Jong-oh | 10 m air pistol | 582 | 7 Q | 682.9 | 5 |
| Jin Jong-oh | 50 m pistol | 567 | 1 Q | 661.5 | 2nd place, silver medalist(s) |
| Kang Hyung-chul | 25 m rapid fire pistol | 580 | 11 | Did not advance | |
| Lee Sang-do | 10 m air pistol | 574 | =27 | Did not advance | |
| Lee Sang-do | 50 m pistol | 550 | =24 | Did not advance | |
| Lee Suk-tae | Skeet | 114 | =37 | Did not advance | |
| Park Bong-duk | 50 m rifle prone | 591 | =24 | Did not advance | |
| Park Bong-duk | 50 m rifle 3 positions | 1162 | =9 | Did not advance | |

Women

| Athlete | Event | Qualification | | Final | |
| Athlete | Event | Points | Rank | Points | Rank |
|---|---|---|---|---|---|
| Ahn Soo-kyeong | 10 m air pistol | 382 | =10 | Did not advance | |
| Ahn Soo-kyeong | 25 m pistol | 577 | =13 | Did not advance | |
| Cho Eun-young | 10 m air rifle | 394 | =14 | Did not advance | |
| Kim Jung-mi | 50 m rifle 3 positions | 561 | 30 | Did not advance | |
| Kim Yeun-hee | Skeet | 67 | =9 | Did not advance | |
| Lee Bo-na | Trap | 60 (2) | 6 Q | 83 | 3rd place, bronze medalist(s) |
| Lee Bo-na | Double trap | 110 | 2 Q | 145 | 2nd place, silver medalist(s) |
| Lee Hye-jin | 50 m rifle 3 positions | 584 | 5 Q | 681.0 | 5 |
| Park Ah-young | 10 m air pistol | 379 | =21 | Did not advance | |
| Seo Joo-hyung | 25 m pistol | 582 | 7 Q | 680.8 | 7 |
| Seo Sun-hwa | 10 m air rifle | 391 | =27 | Did not advance | |

== Swimming ==
South Korean swimmers earned qualifying standards in the following events (up to a maximum of 2 swimmers in each event at the A-standard time, and 1 at the B-standard time): Nam Yoo-Sun became the first ever South Korean swimmer to reach an Olympic final in the women's 400 m individual medley, setting up a new South Korean record.

Men

| Athlete | Event | Heat | | Semifinal | | Final | |
| Athlete | Event | Time | Rank | Time | Rank | Time | Rank |
|---|---|---|---|---|---|---|---|
| Cho Sung-mo | 1500 m freestyle | 15:43.43 | 25 | —N/a | | Did not advance | |
| Han Kyu-chul | 200 m freestyle | 1:52.28 | 33 | Did not advance | | | |
| Jeong Doo-hee | 100 m butterfly | 54.76 | 38 | Did not advance | | | |
| Jeong Doo-hee | 200 m butterfly | 2:00.96 | 24 | Did not advance | | | |
| Kim Bang-hyun | 200 m individual medley | 2:05.06 | 32 | Did not advance | | | |
| Kim Bang-hyun | 400 m individual medley | 4:23.05 NR | 20 | —N/a | | Did not advance | |
| Lee Chung-hee | 50 m freestyle | 23.20 | 35 | Did not advance | | | |
| Lee Chung-hee | 100 m freestyle | 51.74 | =45 | Did not advance | | | |
| Park Tae-hwan | 400 m freestyle | DSQ | | —N/a | | Did not advance | |
| Sung Min | 100 m backstroke | 56.78 | 30 | Did not advance | | | |
| Sung Min | 200 m backstroke | 2:04.86 | 32 | Did not advance | | | |
| You Seung-hun | 100 m breaststroke | 1:03.56 | 31 | Did not advance | | | |

Women

| Athlete | Event | Heat | | Semifinal | | Final | |
| Athlete | Event | Time | Rank | Time | Rank | Time | Rank |
|---|---|---|---|---|---|---|---|
| Ha Eun-ju | 400 m freestyle | 4:21.65 | 32 | —N/a | | Did not advance | |
| Kim Hyun-joo | 200 m freestyle | 2:03.33 | 26 | Did not advance | | | |
| Kwon You-ri | 800 m freestyle | 9:01.42 | 22 | —N/a | | Did not advance | |
| Kwon You-ri | 200 m butterfly | 2:14.30 | 24 | Did not advance | | | |
| Lee Da-hye | 200 m backstroke | 2:17.73 | 25 | Did not advance | | | |
| Lee Ji-young | 100 m breaststroke | 1:12.93 | 34 | Did not advance | | | |
| Lee Ji-young | 200 m breaststroke | 2:34.55 | 24 | Did not advance | | | |
| Nam Yoo-sun | 400 m individual medley | 4:45.16 NR | 8 Q | —N/a | | 4:50.35 | 7 |
| Park Kyung-hwa | 100 m butterfly | 1:02.52 | 33 | Did not advance | | | |
| Park Na-ri | 200 m individual medley | 2:21.48 | 26 | Did not advance | | | |
| Ryu Yoon-ji | 50 m freestyle | 26.26 | 28 | Did not advance | | | |
| Ryu Yoon-ji | 100 m freestyle | 56.02 | 17 Q* | 55.85 | 15 | Did not advance | |
| Shim Min-ji | 100 m backstroke | 1:03.14 | 24 | Did not advance | | | |
| Kim Hyun-joo; Ryu Yoon-ji; Shim Min-ji; Sun So-eun | 4 × 100 m freestyle relay | 3:44.84 | 9 | —N/a | | Did not advance | |

== Synchronized swimming ==
Two South Korean synchronized swimmers qualified a spot in the women's duet.

| Athlete | Event | Technical routine | | Free routine (preliminary) | | | Free routine (final) | | |
| Athlete | Event | Points | Rank | Points | Total (technical + free) | Rank | Points | Total (technical + free) | Rank |
|---|---|---|---|---|---|---|---|---|---|
| Kim Sung-eun; Yoo Na-mi | Duet | 43.834 | 14 | 44.250 | 88.084 | =14 | Did not advance | | |

== Table tennis ==
Nine South Korean table tennis players qualified for the following events.

Men

| Athlete | Event | Round 1 | Round 2 | Round 3 | Round 4 | Quarterfinals | Semifinals | Final | |
| Athlete | Event | Opposition Result | Opposition Result | Opposition Result | Opposition Result | Opposition Result | Opposition Result | Opposition Result | Rank |
|---|---|---|---|---|---|---|---|---|---|
| Joo Se-hyuk | Singles | Bye | | Liu (ARG); W 4–0 | Wang Lq (CHN); L 1–4 | Did not advance | | | |
| Oh Sang-eun | Singles | Bye | | Chen Wx (AUT); W 4–3 | Chuang C-Y (TPE); L 2–4 | Did not advance | | | |
| Ryu Seung-min | Singles | Bye | | Matsushita (JPN); W 4–0 | Chiang P-L (TPE); W 4–3 | Leung C Y (HKG); W 4–2 | Waldner (SWE); W 4–1 | Wang H (CHN); W 4–2 | 1st place, gold medalist(s) |
| Joo Se-hyuk; Oh Sang-eun | Doubles | —N/a | Bye | Hielscher / Roßkopf (GER); W 4–1 | Ko L C / Li C (HKG); L 1–4 | Did not advance | | | |
| Lee Chul-seung; Ryu Seung-min | Doubles | —N/a | Bye | | Boll / Fejer-Konnerth (GER); W 4–0 | Mazunov / Smirnov (RUS); L 1–4 | Did not advance | | |

Women

| Athlete | Event | Round 1 | Round 2 | Round 3 | Round 4 | Quarterfinals | Semifinals | Final / BM | |
| Athlete | Event | Opposition Result | Opposition Result | Opposition Result | Opposition Result | Opposition Result | Opposition Result | Opposition Result | Rank |
|---|---|---|---|---|---|---|---|---|---|
| Kim Kyung-ah | Singles | Bye | | Tan Wl (ITA); W 4–1 | Fukuhara (JPN); W 4–1 | Tie Y N (HKG); W 4–1 | Zhang Yn (CHN); L 1–4 | Li Jw (SIN); W 4–1 | 3rd place, bronze medalist(s) |
| Lee Eun-sil | Singles | Bye | | Zhang Xl (SIN); L 1–4 | Did not advance | | | | |
| Yoon Ji-he | Singles | Banh (USA); L 3–4 | Did not advance | | | | | | |
| Kim Bok-rae; Kim Kyung-ah | Doubles | Bye | | Banh / Gao J (USA); W 4–0 | Jing Jh / Li Jw (SIN); W 4–3 | Boroš / Vaida (CRO); W 4–0 | Lee E-S / Seok E-M (KOR); L 0–4 | Guo Y / Niu Jf (CHN); L 3–4 | 4 |
| Lee Eun-sil; Seok Eun-mi | Doubles | Bye | | | Tan P F / Zhang Xl (SIN); W 4–0 | Kim H-M / Kim H-H (PRK); W 4–2 | Kim B-R / Kim K-A (KOR); W 4–0 | Wang N / Zhang Yn (CHN); L 0–4 | 2nd place, silver medalist(s) |

== Taekwondo ==
Four South Korean taekwondo athletes qualified for the following events.

| Athlete | Event | Round of 16 | Quarterfinals | Semifinals | Repechage 1 | Repechage 2 | Final / BM | |
| Athlete | Event | Opposition Result | Opposition Result | Opposition Result | Opposition Result | Opposition Result | Opposition Result | Rank |
|---|---|---|---|---|---|---|---|---|
| Song Myeong-seob | Men's −68 kg | Pashayev (AZE); W 15–13 | Roesen (DEN); W 13–11 | Saei (IRI); L 9–9 SUP | Bye | Hussein (EGY); W 8–6 | Silva (BRA); W 12–7 | 3rd place, bronze medalist(s) |
| Moon Dae-sung | Men's +80 kg | Sagindykov (KAZ); W 7–2 | García (ESP); W 6–2 | Gentil (FRA); W 5–3 | Bye | | Nikolaidis (GRE); W KO | 1st place, gold medalist(s) |
| Jang Ji-won | Women's −57 kg | Bah (CIV); W 9–2 | Reyes (ESP); W 3–2 | Salazar (MEX); W 2–1 | Bye | | Abdallah (USA); W 2–1 | 1st place, gold medalist(s) |
| Hwang Kyung-seon | Women's −67 kg | Luo W (CHN); L 8–10 | Did not advance | | Solheim (NOR); W WO | Rivero (PHI); W 6–2 | Juárez (GUA); W 5–2 | 3rd place, bronze medalist(s) |

== Tennis ==
South Korea nominated a male and a female tennis player to compete in the tournament.

| Athlete | Event | Round of 64 | Round of 32 | Round of 16 | Quarterfinals | Semifinals | Final / BM | |
| Athlete | Event | Opposition Score | Opposition Score | Opposition Score | Opposition Score | Opposition Score | Opposition Score | Rank |
|---|---|---|---|---|---|---|---|---|
| Lee Hyung-taik | Men's singles | Zabaleta (ARG); W 4–6, 6–3, 6–2 | González (CHI); L 5–7, 2–6 | Did not advance | | | | |
| Cho Yoon-jeong | Women's singles | Kanepi (EST); W 7–6^{(7–1)}, 6–1 | Schiavone (ITA); L 6–2, 6–7^{(0–7)}, 4–6 | Did not advance | | | | |

== Volleyball ==
=== Women's tournament ===
Roster

The following is the South Korean roster in the women's volleyball tournament of the 2004 Summer Olympics.

Head coach: Kim Cheol-yong

| No. | Name | Date of birth | Height | Weight | Spike | Block | 2004 club |
|---|---|---|---|---|---|---|---|
| 1 | Lee Jung-ok | 19 July 1983 | 1.79 m (5 ft 10 in) | 72 kg (159 lb) | 280 cm (110 in) | 272 cm (107 in) | (South Korea) LG Caltex Oil |
| 3 | Kang Hye-mi | 27 April 1974 | 1.73 m (5 ft 8 in) | 62 kg (137 lb) | 300 cm (120 in) | 285 cm (112 in) | (South Korea) Hyundai E&C |
| 4 | Ku Min-jung (c) | 25 August 1973 | 1.81 m (5 ft 11 in) | 73 kg (161 lb) | 315 cm (124 in) | 300 cm (120 in) | (South Korea) Hyundai E&C |
| 5 | Kim Sa-nee | 21 June 1981 | 1.80 m (5 ft 11 in) | 72 kg (159 lb) | 302 cm (119 in) | 292 cm (115 in) | (South Korea) Korea Expressway Corporation |
| 6 | Choi Kwang-hee | 25 May 1974 | 1.73 m (5 ft 8 in) | 73 kg (161 lb) | 304 cm (120 in) | 289 cm (114 in) | (South Korea) Korea Tobacco & Ginseng |
| 8 | Nam Jie-youn (L) | 25 May 1983 | 1.72 m (5 ft 8 in) | 63 kg (139 lb) | 290 cm (110 in) | 278 cm (109 in) | (South Korea) LG Caltex Oil |
| 9 | Chang So-yun | 11 November 1974 | 1.84 m (6 ft 0 in) | 76 kg (168 lb) | 312 cm (123 in) | 301 cm (119 in) | (South Korea) Hyundai E&C |
| 11 | Kim Mi-jin | 22 July 1979 | 1.82 m (6 ft 0 in) | 65 kg (143 lb) | 300 cm (120 in) | 290 cm (110 in) | (South Korea) Korea Expressway Corporation |
| 12 | Pak Sun-mi | 3 February 1982 | 1.78 m (5 ft 10 in) | 65 kg (143 lb) | 275 cm (108 in) | 268 cm (106 in) | (South Korea) Hyundai E&C |
| 13 | Jung Dae-young | 12 August 1981 | 1.83 m (6 ft 0 in) | 73 kg (161 lb) | 315 cm (124 in) | 308 cm (121 in) | (South Korea) Hyundai E&C |
| 14 | Han Song-yi | 5 September 1984 | 1.85 m (6 ft 1 in) | 67 kg (148 lb) | 304 cm (120 in) | 291 cm (115 in) | (South Korea) Korea Expressway Corporation |
| 15 | Kim Se-young | 4 June 1981 | 1.90 m (6 ft 3 in) | 71 kg (157 lb) | 315 cm (124 in) | 300 cm (120 in) | (South Korea) Korea Tobacco & Ginseng |

Group play

| Pos | Team | Pld | W | L | Pts | SW | SL | SR | SPW | SPL | SPR | Qualification |
|---|---|---|---|---|---|---|---|---|---|---|---|---|
| 1 | Brazil | 5 | 5 | 0 | 10 | 15 | 2 | 7.500 | 410 | 326 | 1.258 | Quarterfinals |
| 2 | Italy | 5 | 4 | 1 | 9 | 14 | 3 | 4.667 | 392 | 305 | 1.285 | Quarterfinals |
| 3 | South Korea | 5 | 3 | 2 | 8 | 9 | 7 | 1.286 | 355 | 352 | 1.009 | Quarterfinals |
| 4 | Japan | 5 | 2 | 3 | 7 | 6 | 10 | 0.600 | 346 | 343 | 1.009 | Quarterfinals |
| 5 | Greece | 5 | 1 | 4 | 6 | 5 | 12 | 0.417 | 349 | 383 | 0.911 | |
| 6 | Kenya | 5 | 0 | 5 | 5 | 0 | 15 | 0.000 | 236 | 379 | 0.623 | |

Source: FIVB

| 14 August 2004; 19:30 | South Korea | 0–3 | Italy | Peace and Friendship Stadium; Attendance: 2,200; Referees: Fernando Nava (MEX), Francisco Medina Guzman (CUB) |
| 14 August 2004; 19:30 | (17–25, 13–25, 19–25) | | | Peace and Friendship Stadium; Attendance: 2,200; Referees: Fernando Nava (MEX), Francisco Medina Guzman (CUB) |

| 16 August 2004; 16:00 | Greece | 1–3 | South Korea | Peace and Friendship Stadium; Attendance: 3,000; Referees: Juan Angel Pereyra (ARG), Francisco Medina Guzman (CUB) |
| 16 August 2004; 16:00 | (25–20, 19–25, 15–25, 22–25) | | | Peace and Friendship Stadium; Attendance: 3,000; Referees: Juan Angel Pereyra (ARG), Francisco Medina Guzman (CUB) |

| 18 August 2004; 11:50 | South Korea | 3–0 | Kenya | Peace and Friendship Stadium; Attendance: 750; Referees: Dejan Jovanović (SCG), Karin Zahorčová (CZE) |
| 18 August 2004; 11:50 | (25–16, 25–20, 25–19) | | | Peace and Friendship Stadium; Attendance: 750; Referees: Dejan Jovanović (SCG), Karin Zahorčová (CZE) |

| 20 August 2004; 16:00 | South Korea | 3–0 | Japan | Peace and Friendship Stadium; Attendance: 6,500; Referees: Frank Leuthässer (GER), Patrick Rachard (FRA) |
| 20 August 2004; 16:00 | (25–21, 26–24, 25–21) | | | Peace and Friendship Stadium; Attendance: 6,500; Referees: Frank Leuthässer (GER), Patrick Rachard (FRA) |

| 22 August 2004; 19:30 | Brazil | 3–0 | South Korea | Peace and Friendship Stadium; Attendance: 8,020; Referees: Dejan Jovanović (SCG), Karin Zahorčová (CZE) |
| 22 August 2004; 19:30 | (25–19, 25–18, 25–23) | | | Peace and Friendship Stadium; Attendance: 8,020; Referees: Dejan Jovanović (SCG), Karin Zahorčová (CZE) |

Quarterfinals

| 24 August 2004; 16:00 | South Korea | 0–3 | Russia | Peace and Friendship Stadium; Attendance: 2,780; Referees: Fernando Nava (MEX), Francisco Medina Guzman (CUB) |
| 24 August 2004; 16:00 | (17–25, 15–25, 22–25) | | | Peace and Friendship Stadium; Attendance: 2,780; Referees: Fernando Nava (MEX), Francisco Medina Guzman (CUB) |

== Weightlifting ==
Eight South Korean weightlifters qualified for the following events:

Men

| Athlete | Event | Snatch | | Clean & Jerk | | Total | Rank |
| Athlete | Event | Result | Rank | Result | Rank | Total | Rank |
|---|---|---|---|---|---|---|---|
| Lee Bae-young | −69 kg | 152.5 | 2 | 190 | 1 | 342.5 | 2nd place, silver medalist(s) |
| Kim Kwang-hoon | −77 kg | 155 | =11 | 195 | =8 | 350 | 10 |
| Song Jong-shik | −85 kg | 160 | =10 | 200 | =5 | 360 | 8 |
| An Yong-kwon | +105 kg | 202.5 | 4 | 225 | =9 | 427.5 | 8 |

Women

| Athlete | Event | Snatch | | Clean & Jerk | | Total | Rank |
| Athlete | Event | Result | Rank | Result | Rank | Total | Rank |
|---|---|---|---|---|---|---|---|
| Kim Soo-kyung | −63 kg | 92.5 | 7 | 122.5 | =3 | 215 | 5 |
| Kang Mi-suk | −69 kg | 100 | 9 | ~~125~~ | DNF | 100 | DNF |
| Kim Soon-hee | −75 kg | 112.5 | =7 | 137.5 | 6 | 250 | 7 |
| Jang Mi-ran | +75 kg | 130 | =1 | 172.5 | 2 | 302.5 | 2nd place, silver medalist(s) |

== Wrestling ==
Key:

- VT - Victory by Fall.
- PP - Decision by Points - the loser with technical points.
- PO - Decision by Points - the loser without technical points.

Men's freestyle

| Athlete | Event | Elimination Pool | | | | Quarterfinal | Semifinal | Final / BM | |
| Athlete | Event | Opposition Result | Opposition Result | Opposition Result | Rank | Opposition Result | Opposition Result | Opposition Result | Rank |
|---|---|---|---|---|---|---|---|---|---|
| Kim Hyo-sub | −55 kg | Nourzad (IRI); L 1–3 ^{PP} | Naranbaatar (MGL); W 3–1 ^{PP} | —N/a | 1 Q | Tanabe (JPN); L 0–4 ^{ST} | Did not advance | Li Zy (CHN); L 1–3 ^{PP} | 6 |
| Jung Young-ho | −60 kg | Cikel (AUT); W 3–1 ^{PP} | Inoue (JPN); L 1–3 ^{PP} | Zakhartdinov (UZB); W 5–0 ^{VT} | 2 | Did not advance | | | 7 |
| Baek Jin-kuk | −66 kg | Jessey (NGR); W 3–1 ^{PP} | Ikematsu (JPN); L 1–3 ^{PP} | —N/a | 2 | Did not advance | | | 14 |
| Moon Eui-jae | −84 kg | Ibragimov (MKD); W 3–0 ^{PO} | Gochev (BUL); W 3–1 ^{PP} | —N/a | 1 Q | Danko (UKR); W 3–1 ^{PP} | Sazhidov (RUS); W 3–1 ^{PP} | Sanderson (USA); L 1–3 ^{PP} | 2nd place, silver medalist(s) |

Men's Greco-Roman

| Athlete | Event | Elimination Pool | | | Quarterfinal | Semifinal | Final / BM | |
| Athlete | Event | Opposition Result | Opposition Result | Rank | Opposition Result | Opposition Result | Opposition Result | Rank |
|---|---|---|---|---|---|---|---|---|
| Im Dae-won | −55 kg | Tengizbayev (KAZ); W 3–1 ^{PP} | Sandu (ROM); W 3–1 ^{PP} | 1 Q | Mamedaliyev (RUS); L 0–3 ^{PO} | Did not advance | | 7 |
| Jung Ji-hyun | −60 kg | Zawadzki (POL); W 3–1 ^{PP} | Rahimov (AZE); W 3–0 ^{PO} | 1 Q | Diaconu (ROM); W 3–0 ^{PO} | Nazaryan (BUL); W 3–1 ^{PP} | Monzón (CUB); W 3–0 ^{PO} | 1st place, gold medalist(s) |
| Kim In-sub | −66 kg | Füredy (HUN); W 3–1 ^{PP} | Gergov (BUL); W 3–0 ^{PO} | 1 Q | Samuelsson (SWE); L 1–3 ^{PP} | Did not advance | Zeidvand (IRI); L 0–5 ^{EV} | DSQ |
| Choi Duk-hoon | −74 kg | Azcuy (CUB); L 1–3 ^{PP} | Truszkowski (POL); W 3–1 ^{PP} | 2 | Did not advance | | | 10 |

Women's freestyle

| Athlete | Event | Elimination Pool | | | Classification | Semifinal | Final / BM | |
| Athlete | Event | Opposition Result | Opposition Result | Rank | Opposition Result | Opposition Result | Opposition Result | Rank |
|---|---|---|---|---|---|---|---|---|
| Lee Na-lae | −55 kg | Gomis (FRA); L 1–3 ^{PP} | Poumpouridou (GRE); W 5–0 ^{VT} | 2 | Sun Dm (CHN); L 1–3 ^{PP} | Did not advance | | 7 |

== See also ==
- South Korea at the 2002 Asian Games
- South Korea at the 2004 Summer Paralympics
