= Taekwondo at the 2000 Summer Olympics – Men's 68 kg =

Taekwondo competition

Men's 68 kg at the Games of the XXVII Olympiad
- Venue: State Sports Centre
- Date: 28 September
- Competitors: 14 from 14 nations

Medalists
1st place, gold medalist(s)		Steven López	United States
2nd place, silver medalist(s)		Sin Joon-Sik	South Korea
3rd place, bronze medalist(s)		Hadi Saei	Iran

The men's 58 kg competition in taekwondo at the 2000 Summer Olympics in Sydney took place on September 28 at the State Sports Centre.

American taekwondo jin Steven López came from behind in the final round to dedeat South Korea's Sin Joon-sik for the gold medal in the men's featherweight class. Meanwhile, Iranian fighter Hadi Saei edged his Turkish-born Austrian opponent Tuncay Çalışkan 4–2 to earn a bronze.

== Competition format ==
The main bracket consisted of a single elimination tournament, culminating in the gold medal match. The taekwondo fighters eliminated in earlier rounds by the two finalists of the main bracket advanced directly to the repechage tournament. These matches determined the bronze medal winner for the event.

== Schedule ==
All times are Greece Standard Time (UTC+2)

Date	Time	Round
Thursday, 28 September 2000	09:00; 11:30; 15:30; 20:30	Preliminary Round; Quarterfinals; Semifinals; Final

== Competitors ==
Athlete	Nation
Alejandro Hernando	Argentina
Hsu Chi-hung	Chinese Taipei
Hadi Saei	Iran
Sin Joon-sik	South Korea
Tuncay Çalışkan	Austria
Nizar Naeeli	Libya
Aslander Dzitiev	Russia
Francisco Zas	Spain
Carlo Massimino	Australia
Steven López	United States
Claudio Nolano	Italy
Aziz Acharki	Germany
Stanislas Ogoudjobi	Benin
Olivier Bernasconi	Monaco

== Results ==
Legend

- KO — Won by knockout
- PTG — Won by points gap
- SUP — Won by superiority
- OT — Won on over time (Golden Point)
- WO — Walkover

=== Main bracket ===
Preliminary round
Hsu Chi-hung (TPE)	2
Hadi Saei (IRI)	5
Sin Joon-sik (KOR)	7
Tuncay Çalışkan (AUT)	3
Nizar Mohamed Naeeli (LBA)	3
Aslanbek Dzitiyev (RUS)	12
Francisco Zas (ESP)	3
Carlo Massimino (AUS)	3+
Steven López (USA)	7
Claudio Nolano (ITA)	0
Aziz Acharki (GER)	7
Stanislas Ogoudjobi (BEN)	0

Quarterfinals
Alejandro Hernando (ARG)	0
Hadi Saei (IRI)	3
Sin Joon-sik (KOR)	9
Aslander Dzitiev (RUS)	1
Carlo Massimino (AUS)	1
Steven López (USA)	1+
Aziz Acharki (GER)	15
Olivier Bernasconi (MON)	1

Semifinals
Hadi Saei (IRI)	3
Sin Joon-sik (KOR)	5
Steven López (USA)	2
Aziz Acharki (GER)	0

Gold medal match
Sin Joon-sik (KOR)	0
Steven López (USA)	1

=== Repechage ===
Quarterfinals
Carlo Massimino (AUS)	9
Claudio Nolano (ITA)	7
Aslander Dzitiev (RUS)	0
Tuncay Çalışkan (AUT)	6

Semifinals
Hadi Saei (IRI)	6
Carlo Massimino (AUS)	5
Aziz Acharki (GER)	7
Tuncay Çalışkan (AUT)	7+

Bronze medal match
Hadi Saei (IRI)	4
Tuncay Çalışkan (AUT)	2
