= Alejandro Hernando =

Argentine Olympic taekwondo practitioner

Personal information
- Full name: Alejandro Fabián Hernando
- Nationality: Argentina
- Born: 5 May 1976 (age 50) San Martín, Buenos Aires, Argentina
- Height: 1.80 m (5 ft 11 in)
- Weight: 68 kg (150 lb)

Sport
- Sport: Taekwondo
- Event: 68 kg
Medal record
Men's taekwondo
Representing Argentina
Pan American Games
Bronze medal – third place	1999 Winnipeg	68 kg

Alejandro Fabián Hernando (born May 5, 1976) is an Argentine taekwondo practitioner, who competed in the men's featherweight category. He captured a bronze medal in the 68-kg division at the 1999 Pan American Games in Winnipeg, Manitoba, Canada, and represented his nation Argentina in two editions of the Olympic Games (2000 and 2004).

Hernando made his official debut at the 2000 Summer Olympics in Sydney, where he competed in the men's featherweight class (68 kg). He moved directly into the quarterfinals with a first round bye, but ended abruptly by losing the match to Iran's Hadi Saei 0–3.

At the 2004 Summer Olympics in Athens, Hernando qualified for his second Argentine team in the men's featherweight class (68 kg), by placing second behind Brazil's Diogo Silva and granting a berth from the Pan American Olympic Qualifying Tournament in Querétaro, Mexico. Unlike his previous Olympics, Hernando failed to edge past the opening round after he was narrowly beaten by Danish neophyte Jesper Roesen at 10–11. With his opponent losing the next bout to South Korea's Song Myeong-seob, Hernando denied his chance to slip into the repechage bracket for the Olympic bronze medal.
