= Tuncay Çalışkan =

Austrian taekwondo practitioner

Personal information
- Full name: Tuncay Çalışkan
- Nationality: Austria
- Born: 9 August 1977 (age 49) Söke, Aydın, Turkey
- Height: 1.80 m (5 ft 11 in)
- Weight: 65 kg (143 lb)

Sport
- Sport: Taekwondo
- Event: 68 kg
- Club: TKD Verein Baden
- Coached by: Mustafa Atalar
Medal record
Men's taekwondo
Representing Austria
World Championships
Bronze medal – third place	2003 Garmisch	72 kg

Tuncay Çalışkan (born 9 August 1977 in Söke, Aydın, Turkey) is a Turkish-born Austrian taekwondo practitioner, who competed in the men's featherweight category. He captured a bronze medal in the 72-kg division at the 2003 World Taekwondo Championships in Garmisch-Partenkirchen, Germany, and attained top seven finishes in two editions of the Olympic Games (2000 and 2004), representing his naturalized nation Austria. Caliskan is also a full-fledged member of Baden Taekwondo Club (German: TKD Verein Baden) and Austrian taekwondo squad, under head coach and master Mustafa Atalar.

Caliskan made his official debut, as part of his naturalized Austrian squad, at the 2000 Summer Olympics in Sydney, where he competed in the men's featherweight class (68 kg). He crashed out in the opening match 3–7 to South Korean fighter and eventual silver medalist Sin Joon-sik, but mounted his strength to edge past Russia's Aslander Dzitiev (0–6) and then scored a 4–4 victory over Germany's Aziz Acharki upon the referees' decision in the repechage rounds. Caliskan secured his place for a chance of an Olympic bronze medal, but narrowly missed out in a tough 2–4 defeat to Iran's Hadi Saei, relegating him to fourth.

At the 2004 Summer Olympics in Athens, Caliskan qualified for his second Austrian squad in the men's featherweight class (68 kg), by placing second behind Azerbaijan's Niyamaddin Pashayev and granting a berth from the European Olympic Qualifying Tournament in Baku, Azerbaijan. In his opening match, Caliskan trailed behind Central African Republic's Bertrand Gbongou Liango 1–4 in the third round, until he knocked his opponent unconscious with a roundhouse kick and dropped him face-down to the mat. Following Caliskan's unprecedented victory, Liango was sent to a nearby hospital and diagnosed with concussion. In the quarterfinal match, Caliskan produced a pattern of aggressive attacks against Chinese Taipei's Huang Chih-hsiung on the final round, but his opponent responded to seal a 10–8 victory over him at the very end. With Huang moving forward into the final, Caliskan fell short of his Olympic medal chance in a 4–8 defeat to Egypt's Tamer Hussein in the repechage.
