= Mohamed Omrani =

Tunisian taekwondo practitioner

Personal information
- Full name: Mohamed Omrani
- Nationality: Tunisia
- Born: 11 August 1979 (age 47) Tunis, Tunisia
- Height: 1.90 m (6 ft 3 in)
- Weight: 68 kg (150 lb)

Sport
- Sport: Taekwondo
- Event: 68 kg

Mohamed Omrani (Arabic: محمد العمراني; born August 11, 1979, in Tunis) is a Tunisian taekwondo practitioner, who competed in the men's featherweight category.

Omrani qualified for the Tunisian squad in the men's featherweight class (68 kg) at the 2004 Summer Olympics in Athens, by placing second behind Egypt's Tamer Abdelmoneim Hussein and granting a berth from the African Olympic Qualifying Tournament in Cairo, Egypt. He lost his opening match to Australian fighter and two-time Olympian Carlo Massimino with a score of 2–7. With his opponent trailing behind Guatemala's Gabriel Sagastume in the quarterfinals, Omrani denied his chance to compete for the Olympic bronze medal through the repechage rounds.
