= Tamer Abdelmoneim Hussein =

Egyptian taekwondo practitioner

Personal information
- Full name: Tamer Abdelmoneim Hussein
- Nationality: Egypt
- Born: 22 November 1974 (age 51) Cairo, Egypt
- Height: 1.78 m (5 ft 10 in)
- Weight: 68 kg (150 lb)

Sport
- Sport: Taekwondo
- Event: 68 kg
Medal record
Men's taekwondo
Representing Egypt
World Championships
Gold medal – first place	1997 Hong Kong	70 kg
Bronze medal – third place	1991 Athens	70 kg

Tamer Abdelmoneim Hussein (Arabic: تامر عبد المنعم حسين; born 22 November 1974 in Cairo) is an Egyptian taekwondo practitioner, who competed in the men's featherweight category. He captured two medals each in the men's 70-kg division at the World Taekwondo Championships (1991 and 1997), and attained a fifth-place finish at the 2004 Summer Olympics, representing his nation Egypt.

Hussein qualified as a 29-year-old for the Egyptian squad in the men's featherweight class (68 kg) at the 2004 Summer Olympics in Athens, by defeating Tunisia's Mohamed Omrani for the top spot and securing a berth from the African Olympic Qualifying Tournament in his native Cairo. Hussein lost his opening match 8–1 to Chinese Taipei's Huang Chih-hsiung, but slipped abruptly into the repechage for a chance to add another Olympic bronze medal for Egypt in the sport, following Huang's progress towards the final. In the repechage, Hussein redeemed from his ill-fated Olympic prelim feat to seal an adamant 8–4 victory over Austria's two-time Olympian Tuncay Çalışkan, before ending his Olympic run by plunging to a 6–8 decision against South Korea's Song Myeong-seob, relegating Hussein to fifth position.
