= Taekwondo at the 2004 Summer Olympics – Men's 68 kg =

Taekwondo competition

Men's 68 kg at the Games of the XXVIII Olympiad
- Venue: Faliro Coastal Zone Olympic Complex
- Date: 27 August
- Competitors: 16 from 16 nations

Medalists
1st place, gold medalist(s)		Hadi Saei	Iran
2nd place, silver medalist(s)		Huang Chih-hsiung	Chinese Taipei
3rd place, bronze medalist(s)		Song Myeong-Seob	South Korea

The men's 68 kg competition in taekwondo at the 2004 Summer Olympics in Athens took place on August 27 at the Faliro Coastal Zone Olympic Complex.

Iran's Hadi Saei secured a tight 4–3 victory over Chinese Taipei's Huang Chih-hsiung to pick up the Olympic gold medal in the event, adding it to his bronze from Sydney four years earlier. Meanwhile, South Korean taekwondo fighter Song Myeong-seob edged his worthy adversary Diogo Silva of Brazil 12–7 to score a bronze.

== Competition format ==
The main bracket consisted of a single elimination tournament, culminating in the gold medal match. The taekwondo fighters eliminated in earlier rounds by the two finalists of the main bracket advanced directly to the repechage tournament. These matches determined the bronze medal winner for the event.

== Schedule ==
All times are Greece Standard Time (UTC+2)

Date	Time	Round
Friday, 27 August 2004	11:00; 16:00; 17:30; 20:30	Preliminary Round; Quarterfinals; Semifinals; Final

== Results ==
Legend

- PTG — Won by points gap
- KO — Won by knockout
- SUP — Won by superiority
- OT — Won on over time (Golden Point)
- WO — Walkover

=== Main bracket ===
Preliminary round
Mohamed Omrani (TUN)	2
Carlo Massimino (AUS)	7
Gabriel Sagastume (GUA)	11
Duncan Mahlangu (RSA)	7
Tuncay Çalışkan (AUT)	KO
Bertrand Gbongou Liango (CAF)	1:45-3
Huang Chih-hsiung (TPE)	8
Tamer Abdelmoneim Hussein (EGY)	1
Hadi Saei (IRI)	RSC
Carlo Molfetta (ITA)	1:53-2
Luis Alberto García (VEN)	5
Diogo Silva (BRA)	6
Alejandro Hernando (ARG)	10
Jesper Roesen (DEN)	11
Song Myeong-Seob (KOR)	15
Niyamaddin Pashayev (AZE)	13

Second round
Carlo Massimino (AUS)	4
Gabriel Sagastume (GUA)	5
Tuncay Çalışkan (AUT)	8
Huang Chih-hsiung (TPE)	10
Hadi Saei (IRI)	8
Diogo Silva (BRA)	6
Jesper Roesen (DEN)	11
Song Myeong-Seob (KOR)	13

Semifinals
Gabriel Sagastume (GUA)	5
Huang Chih-hsiung (TPE)	7
Hadi Saei (IRI)	9+
Song Myeong-Seob (KOR)	9

Gold medal match
Huang Chih-hsiung (TPE)	3
Hadi Saei (IRI)	4

=== Repechage ===
Quarterfinals
Diogo Silva (BRA)	WO
Carlo Molfetta (ITA)
Tuncay Çalışkan (AUT)	4
Tamer Abdelmoneim Hussein (EGY)	8

Semifinals
Gabriel Sagastume (GUA)	10
Diogo Silva (BRA)	12
Song Myeong-Seob (KOR)	8
Tamer Abdelmoneim Hussein (EGY)	6

Bronze medal match
Diogo Silva (BRA)	7
Song Myeong-Seob (KOR)	12
