= 2002 Asian Taekwondo Championships =

Taekwondo competition

- Location: Amman, Jordan
- Dates: 26–28 April 2002

Champions
- Men: South Korea
- Women: South Korea

The 2002 Asian Taekwondo Championships are the 15th edition of the Asian Taekwondo Championships, and were held in Amman, Jordan from April 26 to April 28, 2002.

South Korea dominated the competition, winning twelve gold medals.

== Medal summary ==
=== Men ===
| Event | Gold | Silver | Bronze |
|---|---|---|---|
| Finweight −54 kg | Lee Sang-pil; South Korea | Nguyễn Duy Khương; Vietnam | Mohammad Al-Hamed; Jordan |
| Finweight −54 kg | Lee Sang-pil; South Korea | Nguyễn Duy Khương; Vietnam | Mohammad Bagheri Motamed; Iran |
| Flyweight −58 kg | Ko Seok-hwa; South Korea | Mohammad Yaqoub; Jordan | Behzad Khodadad; Iran |
| Flyweight −58 kg | Ko Seok-hwa; South Korea | Mohammad Yaqoub; Jordan | Satriyo Rahadhani; Indonesia |
| Bantamweight −62 kg | Lee Soon-tae; South Korea | Mohammad Reza Mehdizadeh; Iran | Vũ Anh Tuấn; Vietnam |
| Bantamweight −62 kg | Lee Soon-tae; South Korea | Mohammad Reza Mehdizadeh; Iran | Kiyoteru Higuchi; Japan |
| Featherweight −67 kg | Jamil Al-Khuffash; Jordan | Sung Yu-chi; Chinese Taipei | Kim Dong-eun; South Korea |
| Featherweight −67 kg | Jamil Al-Khuffash; Jordan | Sung Yu-chi; Chinese Taipei | Carlo Massimino; Australia |
| Lightweight −72 kg | Sin Joon-sik; South Korea | Hadi Saei; Iran | Nagd Al-Mutawakel; Yemen |
| Lightweight −72 kg | Sin Joon-sik; South Korea | Hadi Saei; Iran | Iyad Al-Saify; Jordan |
| Welterweight −78 kg | Yousef Karami; Iran | Mitsushige Arita; Japan | Donald Geisler; Philippines |
| Welterweight −78 kg | Yousef Karami; Iran | Mitsushige Arita; Japan | Bertie Collinson; Australia |
| Middleweight −84 kg | Park Cheon-deok; South Korea | Dindo Simpao; Philippines | Ali Tajik; Iran |
| Middleweight −84 kg | Park Cheon-deok; South Korea | Dindo Simpao; Philippines | Arman Chilmanov; Kazakhstan |
| Heavyweight +84 kg | Lee Seok-hun; South Korea | Daniel Trenton; Australia | Abdulqader Al-Adhami; Qatar |
| Heavyweight +84 kg | Lee Seok-hun; South Korea | Daniel Trenton; Australia | Khaled Al-Dosari; Saudi Arabia |

=== Women ===
| Event | Gold | Silver | Bronze |
|---|---|---|---|
| Finweight −47 kg | Kim Hyo-min; South Korea | Nguyễn Thị Huyền Diệu; Vietnam | Li Huang; China |
| Finweight −47 kg | Kim Hyo-min; South Korea | Nguyễn Thị Huyền Diệu; Vietnam | Maria Tseriotis; Australia |
| Flyweight −51 kg | Jang Eun-suk; South Korea | Juana Wangsa Putri; Indonesia | Daleen Cordero; Philippines |
| Flyweight −51 kg | Jang Eun-suk; South Korea | Juana Wangsa Putri; Indonesia | Nguyễn Thị Xuân Mai; Vietnam |
| Bantamweight −55 kg | Jung Jae-eun; South Korea | Cosette Basbous; Lebanon | Minako Hatakeyama; Japan |
| Bantamweight −55 kg | Jung Jae-eun; South Korea | Cosette Basbous; Lebanon | Chonnapas Premwaew; Thailand |
| Featherweight −59 kg | Tseng Pei-hua; Chinese Taipei | Tina Marton; Australia | Wang Shuo; China |
| Featherweight −59 kg | Tseng Pei-hua; Chinese Taipei | Tina Marton; Australia | Lê Thị Nhung; Vietnam |
| Lightweight −63 kg | Oh Jung-ah; South Korea | Su Li-wen; Chinese Taipei | Nadin Dawani; Jordan |
| Lightweight −63 kg | Oh Jung-ah; South Korea | Su Li-wen; Chinese Taipei | Zhang Huijing; China |
| Welterweight −67 kg | Kim Hye-mi; South Korea | Veronica Domingo; Philippines | Zhang Liyue; China |
| Welterweight −67 kg | Kim Hye-mi; South Korea | Veronica Domingo; Philippines | Lara Shdaifat; Jordan |
| Middleweight −72 kg | Chen Zhong; China | Fan Chiao-wen; Chinese Taipei | Park Eun-hee; South Korea |
| Middleweight −72 kg | Chen Zhong; China | Fan Chiao-wen; Chinese Taipei | Margarita Bonifacio; Philippines |
| Heavyweight +72 kg | Kwon Ji-hee; South Korea | Wang I-hsien; Chinese Taipei | Erica Parcio; Australia |
| Heavyweight +72 kg | Kwon Ji-hee; South Korea | Wang I-hsien; Chinese Taipei | Ren Ruihong; China |

== Medal table ==
| Rank | Nation | Gold | Silver | Bronze | Total |
|---|---|---|---|---|---|
| 1 | South Korea | 12 | 0 | 2 | 14 |
| 2 | Chinese Taipei | 1 | 4 | 0 | 5 |
| 3 | Iran | 1 | 2 | 3 | 6 |
| 4 | Jordan | 1 | 1 | 4 | 6 |
| 5 | China | 1 | 0 | 5 | 6 |
| 6 | Australia | 0 | 2 | 4 | 6 |
| 7 | Philippines | 0 | 2 | 3 | 5 |
| 7 | Vietnam | 0 | 2 | 3 | 5 |
| 9 | Japan | 0 | 1 | 2 | 3 |
| 10 | Indonesia | 0 | 1 | 1 | 2 |
| 11 | Lebanon | 0 | 1 | 0 | 1 |
| 12 | Kazakhstan | 0 | 0 | 1 | 1 |
| 12 | Qatar | 0 | 0 | 1 | 1 |
| 12 | Saudi Arabia | 0 | 0 | 1 | 1 |
| 12 | Thailand | 0 | 0 | 1 | 1 |
| 12 | Yemen | 0 | 0 | 1 | 1 |
| Totals (16 entries) | | 16 | 16 | 32 | 64 |
