= Luis Alberto García =

Venezuelan taekwondo practitioner

Luis García
Personal information
- Full name: Luis Alberto García
- Nationality: Venezuela
- Born: 9 September 1980 (age 46) Ciudad Bolívar, Venezuela
- Height: 1.80 m (5 ft 11 in)
- Weight: 68 kg (150 lb)

Sport
- Sport: Taekwondo
- Event: 68 kg
Medal record
Men's taekwondo
Representing Venezuela
Pan American Games
Silver medal – second place	1999 Winnipeg	58 kg

Luis Alberto García (born September 9, 1980 in Ciudad Bolívar) is a Venezuelan taekwondo practitioner, who competed in the men's featherweight category. He retrieved a silver medal in the 58-kg division at the 1999 Pan American Games in Winnipeg, Manitoba, Canada, and represented his nation Venezuela at the 2004 Summer Olympics.

Garcia emerged himself on Venezuela's sporting fame at the 1999 Pan American Games in Winnipeg, Manitoba, Canada, where he picked up a silver medal in the men's 58-kg division, losing the final to Mexico's Óscar Salazar.

At the 2004 Summer Olympics in Athens, Garcia qualified for the Venezuelan squad in the men's featherweight class (68 kg), by placing third and granting a berth from the World Olympic Qualifying Tournament in Paris, France. Garcia crashed out early in a narrow 5–6 defeat to Brazil's Diogo Silva during his opening match. With his Brazilian opponent losing the quarterfinals to Iranian fighter and eventual Olympic champion Hadi Saei, Garcia denied his chance to proceed into the repechage bracket for the Olympic bronze medal.
