= Claudio Nolano =

Italian taekwondo practitioner

Personal information
- Nationality: Italian
- Born: 22 September 1975 (age 49); Rome, Italy

Sport
- Sport: Taekwondo

Claudio Nolano (born 22 September 1975) is an Italian taekwondo practitioner. He competed in the men's 68 kg event at the 2000 Summer Olympics.
