= Carlo Massimino =

Australian taekwondo practitioner

Personal information
- Full name: Carlo Massimino
- Nationality: Australia
- Born: 14 March 1976 (age 50) Brisbane, Queensland, Australia
- Height: 1.76 m (5 ft 9 1/2 in)
- Weight: 67 kg (148 lb)

Sport
- Sport: Taekwondo
- Event: 68 kg
- Club: Hall's Taekwondo
- Coached by: Martin Hall
Medal record
Men's taekwondo
Representing Australia
Asian Championships
Bronze medal – third place	2002 Amman	67 kg

Carlo Massimino (born 14 May 1976 in Brisbane) is an Australian taekwondo practitioner, who competed in the men's featherweight category. He captured a bronze medal in the 67-kg division at the 2002 Asian Taekwondo Championships in Amman, Jordan, and represented his nation Australia in two editions of the Olympic Games (2000 and 2004). Before his sporting career ended in late 2004, Massimino trained full-time for Hall's Taekwondo Academy in Brisbane, under head coach and master Martin Hall.

Massimino made his official debut, as part of the home nation squad, at the 2000 Summer Olympics in Sydney, where he competed in the men's featherweight class (68 kg). He handily defeated Spain's Francisco Zas by a marginal judging decision in his opening match, before bowing out in a 1–1 draw to U.S. taekwondo jin and eventual Olympic champion Steven López. Spurred on by the noise of his Aussie fans, Massimino redeemed himself from a premature exit to edge past Italy's Claudio Nolano 9–7, but came to a dramatic halt with a narrow 5–6 defeat to Iran's Hadi Saei in the repechage round, relegating Massimino to fifth.

At the 2004 Summer Olympics in Athens, Massimino qualified for his second Aussie team in the men's featherweight class (68 kg), by placing second behind Iran's Hadi Saei and granting a berth from the Asian Olympic Qualifying Tournament in Bangkok, Thailand. Massimino opened his match with a more satisfying 7–2 victory over Tunisia's Mohamed Omrani in the prelims, before he was dangerously beaten by Guatemalan fighter and two-time Olympian Gabriel Sagastume in the quarterfinal match 4–5. With Sagastume losing the semifinal to Chinese Taipei's Huang Chih-hsiung, Massimino denied his opportunity to compete in the repechage rounds.

Shortly after his second Olympics, Massimino firmly made his decision to retire from competitive taekwondo, and focus instead on fulfilling his dream of opening up a taekwondo centre in honor of his name, which progressively became one of Australia's fastest growing sport academies.
