= Francisco Zas =

Spanish taekwondo practitioner (born 1972)

Personal information
- Nationality: Spanish
- Born: 19 February 1972 (age 54) La Coruna, Spain

Sport
- Sport: Taekwondo

Francisco Zas (born 19 February 1972) is a Spanish taekwondo practitioner. He competed in the men's 68 kg event at the 2000 Summer Olympics.
