= Jesper Roesen =

Danish taekwondo practitioner (born 1975)

Personal information
- Full name: Jesper Roesen
- Nationality: Denmark
- Born: 2 May 1975 (age 51) Copenhagen, Denmark
- Height: 1.81 m (5 ft 11 1/2 in)
- Weight: 68 kg (150 lb)

Sport
- Sport: Taekwondo
- Event: 68 kg
- Club: Hwarang Taekwondo Klub
- Coached by: Bjarne Johansen
Medal record
Men's taekwondo
Representing Denmark
World Championships
Silver medal – second place	1999 Edmonton	Featherweight (−67 kg)
Silver medal – second place	2001 Jeju City	Lightweight (−72 kg)
European Championships
Gold medal – first place	1996 Helsinki	−64 kg
Gold medal – first place	1998 Eindhoven	−67 kg
Gold medal – first place	2005 Riga	−72 kg

Jesper Roesen (born 2 May 1975) is a Danish retired taekwondo practitioner, who competed in the men's featherweight category. Considering one of Europe's top taekwondo players in his own division, Roesen held three European titles (1996, 1998, and 2005), obtained two silver medals at the World Championships (1999 and 2001), and represented his nation Denmark at the 2004 Summer Olympics. He now trains students at a school in Denmark. Throughout his sporting career, Roesen trained full-time for Hwarang Taekwondo Klub in Rødovre, under his personal coach and master Bjarne Johansen.

Roesen began his taekwondo training with Master Kytu's Hwarang Taekwondo Klub at fourteen years old. In 1996, Roesen's sporting career thrived with his first ever European title in Helsinki, Finland, and then continued to add one more in Eindhoven, Netherlands two years later. Roesen also permitted a chance to represent his nation Denmark at the World Taekwondo Championships, where he placed second behind South Korea's No Hyun-goo in 1999 and U.S. fighter Steven López in 2001.

At the 2004 Summer Olympics in Athens, Roesen qualified for the Danish squad in the men's featherweight class (68 kg), by registering his entry and placing third from the European Olympic Qualifying Tournament in Baku, Azerbaijan. Roesen got off to a flying start with a seamless 11–10 victory over Argentina's two-time Olympian Alejandro Hernando, before ending his Olympic debut by hopelessly losing the quarterfinal match 11–13 to South Korea's Song Myeong-seob.

Roesen won his third gold medal at the 2005 European Championships in Riga, Latvia, defeating Tommy Mollet in the final. The competition marked the end of his fifteen-year taekwondo career.
