= Lee Jung-ok =

South Korean volleyball player (born 1983)

Personal information
- Nationality: South Korean
- Born: 19 July 1983 (age 43)
- Height: 1.79 m (5 ft 10 in)
- Weight: 72 kg (159 lb)
- Spike: 280 cm (110 in)
- Block: 272 cm (107 in)

Volleyball information
- Number: 1

Career
Years	Teams
2004	(South Korea) LG Caltex Oil

National team
2004	South Korea South Korea

Lee Jung-ok (born 19 July 1983) is a South Korean female volleyball player. She was part of the South Korea women's national volleyball team.

She competed with the national team at the 2004 Summer Olympics in Athens, Greece. She played with LG Caltex Oil in 2004.

== Clubs ==
- (South Korea) LG Caltex Oil (2004)

== See also ==
- South Korea at the 2004 Summer Olympics
