= Stanislas Ogoudjobi =

Beninese taekwondo practitioner

Personal information
- Nationality: Beninese
- Born: 25 March 1977 (age 48)

Sport
- Sport: Taekwondo

Stanislas Ogoudjobi (born 25 March 1977) is a Beninese taekwondo practitioner. He competed in the men's 68 kg event at the 2000 Summer Olympics.
