= Olivier Bernasconi =

Monegasque taekwondo practitioner (born 1977)

Personal information
- Nationality: Monegasque
- Born: 14 April 1977 (age 49)

Sport
- Sport: Taekwondo

Olivier Bernasconi (born 14 April 1977) is a Monegasque taekwondo practitioner. He competed in the men's 68 kg event at the 2000 Summer Olympics.
