= Duncan Mahlangu =

South African taekwondo practitioner

Personal information
- Full name: Duncan Mahlangu
- Nationality: South Africa
- Born: 8 August 1983 (age 43) Pretoria, South Africa
- Height: 1.83 m (6 ft 0 in)
- Weight: 68 kg (150 lb)

Sport
- Sport: Taekwondo
- Event: 68 kg

Duncan Mahlangu (born August 8, 1983 in Pretoria) is a South African taekwondo practitioner, who competed in the men's featherweight category. He captured a silver medal in the 68-kg class at the 2003 World Olympic Qualification Tournament in Paris, France, and later represented his nation South Africa at the 2004 Summer Olympics.

Mahlangu qualified as a lone taekwondo fighter for the South African squad in the men's featherweight class (68 kg) at the 2004 Summer Olympics in Athens, by placing second behind South Korea's Lee Won-jae and granting a berth from the World Olympic Qualifying Tournament in Paris, France. He failed to move beyond the opening round in a 7–11 defeat to Guatemalan taekwondo fighter and two-time Olympian Gabriel Sagastume. With his opponent losing the semifinal to Chinese Taipei's Huang Chih-hsiung, Mahlangu denied his chance to compete for the Olympic bronze medal through the repechage rounds.
