= Pak Sun-mi =

South Korean volleyball player (born 1982)

Personal information
- Nationality: South Korean
- Born: 3 February 1982 (age 44)
- Height: 1.78 m (5 ft 10 in)
- Weight: 65 kg (143 lb)
- Spike: 275 cm (108 in)
- Block: 268 cm (106 in)

Volleyball information
- Number: 12

Career
Years	Teams
2004	(South Korea) Hyundai E&C

National team
2004	South Korea South Korea

- Pak Sun-mi
- Hangul: 박선미
- RR: Bak Seonmi
- MR: Pak Sŏnmi

Pak Sun-mi (born 3 February 1982) is a South Korean female volleyball player. She was part of the South Korea women's national volleyball team.

She competed with the national team at the 2004 Summer Olympics in Athens, Greece. She played with Hyundai E&C in 2004.

== Clubs ==
- (South Korea) Hyundai E&C (2004)

== See also ==
- South Korea at the 2004 Summer Olympics
