= Aslanbek Dzitiyev =

Russian taekwondo practitioner

Personal information
- Nationality: Russian
- Born: 27 August 1982 (age 42); Vladikavkaz, North Ossetia-Alania, Russia

Sport
- Sport: Taekwondo

Aslanbek Dzitiyev (born 27 August 1982) is a Russian taekwondo practitioner. He competed in the men's 68 kg event at the 2000 Summer Olympics.
