= Kim Hye-mi =

South Korean taekwondo practitioner

Personal information
- Nationality: South Korean
- Born: 16 April 1983 (age 43)

Sport
- Sport: Taekwondo
Medal record
Representing South Korea
Women's taekwondo
World Championships
Gold medal – first place	2001 Jeju	Welterweight
Asian Championships
Gold medal – first place	2002 Amman	-67 kg

Kim Hye-mi (born 16 April 1983) is a South Korean taekwondo practitioner.

She won a gold medal in welterweight at the 2001 World Taekwondo Championships, and a gold medal at the 2002 Asian Taekwondo Championships.
