= Diogo Silva (taekwondo) =

Brazilian taekwondo practitioner

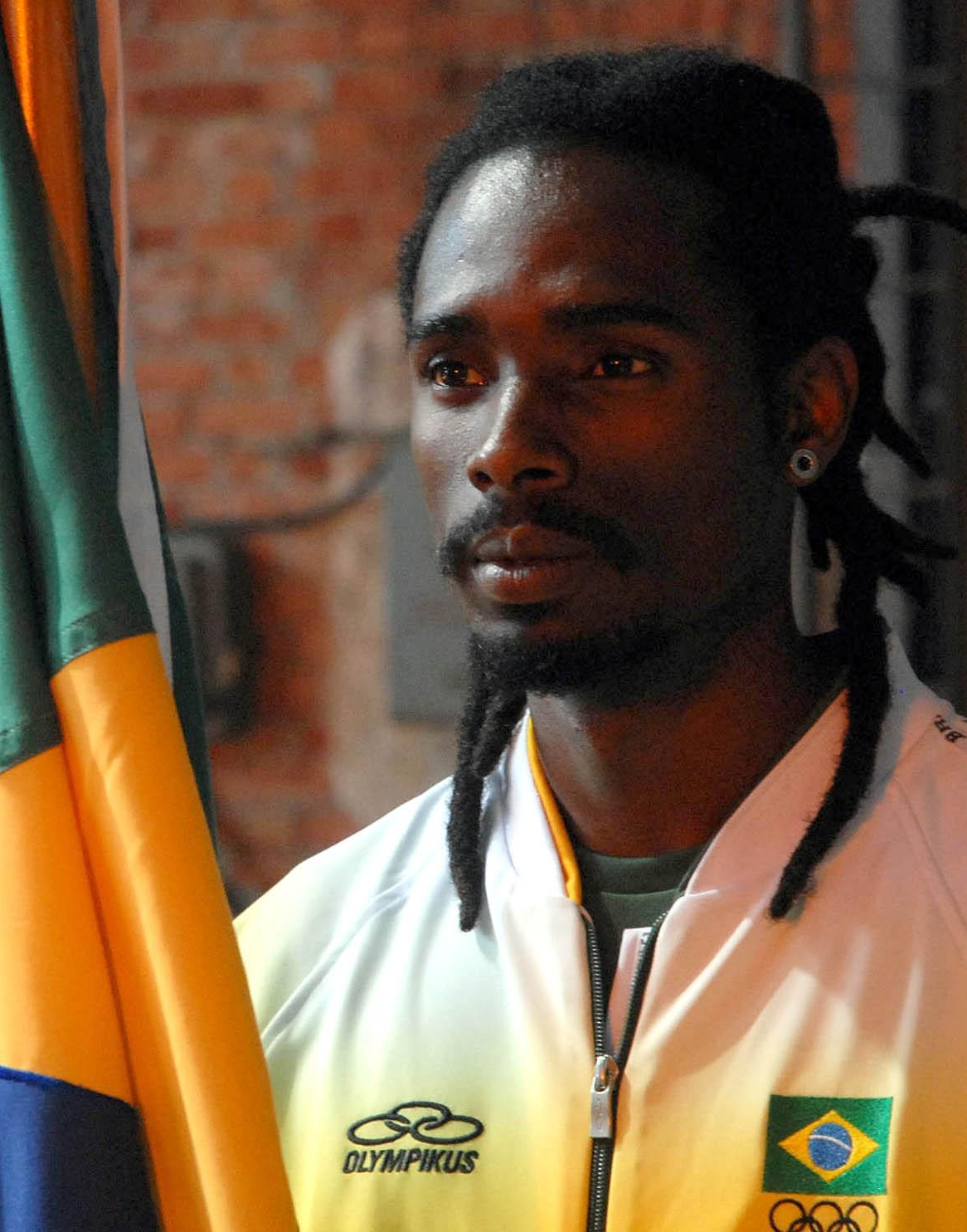
- Silva in 2007

Personal information
- Born: 7 March 1982 (age 44) São Sebastião, São Paulo, Brazil
Medal record
Men's taekwondo
Representing Brazil
Pan American Games
Gold medal – first place	2007 Rio de Janeiro	– 68 kg
Bronze medal – third place	2003 Santo Domingo	– 68 kg
South American Games
Gold medal – first place	Rio 2002	– 67 kg
Gold medal – first place	Buenos Aires 2006	– 67 kg
Silver medal – second place	Medellin 2010	– 68 kg
Universiade
Gold medal – first place	Belgrado 2009	– 67 kg
World Qualification Tournament for 2012 Olympic Games
Bronze medal – third place	Baku 2011	– 68 kg
Military World Games
Gold medal – first place	Rio 2011	– 68 kg
Open championships
Gold medal – first place	Belgica Open 2006	– 67 kg
Gold medal – first place	Korea Open 2006	– 67 kg
Silver medal – second place	Germany Open 2007	– 67 kg
Silver medal – second place	US Open 2012	– 68 kg
Bronze medal – third place	Germany Open 2006	– 67 kg
Bronze medal – third place	Germany Open 2014	– 68 kg
Bronze medal – third place	US Open 2011	– 68 kg
Bronze medal – third place	US Open 2013	– 68 kg

Diogo André Silvestre da Silva (born March 7, 1982) is a Brazilian taekwondo athlete. He finished in the fourth place in the men's 68-kilogram category in taekwondo at the 2004 Summer Olympics on August 27. At the 2012 Summer Olympics he finished in 5th in the same weight class. Silva failed to qualify for the 2008 Summer Olympics.

Silva was raised in Londrina, Paraná, and entered sports following a suggestion of his mother, who wanted him to enter an academy to stop fighting in the street. She wanted Silva to take up judo, but he entered taekwondo because he wanted to fight "like the actors in fighting movies". He cited as influences Jet Li and Jackie Chan, the latter being star of his favorite movies, Rumble in the Bronx and Rush Hour. Diogo stood out for Fighting the lack of incentive and the taekwondo For the Black Movement | black cause.

Silva frequently protests against the lack of support for his sport. He has alleged that he receives only $600 reais "which come late, only between three and three months" from the taekwondo confederation, and having to spend R$5000 of his own money to train and compete in Europe. He is also an accomplished tree climber, surfer, parachutist and bunjee-jumper.

== Sporting career ==
In the 2004 Olympics, Diogo defeated the Venezuelan Luis Alberto García with a 6 a 5 and in the second round lost to the Iranian Hadi Saei with 8 a 6 in pay-off won the Italian Carlo Molfetta and the Guatemalan Gabriel Sagastume, in the bronze dispute Diogo lost to the South-Korean Song Myeong-Seob with a 12 a 7 score, staying in fourth place.

== Achievements ==
Diogo Silva won two Pan American Games medals, bronze in Santo Domingo 2003 Gold in Rio de Janeiro 2007. He also received the bronze in the 1998 World Youth Taekwondo Championship, and gold in two South American Games.

== 2004 Summer Olympics ==
Diogo competed at the Olympics for the first time in 2004, achieving a fourth-place finish. He was defeated in the quarterfinals by Iranian Hadi Saei Bonehkohal. At the repechage, Silva defeated Italian Carlo Molfetta and Gabriel Sagastume of Guatemala, but was beaten by South Korean Song Myeong-Seob in the bronze medal match. At the Bronze match, Silva brought with him a Black Panthers glove, because he wanted to protest against the lack of support for his sport in Brazil.

== 2012 Summer Olympics ==
Silva competed in the 2012 Olympic Games; after losing to Mohammad Bagheri Motamed in the semi-finals, Silva was put into the Bronze medal match. He actually tied up the score in the third round, but his opponent Terrence Jennings from the United States beat him with a kick to the head which landed in a victory for Jennings 8-5. Silva ended in fifth place at the Olympic Games.
