= Gabriel Sagastume =

Guatemalan Olympic taekwondo practitioner

Personal information
- Full name: José Gabriel Sagastume Ríos
- Nationality: Guatemala
- Born: 5 January 1982 (age 44) Guatemala City, Guatemala
- Height: 1.74 m (5 ft 8 1/2 in)
- Weight: 68 kg (150 lb)

Sport
- Sport: Taekwondo
- Event: 68 kg

José Gabriel Sagastume Ríos (born January 5, 1982, in Guatemala City) is a Guatemalan taekwondo practitioner, who competed in the men's featherweight category. He picked up a gold medal in Panam taekwondo championships in Oranjsted, Aruba in 2000, and a bronze medal from the 2004 Pan American Championships in Santo Domingo, Dominican Republic. He was a two-time Iberoamerican champion (Barcelona 2003, and Querétaro 2005). He ended in 5th place in the 2005 world taekwondo championships in Madrid, Spain, and represented his nation Guatemala in two editions of the Olympic Games (2000 and 2004, finishing in 5th place).

Sagastume made his official debut, as an 18-year-old teen, at the 2000 Summer Olympics in Sydney, where he lost his opening match to Filipino taekwondo jin Roberto Cruz in the men's flyweight class (58 kg).

At the 2004 Summer Olympics in Athens, Sagastume qualified for the Guatemalan squad in the men's featherweight class (68 kg), by placing third and granting a berth from the Pan American Olympic Qualifying Tournament in Querétaro, Mexico. Sagastume improved his previous Olympic feat by dispatching South Africa's Duncan Mahlangu (11–7) in the prelims and Australia's Carlo Massimino (5–4) in the quarterfinals, before falling in a defeat to Chinese Taipei's Huang Chih-hsiung, who landed him a counterblow by a late surge to produce a 7–5 record. In the repechage rounds, Sagastume gave himself a chance to campaign for his nation's first Olympic medal, but he was cautiously beaten by Brazil's Diogo Silva with a score of 10–12.

Sagastume works for the sports and leisure council in Guatemala, is an international TKD referee, and works on an IOC outreach program that helps athletes to get their lives planified after retirement.
