= Aziz Acharki =

German taekwondo practitioner

Personal information
- Nationality: German
- Born: 27 March 1972 (age 53) Nador, Morocco
- Height: 1.80 m (5 ft 11 in)
- Weight: 68 kg (150 lb)

Sport
- Sport: Taekwondo

Aziz Acharki (born 27 March 1972) is a Moroccan-born German taekwondo practitioner. He won the men's lightweight World Championship in 1995.

He competed in the 2000 Summer Olympics. He has won 70 of his 92 registered fights.
