= Song Myeong-seob =

South Korean taekwondo practitioner

Medal record

Men's taekwondo

Representing South Korea

Olympic Games
Bronze medal – third place	2004 Athens	68 kg

World Championships
Silver medal – second place	2005 Madrid	Featherweight
Bronze medal – third place	2007 Beijing	Featherweight

Asian Games
Gold medal – first place	2006 Doha	Featherweight

- Song Myeong-seob
- Hangul: 송명섭
- Hanja: 宋明燮
- RR: Song Myeongseop
- MR: Song Myŏngsŏp

Song Myeong-Seob (born June 29, 1984) is a South Korean Taekwondo athletic and a member of Kyung Hee University's Taekwondo team. He measures 1,77 m in height and 69 kg in weight.

Song was on the South Korean Taekwondo team at the 2004 Summer Olympic Games held in Athens, Greece. He won the Bronze medal after losing to eventual gold medalist Hadi Saei Bonehkohal. Song defeated Brazil's Diogo Silva for the Bronze medal in the Repechage ladder.

== See also ==
- List of South Korean athletes
- Sport in South Korea
