= Niyamaddin Pashayev =

Azerbaijani taekwondo practitioner

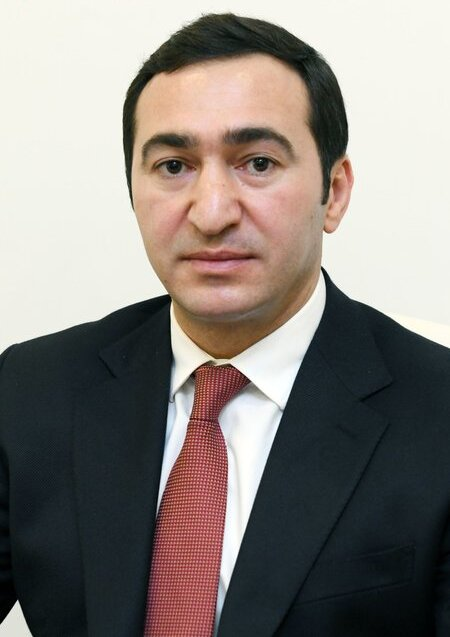
Medal record
Men's taekwondo
Representing Azerbaijan
World Championships
Gold medal – first place	2001 Jeju	Featherweight
Bronze medal – third place	2003 Partenkirchen	Featherweight
European Championships
Bronze medal – third place	2000 Patras	Bantamweight
Gold medal – first place	2004 Lillehammer	Featherweight
Gold medal – first place	2005 Riga	Featherweight

Niyamaddin Pashayev (Azerbaijani: Niyaməddin Paşayev, born May 1, 1980, in Qubadlı, Azerbaijani SSR) is an Azerbaijani taekwondo athlete. He has won gold medals in both the European and World Taekwondo Championships.
