= Sin Joon-sik =

South Korean taekwondo practitioner

Medal record

Representing South Korea

Men's taekwondo

Olympic Games
Silver medal – second place	2000 Sydney	68 kg

Asian Championships
Gold medal – first place	2002 Amman	Lightweight

Sin Joon-Sik (born January 13, 1980) is a South Korean taekwondo practitioner and Olympic medalist. He competed at the 2000 Summer Olympics in Sydney, where he received a silver medal in the lightweight competition.
