= Hadi Saei =

Iranian taekwondo practitioner

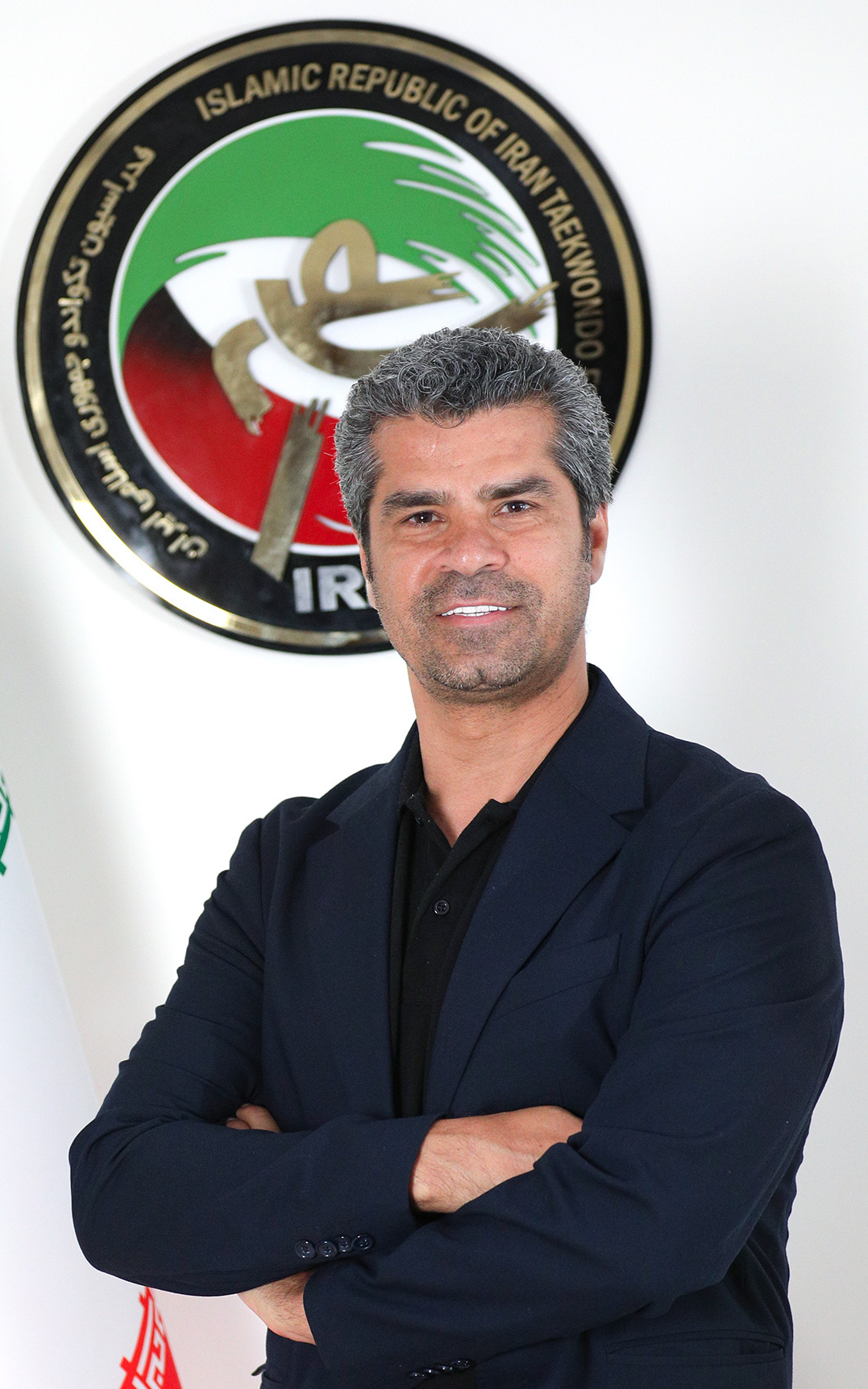
- Saei in 2024

Member of City Council of Tehran
- In office 29 April 2007 – 22 August 2017

Personal details
- Born: Hadi Saei Beneh Kohol هادی ساعی بنه‌کهل; June 10, 1976 (age 50) Tehran, Iran
- Party: Independent
- Other political affiliations: Reformists Coalition (2006)
- Education: Islamic Azad University
- Sports career
- Country: Iran
- Sport: Taekwondo
Medal record
Olympic Games
Gold medal – first place	2004 Athens	68 kg
Gold medal – first place	2008 Beijing	80 kg
Bronze medal – third place	2000 Sydney	68 kg
World Championships
Gold medal – first place	1999 Edmonton	72 kg
Gold medal – first place	2005 Madrid	72 kg
Silver medal – second place	2003 Garmisch-Partenkirchen	72 kg
Bronze medal – third place	2007 Beijing	72 kg
Asian Games
Gold medal – first place	2002 Busan	72 kg
Bronze medal – third place	2006 Doha	72 kg
Asian Championships
Gold medal – first place	2006 Bangkok	72 kg
Silver medal – second place	2002 Amman	72 kg
West Asian Games
Gold medal – first place	1997 Tehran	70 kg

Hadi Saei (Persian: هادی ساعی; born June 10, 1976) is an Iranian councilor and former taekwondo athlete who became the most successful Iranian athlete in Olympic history and the most titled champion in the sport by winning 9 world class titles (two olympic titles in 2004 and 2008, two world championships titles, four world cup titles and one world olympic qualification tournament). Earlier in his career and in the 2000 Summer Olympics in Sydney, Saei had won the bronze medal. He was elected as member of City Council of Tehran in 2006 local elections and was reelected in 2013 but lost the 2017 election. He is one of the three olympians with the most medals in the sport of taekwondo. He was the President of Islamic Republic of Iran Taekwondo Federation from January 2022 to January 2026.

== Career ==
He has been practicing taekwondo since he was six years old. Having previously competed in Lightweight (67–72 kg), he is the 1999 World Champion and 2003 World Championship silver medalist. When the Iranian town of Bam was devastated in the 2003 earthquake, Saei put his medals up for auction to raise money for the victims.

He has been World Champion in the World Taekwondo Championships two times. Currently, he is a senior at the Iran Physical Education University.

Saei officially ended his career as a taekwondo athlete on November 8, 2008 (18 Aban 1387).

=== 2008 Summer Olympics ===
In the first match against the Nepalese Deepak Bista he fractured his right hand. He did not indicate his injury throughout the entire competition despite enormous pain until he won the final against Mauro Sarmiento. Immediately after winning the Gold medal his hand was put in a plaster cast.

By winning his gold medal, Saei ensured that Iran was leaving Beijing with a better result than their poor showing at the 1948 Summer Olympics in London, where they received only one bronze medal. For full results, see Iran at the Olympics.

== Titles ==
- 1995 World Military Taekwondo Championships SILVER
- 1996 World Military Taekwondo Championships BRONZE
- 1998 World Taekwondo Cup GOLD
- 1999 World Taekwondo Championships GOLD
- 2000 World Taekwondo Cup GOLD
- 2000 Sydney Olympic Games BRONZE
- 2001 World Taekwondo Cup GOLD
- 2002 Asian Taekwondo Championships SILVER
- 2002 World Taekwondo Cup GOLD
- 2002 Busan Asian Games GOLD
- 2003 World Taekwondo Championships SILVER
- 2004 Asian Olympic Qualification Tournament GOLD
- 2004 Athens Olympic Games GOLD
- 2005 World Taekwondo Championship GOLD
- 2006 Asian Taekwondo Championships GOLD
- 2006 Doha Asian Games BRONZE
- 2007 World Taekwondo Championship BRONZE
- 2008 Asian Olympic Qualification Tournament GOLD
- 2008 Beijing Olympic Games GOLD

== In popular culture ==
Hadi Saei starred in the TV series Amin directed by Manuchehr Hadi in 2015.

== Personal life ==
He has suffered great personal tragedy having lost his brother and father in the same year, in addition to his younger brother who succumbed to cancer the following year. Saei is originally Iranian Azerbaijani from the East Azerbaijan Province and Bostanabad city.

== See also ==
- 2006 Iranian City and Village Councils elections

Awards
Preceded by Hossein Rezazadeh	Iran Sportsperson of the year 2004	Succeeded by Hossein Rezazadeh
