= 2011 World Taekwondo Championships – Women's welterweight =

Taekwondo competition

Women's welterweight at the 2011 World Championships
- Venue: Gyeongju Indoor Stadium
- Dates: 2–3 May 2011
- Competitors: 45 from 45 nations

Medalists
gold medal	Sarah Stevenson	Great Britain
silver medal	Guo Yunfei	China
bronze medal	Hwang Kyung-seon	South Korea
bronze medal	Helena Fromm	Germany

The women's welterweight is a competition featured at the 2011 World Taekwondo Championships, and was held at the Gyeongju Gymnasium in Gyeongju, South Korea on May 2 and May 3. Welterweights were limited to a maximum of 67 kilograms in body mass.

== Results ==
Legend

- DQ — Won by disqualification

=== Finals ===
Semifinals		Final
Hwang Kyung-seon (KOR)	5
Sarah Stevenson (GBR)	8	Sarah Stevenson (GBR)	3
Helena Fromm (GER)	2	Guo Yunfei (CHN)	3
Guo Yunfei (CHN)	3

=== Top half ===
==== Section 1 ====
Round of 64
~~Andrea St. Bernard (GRN)~~	DQ
~~Emilia Ngouabi (CGO)~~	DQ
Dhunyanun Premwaew (THA)	DQ
~~Shraboni Biswas (BAN)~~
Chu Hoàng Diệu Linh (VIE)	DQ
~~Patricia Costa (STP)~~

Round of 32
Hwang Kyung-seon (KOR)
Bye
Marjolijn Abbink (NED)	DQ
~~Diana Castiblanco (COL)~~
Gulnafis Aitmukhambetova (KAZ)	5
Dhunyanun Premwaew (THA)	4
Chu Hoàng Diệu Linh (VIE)	1
Hakima El-Meslahy (MAR)	6

Round of 16
Hwang Kyung-seon (KOR)	8
Marjolijn Abbink (NED)	1
Gulnafis Aitmukhambetova (KAZ)	8
Hakima El-Meslahy (MAR)	10

Quarterfinals
Hwang Kyung-seon (KOR)	2
Hakima El-Meslahy (MAR)	0

==== Section 2 ====
Round of 64
Viktoryia Belanouskaya (BLR)	9
Stephanie Ollive (FRA)	2
~~Yosmar Díaz (VEN)~~
Sara Magnúsdóttir (ISL)	DQ
Raquel Menéndez (ESP)	DQ
~~Pauline Oyugi (KEN)~~
Débora Nunes (BRA)	4
Natalya Mamatova (UZB)	8

Round of 32
Seham El-Sawalhy (EGY)	2
Viktoryia Belanouskaya (BLR)	5
Sara Magnúsdóttir (ISL)	4
Chloe Iriyadi (AUS)	8
Emina Ortaš (BIH)	0
Raquel Menéndez (ESP)	2
Natalya Mamatova (UZB)	0
Sarah Stevenson (GBR)	8

Round of 16
Viktoryia Belanouskaya (BLR)	17
Chloe Iriyadi (AUS)	7
Raquel Menéndez (ESP)	0
Sarah Stevenson (GBR)	12

Quarterfinals
Viktoryia Belanouskaya (BLR)	1
Sarah Stevenson (GBR)	12

=== Bottom half ===
==== Section 3 ====
Round of 64
Jacqueline Galloway (MEX)	6
Verafitria Anggraeni (INA)	2
Katarzyna Wieczorek (POL)	12
Nikolina Kursar (NOR)	2
Aleksandra Potapova (RUS)	7
Simona Hradilová (CZE)	2

Round of 32
Helena Fromm (GER)	10
Jacqueline Galloway (MEX)	4
~~Keyla Ávila (HON)~~	DQ
~~Kim Won-kyung (AZE)~~	DQ
Asunción Ocasio (PUR)	2
Katarzyna Wieczorek (POL)	3
Aleksandra Potapova (RUS)	1
Parisa Farshidi (IRI)	0

Round of 16
Helena Fromm (GER)
Bye
Katarzyna Wieczorek (POL)	7
Aleksandra Potapova (RUS)	4

Quarterfinals
Helena Fromm (GER)	6
Katarzyna Wieczorek (POL)	0

==== Section 4 ====
Round of 64
Mbassa Sakho (SEN)	3
Burcu Arıpişirici (TUR)	18
Elisavet Mystakidou (GRE)	DQ
~~Hayley Schofield (NZL)~~
Paige McPherson (USA)	4
Franka Anić (SLO)	3

Round of 32
Guo Yunfei (CHN)	10
Burcu Arıpişirici (TUR)	7
Elisavet Mystakidou (GRE)	1
Petra Matijašević (CRO)	8
Sun Ai-chi (TPE)	9
Patricia Figueroa (CHI)	3
Paige McPherson (USA)	8
Melissa Pagnotta (CAN)	5

Round of 16
Guo Yunfei (CHN)	9
Petra Matijašević (CRO)	5
Sun Ai-chi (TPE)	0
Paige McPherson (USA)	3

Quarterfinals
Guo Yunfei (CHN)	2
Paige McPherson (USA)	1
