= 2011 World Taekwondo Olympic Qualification Tournament – Women's 67 kg =

Taekwondo competition

World Qualification Tournament
Men	Women
58 kg	49 kg
68 kg	57 kg
80 kg	67 kg
+80 kg	+67 kg

The Women's 67 kg is a competition featured at the 2011 World Taekwondo Olympic Qualification Tournament, and was held at the Sarhadchi Olympic Center in Baku, Azerbaijan on June 30. The first three ranked athletes qualify their NOCs a place each at the 2012 Olympic Games.

== Results ==
Legend

- DQ — Won by disqualification
- RSC — Won by referee stop contest

=== Finals ===
Semifinals
Farida Azizova (AZE)	4
Elin Johansson (SWE)	0
Seham El-Sawalhy (EGY)	1
Kim Mi-kyung (KOR)	7

Final
Farida Azizova (AZE)	5
Kim Mi-kyung (KOR)	6
3rd place
Elin Johansson (SWE)	11
Seham El-Sawalhy (EGY)	2

=== Top half ===
==== Section 1 ====
Round of 64
~~Viktorija Spasovska (MKD)~~
Elisavet Mystakidou (GRE)	DQ

Round of 32
Karine Sergerie (CAN)	5
Elisavet Mystakidou (GRE)	0
Hayley Schofield (NZL)	4
Viktoryia Belanouskaya (BLR)	19
Farida Azizova (AZE)	5
Franka Anić (SLO)	0
Simona Hradilová (CZE)
Paige McPherson (USA)	RSC

Round of 16
Karine Sergerie (CAN)	10
Viktoryia Belanouskaya (BLR)	4
Farida Azizova (AZE)	2
Paige McPherson (USA)	0

Quarterfinals
Karine Sergerie (CAN)	1
Farida Azizova (AZE)	2

==== Section 2 ====
Round of 64
~~Keyla Ávila (HON)~~
Chu Hoàng Diệu Linh (VIE)	DQ

Round of 32
Raheleh Asemani (IRI)	6
Timothea Diola (CYP)	1
Nina Kläy (SUI)	7
Nikolina Kursar (NOR)	5
Elin Johansson (SWE)	14
Tahra Siad (SUD)	1
Chu Hoàng Diệu Linh (VIE)	2
Gulnafis Aitmukhambetova (KAZ)	9

Round of 16
Raheleh Asemani (IRI)	4
Nina Kläy (SUI)	8
Elin Johansson (SWE)	13
Gulnafis Aitmukhambetova (KAZ)	8

Quarterfinals
Nina Kläy (SUI)	2
Elin Johansson (SWE)	3

=== Bottom half ===
==== Section 3 ====
Round of 64
Carmen Marton (AUS)	3
Adanys Cordero (VEN)	1

Round of 32
Seham El-Sawalhy (EGY)	6
Carmen Marton (AUS)	5
Andrea St. Bernard (GRN)	2
Raphaella Pereira (BRA)	1
Katarzyna Wieczorek (POL)	6
Catalina Fierro (CHI)	1
Mariama Dalanda Barry (GUI)	0
Asunción Ocasio (PUR)	1

Round of 16
Seham El-Sawalhy (EGY)	7
Andrea St. Bernard (GRN)	5
Katarzyna Wieczorek (POL)	RSC
Asunción Ocasio (PUR)

Quarterfinals
Seham El-Sawalhy (EGY)	9
Katarzyna Wieczorek (POL)	3

==== Section 4 ====
Round of 64
~~Maitha Al-Maktoum (UAE)~~
Saina Savage (FIN)	DQ

Round of 32
Kim Mi-kyung (KOR)	12
Dahroon Mahmood (IRQ)	0
~~Gladys Mwaniki (KEN)~~
Joyce van Baaren (NED)	DQ
Urgence Mouegha (GAB)	0
Iulia Latus (MDA)	1
Saina Savage (FIN)	3
Helena Fromm (GER)	12

Round of 16
Kim Mi-kyung (KOR)	7
Joyce van Baaren (NED)	1
Iulia Latus (MDA)
Helena Fromm (GER)	RSC

Quarterfinals
Kim Mi-kyung (KOR)	10
Helena Fromm (GER)	9
