= Puerto Rico at the 2008 Summer Olympics =

- IOC code: PUR
- NOC: Puerto Rico Olympic Committee
- Website: www.copur.pr (in Spanish)

in Beijing
- Competitors: 22 in 8 sports
- Flag bearer: McWilliams Arroyo
- Medals: Gold 0 Silver 0 Bronze 0 Total 0

Summer Olympics appearances (overview)
- 1948; 1952; 1956; 1960; 1964; 1968; 1972; 1976; 1980; 1984; 1988; 1992; 1996; 2000; 2004; 2008; 2012; 2016; 2020; 2024; 2028

Puerto Rico competed in the 2008 Summer Olympics which was held in Beijing, People's Republic of China from August 8 to August 24, 2008. The American territory with a population of four million people qualified 22 athletes in eight different sports. The appearance of the Puerto Rican delegation at the Beijing Olympics marked the commonwealth's sixteenth consecutive appearance at the Summer Olympics, and its twenty-second appearance at any Olympic Games, since its debut at the 1948 Summer Olympics in London, England. Of its competitors participating in events that involve progression by heats, six athletes advanced at least one round in their events, and two advanced at least two rounds, with Asunción Ocasio almost medaling bronze in taekwondo. However, there were no Puerto Rican medalists at the Beijing Olympics. McWilliams Arroyo, a boxer, bore Puerto Rico's flag at the ceremonies.

== Background ==
Puerto Rico is a large island on the northern rim of the Caribbean that is home to approximately 4 million people. It lies due east of the Dominican Republic and to the west of the United States Virgin Islands. Puerto Rico was first colonized by the Spanish, but was ceded to the United States in the wake of the Spanish–American War in 1898. Puerto Ricans were granted American citizenship in 1917, although it remained apart from the United States and has a constitution that provides for self-government. 41 years after Puerto Ricans became American citizens, Puerto Rico sent its first delegation to the Olympics at the 1948 Summer Olympics in London, England. The American commonwealth has sent a delegation to all sixteen Summer Olympics between then and the 2008 Beijing Olympics in addition to six Winter Olympic Games.

Between its 1948 debut and its arrival at the Beijing Olympics, Puerto Rican athletes had won six medals (one silver and five bronze). The last medal earned by a Puerto Rican was a bronze medal by Daniel Santos at the 1996 Summer Olympics in Atlanta. No medals were won by Puerto Ricans at Beijing. During the course of the 2008 Olympics, 22 athletes represented Puerto Rico—17 men and five women—in eight sports (track and field, boxing, artistic gymnastics, judo, shooting, swimming, taekwondo, and weightlifting). The size of the delegation was 21 athletes smaller than the Puerto Rican delegation that arrived at the 2004 Summer Olympics in Athens, and 58 athletes smaller than Puerto Rico's largest Olympic team, which included 80 athletes participating in the 1976 Summer Olympics in Montréal, Canada. The oldest member of the Beijing delegation was Lucas Bennazar, a sharpshooter, who was 39 years old at the time; boxer Jonathan González, in contrast, was the youngest at 19 years old. Boxer McWilliams Arroyo was the nation's flag bearer at the ceremonies.

== Athletics ==
=== Men's team ===
==== Men's 400 meters ====
Félix Martínez participated in the Beijing Olympics in the men's 400 meters dash on behalf of Puerto Rico. Martínez competed at Beijing while he was 23 years old. He had not previously competed at any Olympic Games. During the August 17 qualification round, Martínez participated in the sixth heat, which included eight athletes. At the end of the event, Martínez placed seventh after achieving a time of 46.46 seconds. He ranked ahead of Poland's Daniel Dabrowski (47.83 seconds) and behind Grenada's Joel Phillips (46.30 seconds), while Great Britain's Andrew Steele (44.94 seconds) and Trinidad and Tobago's Renny Quow (45.13 seconds) lead Martínez's heat. Of the 55 finishing athletes, Martínez ranked 44th. He did not advance to later rounds.

==== Men's 1,500 meters ====
David Freeman competed for Puerto Rico at the Beijing Olympics, participating in the men's 1,500 meters race. He was 26 at the time of his participation in Beijing, which marked the first time he competed in any Olympic event. During the August 15 qualification round, Freeman was placed in the third heat versus 12 other athletes. He finished the event in 3:39.70, placing tenth. Nicholar Kemboi of Kenya placed behind Freeman (3:41.56), while Estonia's Tildrek Nurme placed ahead of him (3:38.59). The Puerto Rican runner's heat was led by South African athlete Juan van Deventer (3:36.32) and Spain's Arturo Casado (3:36.42). Overall, David Freeman ranked 25 out of the 48 finishing athletes. He did not advance to later rounds.

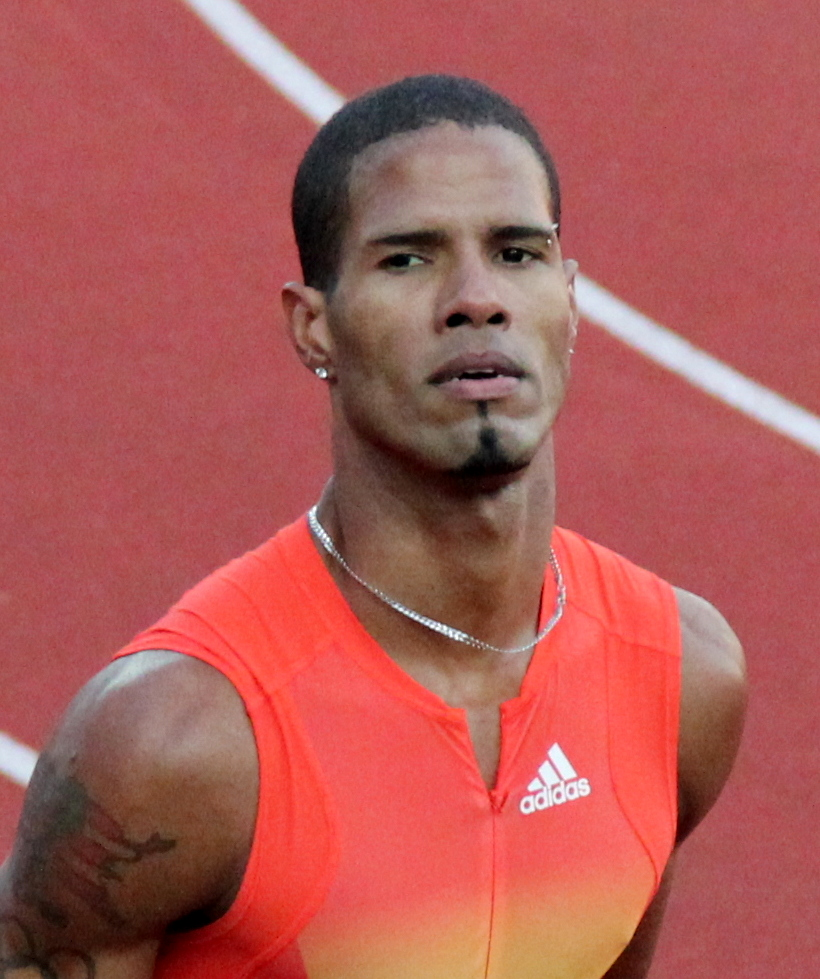
Javier Culson, the only member of the Puerto Rican male track and field team who advanced past the first round of his event

==== Men's 110 meters hurdles ====
Héctor Cotto Gonzalez participated for Puerto Rico in the men's 110 meters hurdles race, the only Puerto Rican participating in the event. Cotto was born in Fajardo, a city on Puerto Rico's far northeastern coast, and participated in the Olympics for the first time in Beijing at age 23. Cotto participated in the August 17 quarterfinals in the third heat, ranking sixth out of the heat's eight athletes after achieving a time of 13.72 seconds. He defeated Haiti's Dudley Dorival (13.78 seconds), but fell behind the Cayman Islands' Ronald Forbes (13.59 seconds) in a heat that was led by Colombia's Paulo Villar (13.37 seconds) and Barbados' Ryan Brathwaite (13.38 seconds). Of the 40 athletes who finished the event, Cotto ranked 28th. He progressed to the next round.

During the August 19 quarterfinals, Héctor Cotto Gonzalez participated in the first heat. He finished the event in 13.73 seconds, placing last in a heat of eight athletes. He fell behind Russian hurdler Igor Peremota (13.70 seconds) and Trinidad and Tobago's Mikel Thomas (13.62 seconds) in a heat that was led by the United States' David Payne (13.24 seconds) and the Czech Republic's Petr Svoboda (13.41 seconds). 30 of the athletes who progressed to the quarterfinal round completed their races; of these, Cotto ranked 27th. He did not advance to later rounds.

==== Men's 400 meters hurdles ====
Javier Culson Rodríguez (or Javier Culson Perez) participated in the Beijing Olympics on the behalf of the Puerto Rican track team, participating in the men's 400 meters hurdles. Culson was 24 at the time of his participation in the Beijing Olympics. He had not previously competed in any Olympic Games. During the August 15 qualification heat, Culson participated in the third heat, which was composed of six athletes. The Puerto Rican runner ranked fourth of the six athletes, finishing the race in 49.60 seconds. He ranked ahead of China's Meng Yan (49.73 seconds) and behind Poland's Marek Plawgo (49.60 seconds) in a heat that was led by Jamaica's Markino Buckley (48.65 seconds) and South Africa's LJ van Zyl (48.86 seconds). Of the 25 finishing athletes, Culson ranked 15th. He progressed to the semifinal round.

Puerto Rico's sole representative in the event participated in the first heat during the August 16 semifinal round, where he faced seven other athletes. Culson finished the race in 49.85 seconds, ranking last. South Africa's Pieter de Villiers ranked ahead of him in seventh place (49.44 seconds), as did Russia's Alexander Derevyagin, who ranked in sixth place (49.23 seconds). Culson's heat was led by American hurdlers Angelo Taylor (47.94 seconds) and Bershawn Jackson (48.02 seconds). Of the 16 semifinalists, Javier Culson ranked 14th. He did not advance to later rounds.

=== Women's team ===
==== Women's 200 meters ====
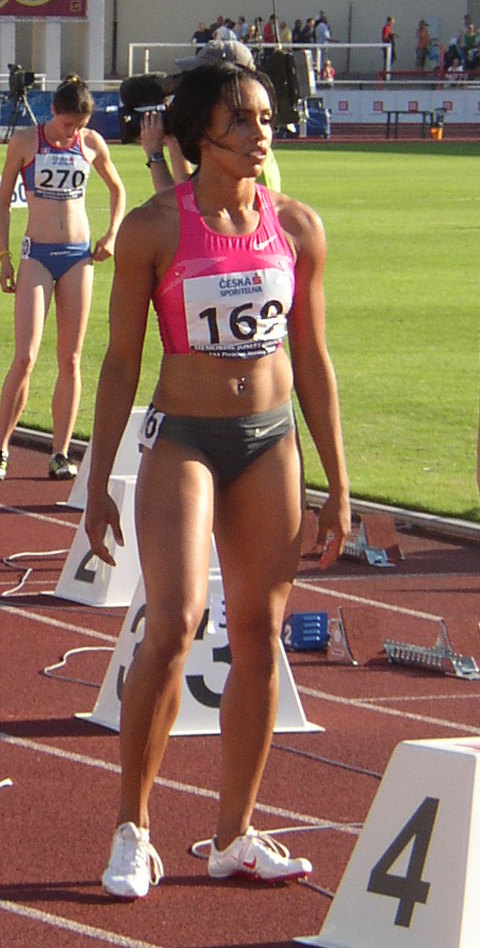
Carol Rodríguez, the only female track athlete who represented Puerto Rico in Beijing

Carol Ann Rodríguez Taylor competed for Puerto Rico at the 2008 Beijing Olympics in the women's 200 meters dash. She was the sole female Puerto Rican representative participating in track and field during that year. Born in Pomona, a northerly suburb of Los Angeles, Rodríguez attended the University of Southern California. She attended the Beijing Olympics at age 22, and had not previously attended any Olympic Games as a competitor. During the August 18 qualification round, Rodríguez competed in the second heat against seven other athletes, achieving a time of 24.07 seconds. Of those seven, six finished the event. Rodríguez ranked seventh in the heat behind Mariely Sanchez Hichez of the Dominican Republic (24.05 seconds) and Bulgaria's Ivet Lalova (23.13 seconds). She placed ahead only of Belgium's Kim Gevaert, who did not participate in the race. The leaders of Rodríguez's heat included first place finalist Muna Lee of the United States (22.71 seconds) and French second place finalist Muriel Hurtis-Houari (22.72 seconds). Of the 46 athletes who finished the race, Rodríguez tied Benin's Fabienne Fereaz for 40th place. She did not advance to later rounds.

==== Women's 400 meters ====
During her debut at the Beijing Olympics, Carol Rodríguez participated in the women's 400 meters race alongside her entry into the women's 200 meters dash. She was placed in the third heat during the August 16 qualification round, which included seven athletes in total. Rodríguez completed the event in 53.08 seconds, defeating Haiti's Ginou Etienne (53.84 seconds) but falling behind Barbara Petráhn of Hungary (53.06 seconds). The leaders of Rodríguez's heat included Russia's Anastasia Kapachinskaya in first place (51.32 seconds) and Mary Wineberg of the United States in second place (51.46 seconds). Of the 50 athletes competing in the event, the Puerto Rican sprinter placed 36th. She did not advance to later rounds.

=== Summary ===
Key

- Note–Ranks given for track events are within the athlete's heat only
- Q = Qualified for the next round
- q = Qualified for the next round as a fastest loser or, in field events, by position without achieving the qualifying target
- NR = National record
- N/A = Round not applicable for the event
- Bye = Athlete not required to compete in round

Men

Athlete	Event	Heat		Quarterfinal		Semifinal		Final	
Athlete	Event	Result	Rank	Result	Rank	Result	Rank	Result	Rank
Héctor Cotto	110 m hurdles	13.72	6 q	13.73	8	Did not advance			
Javier Culson	400 m hurdles	49.60	4 q	—N/a		49.85	8	Did not advance	
David Freeman	1500 m	3:39.70	10	—N/a		Did not advance			
Félix Martínez	400 m	46.46	7	—N/a		Did not advance			

Women

Athlete	Event	Heat		Quarterfinal		Semifinal		Final	
Athlete	Event	Result	Rank	Result	Rank	Result	Rank	Result	Rank
Carol Rodríguez	200 m	24.07	7	Did not advance					
Carol Rodríguez	400 m	53.08	5	—N/a		Did not advance			

== Boxing ==
=== Men's team ===
Puerto Rico qualified five boxers for the Olympic boxing tournament. The Arroyo twins both qualified at the 2007 World Championships. Negron became the third Puerto Rican boxer to qualify, at the first American qualifying tournament. Pedraza and Gonzalez qualified at the second American continental qualifying tournament.

==== Men's flyweight class (48–51 kg) ====
McWilliams Arroyo Acevedo represented Puerto Rico as a boxer in the flyweight class (51 kilograms in weight or below). Born in Ceiba, one of Puerto Rico's easternmost cities, Arroyo is the twin brother of fellow Olympian boxer McJoe Arroyo. He participated in the Beijing Olympics at age 22, marking his first ever appearance at an Olympic Games. The Puerto Rican was placed in the first bout during the August 16 first round (known also as the Round of 16), where he faced Hungary's Norbert Kalucza. Arroyo scored 14 punches on Kalucza, while the Hungarian scored six punches in return. Thus, Arroyo defeated Norbert Kalucza and advanced to quarterfinals.

During the quarterfinal round of August 20, McWilliams Arroyo participated in the first bout. He challenged Cuba's Andris Laffita Hernandez and lost, scoring only two punches on Laffita while he scored 11 punches on Arroyo. As a result, the Puerto Rican boxer did not advance to the semifinal round on August 22.

==== Men's bantamweight class (51–54 kg) ====
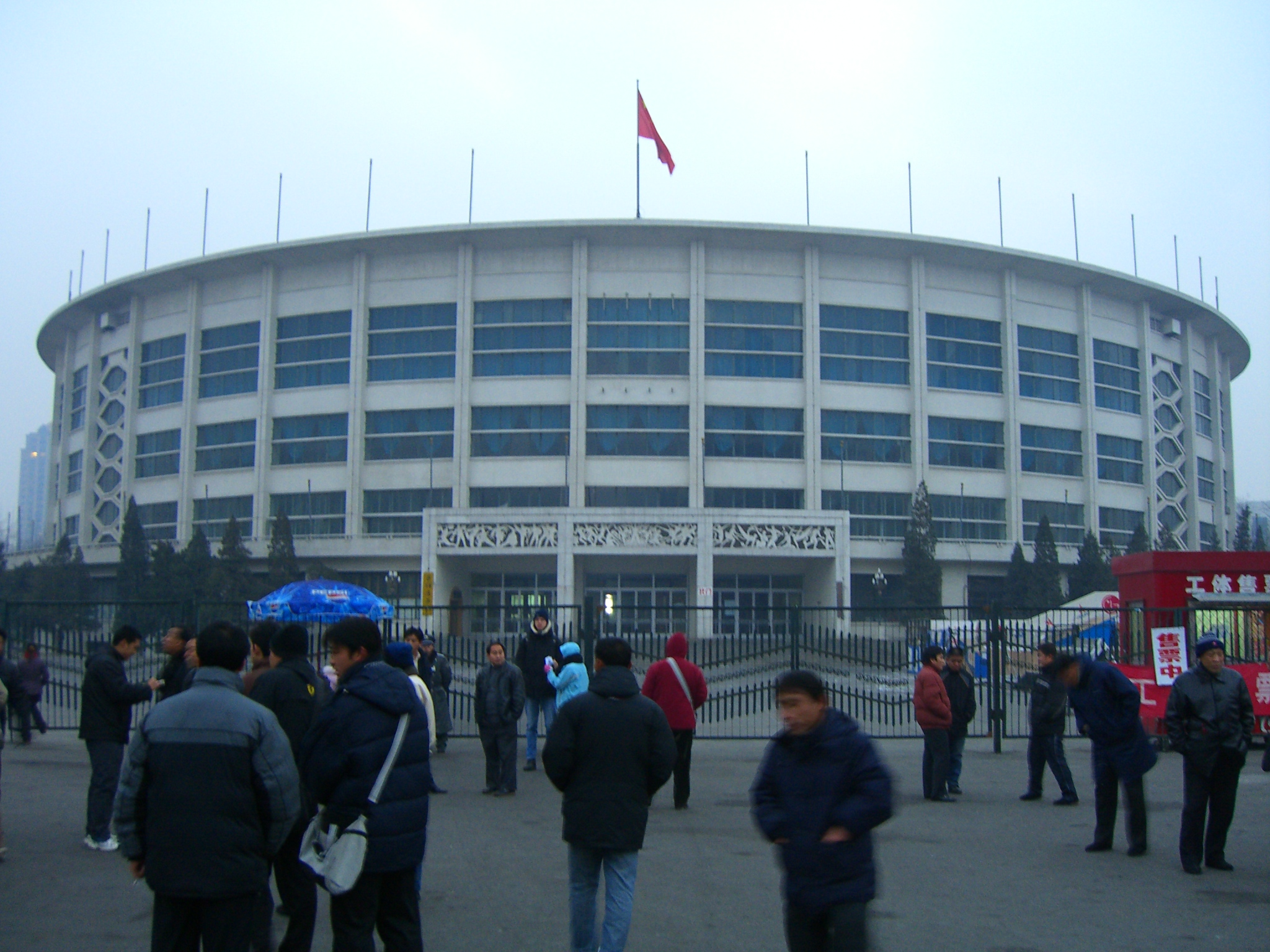
The Workers Indoor Arena, where Puerto Rico's five boxers competed in their events

McJoe Arroyo Acevedo also represented Puerto Rico in boxing, competing in the bantamweight class (under 54 kilograms in weight). Like his twin brother, McWilliams Arroyo, McJoe Arroyo was born in the city of Ceiba on Puerto Rico's eastern end and participated in the Beijing Olympics at the age of 22. Arroyo had not previously competed in any Olympic Games. The preliminary round of the event took place on August 12, where Arroyo challenged Russia's Sergey Vodopyanov in the sixth bout. Arroyo was defeated, scoring only five punches on Vodopyanov, who scored 10 in return. The Puerto Rican boxer did not advance to the next round.

==== Men's lightweight class (57–60 kg) ====
José "Sniper" Pedraza González competed for Puerto Rico in boxing. Participating in the men's lightweight class (under 60 kilograms in weight), Pedraza was 19 years old at the time he entered the Beijing Olympics. The boxer had not previously participated in any Olympic Games or events. During the preliminary round of the event, which took place on August 11, Pedraza competed in the ninth bout against Turkey's Onur Sipal. By the match's end, Sipal had been defeated, scoring only three punches on Pedraza while Pedraza scored ten in return. The Puerto Rican boxer advanced to the August 15 Round of 16, where he was pitted against France's Daouda Sow. Pedraza lost this round, scoring nine punches on Sow, who scored 13 in return. He did not advance to later rounds.

==== Men's light welterweight class (60–64 kg) ====
Jonathan "Mantequilla" González Ortíz competed at the Beijing Olympics on Puerto Rico's behalf, participating in the light welterweight class (64 kilograms in weight or less). Born in July 1989, González was 19 at the time he participated at the Beijing Olympics. He did not previously compete at any Olympic Games. During the preliminary round of his event, which occurred on August 10, González was placed in the eighth bout against a Romanian boxer named Ionut Gheorghe. González lost the bout, scoring four punches on Gheorghe, who scored 21 in return. He did not advance to later rounds.

==== Men's light heavyweight class (75–81 kg) ====
Carlos Negrón Colón participated in boxing events on Puerto Rico's behalf at the Beijing Olympics. Born in the southern inland town of Villalba, Negrón was 21 years old at the time of his participation in the Beijing Olympics of 2008 in the light heavyweight class (less than 81 kilograms in weight). Negrón had not previously competed in any Olympic Games. The preliminary round of his event took place on August 9, when he faced Iran's Mehdi Ghorbani in the eleventh bout. Negrón defeated Ghorbani, scoring four punches on him while receiving 13 in return. The Puerto Rican advanced to the next round.

The Round of 16 in Negrón's event took place on August 14, where the Puerto Rican boxer competed in the eighth bout. He was defeated by Yerkebulan Shynaliyev of Kazakhstan, who scored nine punches on Negrón. Carlos Negrón scored three punches in return. He did not advance to later rounds.

Athlete	Event	Round of 32	Round of 16	Quarterfinals	Semifinals	Final	
Athlete	Event	Opposition Result	Opposition Result	Opposition Result	Opposition Result	Opposition Result	Rank
McWilliams Arroyo	Flyweight	Bye	Kalucza (HUN); W 14–6	Laffita (CUB); L 2–11	Did not advance		
McJoe Arroyo	Bantamweight	Vodopyanov (RUS); L 5–10	Did not advance				
José Pedraza	Lightweight	Şipal (TUR); W 10–3	Sow (FRA); L 9–13	Did not advance			
Jonathan González	Light welterweight	Gheorghe (ROU); L 4–21	Did not advance				
Carlos Negrón	Light heavyweight	Ghorbani (IRI); W 13–4	Shynaliyev (KAZ); L 3–9	Did not advance			

Official Olympic Boxing Schedule

== Gymnastics ==
=== Artistic ===
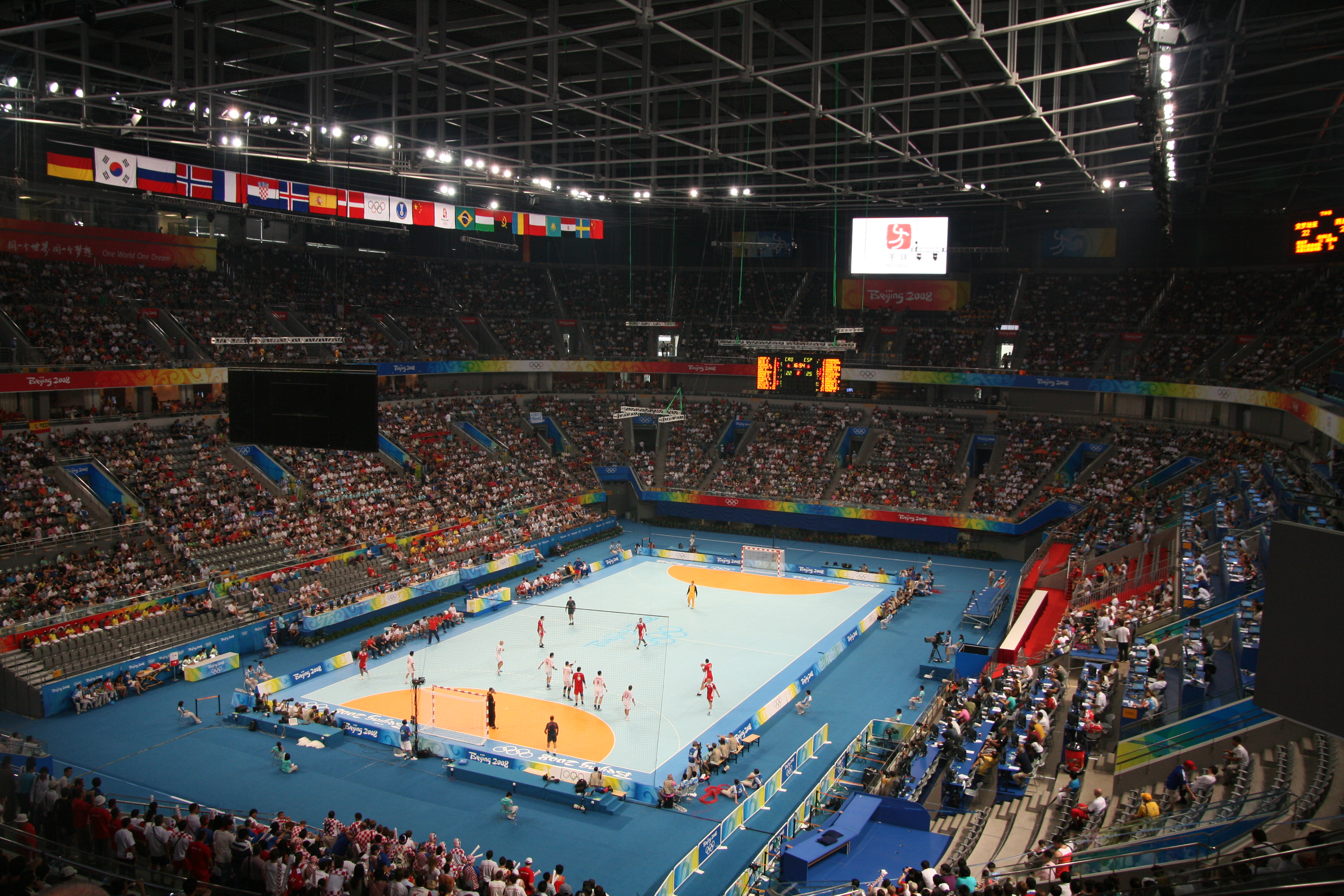
The Beijing National Indoor Stadium, the venue in which Rivera competed during his event

Luis Rivera represented Puerto Rico in artistic gymnastics, and was the only Puerto Rican gymnast to appear at the Beijing Olympics. Born in Humacao, a city on Puerto Rico's southeastern coast, Rivera has been affiliated with the Federación Puertorriqueña de Gimnasia (English: Puerto Rican Federation of Gymnastics) and participated in Beijing at age 21. He had not previously competed in any Olympic Games. During the preliminary round, which took place on August 9, Rivera competed against 97 other athletes. During the floor exercise, Rivera scored 15.125 points, placing 24th of the 98 athletes in this event. During the horse vault, Rivera ranked 13th after scoring 16.225 (this was on his first jump; his second jump scored 15.200). Next, during the parallel bars event, Luis Rivera ranked 61st after earning 14.575 points, and later earned 14.675 points in the horizontal bar. Rivera ranked 22nd in the still rings event after earning 15.250 points and placing 22nd, and finished out the qualification round on the pommel horse by ranking 20th with a score of 14.750. Overall, the Puerto Rican gymnast ranked 13th of the 27 advancing athletes, ending with a total score of 90.600 points. He placed ahead of Russia's Maxim Devyatovskiy (90.350 points) and behind Belarus' Dmitry Savitski (90.650 points). He advanced to the final round.

At finals, which took place on August 13, Rivera competed in all the events in which he had previously participated. He earned 15.250 points on the floor; 16.025 points on the horse vault; 14.375 points on the parallel bars; 14.275 points on the horizontal bar; 15.225 points on the still rings; and 15.025 points on the pommel horse. Overall, he earned 90.175 points and finished in 14th place. Rivera placed ahead of Canadian athlete Adam Wong (98.800 points) and behind German gymnast Philipp David Boy (90.675 points) in a heat led by China's gold medalist Yang Wei (94.575 points) and tailed by China's Chen Yibing (74.225 points).

Athlete	Event	Qualification								Final							
Athlete	Event	Apparatus						Total	Rank	Apparatus						Total	Rank
Athlete	Event	F	PH	R	V	PB	HB	Total	Rank	F	PH	R	V	PB	HB	Total	Rank
Luis Rivera	All-around	15.125	14.750	15.250	16.225	14.575	14.675	90.600	13 Q	15.250	15.025	15.225	16.025	14.375	14.275	90.175	14

Q = Qualified for final
Official Olympic Artistic Gymnastics Schedule

== Judo ==
Alexis Chiclana Melendez represented Puerto Rico in men's judo. He took part in the men's middleweight class, which includes athletes under 90 kilograms in weight. Chiclana, born in February 1987, participated in Beijing as a 21-year-old. He had not previously competed in any Olympic events. During the August 13 first round (also known as the Round of 32), Chiclana challenged Spain's David Alarza in the fourteenth match. Alarza defeated Chiclana using uchi mata, scoring ippon in the event. Chiclana did not progress to further rounds.

Pablo Figueroa Carillo participated in the sport of judo at the Beijing Olympics, representing Puerto Rico. He was born in 1981, and, in Beijing, took part in the men's heavyweight class alongside other athletes over 100 kilograms in weight. He had not participated earlier in any Olympic Games or events. Figueroa took part in the fifth match during the first round (or the Round of 32) on August 15 against Iceland's Thormodur Arni Jonsson. Pablo Figueroa was defeated by Jonsson, who used kosoto gari and scored ippon in the process. Figueroa did not progress to later rounds.

Abderramán Brenes la Roche also competed as a judoka on Puerto Rico's behalf. Born in 1978, Brenes participated in Beijing as a 29-year-old, taking part in the competitions of the half middleweight class (less than 81 kilograms in weight). Brenes had not previously competed in any Olympic Games. During the August 12 first round (or Round of 32), the judoka faced Italy's Giuseppe Maddaloni in the sixteenth match Maddaloni defeated the Puerto Rican athlete with a morote gari, scoring yuko. Brenes did not advance to later rounds.

Athlete	Event	Preliminary	Round of 32	Round of 16	Quarterfinals	Semifinals	Repechage 1	Repechage 2	Repechage 3	Final / BM	
Athlete	Event	Opposition Result	Opposition Result	Opposition Result	Opposition Result	Opposition Result	Opposition Result	Opposition Result	Opposition Result	Opposition Result	Rank
Abderramán Brenes	Men's −81 kg	Bye	Maddaloni (ITA); L 0001–0020	Did not advance							
Alexis Chiclana	Men's −90 kg	—N/a	Alarza (ESP); L 0100–1101	Did not advance							
Pablo Figueroa	Men's +100 kg	Bye	Jónsson (ISL); L 0001–1000	Did not advance							

== Shooting ==
Lucas Rafael Bennazar Ortíz participated in the Beijing Olympics as Puerto Rico's only sharpshooter. Born in the northern city of Guaynabo, Bennazar first participated in the Olympics as a 35-year-old in Athens that competed in the men's trap shooting and double trap. He again participated in the double trap when he returned to the Olympics as a 39-year-old. Bennazar took part in the preliminary round of the event, which took place on August 11. During this time, Bennazar earned 45 points in the first round; 39 points in the second round; and 39 points again in the third round. His overall score during preliminaries was 123 points, placing 17th out of 19 athletes. He defeated New Zealand's Graeme Ede (113 points) and fell behind Russia's Vitaly Fokeev (130 points), falling behind heat leader Walton Eller of the United States who set an Olympic record with his score (145 points). His score remained the same in the final round on August 12, and he remained in 17th place.

Men

Athlete	Event	Qualification		Final	
Athlete	Event	Points	Rank	Points	Rank
Lucas Rafael Bennazar Ortiz	Double trap	123	19	Did not advance	

== Swimming ==
=== Men's team ===
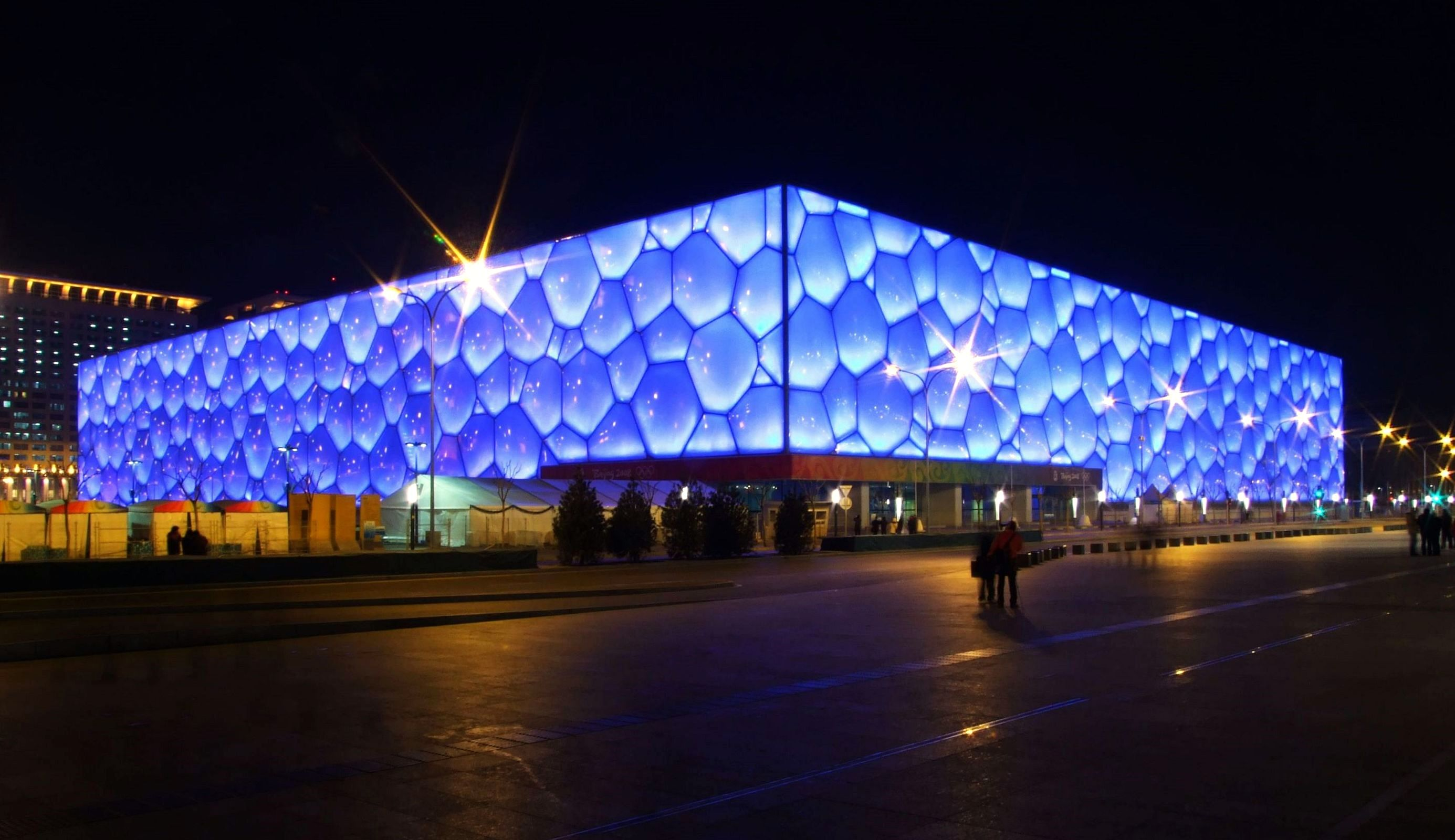
The Beijing National Aquatics Center, where the Lennox-Silvas, García and Velez participated in their events

Daniel Velez represented Puerto Rico as one of its two male swimmers at the Beijing Olympics. He was born in December 1983, making him 24 at the time of his participation at the 2008 Olympic Games. He swam in the 100 meters breaststroke, marking the first time he ever competed at an Olympic Games. During the August 9 preliminary round, Velez participated in the third heat against seven other athletes. He completed the event in 1:01.80, placing first in the heat ahead of India's second place finalist Sandeep Sejwal (1:02.19) and Paraguay's third place finalist Genaro Prono (1:02.32). Of the 63 competitors who finished the event, Velez placed 33rd. He did not advance to later rounds.

Douglas Lennox-Silva represented Puerto Rico in swimming events. Born in Fort Lauderdale, Florida, Lennox-Silva has been affiliated with the Lake Forest Swim Club in the Chicago area. He is the brother of Kristina Lennox-Silva, who also competed in the Beijing Olympics as a swimmer. The Puerto Rican swam in the men's 100 meters butterfly, which held its preliminary round on August 14. Lennox-Silva participated in the fifth heat against seven other athletes, placing fifth after finishing the race in 53.34 seconds. He displaced Canada's Adam Sioui (53.38 seconds), who placed sixth, but fell behind fifth-place finalist François Heersbrandt of Belgium (53.33 seconds). South Africa's Lyndon Ferns (52.04 seconds) and Croatia's Mario Todorović (52.26 seconds) led the heat. Of the 65 athletes who finished the preliminary round, Douglas Lennox-Silva placed 38th. He did not advance to later rounds.

Douglas Lennox-Silva also competed for Puerto Rico in the men's 200 meters butterfly race. During the August 11 preliminary round, Lennox-Silva was placed in the second heat, where he challenged seven other athletes. He finished the race in 2:01.69, placing sixth in the heat ahead of Serbia's Vladan Markovic (2:03.13), who placed seventh, and behind Venezuela's Alexis Márquez Rivas (2:01.25), who placed fifth. The heat itself was led by Filipino swimmer James Walsh (1:59.39) and Spain's Javier Núñez (2:00.24). 44 swimmers competed in the first round of the event, and Lennox-Silva placed 38th. He did not advance to later rounds.

=== Women's team ===
Vanessa García Vega participated in the women's 50 meters freestyle for Puerto Rico. Born in the territorial capital of San Juan, García first participated in the Olympics at the age of 20, when she represented Puerto Rico in both the women's 50 meters freestyle and women's 100 meters freestyle at the 2004 Olympics in Athens. She returned to the Olympics at age 24, this time only in the 50 meters freestyle in Beijing. During the preliminary round, which took place on August 15, García participated in the ninth heat against seven other athletes. She finished the event in 25.81 seconds, placing last in the heat behind Greece's Martha Matsa (25.68 seconds). The leaders of García's heat included Estonia's Triin Aljand (25.29 seconds) and Slovakia's Martina Moravcova (25.47 seconds). Of the 90 athletes who finished the event, García placed 35th. She did not advance to later rounds.

Kristina Lennox-Silva also represented Puerto Rico as a female swimmer in the 400 meters freestyle. Similar to her brother Douglas Lennox-Silva, Kristina Lennox-Silva swam for Villanova Swimming and Diving, at Villanova University just outside Philadelphia, Pennsylvania. She participated in the Beijing Olympics at age 23, and had not previously participated in any Olympic Games. In the women's 400 meters freestyle, Lennox-Silva participated during the seven-person second heat of the August 10 preliminary round. She ranked fourth in the heat, having finished the event in 4:20.17. She placed ahead of South Korea's Lee Ji-Eun (4:21.53) and behind Finland's Eva Lehtonen (4:20.07) in a heat led by Venezuela's Yanel Andreina Pinto Perez (4:18.09) and the Ukraine's Nataliya Khudyakova (4:18.34). Of the 41 athletes who participated in and completed the preliminary round, Lennox-Silva ranked 36th. She did not progress to the next round.

Kristina Lennox-Silva also participated in the women's 200 meters butterfly. She was placed in the first heat during the preliminary round of the event, which took place on August 12. Three other athletes participated in her heat. Kristina Lennox-Silva placed last of four athletes, earning a time of 2:17.27. She placed behind Ingvild Snildal of Norway (2:14.53) in a heat that was led by Greek first-place swimmer Eleftheria Evgenia Efstathiou (2:13.27) and Turkey's second-place athlete Gulsah Gunenc (2:14.44). Overall, 34 athletes finished the event's preliminary round. Lennox-Silva ranked last of those, and did not advance to later rounds.

=== Summary ===
Men

Athlete	Event	Heat		Semifinal		Final	
Athlete	Event	Time	Rank	Time	Rank	Time	Rank
Douglas Lennox-Silva	100 m butterfly	53.34	38	Did not advance			
Douglas Lennox-Silva	200 m butterfly	2:01.69	38	Did not advance			
Daniel Velez	100 m breaststroke	1:01.80	33	Did not advance			

Women

Athlete	Event	Heat		Semifinal		Final	
Athlete	Event	Time	Rank	Time	Rank	Time	Rank
Vanessa García	50 m freestyle	25.81	35	Did not advance			
Kristina Lennox-Silva	400 m freestyle	4:20.17	36	—N/a		Did not advance	
Kristina Lennox-Silva	200 m butterfly	2:17.27	34	Did not advance			

== Taekwondo ==
Ángel Román Martínez competed for Puerto Rico in taekwondo. Born in 1984, Román entered Beijing at age 24, competing in the men's welterweight class (which includes athletes under 80 kilograms in weight). Román had not previously competed in any Olympic Games or events. During the course of the competition's first round, which took place on August 22, Román faced Canada's Sébastien Michaud in the sixth match. The Puerto Rican judoka won a total of two deuk-jeom (points), with one in the first round and one in the third round, but lost a deuk-jeom to a deduction. His Canadian opponent scored a total of three deuk-jeom, but lost one to a deduction. Thus, as Michaud ended with a score higher than Román's score, Michaud won the round. Román did not advance to later rounds.

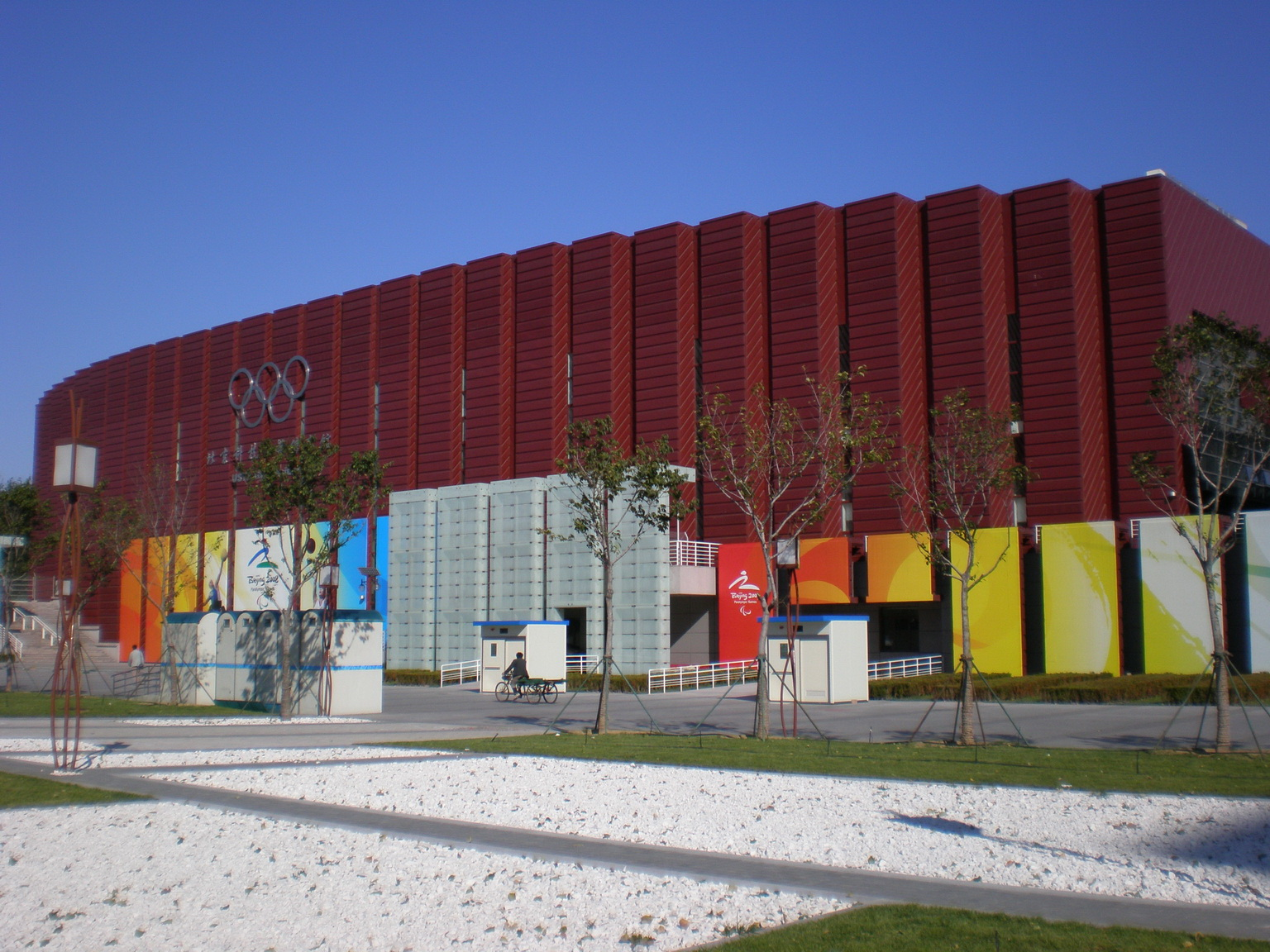
The Beijing Science and Technology University Gymnasium, where all taekwondo competitors participated in their events

Asunción Ocasio Rodríguez represented Puerto Rico in taekwondo at the Beijing Olympics, and was the only female athlete from Puerto Rico that Games to represent the commonwealth in the sport. Born in June 1987, Ocasio participated in the Beijing Olympics at age 21 in the welterweight division, which includes athletes under 67 kilograms in weight. During the qualification round of the event, Ocasio faced Greek athlete Elisavet Mystakidou. Both athletes scored one point on the other, but Ocasio defeated Mystakidou and advanced to the next round. Ocasio received a bye and skipped the first round's repechage round. During the quarterfinal round, Ocasio again participated in the first match, this time facing German athlete Helena Fromm. In this match, the Puerto Rican athlete scored two points on Fromm, who scored none in return. Ocasio defeated her German opponent and progressed to the next round. During the semifinal round, Asunción Ocasio now faced Canada's Karine Sergerie. Sergerie scored two points on Ocasio, who did not score any in return. Thus, Ocasio's Canadian opponent progressed to the gold medal match, while she challenged Croatia's Sandra Saric for the bronze medal. Saric defeated Ocasio by scoring five points on her, while Ocasio was only able to return one. She placed fifth in the event, tying Australia's Tina Morgan.

Athlete	Event	Round of 16	Quarterfinals	Semifinals	Repechage	Bronze Medal	Final	
Athlete	Event	Opposition Result	Opposition Result	Opposition Result	Opposition Result	Opposition Result	Opposition Result	Rank
Ángel Román	Men's −80 kg	Michaud (CAN); L 1–2	Did not advance					
Asunción Ocasio	Women's −67 kg	Mystakidou (GRE); W 1–0	Fromm (GER); W 2–0	Sergerie (CAN); L 0–2	Bye	Šarić (CRO); L 1–5	Did not advance	5

== Weightlifting ==
Geralee Vega Morales participated on Puerto Rico's behalf as its only weightlifter. Born in 1986, Vega was 22 at the time of her participation in Beijing. She took part in the women's lightweight event, which includes athletes under 58 kilograms in weight. She had not previously participated in any Olympic Games. Vega's event took place on August 11, and included 12 athletes in total. During the snatch phase of the event, Vega was given three attempts. She unsuccessfully attempted to lift 90 kilograms of weight during her first two attempts, but succeeded on her third, tying eighth in that part of the event. She then attempted 112 kilograms during the clean and jerk phrase of the event, successfully lifting it on her first attempt. She did not succeed in lifting 115 kilograms on her second attempt, or 116 kilograms on her third. Overall, the combination of her highest scores in snatch (90) and clean and jerk (112) yielded a score of 202 points. Geralee Vega Morales ranked ninth in the event, ahead of Poland's Marieta Gotfryd (200 points) and behind Romania's Roxana Cocos (204 points). China's Chen Yanqing set an Olympic record when she took the gold medal with 244 points.

Athlete	Event	Snatch		Clean & Jerk		Total	Rank
Athlete	Event	Result	Rank	Result	Rank	Total	Rank
Geralee Vega	Women's −58 kg	90	8	112	9	202	9

== See also ==
- Puerto Rico at the 2007 Pan American Games
- Puerto Rico at the 2008 Summer Paralympics
- Puerto Rico at the 2010 Central American and Caribbean Games
