= 2015 World Taekwondo Championships – Women's welterweight =

Taekwondo competition

Women's welterweight at the 2015 World Championships
- Venue: Traktor Ice Arena
- Dates: 14–15 May 2015
- Competitors: 40 from 40 nations

Medalists
gold medal	Chuang Chia-chia	Chinese Taipei
silver medal	Nur Tatar	Turkey
bronze medal	Paige McPherson	United States
bronze medal	Katherine Dumar	Colombia

The women's welterweight is a competition featured at the 2015 World Taekwondo Championships, and was held at the Traktor Ice Arena in Chelyabinsk, Russia on May 14 and May 15. Welterweights were limited to a maximum of 67 kilograms in body mass.

== Results ==
=== Finals ===
Semifinals		Final
Paige McPherson (USA)	4
Chuang Chia-chia (TPE)	5	Chuang Chia-chia (TPE)	5
Katherine Dumar (COL)	1	Nur Tatar (TUR)	0
Nur Tatar (TUR)	2

=== Top half ===
==== Section 1 ====
Round of 64
Matea Jelić (CRO)	3
Fatemeh Rouhani (IRI)	1
Tetiana Tetereviatnykova (UKR)	13
Chloe Aboud (IRL)	4

Round of 32
Elin Johansson (SWE)	5
Matea Jelić (CRO)	4
Ana Bajić (SRB)	6
Victoria Heredia (MEX)	0
Seham El-Sawalhy (EGY)	4
Jenna Partanen (FIN)	3
Tetiana Tetereviatnykova (UKR)	2
Paige McPherson (USA)	3

Round of 16
Elin Johansson (SWE)	2
Ana Bajić (SRB)	0
Seham El-Sawalhy (EGY)	4
Paige McPherson (USA)	5

Quarterfinals
Elin Johansson (SWE)	3
Paige McPherson (USA)	8

==== Section 2 ====
Round of 64
Patricia Figueroa (CHI)	3
Athanasia Mitsopoulou (GRE)	12
Julyana Al-Sadeq (JOR)	9
Iveta Jiránková (CZE)	1

Round of 32
Guo Yunfei (CHN)	10
Athanasia Mitsopoulou (GRE)	7
Vanessa Körndl (GER)	4
Melissa Pagnotta (CAN)	6
Lúa Piñeiro (ESP)	0
Hakima El-Meslahy (MAR)	2
Julyana Al-Sadeq (JOR)	7
Chuang Chia-chia (TPE)	16

Round of 16
Guo Yunfei (CHN)	3
Melissa Pagnotta (CAN)	2
Hakima El-Meslahy (MAR)	5
Chuang Chia-chia (TPE)	7

Quarterfinals
Guo Yunfei (CHN)	16
Chuang Chia-chia (TPE)	20

=== Bottom half ===
==== Section 3 ====
Round of 64
Chynea Lang (AUS)	3
Jagoda Ulfig (POL)	9
Yosselyn Molina (HON)	19
Beketele Gumedze (SWZ)	5

Round of 32
Anastasia Baryshnikova (RUS)	8
Jagoda Ulfig (POL)	1
Liu Qing (MAC)	1
Hwang Kyung-seon (KOR)	6
Katherine Dumar (COL)	14
Brieanna Hernandez (PUR)	2
Yosselyn Molina (HON)	2
Farida Azizova (AZE)	8

Round of 16
Anastasia Baryshnikova (RUS)	5
Hwang Kyung-seon (KOR)	6
Katherine Dumar (COL)	6
Farida Azizova (AZE)	3

Quarterfinals
Hwang Kyung-seon (KOR)	1
Katherine Dumar (COL)	7

==== Section 4 ====
Round of 64
Feruza Yergeshova (KAZ)	9
Sorn Seavmey (CAM)	6
Paloma Lima (BRA)	3
Alexis Arnoldt (ARG)	10

Round of 32
Nur Tatar (TUR)	10
Feruza Yergeshova (KAZ)	3
Chu Hoàng Diệu Linh (VIE)	2
Franka Anić (SLO)	10
Katherine Alvarado (CRC)	5
Nadège N'Dri (CIV)	2
Alexis Arnoldt (ARG)	3
Haby Niaré (FRA)	15

Round of 16
Nur Tatar (TUR)	4
Franka Anić (SLO)	1
Katherine Alvarado (CRC)	0
Haby Niaré (FRA)	4

Quarterfinals
Nur Tatar (TUR)	2
Haby Niaré (FRA)	1
