= 2009 World Taekwondo Championships – Women's welterweight =

Taekwondo competition

Women's welterweight at the 2009 World Championships
- Venue: Ballerup Super Arena
- Dates: 14 October 2009
- Competitors: 46 from 46 nations

Medalists
gold medal	Gwladys Épangue	France
silver medal	Taimí Castellanos	Cuba
bronze medal	Sandra Šarić	Croatia
bronze medal	Nikolina Kursar	Norway

The women's welterweight competition at the 2009 World Taekwondo Championships was held at the Ballerup Super Arena in Copenhagen, Denmark on October 14. Welterweights were limited to a maximum of 67 kilograms in body mass.

== Results ==
Legend

- DQ — Won by disqualification
- WD — Won by withdrawal

=== Finals ===
Semifinals		Final
Gwladys Épangue (FRA)	6
Sandra Šarić (CRO)	1	Gwladys Épangue (FRA)	1
Nikolina Kursar (NOR)	0	Taimí Castellanos (CUB)	0
Taimí Castellanos (CUB)	3

=== Top half ===
==== Section 1 ====
Round of 64
Auður Jónsdóttir (ISL)	1
Park Hye-mi (KOR)	22
Ijeoma Obi (NGR)	0
Niki Athanasopoulou (GRE)	4
Yevgeniya Koshlyak (UKR)	DQ
~~Teresia Musyoka (KEN)~~

Round of 32
Gwladys Épangue (FRA)	1
Park Hye-mi (KOR)	0
Lalsangzuali (IND)	DQ
~~Tanya Marshall (BAR)~~
Nur Tatar (TUR)	9
Niki Athanasopoulou (GRE)	1
Yevgeniya Koshlyak (UKR)	0
Helena Fromm (GER)	23

Round of 16
Gwladys Épangue (FRA)	8
Lalsangzuali (IND)	0
Nur Tatar (TUR)	3
Helena Fromm (GER)	2

Quarterfinals
Gwladys Épangue (FRA)	5
Nur Tatar (TUR)	1

==== Section 2 ====
Round of 64
~~Nguyễn Thị Đường (VIE)~~
Deysy Montes de Oca (DOM)	DQ
~~Hanan El-Hasan (PLE)~~
Milica Mandić (SRB)	DQ
Sylvia Barker (CAN)	3
Sandra Antonio (ANG)	0
Kelys Navarro (VEN)	6
Emina Ortaš (BIH)	3

Round of 32
Sandra Šarić (CRO)	5
Deysy Montes de Oca (DOM)	1
Milica Mandić (SRB)	1
Simona Hradilová (CZE)	3
Christina Børglum (DEN)	3
Sylvia Barker (CAN)	4
Kelys Navarro (VEN)	1
Gulnafis Aitmukhambetova (KAZ)	3

Round of 16
Sandra Šarić (CRO)	5
Simona Hradilová (CZE)	1
Sylvia Barker (CAN)
Gulnafis Aitmukhambetova (KAZ)	WD

Quarterfinals
Sandra Šarić (CRO)	5
Gulnafis Aitmukhambetova (KAZ)	2

=== Bottom half ===
==== Section 3 ====
Round of 64
Shaden Thweib (JOR)	0
Nia Abdallah (USA)	2
Nikolina Kursar (NOR)	4
Chara Savva (CYP)	3
Leyre Matute (ESP)	2
Chloe Iriyadi (AUS)	3
María Clemente (MEX)	3
Lida Hernández (COL)	0

Round of 32
~~Khaoula Ben Hamza (TUN)~~
Nia Abdallah (USA)	DQ
Nikolina Kursar (NOR)	4
Keyla Ávila (HON)	3
Fernanda Souza (BRA)	1
Chloe Iriyadi (AUS)	0
María Clemente (MEX)	5
Asunción Ocasio (PUR)	1

Round of 16
Nia Abdallah (USA)	2
Nikolina Kursar (NOR)	4
Fernanda Souza (BRA)	2
María Clemente (MEX)	4

Quarterfinals
Nikolina Kursar (NOR)	3
María Clemente (MEX)	2

==== Section 4 ====
Round of 64
Andrea St. Bernard (GRN)	0
Sun Ai-chi (TPE)	2
Guo Yunfei (CHN)	6
Natalia Rybarczyk (POL)	2
Toni Rivero (PHI)	1
Lie Kylborn (SWE)	3

Round of 32
Ekaterina Zenkina (RUS)	3
Sun Ai-chi (TPE)	2
Guo Yunfei (CHN)	6
Marjolijn Abbink (NED)	1
Hayley Schofield (NZL)	1
Taimí Castellanos (CUB)	6
Lie Kylborn (SWE)	2
Hakima El-Meslahy (MAR)	11

Round of 16
Ekaterina Zenkina (RUS)	4
Guo Yunfei (CHN)	6
Taimí Castellanos (CUB)	2
Hakima El-Meslahy (MAR)	1

Quarterfinals
Guo Yunfei (CHN)	2
Taimí Castellanos (CUB)	3
