= Taekwondo at the 2008 Summer Olympics – Women's 67 kg =

Taekwondo competition

Women's 67 kg at the Games of the XXIX Olympiad
- Venue: Beijing Science and Technology University Gymnasium
- Date: 22 August 2008
- Competitors: 16 from 16 nations

Medalists
1st place, gold medalist(s)		Hwang Kyung-Seon	South Korea
2nd place, silver medalist(s)		Karine Sergerie	Canada
3rd place, bronze medalist(s)		Sandra Šarić	Croatia
3rd place, bronze medalist(s)		Gwladys Épangue	France

The women's 67 kg competition in taekwondo at the 2008 Summer Olympics in Beijing took place on August 22 at the Beijing Science and Technology University Gymnasium.

== Competition format ==
The main bracket consisted of a single elimination tournament, culminating in the gold medal match. Two bronze medals were awarded at the taekwondo competitions. A repechage was used to determine the bronze medal winners. Every competitor who lost to one of the two finalists competed in the repechage, another single-elimination competition. Each semifinal loser faced the last remaining repechage competitor from the opposite half of the bracket in a bronze medal match.

== Schedule ==
All times are China standard time (UTC+8)

Date	Time	Round
Friday, 22 August 2008	09:00; 15:00; 17:00; 20:00	Preliminary Round; Quarterfinals; Semifinals; Final

== Qualifying Athletes ==
Athlete	Country
Elisavet Mystakidou	Greece
Asunción Ocasio	Puerto Rico
Mariama Dalanda Barry	Guinea
Helena Fromm	Germany
Tina Morgan	Australia
Karine Sergerie	Canada
Sibel Guler	Turkey
Vanina Sánchez	Argentina
Toni Rivero	Philippines
Sandra Šarić	Croatia
Hwang Kyung-Seon	South Korea
Maitha Al-Maktoum	United Arab Emirates
Mouna Benabderrassoul	Morocco
Yoriko Okamoto	Japan
Liya Nurkina	Kazakhstan
Gwladys Épangue	France

== Results ==
Legend

- PTG — Won by points gap
- SUP — Won by superiority
- OT — Won on over time (Golden Point)

=== Main bracket ===
Preliminary round
1	Elisavet Mystakidou (GRE)	0
16	Asunción Ocasio (PUR)	1
8	Mariama Dalanda Barry (GUI)	1
9	Helena Fromm (GER)	6
5	Tina Morgan (AUS)	0
12	Karine Sergerie (CAN)	0 (SUP)
4	Sibel Guler (TUR)	0
13	Vanina Sánchez (ARG)	4
6	Toni Rivero (PHI)	1
11	Sandra Šarić (CRO)	4
3	Hwang Kyung-Seon (KOR)	5
14	Maitha Al-Maktoum (UAE)	1
7	Mouna Benabderrassoul (MAR)	2
10	Yoriko Okamoto (JPN)	0
2	Liya Nurkina (KAZ)	0
15	Gwladys Épangue (FRA)	3

Quarterfinals
Asunción Ocasio (PUR)	2
Helena Fromm (GER)	0
Karine Sergerie (CAN)	3
Vanina Sánchez (ARG)	0
Sandra Šarić (CRO)	1
Hwang Kyung-Seon (KOR)	3
Mouna Benabderrassoul (MAR)	1
Gwladys Épangue (FRA)	1 (SUP)

Semifinals
Asunción Ocasio (PUR)	0
Karine Sergerie (CAN)	2
Hwang Kyung-Seon (KOR)	2
Gwladys Épangue (FRA)	1

Gold medal match
Karine Sergerie (CAN)	1
Hwang Kyung-Seon (KOR)	2

=== Repechage ===
Round 1
Sandra Šarić (CRO)	4
Maitha Al-Maktoum (UAE)	0
Tina Morgan (AUS)	9
Vanina Sánchez (ARG)	2

Bronze medal match
Sandra Šarić (CRO)	5
Asunción Ocasio (PUR)	1
Gwladys Épangue (FRA)	4
Tina Morgan (AUS)	1
