= 2013 World Taekwondo Championships – Women's welterweight =

Taekwondo competition

Women's welterweight at the 2013 World Championships
- Venue: Exhibition Center of Puebla
- Dates: 17 July 2013
- Competitors: 32 from 31 nations

Medalists
gold medal	Haby Niaré	France
silver medal	Anastasia Valueva	Chinese Taipei
bronze medal	Farida Azizova	Azerbaijan
bronze medal	Franka Anić	Slovenia

The women's welterweight is a competition featured at the 2013 World Taekwondo Championships, and was held at the Exhibition Center of Puebla in Puebla, Mexico on July 17.

Welterweights were limited to a maximum of 67 kilograms in body mass. 32 athletes participated in this event, including an Indian athlete under the name of World Taekwondo Federation.

Haby Niaré of France won the gold medal after beating Chuang Chia-chia of Chinese Taipei 5–4. Chuang won this title two years later in Chelyabinsk.

== Results ==
- DQ — Won by disqualification

=== Final ===
Final
Chuang Chia-chia (TPE)	4
Haby Niaré (FRA)	5

=== Top half ===
Round of 32
Nur Tatar (TUR)	11
Cristiana Rizzelli (ITA)	8
Chuang Chia-chia (TPE)	18
Patricia Figueroa (CHI)	2
Zhadyra Otemis (KAZ)	0
Shokraneh Izadi (IRI)	16
Lúa Piñeiro (ESP)	8
Victoria Heredia (MEX)	6
Farida Azizova (AZE)	4
Fanai Lalrempuii (WTF)	0
Marina Souza (BRA)	2
Dajana Perišić (SRB)	6
Katherine Alvarado (CRC)	13
Yosselyn Molina (HON)	6
Tamara Freites (VEN)	0
Guo Yunfei (CHN)	16

Round of 16
Nur Tatar (TUR)	3
Chuang Chia-chia (TPE)	4
Shokraneh Izadi (IRI)	6
Lúa Piñeiro (ESP)	7
Farida Azizova (AZE)	3
Dajana Perišić (SRB)	2
Katherine Alvarado (CRC)	1
Guo Yunfei (CHN)	9

Quarterfinals
Chuang Chia-chia (TPE)	3
Lúa Piñeiro (ESP)	2
Farida Azizova (AZE)	3
Guo Yunfei (CHN)	0

Semifinals
Chuang Chia-chia (TPE)	8
Farida Azizova (AZE)	5

=== Bottom half ===
Round of 32
Paige McPherson (USA)	DQ
~~Urgence Mouegha (GAB)~~
Nguyễn Thanh Hiền (VIE)	1
Liu Qing (MAC)	15
Nathalie Iliesco (CAN)	4
Aleksandrę Krzemieniecką (POL)	3
Anastasia Baryshnikova (RUS)	3
Franka Anić (SLO)	12
Petra Matijašević (CRO)	24
Nadège N'Dri (CIV)	4
Jane Narra (PHI)	1
Anastasia Delidimitri (GRE)	8
Katherine Dumar (COL)	0
Kim Jan-di (KOR)	10
Alexis Arnoldt (ARG)	1
Haby Niaré (FRA)	7

Round of 16
Paige McPherson (USA)	3
Liu Qing (MAC)	4
Nathalie Iliesco (CAN)	0
Franka Anić (SLO)	1
Petra Matijašević (CRO)	11
Anastasia Delidimitri (GRE)	6
Kim Jan-di (KOR)	3
Haby Niaré (FRA)	4

Quarterfinals
Liu Qing (MAC)	4
Franka Anić (SLO)	6
Petra Matijašević (CRO)	0
Haby Niaré (FRA)	2

Semifinals
Franka Anić (SLO)	0
Haby Niaré (FRA)	2
