= Taekwondo at the 2010 Asian Games – Women's 67 kg =

Taekwondo competition

Women's 67 kg at the 2010 Asian Games
- Venue: Guangdong Gymnasium
- Date: 19 November 2010
- Competitors: 7 from 7 nations

Medalists
gold medal	Guo Yunfei	China
silver medal	Parisa Farshidi	Iran
bronze medal	Gulnafis Aitmukhambetova	Kazakhstan
bronze medal	Kang Bo-hyeon	South Korea

The women's welterweight (−67 kilograms) event at the 2010 Asian Games took place on 19 November 2010 at Guangdong Gymnasium, Guangzhou, China.

== Schedule ==
All times are China Standard Time (UTC+08:00)

Date	Time	Event
Friday, 19 November 2010	14:00	Quarterfinals
Friday, 19 November 2010	14:00	Semifinals
Friday, 19 November 2010	16:30	Final

== Results ==
Legend

- R — Won by referee stop contest

Quarterfinals		Semifinals		Final
		Parisa Farshidi (IRI)	4
Chuang Chia-chia (TPE)	2	Gulnafis Aitmukhambetova (KAZ)	3
Gulnafis Aitmukhambetova (KAZ)	3			Parisa Farshidi (IRI)	2
Rasna K. C. (NEP)	1			Guo Yunfei (CHN)	4
Kang Bo-hyeon (KOR)	18^{R}	Kang Bo-hyeon (KOR)	0
Chu Hoàng Diệu Linh (VIE)	4	Guo Yunfei (CHN)	3
Guo Yunfei (CHN)	6
