= Taekwondo at the 2012 Summer Olympics – Women's 67 kg =

Taekwondo competition

Women's 67kg at the Games of the XXX Olympiad
- Venue: ExCeL Exhibition Centre
- Date: 10 August
- Competitors: 16 from 16 nations

Medalists
1st place, gold medalist(s)		Hwang Kyung-Seon	South Korea
2nd place, silver medalist(s)		Nur Tatar	Turkey
3rd place, bronze medalist(s)		Paige McPherson	United States
3rd place, bronze medalist(s)		Helena Fromm	Germany

The women's 67 kg competition at the 2012 Summer Olympics was held on 10 August, at the ExCeL Exhibition Centre.

== Competition format ==
The main bracket consisted of a single elimination tournament, culminating in the gold medal match. Two bronze medals were awarded at the Taekwondo competitions. A repechage was used to determine the bronze medal winners. Every competitor who lost to one of the two finalists competed in the repechage, another single-elimination competition. Each semifinal loser faced the last remaining repechage competitor from the opposite half of the bracket in a bronze medal match.

== Schedule ==
All times are British Summer Time (UTC+1)

Date	Time	Round
Friday, 10 August 2012	09:00; 15:00; 17:00; 22:15	Preliminary Round; Quarterfinals; Semifinals; Final

== Results ==
On 13 July 2012, the World Taekwondo Federation released the provisional draw which included the top eight seeds for the competition. The remainder of the qualified athletes were randomly drawn on 6 August 2012.

=== Main Bracket ===
Preliminary round
1	Seham El Sawalhy (EGY)	0
Elin Johansson (SWE)	6
Sousan Hajipour (IRI)	4
8	Carmen Marton (AUS)	5 (SUD)
5	Nur Tatar (TUR)	5
Andrea St. Bernard (GRN)	1
Paige McPherson (USA)	5
4	Sarah Stevenson (GBR)	1
3	Hwang Kyung-Seon (KOR)	4
Ruth Gbagbi (CIV)	1
Chu Hoang Dieu Linh (VIE)	1
6	Helena Fromm (GER)	13 (PTG)
7	G Aytmukhambetova (KAZ)	11
Franka Anić (SLO)	15
Farida Azizova (AZE)	0
2	Karine Sergerie (CAN)	1

Quarterfinals
Elin Johansson (SWE)	3
8	Carmen Marton (AUS)	6
5	Nur Tatar (TUR)	6
Paige McPherson (USA)	1
3	Hwang Kyung-Seon (KOR)	8
6	Helena Fromm (GER)	4
Franka Anić (SLO)	10
2	Karine Sergerie (CAN)	5

Semifinals
8	Carmen Marton (AUS)	0
5	Nur Tatar (TUR)	6
3	Hwang Kyung-Seon (KOR)	7
Franka Anić (SLO)	0

Gold medal match
5	Nur Tatar (TUR)	5
3	Hwang Kyung-Seon (KOR)	12

=== Repechage ===
Preliminary Round
Andrea St. Bernard (GRN)	2
Paige McPherson (USA)	15 (PTG)
Ruth Gbagbi (CIV)	3
Helena Fromm (GER)	4

Bronze Medal Contest
Paige McPherson (USA)	8
Franka Anić (SLO)	3
Carmen Marton (AUS)	2
Helena Fromm (GER)	8
