= Taekwondo at the 2015 European Games – Women's 67 kg =

Taekwondo competition

Women's 67 kg at the 2015 European Games
- Venue: Crystal Hall complex
- Date: 18 June
- Competitors: 16 from 16 nations

Medalists
gold medal	Anastasia Baryshnikova	Russia
silver medal	Farida Azizova	Azerbaijan
bronze medal	Nur Tatar	Turkey
bronze medal	Elin Johansson	Sweden

Women's 67 kg competition at the Taekwondo at the 2015 European Games in Baku, Azerbaijan, took place on 18 June at Crystal Hall complex.

== Schedule ==
All times are Azerbaijan Summer Time (UTC+5).

Date	Time	Event
Tuesday, 18 June 2015	11:00	1/8 finals
Tuesday, 18 June 2015	13:00	Quarterfinals
Tuesday, 18 June 2015	13:00	Semifinals
Tuesday, 18 June 2015	15:00	Repechage
Tuesday, 18 June 2015	19:00	Finals

== Results ==
1/8 finals
Elin Johansson (SWE)	14
Chloe Aboud (IRL)	6
Franka Anić (SLO)	4
Rabia Gülec (GER)	3
Nur Tatar (TUR)	5
Ana Bajić (SRB)	3
Joyce van Baaren (NED)	0
Farida Azizova (AZE)	2
Anastasia Baryshnikova (RUS)	6
Tetiana Tetereviatnykova (UKR)	4
Aleksandra Krzemieniecka (POL)	3
Marina Sumić (CRO)	1
Nina Kläy (SUI)	5
Lua Piñeiro (ESP)	7
Elpida Dimitropoulou (GRE)	3
Haby Niaré (FRA)	13

Quarterfinals
Elin Johansson (SWE)	5
Franka Anić (SLO)	4
Nur Tatar (TUR)	2
Farida Azizova (AZE)	6
Anastasia Baryshnikova (RUS)	11
Aleksandra Krzemieniecka (POL)	3
Lua Piñeiro (ESP)	4
Haby Niaré (FRA)	8

Semifinals
Elin Johansson (SWE)	2
Farida Azizova (AZE)	5
Anastasia Baryshnikova (RUS)	11
Haby Niaré (FRA)	3

Final
Farida Azizova (AZE)	5
Anastasia Baryshnikova (RUS)	6

=== Repechage ===
Repechage round 1
Nur Tatar (TUR)	3
Joyce van Baaren (NED)	0
Tetiana Tetereviatnykova (UKR)	4
Aleksandra Krzemieniecka (POL)	2

Bronze medal match
Haby Niaré (FRA)	7
Nur Tatar (TUR)	8
Tetiana Tetereviatnykova (UKR)	1
Elin Johansson (SWE)	2
