= Swimming at the 2008 Summer Olympics – Women's 800 metre freestyle =

Women's 800 metre freestyle at the Games of the XXIX Olympiad
- Venue: Beijing National Aquatics Center
- Date: August 14, 2008 (heats); August 16, 2008 (final)
- Competitors: 36 from 29 nations
- Winning time: 8:14.10 WR

Medalists
| 1st place, gold medalist(s) | | Rebecca Adlington | Great Britain |
| 2nd place, silver medalist(s) | | Alessia Filippi | Italy |
| 3rd place, bronze medalist(s) | | Lotte Friis | Denmark |

The women's 800 metre freestyle event at the 2008 Olympic Games took place on 14 and 16 August at the Beijing National Aquatics Center in Beijing, China.

Great Britain's Rebecca Adlington broke one of the oldest world records in the book to claim a second Olympic gold, following her first triumph in the 400 m freestyle. She touched the wall first in 8:14.10, slashing 2.12-second deficit off Janet Evans' world record which had stood for nearly 19 years.

Coming from sixth place in the 350-metre lap, Italy's Alessia Filippi registered a time of 8:20.23 for a silver medal. Lotte Friis ended Denmark's 20-year medal drought in swimming to claim a bronze in 8:23.03, edging out Romania's Camelia Potec (8:23.03) on the final lap by eight-hundredths of a second. China's Li Xuanxu finished fifth with a time of 8:26.34, and was followed in the sixth spot by Australia's Kylie Palmer in 8:26.39. Russia's Yelena Sokolova (8:29.79) and another Brit Cassandra Patten (8:32.35) rounded out the finale. Notable swimmers missed out the top 8 final featuring U.S. top favorites Katie Hoff and Kate Ziegler, both of whom placed tenth and eleventh in the prelims race.

Earlier in the prelims, Adlington established a new Olympic standard in a top-seeded time of 8:18.06 to cut down Brooke Bennett's 2000 record by a 1.59-second deficit.

== Records ==
Prior to this competition, the existing world and Olympic records were as follows.

| World record | Janet Evans (USA) | 8:16.22 | Tokyo, Japan | 20 August 1989 | |
| Olympic record | Brooke Bennett (USA) | 8:19.67 | Sydney, Australia | 22 September 2000 | - |

The following new world and Olympic records were set during this competition.

| Date | Event | Name | Nationality | Time | Record |
|---|---|---|---|---|---|
| August 14 | Heat 4 | Rebecca Adlington | Great Britain | 8:18.06 | OR |
| August 16 | Final | Rebecca Adlington | Great Britain | 8:14.10 | WR |

== Results ==
=== Heats ===
| Rank | Heat | Lane | Name | Nationality | Time | Notes |
|---|---|---|---|---|---|---|
| 1 | 4 | 4 | Rebecca Adlington | Great Britain | 8:18.06 | Q, OR, ER |
| 2 | 3 | 5 | Camelia Potec | Romania | 8:19.70 | Q, NR |
| 3 | 4 | 2 | Lotte Friis | Denmark | 8:21.74 | Q, NR |
| 4 | 5 | 5 | Alessia Filippi | Italy | 8:21.95 | Q |
| 5 | 4 | 3 | Kylie Palmer | Australia | 8:22.81 | Q, OC |
| 6 | 5 | 1 | Yelena Sokolova | Russia | 8:23.07 | Q, NR |
| 7 | 3 | 6 | Li Xuanxu | China | 8:24.37 | Q, AS |
| 8 | 5 | 7 | Cassandra Patten | Great Britain | 8:25.91 | Q |
| 9 | 4 | 1 | Wendy Trott | South Africa | 8:26.21 | AF |
| 10 | 5 | 4 | Kate Ziegler | United States | 8:26.98 | |
| 11 | 3 | 4 | Katie Hoff | United States | 8:27.78 | |
| 12 | 5 | 6 | Coralie Balmy | France | 8:28.34 | |
| 13 | 3 | 3 | Flavia Rigamonti | Switzerland | 8:28.67 | |
| 14 | 3 | 8 | Andreina Pinto | Venezuela | 8:30.30 | NR |
| 15 | 4 | 7 | You Meihong | China | 8:31.11 | |
| 16 | 5 | 3 | Erika Villaécija | Spain | 8:32.27 | |
| 17 | 5 | 8 | Melissa Gorman | Australia | 8:32.34 | |
| 18 | 2 | 4 | Susana Escobar | Mexico | 8:33.51 | NR |
| 19 | 5 | 2 | Sophie Huber | France | 8:33.76 | |
| 20 | 2 | 5 | Kristel Köbrich | Chile | 8:34.25 | |
| 21 | 3 | 1 | Maiko Fujino | Japan | 8:35.60 | |
| 22 | 2 | 1 | Jördis Steinegger | Austria | 8:36.40 | NR |
| 23 | 3 | 7 | Tanya Hunks | Canada | 8:38.05 | |
| 24 | 2 | 3 | Gabriella Fagundez | Sweden | 8:39.06 | NR |
| 25 | 4 | 6 | Jaana Ehmcke | Germany | 8:39.51 | |
| 26 | 2 | 6 | Réka Nagy | Hungary | 8:40.38 | |
| 27 | 4 | 5 | Ai Shibata | Japan | 8:41.63 | |
| 28 | 4 | 8 | Eleftheria Evgenia Efstathiou | Greece | 8:41.65 | |
| 29 | 1 | 4 | Au Hoishun Stephanie | Hong Kong | 8:41.66 | |
| 30 | 2 | 8 | Lynette Lim | Singapore | 8:45.56 | |
| 31 | 2 | 2 | Cecilia Biagioli | Argentina | 8:50.18 | |
| 32 | 1 | 5 | Golda Marcus | El Salvador | 8:51.21 | |
| 33 | 1 | 3 | Eva Lehtonen | Finland | 8:53.50 | |
| 34 | 2 | 7 | Khoo Cai Lin | Malaysia | 9:04.86 | |
| 35 | 1 | 6 | Karolina Szczepaniak | Poland | 9:08.87 | |
| | 3 | 2 | Federica Pellegrini | Italy | DNS | |

=== Final ===
| Rank | Lane | Name | Nationality | Time | Notes |
|---|---|---|---|---|---|
| 1st place, gold medalist(s) | 4 | Rebecca Adlington | Great Britain | 8:14.10 | WR |
| 2nd place, silver medalist(s) | 6 | Alessia Filippi | Italy | 8:20.23 | NR |
| 3rd place, bronze medalist(s) | 3 | Lotte Friis | Denmark | 8:23.03 | |
| 4 | 5 | Camelia Potec | Romania | 8:23.11 | |
| 5 | 1 | Li Xuanxu | China | 8:26.34 | |
| 6 | 2 | Kylie Palmer | Australia | 8:26.39 | |
| 7 | 7 | Yelena Sokolova | Russia | 8:29.79 | |
| 8 | 8 | Cassandra Patten | Great Britain | 8:32.35 | |
