= Swimming at the 2008 Summer Olympics – Women's 400 metre freestyle =

Women's 400 metre freestyle at the Games of the XXIX Olympiad
- Venue: Beijing National Aquatics Center
- Date: August 10, 2008 (heats); August 11, 2008 (final)
- Competitors: 42 from 35 nations
- Winning time: 4:03.22

Medalists
1st place, gold medalist(s)		Rebecca Adlington	Great Britain
2nd place, silver medalist(s)		Katie Hoff	United States
3rd place, bronze medalist(s)		Joanne Jackson	Great Britain

The women's 400 metre freestyle event at the 2008 Olympic Games took place on 10–11 August at the Beijing National Aquatics Center in Beijing, China. The winning margin was 0.07 seconds which as of 2024 is the narrowest winning margin for this event in the Olympics.

Rebecca Adlington became Great Britain's first female gold medalist in swimming in 48 years. She posted an outside-record time of 4:03.22 to pip U.S. swimmer Katie Hoff in the final 5 metres after a 1.46-second deficit, with one length to go. Hoff added a silver to her hardware from the 400 m individual medley just a day earlier, in 4:03.29. Adlington's teammate Joanne Jackson earned a bronze in 4:03.52, handing 2 of the 3 medals won by Team GB in the pool.

France's Coralie Balmy narrowly missed the podium by eight hundredths of a second (0.08), finishing in fourth place at 4:03.60. Italy's world record holder and top favorite Federica Pellegrini earned a fifth spot in a time of 4:04.56, holding off Romania's Camelia Potec to sixth by 0.10 of a second (4:04.66). Australia's Bronte Barratt (4:05.05) and defending Olympic champion Laure Manaudou (4:11.26) closed out the field.

Notable swimmers missed out the top 8 final, featuring Poland's Otylia Jędrzejczak, silver medalist in Athens four years earlier, Hoff's teammate Kate Ziegler, and South Africa's Wendy Trott, who broke a new African record (4:08.38) in the heats.

Earlier in the prelims, Pellegrini, Hoff, Jackson, and Adlington broke one of the oldest Olympic records in the book as they each went under the time of 4:03.85, which had stood since Janet Evans won the gold medal in the event at the 1988 Summer Olympics in Seoul.

== Records ==
Prior to this competition, the existing world and Olympic records were as follows:

World record	Federica Pellegrini (ITA)	4:01.53	Eindhoven, Netherlands	24 March 2008
Olympic record	Janet Evans (USA)	4:03.85	Seoul, South Korea	22 September 1988

The following new world and Olympic records were set during this competition.

Date	Event	Name	Nationality	Time	Record
August 10	Heat 5	Katie Hoff	United States	4:03.71	OR
August 10	Heat 6	Federica Pellegrini	Italy	4:02.19	OR

== Results ==
=== Heats ===
Rank	Heat	Lane	Name	Nationality	Time	Notes
1	6	4	Federica Pellegrini	Italy	4:02.19	Q, OR
2	6	3	Rebecca Adlington	Great Britain	4:02.24	Q, NR
3	5	4	Katie Hoff	United States	4:03.71	Q
4	5	6	Joanne Jackson	Great Britain	4:03.80	Q
5	5	3	Bronte Barratt	Australia	4:04.16	Q, OC
6	5	5	Coralie Balmy	France	4:04.25	Q
7	4	6	Camelia Potec	Romania	4:04.55	Q
8	4	4	Laure Manaudou	France	4:04.93	Q
9	4	5	Otylia Jędrzejczak	Poland	4:05.50	
10	4	3	Linda Mackenzie	Australia	4:05.91	
11	6	1	Stephanie Horner	Canada	4:07.45	
12	5	2	Wendy Trott	South Africa	4:08.38	AF
13	5	7	Lotte Friis	Denmark	4:08.47	
14	6	5	Kate Ziegler	United States	4:09.59	
14	6	7	Flavia Rigamonti	Switzerland	4:09.59	
16	4	8	Jördis Steinegger	Austria	4:09.72	NR
17	6	2	Melissa Corfe	South Africa	4:10.54	
18	5	1	Gabriella Fagundez	Sweden	4:11.40	
19	4	1	Savannah King	Canada	4:11.49	
20	3	3	Susana Escobar	Mexico	4:11.99	NR
21	3	5	Monique Ferreira	Brazil	4:12.21	
22	4	7	Tan Miao	China	4:12.35	
23	4	2	Erika Villaécija	Spain	4:14.25	
24	3	6	Hoi Shun Stephanie Au	Hong Kong	4:14.82	
25	6	8	Jaana Ehmcke	Germany	4:15.15	
26	5	8	Li Mo	China	4:15.50	
27	3	2	Eleftheria Evgenia Efstathiou	Greece	4:15.78	
28	3	4	Daria Belyakina	Russia	4:16.21	
29	1	4	Boglárka Kapás	Hungary	4:16.22	
30	3	1	Lynette Lim	Singapore	4:17.67	
31	6	6	Ai Shibata	Japan	4:17.96	
32	2	2	Yanel Pinto	Venezuela	4:18.09	
33	2	1	Nataliya Khudyakova	Ukraine	4:18.34	
34	3	7	Cecilia Biagioli	Argentina	4:19.85	
35	2	7	Eva Lehtonen	Finland	4:20.07	
36	2	3	Kristina Lennox-Silva	Puerto Rico	4:20.17	
37	2	6	Lee Ji-eun	South Korea	4:21.53	
38	2	5	Khoo Cai Lin	Malaysia	4:23.37	
39	2	4	Golda Marcus	El Salvador	4:23.50	
40	3	8	Yang Chin-kuei	Chinese Taipei	4:24.78	
41	1	3	Shrone Austin	Seychelles	4:35.86	
	1	5	Natthanan Junkrajang	Thailand	DNS	

=== Final ===
Rank	Lane	Name	Nationality	Time	Notes
1st place, gold medalist(s)	5	Rebecca Adlington	Great Britain	4:03.22	
2nd place, silver medalist(s)	3	Katie Hoff	United States	4:03.29	
3rd place, bronze medalist(s)	6	Joanne Jackson	Great Britain	4:03.52	
4	7	Coralie Balmy	France	4:03.60	
5	4	Federica Pellegrini	Italy	4:04.56	
6	1	Camelia Potec	Romania	4:04.66	
7	2	Bronte Barratt	Australia	4:05.05	
8	8	Laure Manaudou	France	4:11.26	
