= Park Hye-mi =

South Korean taekwondo practitioner

Personal information
- Nationality: South Korean

Sport
- Sport: Taekwondo
Medal record
Representing South Korea
Women's taekwondo
World Championships
| Silver medal – second place | 2007 Beijing | Lightweight |
Asian Championships
| Gold medal – first place | 2008 Henan | -63 kg |

Park Hye-mi is a South Korean taekwondo practitioner.

She won a silver medal in lightweight at the 2007 World Taekwondo Championships, after being defeated by Karine Sergerie in the final. She won a gold medal at the 2008 Asian Taekwondo Championships. She participated in welterweight at the 2009 World Taekwondo Championships, where she was defeated by eventual gold medalist Gwladys Épangue at an early stage.
