= Jaana Ehmcke =

German swimmer

Personal information
- Born: May 18, 1987 (age 39) Bremen, West Germany

Sport
- Sport: Swimming

Jaana Ehmcke (born 18 May 1987,) is a German swimmer. She is trained by Jörg Hoffmann. In 2006, she took part in the European Short Course Swimming Championships in Helsinki. She also represented Germany in the women's 400 metre and 800 metre freestyle swimming races at the 2008 Summer Olympics in Beijing.
