= Eva Lehtonen =

Finnish swimmer (born 1991)

Personal information
- Full name: Eva Lehtonen
- National team: Finland
- Born: 6 June 1991 (age 35) Helsinki, Finland
- Height: 1.68 m (5 ft 6 in)
- Weight: 60 kg (130 lb)

Sport
- Sport: Swimming
- Strokes: Freestyle
- Club: Oakland Live Y'ers (U.S.)
- College team: University of Florida; Florida Gulf Coast University
- Coach: Jeff Cooper (club)

Eva Lehtonen (born June 6, 1991) is a Finnish competition swimmer who specialized in long-distance freestyle events. Lehtonen holds five Finnish records in the same stroke, including a 1500 m freestyle record that dated back to 1983, before she set a mark of 17:18.16 at the 2007 USA Junior National Meet in Indianapolis, Indiana.

Representing her birth nation Finland, Lehtonen competed in his long-distance freestyle double at the 2008 Summer Olympics in Beijing. She finished with a top-eight fastest time of 4:19.53 (400 m freestyle) and 8:52.20 (800 m freestyle), respectively, to beat the FINA B-cut at the Texas Senior Circuit in the College Station, Texas. In the 400 m freestyle, Lehtonen rallied from behind at the start to hold off a fast-charging Puerto Rican swimmer Kristina Lennox-Silva to take the third spot in heat two and thirty-fifth overall by a tenth of a second (0.10) with 4:20.07. Five days later, in the 800 m freestyle, Lehtonen tried to maintain her pace smoothly over El Salvador's Golda Marcus throughout the race with only 250 metres to go in heat one, before fading down the stretch to touch the wall with a third-place time and thirty-third overall in 8:53.50.

Since 2008, Lehtonen was previously a member of the swimming team for the Florida Gators swimming and diving team of the University of Florida, before she transferred to Florida Gulf Coast University and joined the Florida Gulf Coast Eagles in 2011. She is currently a biomedical engineering major at the Florida Gulf Coast University in Fort Myers, Florida. Lehtonen currently resides with her family in Rochester, Michigan, and trains full-time at the Oakland Live Y'ers Swimming Club under her coaches Jeff Cooper and Dan Hafner.
