= Lake Forest Swim Club =

Private year-round USA Swimming program in Illinois, USA

Lake Forest Swim Club (LFSC) is a private year-round USA Swimming program located in Lake Forest, Illinois. Since its founding in 1960, LFSC has established itself as a premier swim club locally, regionally, and nationally with over 50 state championship titles and 10 club members swimming in the Olympic Games.

Members of the club range from 5 years old to college age. LFSC utilizes swimming facilities at Lake Forest College, Lake Forest Academy, and the outdoor Olympic distance pool of the village of Lake Bluff's park district during the summer season.

LFSC has been recognized for its exceptional coaching. Multiple coaches have served in roles on the US Olympic team - one as Assistant Manager for the 2004 Olympic team and another as the Head Manager of Open Water swimming for the 2016 Olympic team.

In March 2016, LFSC hosted the USA Speedo Sectional Championships for the Midwest region in Pleasant Prairie, Wisconsin. During this swim meet, a record-breaking 17 Olympic trial qualifying times were achieved by swimmers.

== Notable members and alumni ==
- Conor Dwyer - Member of US Olympic Swim Team 2012 and 2016
- Matt Grevers - Member of US Olympic Swim Team 2008 and 2012
- Douglas Lennox-Silva - Member of Puerto Rican Olympic Swim Team 2008
- Kristina Lennox-Silva - Member of Puerto Rican Olympic Swim Team 2008
