= Mariama Dalanda Barry =

Guinean taekwondo practitioner

Personal information
- Nationality: Guinea
- Born: 1 April 1991 (age 35) Conakry, Guinea

Sport
- Sport: Taekwondo

Mariama Dalanda Barry (born April 1, 1991 in Conakry) is a Guinean taekwondo practitioner. She competed for the women's welterweight division at the 2008 Summer Olympics in Beijing. Barry was eliminated in the first round, after being defeated by Germany's Helena Fromm, who eventually won the bronze medal in this event, with a score of 1–6.
