= Liya Nurkina =

Kazakhstani taekwondo practitioner

Personal information
- Full name: Liya Asylbekovna Nurkina
- Nationality: Kazakhstan
- Born: 28 September 1984 (age 41) Guryev, Kazakh SSR, Soviet Union
- Height: 1.71 m (5 ft 7 1/2 in)
- Weight: 67 kg (148 lb)

Sport
- Sport: Taekwondo
- Event: 67 kg
Medal record
Women's taekwondo
Representing Kazakhstan
Universiade
Bronze medal – third place	2007 Bangkok	67 kg
World Championships
Bronze medal – third place	2003 Garmisch-Partenkirchen	67 kg

Liya Asylbekovna Nurkina (Kazakh: Лия Асылбековна Нуркина; born September 28, 1984, in Guryev) is a Kazakhstani taekwondo practitioner. She won two bronze medals for the welterweight division at the 2003 World Taekwondo Championships in Garmisch-Partenkirchen, Germany, and at the 2007 Summer Universiade in Bangkok, Thailand.

Nurkina qualified for the women's 67 kg class at the 2008 Summer Olympics in Beijing, after defeating Filipino taekwondo jin Mary Antoinette Rivero in the final match of the Asian Qualification Tournament in Ho Chi Minh City, Vietnam. She lost the preliminary round of sixteen match to France's Gwladys Épangue, who was able to score three points at the end of the game.
