= Farida Azizova =

Azerbaijani taekwondo practitioner

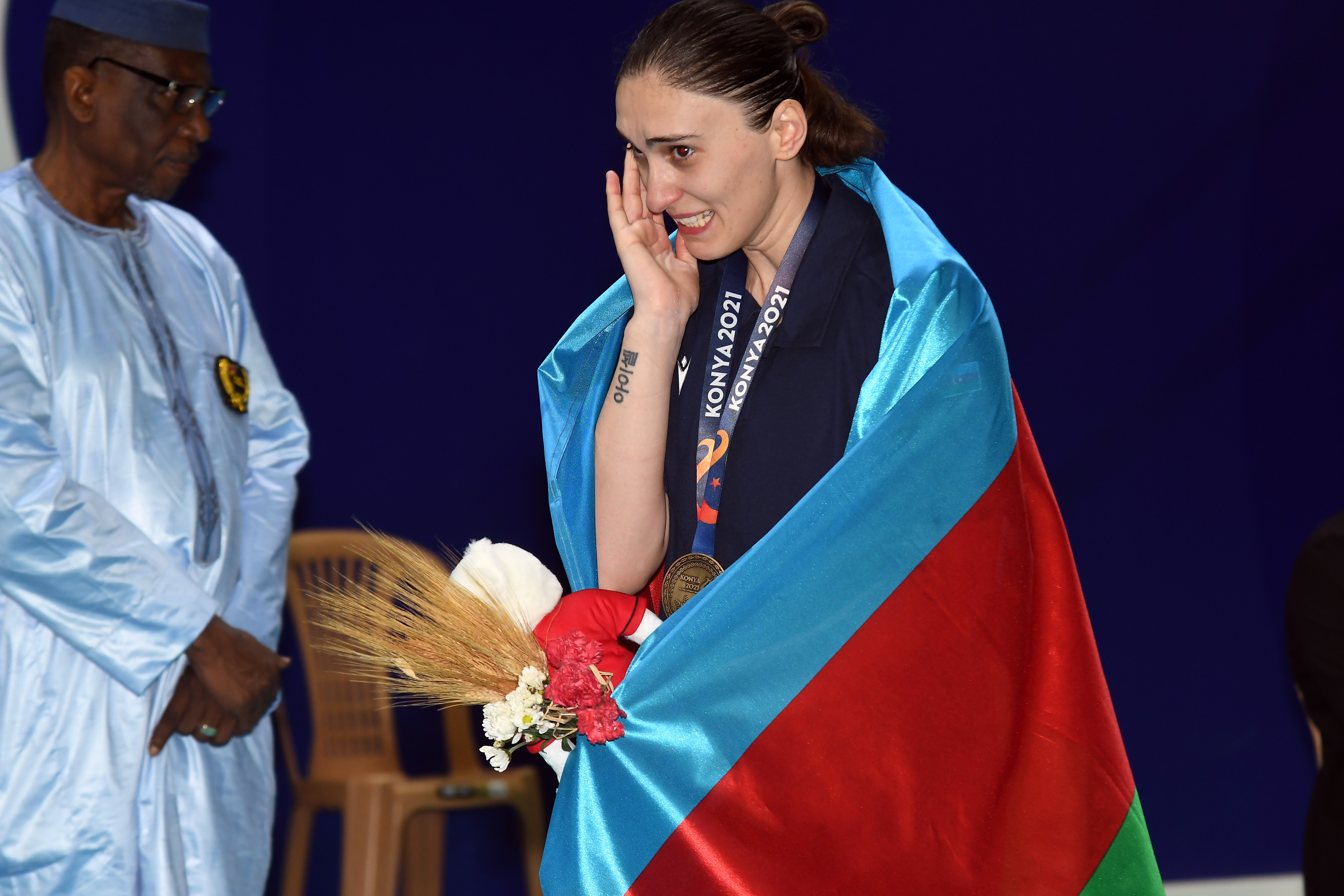

Medal record

Women's taekwondo

Representing Azerbaijan

World Championships
Bronze medal – third place	2013 Puebla	Welterweight
Bronze medal – third place	2019 Manchester	Welterweight

European Championships
Bronze medal – third place	2014 Baku	Welterweight

European Games
Silver medal – second place	2015 Baku	67 kg

Islamic Solidarity Games
Gold medal – first place	2021 Konya	67 kg
Silver medal – second place	2017 Baku	67 kg

Farida Azizova (born 6 June 1995 in Qusar, Azerbaijan) is an Azerbaijani taekwondo practitioner. She competed in the 67 kg event at the 2012 Summer Olympics and was eliminated by Karine Sergerie in the preliminary round. She also competed in the 67 kg event at the 2016 Summer Olympics but lost the Bronze medal match. She has qualified to the 2020 Summer Olympics through the 2021 European Taekwondo Olympic Qualification Tournament.
