= Chuang Chia-chia =

Taiwanese taekwondo practitioner

Medal record

Women's taekwondo

Representing Chinese Taipei

World Championships
Gold medal – first place	2015 Chelyabinsk	Welterweight
Silver medal – second place	2013 Puebla	Welterweight

Asian Games
Bronze medal – third place	2014 Incheon	Lightweight

Asian Championships
Gold medal – first place	2016 Pasay	Welterweight
Gold medal – first place	2014 Tashkent	Lightweight
Silver medal – second place	2012 Ho Chi Minh City	Lightweight
Bronze medal – third place	2010 Astana	Welterweight

World Combat Games
Bronze medal – third place	2010 Beijing	Welterweight

Summer Universiade
Silver medal – second place	2015 Gwangju	67 kg

Chuang Chia-chia (Chinese: 莊佳佳; pinyin: Zhuāng Jiājiā; born 13 May 1989) is a Taiwanese taekwondo practitioner.

Chuang later served as director of the Taoyuan Department of Sports. In March 2019, Chuang disclosed that she had been suspended from competition for a period of two years since 3 October 2017. World Taekwondo Federation records showed that Chuang missed three doping tests in 2017, resulting in her suspension.
