= Douglas Lennox-Silva =

Puerto Rican swimmer (born 1987)

Douglas Lennox
Personal information
- Full name: Douglas Clark Lennox Silva II
- Nickname: Doug
- Nationality: Puerto Rico
- Born: April 10, 1987 (age 39) Fort Lauderdale, Florida, U.S.

Sport
- Sport: Swimming
- Strokes: Freestyle
- Club: Lake Forest Swim Club
- College team: Princeton Tigers

Douglas Lennox-Silva (born April 10, 1987) is a male butterfly swimmer from Puerto Rico, who was born in the United States. He represented Puerto Rico at the 2008 Summer Olympics in Beijing, PR China. He is the younger brother of Kristina Lennox-Silva, who also competed as a swimmer at the 2008 Summer Olympics.

Doug attended Princeton University majoring in anthropology with certificates in American Studies and Latin American Studies.
