= Parisa Farshidi =

Germany taekwondo athlete

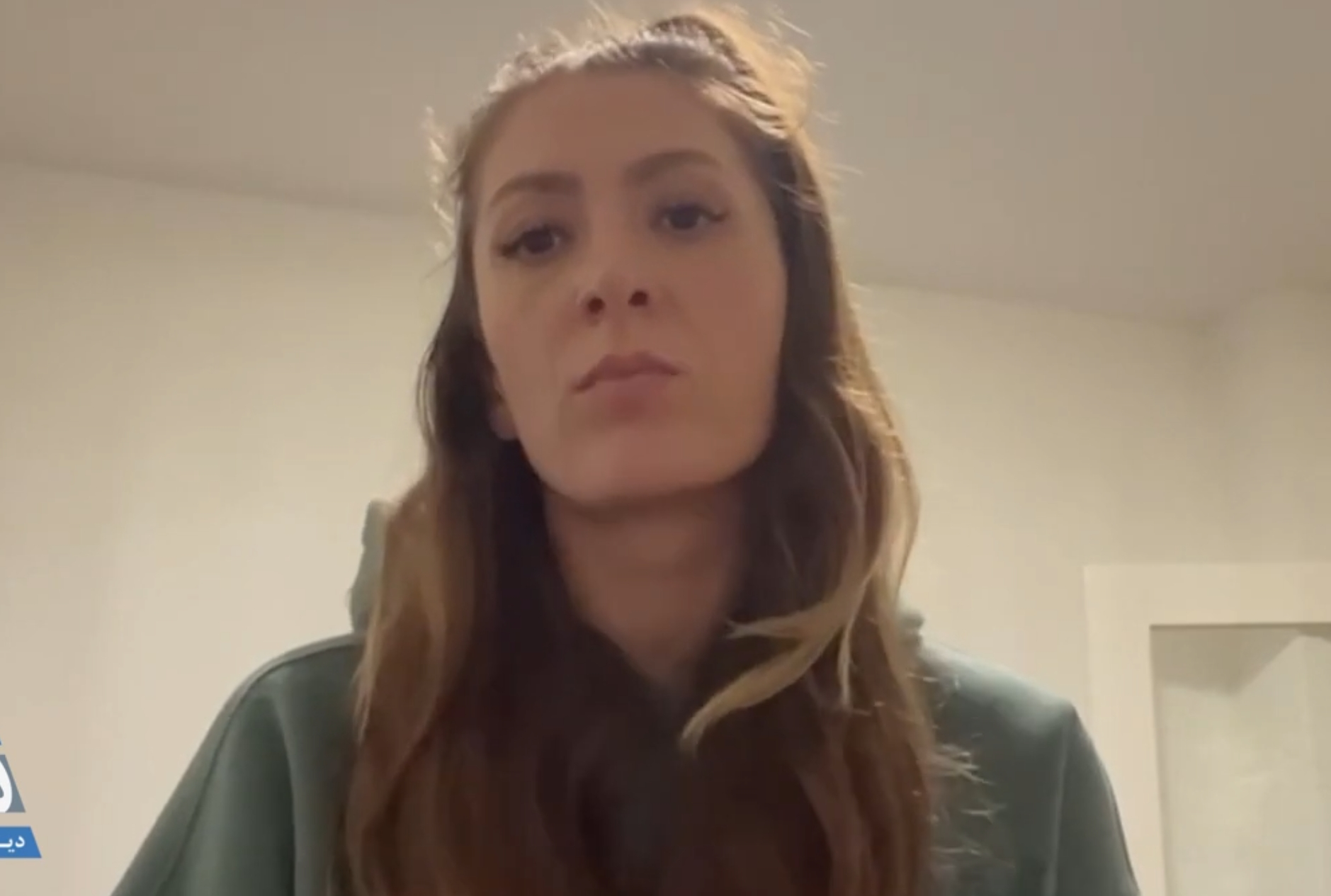

Personal information
- Born: 22 October 1990 (age 35) Tehran, Iran
Medal record
Women's taekwondo
Representing Iran
Asian Games
Silver medal – second place	2010 Guangzhou	67 kg
Representing Iran
Asian Championships
Bronze medal – third place	Kazakhstan, 2010	62 kg

Parisa Farshidi (born 22 October 1990 - Tehran) is a Taekwondo practitioner from Iran.

== Taekwondo ==
As she honors include winning a silver medal weighing 67 kg in the 2010 Asian Games, a bronze medal weighing 67 kg in the 2010 Asian Taekwondo Championship in Kazakhstan and a bronze medal weighing 62 kg in the 2013 Indonesian Islamic Solidarity Games. did The gold medal of the Asian Club Cup and 3 gold medals of the Fajr Cup and the gold medal of the Tunisian tournament in 2013, as well as the captaincy of the national team in 2011 are among his other achievements. She lives in Germany and has applied for asylum in this country.
