= Asunción Ocasio =

Puerto Rican taekwondo practitioner

Personal information
- Full name: Asunción Ocasio Rodríguez
- Nationality: Puerto Rican
- Born: 6 June 1987 (age 39) Boston, Massachusetts
- Height: 1.75 m (5 ft 9 in)
- Weight: 66 kg (146 lb)

Sport
- Sport: Taekwondo
- Event: 67 kg
Medal record
Representing Puerto Rico
Pan American Games
Bronze medal – third place	2007 Rio de Janeiro	-67 kg
Central American and Caribbean Games
Gold medal – first place	2010 Mayaguez	-67 kg

Asunción Ocasio Rodríguez (born June 6, 1987) is a Puerto Rican taekwondo practitioner. Ocasio qualified for the women's 67 kg class at the 2008 Summer Olympics in Beijing, after placing third from the Pan American Qualification Tournament in Cali, Colombia. She defeated Greece's Elisavet Mystakidou and Germany's Helena Fromm in the first two rounds, before losing out the semi-final match by a unanimous decision to Canada's Karine Sergerie, with a score of 0–2. Ocasio automatically qualified for the bronze medal bout, where she narrowly lost Puerto Rico's first ever medal at these Olympic games by Croatia's Sandra Šarić, with a final score of 1–5.
