= Tina Morgan =

Australian taekwondo practitioner

Tina Tanrıkulu
- Born: Tina Michelle Morgan; 10 August 1982 (age 44); Townsville, Australia
- Nationality: Australian
- Style: Taekwondo
- Teachers: Jin-Tae Jeong, Daniel Trenton

Other information
- Occupation: Taekwondo coach
- Spouse: Bahri Tanrıkulu

Tina Michelle Tanrıkulu (née Morgan, born 10 August 1982) is an Australian taekwondo coach and former international competitor. She represented her country at the 2004 and 2008 Summer Olympics, placing fifth in the latter competition. In 2006, Morgan became the first Australian taekwondo competitor to win a World Cup title. She started working as a coach for Turkish taekwondo club Ankaragücü in 2011.

== Early life ==
Morgan was born on 10 August 1982 in Townsville, Queensland, Australia. She moved to Perth as a child and completed her secondary schooling at Woodvale Senior High School. She recalls first having been inspired to become an Olympic athlete when watching the weightlifting competition at the 1988 Summer Olympics. Originally, she had planned to compete in gymnastics, but was told she would grow too tall; she then tried other sports.

In 1994, Morgan was inspired to begin training in taekwondo after watching her brother training in the martial art at the local gymnasium. During her school years, she was also a Western Australian state champion in competitive aerobics, as well as playing football, netball, and tennis.

Morgan earned a tertiary diploma in tourism management in Victoria and a Bachelor of Science degree in psychology from the University of Southern Queensland. At national and international level, she trained in taekwondo at the Western Australian Institute of Sport and the Victorian Institute of Sport. Her Olympic coaches have included Jin-Tae Jeong (from 2002 to 2004) and Daniel Trenton (from 2005 to 2008).

== Competitive taekwondo career ==
Morgan was listed at 173 cm (5 ft 8 in) in height and 64 kg (141 lb) in weight. She competed in the 2004 Summer Olympics in Athens (+67 kg) and the 2008 Summer Olympics in Beijing (–67 kg). Morgan lost her first match in Athens against Brazilian athlete Natália Falavigna da Silva. In 2006, Morgan became the first Australian taekwondo athlete to win a World Cup Title and to be ranked Number 1 in the world in her division.

Morgan managed to qualify for the 2008 Summer Olympics despite sustaining a major knee injury less than a year before Olympic Qualifications, with orthopaedic Surgeon Hayden Morris performing a repair operation using donor tissue to reduce recovery time. The operation involved transplanting a deceased person's patella tendon into Morgan's knee. Her hopes of fighting for a gold medal at the 2008 Summer Olympics were dashed when she lost a third-round match to Canadian Karine Sergerie on decision. Morgan eventually placed fifth after she lost the bronze medal match against French competitor Gwladys Épangue 4–1.

== Post-competition career ==
On 29 January 2009, Morgan married Turkish taekwondo competitor and Olympic silver medallist Bahri Tanrıkulu in Perth. At the time, Morgan said that she was looking forward to coaching future taekwondo competitors.

== See also ==
- Lauren Burns
- Sparring
- World Taekwondo Federation
