= Natalya Mamatova =

Uzbekistani taekwondo practitioner

Personal information
- Full name: Natalya Mamatova
- Nationality: Uzbekistan
- Born: 20 September 1985 (age 41) Tashkent, Uzbek SSR, Soviet Union
- Height: 1.82 m (5 ft 11 1/2 in)
- Weight: 68 kg (150 lb)

Sport
- Sport: Taekwondo
- Event: +67 kg

Natalya Mamatova (née Mikryukova, Uzbek: Наталья Микрюкова; born 20 September 1985) is an Uzbek taekwondo practitioner, who competed in the women's heavyweight category. She became one of the first taekwondo fighters in history to represent Uzbekistan at the 2004 Summer Olympics, and later earned a silver medal in the 67-kg division at the 2006 World Military Championships in Seoul, South Korea.

Mikryukova qualified for an all-female Uzbek taekwondo squad in the women's heavyweight class (+67 kg) at the 2004 Summer Olympics in Athens, by defeating Japan's Yoriko Okamoto for a top spot and granting a berth from the Asian Olympic Qualifying Tournament in Bangkok, Thailand. She failed to move beyond her opening match after falling in a 6–9 defeat to Belgium's Laurence Rase. With her Belgian opponent losing the quarterfinals to Brazil's Natália Falavigna, Mikryukova diminished her hopes to compete for the Olympic bronze medal through the repechage rounds.

She also competed in the +67 kg event at the 2012 Summer Olympics; she was defeated by Anne-Caroline Graffe in the preliminary round and was eliminated by Lee In Jong in the repechage contest.
