= Gulnafis Aitmukhambetova =

Kazakhstani taekwondo practitioner

Gulnafis Aytmukhambetova (born 2 February 1988 in Atyrau) is a Kazakhstani taekwondo practitioner. She competed in the 67 kg event at the 2012 Summer Olympics and was eliminated by Franka Anić in the preliminary round.
