= Haby Niaré =

French taekwondo practitioner

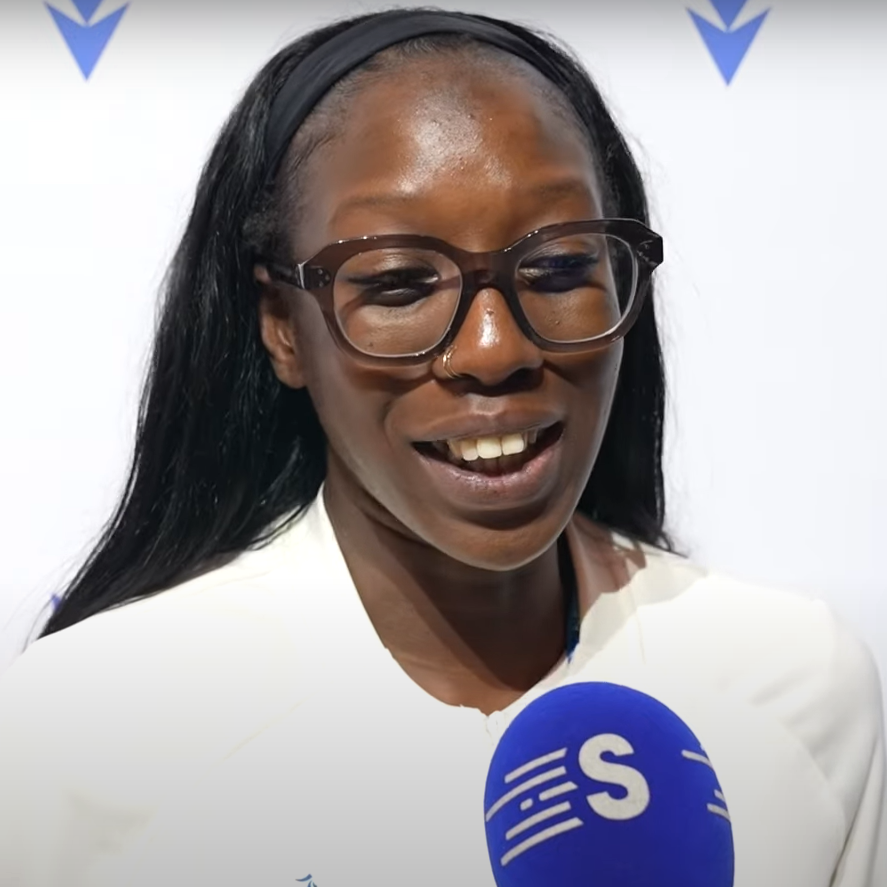
- Niaré in 2024

Personal information
- Born: 26 June 1993 (age 33) Mantes-la-Jolie, France
- Height: 1.76 m (5 ft 9 in)
- Weight: 66 kg (146 lb)
Medal record
Women's taekwondo
Representing France
Olympic Games
| Silver medal – second place | 2016 Rio De Janeiro | 67 kg |
World Championships
| Gold medal – first place | 2013 Puebla | Welterweight |
European Championships
| Gold medal – first place | 2010 St. Petersburg | Lightweight |
| Silver medal – second place | 2012 Manchester | Welterweight |
Mediterranean Games
| Bronze medal – third place | 2013 Mersin | 67 kg |

Haby Niaré (born 26 June 1993 in Mantes-la-Jolie) is a French taekwondo practitioner. Niaré won the gold medal in the women's welterweight (under 67 kg) division at the 2013 World Taekwondo Championships in Puebla.
