= Hwang Kyung-seon =

South Korean taekwondo practitioner

Personal information
- Born: May 21, 1986 (age 40) Namyangju, South Korea

Korean name
- Hangul: 황경선
- Hanja: 黃敬善
- RR: Hwang Gyeongseon
- MR: Hwang Kyŏngsŏn
Medal record
Women's taekwondo
Representing South Korea
Olympic Games
Gold medal – first place	2008 Beijing	–67 kg
Gold medal – first place	2012 London	–67 kg
Bronze medal – third place	2004 Athens	–67 kg
World Championships
Gold medal – first place	2005 Madrid	Welterweight
Gold medal – first place	2007 Beijing	Welterweight
Bronze medal – third place	2011 Gyeongju	Welterweight
Asian Games
Gold medal – first place	2006 Doha	Welterweight

Hwang Kyung-seon (Korean: 황경선; pronounced [hwaŋ.ɡjʌŋ.sʌn], born 21 May 1986) is a South Korean taekwondo practitioner. She represented South Korea at the 2004, 2008 and 2012 Summer Olympics, winning bronze in the former and gold in the latter two.

== Biography ==
Hwang was born on 21 May 1986. She made her international competitive debut at the 2002 World Cup in Tokyo. She then won bronze at the 2004 Summer Olympics in Athens.

In 2008, she won the gold medal in the -67kg category at the Beijing Olympic Games, beating Karine Sergerie of Canada in the final. She won gold once again at the 2012 Summer Olympics in London, defeating Nur Tatar of Turkey.
