= Nikolina Kursar =

Norwegian taekwondo practitioner

Personal information
- Nationality: Norwegian
- Born: 5 August 1991 (age 35)

Sport
- Sport: Taekwondo
Medal record
Representing Norway
Women's taekwondo
World Championships
Bronze medal – third place	2007 Copenhagen	Welterweight

Nikolina Kursar (born 5 August 1991) is a Norwegian taekwondo practitioner. She competed at the 2009 and 2011 World Taekwondo Championships. She won a bronze medal in welterweight at the 2009 World Taekwondo Championships in Copenhagen.
