= Kristina Lennox-Silva =

Puerto Rican swimmer (born 1985)

Personal information
- Full name: Kristina Lennox-Silva
- Nationality: Puerto Rico
- Born: April 24, 1985 (age 41) Fort Lauderdale, Florida, U.S.

Sport
- Sport: Swimming
- Strokes: Freestyle and Butterfly
- Club: Lake Forest Swim Club
- College team: Villanova Wildcats

Kristina Lennox-Silva (born April 24, 1985 in Fort Lauderdale, Florida) is a female freestyle and butterfly swimmer from Puerto Rico, who was born in the United States. During her college career she swam for Villanova University and was a multiple time Big East finalist as well earning her All-Big East status. She represented Puerto Rico at the 2008 Summer Olympics in Beijing, China and 2009 World Aquatics Championships in Rome, Italy. She is the sister of Douglas Lennox-Silva, who also competed as a swimmer at the 2008 Summer Olympics and 2009 World Championships.

Kristina graduated from Villanova University majoring in communications and Spanish.
