= Elvira Efstathiou =

Greek swimmer

Personal information
- Born: Eleftheria Evgenia Efstathiou; 5 July 1989 (age 37) Athens, Greece

Sport
- Sport: Swimming
- Club: Panathinaikos

Eleftheria Evgenia "Elvira" Efstathiou (Greek: Ελευθερία Ευγενία Ευσταθίου; born 5 July 1989) is a Greek swimmer. She competed in the 400 and 800 metre freestyle and 200 metre butterfly at the 2008 Summer Olympics
