= Sandra Šarić =

Croatian taekwondo practitioner

Medal record

Representing Croatia

Women's taekwondo

Olympic Games
Bronze medal – third place	2008 Beijing	67 kg

World Championships
Silver medal – second place	2003 Garmisch	Welterweight
Bronze medal – third place	2005 Madrid	Welterweight
Bronze medal – third place	2007 Beijing	Welterweight
Bronze medal – third place	2009 Copenhagen	Welterweight

European Championships
Gold medal – first place	2008 Rome	Middleweight

Sandra Šarić (born 8 May 1984 in Senj) is a Croatian taekwondo athlete. Representing Croatia at the 2003 World Taekwondo Championships in Garmisch Partenkirchen, Germany, she won the silver medal in the welterweight (-67 kg) division, losing to 2000 Olympic champion Lee Sun-Hee of South Korea in the final. In 2008, she participated in the European Taekwondo Championships in Rome, Italy, and won the gold medal in the middleweight (-72 kg) division.

Šarić represented her country and won the bronze medal in the - 67kg class at the 2008 Beijing Olympics.
