= Seham El-Sawalhy =

Egyptian taekwondo practitioner

Seham El Sawalhy (born 14 April 1991, in Beheira) is an Egyptian taekwondo practitioner. She competed in the 67 kg event at the 2012 Summer Olympics and was eliminated by Elin Johansson in the preliminary round. She competed in the same event at the 2016 Summer Olympics, and was eliminated by Ruth Gbagbi in the first round.
