= Guo Yunfei =

Chinese Taekwondo practitioner

Medal record

Women's taekwondo

Representing China

World Championships
Silver medal – second place	2011 Gyeongju	67 kg

Asian Games
Gold medal – first place	2010 Guangzhou	67 kg
Gold medal – first place	2014 Incheon	67 kg

Guo Yunfei (born June 28, 1991) is a female Chinese Taekwondo practitioner.
