= Franka Anić =

Slovenian-Croatian taekwondo practitioner

Medal record

Representing Slovenia

Women's taekwondo

World Championships
Bronze medal – third place	2013 Puebla	Welterweight

Franka Anić (born 5 February 1991 in Split, Croatia) is a Slovenian-Croatian taekwondo athlete. Anić lives in Korčula, Croatia, but competes internationally for Slovenia.

Anić qualified for the 2012 Summer Olympics in the 67 kg category. She reached the semifinals where she lost to Hwang Kyung-Seon. In the bronze medal match, she lost to Paige McPherson, thus finishing in 5th place in the tournament. She was Slovenia's flagbearer during the closing ceremonies.
