= Elisavet Mystakidou =

Greek taekwondo practitioner

Medal record

Women's taekwondo

Representing Greece

Olympic Games
Silver medal – second place	2004 Athens	67 kg

World Championships
Bronze medal – third place	1993 New York	Heavyweight
Bronze medal – third place	2001 Jeju City	Middleweight
Bronze medal – third place	2003 Garmisch	Welterweight

Elisavet "Elli" Mystakidou (Greek: Ελλη Μυστακίδου; born 14 August 1977 in Giannitsa) is a Greek taekwondo practitioner and Olympic medalist. She participated in the 2004 Summer Olympics in Athens where she earned a silver medal in the under 67 kg division.

Mystakidou also won three bronze medals at the 1993, 2001 and 2003 World Taekwondo Championships. In the 2008 Summer Olympics, she lost her debut against Asunción Ocasio of Puerto Rico.
