= Chu Hoàng Diệu Linh =

Vietnamese Taekwondo practitioner (born 1994)

Personal information
- Full name: Chu Hoàng Diệu Linh
- Nationality: Vietnamese
- Born: 11 January 1994 (age 32) Hanoi, Vietnam

Sport
- Country: Việt Nam
- Sport: Taekwondo

Achievements and titles
- Olympic finals: 2012 London

Chu Hoàng Diệu Linh (born 11 January 1994) is a female Vietnamese Taekwondo practitioner competing for Vietnam at the Summer Olympics 2012 in London in the -67 kg category, after winning a silver medal at the Asian Qualification Tournament. She was a gold medalist in her native country in 2010, and later earned a bronze medal at the 2011 Southeast Asian Games.
