= Karine Sergerie =

Canadian taekwondo practitioner

Personal information
- Nationality: Canadian
- Born: 1 February 1985 (age 41) Sainte-Catherine, Quebec
- Height: 1.65 m (5 ft 5 in)
- Weight: 62 kg (137 lb)

Sport
- Sport: Taekwondo
Medal record
Women's taekwondo
Representing Canada
Summer Olympics
Silver medal – second place	2008 Beijing	67 kg
World Championships
Gold medal – first place	2007 Beijing	Lightweight
Silver medal – second place	2003 Garmisch	Lightweight
Bronze medal – third place	2005 Madrid	Featherweight
Bronze medal – third place	2011 Gyeongju	Lightweight
Pan American Games
Gold medal – first place	2007 Rio de Janeiro	67 kg
- Updated on July 2012

Karine Sergerie (born February 1, 1985) is the 2007 world champion in women's lightweight (under 63 kg) taekwondo. She is Canada's first female world champion in the sport.

== Biography ==
Sergerie was born in Sainte-Catherine, Quebec, Canada. Her father and coach, Rejean, introduced her to karate at age five. She competed in karate from 1992–1998. He continued to coach her when she took an interest in taekwondo after her older brother took up the sport. She is the six-time consecutive national champion (2002–2007). She is also a graduate of Vanier College in Montreal.

== Career ==
Sergerie won a silver medal at the 2003 World Taekwondo Championships. Despite this accomplishment, she did not qualify for the 2004 Summer Olympics because of a "contradiction in the selection process". One set of requirements said she needed to win a gold at the Pan-American Games to qualify, while another one did not. Although she did win a bronze medal at the 2003 Pan-Am Games, the Taekwondo Federation of Canada ruled it was not enough.

Sergerie was part of the three member 2008 Canadian Olympic team at the Summer Olympic Games in Taekwondo along with Ivett Gonda and Sébastien Michaud, and also represented Canada in the 2012 Summer Olympics.

In 2008, Karine advanced to the final where she competed against Hwang Kyung-Seon for the gold medal. Her silver medal is Canada's best Olympic placing in the sport.

=== Career highlights ===
- 2008 Beijing Summer Olympics: Silver
- 2007 World Taekwondo Championships: Gold
- 2007 Pan American Games: Gold
- 2007 Canadian Senior National Championships: Gold
- 2006 Pan American Championships: Gold
- 2006 Commonwealth Taekwondo Championships: Gold
- 2006 Canadian Senior National Championships: Gold
- 2005 World Taekwondo Championships: Bronze
- 2005 Canadian Senior National Championships: Gold
- 2004 Canadian Senior National Championships: Gold
- 2003 World Taekwondo Championships: Silver
- 2003 Canadian Senior National Championships: Gold
- 2002 Canadian Senior National Championships: Gold

=== Awards ===
- 2009 Inducted Into the Official Taekwondo Hall of Fame
- Recipient of the 2005 National Championships Most Valuable Player Award.
- The 2005 Taekwondo Spirit award at the National Championships.
- 2006 Most Valuable Player at the Pan Am Championships.
- 2008 Athlete of the Year by Gala Sports-Québec.
