= Helena Fromm =

German taekwondo practitioner

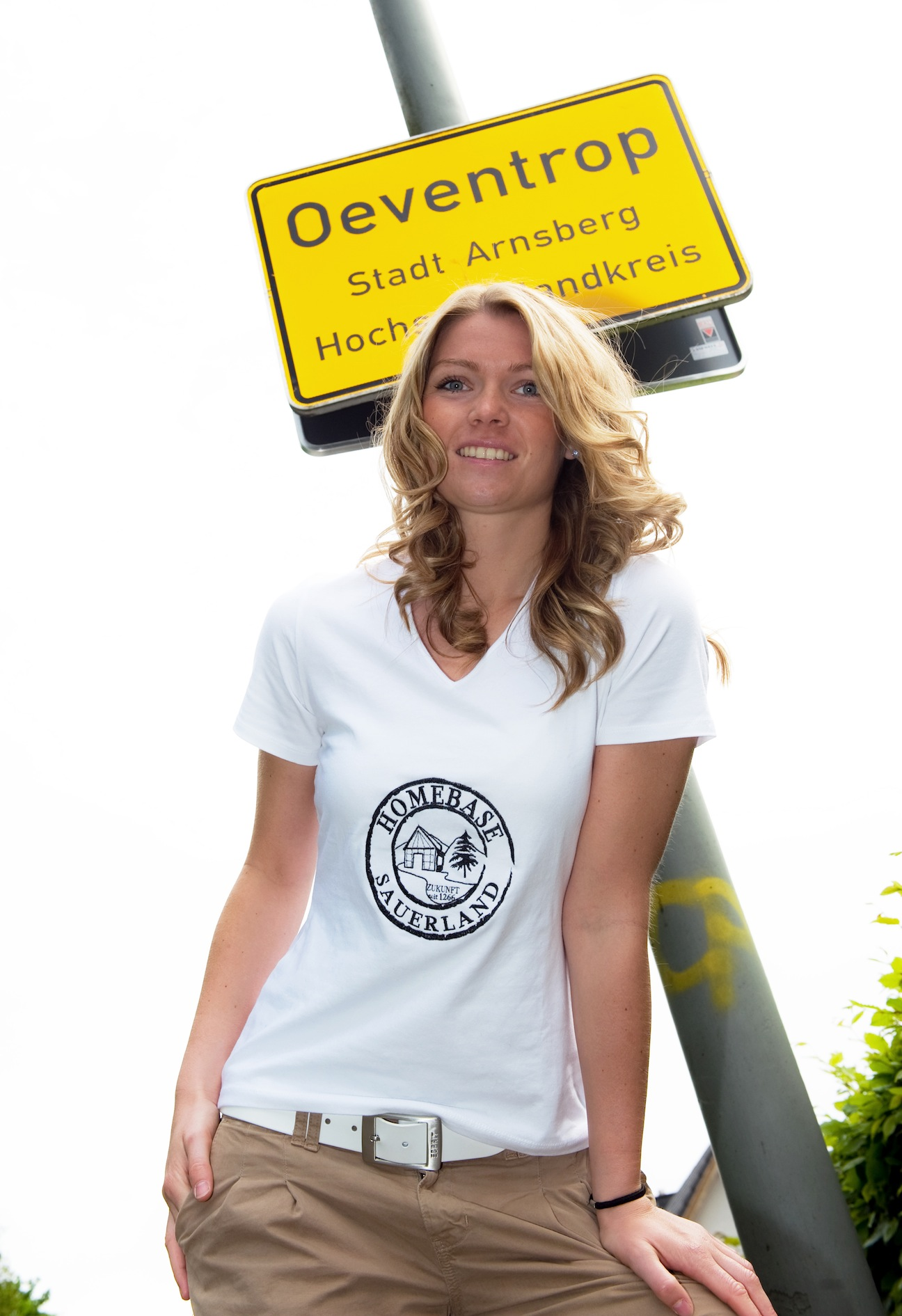
- Fromm in 2012

Medal record

Women's taekwondo

Representing Germany

Olympic Games
Bronze medal – third place	2012 London	67 kg

World Championships
Bronze medal – third place	2007 Beijing	Welterweight
Bronze medal – third place	2011 Gyeongju	Welterweight

European Championships
Gold medal – first place	2008 Rome	Welterweight
Silver medal – second place	2006 Bonn	Lightweight
Bronze medal – third place	2010 Saint Petersburg	Welterweight

Helena Fromm (born 5 August 1987 in Oeventrop, West Germany) is a German taekwondo athlete. Representing Germany at the 2007 World Taekwondo Championships in Beijing, China, she won the bronze medal in the welterweight (–67 kg) division. In 2008, she participated in the European Taekwondo Championships in Rome, Italy, and won the gold medal in the welterweight division, winning over Gwladys Épangue of France in the final.

Fromm represented her country in the –67 kg class at the 2008 Beijing Olympics. Winning her first fight 6–1, before losing to Asunción Ocasio of Puerto Rico by points.

She won the bronze medal at the 2012 Summer Olympics in the women's 67 kg category.
