= Mexico at the 2004 Summer Olympics =

- IOC code: MEX
- NOC: Mexican Olympic Committee
- Website: www.soycom.org (in Spanish)

in Athens
- Competitors: 109 in 20 sports
- Flag bearer: Fernando Platas
- Medals Ranked 59th: Gold 0 Silver 3 Bronze 1 Total 4

Summer Olympics appearances (overview)
- 1900; 1904–1920; 1924; 1928; 1932; 1936; 1948; 1952; 1956; 1960; 1964; 1968; 1972; 1976; 1980; 1984; 1988; 1992; 1996; 2000; 2004; 2008; 2012; 2016; 2020; 2024; 2028

Mexico competed at the 2004 Summer Olympics in Athens, Greece, from 13 to 29 August 2004. This was the nation's twentieth appearance at the Olympics, since its debut in 1900. Comité Olímpico Mexicano sent the nation's largest delegation to the Games since 1992. A total of 109 athletes, 59 men and 50 women, competed in 20 sports. Football was the only team-based sport in which Mexico had its representation in these Olympic Games. There was only a single competitor in fencing, shooting, and weightlifting.

The Mexican team featured three Olympic medalists from Sydney: race walker Noé Hernández, taekwondo jin Víctor Estrada, and diver Fernando Platas, who reprised his role to carry the national flag for the second time in the opening ceremony, after winning the silver in men's springboard. Along with Platas, race walkers Miguel Ángel Rodríguez and Germán Sánchez officially made their fourth Olympic appearance as the most experienced members of the team. Meanwhile, show jumper Gerardo Tazzer, who helped the Mexicans claim the bronze at the 1980 Summer Olympics in Moscow, sought his fourth Olympic bid in Athens after a sixteen-year absence, and was also the oldest athlete of the team at age 52.

Mexico left Athens with a total of four medals (three silver and one bronze), failing to win a gold for the first time since 1996. Half of these medals were awarded to the athletes in taekwondo. Sprinter Ana Guevara set the nation's historical milestone as the first ever female Mexican to claim an Olympic silver medal in track and field. Meanwhile, Belem Guerrero claimed a silver for the first time in the nation's Olympic cycling history, since the 1984 Summer Olympics in Los Angeles, since José Youshimatz took home the bronze in the men's points race.

== Medalists ==
Medal	Name	Sport	Event	Date
Silver	Ana Guevara	Athletics	Women's 400 m	August 24
Silver	Belem Guerrero	Cycling	Women's points race	August 25
Silver	Óscar Salazar	Taekwondo	Men's 58 kg	August 25
Bronze	Iridia Salazar	Taekwondo	Women's 57 kg	August 26

== Archery ==
Three Mexican archers qualified each for the men's individual archery, and a spot for the men's team.

Athlete	Event	Ranking round		Round of 64	Round of 32	Round of 16	Quarterfinals	Semifinals	Final / BM	
Athlete	Event	Score	Seed	Opposition Score	Opposition Score	Opposition Score	Opposition Score	Opposition Score	Opposition Score	Rank
Jorge Pablo Chapoy	Men's individual	645	38	Xue Hf (CHN); L 153–162	Did not advance					
Eduardo Magaña	Men's individual	646	35	Serrano (MEX); L 138–148	Did not advance					
Juan René Serrano	Men's individual	651	30	Magaña (MEX); W 148–138	Galiazzo (ITA); L 163–164	Did not advance				
Jorge Pablo Chapoy; Eduardo Magaña; Juan René Serrano	Men's team	1942	8	—N/a		Netherlands; L 234–244	Did not advance			

== Athletics ==
Mexican athletes have so far achieved qualifying standards in the following athletics events (up to a maximum of 3 athletes in each event at the 'A' Standard, and 1 at the 'B' Standard).

Key

- Note–Ranks given for track events are within the athlete's heat only
- Q = Qualified for the next round
- q = Qualified for the next round as a fastest loser or, in field events, by position without achieving the qualifying target
- NR = National record
- N/A = Round not applicable for the event
- Bye = Athlete not required to compete in round

Men
Track & road events

Athlete	Event	Heat		Quarterfinal		Semifinal		Final	
Athlete	Event	Result	Rank	Result	Rank	Result	Rank	Result	Rank
Alejandro Cardenas	400 m	13:35.32	13	—N/a		45.64	5	Did not advance	
Andrés Espinosa	Marathon	—N/a						2:29:43	69
Mario Iván Flores	50 km walk	—N/a						DNF	
Procopio Franco	Marathon	—N/a						2:23:34	55
David Galván	10000 m	—N/a						29:38.05	21
Noé Hernández	20 km walk	—N/a						DSQ	
José Ernani Palalia	Marathon	—N/a						2:31:41	72
Miguel Ángel Rodríguez	50 km walk	—N/a						3:55:43	15
Germán Sánchez	50 km walk	—N/a						3:58:33	17
Bernardo Segura	20 km walk	—N/a						DNF	
Omar Segura	20 km walk	—N/a						1:24:35	18
Alejandro Suarez	5000 m	15:03.00	7 q	—N/a				Did not advance	
Juan Pedro Toledo	200 m	20.40 NR	=2 Q	20.43	3 Q	20.64	6	Did not advance	
Teodoro Vega	10000 m	—N/a						29:06.55	20

Field events

Athlete	Event	Qualification		Final	
Athlete	Event	Distance	Position	Distance	Position
Giovanni Lanaro	Pole vault	NM	—	Did not advance	

Women
Track & road events

Athlete	Event	Heat		Quarterfinal		Semifinal		Final	
Athlete	Event	Result	Rank	Result	Rank	Result	Rank	Result	Rank
Liliana Allen	100 m	11.42	5 q	11.52	6	Did not advance			
Adriana Fernández	10000 m	—N/a						32:29.57	23
Ana Guevara	400 m	50.93	1 Q	—N/a		50.15	1 Q	49.56	2nd place, silver medalist(s)
Victoria Palacios	20 km walk	—N/a						1:36:07	34
Dulce María Rodríguez	5000 m	16:08.07	16	—N/a				Did not advance	
Angélica Sánchez	Marathon	—N/a						2:49:04	46
Rosario Sánchez	20 km walk	—N/a						DNF	
Margarita Tapia	Marathon	—N/a						2:46:14	38
Liliana Allen; Mayra González; Ana Guevara; Magali Yanez	4 × 400 m relay	3:27.88 NR	5	—N/a				Did not advance	

Field events

Athlete	Event	Qualification		Final	
Athlete	Event	Distance	Position	Distance	Position
Violeta Guzmán	Hammer throw	62.76	36	Did not advance	
Romary Rifka	High jump	1.92	14	Did not advance	

== Boxing ==
Mexico sent five boxers to Athens.

Athlete	Event	Round of 32	Round of 16	Quarterfinals	Semifinals	Final	
Athlete	Event	Opposition Result	Opposition Result	Opposition Result	Opposition Result	Opposition Result	Rank
Raúl Castañeda	Light flyweight	Bye	Kazakov (RUS); L 16–41	Did not advance			
Abner Mares Martínez	Bantamweight	Bedák (HUN); L 27–36	Did not advance				
Juan de Dios Navarro	Light welterweight	Karimzhanov (KAZ); L 31–48	Did not advance				
Alfredo Angulo	Middleweight	Lee (IRL); L 23–38	Did not advance				
Ramiro Reducindo	Light heavyweight	Aripgadjiev (BLR); L 10–29	Did not advance				

== Cycling ==
=== Road ===
Athlete	Event	Time	Rank
Belem Guerrero	Women's road race	3:33:35	46

=== Track ===
Time trial

Athlete	Event	Time	Rank
Nancy Contreras	Women's time trial	34.783	8

Omnium

Athlete	Event	Points	Laps	Rank
Belem Guerrero	Women's points race	14	0	2nd place, silver medalist(s)

== Diving ==
Mexican divers qualified for eight individual spots at the 2004 Olympic Games. Two Mexican synchronized diving teams qualified through the 2004 FINA Diving World Cup.

Men

Athlete	Event	Preliminaries		Semifinals		Final	
Athlete	Event	Points	Rank	Points	Rank	Points	Rank
Fernando Platas	3 m springboard	434.70	8 Q	666.72	8 Q	704.25	5
Rommel Pacheco	3 m springboard	408.75	15 Q	630.60	12 Q	642.69	10
Rommel Pacheco	10 m platform	463.47	5 Q	646.26	7 Q	623.40	10

Women

Athlete	Event	Preliminaries		Semifinals		Final	
Athlete	Event	Points	Rank	Points	Rank	Points	Rank
Paola Espinosa	3 m springboard	301.14	9 Q	506.46	11 Q	490.20	12
Jashia Luna	3 m springboard	252.75	20	Did not advance			
Paola Espinosa	10 m platform	348.03	5 Q	519.21	8 Q	455.40	12
Jashia Luna	10 m platform	328.62	10 Q	481.80	13	Did not advance	
Paola Espinosa; Laura Sánchez	3 m synchronized springboard	—N/a				286.92	5
Paola Espinosa; Jashia Luna	10 m synchronized platform	—N/a				307.74	5

== Equestrian ==
=== Show jumping ===
Athlete	Horse	Event	Qualification								Final					Total	
Athlete	Horse	Event	Round 1		Round 2			Round 3			Round A		Round B			Total	
Athlete	Horse	Event	Penalties	Rank	Penalties	Total	Rank	Penalties	Total	Rank	Penalties	Rank	Penalties	Total	Rank	Penalties	Rank
Federico Fernández	Behomio 8	Individual	9	=54	12	21	=48 Q	17	38	54	Did not advance						
Marcela Lobo Pérez	Joskin	Individual	16	=69	25	41	64 Q	17	58	=58	Did not advance						
Gustavo Ramos Hernández	Minotauro	Individual	19	72	33	52	66 Q	Retired			Did not advance						
Gerardo Tazzer	Chanel	Individual	8	=47	Eliminated			Did not advance									
Federico Fernández; Marcela Lobo Pérez; Gustavo Ramos Hernández; Gerardo Tazzer	See above	Team	—N/a								70	15	Did not advance			70	15

== Fencing ==
Men

Athlete	Event	Round of 64	Round of 32	Round of 16	Quarterfinal	Semifinal	Final / BM	
Athlete	Event	Opposition Score	Opposition Score	Opposition Score	Opposition Score	Opposition Score	Opposition Score	Rank
Edgar Chumacero	Individual foil	Bye	Ota (JPN); L 9–15	Did not advance				

== Football ==
=== Men's tournament ===
Roster

The following is the Mexican squad in the men's football tournament of the 2004 Summer Olympics.

Head coach: (Argentina) Ricardo La Volpe

No.	Pos.	Player	Date of birth (age)	Caps	Goals	2004 club
1	GK	José de Jesús Corona	26 January 1981 (aged 23)	5	0	(Mexican Football Federation) Tecos UAG
2	DF	Francisco Rodríguez	20 October 1981 (aged 22)	5	0	(Mexican Football Federation) Chivas
3	DF	Mario Pérez	17 June 1982 (aged 22)	5	0	(Mexican Football Federation) Necaxa
4	DF	Ismael Rodríguez	10 January 1981 (aged 23)	2	0	(Mexican Football Federation) Monterrey
5	MF	Israel López*	29 September 1974 (aged 29)	0	0	(Mexican Football Federation) Club Toluca
6	DF	Aarón Galindo	8 May 1982 (aged 22)	5	0	(Mexican Football Federation) Cruz Azul
7	MF	Sinha*	23 May 1976 (aged 28)	0	0	(Mexican Football Federation) Club Toluca
8	DF	Diego Martínez	15 February 1981 (aged 23)	5	3	(Mexican Football Federation) Necaxa
9	FW	Omar Bravo*	4 March 1980 (aged 24)	0	0	(Mexican Football Federation) Chivas
10	MF	Luis Ernesto Pérez	12 January 1981 (aged 23)	5	2	(Mexican Football Federation) Monterrey
11	FW	Rafael Márquez Lugo	2 November 1981 (aged 22)	5	3	(Mexican Football Federation) Morelia
12	DF	Gonzalo Pineda	19 October 1982 (aged 21)	3	0	(Mexican Football Federation) Pumas UNAM
13	FW	Sergio Amaury Ponce	13 August 1981 (aged 23)	3	0	(Mexican Football Federation) Club Toluca
14	FW	Juan Pablo García	24 November 1981 (aged 22)	3	1	(Mexican Football Federation) Atlas
15	DF	Hugo Sánchez Guerrero	8 August 1981 (aged 23)	2	0	(Mexican Football Federation) UANL Tigres
16	MF	Ismael Íñiguez	23 July 1981 (aged 23)	3	1	(Mexican Football Federation) Pumas UNAM
17	MF	Gerardo Espinoza	3 October 1981 (aged 22)	5	0	(Mexican Football Federation) Dorados
18	GK	Guillermo Ochoa	13 July 1985 (aged 19)	0	0	(Mexican Football Federation) Club América

* Over-aged player.

Group play

Pos	Team	Pld	W	D	L	GF	GA	GD	Pts	Qualification
1	Mali	3	1	2	0	5	3	+2	5	Qualified for the quarterfinals
2	South Korea	3	1	2	0	6	5	+1	5	Qualified for the quarterfinals
3	Mexico	3	1	1	1	3	3	0	4	
4	Greece	3	0	1	2	4	7	−3	1	

11 August 2004
20:30

Mali	0 – 0	Mexico
	Report

Panthessaliko Stadium, Volos
Attendance: 10,104
Referee: Subkhiddin Mohd Salleh (Malaysia)

14 August 2004
20:30

South Korea	1 – 0	Mexico
Kim J.W. 16'	Report

Karaiskaki Stadium, Piraeus
Attendance: 14,026
Referee: Claus Bo Larsen (Denmark)

17 August 2004
20:30

Greece	2 – 3	Mexico
Taralidis 82' (pen.); Stoltidis 90+3'	Report	Márquez 47'; Bravo 70', 86'

Panthessaliko Stadium, Volos
Attendance: 21,597
Referee: Divine Evehe (Cameroon)

=== Women's tournament ===
Roster

Head coach: Leonardo Cuéllar

Mexico named a squad of 18 players and 3 alternates for the tournament.

No.	Pos.	Player	Date of birth (age)	Caps	Goals	Club
1	GK	Jennifer Molina	27 June 1981 (aged 23)			(United States Soccer Federation) Colgate University
2	DF	Elizabeth Gómez	21 September 1981 (aged 22)			(United States Soccer Federation) University of Miami
3	DF	Marlene Sandoval	18 January 1984 (aged 20)			(United States Soccer Federation) California State University
4	DF	Mónica González (captain)	10 October 1978 (aged 25)			(United States Soccer Federation) Boston Breakers
5	DF	María de Jesús Castillo	6 July 1983 (aged 21)			(Mexican Football Federation) Palomas
6	MF	Mónica Vergara	2 May 1983 (aged 21)			(Mexican Football Federation) Andreas Soccer
7	MF	Evelyn López	25 December 1978 (aged 25)			(Mexican Football Federation) Necaxa
8	MF	Fátima Leyva	14 February 1980 (aged 24)			(Mexican Football Federation) Santos Laguna
9	FW	Maribel Domínguez	18 November 1978 (aged 25)			(United States Soccer Federation) Atlanta Beat
10	FW	Iris Mora	22 September 1981 (aged 22)			(United States Soccer Federation) UC Los Angeles
11	MF	Patricia Pérez	17 December 1978 (aged 25)			(Mexican Football Federation) Chivas Tijuana
12	DF	Carina Maravillas	22 June 1983 (aged 21)			(Mexican Football Federation) Palomas
13	MF	Luz Saucedo	14 December 1983 (aged 20)			Unattached
14	DF	Nancy Gutiérrez	2 June 1987 (aged 17)			(United States Soccer Federation) Arsenal Soccer
15	MF	Dioselina Valderrama	28 April 1984 (aged 20)			(Mexican Football Federation) Bonita Rebel
16	FW	Alma Martínez	22 September 1981 (aged 22)			(United States Soccer Federation) UC Santa Barbara
17	FW	Lupita Worbis	12 December 1983 (aged 20)			(Mexican Football Federation) Rogers Soccer
18	GK	Pamela Tajonar	3 December 1984 (aged 19)			Unattached

Group play

Pos	Team	Pld	W	D	L	GF	GA	GD	Pts	Qualification
1	Germany	2	2	0	0	10	0	+10	6	Qualified for the quarterfinals
2	Mexico	2	0	1	1	1	3	−2	1	Qualified for the quarterfinals
3	China	2	0	1	1	1	9	−8	1	

August 14, 2004
18:00

China	1 – 1	Mexico
Ji 34'	Report	Domínguez 11'

Pampeloponnisiako Stadium, Patras
Attendance: 5.112
Referee: Ionescu (Romania)

August 17, 2004
18:00

Germany	2 – 0	Mexico
Wimbersky 20'; Prinz 79'	Report

Karaiskaki Stadium, Piraeus
Attendance: 26.338
Referee: Szokolaia (Hungary)

Quarterfinals

August 20, 2004
21:00

Mexico	0 – 5	Brazil
	Report	Cristiane 25', 49'; Formiga 29', 54'; Marta 60'

Pankritio Stadium, Heraklio
Attendance: 3.012
Referee: Gaye (Senegal)

== Gymnastics ==
=== Artistic ===
Women

Athlete	Event	Qualification						Final					
Athlete	Event	Apparatus				Total	Rank	Apparatus				Total	Rank
Athlete	Event	V	UB	BB	F	Total	Rank	V	UB	BB	F	Total	Rank
Brenda Magaña	All-around	9.200	8.575	7.625	8.487	33.887	58	Did not advance					
Laura Moreno	Floor	—N/a			7.700	7.700	82	Did not advance					
Laura Moreno	Uneven bars	—N/a	8.512	—N/a		8.512	72	Did not advance					
Laura Moreno	Balance beam	—N/a		8.575	—N/a	8.575	63	Did not advance					

== Judo ==
Three Mexican judoka (two men and one woman) qualified for the 2004 Summer Olympics.

Athlete	Event	Round of 32	Round of 16	Quarterfinals	Semifinals	Repechage 1	Repechage 2	Repechage 3	Final / BM	
Athlete	Event	Opposition Result	Opposition Result	Opposition Result	Opposition Result	Opposition Result	Opposition Result	Opposition Result	Opposition Result	Rank
Cristobal Aburto	Men's −60 kg	Fernández (CRC); W 0002–0000	Albarracín (ARG); L 0002–1000	Did not advance						
José Goldschmied	Men's −90 kg	Demontfaucon (FRA); L 0000–1010	Did not advance							
Vanessa Zambotti	Women's +78 kg	Bozhilova (BUL); W 1010–0000	Andolina (ITA); L 0000–1021	Did not advance						

== Modern pentathlon ==
Two Mexican athletes qualified to compete in the modern pentathlon event through the 2003 Pan American Games in Santo Domingo, Dominican Republic.

Athlete	Event	Shooting (10 m air pistol)			Fencing (épée one touch)			Swimming (200 m freestyle)			Riding (show jumping)			Running (3000 m)			Total points	Final rank
Athlete	Event	Points	Rank	MP Points	Results	Rank	MP points	Time	Rank	MP points	Penalties	Rank	MP points	Time	Rank	MP Points	Total points	Final rank
Manuel Pradillo	Men's	178	15	1072	15–16	=15	804	2:07.07	11	1276	168	19	1032	9:57.68	13	1012	5196	12
Sergio Salazar	Men's	172	=23	1000	16–15	=11	832	2:07.27	13	1276	112	14	1088	9:59.15	14	1004	5200	11

== Rowing ==
Mexican rowers qualified the following boats:

Women

Athlete	Event	Heats		Repechage		Semifinals		Final	
Athlete	Event	Time	Rank	Time	Rank	Time	Rank	Time	Rank
Martha García	Single sculls	8:07.32	5 R	7:35.55	1 SA/B	8:04.83	5 FB	7:43.44	12
Gabriela Huerta; Aline Olvera	Lightweight double sculls	7:18.16	6 R	7:23.07	5 FC	Bye		7:48.02	16

Qualification Legend: FA=Final A (medal); FB=Final B (non-medal); FC=Final C (non-medal); FD=Final D (non-medal); FE=Final E (non-medal); FF=Final F (non-medal); SA/B=Semifinals A/B; SC/D=Semifinals C/D; SE/F=Semifinals E/F; QF=Quarterfinals; R=Repechage

== Sailing ==
Mexican sailors have qualified one boat for each of the following events.

Men

Athlete	Event	Race											Net points	Final rank
Athlete	Event	1	2	3	4	5	6	7	8	9	10	M*	Net points	Final rank
David Mier	Mistral	11	15	12	19	11	14	19	5	16	20	~~26~~	142	16

Women

Athlete	Event	Race											Net points	Final rank
Athlete	Event	1	2	3	4	5	6	7	8	9	10	M*	Net points	Final rank
Rosa Irene Campos	Mistral	23	~~25~~	23	22	18	24	22	22	21	24	21	220	23
Tania Elías Calles	Europe	6	5	15	17	6	3	16	~~OCS~~	5	14	11	98	12

M = Medal race; OCS = On course side of the starting line; DSQ = Disqualified; DNF = Did not finish; DNS= Did not start; RDG = Redress given

== Shooting ==
One Mexican shooter qualified to compete in the following events:

Men

Athlete	Event	Qualification		Final	
Athlete	Event	Points	Rank	Points	Rank
Roberto José Elias	10 m air rifle	582	44	Did not advance	
Roberto José Elias	50 m rifle 3 positions	1137	=36	Did not advance	

== Swimming ==
Mexican swimmers earned qualifying standards in the following events (up to a maximum of 2 swimmers in each event at the A-standard time, and 1 at the B-standard time):

Men

Athlete	Event	Heat		Semifinal		Final	
Athlete	Event	Time	Rank	Time	Rank	Time	Rank
Joshua Ilika Brenner	200 m freestyle	1:51.66	28	Did not advance			
Joshua Ilika Brenner	100 m butterfly	54.29	33	Did not advance			
Leonardo Salinas Saldana	400 m freestyle	3:58.36	29	—N/a		Did not advance	
Juan Veloz	200 m butterfly	1:58.32	13 Q	1:59.78	16	Did not advance	
Javier Díaz; Joshua Ilika Brenner; Alejandro Siqueiros; Leonardo Salinas Saldana	4 × 200 m freestyle relay	7:29.54 NR	15	—N/a		Did not advance	

Women

Athlete	Event	Heat		Semifinal		Final	
Athlete	Event	Time	Rank	Time	Rank	Time	Rank
Adriana Marmolejo	100 m breaststroke	1:14.35	38	Did not advance			
Adriana Marmolejo	200 m breaststroke	2:36.10	27	Did not advance			

== Synchronized swimming ==
Two Mexican synchronized swimmers qualified a spot in the women's duet.

Athlete	Event	Technical routine		Free routine (preliminary)			Free routine (final)		
Athlete	Event	Points	Rank	Points	Total (technical + free)	Rank	Points	Total (technical + free)	Rank
Nara Falcón; Olga Vargas	Duet	42.667	17	43.417	86.084	16	Did not advance		

== Taekwondo ==
Three Mexican taekwondo jin qualified for the following events.

Athlete	Event	Round of 16	Quarterfinals	Semifinals	Repechage 1	Repechage 2	Final / BM	
Athlete	Event	Opposition Result	Opposition Result	Opposition Result	Opposition Result	Opposition Result	Opposition Result	Rank
Óscar Salazar	Men's −58 kg	Mercedes (DOM); W 10–1	Shaposhnyk (UKR); W 6–2	Nguyen (VIE); W 8–0	Bye		Chu M-Y (TPE); L 1–5	2nd place, silver medalist(s)
Víctor Estrada	Men's −80 kg	Matos (CUB); W 8–7	López (USA); L 2–4	Did not advance	Rasheed (IRQ); W WO	Ahmadov (AZE); L 9–9 SUP	Did not advance	5
Iridia Salazar	Women's −57 kg	Delgado (COL); W 5–2	Kaydashova (UZB); W 7–7 SUP	Jang J-W (KOR); L 1–2	Bye	Corsi (ITA); W 3–2	Reyes (ESP); W 2–1	3rd place, bronze medalist(s)

== Triathlon ==
Two Mexican triathletes qualified for the following events.

Athlete	Event	Swim (1.5 km)	Trans 1	Bike (40 km)	Trans 2	Run (10 km)	Total Time	Rank
Eligio Cervantes	Men's	18:44	0:18	1:05:12	0:21	35:31	1:59:27.81	38
Javier Rosas	Men's	18:43	0:18	1:09:21	0:20	35:59	2:04:03.97	44

== Volleyball ==
=== Beach ===
Athlete	Event	Preliminary round	Standing	Round of 16	Quarterfinals	Semifinals	Final	
Athlete	Event	Opposition Score	Standing	Opposition Score	Opposition Score	Opposition Score	Opposition Score	Rank
Mayra García; Hilda Gaxiola	Women's	Pool F Karantasiou – Sfyri (GRE); L 0 – 2 (17–21, 13–21); Tian J – Wang F (CHN); L 0 – 2 (19–21, 15–21); Lochowicz – Pottharst (AUS); L 0 – 2 (24–26, 20–22)	4	Did not advance				

== Weightlifting ==
Mexico has qualified a single weightlifter.

Athlete	Event	Snatch		Clean & Jerk		Total	Rank
Athlete	Event	Result	Rank	Result	Rank	Total	Rank
Damaris Aguirre	Women's −75 kg	100	=12	122.5	12	222.5	12

== See also ==
- Mexico at the 2003 Pan American Games
- Mexico at the 2004 Summer Paralympics
