= Marcel Wenceslau =

Brazilian taekwondo practitioner

Marcel Ferreira
Personal information
- Full name: Marcel Wenceslau Ferreira
- Nationality: Brazil
- Born: 17 January 1981 (age 45) São Paulo, Brazil
- Height: 1.63 m (5 ft 4 in)
- Weight: 58 kg (128 lb)

Sport
- Sport: Taekwondo
- Event: 58 kg
Medal record
Men's taekwondo
Representing Brazil
World Championships
Bronze medal – third place	2007 Beijing	62 kg

Marcel Wenceslau Ferreira (born January 17, 1981, in São Paulo) is a Brazilian taekwondo practitioner, who competed in the men's flyweight category. He pocketed both a Pan American and South American titles in his own division, picked up a bronze medal at the 2007 World Taekwondo Championships in Beijing, China, and represented his nation Brazil at the 2004 Summer Olympics. Ferreira is also the elder brother of taekwondo jin Márcio Wenceslau, who later competed in the same category at the 2008 Summer Olympics in Beijing.

Ferreira qualified for the Brazilian squad in the men's flyweight class (58 kg) at the 2004 Summer Olympics in Athens, by granting a berth and placing second behind Mexico's Óscar Salazar from the Pan American Olympic Qualifying Tournament in Querétaro. Ferreira lost his opening match 2–10 to Egyptian fighter and eventual bronze medalist Tamer Bayoumi. With Bayoumi being beaten by Chinese Taipei's Chu Mu-yen in the semifinal, Ferreira denied his chance to compete for the Olympic bronze medal through the repechage.

In 2007, Ferreira emerged powerfully to pick up the bronze medal over Thailand's Nacha Puntong in the 62-kg division at the World Championships in Beijing, China.
