= Taekwondo at the 2004 Summer Olympics – Men's 58 kg =

Taekwondo competition

Men's 58 kg at the Games of the XXVIII Olympiad
- Venue: Faliro Coastal Zone Olympic Complex
- Date: 26 August
- Competitors: 16 from 16 nations

Medalists
1st place, gold medalist(s)		Chu Mu-Yen	Chinese Taipei
2nd place, silver medalist(s)		Óscar Salazar	Mexico
3rd place, bronze medalist(s)		Tamer Bayoumi	Egypt

The men's 58 kg competition in taekwondo at the 2004 Summer Olympics in Athens took place on August 26 at the Faliro Coastal Zone Olympic Complex.

Chu Mu-yen collected one of Chinese Taipei's first ever Olympic gold medals at these Games in the event after beating Mexico's Óscar Salazar 5–1 in their final match. Meanwhile, the bronze medal was awarded to Egyptian fighter Tamer Bayoumi, who easily thwarted Spain's Juan Antonio Ramos in the repechage final 7–1. Despite high hopes, Greece's home favorite Michalis Mouroutsos missed his Olympic title defense after losing the quarterfinal match 2–8 to Bayoumi.

== Competition format ==
The main bracket consisted of a single elimination tournament, culminating in the gold medal match. The taekwondo fighters eliminated in earlier rounds by the two finalists of the main bracket advanced directly to the repechage tournament. These matches determined the bronze medal winner for the event.

== Schedule ==
All times are Greece Standard Time (UTC+2)

Date	Time	Round
Thursday, 26 August 2004	11:00; 16:00; 17:30; 20:30	Preliminary Round; Quarterfinals; Semifinals; Final

== Results ==
Legend

- PTG — Won by points gap
- SUP — Won by superiority
- OT — Won on over time (Golden Point)
- WO — Walkover

=== Main bracket ===
Preliminary round
Tamer Bayoumi (EGY)	10
Marcel Ferreira (BRA)	2
Ussadate Sutthikunkarn (THA)	2
Michalis Mouroutsos (GRE)	5
Ezedin Belgasem (LBA)	1:15-1
Chu Mu-Yen (TPE)	RSC
Tshomlee Go (PHI)	6
Juan Antonio Ramos (ESP)	7
Satriyo Rahadhani (INA)	5
Paul Green (GBR)	6
Seyfula Magomedov (RUS)	10
Nguyen Quoc Huan (VIE)	12
Oleksandr Shaposhnyk (UKR)	7
Akram Abdullah (YEM)	5
Óscar Salazar (MEX)	10
Gabriel Mercedes (DOM)	1

Second round
Tamer Bayoumi (EGY)	8
Michalis Mouroutsos (GRE)	2
Chu Mu-Yen (TPE)	9
Juan Antonio Ramos (ESP)	1
Paul Green (GBR)	2
Nguyen Quoc Huan (VIE)	4
Oleksandr Shaposhnyk (UKR)	2
Óscar Salazar (MEX)	6

Semifinals
Tamer Bayoumi (EGY)	4
Chu Mu-Yen (TPE)	5
Nguyen Quoc Huan (VIE)	0
Óscar Salazar (MEX)	8

Gold medal match
Chu Mu-Yen (TPE)	5
Óscar Salazar (MEX)	1

=== Repechage ===
Quarterfinals
Oleksandr Shaposhnyk (UKR)
Gabriel Mercedes (DOM)	WO
Juan Antonio Ramos (ESP)	WO
Ezedin Belgasem (LBA)

Semifinals
Tamer Bayoumi (EGY)	WO
Gabriel Mercedes (DOM)
Nguyen Quoc Huan (VIE)	0
Juan Antonio Ramos (ESP)	8

Bronze medal match
Tamer Bayoumi (EGY)	7
Juan Antonio Ramos (ESP)	1
