= Eddie Lim Yit Min =

Malaysian Taekwondo athlete and entrepreneur

- 义铭
- Born: 7 February 1985 (age 41)
- Website: instagram.com/eddie_lym, facebook.com/EddieLYM

Eddie Lim Yit Min (Chinese: 林义铭; born 7 February 1985) is a Malaysian national Taekwondo athlete and entrepreneur.

Lim began training in Taekwondo from the age of eight and became the national champion at 11 years old. Lim was the only Malaysian in the men’s category to win a gold medal in the 22nd Southeast Asian (SEA) Games in Vietnam in 2003 and became the youngest Malaysian male to win a gold medal in the SEA Games for Malaysia at that time, at 18 years of age.

He graduated from his secondary School SMK Kepong Baru in 2002 and turned down two full scholarships to further his study immediately. After retiring from the national Taekwondo team in 2004, he resumed his tertiary education pursuits and subsequently completed his degree in finance at HELP University under a full scholarship.

Lim is currently the Head of the Youth Bureau under the ASEAN Retailers and Franchise Federation, an association heavily invested in promoting the economy and development of trade across various industries within the ASEAN and beyond.

== Early years ==
Lim was born on 7 February 1985, to Lim Yiew Tan and Yap Hoing Wah and is the elder child of two. His mother worked in the insurance industry for 35 years until she retires in April 2020 as an Assistant Manager in Marketing for an insurance company.

Lim’s father worked in the banking industry until he retired as a Bank Officer in 2000.

Eddie was an active child, playing many sports during his schooling years, including football, badminton, and hockey. He took up Taekwondo at the age of eight and became the national junior champion in a Poomsae (demonstration) event at the age of 11 before moving on to the more competitive Kyorugi（sparring）events at the age of 13.

== Career ==
=== Sports ===
Lim became the national junior champion at the age of 11 in a Poomsae (demonstration) event. At 13 years old, he made the transition to the more competitive Kyorugi (sparring) events. He won his first major national junior title in the National Youth Taekwondo Championship in 1999.

At 16, he officially became a member of the national junior team under the Malaysia Taekwondo Association. In 2001, Lim won his first international medal in the 1st Asian Junior Taekwondo Championships in Taiwan with a bronze medal.

The following year, at 17 years old, he won the only gold medal for Malaysia in the 5th International Taekwondo Korean Open Championships. He also became the first and only Malaysian to win the coveted Most Valuable Player (MVP) Award in the same tournament, selected from a field of over 1,500 athletes worldwide. Lim also represented Malaysia in the World Taekwondo Junior Championships held in Greece.

After his transition into the national senior team, he was selected as one of only four Malaysians to make the cut for both the Regional and World Qualifiers for the Athens Olympic Games.

Lim was the only Malaysian in the men’s category to win a gold medal in the 22nd Southeast Asian Games in Vietnam in 2003 during his debut for the Games. Despite being the youngest participant in his weight class, he defeated two Olympians – Ussadate Sutthikunkarn of Thailand and Nguyen Quoc Huan of Vietnam. He became the youngest Malaysian male to win a gold medal in the SEA Games for Malaysia at that time, at 18 years of age.

Due to his contribution to the martial art, he was presented with the Malaysia Taekwondo Association’s Year 2001 “Most Promising Player” Award and was also nominated to be the National Olympian of the Year 2004.

Due to his love for the sports, and commitment to represent Malaysia in the national Taekwondo team, Lim did not immediately pursue his tertiary education upon his graduation from his secondary school SMK Kepong Baru in 2002. He turned down the prestigious ASEAN Scholarship and another full scholarship from a local university.

== Career highlights ==
=== International ===
Year	Tournament	Category	Medal
2001	1st Asian Junior Taekwondo Championships, Taiwan	Under 55 kg	Bronze
2002	Kyonggi International Open Taekwondo Championships, Korea	Under 55 kg	Bronze
2002	5th International Taekwondo Korea Open Championships	Under 55 kg	Gold
2002	World Taekwondo Junior Championships, Greece	Under 55 kg	Quarter Finalist
2003	2nd LG-Vietnam Taekwondo Open	Under 58 kg	Bronze
2003	22nd Southeast Asian Games, Vietnam	Under 58 kg	Gold

=== National ===
Year	Tournament	Category	Medal
1999	National Youth Taekwondo Championship	48–51 kg	Gold
1999	National Inter-club Taekwondo Championships	48–51 kg	Gold
2000	National Inter-club Taekwondo Championships	51–55 kg	Gold
2001	National Youth Taekwondo Championship	51–55 kg	Gold
2008	Selangor Invitational Taekwondo Championships	Under 58 kg	Gold
2008	National Taekwondo Tournament	Under 58 kg	Gold
2008	MTF National Taekwondo Tournament	Under 58 kg	Gold
2008	National Inter-club Taekwondo Tournament	Under 58 kg	Gold
2009	MAPCU Taekwondo Tournament	Under 58 kg	Gold
2009	MAPCU Taekwondo Tournament	Poomsae (Men’s Individual)	Gold

== Life after sports ==
In 2004, after retiring from the national Taekwondo team, Lim decided to resume his tertiary education pursuits. He subsequently completed his degree in finance at HELP University under a full scholarship.

Lim founded Youth World Development Sdn Bhd (Yourth World), a company involved primarily in youth development programs to unleash the potential in youths. In just 8 months, the company received a nomination for the 2010 Asian Youth Ambassadors Awards under the Youth Friendly Company of the Year Category and eventually making it to the top three companies shortlisted for the award.

In 2017, Youth World was also awarded the ASEAN Outstanding Business Awards under the Outstanding Education Campaign Category. Lim received the award from the then Minister of Urban Wellbeing, Housing, and Local Government, Yang Berhormat Tan Sri Noh bin Haji Omar. The awards ceremony was organized by the ASEAN Retail Chains and Franchise Federatio n (ARFF).

In 2019, Lim was appointed as the Deputy Head of the Youth Bureau under the ARFF to lead the formation of the bureau and to assist the federation in its work to champion the promotion and development of retail chains, franchise, tourism and shopping industries within the 10 ASEAN countries and beyond.

Apart from his duties at Youth World and the ARFF, Lim is also a speaker and trainer in the field of personal safety and self-defence. His work has been featured in various newspapers, television programs, and radio stations.
