= Aleksandra Uścińska =

Polish taekwondo practitioner

Personal information
- Full name: Aleksandra Uścińska
- Nationality: Poland
- Born: 2 December 1984 (age 41) Poznań, Poland
- Height: 1.66 m (5 ft 5 1/2 in)
- Weight: 57 kg (126 lb)

Sport
- Sport: Taekwondo
- Event: 57 kg
- Club: KS Rapid Srem
- Coached by: Robert Sadurski

Aleksandra Uścińska (born December 2, 1984) is a Polish taekwondo practitioner, who competed in the women's featherweight category. She picked up a total of thirteen medals in her taekwondo career, including a silver from the World Junior Championships in Killarney, Ireland, and represented her nation Poland at the 2004 Summer Olympics. Uscinska also trained as a member of the taekwondo squad for Rapid Srem Sports Club (Polish: Klub Sportowy Rapid Srem) in her native Poznań, under head coach and master Robert Sadurski.

Uscinska qualified as a lone taekwondo fighter for the Polish squad in the women's featherweight class (57 kg) at the 2004 Summer Olympics in Athens, by placing third and granting a berth from the European Olympic Qualifying Tournament in Baku, Azerbaijan. Having a lack of international experience in the sport, Uscinska endured her first-round defeat 2–11 to Spain's Sonia Reyes. With her Spanish opponent narrowly losing the quarterfinals to South Korea's Jang Ji-won, Uscinska withered her hopes to compete for the Olympic bronze medal through the repechage.
