= Cristiana Corsi =

Italian taekwondo practitioner

Personal information
- Full name: Cristiana Corsi
- Nationality: Italy
- Born: 23 April 1976 Rome, Italy
- Died: 22 February 2016 (aged 39) Rome, Italy
- Height: 1.70 m (5 ft 7 in)
- Weight: 57 kg (126 lb)

Sport
- Sport: Taekwondo
- Event: 57 kg
- Club: Centro TDK Roma
- Coached by: Park Young-Gil
Medal record
Women's taekwondo
Representing Italy
Summer Universiade
Silver medal – second place	2003 Daegu	59 kg
European Championships
Gold medal – first place	2002 Samsun	59 kg
Bronze medal – third place	2004 Lillehammer	59 kg
Bronze medal – third place	2008 Rome	59 kg

Cristiana Corsi (23 April 1976, in Rome – 22 February 2016) was an Italian taekwondo practitioner, who competed in the women's featherweight category. Considered one of Italy's top taekwondo players of her decade, Corsi obtained a total of nine medals in her sporting career, including a gold at the 2002 European Championships in Samsun, Turkey, and a silver in the 59-kg division at the 2003 Summer Universiade in Daegu, South Korea. Corsi was also selected to compete for the Italian taekwondo squad in two editions of the Olympic Games (2000 and 2004), where she obtained a fifth-place finish in the women's featherweight category (57 kg) on each edition. Throughout her sporting career, Corsi trained for Rome Taekwondo Centre (Italian: Centro TDK Roma) in her native Rome under Korean-born head coach and master Park Young-Gil.

Corsi made her official debut at the 2000 Summer Olympics in Sydney, where she competed in the women's 57-kg class. She opened her match with a more satisfactory victory over Brazil's Carmen Silva 5–2, before falling behind 1–8 on points to South Korean fighter Jung Jae-eun. Corsi granted herself a chance to compete for the Olympic bronze medal in the repechage, but she narrowly missed it in a 5–6 defeat to the Netherlands' Virginia Lourens, relegating her to fifth position.

Two years later, Corsi became a European champion in Samsun, Turkey under the women's featherweight division (59 kg), after brushing aside her Russian opponent Margarita Mkrtchyan in the final. When South Korea hosted the 2003 Summer Universiade in Daegu, Corsi chased the local favorite Kim Sae-rom for the gold, but her feat was only enough to take the silver medal.

At the 2004 Summer Olympics in Athens, Corsi qualified for her second Italian squad in the women's featherweight class (57 kg) by placing second behind South Korea's Jang Ji-won and granting a berth from the World Olympic Qualification Tournament in Paris, France. Seeded second and one of the athletes predicted to reach the final, Corsi started her fight with a smooth 2–0 triumph over France's Gwladys Épangue until she was stunned in a narrow 2–3 defeat to 20-year-old American neophyte Nia Abdallah during their quarterfinal match. In the repechage, Corsi secured a 5–2 lead over Russia's Margarita Mkrtchyan for another Olympic medal chance in the repechage, but ended again in fifth to match her placement from Sydney, following a 2–3 deficit to Mexico's Iridia Salazar. She died in Rome on 22 February 2016.
