= Jeong-yeon =

- Hangul: 정연
- RR: Jeongyeon
- MR: Chŏngyŏn

Jung-yeon (Korean: 정연) is a Korean given name. As of 2026, the name ranked 623th out of 36,179 male names and 255th out of 28,726 female names. A total of 3,276 people, consisting of 669 males and 2,607 females, were born with the name from 2008 to 2026.

Notable people with the name include:

- Park Jung-yeon, South Korean actress
- Seo Jeong-yeon, South Korean actress
- Ha Jeong-yeon, South Korean taekwondo practitioner.
- Jeongyeon, birth name Yoo Jeong-yeon, South Korean idol and member of Twice

== See also ==
- List of Korean given names
