= Margarita Mkrtchyan =

Russian taekwondo practitioner (1981–2013)

Personal information
- Full name: Margarita Mkrtchyan
- Nationality: Russian
- Born: 6 April 1981 Voronezh, Russian SFSR, Soviet Union
- Died: 11 July 2013 (aged 32) Karachay-Cherkessia, Russia
- Height: 1.67 m (5 ft 5 1/2 in)
- Weight: 57 kg (126 lb)

Sport
- Sport: Taekwondo
- Event: 57 kg
- Club: CSKA Moscow
- Coached by: Boris Zenkin
Medal record
Women's taekwondo
Representing Russia
European Championships
Silver medal – second place	2002 Samsun	59 kg
Silver medal – second place	2008 Rome	55 kg
Bronze medal – third place	2004 Lillehammer	55 kg

Margarita Mkrtchyan (Russian: Маргарита Гегамовна Мкртчян; 6 April 1981 – 11 July 2013) was a Russian taekwondo practitioner, who competed in the women's featherweight category. She claimed three medals (two silvers and one bronze) in the women's 55 and 59-kg classes at the European Championships and also finished seventh in the 57-kg division at the 2004 Summer Olympics, representing her nation Russia. Mkrtchyan also trained as a full-fledged member of the taekwondo team for CSKA Moscow under her personal coach and master Boris Zenkin.

Mkrtchyan qualified for the Russian squad in the women's featherweight class (57 kg) at the 2004 Summer Olympics in Athens, by placing second behind Spain's Sonia Reyes and granting a berth from the European Olympic Qualifying Tournament in Baku, Azerbaijan. She crashed out in an opening round defeat to U.S. taekwondo fighter Nia Abdallah with a score of 9–16, but slipped into the repechage bracket for her chance of an Olympic bronze medal, following Abdallah's progress towards the final match. In the repechage, Mkrtchyan subsided her Olympic medal chance by losing the first playoff 2–5 to her Italian opponent and two-time Olympian Cristiana Corsi, relegating the Russian to seventh position.

Mkrtchyan died in an automobile accident on 11 July 2013.
