= Ussadate Sutthikunkarn =

Thai taekwondo practitioner

Personal information
- Full name: Ussadate Sutthikunkarn
- Nationality: Thailand
- Born: 16 May 1981 (age 45) Bangkok, Thailand
- Height: 1.64 m (5 ft 4 1/2 in)
- Weight: 58 kg (128 lb)

Sport
- Sport: Taekwondo
- Event: 58 kg
Medal record
Men's taekwondo
Representing Thailand
World Championships
Bronze medal – third place	2005 Madrid	58 kg
Asian Championships
Silver medal – second place	2006 Bangkok	58 kg
Universiade
Silver medal – second place	2007 Bangkok	58 kg
Southeast Asian Games
Gold medal – first place	2001 Kuala Lumpur	58 kg
Silver medal – second place	2005 Manila	58 kg

Ussadate Sutthikunkarn (Thai: อัศม์เดชน์ สุทธิกุลการณ์; born 16 May 1981 in Bangkok) is a Thai taekwondo practitioner, who competed in the men's flyweight category. He claimed the gold medal in the men's flyweight division at the 2001 Southeast Asian Games in Kuala Lumpur, Malaysia, and later represented his nation Thailand at the 2004 Summer Olympics.

Sutthikunkarn qualified for the Thai squad in the men's flyweight class (58 kg) at the 2004 Summer Olympics in Athens, by defeating Vietnam's Nguyễn Quốc Huân for the top spot and securing a berth from the Asian Olympic Qualifying Tournament in his native Bangkok. He fell short in an adverse 2–5 defeat to Greek crowd favorite and reigning Olympic champion Michail Mouroutsos during his opening match. When Mouroutsos was mercilessly beaten by Egypt's Tamer Bayoumi in the quarterfinals, Sutthikunkarn denied his chance to proceed into the repechage for the Olympic bronze medal.
