= Areti Athanasopoulou =

Greek taekwondo practitioner

Personal information
- Full name: Areti Athanasopoulou
- Born: 17 November 1977 (age 48) Athens, Greece
- Height: 1.68 m (5 ft 6 in)
- Weight: 57 kg (126 lb)

Sport
- Sport: Taekwondo
- Event: 57 kg
- Club: AS Vyronas
- Coached by: Apostolos Iakovakis
Medal record
Women's taekwondo
Representing Greece
World Championships
Gold medal – first place	2003 Garmisch	59 kg

Areti Athanasopoulou (Greek: Αρετή Αθανασοπούλου; born November 17, 1977) is a Greek taekwondo practitioner, who competed in the women's featherweight category. She claimed a gold medal in the 59-kg class at the 2003 World Taekwondo Championships in Garmisch-Partenkirchen, Germany, and represented her nation Greece in two editions of the Olympic Games (2000 and 2004). Throughout her sporting career, Athanasopoulou trained as a member of taekwondo squad for AS Vyronas Athinaikos in her native Athens, under head coach and master Apostolos Iakovakis.

Athanasopoulou made her official debut at the 2000 Summer Olympics in Sydney, where she competed in the women's 57-kg class. She opened her match with a more convincing victory over Egypt's Shimaa Afifi by a marginal judging decision, before losing the quarterfinal to her Dutch opponent Virginia Lourens with a score of 6–8.

In 2003, Athanasopoulou improved her feat from the Olympics to capture the women's featherweight title over Mexico's Iridia Salazar on the referee's decision at the World Championships in Garmisch-Partenkirchen, Germany. Athanasopoulou's gold medal victory sealed her place on the Greek team, as her country hosted the 2004 Summer Olympics.

When her native Athens hosted the 2004 Summer Olympics, Athanasopoulou emerged as one of the crowd favorites among the Greek athletes in the women's featherweight class (57 kg), following her notable triumph from the World Championships a year earlier. In front of the raucous home crowd inside Faliro Coastal Zone Olympic Complex, Athanasopoulou suffered a shocking defeat to Thailand's Nootcharin Sukkhongdumnoen upon the referee's decision, after their opening match ended in a 6–6 draw. She later filed an appeal to the judges about the decision, but her protest to the score was immediately denied. Unable to deal with her painful defeat, Athanasopoulou admitted tearfully: "From what I saw, the difference in the score was 3 or 4 points in my favor, I'm so disappointed that I can barely hold my tears."
