= Paola Delgado =

Colombian taekwondo practitioner

Personal information
- Full name: Paola Andrea Delgado Díaz
- Nationality: Colombia
- Born: 21 January 1980 (age 46) Bogotá, Colombia
- Height: 1.67 m (5 ft 5 1/2 in)
- Weight: 57 kg (126 lb)

Sport
- Sport: Taekwondo
- Event: 57 kg

Paola Andrea Delgado Díaz (born January 21, 1980, in Bogotá) is a Colombian taekwondo practitioner, who competed in the women's featherweight category. She claimed a bronze medal in the 59-kg division at the 2000 Pan American Taekwondo Championships in Oranjestad, Aruba, and represented her nation Colombia at the 2004 Summer Olympics.

Delgado qualified for the Colombian squad in the women's featherweight class (57 kg) at the 2004 Summer Olympics in Athens, by placing third and granting a berth from the Pan American Olympic Qualifying Tournament in Querétaro, Mexico. Delgado lost her opening fight by a 2–5 margin to Mexican fighter and eventual bronze medalist Iridia Salazar. With Salazar failing to advance to the final upon her semifinal defeat to South Korea's Jang Ji-won, Delgado shortened her chances to proceed into the repechage bracket for the Olympic bronze medal.
