= Abeer Essawy =

Egyptian taekwondo practitioner

Abeer Essawy OLY
Personal information
- Full name: Abeer Essawy
- Nationality: Egypt
- Born: 23 September 1986 (age 40) Cairo, Egypt
- Height: 1.63 m (5 ft 4 in)
- Weight: 57 kg (126 lb)

Sport
- Sport: Taekwondo
- Event: 57 kg

Abeer Essawy (Arabic: عبير عيساوي; born September 23, 1986, in Cairo) is an Egyptian taekwondo practitioner, who competed in the women's featherweight category. She claimed two gold medals in the 55-kg division at the African Championships (2003 and 2005), and represented Egypt as a seventeen-year-old at the 2004 Summer Olympics.

Essawy qualified for the Egyptian squad in the women's featherweight class (57 kg) at the 2004 Summer Olympics in Athens by defeating Ivory Coast's Mariam Bah for the top spot and securing a berth from the African Olympic Qualifying Tournament in her native Cairo. With limited international experience, Essawy lost her opening fight 0–8 to Chinese Taipei's Chi Shu-ju. When her Taiwanese opponent was defeated by Thailand's Nootcharin Sukkhongdumnoen in the quarterfinals, Essawy lost her chance to proceed into the repechage for the Olympic bronze medal.
