= Taekwondo at the 2004 Summer Olympics – Women's 57 kg =

Taekwondo competition

Women's 57 kg at the Games of the XXVIII Olympiad
- Venue: Faliro Coastal Zone Olympic Complex
- Date: 27 August
- Competitors: 15 from 15 nations

Medalists
1st place, gold medalist(s)		Jang Ji-Won	South Korea
2nd place, silver medalist(s)		Nia Abdallah	United States
3rd place, bronze medalist(s)		Iridia Salazar	Mexico

The women's 57 kg competition in taekwondo at the 2004 Summer Olympics in Athens took place on August 27 at the Faliro Coastal Zone Olympic Complex.

South Korea's Jang Ji-Won outwitted her American counterpart Nia Abdallah to strike the women's featherweight title in the final with a default score of 2–1. Mexican fighter and three-time World silver medalist Iridia Salazar defied her odds to add a bronze to her career list, leading 2–1 over Spain's Sonia Reyes in the repechage.

== Competition format ==
The main bracket consisted of a single elimination tournament, culminating in the gold medal match. The taekwondo fighters eliminated in earlier rounds by the two finalists of the main bracket advanced directly to the repechage tournament. These matches determined the bronze medal winner for the event.

== Schedule ==
All times are Greece Standard Time (UTC+2)

Date	Time	Round
Friday, 27 August 2004	11:00; 16:00; 17:30; 20:30	Preliminary Round; Quarterfinals; Semifinals; Final

== Results ==
Legend

- PTG — Won by points gap
- KO — Won by knockout
- SUP — Won by superiority
- OT — Won on over time (Golden Point)
- WO — Walkover

=== Main bracket ===
Preliminary round
Paola Delgado (COL)	2
Iridia Salazar (MEX)	5
Aleksandra Uścińska (POL)	2
Sonia Reyes (ESP)	11
Mariam Bah (CIV)	2
Jang Ji-Won (KOR)	9
Areti Athanasopoulou (GRE)	6
Nootcharin Sukkhongdumnoen (THA)	6+
Abeer Essawy (EGY)	0
Chi Shu-ju (TPE)	8
Margarita Mkrtchyan (RUS)	9
Nia Abdallah (USA)	16
Gwladys Épangue (FRA)	0
Cristiana Corsi (ITA)	2

Quarterfinals
Irina Kaydashova (UZB)	7
Iridia Salazar (MEX)	7+
Sonia Reyes (ESP)	2
Jang Ji-Won (KOR)	3
Nootcharin Sukkhongdumnoen (THA)	2
Chi Shu-ju (TPE)	1
Nia Abdallah (USA)	3
Cristiana Corsi (ITA)	2

Semifinals
Iridia Salazar (MEX)	1
Jang Ji-Won (KOR)	2
Nootcharin Sukkhongdumnoen (THA)	7
Nia Abdallah (USA)	7+

Gold medal match
Jang Ji-Won (KOR)	2
Nia Abdallah (USA)	1

=== Repechage ===
Quarterfinals
Cristiana Corsi (ITA)	5
Margarita Mkrtchyan (RUS)	2
Sonia Reyes (ESP)	5
Mariam Bah (CIV)	0

Semifinals
Iridia Salazar (MEX)	3
Cristiana Corsi (ITA)	2
Nootcharin Sukkhongdumnoen (THA)	3
Sonia Reyes (ESP)	6

Bronze medal match
Iridia Salazar (MEX)	2
Sonia Reyes (ESP)	1
