= Nguyễn Quốc Huân =

Vietnamese taekwondo practitioner

Personal information
- Full name: Nguyễn Quốc Huân
- Nationality: Vietnam
- Born: 2 October 1981 (age 45) Hanoi, Vietnam
- Height: 1.70 m (5 ft 7 in)
- Weight: 58 kg (128 lb)

Sport
- Sport: Taekwondo
- Event: 58-kilogram (128 lb)
Medal record
Men's taekwondo
Representing Vietnam
Southeast Asian Games
Silver medal – second place	2005 Manila	58 kg

Nguyễn Quốc Huân (born October 2, 1981 in Hanoi) is a Vietnamese taekwondo practitioner, who competed in the men's flyweight category. He claimed a silver medal in the 58-kilogram (128-pound) division at the 2005 Southeast Asian Games in Manila, Philippines, and finished fifth at the 2004 Summer Olympics, representing his nation Vietnam. Huân is also the elder brother and a personal coach of Nguyễn Quốc Cường, who claimed the bronze medal in the boys' 55 kg category at the inaugural Youth Olympic Games in Singapore in 2010.

Huân qualified for the Vietnamese squad in the men's flyweight (58-kilogram or 128-pound) class at the 2004 Summer Olympics in Athens, by granting a berth and placing fifth from the Asian Olympic Qualifying Tournament in Bangkok, Thailand. Huân edged past Russia's Seyfula Magomedov in his opening match 12–10, and then yielded a startling 4–2 victory over his British opponent Paul Green in the quarterfinals. Fighting against his Mexico's Óscar Salazar in the semifinals, Huân collected a knee injury which his Mexican opponent ruthlessly exploited and ended the match in a painful 0–8 defeat. In the repechage, Huân slipped his chance for Vietnam's first Olympic medal at these Games after being beaten by Spain's Juan Antonio Ramos 0–8 in his first playoff and consequently relegated to fifth.
