= Akram Al-Noor =

Yemeni taekwondo practitioner

Personal information
- Full name: Akram Ahmed Abdullah Al-Noor
- Nationality: Yemen
- Born: 3 December 1987 (age 38) Sana'a, Yemen
- Height: 1.60 m (5 ft 3 in)
- Weight: 54 kg (119 lb)

Sport
- Sport: Taekwondo
- Event: 58 kg
Medal record
Men's taekwondo
Representing Yemen
Asian Games
Bronze medal – third place	2002 Busan	54 kg

Akram Ahmed Abdullah Al-Noor (Arabic: أكرم أحمد عبدالله النور; born 3 December 1987) is a retired Yemeni taekwondo practitioner. Al-Noor qualified for the Yemeni squad, as a 16-year-old teen, in the men's flyweight category (58 kg) at the 2004 Summer Olympics in Athens by receiving a berth from the World Olympic Qualifying Tournament in Paris, France. He lost the preliminary round of sixteen match to Ukraine's Oleksandr Shaposhnyk with a default score of 5–7. Al-Noor was also appointed as the Yemeni flag bearer by the National Olympic Committee in the opening ceremony.
