= Oleksandr Shaposhnyk =

Ukrainian taekwondo practitioner

Personal information
- Full name: Oleksandr Eduardovych Shaposhnyk
- Nationality: Ukraine
- Born: 18 June 1983 (age 43) Kharkiv, Ukrainian SSR, Soviet Union
- Height: 1.77 m (5 ft 9 1/2 in)
- Weight: 58 kg (128 lb)

Sport
- Sport: Taekwondo
- Event: 58 kg
Medal record
Men's taekwondo
Representing Ukraine
European Championships
Silver medal – second place	2002 Samsun	58 kg

Oleksandr Eduardovych Shaposhnyk (Ukrainian: Олександр Едуардович Шапошник; born 18 June 1983, in Kharkiv) is a Ukrainian taekwondo practitioner, who competed in the men's flyweight category. He claimed a silver medal in the 58-kg division at the 2002 European Taekwondo Championships in Samsun, Turkey, and later represented his nation Ukraine at the 2004 Summer Olympics.

Shaposhnyk qualified as a lone taekwondo jin for the Ukrainian squad in the men's flyweight class (58 kg) at the 2004 Summer Olympics in Athens, by granting a berth and placing third from the European Olympic Qualifying Tournament in Baku, Azerbaijan. Shaposhnyk got off to a flying start with an impressive 7–5 victory over Yemen's Akram Abdullah, but he was cautiously thrashed by his Mexican opponent Óscar Salazar in the quarterfinal match at 2–6. In the repechage, Shaposhnyk was scheduled to fight against Dominican Republic's Gabriel Mercedes on his first attempt, but pulled himself out of the tournament due to his knee injury sustained from the previous match.
