= Sonia Reyes =

Spanish taekwondo practitioner

Personal information
- Full name: Sonia Reyes Sáez
- Nationality: Spain
- Born: 30 January 1977 (age 49) Augsburg, Germany
- Height: 1.75 m (5 ft 9 in)
- Weight: 57 kg (126 lb)

Sport
- Sport: Taekwondo
- Event: 57 kg
- Club: Club Sung Dae Kwan
- Coached by: Song Dae-young
Medal record
Women's taekwondo
Representing Spain
World Championships
Bronze medal – third place	1999 Edmonton	59 kg
Bronze medal – third place	2001 Jeju City	59 kg
Bronze medal – third place	2003 Garmisch	59 kg
European Championships
Silver medal – second place	2000 Patras	59 kg
Bronze medal – third place	2002 Samsun	59 kg

Sonia Reyes Sáez (Note: In this Spanish name, the first or paternal surname is Reyes and the second or maternal family name is Sáez.) (born 30 January 1977) is a Spanish taekwondo practitioner, who competed in the women's featherweight category. She was born in Augsburg. Considered one of the world's top favorites in her respective category, Reyes picked up a total of five medals in her career, including three bronze from the World Taekwondo Championships, and finished fourth in the 57-kg division at the 2004 Summer Olympics. Throughout her sporting career, Reyes trained full-time for Club Sung Dae Kwan in Madrid, under head coach and master Song Dae-young.

== Career ==
Reyes started her taekwondo career by becoming a bronze medalist in the 51-kg division at the 1992 European Junior Championships in Paris, France. Seven years later, she picked up another bronze on her first senior stint in the podium at the World Championships in Edmonton, Canada. Although she failed to earn a spot on the Spanish team to the 2000 Summer Olympics, Reyes continued to achieve remarkable results and yield more medals in her career list, including a silver from the European Championships in Patras, Greece, losing the final to Dutch fighter Virginia Lourens.

At the 2004 Summer Olympics in Athens, Reyes qualified for the Spanish taekwondo squad in the women's featherweight class (57 kg) by granting a berth and placing first in the final match against Russia's Margarita Mkrtchyan from the European Olympic Qualifying Tournament in Baku, Azerbaijan. She opened her match with a marvelous 11–2 victory over Poland's Aleksandra Uścińska, before narrowly losing the quarterfinal to South Korean taekwondo jin and world-ranked no. 2 Jang Ji-won at 2–3. In the repechage rounds, Reyes came from behind to dispatch Ivory Coast's Mariam Bah (5–0) and Thailand's Nootcharin Sukkhongdumnoen (6–3) for a chance to compete in the bronze medal match, where she fell short to Mexico's Iridia Salazar with a close 2–1 record, relegating Reyes to fourth position.

== Personal life ==
Reyes' daughter, Lena, is a taekwondo practitioner.
