= Irina Kaydashova =

Uzbekistani taekwondo practitioner

Personal information
- Full name: Irina Kaydashova
- Nationality: Uzbekistan
- Born: 2 April 1985 (age 41) Tashkent, Uzbek SSR, Soviet Union
- Height: 1.68 m (5 ft 6 in)
- Weight: 57 kg (126 lb)

Sport
- Sport: Taekwondo
- Event: 57 kg

Irina Kaydashova (Uzbek: Ирина Кайдашова; born April 2, 1985, in Tashkent) is an Uzbek taekwondo practitioner, who competed in the women's featherweight category. She became one of the first taekwondo fighters in history to represent Uzbekistan at the 2004 Summer Olympics, and later attained a quarterfinal finish in the 53-kg division at the 2010 Asian Games in Guangzhou, China.

Kaydashova qualified for an all-female Uzbek taekwondo squad in the women's featherweight class (57 kg) at the 2004 Summer Olympics in Athens, by placing second behind Thailand's Nootcharin Sukkhongdumnoen and granting a berth from the Asian Olympic Qualifying Tournament in Bangkok, Thailand. Kaydashova moved directly into the quarterfinals with a first round bye in a provisional seeding draw, but she crashed out early to Mexico's Iridia Salazar on the referee's decision after their match ended in a 7–7 tie. With Salazar losing the semifinal bout to South Korea's Jang Ji-won, Kaydashova denied her chance to compete for the Olympic bronze medal in the repechage.
