= 2003 World Taekwondo Championships =

Taekwondo competition

- Venue: Olympia-Eissport-Zentrum
- Location: Garmisch-Partenkirchen, Germany
- Dates: 24–28 September 2003

Champions
- Men: South Korea
- Women: South Korea

The 2003 World Taekwondo Championships are the 16th edition of the World Taekwondo Championships, and were held in Garmisch-Partenkirchen, Germany from 24 to 28 September 2003. A total of 830 athletes, 502 males and 328 females, from 100 nations took part in the championships.

== Medal summary ==
=== Men ===
Event	Gold	Silver	Bronze
Finweight (−54 kg)	Choi Yeon-ho; South Korea	Paul Green; Great Britain	Zahid Mammadov; Azerbaijan
Finweight (−54 kg)	Choi Yeon-ho; South Korea	Paul Green; Great Britain	Roberto Cruz; Philippines
Flyweight (−58 kg)	Chu Mu-yen; Chinese Taipei	Behzad Khodadad; Iran	Ko Seok-hwa; South Korea
Flyweight (−58 kg)	Chu Mu-yen; Chinese Taipei	Behzad Khodadad; Iran	Tim Thackrey; United States
Bantamweight (−62 kg)	Huang Chih-hsiung; Chinese Taipei	Omar Badia; Spain	Peter López; United States
Bantamweight (−62 kg)	Huang Chih-hsiung; Chinese Taipei	Omar Badia; Spain	Omid Gholamzadeh; Iran
Featherweight (−67 kg)	Kang Nam-won; South Korea	Mark López; United States	Erdal Aylanc; Germany
Featherweight (−67 kg)	Kang Nam-won; South Korea	Mark López; United States	Niyamaddin Pashayev; Azerbaijan
Lightweight (−72 kg)	Kim Kyo-sik; South Korea	Hadi Saei; Iran	Rashad Ahmadov; Azerbaijan
Lightweight (−72 kg)	Kim Kyo-sik; South Korea	Hadi Saei; Iran	Tuncay Çalışkan; Austria
Welterweight (−78 kg)	Steven López; United States	Mohamed Ebnoutalib; Germany	Rosendo Alonso; Spain
Welterweight (−78 kg)	Steven López; United States	Mohamed Ebnoutalib; Germany	Oh Seon-taek; South Korea
Middleweight (−84 kg)	Yousef Karami; Iran	Mickaël Borot; France	Bahri Tanrıkulu; Turkey
Middleweight (−84 kg)	Yousef Karami; Iran	Mickaël Borot; France	Tavakkul Bayramov; Azerbaijan
Heavyweight (+84 kg)	Morteza Rostami; Iran	Zakaria Asidah; Denmark	Mici Kuzmanović; Croatia
Heavyweight (+84 kg)	Morteza Rostami; Iran	Zakaria Asidah; Denmark	Lin Wen-cheng; Chinese Taipei

=== Women ===
Event	Gold	Silver	Bronze
Finweight (−47 kg)	Brigitte Yagüe; Spain	Wang Ying; China	Thucuc Pham; Germany
Finweight (−47 kg)	Brigitte Yagüe; Spain	Wang Ying; China	Dalia Contreras; Venezuela
Flyweight (−51 kg)	Lee Ji-hye; South Korea	Yanelis Labrada; Cuba	Elisha Voren; United States
Flyweight (−51 kg)	Lee Ji-hye; South Korea	Yanelis Labrada; Cuba	Yaowapa Boorapolchai; Thailand
Bantamweight (−55 kg)	Ha Jeong-yeon; South Korea	Taylor Stone; United States	Nootcharin Sukkhongdumnoen; Thailand
Bantamweight (−55 kg)	Ha Jeong-yeon; South Korea	Taylor Stone; United States	Véronique St-Jacques; Canada
Featherweight (−59 kg)	Areti Athanasopoulou; Greece	Iridia Salazar; Mexico	Sonia Reyes; Spain
Featherweight (−59 kg)	Areti Athanasopoulou; Greece	Iridia Salazar; Mexico	Lise Hjortshøj; Denmark
Lightweight (−63 kg)	Kim Yeon-ji; South Korea	Karine Sergerie; Canada	Tina Morgan; Australia
Lightweight (−63 kg)	Kim Yeon-ji; South Korea	Karine Sergerie; Canada	Yuliya Sukhavitskaya; Belarus
Welterweight (−67 kg)	Lee Sun-hee; South Korea	Sandra Šarić; Croatia	Liya Nurkina; Kazakhstan
Welterweight (−67 kg)	Lee Sun-hee; South Korea	Sandra Šarić; Croatia	Elisavet Mystakidou; Greece
Middleweight (−72 kg)	Luo Wei; China	Myriam Baverel; France	Mounia Bourguigue; Morocco
Middleweight (−72 kg)	Luo Wei; China	Myriam Baverel; France	Aitziber Los Arcos; Spain
Heavyweight (+72 kg)	Youn Hyun-jung; South Korea	Nataša Vezmar; Croatia	Chen Zhong; China
Heavyweight (+72 kg)	Youn Hyun-jung; South Korea	Nataša Vezmar; Croatia	Kyriaki Kouvari; Greece

== Medal table ==
Rank	Nation	Gold	Silver	Bronze	Total
1	South Korea	8	0	2	10
2	Iran	2	2	1	5
3	Chinese Taipei	2	0	1	3
4	United States	1	2	3	6
5	Spain	1	1	3	5
6	China	1	1	1	3
7	Greece	1	0	2	3
8	Croatia	0	2	1	3
9	France	0	2	0	2
10	Germany	0	1	2	3
11	Canada	0	1	1	2
11	Denmark	0	1	1	2
13	Cuba	0	1	0	1
13	Great Britain	0	1	0	1
13	Mexico	0	1	0	1
16	Azerbaijan	0	0	4	4
17	Thailand	0	0	2	2
18	Australia	0	0	1	1
18	Austria	0	0	1	1
18	Belarus	0	0	1	1
18	Kazakhstan	0	0	1	1
18	Morocco	0	0	1	1
18	Philippines	0	0	1	1
18	Turkey	0	0	1	1
18	Venezuela	0	0	1	1
Totals (25 entries)		16	16	32	64

== Team ranking ==
=== Men ===
Rank	Team	Points
1	South Korea	68
2	Iran	62
3	Chinese Taipei	48
4	United States	47
5	Azerbaijan	36
6	Germany	33
7	France	32
8	Spain	31
9	Russia	26
10	Turkey	25

=== Women ===
Rank	Team	Points
1	South Korea	79
2	China	40
3	Spain	37
4	Greece	35
5	Croatia	34
6	United States	31
7	Germany	30
8	Canada	29
9	Mexico	25
10	Australia	22
