= Carina Maravillas =

Mexican footballer (born 1983)

Personal information
- Full name: Laura Carina Maravillas Valladolid
- Date of birth: 22 June 1983 (age 43)
- Place of birth: Mexico
- Position: Defender

Senior career*
Years	Team	Apps	(Gls)
2004	Palomas		

International career
2004	Mexico	0 (?)	(0)
- * Club domestic league appearances and goals

Laura Carina Maravillas Valladolid (born 22 June 1983) is a Mexican football defender who played for the Mexico women's national football team at the 2004 Summer Olympics. At the club level, she played for Palomas.

== See also ==
- Mexico at the 2004 Summer Olympics
