= Nancy Gutiérrez (footballer) =

American-born Mexican former footballer (born 1987)

Personal information
- Full name: Nancy Gutiérrez Vásquez
- Birth name: Nancy Gutierrez
- Date of birth: 2 June 1987 (age 39)
- Place of birth: Los Angeles, United States
- Position: Defender

College career
Years	Team	Apps	(Gls)
2005–2006	Cerritos Falcons		

Senior career*
Years	Team	Apps	(Gls)
2004	Arsenal Soccer Club		

International career
2004	Mexico U19		
2004	Mexico		
- * Club domestic league appearances and goals

Nancy Gutiérrez Vásquez (born 2 June 1987) is a former footballer who played as a defender. Born in the United States, she was a member of the Mexico women's national team.

== Club career ==
Gutiérrez played for Arsenal Soccer in the United States.

== International career ==
Gutiérrez represented Mexico at the 2004 CONCACAF U-19 Women's Qualifying Tournament. At senior level, she played the 2004 Summer Olympics.

== See also ==
- Mexico at the 2004 Summer Olympics
