= Ha Jeong-yeon =

South Korean taekwondo practitioner

Personal information
- Nationality: South Korean
- Born: 19 May 1984 (age 42)

Sport
- Sport: Taekwondo
Medal record
Representing South Korea
Women's taekwondo
World Championships
Gold medal – first place	2003 Garmisch-Partenkirchen	Bantamweight

Ha Jeong-yeon (born 19 May 1984) is a South Korean taekwondo practitioner.

She won a gold medal in bantamweight at the 2003 World Taekwondo Championships in Garmisch-Partenkirchen, by defeating Nootcharin Sukkhongdumnoen in the semifinal, and Taylor Stone in the final.
