= Elisha Voren =

American taekwondo practitioner

Elisha Voren (born October 7, 1980) is an American former International-level competitor in the sport of Taekwondo. She was born in west palm beach, Florida on October 7, 1980. In 2003, she earned a bronze medal in the World Taekwondo Championships. She also competed in the 2000 Olympic trials for Taekwondo. She has additionally competed as a crossfit athlete. She is now located in California.
