= Zahid Mammadov =

Azerbaijani taekwondo practitioner

Medal record

Men's taekwondo

Representing Azerbaijan

World Championships
Bronze medal – third place	2003 Garmisch	Finweight

European Championships
Silver medal – second place	2006 Bonn	Finweight

Zahid Mammadov (born 16 September 1981) is a retired taekwondo athlete for the Azerbaijan. Notably, he won a bronze medal at the 2003 World Championships and a silver medal at the 2006 European Championships.
