= Tim Thackrey =

American taekwondo practitioner

Personal information
- Born: October 1, 1979 (age 46)

Sport
- Sport: Taekwondo
Medal record
Men's taekwondo
Representing United States
World Championships
Bronze medal – third place	2003 Garmisch	Flyweight
Pan American Games
Gold medal – first place	2003 Santo Domingo	58 kg

Tim Thackrey (born October 1, 1979) is a retired taekwondo athlete for the USA & current strength & conditioning coach for Olympians & professional athletes. He was a seven-time US National Team Member in the flyweight class (-58 kg, 127.6 lbs) from 2000 through 2007. Notably, he won a gold medal at the 2003 Pan American Games and a bronze medal at the 2003 World Championships. He was a resident athlete at the US Olympic Training Center in Colorado Springs, CO from 2001 to 2003. In 2006, he was named USA Taekwondo's Male Athlete of the Year.

Thackrey is a graduate of UCLA where he attended undergraduate and graduate school, as 5 year Coach of the UCLA Taekwondo Program.

== Coach ==
Thackrey currently works as a professional strength & conditioning coach that works with Olympians and professional athletes. He had multiple athletes in the 2016 Summer Olympics including the USA's Stephen Lambdin and New Zealand's Andrea Kilday. Thackrey has also returned several times to coach Junior and Senior athletes at the United States Olympic Training Center.

== Achievements ==
- 2000-2007 US National Team - [Fly]
- 2002 US Open - [Fly] - Bronze
- 2002 Pan Am Taekwondo Championships - [Fly] - Bronze
- 2003 US Open - [Fly]
- 2003/2007 US Pan Am Games Team Member [Fly]
- 2003 Pan Am Games - Dominican Republic [Fly] Gold
- 2003 World Championships - Germany [Fly] - Bronze
- 2006 Pan Am Taekwondo Championships - [Fly] - Bronze
- 2006 Pan Am Games Qualification [Fly] - Silver
- 2006 Dutch Open - Gold
- 2006 German Open - Silver
- 2006 US Open - Bantam - Bronze
- 2006 USA Athlete of the Year
- 2012 CrossFit SoCal Regional Competitor
- 2012 American Open Weightlifting Qualification

== TV and podcasts ==
Thackrey appeared in TV shows & podcasts as a strength & conditioning expert, including The Talk where he taught CrossFit to the hosts including Sharon Osbourne and Aisha Tyler, and the WOD Cast Podcast where he spoke about his athletic competitions.
