= Dioselina Valderrama =

American-born Mexican footballer (born 1984)

Personal information
- Full name: Dioselina Valderrama Reyes
- Date of birth: 28 April 1984 (age 42)
- Place of birth: San Diego, California, United States
- Height: 1.60 m (5 ft 3 in)
- Position: Midfielder

Senior career*
| Years | Team | Apps | (Gls) |
| 2004 | Bonita Rebel | | |

International career
| 2004 | Mexico | 0 (?) | (0) |
- * Club domestic league appearances and goals

Dioselina Valderrama Reyes (born 28 April 1984) is an American-born Mexican former footballer who played as a midfielder for the Mexico national team at the 2004 Summer Olympics. At the club level, she played for Bonita Rebel.

== See also ==
- Mexico at the 2004 Summer Olympics
