= Nootcharin Sukkhongdumnoen =

Thai taekwondo practitioner

Personal information
- Full name: Nootcharin Sukkhongdumnoen
- Nationality: Thailand
- Born: 10 February 1978 (age 48) Bangkok, Thailand
- Height: 1.60 m (5 ft 3 in)
- Weight: 57 kg (126 lb)

Sport
- Sport: Taekwondo
- Event: 57 kg
Medal record
Women's taekwondo
Representing Thailand
World Championships
| Bronze medal – third place | 2003 Garmisch | 55 kg |
Asian Games
| Silver medal – second place | 1998 Bangkok | 51 kg |
Asian Championships
| Silver medal – second place | 1998 Ho Chi Minh | 55 kg |
Southeast Asian Games
| Gold medal – first place | 2001 Kuala Lumpur | 59 kg |

Nootcharin Sukkhongdumnoen (Thai: นุชจรินทร์ สุขคงดำเนิน; born February 10, 1978, in Bangkok) is a Thai taekwondo practitioner, who competed in the women's featherweight category. She claimed the silver medal in the 51-kg division at the 1998 Asian Games in her native Bangkok, obtained a bronze at the 2003 World Taekwondo Championships in Garmisch-Partenkirchen, Germany, and later attained a fifth-place finish in the 58-kg category at the 2004 Summer Olympics, representing her nation Thailand.

Sukkhongdumnoen qualified for the Thai squad in the women's featherweight class (57 kg) at the 2004 Summer Olympics in Athens, by defeating Uzbekistan's Irina Kaydashova for the top spot and securing a berth from the Asian Olympic Qualifying Tournament in her native Bangkok. Sukkhongdumnoen had to deal with tough crowds at the start of the tournament, as she upset the Greek favorite and two-time Olympian Areti Athanasopoulou on the marginal judging decision, resulting to a 6–6 draw and a storming protest from the opposition. Following her surprising victory in the opening round, Sukkhongdumnoen defied odds to pummel Chinese Taipei's Chi Shu-ju in the quarterfinals by a narrow 2–1 margin, before she fell short on the referee's decision to U.S. taekwondo neophyte and eventual silver medalist Nia Abdallah in the semifinals. When Abdallah progressed to the final, Sukkhongdumnoen gave herself a chance for the Olympic bronze medal in the repechage, but dropped abruptly to a 3–6 decision against Spain's Sonia Reyes in her first playoff, relegating Sukkhongdumnoen to fifth position.
