= AYA Awards =

Malaysian youth ambassador awards

- Awarded for: Recognition to individuals and institutions for their spirit of perseverance in their efforts to better themselves as well as their community and nation.
- Country: Malaysia
- Presented by: Asian Youth Ambassadors (AYA)
- First award: 2005
- Website: http://www.ayaawards.com

The AYA (Asian Youth Ambassadors) Awards are awards that give recognition to individuals and institutions for their spirit of perseverance in their efforts to better themselves as well as their community and nation.

== History ==
The awards started in 2005 by the founder of AYA (A non-profit youth development organization), Kenneth Chin. The awards have since been held consecutively since 2006. The objective of starting the awards was to inspire, incite, and inculcate responsible attitudes and actions in the hearts and minds of the youth of Malaysia as well as to cultivate and build leaders of the nation.

== Durian Trophies ==
The award trophies are presented as pewter castings of the durian fruit. This representation of the durian connotes a hard, rough and prickly outside; and soft, gentle and pliable on the inside. Thus, the trophy depicts the concept of the hard work needed to break through the shell in order to obtain the flesh of the durian on the inside. The significance of the durian also suggests an attempt to open up mindsets may most times be a painful experience – a thorn in the flesh, but patience is needed as the fruit is well worth the effort.

== Ceremony ==
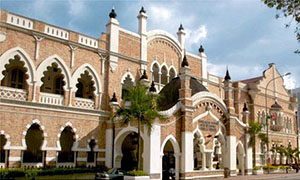
The Panggung Bandaraya (City Theatre) in Kuala Lumpur where it hosted The AYA Awards 2010, November 7, 2010.

Venue

The AYA Awards has been held at various locations. In 2005 and 2006, the AYA Awards ceremony was held at the AYA Conference Centre in Summit Hotel. From 2007–2009, the AYA Awards Night was held at the Kuala Lumpur Performing Arts Centre (KLPAC). The AYA Awards 2010 was held at the Panggung Bandaraya (City Theatre), Kuala Lumpur – a historical theatre hall established in 1904, and had been gazetted as a heritage building under the Antiquities Act. For the year of 2010, Saiful Nang has won the title as Asian youth ambassador and until today, he is the last AYA Award recipient

AYA Awards Night

The AYA Awards Night usually features dance and song performances by local and young performers before the Awards recipients are presented. Some of the highlighted performances include traditional dances presented by AFS Antarabudaya Malaysia (a non-profit intercultural organization), song performances with AYA choir in collaboration with singer/songwriter Mia Palencia, wheelchair dance performance by the Beautiful Gate Foundation for the Disabled (BGF) and dance performances by the AYA Dance Crew – Lightbulb Productions. The finalists of both categories are then presented with the awards for the Most Outstanding Youth of the Year Award and the Youth Friendly Company of the Year Award.
