= Paul Green (taekwondo) =

British taekwondo athlete

Medal record

Representing United Kingdom

Men's taekwondo

World Championships
| Silver medal – second place | 2003 Garmisch | Finweight |

European Championships
| Gold medal – first place | 2004 Lillehammer | Finweight |
| Silver medal – second place | 1996 Helsinki | Finweight |

Paul Green (born 16 February 1977) is a British former international taekwondo athlete, GB National Team player, coach of the GB National Squad, and current coach of the USAT Nationals Team.

Green was born in Manchester, England. After a successful trial and being selected for the GB National Team, he fought in the 2004 Athens Olympics. Green is now a USA Taekwondo National Team coach.

Green coached the 2012 and 2016 Olympic Gold and World Champion Gold 2015 and 2017.
