= Tamer Bayoumi =

Egyptian taekwondo practitioner

Medal record

Representing Egypt

Men's taekwondo

Olympic Games
| Bronze medal – third place | 2004 Athens | 58 kg |

World Championships
| Bronze medal – third place | 2007 Beijing | Flyweight |

Tamer Salah Ali Abdu Bayoumi (Egyptian Arabic: تامر بيومى; born 12 April 1982) is an Egyptian taekwondo athlete who won a bronze medal in the 58 kg weight class at the 2004 Summer Olympics after defeating Juan Antonio Ramos of Spain. He also won a bronze at the 2007 World Championships.

== See also ==
- Egypt at the 2004 Summer Olympics
