= Chu Mu-yen =

Taiwanese taekwondo practitioner

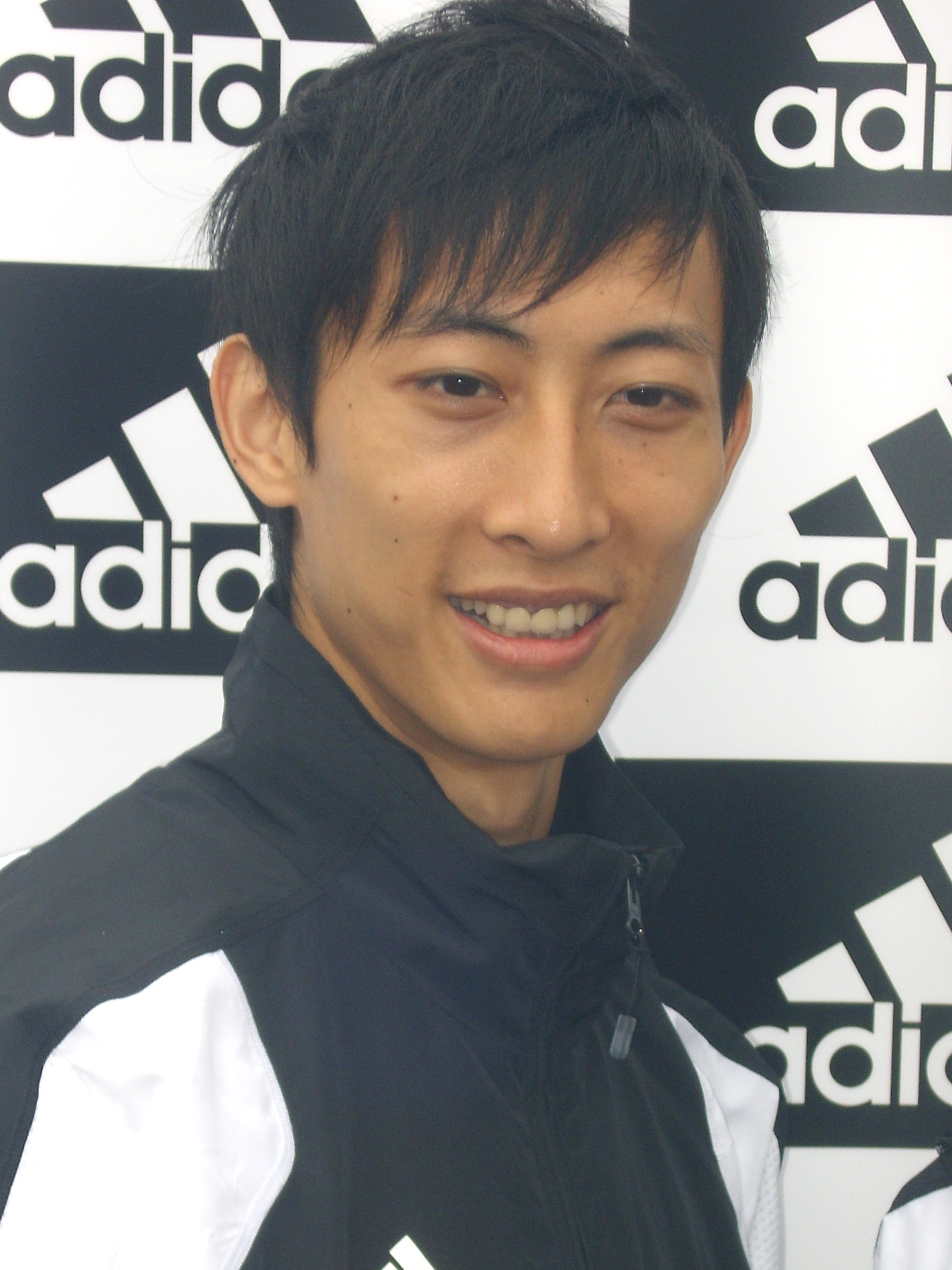
- Chu in 2008

Personal information
- Born: 14 March 1982 (age 44) Pingzhen District, Taoyuan, Taiwan
Medal record
Men's taekwondo
Representing Chinese Taipei
Olympic Games
Gold medal – first place	2004 Athens	58 kg
Bronze medal – third place	2008 Beijing	58 kg
World Championships
Silver medal – second place	1998 Istanbul	Flyweight
Silver medal – second place	2001 Jeju	Finweight
Gold medal – first place	2003 Garmisch-Partenkirchen	Flyweight
WTF World Cup
Silver medal – second place	2000 Lyon	Finweight
Gold medal – first place	2001 Hochiminh City	Finweight
Student World Championships
Gold medal – first place	2002 Berkeley	Finweight
Bronze medal – third place	2004 Patra	Flyweight
Universiade
Gold medal – first place	2003 Daegu	Flyweight
Asian Games
Silver medal – second place	2002 Busan	Finweight
Bronze medal – third place	2006 Doha	Flyweight

Chu Mu-yen (Chinese: 朱木炎; pinyin: Zhū Mùyán; born 14 March 1982) is a Taiwanese Taekwondo athlete from Taiwan. He is the second Taiwanese athlete and the first male to win a gold medal at the Olympics, winning in men's under 58-kilogram class in Taekwondo at the Athens 2004 Games. In the 2008 Olympics, Chu won the bronze medal in the men's under 58-kilogram class in Taekwondo. He also won the gold medal in the 2003 World Taekwondo Championships.
