= Juan Antonio Ramos =

Spanish taekwondo practitioner

Medal record

Representing Spain

Men's taekwondo

World Championships
Gold medal – first place	1997 Hong Kong	Finweight
Gold medal – first place	2007 Beijing	Flyweight
Bronze medal – third place	2001 Jeju	Finweight

Juan Antonio Ramos Sánchez (born 18 August 1976 in Barcelona) is a Spanish taekwondo practitioner.

He is a two-time world champion, winning the finweight title in 1997 and the flyweight title in 2007. He also competed for Spain at the 2004 and 2008 Olympic Games, finishing fourth and equal fifth respectively. He is married to Brigitte Yagüe, also successful in taekwondo. He was a coach at the 2012 Olympic Games for Anthony Obame of Gabon, where Obame won Silver medal in men's heavyweight.

Now Ramos is the French national team coach.
