= Óscar Salazar (taekwondo) =

Olympic taekwondo practitioner

Personal information
- Born: November 3, 1977 (age 48) Mexico City, Mexico

Sport
- Sport: Taekwondo
Medal record
Representing Mexico
Men's taekwondo
Olympic Games
Silver medal – second place	2004 Athens	58 kg
World Championships
Bronze medal – third place	1997 Hong Kong	Bantamweight
Pan American Games
Gold medal – first place	1999 Winnipeg	58 kg
Silver medal – second place	2003 Santo Domingo	58 kg
Central American and Caribbean Games
Gold medal – first place	2002 San Salvador	58 kg

Óscar Francisco Salazar Blanco (born November 3, 1977) is a Mexican taekwondo practitioner and Olympic medalist. He competed at the 2004 Summer Olympics in Athens, where he received a silver medal in the 58 kg class. He is the brother of Iridia Salazar, who is also a taekwondo practitioner. He won a gold medal at the 1999 Pan American Games in Winnipeg.

== Career Achievements ==
- 1996 Pan American Taekwondo Championships Fly - Gold
- 1997 World Taekwondo Championships Fly - Bronze
- 1998 Pan American Taekwondo Championships Fly - Gold
- 1999 Pan American Games Fly - Gold
- 2000 World Taekwondo Cup Fly - Silver
- 2002 Pan American Taekwondo Championships bantham - Gold
- 2002 Centro American Games Bantham - Gold
- 2003 Pan American Games Fly - Silver
- 2004 Pan American Olympic Qualify Tourney Fly - Gold
