= Nia Abdallah =

American taekwondo practitioner

- Born: Nia Nicole Abdallah; January 24, 1984 (age 42); Houston, Texas, U.S.
- Height: 5 ft 9 in (1.75 m)
- Division: Featherweight/Welterweight
- Style: Taekwondo 3rd dan black belt in taekwondo

Nia Nicole Abdallah (born January 24, 1984) is the 2004 Olympic silver medalist and the first U.S. woman to officially medal in taekwondo at the Olympic Games. In 2007, Abdallah was inducted into the Taekwondo Hall of Fame.

== Early life ==
Abdallah was born and raised in Houston, Texas, and was introduced to taekwondo by her stepfather when she was nine years old. After graduating from George Washington Carver High School in Houston, she went to live in Colorado Springs. After training at the Olympic Training Center, she went on to compete, first in open class international competition, then on the world and Olympic level.

== Athletic career ==
Abdallah represented her country at the 2004 Olympics, where she won the silver medal. This made her the first and youngest American female to win a medal in the Olympics in taekwondo since it became an official Olympic sport. The Olympic games was her 3rd World international competition.

While trying to earn her spot to compete for her second gold medal in the 2008 Summer Olympics in Beijing, Abdallah found herself at the center of controversy. Diana Lopez was receiving national attention for her hopes of joining her two brothers representing the United States in taekwondo. After three rounds of the final bout between Abdallah and Lopez, no points had been scored, and the fight went into sudden death overtime where Lopez scored a winning kick. Abdallah's loss was controversial due to points judges did not count.

Suffering from long term injures, Abdallah decided to try for one last Olympic team at the 2012 Olympic trials. Fighting 7 fights in one day, she earned her spot in the Olympic trials for the 3rd Olympics. She fell short to Paige McPherson who went on to win a bronze in London. This marked the end of an Abdallah's athletic career. She then went on to focus on coaching.

== Coaching ==
In the months following her retirement, Abdallah has become the Texas state women's head coach and has started her own competition team named "Team Bacho" in her hometown of Houston. Her goal is to become the United States first female head coach. Abdallah also travels around the country teaching seminars.

=== Abdallah's competition record ===
- 2010 U.S. Open (welter): bronze
- 2009 U.S. National Team Member (Welter)
- 2008 Olympic Trials (Feather): 2nd
- 2007 World Championships: bronze
- 2007 National Collegiate Championships (Light): gold
- 2007 U.S. National Team Member (Light)
- 2007 U.S. Open (Light): bronze
- 2006 Dutch Open (Light): silver
- 2006 Pan Am Championships (light): silver
- 2006 U.S. National Team Member (Light)
- 2006 National Collegiate Championships (welter): gold
- 2005 U.S. Senior Nationals (light): silver
- 2004 Olympic Games: silver
- 2003 Pan Am Games: bronze
- 2003 U.S. Open: gold
- 2003 U.S. Senior Nationals: silver
- 2002 U.S. Open: gold
- 2001 U.S. Open: gold
- 2001 U.S. Senior Nationals: gold
