= Jang Ji-won =

South Korean taekwondoin (born 1979)

Olympic medal record

Women's taekwondo

Representing South Korea
Gold medal – first place	2004 Athens	-57kg

World Championships
Gold medal – first place	2001 Jeju	Featherweight

- Korean name
- Hangul: 장지원
- Hanja: 張知媛
- RR: Jang Jiwon
- MR: Chang Chiwŏn

Jang Ji-won (Korean: 장지원; born August 30, 1979) is a South Korean Taekwondo practitioner who competed at the 2004 Summer Olympics.

She won the gold medal in the 57 kg division.
