= Iridia Salazar =

Mexican taekwondo practitioner

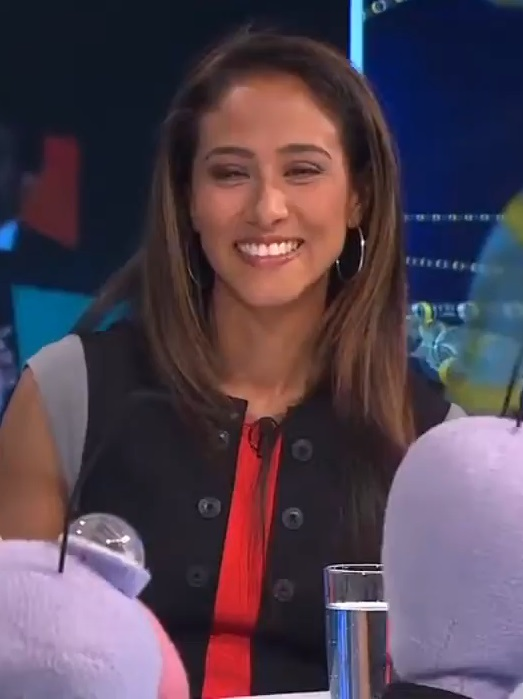

Personal information
- Born: June 14, 1982 (age 44)
Medal record
Women's taekwondo
Representing Mexico
Olympic Games
Bronze medal – third place	2004 Athens	– 57 kg
World Championships
Silver medal – second place	1999 Edmonton	Featherweight
Silver medal – second place	2001 Jeju	Featherweight
Silver medal – second place	2003 Garmisch	Bantamweight
Pan American Games
Gold medal – first place	2003 Santo Domingo	– 57 kg
Gold medal – first place	2007 Rio de Janeiro	– 57 kg

Iridia Salazar Blanco (born June 14, 1982) is a Mexican taekwondo practitioner and Olympic medalist.

== Sports career ==
She competed at the 2004 Summer Olympics in Athens, where she received a bronze medal in the 57 kg class. She plays soccer too in Club Casa Blanca Juriquilla

Salazar won a silver medal at the 2001 World Taekwondo Championships in Jeju, and also a silver medal at the 2003 World Taekwondo Championships in Garmisch Partenkirchen. She carried the flag for her native country at the opening ceremony of the 2007 Pan American Games in Rio de Janeiro, Brazil, where she won a gold medal.

== Political career ==
In the 2009 mid-term election Salazar entered politics when she ran for Congress as the alternate of Alfonso Martínez Alcázar in Michoacán's eighth district. She represented the constituency in the Chamber of Deputies for the National Action Party (PAN) during the remainder of Martínez Alcázar's term after he resigned his seat on 12 August 2011.
