= Taekwondo at the 1992 Summer Olympics =

Taekwondo at the Games of the XXV Olympiad
- Competitors: 128

Taekwondo was a demonstration sport at the 1992 Summer Olympics in Barcelona. It was the second time that the sport was included in the Olympic program; it would become an official sport eight years later at the 2000 Games. A total of 64 men and 64 women competed in eight different weight classes. Each event featured a single-elimination tournament to determine the winner.

== People ==
The head coach for the U.S. Olympic Taekwondo team was Dong Keun Park, the former member of the South Korean National Team from 1960 through 1966. He captained the South Korean team for five years with the undefeated record of winning more than 200 competition matches with multiple bouts, and has been inducted into the official Taekwondo Hall of Fame and US Taekwondo Grandmasters Society Hall of Fame.

== Medalists ==
=== Medal table ===
Rank	Nation	Gold	Silver	Bronze	Total
1	South Korea	5	0	2	7
2	Spain	4	1	1	6
3	Chinese Taipei	3	0	2	5
4	United States	1	2	3	6
5	Mexico	1	0	2	3
6	Venezuela	1	0	1	2
7	Denmark	1	0	0	1
8	Canada	0	3	2	5
9	Indonesia	0	3	1	4
10	Turkey	0	2	1	3
11	France	0	1	2	3
11	Italy	0	1	2	3
13	Iran	0	1	1	2
14	New Zealand	0	1	0	1
14	Nigeria	0	1	0	1
16	Australia	0	0	2	2
16	Egypt	0	0	2	2
16	Philippines	0	0	2	2
19	Great Britain	0	0	1	1
19	Greece	0	0	1	1
19	Jordan	0	0	1	1
19	Kuwait	0	0	1	1
19	Malaysia	0	0	1	1
19	Morocco	0	0	1	1
Totals (24 entries)		16	16	32	64

== Men's events ==
=== Finweight (–50 kg) ===
Quarterfinals
Gergely Salim (DEN)	5
Chang Jung-San (TPE)	4
Paul Lyons (AUS)	0
Javier Argudo (ESP)	3
Narayan Gurung (NEP)	3
Juan Moreno (USA)	5
Hector Laureano (PUR)	2
Yefi Triaji (INA)	4

Semifinals
Gergely Salim (DEN)	5
Javier Argudo (ESP)	1
Juan Moreno (USA)	3
Yefi Triaji (INA)	-1

Finals
Gergely Salim (DEN)	3
Juan Moreno (USA)	1

=== Flyweight (50–54 kg) ===
Quarterfinals
Seo Sung-Kyo (KOR)	2
Luis Zuniga (MEX)	1
Arlindo Gouveia (VEN)	4
Thierry Dedegbe (FRA)	2
Dirc Talumewo (INA)	6
Firas Al-Jayousi (JOR)	4
Walter Vargas (PHI)	3
Wang Ming-Sung (TPE)	4

Semifinals
Seo Sung-Kyo (KOR)	3
Arlindo Gouveia (VEN)	4
Dirc Talumewo (INA)	WD
Wang Ming-Sung (TPE)

Finals
Arlindo Gouveia (VEN)	2
Dirc Talumewo (INA)	1

=== Bantamweight (54–58 kg) ===
Quarterfinals
William de Jesus Cordoba (MEX)	2
Josef Salim (DEN)	-1
Domenico D'Alise (ITA)	4
Angel Alonso (ESP)	3
Diego Yanez (CHI)	2
Stephen Fernández (PHI)	2
Lee Han Won (USA)	1
Sayed Youssef Najem (CAN)	2

Semifinals
William de Jesus Cordoba (MEX)	2
Domenico D'Alise (ITA)	1
Stephen Fernández (PHI)	-1
Sayed Youssef Najem (CAN)	0

Finals
William de Jesus Cordoba (MEX)	0
Sayed Youssef Najem (CAN)	0

=== Featherweight (58–64 kg) ===
Quarterfinals
Vitaly Bachiura (EUN)	1
Jung Woo Yong (CAN)	5
Kim Byong-Cheol (KOR)	4
Hironobu Yamashita (JPN)	0
Ekrem Boyali (TUR)	3
Carlos Rivas (VEN)	2
Spiridon Badas (GRE)	3
Luca Massaccesi (ITA)	5

Semifinals
Jung Woo Yong (CAN)	0
Kim Byong-Cheol (KOR)	2
Ekrem Boyali (TUR)	2
Luca Massaccesi (ITA)	1

Finals
Kim Byong-Cheol (KOR)	WD
Ekrem Boyali (TUR)

=== Lightweight (64–70 kg) ===
Quarterfinals
Musa Cicek (GER)	0
Chou Kuei-Ming (TPE)	3
Jose Santolaria (ESP)	5
Humberto Norambuena (CHI)	1
Fariborz Askari (IRI)	3
James Villasana (USA)	3
Djamel Khali (FRA)	4
Adel Saleh Al-Joban (BRN)	1

Semifinals
Chou Kuei-Ming (TPE)	0
Jose Santolaria (ESP)	4
Fariborz Askari (IRI)	3
Djamel Khali (FRA)	2

Finals
Jose Santolaria (ESP)	4
Fariborz Askari (IRI)	1

=== Welterweight (70–76 kg) ===
Quarterfinals
Mohammad Al-Qaimi (KUW)	3
Dragan Jurilj (CRO)	2
Dafejimue Adeogbeji (NGR)	-1
Ha Tae-Kyoung (KOR)	4
Reza Mehmandoust (IRI)	WD
Adel Hasan Ali (BRN)
Anthony DeCarlo (AUS)	2
Lee Jae Hun (CAN)	3

Semifinals
Mohammad Al-Qaimi (KUW)
Ha Tae-Kyoung (KOR)	WD
Reza Mehmandoust (IRI)
Lee Jae Hun (CAN)	WD

Finals
Ha Tae-Kyoung (KOR)	3
Lee Jae Hun (CAN)	2

=== Middleweight (76–83 kg) ===
Quarterfinals
Khaled Ibrahim (EGY)	3
Markus Woznicki (GER)	1
Juan Sous Godoy (ESP)	5
Anatoli Likhodievski (EUN)	0
Ammar Fahed Sbeihi (JOR)	3
Mansour Bagheri (IRI)	2
Herbert Perez (USA)	4
Metin Sahin (TUR)	3

Semifinals
Khaled Ibrahim (EGY)	4
Juan Sous Godoy (ESP)	4
Ammar Fahed Sbeihi (JOR)	0
Herbert Perez (USA)	1

Finals
Juan Sous Godoy (ESP)	2
Herbert Perez (USA)	3

=== Heavyweight (+83 kg) ===
Quarterfinals
Kim Je-Kyoung (KOR)	6
Oliver Schawe (GER)	1
Amr Hassan (EGY)	2
Tawfiq Nwaiser (JOR)	0
Ali Sahin (TUR)	3
Emmanuel Oghenejobo (NGR)	4
Simon Hosking (AUS)	0
Abdullah Daylem Farhan (KUW)	0

Semifinals
Kim Je-Kyoung (KOR)	3
Amr Hassan (EGY)	2
Emmanuel Oghenejobo (NGR)	6
Simon Hosking (AUS)	2

Finals
Kim Je-Kyoung (KOR)	3
Emmanuel Oghenejobo (NGR)	-1

== Women's events ==
=== Finweight (–43 kg) ===
Quarterfinals
Amanda Broadbent (GBR)	WD
Sita Rai (NEP)
Rahmi Kurnia (INA)	2
Helle Panzieri (DEN)	1
Mo Sun-Young (KOR)	3
Monica Torres (MEX)	3
Sabrina Agarbati (ITA)	3
Lo Yueh-Ying (TPE)	5

Semifinals
Amanda Broadbent (GBR)	2
Rahmi Kurnia (INA)	5
Monica Torres (MEX)
Lo Yueh-Ying (TPE)	WD

Finals
Rahmi Kurnia (INA)	4
Lo Yueh-Ying (TPE)	4

=== Flyweight (43–47 kg) ===
Quarterfinals
Kathy Walker (GBR)
Arzu Tan (TUR)	WD
Piera Muggiri (ITA)	1
Minako Hatakeyama (JPN)	1
Patricia Mariscal Alcalá (MEX)	3
Terry Poindexter (USA)	3
Elisabet Delgado (ESP)	4
Anita Falieros (AUS)	3

Semifinals
Arzu Tan (TUR)	1
Piera Muggiri (ITA)	1
Terry Poindexter (USA)	0
Elisabet Delgado (ESP)	2

Finals
Piera Muggiri (ITA)	0
Elisabet Delgado (ESP)	1

=== Bantamweight (47–51 kg) ===
Quarterfinals
Ivett Ayala (PUR)	1
Hwang Eun-Suk (KOR)	4
Anita Zeh Vendelboe (DEN)	0
Hii King Hung (MAS)	3
Diane Murray (USA)	1
Katherine Franklin (AUS)	0
Catherine Noble (FRA)	WD
Pramila Thapa (NEP)

Semifinals
Hwang Eun-Suk (KOR)	4
Hii King Hung (MAS)	2
Diane Murray (USA)	1
Catherine Noble (FRA)	1

Finals
Hwang Eun-Suk (KOR)	1
Diane Murray (USA)	1

=== Featherweight (51–55 kg) ===
Quarterfinals
Beatriz Lucero (PHI)	WD
Maria Zigmantovich (EUN)
Siauw Lung (INA)
Aysegul Ergin (TUR)	WD
Miet Filipovic (CRO)
Dolores Knoll (MEX)	WD
Tung Ya-Ling (TPE)	WD
Josefina Lopez (ESP)

Semifinals
Beatriz Lucero (PHI)	1
Aysegul Ergin (TUR)	2
Dolores Knoll (MEX)	1
Tung Ya-Ling (TPE)	2

Finals
Aysegul Ergin (TUR)	0
Tung Ya-Ling (TPE)	3

=== Lightweight (55–60 kg) ===
Quarterfinals
Chen Yi-An (TPE)	1
Sonny Seidel (GER)	1
Jeung Eun-Ok (KOR)	4
Ineabelle Díaz (PUR)	1
Hafida El Ouacef (MAR)	4
Miho Konno (JPN)	2
Judith Pirchmoser (AUT)	0
Susilawati (INA)	3

Semifinals
Chen Yi-An (TPE)	3
Jeung Eun-Ok (KOR)	1
Hafida El Ouacef (MAR)	0
Susilawati (INA)	3

Finals
Chen Yi-An (TPE)	WD
Susilawati (INA)

=== Welterweight (60–65 kg) ===
Quarterfinals
Eva Dinkhauser (AUT)
Brigitte Geffroy (FRA)	WD
Rahma Bahou (MAR)
Shelley Vettese-Baert (CAN)	WD
Jennifer Laney (USA)	1
Sarah Chung (MAS)	0
Maureen Bell (NZL)	0
Elena Benitez (ESP)	4

Semifinals
Brigitte Geffroy (FRA)	3
Shelley Vettese-Baert (CAN)	2
Jennifer Laney (USA)	0
Elena Benitez (ESP)	1

Finals
Brigitte Geffroy (FRA)
Elena Benitez (ESP)	WD

=== Middleweight (65–70 kg) ===
Quarterfinals
Mary Alindogan (PHI)
Lee Seon-hui (KOR)	WD
Denise Parmley (AUS)	2
Abbe Kivrik (TUR)	1
Anke Girg (GER)
Morfou Drosidou (GRE)	WD
Marcia King (CAN)	WD
Lamia Boulkacem (MAR)

Semifinals
Lee Seon-hui (KOR)	3
Denise Parmley (AUS)	2
Morfou Drosidou (GRE)	2
Marcia King (CAN)	3

Finals
Lee Seon-hui (KOR)	2
Marcia King (CAN)	0

=== Heavyweight (+70 kg) ===
Quarterfinals
Ala Bychenko (EUN)	2
Adriana Carmona (VEN)	2
Jenny Amador (PUR)	1
Susan Graham (NZL)	1
Bettina Hipf (GER)
Coral Bistuer Ruiz (ESP)	WD
Lynnette Love (USA)	WD
Angela Mitchell (CAN)

Semifinals
Adriana Carmona (VEN)	2
Susan Graham (NZL)	3
Coral Bistuer Ruiz (ESP)	0
Lynnette Love (USA)	0

Finals
Susan Graham (NZL)	-1
Coral Bistuer Ruiz (ESP)	1
