= Kim Byung-chul =

Kim Byung-chul (Korean: 김병철) is the name of:

- Kim Byong-cheol, South Korean taekwondo practitioner
- Byung Chul Kim (born 1974), South Korean artist
- Kim Byung-chul (born 1974), South Korean actor
- Kim Byung-chul (businessman) (born 1938), South Korean businessman
