= Turkey at the 1992 Summer Olympics =

- IOC code: TUR
- NOC: Turkish National Olympic Committee

in Barcelona
- Competitors: 41 in 10 sports
- Flag bearer: Kerem Ersü
- Medals Ranked 23rd: Gold 2 Silver 2 Bronze 2 Total 6

Summer Olympics appearances (overview)
- 1908; 1912; 1920; 1924; 1928; 1932; 1936; 1948; 1952; 1956; 1960; 1964; 1968; 1972; 1976; 1980; 1984; 1988; 1992; 1996; 2000; 2004; 2008; 2012; 2016; 2020; 2024

Other related appearances
- 1906 Intercalated Games

Turkey competed at the 1992 Summer Olympics in Barcelona, Spain.

== Medalists ==
Medal	Name	Sport	Event	Date
Gold	Naim Süleymanoğlu	Weightlifting	Men's 60 kg	28 July
Gold	Akif Pirim	Wrestling	Men's Greco-Roman 62 kg	30 July
Silver	Hakkı Başar	Wrestling	Men's Greco-Roman 90 kg	30 July
Silver	Kenan Şimşek	Wrestling	Men's freestyle 90 kg	7 August
Bronze	Hülya Şenyurt	Judo	Women's 48 kg	2 August
Bronze	Ali Kayali	Wrestling	Men's freestyle 100 kg	5 August

== Competitors ==
The following is the list of number of competitors in the Games.

Sport	Men	Women	Total
Archery	3	3	6
Athletics	2	0	2
Boxing	1	–	1
Judo	2	2	4
Rowing	1	0	1
Sailing	2	0	2
Shooting	1	0	1
Swimming	3	0	3
Weightlifting	6	–	6
Wrestling	15	–	15
Total	36	5	41

== Results by event ==
=== Archery ===
In its third Olympic archery competition, Turkey's women were much more successful than the men. The ladies were able to earn a top eight finish in the team round.

Women's Individual Competition:

- Natalia Nasaridze — Round of 16, 15th place (1-1)
- Zehra Oktem — Round of 32, 30th place (0-1)
- Elif Eksi — Ranking round, 39th place (0-0)

Men's Individual Competition:

- Kerem Ersu — Ranking round, 46th place (0-0)
- Vedat Erbay — Ranking round, 50th place (0-0)
- Ozcan Ediz — Ranking round, 59th place (0-0)

Women's Team Competition:

- Nasaridze, Oktem, and Eksi — Quarterfinal, 6th place (1-1)

Men's Team Competition:

- Ersu, Erbay, and Ediz — Ranking round, 18th place

=== Athletics ===
- Zeki Öztürk
- Alper Kasapoğlu

=== Boxing ===
- Mehmet Gürgen

=== Judo ===
==== Men's Competition ====
- Haldun Efemgül (– 69 kg)
- Alpaslan Ayan (– 71 kg)

==== Women's Competition ====
- Hülya Şenyurt (– 48 kg)
- Derya Çalışkan (– 52 kg)

=== Sailing ===
Men's Sailboard (Lechner A-390)

- Kutlu Torunlar

- Final Ranking — 310.0 points (→ 32nd place)

=== Swimming ===
Men's 100m Freestyle

- Mehmet Uğur Taner
  1. Heat — 51.34 (→ did not advance, 27th place)

Men's 200m Freestyle

- Mehmet Uğur Taner
  1. Heat — 1:50.95 (→ did not advance, 20th place)

Men's 400m Freestyle

- Mehmet Uğur Taner
  1. Heat — 3:57.64 (→ did not advance, 23rd place)
- Can Ergenekan
  1. Heat — 3:58.43 (→ did not advance, 25th place)

Men's 100m Backstroke

- Derya Büyükuncu
  1. Heat — 57.38 (→ did not advance, 22nd place)

Men's 200m Backstroke

- Derya Büyükuncu
  1. Heat — 2:06.01 (→ did not advance, 33rd place)

Men's 100m Butterfly

- Mehmet Uğur Taner
  1. Heat — 55.31 (→ did not advance, 24th place)
- Can Ergenekan
  1. Heat — 56.30 (→ did not advance, 38th place)

Men's 200m Butterfly

- Can Ergenekan
  1. Heat — 2:00.82
  2. B-Final – 2:01.21 (→ 12th place)
- Mehmet Uğur Taner
  1. Heat — 2:01.61 (→ did not advance, 23rd place)

=== Taekwondo ===
- Ekrem Boyali
- Ali Şahin
- Metin Şahin
- Arzu Tan
- Ayşegül Ergin
- Abbe Kivrik

=== Weightlifting ===
- Halil Mutlu (– 52 kg)
- Hafız Süleymanoğlu (– 56 kg)
- Naim Süleymanoğlu (– 60 kg)
- Muharrem Süleymanoğlu (– 75 kg)
- Sunay Bulut (– 82,5 kg)
- Erdinç Aslan (– 110 kg)

=== Wrestling ===
==== Freestyle ====
- Ahmet Orel (– 52 kg)
- Remzi Musaoğlu (– 57 kg)
- Ismail Faikoğlu (– 62 kg)
- Fatih Özbaş (– 68 kg)
- Selahattin Yiğit (– 74 kg)
- Sebahattin Öztürk (– 82 kg)
- Kenan Şimşek (– 90 kg)
- Ali Kayali (– 100 kg)
- Mahmut Demir (– 130 kg)

==== Greco-Roman ====
- Ömer Elmas (– 48 kg)
- Remzi Öztürk (– 52 kg)
- Ergüder Bekişdamat (– 57 kg)
- Mehmet Akif Pirim (– 62 kg)
- Erhan Balci (– 74 kg)
- Hakkı Başar (– 90 kg)
