= Zeynep Murat =

Turkish taekwondo practitioner

Zeynep Murat Duran
Personal information
- Nationality: Turkish
- Born: Zeynep Murat; September 15, 1983 (age 42) Kayseri, Turkey

Sport
- Country: Turkey
- Sport: Taekwondo
- Club: İstanbul Büyükşehir Belediyesi S.K.
- Coached by: Arzu Tan
Medal record
Women's Taekwondo
Representing Turkey
World Championships
| Silver medal – second place | 2005 Madrid | Bantamweight |
| Bronze medal – third place | 2001 Jeju City | Featherweight |
World Cup
| Silver medal – second place | 2001 Ho Chi Minh City | Featherweight |
| Gold medal – first place | 2000 Lyon | Bantamweight |
European Championships
| Silver medal – second place | 2005 Riga | Bantamweight |
| Gold medal – first place | 2004 Lillehammer | Bantamweight |
| Bronze medal – third place | 2002 Samsun | Featherweight |
| Bronze medal – third place | 2000 Patras | Featherweight |
Summer Universiade
| Gold medal – first place | 2005 İzmir | Bantamweight |

Zeynep Murat Duran (born Zeynep Murat on September 15, 1983) is a European champion Turkish female Taekwondo practitioner. She is a member of İstanbul Büyükşehir Belediyesi S.K.

Murat was born in Kayseri, Turkey. She studied physical education and sports at Erciyes University in her hometown.

At age 13, she began practising with the initiative of her father Mehmet Murat, who wanted her to become courageous. She was coached in the beginning for about one year by Arzu Tan, a former world champion.

Murat took part at the 2000 Korean Open Tournament in Chuncheon, at which she won the gold medal in the juniors category and was named "Most Technical Junior Woman Athlete". She took a gold medal at the 2000 World Cup in Lyon, France. In 2004, she became the European champion in Lillehammer, Norway. She won the silver medal at the 2005 World Taekwondo Championships in Madrid, Spain. The same year, she won another silver medal at the European Championships held in Riga, Latvia.

In 2007, Murat became again Turkish champion.

== Achievements ==
- (gold) 2000 World Cup - Lyon, France - 55 kg
- (bronze) 2000 Spanish Open - Valencia, Spain - 55 kg (junior)
- (bronze) 2000 European Championships - Patras, Greece - 59 kg
- (silver) 2000 Balkan Championships - Athens, Greece - 51 kg
- (gold) 2000 Korea Open - Chuncheon, South Korea - 55 kg (junior)
- (bronze) 2000 World Juniors and Youth Championships - Killarney, Ireland - 55 kg (youth)
- (silver) 2001 World Cup - Ho Chi Minh City, Vietnam - 59 kg youth
- (bronze) 2001 World Championships - Jeju City, South Korea - 59 kg
- (bronze) 2002 European Championships - Samsun, Turkey - 59 kg
- (gold) 2004 European Championships - Lillehammer, Norway - 59 kg
- (bronze) 2005 German Open - Bonn, Germany - 55 kg
- (silver) 2005 World Championships - Madrid, Spain - 55 kg
- (gold) 2005 Summer Universiade - İzmir, Turkey - 55 kg
- (silver) 2005 European Championships - Riga, Latvia - 55 kg
- (bronze) 2006 German Open - Bonn, Germany - 59 kg
