= Herbert Perez =

American taekwondo practitioner

Herbert J. Perez
- Born: December 6, 1959 (age 66); New York City
- Other names: Olympus
- Nationality: American
- Weight: 83 kg (183 lb; 13 st 1 lb)
- Style: Taekwondo
- Rank: 9th degree black belt in taekwondo

Other information
- University: William Paterson University (BA), University of Lyon (MA)
- Notable school: Gold Medal Martial Arts
Medal record
Men's taekwondo
Representing United States
Olympic Games (demonstration)
Gold medal – first place	1992 Barcelona	middleweight
Pan American Games
Silver medal – second place	1991 Havana	middleweight
Gold medal – first place	1987 Indianapolis	middleweight
World Championships
Bronze medal – third place	1991 Athens	middleweight
Bronze medal – third place	1987 Barcelona	middleweight
World Cup
Gold medal – first place	1987 Helsinki	middleweight

Councilmember of Foster City
- Recalled
- In office 2011–2020

Mayor of Foster City
- In office 2014–2015

Vice Mayor of Foster City
- Recalled
- In office 2018–2020
- Succeeded by: Jon Froomin

Herbert J. "Herb" Perez (born December 6, 1959) is a former US Olympian in taekwondo and a politician. He was a gold medalist in the 1992 Barcelona Olympics.

== Personal life ==
Perez was born in New York City to a Polish mother and a Puerto Rican father. He attended Rutgers Law School. He did his undergraduate degree at William Paterson University and earned a master's degree in sport organization management from the International Olympic Committee's program at the University of Lyon, France. Perez became a city councilman and mayor for Foster City, California, where he is the owner of Gold Medal Martial Arts. He has earned his ninth degree black belt in taekwondo. He served as chairman for the World Taekwondo Federation Education Committee and Vice Chair of the World Taekwondo Federation Technical Committee along with Steven Capener. Together they created and implemented the multi-tiered scoring system in place today along with the video review protocol.

== Martial arts ==
Perez won bronze medals at both the 1987 and 1991 World Taekwondo Championships, and won the 1987 World Cup Championships in Helsinki. He was involved in a scoring controversy as the head of the Taekwondo team at the 2008 Summer Olympics.

He starred as himself (with the nickname "Olympus") on the martial arts TV series WMAC Masters from 1995 to 1997.

Herb Perez became a prominent critic of electronic scoring in the 2016 Summer Olympics taekwondo competition. His career and criticism were highlighted in a feature story in the September 2016 issue of Tae Kwon Do Life Magazine called "Herb Perez: Modern Renaissance Man".

== Political career ==
Perez was elected to the council of the City of Foster City in 2011. He was re-elected for another four-year term on November 3, 2015. He briefly served as Mayor and Vice-Mayor before being recalled on March 3, 2020, in the California Primary elections. Retired Police Chief and longtime Foster City resident Jon Froomin was selected to replace Perez on the council until the term for his seat expires in November 2020.
