= Arlene Limas =

American taekwondo practitioner

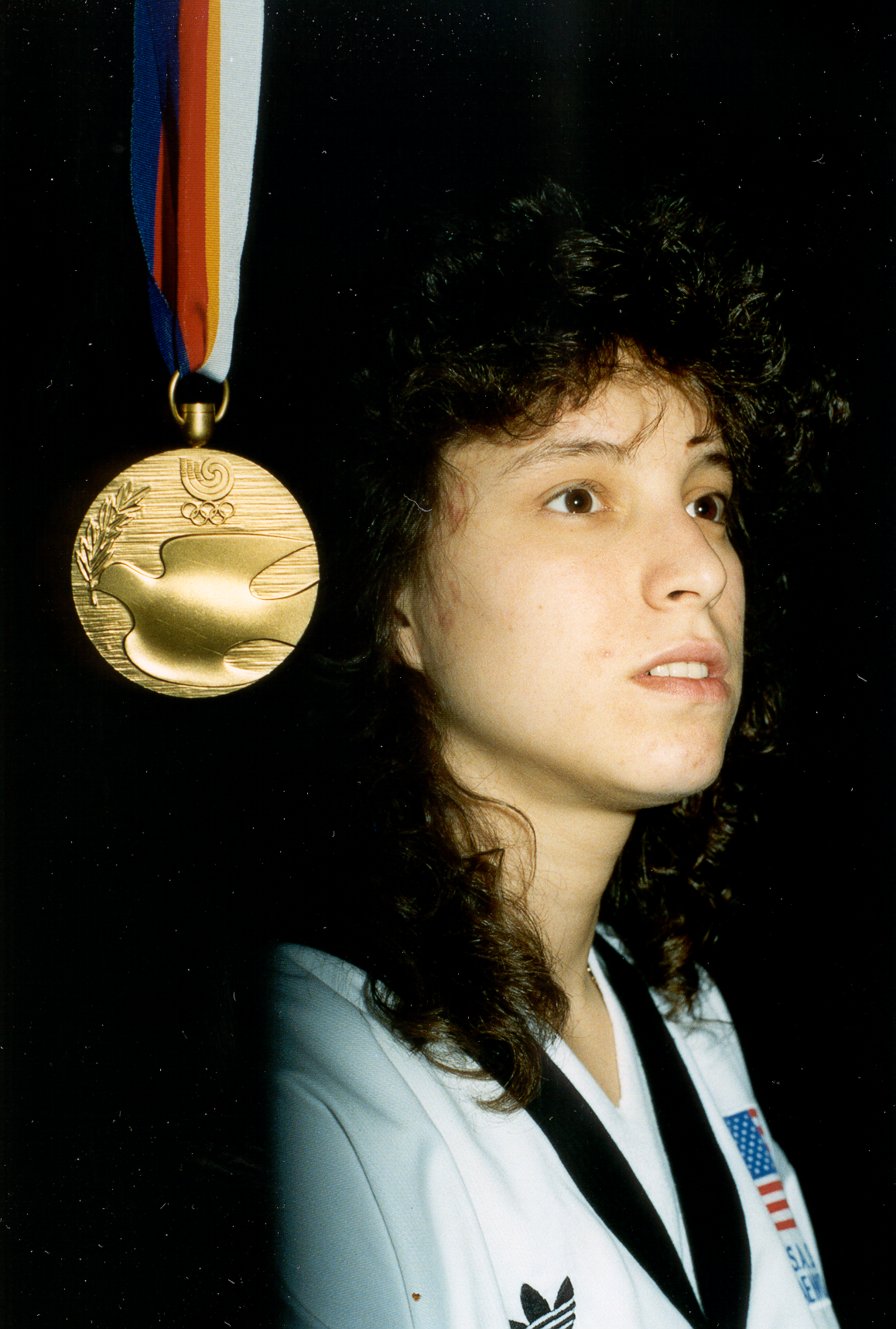

Personal information
- Born: February 9, 1966 (age 60) United States
- Education: De Paul University (1990)
Medal record
Women's Taekwondo
Representing the United States
Olympic Games (demonstration)
Gold medal – first place	1988 Seoul	Welterweight (60–65 kg)
World Championships
Gold medal – first place	1991 Athens	Welterweight

Arlene Limas (born February 9, 1966) is an American taekwondo practitioner and multiple international gold medalist of Mexican and Polish descent.

== Early life and education ==
Limas graduated with honors from Whitney Young Magnet High School in Chicago and studied political science at De Paul University in 1990.

== Career ==
Limas began her martial arts training in Shaolin kung fu at age 5 before starting taekwondo at age 8. At the age of 15 she began competing in Sport Karate, where she was known as "Lady Kung Fu". She was a top ranked point fighter winning the Diamond Nationals in 1983 and 1986. In 1989 she was inducted into the Diamond Nationals Hall of Fame. She was also known for her competitive rivalry with Linda Denley.

Limas then transitioned to taekwondo competition, taking 1st in the 1986 the US Collegiate National Taekwondo Championship, and winning gold in the World University Taekwondo Championships. In 1987 Limas took 1st at the National Collegiate Taekwondo Championships. Limas had to appear before an International Olympic Committee board to request to participate in the 1988 Olympics because she had previously been paid to fight in sport karate events. Limas made history when she became the first American to win a gold medal at the 24th Olympic Games in Seoul, Korea in taekwondo, which made its Olympic debut as an exhibition sport.

In 1989 Limas won the US Collegiate National Taekwondo Championship. In 1990 Limas took gold at the World University Taekwondo Championships, took 1st at the National Taekwondo Championships, and took gold at the Pan American Taekwondo Championships. In 1991 Limas took gold at the World Taekwondo Championships, took 1st at the US National Taekwondo Team Trials, and took 1st at the US Olympic Festival. Limas sued the United States Taekwondo Union for a chance to fight Danielle Laney for a spot on the 1992 Olympic team, but lost her bout with Laney. Limas retired from competition in 1992 and opened up her own martial arts school "Power Kix Martial Arts" in Stafford, Virginia.

In 1998 Limas made a comeback and won the US National Taekwondo Championship. She was an Olympic hopeful for the 2000 Olympics, having won the 1999 US National Team Trials, but she failed to qualify and retired after 29 years of competition. Limas is a member of the Taekwondo Hall of Fame. Limas was inducted June 20, 2019 into the National Polish-American Sports Hall of Fame located in Troy, Michigan.

== Career achievements ==
- 1986 - World University Championships, Gold Medalist (Berkeley, California)
- 1987 - National Championships Gold Medalist
- 1988 - Olympic Team Member (Tae Kwon Do)
- 1988 - Olympic Gold Medalist - Welterweight Division, Seoul, Korea
- 1990 - National Championships Gold Medalist
- 1989, 1990 - Olympic Sports Festival Captain (West Team) and gold medalist
- 1990 - Pan-Am Tae Kwon Do Championships (Puerto Rico) Gold Medalist
- 1990 - World University Games (Spain) Team Captain & Gold Medalist
- 1990 - World Cup Gold Medalist (Spain)
- 1991 - National Championships Welterweight Gold Medalist
- 1991 - Olympic Festival Gold Medalist
- 1991 - World Championships Gold Medalist (Athens, Greece)
- 1989 - National Championships Gold Medalist
- 1998 - U.S. Team Trials Silver Medalist
- 1998 - Olympic Weight Division Qualifier Gold Medalist
- 1998 - Choson Cup Olympic Weight Division Invitational Gold Medalist, (Australia)
- 1998 - Pan Am Games Team Trials Silver Medalist
- 1999 - U.S. Team Trials Gold Medalist

== Career honors ==
- 2007 - Taekwondo Hall of Fame
- 1987 - Collegiate Athlete of the Year
- 1989 - March of Dimes Amateur Athlete of the Year
- 1989 - Named "Woman of Vision" - Latin Women's Organization for Business Professional Involvement
- 1991 - U. S. Taekwondo Union "Woman of the Year"
- 2000 - Selected as one of the top TKD fighters of the 20th century by TKD Times and Martial Arts Illustrated
- 2011 - Owner and founder of "Power Kix Martial Arts" Tae Kwon Do studio in Stafford, Virginia
