= Kim Je-kyoung =

South Korean taekwondo practitioner

Medal record

Men's taekwondo

Representing South Korea

World Championship
Gold medal – first place	1993 New York	Heavyweight
Gold medal – first place	1995 Manila	Heavyweight
Gold medal – first place	1997 Hong Kong	Heavyweight

Asian Games
Gold medal – first place	1994 Hiroshima	Heavyweight
Gold medal – first place	1998 Bangkok	Heavyweight

Asian Championships
Gold medal – first place	1992 Kuala Lumpur	Heavyweight

Kim Je-kyoung (also romanized as Kim Je-gyoung) is a retired taekwondo athlete born on 10 November 1970. He was the 1992 Summer Olympic gold medalist in taekwondo. At the 1992 Summer Olympics, taekwondo was a demonstration sport. Kim won the final match in the heavyweight division for South Korea. Kim also took the gold medal at the 11th, 12th and 13th Taekwondo World Championships 1993, 1995 and 1997 in New York, Manila and Hong Kong, respectively.

== Youth ==
His father died from an accident when he was a high school student. He received his BA at Dong-a University in Busan, South Korea in 1991.

== Career ==
He was a Korean National Team Member for ten years, from 1991 to 2000, during which time he won the World Championship three times and swept all other international championships such as the Asia Championship, Asian Games, and World Cup. He was dubbed the prince of taekwondo in the 1990s due to his accuracy, careful game management, and his fast, powerful spinning kick. He was well known for taking care of himself, his training and his teammates.

In 2000, Kim qualified for the South Korean Taekwondo Olympic team during the first assessment tournament, but an injury sustained at the 1998 Asian Games became horribly aggravated and forced him to withdraw from the second assessment tournament.

== Retirement ==
Kim retired from competitive taekwondo in October 2000. Seven month after his retirement, on June 3, 2001, Kim appeared in a special tournament: Olympic medalists v. world champions; although, Kim is both an Olympic medalist and a world champion, he competed on the 5-man team representing world champions. Kim was victorious in the final match of the tournament, but his team did not prevail against the Olympic medalists.

After his retirement, Kim immigrated to the United States and opened school in a Lake Oswego, Oregon called World Champion Taekwondo. As of 2009, Kim works with his former Olympic teammate Kim Byong-Cheol at the World Champion Taekwondo School, with locations in Portland, Beaverton, Lake Oswego and Scappoose.
