= 1992 European Taekwondo Championships =

Taekwondo competition

- Location: Valencia, Spain
- Start date: 18 May
- End date: 25 May

The 1992 European Taekwondo Championships were held in Valencia, Spain. The event took place from 18 to 25 May, 1992.

== Medals table ==
* Host nation (Spain)

Rank	Nation	Gold	Silver	Bronze	Total
1	Spain*	6	3	3	12
2	Germany	3	1	5	9
3	Turkey	2	7	3	12
4	Denmark	2	2	5	9
5	France	2	0	4	6
6	Italy	1	0	1	2
7	Greece	0	1	3	4
7	Sweden	0	1	3	4
9	Netherlands	0	1	1	2
10	Austria	0	0	1	1
10	Croatia	0	0	1	1
10	Great Britain	0	0	1	1
10	Hungary	0	0	1	1
Totals (13 entries)		16	16	32	64

== Medal summary ==
=== Men ===
Event	Gold	Silver	Bronze
50 kg	Gergely Salim; Denmark	Harun Ateş; Turkey	Javier Argudo; Spain
50 kg	Gergely Salim; Denmark	Harun Ateş; Turkey	Vito Toraldo; Italy
54 kg	Gabriel Esparza; Spain	Abror Haider; Denmark	Sedat Berkdemir; Turkey
54 kg	Gabriel Esparza; Spain	Abror Haider; Denmark	Marc Wennmann; Germany
58 kg	Josef Salim; Denmark	Kadir Yağız; Turkey	Ángel Alonso; Spain
58 kg	Josef Salim; Denmark	Kadir Yağız; Turkey	Leonard Glasnovic; Sweden
64 kg	Musa Çiçek; Germany	Ekrem Boyalı; Turkey	Spyros Badas; Greece
64 kg	Musa Çiçek; Germany	Ekrem Boyalı; Turkey	Youssef Lharraki; Denmark
70 kg	José Santolaria; Spain	Mustafa Elmalı; Turkey	John Kelly; Great Britain
70 kg	José Santolaria; Spain	Mustafa Elmalı; Turkey	Ercan Özkuru; Germany
76 kg	Marcello Pezzolla; Italy	Antonio Pérez Acevedo; Spain	Eric Haeljcio; France
76 kg	Marcello Pezzolla; Italy	Antonio Pérez Acevedo; Spain	Sten Knuth; Denmark
83 kg	Mikaël Meloul; France	Ivan Brljevic; Sweden	Jos Bouwhuis; Netherlands
83 kg	Mikaël Meloul; France	Ivan Brljevic; Sweden	Marcus Nitschke; Germany
+83 kg	Oliver Schawe; Germany	José Luis Álvarez; Spain	Cezmi Kızılay; Turkey
+83 kg	Oliver Schawe; Germany	José Luis Álvarez; Spain	Ivan Radoš; Croatia

=== Women ===
Event	Gold	Silver	Bronze
43 kg	Gülnur Yerlisu; Turkey	Helle Panzieri; Denmark	Edurne Berrio; Spain
43 kg	Gülnur Yerlisu; Turkey	Helle Panzieri; Denmark	Jolanthe Broll; Germany
47 kg	Elisabet Delgado; Spain	Arzu Tan; Turkey	Christelle Hjamdu; France
47 kg	Elisabet Delgado; Spain	Arzu Tan; Turkey	Kristina Persson; Sweden
51 kg	Rosário Solis; Spain	Döndü Şahin; Turkey	Trine Nielsen; Denmark
51 kg	Rosário Solis; Spain	Döndü Şahin; Turkey	Cathrin Vetter; Germany
55 kg	Nuray Deliktaş; Turkey	Josefina López; Spain	Stéphanie Dhaeye; France
55 kg	Nuray Deliktaş; Turkey	Josefina López; Spain	Marianna Engrich; Hungary
60 kg	Patricia Reynolds; France	Minouchka Thielmann; Netherlands	Judith Pirchmoser; Austria
60 kg	Patricia Reynolds; France	Minouchka Thielmann; Netherlands	Karn Schwartz; Denmark
65 kg	Sonny Seidel; Germany	Morfu Drosidou; Greece	Brigitte Gefroy; France
65 kg	Sonny Seidel; Germany	Morfu Drosidou; Greece	Hellen Jakobsen; Denmark
70 kg	Coral Bistuer; Spain	Anke Girg; Germany	Ayda Kendi; Turkey
70 kg	Coral Bistuer; Spain	Anke Girg; Germany	Theano Ketesidou; Greece
+70 kg	Sandra Martín; Spain	Abbe Kıvrık; Turkey	Gethimani Orfanidou; Greece
+70 kg	Sandra Martín; Spain	Abbe Kıvrık; Turkey	Anna Widehov; Sweden
