= The Guard Post =

G.P. 506
- Directed by: Kong Su-chang
- Written by: Kong Su-chang
- Music by: Choi Seung-hyun
- Release date: April 3, 2008
- Running time: 123 minutes
- Country: South Korea
- Language: Korean
- Box office: $6,376,664

The Guard Post (GP 506 in South Korea) is a 2008 Korean horror film written and directed by Kong Su-chang.

== Plot ==
Sergeant Major Seong-gyu Noh, along with a friend in the army, are paying their last respects to Noh's wife. Later, in their car, Noh's friend informs him of an assignment that the military has ordered him to do: head to Guard Post 506 in the Korean DMZ to investigate a strange incident there.

At 21:07, Noh arrives at GP 506 about an hour later. On the way to the office, he passes a boiler room that has words written in blood on the wall, which says: "Kill all of them." He is brought to the recreation room where the bodies were found, and watches in shock at the amount of blood splattered around the room.

In the present, Noh checks the guard post's records and notices that someone has been controlling the weapons lately. All personal weapons were kept in the armory and not in the barracks, which was unusual. One of the soldiers reports to Noh, informing him that they have found another survivor, inside the generator room. This survivor portrays himself as Yoo.

Noh reports to his superior on the phone, who wants him to bring Yoo back, despite his objections as the investigation has not been completed yet and will be forced to end once the clean up crew arrives in the morning. Noh refuses to listen anymore to his superior and ends the call. He then goes off to look for Yoo at the canteen, only to find he's not there.

Noh reads Kang's personal records that he was a troublemaker, but he thinks that Kang doesn't look like one who would go insane and embark on a killing spree. He pores over Yoo's journal.

In the present, Doc returns with the bodies and Cpl. Kang lapses into critical condition. Despite Doc's attempts such as defibrillation to resuscitate him, Kang dies. As they talk, Kim supposedly saw the dark silhouette of what he thinks is Sergeant Ma walking towards the medic room where they were. He went hysterical and pointed the shadow out to Yoo. Yoo passes out and on waking, finds Kim dead. He then confiscates all ammunition and live ordinance.

In the present, Doc is unable to find any cold medicine in the post first aid room which supposedly should have sufficient amounts of it. Meanwhile, Cpl. Kwak and his buddy are sent for sentry duty. Men start to notice a red rash appearing on their bodies.

In a matter of hours, the disease that inflicted the men of 506 will be present in the new men as well. Doc surmises that a rabies-like virus infects the men, making them turn violent and kill each other, but he does not know how the infection spreads. Moreover, it has remission period, in which all the rashes have disappeared and consciousness is back to normal, like perfectly normal healthy men, but ironically that period is most dangerous. After elapsing multiple remission periods, the rashes appear all around the body and even pours out abscesses, thus becoming very violent.

As Noh goes through some clues in the diary, he suddenly discovers that the soldier they've interviewed is actually a medic, not Lieutenant Yoo.

In another flashback where the medic sneaked into the ambulance to see the deceased Kang, it is finally revealed that the medic was lying about everything. Kim was actually killed by Lieutenant Yoo and Yoo was the one who had gone out to the forest with the others, not Sergeant Ma. However, Lt. Yoo made the medic rewrite his report to mislead the higher officials about his wrongdoing.

As Kwon leaves the ambulance, he is suddenly spotted by a soldier and kills him after noticing the soldier turned into a zombie type monster. Kwon tries to escape the post, but crashes into the barriers after Noh started shooting at the ambulance Kwon was driving. Kwon gets arrested again after Noh discovers his true identity. However, the deceased soldier on the ground starts attacking one of the soldiers, despite being ripped in half. Noh shoots at the deceased soldier multiple times, but only kills him with a headshot. Kwon gets tied up and thinks back to the time where the real Yoo was blamed for infecting the entire platoon with the mysterious virus.

Noh, Doc, 1st Lt. Bang and the sergeants gather the remaining men for an inspection due to the disease. Doc divides up the men according to whether they have the rashes on their bodies. However, when Noh orders the infected to strip their weapons and hand them over, they refuse and the soldiers present have a standoff. Meanwhile, Kwon, tied up in the generator room, struggles with his bonds and knocks out the electric supply temporarily, blacking out the bunker.

Noh, upon learning the truth from Kwon, beats him up in anger, due to him withholding the truth and his own selfish reasons of wanting to live, have caused his own men and Noh's group to die. Kwon retorts back, saying that HQ did not care about them when they were dying like mad dogs here. Later, while staring at the rain outside, Noh touches his family photo and comes to a terrible resolution: He decided to kill everyone alive including himself to stop the virus. However, Doc stands against Noh saying it is genocide, but Noh rolls up his sleeves and discovers Doc is infected, and Noh is infected as well. He goes into the office and finds the keys to the bunker. When leaving, he hears sobbing sounds from a corner, to find Sergeant Yoon. He discovers Yoon is infected and shoots him. Later, he also heads to Kwon, eventually killing him at 05:56.

Lee orders the men to look for Noh, who is busy spilling kerosene all around the rooms, passageways and corridors of the bunker. At 06:25, Noh spills all the remaining kerosene around the shower room. Shortly after, Lee and the soldiers manage to corner Noh in the shower room. Unable to kill Noh, Lee wants him to join them and deny that the disease ever happened.

As Doc interferes the standoff, Noh and Doc manages to kill 3 of the men, with Noh injured. Doc runs out of ammo in the end and is shot to death by Lee. Eventually, only one Private is survived and as he opens the door to escape GP 506, his act triggered the booby trap installed by Noh, killing him and ravaging the area with explosion and fire. At 06:57, The soldiers approaching the bunker instantly drop to the ground for safety, while GP 506 has turned into a smoking ruin.

The movie then focuses with the last recording made by Corporal Kang explaining about the virus and the disease, as well as the way to solve the disaster: killing everyone alive in the 506. It ends with the scene in which he brings the cake topped with burning candles to the barrack, and soon after shooting with his gun to kill everyone.

== Cast ==
- Chun Ho-jin as Sergeant Major Noh Seong-gyu
- Lee Yeong-hoon as Corporal Kang Jin-won
- Kim Byung-chul as Staff Sgt. Yoon
- Son Byong-ho as Colonel Park
- Cho Jin-woong as Cook
- Lee Jeong-heon as Doctor (Surgeon)
- Kim Sung-bum as Choi Il-byeong
- Park Won-sang
- Jo Hyun-jae as 1st Lieutenant Yoo Jeong-wu / Corporal Kwon Jeong-min

== Reception ==
A review from Twitch said that The Guard Post is not as strong as Kong's first Korean horror film R-Point as the depiction of flashbacks and the present was confusing, though the story was interesting. Screen Daily notes that The Guard Post is similar to Park Chan-wook's film Joint Security Area but with an emphasis on horror rather than geopolitics.

However, it is recommended for its well-defined plot which is rare to zombie films and its well-rounded characters and slick production values.

The film had box-office admissions of 945,185 playing on 355 screens worldwide.

== Awards and nominations ==
2008 Buil Film Awards

- Nomination – Best Editing – Shin Min-kyung
- Nomination – Best Lighting – Yoon Dong-woo
- Nomination – Technical Award – Kim Dong-won (Special Effects)

2008 Grand Bell Awards

- Nomination – Best Visual Effects – Kim Dong-won

2008 Blue Dragon Film Awards

- Nomination – Best New Actor – Lee Yeong-hoon
- Nomination – Technical Award – Lee Chang-man (Special Make-up)

2008 Korean Film Awards

- Nomination – Best Art Direction – Jang Chun-seob
- Nomination – Best New Actor – Lee Yeong-hoon
