= Gergely Salim =

Danish/Hungarian taekwondo practitioner

Personal information
- Born: 1 April 1972 (age 54) Dar-es-Salaam, Tanzania
Medal record
Men's taekwondo
Representing Denmark
Olympic Games (demonstration)
Gold medal – first place	1992 Barcelona	50 kg
World Championships
Gold medal – first place	1991 Athens	50 kg
Silver medal – second place	1993 New York	50 kg
European Championships
Gold medal – first place	1990 Aarhus	50 kg
Gold medal – first place	1992 Valencia	50 kg
Gold medal – first place	1994 Zagreb	50 kg
European Junior Championships
Gold medal – first place	1988 Ankara	45 kg
Representing Hungary
World Championships
Bronze medal – third place	1995 Manila	54 kg

Gergely Salim (born 1 April 1972 in Dar-es-Salaam, Tanzania) is a Hungarian-Danish taekwondo practitioner, but lives now in Los Angeles as an American citizen.

== Career ==
He started practicing taekwondo at the age of 8 with his oldest brother, Joseph Salim, at Gladsaxe Taekwondo Klub near Copenhagen.

In 1991, Gergely Salim won a gold medal in the finweight division at the World Taekwondo Championships in Athens. Next year, at the age of 20, he participated in the 1992 Summer Olympics in Barcelona and won first place. He also won three consecutive European Championships from 1990 to 1994 for the Danish national team.

Joseph also pursued a great career in the sport as he also was a 3-time european champion and runner-up at the 1991 world championship.

== Personal life ==
Salim was born in Tanzania to a Tanzanian father and Hungarian mother. He moved to Denmark at a young age.

In 2021, Salim's youngest son, Omar Salim, won the gold medal at the 2021 European Taekwondo Championships representing Hungary. His daughter, Kamilah Salim, is also a taekwondo competitor, who also competes in steeplechase.
