= Excavator (film) =

- Theatrical poster
- Hangul: 포크레인
- Lit.: Fork Crane
- RR: Pokeurein
- MR: P'ok'ŭrein
- Directed by: Lee Ju-hyoung
- Written by: Kim Ki-duk
- Produced by: Kim Ki-duk
- Starring: Uhm Tae-woong
- Production company: Kim Ki-duk Film
- Release date: July 27, 2017 (South Korea)
- Running time: 92 minutes
- Country: South Korea
- Language: Korean

Excavator (Korean: 포크레인; lit. 'Fork crane') is a 2017 South Korean drama film written by Kim Ki-duk and directed by Lee Ju-hyoung.

== Plot ==
Kim Gang-il, a paratrooper who was mobilized to suppress the demonstrations during the May 18th Gwangju Democratization Movement, is working as en excavator driver after his retirement. Subsequently, he uncovers findings that will reveal an inconvenient truth from twenty years prior.

== Cast ==
- Uhm Tae-woong as Kim Gang-il
- Kim Kyung-ik as Farmer sibling
- Shim Jung-wan as Coast sibling
- Jung Se-hyung as Teller sibling/Airborne unit member 4
- Jo Duk-je as Staff sergeant Jang
- Jo Yeong-jin as First sergeant
- Park Se-joon as Platoon leader
- Kim Jung-pal as Company commander
- Jo Won-hee as Battalion commander
- Sin Chang-soo as Division commander
- Son Byong-ho as Member of National Assembly
- Son Jin-hwan as Brigade commander
- Sin Hee-moon as Police constable Oh
- Han In-gyoo as Kim Sang-kyeong
- Jeong In-tae as Soldier on a leave
- Park Jeong-geun as Soldier's friend
- Ryu Sung-rok as Student demonstrator
