= The Ring Virus =

1999 horror film

- Theatrical release poster
- Hangul: 링
- RR: Ring
- MR: Ring
- Directed by: Kim Dong-bin
- Written by: Kim Dong-bin; Kong Su-chang
- Based on: Ring by Kôji Suzuki
- Produced by: Jonathan Kim
- Starring: Shin Eun-kyung; Jung Jin-young; Kim Chang-wan; Bae Doona
- Cinematography: Hwang Chul-hyun
- Edited by: Kyung Min-ho
- Music by: Il Won
- Release date: 12 June 1999
- Running time: 108 minutes
- Country: South Korea
- Language: Korean

The Ring Virus (Korean: 링; RR: Ring) is a 1999 South Korean horror film adapted from the Japanese novel Ring by Koji Suzuki. A joint project between Japan and Korea, this version has Park Eun-Suh as the creator of the cursed videotape. Although the filmmakers claimed that the film was adapted from the novel only, it differs from the novel in some ways that match the 1998 film Ring (also known as Ringu in the US), such as having a female lead character, and several scenes were directly copied, including some of the scenes on the videotape and the film's climax.

At the time of the film's production, South Korea had placed a ban on Japanese cultural imports, which would have prevented Ring from being released in the country. The Ring Virus was commissioned as a remake for the South Korean market. By late 1998 the ban had been lifted, however production for the film had already progressed to near completion, and the film was released on 12 June 1999.

== Plot ==
Teenager Sang-Mi dies mysteriously at her home at the same time as three of her friends. Her aunt, journalist Sun-Joo, discovers that the four teenagers all stayed the night at a hotel resort, and decides to investigate further. Following a cryptic message on Sang-Mi's pager and a note left in the resort's guestbook, Sun-Joo encounters an unmarked videotape and watches it. The video contains strange, seemingly unrelated imagery, including shots of a tidal wave and an old woman talking in a thick dialect, ending with a shot of an old well and a message claiming that anyone who watches the tape will die one week later. The rest of the tape has been overwritten. After Sun-Joo watches the tape, she receives a phonecall, hearing not a voice but the same music box-type music that was present on the tape.

Sun-Joo visits Dr. Choi-Yeol, the pathologist who autopsied the four teens, and shows him the tape, making him a copy in the process. Together, the two begin tracking down the tape's origin and thus the cure to the death curse. The scenes in the tape lead them to believe that it was created not by a camera but by a human mind using psychic powers. Their research leads them to uncover the record of Park Eun-Suh, a gifted psychic. Meanwhile, Sun-Joo's daughter Boram watches the tape, giving Sun-Joo even more impetus to solve the curse.

Sun-Joo and Choi-Yeol visit Eun-Suh's island home and learn that she made a name for herself by predicting a tidal wave. Eun-Suh's mother Jung-Sook was also a noted psychic, but threw herself off a cliff following a failed demonstration of her powers. They also hear an account of a time when Eun-Suh, working as a club singer, was spied on in the shower by another worker, who was later found dead. As a storm hits the island, Sun-Joo and Choi-Yeol find Eun-Suh's house, which features an intense painting of her by her cousin Oh Kyung-Pil.

The pair visit Kyung-Pil, and recognise him immediately from the videotape. Kyung-Pil admits that he was once admitted to a sanatorium, and Eun-Suh came to look after him. One day, he raped her by an old well, discovering in the process that Eun-Suh was intersex. Gripped by panic, he strangled Eun-Suh, dumping her body in the well. Learning that the sanitorium was previously on the site now occupied by the holiday resort, Sun-Joo and Choi-Yeol return there to find answers. In the crawlspace under the balcony, they discover the old well. Descending into it, they begin to empty the well using buckets, as Sun-Joo's one week deadline draws near. Sun-Joo uncovers Eun-Suh's skeleton, and her deadline passes, leading the pair to believe they have broken the curse.

As Choi-Yeol's deadline approaches, he is gripped by a realisation. His television turns on by itself, showing the well at the end of the tape. The spectre of Eun-Suh emerges from the well and crawls out of the TV itself, killing Choi-Yeol. Sun-Joo is horrified that the curse is not broken, but seeing Choi-Yeol's scattered books, comes to the realisation on how the curse is actually broken: by copying the videotape and showing it to someone else, replicating it like a virus. Sun-Joo drives to her parents' house to show them the tape in hope of saving Boram.

== Cast ==
- Shin Eun-kyung as Hong Sun-Joo
- Jung Jin-young as Choi-Yeol
- Kim Chang-wan as Reporter Kim
- Bae Doona as Park Eun-Suh
- Kwon Nam-Hee
- Lee Seung-hyeon
- Kim Ggoch-ji
- Yu Yeon-su

== Production ==
In October 1998, following South Korea's decision to gradually lift restrictions on Japanese cultural imports, Hanmac Films announced a co-production agreement with Japan's Omega Project, which had produced the 1998 Japanese version of Ring. South Korea's National Archives later identified the film as the first jointly financed South Korean–Japanese film production, reporting a budget of ₩1.25 billion.

Filming took place in December 1998 on the South Korean island of Ulleungdo. Lead actress Shin Eun-kyung recalled filming on a cliff on Ulleungdo and working throughout the Lunar New Year holiday.

== Release ==
The Ring Virus was released in South Korea on 12 June 1999. It recorded 332,354 admissions in Seoul, ranking ninth among domestically produced films released in 1999. The film was also featured in the Korean Fantastic Showcase section of the third Bucheon International Fantastic Film Festival in 1999.

== Reception ==
Film critic Darcy Paquet praised the film's visual style, atmospheric soundtrack and Shin Eun-kyung's performance. Although he considered the film less mystical than the 1998 Japanese adaptation, he commended its more detailed treatment of the story and its variations on the original.

== See also ==
- List of South Korean films of 1999
