= Son Byong-ho =

South Korean actor

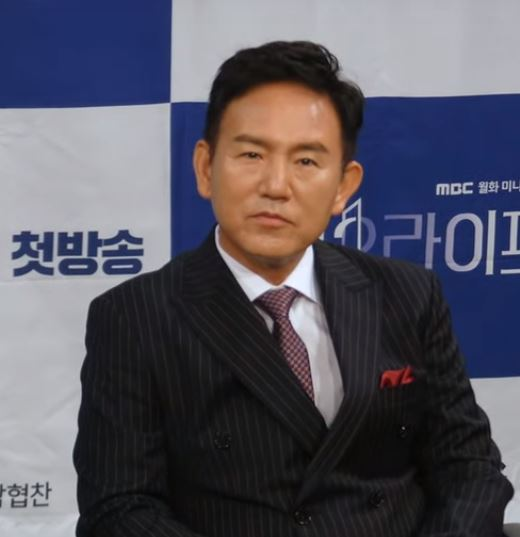
- Son in 2019
- Born: August 25, 1962 (age 63); Andong, North Gyeongsang Province, South Korea
- Occupation: Actor
- Agent: Cicada I Remember Co. Ltd

Korean name
- Hangul: 손병호
- Hanja: 孫炳昊
- RR: Son Byeongho
- MR: Son Pyŏngho

Son Byong-ho (Korean: 손병호; born August 25, 1962) is a South Korean actor. Son is known for his role in action films, notably, R-Point (2004), Running Wild (2006), The Good, the Bad, the Weird (2008) and Insu, The Queen Mother (2011).

== Filmography ==
=== Film ===
Year	Title	Role
1994	In a Handful of Time	
1994	Sado Sade Impotence	
1999	The Picnic (short film)	
1999	Phantom: The Submarine	Number 562
2001	Failan	
2001	Indian Summer	Sung Jong-hoon
2001	Ciao (short film)	
2001	Flower Island	
2002	Venus	Hong Jin-su
2002	Oasis	Han Sang-shik
2002	Ardor	Rest stop owner's husband (cameo)
2003	Tube	
2003	The End Of The Road (short film)	
2003	Reward (short film)	
2004	A Smile	
2004	Mokpo, Gangster's Paradise	Du-ko
2004	The President's Barber	KCIA-Chief Jang
2004	R-Point	Sgt. Jin Chang-rok
2004	Spider Forest	Kim Cheol-ju
2005	Long and Winding Road	Eldest son
2006	Running Wild	Yu Kang-jin
2006	Vampire Cop Ricky	Tak Moon-su
2007	May 18	Teacher Jung
2007	Going by the Book	Lee Seung-man
2008	Open City	Oh Yeon-soo
2008	The Guard Post	(cameo)
2008	The Good, the Bad, the Weird	Seo Jae-sik
2009	Insadong Scandal	Korea's top insistent person (cameo)
2009	Thirsty, Thirsty	President Pi
2009	Fly Penguin	Chairman Kwon
2009	Potato Symphony	Phoenix
2010	Republic of Korea 1% aka Miss Staff Sergeant	Sergeant Kang Cheol-in
2011	I Am a Dad	Na Sang-man
2011	Perfect Game	Kim Eung-ryong
2012	Papa	Company president Do
2012	Footsteps II (short film)	South Korean Commander Seok
2013	The Hero	Hospital receptionist (guest appearance)
2013	Red Family	Jo Myung-sik
2014	Total Messed Family	Baek Won-man
2014	The Tunnel	Mr. Kim
2014	The End of the World	
2015	Empire of Lust	King Taejo
2015	The Magician	Kim Gap-seo
2017	Fork Lane	Member of National Assembly
2020	Search Out	Convenience store boss (cameo)
2020	Night in Paradise	Chairman Doh (cameo)
TBA	Jochiwon Hae-mun	Man-guk
TBA	Beautiful Woman	

=== Television series ===
Year	Title	Role
2003	Good Person	Baek Sang-ho
2006	Great Inheritance	So Dong-pa
2006	Stranger than Paradise	Nam Il-woong
2007	Behind the White Tower	Kim Hoon
2008	Robber	Kim Ho-jin
2008	The Kingdom of the Winds	Tak-rok
2010	Giant	Hong Ki-pyo
2010	Yaksha	Kang Chi-soon
2011	49 Days	Oh Hae-won
2011	Bride of the Sun	Park Tae-ho
2011	Insu, the Queen Mother	Han Myeong-hoe
2012	Hero	Kim Hoon
2012	Bridal Mask	Jo Dong-ju
2012	The Great Seer	Choe Yeong
2012	The Birth of a Family	Lee Kyung-tae
2013	Incarnation of Money	
2013	Blooded Palace: The War of Flowers	Lee Hyeong-ik
2013	Drama Festival – "Unrest"	Yoo Kwang-hun
2014	Inspiring Generation	Choi Soo-ri
2014	KBS Drama Special – "Climb the Sky Walls"	
2014	Secret Door	Kim Sung-ik
2015	Assembly	Bae Dal-soo
2015	Mrs. Cop	Kang Tae-yoo
2015	Cheese in the Trap	Yoo Yeong-soo
2016	Jang Yeong-sil	Ha Yeon
2016	King of Mask Singer	Contestant (Episode 55) as Solomon's Choice
2017	Fight for My Way	Ko Hyung-sik
2017	Save Me	Han Yong-min
2017	While You Were Sleeping	Lawyer Ko
2017	I'm Not a Robot	Hwang Do-won
2018	Grand Prince	Lee Je
2018	Switch	Old Man Bbong
2018	Room No. 9	Kim Jong-soo
2018	Clean with Passion for Now	President Yang
2019	My Lawyer, Mr. Jo 2: Crime and Punishment	Baek Do-hyun
2019	Haechi	Chief Justice Jo Tae-goo
2019	Office Watch 3	Son Byung-ho
2019	Welcome 2 Life	Jang Do-shik
2019	The Great Show	Kang Kyung-hoo
2020	The Good Detective	Kim Gi-tae
2020	Hush	Na Sung-won
2020–2021	Royal Secret Agent	Choi Do-kwan
2021	Idol: The Coup	Director Kim (Cameo)
2022	The Mansion	Hyung-sik
2023	Our Blooming Youth	Kim An-jik
2023	Race	Jung Gu-young
2023	King the Land	Goo Il-hoon
2025	The Haunted Palace	Kim Bong-in

== Theater ==
Year	title	Role	Ref.
2022–2023	My heart dances when I see a rainbow in the wide sky	Jo Han-soo	

== Awards and nominations ==
Year	Award	Category	Nominated work	Result
2004	25th Blue Dragon Film Awards	Best Supporting Actor	R-Point	Nominated
2004	3rd Korean Film Awards	Best Supporting Actor	R-Point	Nominated
