= Nuray Deliktaş =

Turkish taekwondo practitioner

Personal information
- Nationality: Turkish
- Born: 1 January 1971 (age 55) Buca, İzmir, Turkey

Sport
- Country: Turkey
- Sport: Taekwondo
- Events: Featherweight, Flyweight
Medal record
Women's Taekwondo
World Championships
Silver medal – second place	1993 New York City	Featherweight
Bronze medal – third place	1995 Manila	Featherweight
European Championships
Gold medal – first place	1992 Valencia	Featherweight
World Cup
Bronze medal – third place	1994 George Town	Featherweight

Nuray Deliktaş (born 1971) is a retired Turkish taekwondo practitioner who competed internationally in the early 1990s, achieving notable success including a European Championship title and medals at the World Championships.

== Early life and education ==
Born in 1971 in Buca, İzmir, Turkey, Nuray Deliktaş began practicing taekwondo in 1980. She later graduated from Ege University with a degree in physical education and sports, becoming a qualified teacher.

== Taekwondo career ==
Deliktaş quickly rose to prominence in the national and international taekwondo scene. In 1991, she won a silver medal in the featherweight (–43 kg) division at the World Taekwondo Championships held in Athens, establishing herself as one of Turkey's top female athletes in the sport.

In 1992, Deliktaş captured the gold medal at the European Taekwondo Championships in Valencia, Spain, further elevating the status of Turkish women in international taekwondo competitions.

The following year, she earned a bronze medal in the flyweight (–47 kg) category at the 1993 World Taekwondo Championships in New York City.

Deliktaş also claimed medals at other prestigious events, including a bronze at the 1994 World Cup in George Town and a bronze at the 1995 World Championships in Manila, demonstrating consistent performance at the highest levels.

She retired from active competition in 1999 and has since been involved in coaching roles at Sude Sports Club and with the Turkish national team.

== Personal life ==
Nuray Deliktaş is married and has one child.
