= Terry Poindexter =

American taekwondo practitioner

Terry Poindexter Gautreaux is a former US Olympian who competed in taekwondo.

Poindexter started competing in 1987 and won gold in the Student World Championships. She competed in the 1992 Olympic Games earning a bronze medal in the 132 lbs division.

She married her instructor Oren Gautreaux. She was reported as being from both Iowa and Independence, Missouri.
