= Ayşegül Ergin =

Turkish taekwondo practitioner

Ayşegül Ergin Boyalı
Personal information
- Nationality: Turkish
- Born: Ayşegül Ergin; 1971 (age 54–55) Turkey

Sport
- Country: Turkey
- Sport: Taekwondo
Medal record
Women's Taekwondo
Representing Turkey
World Championships
Silver medal – second place	1991 Athens	Featherweight
European Championships
Silver medal – second place	1994 Zagreb	Featherweight

Ayşegül Ergin Boyalı (born Ayşegül Ergin in 1971) is a former Olympian Turkish female Taekwondo practitioner.

At the 1992 Summer Olympics in Barcelona, Spain, she competed for Turkey, and became the runner-up after losing to Tung Ya-Ling from Chinese Taipei in the final game. The Taekwondo competitions were held as demonstration sport, and therefore no medals were awarded.

She is married to World Taekwondo Championship medalist Ekrem Boyalı.

== Achievements ==
- (silver) 1991 Intern. German Championships - Idar-Oberstein, Germany -55 kg
- (silver) 1991 World Championships - Athens, Greece -55 kg
- (silver) 1992 Pre-Olympic Games - Barcelona, Spain -55 kg
- (silver) 1994 European Championships - Zagreb, Croatia -55 kg
