= Ekrem Boyalı =

Turkish taekwondo practitioner

Personal information
- Nationality: Turkish
- Born: 15 July 1970 (age 55) Konya, Turkey

Sport
- Country: Turkey
- Sport: Taekwondo
Medal record
Men's Taekwondo
Representing Turkey
World Championships
Silver medal – second place	1997 Hong Kong	Featherweight
Bronze medal – third place	1991 Athens	Bantamweight
World Cup
Silver medal – second place	1994 George Town	Featherweight
Silver medal – second place	1991 Zagreb	Bantamweight
European Championships
Silver medal – second place	1996 Helsinki	Featherweight
Silver medal – second place	1992 Valencia	Featherweight
Bronze medal – third place	1990 Aarhus	Flyweight

Ekrem Boyalı (born 15 July 1970) is an Olympian Turkish former Taekwondo practitioner and coach.

== Early years and family life ==
Ekrem Boyalı was born on 15 July 1970 in Konya, Turkey. In 1998, Boyalı went to the United States to complete his university education. Upon returning home after three years, he was appointed a lecturer at Selçuk University in Konya. In 2009, he earned a PhD degree in Exercise physiology from the Institute of Health Science at Selçuk University with a thesis on "The effect of vitamin E application on the levels of lipid peroxidation, antioxidant enzymes and lactate during acute Taekwondo exercise".

He is married with Ayşegül Ergin, also a world and European championship medalist.

== Sports career ==
He began with Taekwondo following the footsteps of his older brother Osman Boyalı in 1983. After four years of hard training at his brother's sports club, he was admitted to the national team. Later, he became captain of the Turkey team.

At the 1992 Summer Olympics in Barcelona, Spain, he competed for Turkey, and became the runner-up after losing to Kim Byong-Cheol from South Korea in the final game. The Taekwondo competitions were held as demonstration sport, and therefore no medals were awarded.

Boyalı served as coach of the Turkey national team after leaving the active sport. Later, he coached the Bulgaria national team.

== Achievements ==
- (gold) 1988 European Championships – Ankara, Turkey −54 kg (youth)
- (bronze) 1990 European Championships – Aarhus, Denmark −54 kg
- (silver) 1991 World Cup – Zagreb, Croatia −58 kg
- (bronze) 1991 World Championships – Athens, Greece −58 kg
- (silver) 1992 European Championships – Valencia, Spain −64 kg
- (silver) 1992 Pre-Olympian Games – Barcelona, Spain −64 kg
- (silver) 1994 World Cup – George Town, Cayman Islands, United Kingdom −64 kg
- (silver) 1996 European Championships – Helsinki, Finland −64 kg
- (silver) 1997 World Championships – Hong Kong, British Hong Kong −64 kg
