= Lee Ju-hyoung =

South Korean film director (born 1977)

- Born: 1977 (age 47–48); South Korea
- Occupation: Film director

Korean name
- Hangul: 이주형
- RR: I Juhyeong
- MR: I Chuhyŏng

Lee Ju-hyoung (Korean: 이주형; born 1977) is a South Korean film director.

== Career ==
Lee made his first feature Red Family in 2013. It made its debut and won the Audience Awards at the 2013 Tokyo International Film Festival.

His second feature Fork Lane (2017), won Best Director at the 21st Tallinn Black Nights Film Festival.

== Filmography ==
- Tapis Roulant (short animation, 2009)
- We've Never Seen a Night Which Has Finished by Reaching a Day (mid-length documentary, 2010)
- Red Family (2013)
- Fork Lane (2017)
- APORIA (2023)

== Awards ==
- <Red Family> Tokyo International Film Festival (2013) - Competition - Audience Award
- <Fort Lane> 21st Tallinn Black Nights Film Festival (2017) - Best Director
- <APORIA> WorldFest - Houston International Film Festival (2022) - Gold Remi
