= Park Won-sang =

South Korean actor (born 1970)

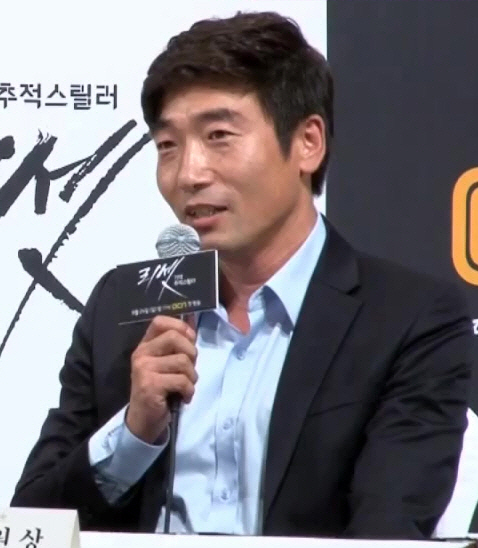
- Park in August 2014
- Born: January 20, 1970 (age 56); Seoul, South Korea
- Education: Soongsil University – German Language and Literature
- Occupation: Actor
- Years active: 1996–present
- Agent: Entourage Production

Korean name
- Hangul: 박원상
- RR: Bak Wonsang
- MR: Pak Wŏnsang

Park Won-sang (Korean: 박원상; born January 20, 1970) is a South Korean actor.

== Filmography ==
=== Film ===
Year	Title	Role	Notes/Ref.
1996	Three Friends	Violent corporal	
2000	Kilimanjaro	Gwang-han	
2000	Why Do I Want to Be a Boxing Referee?	Hyuk-shin	short film
2001	Waikiki Brothers	Jung-seok	
2001	The Last Witness	Organ trafficking man	
2002	Jungle Juice	Detective Lee	
2002	Marriage Is a Crazy Thing	Kyu-jin	
2003	The Uninvited	Park Moon-sub	
2003	Happy Ero Christmas	Henchman 1	
2003	Raindrop Prelude	Dad	short film
2004	A Smile	Min-soo	
2004	The Big Swindle	Gigolo	
2004	R-Point	Sergeant Ma Won-kyun	
2004	Spider Forest	Driver Moon	
2005	Red Eye	Jung-ho	
2005	Mom's Way	Eldest son-in-law	
2005	Innocent Steps	Ma Sang-doo	
2005	Hello, Brother	Hani's father	
2005	Tea & Poison	Young-min	short film
2006	The Art of Fighting	Section chief Ahn	
2006	Bewitching Attraction	PD Kim Young-ho	
2007	Paradise Murdered	Sang-gu	
2007	Mr. Lee vs. Mr. Lee	Detective agency contractor	
2007	May 18	Yong-dae	
2007	Rainbow Eyes	Detective Kim	
2008	Forever the Moment	Gyu-cheol, Mi-sook's husband (cameo)	
2008	Little Prince	Yong Joon-soo	
2008	The Guard Post	Beokgu general (cameo)	
2008	Girl Scout	Min Hong-gi	
2008	Nowhere to Turn	Instrument store clerk (cameo)	
2009	Short! Short! Short! 2009: Show Me the Money		segment: "Anxiety"
2009	Fly, Penguin	Seung-yoon's father	
2009	Secret	Detective Choi	
2010	A Little Pond	Refugee	
2010	My Dear Desperado	Jong-seo	
2010	Ghost (Be With Me)	Hanja teacher	segment: "Tarot 1: Ghost Boy"
2010	Rolling Home with a Bull	Man at highway rest stop (cameo)	
2010	Villain and Widow	Ham Ki-soo (cameo)	
2010	Try to Remember	Na Gyeon-jo (cameo)	
2011	Funny Neighbors	Park Jong-ho	
2011	Champ	Horse trainer Kim	
2012	Unbowed	Lawyer Park Jun	
2012	Two Moons	PD Jung (cameo)	
2012	Gaiji Keisatsu	North Korean defector source	
2012	National Security	Kim Jong-tae	
2013	Miracle in Cell No. 7	Choi Chun-ho	
2013	South Bound	Lawyer Yoon Seong-joo (cameo)	
2013	My Dear Girl, Jin-young	Hwang Tae-il	
2014	Tabloid Truth	Oh Bon-seok	
2014	The Stone	In-geol	
2014	Whistle Blower	Lee Sung-ho	
2015	The Throne	Hong Bong-han	
2017	Warriors of the Dawn	Jo-seung	
2018	Little Forest	Mailman	Special appearance
2019	The Bad Guys: Reign of Chaos	Kim Chang-sik	
2023	12.12: The Day	Go Jae-young	

=== Television ===
Year	Title	Role
2007	Drama City: "Ssamdalg Misugi"	Han Kyung-tae
2008	Chosun Police 2	Ji Dae-han
2010	Yaksha	Park Po
2011	Dream High	President Yoon
2011	Warrior Baek Dong-soo	Jang Dae-pyo
2011	KBS Drama Special: "Behind the Scenes of the Seokyeong Sports Council Reform"	Jo Pil-sang
2011	Drama Special Series: "For My Son"	Pil-gyu
2012	Hero	Kwon Hyuk-gyu
2012	KBS Drama Special: "My Wife's First Love"	Myung-chul
2013	Nine	
2013	Don't Look Back: The Legend of Orpheus	Byun Bang-jin
2013	Medical Top Team	Jo Joon-hyuk
2014	Golden Cross	Im Kyung-jae
2014	Big Man	Homicide detective (cameo)
2014	Reset	Chief investigator Han
2014	Healer	Jang Byung-se
2015	Splendid Politics	Jang Bong-soo
2015	Last	Ryu Jong-gu
2015	Bubble Gum	Jo Dong-il
2016	My Lawyer, Mr. Jo	Bae Dae-soo
2016	W	Han Cheol-ho
2016	Weightlifting Fairy Kim Bok-joo	Therapist
2017	Argon	Shin Cheol
2017	Queen for Seven Days	Park Won-jong
2018	Switch	Yang Ji-soong
2018	Familiar Wife	Byeon Sang-woo
2019	Item	Goo Dong-yeong
2020	The Game: Towards Zero	Lee Joon-hee
2020	The King: Eternal Monarch	Park Moon-sik
2021	The King's Affection	Shin Young-soo
2021–2022	Our Beloved Summer	Choi Ho
2023	Oasis	Choi Young-sik
2024	When the Phone Rings	Na Jin-cheol, Hee-joo's father
2026	The Scarecrow	adult Park Dae-ho

=== Web series ===
Year	Title	Role
2024	Chunhwa Love Story	King

== Theater ==
Year	Title	Role	Notes
2002	The Virtuous Burglar		
2002	Reunification Express		
2002	On Fate		
2002	Mister Peace		
2003	Magic Shop		
2003	Bieonso		
2004	The Happy Family		
2006	Sad Play	Jang Man-ho	
2008	A Story of Old Thieves	The Old Thief	
2009	The Seagull	Ilya Afanasyevich Shamrayev	
2010	Bieonso		
2010	Yang Deok-won Story		Theatre director
2010	Macbeth, Objection!		
2011	A Story of Old Thieves		
2012	Seoul Notes		
2012	Noises Off	Frederick Fellowes (Philip Brent)	

== Ambassadorship ==
- Ambassador for 1st Democratization Movement Memorial Park Joint Memorial Cultural Festival (2022)
