= Lee Se-eun =

South Korean actress (born 1980)

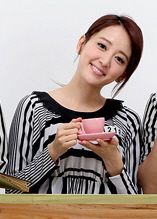
- Lee in 2012
- Born: August 31, 1980 (age 46); Seoul, South Korea
- Education: Korea University Graduate School - Master's degree in Media; Sejong University - Film Arts
- Occupation: Actress
- Years active: 1999–present
- Agent: C9 Entertainment
- Spouse: Unknown (m. 2015)
- Children: 2

Korean name
- Hangul: 이세은
- RR: I Seeun
- MR: I Seŭn

Lee Se-eun (Korean: 이세은; born August 31, 1980) is a South Korean actress. Lee made her acting debut in 1999, then began gaining popularity after starring in the horror film Bunshinsaba (2004). She appears in both television and film, notably Coma (2005), Love Needs a Miracle (2005), Fly High (2007), and The King of Legend (2010).

== Personal life ==
Lee was married in 2015 to a South Korean businessman. In November 2016, Lee gave birth to her first daughter. In 2021, Lee's second child was born December 27, 2021.

== Filmography ==
=== Television drama ===
Year	Title	Role
2000	Some Like it Hot	
2002	Love Rollercoaster	Yoon Hee-soo
2002	Rustic Period	Namiko
2002	Zoo People	Lee Se-eun
2003	Bodyguard	Han Shin-ae
2003	Jewel in the Palace	Park Yeol-yi
2005	Coma	Yoon Young
2005	Be Strong, Geum-soon!	Jang Eun-ju
2005	Love Needs a Miracle	Yoo Se-bi
2006	Yeon Gaesomun	Go So-yeon
2007	Fly High	Cha Yoo-ri
2010	The King of Legend	Wi Hong-ran
2011	KBS Drama Special: "My Wife Disappeared"	Soo-jin
2012	Salamander Guru and The Shadows	Customer (cameo, episode 7)
2012	Ji Woon-soo's Stroke of Luck	Han Soo-kyung
2014	Angel's Revenge	Lee Jin-yoo
2014	KBS Drama Special: "The Girl Who Became a Photo"	Min Yoon-hee

=== Film ===
Year	Title	Role
2000	Bloody Beach	Yeong-woo
2004	Bunshinsaba	Lee Yoo-jin
2006	Once in a Summer	Lee Su-jin
2009	The Wingo Far East (short film)	
2012	The Reflection	Helen

=== Variety show ===
Year	Title	Notes
2013	Real Experience! Embrace the World	

== Theater ==
Year	Title	Role
2010	Together with You	
2012	Heotang	

== Awards and nominations ==
Year	Award	Category	Nominated work	Result
2002	SBS Drama Awards	Best Supporting Actress	Rustic Period	Won
2007	15th Chunsa Film Art Awards	Best New Actress	Once in a Summer	Won
2007	SBS Drama Awards	Best Supporting Actress in Serial Drama	Yeon Gaesomun	Won
2010	18th Korean Culture and Entertainment Awards	Excellence Award, Actress in a Drama	The King of Legend	Won
