= Danielle Laney =

American taekwondo olympic medalist

Danielle Laney, birth name Jennifer Danielle Laney, is a former Olympic Level Competitor in Taekwondo born March 23, 1972. Danielle is from Jenks, Oklahoma She would win the Olympic trials by going undefeated, beating Arlene Limas. At the 1992 Olympics she would win a bronze in the welterweight division. Her brother Brian Laney was also a member of the National Team.

== Early life and education ==
Laney graduated from Jenks High School in 1990. She received a degree in marketing from the University of Tulsa in 1994.

== Career ==
In 1986 Laney took 2nd at the National Taekwondo Championships in the middleweight division. In 1987 Laney took 2nd at the National Taekwondo Championships in the middleweight division. In 1988 Laney took 3rd in the heavyweight division at the US Olympic Team Trials. In 1990 Laney took 2nd at the National Taekwondo Championships in the middleweight division. In 1990 and 1991 Laney won the US Collegiate National Taekwondo Championship in the middleweight division. In 1991 Laney took 3rd at the US Olympic Festival in the middleweight division.

In 1992 she competed in the women's welterweight division. Laney took 2nd at the National Taekwondo Championships in the welterweight division losing to Chavela Aaron in the finals. In 1992 Laney took 1st at the US Olympic & PanAm Team Trials in the welterweight division by going undefeated, beating Arlene Limas twice. At the 1992 Olympics she won a bronze medal in the welterweight division.

== See also ==
- USA Taekwondo
