= Mustafa Elmalı =

Turkish taekwondo practitioner

Sport
- Country: Turkey
- Sport: Taekwondo
Medal record
Men's taekwondo
World Championships
Bronze medal – third place	1987 Barcelona	–64 kg
European Championships
Silver medal – second place	1992 Valencia	–70 kg

Mustafa Elmalı is a Turkish taekwondo practitioner. He competed at the 1987 World Taekwondo Championships, winning the bronze medal in the -64 kg event. He also competed at the 1992 European Taekwondo Championships, winning the silver medal in the -70 kg.
