= Can Ergenekan =

Turkish swimmer

Personal information
- Full name: Can Erol Ergenekan
- National team: Turkey
- Born: April 28, 1972 (age 54) Istanbul, Turkey
- Height: 1.78 m (5 ft 10 in)
- Weight: 78.6 kg (173 lb)

Sport
- Sport: Swimming
- Strokes: Backstroke, butterfly
- Club: Galatasaray
- College team: University of Minnesota (U.S.)

Can Erol Ergenekan (born April 28, 1972) is an Olympic butterfly swimmer with dual-citizenship from Turkey and United States. He trained with Tualatin Hills, Galatasaray, and the University of Minnesota swim teams. During his time with the University of Minnesota swim team, Ergenekan was a three time All-American and graduated with a Bachelor of Science in biochemistry. Currently he resides in Portland, Oregon, and is competing for the Multnomah Athletic Club on their U.S. Masters Swimming team.

Ergenekan represented Turkey in the 400m freestyle, 100m and 200m butterfly events at the 1992 Summer Olympics in Barcelona, Spain and the 1996 Summer Olympics in Atlanta, Georgia, United States.

He was holder of the national record in the 200 m butterfly event with 2:00.71 set at the 1993 European Aquatics Championships held in Sheffield, United Kingdom until 2016.

After receiving his Ph.D. in biochemistry in 2003 from Washington State University and returning to the University of Minnesota as a Research Consultant and Laboratory Manager at the Minnesota Supercomputing Institute, Ergenekan returned to Portland, OR, and to his swimming roots. He won his age group for the 2-mile Open Water Nation Championship in Sweet Home, OR, with a time of 43:51.03 and set a new Oregon age group record.
