= Arlindo Gouveia =

Venezuelan taekwondo practitioner

Personal information
- Native name: Arlindo Inacio Gouveia Colina
- Nationality: Venezuela
- Born: 22 December 1969 (age 55); Punto Fijo, Venezuela

Sport
- Sport: Taekwondo

Arlindo Inacio Gouveia Colina (born 22 December 1969 in Punto Fijo, Venezuela) is a Venezuelan athlete that competed in taekwondo. He won two medals in the Pan American Games in 1987 and 1991, as well as a medal in the 1990 Pan American Taekwondo Championship. Gouveia won a gold medal in the 1992 Summer Olympics in the -54 kg category.

== International awards ==
Pan American Games
Year	Place	Medal	Category
1987	Indianapolis (United States)	Silver	–50 kg
1991	Havana (Cuba)	Gold	–54 kg
Taekwondo Championships
Year	Place	Medal	Category
1990	Bayamón (Puerto Rico)	Gold	–50 kg
Olympic Games
Year	Place	Medal	Category
1992	Barcelona (Spain)	Gold	–54 kg
