= Kong Su-chang =

South Korean filmmaker (born 1961)

- Born: 1961 (age 64–65); South Korea
- Education: Hanyang University
- Occupations: Film director, screenwriter

Korean name
- Hangul: 공수창
- RR: Gong Suchang
- MR: Kong Such'ang

Kong Su-chang (Korean: 공수창; born 1961) is a South Korean film director and screenwriter. Kong started as a screenwriter and is behind hits such as White Badge (1992), The Ring Virus (1999) and Tell Me Something (1999). He debuted with the military-themed R-Point (2004), and then The Guard Post in 2008.

== Career ==
Born in 1961, Kong Su-chang graduated from the Korean Literature Department at Hanyang University. Upon graduating, he joined 'Jang San Got Mae', an independent film union and wrote screenplays, such as O Dreamland (1989) and The Night Before the Strike (1990).

Kong is known as a talented screenwriter of thriller and war movies, such White Badge (1992), The Ring Virus (1999) and Tell Me Something (1999). His adaptation of the novel White Badge: A Novel of Korea by Ahn Jung-hyo into the screenplay for White Badge was acclaimed as the best Vietnam War film in Korea.

His directorial feature debut is the military-themed R-Point (2004), which Kong wanted as an anti-war movie. His second feature, The Guard Post (2008), also military-themed is set at the Demilitarized Zone between North and South Korea.

== Filmography ==
=== Film ===
- O Dreamland (1989) - screenwriter
- The Night Before the Strike (1990) - screenwriter
- White Badge (1992) - script editor
- No Emergency Exit (1993) - script editor
- A Casual Trip (1994) - screenwriter
- Naeireun Woldeukeop (1996) - screenwriter
- If It Snows on Christmas (1998) - screenwriter
- The Ring Virus (1999) - screenwriter
- Dulliui Baenangyeohaeng (short film, 1999) - screenwriter
- Tell Me Something (1999) - screenwriter
- R-Point (2004) - director, screenwriter, script editor
- The Guard Post (2008) - director, screenwriter, producer

=== Television series ===
- Coma (2006, OCN) - director, creative director
