= Switch (South Korean TV series) =

South Korean television series

- Promotional poster
- Hangul: 스위치 – 세상을 바꿔라
- Lit.: Switch – Change the World
- RR: Seuwichi – sesangeul bakkwora
- MR: Sŭwich'i – sesangŭl pakkwŏra
- Genre: Legal drama
- Created by: Lee Yong-seok for SBS
- Written by: Baek Woon-cheol
- Directed by: Nam Tae-jin
- Starring: Jang Keun-suk; Han Ye-ri
- Country of origin: South Korea
- Original language: Korean
- No. of episodes: 32 (Note: In order to circumvent Korean laws that prevent commercial breaks in the middle of an episode, what would previously have been aired as single 70 minute episodes are now being repackaged as two 35 minute episodes, with two episodes being shown each night with a commercial break between the two.)

Production
- Executive producers: Baek Chang-ju; Park Jin-hyung
- Producer: Jo Sung-hoon
- Camera setup: Single-camera
- Running time: 35 minutes
- Production company: C-JeS Production

Original release
- Network: SBS TV
- Release: March 28 – May 17, 2018

Switch (Korean: 스위치 – 세상을 바꿔라) is a South Korean television series starring Jang Keun-suk and Han Ye-ri. It aired on SBS TV from March 28 to May 17, 2018, every Wednesday and Thursday at 22:00 (KST) for 32 episodes.

== Synopsis ==
The series explores the gray area between legal and illegal.

== Cast ==
=== Main ===
- Jang Keun-suk as Sa Do-chan/Baek Joon-soo (dual role)
  - Choi Seung-hoon as young Sa Do-chan

- Sa Do-chan: an intelligent man who is smart enough to take the bar exam, but who in reality is a conman.
- Baek Joon-soo: a prosecutor who is the spitting image of Do-chan.

- Han Ye-ri as Oh Ha-ra

A prosecutor who is a friend of Prosecutor Baek Joon-soo since their college days. She later discovers about Sa Do-chan and ends up pairing up with him to solve a big drug case.

=== Supporting ===
==== Namsan Club ====
- Jung Woong-in as Geum Tae-woong

The head of an art gallery and a famous figure in the art industry.

- Lee Jung-gil as Choi Jung-pil

A living legend in the political domain and the former prime minister.

- Kwon Hwa-woon as Jo Sung-doo
- Song Won-seok as Manager Kim

==== People around Sa Do-chan ====
- Jo Hee-bong as Director Bong
- Shin Do-hyun as Seo Eun-ji
- Ahn Seung-hwan as Jung In-tae

A genius hacker that is part of a group of frauds.

- Son Byong-ho as Old Man Bbong/Sa Man-chun

Do-chan's father.

==== Seoul Central District Prosecutors' Office ====
- Choi Jae-won as Jung Do-young

The head of the Supreme Prosecutor's Office. He has a strong trust in his juniors, but also has a thirst for power.

- Park Won-sang as Yang Ji-soong

Chief prosecutor. He is an introverted man who is barely adjusting to his career.

- Cha Yub as Investigator Go
- Bae Min-hee as Jin Kyung-hee

Assistant prosecutor.

- Seo Young-soo as Gil Dae-ro
- Yoo In-ae as Kang Mi-ran

==== Ha-ra's family ====
- Kim Seo-ra as Ha-ra's mother
- Lee Joo-yeon as Oh Sa-ra

Ha-ra's younger sister.

=== Special appearance ===
- Son Eun-seo as Choi Min-ah (Ep. 13–14 and 26)

== Production ==
- The early working title of the series was Peacock King (공작왕; Gongjagwang).
- The first script reading took place on February 7, 2018, with the attendance of main cast and production crew.

== Original soundtrack ==
=== Part 1 ===
Released on March 28, 2018
| No. | Title | Artist | Length |
|---|---|---|---|
| 1. | "Crazy" | Teen Top | 3:14 |
| 2. | "Crazy" (Inst.) | | 3:14 |
| Total length: | | | 6:28 |

=== Part 2 ===
Released on April 11, 2018
| No. | Title | Artist | Length |
|---|---|---|---|
| 1. | "No One" | Soya | 3:40 |
| 2. | "No One" (Inst.) | | 3:40 |
| Total length: | | | 7:20 |

=== Part 3 ===
Released on April 19, 2018
| No. | Title | Artist | Length |
|---|---|---|---|
| 1. | "Blow My Mind" | Giryeon | 4:40 |
| 2. | "Blow My Mind" (Inst.) | | 4:40 |
| Total length: | | | 9:20 |

=== Part 4 ===
Released on April 25, 2018
| No. | Title | Artist | Length |
|---|---|---|---|
| 1. | "Raise Me Up" | Lee Hong-gi (F.T. Island) | 3:35 |
| 2. | "Raise Me Up" (Inst.) | | 3:35 |
| Total length: | | | 7:10 |

=== Part 5 ===
Released on May 2, 2018
| No. | Title | Artist | Length |
|---|---|---|---|
| 1. | "Stars In The Night Sky" (밤하늘 별) | Naeun, Jinsol (April) | 3:40 |
| 2. | "Stars In The Night Sky" (Inst.) | | 3:40 |
| Total length: | | | 7:20 |

=== Part 6 ===
Released on May 9, 2018
| No. | Title | Artist | Length |
|---|---|---|---|
| 1. | "Destiny" | Cha Yeoul | 3:25 |
| 2. | "Destiny" (Inst.) | | 3:25 |
| Total length: | | | 6:50 |

== Ratings ==
| Ep. | Broadcast date | Title | Average audience share | | | |
| Ep. | Broadcast date | Title | TNmS | | Nielsen Korea | |
| Ep. | Broadcast date | Title | Nationwide | Seoul | Nationwide | Seoul |
|---|---|---|---|---|---|---|
| 1 | March 28, 2018 | A Con Artist's Heart Beats Slowly (사기꾼의 심장은 천천히 뛴다) | 6.2% (NR) | 6.7% | 7.0% (12th) | 7.5% (9th) |
| 2 | March 28, 2018 | A Con Artist's Heart Beats Slowly (사기꾼의 심장은 천천히 뛴다) | 7.3% (15th) | 7.7% | 7.9% (11th) | 8.3% (6th) |
| 3 | March 29, 2018 | Secretly in Danger (은밀하게 위태하게) | 7.0% (14th) | 7.4% | 6.8% (13th) | 7.3% (11th) |
| 4 | March 29, 2018 | Secretly in Danger (은밀하게 위태하게) | 7.0% (14th) | 7.5% | 7.6% (11th) | 8.1% (8th) |
| 5 | April 4, 2018 | The Person Who Can Say I Am Who I Am (나를 나라고 말할 수 있는 자) | 5.5% (NR) | 6.1% | 5.6% (NR) | 6.2% (19th) |
| 6 | April 4, 2018 | The Person Who Can Say I Am Who I Am (나를 나라고 말할 수 있는 자) | 6.4% (20th) | 7.3% | 6.7% (15th) | 7.6% (10th) |
| 7 | April 5, 2018 | You Can't Shake Hands While Making A Fist (주먹을 쥐고는 악수할 수 없다) | 6.6% (19th) | 7.5% | 6.6% (17th) | 7.6% (12th) |
| 8 | April 5, 2018 | You Can't Shake Hands While Making A Fist (주먹을 쥐고는 악수할 수 없다) | 6.7% (17th) | 7.8% | 7.6% (15th) | 8.7% (9th) |
| 9 | April 11, 2018 | Moving Target (움직이는 과녁) | 5.8% (18th) | 6.0% | 5.8% (18th) | 6.1% (14th) |
| 10 | April 11, 2018 | Moving Target (움직이는 과녁) | 6.5% (17th) | 6.8% | 6.9% (11th) | 7.2% (10th) |
| 11 | April 12, 2018 | A Person's Attention Is Directed To That Which He Is Curious (시선은 궁금한 곳을 향한다) | 5.2% (NR) | 5.4% | 5.7% (18th) | 5.9% (15th) |
| 12 | April 12, 2018 | A Person's Attention Is Directed To That Which He Is Curious (시선은 궁금한 곳을 향한다) | 6.3% (18th) | 6.7% | 6.8% (13th) | 7.3% (11th) |
| 13 | April 18, 2018 | Ready or Not, Here I Come (꼭꼭 숨어라 머리카락 보일라) | 5.1% (NR) | 5.8% | 4.9% (NR) | 5.5% (18th) |
| 14 | April 18, 2018 | Ready or Not, Here I Come (꼭꼭 숨어라 머리카락 보일라) | 5.8% (18th) | 6.2% | 5.7% (16th) | 6.1% (16th) |
| 15 | April 19, 2018 | Betrayal Eats Up The Soul (배신은 영혼을 잠식한다) | 6.3% (16th) | 6.8% | 6.3% (16th) | 7.1% (12th) |
| 16 | April 19, 2018 | Betrayal Eats Up The Soul (배신은 영혼을 잠식한다) | 6.3% (16th) | 6.9% | 6.6% (14th) | 7.2% (11th) |
| 17 | April 25, 2018 | Jealousy Leads To Rage, and Rage Leads to Mistakes (질투는 분노를 낳고 분노는 실수를 낳는다) | 5.8% (NR) | 6.2% | 5.1% (NR) | 5.9% (16th) |
| 18 | April 25, 2018 | Jealousy Leads To Rage, and Rage Leads to Mistakes (질투는 분노를 낳고 분노는 실수를 낳는다) | 6.1% (18th) | 6.5% | 6.4% (14th) | 6.8% (12th) |
| 19 | April 26, 2018 | Secrets Blend In While the Truth Gets Revealed (비밀은 스며들고 진실은 드러난다) | 6.1% (18th) | 6.9% | 5.3% (19th) | 6.1% (16th) |
| 20 | April 26, 2018 | Secrets Blend In While the Truth Gets Revealed (비밀은 스며들고 진실은 드러난다) | 6.4% (17th) | 7.1% | 6.3% (15th) | 7.0% (11th) |
| 21 | May 2, 2018 | A Bird Flies With Two Wings (새는 두 날개로 난다) | 5.1% (NR) | 5.2% | 4.8% (NR) | 4.9% (NR) |
| 22 | May 2, 2018 | A Bird Flies With Two Wings (새는 두 날개로 난다) | 5.8% (18th) | 6.1% | 6.0% (18th) | 6.3% (18th) |
| 23 | May 3, 2018 | Don't Set a Trap in the Dark (어둠 속에서는 덫을 놓지 않는다) | 6.7% (17th) | 6.9% | 6.2% (15th) | 6.4% (15th) |
| 24 | May 3, 2018 | Don't Set a Trap in the Dark (어둠 속에서는 덫을 놓지 않는다) | 6.9% (15th) | 7.0% | 6.5% (14th) | 6.6% (13th) |
| 25 | May 9, 2018 | Fury Makes the Heart Beat Faster (분노는 심장을 빨리 뛰게 한다) | 5.5% (NR) | 5.6% | 4.7% (NR) | 4.9% (NR) |
| 26 | May 9, 2018 | Fury Makes the Heart Beat Faster (분노는 심장을 빨리 뛰게 한다) | 6.0% (18th) | 6.2% | 5.9% (17th) | 6.1% (15th) |
| 27 | May 10, 2018 | Between Apathy and Passion (냉정과 열정 사이) | 6.9% (16th) | 7.4% | 5.9% (15th) | 6.5% (12th) |
| 28 | May 10, 2018 | Between Apathy and Passion (냉정과 열정 사이) | 7.0% (14th) | 7.9% | 7.2% (11th) | 8.1% (8th) |
| 29 | May 16, 2018 | A Waterfall Makes Raging Torrents (폭포는 급류를 만든다) | 5.1% (NR) | 5.2% | 5.1% (NR) | 5.3% (NR) |
| 30 | May 16, 2018 | A Waterfall Makes Raging Torrents (폭포는 급류를 만든다) | 5.3% (NR) | 5.5% | 5.6% (19th) | 5.8% (NR) |
| 31 | May 17, 2018 | Change the World (세상을 바꿔라) | 6.7% (20th) | 7.2% | 6.7% (18th) | 7.3% (12th) |
| 32 | May 17, 2018 | Change the World (세상을 바꿔라) | 7.0% (17th) | 7.4% | 7.0% (16th) | 7.4% (11th) |
| Average | | | 6.2% | 6.7% | 6.2% | 6.7% |
In the table above, the blue numbers represent the lowest ratings and the red numbers represent the highest ratings.; NR denotes that the drama did not rank in the top 20 daily programs on that date.

== Awards and nominations ==
| Year | Award | Category | Nominee | Result | Ref. |
|---|---|---|---|---|---|
| 2018 | SBS Drama Awards | Top Excellence Award, Actress in a Wednesday-Thursday Drama | Han Ye-ri | Nominated | |
