= Red Family =

- Film poster
- Hangul: 붉은 가족
- RR: Bulgeun gajok
- MR: Pulgŭn kajok
- Directed by: Ju-hyoung Lee
- Written by: Ki-duk Kim
- Starring: Yu-mi Kim; Byung-ho Son; Woo Jun; So-young Park
- Production company: Kim Ki-Duk Film
- Distributed by: GAGA; Kim Ki-Duk Film
- Release date: 6 November 2013 (South Korea)
- Running time: 99 minutes
- Country: South Korea
- Language: Korean

Red Family (Korean: 붉은 가족) is a 2013 South Korean drama film directed by Lee Ju-hyoung.

== Plot summary ==
Undercover North Korean agents are planted in South Korean society with the mission to take out defectors.

== Cast ==
- Kim Yoo-mi as Baek Seung Hye
- Jung Woo as Kim Jae Hong
- Son Byong-ho as Jo Myung Shik
- Park So-yeong as Oh Min Ji
- Park Byung-eun as Chang-soo's father.
- Kang Eun-jin as Chang Soo's mother.
- Oh Jae-moo as Chang Soo
