= Diane Murray =

American taekwondo practitioner

Diane Murray is a former US Olympian, competing in taekwondo. Murray earned a silver medal in the 1992 Olympic Games and a bronze medal at the 1993 World Taekwondo Championships in the bantamweight division. In 1992, at the age of 39, she was inducted into the Black Belt magazine Hall of Fame.
