= Taekwondo at the 1987 Pan American Games =

Taekwondo made its debut at the 1987 Pan American Games, held in Indianapolis, Indiana, United States.

== Medal table ==
* Host nation (United States)

| Rank | Nation | Gold | Silver | Bronze | Total |
|---|---|---|---|---|---|
| 1 | United States* | 6 | 0 | 1 | 7 |
| 2 | Venezuela | 1 | 3 | 0 | 4 |
| 3 | Mexico | 1 | 1 | 1 | 3 |
| 4 | Canada | 0 | 2 | 1 | 3 |
| 5 | Argentina | 0 | 1 | 1 | 2 |
| 5 | U.S. Virgin Islands (VIR) | 0 | 1 | 1 | 2 |
| 7 | Puerto Rico | 0 | 0 | 4 | 4 |
| 8 | Dominican Republic | 0 | 0 | 2 | 2 |
| 8 | Ecuador | 0 | 0 | 2 | 2 |
| 10 | Brazil | 0 | 0 | 1 | 1 |
| 10 | Colombia | 0 | 0 | 1 | 1 |
| 10 | Paraguay | 0 | 0 | 1 | 1 |
| Totals (12 entries) | | 8 | 8 | 16 | 32 |

== Men's events ==
| Event | Gold | Silver | Bronze |
|---|---|---|---|
| 50 kg | Dae Sung Lee; United States | Arlindo Gouveia; Venezuela | Pascual Pacheco; Ecuador |
| 50 kg | Dae Sung Lee; United States | Arlindo Gouveia; Venezuela | Julio Ramos; Argentina |
| 54 kg | Carlos Rivas; Venezuela | Ricardo Jallath; Mexico | Jerry Torres; Puerto Rico |
| 54 kg | Carlos Rivas; Venezuela | Ricardo Jallath; Mexico | José Vidal; Colombia |
| 58 kg | Doug Lewis; United States | Raymond Mourad; Canada | Federico Gómez; Mexico |
| 58 kg | Doug Lewis; United States | Raymond Mourad; Canada | Armando Rivera; Puerto Rico |
| 64 kg | Chris Spence; United States | Gerardo González; Venezuela | Eulogio Jara; Paraguay |
| 64 kg | Chris Spence; United States | Gerardo González; Venezuela | Edwin Pagan; Puerto Rico |
| 70 kg | Steve Carpenter; United States | Juan Rengifo; Venezuela | Eddy Olivera; Canada |
| 70 kg | Steve Carpenter; United States | Juan Rengifo; Venezuela | Cástulo Valdés; Dominican Republic |
| 76 kg | Ernesto Rodríguez; Mexico | Alfredo Vitaller; Argentina | Antonio González; Puerto Rico |
| 76 kg | Ernesto Rodríguez; Mexico | Alfredo Vitaller; Argentina | Jay Warwick; United States |
| 83 kg | Herbert Perez; United States | Ferrère Clerveaux; Canada | Raguelli Cuevas; Virgin Islands |
| 83 kg | Herbert Perez; United States | Ferrère Clerveaux; Canada | Fernando Jaramillo; Ecuador |
| + 83 kg | Jimmy Kim; United States | Robert Fellner; Virgin Islands | Gilberto Medeiros; Brazil |
| + 83 kg | Jimmy Kim; United States | Robert Fellner; Virgin Islands | Julio Vázquez; Dominican Republic |
