= Coma (South Korean miniseries) =

- Promotional poster
- Hangul: 코마
- RR: Koma
- MR: K'oma
- Directed by: Kong Su-chang; Jo Kyoo-ok; You Joon-suk; Kim Jeong-goo
- Starring: Im Won-hee; Lee Jung-heon; Lee Se-eun; Lee Young-jin; Myung Ji-yeon
- Music by: Choi Seung-hyun
- Country of origin: South Korea
- Original language: Korean

Production
- Production company: SIO Film

Original release
- Network: OCN

Coma (Korean: 코마) is a five-part series co-produced by two South Korean firms, SIO Film and OCN. It is a horror-mystery film set in a hospital that is being shut down due to its dubious practices.

It was shown at the 7th Jeonju International Film Festival in 2006.

== Cast ==
- Lee Se-eun as Yoon Young
- Myung Ji-yeon as Nurse Kang Soo-jin
- Lee Jung-heon as Doctor Jang Seo-won
- Im Won-hee as Detective Choi
- Lee Young-jin as Hong-ah
- Cha Soo-yeon as Lee So-hee
- Jung Jae-jin as Director
- Bae So-yeon as Hye-young
- Jung Bo-hoon as Nurse Han Myung-sook
- Han Tae-il as janitor
- Lee Ye-rim as Joo-hee
- Oh Tae-kyung
- Kim Byung-chul

== Technical notes ==
Directors: Kong Su-chang (supervising director), Cho Kyu-oak, Yoo Jun-suk, and Kim Jeong-gu

Running time is just over four hours.

One DVD set has the original Korean-language sound-track and optional Korean and English subtitles. There are many dubbed versions of the film, including Cambodian. It is also sold in a version with English, Chinese, Japanese, and Korean subtitles.
