= Tung Ya-ling =

Taiwanese taekwondo practitioner

Personal information
- Nationality: Taiwanese
- Born: 18 October 1971 (age 54)

Sport
- Sport: Taekwondo
Medal record
Representing Chinese Taipei
Women's taekwondo
World Championships
Gold medal – first place	1991 Athens	Featherweight

Tung Ya-ling (Chinese: 童雅琳; pinyin: Tóng Yǎlín, born 18 October 1971) is a Taiwanese taekwondo practitioner.

She won a gold medal in featherweight at the 1991 World Taekwondo Championships in Athens, by defeating Ayşegül Ergin in the final. She also participated at the 1989 and 1993 World Taekwondo Championships.
