= R-Point =

2004 South Korean wartime action horror film

- Theatrical poster
- Hangul: 알 포인트
- RR: Al pointeu
- MR: Al p'oint'ŭ
- Directed by: Kong Su-chang
- Written by: Kong Su-chang
- Produced by: Choi Kang-hyeok; Chang Yoon-hyun
- Starring: Kam Woo-sung; Son Byong-ho; Oh Tae-kyung; Park Won-sang; Lee Sun-kyun; Ahn Nae-sang; Kim Byeong-cheol; Jung Kyung-ho; Mun Yeong-dong
- Cinematography: Seok Hyeong-jing
- Edited by: Nam Na-yeong
- Music by: Pitch Present's Dalpalan, Bang Jun-seok, Jang Young-gyu, and Lee Byung-hoon
- Distributed by: Cinema Service
- Release date: 13 August 2004
- Running time: 107 minutes
- Country: South Korea
- Language: Korean
- Box office: $6.7 million

R-Point (Korean: 알 포인트) is a 2004 South Korean supernatural horror film written and directed by Kong Su-chang. Set in Vietnam in 1972, during the Vietnam War, it stars Kam Woo-sung and Son Byong-ho as members of the South Korean Army in Vietnam. Most of the movie was shot in Cambodia. Bokor Hill Station plays a prominent part of the movie, in this case doubling as a French colonial plantation. In 2011, Palisades Tartan re-released this film on DVD under the title Ghosts of War.

== Plot ==
In January 1972, at a South Korean Army base in Nha Trang, South Vietnam, a missing platoon has sent a radio transmission from R-Point, a strategic island near Saigon. Lieutenant Choi receives orders to lead a squad, including Sergeant Jin Chang-rok, on a mission to extract the missing soldiers within a week. In return, they will receive an early honorable discharge and a clean record for Choi, who had previously shown insubordination.

Upon arrival at R-Point, the squad is ambushed by a female Viet Cong fighter and discovers a week-old corpse. The next day, a mysterious, deserted French plantation appears near their base. Corporal Joh Byung-hoon gets separated from the group and encounters other soldiers, mistaking them for his unit. When he reunites with his comrades, he shares his sighting of the missing soldiers, but they dismiss his claims.

Later, while repairing the radio, Corporal Byun Moon-Sub intercepts a transmission from a nearby French unit. A French army corporal named Jacques claims to have a twin brother named Paul, raising suspicions as their squad is the only one present. That night, American soldiers arrive and warn the Koreans about supernatural forces on the plantation's second floor, cautioning them not to touch anything. As the soldiers unwind with an impromptu dance party, they suddenly hear terrified screams recorded on their radio.

On the second day, the squad finds that Private Jung has hanged himself and report his death to headquarters, only to learn that Jung was one of the missing soldiers they were sent to rescue. Choi begins experiencing visions of the Viet Cong woman who had ambushed their platoon. Sergeant Oh encounters the ghost of his deceased friend, panics and accidentally falls into a booby trap, resulting in his death. The unit divides into two groups on the fourth day, discovering a crashed Huey helicopter with decomposed corpses, revealing that the American soldiers they previously encountered were ghosts. Mistaking Sergeant Cook for a ghost, a terrified Joh accidentally shoots and kills him.

Returning to the plantation, the squad search for American supplies on the second floor but find it deserted, confirming the presence of supernatural entities. Realizing that R-Point is haunted, they call for rescue, but the earliest helicopter can only arrive by dawn the next day. Sergeant Jin seemingly returns, warns against their presence at R-Point and beheads Sergeant Park before being shot by the soldiers. Choi orders everyone to verify their identities.

Corporal Byun, seemingly possessed, is shot by Choi but not before pulling the pin from a grenade, blinding Sergeant Jang. As the lieutenant tends to Jang, Joh, also possessed, shoots Corporal Lee. Choi kills Joh, leaving only the two of them. In Jang's pocket, they find a photo of French soldiers with the Viet Cong woman, revealing her responsibility for the deaths of the French garrison and the American soldiers.

Choi then instructs Jang to aim his rifle at him and fire, knowing he might be possessed. The next morning, the rescue team finds Jang alone, but the bodies of the other eight soldiers formerly are missing, and all bloodstains somehow vanish when the rescue team arrives. At a completely abandoned base, a radio transmission from Choi can be heard, desperately requesting reinforcements. It has been revealed that at the beginning, the last survivor of the previous platoon, also blinded like Jang, has had the same encounter with R-Point, resulting in his unit wiped out. Lt. Choi's unit was sent in despite his warnings, and now Choi's spirit on the radio is luring more people into a trap, continuing the same cycle of disappearance and paranormal.

== Cast ==
- Kam Woo-sung as Lt. Choi Tae-in
- Son Byong-ho as Sgt. Jin Chang-rok
- Park Won-sang as Sergeant Cook
- Lee Sun-kyun as Sergeant Park
- Oh Tae-kyung as Sergeant Jang Young-soo
- Son Jin-ho as Sergeant Oh
- Mun Yeong-dong as Corporal Byun Moon-sub
- Jung Kyung-ho as Corporal Lee Jae-pil
- Kim Byeong-cheol as Corporal Joh Byung-hoon
- Gi Ju-bong as Captain Park
- Ahn Nae-sang as Captain Kang

== Release ==
=== Marketing ===
Before the film was released, the film makers conducted viral marketing to promote the film. The official website, www.rpoint.com, carried several fictional articles such as a journal written by an American war correspondent, statements made by various soldiers who witnessed events portrayed in the film, radio transmissions supposedly received by Korean soldiers, Internet news links about missing Korean soldiers in Vietnam and a fictional timeline of R-Point.

== Reception ==
R-Point receives mixed reviews, with the review aggregation website Rotten Tomatoes offering a "Rotten" score of 55% from 11 critics.

=== Awards and nominations ===
2004 Blue Dragon Film Awards

- Nomination - Best Supporting Actor - Son Byong-ho
- Nomination - Best New Director - Kong Su-chang

2004 Korean Film Awards

- Nomination - Best Supporting Actor - Son Byong-ho
- Nomination - Best New Director - Kong Su-chang

2005 Grand Bell Awards

- Best Sound - Kang Joo-seok, Lead Sound
- Nomination - Best New Director - Kong Su-chang

== See also ==
- Korean horror
