= Kim Byung-chul (businessman) =

South Korean businessman and professor (born 1938)

- Kim Byung-chul(김병철)
- Born: 30 December 1938 (age 87); Sunschon, Korea
- Occupations: Professor, businessman
- Title: CEO

Academic background
- Education: BA. MBA. PDC Drexel University
- Alma mater: Political Science, Yonsei University

Kim Byung-chul (Korean: 김병철; born 30 December 1938) is a South Korean businessman and professor. He is best known for donating many relics of Gaya confederacy and Silla to the museum of Yonsei University.

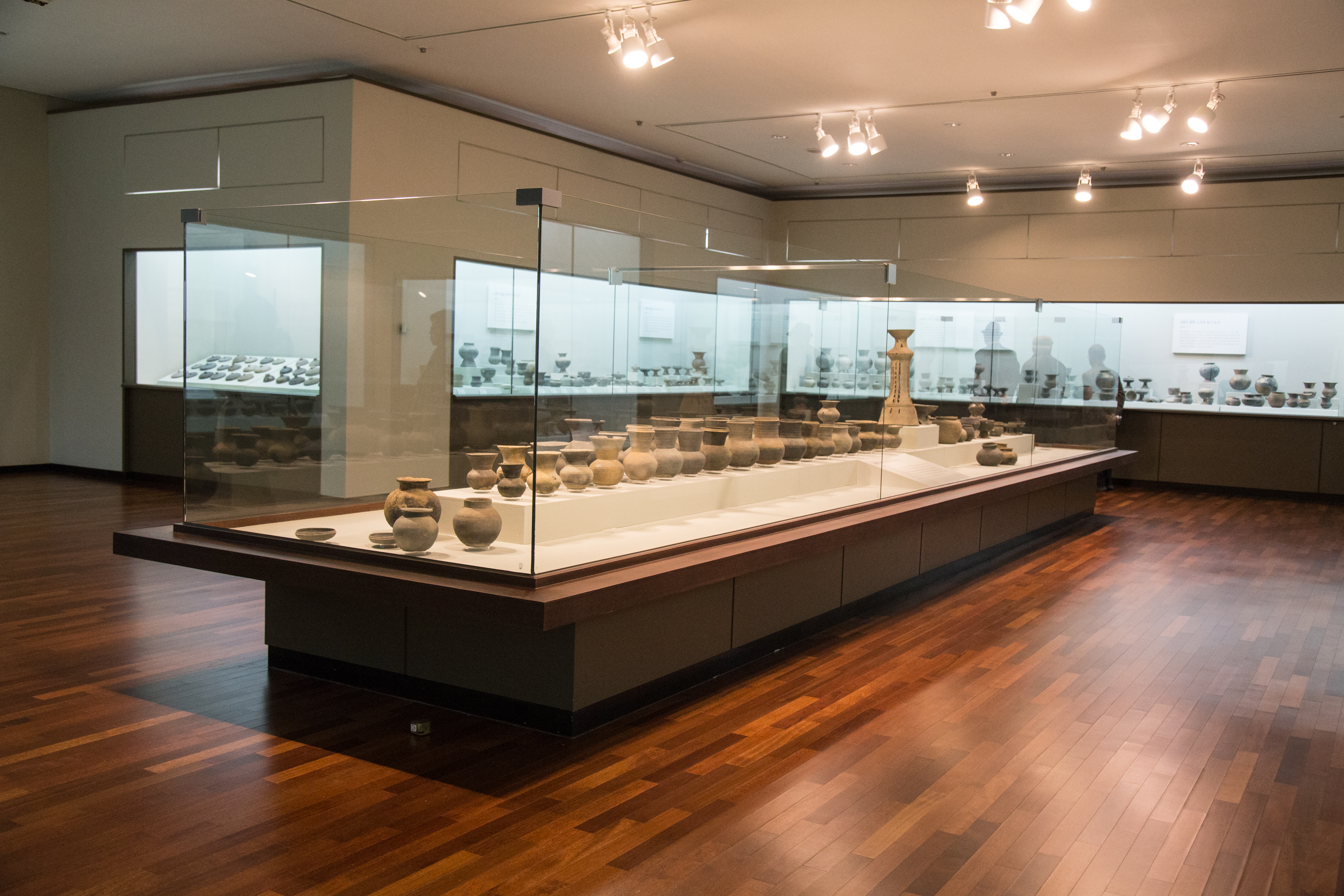
Museum of Yonsei University displaying Gaya potteries

== Biography ==
He was born in Pyongyang in North Korea which was very famous for Christianity, He graduated from the Department of Political Science at Yonsei University in 1963. After completing his MBA and PDC(Professional Doctoral Certificate) at the Drexel University, he was a professor at Seokyeong University. He served as CEO of Korea Optical Industry Co., Ltd. and CEO of Century Optics, and is the Chairman of Sunil Co. Ltd., Wooil Co.Ltd., Darim Co. Ltd., and Smarttech Co.Ltd. On 13 May 2016 he donated 1,803 Silla Pagoda and Relics to Yonsei University Museum.

== Awards ==
- 1973 Industrial Packaging Award
- 1973 Minister of Commerce Award
- Presidential Award in 1975
- 1975 Minister of Defense Award
- 1976 Prime Minister Award
- 1977 Stone Tower Order of Industrial Service Merit
- 2016 Proud Yonsei Award (Achievement Award)

== See also ==
- Yonsei University

== Books ==
- Yonsei University Museum, Pottories of Gaya and Silla by Donating Kim Byung-chul, 2016
