= Reza Mehmandoust =

Iranian taekwondo practitioner

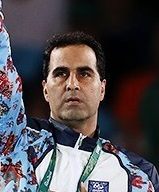
Reza Mehmandoust at the 2016 Summer Olympics as a head coach of Azerbaijan's National Taekwondo men's team

Reza Mehmandoust (Persian: رضا مهماندوست Persian pronunciation: [ɾeˈzæ mehmɒːnˈduːst]) is an Iranian Taekwondo player and was the head coach of Iran's National Taekwondo team between (1997–2014) and Azerbaijan's National Taekwondo men's team since 2014.

Mehmandoust has the title of "2011 world best Taekwondo head coach" from (W.T.F). Iran's National Taekwondo team became world champions in 2011 under his guidance.
