= Kim Byung-chul (actor) =

South Korean actor (born 1974)

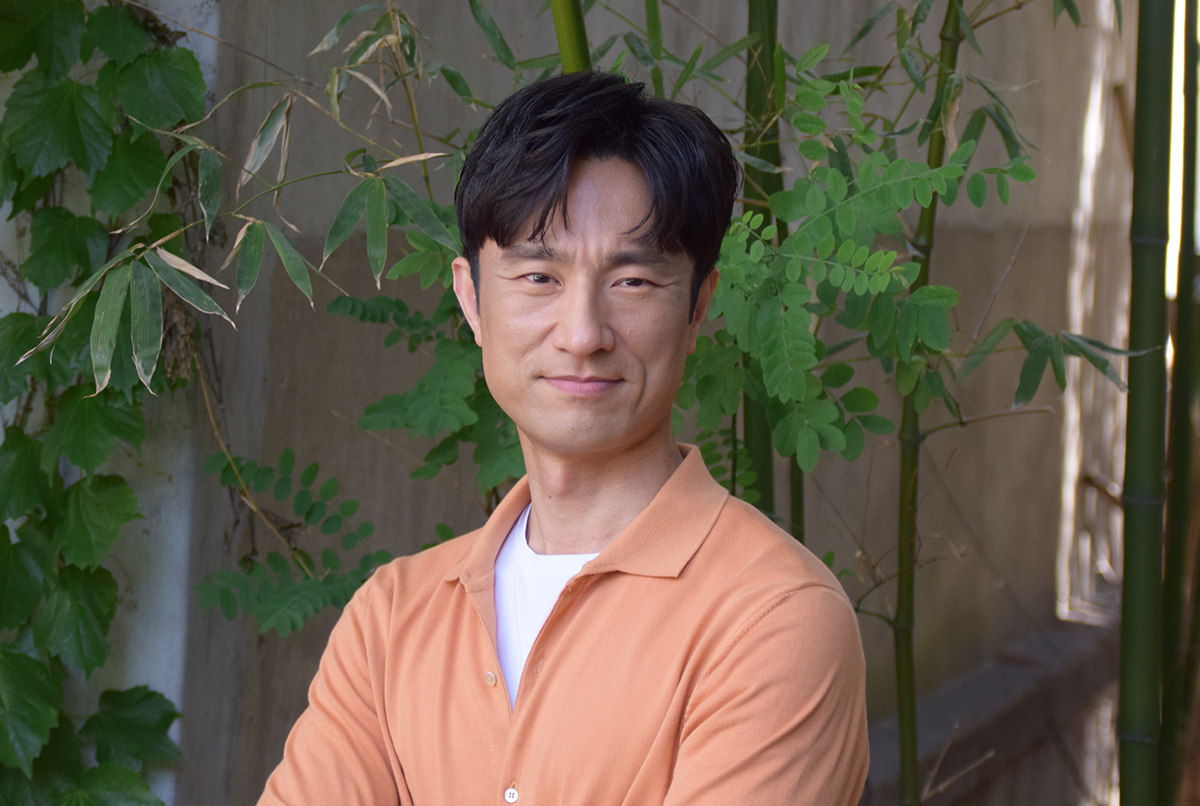
- Kim in May 2019
- Born: July 5, 1974 (age 52); Andong, South Korea
- Education: Chung-Ang University
- Occupation: Actor
- Years active: 2001–present
- Agent: Alien Company

Korean name
- Hangul: 김병철
- RR: Gim Byeongcheol
- MR: Kim Pyŏngch'ŏl

Kim Byung-chul (Korean: 김병철, born July 5, 1974) is a South Korean actor. He is best known for playing Cha Min-hyuk in the television series Sky Castle (2018–2019). He has risen to fame by acting in hit television dramas such as Descendants of the Sun (2016), Guardian: The Lonely and Great God (2016–2017), All of Us Are Dead (2022–present), and Doctor Cha (2023).

== Early life and career ==
Kim Byung-Chul was born on July 5, 1974, in Andong, a city in North Gyeongsang Province, South Korea. He discovered his love for acting when he was in the third year of high school, said in an interview. At early times of his acting career, he even taught acting as an optional subject for elementary school students. He debuted in 2001 with a theater play. He considers himself an introverted person,also said in a magazine interview.

Though he aced numerous roles in well-known dramas, he only caught worldwide attention with his skills in Descendants of the Sun, Sky Castle, and Doctor Cha.

== Filmography ==
=== Film ===
Year	Title	Role	Ref.
2003	Once Upon a Time in a Battlefield	Silla spy	
2004	R-Point	Corporal Joh Byung-hoon	
2007	Bunt	Umpire	
2007	Hwang Jin Yi	Low ranking public officer	
2007	Return	Mortuary manager	
2007	Punch Lady	Gye Sung-ha	
2008	The Guard Post	Staff Sgt. Yoon (present day)	
2009	Private Eye	Adjutant (assistant officer)	
2010	Twilight Gangsters	Travel agent	
2010	Sex Volunteer: Open Secret 1st Story	Myung-joon	
2010	Dreams Come True	Sargent Kang	
2011	Quick	Detective Park	
2012	Miss Conspirator	Dokgaegoori ("Poison Frog")	
2013	Precious Love	On-yoo's brother	
2015	Wonderful Nightmare	Jin-man	
2016	Musudan	Jak Jeon-gwan	
2018	The Discloser	Manager Hwang	
2018	Stand by Me	Poongnam Funeral Insurance	
2018	The Backstreet Noir	Bae Chang-do	

=== Television series ===
Year	Title	Role	Ref.
2006	Coma		
2010	The Scarlet Letter	Park Joong-goo	
2014	Modern Farmer	Han-chul's boss	
2015	The Missing	Kang Yoon-goo	
2015	Cheo Yong	offender (ep. 9)	
2016	Descendants of the Sun	Lieutenant Colonel Park Byung-soo	
2016	Mrs. Cop 2	Min Jong-bum	
2016	Dramaworld	Himself	
2016	Love in the Moonlight	Crown Prince's teacher (Cameo)	
2016	Shopping King Louie	Lee Kyung-kook	
2016	Guardian: The Lonely and Great God	Park Joong-won	
2017	Tunnel	Kwak Tae-hee	
2017	The Emperor: Owner of the Mask	Kim Woo-jae	
2018	Return		
2018	Live		
2018	Mr. Sunshine	Il-sik	
2018	Sky Castle	Cha Min-hyuk	
2019	Doctor Prisoner	Seon Min-sik	
2019	Pegasus Market	Jung Bok-dong	
2021	Sisyphus: The Myth	Sigma	
2022	All of Us Are Dead	Lee Byung-chan	
2023	Doctor Cha	Seo In-ho	
2024	Perfect Family	Choi Jin-hyeok	
2025	Cashero	Byeon Ho-in	

== Awards and nominations ==
Year	Award	Category	Nominated work	Result	Ref.
2017	10th Korea Drama Awards	Popular Character Award	Guardian: The Lonely and Great God	Won	
2019	55th Baeksang Arts Awards	Best Supporting Actor	Sky Castle	Won	
2019	KBS Drama Awards	Best Supporting Actor	Doctor Prisoner	Won	
