= Luca Massaccesi =

Chilean footballer (born 2006)

Personal information
- Full name: Luca Pascal Massaccesi Charme
- Date of birth: 7 April 2006 (age 20)
- Position: Midfielder

Team information
- Current team: Santiago Morning
- Number: 24

Youth career
- Santiago Morning

Senior career*
Years	Team	Apps	(Gls)
2022–	Santiago Morning	3	(0)
- * Club domestic league appearances and goals

Luca Pascal Massaccesi Charme (born 7 April 2006) is a Chilean professional footballer who plays for Primera B de Chile club Santiago Morning as a midfielder.

== Career ==
Starting his career in the youth academy of Santiago Morning, Massaccesi made his first appearance for Santiago Morning in 2023.
