= Hwang Eun-suk =

South Korean taekwondo practitioner

Personal information
- Nationality: South Korean
- Born: 14 April 1973 (age 53)

Sport
- Sport: Taekwondo
Medal record
Representing South Korea
Women's taekwondo
World Championships
Gold medal – first place	1997 Hong Kong	Bantamweight

Hwang Eun-suk (born 14 April 1973) is a South Korean taekwondo practitioner.

She won a gold medal in bantamweight at the 1997 World Taekwondo Championships in Hong Kong, by defeating Elisabet Delgado in the semifinal, and Roxane Forget in the final.
