= Abbe Kıvrık =

Turkish taekwondo practitioner

Personal information
- Born: 28 November 1972 (age 53)

Sport
- Country: Turkey
- Sport: Taekwondo
Medal record
Women's taekwondo
European Championships
Silver medal – second place	1992 Valencia	+70 kg
Bronze medal – third place	1996 Helsinki	+70 kg

Abbe Kıvrık (born 28 November 1972) is a Turkish taekwondo practitioner. She competed in the middleweight event at the 1992 Summer Olympics.
