= Kim Byong-cheol =

South Korean taekwondo practitioner

Medal record

Men's taekwondo

Representing South Korea

Olympic Games (demonstration)
Gold medal – first place	1992 Barcelona	featherweight

World Championships
Gold medal – first place	1993 New York	featherweight

Universiade
Gold medal – first place	1990 Santander	featherweight

World Games
Gold medal – first place	1989 Karlsruhe	featherweight

World Cup
Gold medal – first place	1989 Cairo	featherweight

Kim Byong-Cheol, also known as Kim Byung Chul, is a South Korean Taekwondo practitioner. He won a gold medal for South Korea at the 1992 Summer Olympics in the Taekwondo featherweight division. Taekwondo was still considered a demonstration sport at that time.

Previous to his win at the Olympics, Kim won four other international taekwondo competitions: the World Championships in 1993 in New York, the World University Games in 1990 in Santander, the World Games in 1989 in Karlsruhe, and the Taekwondo World Cup in 1989 in Cairo.

As of 2009, Kim had achieved the rank of 7th degree black belt, and he was managing World Champion Taekwondo with locations in Portland, Beaverton and Scappoose, Oregon. Kim is the head instructor at the Portland location.
