= Arzu Tan =

Turkish taekwondo practitioner

Arzu Tan Sayan
Personal information
- Nationality: Turkish
- Born: Arzu Tan; 1973 (age 52–53) Istanbul, Turkey

Sport
- Country: Turkey
- Sport: Taekwondo
- Event: Flyweight (-47 kg)
- Retired: 1996
Medal record
Women's Taekwondo
Representing Turkey
World Championships
Gold medal – first place	1991 Athens	Flyweight
European Championships
Silver medal – second place	1992 Valencia	Flyweight

Arzu Tan Sayan (born 1973) is a World champion Turkish female former Taekwondo practitioner, who competed in the flyweight (-47 kg) class, and currently acting as a coach.

Arzu Tan was born 1973 in Istanbul, Turkey. She was inspired by her older sister, World taekwondo champion Züleyhan during her trainings. She began with taekwondo at the age of nine. Particularly her uncle-in-law and trainer Fahrettin Yıldız was the major contributor to her further formation.

She was admitted to the national team in 1987. Already in 1991, she became World champion at the 1991 World Taekwondo Championships held in Athens, Greece. The next year, Tan captured the silver medal at the 1992 European Taekwondo Championships in Valencia, Spain. At the 1992 Pre Olympic Games in Barcelona, Spain, she became bronze medalist.

After participating at the 1995 World Taekwondo Championships in Manila, Philippines, where she did not reach to any medal, Arzu Tan quit active sports.

She married in 1996 to Yavuz Sayan, a young taekwondo practitioner, and gave birth to a son, Yunus Emre, in 1997. Her son, who practise taekwondo and plays handball as well, is on the way to a successful sportsman.

She runs her own taekwondo club in Kayseri, where she coaches along with her husband. Arzu Tan coached also Turkey national team.

== Achievements ==
- (gold) 1991 Inter. German Championships - Idar-Oberstein, Germany -51 kg (Youth A)
- (gold) 1991 World Championships - Athens, Greece -47 kg
- (silver) 1992 European Championships - Valencia, Spain -47 kg
- (bronze) 1992 Pre Olympic Games - Barcelona, Spain -47 kg
