= Taekwondo at the Summer Olympics =

- IOC Code: TKW
- Governing body: World Taekwondo
- Events: 8 (men: 4; women: 4)

Summer Olympics
- 1896; 1900; 1904; 1908; 1912; 1920; 1924; 1928; 1932; 1936; 1948; 1952; 1956; 1960; 1964; 1968; 1972; 1976; 1980; 1984; 1988; 1992; 1996; 2000; 2004; 2008; 2012; 2016; 2020; 2024; 2028; 2032; Note: demonstration or exhibition sport years indicated in italics
- Medalists

Taekwondo made its first appearance at the Olympics as a demonstration sport at the 1988 Summer Olympics in Seoul, South Korea. The opening ceremony featured a mass demonstration of taekwondo, with hundreds of adults and children performing moves in unison. Taekwondo was again a demonstration sport at the 1992 Summer Olympics in Barcelona, Spain. Taekwondo became a full medal sport at the 2000 Summer Olympics in Sydney, Australia, and has been a sport in the Olympic games since then.

== Summary ==
Games	Year	Events	Best Nation
24	1988	16	South Korea (1)
25	1992	16	South Korea (2)
26			
27	2000	8	South Korea (3)
28	2004	8	Chinese Taipei (1)
29	2008	8	South Korea (4)
30	2012	8	Spain (1)
31	2016	8	South Korea (5)
32	2020	8	ROC (1)
33	2024	8	South Korea (6)
34	2028	8	

== Background ==
The quest to bring taekwondo to the Olympics began in 1974 in the United States when taekwondo was admitted into the Amateur Athletic Union (AAU). One of the AAU's primary roles is to establish standards for various sports nationwide. The World Taekwondo Federation's technical standards were adopted by the AAU Taekwondo group.

In 1975, taekwondo became an affiliate of the General Association of International Sports Federations (GAISF). The GAISF promotes cooperation among various international sports federations and works closely with the Olympics movement. Five years later, in 1980, the WTF was granted recognition by the IOC. The following year, taekwondo was one of the primary events in the World Games, an international competition specifically for non-Olympic events. In 1982, taekwondo was designated an official demonstration sport for the 1988 Olympic Games in Seoul, South Korea, and for the 1992 Olympic Games in Barcelona, Spain.

In 1986 and 1987, taekwondo was included in the following international sporting events: World Cup (1986), Asian Games (1986), All-Africa Games (1986), and the Pan American Games (1987). In 1994, the IOC adopted taekwondo as an official Olympic sport for the 2000 Olympic Games in Sydney, Australia.

== Olympic competition format ==
For Olympic competition, there will be a single elimination tournament for each of the weight categories. The winner of the tournament final will receive the gold medal, and the loser will receive the silver medal while a Repechage competition will occur for the bronze medal contest.

Repechage: Single elimination in the morning session runs until the finalists have been decided. At this point, anyone who has lost to a finalist in the single elimination competition enters the repechage, the reasoning being that any one of these fighters might have been the 'third best' fighter, had they not come up against one of the top 2. "In the repechage, the losers of the semifinals during the elimination phase will be seeded directly to each of repechage finals, but on the opposite side of the bracket. Other losers will advance to the repechage unseeded, at the same side of the bracket in which they contested during the elimination phase." The athletes who lost to the two finalists in the round of 16 each face the athlete that lost to the same finalist in the quarterfinals; the winners of those contests face the athlete that lost to the same finalist in the semifinals. The two finalists of the repechage each receive a bronze medal.

Up until the 2012 Summer Olympics, a National Olympic Committee could only send a maximum of two men and two women competitors, without regard whether it is the host nation. This restriction has been lifted for the 2016 Summer Olympics, so each National Olympic Committee may now qualify one athlete per weight category.

== Events ==
Medals are awarded in four different weight classes for both men and women.

Event	Men	Women
Flyweight	−58 kg	−49 kg
Featherweight	−68 kg	−57 kg
Middleweight	−80 kg	−67 kg
Heavyweight	+80 kg	+67 kg

== Medal table ==
Updated after the 2024 Summer Olympics.

Rank	Nation	Gold	Silver	Bronze	Total
1	South Korea	14	3	8	25
2	China	7	2	4	13
3	Iran	3	3	4	10
4	United States	3	2	6	11
5	Great Britain	2	4	4	10
6	Mexico	2	2	3	7
6	Thailand	2	2	3	7
8	Serbia	2	2	1	5
9	Chinese Taipei	2	1	6	9
10	Italy	2	1	2	5
11	ROC (ROC)	2	1	1	4
12	Uzbekistan	2	1	0	3
13	Spain	1	5	1	7
14	France	1	3	6	10
14	Turkey	1	3	6	10
16	Greece	1	3	0	4
17	Cuba	1	2	4	7
18	Jordan	1	2	0	3
19	Azerbaijan	1	1	2	4
19	Tunisia	1	1	2	4
21	Australia	1	1	0	2
22	Croatia	1	0	5	6
23	Ivory Coast	1	0	3	4
24	Argentina	1	0	0	1
24	Hungary	1	0	0	1
26	Russia	0	2	2	4
27	Norway	0	2	0	2
28	Canada	0	1	2	3
29	Dominican Republic	0	1	1	2
29	Germany	0	1	1	2
31	Gabon	0	1	0	1
31	Niger	0	1	0	1
31	North Macedonia	0	1	0	1
31	Vietnam	0	1	0	1
35	Egypt	0	0	4	4
36	Brazil	0	0	3	3
37	Afghanistan	0	0	2	2
37	Venezuela	0	0	2	2
39	Belgium	0	0	1	1
39	Bulgaria	0	0	1	1
39	Colombia	0	0	1	1
39	Denmark	0	0	1	1
39	Israel	0	0	1	1
39	Japan	0	0	1	1
39	Kazakhstan	0	0	1	1
39	Nigeria	0	0	1	1
Totals (46 entries)		56	56	96	208

== Number of athletes by nation ==
Nation	96	00	04	08	12	20	24	28	32	36	48	52	56	60	64	68	72	76	80	84	88	92	96	00	04	08	12	16	20	24	Years
Afghanistan																										2	2		1		3
Algeria																											1				1
Argentina																								2	2	1	2		1	1	6
Armenia																											1				1
Aruba																												1			1
Australia																								8	4	4	2	4	4	3	7
Austria																								1	2					1	3
Azerbaijan																									2	1	2	4	2	1	6
Belarus																												1			1
Belgium																									1			3	1	1	4
Belize																										1					1
Benin																								1		1					2
Bosnia and Herzegovina																									1				1		2
Brazil																								1	3	3	2	4	3	4	7
Bulgaria																														1	1
Burkina Faso																													1	2	2
Cambodia																											1	1			2
Canada																								1	2	3	3	1	2	2	7
Cape Verde																												1			1
Central African Republic																									1		2	1			3
Chile																								1			1	1		2	4
China																								3	2	4	3	4	6	6	7
Chinese Taipei																								4	4	4	3	3	4	1	7
Colombia																								1	3	2	1	2	2		6
Costa Rica																									1	1	1		1		4
Croatia																								1	2	2	2	3	4	3	7
Cuba																								4	2	3	3	1	1	2	7
Czech Republic																														2	1
Democratic Republic of the Congo																												1	1		2
Denmark																								2	2					1	3
Dominican Republic																									1	1	1	3	3	2	6
Ecuador																										1					1
Egypt																								3	4	1	4	3	4	3	7
Ethiopia																													1		1
Fiji																														2	1
Finland																								2	1		1	1			4
France																								2	4	2	2	4	2	4	7
Gabon																										1	1	1	1	1	5
The Gambia																														1	1
Germany																								3		4	2	3	1	1	6
Great Britain																								2	4	3	4	4	5	4	7
Greece																								3	4	3	1		1		5
Grenada																											1				1
Guatemala																								1	3		1				3
Guinea																										1					1
Guinea-Bissau																														1	1
Haiti																									1			1	1		3
Honduras																										1		1	1		3
Hong Kong																														1	1
Hungary																								1					1	3	3
Individual Neutral Athletes																														1	1
Indonesia																								1	2						2
Iran																								2	2	3	3	4	3	4	7
Iraq																									1						1
Ireland																													1	1	2
Israel																									1	1		1	1	1	5
Italy																								3	3	3	2		2	3	6
Ivory Coast																								1	1	2	1	3	4	3	7
Jamaica																											1				1
Japan																								2	1	1	2	1	4		6
Jordan																								1	2	1	3	1	2	4	7
Kazakhstan																									1	2	3	3	2	2	6
Kenya																										2			1		2
Kuwait																								1							1
Kyrgyzstan																										1	1				2
Lebanon																											1			1	2
Lesotho																								2	1					1	3
Libya																								1	1	1		1			4
Malaysia																								1	1	2					3
Mali																										1	1	1	1	1	5
Marshall Islands																										1					1
Mexico																								3	3	3	4	4	2	2	7
Moldova																												1			1
Monaco																								1							1
Mongolia																												1			1
Morocco																								3	3	3	3	3	3	2	7
Nepal																									1	1		1			3
Netherlands																								2	2	1	1	1	1		6
New Zealand																									1	3	3	1	1		5
Nicaragua																								1							1
Niger																										1		1	2	2	4
Nigeria																									3	2	2		1	1	5
North Macedonia																													1	1	2
Norway																								1	1	1		1	1	1	6
Palestine																														1	1
Panama																											1	1			2
Papua New Guinea																										1	1	1		2	4
Peru																										1	1	1			3
Philippines																								4	3	2		1	1		5
Poland																									1		1	2	2		4
Portugal																										1		1	1		3
Puerto Rico																									1	2		1	1		4
Refugee Olympic Team																													3	5	1
Republic of China																													4		1
Qatar																										1					1
Russia																								2	2		4	3			4
Samoa																											2				1
Saudi Arabia																								1						1	2
Senegal																										1	1	1		1	4
Serbia																											3	2	2	3	4
Slovenia																								1			3		1	1	4
South Africa																								1	1						2
South Korea																								4	4	4	4	5	6	4	7
Spain																								4	4	4	3	3	4	4	7
Swaziland																								1							1
Sweden																								2		2	2	2			4
Switzerland																										1					1
Tajikistan																											2			1	2
Thailand																									4	3	3	3	2	3	6
Timor-Leste																														1	1
Tonga																												1	2		2
Trinidad and Tobago																								1	1						2
Tunisia																									3	1	1	3	1	4	6
Turkey																								2	1	4	3	2	5	5	7
Ukraine																									1		2				2
United Arab Emirates																										1					1
United States																								4	2	4	4	4	2	4	7
Uruguay																														1	1
Uzbekistan																									2	3	3	3	4	5	6
Venezuela																								1	4	4		1		1	5
Vietnam																								2	2	3	2		1		5
Yemen																									1		1				2
Nations	–	–	–	–	–	–	–	–	–	–	–	–	–	–	–	–	–	–	–	–	–	–	–	51	60	64	63	63	62	60	
Athletes	–	–	–	–	–	–	–	–	–	–	–	–	–	–	–	–	–	–	–	–	–	–	–	103	124	128	128	128	131	134	
Year	96	00	04	08	12	20	24	28	32	36	48	52	56	60	64	68	72	76	80	84	88	92	96	00	04	08	12	16	20	24	

== See also ==
- List of Olympic venues in taekwondo
