= Shinee videography =

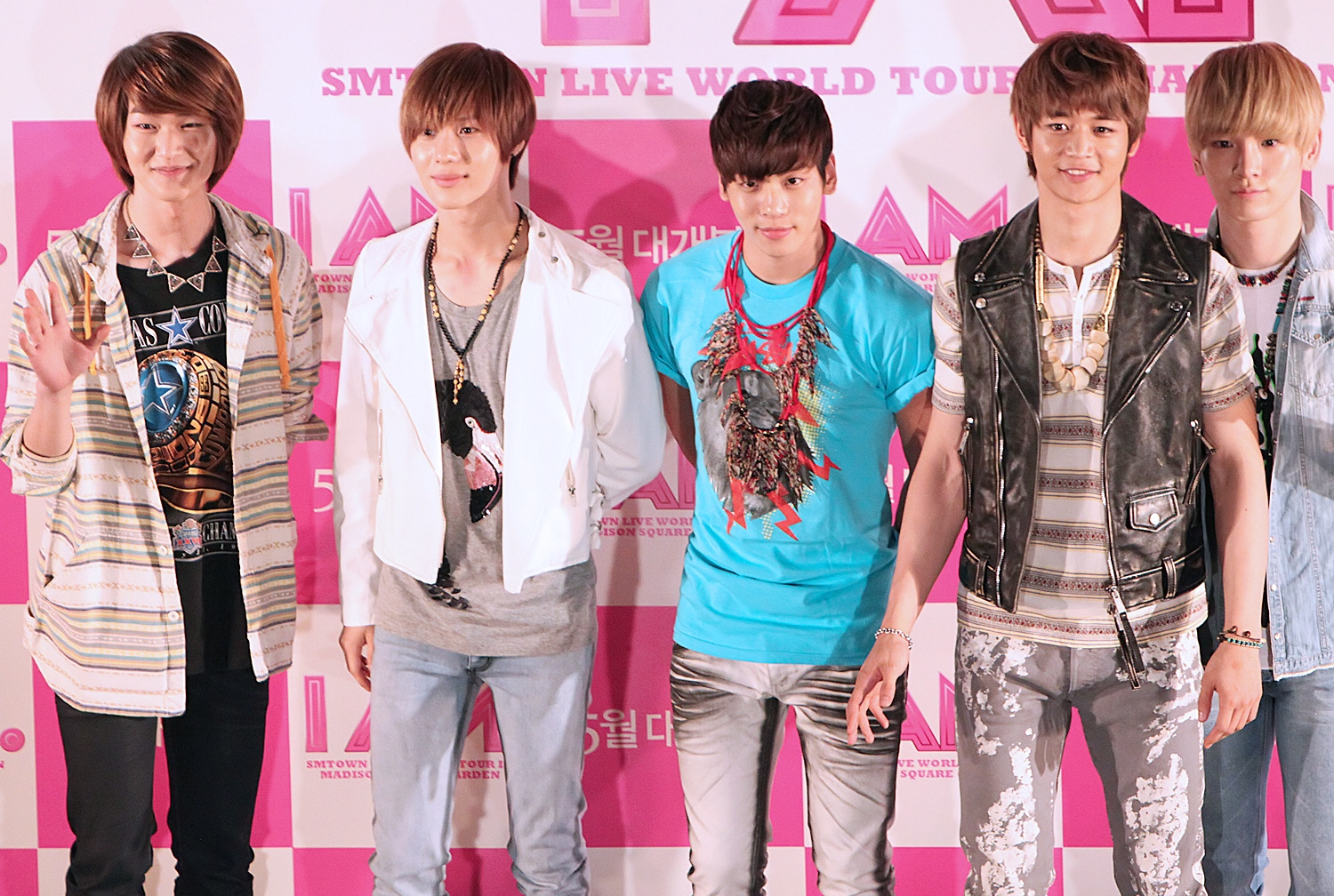
Shinee at the showcase for the documentary film I Am in 2012

South Korean boy band Shinee have released 56 music videos and 14 video albums, and have additionally appeared in a number of films and television shows. They debuted in 2008 with the release of their first single, "Replay", and its accompanying music video. Since then, they have released music videos for numerous songs, including "Ring Ding Dong" (2009), "Lucifer" (2010), "Sherlock (Clue + Note)" (2012), "Everybody" (2013) and "View" (2015). In 2012, they released a video album showcasing their first concert in Japan, Shinee the 1st Concert in Japan "Shinee World", which ranked number two on the weekly Oricon DVD Chart. They have continued to release video albums for many of their subsequent concert tours. Shinee have appeared in the documentary films I Am (2012) and SM Town: The Stage (2015), and released the concert film My Shinee World in 2023. They have also starred in a number of reality shows, beginning with Shinee's Yunhanam in 2008.

== Music videos ==
=== Korean music videos ===
List of Korean music videos, showing year released and directors
Title	Year	Director	Ref.
"Replay"	2008	Unknown	
"Love Like Oxygen"	2008	Lee Sang-gyu	
"Amigo"	2008	Cheon Hyuk-jin	
"Juliette"	2009	Lee Sang-kyu	
"Ring Ding Dong"	2009	Cho Soo-hyun	
"Lucifer"	2010	Cho Soo-hyun	
"Hello"	2010	Hong Won-ki	
"Sherlock (Clue + Note)"	2012	Cho Soo-hyun	
"Dream Girl"	2013	Seong Wonmo (Digipedi)	
"Why So Serious?"	2013	Cho Soo-hyun	
"Everybody"	2013	Jang Jae-hyuk	
"Colorful"	2013	Unknown	
"View"	2015	Shin Hee-won	
"Married to the Music"	2015	Shin Hee-won	
"1 of 1"	2016	Chung Jin-soo	
"Tell Me What to Do"	2016	Kim Woo-je (ETUI Collective)	
"Good Evening"	2018	Shin Hee-won	
"I Want You"	2018	Shin Hee-won	
"Our Page"	2018	Dee Shin	
"Countless"	2018	Korlio (August Frogs)	
"Don't Call Me"	2021	Song Min-kyu	
"Atlantis"	2021	725 (SL8 Visual Lab)	
"The Feeling"	2023	Lee Rae-gyeong (BTS Film)	
"Hard"	2023	VM Project Architecture	
"Juice"	2023	Samson (Highqualityfish)	
"Poet | Artist"	2025	Park Sye-young (KEEPUSWEIRD)	

=== Japanese music videos ===
List of Japanese music videos, showing year released and directors
Title	Year	Director	Ref.
"Replay (Kimi wa Boku no Everything)"	2011	Lee Sang-kyu	
"Juliette"	2011	Cho Soo-hyun	
"Lucifer"	2011	Hong Won-ki	
"Sherlock"	2012	Cho Soo-hyun	
"Dazzling Girl"	2012	Hideaki Sunaga	
"1000nen, Zutto Soba ni Ite..."	2012	Okita Masaki	
"Fire"	2013	Sueyoshi Nobb	
"Breaking News"	2013	Hideaki Sunaga	
"Boys Meet U"	2013	Takashi Inoue	
"Everybody"	2013	Jang Jae-hyeok	
"3 2 1"	2013	Shoichi "David" Haruyama	
"Lucky Star"	2014	Tsuyoshi Inoue	
"Downtown Baby"	2014	Jang Jae-hyuk	
"Your Number"	2015	Hong Won-ki	
"Sing Your Song"	2015	Takehisa Masaki	
"D×D×D"	2015	Hideaki Sunaga	
"Kimi no Seide"	2016	Choku	
"Winter Wonderland"	2016	Hideaki Sunaga	
"Get the Treasure"	2017	Daisuke "Nino" Ninomiya	
"Sunny Side"	2018	Peanuttart	
"Superstar"	2021	Sushivisual	

=== Lyric videos ===
List of lyric videos, showing year released and notes
Song	Year	Notes
"Symptoms"	2013	First official lyric video release for Shinee's b-side single from the fifth EP, Everybody
"Every Time"	2018	Official lyric for the promotional song from Shinee's first Japanese compilation, Shinee The Best From Now On
"Our Page"	2018	Official lyric video for the title track of The Story of Light EP.3, released on SM's real-time, multi-live broadcasting platform !t Live.
"Tonight"	2018	Official lyric video from The Story of Light EP.3, also released on !t Live.

=== Other music videos ===
List of other music videos, showing year released and notes
Name	Year	Notes
"Bodyguard"	2009	Promotional video for Samsung Anycall and drama Boys Over Flowers.
"Countdown"	2009	Promotional video for drama Dream.
"Fly High"	2010	Promotional video for drama Prosecutor Princess.
"Haru"	2010	Promotional video for web-drama Haru.
"Obsession"	2010	Promotional video for film The Warrior's Way.
"Green Rain"	2013	Promotional video for drama The Queen's Classroom. Shinee makes an appearance practicing choreography with cast members.

== Video albums ==
=== Korean video albums ===
List of Korean video albums
Title	Details
Shinee – The 1st Concert "Shinee World"	Released: August 8, 2012; Language: Korean; Labels: SM Entertainment; Formats: DVD
Shinee – The 2nd Concert "Shinee World II" in Seoul	Released: June 20, 2014; Language: Korean; Labels: SM Entertainment; Formats: DVD
Shinee – The 3rd Concert "Shinee World III" in Seoul	Released: April 24, 2015; Language: Korean; Labels: SM Entertainment; Formats: DVD
Shinee – The 4th Concert "Shinee World IV"	Released: June 16, 2016; Language: Korean; Labels: SM Entertainment; Formats: DVD, Blu-ray
Shinee – The 5th Concert "Shinee World V" in Seoul	Released: March 14, 2017; Language: Korean; Labels: SM Entertainment; Formats: DVD
Shinee World VI: Perfect Illumination in Seoul	Released: May 3, 2024; Language: Korean; Labels: SM Entertainment; Formats: DVD, Blu-ray

=== Japanese video albums ===
List of Japanese video albums, with selected chart positions and sales
Title	Details	Peak chart positions		Sales
Title	Details	JPN DVD	JPN BD	Sales
Shinee the 1st Concert in Japan "Shinee World"	Released: January 11, 2012; Language: Japanese; Labels: SM, EMI Japan; Formats: DVD	2	—	JPN: 46,283
Shinee the First Japan Arena Tour "Shinee World 2012"	Released: December 12, 2012; Language: Japanese; Labels: EMI Japan; Formats: DVD, Blu-ray	2	4	JPN: 50,693
Japan Arena Tour Shinee World 2013 "Boys Meet U"	Released: April 2, 2014; Language: Japanese; Labels: EMI Japan; Formats: DVD, Blu-ray	2	3	JPN: 35,025
Shinee World 2014 "I'm Your Boy" Special Edition in Tokyo Dome	Released: July 1, 2015; Language: Japanese; Labels: EMI Japan; Formats: DVD, Blu-ray	3	2	JPN: 64,872
Visual Music by Shinee: Music Video Collection	Released: June 29, 2016; Language: Japanese; Labels: EMI Japan, SM; Formats: DVD, Blu-ray	4	2	JPN: 23,571
Shinee World 2016 "DxDxD" Special Edition in Tokyo Dome	Released: September 28, 2016; Language: Japanese; Labels: EMI Japan, SM; Formats: DVD, Blu-ray	4	3	JPN: 68,699
Shinee World the Best 2018 "From Now On" in Tokyo Dome	Released: June 27, 2018; Language: Japanese; Labels: EMI Japan, SM; Formats: DVD, Blu-ray	3	1	JPN: 71,577
Shinee World J Presents: Shinee Special Fan Event in Tokyo Dome	Released: December 12, 2018; Language: Japanese; Labels: EMI Japan, SM; Formats: DVD, Blu-ray	4	2	
Shinee World J Presents: Bistro de Shinee	Released: November 24, 2021; Language: Japanese; Labels: EMI Japan, SM; Formats: DVD, Blu-ray	13	7	
Shinee World VI [Perfect Illumination] Japan Final Live in Tokyo Dome	Released: June 19, 2024; Language: Japanese; Labels: EMI Japan, SM; Formats: DVD, Blu-ray	3	1	JPN: 19,641
My Shinee World	Released: November 8, 2024; Language: Japanese; Labels: EMI Japan, SM; Formats: Blu-ray	—	8	JPN: 6,004

== Filmography ==
=== Film ===
Year	Title	Notes	Ref.
2012	I Am	Biographical film	
2015	SM Town: The Stage	Documentary film	
2023	My Shinee World	Documentary film	

=== Television ===
Year	Title	Notes	Ref.
2008	My Precious You	Cameo	
2013	You Are the Best!	Cameo	

=== Reality shows ===
Year	Title	Ref.
2008	Shinee's Yunhanam	
2010	Shinee's Hello Baby	
2012	World Date with Shinee	
2013	Shinee's One Fine Day	
2018	Shinee's Back	
2021	Shinee Inc.	
2023	Shinee's 15m	
2024	Shinee no Hako	
