= Kim Sae-ron filmography =

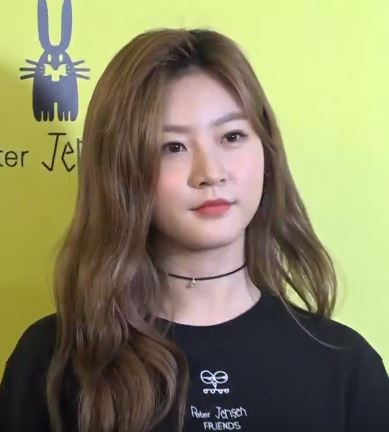
- Kim in 2018
- Film: 13
- Television series: 17
- Web series: 3
- Hosting: 1

Kim Sae-ron (Korean: 김새론) was a South Korean actress. She began her career when she was nine years old and became a popular child star through the films A Brand New Life (2009) and The Man From Nowhere (2010). As Kim reached her teenage years, she was cast in more leading roles, notably in the film A Girl at My Door (2014). She has also starred in television drama series, including Can You Hear My Heart (2011), The Queen's Classroom (2013) and Hi! School-Love On (2014). Her first adult lead role was in the television drama Secret Healer (2016).

== Film ==
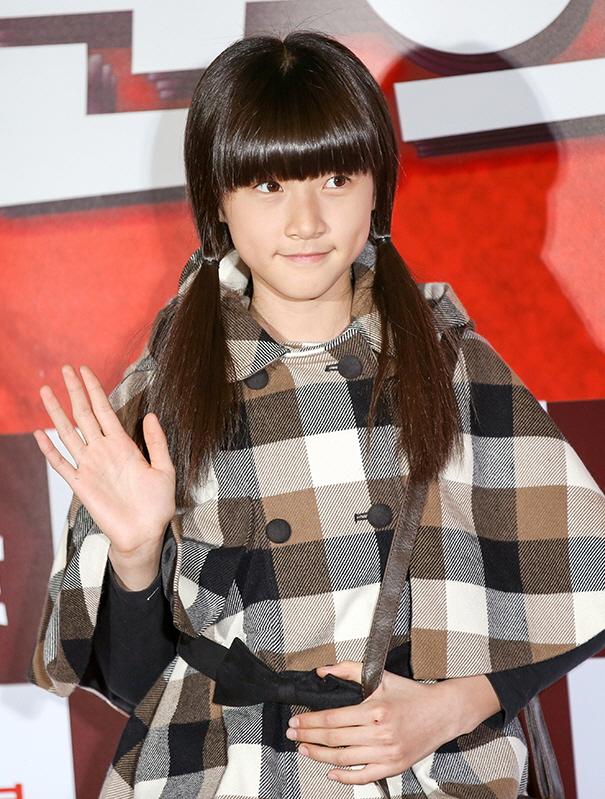
In December 2012

Year	Title	Role	Notes	Ref.
2009	A Brand New Life	Jin-hee		
2010	The Man from Nowhere	Jung So-mi		
2011	Barbie	Soon-Young		
2011	I Am a Dad	Han Min-ji		
2012	Barbie	Soon-young		
2012	The Neighbor	Yoo Soo-yeon / Won Yeo-seon		
2014	Manshin: Ten Thousand Spirits	teenage Kim Geum-hwa		
2014	A Girl at My Door	Sun Do-hee		
2014	Manhole	Soo-jung		
2016	The Great Actor	Seol Kang-sik's daughter	Cameo appearance	
2017	Snowy Road	Kang Yeong-ae		
2018	The Villagers	Kang Yoo-jin		
2025	Guitar Man	Shin Yu-jin	Posthumous release	
2026	Everyday We Are	Han Yeo-wool	Posthumous release	

== Television series ==
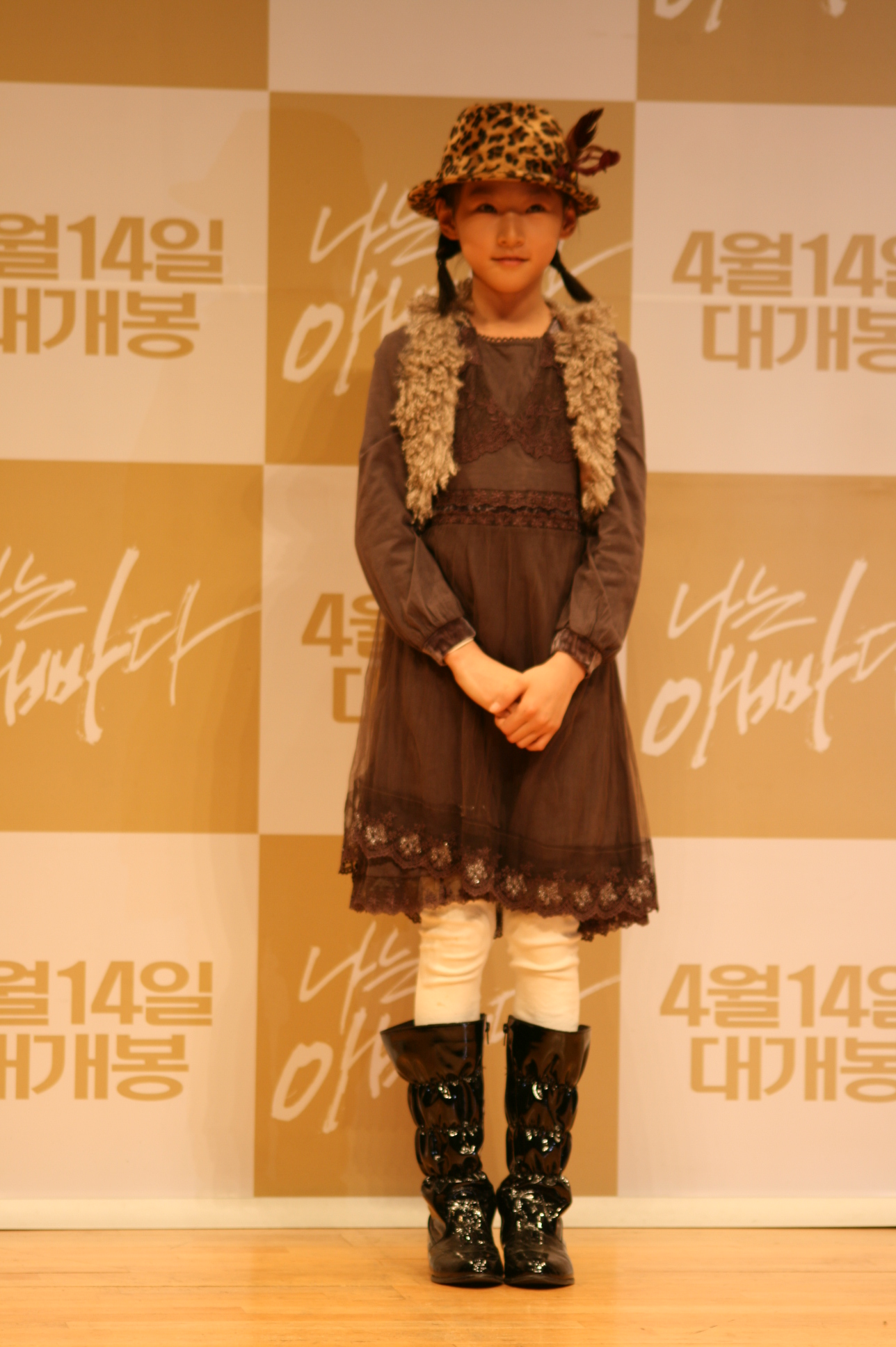
In March 2011

Year	Title	Role	Notes	Ref.
2011	Listen to My Heart	young Bong Woo-ri		
2011	Heaven's Garden	Kang Eun-soo		
2012	Fashion King	young Lee Ga-young		
2012	I Need Romance 2012	Yoon Gi-hyun	Cameo	
2012	Mom is Acting Up	Park Sae-ron		
2012	Missing You	Bo-ra	Voice cameo (episode 11)	
2013	The Queen's Classroom	Kim Seo-hyun		
2014	Hi! School: Love On	Lee Seul-bi		
2015	Snowy Road	Kang Young-ae	Drama special	
2015	Glamorous Temptation	young Shin Eun-soo		
2016	Secret Healer	Princess Seo-ri / Yeon-hee		
2019	Leverage	Go Na-byul		
2020	Nobody Knows	young Cha Young-jin		
2021	KBS Drama Special: "The Palace"	Sossang	One-act drama	

== Web series ==
Year	Title	Role	Notes	Ref.
2015	To Be Continued	Jung Ah-rin		
2018	Broject		Cameo (Part 2)	
2019	Love Playlist	Seo Ji-min	Season 4	
2021	The Great Shaman Ga Doo-shim	Ga Doo-shim		
2022	Kiss Sixth Sense	The female lead in the movie 'Haru'	Cameo (Episode 3, 5, 9)	
2023	Bloodhounds	Cha Hyun-joo	Episodes 1–7	

== Hosting ==
Year	Title	Role	Notes	Ref.
2015–2017	Show! Music Core	Main host	with Kim Min-jae, Cha Eun-woo, and Lee Soo-min	

== Music video appearances ==
Year	Song Title	Artist	Notes	Ref.
2014	"Jackpot"	Block B		
2014	"From My Heart"	5urprise		
2021	"Graduation Tears"	Yoon Jongshin	with Kim Young-dae	
2023	"Bittersweet"	EI brothers, Christine Corless		
2025	"A World without Pain"	Lee Sun-jung		
