= Shinee World III =

2014 concert tour by Shinee

- World tour by Shinee
- The official poster of the tour
- Location: Asia, North America, South America
- Associated album: The Misconceptions of Us, Everybody
- Start date: March 8, 2014
- End date: June 22, 2014
- No. of shows: 8

Shinee concert chronology
- Shinee World 2013 (2013); Shinee World III (2014); Shinee World 2014 (2014–2015)

Shinee World III (promoted as SHINee CONCERT "SHINee WORLD III") is the third concert tour by South Korean boy group, Shinee. The tour kicked off with a two-day special concert in Seoul, on March 8 and 9, 2014. It continued to six other countries—Taiwan, China, Indonesia, Mexico, Chile, Argentina—with Shinee performing in a total of seven cities.

The live album of the tour, The 3rd Concert Album "Shinee World III", was released on December 11, 2014. The album contains two CDs with a total of 33 tracks. The album was recorded in their Seoul leg at Olympic Gymnastics Arena on March 8 and 9, 2014. On April 27, 2015, they released the concert video album entitled Shinee – The 3rd Concert "Shinee World III".

== Background ==
"We named our concert 'popcorn'. Everyone has to pop. We mean that everyone has to stand up and enjoy themselves. We released a lot of albums last year and met with our fans for a while. We felt good because we felt like our spectrum was getting wider. We think that was reflected onto this concert. Even the parts where we were doubtful over, we got confidence that we could do them."

— Shinee discussing the concert in Seoul

On January 29, 2014, SM Entertainment announced Shinee's tour would begin at the Olympic Gymnastics Arena in Songpagu, Seoul, on March 8 and 9. It was their first concert in South Korea in almost two years. Tickets sold out in less than 15 minutes, and the group performed in front of approximately 20,000 fans. They performed a total of 29 songs, including some of their hits like "Juliette", "Lucifer", "Ring Ding Dong", "Sherlock (Clue + Note)", and the Korean versions of Japanese singles, such as "3 2 1" and others.

The tour then continued to Mexico, Chile, and Argentina. Shinee performed at the Mexico City Arena on April 4 for 8,000 fans, their first concert in Latin America. On April 6 and April 8, they performed in Chile and Argentina, respectively. In Chile, the concert was sold out within minutes and gathered around 8,500 fans. The group performed 25 songs. To celebrate member Jonghyun's birthday, the fans prepared signs that read, "Happy Birthday Kim Jong-hyun". The concert also gathered over 100 reporters from different press media. In Argentina, the concert gathered over 8,500 fans. Like the fans in Santiago, the fans in Buenos Aires also prepared a special event to celebrate Jonghyun's birthday. The fans prepared a cake and signs that read, "Happy Birthday Jonghyun!". Another surprise for the group was the special event during "Green Rain" when the fans held up signs that read, "Argentina loves Shinee!". Shinee thanked fans for their support.

On June 1, the group held a concert for the first time since their debut in Shanghai. Onew was unable to participate in the Jakarta concert as he was recovering from vocal cord surgery.

== Set list ==
Seoul, South Korea (March 8–9, 2014)
1. "Spoiler"
2. "Evil"
3. "Nightmare"
4. "Juliette"
5. "Lucifer"
6. "Like a Fire"
7. "Dream Girl"
8. "Hitchhiking"
9. "Girls Girls Girls"
10. "Queen of New York"
11. "Aside"
12. "Sleepless Night"
13. "Orgel"
14. "Symptoms"
15. "Kiss Yo"
16. "Start"
17. "Dazzling Girl"
18. "Real"
19. "3 2 1"
20. "Destination"
21. "Dynamite"
22. "Ring Ding Dong"
23. "Amigo"
24. "Everybody"
25. "Selene 6.23"
26. "Sherlock (Clue + Note)"
27. "Why So Serious?"
28. "Colorful"
29. "Green Rain"
Mexico, Chile, Argentina (April 4, 6, 8, 2014)
1. "Spoiler"
2. "Evil"
3. "Nightmare"
4. "Juliette"
5. "Lucifer"
6. "Replay"
7. "Dream Girl"
8. "Hello"
9. "JoJo"
10. "Love Like Oxygen"
11. "Sleepless Night"
12. "Orgel"
13. "Symptoms"
14. "Macarena"
15. "Beautiful"
16. "Real"
17. "3 2 1"
18. "Ring Ding Dong"
19. "Amigo"
20. "Everybody"
21. "Selene 6.23"
22. "Sherlock (Clue + Note)"
23. "Why So Serious?"
24. "Colorful"
25. "Green Rain"
Jakarta, Indonesia (June 22, 2014)
1. "Spoiler"
2. "Evil"
3. "Nightmare"
4. "Juliette"
5. "Lucifer"
6. "Like a Fire"
7. "Dream Girl"
8. "Hitchhiking"
9. "Queen of New York"
10. "Aside"
11. "Sleepless Night"
12. "Orgel"
13. "Beautiful"
14. "Real"
15. "3 2 1"
16. "Destination"
17. "Dynamite"
18. "Ring Ding Dong"
19. "Amigo"
20. "Everybody"
21. "Selene 6.23"

Encore

22. "Sherlock (Clue + Note)"
23. "Why So Serious?"
24. "Colorful"
25. "Green Rain"

== Schedule ==
List of concerts, showing date, city, country, venue, and attendance
Date	City	Country	Venue	Attendance
March 8, 2014	Seoul	South Korea	Olympic Gymnastics Arena	20,000
March 9, 2014	Seoul	South Korea	Olympic Gymnastics Arena	20,000
April 4, 2014	Mexico City	Mexico	Mexico City Arena	8,000
April 6, 2014	Santiago	Chile	Movistar Arena	8,500
April 8, 2014	Buenos Aires	Argentina	Luna Park Arena	8,500
May 11, 2014	Taipei	Taiwan	Xinzhuang Gymnasium	7,000
June 1, 2014	Shanghai	China	Shanghai Indoor Stadium	—
June 22, 2014	Jakarta	Indonesia	Mata Elang International Stadium	—
