= Shinee World 2014 =

2014–2015 concert tour by Shinee

- Japan tour by Shinee
- Location: Japan
- Associated album: I'm Your Boy
- Start date: September 28, 2014
- End date: March 15, 2015
- No. of shows: 32

Shinee concert chronology
- Shinee World III (2014); Shinee World 2014 (2014–2015); Shinee World IV (2015)

Shinee World 2014 (promoted as SHINEE WORLD 2014 ~I'M YOUR BOY~ IN TOKYO DOME) was the third Japan nationwide concert tour by South Korean boy band Shinee, to promote their third Japanese studio album I'm Your Boy. The tour kicked off in Chiba on September 28, 2014, and ended on December 14 in Hyogo, with a total of 30 concerts in 20 cities. On March 14 and 15, 2015, Shinee performed at the Tokyo Dome for the finale performance, which was also their first time performing at the venue. The tour was attended by a total of 300,000 fans.

== Set list ==
This set list is representative of the shows on March 14–15, 2015. It does not represent all concerts for the duration of the tour.

1. "Everybody"
2. "Lucifer"
3. "Burning Up"
4. "Sherlock"
5. "Replay"
6. "Bounce"
7. "Hitchhiking"
8. "Evil"
9. "Picasso"
10. "1000nen, Zutto Soba ni Ite..."
11. "Moon River Waltz"
12. "Colours of the Season"
13. "Fire"
14. "Amigo" / "Dynamite"
15. "Deja-Boo" (Jonghyun solo)
16. "Rainy Blue" (Onew solo)
17. "Born to Shine" (Key solo)
18. "Kera Kera Jan Ken" (Minho solo)
19. "Danger" (Taemin solo)
20. "Perfect 10"
21. "Lucky Star"
22. "Bodyguard"
23. "Boys Meet U"
24. "Your Number"
25. "Breaking News"
26. "Juliette"
27. "Ring Ding Dong" (Remix ver.)
28. "Downtown Baby"

Encore

29. "Sunny Day Hero"
30. "Dream Girl"
31. "3 2 1"
32. "Dazzling Girl"
33. "Love"

== Shows ==
List of concerts, showing date, city, venue, and attendance
Date	City	Venue	Attendance
September 28, 2014	Chiba	Ichihara City Hall	200,000
September 30, 2014	Shizuoka	Shizuoka City Hall	200,000
October 1, 2014	Gunma	Gunma City Hall	200,000
October 2, 2014	Tochigi	Utsonomiya City Cultural Hall	200,000
October 8, 2014	Oita	Lichiko Cultural Center	200,000
October 9, 2014	Nagasaki	Nagasaki Brick Hall	200,000
October 11, 2014	Nagano	Hokuto Cultural Hall	200,000
October 12, 2014	Ishikawa	Hondanomori Hall	200,000
October 13, 2014	Ishikawa	Hondanomori Hall	200,000
October 15, 2014	Mie	Mie Center for the Arts	200,000
October 17, 2014	Shizuoka	Hamamatsu Art City	200,000
October 23, 2014	Saitama	Saitama Culture Center	200,000
October 27, 2014	Okayama	Kurashiki City Auditorium	200,000
November 1, 2014	Hiroshima	Hiroshima Sports Center	200,000
November 2, 2014	Hiroshima	Hiroshima Sports Center	200,000
November 8, 2014	Niigata	Toki Messe	200,000
November 12, 2014	Aichi	Nippon Gaishi Hall	200,000
November 13, 2014	Aichi	Nippon Gaishi Hall	200,000
November 20, 2014	Fukuoka	Fukuoka Convention Center	200,000
November 23, 2014	Hokkaido	Makomanai Ice Arena	200,000
November 26, 2014	Tokyo	Yoyogi National Gymnasium	200,000
November 27, 2014	Tokyo	Yoyogi National Gymnasium	200,000
December 2, 2014	Tokyo	Yoyogi National Gymnasium	200,000
December 3, 2014	Tokyo	Yoyogi National Gymnasium	200,000
December 4, 2014	Tokyo	Yoyogi National Gymnasium	200,000
December 9, 2014	Osaka	Osaka Municipal Central Gymnasium	200,000
December 10, 2014	Osaka	Osaka Municipal Central Gymnasium	200,000
December 11, 2014	Osaka	Osaka Municipal Central Gymnasium	200,000
December 13, 2014	Hyogo	World Memorial Hall	200,000
December 14, 2014	Hyogo	World Memorial Hall	200,000
March 14, 2015	Tokyo	Tokyo Dome	100,000
March 15, 2015	Tokyo	Tokyo Dome	100,000
Total			300,000

== DVD and Blu-ray ==
Footage of Shinee's Tokyo Dome concerts was released on DVD and Blu-ray on July 1, 2015, under the title Shinee World 2014 ～I'm Your Boy～ Special Edition in Tokyo Dome. It featured all 32 songs, in addition to 45 minutes of bonus material, including live rehearsals and behind-the-scenes footage. Upon its release, the Blu-ray debuted at number one in the music category of Oricon's weekly Blu-ray chart, ranking second overall. It sold 27,000 copies in the first week, outperforming Shinee's previous Blu-ray releases. The DVD had first week sales of 8,696, placing second in the music category of Oricon's weekly DVD chart (third overall). It ranked first in Oricon's combined music DVD and Blu-ray chart.
