= Shinee World IV =

2015 concert tour by Shinee

- Asia tour by Shinee
- The official poster of the tour
- Location: Asia
- Associated album: Odd
- Start date: May 15, 2015
- End date: October 25, 2015
- No. of shows: 6

Shinee concert chronology
- Shinee World 2014 (2014–2015); Shinee World IV (2015); Shinee World V (2016–2017)

Shinee World IV (promoted as SHINee CONCERT "SHINee WORLD IV") was the fourth concert tour by South Korean boy group Shinee. The tour kicked off in Seoul on May 15, 2015, and ended in Shanghai on October 25, 2015.

== Background ==
On March 25, 2015, SM Entertainment announced that Shinee would embark on their fourth concert tour in May, starting with two concerts at the Olympic Gymnastics Arena in Seoul. Tickets went on sale on April 2. An additional performance was added to the schedule after both Seoul shows sold out. Ahead of the concert, streaming service Genie held a promotional event where fans voted for their favourite Shinee song. Shinee previewed songs from their upcoming album Odd at the show, including lead single "View". The tour continued to Taipei on August 16, where they performed new song "Married to the Music", and later to Bangkok. It was Shinee's first time holding a concert in Thailand, and the event was attended by around 200 reporters from 100 major media outlets. Shinee held another concert in Shanghai on October 25.

== Live album ==
Shinee released a live album titled Shinee World IV: The 4th Stage on April 20, 2016, featuring recordings from Shinee's concerts in Seoul. The album included two CDs containing 37 songs, 17 of which were versions arranged for the concert. It also included Korean versions of Japanese songs, such as "Your Number", "Picasso" and "Lucky Star", as bonus tracks. The album came with a 172 page photobook depicting the performance process, including rehearsals, stage performances and backstage scenes. It featured interviews with Shinee and their staff, as well as behind-the-scenes stories and a message from Shinee to their fans. The album debuted at number six on South Korea's weekly Gaon Album Chart. It sold 12,000 copies in April 2016.

== Set list ==
1. "Sherlock (Clue + Note)"
2. "Shine"
3. "Stranger"
4. "Picasso" (Korean ver.)
5. "Love Like Oxygen"
6. "Your Name"
7. "Your Number" (Korean ver.)
8. "Love Should Go On"
9. "Close the Door"
10. "Alarm Clock"
11. "Excuse Me Miss"
12. "One Minute Back"
13. "Colorful"
14. "JoJo"
15. "Love Sick"
16. "One"
17. "Better Off"
18. "An Ode to You"
19. "Wowowow"
20. "Woof Woof"
21. "Dream Girl"
22. "Runaway"
23. "Ready or Not"
24. "Beautiful"
25. "3 2 1" (Korean ver.)
26. "Nightmare"
27. "Dynamite"
28. "Everybody"
29. "View"

Encore

1. "Replay"
2. "Lucky Star"
3. "An Encore"

== Schedule ==
List of concerts, showing date, city, country, venue, and attendance
Date	City	Country	Venue	Attendance
May 15, 2015	Seoul	South Korea	Olympic Gymnastics Arena	30,000
May 16, 2015	Seoul	South Korea	Olympic Gymnastics Arena	30,000
May 17, 2015	Seoul	South Korea	Olympic Gymnastics Arena	30,000
August 16, 2015	New Taipei City	Taiwan	Xinzhuang Gymnasium	
September 27, 2015	Bangkok	Thailand	Impact Arena	
October 25, 2015	Shanghai	China	Shanghai Indoor Stadium	
