= IFFI Best Director Award =

Best director award at an Indian film festival

Silver Peacock Best Director Award
- International award for contributions to World Cinema
- Awarded for: Outstanding Film Director
- Sponsored by: Directorate of Film Festivals
- Reward: Silver Peacock Award
- First award: 2000
- Final award: 2025
- Most recent winner: Santosh Davakhar

Highlights
- Total awarded: 25
- First winner: Nonzee Nimibutr

The IFFI Award for Best Director (officially known as the Silver Peacock for the Best Director Award) is an honor presented annually at the International Film Festival of India since the 40th IFFI 2009 for the best direction in world cinema. Earlier, the award was presented as the "Silver Peacock for the Most Promising Asian Director" from the 31st IFFI (2000) to the 39th IFFI (2008).

== Recipients ==
=== IFFI Best Director Award (2009–Present) ===
List of Silver Peacock award recipients, showing the year, film(s), language(s) and Country
| Year | Recipient(s) | Work(s) | Language(s) | Country | Ref. |
|---|---|---|---|---|---|
| 2009 (40th) | Ounie Lecomte | A Brand New Life | Korean | Korea | |
| 2010 (41st) | Susanne Bier | "In a Better World" | Danish | Denmark | |
| 2011 (42nd) | Asghar Farhadi | "A Separation" | Persian | Iran | |
| 2012 (43rd) | Jeon Kyu-hwan | The Weight | Korean | Korea | |
| 2013 (44th) | Kaushik Ganguly | Apur Panchali | Bengali | India | |
| 2014 (45th) | Nadav Lapid | "The Kindergarten Teacher" | Hebrew | Israel | |
| 2015 (46th) | Peter Greenaway | "Eisenstein in Guanajuato" | Spanish | Spain | |
| 2016 (47th) | Soner Kanar and Baris Kaya | "Rauf" | Turkish | Turkey | |
| 2017 (48th) | Vivian Qu | Angels Wear White | Chinese | China | |
| 2018 (49th) | Lijo Jose Pellissery | "Ee.Ma.Yau." | Malayalam | India | |
| 2019 (50th) | Lijo Jose Pellissery | "Jallikattu" | Malayalam | India | |
| 2020 (51st) | Chen-Nien Ko | "The Silent Forest" | Taiwanese | Taiwan | |
| 2021 (52nd) | Václav Kadrnka | Saving One Who Was Dead | Czech | Czech Republic | |
| 2022 (53rd) | Nader Saeivar | "No End" | Persian | Iran | |
| 2023 (54th) | Stephan Komandarev | Blaga's Lessons | Bulgarian | Bulgaria | |
| 2024 (55th) | Bogdan Mureșanu | The New Year That Never Came | Romanian | Romania | |
| 2025 (56th) | Santosh Davakhar | Gondhal | Marathi | India | |

=== IFFI Most Promising Asian Director Award (2000–2008) ===
List of Silver Peacock award recipients, showing the year, film(s), language(s) and Country
| Year | Recipient(s) | Work(s) | Language(s) | Country | Ref. |
| 2000 (31st) | Nonzee Nimibutr | "Nang Nak" | Thai | Thailand | |
| 2002 (33rd) | Reza Mirkarimi | "zir e noor e maah" ("Under the Moonlight") | Persian | Iran | |
| 2003 (34th) | Ra'anan Alexandrowicz | "James' Journey to Jerusalem" | Hebrew | Israel | |
| 2004 (35th) | Ekachai Uekrongtham | "Beautiful Boxer" | Thai | Thailand | |
| 2005 (36th) | Vera Fogwill | "Kept and Dreamless" | Spanish | Spain | |
| 2006 (37th) | An Kung-Lee | "A Short Life" | Korean | Korea | |
| 2007 (38th) | Pongpat Wachirabunjong | "Me... Myself" | Thai | Thailand | |
| 2008 (39th) | Sergey Dvortsevoy | "Tulpan" | Kazakh | Kazakhstan | |
