= 40th International Film Festival of India =

Indian film festival in 2009

- Awarded for: Best of World cinema
- Presented by: Directorate of Film Festivals
- Presented on: December 3, 2009
- Official website: www.iffigoa.org
- Best Feature Film: "Cannot Live Without You"

The 40th International Film Festival of India was held from 23 November to 3 December 2009 in Goa. Veteran actors Waheeda Rahman and Mammootty were the chief guests for the edition. A special section commemorated 75 years of Assamese cinema by screening five films. Assamese film personalities Jahnu Barua, Gyanada Kakoti, Bidya Rao and Manju Bora were present on the occasion. For the first time, Malegaon industry of remakes received an international platform with the screening of two of their films.

Under Golden Jubilee Retro section, the sterling contributions of film personalities who have completed 50 years in the industry was acknowledged Asha Parekh, Sharmila Tagore and Soumitra Chatterjee. The competition jury was headed by Brazilian director Joao Batista de Andrade. Other members of the jury were Kenichi Okubu (Japan), Jean-Michel Frodon (France), Sarika Takhur (India) and Vic Sarin (Canada).

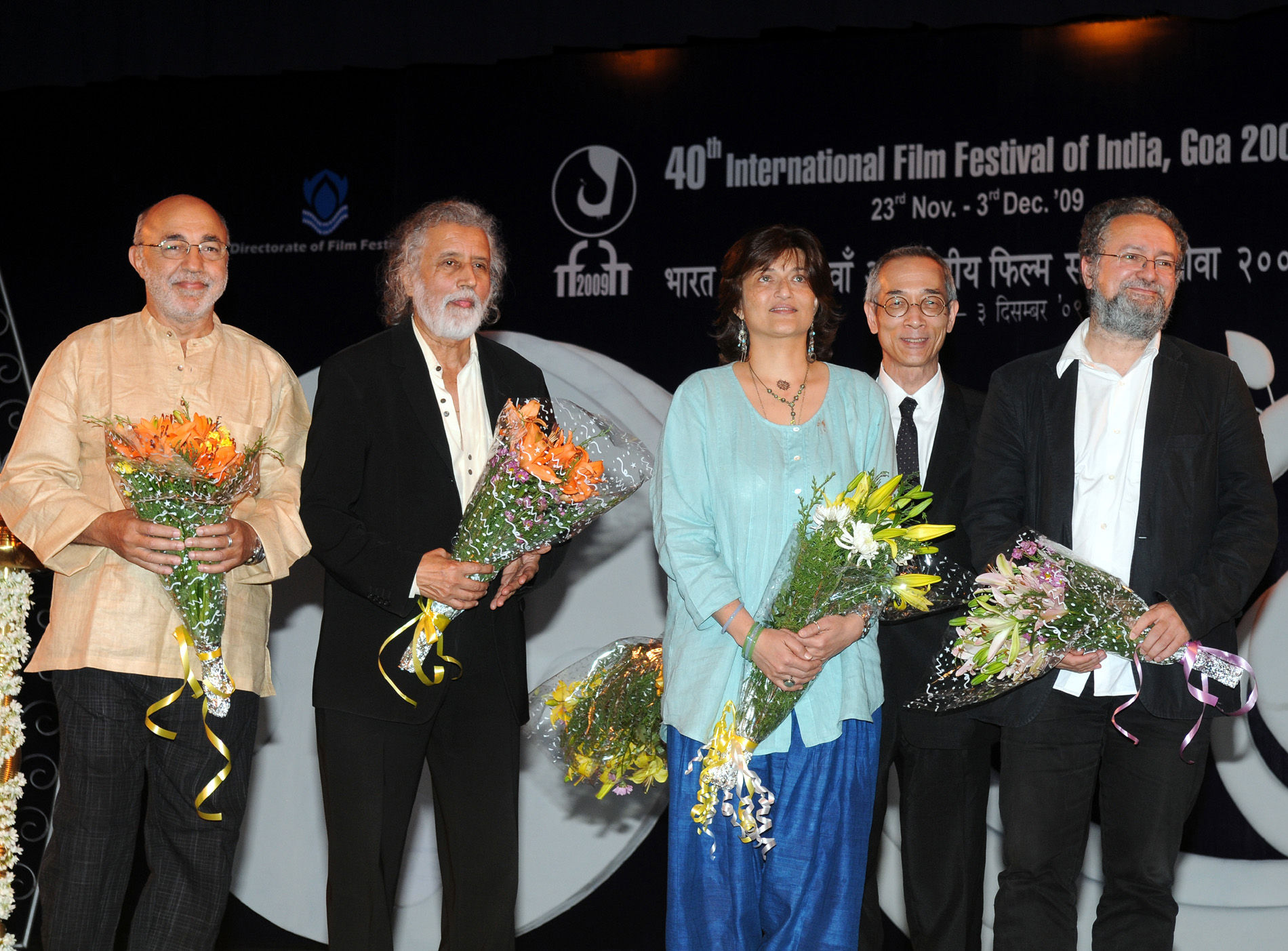
The Jury of Competition Section headed by Mr. Joao Batista de Andrade (Brazil), along with the members, Mr. Vic Sarin (Canada), Mr. Kenichi Okubu (Tokyo) Ms. Sarika (India) and Mr. Jean-Michel Frodon (France), at the inauguration of the 40th International Film Festival (IFFI-2009), at Kala Academy, in Panaji, Goa on November 23, 2009.

== Winners ==
- Golden Peacock (Best Film): "Cannot Live Without You" by "Leon Dai " (Taiwanese film)
- IFFI Best Director Award: "Ounie Lecomte" for "A Brand New Life" (South Korean film).
  - Silver Peacock Special Jury Award: "Giorgi Ovashvili" for "The Other Bank" (Georgean film)

== Official selections ==
=== Opening film ===
- "Wheat" by "He Ping" (Chinese film).

=== Closing film ===
- "Broken Embraces" by "Pedro Almodóvar" (Spanish film).
