= Paris Awakens =

1991 film

- Directed by: Olivier Assayas
- Written by: Olivier Assayas
- Produced by: Bruno Pésery
- Starring: Judith Godrèche; Jean-Pierre Léaud; Thomas Langmann; Antoine Basler; Jacques Martin Lamotte; Ounie Lecomte; Michèle Foucher; Eric Daviron; Edouard Montoute; Samba Illa Ndiaye; Eric De Roquefeuil
- Cinematography: Denis Lenoir
- Edited by: Luc Barnier
- Music by: John Cale
- Release date: 27 November 1991
- Running time: 95 minutes
- Countries: France; Italy
- Language: French

Paris Awakens (French: Paris s'éveille) is a 1991 French drama film directed by Olivier Assayas. This film has been music composed by John Cale. The film starring Judith Godrèche, Jean-Pierre Léaud, Thomas Langmann, Antoine Basler, Jacques Martin Lamotte and Ounie Lecomte in the lead roles.

== Cast ==
- Judith Godrèche
- Jean-Pierre Léaud
- Thomas Langmann
- Antoine Basler
- Jacques Martin Lamotte
- Ounie Lecomte
- Michèle Foucher
- Eric Daviron
- Edouard Montoute
- Samba Illa Ndiaye
- Eric De Roquefeuil
