= Kim Sae-ron =

South Korean actress (2000–2025)

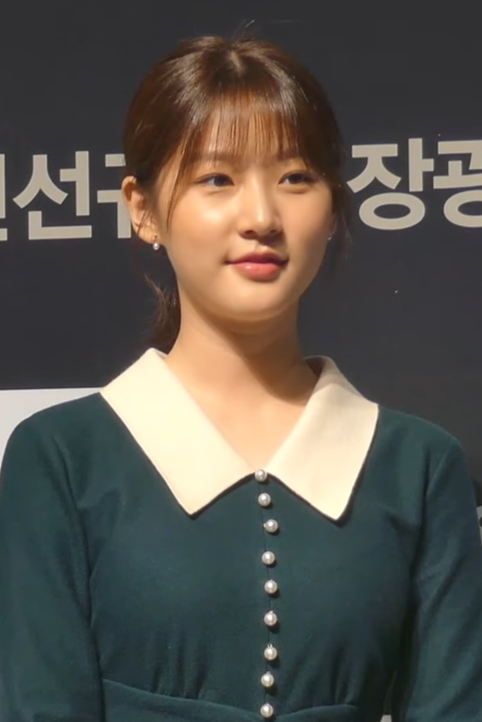
- Kim in 2018
- Born: July 31, 2000; Seoul, South Korea
- Died: February 16, 2025 (aged 24); Seoul, South Korea
- Cause of death: Suicide
- Resting place: Utopia Memorial Park, Anseong, South Korea
- Education: Chung-Ang University
- Occupation: Actress
- Years active: 2001–2022; 2024
- Relatives: Kim A-ron (sister); Kim Ye-ron (sister)

Korean name
- Hangul: 김새론
- RR: Gim Saeron
- MR: Kim Saeron

Kim Sae-ron (Korean: 김새론; July 31, 2000 – February 16, 2025) was a South Korean actress. Kim began her career in 2001 as a child model and transitioned to acting in 2009 with the film A Brand New Life (2009). She gained recognition through The Man from Nowhere (2010), earning herself a Baeksang Arts Awards for Best New Actress nomination. She later starred in the television series Listen to My Heart (2011), The Queen's Classroom (2013), and Hi! School: Love On (2014), along with the film A Girl at My Door (2014). Her first adult lead role was in the series Secret Healer (2016).

Over the years, Kim built a reputation as one of South Korea's most promising young actresses. However, in 2022, her career plateaued following a drunk driving incident, which led to public backlash and legal consequences. She left the production of Trolley (2023) and was partly edited out of the drama Bloodhounds (2023), with the storyline revised.

Kim was found dead at her home in Seoul, South Korea, on February 16, 2025, at age 24. Her death was ruled a suicide.

== Early life and education ==
Kim Sae-ron was born in Seoul on July 31, 2000. Kim had two younger sisters, Kim A-ron and Kim Ye-ron, who are also actresses. She attended Miyang Elementary School in Seoul, and graduated from Yang-il Middle School in Ilsan in February 2016. She then began attending School of Performing Arts Seoul. In 2018, Kim was admitted to Chung-Ang University's Department of Performing Arts and Film Studies.

== Career ==
=== 2001–2014: Debut as a child model and transition to acting ===
Kim began her career in 2001, making her debut as a child model for a parenting magazine.

Kim's first acting role was in the 2009 film A Brand New Life, directed by the French-South Korean filmmaker Ounie Lecomte and loosely based on her life. Kim played the main character, a nine-year-old girl named Jin-hee, who is abandoned by her father at an orphanage after he remarries, and is later adopted by a French couple. Kim attended the Cannes Film Festival when the film was shown there in a special screening, becoming the youngest actress to be invited to the festival.

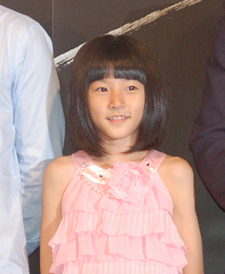
Kim in 2010

She then co-starred with Won Bin in The Man from Nowhere, which was the highest-grossing film in South Korea in 2010. She played Jung So-mi, the daughter of a heroin addict who is kidnapped by an organized crime ring. During filming, she was only allowed to watch her own scenes on the monitor. Kim won several awards for her first two roles, including Best New Actress at the Korean Film Awards and Buil Film Awards, along with a Baeksang Arts Award nomination for Best New Actress – Film.

In 2011, Kim was in another crime film, I Am a Dad, playing the daughter of Kim Seung-woo. She had her first television role in the drama series Listen to My Heart, playing the younger version of Hwang Jung-eum's character. She appeared in the first four episodes, and her performance was praised by TV critics. Her next role was in the drama film Barbie, alongside her sister Ah-ron. The film is about international adoption, and was the first Korean film to win Best Film at the Giffoni International Film Festival in 2012. Kim then had a dual role in the thriller film The Neighbor, playing a murder victim and the serial killer's next target.

In 2013, she played a student in the television drama The Queen's Classroom, which won her a Best Young Actress Award at the 2013 MBC Drama Awards (shared with three fellow cast members).

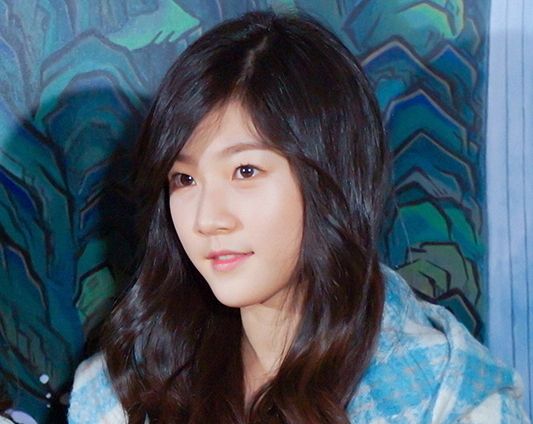
Kim in February 2014

In a 2014 interview, Kim's manager said Kim had "a great eye for good scripts which made it possible for her to choose her own projects at a very young age". Kim also stated that she never had difficulty accepting difficult roles and was able to slowly immerse herself in the characters. Her first role of the year was in the documentary-drama film Manshin: Ten Thousand Spirits, reenacting the teenage version of shamanist Kim Geum-hwa. She then played a victim of bullying and domestic violence in the film A Girl at My Door. She accepted the role because she liked the script and was attracted to the character. Kim attended the Cannes Film Festival for the second time when the film premiered there as an Un Certain Regard official selection. Her performance was praised by critics—Variety called it "mesmerizing" and Twitch Film noted she had shown more layers and depth compared to her previous roles. She was nominated for many awards, winning Best New Actress at the 35th Blue Dragon Film Awards and Golden Cinematography Awards. Also in 2014, she starred in the teen fantasy-romance television series Hi! School: Love On as an angel who becomes human, and the thriller film Manhole, playing a hearing impaired girl who is kidnapped by a serial killer.

=== 2015–2021: Acclaim and transition to lead roles ===
In 2015, Kim had a lead role in the Drama City television special, Snowy Road. The two-part drama series is about the "comfort women" in Korea under Japanese rule during World War II, and was later released as a film in theaters. Kim's performance as a 15-year-old comfort woman was praised by both critics and viewers, and she was awarded Best Actress in a Foreign Film at the Golden Rooster and Hundred Flowers Film Festival. She then played the main character in the television series To Be Continued and the younger version of Choi Kang-hee's character in Glamorous Temptation.

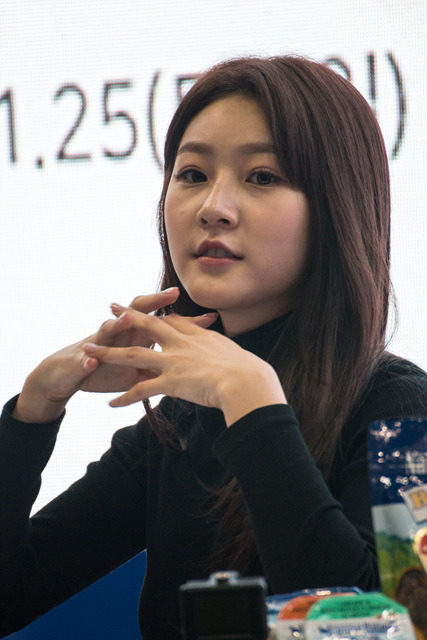
Kim in November 2017

She was cast in her first adult role in the 2016 television drama series, Secret Healer, playing a cursed Joseon-era princess. Her character has a fictional romance with Heo Jun, played by Yoon Shi-yoon, who was 14 years Kim's senior. In November 2016, Kim signed with YG Entertainment.

In 2018, Kim starred in the thriller film The Villagers. She went on to star in the fourth season of the campus web drama Love Playlist in 2019. The same year she starred in the thriller drama Leverage, based on the American drama of the same name. In November, it was reported that Kim's contract with YG Entertainment had expired, and that she would be leaving the company. In January 2020, Kim signed with Gold Medalist along with actors Kim Soo-hyun and Seo Yea-ji.

In May 2021, Kim was confirmed to take the female lead role in the 12-episode web series The Great Shaman Ga Doo-shim, with Nam Da-reum portraying the male main lead.

=== 2022–2024: DUI incident, career plateau and comeback attempt ===
In April 2022, she was cast in the SBS drama Trolley. On May 18, around 8:00 am, Kim was driving under the influence in Gangnam District, Seoul, when she crashed into several structures, including a transformer, guard rails and street trees. In the crash, the transformer malfunctioned, and electricity was interrupted for about three hours at 57 places, including nearby shops, causing damage to merchants. The following day, her agency, Gold Medalist, released a statement saying that, "Kim Sae-ron is deeply reflecting on her apparent mistake. The damage caused by the crash is being compensated as much as possible. I will do my best to take responsibility until the end." On May 19, she left the Trolley drama due to the charges.

On May 23, Netflix announced that it has decided not to shoot additional scenes with Kim in the series Bloodhounds (2023). A Netflix representative stated that "the editing of Kim's existing scene is under discussion". In 2023, the series was released after a significant portion of Kim's scenes were edited out, with the storyline revised.

In December 2022, Kim's contract with Gold Medalist expired.

On April 17, 2024, it was announced that Kim would act in the upcoming play Dong Chi Mee. This would be her first return to acting since the incident. On April 18, the organizers of the play announced that Kim was stepping down due to poor health issues.

=== 2025: Posthumous releases ===
Kim's last two films, Guitar Man and Urineun Maeil Maeil (Day by Day), are set to be released posthumously in 2025. Filming for Guitar Man wrapped-up at the end of 2024 and was released in May 2025. Urineun Maeil Maeil (Day by Day) was filmed in the latter half of 2021 and intended to be released in the first half of 2022. However, due to post-production difficulties, including Kim's drunk driving incident in May 2022, the film was shelved; it was initially planned to be released in South Korean cinemas in September 2025, though in May 2025 it was again delayed.

== Volunteer work ==
From 2015 to 2023, Kim volunteered for the Blue Angels, a group that cares for animals at shelters. Kim also frequently used her Instagram account to raise awareness for abandoned dogs and cats.

== Personal life ==
=== DUI incident aftermath ===
On May 19, 2022, Kim posted a hand-written apology to her Instagram account. She stated:

First, I am sorry to inform you of the position after arranging the accident and damage situation. Yesterday May 18, 2022 around 8 am in Gangnam, I had an accident that damaged public property. I made a big mistake while drinking.

I caused damage to so many people, including merchants, citizens, and those who restored it. I should have acted more carefully and responsibly, but I couldn't. I sincerely apologize.

We are working out the damage caused by the accident together with the company. I will do my best to communicate and actively resolve the matter until the end. I am very sorry to my fellow actors and staff as well as the production team for disrupting the production of the work that was being filmed and prepared.

Once again, I deeply apologize and apologize for causing concern. There is no excuse for this unfortunate incident. I am disappointed and very ashamed of the mistakes I have made.

She continued to receive criticism after it was reported online that she had allegedly hosted her 22nd birthday party, two months after the incident, at a bar and asked invitees to bring alcohol. On November 4, 2022, it was reported all the money that Kim had accumulated during her career had been used to cover the costs incurred due to the accident and settlement expenses, and that she had taken a part-time job. Later, Gold Medalist confirmed that Kim had a part-time job because her financial situation was difficult but later quit.

Negative public sentiment not only ended her acting career but also made it difficult for Kim to maintain her job at cafes and acting academies. According to a close associate, she changed her name and wore glasses in order to avoid recognition, but when people found out who she was, Kim would receive termination notices.

On March 8, 2023, the prosecutor of Seoul Central District Court asked for a fine of ₩20 million. Later, Kim appealed for leniency due to financial difficulties and requested a fine of ₩5 million from Mr. A, who was riding with her. Her previous agency, Gold Medalist, compensated businesses affected by the power outage resulting from her collision with the transformer, along with the actress. By the time of her death, she had a debt of more than ₩700 million won ($486,000) to her agency as a result of these settlements. She had also borrowed from friends and acquaintances to cover some of her debts.

In September 2024, Kim posted a social media message that suggested suicidal thoughts. She wrote, "If I die, please capture this and share it," and expressed frustration over the DUI incident, saying "the breathalyzer showed 0, the blood test showed a high level but that was from the day before. There was no blackout. I compensated all the damages anyway. At least now, I won’t be in pain anymore." She also thanked those who had helped her. After seeing the message, two acquaintances visited her and prevented a crisis.

=== Relationship ===
On March 24, 2024, actor Kim Soo-hyun denied dating rumors with Kim, after a close-up photo of them that she briefly posted and deleted on Instagram circulated online. His agency, Gold Medalist, stated that the rumors were false, explaining that the photo was taken when they were under the same management and that they were unaware of her intentions in sharing it. The agency also warned against defamatory content. In March 2025, Kim's mother criticized Gold Medalist's 2024 statement, which falsely portrayed her as a confused young woman who lied.

Shortly after Kim's suicide, the YouTube channel Hover Lab alleged that Kim Soo-hyun began dating her when she was underage, at only 15 years old. To support the claims, Hover Lab released materials said to be from the actress' family. His agency, Gold Medalist, denied the allegations and threatened legal action against Hover Lab. On March 14, 2025, Gold Medalist published a statement confirming that Kim Soo-hyun dated Kim, though they claimed that their romantic relationship only lasted from the summer of 2019 to the fall of 2020, when the actress was 19 to 20 years old; the actor was 31 to 32 at the time. However, Gold Medalist stated that Kim Soo-hyun and Kim's photo released by Hover Lab was taken in the winter of 2020. There were inconsistencies in the statements of Gold Medalist that keep changing. They also said that a leaked letter he had written to Kim when she was 17 was casual and platonic, asserting that "the expression 'I miss you' was a casual expression that a soldier using while serving in the military with close acquaintances".

In May 2026, the Seoul Gangnam Police Station announced that it had determined evidence alleging wrongdoing of the actor Kim Soo-hyun had been falsified using a combination of image editing and artificial intelligence (AI), including an AI-generated voice clone of the late actress Kim. The police announced that they were seeking an arrest warrant for Kim Se-ui of Hover Lab for fabricating and distributing the edited materials in order to generate attention for his YouTube channel.

== Death and funeral ==
On February 16, 2025, at 16:54 (KST), Kim was found dead by a friend in her home in Seongsu-dong, Seongdong District, Seoul. She was 24 years old. The next day, after an investigation, police officials ruled her death a suicide. Prior to her funeral, a wake was held at the Asan Medical Center in Seoul where several celebrities paid their respects. A private funeral was held at the same venue on the morning of February 19. She was temporarily placed at Tongil-ro Memorial Park in Paju, and buried at a third memorial service on February 21 at Utopia Memorial Park in Anseong.

Kwon Young-chan, head of a civic group working to prevent suicide among public figures, stated to reporters that Kim's father had informed him that she was deeply affected by scathing messages posted on social media that exposed parts of her private life. In the approximately 1,000 days between her drunk-driving crash in May 2022 and her death, South Korean mainstream news organizations published around 2,000 stories on Kim, many of which were sensational and negative. After the incident, YouTube gossip channels criticized her private life, claiming without evidence that she was exaggerating her financial struggles by working at coffee shops and showed a lack of remorse through social media posts. Yu Hyun-jae, a communications professor at Sogang University, noted that traditional media amplify unsubstantiated social media and YouTube drama claims, often bypassing fact-checking to drive viewership amid declining audience. Heo Chan-haeng, an executive director at the Center for Media Responsibility and Human Rights, stated after the actress's death: "Her private life was indiscriminately reported beyond what was necessary".

Her death drew harsh criticism of the harmful ways the media treats celebrities, which fosters a culture of harassment.

== Discography ==
=== Soundtrack appearance ===
Title	Year	Album
"The Phrase" (귀가)	2012	The Neighbor OST

== Awards and nominations ==
Name of the award ceremony, year presented, category, nominee of the award, and the result of the nomination
Award ceremony	Year	Category	Nominee / Work	Result	Ref.
Asian Film Awards	2010	Best Newcomer	A Brand New Life	Nominated	
Baeksang Arts Awards	2011	Best New Actress – Film	The Man from Nowhere	Nominated	
Baeksang Arts Awards	2015	Best Actress – Film	A Girl at My Door	Nominated	
Blue Dragon Film Awards	2014	Best New Actress	A Girl at My Door	Won	
Buil Film Awards	2010	Best New Actress	A Brand New Life	Won	
Buil Film Awards	2014	Best Supporting Actress	A Girl at My Door	Nominated	
Buster Copenhagen International Film Festival for Children and Youth	2010	Best Child Actor/Actress – Special Mention	A Brand New Life	Won	
Golden Cinematography Awards	2015	Best New Actress	A Girl at My Door	Won	
Golden Rooster and Hundred Flowers Film Festival	2015	Best Actress in a Foreign Film	Snowy Road	Won	
Grand Bell Awards	2014	Best New Actress	A Girl at My Door	Nominated	
KBS Drama Awards	2014	Best Young Actress	Hi! School: Love On	Nominated	
KBS Drama Awards	2015	Best Young Actress	Snowy Road	Nominated	
KBS Drama Awards	2021	Best Actress in a Drama Special/TV Cinema	KBS Drama Special: The Palace	Won	
Korea Drama Awards	2013	Best Young Actor/Actress	The Queen's Classroom	Nominated	
Korea Drama Awards	2016	Best New Actress	Secret Healer	Won	
Korean Film Awards	2010	Best New Actress	The Man from Nowhere	Won	
Max Movie Awards	2011	Best New Actress	The Man from Nowhere	Won	
MBC Drama Awards	2013	Best Young Actress (Note: Award shared with co-stars Kim Hyang-gi, Lee Young-yoo and Seo Shin-ae.)	The Queen's Classroom	Won	
MBC Entertainment Awards	2015	Female Rookie in Music/Talk Show	Show! Music Core	Nominated	
MBC Entertainment Awards	2016	Excellence Award in Music/Talk Show	Show! Music Core	Nominated	
Pierson Youth Film Festival	2013	Best Female Child Actress	Kim Sae-ron	Won	
Wildflower Film Awards	2015	Best Actress	A Girl at My Door	Nominated	

=== Other awards ===
Name of the award ceremony, year presented, category, nominee of the award, and the result of the nomination
Award ceremony	Year	Category	Nominee / Work	Ref.
Herald Donga Lifestyle Awards	2014	Style Icon of the Year	Kim Sae-ron	
Star Night - Korea Top Star Award	2014	Movie Actress Popularity Award	Kim Sae-ron	
