= I'm Your Boy =

- Limited edition CD cover (Type A)

Studio album by Shinee
- Released: September 24, 2014
- Studios: DCH (Seoul); In Grid (Seoul); Supalove (Tokyo)
- Genre: J-pop
- Length: 39:52
- Languages: Japanese; English
- Label: EMI

Shinee chronology
Everybody (2013)	I'm Your Boy (2014)	Odd (2015)

Singles from I'm Your Boy
- 1. "Boys Meet U" Released: August 21, 2013; 2. "3 2 1" Released: December 4, 2013; 3. "Lucky Star" Released: June 25, 2014

I'm Your Boy is the third Japanese studio album by South Korean boy band Shinee, released on September 24, 2014, in Japan by Universal Music Japan sublabel EMI Records. The album features three previously released singles, "Boys Meet U", "3 2 1" and "Lucky Star". It sold 45,000 copies during the first week of its release, marking the first time Shinee had reached the number one spot on the weekly chart since their Japanese debut in June 2011.

== Background and release ==
The album was released in three versions. A limited edition A containing a DVD, a 48-page photo booklet, and a photocard. The DVD includes the MV of "Boys Meet U", "3 2 1" and "Lucky Star" plus the Boys Meet U Special Showcase Live Movie. The limited edition B contains a DVD, a 48-page photo book, and a photocard. The DVD includes the MV of "Boys Meet U", "3 2 1" and "Lucky Star", plus the jacket shooting sketch and special interview about I'm Your Boy. The regular edition contains a 28-page photo book and a photocard.

== Singles ==
Three singles were spawned from the album, including "Boys Meet U" on August 21, 2013, which was certified gold in physical shipments of over 100,000 copies by the Recording Industry Association of Japan (RIAJ). "3 2 1" was made available on December 4, 2013.

"Lucky Star" was released as the third single on June 25, 2014, by Universal Music Japan sublabel EMI Records. This single was distributed in two versions—the limited edition came with a bonus DVD containing the music video, a sketch of the music video's making, a photo card (1 out of 6 random cards) and a 28-page photo booklet. The regular edition came with a 12-page photo booklet. The music video teaser for "Lucky Star" was released through the label's YouTube channel on May 19, 2014, and the short version of the music video was released on May 30.

== Promotion ==
Shinee performed "Downtown Baby" for the first time at Tokyo Girls Collection held at Saitama Super Arena on September 6, 2014. They also performed their debut song, "Replay (Kimi wa Boku no Everything)" and "Everybody". On September 24, 2014, Shinee held a showcase at Shinjuku Tower Records in front of over 2,500 fans to promote their upcoming album.

The group's Shinee World 2014 included songs from their third Japanese album, I'm Your Boy. They held a 30 show concert tour in 19 locations around Japan. The tour was divided in two according to the venue: a hall tour and an arena tour; from September 28, 2014, to December 14, 2014.

== Track listing ==
I'm Your Boy track listing
No.	Title	Lyrics	Music	Arrangement	Length
1.	"Downtown Baby"	Junji Ishiwatari	Steven Lee; Drew Ryan Scott; Andreas Öberg	Steven Lee	3:55
2.	"Lucky Star"	Sara Sakurai	Albi Albertsson (Mussashi); Stephan Elfgren; Steven Lee	Mussashi	3:23
3.	"Everybody" (Japanese version)	Sara Sakurai; Jo Yoon-kyung	Thomas Troelsen; Coach & Sendo; Yoo Young-jin	Coach & Sendo	4:09
4.	"Picasso"	Sara Sakurai	Andreas Stone Johansson; Denniz Jamm; Matt Wong; Steven Lee	Andreas Stone Johansson; Denniz Jamm	3:51
5.	"3 2 1"	Natsumi Kobayashi	Damon Sharpe; Eric Sanicola; Kendall Schmidt; Carlos Peña; James Maslow	Damon Sharpe; Eric Sanicola; Big Time Rush	3:33
6.	"365"	Akira (Palm Drive)	Jimmy Burney; Andreas Öberg; Eirik Johansen (Mental Audio); Jan Hallvard Larsen (Mental Audio)	Jimmy Burney; Andreas Öberg; Mental Audio	3:11
7.	"Sunny Day Hero"	Hidenori Tanaka (Agehasprings); Tom Hugo; Kim Bergseth	Kim Bergseth; Tom Hugo	Kim Bergseth	3:04
8.	"Perfect 10"	S-KEY-A	Mike Previti (Fission Music); Steve Horner (Fission Music)	Fission Music	2:44
9.	"Bounce"	Amon Hayashi	Erik Lidbom	Erik Lidbom	3:25
10.	"Dream Girl" (Japanese version)	Hidenori Tanaka (Agehasprings); Jeon Gan-di; Minho	Hyuk Shin (Joombas); DK (Joombas); Jordan Kyle; Ross Lara (Joombas); David Cook (Joombas)	Joombas; Jordan Kyle	3:10
11.	"Colors of the Season"	Sara Sakurai	Andreas Stone Johansson; Caroline Gustavsson; Takarot	Takarot	4:29
12.	"Boys Meet U"	Sara Sakurai; Lindy Robbins; Ian Kirkpatrick; Matt Squire	Lindy Robbins; Matt Squire; Ian Kirkpatrick	Matt Squire; Ian Kirkpatrick	3:15
Total length:					42:09

== Charts ==
=== Weekly charts ===
Chart performance for I'm Your Boy
Chart (2014)	Peak position
Japanese Albums (Oricon)	1
South Korean Albums (Gaon)	9

=== Monthly charts ===
Monthly chart performance for I'm Your Boy
Chart (2014)	Peak position
Japanese Albums (Oricon)	7
South Korean Albums (Gaon)	25
