= I Am a Dad =

- Theatrical poster
- Directed by: Jeon Man-bae; Lee Se-yeong
- Written by: Yoon Hyeon-ho
- Produced by: Kang Mun-seok; Park Kang-mi; Park Mi-jeong
- Starring: Kim Seung-woo; Son Byong-ho; Kim Sae-ron
- Cinematography: Lee Chang-jae
- Edited by: Park Gok-ji
- Music by: Hwang Sang-jun
- Distributed by: Lotte Entertainment
- Release date: 14 April 2011
- Running time: 99 minutes
- Country: South Korea
- Language: Korean

I Am a Dad (Korean: 나는 아빠다; RR: Naneun appada), also known as I Am Father, is a 2011 South Korean action drama film co-directed by Jeon Man-bae and Lee Se-yeong, and written by Yoon Hyeon-ho. It stars Kim Seung-woo as a corrupt cop who frames innocent people. But when his daughter (Kim Sae-ron) gets injured because of his work and needs a heart transplant, he discovers that the heart would come from the wife of a magician (Son Byong-ho) he framed for murder.

== Plot ==
Han Jong-sik (Kim Seung-woo) is a corrupt detective who frames innocent people to further his career. One of his victims takes his revenge on Jong-sik by killing his wife and injuring his daughter, Min-ji (Kim Sae-ron), who is now in need of a heart transplant. To help his sick daughter, he starts working for a mob boss who deals in organ trafficking. Na Sang-man (Son Byong-ho), a magician and one of the people he falsely accused of murder, discovers that his daughter is dead and his wife is in a coma because of a suicide attempt. Now, the only thing on his mind is vengeance. He is released after two years behind bars when the officials find out by accident that he is innocent. He tracks down Detective Kim (Im Ha-ryong), Jong-sik's colleague, to re-open the murder case. Meanwhile, Soo-kyung (Choi Jung-yoon), the organ transplant coordinator, locates a heart for Min-ji, but Jong-sik finds out that the heart is from Sang-man's wife. Realizing that Sang-man would not allow the transplant, he finds a way to get rid of him. Sang-man discovers his plans and kidnaps his daughter.

== Cast ==
- Kim Seung-woo as Han Jong-sik
- Son Byong-ho as Na Sang-man
- Kim Sae-ron as Han Min-ji
- Im Ha-ryong as Detective Kim
- Choi Jung-yoon as Soo-kyung
- Cheon Seong-hun as Gi-bok
- Oh Yoon-hong as Ji-young
- Roh Jeong-eui as Na Ye-seul
- Jo Deok-hyeon as Owner Hwang
- Choi Hong-il as Chief detective
- Park Choong-seon as Owner Jo
- Geum Dong-hyun as gang boss at the funeral hall
- Lee Won-jong as organ trafficking doctor (cameo)
- Kim Ki-yeon as Jong-sik's wife
