= The Great Shaman Ga Doo-shim =

2021 South Korean streaming television series

- Promotional poster
- Also known as: Excellent Shaman Ga Doo-shim
- Hangul: 우수무당 가두심
- RR: Usu mudang Ga Dusim
- MR: Usu mudang Ka Tusim
- Genre: Fantasy; Mystery; Romance
- Created by: Kakao Entertainment
- Written by: Joo Brothers
- Directed by: Park Ho-jin
- Starring: Kim Sae-ron; Nam Da-reum
- Country of origin: South Korea
- Original language: Korean
- No. of seasons: 1
- No. of episodes: 12

Production
- Executive producers: Lee Young-suk; Park Mae-hee
- Producer: Song Je-young
- Cinematography: Jang Jong-kyung
- Editor: Oh Sang-hwan
- Running time: 20 minutes
- Production company: MAYS Entertainment

Original release
- Network: KakaoTV
- Release: July 30 – October 8, 2021

The Great Shaman Ga Doo-shim (Korean: 우수무당 가두심) is a South Korean web series, starring Kim Sae-ron and Nam Da-reum. It is KakaoTV's first original fantasy mystery series and premiered on July 30, 2021, at 20:00 Korean Standard Time (KST), also airing three hours later on another local streaming website, Watcha. Internationally, it is distributed by iQIYI (in Southeast Asia and Taiwan) and by Viki (in US, Europe, Middle East, Oceania and India).

== Synopsis ==
Ga Doo-shim (Kim Sae-ron), an 18-year-old girl born with the fate of becoming a shaman, tries to live a normal life. Her grandmother told her if she manages to survive being 18, she can live a normal life thereafter. Later when her grandmother tells her mother that she found the spirit she lost to capture is actually in Songyong High school, she urges Doo-shim's mother to transfer to that school. She transfers to the new high school and meets Na Woo-soo (Nam Da-reum). Na Woo-soo, who is handsome, gets outstanding grades and comes from a wealthy family, gains the ability to see evil spirits after meeting Ga Doo-shim when her grandmother possesses him for some time to tell Ga Doo-shim that the evil spirit she encountered while she was a kid is actually here in their school. Eventually, Na Woo-soo and Ga Doo-shim become friends. This spirit that is present in their school is actually an evil spirit that possesses the students who get the lowest score and makes them take their own life usually by suicide (jumping off the school building). This fear of getting low score might take their life, makes student study harder making their school one of the most prestigious. But this takes a turn when Na Woo soo discovers that the next student to fall into this trap is actually his own friend Kim Il-nam–the lowest scorer of the exam. Na Woo-soo with Ga Doo-shim decide to save him. And with the help of Hyun-soo (another dead student soul, also the victim of this evil spirit who lost his life and now friends with Ga Doo-shim) they keep Il-nam safe. As they (Woo-soo and Doo-shim) go on to take down the spirit that takes away their own friends from the school, Hyun-soo tells Doo-shim that it's actually their school's principal who is behind all this, and Doo-shim suspects him to have killed her grandmother. Later, Doo-shim and Woo-soo together fight the demon and the principal is dead. And they start their school life without any worries to die. They meet ill-nam and Hyun-so leaves to meet his mother.

== Cast ==
- Kim Sae-ron as Ga Doo-shim. A teenager who has the ability to see spirits. Her grandmother died while trapping an evil spirit which made her cold and indifferent to spirits. She falls for Woo-soo while teaming up with him to drive the evil spirit away.
  - Jo Shi-yeon as young Ga Doo-shim
- Nam Da-reum as Na Woo-soo. Doo-shim's classmate and the topper. He is from a rich family. He gets the ability to see ghosts after a small incident and later falls for Doo-shim.
- Yoo Seon-ho as Hyun-soo. An innocent spirit, he died because of the evil spirit. He had been waiting to meet his mother and often annoys and helps Doo-shim.
- Moon Sung-keun as Kyung-pil. The principal of the school Doo-shim and Woo-soo study in. He harbours a secret.
- Yoon Seok-hwa as Myo-shim. Doo-shim's grandmother and Hyo-shim's mother. She was a shaman who dies while catching the evil spirit.
- Bae Hae-sun as Hyo-shim. A shaman and Doo-shim's mother. Even though she seems materialistic, she cares for her daughter.
- Yoon Jung-hoon as Kim Il-Nam. He is Woo-soo's best friend who doesn't focus on studying. He helps his mother managing her small stall.
- Lee Ji-won as Soo-Jung
- Park Yong as Sung-Wook
- Baek Soo-jang as Teacher Sa
- Jung Min-kyul as Ae-kyung

=== Special appearances ===
- Kim Sung-oh as Sound of evil spirits (voice)
- Park Gwang-jae as

== Production ==
The Great Shaman Ga Doo-shim is created by Kakao Entertainment, written by Joo Brothers, directed by Park Ho-jin, and produced by MAYS Entertainment (the company behind the 2020 dramas Missing: The Other Side and Run On, and movies Romang (2019) and The Divine Move (2014 and 2019)). It is KakaoTV's first original fantasy mystery series.

On April 27, 2021, media reported that Kim Sae-ron was in talks to star in the series; her agency, Gold Medalist, confirmed that she was positively reviewing the offer. On May 6, Kim Sae-ron was confirmed to co-star alongside Nam Da-reum. On the same day, Kakao Entertainment announced that they were starting the full-scale production with plans to start filming in May and to premiere it in the second half of the year. Yoo Seon-ho officially joined the cast on June 24.

Script reading photos and video were shared on Kakao TV's social media accounts on July 2. On July 9, first teaser video and poster were released, and was announced that episode one and two would be released on July 30, at 20:00 Korean Standard Time (KST).
