= Secret Healer =

2016 South Korean television series

- Promotional poster
- Genre: Historical; Fantasy; Romance; Comedy
- Written by: Yang Hyuk-moon
- Directed by: Jo Hyun-tak; Shim Na-yeon
- Starring: Yoon Shi-yoon; Kim Sae-ron; Lee Sung-jae; Yum Jung-ah; Kwak Si-yang
- Country of origin: South Korea
- Original language: Korean
- No. of episodes: 20

Production
- Executive producers: Choi Joon-hyeong; Ji Sung-wook; Lee Mi-ji; Park Joon-seo
- Producers: Kim Eun-young; Lee Se-young
- Running time: 70 minutes
- Production companies: Apollo Pictures; Drama House; Media & Art

Original release
- Network: JTBC
- Release: May 13 – July 16, 2016

Secret Healer (Korean: 마녀보감; Hanja: 魔女寶鑑; RR: Manyeobogam; lit. 'Mirror of the Witch'), is a 2016 South Korean television series starring Yoon Shi-yoon, Kim Sae-ron, Lee Sung-jae, Yum Jung-ah and Kwak Si-yang. The story of the series is inspired by the book titled Dongui Bogam. It aired on cable network JTBC's Fridays and Saturdays at 20:30 (KST) time slot from May 13 to July 16, 2016 for 20 episodes.

== Synopsis ==
Queen Shim (Jang Hee-jin), is a royal queen in the palace who, unable to have a child, seeks the help of a shaman named Hong-joo (Yum Jung-ah) to give birth to a prince. Hong-joo tells Queen Shim to deceive a young shaman named Hae-ran (Jung In-seon) who possesses special abilities enabling her to sleep with the king so she can become pregnant. Hong-joo then uses black magic to transfer the fetus to the Queen and plans to kill Hae-ran. Unfortunately, Hae-ran finds out everything, and foretells the sad fate of the Queen's babies before dying. Queen Shim later gives birth to twins, Crown Prince Soonhwae (Yeo Hoe-hyun) and princess Yeon-hee (Kim Sae-ron), but is forced to abandon the princess due to the curse. With the help of Shaman Choi Hyun-seo (Lee Sung-jae), Yeon-hee grows up as a beautiful young girl, but she is forced to remain isolated and away from everyone, living in a house surrounded by talismans. Poong-yeon (Kwak Si-yang), Hyun-seo's son, has had a crush on her since he was young. A young scholar named Heo Jun (Yoon Shi-yoon), the son of a slave and a rich master, has a chance encounter with Yeon-hee and Heo Jun ties their fate as they journey together to lift the princess' curse which causes everyone she loves to die an awful death.

== Cast ==
=== Main ===
- Yoon Shi-yoon as Heo Jun
- Kim Sae-ron as Princess Seo-ri / Yeon-hee
- Lee Sung-jae as Choi Hyun-seo
- Yum Jung-ah as Shaman Choi Hong-joo
- Kwak Si-yang as Poong-yeon

=== Supporting ===
==== Royal household ====
- Jang Hee-jin as Queen Shim
- Lee Ji-hoon as King Seonjo
- Yeo Hoe-hyun as Crown Prince Soonhwoe

==== People of Sogyeokseo ====
- Lee Yi-kyung as Yo-kwang
- N/A as Cheon-choo
- N/A as Cheon-kwon
- N/A as Ok-hyung
- N/A as Gae-yang

==== Heo Jun's family ====
- Jo Dal-hwan as Heo Ok
- N/A as Heo Yoon

=== Extended ===
- Moon Ga-young as Sol-gae, Poong-yeon's confidant and escort warrior
- Min Do-hee as Soon-deuk, Heo Jun's assistant
- Choi Sung-won as Dong-rae, the one and only friend of Heo-jun also a merchant from Sangdan
- Hwang Young-hee as Ms. Jeong
- Hwang Mi-young as So-yaeng
- Kim Seo-yeon as an escort maid
- Kim Chae-eun as Moo-mae
- Song Jae-in as a Ginyeo
- Jung Yoo-min as Hwa-jin
- Kim So-hye as Mi-hyang
- Kim Jong-hoon as Bat-soe
- Kim Yong-ho
- Kim Won-jin
- Kwon Hyuk-poong
- Song Yong-ho
- Kim Seung-pil
- Lee Ga-kyung
- Go Eun-min
- Song Kyung-hwa
- Son Young-soon
- Lee Gyu-bok
- Nam Tae-boo
- Kwon Hyeok-soo
- Moon Soo-jong
- Yoo Il-han
- Seok Bo-bae
- Jang Yong-cheol
- Ahn Min-sang
- Park Se-jin
- Yoo Seung-il
- Seol Joo-mi

=== Special appearances ===
- Kim Young-ae as Queen Yoon
- Lee David as King Myeongjong
- Jung In-sun as Hae-ran, Seo-ri's mother
- Yoon Bok-in as Mrs. Ok, Poong-yeon's mother
- Jeon Mi-seon as Mrs. Son, Heo Jun's stepmother
- Kim Hee-jung as Mrs. Kim
- Shim Hoon-gi as Jong Sa-gwan
- Lee Cho-hee as Kisaeng Man-wol
- Park Chul-min as a People in Sadang
- Im Hyun-sung as Too Jun-kkoon
- Kang Han-na as Queen Park
- Kim Kap-soo as Heo Jun after 40 years
- Ahn Gil-kang as a Mysterious man
- Nam Da-reum as Heo Jun's disciple

== Ratings ==
In this table, the blue numbers represent the lowest ratings and the red numbers represent the highest ratings.

Ep.	Original broadcast date	Title	Average audience share		
Ep.	Original broadcast date	Title	AGB Nielsen		TNmS
Ep.	Original broadcast date	Title	Nationwide	Seoul	Nationwide
1	May 13, 2016	A Cursed Child (저주가 깃든 아이)	2.606%	2.401%	2.2%
2	May 14. 2016	That Kite! I Will Bring It Back (저 연! 제가 가져 오겠습니다)	1.830%	2.063%	1.9%
3	May 20, 2016	Everyone is Born For a Reason (사람은 누구나 태어난 이유가 있어)	2.422%	2.616%	2.2%
4	May 21, 2016	Do You Want To Save Everyone? You Only Have To Die. Only You (모두를 살리고 싶으냐? 너만 죽으면 된다. 너만)	1.903%	<2.106%	1.7%
5	May 27, 2016	Please, Don't Leave Me (제발 절 두고 가지 마세요)	2.545%	2.631%	2.2%
6	May 28, 2016	We Will Meet Again in Front of Despair and Fate (절망과 운명 앞에서 다시 만나다)	2.705%	3.225%	2.0%
7	June 4, 2016	"My Lord, It is Starting Again." Hinting Misfortune ("대감 이제 다시 시작입니다." 불행 암시)	2.986%	3.112%	2.2%
8	June 4, 2016	Heo Joon, grab the approaching Yeon Hee "Hong ssi..?" (허준, 다가오는 연희 잡고 아련 "홍시..?")	2.525%	2.683%	2.2%
9	June 10, 2016	Heo Jun, You'll See. "I am Your Choice" (허준, 나가보면 알겠지. "내가 너의 결계가 맞는지")	2.380%	2.589%	2.1%
10	June 11, 2016	Attacked by the 'Red Gentleman's Robe'! ('붉은 도포'에 습격당하다!)	2.004%	<2.276%	1.7%
11	June 17, 2016	Whatever You Look Like, to me it's all the same Yeon Hee (네가 어떤 모습이든 나에겐 다 똑같은 연희다)	2.260%	2.467%	2.2%
12	June 18, 2016	Please Don't Go (제발 가지마)	2.095%	<2.634%	1.7%
13	June 24, 2016	Yeon Hee who has entered the palace, declares war to Hong Joo (궁으로 들어간 '공주' 서리, 홍주에 선전포고)	2.797%	3.003%	2.3%
14	June 25, 2016	Stick The Knife In! (칼을 꽂다!)	1.692%	<2.143%	1.6%
15	July 1, 2016	Heo Jun, I have to solve my ancestral black magic! (허준, 선조가 걸린 흑주술을 풀어야만 한다!)	2.742%	3.017%	2.4%
16	July 2, 2016	Heo Jun's Worn-out Ebony Sword (홍주가 휘두른 흑단검에 쓰러진 풍연)	1.797%	<2.058%	1.6%
17	July 8, 2016	??????? (허준 - 연희, 남은 시간만이라도 함께 있게 해주세요)	2.322%	2.184%	1.9%
18	July 9, 2016	??????? (절벽에 떨어진 허준 - 폭주하는 연희)	1.697%	<2.218%	1.6%
19	July 15, 2016	??????? (허준, 연희 살리기 위해 고군분투 "너를 위해 살 거다")	2.709%	3.182%	2.1%
20	July 16, 2016	???????	2.773%	2.944%	1.9%
Average			2.340%	<2.578% (Note: Lack of information)	2.0%

- This drama airs on a cable channel/pay TV which normally has a relatively smaller audience compared to free-to-air TV/public broadcasters (KBS, SBS and MBC and EBS).

== Original soundtrack ==
Secret Healer OST

Soundtrack album by Various Artists
- Released: 2016
- Genre: Soundtrack
- Language: Korean
- Label: KT Music

=== OST Part 1 ===
No.	Title	Artist	Length
1.	"Love (연)"	Lush	3:50
2.	"Love (연)" (Inst.)		3:50
Total length:			7:40

=== OST Part 2 ===
No.	Title	Artist	Length
1.	"You For Just One Day (단 하루만 너를)"	Jeon Sang-geun	3:15
2.	"You For Just One Day (단 하루만 너를)" (Inst.)		3:15
Total length:			6:30

=== OST Part 3 ===
No.	Title	Artist	Length
1.	"Distressed (달)"	Lim Jeong-hee	3:42
2.	"Distressed (달)" (Inst.)		3:42
Total length:			7:24

=== OST Part 4 ===
No.	Title	Artist	Length
1.	"Always (늘)"	Way, Choa (Crayon Pop)	4:00
2.	"Always (늘)" (Inst.)		4:00
Total length:			8:00

== Remark ==
Episode 7 did not air on Friday June 3 due to the broadcast of the 52nd Paeksang Arts Awards. This episode was aired on Saturday June 4, the same day as episode 8.

== Awards and nominations ==
Year	Award	Category	Recipient	Result
2016	9th Korea Drama Awards	Best New Actress	Kim Sae-ron	Won
