= Manhole (2014 film) =

- Theatrical release poster
- Directed by: Shin Jae-young
- Written by: Moon Bong-seop; Shin Jae-young
- Produced by: Kim Min-gi
- Starring: Jung Kyung-ho; Jung Yu-mi; Kim Sae-ron
- Cinematography: Jo Yeong-cheon
- Edited by: Choi Jae-geun; Kim So-yeon
- Music by: Hwang Sang-jun; Ma Sang-woo
- Distributed by: Lotte Entertainment
- Release date: October 8, 2014
- Running time: 100 minutes
- Country: South Korea
- Language: Korean

Manhole (Korean: 맨홀) is a 2014 South Korean thriller directed by Shin Jae-young.

== Plot ==
The serial killer Soo-chul (Jung Kyung-ho) has been terrorizing a neighborhood in Seoul, and in the span of 6 months, 10 people have disappeared without a trace. He uses a manhole to trap his victims. His latest abductee is Soo-jung (Kim Sae-ron), a 14-year-old girl, and her older sister Yeon-seo (Jung Yu-mi) is desperate to find her before time runs out.

== Cast ==
- Jung Kyung-ho as Soo-chul
- Jung Yu-mi as Yeon-seo
- Kim Sae-ron as Soo-jung
- Choi Deok-moon as Kim Jong-ho, taxi driver
- Jo Dal-hwan as Pil-gyu, policeman
- Lee Young-yoo as Kim Song-yi, Jong-ho's daughter
- Yoon Chan-young as Soo-chul (young)
- Sung Yu-bin as Feral boy
- Kim Bin-woo as Female victim
- Seo Hyun-woo as Policeman
- Kim Mi-hee as Policewoman
- Kim Gu-taek as Choi
