= Everybody (EP) =

EP by Shinee
- Released: October 14, 2013
- Recorded: 2013
- Studios: Doobdoob (Seoul); In Grid (Seoul); Kzlab (Seoul); Rui (Seoul); SM Big Shot (Seoul); SM Blue Cup (Seoul); SM Blue Ocean (Seoul); Sound Pool (Seoul)
- Genres: Electropop, R&B
- Length: 26:50
- Languages: Korean; English
- Labels: SM, KT Music
- Producers: Coach & Sendo; The Underdogs; Kenzie; Trinity Music; Andrew Jackson; Anne Judith Wik; Herbie Crichlow; Erik Lidbom; Jean Beauvoir; Michelle Andrea Escoffery; Jinbo; Stephan Elfgren; Anders Wigelius

Shinee chronology
The Misconceptions of Us (2013)	Everybody (2013)	I'm Your Boy (2014)

Singles from Everybody
- 1. "Everybody" Released: October 14, 2013

Everybody is the fifth EP recorded and performed by the South Korean contemporary R&B idol group Shinee. The EP consists of seven tracks and it incorporates complextro and R&B-slow jam music genres. It was released for physical purchase domestically and for digital download globally on October 14, 2013, by SM Entertainment. The track "Everybody" was chosen as the lead single for the promotional cycle. To promote the album, Shinee appeared on several South Korean music programs including M Countdown and Inkigayo.

Everybody received positive reviews from music critics—Jakob Dorof of Tiny Mix Tapes praised the album for showcasing the experimental and versatile nature of Shinee's music, and Billboard's Jeff Benjamin positively viewed the group's attempt at EDM, stating the group found the balance of hyperactive EDM and pop stylings. The EP was commercially successful in South Korea and topped the Gaon Album Chart, selling more than 140,000 copies. This is the group's final Korean EP to feature Jonghyun, who died in December 2017.

== Background and release ==
On October 4, 2013, SM Entertainment released the lyric video for a new song, "Symptoms", which was written by Jonghyun. It was composed by The Underdogs, who previously worked on Shinee's songs "Juliette," "Spoiler," and "Selene 6.23". Shinee released Everybody digitally and physically on October 14. The group began their promotions for the title song "Everybody" on October 10, starting with Mnet's M Countdown, and ended their promotions on November 17, 2013, on Inkigayo. After the release, the album charted high in Taiwan and debuted at number one on the Gaon Album Chart. Shinee performed the title track "Everybody" for the first time during the 2013 Gangnam Hallyu Festival.

Everybody contains a total of seven songs, including the title song "Everybody" and "Symptoms". The outfits for the album cover and the "Everybody" music video were from American designer Thom Browne's 2014 S/S Collection. For the album, many hit makers participated such as Thomas Troelsen, The Underdogs, Kenzie, and Jinbo. The title song "Everybody" is classified under the "complextro" genre and was choreographed by Tony Testa, who previously worked with Shinee on their past title tracks "Sherlock (Clue + Note)" and "Dream Girl". SM Entertainment performance director Hwang Sanghoon (also known as Greg) also participated in planning the choreography. The music video for "Everybody" was released on October 10. On December 20, Shinee released a music video for "Colorful" to thank their fans for their long continuous support. It includes video clips of the members' 2013 promotional activities. As of 2014, the EP has sold more than 140,000 copies.

== Promotional singles ==
- "Symptoms", a slow jam genre song, was the first track from the EP to be unveiled. An accompanying lyric video was uploaded on October 4, 2013. It was the second song the group promoted alongside the title track "Everybody".
- "Everybody", the title track, is of the complextro genre. The music video for the song was released on October 10, 2013.
- "Close the Door", a modern waltz song, was the third track to be announced and was first performed live during the October 13 episode of Inkigayo. According to the domestic music portal site Naver Music, the instrumental piece used an intricate mix of synth stings and chords to produce a "beautiful" melody which couples perfectly with the lullaby-like lyrics of the song – that reinvents the relatively "prehistoric" music style in the Korean music industry. The song was engineered by the veteran South Korean hip hop artist-songwriter Jinbo.
- "Colorful" is a "bright medium-tempo" song and the fifth one to be promoted from the album. It was performed live during their SM Town Week – The Wizard concert stage on December 21, 2013. A Christmas special music video was unveiled a day before featuring the group's activities throughout the year.

== Critical reception ==
Jakob Dorof of Tiny Mix Tapes gave the EP a rating of 4.5 out of 5 stars. He writes that "Everybody will never be anybody's Pet Sounds, I'm Still In Love With You, Discovery, Meets Rockers Uptown, A Love Supreme, or even FutureSex/LoveSounds—but we're getting closer. The recent Pink Tape album by f(x)—a group engineered by SM Entertainment to be the female derivative of Shinee, one of their most successful boy bands—marked a big step forward, and now f(x)'s brother-progenitors have taken things even further. A seven-song mini-album (Korea's format of choice), Everybody makes for a leaner listen than the full-length Pink Tape and by some criteria may rank less impressive. But if we are searching for singular listens—ones devoid of filler, focus groupthink, or ill-fitting raps—then Everybody is K-pop's most sustained statement to date." Dorof remarked that "Close the Door" highlights the experimental and versatile nature of Shinee's music which frequently charts into unfamiliar territories.

Jeff Benjamin of Billboard praised the title track, "Everybody", stating, "Shinee crams in loads of dubstep alongside bleeps, bloops, build-ups and breakdowns. The electronic overload is topped off with sweet boy band harmonies, resulting in an easy-to-digest electro-pop track". The choreography, however, was the highlight for the columnist, describing it as "the most impressive point of Shinee's comeback".

== Track listing ==
Everybody track listing
No.	Title	Lyrics	Music	Arrangement	Length
1.	"Everybody"	Jo Yoon-kyung	Thomas Troelsen; Coach & Sendo; Yoo Young-jin	Coach & Sendo	4:09
2.	"Symptoms" (상사병; Sangsabyeong; lit. 'Lovesick')	Jonghyun	Harvey Mason Jr.; Damon Thomas	The Underdogs	3:49
3.	"Queen of New York" (빗 속 뉴욕; Bis Sok Nyu-yok)	Kenzie	Kenzie; Kim Jeong-bae; Andrew Choi	Kenzie	3:19
4.	"One Minute Back" (1분만; 1 Bunman)	Jeon Gan-di	Sebastian Lundberg (Trinity Music); Fredrik Häggstam (Trinity Music); Johan Gustafsson (Trinity Music); Andrew Jackson	Trinity Music; Jackson	3:43
5.	"Destination"	Jeon; Minho^{[a]}	Anne Judith Wik; Herbert St. Clair Crichlow; Erik Lidbom; Jean Beauvoir; Michelle Andrea Escoffery	Wik; Crichlow; Lidbom; Beauvoir; Escoffery	3:40
6.	"Close the Door" (닫아줘; Dad-ajwo)	Jinbo (Superfreak Records); Minho^{[a]}	Jinbo	Jinbo	4:01
7.	"Colorful"	Jeon; Minho^{[a]}; Key^{[b]}	Stephan Elfgren; Anders Wigelius	Elfgren; Wigelius	4:07
Total length:					26:50

- ^{^[a]} Minho is credited for writing the song's rap.
- ^{^[b]} Key is credited for writing the song's rap.

== Charts ==
=== Weekly charts ===
Weekly chart performance for Everybody
Chart (2013)	Peak position
Japanese Albums (Oricon)	7
South Korean Albums (Gaon)	1
US Heatseekers Albums (Billboard)	20
US World Albums (Billboard)	2

=== Monthly charts ===
Monthly chart performance for Everybody
Chart (2013)	Peak position
South Korean Albums (Gaon)	1

== Release history ==
Release history and formats for Everybody
Region	Date	Format	Edition	Label	Ref.
South Korea	October 14, 2013	CD; digital download; streaming	Korean	SM Entertainment; KT Music	
Various	October 14, 2013	Digital download; streaming	Korean	SM Entertainment	
Taiwan	November 6, 2013	CD	Korean	Avex Taiwan	
Taiwan	November 18, 2013	CD	Taiwanese	Avex Taiwan	
