= Ounie Lecomte =

Korean-French filmmaker (born 1966)

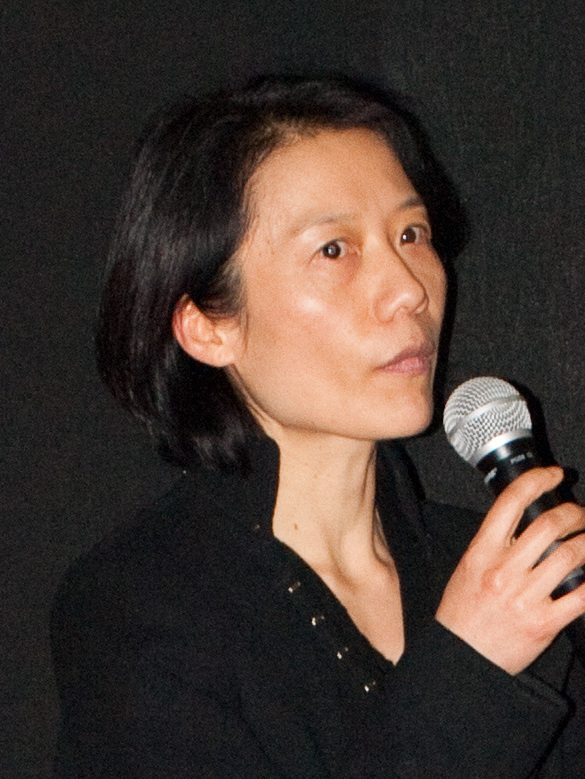
- Lecomte in 2010
- Born: 1966 (age 59–60); Seoul
- Known for: semi-autobiographical films

Ounie Lecomte (born 1966) is a South Korean-born French film director, writer and actress. Her semi-autobiographical debut film won her a best director award at the 40th International Film Festival of India.

== Life ==
Lecomte was born in Seoul on 17 November 1966. Her parents divorced, something socially unacceptable at the time, and at age 9, her family abandoned her. Between 1975 and 1976, she was placed at the St. Paul orphanage in Seoul though she was not an orphan. She was adopted by a couple in France as one of 160,000 legal international adoptions, more than any other country in the 1990s. Her adoptive father was a pastor and his wife lived in the Parisian suburb of Saint-Germain-en-Laye. Though being 10 years of age, she was placed at a nursery to learn French.

She studied fashion design and designed costumes for films.

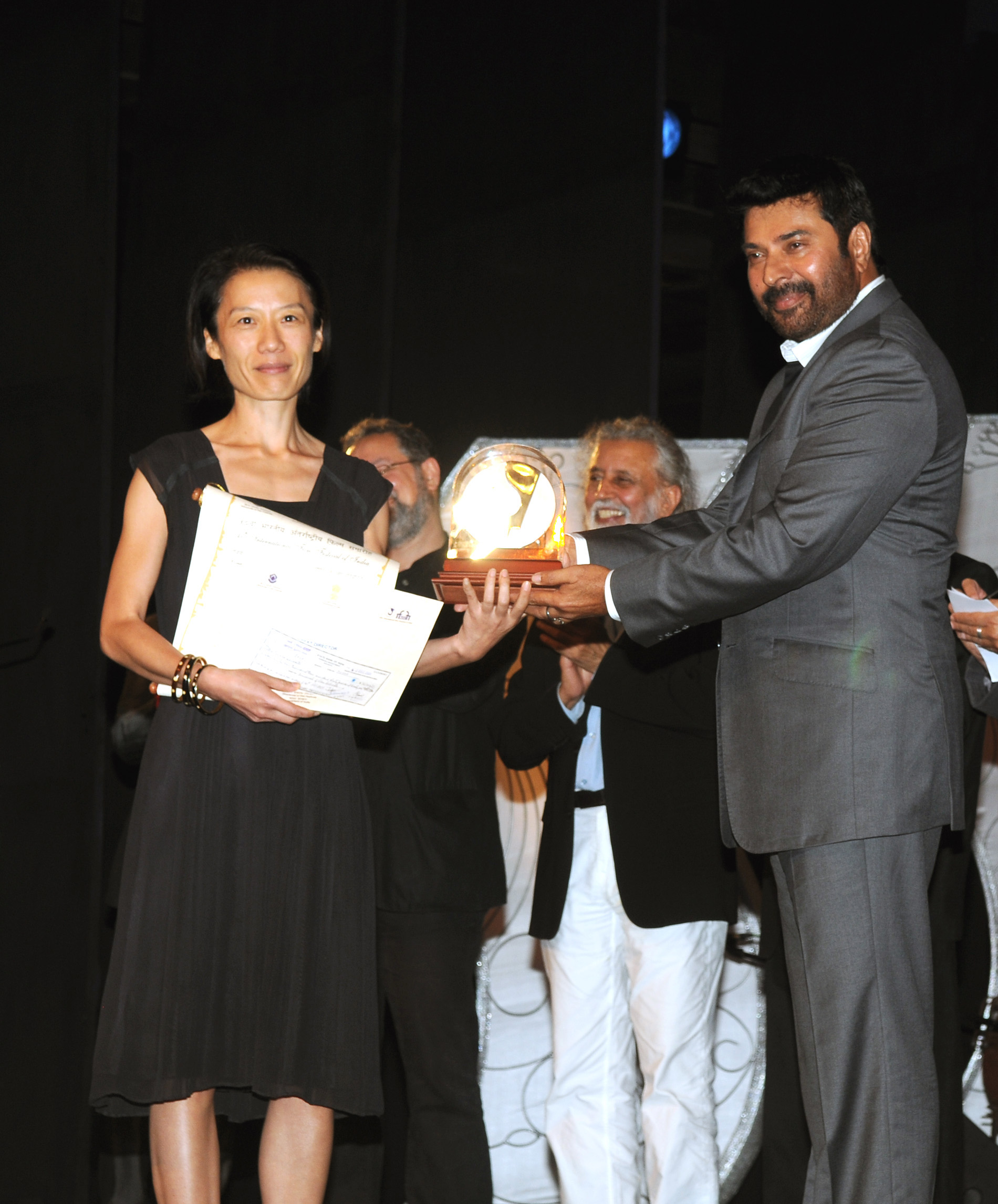
Actor-director Mammooty presenting the Best Director's award to Ounie Lecomte for A Brand New Life

She gained her first major role in a 1991 film about a family, Paris Awakens, directed by Olivier Assayas.

Lecomte wrote a screenplay based on her life that she started during a screenwriting course in 2006. Lee Chang-dong became the film's producer. The movie focused on her early life and the trauma of her adoption. Lecomte found that she had forgotten how to speak Korean fluently and though she tried, she could not easily regain it.

Her film was released in South Korea in 2009 and France in 2010. It was shown at the Cannes Film Festival and she was won Best Director for A Brand New Life, at the 40th International Film Festival of India (IFFI-2009), at Panaji, Goa in December 2009.

In 2015, she directed Looking for Her, another film based on her life that deals with issues surrounding adoption. It looks at contact with birth parents and the rights of those involved and issues of race. It was considered more ambitious than her first film.
