= Symptoms (song) =

Song by Shinee

from the EP Everybody
- Released: October 14, 2013
- Recorded: 2013
- Studio: SM Studios (Seoul, South Korea)
- Genre: Slow jam; R&B
- Length: 3:49
- Label: SM Entertainment
- Songwriters: Jonghyun; The Underdogs
- Producer: The Underdogs

"Symptoms" (Korean: 상사병; RR: Sangsabyeong) is a K-pop song performed by the South Korean idol group Shinee. It is included as the second track in their fifth EP, Everybody, which was released digitally on October 14, 2013 under the record label of SM Entertainment and distributing label of KMP Holdings.

== Background ==
The domestic music portal site Naver Music described "Symptoms" as belonging to the slow jam genre with influence from Shinee's signature contemporary R&B style. The song was composed and arranged by the international music production team The Underdogs in their first collaboration with Shinee. It also marked their debut in the Korean pop music industry. The lyrics were penned by Shinee's main vocalist Jonghyun.

== Promotion ==
"Symptoms" was first unveiled through a lyric video uploaded to SM Town's official YouTube channel on October 4, 2013. The first live performance of the song was included in the set-list of the Shinee Comeback Special at Gangnam Hallyu Festival on October 6, in Samseong-dong, Seoul. The performances were streamed on SM Town's YouTube channel. The first broadcast live performance, however, was through Mnet's music show M Countdown on October 10, 2013. This was followed by performances at KBS Music Bank on October 11, MBC Show! Music Core on October 12, SBS Inkigayo on October 13, and MBC Mì Show Champion on October 16, 2013.

== Critical reception ==
"Symptoms" received generally positive reviews from critics. Jakob Dorof of Vice considered it one of the best K-pop songs of the year, writing that "the RnB wooze of "Symptoms" feels especially right for 2013". Billboard described it as "an evocative tune that plays up the quintet’s strengths and versatility", lauding it as "one of the best boy band songs ever crafted".

== Chart performance ==
Weekly chart performance for "Symptoms"
Chart (2013)	Peak position
South Korea (Gaon)	12
US World Digital Song Sales (Billboard)	5
