= Your Number (Shinee song) =

- Regular edition cover

Single by Shinee

from the album D×D×D
- Language: Japanese
- B-side: "Love"
- Released: March 11, 2015
- Recorded: 2015
- Studio: InGrid (Seoul)
- Genre: J-pop; R&B
- Length: 4:19
- Label: EMI Records
- Composers: Chris Meyer; Kevin Charge
- Lyricist: Junji Ishiwatari
- Producer: Nozomu Tsuchiya

Shinee singles chronology
"Lucky Star" (2014)	"Your Number" (2015)	"View" (2015)

Music video
- "Your Number" Dance version (Black) on YouTube

"Your Number" is the eleventh Japanese single by South Korean boy group Shinee. The single was released on March 11, 2015 by Universal Music Japan sublabel EMI Records.

== Background and release ==
This single comes in two versions. The limited edition comes with a bonus DVD containing the music video, a sketch of the music video's making, a photo card (1 out of 5 random cards) and a 16-page photo booklet. The regular edition comes with a photo card (1 out of 5 random cards). The music video teaser for "Your Number" was released through Universal Music Japan's YouTube channel on February 20, 2015 and the dance version of the music video was released on March 10, 2015.

== Track listing ==
Limited editions and CD only regular edition:
No.	Title	Lyrics	Music	Arranger(s)	Length
1.	"Your Number"	Junji Ishiwatari	Chris Meyer; Kevin Charge		4:19
2.	"Love"	Sakurai	Kenzie	Takefumi Haketa	4:22
3.	"Your Number" (Instrumental)		Chris Meyer; Kevin Charge		4:18
Total length:					13:00

DVD (Limited Edition)
No.	Title	Length
1.	"Your Number Music Video"
2.	"Your Number Jacket & Music Video Shooting Sketch"

== Charts and sales ==
Chart performance for "Your Number"
Chart (2015)	Peak position
Japan (Oricon)	2
Japan (Hot 100) (Billboard Japan)	3

=== Sales ===
Region	Certification	Certified units/sales
Japan (RIAJ) Physical single	Gold	100,000^{^}
^{^} Shipments figures based on certification alone.

== Release history ==
Release history for "Your Number"
Region	Date	Format	Label
Japan	March 11, 2015	CD; DVD	EMI; UMJ
Various	March 11, 2015	Digital download; streaming	EMI; UMJ
