= A Brand New Life (2009 film) =

- Theatrical release poster
- Hangul: 여행자
- Hanja: 旅行者
- RR: Yeohaengja
- MR: Yŏhaengja
- Directed by: Ounie Lecomte
- Written by: Ounie Lecomte
- Produced by: Lee Chang-dong; Laurent Lavole; Lee Joon-dong
- Starring: Kim Sae-ron; Park Do-yeon
- Cinematography: Kim Hyun-seok
- Edited by: Kim Hyung-joo
- Music by: Jim Sert
- Production companies: Now Film; Gloria Films
- Distributed by: Finecut; DCG Plus
- Release dates: May 20, 2009 (Cannes); October 29, 2009 (South Korea)
- Running time: 92 minutes
- Country: South Korea
- Language: Korean
- Box office: US$167,776

A Brand New Life (Korean: 여행자; RR: Yeohaengja) is a 2009 film and the debut feature of Ounie Lecomte, a Korean adoptee who grew up in France who directed and wrote the film. The film also marked the cinematic debut of actress Kim Sae-ron.

Loosely based on Lecomte's own experience, the movie is set in Seoul in 1975. A girl abandoned by her father at a Catholic orphanage struggles to adjust to a new life.

A Brand New Life was released in South Korea on October 29, 2009. The film grossed over US$167,776 and was well received by critics. It won several awards such as Best Asian Film at the 22nd Tokyo International Film Festival and the jury award at the 2009 Cinekid Festival in Amsterdam.

== Plot ==
Jin-hee (Kim Sae-ron), 9, is abandoned by her father at an orphanage run by Catholic nuns after remarrying. Before leaving her, he buys her new clothes and a cake to convince her that she is going on a trip. This coincides with the Korean title, which literally means "traveler" or "tourist". At the orphanage, she initially struggles to accept her abandonment by her father and insecurities about a possible adoption. She gradually makes friends, though she sticks to the belief that her father will return for her. She struggles, sometimes violently, to adjust to her surroundings and makes a failed attempt to run away from the orphanage. Eventually, she is adopted by a French couple. The movie's final scene is of her arrival at the airport in France to her "brand new life".

== Cast ==
- Kim Sae-ron as Jin-hee
- Park Do-yeon as Sook-hee
- Go Ah-sung as Ye-shin
- Park Myung-shin as a nanny
- Sul Kyung-gu as Jin-hee's father
- Oh Man-seok as Director Goo
- Shin Young-sik as Ye-shin's foster father
- Moon Sung-keun as a doctor
- Richard Wilson as puppeteer/U.S. soldier
- Rob Youngs as Sook-hee's adoptive father
- Luke Doyle as guitarist/U.S. soldier
- Harvey Schmidt as Jin-hee's adoptive father
