= The Queen's Classroom (2013 TV series) =

2013 South Korean TV series

- Promotional poster
- Also known as: Queen of the Classroom; Class of the Queen; Queen's Class
- Genre: Drama; Comedy; School
- Based on: Joō no Kyōshitsu by Kazuhiko Yukawa
- Written by: Kim Won-seok; Kim Eun-hee
- Directed by: Lee Dong-yoon
- Starring: Go Hyun-jung; Kim Hyang-gi; Chun Bo-geun; Kim Sae-ron; Seo Shin-ae
- Composer: Ji Pyeong-kwon
- Country of origin: South Korea
- Original language: Korean
- No. of episodes: 16

Production
- Executive producer: Kim Jin-min
- Producers: Jeon Seung-hoon; Park In-seon
- Cinematography: Kim Man-tae; Kim Hwa-young
- Editor: Im Gyeong-rae
- Production companies: MBC; IOK Media

Original release
- Network: MBC
- Release: June 12 – August 1, 2013

Related
- Joō no Kyōshitsu

The Queen's Classroom (Korean: 여왕의 교실; RR: Yeowangui gyosil) is a 2013 South Korean television series starring Go Hyun-jung. A remake of the popular Japanese drama of the same title (女王の教室, Joō no Kyōshitsu) that aired on NTV in 2005, it depicts a teacher whose rigid perfectionism and unique teaching methods conflicts with her young sixth grade students over the period of one school year.

It aired on MBC from June 12 to August 1, 2013 on Wednesdays and Thursdays at 21:55 for 16 episodes.

== Cast ==
=== Faculty at Sandeul Elementary School ===
- Go Hyun-jung as Ma Yeo-jin
- Youn Yuh-jung as Principal Yong Hyun-ja
- Lee Ki-young as Vice-Principal Song Young-man
- Jung Suk-young as Goo Ja-song
- Choi Yoon-young as Yang Min-hee
- Jin Kyung as Jung Hwa-shin
- Ricky Kim as Justin

=== Students of 6th Grade, Class 3 ===
- Kim Hyang-gi as Shim Ha-na
- Chun Bo-geun as Oh Dong-gu
- Kim Sae-ron as Kim Seo-hyun
- Seo Shin-ae as Eun Bo-mi
- Lee Young-yoo as Go Na-ri
- Chu Ye-jin as Han Sun-young
- Jung Ji-in as Seon Hwa-jung
- Byun Seung-mi as Hwang Soo-jin
- Jeon Park Yi-jin as Yoon Ji-min
- Yang Hye-kyung as Kim Ga-eul
- Kim Jung-yeon as Lee Da-in
- Kim Ji-hoon as Kim Tae-sung
- Kang Ji-won as Choi Bit-na
- Lee Ji-oh as Cha Jung-soo
- Son Sung-joon as Han Gook
- Kang Chan-hee as Kim Do-jin
- Shin Yi-joon as Pi Eun-soo
- Im Je-noh as Jung Sang-taek
- Park Woo-rim as Kwon Hyuk-pil
- Ryu Ui-hyun as Jo Yeon-hoo
- Kim Sang-woo as Park Kyung-hyun
- Yoon Hye-sung as Yoo Seok-hwan
- Kang Hyun-wook as Son In-bo

=== Parents' Association ===
- Byun Jung-soo as Na-ri's mother
- Lee Ah-hyun as Ha-na's mother
- Kim Young-pil as Ha-na's father

== Ratings ==
In the table below, the blue numbers represent the lowest ratings and the red numbers represent the highest ratings.

Ep.	Broadcast date	Average audience share			
Ep.	Broadcast date	TNmS		AGB Nielsen	
Ep.	Broadcast date	Nationwide	Seoul	Nationwide	Seoul
1	June 12, 2013	6.7%	7.5%	6.6%	7.6%
2	June 13, 2013	8.2%	9.2%	7.8%	9.2%
3	June 19, 2013	9.3%	10.9%	7.9%	9.2%
4	June 20, 2013	8.3%	10.3%	7.9%	9.2%
5	June 26, 2013	7.9%	10.2%	7.0%	8.2%
6	June 27, 2013	7.5%	9.1%	8.2%	9.6%
7	July 3, 2013	8.3%	9.9%	9.0%	10.1%
8	July 4, 2013	9.4%	11.2%	9.5%	10.9%
9	July 10, 2013	7.1%	8.7%	7.5%	8.4%
10	July 11, 2013	8.3%	10.1%	8.9%	10.7%
11	July 17, 2013	7.1%	8.7%	7.5%	8.9%
12	July 18, 2013	8.5%	10.1%	8.6%	9.3%
13	July 24, 2013	7.5%	9.7%	7.2%	7.9%
14	July 25, 2013	7.6%	9.3%	7.3%	8.0%
15	July 31, 2013	8.1%	9.7%	8.0%	8.9%
16	August 1, 2013	8.8%	10.2%	8.2%	9.2%
Average		8.0%	9.7%	7.9%	9.1%

== Original soundtrack ==
Album information	Track listing
	87번 여왕의 교실 OST
The Queen's Classroom OST: Released: August 19, 2013; Label: SM Entertainment, Riwei Media Com Networks, KMP Holdings	1. Green Rain - SHINee; 2. The 2nd Drawer - Sunny; 3. Maybe Tomorrow - RYEOWOOK; 4. I Will Be Yours - Inger Marie; 5. Amor Mío - Lee Hyori & Park Ji Yong (Honey- G); 6. Queen's Sonatina - Ji Pyung-Kwon; 7. Queen's Sonatina (Slow Version) - Ji Pyung-Kwon; 8. The 2nd Drawer (Orchestra Version) - Ji Pyung-; Kwon: 9. Slow Emotion - Kairos; 10. Euphoria - Ji Pyung-Kwon; 11. Bloomy Sunday - Yeom Seungjae; 12. Queen's Eyes - Ji Pyung-Kwon; 13. Classroom - Jeon Jonghyuk; 14. Raindrop - Ji Pyung-Kwon; 15. Stormy Passions - Ji Pyung-Kwon; 16. Ineffabilis - Lee Yoonjung; 17. Silhouette - Hong Dongpyo; 18. The Classroom Fear - Kim Yeonjin; 19. Wit Theme - Ji Pyung-Kwon; 20. Amore mio - Ji Pyung-Kwon; 21. Amore mio - Various artists

Chart Performance

Single	Released	Debut chart position	Artist
Single	Released	KOR	Artist
OST Part 1: "The 2nd Drawer"	June 13, 2013	107	Sunny (Girls' Generation)
OST Part 2: "Green Rain"	June 28, 2013	44	SHINee
OST Part 3: "I Will Be Yours"	July 11, 2013	—	Inger Marie
OST Part 4: "Maybe Tomorrow"	July 26, 2013	102	Ryeowook (Super Junior)

== Green Rain ==
"Green Rain"

Single by Shinee

from the album The Queen's Classroom Original Soundtrack
- B-side: "Green Rain" (Instrumental)
- Released: June 28, 2013
- Recorded: SM Studios in Seoul in 2013
- Genre: K-pop, R&B
- Length: 3:43
- Label: SM Entertainment, KT Music
- Composer: Kenzie
- Lyricist: Kenzie

Music video
- "Green Rain" on YouTube

"Green Rain" is a pop-R&B song performed by the South Korean boy group Shinee. The song and its instrumental version were released as a double-sided digital single on June 28, 2013 under the record labels of S.M. Entertainment and KT Music. "Green Rain" was the second soundtrack for the MBC TV drama series The Queen's Classroom to be unveiled, preceded by "The 2nd Drawer" from labelmate Sunny. It was also used as the ending theme-song for the series.

=== Production and release ===
The song is written, composed, directed and arranged by S.M. Entertainment's resident music producer, Kenzie. She also contributed the lyrics of the song. While the TV drama series started airing on June 12, 2013, the song was released as a digital single only after the fourth episode aired in South Korea. It was made available for music download on June 28, 2013.

=== Music video ===
The music video for "Green Rain" was released on July 16, 2013.

=== Track listing ===
Part 2 track listing
No.	Title	Lyrics	Music	Artist	Length
1.	"Green Rain" (초록비)	Kenzie	Kenzie	Shinee	3:43
2.	"Green Rain" (Instrumental)	—	Kenzie	—	3:43
Total length:					7:26

=== Chart performance ===
"Green Rain" was released as a digital single and debuted at the spot 49 of South Korea's Gaon Weekly Singles Chart.

Chart (2013)	Peak position
KOR Gaon Weekly singles	44
KOR Gaon Download Singles chart	33

== Awards and nominations ==
Year	Award	Category	Recipient	Result
2013	6th Korea Drama Awards	Grand Prize (Daesang)	Go Hyun-jung	Nominated
2013	6th Korea Drama Awards	Best Young Actor/Actress	Kim Hyang-gi	Nominated
2013	6th Korea Drama Awards	Best Young Actor/Actress	Kim Sae-ron	Nominated
2013	2nd APAN Star Awards	Best Young Actor	Chun Bo-geun	Won
2013	2nd APAN Star Awards	Best Young Actress	Kim Hyang-gi	Won
2013	MBC Drama Awards	Top Excellence Award, Actress in a Miniseries	Go Hyun-jung	Nominated
2013	MBC Drama Awards	Best Young Actor/Actress	Kim Hyang-gi; Kim Sae-ron; Seo Shin-ae; Chun Bo-geun; Lee Young-yoo	Won
2014	50th Baeksang Arts Awards	Most Popular Actress (TV)	Go Hyun-jung	Nominated
