= Ring Ding Dong =

Single by Shinee

from the EP 2009, Year of Us
- Language: Korean
- Released: October 14, 2009
- Recorded: 2009
- Studio: SM Booming System (Seoul)
- Genre: Afro-electric
- Length: 3:53
- Label: SM
- Composer: Yoo Young-jin
- Lyricist: Yoo Young-jin
- Producer: Yoo Young-jin

Shinee singles chronology
"Juliette" (2009)	"Ring Ding Dong" (2009)	"JoJo" (2009)

Music video
- "Ring Ding Dong" on YouTube

"Ring Ding Dong" is a song recorded by South Korean boy band Shinee as the lead single for their third extended play, 2009, Year of Us. It was released on October 14, 2009 through SM Entertainment. Penned by Yoo Young-jin, "Ring Ding Dong" is known for its repetitive, catchy hook.

== Background and release ==
"Ring Ding Dong" served as the lead single for Shinee's third EP, 2009, Year of Us. It was released on October 14, 2009, five days ahead of the EP's digital release. The music video was directed by Cho Soo-hyun and was shot in early October in Namyangju. It premiered on YouTube on October 16. Misha Gabriel, who had previously worked with the group on "Amigo", provided the choreography, alongside Nick Bass. Shinee began their promotions at KBS' Music Bank on October 16. On November 3, member Jonghyun was diagnosed with swine flu and had to take a break from promotions. Onew later contracted the disease on November 7, followed by Taemin on November 26. Super Junior's Yesung and Leeteuk filled in for the missing members in various performances.

== Composition ==
Written and produced by longtime SM songwriter Yoo Young-jin, "Ring Ding Dong" was a departure from Shinee's established contemporary R&B sound. Yoo later admitted, "they probably never imagined they’d receive a song in this style". "Ring Ding Dong" is an afro-electric song with a melody driven by African bongo drums and electro synths. The beat has been described as "tense and rubbery electro-house". It is "high-powered", "heavily produced" and "rhythmically dense". Sometimes characterised as "futuristic R&B", it also features "heavily auto-tuned vocals" and "Euro-pop production". The lyrics describe the process of falling in love with someone without realising. The refrain "ring ding dong", which is repeated throughout the song, cartoonishly expresses the moment of falling in love as though a bell is ringing in the head. Tom Breihan of Stereogum likened this to "nonsensical English baby-talk".

== Critical reception ==
"Ring Ding Dong" has received mixed reviews from music critics, with some believing that the song hasn't aged well. NME reporter Rhian Daly acknowledged that the song "might feel more of its time now than some of the rest of their songs", but nevertheless praised its "adventurous, experimental spirit". Likewise, writing for Dazed, Taylor Glasby described it as "unarguably a product of its musically outré time". She went on to add, "the melody's power to ingrain, however, hasn't dimmed". Tom Breihan of Stereogum viewed the song more positively, calling it "a pretty perfect introduction" to K-pop. He argued, "Nobody in Europe or America is using those Euro-club tropes better than the producers in Seoul are doing right now". It has been criticised for the repetitiveness of the lyrics.

"Ring Ding Dong" has gained a reputation for being so catchy, it distracts students from their studies. It has been voted the number one banned song by college entrance exam takers on several occasions. In 2020, the lyrics to "Ring Ding Dong" were featured in an exhibition at the National Hangeul Museum in Seoul titled "Korean Pop Lyrics – Melodies of Life".

== Commercial performance ==
"Ring Ding Dong" was a commercial success, topping various music charts in South Korea. It continued to chart for several months after its release, entering at number 85 on the inaugural edition of the Gaon Digital Chart, newly established in 2010. "Ring Ding Dong" was the most viewed video on YouTube in South Korea for the month of October 2009. It peaked at number 16 on Billboard World Digital Song Sales on the chart issue dated January 7, 2012, and stayed on the chart for nine weeks. As of December 2017, "Ring Ding Dong" has sold 38,000 downloads in the US, making it Shinee's second best-selling single in the country.

== Accolades ==
Awards and nominations for "Ring Ding Dong"
Ceremony	Year	Category	Result	Ref.
Cyworld Digital Music Awards	2009	Ting's Choice Artist (November)	Won	
Golden Disc Awards	2009	Digital Bonsang	Nominated	
Korean Music Awards	2010	Best Pop Song	Nominated	

Music program awards for "Ring Ding Dong"
Program	Date	Ref.
Music Bank	October 30, 2009	
Music Bank	November 6, 2009	
Inkigayo	November 1, 2009	
Inkigayo	November 8, 2009	
Inkigayo	November 15, 2009	
M Countdown	November 5, 2009	

== Credits and personnel ==
Credits adapted from the liner notes of 2009, Year of Us.

Recording

- Recorded, digitally edited and mixed at SM Booming System
- Mastered at Sonic Korea

Personnel

- Shinee – vocals, background vocals
- Yoo Young-jin – lyrics, composition, arrangement, vocal directing, background vocals, recording, mixing, digital editing
- Jeon Hoon – mastering

== Charts ==
Chart (2010)	Peak position
South Korea (Gaon)	85

== Release history ==
Release history and formats for "Ring Ding Dong"
Region	Date	Format	Label	Ref.
Various	October 14, 2009	Digital download; streaming	SM	
