= 3 2 1 (Shinee song) =

- Regular Edition Cover

Single by Shinee

from the album I'm Your Boy
- B-side: "Everybody" (Japanese version); "Colors of the Season"
- Released: December 4, 2013
- Recorded: 2013
- Genre: J-pop, pop rock
- Label: EMI Records Japan
- Songwriters: Natsumi Kobayashi, Damon Sharpe, Valeria Marbell, Eric Sanicola, Kendall Schmidt, Carlos Pena, James Maslow

Shinee Japanese singles chronology
"Boys Meet U" (2013)	"3 2 1" (2013)	"Lucky Star" (2014)

Music video
- "3 2 1" on YouTube

"3 2 1" is the ninth Japanese single by South Korean boy group Shinee. The single was released on December 4, 2013, by Universal Music Japan sublabel EMI Records Japan and is an OST for the Japanese drama Tokyo Toy Box.

== Background and release ==
On October 10, 2013 EMI Records Japan announced Shinee's ninth single, "3 2 1". On October 5, the song started playing as the theme song for the TV Tokyo drama Tokyo Toy Box. The short version of the music video was released on September 11, 2013.

According to the Japanese chart Oricon, Shinee sold 42,216 copies of their single on the first day of release. It landed them in third place on the chart.

== Track listing ==
Limited editions and CD only normal version:
No.	Title	Lyrics	Music	Length
1.	"3 2 1"	Natsumi Kobayashi	Damon Sharpe, Eric Sanicola, Kendall Schmidt, Carlos Pena, James Maslow	3:33
2.	"Everybody" (Japanese version)"	Sara Sakurai	Thomas Troelsen, Coach & Sendo, Yoo Young Jin	4:09
3.	"Colors of the Season"	Sara Sakurai	Andreas Stone Johansson, Caroline Gustavsson	4:29

CD only regular edition:
No.	Title	Length
4.	"3 2 1" (Instrumental)	3:33
5.	"Everybody (Japanese version)" (Instrumental)	4:09
6.	"Colors of the Season" (Instrumental)	4:29

DVD (Limited Edition A)
No.	Title	Length
1.	"Everybody" (Music Video)	4:38
2.	"Everybody" (Music Video Shooting Sketch)	7:54

DVD (Limited Edition B)
No.	Title	Length
1.	"3 2 1" (Music Video)	3:45
2.	"3 2 1" (Jacket & Music Video Shooting Sketch)	5:48

== Chart performance ==
=== Charts ===
Country	Chart	Peak position
Japan	Japan Hot 100 (Billboard)	2
Taiwan	G-Music Asia Chart	3
Taiwan	G-Music Combo Chart	20
Korea	Gaon Download Charts	168

=== Oricon chart ===
Chart (2013)	Peak position	Sales
Daily Singles Chart	3	82,236
Weekly Singles Chart	3	82,236
Monthly Singles Chart	7	82,236

== Release history ==
Country	Date	Format	Label
Japan	December 4, 2013	CD, Digital download	EMI Music Japan
South Korea	January 15, 2014	Digital download	SM Entertainment
