= Everybody (Shinee song) =

2013 single by Shinee

Single by Shinee

from the EP Everybody
- Released: October 14, 2013
- Genre: Complextro; dubstep
- Length: 4:07
- Label: SM
- Songwriters: Cho Yoon-kyung; Thomas Troelsen; Coach & Sendo; Yoo Young-jin
- Producers: Thomas Troelsen; Coach & Sendo

Shinee singles chronology
"Boys Meet U" (2013)	"Everybody" (2013)	"3 2 1" (2013)

Music video
- "Everybody" on YouTube

"Everybody" is a K-pop song of the complextro music genre performed by the South Korean boy group Shinee. Written by Cho Yoon-kyung, two versions of "Everybody" exist: the original Korean-language version, which served as the lead single for the group's fifth Korean EP Everybody (2013), and a Japanese-language version, which was one of the three tracks featured on their ninth Japanese single "3 2 1" (2013). The Korean version of "Everybody" was made available for download on October 14, 2013, under the record label of SM Entertainment.

== Composition ==
"Everybody" was composed by Thomas Troelsen, who had worked on prior Shinee tracks "Sherlock (Clue + Note)" (2012) and "Love Like Oxygen" (2008), and Coach & Sendo, enlisted for their beat-making expertise. The lyrics were penned by Cho Yoon-kyung, who also wrote "Sherlock (Clue + Note)". It is a complextro song with a "funky" rhythm and dubstep elements. Writing for Billboard, Jeff Benjamin described it as an "easy-to-digest electro-pop track", incorporating "bleeps, bloops, build-ups and breakdowns" overlaid by "sweet boy band harmonies". The lyrics are inspired by the Pied Piper; Shinee coaxes the listener to allow the music to take them away from the harsh realities of adult life to the world of their childhood.

== Music video ==
The music video was released on October 10, 2013. It was directed by Jang Jae-hyuk and filmed on a set in Ilsan at the end of September. Jang stated that various techniques and equipment like the steadicam, technocrane and camera matrix were used to film the music video. The choreography of the song was created by Tony Testa, who had previously collaborated with the group on "Sherlock (Clue + Note)" and "Dream Girl" (2013), assisted by Hwang Sang-hoon, SM Entertainment's performance director. Testa said he was "continually amending the dance because the track went through so many changes", and took inspiration from the action figures he used to play with as a child. The video depicts Shinee as toy soldiers, with Minho "winding up" the other members. The group wore military uniforms designed by Thom Browne.

== Critical reception ==
Billboard K-Town columnist Jeff Benjamin wrote "while finding a delicous balance of hyperactive EDM and pop stylings is commendable, the most impressive point of Shinee's "Everybody" comeback is the choreography – some of 2013's best".

== Live performances ==
The first live performance of "Everybody" was included in the set-list of the Shinee Comeback Special at the Gangnam Hallyu Festival on October 6, 2013, in Samseong-dong, Seoul. The performances were streamed on SM Town's YouTube channel. The first broadcast live performance, however, was through Mnet's music show M Countdown on October 10, 2013. This was followed by performances at KBS Music Bank on October 11, MBC Show! Music Core on October 12, SBS Inkigayo on October 13, and MBC Music Show Champion on October 16, 2013.

== Japanese version ==
The Japanese version was included as one of the three tracks on their ninth Japanese single "3 2 1", which was released on December 4, 2013, under the distributing label of Universal Music Japan.

== Accolades ==
Music program awards
Program	Date	Ref.
Show Champion	October 23, 2013	
Show Champion	October 30, 2013	
Music Bank	October 25, 2013	
Show! Music Core	October 26, 2013	
Inkigayo	October 27, 2013	
M Countdown	October 31, 2013	

== Chart performance ==
Weekly chart performance for "Everybody"
Chart (2013)	Peak position
South Korea (Gaon)	1
South Korea (K-pop Hot 100)	15
US World Digital Song Sales (Billboard)	3
