= Kang Tae-joo =

South Korean actor (born 1995)

- 강태주
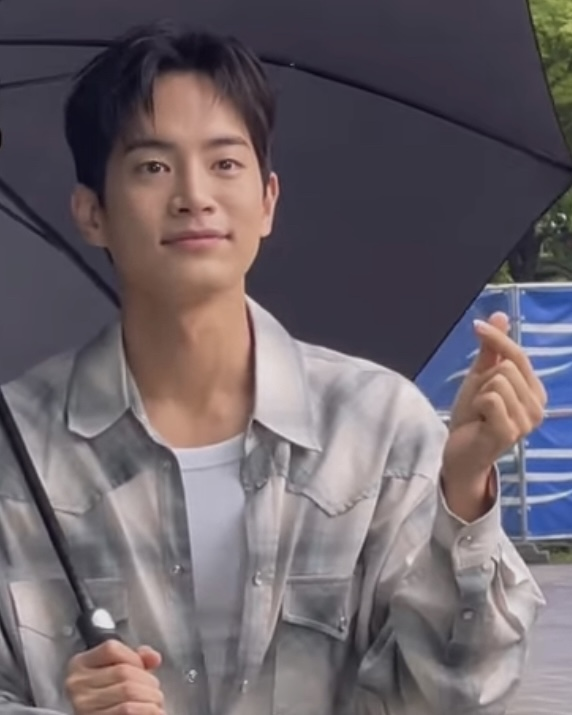
- Kang in 2023
- Born: May 19, 1995 (age 31); South Korea
- Education: Kwangwoon University Faculty of Media (Bachelor Degree)
- Occupations: Actor; model
- Years active: 2018–present
- Agent: Andmarq

Korean name
- Hangul: 강태주
- RR: Gang Taeju
- MR: Kang T'aeju
- Website: andmarq.com/artist?=Kang-Tae-Ju

Kang Tae-joo (Korean: 강태주, born on May 19, 1995) is a South Korean actor and model. His notable role was a Kopino boxer name Marco in Park Hoon-jung noir film The Childe (2023), which led him receiving Best New Actor Award from 2023 Golden Cinematography Awards.

Starting as an advertising model, Kang is known for supporting role television drama series Missing: The Other Side (2020), Hello, Me! (2021), and season 2 of Pachinko (2024).

== Career ==
Kang studied in Department of Media and Visual Arts of Kwangwoon University. He debuted as an advertising model in 2018, and in 2019, he made his acting debut in the lead role in the web drama Today's Peaceful Secondhand Country. Around the same time, Kang signed an exclusive contract with his agency, UL Entertainment. However, the drama was not released immediately and was instead released in 2021 as a Naver TV web drama. Today's Peaceful Secondhand Country is a realistic youth romance set on a second-hand trading site, written by screenwriter Choi Soo-young and directed by Kim Jae-hong. Kang played the role of Yoo Eun-ho.

So, in the public eye, Kang's debut was in 2020 when he made his television debut in season one of the OCN drama series Missing: The Other Side. Kang played the role of Kang Dae-sung, a public service worker at the community center where Jong-ah (Ahn So-hee) was working. However, he was also an idol trainee and a part-timer at Jong-ah's pawn shop. His performance as a curious and witty personality sparked growing curiosity about the rookie actor Kang.

In 2021, Kang played Min Kyung-sik in comedy-mystery Hello, Me! Min Kyung-sik serves as the sole manager for Anthony (Eum Moon-seok). Kang's performance has been received positively by viewers due to his excellent rapport with Park Jung-man (Choi Dae-cheol), the agency CEO. Despite Anthony's tyrannical behavior, Min consistently exuded a positive energy and brought levity with his comedic performances.

In the same year, Kang was selected for the main role of Marco in Park Hoon-jung's film The Childe, after facing tough competition with a rate of 1:1980. Kang went through three rounds of auditions and was ultimately chosen due to his impressive performances. He worked tirelessly to perfect his English lines. Despite having a slim physique, Marco is a boxer in illegal boxing matches. Kang underwent intense training with national-level athletes to prepare for the role, focusing on developing lean muscles and undergoing a physical transformation. The process helped create a convincing portrayal of Marco as a boxer. He even performed most of the action scenes himself, without stunt doubles.

Kang appears alongside Kim Seon-ho, Kim Kang-woo, and Go Ara. Principal photography of the film began on December 10, 2021. His debut film The Childe was released in South Korea on June 21, 2023. Role Marco led to him receiving Best New Actor Award from Golden Cinema Film Festival.

In season 2 of Pachinko, Kang appears as Noa, the eldest son of Seon-ja (Kim Min-ha).

== Filmography ==
=== Film ===
Feature film appearancesFeature film appearances
Year	Title		Role	Ref.
Year	English	Korean	Role	Ref.
2023	The Childe	귀공자	Marco Han	

=== Television ===
Television appearances
Year	Title		Role	Notes	Ref.
Year	English	Korean	Role	Notes	Ref.
2020	Missing: The Other Side	미씽: 그들이 있었다	Kang Dae-sung	Supporting role (OCN Drama)	
2021	Hello, Me!	안녕? 나야!	Min Kyung-sik	Supporting role (KBS Drama)	

=== Web series ===
Feature film appearancesFeature film appearances
Year	Title		Role	Notes	Ref.
Year	English	Korean	Role	Notes	Ref.
2021	Today's Peaceful Secondhand Country	오늘도 평화로운 중고나라	Yoo Eun-ho	Naver TV web drama	
2023	Pachinko 2	파친코	Noa Baek	Apple TV Original Series	

== Accolades ==
=== Awards and nominations ===
Awards and nominations
Award ceremony	Year	Category	Nominee / Work	Result	Ref.
Blue Dragon Film Awards	2023	Best New Actor	The Childe	Nominated	
Blue Dragon Film Awards	2023	Chung Jung-won Popular Star Award	The Childe	Nominated	
Buil Film Awards	2023	Popular Star Award	The Childe	Nominated	
Golden Cinematography Awards	2023	Best New Actor	The Childe	Won	

=== Listicles ===
Name of publisher, year listed, name of listicle, and placement
Publisher	Year	Listicle	Placement	Ref.
Joy News 24	2023	Rising Star Film Actor of the year	5th (Note: Tied for 5th place with 6 votes each with Do Kyung-soo, Kim Seon-ho and Lee Shin-young.)	
