= The Childe =

2023 South Korean film

- Theatrical release poster
- Hangul: 귀공자
- Hanja: 貴公子
- Lit.: Scion
- RR: Gwigongja
- MR: Kwigongja
- Directed by: Park Hoon-jung
- Written by: Park Hoon-jung
- Produced by: Park Hoon-jung; Jang Kyung-ik
- Starring: Kim Seon-ho; Kang Tae-joo; Kim Kang-woo; Go Ara
- Cinematography: Kim Hong-mok; Shin Tae-ho; Lee Tae-oh
- Edited by: Jang Lae-won
- Music by: Mowg
- Production companies: Sageumwol Film (Goldmoon Film); Studio&NEW
- Distributed by: Next Entertainment World
- Release date: June 21, 2023
- Running time: 118 minutes
- Country: South Korea
- Language: Korean
- Box office: US$6 million

The Childe (Korean: 귀공자; RR: Gwigongja; lit. 'Nobleman') is a 2023 South Korean neo-noir action thriller film directed by Park Hoon-jung, starring Kim Seon-ho and Kang Tae-joo in his film debut and also Kim Kang-woo, and Go Ara. It was released theatrically on June 21, 2023.

== Synopsis ==
Marco resides in the Philippines, caring for his sick mother, while also participating in fights within illegal stadiums in the country. With a complex heritage as the offspring of a Korean father and a Filipino mother, Marco has tirelessly sought his estranged father's whereabouts. His sole motivation is to secure funds for his mother's crucial surgery, yet his relentless pursuit has yielded no results. Following a harrowing encounter with a gang that ultimately lands him in the hospital, a lawyer suddenly emerges, claiming to represent his long-lost father. Seizing the opportunity, they hastily embark on a journey to South Korea that very night. However, during the flight, Marco finds himself in an unsettling encounter with a mysterious individual who possesses an uncanny knowledge beyond what initially meets the eye.

Upon Marco's arrival in South Korea, he is immediately ambushed by an unnamed assassin known only as "Nobleman," the very same individual he had an unsettling encounter with on the plane. He soon discovers that he is being relentlessly pursued by a dangerous group of individuals. Alongside the Nobleman, Marco finds himself a target of Han Yi-sa, a wealthy heir with intentions of claiming his father's vast fortune, and Yoon-ju, a mysterious woman with whom Marco unexpectedly reunites in South Korea. Caught in a whirlwind of unpredictability and madness, Marco becomes entangled in a web of uncertainty. Amidst this chaotic scenario, he is compelled to confront a shocking truth that will shatter everything he once believed about his past and present.

In the end, Marco finds out who was his real foe and who was his real ally and the Nobleman reveals the reasons behind his erratic behaviour and shocking decisions.

== Cast ==
- Kim Seon-ho as Nobleman (Gwigongja), an unidentified pursuer who turns Marco's surroundings into a mess.
- Kang Tae-joo as Marco Han, a Kopino boxer.
- Kim Kang-woo as Han Yi-sa, a second-generation conglomerate client.
- Go Ara as Yoon-ju, a mysterious woman.
- Lee Ki-young as Kim Seon-saeng, a man who runs a center for Kopino.
- Heo Joon-seok as Andrew Kang (Kang Woon-seok), Han Yi-sa's lawyer
- Justin John Harvey as a western man who gives Marco an offer he can't refuse.
- Jeong Ra-el as Han Ga-young, Yi-sa's younger sister.
- Choi Jung-woo as Chairman Han
- Caroline Magbojos as Marco's Mother
- Kim Ho-jun as bodyguard

== Production ==
=== Casting ===
It was reported in September 2021 that Kim Seon-ho was positively considering to join the film. On November 19, 2021, the casting of Kim, Seon-ho, Kim Kang-woo, Go A-ra and Kang Tae-joo was confirmed. Rookie actor Kang Tae-joo was cast to play Marco with audition ratio 1:1,980.

=== Filming ===
The first script reading was held on December 3, 2021 and filming began on December 10, 2021. The film's shooting location were in Jangseong, Gokseong, Jeju Island, and overseas. Kim Seon-ho departed for Thailand on March 31, 2022, for the shooting of the film.

== Release ==
=== Domestic release ===
Originally titled Sad Tropic (Korean: 슬픈 열대; RR: Seulpeun yeoldae) on November 30, 2022, the movie distributor Next Entertainment World announced the new title as The Childe and shared that the featured film was planned to be released in 2023. On May 16, 2023, it was reported that the film will be released theatrically on June 21, 2023, in South Korea.

=== International release ===
On May 16, 2023, it was reported that the film The Childe will be released theatrically on June 21, 2023, in Taiwan, on July 5 in the Philippines, and on July 27 in Thailand.

On May 17, 2023 Screendaily reported that The Childe was sold to several international distributors, including Well Go USA (North America), MovieCloud (Taiwan), Sahamongkolfilm International (Thailand), Laon Company+ (the Philippines), Encore Inflight, and Clover Films (Singapore, Malaysia, Brunei, Indonesia, East Timor, Hong Kong, and Macau). The film was also released in India on August 4. In North America, The Childe was released on June 30, 2023.

The Japanese release of the film, titled "Kikoushi," took place on April 12, 2024. On April 8, Kim Seon-ho made a surprise appearance at the Japan premiere, joining Korean culture journalist Masayuki Furuya for a stage greeting attended by around 600 people. Furthermore, an exhibition showcasing Kim's film costumes were held at Marunouchi Piccadilly in Shinjuku, Tokyo, and Namba Parks Cinema, Osaka. The exhibition begin on April 12 to coincide with the theatrical release of the film, which also started on the same day. It will also be screened at the 36th Fukuoka Asian Film Festival on September 7 to 8, 2024. The Childe had theatrical releases in Spain, titled "El Bastardo," scheduled for February 23, 2024.

=== Film festivals' release ===
The Childe was featured in film festivals across North America, Europe, and Asia, beginning in the summer of 2023. In North America, the film premiered at the 2023 Dallas Asian Film Festival on July 14, 2023. The Childe had its Canadian premiere on August 2, 2023, at the 27th Fantasia International Film Festival. Additionally, Eckerd College screened The Childe as part of The International Cinema Series on September 29, 2023, in Florida. It was also featured as part of the line-up of the Asian Pop-Up Cinema (APUC) Season 17on October 6, 2023, at AMC Newcity 14 in Chicago.

The film had joined several European film festivals, with its European premiere on September 5, 2023, at the Forum des Images as the opening film for L'Étrange Festival - XXIXème édition in Paris, France. The film's selection was announced on August 21, 2023, and it also participated in the festival's International Competition for the New Genre Grand Prize and the Audience Award. Concurrently, it was featured in the lineup of Asian films at the 17th Lisbon International Horror Film Festival, which ran from September 5 to 11, 2023, in Portugal.

The film's journey continued in Spain, with the announcement of its invitation to the Òrbita section of the 56th Sitges Film Festival on August 9, 2023. The festival took place from October 5 to 15, 2023 in Sitges, Catalonia, Spain. Later that month, it was included in the 12th Korean Film Festival in Frankfurt, Germany, which took place from October 25 to 29, 2023. In November 2023, The Childe was screened at several film festivals in Spain. It was shown at the Canary Islands Ciudad de La Laguna Calavera Island Fantastic Film Festival from November 10 to 19, at the 33rd Fantastic Film Festival of the University of Málaga, also known as Fancine Málaga, at Cine Albéniz in Málaga, Spain, on November 11 and 14. The film's Spanish run concluded with a screening on November 24 at the 7th Maniatic Film Festival.

The film was also part of the lineup for the Korean Horizons segment at the 22nd Florence Korea Film Festival in Firenze, Italy, which ran from March 21 to 30, 2024. Its specific screening date was March 22, 2024, at Cinema La Compagnia.

The Childe also took part in Asian film festivals. It was part of the "Korea Indonesia Film Festival" (KIFF), a selection of 16 films from South Korea and Indonesia, which was held from October 20 to 22, 2023, across CGV Cinemas Indonesia in four cities in Indonesia: Jakarta, Bandung, Yogyakarta, and Surabaya. The film was also featured in the "2023 ASEAN-Korea Film Festival," which ran from November 27 to 30, 2023, at CGV Mall Pacific Place in Jakarta, showcasing a lineup of nine films from Indonesia, Vietnam, Thailand, and South Korea. The Childe was screened on November 28.

The film's festival journey also extended to Latin America. On August 16, 2025, it was screened as part of the Non-Competitive Showcase at the Korean Film Festival (KOFF). KOFG is a showcase for acclaimed South Korean films and independent productions, featuring both feature and short films in various Brazilian cities. The festival's programming includes a Non-Competitive Showcase of 20 South Korean films, a Competitive Showcase, and international debates.

=== Home media ===
The Childe launched a simultaneous VOD service for IPTV and theaters on July 18, 2023, through various platforms such as IPTV (Genie TV, SK Btv, LG U+TV), Home Choice, Google Play, Wavve, Naver Series on, KT skylife, and Cine Fox.

In February 2024, The Childe premiered on terrestrial TV on SBS channel as part of the 2024 Lunar New Year holiday special film. It aired at 22:30 p.m. KST on Saturday, February 10. The movie ranked 8th in the Nielsen TOP 20 household viewership ratings with a 4.3% rating and 5th in the TOP 20 Viewers Nationwide with 910,000 viewers. As part of its special movies programming, cable channel OCN broadcast The Childe on Saturday, February 11, at 10:00 p.m. On Tuesday, March 26, 2024, at 10:20 p.m., SBS channel aired a re-run of The Childe. The movie ranked 15th in the Nielsen TOP 20 household viewership ratings with a 3.4% rating and 18th in the TOP 20 Viewers Nationwide with 345,000 viewers.

On March 20, 2026, The Childe was released on Netflix Korea. It quickly entered the top five of the domestic viewing rankings and is recording a box office rebound with the audience rating of 7.65 (based on Naver Films), receiving positive reviews in terms of genre perfection and harmony of action and black comedy. In particular, Kim Seonho's specific sequence is referred to as the representative scene of the work. As of March 30, 2026, The Childe reached the third rank on the domestic movie ranking.

== Reception ==
Professional ratings
Aggregate scores
Source	Rating
Rotten Tomatoes	94%
Review scores
Source	Rating
South China Morning Post	3/5 stars
The Straits Times	3/5 stars

On the review aggregation website Rotten Tomatoes, the film has an approval rating of 94% based on reviews from 16 critics.

Peter Marsh of the South China Morning Post gave The Childe three out of five rating, said that, "K-drama heartthrob Kim Seon-ho steals the show... injecting his well-groomed assassin with a refreshing dose of self-effacing irreverence... Like a shotgun-toting episode of Succession, The Childe escalates into a greed-fuelled bloodbath." John Lui from The Straits Times gave The Childe three out of five rating, said that, "It is bloody – take note of the NC16 rating – but the scenes are efficient." Cary Darling of Houston Chronicle stated that, "This twisty thriller...is what might happen if Quentin Tarantino, with a bit of an assist from John Woo, Park Chan-wook's Old Boy and the spirit of Alfred Hitchcock, had directed an episode of Succession."

Newsen reported on audience reviews, with actual audience members expressing their thoughts such as, "Exciting chase action, unpredictable story, and a feast of attractive characters." Other viewers mentioned, "2 hours without a dull moment," and another viewer highlighted, "Director Park Hoon-jung's action, a touch of black comedy, and a new frontier in noir." It is worth noting that "The Childe" is the only film among the top 10 box office hits that is not accessible to young audiences (R-Rated). Despite this restriction, the film has maintained high rankings in both box office revenue and reservation rates. As of August 25, 2023, the film has continued to hold its place among the Top Ten Korean Commercial Films of 2023, according to the Kobiz Database.

On July 11, 2023, CBI Pictures announced that The Childe had become the second-highest-grossing South Korean film in Indonesia.

== Accolades ==
=== Awards and nominations ===
Name of the award ceremony, year presented, category, nominee of the award, and the result of the nomination
Award ceremony	Year	Category	Nominee / Work	Result	Ref.
Baeksang Arts Awards	2024	Best New Actor	Kim Seon-ho	Nominated	
Blue Dragon Film Awards	2023	Best New Actor	Kim Seon-ho	Nominated	
Blue Dragon Film Awards	2023	Best New Actor	Kang Tae-joo	Nominated	
Buil Film Awards	2023	Best New Actor	Kim Seon-ho	Won	
Buil Film Awards	2023	Popular Star Award	Kim Seon-ho	Nominated	
Buil Film Awards	2023	Popular Star Award	Kim Kang-woo	Nominated	
Buil Film Awards	2023	Popular Star Award	Kang Tae-joo	Nominated	
Buil Film Awards	2023	Popular Star Award	Go Ara	Nominated	
7th Canary Islands Fantastic Film Festival (Note: Ciudad de La Laguna, Isla Calavera)	2023	Best feature film in the Official Section to Competition	The Childe	Nominated	
Festival Film Bandung	2023	Best Imported Film	The Childe	Top 10	
Festival Film Bandung	2023	Best Imported Action-Comedy Film (Note: Sub-category of Best Imported Film)	The Childe	Won	
Grand Bell Awards	2023	Best New Actor	Kim Seon-ho	Won	
43rd Golden Cinematography Awards	2023	Best Film	The Childe	Nominated	
43rd Golden Cinematography Awards	2023	Best New Actor	Kang Tae-joo	Won	
Sitges Film Festival	2023	Best feature film in the Òrbita section	The Childe	Nominated	

=== Listicles ===
End of year top lists
Publisher	Year	Listicle	Placement	Ref.
Asian Movie Pulse	2023	The 20 Best Korean Movies of 2023	11th	
GQ India	2023	10 enthralling Korean thriller movies on Amazon Prime Video that will blow your mind	Top 10	
