= Golden Cinematography Awards =

Film awards presented by the Korean Society of Cinematographers

- Hangul: 황금촬영상영화제
- RR: Hwanggeum chwaryeong sangyeonghwaje
- MR: Hwanggŭm ch'waryŏng sangyŏnghwaje
- Awarded for: Excellence in film (Cinematography)
- Country: South Korea
- Hosted by: Korean Society of Cinematographers (KSC)
- Established: 1977
- First award: 1977

Highlights
- Most wins: Seo Jeong-min (7 Awards)

The Golden Cinematography Awards (Korean: 황금촬영상영화제) are presented by the Korean Society of Cinematographers (KSC). The awards recognize works filmed by KSC members over the past year, with all members collectively evaluating submitted films to select recipients for new technical achievements. It has been promoted to one of the top three film award ceremonies in Korea along with the Blue Dragon Film Awards and the Baeksang Arts Awards.

The judging panel consists of KSC members recommended by the entire membership. Judging criteria are divided into creativity, technicality, and artistry, with awards given for Gold, Silver, and Bronze Cinematography, as well as New Cinematographer Award, Grand Prize, Best Film, Best Director, Best Actor/Actress, Best Supporting Actor/Actress, New Director Award, New Actor Award, and Popular Actor Award. As these awards are chosen by cinematographers, they focus on the novelty of filming techniques and their impact on technical development.

== Winners by Category ==
Referenced by:

=== Best Picture ===
Year	Edition	Winner
2006	29	The King and the Clown
2008	31	Happiness
2009	32	Lift the King Kong
2011	33	The Yellow Sea
2014	34	Miracle in Cell No. 7
2015	35	Ode to My Father
2016	36	The Tiger
2017	37	The Age of Shadows
2018	38	1987: When the Day Comes
2019	39	The Spy Gone North
2020	40	Parasite
2021	41	The Book of Fish
2022	42	Kingmaker
2023	43	The Night Owl
2024	44	Exhuma
2025	45	The Match

=== Cinematographer Award ===
Cinematography Award Winners
Year	Edition	Category	Winner	Work(s)
1977	1	Gold	Paeng Jung-mun	Jealousy
1977	1	Silver	Gu Jung-mo	Villains, Take the Express Train to Hell
1977	1	Bronze	Seo Jeong-min	First Love
1978	2	Gold	Seo Jeong-min	The Last Day of Dosolsan
1978	2	Silver	Jung Woon-gyo	Laughter
1978	2	Bronze	Son Hyun-chae	Policeman
1979	3	Gold	Jeon Jo-myeong	A Near and Distant Road
1979	3	Silver	Lee Seong-chun	Sudden Shower
1979	3	Bronze	Lee Seok-ki	Tomorrow and Tomorrow
1980	4	Gold	Lee Seok-ki	That Man Then
1980	4	Silver	Yu Young-gil	Monsoon
1980	4	Bronze	Jeon Jo-myeong	A Woman of Color
1981	5	Gold	Son Hyun-chae	The Hut
1981	5	Silver	Lee Seok-ki	The Woman Who Laughed Three Times
1981	5	Bronze	Paeng Jung-mun	Run Balloon
1982	6	Gold	Seo Jeong-min	They Shot the Sun
1982	6	Silver	Lee Seong-chun	The Fixer
1982	6	Bronze	Jeon Jo-myeong	Girl Who Went to the City
1983	7	Gold	Gu Jung-mo	Jealousy
1983	7	Silver	Lee Seong-seop	Nameless Woman
1983	7	Bronze	Paeng Jung-mun	Applause
1983	7	Bronze	Park Seong-deok	Madam Rose
1984	8	Gold	Lee Seok-ki	Madam Aema
1984	8	Silver	Jung Gwang-seok	Flower of the Equator
1984	8	Bronze	Seo Jeong-min	Declaration of Fools
1984	8	Bronze	Jung Il-man	So-Hwa-Seong Undertaker
1985	9	Gold	Yu Young-gil	Memory's Light
1985	9	Silver	Jin Young-ho	Moonlight Melody
1985	9	Bronze	Ahn Tae-wan	Blue Sky Galaxy
1986	10	Gold	Gu Jung-mo	Riding the Elevator
1986	10	Silver	Jeon Jo-myeong	Into the Night's Heat
1986	10	Bronze	Hong Dong-hyuk	No Way, It Kills People
1986	10	Bronze	Jung Woon-gyo	A Woman Gambles Once
1987	11	Gold	Jung Gwang-seok	Long Journey, Long Tunnel
1987	11	Silver	Park Seung-bae	Moonlight Hunter
1987	11	Bronze	Shin Ok-hyun	Hero's Lament
1987	11	Bronze	Lee Seong-seop	Dolswe Wind
1988	12	Gold	Yu Young-gil	Hello, God
1988	12	Silver	Gu Jung-mo	Blue Heart
1988	12	Bronze	Park Seung-bae	Y's Experience
1989	13	Gold	—N/a	
1989	13	Silver	Paeng Jung-mun	Curiosity of a Wolf Stole a Dove
1989	13	Bronze	Shin Ok-hyun	Sweet Brides
1989	13	Bronze	Jin Young-ho	Hollyhock Blossoms for You
1990	14	Gold	Yang Young-gil	A Sketch on a Rainy Day
1990	14	Silver	—N/a	
1990	14	Bronze	Jin Young-ho	Red Actress
1991	15	Gold	Yu Young-gil	My Love, My Bride
1991	15	Silver	—N/a	
1991	15	Bronze	Choi Chan-kyu	She Doesn't Live Here Anymore
1992	16	Gold	Jin Young-ho	Tears of Seoul
1992	16	Silver	Choi Jung-won	Milk Chocolate
1992	16	Bronze	Jung Pil-si	From Seom River to Sky
1993	17	Gold	Jung Gwang-seok	Blue in You
1993	17	Silver	Shin Ok-hyun	Mister Mamma
1993	17	Bronze	Park Seong-deok	Continent of Ambition
1994	18	Gold	Seo Jeong-min	Absolute Love
1994	18	Silver	Park Seung-bae	Our Twisted Hero
1994	18	Bronze	Lee Dong-sam	Love is Pro, Marriage is Amateur
1996	19	Gold	Jung Gwang-seok	Runaway
1996	19	Silver	Shin Ok-hyun	The Terrorist
1996	19	Bronze	Park Kyung-won	Daddy is a Bodyguard
1997	20	Gold	Seo Jeong-min	Pianoman
1997	20	Silver	Yu Young-gil	Green Fish
1997	20	Bronze	Jeon Jo-myeong	Firebird
1998	21	Gold	Lee Dong-sam	The Trap
1998	21	Silver	Park Seung-bae	No. 3
1998	21	Bronze	Park Kyung-won	The Letter
1999	22	Gold	Jeon Jo-myeong	The Promise
1999	22	Silver	Kim Seong-bok	Shiri
1999	22	Bronze	Kim Hyeong-gu	City of the Rising Sun
2000	23	Gold	Song Haeng-gi	Nowhere to Hide
2000	23	Silver	Choi Jeong-woo	Attack the Gas Station!
2000	23	Bronze	Lee Seok-hyun	The Spy Ri Chul-jin
2001	24	Gold	Seo Jeong-min	Libera Me
2001	24	Silver	Moon Yong-sik	Secret
2001	24	Bronze	Byeon Hee-seong	Bichunmo
2002	25	Gold	Kim Hyeong-gu	Musa
2002	25	Silver	Lee Seok-hyun	The Gift
2002	25	Bronze	Park Hee-joo	Besa Me Mucho
2003	26	Gold	Moon Yong-sik	Phone
2003	26	Silver	Jung Han-cheol	Yesterday
2003	26	Bronze	Choi Chan-kyu	The Way to My Daughter
2004	27	Gold	Byeon Hee-seong	Wild Card
2004	27	Silver	Choi Ji-yeol	Butterfly
2004	27	Bronze	Kim Seong-bok	Silmido
2005	28	Gold	Kim Hyeong-gu	Rikidozan
2005	28	Silver	Lee Joon-gyu	Arahan
2005	28	Bronze	Seok Hyeong-jin	R-Point
2006	29	Gold	Ji Gil-ung	The King and the Clown
2006	29	Silver	Park Sang-hoon	Love
2006	29	Bronze	Jin Young-hwan	Mr. Socrates
2007	30	Gold	Park Hyun-cheol	200 Pounds Beauty
2007	30	Silver	Oh Hyun-je	Bloody Tie
2007	30	Bronze	Kim Young-ho	Jungcheon
2008	31	Gold	Kim Hyeong-gu	Happiness
2008	31	Silver	Moon Yong-sik	Once Upon a Time
2008	31	Bronze	Shin Ok-hyun	Open City
2009	32	Gold	Byeon Hee-seong	The Divine Weapon
2009	32	Silver	Hong Kyung-pyo	Mother
2009	32	Bronze	Jung Han-cheol	Missing
2011	33	Gold	Lee Tae-yoon	The Man from Nowhere
2011	33	Silver	Kim Woo-hyung	No Mercy
2011	33	Bronze	Kim Ki-tae	The Full Story of Kim Bok-nam Murder Case
2014	34	Gold	Oh Hyun-je	Gabi
2014	34	Silver	Kim Ki-tae	Confession of Murder
2014	34	Bronze	Choi Sang-mook	Uninvited Guest
2015	35	Gold	Hong Kyung-pyo	Haemoo
2015	35	Silver	Jung Han-cheol	Thorn
2015	35	Bronze	Kim Hyun-seok	A Girl at My Door
2016	36	Gold	Choi Young-hwan	Veteran
2016	36	Silver	Choi Sang-ho	Missing You
2016	36	Bronze	Choi Yong-jin	Dongju: The Portrait of a Poet
2017	37	Gold	Kim Ki-tae	Because I Love You
2017	37	Silver	Choi Chan-kyu	A Quiet Dream
2017	37	Bronze	Kim Byung-jung	Alone
2018	38	Gold	Kim Tae-seong	Keys to the Heart
2018	38	Silver	Yoon Hong-sik	Sermon on the Mount
2018	38	Bronze	Jung Jae-seung	Original Sin
2019	39	Gold	Park Yong-soo	Uhm Bok-dong
2019	39	Silver	Choi Chan-min	The Spy Gone North
2019	39	Bronze	Seo Ki-won	Eomung
2020	40	Gold	Hong Kyung-pyo	Parasite
2020	40	Silver	Kim Tae-kyung	The King's Letters
2020	40	Bronze	Kim Hak-soo	Again, Spring
2021	41	Gold	Lee Eui-tae	The Book of Fish
2021	41	Silver	Kim Byung-jung	Beyond the Mountain
2021	41	Bronze	Son Won-ho	The Swordsman
2022	42	Gold	Kim Tae-seong	Hansan: Rising Dragon
2022	42	Silver	Kim Yoon-soo	Lady of the Rings
2022	42	Bronze	Choi Se-il	Spiritwalker
2023	43	Gold	Kim Tae-kyung	The Night Owl
2023	43	Silver	Jo Sang-yoon	Hero
2023	43	Bronze	Kim Jeong-ho	Gada
2024	44	Gold	—N/a	
2024	44	Silver	—N/a	
2024	44	Bronze	Kim Dong-cheon	Secret

=== New Cinematographer Award ===
Year	Edition	Winner	Film
1982	6	Jung Pil-si	Friend, Go Quietly
1989	13	Choi Chan-kyu	City of Mist
1990	14	Gu Kyo-han	Prostitution
1991	15	Heo Eung-hee	Cheongsanggye
1992	16	Lee Dong-sam	Lover Who Came on a Bicycle
1993	17	Han Deok-jin	Guardian of the Mind
1994	18	Kim Jin-cheol	Some Stories I Know About Sex
1996	19	Lee Eun-gil	301, 302
1997	20	Lee Hee-joo	Mister Condom
1998	21	Lee Seok-hyun	Blackjack
1999	22	Kim Young-cheol	An Affair
2000	23	Lee Hu-gon	The End of the Century
2002	25	Lee Ki-tae	Leaf
2003	26	Shin Hyung-joong	Are You Ready?
2003	26	Choi Ji-yeol	Blue
2004	27	Ji Gil-ung	Once Upon a Time in a Battlefield
2005	28	Park Sang-hoon	Twisted Kick
2005	28	Kim Dong-cheon	Bunshinsaba
2005	28	Kim Hyo-jin	Liar
2006	29	Choi Sang-ho	Welcome to Dongmakgol
2007	30	Seong Jong-mu	Time
2008	31	Kim Hak-soo	Miss Shin's Daring Adventure
2009	32	Kim Jun-young	Scandal Makers
2009	32	Park Yong-soo	Aeja
2014	34	Kim Jong-seon	National Singing Contest
2014	34	Kim Byung-jung	The War of the Dogs
2014	34	Park Jeong-sik	Pharisee
2015	35	Kim Hyeong-joo	How to Steal a Dog
2015	35	Yoon Joo-hwan	The Con Artists
2021	41	Yoo Il-seung	Waiting for Rain
2022	42	Yoon Ji-woon	Hommage
2023	43	Lee Seong-guk	Extreme Festival
2024	44	Park Min-woo	Oasis

=== Best Director Award Winners ===
Best Director Award Winners (1983 to present)

Year	Edition	Director	Film
1983	7	Kim In-soo	Jealousy
1984	8	Jung In-yeop	Madame Aema
1985	9	Jung Ji-young	Memory's Light
1986	10	Lee Tae-won	Riding the Elevator
1987	11	Shin Seung-soo	Moonlight Hunter
1988	12	Bae Chang-ho	Hello, God
1989	13	Go Young-nam	The Second Sex
1990	14	Kwak Jae-yong	A Sketch on a Rainy Day
1991	15	Kim Yu-jin	Simply Because You Are a Woman
1993	17	Kang Woo-suk	Mister Mamma
1994	18	Park Chul-soo	Our Twisted Hero
2006	29	—N/a	
2008	31	—N/a	
2009	32	Kim Yu-jin	The Divine Weapon
2011	33	—N/a	
2014	34	Jang Yoon-hyun	Gabi
2015	35	Yoon Je-kyoon	Ode to My Father
2016	36	Park Hoon-jung	The Tiger
2017	37	Hur Jin-ho	The Last Princess
2018	38	Jang Joon-hwan	1987: When the Day Comes
2019	39	Lee Han	Innocent Witness
2020	40	Jung Ji-young	Black Money
2021	41	Lee Joon-ik	The Book of Fish
2022	42	Park Chan-wook	Decision to Leave
2023	43	Ahn Tae-jin	The Night Owl
2024	44	Kim Jee-woon	Cobweb
2025	45	Choo Chang-min	Land of Happiness

=== New Director Award Winners ===
New Director Award Winners (1992 to present)

New Director Award Winners
Year	Edition	Winner	Work(s)
1992	16	Nam Man-won	Milk Chocolate
1993	17	—N/a	
1994	18	—N/a	
1996	19	Lee Kwang-hoon	Dr. Bong
1997	20	Hong Sang-soo	The Day a Pig Fell into the Well
1998	21	Hur Jin-ho	Christmas in August
1999	22	Lee Jae-yong	An Affair
2000	23	Song Neung-han	The End of the Century
2001	24	Kim Dae-seung	Bungee Jumping of Their Own
2002	25	Lee Si-myung	2009 Lost Memories
2002	25	Jeon Yoon-soo	Besa Me Mucho
2003	26	Kim Kyung-hyung	My Tutor Friend
2004	27	Oh Sang-hoon	The Greatest Inheritance
2005	28	Jeong Yoon-cheol	Marathon
2006	29	Bang Eun-jin	Princess Aurora
2006	29	Park Kwang-hyun	Welcome to Dongmakgol
2007	30	Kim Yong-hwa	200 Pounds Beauty
2008	31	Na Hong-jin	The Chaser
2009	32	Park Geon-yong	Lift the King Kong
2011	33	—N/a	
2014	34	Kim Byung-woo	The Terror Live
2015	35	Jung Ju-ri	A Girl at My Door
2015	35	Han Jun-hee	Coin Locker Girl
2016	36	Jo Jung-rae	Spirits' Homecoming
2017	37	Chae Doo-byung	Olle
2018	38	Ahn Jae-seok	Let's Go, Rose
2018	38	Yoo Young-uee	Sermon on the Mount
2019	39	Kim Yoo-sung	Uhm Bok-dong
2020	40	Choi Mi-kyo	The Law of Murphy and Sally
2020	40	Kim Joon-sik	Between the Seasons
2020	40	Park Noo-ri	Money
2021	41	Seo Yoo-min	Recalled
2022	42	Jo Eun-ji	Perhaps Love
2023	43	Im Sung-yong	When Our Love Remains as a Fragrance
2024	44	Yoo Jae-sun	Sleep

=== Popular Actor Award Winner ===
New Artist Award Winners
Year	Edition	Category	Winner	Work(s)
1990	14	Popular Actor Award	Ahn Sung-ki	Nambugun
1990	14	Popular Actor Award	Bang Hee	
1991	15	Popular Actor Award	Shin Seong-il	
1991	15	Popular Actress Award	Kim Ji-mee	
1992	16	Special Award - Popular Actress	Jang Mi-hee	
1994	18	Popular Actress Award	Choi Jin-sil	I Wish for What Is Forbidden to Me
1996	19	Popular Actor Award	Choi Min-soo	
1996	19	Popular Actress Award	Jung Sun-kyung	
1997	20	Popular Actor Award	Han Suk-kyu	
1997	20	Popular Actress Award	Shim Hye-jin	
1999	22	Popular Actor Award	Choi Min-shik	Shiri
1999	22	Popular Actress Award	Jeon Do-yeon	A Promise
2000	23	Most Popular Actor	Park Joong-hoon	Nowhere to Hide
2000	23	Most Popular Actress	Shim Eun-ha	Tell Me Something
2001	24	Most Popular Actor	Lee Byung-hun	Joint Security Area
2001	24	Most Popular Actress	Ha Ji-won	Truth Game
2002	25th	Most Popular Actor	Cha Seung-won	Kick the Moon
2002	25th	Most Popular Actress	Lee Young-ae	The Gift
2002	25th	Netizen's Popular Actor	Park Jun-gyu	My Boss, My Hero
2003	26th	Most Popular Actress	Sol Kyung-gu	Public Enemy
2003	26th	Most Popular Actress	Choi Ji-woo	The President's Last Bang
2004	27th	Most Popular Actor	Yang Dong-geun	Wild Card
2004	27th	Most Popular Actress	Kim Sun-a	Great Expectations
2004	27th	Special Award	Lee Moon-sik	Shoulder to Shoulder
2004	27th	Special Award	Uhm Jung-hwa	Mr. Handy, Mr. Hong
2005	28th	Most Popular Actor	Jo Seung-woo	Marathon
2005	28th	Most Popular Actress	Go Doo-shim	My Mother, the Mermaid
2006	29th	Special Jury Award	Kim Sang-joong	My Boss, My Teacher
2006	29th	Special Jury Award	Lee Mi-yeon	Typhoon
2007	30th	Special Jury Award	Ahn Sung-ki	Radio Star
2007	30th	Special Jury Award	Park Joong-hoon	Radio Star
2008	31st	Popular Actor Award	Jung Jin-young	Sunny
2008	31st	Popular Actress Award	Soo Ae	Sunny
2009	32nd	Popular Actor Award	Lee Beom-soo	Lifting King Kong
2009	32nd	Popular Actress Award	Kim Bo-yeon	Possessed
2010	32nd	Popular Actor Award	Lee Byung-hun	Joint Security Area
2010	32nd	Popular Actress Award	Ha Ji-won	Truth Game
2011	33rd	Popular Actor Award	Lee Moon-sik; Shin Jung-geun	Battlefield Heroes
2011	33rd	Popular Actress Award	Han Eun-jung	Ghastly
2014	34th	Popular Actor Award	Jung Joon-ho	Marrying the Mafia V
2014	34th	Popular Actress Award	Chun Woo-hee	Han Gong-ju

=== Best Actor/Actress Award Winners ===
Supporting Actor/Actress Award Winners (2006 to present)

Best Actor/Actress Award Winners
Year	Edition	Category	Winner	Work(s)
1994	18	Best Actor	Lee Young-ha	Our Twisted Hero
1994	18	Special Award - Jury Award	Yoo Ji-won	Daughter of the President
2006	29	Best Actor	Hwang Jung-min	You Are My Sunshine
2006	29	Best Actress	Moon Geun-young	Innocent Steps
2007	30	Best Actor	Ryoo Seung-bum	Bloody Tie
2007	30	Best Actress	Jang Jin-young	Between Love and Hate
2008	31	Best Actor	Ha Jung-woo	The Chaser
2008	31	Best Actress	Park Jin-hee	Shadows in the Palace
2009	32	Best Actor	Jung Jae-young	Castaway on the Moon
2009	32	Best Actress	Han Da-gam	The Divine Weapon
2011	33	Best Actor	Jung Jin-young	Battlefield Heroes
2011	33	Best Actress	Jung Yu-mi	My Gangster Girlfriend
2014	34	Best Actor	Go Soo	Way Back Home
2014	34	Best Actress	Kim Sun-a	The Five
2015	35	Best Actor	Sol Kyung-gu	My Dictator
2015	35	Best Actress	Kim Hye-soo	Coin Locker Girl
2016	36	Best Actor	Yoo Ah-in	Veteran
2016	36	Best Actress	Uhm Ji-won	The Phone
2017	37	Best Actor	Park Hae-il	The Last Princess
2017	37	Best Actress	Gong Hyo-jin	Missing
2018	38	Best Actor	Kim Yoon-seok	1987: When the Day Comes
2018	38	Best Actress	Choi Hee-seo	Anarchist from Colony
2019	39	Best Actor	Ju Ji-hoon	Dark Figure of Crime
2019	39	Best Actress	Kim Hyang-gi	Innocent Witness
2020	40	Best Actor	Jo Jin-woong	Black Money
2020	40	Best Actress	Lee Hanee	Black Money
2021	41	Best Actor	Sol Kyung-gu	The Book of Fish
2021	41	Best Actress	Chun Woo-hee	Waiting for Rain
2022	42	Best Actor	Park Hae-il	Decision to Leave
2022	42	Best Actress	Tang Wei	Decision to Leave
2023	43	Best Actor	Ryu Jun-yeol	The Night Owl
2023	43	Best Actress	Kim Seo-hyung	Greenhouse
2024	44	Best Actor	Song Kang-ho	Cobweb
2024	44	Best Actress	Jung So-min	Love Reset
2025	45	Best Actor	Jo Jung-suk	My Daughter Is a Zombie
2025	45	Best Actress	Jeon Yeo-been	Dark Nuns

=== Supporting Actor/Actress Award Winners ===
Supporting Actor/Actress Award Winners (2014 to present)

Supporting Actor Award Winners
Year	Edition	Category	Winner	Work(s)
2014	34	Best Supporting Actor	Oh Dal-su	Miracle in Cell No. 7
2014	34	Best Supporting Actor	Im Hyung-joon	Confession of Murder
2014	34	Best Supporting Actress	Jeon Mi-seon	Hide and Seek
2015	35	Best Supporting Actor	Park Chul-min	The Long Way Home
2015	35	Best Supporting Actor	Yoo Hae-jin	The Pirates
2015	35	Best Supporting Actress	Han Ji-min	Salut d'Amour
2016	36	Best Supporting Actor	Kim In-kwon	Himalaya
2016	36	Best Supporting Actress	Ryu Hyun-kyung	Office
2017	37	Best Supporting Actor	Uhm Tae-goo	The Age of Shadows
2017	37	Best Supporting Actress	Han Ji-min	The Age of Shadows
2018	38	Best Supporting Actor	Kim Dong-wook	Along with the Gods: The Two Worlds
2018	38	Best Supporting Actress	Park Ha-sun	Midnight Runners
2019	39	Best Supporting Actor	Yoon Kyung-ho	Intimate Strangers
2019	39	Best Supporting Actress	Kim Sun-young	Mal-Mo-E: The Secret Mission
2020	40	Best Supporting Actor	Lee Kwang-soo	Inseparable Bros
2020	40	Best Supporting Actress	Kim Mi-kyung	Kim Ji-young, Born 1982
2021	41	Best Supporting Actor	Kim Hee-won	Pawn
2021	41	Best Supporting Actress	Jang Hye-jin	More Than Family
2022	42	Best Supporting Actor	Park Ji-hwan	The Roundup
2022	42	Best Supporting Actress	Park Se-wan	6/45
2023	43	Best Supporting Actor	Choi Moo-sung	The Night Owl
2023	43	Best Supporting Actress	Lee Yoon-ji	Dream Palace
2024	44	Best Supporting Actor	Kim Min-jae	The Roundup: Punishment
2024	44	Best Supporting Actress	Yeom Hye-ran	Citizen of a Kind
2025	45	Best Supporting Actor	Ko Chang-seok	The Match
2025	45	Best Supporting Actress	Kwak Sun-young	Lobby

=== New Actor Award Winners ===
New Actor Award Winner (1981 to present)

New Actor Award Winners
Year	Edition	Category	Winner	Work(s)
1981	5	Special Award (New Face)	Kwon Ki-seon	Winter Love
1984	8	Special Award (New Face)	Oh Soo-bi	Madam Aema
1985	9	Special Award (New Face)	Kang Min-kyung	Blue Sky Galaxy
1987	11	Special Award (New Face)	Choi Min-soo	Son of God
1988	12	Special Award (New Face)	Shin Hye-soo	Adada
1989	13	New Acting Award	Choi Soo-ji	Sweet Brides
1990	14	New Acting Award	Kang Seok-hyun	A Sketch on a Rainy Day
1991	15	New Acting Award	Choi Jin-sil	My Love, My Bride
1992	16	New Acting Award	Park Young-sun	Lover Who Came on a Bicycle
1992	16	New Acting Award	Lee Ah-ro	Stairway to Heaven
1993	17	New Acting Award	Uhm Jung-hwa	On a Windy Day We Should Go to Apgujeong
1994	18	New Acting Award	Kim Mi-young, Jeon Mi-seon, Jo Soo-hye	Our Twisted Hero
1996	19	New Actor Award	Lee Byung-hun	Runaway
1996	19	New Actress Award	Kim Eun-jung	Runaway
1997	20	New Actor Award	Kim Eui-sung	The Day a Pig Fell into the Well
1997	20	New Actress Award	Jo Eun-sook	The Day a Pig Fell into the Well
1998	21	New Actor Award	(No Winner)	
1998	21	New Actress Award	Choi Ji-woo	The Trap
1999	22	New Actor Award	(No Winner)	
1999	22	New Actress Award	Kim Yun-jin	Shiri
1999	22	New Actress Award	Kim Gyu-ri	Whispering Corridors
2000	23	New Actor Award	Sol Kyung-gu	Peppermint Candy
2000	23	New Actress Award	Park Jin-hee	The Promenade
2001	24	New Actor Award	Kim Tae-woo	Joint Security Area
2001	24	New Actress Award	Seo Jung	The Isle
2002	25	New Actor Award	Cha Tae-hyun	My Sassy Girl
2002	25	New Actress Award	Seo Won	Bad Guy
2003	26	New Actor Award	Park Hae-il	Scent of Chrysanthemums
2003	26	New Actress Award	Kim Sun-a	Yesterday
2004	27	New Actor Award	Won Bin	Taegukgi
2004	27	New Actress Award	Kim Hyo-jin	The Legend of Evil Lake
2005	28	New Actor Award	Kang Dong-won	Temptation of Wolves
2005	28	New Actress Award	Lee Chung-ah	Temptation of Wolves
2006	29	New Actor Award	Lee Joon-gi	The King and the Clown
2006	29	New Actress Award	Hyun Young	The Art of Seduction
2007	30	New Actor Award	On Ju-wan	The Peter Pan Formula
2007	30	New Actress Award	Kim Ah-joong	200 Pounds Beauty
2008	31	New Actor Award	Jin Goo	Epitaph
2008	31	New Actor Award	Daniel Henney	My Father
2008	31	New Actress Award	Lee Yeon-hee	M
2008	31	New Actress Award	Han Ye-seul	Miss Shin's Daring Adventure
2009	32	New Actor Award	Kim Ji-seok	Take Off
2009	32	New Actor Award	Cho Seung-woo	Go Go 70s
2009	32	New Actress Award	Park Bo-young	Scandal Makers
2009	32	New Actress Award	Jeon Se-hong	Missing
2011	33	New Acting Award	Ji Sung-won	The Full Story of Kim Bok-nam Murder Case
2014	34	New Actor Award	Jung Kyung-ho	Roller Coaster
2014	34	New Actress Award	Kang Eun-hye	Pharisee
2014	34	New Actress Award	Kim Yoon-hye	Girl
2014	34	New Actress Award	Jeon Soo-jin	I Love You, Jin-young!
2015	35	New Actor Award	Kang Ha-neul	Twenty
2015	35	New Actor Award	Yoo Yeon-seok	The Royal Tailor
2015	35	New Actress Award	Kim Sae-ron	A Girl at My Door
2015	35	New Actress Award	Hong Ah-reum	Makgeolli Girls
2016	36	New Actor Award	Park Jung-min	Dongju: The Portrait of a Poet
2016	36	New Actor Award	Lee Ho-won	Hiya
2016	36	New Actress Award	Seo Mi-ji	Spirits' Homecoming
2017	37	New Actor Award	Lee Ju-won	Alone
2017	37	New Actress Award	Kim Hee-jin	Operation Chromite
2017	37	New Actress Award	Park Na-ye	Worm
2018	38	New Actor Award	Kim Shin-eui	Let's Go, Rose
2018	38	New Actor Award	Baek Seo-bin	Sermon on the Mount
2018	38	New Actress Award	Choi Ri	Keys to the Heart
2019	39	New Actor Award	Sung Yu-bin	Last Child
2019	39	New Actress Award	Park Hye-su	Swing Kids
2019	39	New Actress Award	Lee Jae-in	Svaha: The Sixth Finger
2020	40	New Actor Award	Kim Sung-kyu	The Gangster, The Cop, The Devil
2020	40	New Actor Award	Woo Do-hwan	The Divine Fury
2020	40	New Actress Award	Kim So-hye	Moonlit Winter
2020	40	New Actress Award	Yoon Hye-ri	Between the Seasons
2021	41	New Actor Award	Park Bo-gum	Seobok
2021	41	New Actress Award	Min Do-hee	The Book of Fish
2022	42	New Actor Award	Choi Woo-sung	Room Sharing
2022	42	New Actress Award	Lee Ji-eun	Broker
2023	43	New Actor Award	Kang Tae-joo	The Childe
2023	43	New Actress Award	Kim Si-eun	Next Sohee
2024	44	New Actor Award	Yoo Seon-ho	Debt Boy
2024	44	New Actress Award	Kim Ah-young	Marrying the Mafia: Returns

== Past Winners by Year ==
Past Winners by ceremony (1977 to 1980)

=== 1st (1977) ===
Category	Winner	Film
Cinematography - Gold	Paeng Jeong-mun	A Girl's Prayer
Cinematography - Silver	Gu Jung-mo	Villains, Take the Express Train to Hell
Cinematography - Bronze	Seo Jeong-min	Cho-yeon

=== 2nd (1978) ===
Category	Winner	Film
Cinematography - Gold	Seo Jeong-min	The Last Day of Dosolsan
Cinematography - Silver	Jeong Woon-gyo	Laughter
Cinematography - Bronze	Son Hyeon-chae	Policeman (1979 film)

=== 3rd (1979) ===
Category	Winner	Film
Cinematography - Gold	Jeon Jo-myeong	A Close Yet Far Road
Cinematography - Silver	Lee Seong-chun	Sonagi
Cinematography - Bronze	Lee Seok-gi	Tomorrow and Another Tomorrow (film)

=== 4th (1980) ===
Category	Winner	Film
Cinematography - Gold	Lee Seok-gi	That Man at That Time (film)
Cinematography - Silver	Yu Yeong-gil	The Rainy Season
Cinematography - Bronze	Jeon Jo-myeong	A Woman with Color

Past Winners by ceremony (1981 to 1990)

=== 5th (1981) ===
Category	Winner	Film
Cinematography - Gold	Son Hyeon-chae	The Hut
Cinematography - Silver	Lee Seok-gi	A Woman Who Laughs Three Times
Cinematography - Bronze	Paeng Jeong-mun	Run, Balloon
Special Award - Associate Member	Heo Eung-hoe	The Hut
Special Award - New Face	Kwon Ki-seon	Winter Love

=== 6th (1982) ===
Category	Winner	Film
Cinematography - Gold	Seo Jeong-min	They Shot the Sun
Cinematography - Silver	Lee Seong-chun	The Fixer
Cinematography - Bronze	Jeon Jo-myeong	A Maiden Who Went to the City
Cinematography - New Artist	Jeong Pil-si	Friend, Go Quietly
Special Award - Associate Member	Shin Ok-hyeon	They Shot the Sun
Special Award - Lighting	Kim Kang-il	They Shot the Sun

=== 7th (1983) ===
Category	Winner	Film
Cinematography - Gold	Gu Jung-mo	Jealousy
Cinematography - Silver	Lee Seong-seop	Nameless Woman
Cinematography - Bronze	Park Seong-deok	Madam Rose
Cinematography - Bronze	Paeng Jeong-mun	Applause (1982 film)
Special Award - Director	Kim In-soo	Jealousy (1983 film)
Special Award - Associate Member	Park Hyeon-guk	Jealousy (1983 film)
Special Award - Lighting	Son Han-soo	Jealousy (1983 film)

=== 8th (1984) ===
Category	Winner	Film
Cinematography - Gold	Lee Seok-gi	Ae-ma Bu-in
Cinematography - Silver	Jeong Gwang-seok	End of the Equator
Cinematography - Bronze	Seo Jeong-min	Declaration of Fools
Cinematography - Bronze	Jeong Il-man	Sohwaseong Undertaker
Special Award - Director	Jeong In-yeop	Ae-ma Bu-in
Special Award - New Face	Oh Soo-bi	Ae-ma Bu-in
Special Award - Associate Member	Ahn Tae-wan	Ae-ma Bu-in
Special Award - Lighting	Son Yeong-cheol	Ae-ma Bu-in

=== 9th (1985) ===
Category	Winner	Film
Cinematography - Gold	Yu Yeong-gil	Memories of Light
Cinematography - Silver	Jin Yeong-ho	Moonlight Melody
Cinematography - Bronze	Ahn Tae-wan	Blue Sky, Milky Way (1986 film)
Special Award - Director	Jeong Ji-yeong	Memories of Light
Special Award - New Face	Kang Min-gyeong	Blue Sky, Milky Way (1986 film)
Special Award - Associate Member	Gwak Jeom-seok	Memories of Light
Special Award - Lighting	Ma Yong-cheon	Memories of Light

=== 10th (1986) ===
Category	Winner	Film
Cinematography - Gold	Gu Jung-mo	Riding the Elevator
Cinematography - Silver	Jeon Jo-myeong	Into the Night Heat (1985 film)
Cinematography - Bronze	Hong Dong-hyeok	Never Say Never
Cinematography - Bronze	Jeong Woon-gyo	A Woman Fights Once
Special Award - Director	Lee Tae-won	Riding the Elevator
Special Award - Associate Member	Seo Gyeong-woong	Riding the Elevator
Special Award - Lighting	Son Han-soo	Riding the Elevator

=== 11th (1987) ===
Category	Winner	Film
Cinematography - Gold	Jeong Gwang-seok	Long Journey, Long Tunnel
Cinematography - Silver	Park Seung-bae	Moonlight Hunter
Cinematography - Silver	Shin Ok-hyeon	Heroic Love Song
Cinematography - Bronze	Lee Seong-seop	Dolswe's Wind
Special Award - Director	Shin Seung-soo	Moonlight Hunter
Special Award - New Face	Choi Min-soo	Son of God (film)
Special Award - Associate Member	Park Hee-joo	Long Journey, Long Tunnel
Special Award - Lighting	Lee Min-bu	Long Journey, Long Tunnel

=== 12th (1988) ===
Category	Winner	Film
Cinematography - Gold	Yu Yeong-gil	Hello God
Cinematography - Silver	Gu Jung-mo	Blue Heart
Cinematography - Bronze	Park Seung-bae	Y's Experience
Special Award - Director	Bae Chang-ho	Hello God
Special Award - New Face	Shin Hye-soo	Adada (film)
Special Award		

=== 13th (1989) ===
Category	Winner	Film
Cinematography - Gold Award	—N/a	
Cinematography - Silver Award	Peng Jeong-mun	The Curiosity of the Wolf Stole the Dove
Cinematography - Bronze Award	Jin Young-ho	Hollyhock
Cinematography - Bronze Award	Shin Ok-hyeon	Sweet Brides
Cinematography - New Artist Award	Choi Chan-gyu	City of Fog
Special Award - Director	Ko Young-nam	The Second Sex
Special Award - Lighting	Cha Jeong-nam	Gagman
New Artist Acting Award	Choi Su-ji	Sweet Brides

=== 14th (1990) ===
Category	Winner	Film
Cinematography - Gold Award	Yang Young-gil	Watercolor Painting in a Rainy Day
Cinematography - Silver Award	—N/a	
Cinematography - Bronze Award	Jin Young-ho	Red Actress
Cinematography - New Artist Award	Gu Gyo-han	Era of Prostitution
Special Award - Director	Kwak Jae-yong	Watercolor Painting in a Rainy Day
Special Award - Lighting	Park Chang-ho	Watercolor Painting in a Rainy Day
Special Award - Associate Member	Yang Beom-sik	Watercolor Painting in a Rainy Day
New Artist Acting Award	Kang Seok-hyun	Watercolor Painting in a Rainy Day
Popular Actor Award	Ahn Sung-ki	
Popular Actress Award	Bang Hee	

Past Winners by ceremony (1991 to 2000)

=== 15th (1991) ===
Category	Recipient	Work
Cinematography - Gold Award	Yoo Young-gil	My Love, My Bride
Cinematography - Silver Award	No Recipient	
Cinematography - Bronze Award	Choi Chan-gyu	That Woman No Longer Lives Here
Cinematography - New Cinematographer Award	Heo Eung-hee	Joseon Women's Fate
Special Award - Director	Kim Yoo-jin	Only Because You Are a Woman
Special Award - Lighting	Lee Seung-gu	That Woman No Longer Lives Here
New Actress Award	Choi Jin-sil	My Love, My Bride
Popular Actor Award	Shin Seong-il	
Popular Actress Award	Kim Ji-mee	

=== 16th (1992) ===
Category	Recipient	Work
Cinematography - Gold Award	Jin Young-ho	Tears of Seoul
Cinematography - Silver Award	Choi Jeong-won	Milk Chocolate
Cinematography - Bronze Award	Jung Pil-si	From Seomgang to Sky
Cinematography - New Cinematographer Award	Lee Dong-sam	Lovers Who Came by Bicycle
Best New Director	Nam Man-won	Milk Chocolate
Lighting Award	Lim Jae-young	Praise of Death
New Actor Award	Lee A-ro	Stairway to Heaven
New Actor Award	Park Young-sun	Lovers Who Came by Bicycle
Special Award - Popular Actress	Jang Mi-hee	
Special Award - Most Productions	Taehung Pictures	
Special Award - Best Film Production	Geukdong Screen	

=== 17th (1993) ===
Category	Recipient	Work
Cinematography - Gold Award	Jung Gwang-seok	Blue in You
Cinematography - Silver Award	Shin Ok-hyun	Mr. Mamma
Cinematography - Bronze Award	Park Seong-deok	Continent of Ambition
Cinematography - New Cinematographer Award	Han Deok-jeon	The Guardian of the Heart
Best Director	Kang Woo-suk	Mr. Mamma
Popular Actress Award	Kang Soo-yeon	Blue in You
Lighting Award	Shin Hak-seong	Blue in You
New Actress Award	Uhm Jung-hwa	If the Wind Blows, I Must Go to Apgujeong
Associate Member Special Award	Kim Yoon-soo	Blue in You
Non-Fiction Film Award	Jang Seok-hoon	Reveille
Special Jury Award	Hong Yeo-jin	Dangerous Level

=== 18th (1994) ===
Category	Recipient	Work
Cinematography - Gold Award	Seo Jeong-min	Absolute Love
Cinematography - Silver Award	Park Seung-bae	Our Twisted Hero
Cinematography - Bronze Award	Lee Dong-sam	Love is Pro, Marriage is Amateur
Cinematography - New Cinematographer Award	Kim Jin-cheol	Some Things I Know About Sex
Best Director	Park Chul-soo	Our Twisted Hero
Best Actor	Lee Young-ha	Our Twisted Hero
Special Award - Jury Award	Yoo Ji-won	President's Daughter
Popular Actress Award	Choi Jin-sil	I Wish for What Is Forbidden to Me
Lighting Award	Kim Dong-ho	I Wish for What Is Forbidden to Me
New Artist Acting Award	Kim Mi-young, Jo Su-hye, Jeon Mi-seon	Our Twisted Hero
Associate Member Special Award	Jang Jun-young	Absolute Love
Cultural Film Award	Lee Sang-chan	Smile of Compassion

=== 19th (1996) ===
Category	Recipient	Work
Cinematography - Gold Award	Jung Gwang-seok	Runaway
Cinematography - Silver Award	Shin Ok-hyun	The Terrorist
Cinematography - Bronze Award	Park Gyeong-won	Daddy's Bodyguard
Cinematography - New Cinematographer Award	Lee Eun-gil	301, 302
Best New Director	Lee Gwang-hoon	Dr. Bong
Most Popular Actor Award	Choi Min-soo	
Most Popular Actress Award	Jung Sun-kyung	
Lighting Award	Lim Jae-young	The Terrorist
Best New Actor	Lee Byung-hun	Runaway
Best New Actress	Kim Eun-jung	Runaway
Associate Member Special Award	Kim Yoon-soo	The Terrorist
Production Achievement Award	Lim Chung-ryeol (Sunick Film)	The Terrorist

=== 20th (1997) ===
Category	Recipient(s)	Work(s)
Cinematography - Gold Award	Seo Jeong-min	Piano Man
Cinematography - Silver Award	Yoo Young-gil	Green Fish
Cinematography - Bronze Award	Jeon Jo-myung	Firebird
Cinematography - New Cinematographer Award	Park Hee-ju	A Great Life
Best New Director	Hong Sang-soo	The Day a Pig Fell into the Well
Popular Actor Award	Han Suk-kyu	
Popular Actress Award	Shim Hye-jin	
New Actor Award	Kim Eui-sung	The Day a Pig Fell into the Well
New Actress Awarrd	Jo Eun-sook	The Day a Pig Fell into the Well
Lighting Award	Shin Jun-ha	A Great Life
Associate Member Special Award	Lee Ki-tae	Firebird
Production Achievement Award	Lee Woo-seok	Dong-A Export Co

=== 21st (1998) ===
Category	Recipient(s)	Work(s)
Cinematography - Gold Award	Lee Dong-sam	The Net
Cinematography - Silver Award	Park Seung-bae	No. 3
Cinematography - Bronze Award	Park Gyeong-won	The Letter
Cinematography - New Cinematographer Award	Lee Seok-hyun	Blackjack
Best New Director	Hur Jin-ho	Christmas in August
Most Popular Actor Award	Park Shin-yang	The Letter
Lighting Award	Kim Dong-ho	Blackjack
Best New Actress	Choi Ji-woo	The Net
Associate Member Special Award	Shin Beom-seop	The Net
Production Achievement Award	Cha Seung-jae	Uno Film
Production Achievement Award	Go Jeong-seok	Ilshin Startup

=== 22nd (1999) ===
Category	Recipient	Work
Cinematography - Gold Award	Jeon Jo-myung	A Promise
Cinematography - Silver Award	Kim Sung-bok	Shiri
Cinematography - Bronze Award	Kim Hyung-gu	City of the Rising Sun
Cinematography - New Cinematographer Award	Kim Young-cheol	An Affair
Best New Director	Lee Jae-yong	An Affair
Most Popular Actor	Choi Min-sik	Shiri
Most Popular Actress	Jeon Do-yeon	A Promise
Lighting Award	Yoon Hong-sik	Shiri
Makeup Award	Lee Kyung-ja	City of the Rising Sun
Best New Actress	Kim Gyu-ri	Whispering Corridors
Best New Actress	Kim Yunjin	Shiri
Production Achievement Award	Shin Chul	ShinCine)
Production Achievement Award	Lee Choon-yeon	Cine2000

=== 23rd (2000) ===
Category	Recipient	Work
Cinematography - Gold Award	Song Haeng-gi	Nowhere to Hide
Cinematography - Silver Award	Choi Jeong-woo	Attack the Gas Station!
Cinematography - Bronze Award	Lee Seok-hyun	The Spy
Cinematography - New Cinematographer Award	Lee Hoo-gon	End of the Century
Best New Director	Song Neung-han	End of the Century
Most Popular Actor	Park Joong-hoon	Nowhere to Hide
Most Popular Actress	Shim Eun-ha	Tell Me Something
Lighting Award	Lee Kang-san	Peppermint Candy
Best New Actor	Sol Kyung-gu	Peppermint Candy
Best New Actress	Park Jin-hee	Walk
Production Achievement Award	Shim Jae-myung	Myung Film
Production Achievement Award	Ahn Dong-gyu	Movie World

Past Winners by ceremony (2001 to 2010)

=== 24th (2001) ===
Category	Recipient(s)	Work(s)
Cinematography - Gold Award	Seo Jeong-min	Libera Me
Cinematography - Silver Award	Moon Yong-sik	Secret
Cinematography - Bronze Award	Park Seung-ho	The Artist
Cinematography - Bronze Award	Byun Hee-sung	Bichunmoo
Best New Director	Kim Dae-seung	Bungee Jumping of Their Own
Most Popular Actor	Lee Byung-hun	Joint Security Area
Most Popular Actress	Ha Ji-won	Truth Game
Best New Actor	Kim Tae-woo	Joint Security Area
Best New Actress	Seo Jung	The Isle
Production Achievement Award	Shim Jae-myung	Myung Film
Production Achievement Award	Kang Je-gyu	Kang Je-gyu Film
Production Achievement Award	Choi Geun-ho	Korea Kodak Developing Lab

=== 25th (2002) ===
Category	Recipient(s)	Work(s)
Cinematography - Gold Award	Kim Hyung-gu	Musa the Warrior
Cinematography - Silver Award	Lee Seok-hyun	The Gift
Cinematography - Bronze Award	Park Hee-ju	Besa Me Mucho
New Cinematographer Award	Lee Ki-tae	Leaves
Best New Director	Lee Si-myung	2009 Lost Memories
Best New Director	Jeon Yoon-soo	Besa Me Mucho
Best New Actor	Cha Tae-hyun	My Sassy Girl
Best New Actress	Seo Won	Bad Guy
Most Popular Actor	Cha Seung-won	Kick the Moon
Most Popular Actress	Lee Young-ae	The Gift
Netizen's Popular Male Actor	Park Jun-gyu	My Boss, My Hero
Associate Member Award	Park Ju-hyun	Besa Me Mucho
Production Achievement Award	Kim Doo-chan (Zenith Entertainment)	

=== 26th (2003) ===
Category	Recipient(s)	Work(s)
Cinematography - Gold Award	Moon Yong-sik	Phone
Cinematography - Silver Award	Jeong Han-cheol	Yesterday
Cinematography - Bronze Award	Choi Chan-gyu	A Little Monk
New Cinematographer Award	Choi Ji-yeol	Blue
New Cinematographer Award	Shin Hyun-jung	Are You Ready?
Best New Director	Lee Jeong-wook	Scent of Chrysanthemums
Best New Director	Kim Kyung-hyung	My Tutor Friend
Most Popular Actor	Sol Kyung-gu	Public Enemy
Most Popular Actress	Choi Ji-woo	The President's Last Bang
Lighting Award	Choi Sung-won	Phone
Best New Actor	Park Hae-il	Scent of Chrysanthemums
Best New Actress	Kim Sun-a	Yesterday
Associate Member Award	Hong Seung-wan	Phone

=== 27th (2004) ===
Category	Recipient(s)	Work(s)
Cinematography - Gold Award	Byun Hee-sung	Wild Card
Cinematography - Silver Award	Choi Ji-yeol	The Butterfly
Cinematography - Bronze Award	Kim Sung-bok	Silmido
New Cinematographer Award	Ji Kil-woong	Once Upon a Time in a Battlefield
Best New Director	Oh Sang-hoon	Great Expectations
Most Popular Actor	Yang Dong-geun	Wild Card
Most Popular Actress	Kim Sun-a	Great Expectations
Lighting Award	Im Jae-young	Wild Card
Best New Actor	Won Bin	Taegukgi
Best New Actress	Kim Hyo-jin	The Legend of the Evil Lake
Associate Member Award	Oh Jong-hyun	Wild Card
Special Jury Award	Kang Je-gyu	Taegukgi
Special Award	Lee Moon-sik	Shoulder to Shoulder
Special Award	Uhm Jung-hwa	Mr. Handy, Mr. Hong

=== 28th (2005) ===
Category	Recipient(s)	Work(s)
Cinematography - Gold Award	Kim Hyung-gu	Rikidōzan
Cinematography - Silver Award	Lee Joon-gyu	Arahan
Cinematography - Bronze Award	Seok Hyung-jing	R-Point
New Cinematographer Award	Kim Hyo-jin	Liar
New Cinematographer Award	Kim Dong-cheon	Bunshinsaba
New Cinematographer Award	Park Sang-hoon	Spin Kick
Best New Director	Jeong Yoon-cheol	Marathon
Grand Prize for Acting	Jung Joon-ho	Public Enemy 2
Most Popular Male Actor	Jo Seung-woo	Marathon
Most Popular Female Actor	Go Doo-shim	My Mother, the Mermaid
Lighting Award	Lee Kang-san	Rikidōzan
Best New Actor	Kang Dong-won	Temptation of Wolves
Best New Actress	Lee Chung-ah	Temptation of Wolves
Associate Member Award	Kang Seung-gi	Rikidōzan
Special Jury Award	Jung Doo-hong	Arahan

=== 29th (2006) ===
Category	Recipient(s)	Work(s)
Cinematography - Gold Award	Ji Kil-woong	The King and the Clown
Cinematography - Silver Award	Park Sang-hoon	Love
Cinematography - Bronze Award	Jin Young-hwan	Mr. Socrates
New Cinematographer Award	Choi Sang-ho	Welcome to Dongmakgol
Best Film	Eagle Pictures	The King and the Clown
Best New Director	Bang Eun-jin	Princess Aurora
Best New Director	Park Kwang-hyun	Welcome to Dongmakgol
Grand Prize for Acting	Lee Jung-jae	Typhoon
Best Actor	Hwang Jung-min	You Are My Sunshine
Best Actress	Moon Geun-young	Dancing Princess
Lighting Award	Lee Man-gyu	Welcome to Dongmakgol
Best New Actor	Lee Joon-gi	The King and the Clown
Best New Actress	Hyun Young	Working with the King
Special Jury Award	Kim Sang-joong	My Boss, My Teacher
Special Jury Award	Lee Mi-yeon	Typhoon

=== 30th (2007) ===
Category	Recipient(s)	Work(s)
Cinematography - Gold Award	Park Hyun-cheol	200 Pounds Beauty
Cinematography - Silver Award	Oh Hyun-je	Bloody Tie
Cinematography - Bronze Award	Kim Young-ho	The Restless
New Cinematographer Award	Sung Jong-moo	Time
Best New Director	Kim Yong-hwa	200 Pounds Beauty
Grand Prize for Acting	Song Kang-ho	The Host
Best Actor	Ryu Seung-beom	Bloody Tie
Best Actress	Jang Jin-young	Blue Sky in Your Heart
Lighting Award	Im Jae-young	Bloody Tie
Best New Actor	On Joo-wan	The Peter Pan Formula
Best New Actress	Kim Ah-joong	200 Pounds Beauty
Special Jury Award	Ahn Sung-ki, Park Joong-hoon	Radio Star
Special Award	Jung Jin-woo, Kim Dong-ho, Kodak Co., Ltd.	

=== 31st (2008) ===
Category	Recipient(s)	Work(s)
Cinematography - Gold Award	Kim Hyung-gu	Happiness
Cinematography - Silver Award	Moon Yong-sik	Once Upon a Time
Cinematography - Bronze Award	Shin Ok-hyun	Open City
New Cinematographer Award	Kim Hak-soo	Miss Gold Digger
Best Film	Zip Cinema	Happiness
Best Actor	Ha Jung-woo	The Chaser
Best Actress	Park Jin-hee	Shadows in the Palace
Lighting Award	Lee Sung-hwan	Open City
Best New Director	Na Hong-jin	The Chaser
Best New Actor	Daniel Henney	My Father
Best New Actor	Jin Goo	Epitaph
Best New Actress	Lee Yeon-hee	M
Best New Actress	Han Ye-seul	Miss Gold Digger
Popular Actor Award	Jung Jin-young	Sunny
Popular Actress Award	Soo Ae	Sunny

=== 32nd (2009) ===
Category	Recipient(s)	Work(s)
Cinematography - Gold Award	Byun Hee-sung	Divine Weapon
Cinematography - Silver Award	Hong Kyung-pyo	Mother
Cinematography - Bronze Award	Jeong Han-cheol	Missing
New Cinematographer Award	Park Yong-soo	Aeja
New Cinematographer Award	Kim Jun-young	Scandal Makers
Best Film	RG Ent. Works	Lifting King Kong
Best Director	Kim Yoo-jin	Divine Weapon
Best Actor	Jung Jae-young	Castaway on the Moon
Best Actress	Han Eun-jung	Divine Weapon
Lighting Award	Kim Seung-gyu	Portrait of a Beauty
Best New Director	Park Geon-yong	Lifting King Kong
Best New Actor	Cha Seung-woo	Go Go 70s
Best New Actor	Kim Ji-seok	Take Off
Best New Actress	Park Bo-young	Scandal Makers
Best New Actress	Jeon Se-hong	Missing
Popular Actor Award	Lee Beom-soo	Lifting King Kong
Popular Actress Award	Kim Bo-yeon	Possessed

Past Winners by ceremony (2011 to 2020)

=== 33rd (2011) ===
Category	Recipient(s)	Work(s)
Cinematography - Gold Award	Lee Tae-yoon	The Man from Nowhere
Cinematography - Silver Award	Kim Woo-hyung	No Mercy
Cinematography - Bronze Award	Kim Ki-tae	Bedevilled
New Artist Award	Ji Sung-won	Bedevilled
Best Film		
Best Actor	Jung Jin-young	Battlefield Heroes
Best Actress	Jung Yu-mi	My Dear Desperado
Popular Actor Award	Lee Moon-sik, Shin Jung-geun	Battlefield Heroes
Popular Actress Award	Han Eun-jung	Ghastly
Short Film Director Award	Yoo In-young	Can You Remember Only the Pleasant Times?
Achievement Award	Ahn Sung-ki	
Contribution to Film Development Award	Korea Racing Authority	
Young Planning Award	Park Na-na (Producer)	
Science and Technology Award	Kim Dong-min	DM Lite CEO

=== 34th (2014) ===
Category	Recipient(s)	Work(s)
Cinematography - Gold Award	Oh Hyun-je	Gabi
Cinematography - Silver Award	Kim Ki-tae	Confession of Murder
Cinematography - Bronze Award	Choi Sang-muk	The Unseen
New Cinematographer Award	Park Jeong-sik	Pharisee
New Cinematographer Award	Kim Byeong-jeong	War of the Dogs
New Cinematographer Award	Kim Jong-seon	National Singing Contest
Best Film		Miracle in Cell No. 7
Best Director	Jang Yoon-hyun	Gabi
Grand Prize for Acting	Ha Jung-woo	The Terror Live
Best Actor	Go Soo	Way Back Home
Best Actress	Kim Sun-a	The Five
Best Supporting Actor	Oh Dal-su	Miracle in Cell No. 7
Best Supporting Actor	Im Hyung-joon	Confession of Murder
Best Supporting Actress	Jeon Mi-seon	Hide and Seek
Best New Director	Kim Byung-woo	The Terror Live
Popular Actor Award	Jung Joon-ho	Marrying the Mafia V
Popular Actress Award	Chun Woo-hee	Han Gong-ju
Best New Actor	Jung Kyung-ho	Fasten Your Seatbelt
Best New Actress	Kim Yoon-hye	Girl
Best New Actress	Kang Eun-hye	Pharisee
Best New Actress	Jeon Su-jin	Love You, Jin-young!
Achievement Award	Kim Dong-soo; Chairman of Korea Entertainment Arts Vocational College	
Contribution to Film Development Award	Choi Sung (Mayor of Goyang)	
Technical Award	Son Mi-kyung; President of Korea Traditional Hair Association	
Technical Award	Kim Dong-min (CEO of Rumors Co., Ltd.)	
Special Jury Award for Male Actor	Jin Goo	26 Years
Special Jury Award for Female Actor	Moon Jeong-hee	Hide and Seek

=== 35th (2015) ===
Category	Recipient(s)	Work(s)
Cinematography - Gold Award	Hong Kyung-pyo	Haemoo
Cinematography - Silver Award	Jeong Han-cheol	Thorn
Cinematography - Bronze Award	Kim Hyun-seok	A Girl at My Door
New Cinematographer Award	Yoon Ju-hwan	The Con Artists
New Cinematographer Award	Kim Hyung-joo	How to Steal a Dog
Best Film	JK Film	Ode to My Father
Best Director	Yoon Je-kyoon	Ode to My Father
Grand Prize for Acting	Hwang Jung-min	Ode to My Father
Best Actor	Sol Kyung-gu	My Dictator
Best Actress	Kim Hye-soo	Coin Locker Girl
Best Supporting Actor	Park Chul-min	The Chronicles of Evil
Best Supporting Actor	Yoo Hae-jin	The Pirates
Best Supporting Actress	Han Ji-min	Salut d'Amour
Lighting Award	Kim Kyung-seok	The Whistleblower
Best New Director	Han Jun-hee	Coin Locker Girl
Best New Director	Jung Ju-ri	A Girl at My Door
Popular Actor Award	Ahn Sung-ki	Revivre
Popular Actress Award	Kim Ho-jung	Revivre
Best New Actor	Kang Ha-neul	Twenty
Best New Actor	Yoo Yeon-seok	The Royal Tailor
Best New Actress	Kim Sae-ron	A Girl at My Door
Best New Actress	Hong Ah-reum	Makgeolli Girls
Achievement Award	Geo Ryong Im Kwon-taek Kim Jin-moon (Art Cinema CEO) ||	
Special Jury Award	Lee Kyeong-yeong	The Whistleblower
Special Jury Award	Kim Sung-ryung	The Target

=== 36th (2016) ===
Category	Recipient(s)	Work(s)
Cinematography - Gold Award	Choi Young-hwan	Veteran
Cinematography - Silver Award	Choi Sang-ho	Missing You
Cinematography - Bronze Award	Choi Yong-jin	Dongju: The Portrait of a Poet
New Cinematographer Award	Kim Sang-hyup	Spirits' Homecoming
Best Film	Sanai Pictures Co., Ltd.	The Tiger: An Old Hunter's Tale
Best Director	Park Hoon-jung	The Tiger: An Old Hunter's Tale
Best Actor	Yoo Ah-in	Veteran
Best Actress	Uhm Ji-won	The Phone
Best Supporting Actor	Kim In-kwon	The Himalayas
Best Supporting Actress	Ryu Hyun-kyung	Office
Lighting Award	Kim Min-jae	The Silenced
Best New Director	Cho Jung-rae	Spirits' Homecoming
Popular Actor Award	Choi Il-hwa	The Treacherous
Popular Actress Award	Go Ah-sung	Office
Best New Actor	Park Jung-min	Dongju: The Portrait of a Poet
Best New Actor	Lee Ho-won	Hiya
Best New Actress	Seo Mi-ji	Spirits' Homecoming
International Star Award selected by Cinematographers	Siu Bie (China)	
Achievement Award	Choi Ha-won (Director)	
Achievement Award	Jeon Jo-myung (Cinematographer)	
Achievement Award	Yoo Jae-won	President of Korea National University of Media Arts
Achievement Award	Liu Junhui (International Category)	
Special Jury Award	Jung Man-sik	The Tiger: An Old Hunter's Tale
Special Jury Award	Jung Jae-yeon	Polaroid

=== 37th (2017) ===
Category	Recipient(s)	Work(s)
Cinematography - Gold Award	Kim Ki-tae	Because I Love You
Cinematography - Silver Award	Choi Chan-gyu	Sound of Memories
Cinematography - Bronze Award	Kim Byeong-jeong	Alone
New Cinematographer Award	Ahn Sung-gyun	Twenty Again
Lighting Award	Lim Jae-young	The Map Against the World
Grand Prize for Film	Warner Bros. Korea	The Age of Shadows
Best Director	Hur Jin-ho	The Last Princess
Grand Prize for Acting	Kwak Do-won	The Wailing
Best Actor	Park Hae-il	The Last Princess
Best Actress	Gong Hyo-jin	Missing
Best Supporting Actor	Uhm Tae-goo	The Age of Shadows
Best Supporting Actress	Han Ji-min	The Age of Shadows
Best New Director	Chae Doo-byeong	Olle
Popular Actor Award	Byun Yo-han	Will You Be There?
Popular Actress Award	Park Ju-hee	Queen of Walking
Best New Actor	Lee Ju-won	Alone
Best New Actor	Kim Hee-jin	Operation Chromite
Best New Actress	Park Na-ye	Worm
Child Actor Award	Kim Hwan-hee	The Wailing
Achievement Award	Jang Mi-hee	
Achievement Award	Shin Seong-il	
Achievement Award	Jung Il-sung (Cinematographer)	
Special Jury Award	Jung Joon-ho	Operation Chromite
Special Jury Award	Choi Hee-seo	How to Break Up with My Cat

=== 38rd (2018) ===
Category	Recipient(s)	Work(s)
Cinematography - Gold Award	Kim Tae-sung	Keys to the Heart
Cinematography - Silver Award	Yoon Hong-sik	Sermon on the Mount
Cinematography - Bronze Award	Jung Jae-seung	Original Sin
New Cinematographer Award	Hwang Sung-woon	Grendel
Best Film	Woojung Film	1987: When the Day Comes
Best Director	Jang Joon-hwan	1987: When the Day Comes
Grand Prize for Acting	Lee Byung-hun	Keys to the Heart
Best Actor	Kim Yoon-seok	1987: When the Day Comes
Best Actress	Choi Hee-seo	Anarchist from Colony
Best Supporting Actor	Kim Dong-wook	Along with the Gods: The Two Worlds
Best Supporting Actress	Park Ha-sun	Midnight Runners
Lighting Award	Kim Jae-geun	The Prison
New Director Award	Ahn Jae-seok	Blue Busking
New Director Award	Yoo Young-ui	Sermon on the Mount
New Actor Award	Kim Shin-eui	Blue Busking
New Actor Award	Baek Seo-bin	Sermon on the Mount
New Actress Award	Choi Ri	Keys to the Heart
Child Actor Award	Ahn Seo-hyun	Okja
Popular Actor Award	Lee Je-hoon	I Can Speak
Popular Actress Award	Moon So-ri	The Running Actress
Cinematographer Achievement Award	Jung Gwang-seok	
Film Director Achievement Award	Lee Jang-ho	
Actor Achievement Award	Go Doo-shim	Everglow
Contribution to Korean Cinema Award	Won Dong-yeon	Along with the Gods
Special Jury Award	Kim Sang-kyung	The Discloser
Special Jury Award	Na Young-hee	Forgotten

=== 39th (2019) ===
Category	Recipient(s)	Work(s)
Cinematography - Gold Award	Park Yong-soo	Uhm Bok-dong
Cinematography - Silver Award	Choi Chan-min	The Spy Gone North
Cinematography - Bronze Award	Seo Ki-won	Mother
New Cinematographer Award	Choi Deok-gyu	Brothers in Heaven
Best Film	Sanai Pictures	The Spy Gone North
Best Director	Lee Han	Innocent Witness
Grand Prize for Acting	Jung Woo-sung	Innocent Witness
Best Actor	Ju Ji-hoon	Dark Figure of Crime
Best Actress	Kim Hyang-gi	Innocent Witness
Best Supporting Actor	Yoon Kyung-ho	Intimate Strangers
Best Supporting Actress	Kim Sun-young	Mal-Mo-E: The Secret Mission
Lighting Award	Lee Tae-geun	Intimate Strangers
Best New Director	Kim Yu-seong	Uhm Bok-dong
Best New Actor	Sung Yu-bin	Last Child
Best New Actress	Park Hye-su	Swing Kids
Best New Actress	Lee Jae-in	Svaha: The Sixth Finger
Child Actor Award	Kim Si-a	Miss Baek
Popular Actor Award	Ryu Jun-yeol	Believer
Popular Actress Award	Song Ha-yoon	Intimate Strangers
Achievement Award	Ahn Sang-woo	
Achievement Award	Kim Seong-hwan	Extreme Job
Achievement Award	Lee Soon-jae	
Special Jury Award	Ji Dae-han	Melon Scent
Special Jury Award	Jin Kyung	The Witness

=== 40th (2020) ===
Category	Recipient(s)	Work(s)
Cinematography - Gold Award	Hong Kyung-pyo	Parasite
Cinematography - Silver Award	Kim Tae-kyung	The King's Letters
Cinematography - Bronze Award	Kim Hak-soo	Again, Spring
New Cinematographer Award	Lee Jung-in	Romang
Best Film	Kwak Sin-ae	Parasite
Best Director	Chung Ji-young	Black Money
Grand Prize for Acting	Song Kang-ho	Parasite
Best Actor	Jo Jin-woong	Black Money
Best Actress	Lee Ha-nee	Black Money
Best Supporting Actor	Lee Kwang-soo	Inseparable Bros
Best Supporting Actress	Kim Mi-kyung	Kim Ji-young, Born 1982
Lighting Award	Song Jae-seok	The Culprit
Best New Director	Park Noo-ri	Money
Best New Director	Kim Jun-sik	Between the Seasons
Best New Actor	Kim Sung-kyu	The Gangster, The Cop, The Devil
Best New Actor	Woo Do-hwan	The Divine Fury
Best New Actress	Kim So-hye	Moonlit Winter
Best New Actress	Yoon Hye-ri	Between the Seasons
Best New Actress	Choi Mi-kyo	Murphy and Sally's Law
Child Actor Award	Lee Go-eun	Sunkist Family
Child Actor Award	Eum Seo-young	The Sky Beneath the Lake
Popular Actor Award	Ryu Seung-ryong	Juror 8
Popular Actress Award	Lim Yoona	Exit
Achievement Award	Lee Tae-hee; Kim Gi-eop	
Special Jury Award	Minho	Battle of Jangsari
Special Jury Award	Hwang Woo-seul-hye	Sunkist Family
Special Award	Bae Jae-hyun	
Acting Achievement Award	Lee Hae-ryong	
Film Director Achievement Award	Bae Chang-ho	
Cinematographer Achievement Award	Ahn Chang-bok	
Film Development Achievement Award	Bong Joon-ho	Parasite

Past Winners by ceremony (2021 to present)

=== 41st (2021) ===
Category	Recipient(s)	Work(s)
Cinematography - Gold Award	Lee Eui-tae	The Book of Fish
Cinematography - Silver Award	Kim Byeong-jeong	Beyond That Mountain
Cinematography - Bronze Award	Son Won-ho	The Swordsman
New Cinematographer Award	Yu Il-seung	Rain and Your Story
Best Film	Kim Seong-cheol	The Book of Fish
Best Director	Lee Joon-ik	The Book of Fish
Best Actor	Sol Kyung-gu	The Book of Fish
Best Actress	Chun Woo-hee	Rain and Your Story
Best Supporting Actor	Kim Hee-won	Pawn
Best Supporting Actress	Jang Hye-jin	More Than Family
Lighting Award	Jo Gyu-young	Diva
Best New Director	Seo You-min	Recalled
Best New Actor	Park Bo-gum	Seobok
Best New Actress	Min Do-hee	The Book of Fish
Child Actor Award	Park So-yi	Pawn
Popular Actor Award	Cha Seung-won	Sinkhole
Popular Actress Award	Jung Soo-jung	More Than Family
Special Jury Award	Kim Dae-myung	Stone Skipping
Special Jury Award	Moon So-ri	Three Sisters
Independent Film New Artist Award	Kim Ki-hyun	Let's Go Together

=== 42nd (2022) ===
Category	Recipient(s)	Work(s)
Cinematography - Gold Award	Kim Tae-seong	Hansan: Rising Dragon
Cinematography - Silver Award	Kim Yoon-soo	The Lady Driver
Cinematography - Bronze Award	Choi Se-il	Air Murder
New Cinematographer Award	Yoon Ji-woon	Hommage
Best Film	Byun Sung-hyun	Kingmaker
Best Director	Park Chan-wook	Decision to Leave
Best Actor	Park Hae-il	Decision to Leave
Best Actress	Tang Wei	Decision to Leave
Best Supporting Actor	Park Ji-hwan	The Roundup
Best Supporting Actress	Park Se-wan	6/45
Lighting Award	Kim Kyung-seok	Hansan: Rising Dragon
Editing Award	Kim Sang-beom	Hunt
Best New Director	Jo Eun-ji	Perhaps Love
Best New Actor	Choi Woo-sung	Room Sharing
Best New Actress	Lee Ji-eun	Broker
Child Actor Award	Jung Hyun-joon	Special Delivery
Popular Actor Award	Ryu Seung-ryong	Perhaps Love
Popular Actress Award	Kim Hyang-gi	Hansan: Rising Dragon
Special Jury Award	Yoon Kye-sang	Spiritwalker
Special Jury Award	Kim Hye-yoon	The Girl on a Bulldozer
Acting Achievement Award	Kang Soo-yeon	
Film Director Achievement Award	Jung Jin-woo	
Cinematographer Achievement Award	Kim An-hong	
Special Achievement Award	Kim Young-shim; Kim Yo-seph; Ki Tae-hyun	
Documentary Award	Lee Il-ha	More

=== 43rd (2023) ===
Category	Recipient(s)	Work(s)
Cinematography - Gold Award	Kim Tae-kyung	The Night Owl
Cinematography - Silver Award	Jo Sang-yoon	Hero
Cinematography - Bronze Award	Kim Jung-ho	You Are Gone
New Cinematographer Award	Lee Sung-guk	Extreme Festival
Best Film	Baek Chang-ju	The Night Owl
Best Director	Ahn Tae-jin	The Night Owl
Best Actor	Ryu Jun-yeol	The Night Owl
Best Actress	Kim Seo-hyung	Greenhouse
Best Supporting Actor	Choi Moo-sung	The Night Owl
Best Supporting Actress	Lee Yoon-ji	Dream Palace
Lighting Award	Hong Seung-cheol	The Night Owl
Editing Award	Park Gok-ji	Birth
Best New Director	Lim Seong-yong	When Our Love Remains as Scent
Best New Actor	Kang Tae-joo	The Childe
Child Actor Award	Park So-yi	Switch
Popular Actor Award	Cha Tae-hyun	My Heart Puppy
Popular Actress Award	Ra Mi-ran	Honest Candidate 2
Special Jury Award	Daniel Henney	Confidential Assignment 2: International
Special Jury Award	Jeon So-nee	Soulmate
OTT Special Acting Award	Cha Joo-young	The Glory
Independent Film Special Acting Award	Go Woo-ri	A Fauna of Escapes
Scenario Achievement Award	Ji Sang-hak	
Cinematography Achievement Award	Lee Sung-seop	
Actor Achievement Award	Ahn Sung-ki	
Special Achievement Award	Heo Pil-seon	
Special Achievement Award	Kim Yo-seop	
Special Achievement Award	Ki Tae-hyun	
Korea-Vietnam Film Friendship Exchange Award	Nguyen Mai Long	
Korea-Vietnam Film Friendship Exchange Award	Nguyen Thien Quang	
Visual Effects Award	Eun Jae-hyun	Concrete Utopia
Documentary Award		A Small Garden

=== 44th (2024) ===
The 44th Golden Cinematography Awards Ceremony was successfully held on Monday, November 18, at the CG Art Hall, on the second floor of the Construction Association Building in Nonhyeon-dong. The event was hosted by the Korean Association of Cinematographers (Chairman Kim Ki-tae) and organized by HL Company.

Category	Recipient(s)	Work(s)
Cinematography - Gold Award	—N/a	—N/a
Cinematography - Silver Award	—N/a	—N/a
Cinematography - Bronze Award	Kim Dong-pil	Secret
New Cinematographer Award	Park Min-woo	Oasis
Best Film	Jang Jae-hyun	Exhuma
Best Director	Kim Jee-woon	Cobweb
Best Actor	Song Kang-ho	Cobweb
Best Actress	Jung So-min	30 Days
Best Supporting Actor	Kim Min-jae	The Roundup: Punishment
Best Supporting Actress	Yeom Hye-ran	Citizen of a Kind
Lighting Award	—N/a	—N/a
Editing Award	—N/a	—N/a
Best New Director	Yoo Jae-sun	Sleep
Best New Actor	Yoo Seon-ho	Loan Shark Boy
Best New Actress	Kim A-young	Marrying the Mafia: Returns
Child Actor Award	Park Ju-won	1980
Popular Actor Award	Lee Je-hoon	Escape
Popular Actress Award	Kim Jung-nan	Oh! Audrey
Special Jury Award	Lee Hee-joon	Handsome Guys
Special Jury Award	Kim Gyu-ri	1980
Best Acting Award - Drama Category	Kim Myung-min	Your Honor
OTT Special Acting Award	Jo Jin-woong; Lee Si-young	No Way Out: The Roulette; Sweet Home Season 2
Independent Film Special Acting Award	Ha Si-eun	Oh! Audrey
Scenario Achievement Award	Jung Ji-young	
Cinematography Achievement Award	Jin Young-ho	
Actor Achievement Award	Joo Ho-sung	
Special Achievement Award	Kim Gi-ok	
Special Achievement Award	Deok-gil	

=== 45th (2025) ===
Category	Recipient(s)	Work(s)
Cinematography - Gold Award	—N/a	—N/a
Cinematography - Silver Award	Kang Seung-gi	When the Stars Gossip
Cinematography - Bronze Award	Park Min-woo	Day 1
New Cinematographer Award	—N/a	—N/a
Best Film	Kim Hyung-joo	The Match
Best Director	Choo Chang-min	Land of Happiness
Best Actor	Jo Jung-suk	My Daughter Is a Zombie
Best Actress	Jeon Yeo-been	Dark Nuns
Best Supporting Actor	Ko Chang-seok	The Match
Best Supporting Actress	Kwak Sun-young	Lobby
Lighting Award	—N/a	—N/a
Editing Award	—N/a	—N/a
Best New Director	Cho Young-myoung	You Are the Apple of My Eye
Best New Actor	Kang Seung-ho	Officer Black Belt
Best New Actress	Moon Ye-won	Romance
Child Actor Award	Kim Si-woo	About Family
Popular Actor Award	Ahn Jae-hong	Hi-Five
Popular Actress Award	Jang Yoon-ju	One Win
Special Jury Award	Go Ah-sung	Because I Hate Korea
Best Acting Award - Drama Category	Kim Ji-hoon	The Haunted Palace
OTT Special Acting Award	Park Sung-hoon; Park Bo-young	Squid Game Season 3 Melo Movie
Independent Film Special Acting Award	Lee Sang-min	Next
Scenario Achievement Award	—N/a	—N/a
Cinematography Achievement Award	—N/a	—N/a
Actor Achievement Award	—N/a	—N/a
Special Achievement Award	Heo Eung-hoe	
Special Achievement Award	Yang Yun-ho	
Special Achievement Award	Bang Sun-jeong	

== See also ==
- List of Asian television awards
