= Yoo Il-seung =

South Korean cinematographer

- Education: Dankook University; Korea National University of Arts
- Occupation: Cinematographer
- Years active: 2006 to present

Korean name
- Hangul: 유일승
- RR: Yu Ilseung
- MR: Yu Ilsŭng

Yoo Il-seung (Korean: 유일승) is a South Korean cinematographer. He began his career in 2006 as a member of the cinematography team under Hong Kyung-pyo. He worked with Hong on films from critically acclaimed director such as Bong Joon-ho's Mother (2009), Na Hong-jin's The Wailing (2016) and Lee Chang-dong's Burning (2018).

Yoo made his feature-length debut with Park Sang-hyun's film Innocence (2020) and gained recognition for his work on Jo Jin-mo's film Waiting for Rain (2021), which earned him the Best New Cinematographer award at the Golden Cinematography Awards. His drama work includes the series Perfect Family (2024).

== Education ==
Yoo's hometown is Masan, South Korea. Yoo was drawn to cinema as a teenager, citing frequent trips to bigger city to see movies such as Shunji Iwai's Swallowtail Butterfly. He relocated to Cheonan to enroll in the film program at the Dankook University' School of Theater and Film.

== Career ==
=== Beginning ===
In 2006, during his fourth year of college, Yoo collaborated with classmate Choi Young-jun on the short films Merry Christmas and When Love Is Needed More Than Ever. Directed by Choi, Merry Christmas explores the lives of a "goose father" and a foreign worker during the Christmas season, highlighting the challenges they face while being away from their families. Shot in 35mm color, the film won the grand prize at the 2nd Korea University Film Festival, competing against 20 other finalists. Yoo received the Best Cinematography award for his work on both films. He also demonstrated his acting talent, having received a 2 million won scholarship from the Eastman Kodak Student Scholarship Program.

That same year, Yoo came across a posting seeking the youngest member for the cinematography team of the film Love Exposure, led by cinematographer Hong Kyung-pyo. He applied, was accepted, and became Hong's mentee, collaborating on several films. One notable experience was working on Bong Joon-ho's Mother, where Yoo observed Director Bong's approach to acting and his adaptive storyboards.

Following his participation in Kim Min-seok's Haunters (2010), Yoo returned to his studies at the Korea National University of Arts. He remains a member of Hong Kyung-pyo's team, working alongside critically acclaimed directors on films such as Na Hong-jin's The Wailing (2016) and Lee Chang-dong's Burning (2018). Additionally, Yoo has served as cinematographer on several short and independent films. In 2015, he won Best Cinematography at the 52nd Grand Bell Awards Short Film Festival for the short film Green Door.

=== Debut as cinematographer and the following works in films and dramas ===
In 2020, Yoo made his feature-length commercial film debut as the cinematographer for Park Sang-hyun's film Innocence. The film tells the story of a group of men in a rural village funeral hall who drink pesticide-laced makgeolli and suddenly begin to vomit. Jung-in (Shin Hye-sun), the eldest daughter and a successful lawyer in Seoul, rushes home when her mother, Hwa-ja (Bae Jong-ok), becomes the prime suspect in the ensuing chaos, prompting her quest for the truth. Innocence shifts between crime thriller, courtroom drama, and a poignant mother-daughter narrative, underscored by the vivid and precise performances of its veteran cast. The disciplined cinematography, which draws close to the actors' expressions, is a hallmark of Yoo's work in this debut.

The following year, Yoo served as cinematographer for Jo Jin-mo's film Waiting for Rain, written by Yoo Seong-hyub. Starring Kang Ha-neul and Chun Woo-hee, the film is a love story about two individuals who have yearned for each other for a long time but could not meet due to various circumstances. This work earned him the Best New Cinematographer award at the Golden Cinematography Awards.

In 2024, Yoo made his terrestrial television drama debut with the KBS2 series Perfect Family, which was directed by Japanese director Isao Yukisada. They worked on the drama with a tight schedule of 70 days. The director reportedly chose Yoo following a recommendation from Bong Joon-ho.

== Filmography ==
=== Film ===
Film(s) credit of Yoo
Year	Film	Director	Role	Notes	Ref.
2006	Merry Christmas	Choi Young-jun	Cinematographer	Short film, graduation project	
2006	When Love Is Needed More Than Ever	Choi Young-jun	Cinematographer	Short film, graduation project	
2007	Love Exposure	Lee Eun-hee	Cinematographer Team (Note: Cinematographer Hong Kyung-pyo)		
2007	M	Lee Myung-se	Cinematographer Team		
2007	Maya Gurchew	Woo Bo-yeon	Lighting		
2008	Usual Relationship	Park Hyeon-cheol	Cinematographer, Lighting		
2008	Eye for an Eye	Kwak Kyung-taek	Cinematographer Team		
2008	Dog of Cheonggyecheon	Kim Kyung-mook	Cinematographer		
2009	Mother	Bong Joon-ho	Cinematographer Team		
2009	Actresses	E J-yong	Cinematographer Team		
2009	Timeless	Ryoo Seung-wan	Cinematographer Team	Short film	
2010	71: Into the Fire	Kim Min-seok	Cinematographer Team (Note: Choi Chan-min)		
2010	Haunters	Kim Min-seok	Cinematographer Team		
2011	Always	Song Il-gon	Cinematographer Team		
2012	Choked	Kim Joong-hyun	Cinematographer Team (Note: Lee Jin-keun)		
2012	A Company Man	Im Sang-yoon	Cinematographer Team (Note: Lee Hyung-deok)		
2012	Beast Is My Middle Name	Kim Bo-ra	Cinematographer		
2012	Poker Face Girl	Kim Geon	Cinematographer		
2013	Man on the Edge	Jo Jin-kyu	Cinematographer Team (Note: Jung Ki-won)		
2013	Boomerang Family	Song Hae-sung	Cinematographer Team		
2013	Tough as Iron	Ahn Gwon-tae	Cinematographer Team		
2014	Sea Fog	Shim Sung-bo	Cinematographer Team		
2014	Man in Love	Han Dong-wook	Cinematographer Team (Note: Yu Eok)		
2014	Greed	Song Woo-jin	Cinematographer	Short film	
2014	Green Door	Bae Jun-hyun	Cinematographer	Short film	
2015	Chronicle of a Blood Merchant	Ha Jung-woo	Cinematographer Team (Note: Cinematographer So Jung-oh)		
2016	The Wailing	Na Hong-jin	Cinematographer Team		
2016	Run-Off	Kim Jong-Hyeon	Cinematographer Team		
2017	The Silence of the Dogs	Kim Kyung-mook	Cinematographer	Independent film	
2018	Burning	Lee Chang-dong	Cinematographer Team		
2020	Innocence	Park Sang-hyun	Cinematographer	Feature film debut	
2021	Waiting for Rain	Jo Jin-mo	Cinematographer		
2022	Honest Candidate 2	Jang Yu-jeong	Cinematographer		
2023	Project Silence	Kim Tae-gon	Cinematographer Team		
2025	Kaede	Isao Yukisada	Cinematographer (Note: collaborated with Kenji Maki)		

=== Series ===
Series(s) credit of Yoo
Year	Title	Director	Role	Notes	Ref.
2024	Perfect Family	Isao Yukisada	Cinematographer	KBS2 drama	

== Awards and nominations ==
Awards and nominations received by Yoo
Award	Year	Category	Nominated work	Result	Ref.
Golden Cinematography Award	2021	Best New Cinematographer	Waiting for Rain	Won	
52nd Grand Bell Awards Short Film Festival	2015	Best Cinematography	Green Door	Won	
The 2nd Korea University Film Festival	2006	Best Cinematography	Merry Christmas; When Love Is Needed More Than Ever	Won	
