= Missing: The Other Side =

2020 South Korean television series

- Promotional poster for Season 2
- Also known as: Missing
- Hangul: 미씽: 그들이 있었다
- RR: Missing: geudeuri isseotda
- MR: Missing: kŭdŭri issŏtta
- Genre: Fantasy; Mystery; Thriller
- Created by: Studio Dragon
- Written by: Ban Gi-ri; Jeong So-young
- Directed by: Min Yeon-hong
- Starring: Go Soo; Huh Joon-ho; Ahn So-hee; Ha Jun; Seo Eun-soo; Song Geon-hee
- Music by: Park Se-jun
- Country of origin: South Korea
- Original language: Korean
- No. of seasons: 2
- No. of episodes: 26

Production
- Executive producers: Jang Jeong-do; Park Je-young (CP)
- Producers: Park Mae-hee; Park Jeong-jun
- Production companies: Mays Entertainment (S1-2); doFRAME (S2)

Original release
- Network: OCN (season 1)
- Release: August 29 – October 11, 2020
- Network: tvN (season 2)
- Release: December 19, 2022 – January 31, 2023

Missing: The Other Side (Korean: 미씽: 그들이 있었다) is a 2020 South Korean television series starring Go Soo and Huh Joon-ho. It is a fantasy thriller based in a mysterious village where spirits live. It premiered on OCN from August 29 to October 11, 2020, every Saturday and Sunday at 22:50 (KST).

The second season was moved from OCN to tvN, and aired from December 19, 2022, to January 31, 2023, every Monday and Tuesday at 20:50 (KST).

It was a project of Studio Dragon, and was produced by Mays Entertainment.

== Series overview ==
Season	Episodes	Originally released			Airtime	Average viewership (in thousands)
Season	Episodes	First released	Last released	Network	Airtime	Average viewership (in thousands)
1	12	August 29, 2020	October 11, 2020	OCN	Saturday and Sunday at 22:50 (KST)	786
2	14	December 19, 2022	January 31, 2023	tvN	Monday and Tuesday at 20:50 (KST)	1041

== Synopsis ==
Kim Wook (Go Soo) uses his good looks and smooth talking to swindle people out of their money. After a mishap with some bad guys, however, he arrives in Duon Village, a place where the dead live, or people whose bodies were never found. This village is invisible to the outside world, but Wook can see these villagers. He finds himself drawn to these people and helps them solve the mystery of their deaths.

== Cast ==
=== Main ===
- Go Soo as Kim Wook

An ex-swindler who scams people who extort money from poor people. By chance, he enters Duon Village after running away from gangsters whom he saw abducting a woman.

- Huh Joon-ho as Jang Pan-seok

The secret-keeper of Duon Village. He is a living person. He lives in a shabby house near a mountain, and was the one who saved Kim Wook when the latter falls from a cliff and lands on a tree. He becomes good friends with Kim Wook, and takes care of him. He has been the seeker for the missing bodies of the villagers for 10 years. He pretends to be a dead soul when he enters the village, with only Thomas Cha knowing his and Kim Wook's true identities.

- Ahn So-hee as Lee Jong-ah

A bright civil servant leading a double life as a hacker. She is a professional when it comes to computers, and always helps Kim Wook in finding information and comes to rescue the team. She resigns from her job after Kim Nam-guk's death to take over his pawnshop.

- Ha Jun as Shin Joon-ho

A competitive detective who is restless and dedicated. He would catch the criminals assigned to him by any means. He is also looking for his fiancée, Choi Yeo-na, who goes missing after an argument.

- Seo Eun-soo as Choi Yeo-na (Season 1)

Shin Joon-ho's fiancée is an orphan. She is abducted by unknown men and her soul ends up at Duon Village, where she meets Kim Wook.

- Song Geon-hee as Thomas Cha/Cha Kwon-muk (Season 1); (Season 2: special appearance)

Foreman of Duon Village who has been there for over 100 years. In the village, he runs a café named Hawaii Café, which also serves as an entrance for the dead to enter the village.

- Lee Jung-eun as Kang Eun-sil (Season 2)

She was a captain with 30 years of experience while she was alive. Now she has become a figure with a mysterious past behind her roaring laughter as she lives in Industrial Complex 3.

- Kim Dong-hwi as Oh Il-yong (Season 2)

He is a third-year resident of an industrial complex struggling to track down his own death and lost body.

=== Supporting ===
==== Chamjoeun Pawnshop ====
- Moon Yoo-kang as Kim Nam-gook
- Kang Tae-joo as Kang Dae-seong - A public service agent at the community center where Jong-a works. He also has a part-time job at a pawnshop.

==== Duon Village ====
- Kang Mal-geum as Kim Hyeon-mi, Wook's mother
- Lee Joo-won as Park Yeong-ho
- Lee Ju-myoung as Jang-mi
- Ahn Dong-yeop as Park Beom-soo
- Lee Ki-chan as Park Byeong-eun
- Go Dong-ha as Kim Joon-soo
- Jang Sun-yool as Seo Ha-neul
- Park Hye-jin as Choi Mi-ja
- Jo Yeon-woo as Lee Eun-ji
- Lee Won-gu as Woo Il-suk

==== Blue Sunshine Orphanage ====
- Kim Jung-eun as Jo Myeong-soon
- Kang Seung-ho as Jang Myung-gyu

==== Missing Persons Squad ====
- Ji Dae-han as Baek Il-doo
- Kim Gun-ho as Lee Man-sik
- Park Ye-ni as Detective Park
- Lee Kyung-jae as Detective Lee

==== Choiseung Construction ====
- Jung Young-sook as Han Yeo-hee, chairwoman of Choiseung Construction
- Lee Yoon-jae as Lee Yong-min
- Park Joong-geun as Han Sang-gil
- Yoo Seung-il as Yoo Seung-ho
- Choi Min-ah as Kim Soo-yeon, Han Yeo-hee's deceased daughter

==== Ilgong Freezing ====
- Kim Nak-yun as Manager Wang Myung-chul
- Yoo Il-han as gangster
- Park Won-suk as gangster
- Lee Da-il as gangster

==== Village Industrial Complex 3 ====
- Kwon Ah-reum as Yang Eun-hee
- Ji Dae-han as Bake Il-do
- Lim Sun-woo as Moon Se-young
- Jung Eun-pyo as Jung Young-jin
- Choi Myung-bin as Moon Bo-ra

=== Extended ===
- Son Ji-yoon as Seo Ha-neul's mother
- Hong Yoon-jae as Ahn Jin-ho, Seo Ha-neul's stepfather
- Lee Hyo-bi as Jang Hyeon-ji, Jang Pan-seok's missing daughter
- Lee Kyo-yeop as Lee Geun-hyung, Jong-ah's hometown friend.
- Song Duk-ho as Jo Jung-sik
- Cho Eun-sol as Park Young-joon
- Lee Deok-hee as Kim Myeong-ja
- Oh Yoon-hong as Kim Gun-joo
- Kim Tae-yeon as Alice
- Kwon Hyuk as Lee Tae-hyun (Season 2)
- Park Sang-hoon as Min Seung-jae
- Lee Ga-yeon as Min Ye-won
- Kim Se-dong as Lee Soo-ok
- Oh Yu-na as Choi Jeong-ah
- Nam Hyun-woo as Go Sang-cheol
- Jung Yoon-jae as Kim Pil-joong
- Kim Seo-heon as Choi Ha-yoon
- Yoo Il-han as Jang Do-ri
- Moon Ji-won as Ahn Hye-joo
- Lee Cheon-moo as Lee Young-rim
- Go Eun-young as Oh Yoo-jung
- Kim Gun-ho as Lee Man-sik
- Jae Han as Baek Il-do

=== Special appearance ===
- Yim Si-wan as Mysterious man

== Viewership ==
Missing: The Other Side : South Korea viewers per episode (thousands)

Season	Episode number														Average
Season	1	2	3	4	5	6	7	8	9	10	11	12	13	14	Average
1	440	578	815	956	897	987	772	954	913	927	922	1257	–		786
2	890	1055	934	1042	1012	1027	995	1053	1019	1107	941	1013	1126	1361	1041

Source: Audience measurement performed nationwide by Nielsen Korea.

=== Season 1 ===
Average TV viewership ratings
Ep.	Original broadcast date	Average audience share (Nielsen Korea)	
Ep.	Original broadcast date	Nationwide	Seoul
1	August 29, 2020	1.657%	N/A
2	August 30, 2020	2.510%	2.623%
3	September 5, 2020	3.003%	3.573%
4	September 6, 2020	3.490%	3.616%
5	September 12, 2020	3.290%	3.683%
6	September 13, 2020	3.757%	3.866%
7	September 26, 2020	2.992%	2.890%
8	September 27, 2020	3.847%	3.852%
9	October 3, 2020	3.153%	3.241%
10	October 4, 2020	3.525%	3.483%
11	October 10, 2020	3.403%	3.831%
12	October 11, 2020	4.811%	4.508%
Average		3.287%	— (Note: Due to some ratings not recorded, the exact average rating is unknown.)
In the table above, the blue numbers represent the lowest ratings and the red numbers represent the highest ratings.; N/A denotes that the rating is not known.; This drama aired on a cable channel/pay TV which normally has a relatively smaller audience compared to free-to-air TV/public broadcasters (KBS, SBS, MBC and EBS).

=== Season 2 ===
Average TV viewership ratings
Ep.	Original broadcast date	Average audience share (Nielsen Korea)	
Ep.	Original broadcast date	Nationwide	Seoul
1	December 19, 2022	3.735% (1st)	4.246% (1st)
2	December 20, 2022	4.073% (1st)	4.023% (2nd)
3	December 26, 2022	4.399% (1st)	5.130% (1st)
4	December 27, 2022	4.544% (1st)	4.848% (1st)
5	January 2, 2023	4.667% (1st)	5.326% (1st)
6	January 3, 2023	4.443% (1st)	5.054% (1st)
7	January 9, 2023	4.421% (1st)	5.163% (1st)
8	January 10, 2023	4.454% (1st)	4.538% (1st)
9	January 16, 2023	4.265% (1st)	4.576% (1st)
10	January 17, 2023	4.592% (1st)	4.920% (1st)
11	January 23, 2023	3.783% (1st)	3.877% (1st)
12	January 24, 2023	3.975% (1st)	3.809% (1st)
13	January 30, 2023	4.914% (1st)	5.282% (1st)
14	January 31, 2023	5.902% (1st)	6.459% (1st)
Average		4.441%	4.804%
In the table above, the blue numbers represent the lowest ratings and the red numbers represent the highest ratings.; This drama airs on a cable channel/pay TV which normally has a relatively smaller audience compared to free-to-air TV/public broadcasters (KBS, SBS, MBC and EBS).
