= Perfect Family =

2024 South Korean television series

- Promotional poster
- Hangul: 완벽한 가족
- RR: Wanbyeokhan gajok
- MR: Wanbyŏkhan kajok
- Genre: Family; Mystery
- Based on: Perfect Family by: Nyangpa; Joo-eun
- Written by: Choi Sung-geol
- Directed by: Isao Yukisada
- Starring: Park Ju-hyun; Yoon Se-ah; Kim Byung-chul
- Music by: Park Geon-won; Choi Jae-sun
- Country of origin: South Korea
- Original language: Korean
- No. of episodes: 12

Production
- Executive producer: Kim Shin-il
- Producers: Lee ho; Jo Yoon-jung; Seo Joo-wan
- Cinematography: Yoo Il-seung
- Production company: Victory Contents
- Budget: ₩14 billion

Original release
- Network: KBS2
- Release: August 14 – September 19, 2024

Perfect Family (Korean: 완벽한 가족) is a 2024 South Korean television series based on the webtoon of the same title by Nyangpa and Joo-eun, which was serialized on Naver in 2020–2021. Directed by Isao Yukisada, and starring Park Ju-hyun, Yoon Se-ah, and Kim Byung-chul. It aired on KBS2 from August 14 to September 19, 2024, every Wednesday and Thursday at 21:50 (KST). It is also available for streaming on Wavve in South Korea, and on Viki and Viu in selected regions.

== Synopsis ==
Perfect Family depicts the story of Choi Seon-hee's family, who seem happy and perfect to everyone, but started to doubt each other increasingly after the murder of Park Kyung-ho, who is a friend of Seon-hee.

== Cast and characters ==
=== Main ===
- Park Ju-hyun as Choi Seon-hee

Eun-joo and Jin-hyuk's adopted daughter.

- Yoon Se-ah as Ha Eun-joo

A housewife.

- Kim Byung-chul as Choi Jin-hyuk

A lawyer.

=== Supporting ===
- Kim Young-dae as Park Kyung-ho

Seon-hee's friend who has had a crush on her for a long time.

- Lee Si-woo as Ji Hyun-woo

Seon hee's friend, who has a crush on her and helps her all the time.

- Choi Ye-bin as Lee Soo-yeon

Seon-hee's childhood friend. The two met when they were in an orphanage.

- Yoon Sang-hyun as Choi Hyun-min

The mysterious man who pretended to be Jin-hyuk's cousin and Seon hee's uncle

- Kim Do-hyun as Shin Dong-ho

Homicide detective who was assigned to investigate Kyung-ho's case.

- Bae Woo-jin as a homicide detective

=== Special appearance ===
- Kim Myung-soo as Lee Seong-woo

Homicide detective who was assigned to investigate Kyung-ho's case and Dong ho's minions

== Release ==
The series was scheduled to air in the first half of 2024 on MBN. On June 26, 2024, it was announced that it would air instead on KBS2 on August 14, 2024, and would be scheduled as a Wednesday and Thursday drama, marking its revival after two years. It is also available to stream on Wavve, Viki and Viu.

== Viewership ==
Perfect Family : South Korea viewers per episode (thousands)

Season	Episode number											
Season	1	2	3	4	5	6	7	8	9	10	11	12
1	N/A	N/A	466	N/A	424	N/A	421	N/A	496	475	N/A	N/A

Source: Audience measurement performed nationwide by Nielsen Korea.

Average TV viewership ratings
Ep.	Original broadcast date	Average audience share	
Ep.	Original broadcast date	Nielsen Korea	
Ep.	Original broadcast date	Nationwide	Seoul
1	August 14, 2024	2.6% (21st)	2.2% (20th)
2	August 15, 2024	2.5% (27th)	N/A
3	August 21, 2024	3.0% (18th)	2.9% (17th)
4	August 22, 2024	2.3% (28th)	N/A
5	August 28, 2024	2.7% (17th)	2.6% (16th)
6	August 29, 2024	2.7% (17th)	N/A
7	September 4, 2024	2.7% (17th)	2.4% (20th)
8	September 5, 2024	2.6% (19th)	N/A
9	September 11, 2024	2.9% (17th)	2.6% (19th)
10	September 12, 2024	2.8% (20th)	2.6% (20th)
11	September 18, 2024	1.8% (38th)	N/A
12	September 19, 2024	3.1% (18th)	N/A
Average		2.6%	— (Note: Due to multiple unpublished ratings, the exact average rating is unknown.)
In the table above, the blue numbers represent the lowest ratings and the red numbers represent the highest ratings.; N/A denotes ratings that were not published.
