= Waiting for Rain =

South Korean romance film

- Theatrical release poster
- Hangul: 비와 당신의 이야기
- RR: Biwa dangsinui iyagi
- MR: Piwa tangsinŭi iyagi
- Directed by: Jo Jin-mo
- Screenplay by: Yoo Seong-hyub
- Produced by: Hwang Geun-ha
- Starring: Kang Ha-neul; Chun Woo-hee
- Cinematography: Yoo Il-seung
- Music by: Kim Joon-seok
- Production companies: Columbia Pictures; Kidari Ent; AZIT Pictures
- Distributed by: Sony Pictures Entertainment Korea
- Release date: April 28, 2021 (South Korea)
- Running time: 117 minutes
- Country: South Korea
- Language: Korean
- Box office: US$3.2 million

Waiting for Rain (Korean: 비와 당신의 이야기; lit. 'Rain and Your Story') is a 2021 South Korean romantic drama film directed by Jo Jin-mo and written by Yoo Seong-hyub. The film starring Kang Ha-neul and Chun Woo-hee, is a love story between a man and a woman who have yearned for each other for a long time but could not meet due to certain circumstances.

Waiting for Rain was released in South Korea on April 28, 2021.

== Synopsis ==
Waiting for Rain follows the romance between Young-ho (Kang Ha-neul) and So-hee (Chun Woo-hee). The two become each other's sources of comfort through the connection of a chance letter and make the unlikely promise of meeting up on a rainy December 31. The movie has an "analog" vibe through its depiction of the exchange of handwritten letters rather than phone calls or text messages.

== Cast ==
- Kang Ha-neul as Park Young-ho, a young student taking his second gap year
- Chun Woo-hee as Gong So-hee, a woman who receives the letter in place of her older sister So-yeon
  - Choi Myung-bin as Young Gong So-hee
- Lee Seol as Gong So-yeon, So-hee's older sister
- Kang Young-seok as Bookworm, is a man who likes books better than people
- Lim Ju-hwan as Park Young-hwan, Young-ho's older brother
- Lee Yang-hee as Young-ho's father
- Lee Hang-na as So-hee's mother
- Ryu Hye-rin as Assistant teacher
- Go Geon-han as Jong-gook
- Kang So-ra as Soo-jin, Young-ho's motive for re-study

== Production ==
On December 12, 2019, it was reported that Kang Ha-neul and Chun Woo-hee received an offer to appear in the film and both were accepted.

Filming began in March 2020. Filming was completed in July 2020.

== Release ==
Waiting for Rain was released in South Korea on April 28, 2021. It was later released in the United States on April 30, 2021, and in Taiwan on May 7, 2021.

== Reception ==
The film was released on April 28, 2021, on 952 screens. It was the number 1 place at the Korean box office, on the opening day of its release, collecting 29,853 audiences with a cumulative audience of 31,400 including its premiere. It maintained its number 1 spot on its opening weekend with a total audience of 122,261 from April 30 to May 2, 2021, therefore, recording a total of 174,742 admissions. On May 10, two weeks after its release, it reached the 300,000 admissions mark garnering a cumulative audience of 304,780.
