= Kopino =

Term for mixed Korean-Filipino people

Kopino (Korean: 코피노), or Korinoy in Filipino slang (a combination of "Korean" and "Pinoy"), is a term referring to a person of mixed Korean and Filipino descent.

== Background ==
According to a Filipino delegate to the 2005 ECPAT international conference, when the fathers of Kopinos return to South Korea, most of them stop contacting their children in the Philippines and no longer provide any form of support. The responsibility then falls on the Filipina mother to raise the child herself. The Philippines is a strongly Catholic nation, thus alternatives such as abortion and the use of contraceptives are stigmatised. As a result, Kopino children are often raised in single-parent households, without any contact with their Korean fathers. This problem is a consequence of sex tourism in the Philippines by Korean men, specifically within areas such as Angeles City. Since the fathers are not married to the mothers, the children are unable to obtain South Korean citizenship. As recently as 2003, Kopinos were believed to number fewer than 1,000; another 9,000 were born from 2003 to 2008. In response, South Korean NGOs such as the Daejeon Migrant Workers Support Center, alongside locally established NGOs like the Kopino Children Center, have begun to establish branch offices in the Philippines to provide social services to Kopino children and their mothers.

There are also Filipino Amerasians, Japinos, and Sinopinos in the Philippines.

== Population ==
In 2008, there were approximately 10,000 Kopinos, a tenfold increase since five years before.

The Mixed Filipino Heritage Act of 2020 estimated there were 30,000 Kopinos in the Philippines.

In 2025, it was estimated that there were approximately 50,000 Kopinos.

== Profile of Kopino parents ==
=== Korean fathers ===
According to a 2016 investigative report by The Sungkyun Times, one of the main causal factors of the Kopino phenomenon is Korean men, 90% of whom were students in their twenties, deceiving Filipino women about their intentions to have a future together. The South Korean television network MBC reported that on the island of Cebu, "most of the Korean men who solicit prostitution don't want to use a condom, causing prostitutes to get pregnant with their babies". ECPAT Korea classified the fathers of Kopinos into three broad categories: young men who went to the Philippines for the purpose of learning English, middle-aged men who travelled for business, and men who visited the Philippines in order to find prostitutes.

=== Filipino mothers ===
About 80% of Filipinos are Catholic, a religion that discourages the use of contraceptives and abortion, which contributes significantly to the birth of Kopino children. According to the 2016 investigative report, 90% of the women interviewed worked as English teachers or in other professions, not in the sex trade. However, according to MBC, "the majority of Kopinos [in Cebu] are born from hostess bars".

== Response ==
=== Website to find Kopino fathers ===
In 2015, a Korean man created a website, called KopinoFather, with pictures of Korean fathers, obtained from Filipina mothers, who had abandoned their Kopino children, for the purpose of locating them and holding them accountable. He also created a civic group, called We Love Kopino, through which Filipina mothers could submit pictures of the absentee fathers. The project stirred up some controversy due to a perceived invasion of privacy of the men, whose identities were revealed on the website.

=== Advocacy for government intervention ===
Some advocates, including Han Moon-gi, chairman of the Korea Kopino Association, have suggested that the South Korean government should intervene in the interest of Kopinos, similarly as it had done in the past for Japinos, by granting them citizenship despite having been born out of wedlock.

=== Child support rulings ===
In 2014, a Korean man was ordered to pay child support in a South Korean court ruling involving a Kopino child. The South Korean government paid 10,000,000 won to obtain the DNA of the two Kopino sons tested, and the Korean man was forced to provide a DNA sample as well, under threat of legal penalties. After being found to be the father, the man had to pay 300,000 won every month as child support.

A similar paternity ruling involving a Kopino child took place on 28 May 2015, with the absentee father being ordered to pay 500,000 won every month for each of his two Kopino sons until they reach adulthood, as an additional 20,000,000 won in back child support.

=== 2017 book ===
In 2017, a group of seven students from Chonbuk National University published a book on the Kopino issue, titled I'll Keep Watching and Looking After You.

== Lives of Kopinos ==
As of 2009, Kopinos without a legal father could not enroll in school in the Philippines. In addition, they were discriminated against by employers. Due to these social barriers, many Kopinos end up working within the sex trade or get involved in criminal activity.

== In popular culture ==
In the 2014 KBS1 drama You Are the Only One, a Kopino known as Verillio Lee Nam-soon (portrayed by Kim Min-kyo) arrives in Seoul from Iloilo in search of his Korean birth father.

== See also ==
- Prostitution in South Korea
- KoreKorea, girls in Kiribati who are paid for sex by Korean fishermen
- Lai Đại Hàn, people born to Vietnamese mothers and Korean soldiers during the Vietnam War
