= List of flag bearers for Mali at the Olympics =

Mali at the Olympics
- IOC code: MLI
- NOC: Comité National Olympique et Sportif du Mali
- Medals: Gold 0 Silver 0 Bronze 0 Total 0

Summer appearances
- 1964; 1968; 1972; 1976; 1980; 1984; 1988; 1992; 1996; 2000; 2004; 2008; 2012; 2016; 2020; 2024

This is a list of flag bearers who have represented Mali at the Olympics.

Flag bearers carry the national flag of their country at the opening ceremony of the Olympic Games.

#	Event year	Season	Flag bearer	Sport
1	1964	Summer		
2	1968	Summer		
3	1972	Summer	Namakoro Niaré	Athletics
4	1980	Summer		
5	1984	Summer	Karamoke Kory Konte	Official
6	1988	Summer	Mamadou Keita	Judo
7	1992	Summer		
8	1996	Summer	Monique Ross	Official
9	2000	Summer	Brahima Guindo	Judo
10	2004	Summer	Kadiatou Camara	Athletics
11	2008	Summer	Daba Modibo Keita	Taekwondo
12	2012	Summer	Rahamatou Drame	Athletics
13	2016	Summer	Djénébou Danté	Athletics
14	2020	Summer	Seydou Fofana	Taekwondo
15	2024	Summer	Alexien Kouma	Swimming
15	2024	Summer	Marine Camara	Boxing

== See also ==
- Mali at the Olympics
