= 2011 World Taekwondo Championships – Men's heavyweight =

Taekwondo competition

Men's heavyweight at the 2011 World Championships
- Venue: Gyeongju Indoor Stadium
- Dates: 6 May 2011
- Competitors: 49 from 49 nations

Medalists
gold medal	Jo Chol-ho	South Korea
silver medal	Akmal Irgashev	Uzbekistan
bronze medal	Kourosh Rajoli	Iran
bronze medal	Andreas Stylianou	Cyprus

The Men's heavyweight is a competition featured at the 2011 World Taekwondo Championships, and was held at the Gyeongju Gymnasium in Gyeongju, South Korea on May 6. Heavyweights were limited to a minimum of 87 kilograms in body mass.

== Results ==
Legend

- DQ — Won by disqualification
- K — Won by knockout

=== Finals ===
Semifinals		Final
Kourosh Rajoli (IRI)	5
Jo Chol-ho (KOR)	6	Jo Chol-ho (KOR)	4
Akmal Irgashev (UZB)	10	Akmal Irgashev (UZB)	0
Andreas Stylianou (CYP)	4

=== Top half ===
==== Section 1 ====
Round of 64
~~Juan Díaz (VEN)~~	DQ
~~Wisam Sattar (IRQ)~~	DQ
Aydin Bahmalov (AZE)	DQ
~~Elias El-Hidari (LIB)~~
Matthew Beach (NZL)	0
Kourosh Rajoli (IRI)	12
Chika Chukwumerije (NGR)	9
Ferry Greevink (NED)	2
Ali Sarı (TUR)	6
Abdulqader Al-Adhami (QAT)	5

Round of 32
Leonardo Basile (ITA)
Bye
Aydin Bahmalov (AZE)	2
Kourosh Rajoli (IRI)	15
Ulvi Kaya (GER)	3
Chika Chukwumerije (NGR)	2
Ali Sarı (TUR)	4
Vanja Babić (SRB)	5

Round of 16
Leonardo Basile (ITA)	0
Kourosh Rajoli (IRI)	3
Ulvi Kaya (GER)	1
Vanja Babić (SRB)	1

Quarterfinals
Kourosh Rajoli (IRI)	8
Ulvi Kaya (GER)	5

==== Section 2 ====
Round of 64
Marvin Sellas (PUR)	DQ
~~Osman Herrera (HON)~~
Mahama Cho (GBR)	DQ
~~Víctor Moreira (ECU)~~
Oleksandr Cherkun (UKR)	DQ
~~Edson Breedy (TRI)~~
Oleg Kuznetsov (RUS)	4
Stephen Lambdin (USA)	7

Round of 32
Abdelkader Zrouri (MAR)	7
Marvin Sellas (PUR)	1
Mahama Cho (GBR)	3
Mohammad Ayman (JOR)	9
Jo Chol-ho (KOR)	8
Oleksandr Cherkun (UKR)	7
Stephen Lambdin (USA)	6
Salvador Pérez (MEX)	2

Round of 16
Abdelkader Zrouri (MAR)	3
Mohammad Ayman (JOR)	5
Jo Chol-ho (KOR)	6
Stephen Lambdin (USA)	0

Quarterfinals
Mohammad Ayman (JOR)	3
Jo Chol-ho (KOR)	5

=== Bottom half ===
==== Section 3 ====
Round of 64
Liu Xiaobo (CHN)	DQ
~~Firmin Zokou (CIV)~~
Ioseb Osidze (GEO)	DQ
~~Robelis Despaigne (CUB)~~
Adam Underwood (AUS)	1
Teemu Heino (FIN)	9
Li Siu Hong (HKG)	1
Karim Alaa (EGY)	5

Round of 32
Mickaël Borot (FRA)	1
Liu Xiaobo (CHN)	2
Ioseb Osidze (GEO)	DQ
~~Jane Stojčevski (MKD)~~
Zakaria Asidah (DEN)	1
Teemu Heino (FIN)	2
Karim Alaa (EGY)	1
Akmal Irgashev (UZB)	13

Round of 16
Liu Xiaobo (CHN)	6
Ioseb Osidze (GEO)	1
Teemu Heino (FIN)	4
Akmal Irgashev (UZB)	5

Quarterfinals
Liu Xiaobo (CHN)	5
Akmal Irgashev (UZB)	8

==== Section 4 ====
Round of 64
Kaino Thomsen (SAM)	DQ
~~Pierre Nyok Nyok (CMR)~~
Martín Sio (ARG)	6
Jaume Martínez (ESP)	5
~~Cristian Salcedo (COL)~~
Andreas Stylianou (CYP)	DQ
Vedran Golec (CRO)	6
Sandeep Kundu (IND)	5

Round of 32
Alexandros Nikolaidis (GRE)	8
Kaino Thomsen (SAM)	0
Martín Sio (ARG)	1
Michael Kitchke (CAN)	2
Chung I-han (TPE)	4
Andreas Stylianou (CYP)	6
Vedran Golec (CRO)	5
Kristopher Moitland (CRC)	3

Round of 16
Alexandros Nikolaidis (GRE)	4
Michael Kitchke (CAN)	4^{K}
Andreas Stylianou (CYP)	8
Vedran Golec (CRO)	7

Quarterfinals
Michael Kitchke (CAN)	3
Andreas Stylianou (CYP)	4
