= 2009 World Taekwondo Championships – Men's heavyweight =

Taekwondo competition

Men's heavyweight at the 2009 World Championships
- Venue: Ballerup Super Arena
- Dates: 14 October 2009
- Competitors: 53 from 53 nations

Medalists
| gold medal | Daba Modibo Keïta | Mali |
| silver medal | Nam Yun-bae | South Korea |
| bronze medal | Hossein Tajik | Iran |
| bronze medal | Arman Chilmanov | Kazakhstan |

The Men's Heavyweight competition was a class featured at the 2009 World Taekwondo Championships, and was held at the Ballerup Super Arena in Copenhagen, Denmark on October 14. Heavyweights were over of 87 kilograms in body mass.

== Results ==
Legend

- DQ — Won by disqualification

=== Finals ===
| Semifinals | | Final |
| Nam Yun-bae (KOR) | 2 |
| Hossein Tajik (IRI) | 1 | Nam Yun-bae (KOR) | 4 |
| Arman Chilmanov (KAZ) | 3 | Daba Modibo Keïta (MLI) | 5 |
| Daba Modibo Keïta (MLI) | 7 |

=== Top half ===
==== Section 1 ====
Round of 64
~~Salam Qidan (IRQ)~~
Abdulqader Al-Adhami (QAT) | DQ
Víctor Feliz (DOM) | 9
Pewee Russian (LBR) | 2
Sorn Elit (CAM) | 4
Mile Vidović (SRB) | 5
Sergio Hoyos (COL) | 3
Elias El-Hidari (LIB) | 3
Adrián Puello (PUR) | 1
Nam Yun-bae (KOR) | 3

Round of 32
Alexandros Nikolaidis (GRE) | 4
Abdulqader Al-Adhami (QAT) | 1
Víctor Feliz (DOM) | 2
Mille Vidović (SRB) | 2
Akmal Irgashev (UZB) | 1
Elias El-Hidari (LIB) | 0
Nam Yun-bae (KOR) | 3
Kristopher Moitland (CRC) | 2

Round of 16
Alexandros Nikolaidis (GRE) | 2
Víctor Feliz (DOM) | 1
Akmal Irgashev (UZB) | 0
Nam Yun-bae (KOR) | 2

Quarterfinals
Alexandros Nikolaidis (GRE) | 1
Nam Yun-bae (KOR) | 1

==== Section 2 ====
Round of 64
Vugar Majidov (AZE) | 1
Alexander Briones (PHI) | 0
Pierre Nyok Nyok (CMR) | 6
Lu Kuan-hsun (TPE) | 1
~~John Ireri (KEN)~~
Jason Neville (USA) | DQ
Salvador Pérez (MEX) | 2
Andreas Stylianou (CYP) | 1
Yahor Slonski (BLR) | 4
Mikel Fernández (ESP) | 3
Vedran Golec (CRO) | 1
Oleksandr Cherkun (UKR) | 0

Round of 32
Hossein Tajik (IRI) | 2
Vugar Majidov (AZE) | 1
Pierre Nyok Nyok (CMR) | 0
Jason Neville (USA) | 4
Salvador Pérez (MEX) | 5
Yahor Slonski (BLR) | 2
Vedran Golec (CRO) | 2
Soner Pınarcık (TUR) | 4

Round of 16
Hossein Tajik (IRI) | 3
Jason Neville (USA) | 2
Salvador Pérez (MEX) | 6
Soner Pınarcık (TUR) | 1

Quarterfinals
Hossein Tajik (IRI) | 3
Salvador Pérez (MEX) | 1

=== Bottom half ===
==== Section 3 ====
Round of 64
Matthew Beach (NZL) | 10
Juan Díaz (VEN) | 2
Leonardo Santos (BRA) | 0
Teemu Heino (FIN) | 2
Abdelkader Zrouri (MAR) | 3
Liu Xiaobo (CHN) | 0
~~Badreddin Khalfuni (LBA)~~
Haukur Guðmundsson (ISL) | DQ
Aramoa Suiga (SAM) | DQ
Đinh Quang Đức (VIE)

Round of 32
Arman Chilmanov (KAZ) | 2
Matthew Beach (NZL) | 1
Teemu Heino (FIN) | 4
Abdelkader Zrouri (MAR) | 3
Ulvi Kaya (GER) | 3
Haukur Guðmundsson (ISL) | 0
Aramoa Suiga (SAM) | 0
Mickaël Borot (FRA) | 9

Round of 16
Arman Chilmanov (KAZ) | 6
Teemu Heino (FIN) | 5
Ulvi Kaya (GER) | 3
Mickaël Borot (FRA) | 5

Quarterfinals
Arman Chilmanov (KAZ) | 5
Mickaël Borot (FRA) | 4

==== Section 4 ====
Round of 64
Byron Coleborne (AUS) | 4
Gerald Ezidiegwu (NGR) | 3
Leonardo Basile (ITA) | 3
Daba Modibo Keïta (MLI) | 5
Zakaria Asidah (DEN) | 4
Martín Sio (ARG) | 1
~~Jaber Al-Atwan (KUW)~~
Robelis Despaigne (CUB) | DQ
Farid Guelmami (ALG) | 14
Veera Basavaiah (IND) | 3

Round of 32
Roman Kuznetsov (RUS) | 6
Byron Coleborne (AUS) | 1
Daba Modibo Keïta (MLI) | 5
Michael Kitschke (CAN) | 1
Zakaria Asidah (DEN) | 1
Robelis Despaigne (CUB) | 2
Farid Guelmami (ALG) | 2
Karim Koné (CIV) | 6

Round of 16
Roman Kuznetsov (RUS) | 6
Daba Modibo Keïta (MLI) | 9
Robelis Despaigne (CUB) | 2
Karim Koné (CIV) | 1

Quarterfinals
Daba Modibo Keïta (MLI) | 4
Robelis Despaigne (CUB) | 2
