= Taekwondo at the 2008 Summer Olympics – Men's +80 kg =

Taekwondo competition

Men's +80 kg at the Games of the XXIX Olympiad
- Venue: Beijing Science and Technology University Gymnasium
- Date: 23 August 2008
- Competitors: 16 from 16 nations

Medalists
1st place, gold medalist(s)		Cha Dong-Min	South Korea
2nd place, silver medalist(s)		Alexandros Nikolaidis	Greece
3rd place, bronze medalist(s)		Chika Chukwumerije	Nigeria
3rd place, bronze medalist(s)		Arman Chilmanov	Kazakhstan

The men's +80 kg competition in taekwondo at the 2008 Summer Olympics in Beijing took place on August 23 at the Beijing Science and Technology University Gymnasium.

Cuban competitor Ángel Valodia Matos was leading 3-2 in the bronze medal bout against Kazakhstan's Arman Chilmanov, until he apparently suffered a broken toe and was subsequently ruled to have retired after the allotted one minute of injury time expired. After a brief argument, Matos kicked referee Chakir Chelbat in the face, punched a judge in the arm and spat on the floor of the arena before he and his coach, Leudin González, who had criticized the referee's ruling as too strict and also accused Kazakhstan of bribing officials, were escorted out by security.

The World Taekwondo Federation (WTF) subsequently banned Matos and González from WTF sanctioned events for life, and ordered Matos's results from the Beijing Games to be deleted from the records. As Chelbat received a cut lip that required seven stitches, the WTF also considered taking legal action against the Cuban team.

== Competition format ==
The main bracket consisted of a single elimination tournament, culminating in the gold medal match. Two bronze medals were awarded at the taekwondo competitions. A repechage was used to determine the bronze medal winners. Every competitor who lost to one of the two finalists competed in the repechage, another single-elimination competition. Each semifinal loser faced the last remaining repechage competitor from the opposite half of the bracket in a bronze medal match.

== Schedule ==
All times are China standard time (UTC+8)

Date	Time	Round
Saturday, 23 August 2008	11:00; 16:00; 17:30; 20:30	Preliminary Round; Quarterfinals; Semifinals; Final

== Qualifying Athletes ==
Athlete	Country
Chika Chukwumerije	Nigeria
Nguyen Van Hung	Vietnam
Mickael Borot	France
Daba Modibo Keita	Mali
Alexandros Nikolaidis	Greece
Arman Chilmanov	Kazakhstan
Abdelkader Zrouri	Morocco
Juan Díaz	Venezuela
Matthew Beach	New Zealand
Liu Xiaobo	China
Leonardo Basile	Italy
Ángel Matos	Cuba
Akmal Irgashev	Uzbekistan
Jon Garcia	Spain
Kristopher Moitland	Costa Rica
Cha Dong-Min	South Korea

== Results ==
Legend

- PTG — Won by points gap
- SUP — Won by superiority
- OT — Won on over time (Golden Point)

=== Main bracket ===
Preliminary round
1	Chika Chukwumerije (NGR)	3
16	Nguyen Van Hung (VIE)	1
8	Mickael Borot (FRA)	5
9	Daba Modibo Keita (MLI)	6
5	Alexandros Nikolaidis (GRE)	4
12	Arman Chilmanov (KAZ)	3
4	Abdelkader Zrouri (MAR)	KO
13	Juan Díaz (VEN)	1:40-2
6	Matthew Beach (NZL)	1
11	Liu Xiaobo (CHN)	4
3	Leonardo Basile (ITA)	1
14	Ángel Matos (CUB)	3
7	Akmal Irgashev (UZB)	11
10	Jon Garcia (ESP)	10
2	Kristopher Moitland (CRC)	−2
15	Cha Dong-Min (KOR)	1

Quarterfinals
Chika Chukwumerije (NGR)	1
Daba Modibo Keita (MLI)	0
Alexandros Nikolaidis (GRE)	5
Abdelkader Zrouri (MAR)	4
Liu Xiaobo (CHN)	1
Ángel Matos (CUB)	2
Akmal Irgashev (UZB)	0
Cha Dong-Min (KOR)	2

Semifinals
Chika Chukwumerije (NGR)	2
Alexandros Nikolaidis (GRE)	3
Ángel Matos (CUB)	0
Cha Dong-Min (KOR)	1

Gold medal match
Alexandros Nikolaidis (GRE)	4
Cha Dong-Min (KOR)	5

=== Repechage ===
Round 1
Akmal Irgashev (UZB)	6
Kristopher Moitland (CRC)	5
Arman Chilmanov (KAZ)
Abdelkader Zrouri (MAR)	WO

Bronze medal match
Akmal Irgashev (UZB)	3
Chika Chukwumerije (NGR)	4
Ángel Matos (CUB)	DSQ
Arman Chilmanov (KAZ)
