= Julian Rojas =

Colombian taekwondo practitioner

Personal information
- Full name: Julián Alberto Rojas Rivera
- Nationality: Colombia
- Born: 11 May 1978 (age 48) La Montañita, Caquetá, Colombia
- Height: 1.84 m (6 ft 1/2 in)
- Weight: 85 kg (187 lb)

Sport
- Sport: Taekwondo
- Event: +80 kg

Julián Alberto Rojas Rivera (born 11 May 1978 in La Montañita, Caquetá) is a Colombian taekwondo practitioner, who attained a seventh-place finish in the men's heavyweight category at the 2004 Summer Olympics.

Rojas qualified for the Colombian squad in the men's heavyweight class (+80 kg) at the 2004 Summer Olympics in Athens, by defeating Costa Rica's Kristopher Moitland for a top spot and granting a berth from the Pan American Olympic Qualifying Tournament in Querétaro, Mexico. He lost his opening match by a 3–7 margin to Greek crowd favorite and two-meter-tall fighter Alexandros Nikolaidis, but redeemed himself to compete for the Olympic bronze medal through the repechage, following Nikolaidis' progress towards the final. In the repechage, Rojas subsided his Olympic medal chance for Colombia by losing the first playoff 2–6 to tall Moroccan player Abdelkader Zrouri, relegating him to seventh position.
