= Mali at the 2012 Summer Olympics =

- IOC code: MLI
- NOC: Comité National Olympique et Sportif du Mali

in London
- Competitors: 6 in 4 sports
- Flag bearer: Rahamatou Drame
- Medals: Gold 0 Silver 0 Bronze 0 Total 0

Summer Olympics appearances (overview)
- 1964; 1968; 1972; 1976; 1980; 1984; 1988; 1992; 1996; 2000; 2004; 2008; 2012; 2016; 2020; 2024

Mali competed at the 2012 Summer Olympics held in London, from 27 July to 12 August 2012. This was the nation's 12th appearance at the Olympics, although not consecutive.

Mali sent its smallest delegation to the Games since the 2000 Summer Olympics in Sydney, New South Wales, Australia. Six Malian athletes, four men and two women, qualified to compete in four sports.

Taekwondo jin and double-time world heavyweight champion Daba Modibo Keita missed out on winning a medal, which would have been Mail's first Olympic medal, after he withdrew from the bronze medal bout because of the injuries he had sustained.

== Background ==
Mali made their Olympic debut at the 1964 Summer Olympics in Tokyo, Japan and they had appeared at every Summer Olympics since. The 2012 Summer Olympics in London, England, United Kingdom marked Mali's 12th appearance at a Summer Olympics and the six athletes present was their smallest delegation since the 2000 Summer Olympics in Sydney, New South Wales, Australia.

== Competitors ==
In total, six athletes represented Mali at the 2012 Summer Olympics in London, England, United Kingdom across four different sports.

Sport	Men	Women	Total
Athletics	1	1	2
Judo	1	0	1
Swimming	1	1	2
Taekwondo	1	0	1
Total	4	2	6

== Athletics ==
In total, two Malian athletes participated in the athletics events – Moussa Camarao in the men's 800 m and Rahamatou Drame in the women's 100 m hurdles.

Men

Athlete	Event	Heat		Semifinal		Final	
Athlete	Event	Result	Rank	Result	Rank	Result	Rank
Moussa Camarao	800 m	1:51.36	6	Did not advance			

Women

Athlete	Event	Heat		Semifinal		Final	
Athlete	Event	Result	Rank	Result	Rank	Result	Rank
Rahamatou Drame	100 m hurdles	DSQ		Did not advance			

== Judo ==
In total, one Malian athlete participated in the judo events – Oumar Koné in the men's −100 kg category.

Athlete	Event	Round of 32	Round of 16	Quarterfinals	Semifinals	Repechage	Final / BM	
Athlete	Event	Opposition Result	Opposition Result	Opposition Result	Opposition Result	Opposition Result	Opposition Result	Rank
Oumar Koné	Men's −100 kg	Corrêa (BRA); L 0002–0102	Did not advance					

== Swimming ==
In total, two Malian athletes participated in the swimming events – Fatoumata Samassékou in the women's 50 m freestyle and Mamadou Soumare in the men's 100 m freestyle.

Men

Athlete	Event	Heat		Semifinal		Final	
Athlete	Event	Time	Rank	Time	Rank	Time	Rank
Mamadou Soumare	100 m freestyle	57.32	52	Did not advance			

Women

Athlete	Event	Heat		Semifinal		Final	
Athlete	Event	Time	Rank	Time	Rank	Time	Rank
Fatoumata Samassékou	50 m freestyle	31.88	61	Did not advance			

== Taekwondo ==
In total, one Malian athlete participated in the taekwondo events – Daba Modibo Keïta in the men's +80 kg category.

Athlete	Event	Round of 16	Quarterfinals	Semifinals	Repechage	Bronze Medal	Final	
Athlete	Event	Opposition Result	Opposition Result	Opposition Result	Opposition Result	Opposition Result	Opposition Result	Rank
Daba Modibo Keïta	Men's +80 kg	Irgashev (UZB); W 13–4	Coulombe-Fortier (CAN); W 11–6	Molfetta (ITA); L 4–6	Bye	Despaigne (CUB); L WO	Did not advance	5
