= Taekwondo at the 2004 Summer Olympics – Men's +80 kg =

Taekwondo competition

Men's +80 kg at the Games of the XXVIII Olympiad
- Venue: Faliro Coastal Zone Olympic Complex
- Date: 29 August
- Competitors: 16 from 16 nations

Medalists
1st place, gold medalist(s)		Moon Dae-Sung	South Korea
2nd place, silver medalist(s)		Alexandros Nikolaidis	Greece
3rd place, bronze medalist(s)		Pascal Gentil	France

The men's +80 kg competition in taekwondo at the 2004 Summer Olympics in Athens took place on August 29 at the Faliro Coastal Zone Olympic Complex.

South Korean taekwondo jin and 1999 world champion Moon Dae-sung unleashed a wicked roundhouse kick to knock out two-meter tall fighter and home favorite Alexandros Nikolaidis of Greece from the mat for an Olympic gold just a minute into the bout. Meanwhile, France's Pascal Gentil opened up a four-point gap over Jordan's Ibrahim Kamal, and defeated him 6–2 to repeat his bronze medal victory from Sydney four years earlier.

== Competition format ==
The main bracket consisted of a single elimination tournament, culminating in the gold medal match. The taekwondo fighters eliminated in earlier rounds by the two finalists of the main bracket advanced directly to the repechage tournament. These matches determined the bronze medal winner for the event.

== Schedule ==
All times are Greece Standard Time (UTC+2)

Date	Time	Round
Sunday, 29 August 2004	09:00; 12:00; 13:30; 15:30	Preliminary Round; Quarterfinals; Semifinals; Final

== Results ==
Legend

- PTG — Won by points gap
- KO — Won by knockout
- SUP — Won by superiority
- OT — Won on over time (Golden Point)
- WO — Walkover

=== Main bracket ===
Preliminary round
Ibrahim Kamal (JOR)	9
Zakaria Asidah (DEN)	6
Nguyen Van Hung (VIE)	8
Teemu Heino (FIN)	5
Abdelkader Zrouri (MAR)	8
Luis Noguera (VEN)	5
Alexandros Nikolaidis (GRE)	7
Julian Rojas (COL)	3
Tudor Sanon (HAI)	2
Kristopher Moitland (CRC)	3
Chika Chukwumerije (NGR)	0
Pascal Gentil (FRA)	2
Jon García (ESP)	13
Zoran Prerad (BIH)	2
Moon Dae-Sung (KOR)	7
Adilkhan Sagindykov (KAZ)	2

Second round
Ibrahim Kamal (JOR)	9
Nguyen Van Hung (VIE)	7
Abdelkader Zrouri (MAR)	2
Alexandros Nikolaidis (GRE)	5
Kristopher Moitland (CRC)	−1
Pascal Gentil (FRA)	4
Jon García (ESP)	2
Moon Dae-Sung (KOR)	6

Semifinals
Ibrahim Kamal (JOR)	3
Alexandros Nikolaidis (GRE)	6
Pascal Gentil (FRA)	3
Moon Dae-Sung (KOR)	5

Gold medal match
Alexandros Nikolaidis (GRE)	2:10-1
Moon Dae-Sung (KOR)	KO

=== Repechage ===
Quarterfinals
Jon García (ESP)	5
Adilkhan Sagindykov (KAZ)	5+
Abdelkader Zrouri (MAR)	6
Julian Rojas (COL)	2

Semifinals
Ibrahim Kamal (JOR)	2+
Adilkhan Sagindykov (KAZ)	2
Pascal Gentil (FRA)	3
Abdelkader Zrouri (MAR)	1

Bronze medal match
Ibrahim Kamal (JOR)	2
Pascal Gentil (FRA)	6
