= Mali at the 2008 Summer Olympics =

- IOC code: MLI
- NOC: Comité National Olympique et Sportif du Mali

in Beijing
- Competitors: 17 in 4 sports
- Flag bearer: Daba Modibo Keita
- Medals: Gold 0 Silver 0 Bronze 0 Total 0

Summer Olympics appearances (overview)
- 1964; 1968; 1972; 1976; 1980; 1984; 1988; 1992; 1996; 2000; 2004; 2008; 2012; 2016; 2020; 2024; 2028

Mali sent a delegation of 17 athletes in 4 sports to the 2008 Summer Olympics in Beijing, China. Most notable Malian participants are the 12 members of the Mali women's national basketball team winners of the FIBA Africa Championship for Women 2007 and Daba Modibo Keita, the 2007 World Taekwondo Champion. The remaining four athletes are Mohamed Coulibaly and Mariam Pauline Keita in Swimming and Ibrahima Maiga and Kadiatou Camara in Track and Field events.

== Athletics ==
Men

Athlete	Event	Heat		Semifinal		Final	
Athlete	Event	Result	Rank	Result	Rank	Result	Rank
Ibrahima Maiga	400 m hurdles	50.57	6	Did not advance			

Women

Athlete	Event	Heat		Semifinal		Final	
Athlete	Event	Result	Rank	Result	Rank	Result	Rank
Kadiatou Camara	200 m	23.06	2 Q	23.06	5	Did not advance	

Key

- Note–Ranks given for track events are within the athlete's heat only
- Q = Qualified for the next round
- q = Qualified for the next round as a fastest loser or, in field events, by position without achieving the qualifying target
- NR = National record
- N/A = Round not applicable for the event
- Bye = Athlete not required to compete in round

== Basketball ==
=== Women's tournament ===
The women's national team qualified by winning FIBA Africa Championship for Women 2007.

Roster

The following is the Mali roster in the women's basketball tournament of the 2008 Summer Olympics.

Mali women's national basketball team – 2008 Summer Olympics roster
Players
Coaches

Pos.	No.	Name	Age – Date of birth	Height	Club	Ctr.
G	4	Kadiatou Toure	25 – January 18, 1983	5 ft 9 in (1.75 m)	Djoliba AC	(Mali)
F	5	Nassira Traore	19 – October 28, 1988	6 ft 1 in (1.85 m)	Djoliba AC	(Mali)
G	6	Mariatou Diarra	22 – November 20, 1985	5 ft 10 in (1.78 m)	Dakar Université Club	(Senegal)
G	7	Fatoumata Bagayoko	20 – May 23, 1988	5 ft 10 in (1.78 m)	Djoliba AC	(Mali)
F	8	Diana Gandega	25 – June 2, 1983	5 ft 7 in (1.7 m)	Strasbourg IG	(France)
G/F	9	Hamchétou Maïga (C)	30 – April 25, 1978	6 ft 1 in (1.85 m)	Gambrinus SIKA Brno	(Czech Republic)
F	10	Kadiatou Kanoute	30 – June 11, 1978	5 ft 10 in (1.78 m)	Powerbasket Tigers Wels	(Austria)
F/C	11	Diéné Diawara	23 – January 29, 1985	6 ft 4 in (1.93 m)	Limoges ABC	(France)
F/C	12	Naîgnouma Coulibaly	19 – May 31, 1989	6 ft 4 in (1.93 m)	Basket Landes	(France)
C	13	Meiya Tirera	22 – April 15, 1986	5 ft 11 in (1.8 m)	Djoliba AC	(Mali)
C	14	Aminata Sininta	22 – December 23, 1985	6 ft 1 in (1.85 m)	Djoliba AC	(Mali)
C	15	Djenebou Sissoko	26 – June 27, 1982	6 ft 2 in (1.88 m)	Djoliba AC	(Mali)

Head coach

- (France) José Ruiz

Legend

- (C) Team captain
- Club – describes last
  club before the tournament
- Age – describes age
  on August 9, 2008

Group play

Pos	Team	Pld	W	L	PF	PA	PD	Pts	Qualification
1	United States	5	5	0	491	276	+215	10	Quarterfinals
2	China (H)	5	4	1	358	346	+12	9	Quarterfinals
3	Spain	5	3	2	357	324	+33	8	Quarterfinals
4	Czech Republic	5	2	3	346	356	−10	7	Quarterfinals
5	New Zealand	5	1	4	320	423	−103	6	
6	Mali	5	0	5	255	402	−147	5	

Source: FIBA archive
Rules for classification: 1) points; 2) head-to-head points; 3) head-to-head points difference; 4) head-to-head number of points scored.
(H) Hosts

9 August 2008
11:15

Report

Mali	72–76	New Zealand
Scoring by quarter: 18–18, 15–24, 21–18, 18–16
Pts: Maïga 18; Rebs: Coulibaly 12; Asts: Maïga 3		Pts: Marino 19; Rebs: Harmon 8 Asts: Marino 4

Wukesong Indoor Stadium, Beijing
Attendance: 11,083
Referees: Stephen Seibel (CAN)

11 August 2008
11:15

Report

Czech Republic	81–47	Mali
Scoring by quarter: 23–4, 15–18, 18–11, 25–14
Pts: Machová 14; Rebs: Kulichova, Vecerova 7 Asts: Mokrosova 3		Pts: Sissoko 24; Rebs: Sissoko 13; Asts: Bagayoko 3

Wukesong Indoor Stadium, Beijing
Attendance: 11,083
Referees: Scott Butler (AUS)

13 August 2008
22:15

Report

Mali	41–97	United States
Scoring by quarter: 12–24, 16–27, 5–25, 9–21
Pts: Sininta 13; Rebs: Sissoko 7 Asts: Bagayoko 3		Pts: Leslie 16; Rebs: Fowles 6 Asts: Lawson 7

Wukesong Indoor Stadium, Beijing
Attendance: 11,083
Referees: Maogong Yang (CHN)

15 August 2008
16:45

Report

China	69–48	Mali
Scoring by quarter: 17–7, 20–13, 15–15, 17–13
Pts: Miao 25; Rebs: Chen 9 Asts: Sui 5		Pts: Diawara, Sininta 11; Rebs: Sissoko 19; Asts: Diawara, Sininta 1

Wukesong Indoor Stadium, Beijing
Attendance: 11,083
Referees: Reynaldo Mercedes (DOM)

17 August 2008
09:00

Report

Mali	47–79	Spain
Scoring by quarter: 5–19, 16–17, 12–22, 13–21
Pts: Sissoko 17; Rebs: Diawara 15; Asts: Diawara, Kanouté 2		Pts: Valdemoro 21; Rebs: Montañana 9 Asts: Montañana, Aguilar, Lima, Martínez 4

Wukesong Indoor Stadium, Beijing
Attendance: 11,083
Referees: Elena Chernova (RUS)

== Swimming ==
Men

Athlete	Event	Heat		Semifinal		Final	
Athlete	Event	Time	Rank	Time	Rank	Time	Rank
Mohamed Coulibaly	50 m freestyle	29.09	86	Did not advance			

Women

Athlete	Event	Heat		Semifinal		Final	
Athlete	Event	Time	Rank	Time	Rank	Time	Rank
Mariam Pauline Keita	100 m breaststroke	1:24.26	49	Did not advance			

== Taekwondo ==
Athlete	Event	Round of 16	Quarterfinals	Semifinals	Repechage	Bronze Medal	Final	
Athlete	Event	Opposition Result	Opposition Result	Opposition Result	Opposition Result	Opposition Result	Opposition Result	Rank
Daba Modibo Keita	Men's +80 kg	Borot (FRA); W 6–5	Chukwumerije (NGR); L 0–1	Did not advance				
