= Taekwondo at the 2011 Pan American Games – Men's +80 kg =

Taekwondo – Men's +80 kg at the 2011 Pan American Games
- Venue: CODE II Gymnasium
- Dates: October 17
- Competitors: 15 from 15 nations

Medalists
Gold medal	Robelis Despaigne	Cuba
Silver medal	Juan Díaz	Venezuela
Bronze medal	Francois Coulombe-Fortier	Canada
Bronze medal	Stephen Lambdin	United States

The men's +80 kg competition of the taekwondo events at the 2011 Pan American Games took place on the 18 of October at the CODE II Gymnasium. The defending Pan American Games champion is Gerardo Ortiz of Cuba, while the defending Pan American Championship, champion is Christopher Moitland of Costa Rica.

== Schedule ==
All times are Central Standard Time (UTC-6).

Date	Time	Round
October 18, 2011	11:00	Preliminaries
October 18, 2011	12:30	Quarterfinals
October 18, 2011	17:00	Semifinals
October 18, 2011	18:00	Final

== Results ==
Legend

- KO — Knockout
- PTG — Won by Points Gap
- SUP — Won by Superiority
- OT — Won on over time (Golden Point)

=== Main bracket ===
Preliminary round
Kenneth Edwards (JAM)	12
David Rajjab (GUY)	6
Sanon Tudor (HAI)	4
Miguel Ferrera (HON)	12
Adrian Sagastume (GUA)	1
Robelis Despaigne (CUB)	7
Salvador Perez (MEX)	7
Martin Sio (ARG)	6
Stephen Lambdin (USA)	4
Carlos Cayas (COL)	0
Marvin Sellas (PUR)
Juan Díaz (VEN)	KO
Jurmen Amiena (SUR)	5
Kristopher Moitland (CRC)	8

Quarterfinals
Francois Coulombe-Fortier (CAN)	15 (SUP)
Kenneth Edwards (JAM)	3
Miguel Ferrera (HON)	0
Robelis Despaigne (CUB)	8
Salvador Perez (MEX)	3
Stephen Lambdin (USA)	4
Juan Díaz (VEN)	7
Kristopher Moitland (CRC)	6

Semifinals
Francois Coulombe-Fortier (CAN)	3
Robelis Despaigne (CUB)	5
Stephen Lambdin (USA)	3
Juan Díaz (VEN)	7

Gold medal match
Robelis Despaigne (CUB)	15
Juan Díaz (VEN)	5
