= Mali at the 2000 Summer Olympics =

- IOC code: MLI
- NOC: Comité National Olympique et Sportif du Mali

in Sydney
- Competitors: 5 in 3 sports
- Flag bearer: Brahima Guindo
- Medals: Gold 0 Silver 0 Bronze 0 Total 0

Summer Olympics appearances (overview)
- 1964; 1968; 1972; 1976; 1980; 1984; 1988; 1992; 1996; 2000; 2004; 2008; 2012; 2016; 2020; 2024

Mali competed at the 2000 Summer Olympics in Sydney, Australia.

== Competitors ==
The following is the list of number of competitors in the Games.

Sport	Men	Women	Total
Athletics	1	1	2
Judo	1	0	1
Swimming	1	1	2
Total	3	2	5

== Athletics ==
Key

- Note–Ranks given for track events are within the athlete's heat only
- Q = Qualified for the next round
- q = Qualified for the next round as a fastest loser or, in field events, by position without achieving the qualifying target
- NR = National record
- N/A = Round not applicable for the event
- Bye = Athlete not required to compete in round

Men
Track and road events

Athletes	Events	Heat Round 1		Heat Round 2		Semifinal		Final	
Athletes	Events	Time	Rank	Time	Rank	Time	Rank	Time	Rank
Youssouf Simpara	100 metres	10.82	76	did not advance					

Women
Track and road events

Athletes	Events	Heat Round 1		Heat Round 2		Semifinal		Final	
Athletes	Events	Time	Rank	Time	Rank	Time	Rank	Time	Rank
Kadiatou Camara	100 metres	11.65	47	did not advance					

== Judo ==
Men

Athlete	Event	Round of 32	Round of 16	Quarterfinals	Semifinals	Repechage 1	Repechage 2	Repechage 3	Final / BM	
Athlete	Event	Opposition Result	Opposition Result	Opposition Result	Opposition Result	Opposition Result	Opposition Result	Opposition Result	Opposition Result	Rank
Brahima Guindo	−81 kg	Sarikhani (IRI); L	did not advance							

== Swimming ==
Men

Athlete	Event	Heat		Semifinal		Final	
Athlete	Event	Time	Rank	Time	Rank	Time	Rank
Bakary Sereme	50 m freestyle	29.69	74	did not advance			

Women

Athlete	Event	Heat		Semifinal		Final	
Athlete	Event	Time	Rank	Time	Rank	Time	Rank
Mariam Keita	Women's 50 m breaststroke	1:37.80	40	did not advance			
