= Athletics at the 1964 Summer Olympics – Men's decathlon =

Decathlon at the Games of the XVIII Olympiad
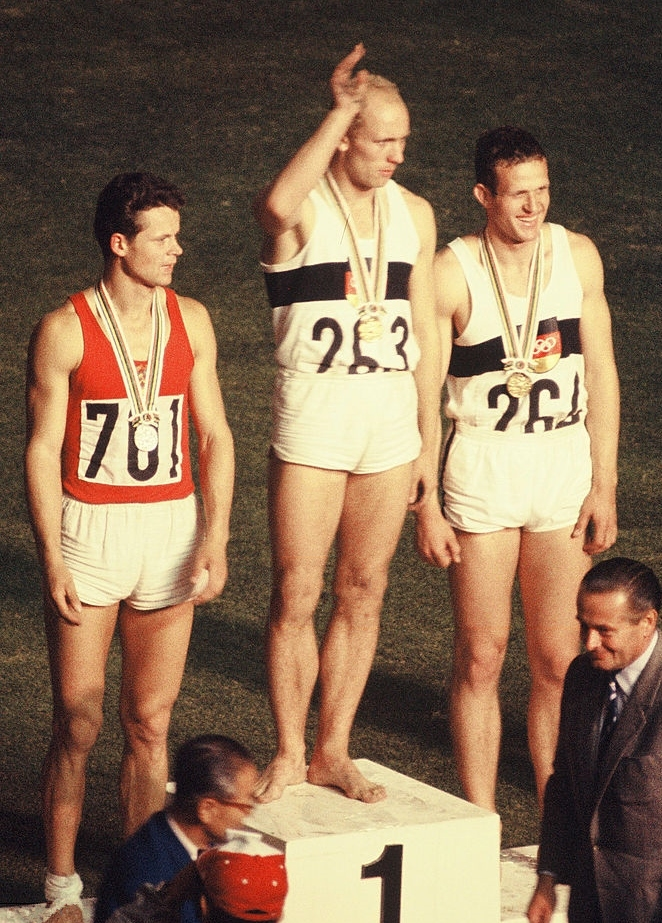
- Venue: Olympic Stadium
- Dates: 19–20 October 1964
- Competitors: 23 from 15 nations

Medalists
1st place, gold medalist(s)		Willi Holdorf	United Team of Germany
2nd place, silver medalist(s)		Rein Aun	Soviet Union
3rd place, bronze medalist(s)		Hans-Joachim Walde	United Team of Germany

The decathlon was a men's event and part of the Athletics at the 1964 Summer Olympics program in Tokyo. It was held on 19 October and 20 October 1964. 23 athletes from 15 nations entered and 22 started the first event.

== Results ==
=== First day ===
==== 100 metres ====
Place	Athlete	Nation	Time	Points		
Place	Athlete	Nation	Time	Event	Total	Rank
1	Willi Holdorf	United Team of Germany	10.7 seconds	879	879	1
1	Hector Thomas	Venezuela	10.7 seconds	879	879	1
3	Rein Aun	Soviet Union	10.9 seconds	828	828	3
3	Vasili Kuznetsov	Soviet Union	10.9 seconds	828	828	3
5	Russ Hodge	United States	11.0 seconds	804	804	5
5	Mykhaylo Storozhenko	Soviet Union	11.0 seconds	804	804	5
5	Hans-Joachim Walde	United Team of Germany	11.0 seconds	804	804	5
5	Yang Chuan-kwang	Taiwan	11.0 seconds	804	804	5
9	Dramane Sereme	Mali	11.1 seconds	780	780	9
9	Shosuke Suzuki	Japan	11.1 seconds	780	780	9
9	Valbjørn Thorlaksson	Iceland	11.1 seconds	780	780	9
12	Horst Beyer	United Team of Germany	11.2 seconds	756	756	12
12	Richard John Emberger	United States	11.2 seconds	756	756	12
12	Bill Gairdner	Canada	11.2 seconds	756	756	12
12	Paul Irvin Herman	United States	11.2 seconds	756	756	12
16	Alois Buchel	Liechtenstein	11.3 seconds	733	733	16
16	Werner Duttweiler	Switzerland	11.3 seconds	733	733	16
16	Eef Kamerbeek	Netherlands	11.3 seconds	733	733	16
16	Franco Sar	Italy	11.3 seconds	733	733	16
20	Gerry Moro	Canada	11.6 seconds	665	665	20
21	Koech Kiprop	Kenya	11.7 seconds	643	643	21
21	Wu Ar Min	Taiwan	11.7 seconds	643	643	21
—	Samir Ambrose Vincent	Iraq	Did not start	Did not start		—

==== Long jump ====
Place	Athlete	Nation	Distance	Points		
Place	Athlete	Nation	Distance	Event	Total	Rank
1	Rein Aun	Soviet Union	7.22 metres	865	1693	3
1	Mykhaylo Storozhenko	Soviet Union	7.22 metres	865	1669	4
3	Hans-Joachim Walde	United Team of Germany	7.21 metres	863	1667	5
4	Horst Beyer	United Team of Germany	7.02 metres	824	1580	8
5	Willi Holdorf	United Team of Germany	7.00 metres	820	1699	1
5	Hector Thomas	Venezuela	7.00 metres	820	1699	1
7	Vasili Kuznetsov	Soviet Union	6.98 metres	816	1644	6
8	Paul Irvin Herman	United States	6.97 metres	814	1570	10
9	Werner Duttweiler	Switzerland	6.94 metres	808	1541	11
10	Alois Buchel	Liechtenstein	6.81 metres	780	1513	13
11	Yang Chuan-kwang	Taiwan	6.80 metres	778	1582	7
12	Russ Hodge	United States	6.75 metres	767	1571	9
13	Richard John Emberger	United States	6.72 metres	761	1517	12
14	Eef Kamerbeek	Netherlands	6.56 metres	728	1461	17
15	Suzuki Shosuke	Japan	6.53 metres	721	1501	14
16	Dramane Sereme	Mali	6.51 metres	717	1497	15
17	Koech Kiprop	Kenya	6.50 metres	715	1358	20
18	Valbjoern Thorlaksson	Iceland	6.43 metres	699	1479	16
19	Bill Gairdner	Canada	6.40 metres	693	1449	18
20	Franco Sar	Italy	6.31 metres	673	1406	19
21	Gerry Moro	Canada	6.20 metres	648	1313	21
22	Wu Ar Min	Taiwan	5.90 metres	582	1225	22
—	Samir Ambrose Vincent	Iraq	—	Did not start		—

==== Shot put ====
Storozhenko moved from fourth place to first with his performance in the shot put, as Thomas dropped from the lead to eighth.

Place	Athlete	Nation	Distance	Points		
Place	Athlete	Nation	Distance	Event	Total	Rank
1	Mykhaylo Storozhenko	Soviet Union	16.37 metres	868	2537	1
2	Willi Holdorf	United Team of Germany	14.95 metres	786	2485	2
3	Russ Hodge	United States	14.93 metres	784	2355	6
4	Hans-Joachim Walde	United Team of Germany	14.45 metres	756	2423	3
5	Eef Kamerbeek	Netherlands	14.40 metres	753	2214	12
6	Horst Beyer	United Team of Germany	14.32 metres	747	2327	7
7	Vasili Kuznetsov	Soviet Union	14.06 metres	732	2376	5
8	Paul Irvin Herman	United States	13.89 metres	721	2291	9
9	Rein Aun	Soviet Union	13.82 metres	717	2410	4
10	Werner Duttweiler	Switzerland	13.80 metres	716	2257	11
11	Franco Sar	Italy	13.60 metres	702	2108	16
12	Bill Gairdner	Canada	13.38 metres	689	2138	14
13	Yang Chuan-kwang	Taiwan	13.23 metres	680	2262	10
14	Valbjoern Thorlaksson	Iceland	13.10 metres	671	2150	13
15	Gerry Moro	Canada	12.62 metres	640	1953	20
16	Hector Thomas	Venezuela	12.42 metres	627	2326	8
17	Alois Buchel	Liechtenstein	12.16 metres	610	2123	15
18	Richard John Emberger	United States	11.80 metres	586	2103	17
19	Suzuki Shosuke	Japan	11.35 metres	556	2057	18
20	Dramane Sereme	Mali	11.03 metres	504	2031	19
21	Wu Ar Min	Taiwan	10.67 metres	509	1734	22
22	Koech Kiprop	Kenya	10.55 metres	500	1758	21
—	Samir Ambrose Vincent	Iraq	—	Did not start		—

==== High jump ====
Wu dropped out of contention after three events, not competing in the high jump.

Place	Athlete	Nation	Height	Points		
Place	Athlete	Nation	Height	Event	Total	Rank
1	Hans-Joachim Walde	United Team of Germany	1.96 metres	822	3245	2
2	Rein Aun	Soviet Union	1.93 metres	796	3206	3
2	Werner Duttweiler	Switzerland	1.93 metres	796	3053	6
4	Horst Beyer	United Team of Germany	1.90 metres	769	3096	5
4	Richard John Emberger	United States	1.90 metres	769	2872	12
6	Paul Irvin Herman	United States	1.87 metres	743	3034	7
6	Koech Kiprop	Kenya	1.87 metres	743	2601	19
8	Mykhaylo Storozhenko	Soviet Union	1.84 metres	716	3253	1
8	Willi Holdorf	United Team of Germany	1.84 metres	716	3201	4
10	Yang Chuan-kwang	Taiwan	1.81 metres	689	2951	11
10	Valbjoern Thorlaksson	Iceland	1.81 metres	689	2839	13
10	Alois Buchel	Liechtenstein	1.81 metres	689	2812	14
13	Russ Hodge	United States	1.75 metres	634	2989	8
13	Hector Thomas	Venezuela	1.75 metres	634	2960	10
13	Franco Sar	Italy	1.75 metres	634	2742	16
16	Vasili Kuznetsov	Soviet Union	1.70 metres	588	2964	9
16	Eef Kamerbeek	Netherlands	1.70 metres	588	2802	15
16	Bill Gairdner	Canada	1.70 metres	588	2726	17
16	Suzuki Shosuke	Japan	1.70 metres	588	2645	18
16	Gerry Moro	Canada	1.70 metres	588	2541	20
21	Dramane Sereme	Mali	1.60 metres	493	2524	21
—	Wu Ar Min	Taiwan	Withdrew	—	1734	—
—	Samir Ambrose Vincent	Iraq	—	Did not start		—

==== 400 metres ====
Storozhenko, leading after four, finished last in the 400 metres, falling to fifth place.

Place	Athlete	Nation	Time	Points		
Place	Athlete	Nation	Time	Event	Total	Rank
1	Willi Holdorf	United Team of Germany	48.2 seconds	889	4090	1
2	Rein Aun	Soviet Union	48.8 seconds	861	4067	3
3	Yang Chuan-kwang	Taiwan	49.0 seconds	852	3803	9
4	Richard John Emberger	United States	49.1 seconds	847	3719	11
5	Paul Irvin Herman	United States	49.2 seconds	842	3876	6
5	Bill Gairdner	Canada	49.2 seconds	842	3568	15
7	Hans-Joachim Walde	United Team of Germany	49.5 seconds	829	4074	2
7	Vasili Kuznetsov	Soviet Union	49.2 seconds	842	3793	10
9	Russ Hodge	United States	49.6 seconds	824	3813	8
10	Alois Buchel	Liechtenstein	49.7 seconds	819	3631	14
11	Horst Beyer	United Team of Germany	49.8 seconds	814	3910	4
12	Valbjoern Thorlaksson	Iceland	50.1 seconds	801	3640	13
13	Werner Duttweiler	Switzerland	50.5 seconds	784	3837	7
14	Suzuki Shosuke	Japan	50.8 seconds	770	3415	18
15	Dramane Sereme	Mali	51.2 seconds	753	3277	20
16	Hector Thomas	Venezuela	51.4 seconds	744	3704	12
17	Eef Kamerbeek	Netherlands	52.0 seconds	720	3522	16
17	Gerry Moro	Canada	52.0 seconds	720	3261	21
19	Franco Sar	Italy	52.2 seconds	712	3454	17
20	Koech Kiprop	Kenya	52.8 seconds	687	3288	19
21	Mykhaylo Storozhenko	Soviet Union	53.6 seconds	655	3908	5
—	Wu Ar Min	Taiwan	Withdrew	—	1734	—
—	Samir Ambrose Vincent	Iraq	—	Did not start		—

==== First day rankings ====
1. Willi Holdorf, 4090 points
2. Hans-Joachim Walde, 4074 points
3. Rein Aun, 4067 points
4. Horst Beyer, 3910 points
5. Mykhaylo Storozhenko, 3908 points
6. Paul Irvin Herman, 3876 points
7. Werner Duttweiler, 3837 points
8. Russ Hodge, 3813 points
9. Yang Chuan Kwang, 3803 points
10. Vasili Kuznetsov, 3793 points
11. Richard John Emberger, 3719 points
12. Hector Thomas, 3704 points
13. Valbjoern Thorlaksson, 3640 points
14. Alois Buchel, 3631 points
15. Bill Gairdner, 3568 points
16. Eef Kamerbeek, 3522 points
17. Franco Sar, 3454 points
18. Suzuki Shosuke, 3415 points
19. Koech Kiprop, 3288 points
20. Dramane Sereme, 3277 points
21. Gerry Moro, 3261 points
22. Wu Ar Min, 1734 points (withdrew)
23. Samir Ambrose Vincent, 0 points (withdrew)

=== Second day ===
==== 110 metre hurdles ====
Kamerbeek became the second decathlete to drop out.

Place	Athlete	Nation	Time	Points		
Place	Athlete	Nation	Time	Event	Total	Rank
1	Yang Chuan-kwang	Taiwan	14.7 seconds	881	4684	7
2	Franco Sar	Italy	14.8 seconds	870	4324	15
3	Vasili Kuznetsov	Soviet Union	14.9 seconds	859	4652	8
3	Richard John Emberger	United States	14.9 seconds	859	4578	10
5	Willi Holdorf	United Team of Germany	15.0 seconds	848	4938	1
5	Mykhaylo Storozhenko	Soviet Union	15.0 seconds	848	4756	4
7	Koech Kiprop	Kenya	15.1 seconds	837	4125	17
8	Horst Beyer	United Team of Germany	15.2 seconds	827	4737	5
8	Paul Irvin Herman	United States	15.2 seconds	827	4703	6
10	Hans-Joachim Walde	United Team of Germany	15.3 seconds	817	4891	2
11	Bill Gairdner	Canada	15.4 seconds	807	4375	14
12	Valbjoern Thorlaksson	Iceland	15.6 seconds	787	4427	12
13	Rein Aun	Soviet Union	15.9 seconds	757	4824	3
13	Werner Duttweiler	Switzerland	15.9 seconds	757	4594	9
15	Russ Hodge	United States	16.0 seconds	748	4561	11
16	Dramane Sereme	Mali	16.4 seconds	712	3989	19
17	Suzuki Shosuke	Japan	16.5 seconds	703	4118	18
18	Hector Thomas	Venezuela	16.7 seconds	685	4389	13
19	Gerry Moro	Canada	16.8 seconds	676	3937	20
20	Alois Buchel	Liechtenstein	17.5 seconds	621	4252	16
—	Eef Kamerbeek	Netherlands	Withdrew	—	3522	—
—	Wu Ar Min	Taiwan	Withdrew	—	1734	—
—	Samir Ambrose Vincent	Iraq	—	Did not start		—

==== Discus throw ====
Place	Athlete	Nation	Distance	Points		
Place	Athlete	Nation	Distance	Event	Total	Rank
1	Franco Sar	Italy	47.46 metres	827	5151	11
2	Willi Holdorf	United Team of Germany	46.05 metres	801	5739	1
3	Horst Beyer	United Team of Germany	45.17 metres	784	5521	4
4	Russ Hodge	United States	44.64 metres	775	5336	9
5	Rein Aun	Soviet Union	44.19 metres	766	5590	3
6	Paul Irvin Herman	United States	44.15 metres	765	5468	6
7	Vasili Kuznetsov	Soviet Union	43.81 metres	759	5411	7
8	Hans-Joachim Walde	United Team of Germany	43.15 metres	747	5638	2
8	Mykhaylo Storozhenko	Soviet Union	43.15 metres	747	5503	5
10	Bill Gairdner	Canada	42.91 metres	742	5117	13
11	Gerry Moro	Canada	40.90 metres	703	4640	19
12	Valbjoern Thorlaksson	Iceland	39.70 metres	680	5107	14
13	Yang Chuan-kwang	Taiwan	39.59 metres	677	5361	8
14	Hector Thomas	Venezuela	38.43 metres	654	5043	15
15	Alois Buchel	Liechtenstein	37.19 metres	629	4881	16
16	Richard John Emberger	United States	35.32 metres	590	5168	10
17	Suzuki Shosuke	Japan	35.24 metres	589	4707	17
18	Koech Kiprop	Kenya	33.07 metres	542	4667	18
19	Werner Duttweiler	Switzerland	32.66 metres	533	5127	12
20	Dramane Sereme	Mali	29.24 metres	457	4446	20
—	Eef Kamerbeek	Netherlands	Withdrew	—	3522	—
—	Wu Ar Min	Taiwan	Withdrew	—	1734	—
—	Samir Ambrose Vincent	Iraq	—	Did not start		—

==== Pole vault ====
Duttweiler and Thomas both dropped out before the pole vault. Yang continued to advance, and Herman and Kuznetsov also moved into position to challenge for medals, while Beyer dropped out of contention into 8th place. Holdorf's lead grew to almost 130 points, almost unassailable, and nearly as many as the 150 that separated 2nd from 5th places.

Place	Athlete	Nation	Height	Points		
Place	Athlete	Nation	Height	Event	Total	Rank
1	Yang Chuan-kwang	Taiwan	4.60 metres	957	6318	6
1	Gerry Moro	Canada	4.60 metres	957	5597	15
3	Vasili Kuznetsov	Soviet Union	4.40 metres	909	6320	5
3	Valbjoern Thorlaksson	Iceland	4.40 metres	909	6016	10
5	Paul Irvin Herman	United States	4.35 metres	896	6364	4
6	Suzuki Shosuke	Japan	4.25 metres	871	5578	16
7	Willi Holdorf	United Team of Germany	4.20 metres	859	6598	1
7	Rein Aun	Soviet Union	4.20 metres	859	6449	3
7	Franco Sar	Italy	4.20 metres	859	6010	11
10	Hans-Joachim Walde	United Team of Germany	4.10 metres	832	6470	2
11	Koech Kiprop	Kenya	4.05 metres	820	5487	17
12	Mykhaylo Storozhenko	Soviet Union	4.00 metres	807	6310	7
12	Alois Buchel	Liechtenstein	4.00 metres	807	5688	14
14	Horst Beyer	United Team of Germany	3.80 metres	754	6275	8
15	Russ Hodge	United States	3.70 metres	728	6064	9
15	Richard John Emberger	United States	3.70 metres	728	5896	12
17	Bill Gairdner	Canada	3.40 metres	644	5761	13
18	Dramane Sereme	Mali	2.60 metres	403	4849	18
—	Werner Duttweiler	Switzerland	Withdrew	—	5127	—
—	Hector Thomas	Venezuela	Withdrew	—	5043	—
—	Eef Kamerbeek	Netherlands	Withdrew	—	3522	—
—	Wu Ar Min	Taiwan	Withdrew	—	1734	—
—	Samir Ambrose Vincent	Iraq	—	Did not start		—

==== Javelin throw ====
In the javelin throw, Yang won another event, moving up to fourth place. Holdorf fared poorly, his lead shrinking to 60 points, but with Walde increasing to 67 points ahead of Aun in third place, a German gold medal was nearly assured and the top pair was looking quite likely. In contrast, Yang was only 23 points behind Aun in an effort to knock the Soviet off the medal platform. Kuznetsov was still only a point behind Yang and Herman was not far from them either.

Place	Athlete	Nation	Height	Points		
Place	Athlete	Nation	Height	Event	Total	Rank
1	Yang Chuan-kwang	Taiwan	68.15 metres	858	7176	4
2	Vasili Kuznetsov	Soviet Union	67.87 metres	855	7175	5
3	Paul Irvin Herman	United States	63.35 metres	802	7166	6
4	Hans-Joachim Walde	United Team of Germany	62.90 metres	796	7266	2
5	Bill Gairdner	Canada	59.72 metres	758	6519	13
6	Rein Aun	Soviet Union	59.06 metres	750	7199	3
6	Mykhaylo Storozhenko	Soviet Union	59.06 metres	750	7060	7
8	Horst Beyer	United Team of Germany	58.17 metres	738	7013	8
9	Richard John Emberger	United States	57.54 metres	731	6627	12
10	Willi Holdorf	United Team of Germany	57.37 metres	728	7326	1
11	Valbjoern Thorlaksson	Iceland	56.19 metres	714	6730	9
12	Koech Kiprop	Kenya	55.54 metres	705	6192	16
13	Franco Sar	Italy	53.59 metres	680	6690	11
14	Suzuki Shosuke	Japan	51.88 metres	658	6236	15
15	Russ Hodge	United States	50.21 metres	636	6700	10
16	Dramane Sereme	Mali	48.46 metres	612	5461	18
17	Gerry Moro	Canada	46.63 metres	587	6184	17
18	Alois Buchel	Liechtenstein	44.90 metres	562	6250	14
—	Werner Duttweiler	Switzerland	Withdrew	—	5127	—
—	Hector Thomas	Venezuela	Withdrew	—	5043	—
—	Eef Kamerbeek	Netherlands	Withdrew	—	3522	—
—	Wu Ar Min	Taiwan	Withdrew	—	1734	—
—	Samir Ambrose Vincent	Iraq	—	Did not start		—

==== 1500 metres ====
The final event was the 1500 metres. Emberger was the fastest in the event, but still finished in 10th place overall. Aun, with a 67-point deficit to catch Walde for the silver medal, needed to run approximately 10 seconds faster than the German. His 4:22.3 was more than enough to beat Walde's 4:37.5, giving Aun 100 more points than Walde and the silver medal. Yang and Kuznetsov, who had been threatening to join the medalists, each dropped in the rankings after the 1500.

Place	Athlete	Nation	Time	Points		
Place	Athlete	Nation	Time	Event	Total	Rank
1	Richard John Emberger	United States	4:19.3	665	7292	10
2	Rein Aun	Soviet Union	4:22.3	643	7842	2
3	Horst Beyer	United Team of Germany	4:23.6	634	7647	6
4	Bill Gairdner	Canada	4:24.5	628	7147	11
5	Russ Hodge	United States	4:24.9	629	7325	9
6	Paul Irvin Herman	United States	4:25.4	621	7787	4
7	Suzuki Shosuke	Japan	4:28.1	602	6838	15
8	Alois Buchel	Liechtenstein	4:28.6	599	6849	14
9	Willi Holdorf	United Team of Germany	4:34.3	561	7887	1
10	Hans-Joachim Walde	United Team of Germany	4:37.5	543	7809	3
11	Gerry Moro	Canada	4:38.8	532	6716	16
12	Koech Kiprop	Kenya	4:41.6	515	6707	17
13	Yang Chuan-kwang	Taiwan	4:48.4	474	7650	5
14	Dramane Sereme	Mali	4:51.5	456	5917	18
15	Valbjoern Thorlaksson	Iceland	5:00.6	405	7135	12
16	Mykhaylo Storozhenko	Soviet Union	5:00.7	404	7464	8
17	Vasili Kuznetsov	Soviet Union	5:02.5	394	7569	7
18	Franco Sar	Italy	5:08.4	364	7054	13
—	Werner Duttweiler	Switzerland	Withdrew	—	5127	—
—	Hector Thomas	Venezuela	Withdrew	—	5043	—
—	Eef Kamerbeek	Netherlands	Withdrew	—	3522	—
—	Wu Ar Min	Taiwan	Withdrew	—	1734	—
—	Samir Ambrose Vincent	Iraq	—	Did not start		—

==== Final standings ====
Place	Athlete	Nation	Points
1st place, gold medalist(s)	Willi Holdorf	United Team of Germany	7887
2nd place, silver medalist(s)	Rein Aun	Soviet Union	7842
3rd place, bronze medalist(s)	Hans-Joachim Walde	United Team of Germany	7809
4	Paul Irvin Herman	United States	7787
5	Yang Chuan-kwang	Taiwan	7650
6	Horst Beyer	United Team of Germany	7647
7	Vasili Kuznetsov	Soviet Union	7569
8	Mykhaylo Storozhenko	Soviet Union	7464
9	Russ Hodge	United States	7325
10	Richard John Emberger	United States	7292
11	Bill Gairdner	Canada	7147
12	Valbjoern Thorlaksson	Iceland	7135
13	Franco Sar	Italy	7054
14	Alois Buchel	Liechtenstein	6849
15	Suzuki Shosuke	Japan	6838
16	Gerry Moro	Canada	6716
17	Koech Kiprop	Kenya	6707
18	Dramane Sereme	Mali	5917
—	Werner Duttweiler	Switzerland	Did not finish 5127 after 7 events
—	Hector Thomas	Venezuela	Did not finish 5043 after 7 events
—	Eef Kamerbeek	Netherlands	Did not finish 3522 after 5 events
—	Wu Ar Min	Taiwan	Did not finish 1734 after 3 events
—	Samir Ambrose Vincent	Iraq	Did not start
