= Ibrahim Kamal =

Jordanian taekwondo practitioner

Ibrahim Aqil
Personal information
- Full name: Ibrahim Aqil Kamal
- Nationality: Jordan
- Born: 14 April 1979 (age 47) Amman, Jordan
- Height: 1.89 m (6 ft 2 1/2 in)
- Weight: 95 kg (209 lb)

Sport
- Sport: Taekwondo
- Event: +80 kg
Medal record
Men's taekwondo
Representing Jordan
Asian Games
Silver medal – second place	1998 Bangkok	+83 kg
Asian Championships
Bronze medal – third place	1998 Ho Chi Minh	+83 kg
Bronze medal – third place	2004 Seongnam	+84 kg

Ibrahim Aqil Kamal (Arabic: ابراهيم عقيل كمال; born April 14, 1979, in Amman) is a Jordanian taekwondo practitioner, who competed in the men's heavyweight category. He captured two bronze medals in the over-84 kg division at the Asian Taekwondo Championships (1998 and 2004), and represented his nation Jordan at the 2004 Summer Olympics.

Ibrahim qualified for the Jordanian squad in the men's heavyweight class (80 kg) at the 2004 Summer Olympics in Athens, by placing third and granting a berth from the Asian Olympic Qualifying Tournament in Bangkok, Thailand. He defeated Denmark's Zakaria Asidah and Vietnam's Nguyen Van Hung in the prelims, before falling behind two-meter-tall local favorite Alexandros Nikolaidis of Greece in the semifinal match with a score of 3–6. As his formidable Greek opponent moved forward into the final, Ibrahim offered a chance for Jordan's first Olympic medal with a more satisfying victory over Kazakhstan's Adilkhan Sagindykov by a marginal judging decision in the repechage rounds, but slipped his chance in a 2–6 defeat to French fighter Pascal Gentil for the bronze, relegating Ibrahim to fourth place.
