= Adilkhan Sagindykov =

Kazakhstani taekwondo practitioner

Personal information
- Full name: Adilkhan Syrlybayevich; Sagindykov
- Nationality: Kazakhstan
- Born: 26 June 1979 (age 47) Ongutsik Qazaqstan, Kazakh SSR, Soviet Union
- Height: 1.87 m (6 ft 2 in)
- Weight: 85 kg (187 lb)

Sport
- Sport: Taekwondo
- Event: +80 kg
Medal record
Men's taekwondo
Representing Kazakhstan
World Championships
Bronze medal – third place	1999 Edmonton	+84 kg

Adilkhan Syrlybayevich Sagindykov (Kazakh: Әділхан Сырлыбаевич Сағындықов; born 26 June 1979) is a Kazakh taekwondo practitioner, who competed in the men's heavyweight category. He picked up a bronze medal in the over-84 kg category at the 1999 World Taekwondo Championships in Edmonton, Alberta, Canada, and attained a fifth-place finish at the 2004 Summer Olympics, representing his nation Kazakhstan.

Sagindykov qualified as a lone taekwondo fighter for the Kazakh squad in the men's heavyweight class (+80 kg) at the 2004 Summer Olympics in Athens, by granting a berth and placing fifth from the Asian Olympic Qualifying Tournament in Bangkok, Thailand. He lost his opening match 2–7 to South Korean taekwondo jin and eventual Olympic champion Moon Dae-sung, but spared elimination by moving abruptly into the repechage bracket for his chance of an Olympic bronze medal. In the repechage, Sagindykov edged out Spain's Jon García in his first playoff before ending his Olympic debut with a fifth-place finish in favor of the referee's decision, following a 2–2 tie with Jordan's Ibrahim Kamal.
