= Zoran Prerad =

Bosnian Serb taekwondo practitioner

Personal information
- Full name: Zoran Prerad
- Nationality: Bosnia and Herzegovina
- Born: 15 August 1971 (age 55) Banja Luka, SR Bosnia, SFR Yugoslavia
- Height: 1.85 m (6 ft 1 in)
- Weight: 94 kg (207 lb)

Sport
- Sport: Taekwondo
- Event: +80 kg
Medal record
Men's taekwondo
Representing FR Yugoslavia
World Championships
Bronze medal – third place	1995 Manila	83 kg
European Championships
Gold medal – first place	1998 Eindhoven	84 kg

Zoran Prerad (Serbian Cyrillic: Зоран Прерад; born August 15, 1971, in Banja Luka) is a Bosnian Serb taekwondo practitioner, who competed in the men's heavyweight category. He claimed a bronze medal in the 83-kg division at the 1995 World Taekwondo Championships in Manila, Philippines, retrieved the men's heavyweight title at the 1998 European Championships in Eindhoven, Netherlands, and became the first and only Bosnian taekwondo jin to mark his 2004 Olympic debut in Athens.

Prerad qualified as a lone 31-year-old taekwondo fighter for the Bosnian squad in the men's heavyweight class (+80 kg) at the 2004 Summer Olympics in Athens, by receiving a tripartite invitation from the International Taekwondo Federation. Having a lack of international experience to the sport, Prerad fell short on a clear 13–2 gap to Spanish practitioner Jon García in his opening match. With Garcia losing the quarterfinals to South Korea's Moon Dae-sung, Prerad denied his chance to compete for Bosnia and Herzegovina's possible Olympic medal in the repechage.
