= Jason Neville =

Jason Neville may refer to:

- Jason Neville (taekwondo) in 2009 World Taekwondo Championships – Men's heavyweight
- Jason Neville, character in Revolution (TV series)
