= Mali at the 2016 Summer Olympics =

- IOC code: MLI
- NOC: Comité National Olympique et Sportif du Mali

in Rio de Janeiro
- Competitors: 6 in 4 sports
- Flag bearer (opening): Djénébou Danté
- Flag bearer (closing): Ismaël Coulibaly
- Medals: Gold 0 Silver 0 Bronze 0 Total 0

Summer Olympics appearances (overview)
- 1964; 1968; 1972; 1976; 1980; 1984; 1988; 1992; 1996; 2000; 2004; 2008; 2012; 2016; 2020; 2024

Mali competed at the 2016 Summer Olympics in Rio de Janeiro, Brazil, from 5 to 21 August 2016. Since the nation made its debut in 1964, Malian athletes had appeared in every edition of the Summer Olympic Games, with the exception of the 1976 Summer Olympics in Montreal because of the African boycott.

Mali National Olympic and Sports Committee (French: Comité National Olympique et Sportif du Mali) selected a team of six athletes, four men and two women, to compete only in athletics, judo, swimming, and taekwondo at the Games, matching the nation's roster size with London 2012. Among the Malian athletes were freestyle swimmer Fatoumata Samassékou, the lone returning Olympian from the previous Games, sprinter and opening ceremony flag bearer Djénébou Danté, and taekwondo fighter and 2015 world bronze medalist Ismaël Coulibaly, who led the squad as the most successful member and the nation's flag bearer in the closing ceremony. Mali, however, has yet to win its first ever Olympic medal.

== Athletics (track and field) ==
Mali has received universality slots from IAAF to send two athletes (one male and one female) to the Olympics.

Key

- Note–Ranks given for track events are within the athlete's heat only
- Q = Qualified for the next round
- q = Qualified for the next round as a fastest loser or, in field events, by position without achieving the qualifying target
- NR = National record
- N/A = Round not applicable for the event
- Bye = Athlete not required to compete in round

Track & road events

Athlete	Event	Heat		Semifinal		Final	
Athlete	Event	Time	Rank	Time	Rank	Time	Rank
Djénébou Danté	Women's 400 m	52.85	5	Did not advance			

Field events

Athlete	Event	Qualification		Final	
Athlete	Event	Distance	Position	Distance	Position
Mamadou Chérif Dia	Men's triple jump	16.47	24	Did not advance	

== Judo ==
Mali has qualified one judoka for the men's half-heavyweight category (100 kg) at the Games. Ayouba Traore earned a continental quota spot from the African region, as the highest-ranked Malian judoka outside of direct qualifying position in the IJF World Ranking List of May 30, 2016.

Athlete	Event	Round of 64	Round of 32	Round of 16	Quarterfinals	Semifinals	Repechage	Final / BM	
Athlete	Event	Opposition Result	Opposition Result	Opposition Result	Opposition Result	Opposition Result	Opposition Result	Opposition Result	Rank
Ayouba Traoré	Men's −100 kg	Bye	Maret (FRA); L 000–100	Did not advance					

== Swimming ==
Mali has received a Universality invitation from FINA to send two swimmers (one male and one female) to the Olympics.

Athlete	Event	Heat		Semifinal		Final	
Athlete	Event	Time	Rank	Time	Rank	Time	Rank
Oumar Touré	Men's 100 m butterfly	57.56	41	Did not advance			
Fatoumata Samassékou	Women's 50 m freestyle	33.71	=81	Did not advance			

== Taekwondo ==
Mali entered one athlete into the taekwondo competition at the Olympics. 2015 Worlds bronze medalist Ismaël Coulibaly secured a spot in the men's welterweight category (80 kg) by virtue of his top two finish at the 2016 African Qualification Tournament in Agadir, Morocco.

Athlete	Event	Round of 16	Quarterfinals	Semifinals	Repechage	Final / BM	
Athlete	Event	Opposition Result	Opposition Result	Opposition Result	Opposition Result	Opposition Result	Rank
Ismaël Coulibaly	Men's −80 kg	Beigi (AZE); L 6–13	Did not advance				
