= Dramane =

Dramane is a given name. Notable people with the name include:

- Alassane Dramane Ouattara (born 1942), Ivorian politician
- Aminata Dramane Traoré (born 1942), Malian author, politician, and political activist
- Dramane Coulibaly (born 1979), Malian football player
- Dramane Dembélé, Malian politician
- Dramane Diarra (born 1980), French basketball player
- Dramane Kamaté (born 1985), Malian football player
- Dramane Konaté, (born 1994), Ivorian football player
- Dramane Koné (born 1980), drummer and griot from Burkina Faso
- Dramane Nikièma (born 1988), Burkinabé football player
- Dramane Salou (born 1998), Burkinabé football player
- Dramane Sereme (born 1942), Malian athlete
- Dramane Traoré (born 1982), Malian football player
