= Mali at the Olympics =

- IOC code: MLI
- NOC: Comité National Olympique et Sportif du Mali
- Medals: Gold 0 Silver 0 Bronze 0 Total 0

Summer appearances
- 1964; 1968; 1972; 1976; 1980; 1984; 1988; 1992; 1996; 2000; 2004; 2008; 2012; 2016; 2020; 2024; 2028

Mali has sent athletes to Summer Olympic Games held in 1964, 1968, 1972, and every other Olympics since 1980, although the country has never won an Olympic medal. No athletes from Mali have competed in any Winter Olympic Games. Its best finish is 5th, courtesy of a quarterfinal finish by the men's football team at the 2004 Summer Olympics, and by taekwondo athlete Daba Modibo Keïta at the men's +80 kg event at the 2012 Summer Olympics.

The National Olympic Committee for Mali was formed in 1962 and recognized by the International Olympic Committee in 1963.

== Medal tables ==
=== Medals by Summer Games ===
Games	Athletes	Gold	Silver	Bronze	Total	Rank
1964 Tokyo	2	0	0	0	0	–
1968 Mexico City	2	0	0	0	0	–
1972 Munich	3	0	0	0	0	–
1976 Montreal	boycotted					
1980 Moscow	7	0	0	0	0	–
1984 Los Angeles	4	0	0	0	0	–
1988 Seoul	6	0	0	0	0	–
1992 Barcelona	5	0	0	0	0	–
1996 Atlanta	3	0	0	0	0	–
2000 Sydney	5	0	0	0	0	–
2004 Athens	23	0	0	0	0	–
2008 Beijing	17	0	0	0	0	–
2012 London	6	0	0	0	0	–
2016 Rio de Janeiro	6	0	0	0	0	–
2020 Tokyo	4	0	0	0	0	–
2024 Paris	23	0	0	0	0	–
2028 Los Angeles	future event					
2032 Brisbane	future event					
Total		0	0	0	0	–

== See also ==
- List of flag bearers for Mali at the Olympics
- Mali at the Paralympics
