= Chika Chukwumerije =

Nigerian taekwondo practitioner

Medal record

Representing Nigeria

Men's taekwondo

Olympic Games
Bronze medal – third place	2008 Beijing	+80kg

All-Africa Games
Gold medal – first place	2007 Algiers	+80kg
Silver medal – second place	2011 Maputo	+80kg
Bronze medal – third place	2003 Abuja	+80kg

Chika Yagazie Chukwumerije (born 30 December 1983) is a male taekwondo practitioner from Nigeria. The son of Nigerian politician Uche Chukwumerije, Chika first drew attention in 2003 during the qualifiers for the 2003 All-Africa Games, where he eventually won a bronze medal in the Heavyweight Male category. He qualified for the 2004 Summer Olympics in Athens, but lost his first bout to Pascal Gentil, the eventual bronze medal winner. Nevertheless, after a period of intensive training that was funded by his father, he became one of Nigeria's best chances for a medal at the 2008 Summer Olympics in Beijing. He won a gold medal at the 2007 All-Africa Games in the +80 kg class and qualified for the 2008 Olympic Games soon after. Although he lost to eventual silver-medal winner Alexandros Nikolaidis in the semifinals of the +80kg event, he was entered into the repechage round of the tournament. Here, after defeating Akmal Irgashev of Uzbekistan he claimed a bronze medal in the event, Nigeria's third medal of the tournament. Four years later he competed at the 2012 Summer Olympics, but did not make it past his first bout.

== Early life ==
Chukwumerije was born on 30 December 1983 in Nigeria. His father, Uche Chukwumerije, was a national senator and Information Minister of Nigeria. Chika had his primary education at St. Jude's Private School in Festac Town, Lagos and received his undergraduate degree in mechanical engineering from the Federal University of Technology Owerri (FUTO) in Nigeria in 2005. During this time he competed in taekwondo at three University Games held by the Nigerian University Games Association, winning bronze in 2000 and gold in 2002 and 2004. He first became a national champion in 2002 and held the title through 2011, undefeated in nine years.

== International career ==
Chukwumerije first garnered attention while training for the 2003 All-Africa Games that were held in Abuja, Nigeria. During the qualifications, he and partner Friday Dirisu fought hard against Lucky Ojemudia and Micheal Obiora to win the two spots in their weight categories. He won a bronze medal in the Heavyweight Male category, along with Ngala Munayi of Kenya.

Chukwumerije was chosen for the 2004 Summer Olympics in Athens at the Olympic qualifiers in Cairo, Egypt in late January 2004. He came in second in the regional qualifications, behind only Abdelkader Zrouri of Morocco. He finished in 11th place in the men's +80 kg event after failing to advance beyond the preliminary round. He was defeated by Pascal Gentil of France, the eventual bronze medalist in the event. Despite this, he was considered by several sources to be one of Nigeria's best medal prospects at the 2008 Summer Olympics in Beijing, citing the amount of training he had undertaken and the experience that he had gained since the last Olympics. His father had paid for him, as well as fellow taekwondo practitioner Isa Adamu, to be trained in the United States and Europe and compete globally. This financial backing was unavailable to most other Nigerian athletes. Chukwumerije spent six weeks training in the United States, although the American embassy refused to grant his training partner Adamu a visa. They did, however, train together in Manchester and worked with coach Osita A. Green. They also trained in Taiwan and Germany.

At the 2007 All-Africa Games in Algiers, Algeria, both Chukwumerije and Adamu won gold medals in taekwondo, the former in the +80 kg class. They then headed to Tripoli, Libya, where they earned their qualification tickets for the Beijing Olympics. Despite having lauded Nigerian athletes in the past, two days before his event, he proclaimed his "disappointment" at the performance of the Nigerian national team who, at that point, had not won a single medal at the games. He did, however, praise the Nigeria national football team, who ended up in second place in the men's tournament. The next day, however, Nigeria won bronze medals in the women's 4x100 metre relay and the women's long jump.

Competing in the men's +80kg event, Chukwumerije defeated Vietnam's Nguyen Van Hung in the preliminary rounds. He defeated Mali's Daba Modibo Keïta in the quarterfinals, but lost to Greece's Alexandros Nikolaidis, the eventual silver medal winner in the event. In the repechage, he defeated Akmal Irgashev of Uzbekistan to claim one of two bronze medals. The other went to Arman Chilmanov of Kazakhstan. In doing so, he earned an incentive offered by LG Electronics, who offered to furnish the home of any Nigerian Olympic competitor who won a medal.

An injury cost Chukwumerije his title at the 2011 All-Africa Games in Maputo, Mozambique, where he settled for silver in the men's heavyweight category. He recovered from this problem, but then sustained two fractures to his foot while qualifying for the 2012 Summer Olympics. At the London Games he participated in the men's +80kg division, but lost his first bout against Robelis Despaigne of Cuba, an eventual bronze medalist. He was also team captain at the 2014 Commonwealth taekwondo championships, where he won a silver medal after pulling out of the final against Mahama Cho of Great Britain due to injury.

== Personal life ==
In 2007 Chukwumerije was a contestant on Survivor Africa: Panama and was the fifth person to be voted out. In September 2009 he entered the University of Liverpool for a one-year degree program in Operations and Supply Chain Management and graduated in 2010 with a Master of Science degree. During his time there he was active in the institution's sporting culture and participated in volleyball, basketball, and taekwondo. In 2009 Chukwumerije was inducted into the World's Taekwondo Hall of Fame in New Jersey as an "Outstanding Male African Olympic Player". In October 2012 Nigeria hosted the first Chika Chukwumerije Sports Foundation international taekwondo championship to further the foundation's mission of producing world-class taekwondo practitioners from West Africa by combating "the lack of constant exposure to world class tournaments, training camps, equipment and training methodologies".
