= Mali at the 2004 Summer Olympics =

- IOC code: MLI
- NOC: Comité National Olympique et Sportif du Mali

in Athens
- Competitors: 23 in 4 sports
- Flag bearer: Kadiatou Camara
- Medals: Gold 0 Silver 0 Bronze 0 Total 0

Summer Olympics appearances (overview)
- 1964; 1968; 1972; 1976; 1980; 1984; 1988; 1992; 1996; 2000; 2004; 2008; 2012; 2016; 2020; 2024

Mali competed at the 2004 Summer Olympics in Athens, Greece, from 13 to 29 August 2004.

== Athletics ==
Malian athletes have so far achieved qualifying standards in the following athletics events (up to a maximum of 3 athletes in each event at the 'A' Standard, and 1 at the 'B' Standard).

Men

| Athlete | Event | Heat | | Semifinal | | Final | |
| Athlete | Event | Result | Rank | Result | Rank | Result | Rank |
|---|---|---|---|---|---|---|---|
| Ibrahima Maiga | 400 m hurdles | 50.63 | 6 | did not advance | | | |

Women

| Athlete | Event | Heat | | Quarterfinal | | Semifinal | | Final | |
| Athlete | Event | Result | Rank | Result | Rank | Result | Rank | Result | Rank |
|---|---|---|---|---|---|---|---|---|---|
| Kadiatou Camara | 200 m | 23.56 | 6 | did not advance | | | | | |

Key

- Note–Ranks given for track events are within the athlete's heat only
- Q = Qualified for the next round
- q = Qualified for the next round as a fastest loser or, in field events, by position without achieving the qualifying target
- NR = National record
- N/A = Round not applicable for the event
- Bye = Athlete not required to compete in round

== Football ==
Mali men's national football team managed to qualify for the Olympics after winning a close final game against Cameroon, leaving them atop the group by just a single point.

=== Men's tournament ===
Roster

The following is the Malian squad in the men's football tournament of the 2004 Summer Olympics.

Head coach: Cheick Oumar Koné

| No. | Pos. | Player | Date of birth (age) | Caps | Goals | 2004 club |
|---|---|---|---|---|---|---|
| 1 | GK | Fousseiny Tangara* | 12 June 1978 (aged 26) | 0 | 0 | (French Football Federation) FC Mantes |
| 2 | FW | Mamadi Berthe | 17 January 1983 (aged 21) | 0 | 0 | (French Football Federation) Sedan |
| 3 | DF | Adama Tamboura | 18 May 1985 (aged 19) | 0 | 0 | (Malian Football Federation) Djoliba AC |
| 4 | DF | Moussa Coulibaly | 15 September 1981 (aged 22) | 0 | 0 | (Malian Football Federation) AS Bamako |
| 5 | DF | Boubacar Koné | 21 August 1984 (aged 19) | 0 | 0 | (Malian Football Federation) AS Bamako |
| 6 | DF | Boucader Diallo | 14 September 1984 (aged 19) | 0 | 0 | (Malian Football Federation) Stade Malien |
| 7 | FW | Tenema N'Diaye | 13 February 1981 (aged 23) | 0 | 0 | (Tunisian Football Federation) CS Sfaxien |
| 8 | MF | Abdou Traore | 5 August 1981 (aged 23) | 0 | 0 | (Malian Football Federation) Djoliba AC |
| 9 | MF | Rafan Sidibé | 12 March 1984 (aged 20) | 0 | 0 | (Malian Football Federation) Stade Malien |
| 10 | MF | Mintou Doucouré | 19 July 1982 (aged 22) | 0 | 0 | (Malian Football Federation) JS Centre Setif Keita |
| 11 | FW | Sédonoudé Abouta | 1 January 1981 (aged 23) | 0 | 0 | (Malian Football Federation) Djoliba AC |
| 12 | DF | Drissa Diakité | 18 February 1985 (aged 19) | 0 | 0 | (Malian Football Federation) Djoliba AC |
| 13 | FW | Dramane Traoré | 17 June 1982 (aged 22) | 0 | 0 | (Egyptian Football Association) Ismaily SC |
| 14 | MF | Mohamed Sissoko | 22 January 1985 (aged 19) | 0 | 0 | (Royal Spanish Football Federation) Valencia |
| 15 | MF | Jimmy Kébé | 19 January 1984 (aged 20) | 0 | 0 | (French Football Federation) Lens |
| 16 | GK | Soumbeïla Diakité | 25 August 1984 (aged 19) | 0 | 0 | (Malian Football Federation) Stade Malien |
| 17 | FW | Mamadou Diallo | 17 April 1982 (aged 22) | 0 | 0 | (Algerian Football Federation) USM Alger |
| 18 | GK | Cheick Bathily | 10 October 1982 (aged 21) | 0 | 0 | (Malian Football Federation) Djoliba AC |

* Over-aged player.

Group play

| Pos | Team | Pld | W | D | L | GF | GA | GD | Pts | Qualification |
|---|---|---|---|---|---|---|---|---|---|---|
| 1 | Mali | 3 | 1 | 2 | 0 | 5 | 3 | +2 | 5 | Qualified for the quarterfinals |
| 2 | South Korea | 3 | 1 | 2 | 0 | 6 | 5 | +1 | 5 | Qualified for the quarterfinals |
| 3 | Mexico | 3 | 1 | 1 | 1 | 3 | 3 | 0 | 4 | |
| 4 | Greece | 3 | 0 | 1 | 2 | 4 | 7 | −3 | 1 | |

11 August 2004
20:30

| Mali | 0–0 | Mexico |
|---|---|---|
| | Report |

Panthessaliko Stadium, Volos
Attendance: 10,104
Referee: Subkhiddin Mohd Salleh (Malaysia)

14 August 2004
20:30

| Greece | 0–2 | Mali |
|---|---|---|
| | Report | Berthe 2'; N'Diaye 45' |

Kaftanzoglio Stadium, Thessaloniki
Attendance: 17,123
Referee: Carlos Torres (Paraguay)

17 August 2004
20:30

| South Korea | 3–3 | Mali |
|---|---|---|
| Cho J.J. 57', 59'; Tamboura 64' (o.g.) | Report | N'Diaye 7', 24', 55' |

Kaftanzoglio Stadium, Thessaloniki
Attendance: 3,320
Referee: Éric Poulat (France)

Quarterfinals

21 August 2004
18:00

| Mali | 0–1 (a.e.t.) | Italy |
|---|---|---|
| | Report | Bovo 116' |

Karaiskaki Stadium, Piraeus
Attendance: 27,543
Referee: Carlos Torres (Paraguay)

== Judo ==
One Malian judoka qualified for the 2004 Summer Olympics.

| Athlete | Event | Round of 32 | Round of 16 | Quarterfinals | Semifinals | Repechage 1 | Repechage 2 | Repechage 3 | Final / BM | |
| Athlete | Event | Opposition Result | Opposition Result | Opposition Result | Opposition Result | Opposition Result | Opposition Result | Opposition Result | Opposition Result | Rank |
|---|---|---|---|---|---|---|---|---|---|---|
| Bourama Mariko | Men's −73 kg | Baștea (ROM); L 0000–0210 | did not advance | | | | | | | |

== Swimming ==
Men

| Athlete | Event | Heat | | Semifinal | | Final | |
| Athlete | Event | Time | Rank | Time | Rank | Time | Rank |
|---|---|---|---|---|---|---|---|
| David Keita | 50 m freestyle | 29.96 | 79 | did not advance | | | |

Women

| Athlete | Event | Heat | | Semifinal | | Final | |
| Athlete | Event | Time | Rank | Time | Rank | Time | Rank |
|---|---|---|---|---|---|---|---|
| Mariam Pauline Keita | 100 m breaststroke | 1:30.40 | 46 | did not advance | | | |
