= Emberger =

Emberger is a German language habitational surname. Notable people with the name include:

- Dick Emberger (1938), American athlete
- Louis Emberger (1897–1969), French botanist and phytogeographer
