= Dramane Sereme =

Malian decathlete (born 1942)

Personal information
- Nationality: Malian
- Born: 23 May 1942 (age 83)

Sport
- Sport: Athletics
- Event: Decathlon

Dramane Sereme (born 23 May 1942) is a Malian decathlete. Sereme would compete at the 1964 Summer Olympics, representing Mali in men's athletics. Here, he would be one of the first Malian athletes to compete at an Olympic Games.

At the 1964 Summer Games, he would compete in the men's decathlon over a course of two days. Overall, he would place last out of the 18 competitors that completed the event. Later on, he would be awarded the Medal of Sporting Merit by the National Olympic and Sports Committee of Mali due to his service in sport.

== Biography ==
Dramane Sereme was born on 23 May 1942. Sereme would compete at the 1964 Summer Olympics in Tokyo, Japan, representing Mali in men's athletics. Here, he would be one of the two Malian athletes to compete at an Olympic Games for the nation's first appearance at an Olympic Games.

From 19 to 20 December, he would compete in the men's decathlon against 22 other competitors in the event. The athletes in the event would first compete in the 100 metres, where Sereme would place equal ninth with a time of 11.1, earning 780 points. They would then compete in the long jump; Sereme would record a distance of 6.51 metres and placed 16th in the event, earning 717 points. In the shot put, he would record a distance of 11.03 metres and placed 20th in the event, earning 504 points. He would then compete in the high jump portion of the event, recording a distance of 1.60 metres. He would place 21st, last out of all of the competitors that remained in the event after some had dropped out. He would earn 493 points. His last event for the first day would be the 400 metres, recording a time of 51.2 seconds and placed 15th in the event with 753 points.

The following day of the competition, they would compete in the 110 metre hurdles. There, Sereme would record a time of 16.4 seconds and would place 16th in the event with 712 points. For the discus, he would place last in the event with a distance of 29.24 metres, earning 456 points. In the pole vault, he would again place last in the event with a distance of 2.60 metres, earning 403 points. He would place 16th in the javelin with a distance of 48.46 metres, earning 612 points. The last event of the competition would be the 1500 metres, there he would place 14th in the event with a time of 4:51.5, earning 456 points. Overall, Sereme would place last out of the 18 competitors that completed in the event with a total of 5917 points.

Later on, he would be awarded the Medal of Sporting Merit by the National Olympic and Sports Committee of Mali in 2023 due to his service in sport.
