= Mykhaylo Storozhenko =

Soviet decathlete (1937–2020)

Mykhailo Storozhenko
Personal information
- Nationality: Soviet
- Born: 12 November 1937; Saint Petersburg, Soviet Union
- Died: 30 March 2020 (aged 82)

Sport
- Sport: Athletics
- Event: Decathlon

Mykhailo Storozhenko (12 November 1937 – 30 March 2020) was a Soviet athlete. He competed in the men's decathlon at the 1964 Summer Olympics.
