= Mali at the 1988 Summer Olympics =

- IOC code: MLI
- NOC: Comité National Olympique et Sportif du Mali

in Seoul
- Competitors: 6 in 3 sports
- Flag bearer: Mamadou Keita
- Medals: Gold 0 Silver 0 Bronze 0 Total 0

Summer Olympics appearances (overview)
- 1964; 1968; 1972; 1976; 1980; 1984; 1988; 1992; 1996; 2000; 2004; 2008; 2012; 2016; 2020; 2024

Mali competed at the 1988 Summer Olympics in Seoul, South Korea.

== Competitors ==
The following is the list of number of competitors in the Games.

Sport	Men	Women	Total
Athletics	2	1	3
Boxing	1	–	1
Judo	2	–	2
Total	5	1	6

== Athletics ==
Men
Track and road events

Athlete	Event	Heat Round 1		Heat Round 2		Semifinal		Final	
Athlete	Event	Time	Rank	Time	Rank	Time	Rank	Time	Rank
Ousmane Diarra	100 metres	10.53	38 Q	10.61	37	Did not advance			
Ousmane Diarra	200 metres	21.55	39 q	21.46	29	Did not advance			
Yaya Seyba	400 metres	48.83	59	Did not advance					

Women
Track and road events

Athlete	Event	Heat Round 1		Heat Round 2		Semifinal		Final	
Athlete	Event	Time	Rank	Time	Rank	Time	Rank	Time	Rank
Aminata Diarra	100 metres	12.27	55	Did not advance					
Aminata Diarra	200 metres	25.81	54	Did not advance					

== Boxing ==
Athlete	Event	Round of 64	Round of 32	Round of 16	Quarterfinals	Semifinals	Final	
Athlete	Event	Opposition Result	Opposition Result	Opposition Result	Opposition Result	Opposition Result	Opposition Result	Rank
Kassim Traoré	Lightweight	Bye	Pelly (SUD); W 5–0	Ellis (USA); L RSC R2	Did not advance			

== Judo ==
Athlete	Event	Round of 64	Round of 32	Round of 16	Quarterfinals	Semifinals	Repechage			Final	
Athlete	Event	Round of 64	Round of 32	Round of 16	Quarterfinals	Semifinals	Round 1	Round 2	Round 3	Final	
Athlete	Event	Opposition Result	Opposition Result	Opposition Result	Opposition Result	Opposition Result	Opposition Result	Opposition Result	Opposition Result	Opposition Result	Rank
Mamadou Keita	65 kg	Bye	Bujkó (HUN); L Ippon	Did not advance							
Ousmane Camara	71 kg	Bye	Alexandre (FRA); L Ippon	Did not advance			Hajtós (HUN); L Ippon	Did not advance			
