= Mali at the 1968 Summer Olympics =

- IOC code: MLI
- NOC: Comité National Olympique et Sportif du Mali

in Mexico City
- Competitors: 1 in 1 sport
- Medals: Gold 0 Silver 0 Bronze 0 Total 0

Summer Olympics appearances (overview)
- 1964; 1968; 1972; 1976; 1980; 1984; 1988; 1992; 1996; 2000; 2004; 2008; 2012; 2016; 2020; 2024

Mali competed at the 1968 Summer Olympics in Mexico City, Mexico.

== Results by athlete ==
=== Boxing ===
Light-heavyweight (81 kg)

- Soungalo Bagayogo — Round 1: lost to Kurt Baumgartner (AUT), 3:2
