= Rein Aun =

Estonian athlete (1940–1995)

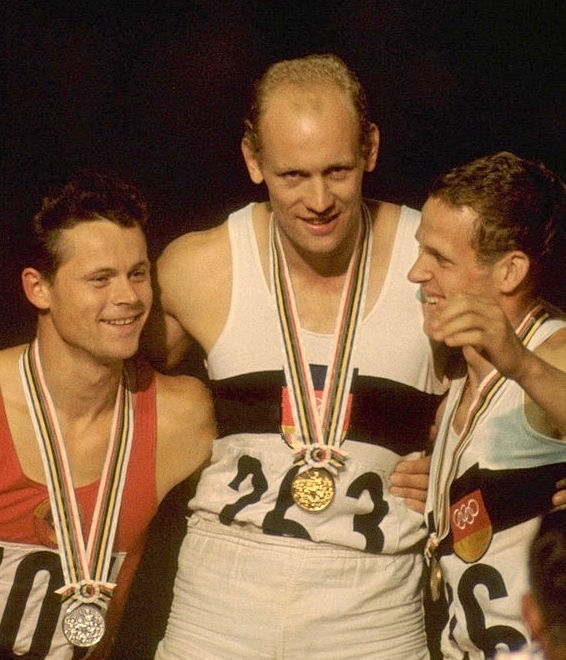
- Rein Aun (left) at the 1964 Olympics

Personal information
- Born: Rein Aun; 5 October 1940 Tallinn, Estonia
- Died: 11 March 1995 (aged 54) Tallinn, Estonia
- Height: 1.89 m (6 ft 2 in)
- Weight: 88 kg (194 lb)

Sport
- Sport: Athletics
- Event: Decathlon
- Club: Kalev Tartu
- Coached by: Vladimir Zulin

Achievements and titles
- Personal best: 7898 (1968)
Medal record
Men's athletics
Representing the Soviet Union
Olympic Games
Silver medal – second place	1964 Tokyo	Decathlon

Rein Aun (5 October 1940 – 11 March 1995) was a multitalented Estonian athlete. He competed for the Soviet Union in the decathlon at the 1964 and 1968 Olympics, winning a silver medal in 1964.

Aun was born in a family of five brothers and one sister. Their father died when Aun was just 13. He attended a sports school, where he trained in long-distance running before changing to decathlon. His 1964 Olympic medal was his only international success. Domestically, he held the Soviet decathlon titles in 1967–68 and finished second in 1964. In his native Estonia he was a multiple champion in various athletics events and even in volleyball in 1958. In retirement he coached athletics and served as the secretary-general of the Estonian Athletics Association.
