= Teemu Heino =

Finnish taekwondo practitioner

Personal information
- Full name: Teemu Olavi Heino
- Nationality: Finland
- Born: 15 December 1976 (age 49) Kokemäki, Finland
- Height: 1.96 m (6 ft 5 in)
- Weight: 97 kg (214 lb)

Sport
- Sport: Taekwondo
- Event: +80 kg
- Club: Kokemäen Taekwondo
- Coached by: Pia Aaltonen
Medal record
Men's taekwondo
Representing Finland
European Championships
| Silver medal – second place | 2005 Riga | +84 kg |
| Bronze medal – third place | 2000 Patras | +84 kg |
| Bronze medal – third place | 2002 Samsun | +84 kg |

Teemu Olavi Heino (born 15 December 1976 in Kokemäki) is a Finnish taekwondo practitioner, who competed in the men's heavyweight category. He claimed three medals (one silver and two bronze) in the over-84 kg category at the European Championships since 2002, and represented his nation Finland at the 2004 Summer Olympics. Throughout his sporting career, Heino trained full-time for Kokemäen Taekwondo Club in his native Kokemäki, under head coach and master Pia Aaltonen.

Heino qualified as a lone taekwondo fighter for the Finnish squad in the men's heavyweight class (+80 kg) at the 2004 Summer Olympics in Athens, by granting a berth and placing third from the European Olympic Qualifying Tournament in Baku, Azerbaijan. He rounded off a dismal display in a 5–8 defeat to Vietnam's Nguyen Van Hung in the opening match. With his Vietnamese opponent losing to Jordan's Ibrahim Kamal in the quarterfinals, Heino slipped his chances away to compete for an Olympic bronze medal in the repechage.

In 2005, Heino improved his ill-fated Olympic feat to satisfy a silver in the final match 8–10 against French fighter and two-time Olympic bronze medalist Pascal Gentil at the European Championships in Riga, Latvia, adding his accolade to a set of two bronze medals obtained in 2000 and 2002. Heino sought a bid on his second attempt for the 2008 and 2012 Summer Olympics, but failed to move beyond the opening round at the World and European Qualifying Tournaments.

Since his Olympic debut in 2004, Heino served as the member and chairman of the athletes' commission under the Finnish Olympic Committee for four years.
