= Mariatou Diarra =

Malian basketball player (born 1985)

Mariatou Diarra (born November 20, 1985) is a Malian women's basketball player. Diarra competed for Mali at the 2008 Summer Olympics, where she scored 2 in 3 games. She was born in Bamako and plays in Senegal for Dakar Université Club.
