= Mali at the 1996 Summer Olympics =

- IOC code: MLI
- NOC: Comité National Olympique et Sportif du Mali

in Atlanta
- Competitors: 3 in 1 sport
- Flag bearer: Monique Ross
- Medals: Gold 0 Silver 0 Bronze 0 Total 0

Summer Olympics appearances (overview)
- 1964; 1968; 1972; 1976; 1980; 1984; 1988; 1992; 1996; 2000; 2004; 2008; 2012; 2016; 2020; 2024

Mali competed at the 1996 Summer Olympics in Atlanta, United States.

== Competitors ==
The following is the list of number of competitors in the Games.

Sport	Men	Women	Total
Athletics	1	2	3
Total	1	2	3

== Results by event ==
=== Athletics ===
==== Men ====
Track and road events

Athletes	Events	Heat Round 1		Heat Round 2		Semifinal		Final	
Athletes	Events	Time	Rank	Time	Rank	Time	Rank	Time	Rank
Ousmane Diarra	100 metres	10.34	27 Q	10.38	31	did not advance			
Ousmane Diarra	200 metres	21.20	60	did not advance					

==== Women ====
Track and road events

Athletes	Events	Heat Round 1		Heat Round 2		Semifinal		Final	
Athletes	Events	Time	Rank	Time	Rank	Time	Rank	Time	Rank
Aminata Camara	100 metres hurdles	14.94	41	did not advance					

Field events

Athlete	Event	Qualification		Final	
Athlete	Event	Result	Rank	Result	Rank
Oumou Traoré	Discus throw	39.70	39	did not advance	
