= Mamadou Soumaré =

Malian swimmer

Personal information
- Born: January 1, 1992 (age 34)

Sport
- Sport: Swimming

Mamadou A. Soumaré (born 1 January 1992) is a swimmer who competed for Mali at the 2012 Summer Olympics in the Men's 100m freestyle event. He finished first in Heat 1 against swimmers from the Maldives, Tanzania, and Burundi; and placed, overall, 52nd with his time of 57.32 seconds. However, he did not advance to the next round.

He set Malian short course records in the men's 200 m freestyle (2:10.52 set at the 2012 World Championships), 100 m medley (1:11.39 set at the 2014 World Championships), and long course records in the men's 200 m freestyle (2:14.06 set at the 2011 African Games).
