= Oumar Koné (judoka) =

Malian judoka (born 1985)

Personal information
- Born: 11 February 1985 (age 40)
- Occupation: Judoka

Sport
- Sport: Judo

Profile at external databases
- IJF: 3215
- JudoInside.com: 67478

Oumar Koné (born 11 February 1985) is a Malian judoka. He competed for Mali at the 2012 Summer Olympics in the Men's 100 kg event but lost to Luciano Corrêa in the first round.
