= Mali at the 1984 Summer Olympics =

- IOC code: MLI
- NOC: Comité National Olympique et Sportif du Mali

in Los Angeles
- Competitors: 4
- Flag bearer: Karamoke Kory Konte
- Medals: Gold 0 Silver 0 Bronze 0 Total 0

Summer Olympics appearances (overview)
- 1964; 1968; 1972; 1976; 1980; 1984; 1988; 1992; 1996; 2000; 2004; 2008; 2012; 2016; 2020; 2024

Mali competed at the 1984 Summer Olympics in Los Angeles, United States.

== Results by event ==
=== Athletics ===
Men's Long Jump

- Abdoulaye Traoré

- Qualification — 6.92 m (22 ft 8 in) (→ did not advance, 25th place)

=== Judo ===
Men's 78kg

- Paul Diop — T20
