= Mali at the 2024 Summer Olympics =

- IOC code: MLI
- NOC: Comité National Olympique et Sportif du Mali

in Paris, France 26 July 2024 – 11 August 2024
- Competitors: 23 (21 men and 2 women) in 5 sports
- Flag bearers: Alexien Kouma & Marine Camara
- Medals: Gold 0 Silver 0 Bronze 0 Total 0

Summer Olympics appearances (overview)
- 1964; 1968; 1972; 1976; 1980; 1984; 1988; 1992; 1996; 2000; 2004; 2008; 2012; 2016; 2020; 2024

Mali competed at the 2024 Summer Olympics in Paris from 26 July to 11 August 2024. It has participated in every edition of the summer Olympics since the nation's official debut in 1964, with the exception of the 1976 Summer Olympics in Montreal because of the African boycott.

== Competitors ==
The following is the list of number of competitors in the Games. Note that reserves in football are not counted:

Sport	Men	Women	Total
Athletics	1	0	1
Boxing	0	1	1
Football	18	0	18
Swimming	1	1	2
Taekwondo	1	0	1
Total	21	2	23

== Athletics ==
Mali sent one sprinter to compete at the 2024 Summer Olympics.

Key

- Note–Ranks given for track events are within the athlete's heat only
- Q = Qualified for the next round
- q = Qualified for the next round as a fastest loser or, in field events, by position without achieving the qualifying target
- NR = National record
- N/A = Round not applicable for the event
- Bye = Athlete not required to compete in round

Track events

Athlete	Event	Preliminaries		Heat		Repechage		Semifinal		Final	
Athlete	Event	Result	Rank	Result	Rank	Result	Rank	Result	Rank	Result	Rank
Fodé Sissoko	Men's 100 m	10.66	3	Did not advance							

== Boxing ==
Mali entered one female boxer into the Olympic tournament. Marine Camara (women's featheweight) secured her spots in her division, through receiving the allocations of universality spots, signifying the nation’s return to the sport for the first time since 1988.

Athlete	Event	Round of 32	Round of 16	Quarterfinals	Semifinals	Final	
Athlete	Event	Opposition Result	Opposition Result	Opposition Result	Opposition Result	Opposition Result	Rank
Marine Camara	Women's 57 kg	Yıldız (TUR); L 0–5	Did not advance				

== Football ==
Summary

Key:

- A.E.T – After extra time.
- P – Match decided by penalty-shootout.

Team	Event	Group Stage				Quarterfinal	Semifinal	Final / BM	
Team	Event	Opposition Score	Opposition Score	Opposition Score	Rank	Opposition Score	Opposition Score	Opposition Score	Rank
Mali men's	Men's tournament	Israel; D 1–1	Japan; L 1–0	Paraguay; L 1–0	3	Did not advance			

=== Men's tournament ===
Mali men's football team qualified for the Olympics by winning the decision play-off against Guinea for the last of three available spots at the 2023 U-23 Africa Cup of Nations in Rabat, Morocco, marking the country's return to the sport for the first time in two decades.

Team roster

Mali announced their final squad on 8 July 2024.

Head coach: Alou Badra Diallo

No.	Pos.	Player	Date of birth (age)	Club
1	GK	Lassine Diarra	11 November 2002 (aged 21)	(French Football Federation) Lyon
2	DF	Fodé Doucouré	3 February 2001 (aged 23)	(French Football Federation) Red Star
3	DF	Hamidou Diallo	26 January 2002 (aged 22)	(Portuguese Football Federation) Farense
4	DF	Mamadou Tounkara	14 December 2001 (aged 22)	(Portuguese Football Federation) Vitória de Guimarães
5	DF	Ibrahima Cissé	15 February 2001 (aged 23)	(German Football Association) Schalke 04
6	MF	Coli Saco	15 May 2002 (aged 22)	(Italian Football Federation) Ancona
7	FW	Wilson Samaké	30 March 2004 (aged 20)	(French Football Federation) Rennes
8	MF	Boubacar Traoré (captain)	20 August 2001 (aged 22)	(The Football Association) Wolverhampton Wanderers
9	FW	Cheickna Doumbia	14 June 2003 (aged 21)	(United Arab Emirates Football Association) Shabab Al-Ahli
10	MF	Salam Jiddou*	1 February 2000 (aged 24)	(Algerian Football Federation) ES Sétif
11	FW	Thiemoko Diarra	19 April 2003 (aged 21)	(French Football Federation) Châteauroux
12	MF	Issouf Sissokho	30 January 2002 (aged 22)	(French Football Federation) Bordeaux
13	MF	Brahima Diarra	5 July 2003 (aged 21)	(The Football Association) Huddersfield Town
14	FW	Demba Diallo*	13 October 2000 (aged 23)	(Turkish Football Federation) Manisa
15	DF	Mohamed Cisset	28 May 2004 (aged 20)	(United States Soccer Federation) Penn State Nittany Lions
16	GK	Oumar Coulibaly	19 December 2002 (aged 21)	(Malian Football Federation) CO Bamako
17	DF	Ahmed Diomandé	15 December 2002 (aged 21)	(Royal Moroccan Football Federation) Ittifaq Marrakech
18	MF	Moussa Diakité	4 November 2003 (aged 20)	(Royal Spanish Football Federation) Cádiz

* Overage player.

Group play

Pos	Team	Pld	W	D	L	GF	GA	GD	Pts	Qualification
1	Japan	3	3	0	0	7	0	+7	9	Advance to knockout stage
2	Paraguay	3	2	0	1	5	7	−2	6	Advance to knockout stage
3	Mali	3	0	1	2	1	3	−2	1	
4	Israel	3	0	1	2	3	6	−3	1	

Source: FIFA
Rules for classification: Group stage tiebreakers
24 July 2024
21:00

Mali	1–1	Israel
Doumbia 63'	Report	H. Diallo 56' (o.g.)

Parc des Princes, Paris
Attendance: 26,305
Referee: Campbell-Kirk Kawana-Waugh (New Zealand)

27 July 2024
21:00

Japan	1–0	Mali
Yamamoto 82'	Report

Stade de Bordeaux, Bordeaux
Attendance: 9,893
Referee: Edina Alves Batista (Brazil)

30 July 2024
21:00

Paraguay	1–0	Mali
M. Fernández 5'	Report

Parc des Princes, Paris
Attendance: 35,736
Referee: Ilgiz Tantashev (Uzbekistan)

== Swimming ==
Mali sent two swimmers to compete at the 2024 Paris Olympics.

Athlete	Event	Heat		Semifinal		Final	
Athlete	Event	Time	Rank	Time	Rank	Time	Rank
Alexien Kouma	Men's 100 m freestyle	56.34	74	Did not advance			
Aichata Diabate	Women's 50 m freestyle	37.55	77	Did not advance			

Qualifiers for the latter rounds (Q) of all events were decided on a time only basis, therefore positions shown are overall results versus competitors in all heats.

== Taekwondo ==
Mali entered one athlete to compete at the games. Rio 2016 Olympian Ismaël Coulibaly qualified for the games through the allocations of universality quota spots.

Athlete	Event	Qualification	Round of 16	Quarterfinals	Semifinals	Repechage	Final / BM	
Athlete	Event	Opposition Result	Opposition Result	Opposition Result	Opposition Result	Opposition Result	Opposition Result	Rank
Ismaël Coulibaly	Men's −80 kg	Toleugali (KAZ); L 4–5, 1–1, 1–2	Did not advance					
