= Mali at the 2020 Summer Olympics =

- IOC code: MLI
- NOC: Comité National Olympique et Sportif du Mali

in Tokyo, Japan July 23, 2021 – August 8, 2021
- Competitors: 4 in 3 sports
- Flag bearer (opening): Seydou Fofana
- Flag bearer (closing): N/A
- Medals: Gold 0 Silver 0 Bronze 0 Total 0

Summer Olympics appearances (overview)
- 1964; 1968; 1972; 1976; 1980; 1984; 1988; 1992; 1996; 2000; 2004; 2008; 2012; 2016; 2020; 2024; 2028

Mali competed at the 2020 Summer Olympics in Tokyo. Originally scheduled to take place from 24 July to 9 August 2020, the Games were postponed to 23 July to 8 August 2021, because of the COVID-19 pandemic. Since the nation made its debut in 1964, Malian athletes have appeared in every edition of the Summer Olympic Games, with the exception of the 1976 Summer Olympics in Montreal because of the African boycott.

== Competitors ==
The following is the list of number of competitors in the Games.

Sport	Men	Women	Total
Athletics	1	1	2
Swimming	1	0	1
Taekwondo	1	0	1
Total	3	1	4

== Athletics ==
Mali received universality slots from the World Athletics to send two track and field athletes (one male and one female) to the Olympics.

Key

- Note–Ranks given for track events are within the athlete's heat only
- Q = Qualified for the next round
- q = Qualified for the next round as a fastest loser or, in field events, by position without achieving the qualifying target
- NR = National record
- N/A = Round not applicable for the event
- Bye = Athlete not required to compete in round

Track & road events

Athlete	Event	Heat		Quarterfinal		Semifinal		Final	
Athlete	Event	Result	Rank	Result	Rank	Result	Rank	Result	Rank
Fodé Sissoko	Men's 200 m	21.00	5	—N/a		Did not advance			
Djenebou Dante	Women's 100 m	12.12 SB	4	Did not advance					

== Swimming ==
Mali received a universality invitation from FINA to send a top-ranked male swimmer in his respective individual events to the Olympics, based on the FINA Points System of June 28, 2021.

Athlete	Event	Heat		Semifinal		Final	
Athlete	Event	Time	Rank	Time	Rank	Time	Rank
Sebastien Kouma	Men's 100 m breaststroke	1:02.84	44	Did not advance			

== Taekwondo ==
Mali entered one athlete into the taekwondo competition at the Games. Seydou Fofana secured a spot in the men's lightweight category (68 kg) with a top two finish at the 2020 African Qualification Tournament in Rabat, Morocco.

Athlete	Event	Qualification	Round of 16	Quarterfinals	Semifinals	Repechage 1	Repechage 2	Final / BM	
Athlete	Event	Opposition Result	Opposition Result	Opposition Result	Opposition Result	Opposition Result	Opposition Result	Opposition Result	Rank
Seydou Fofana	Men's −68 kg	Rashitov (UZB); L 17–38 PTG	Did not advance			Lee D-h (KOR); L 9–11	Did not advance		
