= Mali at the 1980 Summer Olympics =

- IOC code: MLI
- NOC: Comité National Olympique et Sportif du Mali

in Moscow
- Competitors: 8
- Medals: Gold 0 Silver 0 Bronze 0 Total 0

Summer Olympics appearances (overview)
- 1964; 1968; 1972; 1976; 1980; 1984; 1988; 1992; 1996; 2000; 2004; 2008; 2012; 2016; 2020; 2024

Mali competed at the 1980 Summer Olympics in Moscow, USSR. The nation returned to the Olympic Games after boycotting the 1976 Summer Olympics.

== Results by event ==
=== Athletics ===
Men's Discus Throw

- Namakoro Niare

- Qualification — 57.34 m (→ did not advance, 15th place)

Women's 800 metres

- Fatalmoudou Touré

- Heat — 2:19.8 (→ did not advance)

=== Boxing ===
Men's Bantamweight (54 kg)

- Moussa Sangare
  1. First Round — Lost to Lucky Mutale (Zambia) on points (0-5)

=== Judo ===
Men's 71kg

- Paul Diop — T19
