= Rahmatou Dramé =

Malian hurdler (born 1985)

Rahamatou Dramé (born 1 April 1985) is an athlete who competed for Mali at the 2012 Summer Olympics in Women's 100m Hurdles.

Olympic Games
Preceded by Daba Modibo Keita	Flagbearer for Mali; 2012 London	Succeeded by Djénébou Danté
