= Nam Yun-bae =

South Korean taekwondo practitioner

Medal record

Representing South Korea

Men's taekwondo

World Championships
Bronze medal – third place	2007 Beijing	Heavyweight
Silver medal – second place	2009 Copenhagen	Heavyweight

Asian Championships
Gold medal – first place	2006 Bangkok	Heavyweight

Universiade
Gold medal – first place	2005 Izmir	Heavyweight

Nam Yun-Bae (Korean: 남윤배) is a South Korean taekwondo practitioner. Nam was born in Seongnam, South Korea.

In 2004, he won the gold medal in heavyweight and was named MVP at the World Youth Taekwondo Championships held in Suncheon, South Korea.

In 2005, Nam won the gold medal in heavyweight at the Summer Universiade, and claimed another gold medal at the 2006 World Cup Taekwondo in Bangkok, Thailand.

However, Nam didn't qualify for the 2008 Summer Olympics as he lost to heavyweight rival Cha Dong-Min in the Korean Olympic trials.

Nam won the silver medal at the 2009 World Taekwondo Championships held in Copenhagen, Denmark. This was a step up from the championships held in Beijing 2007, where he won bronze.
