= Dick Emberger =

American decathlete

Personal information
- Born: July 3, 1938 (age 88) New York City, United States

Sport
- Sport: Athletics
- Event: Decathlon

Dick Emberger (born July 3, 1938) is an American athlete. He competed in the men's decathlon at the 1964 Summer Olympics.
