= Valbjörn Þorláksson =

Icelandic athlete

Valbjörn Þorláksson (9 June 1934 – 3 December 2009) was an Icelandic track and field athlete who competed in the decathlon and pole vault in the 1960, 1964, and 1968 Summer Olympic Games. The football stadium Valbjarnarvöllur is named after him.

== Career ==
Þorláksson's best Olympic result was in 1964; he finished 12th in the decathlon. He finished 26th in the same event in 1968.

Þorláksson had only modest success in open competition, but enjoyed some success in master's track meets, competing at least into the early 1980s. At one time, he held the unofficial 42 inch hurdles record for men over 45 years of age with a time of 15.1.

== Died ==
Þorláksson died on 3 December 2009.
