= Kristopher Moitland =

Costa Rican taekwondo practitioner

Personal information
- Full name: Kristopher Moitland Cabezas
- Nationality: Costa Rica
- Born: 2 September 1983 (age 43)
- Height: 1.86 m (6 ft 1 in)
- Weight: 95 kg (209 lb)

Sport
- Sport: Taekwondo
- Event: +80 kg

Kristopher Moitland Cabezas (born September 2, 1983) is a two-time Olympic taekwondo practitioner, and a multiple-time Pan American Championship medalist from Costa Rica. Moitland first competed at the 2004 Summer Olympics in Athens, where he was eliminated in the heavyweight division, after being defeated by France's Pascal Gentil, who eventually won the bronze medal, during the quarterfinal match, the S Class International Olympic Referee Dr. Mohamed Riad Ibrahim was the Referee of this match. At his second Olympics in Beijing, Moitland improved his tactics and strategies to kick and fight against every opponent in the men's heavyweight category (+80 kg). In the first round, he fought against Korea's Cha Dong-Min, who made his debut at the Olympics. Neither them received any points in the first period, until Moitland received two warnings by the judges, and was eliminated from the competition. Because his opponent advanced further into the final round, Moitland automatically qualified for the repechage bout, where he lost to Uzbekistan's Akmal Irgashev by a single point.
