= Brahima Guindo =

Malian judoka (born 1977)

Medal record

Men's judo

All-Africa Games
Bronze medal – third place	1999 Johannesburg	81 kg

Brahima Guindo (born 9 September 1977) is a Malian judoka who won a bronze medal at the 1999 Pan-African Games, and a bronze medal at the 2000 African Judo Championships.

== Achievements ==
Year	Tournament	Place	Weight class
2000	African Judo Championships	3rd	Half middleweight (81 kg)
1999	All-Africa Games	3rd	Half middleweight (81 kg)

Olympic Games
Preceded by Monique Ross	Flagbearer for Mali; 2000 Sydney	Succeeded by Kadiatou Camara
