= Moon Dae-sung =

South Korean taekwondo athlete

Moon Dae-Sung
Personal information
- Nationality: South Korean
- Born: September 3, 1976 (age 50)
- Height: 191 cm (6 ft 3 in)
- Weight: 200 lb (91 kg)
Medal record
Men's taekwondo
Representing South Korea
Olympic Games
Gold medal – first place	2004 Athens	+80 kg
World Championships
Gold medal – first place	1999 Edmonton	Heavyweight
Asian Games
Gold medal – first place	2002 Busan	Heavyweight
Asian Championships
Gold medal – first place	2000 Hong Kong	Heavyweight

- Moon Dae-sung
- Hangul: 문대성
- Hanja: 文大成
- RR: Mun Daeseong
- MR: Mun Taesŏng

Moon Dae-sung (Korean: 문대성; born September 3, 1976) is a retired 6 ft 3 in (1.91 m) 200 lb (91 kg) Olympic taekwondo athlete from South Korea. He won a gold medal at the 2004 Olympics held in Athens, Greece, in the heavyweight division after knocking out Greece's Alexandros Nikolaidis with a reverse kick.

== Career ==
He entered Dong-A University on a taekwondo scholarship in 1995 and performed consistently well in national competitions during his college years, though usually overshadowed by the dominant heavyweight champion Kim Je-Gyoung.

Upon graduation from Dong-A University in Busan, South Korea in 1999, Moon became a member of the Samsung Corporation Professional Taekwondo team. Many considered Moon to be the next Kim Je-Gyoung, two time Olympic Gold Medalist and also a member of the Samsung Professional Team and graduate of Dong-A University, in the heavyweight division of the Korean National team.

Since his high profile win at the Athens Olympic Games, Moon has become a well known celebrity in South Korea, owing to his performance in the Gold Medal round. He has become the official Audi Automobile Company's spokesman and has made numerous television and public appearances.

Moon is noted for his technical prowess, particularly his strong back kicks with his left foot, as well as a solid grasp of other core techniques indispensable to fighting in high level international and Korean domestic competitions.

== Post career ==
=== As IOC member ===
In August 2008 he was elected as a member of the International Olympic Committee by the 120th IOC Session.

=== As a politician ===
Moon ran for being a lawmaker in the first (gap) legislative district of Saha District under the Saenuri Party banner in 2012; he won the election.

== Plagiarism scandal ==
His doctoral thesis for Kookmin University, "Effect of Proprioceptive Neuromuscular Facilitation (PNF) on Flexibility and Isokinetic Muscle Strength in Taekwondo Player", came to the attention of the public media in South Korea as a "copy-and-paste" plagiarism. There are a number of "copy-and-paste" paragraphs in introduction, literature review, and discussion section of the thesis.

The scandal later affected his rookie political career, but he decided to stay in the ruling party and maintained his innocence.

In April 2012, the research ethics committee of the Kookmin University announced: "The research subject of the doctoral thesis by Moon Dae-sung and part of the purpose of the research of his thesis overlap with those of a doctoral thesis by a person surnamed Kim at Myongji University. Not only that but a significant portion of the writing in the introduction, the theoretical background and the arguments in the two theses are so identical that we concluded this goes beyond what is normally permitted by the academic community."

Minutes after the school's announcement, Moon issued a statement to announce his departure from the ruling party.

In March 2014, Kookmin University officially canceled his PhD. Moon launched a nullification lawsuit, which his opponents believe is a tactic to keep his seat in the IOC as well as the ruling Saenuri Party.
