= Juan Díaz (taekwondo) =

Venezuelan taekwondo practitioner (b. 1981)

Personal information
- Full name: Juan Carlos Díaz Falcon
- Nationality: Venezuela
- Born: 2 June 1981 (age 45)
- Height: 1.80 m (5 ft 11 in)
- Weight: 84 kg (185 lb)

Sport
- Sport: Taekwondo
- Event: +80 kg
Medal record
Men's taekwondo
Representing Venezuela
Pan American Games
Silver medal – second place	2011 Guadalajara	+80 kg

Juan Carlos Díaz Falcon (born June 2, 1981) is a Venezuelan taekwondo practitioner. He won a silver medal for the heavyweight class at the 2011 Pan American Games in Guadalajara, Mexico, losing out to Cuba's Robelis Despaigne.

== Career ==
Diaz qualified for the men's heavyweight division (+80 kg) at the 2008 Summer Olympics in Beijing, after placing third in the Pan American Qualification Tournament in Cali, Colombia. He was knocked out by Morocco's Abdelkader Zrouri, at one minute and forty seconds in the second round of preliminary match, with a final score of 3–4.
