= Mohamed Riad Ibrahim =

Taekwando referee from Egypt

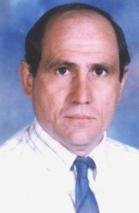
- Born: October 26, 1955 (age 70); Cairo, Egypt
- Occupation: Taekwondo referee

Dr. Mohamed Riad Ibrahim (born October 26, 1955, in Cairo, Egypt) is a taekwondo international referee who participated in the 2004 Summer Olympics in Athens, Greece and the 2000 Summer Olympics in Sydney, Australia.

== Biography ==
Ibrahim started in taekwondo in 1975 at The American University in Cairo (AUC) with a Korean coach. He became a referee in taekwondo in 1980 and international referee in 1989, and international poomsae referee in 2008. He is now an 8 dan black belt in taekwondo, and the Chairman of the belt exam committee for the Egyptian Taekwondo Federation. He has a doctorate degree in food science and technology from Al-Azhar University in the year 2000 in Egypt, and High Diploma in Taekwondo Training from Helwan University in 2008, and he was manager of Saudi Judo & Taekwondo Federation in 2009. He officiated as International Referee at the 1999 World Taekwondo Championships in Edmonton, Canada, and at the 2011 World Taekwondo Championships in Gyeongju, South Korea. He officiated as International Referee at World Qualification Tournament for the 2012 London Olympic Games that was held in Baku, Azerbaijan 2011, and Asian Qualification Tournament that was held in Bangkok, Thailand 2011, and European Qualification Tournament that was held in Kazan, Russia 2012.
