= Pascal Gentil =

French taekwondo practitioner

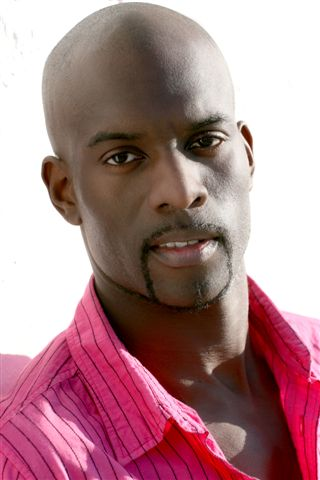

Personal information
- Born: 15 May 1973 (age 53) Paris, France
Medal record
Men's taekwondo
Representing France
Olympic Games
Bronze medal – third place	2000 Sydney	Heavyweight (+80 kg)
Bronze medal – third place	2004 Athens	Heavyweight (+80 kg)
World Championships
Silver medal – second place	1995 Manila	Heavyweight (+83 kg)
European Championships
Gold medal – first place	1994 Zagreb	+83 kg
Gold medal – first place	1998 Eindhoven	+84 kg
Gold medal – first place	2005 Riga	+84 kg
Silver medal – second place	1996 Helsinki	+83 kg
Silver medal – second place	2004 Lillehammer	+84 kg
Silver medal – second place	2008 Rome	+84 kg

Pascal Gentil (born 15 May 1973 in Paris) is a French taekwondo practitioner. A three-time winner of the European Championships, four-time World Cup Champion and Olympic bronze medallist at the 2000 Summer Olympics in Sydney and at the 2004 Summer Olympics in Athens, Pascal Gentil is the most decorated taekwondo practitioner in French taekwondo history. The S Class International Olympic Referee Dr. Mohamed Riad Ibrahim was the Referee in the Final Match of Pascal Gentil in the 2004 Summer Olympic in Athens, and in this Match Pascal Gentil Won the bronze medal.

Captain of the French taekwondo team, Pascal Gentil won his third European title in October 2005 in Riga giving the French team a second position among the European countries behind Turkey with 6 medals including 3 titles. The ranking is the same as for the Athens Games with 2 medals (1 silver, 1 bronze) as France finished as 2nd best European country behind Greece (host country).

To prepare for the Olympics, the French Taekwondo Federation set up training centres by grouping together in different locations the best French athletes according to weight categories. Pascal Gentil is a member of Institut National des Sports et de l'Éducation Physique France Training Centre where he trains an average of 20 hours per week together with the best French taekwondo practitioners.

He was selected for the Beijing Games to snatch the gold medal. His opponent for the selection was Mickaël Borot who obtained the French quota in the category by winning the Olympic qualification tournament in Manchester in 2007.

However, during a training session on the 25 July 2008, Pascal sustained an injury (a rupture of the plantar aponeurosis). Mickaël Borot was officially appointed the representative on 6 August by the FFTDA （French Taekwondo Federation. The event lead to a crisis week for French taekwondo as Mickaël Borot criticised the French Taekwondo Federation and Pascal Gentil.

On 5 February 2009 he announced to the press that he would give up his sport career in taekwondo after the French Championships in Lyon on 7 February. In Lyon, he obtained his 14th French Champion title after defeating Mickaël Borot in the final.
