= Fatoumata Samassékou =

Malian swimmer (born 1987)

Personal information
- Born: December 31, 1987 (age 38) Abidjan, Mali

Sport
- Sport: Swimming

Fatoumata Samassékou (born 31 December 1987) is an international swimmer who competed for Mali at the 2012 and 2016 Summer Olympics.

== Athletic career ==
In 2012, she competed in the women's 50 m freestyle and finished in 62nd place with a time of 31.88 seconds. In 2016, she competed in the same event and tied for 81st place with a time of 33.71 seconds.

== Personal life ==
Samassékou lived in ïssata Labita and protested lack of compensation for demolitions in the area to make way for airport construction.
