= Stephen Lambdin =

American taekwondo practitioner

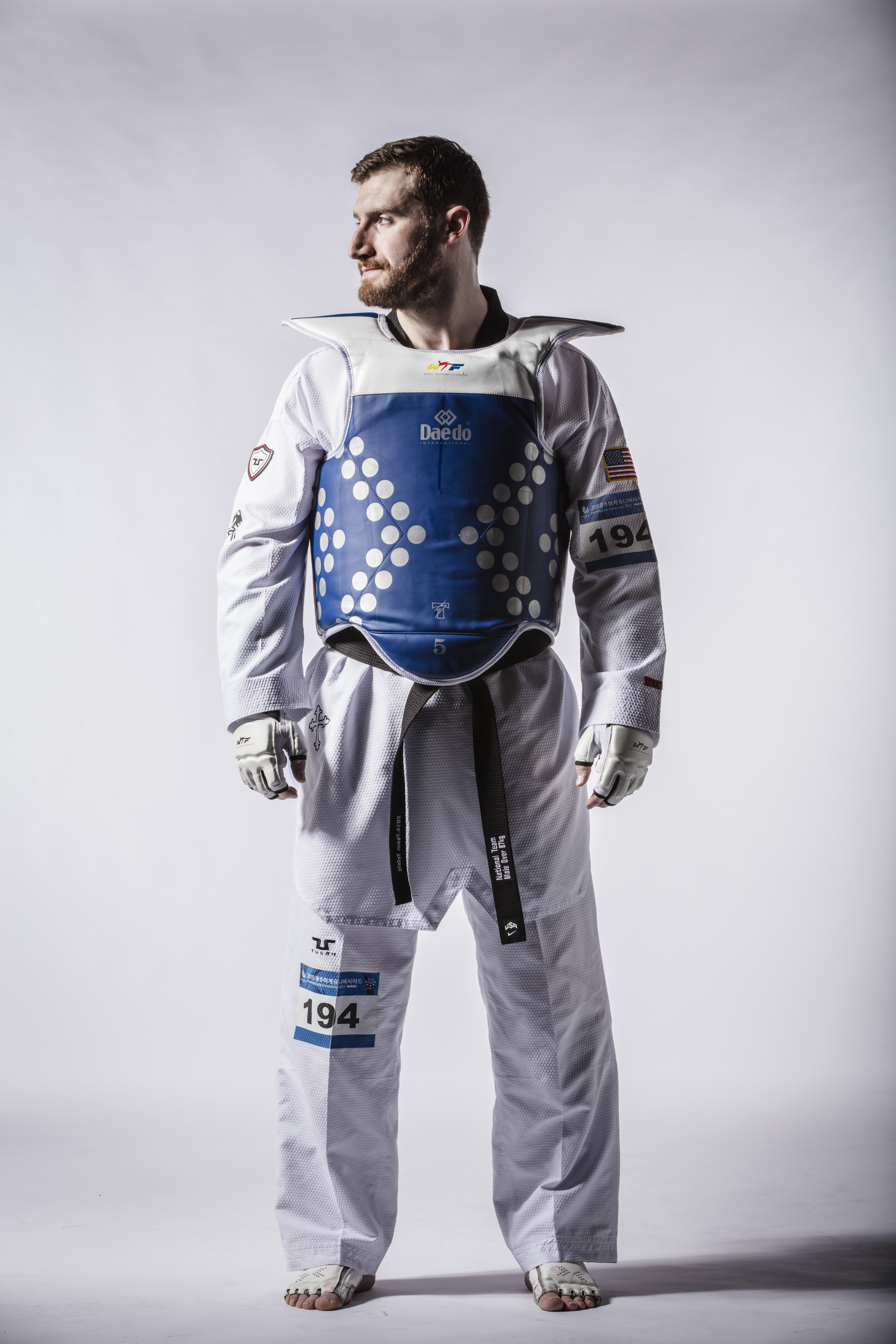

Personal information
- Born: March 9, 1988 (age 38) Texas, United States
Medal record
Men's taekwondo
Representing the United States
Pan American Games
Bronze medal – third place	2011 Guadalajara	+80 kg
World University Championships
Bronze medal – third place	2012 Pocheon	+87kg
Bronze medal – third place	2008 Belgrade	+84kg
Pan American Taekwondo Championships
Bronze medal – third place	2012 Sucré	+87kg
Silver medal – second place	2006 Buenos Aires	+84kg
World Junior Championships
Bronze medal – third place	2004 Sucheon	+78kg
WTF A-Class International Opens
Silver medal – second place	2013 Buenos Aires	+87kg
Gold medal – first place	2013 Toronto	+84kg
Gold medal – first place	2012 Belgrade	+87kg
Gold medal – first place	2010 Manchester	+84kg
Gold medal – first place	2010 Alicante	+84kg

Stephen Lambdin (born Stephen Thomas Lambdin, March 9, 1988) is an American taekwondo competitor. He represented Team USA at the 2016 Olympic Games in Rio, Brazil. He represented the United States at the 2011 Pan American Games, where he won a bronze medal. He trains with coach Jeff Pinaroc in Mansfield Texas. He is a graduate of Colleyville Heritage High School and California Lutheran University.

Lambdin competes in the heavyweight division (+190 lbs/+87 kg). As of May 1, 2013, Lambdin was ranked 10th in the WTF World Taekwondo rankings. As of March 18, 2019, Lambdin was ranked 13th in the Olympic Kyorugi Ranking (Senior Division / M+80 kg) and 10th in the World Kyorugi Ranking (Senior Division / M+87 kg).
