= Vedran Golec =

Croatian taekwondo practitioner

Vedran Golec (born 30 June 1989 in Bjelovar, Croatia) is a Croatian taekwondo fighter. He won silver in the men's +87 kg division at the 2014 European Taekwondo Championships and bronze in the men's +80 kg division at the 2015 European Games. He is the most successful Croatian Taekwondo Fighter in category over 80 kg (11 times Croatian Champion).
