= Mariam Pauline Keita =

Malian swimmer (born 1983)

Personal information
- Full name: Mariam Pauline Keita
- National team: Mali
- Born: 2 September 1983 (age 42) Bamako, Mali
- Height: 1.60 m (5 ft 3 in)
- Weight: 50 kg (110 lb)

Sport
- Sport: Swimming
- Strokes: Breaststroke

Mariam Pauline Keita (born September 2, 1983, in Bamako) is a three-time Olympic swimmer from Mali, specialized in breaststroke events. She made her first Malian team at the 2000 Summer Olympics in Sydney, and competed for the women's 100 m breaststroke. At age seventeen, Keita won the first heat of the event, where two of her swimmers were disqualified for a false start and for violating the technical rules of the sport, recording the slowest possible time in the prelims at 1:37.80. On her second Olympic appearance in Athens 2004, Keita swam swiftly and improved her personal best in the 100 m breaststroke event. She finished the same heat in sixth place and forty-sixth overall, with a time of 1:30.40, just seven seconds ahead of her mark from the previous Games.

For her third and final Olympics in Beijing, Keita swam in the women's breaststroke events, with fair results. She finished last in the first heat of the women's 100 m breaststroke event, against Asmahan Farhat of Libya, and Anna Salnikova of Georgia, with a time of 1:24.26. Although she had achieved her personal best, Keita, however, failed to advance into the semi-final rounds, as she placed forty-sixth in the overall rankings.
