= Daba Modibo Keïta =

Malian taekwondo practitioner

Medal record

Men's taekwondo

Representing Mali

World Championships
Gold medal – first place	2007 Beijing	Heavyweight
Gold medal – first place	2009 Copenhagen	Heavyweight

West African Championship
Gold medal – first place	1996 Abidjan	Heavyweight
Gold medal – first place	1996 Bamako	Heavyweight
Bronze medal – third place	1998 Accra	Heavyweight

African Championship
Gold medal – first place	2005 Madagascar	Heavyweight

Daba Modibo Keïta (born 5 April 1981) is a Malian taekwondo athlete. Keïta has competed in international competitions since 1996, and in 2007 became the heavyweight (+84 kg) division 2007 World Taekwondo Champion in Beijing, and competed in both the 2008 and 2012 Summer Olympics in the +80 kg class.

== Personal life ==
Keïta was born in Abidjan (Côte d'Ivoire) to Malian parents, and was named for the first President of Mali, Modibo Keita. He was forced to flee the country with his family in 2000 during the wave of xenophobia which preceded the Ivorian Civil War. Settling in Mali, Keïta had little funding for training, but received an IOC Olympic Solidarity Scholarship to pay for his training with Ivorian fighter Patrice Remarck in the United States. With coach Jorge F. Ramos, finances forced Keïta to stay with friends in Beijing during the 2007 world championship and train in a hotel courtyard. Keïta is managed by his older brother, Badra, and has lived and trained in France and the United States. Two of his brothers and two of his five sisters practice taekwondo, with his sisters both blue belts.

== 2007 world champion ==
Despite tearing a back muscle before the match, Keïta won the gold medal for the Heavyweight (84 kg) division 2007 World Taekwondo Champion in Beijing by beating Iranian Morteza Rostami 3 to −1 in the final. He is the first Sub-Saharan African to hold the title of Taekwondo World Champion, and has become a national hero in Mali. Keita himself has reflected that "Winning the world title was almost unthinkable for an African, or someone from a developing nation".

Keïta has become a national figure, making public appearances and meeting several times with the President Amadou Toumani Touré, who personally saw Keïta off to the Olympics. In part through Keïta's success, Taekwondo has exploded in popularity in the nation. In 2008 the Mali boasted over 150 clubs federated to the Fédération malienne de taekwondo (FEMAT) and 500 black belts among the almost 15,000 Malians who practise the sport.

== 2008 Olympic games ==
He represented Mali at the 2008 Summer Olympics in Beijing, and was favoured before the games to win the first Olympic gold medal for Mali in history. He was quoted in August saying "For any athlete the Olympic Games are a dream... ...Africa really needs this medal."

Keïta was flag bearer for his nation at the opening ceremony, and competed in the 80 + kg Olympic division, beginning 23 August 2008. In the first round, Keïta defeated Mickael Justin Borot 6–5 to advance to the quarterfinals but was knocked out by eventual bronze medalist Nigerian Chika Yagazie Chukwumerije 3–2 in extra time.

Much expectation had been placed on the world champion in Mali, which had never won any Olympic medal. After Keïta's loss, the president of Mali, Amadou Toumani Touré, was quoted in the state run paper l'Essor, saying that this was "A painful day for Mali". The paper announced the loss as "an immense disappointment for the nation."

== 2012 Olympic games ==
Keïta made it to the bronze medal match. He was forced to withdraw due to injury from the scheduled match with Cuba's Robelis Despaigne allowing Despaigne to win the bronze medal due to walkover.

== Achievements ==
- 1996 : Gold Medal at the West African Championship in Abidjan
- 1997 : Gold Medal at the West African Championship in Bamako
- 1999 : Bronze Medal at the West African Championship in Accra
- 2002, 2004 : champion of Mali
- 2004 : Gold Medal at the Paris Open Championship, in the Open international Open Championship of Nantes and in the Open Championship of Picardie
- 2005 : Gold Medal at the Paris Open Championship
- 2005 : Sportsmanship trophy in the 17th World Taekwondo Championships in Madrid
- 2005 : Gold Medal at the African Championship Madagascar
- 2005 : Gold Medal at the Coupe du monde francophone in Niamey (Niger).
- 2007 : Gold Medal at the 18th World Taekwondo Championships in Beijing (84 kg) as well as the trophy for MVP (Samsung Blue Passion Award).
- 2009 : Gold Medal at the 19th World Taekwondo Championships in Copenhagen. (84 kg)

== See also ==
- Mali at the 2008 Summer Olympics

Olympic Games
Preceded by Kadiatou Camara	Flagbearer for Mali; Beijing 2008	Succeeded by Rahmatou Dramé
