= Akmal Irgashev =

Uzbekistani taekwondo practitioner

Personal information
- Born: 16 December 1982 (age 43)

Sport
- Country: Uzbekistan
- Sport: Men's taekwondo
Medal record
Representing Uzbekistan
Asian Games
Bronze medal – third place	2010 Guangzhou	Heavyweight

Akmal Irgashev (born 16 December 1982) is a taekwondo athlete from Uzbekistan. He finished in 5th place at the 2008 Summer Olympics, losing in the quarter-finals to the eventual champion Cha Dong-min, and then to Chika Chukwumerije in the repechage. He also competed at the London Olympics 2012. He was the bronze medalist in Taekwondo at the 2010 Asian Games.
