= Zakaria Asidah =

Danish taekwondo practitioner

Medal record

Representing Denmark

Men's taekwondo

World Championships
| Silver medal – second place | 2003 Garmisch | Heavyweight |

European Championships
| Silver medal – second place | 2010 Saint Petersburg | Heavyweight |

Zakaria Asidah (born 22 June 1972) is a Danish Taekwondo athlete. Asidah won the silver medal in heavyweight (over 84 kg) at the 2003 World Taekwondo Championships in Garmisch-Partenkirchen, Germany. He is also a three-time World Cup heavyweight medalist (1 silver, 2 bronze), and participated in the 2004 Athens Olympics.

He currently trains at Hwarang Taekwondo Klub in Rødovre and Tan Gun Sae Sim Københavns Taekwondo Klub
