= Alexandros Nikolaidis =

Greek taekwondo practitioner (1979–2022)

Medal record

Men's taekwondo

Representing Greece

Olympic Games
| Silver medal – second place | 2004 Athens | +80 kg |
| Silver medal – second place | 2008 Beijing | +80 kg |

World Championships
| Gold medal – first place | 1996 Barcelona | Welterweight |

European Championships
| Gold medal – first place | 1996 Zagreb | Welterweight |
| Gold medal – first place | 1997 Patra | Welterweight |
| Gold medal – first place | 2008 Rome | Heavyweight |
| Bronze medal – third place | 2010 Saint Petersburg | Heavyweight |

Mediterranean Games
| Silver medal – second place | 2013 Mersin | Heavyweight |

Alexandros Nikolaidis (Greek: Αλέξανδρος Νικολαϊδης, 17 October 1979 – 14 October 2022) was a Greek taekwondo athlete. He was named the 2008 Greek Male Athlete of the Year. Initially the home favorite, he won the silver medal at the 2004 Olympics held in Athens after losing to Moon Dae-Sung of South Korea in the gold medal match.

On 24 March 2008, Alexandros Nikolaidis had the honour to be the first torch-bearer of the 2008 Summer Olympics torch relay.

Later in the same year on 11 April, he won the European Championship in Rome.

At the 2008 Beijing Olympics, Nikolaidis won another Olympic silver medal in the +80 kg category, after losing to Cha Dong-Min of South Korea in the final.

In July 2011, he managed to secure a place at the 2012 Olympic Games by placing third in the 2011 World Taekwondo Olympic Qualification Tournament in Baku, Azerbaijan by defeating Liu Xiaobo of China in the 3rd place play-off. He carried the flag for Greece during the Parade of Nations at the 2012 Summer Olympics in London.

On 11 August 2012, Nikolaidis began and ended his Olympics participation in a "preliminary round" bout against Bahri Tanrikulu. Nikolaidis lost 7–3 overall.

Nikolaidis retired in 2014. He died on 14 October 2022, at the age of 42. Nikolaidis had been suffering from an "extremely rare" form of cancer for two years prior to his death.

== Personal ==
His family hails from Mavrovouni Pella. Nikolaidis was married to Ruxi Dumitrescu and they had one son. In 2016 he was married to the journalist Dora Tsampazi, and they had two children. Ιn his honor, the municipal stadium of Polichni (Thessaloniki), where he was from, was named after him.

Olympic Games
| Preceded by Ilias Iliadis | Flagbearer for Greece; London 2012 | Succeeded by Sofia Bekatorou |
