= Cha Dong-min =

South Korean taekwondoin (born 1986)

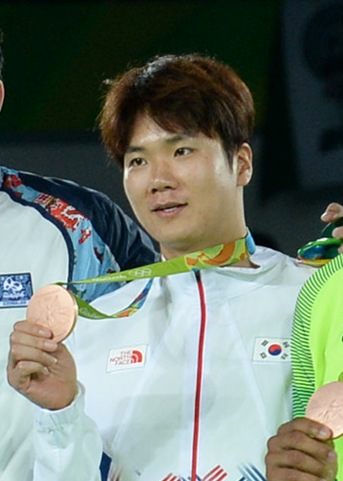

Personal information
- Nationality: South Korean
- Born: August 24, 1986 (age 39)
- Education: Korea National Sport University
- Height: 188 cm (6 ft 2 in)
- Weight: 90 kg (198 lb)
- Website: kajunight
Medal record
Representing South Korea
Men's taekwondo
Olympic Games
Gold medal – first place	2008 Beijing	+80 kg
Bronze medal – third place	2016 Rio De Janeiro	+80 kg
World Championships
Silver medal – second place	2011 Gyeongju	Middleweight
Asian Championships
Gold medal – first place	2012 Ho Chi Minh City	Heavyweight
East Asian Games
Gold medal – first place	2009 Hong Kong	Heavyweight

Korean name
- Hangul: 차동민
- Hanja: 車東旻
- RR: Cha Dongmin
- MR: Ch'a Tongmin

Cha Dong-min (Korean: 차동민; Korean pronunciation: [tɕʰa.doŋ.min]; born August 24, 1986) is a retired South Korean taekwondo practitioner.

== Sports career ==
He was born in Seoul, South Korea.

In 2008, he won the gold medal in the +80 kg category at the Beijing Olympic Games.

He participated in the 2012 London Olympic Games to defend his title as the Number 1 seed in the 80 kg division, but was eliminated in the Quarterfinal round against Bahri Tanrıkulu of Turkey.

He competed for the 2016 Rio Olympics in the same division where he won a bronze medal. This was his last International competition, as he announced his retirement.
