= Liu Xiaobo (taekwondo) =

Chinese taekwondo athlete

Personal information
- Nationality: Chinese
- Born: 16 January 1984 (age 42) Beijing, China

Sport
- Sport: Taekwondo
Medal record
Men's taekwondo
Representing China
Olympic Games
Bronze medal – third place	2012 London	+80 kg
Asian Games
Bronze medal – third place	2006 Doha	Heavyweight
Asian Taekwondo Championships
Gold medal – first place	2008 Luoyang	Heavyweight
Silver medal – second place	2012 Ho Chi Minh City	Heavyweight

Liu Xiaobo (simplified Chinese: 刘哮波; traditional Chinese: 劉哮波; pinyin: Liú Xiàobō; born 16 January 1984 in Beijing) is a Chinese taekwondo athlete. He competed at the 2008 and 2012 Summer Olympics, and won a bronze medal at the latter. Liu also won medals at the 2006 Asian Games and the 2008 and 2012 Asian Taekwondo Championships.

== See also ==
- China at the 2012 Summer Olympics § Taekwondo
- Taekwondo at the 2012 Summer Olympics – Men's +80 kg
