= Abdelkader Zrouri =

Moroccan taekwondo practitioner

Medal record

Representing Morocco

Men's taekwondo

World Championships
| Silver medal – second place | 2005 Madrid | Heavyweight |
| Bronze medal – third place | 2007 Beijing | Heavyweight |

Abdelkader Zrouri (born September 20, 1976) is a Moroccan Taekwondo athlete.

Zrouri competed in the men's +80 kg class at the 2008 Summer Olympics held in Beijing, China. In the preliminary round, he landed an axe kick (naeryeo chagi) on Juan Diaz of Venezuela and knocked Diaz out at 1:40 of the second round. However, Zrouri was eliminated in the quarterfinals by losing to eventual silver medalist Alexandros Nikolaidis of Greece 5–4.
