= Mickaël Borot =

French taekwondo practitioner

Medal record

Representing France

Men's taekwondo

World Championships
Silver medal – second place	2001 Jeju	Middleweight
Silver medal – second place	2003 Garmisch	Middleweight

European Championships
Gold medal – first place	2006 Bonn	Heavyweight
Bronze medal – third place	2010 Saint Petersburg	Heavyweight

Mickaël Justin Borot (born 31 May 1975) is a French Taekwondo athlete.
