= National Olympic and Sports Committee of Mali =

National Olympic Committee

- Country: Mali
- [[|]]
- Code: MLI
- Recognized: 1963
- Continental Association: ANOCA
- Headquarters: Bamako, Mali
- President: Habib Sissoko
- Secretary General: Mohamed Oumar Traore
- Website: cnosm.org

The National Olympic and Sports Committee of Mali (French: Comité National Olympique et Sportif du Mali) (IOC code: MLI) is the National Olympic Committee representing Mali.

== See also ==
- Mali at the Olympics
