= List of flag bearers for Gabon at the Olympics =

Gabon at the Olympics
- IOC code: GAB
- NOC: Comité Olympique Gabonais
- Medals: Gold 0 Silver 1 Bronze 0 Total 1

Summer appearances
- 1972; 1976–1980; 1984; 1988; 1992; 1996; 2000; 2004; 2008; 2012; 2016; 2020; 2024

This is a list of flag bearers who have represented Gabon at the Olympics.

Flag bearers carry the national flag of their country at the opening ceremony of the Olympic Games.

#	Event year	Season	Flag bearer	Sport
1	1972	Summer	Matias Moussobou	Boxing
2	1984	Summer	Odette Mistoul	Athletics
3	1988	Summer	Gisèle Ongollo	Athletics
4	1992	Summer		
5	1996	Summer	Roger Oyembo	Official
6	2000	Summer	Mélanie Engoang	Judo
7	2004	Summer	Mélanie Engoang	Judo
8	2008	Summer	Mélanie Engoang	Judo
9	2012	Summer	Ruddy Zang Milama	Athletics
10	2016	Summer	Anthony Obame	Taekwondo
11	2020	Summer	Aya Girard de Langlade Mpali	Swimming
11	2020	Summer	Anthony Obame	Taekwondo
12	2024	Summer	Wissy Frank Hoye Yenda Moukoula	Athletics
12	2024	Summer	Noelie Annette Lacour	Swimming

== See also ==
- Gabon at the Olympics
