= Gabon at the 2025 World Aquatics Championships =

- Flag of Gabon
- World Aquatics code: GAB
- National federation: Fédération Gabonaise de Natation

in Singapore
- Competitors: 1 in 1 sport
- Medals: Gold 0 Silver 0 Bronze 0 Total 0

World Aquatics Championships appearances
- 2015; 2017; 2019; 2022; 2023; 2024; 2025

Gabon is competing at the 2025 World Aquatics Championships in Singapore from 11 July to 3 August 2025.

== Competitors ==
The following is the list of competitors in the Championships.

Sport	Men	Women	Total
Swimming	0	1	1
Total	0	1	1

== Swimming ==
Women

Athlete	Event	Heat		Semifinal		Final	
Athlete	Event	Time	Rank	Time	Rank	Time	Rank
Noelie Annette Lacour	50 m freestyle	27.56	57	Did not advance			
Noelie Annette Lacour	50 m butterfly	28.98	56	Did not advance			
