= 2013 World Taekwondo Championships – Men's heavyweight =

Taekwondo competition

Men's heavyweight at the 2013 World Championships
- Venue: Exhibition Center of Puebla
- Dates: 19 July 2013
- Competitors: 45 from 44 nations

Medalists
gold medal	Anthony Obame	Gabon
silver medal	Sajjad Mardani	Iran
bronze medal	Ivan Trajkovič	Slovenia
bronze medal	Robelis Despaigne	Cuba

The men's heavyweight is a competition featured at the 2013 World Taekwondo Championships, and was held at the Exhibition Center of Puebla in Puebla, Mexico on July 19. Heavyweights were limited to a minimum of 87 kilograms in body mass.

== Results ==
- DQ — Won by disqualification
- K — Won by knockout
- P — Won by punitive declaration
- W — Won by withdrawal

=== Finals ===
Semifinals		Final
Anthony Obame (GAB)	W
Ivan Trajkovič (SLO)		Anthony Obame (GAB)	10
Sajjad Mardani (IRI)	5	Sajjad Mardani (IRI)	2
Robelis Despaigne (CUB)	4

=== Top half ===
==== Section 1 ====
Round of 64
Teemu Heino (FIN)	5
Relja Prosenica (SRB)	0
Lu Hsueh-ju (TPE)	0
Serdar Yüksel (TUR)	1
Juan Díaz (VEN)	7
Sergey Pak (KAZ)	2

Round of 32
Anthony Obame (GAB)	1
Teemu Heino (FIN)	0
Christos Zeimpekis (GRE)	1
Abel Valdivia (USA)	6
Chika Chukwumerije (NGR)	3
Serdar Yüksel (TUR)	1
Juan Díaz (VEN)	10
Firmin Zokou (CIV)	13

Round of 16
Anthony Obame (GAB)	6
Abel Valdivia (USA)	2
Chika Chukwumerije (NGR)	4
Firmin Zokou (CIV)	5

Quarterfinals
Anthony Obame (GAB)	10
Firmin Zokou (CIV)	9

==== Section 2 ====
Round of 64
Jeyhun Hasanli (AZE)	11
Bader Al-Enezi (KUW)	4
Carlos Cañas (COL)	11
Edson Breedy (TTO)	3
Yimamu Wubuli (CHN)	3
Martín Sio (ARG)	2
Jayson Grant (JAM)	1
Piotr Hatowski (POL)	2

Round of 32
Ivan Trajkovič (SLO)	11
Jeyhun Hasanli (AZE)	9
Carlos Cañas (COL)	5
Ocelotzin Sánchez (MEX)	6
Demetris Moustakas (CYP)	7
Yimamu Wubuli (CHN)	4
Piotr Hatowski (POL)	3
Kristopher Moitland (CRC)	3

Round of 16
Ivan Trajkovič (SLO)	7
Ocelotzin Sánchez (MEX)	5
Demetris Moustakas (CYP)	1
Piotr Hatowski (POL)	3^{K}

Quarterfinals
Ivan Trajkovič (SLO)	10
Piotr Hatowski (POL)	5

=== Bottom half ===
==== Section 3 ====
Round of 64
Mohammad Ayman (JOR)	2
Abdoul Razak Issoufou (NIG)	10^{P}
~~Oleksandr Cherkun (UKR)~~
Dmitriy Shokin (UZB)	DQ
Zakaria Asidah (DEN)	9
Kwak Do-hoon (KOR)	6

Round of 32
Leonardo Basile (ITA)	5^{W}
Abdoul Razak Issoufou (NIG)	1
Haamanatua Mu (FPO)	6
Felipe Vignoli (BRA)	3
Sajjad Mardani (IRI)	7
Dmitriy Shokin (UZB)	6
Zakaria Asidah (DEN)
François Coulombe-Fortier (CAN)	W

Round of 16
Leonardo Basile (ITA)	10
Haamanatua Mu (FPO)	0
Sajjad Mardani (IRI)	4
François Coulombe-Fortier (CAN)	3

Quarterfinals
Leonardo Basile (ITA)	2
Sajjad Mardani (IRI)	14

==== Section 4 ====
Round of 64
~~Akshay Kumar (WTF)~~
Alisher Gulov (TJK)	DQ
Mohamed El-Kharzazi (MAR)	DQ
~~Pita Taufatofua (TGA)~~
Christoph Decker (AUT)	0
Arman-Marshall Silla (BLR)	8

Round of 32
Mohamed Ayman (EGY)	2
Alisher Gulov (TJK)	1
Mohamed El-Kharzazi (MAR)	0
Roman Kuznetsov (RUS)	9
Volker Wodzich (GER)	2
Adrián Cabo (ESP)	0
Arman-Marshall Silla (BLR)	8
Robelis Despaigne (CUB)	10

Round of 16
Mohamed Ayman (EGY)	1
Roman Kuznetsov (RUS)	9
Volker Wodzich (GER)	4
Robelis Despaigne (CUB)	4

Quarterfinals
Roman Kuznetsov (RUS)	6
Robelis Despaigne (CUB)	16
