= 2015 World Taekwondo Championships – Men's heavyweight =

Taekwondo competition

Men's heavyweight at the 2015 World Championships
- Venue: Traktor Ice Arena
- Dates: 16–17 May 2015
- Competitors: 53 from 53 nations

Medalists
| gold medal | Dmitriy Shokin | Uzbekistan |
| silver medal | Firmin Zokou | Ivory Coast |
| bronze medal | Anthony Obame | Gabon |
| bronze medal | Robelis Despaigne | Cuba |

The men's heavyweight is a competition featured at the 2015 World Taekwondo Championships, and was held at the Traktor Ice Arena in Chelyabinsk, Russia on May 16 and May 17. Heavyweights were limited to a minimum of 87 kilograms in body mass.

== Results ==
Legend

- DQ — Won by disqualification
- P — Won by punitive declaration
- R — Won by referee stop contest
- W — Won by withdrawal

=== Finals ===
| Semifinals | | Final |
| Anthony Obame (GAB) | 5 |
| Firmin Zokou (CIV) | 8 | Firmin Zokou (CIV) | 10 |
| Robelis Despaigne (CUB) | 6 | Dmitriy Shokin (UZB) | 11 |
| Dmitriy Shokin (UZB) | 7 |

=== Top half ===
==== Section 1 ====
Round of 64
Mykhailo Shelest (UKR) | 6
David Gevondyan (ARM) | 3
Omar El-Yazidi (FRA) | 5
Kristopher Uy (PHI) | 1
David Adjetey (GHA) | 8
Tuarai Hery (FPO) | 16
Braian Elliot (URU) | 4
Jesús Perea (ECU) | 13
Yang Yi (CHN) | 8
Adrián Cabo (ESP) | 5

Round of 32
Anthony Obame (GAB) | 4
Mykhailo Shelest (UKR) | 1
Omar El-Yazidi (FRA) | 10
Tuarai Hery (FPO) | 1
Arman-Marshall Silla (BLR) | 15
Jesús Perea (ECU) | 0
Yang Yi (CHN) | 3
Stephen Lambdin (USA) | 4

Round of 16
Anthony Obame (GAB) | 3
Omar El-Yazidi (FRA) | 1
Arman-Marshall Silla (BLR) | 0
Stephen Lambdin (USA) | 3^{R}

Quarterfinals
Anthony Obame (GAB) | 3
Stephen Lambdin (USA) | 1

==== Section 2 ====
Round of 64
Itai Sango (MOZ) | 2
Firmin Zokou (CIV) | 14
Alisher Gulov (TJK) | 2
Teemu Heino (FIN) | 6
Toumani Diabaté (MLI) | 5
Guilherme Félix (BRA) | 9
Jo Chol-ho (KOR) | DQ
~~Pita Taufatofua (TGA)~~
Đorđe Marčetić (SRB) | 2
Ali Sarı (TUR) | 3
~~Rémy Alazoula (CAF)~~
Abdelrahman El-Hendi (EGY) | DQ

Round of 32
Mahama Cho (GBR) | 6
Firmin Zokou (CIV) | 7
Teemu Heino (FIN) | 4
Guilherme Félix (BRA) | 5
Jo Chol-ho (KOR) | 3
Ali Sarı (TUR) | 0
Abdelrahman El-Hendi (EGY) | 1
Oleg Kuznetsov (RUS) | 2

Round of 16
Firmin Zokou (CIV) | 7
Guilherme Félix (BRA) | 6
Jo Chol-ho (KOR) | 6
Oleg Kuznetsov (RUS) | 3

Quarterfinals
Firmin Zokou (CIV) | 8
Jo Chol-ho (KOR) | 7

=== Bottom half ===
==== Section 3 ====
Round of 64
Martin Cedras (SYC) | DQ
~~Wisam Sattar (IRQ)~~
Abdoul Razak Issoufou (NIG) | 1
Tseng Tzu-yi (TPE) | 0
Peter Vassily (AUS) | 2
Robelis Despaigne (CUB) | 14^{P}
Jordan Stewart (CAN) | 0
Chika Chukwumerije (NGR) | 3
Mohamed El-Kharzazi (MAR) | 15
Md Mizanur Rahman (BAN) | 3

Round of 32
Sajjad Mardani (IRI) | 9^{R}
Martin Cedras (SYC) | 0
Abdoul Razak Issoufou (NIG) | 1
Robelis Despaigne (CUB) | 4
Ivan Trajkovič (SLO) | 6
Chika Chukwumerije (NGR) | 7
Mohamed El-Kharzazi (MAR) | 5
Vedran Golec (CRO) | 10^{W}

Round of 16
Sajjad Mardani (IRI) | 4
Robelis Despaigne (CUB) | 5
Chika Chukwumerije (NGR) | 5
Vedran Golec (CRO) | 3

Quarterfinals
Robelis Despaigne (CUB) | 9
Chika Chukwumerije (NGR) | 4

==== Section 4 ====
Round of 64
Shane Lynch (IRL) | 1
Víctor Ballesteros (MEX) | 4
Demetris Moustakas (CYP) | 5
Jayson Grant (JAM) | 6
Martín Sio (ARG) | 5
Leonardo Zamora (CHI) | 2
~~Mohamed Hamid (SUD)~~
Piotr Hatowski (POL) | DQ
Ruslan Zhaparov (KAZ) | 9
Konstantinos Gkoltsios (GRE) | 11

Round of 32
Leonardo Basile (ITA) | 4
Víctor Ballesteros (MEX) | 2
Jayson Grant (JAM) | 1
Dmitriy Shokin (UZB) | 13
Martín Sio (ARG) | 5
Piotr Hatowski (POL) | 2
Konstantinos Gkoltsios (GRE) | 2
Volker Wodzich (GER) | 3

Round of 16
Leonardo Basile (ITA) | 2
Dmitriy Shokin (UZB) | 8
Martín Sio (ARG) | 2
Volker Wodzich (GER) | 3

Quarterfinals
Dmitriy Shokin (UZB) | 11
Volker Wodzich (GER) | 2
