= Gabon at the 2012 Summer Olympics =

- IOC code: GAB
- NOC: Comité Olympique Gabonais

in London
- Competitors: 24 in 5 sports
- Flag bearer: Ruddy Zang Milama
- Medals Ranked 69th: Gold 0 Silver 1 Bronze 0 Total 1

Summer Olympics appearances (overview)
- 1972; 1976–1980; 1984; 1988; 1992; 1996; 2000; 2004; 2008; 2012; 2016; 2020; 2024

Gabon competed at the 2012 Summer Olympics in London, from 27 July to 12 August 2012. This was the nation's ninth appearance at the Olympics; the nation did not participate at the 1976 Summer Olympics in Montreal and 1980 Summer Olympics in Moscow, affected by the African and the American-led boycott, respectively.

The Gabon Olympic Committee (French: Comité Olympique Gabonais) sent the nation's largest delegation ever to the Games. A total of 24 athletes, 22 men and 2 women, competed in 5 sports. Men's football was the only team sport in which Gabon was represented at these Olympic games. Sprinter Ruddy Zang Milama was the nation's flag bearer at the opening ceremony.

Gabon left London with its first ever Olympic medal. Taekwondo jin Anthony Obame won the silver in the men's super heavyweight division, narrowly losing to Italy's Carlo Molfetta in the final.

== Medalists ==
Medal	Name	Sport	Event	Date
Silver	Anthony Obame	Taekwondo	Men's +80 kg	11 August

== Athletics ==
Gabonese athletes have so far achieved qualifying standards in the following athletics events (up to a maximum of 3 athletes in each event at the 'A' Standard, and 1 at the 'B' Standard):

Key

- Note–Ranks given for track events are within the athlete's heat only
- Q = Qualified for the next round
- q = Qualified for the next round as a fastest loser or, in field events, by position without achieving the qualifying target
- NR = National record
- N/A = Round not applicable for the event
- Bye = Athlete not required to compete in round

Men

Athlete	Event	Heat		Quarterfinal		Semifinal		Final	
Athlete	Event	Result	Rank	Result	Rank	Result	Rank	Result	Rank
Wilfried Bingangoye	100 m	10.89	3	Did not advance					

Women

Athlete	Event	Heat		Quarterfinal		Semifinal		Final	
Athlete	Event	Result	Rank	Result	Rank	Result	Rank	Result	Rank
Ruddy Zang Milama	100 m	Bye		11.14	3 Q	11.31	7	Did not advance	

== Boxing ==
Gabon has so far qualified boxers for the following events

Men

Athlete	Event	Round of 32	Round of 16	Quarterfinals	Semifinals	Final	
Athlete	Event	Opposition Result	Opposition Result	Opposition Result	Opposition Result	Opposition Result	Rank
Braexir Lemboumba	Bantamweight	Encarnación (DOM); L 6–15	Did not advance				
Yannick Mbemy	Welterweight	Tüvshinbat (MGL); L 4–17	Did not advance				

== Football ==
Gabon's men's football team has qualified.

=== Men's tournament ===
Team roster

The following is the Gabon squad in the men's football tournament of the 2012 Summer Olympics.

Coach: Claude Albert Mbourounot

No.	Pos.	Player	Date of birth (age)	Caps	Goals	2012 club
1	GK	Didier Ovono* (c)	23 January 1983 (aged 29)			(French Football Federation) Le Mans
2	DF	Muller Dinda	22 September 1995 (aged 16)			(Gabonese Football Federation) Cercle Mbéri
3	DF	Stevy Nzambe	4 September 1991 (aged 20)			(French Football Federation) Marseille
4	MF	Franck Engonga	26 July 1993 (aged 19)			(Gabonese Football Federation) USM Libreville
5	DF	Bruno Ecuele Manga*	16 July 1988 (aged 24)			(French Football Federation) Lorient
6	DF	Rémy Ebanega	17 November 1989 (aged 22)			(Gabonese Football Federation) Bitam
7	FW	Allen Nono	15 August 1992 (aged 19)			(Gabonese Football Federation) USM Libreville
8	MF	Alexander N'Doumbou	4 January 1992 (aged 20)			(French Football Federation) Orléans
9	FW	Pierre-Emerick Aubameyang	18 June 1989 (aged 23)			(French Football Federation) Saint-Étienne
10	MF	Lévy Madinda	11 June 1992 (aged 20)			(Royal Spanish Football Federation) Celta Vigo B
11	FW	Axel Meye	6 June 1995 (aged 17)			(Gabonese Football Federation) Bitam
12	MF	Merlin Tandjigora	6 April 1990 (aged 22)			(French Football Federation) Carquefou
13	MF	Cédric Boussoughou	20 July 1991 (aged 21)			(Gabonese Football Federation) Mangasport
14	MF	André Biyogo Poko	1 January 1993 (aged 19)			(French Football Federation) Bordeaux
15	MF	Henri Ndong	23 August 1992 (aged 19)			(Gabonese Football Federation) Bitam
16	DF	Emmanuel Ndong	4 May 1992 (aged 20)			(Gabonese Football Federation) Sogéa
17	MF	Jerry Obiang	10 June 1992 (aged 20)			(Gabonese Football Federation) Sogéa
18	GK	Anthony Mfa Mezui	7 March 1991 (aged 21)			(French Football Federation) Metz
21	MF	Samson Mbingui	9 February 1992 (aged 20)			(Gabonese Football Federation) Mangasport

* Over-aged player.

Group play

Pos	Team	Pld	W	D	L	GF	GA	GD	Pts	Qualification
1	Mexico	3	2	1	0	3	0	+3	7	Advance to knockout stage
2	South Korea	3	1	2	0	2	1	+1	5	Advance to knockout stage
3	Gabon	3	0	2	1	1	3	−2	2	
4	Switzerland	3	0	1	2	2	4	−2	1	

Source: FIFA
Rules for classification: Group stage tiebreakers
26 July 2012
17:15

Gabon	1–1	Switzerland
Aubameyang 45'	Report	Mehmedi 5' (pen.)

St James' Park, Newcastle
Attendance: 15,748
Referee: Wilmar Roldán (Colombia)

29 July 2012
14:30

Mexico	2–0	Gabon
Dos Santos 63', 90+2' (pen.)	Report

Ricoh Arena, Coventry
Attendance: 28,171
Referee: Ben Williams (Australia)

1 August 2012
17:00

South Korea	0–0	Gabon
	Report

Wembley Stadium, London
Attendance: 76,927
Referee: Pavel Královec (Czech Republic)

== Judo ==
Athlete	Event	Round of 32	Round of 16	Quarterfinals	Semifinals	Repechage	Final / BM	
Athlete	Event	Opposition Result	Opposition Result	Opposition Result	Opposition Result	Opposition Result	Opposition Result	Rank
Audrey Koumba	Women's −78 kg	Ntahonvukiye (BDI); W 0020–0000	Joó (HUN); L 0000–0100	Did not advance				

== Taekwondo ==
Athlete	Event	Round of 16	Quarterfinals	Semifinals	Repechage	Bronze Medal	Final	
Athlete	Event	Opposition Result	Opposition Result	Opposition Result	Opposition Result	Opposition Result	Opposition Result	Rank
Anthony Obame	Men's +80 kg	Thomsen-Fuataga (SAM); W 9–2	Despaigne (CUB); W 1–0 SDP	Tanrıkulu (TUR); W 3–2	Bye		Molfetta (ITA); L 9–9 SUP	2nd place, silver medalist(s)
