= Gabon at the 2004 Summer Olympics =

- IOC code: GAB
- NOC: Gabonese Olympic Committee

in Athens
- Competitors: 6 in 4 sports
- Flag bearer: Mélanie Engoang
- Medals: Gold 0 Silver 0 Bronze 0 Total 0

Summer Olympics appearances (overview)
- 1972; 1976–1980; 1984; 1988; 1992; 1996; 2000; 2004; 2008; 2012; 2016; 2020; 2024

Gabon was represented at the 2004 Summer Olympics in Athens, Greece by the Gabonese Olympic Committee.

In total, five athletes including three men and two women represented Gabon in four different sports including athletics, boxing and judo.

== Competitors ==
In total, five athletes represented Gabon at the 2004 Summer Olympics in Athens, Greece across four different sports.

Sport	Men	Women	Total
Athletics	1	1	2
Boxing	2	–	2
Judo	0	1	1
Total	3	2	5

== Athletics ==
In total, two Gabonese athletes participated in the athletics events – Wilfried Bingangoye in the men's 100 m and Marlyse Nsourou in the women's 800 m.

The heats for the men's 100 m took place on 21 August 2004. Bingangoye finished eighth in his heat in a time of 10.76 seconds and he did not advance to the quarter-finals.

Athlete	Event	Heat		Quarterfinal		Semifinal		Final	
Athlete	Event	Result	Rank	Result	Rank	Result	Rank	Result	Rank
Wilfried Bingangoye	100 m	10.76	8	did not advance					

The heats for the women's 800 m took place on 20 August 2004. Nsourou finished seventh in her heat in a time of two minutes 12.35 seconds and she did not advance to the semi-finals.

Athlete	Event	Heat		Semifinal		Final	
Athlete	Event	Result	Rank	Result	Rank	Result	Rank
Marlyse Nsourou	800 m	2:12.35 NR	7	did not advance			

== Boxing ==
In total, two Gabonese athletes participated in the boxing events – Taylor Mabika in the light heavyweight category and Petit Jesus Ngnitedem in the bantamweight category.

The first round of the light heavyweight category took place on 14 August 2004. Mabika lost to Elias Pavlidis of Greece and was eliminated from the competition.

The first round of the bantamweight category took place on 17 August 2004. Ngnitedem lost to Nestor Bolum of Nigeria and was eliminated from the competition.

Athlete	Event	Round of 32	Round of 16	Quarterfinals	Semifinals	Final	
Athlete	Event	Opposition Result	Opposition Result	Opposition Result	Opposition Result	Opposition Result	Rank
Petit Jesus Ngnitedem	Bantamweight	Bolum (NGR); L 17–23	did not advance				
Taylor Mabika	Light heavyweight	Pavlidis (GRE); L 17–32	did not advance				

== Judo ==
In total, one Gabonese athlete participated in the judo events – Mélanie Engoang in the women's −78 kg category.

The women's –78 kg category took place on 19 August 2004. In the first round, Engoang lost by ippon to Amy Cotton of Canada.

Athlete	Event	Round of 32	Round of 16	Quarterfinals	Semifinals	Repechage 1	Repechage 2	Repechage 3	Final / BM	
Athlete	Event	Opposition Result	Opposition Result	Opposition Result	Opposition Result	Opposition Result	Opposition Result	Opposition Result	Opposition Result	Rank
Mélanie Engoang	Women's −78 kg	Cotton (CAN); L 0000–1000	did not advance							
