= Gabon at the 2020 Summer Olympics =

- IOC code: GAB
- NOC: Comité Olympique Gabonais

in Tokyo, Japan July 23, 2021 – August 8, 2021
- Competitors: 5 in 4 sports
- Flag bearers (opening): Aya Mpali; Anthony Obame
- Flag bearer (closing): N/A
- Medals: Gold 0 Silver 0 Bronze 0 Total 0

Summer Olympics appearances (overview)
- 1972; 1976–1980; 1984; 1988; 1992; 1996; 2000; 2004; 2008; 2012; 2016; 2020; 2024

Gabon competed at the 2020 Summer Olympics in Tokyo. Originally scheduled to take place from 24 July to 9 August 2020, the Games were postponed to 23 July to 8 August 2021, because of the COVID-19 pandemic. It was the nation's eleventh appearance at the Summer Olympics.

Gabon failed to secure a single medal for a second time after their previous poor performance in the 2016 Summer Olympics.

== Competitors ==
The following is the list of number of competitors in the Games.

| Sport | Men | Women | Total |
|---|---|---|---|
| Athletics | 1 | 0 | 1 |
| Judo | 0 | 1 | 1 |
| Swimming | 1 | 1 | 2 |
| Taekwondo | 1 | 0 | 1 |
| Total | 3 | 2 | 5 |

== Athletics ==
Gabon received universality slots from IAAF to send one athletes to the Olympics.

Key

- Note–Ranks given for track events are within the athlete's heat only
- Q = Qualified for the next round
- q = Qualified for the next round as a fastest loser or, in field events, by position without achieving the qualifying target
- NR = National record
- N/A = Round not applicable for the event
- Bye = Athlete not required to compete in round

Track & road events

| Athlete | Event | Heat | | Quarterfinal | | Semifinal | | Final | |
| Athlete | Event | Result | Rank | Result | Rank | Result | Rank | Result | Rank |
|---|---|---|---|---|---|---|---|---|---|
| Guy Maganga Gorra | Men's 100 m | 10.61 | 2 Q | 10.77 | 8 | Did not advance | | | |

== Judo ==
Gabon qualified one judoka for the women's half-heavyweight category (78 kg) at the Games. Sarah-Myriam Mazouz accepted a continental berth from Africa as the nation's top-ranked judoka outside of direct qualifying position in the IJF World Ranking List of June 28, 2021.

| Athlete | Event | Round of 32 | Round of 16 | Quarterfinals | Semifinals | Repechage | Final / BM | |
| Athlete | Event | Opposition Result | Opposition Result | Opposition Result | Opposition Result | Opposition Result | Opposition Result | Rank |
|---|---|---|---|---|---|---|---|---|
| Sarah-Myriam Mazouz | Women's –78 kg | Pacut (POL); L 00–01 | Did not advance | | | | | |

== Swimming ==
Gabon received a universality invitation from FINA to send two top-ranked swimmers (one per gender) in their respective individual events to the Olympics, based on the FINA Points System of June 28, 2021.

| Athlete | Event | Heat | | Semifinal | | Final | |
| Athlete | Event | Time | Rank | Time | Rank | Time | Rank |
|---|---|---|---|---|---|---|---|
| Adam Mpali | Men's 50 m freestyle | 27.66 | 68 | Did not advance | | | |
| Aya Mpali | Women's 50 m freestyle | 32.24 | 77 | Did not advance | | | |

== Taekwondo ==
Gabon entered one athlete into the taekwondo competition at the Games. London 2012 silver medalist and 2013 world champion Anthony Obame secured a spot in the men's heavyweight category (+80 kg) with a top two finish at the 2020 African Qualification Tournament in Rabat, Morocco.

| Athlete | Event | Round of 16 | Quarterfinals | Semifinals | Repechage | Final / BM | |
| Athlete | Event | Opposition Result | Opposition Result | Opposition Result | Opposition Result | Opposition Result | Rank |
|---|---|---|---|---|---|---|---|
| Anthony Obame | Men's +80 kg | Trajkovic (SLO); L 5–26 PTG | Did not advance | | | | |
