= List of Gabonese records in swimming =

The Gabonese records in swimming are the fastest ever performances of swimmers from Gabon, which are recognised and ratified by the Fédération Gabonaise de Natation.

All records were set in finals unless noted otherwise.

== Long Course (50 m) ==
=== Men ===
Event	Time		Name	Club	Date	Meet	Location	Ref
50 m freestyle	27.21	h	Maël Ambonguilat	Gabon	11 August 2016	Olympic Games	Rio de Janeiro, Brazil	
100 m freestyle	1:01.38		Maël Ambonguilat	-	23 April 2016	IM50	Reykjavík, Iceland	
200 m freestyle								
400 m freestyle								
800 m freestyle								
1500 m freestyle								
50 m backstroke								
100 m backstroke								
200 m backstroke								
50 m breaststroke	36.68	h	Adam Mpali	Gabon	21 August 2019	African Games	Casablanca, Morocco	
100 m breaststroke								
200 m breaststroke								
50 m butterfly	32.80		Saturnin Mpali	Gabon	13 August 2015	World Masters Championships	Kazan, Russia	
100 m butterfly								
200 m butterfly								
200 m individual medley								
400 m individual medley								
4×100 m freestyle relay								
4×200 m freestyle relay								
4×100 m medley relay								

Legend: # – Record awaiting ratification by Fédération Gabonaise de Natation; WR – World record; AF – African record;
Records not set in finals: h – heat; sf – semifinal; r – relay 1st leg; rh – relay heat 1st leg; b – B final; † – en route to final mark; so – swim-off; tt – time trial

=== Women ===
Event	Time		Name	Club	Date	Meet	Location	Ref
50 m freestyle	27.49	h	Noelie Lacour	Gabon	9 May 2026	African Championships	Oran, Algeria	
100 m freestyle	1:00.00	h	Noelie Lacour	Gabon	5 May 2026	African Championships	Oran, Algeria	
200 m freestyle	2:17.86		Noelie Lacour	Gabon	3 October 2025	African Zone 2 Championships	Accra, Ghana	
400 m freestyle	5:07.99		Noelie Lacour	Gabon	4 October 2025	African Zone 2 Championships	Accra, Ghana	
800 m freestyle	11:03.85		Noelie Lacour	Gabon	4 October 2025	African Zone 2 Championships	Accra, Ghana	
1500 m freestyle								
50 m backstroke	31.20		Axelle Moulenda-Perroy	Gabon	7 May 2026	African Championships	Oran, Algeria	
100 m backstroke	1:06.63		Axelle Moulenda-Perroy	Gabon	8 May 2026	African Championships	Oran, Algeria	
200 m backstroke								
50 m breaststroke	44.66		Sara Ghitou	Gabon	6 December 2023	CANA Junior Championships	Mauritius	
100 m breaststroke								
200 m breaststroke								
50 m butterfly	28.18	h	Noelie Lacour	Gabon	24 July 2026	Commonwealth Games	Glasgow, United Kingdom	
100 m butterfly	1:05.23	h	Noelie Lacour	Gabon	26 July 2026	Commonwealth Games	Glasgow, United Kingdom	
200 m butterfly	2:45.21		Noelie Lacour	Gabon	5 October 2025	African Zone 2 Championships	Accra, Ghana	
200 m individual medley	2:54.09		Noelie Lacour	Gabon	5 October 2025	African Zone 2 Championships	Accra, Ghana	
400 m individual medley								
4×100 m freestyle relay								
4×200 m freestyle relay								
4×100 m medley relay								

Legend: # – Record awaiting ratification by Fédération Gabonaise de Natation; WR – World record; AF – African record;
Records not set in finals: h – heat; sf – semifinal; r – relay 1st leg; rh – relay heat 1st leg; b – B final; † – en route to final mark; so – swim-off; tt – time trial

== Short Course (25 m) ==
=== Men ===
Event	Time	Name	Club	Date	Meet	Location	Ref
50 m freestyle	26.97	Saturnin Mpali	-	29 May 2016	Gabonese Championships	Libreville, Gabon	
100 m freestyle	1:00.41	Maël Ambonguilat	-	29 May 2016	Gabonese Championships	Libreville, Gabon	
200 m freestyle							
400 m freestyle							
800 m freestyle							
1500 m freestyle							
50 m backstroke	36.92	Maël Ambonguilat	-	14 December 2014	Gabonese Championships	Libreville, Gabon	
100 m backstroke							
200 m backstroke							
50 m breaststroke	37.67	Tarann Ambonguilat	-	14 April 2019	Finale de la Ligue	Libreville, Gabon	
100 m breaststroke	1:24.69	Adam Mpali	-	16 November 2019	Championnat Departemental	Périgueux, France	
200 m breaststroke							
50 m butterfly	30.78	Saturnin Mpali	-	29 May 2016	Gabonese Championships	Libreville, Gabon	
100 m butterfly							
200 m butterfly							
100 m individual medley							
200 m individual medley							
400 m individual medley							
4×50 m freestyle relay							
4×100 m freestyle relay							
4×200 m freestyle relay							
4×50 m medley relay							
4×100 m medley relay							

Legend: # – Record awaiting ratification by Fédération Gabonaise de Natation; WR – World record; AF – African record;
Records not set in finals: h – heat; sf – semifinal; r – relay 1st leg; rh – relay heat 1st leg; b – B final; † – en route to final mark; so – swim-off; tt – time trial

=== Women ===
Event	Time		Name	Club	Date	Meet	Location	Ref
50 m freestyle	27.01	h	Noelie Lacour	Gabon	14 December 2024	World Championships	Budapest, Hungary	
100 m freestyle								
200 m freestyle								
400 m freestyle								
800 m freestyle								
1500 m freestyle								
50 m backstroke								
100 m backstroke								
200 m backstroke								
50 m breaststroke	44.25		Sara Ghitou	-	2 June 2019	Gabonese Championships	Libreville, Gabon	
100 m breaststroke								
200 m breaststroke								
50 m butterfly	37.61		Aya Mpali	Gabon	11 September 2019	African Junior Championships	Tunis, Algeria	
100 m butterfly								
200 m butterfly								
100 m individual medley								
200 m individual medley								
400 m individual medley								
4×50 m freestyle relay								
4×100 m freestyle relay								
4×200 m freestyle relay								
4×50 m medley relay								
4×100 m medley relay								

Legend: # – Record awaiting ratification by Fédération Gabonaise de Natation; WR – World record; AF – African record;
Records not set in finals: h – heat; sf – semifinal; r – relay 1st leg; rh – relay heat 1st leg; b – B final; † – en route to final mark; so – swim-off; tt – time trial
