= 2017 World Taekwondo Championships – Men's heavyweight =

Taekwondo competition

Men's heavyweight at the 2017 World Championships
- Venue: Taekwondowon
- Dates: 28–29 June 2017
- Competitors: 50 from 50 nations

Medalists
gold medal	Abdoul Razak Issoufou	Niger
silver medal	Mahama Cho	Great Britain
bronze medal	Anthony Obame	Gabon
bronze medal	Roman Kuznetsov	Russia

The men's heavyweight is a competition featured at the 2017 World Taekwondo Championships, and was held at the Taekwondowon in Muju County, South Korea on June 28 and June 29. Heavyweights were limited to a minimum of 87 kilograms in body mass.

== Results ==
Legend

- DQ — Won by disqualification
- P — Won by punitive declaration
- R — Won by referee stop contest
- W — Won by withdrawal

=== Finals ===
Semifinals		Final
Anthony Obame (GAB)	9
Abdoul Razak Issoufou (NIG)	16	Abdoul Razak Issoufou (NIG)	9
Mahama Cho (GBR)	22	Mahama Cho (GBR)	4
Roman Kuznetsov (RUS)	4

=== Top half ===
==== Section 1 ====
Round of 64
Pablo Fernández (ESP)	8
Ayoub Bassel (MAR)	11
Marc-André Bergeron (CAN)	7
Tian Jian (CHN)	14^{P}
Mohamed Abdellahi Barka (MTN)	1
Piotr Hatowski (POL)	32^{R}
Tseng Tzu-yi (TPE)	8
Jesús Perea (ECU)	9
Mykhailo Shelest (UKR)	24
Md Mizanur Rahman (BAN)	3

Round of 32
Radik Isayev (AZE)	24
Ayoub Bassel (MAR)	8
Tian Jian (CHN)	15
Piotr Hatowski (POL)	8
Vedran Golec (CRO)	28^{P}
Jesús Perea (ECU)	11
Mykhailo Shelest (UKR)	2
Anthony Obame (GAB)	4

Round of 16
Radik Isayev (AZE)	16
Tian Jian (CHN)	11
Vedran Golec (CRO)	12
Anthony Obame (GAB)	14

Quarterfinals
Radik Isayev (AZE)	13
Anthony Obame (GAB)	15

==== Section 2 ====
Round of 64
Toumani Diabaté (MLI)	DQ
~~Pita Taufatofua (TGA)~~
Víctor Ballesteros (MEX)	28
Pium Sanjeewa (SRI)	13
Emille Jacobs (SKN)	0
Firmin Zokou (CIV)	23^{R}
Kristopher Uy (PHI)	15
Dejan Georgievski (MKD)	3

Round of 32
Abdoul Razak Issoufou (NIG)	23
Toumani Diabaté (MLI)	5
Víctor Ballesteros (MEX)	5
Omar El-Yazidi (FRA)	11
Maicon Andrade (BRA)	14
Firmin Zokou (CIV)	13
Kristopher Uy (PHI)	13
Jo Chol-ho (KOR)	26

Round of 16
Abdoul Razak Issoufou (NIG)	17
Omar El-Yazidi (FRA)	8
Maicon Andrade (BRA)	11
Jo Chol-ho (KOR)	9

Quarterfinals
Abdoul Razak Issoufou (NIG)	9
Maicon Andrade (BRA)	6

=== Bottom half ===
==== Section 3 ====
Round of 64
Jaxon Simmonds (AUS)	12
Teemu Heino (FIN)	16
Ruslan Zhaparov (KAZ)	DQ
~~Clyde Sade Rika (SOL)~~
Juan Pablo López (NCA)	2
Marko Đuričić (SRB)	23
Jayson Grant (JAM)	18
Itai Sango (MOZ)	9

Round of 32
Sajjad Mardani (IRI)	11
Teemu Heino (FIN)	6
Ruslan Zhaparov (KAZ)	21
Tuarai Hery (FPO)	1
Arman-Marshall Silla (BLR)	20^{R}
Marko Đuričić (SRB)	5
Jayson Grant (JAM)
Mahama Cho (GBR)	W

Round of 16
Sajjad Mardani (IRI)	8
Ruslan Zhaparov (KAZ)	6
Arman-Marshall Silla (BLR)	12
Mahama Cho (GBR)	23

Quarterfinals
Sajjad Mardani (IRI)	1
Mahama Cho (GBR)	14

==== Section 4 ====
Round of 64
~~Mohcene Boukercha (ALG)~~
Hamza Kattan (JOR)	DQ
Mohamed Ayman (EGY)	15
Nakul Malhotra (IND)	5
Martín Sio (ARG)	19^{P}
Luis Álvarez (VEN)	13
Mohamed El-Holi (LBA)	1
Robelis Despaigne (CUB)	18
Serdar Yüksel (TUR)	8
Athanasios Nikolaidis (GRE)	7

Round of 32
Stephen Lambdin (USA)	28
Hamza Kattan (JOR)	15
Mohamed Ayman (EGY)	7
Roman Kuznetsov (RUS)	12
Martín Sio (ARG)	6
Robelis Despaigne (CUB)	8
Serdar Yüksel (TUR)	0
Dmitriy Shokin (UZB)	12

Round of 16
Stephen Lambdin (USA)	5
Roman Kuznetsov (RUS)	7
Robelis Despaigne (CUB)	7
Dmitriy Shokin (UZB)	17

Quarterfinals
Roman Kuznetsov (RUS)	9
Dmitriy Shokin (UZB)	7
