= List of Gabonese records in athletics =

The following are the national records in athletics in Gabon maintained by Gabon's national athletics federation: Fédération Gabonaise d'Athlétisme.

== Outdoor ==
Key to tables: Awaiting ratification Record not kept by Fédération Gabonaise d'Athlétisme Not ratified or later rescinded by Fédération Gabonaise d'Athlétisme

=== Men ===
Event	Record	Athlete	Date	Meet	Place	Ref.
100 m	10.13 (+1.3 m/s)	Antoine Boussombo	4 August 2000		Nice, France	
100 m	10.13 (+1.9 m/s)	Antoine Boussombo	22 September 2000	Olympic Games	Sydney, Australia	
150 m	15.76 A (−0.5 m/s)	Wissy Hoye	8 February 2025	Curro Podium Grand Finale & Simbine Classic Shootout	Pretoria, South Africa	
200 m	20.37 (+1.2 m/s)	Guy Maganga Gorra	13 July 2025	Meeting Bouvet-Bionda	Thonon-les-Bains, France	
300 m	34.05	Alhagie Salim Drammeh	17 May 2012		Langenthal, Switzerland	
400 m	46.44	Alhagie Salim Drammeh	2 August 2015	UKCAU Inter-Counties Championships	Bedford, Great Britain	
800 m	1:48.45	Franck Matamba	3 June 1994		Caluire, France	
1500 m	3:43.58	Jean-Marc Léandro	30 July 1999		Niort, France	
3000 m	8:28.01	Jean-Marc Léandro	24 June 1992		Martigues, France	
5000 m	14:53.36	Jean-Marc Léandro	7 June 2008		Cannes-la-Bocca, France	
10,000 m	30:30.5 h	Jérôme Abi	20 July 1978	All-Africa Games	Algiers, Algeria	
Half marathon	1:14:01	Jean-Nestor Moungomo	29 September 1996		Palma, Spain	
Marathon	2:31:59	Jean-Marc Leandro	9 November 2008		Cannes, France	
110 m hurdles	14.52 NWI	Junior Effa Effa	22 June 2017		Longjumeau, France	
400 m hurdles	55.32	Daniel Ololo	22 July 1978	All-Africa Games	Algiers, Algeria	
3000 m steeplechase	9:31.2 h	Philémon Moupaka	1 April 1979		Libreville, Gabon	
High jump	2.14 m	Hilaire Onwanlélé	6 April 1990		Libreville, Gabon	
Pole vault	4.50 m	Sylvain Lindzondzo	8 August 1981		Valbonne, France	
Long jump	7.45 m	François Réténo	28 June 1992		Belle Vue Maurel, Mauritius	
Triple jump	15.53 m (+0.5 m/s)	Yvon Nguema N'Goua	17 September 1999	All-Africa Games	Johannesburg, South Africa	
Shot put	16.02 m	Siegfried-Luccioni Mve	16 July 2016		Aubagne, France	
Discus throw	48.55 m	Siegfried Luccioni Mve	11 September 2011	All-Africa Games	Maputo, Mozambique	
Hammer throw	12.24 m	Edouard Mihindou Mihindou	6 May 2006		Talence, France	
Javelin throw	60.40 m	Jean-Louis Mézui Assa	25 February 1990		Abidjan, Côte d'Ivoire	
Decathlon	7253 pts	Thierry Saint-Jean Makiemba	17–18 June 2005		Alès, France	
Decathlon	100m (wind) / Long jump (wind) / Shot put / High jump / 400m / 110m H (wind) / Discus / Pole vault / Javelin / 1500m; 11.30 / 7.19 m / 12.27 m / 2.07 m / 50.95 / 14.85 / 41.50 m / 4.20 m / 44.10 m / 4:53.32					
20 km walk (road)						
50 km walk (road)						
4 × 100 m relay	39.5 h	Gabon; Charles Tayot; L. Dovy; Patrick Mocci-Raoumbe; Antoine Boussombo	3 September 1997	Jeux de la Francophonie	Antananarivo, Madagascar	
4 × 400 m relay	3:14.1	Gabon; H. Nzengue; A. Ondo; Charles Tayot; Franck Matamba	16 April 1995		Yaoundé, Cameroon	

=== Women ===
Event	Record	Athlete	Date	Meet	Place	Ref.
100 y	10.30+ (+1.1 m/s)	Ruddy Zang Milama	31 May 2011	Golden Spike Ostrava	Ostrava, Czech Republic	
100 m	11.03 (+1.1 m/s)	Ruddy Zang Milama	19 May 2012	Quantum Invitational Track & Field Classic	Port-of-Spain, Trinidad and Tobago	
100 m	11.03 (+1.6 m/s)	Ruddy Zang Milama	16 June 2012	French Championships	Angers, France	
200 m	23.54 A (+0.9 m/s)	Ruddy Zang Milama	31 July 2010	African Championships	Nairobi, Kenya	
400 m	56.73	Marlyse N'Sourou Menene	13 June 2007		Avellino, Italy	
800 m	2:11.89	Marlyse N'Sourou Menene	27 June 2007		Celle Ligure, Italy	
1500 m	4:32.40	Josiane Aboungono	23 July 2000		Paris, France	
3000 m	9:51.83	Josiane Aboungono	19 July 2000		Saint-Maur, France	
5000 m	17:04.70	Josiane Aboungono	12 July 2000		Saint-Maur, France	
10,000 m	41:33.49	Véronique Bingouma	23 August 1997		Ibadan, Nigeria	
15 km (road)	57:04.8	Josiane Abougone	7 June 2009		Mississauga, Ontario, Canada	
Half marathon	1:16:23	Josiane Aboungono	19 Apr 2009	Marathon Oasis de Montréal	Montreal, Quebec, Canada	
Marathon	2:49:14	Josiane Aboungono	9 April 2000		Paris, France	
100 m hurdles	14.49	Ruddy Zang Milama	26 October 2008		La Roche-sur-Yon, France	
400 m hurdles	1:04.81	Geneviève Obone	27 June 1992		Belle Vue Maurel, Mauritius	
3000 m steeplechase						
High jump	1.75 m	Fernande Agnentchoué	28 July 1982		Vichy, France	
Pole vault						
Long jump	5.88 m	Anne-Lise Montoulieu	15 July 1983		Ermont, France	
Triple jump	11.11 m	Armelle Otola	11 June 1994		Chalon-sur-Saône, France	
Shot put	15.51 m	Odette Mistoul	15 July 1984		Rabat, Morocco	
Discus throw	36.31 m	Odette Mistoul	20 April 1986		Libreville, Gabon	
Hammer throw	61.25 m	Kenza-Gwendolyne Falana	16 July 2026	French U20 Championships	Paris, France	
Javelin throw	39.39 m	Rose de Mars Mboulet	3 October 2010		Aix-les-Bains, France	
Heptathlon	2665 pts	Karnella Anguezomo Mintsa	17–18 April 2015		Bourges, France	
Heptathlon	100m H (wind) / High jump / Shot put / 200m (wind) / Long jump (wind) / Javelin / 800m; 20.29 (+0.7) / 1.38m / 7.75m / 29.16 (-0.7) / 4.05 (-0.8) / 27.39m / 3:16.98					
20 km walk (road)						
4 × 100 m relay	47.9 h	Gabon; Genevieve Obone; Marie-Jeanne Binga; Nbaunde; Najewe	14 June 1996		Yaoundé, Cameroon	
4 × 400 m relay	3:54.8	Gabon; Genevieve Obone; F. Azogoua; P. Obone; Diane Zancy	16 June 1996		Yaoundé, Cameroon	

== Indoor ==
=== Men ===
Event	Record	Athlete	Date	Meet	Place	Ref.
60 m	6.64	Patrick Mocci-Raoumbe	20 February 2000	Meeting Pas de Calais	Liévin, France	
200 m	21.02	Guy Maganga Gorra	13 February 2021		Lynchburg, United States	
400 m	54.43	Edouard Mihindou	17 December 2005		Bordeaux, France	
800 m	1:56.48	Franck Matamba	27 February 1994		Bordeaux, France	
1500 m	3:48.94	Jean-Marc Leandro	28 February 1993	Meeting Pas de Calais	Liévin, France	
3000 m						
60 m hurdles	8.13	Junior Effa Effa	9 December 2017		Paris, France	
60 m hurdles	8.08	Thierry Saint-Jean	21 February 2009	Meeting Pas de Calais	Liévin, France	
High jump	2.11 m	Hilaire Onwanlele	9 January 1994		Vittel, France	
Pole vault	4.80 m	Thierry Saint-Jean	21 February 2009	Meeting Pas de Calais	Liévin, France	
Long jump	7.49 m (Note: outdoor mark ratified as absolute record)	Davy Mbita	13 December 1998		Saumur, France	
Triple jump	14.01 m	Derrick Edrich Yngangoy	7 January 2012		Orléans, France	
Triple jump	14.53 m	Derrick Edrich Yngangoy	14 January 2012	Championnats Départementaux CJESV	Vouneuil-sous-Biard, France	
Shot put	16.27 m	Luccioni Siegfried Mvé	2 December 2016		Val-de-Reuil, France	
Heptathlon	5737 pts	Thierry Saint-Jean	20–21 February 2009		Liévin, France	
Heptathlon	60m / Long jump / Shot put / High jump / 60m H / Pole vault / 1000m; 7.15 / 7.13 m / 12.94 m / 2.08 m / 8.08 / 4.80 m / 2:55.51					
5000 m walk						
4 × 400 m relay						

=== Women ===
Event	Record	Athlete	Date	Meet	Place	Ref.
60 m	7.12	Ruddy Zang Milama	3 February 2013	Russian Winter Meeting	Moscow, Russia	
200 m	23.97	Pierrick-Linda Moulin	4 February 2024	Championnats AURA Indoor	Aubière, France	
400 m	1:04.40	Ornica Agaya	16 January 2016		Nantes, France	
400 m	58.28	Pierrick-Linda Moulin	10 December 2023		Lyon, France	
800 m	2:21.57	Marlyse Nsourou	5 March 2004	World Championships	Budapest, Hungary	
1500 m						
3000 m						
60 m hurdles	9.21	Pierrick-Linda Moulin	18 December 2022		Lyon, France	
High jump	1.33 m (Note: record set during pentathlon competition)	Laura Malhaby	21 January 2012		Nice, France	
Pole vault						
Long jump	4.80 m	Omica Agaya	31 January 2015		Nantes, France	
Triple jump	10.59 m	Erika Nzé	11 January 2014		Limoges, France	
Shot put	15.28 m	Odette Mistoul	29 January 1983		Paris, France	
Pentathlon	1675 pts (Note: with 50m hurdles)	Laura Malhaby	21 January 2012		Nice, France	
Pentathlon	9.98 (50 m hurdles), 1.33 m (high jump), 6.63 m (shot put), 4.10 m (long jump), 3:23.00 (800 m)					
Pentathlon	1599 pts	Cindy Lefandy	4 January 2014		Paris, France	
Pentathlon	60m H / High jump / Shot put / Long jump / 800m; 11.73 / 1.21 m / 6.93 m / 4.56 m / 3:40.63					
3000 m walk						
4 × 400 m relay						
