= Gabon at the Olympics =

- IOC code: GAB
- NOC: Comité Olympique Gabonais
- Medals Ranked 137th: Gold 0 Silver 1 Bronze 0 Total 1

Summer appearances
- 1972; 1976–1980; 1984; 1988; 1992; 1996; 2000; 2004; 2008; 2012; 2016; 2020; 2024

Gabon has competed in 12 Summer Olympic Games since its debut in 1972. The nation has never competed in the Winter Olympic Games. On August 11, 2012, Gabon won its first Olympic medal when Anthony Obame took silver in Taekwondo (men's +80 kg weight class) at the 2012 Summer Olympics.

== Medal tables ==
=== Medals by Summer Games ===
Games	Athletes	Gold	Silver	Bronze	Total	Rank
1972 Munich	1	0	0	0	0	–
1976 Montreal	did not participate					
1980 Moscow	did not participate					
1984 Los Angeles	4	0	0	0	0	–
1988 Seoul	3	0	0	0	0	–
1992 Barcelona	8	0	0	0	0	–
1996 Atlanta	7	0	0	0	0	–
2000 Sydney	5	0	0	0	0	–
2004 Athens	6	0	0	0	0	–
2008 Beijing	4	0	0	0	0	–
2012 London	24	0	1	0	1	69
2016 Rio de Janeiro	6	0	0	0	0	–
2020 Tokyo	5	0	0	0	0	–
2024 Paris	5	0	0	0	0	–
2028 Los Angeles	future event					
2032 Brisbane	future event					
Total		0	1	0	1	137

=== Medals by sport ===
Sport	Gold	Silver	Bronze	Total
Taekwondo	0	1	0	1
Totals (1 entries)	0	1	0	1

== List of medalists ==
Medal	Name	Games	Sport	Event
Silver	Anthony Obame	2012 London	Taekwondo	Men's +80 kg

== See also ==
- List of flag bearers for Gabon at the Olympics
- Gabon at the Commonwealth Games
- Gabon at the Paralympics
