= Gabon at the 2000 Summer Olympics =

- IOC code: GAB
- NOC: Comité Olympique Gabonais

in Sydney
- Competitors: 5 (3 men and 2 women) in 3 sports
- Flag bearer: Mélanie Engoang Nguema
- Medals: Gold 0 Silver 0 Bronze 0 Total 0

Summer Olympics appearances (overview)
- 1972; 1976–1980; 1984; 1988; 1992; 1996; 2000; 2004; 2008; 2012; 2016; 2020; 2024

Gabon competed at the 2000 Summer Olympics in Sydney, Australia.

== Competitors ==
The following is the list of number of competitors in the Games.

Sport	Men	Women	Total
Athletics	1	1	2
Boxing	1	–	1
Judo	1	1	2
Total	3	2	5

== Athletics ==
Men
Track & road events

Athlete	Event	Heat		Quarterfinal		Semifinal		Final	
Athlete	Event	Result	Rank	Result	Rank	Result	Rank	Result	Rank
Antoine Boussombo	100 m	10.13	2 Q	10.27	5	Did not advance			
Antoine Boussombo	200 m	20.73	3 Q	20.71	7	Did not advance			

Women
Track & road events

Athlete	Event	Heat		Quarterfinal		Semifinal		Final	
Athlete	Event	Result	Rank	Result	Rank	Result	Rank	Result	Rank
Anais Oyembo	100 m	12.19	7	Did not advance					

== Boxing ==
Men

Athlete	Event	1 Round	2 Round	3 Round	Quarterfinals	Semifinals	Final	
Athlete	Event	Opposition Result	Opposition Result	Opposition Result	Opposition Result	Opposition Result	Opposition Result	Rank
Stephane Nzue Mba	Light Middleweight	Juan Hernández Sierra (CUB); L RSC	Did not advance					

== Judo ==
Men

Athlete	Event	Preliminary	Round of 32	Round of 16	Quarterfinals	Semifinals	Repechage 1	Repechage 2	Repechage 3	Repechage Final	Final / BM	
Athlete	Event	Opposition Result	Opposition Result	Opposition Result	Opposition Result	Opposition Result	Opposition Result	Opposition Result	Opposition Result	Opposition Result	Opposition Result	Rank
Steeve Nguema Ndong	+100 kg	BYE	Indrek Pertelson (EST); L 0000–0001	Did not advance			Ernesto Pérez (ESP); L 0000–1000	Did not advance				13

Women

Athlete	Event	Round of 32	Round of 16	Quarterfinals	Semifinals	Repechage 1	Repechage 2	Repechage Final	Final / BM	
Athlete	Event	Opposition Result	Opposition Result	Opposition Result	Opposition Result	Opposition Result	Opposition Result	Opposition Result	Opposition Result	Rank
Mélanie Engoang	−78 kg	Uta Kühnen (GER); L 0000–0100	Did not advance							17
