= Gabon at the 2024 World Aquatics Championships =

- Flag of Gabon
- FINA code: GAB
- National federation: Fédération Gabonaise de Natation

in Doha, Qatar
- Competitors: 2 in 1 sport
- Medals: Gold 0 Silver 0 Bronze 0 Total 0

World Aquatics Championships appearances
- 2015; 2017; 2019; 2022; 2023; 2024

Gabon competed at the 2024 World Aquatics Championships in Doha, Qatar from 2 to 18 February.

== Competitors ==
The following is the list of competitors in the Championships.

| Sport | Men | Women | Total |
|---|---|---|---|
| Swimming | 1 | 1 | 2 |
| Total | 1 | 1 | 2 |

== Swimming ==
Gabon entered 2 swimmers.

Men

| Athlete | Event | Heat | | Semifinal | | Final | |
| Athlete | Event | Time | Rank | Time | Rank | Time | Rank |
|---|---|---|---|---|---|---|---|
| Adam Girard de Langlade Mpali | 50 metre freestyle | 28.61 | 110 | Did not advance | | | |

Women

| Athlete | Event | Heat | | Semifinal | | Final | |
| Athlete | Event | Time | Rank | Time | Rank | Time | Rank |
|---|---|---|---|---|---|---|---|
| Aya Girard de Langlade Mpali | 50 metre freestyle | 31.40 | 94 | Did not advance | | | |
