= Gabon at the 2019 World Aquatics Championships =

- Flag of Gabon
- FINA code: GAB
- National federation: Fédération Gabonaise de Natation

in Gwangju, South Korea
- Competitors: 2 in 1 sport
- Medals: Gold 0 Silver 0 Bronze 0 Total 0

World Aquatics Championships appearances
- 2015; 2017; 2019; 2022; 2023; 2024

Gabon competed at the 2019 World Aquatics Championships in Gwangju, South Korea from 12 to 28 July.

== Swimming ==
Gabon entered two swimmers.

Men

Athlete	Event	Heat		Semifinal		Final	
Athlete	Event	Time	Rank	Time	Rank	Time	Rank
Adam Mpali	50 m freestyle	30.26	128	did not advance			

Women

Athlete	Event	Heat		Semifinal		Final	
Athlete	Event	Time	Rank	Time	Rank	Time	Rank
Aya Mpali	50 m freestyle	32.68	93	did not advance			
