= Gabon at the 1983 World Championships in Athletics =

- Flag of Gabon
- WA code: GAB

in Helsinki, Finland August 7–14, 1983
- Competitors: 2 (1 man and 1 woman) in 2 events
- Medals: Gold 0 Silver 0 Bronze 0 Total 0

World Championships in Athletics appearances
- 1983; 1987; 1991; 1993; 1995; 1997; 1999; 2001; 2003; 2005; 2007; 2009; 2011; 2013; 2015–2017; 2019; 2022; 2023

Gabon competed at the 1983 World Championships in Athletics in Helsinki, Finland, from August 7 to 14, 1983.

== Results ==
=== Men ===
Track and road events

Athlete	Event	Heat		Quarterfinals		Semifinal		Final	
Athlete	Event	Result	Rank	Result	Rank	Result	Rank	Result	Rank
Daniel Ololo	110 metres hurdles	14.93w	27	Did not advance					

=== Women ===
Field events

Athlete	Event	Qualification		Final	
Athlete	Event	Distance	Position	Distance	Position
Odette Mistoul	Shot put	14.23	18	Did not advance	
