= Gabon at the 1988 Summer Olympics =

- IOC code: GAB
- NOC: Comité Olympique Gabonais

in Seoul
- Competitors: 2 in 2 sports
- Flag bearer: Gisèle Ongollo
- Medals: Gold 0 Silver 0 Bronze 0 Total 0

Summer Olympics appearances (overview)
- 1972; 1976–1980; 1984; 1988; 1992; 1996; 2000; 2004; 2008; 2012; 2016; 2020; 2024

Gabon competed at the 1988 Summer Olympics in Seoul, South Korea.

== Competitors ==
The following is the list of number of competitors in the Games.

Sport	Men	Women	Total
Athletics	0	1	1
Boxing	1	–	1
Total	1	1	2

== Athletics ==
Women
Track & road events

Athlete	Event	Heat		Quarterfinal		Semifinal		Final	
Athlete	Event	Result	Rank	Result	Rank	Result	Rank	Result	Rank
Gisèle Ongollo	100 m	11.85	6	did not advance					

== Boxing ==
Men

Athlete	Event	1 Round	2 Round	3 Round	Quarterfinals	Semifinals	Final	
Athlete	Event	Opposition Result	Opposition Result	Opposition Result	Opposition Result	Opposition Result	Opposition Result	Rank
Serge Bouemba	Featherweight	BYE	Lahia (INA); W 4-1	Liu (CHN); L 0-5	did not advance			
