= Gabon at the 1984 Summer Olympics =

- IOC code: GAB
- NOC: Comité Olympique Gabonais

in Los Angeles
- Competitors: 4 in 2 sports
- Flag bearer: Odette Mistoul
- Medals: Gold 0 Silver 0 Bronze 0 Total 0

Summer Olympics appearances (overview)
- 1972; 1976–1980; 1984; 1988; 1992; 1996; 2000; 2004; 2008; 2012; 2016; 2020; 2024

Gabon competed at the 1984 Summer Olympics in Los Angeles, United States. The nation returned to the Olympic Games after boycotting both the 1976 and 1980 Games.

== Athletics ==
Women
Track & road events

Athlete	Event	Heat		Quarterfinal		Semifinal		Final	
Athlete	Event	Result	Rank	Result	Rank	Result	Rank	Result	Rank
Gisele Ongollo	100 m	12.40	8	did not advance					

Field events

Athlete	Event	Qualification		Final	
Athlete	Event	Distance	Position	Distance	Position
Odette Mistoul	Shot put	14.59	13	did not advance	

== Boxing ==
Men

Athlete	Event	1 Round	2 Round	3 Round	Quarterfinals	Semifinals	Final	
Athlete	Event	Opposition Result	Opposition Result	Opposition Result	Opposition Result	Opposition Result	Opposition Result	Rank
Dieudonne Mzatsi	Featherweight	Steven Frank (GUY); W 5-0	Charles Lubulwa (UGA); L 0-5	did not advance				
Desire Ollo	Lightweight	BYE	Alex Dickson (GBR); L 0-5	did not advance				
