= Gabon at the 2016 Summer Olympics =

- IOC code: GAB
- NOC: Comité Olympique Gabonais

in Rio de Janeiro
- Competitors: 6 in 4 sports
- Flag bearer: Anthony Obame
- Medals: Gold 0 Silver 0 Bronze 0 Total 0

Summer Olympics appearances (overview)
- 1972; 1976–1980; 1984; 1988; 1992; 1996; 2000; 2004; 2008; 2012; 2016; 2020; 2024

Gabon competed at the 2016 Summer Olympics in Rio de Janeiro, Brazil, from 5 to 21 August 2016. This was the nation's tenth appearance at the Olympics.

Gabon Olympic Committee (French: Comité Olympique Gabonais) sent a total of six athletes, four men and two women, to compete in four different sports at these Games. The nation's roster was relatively smaller by nearly three quarters of its size from London 2012, where Gabon registered a team of 26 athletes. Among the sports represented by the athletes, Gabon made its Olympic debut in swimming.

Among the Gabonese athletes on the team were sprinters Wilfried Bingangoye and Ruddy Zang Milama, and taekwondo fighter Anthony Obame, who established history as the nation's first ever Olympic medalist, earning the silver in the men's heavyweight category (+80 kg) four years earlier. The most successful athlete of the Games, Obame led the team as Gabon's first male flag bearer in the opening ceremony since 1996.

Gabon, however, left Rio de Janeiro without a single Olympic medal, failing to reproduce it from the previous Games. Silver medalist Anthony Obame was eliminated by Mahama Cho of Great Britain in taekwondo, failing to achieve his successful performance from his appearance in the 2012 Summer Olympics.

== Athletics (track and field) ==
Gabonese athletes have so far achieved qualifying standards in the following athletics events (up to a maximum of 3 athletes in each event):

Key

- Note–Ranks given for track events are within the athlete's heat only
- Q = Qualified for the next round
- q = Qualified for the next round as a fastest loser or, in field events, by position without achieving the qualifying target
- NR = National record
- N/A = Round not applicable for the event
- Bye = Athlete not required to compete in round

Track & road events

Athlete	Event	Heat		Quarterfinal		Semifinal		Final	
Athlete	Event	Result	Rank	Result	Rank	Result	Rank	Result	Rank
Wilfried Bingangoye	Men's 100 m	11.03	5	Did not advance					
Ruddy Zang Milama	Women's 100 m	Bye		11.67	7	Did not advance			

== Judo ==
Gabon has qualified two judokas for each of the following weight classes at the Games. Sarah Myriam Mazouz was ranked among the top 14 eligible judokas for women in the IJF World Ranking List of May 30, 2016, while Paul Kibikai at men's half-middleweight (81 kg) earned a continental quota spot from the African region as Gabon's top-ranked judoka outside of direct qualifying position.

Athlete	Event	Round of 64	Round of 32	Round of 16	Quarterfinals	Semifinals	Repechage	Final / BM	
Athlete	Event	Opposition Result	Opposition Result	Opposition Result	Opposition Result	Opposition Result	Opposition Result	Opposition Result	Rank
Paul Kibikai	Men's −81 kg	Bye	Al-Aameri (IRQ); W 000–000 S	Nagase (JPN); L 000–100	Did not advance				
Sarah Myriam Mazouz	Women's −78 kg	—	Bye	Powell (GBR); L 000–100	Did not advance				

== Swimming ==
Gabon has received a Universality invitation from FINA to send a male swimmer for the first time to the Olympics.

Athlete	Event	Heat		Semifinal		Final	
Athlete	Event	Time	Rank	Time	Rank	Time	Rank
Maël Ambonguilat	Men's 50 m freestyle	27.21	75	Did not advance			

== Taekwondo ==
Gabon entered one athlete into the taekwondo competition at the Olympics. 2012 Olympic silver medalist Anthony Obame qualified automatically for the men's heavyweight category (+80 kg) by finishing in the top 6 WTF Olympic rankings.

Athlete	Event	Round of 16	Quarterfinals	Semifinals	Repechage	Final / BM	
Athlete	Event	Opposition Result	Opposition Result	Opposition Result	Opposition Result	Opposition Result	Rank
Anthony Obame	Men's +80 kg	Cho (GBR); L 6–12	Did not advance				
