= Gabon at the 1996 Summer Olympics =

- IOC code: GAB
- NOC: Comité Olympique Gabonais

in Atlanta
- Competitors: 7 in 3 sports
- Flag bearer: Roger Oyembo
- Medals: Gold 0 Silver 0 Bronze 0 Total 0

Summer Olympics appearances (overview)
- 1972; 1976–1980; 1984; 1988; 1992; 1996; 2000; 2004; 2008; 2012; 2016; 2020; 2024

Gabon competed at the 1996 Summer Olympics in Atlanta, United States.

== Competitors ==
The following is the list of number of competitors in the Games.

Sport	Men	Women	Total
Athletics	4	0	4
Boxing	2	–	2
Judo	0	1	1
Total	6	1	7

== Athletics ==
Men
Track and road events

Athletes	Events	Heat Round 1		Heat Round 2		Semifinal		Final	
Athletes	Events	Time	Rank	Time	Rank	Time	Rank	Time	Rank
Patrick Mocci-Raoumbé	100 m	10.87	86	did not advance					
Antoine Boussombo	200 m	21.06	56	did not advance					
Patrick Mocci-Raoumbé; Antoine Boussombo; Charles Tayot; Eric Ebang Zué	4 × 100 m	39.97	21	N/A		did not advance			

== Boxing ==
Men

Athlete	Event	Round of 32	Round of 16	Quarterfinal	Semifinal	Final
Athlete	Event	Opposition Result	Opposition Result	Opposition Result	Opposition Result	Opposition Result
Guy-Elie Boulingui	Flyweight	Ballo (INA); L 6-2	Did not advance			
Julio Mboumba	Lightweight	Doroftei (ROM); L (RSC-2)	Did not advance			

== Judo ==
Women

Athlete	Event	Round of 32	Round of 16	Quarterfinals	Semifinals	Repechage 1	Repechage 2	Repechage 3	Final / BM	
Athlete	Event	Opposition Result	Opposition Result	Opposition Result	Opposition Result	Opposition Result	Opposition Result	Opposition Result	Opposition Result	Rank
Mélanie Engoang	−66 kg	BYE	Aneta Szczepańska (POL); L 0000–1000	did not advance		BYE	Rowena Sweatman (GBR); L 0000–1000	did not advance		9
