= Gabon at the 2024 Summer Olympics =

- IOC code: GAB
- NOC: Comité Olympique Gabonais

in Paris, France 26 July 2024 – 11 August 2024
- Competitors: 5 (2 men and 3 women) in 4 sports
- Flag bearers (opening): Wissy Frank Hoye Yenda Moukoula & Noëlie Lacour
- Flag bearers (closing): Wissy Frank Hoye Yenda Moukoula & Noëlie Lacour
- Medals: Gold 0 Silver 0 Bronze 0 Total 0

Summer Olympics appearances (overview)
- 1972; 1976–1980; 1984; 1988; 1992; 1996; 2000; 2004; 2008; 2012; 2016; 2020; 2024

Gabon competed at the 2024 Summer Olympics in Paris from 26 July to 11 August 2024. It was the nation's twelfth appearance since its debut in 1972, with two exceptions: a Congolese-led boycott in 1976, and the US-led boycott in 1980.

Gabon failed to earn its Olympic medal for the third consecutive time after its back-to-back poor performances in 2016 and in 2020.

== Competitors ==
The following is the list of number of competitors in the Games.

Sport	Men	Women	Total
Athletics	1	0	1
Judo	0	1	1
Swimming	1	1	2
Taekwondo	0	1	1
Total	2	3	5

== Athletics ==
Gabon sent one sprinter to compete at the 2024 Summer Olympics.

Key

- Note–Ranks given for track events are within the athlete's heat only
- Q = Qualified for the next round
- q = Qualified for the next round as a fastest loser or, in field events, by position without achieving the qualifying target
- NR = National record
- N/A = Round not applicable for the event
- Bye = Athlete not required to compete in round

Track events

Athlete	Event	Preliminary		Heat		Semifinal		Final	
Athlete	Event	Result	Rank	Result	Rank	Result	Rank	Result	Rank
Wissy Frank Hoye Yenda Moukoula	Men's 100 m	10.59	3	Did not advance					

== Judo ==
Gabon qualified one judoka for the following weight class at the Games. Virginia Aymard (women's extra-lightweight, 48 kg) got qualified via continental quota based on Olympic point rankings.

Athlete	Event	Round of 32	Round of 16	Quarterfinals	Semifinals	Repechage	Final / BM	
Athlete	Event	Opposition Result	Opposition Result	Opposition Result	Opposition Result	Opposition Result	Opposition Result	Rank
Virginia Aymard	Women's −48 kg	Narváez (PAR); L 00–11	Did not advance					

== Swimming ==
Gabon sent two swimmers to compete at the 2024 Paris Olympics.

Athlete	Event	Heat		Semifinal		Final	
Athlete	Event	Time	Rank	Time	Rank	Time	Rank
Adam Girard de Langlade Mpali	Men's 50 m freestyle	28.47	68	Did not advance			
Noélie Annette Lacour	Women's 50 m freestyle	27.68	46	Did not advance			

== Taekwondo ==
Gabon qualified one taekwondo practitioner to compete at the games. Emmanuella Atora qualified for Paris 2024, following the triumph of her unexpected victory in the semifinal rounds of the women's below 57 kg class at the 2024 African Qualification Tournament in Dakar, Senegal.

Athlete	Event	Qualification	Round of 16	Quarterfinals	Semifinals	Repechage	Final / BM	
Athlete	Event	Opposition Result	Opposition Result	Opposition Result	Opposition Result	Opposition Result	Opposition Result	Rank
Emmanuella Atora	Women's −57 kg	—N/a	Luo (CHN); L 0–2	Did not advance				
