= Gabon at the 2022 World Aquatics Championships =

- Flag of Gabon
- FINA code: GAB
- National federation: Fédération Gabonaise de Natation

in Budapest, Hungary
- Competitors: 1 in 1 sport
- Medals: Gold 0 Silver 0 Bronze 0 Total 0

World Aquatics Championships appearances
- 2015; 2017; 2019; 2022; 2023; 2024

Gabon competed at the 2022 World Aquatics Championships in Budapest, Hungary from 18 June to 3 July.

== Swimming ==
Gabonese swimmers have achieved qualifying standards in the following events.

Athlete	Event	Heat		Semifinal		Final	
Athlete	Event	Time	Rank	Time	Rank	Time	Rank
Adam Mpali	Men's 50 m freestyle	27.93	87	did not advance			
