= Gabon at the 2015 World Aquatics Championships =

- Flag of Gabon
- FINA code: GAB
- National federation: Fédération Gabonaise de Natation

in Kazan, Russia
- Competitors: 1 in 1 sport
- Medals: Gold 0 Silver 0 Bronze 0 Total 0

World Aquatics Championships appearances
- 2015; 2017; 2019; 2022; 2023; 2024

Gabon competed at the 2015 World Aquatics Championships in Kazan, Russia from 24 July to 9 August 2015.

== Swimming ==
Gabonese swimmers have achieved qualifying standards in the following events (up to a maximum of 2 swimmers in each event at the A-standard entry time, and 1 at the B-standard):

Men

Athlete	Event	Heat		Semifinal		Final	
Athlete	Event	Time	Rank	Time	Rank	Time	Rank
Maël Ambonguilat	50 m freestyle	29.25	110	did not advance			
Maël Ambonguilat	50 m butterfly	35.30	80	did not advance			
