= Gabon at the 1972 Summer Olympics =

- IOC code: GAB
- NOC: Comité Olympique Gabonais

in Munich
- Competitors: 1 (man) in 1 sport
- Flag bearer: Matias Moussobou
- Medals: Gold 0 Silver 0 Bronze 0 Total 0

Summer Olympics appearances (overview)
- 1972; 1976–1980; 1984; 1988; 1992; 1996; 2000; 2004; 2008; 2012; 2016; 2020; 2024

Gabon competed in the Olympic Games for the first time at the 1972 Summer Olympics in Munich, West Germany from August 26, 1972 to September 11, 1972. They sent one athlete, Joseph Mbouroukounda, who competed in boxing in the Men's Featherweight category.

== Boxing ==
Men

| Athlete | Event | 1 Round | 2 Round | 3 Round | Quarterfinals | Semifinals | Final | |
| Athlete | Event | Opposition Result | Opposition Result | Opposition Result | Opposition Result | Opposition Result | Opposition Result | Rank |
|---|---|---|---|---|---|---|---|---|
| Joseph Mbourokounda | Featherweight | Rudolf Vogel (SUI); L 2-3 | did not advance | | | | | |
