= Gabon at the 2009 World Championships in Athletics =

- WA code: GAB

in Berlin
- Competitors: 2 (1 man, 1 woman)
- Medals: Gold 0 Silver 0 Bronze 0 Total 0

World Championships in Athletics appearances
- 1983; 1987; 1991; 1993; 1995; 1997; 1999; 2001; 2003; 2005; 2007; 2009; 2011; 2013; 2015–2017; 2019; 2022; 2023

Gabon competes at the 2009 World Championships in Athletics from 15–23 August in Berlin.

== Team selection ==
Track and road events

| Event | Athletes | |
| Event | Men | Women |
|---|---|---|
| 100 metres | Wilfried Bingangoye | Ruddy Zang Milama |

== Results ==
=== Men ===
Track and road events

| Event | Athletes | Heats | | Quarterfinal | | Semifinal | | Final | |
| Event | Athletes | Result | Rank | Result | Rank | Result | Rank | Result | Rank |
|---|---|---|---|---|---|---|---|---|---|
| 100 m | Wilfried Bingangoye | 10.62 | 60 | did not advance | | | | | |

=== Women ===
Track and road events

| Event | Athletes | Heats | | Quarterfinal | | Semifinal | | Final | |
| Event | Athletes | Result | Rank | Result | Rank | Result | Rank | Result | Rank |
|---|---|---|---|---|---|---|---|---|---|
| 100 m | Ruddy Zang Milama | 11.74 | 34 | did not advance | | | | | |
