= Gabon at the 2013 World Championships in Athletics =

- WA code: GAB

in Moscow
- Competitors: 2
- Medals: Gold 0 Silver 0 Bronze 0 Total 0

World Championships in Athletics appearances
- 1983; 1987; 1991; 1993; 1995; 1997; 1999; 2001; 2003; 2005; 2007; 2009; 2011; 2013; 2015–2017; 2019; 2022; 2023; 2025

Gabon competed at the 2013 World Championships in Athletics in Moscow, Russia, from 10–18 August 2013. A team of two athletes was announced to represent the country in the event.

== Results ==
(q – qualified, NM – no mark, SB – season best)

=== Men ===
| Athlete | Event | Preliminaries | | Heats | | Semifinals | | Final | |
| Athlete | Event | Time | Rank | Time | Rank | Time | Rank | Time | Rank |
|---|---|---|---|---|---|---|---|---|---|
| Gauthier Okawe | 100 metres | 11.83 | 29 | did not advance | | | | | |
