= Roman Kuznetsov =

Russian taekwondo practitioner

Personal information
- Nationality: Russian
- Born: August 14, 1989

Sport
- Country: Russia
- Sport: Taekwondo
- Event: +87 kg (heavyweight)
Medal record
Representing Russia
Men's taekwondo
World Championships
Bronze medal – third place	2017 Muju	+87 kg
Grand Prix
Gold medal – first place	2017 Moscow	+80 kg
Silver medal – second place	2017 Rabat	+80 kg
Bronze medal – third place	2016 Baku	+80 kg
European Championships
Silver medal – second place	2018 Kazan	+87 kg
Silver medal – second place	2016 Montreaux	+87 kg
Summer Universiade
Gold medal – first place	2009 Belgrad	+84 kg

Roman Vladimirovich Kuznetsov (Russian: Роман Владимирович Кузнецов; born 14 August 1989), is a Russian taekwondo athlete. He won the bronze medal at the 2017 World Taekwondo Championships in the heavyweight category. He also won a gold medal at the Moscow series of the 2017 World Taekwondo Grand Prix, defeating Korean Kyo-Don In.
