= Odette Mistoul =

Gabonese shot putter

Medal record

Women's athletics

Representing Gabon

African Championships
Gold medal – first place	1979 Dakar	Shot put
Gold medal – first place	1982 Cairo	Shot put
Gold medal – first place	1984 Raba	Shot put
Bronze medal – third place	1985 Cairo	Shot put

Odette Mistoul (married Kingbou; born 22 February 1959) is a Gabonese former track and field athlete who competed in the shot put. She represented her country at the 1984 Los Angeles Olympics, placing 13th in the final. She was also her nation's Olympic flag bearer that year. She was the first woman to represent Gabon at the Olympics. She won the first three gold medals in women's shot put at the African Championships in Athletics from 1979 to 1984.

She participated at the inaugural 1983 World Championships in Athletics and was a finalist at the 1979 IAAF World Cup. In other competitions, she was twice winner at the Central African Athletics Championships and took bronze at the 1985 African Championships in Athletics.

Her personal bests of 15.51 m (50 ft 10 1/2 in) for the shot put and 36.31 m (119 ft 1 1/2 in) for the discus throw remain the Gabonese records for the disciplines.

After retirement from athletics, she remained involved in the sport and stood as a candidate for the women's committee for the International Association of Athletics Federations.

== International competitions ==
Year	Competition	Venue	Position	Event	Notes
1978	Central African Championships	Libreville, Gabon	1st	Shot put	12.44 m
1979	African Championships	Dakar, Senegal	1st	Shot put	13.45 m CR
1979	IAAF World Cup	Montreal, Canada	8th	Shot put	13.71 m
1980	Central African Championships	Brazzaville, Congo	1st	Shot put	13.80 m
1982	African Championships	Cairo, Egypt	1st	Shot put	14.21 m CR
1983	World Championships	Helsinki, Finland	18th (q)	Shot put	14.23 m
1984	African Championships	Rabat, Morocco	1st	Shot put	15.51 m CR
1984	Olympic Games	Los Angeles, United States	13th	Shot put	14.59 m
1985	African Championships	Cairo, Egypt	3rd	Shot put	14.54 m

== See also ==
- List of champions of the African Championships in Athletics
- Gabon at the 1984 Summer Olympics

Olympic Games
Preceded by Matias Moussobou	Flagbearer for Gabon; 1984 Los Angeles	Succeeded by Gisèle Ongollo
