= Taekwondo at the 2012 Summer Olympics – Men's +80 kg =

Taekwondo competition

Men's +80 kg at the Games of the XXX Olympiad
- Venue: ExCeL Exhibition Centre, London, England
- Date: 11 August
- Competitors: 16 from 16 nations

Medalists
1st place, gold medalist(s)		Carlo Molfetta	Italy
2nd place, silver medalist(s)		Anthony Obame	Gabon
3rd place, bronze medalist(s)		Robelis Despaigne	Cuba
3rd place, bronze medalist(s)		Liu Xiaobo	China

The men's +80 kg competition at the 2012 Summer Olympics was held on 11 August, at the ExCeL Exhibition Centre.

== Competition format ==
The main bracket consisted of a single elimination tournament, culminating in the gold medal match. Two bronze medals were awarded at the Taekwondo competitions. A repechage was used to determine the bronze medal winners. Every competitor who lost to one of the two finalists competed in the repechage, another single-elimination competition. Each semifinal loser faced the last remaining repechage competitor from the opposite half of the bracket in a bronze medal match.

== Schedule ==
All times are British Summer Time (UTC+1)

Date	Time	Round
Saturday, 11 August 2012	09:15; 15:15; 17:17; 22:30	Preliminary Round; Quarterfinals; Semifinals; Final

== Results ==
On 13 July 2012 the World Taekwondo Federation released the provisional draw which included the top eight seeds for the competition. The remainder of the qualified athletes were randomly drawn on 6 August 2012.

=== Main Bracket ===
Preliminary round
1	Cha Dong-Min (KOR)	9
Ivan Konrad Trajkovic (SLO)	4
Alexandros Nikolaidis (GRE)	3
8	Bahri Tanrıkulu (TUR)	7
5	Anthony Obame (GAB)	9
Kaino Thomsen-Fuataga (SAM)	2
Chika Yagazie Chukwumerije (NGR)	0
4	Robelis Despaigne (CUB)	1
3	Carlo Molfetta (ITA)	7
Alisher Gulov (TJK)	3
Kenneth Edwards (JAM)	4
6	Liu Xiaobo (CHN)	6
7	Akmal Irgashev (UZB)	4
Daba Modibo Keita (MLI)	13
Gadzhi Umarov (RUS)	3
2	François Coulombe-Fortier (CAN)	7

Quarterfinals
1	Cha Dong-Min (KOR)	1
8	Bahri Tanrıkulu (TUR)	4
5	Anthony Obame (GAB)	7 (SUD)
4	Robelis Despaigne (CUB)	6
3	Carlo Molfetta (ITA)	6 (SUD)
6	Liu Xiaobo (CHN)	5
Daba Modibo Keita (MLI)	11
2	François Coulombe-Fortier (CAN)	6

Semifinals
8	Bahri Tanrıkulu (TUR)	2
5	Anthony Obame (GAB)	3
3	Carlo Molfetta (ITA)	6
Daba Modibo Keita (MLI)	4

Gold medal match
5	Anthony Obame (GAB)	9
3	Carlo Molfetta (ITA)	9 (SUP)

=== Repechage ===
Preliminary Round
