= Leonardo Basile =

Italian taekwondo practitioner

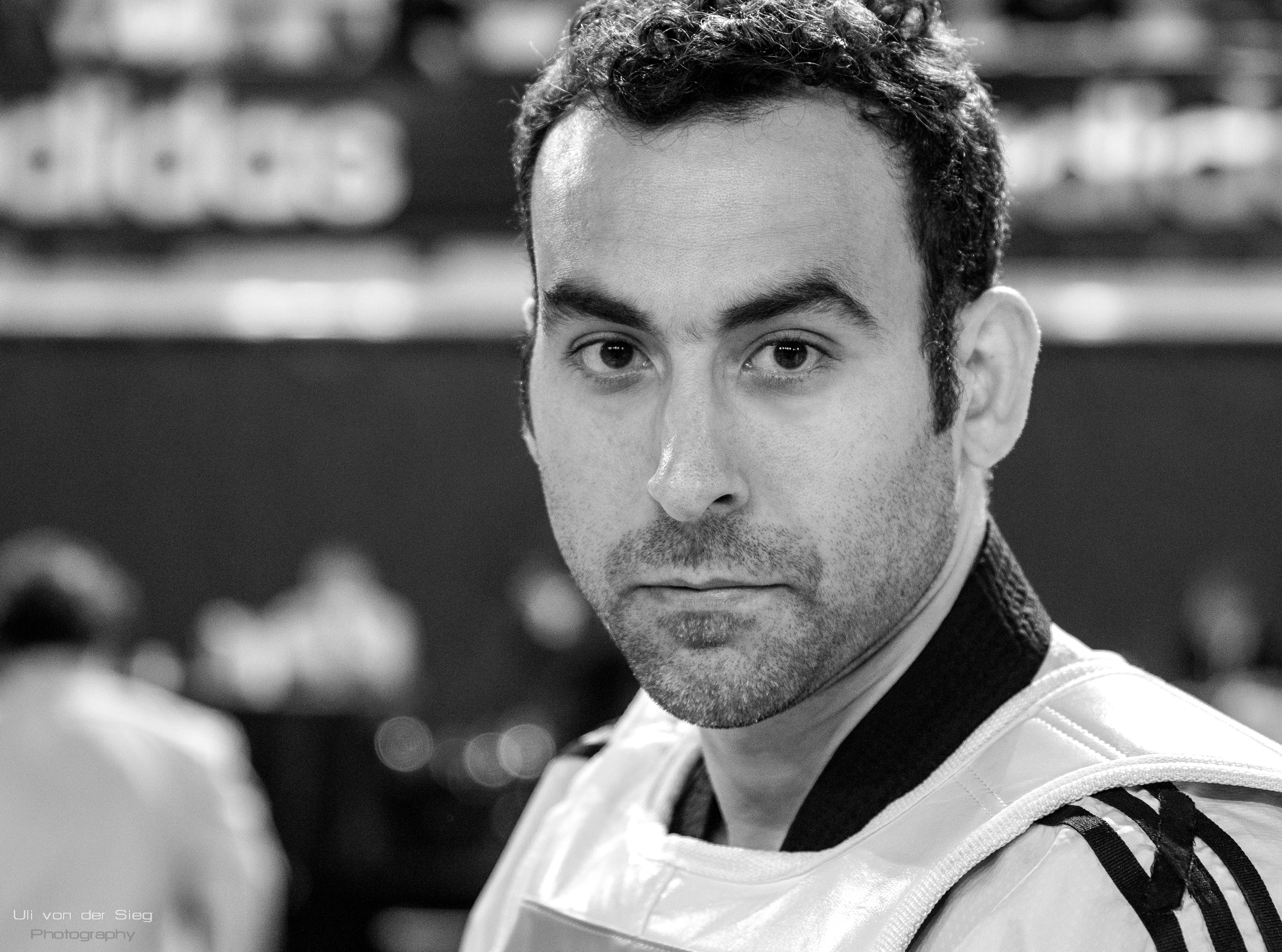

Personal information
- Nationality: Italy
- Born: 12 May 1983 (age 43) Naples, Italy
- Height: 1.84 m (6 ft 1/2 in)
- Weight: 95 kg (209 lb)

Sport
- Sport: Taekwondo
- Event: +80 kg
- Club: Centro Sportivo Esercito
- Coached by: Yoon Soon-Cheul
Medal record
Men's taekwondo
Representing Italy
Universiade
Silver medal – second place	2007 Bangkok	+84 kg
Bronze medal – third place	2005 İzmir	+84 kg
World Championships
Bronze medal – third place	2005 Madrid	+84 kg
European Championships
Bronze medal – third place	2014 Baku	+87 kg
Gold medal – first place	2012 Manchester	+87 kg
Bronze medal – third place	2006 Bonn	+84 kg
Bronze medal – third place	2008 Rome	+84 kg
Mediterranean Games
Bronze medal – third place	2013 Mersin	+80 kg

Leonardo Basile (born 12 May 1983) is an Italian taekwondo practitioner. In 2005, Basile had won two bronze medals for the over-84 kg class at the World Taekwondo Championships in Madrid, Spain, and at the Summer Universiade in İzmir, Turkey. He also captured a silver medal in the same division at the 2007 Summer Universiade in Bangkok, Thailand, and eventually defeated Slovenia's Ivan Trajkovic for the gold at the 2012 European Taekwondo Championships in Manchester, United Kingdom. Basile is a member of the taekwondo team for Centro Sportivo Esercito, and is coached and trained by Yoon Soon-Cheul.

Basile qualified for the men's heavyweight division (+80 kg) at the 2008 Summer Olympics in Beijing, after placing second from the European Qualification Tournament in Istanbul, Turkey. He lost the preliminary round of sixteen match to Cuba's Ángel Matos, with a score of 1–3.
