= Kaino Thomsen =

Samoan taekwondo practitioner

Kaino Thomsen-Fuataga
Personal information
- Born: 12 May 1991 (age 35) Faga'alu, American Samoa
- Height: 1.80 m (5 ft 11 in) (2012)
- Weight: 90 kg (200 lb) (2012)

Sport
- Country: Samoa
- Sport: Taekwondo
- Event: +80 kg
Medal record
Men's taekwondo
Representing Samoa
Pacific Games
Gold medal – first place	2011 Nouméa	-87 kg
Silver medal – second place	2019 Apia	+87 kg
- Updated on 14 August 2012

Kaino Thomsen-Fuataga (born 12 May 1991) is a Samoan sportsman who has represented his country in taekwondo and rugby union. He competed in the +80 kg event at the 2012 Summer Olympics; he was defeated by Anthony Obame in the preliminary round and was eliminated by Robelis Despaigne in the repechage contest.

== Rugby union ==
Kaino Thomsen
- Occupation: Rugby union player

Rugby union career
- Position: Centre
- Current team: Vaimoso Rugby Club
- Correct as of 20 May 2014
Senior career
Years	Team	Apps	(Points)
2013–present	Vaimoso Rugby Club	(?)	
- Correct as of 24 May 2014
International career
Years	Team	Apps	(Points)
2013–present	Samoa A	?	((?))
- Correct as of 24 ay 2014

In December 2012, just four months after London 2012, Thomsen announced he had quit taekwondo due to false promises, empty words and the lack of money. He said he wanted to re-purpose his talents at rugby union after representing Manu Samoa in age grade rugby. In February 2013, he was part of the Samoa A squad in the Pacific Rugby Cup, in which Samoa A came runners up to Fiji Warriors. Just two years after London 2012, Thomsen was then named in the Samoan national rugby union team for their 2014 mid-year tests and 2014 IRB Pacific Nations Cup.

In a return to taekwondo for the Pacific Games held in Apia in 2019, Thomsen won a silver medal in a closely contested bout against Australia's Alan Salek in the +87 kg division. He had won a gold medal at the games eight years earlier in Nouméa.
