= Anthony Obame =

Gabonese taekwondo practitioner

Personal information
- Full name: Anthony Obame Mylann
- Born: 10 September 1988 (age 37) Libreville, Gabon
- Height: 188 cm (6 ft 2 in)

Sport
- Country: Gabon
- Sport: Taekwondo
- Event: Heavyweight (+87 kg)
- Coached by: Juan Antonio Ramos
Medal record
Men's taekwondo
Representing Gabon
Olympic Games
Silver medal – second place	2012 London	+80 kg
World Championships
Gold medal – first place	2013 Puebla	+87 kg
Bronze medal – third place	2015 Chelyabinsk	+87 kg
Bronze medal – third place	2017 Muju	+87 kg
Grand Prix
Gold medal – first place	2014 Suzhou	+80 kg
Silver medal – second place	2018 Taoyuan	+80 kg
Bronze medal – third place	2013 Manchester	+80 kg
Bronze medal – third place	2018 Moscow	+80 kg
African Games
Silver medal – second place	2011 Maputo	−87 kg
Silver medal – second place	2015 Brazzaville	+87 kg
Bronze medal – third place	2019 Rabat	+87 kg
Bronze medal – third place	2023 Accra	+87 kg

Anthony Obame Mylann (born 10 September 1988 in Libreville, Gabon) is a taekwondo practitioner who represented Gabon at the 2012, 2016 and 2020 Summer Olympics.

== Biography ==
Obame has been coached by former two-time world champion Juan Antonio Ramos.

He won the silver medal in the men's 80+ kg category at the 2012 Olympic Games, becoming the first Gabonese athlete to win a medal at the Olympics.

Obame defeated Kaino Thomsen and Bahri Tanrikulu en route to the gold medal match, which he lost to Carlo Molfetta of Italy. Obame led in the match, but lost on a judges' decision after the match ended in a tie. Obame said he was disappointed because of what he called a "youthful error."

Anthony Obame was greeted by thousands of supporters upon his return to Libreville. Obame said he felt "immense pride and joy" in having won the nation's first Olympic medal.

He represented Gabon at the 2016 Summer Olympics in +80 kg division. He was defeated by Mahama Cho of Great Britain in the first round. He was the flag bearer for Gabon in the Parade of Nations.

Obame competed in the men's +80 kg class at the 2020 Summer Olympics.

Olympic Games
Preceded by Ruddy Zang Milama	Flagbearer for Gabon; Rio de Janeiro 2016; Tokyo 2020 with Aya Girard de Langlade Mpali	Succeeded by Wissy Frank Hoye Yenda Moukoula; Noelie Annette Lacour
