= Dmitriy Shokin =

Uzbekistani taekwondo practitioner

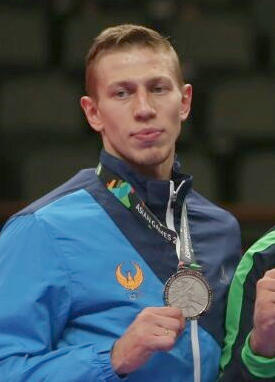
- Shokin at the 2018 Asian Games

Personal information
- Nationality: Uzbekistani
- Born: 30 May 1992 (age 34) Tashkent, Uzbekistan
- Height: 193 cm (6 ft 4 in)

Sport
- Sport: Taekwondo
- Coached by: Fahriddin Umarov (club); Akmal Irgashev (national)
Medal record
Representing Uzbekistan
World Championships
| Gold medal – first place | 2015 Chelyabinsk | +87 kg |
Asian Games
| Silver medal – second place | 2018 Incheon | +87 kg |
| Silver medal – second place | 2018 Jakarta | +80 kg |
Asian Championships
| Gold medal – first place | 2014 Tashkent | +87 kg |
| Gold medal – first place | 2016 Pasay | +87 kg |
| Bronze medal – third place | 2018 Ho Chi Minh City | +87 kg |
Summer Universiade
| Gold medal – first place | 2015 Gwangju | +87 kg |

Dmitriy Aleksandrovich Shokin (born 30 May 1992) is an Uzbekistani heavyweight taekwondo competitor. He won the world championships in 2015 and the Asian championships in 2014 and 2016. Shokin placed fifth at the 2016 Olympics and second at the 2014 and 2018 Asian Games.

Shokin took up taekwondo aged seven. He has a degree in tourism from the Tashkent State University of Economics.
