= Gisèle Ongollo =

Gabonese sprinter (born 1966)

Personal information
- Nationality: Gabonese
- Born: 20 February 1966 (age 60) Doumai, Gabon
- Height: 160 cm (5 ft 3 in)
- Weight: 60 kg (132 lb)

Sport
- Sport: Sprinting
- Event: 100 metres

Gisèle Pascale Simangoye Ongollo (born 20 February 1966) is a Gabonese former sprinter. She competed in the 100 metres at the 1984 Summer Olympics and the 1988 Summer Olympics. During her career, she was considered the best athlete in Gabon. She won three gold medals at the 1987 Central African Games and served as flagbearer for Gabon at the 1988 Olympics. She also studied in Morocco and while there, won the Moroccan championship in the 60 metres.

== Biography ==
Ongollo was born on 20 February 1966 in Doumai, Gabon. She began competing in athletics at age 10 in 1976. She quickly attracted the attention of coaches and by 1979 she was selected for the national team for the first time, at the Ivorian Games. Competing as a sprinter, she ran the 100 metres in a time of 13.1 seconds. Over the next years she improved her times in the 100 and 200 metres and set repeated national records in both events.

Ongollo was described as the "Queen of the Gabonese tracks" and was considered the greatest athlete in her nation during her career. She competed at the 1984 Summer Olympics in Los Angeles, becoming, along with Odette Mistoul, one of the first two women to represent Gabon at the Olympics. Competing in the 100 metres, she recorded a time of 12.4 seconds and failed to advance from her heat. Three years later, at the Central African Games, she won a total of three gold medals – in the 100m, 200m and 4 × 100 metres relay. She also competed at the 1987 World Championships in Athletics, reaching the quarterfinals. Around that time, she studied in Morocco at the Faculty of Law. She competed in athletics while in Morocco, winning the national championship in the 60 metres in 1988. That year, she recorded a time of 24.4 seconds in the 200 metres which was the Gabonese record.

Ongollo competed at the 1988 Summer Olympics in Seoul. According to Femes gabonaises, she "valiantly defended the national colours" and "honored Gabon" with her performance there, breaking the national record in the 100m. She was one of only two competitors for Gabon at the 1988 Olympics, and the only woman. In the 100m, she failed to advance from her heat with a time of 11.85, but she still set the national record in that event. She served as the flagbearer for Gabon at the 1988 opening Olympic ceremony. Later that year, Ongollo set her personal best in the 100m with a time of 11.5 seconds. She later competed at the 1991 World Championships in Athletics.

After her career, Ongollo served as the Vice-President of the Executive Committee of the African Olympic Athletes Association. By 2022, she was the director of human resources for the General Directorate of Public Accounting and the Treasury of Gabon.

Olympic Games
Preceded by Odette Mistoul	Flagbearer for Gabon; Seoul 1988	Succeeded by Unknown
