= Sajjad Mardani =

Iranian taekwondo practitioner

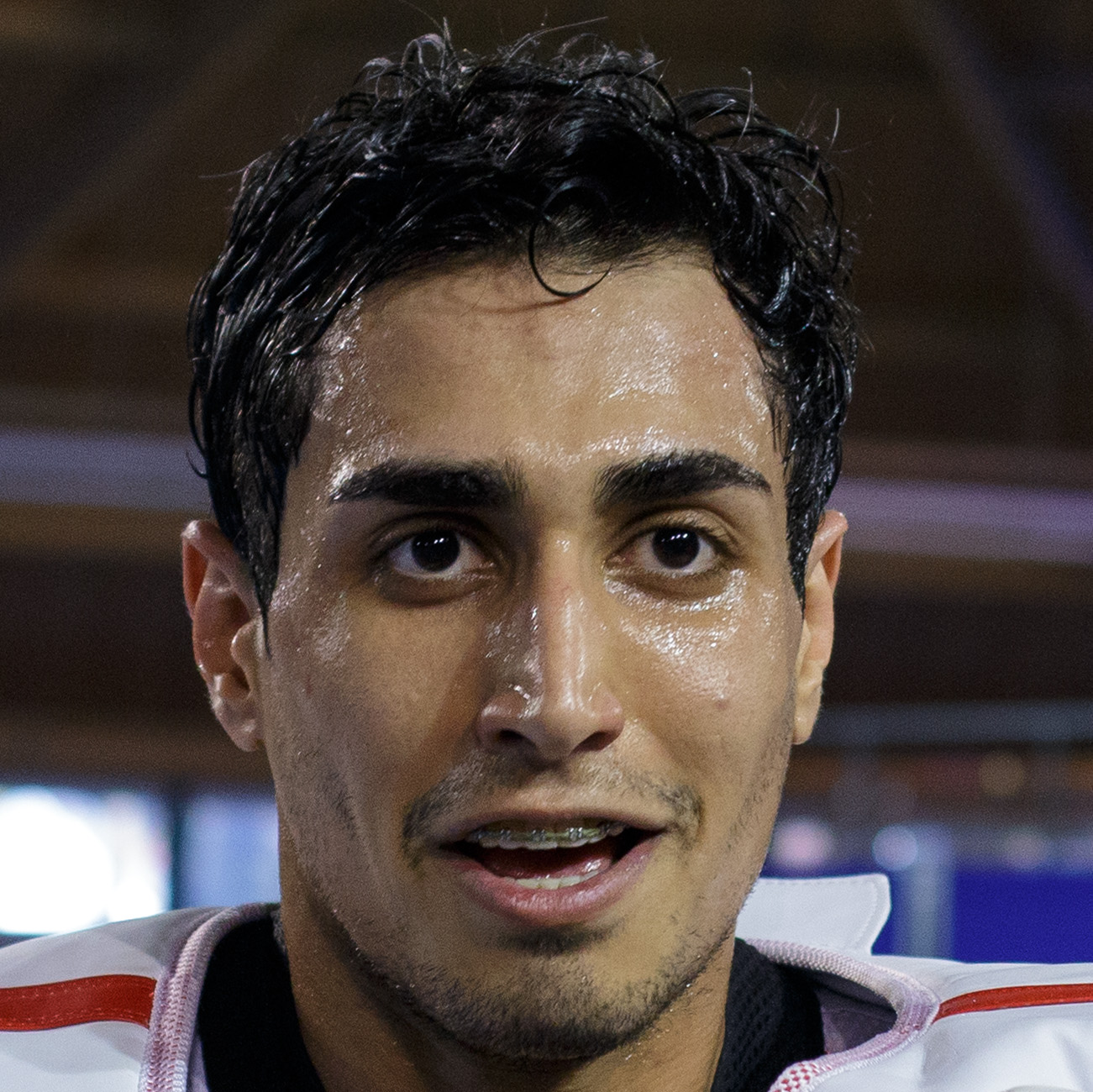
- Mardani in 2014

Personal information
- Nationality: Iranian
- Born: 1 July 1988 (age 37)
- Height: 1.98 m (6 ft 6 in)
- Weight: 96 kg (212 lb)

Sport
- Sport: Taekwondo
Medal record
Representing Iran
Men's taekwondo
Event	1st	2nd	3rd
World Championships	-	1	1
Asian Championships	1	-	1
World Grand Prix	2	2	8
World Grand Slam	1	-	1
World Championships
Silver medal – second place	2013 Puebla	+87 kg
Bronze medal – third place	2022 Guadalajara	+87 kg
Asian Championships
Gold medal – first place	2021 Beirut	+87 kg
Bronze medal – third place	2012 Ho Chi Minh City	+87 kg
- Updated on 17 June 2021

Sajjad Mardani (Persian: سجاد مردانی, born 1 July 1988 in Shahrekord, Iran) is an Iranian taekwondo practitioner, he won the silver medal in the men's heavyweight class at the 2013 World Taekwondo Championships held in Puebla, Mexico.

Sajjad Mardani has also been on the world's top 5 (+ 80 kg) taekwondo weights since 2013, always and annually.
