= Marlyse Nsourou =

Gabonese middle-distance runner

Personal information
- Nationality: Gabonese
- Born: 27 February 1987 (age 39)

Sport
- Sport: Middle-distance running
- Event: 800 metres

Marlyse Nsourou (born 27 February 1987) is a Gabonese middle-distance runner. She competed in the women's 800 metres at the 2004 Summer Olympics.
