= Antoine Boussombo =

Gabonese sprinter (born 1968)

Medal record

Men's athletics

Representing Gabon

African Championships
Bronze medal – third place	2000 Algiers	4×100 m

Antoine Boussombo (born 18 May 1968) is a Gabonese sprinter specializing in the 200 metres.

== Career ==
At the 1997 Jeux de la Francophonie he won silver medals in both 100 m and 200 m . He also competed at the World Championships in 1995, 1997 and 1999 as well as two Olympic Games.

Boussombo holds the national records in both 100 m (10.13 seconds) and 200 m (20.49 seconds). Both records were set in 2000. Antoine now lives in Edmonton, Alberta, Canada where he still competes in Masters events. In 2006, he ran the world's 3rd best time in the 35-39 age group on 100 m (10.40) and the world's 4th time on 200 m in 21.38.

He is now a French and Physical Education teacher at École Alexandre-Taché, a local francophone middle and high school in St. Albert, Alberta, Canada.

In the year 2015 he won Developmental Coach of the Year Award by Athletics Alberta and continues to coach athletes who continue to break records and reach new heights.

== Children ==
He has a child named TJ [Tony Jr] Boussombo, who currently attends Harry Ainlay Composite High School 60m: 6.97 PB 100m: 10.81
