= Ivan Trajkovič =

Slovenian taekwondo practitioner

Medal record

Men's taekwondo

Representing Slovenia

World Championships
Bronze medal – third place	2013 Puebla	Heavyweight

European Championships
Silver medal – second place	2012 Manchester	Heavyweight
Bronze medal – third place	2018 Kazan	Middleweight

Ivan Konrad Trajkovič (born 1 September 1991 in Zagreb, Croatia) is a Slovenian taekwondo athlete. He competed at the 2012 Summer Olympics in the +80 kg category where he lost in preliminary round to Cha Dong-Min of South Korea.

He represented Slovenia at the 2020 Summer Olympics in the men's +80 kg event, losing the bronze medal match to another South Korean taekwondo-jin, In Kyo-don.
