= Robelis Despaigne =

Cuban taekwondo practitioner and mixed martial artist (born 1988)

- Born: Robelis Despaigne Sanquet; 9 August 1988 (age 38); Santiago de Cuba, Cuba
- Other names: The Bad Boy
- Height: 6 ft 7 in (2.01 m)
- Weight: 259 lb (117 kg; 18 st 7 lb)
- Division: Heavyweight
- Reach: 86 in (218 cm)
- Style: Taekwondo
- Fighting out of: Orlando, Florida, U.S.
- Rank: 4th degree black belt in Taekwondo
- Years active: 2022–present

Mixed martial arts record
- Total: 9
- Wins: 7
- By knockout: 6
- By decision: 1
- Losses: 2
- By decision: 2

Other information
- Mixed martial arts record from Sherdog

Robelis Despaigne Sanquet (born 9 August 1988) is a Cuban professional mixed martial artist and taekwondo practitioner who is currently signed with the Ultimate Fighting Championship (UFC). Despaigne competed in the Heavyweight division in Karate Combat where he was the Karate Combat Heavyweight Champion. He won the bronze medal in Taekwondo at the 2012 Summer Olympics - Men's for 80 kg.

== Background ==
Robelis Despaigne spent his formative years in Cuba, where he began practicing taekwondo at nine years old. Seven years into his training, Despaigne earned a spot on the national taekwondo team—a position he held for 15 years. The pinnacle of his taekwondo career came in 2012 when he represented Cuba in the Olympic Games held in London, clinching a bronze medal in the heavyweight category.

In 2012, amidst rumblings of dissatisfaction with the state of sports in Cuba, he decided to make a significant shift. "I was losing love for the sport in 2012. A lot was going on in Cuba where I wasn’t really happy about the sport,” Despaigne explained. Encouraged by his coach to explore mixed martial arts (MMA), he initially hesitated due to concerns about the knockout-heavy reputation of the sport. Eventually, after watching fights and realizing his potential, Despaigne made the decision to venture into the world of MMA.

In 2019, he commenced MMA-specific training in Cuba, incorporating grappling into his routine. Faced with pandemic-related delays, Despaigne made the pivotal decision to relocate to Orlando, Florida, in 2022, where he continues to reside and train.

== Taekwondo career ==
Despaigne won the bronze medal at the 2012 Summer Olympics in the +80 kg event. He beat Chika Yagazie Chukwumerije in the first round, before losing to Anthony Obame in sudden death in the quarterfinal. Because Obame reached the final Despaigne was entered into the repechage. There he beat Kaino Thomsen-Fuataga, with the fight stopped because of the points difference. He beat Daba Modibo Keita in his bronze medal match by walkover as Keita could not compete due to injury.

== Mixed martial arts career ==
=== Early career ===
Despaigne made his MMA debut against Katuma Mulumba on 3 June 2022 at Titan FC 77. He won the bout at the end of the first round via TKO stoppage. He then recorded three fights in 2023, winning all by knockout in less than 20 seconds.

=== Ultimate Fighting Championship ===
Despaigne was signed by the Ultimate Fighting Championship in December 2023.

Despaigne faced Josh Parisian on 9 March 2024, at UFC 299. He won the fight via knockout 18 seconds into the first round. This fight earned him the Performance of the Night award.

Despaigne faced Waldo Cortes-Acosta on 11 May 2024, at UFC on ESPN 56. He lost the fight by unanimous decision.

Despaigne faced Austen Lane on 19 October 2024 at UFC Fight Night 245. He lost the fight by unanimous decision.

Despaigne was released from the UFC shortly after his loss to Lane.

=== Karate Combat ===
On 11 November 2024, it was reported that Despaigne had signed with Karate Combat.

Despaigne faced Dominik Jedrzejczyk on 19 December 2024 at Karate Combat 51 and won by knockout four seconds into the first round.

Despaigne faced Marcos Brigagao on 24 January 2025 at Karate Combat 52. He won by knockout 12 seconds into the first round.

Despaigne faced Roggers Souza on 28 February 2025 at Karate Combat 53. He won by knockout 8 seconds into the first round.

Despaigne competed and won the 8-man heavyweight tournament for the #1 contender on 18 July 2025 at Karate Combat 55. He defeated former Glory Light Heavyweight Champion Saulo Cavalari by unanimous decision in the first bout, Timothy Johnson by technical knockout in the first round for the second bout, and Zach Pauga via technical knockout by doctor stoppage at the end of the first round to win the "Last Man Standing" tournament.

He competed against current champion Sam Alvey at Karate Combat 58 on 5 December 2025 and won the heavyweight championship by knockout in the first round.

=== Global Fight League ===
On 11 December 2024, it was announced that Despaigne had signed with Global Fight League.

Despaigne was scheduled to face Todd Duffee in the inaugural Global Fight League event on 24 May 2025 at GFL 1. However, the first two GFL events were postponed indefinitely.

=== Most Valuable Promotions ===
Despaigne faced Junior dos Santos on 16 May 2026 at MVP MMA 1. He won the fight by knockout in the first round.

=== Return to the UFC ===
On 24 July 2026, it was reported that Despaigne had re-signed with the UFC.

Despaigne faced Tai Tuivasa on 19 September 2026 at UFC 331. He won the fight by split decision.

== Championships and accomplishments ==
=== Mixed martial arts ===
- Ultimate Fighting Championship
  - Performance of the Night (One time) vs. Josh Parisian
  - Second fastest finish/knockout by a debuting heavyweight in UFC history (18 seconds) (behind Todd Duffee's 7 seconds)
  - Longest reach in UFC history (87" wingspan)

=== Full contact karate ===
- Karate Combat
  - Karate Combat Heavyweight Champion (One time; current)

== Mixed martial arts record ==
Professional record breakdown
9 matches	7 wins	2 losses
By knockout	6	0
By decision	1	2

Res.	Record	Opponent	Method	Event	Date	Round	Time	Location	Notes
Win	7–2	Tai Tuivasa	Decision (split)	UFC 331	19 September 2026	3	5:00	Los Angeles, California, United States	
Win	6–2	Junior dos Santos	KO (punches)	MVP MMA: Rousey vs. Carano	16 May 2026	1	2:59	Inglewood, California, United States	
Loss	5–2	Austen Lane	Decision (unanimous)	UFC Fight Night: Hernandez vs. Pereira	19 October 2024	3	5:00	Las Vegas, Nevada, United States	
Loss	5–1	Waldo Cortes-Acosta	Decision (unanimous)	UFC on ESPN: Lewis vs. Nascimento	11 May 2024	3	5:00	St. Louis, Missouri, United States	
Win	5–0	Josh Parisian	TKO (punches)	UFC 299	9 March 2024	1	0:18	Miami, Florida, United States	Performance of the Night.
Win	4–0	Miles Banks	KO (punch)	Fury FC 84	3 December 2023	1	0:04	Houston, Texas, United States	
Win	3–0	Stevie Payne	TKO (punches)	Fury FC: Challenger Series 7	24 September 2023	1	0:03	Houston, Texas, United States	
Win	2–0	Travis Gregoire	TKO (punches)	Fury FC 80	25 June 2023	1	0:12	Houston, Texas, United States	
Win	1–0	Katuma Mulumba	TKO (punches)	Titan FC 77	3 June 2022	1	4:54	Miramar, Florida, United States	Heavyweight debut.

== Karate Combat record ==
Professional record breakdown
7 matches	7 wins	0 losses
By knockout	6	0
By decision	1	0

Res.	Record	Opponent	Method	Event	Date	Round	Time	Location	Notes
Win	7–0	Sam Alvey	KO (head kick)	Karate Combat 58	5 December 2025	2	2:07	Doral, Florida, United States	Won the Karate Combat Heavyweight Championship.
Win	6–0	Zach Pauga	TKO (doctor stoppage)	Karate Combat 55	18 July 2025	1	3:00	Miami, Florida, United States	Won the Last Man Standing Tournament.
Win	5–0	Timothy Johnson	TKO (punches)	Karate Combat 55	18 July 2025	1	0:20	Miami, Florida, United States	Last Man Standing Semifinal.
Win	4–0	Saulo Cavalari	Decision (unanimous)	Karate Combat 55	18 July 2025	2	3:00	Miami, Florida, United States	Last Man Standing Quarterfinal.
Win	3–0	Roggers Souza	KO (punch)	Karate Combat 53	28 February 2025	1	0:08	Denver, Colorado, United States	
Win	2–0	Marcos Brigagão	KO (punches)	Karate Combat 52	24 January 2025	1	0:12	Miami, Florida, United States	
Win	1–0	Dominik Jędrzejczyk	KO (punch)	Karate Combat 51	19 December 2024	1	0:04	Miami, Florida, United States	

== See also ==
- List of male mixed martial artists
