= Ruddy Zang Milama =

Gabonese sprinter

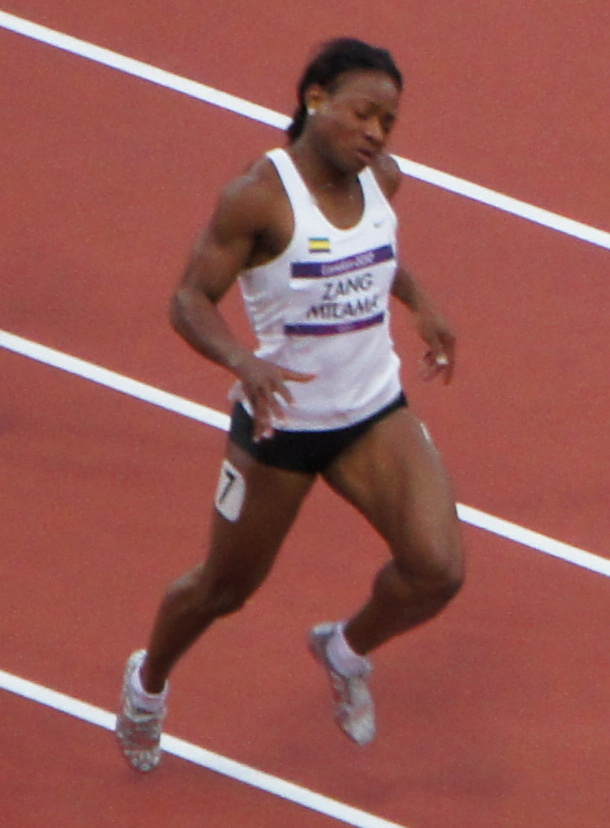

Personal information
- Born: June 6, 1987 (age 39) Port-Gentil, Gabon
- Height: 1.56 m (5 ft 1 1/2 in)
- Weight: 53 kg (117 lb)

Sport
- Country: Gabon
- Sport: Athletics
- Event: 100 metres
Medal record
Women's athletics
Representing Gabon
World Indoor Championships
Bronze medal – third place	2010 Doha	60 metres
African Championships
Gold medal – first place	2012 Porto-Novo	100 m
Silver medal – second place	2010 Nairobi	100 m
Bronze medal – third place	2010 Nairobi	200 m

Perennes Paulette Ruddy Zang-Milama (born June 6, 1987) is a Gabonese sprint athlete.

== Career ==
Zang Milama represented Gabon at the 2008 Summer Olympics in Beijing. She competed at the 100 metres sprint and placed third in her first round heat after Shelly-Ann Fraser and Vida Anim in a time of 11.62 seconds. She qualified for the second round in which she failed to qualify for the semifinals as her time of 11.59 was the seventh time of her race.

In 2010, she won the bronze medal in Doha at the 2010 IAAF World Indoor Championships. Later that year she won the 100 m silver and 200 m bronze at the 2010 African Championships in Athletics in Nairobi. In 2012, she ran a Gabonese national record twice, ending with a best of 11.03 seconds over 100 m to take the gold medal at the 2012 African Championships in Athletics. At the 2012 Summer Olympics, she qualified for the semifinals in the women's 100 m. In 2013, she ran a national record of 7.12 seconds in the 60 metres in Moscow.

On 21 May 2014 Zang Milama tested positive for a prohibited substance in an in-competition test. She was subsequently handed a seven-month ban from sport.

She went on to represent Gabon at the 2016 Summer Olympics at Rio de Janeiro. This was her last official race.

Olympic Games
Preceded by Mélanie Engoang	Flagbearer for Gabon; London 2012	Succeeded by Anthony Obame
