= Aya Girard de Langlade Mpali =

Gabonese swimmer (born 2004)

Aya Mpali
Personal information
- Full name: Aya Girard de Langlade Mpali
- Nationality: Gabonese
- Born: 24 June 2004 (age 22)

Sport
- Country: Gabon
- Sport: Swimming
- Event: Women's 50m freestyle
- Coached by: Saturnin Mpali

Aya Girard de Langlade Mpali (born 24 June 2004) is a Gabonese swimmer who has represented her country in international competitions. She was chosen, together with her brother, to compete at the postponed 2020 Summer Olympics in Tokyo, swimming in the women's 50 metre freestyle heats.

== Early life ==
Aya Girard de Langlade Mpali was born on 24 June 2004 and has a brother, fellow competitive swimmer Adam Mpali. She took up swimming at the age of 4, something she says sets her apart within the national competition but is not an advantage compared to swimmers from the rest of the world.

== Career ==
Mpali and her brother competed at the 2019 African Games and 2019 World Swimming Championships; she went out in the heats at both events. She was a flagbearer for Gabon at the 2020 Summer Olympics in 2021. However, she did not have great ambitions for the competition. She was one of the first women to qualify for the Games at the World Championships in 2019, but she could no longer train after the COVID-19 pandemic took hold. Still a teenager in 2021, she explained she had more ambitions for the 2024 Summer Olympics. She was hoping to attend a university abroad where she could join a swimming club to train. She hoped to use the experience of the 2021 event as a springboard to prepare for the 2024 Games. Her brother, who lives in France, also competed for Gabon at the 2020 Olympic Games. She swam in the women's 50 metre freestyle race in the second of eleven heats on 30 July 2021 and did not proceed.

Olympic Games
Preceded by Anthony Obame	Flagbearer for Gabon; Tokyo 2020 with Anthony Obame	Succeeded by Wissy Frank Hoye Yenda Moukoula; Noelie Annette Lacour
