= Mélanie Engoang =

Gabonese Olympic judoka

Personal information
- Full name: Mélanie Engoang Nguema
- Nationality: Gabonese
- Born: 25 July 1968 (age 57)
- Occupation: Judoka
- Height: 1.72 m (5 ft 7 1/2 in)
- Weight: 78 kg (172 lb)

Sport
- Country: Gabon
- Sport: Judo
- Event: 78 kg
Medal record
Women's judo
Representing Gabon
All-Africa Games
Gold medal – first place	1999 Johannesburg	78 kg
African Championships
Gold medal – first place	1997 Casablanca	78 kg
Gold medal – first place	2000 Algiers	78 kg
Silver medal – second place	2001 Tripoli	78 kg
Silver medal – second place	2002 Cairo	78 kg
Silver medal – second place	2004 Tunis	78 kg
Jeux de la Francophonie
Bronze medal – third place	1989 Casablanca/Rabat	66 kg
Silver medal – second place	1994 Paris/Évry-Bondoufle	66 kg
Silver medal – second place	1997 Antananarivo	72 kg
Gold medal – first place	2001 Ottawa-Gatineau	79 kg

Profile at external databases
- JudoInside.com: 2624

Mélanie Engoang Nguema (born July 25, 1968) is a Gabonese judoka (3rd dan) and coach, who played for the half-heavyweight category. She is a five-time medalist (two golds and three silver) for her division at the African Judo Championships, and gold medalist at the 1999 All-Africa Games in Johannesburg, South Africa. She also competed at four Summer Olympic games (1992 in Barcelona, 1996 in Atlanta, 2000 in Sydney, and, 2004 in Athens), but she neither reached the final round, nor claimed an Olympic medal. For being the most experienced member at the Olympics, Engoang was the nation's three-time flag bearer at the opening ceremonies.

Olympic Games
Preceded by Roger Oyembo	Flagbearer for Gabon; Sydney 2000; Athens 2004; Beijing 2008	Succeeded by Ruddy Zang Milama
