= Noëlie Lacour =

Gabonese swimmer

Personal information
- Full name: Noëlie Annette Suzanne Lacour
- Nationality: Gabonese
- Born: 1 December 2006 (age 19) Bergerac, Dordogne, France

Sport
- Country: Gabon
- Sport: Swimming

Noëlie Annette Suzanne Lacour (born 1 December 2006) is a Gabonese swimmer, specializing in the women's 50m freestyle. She carried the Gabonese flag at the opening ceremony of the 2024 Summer Olympics in Paris. She holds the national record in the event.

== Biography ==
Noélie Annette Lacour was born in France in the commune of Bergerac in Dordogne to a French father and Gabonese mother. Her mother is Gabonese and her father French. Passionate about sports, she enjoys triathlon, horse riding and basketball but is a professional swimmer. She lives in France with her parents.

== Sports career ==
=== 2024 African Swimming Championships ===
Although born and raised in France, Lacour made her swimming debut for Gabon at the Pan African Games held in March 2024 in Accra, Ghana, thanks to a special invitation from the Gabonese Swimming Federation. She participated in the 50-meter freestyle and finished in 6th place with a time of 28.08 seconds. In May 2024, during her participation in the 2024 African Swimming Championships held in Luanda, Angola, she finished sixteenth twice in the 50m freestyle and 50m butterfly.

=== 2024 Summer Olympics ===
She was the female flag bearer for Gabon at the Parade of Nations at the 2024 Summer Olympics during the opening ceremony alongside athlete Wissy Frank Hoye Yenda Moukoula. She swam in the 50-meter freestyle qualifying round. She competed in the fourth qualifying group, swimming in lane 4, and with a time of 27.68 seconds, she took first place in her qualifying group, but this time was insufficient to qualify her for the semifinals. To do so, she would have needed to be among the top sixteen overall.

=== 2024 African Nations Junior and Senior Zone 2 Championship ===
At the Zone 2 African Junior and Senior Swimming Championships in Accra, Ghana, in 2024, she became African vice-champion, winning a silver medal in the 100-meter freestyle. This was reported as a source of national pride for Gabon. At this championship, she won a total of five medals, including three bronze and two silver medals.

=== National meeting X’Eau Grand-Cognac ===
At the 6th edition at the X'Eau Grand-Cognac in the Charente department, she won her first gold medal in the final of the 50 meters freestyle.

== See also ==
- Gabon at the 2024 Summer Olympics
- 2024 Summer Olympics closing ceremony flag bearers
