= Adam Girard de Langlade Mpali =

Gabonese swimmer

Adam Mpali
Personal information
- Full name: Adam Girard de Langlade Mpali
- Nationality: Gabonese
- Born: May 29, 2002 (age 24)

Sport
- Country: Gabon
- Sport: Swimming
- Event: Men's 50m freestyle

Achievements and titles
- Olympic finals: Competed at the 2020 Summer Olympics.

Adam Girard de Langlade Mpali (born 29 May 2002) is a Gabonese swimmer who competed at the 2020 Summer Olympics.

== Early life ==
Adam Girard de Langlade Mpali was born on 29 May 2002 and has a sister, fellow competitive swimmer Aya Mpali. In 2011, when Mpali was 9, his family went on a boating trip to Point Denis but the boat began sinking and the family had to swim for miles; Aya and Adam survived the three-hour swim but their parents did not make it.

== Career ==
Mpali competed at the 2019 African Games and 2019 World Swimming Championships with his sister; he went out in the heats at both events. He lives in France and competed for Gabon at the 2020 Olympic Games. He qualified for the Olympics at the 2019 World Championships, though placed 128th overall.
