= Flag of Gabon =

Gabonese Republic
- Use: National flag and ensign
- Proportion: 3:4
- Adopted: 9 August 1960; 66 years ago
- Design: A horizontal triband of green, gold, and blue
- State flag of Gabon with the national seal
- Use: State flag
- Proportion: 3:4
- Standard of the president of Gabon
- Use: Other
- Proportion: 3:4
- Adopted: 2016; 10 years ago

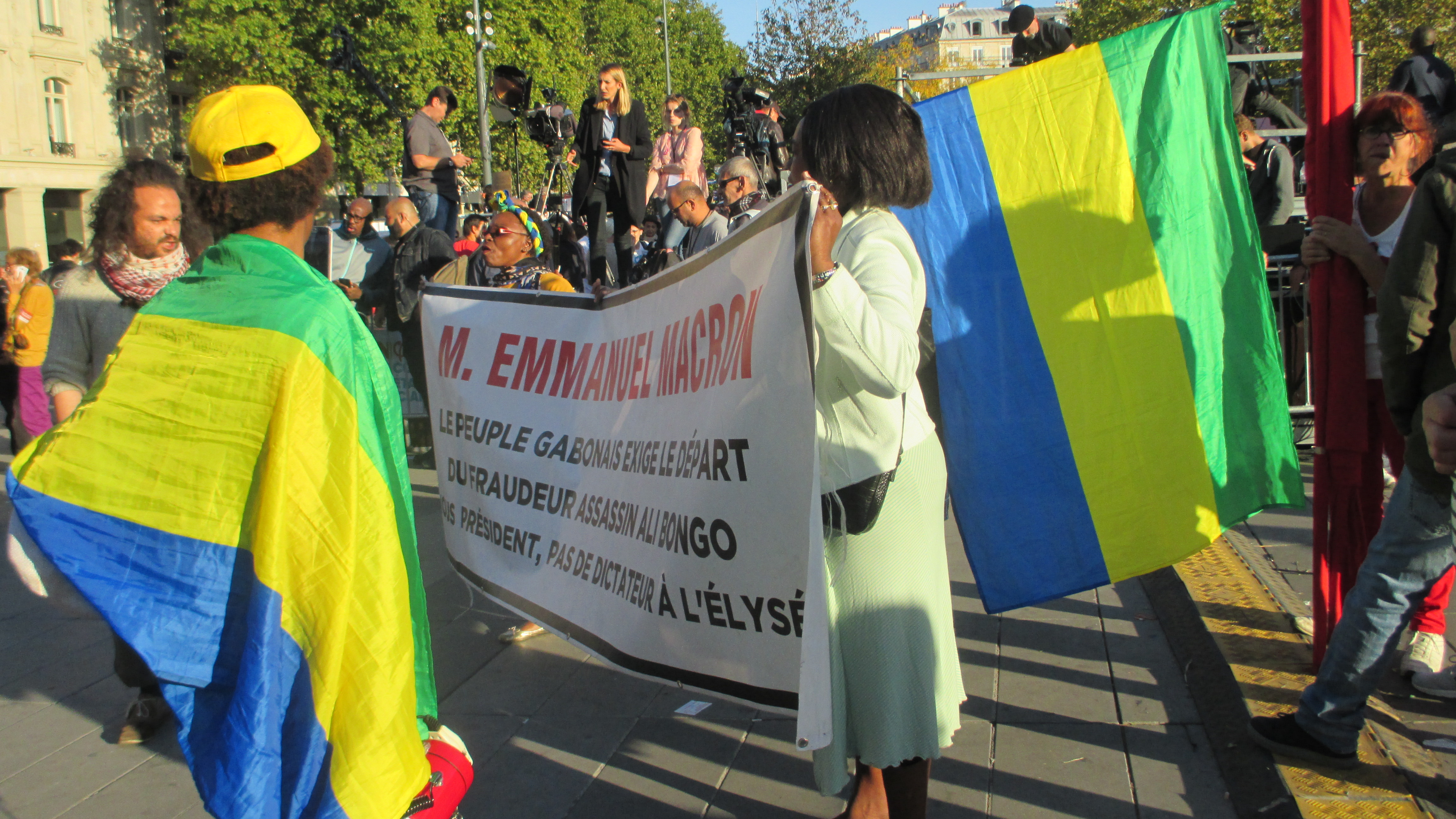
Protestors with Gabonese flags

The flag of Gabon (French: drapeau du Gabon) is a tricolour consisting of three horizontal green, yellow, and blue bands. Adopted in 1960 to replace the previous colonial flag containing the French Tricolour at the canton, it has been the flag of the Gabonese Republic since the country gained independence that year. The design of the present flag entailed the removal of the Tricolour and the widening of the yellow stripe at the centre.

== History ==
The French gained control of modern-day Gabon in 1839, when a local chief surrendered the sovereignty of his land to them. The Berlin Conference of 1885 solidified France's claim to the territory through diplomatic recognition, and it later became part of French Equatorial Africa in 1910. Under French colonial rule over Gabon, the authorities forbade the colony from utilizing its own distinctive colonial flag. This was because they were worried that this could increase nationalistic sentiment and lead to calls for independence. However, with the rise of the decolonization movement in Africa, the French were obliged to grant limited autonomy to Gabon as a self-governing republic within the French Community. This was granted in 1958 after a referendum was held supporting the proposal.

Gabon – considered "one of the more progressive" of French colonies – swiftly formulated a design for a new flag, which was officially adopted a year later in 1959. It featured a horizontal tricolour identical to the current flag, but with the yellow stripe at the centre narrower than the green and blue bands surrounding it. The French Tricolour was situated at the canton of the flag, making Gabon the only French autonomous republic to feature this "symbolic link" with France.

On 9 August 1960 – just over a week before Gabon became an independent country on 17 August – the flag was slightly modified. The change entailed removing the Tricolour at the canton and enlarging the yellow stripe at the centre, thus giving it equal width with the two other bands.

== Design ==
=== Symbolism ===
The colours and symbols of the flag carry cultural, political, and regional meanings. The yellow alludes to the Equator – which cuts across the country – and also symbolizes the sun. The green epitomizes the natural resources of Gabon, as well as its "extensive forested area" that the Gabonese people are economically dependent on in the form of lumber. The blue represents the sea, specifically the South Atlantic Ocean along which the country has an "extensive coast". While Whitney Smith in the Encyclopædia Britannica and Dorling Kindersley's Complete Flags of the World describe the centre band as solely yellow, The World Factbook characterizes it as both yellow and gold.

=== Distinctiveness ===
The proportions of Gabon's flag are 3:4. This uncommon flag ratio, which is enshrined by Gabonese law, is shared by the flags of only three other countries – Democratic Republic of the Congo (some sources state that the proportions are 2:3), Papua New Guinea and San Marino. Furthermore, the country's flag does not utilize the green, yellow and red colours of the Pan-Africanist movement, in contrast to its neighbouring countries. Unlike other former French colonies in Africa, the flag consists of a horizontal tricolour, rather than a vertical one modelled after the flag of France. The former Flag of Sudan also uses the same color scheme, but inverted.

=== Colours ===
The colours on the Gabonese flag are:

Scheme	Green	Gold	Blue
Pantone (Paper)	355 C	109 C	293 C
Web colours	#009639	#FFD100	#003DA5
RGB	0, 150, 57	255, 209, 0	0, 61, 165
CMYK	100%, 0%, 62%, 41%	0%, 18%, 100%, 0%	100%, 63%, 0%, 35%

== Presidential flags ==
Flag	Duration	Use	Description
	1960–1990	Presidential Standard of Gabon	Banner of arms. Green field with three yellow circles forming the top third. The bottom two-thirds feature a yellow field, with a galleon flying the flag of Gabon at the stern sailing on the sea with three blue waves.
	1990–2016	Presidential Standard of Gabon	Horizontal green and blue bands separated by a yellow band at the centre, with the coat of arms in a white circle in the middle.
	2016–present	Presidential Standard of Gabon	Coat of arms on a navy blue background with bands the same colours as the national flag in each corner, from the edge green, yellow, and blue.

== Naval flags ==
Flag	Duration	Use	Description
	?–?	Smaller replacement of the Gabonese Navy masthead pennant	On the hoist, a tricolor of green, yellow, and blue; on the fly, a white field charged with the arms of the Gabonese Navy.
	de facto	Naval Jack of Gabon	The same as the national flag with a 1:1 ratio.

== Ethnic group flags ==
Flag	Duration	Use	Description
	?–present	Flag of the Kongo people	A tricolor of red, white, and yellow with a white five-pointed star on the center.

== Provincial flags ==
Flag	Province	Description
	Estuaire	Estuaire coat of arms on a white field
	Haut-Ogooué	Haut-Ogooué coat of arms on a white field
	Moyen-Ogooué	Moyen-Ogooué coat of arms on a white field
	Ngounié	Ngounié coat of arms on a white field
	Nyanga	Nyanga coat of arms on a white field
	Ogooué-Ivindo	Ogooué-Ivindo coat of arms on a white field
	Ogooué-Lolo	Ogooué-Lolo coat of arms on a white field
	Ogooué-Maritime	Ogooué-Maritime coat of arms on a white field
	Woleu-Ntem	Woleu-Ntem coat of arms on a white field

== Municipal flags ==
Flag	Duration	Use	Description
		Flag of Libreville	Libreville coat of arms on a white field
		Flag of Libreville	Libreville coat of arms with the black text "Mairie de Libreville" on a white field

== Historical flags ==
Flag	Duration	Use	Description
	1959–1960	Flag of Gabon	Horizontal green and blue bands separated by a thinner yellow band at the centre, with the French Tricolour at the canton.
