= Gabonese Olympic Committee =

National Olympic Committee

- Country: Gabon
- [[|]]
- Code: GAB
- Recognized: 1968
- Continental Association: ANOCA
- Headquarters: Libreville, Gabon
- President: Léon Louis Folquet
- Secretary General: André Franck Angwe Aboughe
- Website: cnog.ga

The Gabonese Olympic Committee (French: Comité Olympique Gabonais) (IOC code: GAB) is the National Olympic Committee representing Gabon.

== See also ==
- Gabon at the Olympics
