= Taekwondo at the 2015 European Games – Qualification =

Taekwondo competition

There will be a total of 128 qualifying places available for taekwondo at the 2015 European Games: 64 for men and 64 for women. 16 athletes will compete in each of the 8 events. Each competing nation will be allowed to enter a maximum of 8 competitors in total (4 men and 4 women), and a maximum of 1 athlete in any weight class. Hosts Azerbaijan is also allowed to enter an athlete in each weight class. Quota places will be allocated by reference to the World Taekwondo Federation Olympic Ranking List as it stands on 31 March 2015.

== Qualification summary ==
NOC	Men				Women				Total
NOC	58kg	68kg	80kg	+80kg	49kg	57kg	67kg	+67kg	Total
Armenia			X						1
Austria				X				X	2
Azerbaijan	X	X	X	X	X	X	X	X	8
Belarus	X			X					2
Belgium	X	X			X				3
Bulgaria		X	X						2
Croatia	X	X	X	X	X	X	X	X	8
Cyprus		X		X	X	X			4
Denmark					X				1
Finland						X			1
France	X	X	X	X	X	X	X	X	8
Germany	X	X	X	X	X	X	X	X	8
Great Britain	X	X	X	X	X	X		X	7
Greece	X				X		X		3
Hungary					X	X			2
Israel	X								1
Italy		X	X	X					3
Moldova	X	X	X						3
Netherlands				X			X	X	3
Norway								X	1
Poland			X	X			X	X	4
Portugal	X	X	X			X			4
Russia	X	X	X	X	X	X	X	X	8
Serbia	X		X		X	X	X	X	6
Slovenia		X		X			X		3
Spain	X	X	X	X	X	X	X	X	8
Sweden						X	X	X	3
Switzerland						X	X		2
Turkey	X	X	X	X	X	X	X	X	8
Ukraine					X		X	X	3
30 NOC's	15	15	15	15	15	15	15	15	120

== Men ==
=== 58 kg ===
Means of qualification	Total places	Qualified athletes
Host nation	1	Azerbaijan
WTF Olympic Rankings	14	Rui Bragança (POR); Levent Tuncat (GER); Si Mohamed Ketbi (BEL); Stepan Dimitrov (MDA); Dylan Chellamootoo (FRA); Jesús Tortosa Cabrera (ESP); Georgios Simitsis (GRE); Arman Irgaliev (RUS); Stipe Jarloni (CRO); Görkem Sezer (TUR); Max Cater (GBR); Illia Kokshyntsau (BLR); Milos Gladović (SRB); Gili Haimovitz (ISR)
Universality place	1	
Total	16	

=== 68 kg ===
Means of qualification	Total places	Qualified athletes
Host nation	1	Azerbaijan
WTF Olympic Rankings	14	Alexey Denisenko (RUS); Jaouad Achab (BEL); Joel Gonzalez Bonilla (ESP); Servet Tazegül (TUR); Mario Silva (POR); Filip Grgic (CRO); Stevens Barclais (FRA); Daniel Manz (GER); Ruebyn Richards (GBR); Jure Pantar (SLO); Vladislav Arventii (MDA); Ioannis Pilavakis (CYP); Vladimir Dalakliev (BUL); Claudio Treviso (ITA)
Universality place	1	
Total	16	

=== 80 kg ===
Means of qualification	Total places	Qualified athletes
Host nation	1	Azerbaijan
WTF Olympic Rankings	14	Aaron Cook (MDA); Albert Gaun (RUS); Lutalo Muhammad (GBR); Tahir Guelec (GER); Torann Maizeroi (FRA); Julio Ferreira (POR); Yunus Sarı (TUR); Arman Yeremyan (ARM); Teodor Georgiev (BUL); Damir Fejzic (SRB); Piotr Pazinski (POL); Raúl Martinez García (ESP); Roberto Botta (ITA); Toni Kanaet (CRO)
Universality place	1	
Total	16	

=== +80 kg ===
Means of qualification	Total places	Qualified athletes
Host nation	1	Azerbaijan
WTF Olympic Rankings	14	M'bar N'diaye (FRA); Mahama Cho (GBR); Volker Wodzich (GER); Vedran Golec (CRO); Arman-Marchall Silla (BLR); Ivan Trajkovič (SLO); Leonardo Basile (ITA); Ali Sarı (TUR); Jeroen Wanrooij (NED); Daniel Ros Gómez (ESP); Vladislav Larin (RUS); Piotr Hatowski (POL); Ahmad Mohammadi (AUT); Demetris Moustakas (CYP)
Universality place	1	
Total	16	

== Women ==
=== 49 kg ===
Means of qualification	Total places	Qualified athletes
Host nation	1	Azerbaijan
WTF Olympic Rankings	14	Lucija Zaninovic (CRO); Yasmina Aziez (FRA); Kyriaki Kouttouki (CYP); Brigitte Yagüe Enrique (ESP); Rukiye Yıldırım (TUR); Iryna Romoldanova (UKR); Ivett Gonda (HUN); Tijana Bogdanovic (SRB); Indra Craen (BEL); Ioanna Koutsou (GRE); Alexandra Lynchagina (RUS); Sarah Malykke (DEN); Charlie Maddock (GBR); Erica Nicoli (ITA)
Universality place	1	
Total	16	

=== 57 kg ===
Means of qualification	Total places	Qualified athletes
Host nation	1	Azerbaijan
WTF Olympic Rankings	14	Jade Jones (GBR); Eva Calvo Gomez (ESP); Nikita Glasnović (SWE); Floriane Liborio (FRA); Ana Zaninovic (CRO); Anna-Lena Frömming (GER); Hatice Kübra Yangın (TUR); Suvi Mikkonen (FIN); Manuela Bazzola (SUI); Dragana Gladovic (SRB); Ekaterina Kim (RUS); Edina Kotsis (HUN); Joana Cunha (POR); Despina Pilavaki (CYP)
Universality place	1	
Total	16	

=== 67 kg ===
Means of qualification	Total places	Qualified athletes
Host nation	1	Azerbaijan
WTF Olympic Rankings	14	Elin Johansson (SWE); Haby Niare (FRA); Anastasiia Baryshnikova (RUS); Nina Kläy (SUI); Martina Sumic (CRO); Rabia Gülec (GER); Nur Tatar (TUR); Franka Anic (SLO); Lua Piñeiro Devesa (ESP); Ana Bajic (SRB); Aleksandra Krzemieneicka (POL); Joyce van Baaren (NED); Elpida Marina Dimitropoulou (GRE); Tetiana Tetereviatnykova (UKR)
Universality place	1	
Total	16	

=== +67 kg ===
Means of qualification	Total places	Qualified athletes
Host nation	1	Azerbaijan
WTF Olympic Rankings	14	Milica Mandic (SRB); Reshmie Oogink (NED); Olga Ivanova (RUS); Anne-Caroline Graffe (FRA); Iva Rados (CRO); Bianca Walkden (GBR); Aleksandra Kowalczuk (POL); Rosanna Simon Alama (ESP); Casandra Ikonen (SWE); Furkan Asena Aydın (TUR); Yanna Schneider (GER); Maryna Konieva (UKR); Edines Kurtovic (AUT); Tina Skaar (NOR)
Universality place	1	
Total	16	
