= 2015 World Taekwondo Championships – Women's heavyweight =

Taekwondo competition

Women's heavyweight at the 2015 World Championships
- Venue: Traktor Ice Arena
- Dates: 15–16 May 2015
- Competitors: 30 from 30 nations

Medalists
gold medal	Bianca Walkden	Great Britain
silver medal	Gwladys Épangue	France
bronze medal	Nafia Kuş	Turkey
bronze medal	Olga Ivanova	Russia

The women's heavyweight is a competition featured at the 2015 World Taekwondo Championships, and was held at the Traktor Ice Arena in Chelyabinsk, Russia on May 15 and May 16.

Heavyweights were limited to a minimum of 73 kilograms in body mass.

Bianca Walkden from Great Britain won the gold medal. She beat Gwladys Épangue of France 4–2 in the gold medal match to win her first world championship title.

== Results ==
- DQ — Won by disqualification
- R — Won by referee stop contest

=== Final ===
Final
Bianca Walkden (GBR)	4
Gwladys Épangue (FRA)	2

=== Top half ===
Round of 32
Carlota Munave (SWZ)	2
Hadja Diabaté (CIV)	8
Nafia Kuş (TUR)	DQ
Jessica Bravo (COL)
Danese Joseph (ISV)
Akram Khodabandeh (IRI)	DQ
Aleksandra Kowalczuk (POL)	8^{R}
Mereke Zhunussova (KAZ)	2
Kim Shin-bi (KOR)	2
Lauren Hamon (USA)	1
Katherine Rodríguez (DOM)
Kuo Yi-chun (TPE)	DQ
Eleni Salinoudi (GRE)	7
Bianca Walkden (GBR)	13

Round of 16
Briseida Acosta (MEX)	13
Hadja Diabaté (CIV)	3
Nafia Kuş (TUR)	9
Akram Khodabandeh (IRI)	8
Aleksandra Kowalczuk (POL)	4
Kim Shin-bi (KOR)	2
Kuo Yi-chun (TPE)	2
Bianca Walkden (GBR)	7

Quarterfinals
Briseida Acosta (MEX)	3
Nafia Kuş (TUR)	4
Aleksandra Kowalczuk (POL)	1
Bianca Walkden (GBR)	2

Semifinals
Nafia Kuş (TUR)	3
Bianca Walkden (GBR)	10

=== Bottom half ===
Round of 32
Gwladys Épangue (FRA)	7
Lorena Brandl (GER)	3
Mokhru Khalimova (TJK)	4
Maryna Konieva (UKR)	2
Violeta Babić (SRB)	13
Tassya Stevens (AUS)	1
Helloraine Paiva (BRA)	4
Li Donghua (CHN)	9
Rosana Simón (ESP)	4
Nuša Rajher (SLO)	5
Jasmine Vokey (CAN)	3
Wiam Dislam (MAR)	6
Mena Maher (EGY)	11
Keyla Ávila (HON)	12

Round of 16
Gwladys Épangue (FRA)	5
Mokhru Khalimova (TJK)	3
Violeta Babić (SRB)	7
Li Donghua (CHN)	6
Nuša Rajher (SLO)	5
Wiam Dislam (MAR)	3
Keyla Ávila (HON)	2
Olga Ivanova (RUS)	14

Quarterfinals
Gwladys Épangue (FRA)	6
Violeta Babić (SRB)	0
Nuša Rajher (SLO)	0
Olga Ivanova (RUS)	8

Semifinals
Gwladys Épangue (FRA)	8
Olga Ivanova (RUS)	5
