= Taekwondo at the 2015 European Games – Women's +67 kg =

Taekwondo competition

Women's +67 kg at the 2015 European Games
- Venue: Crystal Hall complex
- Date: 19 June
- Competitors: 16 from 16 nations

Medalists
gold medal	Gwladys Épangue	France
silver medal	Milica Mandić	Serbia
bronze medal	Iva Radoš	Croatia
bronze medal	Olga Ivanova	Russia

Women's +67 kg competition at the Taekwondo at the 2015 European Games in Baku, Azerbaijan, took place on 19 June at Crystal Hall complex.

== Schedule ==
All times are Azerbaijan Summer Time (UTC+5).

Date	Time	Event
Tuesday, 19 June 2015	11:00	1/8 finals
Tuesday, 19 June 2015	13:00	Quarterfinals
Tuesday, 19 June 2015	13:00	Semifinals
Tuesday, 19 June 2015	15:00	Repechage
Tuesday, 19 June 2015	19:00	Finals

== Results ==
1/8 finals
Milica Mandić (SRB)	11
Anđela Popović (MNE)	1
Rosana Simón (ESP)	5
Aleksandra Kowalczuk (POL)	4
Bianca Walkden (GBR)	9
Furkan Asena Aydın (TUR)	6
Maryna Konieva (UKR)	10
Marina Tedeeva (AZE)	4
Gwladys Épangue (FRA)	6
Nusa Rajher (SLO)	2
Yanna Schneider (GER)	4
Olga Ivanova (RUS)	5
Iva Radoš (CRO)	15
Casandra Ikonen (SWE)	3
Tina Skaar (NOR)	5
Reshmie Oogink (NED)	11

Quarterfinals
Milica Mandić (SRB)	12
Rosana Simón (ESP)	3
Bianca Walkden (GBR)	13
Maryna Konieva (UKR)	14
Gwladys Épangue (FRA)	7
Olga Ivanova (RUS)	3
Iva Radoš (CRO)	7
Reshmie Oogink (NED)	3

Semifinals
Milica Mandić (SRB)	15
Maryna Konieva (UKR)	1
Gwladys Épangue (FRA)	13
Iva Radoš (CRO)	6

Final
Milica Mandić (SRB)	8
Gwladys Épangue (FRA)	9

=== Repechage ===
Repechage round 1
Rosana Simón (ESP)	6
Anđela Popović (MNE)	1
Nusa Rajher (SLO)	1
Olga Ivanova (RUS)	2

Bronze medal match
Rosana Simón (ESP)	4
Iva Radoš (CRO)	12
Olga Ivanova (RUS)	7
Maryna Konieva (UKR)	3
