= 2017 World Taekwondo Championships – Women's heavyweight =

Taekwondo competition

Women's heavyweight at the 2017 World Championships
- Venue: Taekwondowon
- Dates: 27–28 June 2017
- Competitors: 37 from 37 nations

Medalists
gold medal	Bianca Walkden	Great Britain
silver medal	Jackie Galloway	United States
bronze medal	An Sae-bom	South Korea
bronze medal	Zheng Shuyin	China

The women's heavyweight is a competition featured at the 2017 World Taekwondo Championships, and was held at the Taekwondowon in Muju County, South Korea on June 27 and June 28. Heavyweights were limited to a minimum of 73 kilograms in body mass.

== Results ==
Legend

- DQ — Won by disqualification
- P — Won by punitive declaration
- W — Won by withdrawal

=== Finals ===
Semifinals		Final
Bianca Walkden (GBR)	9
An Sae-bom (KOR)	3	Bianca Walkden (GBR)	14
Jackie Galloway (USA)	4	Jackie Galloway (USA)	4
Zheng Shuyin (CHN)	3

=== Top half ===
==== Section 1 ====
Round of 64
Rodali Barua (IND)	7
Leonor Esteban (NCA)	15^{P}

Round of 32
Bianca Walkden (GBR)	20
Leonor Esteban (NCA)	1
Melani Adamić-Golić (CRO)	12
Laura Giacomini (ITA)	4
Olga Ivanova (RUS)	12
Marlene Jahl (AUT)	2
Aminata Traoré (CIV)	5
Rosana Simón (ESP)	6

Round of 16
Bianca Walkden (GBR)	26
Melani Adamić-Golić (CRO)	8
Olga Ivanova (RUS)	6
Rosana Simón (ESP)	4

Quarterfinals
Bianca Walkden (GBR)	10
Olga Ivanova (RUS)	2

==== Section 2 ====
Round of 64
Konifalanisesi Sisifa (TGA)
Emmanuelle Boudreau (CAN)	W
Carlota Munave (SWZ)	3
Uzoamaka Otuadinma (NGR)	23

Round of 32
Briseida Acosta (MEX)	21
Emmanuelle Boudreau (CAN)	1
Nuša Vujinović (SLO)	5
Akram Khodabandeh (IRI)	11
Lorena Brandl (GER)	27
Nisha Rawal (NEP)	7
Uzoamaka Otuadinma (NGR)	10
An Sae-bom (KOR)	26

Round of 16
Briseida Acosta (MEX)	14
Akram Khodabandeh (IRI)	10
Lorena Brandl (GER)	13
An Sae-bom (KOR)	24

Quarterfinals
Briseida Acosta (MEX)	10
An Sae-bom (KOR)	21

=== Bottom half ===
==== Section 3 ====
Round of 64
~~Megan Lawrence (TTO)~~
Waad Al-Tarman (JOR)	DQ

Round of 32
Jackie Galloway (USA)	8
Waad Al-Tarman (JOR)	4
Jessica Bravo (COL)	8
Ana Bajić (SRB)	1
Katherine Rodríguez (DOM)	12^{W}
Eleni Salinoudi (GRE)	7
Gabriele Siqueira (BRA)	2
Nafia Kuş (TUR)	8

Round of 16
Jackie Galloway (USA)	8
Jessica Bravo (COL)	3
Katherine Rodríguez (DOM)	5
Nafia Kuş (TUR)	14

Quarterfinals
Jackie Galloway (USA)	6
Nafia Kuş (TUR)	5

==== Section 4 ====
Round of 64
Chelsea Hobday (AUS)	17
Thato Tau (BOT)	0

Round of 32
Aleksandra Kowalczuk (POL)	28
Annelisse Velázquez (PUR)	1
Ma Ting-hsia (TPE)	7
Wiam Dislam (MAR)	9
Maéva Mellier (FRA)	19
Mereke Zhunussova (KAZ)	11
Chelsea Hobday (AUS)	7
Zheng Shuyin (CHN)	9

Round of 16
Aleksandra Kowalczuk (POL)	5
Wiam Dislam (MAR)	9
Maéva Mellier (FRA)	6
Zheng Shuyin (CHN)	18

Quarterfinals
Wiam Dislam (MAR)	6
Zheng Shuyin (CHN)	13
