= 2011 World Taekwondo Championships – Women's heavyweight =

Taekwondo competition

Women's heavyweight at the 2011 World Championships
- Venue: Gyeongju Indoor Stadium
- Dates: 6 May 2011
- Competitors: 33 from 33 nations

Medalists
gold medal	Anne-Caroline Graffe	France
silver medal	An Sae-bom	South Korea
bronze medal	Rosana Simón	Spain
bronze medal	Olga Ivanova	Russia

The women's heavyweight is a competition featured at the 2011 World Taekwondo Championships, and was held at the Gyeongju Gymnasium in Gyeongju, South Korea on May 6. Heavyweight were limited to a minimum of 73 kilograms in body mass.

== Results ==
Legend

- DQ — Won by disqualification
- P — Won by punitive declaration
- W — Won by withdrawal

=== Finals ===
Semifinals		Final
Rosana Simón (ESP)	0
An Sae-bom (KOR)	8	An Sae-bom (KOR)	0
Anne-Caroline Graffe (FRA)	5	Anne-Caroline Graffe (FRA)	1
Olga Ivanova (RUS)	0

=== Top half ===
==== Section 1 ====
Round of 64
~~Carolina Fernández (VEN)~~
Helloraine Paiva (BRA)	DQ

Round of 32
Rosana Simón (ESP)	4
Helloraine Paiva (BRA)	2
Kyriaki Kouvari (GRE)
Zheng Shuyin (CHN)	W
Lauren Cahoon (USA)	1
Mereke Zhunussova (KAZ)	0
~~Jenifer Odhiambo (KEN)~~
Katharina Weiss (GER)	DQ

Round of 16
Rosana Simón (ESP)	0
Zheng Shuyin (CHN)	0
Lauren Cahoon (USA)	2
Katharina Weiss (GER)	1

Quarterfinals
Rosana Simón (ESP)	5
Lauren Cahoon (USA)	4

==== Section 2 ====
Round of 64

Round of 32
An Sae-bom (KOR)	9
Peng Chia-hwi (TPE)	1
Nur Tatar (TUR)	12
Maryna Konieva (UKR)	8
Linda Azzeddine (ALG)	DQ
~~Inaas Hagar (SUD)~~
Farida Azizova (AZE)	2
Evgeniya Karimova (UZB)	4

Round of 16
An Sae-bom (KOR)	4
Nur Tatar (TUR)	3
Linda Azzeddine (ALG)	1
Evgeniya Karimova (UZB)	4

Quarterfinals
An Sae-bom (KOR)	9^{P}
Evgeniya Karimova (UZB)	3

=== Bottom half ===
==== Section 3 ====
Round of 64

Round of 32
Bianca Walkden (GBR)	7
Ivana Žagar (CRO)	6
~~Lorena Díaz (COL)~~
Briseida Acosta (MEX)	DQ
Catur Yuni Riyaningsih (INA)	2
Wang Junnan (MAC)	8
Edines Kurtovic (AUT)	0
Anne-Caroline Graffe (FRA)	4

Round of 16
Bianca Walkden (GBR)	3
Briseida Acosta (MEX)	4
Wang Junnan (MAC)	0
Anne-Caroline Graffe (FRA)	1^{W}

Quarterfinals
Briseida Acosta (MEX)	5
Anne-Caroline Graffe (FRA)	7

==== Section 4 ====
Round of 64

Round of 32
Karolina Kedzierska (SWE)	3
Olga Ivanova (RUS)	9
Suzanne Sagbo (CAN)	DQ
~~Princess Dudu (NGR)~~
Natalia Rybarczyk (POL)	DQ
~~Maitha Al-Maktoum (UAE)~~
Danese Joseph (ISV)	0
Wiam Dislam (MAR)	3

Round of 16
Olga Ivanova (RUS)	16
Suzanne Sagbo (CAN)	0
Natalia Rybarczyk (POL)	2
Wiam Dislam (MAR)	3

Quarterfinals
Olga Ivanova (RUS)	1
Wiam Dislam (MAR)	0
