= 2013 World Taekwondo Championships – Women's heavyweight =

Taekwondo competition

Women's heavyweight at the 2013 World Championships
- Venue: Exhibition Center of Puebla
- Dates: 18 July 2013
- Competitors: 31 from 31 nations

Medalists
gold medal	Olga Ivanova	Russia
silver medal	Briseida Acosta	Mexico
bronze medal	Anne-Caroline Graffe	France
bronze medal	Ana Bajić	Serbia

The women's heavyweight is a competition featured at the 2013 World Taekwondo Championships, and was held at the Exhibition Center of Puebla in Puebla, Mexico on July 18.

Heavyweights were limited to a minimum of 73 kilograms in body mass.

Olga Ivanova from Russia won the gold medal. She beat the home favorite Briseida Acosta from Mexico in the gold medal match by the score of 8–3.

== Results ==
- DQ — Won by disqualification
- P — Won by punitive declaration

=== Final ===
Final
Olga Ivanova (RUS)	8
Briseida Acosta (MEX)	3

=== Top half ===
Round of 32
Sithandile Dlamini (SWZ)	2
Keyla Ávila (HON)	3
Nuša Rajher (SLO)	10
Francis Jiménez (VEN)	2
~~Shirley Kua (MAS)~~
Edines Kurtovic (AUT)	DQ
Olga Ivanova (RUS)	14
Chrystelle Naami Yang (CMR)	2
Hadja Diabaté (CIV)	4^{P}
Zhuldyz Kumisbek (KAZ)	0
Rachelle Caruso (CAN)	10
Aikaterini Gkoutoula (GRE)	2
Gabriele Siqueira (BRA)	11
Maryna Konieva (UKR)	12

Round of 16
Anne-Caroline Graffe (FRA)	10
Keyla Ávila (HON)	5
Nuša Rajher (SLO)	4
Edines Kurtovic (AUT)	3
Olga Ivanova (RUS)	17
Hadja Diabaté (CIV)	2
Rachelle Caruso (CAN)	3
Maryna Konieva (UKR)	4

Quarterfinals
Anne-Caroline Graffe (FRA)	4
Nuša Rajher (SLO)	4
Olga Ivanova (RUS)	4
Maryna Konieva (UKR)	1

Semifinals
Anne-Caroline Graffe (FRA)	12
Olga Ivanova (RUS)	13

=== Bottom half ===
Round of 32
Briseida Acosta (MEX)	8
LaShondra Rawls (USA)	6
Peng Chia-hwi (TPE)	1
Zheng Shuyin (CHN)	3
Lorena Díaz (COL)	3
Cansel Deniz (TUR)	5
Graciela Mourambou (GAB)	1
Bianca Walkden (GBR)	10
~~Linda Azzeddine (ALG)~~
Ana Bajić (SRB)	DQ
Katherine Rodríguez (DOM)	7
Lee Hye-mi (KOR)	6
Kate McAdam (AUS)	2
Wang Junnan (MAC)	1
Danese Joseph (ISV)	4
Rosana Simón (ESP)	15

Round of 16
Briseida Acosta (MEX)	8
Zheng Shuyin (CHN)	1
Cansel Deniz (TUR)	6
Bianca Walkden (GBR)	5
Ana Bajić (SRB)	6
Katherine Rodríguez (DOM)	2
Kate McAdam (AUS)	1
Rosana Simón (ESP)	14

Quarterfinals
Briseida Acosta (MEX)	13
Cansel Deniz (TUR)	4
Ana Bajić (SRB)	2
Rosana Simón (ESP)	1

Semifinals
Briseida Acosta (MEX)	5
Ana Bajić (SRB)	2
