= 2015 World Taekwondo Championships – Women's middleweight =

World Taekwondo competition

Women's middleweight at the 2015 World Championships
- Venue: Traktor Ice Arena
- Dates: 16–17 May 2015
- Competitors: 39 from 39 nations

Medalists
gold medal	Oh Hye-ri	South Korea
silver medal	Zheng Shuyin	China
bronze medal	Jackie Galloway	United States
bronze medal	Iva Radoš	Croatia

The women's middleweight is a competition featured at the 2015 World Taekwondo Championships, and was held at the Traktor Ice Arena in Chelyabinsk, Russia on May 16 and May 17. Middleweights were limited to a maximum of 73 kilograms in body mass.

== Results ==
Legend

- DQ — Won by disqualification

=== Finals ===
Semifinals		Final
Oh Hye-ri (KOR)	6
Jackie Galloway (USA)	5	Oh Hye-ri (KOR)	5
Zheng Shuyin (CHN)	8	Zheng Shuyin (CHN)	4
Iva Radoš (CRO)	1

=== Top half ===
==== Section 1 ====
Round of 64
Huang Kuan-chi (TPE)	8
Mariona Leyes (ESP)	7

Round of 32
Milica Mandić (SRB)	8
Huang Kuan-chi (TPE)	7
~~Rima Ananbeh (JOR)~~
Kirstie Alora (PHI)	DQ
Raphaella Galacho (BRA)	0
Oh Hye-ri (KOR)	5
Anne-Caroline Graffe (FRA)	4
Casandra Ikonen (SWE)	5

Round of 16
Milica Mandić (SRB)	12
Kirstie Alora (PHI)	2
Oh Hye-ri (KOR)	10
Casandra Ikonen (SWE)	5

Quarterfinals
Milica Mandić (SRB)	4
Oh Hye-ri (KOR)	13

==== Section 2 ====
Round of 64
Tina Røe Skaar (NOR)	3
Carolina Fernández (VEN)	2
Maisoun Farouk (EGY)	5
Grammatiki Christidou (GRE)	3

Round of 32
Jackie Galloway (USA)	14
Tina Røe Skaar (NOR)	8
Hanieh Akhlaghi (IRI)	15
Furkan Asena Aydın (TUR)	14
Aminata Doumbia (MLI)	5
Kristina Mishchenko (UKR)	10
Maisoun Farouk (EGY)	2
Anastasia Gurskaya (RUS)	4

Round of 16
Jackie Galloway (USA)	17
Hanieh Akhlaghi (IRI)	6
Kristina Mishchenko (UKR)	0
Anastasia Gurskaya (RUS)	7

Quarterfinals
Jackie Galloway (USA)	7
Anastasia Gurskaya (RUS)	4

=== Bottom half ===
==== Section 3 ====
Round of 64
Najia Rasool (PAK)	0
Jade Slavin (GBR)	16
Zheng Shuyin (CHN)	DQ
~~Crystal Weekes (PUR)~~

Round of 32
María Espinoza (MEX)	5
Jade Slavin (GBR)	2
Nathalie Iliesco (CAN)	0
Yanna Schneider (GER)	11
Mamina Koné (CIV)	5
Charikleia Livera (CYP)	1
Zheng Shuyin (CHN)	7
Reshmie Oogink (NED)	5

Round of 16
María Espinoza (MEX)	8
Yanna Schneider (GER)	5
Mamina Koné (CIV)	2
Zheng Shuyin (CHN)	14

Quarterfinals
María Espinoza (MEX)	2
Zheng Shuyin (CHN)	5

==== Section 4 ====
Round of 64
Mbassa Sakho (SEN)	1
Aigul Yelubay (KAZ)	4
~~Deysy Montes de Oca (DOM)~~
Nicole Men (AUS)	DQ

Round of 32
Sandra Vanegas (COL)	3
Aigul Yelubay (KAZ)	4
Anđela Popović (MNE)	1
Aleksandra Krzemieniecka (POL)	5
Petra Matijašević (MKD)	2
Marina Tedeeva (AZE)	9
Nicole Men (AUS)	1
Iva Radoš (CRO)	4

Round of 16
Aigul Yelubay (KAZ)	1
Aleksandra Krzemieniecka (POL)	3
Marina Tedeeva (AZE)	5
Iva Radoš (CRO)	6

Quarterfinals
Aleksandra Krzemieniecka (POL)	4
Iva Radoš (CRO)	5
