= 2019 World Taekwondo Championships – Women's heavyweight =

Women's heavyweight at the 2019 World Championships
- Venue: Manchester Arena
- Dates: 16–17 May 2019
- Competitors: 30 from 30 nations

Medalists
gold medal	Bianca Walkden	Great Britain
silver medal	Zheng Shuyin	China
bronze medal	Briseida Acosta	Mexico
bronze medal	Doris Pole	Croatia

The women's heavyweight is a competition featured at the 2019 World Taekwondo Championships, and was held at the Manchester Arena in Manchester, United Kingdom on 16 and 17 May.

Heavyweights were limited to a minimum of 73 kilograms in body mass.

Bianca Walkden beat Zheng Shuyin in the final to win the gold medal. Zheng was disqualified despite leading 20-11 because Walkden repeatedly forced Zheng out of the ring to accumulate Zheng's penalty points.

== Results ==
Legend

- P — Won by punitive declaration

=== Final ===
Final
Bianca Walkden (GBR)	11^{P}
Zheng Shuyin (CHN)	20

=== Top half ===
Round of 32
Belén Morán (ESP)	4
Svetlana Osipova (UZB)	16
Lorena Brandl (GER)	20
Natalie Lauridsen (DEN)	0
Megan Lawrence (TTO)	3
Olga Muzychka (RUS)	9
An Sae-bom (KOR)	20
Yasmine Kermiche (CAN)	5
Gloria Mosquera (COL)	12
Laura Giacomini (ITA)	1
Gabriele Siqueira (BRA)	16
Mereke Zhunussova (KAZ)	10
Pan Yun-ci (TPE)	9
Briseida Acosta (MEX)	12

Round of 16
Bianca Walkden (GBR)	18
Svetlana Osipova (UZB)	5
Lorena Brandl (GER)	8
Olga Muzychka (RUS)	3
An Sae-bom (KOR)	4
Gloria Mosquera (COL)	13
Gabriele Siqueira (BRA)	6
Briseida Acosta (MEX)	7

Quarterfinals
Bianca Walkden (GBR)	23
Lorena Brandl (GER)	14
Gloria Mosquera (COL)	11
Briseida Acosta (MEX)	13

Semifinals
Bianca Walkden (GBR)	19
Briseida Acosta (MEX)	9

=== Bottom half ===
Round of 32
Aleksandra Kowalczuk (POL)	22
Taylor Shaw (NZL)	1
Sude Bulut (TUR)	1
Solène Avoulette (FRA)	6
Marlene Jahl (AUT)	10
Doris Pole (CRO)	15
Hannah Keck (USA)	4
Wiam Dislam (MAR)	13
Ana Tepavac (SRB)	22
Vlada Narolska (UKR)	0
Grammatiki Christidou (GRE)	2
Katherine Rodríguez (DOM)	9
Aminata Traoré (CIV)	5
Reba Stewart (AUS)	13

Round of 16
Aleksandra Kowalczuk (POL)	5
Solène Avoulette (FRA)	3
Doris Pole (CRO)	9
Wiam Dislam (MAR)	3
Ana Tepavac (SRB)	3
Katherine Rodríguez (DOM)	2
Reba Stewart (AUS)	2
Zheng Shuyin (CHN)	7

Quarterfinals
Aleksandra Kowalczuk (POL)	5
Doris Pole (CRO)	8
Ana Tepavac (SRB)	2
Zheng Shuyin (CHN)	6

Semifinals
Doris Pole (CRO)	2
Zheng Shuyin (CHN)	9
