= 2011 World Taekwondo Olympic Qualification Tournament – Women's +67 kg =

Taekwondo competition

World Qualification Tournament
Men	Women
58 kg	49 kg
68 kg	57 kg
80 kg	67 kg
+80 kg	+67 kg

The Women's +67 kg is a competition featured at the 2011 World Taekwondo Olympic Qualification Tournament, and was held at the Sarhadchi Olympic Center in Baku, Azerbaijan on July 1. The first three ranked athletes qualify their NOCs a place each at the 2012 Olympic Games.

== Results ==
Legend

- DQ — Won by disqualification

=== Finals ===
Final
Gwladys Épangue (FRA)	1
An Sae-bom (KOR)	0

3rd place
Anastasia Baryshnikova (RUS)	1
Nur Tatar (TUR)	0

=== Top half ===
Round of 32
Feruza Yergeshova (KAZ)	5
Edines Kurtovic (AUT)	8

Round of 16
Gwladys Épangue (FRA)	9
Edines Kurtovic (AUT)	1
Nuša Rajher (SLO)	DQ
~~Linda Azzeddine (ALG)~~
Wiam Dislam (MAR)	7
Iwona Kosiorek (POL)	3
Deysy Montes de Oca (DOM)	5
Anastasia Baryshnikova (RUS)	10

Quarterfinals
Gwladys Épangue (FRA)	9
Nuša Rajher (SLO)	1
Wiam Dislam (MAR)	0
Anastasia Baryshnikova (RUS)	1

Semifinals
Gwladys Épangue (FRA)	3
Anastasia Baryshnikova (RUS)	1

=== Bottom half ===
Round of 32
Sandra Vanegas (COL)	1
Daniela Castrignano (ITA)	0
Milica Mandić (SRB)	3
Karolina Kedzierska (SWE)	0

Round of 16
Rosana Simón (ESP)	3
Sandra Vanegas (COL)	0
Nur Tatar (TUR)	12
Inaas Hagar (SUD)	0
Evgeniya Karimova (UZB)	1
An Sae-bom (KOR)	2
Milica Mandić (SRB)	0
María Espinoza (MEX)	1

Quarterfinals
Rosana Simón (ESP)	1
Nur Tatar (TUR)	5
An Sae-bom (KOR)	9
María Espinoza (MEX)	3

Semifinals
Nur Tatar (TUR)	2
An Sae-bom (KOR)	4
