= Taekwondo at the 2020 Summer Olympics – Women's +67 kg =

Taekwondo competition

Women's +67 kg at the Games of the XXXII Olympiad
- Venue: Makuhari Messe
- Date: 27 July 2021

Medalists
1st place, gold medalist(s)		Milica Mandić	Serbia
2nd place, silver medalist(s)		Lee Da-bin	South Korea
3rd place, bronze medalist(s)		Althéa Laurin	France
3rd place, bronze medalist(s)		Bianca Walkden	Great Britain

The women's +67 kg competition in Taekwondo at the 2020 Summer Olympics was held on 27 July 2021, at the Makuhari Messe Hall A.

== Results ==
=== Main bracket ===
Preliminary round
14	Katherine Rodríguez (DOM)	7
4	Nafia Kuş (TUR)	5
5	Lee Da-bin (KOR)	17
13	Aminata Traoré (CIV)	13
9	Svetlana Osipova (UZB)	9
8	Cansel Deniz (KAZ)	10
1	Bianca Walkden (GBR)	WO
11	Reshmie Oogink (NED)	DNS
16	Keyla Ávila (HON)	1
2	Zheng Shuyin (CHN)	20
7	Briseida Acosta (MEX)	3
10	Althéa Laurin (FRA)	21
12	Reba Stewart (AUS)	2
6	Aleksandra Kowalczuk (POL)	7
3	Milica Mandić (SRB)	13
15	Faith Ogallo (KEN)	0

Quarterfinals
14	Katherine Rodríguez (DOM)	14
5	Lee Da-bin (KOR)	23
8	Cansel Deniz (KAZ)	7
1	Bianca Walkden (GBR)	17
2	Zheng Shuyin (CHN)	6
10	Althéa Laurin (FRA)	14
6	Aleksandra Kowalczuk (POL)	4
3	Milica Mandić (SRB)	11

Semifinals
5	Lee Da-bin (KOR)	25
1	Bianca Walkden (GBR)	24
10	Althéa Laurin (FRA)	5
3	Milica Mandić (SRB)	7

Gold medal match
5	Lee Da-bin (KOR)	7
3	Milica Mandić (SRB)	10

Athletes who returned positive COVID-19 tests at Tokyo 2020 appear with DNS (did not start).

=== Repechage ===
Repechage			Bronze Medal
			10	Althéa Laurin (FRA)	17
			14	Aminata Traoré (CIV)	8
14	Aminata Traoré (CIV)	11	14	Aminata Traoré (CIV)	8
13	Katherine Rodríguez (DOM)	9

Repechage			Bronze Medal
			1	Bianca Walkden (GBR)	7
			6	Aleksandra Kowalczuk (POL)	3
15	Faith Ogallo (KEN)	7	6	Aleksandra Kowalczuk (POL)	3
6	Aleksandra Kowalczuk (POL)	15
