= Taekwondo at the 2016 Summer Olympics – Women's +67 kg =

Taekwondo competition

Women's +67kg at the Games of the XXXI Olympiad
- Venue: Carioca Arena 3
- Date: 20 August 2016
- Competitors: 16 from 16 nations

Medalists
1st place, gold medalist(s)		Zheng Shuyin	China
2nd place, silver medalist(s)		María Espinoza	Mexico
3rd place, bronze medalist(s)		Bianca Walkden	Great Britain
3rd place, bronze medalist(s)		Jackie Galloway	United States

The women's +67 kg competition at the 2016 Summer Olympics was held on 20 August, at the Carioca Arena 3.

The medals for the competition were presented by Nicole Hoevertsz, Aruba, IOC member and the gifts were presented by Mr. Choi Ji Ho, Council Member of the World Taekwondo Federation.

== Competition format ==
The main bracket consisted of a single elimination tournament, culminating in the gold medal match. The top eight athletes in each event were seeded so as not to face each other in the preliminary round. The remainder of the qualified athletes were drawn randomly on 15 August 2016. Two bronze medals were awarded at the Taekwondo competitions. A repechage was used to determine the bronze medal winners. Every competitor who lost to one of the two finalists competed in the repechage, another single-elimination competition. Each semifinal loser faced the last remaining repechage competitor from the opposite half of the bracket in a bronze medal match.

== Schedule ==
All times are in local time (UTC-3).

Date	Time	Round
Saturday, 20 August 2016	09:00; 15:00; 17:00; 20:00; 21:00; 22:00	Preliminary round Quarterfinals; Semifinals; Repechage; Bronze medal matches Final

== Seeds ==
Every practitioner was seeded at the event. Practitioners representing the hosting nation were seeded as no. 4 regardless of their current world ranking.

1. María Espinoza (MEX)
2. Zheng Shuyin (CHN)
3. Bianca Walkden (GBR)
4. Jackie Galloway (USA)
5. Reshmie Oogink (NED)
6. Milica Mandić (SRB)
7. Gwladys Épangue (FRA)
8. Katherine Rodríguez (DOM)
9. Wiam Dislam (MAR)
10. Mamina Koné (CIV)
11. Tina Skaar (NOR)
12. Sorn Seavmey (CAM)
13. Crystal Weekes (PUR)
14. Samantha Kassman (PNG)
15. Nisha Rawal (NEP)
16. Kirstie Alora (PHI)

== Results ==
Legend

- PTG – Won by points gap
- SUD – Won by sudden death
- SUP – Won by superiority

=== Main bracket ===
Preliminary round
13	Crystal Weekes (PUR)	0
4	Jackie Galloway (USA)	5
5	Reshmie Oogink (NED)	7
12	Sorn Seavmey (CAM)	1
9	Wiam Dislam (MAR)	5
8	Katherine Rodríguez (DOM)	1
1	María Espinoza (MEX)	4
16	Kirstie Alora (PHI)	1
15	Nisha Rawal (NEP)	0
2	Zheng Shuyin (CHN)	2
7	Gwladys Épangue (FRA)	3
10	Mamina Koné (CIV)	1
11	Tina Skaar (NOR)	2
6	Milica Mandić (SRB)	8
3	Bianca Walkden (GBR)	14 (PTG)
14	Samantha Kassman (PNG)	1

Quarterfinals
4	Jackie Galloway (USA)	1 (SUP)
5	Reshmie Oogink (NED)	1
9	Wiam Dislam (MAR)	2
1	María Espinoza (MEX)	3 (SUD)
2	Zheng Shuyin (CHN)	4
7	Gwladys Épangue (FRA)	1
6	Milica Mandić (SRB)	0
3	Bianca Walkden (GBR)	5

Semifinals
4	Jackie Galloway (USA)	0
1	María Espinoza (MEX)	0 (SUP)
2	Zheng Shuyin (CHN)	4 (SUD)
3	Bianca Walkden (GBR)	1

Gold medal match
1	María Espinoza (MEX)	1
2	Zheng Shuyin (CHN)	5

=== Repechage ===
Repechage
Kirstie Alora (PHI)	5
Wiam Dislam (MAR)	7
Nisha Rawal (NEP)	3
Gwladys Épangue (FRA)	4

Bronze medal matches
Bianca Walkden (GBR)	7
Wiam Dislam (MAR)	1
Gwladys Épangue (FRA)	1
Jackie Galloway (USA)	2
