= 2017 World Taekwondo Championships – Women's middleweight =

Taekwondo World competition

Women's middleweight at the 2017 World Championships
- Venue: Taekwondowon
- Dates: 28–29 June 2017
- Competitors: 40 from 40 nations

Medalists
gold medal	Milica Mandić	Serbia
silver medal	Oh Hye-ri	South Korea
bronze medal	María Espinoza	Mexico
bronze medal	Reshmie Oogink	Netherlands

The women's middleweight is a competition featured at the 2017 World Taekwondo Championships, and was held at the Taekwondowon in Muju County, South Korea on June 28 and June 29. Middleweights were limited to a maximum of 73 kilograms in body mass.

== Results ==
Legend

- DQ — Won by disqualification
- P — Won by punitive declaration

=== Finals ===
Semifinals		Final
María Espinoza (MEX)	6
Oh Hye-ri (KOR)	15	Oh Hye-ri (KOR)	13
Reshmie Oogink (NED)	3	Milica Mandić (SRB)	17
Milica Mandić (SRB)	6

=== Top half ===
==== Section 1 ====
Round of 64
Souzanna Tomazou (CYP)	6
Mokhru Khalimova (TJK)	2
Franka Anić (SLO)	14
Emily Stellino (AUS)	7

Round of 32
María Espinoza (MEX)	9
Souzanna Tomazou (CYP)	2
Jade Slavin (GBR)	20
Tina Røe Skaar (NOR)	9
Aleksandra Krzemieniecka (POL)	15
Carolina Fernández (VEN)	2
Franka Anić (SLO)	8
Karina Zhdanova (RUS)	9

Round of 16
María Espinoza (MEX)	6
Jade Slavin (GBR)	4
Aleksandra Krzemieniecka (POL)	6
Karina Zhdanova (RUS)	9

Quarterfinals
María Espinoza (MEX)	16
Karina Zhdanova (RUS)	12

==== Section 2 ====
Round of 64
Venice Traill (FIJ)	0
Maristella Smiraglia (ITA)	42
Chen Yann-yeu (TPE)	8
Taylor Shaw (NZL)	1

Round of 32
Yanna Schneider (GER)	9
Maristella Smiraglia (ITA)	10
Nathalie Iliesco (CAN)	13
Mamina Koné (CIV)	8
Maisoun Farouk (EGY)	6
Sorn Seavmey (CAM)	9
Chen Yann-yeu (TPE)	10
Oh Hye-ri (KOR)	13

Round of 16
Maristella Smiraglia (ITA)	4
Nathalie Iliesco (CAN)	1
Sorn Seavmey (CAM)	9
Oh Hye-ri (KOR)	18

Quarterfinals
Maristella Smiraglia (ITA)	13
Oh Hye-ri (KOR)	18

=== Bottom half ===
==== Section 3 ====
Round of 64
Iris Carvallo (ECU)	9
Marina Dimitropoulou (GRE)	26
Cecilia Castro (ESP)	16^{P}
Aishwarya Ravade (IND)	1

Round of 32
Iva Radoš (CRO)	14
Marina Dimitropoulou (GRE)	1
Crystal Weekes (PUR)	20
Madelynn Gorman-Shore (USA)	19
Zahra Pouresmaeil (IRI)	8
Sandra Vanegas (COL)	3
Cecilia Castro (ESP)	4
Reshmie Oogink (NED)	12

Round of 16
Iva Radoš (CRO)	14
Crystal Weekes (PUR)	3
Zahra Pouresmaeil (IRI)	2
Reshmie Oogink (NED)	15

Quarterfinals
Iva Radoš (CRO)	10
Reshmie Oogink (NED)	20

==== Section 4 ====
Round of 64
Gao Pan (CHN)	20
Kirstie Alora (PHI)	5
Glenhis Hernández (CUB)	DQ
~~Ariana Santos (CPV)~~

Round of 32
Petra Matijašević (MKD)	15
Gao Pan (CHN)	9
Estelle Vander-Zwalm (FRA)	20
Raphaella Galacho (BRA)	10
Sude Bulut (TUR)	13
Cansel Deniz (KAZ)	10
Glenhis Hernández (CUB)	5
Milica Mandić (SRB)	6

Round of 16
Petra Matijašević (MKD)	19
Estelle Vander-Zwalm (FRA)	18
Sude Bulut (TUR)	3
Milica Mandić (SRB)	5

Quarterfinals
Petra Matijašević (MKD)	8
Milica Mandić (SRB)	9
