= Taekwondo at the 2010 Summer Youth Olympics – Girls' +63 kg =

Taekwondo competition

The girls' over 63 kg competition in taekwondo at the 2010 Summer Youth Olympics in Singapore took place on August 19. A total of 9 women competed in this event, limited to fighters whose body weight was greater than 63 kilograms. Preliminaries started at 14:00, quarterfinals started at 15:22, semifinals at 18:30 and the final at 19:53. Two bronze medals were awarded at the Taekwondo competitions.

== Medalists ==
| Gold | Zheng Shuyin; China |
| Silver | Briseida Acosta; Mexico |
| Bronze | Yuleimi Abreu; Cuba |
| Bronze | Faiza Taoussara; France |

== Results ==
Legend

- PTG — Won by Points Gap
- SUP — Won by Superiority
- RSC - Won by Referee Stop Contest

=== Main bracket ===
First round
Hulita Matekuolava (TGA)
Olga Ivanova (RUS) | RSC

Quarterfinals
Briseida Acosta (MEX) | 12 PTF
Olga Ivanova (RUS) | 7
Jo-Wei Lin (TPE) | 3
Faiza Taoussara (FRA) | 4 PTF
Zheng Shuyin (CHN) | 1 PTF
Adrienne Ivey (USA) | 0
Yuleimi Abreu (CUB) | RSC
Dasreen Primus (VIN)

Semifinals
Briseida Acosta (MEX) | 7 SUP
Faiza Taoussara (FRA) | 7
Zheng Shuyin (CHN) | 8 PTF
Yuleimi Abreu (CUB) | 2

Final
Briseida Acosta (MEX) | 1
Zheng Shuyin (CHN) | 2 PTF
