= 2011 World Taekwondo Olympic Qualification Tournament =

Taekwondo competition

World Qualification Tournament
| Men | Women |
| 58 kg | 49 kg |
| 68 kg | 57 kg |
| 80 kg | 67 kg |
| +80 kg | +67 kg |

The 2011 World Taekwondo Olympic Qualification Tournament for the London Olympic Games was held at the Sarhadchi Olympic Center in Baku, Azerbaijan from June 30 to July 3, 2011. Each country may enter maximum 2 male and 2 female divisions with only one in each division and the first three ranked athletes per weight division qualify their NOCs a place each for Olympic Games. Total twenty four athletes qualify their NOCs a place each for Olympic Games through WTF World Qualification Tournament. A total of 332 athletes, 186 males and 146 females, from 108 nations took part in the tournament.

== Medalists ==
=== Men ===
| Event | Gold | Silver | Bronze |
|---|---|---|---|
| −58 kg | Pen-ek Karaket; Thailand | Gabriel Mercedes; Dominican Republic | Lee Dae-hoon; South Korea |
| −68 kg | Servet Tazegül; Turkey | Mohammad Bagheri Motamed; Iran | Diogo Silva; Brazil |
| −80 kg | Ramin Azizov; Azerbaijan | Yousef Karami; Iran | Mauro Sarmiento; Italy |
| +80 kg | Cha Dong-min; South Korea | Gadzhi Umarov; Russia | Alexandros Nikolaidis; Greece |

=== Women ===
| Event | Gold | Silver | Bronze |
|---|---|---|---|
| −49 kg | Wu Jingyu; China | Lucija Zaninović; Croatia | Yang Shu-chun; Chinese Taipei |
| −57 kg | Tseng Pei-hua; Chinese Taipei | Hou Yuzhuo; China | Ana Zaninović; Croatia |
| −67 kg | Kim Mi-kyung; South Korea | Farida Azizova; Azerbaijan | Elin Johansson; Sweden |
| +67 kg | Gwladys Épangue; France | An Sae-bom; South Korea | Anastasia Baryshnikova; Russia |

== Qualification summary ==
| NOC | Men | | | | Women | | | | Total |
| NOC | −58 kg | −68 kg | −80 kg | +80 kg | −49 kg | −57 kg | −67 kg | +67 kg | Total |
|---|---|---|---|---|---|---|---|---|---|
| Azerbaijan | | | X | | | | X | | 2 |
| Brazil | | X | | | | | | | 1 |
| China | | | | | X | X | | | 2 |
| Chinese Taipei | | | | | X | X | | | 2 |
| Croatia | | | | | X | X | | | 2 |
| Dominican Republic | X | | | | | | | | 1 |
| France | | | | | | | | X | 1 |
| Greece | | | | X | | | | | 1 |
| Iran | | X | X | | | | | | 2 |
| Italy | | | X | | | | | | 1 |
| Russia | | | | X | | | | X | 2 |
| South Korea | X | | | X | | | X | X | 4 |
| Sweden | | | | | | | X | | 1 |
| Thailand | X | | | | | | | | 1 |
| Turkey | | X | | | | | | | 1 |
| Total: 15 NOCs | 3 | 3 | 3 | 3 | 3 | 3 | 3 | 3 | 24 |
