= 2017 World Taekwondo Grand Prix =

Taekwondo competition

The 2017 World Taekwondo Grand Prix was the 5th edition of the World Taekwondo Grand Prix series.

== Schedule ==
Event	Date	Venue	Ref.
Series 1	August 4–6	Moscow, Russia	
Series 2	September 22–24	Rabat, Morocco	
Series 3	October 20–22	London, United Kingdom	
Final	December 2–3	Abidjan, Ivory Coast	

== Men ==
=== 58 kg ===
Event	Gold	Silver	Bronze
Moscow	Kim Tae-hun (KOR)	Ramnarong Sawekwiharee (THA)	Mohammad Kazemi (IRI)
Moscow	Kim Tae-hun (KOR)	Ramnarong Sawekwiharee (THA)	Jesús Tortosa (ESP)
Rabat	Kim Tae-hun (KOR)	Carlos Navarro (MEX)	Jesús Tortosa (ESP)
Rabat	Kim Tae-hun (KOR)	Carlos Navarro (MEX)	Farzan Ashourzadeh (IRI)
London	Mikhail Artamonov (RUS)	Armin Hadipour (IRI)	Jesús Tortosa (ESP)
London	Mikhail Artamonov (RUS)	Armin Hadipour (IRI)	Tawin Hanprab (THA)
Abidjan	Kim Tae-hun (KOR)	Farzan Ashourzadeh (IRI)	Jesús Tortosa (ESP)

=== 68 kg ===
Event	Gold	Silver	Bronze
Moscow	Lee Dae-hoon (KOR)	Aleksey Denisenko (RUS)	Ahmad Abughaush (JOR)
Moscow	Lee Dae-hoon (KOR)	Aleksey Denisenko (RUS)	Christian McNeish (GBR)
Rabat	Lee Dae-hoon (KOR)	Huang Yu-jen (TPE)	Javier Pérez (ESP)
Rabat	Lee Dae-hoon (KOR)	Huang Yu-jen (TPE)	Saúl Gutiérrez (MEX)
London	Ahmad Abughaush (JOR)	Bradly Sinden (GBR)	Aleksey Denisenko (RUS)
London	Ahmad Abughaush (JOR)	Bradly Sinden (GBR)	Joel González (ESP)
Abidjan	Lee Dae-hoon (KOR)	Aleksey Denisenko (RUS)	Huang Yu-jen (TPE)

=== 80 kg ===
Event	Gold	Silver	Bronze
Moscow	Anton Kotkov (RUS)	Aaron Cook (MDA)	Cheick Sallah Cissé (CIV)
Moscow	Anton Kotkov (RUS)	Aaron Cook (MDA)	Kim Hun (KOR)
Rabat	Cheick Sallah Cissé (CIV)	Seif Eissa (EGY)	Milad Beigi (AZE)
Rabat	Cheick Sallah Cissé (CIV)	Seif Eissa (EGY)	René Lizárraga (MEX)
London	Cheick Sallah Cissé (CIV)	Maksim Khramtsov (RUS)	Aaron Cook (MDA)
London	Cheick Sallah Cissé (CIV)	Maksim Khramtsov (RUS)	Raúl Martínez (ESP)
Abidjan	Cheick Sallah Cissé (CIV)	Maksim Khramtsov (RUS)	Nikita Rafalovich (UZB)

=== +80 kg ===
Event	Gold	Silver	Bronze
Moscow	Roman Kuznetsov (RUS)	In Kyo-don (KOR)	Yury Kirichenko (RUS)
Moscow	Roman Kuznetsov (RUS)	In Kyo-don (KOR)	Vedran Golec (CRO)
Rabat	Mahama Cho (GBR)	Roman Kuznetsov (RUS)	In Kyo-don (KOR)
Rabat	Mahama Cho (GBR)	Roman Kuznetsov (RUS)	Ivan Trajkovič (SLO)
London	In Kyo-don (KOR)	Rafail Aiukaev (RUS)	Mahama Cho (GBR)
London	In Kyo-don (KOR)	Rafail Aiukaev (RUS)	Sajjad Mardani (IRI)
Abidjan	Vladislav Larin (RUS)	In Kyo-don (KOR)	Abdoul Razak Issoufou (NIG)

== Women ==
=== 49 kg ===
Event	Gold	Silver	Bronze
Moscow	Panipak Wongpattanakit (THA)	Kim So-hui (KOR)	Camila Rodríguez (COL)
Moscow	Panipak Wongpattanakit (THA)	Kim So-hui (KOR)	Tijana Bogdanović (SRB)
Rabat	Kim So-hui (KOR)	Trương Thị Kim Tuyến (VIE)	Sim Jae-young (KOR)
Rabat	Kim So-hui (KOR)	Trương Thị Kim Tuyến (VIE)	Rukiye Yıldırım (TUR)
London	Panipak Wongpattanakit (THA)	Tijana Bogdanović (SRB)	Iris Sing (BRA)
London	Panipak Wongpattanakit (THA)	Tijana Bogdanović (SRB)	Rukiye Yıldırım (TUR)
Abidjan	Panipak Wongpattanakit (THA)	Kim So-hui (KOR)	Trương Thị Kim Tuyến (VIE)

=== 57 kg ===
Event	Gold	Silver	Bronze
Moscow	Lee Ah-reum (KOR)	Kim So-hee (KOR)	Carolena Carstens (PAN)
Moscow	Lee Ah-reum (KOR)	Kim So-hee (KOR)	Raheleh Asemani (BEL)
Rabat	Hatice Kübra İlgün (TUR)	Jade Jones (GBR)	Lee Ah-reum (KOR)
Rabat	Hatice Kübra İlgün (TUR)	Jade Jones (GBR)	Marija Štetić (CRO)
London	Jade Jones (GBR)	Lee Ah-reum (KOR)	Tatiana Kudashova (RUS)
London	Jade Jones (GBR)	Lee Ah-reum (KOR)	Patrycja Adamkiewicz (POL)
Abidjan	Jade Jones (GBR)	Marta Calvo (ESP)	Tatiana Kudashova (RUS)

=== 67 kg ===
Event	Gold	Silver	Bronze
Moscow	Ruth Gbagbi (CIV)	Nur Tatar (TUR)	Oh Hye-ri (KOR)
Moscow	Ruth Gbagbi (CIV)	Nur Tatar (TUR)	Paige McPherson (USA)
Rabat	Nur Tatar (TUR)	Oh Hye-ri (KOR)	Ruth Gbagbi (CIV)
Rabat	Nur Tatar (TUR)	Oh Hye-ri (KOR)	İrem Yaman (TUR)
London	Lauren Williams (GBR)	Ruth Gbagbi (CIV)	Paige McPherson (USA)
London	Lauren Williams (GBR)	Ruth Gbagbi (CIV)	Matea Jelić (CRO)
Abidjan	Guo Yunfei (CHN)	Oh Hye-ri (KOR)	Ruth Gbagbi (CIV)

=== +67 kg ===
Event	Gold	Silver	Bronze
Moscow	Bianca Walkden (GBR)	Kim Bich-na (KOR)	Olga Ivanova (RUS)
Moscow	Bianca Walkden (GBR)	Kim Bich-na (KOR)	Lee Da-bin (KOR)
Rabat	Bianca Walkden (GBR)	Milica Mandić (SRB)	An Sae-bom (KOR)
Rabat	Bianca Walkden (GBR)	Milica Mandić (SRB)	Zheng Shuyin (CHN)
London	Bianca Walkden (GBR)	Aleksandra Kowalczuk (POL)	Lee Da-bin (KOR)
London	Bianca Walkden (GBR)	Aleksandra Kowalczuk (POL)	Briseida Acosta (MEX)
Abidjan	Bianca Walkden (GBR)	Lee Da-bin (KOR)	Zheng Shuyin (CHN)

== Medal table ==
Rank	Nation	Gold	Silver	Bronze	Total
1	South Korea (KOR)	9	10	8	27
2	Great Britain (GBR)	8	2	2	12
3	Russia (RUS)	4	6	5	15
4	Ivory Coast (CIV)	4	1	3	8
5	Thailand (THA)	3	1	1	5
6	Turkey (TUR)	2	1	3	6
7	China (CHN)	1	0	2	3
8	Jordan (JOR)	1	0	1	2
9	Iran (IRI)	0	2	3	5
10	Serbia (SRB)	0	2	1	3
11	Spain (ESP)	0	1	7	8
12	Mexico (MEX)	0	1	3	4
13	Chinese Taipei (TPE)	0	1	1	2
13	Moldova (MDA)	0	1	1	2
13	Poland (POL)	0	1	1	2
13	Vietnam (VIE)	0	1	1	2
17	Egypt (EGY)	0	1	0	1
18	Croatia (CRO)	0	0	3	3
19	United States (USA)	0	0	2	2
20	Azerbaijan (AZE)	0	0	1	1
20	Belgium (BEL)	0	0	1	1
20	Brazil (BRA)	0	0	1	1
20	Colombia (COL)	0	0	1	1
20	Niger (NIG)	0	0	1	1
20	Panama (PAN)	0	0	1	1
20	Slovenia (SLO)	0	0	1	1
20	Uzbekistan (UZB)	0	0	1	1
Totals (27 entries)		32	32	56	120
