= 2011 World Taekwondo Olympic Qualification Tournament – Men's +80 kg =

Taekwondo competition

World Qualification Tournament
| Men | Women |
| 58 kg | 49 kg |
| 68 kg | 57 kg |
| 80 kg | 67 kg |
| +80 kg | +67 kg |

The Men's +80 kg is a competition featured at the 2011 World Taekwondo Olympic Qualification Tournament, and was held at the Sarhadchi Olympic Center in Baku, Azerbaijan on July 3. The first three ranked athletes qualify their NOCs a place each at the 2012 Olympic Games.

== Results ==
Legend

- WD — Won by withdrawal

=== Finals ===
| Final |
| Cha Dong-min (KOR) | 6 |
| Gadzhi Umarov (RUS) | 1 |

| 3rd place |
| Alexandros Nikolaidis (GRE) | 1 |
| Liu Xiaobo (CHN) | 0 |

=== Top half ===
Round of 32
Alexandros Nikolaidis (GRE) | 4
Ulvi Kaya (GER) | 2
Sandeep Kundu (IND) | 2
Chika Chukwumerije (NGR) | 8
Christoph Decker (AUT) | 8
Dominik Urich (CZE) | 2
Firmin Zokou (CIV) | 10
Elias El-Hidari (LIB) | 7
Wisam Sattar (IRQ) | 0
Zakaria Asidah (DEN) | 4

Round of 16
François Coulombe-Fortier (CAN) | 3
Alexandros Nikolaidis (GRE) | 5
Chika Chukwumerije (NGR) | 7
Christoph Decker (AUT) | 2
Cha Dong-min (KOR) | 12
Firmin Zokou (CIV) | 1
Zakaria Asidah (DEN) | 5
Akmal Irgashev (UZB) | 3

Quarterfinals
Alexandros Nikolaidis (GRE) | WD
Chika Chukwumerije (NGR)
Cha Dong-min (KOR) | 7
Zakaria Asidah (DEN) | 1

Semifinals
Alexandros Nikolaidis (GRE) | 1
Cha Dong-min (KOR) | 5

=== Bottom half ===
Round of 32
Liu Xiaobo (CHN) | 6
Vitoldas Dzikevič (LTU) | 1
Teemu Heino (FIN) | 6
Anthony Obame (GAB) | 7
Abdulqader Al-Adhami (QAT) | 4
Mickaël Borot (FRA) | 5
Vanja Babić (SRB) | 13
Denis Bernad Kashumba (TAN) | 0
Pita Taufatofua (TGA) | 2
Balázs Tóth (HUN) | 4
Andreas Stylianou (CYP) | 1
Gadzhi Umarov (RUS) | 10

Round of 16
Arman Chilmanov (KAZ) | 3
Liu Xiaobo (CHN) | 5
Anthony Obame (GAB) | 7
Mickaël Borot (FRA) | 8
Vanja Babić (SRB) | 7
Balázs Tóth (HUN) | 6
Gadzhi Umarov (RUS) | 11
Carlo Molfetta (ITA) | 10

Quarterfinals
Liu Xiaobo (CHN) | 6
Mickaël Borot (FRA) | 5
Vanja Babić (SRB) | 1
Gadzhi Umarov (RUS) | 5

Semifinals
Liu Xiaobo (CHN) | 7
Gadzhi Umarov (RUS) | 10
