= 2009 World Taekwondo Championships – Women's middleweight =

Taekwondo competition

Women's middleweight at the 2009 World Championships
- Venue: Ballerup Super Arena
- Dates: 17 October 2009
- Competitors: 34 from 34 nations

Medalists
gold medal	Han Yingying	China
silver medal	Lee In-jong	South Korea
bronze medal	Furkan Asena Aydın	Turkey
bronze medal	Anastasia Baryshnikova	Russia

The women's middleweight competition was the lightest class featured at the 2009 World Taekwondo Championships, and was held at the Ballerup Super Arena in Copenhagen, Denmark on October 17. Finweights were limited to a maximum of 73 kilograms in body mass.

== Results ==
Legend

- DQ — Won by disqualification

=== Finals ===
Semifinals		Final
Lee In-jong (KOR)	4
Furkan Asena Aydın (TUR)	0	Lee In-jong (KOR)	3
Anastasia Baryshnikova (RUS)	4	Han Yingying (CHN)	5
Han Yingying (CHN)	6

=== Top half ===
==== Section 1 ====
Round of 64
Evanyelis Ocasio (PUR)	1
Noélie Ouédraogo (BUR)	2

Round of 32
María Espinoza (MEX)	6
Noélie Ouédraogo (BUR)	1
Flora Lellouche (FRA)	0
Lee In-jong (KOR)	14
Andrijana Ćirić (SRB)	4
Feruza Yergeshova (KAZ)	7
~~Mariama Dalanda Barry (GUI)~~
Kirstie Alora (PHI)	DQ

Round of 16
María Espinoza (MEX)	1
Lee In-jong (KOR)	3
Feruza Yergeshova (KAZ)	1
Kirstie Alora (PHI)	3

Quarterfinals
Lee In-jong (KOR)	7
Kisrtie Alora (PHI)	0

==== Section 2 ====
Round of 64

Round of 32
Furkan Asena Aydın (TUR)	6
Mirna Hechavarria (CUB)	0
Charikeia Livera (CYP)	10
Tneal McKay-Wilson (NZL)	0
Catur Yuni Riyaningsih (INA)	1
Chuang Chia-chia (TPE)	12
Andromachi Georgiadou (GRE)	4
Sandra Lorenzo (ESP)	10

Round of 16
Furkan Asena Aydın (TUR)	13
Charikeia Livera (CYP)	1
Chuang Chia-chia (TPE)	4
Sandra Lorenzo (ESP)	2

Quarterfinals
Furkan Asena Aydın (TUR)	12
Chuang Chia-chia (TPE)	1

=== Bottom half ===
==== Section 3 ====
Round of 64

Round of 32
Anastasia Baryshnikova (RUS)	10
Aura Páez (VEN)	0
Anna Grabko (UKR)	2
Nuša Rajher (SLO)	3
Chrystelle Naami Yang (CMR)	5
Keltoum Hadj (ALG)	2
Rachel Wilsson (SWE)	1
Courtney Condie (CAN)	8

Round of 16
Anastasia Baryshnikova (RUS)	11
Nuša Rajher (SLO)	4
Chrystelle Naami Yang (CMR)	4
Courtney Condie (CAN)	2

Quarterfinals
Anastasia Baryshnikova (RUS)	9
Chrystelle Naami Yang (CMR)	3

==== Section 4 ====
Round of 64
~~Hà Thị Nguyên (VIE)~~
Dalia Avivi (USA)	DQ

Round of 32
Aminata Doumbia (MLI)	0
Amy Ash (AUS)	1
Sandra Vanegas (COL)	0
Helloraine Paiva (BRA)	2
Han Yingying (CHN)	14
Jacqueline Quek (SIN)	0
Dalia Avivi (USA)	0
Sarah Stevenson (GBR)	5

Round of 16
Amy Ash (AUS)	2
Helloraine Paiva (BRA)	5
Han Yingying (CHN)	4
Sarah Stevenson (GBR)	3

Quarterfinals
Helloraine Paiva (BRA)	0
Han Yingying (CHN)	4
