= Doris Pole =

Croatian taekwondo practitioner

Personal information
- Nationality: Croatian
- Born: 4 June 1998 (age 28)

Sport
- Sport: Taekwondo
Medal record
Representing Croatia
Women's taekwondo
World Championships
Bronze medal – third place	2019 Manchester	Heavyweight

Doris Pole (born 4 June 1998) is a Croatian taekwondo practitioner.

She won a bronze medal in heavyweight at the 2019 World Taekwondo Championships, after being defeated by Zheng Shuyin in the semifinal.
