= 2011 World Taekwondo Olympic Qualification Tournament – Women's 57 kg =

Taekwondo competition

World Qualification Tournament
Men	Women
58 kg	49 kg
68 kg	57 kg
80 kg	67 kg
+80 kg	+67 kg

The Women's 57 kg is a competition featured at the 2011 World Taekwondo Olympic Qualification Tournament, and was held at the Sarhadchi Olympic Center in Baku, Azerbaijan on July 3. The first three ranked athletes qualify their NOCs a place each at the 2012 Olympic Games.

== Results ==
Legend

- DQ — Won by disqualification

=== Finals ===
Semifinals
Hou Yuzhuo (CHN)	6
Ana Zaninović (CRO)	5
Mayu Hamada (JPN)	2
Tseng Pei-hua (TPE)	11

Final
Hou Yuzhuo (CHN)	0
Tseng Pei-hua (TPE)	3
3rd place
Ana Zaninović (CRO)	1
Mayu Hamada (JPN)	0

=== Top half ===
==== Section 1 ====
Round of 64
Sonya McConnell (IRL)	10
Rahma Ben Ali (TUN)	6
Iana Gagnidze (GEO)	0
Margarita Michailidou (GRE)	4
Humaira Mohammadi (AFG)	3
Jade Zafra (PHI)	4

Round of 32
Hou Yuzhuo (CHN)	7
Sonya McConnell (IRL)	4
~~Sephora Baelenge (COD)~~
Mona Solheim (NOR)	DQ
Shahd Al-Tarman (JOR)	4
Margarita Michailidou (GRE)	8
Jade Zafra (PHI)	4
Laura Vásquez (ESA)	9

Round of 16
Hou Yuzhuo (CHN)	7
Mona Solheim (NOR)	2
Margarita Michailidou (GRE)	7
Laura Vásquez (ESA)	3

Quarterfinals
Hou Yuzhuo (CHN)	6
Margarita Michailidou (GRE)	1

==== Section 2 ====
Round of 64
Marlène Harnois (FRA)	9
Rangsiya Nisaisom (THA)	3
Filka Atanasova (BUL)	2
Andrea Paoli (LIB)	11
Latika Bhandari (IND)	5
Suvi Mikkonen (FIN)	9
Euda Carías (GUA)	4
Tanja Tanacković (SRB)	5

Round of 32
Bineta Diédhiou (SEN)	6
Marlène Harnois (FRA)	10
Andrea Paoli (LIB)	5
Gunay Aghakishiyeva (AZE)	3
Katherine Reyes (VEN)	4
Suvi Mikkonen (FIN)	10
Tanja Tanacković (SRB)	2
Ana Zaninović (CRO)	9

Round of 16
Marlène Harnois (FRA)	2
Andrea Paoli (LIB)	3
Suvi Mikkonen (FIN)	3
Ana Zaninović (CRO)	6

Quarterfinals
Andrea Paoli (LIB)	7
Ana Zaninović (CRO)	15

=== Bottom half ===
==== Section 3 ====
Round of 64
~~Malina Mihaila (ROU)~~
Lia Karina Mansur (INA)	DQ
Mayu Hamada (JPN)	8
Nguyễn Thị Đường (VIE)	6
Aminata Traoré (MLI)	1
Doris Patiño (COL)	9

Round of 32
Bat-El Gatterer (ISR)	9
Lia Karina Mansur (INA)	3
Darya Zubovich (BLR)	8
Samiya Naz (PAK)	0
Robin Cheong (NZL)	0
Mayu Hamada (JPN)	12
Doris Patiño (COL)	1
Hatice Kübra Yangın (TUR)	0

Round of 16
Bat-El Gatterer (ISR)	6
Darya Zubovich (BLR)	4
Mayu Hamada (JPN)	1
Doris Patiño (COL)	0

Quarterfinals
Bat-El Gatterer (ISR)	5
Mayu Hamada (JPN)	7

==== Section 4 ====
Round of 64
Banassa Diomandé (CIV)	1
Yeny Contreras (CHI)	3
Christina Carstens (PAN)	3
Manuela Bezzola (SUI)	5
Edina Kotsis (HUN)	13
Zina Kareem (IRQ)	0

Round of 32
Sousan Hajipour (IRI)	4
Yeny Contreras (CHI)	2
Manuela Bezzola (SUI)	0
Deborah Louz (NED)	1
Caroline Marton (AUS)	1
Diana López (USA)	5
Edina Kotsis (HUN)	1
Tseng Pei-hua (TPE)	10

Round of 16
Sousan Hajipour (IRI)	4
Deborah Louz (NED)	5
Diana López (USA)	1
Tseng Pei-hua (TPE)	3

Quarterfinals
Deborah Louz (NED)	1
Tseng Pei-hua (TPE)	5
