= 2012 European Taekwondo Championships =

Taekwondo competition

- Venue: Sportcity
- Location: Manchester, England
- Start date: 3 May
- End date: 6 May

The 2012 European Taekwondo Championships were held in Manchester, England, from May 3 to May 6, 2012.

== Medal table ==
* Host nation (Great Britain)

| Rank | Nation | Gold | Silver | Bronze | Total |
|---|---|---|---|---|---|
| 1 | France | 3 | 3 | 4 | 10 |
| 2 | Turkey | 3 | 1 | 3 | 7 |
| 3 | Russia | 3 | 1 | 2 | 6 |
| 4 | Great Britain* | 3 | 0 | 4 | 7 |
| 5 | Croatia | 1 | 3 | 2 | 6 |
| 6 | Spain | 1 | 2 | 3 | 6 |
| 7 | Greece | 1 | 1 | 2 | 4 |
| 8 | Italy | 1 | 0 | 1 | 2 |
| 9 | Azerbaijan | 0 | 2 | 0 | 2 |
| 10 | Serbia | 0 | 1 | 1 | 2 |
| 11 | Hungary | 0 | 1 | 0 | 1 |
| 11 | Slovenia | 0 | 1 | 0 | 1 |
| 13 | Germany | 0 | 0 | 3 | 3 |
| 14 | Netherlands | 0 | 0 | 2 | 2 |
| 14 | Poland | 0 | 0 | 2 | 2 |
| 14 | Sweden | 0 | 0 | 2 | 2 |
| 17 | Portugal | 0 | 0 | 1 | 1 |
| Totals (17 entries) | | 16 | 16 | 32 | 64 |

== Medal summary ==
=== Men ===
| Event | Gold | Silver | Bronze |
|---|---|---|---|
| Finweight (−54 kg) | Seyfula Magomedov (RUS) | Mikayil Aliyev (AZE) | Nikolaos Politis (GRE); Amin Badr (GBR) |
| Flyweight (−58 kg) | Joel González Bonilla (ESP) | Moussa Cisse (FRA) | Fırat Pozan (TUR); Eryk Rodzik (POL) |
| −63 kg (bantam) | Michael Harvey (GBR) | Vasileios Gaitanis (GRE) | Tomislav Karaula (CRO); Mario Silva (POR) |
| −68 kg (feather) | Servet Tazegül (TUR) | Filip Grgic (CRO) | Martin Stamper (GBR); Stylianos Papadopoulos (GRE) |
| −74 kg (light) | Aliaskhab Sirazhov (RUS) | Rıdvan Baygut (TUR) | Torann Maizeroi (FRA); Bartosz Kolecki (POL) |
| −80 kg (welter) | Aaron Cook (GBR) | Ramin Azizov (AZE) | Tommy Mollet (NED); Nicolás García (ESP) |
| −87 kg (middle) | Lutalo Muhammad (GBR) | Augustin Bata (FRA) | Ali Sarı (TUR); Carlo Molfetta (ITA) |
| +87 kg (heavy) | Leonardo Basile (ITA) | Ivan Trajkovic (SLO) | Vanja Babić (SRB); Volker Wodzich (GER) |

=== Women ===
| Event | Gold | Silver | Bronze |
|---|---|---|---|
| −46 kg (fin) | Ioanna Koutsou (GRE) | Elaia Torrontegui Ronco (ESP) | Rukiye Yıldırım (TUR); Jessika Alair Soares (SWE) |
| −49 kg (fly) | Lucija Zaninović (CRO) | Kristina Kim (RUS) | Brigitte Yagüe Enrique (ESP); Yasmina Aziez (FRA) |
| −53 kg (bamtam) | Hatice Kübra Yangın (TUR) | Ana Zaninović (CRO) | Caroline Fisher (GBR); Maeiva Coutant (FRA) |
| −57 kg (feather) | Floriane Liborio (FRA) | Edina Kotsis (HUN) | Jade Jones (GBR); Andrea Rica Taboada (ESP) |
| −62 kg (light) | Marlène Harnois (FRA) | Marina Sumić (CRO) | Marina Cheshuina (RUS); Joyce van Baaren (NED) |
| −67 kg (welter) | Nur Tatar (TUR) | Haby Niaré (FRA) | Elin Johansson (SWE); Petra Matijašević (CRO) |
| −73 kg (middle) | Anastasia Baryshnikova (RUS) | Milica Mandić (SRB) | Maéva Mellier (FRA); Melda Akcan (GER) |
| +73 kg (heavy) | Anne-Caroline Graffe (FRA) | Rosana Simón Álamo (ESP) | Olga Ivanova (RUS); Katharina Weiss (GER) |
