= Ana Tepavac =

Serbian taekwondo practitioner

Personal information
- Born: 19 March 1995 (age 31)

Sport
- Country: Serbia
- Sport: Taekwondo
- Event: Heavyweight
- Club: TK Elit
Medal record
World Championships
Bronze medal – third place	2013 Puebla	Heavyweight
European Championships
Bronze medal – third place	2014 Baku	Heavyweight
Mediterranean Games
Gold medal – first place	2018 Tarragona	Heavyweight
Universiade
Gold medal – first place	2017 Taipei	Team Kyorugi
Bronze medal – third place	2015 Gwangju	Welterweight

Ana Tepavac (Serbian: Ана Тепавац; née Bajić / Бајић; born 19 March 1995) is a Serbian taekwondo practitioner. She won a bronze medal at the 2013 World Taekwondo Championships in the heavyweight category. She also won the bronze medal at the 2014 European Championships.

== Career ==
Bajić competed in the women's heavyweight (+73 kg) class at the 2013 World Taekwondo Championships in Mexico. After receiving a walkover in the first round, she won her second round match before defeating Spanish opponent Rosana Simón in the quarter-finals to secure a medal in the event. Bajić progressed no further in the competition however, losing by a 5–2 score at the semi-final stage and finishing with a bronze medal.

Bajić took part in the 2014 European Championships in Baku, Azerbaijan, in May 2014. She won her second senior competition medal, also bronze, by reaching the semi-finals after beating opponents from Germany and France. Bajić finally lost in the semi-finals, being eliminated 6–0 by eventual gold medal winner, Bianca Walkden of Great Britain.

Bajić was one of 13 Serbian athletes taking part in the 2017 World Taekwondo Championships in South Korea, participating in the heavyweight category.

In June 2018, Bajić represented her country in the Mediterranean Games in Tarragona, Spain. She won bouts against opponents from Italy, Tunisia and France on her way to winning the gold medal.

In February 2019, Tepavac took part in the President Cup in Antalya, Turkey, reaching the quarter-finals of the +73 kg event before she was eliminated. In May of the same year, Tepavac went to the 2019 World Taekwondo Championships in Manchester, England. She won two bouts in the heavyweight category before losing in the quarter-finals to 2016 Olympic gold medallist Zheng Shuyin, by a score of 6–2.
