= 2011 World Taekwondo Olympic Qualification Tournament – Men's 58 kg =

Taekwondo competition

World Qualification Tournament
Men	Women
58 kg	49 kg
68 kg	57 kg
80 kg	67 kg
+80 kg	+67 kg

The Men's 58 kg is a competition featured at the 2011 World Taekwondo Olympic Qualification Tournament, and was held at the Sarhadchi Olympic Center in Baku, Azerbaijan on June 30. The first three ranked athletes qualify their NOCs a place each at the 2012 Olympic Games.

== Results ==
Legend

- DQ — Won by disqualification
- WD — Won by withdrawal

=== Finals ===
Semifinals
Lee Dae-hoon (KOR)	12
Gabriel Mercedes (DOM)	14
Pen-ek Karaket (THA)	6
Tamer Bayoumi (EGY)	3

Final
Gabriel Mercedes (DOM)
Pen-ek Karaket (THA)	WD
3rd place
Lee Dae-hoon (KOR)	8
Tamer Bayoumi (EGY)	6

=== Top half ===
==== Section 1 ====
Round of 64
Ron Atias (ISR)	10
Birane Guèye (SEN)	6
Shami Sadygov (UKR)	4
Tameem Al-Kubati (YEM)	6
Amran Saida (PLE)	1
Safwan Khalil (AUS)	9
Ali Suliman (SUD)	1
Jhonnatan Mejía (GUA)	6
Óscar Muñoz (COL)	3
Lee Dae-hoon (KOR)	6

Round of 32
Joel González (ESP)	7
Ron Atias (ISR)	1
Tameem Al-Kubati (YEM)	1
Safwan Khalil (AUS)	4
Japoy Lizardo (PHI)	10
Jhonnatan Mejía (GUA)	4
Lee Dae-hoon (KOR)	6
Damián Villa (MEX)	4

Round of 16
Joel González (ESP)	0
Safwan Khalil (AUS)	1
Japoy Lizardo (PHI)	3
Lee Dae-hoon (KOR)	7

Quarterfinals
Safwan Khalil (AUS)	4
Lee Dae-hoon (KOR)	5

==== Section 2 ====
Round of 64
Marios Tsourdinis (GRE)	1
Patricio Moreira (ECU)	0
Takaya Nakagawa (JPN)	3
Seydou Niang (MLI)	2
Frederico Muianga (MOZ)	8
Hussein Al-Abbood (IRQ)	3
Antonis Kyriakou (CYP)	5
Lê Huỳnh Châu (VIE)	6

Round of 32
Gabriel Mercedes (DOM)	10
Marios Tsourdinis (GRE)	6
Takaya Nakagawa (JPN)	1
Ruslan Poiseev (RUS)	0
Mario Leal (VEN)	13
Frederico Muianga (MOZ)	3
Lê Huỳnh Châu (VIE)	5
Rui Bragança (POR)	1

Round of 16
Gabriel Mercedes (DOM)	7
Takaya Nakagawa (JPN)	6
Mario Leal (VEN)	10
Lê Huỳnh Châu (VIE)	6

Quarterfinals
Gabriel Mercedes (DOM)	5
Mario Leal (VEN)	2

=== Bottom half ===
==== Section 3 ====
Round of 64
Mauro Crismanich (ARG)	DQ
~~Malick Juma Gulamrasul (TAN)~~
Ong Stevanus (INA)	DQ
~~Malik Shahzad Ahmed (PAK)~~
Sami Al-Anazi (KSA)	10
Alpheus Mkhonazi (RSA)	6
Elton Burnazi (ALB)	1
Vakhtang Japaridze (GEO)	11

Round of 32
Márcio Wenceslau (BRA)	11
Mauro Crismanich (ARG)	4
Ong Stevanus (INA)	2
Krasimir Tomanov (BUL)	4
~~Mokdad El-Yamine (ALG)~~
Sami Al-Anazi (KSA)	DQ
Vakhtang Japaridze (GEO)	1
Pen-ek Karaket (THA)	8

Round of 16
Márcio Wenceslau (BRA)	8
Krasimir Tomanov (BUL)	1
Sami Al-Anazi (KSA)	3
Pen-ek Karaket (THA)	19

Quarterfinals
Márcio Wenceslau (BRA)	1
Pen-ek Karaket (THA)	10

==== Section 4 ====
Round of 64
Sonexay Mangkheua (LAO)	1
Jermaine James (SUI)	0
Audy Muller (IOA)	5
Andrei Rotaru (MDA)	3
~~Robert Amzoiu (ROU)~~
Stipe Jarloni (CRO)	DQ
~~Mika Kalikat (COD)~~
Philip Reyes (DEN)	DQ
Kinley Penjor (BHU)	1
Nursultan Mamayev (KAZ)	8

Round of 32
~~Mohamed Salem Tlish (LBA)~~
Sonexay Mangkheua (LAO)	DQ
Audy Muller (IOA)	1
Tamer Bayoumi (EGY)	16
Stipe Jarloni (CRO)	11
Philip Reyes (DEN)	2
Nursultan Mamayev (KAZ)	3
Wei Chen-yang (TPE)	4

Round of 16
Sonexay Mangkheua (LAO)	0
Tamer Bayoumi (EGY)	12
Stipe Jarloni (CRO)	1
Wei Chen-yang (TPE)	0

Quarterfinals
Tamer Bayoumi (EGY)	1
Stipe Jarloni (CRO)	0
