= Reba Stewart =

Australian taekwondo practitioner

Reba Stewart (born 20 May 2001) is an Australian taekwondo practitioner.

== Career ==
Stewart represented Australia at the 2015 Cadet World Championships. She received the 2019 Outstanding Sporting Achievement Award at the Victorian School Sports Awards in Australia after she won the Taekwondo at the 2019 Pacific Games in the +73 kg category and competed in the World Taekwondo World Championships in 2019.

She was selected for the Taekwondo at the 2020 Summer Olympics – Women's +67 kg after she won the Oceania Tokyo 2020 Olympic Qualification event on 29 February 2020. Her opponent in the round of 16 was Aleksandra Kowalczuk who beat her 7-2 and therefore did not advance any further. Australia at the 2020 Summer Olympics details the results in depth.

== Personal life ==
She is a student at Maribyrnong College.
