= Yury Kirichenko =

Russian taekwondo practitioner

Personal information
- Nationality: Russian
- Born: February 18, 1991 (age 35) Kamchatka Krai

Sport
- Country: Russia
- Sport: Taekwondo
- Event: +80 kg
- Club: Black Warriors
- Coached by: Sergey Li
Medal record
Representing Russia
Men's taekwondo
European Championships
Gold medal – first place	2021 Sofia	87 kg
Bronze medal – third place	2018 Kazan	+87 kg
European Junior Championships
Gold medal – first place	2009 Vigo	+84 kg
Grand Prix
Bronze medal – third place	2017 Moscow	+80 kg
World Team Championship
Gold medal – first place	2018 Fujairah	-86 kg

Yury Konstantinovich Kirichenko (Russian: Юрий Константинович Кириченко; born 18 February 1991), is a Russian taekwondo athlete. In 2009, Kirichenko won gold at the World Junior Championships in Vigo. His best senior result to date was winning bronze at the 2017 Taekwondo Grand Prix Series in Moscow, bronze at the European Championship in Kazan 2018 and gold at the World Team Championship 2018.
