= 2018 European Taekwondo Championships =

Taekwondo competition

- Venue: Ak Bars Martial Arts Palace
- Location: Kazan, Russia
- Dates: 10–13 May
- Competitors: 363 from 46 nations

The 2018 European Taekwondo Championships, the 23rd edition of the European Taekwondo Championships, was held in Kazan, Russia at the Ak Bars Martial Arts Palace from 10 to 13 May 2018.

== Medal table ==
* Host nation (Russia)

Rank	Nation	Gold	Silver	Bronze	Total
1	Russia*	4	5	6	15
2	Turkey	3	4	2	9
3	Great Britain	3	1	3	7
4	Croatia	3	0	5	8
5	Spain	1	3	1	5
6	Azerbaijan	1	0	2	3
6	Poland	1	0	2	3
8	Moldova	0	1	1	2
9	Latvia	0	1	0	1
9	Netherlands	0	1	0	1
11	Germany	0	0	3	3
12	Italy	0	0	2	2
13	France	0	0	1	1
13	Norway	0	0	1	1
13	Serbia	0	0	1	1
13	Slovenia	0	0	1	1
13	Ukraine	0	0	1	1
Totals (17 entries)		16	16	32	64

== Medal summary ==
=== Men ===
Event	Gold	Silver	Bronze
−54 kg	Adrián Vicente; Spain	Magomed Gagiev; Russia	Vito Dell'Aquila; Italy
−54 kg	Adrián Vicente; Spain	Magomed Gagiev; Russia	Deniz Dağdelen; Turkey
−58 kg	Mikhail Artamonov; Russia	Jesús Tortosa; Spain	Valery Shimanov; Russia
−58 kg	Mikhail Artamonov; Russia	Jesús Tortosa; Spain	Stepan Dimitrov; Moldova
−63 kg	Lovre Brečić; Croatia	Hakan Reçber; Turkey	Bradly Sinden; Great Britain
−63 kg	Lovre Brečić; Croatia	Hakan Reçber; Turkey	Deni Andrun Razić; Croatia
−68 kg	Christian McNeish; Great Britain	Sarmat Tcakoev; Russia	Karol Robak; Poland
−68 kg	Christian McNeish; Great Britain	Sarmat Tcakoev; Russia	Viacheslav Minin; Russia
−74 kg	Toni Kanaet; Croatia	Muhammed Emin Yıldız; Turkey	Piero Marić; Croatia
−74 kg	Toni Kanaet; Croatia	Muhammed Emin Yıldız; Turkey	Peter Longobardi Radford; Great Britain
−80 kg	Maksim Khramtsov; Russia	Aaron Cook; Moldova	Milad Beigi; Azerbaijan
−80 kg	Maksim Khramtsov; Russia	Aaron Cook; Moldova	Richard Ordemann; Norway
−87 kg	Vladislav Larin; Russia	Daniel Ros; Spain	Ivan Trajkovič; Slovenia
−87 kg	Vladislav Larin; Russia	Daniel Ros; Spain	Alexander Bachmann; Germany
+87 kg	Radik Isayev; Azerbaijan	Roman Kuznetsov; Russia	Oleg Kuznetsov; Russia
+87 kg	Radik Isayev; Azerbaijan	Roman Kuznetsov; Russia	Yury Kirichenko; Russia

=== Women ===
Event	Gold	Silver	Bronze
−46 kg	Rukiye Yıldırım; Turkey	Dina Pouryounes; Netherlands	Jordyn Smith; Great Britain
−46 kg	Rukiye Yıldırım; Turkey	Dina Pouryounes; Netherlands	Iryna Romoldanova; Ukraine
−49 kg	Kristina Tomić; Croatia	Natalia Antipenko; Russia	Patimat Abakarova; Azerbaijan
−49 kg	Kristina Tomić; Croatia	Natalia Antipenko; Russia	Yasmina Aziez; France
−53 kg	Tatiana Kudashova; Russia	Inese Tarvida; Latvia	Tijana Bogdanović; Serbia
−53 kg	Tatiana Kudashova; Russia	Inese Tarvida; Latvia	Madeline Folgmann; Germany
−57 kg	Jade Jones; Great Britain	Hatice Kübra İlgün; Turkey	Patrycja Adamkiewicz; Poland
−57 kg	Jade Jones; Great Britain	Hatice Kübra İlgün; Turkey	Marija Štetić; Croatia
−62 kg	İrem Yaman; Turkey	Marta Calvo; Spain	Kristina Beroš; Croatia
−62 kg	İrem Yaman; Turkey	Marta Calvo; Spain	Rabia Bachmann; Germany
−67 kg	Lauren Williams; Great Britain	Nur Tatar; Turkey	Polina Khan; Russia
−67 kg	Lauren Williams; Great Britain	Nur Tatar; Turkey	Daniela Rotolo; Italy
−73 kg	Nafia Kuş; Turkey	Arina Zhivotkova; Russia	Iva Radoš; Croatia
−73 kg	Nafia Kuş; Turkey	Arina Zhivotkova; Russia	Cecilia Castro; Spain
+73 kg	Aleksandra Kowalczuk; Poland	Bianca Walkden; Great Britain	Sude Bulut; Turkey
+73 kg	Aleksandra Kowalczuk; Poland	Bianca Walkden; Great Britain	Olga Ivanova; Russia

== Participating nations ==
- Albania (2)
- Andorra (1)
- Armenia (6)
- Austria (7)
- Azerbaijan (15)
- Belarus (7)
- Belgium (9)
- Bosnia and Herzegovina (1)
- Bulgaria (6)
- Croatia (23)
- Cyprus (11)
- Czech Republic (6)
- Denmark (4)
- Estonia (1)
- Finland (4)
- France (12)
- Georgia (2)
- Germany (17)
- Great Britain (15)
- Greece (15)
- Hungary (3)
- Iceland (2)
- Ireland (1)
- Israel (8)
- Italy (14)
- Kosovo (4)
- Latvia (4)
- Lithuania (5)
- Macedonia (1)
- Moldova (9)
- Montenegro (1)
- Netherlands (2)
- Norway (3)
- Poland (12)
- Portugal (8)
- Romania (4)
- Russia (32)
- San Marino (4)
- Serbia (16)
- Slovakia (3)
- Slovenia (4)
- Spain (20)
- Sweden (8)
- Switzerland (2)
- Turkey (22)
- Ukraine (7)
