= Christian McNeish =

British taekwondo practitioner

Personal information
- Nationality: British
- Born: 8 April 1997 (age 29)
- Weight: 68 kg (150 lb)

Sport
- Sport: Taekwondo
Medal record
Representing Great Britain
Men's taekwondo
Grand Prix
Bronze medal – third place	2017 Moscow	68kg
Silver medal – second place	2019 Chiba	68 kg
European Championships
Gold medal – first place	2018 Kazan	68 kg
Youth Olympic Games
Bronze medal – third place	2014 Nanjing	63 kg
Universiade
Bronze medal – third place	2015 Gwangju	68 kg

Christian McNeish (born 8 April 1997) is a British taekwondo practitioner. He won the bronze medal at the 2014 Youth Olympic Games in the minus 63kg weight category.
