= Stepan Dimitrov =

Moldovan taekwondo athlete

Personal information
- Born: December 10, 1995 (age 30)

Sport
- Country: Moldova
- Sport: Taekwondo
Medal record
Representing Moldova
Men's taekwondo
European Championships
Gold medal – first place	2014 Baku	-54 kg
Bronze medal – third place	2018 Kazan	-58 kg

Stepan Dimitrov (born 10 December 1995) is a Moldovan taekwondo athlete. He represented Moldova in several international competitions and tournaments, winning two medals in the European Taekwondo Championships: gold medal in 2014 and a bronze in 2018.

== Achievements ==
European Championships
Year	Location	Medal	Category
2014	Baku (Azerbaijan)	Gold	–54 kg
2018	Kazan (Russia)	Bronze	–58 kg
