= Jackie Galloway =

American taekwondo practitioner

Personal information
- Nationality: American- Mexican
- Born: December 27, 1995 (age 30) Crown Point, Indiana, United States
- Height: 1.78 m (5 ft 10 in)
- Weight: 73 kg (161 lb)

Sport
- Country: United States
- Sport: Taekwondo
- Event: Heavyweight
Medal record
Representing United States
Women's taekwondo
Olympic Games
Bronze medal – third place	2016 Rio de Janeiro	+67 kg
World Championships
Bronze medal – third place	2015 Chelyabinsk	Middleweight
Silver medal – second place	2017 Muju	Heavyweight
Grand Prix
Gold medal – first place	2014 Astana	+67 kg
Gold medal – first place	2015 Samsun	+67 kg
Bronze medal – third place	2016 Baku	+67 kg
Pan American Games
Gold medal – first place	2015 Toronto	+67 kg
Pan American Championships
Gold medal – first place	2014 Portland	Heavyweight
Silver medal – second place	2016 Aguascalientes	Heavyweight
World Junior Championships
Bronze medal – third place	2012 Sharm-El-Sheikh	68 kg

Jaqueline Sanchez Galloway (born December 27, 1995) is an American taekwondo competitor and a bronze medalist in the 2016 Olympics. She is also a citizen of Mexico.

== Career ==
Galloway was an alternate for the Mexican team at the 2012 Olympics. She won bronze at the 2015 World Taekwondo Championships.

At the Rio 2016 Olympics, Galloway won a bronze medal in the 67 kg class.

In July 2019, Galloway was issued with a six-month ban by United States Anti-Doping Agency (USADA) for an anti-doping rule violation relating to unintential use of ibutamoren. She was able to prove that its source was a contanimated supplement, however a legal case she brought against the manufacturers was unsuccessful.

== Personal life ==
She was an engineering student at Southern Methodist University. While there she was on the rowing team.
