= Margarita Michailidou =

Greek taekwondo practitioner (born 1987)

Medal record

Representing Greece

Women's taekwondo

European Championships
Silver medal – second place	2010 St. Petersburg	Lightweight

Margarita Michailidou (Greek: Μαργαρίτα Μιχαηλίδου, born 26 September 1987) is a Greek taekwondo practitioner. Michailidou won the silver medal in the women's welterweight (under 67 kg) division at the 2010 European Taekwondo Championships.
