= Anne-Caroline Graffe =

French taekwondo practitioner

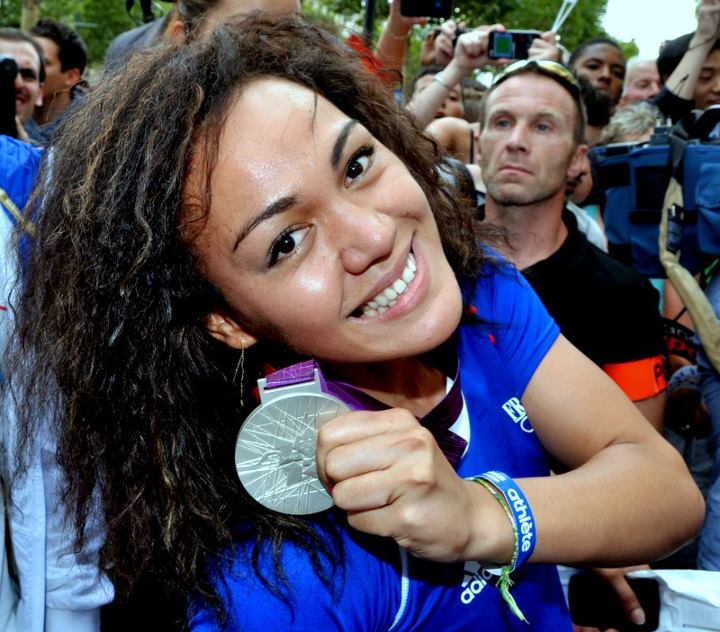

Personal information
- Nationality: French
- Born: 12 February 1986 (age 40) Papeete, Tahiti in French Polynesia
- Height: 176 cm (5 ft 9 in)

Sport
- Country: France
- Sport: Taekwondo
Medal record
Representing France
Olympic Games
Silver medal – second place	2012 London	+67 kg
World Championships
Gold medal – first place	2011 Gyeongju	Heavyweight
Bronze medal – third place	2013 Puebla	Heavyweight
European Championships
Gold medal – first place	2012 Manchester	Heavyweight
Silver medal – second place	2010 St. Petersburg	Heavyweight
Bronze medal – third place	2008 Rome	Heavyweight
Universiade
Bronze medal – third place	2011 Shenzhen	-73kg
Representing Tahiti
Pacific Games
Gold medal – first place	2011 Nouméa	+73kg
Silver medal – second place	2011 Nouméa	Team

Anne-Caroline Graffe (born 12 February 1986 in Papeete, Tahiti in French Polynesia) is a French taekwondo athlete.

Graffe took up taekwondo when she was 11 years old. She left Tahiti for metropolitan France when she was 18 years old.

She won the women's heavyweight title at the 2011 World Taekwondo Championships, held in Gyeongju, South Korea, defeating South Korean An Sae-Bom 1–0 in the final.

She won the gold medal at the 2012 European Taekwondo Championships.

Graffe, who had been training under Myriam Baverel at the Institut national du sport, de l'expertise et de la performance (INSEP) for five years, had only been entered for the competition a month before the start of the 2012 Summer Olympics following the withdrawal due to injury of Gwladys Épangue. She was the first Polynesian to represent France at the Olympic Games. In her first Olympic competition, she was seeded number one. She cruised through the early rounds to reach the final, where she met Serbia's Milica Mandić. After a tight opening two rounds, Mandić opened up in the third and picked off Graffe with rapid kicks to the body and ran out a 9–7 winner.

== See also ==
- France at the 2012 Summer Olympics
- Taekwondo at the 2012 Summer Olympics
