= Han Yingying =

Chinese Taekwondo practitioner

Medal record

Representing China

Women's taekwondo

World Championships
Gold medal – first place	2009 Copenhagen	Middleweight

Asian Championships
Silver medal – second place	2010 Astana	Middleweight

Han Yingying (Chinese: 韩颖颖; pinyin: Hán Yǐngyǐng; born April 20, 1986) is a female Chinese Taekwondo practitioner.
