= Mamina Koné =

Ivorian taekwondo practitioner

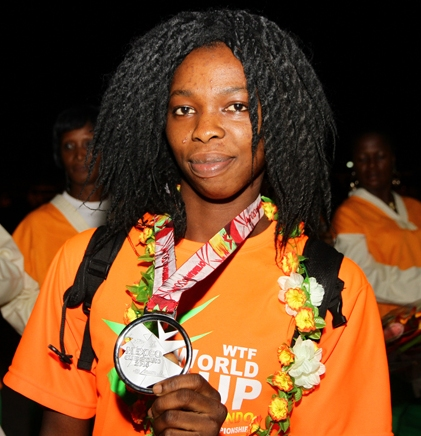

Personal information
- Nationality: Ivorian
- Born: 27 December 1988 (age 37)

Sport
- Sport: Taekwondo

Mamina Koné (born 27 December 1988) is an Ivorian taekwondo athlete.

She represented Ivory Coast at the 2016 Summer Olympics in Rio de Janeiro, in the women's +67 kg. She was eliminated by the French athlete Gwladys Épangue in a 3:1 defeat. She was part of am Ivorian team that included Cheick Sallah Cissé and Ruth Gbagbi who both won medals.
