= Vanja Babić =

Serbian taekwondo practitioner

Medal record

Men's taekwondo

Representing Serbia

World Championships
Bronze medal – third place	2009 Copenhagen	-87kg

European Championships
Bronze medal – third place	2012 Manchester	+87kg

Mediterranean Games
Bronze medal – third place	2013 Mersin	+80kg

Vanja Babić (Serbian Cyrillic: Вања Бабић, born 18 July 1981) is a Serbian taekwondo athlete.

He won bronze medals at the 2009 World Taekwondo Championships and at the 2012 European Taekwondo Championships.
