= Bianca Walkden =

English taekwondo athlete (born 1991)

Personal information
- Nickname: Queen B
- Born: Bianca Walkden; 29 September 1991 (age 34) Liverpool, England
- Education: Fitness and Exercise Management
- Spouse: Aaron Cook (m. 2022)

Sport
- Country: Great Britain
- Sport: Taekwondo
- Weight class: Heavyweight
- College team: The Manchester College
- Club: Liverpool Elite Taekwondo
- Team: GB Taekwondo

Achievements and titles
- Olympic finals: (bronze) (2016),(2020)
- World finals: 1st (2015), (2017), (2019)
Medal record
Women's taekwondo
Representing Great Britain
Olympic Games
Bronze medal – third place	2016 Rio de Janeiro	+67 kg
Bronze medal – third place	2020 Tokyo	+67 kg
World Championships
Gold medal – first place	2015 Chelyabinsk	+73 kg
Gold medal – first place	2017 Muju	+73 kg
Gold medal – first place	2019 Manchester	+73 kg
Bronze medal – third place	2023 Baku	+73 kg
Grand Slam
Gold medal – first place	2017 Wuxi	+67 kg
Gold medal – first place	2018 Wuxi	+67 kg
Silver medal – second place	2019 Wuxi	+67 kg
Grand Prix
Gold medal – first place	2016 Baku (F)	+67 kg
Gold medal – first place	2017 Moscow	+67 kg
Gold medal – first place	2017 Rabat	+67 kg
Gold medal – first place	2017 London	+67 kg
Gold medal – first place	2017 Abidjan (F)	+67 kg
Silver medal – second place	2015 Samsun	+67 kg
Silver medal – second place	2015 Manchester	+67 kg
Silver medal – second place	2018 Manchester	+67 kg
Silver medal – second place	2018 Taoyuan	+67 kg
Silver medal – second place	2018 Fujairah (F)	+67 kg
Silver medal – second place	2019 Chiba	+67 kg
Silver medal – second place	2019 Sofia	+67 kg
Silver medal – second place	2022 Riyadh (F)	+67 kg
Bronze medal – third place	2014 Suzhou	+67 kg
Bronze medal – third place	2015 Moscow	+67 kg
Bronze medal – third place	2018 Rome	+67 kg
European Championships
Gold medal – first place	2014 Baku	+73 kg
Gold medal – first place	2016 Montreux	+73 kg
Gold medal – first place	2021 Sofia	+73 kg
Gold medal – first place	2022 Manchester	+73 kg
Silver medal – second place	2018 Kazan	+73 kg
Bronze medal – third place	2010 Saint Petersburg	+73 kg
World Combat Games
Gold medal – first place	2010 Beijing	+67 kg
World Junior Championships
Silver medal – second place	2008 İzmir	+68 kg
European Junior Championships
Bronze medal – third place	2007 Baku	+68 kg

Bianca Cook, also known as Bianca Walkden (born 29 September 1991), is an English taekwondo athlete and Olympian. She is a three-time World champion, two-time World Grand Prix champion, four-time European champion and a double Olympic medallist.

== Career ==
In 2014, Walkden became European champion for the first time with a 6‍–‍2 win over Olga Ivanova in Baku.

In May 2015, she won a gold medal in the +73kg category at the 2015 World Taekwondo Championships in Russia, triumphing over Gwladys Epangue in the final. She became only the second Briton to win a world title, after Sarah Stevenson, and the third to win a global title after Stevenson and Jade Jones.

In the run-up to the 2016 Summer Olympics, Walkden became European champion again, defeating Nafia Kus 5‍–‍4 in Montreux. At the games, Walkden was defeated by Zheng Shuyin by a golden-point in the semi-finals, but she then overcame Wiam Dislam 7‍–‍1 to secure a bronze medal.

In June 2017, Walkden successfully defended her world title in Muju, South Korea during the World Championships. She beat American Jackie Galloway 14–4 in the heavyweight division. Victory meant she became the first Briton to successfully defend a World taekwondo title. Walkden then became the first ever competitor to win gold medals at all four World Grand Prix events in the same year. She won the first three meetings in Moscow, Rabat and London, before overcoming Lee Da-bin 16‍–‍9 in the final round in Côte d'Ivoire to seal the feat. In December, Walkden achieved victory at the Grand Slam Series in China, overcoming Galloway 10‍–‍2 in the final, which earned her a record £52,000 prize.

Walkden was defeated by Kowalczuk in the final of the 2018 European championships in Kazan. It was her first defeat in the heavyweight division in over a year, having won her previous nine tournaments.

In May 2019, at the 2019 World Taekwondo Championships, Walkden won the women's heavyweight title after Zheng was disqualified after attaining a 20–10 lead. Faced with Zheng's subsequent inactivity, Walkden adopted the tactic of repeatedly forcing her opponent out of the ring to raise her penalty points from seven to ten, an automatic disqualification. This resulted in boos during the result announcement and medal presentation, when Zheng fell to her knees. Walkden defended her tactics, saying: "I went out there needing to find a different way to win and a win is a win if you disqualify someone - it's not my fault."

In September 2019, at Chiba, Walkden was defeated 7-5 by Zheng Shuyin in the World Grand Prix. In October, at the World Grand Prix event in Sofia, Zheng Shuyin defeated Walkden by 3–2.

In 2021, she won the gold medal in the women's +73 kg event at the 2021 European Taekwondo Championships held in Sofia. At the delayed Taekwondo at the 2020 Summer Olympics in Tokyo, Walkden suffered a narrow 24‍–‍25 defeat to Lee Da-bin, costing her a chance to compete in the gold medal contest. She then competed in the repechage, bouncing back to claim a bronze medal, with a 7‍–‍3 triumph over Kowalczuk. It was her second Olympic bronze medal, to go with the one she secured in Rio de Janeiro.

In 2022, Walkden became European champion for a fourth time, securing a 14‍–‍3 victory over Aleksandra Kowalczuk in Manchester.

At the 2023 World Championships, she finished with a bronze medal after a semi-finals defeat to Svetlana Osipova.

She was overlooked for selection by GB Taekwondo for the 2024 Summer Olympics, a decision that left her feeling "devastated" and "let down". Rebecca McGowan was chosen ahead of her due to her better ranking. Walkden had been world number one from 2016‍–‍ 2023, before missing several events with injury, and she wanted to have a fight-off with McGowan to decide selection, but the GB Taekwondo disagreed, feeling McGowan had the better chance of winning a medal.

== Personal life ==
She has been in a relationship with fellow taekwondo fighter Aaron Cook since 2008, and the pair married at a ceremony in Italy in 2022. She once lived with international teammate Jade Jones, who is a close friend.
