= Lauren Cahoon =

American taekwondo practitioner

Personal information
- Born: 20 January 1985 (age 41) Jacksonville, Florida, United States

Sport
- Sport: Taekwondo
Medal record
Representing United States
Pan American Games
| Bronze medal – third place | 2011 Guadalajara | +67 kg |

Lauren Cahoon Hamon (born January 20, 1985) is an Olympic-style Taekwondo martial artist. Lauren was a competitor in MTV2's Final Fu reality TV show, but dropped out after deciding that she didn't agree with the way sparring was being run.

== Competition record (list) ==
- 2006 Sr. National Team Trials (Heavy): 1st
- 2005 U.S. Senior Nationals (Heavy): BRONZE
- 2005 World University Games (Heavy): Quarterfinals
- 2005 Collegiate Trials (Heavy): GOLD
- 2005 World Championships (Heavy): Quarterfinals
- 2005 Senior National Team Member (Heavy)
- 2004 Canadian Open: SILVER
- 2004 U.S. Senior Nationals: BRONZE
- 2004 Belgium Open: SILVER
- 2004 U.S. Open: BRONZE
- 2003 Collegiate Nationals: GOLD
- 2003 U.S. Senior Nationals: GOLD
- 2002 Junior Olympics: GOLD
- 2001 Junior Olympics: BRONZE
