= Gadzhi Umarov =

Russian taekwondo practitioner

Gadzhi Umarov (born 6 May 1985 in Buynaksk) is a Russian taekwondo practitioner. He competed in the +80 kg event at the 2012 Summer Olympics; he was eliminated by Canada's François Coulombe-Fortier in the preliminary round.

He is a graduate of the "Five Directions of the World" boarding school in Dagestan, Russia.
