= Iva Radoš =

Croatian taekwondo practitioner (born 1995)

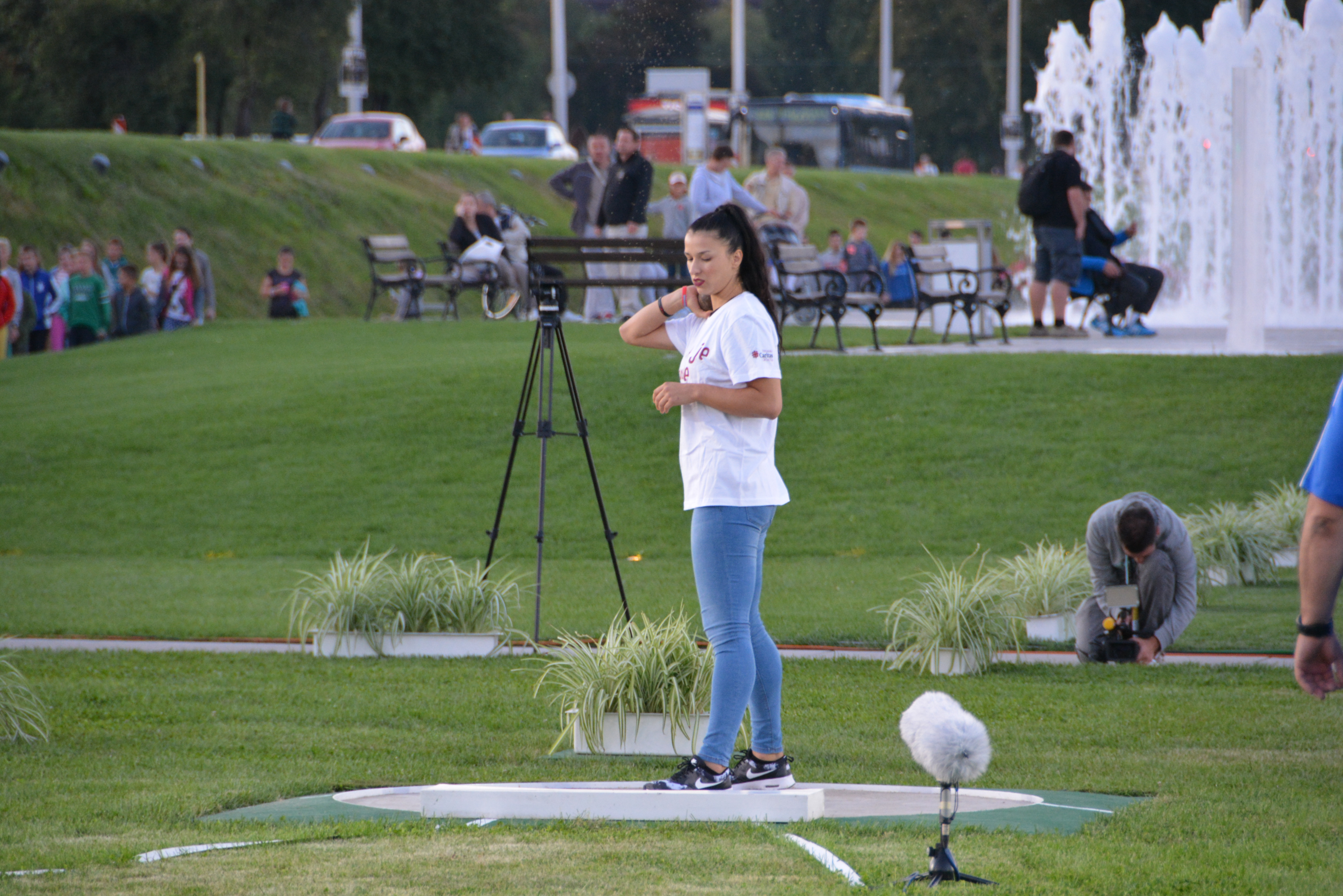

Personal information
- Nationality: Croatian
- Born: 7 November 1995 (age 30)

Sport
- Sport: Taekwondo
Medal record
Representing Croatia
Women's taekwondo
World Championships
Bronze medal – third place	2015 Chelyabinsk	Middleweight
European Championships
Gold medal – first place	2014 Baku	-73 kg
Gold medal – first place	2016 Montreux	-73 kg
Bronze medal – third place	2018 Kazan	-73 kg

Iva Radoš (born 7 November 1995) is a Croatian taekwondo practitioner.

She won a bronze medal in middleweight at the 2015 World Taekwondo Championships, after being defeated by Zheng Shuyin in the semifinal. Her achievements at the European Taekwondo Championships include gold medals in 2014 and 2016, and a bronze medal in 2018. She won 76 out of 118 registered fights, 708 hitpoints distributed and 462 collected during fights, won 4 golden point(s) and lost 7, participated at 62 tournaments, 62 with international and 0 with national valuation.
