= 2015 World Taekwondo Championships =

Taekwondo competition

- Venue: Traktor Ice Arena
- Location: Chelyabinsk, Russia
- Dates: 12–18 May 2015
- Competitors: 872 from 139 nations

Champions
- Men: Iran
- Women: South Korea

The 2015 World Taekwondo Championships were the 22nd edition of the World Taekwondo Championships, and were held in Chelyabinsk, Russia from 12 to 18 May 2015. The decision to award the games to Russia was made in 2013 as they out-voted both Vietnam and Brazil.

== Medal table ==
Rank	Nation	Gold	Silver	Bronze	Total
1	South Korea	4	0	1	5
2	Iran	3	0	2	5
3	Turkey	2	1	1	4
4	Uzbekistan	1	2	0	3
5	Chinese Taipei	1	1	1	3
5	Great Britain	1	1	1	3
7	World Taekwondo Federation	1	1	0	2
8	Thailand	1	0	1	2
9	Azerbaijan	1	0	0	1
9	Japan	1	0	0	1
11	Spain	0	3	1	4
12	Russia	0	2	5	7
13	China	0	2	1	3
14	France	0	1	0	1
14	Ivory Coast	0	1	0	1
14	Ukraine	0	1	0	1
17	Brazil	0	0	2	2
17	Croatia	0	0	2	2
17	Cuba	0	0	2	2
17	United States	0	0	2	2
21	Belarus	0	0	1	1
21	Colombia	0	0	1	1
21	Gabon	0	0	1	1
21	Germany	0	0	1	1
21	Greece	0	0	1	1
21	Hungary	0	0	1	1
21	Mali	0	0	1	1
21	Mexico	0	0	1	1
21	Moldova	0	0	1	1
21	Serbia	0	0	1	1
Totals (30 entries)		16	16	32	64

== Medal summary ==
=== Men ===
Event	Gold	Silver	Bronze
Finweight (−54 kg)	Kim Tae-hun; South Korea	Stanislav Denisov; Russia	Venilton Teixeira; Brazil
Finweight (−54 kg)	Kim Tae-hun; South Korea	Stanislav Denisov; Russia	Ramnarong Sawekwiharee; Thailand
Flyweight (−58 kg)	Farzan Ashourzadeh; Iran	Si Mohamed Ketbi; World Taekwondo Federation	Ruslan Poiseev; Russia
Flyweight (−58 kg)	Farzan Ashourzadeh; Iran	Si Mohamed Ketbi; World Taekwondo Federation	Zhao Shuai; China
Bantamweight (−63 kg)	Jaouad Achab; World Taekwondo Federation	Joel González; Spain	Abolfazl Yaghoubi; Iran
Bantamweight (−63 kg)	Jaouad Achab; World Taekwondo Federation	Joel González; Spain	Saúl Gutiérrez; Mexico
Featherweight (−68 kg)	Servet Tazegül; Turkey	Aleksey Denisenko; Russia	José Antonio Rosillo; Spain
Featherweight (−68 kg)	Servet Tazegül; Turkey	Aleksey Denisenko; Russia	Shin Dong-yun; South Korea
Lightweight (−74 kg)	Masoud Hajji-Zavareh; Iran	Nikita Rafalovich; Uzbekistan	Albert Gaun; Russia
Lightweight (−74 kg)	Masoud Hajji-Zavareh; Iran	Nikita Rafalovich; Uzbekistan	Ismaël Coulibaly; Mali
Welterweight (−80 kg)	Mehdi Khodabakhshi; Iran	Damon Sansum; Great Britain	Aaron Cook; Moldova
Welterweight (−80 kg)	Mehdi Khodabakhshi; Iran	Damon Sansum; Great Britain	Tahir Güleç; Germany
Middleweight (−87 kg)	Radik Isayev; Azerbaijan	Jasur Baykuziyev; Uzbekistan	Vladislav Larin; Russia
Middleweight (−87 kg)	Radik Isayev; Azerbaijan	Jasur Baykuziyev; Uzbekistan	Rafael Alba; Cuba
Heavyweight (+87 kg)	Dmitriy Shokin; Uzbekistan	Firmin Zokou; Ivory Coast	Anthony Obame; Gabon
Heavyweight (+87 kg)	Dmitriy Shokin; Uzbekistan	Firmin Zokou; Ivory Coast	Robelis Despaigne; Cuba

=== Women ===
Event	Gold	Silver	Bronze
Finweight (−46 kg)	Panipak Wongpattanakit; Thailand	Iryna Romoldanova; Ukraine	Lin Wan-ting; Chinese Taipei
Finweight (−46 kg)	Panipak Wongpattanakit; Thailand	Iryna Romoldanova; Ukraine	Iris Sing; Brazil
Flyweight (−49 kg)	Ha Min-ah; South Korea	Wu Jingyu; China	Svetlana Igumenova; Russia
Flyweight (−49 kg)	Ha Min-ah; South Korea	Wu Jingyu; China	Tijana Bogdanović; Serbia
Bantamweight (−53 kg)	Lim Geum-byeol; South Korea	Huang Yun-wen; Chinese Taipei	Ana Zaninović; Croatia
Bantamweight (−53 kg)	Lim Geum-byeol; South Korea	Huang Yun-wen; Chinese Taipei	Andriana Asprogeraka; Greece
Featherweight (−57 kg)	Mayu Hamada; Japan	Eva Calvo; Spain	Kimia Alizadeh; Iran
Featherweight (−57 kg)	Mayu Hamada; Japan	Eva Calvo; Spain	Edina Kotsis; Hungary
Lightweight (−62 kg)	İrem Yaman; Turkey	Marta Calvo; Spain	Viktoryia Belanouskaya; Belarus
Lightweight (−62 kg)	İrem Yaman; Turkey	Marta Calvo; Spain	Rachelle Booth; Great Britain
Welterweight (−67 kg)	Chuang Chia-chia; Chinese Taipei	Nur Tatar; Turkey	Paige McPherson; United States
Welterweight (−67 kg)	Chuang Chia-chia; Chinese Taipei	Nur Tatar; Turkey	Katherine Dumar; Colombia
Middleweight (−73 kg)	Oh Hye-ri; South Korea	Zheng Shuyin; China	Jackie Galloway; United States
Middleweight (−73 kg)	Oh Hye-ri; South Korea	Zheng Shuyin; China	Iva Radoš; Croatia
Heavyweight (+73 kg)	Bianca Walkden; Great Britain	Gwladys Épangue; France	Nafia Kuş; Turkey
Heavyweight (+73 kg)	Bianca Walkden; Great Britain	Gwladys Épangue; France	Olga Ivanova; Russia

== Team ranking ==
=== Men ===
Rank	Team	Points
1	Iran	65
2	Russia	50
3	Uzbekistan	43
4	South Korea	42
5	Spain	34
6	World Taekwondo Fed.	33
7	Turkey	33
8	Azerbaijan	30
9	Mexico	29
10	United States	26

=== Women ===
Rank	Team	Points
1	South Korea	56
2	Chinese Taipei	41
3	Turkey	40
4	China	38
5	Great Britain	31
6	Russia	31
7	Spain	28
8	France	26
9	United States	26
10	Croatia	25

== Participating nations ==
A total of 872 athletes from 139 nations competed.

- Afghanistan (10)
- Albania (3)
- Algeria (5)
- Angola (2)
- Argentina (5)
- Armenia (5)
- Aruba (1)
- Australia (15)
- Austria (2)
- Azerbaijan (12)
- Bangladesh (2)
- Belarus (11)
- Benin (2)
- Botswana (5)
- Brazil (16)
- Bulgaria (6)
- Cambodia (1)
- Canada (16)
- Cape Verde (3)
- Central African Republic (3)
- Chad (4)
- Chile (11)
- China (16)
- Chinese Taipei (16)
- Colombia (15)
- Congo DR (4)
- Costa Rica (2)
- Croatia (12)
- Cuba (5)
- Cyprus (13)
- Czech Republic (3)
- Denmark (2)
- Dominican Republic (10)
- East Timor (3)
- Ecuador (5)
- Egypt (16)
- Ethiopia (2)
- Finland (6)
- France (16)
- French Polynesia (4)
- Gabon (7)
- Georgia (1)
- Germany (13)
- Ghana (5)
- Great Britain (14)
- Greece (15)
- Guadeloupe (1)
- Guatemala (4)
- Guyana (2)
- Haiti (1)
- Honduras (4)
- Hong Kong (2)
- Hungary (6)
- Iceland (3)
- India (3)
- Iran (13)
- Iraq (3)
- Ireland (5)
- Israel (7)
- Italy (10)
- Ivory Coast (14)
- Jamaica (4)
- Japan (6)
- Jordan (13)
- Kazakhstan (16)
- Kenya (5)
- Kosovo (2)
- Kyrgyzstan (4)
- Laos (1)
- Latvia (2)
- Lesotho (3)
- Liberia (2)
- Libya (4)
- Lithuania (3)
- Macau (7)
- Macedonia (1)
- Madagascar (5)
- Malaysia (6)
- Mali (8)
- Malta (2)
- Mexico (16)
- Moldova (5)
- Monaco (1)
- Mongolia (5)
- Montenegro (2)
- Morocco (9)
- Mozambique (2)
- Netherlands (7)
- New Zealand (2)
- Niger (2)
- Nigeria (5)
- Norway (4)
- Oman (3)
- Pakistan (3)
- Palestine (2)
- Panama (2)
- Peru (5)
- Philippines (12)
- Poland (11)
- Portugal (6)
- Puerto Rico (7)
- Qatar (4)
- Romania (2)
- Russia (16)
- Rwanda (6)
- San Marino (2)
- Saudi Arabia (3)
- Senegal (5)
- Serbia (13)
- Seychelles (1)
- Singapore (2)
- Slovakia (2)
- Slovenia (6)
- Somalia (1)
- South Africa (3)
- South Korea (16)
- Spain (16)
- Sudan (11)
- Swaziland (6)
- Sweden (8)
- Switzerland (2)
- Tajikistan (6)
- Thailand (8)
- Tonga (2)
- Trinidad and Tobago (3)
- Tunisia (6)
- Turkey (16)
- Turkmenistan (5)
- U. S. Virgin Islands (2)
- Ukraine (16)
- United Arab Emirates (2)
- United States (16)
- Uruguay (2)
- Uzbekistan (7)
- Venezuela (9)
- Vietnam (9)
- World Taekwondo Federation (6)
- Yemen (2)
- Zimbabwe (2)
- ^{a} Athletes from Belgium competed as World Taekwondo Federation (WTF) due to the suspension of the country's Taekwondo Federation.
