= Furkan Asena Aydın =

Turkish taekwondo practitioner

Personal information
- Nationality: Turkish
- Born: February 12, 1992 (age 34)

Sport
- Country: Turkey
- Sport: Taekwondo
- Event: Middleweight
Medal record
World Championships
Bronze medal – third place	2009 Copenhagen	Middleweight
Gold medal – first place	2008 Izmir	Youth –68 kg
European Championships
Gold medal – first place	2009 Trelleborg	Youth +68 kg
Gold medal – first place	2007 Baku	Youth –63 kg
Gold medal – first place	2005 Palermo	Cadet –50 kg
Summer Universiade
Silver medal – second place	2011 Shenzhen	–67kg
Tournaments
Silver medal – second place	2011 German Open Hamburg	Middleweight
Silver medal – second place	2009 Spanish Open Alicante	Middleweight
Gold medal – first place	2008 Belgian Open Herentals	–68 kg
Bronze medal – third place	2008 German Open Hamburg	–72 kg
Bronze medal – third place	2007 Dutch Open Eindhoven	Youth –63 kg

Furkan Asena Aydın (born February 12, 1992) is a Turkish taekwondo practitioner competing in the middleweight division.

Furkan Asena Aydın won a bronze medal at the 2009 World Taekwondo Championships held in Copenhagen, Denmark. At the 2011 Summer Universiade in Shenzhen, China, she won the silver medal in the -67 kg division.

== See also ==
- Turkish women in sports
