= Briseida Acosta =

Mexican taekwondo practitioner

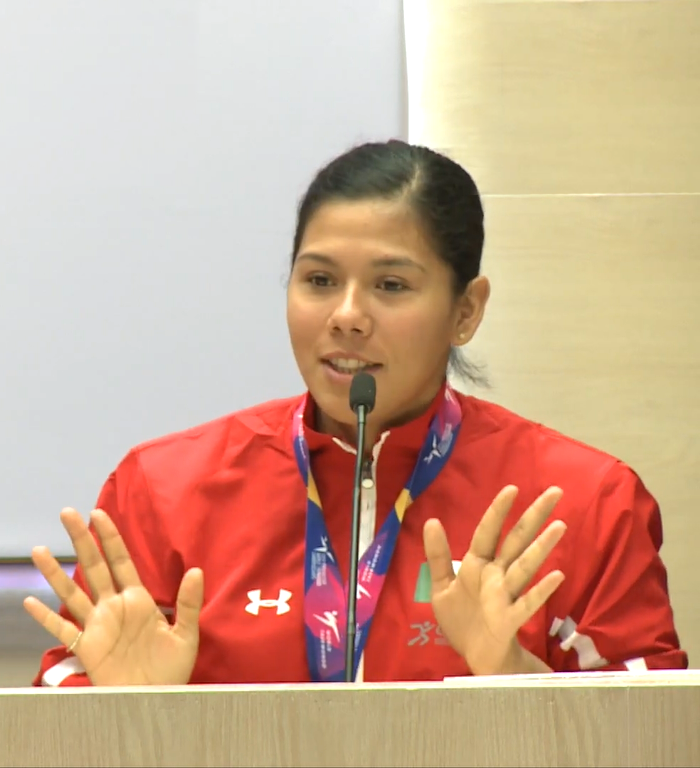
- Acosta in 2019

Personal information
- Full name: Briseida Acosta Balarezo
- Born: 30 August 1993 (age 32) Navolato, Mexico

Sport
- Country: Mexico
- Sport: Taekwondo
- Event: +73 kg
- Team: MEX
Medal record
Representing Mexico
World Championships
Silver medal – second place	2013 Puebla	+73 kg
Bronze medal – third place	2019 Manchester	+73 kg
Grand Prix
Silver medal – second place	2014 Suzhou	+67 kg
Silver medal – second place	2019 Rome	+67 kg
Bronze medal – third place	2013 Manchester	+67 kg
Bronze medal – third place	2017 London	+67 kg
Pan American Games
Gold medal – first place	2019 Lima	+67 kg
Pan American Championships
Gold medal – first place	2014 Aguascalientes	+73 kg
Silver medal – second place	2018 Spokane	+73 kg
Bronze medal – third place	2016 Queretaro	+73 kg
Universiade
Bronze medal – third place	2017 Taipei	+73 kg
Youth Olympic Games
Silver medal – second place	2010 Singapore	+63 kg
- Updated on 10 June 2019

Briseida Acosta Balarezo (Note: In this Spanish name, the first or paternal surname is Acosta and the second or maternal family name is Balarezo.) (born 30 August 1993) is a Mexican taekwondo athlete. She won the silver medal at the 2013 World Taekwondo Championships on the women's heavyweights and the bronze medal at the 2019 World Taekwondo Championships on the same weight category.
