= Tina Røe Skaar =

Norwegian taekwondo athlete

Personal information
- Nationality: Norwegian
- Born: 31 August 1993 (age 32)

Sport
- Sport: Taekwondo

Tina Røe Skaar (born 31 August 1993) is a Norwegian taekwondo practitioner.

She qualified for competing at the 2016 Summer Olympics in Rio de Janeiro, by winning the +67 kg class in the 2016 European Taekwondo Olympic Qualification Tournament, after winning her matches against Nafia Kuş, Olga Ivanova and Reshmie Oogink.
