= Maryna Konieva =

Ukrainian taekwondo practitioner

Personal information
- Born: 19 October 1987 (age 38) Kharkiv, Ukraine, Soviet Union

Sport
- Country: Ukraine
- Sport: Taekwondo
Medal record
Representing Ukraine
European Championships
Bronze medal – third place	2008 Rome	Heavyweight

Maryna Konieva (born October 19, 1987 in Kharkiv) is a taekwondo athlete from Ukraine who took part in the London Olympics 2012. She won the Bronze Medal in the 2008 European Taekwondo Championships.

== 2012 London Olympics ==
Konieva beat Nadin Dawani 18–13 in the preliminary round. She went on to lose 2—16 in the quarterfinals to Glenhis Hernandez.

== See also ==
- Taekwondo at the 2012 Summer Olympics – Women's +67 kg
