= Gwladys Épangue =

French taekwondo practitioner

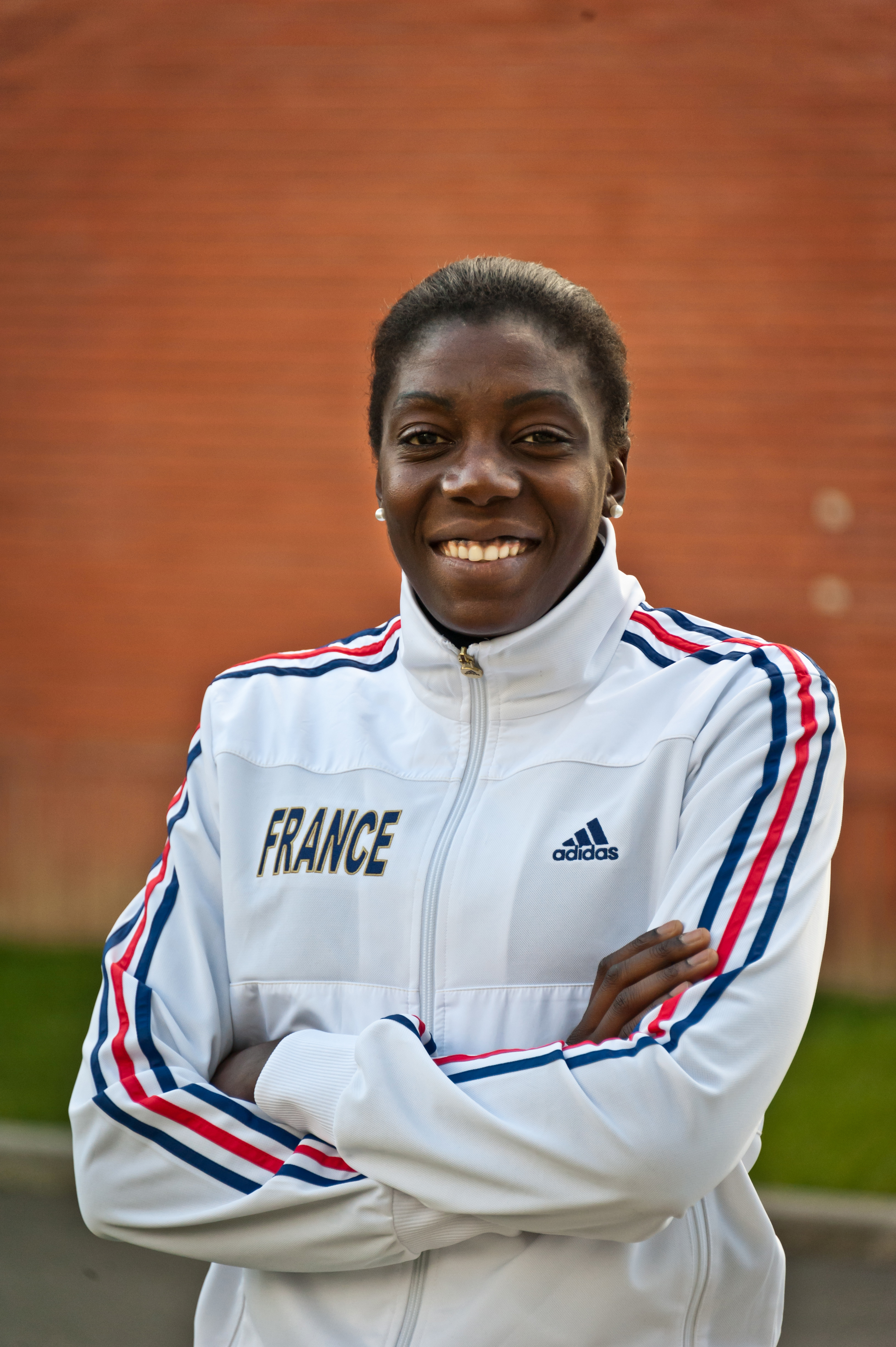
- Épangue in 2012

Personal information
- Full name: Gwladys Patience Épangue
- Born: 15 August 1983 (age 43) Clichy-la-Garenne, France
- Height: 1.78 m (5 ft 10 in)
- Weight: 79 kg (174 lb)
Medal record
Women's taekwondo
Representing France
Olympic Games
Bronze medal – third place	2008 Beijing	–67 kg
World Championships
Gold medal – first place	2009 Copenhagen	Welterweight
Gold medal – first place	2011 Gyeongju	Middleweight
Silver medal – second place	2005 Madrid	Welterweight
Silver medal – second place	2007 Beijing	Welterweight
Silver medal – second place	2015 Chelyabinsk	Heavyweight
European Championships
Gold medal – first place	2002 Samsun	–55kg
Gold medal – first place	2004 Lillehammer	–59kg
Gold medal – first place	2005 Riga	–67kg
Silver medal – second place	2000 Patras	–55kg
Silver medal – second place	2006 Bonn	–67kg
Silver medal – second place	2008 Rome	–67kg
Bronze medal – third place	2010 Saint Petersburg	–73kg
European Games
Gold medal – first place	2015 Baku	+67 kg
Summer Universiade
Gold medal – first place	2009 Belgrade	-72 kg
Bronze medal – third place	2003 Daegu	+67 kg
Bronze medal – third place	2005 Izmir	+67 kg

Gwladys Patience Épangue (born 15 August 1983 in Clichy-la-Garenne) is a French taekwondo athlete. Representing France at the 2005 World Taekwondo Championships in Madrid, she won the silver medal in the welterweight division, losing to Hwang Kyung-Seon from South Korea in the final. At the 2007 World Taekwondo Championships in Beijing, she won a silver medal, losing to Hwang in the final again.

Épangue represented her country in the –67 kg class at the 2008 Beijing Olympics and won a bronze medal.

In 2009, Épangue won her first World Championship gold medal in welterweight at the 2009 World Taekwondo Championships in Copenhagen, Denmark. In Round of 32, she edged out South Korean's favorite Park Hye-Mi, who demolished Icelandic champion Auður Jónsdóttir 22–1 in the first round, in overtime. In the semifinal match, Épangue beat European rival Sandra Šarić of Croatia, 2008 European Champion and 4-time World Championship medalist, 6–1.

Épangue withdrew from the 2012 Summer Olympics because of injury was replaced by her compatriot Anne-Caroline Graffe.
