= An Sae-bom =

South Korean taekwondoin (born 1990)

Medal record

Representing South Korea

Women's taekwondo

World Championships
Silver medal – second place	2011 Gyeongju	Heavyweight
Bronze medal – third place	2017 Muju	Heavyweight

Asian Championships
Gold medal – first place	2008 Henan	Middleweight

An Sae-Bom (Korean: 안새봄; born 13 February 1990) is a South Korean taekwondo practitioner. She received a silver medal at the 2011 World Taekwondo Olympic Qualification Tournament for the 2012 Summer Olympics. She retired after her final interview for police officers with martial arts skills in 2019. In 2020, she received disciplinary action by the Korea Taekwondo Association for making a fuss in a restaurant nearby the jincheon athlete village while drunk.
