= Katherine Rodríguez =

Taekwondo practitioner from the Dominican Republic

Personal information
- Born: 18 December 1991 (age 34) Santiago de los Caballeros, Santiago, Dominican Republic

Sport
- Sport: Taekwondo
Medal record
Women's taekwondo
Representing the Dominican Republic
Pan American Games
| Gold medal – first place | 2023 Santiago | Team |
| Bronze medal – third place | 2011 Guadalajara | 67 kg |
Pan American Championships
| Bronze medal – third place | 2021 Cancún | +73 kg |
Central American and Caribbean Games
| Silver medal – second place | 2010 Mayaguez | Under 67kg |

Katherine Julissa Rodríguez Peguero (born December 18, 1991) is a Dominican taekwondo practitioner who has won two medals for her home country in regional games.

== Career ==
Katherine won the silver medal in the 2010 Central American and Caribbean Games at the Under 67 kg category.

Rodríguez won the bronze medal at the 67 kg category at the 2011 Pan American Games in Guadalajara, Mexico.

She represented the Dominican Republic at the 2020 Summer Olympics.

She won the 2021 Pan American Championships Bronze medal in the +73 kg category. She won the Kyorugi team competition gold medal with Mayerlin Mejía and Madelyn Rodríguez.
