= Olga Ivanova (taekwondo) =

Russian taekwondo practitioner

Medal record

Representing Russia

Women's taekwondo

World Championships
Gold medal – first place	2013 Puebla	+73 kg
Bronze medal – third place	2011 Gyeongju	+73 kg
Bronze medal – third place	2015 Chelyabinsk	+73 kg

European Championships
Silver medal – second place	2014 Baku	+73 kg
Bronze medal – third place	2012 Manchester	+73 kg
Bronze medal – third place	2018 Kazan	+73 kg

Universiade
Bronze medal – third place	2011 Shenzhen	Heavyweight

Grand Prix
Bronze medal – third place	2017 Moscow	+67 kg

Olga Erikovna Ivanova (Russian: Ольга Эриковна Иванова; born 23 March 1993 in Verkhneuralsk) is a Russian taekwondo practitioner.

Ivanova won the gold medal in the women's heavyweight (+73 kg) class at the 2013 World Taekwondo Championships, which was Russia's first gold medal at WTF World Championships. In September 2013, Ivanova rescued a woman from a minor dispute by kicking the attacking man in the stomach, knocking him down for enough time for the victim to walk away.
