= Nuša Vujinović =

Slovenian taekwondo practitioner

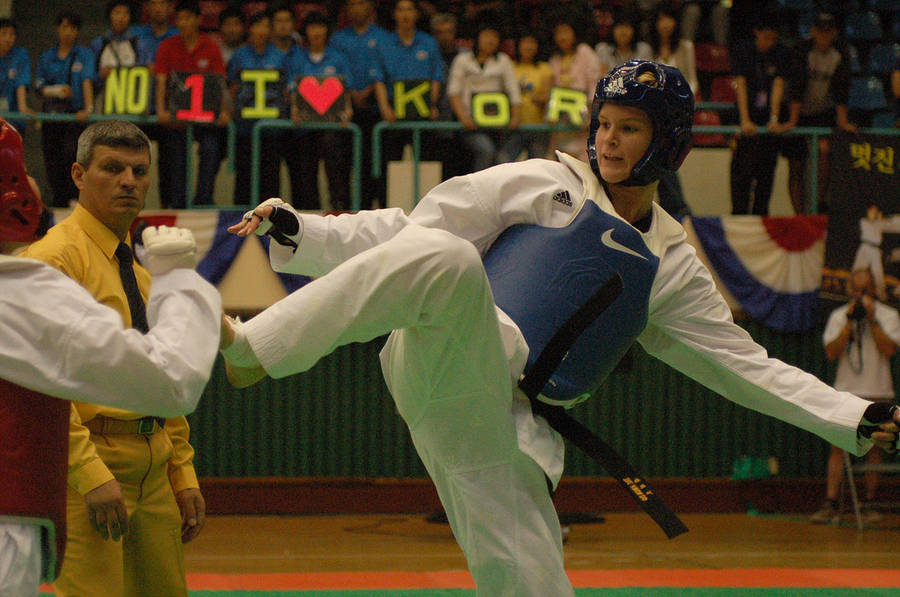

Nuša Vujinović (née Rajher, born 20 July 1983 in Maribor, Slovenia) is a Slovenian taekwondo athlete. She qualified for the 2012 Summer Olympics in the +67 kg category.
