= Wiam Dislam =

Moroccan taekwondo practitioner

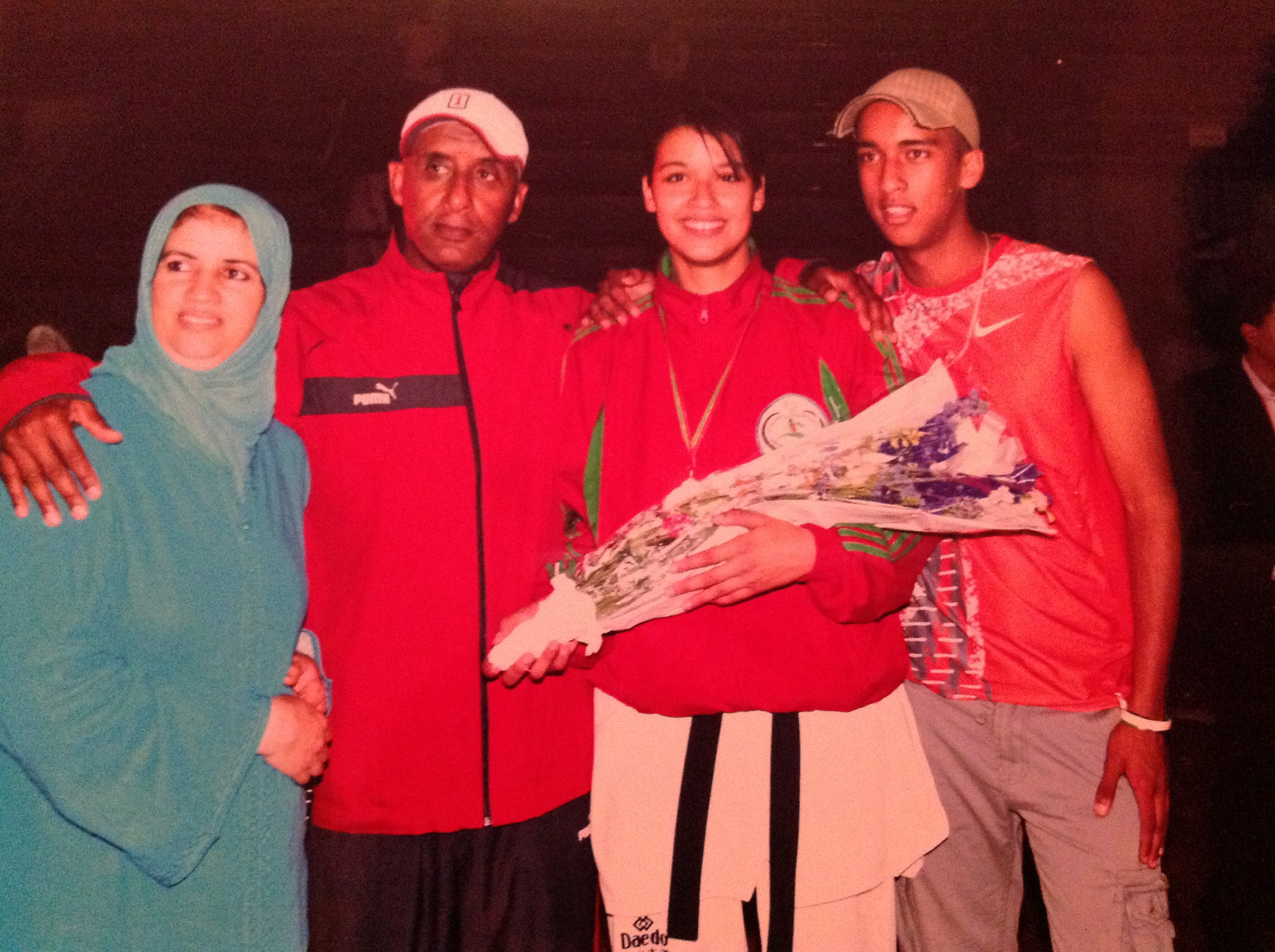
- Familie Dislam

Personal information
- Born: 22 October 1987 (age 38) Rabat, Morocco

Sport
- Country: Morocco
- Sport: Taekwondo
- Weight class: +73 kg
- Rank: first in 2009

Achievements and titles
- Olympic finals: 5th place
- National finals: 12 times

Wiam Dislam (born 22 October 1987 in Rabat, Morocco) is a Moroccan taekwondo practitioner. She stands at 180 cm. She competed in the +67 kg event at the 2012 Summer Olympics and was the flag bearer for Morocco during the opening ceremony.

She competed in the +67 kg event at the 2016 Summer Olympics. She was defeated by Maria Espinoza of Mexico in the quarterfinals. She defeated Kirstie Alora of the Philippines in the repechage and was then defeated by Bianca Walkden of Great Britain in the bronze medal match. She was the flag bearer for Morocco during the closing ceremony. Presently, she is a coach in fujairah martial arts club.

Olympic Games
Preceded by Samir Azzimani	Flag Bearer for Morocco; 2012 London	Succeeded by Adam Lamhamedi
