= Aleksandra Kowalczuk =

Polish taekwondo practitioner

Personal information
- Full name: Aleksandra Kowalczuk
- Nationality: Polish
- Born: 18 December 1996 (age 29) Hrubieszow, Poland
- Height: 185 cm (6 ft 1 in)

Sport
- Sport: Taekwondo
- Event: +73 kg
- Club: Taekwondo AZS Poznań
Medal record
Representing Poland
Grand Prix
Gold medal – first place	2018 Rome	+67 kg
Gold medal – first place	2018 Moscow	+67 kg
Silver medal – second place	2017 London	+67 kg
Bronze medal – third place	2019 Rome	+67 kg
Bronze medal – third place	2019 Manchester	+67 kg
European Championships
Gold medal – first place	2018 Kazan	+73 kg
Silver medal – second place	2021 Sofia	+73 kg
European Games
Silver medal – second place	2023 Kraków–Małopolska	+73 kg
Universiade
Silver medal – second place	2017 Taipei	+73 kg
Bronze medal – third place	2021 Chengdu	Team
European U21 Championships
Silver medal – second place	2016 Grozny	+73 kg
Bronze medal – third place	2015 Bukarest	+73 kg
European Junior Championships
Silver medal – second place	2013 Porto	+68 kg
- Updated on 18 December 2022

Aleksandra Kowalczuk (born 18 December 1996) is a Polish taekwondo practitioner. She is the 2018 European heavyweight champion as she won the gold medal at the 2018 European Taekwondo Championships on the +73 kg weight category beating the world champion Bianca Walkden in the grand final.
