= Rosanna Simón =

Spanish taekwondo practitioner

Personal information
- Full name: Rosanna Simón Álamo
- Born: 11 July 1989 (age 36) Los Llanos de Aridane, Province of Santa Cruz de Tenerife, Canary Islands
- Height: 180 cm (71 in)
- Weight: 74 kg (163 lb)

Sport
- Sport: Taekwondo
Medal record
Representing Spain
Women's taekwondo
World Championships
| Gold medal – first place | 2009 Copenhagen | Heavyweight |
| Bronze medal – third place | 2011 Gyeongju | Heavyweight |
European Championships
| Gold medal – first place | 2010 Saint Petersburg | Heavyweight |
| Bronze medal – third place | 2006 Bonn | Heavyweight |
Mediterranean Games
| Bronze medal – third place | 2013 Mersin | +67 kg |
Summer Universiade
| Bronze medal – third place | 2015 Gwangju | Women's +73kg |

Rosanna Simón Álamo (born 11 July 1989) is a female taekwondo practitioner from Spain.

She won the gold medal in the heavyweight division (+73 kg) at the 2009 World Taekwondo Championships in Copenhagen, Denmark. In the gold medal match, Simón beat Liu Rui of China 6–4, landing a game-leading 3-point kick to the head against the Chinese opponent and knocking her down with 15 seconds left in the final round.
