= Zheng Shuyin =

Chinese taekwondo practitioner (born 1994)

Personal information
- Full name: 郑姝音
- Nationality: Chinese
- Born: 1 May 1994 (age 32) Dandong, China
- Height: 188 cm (6 ft 2 in)
- Weight: 73 kg (161 lb)
- Spouse: Zhao Shuai

Sport
- Sport: Taekwondo
Medal record
Representing China
Women's taekwondo
Olympic Games
Gold medal – first place	2016 Rio de Janeiro	+67 kg
World Championships
Silver medal – second place	2015 Chelyabinsk	Middleweight
Silver medal – second place	2019 Manchester	Heavyweight
Bronze medal – third place	2017 Muju	Heavyweight

Zheng Shuyin (simplified Chinese: 郑姝音; traditional Chinese: 鄭姝音; pinyin: Zhèng Shūyīn; born 1 May 1994) is a Chinese taekwondo athlete.

She represented China at the 2016 Summer Olympics in Rio de Janeiro, in the women's +67 kg, and won the gold medal, which China has not won since 2004 Summer Olympic Games in Athens.

In May 2019 at the 2019 World Taekwondo Championships, Zheng lost the final against Bianca Walkden for the women's heavyweight title. Zheng was disqualified despite leading 20-10 because Walkden repeatedly forced Zheng out of the ring to accumulate Zheng's penalty points.

In September 2019 at Chiba, four months after winning the controversial goal medal in Manchester, Walkden was defeated 7-5 by Zheng Shuyin. In October 2019 at Sofia, Zheng Shuyin defeated Walkden once again by 3-2.

== Career ==
In March 2010, Zheng Shuyin won the women's 68 kg championship at the World Taekwondo Youth Championships in Mexico. In August, Zheng Shuyin represented the Chinese team in the first Youth Olympic Games. She made it all the way and defeated Mexico's Acosta 2:1 in the final to win the women's 63 kg championship.

In October 2011, in the women's 73 kg final of the Seventh City Games, Zheng Shuyin had a bad start and fell behind Xu Hui of the Hefei team 2:4. In the last two games, she hit Xu Hui's head in the scoring area one after another, and finally won Defeated the opponent 19:8.

In September 2013, Zheng Shuyin won the championship in the taekwondo women's 67 kg and above finals of the 12th National Games, defeating Li Donghua 6:2 with a hit to the head. This was also the first time that the Liaoning Taekwondo team won the National Games. gold medal In October, in the taekwondo women's 73 kg and above finals of the Sixth East Asian Games, Zheng Shuyin defeated Peng Jiahui and won a gold medal.

In October 2015, the Taekwondo Grand Prix was held in Manchester. In the women's 67 kg and above finals, Zheng Shuyin defeated the host player in overtime to win the championship. In December, at the Taekwondo World Cup (Team Competition) held in Mexico City, Zheng Shuyin helped the Chinese women's team narrowly defeat the host Mexico team in overtime in the final and win the championship in addition, Zheng Shuyin won the Women's MVP of this World Cup and won the "ticket" for the Rio Olympics.

In August 2016, Zheng Shuyin competed in the women's 67 kg taekwondo competition at the Rio de Janeiro Olympics in Brazil as the No. 2 seed. She defeated Nepal's Laval, France's Epange and the British in the top 16, top 8 and semi-finals. Walkden; in the final, Zheng Shuyin defeated Espinosa 5:1 and won her first Olympic gold medal.

In June 2017, in the semi-finals of the women's 73 kg and above World Taekwondo Championships, Zheng Shuyin unfortunately lost 3:4 and eventually tied for the bronze medal with South Korean player Anseban.

In September, in the overtime match of the women's taekwondo 67 kg final of the 13th National Games, Zheng Shuyin defeated Gao Pan 2:0 and won the championship.

On January 27, 2018, the first Taekwondo World Cup Team Championship, the women’s team final was held between the Chinese team and the South Korean team. The Chinese team, composed of Wenren Yuntao, Zhou Lijun, Zhang Mengyu, Gao Pan and Zheng Shuyin, finally won 53:17.

On September 13, 2019, in the women's 67 kg and above competition at the Taekwondo World Grand Prix in Chiba, Japan, Zheng Shuyin defeated British player Bianca Walkden and won the championship, while gaining 40 Olympic points. Zheng Shuyin has secured a ticket to the Tokyo Olympics. On December 7, in the women's 67 kg and above finals of the World Taekwondo Grand Prix held in Moscow, Russia, Zheng Shuyin defeated Serbian player Mandic and won the championship. On December 20, the World Taekwondo Grand Slam Championship Series concluded in Wuxi. Zheng Shuyin won the bronze medal in the women's 67 kg and above category.

On July 27, 2021, in the quarter-finals of the women's taekwondo over 67 kg category at the Tokyo Olympics, Zheng Shuyin lost to French player Laurine at 6:14.

== Personal life ==
Zheng Shuyin and Chinese taekwondo athlete Zhao Shuai are boyfriend and girlfriend. They met on the Chinese national taekwondo team.

On November 22, 2021, Zhao Shuai successfully proposed to his teammate Zheng Shuyin. The two people who have been in love for ten years will get married.

On June 17, 2023, Zheng Shuyin officially announced on Weibo that she and Zhao Shuai were getting married.

== social activity ==
On August 29, 2016, Zheng Shuyin came to Hong Kong Pui Ching School with the Olympic delegation to conduct a Taekwondo demonstration and sharing. On September 8, Zheng Shuyin went to Baita Primary School for exchanges and taught students Taekwondo.

On October 22, 2023, the 2023 Suzhou Taihu Marathon kicked off on the 22nd, with Zhao Shuai and Zheng Shuyin leading the way.

== See also ==
- List of Olympic medalists in taekwondo
- List of Youth Olympic Games gold medalists who won Olympic gold medals
