= Jade Jones (taekwondo) =

Welsh taekwondo athlete (born 1993)

Jade Jones OBE
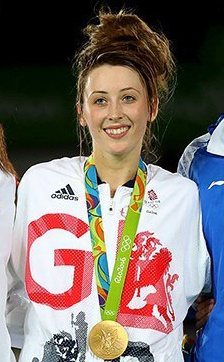
- Jones at the 2016 Olympics

Personal information
- Full name: Jade Louise Jones
- Nickname: The Headhunter
- Born: 21 March 1993 (age 33) Bodelwyddan, Wales
- Height: 167 cm (5 ft 6 in)
- Weight: 57 kg (126 lb)

Sport
- Sport: Taekwondo
- Event: 57 kg
Medal record
Women's taekwondo
Representing Great Britain
Olympic Games
Gold medal – first place	2012 London	57 kg
Gold medal – first place	2016 Rio de Janeiro	57 kg
World Championships
Gold medal – first place	2019 Manchester	57 kg
Silver medal – second place	2011 Gyeongju	57 kg
Bronze medal – third place	2017 Muju	57 kg
Bronze medal – third place	2022 Guadalajara	57 kg
Grand Prix
Gold medal – first place	2014 Querétaro (F)	57 kg
Gold medal – first place	2015 Samsun	57 kg
Gold medal – first place	2015 Manchester	57 kg
Gold medal – first place	2016 Baku (F)	57 kg
Gold medal – first place	2017 London	57 kg
Gold medal – first place	2017 Abidjan (F)	57 kg
Gold medal – first place	2018 Rome	57 kg
Gold medal – first place	2018 Manchester	57 kg
Gold medal – first place	2023 Rome	57 kg
Gold medal – first place	2023 Paris	57 kg
Silver medal – second place	2013 Manchester	57 kg
Silver medal – second place	2014 Astana	57 kg
Silver medal – second place	2014 Manchester	57 kg
Silver medal – second place	2015 Moscow	57 kg
Silver medal – second place	2017 Rabat	57 kg
Silver medal – second place	2022 Rome	57 kg
Silver medal – second place	2022 Manchester	57 kg
Bronze medal – third place	2015 Mexico City (F)	57 kg
European Games
Gold medal – first place	2015 Baku	57 kg
Gold medal – first place	2023 Kraków-Małopolska	57 kg
European Championships
Gold medal – first place	2016 Montreux	57 kg
Gold medal – first place	2018 Kazan	57 kg
Gold medal – first place	2021 Sofia	57 kg
Silver medal – second place	2014 Baku	57 kg
Silver medal – second place	2024 Belgrade	57 kg
Bronze medal – third place	2010 St. Petersburg	53 kg
Bronze medal – third place	2012 Manchester	57 kg
Bronze medal – third place	2022 Manchester	57 kg
Youth Olympic Games
Gold medal – first place	2010 Singapore	55 kg
World Junior Championships
Silver medal – second place	2010 Tijuana	57 kg
- Updated on 10 July 2025

Jade Louise Jones (born 21 March 1993) is a Welsh former taekwondo athlete, who is now competing as a boxer. As a taekwondo competitor in the 57 kg category, she is a two-time Olympic gold medallist (2012, 2016), a one-time world champion (2019), and a three-time European champion (2016, 2018, 2021). Jones also won two gold medals at the European Games and ten gold medals in World Grand Prix events. Her gold medal in 2012 was Great Britain's first ever taekwondo gold medal at an Olympic Games.

After first taking up taekwondo aged eight, Jones had a successful junior career, earning a silver medal at the 2010 World Juniors Championships and a gold medal at the 2010 Youth Olympics. She won her first senior title at the 2011 U.S. Open, and won a silver medal at the senior World Championships the same year. Jones became an Olympic champion in 2012, triumphing in the 57 kg category. In 2014, she won the World Grand Prix finals for the first time, and in 2015 she won gold at the European Games. Jones became a European champion for the first time in 2016, and then successfully defended her Olympic title at the 2016 Games.

Jones won the Grand Prix finals in both 2016 and 2017 and became a European champion for the second time in 2018. She claimed her first world title in 2019 and third European title in 2021. At the delayed 2020 Summer Olympics, she was unable to win a record-breaking third taekwondo gold medal, exiting in the opening round. Jones won more titles in 2023, including at the European Games, but later in the year, she was provisionally suspended for failing to supply a urine sample to UK anti-doping officials, though she was later cleared of any wrongdoing. Jones returned to competition, but was eliminated in the first round at the 2024 Summer Olympics. In March 2025, she announced that she was ending her taekwondo career, and would take up boxing instead.

== Early life ==
Jade Louise Jones was born on 21 March 1993 in Bodelwyddan, Wales. She was introduced to taekwondo by her grandfather who took her to an introductory session at the age of eight. He wanted her to channel her energy productively and she tried swimming, football, badminton and athletics before choosing taekwondo. She began her training at Flint Pavilion Leisure Centre, but after being identified at national level, she regularly travelled to Cardiff for training with the Welsh national squad. Jones attended Flint High School, leaving aged 16 to take up taekwondo full-time. She then trained at the Manchester Aces club before joining British Taekwondo's elite training hub.

== Taekwondo career ==
=== 2010–2012 ===
Jones won a bronze medal in the 53 kg category at the 2010 European Championships in Saint Petersburg, and a silver medal in the World Juniors Taekwondo Championships. Then, with the help of her local community in Flint who raised money for her expenses, she travelled to Mexico to take part in qualifying for the inaugural Summer Youth Olympics. At the Youth Olympics, she beat Vietnam's Than Thao Nguyen in the 55kg category final to become Great Britain's first gold medallist at the Games. At the end of 2010, Jones was named British taekwondo athlete of the year by the British Olympic Association, as well as the BBC Cymru Wales Junior Sportswoman of the Year.

Jones won her first senior title at the U.S. Open in Austin, Texas in February 2011. She won gold in the 62 kg division having won bronze in the 57 kg competition the previous day. She then reached the final of the German Open where she was defeated by Ana Zaninovic. At the 2011 World Championships in Gyeongju, Jones advanced to the final of the 57 kg event after beating Marlène Harnois of France in the semi-finals. She ended the competition with the silver medal after losing the final to China's Hou Yuzhuo to a golden-point in a sudden-death round. (Note: When a contest finishes with the scores tied, the bout enters sudden death with the next scoring strike deciding the outcome. The person who lands the strike receives a golden-point.) In recognition of her progress, Jones was given the Bob Humphrys Award (Note: Named after former BBC Cymru Wales reporter Bob Humphrys, the Bob Humphrys Award is an annual prize chosen from the 12 monthly winners of the Sporting Wales Rising Star awards.) at the SportingWales Rising Star Awards. In October, Jones won a gold medal at the British Open in Manchester by defeating Harnois in the final, before losing to Harnois in the semi-finals of the French Open in December.

At the 2012 German Open in Hamburg, Jones won a silver medal after losing to Yun Wang in the final. She won a bronze medal at the European Championships in Manchester, after being beaten by Hungary's Edina Kotsis. Jones was then selected to compete for Great Britain at the 2012 Summer Olympics in the 57 kg weight category. At the games, Jones beat the top seed Tseng Li-Cheng in the semi-finals, having beaten Mayu Hamada in the quarter-finals. In the final, she beat China's Hou Yuzhuo 6–4 to become the first Briton to win an Olympic taekwondo gold medal. Great Britain's previous best result was a bronze medal achieved by Sarah Stevenson at the 2008 Beijing Olympics.

=== 2013–2016 ===
Jones commenced 2013 with a first-round loss at the Trelleborg Open to Martina Zubcic, but she bounced back in March with victory at the German Open, claiming a win over Daria Zhuravleva in the gold medal match. In July, she lost by a golden-point to Hamada at the 2013 World Championships. With the scores tied at 2–2, their bout entered a sudden-death round and it was Hamada who landed the next strike. Her quarter-final exit left Jones "devastated". At the end of the year, she competed in the World Grand Prix event in Manchester where she finished with a silver medal, after a defeat by Spain's Eva Calvo Gomez. Reflecting back on 2013, Jones said that her defeat at the World Championships, coupled with a back injury, had taken away her enjoyment of the sport, and that she had lost her desire to train. She then stated that by the end of the year she had found her love for the sport again.

In May 2014, Jones won silver at the European Championships in Baku. She led 9–6 against Eva Calvo Gomez but ended up losing the match 9–11. The following month, she won the Swiss Open in Lausanne by defeating Eva Calvo Gomez in the final. In August, Jones won silver at the World Grand Prix series event in Astana, after falling to a golden-point defeat against Eva Calvo Gomez. In October, she reached another final in the World Grand Prix series, this time in Manchester, where she finished with silver after a defeat to Eva Calvo Gomez. She then won the World Grand Prix finals for the first time with a 7‍–‍3 victory over world number one Eva Calvo Gomez in Querétaro, which ended a run of defeats against her opponent.

At the 2015 Swiss Open, Jones won a golden-point to seal a 10‍–‍9 victory against Sweden's Nikita Glasnovic in the 57 kg final after she had earlier trailed 0–8. She was caught up in controversy at the 2015 World Championships in Russia. She was defeated 9–10 by Iranian Kimia Alizadeh at the quarter-finals stage of the event. During their bout, the electronic scoring system crashed when the scores were level at 9–9. At that moment, Jones landed with a shot to the chest and Alizadeh scored on the counter. When the scoreboard reset, Alizadeh's strike had been counted but Jones score had not and she was eliminated from the competition. The following month, she competed at the European Games in Baku, where she triumphed 12–9 over Zaninovic to secure gold. In August, Jones won silver at the first leg of the World Grand Prix series in Moscow, after a defeat against Alizadeh, but the following month she was victorious at the next round of the series in Samsun. There, she claimed a 6–3 victory against Huang Yun-wen to clinch gold. Jones then won another gold at the next round in Manchester, triumphing 14–4 against Eva Calvo Gomez in the final. She finished the World Grand Prix series with a bronze medal in Mexico City.

Jones won gold at the 2016 German Open in April after opponent Ivett Gonda withdrew from the final with injury. The competition marked Jones own return from a knee injury which had caused her to miss several events. In May, she became a European champion for the first time, after claiming an 11–5 victory over Glasnovic in Montreux. At the 2016 Summer Olympics in Rio de Janeiro, Jones won her second Olympic gold medal in the 57 kg division. She progressed to the final with victories over Naima Bakkal, Raheleh Asemani and Glasnovic, before overcoming Eva Calvo Gomez 16–7 in the final, to defend the title she had won four years previously. Afterwards, Jones described how the pressure of being defending champion had left her emotional before her semi-final, saying: "I obviously knew I'd feel some pressure as the reigning Olympic champion but I didn't realise how much it would be." In December, Jones won gold again, this time at the World Grand Prix in Baku. She defeated Egypt's Hedaya Malak 7–0 in the final.

=== 2017–2021 ===
In early 2017, Jones appeared on the winter sports reality TV show The Jump. This was against the wishes of both her coach Paul Green, and British Taekwondo, who were concerned that the show might be dangerous. She returned to taekwondo in April at the President's Cup in Athens, where she claimed gold in the final against Ekaterina Kim. Jones stated that her break from the sport had given her the hunger to compete back. At the 2017 World Championships in Muju, her attempt to win a first World Championship ended with an 8–14 defeat in the semi-finals to South Korea's Lee Ah-reum, giving her a bronze medal instead. Jones then competed in the World Grand Prix series. In Rabat, she was defeated in the final by the Turkish competitor Hatice Kübra İlgün, but she won gold at the next leg of the series in London, triumphing over Lee 31–14 in the final. She then won gold again at the World Grand Prix finals in Côte d'Ivoire, where she overcame Eva Calvo Gomez 26–7. Jones ended the year ranked number one in the world.

Jones began 2018 with a quarter-finals defeat to İrem Yaman at the Grand Slam series in China. Jones then retained her European title with a golden-point victory over Kübra İlgün in Kazan. In June, Jones claimed victory in the World Grand Prix series event in Rome, triumphing over Marta Calvo Gomez 14–12 in the final. She won a further gold in October, at the World Grand Prix event in Manchester, beating Zhou Lijun 11–4 in the final.

Jones became a world champion for the first time at the 2019 World Championships in Manchester. She overcame Lee, the defending champion, 14–7 in the final. Jones said she was "desperate" to win the title and stated that her focus would now be on winning a third consecutive Olympic gold medal.

In February 2020, Jones suffered a knee ligament injury at the President's Cup in Sweden, which forced her to withdraw from the final. In April 2021, Jones became a European champion for the third time after triumphing over Kübra İlgün 20–5 in Sofia. Jones then competed at the delayed 2020 Olympic Games in Tokyo, bidding to become the first competitor to win three Olympic taekwondo gold medals. She was drawn to face Alizadeh of the Refugee Olympic Team in the opening round, and Jones was eliminated, losing 12–16. Reflecting on her loss, Jones said the absence of her family (due to restrictions caused by the COVID-19 pandemic in Japan (Note: The 2021 Summer Olympics took place behind closed doors due to restrictions relating to the COVID-19 pandemic.)), had affected her confidence and that she had felt trapped by fear.

=== 2022–2024 ===
In February 2022, Jones won gold at the President's Cup in Albania. There, she defeated Glasnovic in what was Jones' first competition since her early exit at the Olympics. At the European Championships in Manchester, she finished with a bronze medal after a semi-finals defeat to Patrycja Adamkiewicz. Jones claimed two silver medals during the World Grand Prix series. In Rome, she lost 10–25 to China's Luo Zongshi, and in Manchester she also finished runner-up after she was again beaten by Luo. Jones won a bronze medal at the World Championships in Guadalajara after she suffered another defeat to Luo, this time in the semi-finals.

At the 2023 World Championships, Jones exited in the quarter-finals after a defeat to Lo Chia-ling in Baku. However, she then won gold at the European Games in June, after overcoming Hungary's Luana Marton 2–0 in Krakow. At the World Grand Prix series event in Rome, Jones claimed the gold medal after defeating reigning world champion Nahid Kiyanichandeh of Iran. In the next round of the series in Paris, Jones clinched another gold with a 2–0 victory over Luo.

In December 2023, Jones was provisionally suspended after failing to supply a urine sample when requested by the UK Anti-Doping Agency (UKAD). However, she was cleared to resume competition in July 2024, when UKAD ruled that confidential medical records showed Jones bore "no fault or negligence for her refusal or failure to submit to her sample collection" and stated it was satisfied not to punish her on the "very exceptional circumstances".

Jones finished with silver at the 2024 European Championships in Belgrade, after she was defeated by Croatia's Nika Karabatić. She then headed to Paris for the 2024 Summer Olympics, where she again attempted to become the first person to win three taekwando gold medals. She was unsuccessful, losing to North Macedonia's Miljana Reljiḱ in the last 16. Afterwards, Jones stated: "I came out today, I froze".

== Boxing career ==
On 7 March 2025, Jones announced that she was quitting taekwondo, to take up boxing. She started training with former boxer Stephen Smith, and said that her family thought her decision was "crazy". She stated that she was "dreaming big" and that it was her goal to become a two-sport world champion. Jones made her boxing debut on 7 March 2026 at Vaillant Live in Derby on the MF Duel 2: Mitchell vs. Rosado undercard. She fought Egypt Criss, an American reality star and singer, and Jones won by knockout in the second round.

It was announced that Jones' second bout would feature on the Misfits Tommy Fury vs. Eddie Hall undercard on 13 June at Manchester Arena in Manchester. She boxed FederiKita, an Argentinian influencer. and won the bout by technical knockout in the second round.

In July, Misfits Boxing announced that Jones would face Hungarian MMA fighter Sheena Bathory for the inaugural MFB women's super middleweight title on the Jordan McCann vs. Big Stacks undercard for 12 September. (Note: Founded by KSI in 2021, Misfits Boxing is not recognized as one of the world sanctioning bodies as of 2026.) The bout took place at the Utilita Arena in Newcastle upon Tyne, which she won via corner retirement in the fourth round.

== Personal life ==
After Jones won gold at the 2012 Summer Olympics, a post box in her hometown of Flint was painted gold to recognize her success. Her victory at the Olympics was also commemorated on a stamp released by the Royal Mail; one of a set featuring British gold medallists from the 2012 Games. In addition, Flint Pavilion Leisure Centre, where she first took up taekwondo, was renamed the Jade Jones Pavilion Flint.

Jones won the public vote for the BBC Wales Sports Personality of the Year in both 2012 and 2016. She was appointed Member of the Order of the British Empire (MBE) in the 2013 New Year Honours for services to taekwondo and Officer of the Order of the British Empire (OBE) in the 2020 New Year Honours for services to taekwondo and sport.

During the COVID-19 lockdown in England, she lived with her friend and fellow Olympic taekwondo competitor Bianca Walkden. They converted their garage into a gym and trained together.

Jones appeared on series four of Celebs Go Dating, which was broadcast in 2018, and SAS: Who Dares Wins in 2022. In August 2024, it was reported that Jones was in a relationship with former taekwondo athlete Jordan Gayle. In 2026, she announced that she had been diagnosed with attention deficit hyperactivity disorder (ADHD).

In July 2026, Jones co-founded wellness brand JJ Double Gold with entrepreneur Richard Groves.

== Medals in taekwondo ==
Year	Event	Location	Place	Ref
2010	European Championships	St Petersburg	3rd	
2011	World Championships	Gyeongju	2nd	
2012	European Championships	Manchester	3rd	
2012	Summer Olympics	London	1st	
2013	World Grand Prix	Manchester	2nd	
2014	European Championships	Baku	2nd	
2014	World Grand Prix	Astana	2nd	
2014	World Grand Prix	Manchester	2nd	
2014	World Grand Prix	Querétaro	1st	
2015	European Games	Baku	1st	
2015	World Grand Prix	Moscow	2nd	
2015	World Grand Prix	Samsun	1st	
2015	World Grand Prix	Manchester	1st	
2015	World Grand Prix	Mexico City	3rd	
2016	European Championships	Montreux	1st	
2016	Summer Olympics	Rio de Janeiro	1st	
2016	World Grand Prix	Baku	1st	
2017	World Championships	Muju	3rd	
2017	World Grand Prix	Rabat	2nd	
2017	World Grand Prix	London	1st	
2017	World Grand Prix	Abidjan	1st	
2018	European Championships	Kazan	1st	
2018	World Grand Prix	Rome	1st	
2018	World Grand Prix	Manchester	1st	
2019	World Championships	Manchester	1st	
2021	European Championships	Sofia	1st	
2022	European Championships	Manchester	3rd	
2022	World Grand Prix	Rome	2nd	
2022	World Grand Prix	Manchester	2nd	
2022	World Championships	Guadalajara	3rd	
2023	European Games	Kraków	1st	
2023	World Grand Prix	Rome	1st	
2023	World Grand Prix	Paris	1st	
2024	European Championships	Belgrade	2nd	

== MF–Professional boxing record ==
3 fights	3 wins	0 losses
By knockout	3	0

No.	Result	Record	Opponent	Type	Round, time	Date	Location	Notes
3	Win	3–0	Sheena Bathory	RTD	4 (5), 2:00	12 Sep 2026	Newcastle Arena, Newcastle upon Tyne, England	Won inaugural MFB women's super middleweight title
2	Win	2–0	FederiKita	TKO	2 (4), 0:59	13 Jun 2026	Manchester Arena, Manchester, England	
1	Win	1–0	Egypt Criss	KO	2 (4), 0:59	7 Mar 2026	Vaillant Live, Derby, England	

== See also ==
- 2012 Olympics gold post boxes in the United Kingdom
- List of Youth Olympic Games gold medalists who won Olympic gold medals
