= 2015 World Taekwondo Championships – Women's featherweight =

Taekwondo competition

Women's featherweight at the 2015 World Championships
- Venue: Traktor Ice Arena
- Dates: 17–18 May 2015
- Competitors: 51 from 51 nations

Medalists
gold medal	Mayu Hamada	Japan
silver medal	Eva Calvo	Spain
bronze medal	Kimia Alizadeh	Iran
bronze medal	Edina Kotsis	Hungary

The women's featherweight is a competition featured at the 2015 World Taekwondo Championships, and was held at the Traktor Ice Arena in Chelyabinsk, Russia on May 17 and May 18. Featherweights were limited to a maximum of 57 kilograms in body mass.

== Results ==
Legend

- DQ — Won by disqualification

=== Finals ===
Semifinals		Final
Kimia Alizadeh (IRI)	3
Mayu Hamada (JPN)	5	Mayu Hamada (JPN)	5
Edina Kotsis (HUN)	2	Eva Calvo (ESP)	3
Eva Calvo (ESP)	4

=== Top half ===
==== Section 1 ====
Round of 64
Tshepang Koosenye (BOT)	3
Adriana Martínez (VEN)	25
Gunay Aghakishiyeva (AZE)	10
Carolena Carstens (PAN)	2
Chen Yu-chuang (TPE)	14
Doris Patiño (COL)	6
Oleksandra Baranova (UKR)	9
Bat-El Gatterer (ISR)	10
Kimia Alizadeh (IRI)	10
Magdalena Leporowska (POL)	0

Round of 32
Jade Jones (GBR)	7
Adriana Martínez (VEN)	1
Gunay Aghakishiyeva (AZE)	5
Chen Yu-chuang (TPE)	10
Cheyenne Lewis (USA)	13
Bat-El Gatterer (ISR)	2
Kimia Alizadeh (IRI)	4
Martina Zubčić (CRO)	3

Round of 16
Jade Jones (GBR)	7
Chen Yu-chuang (TPE)	1
Cheyenne Lewis (USA)	4
Kimia Alizadeh (IRI)	5

Quarterfinals
Jade Jones (GBR)	9
Kimia Alizadeh (IRI)	10

==== Section 2 ====
Round of 64
Phạm Thị Thu Hiền (VIE)	4
Assel Koilybay (KAZ)	3
~~Emely Cartagena (PUR)~~
Kim Da-yeong (KOR)	DQ
Belén Costa (PER)	5
Rangsiya Nisaisom (THA)	9
Celina Proffen (ARG)	DQ
~~Tasneem Tawil (LBA)~~

Round of 32
Mayu Hamada (JPN)	8
Phạm Thị Thu Hiền (VIE)	5
Kim Da-yeong (KOR)	5
Josiane Lima (BRA)	3
Bineta Diédhiou (SEN)	2
Rangsiya Nisaisom (THA)	13
Celina Proffen (ARG)	5
Milana Driamova (RUS)	6

Round of 16
Mayu Hamada (JPN)	6
Kim Da-yeong (KOR)	5
Rangsiya Nisaisom (THA)	5
Milana Driamova (RUS)	1

Quarterfinals
Mayu Hamada (JPN)	9
Rangsiya Nisaisom (THA)	2

=== Bottom half ===
==== Section 3 ====
Round of 64
Sabra Al-Salti (OMA)	2
Aleksandra Radmilović (SRB)	14
Edina Kotsis (HUN)	12
Jui Anil Zodage (IND)	5
Laurygan Célin (FRA)	5
Joana Cunha (POR)	5
María Jara (CHI)	1
Paulina Armería (MEX)	15
Naima Bakkal (MAR)	9
Sarah Dad (ALG)	6

Round of 32
Nikita Glasnović (SWE)	7
Aleksandra Radmilović (SRB)	1
Edina Kotsis (HUN)	5
Laurygan Célin (FRA)	0
Hou Yuzhuo (CHN)	2
Paulina Armería (MEX)	1
Naima Bakkal (MAR)	4
Hedaya Malak (EGY)	8

Round of 16
Nikita Glasnović (SWE)	2
Edina Kotsis (HUN)	5
Hou Yuzhuo (CHN)	1
Hedaya Malak (EGY)	3

Quarterfinals
Edina Kotsis (HUN)	14
Hedaya Malak (EGY)	13

==== Section 4 ====
Round of 64
Humaira Mohammadi (AFG)	3
Marah Al-Sqour (JOR)	7
Cristina Gaspa (ITA)	2
Stavroula Kontou (GRE)	3
Dürdane Altunel (TUR)	13
Catherine Risbey (AUS)	1
Darya Zubovich (BLR)	5
Banassa Diomandé (CIV)	3
Claire Toland (IRL)	2
Gabija Janušauskaitė (LTU)	9

Round of 32
Evelyn Gonda (CAN)	10
Marah Al-Sqour (JOR)	5
Stavroula Kontou (GRE)	4
Anna-Lena Frömming (GER)	8
Dürdane Altunel (TUR)	5
Darya Zubovich (BLR)	6
Gabija Janušauskaitė (LTU)	0
Eva Calvo (ESP)	12

Round of 16
Evelyn Gonda (CAN)	5
Anna-Lena Frömming (GER)	11
Darya Zubovich (BLR)	3
Eva Calvo (ESP)	9

Quarterfinals
Anna-Lena Frömming (GER)	4
Eva Calvo (ESP)	6
