= 2013 World Taekwondo Championships – Women's featherweight =

Taekwondo competition

Women's featherweight at the 2013 World Championships
- Venue: Exhibition Center of Puebla
- Dates: 20 July 2013
- Competitors: 49 from 48 nations

Medalists
gold medal	Kim So-hee	South Korea
silver medal	Mayu Hamada	Japan
bronze medal	Anna-Lena Frömming	Germany
bronze medal	Eva Calvo	Spain

The women's featherweight is a competition featured at the 2013 World Taekwondo Championships, and was held at the Exhibition Center of Puebla in Puebla, Mexico on July 20. Featherweights were limited to a maximum of 57 kilograms in body mass.

== Results ==
- DQ — Won by disqualification
- W — Won by withdrawal

=== Finals ===
Semifinals		Final
Anna-Lena Frömming (GER)	7
Kim So-hee (KOR)	13	Kim So-hee (KOR)	15
Eva Calvo (ESP)	2	Mayu Hamada (JPN)	8
Mayu Hamada (JPN)	3

=== Top half ===
==== Section 1 ====
Round of 64
~~Sanaa Oyoo (KEN)~~
Katerina Artemiou (CYP)	DQ
Jade Zafra (PHI)	5
Ruxandra Rodgers (CAN)	6
~~Stelly Mekui (GAB)~~
Nicole Palma (USA)	DQ
Gyani Chunara (NEP)	5
Anna-Lena Frömming (GER)	11
Pakkapa Pongpanit (THA)	8
Evangelia Vetsiou (GRE)	12

Round of 32
Hou Yuzhuo (CHN)	W
Katerina Artemiou (CYP)
Ruxandra Rodgers (CAN)	5
Nicole Palma (USA)	6
Rafaela Araújo (BRA)	5
Anna-Lena Frömming (GER)	7
Evangelia Vetsiou (GRE)	15
Bat-El Gatterer (ISR)	1

Round of 16
Hou Yuzhuo (CHN)	6
Nicole Palma (USA)	5
Anna-Lena Frömming (GER)	3
Evangelia Vetsiou (GRE)	1

Quarterfinals
Hou Yuzhuo (CHN)	2
Anna-Lena Frömming (GER)	5

==== Section 2 ====
Round of 64
Shahd Al-Tarman (JOR)	13
Venu Reshma (WTF)	0
Malika Zhandayeva (KAZ)	2
Kim So-hee (KOR)	15
Sanele Ginindza (SWZ)	DQ
~~Maryam Abdullahi (NGR)~~
Carla Salinas (ARG)	0
Gunay Aghakishiyeva (AZE)	0

Round of 32
Chynea Lang (AUS)	16
Shahd Al-Tarman (JOR)	17
Kim So-hee (KOR)	DQ
~~Laura Vásquez (ESA)~~
Jessica Chávez (MEX)	4^{W}
Sanele Ginindza (SWZ)	0
Gunay Aghakishiyeva (AZE)	22
Andrea Paoli (LIB)	12

Round of 16
Shahd Al-Tarman (JOR)	1
Kim So-hee (KOR)	13
Jessica Chávez (MEX)	3
Gunay Aghakishiyeva (AZE)	8

Quarterfinals
Kim So-hee (KOR)	15
Gunay Aghakishiyeva (AZE)	4

=== Bottom half ===
==== Section 3 ====
Round of 64
Adriana Martínez (VEN)	6
Lâm Thị Hà Thanh (VIE)	0
Daria Zhuravleva (RUS)	13
Coralia Abadía (GUA)	7
Estelle Vander-Zwalm (FRA)	15
Sherelle De Bourgh (TTO)	0
Eva Calvo (ESP)	13
Hatice Kübra İlgün (TUR)	5

Round of 32
Bineta Diédhiou (SEN)	12
Adriana Martínez (VEN)	7
Daria Zhuravleva (RUS)	14
Edina Kotsis (HUN)	8
Nikita Glasnović (SWE)	3
Estelle Vander-Zwalm (FRA)	2
Eva Calvo (ESP)	9
Doris Patiño (COL)	3

Round of 16
Bineta Diédhiou (SEN)	4
Daria Zhuravleva (RUS)	6
Nikita Glasnović (SWE)	7
Eva Calvo (ESP)	8

Quarterfinals
Daria Zhuravleva (RUS)	1
Eva Calvo (ESP)	8

==== Section 4 ====
Round of 64
Deborah Louz (NED)	2
Kuan I-wen (TPE)	5
Banassa Diomandé (CIV)	1
Darya Zubovich (BLR)	4
Elizabeth Alvarado (PER)	7
Amanda Sánchez (CRC)	8
Sousan Hajipour (IRI)	9
Dilobar Saydullaeva (UZB)	7

Round of 32
Mayu Hamada (JPN)	11
Kuan I-wen (TPE)	3
Darya Zubovich (BLR)	2
Emely Cartagena (PUR)	6
Martina Zubčić (CRO)	12
Amanda Sánchez (CRC)	3
Sousan Hajipour (IRI)	4
Jade Jones (GBR)	7

Round of 16
Mayu Hamada (JPN)	5
Emely Cartagena (PUR)	3
Martina Zubčić (CRO)	2
Jade Jones (GBR)	12

Quarterfinals
Mayu Hamada (JPN)	3
Jade Jones (GBR)	2
