= 2014 World Taekwondo Grand Prix =

Taekwondo competition

The 2014 World Taekwondo Grand Prix was the 2nd edition of the World Taekwondo Grand Prix series.

== Timeline ==
Event	Date	Venue	Ref.
Series 1	July 4–6	Suzhou, China	
Series 2	August 29–31	Astana, Kazakhstan	
Series 3	October 24–26	Manchester, United Kingdom	
Final	December 3–4	Querétaro, Mexico	

== Men ==
=== 58 kg ===
Event	Gold	Silver	Bronze
Suzhou	Kim Tae-hun (KOR)	Guilherme Dias (BRA)	Lucas Guzmán (ARG)
Suzhou	Kim Tae-hun (KOR)	Guilherme Dias (BRA)	Safwan Khalil (AUS)
Astana	Wei Chen-yang (TPE)	Farzan Ashourzadeh (IRI)	Lucas Guzmán (ARG)
Astana	Wei Chen-yang (TPE)	Farzan Ashourzadeh (IRI)	Safwan Khalil (AUS)
Manchester	Farzan Ashourzadeh (IRI)	Zhao Shuai (CHN)	César Rodríguez (MEX)
Manchester	Farzan Ashourzadeh (IRI)	Zhao Shuai (CHN)	Rui Bragança (POR)
Querétaro	Farzan Ashourzadeh (IRI)	Cha Tae-moon (KOR)	Kim Tae-hun (KOR)

=== 68 kg ===
Event	Gold	Silver	Bronze
Suzhou	Lee Dae-hoon (KOR)	Vasily Nikitin (RUS)	Behnam Asbaghi (IRI)
Suzhou	Lee Dae-hoon (KOR)	Vasily Nikitin (RUS)	Huang Jiannan (CHN)
Astana	Aleksey Denisenko (RUS)	Mark López (USA)	Behnam Asbaghi (IRI)
Astana	Aleksey Denisenko (RUS)	Mark López (USA)	José Antonio Rosillo (ESP)
Manchester	Lee Dae-hoon (KOR)	Jaouad Achab (BEL)	Huang Jiannan (CHN)
Manchester	Lee Dae-hoon (KOR)	Jaouad Achab (BEL)	Mark López (USA)
Querétaro	Aleksey Denisenko (RUS)	Joel González (ESP)	Behnam Asbaghi (IRI)

=== 80 kg ===
Event	Gold	Silver	Bronze
Suzhou	Aaron Cook (IMN)	Albert Gaun (RUS)	Sebastián Crismanich (ARG)
Suzhou	Aaron Cook (IMN)	Albert Gaun (RUS)	Torann Maizeroi (FRA)
Astana	Mehdi Khodabakhshi (IRI)	Steven López (USA)	Damon Sansum (GBR)
Astana	Mehdi Khodabakhshi (IRI)	Steven López (USA)	Torann Maizeroi (FRA)
Manchester	Mehdi Khodabakhshi (IRI)	Aaron Cook (IMN)	Tahir Güleç (GER)
Manchester	Mehdi Khodabakhshi (IRI)	Aaron Cook (IMN)	Masoud Hajji-Zavareh (IRI)
Querétaro	Albert Gaun (RUS)	Mehdi Khodabakhshi (IRI)	Sebastián Crismanich (ARG)

=== +80 kg ===
Event	Gold	Silver	Bronze
Suzhou	Anthony Obame (GAB)	Cha Dong-min (KOR)	Sajjad Mardani (IRI)
Suzhou	Anthony Obame (GAB)	Cha Dong-min (KOR)	Mahama Cho (GBR)
Astana	M'Bar N'Diaye (FRA)	Mahama Cho (GBR)	Arman-Marshall Silla (BLR)
Astana	M'Bar N'Diaye (FRA)	Mahama Cho (GBR)	Jasur Baykuziyev (UZB)
Manchester	Volker Wodzich (GER)	Jasur Baykuziyev (UZB)	Sajjad Mardani (IRI)
Manchester	Volker Wodzich (GER)	Jasur Baykuziyev (UZB)	Arman-Marshall Silla (BLR)
Querétaro	Cha Dong-min (KOR)	Jasur Baykuziyev (UZB)	Sajjad Mardani (IRI)

== Women ==
=== 49 kg ===
Event	Gold	Silver	Bronze
Suzhou	Wu Jingyu (CHN)	Yasmina Aziez (FRA)	Kim So-hui (KOR)
Suzhou	Wu Jingyu (CHN)	Yasmina Aziez (FRA)	Ivett Gonda (HUN)
Astana	Lucija Zaninović (CRO)	Kim Jae-ah (KOR)	Lin Wan-ting (TPE)
Astana	Lucija Zaninović (CRO)	Kim Jae-ah (KOR)	Ganna Soroka (UKR)
Manchester	Brigitte Yagüe (ESP)	Ivett Gonda (HUN)	Lucija Zaninović (CRO)
Manchester	Brigitte Yagüe (ESP)	Ivett Gonda (HUN)	Yasmina Aziez (FRA)
Querétaro	Lucija Zaninović (CRO)	Brigitte Yagüe (ESP)	Yasmina Aziez (FRA)

=== 57 kg ===
Event	Gold	Silver	Bronze
Suzhou	Eva Calvo (ESP)	Kim So-hee (KOR)	Mayu Hamada (JPN)
Suzhou	Eva Calvo (ESP)	Kim So-hee (KOR)	Tseng Li-cheng (TPE)
Astana	Eva Calvo (ESP)	Jade Jones (GBR)	Kim So-hee (KOR)
Astana	Eva Calvo (ESP)	Jade Jones (GBR)	Ana Zaninović (CRO)
Manchester	Eva Calvo (ESP)	Jade Jones (GBR)	Lee Ah-reum (KOR)
Manchester	Eva Calvo (ESP)	Jade Jones (GBR)	Mayu Hamada (JPN)
Querétaro	Jade Jones (GBR)	Eva Calvo (ESP)	Mayu Hamada (JPN)

=== 67 kg ===
Event	Gold	Silver	Bronze
Suzhou	Chuang Chia-chia (TPE)	Anastasia Baryshnikova (RUS)	Zhang Hua (CHN)
Suzhou	Chuang Chia-chia (TPE)	Anastasia Baryshnikova (RUS)	Farida Azizova (AZE)
Astana	Guo Yunfei (CHN)	Elin Johansson (SWE)	Anastasia Baryshnikova (RUS)
Astana	Guo Yunfei (CHN)	Elin Johansson (SWE)	Chen Yann-yeu (TPE)
Manchester	Anastasia Baryshnikova (RUS)	Elin Johansson (SWE)	Nur Tatar (TUR)
Manchester	Anastasia Baryshnikova (RUS)	Elin Johansson (SWE)	Farida Azizova (AZE)
Querétaro	Elin Johansson (SWE)	Haby Niaré (FRA)	Anastasia Baryshnikova (RUS)

=== +67 kg ===
Event	Gold	Silver	Bronze
Suzhou	Zheng Shuyin (CHN)	Briseida Acosta (MEX)	Bianca Walkden (GBR)
Suzhou	Zheng Shuyin (CHN)	Briseida Acosta (MEX)	Milica Mandić (SRB)
Astana	Jackie Galloway (USA)	Li Donghua (CHN)	Lee In-jong (KOR)
Astana	Jackie Galloway (USA)	Li Donghua (CHN)	Rosana Simón (ESP)
Manchester	Milica Mandić (SRB)	Reshmie Oogink (NED)	Lee In-jong (KOR)
Manchester	Milica Mandić (SRB)	Reshmie Oogink (NED)	Furkan Asena Aydın (TUR)
Querétaro	Reshmie Oogink (NED)	María Espinoza (MEX)	Anne-Caroline Graffe (FRA)

== Medal table ==
Rank	Nation	Gold	Silver	Bronze	Total
1	South Korea (KOR)	4	4	6	14
2	Russia (RUS)	4	3	2	9
2	Spain (ESP)	4	3	2	9
4	Iran (IRI)	4	2	7	13
5	China (CHN)	3	2	3	8
6	Chinese Taipei (TPE)	2	0	3	5
7	Croatia (CRO)	2	0	2	4
8	Great Britain (GBR)	1	3	3	7
9	France (FRA)	1	2	5	8
10	United States (USA)	1	2	1	4
11	Sweden (SWE)	1	2	0	3
12	Isle of Man (IMN)	1	1	0	2
12	Netherlands (NED)	1	1	0	2
14	Germany (GER)	1	0	1	2
14	Serbia (SRB)	1	0	1	2
16	Gabon (GAB)	1	0	0	1
17	Mexico (MEX)	0	2	1	3
17	Uzbekistan (UZB)	0	2	1	3
19	Hungary (HUN)	0	1	1	2
20	Belgium (BEL)	0	1	0	1
20	Brazil (BRA)	0	1	0	1
22	Argentina (ARG)	0	0	4	4
23	Japan (JPN)	0	0	3	3
24	Australia (AUS)	0	0	2	2
24	Azerbaijan (AZE)	0	0	2	2
24	Belarus (BLR)	0	0	2	2
24	Turkey (TUR)	0	0	2	2
28	Portugal (POR)	0	0	1	1
28	Ukraine (UKR)	0	0	1	1
Totals (29 entries)		32	32	56	120
