= 2015 World Taekwondo Grand Prix =

Taekwondo competition

The 2015 World Taekwondo Grand Prix was the 3rd edition of the World Taekwondo Grand Prix series.

== Timeline ==
Event	Date	Venue	Ref.
Series 1	August 14–16	Moscow, Russia	
Series 2	September 18–20	Samsun, Turkey	
Series 3	October 15–17	Manchester, United Kingdom	
Final	December 5–6	Mexico City, Mexico	

== Men ==
=== 58 kg ===
Event	Gold	Silver	Bronze
Moscow	Farzan Ashourzadeh (IRI)	Carlos Navarro (MEX)	Levent Tuncat (GER)
Moscow	Farzan Ashourzadeh (IRI)	Carlos Navarro (MEX)	Kim Tae-hun (KOR)
Samsun	Rui Bragança (POR)	Levent Tuncat (GER)	Zhao Shuai (CHN)
Samsun	Rui Bragança (POR)	Levent Tuncat (GER)	Lucas Guzmán (ARG)
Manchester	Nursultan Mamayev (KAZ)	Jesús Tortosa (ESP)	Farzan Ashourzadeh (IRI)
Manchester	Nursultan Mamayev (KAZ)	Jesús Tortosa (ESP)	Kim Tae-hun (KOR)
Mexico City	Kim Tae-hun (KOR)	Farzan Ashourzadeh (IRI)	César Rodríguez (MEX)

=== 68 kg ===
Event	Gold	Silver	Bronze
Moscow	Kim Hun (KOR)	Lee Dae-hoon (KOR)	Abolfazl Yaghoubi (IRI)
Moscow	Kim Hun (KOR)	Lee Dae-hoon (KOR)	Maksim Khramtsov (RUS)
Samsun	Aleksey Denisenko (RUS)	Saúl Gutiérrez (MEX)	Abolfazl Yaghoubi (IRI)
Samsun	Aleksey Denisenko (RUS)	Saúl Gutiérrez (MEX)	Lee Dae-hoon (KOR)
Manchester	Lee Dae-hoon (KOR)	Abolfazl Yaghoubi (IRI)	Servet Tazegül (TUR)
Manchester	Lee Dae-hoon (KOR)	Abolfazl Yaghoubi (IRI)	Kim Hun (KOR)
Mexico City	Lee Dae-hoon (KOR)	Saúl Gutiérrez (MEX)	Jaouad Achab (BEL)

=== 80 kg ===
Event	Gold	Silver	Bronze
Moscow	Cheick Sallah Cissé (CIV)	Aaron Cook (MDA)	Ismaël Coulibaly (MLI)
Moscow	Cheick Sallah Cissé (CIV)	Aaron Cook (MDA)	Steven López (USA)
Samsun	Mehdi Khodabakhshi (IRI)	Cheick Sallah Cissé (CIV)	Masoud Hajji-Zavareh (IRI)
Samsun	Mehdi Khodabakhshi (IRI)	Cheick Sallah Cissé (CIV)	Roberto Botta (ITA)
Manchester	Oussama Oueslati (TUN)	Lutalo Muhammad (GBR)	Mehdi Khodabakhshi (IRI)
Manchester	Oussama Oueslati (TUN)	Lutalo Muhammad (GBR)	Cheick Sallah Cissé (CIV)
Mexico City	Lutalo Muhammad (GBR)	Aaron Cook (MDA)	Masoud Hajji-Zavareh (IRI)

=== +80 kg ===
Event	Gold	Silver	Bronze
Moscow	Dmitriy Shokin (UZB)	Vladislav Larin (RUS)	Jo Chol-ho (KOR)
Moscow	Dmitriy Shokin (UZB)	Vladislav Larin (RUS)	Mahama Cho (GBR)
Samsun	Jo Chol-ho (KOR)	Sajjad Mardani (IRI)	Volker Wodzich (GER)
Samsun	Jo Chol-ho (KOR)	Sajjad Mardani (IRI)	Dmitriy Shokin (UZB)
Manchester	Dmitriy Shokin (UZB)	Rafael Alba (CUB)	Arman-Marshall Silla (BLR)
Manchester	Dmitriy Shokin (UZB)	Rafael Alba (CUB)	Omid Amidi (IRI)
Mexico City	Sajjad Mardani (IRI)	M'Bar N'Diaye (FRA)	Jasur Baykuziyev (UZB)

== Women ==
=== 49 kg ===
Event	Gold	Silver	Bronze
Moscow	Kim So-hui (KOR)	Li Zhaoyi (CHN)	Rukiye Yıldırım (TUR)
Moscow	Kim So-hui (KOR)	Li Zhaoyi (CHN)	Tijana Bogdanović (SRB)
Samsun	Wu Jingyu (CHN)	Panipak Wongpattanakit (THA)	Svetlana Igumenova (RUS)
Samsun	Wu Jingyu (CHN)	Panipak Wongpattanakit (THA)	Yasmina Aziez (FRA)
Manchester	Wu Jingyu (CHN)	Chanatip Sonkham (THA)	Patimat Abakarova (AZE)
Manchester	Wu Jingyu (CHN)	Chanatip Sonkham (THA)	Tijana Bogdanović (SRB)
Mexico City	Wu Jingyu (CHN)	Yasmina Aziez (FRA)	Panipak Wongpattanakit (THA)

=== 57 kg ===
Event	Gold	Silver	Bronze
Moscow	Kimia Alizadeh (IRI)	Jade Jones (GBR)	Martina Zubčić (CRO)
Moscow	Kimia Alizadeh (IRI)	Jade Jones (GBR)	Hedaya Malak (EGY)
Samsun	Jade Jones (GBR)	Huang Yun-wen (TPE)	Rachelle Booth (GBR)
Samsun	Jade Jones (GBR)	Huang Yun-wen (TPE)	Nikita Glasnović (SWE)
Manchester	Jade Jones (GBR)	Eva Calvo (ESP)	Nikita Glasnović (SWE)
Manchester	Jade Jones (GBR)	Eva Calvo (ESP)	Mayu Hamada (JPN)
Mexico City	Hedaya Malak (EGY)	Eva Calvo (ESP)	Jade Jones (GBR)

=== 67 kg ===
Event	Gold	Silver	Bronze
Moscow	Oh Hye-ri (KOR)	Melissa Pagnotta (CAN)	Farida Azizova (AZE)
Moscow	Oh Hye-ri (KOR)	Melissa Pagnotta (CAN)	Seham El-Sawalhy (EGY)
Samsun	Anastasia Baryshnikova (RUS)	Zhang Hua (CHN)	İrem Yaman (TUR)
Samsun	Anastasia Baryshnikova (RUS)	Zhang Hua (CHN)	Nur Tatar (TUR)
Manchester	Haby Niaré (FRA)	Nur Tatar (TUR)	Oh Hye-ri (KOR)
Manchester	Haby Niaré (FRA)	Nur Tatar (TUR)	Chuang Chia-chia (TPE)
Mexico City	Haby Niaré (FRA)	Nur Tatar (TUR)	Zhang Hua (CHN)

=== +67 kg ===
Event	Gold	Silver	Bronze
Moscow	Nafia Kuş (TUR)	Li Donghua (CHN)	Bianca Walkden (GBR)
Moscow	Nafia Kuş (TUR)	Li Donghua (CHN)	Gwladys Épangue (FRA)
Samsun	Jackie Galloway (USA)	Bianca Walkden (GBR)	Petra Matijašević (MKD)
Samsun	Jackie Galloway (USA)	Bianca Walkden (GBR)	Iva Radoš (CRO)
Manchester	Zheng Shuyin (CHN)	Bianca Walkden (GBR)	Milica Mandić (SRB)
Manchester	Zheng Shuyin (CHN)	Bianca Walkden (GBR)	Nafia Kuş (TUR)
Mexico City	Zheng Shuyin (CHN)	María Espinoza (MEX)	Reshmie Oogink (NED)

== Medal table ==
Rank	Nation	Gold	Silver	Bronze	Total
1	South Korea (KOR)	7	1	6	14
2	China (CHN)	5	3	2	10
3	Iran (IRI)	4	3	7	14
4	Great Britain (GBR)	3	4	4	11
5	France (FRA)	2	2	2	6
6	Russia (RUS)	2	1	2	5
7	Uzbekistan (UZB)	2	0	2	4
8	Turkey (TUR)	1	2	5	8
9	Ivory Coast (CIV)	1	1	1	3
10	Egypt (EGY)	1	0	2	3
11	United States (USA)	1	0	1	2
12	Kazakhstan (KAZ)	1	0	0	1
12	Portugal (POR)	1	0	0	1
12	Tunisia (TUN)	1	0	0	1
15	Mexico (MEX)	0	4	1	5
16	Spain (ESP)	0	3	0	3
17	Thailand (THA)	0	2	1	3
18	Moldova (MDA)	0	2	0	2
19	Germany (GER)	0	1	2	3
20	Chinese Taipei (TPE)	0	1	1	2
21	Canada (CAN)	0	1	0	1
21	Cuba (CUB)	0	1	0	1
23	Serbia (SRB)	0	0	3	3
24	Azerbaijan (AZE)	0	0	2	2
24	Croatia (CRO)	0	0	2	2
24	Sweden (SWE)	0	0	2	2
27	Argentina (ARG)	0	0	1	1
27	Belarus (BLR)	0	0	1	1
27	Belgium (BEL)	0	0	1	1
27	Italy (ITA)	0	0	1	1
27	Japan (JPN)	0	0	1	1
27	Mali (MLI)	0	0	1	1
27	Netherlands (NED)	0	0	1	1
27	North Macedonia (MKD)	0	0	1	1
Totals (34 entries)		32	32	56	120
