= 2011 World Taekwondo Championships – Women's featherweight =

Taekwondo competition

Women's featherweight at the 2011 World Championships
- Venue: Gyeongju Indoor Stadium
- Dates: 3–4 May 2011
- Competitors: 59 from 59 nations

Medalists
gold medal	Hou Yuzhuo	China
silver medal	Jade Jones	Great Britain
bronze medal	Marlène Harnois	France
bronze medal	Lim Su-jeong	South Korea

The Women's featherweight is a competition featured at the 2011 World Taekwondo Championships, and was held at the Gyeongju Gymnasium in Gyeongju, South Korea on May 3 and May 4. Featherweights were limited to a maximum of 57 kilograms in body mass.

== Results ==
Legend

- DQ — Won by disqualification
- N — Not match

=== Finals ===
Semifinals		Final
Marlène Harnois (FRA)	7
Jade Jones (GBR)	8	Jade Jones (GBR)	5
Hou Yuzhuo (CHN)	5	Hou Yuzhuo (CHN)	6
Lim Su-jeong (KOR)	1

=== Top half ===
==== Section 1 ====
Round of 64
Darya Zubovich (BLR)	DQ
~~Josseline Eyenga (CMR)~~
Euda Carías (GUA)	3
Ekaterina Kuzheleva (RUS)	7
Débora Hait (ARG)	5
Fitriana Mansur (INA)	1
Andrea Rica (ESP)	3
Jessica Jordan (AUS)	1
Karen Correia (MOZ)	0
Jennifer Ågren (SWE)	19
Marlène Harnois (FRA)	14
Sanju Boro (IND)	0
Yekaterina Dmitriyeva (KAZ)	3
Rafaela Araújo (BRA)	4

Round of 32
Tseng Pei-hua (TPE)	7
Darya Zubovich (BLR)	3
Ekaterina Kuzheleva (RUS)	9
Débora Hait (ARG)	9
Andrea Rica (ESP)	2
Jennifer Ågren (SWE)	0
Marlène Harnois (FRA)	14
Rafaela Araújo (BRA)	2

Round of 16
Tseng Pei-hua (TPE)	4
Ekaterina Kuzheleva (RUS)	7
Andrea Rica (ESP)	0
Marlène Harnois (FRA)	7

Quarterfinals
Ekaterina Kuzheleva (RUS)	4
Marlène Harnois (FRA)	13

==== Section 2 ====
Round of 64
Jade Jones (GBR)	11
Iana Gagnidze (GEO)	1
Sıla Rümeysa Ölçek (TUR)	2
Despina Pilavaki (CYP)	1
Andrea Paoli (LIB)	DQ
~~Doris Patiño (COL)~~
Deborah Louz (NED)	2
Mona Solheim (NOR)	1
Wassene Russiane Buthro (CGO)	DQ
~~Karina Andrade (ECU)~~
Hend Yasser (EGY)	2
Aminata Traoré (MLI)	1

Round of 32
Veronica Calabrese (ITA)	3
Jade Jones (GBR)	7
Sıla Rümeysa Ölçek (TUR)	3
Andrea Paoli (LIB)	2
Deborah Louz (NED)	12
Wassene Russiane Buthro (CGO)	0
Hend Yasser (EGY)	3
Bineta Diédhiou (SEN)	7

Round of 16
Jade Jones (GBR)	6
Sıla Rümeysa Ölçek (TUR)	5
Deborah Louz (NED)	5
Bineta Diédhiou (SEN)	6

Quarterfinals
Jade Jones (GBR)	2^{N}
Bineta Diédhiou (SEN)	1

=== Bottom half ===
==== Section 3 ====
Round of 64
Danielle Holmquist (USA)	12
Dilobar Saydullaeva (UZB)	5
Yelissa Montes (DOM)	1
Autumn Ashcroft (CAN)	13
~~Sephora Baelenge (COD)~~
Iuliia Podolian (UKR)	DQ
~~Robin Cheong (NZL)~~
Worawong Pongpanit (THA)	DQ
Gunay Aghakishiyeva (AZE)	6
Antonela Marijan (BIH)	3
Manuela Bezzola (SUI)	3
Edina Kotsis (HUN)	10
Wu Sze Ngo (HKG)	2
Sousan Hajipour (IRI)	11

Round of 32
Hou Yuzhuo (CHN)	3
Danielle Holmquist (USA)	0
Autumn Ashcroft (CAN)	0
Iuliia Podolian (UKR)	6
Worawong Pongpanit (THA)	5
Gunay Aghakishiyeva (AZE)	7
Edina Kotsis (HUN)	3
Sousan Hajipour (IRI)	4

Round of 16
Hou Yuzhuo (CHN)	3
Iuliia Podolian (UKR)	0
Gunay Aghakishiyeva (AZE)	5
Sousan Hajipour (IRI)	7

Quarterfinals
Hou Yuzhuo (CHN)	7
Sousan Hajipour (IRI)	6

==== Section 4 ====
Round of 64
Laura Vásquez (ESA)	5
Aleksandra Uścińska (POL)	5
Irma Contreras (MEX)	3
Marah Al-Sqour (JOR)	5
Tanja Tanacković (SRB)	4
Karla Alava (PHI)	1
Lisa Weinzierl (AUT)	1
Hajiba Enhari (MAR)	13
Lim Su-jeong (KOR)	DQ
~~Bürenbaataryn Tuyaasaikhan (MGL)~~
Margarita Michailidou (GRE)	DQ
~~Pauline Zawadi (KEN)~~
~~Katherine Reyes (VEN)~~
Emily Cartagena (PUR)	DQ

Round of 32
Laura Vásquez (ESA)	4
Marah Al-Sqour (JOR)	1
Tanja Tanacković (SRB)	2
Hajiba Enhari (MAR)	6
Lim Su-jeong (KOR)	4
Margarita Michailidou (GRE)	2
Emily Cartagena (PUR)	5
Bat-El Gatterer (ISR)	6

Round of 16
Laura Vásquez (ESA)	2
Hajiba Enhari (MAR)	5
Lim Su-jeong (KOR)	6
Bat-El Gatterer (ISR)	4

Quarterfinals
Hajiba Enhari (MAR)	1
Lim Su-jeong (KOR)	7
