= Taekwondo at the 2015 European Games – Women's 57 kg =

Taekwondo competition

Women's 57 kg at the 2015 European Games
- Venue: Crystal Hall complex
- Date: 17 June
- Competitors: 16 from 16 nations

Medalists
gold medal	Jade Jones	Great Britain
silver medal	Ana Zaninović	Croatia
bronze medal	Nikita Glasnović	Sweden
bronze medal	Eva Calvo	Spain

Women's 57 kg competition at the Taekwondo at the 2015 European Games in Baku, Azerbaijan, took place on 17 June at Crystal Hall complex.

== Schedule ==
All times are Azerbaijan Summer Time (UTC+5).

Date	Time	Event
Tuesday, 17 June 2015	11:00	1/8 finals
Tuesday, 17 June 2015	13:00	Quarterfinals
Tuesday, 17 June 2015	13:00	Semifinals
Tuesday, 17 June 2015	15:00	Repechage
Tuesday, 17 June 2015	19:00	Finals

== Results ==
Legend

- R — Won by referee stop contest
- W — Won by withdrawal

1/8 finals
Eva Calvo (ESP)	13
Ada Demneri (ALB)	1
Suvi Mikkonen (FIN)	4
Hatice Kübra Yangın (TUR)	7
Ana Zaninović (CRO)	9^{R}
Ekaterina Kim (RUS)	3
Dragana Gladović (SRB)	8
Gunay Aghakishiyeva (AZE)	4
Nikita Glasnović (SWE)	1
Joana Cunha (POR)	0
Manuela Bezzola (SUI)	0
Floriane Liborio (FRA)	6
Anna-Lena Frömming (GER)	5
Edina Kotsis (HUN)	11
Despina Pilavaki (CYP)	1
Jade Jones (GBR)	9

Quarterfinals
Eva Calvo (ESP)	11
Hatice Kübra Yangın (TUR)	3
Ana Zaninović (CRO)	14
Dragana Gladović (SRB)	1
Nikita Glasnović (SWE)	6
Floriane Liborio (FRA)	5
Edina Kotsis (HUN)	2
Jade Jones (GBR)	5

Semifinals
Eva Calvo (ESP)	5
Ana Zaninović (CRO)	7
Nikita Glasnović (SWE)	6
Jade Jones (GBR)	7

Final
Ana Zaninović (CRO)	9
Jade Jones (GBR)	12

=== Repechage ===
Repechage round 1
Dragana Gladović (SRB)	W
Ekaterina Kim (RUS)
Despina Pilavaki (CYP)	0
Edina Kotsis (HUN)	2

Bronze medal match
Nikita Glasnović (SWE)	7
Dragana Gladović (SRB)	0
Edina Kotsis (HUN)	2
Eva Calvo (ESP)	15
