= Milica Mandić =

Serbian taekwondo practitioner

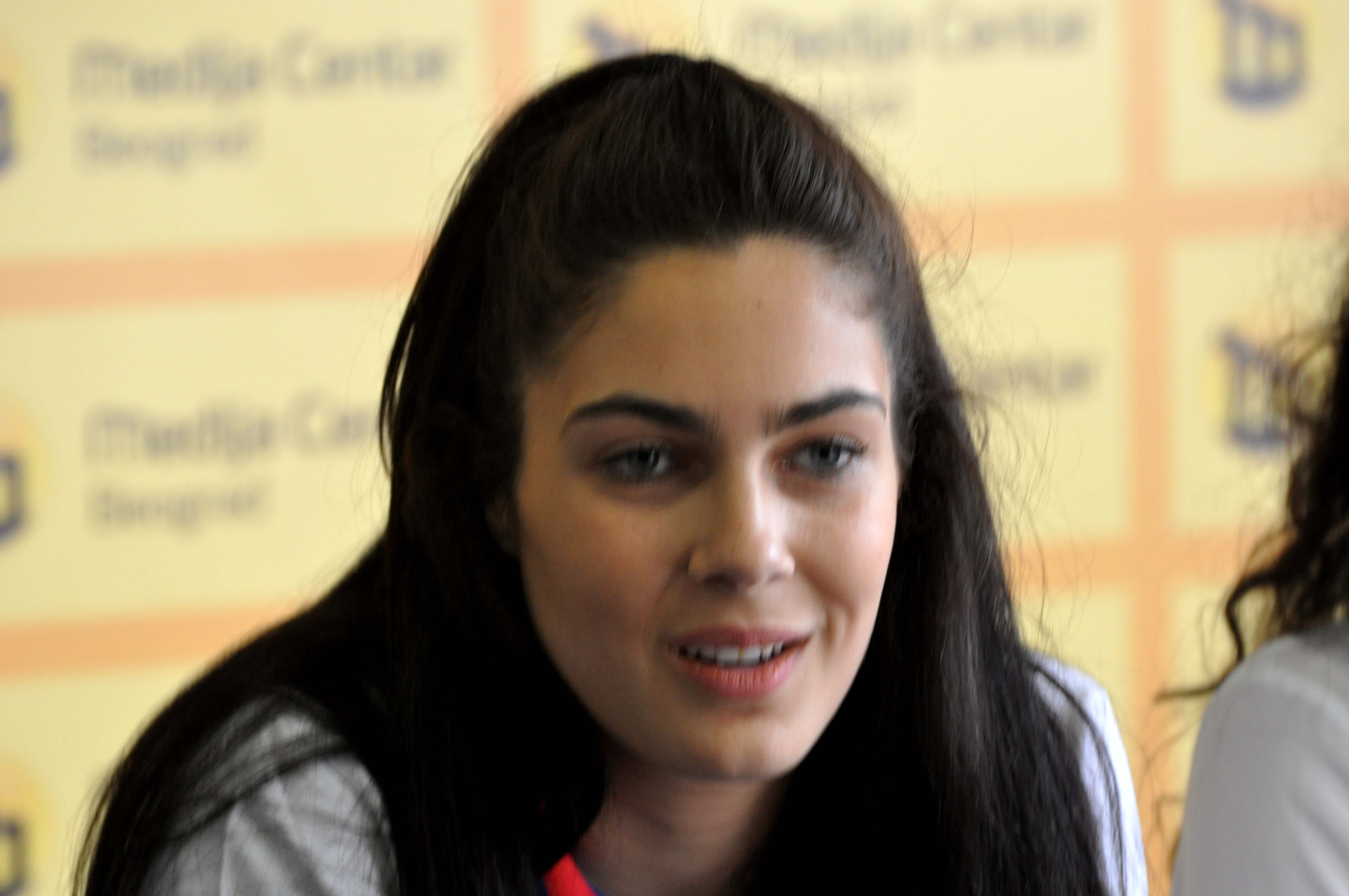
- Mandić in 2016 during press conference

Personal information
- Nationality: Serbian
- Born: 6 December 1991 (age 34) Belgrade, SR Serbia, SFR Yugoslavia
- Height: 6 ft 1 in (1.85 m)
- Weight: 175 lb (79 kg)

Sport
- Country: Serbia
- Sport: Taekwondo
- Event: Middleweight
- Club: TK Galeb
- Coached by: Dragan Jović
Medal record
Women's taekwondo
Representing Serbia
Olympic Games
Gold medal – first place	2012 London	+67 kg
Gold medal – first place	2020 Tokyo	+67 kg
World Championships
Gold medal – first place	2017 Muju	73 kg
Bronze medal – third place	2011 Gyeongju	73 kg
Grand Prix
Gold medal – first place	2014 Manchester	+67 kg
Silver medal – second place	2017 Rabat	+67 kg
Silver medal – second place	2018 Rome	+67 kg
Bronze medal – third place	2014 Suzhou	+67 kg
Bronze medal – third place	2015 Manchester	+67 kg
Bronze medal – third place	2018 Moscow	+67 kg
European Championships
Silver medal – second place	2012 Manchester	73 kg
Silver medal – second place	2014 Baku	73 kg
Silver medal – second place	2016 Montreux	73 kg
Silver medal – second place	2021 Sofia	73 kg
European Games
Silver medal – second place	2015 Baku	+67 kg
Mediterranean Games
Silver medal – second place	2013 Mersin	+67 kg
World Junior Championships
Bronze medal – third place	2008 İzmir	68 kg

Milica Mandić (Serbian Cyrillic: Милица Мандић, born 6 December 1991) is a Serbian retired taekwondo athlete. She is a two-time Olympic champion in the Women's +67 kg category, having won gold medals at the 2012 and 2020 Summer Olympics. She was also the 2017 world champion in the 73 kg category.

== Career ==
Mandić won a bronze medal in the middleweight category (under 73 kg) at the 2011 World Taekwondo Championships and a silver medal at the 2012 European Taekwondo Championships.

At the 2012 Summer Olympics Mandić beat European Championship gold medallist Anastasia Baryshnikova in the semi finals, before defeating top-seeded Anne-Caroline Graffe of France in a 9–7 win, becoming the first gold medalist for independent Serbia.

At the 2016 Summer Olympics she was eliminated in quarterfinals by British Bianca Walkden. At 2017 World Taekwondo Championships she won gold medal, beating South Korean Oh Hye-ri. In April 2020, she announced that she would retire after the 2020 Summer Olympics. At the 2020 Summer Olympics, which were held one year later due to COVID-19 pandemic, she won her second gold medal (first for Serbia in Tokyo 2020) after defeating South Korean Lee Da-bin in the final.

== Hall of Fame ==
Mandić and her trainer Dragan Jović were inducted in the Taekwondo Hall of Fame at the 2013 ceremony in Las Vegas. She was selected because of her great contribution to the sport in Serbia and across the globe.

== Retirement ==
Following the 2020 Summer Olympics, Mandić ended her professional sports career and married Mark Đuričić, who she had been in a relationship with for eight years.

Awards and achievements
Preceded by Novak Djokovic	The Best Athlete of Serbia; 2012	Succeeded by Emir Bekrić
