= 2013 World Taekwondo Grand Prix =

Taekwondo competition

The 2013 World Taekwondo Grand Prix was the 1st edition of the World Taekwondo Grand Prix and was held in Manchester, United Kingdom from 13 to 15 December 2013.

== Medal summary ==
=== Men ===
| Event | Gold | Silver | Bronze |
|---|---|---|---|
| 58 kg | Wei Chen-yang; Chinese Taipei | Kim Tae-hun; South Korea | Damián Villa; Mexico |
| 58 kg | Wei Chen-yang; Chinese Taipei | Kim Tae-hun; South Korea | Hadi Mostaan; Iran |
| 68 kg | Aleksey Denisenko; Russia | Maxime Potvin; Canada | Behnam Asbaghi; Iran |
| 68 kg | Aleksey Denisenko; Russia | Maxime Potvin; Canada | Mohammad Bagheri Motamed; Iran |
| 80 kg | Lutalo Muhammad; Great Britain | Albert Gaun; Russia | Yunus Sarı; Turkey |
| 80 kg | Lutalo Muhammad; Great Britain | Albert Gaun; Russia | Aaron Cook; Isle of Man |
| +80 kg | Mahama Cho; Great Britain | Guilherme Félix; Brazil | Anthony Obame; Gabon |
| +80 kg | Mahama Cho; Great Britain | Guilherme Félix; Brazil | Cha Dong-min; South Korea |

=== Women ===
| Event | Gold | Silver | Bronze |
|---|---|---|---|
| 49 kg | Brigitte Yagüe; Spain | Kim So-hui; South Korea | Li Zhaoyi; China |
| 49 kg | Brigitte Yagüe; Spain | Kim So-hui; South Korea | Yasmina Aziez; France |
| 57 kg | Eva Calvo; Spain | Jade Jones; Great Britain | Floriane Liborio; France |
| 57 kg | Eva Calvo; Spain | Jade Jones; Great Britain | Hou Yuzhuo; China |
| 67 kg | Elin Johansson; Sweden | Chuang Chia-chia; Chinese Taipei | Haby Niaré; France |
| 67 kg | Elin Johansson; Sweden | Chuang Chia-chia; Chinese Taipei | Anastasia Baryshnikova; Russia |
| +67 kg | Olga Ivanova; Russia | Lee In-jong; South Korea | Briseida Acosta; Mexico |
| +67 kg | Olga Ivanova; Russia | Lee In-jong; South Korea | Reshmie Oogink; Netherlands |

== Medal table ==
| Rank | Nation | Gold | Silver | Bronze | Total |
|---|---|---|---|---|---|
| 1 | Russia (RUS) | 2 | 1 | 1 | 4 |
| 2 | Great Britain (GBR) | 2 | 1 | 0 | 3 |
| 3 | Spain (ESP) | 2 | 0 | 0 | 2 |
| 4 | Chinese Taipei (TPE) | 1 | 1 | 0 | 2 |
| 5 | Sweden (SWE) | 1 | 0 | 0 | 1 |
| 6 | South Korea (KOR) | 0 | 3 | 1 | 4 |
| 7 | Brazil (BRA) | 0 | 1 | 0 | 1 |
| 7 | Canada (CAN) | 0 | 1 | 0 | 1 |
| 9 | France (FRA) | 0 | 0 | 3 | 3 |
| 9 | Iran (IRI) | 0 | 0 | 3 | 3 |
| 11 | China (CHN) | 0 | 0 | 2 | 2 |
| 11 | Mexico (MEX) | 0 | 0 | 2 | 2 |
| 13 | Gabon (GAB) | 0 | 0 | 1 | 1 |
| 13 | Isle of Man (IMN) | 0 | 0 | 1 | 1 |
| 13 | Netherlands (NED) | 0 | 0 | 1 | 1 |
| 13 | Turkey (TUR) | 0 | 0 | 1 | 1 |
| Totals (16 entries) | | 8 | 8 | 16 | 32 |
