= Taekwondo at the 2016 Summer Olympics – Women's 57 kg =

Taekwondo competition

Women's 57kg at the Games of the XXXI Olympiad
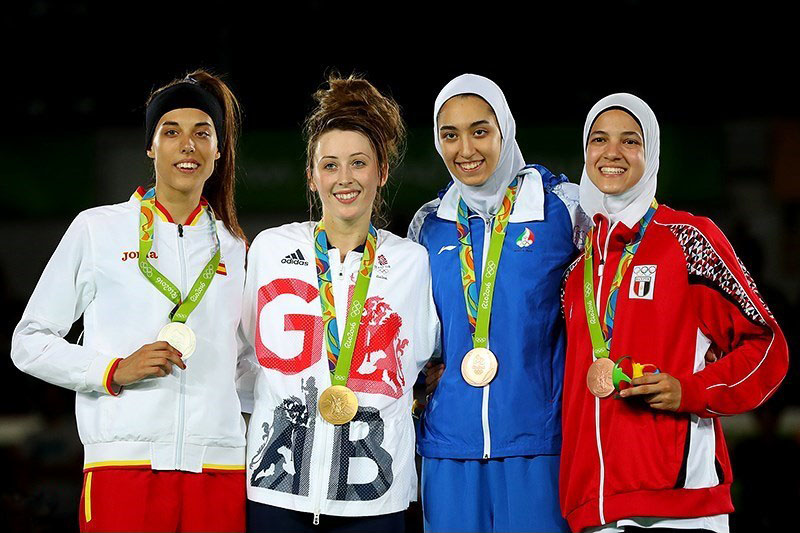
- Venue: Carioca Arena 3
- Date: 18 August 2016
- Competitors: 16 from 16 nations

Medalists
1st place, gold medalist(s)		Jade Jones	Great Britain
2nd place, silver medalist(s)		Eva Calvo	Spain
3rd place, bronze medalist(s)		Hedaya Malak	Egypt
3rd place, bronze medalist(s)		Kimia Alizadeh	Iran

The women's 57 kg competition at the 2016 Summer Olympics was held on 18 August, at the Carioca Arena 3. The defending champion, Jade Jones, representing Great Britain, successfully defended her title, winning her second Olympics gold. Eva Calvo from Spain finished with a silver medal, beating second-time Olympian Hedaya Malak in the semifinal and Iran's Kimia Alizadeh in the quarterfinal, both of whom went on to win a bronze in the repechage.

== Competition format ==
The main bracket consisted of a single elimination tournament, culminating in the gold medal match. The top eight athletes in each event were seeded so as not to face each other in the preliminary round. The remainder of the qualified athletes were drawn randomly on 15 August 2016. Two bronze medals were awarded at the Taekwondo competitions. A repechage was used to determine the bronze medal winners. Every competitor who lost to one of the two finalists competed in the repechage, another single-elimination competition. Each semifinal loser faced the last remaining repechage competitor from the opposite half of the bracket in a bronze medal match.

== Schedule ==
All times are in local time (UTC-3).

Date	Time	Round
Thursday, 18 August 2016	09:00; 15:00; 17:00; 20:00; 21:00; 22:00	Preliminary round Quarterfinals; Semifinals; Repechage; Bronze medal matches Final

== Seeds ==
Every practitioner was seeded at the event. Practitioners representing the hosting nation were seeded as no. 4 regardless of their current world ranking.

1. Jade Jones (GBR)
2. Eva Calvo (ESP)
3. Hedaya Malak (EGY)
4. Júlia Vasconcelos (BRA)
5. Nikita Glasnović (SWE)
6. Mayu Hamada (JPN)
7. Ana Zaninović (CRO)
8. Carolena Carstens (PAN)
9. Raheleh Asemani (BEL)
10. Kimia Alizadeh (IRI)
11. Rahma Ben Ali (TUN)
12. Caroline Marton (AUS)
13. Suvi Mikkonen (FIN)
14. Doris Patiño (COL)
15. Phannapa Harnsujin (THA)
16. Naima Bakkal (MAR)

== Results ==
Legend

- PTG – Won by points gap
- SUD – Won by sudden death (golden point)

=== Main bracket ===
Preliminary round
13	Suvi Mikkonen (FIN)	10
4	Júlia Vasconcelos (BRA)	9
5	Nikita Glasnović (SWE)	4
12	Caroline Marton (AUS)	0
9	Raheleh Asemani (BEL)	13 (PTG)
8	Carolena Carstens (PAN)	1
1	Jade Jones (GBR)	12
16	Naima Bakkal (MAR)	4
15	Phannapa Harnsujin (THA)	5
2	Eva Calvo (ESP)	6
7	Ana Zaninović (CRO)	6
10	Kimia Alizadeh (IRI)	7
11	Rahma Ben Ali (TUN)	0
6	Mayu Hamada (JPN)	9
3	Hedaya Malak (EGY)	13 (PTG)
14	Doris Patiño (COL)	0

Quarterfinals
13	Suvi Mikkonen (FIN)	4
5	Nikita Glasnović (SWE)	7
9	Raheleh Asemani (BEL)	2
1	Jade Jones (GBR)	7
2	Eva Calvo (ESP)	8
10	Kimia Alizadeh (IRI)	7
6	Mayu Hamada (JPN)	0
3	Hedaya Malak (EGY)	3 (SUD)

Semifinals
5	Nikita Glasnović (SWE)	4
1	Jade Jones (GBR)	9
2	Eva Calvo (ESP)	1 (SUD)
3	Hedaya Malak (EGY)	0

Gold medal match
1	Jade Jones (GBR)	16
2	Eva Calvo (ESP)	7

=== Repechage ===
Repechage
Phannapa Harnsujin (THA)	10
Kimia Alizadeh (IRI)	14
Naima Bakkal (MAR)	0
Raheleh Asemani (BEL)	12 (PTG)

Bronze medal matches
Nikita Glasnović (SWE)	1
Kimia Alizadeh (IRI)	5
Hedaya Malak (EGY)	1 (SUD)
Raheleh Asemani (BEL)	0
