= Mahama Cho =

Taekwondo practitioner (born 1989)

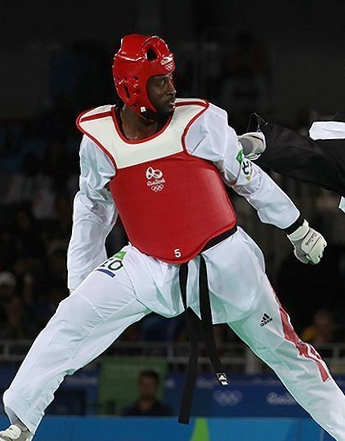
- Cho at the 2016 Olympics

Personal information
- Born: 16 August 1989 (age 36) Ivory Coast
- Height: 192 cm (6 ft 4 in)
- Weight: 100 kg (220 lb)

Sport
- Sport: Taekwondo
- Coached by: Paul Green
Medal record
Representing Great Britain
Men's taekwondo
World Championships
Silver medal – second place	2017 Muju	+87 kg
Grand Prix
Gold medal – first place	2013 Manchester	+80 kg
Gold medal – first place	2017 Rabat	+80 kg
Silver medal – second place	2014 Astana	+80 kg
Bronze medal – third place	2014 Suzhou	+80 kg
Bronze medal – third place	2015 Moscow	+80 kg
Bronze medal – third place	2017 London	+80 kg
Bronze medal – third place	2018 Taoyuan	+80 kg
Bronze medal – third place	2019 Rome	+80 kg
- Updated on 19 September 2019

Mahama Cho (born 16 August 1989) is a taekwondo practitioner who competes in the +87 kg category. Born in the Ivory Coast, he has represented both Great Britain and France in the sport.

== Early life and personal life ==
Abdoufata Cho Mahama was raised by his grandmother in the Ivory Coast; his father was abroad and his mother was unable to care for him. A practising Muslim, he attended an Arabic school in Abidjan. As a child, Cho was bullied.

Cho moved to London at the age of eight at the request of his father. Cho's father Zakaia was a former African taekwondo champion who was teaching the sport there whilst also driving taxis. When he arrived in England, staying first in Kennington and then in Stockwell, Cho was unable to speak any English. He lived with his father's new family, forming a particularly close friendship with his step-brother David.

In 2014, he became engaged to French heptathlete Antoinette Nana Djimou. but their relationship ended in 2017.

He married Konnie Touré, an Ivorian radio and TV presenter, producer, actress, singer, screenwriter and business manager in 2023, in Abidjan.

== Football career ==
Cho played semi-professionally for Erith Town. He trialled with Dagenham and Redbridge at the age of 16. He gave up his football career at the age of 17 to focus on taekwondo.

== Taekwondo career ==
He joined the British taekwondo squad at the age of 17. He was injured at the 2011 World Championships. After that event, he moved to Paris to study. He joined the French taekwondo squad, winning gold at 2013 Dutch and USA Opens.

After returning to compete for Britain, at the World Taekwondo Grand Prix he won a gold medal in 2013, and a silver medal in 2014. In January 2016 he secured Britain their fourth and final qualifying place for the 2016 Summer Olympics.

== Results ==
2017

- (silver) World Taekwondo Championships in Muju, South Korea
- (gold) Moldova International Open, in Chișinău, Moldova

2016

5th 2016 Summer Olympics in Rio de Janeiro, Brazil

2015

- (gold) President's Cup, in Hamburg, Germany
- (gold) European Olympic Qualification Tournament, in Istanbul, Turkey
- (silver) Polish International Open, in Warsaw, Poland
- (silver) US Open, in Las Vegas, United States
- (bronze) Serbia International Open, in Belgrad, Serbia
- (bronze) Grand Prix, in Moscow, Russia

2014

- (gold) Paris International Open, in Paris, France
- (gold) Commonwealth Championships in Edinburgh, Scotland
- (gold) Swiss International Open
- (gold) Bahrain International Open, Bahrain
- (silver) Grand Prix Series in Astana, Kazakhstan
- (silver) Luxor International Open, in Luxor, Egypt
- (bronze) Fujairah International Open, in Fujairah, United Arab Emirates
- (bronze) Grand Prix, in Suzhou, China

2013

- (gold) Grand Prix Final in Manchester, England
- (gold) German International Open, in Hamburg, Germany
- (gold) Dutch International Open, in Eindhoven, Nederlands
- (silver) Paris International Open, in Paris, France
- (bronze) Spanish International Open, in Alicante, Spain
- (bronze) US Open, in Las Vegas, United States

2012

- (gold) Israel International Open, in Tel Aviv, Israel
- (bronze) Spanish International Open, in Alicante, Spain
- (bronze) Dutch International Open, in Eindhoven, Nederlands
