= 2011 World Taekwondo Championships – Women's middleweight =

Taekwondo competition

Women's middleweight at the 2011 World Championships
- Venue: Gyeongju Indoor Stadium
- Dates: 5–6 May 2011
- Competitors: 35 from 35 nations

Medalists
gold medal	Gwladys Épangue	France
silver medal	Oh Hye-ri	South Korea
bronze medal	Milica Mandić	Serbia
bronze medal	Anastasia Baryshnikova	Russia

The Women's middleweight is a competition featured at the 2011 World Taekwondo Championships, and was held at the Gyeongju Gymnasium in Gyeongju, South Korea on May 5 and May 6. Middleweights were limited to a maximum of 73 kilograms in body mass.

== Results ==
Legend

- DQ — Won by disqualification
- W — Won by withdrawal

=== Finals ===
Semifinals		Final
Oh Hye-ri (KOR)	7
Milica Mandić (SRB)	4	Oh Hye-ri (KOR)	2
Anastasia Baryshnikova (RUS)	0	Gwladys Épangue (FRA)	2
Gwladys Épangue (FRA)	5

=== Top half ===
==== Section 1 ====
Round of 64
Fei Lulu (CHN)	4
Deysy Montes de Oca (DOM)	5

Round of 32
María Espinoza (MEX)	4
Deysy Montes de Oca (DOM)	1
Hà Thị Nguyên (VIE)	10
Jasmine Vokey (CAN)	6
Oh Hye-ri (KOR)	6
Charikleia Livera (CYP)	0
~~Chrystelle Naami Yang (CMR)~~
Melda Akcan (GER)	DQ

Round of 16
María Espinoza (MEX)	5
Hà Thị Nguyên (VIE)	4
Oh Hye-ri (KOR)	7
Melda Akcan (GER)	0

Quarterfinals
María Espinoza (MEX)	4
Oh Hye-ri (KOR)	8

==== Section 2 ====
Round of 64

Round of 32
Rapatkorn Prasopsuk (THA)	4
Nuša Rajher (SLO)	5
Iwona Kosiorek (POL)	5
Yelena Abbasova (AZE)	4
~~Maria Yaciofano (VEN)~~
Milica Mandić (SRB)	DQ
Dalia Avivi (USA)	2
Feruza Yergeshova (KAZ)	4

Round of 16
Nuša Rajher (SLO)	6
Iwona Kosiorek (POL)	7
Milica Mandić (SRB)	2
Feruza Yergeshova (KAZ)	0

Quarterfinals
Iwona Kosiorek (POL)	1
Milica Mandić (SRB)	9

=== Bottom half ===
==== Section 3 ====
Round of 64
Marina Dimitropoulou (GRE)	9
Elena Gómez (ESP)	7

Round of 32
Anastasia Baryshnikova (RUS)	10
Marina Dimitropoulou (GRE)	1
Kiara Peña (PUR)	W
Eka Sahara (INA)
Deolinda Chachine (MOZ)	DQ
~~Gladys Mwaniki (KEN)~~
Chuang Chia-chia (TPE)	3
Reshmie Oogink (NED)	4

Round of 16
Anastasia Baryshnikova (RUS)	18
Kiara Peña (PUR)	1
Deolinda Chachine (MOZ)	1
Reshmie Oogink (NED)	16

Quarterfinals
Anastasia Baryshnikova (RUS)	12
Reshmie Oogink (NED)	1

==== Section 4 ====
Round of 64
Jasmine Cross (AUS)	2
Aminata Doumbia (MLI)	3

Round of 32
Furkan Asena Aydın (TUR)	DQ
~~Sandra Vanegas (COL)~~
Natalia Forcada (ARG)	3
Jacqueline Quek (SIN)	2
Sorn Davin (CAM)	1
Raphaella Pereira (BRA)	7
Aminata Doumbia (MLI)	0
Gwladys Épangue (FRA)	5

Round of 16
Furkan Asena Aydın (TUR)	8
Natalia Forcada (ARG)	3
Raphaella Pereira (BRA)	4
Gwladys Épangue (FRA)	5

Quarterfinals
Furkan Asena Aydın (TUR)	1
Gwladys Épangue (FRA)	3
