= Hedaya Malak =

Egyptian taekwondo practitioner

Hedaya Malak Wahba
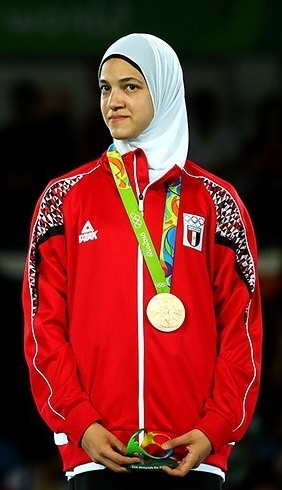
- Malak at the 2016 Summer Olympics

Personal information
- Nationality: Egyptian
- Born: هداية ملاك وهبة; 21 April 1993 (age 33) Cairo, Egypt
- Height: 1.74 m (5 ft 9 in)
- Weight: 67 kg (148 lb)

Sport
- Country: Egypt
- Sport: Taekwondo
- Event: –67 kg
- Coached by: Rossindo Alonso
Medal record
Representing Egypt
Olympic Games
Bronze medal – third place	2016 Rio de Janeiro	–57 kg
Bronze medal – third place	2020 Tokyo	–67 kg
African Games
Gold medal – first place	2011 Maputo	-57 kg
Silver medal – second place	2015 Brazzaville	-57 kg
Mediterranean Games
Bronze medal – third place	2013 Mersin	-67 kg
Bronze medal – third place	2018 Tarragona	-67 kg
Grand Prix
Bronze medal – third place	2015 Moscow	-57 kg
Gold medal – first place	2015 Mexico City	-57 kg
Silver medal – second place	2016 Baku	-57 kg
Bronze medal – third place	2019 Rome	-67 kg
African Championships
Gold medal – first place	2016 Port Said	-57 kg
Silver medal – second place	2014 Tunis	-57 kg
Military World Games
Gold medal – first place	2015 Mungyeong	-62 kg

Hedaya Malak Wahba (Egyptian Arabic: هدايه ملاك وهبة, born 21 April 1993) is an Egyptian taekwondo practitioner. She participated in the Olympic Games in London in 2012, won a bronze medal in Rio 2016, and another bronze medal in Tokyo 2020.

== Career ==
Malak took up taekwondo aged six, following her elder brother; she was joined by her younger brother. She ranked first in the Giza governorate championship before winning Egypt's championship at 14 years old.

At the London 2012 Olympics, she competed in the Taekwondo women's 57 kg and qualified for the quarterfinals by defeating Robin Cheong of New Zealand in the round of 16. She was defeated at the quarterfinals by Marlène Harnois of France.

She qualified for the 2016 Summer Olympics in Rio de Janeiro, ranking third in the WTF Olympic Rankings as of December 2015. Malak passed through the early rounds, defeating Doris Patiño and Mayu Hamada before losing out in the semifinals to Eva Calvo of Spain. Malak then won the bronze medal after defeating Raheleh Asemani of Belgium in the Repechage.

She represented Egypt at the 2020 Summer Olympics in the –67 kg category. She lost in the quarter final to Lauren Williams of Great Britain. Hedaya then won the bronze medal after defeating Malia Paseka of Tonga followed by Paige McPherson of the United States in the Repechage

== See also ==
- Muslim women in sport

Olympic Games
Preceded by Ahmed El-Ahmar	Flag bearer for Egypt; 2020 Tokyo with Alaaeldin Abouelkassem	Succeeded by Incumbent
