= Lutalo Muhammad =

British taekwondo athlete (born 1991)

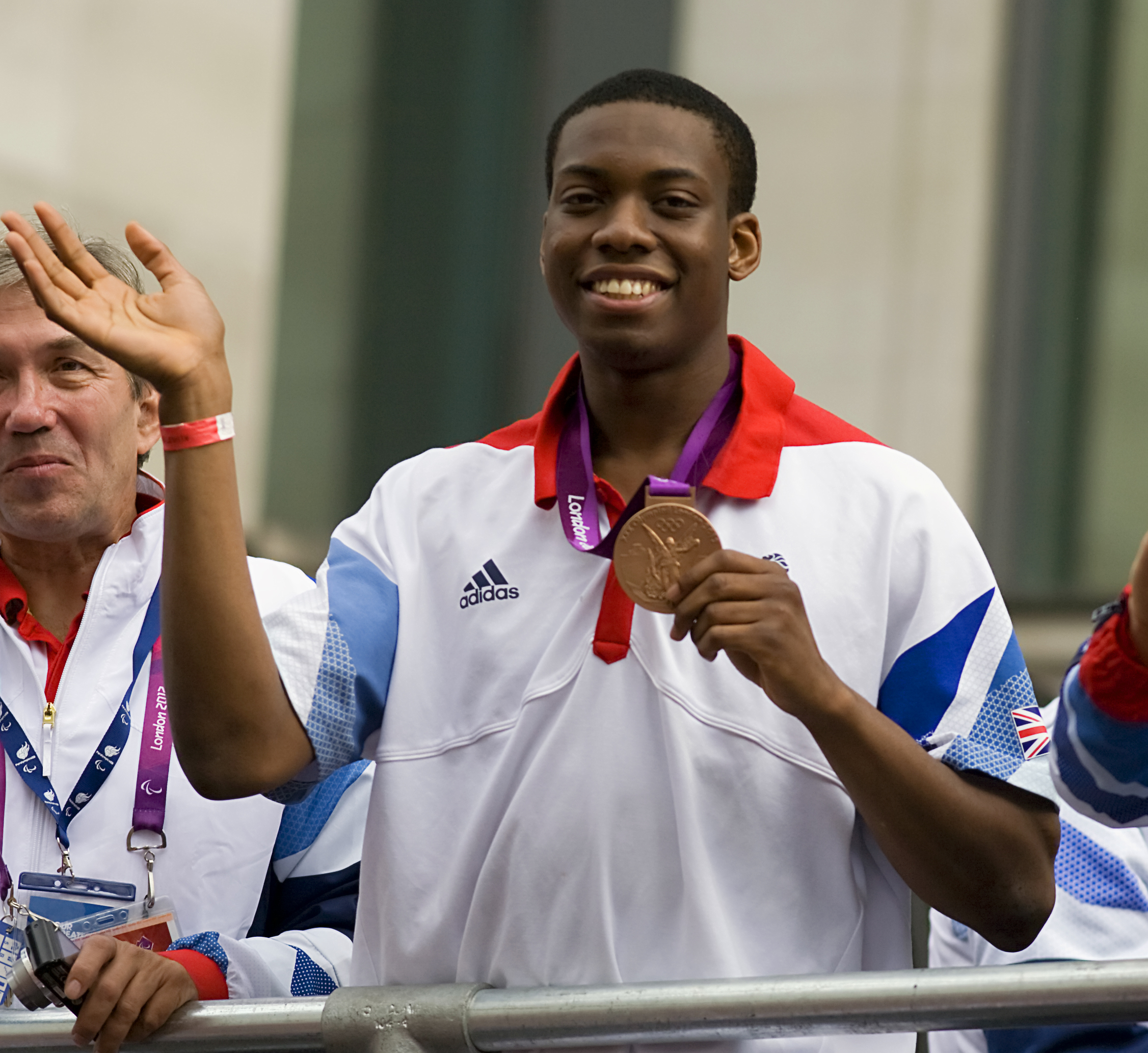

Personal information
- Nationality: British
- Born: 3 June 1991 (age 35) Walthamstow, London
- Education: Middlesex University
- Years active: 2008–2022
- Height: 1.90 m (6 ft 3 in)
- Weight: 80 kg (176 lb)
- Website: gbtaekwondo.co.uk

Sport
- Country: Britain
- Sport: Taekwondo
- Event(s): -80kg -87kg
- Club: Wayne Muhammad Taekwondo Academy
- Coached by: Wayne Muhammad

Achievements and titles
- Highest world ranking: 1 (−80kg); 4 (−87kg)
Medal record
Representing Great Britain
Men's taekwondo
Olympic Games
Silver medal – second place	2016 Rio de Janeiro	80 kg
Bronze medal – third place	2012 London	80 kg
European Games
Bronze medal – third place	2015 Baku	80 kg
European Championships
Gold medal – first place	2012 Manchester	Middleweight
Bronze medal – third place	2014 Baku	Middleweight
Grand Prix
Gold medal – first place	2013 Manchester	Middleweight
Silver medal – second place	2015 Manchester	Middleweight
Gold medal – first place	2015 Mexico City	Middleweight
- Updated on 26 March 2017

Lutalo Muhammad (born 3 June 1991) is a British retired taekwondo athlete who represented Great Britain at the 2012 Summer Olympics, winning a bronze medal, and the 2016 Summer Olympics, winning a silver medal. He won the gold medal in the −87 kg class at the 2012 European Taekwondo Championships.

== Early life ==
Muhammad was born on 3 June 1991 in Walthamstow, London, England. He was coached by his father, Wayne Muhammad, in the art of taekwondo from the age of three.

His grandparents were immigrants to the UK. He is of Jamaican and Nigerian descent.

== 2012 Summer Olympics ==
Muhammad won the gold medal in the −87 kg class at the 2012 European Taekwondo Championships.

There is no −87 kg category in the Olympic Games; however, Muhammad was selected to be Britain's representative in the −80 kg category at the 2012 Summer Olympics. This decision was controversial as he was selected instead of Aaron Cook, who was the World No. 1 and European champion in the −80 kg class. The controversy attracted considerable attention in the media.

The decision drew criticism from former athletes such as John Cullen and Steve Redgrave. Muhammed received hate mail following his selection. GB performance director Gary Hall defended his selection and said "Aaron has a bigger marketing machine than the whole of GB Taekwondo", whilst fellow taekwondo competitor Sarah Stevenson dismissed the world rankings as inconsequential.

Muhammad stated that "Unfortunately with the nature of sport there are always going to be winners and losers so I wish him all the best for his future, but my focus right now is not Aaron Cook, it's a gold medal in London." In the Games, Muhammad reached the quarter-finals where he lost to Nicolás García of Spain. In the repechage, he defeated Armenian Arman Yeremyan 9–3 winning a bronze medal.

== 2016 Summer Olympics ==
Muhammad won the Olympic silver medal −80 kg category improving on his bronze from 2012. Muhammad was leading 6–4 in the final before losing in the last second to Cheick Sallah Cisse of Ivory Coast. Down by two points and only one second remaining, Cisse released a spinning hook kick that landed on Muhammad's head, scoring 4 points and winning the bout.

== 2020 Summer Olympics ==
Muhammad was not selected for the 2020 Olympics, instead working in media as a pundit for the BBC.

== Retirement ==
Muhammad announced his retirement in September 2022.

== Honours ==
- 2008 German Open (Gold) Jnr
- GLL Sports Foundation Award (2008)
- Middlesex University Sportsman of the Year (2011)
- 2012 London Olympics (Bronze)
- 2012 European Championships (Gold)
- Middlesex University Sportsman of the Year (2012)
- 2013 National Championships (Gold)
- 2013 World Grand Prix Final (Gold)
- 2014 European Championships (Bronze)
- 2014 National Championships (Gold)
- 2014 Commonwealth Championships (Gold)
- 2015 European Club Championships (Gold)
- 2015 European Olympic Games (Bronze)
- 2015 World Grand Prix Final (Gold)
- 2016 Rio de Janeiro Olympics (Silver)
