= Elin Johansson (taekwondo) =

Swedish taekwondo practitioner (born 1990)

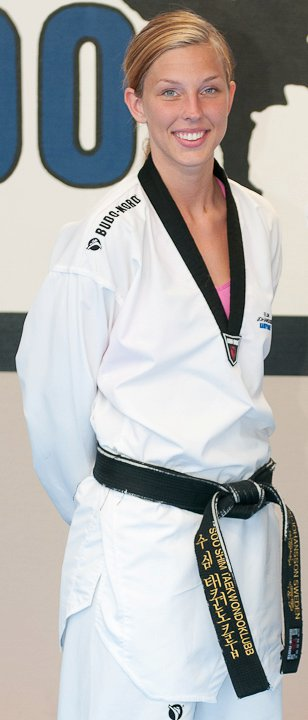

Personal information
- Nationality: Swedish
- Born: 5 August 1990 (age 36) Skellefteå, Sweden
- Height: 1.75 m (5 ft 9 in)
- Weight: 66 kg (146 lb)

Sport
- Country: Sweden
- Sport: Taekwondo
- Event: Welterweight (−67 kg)
- Club: Soo Shim Taekwondo Klubb
- Coached by: Niklas Andersson
Medal record
Women's taekwondo
Representing Sweden
World Grand Prix
Gold medal – first place	2013 Manchester	−67 kg
Gold medal – first place	2014 Querétaro	−67 kg
Bronze medal – third place	2016 Baku	−67 kg
European Games
Bronze medal – third place	2015 Baku	−67 kg
European Championships
Bronze medal – third place	2008 Rome	−59 kg
Bronze medal – third place	2012 Manchester	−67 kg

Elin Maria Katarina Johansson (born 5 August 1990) is a Swedish taekwondo athlete. She qualified for the 2012 Summer Olympics but lost against the Australian athlete Carmen Marton in the quarterfinal.

In June 2015 she won a bronze medal during the European Games in Baku.

She competed at the 2016 Summer Olympics, but lost her first match against Nigora Tursunkulova.
