= Kim Tae-hun =

South Korean taekwondo practitioner

Personal information
- Born: August 15, 1994 (age 31) Wonju, Gangwon-do
- Height: 182 cm (6 ft 0 in)
- Weight: 54 kg (119 lb)
Medal record
Representing South Korea
Men's taekwondo
Olympic Games
Bronze medal – third place	2016 Rio De Janeiro	58 kg
World Championships
Gold medal – first place	2013 Puebla	Finweight
Gold medal – first place	2015 Chelyabinsk	Finweight
Gold medal – first place	2017 Muju	Finweight
Grand Prix
Silver medal – second place	2013 Manchester	58 kg
Gold medal – first place	2014 Suzhou	58 kg
Bronze medal – third place	2014 Querétaro	58 kg
Bronze medal – third place	2015 Moscow	58 kg
Bronze medal – third place	2015 Manchester	58 kg
Gold medal – first place	2015 Mexico City	58 kg
Silver medal – second place	2016 Baku	58 kg
Gold medal – first place	2017 Moscow	58 kg
Bronze medal – third place	2018 Rome	58 kg
Gold medal – first place	2018 Taoyuan	58 kg
Silver medal – second place	2018 Manchester	58 kg
Bronze medal – third place	2019 Rome	58 kg
Silver medal – second place	2019 Sofia	58 kg
Asian Games
Gold medal – first place	2014 Incheon	Finweight
Gold medal – first place	2018 Jakarta-Palembang	58 kg
Asian Championships
Gold medal – first place	2014 Tashkent	Finweight

Kim Tae-hun (Korean pronunciation: [kim.tʰɛ̝.ɦun]; born August 15, 1994) is a South Korean taekwondo practitioner.

== Sports career ==
During the 2013 World Taekwondo Championships Kim won gold in finweight, defeating Chia Lin-hsu. at the 2015 World Taekwondo Championships Kim defended his title, defeating Stanislav Denisov. He won his third consecutive gold in the same weight category at the 2017 World Taekwondo Championships in Muju beating the Iranian Armin Hadipour in the final.

He won the gold medal in the finweight division (under 54 kg) at the 2014 Asian Games in Incheon, South Korea.

In the 2016 Rio Olympics, he lost to eventual runner-up Tawin Hanprab of Thailand in their high scoring Preliminary Round match but was able to win the bronze medal through the repechage rounds.
