= Oh Hye-ri =

South Korean taekwondo athlete (born 1988)

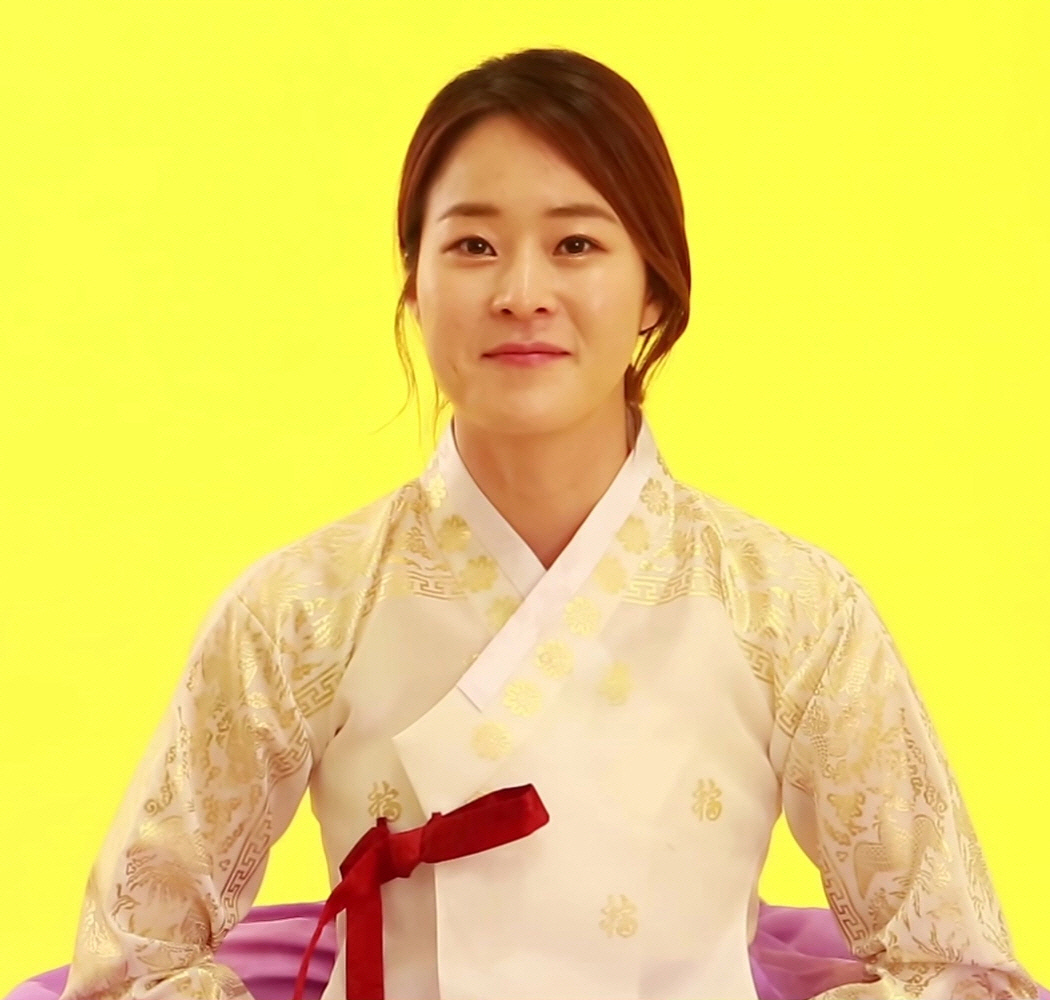

Personal information
- Nationality: South Korean
- Born: 30 April 1988 (age 38)
- Height: 182 cm (6 ft 0 in)
- Weight: 69 kg (152 lb)

Sport
- Sport: Taekwondo
Medal record
Women's taekwondo
Representing South Korea
Olympic Games
Gold medal – first place	2016 Rio De Janeiro	67 kg
World Championships
Gold medal – first place	2015 Chelyabinsk	73 kg
Silver medal – second place	2011 Gyeongju	73 kg
Silver medal – second place	2017 Muju	73 kg
Grand Slam
Bronze medal – third place	2017 Wuxi	67 kg
Grand Prix
Gold medal – first place	2015 Moscow	67 kg
Gold medal – first place	2016 Baku	67 kg
Silver medal – second place	2017 Rabat	67 kg
Silver medal – second place	2017 Abidjan	67 kg
Bronze medal – third place	2015 Manchester	67 kg
Bronze medal – third place	2017 Moscow	67 kg
Bronze medal – third place	2018 Rome	67 kg
Bronze medal – third place	2018 Moscow	67 kg
Bronze medal – third place	2018 Taoyuan	67 kg
Asian Championships
Gold medal – first place	2010 Astana	+73 kg
Gold medal – first place	2018 Ho Chi Minh City	73 kg
Universiade
Silver medal – second place	2009 Belgrad	72 kg
- Updated on 19 September 2018

Oh Hye-ri (Korean: 오혜리; Korean pronunciation: [o.ɦje̞.ɾi]; born 30 April 1988) is a South Korean taekwondo athlete.

== Career ==
In 2011, she won silver at the World Championships, then in 2015, she became the world champion in middleweight.

She represented South Korea at the 2016 Summer Olympics in Rio de Janeiro, in the women's 67 kg where she won her first Olympic gold medal.

She became the third Korean to win an Olympic gold medal in the 67 kg division (Lee Sun-Hee in 2000 and Hwang Kyung-Seon in 2008 and 2012).

She returned at the 2024 Summer Olympics in Paris as the head coach for Korean men's competitor Seo Geon-woo at the Men's 80 kg division.
