= 2016 World Taekwondo Grand Prix =

Taekwondo competition

The 2016 World Taekwondo Grand Prix was the 4th edition of the World Taekwondo Grand Prix. As 2016 was an Olympic year, unlike in 2015, the series consisted of a single Grand Prix Final event, and was held in Baku, Azerbaijan from 9 to 10 December 2016. Contests were held over the eight Olympic weight categories, rather than the full sixteen categories employed at World Championships level

== Medal summary ==
=== Men ===
Event	Gold	Silver	Bronze
58 kg	Carlos Navarro; Mexico	Kim Tae-hun; South Korea	Jesús Tortosa; Spain
68 kg	Lee Dae-hoon; South Korea	Jaouad Achab; Belgium	Konstantin Minin; Russia
80 kg	Milad Beigi; Azerbaijan	Seif Eissa; Egypt	Albert Gaun; Russia
+80 kg	Sajjad Mardani; Iran	Vladislav Larin; Russia	Roman Kuznetsov; Russia

=== Women ===
Event	Gold	Silver	Bronze
49 kg	Charlie Maddock; Great Britain	Kim So-hui; South Korea	Svetlana Igumenova; Russia
57 kg	Jade Jones; Great Britain	Hedaya Malak; Egypt	Lee Ah-reum; South Korea
67 kg	Oh Hye-ri; South Korea	Chuang Chia-chia; Chinese Taipei	Elin Johansson; Sweden
+67 kg	Bianca Walkden; Great Britain	Zheng Shuyin; China	Jackie Galloway; United States

== Medal table ==
Rank	Nation	Gold	Silver	Bronze	Total
1	Great Britain (GBR)	3	0	0	3
2	South Korea (KOR)	2	2	1	5
3	Azerbaijan (AZE)	1	0	0	1
3	Iran (IRI)	1	0	0	1
3	Mexico (MEX)	1	0	0	1
6	Egypt (EGY)	0	2	0	2
7	Russia (RUS)	0	1	4	5
8	Belgium (BEL)	0	1	0	1
8	China (CHN)	0	1	0	1
8	Chinese Taipei (TPE)	0	1	0	1
11	Spain (ESP)	0	0	1	1
11	Sweden (SWE)	0	0	1	1
11	United States (USA)	0	0	1	1
Totals (13 entries)		8	8	8	24
