= 2014 European Taekwondo Championships =

Taekwondo competition

- Venue: Sarhadchi Olympic Sports Complex
- Location: Baku, Azerbaijan
- Start date: 1 May 2014
- End date: 4 May 2014
- Competitors: 363

The 2014 European Taekwondo Championships was the 21st edition of the European Taekwondo Championships, and was held in Baku, Azerbaijan from May 1 to May 4, 2014.

== Medal table ==
* Host nation (Azerbaijan)

| Rank | Nation | Gold | Silver | Bronze | Total |
|---|---|---|---|---|---|
| 1 | Croatia (CRO) | 3 | 2 | 1 | 6 |
| 2 | Russia (RUS) | 2 | 3 | 2 | 7 |
| 3 | France (FRA) | 1 | 4 | 4 | 9 |
| 4 | Great Britain (GBR) | 1 | 2 | 4 | 7 |
| 5 | Azerbaijan (AZE)* | 1 | 0 | 4 | 5 |
| 5 | Turkey (TUR) | 1 | 0 | 4 | 5 |
| 7 | Spain (ESP) | 1 | 0 | 2 | 3 |
| 8 | Moldova (MDA) | 1 | 0 | 1 | 2 |
| 8 | Portugal (POR) | 1 | 0 | 1 | 2 |
| 10 | Belarus (BLR) | 1 | 0 | 0 | 1 |
| 10 | Belgium (BEL) | 1 | 0 | 0 | 1 |
| 10 | Isle of Man (IOM) | 1 | 0 | 0 | 1 |
| 10 | Switzerland (SUI) | 1 | 0 | 0 | 1 |
| 14 | Germany (GER) | 0 | 1 | 2 | 3 |
| 15 | Serbia (SRB) | 0 | 1 | 1 | 2 |
| 16 | Greece (GRE) | 0 | 1 | 0 | 1 |
| 16 | Slovenia (SLO) | 0 | 1 | 0 | 1 |
| 16 | Ukraine (UKR) | 0 | 1 | 0 | 1 |
| 19 | Cyprus (CYP) | 0 | 0 | 1 | 1 |
| 19 | Finland (FIN) | 0 | 0 | 1 | 1 |
| 19 | Hungary (HUN) | 0 | 0 | 1 | 1 |
| 19 | Italy (ITA) | 0 | 0 | 1 | 1 |
| 19 | Poland (POL) | 0 | 0 | 1 | 1 |
| 19 | Sweden (SWE) | 0 | 0 | 1 | 1 |
| Totals (24 entries) | | 16 | 16 | 32 | 64 |

== Medal summary ==
=== Men ===
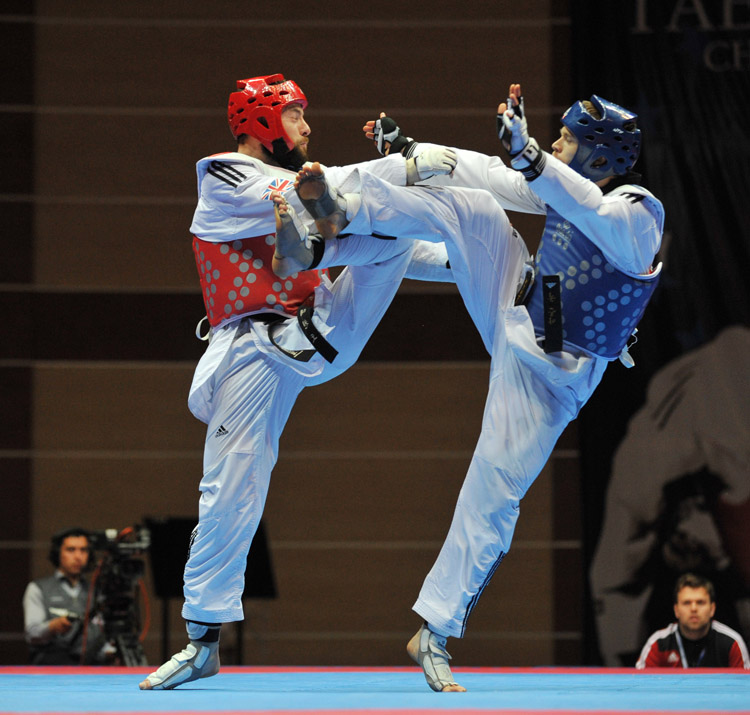
Damon Sansum (red) from Great Britain against Aaron Cook (blue) representing Isle of Man in the minus 80 kg men's final.

| Event | Gold | Silver | Bronze |
|---|---|---|---|
| −54 kg | Stepan Dimitrov; Moldova | Georgios Simitsis; Greece | Jesús Tortosa Cabrera; Spain |
| −54 kg | Stepan Dimitrov; Moldova | Georgios Simitsis; Greece | Mehmet Dolas; Turkey |
| −58 kg | Rui Bragança; Portugal | Levent Tuncat; Germany | Dylan Chellamootoo; France |
| −58 kg | Rui Bragança; Portugal | Levent Tuncat; Germany | Ruslan Poiseev; Russia |
| −63 kg | Jaouad Achab; Belgium | Jure Pantar; Slovenia | Ioannis Pilavakis; Cyprus |
| −63 kg | Jaouad Achab; Belgium | Jure Pantar; Slovenia | Mário Silva; Portugal |
| −68 kg | Servet Tazegul; Turkey | Alexey Denisenko; Russia | Vladislav Arventii; Moldova |
| −68 kg | Servet Tazegul; Turkey | Alexey Denisenko; Russia | Ruebyn Richards; Great Britain |
| −74 kg | Albert Gaun; Russia | Torann Maizeroi; France | Andrew Deer; Great Britain |
| −74 kg | Albert Gaun; Russia | Torann Maizeroi; France | Ilkin Shahbazov; Azerbaijan |
| −80 kg | Aaron Cook; Isle of Man | Damon Sansum; Great Britain | Mamedy Doucara; France |
| −80 kg | Aaron Cook; Isle of Man | Damon Sansum; Great Britain | Ramin Azizov; Azerbaijan |
| −87 kg | Radik Isayev; Azerbaijan | M'bar N'Diaye; France | Lutalo Muhammad; Great Britain |
| −87 kg | Radik Isayev; Azerbaijan | M'bar N'Diaye; France | Ali Sarı; Turkey |
| +87 kg | Arman-Marshall Silla; Belarus | Vedran Golec; Croatia | Leonardo Basile; Italy |
| +87 kg | Arman-Marshall Silla; Belarus | Vedran Golec; Croatia | Volker Wodzich; Germany |

=== Women ===
| Event | Gold | Silver | Bronze |
|---|---|---|---|
| −46 kg | Hajer Mustapha; France | Iryna Romoldanova; Ukraine | Asia Bailey; Great Britain |
| −46 kg | Hajer Mustapha; France | Iryna Romoldanova; Ukraine | Mateja Kunović; Croatia |
| −49 kg | Lucija Zaninović; Croatia | Yasmina Aziez; France | Ivett Gonda; Hungary |
| −49 kg | Lucija Zaninović; Croatia | Yasmina Aziez; France | Svetlana Igumenova; Russia |
| −53 kg | Ana Zaninovic; Croatia | Ekaterina Kim; Russia | Suvi Mikkonen; Finland |
| −53 kg | Ana Zaninovic; Croatia | Ekaterina Kim; Russia | Floriane Liborio; France |
| −57 kg | Eva Calvo Gomez; Spain | Jade Jones; Great Britain | Gunay Aghakishiyeva; Azerbaijan |
| −57 kg | Eva Calvo Gomez; Spain | Jade Jones; Great Britain | Nikita Glasnović; Sweden |
| −62 kg | Nina Klaey; Switzerland | Marina Sumić; Croatia | Magda Wiet-Hénin; France |
| −62 kg | Nina Klaey; Switzerland | Marina Sumić; Croatia | Rabia Gülec; Germany |
| −67 kg | Anastasia Baryshnikova; Russia | Haby Niare; France | Nur Tatar; Turkey |
| −67 kg | Anastasia Baryshnikova; Russia | Haby Niare; France | Farida Azizova; Azerbaijan |
| −73 kg | Iva Radoš; Croatia | Milica Mandić; Serbia | Aleksandra Krzemieniecka; Poland |
| −73 kg | Iva Radoš; Croatia | Milica Mandić; Serbia | Furkan Asena Aydın; Turkey |
| +73 kg | Bianca Walkden; Great Britain | Olga Ivanova; Russia | Ana Bajić; Serbia |
| +73 kg | Bianca Walkden; Great Britain | Olga Ivanova; Russia | Rosana Simón Álamo; Spain |

== Participating nations ==
- Albania
- Andorra
- Austria
- Azerbaijan
- Belarus
- Belgium
- Bosnia and Herzegovina
- Bulgaria
- Croatia
- Czech Republic
- Cyprus
- Denmark
- Finland
- France
- Georgia
- Germany
- Great Britain
- Greece
- Hungary
- Iceland
- Ireland
- Isle of Man (1)
- Israel
- Italy
- Latvia (3)
- Lithuania (4)
- Macedonia
- Moldova
- Monaco
- Montenegro
- Netherlands
- Norway
- Poland
- Portugal
- Romania
- Russia
- San Marino
- Scotland
- Serbia
- Slovakia
- Slovenia
- Spain
- Sweden
- Switzerland
- Turkey
- Ukraine
