= Aleksey Denisenko =

Russian taekwondo practitioner

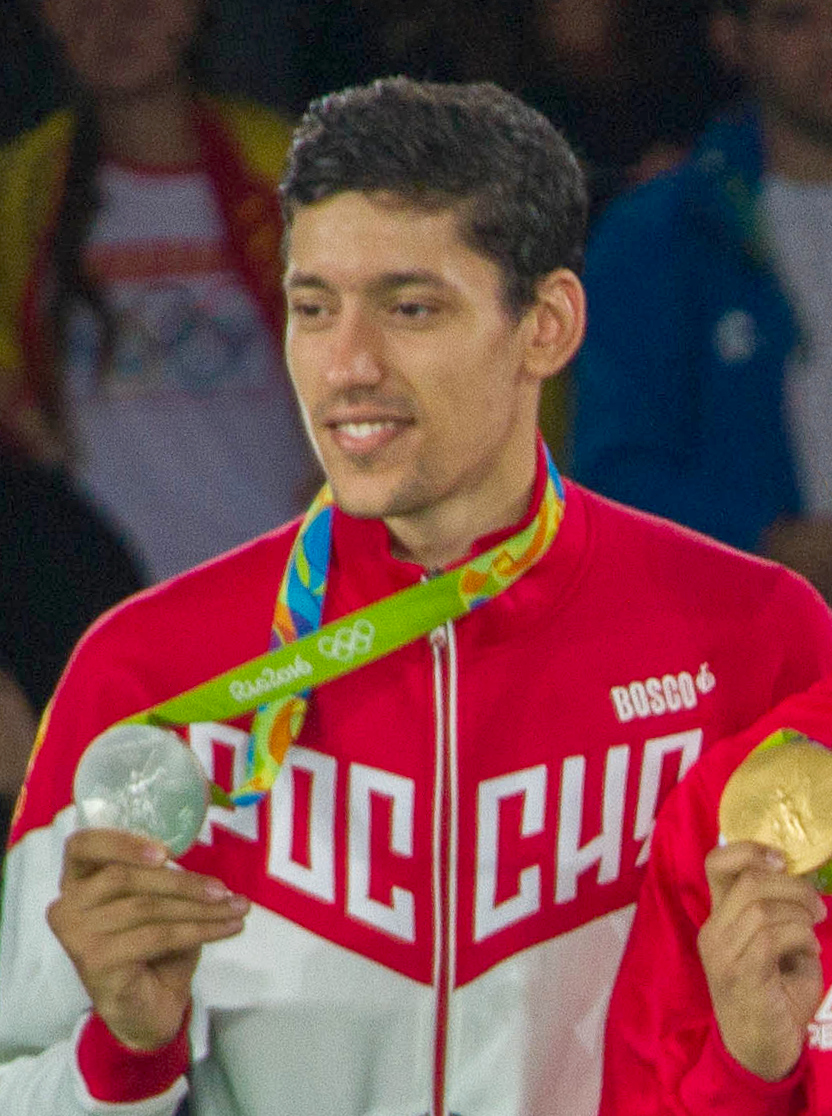
- Denisenko at the 2016 Olympics

Personal information
- Born: 30 August 1993 (age 32) Bataysk, Russia
- Education: Institute of Social and Pedagogical Technologies and Resources, Naberezhnye Chelny
- Height: 185 cm (6 ft 1 in)

Sport
- Country: Russia
- Sport: Taekwondo
- Club: Grandmaster Taekwondo Club, Rostov
- Coached by: Stanislav Khan
Medal record
Representing Russia
Olympic Games
Silver medal – second place	2016 Rio de Janeiro	68 kg
Bronze medal – third place	2012 London	58 kg
World Championships
Silver medal – second place	2015 Chelyabinsk	68 kg
Bronze medal – third place	2019 Manchester	68 kg
European Championships
Silver medal – second place	2014 Baku	68 kg
European Games
Bronze medal – third place	2015 Baku	68 kg
Grand Prix
Gold medal – first place	2013 Manchester	68 kg
Gold medal – first place	2014 Astana	68 kg
Gold medal – first place	2014 Querétaro	68 kg
Gold medal – first place	2015 Samsun	68 kg
Gold medal – first place	2018 Moscow	68 kg
Silver medal – second place	2017 Moscow	68 kg
Silver medal – second place	2018 Rome	68 kg

Alexey Alexeyevich Denisenko (Russian: Алексей Алексеевич Денисенко; born 30 August 1993) is a Russian taekwondo practitioner. He won a bronze medal at the 2012 Olympics in the 58 kg division and a silver at the 2016 Rio Games in the 68 weight category. In 2012 and 2016 he was awarded the Medal of the Order "For Merit to the Fatherland" (of the second and first degree, respectively).

In December 2016, Denisenko married Russian taekwondo fighter Anastasia Baryshnikova. He is of Gypsie descent.
