= Kim So-hee (taekwondo, born 1992) =

South Korean taekwondo practitioner

Personal information
- Nationality: South Korean
- Born: 28 July 1992 (age 34)

Sport
- Sport: Taekwondo
Medal record
Women's taekwondo
Representing South Korea
World Championships
| Gold medal – first place | 2013 Puebla | Featherweight |
| Bronze medal – third place | 2017 Muju | Lightweight |

Korean name
- Hangul: 김소희
- RR: Gim Sohui
- MR: Kim Sohŭi

Kim So-hee (born 28 July 1992) is a South Korean taekwondo practitioner.

She won a gold medal in featherweight at the 2013 World Taekwondo Championships in Puebla, by defeating Anna-Lena Frömming in the semifinal, and Mayu Hamada in the final. She won a bronze medal in lightweight at the 2017 World Taekwondo Championships, being defeated in the semifinal by eventual gold medalist Ruth Gbagbi.
