= Anastasia Baryshnikova =

Russian taekwondo practitioner

Anastasia Baryshnikova Анастасия Барышникова
Personal information
- Full name: Anastasia Vladimirovna Baryshnikova
- Nationality: Russian
- Born: 19 December 1990 (age 35) Chelyabinsk, Soviet Union
- Height: 1.73 m (5 ft 8 in)
- Weight: 67 kg (148 lb)

Sport
- Country: Russia
- Sport: Taekwondo
- Event: Welterweight (-67 kg)
- Club: Burevestnik Youth Sports School
- Coached by: Mikhail Puzikov
Medal record
Women's taekwondo
Representing Russia
Olympic Games
Bronze medal – third place	2012 London	+67 kg
World Championships
Bronze medal – third place	2009 Copenhagen	-73 kg
Bronze medal – third place	2011 Gyeongju	-73 kg
European Games
Gold medal – first place	2015 Baku	-67 kg
European Championships
Gold medal – first place	2010 Saint Petersburg	-73 kg
Gold medal – first place	2012 Manchester	-73 kg
Gold medal – first place	2014 Baku	-67 kg
Grand Prix
Gold medal – first place	2015 Samsun	-67 kg
Gold medal – first place	2014 Manchester	-67 kg
Silver medal – second place	2014 Suzhou	-67 kg
Bronze medal – third place	2014 Astana	-67 kg
Bronze medal – third place	2014 Querétaro	-67 kg

Anastasia Vladimirovna Baryshnikova (Russian: Анастасия Владимировна Барышникова; born 19 December 1990 in Chelyabinsk) is a Russian taekwondo practitioner. An Olympic bronze medalist in 2012, Baryshnikova won the gold medal in the women's middleweight class at the 2010 European Taekwondo Championships. She also competed at the 2016 Summer Olympics.

In December 2016, Baryshnikova married Russian taekwondo fighter Aleksey Denisenko.
