= Marlène Nidecker =

French taekwondo practitioner

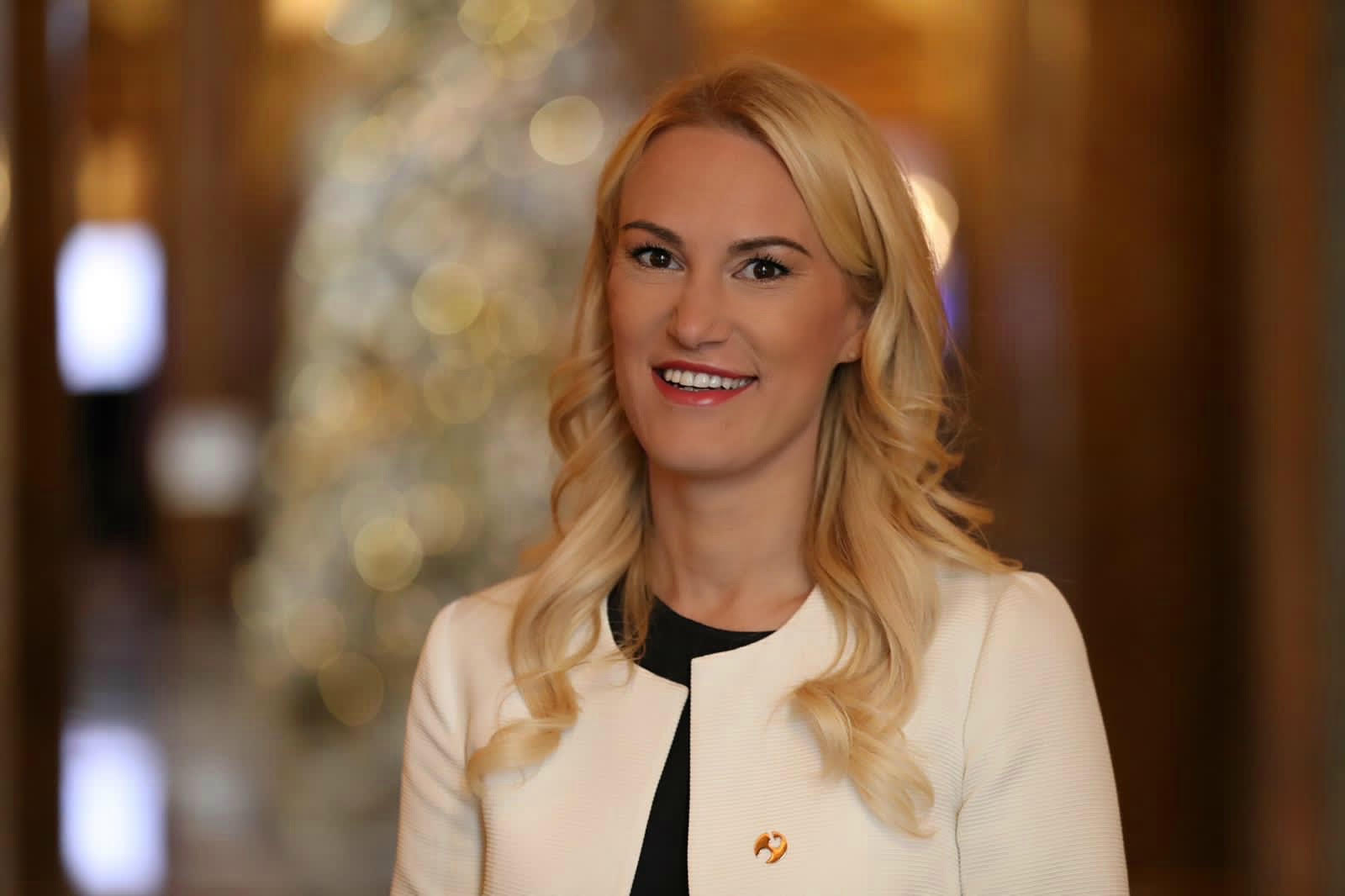

Personal information
- Full name: Marlène Olivia Nidecker
- Born: 22 October 1986 (age 40) Montreal, Quebec, Canada
- Height: 5 ft 8 in (173 cm)

Sport
- Country: Canada
Medal record
Women's taekwondo
Representing France
Olympic Games
Bronze medal – third place	2012 London	Lightweight (−57 kg)
World Championships
Bronze medal – third place	2011 Gyeongju	Featherweight (−57 kg)
European Championships
Gold medal – first place	2008 Rome	Lightweight (−63 kg)
Gold medal – first place	2012 Manchester	Lightweight (−62 kg)
Bronze medal – third place	2010 Saint Petersburg	Welterweight (−67 kg)
Universiade
Gold medal – first place	2011 Shenzhen	Featherweight (−57 kg)
Bronze medal – third place	2009 Belgrade	Lightweight (−63 kg)

Marlène Olivia Nidecker (born 22 October 1986) is an internationally recognized sports leader, board member of the Nidecker Group, taekwondo Olympic medalist and Knight of the National Order of Merit decorated by the President of France. She represents Peace and Sport, placed under the High Patronage of H.S.H. Prince Albert II of Monaco, and holds an MBA with Honors from the International University of Monaco.

She is a two-time European Champion, World University Champion, a World Taekwondo Championships medalist, and has reached the world number one ranking.

== Biography ==
=== Personal life ===
She is married to Henry Nidecker, CEO of Nidecker Group and Founder of EQUIP, the civil wedding was held in Monaco in 2024. In 2026, they welcomed twins Lilí and Henrí VI, born in Geneva, Switzerland. The Baptism was celebrated at Monaco Cathedral and gathered international guests.

=== Taekwondo competition ===
Nidecker started to practice Taekwondo at the age of 4. She earned a black belt at 9 and won a junior national championship. At 13, she won a bronze medal at the 2000 World Junior Championships, and was recruited by the French taekwondo federation.

She joined the CREPS Aix-en-Provence for the 2001-2002 sport season with Pascal Gentil and Mamedy Doucara. She won the Francophone World Cup in the -67 kg division. She returned to Canada after a year and put her premature career on hold, until Myriam Baverel invited her back to the CREPS Aix-en-Provence in 2006.

While in France, she trained and studied, earning a certificate in physical education and a master's degree (bac+4) in sport management, but could not compete professionally because her French citizenship was still pending. In 2008, just days after receiving her French naturalization, Nidecker won the European Championships in the -63 kg category.

In 2008, Nidecker joined the National Institute of Sport, Expertise and Performance (INSEP) in Paris to prepare for the London Olympics. Two times European Champion, World university Champion and medalist, she dominated the international scene and won the US Open, Russia Open, Israel Open, Paris International Tournament, and Deutsch Open, and medalled at the World Taekwondo Championships. She also won an Olympic quota for France at the World Olympic Qualification Tournament in Kazan, Russia.

Nidecker won a bronze medal at the 2012 London Summer Olympics. She beat Yeny Contreras in the first round, followed by Hedaya Wahba in the quarter-finals. She then lost to Hou Yuzhuo in the semi-finals. This enabled her to take part in the bronze medal repechage, where she beat Mayu Hamada.

=== Sports patronage ===
In 2014, she founded the Fondation Heart Angel in Abidjan, Ivory Coast to promote education, culture and sports in West Africa. The foundation supported the athletes Cheick Cissé and Ruth Gbagbi who won historic medals for their country at the 2016 Rio Summer Olympics.

In 2016, Nidecker became a Champion for Peace representing the Peace and Sport organisation, under the High Patronage of Prince Albert II of Monaco. She actively promotes peace through sport and doing field actions all over the world.

In parallel to her sport career, she completed a BA (Journalism and Communications) at the Centre de Formation de Journalistes de Paris, starred in an advertising campaign for Allianz with Ladji Doucouré and Blune with Mazarine Pingeot, and worked for various media outlets such as Eurosport, Canal+ Africa and France Televisions, covering the 2016 Rio Summer Olympics. She is also involved with various foundations and is an ambassador for "Un Maillot Pour la Vie" and Fondation Heart Angel.

Nidecker is also the founder and president of the Caravan for Peace, a humanitarian action supported by athletes such as Didier Drogba, Ladji Doucouré and Daba Modibo Keita. The goal is to unite sports celebrities to promote a message of peace and use sport as a tool for development. In 2017, for the first edition, the sports celebrities visited villages in Senegal and launched water fountains near sports fields. In 2018, during UNESCO's International Day for Philosophy, she was appointed Ambassador of the International center for youth philosophy PhiloJeunes.

== Results ==
2012

- (bronze) 2012 Summer Olympics in London, UK
- (gold) 2012 European Taekwondo Championships in Manchester, England
- (gold) US Open in Las Vegas, USA
- (silver) World Team Championship in Santa Cruz, Aruba

2011

- (gold) 2011 Summer Universiade in Shenzhen, China
- (bronze) 2011 World Taekwondo Championships in Gyeongju, South Korea
- (gold) French National Championships
- (gold) Russia Open
- (gold) Israel Open
- (gold) Tournoi International de Paris

2010

- (gold) Tournoi International de Paris
- (gold) French National Championships
- (bronze) 2010 European Taekwondo Championships in Saint Petersburg, Russia
- (bronze) European Team Cup

2009

- (bronze) 2011 Summer Universiade in Belgrade, Serbia

2008

- (gold) 2008 European Taekwondo Championships in Rome
- (gold) Deutsch Open

2007

- (gold) World Open Mexico
- (gold) Spanish Open
- (gold) Jerusalem Open

2006

- (gold) Copa d’Andorra
- (gold) Jerusalem Open
- (gold) Bilbao Open

Also

- (bronze) Junior Taekwondo Championships, Killarney - Ireland (2000)
- (gold) Korea Open (2003)
- (gold) Francophone World Cup (2002)
- (gold) US Open (1999)
- (gold) Canadian National Championships (1997 to 2002)

== Honours ==
- In March 2013, she was elevated to the rank of Chevalier de l'Ordre National du Mérite by the President of France at the Elysee Palace.
- In 2018, she was decorated by United Nations peacekeeping forces alongside singer and philanthropist Akon for her contribution in Africa
