= Edina Kotsis =

Hungarian taekwondo practitioner

Personal information
- Nationality: Hungarian
- Born: 27 June 1990 (age 36)

Sport
- Sport: Taekwondo
Medal record
Representing Hungary
Women's taekwondo
World Championships
Bronze medal – third place	2015 Chelyabinsk	Featherweight
European Championships
Silver medal – second place	2012 Manchester	-57 kg

Edina Kotsis (born 27 June 1990) is a Hungarian taekwondo practitioner.

She won a bronze medal in featherweight at the 2015 World Taekwondo Championships, after being defeated by Eva Calvo in the semifinal. Her achievements at the European Taekwondo Championships include a silver medal in 2012; she also participated in 2008, 2010, 2014, and 2018.
