= Deborah Louz =

Dutch taekwondo practitioner (born 1980)

Deborah Louz (born 6 February 1980 in Leidschendam) is a Dutch taekwondo practitioner who won a bronze medal in the 57 kg weight class at the 2010 European Taekwondo Championships.
