= Naima Bakkal =

Moroccan taekwondo practitioner

Personal information
- Nationality: Moroccan
- Born: 28 August 1990 (age 35)

Sport
- Sport: Taekwondo

Naima Bakkal (born 28 August 1990) is a Moroccan taekwondo athlete.

She represented Morocco at the 2016 Summer Olympics in Rio de Janeiro, in the women's 57 kg.
