= Anna-Lena Frömming =

German taekwondo practitioner

Personal information
- Nationality: German
- Born: 18 February 1995 (age 31)
- Height: 1.75 m (5 ft 9 in)

Sport
- Country: Germany
- Sport: Taekwondo
- Event: –57 kg
- Club: TaeKwonDo Özer e. V.

Achievements and titles
- World finals: 3rd place, bronze medalist(s)
Medal record
Women's taekwondo
Representing Germany
World Championships
Bronze medal – third place	2013 Puebla	57 kg
Military World Games
Silver medal – second place	2015 Mungyeong	57 kg
Bronze medal – third place	2019 Wuhan	57 kg
World Military Championships
Bronze medal – third place	2018 Rio de Janeiro	57 kg
European U21 Championships
Bronze medal – third place	2013 Chișinău	57 kg
Bronze medal – third place	2014 Innsbruck	62 kg
World Junior Championships
Bronze medal – third place	2012 Sharm El Sheikh	55 kg
European Junior Championships
Gold medal – first place	2011 Paphos	55 kg
Bronze medal – third place	2009 Trelleborg	49 kg
European Cadet Championships
Silver medal – second place	2007 Budapest	37 kg
- Updated on 1 September 2024

Anna-Lena Frömming (born 18 February 1995) is a German taekwondo athlete.

== Career ==
Anna-Lena Frömming began practising the Korean martial art of taekwondo in 2001. In 2007, she was runner-up in the European Cadet Championships in Budapest, and in 2009 she again achieved a European medal, winning a bronze at the European Junior Championships in Trelleborg. In 2011, she became European Junior Champion in the 55 kg weight class in Paphos.

In 2012, Frömming won a bronze medal in the same category at the World Junior Championships in Sharm El-Sheikh. She won two more bronze medals at the 2013 and 2014 European Under-21 Championships in Chișinău and Innsbruck.

In the senior category, she won bronze in the weight class up to 57 kg at the 2013 World Taekwondo Championships in Puebla. In 2015, Frömming took part in the European Games and the Universiade. This was followed by podium places at the Military World Games, a silver medal in 2015 in Mungyeong and a bronze medal in 2019 in Wuhan. In 2017, Frömming took part in the Universiade for a second time, before winning bronze at the 2018 World Military Championships in Rio de Janeiro.

In 2016, Frömming took part in the European qualifying tournament for the Olympic Games to be held in Rio de Janeiro, where she achieved a third place and was therefore unable to qualify for a quota place for the Olympic competition. At the 2021 Women's Taekwondo World Championships in Riyadh, she won a bronze medal in the 62 kg category. Due to a metacarpal fracture, Frömming had to take a break for several months in 2023 and finished 9th at the World Championships in Baku in the same year. She also took part in the European Games for a second time in 2023.

== Personal life ==
Frömming has studied Psychology.
