= Arman-Marshall Silla =

Belarusian taekwondo practitioner (born 1994)

Personal information
- Nationality: Belarusian
- Born: 13 July 1994 (age 32)

Sport
- Sport: Taekwondo

Arman-Marshall Silla (born 13 July 1994) is a Belarusian taekwondo athlete. He represented Belarus at the 2016 Summer Olympics in Rio de Janeiro, in the men's +80 kg.
