= Eva Calvo (taekwondo) =

Spanish taekwondo practitioner

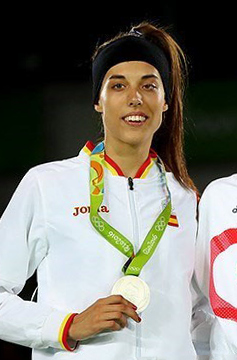
- Calvo at the 2016 Olympics

Personal information
- Full name: Eva Calvo Gómez
- Nationality: Spanish
- Born: 29 July 1991 (age 34) Madrid, Spain
- Height: 176 cm (5 ft 9 in)

Sport
- Country: Spain
- Sport: Taekwondo
- Club: Club Sanchez Elez
- Coached by: Jose Maria Martin
Medal record
Olympic Games
Silver medal – second place	2016 Rio de Janeiro	57 kg
World Championships
Silver medal – second place	2015 Chelyabinsk	57 kg
Bronze medal – third place	2013 Puebla	57 kg
Grand Prix
Gold medal – first place	2013 Manchester	57 kg
Gold medal – first place	2014 Suzhou	57 kg
Gold medal – first place	2014 Astana	57 kg
Gold medal – first place	2014 Manchester	57 kg
Silver medal – second place	2014 Querétaro	57 kg
Silver medal – second place	2014 Manchester	57 kg
Silver medal – second place	2014 Mexico City	57 kg
European Games
Bronze medal – third place	2015 Baku	57 kg
European Championships
Gold medal – first place	2014 Baku	57 kg
Mediterranean Games
Gold medal – first place	2013 Mersin	57 kg
Universiade
Silver medal – second place	2011 Shenzhen	62 kg
European U21 Championships
Bronze medal – third place	2010 Kharkiv	62 kg

Eva Calvo Gómez (born 29 July 1991) is a Spanish taekwondo practitioner who competes in the 57 kg division. She was the European champion in 2014 and won silver medals at the 2015 World Championships and 2016 Olympics. In 2015, she was named Best Female Athlete of the Year by the Spanish National Taekwondo Federation.

Calvo first trained in athletics and took up taekwondo in 2006, aged 15. Her younger sister Marta Calvo also competes internationally, but in the heavier 62 kg division. Calvo studies computer engineering and mathematics at the Autonomous University of Madrid.
