= Gunay Aghakishiyeva =

Azerbaijani taekwondo practitioner (born 1990)

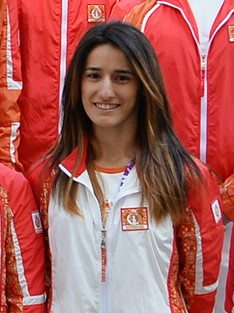

Medal record

Women's taekwondo

Representing Azerbaijan

European Championships
Bronze medal – third place	2014 Baku	Featherweight

Islamic Solidarity Games
Silver medal – second place	2013 Palembang	Featherweight

Gunay Aghakishiyeva (Azerbaijani: Günay Ağakişiyeva; born 12 May 1990 in Baku) is an Azerbaijani taekwondo practitioner competing in the featherweight division.

== Career ==
Gunay Aghakishiyeva won a silver medal at the 2013 Islamic Solidarity Games held in Palembang, Indonesia. At the 2014 European Taekwondo Championships held in Baku, Azerbaijan, she won the bronze medal in the featherweight division.
