= Nikita Glasnović =

Swedish Taekwondo practitioner

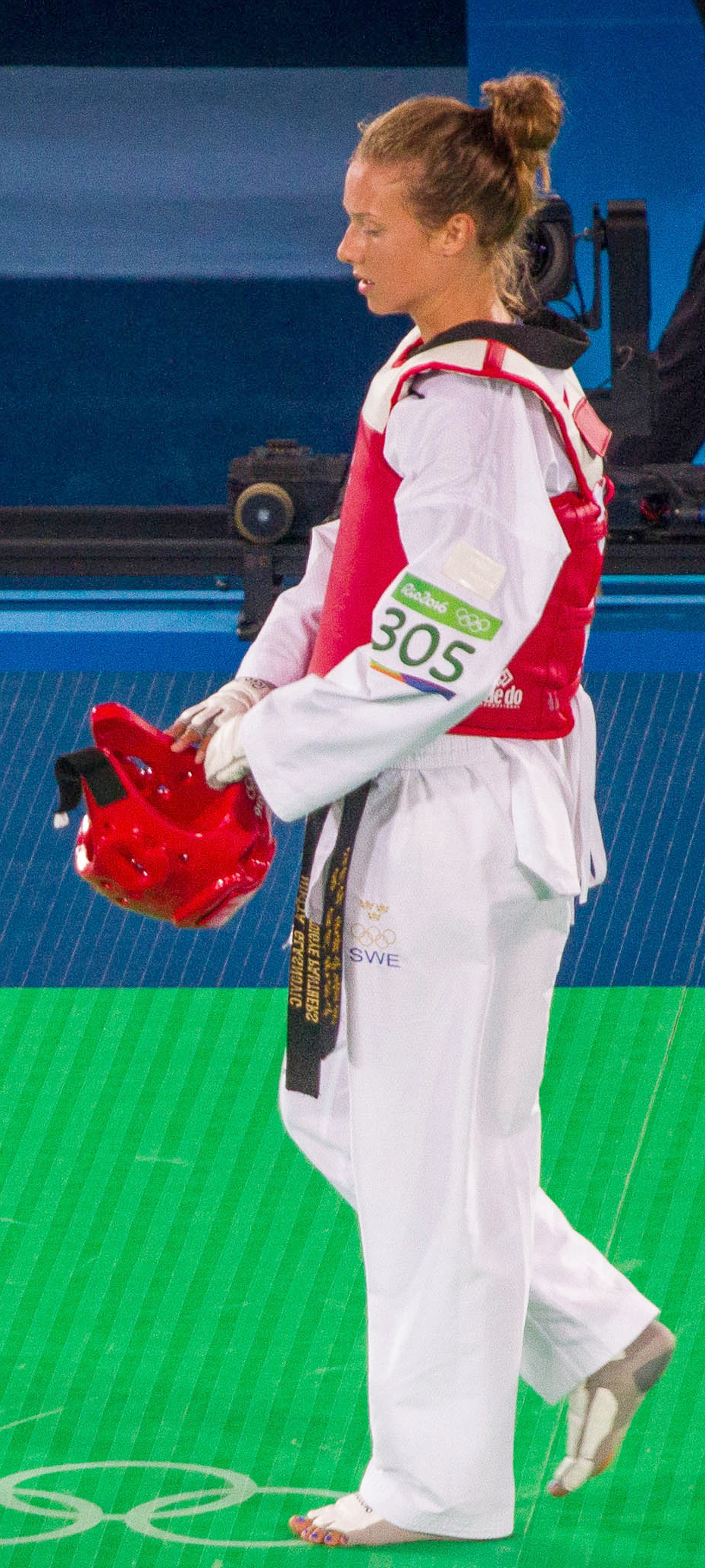
- Glasnović at the 2016 Olympics

Personal information
- Nationality: Croatian
- Born: 17 January 1995 (age 31) Malmö, Sweden
- Height: 1.75 m (5 ft 9 in)
- Weight: 57 kg (126 lb)

Sport
- Country: Croatia
- Sport: Taekwondo
- Event: Featherweight ( –57 kg)
- Club: Toigye Taekwondo Club
- Coached by: Mario Glasnović (father)
Medal record
Representing Sweden
World Championships
Bronze medal – third place	2017 Muzu	57 kg
European Games
Bronze medal – third place	2015 Baku	57 kg
European Championships
Silver medal – second place	2016 Montreux	57 kg
Bronze medal – third place	2014 Baku	57 kg
Representing Croatia
Mediterranean Games
Bronze medal – third place	2018 Tarragona	57 kg

Nikita Glasnović (born 17 January 1995) is a Swedish-born Croatian taekwondo practitioner. She represented Sweden at the 2016 Summer Olympics in the 57 kg division, and lost a bronze medal match to Kimia Alizadeh.

Nikita and her younger brother Leon train at the Toigye Taekwondo Club in Malmö, which is run by their father, Mario Glasnovic; she took up taekwondo aged four. She is named after the lead character in Luc Besson's movie La Femme Nikita, and her brother received his name after the protagonist of Léon: The Professional. In 2011, she was selected as Malmö Most Promising Female Athlete of the Year and in 2015 as the Malmö Female Athlete of the Year. She failed to qualify for the 2016 Olympics by a one point at the 2015 Grand Prix final, where she finished fourth, yet she was invited to the Olympics after withdrawal of one of the competitors, Huang Yun-wen. She studied media and communications at Lund University in 2014–15, and rhetorics at Linnaeus University in 2015. In 2016, she enrolled to the art history program at Umea University and to courses in Bosnian, Serbian and Croatian languages and literature at Uppsala University.
