= Reshmie Oogink =

Dutch taekwondo practitioner (born 1989)

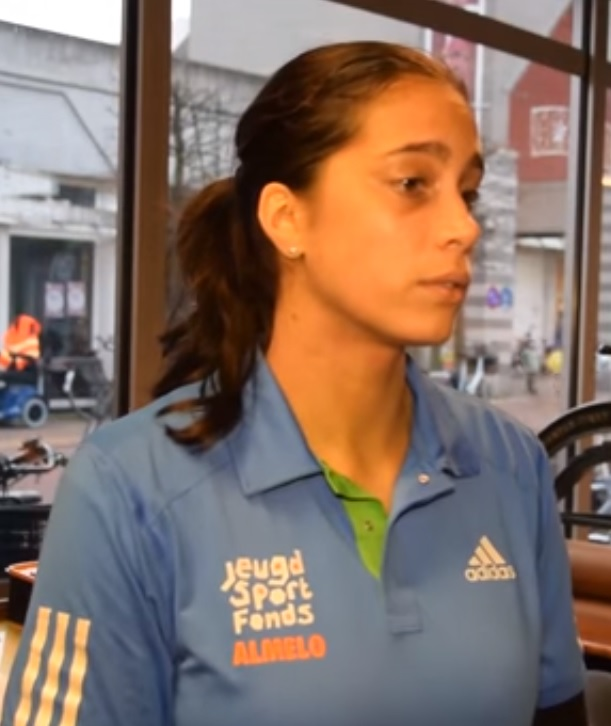
- Reshmie Oogink in 2016

Personal information
- Nationality: Dutch
- Born: 26 October 1989 (age 36) Almelo, Netherlands
- Height: 1.79 m (5 ft 10 in)
- Weight: 67 kg (148 lb)

Sport
- Sport: Taekwondo
- Coached by: Nelson Saenz Miller, Michael Oogink, Edward Fong
Medal record
Representing the Netherlands
Women's taekwondo
World Championships
Bronze medal – third place	2017 Muju	Middleweight

Reshmie Oogink (born 26 October 1989) is a Dutch taekwondo athlete.

She represented the Netherlands at the 2016 Summer Olympics in Rio de Janeiro, in the women's +67 kg. She won a bronze medal in middleweight at the 2017 World Taekwondo Championships. She represented the Netherlands at the 2020 Summer Olympics in Tokyo, in the women's +67 kg coached by Edward Fong.
