= Mayu Hamada =

Japanese taekwondo practitioner

Personal information
- Born: 31 January 1994 (age 32) Saga, Japan
- Height: 1.74 m (5 ft 9 in)
- Weight: 57 kg (126 lb)

Sport
- Country: Japan
- Sport: Taekwondo
- Event: –57 kg
Medal record
Women's taekwondo
Representing Japan
World Championships
Gold medal – first place	2015 Chelyabinsk	Featherweight
Silver medal – second place	2013 Puebla	Featherweight
Asian Games
Silver medal – second place	2014 Incheon	Featherweight
Asian Championships
Bronze medal – third place	2012 Ho Chi Minh City	Featherweight
- Updated on 20 August 2016

Mayu Hamada (濱田 真由, Hamada Mayu; born 31 January 1994) is a Japanese taekwondo practitioner. She participated in the 2012 and 2016 Summer Olympics.
