= World Taekwondo Grand Prix =

Taekwondo competition

- Current event or competition: 2024 World Taekwondo Grand Prix

Competition details
- Discipline: Taekwondo
- Type: kyourugui
- Organiser: World Taekwondo (WT)

History
- First edition: 2013 in Manchester, United Kingdom
- Editions: 10 (2024)
- Most wins: South Korea

The World Taekwondo Grand Prix is a taekwondo competition introduced by the World Taekwondo Federation in 2013 to provide a homogeneous system for qualification to the Olympic taekwondo tournament. It consists of four competitions per year in each Olympic weight category event. Olympic events occur at approximately half the weight classes as WTF-organised tournaments.

== Venues ==
The most common format of the event has been a series of three Grand Prix, followed by a Grand Final. The first Grand Prix in 2013, and the event in 2016, were single leg competitions, while the 2018 edition had a 4th Grand Prix leg before the Grand Final. The original Grand Prix was held in Manchester, England, recognising the sport's popularity in the United Kingdom, and Manchester remains the most visited venue, with 5 Grand Prix events, while the United Kingdom is also the most visited country, with six events. Russia, Mexico and Italy have also hosted multiple legs.

The 2020 event was to be a single event in Cancún, but was cancelled due to the Covid pandemic, while the 2021 event was abandoned for the same reason, without being officially arranged. The event returned in Rome for an eighth season in 2022.

Year	GP 1	GP 2	GP 3	GP 4	GP Final
2013					(United Kingdom) Manchester
2014	(China) Suzhou	(Kazakhstan) Astana	(United Kingdom) Manchester		(Mexico) Querétaro
2015	(Russia) Moscow	(Turkey) Samsun	(United Kingdom) Manchester		Mexico City
2016					(Azerbaijan) Baku
2017	(Russia) Moscow	(Morocco) Rabat	(United Kingdom) London		(Ivory Coast) Abidjan
2018	(Italy) Rome	(Russia) Moscow	(Taiwan) Taoyuan	(United Kingdom) Manchester	(United Arab Emirates) Fujairah
2019	(Italy) Rome	(Japan) Chiba	(Bulgaria) Sofia		(Russia) Moscow
2020					(Mexico) Cancún(Canceled)
2022	(Italy) Rome	(France) Paris	(United Kingdom) Manchester		(Saudi Arabia) Riyadh
2023	(Italy) Rome	(France) Paris	(China) Taiyuan		(United Kingdom) Manchester
2024					(China) Taiyuan
2026	(Italy) Rome	(South Korea) Muju	(France) Paris		(Kazakhstan) Astana

== All-time medal table ==
All-time medal count as World Taekwondo Grand Prix Final Manchester 2023

Rank	Nation	Gold	Silver	Bronze	Total
1	South Korea	53	41	52	146
2	China	28	14	28	70
3	Russia	25	17	24	66
4	Great Britain	23	28	26	77
5	Iran	14	17	30	61
6	Thailand	12	4	3	19
7	Turkey	11	11	31	53
8	Ivory Coast	11	4	9	24
9	Spain	10	18	23	51
10	France	8	9	17	34
11	Jordan	5	4	7	16
12	Italy	5	1	7	13
13	Croatia	4	8	19	31
14	Uzbekistan	4	5	14	23
15	Serbia	3	5	9	17
16	Chinese Taipei	3	4	9	16
17	Tunisia	3	4	3	10
18	United States	3	3	16	22
19	Brazil	2	5	8	15
20	Sweden	2	3	3	8
21	Azerbaijan	2	1	7	10
22	Germany	2	1	5	8
23	Poland	2	1	3	6
24	Mexico	1	10	13	24
25	Egypt	1	6	7	14
26	Belgium	1	5	5	11
27	Canada	1	3	5	9
28	Hungary	1	2	1	4
29	Gabon	1	1	2	4
29	Netherlands	1	1	2	4
31	Isle of Man	1	1	1	3
31	Norway	1	1	1	3
33	Cuba	1	1	0	2
33	Kazakhstan	1	1	0	2
35	Portugal	1	0	2	3
–	Individual Neutral Athletes ^{a}	1	0	1	2
36	Moldova	0	3	1	4
37	Morocco	0	1	2	3
37	Vietnam	0	1	2	3
39	Greece	0	1	1	2
39	Slovenia	0	1	1	2
41	Puerto Rico	0	1	0	1
42	Japan	0	0	6	6
43	Argentina	0	0	5	5
44	Australia	0	0	4	4
45	Belarus	0	0	3	3
45	North Macedonia	0	0	3	3
47	Ireland	0	0	2	2
48	Colombia	0	0	1	1
48	Czech Republic	0	0	1	1
48	Dominican Republic	0	0	1	1
48	Latvia	0	0	1	1
48	Mali	0	0	1	1
48	Niger	0	0	1	1
48	Nigeria	0	0	1	1
48	Panama	0	0	1	1
48	Ukraine	0	0	1	1
Totals (56 entries)		248	248	432	928

== Multiple gold medalists ==
The table shows those who have won at least three gold medals. As of World Taekwondo Grand Prix Final Manchester 2023

Men

Athlete	Country	Gold medal	Silver medal	Bronze medal	Total
Lee Dae-hoon	South Korea	12	3	2	17
Cheick Sallah Cissé	Ivory Coast	7	3	6	16
Vladislav Larin	Russia	7	3	0	10
Jang Jun	South Korea	7	2	2	11
Kim Tae-hun	South Korea	6	4	5	15
Aleksey Denisenko	Russia	6	3	1	10
Maksim Khramtsov	Russia	5	4	1	10
In Kyo-don	South Korea	4	6	1	11
Farzan Ashourzadeh	Iran	3	3	2	8
Mehdi Khodabakhshi	Iran	3	1	1	5
Simone Alessio	Italy	3	1	0	4

Women

Athlete	Country	Gold medal	Silver medal	Bronze medal	Total
Panipak Wongpattanakit	Thailand	12	2	1	15
Jade Jones	Great Britain	10	7	1	18
Zheng Shuyin	China	8	1	4	13
Luo Zongshi	China	6	1	1	8
Bianca Walkden	Great Britain	5	8	3	16
Kim So-hui	South Korea	5	6	1	12
Wu Jingyu	China	5	2	0	7
Lee Da-bin	South Korea	5	1	5	11
Eva Calvo	Spain	4	3	0	7
Ruth Gbagbi	Ivory Coast	4	1	3	8
Magda Wiet-Henin	France	3	1	4	8

== See also ==
- World Taekwondo Championships
- World Cup Taekwondo Team Championships
