= Turkey Taekwondo Federation =

Taekwondo Federation

- Abbreviation: TTF
- Formation: 1981; 45 years ago
- Type: Government organisation
- Purpose: Sport
- Headquarters: Ulus
- Location: Ankara, Turkey
- Region served: Turkey
- Official language: Turkish
- President: Bahri Tanrıkulu
- Parent organization: GSGM
- Website: www.turkiyetaekwondofed.gov.tr

Turkey Taekwondo Federation (Turkish: Türkiye Taekwondo Federasyonu) is the governing body of Taekwondo sport in Turkey. Originally, it was formed in 1968 within the Turkey Judo Federation, where it maintained its activities thirteen years long. In 1981, it was disconnected from the Judo Federation and became a separate organization under the governmental Directorate General of Youth and Sports (Gençlik ve Spor Genel Müdürlüğü, GSGM). The headquarters is located in Ulus quarter of Ankara. It is a member of the European Taekwondo Union (ETU).

It organizes tournaments and championships for all age groups of both genders at national level. In addition, support services like the education of referees and coaches are within its duties. Participations of Turkish Taekwondo sportspeople at all international competition events are organized by the federation.

== Presidents ==
- Mithat Kor (1981–1982)
- Esen Beder (1982–1885)
- Cengiz Yağız (1996–2003)
- Metin Şahin (2003–2024)
- Bahri Tanrıkulu (2024–)

== History ==
Taekwondo sport began in Turkey in the 1960s, and its official organizational formation took place in 1968 within the national Judo federation. In 1976, Turkey participated at the European championships, where the Turkish team came in second. Following the establishment of the self-contained federation in 1981, international success came for the women as well. In 1982, a Turkish woman became for the first time European champion and in 1987 a world champion. In 1988 and 1990, Turkish team became twice European champion. In 1995, the Turkish team placed in third rank at the World Championships. At the 1998 European Championships, Turkey national team became champion.

== International participation ==
=== Seniors ===
==== Olympic Games ====
Year	Location	Overall					Men				Women			
Year	Location	Rank	1st place, gold medalist(s)	2nd place, silver medalist(s)	3rd place, bronze medalist(s)	Total	1st place, gold medalist(s)	2nd place, silver medalist(s)	3rd place, bronze medalist(s)	Total	1st place, gold medalist(s)	2nd place, silver medalist(s)	3rd place, bronze medalist(s)	Total
2000	Australia, Sydney	13	0	0	1	1	0	0	0	0	0	0	1	1
2004	Greece, Athens	9	0	1	0	1	0	1	0	1	0	0	0	0
2008	China, Beijing	6	0	1	1	2	0	0	1	1	0	1	0	1
2012	United Kingdom, London	3rd place, bronze medalist(s)	1	1	0	2	1	0	0	1	0	1	0	1
2016	Brazil, Rio de Janeiro	14	0	0	1	1	0	0	0	0	0	0	1	1
2020	Japan, Tokyo	14	0	0	2	2	0	0	1	1	0	0	1	1
2024	France, Paris	13	0	0	1	1	0	0	0	0	0	0	1	1
Total			1	3	6	10	1	1	2	4	0	2	4	6

==== World Championships ====
Year	Location	Overall					Men				Women			
Year	Location	Rank	1st place, gold medalist(s)	2nd place, silver medalist(s)	3rd place, bronze medalist(s)	Total	1st place, gold medalist(s)	2nd place, silver medalist(s)	3rd place, bronze medalist(s)	Total	1st place, gold medalist(s)	2nd place, silver medalist(s)	3rd place, bronze medalist(s)	Total
1983	Denmark, Copenhagen	3rd place, bronze medalist(s)	1	1	1	3	1	1	1	3				
1985	South Korea, Seoul	3rd place, bronze medalist(s)	0	2	1	3	0	2	1	3				
1987	Spain, Barcelona	5	1	1	2	4	0	1	1	2	1	0	1	2
1989	South Korea, Seoul	5	0	2	4	6	0	2	1	3	0	0	3	3
1991	Greece, Athens	5	1	3	2	6	0	0	2	2	1	3	0	4
1993	United States, New York City	5	0	2	3	5	0	1	1	2	0	1	2	3
1995	Philippines, Manila	3rd place, bronze medalist(s)	2	0	2	4	1	0	0	1	1	0	2	3
1997	Hong Kong, Hong Kong	7	0	1	1	2	0	1	1	2	0	0	0	0
1999	Canada, Edmonton	6	0	3	2	5	0	3	0	3	0	0	2	2
2001	South Korea, Jeju	2nd place, silver medalist(s)	2	0	3	5	1	0	2	3	1	0	1	2
2003	Germany, Garmisch	18	0	0	1	1	0	0	1	1	0	0	0	0
2005	Spain, Madrid	8	0	1	1	2	0	0	1	1	0	1	0	1
2007	China, Beijing	7	1	1	0	2	1	0	0	1	0	1	0	1
2009	Denmark, Copenhagen	6	1	0	2	3	1	0	1	2	0	0	1	1
2011	South Korea, Gyeongju	7	1	1	4	6	1	1	1	3	0	0	3	3
2013	Mexico, Puebla	-	0	0	0	0	0	0	0	0	0	0	0	0
2015	Russia, Chelyabinsk	3rd place, bronze medalist(s)	2	1	1	4	1	0	0	1	1	1	1	3
2017	South Korea, Muju	2nd place, silver medalist(s)	2	1	0	3	0	0	0	0	2	1	0	3
2019	United Kingdom, Manchester	5	1	1	2	4	0	0	0	0	1	1	2	4
2022	Mexico, Guadalajara	14	0	1	1	2	0	0	0	0	0	1	1	2
2023	Azerbaijan, Baku	2nd place, silver medalist(s)	3	0	3	6	1	0	2	3	2	0	1	3
Total			18	22	37	74	8	12	16	36	10	10	20	40

==== European Championships ====
Year	Location	Overall					Men				Women			
Year	Location	Rank	1st place, gold medalist(s)	2nd place, silver medalist(s)	3rd place, bronze medalist(s)	Total	1st place, gold medalist(s)	2nd place, silver medalist(s)	3rd place, bronze medalist(s)	Total	1st place, gold medalist(s)	2nd place, silver medalist(s)	3rd place, bronze medalist(s)	Total
1980	Denmark, Esbjerg	7	0	1	0	1	0	1	0	1				
1982	Italy, Rome	4	2	0	2	4	0	0	2	2	2	0	0	2
1984	Germany, Stuttgart	4	2	3	2	7	1	3	2	6	1	0	0	1
1986	Austria, Seefeld	3rd place, bronze medalist(s)	3	5	2	10	1	4	1	6	2	1	1	4
1988	Turkey, Ankara	1st place, gold medalist(s)	6	5	2	13	3	3	1	7	3	2	1	6
1990	Denmark, Aarhus	1st place, gold medalist(s)	5	4	5	14	2	3	1	6	3	1	4	8
1992	Spain, Valencia	3rd place, bronze medalist(s)	2	7	3	12	0	4	2	6	2	3	1	6
1994	Croatia, Zagreb	3rd place, bronze medalist(s)	1	4	0	5	0	3	0	3	1	1	0	2
1996	Finland, Helsinki	9	0	4	4	8	0	3	1	4	0	1	3	4
1998	Netherlands, Eindhoven	3rd place, bronze medalist(s)	2	3	3	8	2	2	2	6	0	1	1	2
2000	Greece, Patras	1st place, gold medalist(s)	4	0	4	8	2	0	2	4	2	0	2	4
2002	Turkey, Samsun	1st place, gold medalist(s)	6	2	3	11	4	1	0	5	2	1	3	6
2004	Norway, Lillehammer	2nd place, silver medalist(s)	3	1	4	8	1	0	3	4	2	1	1	4
2005	Latvia, Riga	2nd place, silver medalist(s)	2	3	2	7	2	1	1	4	0	2	1	3
2006	Germany, Bonn	5	1	3	1	5	0	2	1	3	1	1	0	2
2008	Italy, Rome	1st place, gold medalist(s)	3	3	3	9	2	1	1	4	1	2	2	5
2010	Russia, Saint Petersburg	1st place, gold medalist(s)	3	2	1	6	2	1	1	4	1	1	0	2
2012	England, Manchester	2nd place, silver medalist(s)	3	1	3	7	1	1	2	4	2	0	1	3
2014	Azerbaijan, Baku	5	1	0	4	5	1	0	2	3	0	0	2	2
2016	Switzerland, Montreux	2nd place, silver medalist(s)	2	3	2	7	1	1	0	2	1	2	2	5
2018	Russia, Kazan	2nd place, silver medalist(s)	3	4	2	9	0	2	1	3	3	2	1	6
2021	Bulgaria, Sofya	5	1	2	2	5	1	0	0	1	0	2	2	4
2022	United Kingdom, Manchester	1st place, gold medalist(s)	5	2	4	11	2	1	3	6	3	1	1	5
2024	Serbia, Belgrad	2nd place, silver medalist(s)	2	5	1	8	2	1	1	4	0	4	0	4
Total			62	67	59	188	30	38	30	98	32	29	29	90

==== European Games ====
Year	Host Country	Rank	Gold	Silver	Bronze	Total
2015	Azerbaijan	11	0	0	1	1
2023	Poland	3	2	1	3	6

==== Mediterranean Games ====
Year	Host Country	Rank	Gold	Silver	Bronze	Total
2013	Turkey	1	3	1	4	8
2018	Spain	2	2	0	4	6
2022	Algeria	1	3	1	1	5

==== Universiades ====
Year	Location	Overall					Men				Women			
Year	Location	Rank	1st place, gold medalist(s)	2nd place, silver medalist(s)	3rd place, bronze medalist(s)	Total	1st place, gold medalist(s)	2nd place, silver medalist(s)	3rd place, bronze medalist(s)	Total	1st place, gold medalist(s)	2nd place, silver medalist(s)	3rd place, bronze medalist(s)	Total
2003	South Korea, Daegu	10	0	2	0	2	0	2	0	2	0	0	0	0
2005	Turkey, İzmir	2nd place, silver medalist(s)	5	2	1	8	2	1	0	3	3	1	1	5
2007	Thailand, Bangkok	5	0	1	3	4	0	0	2	2	0	1	1	2
2009	Serbia, Belgrade	14	0	1	3	4	0	1	2	3	0	0	1	1
2011	China, Shenzhen	4	2	4	4	10	1	2	3	6	1	2	1	4
2015	South Korea, Gwangju	5	1	1	6	8	1	0	1	2	0	1	5	6
2017	Taiwan, Taoyuan	4	2	1	1	4	0	0	0	0	2	1	1	4
2019	Italy, Naples	4	2	0	0	2	0	0	0	0	2	0	0	2
2021	China, Qingyang	4	2	3	4	9	2	0	3	5	0	3	1	4
Total			14	15	22	51	6	6	11	23	8	9	11	28

==== World Cup Team Championships ====
Year	Location	Men	Women	Mixed
2006	Thailand, Bangkok		2nd place, silver medalist(s)	
2009	Azerbaijan, Baku	1st place, gold medalist(s)	3rd place, bronze medalist(s)	
2010	China, Ürümqi	3rd place, bronze medalist(s)	3rd place, bronze medalist(s)	
2012	Aruba, Santa Cruz	DNP	DNP	
2013	Ivory Coast, Abidjan	DNP	DNP	
2014	Mexico, Querétaro City	DNP	DNP	
2015	Mexico, Mexico City	DNP	DNP	
2016	Mexico, Mexico City	3rd place, bronze medalist(s)	3rd place, bronze medalist(s)	
2017	Ivory Coast, Abidjan	DNP	DNP	
2018	United Arab Emirates, Fujairah	DNP	DNP	2nd place, silver medalist(s)
2019	China, Wuxi	DNP	DNP	3rd place, bronze medalist(s)

- DNP: Did not participate

=== Juniors ===
==== World Junior Championships ====
Year	Location	Overall				
Year	Location	Rank	1st place, gold medalist(s)	2nd place, silver medalist(s)	3rd place, bronze medalist(s)	Total
1998	Turkey, Istanbul	3	2	2	2	6
2000	Ireland, Killarney	11	0	3	4	7
2002	Greece, Crete	9	0	1	5	6
2004	South Korea, Suncheon	4	1	2	3	6
2006	Vietnam, Ho Chi Minh City	6	1	1	3	5
2008	Turkey, İzmir	4	1	1	4	6
2010	Mexico, Tijuana	4	2	1	4	7
2012	Egypt, Sharm el-Sheikh	10	0	3	3	6
2014	Chinese Taipei, Taipei	18	0	1	3	4
2016	Canada, Burnaby	3	2	1	5	8
2018	Tunisia, Hammamet	5	1	0	3	4
2022	Bulgaria, Sofia	4	1	0	2	3
2024	South Korea, Chuncheon	13	0	1	3	4
Total		5	11	22	39	72

==== European Junior Championships ====
Year	Location	Overall				
Year	Location	Rank	1st place, gold medalist(s)	2nd place, silver medalist(s)	3rd place, bronze medalist(s)	Total
1997	Greece, Patras	6	1	1	2	4
2001	Spain, Pamplona	9	0	4	4	8
2003	Greece, Heraklion	3rd place, bronze medalist(s)	3	3	5	11
2005	Azerbaijan, Baku	2nd place, silver medalist(s)	4	4	5	13
2007	Azerbaijan, Baku	7	1	3	5	9
2009	Sweden, Trelleborg	1st place, gold medalist(s)	7	2	1	10
2011	Cyprus, Paphos	2nd place, silver medalist(s)	3	0	7	10
2013	Portugal, Porto	2nd place, silver medalist(s)	3	2	5	10
2015	Latvia, Daugavpils					
2017	Cyprus, Larnaca					
2019	Spain, Marina d'Or					
Total		1st place, gold medalist(s)	49	35	53	137

== Champion taekwondo practitioners ==
Male

- Servet Tazegül (born 1988), Olympics (2012), World (2011, 2015), European (2008, 2010, 2012, 2014, 2016)
- Bahri Tanrıkulu (born 1980), Olympic medalist, World (2001, 2007, 2009), European (2000, 2002)
- Hakan Reçber (born 1999), Olympic medalist, World (2023), European (2021, 2022)
- Yılmaz Helvacıoğlu (born 1961), World (1983)
- Cihat Kutluca (born 1971), World (1995)
- Rıdvan Baygut (born 1985), European (2008, 2010)
- Metin Şahin (born 1963), European (1986, 1990)
- Mert Tuncer (born 1975), European (1998, 2002)
- Bekir Aydın (born 1975), European (2000, 2002)
- Ertan Baştuğ (born 1976), European (2002, 2004)
- Murat Gollo, European (1976)
- Halit Avcı, European (1984)
- Nusret Ramazanoğlu (born 1965), European (1988)
- Osman Şener Özsoy (born 1965), European (1988)
- Harun Ateş (born 1968), European (1988)
- Ali Şahin (born 1967), European (1990)
- Sedat Bekdemir (born 1973), European (1998)
- Köksal Durusoy (born 1981), European (2005)
- Kıvanç Dinçsalman (born 1983), European (2005)
- Yunus Sarı (born 1991), European (2013)
- Emre Kutalmış Ateşli (born 2001), European (2022)
- Enbiya Taha Biçer (born 2001), European (2024)
- Furkan Ubeyde Çamoğlu (born 2005), European (2024)

Female

- Nur Tatar (born 1992), twice Olympic medalist, World (2017), European (2012)
- Hamide Bıkçın (born 1978), Olympic medalist, World (1995), European (2000)
- Nafia Kuş (born 1995), Olympic medalist, World (2023), European (2018)
- Azize Tanrıkulu (born 1986), Olympic medalist, European (2005)
- Hatice Kübra İlgün (born 1993), Olympic medalist, European (2022)
- İrem Yaman (born 1995), World (2015, 2019), European (2016, 2018)
- Tennur Yerlisu (born 1966), World (1987), European (1982, 1984)
- Zeliha Ağrıs (born 1998), World (2017), European (2022)
- Merve Dinçel (born 1999), World (2023), European (2022)
- Arzu Tan (born 1973), World (1991)
- Kadriye Selimoğlu (born 1978), World (2001)
- Züleyha Tan (born 1968), European (1986, 1988)
- Ayşenur Taşbakan (born 1982), European (2000, 2002)
- Sibel Güler (born 1984), European (2004, 2006)
- Hatice Kübra Yangın (born 1989), European (2008, 2012)
- Rukiye Yıldırım (born 1991), European (2010, 2018)
- Nurten Yalçınkaya, European (1982)
- Necla Demirel, European (1986)
- Sultan Demir, European (1988)
- Sibel Dinçer, European (1988)
- Nuray Deliktaş (born 1971), European (1992)
- Tuğgen Gedik, European (1994)
- Gülnur Yerlisu (born 1969), European (1992)
- Arzu Ceylan, European (1990)
- Serpil Gür, European (1990)
- Ziyada Boztepe, European (1990)
- Döndü Güvenç (born 1978), European (2002)
- Zeynep Murat (born 1983), European (2004)

== International competitions hosted ==
- 1988 European Taekwondo Championships - May 26–29, Ankara
- 1998 World Junior Taekwondo Championships - September 9–13, Istanbul
- 2002 European Taekwondo Championships - May 6–10, Samsun
- Taekwondo at the 2005 Summer Universiade - 15-19 August, İzmir
- 2007 European Poomse Championships - December 8–9, Antalya
- 2008 European Taekwondo Team Championships - November 1–2, Konya
- 2008 World Junior Taekwondo Championships - May 8–11, İzmir
- Taekwondo at the 2013 Mediterranean Games - 21-23 June, Mersin
- 2016 European Taekwondo Olympic Qualification Tournament - 16–17 January, Istanbul
- Taekwondo at the 2017 Summer Deaflympics - 27–30 July, Samsun
- Taekwondo at the 2021 Islamic Solidarity Games - 9–12 August, Konya
- 2021 European Para Taekwondo Championships - 23 September, Istanbul
