= 2010 World Cup Taekwondo Team Championships =

Taekwondo competition

2010 Taekwondo World Cup
- Venue: Xinjiang Sports Center
- Location: Urumqi, China
- Dates: 17–20 July 2010

Champions
- Men: Iran
- Women: South Korea

The 2010 World Cup Taekwondo Team Championships is the 3rd edition of the World Cup Taekwondo Team Championships, and was held at Xinjiang Sports Center in Urumqi, China from July 17 to July 20, 2010.

The participating male and female teams were divided into five groups each and the top four countries from the previous championship and the host country are seeded. Top five teams and three best-record teams among the second-placed teams in the men's and women's division of the preliminary round advanced to the quarterfinal round. The quarterfinal, semifinal and final matches were conducted in a single elimination format.

== Medalists ==
Event	Gold	Silver	Bronze
Men	Iran; Farzad Abdollahi; Yasin Akbarnattaj; Meisam Bagheri; Mohammad Bagheri Motamed; Yousef Karami; Alireza Nasr Azadani; Kourosh Rajoli; Hossein Tajik	Spain; Joel González; Eric García; Jon García; Nicolás García; Cesar Mari	Turkey; İsmail Akkuş; Selçuk Aydın; Rıdvan Baygut; Fırat Pozan; Yunus Sarı; Servet Tazegül; Serdar Yüksel
Men	Iran; Farzad Abdollahi; Yasin Akbarnattaj; Meisam Bagheri; Mohammad Bagheri Motamed; Yousef Karami; Alireza Nasr Azadani; Kourosh Rajoli; Hossein Tajik	Spain; Joel González; Eric García; Jon García; Nicolás García; Cesar Mari	South Korea; An Won; Lee Dong-eon; Park Kyeong-hoon; Song Moon-chul
Women	South Korea; An Sae-bom; Hong So-ra; Hwang Kyung-seon; Wang Hae-ree	China; Dong Mei; Fei Lulu; Guo Yunfei; Hou Yuzhuo; Lei Jie; Wu Jingyu; Zhang Hua; Zhang Qiang	Thailand; Rangsiya Nisaisom; Rapatkorn Prasopsuk; Dhunyanun Premwaew; Chanatip Sonkham
Women	South Korea; An Sae-bom; Hong So-ra; Hwang Kyung-seon; Wang Hae-ree	China; Dong Mei; Fei Lulu; Guo Yunfei; Hou Yuzhuo; Lei Jie; Wu Jingyu; Zhang Hua; Zhang Qiang	Turkey; Furkan Asena Aydın; Sevde Mavi; Nur Tatar; Özlem Ulaş; Hatice Kübra Yangın; Rukiye Yıldırım

== Men ==
=== Preliminary round ===
==== Group A ====
Pos	Team	Pld	W	D	L	MF	MA	Pts	KOR	UZB	MEX	SEN
1	South Korea	3	3	0	0	11	1	9	—	3–1	4–0	4–0
2	Uzbekistan	3	2	0	1	7	5	6	1–3	—	3–1	3–1
3	Mexico	3	1	0	2	4	8	3	0–4	1–3	—	3–1
4	Senegal	3	0	0	3	2	10	0	0–4	1–3	1–3	—

Source: WT

==== Group B ====
Pos	Team	Pld	W	D	L	MF	MA	Pts	IRI	RUS	JOR	KAZ
1	Iran	3	3	0	0	12	0	9	—	4–0	4–0	4–0
2	Russia	3	2	0	1	7	5	6	0–4	—	3–1	4–0
3	Jordan	3	0	1	2	3	9	1	0–4	1–3	—	2–2
4	Kazakhstan	3	0	1	2	2	10	1	0–4	0–4	2–2	—

Source: WT

==== Group C ====
Pos	Team	Pld	W	D	L	MF	MA	Pts	ESP	TPE	AUS	DEN
1	Spain	3	3	0	0	9	3	9	—	3–1	3–1	3–1
2	Chinese Taipei	3	2	0	1	7	5	6	1–3	—	3–1	3–1
3	Australia	3	1	0	2	5	7	3	1–3	1–3	—	3–1
4	Denmark	3	0	0	3	3	9	0	1–3	1–3	1–3	—

Source: WT

==== Group D ====
Pos	Team	Pld	W	D	L	MF	MA	Pts	TUR	GBR	EGY
1	Turkey	2	2	0	0	7	1	6	—	3–1	4–0
2	Great Britain	2	0	1	1	3	5	1	1–3	—	2–2
3	Egypt	2	0	1	1	2	6	1	0–4	2–2	—

Source: WT

==== Group E ====
Pos	Team	Pld	W	D	L	MF	MA	Pts	USA	CHN	AZE	THA
1	United States	3	2	1	0	8	4	7	—	2–2	3–1	3–1
2	China	3	2	1	0	8	4	7	2–2	—	3–1	3–1
3	Azerbaijan	3	1	0	2	6	6	3	1–3	1–3	—	4–0
4	Thailand	3	0	0	3	2	10	0	1–3	1–3	0–4	—

Source: WT

=== Knockout round ===
Quarterfinals		Semifinals		Final
Iran	3
Russia	1	Iran	3
United States	1	Turkey	1
Turkey	3			Iran	3
Spain	3			Spain	1
China	1	Spain	3
Chinese Taipei	1	South Korea	2
South Korea	3

Weight	Final		
	Iran	3–1	Spain
−80 kg	Farzad Abdollahi	7–5	Nicolás García
−68 kg	Mohammad Bagheri Motamed	4–1	Cesar Mari
−58 kg	Meisam Bagheri	2–10	Joel González
+80 kg	Hossein Tajik	8–3	Jon García

== Women ==
=== Preliminary round ===
==== Group A ====
Pos	Team	Pld	W	D	L	MF	MA	Pts	KOR	MEX	KAZ	AUS
1	South Korea	3	3	0	0	11	1	9	—	4–0	3–1	4–0
2	Mexico	3	2	0	1	7	5	6	0–4	—	3–1	4–0
3	Kazakhstan	3	1	0	2	5	7	3	1–3	1–3	—	3–1
4	Australia	3	0	0	3	1	11	0	0–4	0–4	1–3	—

Source: WT

==== Group B ====
Pos	Team	Pld	W	D	L	MF	MA	Pts	THA	ESP	UZB	GBR
1	Thailand	3	2	1	0	9	3	7	—	4–0	3–1	2–2
2	Spain	3	1	1	1	5	7	4	0–4	—	3–1	2–2
3	Uzbekistan	3	1	0	2	5	7	3	1–3	1–3	—	3–1
4	Great Britain	3	0	2	1	5	7	2	2–2	2–2	1–3	—

Source: WT

==== Group C ====
Pos	Team	Pld	W	D	L	MF	MA	Pts	TUR	FRA	JOR	SEN
1	Turkey	3	3	0	0	10	2	9	—	3–1	3–1	4–0
2	France	3	2	0	1	9	3	6	1–3	—	4–0	4–0
3	Jordan	3	1	0	2	4	8	3	1–3	0–4	—	3–1
4	Senegal	3	0	0	3	1	11	0	0–4	0–4	1–3	—

Source: WT

==== Group D ====
Pos	Team	Pld	W	D	L	MF	MA	Pts	RUS	USA	MAR	VIE
1	Russia	3	2	1	0	9	3	7	—	3–1	2–2	4–0
2	United States	3	2	0	1	8	4	6	1–3	—	3–1	4–0
3	Morocco	3	1	1	1	7	5	4	2–2	1–3	—	4–0
4	Vietnam	3	0	0	3	0	12	0	0–4	0–4	0–4	—

Source: WT

==== Group E ====
Pos	Team	Pld	W	D	L	MF	MA	Pts	CHN	TPE	IRI	TUN
1	China	3	2	1	0	9	3	7	—	2–2	3–1	4–0
2	Chinese Taipei	3	1	2	0	7	5	5	2–2	—	2–2	3–1
3	Iran	3	1	1	1	7	5	4	1–3	2–2	—	4–0
4	Tunisia	3	0	0	3	1	11	0	0–4	1–3	0–4	—

Source: WT

=== Knockout round ===
Quarterfinals		Semifinals		Final
South Korea	3
Mexico	1	South Korea	3
Russia	1	Thailand	1
Thailand	3			South Korea	3
China	3			China	2
France	1	China	3
United States	0	Turkey	2
Turkey	4

Weight	Final		
	South Korea	3–2	China
−57 kg	Wang Hae-ree	0–3	Lei Jie
−49 kg	Hong So-ra	5–9	Wu Jingyu
−67 kg	Hwang Kyung-seon	4–0	Guo Yunfei
+67 kg	An Sae-bom	6–5	Fei Lulu
−57 kg	Wang Hae-ree	1–0	Lei Jie
