= Milliyet Sports Awards =

Turkish sports awards

The Milliyet Sports Awards (Turkish: Milliyet Spor Ödülleri) are given by the Turkish daily Milliyet annually since 1954 in recognition of highest achievements in sports. The award is determined by a poll of Turkish professional footballers playing, athletes, teams, managers in Turkey and World. From 1954 until 2004, there was only one award "Turkish Athlete of the Year" or "Team of the Year".

== Award ==
=== Athlete of the Year ===
No	Year	Athlete / team	Branch	Info
1.	1954	(Turkey) Murat Güler	Swimming	
2.	1955	(Turkey) Lefter Küçükandonyadis	Football	
3.	1956	(Turkey) Hamit Kaplan	Wrestling	
4.	1957	(Turkey) Mustafa Dağıstanlı	Wrestling	
5.	1958	(Turkey) Varol Ürkmez	Football	
6.	1959	(Turkey) Nazmi Bilge	Football	
7.	1960	(Turkey) Mithat Bayrak	Wrestling	
8.	1961	(Turkey) Yücel Cavkaytar	Archery	
9.	1962	(Turkey) Metin Oktay	Football	
10.	1963	(Turkey) Muharrem Dalkılıç	Track and Field	
11.	1964	(Turkey) Kazım Ayvaz	Wrestling	
12.	1965	(Turkey) Kemal Öncü	Equestrianism	
13.	1966	(Turkey) Turgay Şeren	Football	
14.	1967	(Turkey) Ahmet Ayık	Wrestling	
15.	1968	(Turkey) İsmail Akçay	Track and Field	
16.	1969	(Turkey) Necdet Yıldırım	Football	
17.	1970	(Turkey) Ali Rıza Alan	Wrestling	
18.	1971	(Turkey) Özden Ezinler	Fencing	
19.	1972	(Turkey) Cemal Kamacı	Boxing	
20.	1973	(Turkey) Yasin Özdenak	Football	
21.	1974	(Turkey) Ersin Aydın	Swimming	
22.	1975	(Turkey) Cemal Kamacı	Boxing	
23.	1976	(Turkey) Veli Ballı	Track and Field	
24.	1977	(Turkey) Cemil Turan	Football	
25.	1978	(Turkey) Ekrem Özdamar	Track and Field	
26.	1979	(Turkey) Şenol Güneş	Football	
27.	1980	(Turkey) Eczacıbaşı SK Woman Volleyball Team	Volleyball	
28.	1981	(Turkey) Efe Aydan	Basketball	
29.	1982	(Turkey) Salih Bora	Wrestling	
30.	1983	(Turkey) Yılmaz Helvacıoğlu	Taekwondo	
31.	1984	(Turkey) Eyüp Can	Boxing	
32.	1985	(Turkey) Galatasaray High School Basketball Team	Basketball	
33.	1986	(Turkey) Naim Süleymanoğlu	Weightlifting	
34.	1987	(Turkey) Naim Süleymanoğlu & Tennur Yerlisu	Weightlifting & Taekwondo	
35.	1988	(Turkey) Naim Süleymanoğlu & Tanju Çolak	Weightlifting & Football	
36.	1989	(Turkey) Rıdvan Dilmen	Football	
37.	1990	(Turkey) Arzu Ceylan	Taekwondo	
38.	1991	(Turkey) Derya Büyükuncu	Swimming	
39.	1992	(Turkey) Mehmet Akif Pirim	Wrestling	
40.	1993	(Turkey) Naim Süleymanoğlu	Weightlifting	
41.	1994	(Turkey) Naim Süleymanoğlu	Weightlifting	
42.	1995	Turkey national football team	Football	
43.	1996	(Turkey) Naim Süleymanoğlu	Weightlifting	
44.	1997	(Turkey) Hamza Yerlikaya	Wrestling	
45.	1998	(Turkey) Galatasaray S.K. (football team)	Football	
46.	1999	(Turkey) Halil Mutlu	Weightlifting	
47.	2000	(Turkey) Halil Mutlu	Weightlifting	
48.	2001	(Turkey) Halil Mutlu	Weightlifting	
49.	2002	(Turkey) Süreyya Ayhan	Track and field	
50.	2003	(Turkey) Süreyya Ayhan	Track and field	
51.	2004	(Turkey) Atagün Yalçınkaya	Boxing	
52.	2005	(Turkey) Hamza Yerlikaya	Wrestling	
53.	2006	(Turkey) Neslihan Darnel	Volleyball	
54.	2007	(Turkey) Kenan Sofuoğlu	Motorcycle Racer	
55.	2008	(Turkey) Elvan Abeylegesse	Track and field	
56.	2009	(Turkey) Bahri Tanrıkulu	Taekwondo	
57.	2010	(Turkey) Nevin Yanıt	Track and field	
58.	2011	(Turkey) Mete Binay	Weightlifting	
59.	2012	(Turkey) Aslı Çakır Alptekin	Track and field	
60.	2013	(Turkey) Arda Turan	Football	
61.	2014	(Turkey) Şahika Ercümen	Freediving	
62.	2015	(Turkey) Kenan Sofuoğlu	Motorcycle Racer	
63.	2016	(Turkey) Taha Akgül	Freestyle wrestling	
64.	2017	(Turkey) Ramil Guliyev	Track and field	
65.	2018	(Turkey) Ramil Guliyev	Track and field	
66.	2019	(Turkey) Rıza Kayaalp	Wrestling	
67.	2020	(Turkey) İbrahim Çolak	Artistic gymnastics	
68.	2021	(Turkey) Mete Gazoz	Archery	
69.	2022	(Turkey) Adem Asil	Artistic gymnastics	
70.	2023	(Turkey) Melissa Vargas	Volleyball	
71.	Award not given			
72.	2025	(Turkey) Alperen Şengün	Basketball	

=== Sport People of the Year ===
No.	Year	Executive of the Year	Job	Info
52.	2005	(Turkey) Aziz Yıldırım	Businessperson, President of Fenerbahçe SK	
53.	2006	(Turkey) Ahmet Ağaoğlu	Businessperson, Turkey Golf Federation Chairman	
54.	2007	(Turkey) Aziz Yıldırım	Businessperson, President of Fenerbahçe SK	
55.	2008	(Turkey) Adnan Polat	Businessperson, President of Galatasaray SK	
56.	2009	(Turkey) İbrahim Karaosmanoğlu	Politics, Mayors of Kocaeli	
57.	2010	(Turkey) Turgay Demirel	Commissioner of Turkish Basketball Federation	
58.	2011	(Turkey) Erol Ünal Karabıyık	President of Turkish Volleyball Federation	
59.	2012	(Turkey) Ünal Aysal	Businessperson, President of Galatasaray SK	
60.	2013	(Turkey) Demirhan Şerefhan	President of TBESF	
61.	2014	(Turkey) Cüneyt Çakır	Referee	
62.	2015	(Turkey) Fatih Terim	Head coach of Turkish national football team	
63.	2016	(Turkey) Fikret Orman	Businessperson, President of Beşiktaş JK	
64.	2017	(Turkey) Aziz Yıldırım	Businessperson, President of Fenerbahçe SK	

=== Manager of the Year ===
No.	Year	Manager of the Year	Team	Info
52.	2005	(Turkey) Abdullah Avcı	Turkey U-17 Football Team	
53.	2006	(Montenegro) Bogdan Tanjević	Turkey national basketball team	
54.	2007	(Turkey) Bülent Uygun	Sivasspor	
55.	2008	(Turkey) Fatih Terim	Turkey national football team	
56.	2009	(Turkey) Mustafa Denizli	Beşiktaş JK	
57.	2010	(Montenegro) Bogdan Tanjević	Turkey national basketball team	
58.	2011	(Turkey) Şahin Çatma	Turkey girls youth national volleyball team	
59.	2012	(Turkey) Fatih Terim	Galatasaray SK	
60.	2013	(Turkey) Fatih Terim	Galatasaray SK	
61.	2014	(Turkey) Ersun Yanal	Trabzonspor	
62.	2015	(Turkey) Hamza Hamzaoğlu	Galatasaray SK	
63.	2016	(Turkey) Şenol Güneş	Beşiktaş JK	
64.	2017	(Serbia) Željko Obradović	Fenerbahçe Men's Basketball	
65.	2018	(Serbia) Željko Obradović	Fenerbahçe Men's Basketball	
66.	2019	(Turkey) Şenol Güneş	Beşiktaş	
67.	2020	(Turkey) Ergin Ataman	Anadolu Efes	
68.	2021	(Italy) Giovanni Guidetti	Turkey women's national volleyball team	
69.	2022	(Turkey) Abdullah Avcı	Trabzonspor	
70.	2023	(Italy) Daniele Santarelli	Turkey women's national volleyball team	
71.	2024	Award not given		
72.	2025	(Lithuania) Šarūnas Jasikevičius	Fenerbahçe Men's Basketball	

=== Team of the Year ===
No.	Year	Team of the Year	Branch	Info
33.	1986	Küçükyalı 50th Academy Woman Volleyball Team	Volleyball	
34.	1987	Turkish National Military Volleyball Team	Volleyball	
35.	1988	Üsküdar Girls Academy Volleyball Team	Volleyball	
36.	1989	Galatasaray SK	Football	
37.	1990	Turkish National Taekwondo Team	Taekwondo	
38.	1991	Beşiktaş JK	Football	
39.	1992	Turkey national under-20 football team	Football	
40.	1993	Galatasaray SK	Football	
41.	1994	Trabzonspor	Football	
42.	1995	Beşiktaş JK	Football	
43.	1996	Anadolu Efes S.K.	Basketball	
44.	1997	Galatasaray SK	Football	
45.	1998	Turkey National Basketball Team	Basketball	
46.	1999	Galatasaray SK	Football	
47.	2000	Galatasaray SK	Football	
48.	2001	Anadolu Efes S.K.	Basketball	
49.	2002	no award		
50.	2003	Beşiktaş JK	Football	
51.	2004	Fenerbahçe SK	Football	
52.	2005	Turkey U-17 Football Team	Football	
53.	2006	Turkey National Basketball Team	Basketball	
54.	2007	Fenerbahçe SK	Football	
55.	2008	Turkey National Football Team	Football	
56.	2009	Beşiktaş JK	Football	
57.	2010	Turkey National Basketball Team	Basketball	
58.	2011	Turkey girls youth national volleyball team	Volleyball	
59.	2012	Galatasaray SK	Football	
60.	2013	Vakıfbank SK	Volleyball	
61.	2014	Galatasaray S.K. (women's basketball)	Basketball	
62.	2015	Turkey National Football Team	Football	
63.	2016	Beşiktaş JK	Football	
64.	2017	Fenerbahçe SK	Basketball	
65.	2018	Vakıfbank SK	Volleyball	
66.	2019	Turkey national football team	Football	
67.	2020	Turkey women's national volleyball team	Volleyball	
68.	2021	Turkey women's national volleyball team	Volleyball	
69.	2022	Anadolu Efes	Basketball	
70.	2023	Turkey women's national volleyball team	Volleyball	
71.	2024	Award not given		
72.	2025	Turkey women's national volleyball team	Volleyball	

=== Footballer of the Year ===
No.	Year	Footballer of the Year	Team	Info
1.	1954	Award not given		
2.	1955	(Turkey) Lefter Küçükandonyadis	(Turkey) Fenerbahçe	
3.-4.	1956-1957	Award not given		
5.	1958	(Turkey) Varol Ürkmez	(Turkey) Beşiktaş	
6.	1959	(Turkey) Nazmi Bilge	(Turkey) Beşiktaş	
7.-8.	1960-1961	Award not given		
9.	1962	(Turkey) Metin Oktay	(Turkey) Galatasaray	
10-12.	1963-1965	Award not given		
13.	1966	(Turkey) Turgay Şeren	(Turkey) Galatasaray	
14-15.	1967-1968	Award not given		
16.	1969	(Turkey) Necdet Yıldırım	(Turkey) Eskişehirspor	
17-19.	1970-1972	Award not given		
20.	1973	(Turkey) Yasin Özdenak	(Turkey) Galatasaray	
21-23.	1974-1976	Award not given		
24.	1977	(Turkey) Cemil Turan	(Turkey) Fenerbahçe	
25.	1978	Award not given		
26.	1979	(Turkey) Şenol Güneş	(Turkey) Trabzonspor	
27-31.	1980-1984	Award not given		
32.	1985	(Socialist Federal Republic of Yugoslavia) Zoran Simović	(Turkey) Galatasaray	
33.	1986	(Socialist Federal Republic of Yugoslavia) Zoran Simović	(Turkey) Galatasaray	
34.	1987	(Socialist Federal Republic of Yugoslavia) Zoran Simović	(Turkey) Galatasaray	
35.	1988	(Turkey) Tanju Çolak	(Turkey) Galatasaray	
35.	1988	(Germany) Harald Schumacher	(Turkey) Fenerbahçe	
36.	1989	(Turkey) Rıdvan Dilmen	(Turkey) Fenerbahçe	
36.	1989	(Germany) Harald Schumacher	(Turkey) Fenerbahçe	
37.	1990	(Germany) Detlef Müller	(Turkey) Sarıyer SK	
38.	1991	(Turkey) Mehmet Özdilek	(Turkey) Beşiktaş	
39.	1992	Award not given		
40.	1993	(Germany) Reinhard Stumpf	(Turkey) Galatasaray	
41.	1994	(Georgia (country)) Shota Arveladze	(Turkey) Trabzonspor	
42.	1995	Award not given		
43.	1996	(Turkey) Hakan Şükür	(Turkey) Galatasaray	
43.	1996	(Romania) Gheorghe Hagi	(Turkey) Galatasaray	
44.	1997	(Turkey) Hakan Şükür	(Turkey) Galatasaray	
44.	1997	(Nigeria) Uche Okechukwu	(Turkey) Fenerbahçe	
45.	1998	(Turkey) Hakan Şükür	(Turkey) Galatasaray	
45.	1998	(Bosnia and Herzegovina) Elvir Baljić	(Turkey) Fenerbahçe	
46.	1999	(Turkey) Hakan Şükür	(Turkey) Galatasaray	
46.	1999	(Romania) Gheorghe Hagi	(Turkey) Galatasaray	
47.	2000	(Turkey) Hakan Şükür	(Turkey) Galatasaray / (Italy) Inter Milan	
47.	2000	(Romania) Gheorghe Hagi	(Turkey) Galatasaray	
48.	2001	(Turkey) Rüştü Reçber	(Turkey) Fenerbahçe	
49.	2002	(Turkey) Nihat Kahveci	(Spain) Real Sociedad	
50.	2003	(Turkey) Sergen Yalçın	(Turkey) Beşiktaş	
51.	2004	(Netherlands) Pierre van Hooijdonk	(Turkey) Fenerbahçe	
52.	2005	(Brazil) Alex De Souza	(Turkey) Fenerbahçe	
53.	2006	(Turkey) Tugay Kerimoğlu	(England) Blackburn Rovers	
54.	2007	(Turkey) Mehmet Aurélio	(Turkey) Fenerbahçe	
55.	2008	(Turkey) Arda Turan	(Turkey) Galatasaray	
56.	2009	(Turkey) Arda Turan	(Turkey) Galatasaray	
57.	2010	(Brazil) Alex De Souza	(Turkey) Fenerbahçe	
58.	2011	Award not given		
59.	2012	(Turkey) Selçuk İnan	(Turkey) Galatasaray	
60.	2013	(Ivory Coast) Didier Drogba	(Turkey) Galatasaray	
61.	2014	(Turkey) Arda Turan	(Spain) Atlético Madrid	
62.	2015	(Turkey) Arda Turan	(Spain) Barcelona	
63.	2016	(Uruguay) Fernando Muslera	(Turkey) Galatasaray	
64.	2017	(Turkey) Cenk Tosun	(Turkey) Beşiktaş	
65.	2018	(Turkey) Cengiz Ünder	(Italy) Roma	
66.	2019	(Turkey) Çağlar Söyüncü	(England) Leicester City	
67.	2020	(Turkey) İrfan Can Kahveci	(Turkey) İstanbul Başakşehir	
68.	2021	(Turkey) Hakan Çalhanoğlu	(Italy) AC Milan / (Italy) Inter Milan	
69.	2022	(Turkey) Enes Ünal	(Spain) Getafe	
70.	2023	(Argentina) Mauro Icardi	(Turkey) Galatasaray	
71.	2024	Award not given		
72.	2025	(Nigeria) Victor Osimhen	(Turkey) Galatasaray	

==== By player ====
Rank	Player	wins
1	Hakan Şükür	5
2	Arda Turan	4
3	Gheorghe Hagi	3
3	Zoran Simović	3
4	Alex De Souza	2
4	Harald Schumacher	2

==== By club ====
Rank	Club	Wins
1	Galatasaray	23
2	Fenerbahçe	12
3	Beşiktaş	5
4	Trabzonspor	2
5	Eskişehirspor	1
5	Sarıyer	1
5	Real Sociedad	1
5	Blackburn Rovers	1
5	Atlético Madrid	1
5	Barcelona	1
5	Roma	1
5	Leicester City	1
5	Inter Milan	1
5	Getafe	1
5	İstanbul Başakşehir	1

==== By country ====
Rank	Country	Wins
1	Turkey	29
2	Germany	4
3	Yugoslavia	3
3	Romania	3
4	Brazil	2
4	Nigeria	2
5	Argentina	1
5	Georgia	1
5	Bosnia and Herzegovina	1
5	Netherlands	1
5	Ivory Coast	1
5	Uruguay	1

=== Newcomer of the Year ===
No.	Year	Team of the Year	Branch	Ref
71.	2024	Award not given		
72.	2025	Zeynep Sönmez	Tennis	
