= Taekwondo in Turkey =

- Country: Turkey
- Governing body: Turkey Taekwondo Federation
- National team: Turkey Olympics team

International competitions
- European Taekwondo Championships; World Taekwondo Championships; Summer Olympics

Taekwondo is the most popular sport after football and chess in Turkey, practiced by more than 400,000 licensed participants.

Taekwondo was introduced in Turkey in the 1960s. It was officially recognized under the Turkey Judo Federation in 1968. The first international participation of Turkish taekwondo practitioners took place at the 1st European Taekwondo Championships in 1976. The Turkish team placed the second rank at that championships.

With the establishment of the Turkey Taekwondo Federation in 1981, the sport gained independent status from judo. The number of Taekwondo medalists rank at top in Turkey.
