= 2009 World Taekwondo Championships – Women's lightweight =

Taekwondo competition

Women's lightweight at the 2009 World Championships
- Venue: Ballerup Super Arena
- Dates: 18 October 2009
- Competitors: 48 from 48 nations

Medalists
gold medal	Lim Su-jeong	South Korea
silver medal	Zhang Hua	China
bronze medal	Estefanía Hernández	Spain
bronze medal	Chonnapas Premwaew	Thailand

The Women's lightweight is a competition featured at the 2011 World Taekwondo Championships, and was held at the Ballerup Super Arena in Copenhagen, Denmark on October 18. Lightweights were limited to a maximum of 62 kilograms in body mass.

== Results ==
Legend

- DQ — Won by disqualification

=== Finals ===
Semifinals		Final
Lim Su-jeong (KOR)	9
Estefanía Hernández (ESP)	5	Lim Su-jeong (KOR)	10
Zhang Hua (CHN)	2	Zhang Hua (CHN)	8
Chonnapas Premwaew (THA)	1

=== Top half ===
==== Section 1 ====
Round of 64
Nacera Chemmam (ALG)	0
Yulia Akimova (RUS)	2
Irene Osula (NGR)	4
Špela Šinkovec (SLO)	13
Zuleika Colón (PUR)	DQ
~~Shaden Thweib (JOR)~~
Criselda Roxas (PHI)	6
Venera Abdurazakova (UZB)	3

Round of 32
Lim Su-jeong (KOR)	6
Yulia Akimova (RUS)	0
Špela Šinkovec (SLO)	0
Margarita Michailidou (GRE)	4
~~Marie Ngo Ebem (CMR)~~
Zuleika Colón (PUR)	DQ
Criselda Roxas (PHI)	5
Chang Chueh (TPE)	9

Round of 16
Lim Su-jeong (KOR)	6
Margarita Michailidou (GRE)	2
Zuleika Colón (PUR)	1
Chang Chueh (TPE)	17

Quarterfinals
Lim Su-jeong (KOR)	11
Chang Chueh (TPE)	1

==== Section 2 ====
Round of 64
Natali Goez (COL)	DQ
~~Srishti Singh (IND)~~
Raha Dewi Neta (INA)	0
Stephanie Beckel (USA)	1
Tamara Gorjup (SRB)	0
Adanys Cordero (VEN)	5
~~Takhmina Khojaeva (TJK)~~
Petra Matijašević (CRO)	DQ

Round of 32
Carole Toh (CIV)	9
Natali Goez (COL)	8
Stephanie Beckel (USA)	14
Yekaterina Dmitriyeva (KAZ)	11
Michelle Sole (DEN)	1
Adanys Cordero (VEN)	9
Petra Matijašević (CRO)	2
Estefanía Hernández (ESP)	4

Round of 16
Carole Toh (CIV)	7
Stephanie Beckel (USA)	6
Adanys Cordero (VEN)	3
Estefanía Hernández (ESP)	4

Quarterfinals
Carole Toh (CIV)	1
Estefanía Hernández (ESP)	3

=== Bottom half ===
==== Section 3 ====
Round of 64
Carolina Acosta (MEX)	3
Nina Kläy (SUI)	0
Zhang Hua (CHN)	2
Joyce van Baaren (AHO)	1
Margherita Zocco (ITA)	6
Maryia Miahkova (BLR)	5
Elzana Karahodžić (BIH)	6
Cynthia Dotsey (GHA)	2

Round of 32
Naima Bakkal (MAR)	1
Carolina Acosta (MEX)	3
Zhang Hua (CHN)	11
Katerina Artemiou (CYP)	0
Débora Nunes (BRA)	6
Margherita Zocco (ITA)	7
Elzana Karahodžić (BIH)	0
Marlène Harnois (FRA)	4

Round of 16
Carolina Acosta (MEX)	1
Zhang Hua (CHN)	4
Margherita Zocco (ITA)	6
Marlène Harnois (FRA)	11

Quarterfinals
Zhang Hua (CHN)	7
Marlène Harnois (FRA)	3

==== Section 4 ====
Round of 64
~~Nghiêm Thị Huyền (VIE)~~
Sibel Sağır (TUR)	DQ
Lenka Moravcová (CZE)	3
Julia Swietkowiak (GER)	4
~~Kadiatou Camara (GUI)~~
Mona Solheim (NOR)	DQ
Elin Johansson (SWE)	5
Olga Cherkun (UKR)	1

Round of 32
Chonnapas Premwaew (THA)	9
Sibel Sağır (TUR)	2
Julia Swietkowiak (GER)	0
Carmen Marton (AUS)	1
Mária Gál (HUN)	10
Mona Solheim (NOR)	11
Elin Johansson (SWE)	3
Karine Sergerie (CAN)	3

Round of 16
Chonnapas Premwaew (THA)	7
Carmen Marton (AUS)	3
Mona Solheim (NOR)	0
Karine Sergerie (CAN)	5

Quarterfinals
Chonnapas Premwaew (THA)	6
Karine Sergerie (CAN)	4
