= 2015 World Cup Taekwondo Team Championships =

Taekwondo competition

2015 Taekwondo World Cup
- Venue: Gimnasio Olímpico Juan de la Barrera
- Location: Mexico City, Mexico
- Dates: 8–9 December 2015

Champions
- Men: Azerbaijan
- Women: China

The 2015 World Cup Taekwondo Team Championships was the 7th edition of the World Cup Taekwondo Team Championships, and was held in Mexico City, Mexico from December 8 to December 9, 2014.

Teams were allowed to augment their squads with maximum two athletes from other countries.

== Medalists ==
Event	Gold	Silver	Bronze
Men	Azerbaijan; Sina Bahrami; Milad Beigi; Said Guliyev; Radik Isayev; Mahammad Mammadov; Aykhan Taghizade	Iran; Omid Amidi; Armin Hadipour; Masoud Hajji-Zavareh; Mohammad Kazemi; Saeid Rajabi; Abolfazl Yaghoubi	South Korea; Jeong In-chang; Kim Hun; Lee Dae-hoon; Lee Seon-kyu; Park Hyeon-jun; Wi Su-bong
Men	Azerbaijan; Sina Bahrami; Milad Beigi; Said Guliyev; Radik Isayev; Mahammad Mammadov; Aykhan Taghizade	Iran; Omid Amidi; Armin Hadipour; Masoud Hajji-Zavareh; Mohammad Kazemi; Saeid Rajabi; Abolfazl Yaghoubi	Russia; Bolat Izutdinov; Maksim Khramtsov; Anton Kotkov; Vladislav Larin; Konstantin Minin; Said Ustaev
Women	China; Guo Yunfei; Li Zhaoyi; Shao Fenfen; Wu Jingyu; Zhang Hua; Zheng Shuyin	Mexico; Paulina Armería; Katherine Dumar; María Espinoza; Anel Félix; Itzel Manjarrez; Haby Niaré	Chinese Taipei; Chen Yu-chuang; Cheng Chiao-hsin; Chuang Chia-chia; Huang Yun-wen; Lin Chieh-erh; Yeh Li-hsuan
Women	China; Guo Yunfei; Li Zhaoyi; Shao Fenfen; Wu Jingyu; Zhang Hua; Zheng Shuyin	Mexico; Paulina Armería; Katherine Dumar; María Espinoza; Anel Félix; Itzel Manjarrez; Haby Niaré	South Korea; Han Ji-hye; Kim Bich-na; Kim So-hui; Lee Ah-reum; Oh Hye-ri; Seo So-young

- Foreign athletes are shown in italic.

== Men ==
=== Preliminary round ===
==== Group A ====
Pos	Team	Pld	W	D	L	PF	PA	PD	Pts	AZE	IRI	UZB	BEL
1	Azerbaijan	3	2	0	1	110	73	+37	6	—	22–31	31–11	57–31
2	Iran	3	2	0	1	96	77	+19	6	31–22	—	25–26	40–29
3	Uzbekistan	3	2	0	1	57	68	−11	6	11–31	26–25	—	20–12
4	Belgium	3	0	0	3	72	117	−45	0	31–57	29–40	12–20	—

Source: WT

==== Group B ====
Pos	Team	Pld	W	D	L	PF	PA	PD	Pts	RUS	KOR	MEX	USA
1	Russia	3	3	0	0	110	59	+51	9	—	30–22	44–25	36–12
2	South Korea	3	2	0	1	79	83	−4	6	22–30	—	PUN	26–8
3	Mexico	3	1	0	2	102	87	+15	3	25–44	45–31	—	32–12
4	United States	3	0	0	3	32	94	−62	0	12–36	8–26	12–32	—

Source: WT

=== Knockout round ===
Semifinals		Final
Azerbaijan	48
South Korea	30	Azerbaijan	42
Russia	24	Iran	23
Iran	31

== Women ==
=== Preliminary round ===
==== Group A ====
Pos	Team	Pld	W	D	L	PF	PA	PD	Pts	CHN	KOR	RUS	USA
1	China	3	3	0	0	73	43	+30	9	—	26–21	22–12	25–10
2	South Korea	3	2	0	1	72	54	+18	6	21–26	—	16–9	35–19
3	Russia	3	1	0	2	51	57	−6	3	12–22	9–16	—	30–19
4	United States	3	0	0	3	48	90	−42	0	10–25	19–35	19–30	—

Source: WT

==== Group B ====
Pos	Team	Pld	W	D	L	PF	PA	PD	Pts	MEX	TPE	CIV
1	Mexico	2	2	0	0	36	24	+12	6	—	12–11	24–13
2	Chinese Taipei	2	1	0	1	38	28	+10	3	11–12	—	27–16
3	Ivory Coast	2	0	0	2	29	51	−22	0	13–24	16–27	—

Source: WT

=== Knockout round ===
Semifinals		Final
China	32
Chinese Taipei	14	China	34
Mexico	25	Mexico	32
South Korea	17
