= 2017 Jeux de la Francophonie =

International sports competition in Abidjan, Ivory Coast

VIIIèmes Jeux de la Francophonie
- Host city: Abidjan, Ivory Coast
- Nations: 49
- Athletes: 4,000
- Opening: July 21, 2017
- Closing: July 30, 2017
- Opened by: Alassane Ouattara
- Main venue: Stade Félix Houphouet-Boigny

The 2017 Jeux de la Francophonie, also known as VIIIèmes Jeux de la Francophonie (French for 8th Francophone Games), informally known as Abidjan 2017, took place in Abidjan, Ivory Coast, from July 21–30. This was the first edition of the games to be hosted in Ivory Coast.

Since 2011, it was the third international competition held in Abidjan, after the 2013 World Cup Taekwondo Team Championships and the 2013 AfroBasket.

== Venues ==
Ten cultural and sports venues will be situated in three geographic zones in Abidjan :

- Zone A : Marcory and Treichville suburbs
- Zone B : Plateau suburb
- Zone C : Cocody suburb

=== Zone A (Marcory and Treichville) ===
- Stade Robert Champroux - Sporting competitions, Renovated in 2007
- Parc du Canal aux bois - Cultural events
- Palais des Sports de Treichville - Sporting competitions, Renovated in 2013
- Palace of Culture of Abidjan - Cultural events, Renovated in 2012
- Café-Théâtre, Centre national des arts et de la culture - Cultural events

=== Zone B (Le Plateau) ===
- Stade Félix Houphouët-Boigny - Sporting competitions, To be renovated
- Ivory Coast Museum of Civilisations - Cultural events
- National Library of Ivory Coast - Cultural events
- French Cultural Centre - Cultural events

=== Zone C (Cocody) ===
- Université Félix Houphouët-Boigny (campus) - Games village; Sporting competitions, Renovated in 2012

== Participants ==
Of the 48 delegations participating, Kosovo and Ukraine were participating for the first time, while Laos returned to the Games for the first time since 2009. Countries that participated in 2013 that did not return in 2017 were Andorra, Austria, Cyprus, Equatorial Guinea, Estonia, Guinea-Bissau, Montenegro, Poland, Rwanda, Saint Lucia, and Slovakia.

- Armenia
- Benin
- Bulgaria
- Burkina Faso
- Burundi
- Cambodia
- Cameroon
- Canada
  - New Brunswick
  - Quebec
- Cape Verde
- Central African Republic
- Chad
- Comoros
- Congo
- Democratic Republic of the Congo
- Djibouti
- Egypt
- France
- French Community of Belgium
- Gabon
- Guinea
- Haiti
- Ivory Coast
- Kosovo
- Laos
- Lebanon
- Luxembourg
- Macedonia
- Madagascar
- Mali
- Mauritania
- Mauritius
- Monaco
- Morocco
- Mozambique
- Niger
- Qatar
- Romania
- Senegal
- Seychelles
- Switzerland
- Togo
- Tunisia
- Ukraine
- Uruguay
- Vanuatu
- Vietnam

== Events ==
=== Sports ===
- African wrestling (12)
- Athletics (42)
- Athletics (handicapped) (5)
- Basketball (1)
- Cycling (2)
- Football (soccer) (1)
- Judo (14)
- Table tennis (4)
- Wrestling (16)

=== Cultural ===
- Digital creation
- Ecological creation
- Hip-hop dance
- Juggling
- Poetry
- Painting
- Photography
- Puppetry
- Sculpture
- Song
- Storytelling
- Traditional inspiration dance

== Medal table ==
Final medal tally below.

* Host nation (Ivory Coast)

| Rank | Nation | Gold | Silver | Bronze | Total |
|---|---|---|---|---|---|
| 1 | France | 22 | 16 | 11 | 49 |
| 2 | Morocco | 13 | 14 | 15 | 42 |
| 3 | Canada | 13 | 8 | 15 | 36 |
| 4 | Senegal | 10 | 9 | 8 | 27 |
| 5 | Romania | 8 | 9 | 14 | 31 |
| 6 | Ivory Coast* | 6 | 8 | 5 | 19 |
| 7 | Cameroon | 5 | 7 | 9 | 21 |
| 8 | Quebec | 5 | 7 | 6 | 18 |
| 9 | Congo | 5 | 0 | 0 | 5 |
| 10 | Burkina Faso | 3 | 4 | 2 | 9 |
| 11 | Switzerland | 3 | 2 | 9 | 14 |
| 12 | Seychelles | 2 | 0 | 1 | 3 |
| 13 | Kosovo | 2 | 0 | 0 | 2 |
| 14 | Armenia | 1 | 4 | 3 | 8 |
| 15 | Mali | 1 | 2 | 5 | 8 |
| 16 | Niger | 1 | 2 | 3 | 6 |
| 17 | New Brunswick | 1 | 2 | 2 | 5 |
| 18 | Benin | 1 | 1 | 3 | 5 |
| 18 | Mauritius | 1 | 1 | 3 | 5 |
| 20 | Cape Verde | 1 | 1 | 0 | 2 |
| 21 | Tunisia | 1 | 0 | 6 | 7 |
| 22 | DR Congo | 1 | 0 | 2 | 3 |
| 22 | Lebanon | 1 | 0 | 2 | 3 |
| 24 | Egypt | 1 | 0 | 0 | 1 |
| 25 | (Wallonia) French Community of Belgium | 0 | 2 | 2 | 4 |
| 26 | Chad | 0 | 2 | 1 | 3 |
| 27 | Gabon | 0 | 2 | 0 | 2 |
| 27 | Guinea | 0 | 2 | 0 | 2 |
| 29 | Luxembourg | 0 | 1 | 3 | 4 |
| 30 | Madagascar | 0 | 1 | 2 | 3 |
| 31 | Central African Republic | 0 | 0 | 2 | 2 |
| 32 | Cambodia | 0 | 0 | 1 | 1 |
| 32 | Djibouti | 0 | 0 | 1 | 1 |
| 32 | Togo | 0 | 0 | 1 | 1 |
| 32 | Vietnam | 0 | 0 | 1 | 1 |
| Totals (35 entries) | | 108 | 107 | 138 | 353 |

== Medalists ==
=== African wrestling ===
| Event | Gold | Silver | Bronze |
|---|---|---|---|
| Men's team | Senegal; Mouhamet Bousso; Omar Diouane; Moussa Faye; Cheikh Tidiane Niang; Moustapha Sène | Burkina Faso; Débé Blaise; Emmanuel Romaric Kawané; Moussa Konané; Eloi Zerbo; Drissa Zon | Niger; Mahamadou Alimiyaou; Garba Mourtala; Tassiou Sani; Tassiou Ibrahim; Yahaya Kaka |
| Men's 66 kg | Moussa Faye; Senegal | Roland Tambi Nforsong; Cameroon | Mahamadou Alimiyaou; Niger |
| Men's 76 kg | Madalin Minzala; Romania | Garba Mourtala; Niger | Omar Diouane; Senegal |
| Men's 86 kg | Cheikh Tidiane Niang; Senegal | Drissa Zon; Burkina Faso | Tassiou Ibrahim; Niger |
| Men's 100 kg | Moustapha Sène; Senegal | Yahaya Kaka; Niger | Eloi Zerbo; Burkina Faso |
| Men's +100 kg | Mouhamet Bousso; Senegal | Emmanuel Romaric Kawané; Burkina Faso | Anas El Mkabber; Morocco |
| Women's team | Senegal; Binette Diatta; Safietou Goudiaby; Marie Therese Manga; Anta Sambou; Nahamie Sambou | Ivory Coast; Assetou Coulibaly; Makourakou Diomande; Tiemongo Soro; Caroline Yapi N'De; Amy Youin | Cameroon; Joseph Essombe; Berthe Etane Ngolle; Danielle Sino Guemde |
| Women's 45 kg | Nahamie Sambou; Senegal | Josiane Danimbe Lubahitar; Chad | Caroline Yapi N'De; Ivory Coast |
| Women's 50 kg | Madalina Linguraru; Romania | Binette Diatta; Senegal | Tiemongo Soro; Ivory Coast |
| Women's 60 kg | Joseph Essombe; Cameroon | Safietou Goudiaby; Senegal | Josiane Nabi; Burkina Faso |
| Women's 70 kg | Amy Youin; Ivory Coast | Fatoumata Yarie Camara; Guinea | Marie Therese Manga; Senegal |
| Women's 80 kg | Anta Sambou; Senegal | Samsia Gassida Godah; Chad | Cătălina Axente; Romania |

=== Cultural ===
| Event | Gold | Silver | Bronze |
|---|---|---|---|
| Hip-hop dance | Sn9per Crew; Cameroon | 04 LKARWA; Morocco | Pockemon Crew; France |
| Giant puppetry | Ivoire Marionnettes; Ivory Coast | Pi; Canada | Nama; Mali |
| Ball juggling | Stylers Crew; Morocco | S3; France | Kassio Ignace; Ivory Coast |
| Painting | Yazan Halwani; Lebanon | Mbaye Babacar Diouf; Senegal | Ahmed Youssef Ahmed; Egypt |
| Sculpture | Rémi Ama Sossouvi; Benin | Émilie Grace Lavoie; New Brunswick | Serge Ecker; Luxembourg |
| Photography | Laurence-Azita Rasti; Switzerland | Anush Babajanyan; Armenia | Annie France Noël; New Brunswick |
| Digital creation | Sabrina Ratté; Canada | Aboubacar Bablé Draba; Mali | Clément Hugues; Quebec |
| Ecological creation | Jeux WASA; Canada | PARO-CI; Ivory Coast | David Ngaba; Chad |
| Song | Fanie Fayar; Congo | Awa Mounaya Yanni; Senegal | Céléna-Sophia; Wallonia |
| Storytelling | Julles Moussoki Mitchum; Congo | Compagnie Arc-en-ciel; Guinea | Najoua Darwiche; France |
| Traditional inspiration dance | Les Frères Joseph; Mauritius | Soul City; France | N'Soleh; Ivory Coast |
| Literature | Razak René; Niger | Gabriel Robichaud; New Brunswick | Mohamed Mbougar Sarr; Senegal |

=== Cycling ===
| Event | Gold | Silver | Bronze |
|---|---|---|---|
| Men's road race | Pierre Idjouadiene; France | Soufiane Sahbaoui; Morocco | Bruno Armirail; France |
| Women's road race | Pauline Allin; France | Soline Lamboley; France | Alexxa Albrecht; Quebec |

=== Judo ===
Men

| Event | Gold | Silver | Bronze |
|---|---|---|---|
| Extra-lightweight; 60 kg | Jolan Florimont; France | Flavio Dimarca; Wallonia | Lionel Schwander; Switzerland |
| Extra-lightweight; 60 kg | Jolan Florimont; France | Flavio Dimarca; Wallonia | Mohammed Jafy; Morocco |
| Half-lightweight; 66 kg | Franck Vernez; France | Gueorgui Poklitar; Quebec | Dieudonné Nama Etoga; Cameroon |
| Half-lightweight; 66 kg | Franck Vernez; France | Gueorgui Poklitar; Quebec | Imad Bassou; Morocco |
| Lightweight; 73 kg | Akil Gjakova; Kosovo | Ahmed El Meziati; Morocco | Alexandru Raicu; Romania |
| Lightweight; 73 kg | Akil Gjakova; Kosovo | Ahmed El Meziati; Morocco | Patrick Cantin; Quebec |
| Half-middleweight; 81 kg | Alpha Oumar Djalo; France | Achraf Moutii; Morocco | Saliou Ndiaye; Senegal |
| Half-middleweight; 81 kg | Alpha Oumar Djalo; France | Achraf Moutii; Morocco | Franck Bell Ngindjel; Cameroon |
| Middleweight; 90 kg | Louis Krieber-Gagnon; Quebec | Tobias Meier; Switzerland | Grigor Sahakyan; Armenia |
| Middleweight; 90 kg | Louis Krieber-Gagnon; Quebec | Tobias Meier; Switzerland | Zachary Burt; Canada |
| Half-heavyweight; 100 kg | Rebouka Ariano; France | Marc Deschenes; Canada | Luca Kunszabo; Romania |
| Half-heavyweight; 100 kg | Rebouka Ariano; France | Marc Deschenes; Canada | Ousmane Diallo; Mali |
| Heavyweight +100 kg | Messie Katanga; France | Mbagnick Ndiaye; Senegal | Jean-François Ouellet; Quebec |
| Heavyweight +100 kg | Messie Katanga; France | Mbagnick Ndiaye; Senegal | Adil Hajji; Morocco |

Women

| Event | Gold | Silver | Bronze |
|---|---|---|---|
| Extra-lightweight; 48 kg | Olfa Saoudi; Tunisia | Virginia Aymard; France | Aziza Chakir; Morocco |
| Extra-lightweight; 48 kg | Olfa Saoudi; Tunisia | Virginia Aymard; France | Diana Kwan Hu; Madagascar |
| Half-lightweight; 52 kg | Distria Krasniqi; Kosovo | Christianne Legentil; Mauritius | Tamara Silva; Switzerland |
| Half-lightweight; 52 kg | Distria Krasniqi; Kosovo | Christianne Legentil; Mauritius | Ikram Soukate; Morocco |
| Lightweight; 57 kg | Sarah Harachi; France | Zouleiha Abzetta Dabonne; Ivory Coast | Soumiya Iraoui; Morocco |
| Lightweight; 57 kg | Sarah Harachi; France | Zouleiha Abzetta Dabonne; Ivory Coast | Sarah Sylva; Mauritius |
| Half-middleweight; 63 kg | Emily Burt; Quebec | Cloe Yvin; France | Sofia Belattar; Morocco |
| Half-middleweight; 63 kg | Emily Burt; Quebec | Cloe Yvin; France | Mariem Bjaoui; Tunisia |
| Middleweight; 70 kg | Melissa Heleine; France | Alix Renaud-Roy; Quebec | Fatim Fofana; Ivory Coast |
| Middleweight; 70 kg | Melissa Heleine; France | Alix Renaud-Roy; Quebec | Ayuk Otay Arrey Sophina; Cameroon |
| Half-heavyweight; 78 kg | Stessie Bastareaud; France | Mina Coulombe; Canada | Audrey Dilane Njepang; Cameroon |
| Half-heavyweight; 78 kg | Stessie Bastareaud; France | Mina Coulombe; Canada | Sarra Mzougui; Tunisia |
| Heavyweight +78 kg | Anne Fatoumata M'Bairo; France | Andrea Eyui Mbengone; Gabon | Kimberly Carole Imongo; DR Congo |
| Heavyweight +78 kg | Anne Fatoumata M'Bairo; France | Andrea Eyui Mbengone; Gabon | Aicha Isilo; Madagascar |

=== Para-athletics ===
| Event | Class | Gold | Silver | Bronze |
|---|---|---|---|---|
| Men's 200 m | T44 | Dimitri Pavadé; France | Michaël Mayali; France | Tristan Gaël Kangbazou; Central African Republic |
| Men's long jump | T44 | Dimitri Pavadé; France | Michaël Mayali; France | Tristan Gaël Kangbazou; Central African Republic |
| Men's 200 m | T46–47 | Akué N'Guessan Kouassi; Ivory Coast | Serge Arthur Nakou; Ivory Coast | Mahamane Sacko; Mali |
| Men's long jump | T46–47 | Abdelkabir Jaddi; Morocco | Addoh Frédéric Kimou; Ivory Coast | Fayssal Atchiba; Benin |
| Men's javelin throw | F42–46 | Aimé Atchoukeu Mbithe; Cameroon | Semedo Marilson; Cape Verde | Abdelhadi El Harti; Morocco |

=== Table tennis ===
| Event | Gold | Silver | Bronze |
|---|---|---|---|
| Men's singles | Joé Seyfried; France | Alexandru Manole; Romania | Antoine Bernadet; Quebec |
| Men's singles | Joé Seyfried; France | Alexandru Manole; Romania | Gaël Vendé; Switzerland |
| Women's singles | Océane Guisnel; France | Alina Georgiana Zaharia; Romania | Abir Haj Salah; Tunisia |
| Women's singles | Océane Guisnel; France | Alina Georgiana Zaharia; Romania | Malak Khoury; Lebanon |
| Mixed doubles | Romania; Alexandru Manole; Alina Georgiana Zaharia | France; Océane Guisnel; Joé Seyfried | Switzerland; Salomé Claire Simonet; Gaël Vendé |
| Mixed doubles | Romania; Alexandru Manole; Alina Georgiana Zaharia | France; Océane Guisnel; Joé Seyfried | Vietnam; Bùi Thế Nghĩa; Phạm Thị Thu Hương |
| Mixed team | France; Océane Guisnel; Joé Seyfried | Romania; Alexandru Manole; Alina Georgiana Zaharia | Lebanon; Mohamad Hamie; Malak Khoury |
| Mixed team | France; Océane Guisnel; Joé Seyfried | Romania; Alexandru Manole; Alina Georgiana Zaharia | Switzerland; Salomé Claire Simonet; Gaël Vendé |

=== Wrestling ===
| Event | Gold | Silver | Bronze |
|---|---|---|---|
| Men's freestyle 57 kg | Steven Takahashi; Canada | Mkhitar Grigoryan; Armenia | Youssoup Deliev; France |
| Men's freestyle 57 kg | Steven Takahashi; Canada | Mkhitar Grigoryan; Armenia | Marin Filip; Romania |
| Men's freestyle 61 kg | Adama Diatta; Senegal | Ioan-Raul Donu; Romania | Darthe Capellan; Canada |
| Men's freestyle 61 kg | Adama Diatta; Senegal | Ioan-Raul Donu; Romania | Ashot Velitsyan; Armenia |
| Men's freestyle 65 kg | David Dobre; Romania | Vincent De Marinis; Quebec | Vaghinak Matevosyan; Armenia |
| Men's freestyle 65 kg | David Dobre; Romania | Vincent De Marinis; Quebec | Dillon Williams; Canada |
| Men's freestyle 70 kg | Khachatur Papikyan; Armenia | Roman Duscov; Romania | Jean Bernard Diatta; Senegal |
| Men's freestyle 70 kg | Khachatur Papikyan; Armenia | Roman Duscov; Romania | Caleb Rutner; Canada |
| Men's freestyle 74 kg | Ahmed Shamiya; Canada | Varuzhan Kajoyan; Armenia | Madalin Minzala; Romania |
| Men's freestyle 74 kg | Ahmed Shamiya; Canada | Varuzhan Kajoyan; Armenia | Guseyn Ruslanzada; Quebec |
| Men's freestyle 86 kg | Jordan Steen; Canada | Marzpet Galstyan; Armenia | Marcel Diboma; Cameroon |
| Men's freestyle 86 kg | Jordan Steen; Canada | Marzpet Galstyan; Armenia | Ion Pislaru; Romania |
| Men's freestyle 97 kg | Vlad Caras; Romania | Quentin Milliere; France | Cedric Nyamsi Tchouga; Cameroon |
| Men's freestyle 97 kg | Vlad Caras; Romania | Quentin Milliere; France | Dalton Webb; Canada |
| Men's freestyle 125 kg | Sean Molle; Canada | Frédérick Choquette; Quebec | Thiacka Faye; Senegal |
| Men's freestyle 125 kg | Sean Molle; Canada | Frédérick Choquette; Quebec | Nicolas Tavernese; France |
| Women's freestyle 48 kg | Jade Parsons; Canada | Tabatha Grunewald; France | Madalina Linguraru; Romania |
| Women's freestyle 53 kg | Kristina McLaren; Canada | Elisa Rasoanantenaina; Madagascar | Chan Raksmey Chey; Cambodia |
| Women's freestyle 53 kg | Kristina McLaren; Canada | Elisa Rasoanantenaina; Madagascar | Samantha Stewart; New Brunswick |
| Women's freestyle 55 kg | Laurence Beauregard; Quebec | Madalina Simona Tudor; Romania | Faridatou Gbadamassi; Benin |
| Women's freestyle 55 kg | Laurence Beauregard; Quebec | Madalina Simona Tudor; Romania | Elisa Savalle; France |
| Women's freestyle 58 kg | Joseph Essombe; Cameroon | Safietou Goudiaby; Senegal | Sonia Baudin; France |
| Women's freestyle 58 kg | Joseph Essombe; Cameroon | Safietou Goudiaby; Senegal | Emily Schaefer; Canada |
| Women's freestyle 60 kg | Aurelie Basset; France | Denisa Iuliana Fodor; Romania | Gertrude Prombove; Cameroon |
| Women's freestyle 60 kg | Aurelie Basset; France | Denisa Iuliana Fodor; Romania | Hannah Franson; Canada |
| Women's freestyle 63 kg | Jessica Brouillette; Canada | Linda Morais; Quebec | Berthe Etane Ngolle; Cameroon |
| Women's freestyle 63 kg | Jessica Brouillette; Canada | Linda Morais; Quebec | Kriszta Incze; Romania |
| Women's freestyle 69 kg | Anta Sambou; Senegal | Kayla Brodner; Canada | Ania Mabunga Menga; DR Congo |
| Women's freestyle 69 kg | Anta Sambou; Senegal | Kayla Brodner; Canada | Pauline Lecarpentier; France |
| Women's freestyle 75 kg | Veronica Keefe; Quebec | Danielle Sino Guemde; Cameroon | Cătălina Axente; Romania |
| Women's freestyle 75 kg | Veronica Keefe; Quebec | Danielle Sino Guemde; Cameroon | Gracelynn Doogan; Canada |
