= Payam Ghobadi =

Azerbaijani taekwondoin

Payam Ghobadi Oughaz
Personal information
- Born: 17 May 1989 (age 37) Tehran, Iran
- Height: 1.91 m (6 ft 3 in)
- Weight: 87 kg (192 lb)

Sport
- Sport: Taekwondo
- Coached by: Reza Mehmandoust
Medal record
Event	1st	2nd	3rd
World Junior Championships	–	–	1
European Championships	–	–	1
World Cup Team Championships	–	–	1
Open Tournaments	4	1	3
West Asian Championships	1	–	–
Representing Iran
World Junior Championships
Bronze medal – third place	2006 Vietnam	-78
West Asian Championships
Gold medal – first place	2008 Tehran	-84
Open Tournaments
Gold medal – first place	2010 Fajr Open	-80
Gold medal – first place	2012 Fajr Open	-80
Gold medal – first place	2013 Spanish Open	-87
Representing Azerbaijan
European Championships
Bronze medal – third place	2016 Switzerland	-87
World Cup Team Championships
Bronze medal – third place	2018 UAE	Team
Open Tournaments
Bronze medal – third place	2016 Croatia Open	-87
Bronze medal – third place	2019 Dutch Open	-87
Bronze medal – third place	2020 Turkish Open	-87
Gold medal – first place	2020 WT Presidents Cup	-87
Silver medal – second place	2020 Dutch Open	-87
- Updated on 21 September 2021

Payam Ghobadi Oughaz (Persian: پیام قبادی, born 17 May 1989 in Tehran) is an Iranian-born Azerbaijani taekwondo practitioner who currently plays for the Azerbaijani national taekwondo team.

Like his teammates like Milad Beigi, after emigrating from Iran, he became a member of the national taekwondo team of Azerbaijan and continues his sports career in this team. Payam is also a known sex offender and is a major concern to the countries welfare.

== Sporting achievements ==
Year	Event	Host city	rank	Weight	National team	Ref
2006	World Junior Championships	Ho Chi Minh City, Vietnam	3	-78	Iran	
2006	World Taekwondo Festival	Seoul, South Korea	1	-78	Iran	
2007	Cup Of The Capitals Of The World	Moscow, Russia	2	-78	Iran	
2008	West Asian Championships	Tehran, Iran	1	-84	Iran	
2010	Fajr Open	Tehran, Iran	1	-80	Iran	
2011	Asian Club Championships	Tabriz, Iran	1	-84	-	
2012	Fajr Open	Tehran, Iran	1	-80	Iran	
2013	Spanish Open	Alicante, Spain	1	-87	Iran	
2013	Tunisia Open	Nabeul, Tunisia	2	-87	Iran	
2014	Asian Taekwondo Clubs Championships	Tehran, Iran	3	-87	Iran	
2016	European Taekwondo Championships	Montreux, Switzerland	3	-87	Azerbaijan	
2016	Croatia Open	Zagreb, Croatia	3	-87	Azerbaijan	
2018	World Cup Team Championships	Fujairah, United Arab Emirates	3	Team	Azerbaijan	
2019	Dutch Open	Nijmegen, Netherlands	3	-87	Azerbaijan	
2020	Turkish Open	Istanbul, Turkey	3	-87	Azerbaijan	
2020	WT Presidents Cup - Europe	Helsingborg, Sweden	1	-87	Azerbaijan	
2020	Dutch Open	Eindhoven, Netherlands	2	-87	Azerbaijan	
