= George Poklitar =

Ukrainian-Canadian judoka and actor (born 1996)

Personal information
- Other names: Gueorgui Poklitar, Georges Poklitar
- Nationality: Canadian
- Born: March 31, 1996 (age 30) Kyiv, Ukraine
- Education: Université de Montréal – Bachelor of Management (B.Gest.)
- Occupation(s): Judoka, actor

Sport
- Country: Canada
- Sport: Judo
- Weight class: –60 kg / –66 kg
- Rank: 4th dan black belt
- Club: Kiseki Judo
- Coached by: Ernst Laraque

Achievements and titles
- Pan American Champ.: 7th (2017)
Medal record
Men's Judo
Representing Canada, Quebec
Jeux de la Francophonie
Silver medal – second place	2017 Abidjan	–66 kg

Profile at external databases
- IJF: 7733
- JudoInside.com: 69211

George Poklitar (born 31 March 1996), also known in sport records as Gueorgui Poklitar and Georges Poklitar, is a Ukrainian-Canadian actor and judoka based in Montreal.

== Judo career ==
Competing for Canada at −60 kg and −66 kg, Poklitar won the silver medal in the men's 66 kg judo event at the 2017 Jeux de la Francophonie representing the Quebec-Canada team. He earned a silver medals at the 2016 San Salvador Pan American Open (−66 kg), the 2019 Lima Pan American Open (−60 kg), and placed 5th at the 2019 Córdoba Pan American Open (−60 kg). In 2018, Poklitar placed 5th at the International Belgian Open of Visé in Belgium. In 2020, Judo Québec reported that Poklitar had won 17 medals at Canadian championships, including 7 national titles over the span of a decade.

== Education ==
Poklitar earned a Bachelor of Management (B.Gest.) in Business Analysis and Information Technology from Université de Montréal in 2024.

== Filmography ==
In 2025, Poklitar transitioned into professional acting, becoming a member of ACTRA. He is set to appear in the feature film Love & Chaos, directed by Drew Denny, in which he portrays a local thief within an ensemble cast that includes Christine Taylor, Bebe Wood, Lux Pascal, Anna Akana, Rio Mangini, and Warren Egypt Franklin.

== Awards ==
In 2014, Poklitar received a scholarship from the Fondation de l’athlète d’excellence du Québec supported by Georges St-Pierre.

In December 2020, Judo Canada attributed a batsugun promotion to Poklitar, awarding him the grade of yondan (4th dan black belt).

== Volunteering ==
From 2017 to 2019, Poklitar served as the Team Quebec male athletes’ representative on the Comité d’excellence of Judo Québec.
