= 1990 European Taekwondo Championships =

Taekwondo competition

- Location: Aarhus, Denmark
- Start date: 18 October
- End date: 21 October

The 1990 European Taekwondo Championships were held in Aarhus, Denmark. The event took place from 18 to 21 October, 1990.

== Medals table ==
* Host nation (Denmark)

Rank	Nation	Gold	Silver	Bronze	Total
1	Turkey	5	4	5	14
2	Denmark*	4	2	1	7
3	Germany	4	0	2	6
4	Spain	2	2	6	10
5	Netherlands	1	1	2	4
6	Italy	0	2	2	4
7	France	0	1	4	5
8	Greece	0	1	3	4
9	Finland	0	1	2	3
10	Austria	0	1	0	1
10	Norway	0	1	0	1
12	Sweden	0	0	2	2
12	Yugoslavia	0	0	2	2
14	Great Britain	0	0	1	1
Totals (14 entries)		16	16	32	64

== Medal summary ==
=== Men ===
Event	Gold	Silver	Bronze
50 kg	Gergely Salim; Denmark	Cihat Kutluca; Turkey	Salah Abousaid; France
50 kg	Gergely Salim; Denmark	Cihat Kutluca; Turkey	Thomas Hermann; Germany
54 kg	Josef Salim; Denmark	Thierry Degrenga; France	Ekrem Boyalı; Turkey
54 kg	Josef Salim; Denmark	Thierry Degrenga; France	Franciso Hernán; Spain
58 kg	Michael Østergaard; Denmark	Domenico D'Alise; Italy	Ángel Alonso; Spain
58 kg	Michael Østergaard; Denmark	Domenico D'Alise; Italy	Alberto Kleber; Netherlands
64 kg	Musa Çiçek; Germany	Sadık Oflu; Turkey	Tommy Mortensen; Denmark
64 kg	Musa Çiçek; Germany	Sadık Oflu; Turkey	Hubert Sinègre; France
70 kg	Georg Streif; Germany	Eleftherios Glanias; Greece	Timo Karjalainen; Finland
70 kg	Georg Streif; Germany	Eleftherios Glanias; Greece	Enrique Mendoza; Spain
76 kg	Antonio Pérez Acevedo; Spain	Osman Şener Özsoy; Turkey	Nico Forsberg; Sweden
76 kg	Antonio Pérez Acevedo; Spain	Osman Şener Özsoy; Turkey	Marcello Pezzolla; Italy
83 kg	Metin Şahin; Turkey	Leendert Verwaij; Netherlands	Lennox Carty; Great Britain
83 kg	Metin Şahin; Turkey	Leendert Verwaij; Netherlands	Robert Tomašević; Yugoslavia
+83 kg	Ali Şahin; Turkey	Tonny Sørensen; Denmark	Nebojsa Ciric; Netherlands
+83 kg	Ali Şahin; Turkey	Tonny Sørensen; Denmark	Ivan Radoš; Yugoslavia

=== Women ===
Event	Gold	Silver	Bronze
43 kg	Arzu Ceylan; Turkey	Helle Panzieri; Denmark	Sabrina Agarbati; Italy
43 kg	Arzu Ceylan; Turkey	Helle Panzieri; Denmark	María Rosa Moreno; Spain
47 kg	Serpil Gür; Turkey	Piera Muggiri; Italy	Loles Ballester; Spain
47 kg	Serpil Gür; Turkey	Piera Muggiri; Italy	Aleka Frantzi; Greece
51 kg	Anne Mette Christensen; Denmark	Raquel Palacios; Spain	Triantafillia Karasiouna; Greece
51 kg	Anne Mette Christensen; Denmark	Raquel Palacios; Spain	Döndü Şahin; Turkey
55 kg	Sarah Maitimu; Netherlands	Idoya Jiménez; Spain	Sibel Dinçer; Turkey
55 kg	Sarah Maitimu; Netherlands	Idoya Jiménez; Spain	Yvonne Tillmann; Germany
60 kg	Ziyada Boztepe; Turkey	Judith Pirchmoser; Austria	Elena Benítez; Spain
60 kg	Ziyada Boztepe; Turkey	Judith Pirchmoser; Austria	Patricia Reynolds; France
65 kg	Coral Bistuer; Spain	Kirsimarja Koskinen; Finland	Brigitte Gefroy; France
65 kg	Coral Bistuer; Spain	Kirsimarja Koskinen; Finland	Şeyda Sarafoğlu; Turkey
70 kg	Angelika Pastorelli; Italy	Gunhild Wallden; Norway	Yahzi Hava; Turkey
70 kg	Angelika Pastorelli; Italy	Gunhild Wallden; Norway	Veera Liukkonen; Finland
+70 kg	Bettina Hipf; Germany	Mine Arduç; Turkey	Gethemani Orfanidou; Greece
+70 kg	Bettina Hipf; Germany	Mine Arduç; Turkey	Anna Widehov; Sweden
