= Zoran Simović =

Yugoslav footballer

Personal information
- Date of birth: 2 November 1954 (age 71)
- Place of birth: Mojkovac, PR Montenegro, FPR Yugoslavia
- Height: 1.86 m (6 ft 1 in)
- Position: Goalkeeper

Youth career
- Obilićevo Kruševac
- Napredak Kruševac

Senior career*
Years	Team	Apps	(Gls)
1973–1980	Napredak Kruševac	146	(3)
1980–1984	Hajduk Split	84	(0)
1984–1990	Galatasaray	192	(1)
Total		422	(4)

International career
1983–1984	Yugoslavia	10	(0)
- * Club domestic league appearances and goals

Zoran Simović (Cyrillic: Зоран Симовић; born 2 November 1954) is a former Yugoslav and Serbian footballer who played as a goalkeeper.

Simović was named the Yugoslav Footballer of the Year in 1983. He also won the Turkish Footballer of the Year award for three consecutive years (1985, 1986, and 1987).

== Club career ==
Born in Mojkovac, PR Montenegro, Simović moved with his family to Kruševac, PR Serbia in 1965. He played for Napredak Kruševac during the 1970s, helping them gain promotion to the Yugoslav First League on two occasions (1975–76 and 1977–78). In 1980, Simović was transferred to Hajduk Split. He helped the club win the Yugoslav Cup in the 1983–84 season.

In 1984, Simović moved abroad to Turkey and signed with Galatasaray. He spent six seasons at the club and won four trophies, including back-to-back national championships (1986–87 and 1987–88). In total, Simović made 192 league appearances and scored once for Galatasaray, converting a penalty kick in a 6–0 home win over Kahramanmaraşspor in April 1989.

== International career ==
Simović made his debut for Yugoslavia in an October 1983 Euro qualifier against Norway and would go on to earn a total of 10 caps. He was the team's first-choice goalkeeper at UEFA Euro 1984, making his final international appearance against hosts France.

== Career statistics ==
Appearances and goals by club, season and competition
Club	Season	League	
Club	Season	Apps	Goals
Napredak Kruševac	1973–74	21	0
Napredak Kruševac	1974–75	17	2
Napredak Kruševac	1975–76	9	0
Napredak Kruševac	1976–77	18	0
Napredak Kruševac	1977–78	15	1
Napredak Kruševac	1978–79	33	0
Napredak Kruševac	1979–80	33	0
Napredak Kruševac	Total	146	3

== Honours ==
Napredak Kruševac

- Yugoslav Second League: 1975–76, 1977–78

Hajduk Split

- Yugoslav Cup: 1983–84

Galatasaray

- 1.Lig: 1986–87, 1987–88
- Turkish Cup: 1984–85
- Turkish Super Cup: 1987, 1988

Individual

- Yugoslav Footballer of the Year: 1983
- Turkish Footballer of the Year: 1985, 1986, 1987
