= 2012 World Cup Taekwondo Team Championships =

Taekwondo competition

2012 Taekwondo World Cup
- Venue: Centro Deportivo Betico Croes
- Location: Santa Cruz, Aruba
- Dates: 23–25 November 2012

Champions
- Men: South Korea
- Women: China

The 2012 World Cup Taekwondo Team Championships is the 4th edition of the World Cup Taekwondo Team Championships, and was held at Centro Deportivo Betico Croes in Santa Cruz, Aruba from November 23 to November 25, 2012.

== Medalists ==
Event	Gold	Silver	Bronze
Men	South Korea; Han kyeo-re Jeon Jae-hyun; Jung Jin-young; Kim Se-jin; Lee Chang-min; Lee Dong-eon; Lee Dong-mun; Lee Soon-kil; Song Ji-hoon; Yun Hee-sung	Iran; Farzad Abdollahi; Mehran Askari; Masoud Hajji-Zavareh; Behzad Ilkhani; Vahid Issabeigloo; Yousef Karami; Jalal Khoddami; Alireza Nasr Azadani; Rouhollah Talebi	China; Bai Xinlong; Chen Linglong; Li Lai; Ma Zhaoyong; Qiao Sen; Song Zhaoxiang; Sun Yuheng; Wang Guangshuai; Wang Jinlong
Men	South Korea; Han kyeo-re Jeon Jae-hyun; Jung Jin-young; Kim Se-jin; Lee Chang-min; Lee Dong-eon; Lee Dong-mun; Lee Soon-kil; Song Ji-hoon; Yun Hee-sung	Iran; Farzad Abdollahi; Mehran Askari; Masoud Hajji-Zavareh; Behzad Ilkhani; Vahid Issabeigloo; Yousef Karami; Jalal Khoddami; Alireza Nasr Azadani; Rouhollah Talebi	Spain; Rosendo Alonso; Raúl Martínez; Aram Muñoz; Fernando Rascado; Daniel Ros; Gaspar Trabalón
Women	China; Guo Ting; Li Wanhui; Li Yue; Li Zhaoyi; Liu Jing; Liu Liping; Song Qiming; Wang Yun; Zhang Hua	France; Maéva Coutant; Aline Dossou-Gbete; Marlène Harnois; Floriane Liborio; Haby Niaré; Magda Wiet-Hénin	Russia; Anna Aleshina; Viktoria Iakovleva; Daria Ivanova; Yana Loshkareva; Anastasia Lozhkina; Ekaterina Mitrofanova; Anastasia Skipina; Daria Zhuravleva
Women	China; Guo Ting; Li Wanhui; Li Yue; Li Zhaoyi; Liu Jing; Liu Liping; Song Qiming; Wang Yun; Zhang Hua	France; Maéva Coutant; Aline Dossou-Gbete; Marlène Harnois; Floriane Liborio; Haby Niaré; Magda Wiet-Hénin	Croatia; Jelena Ivančić; Marina Sumić; Ana Zaninović; Martina Zubčić; Antonija Žeravica

== Men ==
=== Preliminary round ===
==== Group A ====
Pos	Team	Pld	W	D	L	PF	PA	PD	Pts	IRI	DOM	RUS
1	Iran	2	2	0	0	43	20	+23	6	—	25–5	18–15
2	Dominican Republic	2	1	0	1	33	42	−9	3	5–25	—	28–17
3	Russia	2	0	0	2	32	46	−14	0	15–18	17–28	—

Source: WT

==== Group B ====
Pos	Team	Pld	W	D	L	PF	PA	PD	Pts	KOR	USA	EGY
1	South Korea	2	2	0	0	45	31	+14	6	—	26–17	19–14
2	United States	2	1	0	1	41	38	+3	3	17–26	—	24–12
3	Egypt	2	0	0	2	26	43	−17	0	14–19	12–24	—

Source: WT

==== Group C ====
Pos	Team	Pld	W	D	L	PF	PA	PD	Pts	ESP	BRA	VEN
1	Spain	2	2	0	0	49	34	+15	6	—	22–15	27–19
2	Brazil	2	1	0	1	49	35	+14	3	15–22	—	34–13
3	Venezuela	2	0	0	2	32	61	−29	0	19–27	13–34	—

Source: WT

==== Group D ====
Pos	Team	Pld	W	D	L	PF	PA	PD	Pts	CHN	TPE	UZB	ARU
1	China	3	3	0	0	92	31	+61	9	—	32–15	24–12	36–4
2	Chinese Taipei	3	2	0	1	81	61	+20	6	15–32	—	31–13	35–16
3	Uzbekistan	3	1	0	2	73	73	0	3	12–24	13–31	—	48–18
4	Aruba	3	0	0	3	38	119	−81	0	4–36	16–35	18–48	—

Source: WT

=== Knockout round ===
Quarterfinals		Semifinals		Final
Iran	WO
United States		Iran	19
Brazil	13	China	18
China	24			Iran	13
Spain	17			South Korea	27
Chinese Taipei	11	Spain	18
Dominican Republic	14	South Korea	21
South Korea	23

== Women ==
=== Preliminary round ===
==== Group A ====
Pos	Team	Pld	W	D	L	PF	PA	PD	Pts	RUS	KOR	VEN
1	Russia	2	2	0	0	61	29	+32	6	—	23–22	38–7
2	South Korea	2	1	0	1	54	29	+25	3	22–23	—	32–6
3	Venezuela	2	0	0	2	13	70	−57	0	7–38	6–32	—

Source: WT

==== Group B ====
Pos	Team	Pld	W	D	L	PF	PA	PD	Pts	CHN	COL	BRA
1	China	2	2	0	0	35	21	+14	6	—	18–8	17–13
2	Colombia	2	1	0	1	31	38	−7	3	8–18	—	23–20
3	Brazil	2	0	0	2	33	40	−7	0	13–17	20–23	—

Source: WT

==== Group C ====
Pos	Team	Pld	W	D	L	PF	PA	PD	Pts	CRO	FRA	TPE	USA
1	Croatia	3	2	0	1	43	28	+15	6	—	8–12	15–12	20–4
2	France	3	2	0	1	44	41	+3	6	12–8	—	14–13	18–20
3	Chinese Taipei	3	1	0	2	49	45	+4	3	12–15	13–14	—	24–16
4	United States	3	1	0	2	40	62	−22	3	4–20	20–18	16–24	—

Source: WT

=== Knockout round ===
Quarterfinals		Semifinals		Final
		Russia	9
Colombia	15	France	21
France	24			France	11
South Korea	12			China	12
Croatia	13	Croatia	15
		China	17
