= 2016 World Cup Taekwondo Team Championships =

Taekwondo competition

2016 Taekwondo World Cup
- Venue: Sarhadchi Olympic Sports Complex
- Location: Baku, Azerbaijan
- Dates: 12–13 December 2016

Champions
- Men: Azerbaijan
- Women: China

The 2016 World Cup Taekwondo Team Championships was the 8th edition of the World Cup Taekwondo Team Championships, and was held in Baku, Azerbaijan from December 12 to December 13, 2016.

Teams were allowed to augment their squads with maximum two athletes from other countries.

== Medalists ==
Event	Gold	Silver	Bronze
Men	Azerbaijan; Sina Bahrami; Milad Beigi; Said Guliyev; Radik Isayev; Mahammad Mammadov; Aykhan Taghizade	South Korea; In Kyo-don; Jeong Yun-jo; Kim Hyeon-seung; Lee Yong-won; Shin Dong-yun; Won Jong-hun	Belgium; Jaouad Achab; Salaheddine Bensaleh; Marc-André Bergeron; Nicholas Corten; Si Mohamed Ketbi; Mourad Laachraoui
Men	Azerbaijan; Sina Bahrami; Milad Beigi; Said Guliyev; Radik Isayev; Mahammad Mammadov; Aykhan Taghizade	South Korea; In Kyo-don; Jeong Yun-jo; Kim Hyeon-seung; Lee Yong-won; Shin Dong-yun; Won Jong-hun	Turkey; Cihat Çakmak; Hasan Can Lazoğlu; Yunus Sarı; Berkan Süngü; Servet Tazegül; Serdar Yüksel
Women	China; Guo Yunfei; Shao Fenfen; Wenren Yuntao; Zhan Tianrui; Zheng Shuyin; Zhou Meiling	South Korea; An Sae-bom; Jang You-jin; Kim Bo-mi; Kim Min-jeong; Lee Da-bin; Yoon Jeong-yeon	Turkey; Dürdane Altunel; Nafia Kuş; Nur Tatar; İrem Yaman; Rukiye Yıldırım
Women	China; Guo Yunfei; Shao Fenfen; Wenren Yuntao; Zhan Tianrui; Zheng Shuyin; Zhou Meiling	South Korea; An Sae-bom; Jang You-jin; Kim Bo-mi; Kim Min-jeong; Lee Da-bin; Yoon Jeong-yeon	Russia; Alina Ikaeva; Polina Khan; Ekaterina Kramarenko; Tatiana Kudashova; Yulia Miyuts; Karina Zhdanova
Mixed	South Korea; In Kyo-don; Noh Min-woo; Shin Dong-yun; An Sae-bom; Lim So-ra	Russia; Arman Irgaliev; Maksim Khramtsov; Alexey Pryazhnikov; Yulia Miyuts; Karina Zhdanova	Belgium; Nicholas Corten; Seif Eissa; Si Mohamed Ketbi; Indra Craen; Daniela Rotolo
Mixed	South Korea; In Kyo-don; Noh Min-woo; Shin Dong-yun; An Sae-bom; Lim So-ra	Russia; Arman Irgaliev; Maksim Khramtsov; Alexey Pryazhnikov; Yulia Miyuts; Karina Zhdanova	United States; Sohwon Kim; Hanssel Llanos; Thomas Rahimi; Aziza Chambers; Jackie Galloway

- Foreign athletes are shown in italic.

== Men ==
=== Preliminary round ===
==== Group A ====
Pos	Team	Pld	W	D	L	PF	PA	PD	Pts	KOR	TUR	RUS	IRI
1	South Korea	3	2	0	1	74	59	+15	6	—	26–27	22–19	26–13
2	Turkey	3	2	0	1	68	65	+3	6	27–26	—	10–20	31–19
3	Russia	3	1	0	2	54	48	+6	3	19–22	20–10	—	15–16
4	Iran	3	1	0	2	48	72	−24	3	13–26	19–31	16–15	—

Source: WT

==== Group B ====
Pos	Team	Pld	W	D	L	PF	PA	PD	Pts	AZE	BEL	USA
1	Azerbaijan	2	2	0	0	69	12	+57	6	—	27–8	42–4
2	Belgium	2	1	0	1	27	37	−10	3	8–27	—	19–10
3	United States	2	0	0	2	14	61	−47	0	4–42	10–19	—

Source: WT

=== Knockout round ===
Semifinals		Final
South Korea	43
Belgium	13	South Korea	5
Turkey	3	Azerbaijan	21
Azerbaijan	33

== Women ==
=== Preliminary round ===
==== Group A ====
Pos	Team	Pld	W	D	L	PF	PA	PD	Pts
1	China	3	3	0	0	29	13	+16	9
2	Russia	3	2	0	1	35	27	+8	6
3	Italy	3	1	0	2	30	35	−5	3
4	France	3	0	0	3	22	41	−19	0

Source: WT

==== Group B ====
Pos	Team	Pld	W	D	L	PF	PA	PD	Pts	KOR	TUR	AZE	USA
1	South Korea	3	3	0	0	61	30	+31	9	—	16–14	24–2	21–14
2	Turkey	3	2	0	1	40	30	+10	6	14–16	—	11–1	15–13
3	Azerbaijan	3	1	0	2	14	41	−27	3	2–24	1–11	—	11–6
4	United States	3	0	0	3	33	47	−14	0	14–21	13–15	6–11	—

Source: WT

=== Knockout round ===
Semifinals		Final
China	9
Turkey	6	China	6
Russia	10	South Korea	4
South Korea	17

== Mixed ==
Semifinals		Final
Belgium	6
South Korea	15	South Korea	9
United States	8	Russia	7
Russia	19
