= 2014 World Cup Taekwondo Team Championships =

Taekwondo competition

2014 Taekwondo World Cup
- Venue: Centro de Congresos Querétaro
- Location: Querétaro, Mexico
- Dates: 6–7 December 2014

Champions
- Men: Russia
- Women: South Korea

The 2014 World Cup Taekwondo Team Championships was the 6th edition of the World Cup Taekwondo Team Championships, and was held in Querétaro, Mexico from December 6 to December 7, 2014.

Teams were allowed to augment their squads with maximum two athletes from other countries.

== Medalists ==
| Event | Gold | Silver | Bronze |
|---|---|---|---|
| Men | Russia; Philipp Belov; Bolat Izutdinov; Anton Kotkov; Vladislav Larin; Konstantin Minin; Viacheslav Minin; Vasily Nikitin | Mexico; Uriel Adriano; Sebastián Crismanich; Saúl Gutiérrez; Moisés Hernández; Abel Mendoza; Isaac Torres; Damián Villa | Iran; Farzad Abdollahi; Farzan Ashourzadeh; Mohammad Bagheri Motamed; Masoud Hajji-Zavareh; Mehdi Khodabakhshi; Hadi Mostaan; Alireza Nasr Azadani |
| Men | Russia; Philipp Belov; Bolat Izutdinov; Anton Kotkov; Vladislav Larin; Konstantin Minin; Viacheslav Minin; Vasily Nikitin | Mexico; Uriel Adriano; Sebastián Crismanich; Saúl Gutiérrez; Moisés Hernández; Abel Mendoza; Isaac Torres; Damián Villa | South Korea; Jang Se-wook; Jeong Chan-gi; Kim Hun; Kim Je-yeup; Lee Sang-je; Park Yong-hyun; Song Moon-chul |
| Women | South Korea; Hwang Kyung-seon; Kim Hwi-lang; Kim Hye-jeong; Kim Mi-kyung; Oh Hye-ri; Park Hye-mi; Seo So-young | Ivory Coast; Bouma Ferimata Coulibaly; Hadja Diabaté; Banassa Diomandé; Ruth Gbagbi; Mamina Koné; Nadège N'Dri; Awa Ouattara | China; Guo Yunfei; Hou Yuzhuo; Li Donghua; Li Zhaoyi; Wu Jingyu; Zhang Hua; Zheng Shuyin |
| Women | South Korea; Hwang Kyung-seon; Kim Hwi-lang; Kim Hye-jeong; Kim Mi-kyung; Oh Hye-ri; Park Hye-mi; Seo So-young | Ivory Coast; Bouma Ferimata Coulibaly; Hadja Diabaté; Banassa Diomandé; Ruth Gbagbi; Mamina Koné; Nadège N'Dri; Awa Ouattara | France; Yasmina Aziez; Gwladys Épangue; Anne-Caroline Graffe; Floriane Liborio; Hedaya Malak; Haby Niaré; Magda Wiet-Hénin |

- Foreign athletes are shown in italic.

== Men ==
=== Preliminary round ===
==== Group A ====
| Pos | Team | Pld | W | D | L | PF | PA | PD | Pts | IRI | KOR | GER | CIV |
|---|---|---|---|---|---|---|---|---|---|---|---|---|---|
| 1 | Iran | 3 | 3 | 0 | 0 | 61 | 42 | +19 | 9 | — | 21–19 | 23–8 | 17–15 |
| 2 | South Korea | 3 | 2 | 0 | 1 | 84 | 63 | +21 | 6 | 19–21 | — | 19–12 | 46–30 |
| 3 | Germany | 3 | 1 | 0 | 2 | 48 | 69 | −21 | 3 | 8–23 | 12–19 | — | 28–27 |
| 4 | Ivory Coast | 3 | 0 | 0 | 3 | 72 | 91 | −19 | 0 | 15–17 | 30–46 | 27–28 | — |

Source: Mas Taekwondo

==== Group B ====
| Pos | Team | Pld | W | D | L | PF | PA | PD | Pts | RUS | MEX | FRA | USA |
|---|---|---|---|---|---|---|---|---|---|---|---|---|---|
| 1 | Russia | 3 | 2 | 1 | 0 | 71 | 49 | +22 | 7 | — | 20–20 | 17–14 | 34–15 |
| 2 | Mexico | 3 | 2 | 1 | 0 | 77 | 59 | +18 | 7 | 20–20 | — | 30–19 | 27–20 |
| 3 | France | 3 | 1 | 0 | 2 | 73 | 47 | +26 | 3 | 14–17 | 19–30 | — | WO |
| 4 | United States | 3 | 0 | 0 | 3 | 35 | 101 | −66 | 0 | 15–34 | 20–27 | 0–40 | — |

Source: Mas Taekwondo

=== Knockout round ===
| Semifinals | | Final |
| Iran | 39 |
| Mexico | 45 | Mexico | 26 |
| South Korea | 38 | Russia | 29 |
| Russia | 51 |

== Women ==
=== Preliminary round ===
==== Group A ====
| Pos | Team | Pld | W | D | L | PF | PA | PD | Pts | KOR | CIV | USA | COL |
|---|---|---|---|---|---|---|---|---|---|---|---|---|---|
| 1 | South Korea | 3 | 3 | 0 | 0 | 29 | 15 | +14 | 9 | — | 18–7 | 11–8 | DQ |
| 2 | Ivory Coast | 3 | 2 | 0 | 1 | 35 | 33 | +2 | 6 | 7–18 | — | 28–15 | DQ |
| 3 | United States | 3 | 1 | 0 | 2 | 23 | 39 | −16 | 3 | 8–11 | 15–28 | — | DQ |
| 4 | Colombia | 3 | 0 | 0 | 3 | 0 | 0 | 0 | 0 | | | | — |

Source: Mas Taekwondo

==== Group B ====
| Pos | Team | Pld | W | D | L | PF | PA | PD | Pts | FRA | CHN | MEX | RUS |
|---|---|---|---|---|---|---|---|---|---|---|---|---|---|
| 1 | France | 3 | 2 | 1 | 0 | 31 | 28 | +3 | 7 | — | 7–6 | 13–11 | 11–11 |
| 2 | China | 3 | 2 | 0 | 1 | 48 | 33 | +15 | 6 | 6–7 | — | 27–12 | 15–14 |
| 3 | Mexico | 3 | 1 | 0 | 2 | 37 | 48 | −11 | 3 | 11–13 | 12–27 | — | 14–8 |
| 4 | Russia | 3 | 0 | 1 | 2 | 33 | 40 | −7 | 1 | 11–11 | 14–15 | 8–14 | — |

Source: Mas Taekwondo

=== Knockout round ===
| Semifinals | | Final |
| South Korea | 33 |
| China | 24 | South Korea | 47 |
| Ivory Coast | 16 | Ivory Coast | 25 |
| France | 14 |
