= Mine Arduç =

Turkish taekwondo practitioner

Sport
- Country: Turkey
- Sport: Taekwondo
Medal record
Women's taekwondo
Representing Turkey
European Championships
Silver medal – second place	1988 Ankara	+70 kg
Silver medal – second place	1990 Aarhus	+70 kg

Mine Arduç is a Turkish taekwondo practitioner. She competed at the 1988 European Taekwondo Championships, winning the silver medal in the +70 kg event. She also competed at the 1990 European Taekwondo Championships, winning the silver medal in the same event.
