= 2006 World Cup Taekwondo Team Championships =

Taekwondo competition

2006 Taekwondo World Cup
- Venue: Indoor Stadium Huamark
- Location: Bangkok, Thailand
- Dates: 18 September 2006

Champions
- Men: South Korea
- Women: South Korea

The 2006 World Cup Taekwondo Team Championships is the 1st edition of the World Cup Taekwondo Team Championships, and was held at Indoor Stadium Huamark in Bangkok, Thailand on September 18, 2006.

In the individual competition of the World Cup on September 14–17, Korea won seven gold medals, two silver medals and four bronze medals overall, followed by Spain with two golds, two silvers and three bronzes and In the one-day team competition of the World Cup Championships on September 18, Korea won both male and female team titles. In the female division, Turkey stood at second place, with China finishing third. In the male division, Iran came second and France third. The best 8 male and female teams of the individual competition were allowed to compete in the team event.

== Men ==
Quarterfinals
1	South Korea	3
8	Italy	2
5	Greece
4	France	WO
3	Thailand	2
6	Australia	3
7	Jordan	2
2	Iran	3

Semifinals
1	South Korea	3
4	France	2
6	Australia	2
2	Iran	3

Final
1	South Korea	3
2	Iran	2
Bronze medal match
4	France	4
6	Australia	1

== Women ==
Quarterfinals
1	South Korea	3
8	Germany	2
5	Norway	2
4	China	3
3	Australia	2
6	Turkey	3
7	Sweden	3
2	Thailand	2

Semifinals
1	South Korea	3
4	China	2
6	Turkey	3
7	Sweden	2

Final
1	South Korea	3
6	Turkey	2
Bronze medal match
4	China	3
7	Sweden	2
