= 1994 European Taekwondo Championships =

Taekwondo competition

- Location: Zagreb, Croatia
- Start date: 28 October
- End date: 30 October

The 1994 European Taekwondo Championships were held in Zagreb, Croatia. The event took place from 28 to 30 October, 1994.

== Medals table ==
* Host nation (Croatia)

Rank	Nation	Gold	Silver	Bronze	Total
1	Spain	7	1	2	10
2	Greece	2	1	1	4
3	Turkey	1	4	0	5
4	Croatia*	1	3	2	6
5	Denmark	1	1	3	5
5	Great Britain	1	1	3	5
7	France	1	1	2	4
8	Germany	1	0	5	6
9	Russia	1	0	0	1
10	Italy	0	3	2	5
11	Netherlands	0	1	1	2
12	Finland	0	0	4	4
13	Sweden	0	0	3	3
14	Belarus	0	0	2	2
15	Austria	0	0	1	1
15	Ireland	0	0	1	1
Totals (16 entries)		16	16	32	64

== Medal summary ==
=== Men ===
Event	Gold	Silver	Bronze
50 kg	Gergely Salim; Denmark	Mert Tuncer; Turkey	Željko Jurčić; Croatia
50 kg	Gergely Salim; Denmark	Mert Tuncer; Turkey	Luigi Sarnataro; Italy
54 kg	Aydın Ateş; Germany	Cihat Kutluca; Turkey	Abror Haider; Denmark
54 kg	Aydın Ateş; Germany	Cihat Kutluca; Turkey	José Luis Prieto; Spain
58 kg	Gabriel Esparza; Spain	Ahmet Evcimen; Turkey	Josef Salim; Denmark
58 kg	Gabriel Esparza; Spain	Ahmet Evcimen; Turkey	Jesper Skaneby; Sweden
64 kg	Franciso Zas; Spain	Claudio Nolano; Italy	Arthur Noot; Netherlands
64 kg	Franciso Zas; Spain	Claudio Nolano; Italy	Igor Romazhkevich; Belarus
70 kg	Óscar Sánchez; Spain	Domenico D'Alise; Italy	Aziz Acharki; Germany
70 kg	Óscar Sánchez; Spain	Domenico D'Alise; Italy	Lee Bennett; Ireland
76 kg	Dragan Jurily; Croatia	Theodoras Milonas; Greece	Marko Pokka; Finland
76 kg	Dragan Jurily; Croatia	Theodoras Milonas; Greece	Marco Scheiterbauer; Germany
83 kg	Juan Wright; Spain	Mikaël Meloul; France	Ivan Brljevic; Sweden
83 kg	Juan Wright; Spain	Mikaël Meloul; France	Joonas Soila; Finland
+83 kg	Pascal Gentil; France	Jan Glerup; Denmark	Massimiliano Romano; Italy
+83 kg	Pascal Gentil; France	Jan Glerup; Denmark	Olaf Wilkens; Germany

=== Women ===
Event	Gold	Silver	Bronze
43 kg	Triantafillia Karasiouna; Greece	Gemma Jones; Great Britain	Coral Falco; Spain
43 kg	Triantafillia Karasiouna; Greece	Gemma Jones; Great Britain	Tharshni Thevathasan; Germany
47 kg	Svetlana Noskova; Russia	Piera Muggiri; Italy	Ana Katalinić; Croatia
47 kg	Svetlana Noskova; Russia	Piera Muggiri; Italy	Janet Vousden; Great Britain
51 kg	Elisabet Delgado; Spain	Marijeta Željković; Croatia	Trine Nielsen; Denmark
51 kg	Elisabet Delgado; Spain	Marijeta Željković; Croatia	Cathrin Vetter; Germany
55 kg	Idoya Jiménez; Spain	Ayşegül Ergin; Turkey	Carine Rocchesani; France
55 kg	Idoya Jiménez; Spain	Ayşegül Ergin; Turkey	Maria Zygmantovich; Belarus
60 kg	Jo-Anne Nash; Great Britain	Mirjam Muskens; Netherlands	Judith Pirchmoser; Austria
60 kg	Jo-Anne Nash; Great Britain	Mirjam Muskens; Netherlands	Sonja Schiedt; Germany
65 kg	Morfu Drosidou; Greece	Elena Benítez; Spain	Kirsimarja Koskinen; Finland
65 kg	Morfu Drosidou; Greece	Elena Benítez; Spain	Karin Schwartz; Denmark
70 kg	Tuğgen Gedik; Turkey	Iva Gavez; Croatia	Aikaterina Bassi; Greece
70 kg	Tuğgen Gedik; Turkey	Iva Gavez; Croatia	Tanja Brkic; Sweden
+70 kg	Yolanda García; Spain	Nataša Vezmar; Croatia	Karin Bain; Great Britain
+70 kg	Yolanda García; Spain	Nataša Vezmar; Croatia	Monique Thènes; France
