= 2018 World Cup Taekwondo Team Championships =

Taekwondo competition

2018 Taekwondo World Cup
- Venue: Zayed Sport Complex
- Location: Fujairah, United Arab Emirates
- Dates: 24–25 November 2018

Champions
- Men: Iran
- Women: China

The 2018 World Cup Taekwondo Team Championships was the 10th edition of the World Cup Taekwondo Team Championships, and was held in Fujairah, United Arab Emirates from November 24 to November 25, 2018.

== Medalists ==
Event	Gold	Silver	Bronze
Men	Iran; Soroush Ahmadi; Sina Bahrami; Mirhashem Hosseini; Mehdi Khodabakhshi; Abolfazl Yaghoubi	Russia; Dmitry Artyukhov; Anton Kotkov; Sarmat Tcakoev; Vladislav Yugay; Andrey Zemledeltsev	Azerbaijan; Milad Beigi; Payam Ghobadi; Radik Isayev; Gashim Magomedov; Mahammad Mammadov
Men	Iran; Soroush Ahmadi; Sina Bahrami; Mirhashem Hosseini; Mehdi Khodabakhshi; Abolfazl Yaghoubi	Russia; Dmitry Artyukhov; Anton Kotkov; Sarmat Tcakoev; Vladislav Yugay; Andrey Zemledeltsev	Kazakhstan; Rakhym Adilkhanov; Yerassyl Kaiyrbek; Nurlan Myrzabayev; Yeldos Yskak; Ruslan Zhaparov
Women	China; Luo Zongshi; Wenren Yuntao; Zhang Mengyu; Zheng Shuyin; Zhou Lijun	Ivory Coast; Bouma Coulibaly; Banassa Diomandé; Marie Frédérique Ekpitini; Ruth Gbagbi; Aminata Traoré	Russia; Olga Ivanova; Yulia Turutina; Yulia Zaitseva; Karina Zhdanova; Arina Zhivotkova
Women	China; Luo Zongshi; Wenren Yuntao; Zhang Mengyu; Zheng Shuyin; Zhou Lijun	Ivory Coast; Bouma Coulibaly; Banassa Diomandé; Marie Frédérique Ekpitini; Ruth Gbagbi; Aminata Traoré	France; Yasmina Aziez; Althéa Laurin; Haby Niaré; Estelle Vander-Zwalm; Magda Wiet-Hénin
Mixed	Russia; Kadyrbech Daurov; Yury Kirichenko; Ekaterina Derbeneva; Polina Khan	Turkey; Hasan Can Lazoğlu; Yunus Sarı; Sude Bulut; İkra Kayır	Kazakhstan; Kazybek Baktiyaruly; Smaiyl Duisebay; Fariza Aldangorova; Cansel Deniz
Mixed	Russia; Kadyrbech Daurov; Yury Kirichenko; Ekaterina Derbeneva; Polina Khan	Turkey; Hasan Can Lazoğlu; Yunus Sarı; Sude Bulut; İkra Kayır	Ivory Coast; Cheick Sallah Cissé; Lamine Sidibé; Marie Frédérique Ekpitini; Ruth Gbagbi

== Men ==
=== Preliminary round ===
==== Group A ====
Pos	Team	Pld	W	D	L	PF	PA	PD	Pts	RUS	KAZ	CIV	KOR
1	Russia	3	3	0	0	294	181	+113	9	—	75–33	107–58	112–90
2	Kazakhstan	3	1	1	1	125	167	−42	4	33–75	—	92–92	WO
3	Ivory Coast	3	1	1	1	150	199	−49	4	58–107	92–92	—	WO
4	South Korea	3	0	0	3	90	112	−22	0	90–112			—

Source: WT

==== Group B ====
Pos	Team	Pld	W	D	L	PF	PA	PD	Pts	IRI	AZE	UZB	CHN
1	Iran	3	3	0	0	165	139	+26	9	—	66–58	54–37	45–44
2	Azerbaijan	3	2	0	1	176	150	+26	6	58–66	—	55–38	63–46
3	Uzbekistan	3	1	0	2	172	177	−5	3	37–54	38–55	—	97–68
4	China	3	0	0	3	158	205	−47	0	44–45	46–63	68–97	—

Source: WT

=== Knockout round ===
Semifinals		Final
Russia	27
Azerbaijan	26	Russia	30
Kazakhstan	29	Iran	31
Iran	49

== Women ==
=== Preliminary round ===
==== Group A ====
Pos	Team	Pld	W	D	L	PF	PA	PD	Pts	CHN	CIV	KOR
1	China	2	2	0	0	56	42	+14	6	—	56–42	WO
2	Ivory Coast	2	1	0	1	94	102	−8	3	42–56	—	52–46
3	South Korea	2	0	0	2	46	52	−6	0		46–52	—

Source: WT

==== Group B ====
Pos	Team	Pld	W	D	L	PF	PA	PD	Pts	FRA	RUS	MAR
1	France	2	2	0	0	73	49	+24	6	—	34–32	39–17
2	Russia	2	1	0	1	77	51	+26	3	32–34	—	45–17
3	Morocco	2	0	0	2	34	84	−50	0	17–39	17–45	—

Source: WT

=== Knockout round ===
Semifinals		Final
China	WO
Russia		China	77
Ivory Coast	56	Ivory Coast	41
France	45

== Mixed ==
Quarterfinals
Morocco	16
Kazakhstan	27
Ivory Coast	WO
South Korea
Turkey	44
China	39

Semifinals
Russia	55
Kazakhstan	33
Ivory Coast	58
Turkey	72

Final
Russia	35
Turkey	22
