= Mona Solheim =

Norwegian taekwondo practitioner

Personal information
- Nationality: Norwegian
- Born: 4 August 1979 (age 46)

Sport
- Sport: Taekwondo
Medal record
Representing Norway
Women's taekwondo
World Championships
Bronze medal – third place	2007 Beijing	Lightweight

Mona Solheim (born 4 August 1979) is a Norwegian taekwondo practitioner.

== Biography ==
Solheim competed at the 1999, 2007, 2009 and 2011 World Taekwondo Championships. She won a bronze medal in lightweight at the 2007 World Taekwondo Championships in Beijing, after being defeated by eventual world champion Karine Sergerie in the semifinal.

She was awarded the Kongepokal (King's Cup) trophy at the national championships in 1998.

She is a sister of Nina Solheim. They were adopted from South Korea and grew up in Namsos Municipality in Norway.
