= Patricia Reynolds =

British maxillofacial surgeon

Patricia Reynolds is emeritus professor of dental education at King's College London. She was formerly a maxillofacial surgeon in the National Health Service and responsible for teaching oral surgery.
