= 2019 World Cup Taekwondo Team Championships =

Taekwondo competition

2019 Taekwondo World Cup
- Venue: Taihu International Expo Centre
- Location: Wuxi, China
- Dates: 23–25 August 2019

Champions
- Men: Iran
- Women: China

The 2019 World Cup Taekwondo Team Championships was the 11th edition of the World Cup Taekwondo Team Championships, and was held in Wuxi, China from August 23 to August 25, 2019.

The main bracket consisted of a single elimination tournament, culminating in the gold medal match. Two bronze medals were awarded at the competitions. A repechage was used to determine the bronze medal winners. Iran won the gold medal in men's competition while China won the remaining events.

== Medalists ==
| Event | Gold | Silver | Bronze |
|---|---|---|---|
| Men | Iran; Sina Bahrami; Amir Mohammad Bakhshi; Hossein Lotfi; Erfan Nazemi; Saeid Rajabi | South Korea; Bae Jun-seo; Kim Hyeon-seung; Kim Jee-seok; Park Woo-hyeok; Shin Dong-yun | Russia; Dmitry Artyukhov; Dali Ishberdin; Sarmat Tcakoev; Vladislav Yugay; Andrey Zemledeltsev |
| Men | Iran; Sina Bahrami; Amir Mohammad Bakhshi; Hossein Lotfi; Erfan Nazemi; Saeid Rajabi | South Korea; Bae Jun-seo; Kim Hyeon-seung; Kim Jee-seok; Park Woo-hyeok; Shin Dong-yun | China; Lin Wenye; Song Guodong; Song Zhaoxiang; Wang Jinyu; Zhao Xinbo |
| Women | China; Tan Xueqin; Wu Jingyu; Zhang Mengyu; Zheng Shuyin; Zhou Lijun | Russia; Anastasia Baklanova; Elena Evlampyeva; Polina Khan; Kristina Prokudina; Karina Zhdanova | South Korea; Ha Min-ah; Jo Hee-kyeong; Kim Da-yeong; Kim Yu-jin; Yoon Do-hee |
| Women | China; Tan Xueqin; Wu Jingyu; Zhang Mengyu; Zheng Shuyin; Zhou Lijun | Russia; Anastasia Baklanova; Elena Evlampyeva; Polina Khan; Kristina Prokudina; Karina Zhdanova | China; Luo Zongshi; Wang Huan; Wei Xiaojing; Zhou Zeqi; Zuo Ju |
| Mixed | China; Chen Linglong; Tang Hao; Gao Pan; Song Jie | Iran; Amir Mohammad Bakhshi; Erfan Nazemi; Kimia Alizadeh; Kimia Hemmati | Turkey; Hasan Can Lazoğlu; Yunus Sarı; Ayşe Asma; İkra Kayır |
| Mixed | China; Chen Linglong; Tang Hao; Gao Pan; Song Jie | Iran; Amir Mohammad Bakhshi; Erfan Nazemi; Kimia Alizadeh; Kimia Hemmati | Russia; Kadyrbech Daurov; Yury Kirichenko; Yulia Zaitseva; Arina Zhivotkova |

== Men ==
| Quarterfinals | | Semifinals | | Final |
| | | South Korea | 69 |
| Russia | 67 | Russia | 53 |
| United States | 25 | | | South Korea | 68 |
| Kazakhstan | 33 | | | Iran | 71 |
| Iran | 48 | Iran | 66 |
| China 2 | 74 | China 1 | 53 |
| China 1 | 78 |

Repechage
Kazakhstan | 67
China 2 | 70

Bronze medal contests
China 2 | 31
Russia | 69
United States | 47
China 1 | 121

== Women ==
| Quarterfinals | | Semifinals | | Final |
| | | China 1 | 56 |
| United States | 31 | South Korea | 27 |
| South Korea | 48 | | | China 1 | 34 |
| | | | | Russia | 30 |
| | | Russia | 42 |
| | | China 2 | 36 |

Bronze medal contests
Bye
South Korea
United States | 23
China 2 | 35

== Mixed ==
| Quarterfinals | | Semifinals | | Final |
| Russia | WO |
| United States | | Russia | 38 |
| Ivory Coast | 13 | Iran | 41 |
| Iran | 47 | | | Iran | 26 |
| Turkey | 37 | | | China | 50 |
| South Korea | 30 | Turkey | 48 |
| Japan | 18 | China | 83 |
| China | 132 |

Repechage
United States
Ivory Coast | WO
South Korea | WO
Japan

Bronze medal contests
Ivory Coast | 28
Turkey | 74
South Korea
Russia | WO
