= World Cup Taekwondo Team Championships =

Taekwondo competition

The World Cup Taekwondo Team Championships began in 2006, and is held every two years by World Taekwondo.

The participating male and female teams are divided into five groups each and the top four countries at the previous championship and the host country are seeded. Top five teams and three best-record teams among the second-placed teams in the men's and women's division of the preliminary round advance to the quarterfinal round. The quarterfinal, semifinal and final matches are conducted in a single elimination format.

== Summary ==
=== Men ===
| Year | Hosts | Champion | Score | Runner-up | Bronze medalists |
|---|---|---|---|---|---|
| 2006 | Bangkok, Thailand | South Korea | 3–2 | Iran | France |
| 2009 | Baku, Azerbaijan | Turkey | 3–2 | Iran | Azerbaijan and Russia |
| 2010 | Urumqi, China | Iran | 3–1 | Spain | South Korea and Turkey |
| 2012 | Santa Cruz, Aruba | South Korea | 27–13 | Iran | China and Spain |
| 2013 | Abidjan, Ivory Coast | Mexico | 17–11 | Ivory Coast | Russia and South Korea |
| 2014 | Querétaro, Mexico | Russia | 29–26 | Mexico | Iran and South Korea |
| 2015 | Mexico City, Mexico | Azerbaijan | 42–23 | Iran | Russia and South Korea |
| 2016 | Baku, Azerbaijan | Azerbaijan | 21–5 | South Korea | Belgium and Turkey |
| 2017 | Abidjan, Ivory Coast | Iran | 34–33 | Russia | Ivory Coast and South Korea |
| 2018 | Fujairah, United Arab Emirates | Iran | 31–30 | Russia | Azerbaijan and Kazakhstan |
| 2019 | Wuxi, China | Iran | 71–68 | South Korea | China and Russia |
| 2023 | Goyang, South Korea | Iran | 2–0 | Australia | Brazil |
| 2024 | Chuncheon, South Korea | Iran | 2–0 | South Korea | Morocco |
| 2025 | Chuncheon, South Korea | China | 2–0 | Kazakhstan | Thailand |
| 2026 | Chuncheon,South Korea | China | 2–0 | Kazakhstan | Thailand |

=== Women ===
| Year | Hosts | Champion | Score | Runner-up | Bronze medalists |
|---|---|---|---|---|---|
| 2006 | Bangkok, Thailand | South Korea | 3–2 | Turkey | China |
| 2009 | Baku, Azerbaijan | South Korea | 3–2 | Russia | Morocco and Turkey |
| 2010 | Urumqi, China | South Korea | 3–2 | China | Thailand and Turkey |
| 2012 | Santa Cruz, Aruba | China | 12–11 | France | Croatia and Russia |
| 2013 | Abidjan, Ivory Coast | South Korea | 12–9 | China | France and Ivory Coast |
| 2014 | Querétaro, Mexico | South Korea | 47–25 | Ivory Coast | China and France |
| 2015 | Mexico City, Mexico | China | 34–32 | Mexico | Chinese Taipei and South Korea |
| 2016 | Baku, Azerbaijan | China | 6–4 | South Korea | Russia and Turkey |
| 2017 | Abidjan, Ivory Coast | China | 49–42 | South Korea | Ivory Coast and Morocco |
| 2018 | Fujairah, United Arab Emirates | China | 77–41 | Ivory Coast | France and Russia |
| 2019 | Wuxi, China | China | 34–30 | Russia | China and South Korea |
| 2023 | Goyang, South Korea | South Korea | 2–0 | Morocco | China |
| 2024 | Chuncheon, South Korea | Iran | 2–1 | Morocco | South Korea |
| 2025 | Chuncheon,South Korea | South Korea | 2–0 | China | Morocco |
| 2026 | Chuncheon, South Korea | Morocco | 2–1 | Russia | Iran |

=== Mixed ===
| Year | Hosts | Champion | Score | Runner-up | Bronze medalists |
|---|---|---|---|---|---|
| 2016 | Baku, Azerbaijan | South Korea | 9–7 | Russia | Belgium and United States |
| 2017 | Abidjan, Ivory Coast | China | 57–55 | Russia | Mexico and South Korea |
| 2018 | Fujairah, United Arab Emirates | Russia | 35–22 | Turkey | Ivory Coast and Kazakhstan |
| 2019 | Wuxi, China | China | 50–26 | Iran | Russia and Turkey |
| 2023 | Goyang, South Korea | Brazil | 2–0 | Morocco | Iran |
| 2023 | Wuxi, China | China | 36–30 | Uzbekistan | Brazil and South Korea |
| 2024 | Chuncheon, South Korea | China | 2–1 | Iran | South Korea |
| 2024 | Wuxi, China | Brazil | 2–1 | China | Uzbekistan |
| 2025 | Chuncheon,South Korea | Uzbekistan | 2–0 | Morocco | South Korea |
| 2025 | Wuxi, China | Brazil | 2–1 | South Korea | China |
| 2026 | Chuncheon, South Korea | Iran | 2–0 | Russia | Kazakhstan and Thailand |

== Medal table ==
| Rank | Nation | Gold | Silver | Bronze | Total |
|---|---|---|---|---|---|
| 1 | China | 12 | 4 | 7 | 23 |
| 2 | South Korea | 9 | 6 | 12 | 27 |
| 3 | Iran | 8 | 6 | 3 | 17 |
| 4 | Brazil | 3 | 0 | 2 | 5 |
| 5 | Russia | 2 | 8 | 8 | 18 |
| 6 | Azerbaijan | 2 | 0 | 2 | 4 |
| 7 | Morocco | 1 | 4 | 3 | 8 |
| 8 | Turkey | 1 | 2 | 6 | 9 |
| 9 | Mexico | 1 | 2 | 1 | 4 |
| 10 | Uzbekistan | 1 | 1 | 1 | 3 |
| 11 | Ivory Coast | 0 | 3 | 4 | 7 |
| 12 | France | 0 | 1 | 4 | 5 |
| 13 | Kazakhstan | 0 | 1 | 3 | 4 |
| 14 | Spain | 0 | 1 | 1 | 2 |
| 15 | Australia | 0 | 1 | 0 | 1 |
| 16 | Thailand | 0 | 0 | 3 | 3 |
| 17 | Belgium | 0 | 0 | 2 | 2 |
| 18 | Chinese Taipei | 0 | 0 | 1 | 1 |
| 18 | Croatia | 0 | 0 | 1 | 1 |
| 18 | United States | 0 | 0 | 1 | 1 |
| Totals (20 entries) | | 40 | 40 | 65 | 145 |

== See also ==
- World Taekwondo Championships
