= Dong Mei =

Chinese architect

Dong Mei (东梅)
- Born: 1967 (age 58–59); China
- Occupation: Architect
- Spouse: Liu Xiaochuan
- Awards: 2020 Royal Academy Dorfman Award
- Website: http://www.a-bckj.com/enterprise.html

Dong Mei (东梅) is a Chinese architect and the co-founder and director of the firm, BCKJ (Biechu Kongjian Architects). She is well-known for both her design work and her contribution to academic research. In 2020, Dong Mei and her husband gained international recognition from the 2020 Royal Academy Dorfman Award.

== Early life and education ==
Dong Mei was born in China in 1967. She was accepted into the Department of Architecture at Southeast University (SEU) in 1985 and graduated in 1989 with a degree in architecture. After her time in post-secondary, she began work at the Beijing Residential Architectural Design Institute as a junior engineer and then later being prompted to a senior engineer position.

== Career and achievements ==
=== BCKJ Architects ===
Dong Mei co-founded BCKJ Architects (Biechu Kongjian Architects) with her husband, Liu Xiaochuan in 2004. The office consists of less than 10 people working on a wide range of projects from residences, offices, and schools to museums, parks, and stadiums. As a team, both Dong Mei and Liu Xiaochuan have gained recognition through the Royal Academy Dorfman Award, which they received in 2020.

=== Sustainability ===
Dong Mei is driven by the ethos of “symbiosis with the environment” and creates work that is recognized by the jury chair of the Royal Academy Dorfman Award as work that focuses on community, cultural heritage, and nature. Dong Mei has been one to spearhead architecture with sustainable values before the importance of green building was recognized. In the past, the building and construction sector in China prioritized economy and efficiency, often using industrialized products for rapid urbanization and did not consider the local vernacular. Despite that, Dong Mei worked with energy conservation and environmental protection as the core focus of the design approaches, with much of the research going into “simplifying building volumes [and] improving natural ventilation,” – concepts drawn from passive housing principles.

== Other achievements ==
=== Patents received in China ===
- January 2015 – Patent for “Ecological toilet”; patent publication number: CN204081558U
- January 2015 – Patent for "Rainwater collection gravity toilet flushing device"; patent publication number: CN204080921U
- September 2015 – Patent for "Compressed Wheat Bundle Brick and Compressed Wheat Bundle Brick Wall"; patent publication number: CN204645307U

== Major works ==
=== Clove Valley ECO-Hotel (2019) ===
A hotel complex designed prioritizing nature by leaving minimal impact and disruption through the consideration of habitat preservation and making space for natural processes such as rainwater movement and vegetation growth. The buildings are made of lightweight material and incorporates sustainable building technologies such biomass and solar energy, cross ventilation, passive thermal insulation, and waste water treatment.

=== Badaling Forest Experience Center (2014) ===
Designed with respect to nature, the project encompasses the human as a part of nature and blends the built form into the environment. The project considers factors of lightweight and recyclable materials, space for habitat growth and preservation, and green building principles such as sufficient thermal insulation and solar energy.

=== Polus International College Students Apartment (2014) ===
An student housing project that utilizes corridors and courtyards to connect living spaces to provide a place for community building amongst students. The 19 public spaces are intended for social interaction and self-discipline, with one of them being a vegetable garden tended to by the students. With the predicted decline in the student population, the apartments are designed with the ability to be transformed into senior housing in the future.

=== Black Tiger Primary School (2010) ===
As reconstruction project following the 2008 Sichuan earthquake, the design uses local materials and traditional building methods to provide a place for learning. Despite the limited funding from the government, the building is recognized for representing the Qiang people culture while working with modern sustainable materials in creating a place that reconnects the local people to their surrounding context.

== Other works ==
- Turning the Corner, Have a Smile (牡丹园里寻牡丹), Beijing, China (2021)
- Clove Valley ECO-Hotel (丁香谷生态酒店), Yangqing District, China (2019)
- Bookstore in the Forest (青龙谷书吧), Beijing, China (2018)
- Home in the forest (森林之家), Beijing, China (2018)
- Engrossing Room (潜心小舍), Beijing, China (2016)
- Activity Center of Xiaolongshan Natural Resources and Environmental Protection Association (小陇山自然资源与环境保护协会活动中心), Tianshui, China (2015)
- Wuhan Qingchuan College (武汉晴川学院), Wuhan, China (2015)
- Badaling Forest Experience Hall (八达岭森林体验馆), Yanqing, Beijing (2014)
- Gates on the Bridge (桥上的大门) – Entrance of Beijing Songshan National Nature Reserve, Beijing, China (2014)
- Hang Xing Technology Center (航星技术中心), Beijing, China (2012)
- Renovation of the Courtyard of No. 38 BaoChao Hutong (宝钞胡同38号四合院改造), Beijing, China (2012)
- Yongyou No.5 R&D Center (用友软件5#研发中心), Beijing, China (2007)
- Public Classroom Building of Peking University (Second Classroom Building) (北京大学公共教室楼 (北大二教)), Beijing, China (2007)
- Renovation of Yuyuantan Office (玉渊潭办公室改造), Beijing, China (2003)
- Peking University Nongyuan Canteen (北大农园食堂), Beijing, China (2002)

== Awards ==
- 2020 – The Royal Academy Dorfman Award, London, UK
