= Cihat Kutluca =

Turkish taekwondo practitioner

Personal information
- Nationality: Turkish
- Born: 14 March 1971 (age 55) Turkey
- Weight: 50–54 kg (110–119 lb) (flyweight)

Sport
- Country: Turkey
- Sport: Taekwondo
Medal record
Men's taekwondo
Representing Turkey
World Taekwondo Championships
Gold medal – first place	1995 Manila	54 kg
European Taekwondo Championships
Silver medal – second place	1990 Aarhus	50 kg
Silver medal – second place	1994 Zagreb	54 kg

Cihat Kutluca (born 14 March 1971) is a Turkish former national taekwondo athlete. He is a world and European medalist, and won the gold medal at the 1995 World Taekwondo Championships.

== Career ==
Kutluca began taekwondo in 1975 and soon made a name for himself nationally. In 1988, he won the gold medal in the junior category at the Liège Open in Belgium, and in 1989, he won gold in the senior category at the Mechelen Open. He became Turkish national champion multiple times and was selected for the national team in the late 1980s.

At the 1990 European Taekwondo Championships held in Aarhus, Denmark, he won the silver medal in the –50 kg category. He earned another silver at the 1994 European Taekwondo Championships in Zagreb, Croatia, in the –54 kg division.

His greatest achievement came at the 1995 World Taekwondo Championships in Manila, Philippines, where he became world champion in the –54 kg category, defeating Iran's Mehrdad Rokni in the final.

After retiring from active competition, Kutluca worked as a coach for the national team and trained young athletes at various sports clubs. He has made significant contributions to the development of taekwondo in Turkey.
