= Serpil Gür =

Turkish taekwondo practitioner

Sport
- Country: Turkey
- Sport: Taekwondo
Medal record
Women's taekwondo
Representing Turkey
European Championships
Gold medal – first place	1990 Århus	–47 kg

Serpil Gür is a Turkish taekwondo practitioner. She competed at the 1990 European Taekwondo Championships, winning the gold medal in the -47 kg event.
