= 2013 World Cup Taekwondo Team Championships =

Taekwondo competition

2013 Taekwondo World Cup
- Venue: Palais des Sports de Treichville
- Location: Abidjan, Ivory Coast
- Dates: 28–30 November 2013

Champions
- Men: Mexico
- Women: South Korea

The 2013 World Cup Taekwondo Team Championships was the 5th edition of the World Cup Taekwondo Team Championships, and was held in Abidjan, Ivory Coast from November 28 to November 30, 2013.

== Medalists ==
Event	Gold	Silver	Bronze
Men	Mexico; Uriel Adriano; Elías González; Saúl Gutiérrez; Idulio Islas; René Lizárraga; Abel Mendoza; Hugo Palacios	Ivory Coast; Cheick Sallah Cissé; Seydou Gbané; Anicet Kassi; Georges Kobenan; Peken Logbo; Wasiu Tadjou	South Korea; Han Yong-min; Kim Jae-hyeong; Lee Chang-min; Lee Ho-hyeong; Lee Jong-seung; Lee Sang-je; Park Chang-jun; Park Hyeon-jun
Men	Mexico; Uriel Adriano; Elías González; Saúl Gutiérrez; Idulio Islas; René Lizárraga; Abel Mendoza; Hugo Palacios	Ivory Coast; Cheick Sallah Cissé; Seydou Gbané; Anicet Kassi; Georges Kobenan; Peken Logbo; Wasiu Tadjou	Russia; Aleksey Denisenko; Albert Gaun; Vladimir Kim; Anton Kotkov; Konstantin Minin; Vasily Nikitin
Women	South Korea; Cho Hye-rin; Ha Ji-youn; Hwang Kyung-seon; Kim Jae-ah; Kim Ji-na; Kim Jin-kyung; Kim Mi-kyung; Kwon Eun-kyung; Oh Hye-ri; Park Hye-mi	China; Feng Xiao; Hou Yuzhuo; Li Donghua; Li Zhaoyi; Liu Liping; Wang Yun; Wu Jingyu; Zhang Hua; Zheng Shuyin	France; Yasmina Aziez; Floriane Liborio; Maéva Mellier; Hajer Mustapha; Haby Niaré; Estelle Vander-Zwalm; Magda Wiet-Hénin
Women	South Korea; Cho Hye-rin; Ha Ji-youn; Hwang Kyung-seon; Kim Jae-ah; Kim Ji-na; Kim Jin-kyung; Kim Mi-kyung; Kwon Eun-kyung; Oh Hye-ri; Park Hye-mi	China; Feng Xiao; Hou Yuzhuo; Li Donghua; Li Zhaoyi; Liu Liping; Wang Yun; Wu Jingyu; Zhang Hua; Zheng Shuyin	Ivory Coast; Banassa Diomandé; Ruth Gbagbi; Larissa Konan; Mamina Koné; Nadège N'Dri; Awa Ouattara; Sita Sanogo

== Men ==
=== Preliminary round ===
==== Group A ====
Pos	Team	Pld	W	D	L	PF	PA	PD	Pts	MEX	CHN	FRA	ESP
1	Mexico	3	2	1	0	74	58	+16	5	—	16–16	30–21	28–21
2	China	3	2	1	0	59	51	+8	5	16–16	—	22–15	21–20
3	France	3	1	0	2	52	67	−15	2	21–30	15–22	—	16–15
4	Spain	3	0	0	3	56	65	−9	0	21–28	20–21	15–16	—

Source: Mas Taekwondo

==== Group B ====
Pos	Team	Pld	W	D	L	PF	PA	PD	Pts	RUS	USA	GAB	BUR
1	Russia	3	3	0	0	76	23	+53	6	—	18–10	23–8	35–5
2	United States	3	2	0	1	68	33	+35	4	10–18	—	24–11	34–4
3	Gabon	3	1	0	2	37	54	−17	2	8–23	11–24	—	18–7
4	Burkina Faso	3	0	0	3	16	87	−71	0	5–35	4–34	7–18	—

Source: Mas Taekwondo

==== Group C ====
Pos	Team	Pld	W	D	L	PF	PA	PD	Pts	KOR	SEN	COD
1	South Korea	2	1	1	0	63	42	+21	3	—	25–25	38–17
2	Senegal	2	1	1	0	61	45	+16	3	25–25	—	36–20
3	Congo DR	2	0	0	2	37	74	−37	0	17–38	20–36	—

Source: Mas Taekwondo

==== Group D ====
Pos	Team	Pld	W	D	L	PF	PA	PD	Pts	CIV	BRA	NGR
1	Ivory Coast	2	2	0	0	53	24	+29	4	—	30–13	23–11
2	Brazil	2	1	0	1	23	39	−16	2	13–30	—	10–9
3	Nigeria	2	0	0	2	20	33	−13	0	11–23	9–10	—

Source: Mas Taekwondo

=== Knockout round ===
Quarterfinals		Semifinals		Final
Mexico	24
Brazil	21	Mexico	9
South Korea	14	South Korea	8
United States	11			Mexico	17
Russia	39			Ivory Coast	11
Senegal	9	Russia	16
Ivory Coast	17	Ivory Coast	17
China	15

== Women ==
=== Preliminary round ===
==== Group A ====
Pos	Team	Pld	W	D	L	PF	PA	PD	Pts	KOR	CIV	ESP	USA
1	South Korea	3	3	0	0	81	31	+50	6	—	28–3	31–16	22–12
2	Ivory Coast	3	2	0	1	31	51	−20	4	3–28	—	11–9	17–14
3	Spain	3	1	0	2	50	54	−4	2	16–31	9–11	—	25–12
4	United States	3	0	0	3	38	64	−26	0	12–22	14–17	12–25	—

Source: Mas Taekwondo

==== Group B ====
Pos	Team	Pld	W	D	L	PF	PA	PD	Pts	CHN	FRA	RUS	MLI
1	China	3	3	0	0	56	20	+36	6	—	11–8	10–8	35–4
2	France	3	2	0	1	35	26	+9	4	8–11	—	17–14	10–1
3	Russia	3	1	0	2	45	30	+15	2	8–10	14–17	—	23–3
4	Mali	3	0	0	3	8	68	−60	0	4–35	1–10	3–23	—

Source: Mas Taekwondo

=== Knockout round ===
Semifinals		Final
South Korea	17
France	12	South Korea	12
Ivory Coast	9	China	9
China	17
