= Arzu Ceylan =

Turkish taekwondo practitioner

Behice Arzu Ceylan
Personal information
- Nationality: Turkish
- Born: Sydney, Australia

Sport
- Country: Turkey
- Sport: Taekwondo
- Event: Finweight
Medal record
Women's Taekwondo
Representing Turkey
European Championships
Gold medal – first place	1990 Aarhus	Finweight

Behice Arzu Ceylan is a female, Turkish, former European champion Taekwondo practitioner.

== Achievements ==
- (gold) 1990 European Championships - Aarhus, Denmark -43 kg

== Honors ==
- Milliyet Sports Awards 1990 Turkish Athlete of The Year
