= 2017 World Cup Taekwondo Team Championships =

Taekwondo competition

2017 Taekwondo World Cup
- Venue: Palais des Sports de Treichville
- Location: Abidjan, Ivory Coast
- Dates: 5–6 December 2017

Champions
- Men: Iran
- Women: China

The 2017 World Cup Taekwondo Team Championships was the 9th edition of the World Cup Taekwondo Team Championships, and was held in Abidjan, Ivory Coast from December 5 to December 6, 2017.

Teams were allowed to augment their squads with maximum two athletes from other countries.

== Medalists ==
Event	Gold	Silver	Bronze
Men	Iran; Soroush Ahmadi; Hossein Ehsani; Mehdi Khodabakhshi; Erfan Nazemi; Saeid Rajabi; Hadi Tiran	Russia; Aleksey Denisenko; Bolat Izutdinov; Maksim Khramtsov; Vladislav Larin; Konstantin Minin; Vladislav Yugay	Ivory Coast; Seydou Gbané; Anicet Kassi; Georges Kobenan; Peken Logbo; Lamine Sidibé; Sodiki Tadjou
Men	Iran; Soroush Ahmadi; Hossein Ehsani; Mehdi Khodabakhshi; Erfan Nazemi; Saeid Rajabi; Hadi Tiran	Russia; Aleksey Denisenko; Bolat Izutdinov; Maksim Khramtsov; Vladislav Larin; Konstantin Minin; Vladislav Yugay	South Korea; Hwan Nam-goong; In Kyo-don; Jeong Yun-jo; Kim Hun; Noh Min-woo; Shin Dong-yun
Women	China; Gao Pan; Liu Kaiqi; Wenren Yuntao; Zhang Mengyu; Zheng Shuyin; Zhou Lijun	South Korea; An Sae-bom; Ha Min-ah; Jang You-jin; Kim Hwi-lang; Lee Ah-reum; Sim Jae-young	Morocco; Wiam Dislam; Soukayna El-Aouni; Oumaima El-Bouchti; Chaimae Kriem; Nada Laaraj
Women	China; Gao Pan; Liu Kaiqi; Wenren Yuntao; Zhang Mengyu; Zheng Shuyin; Zhou Lijun	South Korea; An Sae-bom; Ha Min-ah; Jang You-jin; Kim Hwi-lang; Lee Ah-reum; Sim Jae-young	Ivory Coast; Bouma Coulibaly; Banassa Diomandé; Ruth Gbagbi; Mamina Koné; Awa Ouattara; Aminata Traoré
Mixed	China; Peng Zhaojie; Tian Jian; Gao Pan; Zhang Mengyu	Russia; Anton Kotkov; Konstantin Minin; Alina Ikaeva; Karina Zhdanova	South Korea; In Kyo-don; Noh Min-woo; An Sae-bom; Kim Hwi-lang
Mixed	China; Peng Zhaojie; Tian Jian; Gao Pan; Zhang Mengyu	Russia; Anton Kotkov; Konstantin Minin; Alina Ikaeva; Karina Zhdanova	Mexico; Rubén Nava; Bryan Salazar; Aziza Chambers; Sanaz Shahbazi

- Foreign athletes are shown in italic.

== Men ==
=== Preliminary round ===
==== Group A ====
Pos	Team	Pld	W	D	L	PF	PA	PD	Pts	RUS	KOR	MAR	TPE
1	Russia	3	3	0	0	154	125	+29	9	—	52–47	38–33	64–45
2	South Korea	3	2	0	1	173	139	+34	6	47–52	—	83–50	43–37
3	Morocco	3	1	0	2	136	171	−35	3	33–38	50–83	—	53–50
4	Chinese Taipei	3	0	0	3	132	160	−28	0	45–64	37–43	50–53	—

Source: WT

==== Group B ====
Pos	Team	Pld	W	D	L	PF	PA	PD	Pts	IRI	CIV	NIG	CHN
1	Iran	3	3	0	0	95	65	+30	9	—	WO	37–14	58–51
2	Ivory Coast	3	2	0	1	106	76	+30	6		—	73–44	33–32
3	Niger	3	1	0	2	120	165	−45	3	14–37	44–73	—	62–55
4	China	3	0	0	3	138	153	−15	0	51–58	32–33	55–62	—

Source: WT

=== Knockout round ===
Semifinals		Final
Russia	73
Ivory Coast	44	Russia	33
South Korea	39	Iran	34
Iran	55

== Women ==
=== Preliminary round ===
Pos	Team	Pld	W	D	L	PF	PA	PD	Pts	CHN	KOR	MAR	CIV	USA
1	China	4	4	0	0	193	107	+86	12	—	46–41	37–17	57–36	53–13
2	South Korea	4	3	0	1	174	110	+64	9	41–46	—	38–19	48–23	47–22
3	Morocco	4	2	0	2	110	129	−19	6	17–37	19–38	—	45–28	29–26
4	Ivory Coast	4	1	0	3	152	180	−28	3	36–57	23–48	28–45	—	65–30
5	United States	4	0	0	4	91	194	−103	0	13–53	22–47	26–29	30–65	—

Source: WT

=== Final ===
Final
China	49
South Korea	42

== Mixed ==
Quarterfinals		Semifinals		Final
		South Korea	43
Morocco	22	China	54
China	28			China	57
				Russia	55
		Mexico	27
		Russia	67
