= Sibel Dinçer =

Turkish taekwondo practitioner

Sport
- Country: Turkey
- Sport: Taekwondo
Medal record
Women's taekwondo
Representing Turkey
European Championships
Gold medal – first place	1988 Ankara	–60 kg
Bronze medal – third place	1990 Århus	–55 kg

Sibel Dinçer is a Turkish taekwondo practitioner. She competed at the 1988 European Taekwondo Championships, winning the gold medal in the -60 kg event. She also competed at the 1990 European Taekwondo Championships, winning the bronze medal in the -55 kg event.
