= Said Guliyev =

Azerbaijani taekwondo practitioner

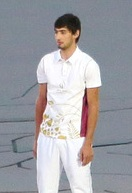

Medal record

Men's taekwondo

Representing Azerbaijan

Youth Olympics
Gold medal – first place	2014 Nanjing	73 kg

Youth World Championships
Silver medal – second place	2014 Taipai	73 kg

Universiade
Bronze medal – third place	2017 Taipei	74 kg

Said Guliyev (Azerbaijani: Səid Quliyev; born 19 July 1993) is an Azerbaijani taekwondo practitioner. He received a gold medal at the 2014 Summer Youth Olympics, held in Nanjing, China. He also won silver at 2014 Youth World Championships in Taipai.
