= Zhang Hua (taekwondo) =

Chinese taekwondo practitioner

Personal information
- Nationality: Chinese
- Born: 18 October 1990 (age 35)

Sport
- Sport: Taekwondo
Medal record
Representing China
Women's taekwondo
World Championships
Silver medal – second place	2009 Copenhagen	Lightweight
Asian Championships
Gold medal – first place	2012 Ho Chi Minh City	-62 kg
Gold medal – first place	2014 Tashkent	-67 kg
Asian Games
Silver medal – second place	2014 Incheon	-62 kg

Zhang Hua (born 18 October 1990) is a Chinese taekwondo practitioner.

She won a silver medal in lightweight at the 2009 World Taekwondo Championships, after being defeated by Lim Su-jeong in the final. She won gold medals at the 2012 and 2014 Asian Taekwondo Championships, and a silver medal at the 2014 Asian Games.
