= 2015 World Taekwondo Championships – Women's flyweight =

Taekwondo competition

Women's flyweight at the 2015 World Championships
- Venue: Traktor Ice Arena
- Dates: 13–14 May 2015
- Competitors: 54 from 54 nations

Medalists
gold medal	Ha Min-ah	South Korea
silver medal	Wu Jingyu	China
bronze medal	Svetlana Igumenova	Russia
bronze medal	Tijana Bogdanović	Serbia

The women's flyweight was a competition featured at the 2015 World Taekwondo Championships, and was held at the Traktor Ice Arena in Chelyabinsk, Russia on May 13 and 14 2015. Flyweights were limited to a maximum of 49 kilograms in body mass.

== Results ==
Legend

- DQ — Won by disqualification

=== Finals ===
Semifinals		Final
Wu Jingyu (CHN)	10
Svetlana Igumenova (RUS)	1	Wu Jingyu (CHN)	3
Ha Min-ah (KOR)	7	Ha Min-ah (KOR)	4
Tijana Bogdanović (SRB)	5

=== Top half ===
==== Section 1 ====
Round of 64
Maria Andrade (CPV)	6
Keshena Waterford (AUS)	10
Ivett Gonda (HUN)	5
Natalia Moka (GRE)	0
~~Hanitra Rakotondrasoa (MAD)~~
Wu Jingyu (CHN)	DQ
Tanja Pasanen (FIN)	0
Charlie Maddock (GBR)	10
Miyu Yamada (JPN)	DQ
~~Nur Dhia Liyana (MAS)~~

Round of 32
Lucija Zaninović (CRO)	12
Keshena Waterford (AUS)	0
Ivett Gonda (HUN)	0
Wu Jingyu (CHN)	14
Charlotte Craig (USA)	4
Charlie Maddock (GBR)	5
Miyu Yamada (JPN)	5
Itzel Manjarrez (MEX)	3

Round of 16
Lucija Zaninović (CRO)	2
Wu Jingyu (CHN)	9
Charlie Maddock (GBR)	6
Miyu Yamada (JPN)	4

Quarterfinals
Wu Jingyu (CHN)	15
Charlie Maddock (GBR)	0

==== Section 2 ====
Round of 64
Anouk Doria (MON)	15
Thabile Manyatsi (SWZ)	1
Rosa Keleku (COD)	6
Inese Tarvida (LAT)	13
Luisa Rosa (TLS)	4
Julissa Diez Canseco (PER)	6
Ganna Soroka (UKR)	0
Soukaina Sahib (MAR)	1
Anargul Sabyr (KAZ)	1
Patimat Abakarova (AZE)	3
Zura Mushambokazi (RWA)	DQ
~~Somaeh Gholami (AFG)~~

Round of 32
Chanatip Sonkham (THA)	18
Anouk Doria (MON)	1
Inese Tarvida (LAT)	2
Julissa Diez Canseco (PER)	4
Soukaina Sahib (MAR)	2
Patimat Abakarova (AZE)	7
Zura Mushambokazi (RWA)	7
Svetlana Igumenova (RUS)	15

Round of 16
Chanatip Sonkham (THA)	9
Julissa Diez Canseco (PER)	15
Patimat Abakarova (AZE)	2
Svetlana Igumenova (RUS)	4

Quarterfinals
Julissa Diez Canseco (PER)	2
Svetlana Igumenova (RUS)	3

=== Bottom half ===
==== Section 3 ====
Round of 64
~~Samia Eid (SUD)~~
Camille Dallaire-Leblanc (CAN)	DQ
Sun Huei-ning (TPE)	0
Ha Min-ah (KOR)	2
~~Candelaria Marte (DOM)~~
Elizabeth Zamora (GUA)	DQ
Dana Haidar (JOR)	12
Nilza Karina Reis (ANG)	2
Irene Pasiouli (CYP)	10
Sarah Malykke (DEN)	13
Ronna Ilao (PHI)	5
Monica Pimentel (ARU)	7

Round of 32
Brigitte Yagüe (ESP)	7
Camille Dallaire-Leblanc (CAN)	0
Ha Min-ah (KOR)	9
Elizabeth Zamora (GUA)	3
Dana Haidar (JOR)	15
Sarah Malykke (DEN)	7
Monica Pimentel (ARU)	5
Nour Abdelsalam (EGY)	6

Round of 16
Brigitte Yagüe (ESP)	3
Ha Min-ah (KOR)	4
Dana Haidar (JOR)	3
Nour Abdelsalam (EGY)	2

Quarterfinals
Ha Min-ah (KOR)	6
Dana Haidar (JOR)	2

==== Section 4 ====
Round of 64
Victoria Stambaugh (PUR)	3
Francisca Ríos (CHI)	14
Erica Nicoli (ITA)	8
Yania Aguirre (CUB)	6
Ibeth Rodríguez (COL)	3
Vanessa Alvarado (HON)	2
Ana Petrušić (SLO)	1
Talisca Reis (BRA)	0
Cyriesse Hall (JAM)	4
Nguyễn Thị Uyên (VIE)	3

Round of 32
Rukiye Yıldırım (TUR)	8
Francisca Ríos (CHI)	2
Erica Nicoli (ITA)	8
Tijana Bogdanović (SRB)	11
Ibeth Rodríguez (COL)	9
Ana Petrušić (SLO)	6
Cyriesse Hall (JAM)	1
Yasmina Aziez (FRA)	2

Round of 16
Rukiye Yıldırım (TUR)	1
Tijana Bogdanović (SRB)	4
Ibeth Rodríguez (COL)	1
Yasmina Aziez (FRA)	4

Quarterfinals
Tijana Bogdanović (SRB)	4
Yasmina Aziez (FRA)	1
