= 2015 World Taekwondo Championships – Women's finweight =

Taekwondo competition

Women's finweight at the 2015 World Championships
- Venue: Traktor Ice Arena
- Dates: 12–13 May 2015
- Competitors: 40 from 39 nations

Medalists
gold medal	Panipak Wongpattanakit	Thailand
silver medal	Iryna Romoldanova	Ukraine
bronze medal	Lin Wan-ting	Chinese Taipei
bronze medal	Iris Sing	Brazil

The women's finweight competition of the 2015 World Taekwondo Championships was held at the Traktor Ice Arena in Chelyabinsk, Russia, on May 12 and May 13. Finweights were limited to a maximum of 46 kilograms in body mass.

== Results ==
Legend

- DQ — Won by disqualification

=== Finals ===
Semifinals		Final
Iryna Romoldanova (UKR)	1
Lin Wan-ting (TPE)	0	Iryna Romoldanova (UKR)	5
Iris Sing (BRA)	4	Panipak Wongpattanakit (THA)	5
Panipak Wongpattanakit (THA)	8

=== Top half ===
==== Section 1 ====
Round of 64
~~Felana Razafinimanana (MAD)~~
Raneem Afifi (EGY)	DQ
Lam Siu Wai (HKG)	DQ
~~Mashaer Abdalla (SUD)~~

Round of 32
Kyriaki Kouttouki (CYP)	4
Raneem Afifi (EGY)	0
Virginia Dellán (VEN)	DQ
~~Luz Yeimy Cárdenas (COL)~~
Ana Oliván (MEX)	6
Trương Thị Kim Tuyền (VIE)	12
Lam Siu Wai (HKG)	0
Iryna Romoldanova (UKR)	15

Round of 16
Kyriaki Kouttouki (CYP)	13
Virginia Dellán (VEN)	2
Trương Thị Kim Tuyền (VIE)	4
Iryna Romoldanova (UKR)	5

Quarterfinals
Kyriaki Kouttouki (CYP)	0
Iryna Romoldanova (UKR)	5

==== Section 2 ====
Round of 64
Yuna Matsui (JPN)	13
Deanna Kyriazopoulos (AUS)	2
~~Ceren Ozbek (AZE)~~
Vijaya M. Dudhani (IND)	DQ

Round of 32
Lin Wan-ting (TPE)	10
Yuna Matsui (JPN)	1
Ayşe Yıldız (TUR)	2
Ioanna Koutsou (GRE)	1
Kelsey Junious (USA)	12
Charlotte Bjelke (DEN)	2
Vijaya M. Dudhani (IND)	2
Maria Smirnova (RUS)	10

Round of 16
Lin Wan-ting (TPE)	5
Ayşe Yıldız (TUR)	3
Kelsey Junious (USA)	7
Maria Smirnova (RUS)	11

Quarterfinals
Lin Wan-ting (TPE)	2
Maria Smirnova (RUS)	2

=== Bottom half ===
==== Section 3 ====
Round of 64
~~Acacia Aggarwal (KEN)~~
Claudia Lipcsei (HUN)	DQ
Li Zhaoyi (CHN)	5
Zhazira Saparbek (KAZ)	0

Round of 32
Iris Sing (BRA)	2
Claudia Lipcsei (HUN)	1
Sim Jae-young (KOR)	6
Mateja Kunović (CRO)	2
Elaia Torrontegui (ESP)	8
Giuliana Federici (GER)	10
Li Zhaoyi (CHN)	11
Hajer Mustapha (FRA)	1

Round of 16
Iris Sing (BRA)	5
Sim Jae-young (KOR)	3
Giuliana Federici (GER)	2
Li Zhaoyi (CHN)	8

Quarterfinals
Iris Sing (BRA)	1
Li Zhaoyi (CHN)	0

==== Section 4 ====
Round of 64
Rorisang Tlhakole (BOT)	0
Delphine Uwababyeyi (RWA)	8
~~Shakila Dharshini (MAS)~~
Samdansürengiin Yanjinlkham (MGL)	DQ

Round of 32
Fadia Farhani (TUN)	6
Delphine Uwababyeyi (RWA)	1
Thea Bermejo (PHI)	3
Panipak Wongpattanakit (THA)	19
Anneleen Goffin (WTF)	DQ
~~Parker Bolili (COD)~~
Samdansürengiin Yanjinlkham (MGL)	5
Yvette Yong (CAN)	4

Round of 16
Fadia Farhani (TUN)	1
Panipak Wongpattanakit (THA)	3
Anneleen Goffin (WTF)	0
Samdansürengiin Yanjinlkham (MGL)	13

Quarterfinals
Panipak Wongpattanakit (THA)	8
Samdansürengiin Yanjinlkham (MGL)	1
