= Pakistan at the 2010 Summer Youth Olympics =

- IOC code: PAK
- NOC: Pakistan Olympic Association

in Singapore
- Competitors: 19 in 4 sports
- Flag bearer: Syed Kashif Shah
- Medals Ranked 74th: Gold 0 Silver 1 Bronze 0 Total 1

Summer Youth Olympics appearances
- 2010; 2014; 2018; 2026

Pakistan participated at the inaugural 2010 Summer Youth Olympics in Singapore. The boys' hockey team secured the country's first-ever Youth Olympic medal, winning silver after a 1–2 defeat to Australia in the final.

== Medalists ==
Medal	Name	Sport	Event	Date
Silver	Pakistani Boys' Field Hockey team: Mazhar Abbas; Muhammad Adnan; Muhammad Sultan Amir; Muhammad Amir Ashiq; Muhammad Usman Aslam; Ali Hassan Faraz; Muhammad Irfan; Muhammad Arslan Qadir; Muhammad Rizwan; Syed Kashif Shah; Adnan Shakoor; Ali Shan; Muhammad Sohaib; Muhammad Suleman; Muhammad Umair; Ahmed Zubair	Field hockey	Boys' tournament	25 Aug

== Field hockey ==
Squad List	Event	Group Stage		Final	
Squad List	Event	Opposition Score	Rank	Opposition Score	Rank
Mazhar Abbas; Ahmed Zubair; Muhammad Sultan Amir; Muhammad Umair; Ali Shan; Muhammad Usman Aslam; Muhammad Adnan; Muhammad Rizwan; Muhammad Sohaib; Kashif Shah (C); Arslan Qadir; Ali Hassan Faraz; Muhammad Amir Ashiq; Muhammad Suleman; Adnan Shakoor; Muhammad Irfan	Boys' Hockey	Ghana; W 6-3	2	Australia; L 1-2	Silver medal
Mazhar Abbas; Ahmed Zubair; Muhammad Sultan Amir; Muhammad Umair; Ali Shan; Muhammad Usman Aslam; Muhammad Adnan; Muhammad Rizwan; Muhammad Sohaib; Kashif Shah (C); Arslan Qadir; Ali Hassan Faraz; Muhammad Amir Ashiq; Muhammad Suleman; Adnan Shakoor; Muhammad Irfan	Boys' Hockey	Chile; W 15-1	2	Australia; L 1-2	Silver medal
Mazhar Abbas; Ahmed Zubair; Muhammad Sultan Amir; Muhammad Umair; Ali Shan; Muhammad Usman Aslam; Muhammad Adnan; Muhammad Rizwan; Muhammad Sohaib; Kashif Shah (C); Arslan Qadir; Ali Hassan Faraz; Muhammad Amir Ashiq; Muhammad Suleman; Adnan Shakoor; Muhammad Irfan	Boys' Hockey	Singapore; W 4-1	2	Australia; L 1-2	Silver medal
Mazhar Abbas; Ahmed Zubair; Muhammad Sultan Amir; Muhammad Umair; Ali Shan; Muhammad Usman Aslam; Muhammad Adnan; Muhammad Rizwan; Muhammad Sohaib; Kashif Shah (C); Arslan Qadir; Ali Hassan Faraz; Muhammad Amir Ashiq; Muhammad Suleman; Adnan Shakoor; Muhammad Irfan	Boys' Hockey	Australia; L 2-5	2	Australia; L 1-2	Silver medal
Mazhar Abbas; Ahmed Zubair; Muhammad Sultan Amir; Muhammad Umair; Ali Shan; Muhammad Usman Aslam; Muhammad Adnan; Muhammad Rizwan; Muhammad Sohaib; Kashif Shah (C); Arslan Qadir; Ali Hassan Faraz; Muhammad Amir Ashiq; Muhammad Suleman; Adnan Shakoor; Muhammad Irfan	Boys' Hockey	Belgium; W 3-2	2	Australia; L 1-2	Silver medal

== Swimming ==
Athletes	Event	Heat		Semifinal		Final	
Athletes	Event	Time	Position	Time	Position	Time	Position
Ghulam Muhammad	Boys’ 100m Freestyle	1:02.68	51	Did not advance			

== Taekwondo ==
Athlete	Event	Preliminary	Quarterfinal	Semifinal	Final	Rank
Maham Aftab	Girls' -49kg	BYE	Dana Touran (JOR); L 0-21	did not advance		5

== Weightlifting ==
Athlete	Event	Snatch	Clean & Jerk	Total	Rank
Irfan Butt	Boys' 85kg	91	108	199	9
