= 2013 World Taekwondo Championships – Women's flyweight =

Taekwondo competition

Women's flyweight at the 2013 World Championships
- Venue: Exhibition Center of Puebla
- Dates: 16 July 2013
- Competitors: 48 from 48 nations

Medalists
gold medal	Chanatip Sonkham	Thailand
silver medal	Dana Haidar	Jordan
bronze medal	Lucija Zaninović	Croatia
bronze medal	Yania Aguirre	Cuba

The women's flyweight is a competition featured at the 2013 World Taekwondo Championships, and was held at the Exhibition Center of Puebla in Puebla, Mexico on July 16. Flyweights were limited to a maximum of 49 kilograms in body mass.

== Results ==
Legend

- DQ — Won by disqualification
- P — Won by punitive declaration

=== Finals ===
Semifinals		Final
Lucija Zaninović (CRO)	3
Dana Haidar (JOR)	6	Dana Haidar (JOR)	0
Yania Aguirre (CUB)	2	Chanatip Sonkham (THA)	13
Chanatip Sonkham (THA)	14

=== Top half ===
==== Section 1 ====
Round of 64
Ibeth Rodríguez (COL)	6
Cynthia Kragbe (CIV)	8
Akniyet Sadykova (KAZ)	1
Li Zhaoyi (CHN)	10
Leidiane Santos (BRA)	1
Miyu Yamada (JPN)	10
Melanie Phan (CAN)	5
Cyriesse Hall (JAM)	4

Round of 32
Lucija Zaninović (CRO)	9^{P}
Cynthia Kragbe (CIV)	1
Li Zhaoyi (CHN)	6
Kim Hye-jeong (KOR)	3
Đoàn Thị Hương Giang (VIE)	1
Miyu Yamada (JPN)	2
Melanie Phan (CAN)	7
Carolena Carstens (PAN)	0

Round of 16
Lucija Zaninović (CRO)	5
Li Zhaoyi (CHN)	2
Miyu Yamada (JPN)	5
Melanie Phan (CAN)	0

Quarterfinals
Lucija Zaninović (CRO)	3
Miyu Yamada (JPN)	2

==== Section 2 ====
Round of 64
Siv Anja Mienna (NOR)	1
Nancy Coto (CRC)	4
Natascha Mitrovits (AUT)	10
Yajaira Peguero (DOM)	14
Patimat Abakarova (AZE)	9
Rosa Keleku (COD)	0
Estefani Zambrano (BOL)	DQ
~~Fidelia Ibinga (GAB)~~

Round of 32
Julissa Diez Canseco (PER)	0
Nancy Coto (CRC)	1
Yajaira Peguero (DOM)	4
Dana Haidar (JOR)	10
Nicole Cham (PHI)	0
Patimat Abakarova (AZE)	7
Estefani Zambrano (BOL)	7
Nour Abdelsalam (EGY)	19

Round of 16
Nancy Coto (CRC)	0
Dana Haidar (JOR)	14
Patimat Abakarova (AZE)	2
Nour Abdelsalam (EGY)	3

Quarterfinals
Dana Haidar (JOR)	10
Nour Abdelsalam (EGY)	2

=== Bottom half ===
==== Section 3 ====
Round of 64
~~Rosalina Canduco (ANG)~~
Sabrina Nölp (GER)	DQ
Charlotte Craig (USA)	4
Despina Pilavaki (CYP)	1
Jasmine Branca (AUS)	5
Yania Aguirre (CUB)	9
Giulia Giordano (ITA)	10
Paula Benes (ESP)	8

Round of 32
Jannet Alegría (MEX)	2
Sabrina Nölp (GER)	5
Charlotte Craig (USA)	9
Jessica Rovira (AND)	1
Ganna Soroka (UKR)	6
Yania Aguirre (CUB)	8
Giulia Giordano (ITA)	3
Carola López (ARG)	8

Round of 16
Sabrina Nölp (GER)	2
Charlotte Craig (USA)	4
Yania Aguirre (CUB)	14
Carola López (ARG)	2

Quarterfinals
Charlotte Craig (USA)	5
Yania Aguirre (CUB)	8

==== Section 4 ====
Round of 64
Emiliana Machado (VEN)	9
Yuval Lustiger (ISR)	3
Siska Permatasari (INA)	3
Ivana Cujić (SRB)	4
Foteini Birmpa (GRE)	1
Sun Huei-ning (TPE)	4
~~Acacia Aggarwal (KEN)~~
Zura Mushambokazi (RWA)	DQ

Round of 32
Ekaterina Pulina (RUS)	3
Emiliana Machado (VEN)	3
Ivana Cujić (SRB)	1
Rukiye Yıldırım (TUR)	5
Kaltham Al-Mutawah (QAT)	3
Sun Huei-ning (TPE)	11
Zura Mushambokazi (RWA)	4
Chanatip Sonkham (THA)	16

Round of 16
Emiliana Machado (VEN)	2
Rukiye Yıldırım (TUR)	3
Sun Huei-ning (TPE)	9
Chanatip Sonkham (THA)	11

Quarterfinals
Rukiye Yıldırım (TUR)	4
Chanatip Sonkham (THA)	4
