= 2018 World Taekwondo Grand Slam - Open Qualification Tournament II =

Aekwondo competition

2018 World Taekwondo Grand Slam - Open Qualification Tournament II is an international G-2 taekwondo tournament which allows the winner to be seeded as 8th on the 2018 World Taekwondo Grand Slam bracket. It also allows the 2nd and 3rd placed athletes to qualify to the event.

The event was scheduled for October 26-28, 2018 in Wuxi, China.

This was the second Open Qualification Tournament of the year, the athletes who qualified in this event were ahead of the athletes who qualified on the first event, on the tournament brackets.

== Medal summary ==
=== Men ===
Event	Gold	Silver	Bronze
58 kg	Liang Yushuai; China	Youn Yeo-jun; South Korea	Hong Xinxin; China
68 kg	Huang Yu-jen; Chinese Taipei	Shin Dong-yun; South Korea	Konstantin Minin; Russia
80 kg	Namgoong Hwan; South Korea	Anton Kotkov; Russia	Icaro Soares; Brazil
+80 kg	Byeon Gil-young; South Korea	Yury Kirichenko; Russia	Xu Qiang; China

=== Women ===
Event	Gold	Silver	Bronze
49 kg	Kang Bo-ra; South Korea	Ha Min-ah; South Korea	Wenren Yuntao; China
57 kg	Luo Zongshi; China	Lee Ah-reum; South Korea	Marija Štetić; Croatia
67 kg	Zhang Mengyu; China	Dong Huimeng; South Korea	Doris Pole; Croatia
+67 kg	Gao Pan; China	Zheng Shuyin; China	Aleksandra Kowalczuk; Poland

== Medal table ==
Rank	Nation	Gold	Silver	Bronze	Total
1	China (CHN)	4	1	3	8
2	South Korea (KOR)	3	5	0	8
3	Chinese Taipei (TPE)	1	0	0	1
4	Russia (RUS)	0	2	1	3
5	Croatia (CRO)	0	0	2	2
6	Brazil (BRA)	0	0	1	1
6	Poland (POL)	0	0	1	1
Totals (7 entries)		8	8	8	24
