= Taekwondo at the 2014 Asian Games – Women's 49 kg =

Taekwondo competition

Women's 49 kg at the 2014 Asian Games
- Venue: Ganghwa Dolmens Gymnasium
- Date: 30 September 2014
- Competitors: 16 from 16 nations

Medalists
gold medal	Chanatip Sonkham	Thailand
silver medal	Li Zhaoyi	China
bronze medal	Sun Huei-ning	Chinese Taipei
bronze medal	Ronna Ilao	Philippines

The women's finweight (49 kilograms) event at the 2014 Asian Games took place on 30 September 2014 at Ganghwa Dolmens Gymnasium, Incheon, South Korea.

A total of sixteen competitors from sixteen countries competed in this event, limited to fighters whose body weight was less than 49 kilograms.

Chanatip Sonkham of Thailand won the gold medal after defeating Li Zhaoyi of China in the gold medal match 7–4.

== Schedule ==
All times are Korea Standard Time (UTC+09:00)

Date	Time	Event
Tuesday, 30 September 2014	09:30	Round of 16
Tuesday, 30 September 2014	15:30	Quarterfinals
Tuesday, 30 September 2014	15:30	Semifinals
Tuesday, 30 September 2014	18:00	Final

== Results ==
Legend

- P — Won by punitive declaration

Round of 16
Chanatip Sonkham (THA)	11
Zhazira Saparbek (KAZ)	2
Park Seon-ah (KOR)	10
Dana Haidar (JOR)	9
Sun Huei-ning (TPE)	14
Alisa Panyasyli (LAO)	1
Yan Kumari Chaulagain (NEP)	2
Nur Dhia Liyana (MAS)	7
Ronna Ilao (PHI)	3
Đoàn Thị Hương Giang (VIE)	1
Selbi Kiçigulowa (TKM)	2
Luisa Rosa (TLS)	16
Li Zhaoyi (CHN)	9
Samdansürengiin Yanjinlkham (MGL)	5
Kaltham Al-Mutawah (QAT)	0
Miyu Yamada (JPN)	12^{P}

Quarterfinals
Chanatip Sonkham (THA)	9
Park Seon-ah (KOR)	6
Sun Huei-ning (TPE)	16
Nur Dhia Liyana (MAS)	0
Ronna Ilao (PHI)	6
Luisa Rosa (TLS)	2
Li Zhaoyi (CHN)	8
Miyu Yamada (JPN)	2

Semifinals
Chanatip Sonkham (THA)	4
Sun Huei-ning (TPE)	3
Ronna Ilao (PHI)	1
Li Zhaoyi (CHN)	5

Final
Chanatip Sonkham (THA)	10
Li Zhaoyi (CHN)	3
