= Trinidad and Tobago at the 2026 Summer Youth Olympics =

- Flag of Trinidad and Tobago
- IOC code: TTO
- NOC: Trinidad and Tobago Olympic Committee

in Dakar, Senegal October 31, 2026 – November 13, 2026
- Competitors: 4 in 3 sports
- Flag bearers: Samiya Karim & Jaden Mills
- Medals: Gold 0 Silver 1 Bronze 0 Total 1

Summer Youth Olympics appearances
- 2010; 2014; 2018; 2026

Trinidad and Tobago is scheduled to compete at the 2026 Summer Youth Olympics in Dakar, Senegal from October 31 to November 13, 2026. This will mark Trinidad and Tobago's fourth appearance at the Youth Olympics, after making its debut in 2010.

The team of Trinidad and Tobago consisted of four athletes competing in three sports. Badminton player Samiya Karim and swimmer Jaden Mills served as the flag bearers for the opening ceremony.

== Competitors ==
The following is the list of number of competitors participating at the Games per sport/discipline.

Sport	Men	Women	Total
Badminton	0	1	1
Boxing	1	0	1
Swimming	1	1	2
Total	2	2	4

== Badminton ==
Trinidad and Tobago entered one female athlete.

Athlete	Event	Round of 16	Quarterfinals	Semifinals	Final / BM	
Athlete	Event	Opposition Result	Opposition Result	Opposition Result	Opposition Result	Rank
Samiya Karim	Women's individual					

== Boxing ==
Trinidad and Tobago entered one male athlete in the -65 kg category.

Men

Athlete	Weight	Round of 16	Quarterfinals	Semifinals	Final / BM	
Athlete	Weight	Opposition Result	Opposition Result	Opposition Result	Opposition Result	Rank
Makieve Bellille	-65 kg					

== Swimming ==
Trinidad and Tobago entered two swimmers, one male and one female.

Athlete	Event	Heat		Semifinal		Final	
Athlete	Event	Time	Rank	Time	Rank	Time	Rank
Jaden Mills	50 m freestyle						
Jaden Mills	50 m backstroke						
Jaden Mills	50 m butterfly						
Breanna Belmar	50 m freestyle						
Breanna Belmar	100 m freestyle						
Breanna Belmar	50 m breaststroke						
