= 2011 World Taekwondo Championships – Women's finweight =

Taekwondo competition

Women's finweight at the 2011 World Championships
- Venue: Gyeongju Indoor Stadium
- Dates: 4–5 May 2011
- Competitors: 46 from 46 nations

Medalists
gold medal	Kim So-hui	South Korea
silver medal	Li Zhaoyi	China
bronze medal	Rukiye Yıldırım	Turkey
bronze medal	Sümeyye Manz	Germany

The women's finweight is a competition featured at the 2011 World Taekwondo Championships, and was held at the Gyeongju Gymnasium in Gyeongju, South Korea on May 4 and May 5. Finweights were limited to a maximum of 46 kilograms in body mass.

== Results ==
Legend

- DQ — Won by disqualification
- R — Won by referee stop contest

=== Finals ===
Semifinals		Final
Rukiye Yıldırım (TUR)	1
Kim So-hui (KOR)	2	Kim So-hui (KOR)	13
Li Zhaoyi (CHN)	5	Li Zhaoyi (CHN)	6
Sümeyye Manz (GER)	2

=== Top half ===
==== Section 1 ====
Round of 64
~~Odete Soares Alves (TLS)~~
Yeung Wai Yee (HKG)	DQ
~~Eman Siddiq (SUD)~~
Khayala Guliyeva (AZE)	DQ
Shukrona Sharifova (TJK)	DQ
~~Jennifer Baez (AHO)~~

Round of 32
Rukiye Yıldırım (TUR)	13
Yeung Wai Yee (HKG)	0
Parker Bolili (COD)	1
Anastasia Valueva (RUS)	13
Carolena Carstens (PAN)	1
Khayala Guliyeva (AZE)	0
Shukrona Sharifova (TJK)	2
Yuliya Volkova (UKR)	5

Round of 16
Rukiye Yıldırım (TUR)	8
Anastasia Valueva (RUS)	6
Carolena Carstens (PAN)	9
Yuliya Volkova (UKR)	8

Quarterfinals
Rukiye Yıldırım (TUR)	4
Carolena Carstens (PAN)	0

==== Section 2 ====
Round of 64
Pauline Lopez (PHI)	1
Lee Wan-chen (TPE)	6
Nywe Nywe (MYA)	0
Mayelin Reyes (DOM)	8
Jasmine Branca (AUS)	7^{R}
Zebib Syum (ETH)	0
~~Virginia Dellán (VEN)~~	DQ
~~Omoowa Omoregie (NGR)~~	DQ

Round of 32
Katia Arakaki (BRA)	1
Lee Wan-chen (TPE)	2
Mayelin Reyes (DOM)	5
Kim So-hui (KOR)	15
~~Mary Muriu (KEN)~~
Jasmine Branca (AUS)	DQ
Bye
Elaia Torrontegui (ESP)

Round of 16
Lee Wan-chen (TPE)	4
Kim So-hui (KOR)	12
Jasmine Branca (AUS)	2
Elaia Torrontegui (ESP)	5

Quarterfinals
Kim So-hui (KOR)	8
Elaia Torrontegui (ESP)	1

=== Bottom half ===
==== Section 3 ====
Round of 64
Indah Marifah (INA)	0
Charlotte Craig (USA)	13
Andrea Franco (BOL)	2
Li Zhaoyi (CHN)	14
Vladana Stanišić (MNE)	4
Jessika Alair Soares (SWE)	6
Tio Jia Xin (SIN)	7
Shraddha Dixit (IND)	10

Round of 32
Yvette Yong (CAN)	6
Charlotte Craig (USA)	5
Li Zhaoyi (CHN)	13
Dilbar Hamdamova (UZB)	0
Victoria Álvarez (CHI)	4
Jessika Alair Soares (SWE)	5
Shraddha Dixit (IND)	0
Itzel Manjarrez (MEX)	7

Round of 16
Yvette Yong (CAN)	5
Li Zhaoyi (CHN)	7
Jessika Alair Soares (SWE)	1
Itzel Manjarrez (MEX)	2

Quarterfinals
Li Zhaoyi (CHN)	5
Itzel Manjarrez (MEX)	4

==== Section 4 ====
Round of 64
Zhansaya Abibulla (KAZ)	DQ
~~Nancy Orduz (COL)~~
Nermin El-Shimi (EGY)	7
Nefeli Pappa (GRE)	8
Giulia Giordano (ITA)	0
Anna Mirkin (ISR)	3

Round of 32
Alison Pinteno (FRA)	13
Zhansaya Abibulla (KAZ)	0
Nefeli Pappa (GRE)	1
Sümeyye Manz (GER)	8
Samdansürengiin Yanjinlkham (MGL)	6
Marina Usanović (CRO)	14
Anna Mirkin (ISR)	2
Buttree Puedpong (THA)	7

Round of 16
Alison Pinteno (FRA)	3
Sümeyye Manz (GER)	5
Marina Usanović (CRO)	0
Buttree Puedpong (THA)	13

Quarterfinals
Sümeyye Manz (GER)	8
Buttree Puedpong (THA)	4
