= Jordan at the 2010 Summer Youth Olympics =

- IOC code: JOR
- NOC: Jordan Olympic Committee

in Singapore
- Competitors: 6 in 4 sports
- Flag bearer: Yazan Alsadeq
- Medals Ranked 70th: Gold 0 Silver 1 Bronze 1 Total 2

Summer Youth Olympics appearances
- 2010; 2014; 2018

Jordan participated in the 2010 Summer Youth Olympics in Singapore.

== Medalists ==
Medal	Name	Sport	Event	Date
Silver	Dana Touran	Taekwondo	Women's 49kg	16 Aug
Bronze	Yazan Alsadeq	Taekwondo	Youth Men's +73kg	19 Aug

== Badminton ==
Boys

Athlete	Event	Group Stage				Knock-Out Stage			
Athlete	Event	Match 1	Match 2	Match 3	Rank	Quarterfinal	Semifinal	Final	Rank
Mohammad Qaddoum	Boys’ Singles	Poodchalat (THA) L 0-2 (3-21, 6-21)	Westerback (SWE) L 0-2 (4-21, 9-21)	Quach (DEN) L 0-2 (8-21, 13-21)	4	Did not advance			

== Gymnastics ==
=== Artistic Gymnastics ===
Boys

Athlete	Event	Floor		Pommel Horse		Rings		Vault		Parallel Bars		Horizontal Bar		Total	
Athlete	Event	Score	Rank	Score	Rank	Score	Rank	Score	Rank	Score	Rank	Score	Rank	Score	Rank
Adham Alsqour	Boys' Qualification	12.500	35	9.350	40	10.900	40	13.050	41	10.450	40	12.400	34	68.650	40

== Swimming ==
Athletes	Event	Heat		Semifinal		Final	
Athletes	Event	Time	Position	Time	Position	Time	Position
Omar Mithqal	Boys’ 50m Butterfly	27.04	15 Q	26.59	14	Did not advance	
Omar Mithqal	Boys’ 100m Butterfly	59.39	30	Did not advance			
Sara Hayajna	Girls’ 100m Freestyle	1:01.08	40	Did not advance			
Sara Hayajna	Girls’ 100m Backstroke	1:09.04	34	Did not advance			

== Taekwondo ==
Athlete	Event	Preliminary	Quarterfinal	Semifinal	Final	Rank
Yazan Alsadeq	Boys' +73kg		Jose Ramos (MEX); W 6-5	Liu Chang (CHN); L 1-2	did not advance	Bronze medal
Dana Touran	Girls' -49kg	Yasmin Terra (URU); W 14-1	Maham Aftab (PAK); W 21-0	Jessie Bates (USA); W 2-1	Worawong Pongpanit (THA); L 4-5	Silver medal
