= Tijana Bogdanović =

Serbian taekwondo practitioner

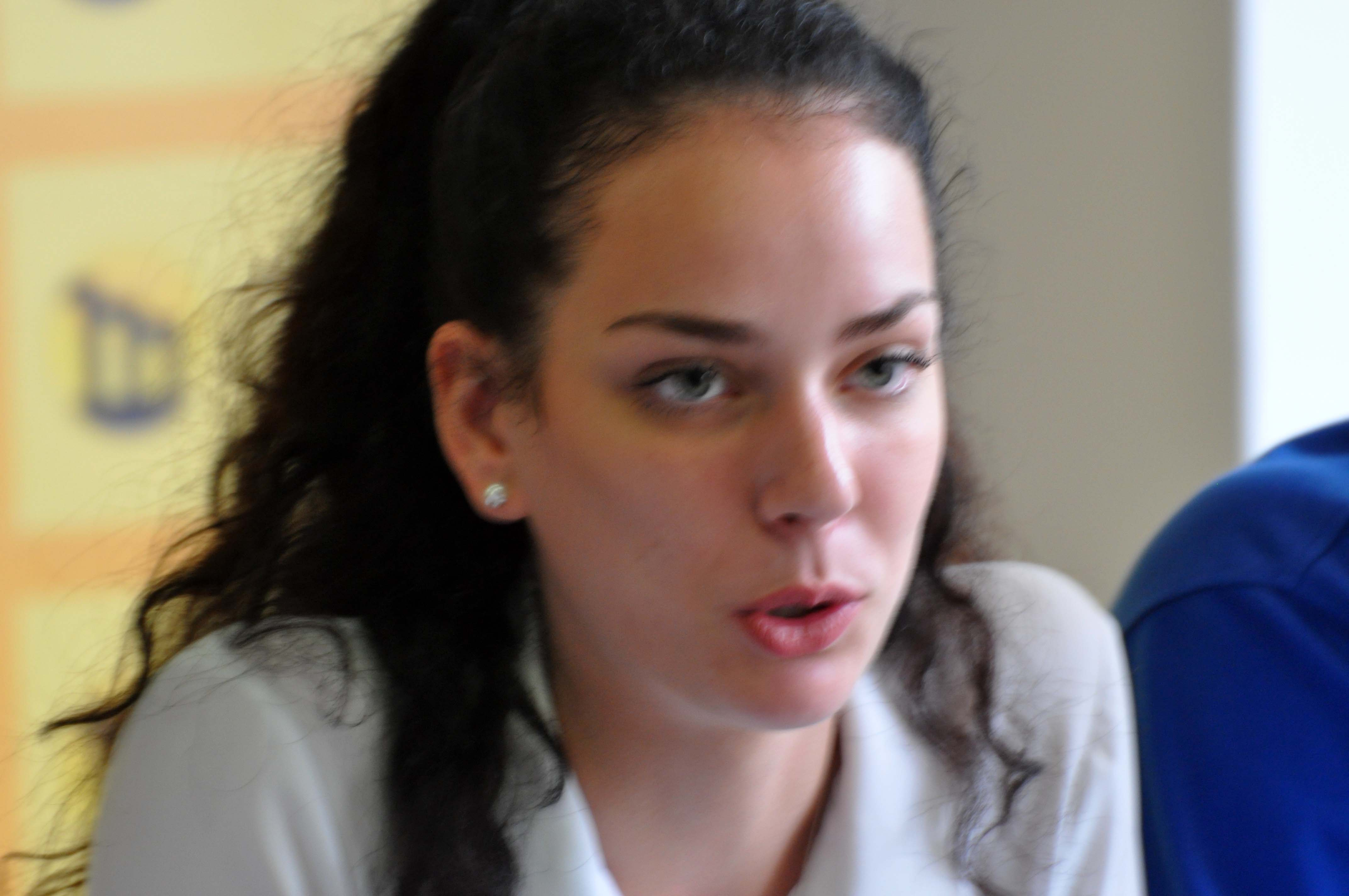
- Bogdanović in 2016

Personal information
- Born: 5 May 1998 (age 28) Kruševac, Serbia, FR Yugoslavia
- Height: 172 cm (5 ft 8 in)
- Weight: 49 kg (108 lb)

Sport
- Country: Serbia
- Sport: Taekwondo
- Event: Flyweight
Medal record
Olympic Games
| Silver medal – second place | 2016 Rio de Janeiro | 49 kg |
| Bronze medal – third place | 2020 Tokyo | 49 kg |
World Championships
| Bronze medal – third place | 2015 Chelyabinsk | 49 kg |
| Bronze medal – third place | 2022 Guadalajara | 53 kg |
Grand Prix
| Gold medal – first place | 2019 Moscow (F) | 49 kg |
| Silver medal – second place | 2017 London | 49 kg |
| Bronze medal – third place | 2015 Moscow | 49 kg |
| Bronze medal – third place | 2015 Manchester | 49 kg |
| Bronze medal – third place | 2017 Moscow | 49 kg |
| Bronze medal – third place | 2019 Chiba | 49 kg |
| Bronze medal – third place | 2019 Sofia | 49 kg |
European Championships
| Gold medal – first place | 2016 Montreux | 49 kg |
| Bronze medal – third place | 2018 Kazan | 53 kg |
European Games
| Silver medal – second place | 2015 Baku | 49 kg |
Universiade
| Gold medal – first place | 2017 Taipei | 53 kg |
| Gold medal – first place | 2017 Taipei | Team Kyorugi |
World Junior Championships
| Gold medal – first place | 2014 Taipei | 49 kg |
European Junior Championships
| Gold medal – first place | 2013 Porto | 46 kg |
| Gold medal – first place | 2015 Daugavspils | 49 kg |

Tijana Bogdanović (Serbian Cyrillic: Тијана Богдановић; born 5 May 1998) is a Serbian taekwondo athlete.

== Career ==
Bogdanović pursued her interest in taekwondo at the age of four, and started actively competing since 2004. She pursued her higher studies at the Singidunum University in the field of psychology.

She represented Serbia at the 2014 Summer Youth Olympics in the women's 49kg event. She clinched a bronze medal in the women's flyweight event during the 2015 World Taekwondo Championships. She claimed a silver after losing to England's Charlie Maddock in the women's 48kg event during the 2015 European Games. She was awarded the Best Young Athlete of Serbia in 2015.

She won a gold medal at the 2016 European Taekwondo Championships, but failed to defend the title two years later in Kazan, claiming the bronze there. She made her Olympic debut at the age of 18 as a schoolgirl during the 2016 Summer Olympics and she competed in the women's 49 kg category, where she clinched a silver medal. She was also the flagbearer for Serbia at the 2016 Summer Olympics during the closing ceremony. She was awarded the Sportswoman of the Year by the Olympic Committee of Serbia in 2016 following her success at the 2016 Rio Olympics.

She was knocked out of quarterfinal in the women's bantamweight event at the 2017 World Taekwondo Championships. She also reached round of 32 in the women's bantamweight event at the 2019 World Taekwondo Championships. She defeated China's Wu Jingyu to claim gold medal at the 2019 World Taekwondo Grand Prix.

She also represented Serbia at the 2020 Summer Olympics in the women's 49 kg category and won a bronze medal.

She won one of the bronze medals in the women's bantamweight event at the 2022 World Taekwondo Championships held in Guadalajara, Mexico.

== Personal life ==
Bogdanović lives in Belgrade, Serbia.

== See also ==
- List of Olympic medalists in taekwondo

Awards
| Preceded by Gavril Subotić | The Best Young Athlete of Serbia; 2015 | Succeeded by Incumbent |
