= 2013 World Taekwondo Championships – Women's finweight =

Taekwondo competition

Women's finweight at the 2013 World Championships
- Venue: Exhibition Center of Puebla
- Dates: 15 July 2013
- Competitors: 41 from 40 nations

Medalists
gold medal	Kim So-hui	South Korea
silver medal	Anastasia Valueva	Russia
bronze medal	Ren Dandan	China
bronze medal	Fadia Farhani	Tunisia

The women's finweight is a competition featured at the 2013 World Taekwondo Championships, and was held at the Exhibition Center of Puebla in Puebla, Mexico on July 15. Finweights were limited to a maximum of 46 kilograms in body mass.

== Results ==
Legend

- DQ — Won by disqualification
- P — Won by punitive declaration

=== Finals ===
Semifinals		Final
Ren Dandan (CHN)	1
Kim So-hui (KOR)	8	Kim So-hui (KOR)	8
Fadia Farhani (TUN)	4	Anastasia Valueva (RUS)	7
Anastasia Valueva (RUS)	8

=== Top half ===
==== Section 1 ====
Round of 64
~~Gloria Cañas (ESA)~~
Andrea Kilday (NZL)	DQ
Ren Dandan (CHN)	9
Cristina Torres (PUR)	2
Shraddha Dixit (WTF)	3
Turkana Tahirli (AZE)	5

Round of 32
Yvette Yong (CAN)	7
Andrea Kilday (NZL)	1
Katherine Calderón (PER)	0
Sinem Güldalı (GER)	5
~~Maria Prudence Mbia (GAB)~~
Ren Dandan (CHN)	DQ
Turkana Tahirli (AZE)	12
Parker Bolili (COD)	2

Round of 16
Yvette Yong (CAN)	7
Sinem Güldalı (GER)	6
Ren Dandan (CHN)	0
Turkana Tahirli (AZE)	0

Quarterfinals
Yvette Yong (CAN)	1
Ren Dandan (CHN)	2

==== Section 2 ====
Round of 64
Maryam Ismaili (BEL)	3
Merve Yazıcı (TUR)	16
Miryam Soler (COL)	6
Mayelin Reyes (DOM)	5

Round of 32
Elaia Torrontegui (ESP)	5
Merve Yazıcı (TUR)	2
Iryna Romoldanova (UKR)	2
Wong Shiao-pei (TPE)	0
Francine Lahely (MTN)	3
Samdansürengiin Yanjinlkham (MGL)	1
Miryam Soler (COL)	1
Kim So-hui (KOR)	11

Round of 16
Elaia Torrontegui (ESP)	5
Iryna Romoldanova (UKR)	3
Francine Lahely (MTN)	1
Kim So-hui (KOR)	12

Quarterfinals
Elaia Torrontegui (ESP)	6
Kim So-hui (KOR)	8

=== Bottom half ===
==== Section 3 ====
Round of 64
Virginia Dellán (VEN)	4
Gigi Gil (USA)	1
Farideh Rashidi (IRI)	11
Iliyana Eneva (BUL)	1

Round of 32
Nermin El-Shimi (EGY)	1
Virginia Dellán (VEN)	5
Iris Sing (BRA)	10
Hajer Mustapha (FRA)	8
Fadia Farhani (TUN)	DQ
~~Aigerim Yermekova (KAZ)~~
Farideh Rashidi (IRI)	4
Ioanna Koutsou (GRE)	3

Round of 16
Virginia Dellán (VEN)	2
Iris Sing (BRA)	1
Fadia Farhani (TUN)	9
Farideh Rashidi (IRI)	5

Quarterfinals
Virginia Dellán (VEN)	1
Fadia Farhani (TUN)	13^{P}

==== Section 4 ====
Round of 64
Andrea Cervantes (CRC)	3
Justina Lei (MAC)	2
Kyriaki Kouttouki (CYP)	12
Korina Paladin (PHI)	6

Round of 32
Anastasia Valueva (RUS)	7
Andrea Cervantes (CRC)	5
~~Farhiya Ali (KEN)~~
Victoria Álvarez (CHI)	DQ
Sidney Vicente (HON)	4
Mateja Kunović (CRO)	7
Kyriaki Kouttouki (CYP)	1
Itzel Manjarrez (MEX)	7

Round of 16
Anastasia Valueva (RUS)	13
Victoria Álvarez (CHI)	1
Mateja Kunović (CRO)	6
Itzel Manjarrez (MEX)	0

Quarterfinals
Anastasia Valueva (RUS)	8
Mateja Kunović (CRO)	7
