= Taekwondo at the 2015 European Games – Women's 49 kg =

Taekwondo competition

Women's 49 kg at the 2015 European Games
- Venue: Crystal Hall complex
- Date: 16 June
- Competitors: 16 from 16 nations

Medalists
gold medal	Charlie Maddock	Great Britain
silver medal	Tijana Bogdanović	Serbia
bronze medal	Patimat Abakarova	Azerbaijan
bronze medal	Lucija Zaninović	Croatia

Women's 49 kg competition at the Taekwondo at the 2015 European Games in Baku, Azerbaijan, took place on 15 June at Crystal Hall complex.

== Schedule ==
All times are Azerbaijan Summer Time (UTC+5).

Date	Time	Event
Tuesday, 16 June 2015	09:00	1/8 finals
Tuesday, 16 June 2015	15:00	Quarterfinals
Tuesday, 16 June 2015	17:00	Semifinals
Tuesday, 16 June 2015	21:15	Repechage
Tuesday, 16 June 2015	22:15	Finals

== Results ==
1/8 finals
Lucija Zaninović (CRO)	14
Terézia Pavková (SVK)	2
Indra Craen (BEL)	5
Tijana Bogdanović (SRB)	9
Kyriaki Kouttouki (CYP)	0
Ioanna Koutsou (GRE)	3
Alexandra Lychagina (RUS)	1
Patimat Abakarova (AZE)	7
Brigitte Yagüe (ESP)	2
Erica Nicoli (ITA)	3
Charlie Maddock (GBR)	8
Iryna Romoldanova (UKR)	7
Rukiye Yıldırım (TUR)	7
Ivett Gonda (HUN)	11
Sarah Malykke (DEN)	4
Yasmina Aziez (FRA)	5

Quarterfinals
Lucija Zaninović (CRO)	1
Tijana Bogdanović (SRB)	2
Ioanna Koutsou (GRE)	2
Patimat Abakarova (AZE)	4
Erica Nicoli (ITA)	3
Charlie Maddock (GBR)	17
Ivett Gonda (HUN)	1
Yasmina Aziez (FRA)	0

Semifinals
Tijana Bogdanović (SRB)	7
Patimat Abakarova (AZE)	6
Charlie Maddock (GBR)	4
Ivett Gonda (HUN)	1

Final
Tijana Bogdanović (SRB)	9
Charlie Maddock (GBR)	10

=== Repechage ===
Repechage round 1
Indra Craen (BEL)	3
Lucija Zaninović (CRO)	7
Iryna Romoldanova (UKR)	0
Erica Nicoli (ITA)	4

Bronze medal match
Lucija Zaninović (CRO)	9
Ivett Gonda (HUN)	1
Erica Nicoli (ITA)	0
Patimat Abakarova (AZE)	13
