= Taekwondo at the 2010 Summer Youth Olympics – Girls' 44 kg =

Taekwondo competition

The girls' 44 kg competition in taekwondo at the 2010 Summer Youth Olympics in Singapore took place on August 15. A total of 10 women competed in this event, limited to fighters whose body weight was less than 44 kilograms. Preliminaries started at 14:00, quarterfinals started at 15:38, semifinals at 18:30 and the final at 19:53. Two bronze medals were awarded at the Taekwondo competitions.

== Medalists ==
Gold	Anastasia Valueva; Russia
Silver	Iryna Romoldanova; Ukraine
Bronze	Shukrona Sharifova; Tajikistan
Bronze	Seyma Tuncer; Turkey

== Results ==
Legend

- PTG — Won by Points Gap
- SUP — Won by Superiority
- OT — Won on over time (Golden Point)

=== Main bracket ===
First round
Seyma Tuncer (TUR)	11
Maryam Shir Jahani (IRI)	0
Maria Silva (TLS)	0
Iryna Romoldanova (UKR)	18

Quarterfinals
Hajer Mustapha (FRA)	2
Seyma Tuncer (TUR)	4
Anastasia Valueva (RUS)
Lineo Machobane (LES)	DSQ
Li Zhaoyi (CHN)	1
Shukrona Sharifova (TJK)	3
Iryna Romoldanova (UKR)
Sara Sadeq (BRN)	RSC 1; 0:16

Semifinals
Seyma Tuncer (TUR)	4
Anastasia Valueva (RUS)	8
Shukrona Sharifova (TJK)	0
Iryna Romoldanova (UKR)	3

Final
Anastasia Valueva (RUS)	7
Iryna Romoldanova (UKR)	1
