= 2018 World Taekwondo Grand Slam =

Taekwondo international competition

- Venue: Wuxi Taihu International Expo Center
- Location: Wuxi, China
- Dates: 12–16 December
- Competitors: 128
- Total prize money: US$760,000

The 2018 World Taekwondo Grand Slam is the 2nd edition of the World Taekwondo Grand Slam series taking place from 12-16 December in Wuxi, China.

== Qualifications and seeding position ==
Seed	Result
No. 1 Seed	(China) 2017 Grand Slam champion
No. 2 Seed	(United Arab Emirates) 2018 Grand Prix Final champion
No. 3 Seed	(China) 2017 Grand Slam runner-up
No. 4 Seed	(United Kingdom) 2018 Grand Prix Series 4 champion
No. 5 Seed	(Chinese Taipei) 2018 Grand Prix Series 3 champion
No. 6 Seed	(Russia) 2018 Grand Prix Series 2 champion
No. 7 Seed	(Italy) 2018 Grand Prix Series 1 champion
No. 8 Seed	(China) 1st place athlete of Open Qualification Tournament II
No. 9 Seed	(China) 1st place athlete of Open Qualification Tournament I

- In case of one athlete occupying multiple seeding positions, the highest seeding position shall be assigned to the athlete, and vacant seeding positions shall be filled by other seeding athletes only
- The highest Olympic ranking athletes of November, 2018 shall fill up the unoccupied position, but not for seeding.

Non Seeded Athletes are as follows:

- 2nd place of 2018 Qualification Tournament II
- 2nd place of 2018 Qualification Tournament I
- 3rd place of 2018 Qualification Tournament II
- 3rd place of 2018 Qualification Tournament I
- Recommended athlete by WT Technical Committee
- Recommended athlete by WT Technical Committee
- Host Country Athlete

== Events schedule ==
The competition was held from 12 December to 16 December.

Event Date	Weight Division	
Event Date	Men	Women
12-16 December	-80 kg	-67kg
12-16 December	+80kg	+67kg
13-16 December	-58kg	-49kg
13-16 December	-68 kg	-57kg

== Medal summary ==
=== Men ===
Event	Gold	Silver	Bronze
58 kg	Jang Jun (KOR)	Liang Yushuai (CHN)	Armin Hadipour (IRI)
68 kg	Zhao Shuai (CHN)	Bradly Sinden (GBR)	Lee Dae-hoon (KOR)
80 kg	Maksim Khramtsov (RUS)	Namgoong Hwan (KOR)	Milad Beigi (AZE)
+80 kg	Sajjad Mardani (IRI)	In Kyo-don (KOR)	Song Zhaoxiang (CHN)

=== Women ===
Event	Gold	Silver	Bronze
49 kg	Panipak Wongpattanakit (THA)	Ha Min-ah (KOR)	Tan Xueqin (CHN)
57 kg	Zhou Lijun (CHN)	Jade Jones (GBR)	Lee Ah-reum (KOR)
67 kg	Lauren Williams (GBR)	Nur Tatar (TUR)	Ruth Gbagbi (CIV)
+67 kg	Bianca Walkden (GBR)	Madelynn Gorman-Shore (USA)	Aleksandra Kowalczuk (POL)

== Medal table ==
Rank	Nation	Gold	Silver	Bronze	Total
1	Great Britain (GBR)	2	2	0	4
2	China (CHN)	2	1	2	5
3	South Korea (KOR)	1	3	2	6
4	Iran (IRI)	1	0	1	2
5	Russia (RUS)	1	0	0	1
5	Thailand (THA)	1	0	0	1
7	Turkey (TUR)	0	1	0	1
7	United States (USA)	0	1	0	1
9	Azerbaijan (AZE)	0	0	1	1
9	Ivory Coast (CIV)	0	0	1	1
9	Poland (POL)	0	0	1	1
Totals (11 entries)		8	8	8	24
