= Taekwondo at the 2010 Summer Youth Olympics – Girls' 49 kg =

Taekwondo competition

The girls' 49 kg competition in taekwondo at the 2010 Summer Youth Olympics in Singapore took place on August 16. A total of 12 women competed in this event, limited to fighters whose body weight was less than 49 kilograms. Preliminaries started at 14:00, quarterfinals started at 15:54, semifinals at 18:30 and the final at 19:53. Two bronze medals were awarded at the Taekwondo competitions.

== Medalists ==
Gold	Worawong Pongpanit; Thailand
Silver	Dana Touran; Jordan
Bronze	Jessie Bates; United States
Bronze	Melanie Phan; Canada

== Results ==
Legend

- PTG — Won by Points Gap
- SUP — Won by Superiority
- OT — Won on over time (Golden Point)

=== Main bracket ===
First round
Dana Touran (JOR)	14
Yasmin Terra (URU)	1
So Hui Kim (KOR)	6
Jessie Bates (USA)	9
Jacira Mendes (CPV)	KO 1; 0:38
Worawong Pongpanit (THA)
Melanie Phan (CAN)	7
Nour Abdelsalam (EGY)	1

Quarterfinals
Maham Aftab (PAK)	RSC 3; 1:27
Dana Touran (JOR)
Jessie Bates (USA)
Chimi Wangmo (BHU)	RSC 2; 0:25
Haya Jumaa (UAE)	2
Worawong Pongpanit (THA)	12
Melanie Phan (CAN)	15
Nur Zakirah Zakaria (SIN)	6

Semifinals
Dana Touran (JOR)	2
Jessie Bates (USA)	1
Worawong Pongpanit (THA)	4 (SUP)
Melanie Phan (CAN)	4

Final
Dana Touran (JOR)	4
Worawong Pongpanit (THA)	5
