= Omoregie =

Omoregie is a surname. Notable people with the surname include:

- David Omoregie (born 1995), Welsh athlete
- Elizabeth Omoregie (born 1996), Slovenian handball player
- Justin Omoregie (born 2003), Austrian footballer
- Omoowa Omoregie, Nigerian taekwondo practitioner
- Sunny Omoregie (born 1989), Nigerian footballer
- David Orobosa Michael Omoregie (born 1998), British rapper and actor
