= 2014 Asian Taekwondo Championships =

Taekwondo competition

- Venue: Universal Palace Uzbekistan
- Location: Tashkent, Uzbekistan
- Dates: 26–28 May 2014

Champions
- Men: Iran
- Women: South Korea

The 2014 Asian Taekwondo Championships are the 21st edition of the Asian Taekwondo Championships, and were held at Universal Palace in Tashkent, Uzbekistan from May 26 to May 28, 2014.

== Medal summary ==
=== Men ===
| Event | Gold | Silver | Bronze |
|---|---|---|---|
| Finweight −54 kg | Kim Tae-hun; South Korea | Jerranat Nakaviroj; Thailand | Malik Abu Al-Rob; Palestine |
| Finweight −54 kg | Kim Tae-hun; South Korea | Jerranat Nakaviroj; Thailand | Reinaldy Atmanegara; Indonesia |
| Flyweight −58 kg | Farzan Ashourzadeh; Iran | Nguyễn Văn Duy; Vietnam | Cho Gang-min; South Korea |
| Flyweight −58 kg | Farzan Ashourzadeh; Iran | Nguyễn Văn Duy; Vietnam | Mahmood Haidari; Afghanistan |
| Bantamweight −63 kg | Lee Dae-hoon; South Korea | Akkarin Kitwijarn; Thailand | Raad Thabet; Jordan |
| Bantamweight −63 kg | Lee Dae-hoon; South Korea | Akkarin Kitwijarn; Thailand | Liao Zhijun; China |
| Featherweight −68 kg | Behnam Asbaghi; Iran | Ghazi Al-Asmari; Saudi Arabia | Song Guodong; China |
| Featherweight −68 kg | Behnam Asbaghi; Iran | Ghazi Al-Asmari; Saudi Arabia | Rohullah Nikpai; Afghanistan |
| Lightweight −74 kg | Won Jong-hun; South Korea | Alireza Nasr Azadani; Iran | Nikita Rafalovich; Uzbekistan |
| Lightweight −74 kg | Won Jong-hun; South Korea | Alireza Nasr Azadani; Iran | Peerathep Sila-on; Thailand |
| Welterweight −80 kg | Mehdi Khodabakhshi; Iran | Christian dela Cruz; Philippines | Maksim Rafalovich; Uzbekistan |
| Welterweight −80 kg | Mehdi Khodabakhshi; Iran | Christian dela Cruz; Philippines | Liu Wei-ting; Chinese Taipei |
| Middleweight −87 kg | Jasur Baykuziyev; Uzbekistan | Yousef Karami; Iran | Chang Kai; Chinese Taipei |
| Middleweight −87 kg | Jasur Baykuziyev; Uzbekistan | Yousef Karami; Iran | Wang Shijun; China |
| Heavyweight +87 kg | Dmitriy Shokin; Uzbekistan | Jo Chol-ho; South Korea | Morteza Shiri; Iran |
| Heavyweight +87 kg | Dmitriy Shokin; Uzbekistan | Jo Chol-ho; South Korea | Alisher Gulov; Tajikistan |

=== Women ===
| Event | Gold | Silver | Bronze |
|---|---|---|---|
| Finweight −46 kg | Panipak Wongpattanakit; Thailand | Aghniny Haque; Indonesia | Anjelay Pelaez; Philippines |
| Finweight −46 kg | Panipak Wongpattanakit; Thailand | Aghniny Haque; Indonesia | Lin Wan-ting; Chinese Taipei |
| Flyweight −49 kg | Kim Da-hwi; South Korea | Dana Haidar; Jordan | Chanatip Sonkham; Thailand |
| Flyweight −49 kg | Kim Da-hwi; South Korea | Dana Haidar; Jordan | Farideh Rashidi; Iran |
| Bantamweight −53 kg | Yoon Jeong-yeon; South Korea | Huang Yun-wen; Chinese Taipei | Latika Bhandari; India |
| Bantamweight −53 kg | Yoon Jeong-yeon; South Korea | Huang Yun-wen; Chinese Taipei | Sarita Phongsri; Thailand |
| Featherweight −57 kg | Lee Ah-reum; South Korea | Mayu Hamada; Japan | Sousan Hajipour; Iran |
| Featherweight −57 kg | Lee Ah-reum; South Korea | Mayu Hamada; Japan | Phạm Thị Hằng; Vietnam |
| Lightweight −62 kg | Chuang Chia-chia; Chinese Taipei | Xu Hong; China | Rungrawee Kurasa; Thailand |
| Lightweight −62 kg | Chuang Chia-chia; Chinese Taipei | Xu Hong; China | Feng Xiao; Macau |
| Welterweight −67 kg | Zhang Hua; China | Hà Thị Nguyên; Vietnam | Cassandra Haller; Thailand |
| Welterweight −67 kg | Zhang Hua; China | Hà Thị Nguyên; Vietnam | Shokraneh Izadi; Iran |
| Middleweight −73 kg | Umida Abdullaeva; Uzbekistan | Li Ran; China | Rima Ananbeh; Jordan |
| Middleweight −73 kg | Umida Abdullaeva; Uzbekistan | Li Ran; China | Chen Yann-yeu; Chinese Taipei |
| Heavyweight +73 kg | Li Donghua; China | Akram Khodabandeh; Iran | Natalya Mamatova; Uzbekistan |
| Heavyweight +73 kg | Li Donghua; China | Akram Khodabandeh; Iran | Sorn Davin; Cambodia |

== Medal table ==
| Rank | Nation | Gold | Silver | Bronze | Total |
|---|---|---|---|---|---|
| 1 | South Korea | 6 | 1 | 1 | 8 |
| 2 | Iran | 3 | 3 | 4 | 10 |
| 3 | Uzbekistan | 3 | 0 | 3 | 6 |
| 4 | China | 2 | 2 | 3 | 7 |
| 5 | Thailand | 1 | 2 | 5 | 8 |
| 6 | Chinese Taipei | 1 | 1 | 4 | 6 |
| 7 | Vietnam | 0 | 2 | 1 | 3 |
| 8 | Jordan | 0 | 1 | 2 | 3 |
| 9 | Indonesia | 0 | 1 | 1 | 2 |
| 9 | Philippines | 0 | 1 | 1 | 2 |
| 11 | Japan | 0 | 1 | 0 | 1 |
| 11 | Saudi Arabia | 0 | 1 | 0 | 1 |
| 13 | Afghanistan | 0 | 0 | 2 | 2 |
| 14 | Cambodia | 0 | 0 | 1 | 1 |
| 14 | India | 0 | 0 | 1 | 1 |
| 14 | Macau | 0 | 0 | 1 | 1 |
| 14 | Palestine | 0 | 0 | 1 | 1 |
| 14 | Tajikistan | 0 | 0 | 1 | 1 |
| Totals (18 entries) | | 16 | 16 | 32 | 64 |

== Team ranking ==
=== Men ===
| Rank | Team | Points |
|---|---|---|
| 1 | Iran | 56 |
| 2 | South Korea | 54 |
| 3 | Uzbekistan | 34 |

=== Women ===
| Rank | Team | Points |
|---|---|---|
| 1 | South Korea | 41 |
| 2 | China | 39 |
| 3 | Thailand | 30 |
