= Svetlana Igumenova =

Russian taekwondo practitioner

Personal information
- Nationality: Russian
- Born: 11 March 1988 (age 38)

Sport
- Sport: Taekwondo
Medal record
Representing Russia
Women's taekwondo
World Championships
Bronze medal – third place	2015 Chelyabinsk	Flyweight
European Championships
Bronze medal – third place	2014 Baku	-49 kg

Svetlana Igumenova (born 11 March 1988) is a Russian taekwondo practitioner.

She won a bronze medal in flyweight at the 2015 World Taekwondo Championships, after being defeated by Wu Jingyu in the semifinal. Her achievements at the European Taekwondo Championships include a bronze medal in 2014.
