= Lin Wan-ting =

Taiwanese taekwondo practitioner

Medal record

Women's taekwondo

Representing Chinese Taipei

World Championships
Bronze medal – third place	2015 Chelyabinsk	46 kg

Asian Games
Silver medal – second place	2014 Incheon	46 kg

Asian Championships
Bronze medal – third place	2014 Tashkent	46 kg

Summer Universiade
Gold medal – first place	2015 Gwangju	46 kg

Lin Wan-ting (Chinese: 林琬婷; pinyin: Lín Wǎntíng; born 24 February 1996) is a Taiwanese taekwondo practitioner. She made her first appearance in international competition at the 2013 East Asian Games. Lin placed third at the 2014 Asian Taekwondo Championships in May, and followed with a second-place finish at the 2014 Asian Games.
