= Swimming at the 2010 Summer Youth Olympics – Boys' 50 metre backstroke =

The boys' 50 metre backstroke event at the 2010 Youth Olympic Games took place on August 17–18, at the Singapore Sports School.

== Medalists ==
Gold	Christian Homer; Trinidad and Tobago	26.36
Silver	Rainer Kai Wee Ng; Singapore	26.45
Bronze	Abdullah Altuwaini; Kuwait	26.46
Bronze	Max Ackermann; Australia	26.46

== Semifinals ==
=== Semifinal 1 ===
Rank	Lane	Name	Nationality	Time	Notes
1	6	Christian Homer	Trinidad and Tobago	26.31	Q
2	4	Abdullah Altuwaini	Kuwait	26.62	Q
2	8	Alexis Manacas da Silva Santos	Portugal	26.62	Q
4	5	Max Ackermann	Australia	26.63	Q
5	3	Matuesz Wysoczynkski	Poland	26.80	Q
6	2	Abbas Raad	Lebanon	28.76	
7	7	Fouad Al Atrash	Palestine	30.80	
8	1	Ammar Ghanim	Yemen	37.56	

=== Semifinal 2 ===
Rank	Lane	Name	Nationality	Time	Notes
1	3	Rainer Kai Wee Ng	Singapore	26.37	Q
2	4	Andrii Kovbasa	Ukraine	26.48	Q
3	6	Pedro Antonio Costa	Brazil	27.04	Q
4	5	Måns Hjelm	Sweden	27.23	
5	2	Martin Fakla	Slovakia	27.54	
6	8	Heshan Unamboowe	Sri Lanka	27.70	
7	1	Ruslan Baimanov	Kazakhstan	27.94	
	7	Alan Wladimir Abarca Cortes	Chile		DSQ

== Final ==
Rank	Lane	Name	Nationality	Time	Notes
1st place, gold medalist(s)	4	Christian Homer	Trinidad and Tobago	26.36	
2nd place, silver medalist(s)	5	Rainer Kai Wee Ng	Singapore	26.45	
3rd place, bronze medalist(s)	6	Abdullah Altuwaini	Kuwait	26.46	
3rd place, bronze medalist(s)	7	Max Ackermann	Australia	26.46	
5	3	Andrii Kovbasa	Ukraine	26.58	
6	2	Alexis Manacas da Silva Santos	Portugal	26.86	
7	1	Matuesz Wysoczynski	Poland	26.96	
8	8	Pedro Antonio Costa	Brazil	27.16	
