= 2018 World Taekwondo Grand Slam - Open Qualification Tournament I =

Aekwondo competition

2018 World Taekwondo Grand Slam - Open Qualification Tournament I is an international G-2 taekwondo tournament which allows the winner to be seeded as 9th on the 2018 World Taekwondo Grand Slam bracket. It also allows the 2nd and 3rd placed athletes to qualify to the event. The event was scheduled for April 20-22, 2018 in Wuxi, China.

== Medal summary ==
=== Men ===
Event	Gold	Silver	Bronze
58 kg	Ramnarong Sawekwiharee; Thailand	Chen Xiaoyi; China	Kim Seong-Chin; South Korea
68 kg	Hakan Reçber; Turkey	Iker Casas; Mexico	Song Guodong; China
80 kg	Chen Linglong; China	Huang Jiannan; China	René Lizárraga; Mexico
+80 kg	Sun Hongyi; China	Carlos Sansores; Mexico	Stephen Lambdin; United States

=== Women ===
Event	Gold	Silver	Bronze
49 kg	Panipak Wongpattanakit; Thailand	Liu Kaiqi; China	Rukiye Yıldırım; Turkey
57 kg	Luo Zongshi; China	Hatice Kübra İlgün; Turkey	Phannapa Harnsujin; Thailand
67 kg	Zhang Mengyu; China	Nur Tatar; Turkey	Gao Pan; China
+67 kg	Zheng Shuyin; China	Nafia Kuş; Turkey	Li Chen; China

== Medal table ==
Rank	Nation	Gold	Silver	Bronze	Total
1	China (CHN)	5	3	3	11
2	Thailand (THA)	2	0	1	3
3	Turkey (TUR)	1	3	1	5
4	Mexico (MEX)	0	2	1	3
5	South Korea (KOR)	0	0	1	1
5	United States (USA)	0	0	1	1
Totals (6 entries)		8	8	8	24
