= Brunei at the 2010 Summer Youth Olympics =

- IOC code: BRU
- NOC: Brunei Darussalam National Olympic Council

in Singapore
- Competitors: 3 in 2 sports
- Flag bearer: Maziah Mahusin

Summer Youth Olympics appearances
- 2010; 2014; 2018

Brunei participated in the 2010 Summer Youth Olympics in Singapore.

The Brunei squad consisted of 3 athletes competing in 2 sports: aquatics (swimming) and athletics.

== Swimming ==
Athletes	Event	Heat		Semifinal		Final	
Athletes	Event	Time	Position	Time	Position	Time	Position
Jeremy Joint Riong	Boys' 50m Butterfly	30.68	19	Did not advance			
Jeremy Joint Riong	Boys' 100m Butterfly	1:11.27	33	Did not advance			
Amanda Jia Xin Liew	Girls' 50m Freestyle	28.25	33	Did not advance			
Amanda Jia Xin Liew	Girls' 50m Breaststroke	36.51	20	Did not advance			

== Athletics ==
Note: The athletes who do not have a "Q" next to their Qualification Rank advance to a non-medal ranking final.

=== Girls ===
Track and road events

Athletes	Event	Qualification		Final	
Athletes	Event	Result	Rank	Result	Rank
Maziah Mahusin	400m hurdles	DSQ qB		1:10.56	16
