= Fadia Farhani =

Tunisian taekwondo practitioner

Personal information
- Nationality: Tunisian
- Born: 5 February 1996 (age 30)

Sport
- Sport: Taekwondo
Medal record
Women's taekwondo
Representing Tunisia
World Championships
Bronze medal – third place	2013 Puebla	Finweight
African Championships
Gold medal – first place	2014 Tunis	-46 kg
Gold medal – first place	2016 Port Said	-46 kg
Bronze medal – third place	2018 Agadir	-46 kg

Fadia Farhani (born 5 February 1996) is a Tunisian taekwondo practitioner.

She won a bronze medal in finweight at the 2013 World Taekwondo Championships, after being defeated by Anastasia Valueva in the semifinal. Her achievements at the African Taekwondo Championships include gold medals in 2014 and 2016, and a bronze medal in 2018.

At the 2016 African Taekwondo Olympic Qualification Tournament she won one of the bronze medals in the women's −49 kg event.
