= Swimming at the 2010 Summer Youth Olympics – Boys' 50 metre butterfly =

The boys' 50 metre butterfly event at the 2010 Youth Olympic Games took place on August 18–19, at the Singapore Sports School.

== Medalists ==
Gold	Andrii Govorov; Ukraine	23.64
Silver	Gyucheol Chang; South Korea	24.05
Bronze	Tommaso Romani; Italy	24.80

== Heats ==
=== Heat 1 ===
Rank	Lane	Name	Nationality	Time	Notes
1	4	Pedro Antonio Costa	Brazil	24.98	Q
2	3	Sun Bowei	China	25.52	Q
3	5	Murray McDougall	South Africa	25.5	Q
4	6	Perry Lindo	Netherlands Antilles	26.50	Q
5	2	Juwel Ahmed	Bangladesh	28.66	Q
6	7	Jeremy Joint Riong	Brunei	30.68	
	1	Ralph Benjamin Teiko Quaye	Ghana		DNS

=== Heat 2 ===
Rank	Lane	Name	Nationality	Time	Notes
1	4	Tommaso Romani	Italy	25.15	Q
2	5	Kevin Leithold	Germany	25.24	Q
3	6	Jonathan Ponson	Aruba	25.59	Q
4	1	Armando Moss	Bahamas	26.46	Q
5	3	Juan Manuel Arbelaez	Colombia	26.64	Q
6	2	Omar Mithqal	Jordan	27.04	Q
7	7	Daniel Lee	Botswana	28.70	

=== Heat 3 ===
Rank	Lane	Name	Nationality	Time	Notes
1	4	Andrii Govorov	Ukraine	23.67	Q
2	5	Gyucheol Chang	South Korea	24.72	Q
3	3	Cadell Lyons	Trinidad and Tobago	25.02	Q
4	6	Sheng Jun Pang	Singapore	25.63	Q
5	2	Oriol Cunat Rodriguez	Andorra	26.55	Q
6	7	Adrian Todd	Botswana	28.69	
7	8	Ham Sserunjogi	Uganda	31.07	
8	1	Robel Habte	Ethiopia	32.20	

== Semifinals ==
=== Semifinal 1 ===
Rank	Lane	Name	Nationality	Time	Notes
1	4	Chang Gyu-Cheol	South Korea	24.63	Q
2	5	Cadell Lyons	Trinidad and Tobago	24.90	Q
3	3	Kevin Leithold	Germany	24.92	Q
4	6	Murray McDougall	South Africa	25.24	Q
5	7	Perry Lindo	Netherlands Antilles	26.17	
6	1	Juan Manuel Arbelaez	Colombia	26.31	
7	8	Juwel Ahmed	Bangladesh	28.19	
	2	Sheng Jun Pang	Singapore		DSQ

=== Semifinal 2 ===
Rank	Lane	Name	Nationality	Time	Notes
1	4	Andrii Govorov	Ukraine	23.46	Q
2	3	Tommaso Romani	Italy	24.93	Q
3	5	Pedro Antonio Costa	Brazil	25.02	Q
4	6	Sun Bowei	China	25.12	Q
5	2	Jonathan Ponson	Aruba	25.51	
6	7	Armando Ross	Bahamas	26.40	
7	1	Oriol Cunat Rodriguez	Andorra	26.42	
8	8	Omar Mithqal	Jordan	26.59	

== Final ==
Rank	Lane	Name	Nationality	Time	Notes
1st place, gold medalist(s)	4	Andrii Govorov	Ukraine	23.64	
2nd place, silver medalist(s)	5	Gyucheol Chang	South Korea	24.05	
3rd place, bronze medalist(s)	2	Tommaso Romani	Italy	24.80	
4	7	Pedro Antonio Costa	Brazil	24.81	
5	3	Cadell Lyons	Trinidad and Tobago	24.88	
6	1	Sun Bowei	China	25.20	
7	8	Murray McDougall	South Africa	25.22	
8	6	Kevin Leithold	Germany	26.37	
