= Sümeyye Manz =

German taekwondo practitioner

Personal information
- Nationality: German
- Born: Sümeyye Güleç; October 30, 1989 (age 36) Nürnberg, West Germany
- Height: 1.55 m (5 ft 1 in) (2012)
- Weight: 49 kg (108 lb) (2012)

Sport
- Country: Germany
- Sport: Taekwondo
- Event(s): Flyweight, Finweight
Medal record
Representing Germany
Women's taekwondo
World Championships
Bronze medal – third place	2005 Madrid	Finweight
Bronze medal – third place	2011 Gyeongju	Finweight
European Championships
Gold medal – first place	2008 Rome	Finweight

Sumeyye Manz (born Güleç on October 30, 1989, in Nürnberg) is a German taekwondo practitioner of Turkish descent.

She won the gold medal at the 2008 European Taekwondo Championships in Rome. She became bronze medalist at the 2005 World Taekwondo Championships in Madrid, Spain and 2011 World Taekwondo Championships in Gyeongju, South Korea.

She represented Germany at the 2008 Olympics and 2012 Olympics. At the 2008 Olympics she was defeated in the first round by Dalia Contreras. At the 2012 Summer Olympics, she competed in the Women's 49kg competition, but was defeated in the first round by Yang Shu-Chun.

== Personal life ==
Sümeyye Güleç is married to Daniel Manz, also a German national taekwondo practitioner.
