= Charlie Maddock =

English taekwondo practitioner

Personal information
- Nationality: English
- Born: 15 November 1995 (age 30) Stoke-on-Trent, England
- Height: 1.60 m (5 ft 3 in)
- Weight: 49 kg (108 lb)

Sport
- Country: United Kingdom
- Sport: Taekwondo
- Event: Flyweight (-49 kg)
- Club: GB Academy
- Coached by: Gareth Brown
Medal record
Women's taekwondo
Representing Great Britain
World Grand Prix
Gold medal – first place	2016 London	-49 kg
European Games
Gold medal – first place	2015 Baku	49 kg

Charlie Maddock (born 15 November 1995) is an English taekwondo athlete.

In May 2015, Maddock competed for Great Britain in the -49kg category at the 2015 World Taekwondo Championships. She reached the quarter-finals before being beaten 15-0 by Wu Jingyu.

In June 2015, Maddock took part in the inaugural European Games, winning Great Britain's first taekwondo medal at those games winning a gold medal.

In 2016, Maddock won her first global title, taking the World Grand Prix in London in the one-off final event.
