= Ghana at the 2010 Summer Youth Olympics =

- IOC code: GHA
- NOC: Ghana Olympic Committee

in Singapore
- Competitors: 20 in 3 sports
- Flag bearer: Alfred Ntiamoah

Summer Youth Olympics appearances
- 2010; 2014; 2018

Ghana participated in the 2010 Summer Youth Olympics in Singapore.

== Athletics ==
=== Boys ===
Field Events

Athletes	Event	Qualification		Final	
Athletes	Event	Result	Rank	Result	Rank
Atsu Nyamadi	Boys’ Triple Jump	14.93	8 Q	14.51	8

=== Girls ===
Track and Road Events

Athletes	Event	Qualification		Final	
Athletes	Event	Result	Rank	Result	Rank
Rita Luonab	Girls’ 1000m	3:03.06	16 Q	2:58.26	14

== Field hockey ==
Squad List	Event	Group Stage		Bronze Medal Match	
Squad List	Event	Opposition Score	Rank	Opposition Score	Rank
Eugene Acheampong; Luke Damalie; Alfred Ntiamoah (C); Emmauel Akaba; Ernest Opoku; Confidence Timpoh; Emmanuel Ankomah; Samuel Afari; Abdul Rahman Anum; Johnny Botsio; Matthew Damalie; Joseph Ashaley; Ebenezer Arthur; Selorm Kemevor; Fredrick Darko; Simon Dontoh	Boys' Hockey	Pakistan; L 3–6	4	Belgium; L 1–4	4
Eugene Acheampong; Luke Damalie; Alfred Ntiamoah (C); Emmauel Akaba; Ernest Opoku; Confidence Timpoh; Emmanuel Ankomah; Samuel Afari; Abdul Rahman Anum; Johnny Botsio; Matthew Damalie; Joseph Ashaley; Ebenezer Arthur; Selorm Kemevor; Fredrick Darko; Simon Dontoh	Boys' Hockey	Australia; L 0–8	4	Belgium; L 1–4	4
Eugene Acheampong; Luke Damalie; Alfred Ntiamoah (C); Emmauel Akaba; Ernest Opoku; Confidence Timpoh; Emmanuel Ankomah; Samuel Afari; Abdul Rahman Anum; Johnny Botsio; Matthew Damalie; Joseph Ashaley; Ebenezer Arthur; Selorm Kemevor; Fredrick Darko; Simon Dontoh	Boys' Hockey	Chile; W 4–3	4	Belgium; L 1–4	4
Eugene Acheampong; Luke Damalie; Alfred Ntiamoah (C); Emmauel Akaba; Ernest Opoku; Confidence Timpoh; Emmanuel Ankomah; Samuel Afari; Abdul Rahman Anum; Johnny Botsio; Matthew Damalie; Joseph Ashaley; Ebenezer Arthur; Selorm Kemevor; Fredrick Darko; Simon Dontoh	Boys' Hockey	Belgium; L 3–6	4	Belgium; L 1–4	4
Eugene Acheampong; Luke Damalie; Alfred Ntiamoah (C); Emmauel Akaba; Ernest Opoku; Confidence Timpoh; Emmanuel Ankomah; Samuel Afari; Abdul Rahman Anum; Johnny Botsio; Matthew Damalie; Joseph Ashaley; Ebenezer Arthur; Selorm Kemevor; Fredrick Darko; Simon Dontoh	Boys' Hockey	Singapore; W 2–1	4	Belgium; L 1–4	4

== Swimming ==
Athletes	Event	Heat		Semifinal		Final	
Athletes	Event	Time	Position	Time	Position	Time	Position
Joachim Ofosuhena-Wise	Boys’ 50m Breaststroke	36.80	17	Did not advance			
Joachim Ofosuhena-Wise	Boys’ 100m Breaststroke	1:29.93	30	Did not advance			
Ralph Benjamin Teiko Quaye	Boys’ 50m Butterfly	DNS		Did not advance			
Ralph Benjamin Teiko Quaye	Boys’ 100m Butterfly	1:17.03	36	Did not advance			
