= Taekwondo at the 2014 Asian Games – Women's 46 kg =

Taekwondo competition

Women's 46 kg at the 2014 Asian Games
- Venue: Ganghwa Dolmens Gymnasium
- Date: 1 October 2014
- Competitors: 12 from 12 nations

Medalists
gold medal	Kim So-hui	South Korea
silver medal	Lin Wan-ting	Chinese Taipei
bronze medal	Anjelay Pelaez	Philippines
bronze medal	Panipak Wongpattanakit	Thailand

The women's finweight (46 kilograms) event at the 2014 Asian Games took place on 1 October 2014 at Ganghwa Dolmens Gymnasium, Incheon, South Korea.

A total of twelve competitors from twelve countries competed in this event, limited to fighters whose body weight was less than 46 kilograms.

Kim So-hui of South Korea won the gold medal.

== Schedule ==
All times are Korea Standard Time (UTC+09:00)

Date	Time	Event
Wednesday, 1 October 2014	09:30	Round of 16
Wednesday, 1 October 2014	15:30	Quarterfinals
Wednesday, 1 October 2014	15:30	Semifinals
Wednesday, 1 October 2014	18:00	Final

== Results ==
Legend

- R — Won by referee stop contest
- W — Won by withdrawal

Round of 16
Laila Hussaini (AFG)	2
Nway Nway (MYA)	16
Eman Al-Adaileh (JOR)	4
Aghniny Haque (INA)	17
Panipak Wongpattanakit (THA)	9
Trương Thị Kim Tuyền (VIE)	3
Lin Wan-ting (TPE)	13^{R}
Aisha Al-Abdulla (QAT)	0

Quarterfinals
Anjelay Pelaez (PHI)	3
Nway Nway (MYA)	0
Aghniny Haque (INA)	1
Kim So-hui (KOR)	4
Anoulat Boudsingkhone (LAO)	0
Panipak Wongpattanakit (THA)	16
Lin Wan-ting (TPE)	19^{W}
Sondos Al-Zaid (KUW)	0

Semifinals
Anjelay Pelaez (PHI)	2
Kim So-hui (KOR)	14
Panipak Wongpattanakit (THA)	4
Lin Wan-ting (TPE)	5

Final
Kim So-hui (KOR)	10
Lin Wan-ting (TPE)	4
