= Swimming at the 2010 Summer Youth Olympics – Boys' 100 metre butterfly =

The men's 100 metre butterfly event at the 2010 Youth Olympic Games took place on August 16, at the Singapore Sports School.

== Medalists ==
Gold	Gyucheol Chang; South Korea	53.13
Silver	Chad le Clos; South Africa	53.31
Bronze	Velimir Stjepanović; Serbia	53.77

== Heats ==
=== Heat 1 ===
Rank	Lane	Name	Nationality	Time	Notes
1	3	Tsilavina Andritina Ramanantsoa	Madagascar	1:06.88	
2	4	Cristofer Jimenez	Nicaragua	1:07.64	
3	6	Ham Sserunjogi	Uganda	1:11.23	
4	5	Ralph Benjamin Teiko Quaye	Ghana	1:17.03	

=== Heat 2 ===
Rank	Lane	Name	Nationality	Time	Notes
1	3	Zlatko Alić	Bosnia and Herzegovina	57.46	
2	4	Serghei Golban	Moldova	57.81	
3	5	Ahmadreza Jalali	Iran	57.84	
4	6	Homayoun Haghighijadid	Iran	58.34	
5	8	Sofyan El Gadi	Libya	59.07	
6	2	Omar Mithqal	Jordan	59.39	
7	7	Juwel Ahmed	Bangladesh	1:02.97	
8	1	Jeremy Joint Riong	Brunei	1:11.27	

=== Heat 3 ===
Rank	Lane	Name	Nationality	Time	Notes
1	1	Kenneth To	Australia	54.16	Q
2	2	Jordan Coehlo	France	54.19	Q
3	4	Marcin Cieślak	Poland	54.64	Q
4	3	Roberto Sterlkov	Argentina	55.15	Q
5	5	Bowei Sun	China	55.30	Q
6	6	Melvin Herrmann	Germany	55.65	Q
7	7	Justin James	Australia	55.70	
8	8	Juan Manuel Arbelaez	Colombia	58.37	

=== Heat 4 ===
Rank	Lane	Name	Nationality	Time	Notes
1	3	Velimir Stjepanović	Serbia	54.71	Q
2	7	Hoang Quy Phuoc	Vietnam	54.74	Q
3	5	Bence Biczó	Hungary	54.76	Q
4	4	Mehdy Metella	France	54.81	Q
5	2	Kyusang Yoo	South Korea	55.58	Q
6	6	Ilya Lemaev	Russia	55.77	
7	1	Thomas Jobin	Canada	56.80	
8	8	Rainer Kai Wee Ng	Singapore	57.06	

=== Heat 5 ===
Rank	Lane	Name	Nationality	Time	Notes
1	3	Erich Peske	United States	54.50	Q
2	5	Gyucheol Chang	South Korea	54.66	Q
3	6	Chad le Clos	South Africa	54.93	Q
4	4	Tommaso Romani	Italy	55.10	Q
5	7	Cadell Lyons	Trinidad and Tobago	55.54	Q
6	2	Jun Isaji	Japan	55.88	
7	1	Sheng Jun Pang	Singapore	57.08	
8	8	Ondrej Palatka	Czech Republic	57.41	

== Semifinals ==
=== Semifinal 1 ===
Rank	Lane	Name	Nationality	Time	Notes
1	2	Chad le Clos	South Africa	53.67	Q
2	3	Velimir Stjepanović	Serbia	54.00	Q
3	6	Bence Biczó	Hungary	54.03	Q
4	4	Jordan Coehlo	France	54.11	Q
5	5	Marcin Cieślak	Poland	54.30	Q
6	1	Cadell Lyons	Trinidad and Tobago	54.88	
7	8	Melvin Herrmann	Germany	55.19	
8	7	Roberto Sterlkov	Argentina	55.20	

=== Semifinal 2 ===
Rank	Lane	Name	Nationality	Time	Notes
1	3	Gyucheol Chang	South Korea	53.41	Q
2	5	Erich Peske	United States	54.29	Q
3	2	Mehdy Metella	France	54.30	Q
4	7	Tommaso Romani	Italy	54.35	
5	4	Kenneth To	Australia	54.36	
6	6	Hoang Quy Phuoc	Vietnam	54.71	
7	1	Bowei Sun	China	54.73	
8	8	Kyusang Yoo	South Korea	55.16	

== Final ==
Rank	Lane	Name	Nationality	Time	Notes
1st place, gold medalist(s)	4	Gyucheol Chang	South Korea	53.13	
2nd place, silver medalist(s)	5	Chad le Clos	South Africa	53.31	
3rd place, bronze medalist(s)	3	Velimir Stjepanović	Serbia	53.77	
4	1	Marcin Cieślak	Poland	53.78	
5	2	Jordan Coehlo	France	53.96	
6	6	Bence Biczó	Hungary	53.99	
7	8	Mehdy Metella	France	54.35	
8	7	Erich Peske	United States	54.93	
