= Trinidad and Tobago at the 2018 Summer Youth Olympics =

- IOC code: TTO
- NOC: Trinidad and Tobago Olympic Committee

in Buenos Aires, Argentina 6 – 18 October 2018
- Competitors: 14 in 3 sports
- Medals: Gold 0 Silver 0 Bronze 0 Total 0

Summer Youth Olympics appearances
- 2010; 2014; 2018; 2026

Trinidad and Tobago participated at the 2018 Summer Youth Olympics in Buenos Aires, Argentina from 6 October to 18 October 2018.
