= Taekwondo at the 2010 Summer Youth Olympics – Boys' +73 kg =

Taekwondo competition

The boys' over 73 kg competition in taekwondo at the 2010 Summer Youth Olympics in Singapore took place on August 19. A total of 8 men competed in this event, limited to fighters whose body weight was greater than 73 kilograms. Quarterfinals started at 14:16, semifinals at 19:02 and the final at 20:09. Two bronze medals were awarded at the Taekwondo competitions.

== Medalists ==
Gold	Liu Chang; China
Silver	Ibrahim Ahmadsei; Germany
Bronze	Stefan Bozalo; Canada
Bronze	Yazan Alsadeq; Jordan

== Results ==
Legend

- PTG — Won by Points Gap
- SUP — Won by Superiority
- OT — Won on over time (Golden Point)

=== Main bracket ===
Quarterfinals
Jose Ramos (MEX)	5
Yazan Alsadeq (JOR)	6 PTF
Liu Chang (CHN)	7 PTF
Macho Hungan (INA)	2
Christian Ocampo (PER)	0
Stefan Bozalo (CAN)	8 PTF
Aliaksandr Shmakau (BLR)	5
Ibrahim Ahmadsei (GER)	6 PTF

Semifinals
Yazan Alsadeq (JOR)	1
Liu Chang (CHN)	2 PTF
Stefan Bozalo (CAN)	3
Ibrahim Ahmadsei (GER)	4 PTF

Final
Liu Chang (CHN)	5 PTF
Ibrahim Ahmadsei (GER)	4
