= Merve Yazıcı =

Turkish taekwondo practitioner (born 1**2)

Personal information
- Born: 21 August 1992 (age 33) Samsun, Turkey

Sport
- Country: Turkey
- Sport: Taekwondo
Medal record
Women's taekwondo
Representing Turkey
Deaflympics
| Gold medal – first place | 2021 Caxias do Sul | -49 kg |
| Gold medal – first place | 2017 Samsun | -49 kg |
| Gold medal – first place | 2013 Sofia | -49 kg |
World Championships
| Silver medal – second place | 2021 Tehran | -49 kg |
European Championships
| Gold medal – first place | 2019 Antalya | -57 kg |
| Silver medal – second place | 2015 Yerevan | -49 kg |

Merve Yazıcı (born 21 August 1992) is a Turkish female deaf taekwondo practitioner who competes in the −49 kg division. She is three-times Deaflympics champion.

== Sport career ==
Yazıcı started performing taekwonodo when she joined a summer sports course in 2004, opened by the district municipality of İlkadım in Samsun, where she lives. She continued with trainings and after one year she started to take part in tournaments for the deaf as well as for normal sportspeople. She was coached by Mustafa Gençtürk. During her high school years, she was a member of her school's sports club Feza Koleji.

She became champion in the -43 kg division at the 2009 European U21 Championships in Vigo, Spain, and 2009 Balkan Cadets & U21 Championships in Bursa, Turkey.

In 2012, she took the bronze medal in the -46 kg division at the Spanish Open in Alicante.

She won a bronze medal in the -46 kg division at the 2014 FISU World University Taekwondo Championships in Hohhot, China.

At the 2015 European Deaf Martial Arts Championships (Taekwondo) in Yerevan, Armenia, she lost the final match in the -49 kg and received the silver medal. She won the -49 kg dvision event at the 2015 Turkish Universities Championships in Manisa.

She competed in the -49 kg at the Deaflympics in 2013 Sofia, Bulgaria, 2017 Samsun, Turkey, and 2021 Caxias do Sul, Brazil, which was held in 2022. She captured the gold medal in all three Games.

At the 2019 European Deaf Taekwondo Championships in Antalya, Turkey, she captured the gold medal in the -57 kg division.

In November 2021, she won the silver medal in the -49 kg division at the World Deaf Taekwondo Championships in Tehran, Iran.

== Personal life ==
Merve Yazıcı was born in Samsun, northern Turkey, on 21 August 1992.

She is complete hearing impaired in her right ear and has hearing loss in her left ear due to the middle ear infection she had at the age of five.

She completed her secondary education at Feza Berk College in Samsun, and studied at Ondokuz Mayıs University again in her hometown.
