= Panipak Wongpattanakit =

Thai taekwondo practitioner (born 1997)

Flying Officer Panipak Wongpattanakit TBh
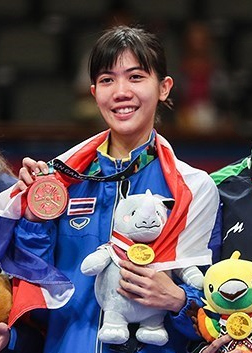
- Panipak at the 2018 Asian Games

Personal information
- Nickname: Tennis
- Nationality: Thai
- Born: 8 August 1997 (age 29) Mueang Surat Thani district, Surat Thani province, Thailand
- Education: Chulalongkorn University
- Height: 171.0 cm (5 ft 7 in)
- Website: Panipak Wongpattanakit on Facebook
- Military career
- Allegiance: Thailand
- Branch: Royal Thai Air Force
- Service years: 2021–present
- Rank: Flying Officer

Sport
- Sport: Taekwondo
- Coached by: Choi Young-Seok
Medal record
Women's taekwondo
Representing Thailand
| Event | 1st | 2nd | 3rd |
|---|---|---|---|
| Olympic Games | 2 | 0 | 1 |
| World Championships | 2 | 2 | 1 |
| Asian Games | 2 | 0 | 1 |
| Asian Championships | 2 | 1 | 0 |
| Grand Slam | 2 | 0 | 0 |
| Grand Prix | 12 | 2 | 1 |
| Total | 22 | 5 | 4 |
Olympic Games
| Gold medal – first place | 2020 Tokyo | 49 kg |
| Gold medal – first place | 2024 Paris | 49 kg |
| Bronze medal – third place | 2016 Rio de Janeiro | 49 kg |
World Championships
| Gold medal – first place | 2015 Chelyabinsk | 46 kg |
| Gold medal – first place | 2019 Manchester | 49 kg |
| Silver medal – second place | 2017 Muju | 49 kg |
| Silver medal – second place | 2023 Baku | 49 kg |
| Bronze medal – third place | 2022 Guadalajara | 49 kg |
Asian Games
| Gold medal – first place | 2018 Jakarta-Palembang | 49 kg |
| Gold medal – first place | 2022 Hangzhou | 49 kg |
| Bronze medal – third place | 2014 Incheon | 46 kg |
Asian Championships
| Gold medal – first place | 2014 Tashkent | 46 kg |
| Gold medal – first place | 2016 Pasay | 49 kg |
| Silver medal – second place | 2024 Da Nang | 49 kg |
Grand Slam
| Gold medal – first place | 2018 Wuxi | 49 kg |
| Gold medal – first place | 2019 Wuxi | 49 kg |
Grand Prix
| Gold medal – first place | 2017 Moscow | 49 kg |
| Gold medal – first place | 2017 London | 49 kg |
| Gold medal – first place | 2017 Abidjan (F) | 49 kg |
| Gold medal – first place | 2018 Taoyuan | 49 kg |
| Gold medal – first place | 2018 Manchester | 49 kg |
| Gold medal – first place | 2019 Chiba | 49 kg |
| Gold medal – first place | 2022 Paris | 49 kg |
| Gold medal – first place | 2022 Manchester | 49 kg |
| Gold medal – first place | 2022 Riyadh (F) | 49 kg |
| Gold medal – first place | 2023 Rome | 49 kg |
| Gold medal – first place | 2023 Taiyuan | 49 kg |
| Gold medal – first place | 2023 Manchester (F) | 49 kg |
| Silver medal – second place | 2015 Samsun | 49 kg |
| Silver medal – second place | 2018 Fujairah (F) | 49 kg |
| Bronze medal – third place | 2015 Mexico City (F) | 49 kg |
SEA Games
| Gold medal – first place | 2017 Kuala Lumpur | 49 kg |
| Gold medal – first place | 2019 Manila | 49 kg |
| Gold medal – first place | 2021 Hanoi | 49 kg |
| Gold medal – first place | 2023 Phnom Penh | 49 kg |
| Silver medal – second place | 2013 Naypiydaw | 49 kg |
FISU World University Games
| Gold medal – first place | 2017 Taipei | 49 kg |
| Gold medal – first place | 2019 Naples | 49 kg |
| Gold medal – first place | 2023 Chengdu | 49 kg |
Youth Olympics
| Gold medal – first place | 2014 Nanjing | 44 kg |
Asian Youth Games
| Silver medal – second place | 2013 Nanjing | 47 kg |
Asian Junior Championships
| Gold medal – first place | 2013 Jakarta | 44 kg |

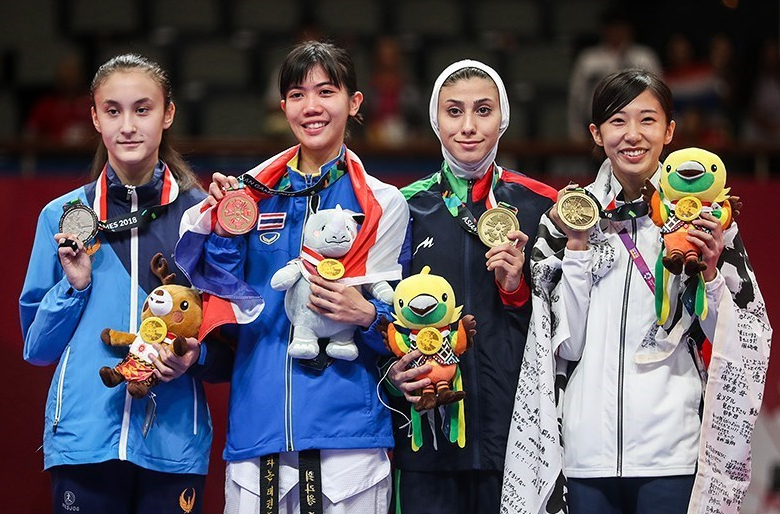
2018 Asian Games podium

Panipak Wongpattanakit (Thai: พาณิภัค วงศ์พัฒนกิจ; RTGS: Phaniphak Wongphatthanakit, nickname Tennis; born 8 August 1997) is a Thai retired taekwondo athlete. Twice Olympic, World Championships, and Asian Games champion, she was a leading athlete in the women's 49 kg throughout her international career, from 2013 to 2024. She is the only Thai athlete to have repeated as an Olympic champion.

== Early life ==
Born in Surat Thani, southern Thailand, Panipak is the youngest of three siblings. She lost her mother at a young age. Her father, a civil servant and teacher who loved sports, nicknamed his children after sports: Bowling, Baseball, and Tennis, respectively. Both her elder sister (Bowling) and brother (Baseball) were former swimmers.

Panipak started practicing taekwondo because she wanted to go to Phuket with a friend who was competing there. Her father agreed on the condition that she also compete. Although she was already practicing taekwondo at the time, she hadn't taken it seriously. After losing every match, she decided to focus seriously on the sport and eventually became a professional taekwondo athlete.

== Career ==
Panipak became a world champion at the 2015 World Taekwondo Championships, claiming a gold medal in the 46 kg event which was her first world title. She claimed a bronze medal at the 2016 Summer Olympics in the –49 kg class during her first Olympic appearance for Thailand. She nearly quit taekwondo out of frustration after the Olympics and took a brief break from the sport for about two months.

She claimed a bronze medal in the women's flyweight event at the 2017 World Taekwondo Championships. She claimed her first Asian Games gold medal during the 2018 Asian Games in women's 49kg event. She won the gold medal in the women's flyweight event during the 2019 World Taekwondo Championships. She was awarded the Female Athlete of the Year by the World Taekwondo during the 2019 World Taekwondo Gala Awards.

She also represented Thailand at the 2020 Summer Olympics and claimed a gold medal in the women's 49kg event. This win also became the first Olympic gold medal win for Thailand in taekwondo. Panipak was also awarded Thailand's first and only gold medal at the 2020 Summer Olympics.

She won the silver medal in the women's flyweight event at the 2023 World Taekwondo Championships held in Baku, Azerbaijan. At the Rome Grand Prix in June 2023, she won her tenth gold medal in the women's 49 kg event, making her the first athlete to do so.

In the 2024 Summer Olympics she won the gold medal again in the women's taekwondo 49kg category, becoming the first Thai athlete to win two consecutive Olympic gold medals and the first Thai three consecutive Olympic medalist. Before the tournament, she announced that this would be her last match, as the training was too intense for her body.

== Personal life ==
After the 2024 Summer Olympics, she revealed that she was dating fellow taekwondo practitioner Ramnarong "Junior" Sawekwiharee but had to keep it a secret for nine years because there was a rule that prohibited national athletes from being lovers.

== Career highlights ==
- Three-times Olympics Medalists (Gold: 2024, 2020 Bronze: 2016)
- Two-times World Champions (2019, 2015)
- Two-times Asian Games Gold Medals (2022, 2018)
- Youth Olympics Gold Medal (2014)

== Royal decorations ==
- 2020 – Companion (Third Class) of The Most Admirable Order of the Direkgunabhorn
- 2022 – Companion (Fourth Class) of The Most Noble Order of the Crown of Thailand

== See also ==
- List of Youth Olympic Games gold medalists who won Olympic gold medals
- List of Olympic medalists in taekwondo
