= Trinidad and Tobago at the 2014 Summer Youth Olympics =

- IOC code: TTO
- NOC: Trinidad and Tobago Olympic Committee

in Nanjing
- Competitors: 11 in 4 sports
- Medals Ranked 64th: Gold 0 Silver 1 Bronze 1 Total 2

Summer Youth Olympics appearances
- 2010; 2014; 2018

Trinidad and Tobago competed at the 2014 Summer Youth Olympics, in Nanjing, China from 16 August to 28 August 2014.

== Athletics ==
Trinidad and Tobago qualified five athletes.

Qualification Legend: Q=Final A (medal); qB=Final B (non-medal); qC=Final C (non-medal); qD=Final D (non-medal); qE=Final E (non-medal)

Boys
Track & road events

| Athlete | Event | Heats | | Final | |
| Athlete | Event | Result | Rank | Result | Rank |
|---|---|---|---|---|---|
| Akanni Hislop | 200 m | 21.42 | 8 Q | 21.57 | 4 |
| Kashief King | 400 m | 48.66 | 11 qB | 47.94 | 11 |

Field Events

| Athlete | Event | Qualification | | Final | |
| Athlete | Event | Distance | Rank | Distance | Rank |
|---|---|---|---|---|---|
| Andwuelle Wright | Long jump | 6.92 | 9 qB | 7.21 | 8 |

Girls
Track & road events

| Athlete | Event | Heats | | Final | |
| Athlete | Event | Result | Rank | Result | Rank |
|---|---|---|---|---|---|
| Jeminise Parris | 100 m hurdles | 13.62 PB | 4 Q | 13.76 | 5 |

Field events

| Athlete | Event | Qualification | | Final | |
| Athlete | Event | Distance | Rank | Distance | Rank |
|---|---|---|---|---|---|
| Chelsea James | Shot put | 15.15 | 9 qB | DNS | |

== Beach Volleyball ==
Trinidad and Tobago qualified a girls' team by winning the NORCECA CAZOVA Zone Qualifier.

| Athletes | Event | Preliminary round | Standing | Round of 24 | Round of 16 | Quarterfinals | Semifinals | Final / BM | Rank |
| Athletes | Event | Opposition Score | Standing | Opposition Score | Opposition Score | Opposition Score | Opposition Score | Opposition Score | Rank |
|---|---|---|---|---|---|---|---|---|---|
| Malika Davidson; Chelsi Ward | Girls' | Pool E (Germany) Arnholdt – Schneider; L 0 – 2 (5–21, (7–21) (Indonesia) Nanda – Dwi Andriani; L 0 – 2 (17–21, 12–21 (Republic of the Congo) Nkoka – Moyipele; W 2 – 0 (21–19, 21–9) (China) J. X. Wang – Yuan Lvwen; L 0 – 2 (21–4, 21–14) (Bolivia) Mela – Fer; L 2 – 0 21 –14, 21–12 | 4 Q | Hiruela / Verasio (ARG); L 0 - 2 (13-21, 13-21) | did not advance | | | | 25 |

== Sailing ==
Trinidad and Tobago qualified one boat based on its performance at the Byte CII North American & Caribbean Continental Qualifiers.

| Athlete | Event | Race | | | | | | | | | | | Net Points | Final Rank |
| Athlete | Event | 1 | 2 | 3 | 4 | 5 | 6 | 7 | 8 | 9 | 10 | M* | Net Points | Final Rank |
|---|---|---|---|---|---|---|---|---|---|---|---|---|---|---|
| Abigail Affoo | Girls' Byte CII | 28 | 23 | 26 | 29 | 29 | (30) | 15 | 17 | Cancelled | | 197.00 | 167.00 | 28 |

== Swimming ==
Trinidad and Tobago qualified three swimmers.

Boys

| Athlete | Event | Heat | | Semifinal | | Final | |
| Athlete | Event | Time | Rank | Time | Rank | Time | Rank |
|---|---|---|---|---|---|---|---|
| Dylan Carter | 50 m freestyle | 22.65 | 2 Q | 22.49 | 3 Q | 22.53 | 3rd place, bronze medalist(s) |
| Dylan Carter | 100 m freestyle | did not start | | | | | |
| Dylan Carter | 50 m backstroke | | | did not advance | | | |
| Dylan Carter | 50 m butterfly | 24.01 | 1 Q | 24.03 | 1 Q | 23.81 | 2nd place, silver medalist(s) |
| Dylan McLeod | 50 m backstroke | 26.78 | 17 | did not advance | | | |
| Dylan McLeod | 100 m backstroke | 58.18 | 27 | did not advance | | | |

Girls

| Athlete | Event | Heat | | Semifinal | | Final | |
| Athlete | Event | Time | Rank | Time | Rank | Time | Rank |
|---|---|---|---|---|---|---|---|
| Johnnya Ferdinand | 50 m freestyle | 27.31 | 30 | did not advance | | | |
