= Trinidad and Tobago at the 2010 Summer Youth Olympics =

- IOC code: TRI
- NOC: Trinidad and Tobago Olympic Committee

in Singapore
- Competitors: 26 in 3 sports
- Flag bearer: Kimberlee John-Williams
- Medals Ranked 50th: Gold 1 Silver 0 Bronze 0 Total 1

Summer Youth Olympics appearances
- 2010; 2014; 2018

Trinidad and Tobago participated in the 2010 Summer Youth Olympics in Singapore.

The Trinidad and Tobago team consisted of 26 athletes competing in 3 sports: athletics, football and swimming.

== Medalists ==
Medal	Name	Sport	Event	Date
Gold	Christian Homer	Swimming	Boys 50m Backstroke	16 Aug

== Athletics ==
=== Boys ===
Track and Road Events

Athletes	Event	Qualification		Final	
Athletes	Event	Result	Rank	Result	Rank
Ayodele Taffe	Boys’ 100m	11.05	11 qB	10.98	14
Darvin Sandy	Boys’ 200m	22.12	11 qB	22.15	10

=== Girls ===
Track and Road Events

Athletes	Event	Qualification		Final	
Athletes	Event	Result	Rank	Result	Rank
Kernesha Spann	Girls’ 400m	57.57	14 qB	57.05	14
Gabriela Cumberbatch	Girls’ 400m Hurdles	59.90	5 Q	1:01.93	7

== Football ==
=== Girls ===
Squad List	Event	Group Stage		5th Place Match	Rank
Squad List	Event	Group B	Rank	5th Place Match	Rank
Lebrisca Phillip; Tonietta Phillip; Abigail Jacob; Corinna Sequea (C); Adeka Spence; Shanyce Harding; Darian Diaz; Shari Thomas; Shanisa Camejo; Marlique Asson; Brittaney Prescott; Kerrecia Simon; Shanicar Diamond; Daydra James; Shenice Garcia; Jonelle Warrick; Anique Walker; Sheniec David	Girls' Football	Chile; L 0-1	3	Papua New Guinea; W 0-0; PSO 4-2	5
Lebrisca Phillip; Tonietta Phillip; Abigail Jacob; Corinna Sequea (C); Adeka Spence; Shanyce Harding; Darian Diaz; Shari Thomas; Shanisa Camejo; Marlique Asson; Brittaney Prescott; Kerrecia Simon; Shanicar Diamond; Daydra James; Shenice Garcia; Jonelle Warrick; Anique Walker; Sheniec David	Girls' Football	Equatorial Guinea; L 1-3	3	Papua New Guinea; W 0-0; PSO 4-2	5

=== Group B ===
Team	Pld	W	D	L	GF	GA	GD	Pts
Equatorial Guinea	2	2	0	0	7	2	+5	6
Chile	2	1	0	1	2	4	−2	3
Trinidad and Tobago	2	0	0	2	1	4	−3	0

12 August 2010
20:45

Chile	1 – 0	Trinidad and Tobago
Rodriguez 80'	Report

Jalan Besar Stadium, Singapore
Attendance: 2,493
Referee: Pannipar Kamnueng (Thailand)

15 August 2010
20:45

Trinidad and Tobago	1 – 3	Equatorial Guinea
Prescott 64'	Report	Avomo 7', 40+1'; V. Nchama 59'

Jalan Besar Stadium, Singapore
Attendance: 827
Referee: Gabriela Bandeira (Uruguay)

=== 5th Place Match ===
23 August 2010
18:00

Papua New Guinea	0 – 0	Trinidad and Tobago
	Report
Penalties
Steven (penalty missed); Morris (penalty scored); Obi (penalty missed); Kaikas (penalty scored)	2 – 4	Warrick (penalty scored); Asson (penalty scored); Jacob (penalty scored); Sequea (penalty scored)

Jalan Besar Stadium, Singapore
Attendance: 1,615
Referee: Gabriela Bandeira (Uruguay)

== Swimming ==
Athletes	Event	Heat		Semifinal		Final	
Athletes	Event	Time	Position	Time	Position	Time	Position
Cadell Lyons	Boys’ 50m Freestyle	23.78	13 Q	24.01	16	Did not advance	
Cadell Lyons	Boys’ 50m Butterfly	25.02	4 Q	24.90	3 Q	24.88	5
Cadell Lyons	Boys’ 100m Butterfly	55.54	14 Q	55.17	13	Did not advance	
Christian Homer	Boys’ 50m Backstroke			26.31	1 Q	26.36	Gold medal
Christian Homer	Boys’ 100m Backstroke	59.71	23	Did not advance			
Kimberlee John-Williams	Girls’ 100m Freestyle	1:00.15	36	Did not advance			
Kimberlee John-Williams	Girls’ 200m Freestyle	2:11.92	36			Did not advance	
Khadeja Phillip	Girls’ 50m Butterfly	30.04	17	Did not advance			
Khadeja Phillip	Girls’ 100m Butterfly	1:06.35	28	Did not advance			
Christian Homer; Kimberlee John-Williams; Cadell Lyons; Khadeja Phillip	Mixed 4 × 100 m Freestyle Relay	3:51.35	16			Did not advance	
Christian Homer; Kimberlee John-Williams; Cadell Lyons; Khadeja Phillip	Mixed 4 × 100 m Medley Relay	4:20.21	15			Did not advance	
