= Kim So-hui (taekwondo, born 1994) =

South Korean taekwondo practitioner

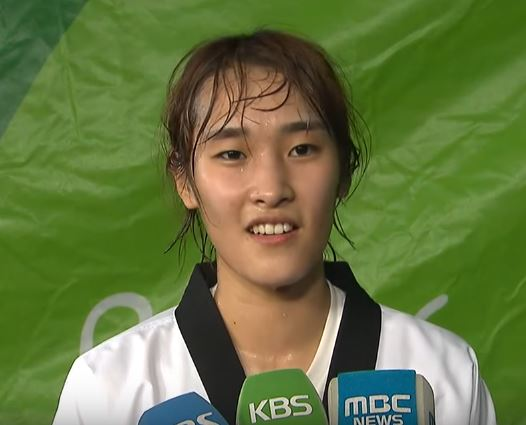

Personal information
- Born: January 29, 1994 (age 32) Jecheon, North Chungcheong Province
- Height: 164 cm (5 ft 5 in)
Medal record
Women's taekwondo
Representing South Korea
Olympic Games
Gold medal – first place	2016 Rio De Janeiro	49 kg
World Championships
Gold medal – first place	2011 Gyeongju	Finweight
Gold medal – first place	2013 Puebla	Finweight
Asian Games
Gold medal – first place	2014 Incheon	Finweight
Asian Championships
Bronze medal – third place	2012 Ho Chi Minh City	Finweight

Korean name
- Hangul: 김소희
- RR: Gim Sohui
- MR: Kim Sohŭi

Kim So-hui (Korean: 김소희; Korean pronunciation: [kim.so.ɦi]; born January 29, 1994) is a South Korean taekwondo practitioner. In 2016, she was ranked 10th by the World Taekwondo Federation.

== Career ==
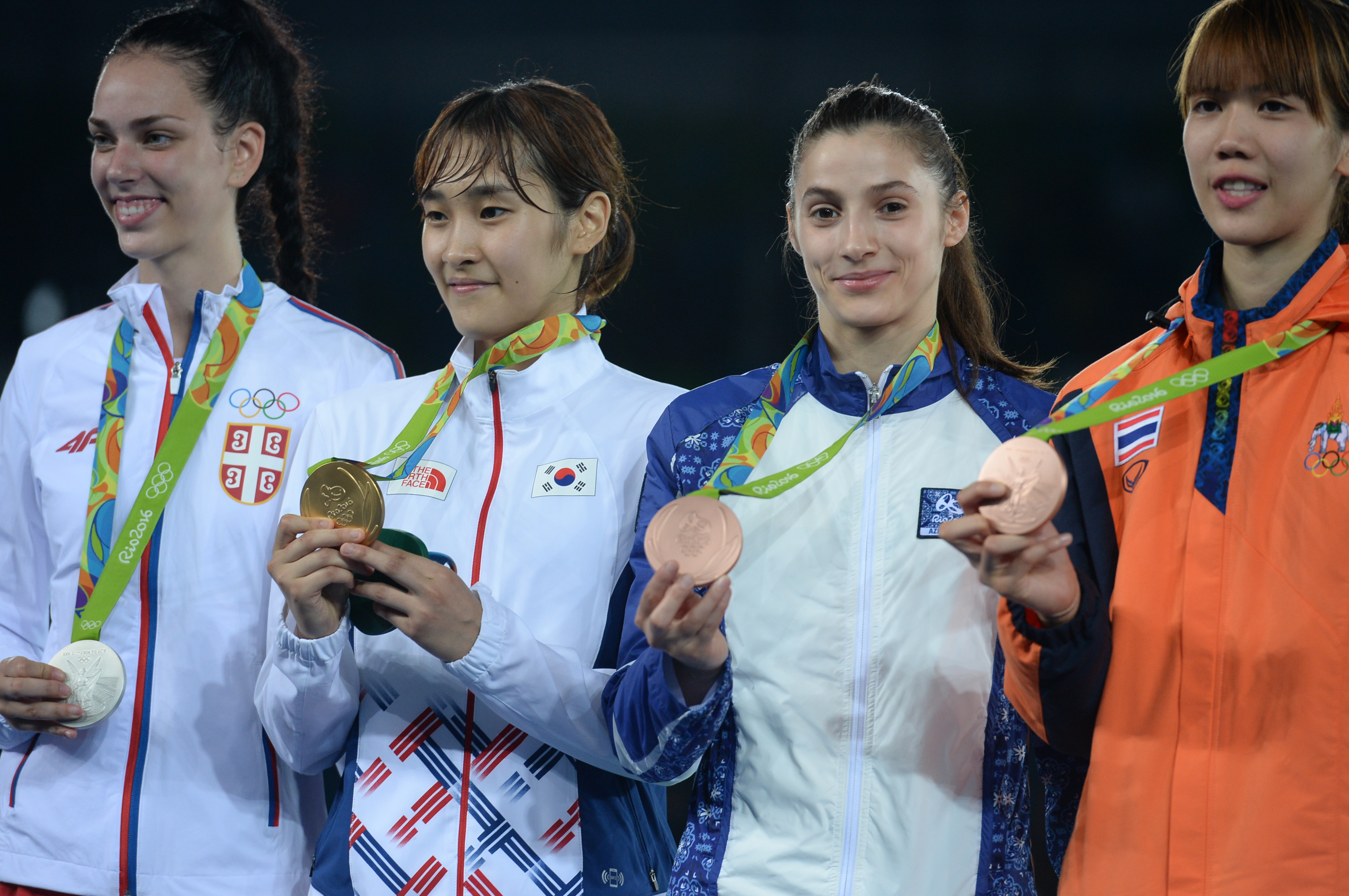
Kim at the 2016 Summer Olympics award ceremony

Kim won the gold medal in the women's finweight (under 46 kg) class at the 2011 World Taekwondo Championships in Gyeongju, South Korea, as a high schooler. Two years later she became the finweight world champion for the second time in a row at the 2013 World Taekwondo Championships in Puebla, Mexico, defeating Anastasia Valueva of Russia 8–7 in the final bout.

In the 2016 Rio Olympics Kim won her first Olympic Gold Medal in the 49 kg division. Three of her final matches were won convincingly through last second attacks and scoring.

== See also ==
- List of Olympic medalists in taekwondo
