= Anastasia Valueva =

Russian taekwondo practitioner

Medal record

Representing Russia

Women's taekwondo

World Championships
Silver medal – second place	2013 Puebla	Finweight

Universiade
Gold medal – first place	2011 Shenzhen	Finweight

Youth Olympic Games
Gold medal – first place	2010 Singapore	44 kg

Anastasia Valueva (Russian: Анастасия Валуева; born 29 November 1993) is a Russian taekwondo practitioner.

Valueva won the silver medal in the women's finweight (−46 kg) class at the 2013 World Taekwondo Championships, losing to Kim So-hui of South Korea 7–6 in the final match. She also won the gold medal in the girls' −44 kg division at the inaugural 2010 Youth Olympic Games in Singapore.
