= Omoowa Omoregie =

Nigerian taekwondo practitioner

Personal information
- Full name: Omoowa Omoregie
- Nationality: Nigeria
- Born: Nigeria

Sport
- Sport: Taekwondo
- Event: 53 kg
Medal record
Women's taekwondo
Representing Nigeria
African Taekwondo Championships
Bronze medal – third place	2009 African Taekwondo Championships	53 kg

Omoowa Omoregie is a Nigerian taekwondo practitioner who competes in the women's senior category. She won a bronze medal at the 2009 African Taekwondo Championships in the –53 kg category.

== Sports career ==
Omoregie participated in the 53 kg at the 2009 African Taekwondo Championship that held in Yaoundé, coming 3rd, she earned a bronze medal.
