= Chanatip Sonkham =

Thai taekwondo practitioner

Chanatip Sonkham TBh
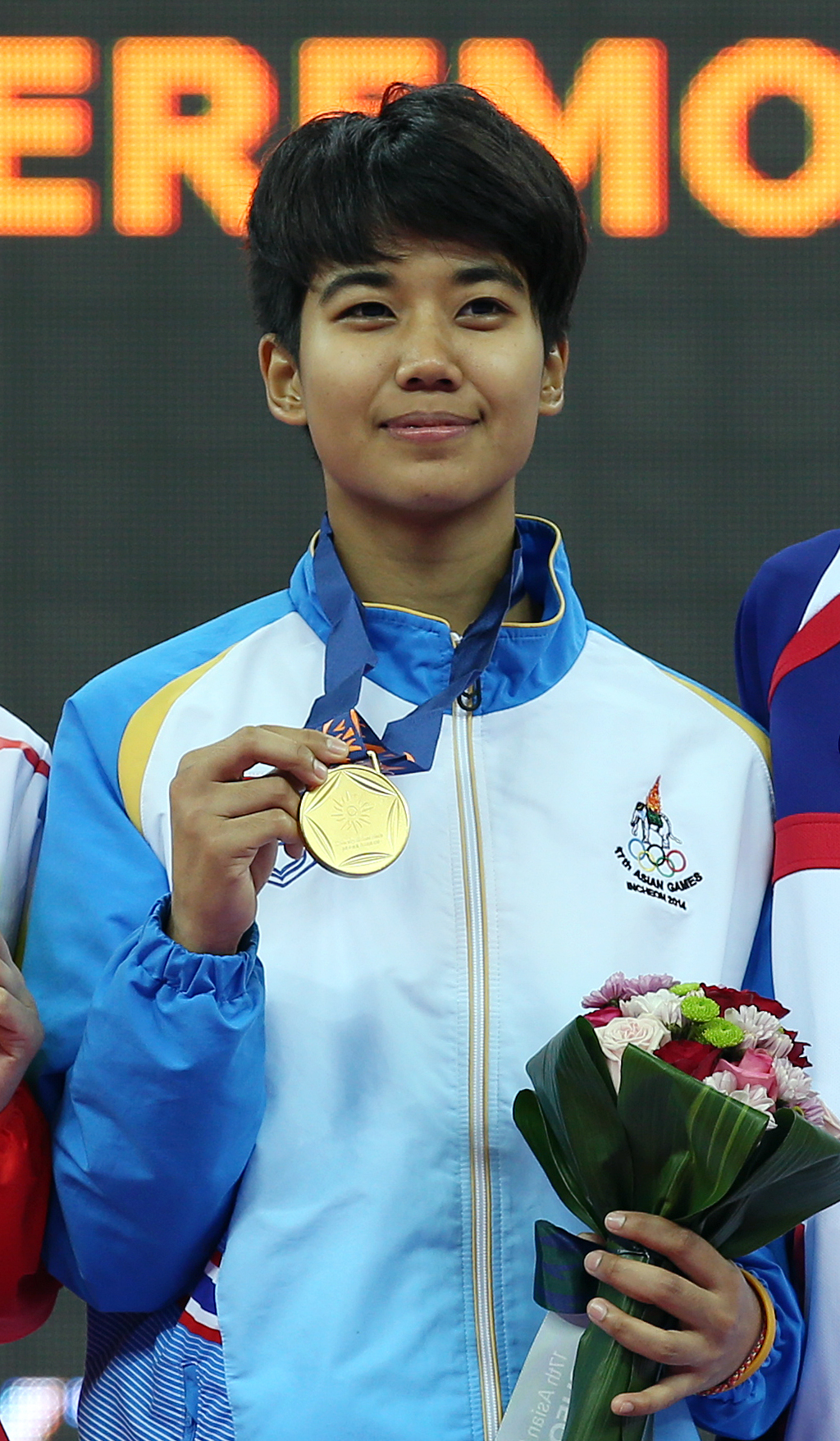
- Chanatip Sonkham

Personal information
- Nationality: Thailand
- Born: March 1, 1991 (age 35) Phatthalung, Thailand
- Height: 1.66 m (5 ft 5 1/2 in)

Sport
- Country: Thailand
- Sport: Taekwondo
- Event: Flyweight (-49 kg)
- Coached by: Choi Young-Seok
Medal record
Women's taekwondo
Representing Thailand
Event	1st	2nd	3rd
Olympic Games	0	0	1
World Taekwondo Championships	1	0	0
Asian Games	1	0	1
Asian Taekwondo Championships	0	1	3
Total	2	1	5
Olympic Games
Bronze medal – third place	2012 London	49 kg
World Championships
Gold medal – first place	2013 Puebla	49 kg
Grand Prix
Silver medal – second place	2015 Manchester	49 kg
Asian Games
Gold medal – first place	2014 Incheon	49 kg
Bronze medal – third place	2010 Guangzhou	49 kg
Asian Championships
Silver medal – second place	2016 Pasay	53 kg
Bronze medal – third place	2010 Astana	49 kg
Bronze medal – third place	2012 Ho Chi Minh City	49 kg
Bronze medal – third place	2014 Tashkent	49 kg
Southeast Asian Games
Gold medal – first place	2015 Singapore	49 kg
Universiade
Gold medal – first place	2015 Gwangju	49 kg
Bronze medal – third place	2009 Belgrade	49 kg
World Junior Championships
Silver medal – second place	2008 Izmir	46 kg
Asian Junior Championships
Gold medal – first place	2007 Amman	46 kg

Chanatip Sonkham or Chanapa Sonkham (Thai: ชนาธิป ซ้อนขำ; RTGS: Chanathip Sonkham; born 1 March 1991) is a Thai taekwondo practitioner who was the bronze medalist at the 2012 Summer Olympics in the under 49 kg weight class and curler. Sonkham also won bronze medals at the 2010 Asian Games and at the Asian Taekwondo Championships in 2010 and 2012. She won the gold medal at the 2013 World Championship.

== Curling ==
Sonkham also represented Thailand in mixed doubles curling, representing the country at the 2025 Asian Winter Games, where she finished in 8th place with partner Teekawin Jearateerawit.

== See also ==
- List of Olympic medalists in taekwondo
