= Li Zhaoyi (taekwondo) =

Chinese taekwondo practitioner

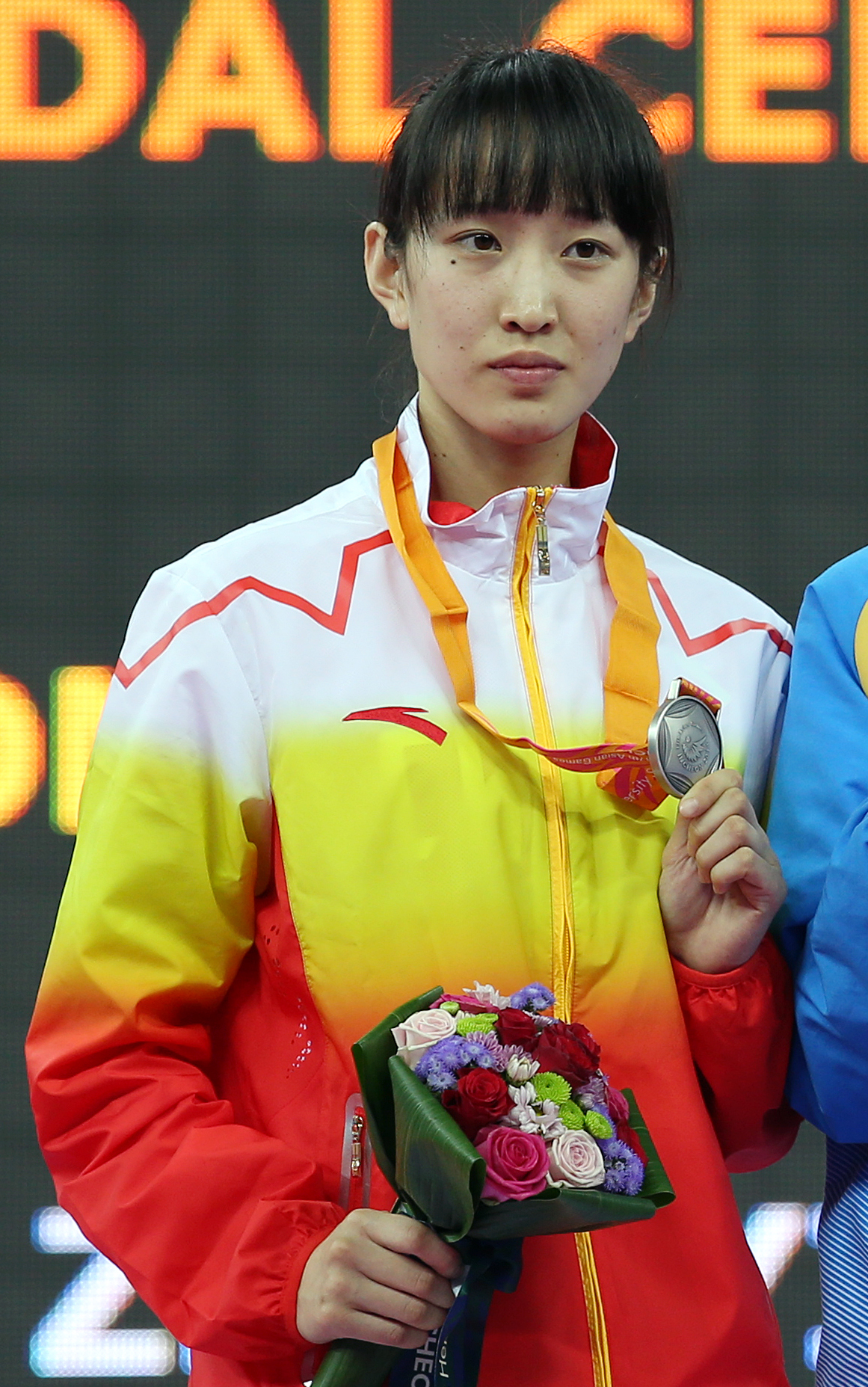
- Zhaoyi at Incheon Asian Games 2014

Personal information
- Nationality: Chinese
- Born: 25 August 1994 (age 32) Xinjiang, China

Sport
- Sport: Taekwondo
Medal record
Representing China
Women's taekwondo
World Championships
Silver medal – second place	2011 Gyeongju	Finweight
Asian Championships
Silver medal – second place	2012 Ho Chi Minh City	-46 kg
Asian Games
Silver medal – second place	2014 Incheon	-49 kg

Li Zhaoyi (born 25 August 1994) is a Chinese taekwondo practitioner.

She won a silver medal in finweight at the 2011 World Taekwondo Championships, after being defeated by Kim So-hui in the final. She won a silver medal at the 2012 Asian Taekwondo Championships, and a silver medal at the 2014 Asian Games.
