= Patimat Abakarova =

Azerbaijani taekwondo practitioner

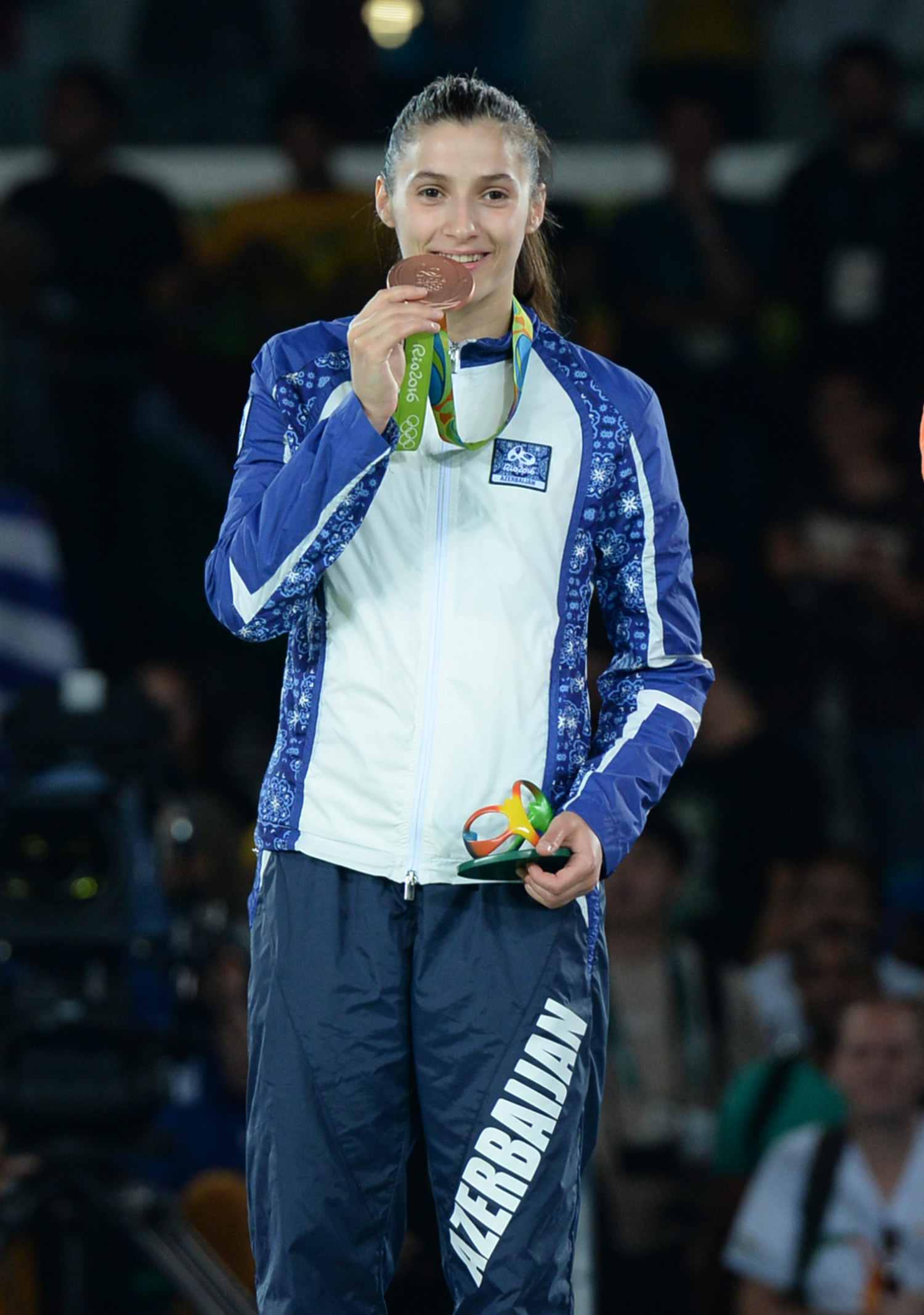
- Patimat Abakarova at the 2016 Summer Olympics awarding ceremony

Personal information
- Nationality: Azerbaijani, Russian
- Born: 23 October 1994 (age 31) Makhachkala, Dagestan, Russia
- Height: 1.65 m (5 ft 5 in)
- Weight: 49 kg (108 lb)

Sport
- Country: Russia (2010-2013); Azerbaijan (2013-present)
- Sport: Taekwondo
- Event: Bantamweight (53 kg)
- Coached by: Park Sun-mi
Medal record
Women's taekwondo
Representing Azerbaijan
Olympic Games
Bronze medal – third place	2016 Rio de Janeiro	49 kg
European Games
Bronze medal – third place	2015 Baku	49 kg
European Championships
Silver medal – second place	2016 Montreux	Bantamweight
Bronze medal – third place	2018 Kazan	Bantamweight
Universiade
Bronze medal – third place	2019 Napoli	53 kg
Islamic Solidarity Games
Gold medal – first place	2017 Baku	49 kg
Bronze medal – third place	2021 Konya	49 kg

Patimat Serajutdin Abakarova (born 23 October 1994) is a Dagestani-born Azerbaijani taekwondo athlete. She has been playing for the Azerbaijan national team since 2013. Patimat Abakarova won a bronze medal at the 2016 Rio Olympics. At the European Championships, she won a silver medal in 2016 and a bronze in 2018. Abakarova also won bronze medals at the 3rd Islamic Solidarity Games in 2013 and the 1st European Games in 2015.

She competed at the 2016 Summer Olympics in Rio de Janeiro, in the women's 49 kg and won bronze medal.

== Biography ==
Patimat Abakarova, an ethnic Dargin, was born on October 23, 1994, in Makhachkala. At the age of 9, she went to the karate section, and three months later she moved with her family and could not attend training. Nevertheless, near the new place of residence - in the 38th school of Makhachkala - taekwondo classes were held by coach Ismail Ismailov, under whose supervision Abakarova began to practice taekwondo. Soon the team moved to the new Martial Arts Center, which Abakarova still attends. In 2013, the Azerbaijan Taekwondo Federation offered Abakarova to perform at the domestic championship of Azerbaijan, in which Abakarova took first place. Soon Patimat was invited to the training camp. She was looked at by the coaching staff of the national team, by the decision of which Abakarova was offered to compete for Azerbaijan. In June 2015, she took part in the first European Games in Baku, where she took third place. On June 29, President of Azerbaijan Ilham Aliyev signed orders to award the winners of the first European Games and persons who made a great contribution to the development of sports in Azerbaijan. Patimat Abakarova was awarded the Progress medal for her great achievements at the first European Games and her contribution to the development of sports in Azerbaijan. In 2016, at the European Olympic Qualification Tournament, held in Istanbul, she took first place, having received a ticket to the Olympic Games in Rio de Janeiro. In the same year, she became the silver medalist of the European Championship, held in Montreux, Switzerland, losing in the final to Tatyana Kudashova from Russia. She won a bronze medal at the 2016 Summer Olympics.

== See also ==
- Muslim women in sport
- List of Olympic medalists in taekwondo
