= Maham Aftab =

Pakistani taekwondo player (1994–2020)

Maham Aftab (5 November 1994 – 23 October 2020) was an international taekwondo practitioner and a member of the Pakistan national taekwondo team. She won several medals for Pakistan at national and international level. She died of brain tumor.

== Background ==
She belonged to Vehari, a city in Punjab, Pakistan.

== Career ==
Aftab represented Pakistan in the Youth Olympics held in Indonesia. Aftab won a gold medal in a taekwondo championship at the King Al-Hasan Cup in Jordan. In 2008, Aftab participated in World Championship in Izmir where she reached the final. She was defeated in the final by Stele Simunic of Croatia. In 2009, she took part in Asian Championships in Kish Island, Iran. In 2010, Aftab participated in the Youth Olympics in Singapore in 2010 and also in the Youth Olympics in 2014. Aftab quit taekwondo in 2015. She became the first female athlete to win a medal for Pakistan in an international competition. Aftab also represented Pakistan Army and was the national champion for seven consecutive years.

== Death ==
She was diagnosed with brain tumor two months before her death. She died on 23 October 2020 at the age of 25 in Islamabad. She was under treatment at the Shaukat Khanum Hospital, Lahore before her death and was discharged a few days before. Her death was condoled by various members of the sports fraternity. She was laid to rest in her hometown Vehari. She left behind a two-year-old son.
