= Wu Jingyu =

Chinese taekwondo practitioner

Wu Jingyu OLY
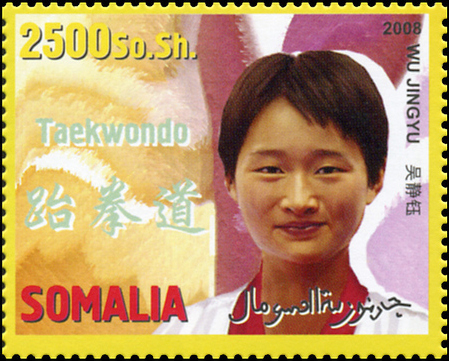
- Wu Jingyu on a 2008 Somalia stamp

Personal information
- Nationality: Chinese
- Born: February 1, 1987 (age 39) Jingdezhen, Jiangxi, China
- Height: 168 cm (5 ft 6 in)
- Weight: 49 kg (108 lb)

Sport
- Country: China
- Sport: Taekwondo
- Event: -49 kg
- Club: Jiangxi Provincial Weightlifting and Combat Sports Administrative Centre
- Coached by: Chen Liren
Medal record
Women's taekwondo
Representing China
Event	1st	2nd	3rd
Olympic Games	2	0	0
World Championships	2	1	1
Asian Games	2	0	0
Asian Championships	1	2	0
Total	7	3	1
Olympic Games
Gold medal – first place	2008 Beijing	–49kg
Gold medal – first place	2012 London	–49kg
World Championships
Gold medal – first place	2007 Beijing	–47kg
Gold medal – first place	2011 Gyeongju	–49kg
Silver medal – second place	2015 Chelyabinsk	–49kg
Silver medal – second place	2019 Manchester	–49kg
Bronze medal – third place	2009 Copenhagen	–49kg
Asian Games
Gold medal – first place	2006 Doha	–47kg
Gold medal – first place	2010 Guangzhou	–49kg
Bronze medal – third place	2014 Incheon	–49kg
Asian Championships
Gold medal – first place	2010 Astana	–49kg
Silver medal – second place	2006 Bangkok	–47kg
Silver medal – second place	2008 Luoyang	–51kg
Olympic Esports Series
Bronze medal – third place	2023 Singapore	Virtual Taekwondo
- Updated on 20 May 2019

Wu Jingyu (simplified Chinese: 吴静钰; traditional Chinese: 吳靜鈺; pinyin: Wú Jìngyù; born February 1, 1987) is a female Chinese Taekwondo practitioner who won gold medals at the 2008 and 2012 Summer Olympics in the –49 kg class. She also won several medals at world championships and Asian Games.

== Biography ==
Wu Jingyu started training in taekwondo aged 13. Her signature moves are axe kicks. As of 2012 she was a student at the Tianjin University of Technology and Suzhou University of Science and Technology. Her hobbies are music, movies and drawing sayings on porcelain. Her hometown in Jiangxi Province is known as "China's porcelain capital", and her uncle is a porcelain maker. She played a young taekwondo fan who dreams of becoming a champion in a Chinese movie on Taekwondo.

== Career ==
In 2006, Wu Jingyu participated in China's first International Open in the 47 kg category and defeated Wang Ying, the world championship champion who was 15 centimeters taller than herself, to win the championship; in October, she won the 51 kg category of the National Championship; on December 8, in Doha In the Asian Games women's 47 kg taekwondo final, she defeated Chinese Taipei star Yang Shujun 2:1, achieving her first international championship and winning the first Asian Games gold medal in history for the Chinese taekwondo team.

In 2007, in the 47 kg final of the National World Championships, Wu Jingyu defeated the Thai star Yao Wapa with an absolute advantage of 5:0 and won the gold medal; in the same year, he won the 47 kg championship at the Beijing World Championships.

In 2008, she participated in the Good Luck Beijing International Invitational Tournament and won the championship in the 49 kg category; she won the championship in the 51 kg category at the National Taekwondo Championships. On April 25, she lost 3-4 to a Chinese Taipei player in the women's 51 kg category at the Asian Taekwondo Championships. Yang Shujun unfortunately won the runner-up.

In 2009, won third place in the 49 kg category at the Copenhagen World Championships.

In 2010, she won the third place in the women's Taekwondo category under 49 kg at the first World Martial Arts Games in Beijing. On November 17, in the 49 kg taekwondo final of the Guangzhou Asian Games, he easily defeated Japanese players and won the championship. On December 5, won the 53 kg championship in the "Glory Walk" Adidas Cup Taekwondo National Championship.

On August 9, 2012, good news came from the taekwondo arena of the London Olympics. In the women's 49 kg final, Chinese star Wu Jingyu easily defeated Spanish player Jager 8-1 and retained the championship in this event.

On August 18, 2016, she missed the women's 49 kg taekwondo medal at the Rio Olympics.

On February 3, 2019, in the women's under 53 kg final of the World Taekwondo Federation Fujairah Open, Wu Jingyu returned from postpartum and defeated her teammate Liu Kaiqi 26:2 to win the championship in her debut. On April 28, 2019, in the women's under-49 kg final of the 2019 World Taekwondo Grand Slam Championship Series Spring Qualifications, Wu Jingyu defeated South Korean player Jiang Baola 9:5 and 18:4 in two games to win the title. Win the championship. On October 21, in the women's 49 kg final of the 2019 World Taekwondo Grand Prix Sofia Station, Wu Jingyu defeated the Rio Olympic champion Kim So-hee of South Korea 24:8, and once again won the highest award of the World Taekwondo Grand Prix after 4 years. tower. On December 7, in the women's 49 kg final of the 2019 World Taekwondo Grand Prix Finals held in Moscow, Russia, Wu Jingyu lost to Serbian player Bogdanovic and won the runner-up. On December 19, in the women's 49 kg final of the 2019 World Taekwondo Grand Slam Championship Series held in Wuxi, Jiangsu, Wu Jingyu lost to Thailand's Ongpadanaji and won the runner-up.

On July 14, 2021, Wu Jingyu was selected into the list of taekwondo athletes for the Chinese Sports Delegation at the 2020 Tokyo Olympics.

On July 24, in the quarter-finals of the women's 49 kg taekwondo category at the Tokyo Olympics, Wu Jingyu unexpectedly lost to Spanish player Cerezo by a score difference. In the subsequent rematch, Wu Jingyu lost to Serbian player Bodanovic 9-12 and missed the opportunity to compete for his third Olympic medal.

On February 3, 2022, Wu Jingyu became the torchbearer of the Beijing Winter Olympics and participated in the Winter Olympics torch relay at Badaling Great Wall.

On June 25, 2023, the first Olympic e-sports week entered the final day of competition. In the competition of the Taekwondo event "Virtual Taekwondo", two-time Olympic champion and Chinese star Wu Jingyu won the third place. At the same time, this bronze medal is also the first medal won by the Chinese delegation in the history of Olympic esports.

On June 30, 2023, according to the World Taekwondo Federation, Wu Jingyu was elected as the co-chairman of the World Taekwondo Athletes Committee In September, he served as an arbitration committee member at the 19th Asian Games in Hangzhou.

== See also ==
- China at the 2012 Summer Olympics#Taekwondo
- Taekwondo at the 2012 Summer Olympics - Women's 49 kg
- List of Olympic medalists in taekwondo
