= Ha Min-ah =

South Korean taekwondo practitioner

Personal information
- Nationality: South Korean
- Born: 9 November 1995 (age 30)

Sport
- Sport: Taekwondo
Medal record
Representing South Korea
Women's taekwondo
World Championships
Gold medal – first place	2015 Chelyabinsk	Flyweight
Asian Championships
Gold medal – first place	2018 Ho Chi Minh City	Bantamweight
Silver medal – second place	2016 Manila	Flyweight

Ha Min-ah (born 9 November 1995) is a South Korean taekwondo practitioner.

Ha won a gold medal in flyweight division at the 2015 World Taekwondo Championships in Chelyabinsk, a gold medal in the bantamweight division at the 2018 Asian Taekwondo Championships in Ho Chi Minh City, and a silver medal in flyweight division at the 2016 Asian Taekwondo Championships.
