= Iryna Romoldanova =

Ukrainian taekwondo practitioner

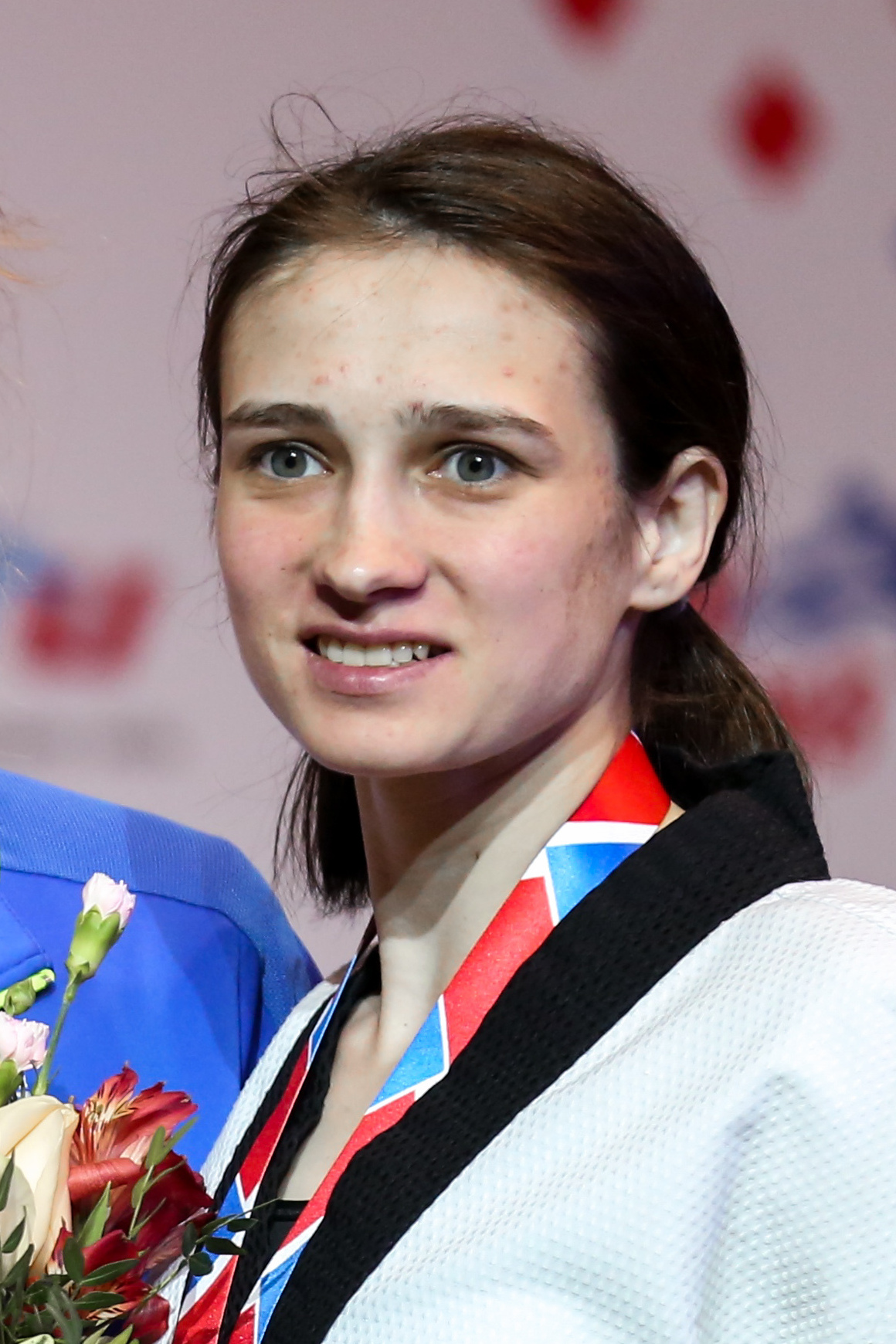

Personal information
- Nationality: Ukrainian
- Born: 29 May 1994 (age 32)

Sport
- Country: Ukraine
- Sport: Taekwondo
- Event: –46 kg
- Coached by: Oleg Nam
Medal record
Representing Ukraine
World Championships
Silver medal – second place	2015 Chelyabinsk	Finweight
European Championships
Gold medal – first place	2016 Montreux	Finweight
Silver medal – second place	2014 Baku	Finweight
Bronze medal – third place	2018 Kazan	Finweight
Universiade
Gold medal – first place	2017 Taipei	Finweight
Bronze medal – third place	2019 Naples	Finweight
Youth Olympic Games
Silver medal – second place	2010 Singapore	–44 kg

Iryna Romoldanova (Ukrainian: Ірина Ромолданова; born 29 May 1994 in Kyiv) is a Ukrainian taekwondo practitioner.

== Career ==
Romoldanova won the silver medal in the women's Finweight class at the 2015 World Taekwondo Championships.

In 2017, Romoldanova won the gold medal in the women's Finweight class at the Summer Universiade in Taipei.
