= Dana Haidar =

Jordanian taekwondo practitioner

Medal record

Women's taekwondo

Representing Jordan

World Championships
Silver medal – second place	2013 Puebla	Flyweight

Asian Games
Silver medal – second place	2010 Guangzhou	Finweight

Asian Championships
Bronze medal – third place	2010 Astana	Finweight

Youth Olympic Games
Silver medal – second place	2010 Singapore	49 kg

Dana Haidar Touran (Arabic: دانا حيدر توران, born January 30, 1993) is a Jordanian of Circassian ancestry taekwondo practitioner. She won the silver medal at the 2010 Asian Games Taekwondo Competition.
