= 2023 World Taekwondo Championships – Men's flyweight =

Taekwondo competitions

Men's flyweight at the 2023 World Championships
- Venue: Baku Crystal Hall
- Dates: 30 May 2023
- Competitors: 70 from 67 nations

Medalists
gold medal	Bae Jun-seo	South Korea
silver medal	Georgii Gurtsiev	Individual Neutral Athletes
bronze medal	Mahmoud Al-Taryreh	Jordan
bronze medal	Adrián Vicente	Spain

The men's flyweight is a competition featured at the 2023 World Taekwondo Championships, and was held at the Baku Crystal Hall in Baku, Azerbaijan on 30 May 2023. Flyweights were limited to a maximum of 58 kilograms in body mass.

== Results ==
Legend

- DQ — Won by disqualification
- P — Won by punitive declaration
- W — Won by withdrawal

=== Finals ===
Quarterfinals				Semifinals			Final
Vito Dell'Aquila (ITA)	4	0
Mahmoud Al-Taryreh (JOR)	16	8^{W}		Mahmoud Al-Taryreh (JOR)	7	8
Nouridine Issaka (NIG)	0	11	5	Georgii Gurtsiev (AIN)	12	12
Georgii Gurtsiev (AIN)	4	5	7				Georgii Gurtsiev (AIN)	2	5
Ömer Faruk Dayıoğlu (TUR)	5	12	12				Bae Jun-seo (KOR)	10	15
Adrián Vicente (ESP)	7	5	14	Adrián Vicente (ESP)	6	4
Bae Jun-seo (KOR)	7	9	11	Bae Jun-seo (KOR)	10	8
Mohamed Khalil Jendoubi (TUN)	7	0	8

=== Top half ===
==== Section 1 ====
Round of 128
Mahdi Khavari (RTA)	12	20
Jopiza Gnolo (CMR)	0	6

Round of 64
Vito Dell'Aquila (ITA)	10	10
Mahdi Khavari (RTA)	4	6
Vicente Pizarro (CHI)	9	4
Alireza Hosseinpour (IRI)	11	11
Omar Salim (HUN)	15	13
Aroune Ipopa (GAB)	3	1
Braven Park (CAN)	4	7
Jefferson Ochoa (COL)	3	2

Round of 32
Vito Dell'Aquila (ITA)	11	4
Alireza Hosseinpour (IRI)	9	2
Omar Salim (HUN)	16	18
Braven Park (CAN)	15	4

Round of 16
Vito Dell'Aquila (ITA)	10	7
Omar Salim (HUN)	2	7

==== Section 2 ====
Round of 128

Round of 64
Issa Diakité (CIV)	1	2
Enis Calik (GER)	1	2
Chiok Chun Yin (HKG)	1	6
Mohsen Rezaee (AFG)	12	19
Mahmoud Al-Taryreh (JOR)	9	15
Youssouf Simpara (MLI)	6	8
Ernest Merdanaj (ALB)	4	11	2
Dionysios Rapsomanikis (GRE)	4	10	14

Round of 32
Issa Diakité (CIV)	16	10
Mohsen Rezaee (AFG)	5	8
Mahmoud Al-Taryreh (JOR)	16	7
Dionysios Rapsomanikis (GRE)	7	5

Round of 16
Issa Diakité (CIV)	4	11	9
Mahmoud Al-Taryreh (JOR)	14	10	9

==== Section 3 ====
Round of 128
Moktar Youssouf (DJI)	6	11	8
Ali Al-Mershad (KUW)	13	7	9

Round of 64
Cyrian Ravet (FRA)	16	14
Ali Al-Mershad (KUW)	4	1
Edrick Morales (PUR)	15	12
David Fuentes (GUA)	14	0
Aymen Achnine (NED)	8	9
Hristo Bogdanov (BUL)	20	18
Dex Ian Chavez (PHI)	4	3
Nouridine Issaka (NIG)	8	14

Round of 32
Cyrian Ravet (FRA)	13	14
Edrick Morales (PUR)	0	1
Hristo Bogdanov (BUL)	3	8
Nouridine Issaka (NIG)	10	11

Round of 16
Cyrian Ravet (FRA)	12	5	4
Nouridine Issaka (NIG)	0	5	7

==== Section 4 ====
Round of 128
Cheng Kai (CHN)	9	8
Denis Bllaca (KOS)	3	1

Round of 64
Mostafa Mansour (EGY)	12	12
Tatenda Bero (ZIM)	0	0
Uroš Belanović (SRB)	6	10
Haroon Khan (PAK)	14	17
Omar Hantoli (PLE)	10	0
Georgii Gurtsiev (AIN)	12	12
Cheng Kai (CHN)	10	14
Gashim Magomedov (AZE)	5	13

Round of 32
Mostafa Mansour (EGY)	14	2	4
Haroon Khan (PAK)	11	15	16
Georgii Gurtsiev (AIN)	13	18
Cheng Kai (CHN)	0	9

Round of 16
Haroon Khan (PAK)	4	1
Georgii Gurtsiev (AIN)	7	14

=== Bottom half ===
==== Section 5 ====
Round of 128
Sainbilegiin Gan-Erdene (MGL)	14	12
Muath Ebrahim Mohammed (BRN)	5	5

Round of 64
Jack Woolley (IRL)	7	17	17
Sainbilegiin Gan-Erdene (MGL)	9	16	4
Huang Yu-xiang (TPE)	13	18
Dmitriy Nagaev (ISR)	6	13
Mohammed Nour (GBR)	13^{P}	11^{P}
Isaac Myrie (SOL)	1	2
Niraj Chaudhari (IND)	10	5	0
Ömer Faruk Dayıoğlu (TUR)	6	11	6

Round of 32
Jack Woolley (IRL)	2	10	14
Huang Yu-xiang (TPE)	10	3	1
Mohammed Nour (GBR)	11	6	5
Ömer Faruk Dayıoğlu (TUR)	10	8	15

Round of 16
Jack Woolley (IRL)	4	11
Ömer Faruk Dayıoğlu (TUR)	8	11

==== Section 6 ====
Round of 128
~~Woobens Cazeau (HAI)~~
Jan Flegar (CRO)	D	Q

Round of 64
Bailey Lewis (AUS)	6	15
Josef Alami (SWE)	1	3
Amirbek Turaev (UZB)	7	11
Serghei Uscov (MDA)	0	0
Matheus Bartholo (BRA)	1	6
Casimir Betel (CHA)	6	8
Jan Flegar (CRO)	3	1
Adrián Vicente (ESP)	8	13

Round of 32
Bailey Lewis (AUS)	0	5	4
Amirbek Turaev (UZB)	0	4	2
Casimir Betel (CHA)	1	3
Adrián Vicente (ESP)	13	8

Round of 16
Bailey Lewis (AUS)	0	3
Adrián Vicente (ESP)	5	4

==== Section 7 ====
Round of 128

Round of 64
Brandon Plaza (MEX)	6	15
Chalinda Liyanage (SRI)	3	2
Cole Krech-Watene (NZL)	0	2
Lucas Guzmán (ARG)	5	8
Thanakrit Yodrak (THA)	14	11^{P}
Fahad Al-Samih (KSA)	2	5
Viacheslav Bovkun (AIN)	8	0
Bae Jun-seo (KOR)	13	12

Round of 32
Brandon Plaza (MEX)	2	2
Lucas Guzmán (ARG)	2	8
Thanakrit Yodrak (THA)	0	1
Bae Jun-seo (KOR)	10^{P}	9

Round of 16
Lucas Guzmán (ARG)	1	10
Bae Jun-seo (KOR)	4	11

==== Section 8 ====
Round of 128
Niko Saarinen (FIN)	0	10	5
Aidin Altybaev (KGZ)	0	1	10

Round of 64
William Cunningham (USA)	5	16
Seiya Higashijima (JPN)	3	4
Seifeddine Medjahed (ALG)	1	0
Samirkhon Ababakirov (KAZ)	4	10
Raphael Koudsi (LBN)	2	2	4
Rui Bragança (POR)	2	3	3
Aidin Altybaev (KGZ)	1	1
Mohamed Khalil Jendoubi (TUN)	13^{P}	13

Round of 32
William Cunningham (USA)	4	3
Samirkhon Ababakirov (KAZ)	12	10
Raphael Koudsi (LBN)	2	2
Mohamed Khalil Jendoubi (TUN)	11^{P}	14

Round of 16
Samirkhon Ababakirov (KAZ)	0	2
Mohamed Khalil Jendoubi (TUN)	5	5
