= 2022 World Taekwondo Championships – Men's flyweight =

Taekwondo competitions

Men's flyweight at the 2022 World Championships
- Venue: Centro Acuático CODE Metropolitano
- Dates: 20 November 2022
- Competitors: 52 from 51 nations

Medalists
gold medal	Vito Dell'Aquila	Italy
silver medal	Jang Jun	South Korea
bronze medal	Brandon Plaza	Mexico
bronze medal	Mohamed Khalil Jendoubi	Tunisia

The men's flyweight is a competition featured at the 2022 World Taekwondo Championships, and was held at the Centro Acuático CODE Metropolitano in Guadalajara, Mexico on 20 November 2022. Flyweights were limited to a maximum of 58 kilograms in body mass.

== Results ==
Legend

- DQ — Won by disqualification
- P — Won by punitive declaration

=== Finals ===
Semifinals			Final
Vito Dell'Aquila (ITA)	6	16
Brandon Plaza (MEX)	0	3	Vito Dell'Aquila (ITA)	11	13	13
Mohamed Khalil Jendoubi (TUN)	1	3	Jang Jun (KOR)	12	4	6
Jang Jun (KOR)	2	4

=== Top half ===
==== Section 1 ====
Round of 64
~~Casimir Betel (CHA)~~
Riad Hamdi (KSA)	D	Q
Juliano Lima (BRA)	6	13
Gregory Jean-Baptiste (HAI)	0	1
Cristopher Espinoza (HON)	0	0
Mostafa Mansour (EGY)	8	9
Joshua Klaber (ARU)	0	0
Samirkhon Ababakirov (KAZ)	6	13
Thanakrit Yodrak (THA)	D	Q
~~Gasto Nsazimukiza (RTA)~~

Round of 32
Vito Dell'Aquila (ITA)	7	9
Riad Hamdi (KSA)	3	2
Juliano Lima (BRA)	0	3
Mostafa Mansour (EGY)	8	7
Dionysios Rapsomanikis (GRE)	1	4
Samirkhon Ababakirov (KAZ)	3	18
Thanakrit Yodrak (THA)	10	10^{P}
Bailey Lewis (AUS)	7	7

Round of 16
Vito Dell'Aquila (ITA)	8	8
Mostafa Mansour (EGY)	0	0
Samirkhon Ababakirov (KAZ)	8	6
Thanakrit Yodrak (THA)	3	2

Quarterfinals
Vito Dell'Aquila (ITA)	8	4	7
Samirkhon Ababakirov (KAZ)	13	3	2

==== Section 2 ====
Round of 64
Huang Yu-xiang (TPE)	11	13
Jorge Ramos (CHI)	1	5
Yohan Chang (CAN)	D	Q
~~Sebastián Robles (BOL)~~
Yohandri Granado (VEN)	2	0
Amirbek Turaev (UZB)	3	5
Devonte Lopes (CPV)	0	0
Sharif Salim (HUN)	12	12
Hidetaka Maeda (JPN)	15	14
Youssouf Simpara (MLI)	2	1

Round of 32
Jack Woolley (IRL)	3	4	8
Huang Yu-xiang (TPE)	3	0	5
Yohan Chang (CAN)	10	8
Issa Diakité (CIV)	5	7
Amirbek Turaev (UZB)	6	2
Sharif Salim (HUN)	8	4
Hidetaka Maeda (JPN)	4	0
Brandon Plaza (MEX)	6	13

Round of 16
Jack Woolley (IRL)	16	18	28
Yohan Chang (CAN)	11	20	21
Sharif Salim (HUN)	8	15
Brandon Plaza (MEX)	12	22

Quarterfinals
Jack Woolley (IRL)	6	6
Brandon Plaza (MEX)	11	10

=== Bottom half ===
==== Section 3 ====
Round of 64
Pablo Solano (CRC)	1	6
Serghei Uscov (MDA)	13	10
Mohammed Nour (GBR)	14	11	13
Aroune Ipopa (GAB)	5^{P}	1	3
~~Tyron Moores-Duffield (SOM)~~
Jefferson Ochoa (COL)	D	Q
Geraldo Rodríguez (DOM)	3	0
Görkem Polat (TUR)	5	8
David Fuentes (GUA)	1	0
Hossein Lotfi (IRI)	9	12

Round of 32
Mohamed Khalil Jendoubi (TUN)	12	14
Serghei Uscov (MDA)	7	1
Mohammed Nour (GBR)	11	13
Jefferson Ochoa (COL)	6	3
Omar Lakehal (MAR)	0	4	8
Görkem Polat (TUR)	7	3	8
Hossein Lotfi (IRI)	1	20	14
Adrián Vicente (ESP)	3	13	9

Round of 16
Mohamed Khalil Jendoubi (TUN)	9	13
Mohammed Nour (GBR)	3	2
Omar Lakehal (MAR)	10	2
Hossein Lotfi (IRI)	10	9

Quarterfinals
Mohamed Khalil Jendoubi (TUN)	3	8
Hossein Lotfi (IRI)	1	6

==== Section 4 ====
Round of 64
Chiok Chun Yin (HKG)	7	15^{P}
Cemal Can Malkoç (GER)	0	4
Dmitriy Nagaev (ISR)	7	7
Ángel Martínez (PUR)	2	1
Nouridine Issaka (NIG)	D	Q
~~Joseph Mwanda (KEN)~~
~~Salia Soumah (GUI)~~
William Cunningham (USA)	D	Q
Mark Khalife (LBN)	D	Q
~~Benson Addo (GHA)~~

Round of 32
Cyrian Ravet (FRA)	12	15
Chiok Chun Yin (HKG)	5	8
Dmitriy Nagaev (ISR)	2	1
Gashim Magomedov (AZE)	13	10
Nouridine Issaka (NIG)	9	8
William Cunningham (USA)	4	5
Mark Khalife (LBN)	5	2
Jang Jun (KOR)	6	8

Round of 16
Cyrian Ravet (FRA)	6	6
Gashim Magomedov (AZE)	6	6
Nouridine Issaka (NIG)	2	13
Jang Jun (KOR)	5	21

Quarterfinals
Gashim Magomedov (AZE)	1	5
Jang Jun (KOR)	3	6
