= 2025 World Taekwondo Championships – Men's bantamweight =

Taekwondo competitions

Men's bantamweight at the 2025 World Championships
- Venue: Taihu International Expo Center
- Dates: 25 October 2025
- Competitors: 69 from 67 nations

Medalists
gold medal	Mohamed Khalil Jendoubi	Tunisia
silver medal	Mehdi Haji Mousaei	Iran
bronze medal	Mahmoud Al-Taryreh	Jordan
bronze medal	Jang Jun	South Korea

The men's bantamweight competition at the 2025 World Taekwondo Championships was held on 24 October 2025 in Wuxi, China. Bantamweights were limited to a maximum of 63 kilograms in body mass.

== Results ==
Legend

- DQ — Won by disqualification
- P — Won by punitive declaration
- R — Won by referee stop contest
- W — Won by withdrawal

=== Finals ===
Quarterfinals
Samirkhon Ababakirov (KAZ)	4	4	3
Mohamed Khalil Jendoubi (TUN)	6	2	11
Mahmoud Al-Taryreh (JOR)	13	12	1^{DQ}
Liang Yushuai (CHN)	1	14	2
Kristian Borgen (NOR)	0	8
Mehdi Haji Mousaei (IRI)	12	9
Nazarali Nazarov (UZB)	1	7	4
Jang Jun (KOR)	1	6	4

Semifinals
Mohamed Khalil Jendoubi (TUN)	W
Mahmoud Al-Taryreh (JOR)
Mehdi Haji Mousaei (IRI)	9	4	8
Jang Jun (KOR)	7	4	6

Final
Mohamed Khalil Jendoubi (TUN)	1^{R}
Mehdi Haji Mousaei (IRI)	1

=== Top half ===
==== Section 1 ====
Round of 128
Atiola Vitapa (TGA)	0	4
Karl Bayne (NZL)	14	13^{P}

Round of 64
Samirkhon Ababakirov (KAZ)	11	15
Karl Bayne (NZL)	0	0
Ahmed Hisham (EGY)	7	7
Chan Kin Fung (HKG)	3	4
Omar Hantoli (PLE)	4	8
Alejandro Castillo (PER)	1	5
Leonard Daxner (AUT)	2	5
Bocar Diop (SEN)	14	11

Round of 32
Samirkhon Ababakirov (KAZ)	6	11
Ahmed Hisham (EGY)	2	2
Omar Hantoli (PLE)	2	5
Bocar Diop (SEN)	4	10^{R}

Round of 16
Samirkhon Ababakirov (KAZ)	12	12
Bocar Diop (SEN)	0	1

==== Section 2 ====
Round of 128

Round of 64
Omar Salim (HUN)	19	15
Edo Miyaguchi (FPO)	5	1
Ioannis Pilavakis (CYP)	5	1
Yohandri Granado (VEN)	9	5
Maksim Osin (AIN)	12	12
Alfredo Martins (POR)	0	0
Bendjino Misiedjan (SUR)	3	3
Mohamed Khalil Jendoubi (TUN)	16	15

Round of 32
Omar Salim (HUN)	9	12
Yohandri Granado (VEN)	9	0
Maksim Osin (AIN)	9	1
Mohamed Khalil Jendoubi (TUN)	10	4

Round of 16
Omar Salim (HUN)	1	10
Mohamed Khalil Jendoubi (TUN)	13	11

==== Section 3 ====
Round of 128
Fergeson Galea (MLT)	2	6
Fernando Lewis (PAN)	4	10

Round of 64
Adrián Vicente (ESP)	7	12^{P}
Fernando Lewis (PAN)	2	1
Matthew Summerfield (AUS)	13	14
Zakariya Ghali (KSA)	1	2
Mahmoud Al-Taryreh (JOR)	15	7
Uroš Belanović (SRB)	6	1
Muhammad Bassam Raihan (INA)	3	3	0
Napat Sritimongkol (THA)	5	0	4

Round of 32
Adrián Vicente (ESP)	8	7
Matthew Summerfield (AUS)	10	12
Mahmoud Al-Taryreh (JOR)	8	4
Napat Sritimongkol (THA)	2	3

Round of 16
Matthew Summerfield (AUS)	2	9
Mahmoud Al-Taryreh (JOR)	3	18

==== Section 4 ====
Round of 128
Arun Tomata (NEP)	7	1
Deepanshu Jaat (IND)	14	7

Round of 64
Cyrian Ravet (FRA)	13	14
Georgios Gerardis (GRE)	6	1
Shane Britton (CAN)	1	4
Huang Cho-cheng (TPE)	4	10
Fuad Tahmazov (AZE)	21	12	16
Regan Chin (SGP)	15	10^{P}	4
Deepanshu Jaat (IND)	0	6
Liang Yushuai (CHN)	6	9

Round of 32
Cyrian Ravet (FRA)	2	6
Huang Cho-cheng (TPE)	2	2
Fuad Tahmazov (AZE)	0	0
Liang Yushuai (CHN)	7	13

Round of 16
Cyrian Ravet (FRA)	2	1	10
Liang Yushuai (CHN)	3	0	15

=== Bottom half ===
==== Section 5 ====
Round of 128
Lê Tuấn (VIE)	5	3
Kenneth Buenavides (PHI)	10	12

Round of 64
Kristian Borgen (NOR)	14	9
Kenneth Buenavides (PHI)	2	3
David Valdés (MEX)	6	4	3
Joep van Limpt (NED)	13	2	5
Imran Özkaya (GER)	9	2
Issa Diakité (CIV)	13	3
Ilya Vodovozov (USA)	1	3
Samir Mirzoiev (UKR)	9	7

Round of 32
Kristian Borgen (NOR)	8	6
Joep van Limpt (NED)	6	5
Issa Diakité (CIV)	0	0
Samir Mirzoiev (UKR)	9	3

Round of 16
Kristian Borgen (NOR)	7	9	15^{P}
Samir Mirzoiev (UKR)	11	8	6

==== Section 6 ====
Round of 128

Round of 64
Mehdi Haji Mousaei (IRI)	15	8
Jamie McIntosh (GBR)	2	0
Ernest Merdanaj (ALB)	8	7
Dominik Papierowski (POL)	0	5
Ibrahim Đonko (BIH)	2	5	3
Maksim Bandarevich (AIN)	8	4	6
Abraheem Mansour (LBA)	5	0
Ömer Faruk Dayıoğlu (TUR)	8^{P}	12

Round of 32
Mehdi Haji Mousaei (IRI)	8	17
Ernest Merdanaj (ALB)	1	2
Maksim Bandarevich (AIN)	12	0	3
Ömer Faruk Dayıoğlu (TUR)	11	12	12^{P}

Round of 16
Mehdi Haji Mousaei (IRI)	14	10
Ömer Faruk Dayıoğlu (TUR)	12	3

==== Section 7 ====
Round of 128

Round of 64
Hidetaka Maeda (JPN)	7	13	7
Ángel Sánchez (COL)	11	1	8
Sebastián Navea (CHI)	9	8	4
Jan Flegar (CRO)	8	9	3
Nazarali Nazarov (UZB)	12	6
Dashdavaagiin Chinzorig (MGL)	0	1
Mauricio Ramírez (ECU)	5	3
Jack Woolley (IRL)	12	15

Round of 32
Ángel Sánchez (COL)	2	0
Sebastián Navea (CHI)	6	9
Nazarali Nazarov (UZB)	1	6	3
Jack Woolley (IRL)	8	2	3

Round of 16
Sebastián Navea (CHI)	0	4
Nazarali Nazarov (UZB)	6	6

==== Section 8 ====
Round of 128
Derrick Swaray (LBR)	3	2
Lam Mun Chok (MAC)	8	14

Round of 64
Dennis Baretta (ITA)	7	0
Eitan Genzel (ISR)	3	0
Mohsen Rezaee (AFG)	0	0
Guilherme Morais (BRA)	4	11
Maman Mansour Chipkaou (NIG)	6	3	7
Valton Ademi (KOS)	3	5^{P}	2
Lam Mun Chok (MAC)	0	0
Jang Jun (KOR)	13	8

Round of 32
Dennis Baretta (ITA)	3	2	8
Guilherme Morais (BRA)	2	6	10
Maman Mansour Chipkaou (NIG)	4	3
Jang Jun (KOR)	11	14

Round of 16
Guilherme Morais (BRA)	0	0
Jang Jun (KOR)	5	12
