= Park Tae-joon (taekwondo) =

South Korean taekwondo athlete (born 2004)

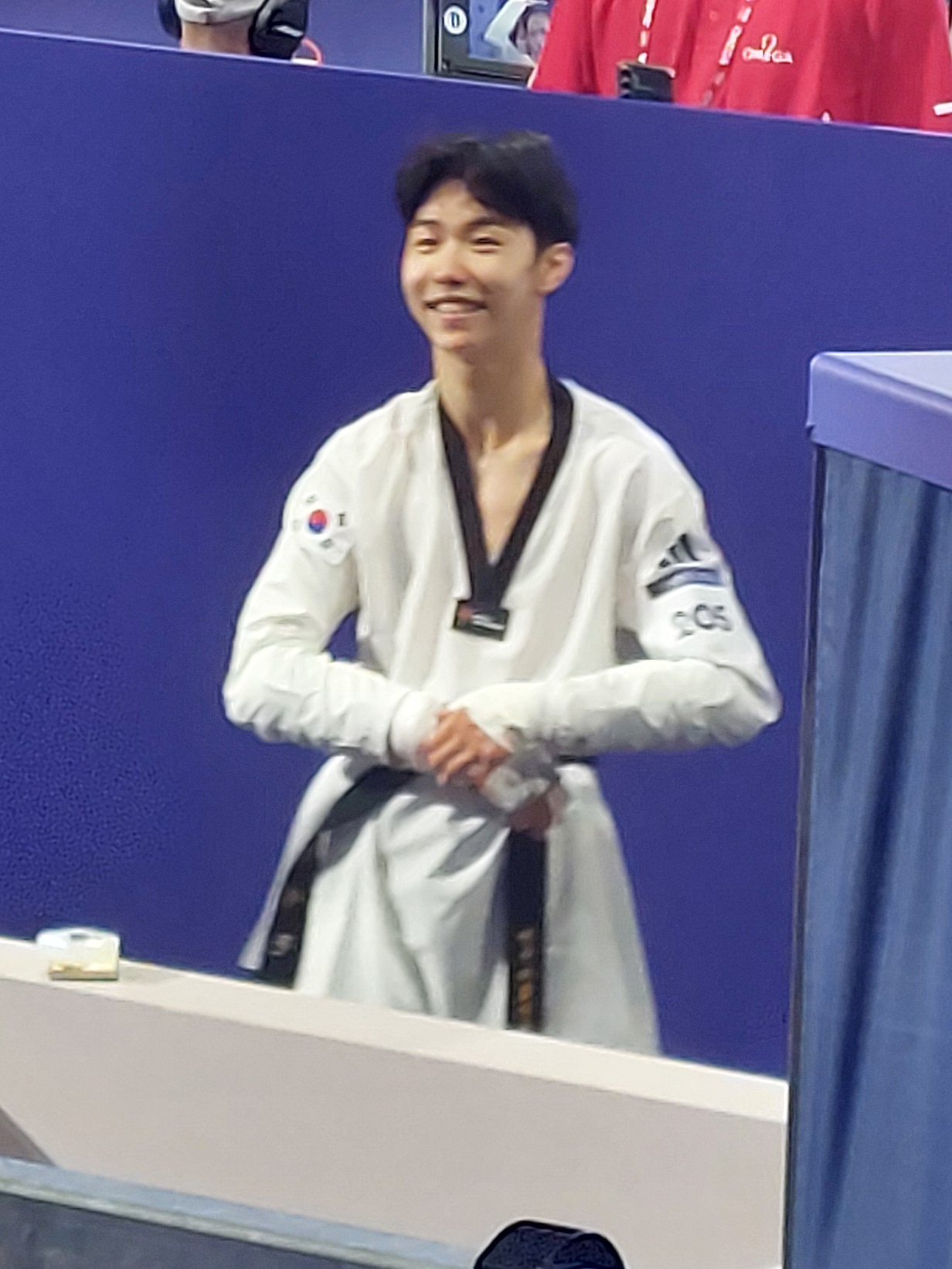
- Park at the 2024 Summer Olympics

Personal information
- Nationality: South Korea
- Born: 6 June 2004 (age 22) Ulsan, South Korea
- Height: 180 cm (5 ft 11 in)

Sport
- Sport: Taekwondo
- Events: 54 kg, 58 kg
- University team: Kyung Hee University
Medal record
Men's taekwondo
Representing South Korea
Olympic Games
Gold medal – first place	2024 Paris	58 kg
World Championships
Gold medal – first place	2023 Baku	54 kg
Grand Prix
Gold medal – first place	2022 Manchester	58 kg
Bronze medal – third place	2023 Taiyuan	58 kg
Bronze medal – third place	2025 Bangkok	58 kg
Silver medal – second place	2026 Muju	58 kg
Silver medal – second place	2026 Paris	58 kg
Grand Slam Challenge
Gold medal – first place	2025 Wuxi	58 kg
Asian Championships
Gold medal – first place	2022 Chuncheon	54 kg
Silver medal – second place	2024 Da Nang	54 kg
WT Presidents Cup
Bronze medal – third place	2026 Lahore	58 kg
Silver medal – second place	2023 Amman	58 kg
Chuncheon Korean Open
Gold medal – first place	2025 Chuncheon	58 kg
Gold medal – first place	2022 Chuncheon	58 kg
Canada Open
Gold medal – first place	2023 Vancouver	58 kg
US Open
Gold medal – first place	2023 Las Vegas	58 kg
Altaic Taekwondo Championships
Gold medal – first place	2026 Astana	58 kg
Kazakhstan Open
Gold medal – first place	2026 Kazakhstan	63 kg
Asian Junior Championships
Gold medal – first place	2019 Amman	45 kg
- Updated on 6th September 2026

Park Tae-joon (Korean: 박태준; born 6 June 2004) is a South Korean taekwondo athlete. He won a gold medal in his World Taekwondo Championships debut in the 2023 World Taekwondo Championships held in Baku, Azerbaijan.

Park participated in the 2024 Summer Olympics held in Paris, France, where he won the gold medal in the men's flyweight (-58 kg) event.

In the most recent 2024 March World Taekwondo ranking, Park is ranked 1st in the men's -54 kg (finweight) World Kyorugi Category, and is ranked 5th in the men's -58 kg (flyweight) Olympic Kyorugi Category.

== Career ==
=== Cadet ===
In 2016, Park won a gold medal at the Russian Open Tournament in the Cadet Male flyweight (-37 kg) event.

=== Junior ===
In 2019, Park won a gold medal at the Asian Junior Championships in the Juniors Male finweight (-45 kg) event. Wuhoo

=== Senior ===
In 2022, Park won his first gold medal in the Senior category at the 2022 Asian Taekwondo Championships in the Men's finweight (-54 kg) event. He also won gold medals that year at the Korea Taekwondo Open Tournament held in Chuncheon, in the men's finweight (-54 kg) event, and at the 2022 World Taekwondo Grand Prix held in Manchester, in the men's flyweight (-58 kg) event.

In February 2023, Park won a gold medal in the Canada Taekwondo Open Tournament held in Vancouver, in the men's flyweight (-58 kg) event. In March, he won a gold medal at the US Taekwondo Open Tournament held in Las Vegas, in the men's flyweight (-58 kg) event. He later won a gold medal at the 2023 World Taekwondo Championships in June, his first senior category World Championships in the men's finweight (-54 kg) event. He was given the men's most valuable player award, as a recognition of his outstanding performance during the Championships.

In October 2023, Park participated in Series 3 of the Grand Prix Series and won a bronze medal after losing a fight of 2-1 against Mohamed Khalil Jendoubi. In February 2024, he won a gold medal in the 2024 Paris Olympics dispatch national team selection, thus qualifying to compete in the Olympics in the men's flyweight (-58 kg) event. He defeated a previous Olympic medalist, Jang Jun, 2-0 to qualify.

During the 2024 Summer Olympics, Park won a gold medal in the men's 58 kg category. He defeated Mohamed Khalil Jendoubi of Tunisia and Gashim Magomedov of Azerbaijan. His win has been described as an upswing for South Korea, as it did not win any Taekwondo gold medals while participating in the 2020 Summer Olympics.

Park won gold in the men's -58 kg category for the 2025 Chuncheon Korean Open, defeating Yang Hui Chan. He also won gold in the 2025 World Taekwondo Grand Slam Challenge in Wuxi after his opponent was forced to withdraw due to injury. During the 2025 World Grand Prix Challenge in Bangkok, Park won bronze in the mens -58 kg weight class after his opponent pulled out of the fight due to an injury he had sustained earlier.

In 2026, Park won back to back gold medals in the men's -58 kg category at the Altaic Taekwondo Championships and the men's -63kg category at the Kazakhstan Open. He won bronze at the 2026 WT President's Cup Asia, losing the semifinals to Abofazl Zandi. He also fought at the Roma 2026 World Taekwondo Grand Prix in the men's -58 kg division, going down in the quarter final to eventual gold medallist Vito Dell'Aquila. However, later in the year at the Muju Taekwondowon 2026 World Taekwondo Grand Prix series, he defeated Vito in the semifinals of the men's -58 kg event, before losing by 1 point in the final match against three-time world champion, Bae Jun Seo. In October, he won silver at the 2026 Paris Grand Prix, again losing to Zandi.
