= Tunisia at the 2024 Summer Olympics =

- IOC code: TUN
- NOC: Tunisian Olympic Committee
- Website: www.cnot.org.tn (in French)

in Paris, France 26 July 2024 – 11 August 2024
- Competitors: 27 (13 men and 14 women) in 13 sports
- Flag bearers: Salim Jemai & Khadija Krimi
- Medals Ranked 52nd: Gold 1 Silver 1 Bronze 1 Total 3

Summer Olympics appearances (overview)
- 1960; 1964; 1968; 1972; 1976; 1980; 1984; 1988; 1992; 1996; 2000; 2004; 2008; 2012; 2016; 2020; 2024; 2028

Tunisia competed at the 2024 Summer Olympics in Paris from 26 July to 11 August 2024. Since the nation's official debut in 1960, Tunisian athletes have appeared in every edition of the Summer Olympic Games, except for Moscow 1980 as part of the United States-led boycott.

On 30 April 2024, the World Anti-Doping Agency imposed sanctions on Tunisia due to non-compliance of its regulations on 30 August which meant that the Tunisian flag would not have been allowed to be used at the Games. The sanction was eventually lifted on 15 May, prior to the start of the games, after the head of Tunisia's anti-doping commission was removed.

As of 9 August 2024, Tunisia has three medals at the Games, with Farès Ferjani winning silver in the individual men's sabre event and Mohamed Khalil Jendoubi capturing the bronze in the men's 58 kg event, the latter becoming the first Tunisian to score back-to-back medals in taekwondo during the Olympics. Firas Katoussi would follow suit with the country's first gold medal in the Taekwondo men's 80 kg event.

== Medalists ==
Medal	Name	Sport	Event	Date
Gold	Firas Katoussi	Taekwondo	Men's 80 kg	9 August
Silver	Farès Ferjani	Fencing	Men's sabre	27 July
Bronze	Mohamed Khalil Jendoubi	Taekwondo	Men's 58 kg	7 August

Medals by sport
Sport	1st place, gold medalist(s)	2nd place, silver medalist(s)	3rd place, bronze medalist(s)	Total
Fencing	0	1	0	1
Taekwondo	1	0	1	2
Total	1	1	1	3

Medals by gender
Gender	1st place, gold medalist(s)	2nd place, silver medalist(s)	3rd place, bronze medalist(s)	Total
Male	1	1	1	3
Female	0	0	0	0
Mixed	0	0	0	0
Total	1	1	1	3

Medals by date
Date	1st place, gold medalist(s)	2nd place, silver medalist(s)	3rd place, bronze medalist(s)	Total
27 July	0	1	0	1
7 August	0	0	1	1
9 August	1	0	0	1
Total	1	1	1	3

== Competitors ==
The following is the list of number of competitors in the Games.

Sport	Men	Women	Total
Archery	0	1	1
Athletics	2	1	3
Boxing	0	1	1
Canoeing	2	0	2
Fencing	1	1	2
Judo	0	2	2
Rowing	1	2	3
Shooting	0	1	1
Swimming	1	1	2
Taekwondo	2	2	4
Tennis	1	0	1
Weightlifting	1	0	1
Wrestling	2	2	4
Total	13	14	27

== Archery ==
One Tunisian archer qualified for the 2024 Summer Olympics women's individual recurve competitions by virtue of her result at the 2023 African Continental Qualification Tournament in Nabeul, Tunisia.

Athlete	Event	Ranking round		Round of 64	Round of 32	Round of 16	Quarterfinals	Semifinals	Final / BM	
Athlete	Event	Score	Seed	Opposition Score	Opposition Score	Opposition Score	Opposition Score	Opposition Score	Opposition Score	Rank
Rihab Elwalid	Women's individual	593	62	Yang (CHN); L 3–7	Did not advance					

== Athletics ==
Tunisian track and field athletes achieved the entry standards for Paris 2024, either by passing the direct qualifying mark (or time for track and road races) or by world ranking, in the following events (a maximum of 3 athletes each):

Key

- Note–Ranks given for track events are within the athlete's heat only
- Q = Qualified for the next round
- q = Qualified for the next round as a fastest loser or, in field events, by position without achieving the qualifying target
- NR = National record
- N/A = Round not applicable for the event
- Bye = Athlete not required to compete in round

Track and road events

Athlete	Event	Heat		Final	
Athlete	Event	Result	Rank	Result	Rank
Ahmed Jaziri	Men's 3000 m steeplechase	8:13.33 SB	5 Q	8:08.02 PB	5
Mohamed Amin Jhinaoui	Men's 3000 m steeplechase	8:25.24	4 Q	8:07.73 NR	4
Marwa Bouzayani	Women's 3000 m steeplechase	9:10.91 PB	6	Did not advance	

== Boxing ==
Khouloud Hlimi (women's featherweight) secured a spot in her division by advancing to the final match at the 2023 African Olympic Qualification Tournament in Dakar, Senegal.

Athlete	Event	Round of 32	Round of 16	Quarterfinals	Semifinals	Final	
Athlete	Event	Opposition Result	Opposition Result	Opposition Result	Opposition Result	Opposition Result	Rank
Khouloud Hlimi	Women's 57 kg	Bye	Yıldız (TUR); L 0–5	Did not advance			

== Canoeing ==
=== Slalom ===
Tunisian canoeists confirmed a boat in the men's K-1 for the Games, following their results as the highest ranked eligible nation's, through the 2024 African Qualification Tournament in Sainte-Suzanne, Réunion, France.

Athlete	Event	Preliminary						Semifinal		Final	
Athlete	Event	Run 1	Rank	Run 2	Rank	Best	Rank	Time	Rank	Time	Rank
Salim Jemai	Men's K-1	101.11	19	90.03	11	90.03	17 Q	106.68	17	Did not advance	

Kayak cross

Athlete	Event	Time trial		Round 1	Repechage	Heat	Quarterfinal	Semifinal	Final	
Athlete	Event	Time	Rank	Position	Position	Position	Position	Position	Position	Rank
Salim Jemai	Men's KX-1	68.91	12	2 Q	Bye	3	Did not advance			18

=== Sprint ===
Tunisian male canoeists qualified one boat for the Games through the result of highest rank eligible nation's in the C-1 1000 metres event at the 2023 African Olympic in Abuja, Nigeria.

Athlete	Event	Heats		Quarterfinals		Semifinals		Final	
Athlete	Event	Time	Rank	Time	Rank	Time	Rank	Time	Rank
Ghailene Khattali	Men's C-1 1000 m	4:23.05	5	4:28.44	5	Did not advance			

Qualification Legend: FA = Qualify to final (medal); FB = Qualify to final B (non-medal)

== Fencing ==
Tunisia entered two fencers into the Olympic competition. Farès Ferjani secured a quota place in men's sabre events, after nominated as one of two highest ranked individuals, eligible for African zone through the release of the FIE Official ranking for Paris 2024. Later on, Yasmine Daghfous, qualified for the games by winning the gold medal in the women's individual sabre events, at the 2024 African Zonal Qualifying Tournament in Algiers, Algeria. Ferjani won silver in the men's sabre event, Tunisia's first medal of the 2024 Games.

Athlete	Event	Round of 64	Round of 32	Round of 16	Quarterfinal	Semifinal	Final / BM	
Athlete	Event	Opposition Score	Opposition Score	Opposition Score	Opposition Score	Opposition Score	Opposition Score	Rank
Farès Ferjani	Men's sabre	Bye	Gu (KOR); W 15–8	Gémesi (HUN); W 15–14	Shen (CHN); W 15–14	El-Sissy (EGY); W 15–11	Oh (KOR); L 15–11	2nd place, silver medalist(s)
Yasmine Daghfous	Women's sabre	Kehli (ALG); W 15–12	Balzer (FRA); L 15–9	Did not advance				

== Judo ==
Tunisia qualified one judoka for the following weight class at the Games. Sarra Mzougui (women's heavyweight, +78 kg) got qualified via continental quota based on Olympic point rankings. Oumaima Bedioui received a quota due to reallocations of Individual Neutral Athletes (AIN).

Athlete	Event	Round of 64	Round of 32	Round of 16	Quarterfinals	Semifinals	Repechage	Final / BM	
Athlete	Event	Opposition Result	Opposition Result	Opposition Result	Opposition Result	Opposition Result	Opposition Result	Opposition Result	Rank
Oumaima Bedioui	Women's 48 kg	—N/a	Hoàng (VIE); W 01–00	Boukli (FRA); L 00–10	Did not advance				
Sarra Mzougui	Women's +78 kg	—N/a	Nunes (POR); L 00–10	Did not advance					

== Rowing ==
Tunisian rowers qualified two boats, each in the women's lightweight double sculls and men's single sculls for the Games through the 2023 African Qualification Regatta in Tunis, Tunisia.

Athlete	Event	Heats		Repechage		Quarterfinals		Semifinals		Final	
Athlete	Event	Time	Rank	Time	Rank	Time	Rank	Time	Rank	Time	Rank
Mohamed Taieb	Men's single sculls	7:10.13	5 R	7:11.57	3 SE/F	—N/a		7:29.64	2 FE	7:00.31	26
Selma Dhaouadi; Khadija Krimi	Women's lightweight double sculls	7:31.19	5 R	7:25.21	3 SA/B	—N/a		7:26.39	6 FB	7:21.65	11

Qualification Legend: FA=Final A (medal); FB=Final B (non-medal); FC=Final C (non-medal); FD=Final D (non-medal); FE=Final E (non-medal); FF=Final F (non-medal); SA/B=Semifinals A/B; SC/D=Semifinals C/D; SE/F=Semifinals E/F; QF=Quarterfinals; R=Repechage

== Shooting ==
Tunisian shooters achieved quota places for the following events based on their results at the 2022 and 2023 ISSF World Championships, 2023 African Championships, and 2024 ISSF World Olympic Qualification Tournament.

Athlete	Event	Qualification		Semifinal		Final	
Athlete	Event	Points	Rank	Points	Rank	Points	Rank
Olfa Charni	Women's 10 m air pistol	565	34	Did not advance			

== Swimming ==
Tunisian swimmers achieved the entry standards in the following events for Paris 2024 (a maximum of two swimmers under the Olympic Qualifying Time (OST) and Universality Place):

Athlete	Event	Heat		Final	
Athlete	Event	Time	Rank	Time	Rank
Ahmed Jaouadi	Men's 400 m freestyle	3:46.19	9	Did not advance	
Ahmed Jaouadi	Men's 800 m freestyle	7:42.07	2 Q	7:42.83	4
Ahmed Jaouadi	Men's 1500 m freestyle	14:44.20	3 Q	14:43.35	6
Ahmed Jaouadi	10 km open water	—N/a		DNS	
Jamila Boulakbech	Women's 800 m freestyle	9:21.38	16	Did not advance	

Qualifiers for the latter rounds (Q) of all events were decided on a time only basis, therefore positions shown are overall results versus competitors in all heats.

== Taekwondo ==
Tunisia qualified four athlete to compete at the games. Tokyo 2020 silver medalist, Mohamed Khalil Jendoubi qualified for Paris 2024 by virtue of finishing within the top five in the Olympic rankings in his division. Meanwhile, Firas Katoussi, Ikram Dhahri & Chaima Toumi joining the squad, by virtue of their victory results in the semifinal round, in their respective division, through 2024 African Qualification Tournament in Dakar, Senegal.

Athlete	Event	Qualification	Round of 16	Quarterfinals	Semifinals	Repechage	Final / BM	
Athlete	Event	Opposition Result	Opposition Result	Opposition Result	Opposition Result	Opposition Result	Opposition Result	Rank
Mohamed Khalil Jendoubi	Men's −58 kg	Bye	Korneev (SRB); W 5–3, 9–3	Lewis (AUS); W 7–4, 6–3	Tae-joon (KOR); L 2–6, 6–13	Bye	Vicente (ESP); W 11–3, 13–2	3rd place, bronze medalist(s)
Firas Katoussi	Men's −80 kg	Bye	Sejranovic (AUS); W 4–0, 7–1	Hrnic (DEN); W 0–0, 6–0	Nickolas (USA); W 0–0, 2–2	Bye	Barkhordari (IRI); W 4–2, 5–1	1st place, gold medalist(s)
Ikram Dhahri	Women's −49 kg	Bye	Souza (MEX); W 0–0, 6–3, 5–5	Stojković (CRO); L 3–3, 3–7, 1–4	Did not advance			
Chaima Toumi	Women's −57 kg	—N/a	Dillon (USA); W 0–3, 4–1, 9–2	Kiani (IRI); L 2–5, 3–0, 2–3	Bye	Alizadeh (BUL); L 2–3, 2–2	Did not advance	5

== Tennis ==
Tunisia entered one tennis players into the Olympic tournament. Moez Echargui secured an outright berth by winning the men's singles title at the 2023 African Games in Accra, Ghana.

Athlete	Event	Round of 64	Round of 32	Round of 16	Quarterfinal	Semifinal	Final / BM	
Athlete	Event	Opposition Result	Opposition Result	Opposition Result	Opposition Result	Opposition Result	Opposition Result	Rank
Moez Echargui	Men's singles	Dan Evans (GBR); L 2–6, 6–4, 2–6	Did not advance					

== Weightlifting ==
Tunisia entered one weightlifter into the Olympic competition. Karem Ben Hnia (men's 73 kg) secured one available slots for continental quota allocation in his weight divisions based on the IWF Olympic Qualification Rankings.

Athlete	Event	Snatch		Clean & Jerk		Total	Rank
Athlete	Event	Result	Rank	Result	Rank	Total	Rank
Karem Ben Hnia	Men's −73 kg	149	8	181	8	330	8

== Wrestling ==
Tunisia qualified four wrestlers for Paris 2024. All of them qualified for the games following the triumph of advancing to the final round at 2024 African & Oceania Olympic Qualification Tournament in Alexandria, Egypt.

Key:

- VT (ranking points: 5–0 or 0–5) – Victory by fall.
- VB (ranking points: 5–0 or 0–5) – Victory by injury (VF for forfeit, VA for withdrawal or disqualification)
- PP (ranking points: 3–1 or 1–3) – Decision by points – the loser with technical points.
- PO (ranking points: 3–0 or 0–3) – Decision by points – the loser without technical points.
- ST (ranking points: 4–0 or 0–4) – Great superiority – the loser without technical points and a margin of victory of at least 8 (Greco-Roman) or 10 (freestyle) points.
- SP (ranking points: 4–1 or 1–4) – Technical superiority – the loser with technical points and a margin of victory of at least 8 (Greco-Roman) or 10 (freestyle) points.

Freestyle

Athlete	Event	Round of 16	Quarterfinal	Semifinal	Repechage	Final / BM	
Athlete	Event	Opposition Result	Opposition Result	Opposition Result	Opposition Result	Opposition Result	Rank
Siwar Bousetta	Women's −62 kg	Bullen (NOR); L 2–12	Did not advance				13
Zaineb Sghaier	Women's −76 kg	Rentería (COL); L 4–8 ^{PP}	Did not advance				10

Greco-Roman

Athlete	Event	Round of 16	Quarterfinals	Semifinals	Repechage	Final / BM	
Athlete	Event	Opposition Result	Opposition Result	Opposition Result	Opposition Result	Opposition Result	Rank
Souleymen Nasr	Men's −67 kg	Sylla (FRA); L 1–1 ^{PP}	Did not advance				11

== See also ==
- Tunisia at the 2024 Winter Youth Olympics
