= Taekwondo at the 2024 Summer Olympics – Men's 58 kg =

Men's 58 kg at the Games of the XXXIII Olympiad
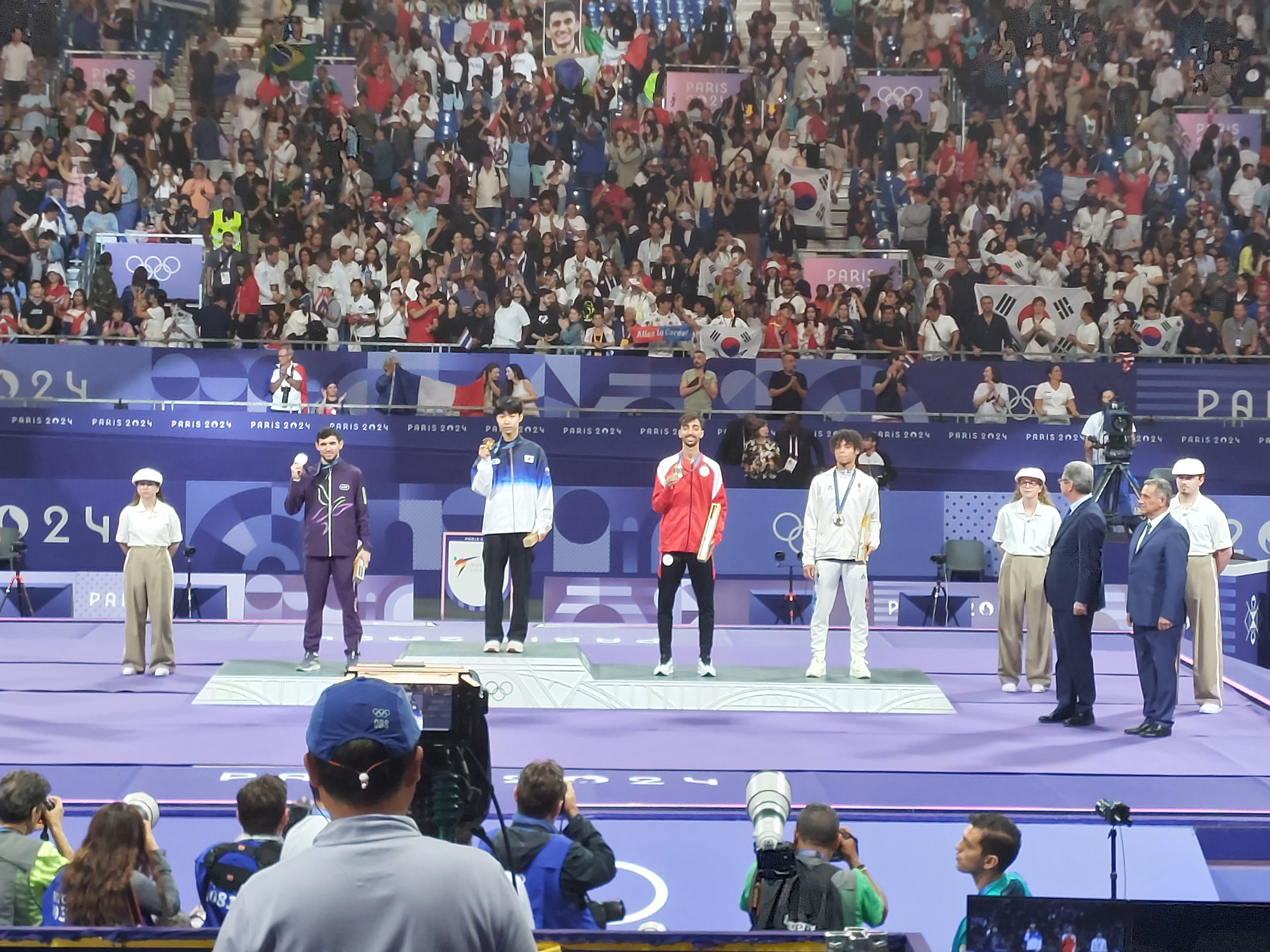
- From left to right; Magomedov, Park, Jendoubi, and Ravet on the podium.
- Venue: Grand Palais
- Date: 7 August 2024
- Competitors: 18 from 18 nations

Medalists
1st place, gold medalist(s)		Park Tae-joon	South Korea
2nd place, silver medalist(s)		Gashim Magomedov	Azerbaijan
3rd place, bronze medalist(s)		Cyrian Ravet	France
3rd place, bronze medalist(s)		Mohamed Khalil Jendoubi	Tunisia

The men's 58 kg competition in Taekwondo at the 2024 Summer Olympics was held on 7 August 2024 at the Grand Palais.

== Summary ==
This is the seventh appearance of the men's 58kg category, debut in 2000, and it has appeared in every games since then.

Vito Dell'Aquila was a defending Olympic champion, but he lost to Gashim Magomedov, later Dell'Aquila got into repechages, and lost to Cyrian Ravet in bronze medal matches, Tokyo 2020 silver medalist Mohamed Khalil Jendoubi won a bronze medal as well, by beating Adrián Vicente, after, Magomedov got into finals, and Park Tae-joon beat Magomedov to win a gold medal, became the first time since 2016, that Korea won gold in taekwondo, Mikhail Artamonov did not qualify because of the IOC did not declare them neutral and he was not invited to the Games.

== Schedule ==
All times are Central European Time (UTC+02:00)

Date	Time	Event
7 August 2024	09:00	Qualification Contest
7 August 2024	09:46	Round of 16
7 August 2024	14:40	Quarterfinals
7 August 2024	16:36	Semifinals
7 August 2024	19:40	Repechages
7 August 2024	20:34	Bronze medal match
7 August 2024	21:37	Final

== Seeds ==
Every practitioner was seeded at the event. Practitioners representing the hosting nation were seeded as no. 4 regardless of their current world ranking.

1. Mohamed Khalil Jendoubi (TUN) (bronze medalist)
2. Adrián Vicente (ESP) (loser of medal matches)
3. Vito Dell'Aquila (ITA) (loser of medal matches)
4. Cyrian Ravet (FRA) (bronze medalist)
5. Park Tae-joon (KOR) (Champion)
6. Omar Salim (HUN) (quarterfinals)
7. Jack Woolley (IRL) (loser of repechages)
8. Bailey Lewis (AUS) (quarterfinals)
9. Nouridine Issaka (NIG) (round of 16)
10. Gashim Magomedov (AZE) (Silver medalist)
11. Lucas Guzmán (ARG) (round of 16)
12. Yohandri Granado (VEN) (loser of repechages)
13. Georgii Gurtsiev (AIN) (round of 16)
14. Samirkhon Ababakirov (KAZ) (round of 16)
15. Omar Hantoli (PLE) (round of 16)
16. Bocar Diop (SEN) (qualification round)
17. Lev Korneev (SRB) (round of 16)
18. Hadi Tiranvalipour (EOR) (qualification round)

== Results ==
=== Gold medal match ===
Gold medal match
5	Park Tae-joon (KOR)	9	13
10	Gashim Magomedov (AZE)	0	1

=== Repechage ===
Repechage				Bronze Medal
				3	Vito Dell'Aquila (ITA)
				4	Cyrian Ravet (FRA)	w/o
4	Cyrian Ravet (FRA)	2	6	4	Cyrian Ravet (FRA)	w/o
12	Yohandri Granado (VEN)	1	2

Repechage				Bronze Medal
7	Jack Woolley (IRL)	9	2
2	Adrián Vicente (ESP)	10	2
2	Adrián Vicente (ESP)	10	2	2	Adrián Vicente (ESP)	3	1
				1	Mohamed Khalil Jendoubi (TUN)	11	12

=== Main bracket ===
==== Pool A ====
Qualification round
16	Bocar Diop (SEN)	3	0
17	Lev Korneev (SRB)	6	5

Round of 16
13	Georgii Gurtsiev (AIN)	6	3
4	Cyrian Ravet (FRA)	7	5
5	Park Tae-joon (KOR)	12	12
12	Yohandri Granado (VEN)	0	0
9	Nouridine Issaka (NIG)	2	4
8	Bailey Lewis (AUS)	5	6
1	Mohamed Khalil Jendoubi (TUN)	5	9
17	Lev Korneev (SRB)	3	3

Quarter-finals
4	Cyrian Ravet (FRA)	5	4	4
5	Park Tae-joon (KOR)	8	3	5
8	Bailey Lewis (AUS)	4	3
1	Mohamed Khalil Jendoubi (TUN)	7	6

Semi-finals
5	Park Tae-joon (KOR)	6	13
1	Mohamed Khalil Jendoubi (TUN)	2	6

==== Pool B ====
Qualification round
15	Omar Hantoli (PLE)	4	5
18	Hadi Tiranvalipour (EOR)	3	0

Round of 16
15	Omar Hantoli (PLE)	3	7
2	Adrián Vicente (ESP)	8	9
7	Jack Woolley (IRL)	4	7
10	Gashim Magomedov (AZE)	7	12
11	Lucas Guzmán (ARG)	0	5	0
6	Omar Salim (HUN)	6	3	3
3	Vito Dell'Aquila (ITA)	6	4	7
14	Samirkhon Ababakirov (KAZ)	12	3	4

Quarter-finals
2	Adrián Vicente (ESP)	5	11
10	Gashim Magomedov (AZE)	11	13
6	Omar Salim (HUN)	4	0
3	Vito Dell'Aquila (ITA)	9	13

Semi-finals
10	Gashim Magomedov (AZE)	9	11
3	Vito Dell'Aquila (ITA)	4	1
