= Taekwondo at the 2026 Asian Games – Men's 68 kg =

Taekwondo competition

Men's 68 kg at the 2026 Asian Games
- Venue: Toyohashi City General Gymnasium
- Date: 3 October 2026
- Competitors: 15 from 15 nations

Medalists
gold medal	Banlung Tubtimdang	Thailand
silver medal	Mehdi Haji Mousaei	Iran
bronze medal	Zaid Kareem	Jordan
bronze medal	Mun Jin-ho	South Korea

The men's 68 kilograms event at the 2026 Asian Games took place on 3 October 2026 at Toyohashi City General Gymnasium, Toyohashi, Japan.

Each bout consisted of up to three rounds, lasting two minutes apiece. The athlete who scored more points in each round was the winner of that round; the bout finished when one athlete had won two rounds (and thus the match).

Banlung Tubtimdang of Thailand won the gold medal.

== Schedule ==
All times are Japan Standard Time (UTC+09:00)

Date	Time	Event
Saturday, 3 October 2026	09:00	Round of 16
Saturday, 3 October 2026	09:00	Quarterfinals
Saturday, 3 October 2026	14:30	Semifinals
Saturday, 3 October 2026	14:30	Gold medal contest

== Results ==
Round of 16
Gantulgyn Enkhbayar (MGL)	15	21
Kaito Iwaki (JPN)	0	6
Zaid Kareem (JOR)	16	12
Hikmatullah Zain (AFG)	4	7
Chen Yufan (CHN)	9	17
Lo Wai Fung (HKG)	0	5
Kavka Zhafif Putrawitama (INA)	0	1
Najmiddin Kosimkhojiev (UZB)	17	16
Hsu Hao-yu (TPE)	2	7
Banlung Tubtimdang (THA)	6	7
Omar Hantoli (PLE)	2	4
Mun Jin-ho (KOR)	12	10
Samirkhon Ababakirov (KAZ)	6	18
Lê Tuấn (VIE)	6	2

Quarterfinals
Gantulgyn Enkhbayar (MGL)	9	0
Zaid Kareem (JOR)	16	15
Chen Yufan (CHN)	5	7	17
Mehdi Haji Mousaei (IRI)	13	5	24
' Najmiddin Kosimkhojiev (UZB)	5	9	4
Banlung Tubtimdang (THA)	9	4	4
Mun Jin-ho (KOR)	12	9
Samirkhon Ababakirov (KAZ)	9	6

Semifinals
Zaid Kareem (JOR)	5	6	5
Mehdi Haji Mousaei (IRI)	8	4	16
Banlung Tubtimdang (THA)	0	14	5
Mun Jin-ho (KOR)	9	0	5

Gold medal contest
Mehdi Haji Mousaei (IRI)	5	2
Banlung Tubtimdang (THA)	6	3
