= Samirkhon Ababakirov =

Kazakh taekwondo practitioner (born 2003)

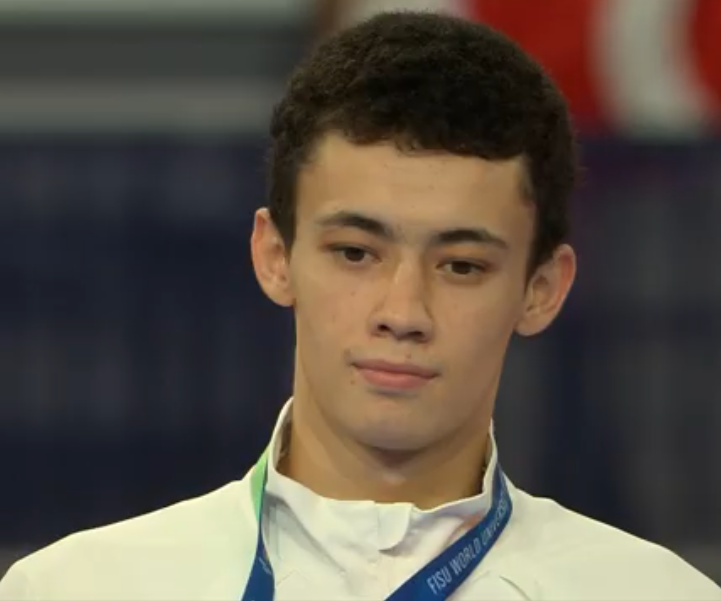
- Ababakirov at the 2025 Summer World University Games

Personal information
- Born: 26 September 2003 (age 23) Shymkent, Kazakhstan
Medal record
Men's taekwondo
Representing Kazakhstan
Asian Championships
Bronze medal – third place	2026 Ulaanbaatar	63 kg
World University Games
Gold medal – first place	2025 Rhine-Ruhr	63 kg
Bronze medal – third place	2025 Rhine-Ruhr	Mixed team

Samirkhon Sarvarkhonovich Ababakirov (born 26 September 2003) is a Kazakh taekwondo practitioner. He competed at the 2024 Olympic Games and was a gold medalist at the 2025 World University Games.

== Career ==
He competed at the 2022 World Taekwondo Championships in Mexico in the Men's flyweight, losing to Vito Dell'Aquila in the quarter-finals. He participated at the 2023 World Taekwondo Championships in Baku in the flyweight category.

He reached the semi-finals at the 2024 Asian Taekwondo Olympic Qualification Tournament in March 2024. He competed at the 2024 Paris Olympics in the 58kg division losing to Vito Dell'Aquila.

In April 2025, Ababakirov won a silver medal at the WT President's Cup Asian Region international tournament in Tai'an, China after facing Jang Jun of South Korea in the final. He won the gold medal in the -63kg category at the 2025 World University Games in Germany, defeating Türkiye's Ömer Faruk Dayıoğlu in the final and two-time Olympic medallist Mohamed Khalil Jendoubi of Tunisia in the semi-final. He also won a bronze medal in the mixed team event at the Games.

The top seed at the 2025 World Taekwondo Championships in the men's bantamweight division, he was defeated by eventual gold medalist, Jendoubi of Tunisia.
