= 2024 Asian Taekwondo Olympic Qualification Tournament =

Taekwondo competition

The 2024 Asian Qualification Tournament for Paris Olympic Games was held at Taishan International Convention and Exhibition Center, Tai'an, China on 15 and 16 March 2024. Each country could enter a maximum of 2 male and 2 female divisions with only one athlete in each division. The two finalists of each division qualified for the Olympic Games under their National Olympic Committee.

== Men ==
=== −58 kg ===
16 March

Round of 32
Rahul Kumal (NEP)	0–2 (0–4, 4–11)	Mohammed Nadhim (IRQ)
Nurkhan Samidinov (KGZ)	2–0 (9–6, 9–3)	Nguyễn Hồng Trọng (VIE)

Round of 16
Riad Hamdi (KSA)	0	5
Mohammed Nadhim (IRQ)	0	3
Mahdi Khavari (EOR)	4	12	10
Sebastian Tan (MAS)	5	3	6
Omar Hantoli (PLE)	6	10
Sultan Al-Ali (UAE)	3	1
Hidetaka Maeda (JPN)	1	6
Mohsen Rezaee (AFG)	13	12
Kurt Bryan Barbosa (PHI)	16	12
Chalinda Liyanage (SRI)	3	0
Chiok Chun Yin (HKG)	DQ
~~Haroon Khan (PAK)~~
Thanakrit Yodrak (THA)	10	13^{P}
Dashdavaagiin Chinzorig (MGL)	9	4
Nurkhan Samidinov (KGZ)	4	8	1
Samirkhon Ababakirov (KAZ)	9	7	3

Quarterfinals
Riad Hamdi (KSA)	7	1	2
Mahdi Khavari (EOR)	6	3	1
Omar Hantoli (PLE)	3	5
Mohsen Rezaee (AFG)	0	4
Kurt Bryan Barbosa (PHI)	11	6	8
Chiok Chun Yin (HKG)	1	10	4
Thanakrit Yodrak (THA)	6	6
Samirkhon Ababakirov (KAZ)	12	19

Semifinals
Riad Hamdi (KSA)	3	5	1
Omar Hantoli (PLE)	2	7	4
Kurt Bryan Barbosa (PHI)	4	5
Samirkhon Ababakirov (KAZ)	7	16

3rd place
Riad Hamdi (KSA)	5	3
Kurt Bryan Barbosa (PHI)	6	5

=== −68 kg ===
15 March

Round of 32
Abdulla Ghloum (UAE)	0–2 (0–6, 7–14)	Aman Kumar Kadyan (IND)

Round of 16
Banlung Tubtimdang (THA)	7	10
Aman Kumar Kadyan (IND)	0	1
Yehya Al-Ghotani (EOR)	6	2	6
Lý Hồng Phúc (VIE)	5	4	12
Ralph Hneineh (LBN)	4	6
Kaito Iwaki (JPN)	13	10
Adam Yazid Ferdyansyah (INA)	6	8
Ahmad Bahlool (PLE)	11	12
Arven Alcantara (PHI)	9	10
Nouraldin Jaidani (SYR)	2	2
Ali Reza Abbasi (EOR)	5	8	13
Bir Bahadur Mahara (NEP)	5	3	3
Tsagaantsoojiin Bayanbat (MGL)	1	3
Lo Wai Fung (HKG)	13	15
Mahmadjon Sunatov (TJK)	0	13	0
Chiu Yi-jui (TPE)	5	7	9

Quarterfinals
Banlung Tubtimdang (THA)	4	9
Lý Hồng Phúc (VIE)	1	1
Kaito Iwaki (JPN)	8	11
Ahmad Bahlool (PLE)	9	19
Arven Alcantara (PHI)	18	3	4
Ali Reza Abbasi (EOR)	11	4	4
Lo Wai Fung (HKG)	12	8	7
Chiu Yi-jui (TPE)	5	15	3

Semifinals
Banlung Tubtimdang (THA)	8	9
Ahmad Bahlool (PLE)	5	5
Ali Reza Abbasi (EOR)	10	10^{R}
Lo Wai Fung (HKG)	14	13

3rd place
Ahmad Bahlool (PLE)	13	4
Lo Wai Fung (HKG)	18	8

- Ali Reza Abbasi from the refugee team originally won the quota but was later ruled ineligible as a refugee athlete. His spot has been replaced by the third placed athlete.

=== −80 kg ===
15 March

Round of 16
Va Mithona (CAM)	6	12
Wael Al-Farraj (EOR)	0	0

Quarterfinals
Jasurbek Jaysunov (UZB)	13	13
Va Mithona (CAM)	0	0
Saif Taher (IRQ)	6	9
Syafiq Zuber (MAS)	5	1
Batyrkhan Toleugali (KAZ)	9	7
Akshay Hooda (IND)	2	1
Ossanando Naufal Khairudin (INA)	1	2
Ali Al-Mabrouk (KSA)	13	10

Semifinals
Jasurbek Jaysunov (UZB)	17^{P}	2
Saif Taher (IRQ)	2	1
Batyrkhan Toleugali (KAZ)	3	1
Ali Al-Mabrouk (KSA)	2	1

3rd place
Saif Taher (IRQ)	3	8
Ali Al-Mabrouk (KSA)	2	2

=== +80 kg ===
16 March

Quarterfinals
Song Zhaoxiang (CHN)	2	6
Akbar Aitakhunov (KGZ)	1	1
Ali Akbar Amiri (AFG)	7	5	3
Lee Meng-en (TPE)	6	6	4
Hamzah Omar Saeed (PAK)	2	2
Ray Rahi (LBN)	4	8
Wadhah Al-Ahmed (QAT)	0	0
Arian Salimi (IRI)	13	5

Semifinals
Song Zhaoxiang (CHN)	11	9
Lee Meng-en (TPE)	4	6
Ray Rahi (LBN)	0	3
Arian Salimi (IRI)	5	11^{P}

3rd place
Lee Meng-en (TPE)	3	0
Ray Rahi (LBN)	4	7

== Women ==
=== −49 kg ===
15 March

Round of 16
Anjali Tamang (NEP)	2	1
Ana Belo (TLS)	11	11
Ruka Okamoto (JPN)	7	14
Bat-Erdeniin Uchral (MGL)	0	7
Kry Lyden (CAM)	0	8
Su Po-ya (TPE)	12	11
Trương Thị Kim Tuyền (VIE)	2	6	4
Tachiana Mangin (PHI)	11	1	4
Aisha Ahmed (UAE)	0	1
Ni Kadek Heni Prikasih (INA)	2	8
Lam Siu Wai (HKG)	11	8
Maiar Qabaha (PLE)	3	0

Quarterfinals
Mobina Nematzadeh (IRI)	5^{P}	5^{P}
Ana Belo (TLS)	0	0
Ruka Okamoto (JPN)	1	7	9
Su Po-ya (TPE)	9	2	1
Tachiana Mangin (PHI)	4	0	0
Ni Kadek Heni Prikasih (INA)	1	4	0
Lam Siu Wai (HKG)	0	1
Dunya Abutaleb (KSA)	10	9

Semifinals
Mobina Nematzadeh (IRI)	8	11
Ruka Okamoto (JPN)	0	4
Tachiana Mangin (PHI)	3	0
Dunya Abutaleb (KSA)	3	1

3rd place
Ruka Okamoto (JPN)	4	3
Tachiana Mangin (PHI)	0	1

=== −57 kg ===
16 March

Round of 16
Shams Ahmad (SYR)	3	4
Law Sin Yi (HKG)	0	3
Yuzuho Kato (JPN)	11	11
Sania Khan (IND)	0	0

Quarterfinals
Laetitia Aoun (LBN)	13	14
Shams Ahmad (SYR)	1	1
Megawati Maheswari (INA)	3	7
Jessica Canabal (PHI)	9	11
Mariya Sevostyanova (KAZ)	6	2
Julie Mam (CAM)	8	3
Yuzuho Kato (JPN)	2	0
Kim Yu-jin (KOR)	3	3

Semifinals
Laetitia Aoun (LBN)	11	6
Jessica Canabal (PHI)	0	5
Julie Mam (CAM)	5	1
Kim Yu-jin (KOR)	15	12

3rd place
Jessica Canabal (PHI)	3	3	3
Julie Mam (CAM)	1	4	1

=== −67 kg ===
15 March

Quarterfinals				Semifinals				3rd place
				Sasikarn Tongchan (THA)	10	0
Indira Basnet (NEP)	4	0	3	Indira Basnet (NEP)	0	0
Maram Fatnassi (QAT)	0	0	2					Indira Basnet (NEP)	0	0
Bạc Thị Khiêm (VIE)	3	2						Bạc Thị Khiêm (VIE)	5	2
Mokhru Khalimova (TJK)	0	0		Bạc Thị Khiêm (VIE)	5	3	1
				Ozoda Sobirjonova (UZB)	0	12	6

=== +67 kg ===
16 March

Quarterfinals
Cansel Deniz (KAZ)	6	4
Ganzorigiin Enkhchimeg (MGL)	2	1
Salma Al-Ketbi (UAE)	1	3
Munira Abdusalomova (TJK)	8	15
Ward Selman (LBN)	8	7
Noor Nazar Mohammed (QAT)	3	0
Margerette Maria Regi (IND)	4	2
Rama Abu Al-Rub (JOR)	11	7

Semifinals
Cansel Deniz (KAZ)	2	1	5
Munira Abdusalomova (TJK)	0	4	10
Ward Selman (LBN)	3	2
Rama Abu Al-Rub (JOR)	3	3

3rd place
Cansel Deniz (KAZ)
Ward Selman (LBN)	WD
