= Mehdi Haji Mousaei =

Iranian Taekwondo practitioner (born 2004)

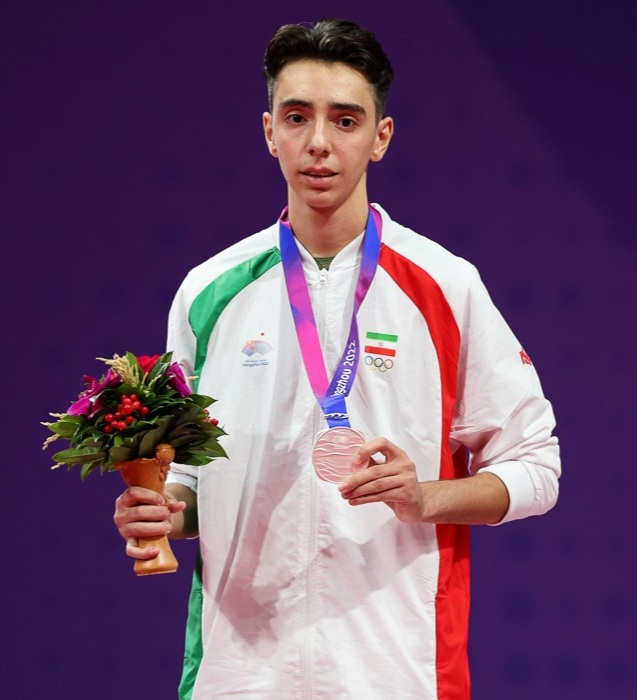

Personal information
- Native name: مهدی حاجی‌موسایی
- Nationality: Iranian
- Born: 29 June 2004 (age 22)

Sport
- Sport: Taekwondo
- Weight class: 63 kg
Medal record
Men's taekwondo
Representing Iran
World Championships
Silver medal – second place	2025 Wuxi	63 kg
Asian Championships
Gold medal – first place	2024 Da Nang	58 kg
Gold medal – first place	2026 Ulaanbaatar	63 kg
Silver medal – second place	2022 Chuncheon	58 kg
Asian Games
Silver medal – second place	2022 Hangzhou	58 kg
Silver medal – second place	2026 Aichi-Nagoya	68 kg
World University Games
Gold medal – first place	2021 Chengdu	54 kg

Mehdi Haji Mousaei (Persian:مهدی حاجی‌موسایی, born 29 June 2004) is an Iranian taekwondo practitioner. He won a silver medal at the 2025 World Taekwondo Championships.

== Career ==
In June 2022, Mousaei competed at the 2022 Asian Taekwondo Championships and won a silver medal in the 58 kg event, losing to Bae Jun-seo in the finals. He competed at the 2021 Summer World University Games, which was delayed until August 2023, and won a gold medal in the 54 kg event. He competed at the 2022 Asian Games, which was delayed until September 2023, and won a silver medal in the 58 kg event.

In May 2024, he competed at the 2024 Asian Taekwondo Championships and won a gold medal in the 58 kg event. In October 2025, he competed at the 2025 World Taekwondo Championships and won a silver medal in the 63 kg event.
