= Taekwondo at the 2020 Summer Olympics – Men's 58 kg =

Taekwondo competition

Men's 58 kg at the Games of the XXXII Olympiad
- Venue: Makuhari Messe
- Date: 24 July 2021
- Competitors: 16 from 16 nations

Medalists
1st place, gold medalist(s)		Vito Dell'Aquila	Italy
2nd place, silver medalist(s)		Mohamed Khalil Jendoubi	Tunisia
3rd place, bronze medalist(s)		Mikhail Artamonov	ROC
3rd place, bronze medalist(s)		Jang Jun	South Korea

The men's 58 kg competition in Taekwondo at the 2020 Summer Olympics was held on 24 July 2021 at the Makuhari Messe Hall A.

== Results ==
=== Main bracket ===
Preliminary round
13	Solomon Demse (ETH)	22
4	Sergio Suzuki (JPN)	2
5	Mikhail Artamonov (ROC)	18
12	Mohamed Khalil Jendoubi (TUN)	25
9	Rui Bragança (POR)	9
8	Adrián Vicente (ESP)	24
1	Jang Jun (KOR)	26
16	Kurt Bryan Barbosa (PHI)	6
15	Omar Salim (HUN)	13
2	Vito Dell'Aquila (ITA)	26
7	Safwan Khalil (AUS)	7
10	Ramnarong Sawekwiharee (THA)	23
11	Lucas Guzmán (ARG)	22
6	Jack Woolley (IRL)	19
3	Armin Hadipour (IRI)	22
14	Jefferson Ochoa (COL)	19

Quarterfinals
13	Solomon Demse (ETH)	9
12	Mohamed Khalil Jendoubi (TUN)	32
8	Adrián Vicente (ESP)	19
1	Jang Jun (KOR)	24
2	Vito Dell'Aquila (ITA)	37
10	Ramnarong Sawekwiharee (THA)	17
11	Lucas Guzmán (ARG)	26
3	Armin Hadipour (IRI)	6

Semifinals
12	Mohamed Khalil Jendoubi (TUN)	25
1	Jang Jun (KOR)	19
2	Vito Dell'Aquila (ITA)	29
11	Lucas Guzmán (ARG)	10

Gold medal match
12	Mohamed Khalil Jendoubi (TUN)	12
2	Vito Dell'Aquila (ITA)	16

=== Repechage ===
Repechage			Bronze Medal
			1	Jang Jun (KOR)	46
			15	Omar Salim (HUN)	16
15	Omar Salim (HUN)	43	15	Omar Salim (HUN)	16
10	Ramnarong Sawekwiharee (THA)	22

Repechage			Bronze Medal
			11	Lucas Guzmán (ARG)	10
			5	Mikhail Artamonov (ROC)	15
5	Mikhail Artamonov (ROC)	27	5	Mikhail Artamonov (ROC)	15
13	Solomon Demse (ETH)	5
