= 2024 European Taekwondo Championships – Men's 58 kg =

Men's 58 kg at the 2024 European Taekwondo Championships
- Venue: Belgrade Fair – Hall 1
- Location: Belgrade, Serbia
- Dates: 10 May
- Competitors: 27 from 27 nations

Medalists
gold medal	Vito Dell'Aquila	Italy
silver medal	Lev Korneev	Serbia
bronze medal	Gashim Magomedov	Azerbaijan
bronze medal	Adrián Vicente	Spain

The men's 58 kg competition at the 2024 European Taekwondo Championships was held on 10 May 2024.

== Results ==
=== Finals ===
Semifinals
Adrián Vicente (ESP)	0
Lev Korneev (SRB)	2
Gashim Magomedov (AZE)	0
Vito Dell'Aquila (ITA)	2

Final
Lev Korneev (SRB)	1
Vito Dell'Aquila (ITA)	2

=== Top half ===
==== Section 1 ====
Round of 32
Ernest Merdanaj (ALB)	2
Niklas Kristiansen Oguz (NOR)	0
Serghei Uscov (MDA)	2
Tiago Lopes (POR)	0
Garegin Makhmuryan (ARM)	0
Ömer Faruk Dayıoğlu (TUR)	2

Round of 16
Adrián Vicente (ESP)	2
Ernest Merdanaj (ALB)	1
Serghei Uscov (MDA)	0
Ömer Faruk Dayıoğlu (TUR)	2

Quarterfinals
Adrián Vicente (ESP)	2
Ömer Faruk Dayıoğlu (TUR)	1

==== Section 2 ====
Round of 32
Idar Bagov (AIN)	2
Jan Flegar (CRO)	0
Ricki Farnes (DEN)	1
Vladyslav Funkendorf (UKR)	2

Round of 16
Dionisis Rapsomanikis (GRE)	2
Idar Bagov (AIN)	1
Vladyslav Funkendorf (UKR)	0
Lev Korneev (SRB)	2

Quarterfinals
Dionisis Rapsomanikis (GRE)	0
Lev Korneev (SRB)	2

=== Bottom half ===
==== Section 3 ====
Round of 32
Bartosz Strugliński (POL)	0
Otto Susiluoto (FIN)	2
Khaled Abdel Halim (GER)	2
Hamza Bahtanović (BIH)	0
Tristan Scutaru (ROU)	0
Gashim Magomedov (AZE)	2

Round of 16
Jack Woolley (IRL)	2
Otto Susiluoto (FIN)	0
Khaled Abdel Halim (GER)	1
Gashim Magomedov (AZE)	2

Quarterfinals
Jack Woolley (IRL)	0
Gashim Magomedov (AZE)	2

==== Section 4 ====
Round of 32
Sharif Gergely Salim (HUN)	2
Charalampos Palourtis (CYP)	0
Vitali Geladze (GEO)	1
Aymen Achnine (NED)	2
Nikolaj Bulatović (SLO)	1
Ori Patishi (ISR)	2

Round of 16
Sharif Gergely Salim (HUN)	2
Aymen Achnine (NED)	0
Ori Patishi (ISR)	0
Vito Dell'Aquila (ITA)	2

Quarterfinals
Sharif Gergely Salim (HUN)	0
Vito Dell'Aquila (ITA)	2
