= Taekwondo at the 2022 Asian Games – Men's 58 kg =

Men's 58 kg at the 2022 Asian Games
- Venue: Lin'an Sports and Culture Centre
- Date: 25 September 2023
- Competitors: 30 from 30 nations

Medalists
gold medal	Jang Jun	South Korea
silver medal	Mehdi Haji Mousaei	Iran
bronze medal	Mohsen Rezaee	Afghanistan
bronze medal	Cheng Kai	China

The men's 58 kilograms event at the 2022 Asian Games took place on 24 September 2023 at Lin'an Sports and Culture Centre, Hangzhou, China.

== Schedule ==
All times are China Standard Time (UTC+08:00)

Date	Time	Event
Monday, 25 September 2023	09:00	Round of 32
Monday, 25 September 2023	09:00	Round of 16
Monday, 25 September 2023	14:00	Quarterfinals
Monday, 25 September 2023	14:00	Semifinals
Monday, 25 September 2023	14:00	Gold medal contest

== Results ==
Legend

- DQ — Won by disqualification
- P — Won by punitive declaration
- W — Won by withdrawal

=== Final ===
Gold medal contest
Jang Jun (KOR)	5	4
Mehdi Haji Mousaei (IRI)	4	4

=== Top half ===
Round of 32
Chalinda Liyanage (SRI)	14	15
Sam Youdeth (CAM)	1	8
Huang Yu-xiang (TPE)	W
Sagar Rai (BHU)
Rahul Kumal (NEP)	4	1
Riad Hamdi (KSA)	12	5
Raphael Koudsi (LBN)	D	Q
Yaaqob Saeed (QAT)
Cerilio Lein (TLS)	9	4
Yeldos Yskak (KAZ)	16	17
Seiya Higashijima (JPN)	15	17
Muath Ebrahim Mohammed (BRN)	1	4
Nurullo Murodov (TJK)	0	0
Mohsen Rezaee (AFG)	6	12

Round of 16
Jang Jun (KOR)	3	6
Chalinda Liyanage (SRI)	1	1
Huang Yu-xiang (TPE)	5	4
Riad Hamdi (KSA)	1	1
Raphael Koudsi (LBN)	1	2
Yeldos Yskak (KAZ)	5	14
Seiya Higashijima (JPN)	4	11
Mohsen Rezaee (AFG)	11	13

Quarterfinals
Jang Jun (KOR)	4	14
Huang Yu-xiang (TPE)	1	2
Yeldos Yskak (KAZ)	0	7
Mohsen Rezaee (AFG)	13	9

Semifinals
Jang Jun (KOR)	7	14^{P}
Mohsen Rezaee (AFG)	5	12

=== Bottom half ===
Round of 32
Thanakrit Yodrak (THA)	13	13
Kou Hin Kit (MAC)	0	0
Ali Al-Mershad (KUW)	1	0
Cheng Kai (CHN)	12	12
Chiok Chun Yin (HKG)	10	5
Abdulla Al-Maazmi (UAE)	15	12
Kitsada Khenthonglath (LAO)	0	1
Omar Hantoli (PLE)	12	15
Mehdi Haji Mousaei (IRI)	14	14
Mohamed Eleas (BAN)	0	0
Omonjon Otajonov (UZB)	5	14
Kurt Bryan Barbosa (PHI)	4	13
Sainbilegiin Gan-Erdene (MGL)	5	6
Aidin Altybaev (KGZ)	11	13

Round of 16
Thanakrit Yodrak (THA)	0	6
Cheng Kai (CHN)	13	15
Abdalla Al-Maazmi (UAE)	7	14
Omar Hantoli (PLE)	10	15
Mehdi Haji Mousaei (IRI)	8	7
Omonjon Otajonov (UZB)	7	6
Aidin Altybaev (KGZ)	5	10	15
Haroon Khan (PAK)	10	9	12

Quarterfinals
Cheng Kai (CHN)	13	9
Omar Hantoli (PLE)	8	0
Mehdi Haji Mousaei (IRI)	11	16
Aidin Altybaev (KGZ)	0	8

Semifinals
Cheng Kai (CHN)	19	5	2
Mehdi Haji Mousaei (IRI)	16	19	17
