= 2022 Asian Taekwondo Championships =

Taekwondo competition

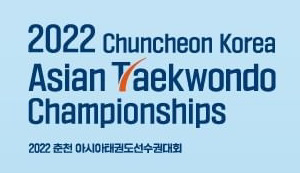
- Venue: Hoban Gymnasium
- Location: Chuncheon, South Korea
- Dates: 24–27 June 2022

Champions
- Men: Uzbekistan
- Women: Iran

The 2022 Asian Taekwondo Championships were the 25th edition of the Asian Taekwondo Championships, and were held from 24 to 27 June 2022 in Hoban Gymnasium, Chuncheon, South Korea.

== Medal summary ==
=== Men ===
Event	Gold	Silver	Bronze
Finweight −54 kg	Park Tae-joon; South Korea	Loay Ihmedan; Jordan	Fahad Al-Samih; Saudi Arabia
Finweight −54 kg	Park Tae-joon; South Korea	Loay Ihmedan; Jordan	Shahzaib Khan; Pakistan
Flyweight −58 kg	Bae Jun-seo; South Korea	Mehdi Haji Mousaei; Iran	Mohsen Rezaee; Afghanistan
Flyweight −58 kg	Bae Jun-seo; South Korea	Mehdi Haji Mousaei; Iran	Zhassurbek Israilov; Kazakhstan
Bantamweight −63 kg	Kim Tae-yong; South Korea	Liang Yushuai; China	Zaid Al-Halawani; Jordan
Bantamweight −63 kg	Kim Tae-yong; South Korea	Liang Yushuai; China	Adilet Bazarbayev; Kazakhstan
Featherweight −68 kg	Ulugbek Rashitov; Uzbekistan	Zaid Kareem; Jordan	Danial Bozorgi; Iran
Featherweight −68 kg	Ulugbek Rashitov; Uzbekistan	Zaid Kareem; Jordan	Xiao Chenming; China
Lightweight −74 kg	Jasurbek Jaysunov; Uzbekistan	Mirhashem Hosseini; Iran	Lakchai Hauihongthong; Thailand
Lightweight −74 kg	Jasurbek Jaysunov; Uzbekistan	Mirhashem Hosseini; Iran	Ahmad Bahlool; Palestine
Welterweight −80 kg	Shukhrat Salaev; Uzbekistan	Saleh El-Sharabaty; Jordan	Seo Geon-woo; South Korea
Welterweight −80 kg	Shukhrat Salaev; Uzbekistan	Saleh El-Sharabaty; Jordan	Nurlan Myrzabayev; Kazakhstan
Middleweight −87 kg	Nikita Rafalovich; Uzbekistan	Fahed Ammar Sbeihi; Jordan	Smaiyl Duisebay; Kazakhstan
Middleweight −87 kg	Nikita Rafalovich; Uzbekistan	Fahed Ammar Sbeihi; Jordan	Lee Meng-en; Chinese Taipei
Heavyweight +87 kg	Song Zhaoxiang; China	Alireza Nadalian; Iran	Kang Yeon-ho; South Korea
Heavyweight +87 kg	Song Zhaoxiang; China	Alireza Nadalian; Iran	Ali Akbar Amiri; Afghanistan

=== Women ===
Event	Gold	Silver	Bronze
Finweight −46 kg	Kang Mi-reu; South Korea	Julanan Khantikulanon; Thailand	Karen Oshima; Japan
Finweight −46 kg	Kang Mi-reu; South Korea	Julanan Khantikulanon; Thailand	Rita Bakisheva; Kazakhstan
Flyweight −49 kg	Guo Qing; China	Mobina Nematzadeh; Iran	Botakoz Kapanova; Kazakhstan
Flyweight −49 kg	Guo Qing; China	Mobina Nematzadeh; Iran	Kang Bo-ra; South Korea
Bantamweight −53 kg	Nahid Kiani; Iran	Charos Kayumova; Uzbekistan	Dunya Abutaleb; Saudi Arabia
Bantamweight −53 kg	Nahid Kiani; Iran	Charos Kayumova; Uzbekistan	Wang Xiaolu; China
Featherweight −57 kg	Luo Zongshi; China	Lee Ah-reum; South Korea	Phannapa Harnsujin; Thailand
Featherweight −57 kg	Luo Zongshi; China	Lee Ah-reum; South Korea	Zahra Sheidaei; Iran
Lightweight −62 kg	Nam Min-seo; South Korea	Nastaran Valizadeh; Iran	Feruza Sadikova; Uzbekistan
Lightweight −62 kg	Nam Min-seo; South Korea	Nastaran Valizadeh; Iran	Sasikarn Tongchan; Thailand
Welterweight −67 kg	Julyana Al-Sadeq; Jordan	Liu Junhong; China	Mokhru Khalimova; Tajikistan
Welterweight −67 kg	Julyana Al-Sadeq; Jordan	Liu Junhong; China	Nuray Khussainova; Kazakhstan
Middleweight −73 kg	Zahra Pouresmaeil; Iran	Cansel Deniz; Kazakhstan	Ward Selman; Lebanon
Middleweight −73 kg	Zahra Pouresmaeil; Iran	Cansel Deniz; Kazakhstan	Myeong Mi-na; South Korea
Heavyweight +73 kg	Akram Khodabandeh; Iran	Zhou Zeqi; China	Svetlana Osipova; Uzbekistan
Heavyweight +73 kg	Akram Khodabandeh; Iran	Zhou Zeqi; China	Alissar Elias; Syria

== Medal table ==
Rank	Nation	Gold	Silver	Bronze	Total
1	South Korea	5	1	4	10
2	Uzbekistan	4	1	2	7
3	Iran	3	5	2	10
4	China	3	3	2	8
5	Jordan	1	4	1	6
6	Kazakhstan	0	1	7	8
7	Thailand	0	1	3	4
8	Afghanistan	0	0	2	2
8	Saudi Arabia	0	0	2	2
10	Chinese Taipei	0	0	1	1
10	Japan	0	0	1	1
10	Lebanon	0	0	1	1
10	Pakistan	0	0	1	1
10	Palestine	0	0	1	1
10	Syria	0	0	1	1
10	Tajikistan	0	0	1	1
Totals (16 entries)		16	16	32	64

== Team ranking ==
=== Men ===
Rank	Team	Points
1	Uzbekistan	501
2	South Korea	421
3	Jordan	239
4	China	207
5	Iran	187

=== Women ===
Rank	Team	Points
1	Iran	500
2	China	379
3	South Korea	347
4	Jordan	127
5	Kazakhstan	121
