= Mahmoud Al-Taryreh =

Jordanian taekwondo practitioner (born 2004)

Personal information
- Native name: محمود الطيرة
- Nationality: Jordanian
- Born: 16 February 2004 (age 22)

Sport
- Sport: Taekwondo
- Weight class: 63 kg
Medal record
Men's taekwondo
Representing Jordan
World Championships
Bronze medal – third place	2023 Baku	58 kg
Bronze medal – third place	2025 Wuxi	63 kg

Mahmoud Al-Taryreh (Arabic: محمود الطيرة; born 16 February 2004) is a Jordanian taekwondo practitioner. He is a two-time World Taekwondo Championships bronze medalist.

== Career ==
Al-Taryreh competed at the 2023 World Taekwondo Championships and won a bronze medal in the 58 kg category. He competed at the 2025 World Taekwondo Championships and won a bronze medal in the 63 kg category.
