= 2024 Asian Taekwondo Championships =

Taekwondo competition

- Venue: Tiên Sơn Sports Palace
- Location: Da Nang, Vietnam
- Dates: 16–18 May 2024

Champions
- Men: Iran
- Women: South Korea

The 2024 Asian Taekwondo Championships were the 26th edition of the Asian Taekwondo Championships, and were held from 16 to 18 May 2024 in Tiên Sơn Sports Palace, Da Nang, Vietnam.

== Medal summary ==
=== Men ===
Event	Gold	Silver	Bronze
Finweight −54 kg	Riad Hamdi; Saudi Arabia	Shahzaib Khan; Pakistan	Jakhongir Khudayberdiev; Uzbekistan
Finweight −54 kg	Riad Hamdi; Saudi Arabia	Shahzaib Khan; Pakistan	Yang Hui-chan; South Korea
Flyweight −58 kg	Mehdi Haji Mousaei; Iran	Park Tae-joon; South Korea	Bae Jun-seo; South Korea
Flyweight −58 kg	Mehdi Haji Mousaei; Iran	Park Tae-joon; South Korea	Abolfazl Zandi; Iran
Bantamweight −63 kg	Jang Jun; South Korea	Napat Sritimongkol; Thailand	Zhang Hao; China
Bantamweight −63 kg	Jang Jun; South Korea	Napat Sritimongkol; Thailand	Matin Rezaei; Iran
Featherweight −68 kg	Jin Ho-jun; South Korea	Banlung Tubtimdang; Thailand	Chiu Yi-jui; Chinese Taipei
Featherweight −68 kg	Jin Ho-jun; South Korea	Banlung Tubtimdang; Thailand	Diyorbek Tukhliboev; Uzbekistan
Lightweight −74 kg	Lee Sang-ryeol; South Korea	Kim Tae-wook; South Korea	Cai Zhaoxun; China
Lightweight −74 kg	Lee Sang-ryeol; South Korea	Kim Tae-wook; South Korea	Najmiddin Kosimkhojiev; Uzbekistan
Welterweight −80 kg	Jasurbek Jaysunov; Uzbekistan	Ali Khoshravesh; Iran	Seo Geon-woo; South Korea
Welterweight −80 kg	Jasurbek Jaysunov; Uzbekistan	Ali Khoshravesh; Iran	Saleh El-Sharabaty; Jordan
Middleweight −87 kg	Mohammad Hossein Yazdani; Iran	Mehran Barkhordari; Iran	Fahed Ammar Sbeihi; Jordan
Middleweight −87 kg	Mohammad Hossein Yazdani; Iran	Mehran Barkhordari; Iran	Meng Mingkuan; China
Heavyweight +87 kg	Arian Salimi; Iran	Park Woo-hyeok; South Korea	Lee Meng-en; Chinese Taipei
Heavyweight +87 kg	Arian Salimi; Iran	Park Woo-hyeok; South Korea	Wang Yaoxi; China

=== Women ===
Event	Gold	Silver	Bronze
Finweight −46 kg	Wang Shiyi; China	Kamonchanok Seeken; Thailand	Kang Mi-reu; South Korea
Finweight −46 kg	Wang Shiyi; China	Kamonchanok Seeken; Thailand	Saeideh Nassiri; Iran
Flyweight −49 kg	Wang Xiaolu; China	Panipak Wongpattanakit; Thailand	Trương Thị Kim Tuyền; Vietnam
Flyweight −49 kg	Wang Xiaolu; China	Panipak Wongpattanakit; Thailand	Kang Bo-ra; South Korea
Bantamweight −53 kg	Dunya Abutaleb; Saudi Arabia	Chutikan Jongkolrattanawattana; Thailand	Park Hye-jin; South Korea
Bantamweight −53 kg	Dunya Abutaleb; Saudi Arabia	Chutikan Jongkolrattanawattana; Thailand	Su Po-ya; Chinese Taipei
Featherweight −57 kg	Kim Yu-jin; South Korea	Mariya Sevostyanova; Kazakhstan	Lin Wei-chun; Chinese Taipei
Featherweight −57 kg	Kim Yu-jin; South Korea	Mariya Sevostyanova; Kazakhstan	Laetitia Aoun; Lebanon
Lightweight −62 kg	Sasikarn Tongchan; Thailand	Feruza Sadikova; Uzbekistan	Phạm Ngọc Châm; Vietnam
Lightweight −62 kg	Sasikarn Tongchan; Thailand	Feruza Sadikova; Uzbekistan	Chang Jui-en; Chinese Taipei
Welterweight −67 kg	Bạc Thị Khiêm; Vietnam	Song Jie; China	Kwak Min-ju; South Korea
Welterweight −67 kg	Bạc Thị Khiêm; Vietnam	Song Jie; China	Chiu Shao-hsuan; Chinese Taipei
Middleweight −73 kg	Myeong Mi-na; South Korea	Melika Mirhosseini; Iran	Gulsanam Alijonova; Uzbekistan
Middleweight −73 kg	Myeong Mi-na; South Korea	Melika Mirhosseini; Iran	Xiao Shunan; China
Heavyweight +73 kg	Xu Lei; China	Song Da-bin; South Korea	Rodali Barua; India
Heavyweight +73 kg	Xu Lei; China	Song Da-bin; South Korea	Svetlana Osipova; Uzbekistan

== Medal table ==
Rank	Nation	Gold	Silver	Bronze	Total
1	South Korea	5	4	7	16
2	Iran	3	3	3	9
3	China	3	1	5	9
4	Saudi Arabia	2	0	0	2
5	Thailand	1	5	0	6
6	Uzbekistan	1	1	5	7
7	Vietnam	1	0	2	3
8	Kazakhstan	0	1	0	1
8	Pakistan	0	1	0	1
10	Chinese Taipei	0	0	6	6
11	Jordan	0	0	2	2
12	India	0	0	1	1
12	Lebanon	0	0	1	1
Totals (13 entries)		16	16	32	64

== Team ranking ==
=== Men ===
Rank	Team	Points
1	Iran	453
2	South Korea	404
3	Uzbekistan	194
4	Thailand	109
5	China	71
6	Pakistan	56
7	Jordan	46
8	Chinese Taipei	9
9	Saudi Arabia	6
10	Vietnam	5

=== Women ===
Rank	Team	Points
1	South Korea	371
2	China	325
3	Thailand	286
4	Vietnam	172
5	Saudi Arabia	128
6	Iran	76
7	Chinese Taipei	74
8	Kazakhstan	53
9	Uzbekistan	44
10	Lebanon	23
