= Kurt Bryan Barbosa =

Filipino taekwondo practitioner

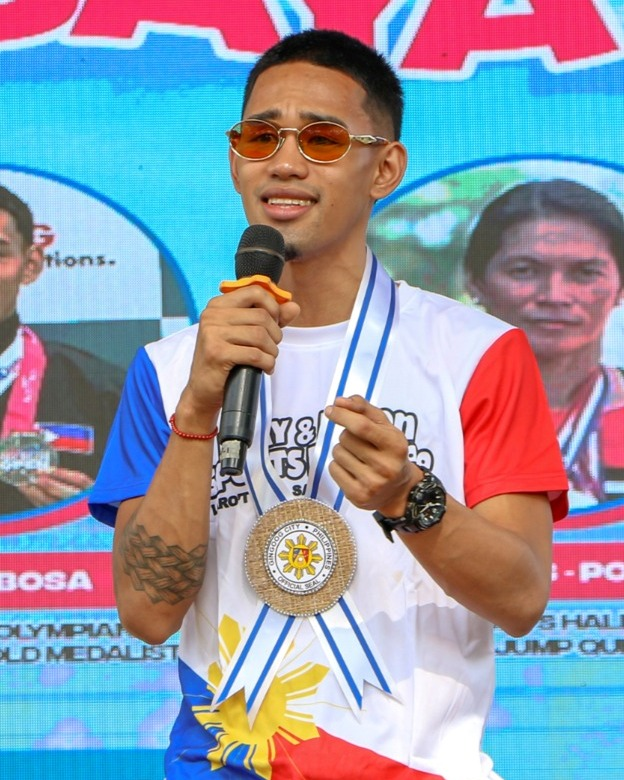
- Barbosa in 2025

Personal information
- Nationality: Filipino
- Born: June 8, 1999 (age 27)
- Home town: Bangued, Abra
- Height: 5'8
- Weight: −58 kg (−128 lb) category

Sport
- Country: Philippines
- Sport: Taekwondo
- Events: –54 kg, –58 kg
- University team: NU Bulldogs
- Club: One Mind Taekwondo (Abra)
- Coached by: Carlos Padilla
Medal record
Men's taekwondo
Representing Philippines
Asian Games
Silver medal – second place	2026 Aichi-Nagoya	58 kg
SEA Games
Gold medal – first place	2023 Cambodia	-54 kg
Gold medal – first place	2021 Vietnam	-54 kg
Gold medal – first place	2019 Philippines	-54 kg
Bronze medal – third place	2025 Thailand	-54 kg

Kurt Bryan Dela Vega Barbosa (born June 8, 1999) is a Filipino taekwondo athlete who competed in the 2020 Summer Olympics in Tokyo.

== Career ==
=== College ===
Barbosa, a student of the National University, has competed in the University Athletic Association of the Philippines (UAAP). In 2018 during UAAP Season 81, Barbosa competing in the finweight category was named Rookie Player of the Year and Most Valuable Player for the UAAP's taekwondo tournament.

=== National team ===
Kurt Barbosa, a native of Bangued, Abra, was scouted for the Philippine national team during his participation in the Philippine National Games where he represented his home province, and became part of the Philippine Taekwondo Association's grassroots program. Barbosa became part of the national team in 2019 and was placed under the tutelage of coach Carlos Padilla.

He participated in the 2019 World Taekwondo Championships in the men's finweight category, although he failed to advance from the Round of 64 after his Thai opponent Ramnarong Sawekwiharee eliminated him from the tournament.

Barbosa competed at the 2019 Southeast Asian Games, which was hosted at home in the Philippines. He clinched a gold medal for the host delegation in taekwondo by besting the men's -54 kg category.

==== 2020 Summer Olympics ====
Barbosa qualified for the 2020 Summer Olympics in Tokyo, which was delayed by a year due to the COVID-19 pandemic, through the 2021 Asian Qualification Tournament in Amman, Jordan. He qualified for the Olympics through a top two finish, by beating Jordanian athlete Zaid Alhalawani despite trailing behind his opponent 12 seconds prior to the end of their match. He is the first Filipino taekwondo male athlete to qualify since Tshomlee Go who competed in the 2008 Summer Olympics

Competing in the Men's −58 kg, Barbosa was scheduled to fight against top-ranked South Korean athlete Jang Jun, who also won gold in the 2019 World Taekwondo Championships, in the Round of 16. Barbosa suffered a defeat, but still could have figure in the repechage to potentially clinch a bronze medal if Jang progressed all the way to the final. However Jang lost to Mohamed Khalil Jendoubi of Tunisia in the semifinal, ending Barbosa's Olympic medal bid.

== Personal life ==
Kurt Bryan Barbosa's younger brother Kurt Maverick is also a taekwondo athlete. The elder Barbosa was encouraged by his father to take up taekwondo despite dreaming up on growing up as professional basketball player.
