= Taekwondo at the 2023 European Games – Men's 58 kg =

Taekwondo competition

Men's 58 kg at the 2023 European Games
- Venue: Krynica-Zdrój Arena
- Date: 23 June
- Competitors: 16 from 16 nations

Medalists
gold medal	Adrián Vicente	Spain
silver medal	Jack Woolley	Ireland
bronze medal	Cyrian Ravet	France
bronze medal	Gashim Magomedov	Azerbaijan

The men's 58 kg competition in taekwondo at the 2023 European Games took place on 23 June at the Krynica-Zdrój Arena.

== Schedule ==
All times are Central European Summer Time (UTC+2).

Date	Time	Event
Friday, 23 June 2023	09:12	Round of 16
Friday, 23 June 2023	14:12	Quarterfinals
Friday, 23 June 2023	15:48	Semifinals
Friday, 23 June 2023	16:36	Repechage
Friday, 23 June 2023	19:12	Bronze medal bouts
Friday, 23 June 2023	20:36	Final

== Results ==
Round of 16
Jack Woolley (IRL)	12	14
Josef Alami (SWE)	2	2
Mohammed Nour (GBR)	9	8
Ömer Faruk Dayıoğlu (TUR)	5	3
Dionysios Rapsomanikis (GRE)	8	14
Matias Lomartire (ITA)	9	15
Cemal Can Malkoç (GER)	4	9
Łukasz Nowak (POL)	3	2
Adrián Vicente (ESP)	20	13
Dmitriy Nagaev (ISR)	10	1
Aymen Achnine (NED)	4	0
Gashim Magomedov (AZE)	17	13
Sharif Gergely Salim (HUN)	16	14	28
Serghei Uscov (MDA)	18	2	25
Rui Bragança (POR)	2	10
Cyrian Ravet (FRA)	4	10

Quarterfinals
Jack Woolley (IRL)	13	16	10
Mohammed Nour (GBR)	12	18	10
Matias Lomartire (ITA)	22^{P}	15^{P}
Cemal Can Malkoç (GER)	17	3
Adrián Vicente (ESP)	14	10
Gashim Magomedov (AZE)	11	6
Sharif Gergely Salim (HUN)	1	1
Cyrian Ravet (FRA)	4	9

Semifinals
Jack Woolley (IRL)	17	27
Matias Lomartire (ITA)	12	9
Adrián Vicente (ESP)	9	7	8
Cyrian Ravet (FRA)	1	9	5

Final
Jack Woolley (IRL)	13	3	11
Adrián Vicente (ESP)	11	5	14

=== Repechage ===
Repechage				Bronze medal bout
				Cyrian Ravet (FRA)	13^{P}	7
Mohammed Nour (GBR)	14	15^{P}	9	Mohammed Nour (GBR)	10	2
Josef Alami (SWE)	13	4	5
Dmitriy Nagaev (ISR)	5	6
Gashim Magomedov (AZE)	12	19		Gashim Magomedov (AZE)	13	22
				Matias Lomartire (ITA)	5	4
