= 2022 African Taekwondo Championships =

The 2022 African Taekwondo Championships was held in Kigali, Rwanda on 16 and 17 July 2022

== Results ==
Category	City and date
senior male -54	African Championships: Kigali 16.07.2022
1.	AMADOU, Mahamadou
2.	EL HACHAM, Hamza
3.	OCIRA, Oswaldo
3.	NDIAYE, Baye Galass
senior male -58	African Championships: Kigali 16.07.2022
1.	JENDOUBI, Mohamed Khalil
2.	LAKEHAL, Omar
3.	DIAKITE, Issa
3.	MANSOUR, Mostafa
senior male -63	African Championships: Kigali 16.07.2022
1.	WASFI, Abdelbasset
2.	NASSAR, Ahmed
3.	CHIPKAOU KOCHE, Maman Mansour
3.	BOUJEMAI, Fares
senior male -68	African Championships: Kigali 16.07.2022
1.	KOBENAN, Aaron Francois
2.	MAIGA, Ibrahim
3.	SAIDI, Faical
3.	BARAKAT, Eyad
senior male -74	African Championships: Kigali 16.07.2022
1.	KATOUSI, Firas
2.	EISSA, Rami
3.	OLOWOOKERE, Olusola
3.	EL YAQINI, Ayoub
senior male -80	African Championships: Kigali 16.07.2022
1.	EISSA, Seif
2.	SAWADOGO, Faysal
3.	BOATRIS, Youssef
senior male -87	African Championships: Kigali 16.07.2022
1.	RAWY, Ahmad
2.	CISSE, Cheick Sallah
3.	COULIBALI, Ali Yazbeck
3.	ELASBI, Soufiane
senior male +87	African Championships: Kigali 16.07.2022
1.	BASSEL, Ayoub
2.	OKUOMOSE, Benjamin
3.	OBAME, Anthony Mylann
3.	ANN, Alasan
senior female -46	African Championships: Kigali 16.07.2022
1.	SAHIB, Soukaina
2.	ABDOU BILANE, Zaraou
3.	AHMED, Habiba
3.	SIBY, Aissata Mohamed
senior female -49	African Championships: Kigali 16.07.2022
1.	ELAASAL, Nezha
2.	SAMY ELHOSSEINY, Shahd
3.	KULA, Karabo
3.	WAKOLI, Sharon
senior female -53	African Championships: Kigali 16.07.2022
1.	EL BOUCHTI, Oumaima
2.	AOUN ben, Ouhoud
3.	SARR, Ndeye Maty
3.	EZAT, Maram
senior female -57	African Championships: Kigali 16.07.2022
1.	NABIL SEDDIK, Ashrakat
1.	LAARAJ, Nada
3.	EGAGNE, Marie
3.	CISSE, Mariama
senior female -62	African Championships: Kigali 16.07.2022
1.	SALIH, Safia
2.	IBO, Koumba Nanah Helene
3.	DIAW, Yacine
3.	MAHMOUD, Nadine
senior female -67	African Championships: Kigali 16.07.2022
1.	GBAGBI, Ruth Marie Christelle
2.	SHEHATA, Aya
3.	ANYANACHO, Elizabeth Oluchi
3.	UMUHOZA, Adinette
senior female -73	African Championships: Kigali 16.07.2022
1.	FAROUK, Maisoun
2.	SABIR, Dounia
3.	OLOO, Everlyn Aluoch
3.	MOUEGA, Urgence
senior female +73	African Championships: Kigali 16.07.2022
1.	ABOUFARAS, Fatima-Ezzahra
2.	TRAORE, Aminata Charlene
3.	OGALLO, Faith Wanjiku
3.	MUNAVE, Carlota
