= Mohamed Khalil Jendoubi =

Tunisian taekwondo practitioner

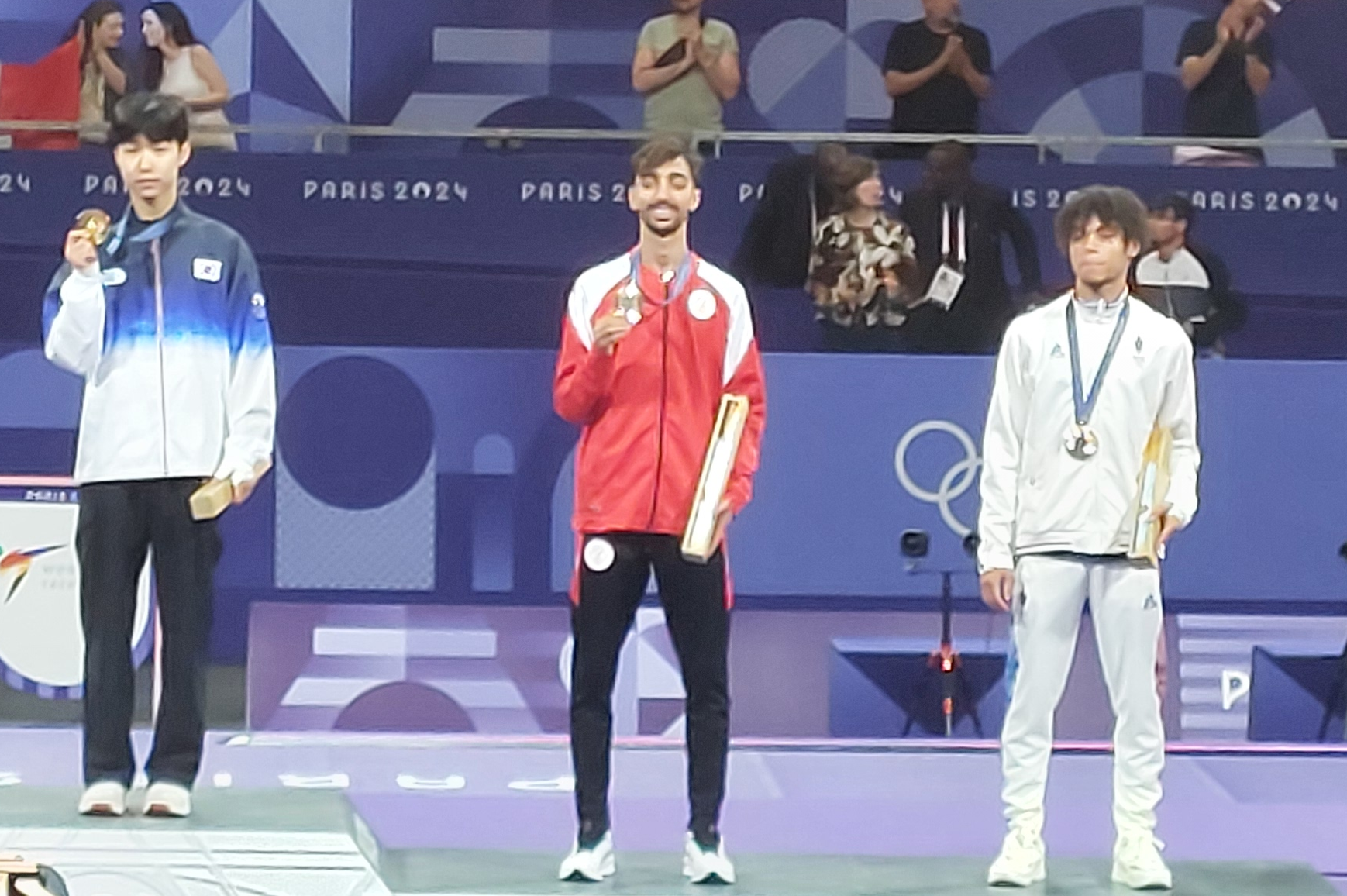
- Jendoubi (centre) at the 2024 Summer Olympics

Personal information
- Native name: محمد خليل الجندوبي
- Born: 1 June 2002 (age 24)
- Height: 185 cm (6 ft 1 in)

Sport
- Country: Tunisia
- Sport: Taekwondo
- Weight class: 58 kg
Medal record
Men's taekwondo
Representing Tunisia
Olympic Games
Silver medal – second place	2020 Tokyo	58 kg
Bronze medal – third place	2024 Paris	58 kg
World Championships
Gold medal – first place	2025 Wuxi	63 kg
Bronze medal – third place	2022 Guadalajara	58 kg
African Games
Gold medal – first place	2019 Rabat	54 kg
Gold medal – first place	2023 Accra	63 kg
African Championships
Gold medal – first place	2021 Dakar	58 kg
Gold medal – first place	2022 Kigali	58 kg
Gold medal – first place	2023 Abidjan	63 kg
World University Games
Bronze medal – third place	2025 Rhine-Ruhr	63 kg
Mediterranean Games
Silver medal – second place	2026 Taranto	68 kg
Youth Olympic Games
Bronze medal – third place	2018 Buenos Aires	48 kg

Mohamed Khalil Jendoubi (Arabic: محمد خليل الجندوبي, born 1 June 2002) is a Tunisian taekwondo practitioner. Representing Tunisia at the 2020 Summer Olympics held in Tokyo, Japan, he won silver in the men's 58 kg taekwondo event.

== Career ==
Mohamed Khalil Jendoubi first gained recognition in the youth categories, winning the gold medal in the under-48 kg category at the 2018 African Youth Games in Algiers, Algeria and the bronze medal at the 2018 Summer Youth Olympics in Buenos Aires, Argentina.

In 2019, he competed at the African Games in Rabat, Morocco, where he won the gold medal in the –54 kg event.

In 2021, he continued to shine on the African continent by winning the gold medal in the 58 kg event at the African Championships in Dakar, Senegal. That same year, Jendoubi competed at the 2020 Summer Olympics in Tokyo, Japan. He won the silver medal in the men's 58 kg event, establishing himself on the international scene.

In 2022, Jendoubi demonstrated winning the gold medal in the 58 kg event at the African Championships in Kigali, Rwanda. Following his momentum, he won the bronze medal at the 2022 World Taekwondo Championships in Guadalajara, Mexico. On 4 November of the same year, he took the top spot in the world ranking of taekwondo players according to the World Taekwondo ranking, ahead of Vito Dell'Aquila and Jang Jun.

The year 2023 was particularly fruitful for Mohamed Khalil Jendoubi, who won the gold medal in the 63 kg event at the African Games in Accra, Ghana, as well as another gold medal in the same category at the African Championships in Abidjan, Côte d'Ivoire.

In 2024, he added another medal to his list of achievements by winning the bronze medal in the men's 58 kg event at the Olympic Games in Paris, France.

== Achievements ==
=== Summer Olympic Games ===
Event	Location	Weight class	Ranking
2018 Summer Youth Olympics	Buenos Aires, Argentina	48 Kg	Bronze
2020 Summer Olympics	Tokyo, Japan	58 Kg	Silver
2024 Summer Olympics	Paris, France	58 Kg	Bronze

=== World Championships ===
Event	Location	Weight class	Ranking
2022 World Championships	Guadalajara, Mexico	58 Kg	Bronze
2023 World Championships	Baku, Azerbaidjan	58 Kg	QF

=== Grand Prix ===
Edition	Weight	GP 1	GP 2	GP 3	GP Final
2022	58 Kg	Silver (Italy) Rome	Silver (France) Paris	Silver (United Kingdom) Manchester	Silver (Saudi Arabia) Riyadh
2023	58 Kg	^{?} (Italy) Rome	Bronze (France) Paris	Gold (China) Taiyuan	4th (United Kingdom) Manchester

=== African Games ===
Event	Location	Weight class	Ranking
2019 African Games	Rabat, Morocco	58 Kg	Gold
2023 African Games	Accra, Ghana	63 Kg	Gold

=== African Championships ===
Event	Location	Weight class	Ranking
2021 African Championships	Dakar, Senegal	58 Kg	Gold
2022 African Championships	Kigali, Rwanda	58 Kg	Gold
2023 African Championships	Abidjan, Ivory Coast	63 Kg	Gold

== Decoration ==
- First Class of the National Order of Merit (Tunisia, 20 August 2021)
- First Class of the National Order of Merit (Tunisia, 16 August 2024)
