= Jack Woolley (taekwondo) =

Irish taekwondo athlete (born 1996)

Jack Woolley OLY
Personal information
- Born: 23 September 1998 (age 27) Tallaght, Dublin, Ireland

Sport
- Sport: Taekwondo
Medal record
Representing Ireland
Men's taekwondo
Grand Prix
| Bronze medal – third place | Roma 2018 | 58 kg |
| Bronze medal – third place | Manchester 2022 | 58 kg |
European Games
| Silver medal – second place | 2023 Kraków-Małopolska | 58 kg |
European Championships
| Silver medal – second place | Manchester 2022 | 58 kg |
European Junior Championships
| Silver medal – second place | 2015 Daugavspils | 55 kg |

Jack Woolley OLY (born 23 September 1998) is an Irish taekwondo athlete.

== Career ==
He represented Ireland at the 2020 Summer Olympics in the men's 58 kg category. Woolley was defeated by Argentinian Lucas Guzmán in the round of 16.

Woolley won a silver medal at the 2023 European Games in the 58 kg weight category eventually losing in the Final to Spaniard Adrián Vicente.

Woolley Qualified for his second Olympics after qualifying through the European Qualification Tournament at the Olympic he was defeated by Azerbaijani Gashim Magomedov in his opening but Qualified for the Repechage due to Magomedov Qualifying for the Final, but he lost to Adrian Vicente.

He represented Ireland at the 2024 Summer Olympics in the men's 58 kg category. Woolley was defeated in the round of 16.

== Personal life ==
Woolley is bisexual. He has been in a relationship with his partner Dave Stig since 2021. On 17 March 2025, Woolley announced his engagement to Stig shortly after he competed in the Dancing with the Stars final.

On the night of Friday 13 August 2021, five days after the 2020 Summer Olympics ended, Woolley was hospitalised after being severely attacked by "a gang of 8 to 12 men and women" in Dublin. After he posted pictures of himself with blood all over his clothes, online fans expressed their support for him. Woolley was hailed as an "inspiration and role model" after he opened up to Ryan Tubridy on The Late Late Show on 17 September about the assault.

== Media career ==
In December 2024 it was announced that Woolley would be competing in the eighth season of RTÉ's Dancing with the Stars. He was paired with Alex Vladimirov as his professional dance partner.

| Week No. | Dance/Song | Judges' score | | | | Total | Result |
|---|---|---|---|---|---|---|---|
| Week No. | Dance/Song | Redmond | Byrne | Barry | Gourounlian | Total | Result |
| 1 | Viennese waltz / "Die with a Smile" | 7 | 8 | 7 | 8 | 30 | No elimination |
| 2 | Cha-cha-cha / "Rush" | 8 | 8 | 8 | 8 | 32 | No elimination |
| 3 | Jive / "Stay" | 8 | 8 | 8 | 9 | 33 | Safe |
| 4 | Tango / Joker: Folie à Deux | 7 | 8 | | 8 | 23/30 | Safe |
| 5 | American Smooth / "Grace" | 9 | 10 | 9 | 10 | 38 | No elimination |
| 6 | Pasodoble / "Cha Cha Cha" | 8 | 9 | 9 | 9 | 35 | Immune |
| 7 | Contemporary Ballroom / "You Got the Love" | 10 | 10 | 10 | 10 | 40 | Safe |
| 8 | Samba / "The Cup of Life" | 9 | 9 | 9 | 10 | 37 | Safe |
| 9 | Quickstep / "Austin" | 8 | 9 | 9 | 9 | 35 | Safe |
| 9 | Team Freestyle / "Footloose" | 8 | 9 | 9 | 9 | 35 | Safe |
| 10 | Salsa / "Red Alert" | 10 | 10 | 10 | 10 | 44 | Bottom Two |
| 10 | Scare-a-thon / "Time Warp" | 4 | | | | 44 | Bottom Two |
