= Bae Jun-seo =

South Korean taekwondo practitioner

Personal information
- Nationality: South Korean
- Born: 25 December 2000 (age 25)
- Height: 172 cm (5 ft 8 in)

Sport
- Sport: Taekwondo
- Events: 54 kg, 58 kg
Medal record
Men's taekwondo
Representing South Korea
World Championships
Gold medal – first place	2019 Manchester	54 kg
Gold medal – first place	2023 Baku	58 kg
Bronze medal – third place	2022 Guadalajara	54 kg
Grand Prix
Gold medal – first place	2025 Muju	58 kg
Gold medal – first place	2026 Muju	58 kg
Silver medal – second place	2025 Charlotte	58 kg
Grand Slam
Gold medal – first place	2019 Wuxi	58 kg
Asian Championships
Gold medal – first place	2021 Beirut	54 kg
Gold medal – first place	2022 Chuncheon	58 kg
Bronze medal – third place	2024 Da Nang	54 kg
World Junior Championships
Gold medal – first place	2016 Burnaby	45 kg
Asian Junior Championships
Gold medal – first place	2017 Atyrau	48 kg
- Updated on 16 May 2019

Bae Jun-seo (born 25 December 2000) is a South Korean taekwondo practitioner and two-time world champion.

== Career ==
=== Junior ===
At the 2016 World Taekwondo Junior Championships, Bae Jun-seo won the gold medal in the 45 kg event.

=== Senior ===
He won the gold medal at the 2019 World Taekwondo Championships in the men's 54 kg event.

In 2022, he won the bronze medal at the 2022 World Taekwondo Championships in the men's 54 kg event.

At the 2023 World Taekwondo Championships, he won the gold medal in the men's 58 kg event.
