= Omar Hantoli =

Palestinian taekwondo practitioner (born 2005)

Personal information
- Other names: Omar Yaser Ismail
- Nationality: Palestinian
- Born: Omar Yaser Abdel Qader Ismail Hantoli; 3 November 2005 (age 21) Sharjah or Dubai, United Arab Emirates
- Home town: Sharjah, United Arab Emirates

Sport
- Country: Palestine
- Sport: Taekwondo
- Weight class: −58 kg; −63 kg
Medal record
Men's taekwondo
Representing Palestine
World Junior Championships
Bronze medal – third place	2022 Sofia	59 kg

Omar Yaser Abdel Qader Ismail Hantoli (Note: Also romanized as Hantouli.) (Arabic: عمر ياسر عبد القادر إسماعيل حنتولي; born 3 November 2005), known as simply Omar Yaser Ismail or Omar Hantoli, is a Palestinian taekwondo practitioner. He qualified for the 2024 Paris Olympics in the −58 kg division.

== Early life ==
Hantoli was born in the United Arab Emirates to Palestinians from the West Bank town of Jenin, who had settled in Sharjah in 2003, and was raised in his birth country. He started taekwondo between the ages of 9 and 10, training in Sharjah, and was competing in international competitions by the time he was 12 years old.

== Career ==
Hantoli won a bronze medal at the Cadet World Championships in Tashkent, Uzbekistan, in August 2019. He competed at the 2021 Islamic Solidarity Games in Konya, Turkey. He won a bronze at the 2022 World Taekwondo Junior Championships in Sofia, Bulgaria, in August 2022. He competed at the Senior World Championships in 2022 and 2023, and in the 2022 Asian Games in Hangzhou, China.

In March 2024, competing at the 2024 Asian Taekwondo Olympic Qualification Tournament in Tai'an, China, in the −58 kg category, Hantoli won the Olympic qualification and competed in the category at the 2024 Olympics for Palestine, becoming not only the first Palestinian taekwondo athlete to earn a qualification place at the Olympic Games, but the first in any combat sport. At the event, he was eliminated in the round of 16, ultimately ranking 11th. Hantoli served as national flagbearer at the closing ceremony alongside swimmer Valerie Tarazi.
