= Nouridine Issaka =

Nigerien taekwondo athlete

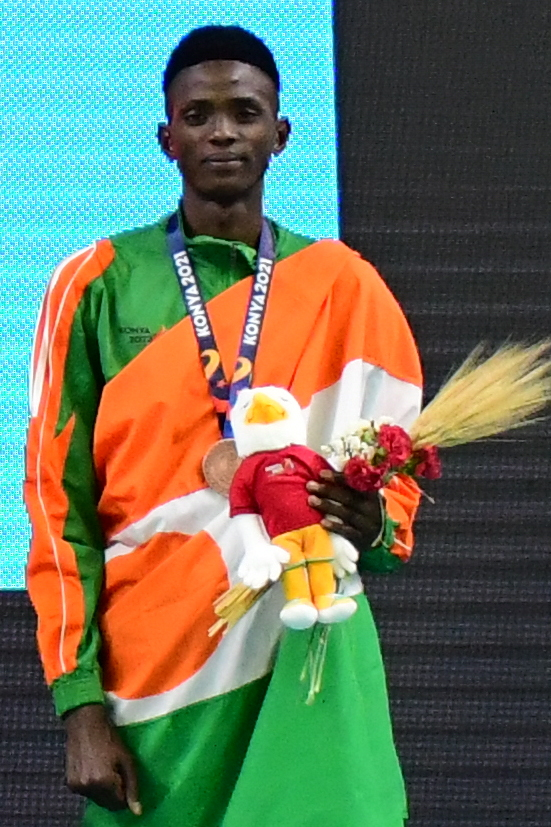
- 2021 Islamic Solidarity Games (2022)

Personal information
- Full name: Nouridine Garba Issaka
- Nationality: Nigerien
- Born: 28 October 2005 (age 20)
Medal record
Men's taekwondo
Representing Niger
African Games
Gold medal – first place	2023 Accra	58 kg
African Championships
Gold medal – first place	2023 Abidjan	58 kg
World Junior Championships
Bronze medal – third place	2022 Sofia	55 kg
Islamic Solidarity Games
Bronze medal – third place	2021 Konya	58 kg

Nouridine Garba Issaka (born 28 October 2005) is a taekwondo athlete from Niger. He won a gold medal at the 2023 All Africa Games and a gold medal at the 2023 African Taekwondo Championships.

== Career ==
He competed at the Islamic Solidarity Games and won bronze in the Men's 58 kg in Konya, Turkey.

In 2022 in Sofia, Bulgaria, he won bronze in the -55kg category at the 2022 World Taekwondo Junior Championships.

He reached the quarter finals at the 2023 World Taekwondo Championships in the Men's flyweight category in Baku.

In November 2023, at the age of 18 years-old, he won gold in the 58kg at the African Taekwondo Championships, held in Abidjan, Ivory Coast.

He won a gold medal in the -58kg category in March 2024 at the delayed 2023 African Games in Accra, Ghana.

He competed in the −58 kg category at the 2024 African Taekwondo Olympic Qualification Tournament in Dakar, Senegal and qualified for the 2024 Paris Olympics.
