= Cyrian Ravet =

French taekwondo practitioner

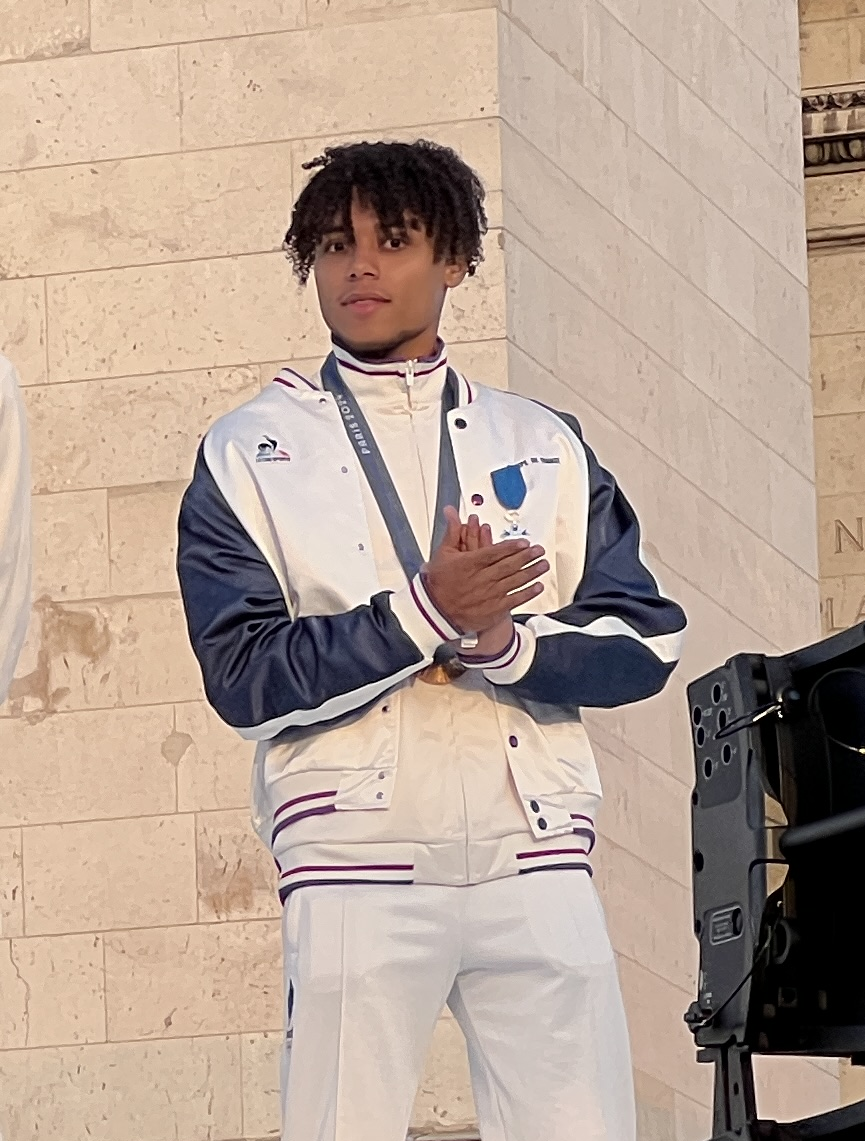
- Ravet in 2024

Personal information
- Nationality: French
- Born: Cyrian Ravet; 5 September 2002 (age 24) Lyon, France
- Height: 175 cm (5 ft 9 in)
- Weight: 58 kg (128 lb)

Sport
- Country: France
- Sport: Taekwondo
- Event: 58 kg
- University team: INSEP
- Club: Taekwondo Asnières Elite
- Coached by: Ekvara Kamkasoumphou
Medal record
Men's taekwondo
Representing France
Olympic Games
Bronze medal – third place	2024 Paris	58 kg
Grand Prix
Gold medal – first place	2022 Paris	58 kg
Bronze medal – third place	2022 Riyadh (F)	58 kg
European Games
Bronze medal – third place	2023 Kraków-Małopolska	58 kg
European Championships
Gold medal – first place	2021 Sofia	58 kg
Gold medal – first place	2022 Manchester	58 kg
Silver medal – second place	2026 Munich	63 kg
European Championships OWC
Gold medal – first place	2020 Sarajevo	58 kg
European Junior Championships
Bronze medal – third place	2019 Marina D'Or	59 kg

Cyrian Ravet (born 5 September 2002) is a French taekwondo athlete. He won the gold medal at the 2021 European Taekwondo Championships men's 58 kg.
