= Omar Salim =

Hungarian taekwondo practitioner (born 2003)

Personal information
- Born: Omar Gergely Salim; 12 April 2003 (age 23) Carson, California, U.S.
- Weight: 54 kg (119 lb)

Sport
- Country: Hungary
- Sport: Taekwondo
- Event(s): Finweight; Flyweight
- Club: Salim's Taekwondo Center; MTK Budapest (2019–)
- Coached by: Gergely Salim (father)
Medal record
Men's taekwondo
Representing Hungary
World Championships
Gold medal – first place	2022 Guadalajara	54 kg
European Championships
Gold medal – first place	2021 Sofia	54 kg
Gold medal – first place	2022 Manchester	54 kg
Gold medal – first place	2024 Belgrade	63 kg
Bronze medal – third place	2026 Munich	63 kg
European Junior Championships
Bronze medal – third place	2019 Marina D'Or	45 kg
Representing United States
Pan American Junior Championships
Gold medal – first place	2019 Portland	45 kg

Omar Gergely Salim (born 12 April 2003) is an American-Hungarian taekwondo athlete. He is the youngest son of Gergely Salim, a former Olympic champion. He became a Hungarian citizen in 2022.

== Career ==
He won the gold medal at the 2021 European Taekwondo Championships men's 54 kg. A month later, he qualified to the 2020 Summer Olympics through the 2021 European Taekwondo Olympic Qualification Tournament. At the Taekwondo event of the Tokyo Olympics he was not able to go beyond the preliminary round.

== Personal life ==
He is the youngest son of former Olympic, world and European champion Gergely Salim. He is of Tanzanian and Hungarian descent through his father. His uncle József Salim, was also a 6-time European medalist for Hungary. His brother and training partner, Shariff Salim, was Pan American Junior champion in 2019, alongside him.

One of his main supporters and sponsors is Swedish footballer Zlatan Ibrahimović, as he used to train with master Gergely Salim at his dojang Salim's Taekwondo Center in Los Angeles. Zlatan played for LA Galaxy from 2018 to 2019 and was always passionate about taekwondo.
