= Gashim Magomedov =

Azerbaijani taekwondo practitioner (born 1999)

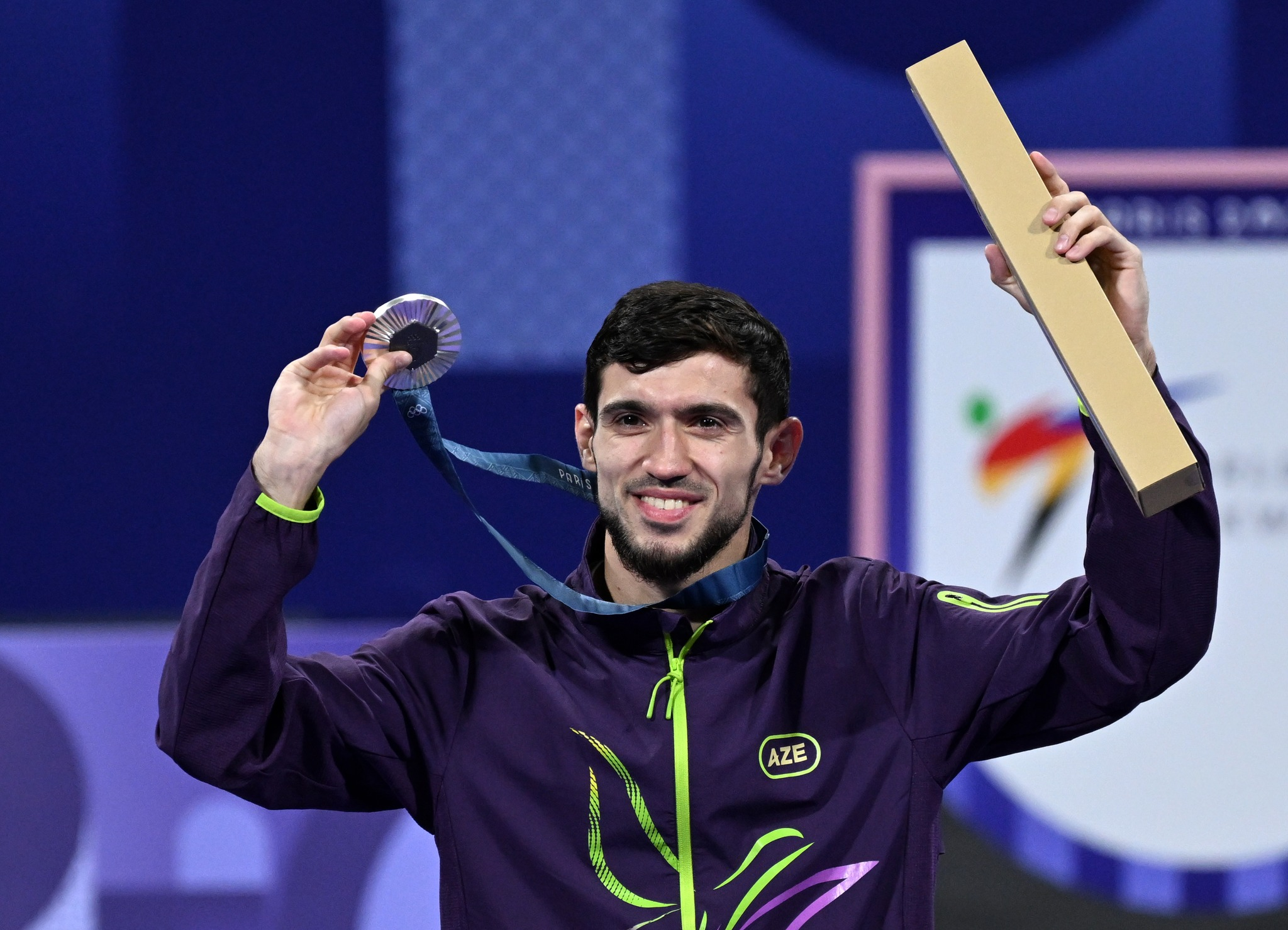
- Magomedov at the 2024 Summer Olympics awarding ceremony

Personal information
- Born: 22 September 1999 (age 26) Makhachkala, Dagestan, Russia

Sport
- Sport: Taekwondo
- University team: Dagestan State University
Medal record
Representing Azerbaijan
Olympic Games
Silver medal – second place	2024 Paris	58 kg
World Championships
Bronze medal – third place	2025 Wuxi	58 kg
European Championships
Bronze medal – third place	2024 Belgrade	58 kg
European Games
Bronze medal – third place	2023 Krakow	58 kg
Islamic Solidarity Games
Silver medal – second place	2017 Baku	54 kg
Bronze medal – third place	2021 Konya	58 kg
Bronze medal – third place	2025 Riyadh	60 kg
World Junior Championships
Silver medal – second place	2016 Burnaby	55 kg
European Junior Championships
Bronze medal – third place	2015 Daugavspils	48 kg

Gashim Magomedov (Azerbaijani: Qaşım Maqomedov; born 22 September 1999) is an Azerbaijani taekwondo practitioner.

== Career ==
He won bronze at the 2021 Islamic Solidarity Games in Konya, Turkey in August 2022.

Magomedov was a bronze medalist at the 2023 European Games in Poland in the Men's 58 kg in June 2023. He won bronze at the Qatar International Taekwondo Open held in Doha in October 2023. In November 2023, he won gold at Balkan Cup 2023 in the 63 kg division. He won the Grand Slam Champions Series held in Wuxi, China in December 2023.

Magomedov was a bronze medalist at the 2024 European Taekwondo Championships in the Men's 58 kg category.

Magomedov participated in the 2024 Summer Olympics in Paris where he won the silver medal and he reached the finals match, but could not collect the silver medal on the podium due to a heavy injury suffered in the competition.

He was selected to compete at the 2025 World Taekwondo Championships in Wuxi, China, in October 2025, in the men's flyweight division, winning the bronze medal.

In June 2026, at the Grand Prix taekwondo tournament in Rome, Gashim Magomedov (58 kg) won a bronze medal.
