= Bailey Lewis =

Australian taekwondo practitioner

Personal information
- Full name: Bailey Malcolm Lewis
- Nationality: Australian
- Born: 12 November 1997 (age 28) Werribee, Australia

Sport
- Sport: Taekwondo
- Weight class: Lightweight

Bailey Malcolm Lewis (born 7 November 1997) is an Australian taekwondo practitioner.

== Career ==
Lewis attained a world ranking of No. 20 in 2017 and won the Dutch Open in 2018. He had a fifth-place finish at the 2019 World Taekwondo Championships. He won a bronze medal at the 2022 Korean Open. He also won bronze at the Paris World Taekwondo Grand Prix in 2022 and again in 2023.

He trained at the National Performance Centre in Melbourne under the guidance of National Team Coach Seokhun Lee. In April 2024, he won gold at the Oceania Olympic qualifying tournament defeating Issac Myrle in the -58 kg division.

He was officially selected to compete for Australia at the 2024 Summer Olympics in Paris in the men's -58 kg category in May 2024.

== Personal life ==
He is from Werribee, a suburb of Melbourne. He trained at City West Taekwondo in Hoppers Crossing. He hosted online video interactive sessions as part of Australian Taekwondo's COVID-19 response initiative in 2020.
