= Mohsen Rezaee (taekwondo) =

Afghan taekwondo practitioner (born 1998)

Personal information
- Nationality: Afghan
- Born: 30 January 1998 (age 28)
- Height: 184 cm (6 ft 0 in)
- Weight: 58 kg (128 lb; 9 st 2 lb)

Sport
- Coached by: Min Sin-Hak
Medal record
Men's taekwondo
Representing Afghanistan
Asian Championships
Gold medal – first place	2021 Beirut	58 Kg
Asian Games
Bronze medal – third place	2022 Hangzhou	58 Kg
Islamic Solidarity Games
Silver medal – second place	2025 Riyadh	60 kg

Mohsen Rezaee (born 30 January 1998) is an Afghan taekwondo practitioner and member of the national taekwondo team in Afghanistan.

== Career ==
He is the first person in Afghanistan's history to become the Asian champion, and the best Taekwondo fighter in Afghanistan for three years in succession.

Mohsen Rezaee had been become a member of 'CAN Home appliances team' in Iran premier league in 2018, and he fought for the 'Refugee Taekwondo athletes center team' in Iran premier league in 2019, moreover he made an official deal with 'Sanat Mes Kerman' in Iran premier league for two years in 2020.

In addition, he became the Asian champion in 2021. This championship took place in Lebanon while this is the first championship of an Afghan athlete in Asia, so that no one in Afghanistan couldn't win such Asian gold medal among all Olympic sport fields so far. He is 17th in the world rankings at the moment, and among all Afghan Taekwondo fighters has the highest world rankings.

In 2023, Rezaee was joint-flagbearer with Kimia Yousufi at the opening ceremony of the 2022 Asian Games. He won a bronze medal at the Asian Games.
