= Jang Jun =

South Korean taekwondo practitioner (born 2000)

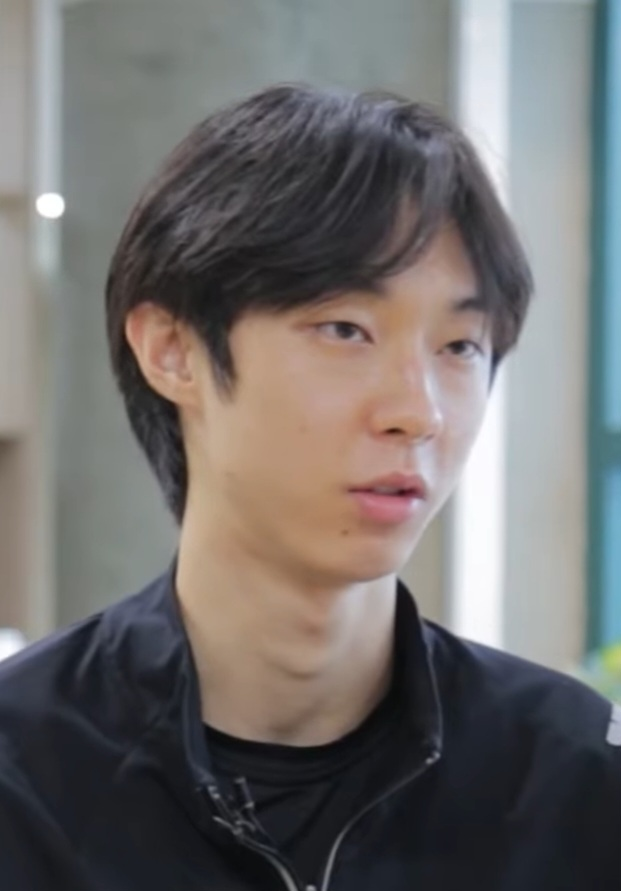

Personal information
- Nationality: South Korean
- Born: April 16, 2000 (age 26)
- Height: 184 cm (6 ft 0 in)
- Weight: 58 kg (128 lb)

Sport
- Sport: Taekwondo
- Event: Flyweight
- University team: Korea National Sport University
- Club: KOGAS
- Coached by: Jae-hyun Shin
Medal record
Men's taekwondo
Representing South Korea
Olympic Games
Bronze medal – third place	2020 Tokyo	58 kg
World Championships
Gold medal – first place	2019 Manchester	58 kg
Silver medal – second place	2022 Guadalajara	58 kg
Bronze medal – third place	2025 Wuxi	63 kg
Asian Games
Gold medal – first place	2022 Hangzhou	58 kg
Asian Championships
Gold medal – first place	2018 Ho Chi Minh City	54 kg
Gold medal – first place	2024 Da Nang	63 kg
Silver medal – second place	2026 Ulaanbaatar	63 kg
Grand Slam
Gold medal – first place	2018 Wuxi	58 kg
Silver medal – second place	2017 Wuxi	58 kg
Bronze medal – third place	2022 Wuxi	58 kg
Grand Prix
Gold medal – first place	2018 Moscow	58 kg
Gold medal – first place	2018 Fujairah (F)	58 kg
Gold medal – first place	2019 Rome	58 kg
Gold medal – first place	2019 Chiba	58 kg
Gold medal – first place	2019 Sofia	58 kg
Gold medal – first place	2022 Rome	58 kg
Gold medal – first place	2022 Riyadh (F)	58 kg
Silver medal – second place	2019 Moscow (F)	58 kg
Silver medal – second place	2023 Taiyuan	58 kg
Bronze medal – third place	2018 Taoyuan	58 kg
Bronze medal – third place	2023 Rome	58 kg
World Junior Championships
Gold medal – first place	2016 Burnaby	51 kg
- Updated on 23 May 2026

Jang Jun (Korean: 장준; born April 16, 2000) is a South Korean taekwondo practitioner.

== Career ==
He won the gold medal at the 2018 Asian Taekwondo Championships on the -54 kg weight category, and has won two World Taekwondo Grand Prix titles in 2018. He has been licensed to compete in the Tokyo Olympics.

He won the silver medal in the men's flyweight event at the 2022 World Taekwondo Championships held in Guadalajara, Mexico.

He is part of KOGAS Taekwondo Team.
