= Vito Dell'Aquila =

Italian taekwondo practitioner

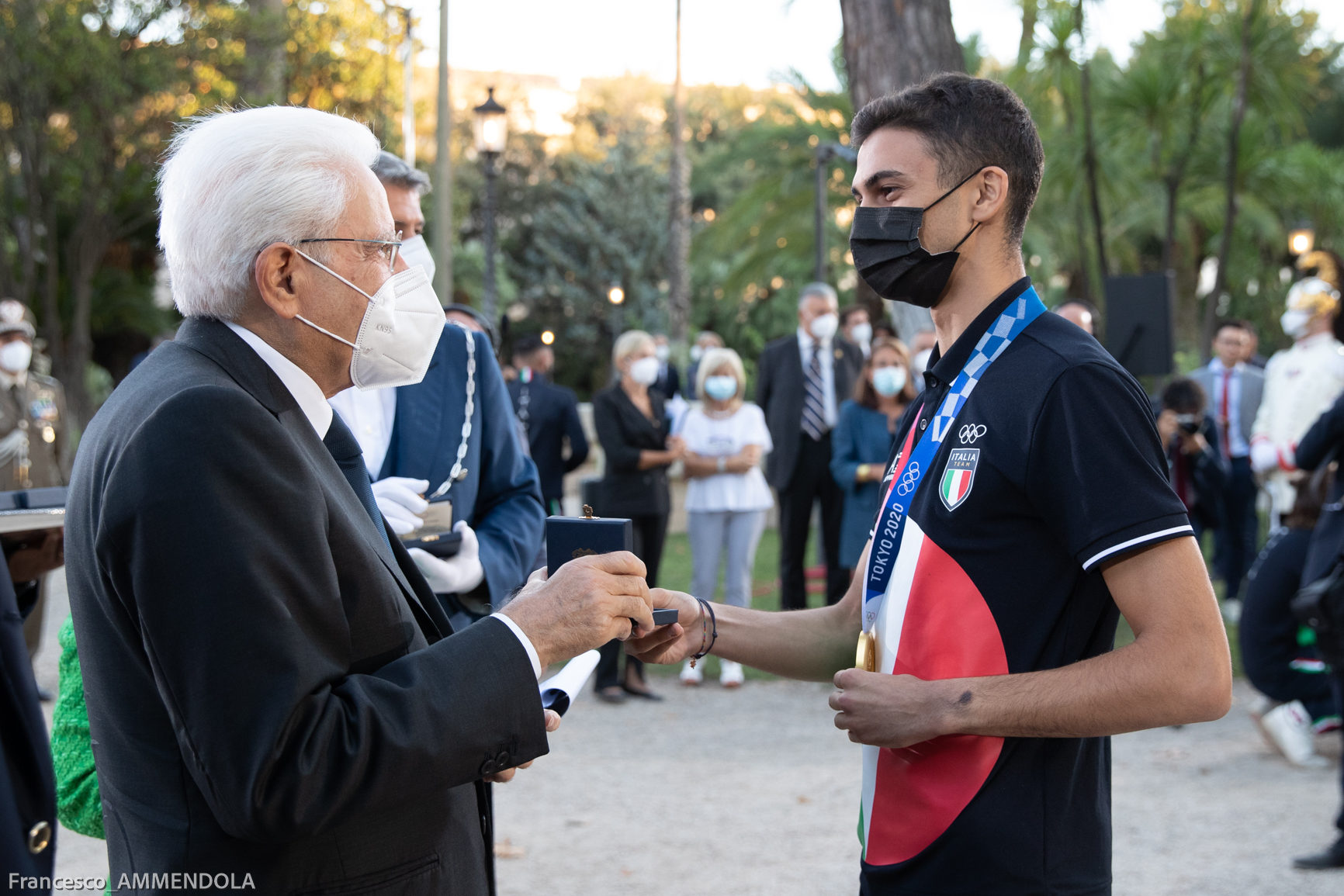
- Dell'Aquila awarded by Sergio Mattarella at Quirinale in 2021.

Personal information
- Nationality: Italian
- Born: November 3, 2000 (age 26) Mesagne, Italy
- Height: 179 cm (5 ft 10 in)
- Weight: 58 kg (128 lb)

Sport
- Sport: Taekwondo
- Weight class: Flyweight
- Club: Carabinieri Bologna
- Coached by: Roberto Baglivo (club); Claudio Nolano (national)
Medal record
Men's taekwondo
Representing Italy
Olympic Games
Gold medal – first place	2020 Tokyo	58 kg
World Championships
Gold medal – first place	2022 Guadalajara	58 kg
Bronze medal – third place	2017 Muju	54 kg
Grand Prix
Gold medal – first place	2019 Moscow (F)	58 kg
Gold medal – first place	2023 Manchester (F)	58 kg
Bronze medal – third place	2018 Moscow	58 kg
Bronze medal – third place	2018 Fujairah	58 kg
Bronze medal – third place	2019 Chiba	58 kg
Bronze medal – third place	2019 Sofia	58 kg
Bronze medal – third place	2022 Manchester	58 kg
European Championships
Gold medal – first place	2024 Belgrade	58 kg
Bronze medal – third place	2018 Kazan	54 kg
Bronze medal – third place	2022 Manchester	58 kg
European U21 Championships
Gold medal – first place	2017 Sofia	54 kg
European Junior Championships
Gold medal – first place	2015 Daugavpils	48 kg
Gold medal – first place	2017 Larnaca	55 kg
World Cadet Championships
Gold medal – first place	2014 Baku	49 kg

Vito Dell'Aquila (Italian pronunciation: [ˈviːto delˈlaːkwila]; born November 3, 2000) is an Italian taekwondo athlete. He won a gold medal at the 2020 Summer Olympics. He also won the gold medal in the men's flyweight event at the 2022 World Taekwondo Championships held in Guadalajara, Mexico.

== Career ==
On 25 June 2017 he won a bronze medal at the 2017 World Taekwondo Championships in Muju losing in the semifinals to the eventual world champion Kim Tae-hun in the Men's finweight (54 kg) competition.

On 24 July 2021, being ranked number 2 in the Men's 58 kg olympic ranking, he won the gold medal at the 2020 Summer Olympics beating the 2021 African champion, Mohamed Khalil Jendoubi, in the final of the Men's 58 kg.

== See also ==
- Italy at the 2020 Summer Olympics
