= Adrián Vicente =

Spanish taekwondo practitioner

Personal information
- Full name: Adrián Vicente Yunta
- Nationality: Spanish
- Born: 11 June 1999 (age 27) Madrid, Spain
- Home town: Madrid, Spain
- Height: 183 cm (6 ft 0 in)
- Weight: 58 kg (128 lb)

Sport
- Country: Spain
- Sport: Taekwondo
- Event: Men's 58 kg
- University team: Technical University of Madrid
Medal record
Men's taekwondo
Representing Spain
World Championships
Bronze medal – third place	2023 Baku	58 kg
Grand Prix
Gold medal – first place	2023 Rome	58 kg
Silver medal – second place	2023 Manchester (F)	58 kg
Bronze medal – third place	2018 Manchester	58 kg
Bronze medal – third place	2019 Chiba	58 kg
Bronze medal – third place	2022 Rome	58 kg
Bronze medal – third place	2022 Paris	58 kg
Bronze medal – third place	2023 Taiyuan	58 kg
European Games
Gold medal – first place	2023 Kraków-Małopolska	58 kg
European Championships
Gold medal – first place	2018 Kazan	54 kg
Silver medal – second place	2021 Sofia	58 kg
Bronze medal – third place	2022 Manchester	58 kg
Bronze medal – third place	2024 Belgrade	58 kg
Mediterranean Games
Gold medal – first place	2022 Oran	58 kg

Adrián Vicente Yunta (Note: In this Spanish name, the first or paternal surname is Vicente and the second or maternal family name is Yunta.) (born 11 June 1999) is a Spanish taekwondo athlete. He won the gold medal at the 2018 European Taekwondo Championships on the men's finweight category.

He won the gold medal in the men's 58 kg event at the 2022 Mediterranean Games held in Oran, Algeria.

Vicente competed for Spain at the 2024 Summer Olympics in the men's 58 kg event.
