= Judo at the 2025 Summer World University Games – Men's 100 kg =

Men's 100 kg at the 2025 Summer World University Games
- Venue: Messe Essen
- Location: Essen
- Dates: 25 July
- Competitors: 25

Medalists
| gold medal | Michał Jędrzejewski | Poland |
| silver medal | Nika Kharazishvili | Georgia |
| bronze medal | Nozomu Miki | Japan |
| bronze medal | Alexandru Sibișan | Romania |

The men's 100 kg at the 2025 Summer World University Games in Rhine-Ruhr, Germany was held 25 July 2025. Michał Jędrzejewski of Poland captured the gold medal. Nika Kharazishvili of Georgia took home the silver medal. The bronze medals were awarded to Nozomu Miki of Japan and Alexandru Sibișan of Romania.

== Schedule ==
All times are Central European Time (UTC+1)

| Date | Time | Event |
|---|---|---|
| 25 July 2015 | 10:00 | Preliminary Rounds |
| 25 July 2015 | 17:00 | Final Block |

== Results ==
Athletes advanced through direct knockout rounds—including the round of 32, round of 16, quarterfinals, and semifinals—to determine the two finalists fighting for the gold and silver medals. Parallel to the main bracket, a repechage system allowed defeated quarterfinalists to work their way back into the tournament, culminating in two separate bronze medal matches where the repechage winners faced the losing semifinalists.

Round of 32
T Narkus (LTU) | 000
D Namazli (AZE) | 100
O Yershov (UKR) | 000 (yellow card)
G Arévalo (BRA) | 001 (yellow card)
P Arias (ECU) | 000 (yellow card)
N Kharazishvili (GEO) | 112
R Amaro (ESP) | 000
K Kappelmeier (GER) | 010 (yellow card)
M Turanský (SVK) | 010
G Karapetyan (ARM) | 000
M Vrhovnik (SLO) | 000
M Jędrzejewski (POL) | 020
H Sharma (IND) | 000
A Sibișan (ROU) | 100
R Ferguson (USA) | 000 (yellow card)
V Ghimbovschi (MDA) | 011 (yellow card)
S Khan (PAK) | 001 (yellow card)
D Poltushev (KGZ) | 100

Round of 16
N Miki (JPN) | 100
D Namazli (AZE) | 000
G Arévalo (BRA) | 000
N Kharazishvili (GEO) | 100
MA Mataev (AIN) | 000
K Kappelmeier (GER) | 101
B Baitas (KAZ) | 111
M Turanský (SVK) | 000
M Sodikov (UZB) | 000
M Jędrzejewski (POL) | 011 (yellow card)
M Lakos (HUN) | 000 (yellow card)
A Sibișan (ROU) | 020 (yellow card)
M Bezděk (CZE) | 000
V Ghimbovschi (MDA) | 001
L Vissers (NED) | 000
D Poltushev (KGZ) | 100 (yellow card)

Quarter-finals
N Miki (JPN) | 000 (yellow card)
N Kharazishvili (GEO) | 100 (yellow card)
K Kappelmeier (GER) | 101
B Baitas (KAZ) | 000
M Jędrzejewski (POL) | 010
A Sibișan (ROU) | 001 (yellow card)
V Ghimbovschi (MDA) | 010
D Poltushev (KGZ) | 000

Semi-finals
N Kharazishvili (GEO) | 100
K Kappelmeier (GER) | 000
M Jędrzejewski (POL) | 010
V Ghimbovschi (MDA) | 000 (yellow card)

Final
N Kharazishvili (GEO) | 001
M Jędrzejewski (POL) | 020 (yellow card)

Repechage Phases

Repechage
N Miki (JPN) | 100
B Baitas (KAZ) | 000
A Sibișan (ROU) | 020
D Poltushev (KGZ) | 000

Bronze medal
N Miki (JPN) | 001
V Ghimbovschi (MDA) | 000
A Sibișan (ROU) | 001
K Kappelmeier (GER) | 000
