= Taekwondo at the 2026 Asian Games – Men's 58 kg =

Taekwondo competition

Men's 58 kg at the 2026 Asian Games
- Venue: Toyohashi City General Gymnasium
- Date: 2 October 2026
- Competitors: 16 from 16 nations

Medalists
gold medal	Tamirlan Tleules	Kazakhstan
silver medal	Kurt Bryan Barbosa	Philippines
bronze medal	Jaafar Al-Daoud	Jordan
bronze medal	An Hyang-sik	South Korea

The men's 58 kilograms event at the 2026 Asian Games took place on 2 October 2026 at Toyohashi City General Gymnasium, Toyohashi, Japan.

Each bout consisted of up to three rounds, lasting two minutes apiece. The athlete who scored more points in each round was the winner of that round; the bout finished when one athlete had won two rounds (and thus the match).

Tamirlan Tleules from Kazakhstan won the gold medal.

== Schedule ==
All times are Japan Standard Time (UTC+09:00)

Date	Time	Event
Friday, 2 October 2026	13:30	Round of 16
Friday, 2 October 2026	13:30	Quarterfinals
Friday, 2 October 2026	17:10	Semifinals
Friday, 2 October 2026	17:10	Gold medal contest

== Results ==
Round of 16
Asadbek Samandarov (UZB)	4	0
Hidetaka Maeda (JPN)	5	16
Abdullah Al-Mushraf (KSA)	6	10
Kurt Bryan Barbosa (PHI)	14	12
Shahzaib Khan (PAK)	12	0	0
Nguyễn Hồng Trọng (VIE)	11	8	13
Jaafar Al-Daoud (JOR)	25	17
Alisher Asymbek Uulu (KGZ)	10	2
Loiqjoni Shuhratzod (TJK)	1	0
Abolfazl Zandi (IRI)	16	15
Tamirlan Tleules (KAZ)	18	13
Nibras Al-Tooqi (OMA)	6	2
Yondonjamtsyn Pürevdash (MGL)	2	2
Huang Kefen (CHN)	18	13
An Hyang-sik (KOR)	8	17
Sirawit Mahamad (THA)	7	2

Quarterfinals
Hidetaka Maeda (JPN)	12	9	12
Kurt Bryan Barbosa (PHI)	12	9	13
Nguyễn Hồng Trọng (VIE)	10	2	4
Jaafar Al-Daoud (JOR)	2	2	4
Abolfazl Zandi (IRI)	2	11
Tamirlan Tleules (KAZ)	11	16
Huang Kefen (CHN)	2	10
An Hyang-sik (KOR)	6	16

Semifinals
Kurt Bryan Barbosa (PHI)	3	7
Jaafar Al-Daoud (JOR)	0	1
Tamirlan Tleules (KAZ)	4	0	5
An Hyang-sik (KOR)	4	2	5

Gold medal contest
Kurt Bryan Barbosa (PHI)	14	2
Tamirlan Tleules (KAZ)	16	15
