= Swimming at the 2025 Summer World University Games – Men's 100 metre breaststroke =

Men's 100 metre breaststroke at the 2025 Summer World University Games
- Venue: Schwimm- und Sprunghalle im Europasportpark
- Location: Berlin
- Dates: 17 July (heats and semifinals); 18 July (final)
- Competitors: 56 from 38 nations

Medalists
gold medal	Denis Petrashov	Kyrgyzstan
silver medal	Dawid Wiekiera	Poland
bronze medal	Benjamin Delmar	United States

The men's 100 metre breaststroke at the 2025 Summer World University Games in Rhine-Ruhr, Germany was held from 17 to 18 July 2025. Denis Petrashov from Kyrgyzstan won the gold medal, Dawid Wiekiera from Poland took the silver medal and Benjamin Delmar from the United States earned the bronze medal.

== Schedule ==
All times are Central European Time (UTC+1)

Date	Time	Round
17 July	10:23	Heats
17 July	19:38	Semifinals
18 July	20:14	Final

== Records ==
Prior to the competition, the world and Universiade records were as follows.

Category	Swimmer	Record	Date	Place	Event
World record	(United States) Adam Peaty	56.88	21 July 2019	Gwangju, South Korea	2019 World Championships
Universiade record	(China) Qin Haiyang	58.42	1 August 2023	Chengdu, China	2021 Summer World University Games

== Results ==
=== Heats ===
All entered athletes competed across multiple seeded heats in the morning session. Swimmers with the top 16 fastest times advanced, regardless of which individual heat they swam.

Rank	Heat	Lane	Swimmer	Nation	Time	Notes
1	8	3	Alessandro Fusco	Italy	59.95	Q
2	6	4	Nathaniel Germonprez	United States	1:00.45	Q
3	8	4	Denis Petrashov	Kyrgyzstan	1:00.63	Q
4	8	5	Dawid Wiekiera	Poland	1:00.65	Q
5	7	6	Benjamin Delmar	United States	1:00.72	Q
6	8	6	Adam Mak	Hong Kong	1:00.80	Q
7	6	5	Archie Goodburn	Great Britain	1:01.01	Q
8	7	5	Carl Aït Kaci	France	1:01.10	Q
9	6	2	Ivo Kroes	Netherlands	1:01.13	Q
10	7	4	Reo Okura	Japan	1:01.15	Q
11	6	3	Flavio Mangiameli	Italy	1:01.20	Q
11	8	7	Jeremias Pock	Germany	1:01.20	Q
13	7	3	Aibat Myrzamuratov	Kazakhstan	1:01.22	Q
14	7	2	Nicholas Cheung	Hong Kong	1:01.29	Q
15	6	7	Matěj Zábojník	Czech Republic	1:01.49	Q
16	4	7	Christopher Palvadre	Estonia	1:01.50	Q
17	5	4	Park Geon	South Korea	1:01.62	
18	7	8	Matthew Randle	South Africa	1:01.70	
19	6	8	Yuma Yoshida	Japan	1:01.72	
20	7	1	Henrique Fonseca	Brazil	1:02.01	
21	3	2	Vidith Shankar	India	1:02.02	
22	8	1	Vinicius Assunção	Brazil	1:02.09	
23	5	6	Kristaps Miķelsons	Latvia	1:02.16	
24	5	3	Christian Ryan	Great Britain	1:02.22	
25	8	2	Artur Mironov	Kazakhstan	1:02.31	
26	5	8	Liu Ching-hung	Chinese Taipei	1:02.38	
27	6	6	Brayden Taivassalo	Canada	1:02.43	
28	5	1	Linus Forsgren	Sweden	1:02.54	
29	7	7	Andrew Goh	Malaysia	1:02.63	
30	4	4	Jaš Berložnik	Slovenia	1:02.76	
31	5	2	Maël Allegrini	Switzerland	1:02.84	
32	6	1	Finn Kemp	Luxembourg	1:02.97	
33	3	1	Lasha Mindiashvili	Georgia	1:03.39	
34	5	5	Denis Șveț	Moldova	1:03.91	
35	4	1	Aleksandre Eradze	Georgia	1:04.13	
36	5	7	Panayiotis Panaretos	Cyprus	1:04.24	
37	3	5	Artjom Alteberg	Estonia	1:04.40	
38	3	6	Said Hamidov	Azerbaijan	1:04.67	
39	4	3	Erik Hrovat	Slovenia	1:04.73	
40	4	2	Iskandar Sadullaev	Uzbekistan	1:04.96	
41	3	4	Yadesh Mandey	India	1:05.19	
42	4	8	Nicholas Cheong	Singapore	1:05.23	
43	4	5	Ashot Chakhoyan	Armenia	1:05.62	
44	3	3	Roman Berkovich	Uzbekistan	1:05.89	
45	3	7	Rihards Kahanovičs	Latvia	1:06.37	
46	2	5	Derek Velasco	Ecuador	1:08.07	
47	2	3	Daniel Caicedo	Ecuador	1:10.53	
48	3	8	Gunbilig Tsevegsguren	Mongolia	1:10.75	
49	2	2	Chris Wijayalath	Sri Lanka	1:12.28	
50	1	3	Enzo Macedo	Argentina	1:12.71	
51	1	4	Namanya Ampaire	Uganda	1:13.34	
52	2	6	Gianluca Bertotto	Argentina	1:13.63	
53	2	4	John Kimuli	Uganda	1:15.38	
54	1	5	Khangal Bayartsengel	Mongolia	1:20.47	
—	8	8	Michael Houlie	South Africa	DNS	
—	4	6	Phillip Osadský	Slovakia	DSQ	

=== Semifinals ===
The 16 advancing swimmers were split into two semifinal heats of 8 during the evening session. The swimmers recording the top 8 fastest times advanced to the final round.

Rank	Heat	Lane	Swimmer	Nation	Time	Notes
1	1	5	Dawid Wiekiera	Poland	59.88	Q
2	1	4	Nathaniel Germonprez	United States	59.96	Q
3	2	3	Benjamin Delmar	United States	1:00.07	Q
4	2	4	Alessandro Fusco	Italy	1:00.20	Q
5	2	5	Denis Petrashov	Kyrgyzstan	1:00.27	Q
6	1	6	Carl Aït Kaci	France	1:00.47	Q
7	1	1	Nicholas Cheung	Hong Kong	1:00.50	Q
8	2	2	Ivo Kroes	Netherlands	1:00.53	Q
9	1	3	Adam Mak	Hong Kong	1:00.57	
10	1	8	Christopher Palvadre	Estonia	1:00.98	
10	1	2	Reo Okura	Japan	1:00.98	
12	2	6	Archie Goodburn	Great Britain	1:01.13	
13	2	1	Aibat Myrzamuratov	Kazakhstan	1:01.34	
14	1	7	Jeremias Pock	Germany	1:01.36	
15	2	8	Matěj Zábojník	Czech Republic	1:01.43	
16	2	7	Flavio Mangiameli	Italy	1:01.46	

=== Final ===
The fastest 8 swimmers competed in a single race to determine the gold, silver and bronze medalists.

Rank	Lane	Swimmer	Nation	Time	Notes
1st place, gold medalist(s)	2	Denis Petrashov	Kyrgyzstan	59.32	
2nd place, silver medalist(s)	4	Dawid Wiekiera	Poland	59.66	
3rd place, bronze medalist(s)	3	Benjamin Delmar	United States	59.80	
4	5	Nathaniel Germonprez	United States	59.95	
5	6	Alessandro Fusco	Italy	1:00.39	
6	1	Nicholas Cheung	Hong Kong	1:00.51	
7	8	Ivo Kroes	Netherlands	1:00.77	
8	7	Carl Aït Kaci	France	1:01.05	
