= 2025 World Taekwondo Championships – Men's flyweight =

Taekwondo competitions

Men's flyweight at the 2025 World Championships
- Venue: Taihu International Expo Center
- Dates: 29 October 2025
- Competitors: 68 from 66 nations

Medalists
gold medal	Abolfazl Zandi	Iran
silver medal	Georgii Gurtsiev	Individual Neutral Athletes
bronze medal	Huang Kefen	China
bronze medal	Gashim Magomedov	Azerbaijan

The men's flyweight competition at the 2025 World Taekwondo Championships was held on 29 October 2025 in Taihu International Expo Cente, Wuxi, China.

Flyweights were limited to a maximum of 58 kilograms in body mass. Abolfazl Zandi from Iran won the gold medal without losing a single round.

== Results ==
Legend

- P — Won by punitive declaration

=== Finals ===
Quarterfinals
Maksym Manenkov (UKR)	2	1
Abolfazl Zandi (IRI)	15	14
Paulo Melo (BRA)	0	0
Huang Kefen (CHN)	7	0
Nouridine Issaka (NIG)	2	13
Georgii Gurtsiev (AIN)	5	18
Gashim Magomedov (AZE)	10	8	14
Yusuf Badem (TUR)	7	12	11

Semifinals
Abolfazl Zandi (IRI)	6	12
Huang Kefen (CHN)	5	9
Georgii Gurtsiev (AIN)	2	8	14
Gashim Magomedov (AZE)	3	6	6

Final
Abolfazl Zandi (IRI)	7	12
Georgii Gurtsiev (AIN)	3	8

=== Top half ===
==== Section 1 ====
Round of 128
Iván Ríos (PAN)	12	8	0
Maxwell Manson (SLE)	9	17^{P}	13

Round of 64
Maksym Manenkov (UKR)	12	14
Maxwell Manson (SLE)	2	0
Josip Teskera (CRO)	7	5
Idar Bagov (AIN)	7	7
Konstantinos Dimitropoulos (GRE)	4	8
Aidin Altybaev (KGZ)	2	5
Wong Si Long (MAC)	2	0
Domen Molj (SLO)	13	12

Round of 32
Maksym Manenkov (UKR)	1	5	6
Idar Bagov (AIN)	17	5	6
Konstantinos Dimitropoulos (GRE)	5	7	10
Domen Molj (SLO)	6	2	7

Round of 16
Maksym Manenkov (UKR)	5	7	6
Konstantinos Dimitropoulos (GRE)	2	10	5

==== Section 2 ====
Round of 128

Round of 64
Casimir Betel (CHA)	6	11
Clement Onggosanusi (VAN)	2	0
William Cunningham (USA)	7	0
Jesús Fraile (ESP)	9	13
Abolfazl Zandi (IRI)	13	20
Bleron Ademi (KOS)	0	7
Achraf El-Mbarki (MAR)	0	2
Vito Dell'Aquila (ITA)	12	14

Round of 32
Casimir Betel (CHA)	3	2
Jesús Fraile (ESP)	7	4
Abolfazl Zandi (IRI)	10	5
Vito Dell'Aquila (ITA)	8	5

Round of 16
Jesús Fraile (ESP)	1	2
Abolfazl Zandi (IRI)	14	7

==== Section 3 ====
Round of 128

Round of 64
Nicholas Hoefling (CAN)	15	12
Jonathan Bouassa (CGO)	2	0
Noureddine Triki (TUN)	11	7
Benjamin Camua (AUS)	6	6
Mahmoud Yousif (JOR)	13	5
Gantulgyn Enkhbayar (MGL)	4	2
Kyriakos Andronikou (CYP)	0	5
Paulo Melo (BRA)	13	15

Round of 32
Nicholas Hoefling (CAN)	7	9
Noureddine Triki (TUN)	0	0
Mahmoud Yousif (JOR)	1	6
Paulo Melo (BRA)	6	9

Round of 16
Nicholas Hoefling (CAN)	6	3
Paulo Melo (BRA)	7	13

==== Section 4 ====
Round of 128
Jogi Katende (UGA)	2	6	3
Abdullah Al-Mushraf (KSA)	14	6	16

Round of 64
Milan Molle (NED)	18	9
Ali Burehma (KUW)	10	2
Jefferson Ochoa (COL)	0	8	6
Sirawit Mahamad (THA)	9	5	14
Sharif Salim (HUN)	8	6	5
Raphael Koudsi (LBN)	7	10	17
Abdullah Al-Mushraf (KSA)	2	5
Huang Kefen (CHN)	8	8

Round of 32
Milan Molle (NED)	5	4
Sirawit Mahamad (THA)	14	15
Raphael Koudsi (LBN)	2	0
Huang Kefen (CHN)	7	8

Round of 16
Sirawit Mahamad (THA)	2	2
Huang Kefen (CHN)	8	14

=== Bottom half ===
==== Section 5 ====
Round of 128
Thérence Biloghe (GAB)	7	18	14
Lukkee Sengmanee (LAO)	19	6	2

Round of 64
Bae Jun-seo (KOR)	16	11^{P}
Thérence Biloghe (GAB)	4	3
Nouridine Issaka (NIG)	13	11
Carlos Cortés (MEX)	1	4
Youssouf Simpara (MLI)	7	17
Đinh Công Khoa (VIE)	6	4
Aljen Aynaga (PHI)	10	13	7
Tamirlan Tleules (KAZ)	12	11	6

Round of 32
Bae Jun-seo (KOR)	5	14	16
Nouridine Issaka (NIG)	15	12	16
Youssouf Simpara (MLI)	4	8
Aljen Aynaga (PHI)	8	20

Round of 16
Nouridine Issaka (NIG)	4	5
Aljen Aynaga (PHI)	3	4

==== Section 6 ====
Round of 128

Round of 64
Pan Kuei-an (TPE)	12	16
Federico Amati (SMR)	0	5
Tiago Lopes (POR)	0	0
Aarón Contreras (CHI)	8	8
Vitali Geladze (GEO)	8	3
Ori Patishi (ISR)	0	1
Sumit Bist (NEP)	2	2
Georgii Gurtsiev (AIN)	11	9

Round of 32
Pan Kuei-an (TPE)	6	1	6
Aarón Contreras (CHI)	2	7	2
Vitali Geladze (GEO)	4	6	0
Georgii Gurtsiev (AIN)	10	4	1

Round of 16
Pan Kuei-an (TPE)	11	6	4
Georgii Gurtsiev (AIN)	13	5	7

==== Section 7 ====
Round of 128

Round of 64
Gashim Magomedov (AZE)	3	2
Abdul Wahid (IND)	2	0
Tristan Scutaru (ROU)	2	7
Omonjon Otajonov (UZB)	11	8
Mohamed Osama (EGY)	9	8
Mouhamadou Gueye (SEN)	0	3
Moktar Youssouf (DJI)	2	2
Lev Korneev (SRB)	17	15

Round of 32
Gashim Magomedov (AZE)	7	2
Omonjon Otajonov (UZB)	5	1
Mohamed Osama (EGY)	5	9	4
Lev Korneev (SRB)	10	4	5

Round of 16
Gashim Magomedov (AZE)	6	5	8
Lev Korneev (SRB)	5	13	2

==== Section 8 ====
Round of 128
Osamah Amtawaa (LBA)	7	4	10
Lokadevan Anatore (MAS)	3	4	9

Round of 64
Chiok Chun Yin (HKG)	7	11
Gregory Jean-Baptiste (HAI)	6	5
Noah Smith (NZL)	0	0
Feyyaz Gümüs (GER)	13	13
Amine Boukarnia (FRA)	5	8	7
Zack Sarsoza (GBR)	7	5	6
Osama Amtawaa (LBA)	9	3
Yusuf Badem (TUR)	13	16

Round of 32
Chiok Chun Yin (HKG)	0	3	3
Feyyaz Gümüs (GER)	12	2	5
Amine Boukarnia (FRA)	5	3
Yusuf Badem (TUR)	11	15

Round of 16
Feyyaz Gümüs (GER)	12	0
Yusuf Badem (TUR)	13	12
