= Taekwondo at the 2025 Summer World University Games =

International taekwondo competition

- Venue: Messe Essen
- Dates: 17–23 July 2025
- Competitors: 441 from 70 nations

Taekwondo took place at the 2025 Summer World University Games from 17 to 23 July 2025 at the Messe Essen in Essen, Germany.

== Medal table ==
* Host nation (Germany)

Rank	Nation	Gold	Silver	Bronze	Total
1	South Korea	7	4	3	14
2	China	4	2	3	9
3	Turkey	2	2	0	4
4	Ukraine	2	0	2	4
5	Chinese Taipei	1	4	2	7
6	Thailand	1	2	3	6
7	United States	1	1	5	7
8	Uzbekistan	1	1	4	6
9	Brazil	1	1	2	4
10	Kazakhstan	1	0	7	8
11	Canada	1	0	2	3
12	Denmark	1	0	0	1
12	Georgia	1	0	0	1
14	Germany*	0	1	2	3
14	Poland	0	1	2	3
14	Tunisia	0	1	2	3
17	Spain	0	1	1	2
18	Belgium	0	1	0	1
18	Czech Republic	0	1	0	1
18	Egypt	0	1	0	1
21	Croatia	0	0	2	2
22	France	0	0	1	1
22	Great Britain	0	0	1	1
22	Italy	0	0	1	1
22	Kyrgyzstan	0	0	1	1
22	Mexico	0	0	1	1
22	Norway	0	0	1	1
Totals (27 entries)		24	24	48	96

== Medal summary ==
=== Men ===
Event	Gold	Silver	Bronze
–54 kg (finweight)	Nithan Brindamohan; Canada	Ethan Gun; United States	Nurkhan Samidinov; Kyrgyzstan
–54 kg (finweight)	Nithan Brindamohan; Canada	Ethan Gun; United States	Matheus Gilliard; Brazil
–58 kg (flyweight)	Maksym Manenkov; Ukraine	Sirawit Mahamad; Thailand	Tamirlan Tleules; Kazakhstan
–58 kg (flyweight)	Maksym Manenkov; Ukraine	Sirawit Mahamad; Thailand	Shamsiddin Kurbonov; Uzbekistan
–63 kg (bantamweight)	Samirkhon Ababakirov; Kazakhstan	Ömer Faruk Dayıoğlu; Turkey	Mohamed Khalil Jendoubi; Tunisia
–63 kg (bantamweight)	Samirkhon Ababakirov; Kazakhstan	Ömer Faruk Dayıoğlu; Turkey	Kristian Borgen; Norway
–68 kg (featherweight)	Banlung Tubtimdang; Thailand	Liang Yushuai; China	Damir Shulenov; Kazakhstan
–68 kg (featherweight)	Banlung Tubtimdang; Thailand	Liang Yushuai; China	Matthew Howell; Great Britain
–74 kg (lightweight)	Zurab Kintsurashvili; Georgia	Vinícius Matos; Brazil	Chiu Yi-jui; Chinese Taipei
–74 kg (lightweight)	Zurab Kintsurashvili; Georgia	Vinícius Matos; Brazil	Najmiddin Kosimkhojiev; Uzbekistan
–80 kg (welterweight)	Seo Geon-woo; South Korea	Hung Jiun-yi; Chinese Taipei	Kyrylo Hurnov; Ukraine
–80 kg (welterweight)	Seo Geon-woo; South Korea	Hung Jiun-yi; Chinese Taipei	Batyrkhan Toleugali; Kazakhstan
–87 kg (middleweight)	Artem Harbar; Ukraine	Szymon Piątkowski; Poland	Michael Rodriguez; United States
–87 kg (middleweight)	Artem Harbar; Ukraine	Szymon Piątkowski; Poland	Vito Krpan; Croatia
+87 kg (heavyweight)	Kang Sang-hyun; South Korea	Marat Mavlonov; Uzbekistan	Andrii Harbar; Ukraine
+87 kg (heavyweight)	Kang Sang-hyun; South Korea	Marat Mavlonov; Uzbekistan	Beibarys Kablan; Kazakhstan
Individual Poomsae	Oh Min-hyeok; South Korea	Muhammed Emir Yılmaz; Turkey	Tomás Fernández Herrerín; Spain
Individual Poomsae	Oh Min-hyeok; South Korea	Muhammed Emir Yılmaz; Turkey	Sunghyun Eric Gun; United States
Team Poomsae	South Korea; Cho Ho-yeon; Shin Jin-ho; Kim Chan-ho	China; Yang Lei; Liu Siyue; Wu Weikang	Chinese Taipei; Huang Yi-cheng; Chen Hsiao-tse; Ke Hsiang-shuo
Team Poomsae	South Korea; Cho Ho-yeon; Shin Jin-ho; Kim Chan-ho	China; Yang Lei; Liu Siyue; Wu Weikang	Canada; Gordon Cheuk; Ethan Lok-yee; Chang Kai-hsin
Team Kyorugi	South Korea; Kang Sang-hyun; Kim Hyo-hyeok; Seo Geon-woo	Chinese Taipei; Jung Jiun-jie; Huang Cho-cheng; Hung Jiun-yi	Uzbekistan; Umidjon Turabov; Marat Mavlonov; Shokhijakhon Akhmedov
Team Kyorugi	South Korea; Kang Sang-hyun; Kim Hyo-hyeok; Seo Geon-woo	Chinese Taipei; Jung Jiun-jie; Huang Cho-cheng; Hung Jiun-yi	France; Nahil Mehnana; Bassem Amri; Théo Lucien

=== Women's events ===
Event	Gold	Silver	Bronze
–46 kg (finweight)	Kim Yun-seo; South Korea	Huang Ying-hsuan; Chinese Taipei	Luo Miaoyi; China
–46 kg (finweight)	Kim Yun-seo; South Korea	Huang Ying-hsuan; Chinese Taipei	Elisa Bertagnin; Italy
–49 kg (flyweight)	Ma Jingyue; China	Supharada Kisskalt; Germany	Nodira Akhmedova; Kazakhstan
–49 kg (flyweight)	Ma Jingyue; China	Supharada Kisskalt; Germany	Kamonchanok Seeken; Thailand
–53 kg (bantamweight)	Guo Qing; China	Chutikan Jongkolrattanawattana; Thailand	Ouhoud Ben Aoun; Tunisia
–53 kg (bantamweight)	Guo Qing; China	Chutikan Jongkolrattanawattana; Thailand	Seo Yeo-won; South Korea
–57 kg (featherweight)	Maria Clara Pacheco; Brazil	Chaima Toumi; Tunisia	Nikol Lisowska; Poland
–57 kg (featherweight)	Maria Clara Pacheco; Brazil	Chaima Toumi; Tunisia	Madina Mirabzalova; Uzbekistan
–62 kg (lightweight)	Şevval Çakal; Turkey	Petra Štolbová; Czech Republic	Ivana Arelić; Croatia
–62 kg (lightweight)	Şevval Çakal; Turkey	Petra Štolbová; Czech Republic	Sasikarn Tongchan; Thailand
–67 kg (welterweight)	Jiani Xing; China	Lena Moreno Reyes; Spain	Kwak Min-ju; South Korea
–67 kg (welterweight)	Jiani Xing; China	Lena Moreno Reyes; Spain	Leonarda Andric; Canada
–73 kg (middleweight)	Sude Yaren Uzunçavdar; Turkey	Sarah Chaâri; Belgium	Mikaella Oliveira dos Santos; Brazil
–73 kg (middleweight)	Sude Yaren Uzunçavdar; Turkey	Sarah Chaâri; Belgium	Oh Seung-ju; South Korea
+73 kg (heavyweight)	Song Da-bin; South Korea	Chin I-chun; Chinese Taipei	Dagmara Haremza; Poland
+73 kg (heavyweight)	Song Da-bin; South Korea	Chin I-chun; Chinese Taipei	Hannah Keck; United States
Individual Poomsae	Eva Sandersen; Denmark	Jung Ha-eun; South Korea	Kaitlyn Reclusado; United States
Individual Poomsae	Eva Sandersen; Denmark	Jung Ha-eun; South Korea	Pan Meijing; China
Team Poomsae	Chinese Taipei; Chen Hsin-ya; Yang Chang-ying; Kuo Yen-yu	South Korea; Ryu Tae-gyeong; Choi Ji-woo; Son Min-seon	United States; Kim Ga-hui; Lana Moraleda; Kaitlyn Reclusado
Team Poomsae	Chinese Taipei; Chen Hsin-ya; Yang Chang-ying; Kuo Yen-yu	South Korea; Ryu Tae-gyeong; Choi Ji-woo; Son Min-seon	Germany; Leah Lawall; Adina Machwirth; Anna Siepmann
Team Kyorugi	China; Xing Jiani; Mu Wenzhe; Guo Qing	South Korea; Kwak Min-ju; Seo Yeo-won; Song Da-bin	Kazakhstan; Mariya Sevostyanova; Nuray Khussainova; Aisha Adilbekkyzy
Team Kyorugi	China; Xing Jiani; Mu Wenzhe; Guo Qing	South Korea; Kwak Min-ju; Seo Yeo-won; Song Da-bin	Thailand; Sasikarn Tongchan; Orawan Ratsameprapa; Piyachutrutai Chareewan

=== Mixed events ===
Event	Gold	Silver	Bronze
Team Poomsae	United States; Sunghyun Eric Gun; Kaitlyn Reclusado	South Korea; Kang Min-jae; Han Da-hyun	Mexico; William Arroyo; Marisa Arellano
Team Poomsae	United States; Sunghyun Eric Gun; Kaitlyn Reclusado	South Korea; Kang Min-jae; Han Da-hyun	China; Wu Weikang; Pan Meijing
Team Kyorugi	Uzbekistan; Diyorakhon Azizova; Shokhjakhon Karimboev; Najmiddin Kosimkhojiev; Madina Mirabzalova	Egypt; Abdallah Hassan; Nadine Mahmoud; Yahia Mohamed; Aya Shehata	Kazakhstan; Nazym Makhmutova; Samirkhon Ababakirov; Beibarys Kablan; Aidana Sundetbay
Team Kyorugi	Uzbekistan; Diyorakhon Azizova; Shokhjakhon Karimboev; Najmiddin Kosimkhojiev; Madina Mirabzalova	Egypt; Abdallah Hassan; Nadine Mahmoud; Yahia Mohamed; Aya Shehata	Germany; Supharada Kisskalt; Laura Göbel; Kaan Gümüş; Jona Pörsch

== Participant NUSFs ==
1. Albania (4)
2. Armenia (6)
3. Australia (12)
4. Austria (1)
5. Azerbaijan (10)
6. Belgium (1)
7. Bosnia and Herzegovina (5)
8. Brazil (7)
9. Bulgaria (3)
10. Cambodia (5)
11. Canada (16)
12. Chile (1)
13. Croatia (6)
14. Cyprus (2)
15. Czech Republic (2)
16. Denmark (5)
17. Ecuador (16)
18. Egypt (7)
19. Estonia (2)
20. Ethiopia (2)
21. Finland (2)
22. France (12)
23. The Gambia (1)
24. Georgia (2)
25. Germany (18)
26. Guyana (1)
27. Haiti (1)
28. Hong Kong (9)
29. Hungary (2)
30. India (24)
31. Individual Neutral Athletes (3)
32. Ireland (2)
33. Israel (8)
34. Italy (11)
35. Japan (8)
36. Kazakhstan (13)
37. Kenya (4)
38. South Korea (20)
39. Kosovo (2)
40. Kyrgyzstan (3)
41. Latvia (1)
42. Lebanon (8)
43. Macau (2)
44. Malaysia (9)
45. Mali (2)
46. Mexico (11)
47. Mongolia (7)
48. Nepal (5)
49. Netherlands (3)
50. New Zealand (3)
51. Nigeria (4)
52. Norway (3)
53. Oman (4)
54. Pakistan (5)
55. China (12)
56. Poland (14)
57. Portugal (4)
58. Qatar (1)
59. Romania (8)
60. Singapore (6)
61. Slovenia (2)
62. Slovakia (1)
63. Spain (13)
64. Sweden (1)
65. Thailand (13)
66. Tunisia (3)
67. Turkey (18)
68. Ukraine (21)
69. United States (19)
70. Uzbekistan (14)
