= Asian Refugee Team at the 2026 Asian Games =

- IOC code: ART

in Aichi Prefecture and Nagoya, Japan 19 September 2026 – 4 October 2026
- Competitors: 2 (1 man and 1 woman) in 1 sport
- Flag bearers: Mahmoud Jasem Muhammad; Tala Hasan Hunaidi
- Medals: Gold 0 Silver 0 Bronze 0 Total 0

Asian Games appearances
- 2026

The Asian Refugee Team, also known as the OCA Refugee Team, competed at the 2026 Asian Games in Aichi Prefecture and Nagoya, Japan, from 19 September to 4 October 2026.

== Background ==
A refugee team debuted at the 2026 Asian Games for the very first time. The team had two designations: "OCA Refugee Team" for protocol-related purposes such as in the opening and closing ceremonies and "Asian Refugee Team" for competition purposes. The delegation was given the code "ART".

In an event an Asian Refugee Team athlete wins a medal, the flag and anthem of the Olympic Council of Asia would have been used.

The delegation consists of two taekwondo athletes: Mahmoud Jasem Muhammad and Tala Hasan Hunaidi. They are Syrian refugees who have lived in the Azraq refugee camp in Jordan. The two athletes were in attendance during the opening ceremony and served as flagbearers.

== Taekwondo ==
Two athletes from the Asian Refugee Team competed in taekwondo. Both athletes were eliminated in the Round of 16 by their respective opponents.

=== Kyorugi ===
| Athlete | Event | Round of 16 | Quarterfinal | Semifinal | Final | |
| Athlete | Event | Opposition score | Opposition score | Opposition score | Opposition score | Rank |
|---|---|---|---|---|---|---|
| Mahmoud Jasem Muhammad | Men's 80 kg | Kang (KOR); L 0–2 | Did not advance | | | |
| Tala Hasan Hunaidi | Women's –49 kg | Ma (CHN); L 0–2 | Did not advance | | | |

== See also ==
- Refugee Team at the 2017 Asian Indoor and Martial Arts Games
