= Tunisia at the 2025 Summer World University Games =

- Flag of Tunisia
- IOC code: TUN
- National federation: Fédération Tunisienne des Sports Scolaires & Universitaires

in Rhine-Ruhr, Germany 16 July 2025 – 27 July 2025
- Competitors: 3 in 1 sport
- Medals Ranked 46th: Gold 0 Silver 1 Bronze 2 Total 3

Summer World University Games appearances
- 1959; 1961; 1963; 1965; 1967; 1970; 1973; 1975; 1977; 1979; 1981; 1983; 1985; 1987; 1989; 1991; 1993; 1995; 1997; 1999; 2001; 2003; 2005; 2007; 2009; 2011; 2013; 2015; 2017; 2019; 2021; 2025; 2027

Tunisia competed at the 2025 Summer World University Games in Rhine-Ruhr, Germany held from 16 to 27 July 2025. Tunisia was represented by 3 athletes and took forty-sixth place in the medal table with three medals.

== Medal summary ==
=== Medal by sports ===
Rank	Sports	Gold	Silver	Bronze	Total
1	Taekwondo	0	1	2	3
Totals (1 entries)		0	1	2	3

Source: rhineruhr2025.com

=== Medalists ===
Medal	Name	Sport	Event	Date
Silver	Chaima Toumi	Taekwondo	Women -57kg	19 July
Bronze	Ouhoud Ben Aoun	Taekwondo	Women -53kg	22 July
Bronze	Mohamed Khalil Jendoubi	Taekwondo	Men -63kg	22 July
