= 2022 World Taekwondo Junior Championships =

- Venue: Armeets Arena
- Location: Bulgaria Sofia
- Dates: 2–7 August

Champion
- South Korea
- Men: South Korea
- Women: South Korea

The 2022 World Taekwondo Junior Championships, the 13th edition of the World Taekwondo Junior Championships, was held in Sofia, Bulgaria from 2 to 7 August 2022.

== Medal table ==
* Host nation (Bulgaria)

Rank	Nation	Gold	Silver	Bronze	Total
1	South Korea	10	2	2	14
2	Iran	6	2	0	8
3	Thailand	1	3	2	6
4	Turkey	1	2	0	3
5	Italy	1	0	3	4
6	Belgium	1	0	0	1
7	Kazakhstan	0	2	4	6
8	Uzbekistan	0	2	2	4
9	Chinese Taipei	0	1	3	4
10	Greece	0	1	2	3
11	Great Britain	0	1	1	2
11	Serbia	0	1	1	2
13	France	0	1	0	1
13	Montenegro	0	1	0	1
13	United States	0	1	0	1
16	Croatia	0	0	3	3
16	Ukraine	0	0	3	3
18	Sweden	0	0	2	2
19	Australia	0	0	1	1
19	Brazil	0	0	1	1
19	Canada	0	0	1	1
19	Egypt	0	0	1	1
19	Japan	0	0	1	1
19	Mexico	0	0	1	1
19	Morocco	0	0	1	1
19	Niger	0	0	1	1
19	Norway	0	0	1	1
19	Palestine	0	0	1	1
19	Spain	0	0	1	1
19	Tunisia	0	0	1	1
Totals (30 entries)		20	20	40	80

== Medal summary ==
=== Men ===
Event	Gold	Silver	Bronze
−45 kg	Yeonui Choo; South Korea	Yi-Chi Li; Chinese Taipei	Maksym Manenkov; Ukraine
−45 kg	Yeonui Choo; South Korea	Yi-Chi Li; Chinese Taipei	Mohamed Amine Zoghlami; Tunisia
−48 kg	Abolfazl Zandi; Iran	Pornpawit Toruen; Thailand	Asset Izgaleyev; Kazakhstan
−48 kg	Abolfazl Zandi; Iran	Pornpawit Toruen; Thailand	Noah Nacsa; Canada
−51 kg	Huichan Yang; South Korea	Tamirlan Tleules; Kazakhstan	Ittiporn Sinsang; Thailand
−51 kg	Huichan Yang; South Korea	Tamirlan Tleules; Kazakhstan	Bleron Ademi; Sweden
−55 kg	Euijun Hong; South Korea	William Cunningham; United States	Zhavokhirkhon Islamov; Kazakhstan
−55 kg	Euijun Hong; South Korea	William Cunningham; United States	Nouridine Issaka; Niger
−59 kg	Woo-Hyeok Jung; South Korea	Banlung Tubtimdang; Thailand	Alibek Shaikenov; Kazakhstan
−59 kg	Woo-Hyeok Jung; South Korea	Banlung Tubtimdang; Thailand	Omar Yaser Ismail; Palestine
−63 kg	Matin Rezaei; Iran	Nazarali Nazarov; Uzbekistan	Rafael Pappa; Greece
−63 kg	Matin Rezaei; Iran	Nazarali Nazarov; Uzbekistan	Hyunwoo Seo; South Korea
−68 kg	Angelo Mangione; Italy	Zarko Krajisnik; Serbia	Matthew Summerfield; Australia
−68 kg	Angelo Mangione; Italy	Zarko Krajisnik; Serbia	Batyrkhan Toleugali; Kazakhstan
-73 kg	Reza Kalhor; Iran	Münir Furkan Doğru; Turkey	Haitam Zarhouti; Morocco
-73 kg	Reza Kalhor; Iran	Münir Furkan Doğru; Turkey	Oscar Kovacic; Croatia
-78 kg	Inhyuk Lee; South Korea	Mohamed Mendy; France	Muzaffar Sadriddinov; Uzbekistan
-78 kg	Inhyuk Lee; South Korea	Mohamed Mendy; France	Youssef Elsharkawy; Egypt
+78 kg	Abolfazl Abbasi; Iran	Kuk Hwan Lyu; South Korea	Bryan Erkmann Da Silva; Brazil
+78 kg	Abolfazl Abbasi; Iran	Kuk Hwan Lyu; South Korea	Sergio Troitino Amoedo; Spain

=== Women ===
Event	Gold	Silver	Bronze
−42 kg	Sogand Shiri; Iran	Hayrunnisa Gürbüz; Turkey	Se Yeon Jung; South Korea
−42 kg	Sogand Shiri; Iran	Hayrunnisa Gürbüz; Turkey	Gulshanoy Ismoilova; Uzbekistan
−44 kg	Natkamon Wassana; Thailand	Parnia Salmani; Iran	Giulia Galiero; Italy
−44 kg	Natkamon Wassana; Thailand	Parnia Salmani; Iran	Ching-Yun Huang; Chinese Taipei
−46 kg	Yunseo Kim; South Korea	Aidana Sundetbay; Kazakhstan	Ruka Okamoto; Japan
−46 kg	Yunseo Kim; South Korea	Aidana Sundetbay; Kazakhstan	Patcharakan Poolkerd; Thailand
−49 kg	Mobina Nematzadeh; Iran	Kamonchanok Seeken; Thailand	Yekateryna Khomenko; Ukraine
−49 kg	Mobina Nematzadeh; Iran	Kamonchanok Seeken; Thailand	Indra Boden; Sweden
−52 kg	Yeowon Seo; South Korea	Marjona Khudaykulova; Uzbekistan	Anna Cuorvo; Italy
−52 kg	Yeowon Seo; South Korea	Marjona Khudaykulova; Uzbekistan	Sara Spasojevic; Croatia
−55 kg	Gahyeon Kim; South Korea	Athanasia Repoulia; Greece	Nika Karabatic; Croatia
−55 kg	Gahyeon Kim; South Korea	Athanasia Repoulia; Greece	Amina Hammich; Norway
−59 kg	Hanna Lee; South Korea	Neve Mcphillie; Great Britain	Pei-Yu Yao; Chinese Taipei
−59 kg	Hanna Lee; South Korea	Neve Mcphillie; Great Britain	Anna Maria Kriatsioti; Greece
−63 kg	Sarah Chaari; Belgium	Saghar Moradi; Iran	Ela Maric; Serbia
−63 kg	Sarah Chaari; Belgium	Saghar Moradi; Iran	Uliana Kuts; Ukraine
−68 kg	Hyo Rim Hong; South Korea	Andela Berisaj; Montenegro	I Chun Chin; Chinese Taipei
−68 kg	Hyo Rim Hong; South Korea	Andela Berisaj; Montenegro	Giulia Maggiore; Italy
+68 kg	Sude Yaren Uzunçavdar; Turkey	Sugee Jung; South Korea	Renata Ahedo; Mexico
+68 kg	Sude Yaren Uzunçavdar; Turkey	Sugee Jung; South Korea	Morgan Curtis; Great Britain
