= Kamonchanok Seeken =

Thai taekwondo practitioner

Sport
- Country: Thailand
- Sport: Taekwondo
- Weight class: 46 kg, 49 kg
Medal record
Women's taekwondo
Representing Thailand
World Championships
Silver medal – second place	2023 Baku	46 kg
Asian Championships
Silver medal – second place	2024 Da Nang	46 kg
SEA Games
Silver medal – second place	2025 Thailand	49 kg
World University Games
Bronze medal – third place	2025 Rhine-Ruhr	49 kg

Kamonchanok Seeken (Thai: กมลชนก สีเคน; born 19 June 2006) is a taekwondo practitioner from Thailand. She was a silver medalist at the 2023 World Taekwondo Championships.

== Career ==
She started in taekwondo when she was three years-old. She started training with the Thai national team when she was 13 years-old. She won the silver medal at the 2022 World Taekwondo Junior Championships in the 49 kg category, in Sofia, Bulgaria in August 2022.

She won the silver medal in the Women's finweight at the 2023 World Taekwondo Championships in Baku as a 17 year-old. In July 2023, she won bronze at the Muju Taekwondowon 2023 World Taekwondo Grand Prix Challenge.

She was a silver medalist in the Finweight −46 kg category at the 2024 Asian Taekwondo Championships in Da Nang, Vietnam. In November 2024, she won her first championship in the 49 kg category in Zagreb, Croatia. That month, she was announced by Coach Che’, the Thai national taekwondo coach, to be competing at the 2025 World Championships, in place of two-time Olympic gold medalist Panipak Wongpattanakit.

She won the -49 kg division at the 2025 Dutch Open, and 2025 Belgian Open, in March 2025. Seeken was a bronze medalist in the flyweight division at the 2025 Summer World University Games in Germany. Seeken was a silver medalist at the 2025 SEA Games in December, losing to Tachiana Mangin of the Philippines in the 49 kg final.
