= Chutikan Jongkolrattanawattana =

Thai taekwondo practitioner (born 2003)

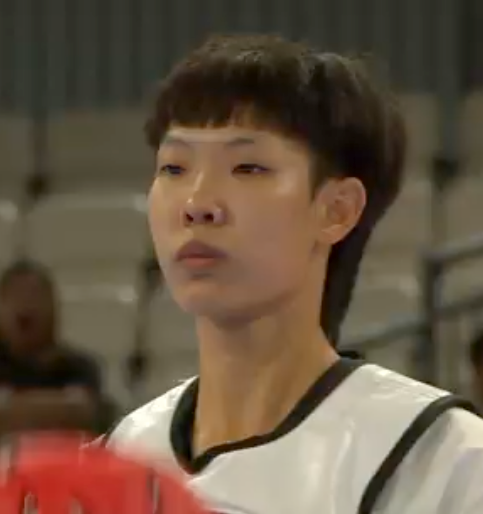
- At the 2025 Summer World University Games

Personal information
- Born: 10 January 2003 (age 23)

Sport
- Sport: Taekwondo
Medal record
Representing Thailand
Asian Games
Bronze medal – third place	2022 Hangzhou	49 kg
Asian Championships
Silver medal – second place	2024 Da Nang	49 kg
SEA Games
Gold medal – first place	2025 Thailand	53 kg
World University Games
Silver medal – second place	2025 Rhine-Ruhr	53 kg

Chutikan Jongkolrattanawattana (born 10 January 2003) is a Thai taekwondo practitioner. She won a bronze medal at the 2022 Asian Games, a silver medal at the 2024 Asian Taekwondo Championships and a gold medal at the 2025 SEA Games.

== Career ==
She started taekwondo at the age of nine years-old, following her brother who started in the sport. When she was 12 years-old she won a silver medal at the 2015 World Taekwondo Federation (WTF) World Cadet Championships in Muju County, South Korea.

She won a bronze medal in the -52kg division at the delayed 2022 Asian Games held in Hangzhou, China, in September 2023.

She was a silver medalist at the 2024 Asian Taekwondo Championships in Da Nang, Vietnam in May 2024.

She won a silver medal at the Games, defeated by Guo Qing of China in the final of the -53kg division. In December, she was a gold medalist at the 2025 SEA Games in Bangkok in the women's -53 kg category.
