= 2026 Asian Games opening ceremony =

- Date: 19 September 2026; 2 months ago
- Time: 18:00 – 20:00 JST (UTC+9)
- Location: Nagoya, Japan
- Theme: Harmonic Heart Beat

The 2026 Asian Games opening ceremony was held on 19 September 2026 at 18:00 to 20:00 JST (UTC+09:00) at Paloma Mizuho Stadium.

== Background ==
Japanese filmmaker Yukihiko Tsutsumi was appointed as the creative director of the ceremonies. The opening ceremonies' theme was "Harmonic Heart Beat", with the stage being in the shape of a heart. According to Tsutsumi, the heart motif symbolizes "the spirit of warm hospitality" that defines the hosts Nagoya and Aichi. It is also meant to represent the connection between Asian countries. The stage, cauldron, as well as the planning, production and operation of the opening and closing ceremonies were done by the Chinese firm Dafeng Industry.

Tickets were reportedly sold out. Although there were conflicting reports that 70% of the tickets were sold and that there were "thousands" of vacant seats during the event. It was noted that a row of seats had to be left empty for the placement of the cauldron.

Emperor Naruhito officially declared the Games open. Father-and-son hammer throwers Shigenobu and Koji Murofushi lit the cauldron.

== Proceedings ==
=== Pre-opening ceremony activities ===
Prior to the opening ceremony proper, activities were held on the opening day of the 2026 Asian Games, including a flyover by the Blue Impulse aerobatics squad.

The Warm-Up Stage event occurred at 16:00 (UTC+9), or two hours prior to the opening ceremony. It featured acts from INI, the Shigō District Bō-no-te Preservation Society, Takuichiro Kobayashi, and Rina Kato.

=== Welcome Aichi-Nagoya ===
The opening ceremony officially starged at 18:00 (UTC+9) at the 35,000-seat Paloma Mizuho Stadium.

In the opening segment "Welcome Aichi-Nagoya – Awakening of the Space and the Resonating Heart Beat", Japanese violinist Taro Hakase performing atop the heart-shaped central stage. Beneath him, 240 citizen dancers moved in coordination with Hakase's upbeat performance before eventually forming the word "Welcome."

Flag of Japan being raised at the stadium.

The flag of Japan was raised with the Keiko Toda leading the singing of Kimigayo, the national anthem of Japan.

=== Parade of Nations ===
The 2026 Asian Games Parade of Nations was part of the opening ceremony. The delegations of the games marched to the Paloma Mizuho Stadium in alphabetical order in English.

For the purposes of the parade, South Korea was designated as "Korea", while North Korea was listed as "DPR Korea." Taiwan which competes as "Chinese Taipei", is sorted under "T" and was slotted after Syria and before Tajikistan. The Asian Refugee Team, designated as the "OCA Refugee Team" during the ceremony, entered after Yemen and immediately before host nation Japan, which was the final delegation to enter.

Each team bore a placard with the delegation's English name on one side and its Japanese name on the other. In some cases, the two names were not exact translations of each other (for example, South Korea's placard read "Korea" in English, but the full name 大韓民国 (Republic of Korea) in Japanese instead of the short name 韓国). Also in some cases (for example China and Korea), the English announcer read out full names while the placards used short names.

Order	Nation	Official designation	Flag bearers	Sport	Ref.
1	Afghanistan				
2	Bahrain		Mustafa Hussain	Basketball	
2	Bahrain		Aneesa Mahmood	Equestrian	
3	Bangladesh		Abdullah Hel Baki	Shooting	
3	Bangladesh		Humaira Akter Antora	Karate	
4	Bhutan		Kinley Tshering	Archery	
4	Bhutan		Kinga Wangmo	Boxing	
5	Brunei	Brunei Darussalam	Mohammad Adi Salihin	Wushu	
6	Cambodia				
7	China		Hu Mingxuan	Basketball	
7	China		Wu Yu	Boxing	
8	North Korea	DPR Korea	Hwang Hyo-sun	Boxing	
8	North Korea	DPR Korea	Woo Tae-ryong	Table tennis	
9	Hong Kong	Hong Kong, China	Ivan Yang	Basketball	
9	Hong Kong	Hong Kong, China	Lydia Sham	Wushu	
10	India		Pawan Sehrawat	Kabaddi	
10	India		Manu Bhaker	Shooting	
11	Indonesia		Daniel Hutapea	Karate	
11	Indonesia		Dewa Ayu Made Sriartha	Basketball	
12	Iran	IR Iran	Zahra Kiani	Wushu	
12	Iran	IR Iran	Fazel Atrachali	Kabaddi	
13	Iraq				
14	Jordan		Abdelrahman Al-Masatfa	Karate	
14	Jordan		Jood Al-Dross	Karate	
15	Kazakhstan				
16	South Korea	Korea	Kim Dong-yong	Rowing	
16	South Korea	Korea	Shin Yu-bin	Table tennis	
17	Kuwait				
18	Kyrgyzstan				
19	Laos	Lao PDR	Phonh Saibounpheng	Wushu	
19	Laos	Lao PDR	Koy Xayavong	Sepak takraw	
20	Lebanon		Michael Yared	Modern pentathlon	
20	Lebanon		Maria Chedid	Teqball	
21	Macau	Macao, China			
22	Malaysia		Tan Cheong Min	Wushu	
22	Malaysia		Muhd Azeem Fahmi	Athletics	
23	Maldives		Moosa Munsif Ahmed	Table tennis	
23	Maldives		Mariyam Eshal Misbah	Shooting	
24	Mongolia				
25	Myanmar				
26	Nepal		Chandra Bahadur Thapa	Boxing	
26	Nepal		Manmati Bist	Kabaddi	
27	Oman				
28	Pakistan		Noor Zaman	Squash	
28	Pakistan		Fatima Sana	Cricket	
29	Palestine				
30	Philippines		Aira Villegas	Boxing	
30	Philippines		Albert Delos Santos	Weightlifting	
31	Qatar		Mohammed Saadon Al Kuwari	Padel	
31	Qatar		Reem Al Sharshani	Shooting	
32	Saudi Arabia		Khalifah Al-Omairi	Fencing	
32	Saudi Arabia		Yara Al-Omari	Boxing	
33	Singapore		Brandon Ooi	Canoeing	
33	Singapore		Kiria Tikanah	Fencing	
34	Sri Lanka		Isiwaruna De Silva	Modern pentathlon	
34	Sri Lanka		Nuyara Fernando	Gymnastics	
35	Syria				
36	Chinese Taipei		Huang Hsiao-wen	Boxing	
36	Chinese Taipei		Zhang Huan-yi	Wushu	
37	Tajikistan				
38	Thailand		Chalermcharn Yotviriyapanit	Equestrian	
38	Thailand		Thatdao Nuekjang	Volleyball	
39	Timor-Leste		Joel Savio Valente	Beach volleyball	
40	Turkmenistan				
41	United Arab Emirates		Al Hayam Saif Al Balooshi	Fencing	
41	United Arab Emirates		Faris Al Balooshi	Fencing	
42	Uzbekistan		Turabek Khabibullaev	Boxing	
42	Uzbekistan		Gulistan Perdebaeva	Fencing	
43	Vietnam		Lê Thanh Thúy	Volleyball	
43	Vietnam		Đinh Quang Kiệt	Football	
44	Yemen		Magd Aldhubhani	Table tennis	
44	Yemen		Yasameen Alraimi	Shooting	
45	Asian Refugee Team	OCA Refugee Team	Mahmoud Jasem Muhammad	Taekwondo	
45	Asian Refugee Team	OCA Refugee Team	Tala Hasan Hunaidi	Taekwondo	
46	Japan		Akari Fujinami	Wrestling	
46	Japan		Rim Nakamura	Cycling	

=== Post-parade activities ===
After the parade, Aichi–Nagoya Organizing Committee president Hideaki Ōmura and Olympic Council of Asia president Joaan bin Hamad Al Thani delivered their speeches. Emperor Naruhito declared the games open. The Olympic Council of Asia (OCA) flag was raised to the short version of its anthem. Yuri Tanaka and Ryoichi Akamatsu led the athletes' oath in Japanese language.

"In Aichi–Nagoya, the Heart Beat of Tradition", the development of the host localities were showcased with a mix of traditional and contemporary elements.

In "A Manufacturing Excellence in Aichi–Nagoya: Harmony Connecting to the Future", the performances featured the local manufacturing industry.

The torch relay which started on 22 August 2026, ended at the latter part of the 2026 Asian Games opening ceremony. Inside the stadium, the torch was relayed by wrestler Akari Fujinami, swimmer Kosuke Kitajima, sprinter Koji Ito, and badminton player Reika Takahashi. Takahashi passed the torch to father-and-son hammer throwers Shigenobu and Koji Murofushi who then jointly lit the cauldron, bringing the ceremony to a close.

== Officials and guests ==
=== Host country dignitaries ===
- Imperial House of Japan
  - Emperor Naruhito
  - Empress Masako
  - Crown Prince Fumihito
  - Crown Princess Kiko

Prime Minister Sanae Takaichi was expected to attend the event but did not, citing schedule conflicts.

=== International organizations ===
- (International Olympic Committee) President of the IOC Kirsty Coventry
- President of the OCA Joaan bin Hamad Al Thani
