= 2023 World Taekwondo Championships – Women's finweight =

Taekwondo competitions

Women's finweight at the 2023 World Championships
- Venue: Baku Crystal Hall
- Dates: 2 June 2023
- Competitors: 49 from 47 nations

Medalists
gold medal	Lena Stojković	Croatia
silver medal	Kamonchanok Seeken	Thailand
bronze medal	Ruka Okamoto	Japan
bronze medal	Wang Xiaolu	China

The women's finweight is a competition featured at the 2023 World Taekwondo Championships, and was held at the Baku Crystal Hall in Baku, Azerbaijan on 2 June 2023. Finweights were limited to a maximum of 46 kilograms in body mass.

== Results ==
Legend

- P — Won by punitive declaration

=== Finals ===
Semifinals			Final
Lena Stojković (CRO)	6	9
Ruka Okamoto (JPN)	4	0	Lena Stojković (CRO)	4	12	6
Kamonchanok Seeken (THA)	14	13	Kamonchanok Seeken (THA)	14	11	4
Wang Xiaolu (CHN)	3	5

=== Top half ===
==== Section 1 ====
Round of 64
Camila Llauca (PER)	1	1
Twisha Kakadiya (IND)	14	2
Sofia Zampetti (ITA)	12	11
Hanna Csáki (HUN)	0	6
Mönkhtögsiin Suvd-Erdene (MGL)	2	3
Rukiye Yıldırım (TUR)	8	12
Anita Kamińska (POL)	0	3
Juliet Lahood (AUS)	13	15
Sara Cortegoso (ESP)	9	17
Maiar Qabaha (PLE)	4	9

Round of 32
Lena Stojković (CRO)	13	15
Twisha Kakadiya (IND)	5	5
Sofia Zampetti (ITA)	3	20
Rukiye Yıldırım (TUR)	15	21
Laura Sancho (CRC)	1	7
Juliet Lahood (AUS)	6	13
Sara Cortegoso (ESP)	1	1
Rita Bakisheva (KAZ)	10	9

Round of 16
Lena Stojković (CRO)	13	16
Rukiye Yıldırım (TUR)	9	3
Juliet Lahood (AUS)	0	3
Rita Bakisheva (KAZ)	5	5

Quarterfinals
Lena Stojković (CRO)	3	9	8
Rita Bakisheva (KAZ)	4	3	7

==== Section 2 ====
Round of 64
Zukhrakhon Tojimatova (UZB)	10	10
Nezha El-Aasal (MAR)	9	7
Ni Kadek Heni Prikasih (INA)	11^{P}	9^{P}
Ingrid Busuioc (ROU)	0	0
Yunisha Rai (NEP)	1	5	7
Virginia Dellán (VEN)	2	2	7
Ruka Okamoto (JPN)	6	15
Sarai Sánchez (PUR)	3	4

Round of 32
Michelle Tau (LES)	6	3
Zukhrakhon Tojimatova (UZB)	13	6
Ni Kadek Heni Prikasih (INA)	4	7
Phoenix Goodman (GBR)	3	2
Karoline Castillo (PAN)	0	2
Virginia Dellán (VEN)	7	4
Ruka Okamoto (JPN)	0	8
Minaya Akbarova (AZE)	0	2

Round of 16
Zukhrakhon Tojimatova (UZB)	0	1
Ni Kadek Heni Prikasih (INA)	12	10
Virginia Dellán (VEN)	4	1
Ruka Okamoto (JPN)	9	13

Quarterfinals
Ni Kadek Heni Prikasih (INA)	6	5	6
Ruka Okamoto (JPN)	5	10	7

=== Bottom half ===
==== Section 3 ====
Round of 64
Ashley Choi (USA)	14	3	2
Zaraou Abdou Bilane (NIG)	14	3	16
Saeideh Nassiri (IRI)	12	2	4
Kamonchanok Seeken (THA)	5	10	8
Noor Mohamed (BRN)	0	2
Kyriaki Kouttouki (CYP)	12	15
Brenda Costa Rica (MEX)	2	5
Habiba Ahmed (EGY)	1	0

Round of 32
Rivka Bayech (ISR)	8	12
Zaraou Abdou Bilane (NIG)	7	9
Kamonchanok Seeken (THA)	13	14
Huang Ying-hsuan (TPE)	1	1
Süheda Nur Çelik (GER)	2	6	9
Kyriaki Kouttouki (CYP)	2	7	7
Brenda Costa Rica (MEX)	5	3
Dina Pouryounes (RTA)	4	2

Round of 16
Rivka Bayech (ISR)	22	9	6
Kamonchanok Seeken (THA)	19	17	20
Süheda Nur Çelik (GER)	7	3
Brenda Costa Rica (MEX)	2	3

Quarterfinals
Kamonchanok Seeken (THA)	13	14
Süheda Nur Çelik (GER)	0	0

==== Section 4 ====
Round of 64
Veronica Garces (PHI)	10	15
Aissata Siby (MLI)	2	8
Ida Tammila (FIN)	3	0
Alisa Angelova (AIN)	15	12
Kamila Mamedtokhtieva (KGZ)	0	0
Dângela Guimarães (BRA)	13	13
Stamatia Tsampala (GRE)	0	1
Wang Xiaolu (CHN)	4	7

Round of 32
Dalya Rehani (FRA)	0	6	2
Veronica Garces (PHI)	2	2	3
Alisa Angelova (AIN)	11^{P}	16
Andrea Ramírez (COL)	2	8
Angelique Orozco (CAN)	8	9
Dângela Guimarães (BRA)	0	1
Wang Xiaolu (CHN)	6	14
Kang Mi-reu (KOR)	5	3

Round of 16
Veronica Garces (PHI)	6	9
Alisa Angelova (AIN)	12	13^{P}
Angelique Orozco (CAN)	0	0
Wang Xiaolu (CHN)	12	11

Quarterfinals
Alisa Angelova (AIN)	4	9
Wang Xiaolu (CHN)	18	23
