= Tachiana Mangin =

Filipino taekwondo practitioner

Tachiana Keizha Mangin
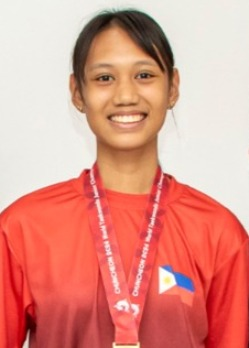
- Mangin in 2024

Personal information
- Born: November 5, 2007 (age 18) Manila, Philippines
- Height: 179 cm (5 ft 10 in)
- Weight: 49 kg (108 lb)

Sport
- Country: Philippines
- Sport: Taekwondo
- Coached by: Kirstie Alora (National Team)
Medal record
Women's taekwondo
Representing Philippines
World Junior Championships
| Gold medal – first place | 2024 Chuncheon | 49 kg |
Asian Games
| Silver medal – second place | 2026 Aichi-Nagoya | 49 kg |
SEA Games
| Gold medal – first place | 2025 Thailand | 49 kg |

Tachiana Keizha Mangin (born 5 November 2007) is a Filipino taekwondo practitioner. She won the Women's -49 kg category at the 2024 World Taekwondo Junior Championships.

== Career ==
She is trained by Kirstie Alora. She was a gold medalist at the age of 15 years-old at the kyorugi junior division of the 16th ASEAN Taekwondo Championships at the Ayala Malls Manila Bay in Parañaque City. She was also a silver medalist at the 2023 Chuncheon Korea Open International Taekwondo Championships.

She won at the Daegu 2024 World University Taekwondo Festival in South Korea in July 2024.

She was a gold medalist in the Women's -49 kg category at the 2024 World Taekwondo Junior Championships. In doing so, she became the first athlete from the Philippines to win at the event since Alex Borromeo in Barcelona in 1996.

In October 2025, she competed at the 2025 World Taekwondo Championships in the flyweight division in Wuxi, China. She was a gold medalist at the 2025 SEA Games in December, winning against 2023 World Championships silver medallist Kamonchanok Seeken of Thailand in the 49kg final.

== Personal life ==
She was a student at the University of Santo Tomas in Manila.
