= Taekwondo at the 2026 Asian Games – Women's 49 kg =

Taekwondo competition

Women's 49 kg at the 2026 Asian Games
- Venue: Toyohashi City General Gymnasium
- Date: 2 October 2026
- Competitors: 16 from 16 nations

Medalists
gold medal	Ma Jingyue	China
silver medal	Tachiana Mangin	Philippines
bronze medal	Ruka Okamoto	Japan
bronze medal	Patcharakan Poolkerd	Thailand

The women's 49 kilograms event at the 2026 Asian Games took place on 2 October 2026 at Toyohashi City General Gymnasium, Toyohashi, Japan.

Each bout consisted of up to three rounds, lasting two minutes apiece. The athlete who scored more points in each round was the winner of that round; the bout finished when one athlete had won two rounds (and thus the match).

== Schedule ==
All times are Japan Standard Time (UTC+09:00)

Date	Time	Event
Friday, 2 October 2026	13:30	Round of 16
Friday, 2 October 2026	13:30	Quarterfinals
Friday, 2 October 2026	17:10	Semifinals
Friday, 2 October 2026	17:10	Gold medal contest

== Results ==
Legend

- W — Won by withdrawal

Round of 16
Ana Belo (TLS)	7	2
Ruka Okamoto (JPN)	13	6
Sayna Karimi (IRI)	13	13
Lam Siu Wai (HKG)	2	0
Tachiana Mangin (PHI)	7	3	1
Rita Bakisheva (KAZ)	8	0	0
Wang Chieh-ling (TPE)	9	2
Fatema Kalawadh (BRN)	0	2
Nadia Aina Syazwani Ishak (MAS)	12	5
Patcharakan Poolkerd (THA)	14	11
Bat-Erdeniin Uchral (MGL)	2	1
Azeen Abdullah (KSA)	0	0
Nguyễn Thị Loan (VIE)	10	6	3
Lee Yu-min (KOR)	9	7	5
Ma Jingyue (CHN)	16	16
Tala Al-Hunaidi (ART)	1	0

Quarterfinals
Ruka Okamoto (JPN)	6	10	15^{W}
Sayna Karimi (IRI)	14	3	6
Tachiana Mangin (PHI)	0	0	2
Wang Chieh-ling (TPE)	0	3	2
' Patcharakan Poolkerd (THA)	2	17
Bat-Erdeniin Uchral (MGL)	0	8
Lee Yu-min (KOR)	3	5
Ma Jingyue (CHN)	9	16

Semifinals
Ruka Okamoto (JPN)	3	3	3
Tachiana Mangin (PHI)	3	0	3
Patcharakan Poolkerd (THA)	1	4
Ma Jingyue (CHN)	9	9

Gold medal contest
Tachiana Mangin (PHI)	0	0
Ma Jingyue (CHN)	0	0
