= Huang Kefen =

Chinese taekwondo practitioner

Personal information
- Nationality: Chinese
- Born: 18 March 2005 (age 21)

Sport
- Sport: Taekwondo
- Weight class: 58 kg
Medal record
Men's taekwondo
Representing China
World Championships
Bronze medal – third place	2025 Wuxi	58 kg

Huang Kefen (born 18 March 2005) is a Chinese taekwondo practitioner. He won a bronze medal at the 2025 World Taekwondo Championships.

== Career ==
In April 2025, Huang competed at the 7th World Taekwondo President's Cup in Tai'an, China, and won a bronze medal in the 63 kg category. In September 2025, he competed at the 15th National Games in Huizhou, Guangdong, and won a gold medal in the 58 kg category. In October 2025, he competed at the 2025 World Taekwondo Championships and won a bronze medal in the 58 kg category. Prior to his semifinal defeat to Abolfazl Zandi of Iran, he won all his matches at the Championships without dropping a round.
