= Taekwondo at the 2025 SEA Games =

- Venue: Island Hall 3rd Floor, Fashion Island
- Location: Bangkok, Thailand
- Dates: 10–13 December 2025

Taekwondo competitions at the 2025 SEA Games took place at the Island Hall 3rd Floor, Fashion Island in Bangkok, Thailand from 10 to 13 December 2025. Medals were awarded in 20 events in two categories, poomsae and kyorugi.

== Medal table ==
* Host nation (Thailand)

Rank	Nation	Gold	Silver	Bronze	Total
1	Thailand*	10	5	4	19
2	Vietnam	4	4	4	12
3	Philippines	2	6	6	14
4	Indonesia	2	2	6	10
5	Malaysia	1	1	4	6
6	Singapore	1	1	2	4
7	Myanmar	0	1	5	6
8	Laos	0	0	2	2
8	Timor-Leste	0	0	2	2
Totals (9 entries)		20	20	35	75

== Medalists ==
=== Freestyle poomsae ===
Event	Gold	Silver	Bronze
Men's individual	Justin Kobe Macario; Philippines	Atchariya Koedkaew; Thailand	Chin Ken Haw; Malaysia
Men's individual	Justin Kobe Macario; Philippines	Atchariya Koedkaew; Thailand	Darren Yap; Singapore
Women's individual	Watcharakul Limjitakorn; Thailand	Nicole Khaw; Singapore	Phouttavan Chanthakhammany; Laos
Mixed team	Vietnam; Nguyễn Phan Khánh Hân; Nguyễn Thị Y Bình; Trần Hồ Duy; Nguyễn Xuân Thành; Trần Đăng Khoa	Thailand; Sarisa Thaitonglang; Thitaree Kaewolanwasu; Sasipha Chuphon; Navin Pinthasute; Peerapat Trakarnwichit; Nattachai Sutha	Myanmar; Nyi Thar; Khaw Phyo Han; Lwin Nyo Win; Tun Wint Theingi; Soe Nine Akri; Thuzar Aye Mya
Mixed team	Vietnam; Nguyễn Phan Khánh Hân; Nguyễn Thị Y Bình; Trần Hồ Duy; Nguyễn Xuân Thành; Trần Đăng Khoa	Thailand; Sarisa Thaitonglang; Thitaree Kaewolanwasu; Sasipha Chuphon; Navin Pinthasute; Peerapat Trakarnwichit; Nattachai Sutha	Philippines; Darius Venerable; Justin Kobe Macario; Jeus Gabriel Yape; Juvenile Crisostomo; Janna Olivia

=== Recognized poomsae ===
Event	Gold	Silver	Bronze
Men's team	Indonesia; Muhammad Rizal; Muhammad Alfi Kusuma; Muhammad Hafizh Fachrur Rhozy	Philippines; Ian Mattew Corton; King Nash Alcairo; Rodolfo Reyes Jr.	Malaysia; Chin Ken Haw; Jason Loo Jun Wei; Randy Linggi
Men's team	Indonesia; Muhammad Rizal; Muhammad Alfi Kusuma; Muhammad Hafizh Fachrur Rhozy	Philippines; Ian Mattew Corton; King Nash Alcairo; Rodolfo Reyes Jr.	Thailand; Sippakorn Wetchakornpatiwong; Navin Pinthasute; Thana Kiewlailerd
Women's team	Malaysia; Seah Jing Ying; Yow Mei Yee; Wong Zin	Thailand; Chutikarn Lapnitayapan; Ratchadawan Tapaenthong; Chonlakorn Chayawatto	Vietnam; Nguyễn Thị Kim Hà; Lê Trần Kim Uyên; Lê Ngọc Hân
Women's team	Malaysia; Seah Jing Ying; Yow Mei Yee; Wong Zin	Thailand; Chutikarn Lapnitayapan; Ratchadawan Tapaenthong; Chonlakorn Chayawatto	Timor-Leste; Merlinda da Costa Soares; Dircia Adolfina Claudia Punef; Try Xena Lindsay da Costa Dias
Mixed pair	Singapore; Diyanah Aqidah; Nicholas Khaw	Vietnam; Nguyễn Thị Kim Hà; Nguyễn Trọng Phúc	Thailand; Thana Kiewlailerd; Chonlakorn Chayawatto
Mixed pair	Singapore; Diyanah Aqidah; Nicholas Khaw	Vietnam; Nguyễn Thị Kim Hà; Nguyễn Trọng Phúc	Philippines; Jocel Lyn Ninobla; Patrick King Perez

=== Men's kyorugi ===
Event	Gold	Silver	Bronze
Finweight; 54 kg	Nguyễn Hồng Trọng; Vietnam	Aziz Hidayat Tumakaka; Indonesia	Keston Pang; Singapore
Finweight; 54 kg	Nguyễn Hồng Trọng; Vietnam	Aziz Hidayat Tumakaka; Indonesia	Kurt Bryan Barbosa; Philippines
Flyweight; 58 kg	Sirawit Mahamad; Thailand	Đinh Công Khoa; Vietnam	Fu Cern Put Thai; Malaysia
Flyweight; 58 kg	Sirawit Mahamad; Thailand	Đinh Công Khoa; Vietnam	Aljen Aynaga; Philippines
Bantamweight; 63 kg	Thanapoom Fuangnoi; Thailand	Kenneth Buenavides; Philippines	Phoutthasone Sayyaseng; Laos
Bantamweight; 63 kg	Thanapoom Fuangnoi; Thailand	Kenneth Buenavides; Philippines	Muhammad Bassam Raihan; Indonesia
Featherweight; 68 kg	Banlung Tubtimdang; Thailand	Nusair Lao; Philippines	Thu Hein Htet; Myanmar
Featherweight; 68 kg	Banlung Tubtimdang; Thailand	Nusair Lao; Philippines	Arun Raj Ram Bharat; Malaysia
Lightweight; 74 kg	Arya Danu Susilo; Indonesia	Lý Hồng Phúc; Vietnam	Dave Cea; Philippines
Lightweight; 74 kg	Arya Danu Susilo; Indonesia	Lý Hồng Phúc; Vietnam	Krittayot Phrompatju; Thailand
Welterweight; 80 kg	Thanathorn Saejo; Thailand	Mhd Raihan Fadhila; Indonesia	Htet Zaw Lin; Myanmar
Welterweight; 80 kg	Thanathorn Saejo; Thailand	Mhd Raihan Fadhila; Indonesia	Phạm Minh Bảo Kha; Vietnam
Middleweight; 87 kg	Chaichon Cho; Thailand	Muhammad Syafiq Zuber; Malaysia	Osanando Naufal Khairudin; Indonesia
Middleweight; 87 kg	Chaichon Cho; Thailand	Muhammad Syafiq Zuber; Malaysia	Mota Messias Dates; Timor-Leste

=== Women's kyorugi ===
Event	Gold	Silver	Bronze
Finweight; 46 kg	Patcharakan Poolkerd; Thailand	Clarence Sarza; Philippines	Nguyễn Thị Mai; Vietnam
Finweight; 46 kg	Patcharakan Poolkerd; Thailand	Clarence Sarza; Philippines	Ni Kadek Heni Prikasih; Indonesia
Flyweight; 49 kg	Tachiana Mangin; Philippines	Kamonchanok Seeken; Thailand	Trương Thị Kim Tuyền; Vietnam
Flyweight; 49 kg	Tachiana Mangin; Philippines	Kamonchanok Seeken; Thailand	Winda Dwi Putri; Indonesia
Bantamweight; 53 kg	Chutikan Jongkolrattanawattana; Thailand	Nguyễn Thị Loan; Vietnam	Megawati Tamesti Maheswari; Indonesia
Bantamweight; 53 kg	Chutikan Jongkolrattanawattana; Thailand	Nguyễn Thị Loan; Vietnam	Jessica Canabal; Philippines
Featherweight; 57 kg	Trần Thị Ánh Tuyết; Vietnam	Phannapa Harnsujin; Thailand	Myat Moe Myint; Myanmar
Featherweight; 57 kg	Trần Thị Ánh Tuyết; Vietnam	Phannapa Harnsujin; Thailand	Silvana Lamanda; Indonesia
Lightweight; 63 kg	Sasikarn Tongchan; Thailand	Merica Chan; Philippines	Kaung Nan Thounarry; Myanmar
Welterweight; 67 kg	Piyachutrutai Chareewan; Thailand	Kay Thwe Mon Lin; Myanmar	not awarded
Middleweight; 73 kg	Bạc Thị Khiêm; Vietnam	Laila Delo; Philippines	Kannaluck Chuenchooklin; Thailand

== Results ==
=== Poomsae ===
==== Freestyle ====
Men's individual

Rank	Athlete	Score
1st place, gold medalist(s)	Justin Kobe Macario (PHI)	8.200
2nd place, silver medalist(s)	Atchariya Koedkaew (THA)	8.100
3rd place, bronze medalist(s)	Chin Ken Haw (MAS)	7.740
3rd place, bronze medalist(s)	Darren Yap (SGP)	7.660
4	Andi Sultan Altaf Mirza (INA)	7.360
5	Lwin Nyo Min (MYA)	6.860
6	Anouphong Djaniguian (LAO)	3.000

Women's individual

Rank	Athlete	Score
1st place, gold medalist(s)	Watcharakul Limjitakorn (THA)	7.900
2nd place, silver medalist(s)	Nichole Khaw (SGP)	7.180
3rd place, bronze medalist(s)	Phouttavan Chanthakhammany (LAO)	1.680

Mixed team

Rank	Country	Score
1st place, gold medalist(s)	Vietnam	8.060
2nd place, silver medalist(s)	Thailand	7.940
3rd place, bronze medalist(s)	Myanmar	7.060
3rd place, bronze medalist(s)	Philippines	7.580

==== Recognized ====
Men's team

Quarterfinals		Semifinals		Gold medal match
		Thailand	8.540
Philippines	8.630	Philippines	8.610
Singapore	8.250			Philippines	8.530
Myanmar	0.000			Indonesia	8.710
Indonesia	0.000	Indonesia	8.650
Vietnam	8.490	Malaysia	8.440
Malaysia	8.590

Women's team

Quarterfinals		Semifinals		Gold medal match
		Thailand	8.580
Laos	7.890	Vietnam	8.430
Vietnam	8.490			Thailand	8.450
				Malaysia	8.560
		Malaysia	8.500
		Timor-Leste	7.590

Mixed pair

Quarterfinals		Semifinals		Gold medal match
		Nguyễn Thị Kim Hà (VIE); Nguyễn Trọng Phúc (VIE)	8.680
Jason Loo Jun Wei (MAS); Nur Humaira Abdul Karim (MAS)	8.460	Thana Kiewlailerd (THA); Chonlakorn Chayawatto (THA)	8.680
Thana Kiewlailerd (THA); Chonlakorn Chayawatto (THA)	8.460			Nguyễn Thị Kim Hà (VIE); Nguyễn Trọng Phúc (VIE)	8.440
Jocel Lyn Ninobla (PHI); Patrick King Perez (PHI)	8.440			Diyanah Aqidah (SGP); Nicholas Khaw (SGP)	8.670
Khant Kaung Zinn (MYA); Thuzar Aye Mya (MYA)	8.160	Jocel Lyn Ninobla (PHI); Patrick King Perez (PHI)	8.520
Anouphong Djaniguian (LAO); Yotthida Kenphokham (LAO)	8.040	Diyanah Aqidah (SGP); Nicholas Khaw (SGP)	8.620
Diyanah Aqidah (SGP); Nicholas Khaw (SGP)	8.410

=== Kyorugi ===
==== Men's ====
54 kg

Round of 16
Moganarrajan Perumal (MAS)	2
Ko Phengphilavong (LAO)	0

Quarterfinals
Moganarrajan Perumal (MAS)	0
Aziz Hidayat Tumakaka (INA)	2
Muhammad Abrar bin Haji Bakar (BRU)	0
Keston Pang (SGP)	2
Kurt Bryan Barbosa (PHI)	2
Wisawakorn Jaichoo (THA)	1
Devinho Cerilo da Costa (TLS)	0
Nguyễn Hồng Trọng (VIE)	2

Semifinals
Aziz Hidayat Tumakaka (INA)	2
Keston Pang (SGP)	0
Kurt Bryan Barbosa (PHI)	1
Nguyễn Hồng Trọng (VIE)	2

Gold medal match
Aziz Hidayat Tumakaka (INA)	1
Nguyễn Hồng Trọng (VIE)	2

58 kg

Quarterfinals		Semifinals		Gold medal match
Sirawit Mahamad (THA)	2
Cerilio do Rego Cruz Lein (TLS)	0	Sirawit Mahamad (THA)	2
Cern Put Thai Fu (MAS)	2	Cern Put Thai Fu (MAS)	1
Lukkee Sengmanee (LAO)	0			Sirawit Mahamad (THA)	2
Đinh Công Khoa (VIE)	WDQ			Đinh Công Khoa (VIE)	1
Sam Yodeth (CAM)	DSQ	Đinh Công Khoa (VIE)	2
Phyo Shine Yawai (MYA)	0	Aljen Aynaga (PHI)	1
Aljen Aynaga (PHI)	2

63 kg

Quarterfinals		Semifinals		Gold medal match
Regan Chin (SGP)	1
Phoutthasone Sayyaseng (LAO)	2	Phoutthasone Sayyaseng (LAO)	0
Lê Tuấn (VIE)	0	Kenneth Buenavides (PHI)	2
Kenneth Buenavides (PHI)	2			Kenneth Buenavides (PHI)	0
Muhammad Bassam Raihan (INA)	2			Thanapoom Fuangnoi (THA)	2
Lokadevan Anatore (MAS)	0	Muhammad Bassam Raihan (INA)	0
Aung Shine Htet (MYA)	0	Thanapoom Fuangnoi (THA)	2
Thanapoom Fuangnoi (THA)	2

68 kg

Quarterfinals		Semifinals		Gold medal match
		Banlung Tubtimdang (THA)	2
Thu Hein Htet (MYA)	WDQ	Thu Hein Htet (MYA)	0
Mean Soursayik (CAM)	DSQ			Banlung Tubtimdang (THA)	2
Arun Raj Ram Bharat (MAS)	0			Nusair Lao (PHI)	0
Nusair Lao (PHI)	2	Arun Raj Ram Bharat (MAS)	0
		Nusair Lao (PHI)	2

74 kg

Quarterfinals		Semifinals		Gold medal match
		Dave Cea (PHI)	1
Htike Yin Min (MYA)	0	Lý Hồng Phúc (VIE)	2
Lý Hồng Phúc (VIE)	2			Lý Hồng Phúc (VIE)	0
				Arya Danu Susilo (INA)	2
		Krittayot Phrompatju (THA)	0
		Arya Danu Susilo (INA)	2

80 kg

Quarterfinals		Semifinals		Gold medal match
		Mhd Raihan Fadhila (INA)	2
Htet Zaw Lin (MYA)	WDQ	Htet Zaw Lin (MYA)	0
Va Mithona (CAM)	DSQ			Mhd Raihan Fadhila (INA)	0
				Thanathorn Saejo (THA)	2
		Thanathorn Saejo (THA)	2
		Phạm Minh Bảo Kha (VIE)	0

87 kg

Quarterfinals
Mota Messias Dates (TLS)	WDQ
Chhun Soklong (CAM)	DSQ

Semifinals
Chaichon Cho (THA)	2
Osanando Naufal Khairudin (INA)	0
Muhammad Syafiq Zuber (MAS)	2
Mota Messias Dates (TLS)	0

Gold medal match
Chaichon Cho (THA)	2
Muhammad Syafiq Zuber (MAS)	1

==== Women's ====
46 kg

Quarterfinals		Semifinals		Gold medal match
Patcharakan Poolkerd (THA)	2
Sengdao Homsombat (LAO)	0	Patcharakan Poolkerd (THA)	2
Ana Belo (TLS)	0	Nguyễn Thị Mai (VIE)	0
Nguyễn Thị Mai (VIE)	2			Patcharakan Poolkerd (THA)	2
Ni Kadek Heni Prikasih (INA)	2			Clarence Sarza (PHI)	0
Cezann Teng (SGP)	0	Ni Kadek Heni Prikasih (INA)	0
Jean Ho (MAS)	0	Clarence Sarza (PHI)	2
Clarence Sarza (PHI)	2

49 kg

Quarterfinals		Semifinals		Gold medal match
Kamonchanok Seeken (THA)	2
Phyo Saung June (MYA)	0	Kamonchanok Seeken (THA)	2
Nadia Aina Syazwani Ishak (MAS)	0	Trương Thị Kim Tuyền (VIE)	0
Trương Thị Kim Tuyền (VIE)	2			Kamonchanok Seeken (THA)	0
Winda Dwi Putri (INA)	2			Tachiana Mangin (PHI)	2
Domingas do Rego Cruz Lein (TLS)	0	Winda Dwi Putri (INA)	0
Phonnapha Djaniguian (LAO)	0	Tachiana Mangin (PHI)	2
Tachiana Mangin (PHI)	2

53 kg

Quarterfinals		Semifinals		Gold medal match
		Chutikan Jongkolrattanawattana (THA)	2
Nichelle Tan (SGP)	0	Megawati Tamesti Maheswari (INA)	0
Megawati Tamesti Maheswari (INA)	2			Chutikan Jongkolrattanawattana (THA)	2
Jessica Canabal (PHI)	2			Nguyễn Thị Loan (VIE)	0
Norumar Mohd Firdaus (MAS)	0	Jessica Canabal (PHI)	0
Teresa Semoi do Rego Cruz Lein (TLS)	0	Nguyễn Thị Loan (VIE)	2
Nguyễn Thị Loan (VIE)	2

57 kg

Quarterfinals		Semifinals		Gold medal match
		Trần Thị Ánh Tuyết (VIE)	2
Myat Moe Myint (MYA)	WDQ	Myat Moe Myint (MYA)	0
Aliza Chhoeung (CAM)	DSQ			Trần Thị Ánh Tuyết (VIE)	2
				Phannapa Harnsujin (THA)	1
		Phannapa Harnsujin (THA)	2
		Silvana Lamanda (INA)	0

62 kg

Quarterfinals		Semifinals		Gold medal match
		Sasikarn Tongchan (THA)	2
Kaung Nan Thounarry (MYA)	2	Kaung Nan Thounarry (MYA)	0
Ingrid Poetri Iskandar (SGP)	1			Sasikarn Tongchan (THA)	2
				Merica Chan (PHI)	0
		Merica Chan (PHI)	WDQ
		Julie Mam (CAM)	DSQ

67 kg

Semifinals		Gold medal match
Van Borey (CAM)	DSQ
Bye		Mon Lin Kay Thwe (MYA)	0
		Piyachutrutai Chareewan (THA)	2

73 kg

Quarterfinals		Semifinals		Gold medal match
		Bạc Thị Khiêm (VIE)	2
Thidasavanh Sotthachit (LAO)	0	Kannaluck Chuenchooklin (THA)	0
Kannaluck Chuenchooklin (THA)	2			Bạc Thị Khiêm (VIE)	2
				Laila Delo (PHI)	0
		Laila Delo (PHI)	WDQ
		Sok Sreytoch (CAM)	DSQ
