= Georgii Gurtsiev =

Belarusian taekwondo practitioner (born 2000)

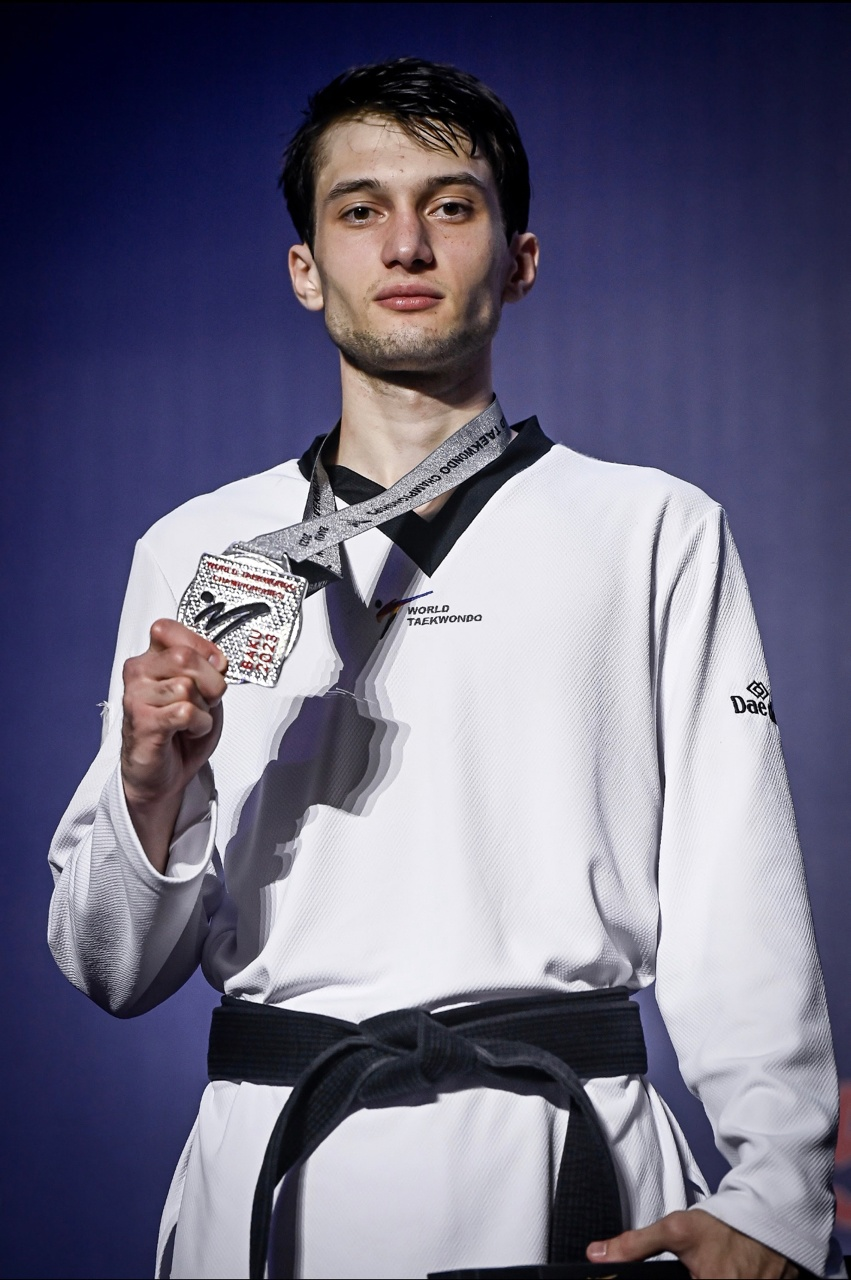
- Gurtsiev in 2023

Personal information
- Native name: Георгий Казбекович Гурциев
- Full name: Georgii Kazbekovich Gurtsiev
- Nationality: Belarusian
- Born: 16 October 2000 (age 25) Vladikavkaz, Russia

Sport
- Sport: Taekwondo
- Weight class: 58 kg
Medal record
Men's taekwondo
Representing Individual Neutral Athletes
World Championships
Silver medal – second place	2023 Baku	58 kg
Silver medal – second place	2025 Wuxi	58 kg
Representing Belarus
European Championships
Gold medal – first place	2026 Munich	58 kg

Georgii Kazbekovich Gurtsiev (Russian: Георгий Казбекович Гурциев; born 16 October 2000) is a Belarusian taekwondo practitioner. He is a two-time silver medalist at the World Taekwondo Championships.

== Career ==
Gurtsiev competed at the 2023 World Taekwondo Championships and won a silver medal in the 58 kg category, losing to Bae Jun-seo in the finals. He represented Individual Neutral Athletes at the 2024 Summer Olympics in the 58 kg category and lost in the round of 16.

In May 2025, he competed at the 10th World Taekwondo Presidents Cup in Sofia, and won a bronze medal in the 58 kg category. In October 2025, he competed at the 2025 World Taekwondo Championships and won a silver medal in the 58 kg category, losing to Abolfazl Zandi in the finals.

In May 2026, he competed at the 2026 European Taekwondo Championships and won a gold medal in the 58 kg category.
