= Sasikarn Tongchan =

Thai taekwondo practitioner (born 2003)

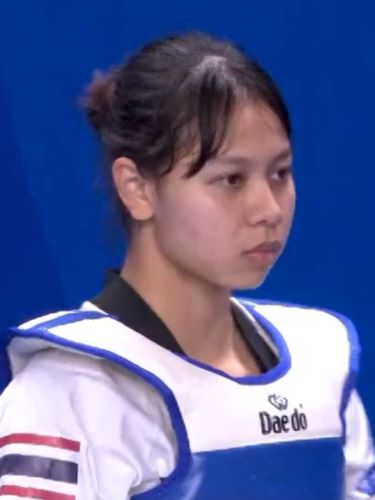
- Sasikarn Tongchan

Personal information
- Nickname: Baitoey
- Born: 19 September 2003 (age 23) Nakhon Pathom, Thailand
- Height: 171 cm (5 ft 7 in)

Sport
- Sport: Taekwondo
- Coached by: Choi Young-seok
Medal record
Representing Thailand
Asian Championships
Gold medal – first place	2024 Da Nang	62 kg
Bronze medal – third place	2022 Chuncheon	62 kg
SEA Games
Gold medal – first place	2025 Thailand	63 kg
Gold medal – first place	2023 Cambodia	62 kg
Silver medal – second place	2021 Vietnam	62 kg
World University Games
Gold medal – first place	2021 Chengdu	62 kg
Bronze medal – third place	2025 Rhine-Ruhr	62 kg

Sasikarn Tongchan (born 19 September 2003) is a Thai taekwondo practitioner. She won a gold medal at the 2024 Asian Taekwondo Championships in the –62kg category.

== Career ==
She won a silver medal at the 2021 SEA Games in Hanoi, Vietnam in a May 2022. In June 2022, she won a bronze medal in the 62kg category at the 2022 Asian Taekwondo Championships in Chuncheon, South Korea.

She won gold in Cambodia at the Taekwondo at the 2023 SEA Games in the 62kg division in May 2023. In August 2023, she won gold in the 62kg at the delayed 2021 Summer World University Games in Chengdu.

In February 2024, she won the Turkish Open in Antalya. She won a gold medal at the 2024 Asian Taekwondo Championships in Vietnam, in the -62kg category. She entered the 2024 Asian Taekwondo Olympic Qualification Tournament and earned a place at the upcoming Olympics. She was subsequently selected to compete at the 2024 Summer Olympics in Paris.

She won a bronze medal in the team kyorugi event at the 2025 World University Games, as the discipline made its debut as a medal event. She also won a bronze medal in the women's -62kg category at the 2025 World University Games in Germany in July 2025. In December, she was a gold medalist at the 2025 SEA Games in Bangkok in the women's -63 kg category.
