= Ruka Okamoto =

Japanese taekwondo practitioner

Personal information
- Born: 11 March 2006 (age 20) Saga Prefecture, Japan
- Height: 164 cm (5 ft 5 in)

Sport
- Country: Japan
- Sport: Taekwondo
- Weight class: 46 kg, 49 kg
Medal record
Women's taekwondo
Representing Japan
World Championships
Bronze medal – third place	2023 Baku	46 kg
Asian Games
Bronze medal – third place	2026 Aichi-Nagoya	49 kg
World Junior Championships
Bronze medal – third place	2022 Sofia	46 kg

Ruka Okamoto (岡本 留佳, Okamoto Ruka) (born 11 March 2006) is a Japanese taekwondo practitioner. She won bronze medal at the 2023 World Championships.

== Achievements ==
Year	Event	Location	Place
2022	World Junior Championships	Sofia, Bulgaria	3rd
2023	World Championships	Baku, Azerbaijan	3rd
2026	Asian Games	Toyohashi, Japan	3rd
