= Ma Jingyue =

Chinese taekwondo practitioner (born 2000)

Personal information
- Nationality: Chinese
- Born: 19 December 2000 (age 25)

Sport
- Sport: Taekwondo
- Weight class: 49 kg
Medal record
Representing China
Women's taekwondo
Asian Championships
Bronze medal – third place	2026 Ulaanbaatar	49 kg
Asian Games
Gold medal – first place	2026 Aichi-Nagoya	49 kg
World University Games
Gold medal – first place	2025 Rhine-Ruhr	49 kg

Ma Jingyue (Chinese: 馬靜月; born 19 December 2000) is a Chinese taekwondo practitioner. She is an Asian Games and FISU World University Games gold medalist.

== Career ==
In July 2025, Ma competed at the 2025 Summer World University Games and won a gold medal in the 49 kg category.

In May 2026, she competed at the 2026 Asian Taekwondo Championships and won a gold medal in the 49 kg category. She was subsequently selected to represent China at the 2026 Asian Games. During the Asian Games she won a gold medal in the 49 kg category.
