= Ouhoud Ben Aoun =

Tunisian taekwondo practitioner (born 2003)

Personal information
- Born: 25 January 2003 (age 23)

Sport
- Sport: Taekwondo
Medal record
Representing Tunisia
African Games
| Gold medal – first place | 2023 Accra | 53 kg |
African Taekwondo Championships
| Silver medal – second place | 2022 Kigali | 53 kg |
World University Games
| Bronze medal – third place | 2025 Rhine-Ruhr | 53 kg |

Ouhoud Ben Aoun (born 25 January 2003) is a Tunisian taekwondo practitioner. She was a gold medalist at the 2023 African Games.

== Career ==
She won the silver medal in the -53 kg category at the 2022 African Taekwondo Championships in Kigali, Rwanda, finishing runner-up to Oumaima El-Bouchti of Morocco.

In March 2024, she won the gold medal in the -53 kg division at the delayed 2023 African Games, held in Accra, Ghana, defeating Bouma Coulibaly in the final.

She won a bronze medal at the 2025 Summer World University Games in Germany in the -53 kg division.
