= Tamirlan Tleules =

Kazhak taekwondo practitioner (born 2005)

Personal information
- Born: 11 October 2005 (age 21)

Sport
- Sport: Taekwondo
Medal record
Men's taekwondo
Representing Kazakhstan
Asian Games
Gold medal – first place	2026 Aichi-Nagoya	58 kg
World University Games
Bronze medal – third place	2025 Rhine-Ruhr	58kg
World U21 Championships
Bronze medal – third place	2025 Nairobi	63 kg
World Junior Championships
Silver medal – second place	2022 Sofia	51 kg

Tamirlan Tleules (born 11 October 2005) is a Kazakh taekwondo practitioner.

== Career ==
He was a bronze medalist in the -51 kg division at the 2022 Asian Junior Taekwondo Championships in Ho Chi Minh City, Vietnam. He was a silver medalist in the men's -51 kg division at the 2022 World Taekwondo Junior Championships in Sofia, Bulgaria.

He placed third at the World Taekwondo Grand Prix Challenge events in Charlotte, North Carolina and in Wuju, South Korea, in June and July 2025. He was a bronze medalist at the 2025 Summer Universiade in Essen, Germany in the men's -58 kg division.
