= Abolfazl Zandi =

Iranian taekwondo practitioner

Personal information
- Native name: ابوالفضل زندی
- Nationality: Iranian
- Born: 14 February 2005 (age 21) Nazarabad, Iran

Sport
- Sport: Taekwondo
- Weight class: 58 kg
Medal record
Men's taekwondo
Representing Iran
World Championships
| Gold medal – first place | 2025 Wuxi | 58 kg |
Asian Championships
| Gold medal – first place | 2026 Ulaanbaatar | 58 kg |
| Bronze medal – third place | 2024 Da Nang | 58 kg |
World U21 Championships
| Gold medal – first place | 2025 Nairobi | 58 kg |
WT Presidents Cup
| Gold medal – first place | 2026 Asia | 58 kg |
World Taekwondo Grand Prix Series
| Gold medal – first place | 2026 Paris | 58 kg |
World Junior Championships
| Gold medal – first place | 2022 Sofia | 48 kg |

Abolfazl Zandi (Persian: ابوالفضل زندی) is an Iranian taekwondo practitioner. He won a gold medal at the 2025 World Taekwondo Championships.

== Career ==
Zandi competed at the 2022 World Taekwondo Junior Championships and won a gold medal in the 48 kg category. He competed at the 2024 Asian Taekwondo Championships and won a bronze medal in the 58 kg category.

In February 2025, he won gold at the Fujairah Open in the Men's 58 kg category. In October, he competed at the 2025 World Taekwondo Championships and won a gold medal in the 58 kg category, defeating Georgii Gurtsiev in the finals. This was Iran's first gold medal at the World Taekwondo Championships in this category since Farzan Ashourzadeh in 2015. Continuing this, he won the gold at the U21 World Championships in Kenya in December of that year.

In May 2026, Zandi won gold in the 58 kg division of the 2026 Asian Taekwondo Championships in Ulaanbaatar. In August, he again won gold, this time in the WT President's Cup Asia in Lahore, notably defeating Olympic champion Park Tae Joon in the semifinals. His undefeated streak came to an end in September, where he lost to three time world champion Bae Jun Seo in Round 16 of the Muju World Taekwondo Grand Prix. However, in October, he won gold in the Paris World Taekwondo Grand Prix, defeating Park again in the finals.
