= Kyrgyzstan at the 2025 Summer World University Games =

- Flag of Kyrgyzstan
- IOC code: KGZ
- National federation: Student Sports Federation of Kyrgyzstan

in Rhine-Ruhr, Germany 16 July 2025 – 27 July 2025
- Competitors: 15 in 5 sports
- Flag bearer: Emirkhan Zholdoshkaziev (judo)
- Medals Ranked 38th: Gold 1 Silver 0 Bronze 1 Total 2

Summer World University Games appearances
- 1959; 1961; 1963; 1965; 1967; 1970; 1973; 1975; 1977; 1979; 1981; 1983; 1985; 1987; 1989; 1991; 1993; 1995; 1997; 1999; 2001; 2003; 2005; 2007; 2009; 2011; 2013; 2015; 2017; 2019; 2021; 2025; 2027

Kyrgyzstan competed at the 2025 Summer World University Games in Rhine-Ruhr, Germany held from 16 to 27 July 2025. Kyrgyzstan was represented by 15 athletes and took thirty-eighth place in the medal table with two medals. Emirkhan Zholdoshkaziev (judo) was a flag bearer at the opening ceermony.

== Medal summary ==
=== Medal by sports ===
Rank	Sports	Gold	Silver	Bronze	Total
1	Swimming	1	0	0	1
2	Taekwondo	0	0	1	1
Totals (2 entries)		1	0	1	2

Source: rhineruhr2025.com

=== Medalists ===
Medal	Name	Sport	Event	Date
Gold	Denis Petrashov	Swimming	Men's 100m breaststroke	18 July
Bronze	Nurkhan Samidinov	Taekwondo	Men -54kg	19 July
