= Sirawit Mahamad =

Thai taekwondo practitioner (born 2003)

Personal information
- Born: 3 April 2003 (age 23)

Sport
- Sport: Taekwondo
Medal record
Men's taekwondo
Representing Thailand
SEA Games
Gold medal – first place	2025 Thailand	58 kg
World University Games
Silver medal – second place	2025 Rhine-Ruhr	-58kg
Bronze medal – third place	2023 Chengdu	-54kg

Sirawit Mahamad (Thai: สิรวิชญ์ มะหะหมัด; born 3 April 2003) is a Thai taekwondo practitioner. He was a silver medalist at the 2025 World University Games and a gold medalist at the 2025 SEA Games.

== Career ==
Mahamad was runner-up at the Muju World Taekwondo Grand Prix Challenge in the -58kg division in July 2023. He was a bronze medalist in the -54kg division at the delayed 2021 Summer World University Games, held in Chengdu, China in August 2023.

He had a third place finish at the Belgian Open Taekwondo in March 2025. He was a silver medalist at the 2025 Summer World University Games in Essen, Germany in the men's -58kg division. He was subsequently selected for the 2025 World Taekwondo Championships in Wuxi, China. He was a gold medalist at the 2025 SEA Games, securing the gold medal with a last second win over Vietnam’s Dinh Ciong Khoa in the final.
