= Armenia at the 2025 Summer World University Games =

- Flag of Armenia
- IOC code: ARM
- National federation: Armenian Student Sports Federation

in Rhine-Ruhr, Germany 16 July 2025 – 27 July 2025
- Competitors: 18 in 7 sports
- Medals Ranked 39th: Gold 1 Silver 0 Bronze 0 Total 1

Summer World University Games appearances
- 1959; 1961; 1963; 1965; 1967; 1970; 1973; 1975; 1977; 1979; 1981; 1983; 1985; 1987; 1989; 1991; 1993; 1995; 1997; 1999; 2001; 2003; 2005; 2007; 2009; 2011; 2013; 2015; 2017; 2019; 2021; 2025; 2027

Armenia competed at the 2025 Summer World University Games in Rhine-Ruhr, Germany held from 16 to 27 July 2025. Armenia was represented by 18 athletes and took thirty-ninth place in the medal table with one medal.

== Medal summary ==
=== Medal by sports ===
Rank	Sports	Gold	Silver	Bronze	Total
1	Artistic gymnastics	1	0	0	1
Totals (1 entries)		1	0	0	1

Source: rhineruhr2025.com

=== Medalists ===
Medal	Name	Sport	Event	Date
Gold	Hamlet Manukyan	Artistic gymnastics	Men's pommel horse	26 July
