= 2025 Summer World University Games =

Multi-sport event in Rhine-Ruhr, Germany

2025 FISU Summer World University Games
- Host city: Rhine-Ruhr metropolitan region (Note: Swimming, diving and volleyball were held in Berlin.)
- Country: Germany
- Motto: A Summer With Distinction (German: Sommer Cum Laude)
- Nations: 113
- Athletes: 6,233
- Events: 234 in 18 sports
- Opening: 16 July 2025
- Closing: 27 July 2025
- Opened by: Bärbel Bas; Federal Minister of Labour and Social Affairs of Germany
- Torch lighter: Alexander Wieczerzak; Max Hartung; Mathias Mester; Nico Schlotterbeck; Sarah Wellbrock; Sonja Greinacher
- Main venue: MSV-Arena (opening ceremony); Landschaftspark Duisburg-Nord (closing ceremony)
- Website: rhineruhr2025.com/en

The 2025 FISU Summer World University Games, also known as Rhine-Ruhr 2025, was a multi-sport event held from 16 to 27 July 2025, in five cities in Rhine-Ruhr metropolitan region and in Berlin as an outlying venue in Germany. The Rhine-Ruhr region had previously hosted the 1989 Summer Universiade in Duisburg.

The event returned to its traditional 2-year cycle following the 2021 Summer World University Games in Chengdu, first postponed until 2022 and then postponed again to 2023 due to the COVID-19 pandemic (replacing Yekaterinburg 2023 due to Russian invasion of Ukraine). The event is organized by the International University Sports Federation (FISU).

== Host selection ==
The German University Sports Federation (ADH) announced in August 2018 that it intended to submit a bid to FISU for a future edition of the Summer Universiade. However, the choice of which edition and which city/region was interested was delayed until August of that same year because of school holidays. However, the choice of which edition and which city/region was interested was delayed until August of that same year because of school holidays and also for bureaucratic reasons and as the venues for the 2021 and 2023 editions had already been chosen, it would be up to the entity to choose the next host city process opened which was 2025. Also noteworthy is the ADH proposal, which received approval from the German parliament in record time, being made in December of same year.

Thus, the first form of contact was made soon afterwards. In mid-April 2019, an ADH delegation visited FISU headquarters in Lausanne, Switzerland, which was pleased with the German intention to host the Summer Universiade, and it was agreed to immediately maintain a close and continuous talks issues related to the executive project and the rules for the bid. With the delivery of the “Letter of Intent” to FISU in the second half of June, the bidding process began, which was approved by 95.4% of voting members present at the ADH general assembly in November and It was another milestone towards the official bid project. Reception to the project grew exponentially and positively to the point that the Federal Ministry of the Interior, Minister-President of North Rhine-Westphalia, German Olympic Sports Confederation also almost immediately approved the proposal and started talking to the cities of Bochum, Duisburg, Düsseldorf, Essen, and Mülheim an der Ruhr so that a joint bid for the Rhine-Ruhr metropolitan region could be made, given their ease and proximity.

The idea also excited the member schools of the ADH, as well as other partners in organized sport and the scientific concept. In September 2020, the feasibility study for a joint project involving 5 cities in the Rhine-Ruhr Region was released. In September 2020, the feasibility study for a joint project involving 5 cities in the Rhine-Ruhr Region was released and approved in a virtual plenary session of the Landtag Nordrhein-Westfalen and which unanimously approved the proposal on 20 October 2020. In mid-March 2021, the ADH was able to report that the bid book had been submitted to FISU within the deadline. Following the final inspection visit by a FISU delegation from 7–5 May 2021, the final decision of the FISU Executive Committee was pending at its meeting on 15 May 2021 in Düsseldorf with a decision in favor of the regional proposal.

It was also expected that Budapest, the Hungarian capital that had applied to host the 2019 Summer Universiade, would make a proposal to FISU, but the city withdrew due to a lack of accommodation and other conditions. However, it was already known that FISU was in favor of the German bid.

=== Reactions to the German application ===
FISU was particularly impressed by the confident approach that the determination of a host location or region should be based on the results of a feasibility study or potential analysis, which was considered a very sensible approach, especially against the background of Hamburg's failed bid for the 2024 Summer Olympics. This will be the fourth time that the World University Games will be held in a region, instead of being centralized in a host city.

2025 Summer World University Games bidding results
City / region	Nation	Votes
Rhine-Ruhr metropolitan region	Germany	Unanimous

== Development and preparations ==
=== Venues ===
The organising committee used existing and temporary sports facilities, with some existing venues being renovated for these games. Unlike previous editions, this edition was completely decentralized. Instead of an athlete's village, athletes stayed in hotels and university residential buildings around the host cities and regions. The competition venues are spread over five cities in the North Rhine-Westphalia state (Bochum, Duisburg, Essen, Hagen and Mülheim) and the German capital Berlin.

Originally, Düsseldorf was scheduled to host some sporting events and the opening ceremonies, but due to changes related to logistics and the event size, the city withdrew, and the event had to be replanned due to cost countermeasures.

After this change, in September 2024, it was announced that Hagen and Berlin were added as host cities. Even though Berlin is more than 500km from the host region, it was considered the most plausible financial option for the organization to transfer three sports to Berlin (swimming, diving and volleyball), as well as expanding the competition area to Hagen to host some preliminary basketball games.

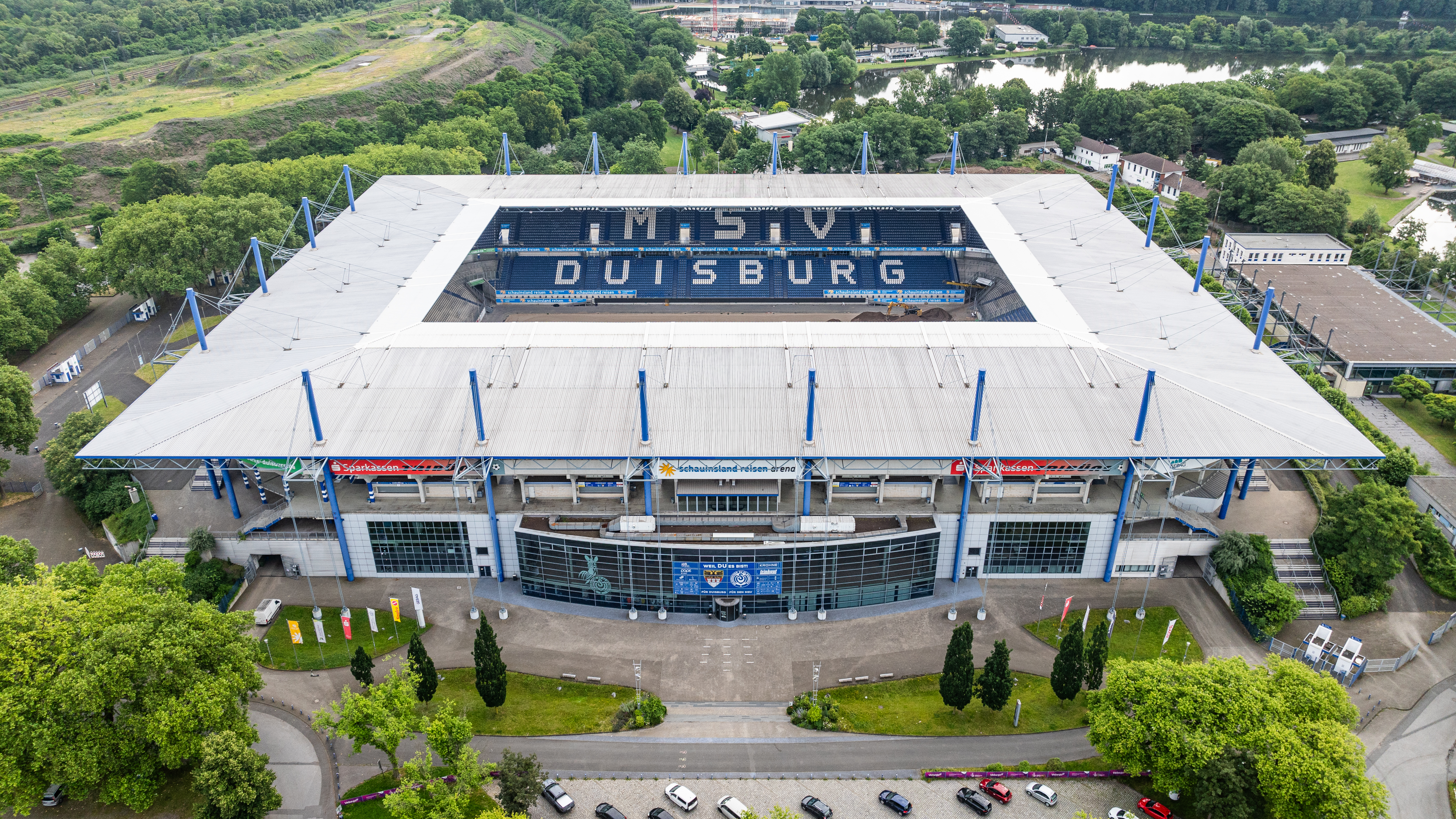
The MSV Arena in Duisburg hosted the opening ceremony

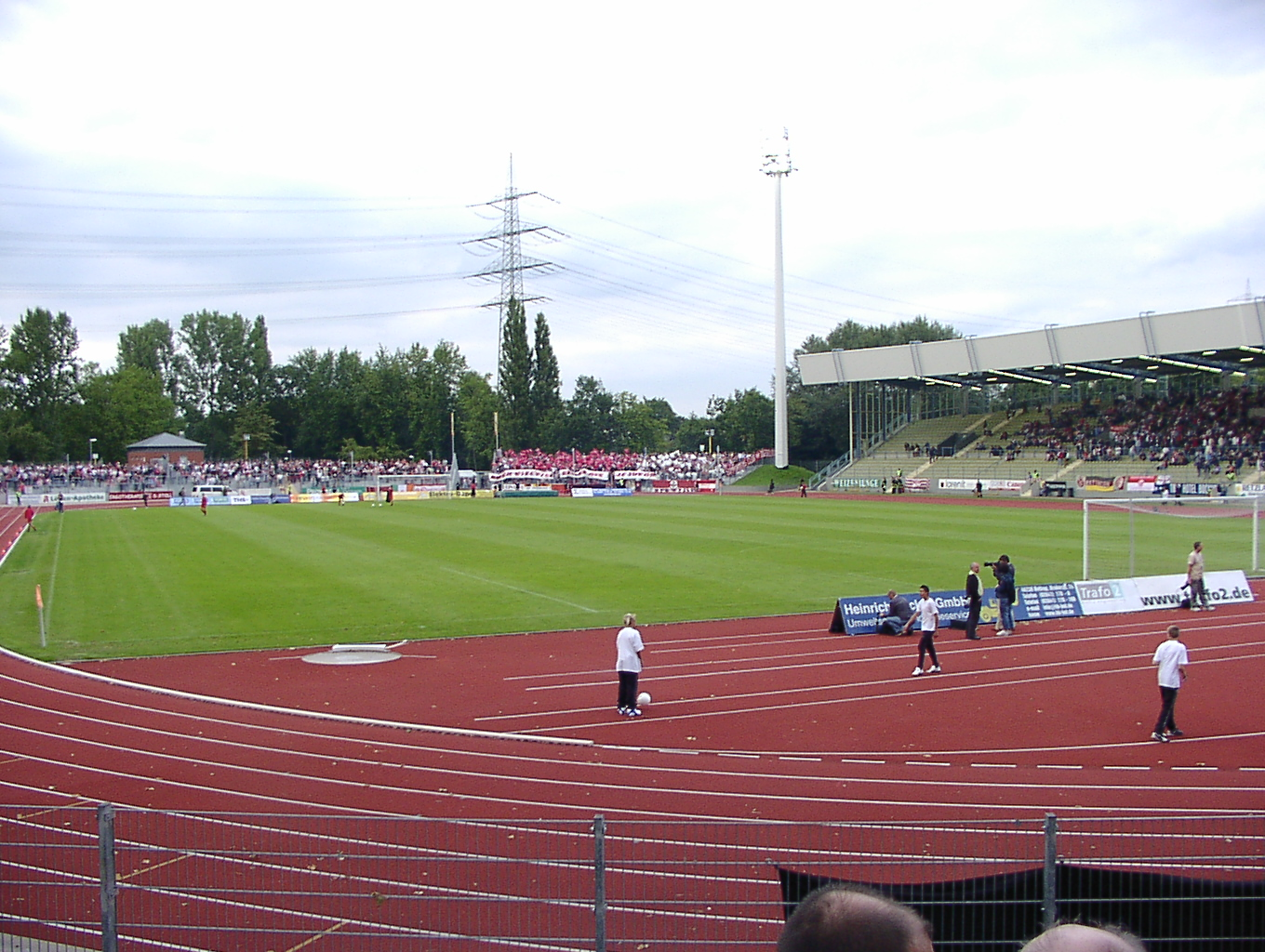
The Lohrheidestadion hosted athletics

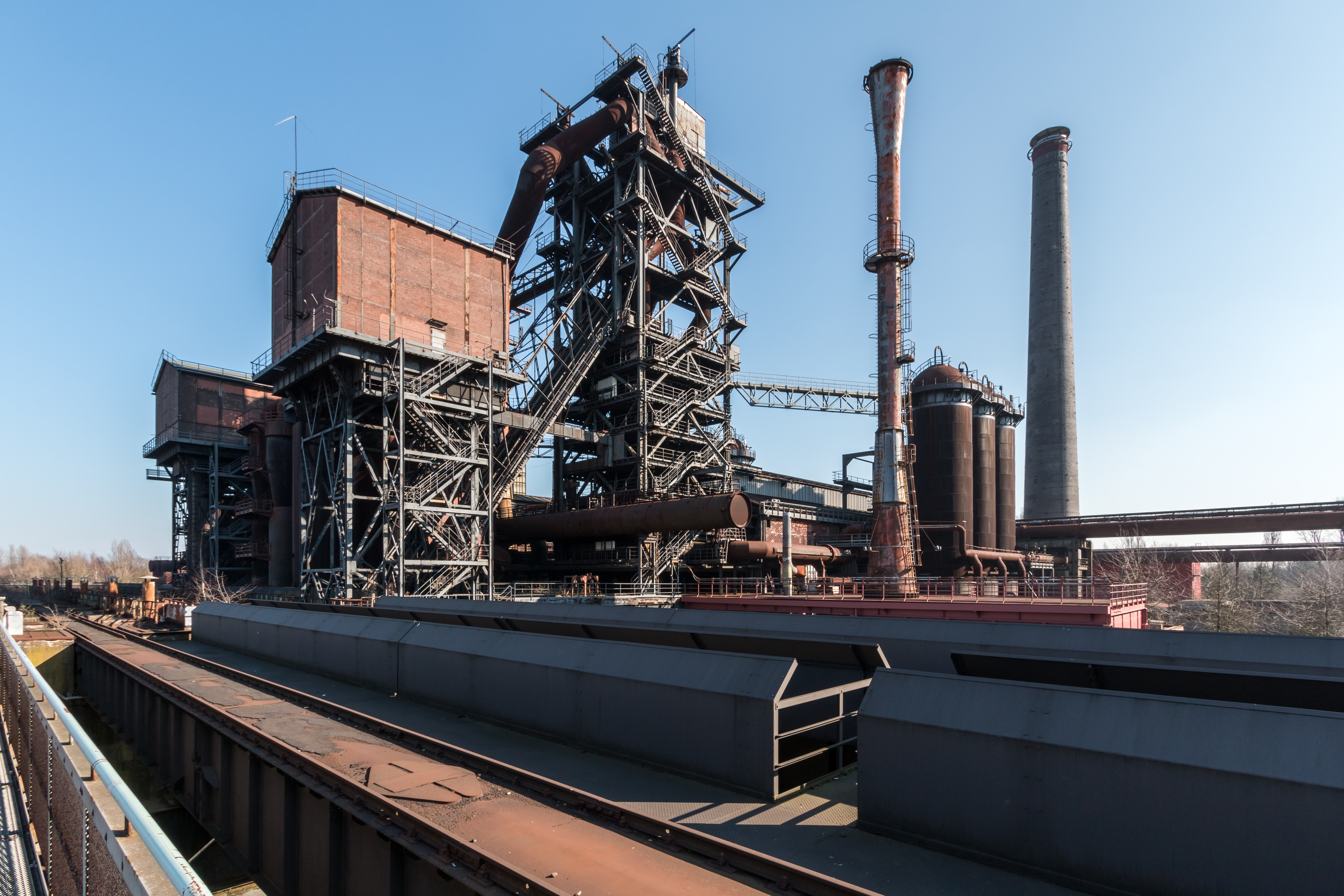
Landschaftspark Duisburg-Nord, the planned venue for the closing ceremony

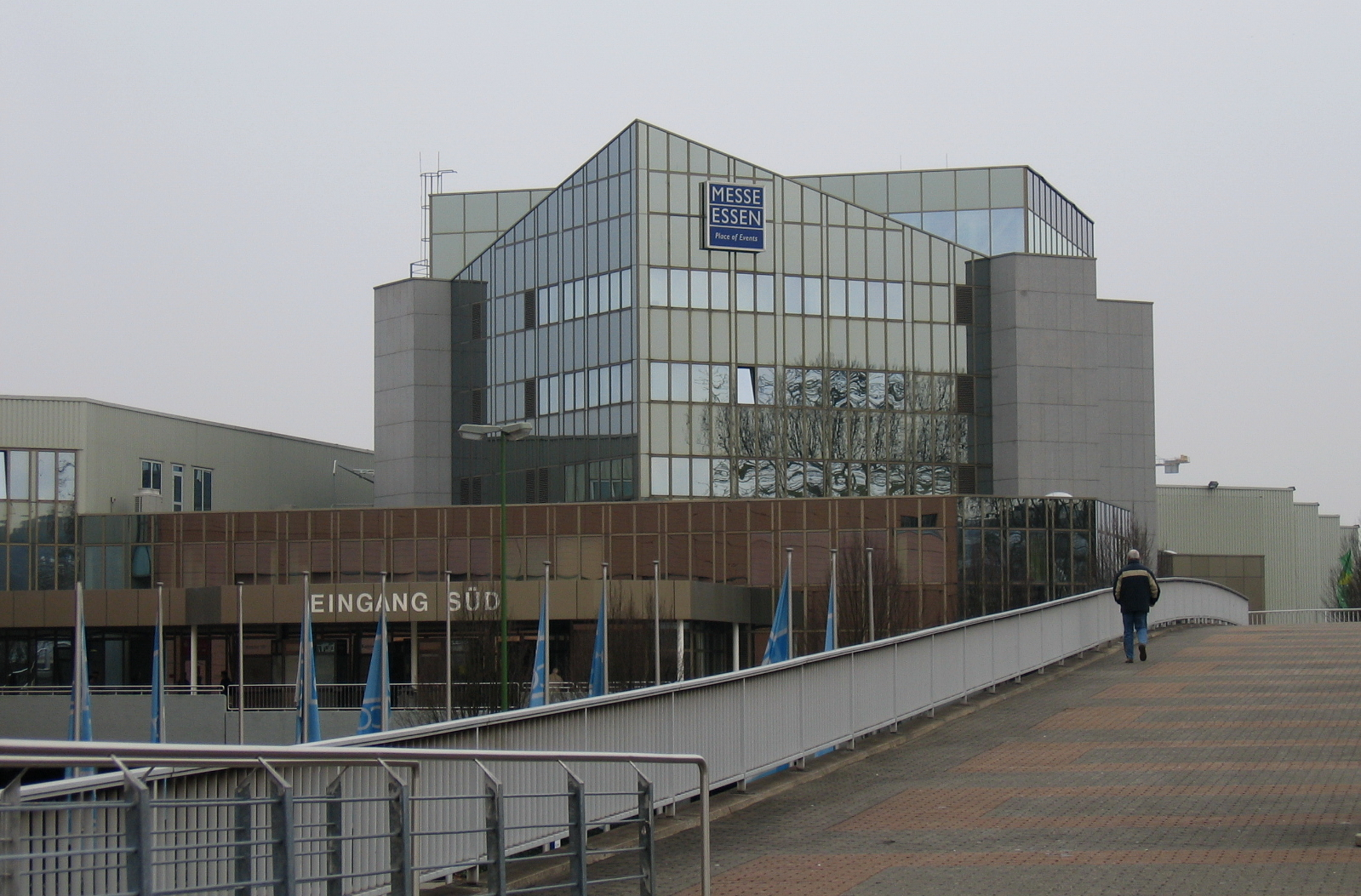
Messe Essen hosted five sports

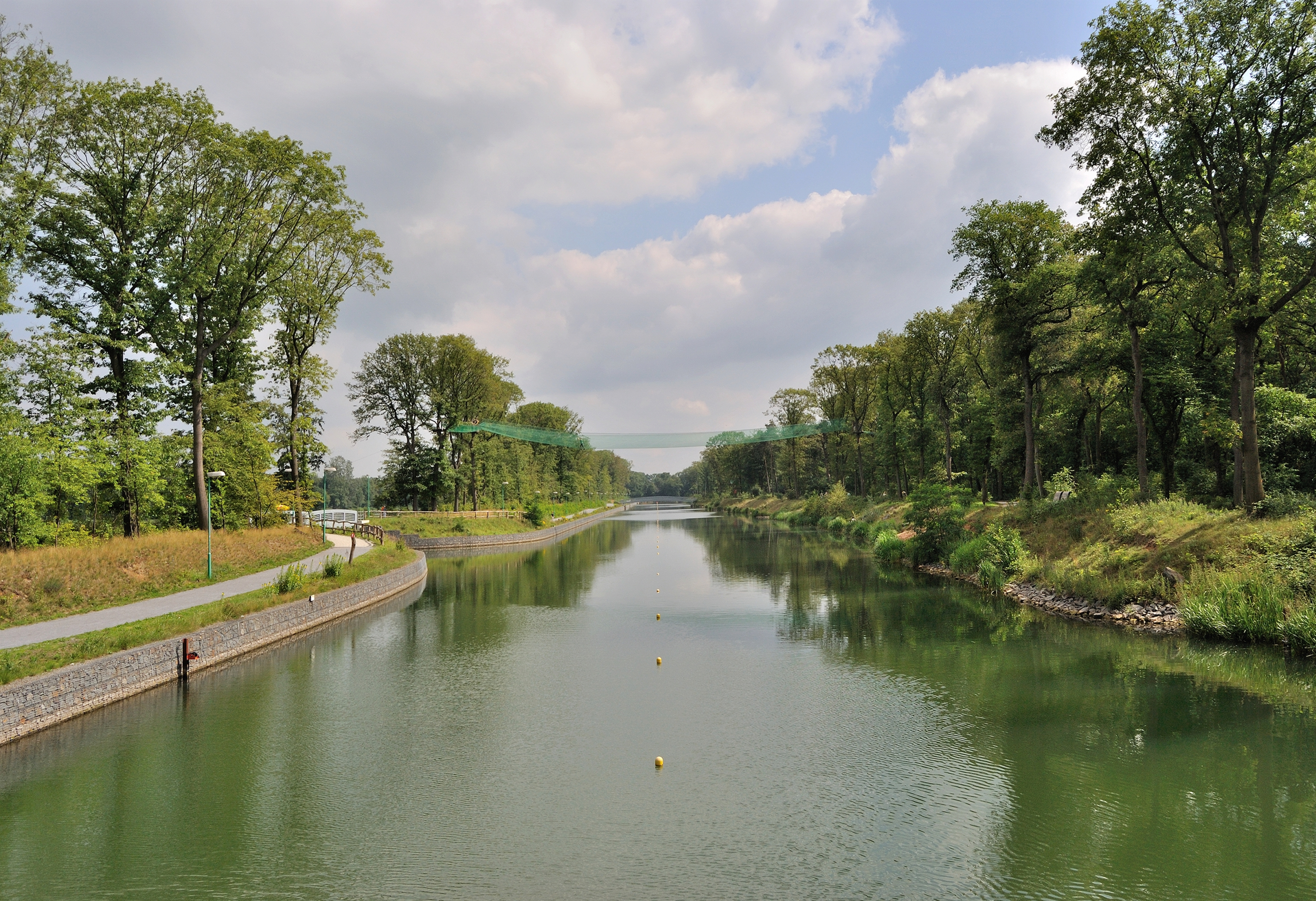
Duisburg Sport Park, the venue for beach volleyball

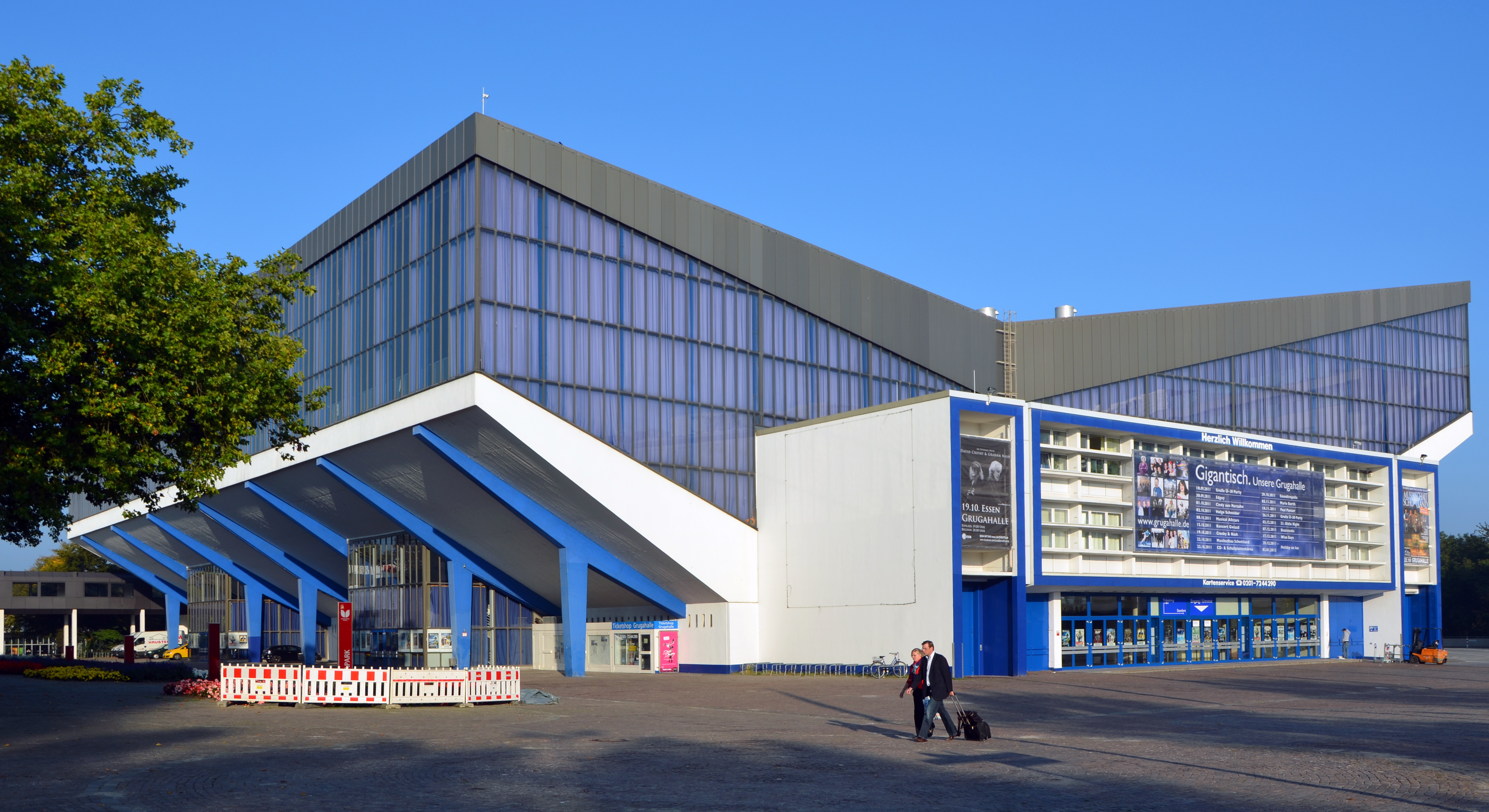
Grugahalle, the main venue for the basketball tournament

==== North Rhine-Westphalia ====
Venue	City	Sports	Capacity
Lohrheidestadion	Bochum	Athletics	16,223
Jahrhunderthalle	Bochum	Basketball (3x3, wheelchair 3x3)	TBA
MSV-Arena	Duisburg	Opening ceremony	31,514
Landschaftspark Duisburg-Nord	Duisburg	Closing ceremony	15,000
Wedau	Duisburg	Rowing	TBA
ASC Duisburg	Duisburg	Aquatics (water polo)	5,000
Walter-Schädlich-Halle	Duisburg	Basketball (preliminaries)	800
Sportpark Duisburg	Duisburg	Beach volleyball	1,650
Messe Essen	Essen	Fencing (Hall 5); Gymnastics (artistic (Hall 3), rhythmic (Hall 4)); Judo (Hall 4); Taekwondo (Hall 6); Table tennis (Hall 1)	TBA (hall 1); TBA (Hall 3); TBA (Hall 4); TBA (Hall 5); TBA (Hall 6)
Grugahalle	Essen	Basketball (finals)	7,700
Essen Tennis Club	Essen	Tennis	5,000
Sporthalle Am Hallo	Essen	Basketball (preliminaries)	2,500
Sportpark Am Hallo Stadion	Essen	Archery (preliminaries)	3,800
Zollverein Coal Mine Industrial Complex	Essen	Archery (finals)	TBA
Ischelandhalle	Hagen	Basketball (preliminaries)	3,145
Westenergie Sporthalle	Mülheim	Badminton	4,000

==== Berlin ====
Venue	City	Sports	Capacity
Europe SportPark Aquatics Centre	Berlin	Aquatics (swimming, diving)	4,200
Max-Schmeling-Halle	Berlin	Volleyball (finals)	9,200
Sportforum Hohenschönhausen	Berlin	Volleyball (preliminaries)	4,750
Großsporthalle Hämmerlingstraße	Berlin	Volleyball (preliminaries)	1,000
Horst-Korber-Sportzentrum	Berlin	Volleyball (preliminaries)	3,500

== The Games ==
=== Sports ===
In addition to the 15 compulsory sports, up to three optional sports could be chosen, while respecting the infrastructure and local demands. The organizing committee proposed beach volleyball, rowing and 3x3 basketball, along with some Paralympic disciplines (which marked the first Summer World University Games to feature para-athletes and para-sport events, following the introduction of para-sports at the 2025 Winter World University Games), as its optional sports.

This was the first time that 3x3 basketball was part of the World University Summer Games program, while beach volleyball returned since it was last held in 2013, while rowing remained after returning for the 2021 Summer World University Games.

- Aquatics
  - Diving (15)
  - Swimming (42)
  - Water polo (2)
- Archery (10)
- Athletics (51)
- Badminton (6)
- Basketball
  - Basketball (2)
  - 3x3 basketball (2)
  - Wheelchair 3x3 basketball (2)
- Fencing (12)
- Gymnastics
  - Artistic gymnastics (14)
  - Rhythmic gymnastics (8)
- Judo (15)
- Rowing (11)
- Table tennis (7)
- Taekwondo (24)
- Tennis (7)
- Volleyball
  - Beach volleyball (2)
  - Volleyball (2)

=== Schedule ===
All times and dates use Central European Summer Time (UTC+2)

OC	Opening ceremony	●	Event competitions	1	Event finals	CC	Closing ceremony

July		16 Wed	17 Thu	18 Fri	19 Sat	20 Sun	21 Mon	22 Tue	23 Wed	24 Thu	25 Fri	26 Sat	27 Sun	Events
Ceremonies		OC											CC	
Aquatics
Aquatics	Diving		2	2	2	2	1	1	5					15
Aquatics	Swimming		3	5	7	5	6	7	9					42
Aquatics	Water polo		●	●	●	●	●	●	●	●	●	2		2
Archery								●	●	●	6	4		10
Athletics							1	5	5	12	3	11	14	51
Badminton			●	●	●	1		●	●	●	●	5		6
Basketball	Basketball			●	●	●	●	●	●	●	1	1		2
Basketball	3×3 basketball		●	●	●	2								2
Basketball	Wheelchair 3x3 basketball		●	●	●	2								2
Fencing			2	2	2	2	2	2						12
Gymnastics
Gymnastics	Artistic							●	1	1	2	10		14
Gymnastics	Rhythmic		●	2	6									8
Judo									5	4	5	1		15
Rowing											●	●	11	11
Table tennis			●	●	●	2	●	1	2	2				7
Taekwondo			3	2	4	4	4	4	3					24
Tennis			●	●	●	●	●	●	●	●	5	2		7
Volleyball	Beach						●	●	●	●	●	2		2
Volleyball	Indoor	●	●	●	●	●	●	●	1	1				2
Daily medal events		0	10	13	21	20	14	20	31	20	22	38	25	234
Cumulative total		0	10	23	44	64	78	98	129	149	171	209	234	

=== Cultural events ===
As part of the event, festivals were held around three main venues in Bochum (17–20 July), Duisburg, and Essen (both 21–26 July), offering various entertainment during the day and concerts and public viewings in the evening. The festivals took place as the Ruhr Games Festival at the Jahrhunderthalle Bochum, the Summer Park Festival in Grugapark, and the Summer Beach Festival on the Dreieckswiese in Sportpark Duisburg. The concert program includes, among others, Ski Aggu, Querbeat, and Deichkind performed at the closing ceremony.

- Schedule:
1. 2025 FISU World Conference - 17-19 July
2. Beach Festival (Duisburg) - 21-27 July
3. Non-Competition Sports - 25-26 July
4. Park Festival (Essen) 21-26 July
5. Ruhr Games Festival (Bochum) - 17-20 July

== Participating NUSFs ==
The following 113 National University Sporting Federations sent delegations to the 2025 Summer World University Games.

Participating National University Sports Federations
1. Albania
2. Argentina
3. Armenia
4. Australia
5. Austria
6. Azerbaijan
7. Bangladesh
8. Belgium (67)
9. Bhutan
10. Bosnia and Herzegovina
11. Botswana
12. Brazil
13. Bulgaria
14. Burkina Faso
15. Burundi
16. Cambodia
17. Canada
18. Chile
19. China
20. Cameroon
21. Democratic Republic of the Congo
22. Colombia
23. Costa Rica
24. Croatia
25. Cyprus
26. Czech Republic
27. Denmark
28. Ecuador
29. Egypt
30. Estonia (53)
31. Ethiopia
32. Finland
33. France
34. The Gambia
35. Georgia
36. Germany (host)
37. Ghana
38. Great Britain
39. Guatemala
40. Guyana
41. Haiti
42. Honduras
43. Hong Kong
44. Hungary
45. India
46. Individual Neutral Athletes (47)
47. Israel
48. Ireland
49. Italy
50. Jamaica
51. Japan
52. Kazakhstan
53. Kenya
54. Kyrgyzstan
55. South Korea
56. Kosovo
57. Laos
58. Latvia
59. Lebanon
60. Libya
61. Lithuania
62. Luxembourg
63. Macau
64. Malaysia (64)
65. Mali
66. Malta
67. Moldova
68. Mexico
69. Mongolia
70. Netherlands
71. Nepal
72. Nigeria
73. Norway
74. New Zealand
75. Oman
76. Pakistan
77. Paraguay
78. Philippines (34)
79. Poland (228)
80. Portugal
81. Qatar
82. Romania
83. San Marino
84. São Tomé and Príncipe
85. Saudi Arabia
86. Senegal
87. Sierra Leone
88. Singapore
89. Slovakia
90. Slovenia
91. Somalia
92. South Africa
93. Spain
94. Sri Lanka
95. Sweden
96. Switzerland
97. Chinese Taipei (196)
98. Tajikistan
99. Tanzania
100. Thailand
101. Trinidad and Tobago
102. Tunisia
103. Turkey (144)
104. Uganda
105. Ukraine (106)
106. United Arab Emirates
107. United States
108. Uzbekistan
109. Venezuela
110. Vietnam
111. Virgin Islands
112. Zambia
113. Zimbabwe

== Medal table ==
* Host nation (Germany)

Rank	Nation	Gold	Silver	Bronze	Total
1	Japan	34	21	24	79
2	China	30	27	17	74
3	United States	28	27	29	84
4	South Korea	21	9	27	57
5	Italy	14	10	19	43
6	France	12	12	17	41
7	Germany*	11	12	17	40
–	Individual Neutral Athletes	8	8	5	21
8	South Africa	6	5	8	19
9	Turkey	6	5	7	18
10	Chinese Taipei	5	13	7	25
11	Poland	5	11	8	24
12	Australia	5	3	4	12
13	Great Britain	4	8	6	18
14	Uzbekistan	4	4	7	15
15	Ukraine	4	3	5	12
16	Spain	3	7	6	16
17	Switzerland	3	4	3	10
18	Czech Republic	3	2	6	11
19	Lithuania	3	0	4	7
20	India	2	5	5	12
21	Thailand	2	4	4	10
22	Netherlands	2	4	2	8
23	Brazil	2	3	7	12
24	Azerbaijan	2	2	0	4
25	Canada	2	1	8	11
26	Hong Kong	2	1	4	7
27	Finland	2	1	3	6
28	Portugal	2	1	2	5
29	Moldova	2	0	0	2
30	Georgia	1	3	1	5
31	Kenya	1	2	2	5
32	Belgium	1	1	2	4
33	Norway	1	1	1	3
33	Slovakia	1	1	1	3
33	Sweden	1	1	1	3
36	Ireland	1	1	0	2
37	Kazakhstan	1	0	10	11
38	Kyrgyzstan	1	0	1	2
39	Armenia	1	0	0	1
39	Denmark	1	0	0	1
39	Israel	1	0	0	1
39	Luxembourg	1	0	0	1
39	Slovenia	1	0	0	1
44	Hungary	0	10	8	18
45	Croatia	0	2	2	4
46	Tunisia	0	1	2	3
47	Malaysia	0	1	1	2
48	Egypt	0	1	0	1
48	Kosovo	0	1	0	1
48	Latvia	0	1	0	1
48	Virgin Islands	0	1	0	1
52	Romania	0	0	4	4
53	Cyprus	0	0	2	2
53	New Zealand	0	0	2	2
55	Austria	0	0	1	1
55	Colombia	0	0	1	1
55	Mexico	0	0	1	1
55	Mongolia	0	0	1	1
Totals (58 entries)		243	241	305	789

== Concerns and controversies ==
=== Administrative errors by Indian officials ===
On 21 July 2025, 6 of the 12 Indian mixed badminton team players sent were barred from the event. This situation was a result of an error made during the Sports Technical Congress. Following this, the Association Indian Universities (AIU) announced that there had been a series of serious failures and suspended its vice president Baljiet Singh Sekhon, and as consequence, opened an investigation that resulted in the discovery of several flaws ranging from the athlete selection process to the national call-up for the Games.

In addition, the Indian delegation of the same sport also had problems with their uniforms that did not meet the standards required by FISU in which only the players' surnames should be written on their backs and not their full names. Another error on the same kits was in relation to the fact that there was no national symbol of India on their uniforms, which resulted in a fine of €1000 per game. The problem was only corrected a few minutes before the semi-final.

=== Withdrawal of Iranian athletes ===
Originally, the presence of an Iranian delegation was expected. However, due to issues with the athletes' visas, on 14 July 2025, the National Federation of University Sports of Iran officially announced its withdrawal from the event. Since there was not enough time to call up a new team for the men's volleyball tournament, the tournament proceeded with 15 participating teams.

=== Chinese Taipei/Taiwan name medal controversy ===
On 23 July, a scuffle broke out after the Chinese Taipei (Taiwan) team won the silver medal in the men's team Kyorugi. Following the medal ceremony, a letter of congratulation from the Taiwanese minister of education was presented to the athletes by a Chinese Taipei team sports official, which drew the attention of two representatives from the China Student Sports Federation who tried to snatch the message. Other Taiwanese sports officials intervene by formed a barrier around the group, leading to physical shoving and verbal confrontation between the two sides. Taiwan's President Lai Ching-te, Premier Cho Jung-tai, and major political parties, including the Kuomintang and Taiwan People's Party, all publicly condemned the actions of the Chinese delegation. The director-general of the Sports Administration, Cheng Shih-chung emphasized that the message presentation was a legitimate expression in a democratic society and was not restricted by Olympic naming conventions.

China's official media Xinhua News Agency issued a statement from the China Students Sports Federation in the early morning of July 25, pointing out that "Taiwan violated the Nagoya Protocol and the regulations of FISU", "Chinese official did not seize, but only verified Taiwan document", "Taiwan personnel took the lead in pushing, resulting in injuries to Chinese official", "FISU fully supported China's position and summoned the head of the Chinese Taipei delegation to stop the violation", accusing DPP of political manipulation for the Great Recall vote on July 26. Similar behavior occurred later, but a non-Chinese official went to verify the letter. At the closing ceremony FISU president Leonz Eder said "We call for global solidarity and peace, Oppose those who only care about personal interests, Acting without regard for the well-being of all mankind", might be alluding this incident.

== See also ==
- 2025 Winter World University Games, held in Turin, Italy
- 1989 Summer Universiade, hosted by the same region
- 1993 Summer Universiade, a similar host concept
- 1997 Summer Universiade, a similar host concept
- 1999 Summer Universiade, a similar host concept
- 2027 Summer World University Games, a similar host concept
- 2029 Summer World University Games, a similar host concept
