= 2022 World Taekwondo Championships – Men's bantamweight =

Taekwondo competitions

Men's bantamweight at the 2022 World Championships
- Venue: Centro Acuático CODE Metropolitano
- Dates: 18 November 2022
- Competitors: 55 from 54 nations

Medalists
gold medal	Liang Yushuai	China
silver medal	Niyaz Pulatov	Uzbekistan
bronze medal	Zaid Al-Halawani	Jordan
bronze medal	Joan Jorquera	Spain

The men's bantamweight is a competition featured at the 2022 World Taekwondo Championships, and was held at the Acuático Code Metropolitano in Guadalajara, Mexico on 18 November 2022. Bantamweights were limited to a maximum of 63 kilograms in body mass.

== Results ==
Legend

- DQ — Won by disqualification
- P — Won by punitive declaration

=== Finals ===
Semifinals				Final
Zaid Al-Halawani (JOR)	1	8
Liang Yushuai (CHN)	4	13		Liang Yushuai (CHN)	6	7
Niyaz Pulatov (UZB)	6	5	13	Niyaz Pulatov (UZB)	2	5
Joan Jorquera (ESP)	9	0	2

=== Top half ===
==== Section 1 ====
Round of 64
Ehsan Naghibzadeh (RTA)	9	6
Nicalas Fernandes (CPV)	4	2
Tobias Hyttel (DEN)	14	5	16
José Nieto (ECU)	4	5	11
~~Mohamed Rkiza (GEQ)~~
Volodymyr Bystrov (UKR)	D	Q
~~Stephen Obonyo (KEN)~~
Novak Stanić (SRB)	D	Q
Luis de Jesús (PUR)	6	16
Kaito Iwaki (JPN)	15	16

Round of 32
Zaid Al-Halawani (JOR)	7	9^{P}
Ehsan Naghibzadeh (RTA)	3	0
Tobias Hyttel (DEN)	2	5
Volodymyr Bystrov (UKR)	3	6
Souleyman Alaphilippe (FRA)	12	9
Novak Stanić (SRB)	0	3
Kaito Iwaki (JPN)	1	18	4
Braven Park (CAN)	8	9	8

Round of 16
Zaid Al-Halawani (JOR)	16	6	12
Volodymyr Bystrov (UKR)	6	7	7
Souleyman Alaphilippe (FRA)	5	12^{P}	11
Braven Park (CAN)	5	10	9

Quarterfinals
Zaid Al-Halawani (JOR)	3	10	15
Souleyman Alaphilippe (FRA)	5	10	12

==== Section 2 ====
Round of 64
~~Johan Robles (NCA)~~	D	Q
~~Maman Mansour Chipkao (NIG)~~	D	Q
Kim Tae-yong (KOR)	14	7
Enkhboldyn Buyanshagai (MGL)	8	2
Jamal Arnhem (SUR)	3	0
Lucas Guzmán (ARG)	14	8
Imran Özkaya (GER)	12	13
Omar Hantoli (PLE)	7	3
Fred Pace (AUS)	0	0
Liang Yushuai (CHN)	13	12
Evangelos Nikolaou (GRE)	D	Q
~~Selasi Damalie (GHA)~~

Round of 32
Gabriel Fabre (BRA)
Bye
Kim Tae-yong (KOR)	6	14
Lucas Guzmán (ARG)	5	2
Imran Özkaya (GER)	6	0	8
Liang Yushuai (CHN)	5	12	9
Evangelos Nikolaou (GRE)	4	2
Carlos Navarro (MEX)	5	10

Round of 16
Gabriel Fabre (BRA)	4	11	4
Kim Tae-yong (KOR)	7	4	10
Liang Yushuai (CHN)	12	10
Carlos Navarro (MEX)	5	5

Quarterfinals
Kim Tae-yong (KOR)	1	8
Liang Yushuai (CHN)	4	12

=== Bottom half ===
==== Section 3 ====
Round of 64
Matin Rezaei (IRI)	15	11
Jhon Garrido (COL)	11	11
Niyaz Pulatov (UZB)	10	12
Hamid Reza Sadri (AZE)	4	0
Josh Tobin (GBR)	0	2
Ahmed Nassar (EGY)	3	13
Jaouad Achab (BEL)	9	8
Yassine El-Barhoumi (TUN)	0	1
Kamran Nuradinov (KAZ)	D	Q
~~Juirdo Cani (ALB)~~
Ioannis Pilavakis (CYP)	8	3
Chalinda Liyanage (SRI)	10	6

Round of 32
Hakan Reçber (TUR)	11	3	7
Matin Rezaei (IRI)	9	4	15
Niyaz Pulatov (UZB)	4	7
Ahmed Nassar (EGY)	2	4
Jaouad Achab (BEL)	11	10
Kamran Nuradinov (KAZ)	2	8
Chalinda Liyanage (SRI)	2	0
Lovre Brečić (CRO)	14	13

Round of 16
Matin Rezaei (IRI)	2	11	9
Niyaz Pulatov (UZB)	7	5	11
Jaouad Achab (BEL)	4	1
Lovre Brečić (CRO)	6	13

Quarterfinals
Niyaz Pulatov (UZB)	7	7
Lovre Brečić (CRO)	5	6

==== Section 4 ====
Round of 64
Ben Younouss Konaté (CIV)	9	3	3
Egor Rogozhine (ISR)	5	11	1
Niko Saarinen (FIN)	1	3	1
Joseph Chua (PHI)	7	0	3
Maikol Rodriguez (USA)	7	7
Abdelbasset Wasfi (MAR)	6	4
Luisito Pié (DOM)	2	0
Séverin Ndong Obame (GAB)	5	7
Pan Kuei-en (TPE)	4	1
Felipe Olivero (CHI)	7	5
Muhammad Bassam Raihan (INA)	4	13
Jourde Klaber (ARU)	0	4

Round of 32
Dennis Baretta (ITA)	6	3	6
Ben Younouss Konaté (CIV)	3	4	6
Joseph Chua (PHI)	5	11
Maikol Rodriguez (USA)	3	5
Séverin Ndong Obame (GAB)	1	5	1
Felipe Olivero (CHI)	7	4	4
Muhammad Bassam Raihan (INA)	2	7
Joan Jorquera (ESP)	7	16

Round of 16
Dennis Baretta (ITA)	8	0	7
Joseph Chua (PHI)	0	5	11
Felipe Olivero (CHI)	1	9
Joan Jorquera (ESP)	2	13

Quarterfinals
Joseph Chua (PHI)	2	2
Joan Jorquera (ESP)	8	10
