= 2023 World Taekwondo Championships – Men's bantamweight =

Taekwondo competitions

Men's bantamweight at the 2023 World Championships
- Venue: Baku Crystal Hall
- Dates: 1 June 2023
- Competitors: 65 from 60 nations

Medalists
gold medal	Hakan Reçber	Turkey
silver medal	Banlung Tubtimdang	Thailand
bronze medal	Carlos Navarro	Mexico
bronze medal	Joan Jorquera	Spain

The men's bantamweight is a competition featured at the 2023 World Taekwondo Championships, and was held at the Baku Crystal Hall in Baku, Azerbaijan on 1 June 2023. Bantamweights were limited to a maximum of 63 kilograms in body mass.

== Results ==
Legend

- DQ — Won by disqualification
- P — Won by punitive declaration

=== Finals ===
Quarterfinals
Liang Yushuai (CHN)	5	5	9
Hakan Reçber (TUR)	3	7	12
Carlos Navarro (MEX)	12	6	8
Tobias Hyttel (DEN)	2	8	8
Joan Jorquera (ESP)	6	16
Lovre Brečić (CRO)	3	12
Souleyman Alaphilippe (FRA)	2	6	9
Banlung Tubtimdang (THA)	8	6	10

Semifinals
Hakan Reçber (TUR)	10	11
Carlos Navarro (MEX)	5	9
Joan Jorquera (ESP)	3	7
Banlung Tubtimdang (THA)	9	9

Final
Hakan Reçber (TUR)	7	5	6
Banlung Tubtimdang (THA)	0	6	2

=== Top half ===
==== Section 1 ====
Round of 128
Keanu Niitmets (EST)	12	4
Jonathan Bouassa (CGO)	15	12

Round of 64
Liang Yushuai (CHN)	13	12
Jonathan Bouassa (CGO)	0	0
Nurbek Gazez (KAZ)	14	13
Eduardo Baretta (BRA)	5	4
Hsu Hao-yu (TPE)	18	13
Hassan Al-Mesmari (UAE)	4	0
Baiastan Ryskulov (KGZ)	1	0
Novak Stanić (SRB)	13	12

Round of 32
Liang Yushuai (CHN)	11	6
Nurbek Gazez (KAZ)	5	5
Hsu Hao-yu (TPE)	15	13
Novak Stanić (SRB)	5	1

Round of 16
Liang Yushuai (CHN)	5	0	7
Hsu Hao-yu (TPE)	2	12	7

==== Section 2 ====
Round of 128

Round of 64
Dennis Baretta (ITA)	18	17
Ian Belén (PUR)	5	4
Ajay Kumar (IND)	8	3
Kenneth Buenavides (USA)	14	5
Ralph Hneineh (LBN)	1	10	12
Toshitaka Maeda (JPN)	7	10	5
~~Alisina Azizi (RTA)~~
Hakan Reçber (TUR)	D	Q

Round of 32
Dennis Baretta (ITA)	6	13
Kenneth Buenavides (USA)	1	4
Ralph Hneineh (LBN)	3	10
Hakan Reçber (TUR)	10	12

Round of 16
Dennis Baretta (ITA)	4	4
Hakan Reçber (TUR)	6	7

==== Section 3 ====
Round of 128

Round of 64
Abdelbasset Wasfi (MAR)	5	8
Hadi Tiran (RTA)	5	3
Linus Vesterlund (SWE)	3	5	3
Maman Mansour Chipkaou (NIG)	10	2	17
Yohandri Granado (VEN)	7	6	9
Marios Tsiaousis (GRE)	4	8	5
Yehya Al-Ghotani (RTA)	0	6
Carlos Navarro (MEX)	14	12

Round of 32
Abdelbasset Wasfi (MAR)	10	4	1
Maman Mansour Chipkaou (NIG)	8	8	13
Yohandri Granado (VEN)	0	0
Carlos Navarro (MEX)	5	6

Round of 16
Maman Mansour Chipkaou (NIG)	7	2
Carlos Navarro (MEX)	8	15

==== Section 4 ====
Round of 128

Round of 64
Tobias Hyttel (DEN)	10	10
Arnis Agushi (KOS)	7	6
Gobinda Bahadur Ale (NEP)	7	8
Denis Dimitrov (BUL)	11	18^{P}
Bocar Diop (SEN)	6	5
Zakariya Ghali (KSA)	6	16
Alfredo Martins (POR)	5	1
Khanoghlan Karimov (AZE)	15^{P}	13

Round of 32
Tobias Hyttel (DEN)	20	17^{P}
Denis Dimitrov (BUL)	16	6
Zakariya Ghali (KSA)	11	8^{P}	14
Khanoghlan Karimov (AZE)	20	13	20

Round of 16
Tobias Hyttel (DEN)	9	12
Khanoghlan Karimov (AZE)	8	7

=== Bottom half ===
==== Section 5 ====
Round of 128

Round of 64
Joan Jorquera (ESP)	13	13
Samuel Tarini (SMR)	0	1
Dashdavaagiin Chinzorig (MGL)	10	2	7
Jhon Garrido (COL)	3	4	5
Farès Boujemai (TUN)	3	7	2
Bekhruzbek Isaev (UZB)	10	6	10
Bizhan Sadr Zada (AFG)	4	3
Cristian Olivero (CHI)	5	8

Round of 32
Joan Jorquera (ESP)	4	5	8
Dashdavaagiin Chinzorig (MGL)	6	4	8
Bekhruzbek Isaev (UZB)	9	6	0
Cristian Olivero (CHI)	5	10	12

Round of 16
Joan Jorquera (ESP)	10	5	7
Cristian Olivero (CHI)	2	10	6

==== Section 6 ====
Round of 128

Round of 64
Kim Tae-yong (KOR)	6	6	14
Maksim Bandarevich (AIN)	5	8	3
Ibrahim Đonko (BIH)	5	7	9
Egor Rogozhine (ISR)	6	7	9
Muhammad Arbaz Khan (PAK)	12	12
Séverin Ndong Obame (GAB)	6	0
Bakary Koné (MLI)	4	5
Lovre Brečić (CRO)	10	5

Round of 32
Kim Tae-yong (KOR)	8	13
Egor Rogozhine (ISR)	1	12
Muhammad Arbaz Khan (PAK)	0	0
Lovre Brečić (CRO)	12	13

Round of 16
Kim Tae-yong (KOR)	0	13	9
Lovre Brečić (CRO)	4	6	10

==== Section 7 ====
Round of 128

Round of 64
Souleyman Alaphilippe (FRA)	15	12
Chan Kin Fung (HKG)	3	0
Mikhail Artamonov (AIN)	6	9
Ioannis Pilavakis (CYP)	0	1
Ben Younouss Konaté (CIV)	9	12
José Nieto (ECU)	0	6
Sharif Salim (HUN)	6	9
Iordanis Konstantinidis (GER)	2	7

Round of 32
Souleyman Alaphilippe (FRA)	14	13
Mikhail Artamonov (AIN)	10	10
Ben Younouss Konaté (CIV)	12	10
Sharif Salim (HUN)	2	1

Round of 16
Souleyman Alaphilippe (FRA)	11	17	12^{P}
Ben Younouss Konaté (CIV)	11	6	3

==== Section 8 ====
Round of 128

Round of 64
Farzan Ashourzadeh (IRI)	0	6
Banlung Tubtimdang (THA)	0	8
Matthew Summerfield (AUS)	11	14	16
Juirdo Cani (ALB)	13	12	17
Joseph Chua (PHI)	0	5	4
Shane Britton (CAN)	1	3	8
Tyron Moores-Duffield (SOM)	6	1
Zaid Al-Halawani (JOR)	8^{P}	10

Round of 32
Banlung Tubtimdang (THA)	15	8
Juirdo Cani (ALB)	3	6
Shane Britton (CAN)	3	0
Zaid Al-Halawani (JOR)	14	5

Round of 16
Banlung Tubtimdang (THA)	13	1	10
Zaid Al-Halawani (JOR)	3	3	8
