= 2022 World Taekwondo Championships – Men's featherweight =

Taekwondo competitions

Men's featherweight at the 2022 World Championships
- Venue: Centro Acuático CODE Metropolitano
- Dates: 16 November 2022
- Competitors: 57 from 57 nations

Medalists
gold medal	Kwon Do-yun	South Korea
silver medal	Bradly Sinden	Great Britain
bronze medal	Reza Kalhor	Iran
bronze medal	Javad Aghayev	Azerbaijan

The men's featherweight is a competition featured at the 2022 World Taekwondo Championships, and was held at the Centro Acuático CODE Metropolitano in Guadalajara, Mexico on 16 November 2022. Featherweights were limited to a maximum of 68 kilograms in body mass.

== Results ==
Legend

- DQ — Won by disqualification
- P — Won by punitive declaration

=== Finals ===
Semifinals				Final
Bradly Sinden (GBR)	6	15	16
Reza Kalhor (IRI)	17	8	11	Bradly Sinden (GBR)	4	7
Javad Aghayev (AZE)	6	0	2	Kwon Do-yun (KOR)	5	10
Kwon Do-yun (KOR)	2	0	3

=== Top half ===
==== Section 1 ====
Round of 64
~~Mouhamadou Lo (SEN)~~
Lazar Dragojević (SRB)	D	Q
Théo Lucien (FRA)	2	5	2
Fahad Al-Ramini (PLE)	5	5	1
Tam Ching Nam (HKG)	4	0
Aaron Kobenan (CIV)	16	13
Ali Alian (SWE)	7	13
Alfritz Arevalo (PHI)	0	0
Michele Ceccaroni (SMR)	1	1
Mitko Dzhordzhev (BUL)	11	2
Ferhat Can Kavurat (TUR)	6	15
Moussa Amar Cissé (GAB)	3	6
Henri Bowles (TTO)	1	1
Konstantinos Chamalidis (GRE)	11	13

Round of 32
Bradly Sinden (GBR)	14	7
Lazar Dragojević (SRB)	2	2
Théo Lucien (FRA)	8	7
Aaron Kobenan (CIV)	3	6
Ali Alian (SWE)	3	3
Mitko Dzhordzhev (BUL)	0	2
Ferhat Can Kavurat (TUR)	8	13	5
Konstantinos Chamalidis (GRE)	5	13	3

Round of 16
Bradly Sinden (GBR)	6	7	10
Théo Lucien (FRA)	1	5^{P}	1
Ali Alian (SWE)	1	2
Ferhat Can Kavurat (TUR)	2	4

Quarterfinals
Bradly Sinden (GBR)	6	26
Ferhat Can Kavurat (TUR)	6	18

==== Section 2 ====
Round of 64
~~Bir Bahadur Mahara (NEP)~~
Zinedin Beqaj (MNE)	D	Q
Gabriel Campolina (BRA)	D	Q
~~George Holland (LBR)~~
~~Lawrence Tweasam (GHA)~~
Levente Józsa (HUN)	D	Q
Khalfani Harris (USA)	11	12
Tsagaantsoojiin Bayanbat (MGL)	5	3
Tomáš Sittek (CZE)	3	4	7
Tom Afonczenko (AUS)	1	5	11
~~Ismael Yacouba (NIG)~~
Reza Kalhor (IRI)	D	Q

Round of 32
Bernardo Pié (DOM)	D	Q
~~Zinedin Beqaj (MNE)~~
Gabriel Campolina (BRA)	3	1
Levente Józsa (HUN)	5	2
Khalfani Harris (USA)	2	6
Tom Afonczenko (AUS)	2	3
Reza Kalhor (IRI)	10	17
Iker Casas (MEX)	7	4

Round of 16
Bernardo Pié (DOM)	7	3	8
Levente Józsa (HUN)	6	4	2
Khalfani Harris (USA)	4	13
Reza Kalhor (IRI)	5	15

Quarterfinals
Bernardo Pié (DOM)	7	8
Reza Kalhor (IRI)	14	17

=== Bottom half ===
==== Section 3 ====
Round of 64
Adrián Benítez (PUR)	4	2	8
Federico González (URU)	3	5	4
Javad Aghayev (AZE)	5	8
Chaichon Cho (THA)	3	5
Takahito Maeda (JPN)	4	8
Mateusz Szczęsnowski (POL)	12	14
Ignacio Morales (CHI)	8	5
Sean Laloan (HAI)	2	1
Rabbin Vicente (HON)	0	0
Eyad Barakat (EGY)	13	12
Lin Wenye (CHN)	8	7
Mohamed Fofana (MLI)	5	1

Round of 32
Ulugbek Rashitov (UZB)	14	10
Adrián Benítez (PUR)	0	1
Javad Aghayev (AZE)	4	11
Mateusz Szczęsnowski (POL)	4	11
Ignacio Morales (CHI)	0	2	6
Eyad Barakat (EGY)	1	0	6
Lin Wenye (CHN)	1	9
Zaid Kareem (JOR)	9	13

Round of 16
Ulugbek Rashitov (UZB)	0	4	5
Javad Aghayev (AZE)	0	2	6
Eyad Barakat (EGY)	2	1
Zaid Kareem (JOR)	3	4

Quarterfinals
Javad Aghayev (AZE)	2	2	5
Zaid Kareem (JOR)	1	8	3

==== Section 4 ====
Round of 64
Warrick Galland (SUI)	0	0
Faical Saidi (MAR)	3	1
Hervan Nkogho-Mengue (CAN)	3	7
Chiu Yi-jui (TPE)	10	15
~~Hussein Imad (IRQ)~~
Leon Glasnović (CRO)	D	Q
Otto Jørgensen (DEN)	8	11
Almat Kozhakhmet (KAZ)	4	8
Saneliso Masuku (SWZ)	0	0
David Paz (COL)	12	10
Beka Kavtaradze (GEO)	7	7	0
Kwon Do-yun (KOR)	6	7	2

Round of 32
Nimrod Krivishkiy (ISR)	1	7
Faical Saidi (MAR)	6	8
Chiu Yi-jui (TPE)	8	1	16
Leon Glasnović (CRO)	5	5	4
Otto Jørgensen (DEN)	2	6	2
David Paz (COL)	14	4	1
Kwon Do-yun (KOR)	7	9
Javier Pérez (ESP)	6	8

Round of 16
Faical Saidi (MAR)	4	6
Chiu Yi-jui (TPE)	8	7
Otto Jørgensen (DEN)	2	11
Kwon Do-yun (KOR)	8	11

Quarterfinals
Chiu Yi-jui (TPE)	12	3
Kwon Do-yun (KOR)	14	7
