= 2023 World Taekwondo Championships – Men's featherweight =

Taekwondo competitions

Men's featherweight at the 2023 World Championships
- Venue: Baku Crystal Hall
- Dates: 29 May 2023
- Competitors: 73 from 71 nations

Medalists
gold medal	Bradly Sinden	Great Britain
silver medal	Jin Ho-jun	South Korea
bronze medal	Matin Rezaei	Iran
bronze medal	Ulugbek Rashitov	Uzbekistan

The men's featherweight is a competition featured at the 2023 World Taekwondo Championships, and was held at the Baku Crystal Hall in Baku, Azerbaijan on 29 May 2023. Featherweights were limited to a maximum of 68 kilograms in body mass.

Bradly Sinden of Great Britain won the gold medal after beating Jin Ho-jun from South Korea in the final.

== Results ==
Legend

- P — Won by punitive declaration
- W — Won by withdrawal

=== Finals ===
Quarterfinals
Bradly Sinden (GBR)	6	9
Eyad Barakat (EGY)	4	3
Matin Rezaei (IRI)	10	9	12
Xiao Chenming (CHN)	8	9	11
Ulugbek Rashitov (UZB)	4	8
Konstantinos Chamalidis (GRE)	2	5
Jin Ho-jun (KOR)	3	2	6
Zaid Kareem (JOR)	6	1	4

Semifinals
Bradly Sinden (GBR)	15	21
Matin Rezaei (IRI)	13	5
Ulugbek Rashitov (UZB)	3	1	1
Jin Ho-jun (KOR)	1	2	2

Final
Bradly Sinden (GBR)	3	16
Jin Ho-jun (KOR)	2	9

=== Top half ===
==== Section 1 ====
Round of 128
Lo Wai Fung (HKG)	11	3
Ilia Danilov (AIN)	12	15

Round of 64
Bradly Sinden (GBR)	9	1	15
Ilia Danilov (AIN)	3	13	5
Arven Alcantara (PHI)	3	8	9
Egers Aliu (ALB)	7	4	7
Théo Lucien (FRA)	17	14
Diego Montúfar (GUA)	4	2
Matija Črep (CRO)	7	8
Aaron Kobenan (CIV)	6	5

Round of 32
Bradly Sinden (GBR)	13	24
Arven Alcantara (PHI)	10	11
Théo Lucien (FRA)	8	9
Matija Črep (CRO)	6	8

Round of 16
Bradly Sinden (GBR)	6	14
Théo Lucien (FRA)	4	1

==== Section 2 ====
Round of 128
Habib Samaha (LBN)	W
Ali Reza Abbasi (AFG)
Taeku Park (CAN)	13	13
Tetaake Namai (KIR)	0	0

Round of 64
Ali Alian (SWE)	19	2	12
Habib Samaha (LBN)	13	8	0
Warrick Galland (SUI)	1	0
Ibrahim Maïga (BUR)	7	12
Eyad Barakat (EGY)	6	1	7
Imran Özkaya (GER)	4	2	6
Taeku Park (CAN)	0	6
Ignacio Morales (CHI)	7	7

Round of 32
Ali Alian (SWE)	13	9
Ibrahim Maïga (BUR)	6	7
Eyad Barakat (EGY)	2	2
Ignacio Morales (CHI)	0	1

Round of 16
Ali Alian (SWE)	2	0
Eyad Barakat (EGY)	3	0

==== Section 3 ====
Round of 128
Mohammad Shalan (QAT)	0	0
José Luis Acuña (ARG)	9	12

Round of 64
Javier Pérez (ESP)	8	12
José Luis Acuña (ARG)	2	6
Moussa Amar Cissé (GAB)	5	1
Eldar Birimbay (KAZ)	12	3
Matin Rezaei (IRI)	13	17	13
Prithvi Raj Chauhan (IND)	6	8^{P}	1
Edward Holland (SLE)	0	3
João Victor Diniz (BRA)	5	15

Round of 32
Javier Pérez (ESP)	9	12
Eldar Birimbay (KAZ)	3	3
Matin Rezaei (IRI)	6	16
João Victor Diniz (BRA)	5	14

Round of 16
Javier Pérez (ESP)	2	3	8
Matin Rezaei (IRI)	4	2	8

==== Section 4 ====
Round of 128
Solomon Tefera (ETH)	9	4	2
Eldar Kurmanaliev (KGZ)	8	9	9

Round of 64
Levente Józsa (HUN)	11	8
Renato Pereira (POR)	5	6
Arber Azemi (KOS)	5	0
David Paz (COL)	17	8
Chiu Yi-jui (TPE)	7	9	6
Xiao Chenming (CHN)	11	0	12
Eldar Kurmanaliev (KGZ)	1	17
Javad Aghayev (AZE)	13	22^{P}

Round of 32
Levente Józsa (HUN)	2	5
David Paz (COL)	0	1
Xiao Chenming (CHN)	7	7	10
Javad Aghayev (AZE)	4	9	10

Round of 16
Levente Józsa (HUN)	6	2	16
Xiao Chenming (CHN)	5	10	14^{P}

=== Bottom half ===
==== Section 5 ====
Round of 128
Wilfried Mekontchou (CMR)	0	3
Joseph Phiri (MAW)	12	8

Round of 64
Ulugbek Rashitov (UZB)	12	12
Joseph Phiri (MAW)	0	0
Jasser Aouini (TUN)	6	11
Beka Kavtaradze (GEO)	5	2
Ferhat Can Kavurat (TUR)	13	12
Michele Ceccaroni (SMR)	0	0
Ali Radwan (AIN)	1	4	1
Otto Jørgensen (DEN)	6	2	4

Round of 32
Ulugbek Rashitov (UZB)	10	6
Jasser Aouini (TUN)	6	1
Ferhat Can Kavurat (TUR)	16	16
Otto Jørgensen (DEN)	9	3

Round of 16
Ulugbek Rashitov (UZB)	17	8
Ferhat Can Kavurat (TUR)	7	3

==== Section 6 ====
Round of 128
Hasanein Khafaji (IRQ)	7	7
Romet Akel (EST)	10	11

Round of 64
Konstantinos Chamalidis (GRE)	14	14
Miroslav Frgolec (SVK)	2	1
Fahad Al-Ramini (PLE)	8	9	7
Mitko Dzhordzhev (BUL)	10	7	13
Zinedin Beqaj (MNE)	12	10
Mohamed Fofana (MLI)	7	4
Romet Akel (EST)	0	0
Bernardo Pié (DOM)	13	12

Round of 32
Konstantinos Chamalidis (GRE)	9	12
Mitko Dzhordzhev (BUL)	8	6
Zinedin Beqaj (MNE)	7	3
Bernardo Pié (DOM)	9	6

Round of 16
Konstantinos Chamalidis (GRE)	9	5	12
Bernardo Pié (DOM)	0	12	7

==== Section 7 ====
Round of 128
Oliver Largaespada (NCA)	2	2
Muhamed Đonko (BIH)	8	6

Round of 64
Jin Ho-jun (KOR)	13	12
Muhamed Đonko (BIH)	4	5
Alex Ryder (NZL)	2	2
Tom Afonczenko (AUS)	10	10
Iker Casas (MEX)	12	4
Bir Bahadur Mahara (NEP)	3	0
Tsagaantsoojiin Bayanbat (MGL)	13	6
Nimrod Krivishkiy (ISR)	16	15^{P}

Round of 32
Jin Ho-jun (KOR)	2	9
Tom Afonczenko (AUS)	0	3
Iker Casas (MEX)	1	9	9
Nimrod Krivishkiy (ISR)	2	7	7

Round of 16
Jin Ho-jun (KOR)	7	6
Iker Casas (MEX)	5	4

==== Section 8 ====
Round of 128
Mohamed El-Attari (MAR)	10	18
Takato Kato (JPN)	6	14

Round of 64
Khalfani Harris (USA)	12	12
Høgni Kunoy Dávason (FRO)	0	0
Chaichon Cho (THA)	8	8	8
Mateusz Szczęsnowski (POL)	8	9	4
Mouhamadou Lo (SEN)	5	13	6
Adrián Benítez (PUR)	8	4	3
Mohamed El-Attari (MAR)	0	3
Zaid Kareem (JOR)	8	10

Round of 32
Khalfani Harris (USA)	5	10
Chaichon Cho (THA)	0	1
Mouhamadou Lo (SEN)	7^{P}	1	17
Zaid Kareem (JOR)	3	11	17

Round of 16
Khalfani Harris (USA)	1	2
Zaid Kareem (JOR)	5	6
