= 2025 World Taekwondo Championships – Men's featherweight =

Taekwondo competitions

Men's featherweight at the 2025 World Championships
- Venue: Taihu International Expo Center
- Dates: 28 October 2025
- Competitors: 73 from 68 nations

Medalists
gold medal	Banlung Tubtimdang	Thailand
silver medal	Seong Yu-hyeon	South Korea
bronze medal	Matija Črep	Croatia
bronze medal	Maikol Rodriguez	United States

The men's featherweight competition at the 2025 World Taekwondo Championships was held on 28 October 2025 in Taihu International Expo Center, Wuxi, China.

Featherweights were limited to a maximum of 68 kilograms in body mass.

== Results ==
Legend

- P — Won by punitive declaration
- W — Won by withdrawal

=== Finals ===
Quarterfinals
Banlung Tubtimdang (THA)	5	4
Mouhamadou Lo (SEN)	4	4
Matija Črep (CRO)	4	13
Cristián Olivero (CHI)	3	9
Diyorbek Tukhliboev (UZB)	4	0	6
Maikol Rodriguez (USA)	3	7	10
Seong Yu-hyeon (KOR)	4	14
Théo Lucien (FRA)	3	6

Semifinals
Banlung Tubtimdang (THA)	6	16
Matija Črep (CRO)	4	3
Maikol Rodriguez (USA)	3	8	1
Seong Yu-hyeon (KOR)	6	4	2

Final
Banlung Tubtimdang (THA)	10	7
Seong Yu-hyeon (KOR)	5	1

=== Top half ===
==== Section 1 ====
Round of 128
Bhumesh Maithil (IND)	3	12	4
Najimuldin Birzeeq (LBA)	5	10	5

Round of 64
Banlung Tubtimdang (THA)	5	8
Najimuldin Birzeeq (LBA)	0	0
Ismael Yacouba (NIG)	7	4
Xavier Nikolovski (AUS)	12	4
Damir Shulenov (KAZ)	9	4	13
Nimrod Krivishkiy (ISR)	3	6	10
Felix Zehetner (AUT)	6	5
Leo Speight (ISL)	5	3

Round of 32
Banlung Tubtimdang (THA)	1	14	12
Xavier Nikolovski (AUS)	2	0	0
Damir Shulenov (KAZ)	3	11	2
Felix Zehetner (AUT)	8	0	0

Round of 16
Banlung Tubtimdang (THA)	9	13	10
Damir Shulenov (KAZ)	9	0	9

==== Section 2 ====
Round of 128
Muhammet Rozyýew (TKM)	2	6
Sagun Shrestha (NEP)	4	9
Michel Zeinoun (LBN)	W
Fawaz Abdulreheem (KUW)

Round of 64
Matthew Howell (GBR)	4	11
Sagun Shrestha (NEP)	3	2
Riyad Shiraliyev (AZE)	2	2	0
Mouhamadou Lo (SEN)	1	3	13
Rei Tsuruoka (JPN)	8	14
Edward Holland (SLE)	7	10
Michel Zeinoun (LBN)	0	4
Joan Jorquera (ESP)	13	12

Round of 32
Matthew Howell (GBR)	8	0
Mouhamadou Lo (SEN)	11	0
Rei Tsuruoka (JPN)	1	2
Joan Jorquera (ESP)	5	14

Round of 16
Mouhamadou Lo (SEN)	2	2	4
Joan Jorquera (ESP)	4	2	4

==== Section 3 ====
Round of 128
Brian Cantero (CUB)	12	13
James Pita (VAN)	0	0

Round of 64
João Victor Diniz (BRA)	1	3
Brian Cantero (CUB)	5	11^{P}
Hadi Tiran (TRT)	10	3	2
Muhamed Đonko (BIH)	2	10	9
Fares Boujemai (TUN)	5	12
Diaa Ziad (PLE)	4	3
Niko Myllynen (FIN)	1	2
Matija Črep (CRO)	5	8

Round of 32
Brian Cantero (CUB)	6	8
Muhamed Đonko (BIH)	2	5
Fares Boujemai (TUN)	4	7	7
Matija Črep (CRO)	1	7	11

Round of 16
Brian Cantero (CUB)	7	1
Matija Črep (CRO)	12	10

==== Section 4 ====
Round of 128
Ludovico Iurlaro (ITA)	13	5
Niklas Oguz (NOR)	9	1

Round of 64
Cristián Olivero (CHI)	12	11
Elion Agushi (KOS)	6	2
Ali Alian (SWE)	4	0
Stefan Stamenov (BUL)	4	4
Mohammad Sadegh Dehghani (IRI)	0	12
Sarmat Tcakoev (AIN)	5	16
Ludovico Iurlaro (ITA)	9	3
Diao Lixingjun (CHN)	10	12

Round of 32
Cristián Olivero (CHI)	3	3	9
Stefan Stamenov (BUL)	8	3	2
Sarmat Tcakoev (AIN)	5	5
Diao Lixingjun (CHN)	9	8

Round of 16
Cristián Olivero (CHI)	2	4	8
Diao Lixingjun (CHN)	2	0	6

=== Bottom half ===
==== Section 5 ====
Round of 128
Mário Chipalanga (ANG)	2	4
Ethan Jenkins (CAN)	14	16

Round of 64
Amir Vykov (AIN)	9	10
Ethan Jenkins (CAN)	4	2
Hikmatullah Zain (AFG)	1	3	1
Diyorbek Tukhliboev (UZB)	5	2	2
Lo Wai Fung (HKG)	8	10
Eldar Kurmanaliev (KGZ)	10	12
Tiago Reis (POR)	4	1
Zaid Al-Halawani (JOR)	4	14

Round of 32
Amir Vykov (AIN)	0	2
Diyorbek Tukhliboev (UZB)	2	10
Eldar Kurmanaliev (KGZ)	5	6
Zaid Al-Halawani (JOR)	11	7

Round of 16
Diyorbek Tukhliboev (UZB)	1	5
Zaid Al-Halawani (JOR)	1	1

==== Section 6 ====
Round of 128
Jérémie Landou (GAB)	6	12	15
Wander González (DOM)	15	6	3

Round of 64
Maikol Rodriguez (USA)	6	2	2
Ahmed Bin Qasim (KSA)	0	6	1
Ali Reza Abbasi (TRT)	4	13	7
Tobias Hyttel (DEN)	5	11	7
Jhon Garrido (COL)	8	10
Sekou Coulibaly (LUX)	2	8
Jérémie Landou (GAB)	5	13	7
Ibrahim Maïga (BUR)	11	0	16

Round of 32
Maikol Rodriguez (USA)	7	8
Tobias Hyttel (DEN)	0	1
Jhon Garrido (COL)	3	3	9
Ibrahim Maïga (BUR)	1	8	14

Round of 16
Maikol Rodriguez (USA)	8	7	9^{P}
Ibrahim Maïga (BUR)	7	11	4

==== Section 7 ====
Round of 128
Seong Yu-hyeon (KOR)	17	13
Samero Doebe (SUR)	2	1

Round of 64
Berkay Erer (TUR)	8	3
Seong Yu-hyeon (KOR)	9	7
Alejandro Ávila (MEX)	7	3	1
Mateusz Chrzanowski (POL)	6	5	11
José Luis Acuña (ARG)	8	5
Enis Calik (GER)	4	3
Esrom Neyi (TRT)	1	1
Žarko Krajišnik (SRB)	10	2

Round of 32
Seong Yu-hyeon (KOR)	8	7
Mateusz Chrzanowski (POL)	6	5
José Luis Acuña (ARG)	7	5	3
Žarko Krajišnik (SRB)	6	5	10

Round of 16
Seong Yu-hyeon (KOR)	2	0	6
Žarko Krajišnik (SRB)	4	0	5

==== Section 8 ====
Round of 128
Daniel Cazas (BOL)	3	9
Venilaite Moala (TGA)	2	5

Round of 64
Hsu Hao-yu (TPE)	10	4	2
Matías López (URU)	3	6	4
Nusair Lao (PHI)	2	0
Volodymyr Bystrov (UKR)	4	12
Reda Khomani (MAR)	0	1
Apostolos Panagopoulos (GRE)	10	13
Daniel Cazas (BOL)	3	1
Théo Lucien (FRA)	15	13

Round of 32
Matías López (URU)	4	4
Volodymyr Bystrov (UKR)	6	10
Apostolos Panagopoulos (GRE)	7	0	1
Théo Lucien (FRA)	3	0	11

Round of 16
Volodymyr Bystrov (UKR)	4	1
Théo Lucien (FRA)	4	12
