= Taekwondo at the 2022 Asian Games – Men's 63 kg =

Taekwondo competition

Men's 63 kg at the 2022 Asian Games
- Venue: Lin'an Sports and Culture Centre
- Date: 26 September 2023
- Competitors: 23 from 23 nations

Medalists
gold medal	Banlung Tubtimdang	Thailand
silver medal	Alireza Hosseinpour	Iran
bronze medal	Liang Yushuai	China
bronze medal	Zaid Al-Halawani	Jordan

The men's 63 kilograms event at the 2022 Asian Games took place on 26 September 2023 at Lin'an Sports and Culture Centre, Hangzhou, China.

== Schedule ==
All times are China Standard Time (UTC+08:00)

Date	Time	Event
Tuesday, 26 September 2023	09:00	Round of 32
Tuesday, 26 September 2023	09:00	Round of 16
Tuesday, 26 September 2023	14:00	Quarterfinals
Tuesday, 26 September 2023	14:00	Semifinals
Tuesday, 26 September 2023	14:00	Gold medal contest

== Results ==
Legend

- P — Won by punitive declaration
- R — Won by referee stop contest

=== Final ===
Gold medal contest
Banlung Tubtimdang (THA)	7	11
Alireza Hosseinpour (IRI)	6	7

=== Top half ===
Round of 32
Bizhan Sadr Zada (AFG)	11	5	15
Mahmadjon Sunatov (TJK)	2	6	3
Phongsak Dengpaseuth (LAO)	2	12
Dashdavaagiin Chinzorig (MGL)	15	24
Gobinda Bahadur Ale (NEP)	5^{R}
José da Costa Silva (TLS)	1

Round of 16
Liang Yushuai (CHN)	7	9
Bizhan Sadr Zada (AFG)	0	3
Nurbek Gazez (KAZ)	16	11^{R}
Joseph Chua (PHI)	4	4
Hsu Hao-yu (TPE)	4	1	6
Dashdavaagiin Chinzorig (MGL)	2	2	6
Gobinda Bahadur Ale (NEP)	12	7
Banlung Tubtimdang (THA)	14	8

Quarterfinals
Liang Yushuai (CHN)	5	16
Nurbek Gazez (KAZ)	1	2
Hsu Hao-yu (TPE)	7	12	15
Banlung Tubtimdang (THA)	13	3	18

Semifinals
Liang Yushuai (CHN)	4	9
Banlung Tubtimdang (THA)	12	15

=== Bottom half ===
Round of 32
Lee Gi-beom (KOR)	5	12
Phạm Đăng Quang (VIE)	2	0
Muhammad Bassam Raihan (INA)	3	0
Alireza Hosseinpour (IRI)	10	13
Dorji Khando (BHU)	0	2
Zakariya Ghali (KSA)	12	14^{P}
Hassan Al-Mesmari (UAE)	2	1
Sergio Suzuki (JPN)	15	14

Round of 16
Niyaz Pulatov (UZB)	9	11
Lee Gi-beom (KOR)	11	24
Alireza Hosseinpour (IRI)	10	9
Muhammad Arbaz Khan (PAK)	3	4
Ralph Hneineh (LBN)	12	8
Zakariya Ghali (KSA)	6	5
Sergio Suzuki (JPN)	8	9
Zaid Al-Halawani (JOR)	11	11

Quarterfinals
Lee Gi-beom (KOR)	5	2
Alireza Hosseinpour (IRI)	16	14
Ralph Hneineh (LBN)	0	5
Zaid Al-Halawani (JOR)	8	11

Semifinals
Alireza Hosseinpour (IRI)	6	0
Zaid Al-Halawani (JOR)	3	0
