= 2024 European Taekwondo Championships – Men's 63 kg =

Men's 63 kg at the 2024 European Taekwondo Championships
- Venue: Belgrade Fair – Hall 1
- Location: Belgrade, Serbia
- Dates: 9 May
- Competitors: 24 from 24 nations

Medalists
gold medal	Omar Salim	Hungary
silver medal	Hakan Reçber	Turkey
bronze medal	Volodymyr Bystrov	Ukraine
bronze medal	Tobias Hyttel	Denmark

The men's 63 kg competition at the 2024 European Taekwondo Championships was held on 9 May 2024.

== Results ==
=== Finals ===
Semifinals
Hakan Reçber (TUR)	2
Tobias Hyttel (DEN)	0
Volodymyr Bystrov (UKR)	0
Omar Salim (HUN)	2

Final
Hakan Reçber (TUR)	0
Omar Salim (HUN)	2

=== Top half ===
==== Section 1 ====
Round of 32
Maksim Bandarevich (AIN)	0
Jamie McIntosh (GBR)	2
Daniel Lo Pinto (ITA)	2
Damien Frgolec (SVK)	0

Round of 16
Hakan Reçber (TUR)	2
Jamie McIntosh (GBR)	0
Daniel Lo Pinto (ITA)	2
Mateusz Chrzanowski (POL)	1

Quarterfinals
Hakan Reçber (TUR)	2
Daniel Lo Pinto (ITA)	0

==== Section 2 ====
Round of 32
João Zeller (POR)	0
Dmitriy Nagaev (ISR)	2
Ibrahim Đonko (BIH)	1
Riyad Shiraliyev (AZE)	2

Round of 16
Imran Özkaya (GER)	2
Dmitriy Nagaev (ISR)	0
Riyad Shiraliyev (AZE)	0
Tobias Hyttel (DEN)	2

Quarterfinals
Imran Özkaya (GER)	0
Tobias Hyttel (DEN)	2

=== Bottom half ===
==== Section 3 ====
Round of 32
Georgios Gerardis (GRE)	1
Kristian Borgen (NOR)	2
Mikhail Artamonov (AIN)	2
Davit Torosyan (ARM)	0

Round of 16
Novak Stanić (SRB)	2
Kristian Borgen (NOR)	0
Mikhail Artamonov (AIN)	1
Volodymyr Bystrov (UKR)	2

Quarterfinals
Novak Stanić (SRB)	0
Volodymyr Bystrov (UKR)	2

==== Section 4 ====
Round of 32
Leonard Daxner (AUT)	2
Ioannis Pilavakis (CYP)	1
Omar Salim (HUN)
Riad Bouhmida (NED)

Round of 16
Juirdo Cani (ALB)	2
Leonard Daxner (AUT)	0
Omar Salim (HUN)	2
Joan Jorquera (ESP)	0

Quarterfinals
Juirdo Cani (ALB)	0
Omar Salim (HUN)	2
