= Taekwondo at the 2023 European Games – Men's 63 kg =

Taekwondo competition

Men's 63 kg at the 2023 European Games
- Venue: Krynica-Zdrój Arena
- Date: 24 June
- Competitors: 15 from 15 nations

Medalists
| gold medal | Dennis Baretta | Italy |
| silver medal | Lovre Brečić | Croatia |
| bronze medal | Souleyman Alaphilippe | France |
| bronze medal | Joan Jorquera | Spain |

The men's 63 kg competition in taekwondo at the 2023 European Games took place on 24 June at the Krynica-Zdrój Arena.

== Schedule ==
All times are Central European Summer Time (UTC+2).

| Date | Time | Event |
|---|---|---|
| Saturday, 24 June 2023 | 09:12 | Round of 16 |
| Saturday, 24 June 2023 | 14:12 | Quarterfinals |
| Saturday, 24 June 2023 | 15:48 | Semifinals |
| Saturday, 24 June 2023 | 16:36 | Repechage |
| Saturday, 24 June 2023 | 19:12 | Bronze medal bouts |
| Saturday, 24 June 2023 | 20:12 | Final |

== Results ==
Round of 16
Tobias Hyttel (DEN) | 9 | 1
Volodymyr Bystrov (UKR) | 12 | 13
Dennis Baretta (ITA) | 10 | 11 | 12
Juirdo Cani (ALB) | 21 | 8 | 0
Niko Saarinen (FIN) | 9 | 1
Sebastian Uścimiuk (POL) | 11 | 9
Souleyman Alaphilippe (FRA) | 10 | 12
Egor Rogozhine (ISR) | 9 | 0
Bozhidar Avramov (BUL) | 7 | 4
Hakan Reçber (TUR) | 11 | 17
Imran Özkaya (GER) | 11 | 5 | 5
Novak Stanić (SRB) | 5 | 16 | 16
Ioannis Pilavakis (CYP) | 2 | 4
Lovre Brečić (CRO) | 16 | 9

Quarterfinals
Joan Jorquera (ESP) | 5 | 0 | 12
Volodymyr Bystrov (UKR) | 4 | 12 | 12
Dennis Baretta (ITA) | 13 | 14
Sebastian Uścimiuk (POL) | 1 | 1
Souleyman Alaphilippe (FRA) | 19 | 8
Hakan Reçber (TUR) | 12 | 8
Novak Stanić (SRB) | 4 | 3
Lovre Brečić (CRO) | 16 | 5

Semifinals
Joan Jorquera (ESP) | 4 | 5
Dennis Baretta (ITA) | 5 | 5
Souleyman Alaphilippe (FRA) | 3 | 2
Lovre Brečić (CRO) | 11 | 8

Final
Dennis Baretta (ITA) | 11 | 15
Lovre Brečić (CRO) | 7 | 6

=== Repechage ===
Repechage
Sebastian Uścimiuk (POL) | 8 | 12 | 7
Juirdo Cani (ALB) | 14 | 8 | 17
Ioannis Pilavakis (CYP) | 3 | 8
Novak Stanić (SRB) | 9 | 15

Bronze medal bout
Souleyman Alaphilippe (FRA) | 7^{P} | 14
Juirdo Cani (ALB) | 3 | 7
Novak Stanić (SRB) | 1 | 11 | 4
Joan Jorquera (ESP) | 11 | 6 | 7
