= Tom Burns (taekwondo) =

New Zealand taekwondo athlete

Tom Burns (born 23 April 2000) is a taekwondo athlete from New Zealand.

== Education ==
In 2018, as an 18-year-old, Burns left his home town of Christchurch to study at Korea Nazarene University in Cheonan.

== Career ==
He was selected to compete at the Taekwondo at the 2020 Summer Olympics – Men's 68 kg and lost to Bradly Sinden. In the repechage he was drawn against Hakan Reçber.
