= 2017 World Taekwondo Championships – Men's flyweight =

Taekwondo competition

Men's flyweight at the 2017 World Championships
- Venue: Taekwondowon
- Dates: 27–28 June 2017
- Competitors: 80 from 80 nations

Medalists
gold medal	Jeong Yun-jo	South Korea
silver medal	Mikhail Artamonov	Russia
bronze medal	Carlos Navarro	Mexico
bronze medal	Jesús Tortosa	Spain

The men's flyweight is a competition featured at the 2017 World Taekwondo Championships, and was held at the Taekwondowon in Muju County, South Korea on June 27 and June 28. Flyweights were limited to a maximum of 58 kilograms in body mass.

== Results ==
Legend

- DQ — Won by disqualification
- P — Won by punitive declaration

=== Finals ===
Quarterfinals		Semifinals		Final
Carlos Navarro (MEX)	32
Molomyn Tümenbayar (MGL)	18	Carlos Navarro (MEX)	3
Tawin Hanprab (THA)	15	Jeong Yun-jo (KOR)	15
Jeong Yun-jo (KOR)	28^{P}			Jeong Yun-jo (KOR)	24
Hedi Neffati (TUN)	12			Mikhail Artamonov (RUS)	23
Jesús Tortosa (ESP)	16	Jesús Tortosa (ESP)	6
Mikhail Artamonov (RUS)	8	Mikhail Artamonov (RUS)	16^{P}
Farzan Ashourzadeh (IRI)	7

=== Top half ===
==== Section 1 ====
Round of 128
Wu Yichao (CHN)	21
Yeshi Dorji (BHU)	1
Aaron Kobenan (CIV)	38^{P}
Hamza Souleymane (NIG)	27

Round of 64
Carlos Navarro (MEX)	20
Wu Yichao (CHN)	12
Mohammed Al-Mahrouqi (OMA)	16^{P}
Luis Oblitas (PER)	12
Eryk Rodzik (POL)	17
Wandile Maziya (SWZ)	9
Aaron Kobenan (CIV)	6
Sergio Suzuki (JPN)	13

Round of 32
Carlos Navarro (MEX)	12
Mohammed Al-Mahrouqi (OMA)	3
Eryk Rodzik (POL)	8
Sergio Suzuki (JPN)	23

Round of 16
Carlos Navarro (MEX)	16
Sergio Suzuki (JPN)	3

==== Section 2 ====
Round of 128
Chalinda Liyanage (SRI)	17
Jorge Ramos (CHI)	32
David Mathambo (BOT)	6
Cristiano Valeriano (BRA)	17^{P}

Round of 64
Miloš Gladović (SRB)	16
Jorge Ramos (CHI)	7
Igor Poyedynok (UKR)	19
Molomyn Tümenbayar (MGL)	21
Chester Peralta (ECU)	DQ
~~Yahya Ayash (YEM)~~
Cristiano Valeriano (BRA)	13
Luisito Pié (DOM)	18

Round of 32
Miloš Gladović (SRB)	9
Molomyn Tümenbayar (MGL)	16
Chester Peralta (ECU)	8
Luisito Pié (DOM)	16

Round of 16
Molomyn Tümenbayar (MGL)	11
Luisito Pié (DOM)	10

==== Section 3 ====
Round of 128
Zaw Lin Htet (MYA)	6
Sisay Baykedagne (ETH)	15
Nicolas Migneault (CAN)	2
Mohamed Farag (EGY)	12

Round of 64
Tawin Hanprab (THA)	36
Sisay Baykedagne (ETH)	6
Jack Francois (NZL)	11
Liam Bette (FGT)	16
Isah Adamu (NGR)	20^{P}
Tyler Miyagishima (USA)	27
Mohamed Farag (EGY)	10
Stepan Dimitrov (MDA)	18

Round of 32
Tawin Hanprab (THA)	25
Liam Bette (FGT)	4
Isah Adamu (NGR)	6
Stepan Dimitrov (MDA)	19

Round of 16
Tawin Hanprab (THA)	15
Stepan Dimitrov (MDA)	14

==== Section 4 ====
Round of 128
Mohsen Rezaee (AFG)	30^{P}
Chan Chon In (MAC)	4
Michael Ochieng (KEN)	3
Badri Paksashvili (GEO)	24^{P}

Round of 64
Max Cater (GBR)	24
Mohsen Rezaee (AFG)	23
Víctor González (PAN)	0
Meisam Rafiei (ISL)	12
Abdullatif Sezgin (GER)	DQ
~~Regis Iyumva (RWA)~~
Badri Paksashvili (GEO)	1
Jeong Yun-jo (KOR)	14

Round of 32
Max Cater (GBR)	13
Meisam Rafiei (ISL)	9
Abdullatif Sezgin (GER)	12
Jeong Yun-jo (KOR)	24

Round of 16
Max Cater (GBR)	5
Jeong Yun-jo (KOR)	16

=== Bottom half ===
==== Section 5 ====
Round of 128
~~Anelka Emacin (HAI)~~
Aleksandr Galaktionov (EST)	DQ
Ahmed Dghbas (QAT)	20^{P}
Qendrim Sejfijaj (KOS)	13

Round of 64
Safwan Khalil (AUS)	19^{P}
Aleksandr Galaktionov (EST)	5
Kaloyan Binev (BUL)	15
Jin Agojo (PHI)	30^{P}
Huang Cheng-ching (TPE)	6
Pablo Solano (CRC)	2
Ahmed Dghbas (QAT)	19
Hedi Neffati (TUN)	28

Round of 32
Safwan Khalil (AUS)	16
Jin Agojo (PHI)	9
Huang Cheng-ching (TPE)	2
Hedi Neffati (TUN)	24

Round of 16
Safwan Khalil (AUS)	6
Hedi Neffati (TUN)	12

==== Section 6 ====
Round of 128
Sikiyeh Moussa Farah (DJI)	3
Marumo Moloisane (LES)	26
~~Justus Amanya (UGA)~~
Celcio Coelho (STP)	DQ

Round of 64
Eleftherios Fakinos (GRE)	20
Marumo Moloisane (LES)	15
Georgios Nicolaou (CYP)	2
Francisco Palacios (GUA)	6
Yahor Nikitsenka (BLR)	6
Gadi Haimovitz (ISR)	18
Celcio Coelho (STP)	6
Jesús Tortosa (ESP)	25^{P}

Round of 32
Eleftherios Fakinos (GRE)	17^{P}
Francisco Palacios (GUA)	5
Gadi Haimovitz (ISR)	3
Jesús Tortosa (ESP)	20

Round of 16
Eleftherios Fakinos (GRE)	13
Jesús Tortosa (ESP)	33

==== Section 7 ====
Round of 128
Sagar Gubhaju (NEP)	24
Francis Mponda (ZAM)	4
Luca Ghiotti (SMR)	9
Antoine Thiery Amougou (CMR)	24

Round of 64
Salaheddine Bensaleh (BEL)	35^{P}
Sagar Gubhaju (NEP)	21
Román Mosquera (COL)	15
Temurbek Urolov (UZB)	23
Nguyễn Văn Duy (VIE)	DQ
~~Egers Aliu (ALB)~~
Antoine Thiery Amougou (CMR)	1
Mikhail Artamonov (RUS)	23

Round of 32
Salaheddine Bensaleh (BEL)	18^{P}
Temurbek Urolov (UZB)	21
Nguyễn Văn Duy (VIE)	8
Mikhail Artamonov (RUS)	13

Round of 16
Salaheddine Bensaleh (BEL)	6
Mikhail Artamonov (RUS)	16^{P}

==== Section 8 ====
Round of 128
Eric Melki (LBN)	23
Mertcan Dolmacı (TUR)	18^{P}
Al-Mostafa Sayed (SUD)	DQ
~~Muhammet Rozyýew (TKM)~~

Round of 64
Omar Lakehal (MAR)	26
Mertcan Dolmacı (TUR)	18
Gajendra Parihar (IND)	17
Malik Abu Al-Rob (PLE)	13
Fizam Mehtiyev (AZE)	9
Almas Mukamyrov (KAZ)	18
Al-Mostafa Sayed (SUD)	5
Farzan Ashourzadeh (IRI)	25

Round of 32
Omar Lakehal (MAR)	16^{P}
Gajendra Parihar (IND)	5
Almas Mukamyrov (KAZ)	3
Farzan Ashourzadeh (IRI)	15

Round of 16
Omar Lakehal (MAR)	15
Farzan Ashourzadeh (IRI)	29
