= Mikhail Artamonov =

Mikhail Artamonov may refer to:

- Mikhail Artamonov (historian) (Mikhail Illarionovich Artamonov, 1898–1972), Soviet historian and archaeologist
- Mikhail Artamonov (taekwondo) (Mikhail Vladimirovich Artamonov, born 1997), Russian taekwondo practitioner
