= Kwon Do-yun =

South Korean taekwondo practitioner

Personal information
- Nationality: South Korean

Sport
- Sport: Taekwondo
- Weight class: 68 kg
Medal record
Men's taekwondo
Representing South Korea
World Championships
Gold medal – first place	2022 Guadalajara	68 kg

Kwon Do-yun (Korean: 권도윤) is a South Korean taekwondo practitioner. He won a gold medal at the 2022 World Taekwondo Championships.

== Career ==
Kwon competed at the 2022 World Taekwondo Championships and won a gold medal in the 68 kg category, defeating defending world champion Bradly Sinden in the finals.
