= Taekwondo at the 2018 Asian Games – Men's 58 kg =

Taekwondo competition

Men's 58 kg at the 2018 Asian Games
- Venue: Jakarta Convention Center
- Date: 20 August 2018
- Competitors: 26 from 26 nations

Medalists
gold medal	Kim Tae-hun	South Korea
silver medal	Niyaz Pulatov	Uzbekistan
bronze medal	Sergio Suzuki	Japan
bronze medal	Farzan Ashourzadeh	Iran

The men's flyweight (58 kilograms) event at the 2018 Asian Games took place on 20 August 2018 at Jakarta Convention Center Plenary Hall, Jakarta, Indonesia.

== Schedule ==
All times are Western Indonesia Time (UTC+07:00)

Date	Time	Event
Monday, 20 August 2018	09:00	Round of 32
Monday, 20 August 2018	09:00	Round of 16
Monday, 20 August 2018	09:00	Quarterfinals
Monday, 20 August 2018	16:00	Semifinals
Monday, 20 August 2018	16:00	Final

== Results ==
=== Final ===
Final
Kim Tae-hun (KOR)	24
Niyaz Pulatov (UZB)	6

=== Top half ===
Round of 32
Chen Xiaoyi (CHN)	27
Jenar Torillos (PHI)	26
Mohsen Rezaee (AFG)	36
Zaw Linn Htet (MYA)	7
Yeldos Yskak (KAZ)	17
Zaid Kareem (JOR)	6
Yousef Abu Al-Rob (PLE)	64
Shihab Al-Arifi (YEM)	23
Thipphakone Kuangmany (LAO)	40
Nilton Corte-Real (TLS)	18

Round of 16
Kim Tae-hun (KOR)	40
Chen Xiaoyi (CHN)	2
Mohsen Rezaee (AFG)	40
Yeldos Yskak (KAZ)	46
Ali Asiri (KSA)	36
Yousef Abu Al-Rob (PLE)	32
Thipphakone Kuangmany (LAO)	28
Sergio Suzuki (JPN)	50

Quarterfinals
Kim Tae-hun (KOR)	11
Yeldos Yskak (KAZ)	9
Ali Asiri (KSA)	8
Sergio Suzuki (JPN)	22

Semifinals
Kim Tae-hun (KOR)	24
Sergio Suzuki (JPN)	11

=== Bottom half ===
Round of 32
Shahzaib Khan (PAK)	11
Enkhboldyn Buyanshagai (MGL)	27
Hou Kuang-wu (TPE)	40
Reinaldy Atmanegara (INA)	16
Võ Quốc Hưng (VIE)	40
Thisara Dharmapriya (SRI)	11
Sagar Guvaju (NEP)	54
Tenzin Dorji (BHU)	40
Ny Sovannroth (CAM)	11
Mahmadjon Sunatov (TJK)	30

Round of 16
Ramnarong Sawekwiharee (THA)	24
Enkhboldyn Buyanshagai (MGL)	3
Hou Kuang-wu (TPE)	28
Niyaz Pulatov (UZB)	30
Võ Quốc Hưng (VIE)	25
Sagar Guvaju (NEP)	5
Mahmadjon Sunatov (TJK)	3
Farzan Ashourzadeh (IRI)	26

Quarterfinals
Ramnarong Sawekwiharee (THA)	21
Niyaz Pulatov (UZB)	23
Võ Quốc Hưng (VIE)	6
Farzan Ashourzadeh (IRI)	13

Semifinals
Niyaz Pulatov (UZB)	15
Farzan Ashourzadeh (IRI)	13
