= Ricardo Suzuki =

Japanese taekwondo practitioner

Ricardo Suzuki (鈴木リカルド, Suzuki Rikarudo, born 27 April 2000) is a Japanese male taekwondo practitioner of Bolivian descent who mainly competes in the featherweight category.

== Early and personal life ==
He was born in Bolivia to a Japanese father and a Bolivian mother. He moved to Japan in 2018 in order to attend Daito Bunka University, his brother Sergio Suzuki had also attended that university and had also gone on to represent Japan in taekwondo. Ricardo had been encouraged to begin taekwondo by his older brother Sergio and so he switched to the sport from karate when he was 10.

== Career ==
He competed at the world championships in 2015 and 2017 in the -58 kg category, and won bronze in the same category at the 2018 Asian Games in Indonesia. He was selected to compete in the Taekwondo at the 2020 Summer Olympics – Men's 68 kg.
