= Reçber =

Reçber is a Turkish surname. Notable people with the surname include:

- Hakan Reçber (born 1999), Turkish taekwondo practitioner
- Rüştü Reçber (born 1973), Turkish football goalkeeper and sports executive
