= Cristián Olivero =

Chilean taekwondo practitioner (born 2004)

Christian Olivero
Personal information
- Full name: Cristian Felipe Olivero Toro
- Born: 26 January 2004 (age 22)

Sport
- Sport: Taekwondo
Medal record
Representing Chile
Men's taekwondo
Pan American Championships
Gold medal – first place	2026 Rio de Janeiro	68 kg
Bronze medal – third place	2021 Cancún	63 kg
Bolivarian Games
Gold medal – first place	2025 Lima-Ayacucho	68 kg
Junior Pan American Games
Gold medal – first place	2025 Asunción	68 kg
Silver medal – second place	2021 Cali-Valle	68 kg
South American Youth Games
Gold medal – first place	2022 Rosario	63 kg

Cristian Felipe Olivero Toro (born 26 January 2004) is a Chilean taekwondo practitioner. He was a gold medalist at the 2025 Junior Pan American Games and competed at the 2023 and 2025 World Taekwondo Championships.

== Career ==
He was a silver medalist at the 2021 Junior Pan American Games in Cali, Colombia, in the -68kg division. He won a bronze medal at the 2021 Pan American Taekwondo Championships in the –63 kg category. He competed at the 2023 World Taekwondo Championships in Baku, Azerbaijan where he was defeated by eventual bronze medalist Joan Jorquera in the round of 16 of the bantamweight division.

He won the gold medal at the 2025 Junior Pan American Games in Asunción, Paraguay, defeating Maikol Rodriguez of the United States in the final. The victory also gave him automatic qualification for the 2027 Pan American Games. In October 2025, he was a quarter finalist at the 2025 World Taekwondo Championships in Wuxi, China in the men's featherweight division.
