= Taekwondo at the 2022 Mediterranean Games – Men's 68 kg =

Taekwondo competition

Taekwondo – Men's 68 kg at the 2022 Mediterranean Games
- Venue: Mohammed Ben Ahmed Convention Centre
- Date: 3 July
- Competitors: 17 from 17 nations

Medalists
gold medal	Javier Pérez	Spain
silver medal	Hakan Reçber	Turkey
bronze medal	Konstantinos Chamalidis	Greece
bronze medal	Lovre Brečić	Croatia

The men's 68 kg competition in taekwondo at the 2022 Mediterranean Games was held on 3 July at the Mohammed Ben Ahmed Convention Centre in Oran.

== Results ==
Legend

- PTG — Won by Points Gap
- SUP — Won by superiority
- OT — Won on over time (Golden Point)
- DQ — Won by disqualification
- PUN — Won by punitive declaration
- WD — Won by withdrawal

Final

Final
Javier Pérez (ESP)	25
Hakan Reçber (TUR)	24

Top half

Round of 32
Souleyman Alaphilippe (FRA)	27
Hani Tebib (ALG)	22

Round of 16
Javier Pérez (ESP)	22
Souleyman Alaphilippe (FRA)	6
Dennis Baretta (ITA)	10
Eyad Barakat (EGY)	8
Abdelbasset Wasfi (MAR)	15
Lin Kovačič (SLO)	17
Arber Azemi (KOS)	8
Konstantinos Chamalidis (GRE)	18

Quarterfinals
Javier Pérez (ESP)	25^{PTG}
Dennis Baretta (ITA)	4
Lin Kovačič (SLO)	11
Konstantinos Chamalidis (GRE)	20

Semifinals
Javier Pérez (ESP)	16
Konstantinos Chamalidis (GRE)	3

Bottom half

Round of 32

Round of 16
Lovre Brečić (CRO)	26
Michele Ceccaroni (SMR)	6
Ioannis Pilavakis (CYP)	24
Juirdo Cani (ALB)	26
Zinedin Bećović (MNE)	42^{PUN}
Novak Stanić (SRB)	18
Najimuldin Birzeeq (LBA)	24
Hakan Reçber (TUR)	34

Quarterfinals
Lovre Brečić (CRO)	42^{PTG}
Juirdo Cani (ALB)	10
Zinedin Bećović (MNE)	34
Hakan Reçber (TUR)	35^{GDP}

Semifinals
Lovre Brečić (CRO)	33
Hakan Reçber (TUR)	36
