= 2021 Asian Taekwondo Championships =

Taekwondo competition

- Venue: Nouhad Naufal Stadium
- Location: Beirut, Lebanon
- Dates: 16–18 June 2021

Champions
- Men: South Korea
- Women: South Korea

The 2021 Asian Taekwondo Championships were the 24th edition of the Asian Taekwondo Championships, and were held from 16 to 18 June 2021 in Nouhad Naufal Stadium, Zouk Mikael, near Beirut, Lebanon.

== Medal summary ==
=== Men ===
Event	Gold	Silver	Bronze
Finweight −54 kg	Bae Jun-seo; South Korea	Hossein Lotfi; Iran	Mark Khalife; Lebanon
Finweight −54 kg	Bae Jun-seo; South Korea	Hossein Lotfi; Iran	Samat Temirkhan; Kazakhstan
Flyweight −58 kg	Mohsen Rezaee; Afghanistan	Kim Young-hwan; South Korea	Armin Hadipour; Iran
Flyweight −58 kg	Mohsen Rezaee; Afghanistan	Kim Young-hwan; South Korea	Haroon Khan; Pakistan
Bantamweight −63 kg	Niyaz Pulatov; Uzbekistan	Zaid Al-Halawani; Jordan	Dashdavaagiin Chinzorig; Mongolia
Bantamweight −63 kg	Niyaz Pulatov; Uzbekistan	Zaid Al-Halawani; Jordan	Hikmatullah Zain; Afghanistan
Featherweight −68 kg	Huang Yu-jen; Chinese Taipei	Jin Ho-jun; South Korea	Zaid Kareem; Jordan
Featherweight −68 kg	Huang Yu-jen; Chinese Taipei	Jin Ho-jun; South Korea	Jasurbek Jaysunov; Uzbekistan
Lightweight −74 kg	Kim Seok-bae; South Korea	Amir Mohammad Bakhshi; Iran	Shakhboz Tusmatov; Uzbekistan
Lightweight −74 kg	Kim Seok-bae; South Korea	Amir Mohammad Bakhshi; Iran	Mehdi Jalali; Iran
Welterweight −80 kg	Saleh El-Sharabaty; Jordan	Liu Wei-ting; Chinese Taipei	Park Woo-hyeok; South Korea
Welterweight −80 kg	Saleh El-Sharabaty; Jordan	Liu Wei-ting; Chinese Taipei	Nikita Rafalovich; Uzbekistan
Middleweight −87 kg	Lee Seung-hwan; South Korea	Smaiyl Duisebay; Kazakhstan	Shukhrat Salaev; Uzbekistan
Middleweight −87 kg	Lee Seung-hwan; South Korea	Smaiyl Duisebay; Kazakhstan	Abdullah Mohammad; Syria
Heavyweight +87 kg	Sajjad Mardani; Iran	Bae Yoon-min; South Korea	Ray Rahy; Lebanon
Heavyweight +87 kg	Sajjad Mardani; Iran	Bae Yoon-min; South Korea	Shokhrukh Radjabov; Uzbekistan

=== Women ===
Event	Gold	Silver	Bronze
Finweight −46 kg	Negar Esmaeili; Iran	Kang Mi-reu; South Korea	Fereshteh Khazaei; Iran
Finweight −46 kg	Negar Esmaeili; Iran	Kang Mi-reu; South Korea	Shokhsanam Azamova; Uzbekistan
Flyweight −49 kg	Trương Thị Kim Tuyền; Vietnam	Madinabonu Mannopova; Uzbekistan	Anna El-Haddad; Lebanon
Flyweight −49 kg	Trương Thị Kim Tuyền; Vietnam	Madinabonu Mannopova; Uzbekistan	Kang Bo-ra; South Korea
Bantamweight −53 kg	Charos Kayumova; Uzbekistan	Su Po-ya; Chinese Taipei	Ghazal Soltani; Iran
Bantamweight −53 kg	Charos Kayumova; Uzbekistan	Su Po-ya; Chinese Taipei	Ghazal Kiani; Palestine
Featherweight −57 kg	Kim Yu-jin; South Korea	Trần Thị Ánh Tuyết; Vietnam	Chen Yu-chuang; Chinese Taipei
Featherweight −57 kg	Kim Yu-jin; South Korea	Trần Thị Ánh Tuyết; Vietnam	Nahid Kiani; Iran
Lightweight −62 kg	Feruza Sadikova; Uzbekistan	Jeon Chae-eun; South Korea	Parisa Javadi; Iran
Lightweight −62 kg	Feruza Sadikova; Uzbekistan	Jeon Chae-eun; South Korea	Lin Ting-ru; Chinese Taipei
Welterweight −67 kg	Julyana Al-Sadeq; Jordan	Melika Mirhosseini; Iran	Mokhru Khalimova; Tajikistan
Welterweight −67 kg	Julyana Al-Sadeq; Jordan	Melika Mirhosseini; Iran	Maram Fatnassi; Qatar
Middleweight −73 kg	Myeong Mi-na; South Korea	Cansel Deniz; Kazakhstan	Zeinab Esmaeili; Iran
Middleweight −73 kg	Myeong Mi-na; South Korea	Cansel Deniz; Kazakhstan	Ma Ting-hsia; Chinese Taipei
Heavyweight +73 kg	Yoon Do-hee; South Korea	Kirstie Alora; Philippines	Zahra Pouresmaeil; Iran
Heavyweight +73 kg	Yoon Do-hee; South Korea	Kirstie Alora; Philippines	Axaule Yerkassimova; Kazakhstan

== Medal table ==
Rank	Nation	Gold	Silver	Bronze	Total
1	South Korea	6	5	2	13
2	Uzbekistan	3	1	6	10
3	Iran	2	3	8	13
4	Jordan	2	1	1	4
5	Chinese Taipei	1	2	3	6
6	Vietnam	1	1	0	2
7	Afghanistan	1	0	1	2
8	Kazakhstan	0	2	2	4
9	Philippines	0	1	0	1
10	Lebanon	0	0	3	3
11	Mongolia	0	0	1	1
11	Pakistan	0	0	1	1
11	Palestine	0	0	1	1
11	Qatar	0	0	1	1
11	Syria	0	0	1	1
11	Tajikistan	0	0	1	1
Totals (16 entries)		16	16	32	64

== Team ranking ==
=== Men ===
Rank	Team	Points
1	South Korea	381
2	Uzbekistan	239
3	Iran	207
4	Jordan	207

=== Women ===
Rank	Team	Points
1	South Korea	502
2	Iran	265
3	Vietnam	178
4	Jordan	128
