= 2024 European Taekwondo Championships – Men's 68 kg =

Men's 68 kg at the 2024 European Taekwondo Championships
- Venue: Belgrade Fair – Hall 1
- Location: Belgrade, Serbia
- Dates: 11 May
- Competitors: 29 from 29 nations

Medalists
gold medal	Bradly Sinden	Great Britain
silver medal	Ilia Danilov
bronze medal	Simur Mirzoiev	Ukraine
bronze medal	Levente Józsa	Hungary

The men's 68 kg competition at the 2024 European Taekwondo Championships was held on 11 May 2024.

== Results ==
=== Finals ===
Semifinals
Bradly Sinden (GBR)	2
Simur Mirzoiev (UKR)	0
Levente Józsa (HUN)	1
Ilia Danilov (AIN)	2

Final
Bradly Sinden (GBR)	2
Ilia Danilov (AIN)	0

=== Top half ===
==== Section 1 ====
Round of 32
Yashar Mammadli (AZE)	0
Antonio Falco (ITA)	2
Marko Golubić (CRO)	2
Jesse van Vulpen (NED)	0
Artak Hovhannisyan (ARM)	0
Ferhat Can Kavurat (TUR)	2

Round of 16
Bradly Sinden (GBR)	2
Antonio Falco (ITA)	0
Marko Golubić (CRO)	2
Ferhat Can Kavurat (TUR)	0

Quarterfinals
Bradly Sinden (GBR)	2
Marko Golubić (CRO)	1

==== Section 2 ====
Round of 32
Ali Alian (SWE)	2
Erfan Moradi (RTA)	0
Ali Radwan (AIN)	2
Aleksandar Dzhordzhev (BUL)	0
Simur Mirzoiev (UKR)	2
Theofanis Xanthakos (GRE)	0
Filip Blazevski (MKD)	0
Žarko Krajišnik (SRB)	2

Round of 16
Ali Alian (SWE)	2
Ali Radwan (AIN)	0
Simur Mirzoiev (UKR)	RSC
Žarko Krajišnik (SRB)

Quarterfinals
Ali Alian (SWE)	0
Simur Mirzoiev (UKR)	2

=== Bottom half ===
==== Section 3 ====
Round of 32
Miroslav Frgolec (SVK)	0
Egers Aliu (ALB)	2
Beka Kavtaradze (GEO)	2
Sadmir Habibović (BIH)	0
Tiago Reis (POR)	0
Théo Lucien (FRA)	2

Round of 16
Levente Józsa (HUN)	2
Egers Aliu (ALB)	0
Beka Kavtaradze (GEO)	0
Théo Lucien (FRA)	2

Quarterfinals
Levente Józsa (HUN)	2
Théo Lucien (FRA)	0

==== Section 4 ====
Round of 32
Otto Jørgensen (DEN)	2
Keanu Niitmets (EST)	0
Niko Myllynen (FIN)	0
Zinedin Bećović (MNE)	2
Leo Speight (ISL)	0
Ilia Danilov (AIN)	2

Round of 16
Otto Jørgensen (DEN)	1
Zinedin Bećović (MNE)	2
Ilia Danilov (AIN)	2
Javier Pérez (ESP)	0

Quarterfinals
Zinedin Bećović (MNE)	1
Ilia Danilov (AIN)	2
