= Volodymyr Bystrov =

Ukrainian taekwondo practitioner (born 2004)

Personal information
- Nationality: Ukraine
- Born: 25 April 2004 (age 22) Kyiv, Ukraine

Sport
- Sport: Taekwondo
- Event: 63 kg
- Club: Spartak
- Coached by: V. Andriievskyi
Medal record
Men's taekwondo
Representing Ukraine
European Championships
| Silver medal – second place | 2026 Munich | 68 kg |
| Bronze medal – third place | 2024 Belgrade | 63 kg |
European U21 Championships
| Silver medal – second place | 2023 Bucharest | 63 kg |
European Junior Championships
| Bronze medal – third place | 2021 Sarajevo | 63 kg |

Volodymyr Bystrov (Ukrainian: Володимир Бистров; born 25 April 2004 in Kyiv) is a Ukrainian taekwondo practitioner. He is 2024 European Championships bronze medallist.

== Career ==
First World Championships Bystrov competed at was the 2022 tournament. In Mexican Guadalajara, he defeated Mohamed Rkiza from Equatorial Guinea and Tobias Hyttel from Denmark but lost in the round of 16 to the eventual bronze medallist Zaid Al-Halawani from Jordan.

In 2023, Bystrov competed at the 2021 Summer World University Games where he lost to Kazakh Shamsat Duisenov in the round of 16. Later he represented Ukraine at the 2023 European Games. He defeated Tobias Hyttel from Denmark but lost to Spanish Joan Jorquera in the quarterfinal.

First major international success at senior level came in May 2024 when he won bronze at the 2024 European Championships in Belgrade.
