= Jeong Yun-jo =

South Korean taekwondo practitioner

Personal information
- Born: 29 October 1995 (age 30)
- Weight: 58 kg (128 lb)

Sport
- Sport: Taekwondo
Medal record
Representing South Korea
World Taekwondo Championships
Gold medal – first place	2017 Muju	Flyweight

Jeong Yun-Jo (Korean: 정윤조; 29 October 1995) is a South Korean Taekwondo practitioner. He won the gold medal at the 2017 World Taekwondo Championships on the flyweight category.
