= Matthew Howell =

British taekwondo practitioner (born 2003)

Personal information
- Full name: Matthew Timothy Howell
- Born: 18 April 2003 (age 23) Plymouth, England
- Height: 182.5 cm (6 ft 0 in)

Sport
- Sport: Taekwondo
Medal record
Men's taekwondo
Representing Great Britain
World University Games
Bronze medal – third place	2025 Rhine-Ruhr	-68 kg
European Taekwondo Championships
Bronze medal – third place	2026 Munich	-68 kg

Matthew Timothy Howell (born 18 April 2003) is a British Taekwondo practitioner. He was a bronze medalist at the 2025 University Games and competed at the 2025 World Taekwondo Championships.

== Biography ==
Born in Plymouth, Howell trained in Taekwondo at South Hams Taekwondo Club. He attended Ivybridge Community College in Devon, and the University of Nottingham from 2021, where he studied Electrical and Electronic Engineering. He won a gold medal at the 2022 EUSA European Universities Games in Łódź.

Howell had a third place finish in the -68kg division at the Spanish Open in May 2025. He won a bronze medal at the 2025 Summer World University Games in Germany in the -68kg division. He competed at the 2025 World Taekwondo Championships in Wuxi, China, in October 2025 in the men's featherweight division.

In May 2026, Howell was a bronze medalist at the 2026 European Taekwondo Championships in Munich, Germany in the men's -68kg category.
