= Reza Kalhor =

Personal information
- Nationality: Iranian
- Born: Tehran, Iran

Sport
- Country: Iran
- Sport: Taekwondo
Medal record
Men's taekwondo
Representing Iran
World Championships
Bronze medal – third place	2022 Guadalajara	-68 kg
World Junior Championships
Gold medal – first place	2022 Sofia	-73 kg
Asian Junior Championships
Gold medal – first place	2022 Hô Chi Minh	-73 kg

Reza Kalhor (Persian : رضا کلهر) is an Iranian Taekwondo athlete.He won a bronze medal at the 2022 World Championships in the Men's -68 kg weight class.
