= Seong Yu-hyeon =

South Korean taekwondo practitioner

Personal information
- Nationality: South Korean

Sport
- Sport: Taekwondo
- Weight class: 68 kg
Medal record
Men's taekwondo
Representing South Korea
World Championships
Silver medal – second place	2025 Wuxi	68 kg

Seong Yu-hyeon (Korean: 성유현) is a South Korean taekwondo practitioner. He won a silver medal at the 2025 World Taekwondo Championships.

== Career ==
Seong was named to the South Korean national team for the first time in 2025. He made his World Taekwondo Championships debut at the 2025 World Taekwondo Championships and won a silver medal in the 68 kg category, losing to Banlung Tubtimdang in the finals.
