= Taekwondo at the 2020 Summer Olympics – Men's 68 kg =

Taekwondo competition

Men's 68 kg at the Games of the XXXII Olympiad
- Venue: Makuhari Messe
- Date: 25 July 2021
- Competitors: 17 from 17 nations

Medalists
1st place, gold medalist(s)		Ulugbek Rashitov	Uzbekistan
2nd place, silver medalist(s)		Bradly Sinden	Great Britain
3rd place, bronze medalist(s)		Hakan Reçber	Turkey
3rd place, bronze medalist(s)		Zhao Shuai	China

The men's 68 kg competition in Taekwondo at the 2020 Summer Olympics was held on 25 July, at the Makuhari Messe Hall A.

== Results ==
=== Finals ===
Gold medal
17 Ulugbek Rashitov (UZB)	34
2 Bradly Sinden (GBR)	29

=== Repechage ===
Repechage
Seydou Fofana (MLI)	9
Lee Dae-hoon (KOR)	11

Repechage
Mirhashem Hosseini (IRI)	21
Lee Dae-hoon (KOR)	30
Hakan Reçber (TUR)	23
Tom Burns (NZL)	8

Bronze medal
Zhao Shuai (CHN)	17
Lee Dae-hoon (KOR)	15
Nedžad Husić (BIH)	13
Hakan Reçber (TUR)	22

=== Pool A ===
Qualification round
16 Seydou Fofana (MLI)	17
17 Ulugbek Rashitov (UZB)	38

Round of 16
13 Nedžad Husić (BIH)	22
4 Ricardo Suzuki (JPN)	2
5 Javier Pérez (ESP)	20
12 Abdelrahman Wael (EGY)	22
9 Huang Yu-jen (TPE)	15
8 Mirhashem Hosseini (IRI)	18
1 Lee Dae-hoon (KOR)	19
17 Ulugbek Rashitov (UZB)	21

Quarter-finals
13 Nedžad Husić (BIH)	8
12 Abdelrahman Wael (EGY)	7
8 Mirhashem Hosseini (IRI)	22
17 Ulugbek Rashitov (UZB)	34

Semi-finals
13 Nedžad Husić (BIH)	5
17 Ulugbek Rashitov (UZB)	28

=== Pool B ===
Qualification round

Round of 16
15 Tom Burns (NZL)	8
2 Bradly Sinden (GBR)	53
7 Edival Pontes (BRA)	18
10 Hakan Reçber (TUR)	25
11 Bernardo Pié (DOM)	18
6 Jaouad Achab (BEL)	11
3 Zhao Shuai (CHN)	22
14 Abdullah Sediqi (EOR)	20

Quarter-finals
2 Bradly Sinden (GBR)	39
10 Hakan Reçber (TUR)	19
11 Bernardo Pié (DOM)	8
3 Zhao Shuai (CHN)	13

Semi-finals
2 Bradly Sinden (GBR)	33
3 Zhao Shuai (CHN)	25
