= Negar Esmaeili =

Iranian taekwondo practitioner

Personal information
- Nationality: Iranian
- Born: December 17, 2002 (age 23) Isfahan, Iran

Sport
- Country: Iran
- Sport: Taekwondo
- Event: Kyorugi
Medal record
Representing Iran
Women's taekwondo
Asian Junior Championships
Gold medal – first place	2019 Amman	Individual
Asian Championship
Gold medal – first place	2021 Beirut	Individual

Negar Esmaeili (Persian: نگار اسماعیلی, born 2002) is an Iranian taekwondo practitioner. She represented 2021 Asian Taekwondo Championships and claimed a gold medal in the women's Finweight, and became the second Iranian woman to become the champion of this competition.
