= Taekwondo at the 2022 Asian Games – Men's 68 kg =

Taekwondo competition

Men's 68 kg at the 2022 Asian Games
- Venue: Lin'an Sports and Culture Centre
- Date: 27 September 2023
- Competitors: 21 from 21 nations

Medalists
gold medal	Ulugbek Rashitov	Uzbekistan
silver medal	Zaid Kareem	Jordan
bronze medal	Matin Rezaei	Iran
bronze medal	Jin Ho-jun	South Korea

The men's 68 kilograms event at the 2022 Asian Games took place on 27 September 2023 at Lin'an Sports and Culture Centre, Hangzhou, China.

== Schedule ==
All times are China Standard Time (UTC+08:00)

Date	Time	Event
Wednesday, 27 September 2023	09:00	Round of 32
Wednesday, 27 September 2023	09:00	Round of 16
Wednesday, 27 September 2023	14:00	Quarterfinals
Wednesday, 27 September 2023	14:00	Semifinals
Wednesday, 27 September 2023	14:00	Gold medal contest

== Results ==
Legend

- DQ — Won by disqualification

=== Final ===
Gold medal contest
Zaid Kareem (JOR)	6	9
Ulugbek Rashitov (UZB)	14	13

=== Top half ===
Round of 32
Lý Hồng Phúc (VIE)	D	Q
Mohammad Shalan (QAT)
Hussein Imad (IRQ)	3	7	2
Hasham Al-Dookhy (KSA)	11	3	15
Eldar Kurmanaliev (KGZ)	18	19
Aslanbek Fazylov (TJK)	16	11

Round of 16
Zaid Kareem (JOR)	8	6
Lý Hồng Phúc (VIE)	0	0
Chaichon Cho (THA)	8	8
Arven Alcantara (PHI)	12	14
Xiao Chenming (CHN)	10	11
Hasham Al-Dookhy (KSA)	6	2
Eldar Kurmanaliev (KGZ)	6	0
Matin Rezaei (IRI)	19	12

Quarterfinals
Zaid Kareem (JOR)	8	18
Arven Alcantara (PHI)	1	5
Xiao Chenming (CHN)	14	12	14
Matin Rezaei (IRI)	7	12	15

Semifinals
Zaid Kareem (JOR)	14	6	8
Matin Rezaei (IRI)	10	7	5

=== Bottom half ===
Round of 32
Souladeth Khanthavongsa (LAO)	2	6
Hikmatullah Zain (AFG)	7	15
Lo Wai Fung (HKG)	D	Q
Ahmad Bahlool (PLE)

Round of 16
Jin Ho-jun (KOR)	11	8
Hikmatullah Zain (AFG)	3	5
Tsagaantsoojiin Bayanbat (MGL)	0	5	5
Eldar Birimbay (KAZ)	12	5	13
Chiu Yi-jui (TPE)	10	12
Bir Bahadur Mahara (NEP)	0	8
Lo Wai Fung (HKG)	1	4
Ulugbek Rashitov (UZB)	14	16

Quarterfinals
Jin Ho-jun (KOR)	6	12
Eldar Birimbay (KAZ)	3	7
Chiu Yi-jui (TPE)	0	4
Ulugbek Rashitov (UZB)	13	17

Semifinals
Jin Ho-jun (KOR)	9	7
Ulugbek Rashitov (UZB)	16	16
