= Maikol Rodriguez =

American taekwondo practitioner

Sport
- Sport: Taekwondo
Medal record
Representing United States
Men's taekwondo
World Championships
Bronze medal – third place	2025 Wuxi	68 kg
Junior Pan American Games
Silver medal – second place	2025 Asunción	68 kg

Maikol Rodriguez is an American taekwondo practitioner. He was a silver medalist at the 2025 Junior Pan American Games and a bronze medalist at the 2025 World Taekwondo Championships.

== Career ==
He won the silver medal at the 2025 Junior Pan American Games in Asunción, Paraguay, defeated in the final by Cristián Olivero. The following month, he placed second in the -68kg division at the WT President's Cup America in Lima, Peru.

In October 2025, he competed at the 2025 World Taekwondo Championships in Wuxi, China in the men's featherweight division, losing in the semifinals to Seong Yu-hyeon of South Korea, 2–1 in a tight third round.
