= Zaid Al-Halawani =

Jordanian taekwondo practitioner (born 2000)

Personal information
- Nationality: Jordanian
- Born: 11 January 2000 (age 26)

Sport
- Country: Jordan
- Sport: Taekwondo
Medal record
Men's taekwondo
Representing Jordan
World Championships
Bronze medal – third place	2022 Guadalajara	63 kg
Asian Games
Bronze medal – third place	2022 Hangzhou	–63 kg
Asian Championships
Silver medal – second place	2021 Beirut	63 kg
Bronze medal – third place	2022 Chuncheon	–63 kg

Zaid Al-Halawani (born 11 January 2000) is a Jordanian male taekwondo practitioner.

== Career ==
In 2019, Al-Halawani competed in the men's bantamweight event at the 2019 World Taekwondo Championships in Manchester, United Kingdom, where he lost to Jaouad Achab.

Al-Halawani competed for a spot for the 2020 Summer Olympics in Tokyo, which was delayed by a year due to the COVID-19 pandemic, through the 2021 Asian Qualification Tournament in Amman, Jordan. However, he failed to qualify for the Olympics through a top two finish, losing to Kurt Bryan Barbosa despite leading his opponent 12 seconds prior to the end of their match. The following month, he competed in the 2021 Asian Taekwondo Championships and won the silver medal, losing to Niyaz Pulatov.

Al-Halawani won a bronze medal in his event at the 2022 Asian Taekwondo Championships held in Chuncheon, South Korea. Later in November, he won the silver medal in the men's bantamweight event at the 2022 World Taekwondo Championships held in Guadalajara, Mexico. He also competed in the same event at the 2023 World Taekwondo Championships, where he lost to Banlung Tubtimdang, the latter in whom went on to win silver. He represented Jordan at the 2022 Asian Games (held in 2023) and claimed a bronze medal in the men's 63kg bantamweight event.
