= Matin Rezaei =

Iranian Taekwondo athlete (born 2005)

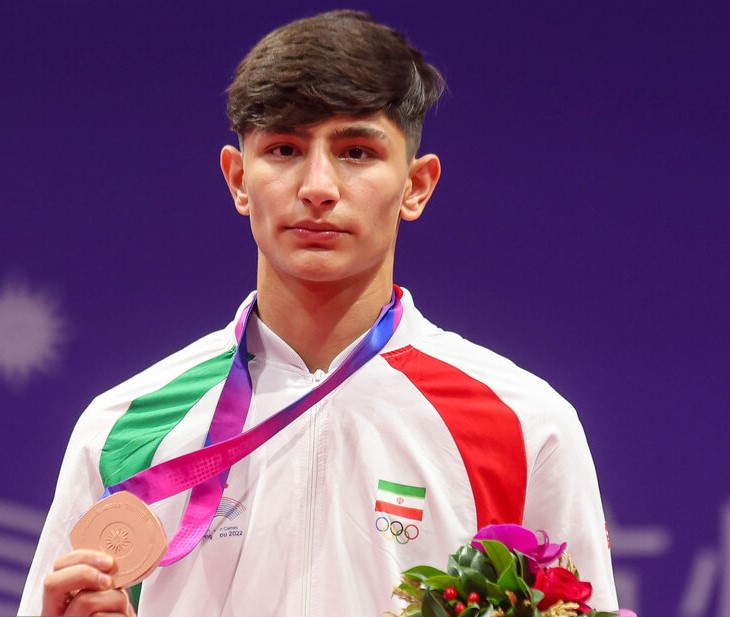

Personal information
- Born: 2 September 2005 (age 20) Tehran, Iran
- Weight: 68 kg

Sport
- Country: Iran
- Sport: Taekwondo
Medal record
Men's taekwondo
Representing Iran
World Championships
Bronze medal – third place	2023 Baku	68 kg
Asian Championships
Bronze medal – third place	2024 Da Nang	63 kg
Asian Games
Bronze medal – third place	2022 Hangzhou	68 kg
World U21 Championships
Bronze medal – third place	2025 Nairobi	68 kg
World Junior Championships
Gold medal – first place	2022 Sofia	68 kg

Matin Rezaei (Persian: متین رضایی, born 2 September 2005 In Tehran) is an Iranian Taekwondo athlete.He won a bronze medal at the 2022 Asian Games in the Men's 68 kg weight class.
