= Matija Črep =

Croatian taekwondo practitioner

Personal information
- Nationality: Croatian

Sport
- Sport: Taekwondo
- Weight class: 68 kg
Medal record
Men's taekwondo
Representing Croatia
World Championships
Bronze medal – third place	2025 Wuxi	68 kg

Matija Črep is a Croatian taekwondo practitioner. He won a bronze medal at the 2025 World Taekwondo Championships.

== Career ==
Črep made his World Taekwondo Championships debut at the 2023 World Taekwondo Championships.

In June 2025, Črep competed at the Austrian Open and won a bronze medal in the 68 kg category. In October 2025, he competed at the 2025 World Taekwondo Championships and won a bronze medal in the 68 kg category.
