= Ulugbek Rashitov =

Uzbekistani taekwondo practitioner

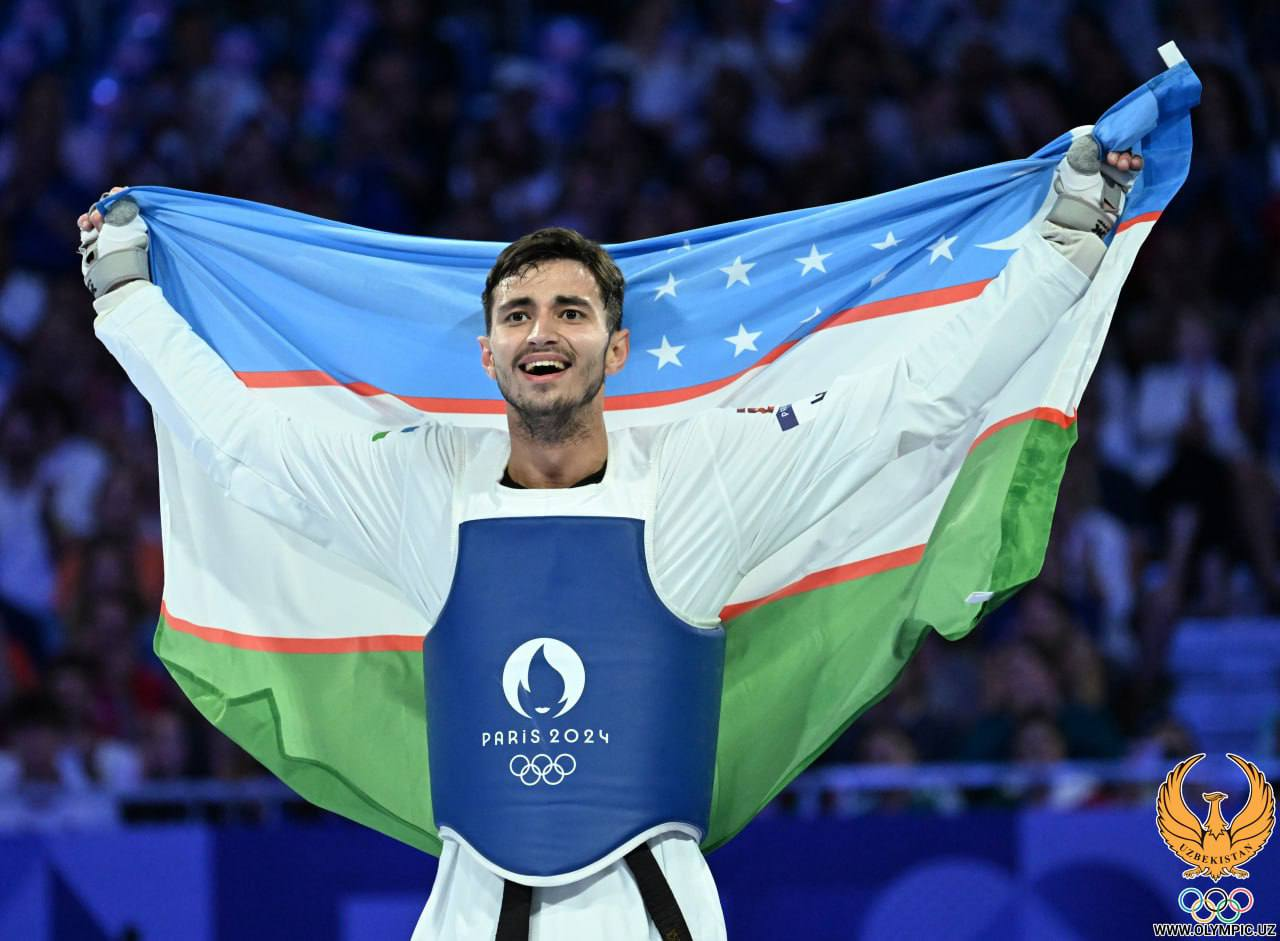
- Rashitov at the 2024 Summer Olympics

Personal information
- Born: 23 March 2002 (age 24)
- Height: 186 cm (6 ft 1 in)

Sport
- Country: Uzbekistan
- Sport: Taekwondo
- University team: National University of Uzbekistan
- Coached by: Pavel Khan
Medal record
Men's Taekwondo
Representing Uzbekistan
Olympic Games
Gold medal – first place	2020 Tokyo	68 kg
Gold medal – first place	2024 Paris	68 kg
World Championships
Bronze medal – third place	2023 Baku	68 kg
Grand Prix
Gold medal – first place	2023 Roma	68 kg
Gold medal – first place	2023 Paris	68 kg
Silver medal – second place	2022 Riyadh (F)	68 kg
Bronze medal – third place	2023 Taiyuan	68 kg
Asian Games
Gold medal – first place	2022 Hangzhou	68 kg
Asian Championships
Gold medal – first place	2022 Chuncheon	68 kg
Grand Slam
Gold medal – first place	2022 Wuxi	68 kg
Military World Games
Gold medal – first place	2019 Wuhan	58 kg
Islamic Solidarity Games
Gold medal – first place	2021 Konya	68 kg
Youth Olympic Games
Silver medal – second place	2018 Buenos Aires	48 kg
World Junior Championships
Bronze medal – third place	2018 Hammamet	51 kg
Asian Junior Championships
Gold medal – first place	2017 Atyrau	45 kg
Gold medal – first place	2019 Amman	55 kg

Ulugbek Rashitov (born 23 March 2002) is an Uzbek taekwondo practitioner. He won the gold medal in the Men's 68 kg event at the 2020 and 2024 Summer Olympics. In 2019, he won the gold medal in the 58 kg event at the Military World Games held in Wuhan, China.

== Career ==
In 2018, he won the silver medal in the boys' 48 kg event at the Summer Youth Olympics held in Buenos Aires, Argentina. In 2019, Rashitov won the gold medal in the 55 kg event at the Asian Junior Taekwondo Championships.

Rashitov represented Uzbekistan at the 2020 Summer Olympics in Tokyo, Japan. He won gold, beating Bradly Sinden of Great Britain in the final. At the 2020 Summer Olympics, he competed in the 68 kg weight category. In qualifying, he defeated Seydou Fofana from Mali In the 1/8 finals, he defeated two-time Olympic medalist from South Korea Lee Dae-Hoon. In the semi-finals, he went to dayan against Nedžad Husić (Bosnia and Herzegovina) and won a landslide victory with a score of 28:5. In the final, he defeated the British taekwondo player Bradley Sinden with a score of 34:29, winning the first gold medal at the Olympic Taekwondo Games in the history of the Uzbekistan national team.

The taekwondo athlete and two-time Olympic champion Ulugbek Rashitov has been suspended for two years from all competitions for an Anti-Doping Rule Violation (ADRV), the International Testing Agency (ITA), on behalf of World Taekwondo (WT) said. Rashitov committed three whereabouts failures within a 12-month period. The athlete did not challenge the ADRV and agreed with the consequences proposed by the ITA. Accordingly, the case was resolved via an acceptance of consequences.

== See also ==
Uzbekistan at the 2020 Summer Olympics
