= Carlos Navarro (taekwondo) =

Mexican taekwondo practitioner

Personal information
- Full name: Carlos Ruben Navarro Valdez
- Born: 8 May 1996 (age 30) Ciudad Juárez, Mexico
- Height: 178 cm (5 ft 10 in)
- Weight: 58 kg (128 lb)

Sport
- Sport: Taekwondo

Achievements and titles
- Olympic finals: 4th Place at the 2016 Rio Olympic Games
- Highest world ranking: 1
Medal record
Men's taekwondo
Representing Mexico
World Championships
Bronze medal – third place	2017 Muju	58 kg
Bronze medal – third place	2023 Baku	63 kg
World Junior Championships
Gold medal – first place	2010
Pan American Games
Gold medal – first place	2015 Toronto	58 kg
Bronze medal – third place	2023 Santiago	Team
Grand Prix
Gold medal – first place	2016 Baku	58 kg
Silver medal – second place	2015 Moscow	58 kg
Silver medal – second place	2018 Rome	58 kg
Silver medal – second place	2017 Rabat	58 kg
Pan American Championships
Gold medal – first place	2010	58 kg
Gold medal – first place	2016	58 kg
Gold medal – first place	2021	63 kg

Carlos Rúben Navarro Valdez (Note: In this Spanish name, the first or paternal surname is Navarro and the second or maternal family name is Valdez.) (born 8 May 1996) is a Mexican taekwondo athlete.

He represented his country at the 2016 Summer Olympics in Rio de Janeiro, in the men's 58 kg.

In 2019, he competed in the men's bantamweight event at the 2019 World Taekwondo Championships in Manchester, United Kingdom.
