= Jin Ho-jun =

South Korean taekwondo practitioner

Personal information
- Nationality: South Korean
- Born: 15 April 2002 (age 24)

Sport
- Sport: Taekwondo
- Weight class: Featherweight
Medal record
Men's taekwondo
Representing South Korea
World Championships
Silver medal – second place	2023 Baku	68 kg
Asian Championships
Gold medal – first place	2024 Da Nang	68 kg
Asian Games
Bronze medal – third place	2022 Hangzhou	68 kg

Jin Ho-jun (born 15 April 2002) is a taekwondo practitioner from South Korea. He was a silver medalist at the 2023 World Taekwondo Championships.

== Career ==
He won gold at the Manchester Grand Prix in 2022.

He was runner-up in the featherweight division at the 2023 World Taekwondo Championships in Baku. He won the bronze medal at the Asian Games in 2023 in Hangzhou.

He won gold at the Taiyuan Grand Prix in 2023.
