= Zaid Kareem =

Jordanian taekwondo practitioner (born 2001)

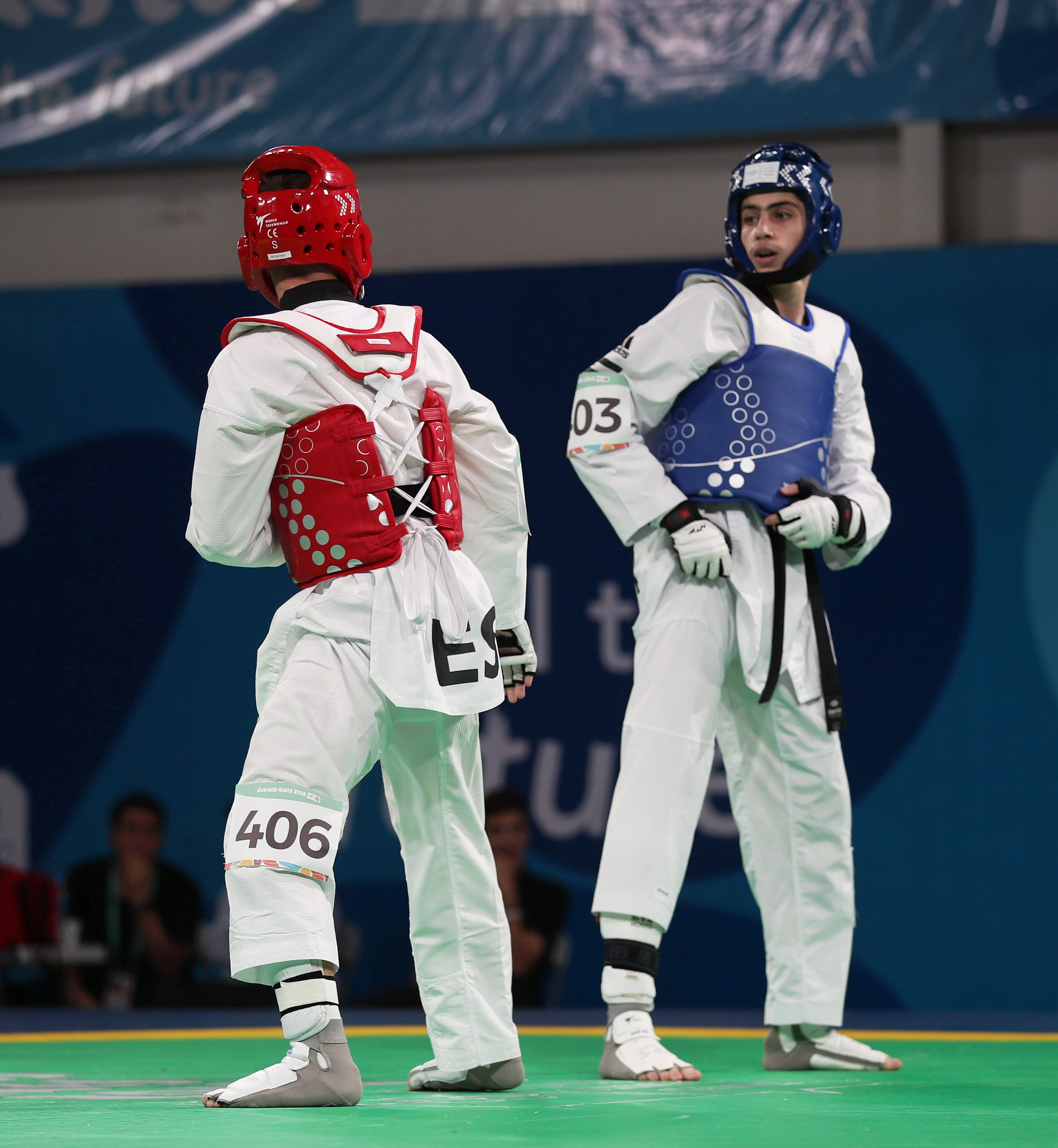
- Kareem (blue) at the 2018 Summer Youth Olympics

Personal information
- Full name: Zaid Mustafa Mahmoud Abdul Kareem
- Born: 19 June 2001 (age 25)
- Height: 184 cm (6 ft 0 in)

Sport
- Sport: Taekwondo
Medal record
Men's taekwondo
Representing Jordan
Olympic Games
Silver medal – second place	2024 Paris	68 kg
Asian Championships
Silver medal – second place	2022 Chuncheon	68 kg
Bronze medal – third place	2021 Beirut	68 kg
Bronze medal – third place	2026 Ulaanbaatar	68 kg
Asian Games
Silver medal – second place	2022 Hangzhou	68 kg
Bronze medal – third place	2026 Aichi-Nagoya	68 kg
Islamic Solidarity Games
Gold medal – first place	2025 Riyadh	74 kg
Youth Olympic Games
Bronze medal – third place	2018 Buenos Aires	55 kg

Zaid Kareem (Arabic: زيد كريم; born 19 June 2001) is a Jordanian Taekwondo practitioner who won a silver medal competing at the 2024 Summer Olympics.

== Career ==
He won bronze at the 2018 Youth Olympic Games in the 55 kg category. He was a bronze medallist at the 2021 Asian Taekwondo Championships in Beirut in the -68 kg division. In 2022, he became the first Jordanian to top the world taekwondo rankings. That year, he won the 2022 Grand Prix Final in Riyadh, as well as reaching the quarter-finals at the 2022 World Taekwondo Championships. He was also a silver medalist at the 2022 Asian Taekwondo Championships in Chuncheon, South Korea.

He also won a silver at the delayed 2022 Asian Games in Hangzhou in the Men's 68 kg. He was selected for the 2024 Summer Olympics in Paris. In the semi-final on 8 August 2024, he defeated Bradly Sinden to guarantee a medal in the 68kg category.
