= Niyaz Pulatov =

Uzbekistani taekwondo practitioner

Personal information
- Nationality: Uzbekistani
- Born: 21 September 1998 (age 28)
- Height: 180 cm (5 ft 11 in)
- Weight: 58 kg (128 lb)
- Spouse: Sabina Tashkenbaeva

Sport
- Country: Uzbekistan
- Sport: Taekwondo
Medal record
Representing Uzbekistan
Men's taekwondo
World Championships
Silver medal – second place	2022 Guadalajara	63 kg
Asian Games
Silver medal – second place	2018 Jakarta	58 kg
Islamic Solidarity Games
Gold medal – first place	2017 Baku	58 kg
Bronze medal – third place	2021 Konya	63 kg
Asian Indoor and Martial Arts Games
Bronze medal – third place	2017 Ashgabat	58 kg
Asian Championships
Gold medal – first place	2021 Beirut	63 kg
Bronze medal – third place	2018 Ho Chi Minh City	58 kg
Summer Universiade
Silver medal – second place	2019 Naples	63 kg
Military World Games
Bronze medal – third place	2019 Wuhan	63 kg

Niyaz Pulatov (born 21 September 1998) is an Uzbekistani male taekwondo practitioner. He won the silver medal in the men's bantamweight event at the 2022 World Taekwondo Championships held in Guadalajara, Mexico. He represented Uzbekistan at the 2018 Asian Games and claimed a silver medal in the men's 58kg flyweight event.

== Personal life ==
He is married to former rhythmic gymnast Sabina Tashkenbaeva.
