= Levente Józsa =

Hungarian taekwondo practitioner (born 2002)

Personal information
- Born: 4 October 2002 (age 23)

Sport
- Sport: Taekwondo
Medal record
Representing Hungary
Grand Prix
Gold medal – first place	2023 Manchester (F)	68 kg
European Championships
Bronze medal – third place	2024 Belgrade	68 kg

Levente Józsa (born 4 October 2002) is a Hungarian taekwondo practitioner. He was a bronze medalist at the 2024 European Taekwondo Championships and qualified for the 2024 Paris Olympics.

== Career ==
A left footed taekwondo, he started in the sport when he was six years-old. He is coached by Bence Galambos. He had a breakthrough during the 2023 World Taekwondo Grand Prix season; He won the silver medal at the Grand Prix in Rome to became the first Hungarian male taekwondo to win a medal in a GP competition. Later in 2023, he went one better and won the Grand Prix Manchester.

He was a bronze medalist at the 2024 European Taekwondo Championships in the 68kg division in Belgrade.

He succeeded in qualifying for the Olympic Games at the 2024 European Taekwondo Olympic Qualification Tournament in Sofia, Bulgaria

He was subsequently officially selected for the 2024 Summer Olympics in Paris.
