= Banlung Tubtimdang =

Thai taekwondo practitioner

Personal information
- Full name: บัลลังก์ ทับทิมแดง
- Nickname: หยู
- Nationality: Thai
- Born: 12 September 2005 (age 21)
- Height: 190 cm (6 ft 3 in)

Sport
- Country: Thailand
- Sport: Taekwondo
- Coached by: Chutchawal Khawlaor
Medal record
Men's taekwondo
Representing Thailand
World Championships
Gold medal – first place	2025 Wuxi	–68 kg
Silver medal – second place	2023 Baku	–63 kg
Asian Championships
Silver medal – second place	2024 Da Nang	–68 kg
Asian Games
Gold medal – first place	2022 Hangzhou	–63 kg
Gold medal – first place	2026 Aichi-Nagoya	68 kg
SEA Games
Gold medal – first place	2025 Bangkok	–68 kg
World University Games
Gold medal – first place	2025 Rhine-Ruhr	–68 kg
World Junior Championships
Silver medal – second place	2022 Sofia	–59 kg

Banlung Tubtimdang (Thai: บัลลังก์ ทับทิมแดง; born 12 September 2005) is a Thai taekwondo practitioner. He won a gold medal at the 2025 World Taekwondo Championships.

== Career ==
In September 2023, he won a gold medal at the Asian Games in Hangzhou, China. He was the first Thai male Taekwondo practitioner that won a gold medal at the Asian Games since his coach Chutchawal Khawlaor claimed the title at the 2010 Guangzhou Asian Games.
