= Liang Yushuai =

Chinese taekwondo practitioner

Personal information
- Native name: 梁育帅
- Nationality: Chinese
- Born: 10 September 2000 (age 25)

Sport
- Country: China
- Sport: Taekwondo
- Weight class: 63 kg
Medal record
Men's taekwondo
Representing China
Olympic Games
| Bronze medal – third place | 2024 Paris | –68 kg |
World Championships
| Gold medal – first place | 2022 Guadalajara | –63 kg |
Asian Championships
| Silver medal – second place | 2022 Chuncheon | –63 kg |
Military World Games
| Silver medal – second place | 2019 Wuhan | –58 kg |
World University Games
| Silver medal – second place | 2021 Chengdu | –68 kg |
| Silver medal – second place | 2025 Rhine-Ruhr | –68 kg |
| Bronze medal – third place | 2021 Chengdu | Team |

Liang Yushuai (Chinese: 梁育帅, born 10 September 2000) is a Chinese taekwondo practitioner. He won the gold medal in the men's bantamweight event at the 2022 World Taekwondo Championships held in Guadalajara, Mexico. He also won the silver medal in his event at the 2022 Asian Taekwondo Championships held in Chuncheon, South Korea.

In 2019, he won the silver medal in the 58 kg event at the Military World Games held in Wuhan, China.

At the 2024 Summer Olympics, Liang won a bronze medal in the men's –68 kg event.
