= Lovre Brečić =

Croatian taekwondo practitioner

Personal information
- Nationality: Croatian
- Born: 16 August 1996 (age 29) Split, Croatia
- Height: 180 (cm)

Sport
- Country: Croatia
- Sport: Taekwondo
- Event: Bantamweight (-63 kg)
- Turned pro: 2012

Achievements and titles
- Highest world ranking: 1
Medal record
Representing Croatia
Men's taekwondo
Grand Prix
Bronze medal – third place	2018 Fujairah (Final)	68 kg
European Games
Silver medal – second place	2023 Kraków-Małopolska	63 kg
European Championships
Gold medal – first place	2018 Kazan	63 kg
Mediterranean Games
Bronze medal – third place	2022 Oran	−68 kg
Universiade
Bronze medal – third place	2017 Taipei	63 kg
European U21 Championships
Gold medal – first place	2012 Athens	54 kg
European Junior Championships
Gold medal – first place	2011 Pafos	48 kg
- Updated on 08 December 2018

Lovre Brečić (born 16 August 1996) is a Croatian taekwondo athlete. He won the gold medal at the 2018 European Taekwondo Championships on the bantamweight (<63 kg) category.

He won one of the bronze medals in the men's 68 kg event at the 2022 Mediterranean Games held in Oran, Algeria.
