= Souleyman Alaphilippe =

French taekwondo

Personal information
- Nationality: French
- Born: Souleyman Alaphilippe; 30 June 2003 (age 23)

Sport
- Country: France
- Sport: Taekwondo
- Event: 63 kg
Medal record
Men's taekwondo
Representing France
Grand Prix
Bronze medal – third place	2023 Taiyuan	68 kg
European Games
Bronze medal – third place	2023 Kraków-Małopolska	63 kg
European Championships
Silver medal – second place	2022 Manchester	63 kg
Mediterranean Games
Gold medal – first place	2026 Taranto	68 kg

Souleyman Alaphilippe (born 30 June 2003) is a French taekwondo athlete.

== Career ==
Souleyman Alaphilippe wins the silver medal in the under-63 kg category at the 2022 European Championships in Manchester. He also won the bronze medal at the 2023 European Games in Cracow in the same category.

During early May 2024, the French Olympic Committee announced that Alaphilippe would be part of the France delegation at the 2024 Summer Olympics in Paris.
