= Mikhail Artamonov (taekwondo) =

Russian taekwondo practitioner

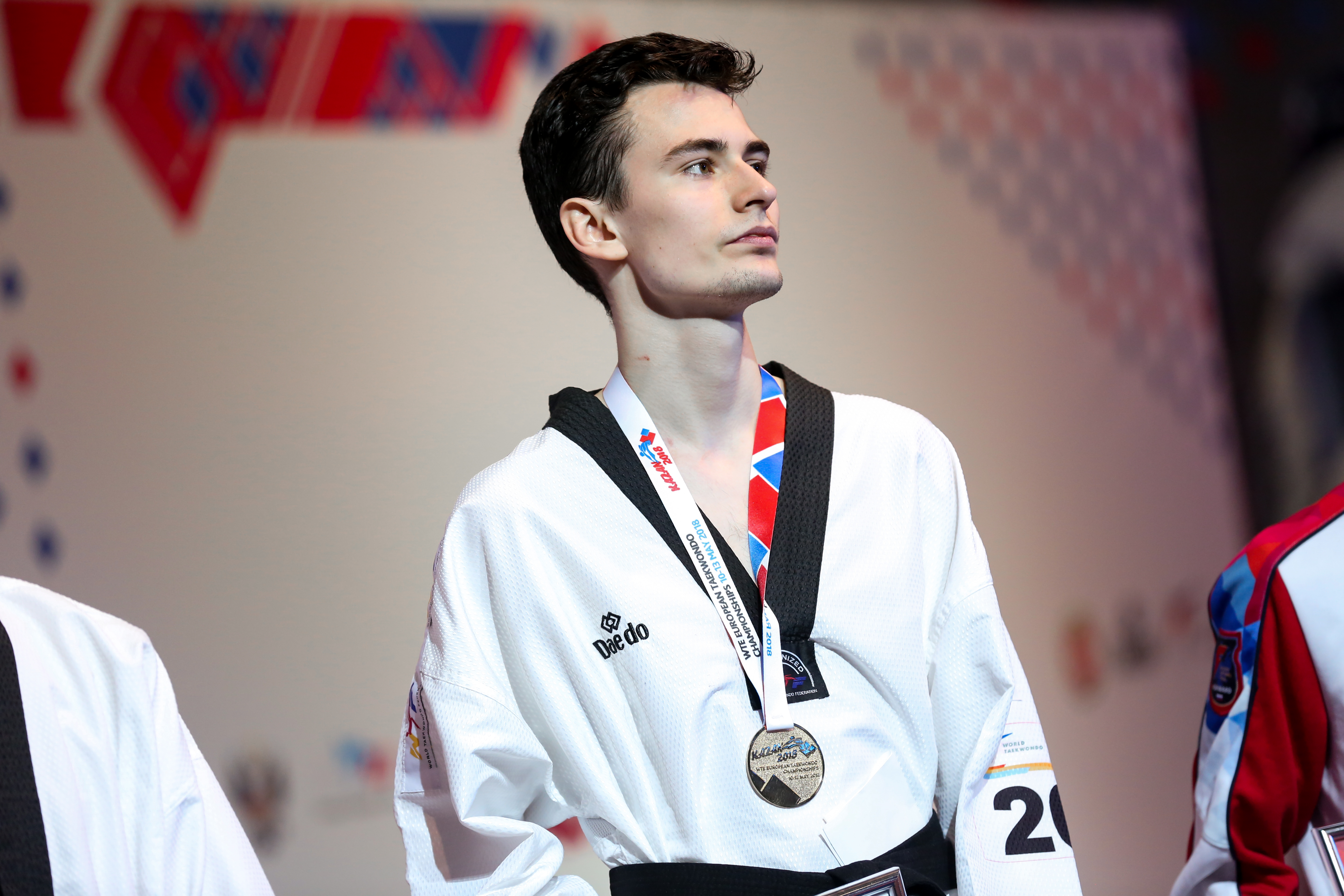
- Artamonov in 2018

Personal information
- Nationality: Russian
- Born: Mikhail Vladimirovich Artamonov; 20 July 1997 (age 28) Saint Petersburg, Russia
- Height: 180 cm (5 ft 11 in)
- Weight: 58 kg (128 lb)

Sport
- Country: Russia
- Sport: Taekwondo
- Event: Flyweight
- University team: Lesgaft National State University of Physical Education, Sport and Health
- Club: CSKA Moscow
- Coached by: Danil Yugay; Ilya Pak; Vasily Nikitin
Medal record
Representing (Russia) ROC
Olympic Games
Bronze medal – third place	2020 Tokyo	58 kg
Representing Russia
World Championships
Silver medal – second place	2017 Muju	58 kg
Grand Prix
Gold medal – first place	2018 Rome	58 kg
Bronze medal – third place	2018 Moscow	58 kg
Bronze medal – third place	2019 Rome	58 kg
European Championships
Gold medal – first place	2018 Kazan	58 kg
Bronze medal – third place	2016 Montreux	54 kg
European U21 Championships
Silver medal – second place	2015 Bukarest	54 kg

Mikhail Vladimirovich Artamonov (Russian: Михаил Владимирович Артамонов, IPA: [mʲɪxɐˈil ɐrtɐˈmonəf]; born 20 July 1997) is a Russian taekwondo athlete. He won a silver medal at the 2017 World Taekwondo Championships and a bronze at the 2020 Summer Olympics.
