= Sergio Suzuki =

Japanese taekwondo practitioner

Personal information
- Nationality: Japanese
- Born: 9 October 1994 (age 31) Kawasaki, Kanagawa, Japan
- Height: 177 cm (5 ft 10 in)
- Weight: 58 kg (128 lb)

Sport
- Country: Japan
- Sport: Taekwondo
- Event: 58kg flyweight
Medal record
Representing Japan
Men's taekwondo
Asian Games
Bronze medal – third place	2018 Jakarta	58kg flyweight

Sergio Suzuki (born 9 October 1994) is a Japanese male taekwondo practitioner of Bolivian descent who mainly competes in flyweight category. He represented Japan at the 2018 Asian Games and claimed a bronze medal in the men's 58kg flyweight event.

== Biography ==
He was born on 9 October 1994 in Japan to a Japanese father and Bolivian mother before moving to Bolivia at the age of five.
