= 2022 World Taekwondo Championships =

Taekwondo competition

- Venue: Centro Acuático CODE Metropolitano
- Location: Guadalajara, Mexico
- Dates: 14–20 November 2022
- Competitors: 710 from 120 nations

Champions
- Men: South Korea
- Women: Mexico

The 2022 World Taekwondo Championships was the 25th edition of the World Taekwondo Championships and was held at the Centro Acuático CODE Metropolitano, in Guadalajara, Mexico from 13 to 20 November 2022. It was at first scheduled to be held in Wuxi, China in 2021, but withdrawn due to the impact of the global COVID-19 pandemic to get the 2025 edition. In January 2022, the event was first moved to Cancún. This was the second time after 2013, that Mexico has held the event.

== Medal table ==
* Host nation (Mexico)

Rank	Nation	Gold	Silver	Bronze	Total
1	Mexico*	3	1	2	6
2	China	2	3	1	6
3	South Korea	2	2	1	5
4	Serbia	2	1	2	5
5	Spain	1	2	2	5
6	Uzbekistan	1	1	2	4
7	Croatia	1	0	1	2
8	Belgium	1	0	0	1
8	Hungary	1	0	0	1
8	Italy	1	0	0	1
8	United States	1	0	0	1
12	Great Britain	0	1	3	4
13	Chinese Taipei	0	1	2	3
14	Brazil	0	1	1	2
14	Turkey	0	1	1	2
16	Greece	0	1	0	1
16	Israel	0	1	0	1
18	Iran	0	0	3	3
19	Tunisia	0	0	2	2
20	Austria	0	0	1	1
20	Azerbaijan	0	0	1	1
20	Colombia	0	0	1	1
20	Egypt	0	0	1	1
20	Germany	0	0	1	1
20	Jordan	0	0	1	1
20	Puerto Rico	0	0	1	1
20	Saudi Arabia	0	0	1	1
20	Thailand	0	0	1	1
Totals (28 entries)		16	16	32	64

== Medal summary ==
=== Men ===
Event	Gold	Silver	Bronze
Finweight (−54 kg)	Omar Salim; Hungary	César Rodríguez; Mexico	Bae Jun-seo; South Korea
Finweight (−54 kg)	Omar Salim; Hungary	César Rodríguez; Mexico	Chen Po-yen; Chinese Taipei
Flyweight (−58 kg)	Vito Dell'Aquila; Italy	Jang Jun; South Korea	Brandon Plaza; Mexico
Flyweight (−58 kg)	Vito Dell'Aquila; Italy	Jang Jun; South Korea	Mohamed Khalil Jendoubi; Tunisia
Bantamweight (−63 kg)	Liang Yushuai; China	Niyaz Pulatov; Uzbekistan	Zaid Al-Halawani; Jordan
Bantamweight (−63 kg)	Liang Yushuai; China	Niyaz Pulatov; Uzbekistan	Joan Jorquera; Spain
Featherweight (−68 kg)	Kwon Do-yun; South Korea	Bradly Sinden; Great Britain	Reza Kalhor; Iran
Featherweight (−68 kg)	Kwon Do-yun; South Korea	Bradly Sinden; Great Britain	Javad Aghayev; Azerbaijan
Lightweight (−74 kg)	Daniel Quesada; Spain	Edival Pontes; Brazil	Firas Katoussi; Tunisia
Lightweight (−74 kg)	Daniel Quesada; Spain	Edival Pontes; Brazil	Stefan Takov; Serbia
Welterweight (−80 kg)	Park Woo-hyeok; South Korea	Andoni Cintado; Spain	Mehran Barkhordari; Iran
Welterweight (−80 kg)	Park Woo-hyeok; South Korea	Andoni Cintado; Spain	Seif Eissa; Egypt
Middleweight (−87 kg)	Mehdi Khodabakhshi; Serbia	Meng Mingkuan; China	Nikita Rafalovich; Uzbekistan
Middleweight (−87 kg)	Mehdi Khodabakhshi; Serbia	Meng Mingkuan; China	Bryan Salazar; Mexico
Heavyweight (+87 kg)	Carlos Sansores; Mexico	Iván García; Spain	Sajjad Mardani; Iran
Heavyweight (+87 kg)	Carlos Sansores; Mexico	Iván García; Spain	Song Zhaoxiang; China

=== Women ===
Event	Gold	Silver	Bronze
Finweight (−46 kg)	Lena Stojković; Croatia	Rukiye Yıldırım; Turkey	Huang Ying-hsuan; Chinese Taipei
Finweight (−46 kg)	Lena Stojković; Croatia	Rukiye Yıldırım; Turkey	Andrea Ramírez; Colombia
Flyweight (−49 kg)	Daniela Souza; Mexico	Guo Qing; China	Dunya Abutaleb; Saudi Arabia
Flyweight (−49 kg)	Daniela Souza; Mexico	Guo Qing; China	Panipak Wongpattanakit; Thailand
Bantamweight (−53 kg)	Makayla Greenwood; United States	Zuo Ju; China	Tijana Bogdanović; Serbia
Bantamweight (−53 kg)	Makayla Greenwood; United States	Zuo Ju; China	Ivana Duvančić; Croatia
Featherweight (−57 kg)	Luo Zongshi; China	Lo Chia-ling; Chinese Taipei	Jade Jones; Great Britain
Featherweight (−57 kg)	Luo Zongshi; China	Lo Chia-ling; Chinese Taipei	Hatice Kübra İlgün; Turkey
Lightweight (−62 kg)	Sarah Chaâri; Belgium	Theopoula Sarvanaki; Greece	Aaliyah Powell; Great Britain
Lightweight (−62 kg)	Sarah Chaâri; Belgium	Theopoula Sarvanaki; Greece	Feruza Sadikova; Uzbekistan
Welterweight (−67 kg)	Leslie Soltero; Mexico	Aleksandra Perišić; Serbia	Cecilia Castro; Spain
Welterweight (−67 kg)	Leslie Soltero; Mexico	Aleksandra Perišić; Serbia	Milena Titoneli; Brazil
Middleweight (−73 kg)	Nadica Božanić; Serbia	Lee Da-bin; South Korea	Crystal Weekes; Puerto Rico
Middleweight (−73 kg)	Nadica Božanić; Serbia	Lee Da-bin; South Korea	Rebecca McGowan; Great Britain
Heavyweight (+73 kg)	Svetlana Osipova; Uzbekistan	Dana Azran; Israel	Lorena Brandl; Germany
Heavyweight (+73 kg)	Svetlana Osipova; Uzbekistan	Dana Azran; Israel	Marlene Jahl; Austria

== Team ranking ==
Source :

=== Men ===
Rank	Team	Points
1	South Korea	345
2	Spain	273
3	Mexico	242
4	China	217
5	Serbia	157
6	Italy	135
7	Hungary	133
8	Uzbekistan	97
9	Iran	87
10	Brazil	77

=== Women ===
Rank	Team	Points
1	Mexico	272
2	China	255
3	Serbia	213
4	Croatia	173
5	Uzbekistan	162
6	United States	143
7	Belgium	130
8	Turkey	97
9	Chinese Taipei	94
10	Great Britain	86

== Participating nations ==
A total of 710 athletes from 120 nations and the refugee team participated.

- Albania (1)
- Andorra (1)
- Argentina (4)
- Aruba (2)
- Australia (16)
- Austria (4)
- Azerbaijan (8)
- Belgium (4)
- Bolivia (2)
- Bosnia and Herzegovina (1)
- Brazil (16)
- Bulgaria (4)
- Burkina Faso (1)
- Cambodia (1)
- Canada (16)
- Cape Verde (2)
- Chad (5)
- Chile (6)
- China (15)
- Chinese Taipei (16)
- Colombia (13)
- Congo DR (1)
- Costa Rica (6)
- Croatia (14)
- Cuba (8)
- Curaçao (1)
- Cyprus (2)
- Czech Republic (5)
- Denmark (6)
- Dominican Republic (12)
- East Timor (1)
- Ecuador (2)
- Egypt (10)
- El Salvador (3)
- Equatorial Guinea (1)
- Eswatini (1)
- Finland (5)
- France (8)
- Gabon (10)
- Gambia (1)
- Georgia (3)
- Germany (10)
- Ghana (8)
- Great Britain (12)
- Greece (15)
- Guatemala (1)
- Guinea (8)
- Guinea-Bissau (1)
- Haiti (5)
- Honduras (9)
- Hong Kong (7)
- Hungary (3)
- Iceland (1)
- India (1)
- Indonesia (3)
- Iran (14)
- Iraq (2)
- Ireland (2)
- Israel (10)
- Italy (8)
- Ivory Coast (14)
- Jamaica (1)
- Japan (12)
- Jordan (8)
- Kazakhstan (15)
- Kenya (14)
- Kosovo (2)
- Latvia (2)
- Lebanon (4)
- Lesotho (1)
- Liberia (1)
- Lithuania (3)
- Luxembourg (1)
- Malaysia (1)
- Mali (4)
- Martinique (1)
- Mexico (16)
- Moldova (2)
- Mongolia (3)
- Montenegro (1)
- Morocco (12)
- Nepal (3)
- Netherlands (2)
- Nicaragua (4)
- Niger (15)
- Nigeria (1)
- North Macedonia (3)
- Norway (6)
- Palestine (3)
- Panama (2)
- Paraguay (2)
- Philippines (6)
- Poland (5)
- Portugal (4)
- Puerto Rico (13)
- Refugee Taekwondo Athletes (6)
- San Marino (2)
- São Tomé and Príncipe (1)
- Saudi Arabia (4)
- Senegal (4)
- Serbia (10)
- Slovakia (1)
- Slovenia (4)
- Somalia (2)
- South Korea (16)
- Spain (16)
- Sri Lanka (8)
- Suriname (2)
- Sweden (6)
- Switzerland (1)
- Thailand (8)
- Trinidad and Tobago (4)
- Tunisia (5)
- Turkey (16)
- Ukraine (7)
- United States (16)
- Uruguay (2)
- Uzbekistan (16)
- Venezuela (4)
- Vietnam (3)
- Zimbabwe (1)
