= Bradly Sinden =

British taekwondo practitioner

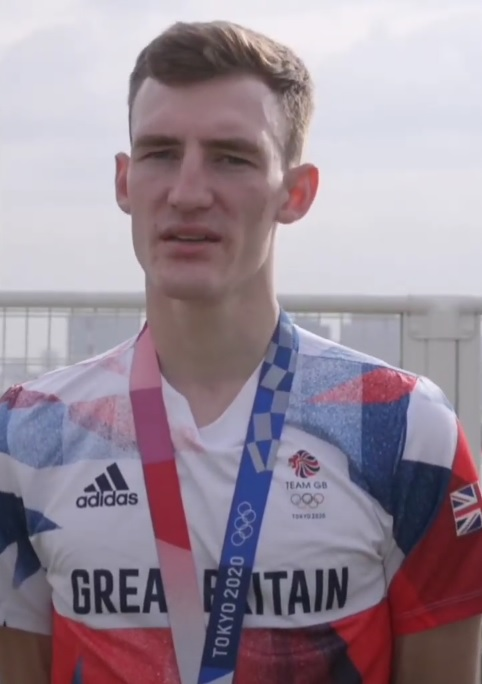
- Sinden at the 2020 Summer Olympics

Personal information
- Full name: Bradly John Sinden
- Nationality: British
- Born: 19 September 1998 (age 28) Doncaster, England, United Kingdom
- Height: 185 cm (6 ft 1 in)
- Weight: 68 kg (150 lb)
- Spouse: Rebecca McGowan

Sport
- Sport: Taekwondo
- Weight class: Featherweight
- College team: Loughborough College
- Team: GB Taekwondo
- Coached by: Martin Stamper (national)
Medal record
Men's taekwondo
Representing Great Britain
Olympic Games
Silver medal – second place	2020 Tokyo	68 kg
World Championships
Gold medal – first place	2019 Manchester	68 kg
Gold medal – first place	2023 Baku	68 kg
Silver medal – second place	2022 Guadalajara	68 kg
Bronze medal – third place	2017 Muju	63 kg
Grand Slam
Silver medal – second place	2018 Wuxi	68 kg
Grand Prix
Silver medal – second place	2017 London	68 kg
Silver medal – second place	2018 Moscow	68 kg
Silver medal – second place	2019 Moscow (F)	68 kg
Bronze medal – third place	2018 Rome	68 kg
Bronze medal – third place	2018 Manchester	68 kg
Bronze medal – third place	2019 Rome	68 kg
Bronze medal – third place	2022 Rome	68 kg
Bronze medal – third place	2022 Paris	68 kg
Bronze medal – third place	2022 Manchester	68 kg
European Games
Silver medal – second place	2023 Kraków-Małopolska	68 kg
European Championships
Gold medal – first place	2022 Manchester	68 kg
Gold medal – first place	2024 Belgrade	68 kg
Silver medal – second place	2021 Sofia	68 kg
Bronze medal – third place	2018 Kazan	63 kg
European Junior Championships
Gold medal – first place	2015 Daugavpils	63 kg

Bradly John Sinden (born 19 September 1998) is a British Taekwondo athlete who won gold at the 2019 World Taekwondo Championships, becoming the first British male World Taekwondo champion.

At the following 2020 Summer Olympics, he reached the final in his weight category where he won a silver medal, losing 34–29 against Ulugbek Rashitov. Sinden's medal was the first medal guaranteed for Great Britain at the 2020 Summer Olympics when he qualified for the 68 kg final, although judoku Chelsie Giles was the first to actually have the colour of her medal confirmed and medal awarded.

He won the silver medal in the men's featherweight event at the 2022 World Taekwondo Championships held in Guadalajara, Mexico before taking his first European title in Manchester in 2022.

At the 2024 Summer Olympics, Sinden lost in the semi-finals and withdrew from his bronze medal match due to injury.
