= Hakan Reçber =

Turkish taekwondo practitioner

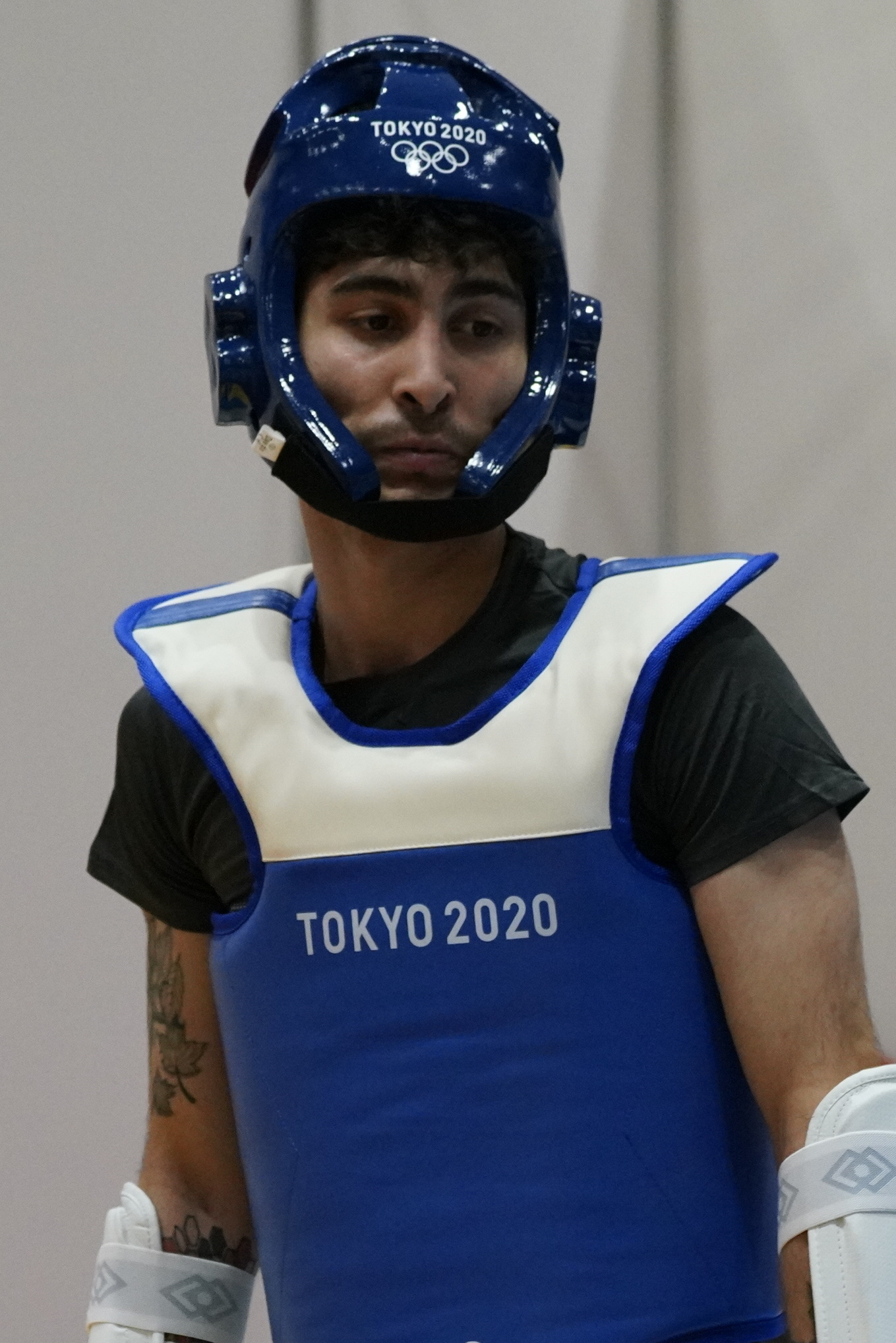
- Reçber at the Tokyo 2020 Summer Olympics

Personal information
- Born: 17 August 1999 (age 26) Ankara, Turkey
- Home town: Ankara, Turkey
- Height: 180 cm (5 ft 11 in)
- Weight: 63 kg (139 lb)

Sport
- Country: Turkey
- Sport: Taekwondo
- Event: 63–68 kg
- Club: Istanbul BB SK
- Coached by: Servet Tazegül
Medal record
Men's taekwondo
Representing Turkey
Olympic Games
Bronze medal – third place	2020 Tokyo	68 kg
World Championships
Gold medal – first place	2023 Baku	63 kg
European Championships
Gold medal – first place	2021 Sofia	63 kg
Gold medal – first place	2022 Manchester	63 kg
Silver medal – second place	2018 Kazan	63 kg
Silver medal – second place	2024 Belgrade	63 kg
Grand Prix
Gold medal – first place	2022 Rome	68 kg
Bronze medal – third place	2022 Riyadh (F)	68 kg
Islamic Solidarity Games
Silver medal – second place	2021 Konya	63 kg
Mediterranean Games
Silver medal – second place	2022 Oran	68 kg
Bronze medal – third place	2018 Tarragona	68 kg
Grand Slam (Qualification)
Gold medal – first place	2018 Wuxi (I)	68 kg
World Junior Championships
Gold medal – first place	2016 Burnaby	59 kg
World University Games
Gold medal – first place	2021 Chengdu	68 kg

Hakan Reçber (born 17 August 1999) is a Turkish taekwondo athlete. He won the gold medal in the men's bantamweight event at the 2023 World Taekwondo Championships held in Baku, Azerbaijan. He is an Olympic bronze medalist in the Men's 68 kg competition. He won the gold medal at the 2021 European Taekwondo Championships and 2022 European Taekwondo Championships on the bantamweight (−63 kg) category.

== Career ==
Hakan Reçber brought Turkey its first medal at the Tokyo 2020 Olympics on Sunday. The 21-year-old taekwondoin beat Bosnia's Nedzad Husic in the 68-kilogram third-place match at the Makuhari Messe Event Hall. Reçber made a great start to the tie, winning the first round 14–5, but the second and third round ended in a 3–3, 5–5 draw respectively. But the Turkish athlete secured the match with a total score of 22–13.

Hakan Reçber won the gold medal in the men's 63 kg event at the 2022 European Taekwondo Championships held in Manchester, England. He clinched gold at the 2022 World Taekwondo Grand Prix. Reçber defeated Ali Alian from Sweden to take the top prize in Rome during the men's 68 kg event final. Hakan Recber first Turk to clinch gold in Grand Prix's male category.

He won the silver medal in the men's 68 kg event at the 2022 Mediterranean Games held in Oran, Algeria.

Hakan Reçber won the gold medal by defeating Ralph Honeine of Lebanon in the second round, Dennis Baretta of Italy in the third round, Yushuai Liang of China in the quarterfinals and Carlos Navarro of Mexico in the semifinals at the 2023 World Taekwondo Championships in Baku, Azerbaijan. In the 63 kg final, he defeated Banlung Tumtimdang of Thailand to win the gold medal and become the world champion.

== Tournament record ==
Year	Event	Location	G-Rank	Place
2023	World Championships	(Azerbaijan) Baku	G-12	1st
2022	Grand Prix Final	(Saudi Arabia) Riyadh	G-10	3rd
2022	Grand Prix	(Italy) Rome	G-6	1st
2022	European Championships	(United Kingdom) Manchester	G-4	1st
2022	Turkish Open	(Turkey) Antalya	G-2	1st
2022	Islamic Solidarity Games	(Turkey) Konya	G-1	2nd
2022	Mediterranean Games	(Algeria) Oran	G-1	2nd
2021	Olympic Games	(Japan) Tokyo	G-20	3rd
2021	European Championships	(Bulgaria) Sofia	G-4	1st
2021	Olympic Games qualification Europe	(Bulgaria) Sofia	G-1	1st
2021	Albania Open	(Albania) Tirana	G-1	1st
2021	Bosnia Herzegovina Open	(Bosnia and Herzegovina) Sarajevo	G-1	1st
2021	Turkish Open	(Turkey) Istanbul	G-1	2nd
2019	European U-21 Championships	(Sweden) Helsingborg	G-4	3rd
2019	US Open	(United States) Las Vegas	G-1	1st
2019	Belgian Open	(Belgium) Lommel	G-1	2nd
2019	Spanish Open	(Spain) Castellon	G-1	3rd
2018	European Championships	(Russia) Kazan	G-4	2nd
2018	Grand Slam – Qualification	(China) Wuxi	G-1	1st
2018	European Clubs Championships	(Turkey) Istanbul	G-1	1st
2018	Turkish Open	(Turkey) Istanbul	G-1	1st
2018	Spanish Open	(Spain) Alicante	G-1	1st
2017	European U-21 Championships	(Bulgaria) Sofia	G-4	1st
2017	European Clubs Championships	(Turkey) Antalya	G-1	2nd
2017	Dutch Open	(Germany) Eindhoven	G-1	3rd
2016	World Junior Championships	(Canada) Burnaby	G-12	1st
2016	WT Presidents Cup – Europe	(Germany) Bonn	G-1	1st
2016	German Open	(Germany) Hamburg	G-1	2nd
2015	European Clubs Championships	(Turkey) Antalya	G-1	3rd
2014	Serbia Open	(Serbia) Belgrad	G-1	3rd
