= Imran Özkaya =

German taekwondo practitioner

Personal information
- Born: 16 July 1999 (age 26) Ulm, Germany
- Height: 181 cm (5 ft 11 in)
- Weight: 63 kg (139 lb)

Sport
- Country: Germany
- Sport: Taekwondo
- Event(s): –63 kg, –68 kg
- Club: Taekwondo Varol Neu-Ulm
- Coached by: Senol Varol

Achievements and titles
- Highest world ranking: 16 (2023)
Medal record
Representing Germany
Men's taekwondo
European Championships
Gold medal – first place	2023 Tallinn	68 kg
Bronze medal – third place	2022 Manchester	63 kg
European U21 Championships
Bronze medal – third place	2019 Helsingborg	63 kg
- Updated on 21 July 2024

Imran Özkaya (born 16 July 1999) is a German taekwondo athlete.

== Career ==
Imran Özkaya is an athlete in the Olympic kyorugi taekwondo discipline and has been competing in international tournaments since 2012. In 2019, he won his first major medal at an international competition with a bronze medal at the U21 European Championships in Helsingborg.

Özkaya took part in the 2021 European Taekwondo Championships in Sofia in the under 68 kg competition, but did not reach the podium. In 2022, he won one of the bronze medals in the 63 kg weight class at the 2022 European Taekwondo Championships held in Manchester, England.

Özkaya competed at the World Championships in Guadalajara and Baku in 2022 and 2023 as well as the 2023 European Games in Kraków. At the 2023 Multi European Games in Sarajevo he claimed second place in the weight class up to 63 kg.

In Tallinn, Estonia, Özkaya won the gold medal in the men's -68 kg competition at the 2023 European Taekwondo Championships in the olympic weight classes.

In March 2024, he participated in the European qualification tournament for the Summer Olympic Games in Paris, where he lost to Zinedin Becovic from Montenegro in the quarter-finals. He therefore did not qualify a quota place for the 68 kg weight category at the Olympic Games, as this would have required him to reach the final.

== Personal life ==
Özkaya is a Soldier-Athlete (German: Sportsoldat) with the sports promotion group of the Bundeswehr (German: Sportfördergruppe der Bundeswehr).
