= Théo Lucien =

French taekwondo practitioner (born 2001)

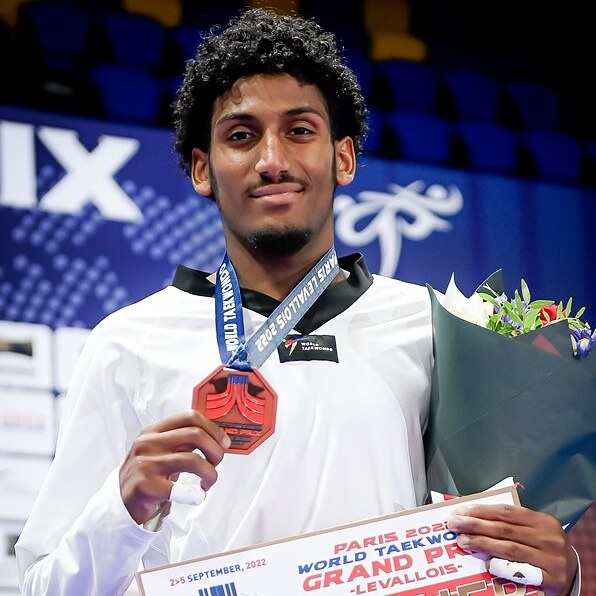
- Lucien in 2022

Personal information
- Nationality: French
- Born: 22 October 2001 (age 24)

Sport
- Sport: Taekwondo
- Weight class: 68 kg
Medal record
Men's taekwondo
Representing France
European Championships
Bronze medal – third place	2022 Manchester	68 kg
World University Games
Bronze medal – third place	2025 Rhine-Ruhr	Team Kyorugi

Théo Lucien (born 22 October 2001) is a French taekwondo practitioner.

== Career ==
Lucien competed at the 2022 European Taekwondo Championships and won a bronze medal in the 68 kg category.

In July 2025, he competed at the 2025 Summer World University Games and won a bronze medal in the team kyorugi event, as the discipline made its debut as a medal event.
