= Joan Jorquera =

Spanish taekwondo practitioner

Personal information
- Nationality: Spanish
- Born: Joan Jorquera Cala; 14 July 2000 (age 25) Roses, Girona, Spain
- Weight: 63 kg (139 lb)

Sport
- Country: Spain
- Sport: Taekwondo
- Event: 63 kg
- Club: Taekwondo Joan's
- Coached by: Juan Jorquera Navarro
Medal record
Men's taekwondo
Representing Spain
World Championships
Bronze medal – third place	2022 Guadalajara	63 kg
European Games
Bronze medal – third place	2023 Kraków-Małopolska	63 kg
European Championships
Silver medal – second place	2021 Sofia	63 kg
Bronze medal – third place	2022 Manchester	63 kg
European Junior Championships
Bronze medal – third place	2015 Daugavpils	45 kg

Joan Jorquera Cala (Note: In this Spanish name, the first or paternal surname is Jorquera and the second or maternal family name is Cala.) (born 14 July 2000) is a Spanish taekwondo athlete. He won one of the bronze medals in the men's bantamweight event at the 2022 World Taekwondo Championships held in Guadalajara, Mexico. He won the silver medal in his debut at the European Taekwondo Championships men's under 63 kg.
