= 2022 World Taekwondo Championships – Men's finweight =

Men's finweight at the 2022 World Championships
- Venue: Centro Acuático CODE Metropolitano
- Dates: 19 November 2022
- Competitors: 48 from 48 nations

Medalists
gold medal	Omar Salim	Hungary
silver medal	César Rodríguez	Mexico
bronze medal	Bae Jun-seo	South Korea
bronze medal	Chen Po-yen	Chinese Taipei

The men's finweight is a competition featured at the 2022 World Taekwondo Championships, and was held at the Centro Acuático CODE Metropolitano in Guadalajara, Mexico on 19 November 2022. Finweights were limited to a maximum of 54 kilograms in body mass.

== Results ==
Legend

- DQ — Won by disqualification
- P — Won by punitive declaration

=== Finals ===
Semifinals				Final
Bae Jun-seo (KOR)	10	11	4
César Rodríguez (MEX)	15	5	5	César Rodríguez (MEX)	3	9
Omar Salim (HUN)	10	6	3	Omar Salim (HUN)	14	11
Chen Po-yen (TPE)	2	7	1

=== Top half ===
==== Section 1 ====
Round of 64
Ramnarong Sawekwiharee (THA)	16	14
Edward Espinosa (DOM)	6	2
Hamza El-Hacham (MAR)	D	Q
~~Admire Tshitshiliza (ZIM)~~
Zhou Xiao (CHN)	7	8
Sayyad Dadashov (AZE)	6	4
Kariel Cruz (PUR)	0	3
Benjamin Camua (AUS)	13	10

Round of 32
Mahamadou Amadou (NIG)	5	2	2
Ramnarong Sawekwiharee (THA)	4	3	3
~~Hamza El-Hacham (MAR)~~
Bae Jun-seo (KOR)	D	Q
Mehdi Haji Mousaei (IRI)	6	3	2
Zhou Xiao (CHN)	0	4	8
Benjamin Camua (AUS)	1	4
Paulo Melo (BRA)	15	16

Round of 16
Ramnarong Sawekwiharee (THA)	5	5
Bae Jun-seo (KOR)	18	8
Zhou Xiao (CHN)	1	1
Paulo Melo (BRA)	7	5

Quarterfinals
Bae Jun-seo (KOR)	1	5
Paulo Melo (BRA)	0	5

==== Section 2 ====
Round of 64
Saúl Gutiérrez (CRC)	3	3
Baye Ndiaye (SEN)	3	6
Hugo Arillo (ESP)	12	12
Ian Alonzo (HON)	0	0
Tamirlan Tleules (KAZ)	1	6	10
Ebrahim Marwan (SWE)	10	1	2
Ryuta Matsui (JPN)	4	2	5
Yosthin Menacho (BOL)	5	2	3

Round of 32
Nicholas Hoefling (CAN)	5	4	7
Baye Ndiaye (SEN)	6	0	3
Hugo Arillo (ESP)	6	1
Deniz Dağdelen (TUR)	8	4
Khaled Abdel-Halim (GER)	4	0
Tamirlan Tleules (KAZ)	4	8
Ryuta Matsui (JPN)	6	0	2
César Rodríguez (MEX)	6	6	5

Round of 16
Nicholas Hoefling (CAN)	6	10
Deniz Dağdelen (TUR)	5	7
Tamirlan Tleules (KAZ)	4	10	4
César Rodríguez (MEX)	10	6	7

Quarterfinals
Nicholas Hoefling (CAN)	0	2
César Rodríguez (MEX)	8	9

=== Bottom half ===
==== Section 3 ====
Round of 64
Sebastian Tan (MAS)	4	6
Relja Ivković (SRB)	1	1
Konstantinos Dimitropoulos (GRE)	D	Q
~~Daniel Dziwe (KEN)~~
~~Lonceny Sanoh (GUI)~~
Kurt Bryan Barbosa (PHI)	D	Q
Jakhongir Khudayberdiev (UZB)	D	Q
~~Alex Kumi (GHA)~~

Round of 32
Omar Salim (HUN)	11	14
Sebastian Tan (MAS)	0	1
Konstantinos Dimitropoulos (GRE)	12	8
Melvy Alvarez (USA)	8	3
Andrés Moreno (COL)	0	0
Kurt Bryan Barbosa (PHI)	13	4
Jakhongir Khudayberdiev (UZB)	11	7
Fahad Al-Samih (KSA)	0	6

Round of 16
Omar Salim (HUN)	12	11^{P}
Konstantinos Dimitropoulos (GRE)	0	0
Kurt Bryan Barbosa (PHI)	12	5	15
Jakhongir Khudayberdiev (UZB)	0	9	2

Quarterfinals
Omar Salim (HUN)	10	8	15
Kurt Bryan Barbosa (PHI)	3	9	6

==== Section 4 ====
Round of 64
Chen Po-yen (TPE)	13	12
Thomas Mansell (NCA)	0	2
Loay Ihmedan (JOR)	15	11
Amílcar Larreynaga (ESA)	13	1
~~Sumit Bist (NEP)~~
Zack Sarsoza (GBR)	D	Q
Akely Matos (CUB)	6	10
Lionel Saizonou (GAB)	2	0

Round of 32
Tom Pashcovsky (ISR)	2	10	1
Chen Po-yen (TPE)	3	5	12^{P}
Loay Ihmedan (JOR)	8	7	4
Milan Molle (NED)	6	9	2
Domen Molj (SLO)	5	10
Zack Sarsoza (GBR)	4	2
Akely Matos (CUB)	6	1
Josip Teskera (CRO)	9	8

Round of 16
Chen Po-yen (TPE)	5	0	14
Loay Ihmedan (JOR)	3	5	7
Domen Molj (SLO)	0	2
Josip Teskera (CRO)	1	5

Quarterfinals
Chen Po-yen (TPE)	6	13
Josip Teskera (CRO)	2	8
