= 2013 World Taekwondo Championships – Men's finweight =

Taekwondo competition

Men's finweight at the 2013 World Championships
- Venue: Exhibition Center of Puebla
- Dates: 18 July 2013
- Competitors: 53 from 53 nations

Medalists
gold medal	Kim Tae-hun	South Korea
silver medal	Hsu Chia-lin	Chinese Taipei
bronze medal	Jerranat Nakaviroj	Thailand
bronze medal	Hussein Sherif	Egypt

The men's finweight is a competition featured at the 2013 World Taekwondo Championships, and was held at the Exhibition Center of Puebla in Puebla, Mexico on July 18. Finweights were limited to a maximum of 54 kilograms in body mass.

== Results ==
- DQ — Won by disqualification
- P — Won by punitive declaration
- W — Won by withdrawal

=== Finals ===
Semifinals		Final
Jerranat Nakaviroj (THA)	4
Kim Tae-hun (KOR)	10	Kim Tae-hun (KOR)	7
Hussein Sherif (EGY)	3	Hsu Chia-lin (TPE)	0
Hsu Chia-lin (TPE)	5

=== Top half ===
==== Section 1 ====
Round of 64
~~Manuel de Carvalho (ANG)~~
João Miguel Neto (BRA)	DQ
Georgios Simitsis (GRE)	13
Takaya Nakagawa (JPN)	16
Terrance Asare (GHA)	DQ
~~Ulukbek Murataliev (KGZ)~~
Molomyn Tümenbayar (MGL)	3
Mourad Laachraoui (BEL)	4
Arun Adhikari (NEP)	20
Doten Dorji (BHU)	5

Round of 32
Seyfula Magomedov (RUS)	4
João Miguel Neto (BRA)	2
Takaya Nakagawa (JPN)	16
Terrance Asare (GHA)	2
Jerranat Nakaviroj (THA)	14
Mourad Laachraoui (BEL)	2
Arun Adhikari (NEP)	1
Ahmad Nabil (INA)	13

Round of 16
Seyfula Magomedov (RUS)	11
Takaya Nakagawa (JPN)	8
Jerranat Nakaviroj (THA)	10
Ahmad Nabil (INA)	7

Quarterfinals
Seyfula Magomedov (RUS)	3
Jerranat Nakaviroj (THA)	4

==== Section 2 ====
Round of 64
Shokan Yerzhanov (KAZ)	6
Leeroy Ucungi (UGA)	1
Boniface Mbonigaba (RWA)	0
Jorge Ramos (CHI)	17
Kim Tae-hun (KOR)	12
Adrián Cifuentes (ESP)	0
Edward Espinosa (DOM)	13
Sven Lorrimer (GUY)	1
~~Khalid Al-Malki (KSA)~~
Nidal Abarahou (FRA)	DQ
Pedro Anco (PER)	1
Ehsan Naghibzadeh (IRI)	9

Round of 32
Sergej Kolb (GER)	8
Shokan Yerzhanov (KAZ)	3
Jorge Ramos (CHI)	4
Kim Tae-hun (KOR)	11
Edward Espinosa (DOM)	13
Nidal Abarahou (FRA)	1
Ehsan Naghibzadeh (IRI)	1
César Rodríguez (MEX)	13

Round of 16
Sergej Kolb (GER)	2
Kim Tae-hun (KOR)	12
Edward Espinosa (DOM)	0
César Rodríguez (MEX)	17

Quarterfinals
Kim Tae-hun (KOR)	6
César Rodríguez (MEX)	5

=== Bottom half ===
==== Section 3 ====
Round of 64
Mehmet Dolaş (TUR)	12
Edi Serbanescu (ISR)	6
Nguyễn Hữu Nhân (VIE)	3
Muatasem Abuzaid (JOR)	10
Cameron Sutton (AUS)	1
Emanuele Riemma (ITA)	2
Mika Kalikat (COD)	1
Tyler Muscat (CAN)	5
Logan Gerick (USA)	14
Chan Chon In (MAC)	5

Round of 32
Hussein Sherif (EGY)	5
Mehmet Dolaş (TUR)	2
Muatasem Abuzaid (JOR)	10
Emanuele Riemma (ITA)	6
Ilia Kokshyntsau (BLR)	6
Tyler Muscat (CAN)	7
Logan Gerick (USA)	7
Duván Avella (COL)	13

Round of 16
Hussein Sherif (EGY)	3
Muatasem Abuzaid (JOR)	1
Tyler Muscat (CAN)	13
Duván Avella (COL)	8

Quarterfinals
Hussein Sherif (EGY)	6
Tyler Muscat (CAN)	0

==== Section 4 ====
Round of 64
~~Mustapha Abakar (CHA)~~
Namogo Koné (CIV)	DQ
Cleiver Olaizola (VEN)	6
Lovre Brečić (CRO)	10
Varag Aghajanyan (ARM)	W
Giorgio Janmaat (NED)
Mayko Votta (URU)	3
Luis Gaitán (PAN)	5
Arnold Owone (GAB)	2
Huang Zhongkun (CHN)	14

Round of 32
Hsu Chia-lin (TPE)	17
Namogo Koné (CIV)	3
Lovre Brečić (CRO)	2
Mikayil Aliyev (AZE)	3
Varag Aghajanyan (ARM)	1
Luis Gaitán (PAN)	2
Huang Zhongkun (CHN)	10^{P}
Japoy Lizardo (PHI)	4

Round of 16
Hsu Chia-lin (TPE)	7
Mikayil Aliyev (AZE)	5
Luis Gaitán (PAN)	4
Huang Zhongkun (CHN)	17

Quarterfinals
Hsu Chia-lin (TPE)	6
Huang Zhongkun (CHN)	2
