= 2023 World Taekwondo Championships – Men's finweight =

Men's finweight at the 2023 World Championships
- Venue: Baku Crystal Hall
- Dates: 2 June 2023
- Competitors: 54 from 52 nations

Medalists
gold medal	Park Tae-joon	South Korea
silver medal	Hugo Arillo	Spain
bronze medal	Omonjon Otajonov	Uzbekistan
bronze medal	Görkem Polat	Turkey

The men's finweight is a competition featured at the 2023 World Taekwondo Championships, and was held at the Baku Crystal Hall in Baku, Azerbaijan on 2 June 2023. Welterweights were limited to a maximum of 54 kilograms in body mass.

== Results ==
Legend

- R — Won by referee stop contest
- W — Won by withdrawal

=== Finals ===
Semifinals				Final
Park Tae-joon (KOR)	5	8	18
Omonjon Otajonov (UZB)	5	2	8	Park Tae-joon (KOR)	8	6
Görkem Polat (TUR)	1	7		Hugo Arillo (ESP)	0	3
Hugo Arillo (ESP)	15	9

=== Top half ===
==== Section 1 ====
Round of 64
Hristiyan Georgiev (BUL)	2	1
Idar Bagov (AIN)	8	13
Kurt Bryan Barbosa (PHI)	16	14
Süleyman Vizdiklar (KOS)	6	2
Mohammad Ramin Amini (AFG)	8	6
Park Tae-joon (KOR)	17	19
Yahor Kazlou (AIN)	13	10
Sebastian Tan (MAS)	0	1
Youssef Mansour (EGY)	10	5	12
Data Akhaladze (GEO)	8	8	3

Round of 32
Josip Teskera (CRO)	6	6	0
Idar Bagov (AIN)	9	3	12
Kurt Bryan Barbosa (PHI)	8	7
Park Tae-joon (KOR)	16	9
Shahzaib Khan (PAK)	8	18	19
Yahor Kazlou (AIN)	9	6	22
Youssef Mansour (EGY)	1	3
Konstantinos Dimitropoulos (GRE)	7	10

Round of 16
Idar Bagov (AIN)	3	6
Park Tae-joon (KOR)	4	7
Yahor Kazlou (AIN)	3	2
Konstantinos Dimitropoulos (GRE)	4	7

Quarterfinals
Park Tae-joon (KOR)	7	13
Konstantinos Dimitropoulos (GRE)	3	1

==== Section 2 ====
Round of 64
Norberto Benítez (PUR)	1	2
Ibrahima Diallo (CIV)	14	12
Aman Kumar Kadyan (IND)	13	26	6
Sirawit Mahamad (THA)	14	13	9
Jake Buhagiar (AUS)	12	3	8
Milan Molle (NED)	11	15	14
Khaled Abdel-Halim (GER)	11	12
Maxwell Manson (SLE)	0	0
Benumugisha Guy Caleb (BDI)	0	5
Zhavokhirkhon Islamov (KAZ)	13	18
Omonjon Otajonov (UZB)	15	7	12
Brayan Garrido (COL)	3	8	0

Round of 32
Tom Pashcovsky (ISR)	15	14
Ibrahima Diallo (CIV)	2	2
Sirawit Mahamad (THA)	6	13
Milan Molle (NED)	1	4
Khaled Abdel-Halim (GER)	9	17
Zhavokhirkhon Islamov (KAZ)	7	14
Omonjon Otajonov (UZB)	10	4
Sayyad Dadashov (AZE)	4	2

Round of 16
Tom Pashcovsky (ISR)	8	8	7
Sirawit Mahamad (THA)	9	8	21
Khaled Abdel-Halim (GER)	0	2
Omonjon Otajonov (UZB)	3	12

Quarterfinals
Sirawit Mahamad (THA)	11	9
Omonjon Otajonov (UZB)	14	12

=== Bottom half ===
==== Section 3 ====
Round of 64
Sultan Al-Ali (UAE)	4	3
Riad Hamdi (KSA)	11	4
Loay Ihmedan (JOR)	7	13	12
Nurkhan Samidinov (KGZ)	9	7	13
Wang Deshuang (CHN)	1	9	4
Domen Molj (SLO)	3	3	3
Görkem Polat (TUR)	11	13
Anas Al-Dabba (PLE)	1	3
Sumit Bist (NEP)	3	1
Chen Po-yen (TPE)	8	11
Adrián Miranda (ECU)	17	4	16
Wataru Morikawa (JPN)	11	7	17

Round of 32
Nicholas Hoefling (CAN)	3	8
Riad Hamdi (KSA)	15	11
Nurkhan Samidinov (KGZ)	2	13
Wang Deshuang (CHN)	2	8
Görkem Polat (TUR)	3	6	12
Chen Po-yen (TPE)	3	5	3
Wataru Morikawa (JPN)	1	10
César Rodríguez (MEX)	13	23

Round of 16
Riad Hamdi (KSA)	2^{R}
Nurkhan Samidinov (KGZ)	1
Görkem Polat (TUR)	3	5	12
César Rodríguez (MEX)	2	6	11

Quarterfinals
Riad Hamdi (KSA)
Görkem Polat (TUR)	W

==== Section 4 ====
Round of 64
Mfanawekhaya Dube (SWZ)	1	2
Bleron Ademi (SWE)	15	16
Hugo Arillo (ESP)	9	8
Solomon Demse (ETH)	5	5
Melvy Alvarez (USA)	15	14
Gregory Jean-Baptiste (HAI)	2	2
Pedro Ferreira (POR)	0	2
Hatim Berrouhou (MAR)	13	12
Yosthin Menacho (BOL)	0	0
Teodoro Del Vecchio (ITA)	14	12

Round of 32
Paulo Melo (BRA)	6	9	10
Bleron Ademi (SWE)	6	1	3
Hugo Arillo (ESP)	7	3	6
Mehdi Haji Mousaei (IRI)	7	4	6
Melvy Alvarez (USA)	2	13	0
Hatim Berrouhou (MAR)	13	8	4
Teodoro Del Vecchio (ITA)	4	4	4
Mahamadou Amadou (NIG)	5	3	2

Round of 16
Paulo Melo (BRA)	6	4	4
Hugo Arillo (ESP)	3	6	5
Hatim Berrouhou (MAR)	4	8
Teodoro Del Vecchio (ITA)	12	13

Quarterfinals
Hugo Arillo (ESP)	9	7
Teodoro Del Vecchio (ITA)	7	4
