= 2019 World Taekwondo Championships – Men's flyweight =

Men's flyweight at the 2019 World Championships
- Venue: Manchester Arena
- Dates: 15–16 May 2019
- Competitors: 59 from 58 nations

Medalists
gold medal	Jang Jun	South Korea
silver medal	Brandon Plaza	Mexico
bronze medal	Rui Bragança	Portugal
bronze medal	Lucas Guzmán	Argentina

The men's flyweight is a competition featured at the 2019 World Taekwondo Championships, and was held at the Manchester Arena in Manchester, United Kingdom on 15 and 16 May. Flyweights were limited to a maximum of 58 kilograms in body mass.

== Results ==
Legend

- P — Won by punitive declaration
- R — Won by referee stop contest

=== Finals ===
Semifinals		Final
Rui Bragança (POR)	13
Brandon Plaza (MEX)	16	Brandon Plaza (MEX)	9
Jang Jun (KOR)	14	Jang Jun (KOR)	25
Lucas Guzmán (ARG)	3

=== Top half ===
==== Section 1 ====
Round of 64
Ali Asiri (KSA)	15
Yauheni Anushkevich (BLR)	26
Gashim Magomedov (AZE)	18
Abdullahi Mohamed (SWE)	8
Valdet Allaraj (ALB)	15
Zaid Kareem (JOR)	36
Mourad Laachraoui (BEL)	12
Ralph Hneineh (LBN)	11
Haroon Khan (PAK)	25
Mateusz Nowak (POL)	13
Jorge Ramos (CHI)	30
Jake Salgado (PUR)	14
Dmytro Dzandzava (UKR)	5
Rui Bragança (POR)	18

Round of 32
Jesús Tortosa (ESP)	21
Yauheni Anushkevich (BLR)	1
Gashim Magomedov (AZE)	30
Zaid Kareem (JOR)	14
Mourad Laachraoui (BEL)	28
Haroon Khan (PAK)	33
Jorge Ramos (CHI)	7
Rui Bragança (POR)	10

Round of 16
Jesús Tortosa (ESP)	13
Gashim Magomedov (AZE)	15
Haroon Khan (PAK)	9
Rui Bragança (POR)	10

Quarterfinals
Gashim Magomedov (AZE)	4
Rui Bragança (POR)	7

==== Section 2 ====
Round of 64
Jefferson Ochoa (COL)	4
Mohammad Hassan Palangafkan (IRI)	15
Mohamed Farag (EGY)	33
Bar Reuben (ISR)	14
Dex Ian Chavez (PHI)	11
Eleftherios Fakinos (GRE)	9
Brandon Plaza (MEX)	28^{P}
Danielius Djačekas (LTU)	0
Kemal Külük (TUR)	20
Molomyn Tümenbayar (MGL)	22
Luis Oblitas (PER)	5
Yeldos Yskak (KAZ)	29

Round of 32
Tawin Hanprab (THA)	15
Mohammad Hassan Palangafkan (IRI)	17
Mohamed Farag (EGY)	34
Dex Ian Chavez (PHI)	14
Brandon Plaza (MEX)	32
Molomyn Tümenbayar (MGL)	21
Yeldos Yskak (KAZ)	21
Hassan Haider (GBR)	12

Round of 16
Mohammad Hassan Palangafkan (IRI)	9
Mohamed Farag (EGY)	10
Brandon Plaza (MEX)	39
Yeldos Yskak (KAZ)	20

Quarterfinals
Mohamed Farag (EGY)	20
Brandon Plaza (MEX)	40

=== Bottom half ===
==== Section 3 ====
Round of 64
Leon Glasnović (CRO)	28
Kyliann Bonnet (FRA)	33
Liam Bette (FGT)	29
Frederico Muianga (MOZ)	8
Jean Paul Sekanyambo (RWA)	7
Omar Lakehal (MAR)	37
Stepan Dimitrov (MDA)	8^{R}
Jakub Hudák (SVK)	4
Eduardo Baretta (BRA)	11
Antonio Flecca (ITA)	4
Meisam Rafiei (ISL)	13
Amir Mohammad Hosseini (WT)	15
Muhammad Bassam Raihan (INA)	1
Safwan Khalil (AUS)	9

Round of 32
Jang Jun (KOR)	21
Kyliann Bonnet (FRA)	17
Liam Bette (FGT)	1
Omar Lakehal (MAR)	22
Stepan Dimitrov (MDA)	18
Eduardo Baretta (BRA)	17
Amir Mohammad Hosseini (WT)	3
Safwan Khalil (AUS)	14

Round of 16
Jang Jun (KOR)	27
Omar Lakehal (MAR)	6
Stepan Dimitrov (MDA)	12
Safwan Khalil (AUS)	5

Quarterfinals
Jang Jun (KOR)	27
Stepan Dimitrov (MDA)	7

==== Section 4 ====
Round of 64
Jack Woolley (IRL)	29
Manoj Malla (NEP)	8
Aleksandr Galaktionov (EST)	5
Sukhrob Bobobekov (UZB)	24
Liang Yushuai (CHN)	15
Hsu Hao-yu (TPE)	17
Ko Chung Hon (HKG)	6
Hedi Neffati (TUN)	26
Dmitrij Nagajev (SRB)	21
Shabib Al-Wahaibi (OMA)	17
Yohan Chang (CAN)	25
Damián Villa (USA)	19
Marumo Moloisane (LES)	5
Lucas Guzmán (ARG)	25

Round of 32
Jack Woolley (IRL)	33
Sukhrob Bobobekov (UZB)	13
Hsu Hao-yu (TPE)	16
Hedi Neffati (TUN)	17
Dmitrij Nagajev (SRB)	26
Yohan Chang (CAN)	27
Lucas Guzmán (ARG)	13
Mikhail Artamonov (RUS)	4

Round of 16
Jack Woolley (IRL)	14
Hedi Neffati (TUN)	24
Yohan Chang (CAN)	18
Lucas Guzmán (ARG)	22

Quarterfinals
Hedi Neffati (TUN)	10
Lucas Guzmán (ARG)	11
