= 2019 World Taekwondo Championships – Men's finweight =

Men's finweight at the 2019 World Championships
- Venue: Manchester Arena
- Dates: 16–17 May 2019
- Competitors: 59 from 59 nations

Medalists
gold medal	Bae Jun-seo	South Korea
silver medal	Georgy Popov	Russia
bronze medal	Paulo Melo	Brazil
bronze medal	Armin Hadipour	Iran

The men's finweight is a competition featured at the 2019 World Taekwondo Championships, and was held at the Manchester Arena in Manchester, United Kingdom on 16 and 17 May. Finweights were limited to a maximum of 54 kilograms (119.05 pounds; 8.5 stones) in body mass.

== Results ==
Legend

- DQ — Won by disqualification
- P — Won by punitive declaration
- R — Won by referee stop contest
- W — Won by withdrawal

=== Finals ===
Semifinals		Final
Paulo Melo (BRA)	16
Bae Jun-seo (KOR)	34^{P}	Bae Jun-seo (KOR)	53
Georgy Popov (RUS)	20	Georgy Popov (RUS)	24
Armin Hadipour (IRI)	14

=== Top half ===
==== Section 1 ====
Round of 64
Cédric Genest (CAN)	6
Ouyang Xiongbin (CHN)	19
Bailey Lewis (AUS)	23
Mohamed Saleh Juma (BRN)	3
David-Emmanuel Thézénas (GDL)	4
Joan Nuñez (PUR)	29
David Kim (USA)	11
Seiya Higashijima (JPN)	16
Kitso True Molaodi (BOT)	11
Samat Temirkhan (KAZ)	24
Heiner Oviedo (CRC)	29
Tömörbaataryn Bilegsaikhan (MGL)	27
Cole Krech-Watene (NZL)	2
Paulo Melo (BRA)	25

Round of 32
Moustapha Kama (SEN)	23
Ouyang Xiongbin (CHN)	12
Bailey Lewis (AUS)	25
Joan Nuñez (PUR)	5
Seiya Higashijima (JPN)	16
Samat Temirkhan (KAZ)	13
Heiner Oviedo (CRC)	8
Paulo Melo (BRA)	19

Round of 16
Moustapha Kama (SEN)	13
Bailey Lewis (AUS)	17
Seiya Higashijima (JPN)	10
Paulo Melo (BRA)	16

Quarterfinals
Bailey Lewis (AUS)	16
Paulo Melo (BRA)	34

==== Section 2 ====
Round of 64
Duván Avella (COL)	19
Elord Gjana (ALB)	17
Abdulelah Asiri (KSA)	22
Benoit Kayitare (RWA)	17
Ágúst Eðvarðsson (ISL)	2
Bae Jun-seo (KOR)	43
Moaz Nabil (EGY)	16
Wong Yiu Pan (HKG)	1
Ali Al-Mershad (KUW)	DQ
~~Mohamed Khalil Jendoubi (TUN)~~
Amin El-Harmazi (MAR)	19
Josip Teskera (CRO)	11

Round of 32
Vito Dell'Aquila (ITA)	34
Duván Avella (COL)	7
Abdulelah Asiri (KSA)	14
Bae Jun-seo (KOR)	43
Moaz Nabil (EGY)	50
Ali Al-Mershad (KUW)	16
Amin El-Harmazi (MAR)	13
Mason Yarrow (GBR)	33

Round of 16
Vito Dell'Aquila (ITA)	33
Bae Jun-seo (KOR)	52^{P}
Moaz Nabil (EGY)	4
Mason Yarrow (GBR)	26

Quarterfinals
Bae Jun-seo (KOR)	40
Mason Yarrow (GBR)	7

=== Bottom half ===
==== Section 3 ====
Round of 64
Ismaël Mekene Coulibaly (CIV)	10
Georgy Popov (RUS)	30
Hüseyin Alperen Canan (GER)	16
Abdelrahman Abu El-Samen (JOR)	19
Antreas Lysandrou (CYP)	2
Jorge Hernández (MEX)	53^{W}
Taras Malchenko (UKR)	20
Mark Khalife (LBN)	0
Karolis Budėnas (LTU)	5
Edward Espinosa (DOM)	22
Hsu Hao-chen (TPE)	30
Linus Dahllund (SWE)	5
Radwan Houssein Hassan (DJI)	7
Dionysios Rapsomanikis (GRE)	27

Round of 32
Adrián Vicente (ESP)	16
Georgy Popov (RUS)	21
Abdelrahman Abu El-Samen (JOR)	29
Jorge Hernández (MEX)	27
Taras Malchenko (UKR)	12
Edward Espinosa (DOM)	11
Hsu Hao-chen (TPE)	30
Dionysios Rapsomanikis (GRE)	27

Round of 16
Georgy Popov (RUS)	35^{P}
Abdelrahman Abu El-Samen (JOR)	4
Taras Malchenko (UKR)	25
Hsu Hao-chen (TPE)	29

Quarterfinals
Georgy Popov (RUS)	41
Hsu Hao-chen (TPE)	1

==== Section 4 ====
Round of 64
Ramnarong Sawekwiharee (THA)	35
Kurt Bryan Barbosa (PHI)	24
Shahzaib Khan (PAK)	28
Bahruz Guluzade (AZE)	19
Valentin Khegay (UZB)	19
Tobias Hyttel (DEN)	21
Ernesto Muianga (MOZ)	9
Deniz Dağdelen (TUR)	32
Vadim Dimitrov (MDA)	17
Tomás Rivero (ARG)	14
Abdullah Al-Wahaibi (OMA)	1
Adil Belkadi (NED)	22^{R}
Maharana Amadou (NIG)	27
Adrián Miranda (ECU)	12

Round of 32
Ramnarong Sawekwiharee (THA)	37
Shahzaib Khan (PAK)	15
Tobias Hyttel (DEN)	14
Deniz Dağdelen (TUR)	25
Vadim Dimitrov (MDA)	18
Adil Belkadi (NED)	16
Maharana Amadou (NIG)	9
Armin Hadipour (IRI)	20

Round of 16
Ramnarong Sawekwiharee (THA)	17
Deniz Dağdelen (TUR)	16
Vadim Dimitrov (MDA)	1
Armin Hadipour (IRI)	24

Quarterfinals
Ramnarong Sawekwiharee (THA)	6
Armin Hadipour (IRI)	26
