= 2017 World Taekwondo Championships – Men's finweight =

Taekwondo competition

Men's finweight at the 2017 World Championships
- Venue: Taekwondowon
- Dates: 24–25 June 2017
- Competitors: 64 from 64 nations

Medalists
gold medal	Kim Tae-hun	South Korea
silver medal	Armin Hadipour	Iran
bronze medal	Vito Dell'Aquila	Italy
bronze medal	Ramnarong Sawekwiharee	Thailand

The men's finweight is a competition featured at the 2017 World Taekwondo Championships, and was held at the Taekwondowon in Muju County, South Korea on June 24 and 25. Finweights were limited to a maximum of 54 kilograms in body mass.

== Results ==
Legend

- DQ — Won by disqualification
- P — Won by punitive declaration
- W — Won by withdrawal

=== Finals ===
Semifinals		Final
Vito Dell'Aquila (ITA)	0
Kim Tae-hun (KOR)	16^{P}	Kim Tae-hun (KOR)	10
Armin Hadipour (IRI)	25	Armin Hadipour (IRI)	6
Ramnarong Sawekwiharee (THA)	23

=== Top half ===
==== Section 1 ====
Round of 64
Jack Woolley (IRL)	DQ
~~Maharana Amadou (NIG)~~
Sukhrob Bobobekov (UZB)	11
Adrián Vicente (ESP)	14
Ilia Kokshyntsau (BLR)	DQ
~~Chirilo Aleu Bol Kuot (SSD)~~
Benson Addo (GHA)	8
Adriano Alves (BRA)	30
Gashim Magomedov (AZE)	17
Georges Nakhle (LBN)	1
~~Iskender Osmonov (KGZ)~~
Vito Dell'Aquila (ITA)	DQ
Backer Barreto (PER)	13
Elord Gjana (ALB)	18^{P}
Adama Ballo (MLI)	10
Moustapha Kama (SEN)	13

Round of 32
Jack Woolley (IRL)	17
Adrián Vicente (ESP)	37
Ilia Kokshyntsau (BLR)	5
Adriano Alves (BRA)	9
Gashim Magomedov (AZE)	10
Vito Dell'Aquila (ITA)	20
Elord Gjana (ALB)	11
Moustapha Kama (SEN)	8

Round of 16
Adrián Vicente (ESP)	7
Adriano Alves (BRA)	15
Vito Dell'Aquila (ITA)	21
Elord Gjana (ALB)	1

Quarterfinals
Adriano Alves (BRA)	1
Vito Dell'Aquila (ITA)	21

==== Section 2 ====
Round of 64
Moaz Nabil (EGY)	31
Jordy Araujo (ECU)	20
Austin Tran (USA)	3
Fahad Al-Samih (KSA)	6
Deniz Dağdelen (TUR)	25
Admire Tshitshiliza (ZIM)	1
Issa Diakité (CIV)	5
Bailey Lewis (AUS)	25
Joan Nuñez (PUR)	18
Adim Bin Kareem (LBA)	14
~~Marckenson Altidor (HAI)~~
Hassan Haider (GBR)	DQ
Ryuta Matsui (JPN)	24
Navin Arikrisnasamy (MAS)	21
Kitso True Molaodi (BOT)	2
Kim Tae-hun (KOR)	15^{P}

Round of 32
Moaz Nabil (EGY)	34
Fahad Al-Samih (KSA)	21
Deniz Dağdelen (TUR)	18
Bailey Lewis (AUS)	8
Joan Nuñez (PUR)	11
Hassan Haider (GBR)	13
Ryuta Matsui (JPN)	3
Kim Tae-hun (KOR)	29

Round of 16
Moaz Nabil (EGY)	9
Deniz Dağdelen (TUR)	21
Hassan Haider (GBR)	3
Kim Tae-hun (KOR)	28

Quarterfinals
Deniz Dağdelen (TUR)	7
Kim Tae-hun (KOR)	27

=== Bottom half ===
==== Section 3 ====
Round of 64
Armin Hadipour (IRI)	31
Anshuman Parashar (IND)	5
Ng Ming Wei (SGP)	14
Solomon Demsea (ETH)	26
Reinaldy Atmanegara (INA)	19
Ouyang Xiongbin (CHN)	17
Zamir Holguín (COL)	3
Vladimir Gritsenko (RUS)	22
Dionysios Rapsomanikis (GRE)	DQ
~~Serdar Gurtgeldiýew (TKM)~~
Tara Kumar Rayamajhi (NEP)	17
Edward Espinosa (DOM)	39
Andrius Klemas (LTU)	16
Cleiver Olaizola (VEN)	30
~~Collins Munene (KEN)~~
Mourad Laachraoui (BEL)	DQ

Round of 32
Armin Hadipour (IRI)	22
Solomon Demsea (ETH)	15
Reinaldy Atmanegara (INA)	13
Vladimir Gritsenko (RUS)	12
Dionysios Rapsomanikis (GRE)	20
Edward Espinosa (DOM)	13
Cleiver Olaizola (VEN)	6
Mourad Laachraoui (BEL)	19

Round of 16
Armin Hadipour (IRI)	24
Reinaldy Atmanegara (INA)	3
Dionysios Rapsomanikis (GRE)	5
Mourad Laachraoui (BEL)	9

Quarterfinals
Armin Hadipour (IRI)	17
Mourad Laachraoui (BEL)	9

==== Section 4 ====
Round of 64
Ramnarong Sawekwiharee (THA)	DQ
~~Emmanuel Kaggwa (UGA)~~
Alfonso Dias Miqueias (TLS)	10
Jenar Torillos (PHI)	21^{P}
Anas Sghir (CAN)	23
Hashim El-Nour (SUD)	3
Besfort Berisha (KOS)	5
Taras Malchenko (UKR)	31
Vadim Dimitrov (MDA)	26
Lino Chinama (FGT)	10
Võ Quốc Hưng (VIE)	22
Daniel Chiovetta (GER)	14
Wang Chen-yu (TPE)	30
Sapargali Abdirashev (KAZ)	16
~~Athumani Omar Mussa (TAN)~~
César Rodríguez (MEX)	DQ

Round of 32
Ramnarong Sawekwiharee (THA)	39
Jenar Torillos (PHI)	20
Anas Sghir (CAN)	21
Taras Malchenko (UKR)	19
Vadim Dimitrov (MDA)	10
Võ Quốc Hưng (VIE)	15
Wang Chen-yu (TPE)	28
César Rodríguez (MEX)	31

Round of 16
Ramnarong Sawekwiharee (THA)	22^{W}
Anas Sghir (CAN)	5
Võ Quốc Hưng (VIE)	11
César Rodríguez (MEX)	16

Quarterfinals
Ramnarong Sawekwiharee (THA)	21
César Rodríguez (MEX)	13
