= 2015 World Taekwondo Championships – Men's finweight =

Taekwondo competition

Men's finweight at the 2015 World Championships
- Venue: Traktor Ice Arena
- Dates: 15–16 May 2015
- Competitors: 67 from 66 nations

Medalists
gold medal	Kim Tae-hun	South Korea
silver medal	Stanislav Denisov	Russia
bronze medal	Venilton Teixeira	Brazil
bronze medal	Ramnarong Sawekwiharee	Thailand

The men's finweight is a competition featured at the 2015 World Taekwondo Championships, and was held at the Traktor Ice Arena in Chelyabinsk, Russia on May 15 and May 16. Finweights were limited to a maximum of 54 kilograms in body mass.

== Results ==
Legend

- DQ — Won by disqualification
- R — Won by referee stop contest

=== Finals ===
Quarterfinals		Semifinals		Final
Venilton Teixeira (BRA)	21
Jack Woolley (IRL)	7	Venilton Teixeira (BRA)	17
Mourad Laachraoui (WTF)	8	Stanislav Denisov (RUS)	20
Stanislav Denisov (RUS)	10			Stanislav Denisov (RUS)	7
Ramnarong Sawekwiharee (THA)	13			Kim Tae-hun (KOR)	14
Takaya Nakagawa (JPN)	8	Ramnarong Sawekwiharee (THA)	2
Mohammad Kazemi (IRI)	10	Kim Tae-hun (KOR)	6
Kim Tae-hun (KOR)	11

=== Top half ===
==== Section 1 ====
Round of 128
Fabricio Arévalo (ECU)	1
Wei I-yuan (TPE)	10

Round of 64
César Rodríguez (MEX)	7
Wei I-yuan (TPE)	10
Antonio Flecca (ITA)	8
Sarvarbek Sheraliev (UZB)	11
Venilton Teixeira (BRA)	10
Adil Al-Wahaibi (OMA)	4
~~Ng Ming Wei (SIN)~~
Max Cater (GBR)	DQ

Round of 32
Wei I-yuan (TPE)	3
Sarvarbek Sheraliev (UZB)	4
Venilton Teixeira (BRA)	22
Max Cater (GBR)	9

Round of 16
Sarvarbek Sheraliev (UZB)	7
Venilton Teixeira (BRA)	11

==== Section 2 ====
Round of 128

Round of 64
Mikayil Aliyev (AZE)	10
Daler Almatov (TJK)	7
Hong Xinxin (CHN)	6
Molomyn Tümenbayar (MGL)	5
Jack Woolley (IRL)	12
Kaloyan Binev (BUL)	4
Aleksandr Kuwarzin (TKM)	14
Logan Gerick (USA)	8

Round of 32
Mikayil Aliyev (AZE)	9
Hong Xinxin (CHN)	8
Jack Woolley (IRL)	8
Aleksandr Kuwarzin (TKM)	6

Round of 16
Mikayil Aliyev (AZE)	13
Jack Woolley (IRL)	21

==== Section 3 ====
Round of 128

Round of 64
Stepan Dimitrov (MDA)	13
Nilton Corte-Real (TLS)	1
Nguyễn Đình Cường (VIE)	6
Arnold Owone (GAB)	5
Malik Abu Al-Rob (PLE)	DQ
~~Danial Azri (MAS)~~
~~Youcef Khalfallah (ALG)~~
Mourad Laachraoui (WTF)	DQ

Round of 32
Stepan Dimitrov (MDA)	13
Nguyễn Đình Cường (VIE)	0
Malik Abu Al-Rob (PLE)	8
Mourad Laachraoui (WTF)	15

Round of 16
Stepan Dimitrov (MDA)	2
Mourad Laachraoui (WTF)	9

==== Section 4 ====
Round of 128

Round of 64
Camilo Pérez (CHI)	DQ
~~Léon Randriamahavonjy (MAD)~~
Maksym Sukhomlin (UKR)	3
Mehmet Dolaş (TUR)	7
~~Joan Nuñez (PUR)~~
Lehlohonolo Motumi (LES)	DQ
Stéphane Audibert (FRA)	8
Stanislav Denisov (RUS)	13

Round of 32
Camilo Pérez (CHI)	11
Mehmet Dolaş (TUR)	7
Lehlohonolo Motumi (LES)	4
Stanislav Denisov (RUS)	17

Round of 16
Camilo Pérez (CHI)	7
Stanislav Denisov (RUS)	8

=== Bottom half ===
==== Section 5 ====
Round of 128
Hussein Raheem (IRQ)	23
Som Dandotiya (IND)	5

Round of 64
Jesús Tortosa (ESP)	12
Hussein Raheem (IRQ)	5
Martin Nduwayezu (RWA)	10
Soufyan Akabbouz (NED)	14
Ramnarong Sawekwiharee (THA)	8
Jenar Torillos (PHI)	4
~~Mohamed Al-Obeidili (UAE)~~
Marko Maljković (CRO)	DQ

Round of 32
Jesús Tortosa (ESP)	14
Soufyan Akabbouz (NED)	2
Ramnarong Sawekwiharee (THA)	18
Marko Maljković (CRO)	8

Round of 16
Jesús Tortosa (ESP)	5
Ramnarong Sawekwiharee (THA)	6

==== Section 6 ====
Round of 128

Round of 64
Georgios Simitsis (GRE)	DQ
~~Terrance Asare (GHA)~~
Solomon Demse (ETH)	10
Takaya Nakagawa (JPN)	15
Moustapha Kama (SEN)	12
Rommel Quintanilla (PER)	2
~~Yahya Ayash (YEM)~~
Duván Avella (COL)	DQ

Round of 32
Georgios Simitsis (GRE)	12
Takaya Nakagawa (JPN)	21
Moustapha Kama (SEN)	12
Duván Avella (COL)	14

Round of 16
Takaya Nakagawa (JPN)	16
Duván Avella (COL)	13

==== Section 7 ====
Round of 128

Round of 64
Sergej Kolb (GER)	12
Aaron Kobenan (CIV)	7
~~César Martínez (DOM)~~
Abdul Wahab Zazai (AFG)	DQ
Mohammad Kazemi (IRI)	15
Georgios Nicolaou (CYP)	5
Ulukbek Murataliev (KGZ)	2
Tyler Muscat (CAN)	9

Round of 32
Sergej Kolb (GER)	8
Abdul Wahab Zazai (AFG)	9
Mohammad Kazemi (IRI)	15
Tyler Muscat (CAN)	0

Round of 16
Abdul Wahab Zazai (AFG)	6
Mohammad Kazemi (IRI)	19

==== Section 8 ====
Round of 128
Bailey Lewis (AUS)	11
Yeldos Yskak (KAZ)	10

Round of 64
Muatasem Abuzaid (JOR)	DQ
~~Alfred Madome (BOT)~~
~~Hashim El-Nour (SUD)~~
Ilia Kokshyntsau (BLR)	DQ
Gadi Haimovitz (ISR)	8
Moaz Nabil (EGY)	6
Bailey Lewis (AUS)	0
Kim Tae-hun (KOR)	6^{R}

Round of 32
Muatasem Abuzaid (JOR)	8
Ilia Kokshyntsau (BLR)	5
Gadi Haimovitz (ISR)	2
Kim Tae-hun (KOR)	15

Round of 16
Muatasem Abuzaid (JOR)	2
Kim Tae-hun (KOR)	15
