= Georgy Popov =

Georgy Popov may refer to:

- Georgy Popov (politician) (1906–1968), Soviet politician
- Georgy Popov (taekwondo) (born 2001), Russian taekwondo athlete
