= Taekwondo at the 2022 South American Games =

Taekwondo competitions at the 2022 South American Games

- Venue: Pavilion 2 of SND
- Dates: October 5−7
- Nations: 14

Taekwondo competitions at the 2022 South American Games in Asunción, Paraguay were held between October 5 and 7, 2022 at the Pavilion 2 of SND.

== Schedule ==
The competition schedule is as follows:

F	Final

Men
Date Event	Wed 5	Thu 6	Fri 7
Men's individual poomsae	F		
Men's 58 kg	F		
Men's 68 kg		F	
Men's 80 kg			F
Men's +80 kg			F

Mixed
Date Event	Wed 5	Thu 6	Fri 7
Mixed poomsae pairs		F	
Mixed poomsae freestyle teams			F

Women
Date Event	Wed 5	Thu 6	Fri 7
Women's individual poomsae	F		
Women's 49 kg	F		
Women's 57 kg		F	
Women's 67 kg			F
Women's +67 kg			F

== Medal summary ==
=== Medal table ===
* Host nation (Paraguay)

Rank	Nation	Gold	Silver	Bronze	Total
1	Brazil (BRA)	4	5	1	10
2	Colombia (COL)	3	1	8	12
3	Peru (PER)	2	1	2	5
4	Ecuador (ECU)	1	1	3	5
5	Chile (CHI)	1	0	1	2
6	Panama (PAN)	1	0	0	1
7	Venezuela (VEN)	0	3	2	5
8	Argentina (ARG)	0	1	5	6
9	Uruguay (URU)	0	0	2	2
Totals (9 entries)		12	12	24	48

=== Medalists ===
==== Men ====
Event	Gold	Silver	Bronze
Men's 58 kg	Paulo Melo; Brazil	Yohandri Granado; Venezuela	Jefferson Ochoa; Colombia
Men's 58 kg	Paulo Melo; Brazil	Yohandri Granado; Venezuela	Lucas Guzmán; Argentina
Men's 68 kg	Ignacio Morales; Chile	Edival Pontes; Brazil	Federico Gómez; Uruguay
Men's 68 kg	Ignacio Morales; Chile	Edival Pontes; Brazil	David Paz; Colombia
Men's 80 kg	Miguel Trejos; Colombia	Henrique Fernandes; Brazil	Kenny Lejarazo; Venezuela
Men's 80 kg	Miguel Trejos; Colombia	Henrique Fernandes; Brazil	Dylan Olmedo; Argentina
Men's +80 kg	Ícaro Miguel Soares; Brazil	Luis Álvarez; Venezuela	Jesús Perea; Ecuador
Men's +80 kg	Ícaro Miguel Soares; Brazil	Luis Álvarez; Venezuela	Luis Soto; Colombia
Men's individual poomsae	Hugo del Castillo; Peru	Isaac Vélez; Colombia	Alex Arruda; Brazil
Men's individual poomsae	Hugo del Castillo; Peru	Isaac Vélez; Colombia	Fernando Salgado; Ecuador

==== Women ====
Event	Gold	Silver	Bronze
Women's 49 kg	Andrea Ramírez; Colombia	Talisca Reis; Brazil	María Lieghio; Uruguay
Women's 49 kg	Andrea Ramírez; Colombia	Talisca Reis; Brazil	Giulia Sendra; Argentina
Women's 57 kg	Sandy Macedo; Brazil	Camila Caceres; Peru	Daniela Múñoz; Colombia
Women's 57 kg	Sandy Macedo; Brazil	Camila Caceres; Peru	Carla Godoy; Argentina
Women's 67 kg	Milena Titoneli; Brazil	Mell Mina; Ecuador	Katherine Dumar; Colombia
Women's 67 kg	Milena Titoneli; Brazil	Mell Mina; Ecuador	Claudia Gallardo; Chile
Women's +67 kg	Gloria Mosquera; Colombia	Gabriele Siqueira; Brazil	Matvelin Espinoza; Ecuador
Women's +67 kg	Gloria Mosquera; Colombia	Gabriele Siqueira; Brazil	Carolina Fernández; Venezuela
Women's individual poomsae	Daniela Rodríguez; Panama	Margarita Echeverría; Argentina	Carmela de la Barra; Peru
Women's individual poomsae	Daniela Rodríguez; Panama	Margarita Echeverría; Argentina	Laura Olarte; Colombia

==== Mixed ====
Event	Gold	Silver	Bronze
Mixed poomsae pairs	Krishna Cortez; Luis Sacha; Peru	Alex Arruda; Lina Bacelar; Brazil	Leandro Rodríguez; Dariana Suache; Colombia
Mixed poomsae pairs	Krishna Cortez; Luis Sacha; Peru	Alex Arruda; Lina Bacelar; Brazil	Margarita Echeverría; Ruben Guagliarello; Argentina
Mixed poomsae freestyle teams	Andee Campos; Fernando Salgado; Katlen Jerves; Mario Troya; Paula Poveda; Ecuador	Alvy Piña; Andres Albers; Bryan González; Fernanda Melillo; Paola Farías; Venezuela	Álvaro Pinto; Carmela de la Barra; Hugo del Castillo; Krishna Cortez; Luis Sacha; Peru
Mixed poomsae freestyle teams	Andee Campos; Fernando Salgado; Katlen Jerves; Mario Troya; Paula Poveda; Ecuador	Alvy Piña; Andres Albers; Bryan González; Fernanda Melillo; Paola Farías; Venezuela	Dariana Suache; Isaac Vélez; Juan Bustamante; Laura Olarte; Leandro Rodríguez; Colombia

== Participation ==
Fourteen nations participated in taekwondo events of the 2022 South American Games.

- Argentina
- Aruba
- Bolivia
- Brazil
- Chile
- Colombia
- Curaçao
- Ecuador
- Panama
- Paraguay
- Peru
- Suriname
- Uruguay
- Venezuela
