= Taekwondo at the 2018 Summer Youth Olympics – Boys' 55 kg =

Taekwondo competition

Boys' 55 kg at the III Summer Youth Olympic Games
- Venue: Parque Polideportivo Roca
- Date: 8 October 2018
- Competitors: 13 from 13 nations

Medalists
1st place, gold medalist(s)		Georgii Popov	Russia
2nd place, silver medalist(s)		Kim Kang-min	South Korea
3rd place, bronze medalist(s)		Mahamadou Amadou	Niger
3rd place, bronze medalist(s)		Zaid Kareem	Jordan

The boys' 55 kg competition at the 2018 Summer Youth Olympics was held on 8 October at the Oceania Pavilion.

== Schedule ==
All times are in local time (UTC-3).

Date	Time	Round
Monday, 8 October 2018	14:15; 16:15; 19:15; 20:15	Round of 16; Quarterfinals; Semifinals; Final

== Bracket ==
Round of 16
9	Mason Yarrow (GBR)	6
8	Hidetaka Maeda (JPN)	29
5	Bogdan Bulat (SRB)	7
12	Mahamadou Amadou (NIG)	19
13	Sulayman Alqade (LBN)	4
4	José Acuña (ARG)	13
11	Nicalas Fernandes (CPV)	DSQ
6	Hugo Arillo (ESP)
7	Kim Kang-min (KOR)	33
10	Daniel Goichman (ISR)	11

Quarterfinals
1	Georgii Popov (RUS)	34
8	Hidetaka Maeda (JPN)	13
12	Mahamadou Amadou (NIG)	10
4	José Acuña (ARG)	7
3	Zaid Kareem (JOR)	25
6	Hugo Arillo (ESP)	5
7	Kim Kang-min (KOR)	23
2	Georgios Ioannou (GRE)	15

Semifinals
1	Georgii Popov (RUS)	33
12	Mahamadou Amadou (NIG)	13
3	Zaid Kareem (JOR)	16
7	Kim Kang-min (KOR)	31

Gold medal match
1	Georgii Popov (RUS)	33
7	Kim Kang-min (KOR)	26

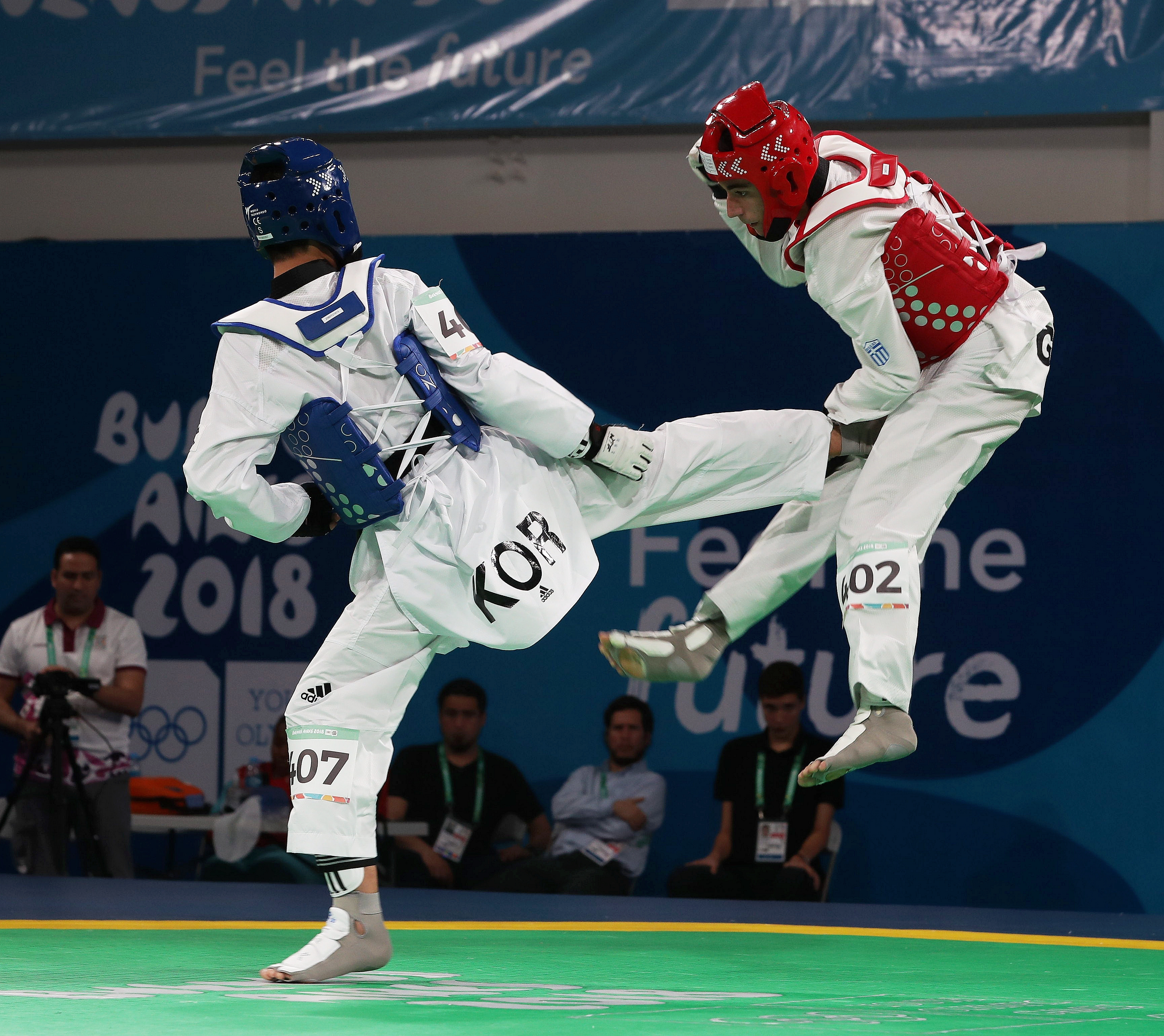
Kim Kang-min (left) vs. Georgios Ioannou

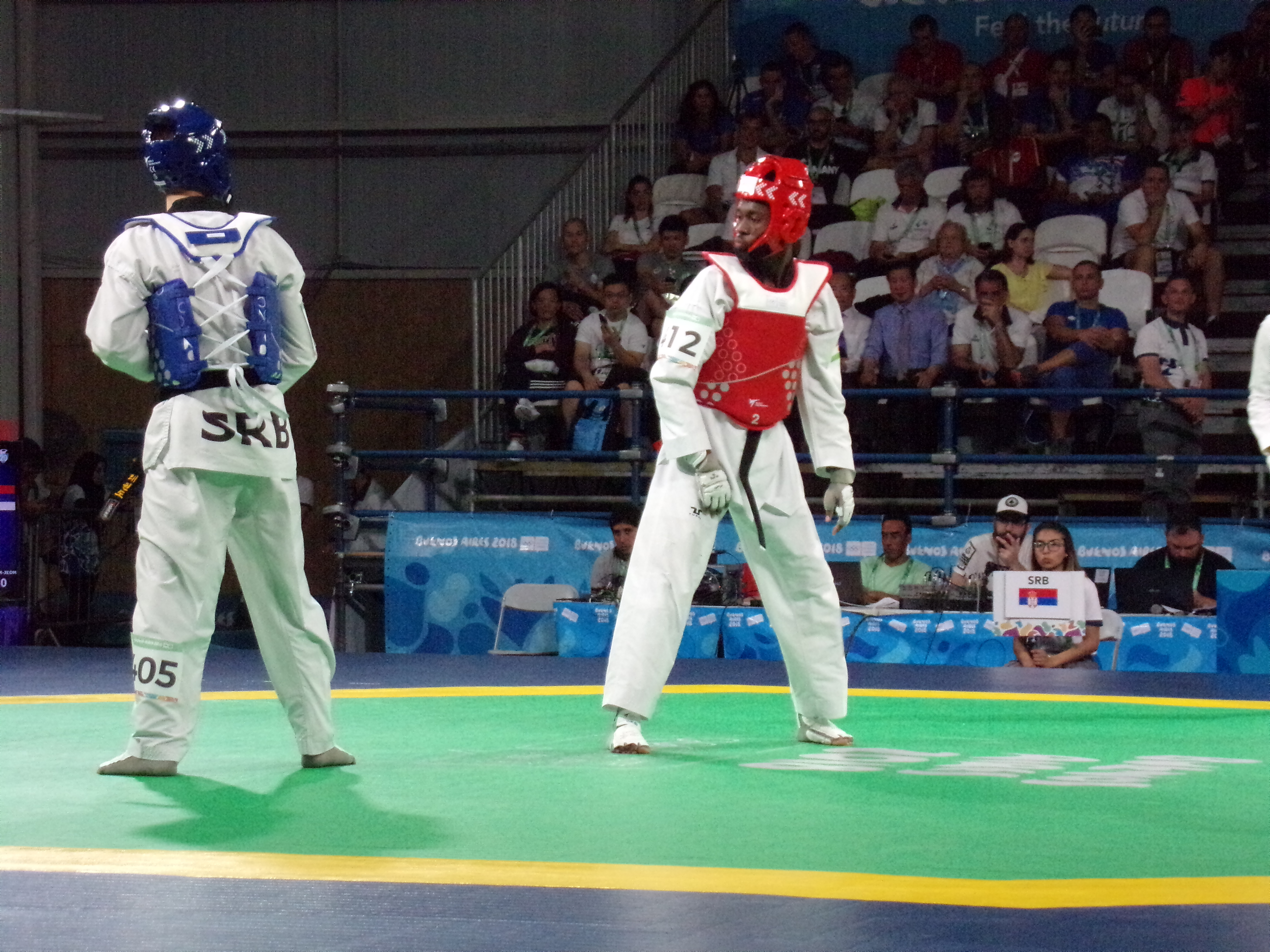
Bogdan Bulat vs. Mahamadou Amadou (right)

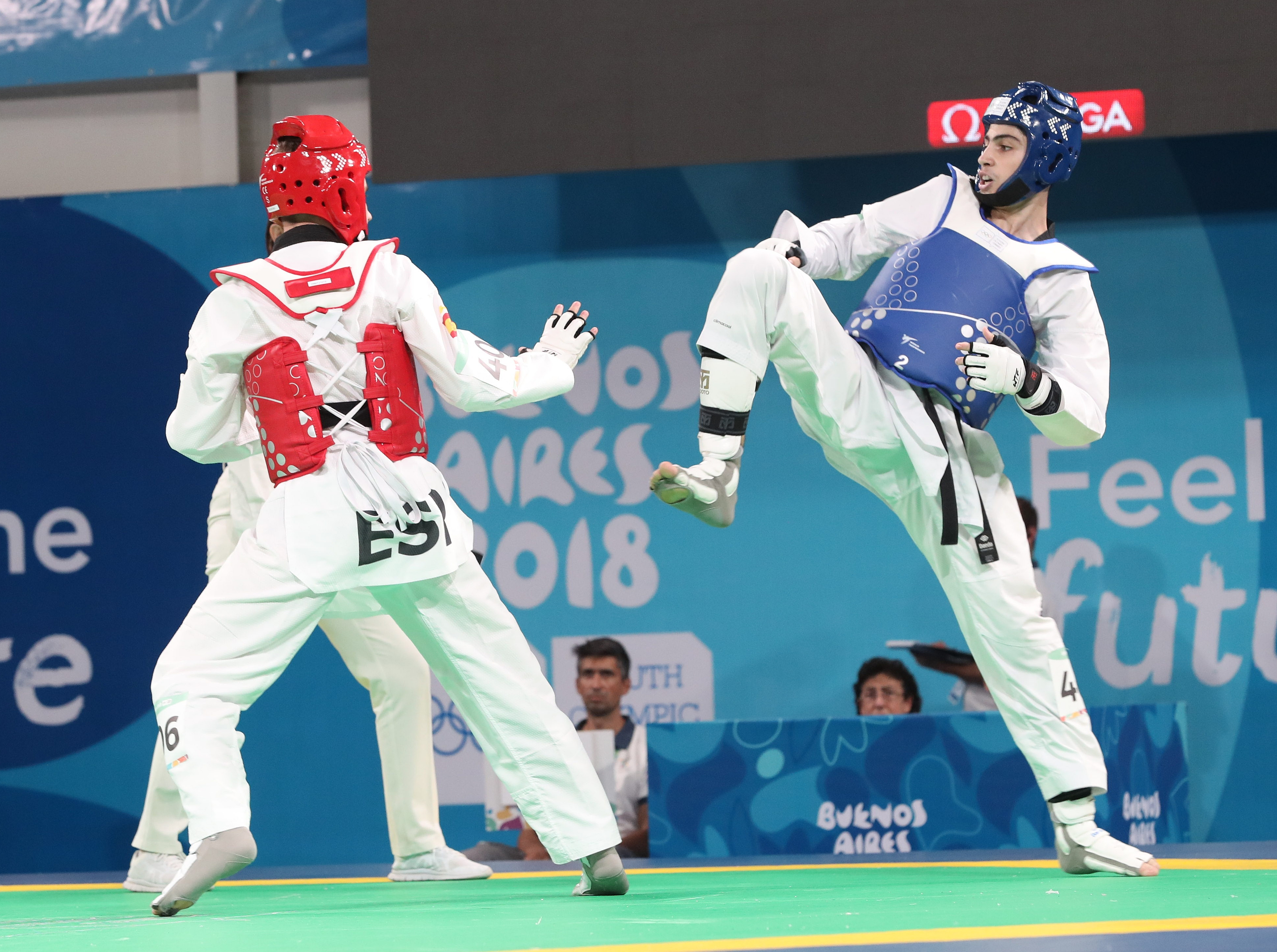
Zaid Mustafa (right) vs. Hugo Arillo
