= Niger at the 2018 Summer Youth Olympics =

- IOC code: NIG
- NOC: Nigerien Olympic and National Sports Committee

in Buenos Aires, Argentina 6 – 18 October 2018
- Competitors: 3 in 3 sports
- Medals Ranked 83rd: Gold 0 Silver 0 Bronze 1 Total 1

Summer Youth Olympics appearances
- 2010; 2014; 2018

Niger participated at the 2018 Summer Youth Olympics in Buenos Aires, Argentina from 6 October to 18 October 2018.

== Medalists ==
| Medal | Name | Sport | Event | Date |
|---|---|---|---|---|
| Bronze | Mahamadou Amadou | Taekwondo | Boys' 55 kg | 8th |

== Athletics ==
| Athlete | Event | Stage 1 | | Stage 2 | | Total | |
| Athlete | Event | Time | Rank | Time | Rank | Time | Rank |
|---|---|---|---|---|---|---|---|
| Abdoulaye Ramatou | Girls' 3000 metres | 11:33.17 | 21 | DNS | 21 | | DNF |

== Swimming ==
| Athlete | Event | Heat | | Semifinal | | Final | |
| Athlete | Event | Time | Rank | Time | Rank | Time | Rank |
|---|---|---|---|---|---|---|---|
| Ahmadou Salima | 50 m breaststroke | 1:00.64 | 43 | Did not advance | | Did not advance | |

== Taekwondo ==
| Athlete | Event | Round of 16 | Quarterfinals | Semifinals | Final | |
| Athlete | Event | Opposition Result | Opposition Result | Opposition Result | Opposition Result | Rank |
|---|---|---|---|---|---|---|
| Mahamadou Amadou | Boys' 55 kg | Bulat (SRB) W 19–7 | Acuña (ARG) W 10–7 | Popov (RUS) L 14–10 | Did not advance | 3rd place, bronze medalist(s) |
