= Taekwondo at the 2023 Pan American Games =

- Taekwondo pictogram
- Venue: Contact Sports Center
- Start date: October 21, 2023
- End date: October 24, 2023
- No. of events: 11 (5 men, 5 women, 1 mixed)
- Competitors: 136 from 26 nations

Taekwondo competitions at the 2023 Pan American Games in Santiago, Chile are scheduled to be held between October 21 and 24, 2023 at the Contact Sports Center, located in Santiago.

13 medal events are scheduled to be contested. Ten of these events are in Kyorugi (five per gender). In March 2023, PanamSports added a men's and women's team events to the sports program in the Kyorugi division. A total of 136 athletes are scheduled to compete.

== Qualification ==
A total of up to 136 taekwondo athletes will qualify to compete. Each nation may enter a maximum of 10 athletes (eight in Kyorugi and two in Poomsae). The host nation, Chile, automatically qualifies the maximum number of athletes (8) and is entered in each event. There will also eight wild card spots awarded in Kyorugi and two in Poomsae. The spots will be awarded at the qualification tournament held in Rio de Janeiro in March 2023.

== Participating nations ==
A total of 26 countries qualified athletes. The number of athletes a nation entered is in parentheses beside the name of the country.

- Argentina (7)
- Barbados (1)
- Bolivia (2)
- Brazil (8)
- Canada (9)
- Chile (8)
- Colombia (7)
- Costa Rica (3)
- Cuba (8)
- Dominican Republic (6)
- Ecuador (8)
- El Salvador (1)
- Guyana (1)
- Haiti (2)
- Honduras (2)
- Independent Athletes Team (4)
- Jamaica (1)
- Mexico (12)
- Nicaragua (3)
- Panama (1)
- Peru (6)
- Puerto Rico (8)
- Suriname (1)
- United States (12)
- Uruguay (2)
- Venezuela (7)

== Medal summary ==
=== Medal table ===
* Host nation (Chile)

Rank	Nation	Gold	Silver	Bronze	Total
1	Mexico	6	1	3	10
2	United States	4	1	3	8
3	Brazil	1	1	3	5
4	Dominican Republic	1	1	0	2
5	Canada	1	0	2	3
6	Colombia	0	3	1	4
7	Nicaragua	0	2	0	2
8	Argentina	0	1	3	4
9	Chile*	0	1	1	2
9	Haiti	0	1	1	2
11	Independent Athletes Team	0	1	0	1
12	Puerto Rico	0	0	3	3
13	Cuba	0	0	2	2
13	Ecuador	0	0	2	2
15	Panama	0	0	1	1
15	Peru	0	0	1	1
Totals (16 entries)		13	13	26	52

=== Kyorugi ===
Men

Event	Gold	Silver	Bronze
58 kg	Brandon Plaza; Mexico	Lucas Guzmán; Argentina	Jhon Garrido; Colombia
58 kg	Brandon Plaza; Mexico	Lucas Guzmán; Argentina	Paulo Ricardo Melo; Brazil
68 kg	Khalfani Harris; United States	Bernardo Pié; Dominican Republic	Tae-Ku Park; Canada
68 kg	Khalfani Harris; United States	Bernardo Pié; Dominican Republic	José Luis Acuña; Argentina
80 kg	Carl Nickolas; United States	Miguel Trejos; Colombia	Kelvin Calderón; Cuba
80 kg	Carl Nickolas; United States	Miguel Trejos; Colombia	Lucas Ostapiv; Brazil
+80 kg	Carlos Sansores; Mexico	Jonathan Healy; United States	Agustín Alves; Argentina
+80 kg	Carlos Sansores; Mexico	Jonathan Healy; United States	Marc-André Bergeron; Canada
Team	Brazil; Edival Pontes; Maicon Andrade; Paulo Ricardo Melo	Chile; Joaquín Churchill; Ignacio Morales; Aarón Contreras	Mexico; Uriel Gómez; Carlos Navarro; Bryan Salazar
Team	Brazil; Edival Pontes; Maicon Andrade; Paulo Ricardo Melo	Chile; Joaquín Churchill; Ignacio Morales; Aarón Contreras	Ecuador; Adrián Miranda; José Carlos Nieto; Julio César Arroyo

Women

Event	Gold	Silver	Bronze
49 kg	Daniela Souza; Mexico	Andrea Ramírez; Colombia	Giulia Sendra; Argentina
49 kg	Daniela Souza; Mexico	Andrea Ramírez; Colombia	Melina Daniel; United States
57 kg	Skylar Park; Canada	Maria Clara Pacheco; Brazil	Caitlyn Cox; United States
57 kg	Skylar Park; Canada	Maria Clara Pacheco; Brazil	Carolena Carstens; Panama
67 kg	Leslie Soltero; Mexico	Ava Soon Lee; Haiti	Claudia Gallardo; Chile
67 kg	Leslie Soltero; Mexico	Ava Soon Lee; Haiti	Kristina Teachout; United States
+67 kg	Madelynn Gorman-Shore; United States	Gloria Mosquera; Colombia	Aliyah Shipman; Haiti
+67 kg	Madelynn Gorman-Shore; United States	Gloria Mosquera; Colombia	Victoria Heredia; Mexico
Team	Dominican Republic; Katherine Rodríguez; Madelyn Rodríguez; Mayerlin Mejía	Mexico; Victoria Heredia; Fabiola Villegas; Leslie Soltero	Brazil; Caroline Santos; Maria Clara Pacheco; Sandy Macedo
Team	Dominican Republic; Katherine Rodríguez; Madelyn Rodríguez; Mayerlin Mejía	Mexico; Victoria Heredia; Fabiola Villegas; Leslie Soltero	Cuba; Arlettys Acosta; Frislaidis Martínez; Marlyn Pérez

=== Poomsae ===
Event	Gold	Silver	Bronze
Men's individual	William Arroyo; Mexico	Elian Ortega; Nicaragua	Luis Colón; Puerto Rico
Men's individual	William Arroyo; Mexico	Elian Ortega; Nicaragua	Hugo del Castillo; Peru
Women's individual	Kaitlyn Reclusado; United States	María Higueros; Independent Athletes Team	Soo Lee Kim; Mexico
Women's individual	Kaitlyn Reclusado; United States	María Higueros; Independent Athletes Team	Arelis Medina; Puerto Rico
Mixed pairs	Mexico; William Arroyo; Soo Lee Kim	Nicaragua; Elian Ortega; Ingrid Darce	Puerto Rico; Luis Colón; Arelis Medina
Mixed pairs	Mexico; William Arroyo; Soo Lee Kim	Nicaragua; Elian Ortega; Ingrid Darce	Ecuador; Mario Troya; Katlen Jerves

== See also ==
- Taekwondo at the 2023 Parapan American Games
- Taekwondo at the 2024 Summer Olympics
