= 2016 European Taekwondo Championships =

Taekwondo competition

- Venue: Salle Omnisports du Pierrier
- Location: Montreux, Switzerland
- Start date: 18 May 2016
- End date: 22 May 2016
- Nations: 46

The 2016 European Taekwondo Championships was the 22nd edition of the European Taekwondo Championships, and was held in Montreux, Switzerland, from May 19 to May 22, 2016.

== Medal table ==
* Host nation (Switzerland)

Rank	Nation	Gold	Silver	Bronze	Total
1	Great Britain	3	0	1	4
2	Turkey	2	3	2	7
3	Russia	2	1	6	9
4	Belgium	2	0	2	4
5	Portugal	2	0	0	2
6	Croatia	1	1	3	5
7	Azerbaijan	1	1	1	3
7	Serbia	1	1	1	3
9	Belarus	1	0	0	1
9	Ukraine	1	0	0	1
11	Spain	0	2	2	4
12	France	0	1	5	6
13	Poland	0	1	2	3
14	Armenia	0	1	1	2
14	Germany	0	1	1	2
16	Israel	0	1	0	1
16	Slovenia	0	1	0	1
16	Sweden	0	1	0	1
19	Italy	0	0	2	2
20	Moldova	0	0	1	1
20	Netherlands	0	0	1	1
20	North Macedonia	0	0	1	1
Totals (22 entries)		16	16	32	64

== Medal summary ==
=== Men ===
Event	Gold	Silver	Bronze
−54 kg	Mourad Laachraoui; Belgium	Jesus Tortosa Cabrera; Spain	Stanislav Denisov; Russia
−54 kg	Mourad Laachraoui; Belgium	Jesus Tortosa Cabrera; Spain	Mikhail Artamonov; Russia
−58 kg	Rui Braganca; Portugal	Ron Atias; Israel	Feyi Pearce; Great Britain
−58 kg	Rui Braganca; Portugal	Ron Atias; Israel	Ruslan Poiseev; Russia
−63 kg	Jaouad Achab; Belgium	Jarosław Mecmajer; Poland	Stevens Barclais; France
−63 kg	Jaouad Achab; Belgium	Jarosław Mecmajer; Poland	Joel Gonzalez Bonilla; Spain
−68 kg	Servet Tazegül; Turkey	Hamza Adnan-Karim; Germany	Sergey Vardazaryan; Armenia
−68 kg	Servet Tazegül; Turkey	Hamza Adnan-Karim; Germany	Konstantin Minin; Russia
−74 kg	Júlio Ferreira; Portugal	Toni Kanaet; Croatia	Clauido Treviso; Italy
−74 kg	Júlio Ferreira; Portugal	Toni Kanaet; Croatia	Nicholas Corten; Belgium
−80 kg	Milad Beigi; Azerbaijan	Yunus Sarı; Turkey	Aaron Cook; Moldova
−80 kg	Milad Beigi; Azerbaijan	Yunus Sarı; Turkey	Piotr Paziński; Poland
−87 kg	Vladislav Larin; Russia	Arman Yeremyan; Armenia	Payam Ghobadi; Azerbaijan
−87 kg	Vladislav Larin; Russia	Arman Yeremyan; Armenia	Draško Jovanov; Serbia
+87 kg	Arman-Marshall Silla; Belarus	Roman Kuznetsov; Russia	Piotr Hatowski; Poland
+87 kg	Arman-Marshall Silla; Belarus	Roman Kuznetsov; Russia	Omar El Yazidi; France

=== Women ===
Event	Gold	Silver	Bronze
−46 kg	Iryna Romoldanova; Ukraine	Blanca Palmer Soler; Spain	Hajer Mustapha; France
−46 kg	Iryna Romoldanova; Ukraine	Blanca Palmer Soler; Spain	Rukiye Yıldırım; Turkey
−49 kg	Tijana Bogdanović; Serbia	Ana Petrušič; Slovenia	Alexandra Lychagina; Russia
−49 kg	Tijana Bogdanović; Serbia	Ana Petrušič; Slovenia	Lucija Zaninović; Croatia
−53 kg	Tatiana Kudashova; Russia	Patimat Abakarova; Azerbaijan	Zeliha Ağrıs; Turkey
−53 kg	Tatiana Kudashova; Russia	Patimat Abakarova; Azerbaijan	Floriane Liborio; France
−57 kg	Jade Jones; Great Britain	Nikita Glasnovic; Sweden	Raheleh Asemani; Belgium
−57 kg	Jade Jones; Great Britain	Nikita Glasnovic; Sweden	Martina Zubčić; Croatia
−62 kg	İrem Yaman; Turkey	Magda Wiet-Hénin; France	Rabia Gülec; Germany
−62 kg	İrem Yaman; Turkey	Magda Wiet-Hénin; France	Daniela Rotolo; Italy
−67 kg	Lauren Williams; Great Britain	Nur Tatar; Turkey	Haby Niaré; France
−67 kg	Lauren Williams; Great Britain	Nur Tatar; Turkey	Matea Jelić; Croatia
−73 kg	Iva Radoš; Croatia	Milica Mandić; Serbia	Reshmie Oogink; Netherlands
−73 kg	Iva Radoš; Croatia	Milica Mandić; Serbia	Petra Matijašević; North Macedonia
+73 kg	Bianca Walkden; Great Britain	Nafia Kuş; Turkey	Olga Ivanova; Russia
+73 kg	Bianca Walkden; Great Britain	Nafia Kuş; Turkey	Rosana Simón Álamo; Spain

== Participating nations ==
- Albania
- Andorra
- Austria
- Azerbaijan
- Belarus
- Belgium
- Bosnia and Herzegovina
- Bulgaria
- Croatia
- Czech Republic
- Cyprus
- Denmark
- Finland
- France
- Georgia
- Germany
- Great Britain
- Greece
- Hungary
- Iceland
- Ireland
- Isle of Man
- Israel
- Italy
- Latvia
- Lithuania
- Ireland
- Moldova
- Monaco
- Montenegro
- Netherlands
- Norway
- Poland
- Portugal
- Romania
- Russia
- San Marino
- Scotland
- Serbia
- Slovakia
- Slovenia
- Spain
- Sweden
- Switzerland
- Turkey
- Ukraine
