= Hsu Chia-lin =

Taiwanese taekwondo practitioner

Medal record

Men's taekwondo

Representing Chinese Taipei

World Championships
Silver medal – second place	2013 Puebla	Finweight

East Asian Games
Gold medal – first place	2009 Hong Kong	Finweight

Asian Games
Bronze medal – third place	2010 Guangzhou	Finweight

Universiade
Silver medal – second place	2011 Shenzhen	Finweight

Hsu Chia-lin (born 29 February 1992) is a Taiwanese taekwondo practitioner. Hsu won the silver medalist at the 2013 World Taekwondo Championships in the men's finweight (under 54 kg) class. He won African Champion Hussein Sherif of Egypt in the semifinals but lost to Kim Tae-Hun of South Korea 7-0 in the final bout.
