= Jerranat Nakaviroj =

Thai taekwondo practitioner

Sport
- Country: Thailand
- Sport: Taekwondo
- Event: Finweight (-54 kg)
- Coached by: Choi Young-Seok
Medal record
Representing Thailand
Men's taekwondo
World Championships
Bronze medal – third place	2013 Puebla	Finweight
Asian Championships
Gold medal – first place	2008 Luoyang	Finweight
Silver medal – second place	2014 Tashkent	Finweight
Southeast Asian Games
Gold medal – first place	2009 Vientiane	Finweight
Silver medal – second place	2011 Jakarta	Flyweight
Universiade
Gold medal – first place	2011 Shenzhen	Finweight

Jerranat Nakaviroj (born January 28, 1990) is a Thai taekwondo practitioner who was the bronze medalist at the 2013 World Taekwondo Championships in the men's finweight (under 54 kg) class.
