= Hussein Sherif =

Egyptian taekwondo practitioner

Medal record

Representing Egypt

Men's taekwondo

World Championships
Bronze medal – third place	2013 Puebla	Finweight

Hussein Sherif is an Egyptian taekwondo practitioner. Sherif won the bronze medal in the men's finweight (under 54 kg) division at the 2013 World Taekwondo Championships in Puebla.
