= Brandon Plaza =

Mexican taekwondo practitioner

Personal information
- Full name: Brandon Plaza Hernandéz
- Born: 22 October 1996 (age 29) Comonfort, Mexico
- Height: 180 cm (5 ft 11 in)

Sport
- Country: Mexico
- Sport: Taekwondo
- Event: –58 kg
- Team: MEX
Medal record
Representing Mexico
World Championships
Silver medal – second place	2019 Manchester	58 kg
Bronze medal – third place	2022 Guadalajara	58 kg
Pan American Games
Gold medal – first place	2023 Santiago	58 kg
Silver medal – second place	2019 Lima	58 kg
Pan American Championships
Gold medal – first place	2018 Spokane	58 kg
World Junior Championships
Bronze medal – third place	2012 Sharm El Sheikh	45 kg
- Updated on 15 May 2019

Brandon Plaza Hernandéz (Note: In this Spanish name, the first or paternal surname is Plaza and the second or maternal family name is Hernandéz.) (born 22 October 1996) is a Mexican taekwondo athlete. He won the gold medal at the 2018 Pan Am Taekwondo Championships.

He won one of the bronze medals in the men's flyweight event at the 2022 World Taekwondo Championships held in Guadalajara, Mexico.
