= Stanislav Denisov =

Russian taekwondo fighter

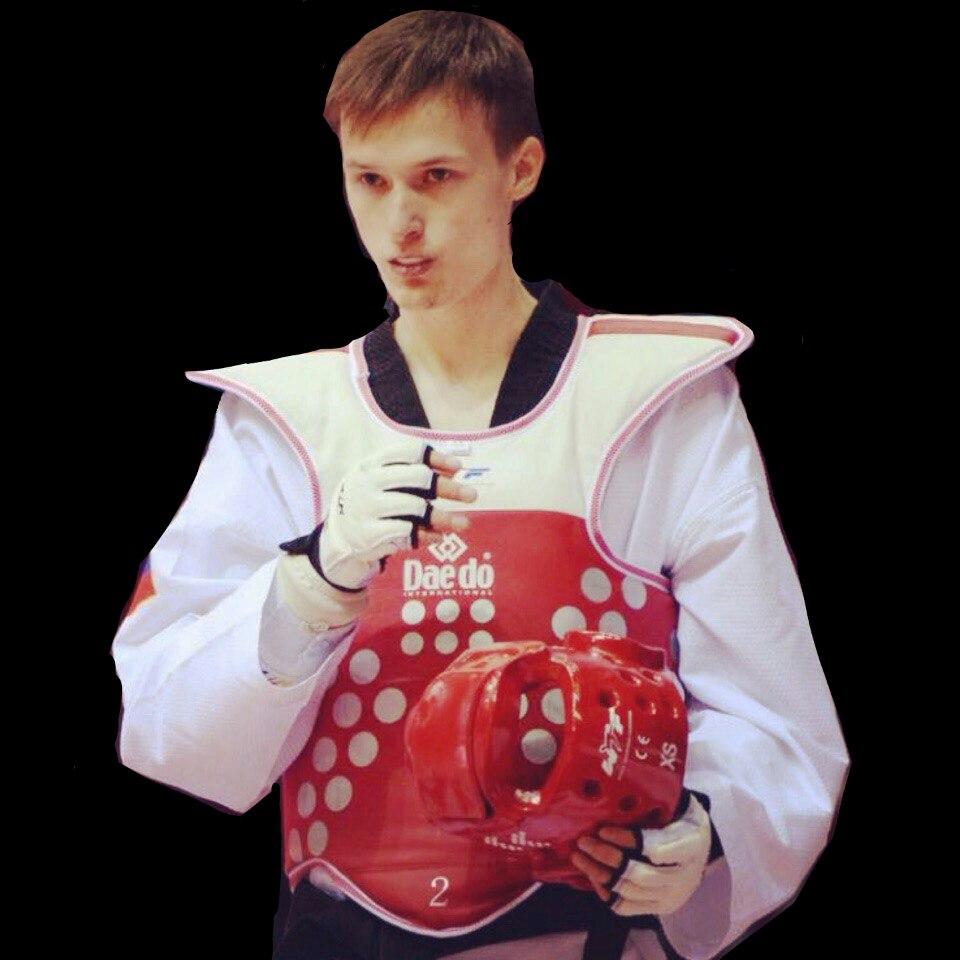
- Denisov in 2015.

Personal information
- Nationality: Russian
- Born: December 23, 1993 (age 32)

Sport
- Sport: Taekwondo
Medal record
Men's taekwondo
Representing Russia
World Championships
Silver medal – second place	2015 Chelyabinsk	Finweight
European Championships
Bronze medal – third place	2016 Montreux	Finweight

Stanislav Denisov (born 23 December 1993) is a Russian taekwondo practitioner. In 2015, he won the silver medal in the men's finweight event at the 2015 World Taekwondo Championships held in Chelyabinsk, Russia.
