= Taekwondo at the 2023 Pan American Games – Men's 58 kg =

Men's 58 kg at the 2023 Pan American Games
- Venue: Contact Sports Center
- Start date: October 21, 2023
- End date: October 21, 2023
- Competitors: 13 from 13 nations

Medalists
Gold medal	Brandon Plaza	Mexico
Silver medal	Lucas Guzmán	Argentina
Bronze medal	Jhon Garrido	Colombia
Bronze medal	Paulo Melo	Brazil

The men's 58 kg competition of the taekwondo events at the 2023 Pan American Games in Santiago, Chile, was held on October 21 at the Contact Sports Center. A total of 13 athletes from 13 NOC's competed.

== Qualification ==
The host nation, Chile, automatically qualified automatically and the quotas spots were awarded at the qualification tournament held in Rio de Janeiro in March 2023. The final quota spots were awarded as wildcards (if applicable).

== Results ==
=== Bracket ===
Round of 16
Cristofer Reyes (DOM)	1
Edrick Morales (PUR)	0
Lucas Guzmán (ARG)	2
Raymiguel Barreto (PER)	0
Jhon Garrido (COL)	2
Aaron Contreras (CHI)	0
Gavin Grant (USA)	0
Yohandri Granado (VEN)	2
David Fuentes (EAI)	0
Adrián Miranda (ECU)	2

Quarterfinals
Paulo Melo (BRA)	2
Cristofer Reyes (DOM)	0
Lucas Guzmán (ARG)	2
Jhon Garrido (COL)	0
Braven Park (CAN)	2
Yohandri Granado (VEN)	0
Adrián Miranda (ECU)	0
Brandon Plaza (MEX)	2

Semifinals
Paulo Melo (BRA)	0
Lucas Guzmán (ARG)	2
Braven Park (CAN)	1
Brandon Plaza (MEX)	2

Gold medal match
Lucas Guzmán (ARG)	1
Brandon Plaza (MEX)	2

=== Repechage ===
Repechage		Bronze medal match
Jhon Garrido (COL)	2
Raymiguel Barreto (PER)	0
Raymiguel Barreto (PER)	0	Jhon Garrido (COL)	2
		Braven Park (CAN)	0

Repechage	Bronze medal match
	Adrián Miranda (ECU)	0
	Paulo Melo (BRA)	2
