= Venilton Teixeira =

Brazilian taekwondo practitioner

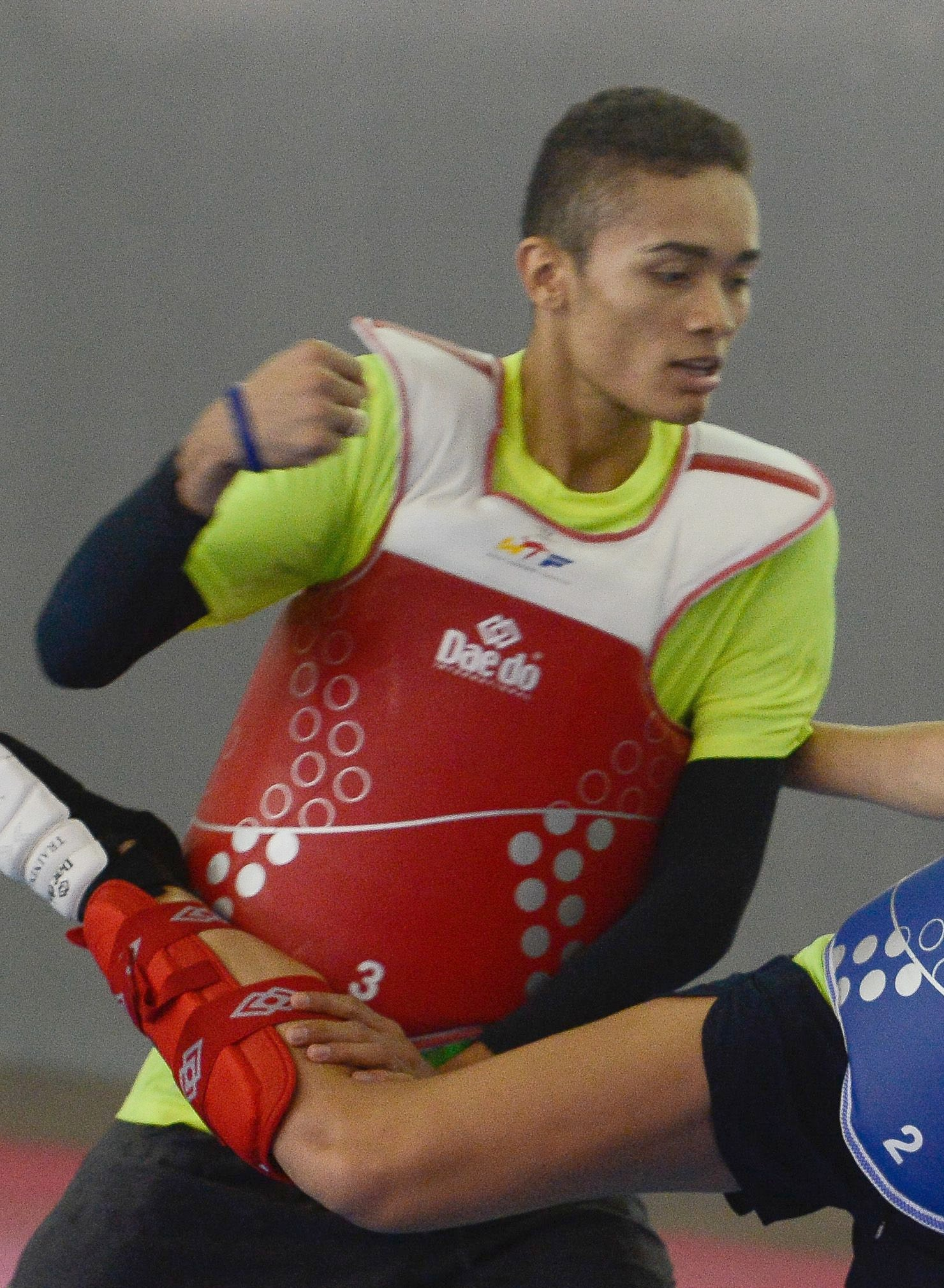
- Venilton Teixeira in 2016

Personal information
- Born: 6 September 1995 (age 30) Laranjal do Jari, Brazil
- Height: 182 cm (6 ft 0 in)
- Weight: 58 kg (128 lb)

Sport
- Sport: Taekwondo
Medal record
Representing Brazil
World Championships
Bronze medal – third place	2015 Chelyabinsk	-54 kg
Military World Games
Gold medal – first place	2015 Mungyeong	-54 kg

Venilton Torres Teixeira (born 6 September 1995, Laranjal do Jari) is a taekwondo competitor from Brazil. He won a bronze medal in the 54 kg division at the 2015 world championships and qualified for the 2016 Summer Olympics in the 58 kg weight category.
