= Taekwondo at the 2019 Pan American Games – Men's 58 kg =

Taekwondo – Men's 58 kg at the 2019 Pan American Games
- Venue: Polideportivo Callao
- Dates: July 27
- Competitors: 13 from 13 nations

Medalists
Gold medal	Lucas Guzmán	Argentina
Silver medal	Brandon Plaza	Mexico
Bronze medal	David Kim	United States
Bronze medal	Paulo Ricardo Melo	Brazil

The men's 58 kg competition of the taekwondo events at the 2019 Pan American Games took place on July 27 at the Polideportivo Callao.

== Results ==
=== Main bracket ===
The final results were:

Preliminary round
Jefferson Ochoa (COL)	24
Jorge Ramos (CHI)	11
Luisito Pié (DOM)	5
Yohandri Granado (VEN)	9
Jerry Mansell (NCA)	8
Luis Oblitas (PER)	19
Jose Diaz (CAN)	9
David Kim (USA)	29
Heiner Oviedo (CRC)	23
Adrian Miranda (ECU)	22

Quarterfinals
Brandon Plaza (MEX)	28
Jefferson Ochoa (COL)	8
Yohandri Granado (VEN)	27
Luis Oblitas (PER)	7
Lucas Guzmán (ARG)	2
David Kim (USA)	0
Heiner Oviedo (CRC)	10
Paulo Ricardo Melo (BRA)	30

Semifinals
Brandon Plaza (MEX)	39
Yohandri Granado (VEN)	28
Lucas Guzmán (ARG)	7
Paulo Ricardo Melo (BRA)	6

Gold medal match
Brandon Plaza (MEX)	17
Lucas Guzmán (ARG)	19

=== Repechage ===
Bronze medal match
Yohandri Granado (VEN)	0
David Kim (USA)	2

Bronze medal match
Jefferson Ochoa (COL)	0
Paulo Ricardo Melo (BRA)	2
