= Paulo Melo =

Brazilian taekwondo practitioner

Personal information
- Full name: Paulo Ricardo Melo
- Nationality: Brazilian
- Born: 1 March 1997 (age 29) Assú, Rio Grande do Norte
- Height: 175 cm (5 ft 9 in)
- Weight: 54 kg (119 lb)

Sport
- Sport: Taekwondo
- Club: Team Taekwondo Escola
- Coached by: Fábio Lourenço
Medal record
Representing Brazil
Men's taekwondo
World Championships
Bronze medal – third place	2019 Manchester	54 kg
Pan American Games
Gold medal – first place	2023 Santiago	Team
Bronze medal – third place	2019 Lima	58 kg
Bronze medal – third place	2023 Santiago	58 kg
Pan American Championships
Gold medal – first place	2022 Punta Cana	54 kg
Silver medal – second place	2018 Spokane	54 kg
Bronze medal – third place	2021 Cancún	54 kg
South American Games
Gold medal – first place	2022 Asunción	58 kg
Bronze medal – third place	2018 Cochabamba	58 kg
Military World Games
Gold medal – first place	2019 Wuhan	54 kg

Paulo Ricardo Souza de Melo (born March 1, 1997) is a Brazilian taekwondo athlete who won a bronze medal at the 2019 World Taekwondo Championships on the men's 54 kg.

== Career ==
Paulo started playing the sport in 2009, in the social project "Projovem", with coach Fabio Lourenço.

At the 2018 South American Games held in Cochabamba, Bolivia, Melo won a bronze medal in the 58 kg category.

At the 2018 Pan American Taekwondo Championships held in Spokane, USA, Melo won a silver medal.

At the 2019 World Taekwondo Championships held in Manchester, United Kingdom, Melo won a bronze medal in the Men's finweight category.

At the 2019 Pan American Games held in Lima, Peru, Melo won a bronze medal in the Men's 58 kg category.

At the 2021 Pan American Taekwondo Championships held in Cancún, Mexico, Melo won a bronze medal in the -54 kg category.

At the 2022 Pan American Taekwondo Championships held in Punta Cana, Dominican Republic, Melo obtained the biggest title of his career by obtaining the gold medal in the 54 kg category.

At the 2022 South American Games held in Asunción, Paraguay, Melo won the gold medal in the 58 kg category.

At the 2022 World Taekwondo Championships held in Guadalajara, Mexico, Melo started with a 2-0 victory over Australian Benjamin Camua, with scores of 15-1 and 16-4. In the round of 16, Melo had another triumph, beating the Chinese Zhou Xiao 2-0 (7-1 and 5-1). The Brazilian ended up losing in detail in the quarterfinals, against the South Korean Bae Jun-seo. The first round was tied at 0-0, when Paulo had a fall while attempting a strike at the last second, giving his opponent a point. In the second, a 5-5 draw, with the Asian winning the tiebreaker to close the duel 2-0 (1-0 and 5*-5). Melo finished in 5th place.

At the 2023 World Taekwondo Championships held in Baku, Azerbaijan, Melo, tenth in the world rankings, debuted against Swede Bleron Ademi and won 2-1 (6/6, 9/1 and 10/3). Then, in the round of 16, he faced Spaniard Hugo Arillo and was defeated in partials of 6/3, 4/6 and 5/4. Melo was ahead on the scoreboard in the last two rounds, but suffered a comeback.

At the 2023 Pan American Games held in Santiago, Chile, Melo repeated his 2019 result, again obtaining bronze in the individual category. The Brazilian men's team, formed by Melo, Maicon Andrade and Edival Pontes, won an unprecedented gold medal for the country, after a thrilling comeback over Cuba in the semifinals, with a 76-60 triumph, and a crushing victory over Chile 48 to 16, where the Brazilian team was impressive in front of the noisy fans who attended the Centro de Deportes de Contacto.
