= Armin Hadipour =

Iranian taekwondo practitioner

Personal information
- Born: 12 August 1994 (age 31)
- Height: 175 cm (5 ft 9 in)
- Weight: 54 kg (119 lb)

Sport
- Sport: Taekwondo
Medal record
Representing Iran
World Championships
Silver medal – second place	2017 Muju	54 kg
Bronze medal – third place	2019 Manchester	54 kg
Asian Championships
Gold medal – first place	2016 Manila	54 kg
Bronze medal – third place	2018 Ho Chi Minh City	54 kg
Bronze medal – third place	2021 Beirut	58 kg
Universiade
Gold medal – first place	2015 Gwangju	54 kg
Gold medal – first place	2017 Taipei	54 kg
Gold medal – first place	2019 Naples	58 kg
- Updated on 17 June 2021

Armin Hadipour Seighalani (Persian: آرمین هادی‌پور صیقلانی; born 12 August 1994) is an Iranian Taekwondo athlete who won a silver medal at the 2017 World Taekwondo Championships. He has qualified to represent Iran at the 2020 Summer Olympics in the Men's 58 kg category.

Hadipour became tops off Student athletes of the 2010s list of FISU for winning 3 consecutive Gold Medals at 2015, 2017 and 2019 Universiade.

== Personal life ==
On 18 January 2026, Shayan Shekari, a taekwondo student whom Hadipour coached, was killed during the 2025-2026 Iranian protests. On 20 January, Hadipour shared Shekari's pictures and training footage on his Instagram, stating: "You slept so you wouldn't feel pain, and we stayed awake to bear the pain. Your name, your path, your zeal...will live on forever".
