= Amir Mohammad Hosseini =

Iranian Taekwondo practitioner

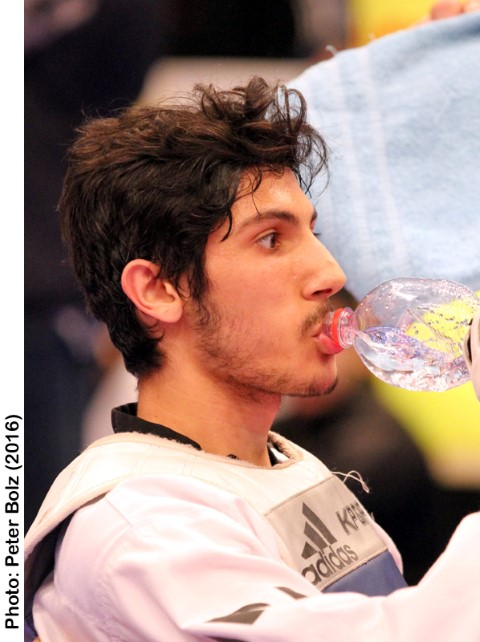
- Born: 7 November 1998 (age 27); Tehran, Iran
- Education: Air Force construction
- Known for: Taekwondo athlete
- Height: 1.75 m (5 ft 9 in)

Amir Mohammad Hosseini (Persian: امیر محمد حسینی, born on 7 November 1998) is an Iranian Taekwondo practitioner who lives in Hamburg, Germany. He is an International Olympic Committee (IOC) refugee athlete scholarship holder for the Tokyo Olympic Games. He participated in World Taekwondo Championships 2019 in Manchester and European Championships 2019 and also in European Taekwondo Championships 2021 as a refugee athlete. He won silver medal at the German Open 2016.

== Career ==
Hosseini was born in Tehran, and began Taekwondo at the age of eight. He left Iran for Germany in 2012 and started to participate at national and international tournaments in Europe the following year. In 2019 he became one of only 50 people in the world to receive a scholarship for the Tokyo Olympics 2020 which was delayed until 2021 by the COVID-19.

== Events ==
Event	G-Rank	Event Date	Location	Place	Ranking Points
Manchester 2019 World Taekwondo Championships	G-12	15-19 May 2019	Manchester, UK	17	12.70
G4 Extra European Championships	G-4	1-3 November 2019	Bari, Italy	17	4.23
1st WTF President's Cup-European Region	G-2	7-10 April 2016	Bonn, Germany	17	0.53
Croatia Open 2019	G-1	9-10 November 2019	Zagreb, Croatia	5	2.16
German Open 2019	G-1	30-31 March 2019	Hamburg, Germany	5	1.62
Dutch Open Taekwondo Championships 2019	G-1	9-10 March 2019	Eindhoven, Netherlands	9	1.13
Greece Open 2018	G-1	19-21 October 2018	Athens, Greece	5	1.62
Polish Open Warsaw Cup 2018	G-1	14-16 September 2018	Warsaw, Poland	9	1.13
Belgian Open 2018 (Kyorugi Divisions)	G-1	16-18 March 2018	Lommel, Belgium	9	0.76
Slovenia Open 2018	G-1	24-25 February 2018	Maribor, Slovenia	9	0.76
Luxembourg Open 2016	G-1	9-10 July 2016	Luxembourg	9	0.38
Austrian Open 2016	G-1	4-5 June 2016	Innsbruck, Austria	5	0.54
GERMAN OPEN 2016	G-1	23-24 April 2016	Hamburg, Germany	2	1.50
