= Hugo Arillo =

Spanish taekwondo practitioner

Personal information
- Nationality: Spanish
- Born: Hugo Arillo Vazquez; 28 February 2002 (age 24) Alicante

Sport
- Sport: Taekwondo
- Weight class: Lightweight
Medal record
Men's taekwondo
Representing Spain
World Championships
Silver medal – second place	2023 Baku	54kg
European Games
Gold medal – first place	2023 Kraków-Małopolska	54kg

Hugo Arillo Vazquez (Note: In this Spanish name, the first or paternal surname is Arillo and the second or maternal family name is Vazquez.) (born 28 February 2002) is a Spanish taekwondo practitioner. He was a silver medalist at the 2023 World Taekwondo Championships.

== Early and personal life ==
Born in Alicante, he grew up in Elche, in the Valencian Community of Spain. He was given the award for Best Male Athlete at the Elche City Council Sports Gala in 2023. By 2023, he was living and training in San Cugat del Vallés in Catalonia.

== Career ==
He had a successful year competing the youth circuit in 2019, combining victory in the Spanish Open with silver medals at the Belgian Open and World Taekwondo Europe Multi European Games with a bronze at the European Championships. However, he could only compete in one event in 2020 due to the coronavirus pandemic.

In 2021, he was able to step up into the senior ranks of taekwondo, winning a bronze medal at the Turkey Open in March 2021.

He won the bronze medal in the President Cup in 2023 in Istanbul.

He was a silver medalist in the finweight at the 2023 World Taekwondo Championships in Baku, defeating Görkem Polat in the semifinals before losing out to South Korean Park Tae-joon in the final.

He won the gold medal at the 2023 European Games in Kraków defeating Sayyad Dadashov of Azerbaijan in the final. He won the bronze medal at the Manchester Grand Prix in December 2023.
