= Görkem Polat =

Turkish taekwondo practitioner

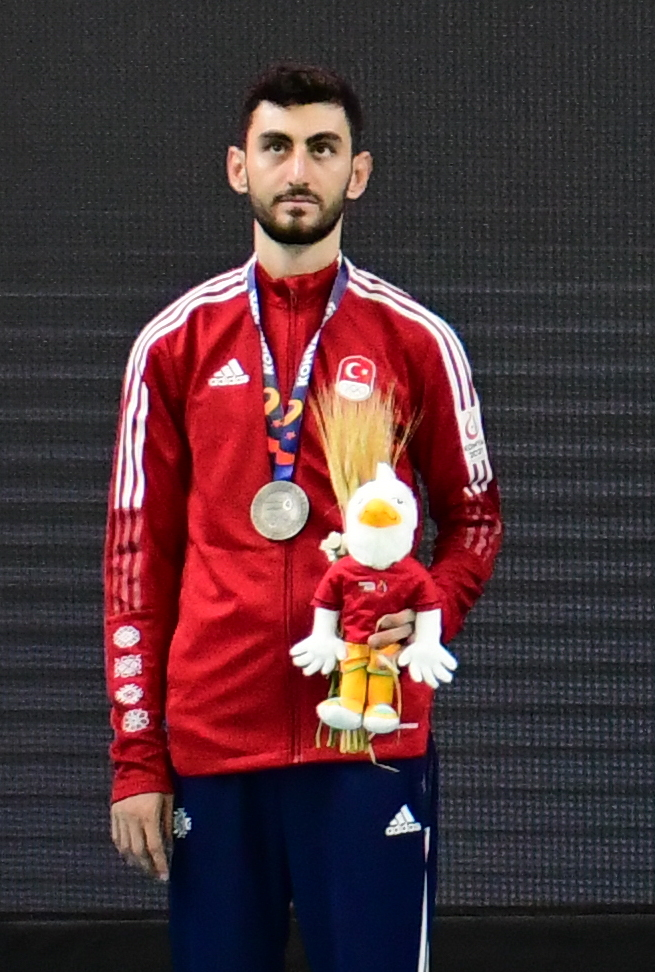

Personal information
- Born: February 18, 2001 (age 25) Turkey
- Weight: 54 kg (119 lb)

Sport
- Country: Turkey
- Sport: Taekwondo
- Event: 54-58 kg
Medal record
Representing Turkey
Men's taekwondo
World Championships
Bronze medal – third place	2023 Baku	54 kg
European Championships
Silver medal – second place	2022 Manchester	54 kg
Grand Prix
Bronze medal – third place	2022 Rome	58 kg
Islamic Solidarity Games
Silver medal – second place	2022 Konya	58 kg
World Junior Championships
Silver medal – second place	2018 Hammamet	48 kg
European Junior Championships
Bronze medal – third place	2017 Larnaca	48 kg

Görkem Polat is a Turkish taekwondo athlete.

== Career ==
In 2022, Görkem Polat won the silver medals in 54 kg at the 2022 European Taekwondo Championships held in Manchester, England. He clinched one of bronze medal at the 2022 World Taekwondo Grand Prix in Rome during the men's 58 kg event.

Görkem Polat won 56 kg in the first round against Anas Aldabba from Palestine, Po-yen Chen from Taiwan in the second round and Cesar Rodriguez from Mexico in the third round at the 2023 World Taekwondo Championships in Baku, Azerbaijan. He reached the semifinals after the disqualification of Riad Hamdi of Saudi Arabia in the quarterfinals. He lost to Hugo Arillo Vazquez of Spain in the semifinals and finished the championship with a bronze medal.
