= 2013 World Taekwondo Championships =

Taekwondo competition

- Venue: Exhibition Center of Puebla
- Location: Puebla, Mexico
- Dates: 15–21 July 2013
- Competitors: 812 from 130 nations

Champions
- Men: South Korea
- Women: South Korea

The 2013 World Taekwondo Championships was the 21st edition of the World Taekwondo Championships, and was held in Puebla, Mexico from 15 to 21 July 2013.

== Medal table ==
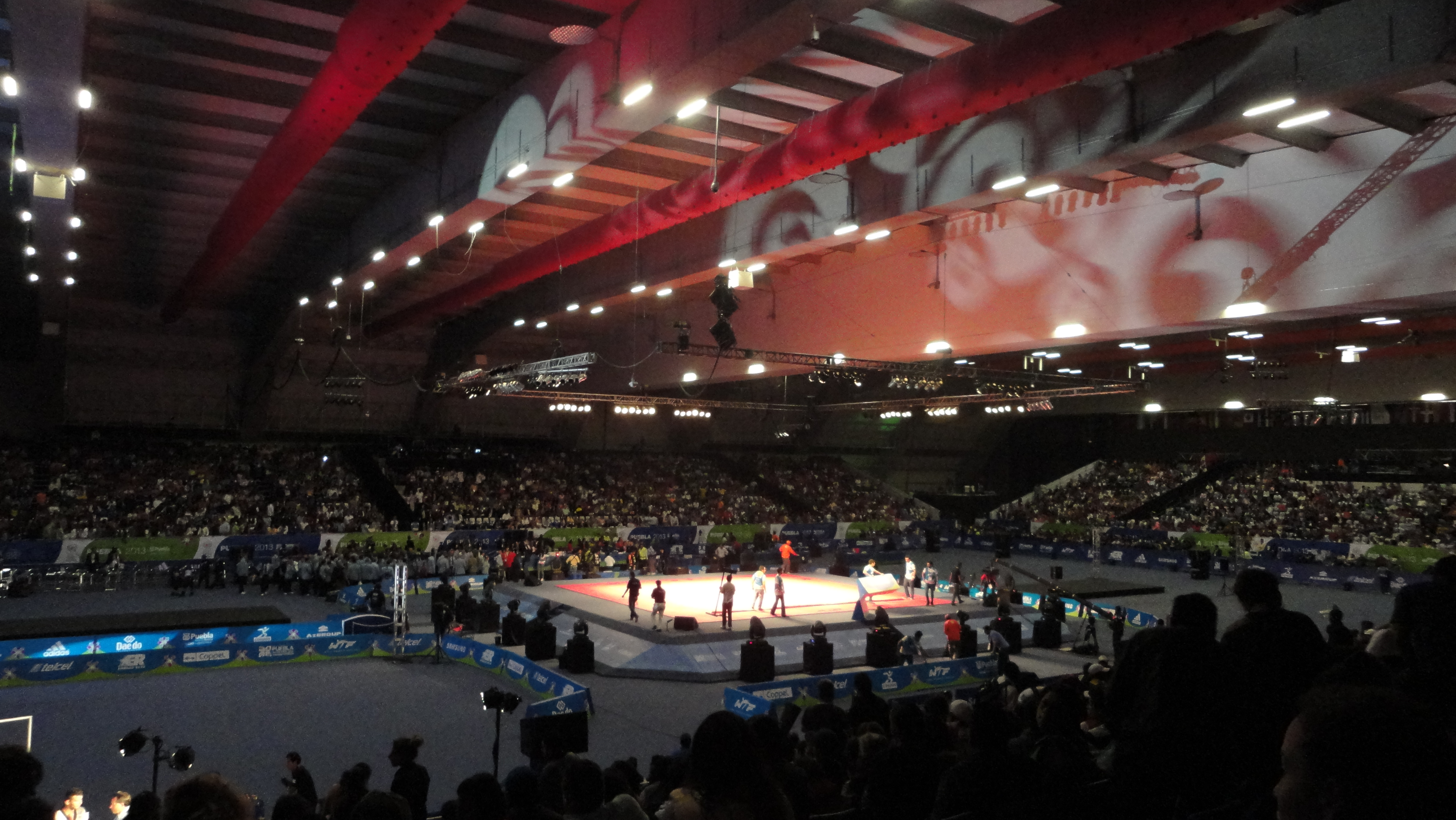
The indoor arena at the final

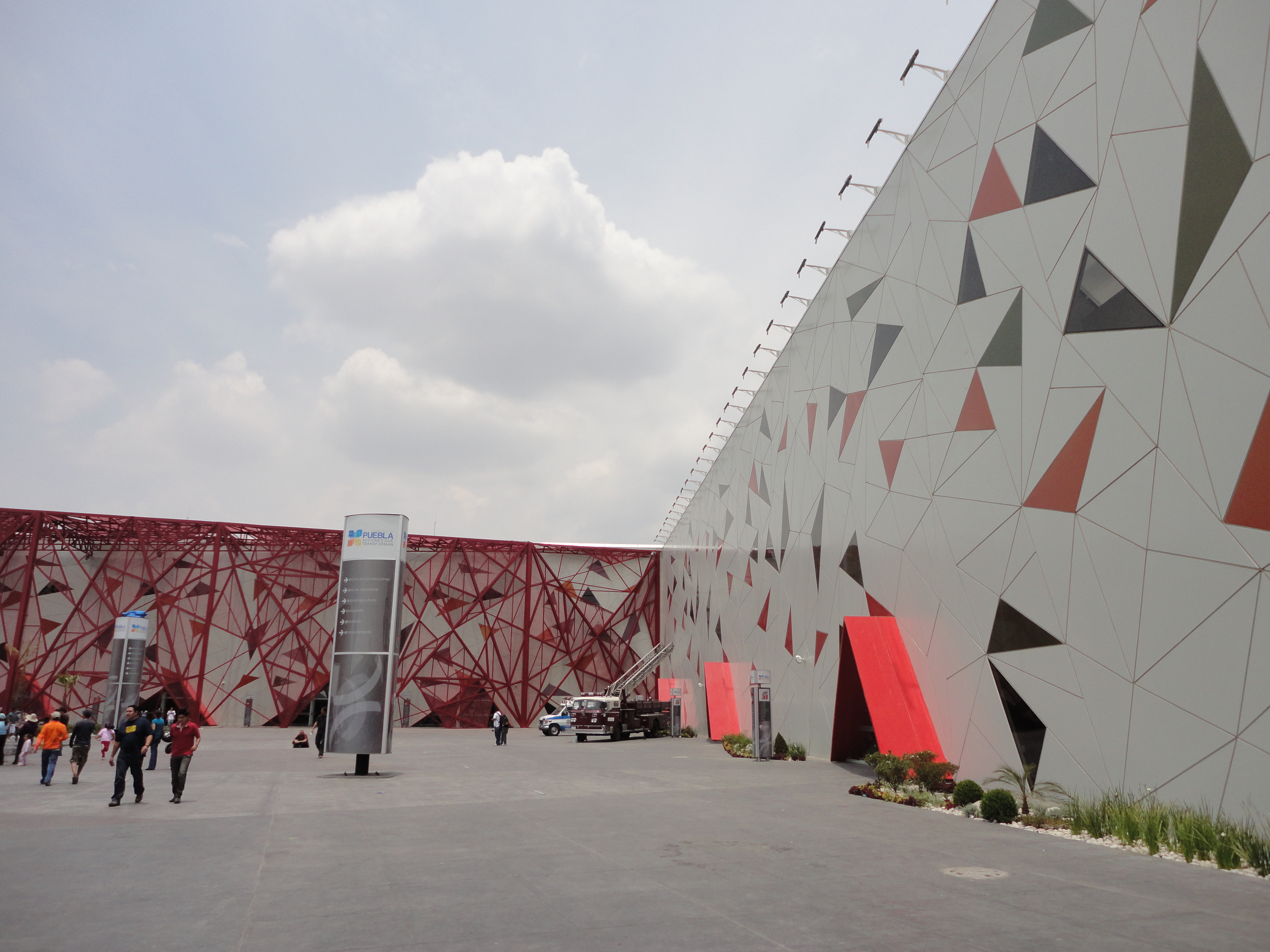
Main entry of the Puebla Exhibition Centre

Rank	Nation	Gold	Silver	Bronze	Total
1	South Korea	6	3	1	10
2	Cuba	2	0	3	5
3	Mexico	1	3	1	5
4	Russia	1	2	1	4
5	Iran	1	2	0	3
6	France	1	0	3	4
7	Germany	1	0	2	3
8	Thailand	1	0	1	2
9	Australia	1	0	0	1
9	Gabon	1	0	0	1
11	Chinese Taipei	0	2	1	3
12	China	0	1	1	2
12	Croatia	0	1	1	2
14	Japan	0	1	0	1
14	Jordan	0	1	0	1
16	Spain	0	0	3	3
16	Tunisia	0	0	3	3
18	Azerbaijan	0	0	2	2
18	Slovenia	0	0	2	2
20	Brazil	0	0	1	1
20	Canada	0	0	1	1
20	Egypt	0	0	1	1
20	Senegal	0	0	1	1
20	Serbia	0	0	1	1
20	Sweden	0	0	1	1
20	Switzerland	0	0	1	1
Totals (26 entries)		16	16	32	64

== Medal summary ==
=== Men ===
Event	Gold	Silver	Bronze
Finweight (−54 kg)	Kim Tae-hun; South Korea	Hsu Chia-lin; Chinese Taipei	Jerranat Nakaviroj; Thailand
Finweight (−54 kg)	Kim Tae-hun; South Korea	Hsu Chia-lin; Chinese Taipei	Hussein Sherif; Egypt
Flyweight (−58 kg)	Cha Tae-moon; South Korea	Hadi Mostaan; Iran	Damián Villa; Mexico
Flyweight (−58 kg)	Cha Tae-moon; South Korea	Hadi Mostaan; Iran	Guilherme Dias; Brazil
Bantamweight (−63 kg)	Lee Dae-hoon; South Korea	Abel Mendoza; Mexico	Wei Chen-yang; Chinese Taipei
Bantamweight (−63 kg)	Lee Dae-hoon; South Korea	Abel Mendoza; Mexico	Stevens Barclais; France
Featherweight (−68 kg)	Behnam Asbaghi; Iran	Kim Hun; South Korea	Balla Dièye; Senegal
Featherweight (−68 kg)	Behnam Asbaghi; Iran	Kim Hun; South Korea	José Antonio Rosillo; Spain
Lightweight (−74 kg)	Uriel Adriano; Mexico	Albert Gaun; Russia	Kim Yoo-jin; South Korea
Lightweight (−74 kg)	Uriel Adriano; Mexico	Albert Gaun; Russia	Saifeddine Trabelsi; Tunisia
Welterweight (−80 kg)	Tahir Güleç; Germany	René Lizárraga; Mexico	Anton Kotkov; Russia
Welterweight (−80 kg)	Tahir Güleç; Germany	René Lizárraga; Mexico	Nicolás García; Spain
Middleweight (−87 kg)	Rafael Alba; Cuba	Ma Zhaoyong; China	Yassine Trabelsi; Tunisia
Middleweight (−87 kg)	Rafael Alba; Cuba	Ma Zhaoyong; China	Radik Isayev; Azerbaijan
Heavyweight (+87 kg)	Anthony Obame; Gabon	Sajjad Mardani; Iran	Ivan Trajkovič; Slovenia
Heavyweight (+87 kg)	Anthony Obame; Gabon	Sajjad Mardani; Iran	Robelis Despaigne; Cuba

=== Women ===
Event	Gold	Silver	Bronze
Finweight (−46 kg)	Kim So-hui; South Korea	Anastasia Valueva; Russia	Ren Dandan; China
Finweight (−46 kg)	Kim So-hui; South Korea	Anastasia Valueva; Russia	Fadia Farhani; Tunisia
Flyweight (−49 kg)	Chanatip Sonkham; Thailand	Dana Haidar; Jordan	Lucija Zaninović; Croatia
Flyweight (−49 kg)	Chanatip Sonkham; Thailand	Dana Haidar; Jordan	Yania Aguirre; Cuba
Bantamweight (−53 kg)	Kim Yu-jin; South Korea	Ana Zaninović; Croatia	Yamisel Núñez; Cuba
Bantamweight (−53 kg)	Kim Yu-jin; South Korea	Ana Zaninović; Croatia	Floriane Liborio; France
Featherweight (−57 kg)	Kim So-hee; South Korea	Mayu Hamada; Japan	Anna-Lena Frömming; Germany
Featherweight (−57 kg)	Kim So-hee; South Korea	Mayu Hamada; Japan	Eva Calvo; Spain
Lightweight (−62 kg)	Carmen Marton; Australia	Kim Hwi-lang; South Korea	Rabia Gülec; Germany
Lightweight (−62 kg)	Carmen Marton; Australia	Kim Hwi-lang; South Korea	Nina Kläy; Switzerland
Welterweight (−67 kg)	Haby Niaré; France	Chuang Chia-chia; Chinese Taipei	Farida Azizova; Azerbaijan
Welterweight (−67 kg)	Haby Niaré; France	Chuang Chia-chia; Chinese Taipei	Franka Anić; Slovenia
Middleweight (−73 kg)	Glenhis Hernández; Cuba	Lee In-jong; South Korea	Jasmine Vokey; Canada
Middleweight (−73 kg)	Glenhis Hernández; Cuba	Lee In-jong; South Korea	Casandra Ikonen; Sweden
Heavyweight (+73 kg)	Olga Ivanova; Russia	Briseida Acosta; Mexico	Anne-Caroline Graffe; France
Heavyweight (+73 kg)	Olga Ivanova; Russia	Briseida Acosta; Mexico	Ana Bajić; Serbia

== Team ranking ==
=== Men ===
Rank	Team	Points
1	South Korea	60
2	Iran	48
3	Mexico	47
4	Russia	31
5	China	30
6	Chinese Taipei	26
7	Germany	24
8	Cuba	23
9	Spain	22
10	Azerbaijan	22

=== Women ===
Rank	Team	Points
1	South Korea	61
2	Russia	32
3	France	29
4	Cuba	27
5	Australia	22
6	Croatia	22
7	Spain	22
8	China	21
9	Mexico	20
10	Canada	20

== Participating nations ==
A total of 812 athletes from 130 nations competed.

- Albania (2)
- Algeria (4)
- Andorra (1)
- Angola (4)
- Argentina (10)
- Armenia (5)
- Aruba (2)
- Australia (13)
- Austria (3)
- Azerbaijan (15)
- Belarus (8)
- Belgium (4)
- Benin (1)
- Bhutan (2)
- Bolivia (2)
- Brazil (16)
- Bulgaria (3)
- Burkina Faso (1)
- Cameroon (2)
- Canada (16)
- Cape Verde (2)
- Central African Republic (2)
- Chad (5)
- Chile (9)
- China (16)
- Chinese Taipei (16)
- Colombia (16)
- Congo DR (7)
- Costa Rica (10)
- Croatia (10)
- Cuba (8)
- Cyprus (11)
- Czech Republic (1)
- Denmark (1)
- Dominican Republic (10)
- Ecuador (2)
- Egypt (10)
- El Salvador (3)
- Finland (2)
- France (14)
- French Polynesia (6)
- Gabon (13)
- Gambia (2)
- Georgia (2)
- Germany (13)
- Ghana (5)
- Great Britain (8)
- Greece (16)
- Guadeloupe (2)
- Guatemala (3)
- Guyana (1)
- Honduras (8)
- Hungary (3)
- Iceland (1)
- Indonesia (5)
- Iran (12)
- Iraq (1)
- Ireland (1)
- Isle of Man (1)
- Israel (7)
- Italy (13)
- Ivory Coast (15)
- Jamaica (5)
- Japan (5)
- Jordan (9)
- Kazakhstan (14)
- Kenya (4)
- Kuwait (7)
- Kyrgyzstan (3)
- Latvia (1)
- Lebanon (4)
- Lithuania (1)
- Macau (8)
- Malaysia (4)
- Mali (4)
- Martinique (2)
- Mexico (16)
- Moldova (3)
- Mongolia (6)
- Montenegro (2)
- Morocco (2)
- Nepal (3)
- Netherlands (6)
- New Caledonia (1)
- New Zealand (7)
- Niger (2)
- Nigeria (6)
- Norway (4)
- Panama (4)
- Papua New Guinea (2)
- Paraguay (2)
- Peru (5)
- Philippines (13)
- Poland (6)
- Portugal (3)
- Puerto Rico (9)
- Qatar (5)
- Russia (16)
- Rwanda (7)
- Saudi Arabia (4)
- Senegal (4)
- Serbia (13)
- Singapore (3)
- Slovakia (2)
- Slovenia (5)
- Somalia (2)
- South Africa (3)
- South Korea (16)
- Spain (16)
- Suriname (2)
- Swaziland (4)
- Sweden (4)
- Switzerland (3)
- Tajikistan (3)
- Thailand (9)
- Tonga (2)
- Trinidad and Tobago (6)
- Tunisia (7)
- Turkey (16)
- U. S. Virgin Islands (2)
- Uganda (3)
- Ukraine (10)
- United Arab Emirates (1)
- United States (16)
- Uruguay (2)
- Uzbekistan (7)
- Vanuatu (2)
- Venezuela (15)
- Vietnam (10)
- World Taekwondo Federation (12)
- ^{a} Athletes from India competed as World Taekwondo Federation (WTF) due to the suspension of the country's Olympic Committee
