= Ehsan Naghibzadeh =

Iranian Taekwondo participant

Seyedehsan Naghibzadeh
Personal information
- Native name: احسان نقيب زاده
- Born: 15 March 1990 (age 36) Kermanshah, Iran
- Occupation: Taekwondo practitioner
- Height: 1.78 m (5 ft 10 in)
- Weight: 63 kg (139 lb)

Sport
- Sport: Taekwondo
- Event: Bantamweight ( –63 kg)
Medal record
Representing International Olympic Committee
Men's taekwondo
World Championships
Silver medal – second place	2013 Puebla	Team
Universiade
Silver medal – second place	2010 Vigo	-54 kg
European Universities Taekwondo Championships
Bronze medal – third place	2019 Zagreb	-63 kg
West Asian Championships
Gold medal – first place	2010 Schardscha	-54 kg
Asian Club Championships
Silver medal – second place	2011 Tabriz	-54 kg
Open Tournaments
Bronze medal – third place	2019 Lebanon Open	-63 kg
Silver medal – second place	2013 Spain Open	-58 kg
Gold medal – first place	2012 Iranian Open	-58 kg
National Championships
Gold medal – first place	2010 Iran	-54 kg
Gold medal – first place	2009 Iran	-54 kg
Gold medal – first place	2008 Iran	-54 kg
Gold medal – first place	2007 Iran	-54 kg
Gold medal – first place	2006 Iran	-54 kg

Seyedehsan Naghibzadeh (Persian: احسان نقيب زاده, also known as: Ehsan Naghibzadeh, born March 15, 1990, in Kermanshah, Iran) is a male Iranian Taekwondo practitioner, who lives in Switzerland. He is a former member of the Iranian Taekwondo National Team and a 4th DAN in Taekwondo. Since 2019, he is an International Olympic Committee (IOC) refugee athlete scholarship holder for Tokyo Olympic Games. Since 2019, Naghibzadeh is competing as a refugee athlete. He also participated in the European Taekwondo Championships 2019 in Bari. Also in 2019, Naghibzadeh was part of the Booyoung Dream Program, which was held in South Korea. In 2021, he participated in the European Taekwondo Championships in Sofia. Naghibzadeh has won medals in several international olympic ranking tournaments

== Early life ==
Naghibzadeh grew up in Kermanshah, Iran. He started with Taekwondo at the age of seven and became a professional Taekwondo athlete in Iran. He was part of the Iranian Nationalteam, one of the strongest teams in the world, for eight years.

== Medals ==
- 2019 Lebanon Open: bronze
- 2019 University European Championships: bronze
- 2013 Spain Open: silver
- 2013 Taekwondo World Championships - Team 2nd place
- 2012 Iran Open: gold
- 2011 Asian Club Championships: silver
- 2010 World University Championships: silver
- 2010 West Asian Championships: gold
- 2010 Iran Championships: 3x gold (senior, university, U21/قهرمانى جوانان كشور)
- 2009 Iran Championships: gold
- 2008 Iran Championships: gold
- Iranian Olympiad: gold
- 2007 Iran Championships: 3x gold (senior, U21/قهرمانى جوانان كشور)
- 2007 Iran Championships: bronze
- 2006 Iran Championships: gold
- 2004 Iran Championships: 2x silver
