= Lucas Guzmán =

Argentinian taekwondo practitioner

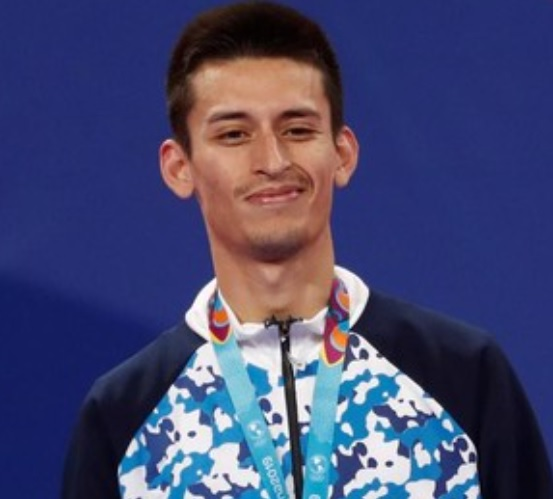

Personal information
- Born: 17 July 1994 (age 31) Merlo, Argentina
- Weight: 63 kg (139 lb)

Sport
- Sport: Taekwondo
- University team: National University of Lomas de Zamora
Medal record
Representing Argentina
Men's taekwondo
World Championships
Bronze medal – third place	2019 Manchester	58 kg
Grand Prix
Bronze medal – third place	2014 Suzhou	58 kg
Bronze medal – third place	2014 Astana	58 kg
Bronze medal – third place	2015 Samsun	58 kg
Pan American Games
Gold medal – first place	2019 Lima	58 kg
Silver medal – second place	2023 Santiago	58 kg
Bronze medal – third place	2015 Toronto	58 kg
Pan American Championships
Silver medal – second place	2014 Aguascalientes	58 kg
Silver medal – second place	2016 Queretaro	63 kg
Bronze medal – third place	2018 Spokane	63 kg
Universiade
Silver medal – second place	2017 Taipei	63 kg
Youth Olympic Games
Bronze medal – third place	2010 Singapore	48 kg

Lucas Lautaro Guzmán (born 17 July 1994) is an Argentine taekwondo athlete. He won a bronze medal at the 2019 World Taekwondo Championships on the men's flyweight category.

He represented Argentina at the 2020 Summer Olympics.
