= Aman Kumar Kadyan =

India Taekwondo athlete (born 1999)

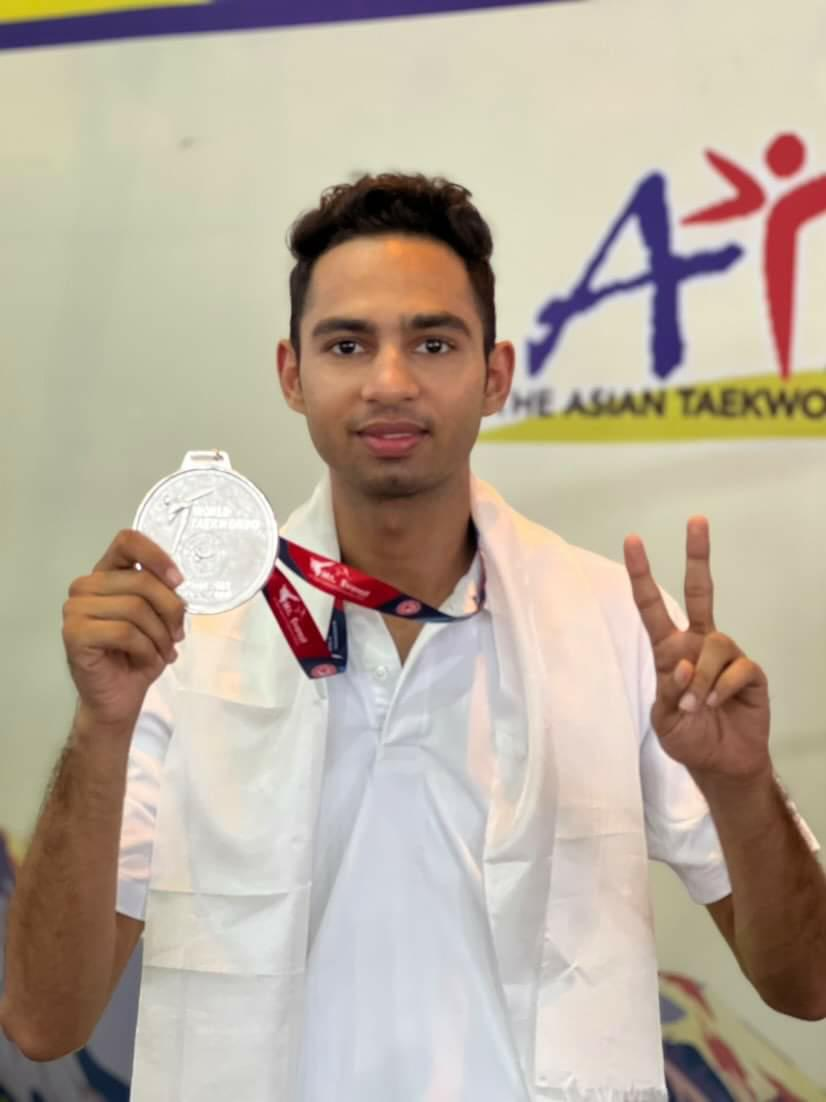

Personal information
- Born: 7 December 1999 Jhajjar Haryana
- Height: 5 ft 10 in (178 cm)
- Weight: 54 KG 58 KG 68 KG

Sport
- Country: India
- Sport: Taekwondo

Aman Kumar Kadyan (born 7 December 1999) is an Indian taekwondo athlete who has represented India in multiple major international competitions. He is the first Indian athlete to compete in both the World Taekwondo Grand Prix Series (Rome 2022) and the World Taekwondo Grand Slam Champions Series (Wuxi 2020). Kadyan has achieved a career-high world ranking of 17th and is also ranked 6th in Asia.

== Career ==
Kadyan began his professional career representing India in the men’s –54 kg division, later competing in –58 kg as well. He reached a career-best world ranking of 17th, becoming one of India's highest-ranked taekwondo athletes.

In 2020, he became the first Indian athlete to participate in the World Taekwondo Grand Slam Champions Series held in Wuxi, China, which served as a qualification pathway for the Tokyo 2020 Olympic Games. He later became the first Indian to compete in the World Taekwondo Grand Prix Series in Rome in 2022.

Kadyan represented India at the Asian Qualification Tournament for the Paris 2024 Olympic Games in Taian, China, competing in the men’s 68 kg category. He also competed in the 2023 World Taekwondo Championships in Baku, Azerbaijan, in the men’s 54 kg division.

In 2019, he became the first Indian athlete to win the China Open title. He later won the gold medal at the Riga Open 2025 in Latvia and secured a bronze medal at the Balkan Open 2025 in Bulgaria.

Earlier in his career, Kadyan won a bronze medal at the Asian Region President’s Cup (Taiwan 2018) and a silver medal at the Oceania Region President’s Cup (Australia 2019).

He also earned a silver medal at the 38th National Games of India. Kadyan has accumulated numerous medals across various World Taekwondo ranking tournaments.

== Major international competitions ==
- World Taekwondo Grand Slam Champions Series — Wuxi, China (2020)
- World Taekwondo Grand Prix Series — Rome, Italy (2022)
- Asian Qualification Tournament for Paris 2024 Olympic Games — Taian, China (68 kg)
- World Taekwondo Championships — Baku, Azerbaijan (2023, 54 kg)
- China Open — Champion (2019)
- Asian Region President's Cup — Bronze (Taiwan, 2018)
- Oceania Region President's Cup — Silver (Australia, 2019)
- Riga Open — Gold (Latvia, 2025)
- Balkan Open — Bronze (Bulgaria, 2025)
- Russian Open — Bronze (2021)

== Rankings ==
- World Ranking: 17th
- Asian Ranking: 6th

== Training ==
Kadyan trains at the Peace Taekwondo Academy in Gurugram, Haryana, under coach Sayad Hassan Rezay of Afghanistan.

== Coaching ==
In 2026, Kadyan began working as a coach at the Peace Taekwondo Academy in Gurugram, Haryana. He has coached athletes representing the academy at international competitions, including the 4th Mt. Everest International Open Taekwondo Championships in Kathmandu, Nepal, in February 2026.
