= Ramnarong Sawekwiharee =

Thai taekwondo practitioner

Personal information
- Nationality: Thai
- Born: 18 December 1996 (age 29) Bangkok, Thailand
- Height: 171 cm (5 ft 7 in)
- Weight: 58 kg (128 lb)

Sport
- Country: Thailand
- Sport: Taekwondo
- Event: –54 kg
Medal record
Representing Thailand
Men's taekwondo
World Championships
Bronze medal – third place	2015 Chelyabinsk	–54 kg
Bronze medal – third place	2017 Muju	–54 kg
Grand Slam (Qualification)
Gold medal – first place	2018 Wuxi (I)	58 kg
Grand Prix
Silver medal – second place	2017 Moscow	–58 kg
Universiade
Bronze medal – third place	2019 Italy	-58 kg
Asian Games
Bronze medal – third place	2014 Incheon	–54 kg
Asian Championships
Silver medal – second place	2016 Manila	–54 kg
Silver medal – second place	2018 Ho Chi Minh City	–54 kg
Southeast Asian Games
Gold medal – first place	2013 Naypiydaw	-54 kg
Gold medal – first place	2017 Kuala Lumpur	-54 kg
Gold medal – first place	2019 Philippines	-54 kg
Silver medal – second place	2023 Cambodia	-54 kg
Asian Youth Games
Gold medal – first place	2013 Nanjing	-53 kg

Ramnarong Sawekwiharee (born December 18, 1996) is a Thai Taekwondo athlete who won two bronze medals at the 2015 World Taekwondo Championships and 2017 World Taekwondo Championships.
