= Georgy Popov (taekwondo) =

Russian taekwondo practitioner

Personal information
- Full name: Georgy Arturovich Popov
- Nationality: Russian
- Born: May 27, 2001 (age 25)

Sport
- Country: Russia
- Sport: Taekwondo
- Event: –54 kg
Medal record
Representing Russia
Men's taekwondo
World Championships
Silver medal – second place	2019 Manchester	54 kg
Grand Prix
Bronze medal – third place	2019 Moscow	58 kg
Youth Olympic Games
Gold medal – first place	2018 Buenos Aires	55 kg
World Junior Championships
Bronze medal – third place	2018 Hammamet	55 kg
European Junior Championships
Gold medal – first place	2017 Larnaca	51 kg

Georgy Arturovich Popov (Russian: Георгий Артурович Попов; born 27 May 2001), is a Russian taekwondo athlete. He won the gold medal at the 2018 Youth Olympics on the Boys' 55 kg.
