= Mikayil Aliyev =

Azerbaijani taekwondo practitioner

Medal record

Men's taekwondo

Representing Azerbaijan

European Championships
Silver medal – second place	2012 Manchester	Finweight

Islamic Solidarity Games
Bronze medal – third place	2013 Palembang	Finweight

Mikayil Aliyev (Azerbaijani: Mikayıl Əliyev, (born 26 January 1994) is an Azerbaijani taekwondo practitioner.

Aliyev won the silver medal at the 2012 European Taekwondo Championships in the men's finweight (under 54 kg) class. At the 2013 Islamic Solidarity Games held in Palembang, Indonesia, he won the bronze medal in the -54 kg division.
