= Mourad Laachraoui =

Belgian taekwondo practitioner

Medal record

Men's taekwondo

Representing Belgium

European Championships
Gold medal – first place	2016 Montreux	-54 kg

Mourad Laachraoui (born 31 March 1995) is a Belgian taekwondo practitioner. He won a gold medal at the 2016 European Taekwondo Championships.

== Career ==
Laachraoui won bronze medals at the Dutch and Belgian Open events in 2013.

In 2015 Laachraoui won a silver medal in the finweight class at the Summer Universiade games after losing to Iran's Armin Hadipour Seighalani in the final. He finished fifth in the men's finweight at the 2015 World Taekwondo Championships. He also won gold medals at the Israel, Fujairah and Alexandria Open tournaments and bronze medals at the Bosnia, Luxor and Swiss Opens.

He won a gold medal in the 2016 European Taekwondo Championships held in Montreux, Switzerland. In the final of the −54 kg division he defeated 18-year-old Spanish fighter Jesús Tortosa 6–3 to win the tournament. After his victory the Flemish taekwondo federation dubbed him "Europe's king of the lightweights".

Laachraoui may be selected to compete at the 2016 Summer Olympics to be held in Rio de Janeiro, Brazil but he wasn't. The quota place for Belgian team in the men's 58 kg was originally earned by Si Mohamed Ketbi via his world ranking position. However, Ketbi has struggled to maintain his weight and was unable to compete at the European Championships. The Belgian Taewkondo Federation is yet to decide between the three candidates that met the standard of being in the top 20 of the global Olympic 58 kg rankings; Laachraoui, ranked 15th, Ketbi, ranked 6th, and Salaheddine Bensaleh, ranked 18, are all eligible but Ketbi went in the end.

== Personal life ==
Laachraoui was born on 31 March 1995. His brother Najim Laachraoui was a terrorist confirmed to be one of the two suicide bombers at the Brussels Airport in the 2016 Brussels bombings. At a press conference following the bombings Mourad Laachraoui said that he was "scared and saddened" by what his brother had done and that "you don't choose your family." He did not have contact with his brother for years before the attack.
