= Chen Po-yen =

Taiwanese para table tennis player

Personal information
- Born: 29 October 2006 (age 19)

Sport
- Sport: Table tennis
- Disability class: 11
Medal record
Men's para table tennis
Representing Chinese Taipei
Paralympic Games
Silver medal – second place	2024 Paris	Singles C11
Asian Para Games
Gold medal – first place	2022 Hangzhou	Singles C11
Silver medal – second place	2022 Hangzhou	Mixed doubles C22

Chen Po-yen (born 29 October 2006) is a Taiwanese para table tennis player.

== Career ==
He competed at the 2024 Summer Paralympics, reaching the finals of the men's individual class 11 event, and won a silver medal.
