= Deniz Dağdelen =

Turkish taekwondo practitioner

Personal information
- Born: 18 July 1997 (age 28) Turkey
- Height: 165 cm (5 ft 5 in)
- Weight: 54 kg (119 lb)

Sport
- Country: Turkey
- Sport: Taekwondo
- Event: Flyweight
Medal record
Representing Turkey
Men's taekwondo
European Championships
Bronze medal – third place	2018 Kazan	54 kg
Bronze medal – third place	2022 Manchester	54 kg
Islamic Solidarity Games
Silver medal – second place	2022 Konya	54 kg
Bronze medal – third place	2017 Baku	54 kg
European U21 Championships
Silver medal – second place	2017 Sofia	54 kg
Bronze medal – third place	2016 Grozny	54 kg

Deniz Dağdelen (born 18 July 1997) is a Turkish taekwondo athlete.

== Career ==
In 2022, Deniz Dağdelen won one of the bronze medals in 54 kg at the 2022 European Taekwondo Championships held in Manchester, England.
