= Taekwondo at the 2020 Summer Olympics – Qualification =

This article details the qualifying phase for taekwondo at the 2020 Summer Olympics. (The Olympics was postponed to at least 2021 due to the COVID-19 pandemic). The competition at these Games will comprise a total of 128 taekwondo fighters coming from their respective NOCs. Each NOC is allowed to enter up to one competitor per event, resulting in a maximum of eight competitors, four of each gender.

Five quota places will be awarded to the top-ranked practitioners in each of the eight weight classes (four per gender) through the World Taekwondo (WT) Olympic rankings, while the highest-ranked practitioner of each weight category on merit points standing will grant one quota place each for their respective NOC through the WT Grand Slam Champions Series. If an NOC has qualified a minimum of two male and a minimum of two female athletes through ranking, it cannot participate in the respective Continental Qualification Tournament, unless it relinquishes the places obtained through ranking.

Four places have been reserved to the host nation Japan, and another four have been invited by the Tripartite Commission. The remaining 120 places are allocated through a qualification process in which athletes have won quota place for their respective NOC. 48 taekwondo fighters, 24 in each gender and the top 6 in each weight category, are eligible to compete through the WT Olympic rankings, while the rest through the five Continental Qualification Tournaments.

If an NOC having qualified through a Qualification Tournament relinquishes a quota place, it would be allocated to the nation of the next highest placed athlete in the respective weight category of that tournament as long as the addition of the place does not exceed the maximum quota for that nation.

== Timeline ==
Event	Date	Venue
WT Olympic Rankings	December 7, 2019	—
WT Grand Slam Series Rankings	December 20, 2019	—
African Qualification Tournament	February 22–23, 2020	Rabat, Morocco
Oceania Qualification Tournament	February 29, 2020	Gold Coast, Australia
Pan American Qualification Tournament	March 11–12, 2020	Heredia, Costa Rica
European Qualification Tournament	May 7–8, 2021	Sofia, Bulgaria (Note: The European Qualification Tournament was originally scheduled to be held on April 24–25, 2020 in Milan but was moved to Moscow, Russia due to the COVID-19 pandemic in Italy. It was moved once again to Sofia, Bulgaria.)
Asian Qualification Tournament	May 21–22, 2021	Amman, Jordan (Note: The qualifying tournament was moved from Wuxi to Amman because of the COVID-19 pandemic.)

== Qualification summary ==
The following table summarises the outcome of qualification for the taekwondo tournament at the 2020 Olympics. 57 nations gained at least one quota place for Tokyo. China and South Korea were the most successful nation, gaining six places each, followed by the leading European nations, Great Britain and Turkey with five apiece. The Tripartite Commission quotas were announced on June 24, 2021.

NOC	Men				Women				Total
NOC	−58 kg	−68 kg	−80 kg	+80 kg	−49 kg	−57 kg	−67 kg	+67 kg	Total
Afghanistan				Yes					1
Argentina	Yes								1
Australia	Yes		Yes			Yes		Yes	4
Azerbaijan			Yes				Yes		2
Belgium		Yes							1
Bosnia and Herzegovina		Yes							1
Brazil		Yes	Yes				Yes		3
Burkina Faso			Yes						1
Canada					Yes	Yes			2
China		Yes		Yes	Yes	Yes	Yes	Yes	6
Chinese Taipei		Yes	Yes		Yes	Yes			4
Colombia	Yes				Yes				2
Croatia			Yes	Yes	Yes		Yes		4
Costa Rica						Yes			1
Cuba				Yes					1
Democratic Republic of the Congo							Yes		1
Dominican Republic		Yes	Yes					Yes	3
Egypt		Yes	Yes		Yes		Yes		4
Ethiopia	Yes								1
France							Yes	Yes	2
Gabon				Yes					1
Germany				Yes					1
Great Britain		Yes		Yes		Yes	Yes	Yes	5
Greece						Yes			1
Haiti							Yes		1
Honduras								Yes	1
Hungary	Yes								1
Iran	Yes	Yes				Yes			3
Ireland	Yes								1
Israel					Yes				1
Italy	Yes		Yes						2
Ivory Coast			Yes	Yes			Yes	Yes	4
Japan	Yes	Yes			Yes	Yes			4
Jordan			Yes				Yes		2
Kazakhstan				Yes				Yes	2
Kenya								Yes	1
Mali		Yes							1
Mexico				Yes				Yes	2
Morocco			Yes		Yes	Yes			3
Netherlands								Yes	1
New Zealand		Yes							1
Niger				Yes		Yes			2
Nigeria							Yes		1
North Macedonia				Yes					1
Norway			Yes						1
Philippines	Yes								1
Poland						Yes		Yes	2
Portugal	Yes								1
Puerto Rico					Yes				1
Refugee Olympic Team		Yes			Yes	Yes			3
ROC	Yes		Yes	Yes		Yes			4
Serbia					Yes			Yes	2
Slovenia				Yes					1
South Korea	Yes	Yes		Yes	Yes	Yes		Yes	6
Spain	Yes	Yes	Yes		Yes				4
Thailand	Yes				Yes				2
Tonga				Yes			Yes		2
Tunisia	Yes								1
Turkey		Yes			Yes	Yes	Yes	Yes	5
United States						Yes	Yes		2
Uzbekistan		Yes	Yes				Yes	Yes	4
Vietnam					Yes				1
Total: 62 NOCs	16	17	16	16	17	17	16	16	131

== Men's events ==
Quota places are allocated to the respective NOC and not to competitor that achieved the place in the qualification event.

=== −58 kg ===
Competition	Places	Qualified athletes
WT Olympic Rankings (as of December 2019)	6	Jang Jun (KOR); Vito Dell'Aquila (ITA); Jesús Tortosa (ESP); Armin Hadipour (IRI); Mikhail Artamonov (ROC); Jack Woolley (IRL) (Note: With the Grand Slam winner already qualified through the Olympic Rankings, the spot for the Grand Slam winner was re-allocated to the Olympic Rankings.)
WT Grand Slam Series Rankings	0	—
African Qualification Tournament	2	Solomon Demse (ETH); Mohamed Khalil Jendoubi (TUN)
Oceania Qualification Tournament	1	Safwan Khalil (AUS)
Pan American Qualification Tournament	2	Lucas Guzmán (ARG); Jefferson Ochoa (COL)
European Qualification Tournament	2	Omar Salim (HUN); Rui Bragança (POR)
Asian Qualification Tournament	2	Kurt Bryan Barbosa (PHI); Ramnarong Sawekwiharee (THA)
Host nation / Universality places	1	Sergio Suzuki (JPN)
Total	16	

=== −68 kg ===
Competition	Places	Qualified athletes
WT Olympic Rankings (as of December 2019)	6	Lee Dae-hoon (KOR); Bradly Sinden (GBR); Zhao Shuai (CHN); Javier Pérez (ESP); Jaouad Achab (BEL); Mirhashem Hosseini (IRI)
WT Grand Slam Series Rankings	0	—
African Qualification Tournament	2	Abdelrahman Wael (EGY); Seydou Fofana (MLI)
Oceania Qualification Tournament	1	Tom Burns (NZL)
Pan American Qualification Tournament	2	Edival Pontes (BRA); Bernardo Pié (DOM)
European Qualification Tournament	2	Nedžad Husić (BIH); Hakan Reçber (TUR)
Asian Qualification Tournament	2	Huang Yu-jen (TPE); Ulugbek Rashitov (UZB)
Host nation / Universality places	1	Ricardo Suzuki (JPN)
Additional	1	Abdullah Sediqi (EOR)
Total	17	

=== −80 kg ===
Competition	Places	Qualified athletes
WT Olympic Rankings (as of December 2019)	6	Maksim Khramtsov (ROC); Milad Beigi (AZE); Cheick Sallah Cissé (CIV); Nikita Rafalovich (UZB); Raúl Martínez (ESP); Toni Kanaet (CRO)
WT Grand Slam Series Rankings	0	—
African Qualification Tournament	2	Seif Eissa (EGY); Achraf Mahboubi (MAR)
Oceania Qualification Tournament	1	Jack Marton (AUS)
Pan American Qualification Tournament	2	Ícaro Miguel Soares (BRA); Moisés Hernández (DOM)
European Qualification Tournament	2	Simone Alessio (ITA); Richard Ordemann (NOR)
Asian Qualification Tournament	2	Saleh El-Sharabaty (JOR); Liu Wei-ting (TPE)
Host nation / Universality places	1	Faysal Sawadogo (BUR)
Total	16	

=== +80 kg ===
Competition	Places	Qualified athletes
WT Olympic Rankings (as of December 2019)	6	Vladislav Larin (ROC); In Kyo-don (KOR); Alexander Bachmann (GER); Abdoul Razak Issoufou (NIG); Ivan Trajkovič (SLO); Mahama Cho (GBR)
WT Grand Slam Series Rankings	0	—
African Qualification Tournament	2	Seydou Gbané (CIV); Anthony Obame (GAB)
Oceania Qualification Tournament	1	Pita Taufatofua (TGA)
Pan American Qualification Tournament	2	Rafael Alba (CUB); Carlos Sansores (MEX)
European Qualification Tournament	2	Ivan Šapina (CRO); Dejan Georgievski (MKD)
Asian Qualification Tournament	2	Sun Hongyi (CHN); Ruslan Zhaparov (KAZ)
Host nation / Universality places	1	Farzad Mansouri (AFG)
Total	16	

== Women's events ==
Quota places are allocated to the respective NOC and not to competitor that achieved the place in the qualification event.

=== −49 kg ===
Competition	Places	Qualified athletes
WT Olympic Rankings (as of December 2019)	7	Panipak Wongpattanakit (THA); Sim Jae-young (KOR); Tijana Bogdanović (SRB); Rukiye Yıldırım (TUR); Kristina Tomić (CRO); Wu Jingyu (CHN); Yvette Yong (CAN) (Note: No eligible athlete contested the Oceania Qualification Tournament, and this quota was redistributed to Yvette Yong of Canada.)
WT Grand Slam Series Rankings	0	—
African Qualification Tournament	2	Nour Abdelsalam (EGY); Oumaima El-Bouchti (MAR)
Oceania Qualification Tournament	0	—
Pan American Qualification Tournament	2	Andrea Ramírez (COL); Victoria Stambaugh (PUR)
European Qualification Tournament	2	Adriana Cerezo (ESP); Avishag Semberg (ISR)
Asian Qualification Tournament	2	Su Po-ya (TPE); Trương Thị Kim Tuyền (VIE)
Host nation / Universality places	1	Miyu Yamada (JPN)
Additional	1	Dina Pouryounes (EOR)
Total	17	

=== −57 kg ===
Competition	Places	Qualified athletes
WT Olympic Rankings (as of December 2019)	5	Jade Jones (GBR); Lee Ah-reum (KOR); Tatiana Kudashova (ROC); Hatice Kübra İlgün (TUR); Skylar Park (CAN)
WT Grand Slam Series Rankings	1	Zhou Lijun (CHN)
African Qualification Tournament	2	Nada Laaraj (MAR); Tekiath Ben Yessouf (NIG)
Oceania Qualification Tournament	1	Stacey Hymer (AUS)
Pan American Qualification Tournament	2	Anastasija Zolotic (USA); Nishy Lee Lindo (CRC) (Note: Fernanda Aguirre of Chile originally won the quota but she had to withdraw after testing positive for COVID-19.)
European Qualification Tournament	2	Fani Tzeli (GRE); Patrycja Adamkiewicz (POL)
Asian Qualification Tournament	2	Nahid Kiani (IRI); Lo Chia-ling (TPE)
Host nation / Universality places	1	Mayu Hamada (JPN)
Additional	1	Kimia Alizadeh (EOR)
Total	17	

=== −67 kg ===
Competition	Places	Qualified athletes
WT Olympic Rankings (as of December 2019)	6	Ruth Gbagbi (CIV); Nur Tatar (TUR); Matea Jelić (CRO); Lauren Williams (GBR); Zhang Mengyu (CHN); Paige McPherson (USA)
WT Grand Slam Series Rankings	0	—
African Qualification Tournament	2	Hedaya Malak (EGY); Elizabeth Anyanacho (NGR)
Oceania Qualification Tournament	1	Malia Paseka (TGA)
Pan American Qualification Tournament	2	Milena Titoneli (BRA); Aliyah Shipman (HAI)
European Qualification Tournament	2	Farida Azizova (AZE); Magda Wiet-Hénin (FRA)
Asian Qualification Tournament	2	Julyana Al-Sadeq (JOR); Nigora Tursunkulova (UZB)
Host nation / Universality places	1	Naomie Katoka (COD)
Total	16	

=== +67 kg ===
Competition	Places	Qualified athletes
WT Olympic Rankings (as of December 2019)	6	Bianca Walkden (GBR); Zheng Shuyin (CHN); Lee Da-bin (KOR); Milica Mandić (SRB); Nafia Kuş (TUR); Aleksandra Kowalczuk (POL)
WT Grand Slam Series Rankings	0	—
African Qualification Tournament	2	Aminata Traoré (CIV); Faith Ogallo (KEN)
Oceania Qualification Tournament	1	Reba Stewart (AUS)
Pan American Qualification Tournament	2	Katherine Rodríguez (DOM); Briseida Acosta (MEX)
European Qualification Tournament	2	Althéa Laurin (FRA); Reshmie Oogink (NED)
Asian Qualification Tournament	2	Cansel Deniz (KAZ); Svetlana Osipova (UZB)
Host nation / Universality places	1	Keyla Ávila (HON)
Total	16	
