= 2020 African Taekwondo Olympic Qualification Tournament =

Taekwondo competition

The 2020 African Qualification Tournament for Tokyo Olympic Games was held in Rabat, Morocco from February 22 to February 23, 2020. Each country may enter a maximum of 2 male and 2 female divisions with only one athlete in each division. The winner and runner-up athletes per division qualify for the Olympic Games under their NOC.

== Qualification summary ==
NOC	Men				Women				Total
NOC	−58kg	−68kg	−80kg	+80kg	−49kg	−57kg	−67kg	+67kg	Total
Egypt		X	X		X		X		4
Ethiopia	X								1
Gabon				X					1
Ivory Coast				X				X	2
Kenya								X	1
Mali		X							1
Morocco			X		X	X			3
Niger						X			1
Nigeria							X		1
Tunisia	X								1
Total: 10 NOCs	2	2	2	2	2	2	2	2	16

== Men ==
=== −58 kg ===
22 February

Round of 16
Jean Paul Sekanyambo (RWA)	11
Frederico Muianga (MOZ)	1
Marumo Moloisane (LES)	5
Ahmed Mohamed Osman (SUD)	8
Casimir Djinodi (CHA)	5
Solomon Demse (ETH)	7
Omar Robleh (DJI)	DQ
~~Saddat Boni Biao (BEN)~~
Wandile Maziya (SWZ)	4
Mohamed Guerfi (ALG)	19

Quarterfinals
Moustapha Kama (SEN)	19
Jean Paul Sekanyambo (RWA)	12
Ahmed Mohamed Osman (SUD)	0
Solomon Demse (ETH)	37
Mohamed Khalil Jendoubi (TUN)	48
Omar Robleh (DJI)	3
Mohamed Guerfi (ALG)	4
Omar Lakehal (MAR)	15

Semifinals
Moustapha Kama (SEN)	6
Solomon Demse (ETH)	18
Mohamed Khalil Jendoubi (TUN)	21
Omar Lakehal (MAR)	4

3rd place
Moustapha Kama (SEN)	DQ
~~Omar Lakehal (MAR)~~

=== −68 kg ===
23 February

Round of 32
Seydou Fofana (MLI)	17–0	Lazarus Maringehosi (ZIM)

Round of 16
Ismael Yacouba (NIG)	9
Seydou Fofana (MLI)	16
Ramadan El-Wafi (LBA)	4
Joseph Phiri (MAW)	2
Ifeoluwa Ajayi (NGR)	35
Steve Rakotobe (MAD)	5
Suliaman Sesay (SLE)	11
Jehudiel Kiki (BEN)	14
Tariku Girma (ETH)	14
Sanderson Vicente (CPV)	3
Edwin Leshao (KEN)	17
Wardell Samotshozo (BOT)	11
Abdalaziz Abdalla (SUD)	12
Ibrahim Maïga (BUR)	23
Saneliso Masuku (SWZ)	0
Abdelrahman Wael (EGY)	21

Quarterfinals
Seydou Fofana (MLI)	17
Ramadan El-Wafi (LBA)	2
Ifeoluwa Ajayi (NGR)	14
Jehudiel Kiki (BEN)	6
Tariku Girma (ETH)	12
Edwin Leshao (KEN)	5
Ibrahim Maïga (BUR)	0
Abdelrahman Wael (EGY)	3

Semifinals
Seydou Fofana (MLI)	17
Ifeoluwa Ajayi (NGR)	3
Tariku Girma (ETH)	3
Abdelrahman Wael (EGY)	9

3rd place
Ifeoluwa Ajayi (NGR)	5
Tariku Girma (ETH)	17

=== −80 kg ===
23 February

Round of 16
Juan Manuel Rondo Epitie (GEQ)	5
Ernest Samotshozo (BOT)	11

Quarterfinals
Seif Eissa (EGY)	17
Ernest Samotshozo (BOT)	9
Ababacar Sadikh Soumaré (SEN)	6
Firas Katoussi (TUN)	18
Faysal Sawadogo (BUR)	22
Islam Guetfaya (ALG)	8
Hermen Doupassou (GAB)
Achraf Mahboubi (MAR)	RSC

Semifinals
Seif Eissa (EGY)	3
Firas Katoussi (TUN)	1
Faysal Sawadogo (BUR)	9
Achraf Mahboubi (MAR)	14

3rd place
Firas Katoussi (TUN)	4
Faysal Sawadogo (BUR)	3

=== +80 kg ===
22 February

Quarterfinals		Semifinals		3rd place
		Anthony Obame (GAB)	19
Itai Sango (MOZ)	0	Benjamin Okuomose (NGR)	17
Benjamin Okuomose (NGR)	12			Benjamin Okuomose (NGR)	27
Karamoko Soumaré (MLI)	20			Newton Nambani (KEN)	2
Newton Nambani (KEN)	22	Newton Nambani (KEN)	5
Taha Al-Aswed (LBA)	3	Seydou Gbané (CIV)	36
Seydou Gbané (CIV)	6

== Women ==
=== −49 kg ===
22 February

Round of 16
Ida Bama (BUR)	DQ
~~Marie Egagne (CMR)~~
Munirah Abdiwahid (SOM)	6
Karabo Kula (BOT)	22

Quarterfinals
Nour Abdelsalam (EGY)	9
Ida Bama (BUR)	0
Célia Truzão (MOZ)	4
Chaima Toumi (TUN)	28
Michelle Tau (LES)	7
Ngoné Fall (SEN)	9
Karabo Kula (BOT)	4
Oumaima El-Bouchti (MAR)	11

Semifinals
Nour Abdelsalam (EGY)	12
Chaima Toumi (TUN)	4
Ngoné Fall (SEN)	9
Oumaima El-Bouchti (MAR)	27

3rd place
Chaima Toumi (TUN)	WD
Ngoné Fall (SEN)

=== −57 kg ===
23 February

Round of 16
Sahondra Rakotoanosy (MAD)	1
Yacine Diaw (SEN)	22
Nesrine Ayari (TUN)	24
Rethabile Tjotjo (LES)	0
Aline Ndacyayisenga (RWA)	11
Nesrine Soualili (ALG)	14

Quarterfinals
Nada Laaraj (MAR)	22
Yacine Diaw (SEN)	1
Eunice Adedapo (GHA)	19
Tsebaot Fikadu (ETH)	15
Tekiath Ben Yessouf (NIG)	19
Nesrine Ayari (TUN)	10
Nesrine Soualili (ALG)	3
Chinazum Nwosu (NGR)	20

Semifinals
Nada Laaraj (MAR)	30
Eunice Adedapo (GHA)	1
Tekiath Ben Yessouf (NIG)	34
Chinazum Nwosu (NGR)	10

3rd place
Eunice Adedapo (GHA)	0
Chinazum Nwosu (NGR)	16

=== −67 kg ===
22 February

Quarterfinals		Semifinals		3rd place
		Hedaya Malak (EGY)	30
Everlyn Aluoch (KEN)	1	Everlyn Aluoch (KEN)	4
Naomie Katoka (COD)	0			Everlyn Aluoch (KEN)	2
				Urgence Mouega (GAB)	39
		Elizabeth Anyanacho (NGR)	12
		Urgence Mouega (GAB)	5

=== +67 kg ===
23 February

Quarterfinals		Semifinals		3rd place
		Aminata Traoré (CIV)	16
Marina Ndong (GAB)		Raulline Soffo (CMR)	0
Raulline Soffo (CMR)	RSC			Raulline Soffo (CMR)	4
				Florence Eldjouma (CHA)	12
		Florence Eldjouma (CHA)	21
		Faith Ogallo (KEN)	27
