= 2024 African Taekwondo Olympic Qualification Tournament =

Taekwondo competition

The 2024 African Qualification Tournament for Paris Olympic Games was held in Dakar Arena, Diamniadio, Dakar, Senegal on 10 and 11 February 2024. Each country could enter a maximum of 2 male and 2 female divisions with only one athlete in each division. The two finalists for each division qualified for the Olympic Games under their National Olympic Committee.

== Men ==
=== −58 kg ===
10 February

Round of 16
Osamah Amtawaa (LBA)	4	7
Maxwell Manson (SLE)	2	6
Youssouf Simpara (MLI)	4	4	10
Zemedkun Zeleke (ETH)	5	0	6
~~Jopiza Gnolo (CMR)~~
Casimir Betel (CHA)	DQ
Abdoul Aziz Diawara (GUI)	5	13
Mfanawekhaya Dube (SWZ)	5	3
Benson Addo (GHA)	2	7	3
Oswaldo Ocira (UGA)	12	4	6

Quarterfinals
Nouridine Issaka (NIG)	8	12
Osamah Amtawaa (LBA)	0	0
Youssouf Simpara (MLI)	3	1	1
Casimir Betel (CHA)	2	4	3
Bocar Diop (SEN)	12	9
Abdoul Aziz Diawara (GUI)	2	3
Oswaldo Ocira (UGA)	3	0
Issa Diakité (CIV)	7	14

Semifinals
Nouridine Issaka (NIG)	7	4	5
Casimir Betel (CHA)	2	6	1
Bocar Diop (SEN)	1	5
Issa Diakité (CIV)	0	5

3rd place
Casimir Betel (CHA)	1	7	1
Issa Diakité (CIV)	3	7	2

=== −68 kg ===
11 February

Round of 16
Ahmed Nassar (EGY)	4	14
Getnet Atnafu (ETH)	3	0
Jonathan Bouassa (CGO)	1	0
Nicalas Fernandes (CPV)	3	1
Mohamed Fofana (MLI)	12	3
Ifeoluwa Ajayi (NGR)	4	2
~~Mananarivotsiv'hery Rasolofo (MAD)~~
Moussa Amar Cissé (GAB)	DQ
Mouhamadou Lo (SEN)	6	5
Wandile Maziya (SWZ)	4	0
Robert Zink (STP)	2	0
Edward Holland (SLE)	14	12
Najimuldin Birzeeq (LBA)	1	11
Wardell Samotshozo (BOT)	1	8
Thierno Diallo (GUI)	0	1
Ibrahim Maïga (BUR)	12	15

Quarterfinals
Ahmed Nassar (EGY)	12	13
Nicalas Fernandes (CPV)	0	5
Mohamed Fofana (MLI)	2	6
Moussa Amar Cissé (GAB)	1	2
Mouhamadou Lo (SEN)	7	3
Edward Holland (SLE)	6	1
Najimuldin Birzeeq (LBA)	0	4
Ibrahim Maïga (BUR)	12	13

Semifinals
Ahmed Nassar (EGY)	8	4	13
Mohamed Fofana (MLI)	6	9	12
Mouhamadou Lo (SEN)	2	10	0
Ibrahim Maïga (BUR)	7	8	0

3rd place
Mohamed Fofana (MLI)	WD
Mouhamadou Lo (SEN)

=== −80 kg ===
10 February

Quarterfinals				Semifinals			3rd place
				Firas Katoussi (TUN)	5	8^{WD}
Ernest Samotshozo (BOT)	7	2	2	Arnold Nkoy (COD)	0	0
Arnold Nkoy (COD)	6	4	15				Arnold Nkoy (COD)
							Soufiane El-Asbi (MAR)	WD
				Soufiane El-Asbi (MAR)	5	6
				Faysal Sawadogo (BUR)	5	8

=== +80 kg ===
11 February

Quarterfinals
Ayoub Bassel (MAR)	7^{P}	18
Moses Obara (KEN)	3	6
Paivou Gomis (GBS)	1	2
Abdoul Razak Issoufou (NIG)	8	10
Anthony Obame (GAB)	2	5
Benjamin Okuomose (NGR)	1	5
Frédéric Hongbe Adoua (CHA)	0	3
Alasan Ann (GAM)	6	8

Semifinals
Ayoub Bassel (MAR)	2	3
Abdoul Razak Issoufou (NIG)	6	9
Anthony Obame (GAB)	2	2	0
Alasan Ann (GAM)	2	4	0

3rd place
Ayoub Bassel (MAR)
Anthony Obame (GAB)	WD

== Women ==
=== −49 kg ===
10 February

Round of 16
Karabo Kula (BOT)	0	0
Zaraou Abdou Bilane (NIG)	10	8
Munirah Abdiwahid (SOM)	3	6
Flore Mbubu (COD)	3	4
Chinazum Nwosu (NGR)	0	4	0
Aissata Siby (MLI)	0	3	2
Ikram Dhahri (TUN)	9	10
Amina Jebel (ETH)	0	0
Sadia-Leochon Kembi (CAF)	5	0
Henrietta Armah (GHA)	14	8
Ngone Fall (SEN)	10	15
Nonhle Maduna (SWZ)	5	3

Quarterfinals
Michelle Tau (LES)	4	4
Zaraou Abdou Bilane (NIG)	1	3
Munirah Abdiwahid (SOM)	0	0
Aissata Siby (MLI)	9^{P}	10
Ikram Dhahri (TUN)	6	0
Henrietta Armah (GHA)	0	0
Ngone Fall (SEN)	1	0
Jana Khattab (EGY)	13	9

Semifinals
Michelle Tau (LES)	4	2	9
Aissata Siby (MLI)	2	3	1
Ikram Dhahri (TUN)	5	9
Jana Khattab (EGY)	0	2

3rd place
Aissata Siby (MLI)	0	1
Jana Khattab (EGY)	4	19

=== −57 kg ===
11 February

Round of 16
Nadia Omar (SOM)	3	1
Tsiyon Balew (ETH)	5	2
Maria Marchlinski (GAM)	3	2	8
Trinity Noble (SLE)	1	14	6

Quarterfinals
Nada Laaraj (MAR)	13	4
Tsiyon Balew (ETH)	0	3
Maïmouna Konaté (MLI)	1	8
Emmanuella Atora (GAB)	15	14
Yacine Diaw (SEN)	13	10
Eunice Adedapo (GHA)	6	0
Maria Marchlinski (GAM)	2	0
Chaima Toumi (TUN)	10	9

Semifinals
Nada Laaraj (MAR)	5	4	0
Emmanuella Atora (GAB)	4	4	3
Yacine Diaw (SEN)	0	7	2
Chaima Toumi (TUN)	3	5	7

3rd place
Nada Laaraj (MAR)
Yacine Diaw (SEN)	WD

=== −67 kg ===
11 February

Quarterfinals				Semifinals			3rd place
				Aya Shehata (EGY)	12	13
Madinatou Moussa (NIG)	3	3	3	Madinatou Moussa (NIG)	0	1
Kadidja Koutoubali (CHA)	6	2	3				Madinatou Moussa (NIG)	4	13	5
							Jully Musangi (KEN)	11	8	9
				Jully Musangi (KEN)	0	0
				Elizabeth Anyanacho (NGR)	11	14

=== +67 kg ===
10 February

Quarterfinals			Semifinals			3rd place
			Fatima-Ezzahra Aboufaras (MAR)	9	10
Verónica Mbang (GEQ)	10	8	Verónica Mbang (GEQ)	2	2
Carlota Munave (SWZ)	6	5				Verónica Mbang (GEQ)	2	5	3
						Urgence Mouega (GAB)	8	3	3
			Astan Bathily (CIV)	4	5
			Urgence Mouega (GAB)	1	4
