= Ivory Coast at the 2020 Summer Olympics =

- IOC code: CIV
- NOC: Comité National Olympique de Côte d'Ivoire

in Tokyo, Japan July 23, 2021 – August 8, 2021
- Competitors: 31 in 6 sports
- Flag bearers (opening): Marie-Josée Ta Lou; Cheick Sallah Cissé
- Flag bearer (closing): Marie-Josée Ta Lou
- Medals Ranked 86th: Gold 0 Silver 0 Bronze 1 Total 1

Summer Olympics appearances (overview)
- 1964; 1968; 1972; 1976; 1980; 1984; 1988; 1992; 1996; 2000; 2004; 2008; 2012; 2016; 2020; 2024

Ivory Coast, also known as Côte d'Ivoire and officially as the Republic of Côte d'Ivoire, competed at the 2020 Summer Olympics in Tokyo. Originally scheduled to take place from 24 July to 9 August 2020, the Games were postponed to 23 July to 8 August 2021, because of the COVID-19 pandemic. It was the nation's fourteenth appearance at the Summer Olympics.

== Medalists ==
Medal	Name	Sport	Event	Date
Bronze	Ruth Gbagbi	Taekwondo	Women's 67 kg	26 July

== Competitors ==
The following is the list of number of competitors in the Games. Note that reserves in football are not counted:

Sport	Men	Women	Total
Athletics	1	2	3
Football	21	0	21
Judo	0	1	1
Rowing	1	0	1
Swimming	0	1	1
Taekwondo	2	2	4
Total	25	6	31

== Athletics ==
Ivorian athletes achieved the entry standards, either by qualifying time or by world ranking, in the following track and field events (up to a maximum of 3 athletes in each event):

Key

- Note–Ranks given for track events are within the athlete's heat only
- Q = Qualified for the next round
- q = Qualified for the next round as a fastest loser or, in field events, by position without achieving the qualifying target
- NR = National record
- N/A = Round not applicable for the event
- Bye = Athlete not required to compete in round

Track & road events

Athlete	Event	Heat		Quarterfinal		Semifinal		Final	
Athlete	Event	Result	Rank	Result	Rank	Result	Rank	Result	Rank
Arthur Cissé	Men's 100 m	Bye		10.15	2 Q	10.18	7	Did not advance	
Murielle Ahouré	Women's 100 m	Bye		11.16 SB	3 Q	11.28	7	Did not advance	
Marie-Josée Ta Lou	Women's 100 m	Bye		10.78 AR	1 Q	10.79	1 Q	10.91	4
Marie-Josée Ta Lou	Women's 200 m	22.30	1 Q	—		22.11 SB	1 Q	22.27	5

== Football ==
Summary

Key:

- A.E.T – After extra time.
- P – Match decided by penalty-shootout.

Team	Event	Group stage				Quarterfinal	Semifinal	Final / BM	
Team	Event	Opposition Score	Opposition Score	Opposition Score	Rank	Opposition Score	Opposition Score	Opposition Score	Rank
Ivory Coast men's	Men's tournament	Saudi Arabia; W 2–1	Brazil; D 0–0	Germany; D 1–1	2 Q	Spain; L 2–5	Did not advance		

=== Men's tournament ===
Ivory Coast men's football team qualified for the Games by advancing to the final match of the 2019 Africa U-23 Cup of Nations, signifying the country's recurrence to the Olympic tournament after a twelve-year absence.

Team roster

Ivory Coast's final squad was announced on 3 July 2021.

Head coach: Soualiho Haïdara

No.	Pos.	Player	Date of birth (age)	Club
1	GK	Maxime Nagoli	20 December 2000 (aged 20)	(Ivorian Football Federation) Sol
2	DF	Silas Gnaka	18 December 1998 (aged 22)	(Royal Belgian Football Association) Eupen
3	DF	Eric Bailly*	12 April 1994 (aged 27)	(The Football Association) Manchester United
4	DF	Kouadio-Yves Dabila	1 January 1997 (aged 24)	(Royal Belgian Football Association) Mouscron
5	DF	Ismaël Diallo	29 January 1997 (aged 24)	(French Football Federation) Ajaccio
6	DF	Wilfried Singo	25 December 2000 (aged 20)	(Italian Football Federation) Torino
7	MF	Idrissa Doumbia	14 April 1998 (aged 23)	(Royal Spanish Football Federation) Huesca
8	MF	Franck Kessié*	19 December 1996 (aged 24)	(Italian Football Federation) Milan
9	FW	Youssouf Dao	5 March 1998 (aged 23)	(Football Association of the Czech Republic) Sparta Praha
10	FW	Amad Diallo	11 July 2002 (aged 19)	(The Football Association) Manchester United
11	FW	Christian Kouamé	6 December 1997 (aged 23)	(Italian Football Federation) Fiorentina
12	MF	Eboue Kouassi	13 December 1997 (aged 23)	(Royal Belgian Football Association) Genk
13	FW	Kader Keïta	6 November 2000 (aged 20)	(Royal Belgian Football Association) Westerlo
14	FW	Parfait Guiagon	22 February 2001 (aged 20)	(Israel Football Association) Beitar Tel Aviv
15	FW	Max Gradel* (captain)	30 November 1987 (aged 33)	(Turkish Football Federation) Sivasspor
16	GK	Ira Eliezer Tapé	31 August 1997 (aged 23)	(Ivorian Football Federation) San Pedro
17	DF	Zié Ouattara	9 January 2000 (aged 21)	(Portuguese Football Federation) Vitória Guimarães
18	FW	Cheick Timité	20 November 1997 (aged 23)	(French Football Federation) Amiens
19	DF	Koffi Kouao	20 May 1998 (aged 23)	(Portuguese Football Federation) Vizela
20	FW	Aboubacar Doumbia	12 November 1999 (aged 21)	(Israel Football Association) Maccabi Netanya
22	GK	Nicolas Tié	13 February 2001 (aged 20)	(Portuguese Football Federation) Vitória Guimarães

* Overage player.

Group play

Pos	Team	Pld	W	D	L	GF	GA	GD	Pts	Qualification
1	Brazil	3	2	1	0	7	3	+4	7	Advance to knockout stage
2	Ivory Coast	3	1	2	0	3	2	+1	5	Advance to knockout stage
3	Germany	3	1	1	1	6	7	−1	4	
4	Saudi Arabia	3	0	0	3	4	8	−4	0	

Source: TOCOG and FIFA
Rules for classification: Group stage tiebreakers
22 July 2021
17:30

Ivory Coast	2–1	Saudi Arabia
Al-Amri 39' (o.g.); Kessié 66'	Report (TOCOG); Report (FIFA)	Al-Dawsari 44'

International Stadium Yokohama, Yokohama
Referee: Matthew Conger (New Zealand)

25 July 2021
17:30

Brazil	0–0	Ivory Coast
	Report (TOCOG); Report (FIFA)

International Stadium Yokohama, Yokohama
Referee: Ismail Elfath (United States)

28 July 2021
17:00

Germany	1–1	Ivory Coast
Löwen 73'	Report (TOCOG); Report (FIFA)	Henrichs 67' (o.g.)

Miyagi Stadium, Rifu
Attendance: 4,294
Referee: Leodán González (Uruguay)

Quarter final

31 July 2021
17:00

Spain	5–2 (a.e.t.)	Ivory Coast
Olmo 30'; Mir 90+3', 117', 120+1'; Oyarzabal 98' (pen.)	Report (TOCOG); Report (FIFA)	Bailly 10'; Gradel 90+1'

Miyagi Stadium, Rifu
Attendance: 5,526
Referee: Jesús Valenzuela (Venezuela)

== Judo ==
Ivory Coast qualified one judoka for the women's lightweight category (57 kg) at the Games. Rio 2016 Olympian Zouleiha Abzetta Dabonne accepted a continental berth from Africa as the nation's top-ranked judoka outside of direct qualifying position in the IJF World Ranking List of June 28, 2021.

Athlete	Event	Round of 32	Round of 16	Quarterfinals	Semifinals	Repechage	Final / BM	
Athlete	Event	Opposition Result	Opposition Result	Opposition Result	Opposition Result	Opposition Result	Opposition Result	Rank
Zouleiha Abzetta Dabonne	Women's −57 kg	Monteiro (POR); L 00–10	Did not advance					

== Rowing ==
Ivory Coast qualified one boat in the men's single sculls for the Games by finishing sixth in the A-final and securing the fourth of five berths available at the 2019 FISA African Olympic Qualification Regatta in Tunis, Tunisia, marking the country's debut in the sport.

Athlete	Event	Heats		Repechage		Quarterfinals		Semifinals		Final	
Athlete	Event	Time	Rank	Time	Rank	Time	Rank	Time	Rank	Time	Rank
Franck N'Dri	Men's single sculls	7:49.19	5 R	8:03.25	5 SE/F	Bye		7:55.12	2 FE	7:42.55	28

Qualification Legend: FA=Final A (medal); FB=Final B (non-medal); FC=Final C (non-medal); FD=Final D (non-medal); FE=Final E (non-medal); FF=Final F (non-medal); SA/B=Semifinals A/B; SC/D=Semifinals C/D; SE/F=Semifinals E/F; QF=Quarterfinals; R=Repechage

== Swimming ==
Ivory Coast received a universality invitation from FINA to send a top-ranked female swimmer in her respective individual events to the Olympics, based on the FINA Points System of June 28, 2021.

Athlete	Event	Heat		Final	
Athlete	Event	Time	Rank	Time	Rank
Talita Te Flan	Women's 400 m freestyle	4:38.92	25	Did not advance	

== Taekwondo ==
Ivory Coast entered four athletes into the taekwondo competition at the Games. Defending Olympic champion Cheick Sallah Cissé (men's 80 kg) and Rio 2016 bronze medalist Ruth Gbagbi (women's 67 kg) qualified directly for their respective weight classes by finishing among the top five taekwondo practitioners at the end of the WT Olympic Rankings. Meanwhile, reigning African Games champion Seydou Gbané and twenty-year-old rookie Aminata Traoré secured the remaining spots on the Ivorian taekwondo squad with a top two finish each in the men's (+80 kg) and women's heavyweight category (+67 kg), respectively at the 2020 African Qualification Tournament in Rabat, Morocco.

Athlete	Event	Round of 16	Quarterfinal	Semifinal	Repechage	Final / BM	
Athlete	Event	Opposition Result	Opposition Result	Opposition Result	Opposition Result	Opposition Result	Rank
Cheick Sallah Cissé	Men's −80 kg	Mahboubi (MAR); L 11–21	Did not advance				
Seydou Gbané	Men's +80 kg	Issoufou (NIG); W 15–9	Georgievski (MKD); L 4–9	Did not advance	Alba (CUB); L 2–8	Did not advance	
Ruth Gbagbi	Women's −67 kg	Katoka (COD); W DSQ	Zhang My (CHN); W 21–9	Williams (GBR); L 18–24	—	Titoneli (BRA); W 12–8	3rd place, bronze medalist(s)
Aminata Traoré	Women's +67 kg	Lee D-b (KOR); L 13–17	Did not advance		Rodríguez (DOM); W 11–9	Laurin (FRA); L 8–17	5
