= 2019 World Taekwondo Championships – Men's featherweight =

Men's featherweight at the 2019 World Championships
- Venue: Manchester Arena
- Dates: 16–17 May 2019
- Competitors: 67 from 66 nations

Medalists
gold medal	Bradly Sinden	Great Britain
silver medal	Javier Pérez	Spain
bronze medal	Lee Dae-hoon	South Korea
bronze medal	Aleksey Denisenko	Russia

The men's featherweight is a competition featured at the 2019 World Taekwondo Championships, and was held at the Manchester Arena in Manchester, United Kingdom on 16 and 17 May. Featherweights were limited to a maximum of 68 kilograms in body mass.

== Results ==
Legend

- P — Won by punitive declaration
- W — Won by withdrawal

=== Finals ===
Quarterfinals		Semifinals		Final
Lee Dae-hoon (KOR)	24
Konstantinos Chamalidis (GRE)	4	Lee Dae-hoon (KOR)	23
Si Mohamed Ketbi (BEL)	16	Bradly Sinden (GBR)	24
Bradly Sinden (GBR)	30^{P}			Bradly Sinden (GBR)	24
Javier Pérez (ESP)	15			Javier Pérez (ESP)	21
Karol Robak (POL)	14	Javier Pérez (ESP)	12
Nedžad Husić (BIH)	6	Aleksey Denisenko (RUS)	6
Aleksey Denisenko (RUS)	14

=== Top half ===
==== Section 1 ====
Round of 128
Abdullahi Fuad Dahir (SOM)	0
Bir Bahadur Mahara (NEP)	24^{P}

Round of 64
Lee Dae-hoon (KOR)	25
Bir Bahadur Mahara (NEP)	5
Iker Casas (MEX)	24
Michele Ceccaroni (SMR)	0
Abdelrahman Wael (EGY)	23
Vincent Munyakazi (RWA)	3
Renato Pereira (POR)	11
Ismael Yacouba (NIG)	14

Round of 32
Lee Dae-hoon (KOR)	34
Iker Casas (MEX)	14
Abdelrahman Wael (EGY)	22
Ismael Yacouba (NIG)	20

Round of 16
Lee Dae-hoon (KOR)	13
Abdelrahman Wael (EGY)	5

==== Section 2 ====
Round of 128

Round of 64
Konstantinos Chamalidis (GRE)	23
Liao Wei-lin (TPE)	3
Edgaras Abromavičius (LTU)	14
Merab Shukakidze (GEO)	26
Nimrod Krivishkiy (ISR)	38
Lakchai Hauihongthong (THA)	21
Valentino Maglione (ITA)	3
Tom Afonczenko (AUS)	33

Round of 32
Konstantinos Chamalidis (GRE)	13
Merab Shukakidze (GEO)	10
Nimrod Krivishkiy (ISR)	17
Tom Afonczenko (AUS)	13

Round of 16
Konstantinos Chamalidis (GRE)	29
Nimrod Krivishkiy (ISR)	20

==== Section 3 ====
Round of 128

Round of 64
Si Mohamed Ketbi (BEL)	22^{W}
Szabolcs Simon (ROU)	1
Hasanein Khafaji (IRQ)	3
Petr Štefl (CZE)	19
Nursultan Mamayev (KAZ)	13
Zinedin Beqaj (MNE)	6
Otto Jørgensen (DEN)	10
Hervan Nkogho-Mengue (CAN)	18

Round of 32
Si Mohamed Ketbi (BEL)	37
Petr Štefl (CZE)	5
Nursultan Mamayev (KAZ)	12
Hervan Nkogho-Mengue (CAN)	9

Round of 16
Si Mohamed Ketbi (BEL)	12
Nursultan Mamayev (KAZ)	5

==== Section 4 ====
Round of 128

Round of 64
Fahd Zaouia (NED)	35
Rene Abou Halka (LBN)	9
Roslan Lbzo (JOR)	25
Arven Alcantara (PHI)	36
Ali Radwan (BLR)	15
Abdullah Sediqi (WT)	12
Donaldo Dizdari (ALB)	4
Bradly Sinden (GBR)	24

Round of 32
Fahd Zaouia (NED)	24
Arven Alcantara (PHI)	28
Ali Radwan (BLR)	1
Bradly Sinden (GBR)	25

Round of 16
Arven Alcantara (PHI)	34
Bradly Sinden (GBR)	55

=== Bottom half ===
==== Section 5 ====
Round of 128
Shum Shun Chit (HKG)	17
Nipesh Prakash (NZL)	37

Round of 64
Javier Pérez (ESP)	27
Nipesh Prakash (NZL)	2
Braulio León (PER)	25
Lý Hồng Phúc (VIE)	5
Hakan Reçber (TUR)	22
Dmytro Govorun (UKR)	2
David Paz (COL)	21
Luis Colon (PUR)	15

Round of 32
Javier Pérez (ESP)	25
Braulio León (PER)	4
Hakan Reçber (TUR)	18
David Paz (COL)	22

Round of 16
Javier Pérez (ESP)	19
David Paz (COL)	14

==== Section 6 ====
Round of 128

Round of 64
Karol Robak (POL)	20
Carlos Caicedo (ECU)	16
Juan Soto (CRC)	18
Faical Saidi (MAR)	23
Federico González (URU)	7
Jehudiel Kiki (BEN)	6
Brandon Sealy (JAM)	5
Edival Pontes (BRA)	30

Round of 32
Karol Robak (POL)	10
Faical Saidi (MAR)	9
Federico González (URU)	6
Edival Pontes (BRA)	15

Round of 16
Karol Robak (POL)	25
Edival Pontes (BRA)	24

==== Section 7 ====
Round of 128

Round of 64
Vladimir Dalakliev (BUL)	16
Nicolas Christoforides (CYP)	1
Masanojo Honma (JPN)	3
Nikola Vučković (SRB)	23
Mahammad Mammadov (AZE)	18
Nedžad Husić (BIH)	20
Ahmad Bahlool (PLE)	8
Ignacio Morales (CHI)	28

Round of 32
Vladimir Dalakliev (BUL)	16
Nikola Vučković (SRB)	16
Nedžad Husić (BIH)	25
Ignacio Morales (CHI)	18

Round of 16
Nikola Vučković (SRB)	38
Nedžad Husić (BIH)	40

==== Section 8 ====
Round of 128
Abdullah Hasan (KUW)	16
Qendrim Sejfijaj (KOS)	3

Round of 64
Carl Nickolas (USA)	13^{P}
Filip Švec (SVK)	3
Justin Choy (GUY)	2
Deni Andrun Razić (CRO)	23^{P}
Song Guodong (CHN)	9
Ali Alian (SWE)	7
Abdullah Hasan (KUW)	5
Aleksey Denisenko (RUS)	25

Round of 32
Carl Nickolas (USA)	25
Deni Andrun Razić (CRO)	21^{P}
Song Guodong (CHN)	11
Aleksey Denisenko (RUS)	19

Round of 16
Deni Andrun Razić (CRO)	19
Aleksey Denisenko (RUS)	21
