= 2021 African Taekwondo Championships =

Sport event

- Host city: Dakar
- Country: Senegal
- Dates: 5–6 June 2021

The 2021 African Taekwondo Championships was held in Dakar, Senegal on 5 and 6 June 2021.

== Results ==
=== Men ===
Event	Gold	Silver	Bronze
54 kg	Hamza El Hacham; Morocco	Omar Sharaky; Egypt	Ibrahima Joel Diallo; Ivory Coast
54 kg	Hamza El Hacham; Morocco	Omar Sharaky; Egypt	Mahamadou Amadou; Niger
58 kg	Mohamed Khalil Jendoubi; Tunisia	Omar Lakehal; Morocco	Casimir Betel; Chad
58 kg	Mohamed Khalil Jendoubi; Tunisia	Omar Lakehal; Morocco	Issa Diakité; Ivory Coast
63 kg	Fares Boujemai; Tunisia	Ahmed Nassar; Egypt	Abdelbasset Wasfi; Morocco
63 kg	Fares Boujemai; Tunisia	Ahmed Nassar; Egypt	Youssouf Simpara; Mali
68 kg	Abdelrahman Wael; Egypt	Aaron Kobenan; Ivory Coast	Ismael Yacouba; Niger
68 kg	Abdelrahman Wael; Egypt	Aaron Kobenan; Ivory Coast	Faical Saidi; Morocco
74 kg	Firas Katoussi; Tunisia	Abdelrahman El-Sayed; Egypt	Koffi Jean Mermoz Akue; Ivory Coast
74 kg	Firas Katoussi; Tunisia	Abdelrahman El-Sayed; Egypt	Amar Cisse Moussa; Gabon
80 kg	Seif Eissa; Egypt	Achraf Mahboubi; Morocco	Ababacar Sadikh Soumaré; Senegal
80 kg	Seif Eissa; Egypt	Achraf Mahboubi; Morocco	Faysal Sawadogo; Burkina Faso
87 kg	Cheick Sallah Cissé; Ivory Coast	Ahmad Rawy; Egypt	Soufiane Elasbi; Morocco
87 kg	Cheick Sallah Cissé; Ivory Coast	Ahmad Rawy; Egypt	Frederic Hongbe Adoua; Chad
+87 kg	Abdoul Razak Issoufou; Niger	Ayoub Bassel; Morocco	Seydou Gbané; Ivory Coast
+87 kg	Abdoul Razak Issoufou; Niger	Ayoub Bassel; Morocco	Anthony Obame; Gabon

=== Women ===
Event	Gold	Silver	Bronze
–46 kg	Shahd Samy Elhosseiny; Egypt	Soukaina Sahib; Morocco	Ranim Houimli; Tunisia
–46 kg	Shahd Samy Elhosseiny; Egypt	Soukaina Sahib; Morocco	Michelle Tau; Lesotho
–49 kg	Oumaima El-Bouchti; Morocco	Bouma Ferimata Coulibaly; Ivory Coast	Nour Abdelsalam; Egypt
–49 kg	Oumaima El-Bouchti; Morocco	Bouma Ferimata Coulibaly; Ivory Coast	Ikram Dhahri; Tunisia
–53 kg	Chaima Toumi; Tunisia	Mennatalla Medhat; Egypt	Chinazum Nwosu; Nigeria
–53 kg	Chaima Toumi; Tunisia	Mennatalla Medhat; Egypt	Balkissa Halidou Mossi; Niger
–57 kg	Tekiath Ben Yessouf; Niger	Nada Laaraj; Morocco	Mary Muriu; Kenya
–57 kg	Tekiath Ben Yessouf; Niger	Nada Laaraj; Morocco	Ashrakat Nabil Seddik; Egypt
–62 kg	Merieme Khoulal; Morocco	Koumba Nanah-Hélène Ibo; Ivory Coast	Rewan Refaei; Egypt
–62 kg	Merieme Khoulal; Morocco	Koumba Nanah-Hélène Ibo; Ivory Coast	Yacine Diaw; Senegal
–67 kg	Ruth Gbagbi; Ivory Coast	Elizabeth Anyanacho; Nigeria	Sanae Baiza; Morocco
–67 kg	Ruth Gbagbi; Ivory Coast	Elizabeth Anyanacho; Nigeria	Hedaya Malak; Egypt
–73 kg	Urgence Mouega; Gabon	Astan Katherine Feghe Bathily; Ivory Coast	Everlyn Aluoch Oloo; Kenya
–73 kg	Urgence Mouega; Gabon	Astan Katherine Feghe Bathily; Ivory Coast	Maisoun Farouk; Egypt
+73 kg	Aminata Traoré; Ivory Coast	Sabah Koutbi; Morocco	Toka Shaaban Sleman Hassan; Egypt
+73 kg	Aminata Traoré; Ivory Coast	Sabah Koutbi; Morocco	Faith Ogallo; Kenya

== Medal table ==
Rank	Nation	Gold	Silver	Bronze	Total
1	Tunisia (TUN)	4	0	2	6
2	Morocco (MAR)	3	6	4	13
3	Egypt (EGY)	3	5	6	14
4	Ivory Coast (CIV)	3	4	4	11
5	Niger (NIG)	2	0	3	5
6	Gabon (GAB)	1	0	2	3
7	Nigeria (NGR)	0	1	1	2
8	Kenya (KEN)	0	0	3	3
9	Chad (CHA)	0	0	2	2
9	Senegal (SEN)	0	0	2	2
11	Burkina Faso (BUR)	0	0	1	1
11	Lesotho (LES)	0	0	1	1
11	Mali (MLI)	0	0	1	1
Totals (13 entries)		16	16	32	64
