= 2017 World Taekwondo Championships – Women's lightweight =

Taekwondo competition

Women's lightweight at the 2017 World Championships
- Venue: Taekwondowon
- Dates: 30 June 2017
- Competitors: 49 from 49 nations

Medalists
gold medal	Ruth Gbagbi	Ivory Coast
silver medal	Kimia Alizadeh	Iran
bronze medal	Kim So-hee	South Korea
bronze medal	Tatiana Kuzmina	Russia

The women's lightweight is a competition featured at the 2017 World Taekwondo Championships, and was held at the Taekwondowon in Muju County, South Korea on June 30. Lightweights were limited to a maximum of 62 kilograms in body mass.

== Results ==
Legend

- DQ — Won by disqualification
- P — Won by punitive declaration
- R — Won by referee stop contest
- W — Won by withdrawal

=== Finals ===
Semifinals		Final
Ruth Gbagbi (CIV)	5^{W}
Kim So-hee (KOR)	0	Ruth Gbagbi (CIV)	19
Tatiana Kuzmina (RUS)	6	Kimia Alizadeh (IRI)	9
Kimia Alizadeh (IRI)	9

=== Top half ===
==== Section 1 ====
Round of 64
Lucero Gómez (COL)	9
Elin Johansson (SWE)	18
Indra Craen (BEL)	DQ
~~Malia Paseka (TGA)~~
Sonam Rawal (IND)	2
Melissa Oviedo (MEX)	12
Tracy Coleman (NZL)	1
Zhou Meiling (CHN)	31^{P}
Shahd Al-Tarman (JOR)	8
Mia Italiano (AUS)	6

Round of 32
İrem Yaman (TUR)	1
Elin Johansson (SWE)	2
Indra Craen (BEL)	16
Melissa Oviedo (MEX)	26
Rachelle Booth (GBR)	17
Zhou Meiling (CHN)	11
Shahd Al-Tarman (JOR)	5
Ruth Gbagbi (CIV)	23

Round of 16
Elin Johansson (SWE)	5
Melissa Oviedo (MEX)	4
Rachelle Booth (GBR)	6
Ruth Gbagbi (CIV)	15

Quarterfinals
Elin Johansson (SWE)	8
Ruth Gbagbi (CIV)	13

==== Section 2 ====
Round of 64
Yislena Vargas (CUB)	7
Ingibjörg Grétarsdóttir (ISL)	5
Adanys Cordero (VEN)	7^{R}
Vincy Lo (HKG)	5
Kasumi Hirabayashi (JPN)	3
Nađa Savković (SRB)	4
Gerda Gaižauskaitė (LTU)	0
Umida Abdullaeva (UZB)	6

Round of 32
Rabia Gülec (GER)	11
Yislena Vargas (CUB)	3
Adanys Cordero (VEN)	13
Amanda Bluford (USA)	15
Darya Yakovleva (UKR)	8
Nađa Savković (SRB)	6
Umida Abdullaeva (UZB)	4
Kim So-hee (KOR)	18

Round of 16
Rabia Gülec (GER)	6
Amanda Bluford (USA)	3
Darya Yakovleva (UKR)	2
Kim So-hee (KOR)	24

Quarterfinals
Rabia Gülec (GER)	2
Kim So-hee (KOR)	22

=== Bottom half ===
==== Section 3 ====
Round of 64
Ana Ciuchitu (MDA)	4
Tatiana Kuzmina (RUS)	6
Gulim Bibalayeva (KAZ)	DQ
~~Zariyah Ashby (TTO)~~
Lisa Zangarini (LUX)	5
Iveta Jiránková (CZE)	18
Hà Thị Nguyên (VIE)	27
Ndèye Coumba Diop (SEN)	1

Round of 32
Marta Calvo (ESP)	5
Tatiana Kuzmina (RUS)	6
Gulim Bibalayeva (KAZ)	14
Júlia Vasconcelos (BRA)	6
Rewan Refaei (EGY)	2
Iveta Jiránková (CZE)	2
Hà Thị Nguyên (VIE)	3
Magda Wiet-Hénin (FRA)	10

Round of 16
Tatiana Kuzmina (RUS)	13
Gulim Bibalayeva (KAZ)	11
Iveta Jiránková (CZE)	5
Magda Wiet-Hénin (FRA)	5

Quarterfinals
Tatiana Kuzmina (RUS)	3
Iveta Jiránková (CZE)	2

==== Section 4 ====
Round of 64
Sarah Tanios (LBN)	3
Soukayna El-Aouni (MAR)	25
Vasiliki Grammatikopoulou (GRE)	6
Tekiath Ben Yessouf (NIG)	17
Goundo Samaké (MLI)	22
Feng Xiao (MAC)	18
Fernanda Aguirre (CHI)	9
Kimia Alizadeh (IRI)	14

Round of 32
Daniela Rotolo (ITA)	5
Soukayna El-Aouni (MAR)	3
Tekiath Ben Yessouf (NIG)	14
Marija Štetić (CRO)	24
Lin Yi-ching (TPE)	21
Goundo Samaké (MLI)	7
Kimia Alizadeh (IRI)	36
Ashley Kraayeveld (CAN)	22

Round of 16
Daniela Rotolo (ITA)	7
Marija Štetić (CRO)	10
Lin Yi-ching (TPE)	14
Kimia Alizadeh (IRI)	16

Quarterfinals
Marija Štetić (CRO)	4
Kimia Alizadeh (IRI)	12
