= Tariku Girma =

Ethiopian taekwondo practitioner

Personal information
- Full name: Tariku Girma Demisu
- Born: 28 December 2001 (age 24)

Sport
- Country: Ethiopia
- Sport: Taekwondo
Medal record
Representing Ethiopia
African Games
Gold medal – first place	2019 Rabat	−63 kg

Tariku Girma Demisu (born 28 December 2001) is an Ethiopian taekwondo practitioner. He represented Ethiopia at the 2019 African Games held in Rabat, Morocco and he won the gold medal in the men's 63 kg event.

At the 2020 African Taekwondo Olympic Qualification Tournament held in Rabat, Morocco, he finished in third place in his event. He lost in the semi-finals against Abdelrahman Wael of Egypt.
