= Abdelrahman Darwish =

Egyptian taekwondo practitioner

Sport
- Country: Egypt
- Sport: Taekwondo
Medal record
Representing Egypt
African Games
Silver medal – second place	2019 Rabat	+87 kg
African Taekwondo Championships
Bronze medal – third place	2018 Agadir	87 kg

Abdelrahman Darwish is an Egyptian taekwondo practitioner.

In 2018, at the African Taekwondo Championships held in Agadir, Morocco, he won one of the bronze medals in the men's 87 kg event.

He represented Egypt at the 2019 African Games held in Rabat, Morocco and he won the silver medal in the men's +87 kg event.
