= 2017 World Taekwondo Championships – Men's featherweight =

Taekwondo competition

Men's featherweight at the 2017 World Championships
- Venue: Taekwondowon
- Dates: 26–27 June 2017
- Competitors: 91 from 91 nations

Medalists
gold medal	Lee Dae-hoon	South Korea
silver medal	Huang Yu-jen	Chinese Taipei
bronze medal	Vladimir Dalakliev	Bulgaria
bronze medal	Ahmad Abughaush	Jordan

The men's featherweight is a competition featured at the 2017 World Taekwondo Championships, and was held at the Taekwondowon in Muju County, South Korea on June 26 and June 27. Featherweights were limited to a maximum of 68 kilograms in body mass.

== Results ==
Legend

- DQ — Won by disqualification
- P — Won by punitive declaration
- R — Won by referee stop contest
- W — Won by withdrawal

=== Finals ===
Quarterfinals		Semifinals		Final
Lee Dae-hoon (KOR)	15
Abolfazl Yaghoubi (IRI)	11	Lee Dae-hoon (KOR)	23
Wang Jinyu (CHN)	3	Vladimir Dalakliev (BUL)	6
Vladimir Dalakliev (BUL)	5^{R}			Lee Dae-hoon (KOR)	26
Huang Yu-jen (TPE)	24			Huang Yu-jen (TPE)	8
Peter Longobardi-Radford (GBR)	10	Huang Yu-jen (TPE)	9
Viacheslav Minin (RUS)	10	Ahmad Abughaush (JOR)	4
Ahmad Abughaush (JOR)	15

=== Top half ===
==== Section 1 ====
Round of 128
Lakchai Hauihongthong (THA)	21^{P}
Tilak Bahadur Gurung (BHU)	4
Ilja Chemis (LAT)	2
Rohullah Nikpai (AFG)	22
Lý Hồng Phúc (VIE)	23
Ranjan Shrestha (NEP)	6

Round of 64
Lee Dae-hoon (KOR)	34^{P}
Lakchai Hauihongthong (THA)	10
Yerassyl Kaiyrbek (KAZ)	22^{P}
Samba Niang (MLI)	5
Ilan Braginski (ISR)	3
Rohullah Nikpai (AFG)	19^{P}
Lý Hồng Phúc (VIE)	0
Edival Pontes (BRA)	14^{W}

Round of 32
Lee Dae-hoon (KOR)	39
Yerassyl Kaiyrbek (KAZ)	27
Rohullah Nikpai (AFG)	20
Edival Pontes (BRA)	23

Round of 16
Lee Dae-hoon (KOR)	25
Edival Pontes (BRA)	7

==== Section 2 ====
Round of 128
~~Steven Tommy (PNG)~~
Hassan Shubbar (UAE)	DQ
Peken Logbo (CIV)	16
Musa Hassen (ETH)	17
Fermin Quesada (CUB)	18
Andrei Rotaru (ROU)	5
Abdalaziz Abdalla (SUD)	DQ
~~Jelaletdin Batyrow (TKM)~~

Round of 64
Javier Pérez (ESP)	27
Hassan Shubbar (UAE)	5
Musa Hassen (ETH)	DQ
~~Faisal Al-Rushaidi (QAT)~~
Sergey Vardazaryan (ARM)	24
Fermin Quesada (CUB)	15
Abdalaziz Abdalla (SUD)	5
Abolfazl Yaghoubi (IRI)	25

Round of 32
Javier Pérez (ESP)	18^{R}
Musa Hassen (ETH)	0
Sergey Vardazaryan (ARM)	4
Abolfazl Yaghoubi (IRI)	27

Round of 16
Javier Pérez (ESP)	21
Abolfazl Yaghoubi (IRI)	23

==== Section 3 ====
Round of 128
~~Mohammad Kheirallah (SYR)~~
Zukhriddin Khonimkulov (UZB)	DQ
Wang Jinyu (CHN)	12^{P}
Abdelrahman Wael (EGY)	22
Boris Ruiz (AND)	4
Chandan Lakra (IND)	11

Round of 64
Tom Afonczenko (AUS)	13
Zukhriddin Khonimkulov (UZB)	22
Petr Štefl (CZE)	8
Hervan Nkogho-Mengue (CAN)	11
Ignacio Morales (CHI)	17
Wang Jinyu (CHN)	17^{P}
Chandan Lakra (IND)	2
Si Mohamed Ketbi (BEL)	26

Round of 32
Zukhriddin Khonimkulov (UZB)	8
Hervan Nkogho-Mengue (CAN)	10
Wang Jinyu (CHN)	30^{P}
Si Mohamed Ketbi (BEL)	18

Round of 16
Hervan Nkogho-Mengue (CAN)	10
Wang Jinyu (CHN)	16

==== Section 4 ====
Round of 128
Victor Asp (NOR)	11
Christos Pilavakis (CYP)	5
Dmytro Karunyk (UKR)	18
Célestin Bibang (GAB)	9
Kwan Wai Lam (HKG)	DQ
~~Vusumuzi Ncube (ZIM)~~

Round of 64
Vladimir Dalakliev (BUL)	24
Victor Asp (NOR)	14
Dmytro Karunyk (UKR)	5
Konstantinos Chamalidis (GRE)	18
Federico González (URU)	15
Michele Ceccaroni (SMR)	3
Kwan Wai Lam (HKG)	4
Saúl Gutiérrez (MEX)	19

Round of 32
Vladimir Dalakliev (BUL)	5
Konstantinos Chamalidis (GRE)	3
Federico González (URU)	7
Saúl Gutiérrez (MEX)	19

Round of 16
Vladimir Dalakliev (BUL)	15
Saúl Gutiérrez (MEX)	11

=== Bottom half ===
==== Section 5 ====
Round of 128
~~Nelson Ekeaua (KIR)~~
Rayan Delbani (LBN)	DQ
~~James Pita Johnny (VAN)~~
Miguel Trejos (COL)	DQ
~~Valery Nyamsik (CMR)~~	DQ
~~Magnus Ellie (SLE)~~	DQ

Round of 64
Aykhan Taghizade (AZE)	22
Rayan Delbani (LBN)	11
Saud Al-Muwallad (KSA)	10
Ruddy Mateo (DOM)	9
Huang Yu-jen (TPE)	21
Miguel Trejos (COL)	7
Bye
Alexander Ortiz (PER)

Round of 32
Aykhan Taghizade (AZE)	11
Saud Al-Muwallad (KSA)	3
Huang Yu-jen (TPE)	23^{P}
Alexander Ortiz (PER)	5

Round of 16
Aykhan Taghizade (AZE)	5
Huang Yu-jen (TPE)	6

==== Section 6 ====
Round of 128
~~Luke Uhi (TGA)~~
Arven Alcantara (PHI)	DQ
Ismael Yacouba (NIG)	12
Mohamed Amine Mejri (TUN)	8
Isaac Anthony Jiggo (SSD)
Dinggo Ardian Prayogo (INA)	W
Rui Bragança (POR)	10
Ferhat Can Kavurat (TUR)	15

Round of 64
Edgar Contreras (VEN)	27
Arven Alcantara (PHI)	34
Ismael Yacouba (NIG)	10
Ivan Purešević (SRB)	15
Faical Saidi (MAR)	25
Dinggo Ardian Prayogo (INA)	15
Ferhat Can Kavurat (TUR)	11
Peter Longobardi-Radford (GBR)	18

Round of 32
Arven Alcantara (PHI)	15
Ivan Purešević (SRB)	8
Faical Saidi (MAR)	4
Peter Longobardi-Radford (GBR)	19

Round of 16
Arven Alcantara (PHI)	8
Peter Longobardi-Radford (GBR)	22

==== Section 7 ====
Round of 128
Newton Sythong (NZL)	3
Masanojo Honma (JPN)	24
Albert Millert (POL)	14
Rozaimi Rozali (MAS)	22
~~Koami Aziakonou (TOG)~~
Hasanein Khafaji (IRQ)	DQ
~~Dieu Toko (COD)~~
Joseph Phiri (MAW)	DQ

Round of 64
Viacheslav Minin (RUS)	17
Masanojo Honma (JPN)	5
Rozaimi Rozali (MAS)	37^{P}
Fahd Zaouia (NED)	25
Jacob Grace (USA)	24
Hasanein Khafaji (IRQ)	3
Joseph Phiri (MAW)	13
Balla Dièye (SEN)	34

Round of 32
Viacheslav Minin (RUS)	W
Rozaimi Rozali (MAS)
Jacob Grace (USA)	25
Balla Dièye (SEN)	18

Round of 16
Viacheslav Minin (RUS)	31
Jacob Grace (USA)	25

==== Section 8 ====
Round of 128
~~Shadman Sakif Islam (BAN)~~
Merab Shukakidze (GEO)	DQ
Santos Akhilele (NGR)	22
Phouthasone Thammavong (LAO)	11
Muhammad Iqbal (PAK)	14^{P}
Paul Ogwalo (UGA)	8

Round of 64
Claudio Treviso (ITA)	15
Merab Shukakidze (GEO)	18
Santos Akhilele (NGR)	14
Andrés Zelaya (GUA)	16
Pürevjavyn Temüüjin (MGL)	23^{P}
Conor Grassick (IRL)	13
Muhammad Iqbal (PAK)	5
Ahmad Abughaush (JOR)	23

Round of 32
Merab Shukakidze (GEO)	21
Andrés Zelaya (GUA)	14
Pürevjavyn Temüüjin (MGL)	8
Ahmad Abughaush (JOR)	39^{P}

Round of 16
Merab Shukakidze (GEO)	17
Ahmad Abughaush (JOR)	23
