= Moustapha Kama =

Senegalese taekwondo practitioner

Personal information
- Born: 28 January 1992 (age 34)

Sport
- Country: Senegal
- Sport: Taekwondo
Medal record
Representing Senegal
African Games
Silver medal – second place	2015 Brazzaville	54 kg
Bronze medal – third place	2019 Rabat	54 kg
African Taekwondo Championships
Silver medal – second place	2018 Agadir	54 kg
Bronze medal – third place	2014 Tunis	54 kg
Bronze medal – third place	2016 Port Said	54 kg
Islamic Solidarity Games
Bronze medal – third place	2017 Baku	54 kg

Moustapha Kama (born 28 January 1992) is a Senegalese taekwondo practitioner. He is a two-time medalist at the African Games and a bronze medalist at the Islamic Solidarity Games. He has also won medals at the African Taekwondo Championships.

At the 2018 African Taekwondo Championships held in Agadir, Morocco, he won the silver medal in the men's 54 kg event.

In 2019, he represented Senegal at the African Games held in Rabat, Morocco and he won one of the bronze medals in the men's 54 kg event. In 2020, he competed in the men's 58 kg event at the 2020 African Taekwondo Olympic Qualification Tournament in Rabat, Morocco without qualifying for the 2020 Summer Olympics in Tokyo, Japan.
