= Ikram Dhahri =

Tunisian taekwondo athlete

Personal information
- Nationality: Tunisian
- Born: 7 January 1997 (age 29)
Medal record
Women's taekwondo
Representing Tunisia
African Games
Gold medal – first place	2023 Accra	49kg
Bronze medal – third place	2019 Rabat	49kg
African Championships
Silver medal – second place	2018 Agadir	49 kg
Silver medal – second place	2023 Abidjan	49 kg
Bronze medal – third place	2016 Port Said	49 kg
Bronze medal – third place	2021 Dakar	49 kg

Ikram Dhahri (born 7 January 1997) is a Tunisian taekwondo practitioner. She won gold in the 49 kg category at the 2023 African Games.

== Career ==
She was a bronze medalist at the 2016 African Taekwondo Championships in Port Said. She was a silver medalist at the 2018 African Taekwondo Championships in Agadir. She was a bronze medalist at the 2019 African Games in Rabat.

She won a third medal at the African Taekwondo Championships when she won bronze at the 2021 African Taekwondo Championships in Dakar.

At the 2023 African Taekwondo Championships in Abidjan, she won the silver medal in the -49 kg category. She won bronze at the Spanish Open in 2023. She won the gold medal in the under 49 kg category at the 2023 African Games in Accra, beating Egypt's Jana Khattab in the final. She competed at the 2023 World Taekwondo Championships in Baku.

She reached the quarterfinals of the 2024 Paris Olympics on 7 August 2024.
