= Taekwondo at the 2017 Islamic Solidarity Games =

Taekwondo competition

- Venue: Baku Sports Hall
- Location: Baku, Azerbaijan
- Dates: 16–18 May

Taekwondo at the 2017 Islamic Solidarity Games was held in Baku Sports Hall, Baku, Azerbaijan from 16 May to 18 May 2017.

== Medal table ==
* Host nation (Azerbaijan)

Rank	Nation	Gold	Silver	Bronze	Total
1	Azerbaijan*	6	2	1	9
2	Turkey	5	3	3	11
3	Iran	3	5	4	12
4	Uzbekistan	2	2	3	7
5	Kazakhstan	0	2	1	3
6	Indonesia	0	1	2	3
6	Morocco	0	1	2	3
8	Jordan	0	0	7	7
9	Tunisia	0	0	3	3
10	Ivory Coast	0	0	2	2
10	Saudi Arabia	0	0	2	2
12	Senegal	0	0	1	1
12	Suriname	0	0	1	1
Totals (13 entries)		16	16	32	64

== Medalists ==
=== Men ===
Event	Gold	Silver	Bronze
Finweight −54 kg	Mehdi Eshaghi; Iran	Gashim Magomedov; Azerbaijan	Moustapha Kama; Senegal
Finweight −54 kg	Mehdi Eshaghi; Iran	Gashim Magomedov; Azerbaijan	Deniz Dağdelen; Turkey
Flyweight −58 kg	Niyaz Pulatov; Uzbekistan	Omar Lakehal; Morocco	Hedi Neffati; Tunisia
Flyweight −58 kg	Niyaz Pulatov; Uzbekistan	Omar Lakehal; Morocco	Hamad Al-Mabrouk; Saudi Arabia
Bantamweight −63 kg	Mehdi Yousefi; Iran	Alimzhan Serikbayev; Kazakhstan	Mahammad Mammadov; Azerbaijan
Bantamweight −63 kg	Mehdi Yousefi; Iran	Alimzhan Serikbayev; Kazakhstan	Mohammad Assfour; Jordan
Featherweight −68 kg	Aykhan Taghizade; Azerbaijan	Hossein Ehsani; Iran	Saud Al-Muwallad; Saudi Arabia
Featherweight −68 kg	Aykhan Taghizade; Azerbaijan	Hossein Ehsani; Iran	Dinggo Ardian Prayogo; Indonesia
Lightweight −74 kg	Nikita Rafalovich; Uzbekistan	Ahmad Khosrofar; Iran	Anas Al-Adarbi; Jordan
Lightweight −74 kg	Nikita Rafalovich; Uzbekistan	Ahmad Khosrofar; Iran	Tosh van Dijk; Suriname
Welterweight −80 kg	Milad Beigi; Azerbaijan	Yunus Sarı; Turkey	Saleh El-Sharabaty; Jordan
Welterweight −80 kg	Milad Beigi; Azerbaijan	Yunus Sarı; Turkey	Maksim Rafalovich; Uzbekistan
Middleweight −87 kg	Ramin Azizov; Azerbaijan	Ahmad Mohammadi; Iran	Serdar Yüksel; Turkey
Middleweight −87 kg	Ramin Azizov; Azerbaijan	Ahmad Mohammadi; Iran	Seydou Gbané; Ivory Coast
Heavyweight +87 kg	Radik Isayev; Azerbaijan	Dmitriy Shokin; Uzbekistan	Hamza Kattan; Jordan
Heavyweight +87 kg	Radik Isayev; Azerbaijan	Dmitriy Shokin; Uzbekistan	Hossein Ghorbanzadeh; Iran

=== Women ===
Event	Gold	Silver	Bronze
Finweight −46 kg	Rukiye Yıldırım; Turkey	Dhean Titania Fajrin; Indonesia	Fadia Farhani; Tunisia
Finweight −46 kg	Rukiye Yıldırım; Turkey	Dhean Titania Fajrin; Indonesia	Fatemeh Maddahi; Iran
Flyweight −49 kg	Patimat Abakarova; Azerbaijan	Ainur Yesbergenova; Kazakhstan	Soudabeh Poursadeghi; Iran
Flyweight −49 kg	Patimat Abakarova; Azerbaijan	Ainur Yesbergenova; Kazakhstan	İpek Çidem; Turkey
Bantamweight −53 kg	Nahid Kiani; Iran	Zeliha Ağrıs; Turkey	Rahma Ben Ali; Tunisia
Bantamweight −53 kg	Nahid Kiani; Iran	Zeliha Ağrıs; Turkey	Mariska Halinda; Indonesia
Featherweight −57 kg	Yaprak Eriş; Azerbaijan	Dürdane Altunel; Turkey	Nada Laaraj; Morocco
Featherweight −57 kg	Yaprak Eriş; Azerbaijan	Dürdane Altunel; Turkey	Tayyebeh Parsa; Iran
Lightweight −62 kg	İrem Yaman; Turkey	Umida Abdullaeva; Uzbekistan	Shahd Al-Tarman; Jordan
Lightweight −62 kg	İrem Yaman; Turkey	Umida Abdullaeva; Uzbekistan	Soukayna El-Aouni; Morocco
Welterweight −67 kg	Nur Tatar; Turkey	Farida Azizova; Azerbaijan	Julyana Al-Sadeq; Jordan
Welterweight −67 kg	Nur Tatar; Turkey	Farida Azizova; Azerbaijan	Nigora Tursunkulova; Uzbekistan
Middleweight −73 kg	Sude Bulut; Turkey	Melika Mirhosseini; Iran	Waad Al-Tarman; Jordan
Middleweight −73 kg	Sude Bulut; Turkey	Melika Mirhosseini; Iran	Cansel Deniz; Kazakhstan
Heavyweight +73 kg	Nafia Kuş; Turkey	Akram Khodabandeh; Iran	Aminata Traoré; Ivory Coast
Heavyweight +73 kg	Nafia Kuş; Turkey	Akram Khodabandeh; Iran	Svetlana Osipova; Uzbekistan
