= Soukaina Sahib =

Moroccan taekwondo practitioner

Personal information
- Born: 1 April 1995 (age 31)

Sport
- Country: Morocco
- Sport: Taekwondo
- Weight class: 46 kg
Medal record
Representing Morocco
African Games
Gold medal – first place	2019 Rabat	46 kg
Silver medal – second place	2023 Accra	46 kg
African Taekwondo Championships
Gold medal – first place	2022 Kigali	46 kg
Gold medal – first place	2018 Agadir	46 kg
Silver medal – second place	2021 Dakar	46 kg
Islamic Solidarity Games
Gold medal – first place	2021 Konya	46 kg

Soukaina Sahib (born 1 April 1995) is a Moroccan taekwondo practitioner. She won the gold medal in the women's 46 kg event at the 2021 Islamic Solidarity Games held in Konya, Turkey. She represented Morocco at the 2019 African Games held in Rabat, Morocco and she won the gold medal in the women's 46 kg event.

At the 2018 African Taekwondo Championships held in Agadir, Morocco, she won the gold medal in the women's 46 kg event.
