= Bouma Coulibaly =

Ivorian taekwondo practitioner

Bouma Ferimata Coulibaly
Personal information
- Born: 9 November 1995 (age 30)

Sport
- Country: Ivory Coast
- Sport: Taekwondo
Medal record
African Games
Gold medal – first place	2019 Rabat	49 kg
Silver medal – second place	2023 Accra	53 kg
Bronze medal – third place	2015 Brazzaville	46 kg
African Taekwondo Championships
Silver medal – second place	2016 Port Said	46 kg
Silver medal – second place	2018 Agadir	46 kg
Silver medal – second place	2021 Dakar	49 kg
Bronze medal – third place	2014 Tunis	46 kg

Bouma Ferimata Coulibaly (born 9 November 1995) is an Ivorian taekwondo practitioner. At the African Taekwondo Championships she won four medals: the silver medal in 2016, 2018 and 2021 and a bronze medal in 2014.

In 2019, she represented Ivory Coast at the African Games in Rabat, Morocco and she won the gold medal in the 49 kg event. Four year earlier, in 2015, she also competed at the African Games and she won one of the bronze medals in the 46 kg event.

At the 2021 African Taekwondo Championships held in Dakar, Senegal, she won the silver medal in the women's 49 kg event.
