= Omar Lakehal =

Moroccan taekwondo practitioner

Personal information
- Born: 5 June 1999 (age 27)

Sport
- Country: Morocco
- Sport: Taekwondo
Medal record
Representing Morocco
African Games
Gold medal – first place	2019 Rabat	58 kg
African Championships
Silver medal – second place	2021 Dakar	58 kg
Bronze medal – third place	2018 Agadir	58 kg
Islamic Solidarity Games
Silver medal – second place	2017 Baku	58 kg
Mediterranean Games
Silver medal – second place	2022 Oran	58 kg

Omar Lakehal (born 5 June 1999) is a Moroccan taekwondo practitioner. He is a gold medalist at the African Games and a silver medalist at the Islamic Solidarity Games and the Mediterranean Games.

== Career ==
In 2017, at the Islamic Solidarity Games held in Baku, Azerbaijan, he won the silver medal in the men's 58 kg event. At the 2018 African Taekwondo Championships held in Agadir, Morocco, he won one of the bronze medals in the men's 58 kg event.

In 2019, he represented Morocco at the African Games held in Rabat, Morocco and he won the gold medal in the men's 58 kg event. In 2020, he competed in the men's 58 kg event at the African Olympic Qualification Tournament in Rabat, Morocco without qualifying for the 2020 Summer Olympics in Tokyo, Japan.

At the 2021 African Taekwondo Championships held in Dakar, Senegal, he won the silver medal in the men's 58 kg event.

He won the silver medal in the men's 58 kg event at the 2022 Mediterranean Games held in Oran, Algeria.

== Achievements ==
Year	Tournament	Place	Weight class
2017	Islamic Solidarity Games	2nd	58 kg
2018	African Championships	3rd	58 kg
2019	African Games	1st	58 kg
2021	African Championships	2nd	58 kg
