= Rewan Refaei =

Egyptian taekwondo practitioner

Personal information
- Born: 1 September 1996 (age 29)

Sport
- Country: Egypt
- Sport: Taekwondo
Medal record
Representing Egypt
African Taekwondo Championships
Gold medal – first place	2018 Agadir	-62 kg
Bronze medal – third place	2021 Dakar	-62 kg
African Games
Silver medal – second place	2015 Brazzaville	-62 kg
Silver medal – second place	2019 Rabat	-62 kg

Rewan Refaei (born 1 September 1996) is an Egyptian taekwondo practitioner. She won the gold medal at the 2018 African Taekwondo Championships held in Agadir, Morocco in the women's -62 kg event.

She also competed in the women's lightweight event at the 2015 World Taekwondo Championships and at the 2017 World Taekwondo Championships and at the 2019 World Taekwondo Championships.

At the 2019 African Games held in Rabat, Morocco, she won the silver medal in the women's -62 kg event.
