= Niger at the 2019 African Games =

- Flag of Niger
- IOC code: NIG
- NOC: Nigerien Olympic and National Sports Committee

in Rabat, Morocco 19 August 2019 – 31 August 2019
- Competitors: 43 (28 men and 15 women) in 10 sports
- Medals Ranked 21st: Gold 2 Silver 0 Bronze 1 Total 3

African Games appearances
- 1965; 1973; 1978–1995; 1999; 2003; 2007; 2011; 2015; 2019; 2023

Niger competed at the 2019 African Games held from 19 to 31 August 2019 in Rabat, Morocco. In total, 43 athletes represented Niger in 10 sports and won two gold medals and one bronze medal. All medals were won in Taekwondo and the country finished 21st in the medal table.

== Medal summary ==
=== Medal table ===
Medal	Name	Sport	Event	Date
Gold	Ismael Yacouba Garba	Taekwondo	Men's -68 kg	23 August
Gold	Abdoul Razak Issoufou	Taekwondo	Men's +87 kg	21 August
Bronze	Tekiath Ben Yessouf	Taekwondo	Women's -57 kg	23 August

Medals by sport
Sport	1st place, gold medalist(s)	2nd place, silver medalist(s)	3rd place, bronze medalist(s)	Total
Taekwondo	2	0	1	3
Total	2	0	1	3

== 3x3 basketball ==
Niger competed in 3x3 basketball in both the men's tournament and women's tournament. Both the men's team and women's team lost all their matches.

== Archery ==
Ibrahim Hamzata Mahaman Salissou competed in the men's individual recurve event.

Adamou Saley was also scheduled to compete in the same event but he did not compete.

== Athletics ==
Aminatou Seyni competed in the women's 100 metres event and she reached the semifinals. She also finished in 4th place in the final of the women's 200 metres event.

Moussa Zaroumey competed in the men's 400 metres event and he finished in 29th place in the heats.

Mariama Mamoudou Ittatou competed in the women's 400 metres event and she finished in 20th place in the heats.

== Boxing ==
Sahabi Gado Moussa, Amadou Hassane Abdoul Madjid, Harouna Nomaou Maman Sani, Sahabi Gado Aboubacar and Kimba Issaka Abdoul Kader represented Niger in boxing.

== Judo ==
Six athletes represented Niger in judo.

== Karate ==
Issoufou Labo Adamou, Aboubacar A Tinni Amadou and Goumbi Kadade Mouniratou represented Niger in karate.

== Swimming ==
Seydou Lancina Alassane, Mouctar Mamoudou Albachir and Moussa Mahamane Roukaya competed in swimming.

Alassane competed in the men's 50 metre backstroke and men's 50 metre freestyle events.

Albachir competed in the men's 100 metre freestyle and men's 50 metre butterfly events.

Roukaya competed in the women's 50 metre freestyle and women's 100 metre freestyle events.

== Taekwondo ==
Niger competed in Taekwondo. Ismael Yacouba Garba won the gold medal in the men's -68 kg event.

Abdoul Razak Issoufou won the gold medal in the men's +87 kg event.

Tekiath Ben Yessouf won the bronze medal in the women's -57 kg event.

== Table tennis ==
Bello Fatimo was scheduled to compete in the men's singles event but he did not compete.

== Volleyball ==
Niger competed in the women's beach volleyball tournament and finished in 12th place.
