= Taekwondo at the 2023 African Games =

- Venue: Ga-Mashiae Hall
- Location: Accra, Ghana
- Dates: 17–22 March 2024

Taekwondo events at the 2023 African Games was held from 17 to 22 March 2024 at the Ga-Mashiae Hall in Accra, Ghana.

== Medalists ==
=== Kyorugi ===
==== Men ====
Event	Gold	Silver	Bronze
−54 kg	Moatazbellah Assem Atta Aboserea; Egypt	Amadou Toudiani Maharana; Niger	Ibrahim Diomandé; Ivory Coast
−54 kg	Moatazbellah Assem Atta Aboserea; Egypt	Amadou Toudiani Maharana; Niger	Siriman Ballo; Mali
−58 kg	Nouridine Issaka; Niger	Issa Diakité; Ivory Coast	Youssouf Simpara; Mali
−58 kg	Nouridine Issaka; Niger	Issa Diakité; Ivory Coast	Casimir Betel; Chad
–63 kg	Mohamed Khalil Jendoubi; Tunisia	Bocar Diop; Senegal	Maman Mansour Chipkaou; Niger
–63 kg	Mohamed Khalil Jendoubi; Tunisia	Bocar Diop; Senegal	Ben Younouss Konaté; Ivory Coast
–68 kg	Mouhamadou Mansour Lo; Senegal	Aaron Kobenan; Ivory Coast	Ibrahim Maïga; Burkina Faso
–68 kg	Mouhamadou Mansour Lo; Senegal	Aaron Kobenan; Ivory Coast	Ahmed Nassar; Egypt
–74 kg	Aboubacar Mangue Gaya; Niger	Rami Hussein Sherif Eissa; Egypt	Jean Kouamé; Ivory Coast
–74 kg	Aboubacar Mangue Gaya; Niger	Rami Hussein Sherif Eissa; Egypt	Hani Tebib; Algeria
–80 kg	Firas Katoussi; Tunisia	Seif Eissa; Egypt	Faysal Sawadogo; Burkina Faso
–80 kg	Firas Katoussi; Tunisia	Seif Eissa; Egypt	Ismaël Coulibaly; Mali
–87 kg	Ahmad Saied Aly Rawy Mohamed; Egypt	Moataz Ifaoui; Tunisia	Anicet Kassi; Ivory Coast
–87 kg	Ahmad Saied Aly Rawy Mohamed; Egypt	Moataz Ifaoui; Tunisia	Soufiane Elasbi; Morocco
+87 kg	Abdoul Razak Issoufou; Niger	Abdallah Essam Mohyeldien Hassan; Egypt	Anthony Obame; Gabon
+87 kg	Abdoul Razak Issoufou; Niger	Abdallah Essam Mohyeldien Hassan; Egypt	Ayoub Bassel; Morocco

==== Women ====
Event	Gold	Silver	Bronze
−46 kg	Zaraou Abdou Bilane; Niger	Soukaina Sahib; Morocco	Michelle Tau; Lesotho
−46 kg	Zaraou Abdou Bilane; Niger	Soukaina Sahib; Morocco	Ndeye Ngoné; Senegal
–49 kg	Ikram Dhahri; Tunisia	Janna Mohamed Kamal Ali Khattab; Egypt	Karabo Kula; Botswana
–49 kg	Ikram Dhahri; Tunisia	Janna Mohamed Kamal Ali Khattab; Egypt	Nabintou Koné; Ivory Coast
–53 kg	Ouhoud Ben Aoun; Tunisia	Bouma Coulibaly; Ivory Coast	Oumaima El Bouchti; Morocco
–53 kg	Ouhoud Ben Aoun; Tunisia	Bouma Coulibaly; Ivory Coast	Chinazum Nwosu; Nigeria
–57 kg	Chaima Toumi; Tunisia	Mariama Cissé; Ivory Coast	Yacine Diaw; Senegal
–57 kg	Chaima Toumi; Tunisia	Mariama Cissé; Ivory Coast	Maïmouna Konaté; Mali
–62 kg	Wafa Masghouni; Tunisia	Koumba Ibo; Ivory Coast	Merieme Khoulal; Morocco
–62 kg	Wafa Masghouni; Tunisia	Koumba Ibo; Ivory Coast	Nadine Amr Abdelhady Zaghloul Mahmoud; Egypt
–67 kg	Elizabeth Anyanacho; Nigeria	Aya Mohamed Mahmoud Mohamed Shehata; Egypt	Safia Salih; Morocco
–67 kg	Elizabeth Anyanacho; Nigeria	Aya Mohamed Mahmoud Mohamed Shehata; Egypt	Fanta Traoré; Mali
–73 kg	Omayma Boumh; Morocco	Urgence Mouega; Gabon	Jully Musangi; Kenya
–73 kg	Omayma Boumh; Morocco	Urgence Mouega; Gabon	Abenan Dangnide; Ivory Coast
+73 kg	Fatima-Ezzahra Aboufaras; Morocco	Astan Bathily; Ivory Coast	Faith Ogallo; Kenya
+73 kg	Fatima-Ezzahra Aboufaras; Morocco	Astan Bathily; Ivory Coast	Toka Shaaban; Egypt

==== Mixed ====
Event	Gold	Silver	Bronze
Team	Morocco; Ayoub Bassel; Omayma Boumh; Oumaima El-Bouchti; Soufiane Elasbi; Merieme Khoulal; Haitam Zarhouti	Egypt; Ahmad Rawy; Aya Shehata; Janna Khattab; Moatazbellah Assem Atta Aboserea; Nadine Amr; Rami Eissa	Nigeria; Elizabeth Anyanacho; Ifeoluwa Ajayi; Peter Itiku; Paul Kolade; Chinazum Nwosu; Chidimma Okoko

=== Poomsae ===
==== Recognized ====
Event	Gold	Silver	Bronze
Men's Under 30	Adama Ndiaye; Senegal	Chahine Abdesabour Saker; Algeria	Adamou Ahmadou Boubacar; Niger
Men's Under 30	Adama Ndiaye; Senegal	Chahine Abdesabour Saker; Algeria	Usman Harun; Nigeria
Men's Under 40	Sheldon Yan Too Sang; Mauritius	Nassir Merdaci; Algeria	Gerald Sarfo; Ghana
Men's Under 40	Sheldon Yan Too Sang; Mauritius	Nassir Merdaci; Algeria	Assoumane Moussa Issahak; Niger
Men's team Under 30	Egypt	Tunisia	Senegal
Women's Under 30	Imen Akermi; Tunisia	Yaye Aïta Ndiaye; Senegal	Salma Dabbur; Egypt
Women's Under 30	Imen Akermi; Tunisia	Yaye Aïta Ndiaye; Senegal	Mary Muriu; Kenya
Women's Under 40	Yassmin Zekri; Tunisia	Josephine Esuku; Nigeria	Milka Akinyi; Kenya
Women's Under 40	Yassmin Zekri; Tunisia	Josephine Esuku; Nigeria	Zeinabou Sompa Ouaba; Niger
Women's team Under 30	Tunisia	Egypt	Ivory Coast

==== Freestyle ====
Event	Gold	Silver	Bronze
Men's Over 17	Ahmed Hussein Mokhtar Aboushady; Egypt	Kelvin Amuzu; Ghana	Habibou Diallo; Senegal
Men's Over 17	Ahmed Hussein Mokhtar Aboushady; Egypt	Kelvin Amuzu; Ghana	Foued Ben El Derouich; Tunisia
Women's Over 17	Ganatalla Hamed Aly Elkotb; Egypt	Erica Tuagbor; Ghana	Josephine Ineme Esuku; Nigeria
Women's Over 17	Ganatalla Hamed Aly Elkotb; Egypt	Erica Tuagbor; Ghana	Gado Aichatou Djibo; Niger

== Medal table ==
* Host nation (Ghana)

Rank	Nation	Gold	Silver	Bronze	Total
1	Tunisia (TUN)	9	2	1	12
2	Egypt (EGY)	5	7	4	16
3	Niger (NIG)	4	1	5	10
4	Morocco (MAR)	3	1	5	9
5	Senegal (SEN)	2	2	4	8
6	Nigeria (NGR)	1	1	4	6
7	Mauritius (MRI)	1	0	0	1
8	Ivory Coast (CIV)	0	6	7	13
9	Algeria (ALG)	0	2	1	3
9	Ghana (GHA)*	0	2	1	3
11	Gabon (GAB)	0	1	1	2
12	Mali (MLI)	0	0	5	5
13	Kenya (KEN)	0	0	4	4
14	Burkina Faso (BUR)	0	0	2	2
15	Botswana (BOT)	0	0	1	1
15	Chad (CHA)	0	0	1	1
15	Lesotho (LES)	0	0	1	1
Totals (17 entries)		25	25	47	97
