= Casimir Betel =

Chadian taekwondo practitioner

Personal information
- Nationality: Chadian
- Born: 20 August 1997 (age 28)

Sport
- Sport: Taekwondo
- Event: 58 kg
Medal record
Men's taekwondo
Representing Chad
African Games
Bronze medal – third place	2019 Rabat	–58 kg
Bronze medal – third place	2023 Accra	–58 kg
African Championships
Bronze medal – third place	2021 Dakar	–58 kg

Casimir Betel (born 20 August 1997) is a Chadian taekwondo practitioner. He won a bronze medal in the 2019 African Games competing in the men's –58 kg category.
