= Nour Abdelsalam =

Egyptian taekwondo practitioner

Personal information
- Born: 29 March 1993 (age 33)

Sport
- Country: Egypt
- Sport: Taekwondo
- Weight class: 49 kg
Medal record
Women's taekwondo
Representing Egypt
African Championships
Gold medal – first place	2014 Tunis	-49 kg
Gold medal – first place	2016 Port Said	-49 kg
Gold medal – first place	2018 Agadir	-49 kg
Bronze medal – third place	2021 Dakar	-49 kg
African Games
Gold medal – first place	2015 Brazzaville	-49 kg
Silver medal – second place	2019 Rabat	-49 kg
Mediterranean Games
Silver medal – second place	2013 Mersin	-49 kg
Islamic Solidarity Games
Gold medal – first place	2013 Palembang	-49 kg
Military World Games
Silver medal – second place	2019 Wuhan	-49 kg

Nour Abdelsalam (born 29 March 1993) is an Egyptian taekwondo practitioner. She is a gold medalist in the women's 49 kg event at the Islamic Solidarity Games, the African Games and several editions of the African Taekwondo Championships. She also represented Egypt at the 2020 Summer Olympics in Tokyo, Japan.

== Career ==
Abdelsalam competed in the girls' 49 kg event at the 2010 Summer Youth Olympics held in Singapore. She was eliminated in her first match by Melanie Phan who went on to win one of the bronze medals. The following year, she competed in the women's 49 kg event at the 2011 World Taekwondo Olympic Qualification Tournament held in Baku, Azerbaijan where she was eliminated in her second match by Carolena Carstens of Panama. In 2013, she won the silver medal in the women's 49 kg event at the Mediterranean Games held in Mersin, Turkey. In the same year, at the 2013 Islamic Solidarity Games held in Palembang, Indonesia, she won the gold medal in the women's 49 kg event.

In 2018, Abdelsalam won the gold medal in the women's 49 kg event at the African Taekwondo Championships in Agadir, Morocco.

Abdelsalam represented Egypt at the 2019 African Games in Rabat, Morocco and she won the silver medal in the 49 kg event. She also represented Egypt at the 2019 Military World Games in Wuhan, China and she won the silver medal in the 49 kg event.

At the 2020 African Taekwondo Olympic Qualification Tournament held in Rabat, Morocco, she qualified to compete at the 2020 Summer Olympics in Tokyo, Japan.

At the 2021 African Taekwondo Championships held in Dakar, Senegal, she won one of the bronze medals in the women's 49 kg event. A few months later, she competed in the women's 49 kg event at the 2020 Summer Olympics in Tokyo, Japan where she was eliminated in her first match by Rukiye Yıldırım of Turkey.

== Achievements ==
Year	Tournament	Place	Weight class
2013	Mediterranean Games	2nd	49 kg
2013	Islamic Solidarity Games	1st	49 kg
2014	African Championships	1st	49 kg
2015	African Games	1st	49 kg
2016	African Championships	1st	49 kg
2018	African Championships	1st	49 kg
2019	African Games	2nd	49 kg
2019	Military World Games	2nd	49 kg
2021	African Championships	3rd	49 kg
