= Taekwondo at the 2018 Mediterranean Games – Men's 68 kg =

Taekwondo competition

Taekwondo – Men's 68 kg at the 2018 Mediterranean Games
- Venue: Salou Pavilion
- Date: 30 June
- Competitors: 16 from 16 nations

Medalists
gold medal	Javier Pérez Polo	Spain
silver medal	Konstantinos Chamalidis	Greece
bronze medal	Davide Spinosa	Italy
bronze medal	Hakan Reçber	Turkey

The men's 68 kg competition of the taekwondo events at the 2018 Mediterranean Games took place on the 30 of June at the Salou Pavilion.

== Schedule ==
All times are Central European Summer Time (UTC+2).

Date	Time	Round
June 30, 2018	10:00	Preliminaries
June 30, 2018	16:30	Finals

== Results ==
Legend

- PTG — Won by Points Gap
- SUP — Won by superiority
- OT — Won on over time (Golden Point)
- DQ — Won by disqualification
- PUN — Won by punitive declaration
- WD — Won by withdrawal

=== Main bracket ===
Preliminary round
1	Javier Pérez Polo (ESP)	25
Nuno Costa (POR)	13
8	Ioannis Pilavakis (CYP)	18
9	Abdelrahman Abow (EGY)	30
5	Nikola Vučković (SRB)	4
12	Davide Spinosa (ITA)	5
4	Saiffedine Trabelsi (TUN)	6
13	Abdulmalik Youssef Alarebi (LBA)	5
3	Konstantinos Chamalidis (GRE)	24
14	Juirdo Cani (ALB)	16
6	Jure Pantar (SLO)	26
11	Nedžad Husić (BIH)	24
7	Dylan Chellamootoo (FRA)	23 (PTG)
10	Michele Ceccaroni (SMR)	3
2	Hakan Reçber (TUR)	29 (PTG)
15	Qendrim Sejfijaj (KOS)	6

Quarter-finals
1	Javier Pérez Polo (ESP)	28 (PTG)
9	Abdelrahman Abow (EGY)	8
12	Davide Spinosa (ITA)	11
4	Saiffedine Trabelsi (TUN)	10
3	Konstantinos Chamalidis (GRE)	19
6	Jure Pantar (SLO)	7
7	Dylan Chellamootoo (FRA)	21
2	Hakan Reçber (TUR)	22

Semi-finals
1	Javier Pérez Polo (ESP)	29 (PTG)
12	Davide Spinosa (ITA)	4
3	Konstantinos Chamalidis (GRE)	12
2	Hakan Reçber (TUR)	9

Gold medal match
1	Javier Pérez Polo (ESP)	17
3	Konstantinos Chamalidis (GRE)	3
