= Tekiath Ben Yessouf =

Nigerien taekwondo practitioner

Personal information
- Nicknames: Teki, Kiki
- Born: 13 September 1991 (age 34) Niamey, Niger
- Occupation: Police officer

Sport
- Country: Niger
- Sport: Taekwondo
- Weight class: Featherweight
- Club: (Germany) BSV Friedrichshafen
Medal record
Representing Niger
African Games
| Bronze medal – third place | 2019 Rabat | 57 kg |
African Championships
| Gold medal – first place | 2021 Dakar | 57 kg |
| Silver medal – second place | 2018 Agadir | 57 kg |

Tekiath Ben Yessouf (born 13 September 1991) is a Nigerien taekwondo competitor. She represented Niger at the 2020 Summer Olympics held in Tokyo, Japan.

== Career ==
Ben Yessouf competed in the women's lightweight event at the 2017 World Taekwondo Championships held in Muju, South Korea. She was eliminated in her second match. At the 2018 African Taekwondo Championships held in Agadir, Morocco, she won the silver medal in the women's 57 kg event.

In 2019, Ben Yessouf competed in the women's featherweight event at the 2019 World Taekwondo Championships without winning a medal. In that same year, she also represented Niger at the 2019 African Games held in Rabat, Morocco and she won one of the bronze medals in the women's 57 kg event. In February 2020, she qualified at the 2020 African Taekwondo Olympic Qualification Tournament to compete at the 2020 Summer Olympics in Tokyo, Japan.

At the 2021 African Taekwondo Championships held in Dakar, Senegal, she won the gold medal in the women's 57 kg event. A few months later, she lost her bronze medal match in the women's 57 kg event at the 2020 Summer Olympics held in Tokyo, Japan.

== Achievements ==
| Year | Tournament | Place | Weight class |
|---|---|---|---|
| 2018 | African Taekwondo Championships | 2nd | −57 kg |
| 2019 | African Games | 3rd | −57 kg |
| 2021 | African Taekwondo Championships | 1st | −57 kg |
