= Taekwondo at the 2019 African Games =

- Venue: Prince Moulay Abdallah Sports Complex
- Location: Rabat, Morocco
- Dates: 21–23 August
- Competitors: 227 from 38 nations

Taekwondo at the 2019 African Games was held from 21 to 23 August 2019 in Rabat, Morocco.

The event served as a qualifier for the 2020 Summer Olympics in Tokyo, Japan.

== Participating nations ==
| NOC | Men | | | | | | | | Women | | | | | | | | Total |
| NOC | 54 kg | 58 kg | 63 kg | 68 kg | 74 kg | 80 kg | 87 kg | +87 kg | 46 kg | 49 kg | 53 kg | 57 kg | 62 kg | 67 kg | 73 kg | +73 kg | Total |
|---|---|---|---|---|---|---|---|---|---|---|---|---|---|---|---|---|---|
| Algeria | | X | | X | X | X | | | | X | | X | X | X | X | X | 10 |
| Benin | | | | X | | | | | | | | | | | | | 1 |
| Botswana | | | | X | X | | | | X | | | | | | | | 3 |
| Burkina Faso | | | X | | | X | X | X | | X | | | | | | | 5 |
| Cameroon | | X | X | X | | X | | | | | | | | | | | 4 |
| Cape Verde | | X | X | X | | | | | | X | | | | | | | 4 |
| Central African Republic | | | | | X | | X | | X | | | | | | | | 3 |
| Chad | X | X | X | X | | | X | | | X | | X | X | | | X | 9 |
| Republic of the Congo | | X | X | | | | | | | | | | | | | X | 3 |
| Democratic Republic of the Congo | X | X | X | X | X | X | X | | X | | X | X | X | | X | | 12 |
| Djibouti | X | X | | | | | | | | | | | | | | | 2 |
| Egypt | X | | X | X | X | X | X | X | X | X | X | X | X | X | X | X | 15 |
| Equatorial Guinea | | | | X | | | | | | | | | | | | X | 2 |
| Eswatini | | X | X | | | | | | | | | | | | | | 2 |
| Ethiopia | X | X | X | X | X | | | | X | X | X | | X | | | | 9 |
| Gabon | | | | X | X | | | X | X | | | | | X | | | 5 |
| Ghana | | X | X | X | | | | | X | X | | | | | | | 5 |
| Guinea | | | X | | | | | | | X | | | | | | | 2 |
| Guinea-Bissau | | | | | X | | | | | | | | | | | | 1 |
| Ivory Coast | | X | X | X | | X | X | X | | X | X | X | X | X | | X | 12 |
| Kenya | | X | X | X | X | X | | X | X | | X | X | X | X | X | X | 13 |
| Lesotho | | X | X | X | | | | | X | X | | X | | | | | 6 |
| Libya | | | | X | | | X | | | | | | | | | | 2 |
| Madagascar | | | | | | | | | X | | X | | | | | | 2 |
| Malawi | | | | X | X | | | | | | | X | | | | | 3 |
| Mali | X | X | X | X | X | X | | | | | | X | | X | | | 8 |
| Mauritius | | | | | | X | | | | | | | | | | | 1 |
| Morocco | X | X | X | X | X | X | X | X | X | X | X | X | X | X | X | X | 16 |
| Niger | X | | X | X | | X | X | X | | | X | X | | | | | 8 |
| Nigeria | X | X | X | | X | X | X | X | X | X | X | X | X | X | X | X | 15 |
| São Tomé and Príncipe | | | X | | | | X | | X | | | | | | | | 3 |
| Senegal | X | X | X | X | X | X | X | X | X | X | X | X | | | | | 12 |
| Somalia | | | | X | | | | | | | X | X | | | X | | 4 |
| South Sudan | X | X | X | X | | X | | | | | X | | | | | | 6 |
| Sudan | X | X | X | X | X | | | | | | | | | | | | 5 |
| Togo | | | X | | | X | | | | | | | | | | | 2 |
| Tunisia | X | X | X | X | X | | | | X | X | X | | | | X | | 9 |
| Zimbabwe | | | | X | | X | X | | | | | | | | | | 3 |
| 38 NOCs | 13 | 20 | 24 | 26 | 16 | 16 | 13 | 9 | 15 | 14 | 13 | 14 | 9 | 8 | 8 | 9 | 227 |

== Results ==
=== Men ===
| Event | Gold | Silver | Bronze |
|---|---|---|---|
| –54 kg | Mohamed Khalil Jendoubi; Tunisia | Moaz Azat; Egypt | Moustapha Kama; Senegal Solomon Tufa Demse; Ethiopia |
| –58 kg | Omar Lakehal; Morocco | Issa Diakite; Ivory Coast | Casimir Betel; Chad Hedi Neffati; Tunisia |
| –63 kg | Tariku Girma; Ethiopia | Yassine Khezami; Tunisia | Abdelbaset Wasfi; Morocco Christ Seri; Ivory Coast |
| –68 kg | Ismael Yacouba; Niger | Abdelrahman Wael; Egypt | Aaron Kobenan; Ivory Coast Faical Saidi; Morocco |
| –74 kg | Firas Katoussi; Tunisia | Seif Eissa; Egypt | Soufiane Elasbi; Morocco Seydou Fofana; Mali |
| –80 kg | Cheick Sallah Cissé; Ivory Coast | Achraf Mahboubi; Morocco | Ababacar Sadikh Soumaré; Senegal Faysal Sawadogo; Burkina Faso |
| –87 kg | Seydou Gbané; Ivory Coast | Salaheldin Khairy; Egypt | Sunday Onofe; Nigeria Moustapha Fall; Senegal |
| +87 kg | Abdoul Razak Issoufou; Niger | Abdelrahman Darwish; Egypt | Benjamin Okuomose; Nigeria Anthony Obame; Gabon |

=== Women ===
| Event | Gold | Silver | Bronze |
|---|---|---|---|
| –46 kg | Soukaina Sahib; Morocco | Michelle Tau; Lesotho | Flore Mbubu; Democratic Republic of the Congo Karabo Kula; Botswana |
| –49 kg | Bouma Ferimata Coulibaly; Ivory Coast | Nour Abdelsalam; Egypt | Ikram Dhahri; Tunisia Rabab Ouhadi; Morocco |
| –53 kg | Chinazum Nwosu; Nigeria | Oumaima El-Bouchti; Morocco | Tsebaot Fikadu; Ethiopia Coumba Ndoye; Senegal |
| –57 kg | Nada Laaraj; Morocco | Radwa Nada; Egypt | Banassa Diomandé; Ivory Coast Tekiath Ben Yessouf; Niger |
| –62 kg | Safia Salih; Morocco | Rewan Refaei; Egypt | Vivian Chinwe Ndu; Nigeria Koumba Nanah-Hélène Ibo; Ivory Coast |
| –67 kg | Hedaya Malak; Egypt | Marie Frédérique Ekpitini; Ivory Coast | Elizabeth Anyanacho; Nigeria Urgence Mouega; Gabon |
| –73 kg | Maisoun Tolba; Egypt | Amani Layouni; Tunisia | Everlyne Aluocheolod; Kenya Uzoamaka Otuadinma; Nigeria |
| +73 kg | Fatima-Ezzahra Aboufaras; Morocco | Faith Ogallo; Kenya | Aminata Traoré; Ivory Coast Mennatullah Abdalaal; Egypt |

== Medal table ==
* Host nation (Morocco)

| Rank | Nation | Gold | Silver | Bronze | Total |
|---|---|---|---|---|---|
| 1 | Morocco (MAR)* | 5 | 2 | 4 | 11 |
| 2 | Ivory Coast (CIV) | 3 | 2 | 5 | 10 |
| 3 | Egypt (EGY) | 2 | 8 | 1 | 11 |
| 4 | Tunisia (TUN) | 2 | 2 | 2 | 6 |
| 5 | Niger (NIG) | 2 | 0 | 1 | 3 |
| 6 | Nigeria (NGR) | 1 | 0 | 5 | 6 |
| 7 | Ethiopia (ETH) | 1 | 0 | 2 | 3 |
| 8 | Kenya (KEN) | 0 | 1 | 1 | 2 |
| 9 | Lesotho (LES) | 0 | 1 | 0 | 1 |
| 10 | Senegal (SEN) | 0 | 0 | 4 | 4 |
| 11 | Gabon (GAB) | 0 | 0 | 2 | 2 |
| 12 | Botswana (BOT) | 0 | 0 | 1 | 1 |
| 12 | Burkina Faso (BUR) | 0 | 0 | 1 | 1 |
| 12 | Chad (CHA) | 0 | 0 | 1 | 1 |
| 12 | Democratic Republic of the Congo (COD) | 0 | 0 | 1 | 1 |
| 12 | Mali (MLI) | 0 | 0 | 1 | 1 |
| Totals (16 entries) | | 16 | 16 | 32 | 64 |
