= Faith Ogallo =

Kenyan taekwondo practitioner

Faith Ogallo OLY
Personal information
- Full name: Faith Ogallo
- Born: 3 February 1994 (age 32)

Sport
- Country: Kenya
- Sport: Taekwondo
- Weight class: +73 kg
Medal record
Representing Kenya
African Games
Silver medal – second place	2019 Rabat	+73 kg
Bronze medal – third place	2023 Accra	+73 kg
African Championships
Bronze medal – third place	2021 Dakar	+73 kg

Faith Ogallo (born 3 February 1994) is a Kenyan taekwondo practitioner. She represented Kenya at the 2020 Summer Olympics held in Tokyo, Japan after qualifying at the African Olympic Qualification Tournament held in Rabat, Morocco.

== Career ==
She previously competed in basketball but was recommended to switch to taekwondo by her Kibabii University taekwondo coach.

In 2019, she represented Kenya at the African Games held in Rabat, Morocco, and won the silver medal in the women's +73 kg event.

In 2021, she competed in the women's +67 kg event at the 2020 Summer Olympics in Tokyo, Japan.

In November 2021, she participated in the Queen's Baton Relay ahead of the 2022 Commonwealth Games.

== Achievements ==
Year	Tournament	Place	Weight class
2019	African Games	2nd	+73 kg
2021	African Championships	3rd	+73 kg
