= 2018 African Taekwondo Championships =

Taekwondo competition

The XI African Taekwondo Championships took place in Agadir, Morocco, in March 2018.

== Results ==
=== Men ===
Event	Gold	Silver	Bronze
–54 kg	Solomon Demse; Ethiopia	Moustapha Kama; Senegal	Moaz Nabil; Egypt; Amin El-Harmazi; Morocco
–58 kg	Hedi Nefati; Tunisia	Mohamed Farag; Egypt	Omar Lakehal; Morocco; Yusef Shriha; Libya
–63 kg	Wahid Briki; Tunisia	Oumar Sissoko; Mali	Mouhamed El-Mactar Diao; Senegal; Reda Benay; Morocco
–68 kg	Abdelrahman Wael; Egypt	Ismael Yacouba; Niger	Olusola Olowookere; Nigeria; Ibrahim Burkia; Morocco
–74 kg	Achraf Mahboubi; Morocco	Saifedin Trabelsi; Tunisia	Seif Eissa; Egypt; Arnold Nkoy; Democratic Republic of the Congo
–80 kg	Ababacar Sadikh Soumaré; Senegal	Cheick Sallah Cissé; Ivory Coast	Djibo Sani Yahaya; Niger; Bibis Hamza; Morocco
–87 kg	Seydou Gbané; Ivory Coast	Nuredin Ziani; Morocco	Karamoko Soumaré; Mali; Abdelrahman Darwish; Egypt
+87 kg	Anthony Obame; Gabon	Ayoub Bassel; Morocco	Firmin Zokou; Ivory Coast; Abdoulrazak Issoufou; Niger

=== Women ===
Event	Gold	Silver	Bronze
–46 kg	Soukaina Sahib; Morocco	Bouma Ferimata Coulibaly; Ivory Coast	Habiba Mansur; Egypt; Fadia Farhani; Tunisia
–49 kg	Nour Abdelsalam; Egypt	Ikram Dahri; Tunisia	Jadiya Duah; Morocco; Maria Andrade; Cape Verde
–53 kg	Oumaima El-Bouchti; Morocco	Rahma Ben Ali; Tunisia	Chinazum Nwosu; Nigeria; Radwa Reda; Egypt
–57 kg	Nada Laaraj; Morocco	Tekiath Ben Yessouf; Niger	Banassa Diomandé; Ivory Coast; Bineta Diedhiou; Senegal
–62 kg	Rewan Refaei; Egypt	Sukaina El-Auni; Morocco	Ornella Ngassa Sokeng; Cameroon; Naomie Katoka; Republic of the Congo
–67 kg	Ruth Gbagbi; Ivory Coast	Maisun Tolba; Egypt	Wafa El-Atri; Morocco; Independent Santos Carvalho; Cape Verde
–73 kg	Chaima Kriem; Morocco	Hedaya Malak; Egypt	Ameni Layuni; Tunisia; Sofia Reis; Cape Verde
+73 kg	Wiam Dislam; Morocco	Menatalá Abdelaal; Egypt	Epiphane Madjussem; Chad; Aminata Traoré; Ivory Coast

== Medal table ==
Rank	Nation	Gold	Silver	Bronze	Total
1	Morocco (MAR)	6	3	7	16
2	Egypt (EGY)	3	4	5	12
3	Tunisia (TUN)	2	3	2	7
4	Ivory Coast (CIV)	2	2	3	7
5	Senegal (SEN)	1	1	2	4
6	Ethiopia (ETH)	1	0	0	1
6	Gabon (GAB)	1	0	0	1
8	Niger (NIG)	0	2	2	4
9	Mali (MLI)	0	1	1	2
10	Cape Verde (CPV)	0	0	3	3
11	Nigeria (NGR)	0	0	2	2
12	Cameroon (CMR)	0	0	1	1
12	Chad (TCD)	0	0	1	1
12	Congo (CGO)	0	0	1	1
12	DR Congo (COD)	0	0	1	1
12	Libya (LBY)	0	0	1	1
Totals (16 entries)		16	16	32	64
