= Ababacar Sadikh Soumaré =

Senegalese taekwondo practitioner

Personal information
- Born: 3 July 1994 (age 32)

Sport
- Country: Senegal
- Sport: Taekwondo
- Weight class: 80 kg
Medal record
African Games
| Bronze medal – third place | 2019 Rabat | 80 kg |
African Taekwondo Championships
| Gold medal – first place | 2018 Agadir | 80 kg |
| Bronze medal – third place | 2021 Dakar | 80 kg |

Ababacar Sadikh Soumaré (born 3 July 1994) is a Senegalese taekwondo practitioner.

At the 2018 African Taekwondo Championships held in Agadir, Morocco, he won the gold medal in the men's 80 kg event.

In 2019, he represented Senegal at the African Games held in Rabat, Morocco and he won one of the bronze medals in the men's 80 kg event.
