= Taekwondo at the 2020 Summer Olympics – Men's 80 kg =

Taekwondo competition

Men's 80 kg at the Games of the XXXII Olympiad
- Venue: Makuhari Messe
- Date: 26 July 2021
- Competitors: 16 from 16 nations

Medalists
| 1st place, gold medalist(s) | | Maksim Khramtsov | ROC |
| 2nd place, silver medalist(s) | | Saleh El-Sharabaty | Jordan |
| 3rd place, bronze medalist(s) | | Toni Kanaet | Croatia |
| 3rd place, bronze medalist(s) | | Seif Eissa | Egypt |

The men's 80 kg competition in Taekwondo at the 2020 Summer Olympics was held on 26 July 2021, at the Makuhari Messe Hall A.

== Competition format ==
The main bracket consisted of a single elimination tournament, culminating in the gold medal match. The top eight athletes in each event were seeded so as not to face each other in the preliminary round. The remainder of the qualified athletes were drawn randomly. Two bronze medals were awarded at the Taekwondo competitions. A repechage was used to determine the bronze medal winners. Every competitor who lost to one of the two finalists competed in the repechage, another single-elimination competition. Each semifinal loser faced the last remaining repechage competitor from the opposite half of the bracket in a bronze medal match.

== Schedule ==
All times are in local time (UTC+9).

| Date | Time | Round |
|---|---|---|
| Monday, 26 July 2021 | 10:15; 14:15; 16:15; 19:15; 20:45; 21:45; 22:15 | Round of 16; Quarterfinals; Semifinals; Repechage; Bronze medal matches Gold medal match Award ceremony |

== Results ==
=== Main bracket ===
Round of 16
13 Simone Alessio (ITA) | 22
4 Ícaro Miguel Soares (BRA) | 3
5 Seif Eissa (EGY) | 11
12 Jack Marton (AUS) | 1
9 Toni Kanaet (CRO) | 21
8 Raúl Martínez (ESP) | 15
1 Maksim Khramtsov (ROC) | 13
16 Faysal Sawadogo (BUR) | 6
15 Liu Wei-ting (TPE) | 11
2 Milad Beigi (AZE) | 15
7 Nikita Rafalovich (UZB) | 17
10 Moisés Hernández (DOM) | 7
11 Richard Ordemann (NOR) | 4
6 Saleh El-Sharabaty (JOR) | 5
3 Cheick Sallah Cissé (CIV) | 11
14 Achraf Mahboubi (MAR) | 21

Quarter-finals
13 Simone Alessio (ITA) | 5
5 Seif Eissa (EGY) | 6
9 Toni Kanaet (CRO) | 0
1 Maksim Khramtsov (ROC) | 22
2 Milad Beigi (AZE) | 1
7 Nikita Rafalovich (UZB) | 12
6 Saleh El-Sharabaty (JOR) | 17
14 Achraf Mahboubi (MAR) | 15

Semi-finals
5 Seif Eissa (EGY) | 1
1 Maksim Khramtsov (ROC) | 13
7 Nikita Rafalovich (UZB) | 11
6 Saleh El-Sharabaty (JOR) | 13

Gold medal
1 Maksim Khramtsov (ROC) | 20
6 Saleh El-Sharabaty (JOR) | 9

=== Repechage ===
Repechage
Faysal Sawadogo (BUR) | 10
Toni Kanaet (CRO) | 30
Richard Ordemann (NOR) | 25
Achraf Mahboubi (MAR) | 10

Bronze medal
Nikita Rafalovich (UZB) | 18
Toni Kanaet (CRO) | 24
Seif Eissa (EGY) | 12
Richard Ordemann (NOR) | 4
