= Chaima Toumi =

Tunisian taekwondo athlete

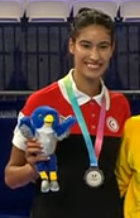
- At the 2025 Summer World University Games

Personal information
- Nationality: Tunisian
- Born: 23 September 2003 (age 23) La Marsa, Tunisia
Medal record
Women's taekwondo
Representing Tunisia
African Games
Gold medal – first place	2023 Accra	–57 kg
African Championships
Gold medal – first place	2023 Abidjan	–57 kg
Gold medal – first place	2021 Dakar	–53 kg
World University Games
Silver medal – second place	2025 Rhine-Ruhr	–57 kg
Mediterranean Games
Bronze medal – third place	2026 Taranto	–57 kg

Chaima Toumi (born 23 September 2003) is a Tunisian taekwondo practitioner. She won gold at the 2023 African Games and competed at the 2024 Summer Olympics.

== Career ==
She won the bronze medal at the 2018 Junior Taekwondo Championships in Hammemet, Tunisia. Competing at the 2018 African Youth Games in Algiers, Toumi won the gold medal in the -55 kg category.

She won gold at the 2021 African Taekwondo Championships in Dakar, Senegal in the 53kg division. She also won the gold medal in the under 57kg category at the 2023 African Championships in Abidjan. She also won the gold medal in the 57kg category at the 2023 African Games in Accra, Ghana.

She made it through the 2024 African Taekwondo Olympic Qualification Tournament to earn a place at the 2024 Olympic Games. She competed in Paris at the 2024 Summer Olympics At the -57 weight class, where she reached the quarter finals.

Toumi won the silver medal in the -57kg category at the 2025 World University Games in Germany after a 2-0 defeat to Maria Clara Pacheco of Brazil in the final.

== Personal life ==
She is trained by her father who is a taekwondo coach.
