= Ömer Faruk Dayıoğlu =

Turkish taekwondo practitioner

Sport
- Country: Turkey
- Sport: Taekwondo
Medal record
Men's taekwondo
Representing Turkey
Mediterranean Games
Bronze medal – third place	2022 Oran	58 kg
Islamic Solidarity Games
Silver medal – second place	2025 Riyadh	67 kg
World University Games
Silver medal – second place	2025 Rhine-Ruhr	63 kg
European Junior Championships
Gold medal – first place	2021 Sarajevo	59 kg

Ömer Faruk Dayıoğlu is a Turkish taekwondo practitioner. He competed at the 2022 Mediterranean Games, winning the bronze medal in the men's 58 kg event.
