= Taekwondo at the 2022 Mediterranean Games – Men's 58 kg =

Taekwondo – Men's 58 kg at the 2022 Mediterranean Games
- Venue: Mohammed Ben Ahmed Convention Centre
- Date: 4 July
- Competitors: 10 from 10 nations

Medalists
gold medal	Adrián Vicente	Spain
silver medal	Omar Lakehal	Morocco
bronze medal	Ömer Faruk Dayıoğlu	Turkey
bronze medal	Domen Molj	Slovenia

The men's 58 kg competition in taekwondo at the 2022 Mediterranean Games was held on 4 July at the Mohammed Ben Ahmed Convention Centre in Oran.

== Results ==
Legend

- PTG — Won by Points Gap
- SUP — Won by superiority
- OT — Won on over time (Golden Point)
- DQ — Won by disqualification
- PUN — Won by punitive declaration
- WD — Won by withdrawal

Round of 16
Saidi Attoui (ALG)	34^{PTG}
Marko Avramoski (MKD)	14
Herwan Onanga (FRA)	19
Giuseppe Foti (ITA)	17

Quarterfinals
Adrián Vicente (ESP)	28^{PTG}
Saidi Attoui (ALG)	8
Mostafa Mansour (EGY)	11
Domen Molj (SLO)	27
Josip Teskera (CRO)	5
Ömer Faruk Dayıoğlu (TUR)	50^{RSC}
Herwan Onanga (FRA)	5
Omar Lakehal (MAR)	29^{PTG}

Semifinals
Adrián Vicente (ESP)	41
Domen Molj (SLO)	9
Ömer Faruk Dayıoğlu (TUR)	23
Omar Lakehal (MAR)	26

Final
Adrián Vicente (ESP)	26
Omar Lakehal (MAR)	12
