= Seif Eissa =

Egyptian taekwondo practitioner

Personal information
- Born: 15 June 1998 (age 28) Cairo, Egypt
- Height: 196 cm (6 ft 5 in)

Sport
- Country: Egypt
- Sport: Taekwondo
- Weight class: 87 kg
Medal record
Men's taekwondo
Representing Egypt
Olympic Games
Bronze medal – third place	2020 Tokyo	80 kg
World Championships
Gold medal – first place	2025 Wuxi	87 kg
Bronze medal – third place	2022 Guadalajara	80 kg
Bronze medal – third place	2023 Baku	80 kg
Grand Prix
Silver medal – second place	2016 Baku (F)	80 kg
Silver medal – second place	2017 Rabat	80 kg
Silver medal – second place	2019 Sofia	80 kg
Silver medal – second place	2022 Rome	80 kg
Silver medal – second place	2023 Manchester (F)	80 kg
Bronze medal – third place	2018 Taoyuan	80 kg
Bronze medal – third place	2018 Manchester	80 kg
Bronze medal – third place	2022 Riyadh (F)	80 kg
African Games
Silver medal – second place	2015 Brazzaville	74 kg
Silver medal – second place	2019 Rabat	74 kg
Silver medal – second place	2023 Accra	80 kg
African Championships
Gold medal – first place	2021 Dakar	80 kg
Gold medal – first place	2022 Kigali	80 kg
Silver medal – second place	2016 Port Said	74 kg
Bronze medal – third place	2018 Agadir	74 kg
Mediterranean Games
Gold medal – first place	2022 Oran	80 kg
Silver medal – second place	2018 Tarragona	80 kg

Seif Eissa (Egyptian Arabic: سيف عيسى; born 15 June 1998) is an Egyptian Taekwondo practitioner & a bronze medalist at the 2020 Summer Olympics. He won a bronze medal at the 2014 Summer Youth Olympics in Nanjing, China. He also earned a gold medal at the 2015 African Games in Gaborone.

In 2020, he competed in the men's 80 kg event at the 2020 African Taekwondo Olympic Qualification Tournament in Rabat, Morocco and he qualified to represent Egypt at the 2020 Summer Olympics in Tokyo, Japan.

At the 2021 African Taekwondo Championships held in Dakar, Senegal, he won the gold medal in the men's 80 kg event. A few months later, at the 2020 Summer Olympics, he won one of the bronze medals in the 80 kg event.

He won the gold medal in the men's 80 kg event at the 2022 Mediterranean Games held in Oran, Algeria. He competed in the men's 80 kg event at the 2024 Summer Olympics held in Paris, France.
