= Taekwondo at the 2021 Islamic Solidarity Games – Women's 46 kg =

Taekwondo – Women's 46 kg at the 2021 Islamic Solidarity Games
- Venue: Selcuk University 19 Mayis Sport Hall
- Date: 11 August
- Competitors: 11 from 11 nations

Medalists
gold medal	Soukaina Sahib	Morocco
silver medal	Minaya Akbarova	Azerbaijan
bronze medal	Ida Kevine Bama	Burkina Faso
bronze medal	Zukhrakhon Tojimatova	Uzbekistan

The women's 46 kg competition in taekwondo at the 2021 Islamic Solidarity Games was held on 11 August 2021 at the Selcuk University 19 Mayis Sport Hall in Konya.

== Results ==
Legend

- PTG — Won by Points Gap
- SUP — Won by superiority
- OT — Won on over time (Golden Point)
- DQ — Won by disqualification
- PUN — Won by punitive declaration
- WD — Won by withdrawal

=== Main Bracket ===
1/8 finals
Heni Ni Kadek (INA)
Miar Qabaha (PLE)
Alia Besan (JOR)
Ahmed Aisha (UAE)
Fall Ngone (SEN)
Zukhrakhon Tojimatova (UZB)

Quarterfinals
Soukaina Sahib (MAR)
Heni Ni Kadek (INA)
Siby Aissata Mohamed (MLI)
Ida Kevine Bama (BUR)
Minaya Akbarova (AZE)
Alia Besan (JOR)
Zukhrakhon Tojimatova (UZB)
Emine Göğebakan (TUR)

Semifinals
Soukaina Sahib (MAR)
Ida Kevine Bama (BUR)
Minaya Akbarova (AZE)
Zukhrakhon Tojimatova (UZB)

Final
Soukaina Sahib (MAR)
Minaya Akbarova (AZE)
