= Ismael Yacouba =

Nigerien taekwondo practitioner (born 1993)

Personal information
- Full name: Ismael Yacouba Garba
- Born: 27 April 1993 (age 33) Niger
- Height: 183 cm (6 ft 0 in)

Sport
- Country: Niger
- Sport: Taekwondo
- Position: athlete
- University team: 1 participation at the world university games held in Tai pei, Taiwan
- Club: bronze medalist at the European clubs championships held in Zagreb, Croatia.

Achievements and titles
- World finals: 3 participations at the world taekwondo championships
- National finals: 7 times National champion
- Highest world ranking: 16
- Personal best: 7 medals at the world taekwondo opens tournaments
Medal record
Representing Niger
African Games
Gold medal – first place	2019 Rabat	68 kg
African Taekwondo Championships
Silver medal – second place	2018 Agadir	68 kg
Bronze medal – third place	2021 Dakar	68 kg

Ismael Yacouba Garba (born 27 April 1993) is a Nigerien taekwondo practitioner.

In 2017, he competed in the men's featherweight event at the World Taekwondo Championships held in Muju, South Korea. At the 2018 African Taekwondo Championships held in Agadir, Morocco, he won the silver medal in the men's 68 kg event.

In 2019, he competed in the men's featherweight event at the World Taekwondo Championships held in Manchester, United Kingdom. In the same year, he represented Niger at the 2019 African Games held in Rabat, Morocco and he won the gold medal in the men's 68 kg event. In the final, he defeated Abdelrahman Wael of Egypt.
