= Chinazum Nwosu =

Nigerian taekwondo practitioner

Personal information
- Full name: Chinazum Ruth Nwosu
- Born: 29 December 1994 (age 31)

Sport
- Country: Nigeria
- Sport: Taekwondo
- Weight class: 53 kg
Medal record
Women's taekwondo
Representing Nigeria
African Games
Gold medal – first place	2019 Rabat	53 kg
Silver medal – second place	2015 Brazzaville	53 kg
Bronze medal – third place	2023 Accra	53 kg
Bronze medal – third place	2023 Accra	Mixed team
African Taekwondo Championships
Bronze medal – third place	2016 Port Said	53 kg
Bronze medal – third place	2018 Agadir	53 kg
Bronze medal – third place	2021 Dakar	53 kg

Chinazum Ruth Nwosu (born 29 December 1994) is a Nigerian taekwondo practitioner. She won the gold medal in the women's 53 kg event at the 2019 African Games held in Rabat, Morocco. She also won the silver medal in this event at the 2015 African Games held in Brazzaville, Republic of the Congo.

== Career ==
At the 2016 African Taekwondo Olympic Qualification Tournament held in Agadir, Morocco, she won one of the bronze medals in the women's 57 kg event. In 2017, she competed in the women's bantamweight event at the 2017 World Taekwondo Championships held in Muju, South Korea. She was eliminated in her third match by Tatiana Kudashova of Russia. At the 2018 African Taekwondo Championships held in Agadir, Morocco, she won one of the bronze medals in the women's 53 kg event.

In 2019, she represented Nigeria at the 2019 African Games held in Rabat, Morocco and she won the gold medal in the women's 53 kg event. In the final, she defeated Oumaima El-Bouchti of Morocco. In 2020, she competed in the women's 57 kg event at the 2020 African Taekwondo Olympic Qualification Tournament in Rabat, Morocco. She finished in third place, and she did not qualify for the 2020 Summer Olympics in Tokyo, Japan.

== Achievements ==
Year	Tournament	Place	Weight class
2015	African Games	2nd	−53 kg
2016	African Taekwondo Championships	3rd	−53 kg
2018	African Taekwondo Championships	3rd	−53 kg
2019	African Games	1st	−53 kg
2021	African Taekwondo Championships	3rd	−53 kg
2024	African Games	3rd	−53 kg
