= Tatiana Kuzmina =

Russian taekwondo practitioner (born 1990)

Tatiana Kuzmina (born January 10, 1990) is a Russian Taekwondo athlete who won a bronze medal at the 2017 World Taekwondo Championships.

She won 3–2 in 1/4-Final against Iveta Jirankova, but lost in 1/2-Final to Iranian fighter Kimia Alizadeh.
