= Oumaima El-Bouchti =

Moroccan taekwondo practitioner

Personal information
- Native name: أميمة البوشتي
- Born: 7 October 2000 (age 25) Benslimane, Morocco

Sport
- Country: Morocco
- Sport: Taekwondo
- Weight class: 53 kg
Medal record
Women's taekwondo
Representing Morocco
African Taekwondo Championships
Gold medal – first place	2018 Agadir	53 kg
Gold medal – first place	2021 Dakar	49 kg
Gold medal – first place	2022 Kigali	53 kg
Gold medal – first place	2023 Abidjan	53 kg
African Games
Gold medal – first place	2023 Accra	Mixed team
Silver medal – second place	2019 Rabat	53 kg
Bronze medal – third place	2023 Accra	53 kg
Islamic Solidarity Games
Silver medal – second place	2021 Konya	53 kg
Bronze medal – third place	2025 Riyadh	51 kg
Mediterranean Games
Bronze medal – third place	2018 Tarragona	49 kg

Oumaima El-Bouchti (Arabic: أميمة البوشتي, born 7 October 2000) is a Moroccan taekwondo practitioner. She is a gold medalist four time at the African Taekwondo Championships. She represented Morocco at the 2020 Summer Olympics in Tokyo, and 2024 Summer Olympics in Paris.

== Career ==
At the 2018 African Taekwondo Championships in Agadir, Morocco, she won the gold medal in the women's 53 kg event. She also won one of the bronze medals in the women's 49 kg event at the 2018 Mediterranean Games in Tarragona, Spain.

In 2019, she competed in the women's bantamweight event at the World Taekwondo Championships held in Manchester, United Kingdom. In that same year, she represented Morocco at the 2019 African Games held in Rabat, Morocco and she won the silver medal in the women's 53 kg event. In the final, she lost against Chinazum Nwosu of Nigeria.

At the 2021 African Taekwondo Championships held in Dakar, Senegal, she won the gold medal in the women's 49 kg event. A few months later, she competed in the women's 49 kg event at the 2020 Summer Olympics held in Tokyo, Japan where she was eliminated in her first match by Sim Jae-young of South Korea.

== Achievements ==
Year	Tournament	Place	Weight class
2018	African Championships	1st	53 kg
2018	Mediterranean Games	3rd	49 kg
2019	African Games	2nd	53 kg
2021	African Championships	1st	49 kg
2022	African Championships	1st	53 kg
2023	African Championships	1st	53 kg
2024	African Games	3rd	53 kg
