= Ruth Gbagbi =

Ivorian taekwondo practitioner

Personal information
- Full name: Ruth Marie Christelle Gbagbi
- Nationality: Ivorian
- Born: 7 February 1994 (age 32) Abidjan, Ivory Coast
- Height: 1.78 m (5 ft 10 in)
Medal record
Women's taekwondo
Representing Ivory Coast
Olympic Games
Bronze medal – third place	2016 Rio De Janeiro	–67 kg
Bronze medal – third place	2020 Tokyo	–67 kg
World Championships
Gold medal – first place	2017 Muju	–62 kg
Bronze medal – third place	2023 Baku	–67 kg
Grand Prix
Gold medal – first place	2017 Moscow	–67 kg
Gold medal – first place	2019 Sofia	–67 kg
Gold medal – first place	2019 Moscow (F)	–67 kg
Gold medal – first place	2022 Paris	–67 kg
Silver medal – second place	2017 London	–67 kg
Silver medal – second place	2026 Paris	–67 kg
Bronze medal – third place	2017 Rabat	–67 kg
Bronze medal – third place	2017 Abidjan (F)	–67 kg
Bronze medal – third place	2022 Rome	–67 kg
Grand Slam
Gold medal – first place	2017 Wuxi	–67 kg
Bronze medal – third place	2018 Wuxi	–67 kg
African Games
Gold medal – first place	2015 Brazzaville	–62 kg
Bronze medal – third place	2011 Maputo	–57 kg
African Championships
Gold medal – first place	2012 Antananarivo	–62 kg
Gold medal – first place	2014 Tunis	–62 kg
Gold medal – first place	2016 Port Said	–62 kg
Gold medal – first place	2018 Agadir	–67 kg
Gold medal – first place	2021 Dakar	–67 kg
Gold medal – first place	2022 Kigali	–67 kg

Ruth Marie Christelle Gbagbi (born 7 February 1994 in Abidjan) is an Ivorian taekwondo practitioner. She competed in the 67 kg event at the 2012 Summer Olympics; she was defeated by Hwang Kyung-seon in the preliminary round and eliminated by Helena Fromm in the repechage contest. In the 2016 Summer Olympics, she defeated Farida Azizova to win the bronze medal. She was part of an Ivorian team that included Cheick Sallah Cissé who also won a medal and Mamina Koné. Gbagbi returned in the 2020 Summer Olympics, winning another bronze.
