= Vladimir Dalakliev =

Bulgarian taekwondo practitioner

Personal information
- Nationality: Bulgarian
- Born: January 29, 1992 (age 34)

Sport
- Sport: Taekwondo
- Coached by: Plamen Transki; Hristo Mihalchev; Slavcho Rachev Ivanov
Medal record
Men's taekwondo
Representing Bulgaria
World Championships
Bronze medal – third place	2017 Muju	Featherweight

Vladimir Dalakliev (Bulgarian: Владимир Далаклиев) (born January 29, 1992) is a Bulgarian taekwondo athlete who was a bronze medalist of the 2017 World Taekwondo Championships after being defeated by Lee Dae-hoon.
