= Abdelrahman Wael =

Egyptian taekwondo practitioner

Personal information
- Born: 7 September 1995 (age 30) Cairo, Egypt

Sport
- Country: Egypt
- Sport: Taekwondo
- University team: Cairo University
- Club: Egyptian Shooting Club
Medal record
Representing Egypt
African Games
Silver medal – second place	2019 Rabat	68 kg
African Championships
Gold medal – first place	2018 Agadir	68 kg
Gold medal – first place	2021 Dakar	68 kg
World Military Games
Bronze medal – third place	2019 Wuhan	68 kg
Universiade
Silver medal – second place	2019 Naples	Team

Abdelrahman Wael Mahmoud Abow (born 7 September 1995) is an Egyptian taekwondo competitor. He represented Egypt at the 2020 Summer Olympics held in Tokyo, Japan after qualifying at the 2020 African Taekwondo Olympic Qualification Tournament held in Rabat, Morocco.

== Career ==
He competed in the men's featherweight event at the 2017 World Taekwondo Championships held in Muju, South Korea.

At the 2018 African Taekwondo Championships held in Agadir, Morocco, he won the gold medal in the men's 68 kg event. In 2019, he competed in the men's featherweight event at the World Taekwondo Championships without winning a medal. A few months later, he represented Egypt at the 2019 African Games held in Rabat, Morocco and he won the silver medal in the men's 68 kg event. In the final, he lost against Ismael Yacouba of Niger.

At the 2021 African Taekwondo Championships held in Dakar, Senegal, he won the gold medal in the men's 68 kg event. He competed in the men's 68 kg event at the 2020 Summer Olympics held in Tokyo, Japan.
