= Solomon Demse =

Ethiopian taekwondo practitioner (born 1998)

Personal information
- Full name: Solomon Tufa Demse
- Born: 31 December 1998 (age 27)

Sport
- Country: Ethiopia
- Sport: Taekwondo
Medal record
Representing Ethiopia
African Games
Bronze medal – third place	2019 Rabat	54 kg
African Championships
Gold medal – first place	2018 Agadir	54 kg

Solomon Tufa Demse (born 31 December 1998) is an Ethiopian taekwondo practitioner. He represented Ethiopia at the 2020 Summer Olympics held in Tokyo, Japan.

== Career ==
He competed in the men's finweight event at the 2015 World Taekwondo Championships held in Chelyabinsk, Russia. He was eliminated in his first match.

In 2018, at the African Taekwondo Championships held in Agadir, Morocco, he won the gold medal in the men's 54 kg event.

He represented Ethiopia at the 2019 African Games held in Rabat, Morocco and he won one of the bronze medals in the men's 54 kg event.

He competed in the men's 58 kg event at the 2020 Summer Olympics held in Tokyo, Japan. He won his first match against Sergio Suzuki of Japan and he then lost against Mohamed Khalil Jendoubi of Tunisia. He was then eliminated in the repechage by Mikhail Artamonov of the ROC.

== Achievements ==
Year	Tournament	Place	Weight class
2014	African Youth Games	1st	54 kg
2018	African Championships	1st	54 kg
2019	African Games	3rd	54 kg
