= Konstantinos Chamalidis =

Greek taekwondo practitioner

Personal information
- Nationality: Greek
- Born: 16 April 1996 (age 30)
- Height: 1.80 m (5 ft 11 in)
- Weight: 68 kg (150 lb)

Sport
- Country: Greece
- Sport: Taekwondo
Medal record
Grand Prix
Bronze medal – third place	2023 Roma	68 kg
European Games
Bronze medal – third place	2023 Kraków-Małopolska	68 kg
Mediterranean Games
Silver medal – second place	2018 Tarragona	−68 kg
Bronze medal – third place	2022 Oran	−68 kg

Konstantinos Chamalidis is a Greek taekwondo athlete. He has won the national taekwondo championships.

== Career ==
In 2017, he competed in the men's featherweight event at the World Taekwondo Championships held in Muju, South Korea. He came second place at the 2017 Warsaw Cup.

He won a silver medal at the 2018 Mediterranean Games.

He won a bronze medal in the men's 68 kg event at the 2022 Mediterranean Games held in Oran, Algeria.
