= Achraf Mahboubi =

Moroccan taekwondo practitioner

Personal information
- Native name: أشرف محبوبي
- Born: 8 August 2000 (age 25)

Sport
- Country: Morocco
- Sport: Taekwondo
Medal record
Men's taekwondo
Representing Morocco
African Games
Silver medal – second place	2019 Rabat	80 kg
African Championships
Gold medal – first place	2018 Agadir	74 kg
Silver medal – second place	2021 Dakar	80 kg
Grand Prix
Bronze medal – third place	2019 Rome	80 kg

Achraf Mahboubi (Arabic: أشرف محبوبي, born 8 August 2000) is a Moroccan taekwondo practitioner. In 2021, he represented Morocco at the delayed 2020 Summer Olympics in Tokyo, Japan.

== Career ==
He competed in the men's lightweight event at the 2017 World Taekwondo Championships held in Muju, South Korea without winning a medal. He was eliminated in his second match by Kim Hun of South Korea.

At the 2018 African Taekwondo Championships held in Agadir, Morocco, he won the gold medal in the men's 74 kg event. In 2018, he also competed in the men's 80 kg event at the 2018 Mediterranean Games held in Tarragona, Catalonia, Spain without winning a medal. He was eliminated in his second match by Júlio Ferreira of Portugal.

In 2019, he competed in the men's welterweight event at the World Taekwondo Championships in Manchester, United Kingdom without winning a medal. As part of the 2019 World Taekwondo Grand Prix he won one of the bronze medals at the event held in Rome, Italy. In that same year, he also represented Morocco at the 2019 African Games held in Rabat, Morocco and he won the silver medal in the men's 80 kg event.

In 2020, he competed in the men's 80 kg event at the African Olympic Qualification Tournament in Rabat, Morocco and he qualified to represent Morocco at the 2020 Summer Olympics in Tokyo, Japan.

At the 2021 African Taekwondo Championships held in Dakar, Senegal, he won the silver medal in the men's 80 kg event. A few months later, at the 2020 Summer Olympics, he competed in the men's 80 kg event.

== Achievements ==
Year	Tournament	Place	Weight class
2018	African Championships	1st	74 kg
2019	African Games	2nd	80 kg
2021	African Championships	2nd	80 kg
