= Michelle Tau =

Lesotho taekwondo athlete

- Born: 1 April 1997; Lesotho
- Alma mater: National University of Lesotho
- Occupation: Taekwondo athlete

Michelle Tau (born 1 April 1997) is a Lesotho taekwondo athlete and beauty pageant contestant.

Michelle Tau was born on 1 April 1997 in Lesotho.

Tau competed in the 2017 Face of Beauty International pageant in New Delhi after being crowned Face of Lesotho.

Tau regularly competes in world taekwondo tournaments, taking home medals at the 2019 and 2023 African Games and the 2021 and 2023 African Taekwondo Championships. Tau was a batonbearer for the 2022 Commonwealth Games Queen's Baton Relay.

Tau failed to qualify for the 2020 Summer Olympics. She represented Lesotho at the 2024 Summer Olympics in the women's taekwondo -49 kg category, where she was defeated by eventual bronze medal winner Mobina Nematzadeh in the first round.

African Games
Year	Location	Medal	Category
2019	Rabat (Morocco)	Silver	–46 kg
2023	Acra (Ghana)	Bronze	–46 kg
African Taekwondo Championships
Year	Location	Medal	Category
2021	Dakar (Senegal)	Bronze	–46 kg
2023	Abiyán (Ivory Coast)	Bronze	–46 kg

Olympic Games
Preceded by None	Flagbearer for Lesotho; 2024 Paris	Succeeded by Incumbent
