= Seydou Fofana =

Malian taekwondo practitioner

Personal information
- Nationality: Malian
- Born: 10 August 1993 (age 32) Bamako, Mali

Sport
- Sport: Taekwondo
- Event: 74 kg
Medal record
Men's taekwondo
Representing Mali
African Games
Bronze medal – third place	2019 Rabat	–74 kg

Seydou Fofana (born 05 1989) is a Malian taekwondo practitioner. He won a bronze medal at the 2019 African Games in the men's –74 kg category. He qualified to represent Mali at the 2020 Summer Olympics after qualifying at the 2020 African Taekwondo Olympic Qualification Tournament.

Olympic Games
Preceded by Djénébou Danté	Flag bearer for Mali; Tokyo 2020	Succeeded by Marine Fatoumata Camara; Alexien Kouma
