= Faysal Sawadogo =

Burkino Faso taekwondo practitioner

Personal information
- Full name: Passamwinde Faysal Sawadogo
- Born: 22 September 1996 (age 29) Ouagadougou, Burkina Faso
Medal record
Men's taekwondo
Representing Burkina Faso
African Championships
Gold medal – first place	2023 Abidjan	–80 kg
Silver medal – second place	2022 Kigali	–80 kg
Bronze medal – third place	2021 Dakar	–80 kg
African Games
Bronze medal – third place	2023 Accra	–80 kg
Bronze medal – third place	2019 Rabat	–80 kg

Faysal Sawadogo (born 22 September 1996) is a male taekwondo practitioner from Burkina Faso.

== Personal life ==
He studies Economics & Management at Grenoble Alpes University, Saint-Martin-d'Heres.

== Career ==
He was named Athlete of the Year for 2017 by the Association of Sports Journalists of Burkina. He was a bronze medalist at the 2019 African Games and also a bronze medalist at the European Club Championships in 2020. Faysal Sawadogo also won bronze in June 2021 at the African Taekwondo Championships, held in Dakar, Senegal. He was selected for the Taekwondo at the 2020 Summer Olympics – Men's 80 kg.
