= Naomie Katoka =

Congolese taekwondo practitioner

Personal information
- Full name: Naomie Katoka Kasumpata
- Born: 10 August 1999 (age 26)
Medal record
Representing Democratic Republic of the Congo
African Taekwondo Championships
Bronze medal – third place	2018 Agadir	-62 kg

Naomie Katoka Kasumpata (born 10 August 1999) is a Congolese female taekwondo practitioner.

== Personal life ==
Educated at the Academy of Fine Arts, Kinshasa. She is married to Benjamin Matutadidi.

== Career ==
Katoka was a gold medalist in the under 63 kg category at the 2014 African Youth Games in Gaborone. In 2018 she won bronze at the 2018 African Taekwondo Championships, and she reached the quarterfinals of the 2019 African Games.

She was selected for the Taekwondo at the 2020 Summer Olympics – Women's 67 kg, by an invitation from the Tripartite Commission, but was disqualified prior to the first round.

While the Congolese federation released a statement saying she had been 300 grams overweight, it was also reported that she had been ruled unable to compete when a pre-fight medical examination revealed she was pregnant.
