= Javier Pérez (taekwondo) =

Spanish taekwondo practitioner

Personal information
- Nationality: Spanish
- Born: Javier Pérez Polo; 11 October 1996 (age 29) San Fernando de Henares, Madrid, Spain
- Height: 192 cm (6 ft 4 in)
- Weight: 68 kg (150 lb)

Sport
- Country: Spain
- Sport: Taekwondo
- Event: 68 kg
- College team: IES Ortega y Gasset; Universidad Complutense de Madrid
Medal record
Men's taekwondo
Representing Spain
World Championships
Silver medal – second place	2019 Manchester	68 kg
Grand Prix
Gold medal – first place	2022 Paris	68 kg
Silver medal – second place	2023 Manchester (F)	68 kg
Bronze medal – third place	2017 Rabat	68 kg
Bronze medal – third place	2023 Taiyuan	68 kg
European Games
Gold medal – first place	2023 Kraków-Małopolska	68 kg
European Championships
Silver medal – second place	2022 Manchester	68 kg
Bronze medal – third place	2021 Sofia	68 kg
Mediterranean Games
Gold medal – first place	2018 Tarragona	68 kg
Gold medal – first place	2022 Oran	68 kg
European U21 Championships
Gold medal – first place	2014 Innsbruck	63 kg
Bronze medal – third place	2015 Bukarest	63 kg

Javier Pérez Polo (Note: In this Spanish name, the first or paternal surname is Pérez and the second or maternal family name is Polo.) (born 11 October 1996) is a Spanish taekwondo athlete. He won the gold medal at the 2018 Mediterranean Games in the Men's 68 kg weight category.

He represented Spain at the 2020 Summer Olympics in the men's 68 kg weight category.

He won the gold medal in the men's 68 kg event at the 2022 Mediterranean Games held in Oran, Algeria.
