= Seydou Gbané =

Ivorian taekwondo practitioner

Personal information
- Born: 12 April 1992 (age 34)

Sport
- Country: Ivory Coast
- Sport: Taekwondo
- Weight class: 87 kg
Medal record
Representing Ivory Coast
African Games
Bronze medal – third place	2015 Brazzaville	-87 kg
Gold medal – first place	2019 Rabat	-87 kg
African Championships
Gold medal – first place	2018 Agadir	-87 kg

Seydou Gbané (born 12 April 1992) is an Ivorian taekwondo practitioner.

He competed at the African Games both in 2015 and in 2019. He won the bronze medal in the men's -87 kg event at the 2015 African Games held in Brazzaville, Republic of the Congo. He also competed at the 2019 African Games held in Rabat, Morocco and he won the gold medal in the men's -87 kg event.

He also won the gold medal in the men's -87 kg event at the 2018 African Taekwondo Championships held in Agadir, Morocco. In 2019, he competed in the men's middleweight event at the World Taekwondo Championships held in Manchester, United Kingdom.

He competed at the 2020 Summer Olympics held Tokyo, Japan in the men's +80 kg weight class.
