= African Taekwondo Championships =

Taekwondo competition

The African Taekwondo Championships are the African senior taekwondo championships and held every two years by the African Taekwondo Union along with the South African Taekwondo Federation, both the continental affiliates of World Taekwondo. This is a recognized G-4 senior event by World Taekwondo.

== Editions ==
All the listed editions of the tournament.

Edition	Year	Host city	Host country	Men's champion	Women's champion
1	1996	Johannesburg	South Africa	Lesotho	Kenya
2	1998	Nairobi	Kenya	Lesotho	Lesotho
3	2001	Dakar	Senegal	Senegal	Senegal
4	2003	Abuja	Nigeria	Egypt	Egypt
5	2005	Antananarivo	Madagascar	Ivory Coast	Ivory Coast
6	2009	Yaounde	Cameroon	Egypt	Morocco
7	2010	Tripoli	Libya	Tunisia	Morocco
8	2012	Antananarivo	Madagascar	Ivory Coast	Egypt
9	2014	Tunis	Tunisia	Egypt	Egypt
10	2016	Port Said	Egypt	Egypt	Egypt
11	2018	Agadir	Morocco	Tunisia	Morocco
12	2021	Dakar	Senegal	Tunisia	Morocco
13	2022	Kigali	Rwanda	Morocco	Morocco
14	2023	Abidjan	Ivory Coast	Morocco	Morocco
15	2026	Bamako	Mali	Morocco	Morocco

== All time medal table ==
List of medal count by countries updated as of the 2026 edition

Rank	Nation	Gold	Silver	Bronze	Total
1	Egypt	50	36	44	130
2	Morocco	44	27	40	111
3	Ivory Coast	33	33	55	121
4	Tunisia	27	19	25	71
5	Lesotho	15	9	13	37
6	Senegal	14	21	32	67
7	Kenya	9	15	21	45
8	Niger	9	5	13	27
9	Mali	5	8	31	44
10	South Africa	5	8	11	24
11	Libya	5	7	15	27
12	Gabon	5	6	24	35
13	Nigeria	2	9	19	30
14	Central African Republic	2	0	1	3
15	Burkina Faso	1	4	1	6
16	Madagascar	1	3	12	16
17	Algeria	1	2	8	11
18	Ethiopia	1	1	1	3
19	Uganda	1	0	6	7
20	Cape Verde	1	0	4	5
21	Equatorial Guinea	1	0	0	1
22	Congo	0	3	10	13
22	DR Congo	0	3	10	13
24	Cameroon	0	3	5	8
25	Ghana	0	1	6	7
26	Chad	0	1	5	6
27	Angola	0	1	2	3
28	Benin	0	1	1	2
28	Gambia	0	1	1	2
28	Sudan	0	1	1	2
28	Togo	0	1	1	2
32	Eswatini	0	0	5	5
33	Mauritius	0	0	3	3
33	Rwanda	0	0	3	3
35	Comoros	0	0	2	2
35	Mozambique	0	0	2	2
37	Guinea	0	0	1	1
37	Somalia	0	0	1	1
37	São Tomé and Príncipe	0	0	1	1
Totals (39 entries)		232	229	436	897

== See also ==
- African Junior Taekwondo Championships
