= Taekwondo at the 2018 Asian Games =

Taekwondo competition

- Venue: Jakarta Convention Center
- Dates: 19–23 August 2018
- Competitors: 287 from 35 nations

Taekwondo at the 2018 Asian Games was held at the Jakarta Convention Center Plenary Hall, Jakarta, Indonesia, from 19 to 23 August 2018.

== Schedule ==
P	Preliminary rounds	F	Semifinals & Final

Event↓/Date →	19th Sun		20th Mon		21st Tue		22nd Wed		23rd Thu	
Men's individual poomsae	P	F								
Men's team poomsae	P	F								
Men's 58 kg			P	F						
Men's 63 kg							P	F		
Men's 68 kg									P	F
Men's 80 kg							P	F		
Men's +80 kg					P	F				
Women's individual poomsae	P	F								
Women's team poomsae	P	F								
Women's 49 kg									P	F
Women's 53 kg			P	F						
Women's 57 kg					P	F				
Women's 67 kg			P	F						
Women's +67 kg					P	F				

== Medalists ==
=== Poomsae ===
Event	Gold	Silver	Bronze
Men's individual	Kang Min-sung; South Korea	Kourosh Bakhtiar; Iran	Chen Ching; Chinese Taipei
Men's individual	Kang Min-sung; South Korea	Kourosh Bakhtiar; Iran	Pongporn Suvittayarak; Thailand
Men's team	South Korea; Han Yeong-hun; Kim Seon-ho; Kang Wan-jin	China; Zhu Yuxiang; Hu Mingda; Deng Tingfeng	Philippines; Dustin Mella; Jeordan Dominguez; Rodolfo Reyes
Men's team	South Korea; Han Yeong-hun; Kim Seon-ho; Kang Wan-jin	China; Zhu Yuxiang; Hu Mingda; Deng Tingfeng	Vietnam; Nguyễn Thiên Phụng; Lê Thanh Trung; Trần Tiến Khoa
Women's individual	Defia Rosmaniar; Indonesia	Marjan Salahshouri; Iran	Yap Khim Wen; Malaysia
Women's individual	Defia Rosmaniar; Indonesia	Marjan Salahshouri; Iran	Yun Ji-hye; South Korea
Women's team	Thailand; Kotchawan Chomchuen; Phenkanya Phaisankiattikun; Ornawee Srisahakit	South Korea; Gwak Yeo-won; Choi Dong-ah; Park Jae-eun	Philippines; Juvenile Crisostomo; Rinna Babanto; Janna Oliva
Women's team	Thailand; Kotchawan Chomchuen; Phenkanya Phaisankiattikun; Ornawee Srisahakit	South Korea; Gwak Yeo-won; Choi Dong-ah; Park Jae-eun	Chinese Taipei; Chen Hsiang-ting; Chen Yi-hsuan; Lin Kan-yu

=== Men's kyorugi ===
Event	Gold	Silver	Bronze
Flyweight (−58 kg)	Kim Tae-hun; South Korea	Niyaz Pulatov; Uzbekistan	Sergio Suzuki; Japan
Flyweight (−58 kg)	Kim Tae-hun; South Korea	Niyaz Pulatov; Uzbekistan	Farzan Ashourzadeh; Iran
Bantamweight (−63 kg)	Mirhashem Hosseini; Iran	Zhao Shuai; China	Ho Chia-hsin; Chinese Taipei
Bantamweight (−63 kg)	Mirhashem Hosseini; Iran	Zhao Shuai; China	Cho Gang-min; South Korea
Featherweight (−68 kg)	Lee Dae-hoon; South Korea	Amir Mohammad Bakhshi; Iran	Yerassyl Kaiyrbek; Kazakhstan
Featherweight (−68 kg)	Lee Dae-hoon; South Korea	Amir Mohammad Bakhshi; Iran	Ahmad Abughaush; Jordan
Welterweight (−80 kg)	Nikita Rafalovich; Uzbekistan	Lee Hwa-jun; South Korea	Saleh El-Sharabaty; Jordan
Welterweight (−80 kg)	Nikita Rafalovich; Uzbekistan	Lee Hwa-jun; South Korea	Nurlan Myrzabayev; Kazakhstan
Heavyweight (+80 kg)	Saeid Rajabi; Iran	Dmitriy Shokin; Uzbekistan	Hamza Kattan; Jordan
Heavyweight (+80 kg)	Saeid Rajabi; Iran	Dmitriy Shokin; Uzbekistan	Ruslan Zhaparov; Kazakhstan

=== Women's kyorugi ===
Event	Gold	Silver	Bronze
Flyweight (−49 kg)	Panipak Wongpattanakit; Thailand	Madinabonu Mannopova; Uzbekistan	Nahid Kiani; Iran
Flyweight (−49 kg)	Panipak Wongpattanakit; Thailand	Madinabonu Mannopova; Uzbekistan	Miyu Yamada; Japan
Bantamweight (−53 kg)	Su Po-ya; Chinese Taipei	Ha Min-ah; South Korea	Laetitia Aoun; Lebanon
Bantamweight (−53 kg)	Su Po-ya; Chinese Taipei	Ha Min-ah; South Korea	Fariza Aldangorova; Kazakhstan
Featherweight (−57 kg)	Luo Zongshi; China	Lee Ah-reum; South Korea	Vipawan Siripornpermsak; Thailand
Featherweight (−57 kg)	Luo Zongshi; China	Lee Ah-reum; South Korea	Pauline Lopez; Philippines
Welterweight (−67 kg)	Julyana Al-Sadeq; Jordan	Kim Jan-di; South Korea	Zhang Mengyu; China
Welterweight (−67 kg)	Julyana Al-Sadeq; Jordan	Kim Jan-di; South Korea	Nigora Tursunkulova; Uzbekistan
Heavyweight (+67 kg)	Lee Da-bin; South Korea	Cansel Deniz; Kazakhstan	Gao Pan; China
Heavyweight (+67 kg)	Lee Da-bin; South Korea	Cansel Deniz; Kazakhstan	Svetlana Osipova; Uzbekistan

== Medal table ==
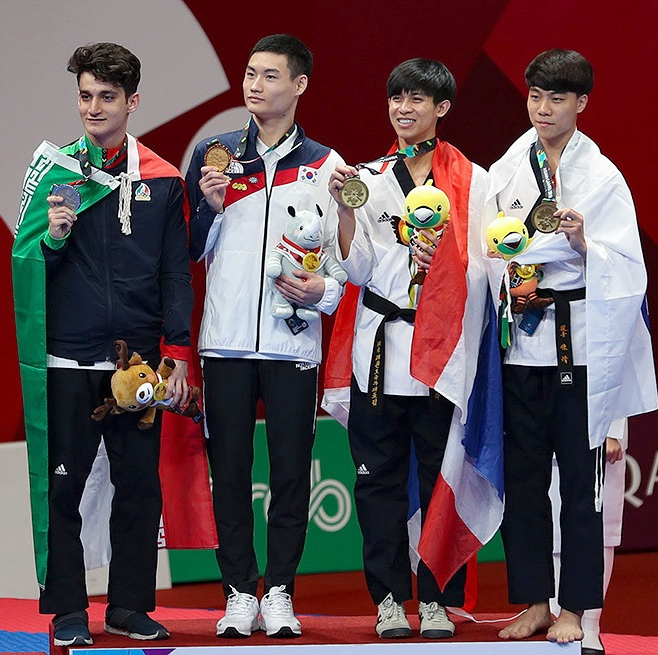
Men's poomsae podium

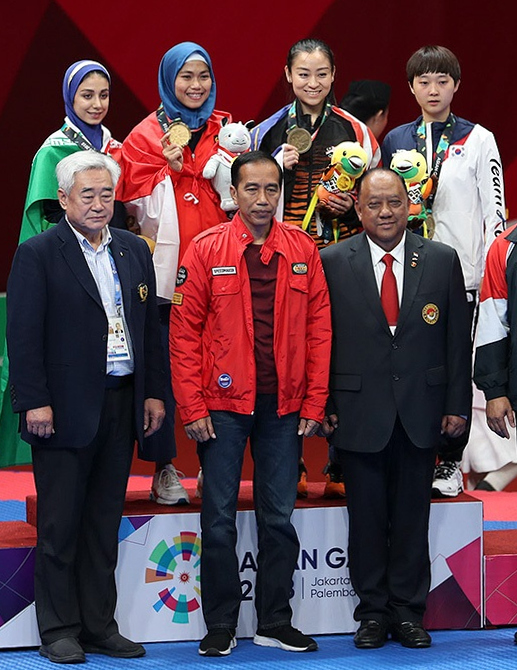
Women's poomsae podium

Rank	Nation	Gold	Silver	Bronze	Total
1	South Korea (KOR)	5	5	2	12
2	Iran (IRI)	2	3	2	7
3	Thailand (THA)	2	0	2	4
4	Uzbekistan (UZB)	1	3	2	6
5	China (CHN)	1	2	2	5
6	Chinese Taipei (TPE)	1	0	3	4
6	Jordan (JOR)	1	0	3	4
8	Indonesia (INA)	1	0	0	1
9	Kazakhstan (KAZ)	0	1	4	5
10	Philippines (PHI)	0	0	3	3
11	Japan (JPN)	0	0	2	2
12	Lebanon (LBN)	0	0	1	1
12	Malaysia (MAS)	0	0	1	1
12	Vietnam (VIE)	0	0	1	1
Totals (14 entries)		14	14	28	56

== Participating nations ==
A total of 287 athletes from 35 nations competed in taekwondo at the 2018 Asian Games:

- Afghanistan (4)
- Bahrain (1)
- Bhutan (8)
- Cambodia (6)
- China (16)
- Chinese Taipei (18)
- Hong Kong (8)
- India (8)
- Indonesia (18)
- Iran (16)
- Japan (6)
- Jordan (6)
- Kazakhstan (14)
- Kyrgyzstan (1)
- Laos (7)
- Lebanon (2)
- Macau (5)
- Malaysia (7)
- Mongolia (4)
- Myanmar (4)
- Nepal (14)
- Pakistan (6)
- Palestine (1)
- Philippines (17)
- Qatar (3)
- Saudi Arabia (8)
- South Korea (18)
- Sri Lanka (6)
- Tajikistan (4)
- Thailand (13)
- Timor-Leste (6)
- United Arab Emirates (1)
- Uzbekistan (16)
- Vietnam (13)
- Yemen (2)
