= 2017 World Taekwondo Championships – Women's welterweight =

Taekwondo competition

Women's welterweight at the 2017 World Championships
- Venue: Taekwondowon
- Dates: 26–27 June 2017
- Competitors: 35 from 35 nations

Medalists
gold medal	Nur Tatar	Turkey
silver medal	Paige McPherson	United States
bronze medal	Kim Jan-di	South Korea
bronze medal	Zhang Mengyu	China

The women's welterweight is a competition featured at the 2017 World Taekwondo Championships, and was held at the Taekwondowon in Muju County, South Korea on June 26 and June 27. Welterweight were limited to a maximum of 67 kilograms in body mass.

== Results ==
Legend

- DQ — Won by disqualification
- P — Won by punitive declaration

=== Finals ===
Semifinals		Final
Nur Tatar (TUR)	11
Kim Jan-di (KOR)	9	Nur Tatar (TUR)	6
Paige McPherson (USA)	6	Paige McPherson (USA)	4
Zhang Mengyu (CHN)	5

=== Top half ===
==== Section 1 ====
Round of 64
Shreya Singh (IND)	6
Melika Mirhosseini (IRI)	27

Round of 32
Nur Tatar (TUR)	4
Melika Mirhosseini (IRI)	2
Dunja Lemajić (SLO)	4
Nigora Tursunkulova (UZB)	22
Matea Jelić (CRO)	5
Eva Calvo (ESP)	0
Deysy Montes de Oca (DOM)	2
Katherine Dumar (COL)	3

Round of 16
Nur Tatar (TUR)	4
Nigora Tursunkulova (UZB)	2
Matea Jelić (CRO)	4
Katherine Dumar (COL)	2

Quarterfinals
Nur Tatar (TUR)	5
Matea Jelić (CRO)	4

==== Section 2 ====
Round of 64

Round of 32
Farida Azizova (AZE)	24
Isabelle Faber (LUX)	1
Julyana Al-Sadeq (JOR)	5
Vanessa Körndl (GER)	6
Polina Khan (RUS)	8
Feruza Yergeshova (KAZ)	4
Victoria Heredia (MEX)	6
Kim Jan-di (KOR)	17^{P}

Round of 16
Farida Azizova (AZE)	7
Vanessa Körndl (GER)	6
Polina Khan (RUS)	8
Kim Jan-di (KOR)	14

Quarterfinals
Farida Azizova (AZE)	0
Kim Jan-di (KOR)	7

=== Bottom half ===
==== Section 3 ====
Round of 64
Bắc Thị Khiêm (VIE)	8
Laura Roebben (BEL)	9

Round of 32
Paige McPherson (USA)	20
Laura Roebben (BEL)	10
Ruth Hock (AUS)	3
Anika Godel-Chełmecka (POL)	8
Tetiana Tetereviatnykova (UKR)	5
Liu Qing (MAC)	6
Valerie Loureda (PAR)	2
Melissa Pagnotta (CAN)	24

Round of 16
Paige McPherson (USA)	16
Anika Godel-Chełmecka (POL)	7
Liu Qing (MAC)	6
Melissa Pagnotta (CAN)	12

Quarterfinals
Paige McPherson (USA)	12
Melissa Pagnotta (CAN)	10

==== Section 4 ====
Round of 64
~~Souhila Smaili (ALG)~~
Zhang Mengyu (CHN)	DQ

Round of 32
Lauren Williams (GBR)	29
Marie Frédérique Ekpitini (CIV)	7
Athanasia Mitsopoulou (GRE)	12
Katherine Alvarado (CRC)	9
Rebeka Füredi (HUN)	8
Milena Titoneli (BRA)	12
Zhang Mengyu (CHN)	15
Chuang Chia-chia (TPE)	5

Round of 16
Lauren Williams (GBR)	23
Athanasia Mitsopoulou (GRE)	21
Milena Titoneli (BRA)	2
Zhang Mengyu (CHN)	12

Quarterfinals
Lauren Williams (GBR)	22
Zhang Mengyu (CHN)	31
