= 2019 World Taekwondo Championships – Women's welterweight =

Women's welterweight at the 2019 World Championships
- Venue: Manchester Arena
- Dates: 18–19 May 2019
- Competitors: 43 from 43 nations

Medalists
gold medal	Zhang Mengyu	China
silver medal	Nur Tatar	Turkey
bronze medal	Milena Titoneli	Brazil
bronze medal	Farida Azizova	Azerbaijan

The women's welterweight is a competition featured at the 2019 World Taekwondo Championships, and was held at the Manchester Arena in Manchester, United Kingdom on 18 and 19 May. Welterweights were limited to a maximum of 67 kilograms in body mass.

== Results ==
Legend

- DQ — Won by disqualification

=== Finals ===
Semifinals		Final
Nur Tatar (TUR)	20
Milena Titoneli (BRA)	3	Nur Tatar (TUR)	9
Farida Azizova (AZE)	5	Zhang Mengyu (CHN)	18
Zhang Mengyu (CHN)	18

=== Top half ===
==== Section 1 ====
Round of 64
Wafa El-Atri (MAR)	6
Chuang Kuan-yu (TPE)	12
Indra Craen (BEL)	28
Iris Jović Vujaković (SRB)	7
Iveta Jiránková (CZE)	7
Lâm Thị Hà Thanh (VIE)	6

Round of 32
Nur Tatar (TUR)	18
Chuang Kuan-yu (TPE)	6
Rebeka Füredi (HUN)	6
Tetiana Tetereviatnykova (UKR)	9
Nigora Tursunkulova (UZB)	15
Indra Craen (BEL)	9
Iveta Jiránková (CZE)	16
Julyana Al-Sadeq (JOR)	19

Round of 16
Nur Tatar (TUR)	13
Tetiana Tetereviatnykova (UKR)	3
Nigora Tursunkulova (UZB)	2
Julyana Al-Sadeq (JOR)	6

Quarterfinals
Nur Tatar (TUR)	9
Julyana Al-Sadeq (JOR)	5

==== Section 2 ====
Round of 64
Diana Chirinos (PER)	4
Rewan Refaei (EGY)	21
Axaule Yerkassimova (KAZ)	8
Isabella Díaz (PUR)	14

Round of 32
Kim Jan-di (KOR)	20
Rewan Refaei (EGY)	0
Katherine Dumar (COL)	8
Milena Titoneli (BRA)	8
Haby Niaré (FRA)	24
Athanasia Mitsopoulou (GRE)	6
Isabella Díaz (PUR)	3
Matea Jelić (CRO)	15

Round of 16
Kim Jan-di (KOR)	15
Milena Titoneli (BRA)	16
Haby Niaré (FRA)	5
Matea Jelić (CRO)	21

Quarterfinals
Milena Titoneli (BRA)	14
Matea Jelić (CRO)	13

=== Bottom half ===
==== Section 3 ====
Round of 64
Arlettys Acosta (CUB)	3
Kimia Hemmati (IRI)	5
Andreea Mocanu (ROU)	6
Daniela Rotolo (ITA)	23
Randi Dyngeland (NOR)	12
Chan Hok Ming (HKG)	11

Round of 32
Lauren Williams (GBR)	15
Kimia Hemmati (IRI)	31
Katherine Alvarado (CRC)	7
Farida Azizova (AZE)	11
Melissa Pagnotta (CAN)	11
Daniela Rotolo (ITA)	4
Randi Dyngeland (NOR)	5
Ruth Gbagbi (CIV)	25

Round of 16
Kimia Hemmati (IRI)	8
Farida Azizova (AZE)	21
Melissa Pagnotta (CAN)	16
Ruth Gbagbi (CIV)	19

Quarterfinals
Farida Azizova (AZE)	8
Ruth Gbagbi (CIV)	6

==== Section 4 ====
Round of 64
~~Warkha Ngom (SEN)~~
Celine Schmidt (GER)	DQ
Eva Calvo (ESP)	24
Nicole Kashouli (CYP)	3
Eliza Zbrzezna (POL)	19
Isabelle Faber (LUX)	6

Round of 32
Zhang Mengyu (CHN)	6
Celine Schmidt (GER)	5
Eva Calvo (ESP)	7
Polina Khan (RUS)	8
Elin Johansson (SWE)	2
Victoria Heredia (MEX)	12
Eliza Zbrzezna (POL)	2
Paige McPherson (USA)	11

Round of 16
Zhang Mengyu (CHN)	5
Polina Khan (RUS)	3
Victoria Heredia (MEX)	4
Paige McPherson (USA)	11

Quarterfinals
Zhang Mengyu (CHN)	9
Paige McPherson (USA)	3
