= Taekwondo at the 2020 Summer Olympics – Women's 67 kg =

Taekwondo competition

Women's 67 kg at the Games of the XXXII Olympiad
- Venue: Makuhari Messe
- Date: 26 July 2021

Medalists
1st place, gold medalist(s)		Matea Jelić	Croatia
2nd place, silver medalist(s)		Lauren Williams	Great Britain
3rd place, bronze medalist(s)		Ruth Gbagbi	Ivory Coast
3rd place, bronze medalist(s)		Hedaya Wahba	Egypt

The women's 67 kg competition in Taekwondo at the 2020 Summer Olympics was held on 26 July 2021, at the Makuhari Messe Hall A.

== Results ==
=== Main bracket ===
Round of 16
13 Elizabeth Anyanacho (NGR)	7
4 Nur Tatar (TUR)	12
5 Paige McPherson (USA)	8
12 Farida Azizova (AZE)	5
9 Milena Titoneli (BRA)	9^{SUP}
8 Julyana Al-Sadeq (JOR)	9
1 Matea Jelić (CRO)	22
16 Lauren Lee (HAI)	2
15 Naomie Katoka (COD)	DSQ
2 Ruth Gbagbi (CIV)	WIN
7 Zhang Mengyu (CHN)	12
10 Nigora Tursunkulova (UZB)	9
11 Hedaya Wahba (EGY)	11
6 Magda Wiet-Hénin (FRA)	10
3 Lauren Williams (GBR)	RSC
14 Malia Paseka (TGA)

Quarter-finals
4 Nur Tatar (TUR)	1
5 Paige McPherson (USA)	3
9 Milena Titoneli (BRA)	9
1 Matea Jelić (CRO)	30
2 Ruth Gbagbi (CIV)	21
7 Zhang Mengyu (CHN)	9
11 Hedaya Wahba (EGY)	12
3 Lauren Williams (GBR)	13

Semi-finals
5 Paige McPherson (USA)	4
1 Matea Jelić (CRO)	15
2 Ruth Gbagbi (CIV)	18
3 Lauren Williams (GBR)	24

Gold medal
1 Matea Jelić (CRO)	25
3 Lauren Williams (GBR)	22

=== Repechage ===
Repechage			Bronze Medal
			2	Ruth Gbagbi (CIV)	12
			9	Milena Titoneli (BRA)	8
16	Lauren Lee (HAI)	5	9	Milena Titoneli (BRA)	8
9	Milena Titoneli (BRA)	26

Repechage			Bronze Medal
			5	Paige McPherson (USA)	6
			11	Hedaya Wahba (EGY)	17
14	Malia Paseka (TGA)	0	11	Hedaya Wahba (EGY)	17
11	Hedaya Wahba (EGY)	19
