= 2019 World Taekwondo Championships – Women's finweight =

Women's finweight at the 2019 World Championships
- Venue: Manchester Arena
- Dates: 15–16 May 2019
- Competitors: 39 from 38 nations

Medalists
gold medal	Sim Jae-young	South Korea
silver medal	Mahla Momenzadeh	Iran
bronze medal	Tan Xueqin	China
bronze medal	Julanan Khantikulanon	Thailand

The women's finweight is a competition featured at the 2019 World Taekwondo Championships, and was held at the Manchester Arena in Manchester, United Kingdom on 15 and 16 May. Finweights were limited to a maximum of 46 kilograms (101.4 pounds; 7.24 stones) in body mass.

== Results ==
Legend

- DQ — Won by disqualification
- P — Won by punitive declaration
- R — Won by referee stop contest

=== Finals ===
Semifinals		Final
Tan Xueqin (CHN)	9
Mahla Momenzadeh (IRI)	11	Mahla Momenzadeh (IRI)	6
Sim Jae-young (KOR)	25	Sim Jae-young (KOR)	11
Julanan Khantikulanon (THA)	13

=== Top half ===
==== Section 1 ====
Round of 64
Diana Nava (MEX)	5
Veronica Garces (PHI)	24

Round of 32
Yvette Yong (CAN)	23
Veronica Garces (PHI)	13
Filiz Ögel (TUR)	28
Rivka Bayech (ISR)	26
Andrea Ramírez (COL)	10
Vanesa Markova (BUL)	8
Sofia Tournier (ARG)	9
Tan Xueqin (CHN)	34

Round of 16
Yvette Yong (CAN)	20
Filiz Ögel (TUR)	12
Andrea Ramírez (COL)	7
Tan Xueqin (CHN)	29

Quarterfinals
Yvette Yong (CAN)	13
Tan Xueqin (CHN)	18

==== Section 2 ====
Round of 64
Natyra Kadriu (KOS)	4
Teodora Jović (SRB)	29
Mahla Momenzadeh (IRI)	21
Ainur Uashpay (KAZ)	1

Round of 32
Iryna Romoldanova (UKR)	10
Teodora Jović (SRB)	8
Monique Rodriguez (USA)	8
Lena Stojković (CRO)	28
Hajer Mustapha (FRA)	12
Galina Medvedeva (RUS)	17
Mahla Momenzadeh (IRI)	17
Jordyn Smith (GBR)	7

Round of 16
Iryna Romoldanova (UKR)	16
Lena Stojković (CRO)	17
Galina Medvedeva (RUS)	3
Mahla Momenzadeh (IRI)	23

Quarterfinals
Lena Stojković (CRO)	20
Mahla Momenzadeh (IRI)	30

=== Bottom half ===
==== Section 3 ====
Round of 64
Michelle Tau (LES)	13
Sara Cortegoso (ESP)	19
Krystsina Sauluk (BLR)	DQ
~~Ana Belo (TLS)~~

Round of 32
Dina Pouryounes (WT)	8
Sara Cortegoso (ESP)	19
Andrea Schnell (SUI)	12
Özlem Gürüz (GER)	13
Valéria Santos (BRA)	14
Ioanna Koutsou (GRE)	8
Krystsina Sauluk (BLR)	3
Sim Jae-young (KOR)	25

Round of 16
Sara Cortegoso (ESP)	18^{P}
Özlem Gürüz (GER)	5
Valéria Santos (BRA)	8
Sim Jae-young (KOR)	23

Quarterfinals
Sara Cortegoso (ESP)	15
Sim Jae-young (KOR)	19

==== Section 4 ====
Round of 64
Célia Truzão (MOZ)	6
Julanan Khantikulanon (THA)	48^{R}
Wong Shuk Han (HKG)	1
Hung Yu-ting (TPE)	21

Round of 32
Trương Thị Kim Tuyền (VIE)	18
Julanan Khantikulanon (THA)	20
Sofia Zampetti (ITA)	18
Fadia Farhani (TUN)	32
Soukaina Sahib (MAR)	15
Katherine Calderón (PER)	1
Hung Yu-ting (TPE)	19
Kyriaki Kouttouki (CYP)	1

Round of 16
Julanan Khantikulanon (THA)	16
Fadia Farhani (TUN)	13
Soukaina Sahib (MAR)	18
Hung Yu-ting (TPE)	14

Quarterfinals
Julanan Khantikulanon (THA)	22
Soukaina Sahib (MAR)	19
