= Taekwondo at the 2017 SEA Games =

Taekwondo competition

- Venue: Kuala Lumpur Convention Centre Hall 1
- Location: Kuala Lumpur, Malaysia
- Date: 26–29 August 2017

The Taekwondo competitions at the 2017 SEA Games in Kuala Lumpur took place at Kuala Lumpur Convention Centre.

== Medalists ==
=== Poomsae ===
Event	Gold	Silver	Bronze
Men's singles	Chew Wei Yan; Malaysia	Maulana Haidir; Indonesia	Rodolfo Reyes, Jr. Philippines
Men's singles	Chew Wei Yan; Malaysia	Maulana Haidir; Indonesia	Sun Shine; Myanmar
Women's singles	Yap Khim Wen; Malaysia	Philavong Kidavone; Laos	Chelsea Ann Sim Shu Zhen; Singapore
Women's singles	Yap Khim Wen; Malaysia	Philavong Kidavone; Laos	Thet Myat Noe Wai; Myanmar
Men's team	Philippines; Dustin Jacob Mella; Raphael Enrico Mella; Rodolfo Reyes, Jr.	Malaysia; Chew Wei Yan; Kok Jun Ee; Yong Jin Kun	Vietnam; Hồ Thanh Phong; Lê Hiếu Nghĩa; Nguyễn Thiên Phụng
Men's team	Philippines; Dustin Jacob Mella; Raphael Enrico Mella; Rodolfo Reyes, Jr.	Malaysia; Chew Wei Yan; Kok Jun Ee; Yong Jin Kun	Indonesia; Maulana Haidir; M. Abdurrahman Wahyu; Muhammad Alfi Kusuma
Women's team	Vietnam; Châu Tuyết Vân; Liên Thị Tuyết Mai; Nguyễn Thị Lệ Kim	Thailand; Katesara Kiatatchawachai; Ornawee Srisahakit; Phenkanya Phaisankiattikun	Philippines; Jocel Lyn Ninobla; Juvenile Faye Crisostomo; Rinna Babanto
Women's team	Vietnam; Châu Tuyết Vân; Liên Thị Tuyết Mai; Nguyễn Thị Lệ Kim	Thailand; Katesara Kiatatchawachai; Ornawee Srisahakit; Phenkanya Phaisankiattikun	Indonesia; Defia Rosmaniar; Mutiara Habiba; Ruhil
Mixed pair	Thailand; Ornawee Srisahakit; Pongporn Suvittayarak	Malaysia; Yap Khim Wen; Yong Jin Kun	Vietnam; Châu Tuyết Vân; Hồ Thanh Phong
Mixed pair	Thailand; Ornawee Srisahakit; Pongporn Suvittayarak	Malaysia; Yap Khim Wen; Yong Jin Kun	Cambodia; Sim Rachana; Tuon Navut

=== Kyorugi ===
==== Men ====
Event	Gold	Silver	Bronze
Finweight; 54 kg	Ramnarong Sawekwiharee; Thailand	Võ Quốc Hưng; Vietnam	Reinaldy Atmanegara; Indonesia
Finweight; 54 kg	Ramnarong Sawekwiharee; Thailand	Võ Quốc Hưng; Vietnam	Zaw Lin Htet; Myanmar
Flyweight; 58 kg	Tawin Hanprab; Thailand	Iskandar Zulkanain Ahmad; Malaysia	Nilton Lemos; Timor-Leste
Flyweight; 58 kg	Tawin Hanprab; Thailand	Iskandar Zulkanain Ahmad; Malaysia	Sandong Xayakoummane; Laos
Bantamweight; 63 kg	Ibrahim Zarman; Indonesia	Nguyễn Văn Duy; Vietnam	Francis Aaron Agojo; Philippines
Bantamweight; 63 kg	Ibrahim Zarman; Indonesia	Nguyễn Văn Duy; Vietnam	Lee Yen Feng; Malaysia
Featherweight; 68 kg	Rozaimi Rozali; Malaysia	Arven Alcantara; Philippines	Nutthawee Klompong; Thailand
Featherweight; 68 kg	Rozaimi Rozali; Malaysia	Arven Alcantara; Philippines	Sorphabmixay Sithikon; Laos
Lightweight; 74 kg	Samuel Morrison; Philippines	Dinggo Ardian Prayogo; Indonesia	Thinagaran Naidu Papunaidu; Malaysia
Lightweight; 74 kg	Samuel Morrison; Philippines	Dinggo Ardian Prayogo; Indonesia	Lý Hồng Phúc; Vietnam

==== Women ====
Event	Gold	Silver	Bronze
Finweight; 46 kg	Julanan Khantikulanon; Thailand	Trương Thị Kim Tuyền; Vietnam	Sonia Martins Soares; Timor-Leste
Finweight; 46 kg	Julanan Khantikulanon; Thailand	Trương Thị Kim Tuyền; Vietnam	Dhean Titania Fazrin; Indonesia
Flyweight; 49 kg	Panipak Wongpattanakit; Thailand	Nur Dhia Liyana Shaharuddin; Malaysia	Ana Da Costa; Timor-Leste
Flyweight; 49 kg	Panipak Wongpattanakit; Thailand	Nur Dhia Liyana Shaharuddin; Malaysia	Dha Ysi Oo Julios; Myanmar
Bantamweight; 53 kg	Mariska Halinda; Indonesia	Rhezie Canama Aragon; Philippines	Jasmin Nabilla Sukardi; Malaysia
Featherweight; 57 kg	Benjarat Yangtrakul; Thailand	Phạm Thị Thu Hiền; Vietnam	Casandre Nicole Tubbs; Cambodia
Featherweight; 57 kg	Benjarat Yangtrakul; Thailand	Phạm Thị Thu Hiền; Vietnam	Souksamay Phenkhamong; Laos
Lightweight; 62 kg	Hà Thị Nguyên; Vietnam	Shaleha Fitriana Yusuf; Indonesia	Nur Intan Zulaikha Firdaus; Malaysia
Lightweight; 62 kg	Hà Thị Nguyên; Vietnam	Shaleha Fitriana Yusuf; Indonesia	Pauline Louise Lopez; Philippines
Middleweight; 73 kg	Sorn Seavmey; Cambodia	Kirstie Elaine Alora; Philippines	Nurul Nur Hafizzah Mahdi; Malaysia
Middleweight; 73 kg	Sorn Seavmey; Cambodia	Kirstie Elaine Alora; Philippines	Sonesavanh Sirimanotham; Laos

== Medal table ==
* Host nation (Malaysia)

Rank	Nation	Gold	Silver	Bronze	Total
1	Thailand	6	1	1	8
2	Malaysia*	3	4	5	12
3	Vietnam	2	4	3	9
4	Indonesia	2	3	4	9
4	Philippines	2	3	4	9
6	Cambodia	1	0	2	3
7	Laos	0	1	4	5
8	Myanmar	0	0	4	4
9	Timor-Leste	0	0	3	3
10	Singapore	0	0	1	1
Totals (10 entries)		16	16	31	63
