= 2016 Asian Taekwondo Championships =

Taekwondo competition

- Venue: Marriott Convention Center
- Location: Pasay, Philippines
- Dates: 18–20 April 2016

Champions
- Men: Iran
- Women: South Korea

The 2016 Asian Taekwondo Championships were the 22nd edition of the Asian Taekwondo Championships, and was scheduled from April 18 to 20, 2016 at the Marriott Convention Center Grand Ballroom in Pasay, Metro Manila, Philippines.

== Medal summary ==
=== Men ===
Event	Gold	Silver	Bronze
Finweight −54 kg	Armin Hadipour; Iran	Ramnarong Sawekwiharee; Thailand	Galymzhan Serikbay; Kazakhstan
Finweight −54 kg	Armin Hadipour; Iran	Ramnarong Sawekwiharee; Thailand	Muatasem Abuzaid; Jordan
Flyweight −58 kg	Mirhashem Hosseini; Iran	Molomyn Tümenbayar; Mongolia	Ibrahim Zarman; Indonesia
Flyweight −58 kg	Mirhashem Hosseini; Iran	Molomyn Tümenbayar; Mongolia	Abdelazeez Mohamed; Qatar
Bantamweight −63 kg	Kim Seok-bae; South Korea	Abolfazl Yaghoubi; Iran	Nutthawee Klompong; Thailand
Bantamweight −63 kg	Kim Seok-bae; South Korea	Abolfazl Yaghoubi; Iran	Zhao Shuai; China
Featherweight −68 kg	Kim Je-yeup; South Korea	Alireza Aliyari; Iran	Naveen; India
Featherweight −68 kg	Kim Je-yeup; South Korea	Alireza Aliyari; Iran	Song Guodong; China
Lightweight −74 kg	Huang Jiannan; China	Nikita Rafalovich; Uzbekistan	Yerzhan Abylkas; Kazakhstan
Lightweight −74 kg	Huang Jiannan; China	Nikita Rafalovich; Uzbekistan	Kim Hun; South Korea
Welterweight −80 kg	Saeid Rajabi; Iran	Liu Wei-ting; Chinese Taipei	Farkhod Negmatov; Tajikistan
Welterweight −80 kg	Saeid Rajabi; Iran	Liu Wei-ting; Chinese Taipei	Saleh El-Sharabaty; Jordan
Middleweight −87 kg	In Kyo-don; South Korea	Smaiyl Duisebay; Kazakhstan	Jasur Baykuziyev; Uzbekistan
Middleweight −87 kg	In Kyo-don; South Korea	Smaiyl Duisebay; Kazakhstan	Anas Sadek; Jordan
Heavyweight +87 kg	Dmitriy Shokin; Uzbekistan	Kristopher Uy; Philippines	Bahri Tanrıkulu; Palestine
Heavyweight +87 kg	Dmitriy Shokin; Uzbekistan	Kristopher Uy; Philippines	Yang Yi; China

=== Women ===
Event	Gold	Silver	Bronze
Finweight −46 kg	Liu Kaiqi; China	Lin Wan-ting; Chinese Taipei	Napaporn Charanawat; Thailand
Finweight −46 kg	Liu Kaiqi; China	Lin Wan-ting; Chinese Taipei	Nahid Kiani; Iran
Flyweight −49 kg	Panipak Wongpattanakit; Thailand	Ha Min-ah; South Korea	Razan Al-Saaideh; Jordan
Flyweight −49 kg	Panipak Wongpattanakit; Thailand	Ha Min-ah; South Korea	Trương Thị Kim Tuyền; Vietnam
Bantamweight −53 kg	Kim Min-jeong; South Korea	Chanatip Sonkham; Thailand	Chhoeung Puthearim; Cambodia
Bantamweight −53 kg	Kim Min-jeong; South Korea	Chanatip Sonkham; Thailand	Taleen Hamaidi; Jordan
Featherweight −57 kg	Pauline Lopez; Philippines	Lee Ah-reum; South Korea	Mahsa Jeddi; Iran
Featherweight −57 kg	Pauline Lopez; Philippines	Lee Ah-reum; South Korea	Shao Fenfen; China
Lightweight −62 kg	Lin Yi-ching; Chinese Taipei	Feng Xiao; Macau	Gulim Bibalayeva; Kazakhstan
Lightweight −62 kg	Lin Yi-ching; Chinese Taipei	Feng Xiao; Macau	Jeon Chae-eun; South Korea
Welterweight −67 kg	Chuang Chia-chia; Chinese Taipei	Hà Thị Nguyên; Vietnam	Feruza Yergeshova; Kazakhstan
Welterweight −67 kg	Chuang Chia-chia; Chinese Taipei	Hà Thị Nguyên; Vietnam	Nigora Tursunkulova; Uzbekistan
Middleweight −73 kg	Lee Da-bin; South Korea	Sorn Seavmey; Cambodia	Zheng Shuyin; China
Middleweight −73 kg	Lee Da-bin; South Korea	Sorn Seavmey; Cambodia	Kirstie Alora; Philippines
Heavyweight +73 kg	An Sae-bom; South Korea	Mokhru Khalimova; Tajikistan	Melika Mirhosseini; Iran
Heavyweight +73 kg	An Sae-bom; South Korea	Mokhru Khalimova; Tajikistan	None awarded

== Medal table ==
Rank	Nation	Gold	Silver	Bronze	Total
1	South Korea	6	2	2	10
2	Iran	3	2	3	8
3	Chinese Taipei	2	2	0	4
4	China	2	0	5	7
5	Thailand	1	2	2	5
6	Uzbekistan	1	1	2	4
7	Philippines	1	1	1	3
8	Kazakhstan	0	1	4	5
9	Cambodia	0	1	1	2
9	Tajikistan	0	1	1	2
9	Vietnam	0	1	1	2
12	Macau	0	1	0	1
12	Mongolia	0	1	0	1
14	Jordan	0	0	5	5
15	India	0	0	1	1
15	Indonesia	0	0	1	1
15	Palestine	0	0	1	1
15	Qatar	0	0	1	1
Totals (18 entries)		16	16	31	63

== Team ranking ==
=== Men ===
Rank	Team	Points
1	Iran	56
2	South Korea	45
3	Uzbekistan	28
4	China	28
5	Kazakhstan	22
6	Chinese Taipei	19
7	Thailand	17
8	Philippines	17
9	Jordan	16
10	Qatar	14

=== Women ===
Rank	Team	Points
1	South Korea	53
2	Chinese Taipei	36
3	Thailand	28
4	China	27
5	Philippines	22
6	Vietnam	18
7	Iran	14
8	Kazakhstan	14
9	Jordan	12
10	Cambodia	11
