= Jeddi =

Jeddi is a surname. Notable people with the surname include:

- saeed Jeddi (born 1997), programmer
- Amirhossein Jeddi (born 1998), Iranian footballer
- Aya Jeddi (born 1999), Iranian footballer
- Ghafour Jeddi (1945–1980), Iranian military officer
- Jalil Bagheri Jeddi (fl. 2004–2012), Iranian Paralympic athlete
- Mahsa Jeddi (born 1988), Iranian taekwondo athlete
