= Taekwondo at the 2014 Asian Games – Women's 67 kg =

Taekwondo competition

Women's 67 kg at the 2014 Asian Games
- Venue: Ganghwa Dolmens Gymnasium
- Date: 2 October 2014
- Competitors: 13 from 13 nations

Medalists
gold medal	Guo Yunfei	China
silver medal	Lee Won-jin	South Korea
bronze medal	Hà Thị Nguyên	Vietnam
bronze medal	Liu Qing	Macau

The women's welterweight (67 kilograms) event at the 2014 Asian Games took place on 2 October 2014 at Ganghwa Dolmens Gymnasium, Incheon, South Korea.

A total of thirteen competitors from thirteen countries competed in this event, limited to fighters whose body weight was less than 67 kilograms.

Guo Yunfei of China defended her 2010 title and won the gold medal after beating Lee Won-jin of South Korea in the gold medal match by the score of 2–1.

The bronze medal was shared by Liu Qing of Macau and Hà Thị Nguyên from Vietnam. Liu Qing won Macau's first ever taekwondo medal at the Asian Games.

== Schedule ==
All times are Korea Standard Time (UTC+09:00)

Date	Time	Event
Thursday, 2 October 2014	09:30	Round of 16
Thursday, 2 October 2014	15:30	Quarterfinals
Thursday, 2 October 2014	15:30	Semifinals
Thursday, 2 October 2014	18:00	Final

== Results ==
Round of 16
Shakhlo Khakimova (UZB)	1
Hà Thị Nguyên (VIE)	4
Julyana Al-Sadeq (JOR)	24
Asia Batool (PAK)	4
Shreya Singh (IND)	6
Lee Won-jin (KOR)	7
Liu Qing (MAC)	9
Ayasha Shakya (NEP)	2
Guo Yunfei (CHN)	8
Gulim Bibalayeva (KAZ)	2

Quarterfinals
Chen Yann-yeu (TPE)	5
Hà Thị Nguyên (VIE)	6
Julyana Al-Sadeq (JOR)	0
Lee Won-jin (KOR)	2
Shokraneh Izadi (IRI)	7
Liu Qing (MAC)	8
Guo Yunfei (CHN)	5
Jane Narra (PHI)	0

Semifinals
Hà Thị Nguyên (VIE)	2
Lee Won-jin (KOR)	5
Liu Qing (MAC)	5
Guo Yunfei (CHN)	6

Final
Lee Won-jin (KOR)	1
Guo Yunfei (CHN)	2
