= Kim Jan-di =

Kim Jan-di may refer to:

- Kim Jan-di (judoka) (born 1991), South Korean judoka
- Kim Jan-di (taekwondo) (born 1995), South Korean taekwondo practitioner
