= Umida Abdullaeva =

Uzbekistani taekwondo practitioner

Personal information
- Born: 12 July 1997 (age 28)

Sport
- Country: Uzbekistan
- Sport: Taekwondo
Medal record
Representing Uzbekistan
Islamic Solidarity Games
Silver medal – second place	2017 Baku	62 kg
Asian Taekwondo Championships
Gold medal – first place	2014 Tashkent	73 kg
Summer Youth Olympics
Silver medal – second place	2014 Nanjing	+63 kg

Umida Abdullaeva (born 12 July 1997) is an Uzbekistani taekwondo practitioner. She won the silver medal in the women's 62 kg event at the 2017 Islamic Solidarity Games held in Baku, Azerbaijan.

Abdullaeva won the silver medal in the girls' +63 kg event at the 2014 Summer Youth Olympics held in Nanjing, China. In the same year, she also represented Uzbekistan at the 2014 Asian Games in the women's 73 kg event. In this competition, she won her first match against Feruza Yergeshova of Kazakhstan and she was eliminated in her next match by Sorn Seavmey of Cambodia.

In 2017, Abdullaeva competed in the women's 62 kg event at the Asian Indoor and Martial Arts Games held in Ashgabat, Turkmenistan.
