= Julanan Khantikulanon =

Thai taekwondo practitioner

Personal information
- Nationality: Thai

Sport
- Sport: Taekwondo
Medal record
Representing Thailand
Women's taekwondo
World Championships
Bronze medal – third place	2019 Manchester	-46 kg
Asian Championships
Silver medal – second place	2022 Chuncheon	-46 kg
Southeast Asian Games
Gold medal – first place	2017 Kuala Lumpur	-46 kg
Gold medal – first place	2019 Philippines	-46 kg
Gold medal – first place	2023 Cambodia	-46 kg

Julanan Khantikulanon is a Thai taekwondo practitioner.

She won a bronze medal in finweight at the 2019 World Taekwondo Championships, after being defeated by Sim Jae-young in the semifinal.
