= 2017 World Taekwondo Championships – Women's finweight =

Taekwondo competition

Women's finweight at the 2017 World Championships
- Venue: Taekwondowon
- Dates: 24–25 June 2017
- Competitors: 49 from 48 nations

Medalists
gold medal	Sim Jae-young	South Korea
silver medal	Trương Thị Kim Tuyền	Vietnam
bronze medal	Andrea Ramírez	Colombia
bronze medal	Napaporn Charanawat	Thailand

The women's finweight is a competition featured at the 2017 World Taekwondo Championships, and was held at the Taekwondowon in Muju County, South Korea on June 24 and June 25. Finweights were limited to a maximum of 46 kilograms in body mass.

== Results ==
Legend

- DQ — Won by disqualification
- P — Won by punitive declaration

=== Finals ===
Semifinals		Final
Andrea Ramírez (COL)	6
Sim Jae-young (KOR)	19	Sim Jae-young (KOR)	18
Napaporn Charanawat (THA)	8	Trương Thị Kim Tuyền (VIE)	9
Trương Thị Kim Tuyền (VIE)	9

=== Top half ===
==== Section 1 ====
Round of 64
Varvara Apoikou (GRE)	9
Oumaima Aichouche (MAR)	7
Regina Sakhautdinova (RUS)	17
Angel Jim (HKG)	1
~~Riccy Talbott (HON)~~
Michal Zrihen (ISR)	DQ
Safiye Polat (AZE)	15
Josephine Esuku (NGR)	6
Andrea Ramírez (COL)	8
Shraddha Dixit (IND)	7

Round of 32
Kyriaki Kouttouki (CYP)	12
Varvara Apoikou (GRE)	5
Regina Sakhautdinova (RUS)	16
Michal Zrihen (ISR)	19
Rukiye Yıldırım (TUR)	8
Safiye Polat (AZE)	5
Andrea Ramírez (COL)	6
Dina Pouryounes (WTF)	2

Round of 16
Kyriaki Kouttouki (CYP)	9
Michal Zrihen (ISR)	11
Rukiye Yıldırım (TUR)	9
Andrea Ramírez (COL)	10

Quarterfinals
Michal Zrihen (ISR)	6
Andrea Ramírez (COL)	10

==== Section 2 ====
Round of 64
Brenda Costa Rica (MEX)	8
Karen Cells (PHI)	6
Danielle Wassell (USA)	3
Habiba Mansour (EGY)	7
Amina Namutosi (UGA)	9
Shyu Nai-yun (TPE)	30
Anargul Sabyr (KAZ)	22^{P}
Sherrine Barrows (BOT)	10

Round of 32
Fadia Farhani (TUN)	15
Brenda Costa Rica (MEX)	9
Habiba Mansour (EGY)	7
Katherine Calderón (PER)	7
Irene Laguna (ESP)	9
Shyu Nai-yun (TPE)	10
Anargul Sabyr (KAZ)	2
Sim Jae-young (KOR)	16

Round of 16
Fadia Farhani (TUN)	15
Habiba Mansour (EGY)	3
Shyu Nai-yun (TPE)	4
Sim Jae-young (KOR)	6

Quarterfinals
Fadia Farhani (TUN)	5
Sim Jae-young (KOR)	15

=== Bottom half ===
==== Section 3 ====
Round of 64
Andrea Schnell (SUI)	11
Rejina Karki (NEP)	4
Liu Kaiqi (CHN)	DQ
~~Flore Mbubu (COD)~~
Mariana Perales (BOL)	0
Camila Bezerra (BRA)	18
Sarah Al-Halwani (ITA)	22
Hawa Yousif (SUD)	2

Round of 32
Iryna Romoldanova (UKR)	5
Andrea Schnell (SUI)	7
Liu Kaiqi (CHN)	20
Kim Shae-room (GER)	9
Virginia Dellán (VEN)	6
Camila Bezerra (BRA)	12
Sarah Al-Halwani (ITA)	6
Napaporn Charanawat (THA)	26

Round of 16
Andrea Schnell (SUI)	6
Liu Kaiqi (CHN)	23
Camila Bezerra (BRA)	3
Napaporn Charanawat (THA)	13

Quarterfinals
Liu Kaiqi (CHN)	7
Napaporn Charanawat (THA)	9

==== Section 4 ====
Round of 64
Kimberly Roch (CAO)	8
Dhean Titania Fajrin (INA)	29
Yuna Matsui (JPN)	18
Mönkhtögsiin Suvd-Erdene (MGL)	11
~~Alaa Hossen (SYR)~~
Trương Thị Kim Tuyền (VIE)	DQ
Khady Fall (SEN)	5
Juliet Contreras (AUS)	8

Round of 32
Maryam IsmaÏli (BEL)	2
Dhean Titania Fajrin (INA)	8
Yuna Matsui (JPN)	11
Hajer Mustapha (FRA)	10
Bouma Coulibaly (CIV)	20
Trương Thị Kim Tuyền (VIE)	22
Juliet Contreras (AUS)	9
Yvette Yong (CAN)	29

Round of 16
Dhean Titania Fajrin (INA)	10
Yuna Matsui (JPN)	10
Trương Thị Kim Tuyền (VIE)	21
Yvette Yong (CAN)	20

Quarterfinals
Dhean Titania Fajrin (INA)	13
Trương Thị Kim Tuyền (VIE)	15
