= Tan Xueqin =

Chinese taekwondo practitioner

Personal information
- Nationality: Chinese

Sport
- Sport: Taekwondo
Medal record
Representing China
Women's taekwondo
World Championships
Bronze medal – third place	2019 Manchester	Finweight

Tan Xueqin is a Chinese taekwondo practitioner.

She won a bronze medal in finweight at the 2019 World Taekwondo Championships, after being defeated by Mahla Momenzadeh in the semifinal.
