= Zrihen =

Zrihen is a surname. Notable people with the surname include:

- Michal Zrihen (born 1995), Israeli-Portuguese taekwondo athlete
- Olga Zrihen (born 1953), Moroccan-born Belgian politician
