= Taekwondo at the 2014 Asian Games – Women's 73 kg =

Taekwondo competition

Women's 73 kg at the 2014 Asian Games
- Venue: Ganghwa Dolmens Gymnasium
- Date: 3 October 2014
- Competitors: 11 from 11 nations

Medalists
gold medal	Sorn Seavmey	Cambodia
silver medal	Fatemeh Rouhani	Iran
bronze medal	Abrar Al-Fahad	Kuwait
bronze medal	Kirstie Alora	Philippines

The women's middleweight (73 kilograms) event at the 2014 Asian Games took place on 3 October 2014 at Ganghwa Dolmens Gymnasium, Incheon, South Korea.

A total of eleven competitors from eleven countries competed in this event, limited to fighters whose body weight was less than 73 kilograms.

Sorn Seavmey of Cambodia won the gold medal after beating Fatemeh Rouhani of Iran in gold medal match 7–4, The bronze medal was shared by Abrar Al-Fahad of Kuwait and Kirstie Alora from the Philippines.

Sorn Seavmey made history for her country and won Cambodia's first ever gold medal in its 60-year history of participation at the Asian Games.

== Schedule ==
All times are Korea Standard Time (UTC+09:00)

Date	Time	Event
Friday, 3 October 2014	09:30	Round of 16
Friday, 3 October 2014	15:30	Quarterfinals
Friday, 3 October 2014	15:30	Semifinals
Friday, 3 October 2014	18:00	Final

== Results ==
Round of 16
Nurulain Jaafar (BRU)	3
Najia Rasool (PAK)	2
Rima Ananbeh (JOR)	15
Shraboni Biswas (BAN)	0
Feruza Yergeshova (KAZ)	0
Umida Abdullaeva (UZB)	4

Quarterfinals
Fatemeh Rouhani (IRI)	19
Nurulain Jaafar (BRU)	1
Abrar Al-Fahad (KUW)	3
Shaloo Raikwar (IND)	3
Kirstie Alora (PHI)	3
Rima Ananbeh (JOR)	2
Umida Abdullaeva (UZB)	7
Sorn Seavmey (CAM)	29

Semifinals
Fatemeh Rouhani (IRI)	16
Abrar Al-Fahad (KUW)	3
Kirstie Alora (PHI)	5
Sorn Seavmey (CAM)	6

Final
Fatemeh Rouhani (IRI)	4
Sorn Seavmey (CAM)	7
