= Fatemeh Rouhani =

Iranian taekwondo practitioner

Medal record

Representing Iran

Women's taekwondo

Asian Games
Silver medal – second place	2014 Incheon	73 kg

Asian Championships
Bronze medal – third place	2012 Ho Chi Minh City	67 kg

Islamic Solidarity Games
Gold medal – first place	2013 Palembang	73 kg

Fatemeh Rouhani (Persian: فاطمه روحانی, born 9 April 1993 in Shahrud) is an Iranian taekwondo practitioner.
