= Taekwondo at the 2011 Pan American Games – Women's 67 kg =

Taekwondo – Women's 67 kg at the 2011 Pan American Games
- Venue: CODE II Gymnasium
- Dates: October 17
- Competitors: 13 from 13 nations

Medalists
Gold medal	Melissa Pagnotta	Canada
Silver medal	Paige McPherson	United States
Bronze medal	Katherine Rodríguez	Dominican Republic
Bronze medal	Taimi Castellanos	Cuba

The women's 67 kg competition of the taekwondo events at the 2011 Pan American Games took place on the 17 of October at the CODE II Gymnasium. The defending Pan American Games champion is Karine Sergerie of Canada, while the defending Pan American Championship, champion is Melissa Pagnotta also of Canada.

== Schedule ==
All times are Central Standard Time (UTC-6).

Date	Time	Round
October 17, 2011	11:00	Preliminaries
October 17, 2011	12:30	Quarterfinals
October 17, 2011	17:00	Semifinals
October 17, 2011	18:00	Final

== Results ==
Legend

- PTG — Won by Points Gap
- SUP — Won by Superiority
- OT — Won on over time (Golden Point)

=== Main bracket ===
Preliminary round
Adanys Cordero (VEN)	2
Raphaella Pereira (BRA)	2
Catalina Fierro (CHI)	1
Katherine Rodríguez (DOM)	2
Andrea St.Bernard (GRN)	2
Carolina Acosta (MEX)	11
Katherine Dumar (COL)	11
Veronica Tajes (ARG)	0
Taimi Castellanos (CUB)	10
Katherine Alvarado (CRC)	0

Quarterfinals
Melissa Pagnotta (CAN)	5
Raphaella Pereira (BRA)	4
Katherine Rodríguez (DOM)	3
Carolina Acosta (MEX)	1
Paige McPherson (USA)	16 (SUP)
Katherine Dumar (COL)	2
Taimi Castellanos (CUB)	2
Asuncion Ocasio (PUR)	1

Semifinals
Melissa Pagnotta (CAN)	15
Katherine Rodríguez (DOM)	9
Paige McPherson (USA)	4
Taimi Castellanos (CUB)	1

Gold medal match
Melissa Pagnotta (CAN)	7 (SUP)
Paige McPherson (USA)	6
