= Napaporn Charanawat =

Thai taekwondo practitioner

Personal information
- Nationality: Thai
- Born: 29 March 1999 (age 27)

Sport
- Sport: Taekwondo
Medal record
Representing Thailand
Women's taekwondo
World Championships
Bronze medal – third place	2017 Muju	-46 kg
Asian Championships
Silver medal – second place	2018 Ho Chi Minh City	-46 kg
Bronze medal – third place	2016 Manila	-46 kg
World Junior Championships
Gold medal – first place	2016 Burnaby	-46 kg
Silver medal – second place	2014 Taipei	-46 kg
Asian Junior Championships
Silver medal – second place	2013 Jakarta	-46 kg
Silver medal – second place	2015 Taipei	-44 kg

Napaporn Charanawat (born 29 March 1999) is a Thai taekwondo practitioner.

She won a bronze medal in finweight at the 2017 World Taekwondo Championships. She won a bronze medal at the 2016 Asian Taekwondo Championships, and a silver medal at the 2018 Asian Taekwondo Championships.
