= Milena Titoneli =

Brazilian taekwondo practitioner

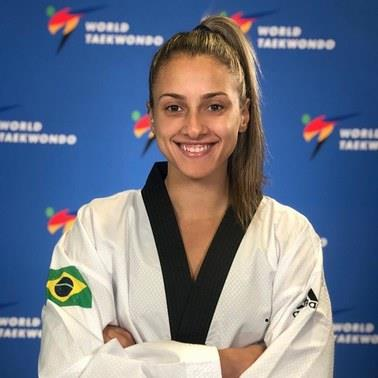

Personal information
- Full name: Milena Titoneli Guimarães
- Born: 6 August 1998 (age 28) São Caetano do Sul, São Paulo, Brazil

Sport
- Sport: Taekwondo
- University team: Anhanguera Educacional
- Club: Two Brothers Team
- Coached by: Clayton dos Santos; Reginaldo dos Santos
Medal record
Women's taekwondo
Representing Brazil
World Championships
Silver medal – second place	2025 Wuxi	67 kg
Bronze medal – third place	2019 Manchester	67 kg
Bronze medal – third place	2022 Guadalajara	67 kg
Pan American Games
Gold medal – first place	2019 Lima	67 kg
Pan American Championships
Gold medal – first place	2021 Cancún	67 kg
Gold medal – first place	2022 Punta Cana	67 kg
Bronze medal – third place	2018 Spokane	67 kg
South American Games
Gold medal – first place	2022 Asunción	67 kg
Gold medal – first place	2026 Santa Fe	67 kg

Milena Titoneli Guimarães (born 6 August 1998) is a Brazilian taekwondo fighter. She won the gold medal in the women's 67 kg event at the 2019 Pan American Games in Lima, Peru and the 2021 Pan American Taekwondo Championships in Cancún, Mexico. She is also a two-time bronze medalist in this event at the World Taekwondo Championships (2019 and 2022).

== Career ==
Titoneli started fighting competitively in 2012, and two years later was in the 2014 Summer Youth Olympics. She won a bronze medal in welterweight at the 2019 World Taekwondo Championships, after being defeated by Nur Tatar in the semifinal. She won a gold medal at the 2021 Pan American Taekwondo Championships.

Through the Pan American qualifier, Titoneli earned a spot to represent Brazil at the 2020 Summer Olympics. Titoneli won her first match against Julyana Al-Sadeq, and then lost the quarterfinals to eventual gold medalist Matea Jelić. Jelić's semifinal win sent Titoneli to the repechage, where after beating Lauren Lee, she reached the bronze dispute against Ivorian fighter Ruth Gbagbi, bronze medalist at the Rio 2016 Games. In spite of a balanced fight for most of the match, Titoneli lost and finished in 4th place.

Titoneli won one of the bronze medals in the women's welterweight event at the 2022 World Taekwondo Championships held in Guadalajara, Mexico. She competed in the women's welterweight event at the 2023 World Taekwondo Championships held in Baku, Azerbaijan.
