= 2018 World Taekwondo Grand Prix =

Taekwondo competition

The 2018 World Taekwondo Grand Prix was the 6th edition of the World Taekwondo Grand Prix series. This was the first season where it was five Grand Prix events.

== Schedule ==
Event	Date	Venue	Ref.
Series 1	June 1–3	Rome, Italy	
Series 2	August 10–12	Moscow, Russia	
Series 3	September 19–21	Taoyuan, Taiwan	
Series 4	October 19–21	(United Kingdom) Manchester, Great Britain	
Final	November 22–23	Fujairah, United Arab Emirates	

== Men ==
=== 58 kg ===
Event	Gold	Silver	Bronze
Rome	Mikhail Artamonov (RUS)	Carlos Navarro (MEX)	Jack Woolley (IRL)
Rome	Mikhail Artamonov (RUS)	Carlos Navarro (MEX)	Kim Tae-hun (KOR)
Moscow	Jang Jun (KOR)	Armin Hadipour (IRI)	Vito Dell'Aquila (ITA)
Moscow	Jang Jun (KOR)	Armin Hadipour (IRI)	Andrei Kanaev (RUS)
Taoyuan	Kim Tae-hun (KOR)	Jesús Tortosa (ESP)	Jang Jun (KOR)
Taoyuan	Kim Tae-hun (KOR)	Jesús Tortosa (ESP)	Mikhail Artamonov (RUS)
Manchester	Armin Hadipour (IRI)	Kim Tae-hun (KOR)	Adrián Vicente (ESP)
Manchester	Armin Hadipour (IRI)	Kim Tae-hun (KOR)	Jesús Tortosa (ESP)
Fujairah	Jang Jun (KOR)	Jesús Tortosa (ESP)	Vito Dell'Aquila (ITA)

=== 68 kg ===
Event	Gold	Silver	Bronze
Rome	Lee Dae-hoon (KOR)	Aleksey Denisenko (RUS)	Huang Yu-jen (TPE)
Rome	Lee Dae-hoon (KOR)	Aleksey Denisenko (RUS)	Bradly Sinden (GBR)
Moscow	Aleksey Denisenko (RUS)	Bradly Sinden (GBR)	Edival Pontes (BRA)
Moscow	Aleksey Denisenko (RUS)	Bradly Sinden (GBR)	Abolfazl Yaghoubi (IRI)
Taoyuan	Lee Dae-hoon (KOR)	Mirhashem Hosseini (IRI)	Edival Pontes (BRA)
Taoyuan	Lee Dae-hoon (KOR)	Mirhashem Hosseini (IRI)	Huang Yu-jen (TPE)
Manchester	Lee Dae-hoon (KOR)	Mirhashem Hosseini (IRI)	Si Mohamed Ketbi (BEL)
Manchester	Lee Dae-hoon (KOR)	Mirhashem Hosseini (IRI)	Bradly Sinden (GBR)
Fujairah	Lee Dae-hoon (KOR)	Kim Seok-bae (KOR)	Lovre Brečić (CRO)

=== 80 kg ===
Event	Gold	Silver	Bronze
Rome	Maksim Khramtsov (RUS)	Raúl Martínez (ESP)	Toni Kanaet (CRO)
Rome	Maksim Khramtsov (RUS)	Raúl Martínez (ESP)	Júlio Ferreira (POR)
Moscow	Maksim Khramtsov (RUS)	Saleh El-Sharabaty (JOR)	Toni Kanaet (CRO)
Moscow	Maksim Khramtsov (RUS)	Saleh El-Sharabaty (JOR)	Nikita Rafalovich (UZB)
Taoyuan	Maksim Khramtsov (RUS)	Cheick Sallah Cissé (CIV)	Damon Sansum (GBR)
Taoyuan	Maksim Khramtsov (RUS)	Cheick Sallah Cissé (CIV)	Seif Eissa (EGY)
Manchester	Raúl Martínez (ESP)	Damon Sansum (GBR)	Seif Eissa (EGY)
Manchester	Raúl Martínez (ESP)	Damon Sansum (GBR)	Nikita Rafalovich (UZB)
Fujairah	Richard Ordemann (NOR)	Maksim Khramtsov (RUS)	Cheick Sallah Cissé (CIV)

=== +80 kg ===
Event	Gold	Silver	Bronze
Rome	Vladislav Larin (RUS)	In Kyo-don (KOR)	Maicon Andrade (BRA)
Rome	Vladislav Larin (RUS)	In Kyo-don (KOR)	Dmitriy Shokin (UZB)
Moscow	In Kyo-don (KOR)	Ivan Trajkovič (SLO)	Anthony Obame (GAB)
Moscow	In Kyo-don (KOR)	Ivan Trajkovič (SLO)	Oleg Kuznetsov (RUS)
Taoyuan	Vladislav Larin (RUS)	Anthony Obame (GAB)	Mahama Cho (GBR)
Taoyuan	Vladislav Larin (RUS)	Anthony Obame (GAB)	Sun Hongyi (CHN)
Manchester	Vladislav Larin (RUS)	In Kyo-don (KOR)	Sajjad Mardani (IRI)
Manchester	Vladislav Larin (RUS)	In Kyo-don (KOR)	Sun Hongyi (CHN)
Fujairah	Vladislav Larin (RUS)	In Kyo-don (KOR)	Sajjad Mardani (IRI)

== Women ==
=== 49 kg ===
Event	Gold	Silver	Bronze
Rome	Kim So-hui (KOR)	Talisca Reis (BRA)	Sim Jae-young (KOR)
Rome	Kim So-hui (KOR)	Talisca Reis (BRA)	Zeliha Ağrıs (TUR)
Moscow	Kim So-hui (KOR)	Kristina Tomić (CRO)	Zeliha Ağrıs (TUR)
Moscow	Kim So-hui (KOR)	Kristina Tomić (CRO)	Sim Jae-young (KOR)
Taoyuan	Panipak Wongpattanakit (THA)	Kim So-hui (KOR)	Kristina Tomić (CRO)
Taoyuan	Panipak Wongpattanakit (THA)	Kim So-hui (KOR)	Rukiye Yıldırım (TUR)
Manchester	Panipak Wongpattanakit (THA)	Sim Jae-young (KOR)	Hung Yu-Ting (TPE)
Manchester	Panipak Wongpattanakit (THA)	Sim Jae-young (KOR)	Miyu Hamada (JPN)
Fujairah	Kim So-hui (KOR)	Panipak Wongpattanakit (THA)	Sim Jae-young (KOR)

=== 57 kg ===
Event	Gold	Silver	Bronze
Rome	Jade Jones (GBR)	Marta Calvo (ESP)	Skylar Park (CAN)
Rome	Jade Jones (GBR)	Marta Calvo (ESP)	Tatiana Kudashova (RUS)
Moscow	İrem Yaman (TUR)	Bruna Vuletić (CRO)	Tatiana Kudashova (RUS)
Moscow	İrem Yaman (TUR)	Bruna Vuletić (CRO)	Hatice Kübra İlgün (TUR)
Taoyuan	İrem Yaman (TUR)	Raheleh Asemani (BEL)	Inese Tarvida (LAT)
Taoyuan	İrem Yaman (TUR)	Raheleh Asemani (BEL)	Luo Zongshi (CHN)
Manchester	Jade Jones (GBR)	Zhou Lijun (CHN)	Skylar Park (CAN)
Manchester	Jade Jones (GBR)	Zhou Lijun (CHN)	Raheleh Asemani (BEL)
Fujairah	Lee Ah-reum (KOR)	Nikita Glasnović (CRO)	Marta Calvo (ESP)

=== 67 kg ===
Event	Gold	Silver	Bronze
Rome	Zhang Mengyu (CHN)	Magda Wiet-Hénin (FRA)	Oh Hye-ri (KOR)
Rome	Zhang Mengyu (CHN)	Magda Wiet-Hénin (FRA)	Lauren Williams (GBR)
Moscow	Matea Jelić (CRO)	Lauren Williams (GBR)	Oh Hye-ri (KOR)
Moscow	Matea Jelić (CRO)	Lauren Williams (GBR)	Julyana Al-Sadeq (JOR)
Taoyuan	Paige McPherson (USA)	Polina Khan (RUS)	Oh Hye-ri (KOR)
Taoyuan	Paige McPherson (USA)	Polina Khan (RUS)	Kim Jan-di (KOR)
Manchester	Lauren Williams (GBR)	Matea Jelić (CRO)	Victoria Heredia (MEX)
Manchester	Lauren Williams (GBR)	Matea Jelić (CRO)	Nur Tatar (TUR)
Fujairah	Nur Tatar (TUR)	Kim Jan-di (KOR)	Matea Jelić (CRO)

=== +67 kg ===
Event	Gold	Silver	Bronze
Rome	Aleksandra Kowalczuk (POL)	Milica Mandić (SRB)	Bianca Walkden (GBR)
Rome	Aleksandra Kowalczuk (POL)	Milica Mandić (SRB)	Lee Da-bin (KOR)
Moscow	Aleksandra Kowalczuk (POL)	Nafia Kuş (TUR)	Zheng Shuyin (CHN)
Moscow	Aleksandra Kowalczuk (POL)	Nafia Kuş (TUR)	Milica Mandić (SRB)
Taoyuan	Lee Da-bin (KOR)	Bianca Walkden (GBR)	Nafia Kuş (TUR)
Taoyuan	Lee Da-bin (KOR)	Bianca Walkden (GBR)	Zheng Shuyin (CHN)
Manchester	Zheng Shuyin (CHN)	Bianca Walkden (GBR)	María del Rosario Espinoza (MEX)
Manchester	Zheng Shuyin (CHN)	Bianca Walkden (GBR)	Gao Pan (CHN)
Fujairah	Zheng Shuyin (CHN)	Bianca Walkden (GBR)	Nafia Kuş (TUR)

== Medal table ==
As of GP Final in Fujairah.

Rank	Nation	Gold	Silver	Bronze	Total
1	South Korea (KOR)	13	8	10	31
2	Russia (RUS)	9	3	5	17
3	Great Britain (GBR)	3	6	6	15
4	Turkey (TUR)	3	1	7	11
5	China (CHN)	3	1	6	10
6	Thailand (THA)	2	1	0	3
7	Poland (POL)	2	0	0	2
8	Croatia (CRO)	1	4	5	10
9	Spain (ESP)	1	4	3	8
10	Iran (IRI)	1	3	3	7
11	Norway (NOR)	1	0	0	1
11	United States (USA)	1	0	0	1
13	Brazil (BRA)	0	1	3	4
14	Belgium (BEL)	0	1	2	3
14	Mexico (MEX)	0	1	2	3
16	Gabon (GAB)	0	1	1	2
16	Ivory Coast (CIV)	0	1	1	2
16	Jordan (JOR)	0	1	1	2
16	Serbia (SRB)	0	1	1	2
20	France (FRA)	0	1	0	1
20	Slovenia (SLO)	0	1	0	1
22	Chinese Taipei (TPE)	0	0	3	3
22	Uzbekistan (UZB)	0	0	3	3
24	Canada (CAN)	0	0	2	2
24	Egypt (EGY)	0	0	2	2
24	Italy (ITA)	0	0	2	2
27	Ireland (IRL)	0	0	1	1
27	Japan (JPN)	0	0	1	1
27	Latvia (LAT)	0	0	1	1
27	Portugal (POR)	0	0	1	1
Totals (30 entries)		40	40	72	152

== See also ==
- List of sporting events in Taiwan
