= Kim Seok-bae =

South Korean taekwondo practitioner

Personal information
- Height: 186 cm (6 ft 1 in)
- Weight: 68 kg (150 lb)

Sport
- Sport: Taekwondo
Medal record
Representing South Korea
Grand Prix
Silver medal – second place	2018 Fujairah	68 kg
Asian Championships
Gold medal – first place	2016 Manila	63 kg
Silver medal – second place	2018 Ho Chi Minh City	68 kg
World Junior Championships
Gold medal – first place	2014 Taipei	59 kg

Kim Seok-bae is a South Korean Taekwondo practitioner. He was the Asian taekwondo champion in 2016 on the under 63 kg (bantamweight) category.
