= 2018 Asian Taekwondo Championships =

Taekwondo competition

- Venue: Phú Thọ Indoor Stadium
- Location: Ho Chi Minh City, Vietnam
- Dates: 26–28 May 2018

Champions
- Men: South Korea
- Women: China

The 2018 Asian Taekwondo Championships were the 23rd edition of the Asian Taekwondo Championships, and was scheduled from May 26 to 28, 2018 in Phú Thọ Indoor Stadium, Ho Chi Minh City, Vietnam.

== Medal summary ==
=== Men ===
Event	Gold	Silver	Bronze
Finweight −54 kg	Jang Jun; South Korea	Ramnarong Sawekwiharee; Thailand	Armin Hadipour; Iran
Finweight −54 kg	Jang Jun; South Korea	Ramnarong Sawekwiharee; Thailand	Aituar Shaikenov; Kazakhstan
Flyweight −58 kg	Kim Tae-hun; South Korea	Farzan Ashourzadeh; Iran	Niyaz Pulatov; Uzbekistan
Flyweight −58 kg	Kim Tae-hun; South Korea	Farzan Ashourzadeh; Iran	Tawin Hanprab; Thailand
Bantamweight −63 kg	Cho Gang-min; South Korea	Soroush Ahmadi; Iran	Molomyn Tümenbayar; Mongolia
Bantamweight −63 kg	Cho Gang-min; South Korea	Soroush Ahmadi; Iran	Sardor Toirov; Uzbekistan
Featherweight −68 kg	Amir Mohammad Bakhshi; Iran	Kim Seok-bae; South Korea	Huang Yu-jen; Chinese Taipei
Featherweight −68 kg	Amir Mohammad Bakhshi; Iran	Kim Seok-bae; South Korea	Shin Dong-yun; South Korea
Lightweight −74 kg	Nikita Rafalovich; Uzbekistan	Mehdi Jalali; Iran	Ren Ke; China
Lightweight −74 kg	Nikita Rafalovich; Uzbekistan	Mehdi Jalali; Iran	Kim Dae-yong; South Korea
Welterweight −80 kg	Chen Linglong; China	Saleh El-Sharabaty; Jordan	Mehdi Khodabakhshi; Iran
Welterweight −80 kg	Chen Linglong; China	Saleh El-Sharabaty; Jordan	Maksim Rafalovich; Uzbekistan
Middleweight −87 kg	Smaiyl Duisebay; Kazakhstan	Jasur Baykuziyev; Uzbekistan	Lee Seung-hwan; South Korea
Middleweight −87 kg	Smaiyl Duisebay; Kazakhstan	Jasur Baykuziyev; Uzbekistan	Ahmad Mohammadi; Iran
Heavyweight +87 kg	In Kyo-don; South Korea	Ruslan Zhaparov; Kazakhstan	Dmitriy Shokin; Uzbekistan
Heavyweight +87 kg	In Kyo-don; South Korea	Ruslan Zhaparov; Kazakhstan	Saeid Rajabi; Iran

=== Women ===
Event	Gold	Silver	Bronze
Finweight −46 kg	Trương Thị Kim Tuyền; Vietnam	Napaporn Charanawat; Thailand	Lee Ye-ji; South Korea
Finweight −46 kg	Trương Thị Kim Tuyền; Vietnam	Napaporn Charanawat; Thailand	Madinabonu Mannopova; Uzbekistan
Flyweight −49 kg	Kang Bo-ra; South Korea	Nahid Kiani; Iran	Hung Yu-ting; Chinese Taipei
Flyweight −49 kg	Kang Bo-ra; South Korea	Nahid Kiani; Iran	Dhean Titania Fajrin; Indonesia
Bantamweight −53 kg	Ha Min-ah; South Korea	Phannapa Harnsujin; Thailand	Mariska Halinda; Indonesia
Bantamweight −53 kg	Ha Min-ah; South Korea	Phannapa Harnsujin; Thailand	Kiyoko Nagano; Japan
Featherweight −57 kg	Zhou Lijun; China	Luo Zongshi; China	Lee Ah-reum; South Korea
Featherweight −57 kg	Zhou Lijun; China	Luo Zongshi; China	Phạm Thị Thu Hiền; Vietnam
Lightweight −62 kg	Zhang Mengyu; China	Lâm Thị Hà Thanh; Vietnam	Kim So-hee; South Korea
Lightweight −62 kg	Zhang Mengyu; China	Lâm Thị Hà Thanh; Vietnam	Kimia Alizadeh; Iran
Welterweight −67 kg	Nigora Tursunkulova; Uzbekistan	Julyana Al-Sadeq; Jordan	Guo Yunfei; China
Welterweight −67 kg	Nigora Tursunkulova; Uzbekistan	Julyana Al-Sadeq; Jordan	Kim Jan-di; South Korea
Middleweight −73 kg	Oh Hye-ri; South Korea	Li Chen; China	Mokhru Khalimova; Tajikistan
Middleweight −73 kg	Oh Hye-ri; South Korea	Li Chen; China	Lee Da-bin; South Korea
Heavyweight +73 kg	Gao Pan; China	Kim Bich-na; South Korea	Zahra Pouresmaeil; Iran
Heavyweight +73 kg	Gao Pan; China	Kim Bich-na; South Korea	Mereke Zhunussova; Kazakhstan

== Medal table ==
Rank	Nation	Gold	Silver	Bronze	Total
1	South Korea	7	2	8	17
2	China	4	2	2	8
3	Uzbekistan	2	1	5	8
4	Iran	1	4	6	11
5	Kazakhstan	1	1	2	4
6	Vietnam	1	1	1	3
7	Thailand	0	3	1	4
8	Jordan	0	2	0	2
9	Chinese Taipei	0	0	2	2
9	Indonesia	0	0	2	2
11	Japan	0	0	1	1
11	Mongolia	0	0	1	1
11	Tajikistan	0	0	1	1
Totals (13 entries)		16	16	32	64

== Team ranking ==
=== Men ===
Rank	Team	Points
1	South Korea	42
2	Iran	37
3	Uzbekistan	32

=== Women ===
Rank	Team	Points
1	China	34
2	South Korea	27
3	Vietnam	26
