= Yun Ji-hye (taekwondo) =

South Korean taekwondo practitioner

Personal information
- Nationality: South Korean
- Born: 5 October 1997 (age 28)
- Height: 159 cm (5 ft 3 in)
- Weight: 51 kg (112 lb)

Sport
- Country: South Korea
- Sport: Taekwondo
- Event: poomsae
Medal record
Women's taekwondo
Representing South Korea
Asian Games
Bronze medal – third place	2018 Jakarta	individual poomsae
Summer Universiade
Gold medal – first place	2017 Taoyuan	Team poomsae
Gold medal – first place	2021 Chengdu	Team poomsae

Korean name
- Hangul: 윤지혜
- RR: Yun Jihye
- MR: Yun Chihye

Yun Ji-hye (born 5 October 1997) is a South Korean female taekwondo practitioner. She represented South Korea at the 2018 Asian Games and claimed a bronze medal jointly with Malaysian Yap Khim Wen in the women's individual poomsae event. This also significantly marked the first medal to be received by South Korea during the 2018 Asian Games.
