= Lauren Lee =

Haitian taekwondo practitioner

Lauren Anna Lee (born 12 February 2004) is an American-born female taekwondo practitioner who has competed for Haiti.

== Career ==
A native of Maple Grove, Minnesota, Lee is the granddaughter of Grandmaster Byung Yul Lee, who helped bring the sport to the United States in 1969. Given her father Eui Young Lee started developing an Olympic taekwondo team for Haiti, after Florida-born Aliyah Shipman, who had won a spot for the 2020 Olympics in the Pan American qualifiers, was blocked from competing by the United States Olympic & Paralympic Committee, Lee was selected to replace her as Haiti's representative. In her first match, in the Round of 16, she lost to the eventual champion Matea Jelić. Since Jelić reached the final, Lee entered the repechage, where she was eliminated in the first match by Milena Titoneli. Lee has since graduated in biology at the University of Minnesota, while her sisters Ava and Jessica remain competing in taekwondo competitions.
