= Taekwondo at the 2018 Asian Games – Women's 67 kg =

Taekwondo competition

Women's 67 kg at the 2018 Asian Games
- Venue: Jakarta Convention Center
- Date: 20 August 2018
- Competitors: 16 from 16 nations

Medalists
gold medal	Julyana Al-Sadeq	Jordan
silver medal	Kim Jan-di	South Korea
bronze medal	Zhang Mengyu	China
bronze medal	Nigora Tursunkulova	Uzbekistan

The women's welterweight (67 kilograms) event at the 2018 Asian Games took place on 20 August 2018 at Jakarta Convention Center Plenary Hall, Jakarta, Indonesia.

A total of sixteen competitors from sixteen countries competed in this event, limited to fighters whose body weight was less than 67 kilograms.

Julyana Al-Sadeq of Jordan won the gold medal to become the first female gold medalists from her country in the history of the Asian Games. She beat Kim Jan-di of South Korea 5–1 in the final.

Top seed Zhang Mengyu from China and Nigora Tursunkulova from Uzbekistan both lost in the semifinal, finished third and won the bronze medal together.

== Schedule ==
All times are Western Indonesia Time (UTC+07:00)

Date	Time	Event
Monday, 20 August 2018	09:00	Round of 16
Monday, 20 August 2018	09:00	Quarterfinals
Monday, 20 August 2018	16:00	Semifinals
Monday, 20 August 2018	16:00	Final

== Results ==
Legend

- R — Won by referee stop contest

Round of 16
Zhang Mengyu (CHN)	10
Chen Yann-yeu (TPE)	8
Sonesavanh Sirimanotham (LAO)	11
Sonam Yangtsho (BHU)	23
Bạc Thị Khiêm (VIE)	8
Melika Mirhosseini (IRI)	23
Nisansala Sandamali (SRI)	0
Julyana Al-Sadeq (JOR)	38^{R}
Kim Jan-di (KOR)	35
Axaule Yerkassimova (KAZ)	9
Sangita Basyel (NEP)	17
Darlene Arpon (PHI)	20
Liu Qing (MAC)	25
Shaleha Fitriana Yusuf (INA)	21
Vincy Lo (HKG)	2
Nigora Tursunkulova (UZB)	22

Quarterfinals
Zhang Mengyu (CHN)	35
Sonam Yangtsho (BHU)	0
Melika Mirhosseini (IRI)	5
Julyana Al-Sadeq (JOR)	21
Kim Jan-di (KOR)	29
Darlene Arpon (PHI)	0
Liu Qing (MAC)	0
Nigora Tursunkulova (UZB)	0

Semifinals
Zhang Mengyu (CHN)	5
Julyana Al-Sadeq (JOR)	14
Kim Jan-di (KOR)	14
Nigora Tursunkulova (UZB)	4

Final
Julyana Al-Sadeq (JOR)	5
Kim Jan-di (KOR)	1
