= Abrar Al-Fahad =

Kuwaiti taekwondo practitioner

Medal record

Representing Kuwait

Women's taekwondo

Asian Games
Bronze medal – third place	2014 Incheon	73 kg

Abrar Al-Fahad (born 3 August 1984) is a Kuwaiti taekwondo practitioner.
