= Mahsa Jeddi =

Iranian taekwondo athlete (born 1998)

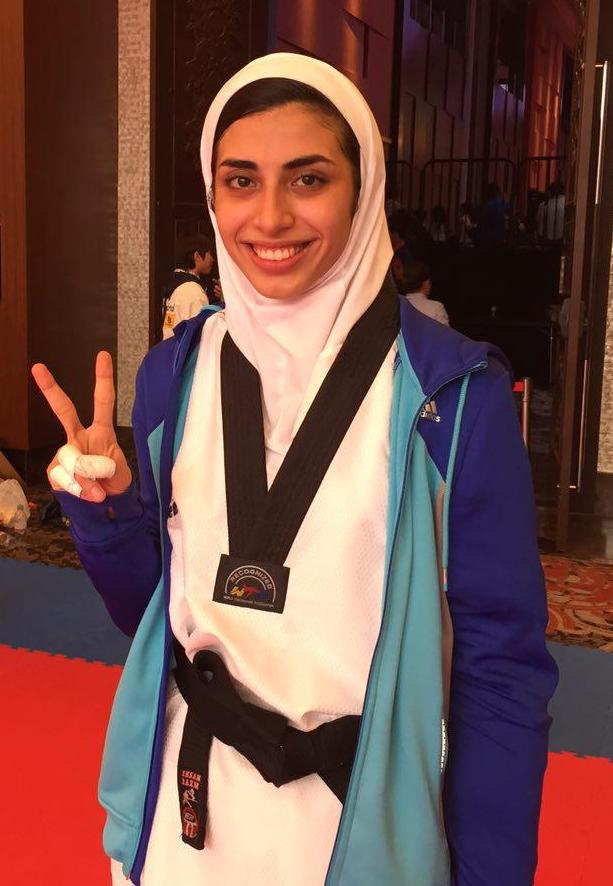

Personal information
- Full name: Mahsa Jeddi
- Born: March 29, 1998 (age 28) Tehran, Iran
- Height: 180 cm (5 ft 11 in)

Sport
- Sport: Taekwondo: Kyorugi
- Coached by: Neda Zare, Mahro Kamrani
Medal record
Representing Iran
Women's Kyorugi
World Youth Championships in Athletics
Bronze medal – third place	Taipei 2014	55 kg
Youth Olympic Selection
Silver medal – second place	Taipei 2014	63 kg
Asian Youth Championships
Bronze medal – third place	Jakarta 2013	55 kg
Gold medal – first place	Taipei 2015	59 kg
Asian Taekwondo Championships
Bronze medal – third place	Sharjah 2016	62 kg
Bronze medal – third place	Manila 2016	57 kg
Jame Fajr Cup
Gold medal – first place	Sari 2017	67 kg

Mahsa Jeddi (born 29 March, 1998 in Tehran) is an Iranian Taekwondo athlete. She won the gold medal in the women's individual Kyorugi (sparring) at the 2015 Asian Games and earned a spot in the Youth Olympic Games by winning a silver medal in the 2014 Olympic selection games.

== Awards and honors ==
- Bronze medal in the Asian Youth Championships in Jakarta in 2013
- Bronze medal in the World Youth Championships in Taipei, China in 2014
- Bronze medal in the Asian Club Championships in Sharjah in 2016
- Bronze medal in the Asian Taekwondo Championships in Manila in 2016
- Gold medal in the Fajr Cup in Sari in 2017
