= Zhang Mengyu =

Chinese Taekwondo practitioner

Personal information
- Nationality: Chinese
- Born: 11 August 1998 (age 27) Huizhou, China
- Height: 180 cm (5 ft 11 in)
- Weight: 62 kg (137 lb)

Sport
- Sport: Taekwondo
- Turned pro: 2015-present
Medal record
Women's taekwondo
Representing China
World Championships
Gold medal – first place	2019 Manchester	67 kg
Bronze medal – third place	2017 Muju	67 kg
Grand Prix
Gold medal – first place	2018 Rome	67 kg
Silver medal – second place	2022 Riyadh (F)	67 kg
Asian Games
Bronze medal – third place	2018 Jakarta	67 kg
Asian Championships
Gold medal – first place	2018 Ho Chi Minh City	62 kg
Military World Games
Gold medal – first place	2015 Mungyeong	57 kg

Zhang Mengyu (born 11 August 1998) is a Chinese taekwondo athlete. She won the bronze medal at the 2017 World Taekwondo Championships on the women's welterweight category.
