= Kim Jan-di (taekwondo) =

South Korean taekwondo practitioner

Personal information
- Nationality: South Korean
- Born: 24 July 1995 (age 30)

Sport
- Sport: Taekwondo
Medal record
Representing South Korea
Women's taekwondo
World Championships
Bronze medal – third place	2017 Muju	Welterweight
Grand Prix
Silver medal – second place	2018 Fujairah (F)	-67 kg
Silver medal – second place	2019 Rome	-67 kg
Bronze medal – third place	2018 Taoyuan	-67 kg
Bronze medal – third place	2022 Rome	-67 kg
Asian Championships
Bronze medal – third place	2018 Ho Chi Minh City	-67 kg
Asian Games
Silver medal – second place	2018 Jakarta	-67 kg

Kim Jan-di (born 24 July 1995) is a South Korean taekwondo practitioner.

She won a bronze medal in welterweight at the 2017 World Taekwondo Championships, after being defeated by Nur Tatar in the semifinal. She won a bronze medal at the 2018 Asian Taekwondo Championships, and a silver medal at the 2018 Asian Games.
