= Trương Thị Kim Tuyền =

Vietnamese taekwondo practitioner

Personal information
- Nationality: Vietnamese
- Born: 2 January 1997 (age 29) Long Hồ, Vĩnh Long Province Vietnam

Sport
- Sport: Taekwondo
Medal record
Representing Vietnam
Women's taekwondo
World Championships
Silver medal – second place	2017 Muju	46 kg
Grand Prix
Silver medal – second place	2017 Rabat	49 kg
Bronze medal – third place	2017 Abidjan	49 kg
Bronze medal – third place	2019 Rome	49 kg
Asian Championships
Gold medal – first place	2018 Ho Chi Minh City	46 kg
Gold medal – first place	2021 Beirut	49 kg
Bronze medal – third place	2016 Manila	49 kg
Bronze medal – third place	2024 Da Nang	49 kg

Trương Thị Kim Tuyền (born 2 January 1997) is a Vietnamese taekwondo practitioner.

She won a silver medal in finweight at the 2017 World Taekwondo Championships, after being defeated by Sim Jae-young in the final. She won a bronze medal at the 2016 Asian Taekwondo Championships, and a gold medal at the 2018 Asian Taekwondo Championships and the 2021 Asian Taekwondo Championships.
