= Mahla Momenzadeh =

Iranian taekwondo athlete and coach

Personal information
- Native name: مهلا مؤمن‌زاده
- Nationality: Iranian
- Born: 15 September 2002 (age 23) Karaj, Iran
- Weight: 46 kg (101 lb)

Sport
- Country: Iran
- Sport: Taekwondo
- Event: Finweight (–46 kg)
Medal record
Event	1st	2nd	3rd
World Championships	–	1	–
Asian Youth Championships	–	1	–
World Cadet Championships	2	–	–
Asian Cadet Championships	1	–	–
World Championships
Silver medal – second place	2019 Manchester	46 kg

Mahla Momenzadeh (Persian: مهلا مؤمن‌زاده, born 15 September 2002 in Karaj) is an Iranian taekwondo athlete and coach. She won a silver medal in the Taekwondo -46 kg weight class at the 2019 World Taekwondo Championships in Manchester.
