= Hà Thị Nguyên =

Vietnamese taekwondo practitioner (born 1990)

Medal record

Representing Vietnam

Women's taekwondo

Asian Games
Bronze medal – third place	2014 Incheon	67 kg

Asian Championships
Silver medal – second place	2014 Tashkent	Welterweight
Silver medal – second place	2016 Manila	Welterweight

Southeast Asian Games
Gold medal – first place	2011 Southeast Asian Games	67 kg - 73 kg
Gold medal – first place	2015 Southeast Asian Games	67 kg
Silver medal – second place	2009 Southeast Asian Games	73 kg

Hà Thị Nguyên (born 4 July 1990) is a Vietnamese taekwondo practitioner.
