= Paige McPherson =

American taekwondo practitioner

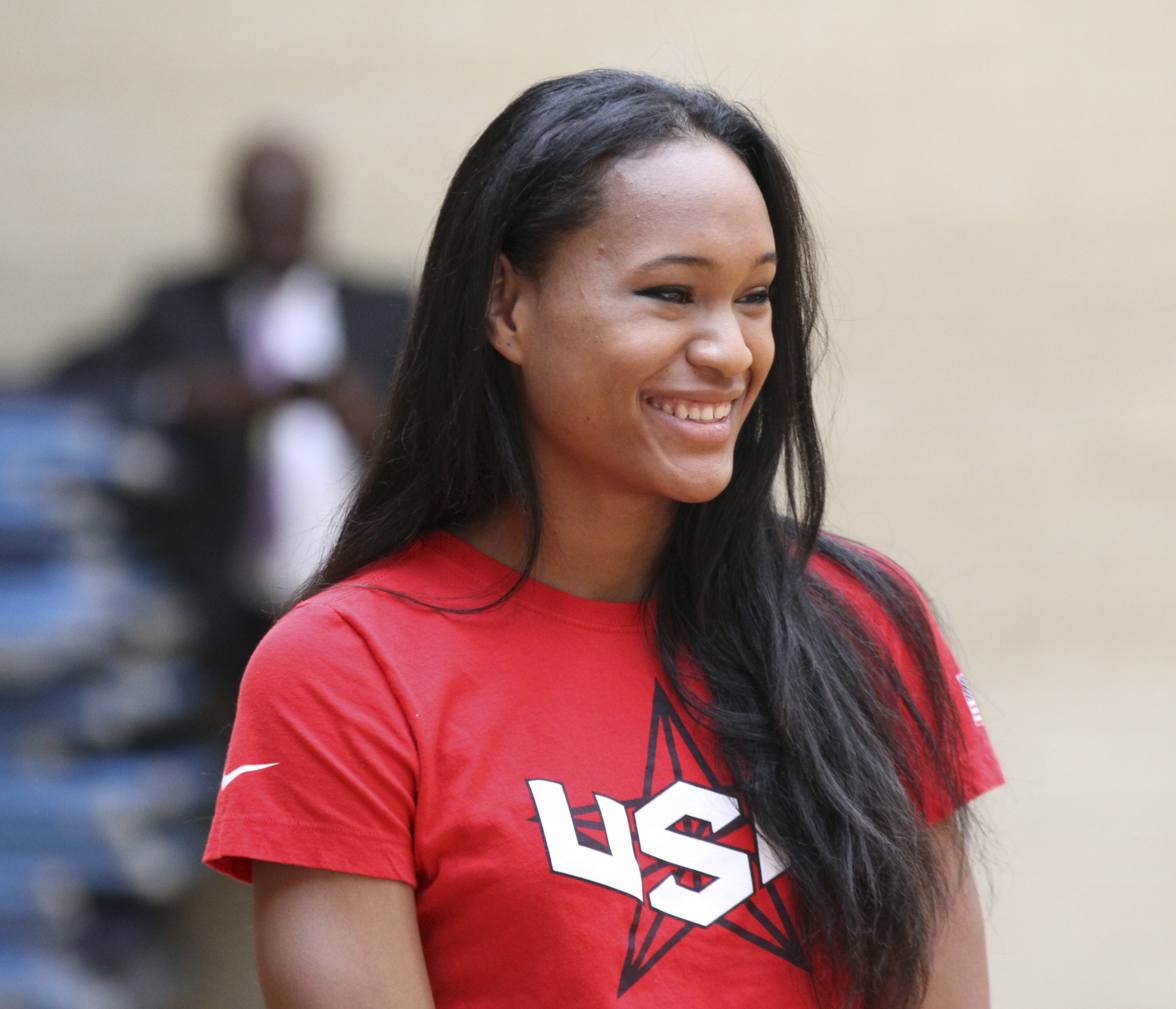
- McPherson in 2012

Personal information
- Born: October 1, 1990 (age 36) Abilene, Texas, U.S.
- Height: 1.73 m (5 ft 8 in)
- Weight: 67 kg (148 lb)

Sport
- Country: United States
- Sport: Taekwondo
- Event: Welterweight (67 kg)
- Coached by: Juan Moreno
Medal record
Women's taekwondo
Representing the United States
Summer Olympics
Bronze medal – third place	2012 London	67 kg
World Championships
Silver medal – second place	2017 Muju	67 kg
Bronze medal – third place	2015 Chelyabinsk	67 kg
Grand Prix
Gold medal – first place	2018 Taoyuan	67 kg
Bronze medal – third place	2017 Moscow	67 kg
Bronze medal – third place	2017 London	67 kg
Pan American Games
Gold medal – first place	2015 Toronto	67 kg
Silver medal – second place	2011 Guadalajara	67 kg
Silver medal – second place	2019 Lima	67 kg
Pan American Championships
Gold medal – first place	2008 Caguas	67 kg
Gold medal – first place	2016 Queretaro	67 kg
Gold medal – first place	2018 Spokane	67 kg
Bronze medal – third place	2014 Aguascalientes	67 kg

Paige Arielle "McFierce" McPherson (born October 1, 1990) is an American taekwondo athlete. A three-time Olympian, she competed for the United States in three different editions of the Summer Olympics (2012, 2016, and 2020). McPherson won the bronze medal in the women's 67 kg event at the 2012 Summer Olympics in London, England.

== Early life ==
McPherson was born on October 1, 1990, in Abilene, Texas. She grew up in Sturgis, South Dakota. McPherson and four other siblings were adopted by Susan and Dave McPherson. Her biological family includes an older brother and two half-siblings. McPherson graduated from Black Hills Classical Christian Academy in 2009, and then went on to attend Miami Dade College.

== Career ==
McPherson was a silver medalist in the women's 67 kg taekwondo event at the 2011 Pan American Games.

McPherson represented the United States at the 2012 Summer Olympics, competing in the women’s 67 kg taekwondo event. In the preliminary round, she secured a surprise defeat over Team GB's Sarah Stevenson. McPherson went on to win a bronze medal by defeating Franka Anić of Slovenia, 8-3.

After winning a gold medal at the 2015 Pan American Games, McPherson was selected to represent the United States as a member of the Team USA Taekwondo Team at the 2016 Summer Olympics in Rio de Janeiro, Brazil. During the 2016 Summer Olympics, she lost her first match against Farida Azizova.

She represented the United States at the 2020 Summer Olympics in Tokyo, Japan, finishing in fifth place in the women's 67 kg event.

== Personal life ==
McPherson is of African American and Filipino descent.
