= Taekwondo at the 2018 Asian Games – Women's team poomsae =

Taekwondo competition

Women's team poomsae at the 2018 Asian Games
- Venue: Jakarta Convention Center
- Date: 19 August 2018
- Competitors: 39 from 13 nations

Medalists
gold medal	Thailand; Kotchawan Chomchuen, Phenkanya Phaisankiattikun, Ornawee Srisahakit
silver medal	South Korea; Gwak Yeo-won, Choi Dong-ah, Park Jae-eun
bronze medal	Philippines; Juvenile Crisostomo, Rinna Babanto, Janna Oliva
bronze medal	Chinese Taipei; Chen Hsiang-ting, Chen Yi-hsuan, Lin Kan-yu

The women's team poomsae event at the 2018 Asian Games took place on 19 August 2018 at Jakarta Convention Center Plenary Hall, Jakarta, Indonesia.

== Schedule ==
All times are Western Indonesia Time (UTC+07:00)

Date	Time	Event
Sunday, 19 August 2018	09:00	Round of 16
Sunday, 19 August 2018	09:00	Quarterfinals
Sunday, 19 August 2018	15:00	Semifinals
Sunday, 19 August 2018	15:00	Final

== Squads ==
China	Chinese Taipei	Hong Kong	India
Ji Yuhan; Wei Mengyue; Liu Yuqing	Chen Hsiang-ting; Chen Yi-hsuan; Lin Kan-yu	Cheung Kar Yue; Wong Ka Yiu; Ng Chiu Ling	Anamika Walia; Mamta Kumari Shah; Shilpa Thapa
Indonesia	Iran	Nepal	Macau
Ruhil; Rachmania Gunawan Putri; Mutiara Habiba	Marjan Salahshouri; Mahsa Sadeghi; Fatemeh Hesam	Sina Maden; Nita Gurung; Parbati Gurung	Wong Chi Cheng; Wong Lei Lei; Chim Cho Kuan
Philippines	South Korea	Thailand	Uzbekistan
Juvenile Crisostomo; Rinna Babanto; Janna Oliva	Gwak Yeo-won; Choi Dong-ah; Park Jae-eun	Kotchawan Chomchuen; Phenkanya Phaisankiattikun; Ornawee Srisahakit	Maftunahon Tolibova; Marina Kim; Sevara Ishmurodova
Vietnam			
Nguyễn Thị Lê Kim; Châu Tuyết Vân; Ngô Thị Thuỳ Dung			

== Results ==
Legend

- WO — Won by walkover

Round of 16
Hong Kong	7.49
Philippines	8.00
China	7.92
Vietnam	7.99
Iran	7.95
South Korea	8.12
Thailand	8.27
India	7.38
Nepal	WO
Uzbekistan

Quarterfinals
Indonesia	8.04
Philippines	8.07
Vietnam	8.13
South Korea	8.24
Macau	7.45
Thailand	8.24
Nepal	7.42
Chinese Taipei	8.19

Semifinals
Philippines	7.11
South Korea	8.02
Thailand	7.95
Chinese Taipei	7.65

Final
South Korea	8.20
Thailand	8.21
