= Taekwondo at the 2018 Asian Games – Women's individual poomsae =

Taekwondo competition

Women's individual poomsae at the 2018 Asian Games
- Venue: Jakarta Convention Center
- Date: 19 August 2018
- Competitors: 16 from 16 nations

Medalists
gold medal	Defia Rosmaniar	Indonesia
silver medal	Marjan Salahshouri	Iran
bronze medal	Yap Khim Wen	Malaysia
bronze medal	Yun Ji-hye	South Korea

The women's individual poomsae event at the 2018 Asian Games took place on 19 August 2018 at Jakarta Convention Center Plenary Hall, Jakarta, Indonesia.

Defia Rosmaniar won Indonesia's first gold medal at the 18th Asian Games in this event. Rosmaniar defeated Marjan Salahshouri of Iran in the women's individual poomsae final to claim a gold medal at the Asian Games in Indonesia. Yap Khim Wen from Malaysia and Yun Ji-hye of South Korea finished third and won the bronze medal.

The poomsae competition was consisted of two patterns in each round. From Preliminary round to quarterfinals two Poomsae was selected randomly from Recognized Poomsae but from semifinals to the final one Poomsae was selected from Recognized Poomsae and one from New Poomsae.

Recognized Poomsae were Koryo, Keumgang, Taeback, Pyongwon and Shipjin. while New Poomsae were Bigak 2, Bigak 3 (Nareusya), Himchari, Saebyeol.

== Schedule ==
All times are Western Indonesia Time (UTC+07:00)

Date	Time	Event
Sunday, 19 August 2018	09:00	Round of 16
Sunday, 19 August 2018	09:00	Quarterfinals
Sunday, 19 August 2018	15:00	Semifinals
Sunday, 19 August 2018	15:00	Final

== Results ==
Round of 16
Ji Yuhan (CHN)	7.99
Phenkanya Phaisankiattikun (THA)	7.95
Yap Khim Wen (MAS)	7.87
Huda Akbar (QAT)	6.95
Chim Cho Kuan (MAC)	7.59
Marjan Salahshouri (IRI)	8.01
Mana Umehara (JPN)	7.68
Kidavone Philavong (LAO)	7.53
Jocel Lyn Ninobla (PHI)	7.89
Châu Tuyết Vân (VIE)	8.11
Defia Rosmaniar (INA)	8.22
Wong Ka Yiu (HKG)	7.69
Liao Wen-hsuan (TPE)	8.10
Parbati Gurung (NEP)	7.54
Sim Rachana (CAM)	7.70
Yun Ji-hye (KOR)	8.31

Quarterfinals
Ji Yuhan (CHN)	8.18
Yap Khim Wen (MAS)	8.20
Marjan Salahshouri (IRI)	8.27
Mana Umehara (JPN)	7.99
Châu Tuyết Vân (VIE)	8.33
Defia Rosmaniar (INA)	8.46
Liao Wen-hsuan (TPE)	8.30
Yun Ji-hye (KOR)	8.52

Semifinals
Yap Khim Wen (MAS)	8.30
Marjan Salahshouri (IRI)	8.43
Defia Rosmaniar (INA)	8.52
Yun Ji-hye (KOR)	8.40

Final
Marjan Salahshouri (IRI)	8.47
Defia Rosmaniar (INA)	8.69
