= Ornawee Srisahakit =

Thai taekwondo practitioner

Personal information
- Nationality: Thai
- Born: 20 June 2000 (age 26) Bangkok, Thailand
- Height: 165 cm (5 ft 5 in)
- Weight: 48 kg (106 lb)

Sport
- Country: Thailand
- Sport: Taekwondo
- Event: poomsae
Medal record
Representing Thailand
Women's poomsae
Asian Games
Gold medal – first place	2018 Jakarta-Palembang	women's team
Poomsae World Championship
Gold medal – first place	2016 Lima	women's team
Southeast Asian Games
Gold medal – first place	2017 Kuala Lumpur	mixed pair
Silver medal – second place	2017 Kuala Lumpur	women's team

Ornawee Srisahakit (born 20 June 2000) is a Thai taekwondo practitioner. She represented Thailand at the 2018 Asian Games and clinched gold medal in the women's team poomsae event along with fellow taekwondo practitioners Kotchawan Chomchuen and Phenkanya Phaisankiattikun defeating favourites South Korea in the final.

In 2016, she jointly with Kotchawan Chomchuen and Ornawee Srisahakit claimed the Poomsae World Championship title in the women's team category for Thailand, which also historically became the first ever Poomsae World Championship title victory for Thailand.
