= 2019 World Taekwondo Championships =

Taekwondo competition

- Venue: Manchester Arena
- Location: Manchester, United Kingdom
- Dates: 15–19 May 2019
- Competitors: 782 from 125 nations

Champions
- Men: South Korea
- Women: South Korea

The 2019 World Taekwondo Championships was the 24th edition of the World Taekwondo Championships and was held at the Manchester Arena, in Manchester, United Kingdom from 15 to 19 May 2019.

== Medal table ==
* Host nation (Great Britain)

Rank	Nation	Gold	Silver	Bronze	Total
1	South Korea	4	1	2	7
2	Great Britain*	3	0	1	4
3	China	2	2	3	7
4	Thailand	2	0	1	3
5	Russia	1	2	1	4
6	Turkey	1	1	2	4
7	Azerbaijan	1	0	1	2
8	Cuba	1	0	0	1
8	Italy	1	0	0	1
10	Mexico	0	3	1	4
11	Brazil	0	2	3	5
12	Iran	0	2	1	3
13	Jordan	0	1	1	2
13	Spain	0	1	1	2
15	Greece	0	1	0	1
16	Croatia	0	0	4	4
17	France	0	0	2	2
18	Argentina	0	0	1	1
18	Belgium	0	0	1	1
18	Canada	0	0	1	1
18	Dominican Republic	0	0	1	1
18	Germany	0	0	1	1
18	Kazakhstan	0	0	1	1
18	Latvia	0	0	1	1
18	Portugal	0	0	1	1
Totals (25 entries)		16	16	32	64

== Medal summary ==
=== Men ===
Event	Gold	Silver	Bronze
Finweight (−54 kg)	Bae Jun-seo; South Korea	Georgy Popov; Russia	Paulo Melo; Brazil
Finweight (−54 kg)	Bae Jun-seo; South Korea	Georgy Popov; Russia	Armin Hadipour; Iran
Flyweight (−58 kg)	Jang Jun; South Korea	Brandon Plaza; Mexico	Rui Bragança; Portugal
Flyweight (−58 kg)	Jang Jun; South Korea	Brandon Plaza; Mexico	Lucas Guzmán; Argentina
Bantamweight (−63 kg)	Zhao Shuai; China	Soroush Ahmadi; Iran	Iordanis Konstantinidis; Germany
Bantamweight (−63 kg)	Zhao Shuai; China	Soroush Ahmadi; Iran	Jaouad Achab; Belgium
Featherweight (−68 kg)	Bradly Sinden; Great Britain	Javier Pérez; Spain	Lee Dae-hoon; South Korea
Featherweight (−68 kg)	Bradly Sinden; Great Britain	Javier Pérez; Spain	Aleksey Denisenko; Russia
Lightweight (−74 kg)	Simone Alessio; Italy	Ahmad Abughaush; Jordan	Daniel Quesada; Spain
Lightweight (−74 kg)	Simone Alessio; Italy	Ahmad Abughaush; Jordan	Kairat Sarymsakov; Kazakhstan
Welterweight (−80 kg)	Milad Beigi; Azerbaijan	Apostolos Telikostoglou; Greece	Moisés Hernández; Dominican Republic
Welterweight (−80 kg)	Milad Beigi; Azerbaijan	Apostolos Telikostoglou; Greece	Park Woo-hyeok; South Korea
Middleweight (−87 kg)	Vladislav Larin; Russia	Ícaro Miguel Soares; Brazil	Song Zhaoxiang; China
Middleweight (−87 kg)	Vladislav Larin; Russia	Ícaro Miguel Soares; Brazil	Ivan Šapina; Croatia
Heavyweight (+87 kg)	Rafael Alba; Cuba	Carlos Sansores; Mexico	Maicon Andrade; Brazil
Heavyweight (+87 kg)	Rafael Alba; Cuba	Carlos Sansores; Mexico	Hamza Kattan; Jordan

=== Women ===
Event	Gold	Silver	Bronze
Finweight (−46 kg)	Sim Jae-young; South Korea	Mahla Momenzadeh; Iran	Tan Xueqin; China
Finweight (−46 kg)	Sim Jae-young; South Korea	Mahla Momenzadeh; Iran	Julanan Khantikulanon; Thailand
Flyweight (−49 kg)	Panipak Wongpattanakit; Thailand	Wu Jingyu; China	Rukiye Yıldırım; Turkey
Flyweight (−49 kg)	Panipak Wongpattanakit; Thailand	Wu Jingyu; China	Kristina Tomić; Croatia
Bantamweight (−53 kg)	Phannapa Harnsujin; Thailand	Tatiana Kudashova; Russia	Aaliyah Powell; Great Britain
Bantamweight (−53 kg)	Phannapa Harnsujin; Thailand	Tatiana Kudashova; Russia	Inese Tarvida; Latvia
Featherweight (−57 kg)	Jade Jones; Great Britain	Lee Ah-reum; South Korea	Skylar Park; Canada
Featherweight (−57 kg)	Jade Jones; Great Britain	Lee Ah-reum; South Korea	Zhou Lijun; China
Lightweight (−62 kg)	İrem Yaman; Turkey	Caroline Santos; Brazil	Magda Wiet-Hénin; France
Lightweight (−62 kg)	İrem Yaman; Turkey	Caroline Santos; Brazil	Bruna Vuletić; Croatia
Welterweight (−67 kg)	Zhang Mengyu; China	Nur Tatar; Turkey	Milena Titoneli; Brazil
Welterweight (−67 kg)	Zhang Mengyu; China	Nur Tatar; Turkey	Farida Azizova; Azerbaijan
Middleweight (−73 kg)	Lee Da-bin; South Korea	María Espinoza; Mexico	Marie-Paule Blé; France
Middleweight (−73 kg)	Lee Da-bin; South Korea	María Espinoza; Mexico	Nafia Kuş; Turkey
Heavyweight (+73 kg)	Bianca Walkden; Great Britain	Zheng Shuyin; China	Briseida Acosta; Mexico
Heavyweight (+73 kg)	Bianca Walkden; Great Britain	Zheng Shuyin; China	Doris Pole; Croatia

== Team ranking ==
=== Men ===
Rank	Team	Points
1	South Korea	315
2	Russia	221
3	China	167
4	Great Britain	149
5	Azerbaijan	148
6	Italy	140
7	Cuba	129
8	Mexico	124
9	Brazil	119
10	Jordan; Spain	99

=== Women ===
Rank	Team	Points
1	South Korea	320
2	China	297
3	Great Britain	289
4	Thailand	280
5	Turkey	240
6	Mexico	96
7	Brazil	94
8	Croatia	88
9	Russia	76
10	Iran	69

== Participating nations ==
A total of 782 athletes from 125 nations and the refugee team (under the name of World Taekwondo) participated.

- Albania (4)
- Andorra (2)
- Argentina (7)
- Australia (11)
- Austria (3)
- Azerbaijan (10)
- Bahrain (2)
- Bangladesh (3)
- Barbados (1)
- Belarus (7)
- Belgium (8)
- Benin (2)
- Bosnia and Herzegovina (3)
- Botswana (1)
- Brazil (16)
- Bulgaria (7)
- Burkina Faso (1)
- Cambodia (2)
- Canada (16)
- Cape Verde (1)
- Central African Republic (1)
- Chile (6)
- China (16)
- Chinese Taipei (16)
- Colombia (14)
- Costa Rica (6)
- Croatia (16)
- Cuba (6)
- Cyprus (14)
- Czech Republic (6)
- Denmark (7)
- Djibouti (1)
- Dominican Republic (5)
- East Timor (2)
- Ecuador (6)
- Egypt (10)
- Estonia (1)
- Eswatini (1)
- Finland (3)
- France (12)
- French Guiana (4)
- Gabon (2)
- Georgia (1)
- Germany (13)
- Great Britain (15)
- Greece (16)
- Guadeloupe (2)
- Guatemala (1)
- Guyana (3)
- Haiti (1)
- Hong Kong (11)
- Hungary (2)
- Iceland (3)
- India (2)
- Indonesia (4)
- Iran (12)
- Iraq (1)
- Ireland (2)
- Israel (6)
- Italy (13)
- Ivory Coast (7)
- Jamaica (1)
- Japan (8)
- Jordan (11)
- Kazakhstan (15)
- Kiribati (1)
- Kosovo (4)
- Kuwait (5)
- Latvia (2)
- Lebanon (10)
- Lesotho (3)
- Lithuania (4)
- Luxembourg (1)
- Macedonia (3)
- Malawi (1)
- Malaysia (2)
- Malta (2)
- Mexico (15)
- Moldova (5)
- Mongolia (2)
- Montenegro (2)
- Morocco (15)
- Mozambique (4)
- Nepal (5)
- Netherlands (4)
- New Zealand (7)
- Nicaragua (1)
- Niger (5)
- Nigeria (1)
- Norway (5)
- Oman (3)
- Pakistan (5)
- Palestine (1)
- Peru (10)
- Philippines (10)
- Poland (9)
- Portugal (10)
- Puerto Rico (12)
- Qatar (2)
- Romania (3)
- Russia (16)
- Rwanda (3)
- San Marino (3)
- Saudi Arabia (6)
- Senegal (6)
- Serbia (14)
- Slovakia (5)
- Slovenia (4)
- Somalia (2)
- South Korea (16)
- Spain (16)
- Sri Lanka (2)
- Sweden (9)
- Switzerland (2)
- Tajikistan (1)
- Thailand (8)
- Trinidad and Tobago (4)
- Tunisia (7)
- Turkey (16)
- Ukraine (15)
- United Arab Emirates (1)
- United States (16)
- Uruguay (2)
- Uzbekistan (12)
- Vietnam (6)
- World Taekwondo (4)
