= Sim Jae-young =

South Korean taekwondo practitioner

Personal information
- Nationality: South Korean
- Born: 14 September 1995 (age 30)
- Weight: 46 kg (101 lb)

Sport
- Sport: Taekwondo
Medal record
Women's taekwondo
Representing South Korea
World Championships
Gold medal – first place	2017 Muju	46 kg
Gold medal – first place	2019 Manchester	46 kg
Grand Prix
Silver medal – second place	2018 Manchester	49 kg
Silver medal – second place	2019 Rome	49 kg
Bronze medal – third place	2017 Rabat	49 kg
Bronze medal – third place	2018 Rome	49 kg
Bronze medal – third place	2018 Moscow	49 kg
Bronze medal – third place	2018 Fujairah (F)	49 kg
Bronze medal – third place	2019 Chiba	49 kg
Bronze medal – third place	2022 Rome	49 kg
- Updated on 11 December 2022

Sim Jae-young (born 14 September 1995) is a South Korean taekwondo athlete. She is the double world champion of the finweight category as she won the championship in 2017 and 2019.

In 2021, she competed in the women's 49 kg event at the 2020 Summer Olympics held in Tokyo, Japan where she was eliminated in her second match.
