= Michal Zrihen =

Portuguese-Israeli taekwondo practitioner (female)

Personal information
- Native name: מיכל זריהן
- Born: 25 March 1995 (age 31) Modi'in-Maccabim-Re'ut, Israel

Sport
- Country: Israel (1995-2021); Portugal (2022-present)
- Sport: Taekwondo
- Event: 46 kg (Finweight)
- Club: Hankuk IS
- Coached by: Jesús Ramal
Medal record
Representing Portugal
European Championships
Bronze medal – third place	2022 Manchester	46 kg
- Updated on 5 July 2022

Michal Zrihen (also spelled Zrihan, Hebrew: מיכל זריהן; born 23 May 1995) is an Israeli-Portuguese taekwondo athlete. She also acquired Portuguese citizenship in 2022, on account of her Sephardi Jewish ancestors, emigrating from Israel in 2021 in order to reside and train in Spain.

== See also ==
- List of Jews in sports#Taekwondo
- Women in Israel
- List of Israelis
- Avishag Semberg
