= Feruza Yergeshova =

Kazakhstani taekwondo practitioner

Feruza Yergeshova (born 17 November 1991 in Shymkent) is a Kazakhstani taekwondo practitioner. She competed in the +67 kg event at the 2012 Summer Olympics and was eliminated by Nusa Rajher in the preliminary round.

In 2014, she represented Kazakhstan at the 2014 Asian Games in the women's 73 kg event. She was eliminated in her first match by Umida Abdullaeva of Uzbekistan.

She participated at the 2009, 2011, 2013, 2015 and 2017 World Championships.
