= Liu Qing (taekwondo) =

Macau taekwondo practitioner

Medal record

Representing Macau

Women's taekwondo

Asian Games
Bronze medal – third place	2014 Incheon	67 kg

Liu Qing (Chinese: 劉情; pinyin: Liú Qíng; born 28 January 1993) is a taekwondo practitioner from Macau.
