= Melissa Pagnotta =

Canadian taekwondo practitioner

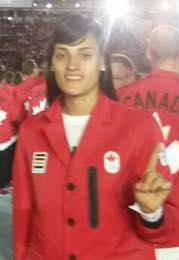

Personal information
- Born: September 22, 1988 (age 37) North York, Ontario, Canada
- Height: 180 cm (5 ft 11 in)
- Weight: 64 kg (141 lb)

Sport
- Country: Canada
- Sport: Taekwondo
Medal record
Women's taekwondo
Representing Canada
Grand Prix
Silver medal – second place	2015 Moscow	67 kg
Pan American Games
Gold medal – first place	2011 Guadalajara	67 kg
Commonwealth Championships
Gold medal – first place	2008 Winnipeg	67 kg
Gold medal – first place	2014 Edinburgh	67 kg
Gold medal – first place	2017 Montreal	67 kg
Pan American Championships
Gold medal – first place	2008 Cagus	63 kg
Gold medal – first place	2010 Monterrey	67 kg
Gold medal – first place	2014 Aguascalientes	67 kg
Bronze medal – third place	2018 Spokane	67 kg
Bronze medal – third place	2021 Cancun	67 kg
Bronze medal – third place	2022 Punta Cana	67 kg
Pan American Junior Championships
Silver medal – second place	2003 Rio de Janeiro	49 kg
Gold medal – first place	2005 Santa Cruz	59 kg

Melissa Pagnotta (born September 22, 1988) is a Canadian taekwondo athlete. She competed for Canada in the women's 67 kg event at the 2016 Summer Olympics in Rio de Janeiro, Brazil, where she was the country's only taekwondo athlete and finished in seventh place. Pagnotta qualified to the 2016 Summer Olympics by winning a silver medal at the 2016 Pan American Taekwondo Olympic Qualification Tournament in Aguascalientes, Mexico. She achieved success at the 2011 Pan American Games in Guadalajara, Mexico, where she won a gold medal in the women's 67 kg event. Pagnotta won a silver medal at the 2015 World Taekwondo Grand Prix in Moscow, Russia, after losing a close, sudden-death match to South Korea's Oh Hye-ri. Her accolades also include three gold medals from the Commonwealth Taekwondo Championships (2008, 2014, 2017) and four from the Pan American Taekwondo Championships (2005, 2008, 2010, 2014).

== Early life ==
Pagnotta was born on September 22, 1988, in North York, Ontario. She began practicing taekwondo at age eight after her father introduced her to a local club, where she grew to enjoy the physical and contact nature of the sport. Pagnotta graduated from Dante Alighieri Academy in Toronto and later attended York University to study kinesiology, but she withdrew after one year to pursue taekwondo full time.

== Personal life ==
Pagnotta is of Italian descent; both of her parents emigrated from Italy.

Pagnotta is one of four siblings; she has an older sister, Rosanne, and two younger brothers, Michael and Adriano.

== Results ==
- 2023 Dominican Open – Silver
- 2022 World Championships (Mexico) – 9th
- 2022 Grand Prix (Manchester) – Top 16
- 2022 Grand Prix (Paris) – Top 32
- 2022 World Taekwondo Presidents Cup (Pan Am) – Bronze
- 2022 Pan American Championships (Dominican Republic) – Bronze
- 2022 Belgium Open – Silver
- 2021 Pan American Championships (Mexico) – Bronze
- 2020 US Open – Bronze
- 2019 Grand Prix Final (Moscow) – Top 16
- 2019 French Open – Gold
- 2019 World Taekwondo Presidents Cup (Pan Am) – Gold
- 2019 Canada Open – Gold (MVP)
- 2019 Grand Prix (Chiba) – Top 32
- 2019 Grand Prix (Rome) – Top 32
- 2019 Pan Am Open – Silver
- 2019 World Championships – 9th
- 2019 US Open – Silver
- 2018 Grand Prix Final (Fujairah) – Top 16
- 2018 Grand Prix 4 (Manchester) – Top 16
- 2018 World Taekwondo Presidents Cup (Pan Am) – Gold (MVP)
- 2018 Canada Open – Silver
- 2018 Pan Am Championships – Bronze
- 2018 Grand Prix 1 (Rome) – Top 32
- 2018 US Open – Silver
- 2017 World Taekwondo Presidents Cup (Pan Am) – Bronze
- 2017 Canada Open – Gold
- 2017 Commonwealth Championships – Gold
- 2017 Costa Rica Open – Silver
- 2017 World Championships – Top 8
- 2016 World Taekwondo Presidents Cup (Pan Am) – Gold
- 2016 Grand Prix Final – Top 8
- 2016 Olympic Games – Top 8
- 2016 Pan Am Open – Gold
- 2016 Pan Am Olympic Qualifier – Silver
- 2016 Mexico Open – Gold
- 2016 German Open – Bronze
- 2016 Spain Open – Gold
- 2015 Pan Am Open – Gold
- 2015 Grand Prix 1 – Silver
- 2015 Grand Prix 2 – Top 16
- 2015 Grand Prix 3 – Top 32
- 2015 World Championships – Top 16
- 2015 Croatia Open – Top 8
- 2015 Morocco Open – Gold
- 2015 Canada Open – Gold
- 2015 US Open – Bronze
- 2014 Pan Am Open – Bronze
- 2014 Turkish Open – Top 8
- 2014 Paris Open – Silver
- 2014 Commonwealth Championships – Gold
- 2014 Grand Prix 3 – Top 32
- 2014 Pan Am Championships – Gold
- 2014 Mexico Open – Silver
- 2014 Grand Prix 2 – Top 32
- 2014 Grand Prix 1 – Top 32
- 2014 US Open – Top 8
- 2014 Canada Open – Silver
- 2013 US Open – Silver
- 2013 Grand Prix Finals – Top 16
- 2013 Canada Open – Top 8
- 2012 Korea Open – Bronze
- 2012 Pan Am Championships – Top 8
- 2012 Canada Open – Top 8
- 2011 World Championships – Top 64
- 2011 Pan Am Games – Gold
- 2011 Korea Open – Bronze
- 2011 US Open – Gold
- 2010 Pan Am Championships – Gold
- 2010 Dutch Open – Top 8
- 2010 US Open – Gold
- 2010 Germany Open – Bronze
- 2009 US Open – Gold
- 2009 Korea Open – Top 8
- 2008 Commonwealth Championships – Gold
- 2008 Pan Am Championships – Gold (MVP)
- 2007 World Championships – Top 32
- 2005 Jr Pan Am Championships – Gold
- 2005 Paris Open – Bronze
- 2004 Jr World Championships – Top 8
- 2003 Jr Pan Am Championships – Silver
- 2002 Jr World Championships – Top 64

Senior:

- 2022 Canadian National – Gold
- 2019 Canadian National – Gold
- 2018 Canadian National – Gold (MVP)
- 2017 Canadian National – Gold
- 2015 Canadian National – Gold
- 2014 Canadian National – Gold
- 2013 Canadian National – Gold
- 2012 Olympic Carding Game – Silver
- 2012 Canadian National – Gold
- 2011 Canadian National Team Trials – Gold
- 2011 Olympic Carding Game – Gold
- 2011 Canadian National – Gold
- 2010 Canadian National Team Trials – Gold
- 2010 Olympic Carding Game – Gold
- 2010 Canadian National – Gold
- 2009 Olympic Carding Game – Gold
- 2009 Canadian National Team Trials – Silver
- 2009 Canadian National – Gold
- 2008 Olympic Carding Game – Silver
- 2008 Canadian National Team Trials – Gold
- 2008 Canadian National – Gold (MVP)
- 2007 Olympic Carding Game – Silver
- 2007 Canadian National Team Trials – Gold
- 2007 Canadian National – Gold
- 2006 Olympic Carding Game – Silver
- 2006 Canadian National – Gold
- 2005 Olympic Carding Game – Silver
- 2005 Canadian National – Bronze
- 2004 Olympic Carding Game – Gold
- 2004 Canadian National – Gold
