= Yap Khim Wen =

Malaysian taekwondo practitioner

Personal information
- Nationality: Malaysian
- Born: 4 September 1994 (age 31) Selangor, Malaysia
- Height: 163 cm (5 ft 4 in)
- Weight: 47 kg (104 lb)

Sport
- Country: Malaysia
- Sport: Taekwondo
- Event: poomsae
Medal record
Representing Malaysia
Women's poomsae
Asian Games
| Bronze medal – third place | 2018 Jakarta | individual |
Southeast Asian Games
| Silver medal – second place | 2015 Singapore | mixed pair |
| Gold medal – first place | 2017 Kuala Lumpur | individual |
| Silver medal – second place | 2017 Kuala Lumpur | mixed pair |

Yap Khim Wen (Chinese: 叶钦文, born 4 September 1994) is a Malaysian taekwondo practitioner. Yap represented Malaysia at the 2018 Asian Games and she claimed a bronze medal in the women's individual poomsae event. This also became the first medal to be earned by Malaysia during the 2018 Asian Games and also marked the first Asian Games taekwondo medal for Malaysia since the 2002 Asian Games.
