= Sorn Seavmey =

Cambodian taekwondo practitioner

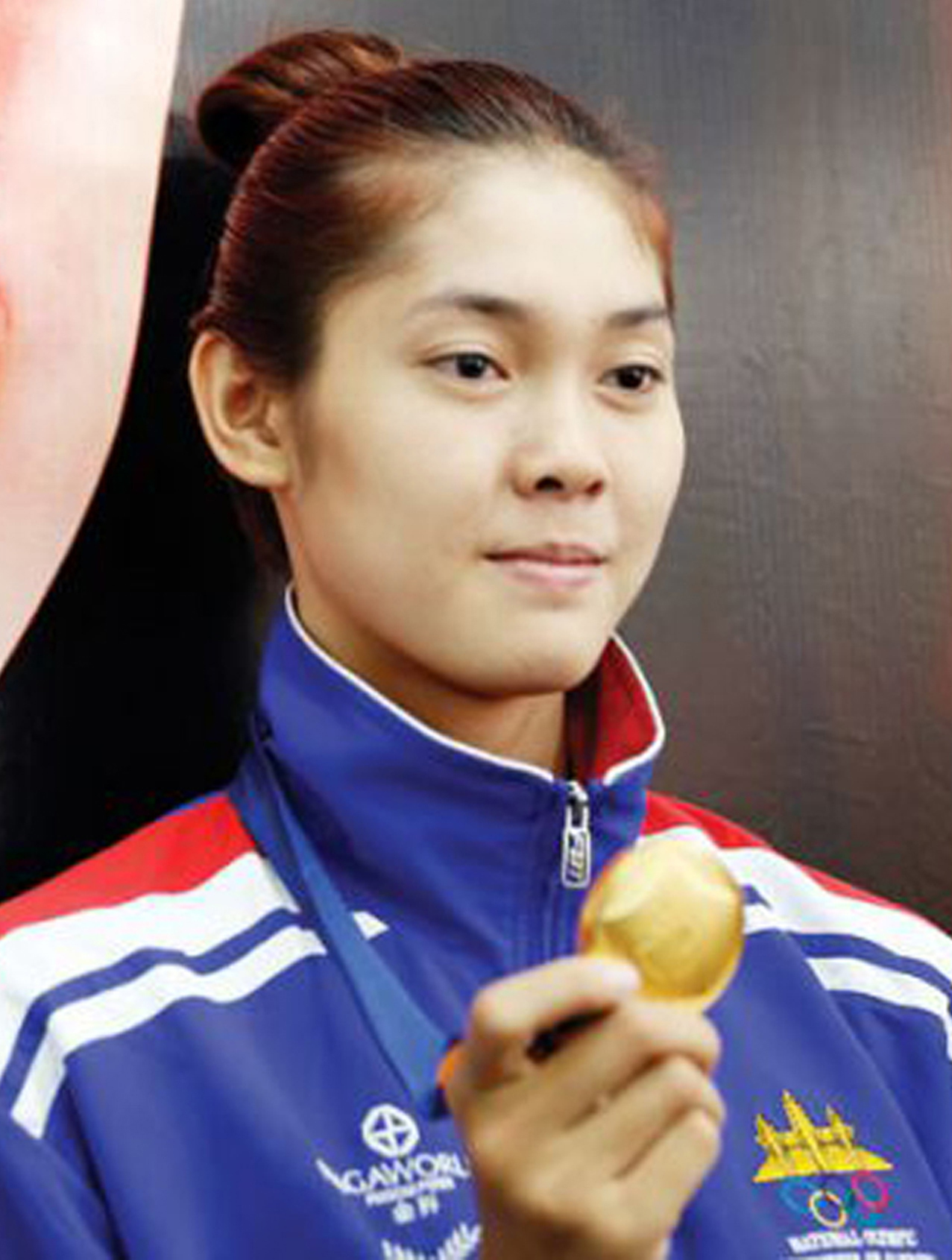

Personal information
- Nationality: Cambodian
- Born: 14 September 1995 (age 30) Phnom Penh, Cambodia
- Height: 183 cm (6 ft 0 in)
- Weight: 73 kg (161 lb)

Sport
- Country: Cambodia
- Sport: Taekwondo
- Event: Middleweight (-73 kg)
Medal record
Representing Cambodia
Women's taekwondo
Asian Games
Gold medal – first place	2014 Incheon	Middleweight
SEA Games
Gold medal – first place	2023 Cambodia	Heavy Weight (73+ kg)
Gold medal – first place	2019 Philippines	Heavy Weight (73+ kg)
Gold medal – first place	2017 Kuala Lumpur	Middle Weight (67–73 kg)
Gold medal – first place	2013 Naypyidaw	Middle Weight (67–73 kg)
Bronze medal – third place	2011 Jakarta	Light Weight (57–62 kg)

Sorn Seavmey (Khmer: ស៊ន សៀវម៉ី; born 14 September 1995) is a Cambodian taekwondo practitioner and gold medalist in the women's under-73 kg event at 2014 Asian Games in Incheon, South Korea. She was also a 2013 SEA Games gold medalist in Myanmar and the 2017 SEA Games in Malaysia. In 2014, she won Cambodia's first gold medal at the Asian Games since its participation in 1954. At the 2014 Incheon Asian Games, Seavmey defeated her first-round opponent from Uzbekistan 29–7, then defeated her Filipino opponent in the semi-final 6–5. In the final round, she defeated her opponent from Iran 7–4, becoming the first Cambodian to win an Asian Games medal. She is 183 cm and trains with her brother Sorn Elit and sister Sorn Davin, who also practice taekwondo.

Seavmey qualified for the 2016 Summer Olympics, where she competed in the women's +67 kg division. She was defeated by Reshmie Oogink of the Netherlands during the round of 16. She was the flag bearer for Cambodia during the Parade of Nations.

She was also the flag bearer for Cambodia at the 2018 Asian Games during the opening ceremony.

In the women's over 73 kg division at the 2023 SEA Games hosted in Cambodia, Sorn Seavmey, secured another gold medal after defeating Sirimanotham Sonesavnh from the Lao People's Democratic Republic with a score of 2–0. This further added to Sorn Seavmey's already impressive list of accomplishments.
