= Nur Tatar =

Turkish taekwondo practitioner

Personal information
- Full name: Nur Tatar Askari
- Nationality: Turkish
- Born: 16 August 1992 (age 34) Van, Turkey
- Height: 1.83 m (6 ft 0 in) (2012)
- Weight: 67 kg (148 lb) (2012)

Sport
- Country: Turkey
- Sport: Taekwondo
- Event: Welterweight (67 kg)
- Club: Ankara İller Bankası
- Coached by: Cüneyt Gülçek
Medal record
Women's taekwondo
Representing Turkey
Olympic Games
Silver medal – second place	2012 London	67 kg
Bronze medal – third place	2016 Rio de Janeiro	67 kg
World Championships
Gold medal – first place	2017 Muju	67 kg
Silver medal – second place	2019 Manchester	67 kg
Silver medal – second place	2015 Chelyabinsk	67 kg
Grand Slam
Silver medal – second place	2017 Wuxi	67 kg
European Championships
Gold medal – first place	2012 Manchester	67 kg
Silver medal – second place	2016 Montreux	67 kg
Silver medal – second place	2010 St. Petersburg	67 kg
Bronze medal – third place	2021 Sofia	67 kg
Bronze medal – third place	2014 Baku	67 kg
European Games
Bronze medal – third place	2015 Baku	67 kg
Mediterranean Games
Gold medal – first place	2013 Mersin	67 kg
Islamic Solidarity Games
Gold medal – first place	2017 Baku	67 kg
Grand Prix
Gold medal – first place	2018 Fujairah	67 kg
Gold medal – first place	2017 Rabat	67 kg
Silver medal – second place	2017 Moscow	67 kg
Silver medal – second place	2015 Mexico City	67 kg
Silver medal – second place	2015 Manchester	67 kg
Bronze medal – third place	2019 Sofia	67 kg
Bronze medal – third place	2018 Manchester	67 kg
Bronze medal – third place	2015 Samsun	67 kg
Bronze medal – third place	2014 Manchester	67 kg

Nur Tatar Askari (born 16 August 1992) is a Turkish female taekwondo practitioner. She is a World and European champion, competing in the feather, light and welterweight divisions. She is of Kurdish descent.

She was a member of the TSE Sports Club in Ankara before she transferred to Ankara İller Bankası. She is coached by Cüneyt Gülçek.

Nur Tatar won her first medal at the age of 15. She won twice the European Junior Taekwondo Championships, and reached to gold medals in A-class tournaments in Europe. She won the silver medal at the 2010 European Taekwondo Championships held in Saint Petersburg, Russia.

She qualified for the 2012 Summer Olympics where she won the silver medal at 67 kg. At the 2013 Mediterranean Games in Mersin, Turkey she became gold medalist. She qualified again for olympics at 2016

She got married in 2017 to a former member of Iranian national taekwondo team Mehran Askari.

== Tournament record ==
Year	Event	Location	G-Rank	Place
2022	Sweden Open	(Sweden) Stockholm	G-1	3rd
2021	European Championships	(Bulgaria) Sofia	G-4	3rd
2020	Fujairah Open	(United Arab Emirates) Fujairah	G-1	1st
2019	World Championships	(United Kingdom) Manchester	G-12	2nd
2019	Grand Prix	(Bulgaria) Sofia	G-4	3rd
2019	Extra European Championships	(Italy) Bari	G-4	3rd
2019	Spanish Open	(Spain) Castellon	G-1	1st
2018	Grand Slam	(China) Wuxi	G-12	2nd
2018	European Championships	(Russia) Kazan	G-4	2nd
2018	Grand Prix	(United Arab Emirates) Fujairah	G-8	1st
2018	Grand Prix	(United Kingdom) Manchester	G-4	3rd
2018	Grand Slam - Qualification	(China) Wuxi	G-4	2nd
2018	Spanish Open	(Spain) Alicante	G-1	1st
2017	World Championships	(South Korea) Muju	G-12	1st
2017	Grand Prix	(Morocco) Rabat	G-4	1st
2017	Grand Prix	(Russia) Moscow	G-4	2nd
2017	Turkish Open	(Turkey) Antalya	G-1	1st
2017	Slovenia Open	(Germany) Hamburg	G-1	1st
2017	WT Presidents Cup - Europe	(Greece) Athen	G-1	3rd
2016	Olympic Games	(Brazil) Rio de Janeiro	G-20	3rd
2016	European Championships	(France) Montreaux	G-4	2nd
2016	European Clubs Championships	(Turkey) Antalya	G-1	1st
2016	Turkish Open	(Turkey) Antalya	G-1	1st
2016	Dutch Open	(Netherlands) Eindhoven	G-1	1st
2016	WT Presidents Cup - Europe	(Germany) Bonn	G-1	3rd
2016	Luxembourg Open	Luxembourg	G-1	3rd
2015	World Championships	(Russia) Chelyabinsk	G-12	2nd
2015	Grand Prix	Mexico City	G-8	2nd
2015	Grand Prix	(United Kingdom) Manchester	G-4	2nd
2015	Grand Prix	(Turkey) Samsun	G-4	3rd
2015	European Games	(Azerbaijan) Baku	G-4	3rd
2015	Universiade	(South Korea) Gwangju	G-2	3rd
2015	Croatia Open	(Croatia) Zagreb	G-1	1st
2015	Ukraine Open	(Ukraine) Kharkiv	G-1	1st
2015	Moldova Open	(Moldova) Chișinău	G-1	2nd
2015	Kazakhstan Open	(Kazakhstan) Almaty	G-1	2nd
2015	European Clubs Championships	(Turkey) Antalya	G-1	3rd
2015	Greece Open	(Greece) Thessaloniki	G-1	3rd
2014	European Championships	(Azerbaijan) Baku	G-4	3rd
2014	Grand Prix	(United Kingdom) Manchester	G-4	3rd
2014	Dutch Open	(Netherlands) Eindhoven	G-1	2nd
2014	Trelleborg Open	(Sweden) Trelleborg	G-1	3rd
2014	Ukraine Open	(Ukraine) Kharkiv	G-1	3rd
2013	Dutch Open	(Netherlands) Eindhoven	G-1	1st
2013	Spanish Open	(Spain) Alicante	G-1	3rd
2012	Olympic Games	(United Kingdom) London	G-20	2nd
2012	European Championships	(United Kingdom) Manchester	G-4	1st
2012	Olympic Games qualification Europe	(Russia) Kazan	G-4	1st
2012	German Open	(Germany) Hamburg	G-1	3rd
2011	German Open	(Germany) Hamburg	G-1	1st
2011	Trelleborg Open	(Sweden) Trelleborg	G-1	3rd
2010	European Championships	(Russia) Saint Petersburg	G-4	2nd
2010	European U-21 Championships	(Ukraine) Kharkiv	G-4	1st
2010	Dutch Open	(Netherlands) Eindhoven	G-1	1st
2009	European U-21 Championships	(Spain) Vigo	G-4	1st
2009	European Junior Championships	(Sweden) Trelleborg	G-4	1st
2009	Spanish Open	(Spain) Alicante	G-1	3rd
2008	Belgian Open	(Belgium) Herentals	G-1	1st
2007	European Junior Championships	(Azerbaijan) Baku	G-1	3rd
