= Nigora Tursunkulova =

Uzbekistani taekwondo practitioner

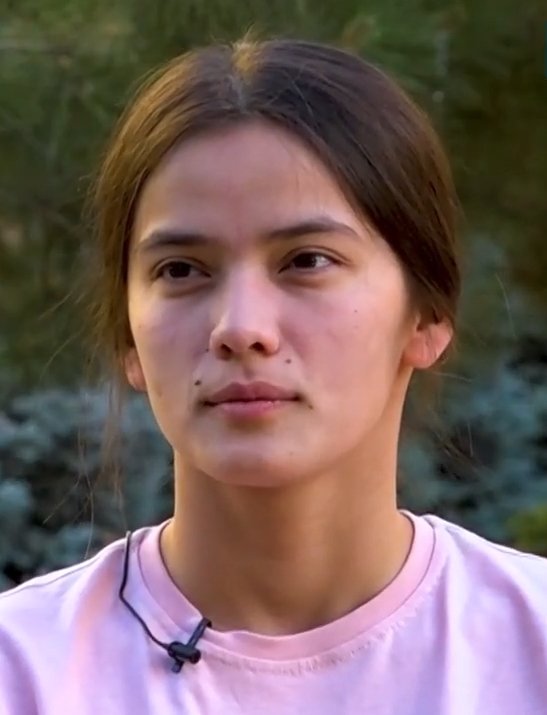
- Nigora Tursunkulova in June 2021

Personal information
- Nationality: Uzbekistani
- Born: 4 April 1999 (age 27) Jizzakh, Uzbekistan

Sport
- Sport: Taekwondo
Medal record
Women's taekwondo
Representing Uzbekistan
Grand Prix
Bronze medal – third place	2019 Chiba	67 kg
Asian Games
Bronze medal – third place	2018 Jakarta	67 kg
Asian Championships
Gold medal – first place	2018 Ho Chi Minh City	67 kg
Bronze medal – third place	2016 Manila	67 kg

Nigora Tursunkulova (born 4 April 1999) is an Uzbekistani taekwondo athlete.

She represented Uzbekistan at the 2016 Summer Olympics in Rio de Janeiro, where she finished tied for ninth in the women's 67 kg, and at the 2020 Summer Olympics in Tokyo where she finished eleventh in the same event. At age 17, she was the youngest competitor at the 2016 taekwondo Olympic tournament.

Tursunkulova was one of the two flag bearers for Uzbekistan, along with boxer Bakhodir Jalolov, in the opening ceremony of the 2020 Summer Olympics.

Summer Olympics
Preceded by Bakhodir Jalolov	Flagbearer for Uzbekistan; Tokyo 2020; With: Bakhodir Jalolov	Succeeded by Incumbent
