= Julyana Al-Sadeq =

Jordanian taekwondo practitioner (born 1994)

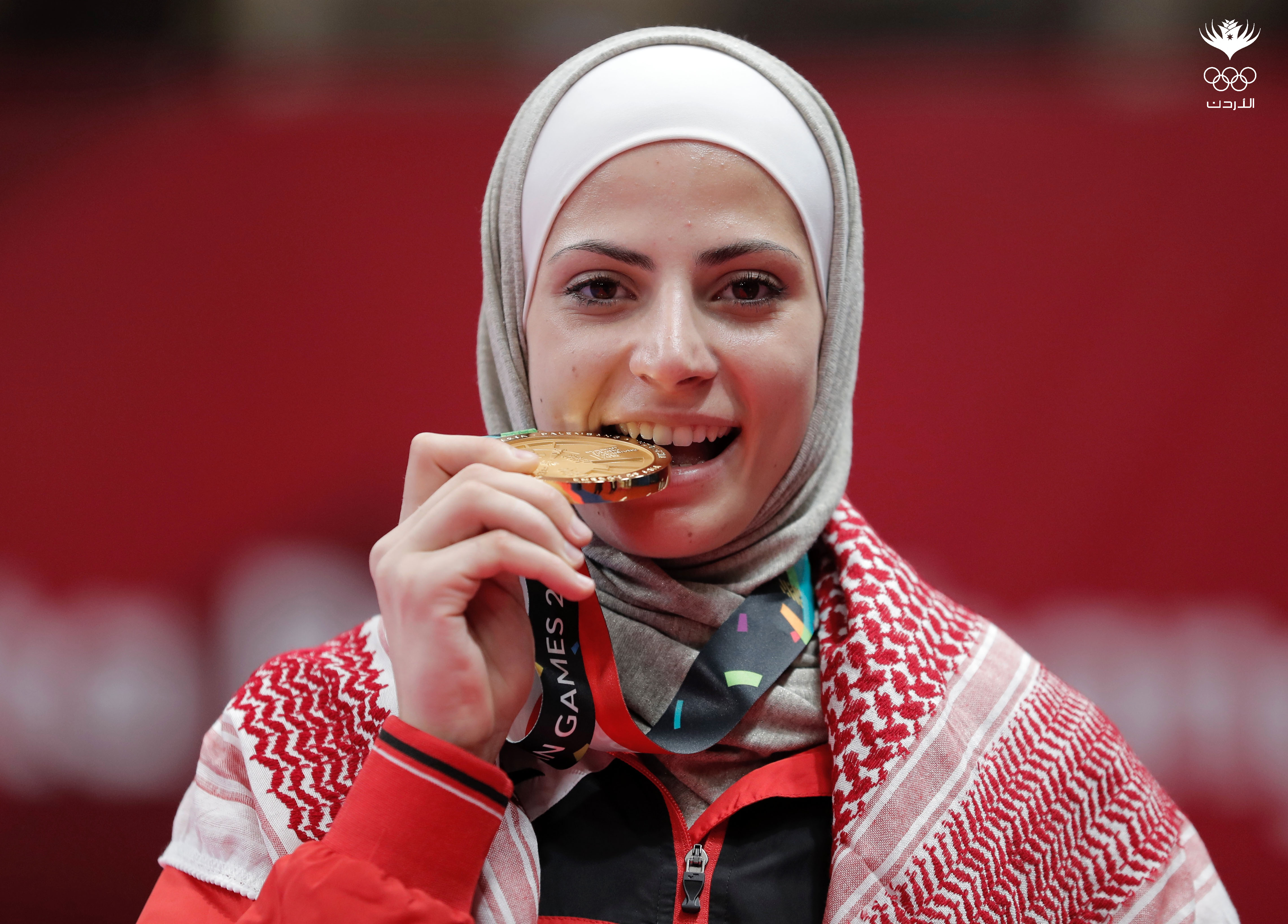
- Julyana Al-Sadeq in 2018

Personal information
- Full name: Julyana Al-Sadeq
- Nationality: Jordanian
- Born: 9 December 1994 (age 31) Amman, Jordan
- Home town: Amman, Jordan
- Height: 172 cm (5 ft 8 in)
- Weight: 67 kg (148 lb)

Sport
- Sport: Taekwondo
- Event: –67 kg
- Team: Jordan
- Coached by: Fares El Asaf
Medal record
Representing Jordan
World Championships
Silver medal – second place	2023 Baku	67 kg
Grand Prix
Gold medal – first place	2022 Riyadh (F)	67 kg
Silver medal – second place	2022 Rome	67 kg
Bronze medal – third place	2018 Moscow	67 kg
Bronze medal – third place	2019 Sofia	67 kg
Asian Games
Gold medal – first place	2018 Jakarta	67 kg
Asian Championships
Gold medal – first place	2021 Dakar	67 kg
Gold medal – first place	2022 Chuncheon	67 kg
Silver medal – second place	2018 Ho Chi Minh City	67 kg
Islamic Solidarity Games
Bronze medal – third place	2013 Palembang	62 kg
- Updated on 12 December 2022

Julyana Al-Sadeq (Arabic: جوليانا الصادق; born 9 December 1994) is a Jordanian taekwondo athlete. She won the gold medal at the 2018 Asian Games on the women's 67 kg weight category. In December 2022, she became the first Jordanian and Arab woman to be ranked world number one following her victory at the Saudi Grand Prix. In December 2024, she announced her retirement from the sport.

== Early life and education ==
Al-Sadeq hails from Amman. She obtained a bachelor's degree in physical education from the University of Jordan.

== Personal life ==
Al-Sadeq has an older brother Yazan Al Sadeq, who had success at the 2010 Youth Olympic Games in Singapore.

In 2021, Al-Sadeq went viral on social media for her perceived resemblance to Lady Gaga.
