= Taekwondo at the 2024 Summer Olympics – Women's 57 kg =

Women's 57 kg at the Games of the XXXIII Olympiad
- Venue: Grand Palais
- Date: 8 August 2024
- Competitors: 16 from 16 nations

Medalists
1st place, gold medalist(s)		Kim Yu-jin	South Korea
2nd place, silver medalist(s)		Nahid Kiani	Iran
3rd place, bronze medalist(s)		Skylar Park	Canada
3rd place, bronze medalist(s)		Kimia Alizadeh	Bulgaria

The women's 57 kg competition in Taekwondo at the 2024 Summer Olympics was held on 8 August 2024 at the Grand Palais.

== Summary ==
This is the seventh appearance of the women's 57kg event.

Anastasija Zolotic failed to qualify, and Tatiana Minina failed to qualify because the IOC did not claim her neutral. Instead, Dominika Hronová took her spot and lost to the eventual bronze medalist Skylar Park. One of the bronze medalists Lo Chia-ling lost to Laetitia Aoun, and Hatice Kübra İlgün lost to eventual champion Kim Yu-jin. Later, Ilgün advanced to repechages losing to Skylar Park.

== Results ==
=== Gold medal match ===
Gold medal match
12	Kim Yu-jin (KOR)	5	9
2	Nahid Kiani (IRI)	1	0

=== Repechage ===
Repechage				Bronze Medal
				11	Laetitia Aoun (LBN)	0	2
				4	Skylar Park (CAN)	0	4
4	Skylar Park (CAN)	6	3	4	Skylar Park (CAN)	0	4
5	Hatice Kübra İlgün (TUR)	4	2

Repechage				Bronze Medal
15	Kimia Alizadeh (BUL)	3	2
10	Chaima Toumi (TUN)	2	2
10	Chaima Toumi (TUN)	2	2	15	Kimia Alizadeh (BUL)	0	0	6
				1	Luo Zongshi (CHN)	0	4	5

=== Main bracket ===
==== Pool A ====
Round of 16
13	Dominika Hronová (CZE)	2	3
4	Skylar Park (CAN)	6	4
5	Hatice Kübra İlgün (TUR)	5	2
12	Kim Yu-jin (KOR)	7	7
9	Stacey Hymer (AUS)	0	0
8	Maria Clara Pacheco (BRA)	5	0
1	Luo Zongshi (CHN)	6	5
16	Emmanuella Atora (GAB)	2	0

Quarter-finals
4	Skylar Park (CAN)	6	5
12	Kim Yu-jin (KOR)	7	9
8	Maria Clara Pacheco (BRA)	1	2	0
1	Luo Zongshi (CHN)	0	3	6

Semi-finals
12	Kim Yu-jin (KOR)	7	1	10
1	Luo Zongshi (CHN)	0	7	3

==== Pool B ====
Round of 16
15	Kimia Alizadeh (BUL)	10	5	7
2	Nahid Kiani (IRI)	7	6	7
7	Faith Dillon (USA)	3	1	2
10	Chaima Toumi (TUN)	0	4	9
11	Laetitia Aoun (LBN)	4	3
6	Lo Chia-ling (TPE)	2	2
3	Jade Jones (GBR)	6	5	1
14	Miljana Reljiḱ (MKD)	7	4	1 (Note: Reljikj progresses on registered hits)

Quarter-finals
2	Nahid Kiani (IRI)	5	0	3
10	Chaima Toumi (TUN)	2	3	2
11	Laetitia Aoun (LBN)	9	6
14	Miljana Reljiḱ (MKD)	8	6

Semi-finals
2	Nahid Kiani (IRI)	10	9
11	Laetitia Aoun (LBN)	3	0

== Kimia Alizadeh vs Nahid Kiani ==
In a rematch of their bout from the 2020 Summer Olympics where Kimia Alizadeh was the victor, Nahid Kiani narrowly defeated Alizadeh in the 2024 bout on 8 August 2024. Alizadeh eventually won bronze and Kiani won the silver medal, the latter being the first for an Iranian woman at the Olympics, surpassing Alizadeh's 2016 bronze feat. While Kiani competed for the Iranian team, Alizadeh competed for the Bulgarian team after having represented the Refugee Olympic Team at the 2020 Summer Olympics, and Iran at the 2016 Summer Olympics where she became the first Iranian female medalist at the Olympics. Alizadeh became Bulgaria's first-ever taekwondo competitor at the Olympics, and won Bulgaria's first medal in Olympic taekwondo. Prior to Alizadeh's defection, the two were friends and training partners.

=== Aftermath ===
IRIB, Iran's state-run broadcaster, censored Alizadeh and the podium celebrations when the two athletes were embracing each other, after having censored the opening ceremony weeks prior as well. During the broadcast, IRIB reporters refused to mention Alizadeh by name and attacked her with nicknames such as "homeless". Alizadeh had defected from Iran years prior to Germany.

Reza Pahlavi, Crown Prince of Iran, wrote that Alizadeh and Kiani are both winners, and called the Iranian Islamic Republic regime the loser of the match. Masih Alinejad lambasted IRIB's censorship and stated the Iranian regime has pitted women against each other.

== See also ==
- Kimia Alizadeh vs Nahid Kiani (Persian Wiki)
