= Taekwondo at the 2020 Summer Olympics – Women's 57 kg =

Taekwondo competition

Women's 57 kg at the Games of the XXXII Olympiad
- Venue: Makuhari Messe
- Date: 25 July 2021
- Competitors: 17 from 17 nations

Medalists
1st place, gold medalist(s)		Anastasija Zolotic	United States
2nd place, silver medalist(s)		Tatiana Minina	ROC
3rd place, bronze medalist(s)		Lo Chia-ling	Chinese Taipei
3rd place, bronze medalist(s)		Hatice Kübra İlgün	Turkey

The women's 57 kg competition in Taekwondo at the 2020 Summer Olympics was held on 25 July 2021, at the Makuhari Messe Hall A.

== Results ==
=== Finals ===
Gold medal
5 Tatiana Minina (ROC)	17
7 Anastasija Zolotic (USA)	25

=== Repechage ===
Repechage
12 Fani Tzeli (GRE)	0
13 Tekiath Ben Yessouf (NIG)	2

Bronze medal
11 Lo Chia-ling (TPE)	10
13 Tekiath Ben Yessouf (NIG)	6

Repechage
10 Nada Laaraj (MAR)	0
2 Hatice Kübra İlgün (TUR)	6

Bronze medal
16 Kimia Alizadeh (EOR)	6
2 Hatice Kübra İlgün (TUR)	8

=== Pool A ===
Qualification round
16 Kimia Alizadeh (EOR)	18
17 Nahid Kiani (IRI)	9

Round of 16
13 Tekiath Ben Yessouf (NIG)	11
4 Mayu Hamada (JPN)	6
5 Tatiana Minina (ROC)	15
12 Fani Tzeli (GRE)	7
9 Patrycja Adamkiewicz (POL)	17
8 Zhou Lijun (CHN)	31
1 Jade Jones (GBR)	12
16 Kimia Alizadeh (EOR)	16

Quarter-finals
13 Tekiath Ben Yessouf (NIG)	10
5 Tatiana Minina (ROC)	15
8 Zhou Lijun (CHN)	8
16 Kimia Alizadeh (EOR)	9

Semi-finals
5 Tatiana Minina (ROC)	10
16 Kimia Alizadeh (EOR)	3

=== Pool B ===
Qualification round

Round of 16
15 Nishy Lee Lindo (CRC)	5
2 Hatice Kübra İlgün (TUR)	16
7 Anastasija Zolotic (USA)	11
10 Nada Laaraj (MAR)	4
11 Lo Chia-ling (TPE)	20
6 Lee Ah-reum (KOR)	18
3 Skylar Park (CAN)	25
14 Stacey Hymer (AUS)	15

Quarter-finals
2 Hatice Kübra İlgün (TUR)	9
7 Anastasija Zolotic (USA)	17
11 Lo Chia-ling (TPE)	18
3 Skylar Park (CAN)	7

Semi-finals
7 Anastasija Zolotic (USA)	28
11 Lo Chia-ling (TPE)	5

== See also ==
- Taekwondo at the 2024 Summer Olympics – Women's 57 kg#Kimia Alizadeh vs Nahid Kiani
