= 2019 World Taekwondo Championships – Women's featherweight =

Women's featherweight at the 2019 World Championships
- Venue: Manchester Arena
- Dates: 17–18 May 2019
- Competitors: 56 from 56 nations

Medalists
| gold medal | Jade Jones | Great Britain |
| silver medal | Lee Ah-reum | South Korea |
| bronze medal | Skylar Park | Canada |
| bronze medal | Zhou Lijun | China |

The women's featherweight is a competition featured at the 2019 World Taekwondo Championships, and was held at the Manchester Arena in Manchester, United Kingdom on 17 and 18 May. Featherweights were limited to a maximum of 57 kilograms in body mass.

== Results ==
Legend

- W — Won by withdrawal

=== Finals ===
| Semifinals | | Final |
| Jade Jones (GBR) | 18 |
| Skylar Park (CAN) | 12 | Jade Jones (GBR) | 14 |
| Zhou Lijun (CHN) | 12 | Lee Ah-reum (KOR) | 7 |
| Lee Ah-reum (KOR) | 15 |

=== Top half ===
==== Section 1 ====
Round of 64
Nishy Lee Lindo (CRC) | 7
Cassie Tubbs (CAM) | 10
Lo Chia-ling (TPE) | 10
Tamara Robles (CUB) | 4
Herma Liz Flores (PUR) | 1
Paulina Armería (MEX) | 17
Jolanta Tarvida (LAT) | 32
Naqsh Hamdani (PAK) | 0
Vanessa Lattimore (NZL) | 3
Bodine Schoenmakers (NED) | 31
Desirae Rolaff (USA) | 4
Parisa Javadi (IRI) | 13

Round of 32
Jade Jones (GBR) | 23
Cassie Tubbs (CAM) | 3
Lo Chia-ling (TPE) | 22
Paulina Armería (MEX) | 6
Jolanta Tarvida (LAT) | 15
Bodine Schoenmakers (NED) | 5
Parisa Javadi (IRI) | 19
Patrycja Adamkiewicz (POL) | 17

Round of 16
Jade Jones (GBR) | 17
Lo Chia-ling (TPE) | 2
Jolanta Tarvida (LAT) | 11
Parisa Javadi (IRI) | 17

Quarterfinals
Jade Jones (GBR) | 30
Parisa Javadi (IRI) | 3

==== Section 2 ====
Round of 64
Vipawan Siripornpermsak (THA) | 9
Fernanda Aguirre (CHI) | 15
Phạm Thị Thu Hiền (VIE) | 18
Gianella Évolo (ARG) | 12
Abrar Bukhari (KSA) | 0
Suvi Mikkonen (FIN) | 30
Klaudija Tvaronavičiūtė (LTU) | 15
Chan Yeuk Yu (HKG) | 2
Yevheniia Zhyla (UKR) | 11
Andriana Asprogeraka (GRE) | 23
Bineta Diédhiou (SEN) | 4
Zariya Kosimova (UZB) | 17

Round of 32
Skylar Park (CAN) | 17
Fernanda Aguirre (CHI) | 7
Phạm Thị Thu Hiền (VIE) | 21
Suvi Mikkonen (FIN) | 35
Klaudija Tvaronavičiūtė (LTU) | 8
Andriana Asprogeraka (GRE) | 3
Zariya Kosimova (UZB) | 5
Nikita Glasnović (CRO) | 8

Round of 16
Skylar Park (CAN) | 41
Suvi Mikkonen (FIN) | 12
Klaudija Tvaronavičiūtė (LTU) | 1
Nikita Glasnović (CRO) | 9

Quarterfinals
Skylar Park (CAN) | 14
Nikita Glasnović (CRO) | 11

=== Bottom half ===
==== Section 3 ====
Round of 64
Elena Evlampyeva (RUS) | 15
Tekiath Ben Yessouf (NIG) | 14
Radwa Reda (EGY) | 5
Emilia Taseva (BUL) | 2
Botakoz Kapanova (KAZ) | 0
Nada Laaraj (MAR) | 20
Aleksandra Radmilović (SRB) | 5
Kasumi Hirabayashi (JPN) | 7
Mell Mina (ECU) | 13
Stacey Hymer (AUS) | 20
Louise Christensen (DEN) | 13
Jennifer Ågren (SWE) | 19

Round of 32
Hatice Kübra İlgün (TUR) | 9
Elena Evlampyeva (RUS) | 10
Radwa Reda (EGY) | 0
Nada Laaraj (MAR) | 1
Kasumi Hirabayashi (JPN) | 3
Stacey Hymer (AUS) | 7
Jennifer Ågren (SWE) | 4
Zhou Lijun (CHN) | 12

Round of 16
Elena Evlampyeva (RUS) | 22
Nada Laaraj (MAR) | 4
Stacey Hymer (AUS) | 2
Zhou Lijun (CHN) | 9^{W}

Quarterfinals
Elena Evlampyeva (RUS) | 8
Zhou Lijun (CHN) | 21

==== Section 4 ====
Round of 64
Anna-Maria Antoniou (CYP) | 3
Sandy Macedo (BRA) | 23
Génesis Andújar (DOM) | 22
Michaela Kubíková (CZE) | 2
Neema Gurung (NEP) | 2
Joana Cunha (POR) | 22
Marie Magnus (NOR) | 10
Katherine Toro (COL) | 7
Arlet Ortiz (ESP) | 16
Pauline Lopez (PHI) | 20
Aittana Moya (PER) | 10
Tatiana Timbalari (MDA) | 26

Round of 32
Raheleh Asemani (BEL) | 9
Sandy Macedo (BRA) | 9
Génesis Andújar (DOM) | 7
Joana Cunha (POR) | 12
Marie Magnus (NOR) | 8
Pauline Lopez (PHI) | 7
Tatiana Timbalari (MDA) | 2
Lee Ah-reum (KOR) | 36

Round of 16
Sandy Macedo (BRA) | 9
Joana Cunha (POR) | 7
Marie Magnus (NOR) | 4
Lee Ah-reum (KOR) | 9

Quarterfinals
Sandy Macedo (BRA) | 4
Lee Ah-reum (KOR) | 24
