= Nada Laaraj =

Moroccan taekwondo practitioner

Personal information
- Native name: ندى لعرج
- Born: 2 September 2000 (age 25) Nador, Morocco

Sport
- Country: Morocco
- Sport: Taekwondo
- Weight class: 57 kg
Medal record
Women's taekwondo
Representing Morocco
Grand Prix
Silver medal – second place	2019 Chiba	57 kg
Bronze medal – third place	2022 Paris	57 kg
African Championships
Gold medal – first place	2018 Agadir	57 kg
Gold medal – first place	2022 Kigali	57 kg
Silver medal – second place	2021 Dakar	57 kg
African Games
Gold medal – first place	2019 Rabat	57 kg
Mediterranean Games
Bronze medal – third place	2026 Taranto	67 kg
Islamic Solidarity Games
Gold medal – first place	2021 Konya	57 kg
Gold medal – first place	2025 Riyadh	63 kg
Bronze medal – third place	2017 Baku	57 kg

Nada Laaraj (Arabic: ندى لعرج, born 2 September 2000) is a Moroccan taekwondo practitioner. She has won gold medals in the women's 57 kg event at the African Games, the Islamic Solidarity Games and the African Taekwondo Championships. She also represented Morocco at the 2020 Summer Olympics in Tokyo, Japan.

== Career ==
In May 2017, she won one of the bronze medals in the women's 57 kg event at the 2017 Islamic Solidarity Games held in Baku, Azerbaijan. The following month, she competed in the women's featherweight event at the 2017 World Taekwondo Championships held in Muju, South Korea where she was eliminated in her second match by Jade Jones of Great Britain. At the 2018 African Taekwondo Championships held in Agadir, Morocco, she won the gold medal in the women's 57 kg event. In that same year, she was eliminated in her first match in the women's 57 kg event at the 2018 Mediterranean Games held in Tarragona, Spain.

In 2019, she competed in the women's featherweight event at the World Taekwondo Championships held in Manchester, United Kingdom. A few months later, she represented Morocco at the 2019 African Games held in Rabat, Morocco and she won the gold medal in the women's 57 kg event. In 2020, she competed in the women's 57 kg event at the African Olympic Qualification Tournament in Rabat, Morocco and she qualified to represent Morocco at the 2020 Summer Olympics in Tokyo, Japan.

At the 2021 African Taekwondo Championships held in Dakar, Senegal, she won the silver medal in the women's 57 kg event. A few months later, she competed in the women's 57 kg event at the 2020 Summer Olympics held in Tokyo, Japan. She lost her first match against Anastasija Zolotic of the United States and she was then eliminated in the repechage by Hatice Kübra İlgün of Turkey.

She competed in the women's 57 kg event at the 2022 Mediterranean Games held in Oran, Algeria. She was eliminated in her first match. She also competed in the women's featherweight event at the 2022 World Taekwondo Championships held in Guadalajara, Mexico.

== Achievements ==
Year	Tournament	Place	Weight class
2017	Islamic Solidarity Games	3rd	57 kg
2018	African Championships	1st	57 kg
2019	African Games	1st	57 kg
2021	African Championships	2nd	57 kg
