= Morocco at the 2020 Summer Olympics =

- IOC code: MAR
- NOC: Moroccan Olympic Committee
- Website: www.cnom.org.ma (in French)

in Tokyo, Japan July 23, 2021 – August 8, 2021
- Competitors: 48 in 17 sports
- Flag bearers (opening): Oumaïma Belahbib; Ramzi Boukhiam
- Flag bearer (closing): Btissam Sadini
- Medals Ranked 63rd: Gold 1 Silver 0 Bronze 0 Total 1

Summer Olympics appearances (overview)
- 1960; 1964; 1968; 1972; 1976; 1980; 1984; 1988; 1992; 1996; 2000; 2004; 2008; 2012; 2016; 2020; 2024

Morocco competed at the 2020 Summer Olympics in Tokyo. Originally scheduled to take place during the summer of 2020, the Games were postponed to 23 July to 8 August 2021, because of the COVID-19 pandemic. The 2020 Games were the nation's fifteenth appearance at the Summer Olympics.

== Medalists ==
Medal	Name	Sport	Event	Date
Gold	Soufiane El Bakkali	Athletics	Men's 3000 metres steeplechase	2 August

== Competitors ==
The following is a list of the number of Moroccan competitors in the Games.

Sport	Men	Women	Total
Athletics	13	3	16
Boxing	4	3	7
Canoeing	1	1	2
Cycling	1	0	1
Equestrian	4	0	4
Fencing	1	0	1
Golf	0	1	1
Judo	0	2	2
Karate	0	1	1
Rowing	0	1	1
Shooting	0	1	1
Surfing	1	0	1
Swimming	1	1	2
Taekwondo	1	2	3
Triathlon	1	0	1
Volleyball	2	0	2
Weightlifting	1	0	1
Wrestling	1	0	1
Total	32	16	48

== Athletics ==
Moroccan athletes achieved the entry standards, either by qualifying time or by world ranking, in the following track and field events (up to a maximum of 3 athletes in each event):

Key

- Note–Ranks given for track events are within the athlete's heat only
- Q = Qualified for the next round
- q = Qualified for the next round as a fastest loser or, in field events, by position without achieving the qualifying target
- NR = National record
- N/A = Round not applicable for the event
- Bye = Athlete not required to compete in round

Track & road events
Men

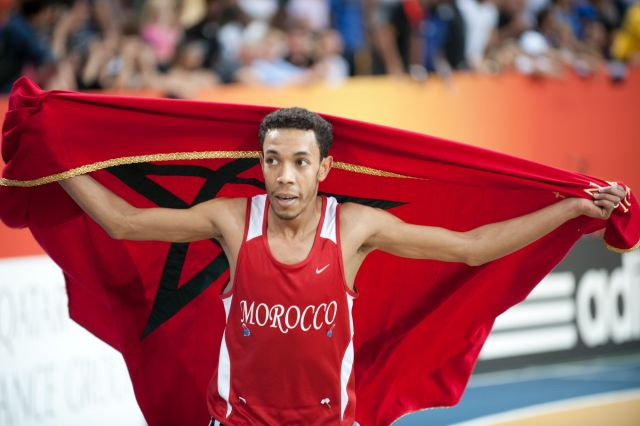
Abdalaati Iguider

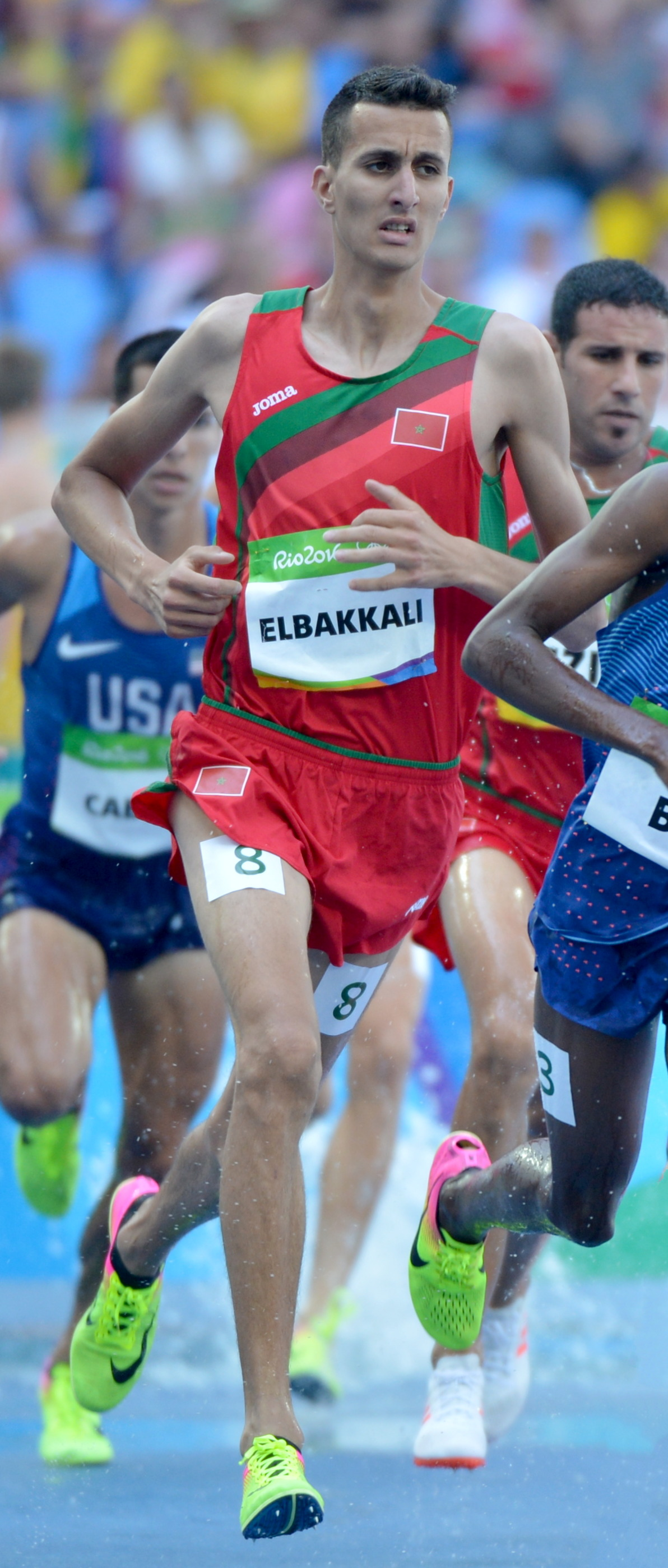
Soufiane El Bakkali

Athlete	Event	Heat		Semifinal		Final	
Athlete	Event	Result	Rank	Result	Rank	Result	Rank
Abdelati El Guesse	800 m	1:44.84 PB	4 q	1:46.85	8	Did not advance	
Oussama Nabil	800 m	1:45.64	5 q	1:46.42	4	Did not advance	
Mostafa Smaili	800 m	1:46.05	4	Did not advance			
Soufiane El Bakkali	1500 m	DNF		Did not advance			
Anass Essayi	1500 m	3:45.92	11	Did not advance			
Abdelatif Sadiki	1500 m	3:36.23	5 Q	3:33.59 PB	8	Did not advance	
Soufiyan Bouqantar	5000 m	13:43.97	12	—N/a		Did not advance	
Abdelkarim Ben Zahra	3000 m steeplechase	8:28.63 SB	10	—N/a		Did not advance	
Soufiane El Bakkali	3000 m steeplechase	8:19.00	1 Q	—N/a		8:08.90	1st place, gold medalist(s)
Mohamed Tindouft	3000 m steeplechase	8:15.91	5 q	—N/a		8:23.56	13
Mohamed Reda El Aaraby	Marathon	—N/a				2:12:22	11
Othmane El Goumri	Marathon	—N/a				2:11:58	9
Hamza Sahli	Marathon	—N/a				2:14:48	18

Women

Athlete	Event	Heat		Semifinal		Final	
Athlete	Event	Result	Rank	Result	Rank	Result	Rank
Rababe Arafi	800 m	2:00.96	3 Q	1:59.86	6	Did not advance	
Rababe Arafi	1500 m	DNF		Did not advance			
Rkia El Moukim	Marathon	—N/a				2:40:10	56

== Boxing ==
Morocco qualified six boxers (three per gender) into the Olympic tournament. Rio 2016 Olympian Khadija El-Mardi, along with five rookies (Baala, Nadir, Assaghir, Cheddar, and Bel Ahbib), secured their spots by advancing to the final match of their respective weight divisions at the 2020 African Qualification Tournament in Diamniadio, Senegal. El-Mardi later withdrew prior to the start of the competition.

Men

Athlete	Event	Round of 32	Round of 16	Quarterfinals	Semifinals	Final	
Athlete	Event	Opposition Result	Opposition Result	Opposition Result	Opposition Result	Opposition Result	Rank
Mohamed Hamout	Featherweight	Shahbakhsh (IRI); L 0–5	Did not advance				
Abdelhaq Nadir	Lightweight	Colin (MRI); L 1–4	Did not advance				
Mohamed Assaghir	Light heavyweight	Khataev (ROC); L RSC	Did not advance				
Youness Baala	Heavyweight	Bye	Nyika (NZL); L 0–5	Did not advance			

Women

Athlete	Event	Round of 32	Round of 16	Quarterfinals	Semifinals	Final	
Athlete	Event	Opposition Result	Opposition Result	Opposition Result	Opposition Result	Opposition Result	Rank
Rabab Cheddar	Flyweight	Davison (GBR); L 0–5	Did not advance				
Oumayma Bel Ahbib	Welterweight	Bye	Lysenko (UKR); L 0–5	Did not advance			
Khadija El-Mardi	Middleweight	Withdrew due to injury					

== Canoeing ==
=== Slalom ===
Moroccan canoeists qualified one boat for each of the following classes through the 2021 African Canoe Slalom Championship in La Seu d'Urgell, Spain.

Athlete	Event	Preliminary						Semifinal		Final	
Athlete	Event	Run 1	Rank	Run 2	Rank	Best	Rank	Time	Rank	Time	Rank
Mathis Soudi	Men's K-1	93.86	7	100.92	19	93.86	15 Q	103.58	18	Did not advance	
Célia Jodar	Women's K-1	171.38	24	258.46	27	171.38	27	Did not advance			

== Cycling ==
=== Road ===
Morocco entered one rider to compete in the men's Olympic road race, by virtue of his top 50 national finish (for men) in the UCI World Ranking.

Athlete	Event	Time	Rank
Mohcine El Kouraji	Men's road race	Did not finish	

== Equestrian ==
Morocco entered one dressage rider into the Olympic equestrian competition, by finishing in the top two, outside the group selection, of the individual FEI Olympic Rankings for Group F (Africa and Middle East). Meanwhile, a squad of three jumping riders was added to the Moroccan roster by accepting a forfeited spot from Qatar, as the next highest-ranked team, not yet qualified, at the International Equestrian Federation (FEI)-designated Olympic qualifier for Group F in Rabat.

=== Dressage ===
Athlete	Horse	Event	Grand Prix		Grand Prix Freestyle		Overall	
Athlete	Horse	Event	Score	Rank	Technical	Artistic	Score	Rank
Yessin Rahmouni	All At Once	Individual	66.599	44	Did not advance			

Qualification Legend: Q = Qualified for the final; q = Qualified for the final as a lucky loser

=== Jumping ===
Samy Colman and Davino Q withdrew before the competition as Colman tested positive to COVID-19 and was replaced by El Ghali Boukaa and Ugolino du Clos. Ali Al-Ahrach's Golden Lady is the reserve horse.

Athlete	Horse	Event	Qualification		Final		
Athlete	Horse	Event	Penalties	Rank	Penalties	Time	Rank
Ali Al-Ahrach	USA de Riverland	Individual	Eliminated		Did not advance		
El Ghali Boukaa	Ugolino du Clos	Individual	14	=60	Did not advance		
Abdelkebir Ouaddar	Istanbull v.h Ooievaarshof	Individual	16	63	Did not advance		
Ali Al-Ahrach; El Ghali Boukaa; Abdelkebir Ouaddar	Golden Lady; Ugolino du Clos; Istanbull v.h Ooievaarshof	Team	37	13	Did not advance		

== Fencing ==
Morocco entered one fencer into the Olympic competition. Houssam El-Kord claimed a spot in the men's épée as the top-ranked fencer vying for qualification from Africa in the FIE Adjusted Official Rankings.

Athlete	Event	Round of 64	Round of 32	Round of 16	Quarterfinal	Semifinal	Final / BM	
Athlete	Event	Opposition Score	Opposition Score	Opposition Score	Opposition Score	Opposition Score	Opposition Score	Rank
Houssam El-Kord	Men's épée	Bye	Wang Zj (CHN); W 15–14	Siklósi (HUN); L 13–15	Did not advance			

== Golf ==
Morocco entered one golfer into the Olympic tournament. Maha Haddioui (world no. 418) qualified directly among the top 60 eligible players for the women's event based on the IGF World Rankings as of 29 July 2021.

Athlete	Event	Round 1	Round 2	Round 3	Round 4	Total		
Athlete	Event	Score	Score	Score	Score	Score	Par	Rank
Maha Haddioui	Women's	72	74	70	69	285	+1	=43

== Judo ==
Morocco qualified two female judoka for each of the following weight classes at the Games. Rio 2016 Olympian Assmaa Niang was selected among the top 18 judoka of the women's middleweight category (70 kg) based on the IJF World Ranking List of June 28, 2021, while rookie Soumiya Iraoui (women's half-lightweight, 52 kg) accepted a continental berth from Africa as the nation's top-ranked judoka outside of direct qualifying position.

Athlete	Event	Round of 32	Round of 16	Quarterfinals	Semifinals	Repechage	Final / BM	
Athlete	Event	Opposition Result	Opposition Result	Opposition Result	Opposition Result	Opposition Result	Opposition Result	Rank
Soumiya Iraoui	Women's –52 kg	Warasiha (THA); W 10–00	Giles (GBR); L 00–10	Did not advance				
Assmaa Niang	Women's –70 kg	Bellandi (ITA); L 00–01	Did not advance					

== Karate ==
Morocco entered one karateka into the inaugural Olympic tournament. Btissam Sadini qualified directly for the women's kumite 61-kg category by topping the final pool round at 2021 World Olympic Qualification Tournament in Paris, France.

Kumite

Athlete	Event	Round robin					Semifinals	Final	
Athlete	Event	Opposition Result	Opposition Result	Opposition Result	Opposition Result	Rank	Opposition Result	Opposition Result	Rank
Btissam Sadini	Women's –61 kg	Preković (SRB); L 1–3	Serogina (UKR); D 1–1	Farouk (EGY); L 0–5	Grande (PER); L 1–3	5	Did not advance		

== Rowing ==
Morocco qualified one boat in the women's single sculls for the Games by finishing fourth in the A-final and securing the second of five berths available at the 2019 FISA African Olympic Qualification Regatta in Tunis, Tunisia, marking the country's debut in the sport.

Athlete	Event	Heats		Repechage		Quarterfinals		Semifinals		Final	
Athlete	Event	Time	Rank	Time	Rank	Time	Rank	Time	Rank	Time	Rank
Sarah Fraincart	Women's single sculls	8:32.78	5 R	8:42.78	5 SE/F	Bye		8:43.90	2 FE	8:25.38	29

Qualification Legend: FA=Final A (medal); FB=Final B (non-medal); FC=Final C (non-medal); FD=Final D (non-medal); FE=Final E (non-medal); FF=Final F (non-medal); SA/B=Semifinals A/B; SC/D=Semifinals C/D; SE/F=Semifinals E/F; QF=Quarterfinals; R=Repechage

== Shooting ==
Moroccan shooters achieved quota places for the following events by virtue of their best finishes at the 2018 ISSF World Championships, the 2019 ISSF World Cup series, and African Championships, as long as they obtained a minimum qualifying score (MQS) by May 31, 2020.

Athlete	Event	Qualification		Final	
Athlete	Event	Points	Rank	Points	Rank
Ibtissam Marirhi	Women's skeet	117	16	Did not advance	

== Surfing ==
Morocco sent one surfer to compete in the men's shortboard at the Games. Ramzi Boukhiam secured a qualification slot for his nation, as the highest-ranked and last remaining surfer from Africa, at the 2019 ISA World Surfing Games in Miyazaki, Japan.

Athlete	Event	Round 1		Round 2		Round 3	Quarterfinal	Semifinal	Final / BM	
Athlete	Event	Points	Rank	Points	Rank	Opposition Result	Opposition Result	Opposition Result	Opposition Result	Rank
Ramzi Boukhiam	Men's shortboard	10.23	2 Q	Bye		Bourez (FRA); L 9.40–12.43	Did not advance			

== Swimming ==
Morocco received a universality invitation from FINA to send two top-ranked swimmers (one per gender) in their respective individual events to the Olympics, based on the FINA Points System of June 28, 2021.

Athlete	Event	Heat		Semifinal		Final	
Athlete	Event	Time	Rank	Time	Rank	Time	Rank
Samy Boutouil	Men's 100 m freestyle	50.37	43	Did not advance			
Lina Khiyara	Women's 200 m freestyle	2:08.80	28	Did not advance			

== Taekwondo ==
Morocco entered three athletes into the taekwondo competition at the Games. Achraf Mahboubi, Oumaima El-Bouchti, and Nada Laaraj secured the spots on the Moroccan squad with a top two finish each in the men's welterweight (80 kg), women's flyweight (49 kg), and women's lightweight category (57 kg), respectively, at the 2020 African Qualification Tournament in Rabat.

Athlete	Event	Round of 16	Quarterfinals	Semifinals	Repechage	Final / BM	
Athlete	Event	Opposition Result	Opposition Result	Opposition Result	Opposition Result	Opposition Result	Rank
Achraf Mahboubi	Men's −80 kg	Cissé (CIV); W 21–11	El-Sharabaty (JOR); L 15–17	Did not advance	Ordemann (NOR); L 10–25	Did not advance	7
Oumaima El-Bouchti	Women's −49 kg	Sim J-y (KOR); L 10–19	Did not advance				
Nada Laaraj	Women's −57 kg	Zolotic (USA); L 4–11	Did not advance		İlgün (TUR); L 0–6	Did not advance	7

== Triathlon ==
Morocco entered one triathlete to compete at the Olympics for the first time in history. Mehdi Essadiq topped the field of triathletes vying for qualification from Africa in the men's event based on the individual ITU World Rankings of 15 June 2021.

Individual

Athlete	Event	Time						Rank
Athlete	Event	Swim (1.5 km)	Trans 1	Bike (40 km)	Trans 2	Run (10 km)	Total	Rank
Mehdi Essadiq	Men's	17:58	0:48	58:13	0:40	35:46	1:53:25	45

== Volleyball ==
=== Beach ===
Morocco men's beach volleyball team qualified directly for the Olympics by winning the gold medal at the 2018–2020 CAVB Continental Cup Final in Agadir.

Athlete	Event	Preliminary round				Repechage	Round of 16	Quarterfinals	Semifinals	Final / BM	
Athlete	Event	Opposition Score	Opposition Score	Opposition Score	Rank	Opposition Score	Opposition Score	Opposition Score	Opposition Score	Opposition Score	Rank
Mohamed Abicha; Zouheir El Graoui	Men's	Bryl / Fijałek (POL); L (17–21, 11–21)	Evandro / Schmidt (BRA); L (14–21, 16–21)	E Grimalt / M Grimalt (CHI); L (14–21, 12–21)	4	Did not advance					

== Weightlifting ==
Morocco entered one male weightlifter into the Olympic competition. Abderrahim Moum topped the list of weightlifters from Africa in the men's 73 kg category based on the IWF Absolute Continental Rankings.

Athlete	Event	Snatch		Clean & Jerk		Total	Rank
Athlete	Event	Result	Rank	Result	Rank	Total	Rank
Abderrahim Moum	Men's –73 kg	127	13	151	14	278	14

== Wrestling ==
Morocco qualified one wrestler for the men's Greco-Roman 77 kg into the Olympic competition, by progressing to the top two finals at the 2021 African & Oceania Qualification Tournament in Hammamet, Tunisia.

Key:

- VT (ranking points: 5–0 or 0–5) – Victory by fall.
- VB (ranking points: 5–0 or 0–5) – Victory by injury (VF for forfeit, VA for withdrawal or disqualification)
- PP (ranking points: 3–1 or 1–3) – Decision by points – the loser with technical points.
- PO (ranking points: 3–0 or 0–3) – Decision by points – the loser without technical points.
- ST (ranking points: 4–0 or 0–4) – Great superiority – the loser without technical points and a margin of victory of at least 8 (Greco-Roman) or 10 (freestyle) points.
- SP (ranking points: 4–1 or 1–4) – Technical superiority – the loser with technical points and a margin of victory of at least 8 (Greco-Roman) or 10 (freestyle) points.

Greco-Roman

Athlete	Event	Round of 16	Quarterfinal	Semifinal	Repechage	Final / BM	
Athlete	Event	Opposition Result	Opposition Result	Opposition Result	Opposition Result	Opposition Result	Rank
Zied Ayet Ikram	Men's −77 kg	Lőrincz (HUN); L 0–5 ^{VB}	Did not advance		Yabiku (JPN); L 0–5 ^{VB}	Did not advance	16
