= Bulgaria at the 2024 Summer Olympics =

- IOC code: BUL
- NOC: Bulgarian Olympic Committee
- Website: www.bgolympic.org (in Bulgarian and English)

in Paris, France 26 July 2024 – 11 August 2024
- Competitors: 46 (21 men and 25 women) in 15 sports
- Flag bearers (opening): Stanimira Petrova; Lyubomir Epitropov
- Flag bearers (closing): Boryana Kaleyn; Semen Novikov
- Medals Ranked 26th: Gold 3 Silver 1 Bronze 3 Total 7

Summer Olympics appearances (overview)
- 1896; 1900–1920; 1924; 1928; 1932; 1936; 1948; 1952; 1956; 1960; 1964; 1968; 1972; 1976; 1980; 1984; 1988; 1992; 1996; 2000; 2004; 2008; 2012; 2016; 2020; 2024; 2028

Bulgaria competed at the 2024 Summer Olympics in Paris from 26 July to 11 August 2024. Bulgarian athletes have appeared in every edition of the Summer Olympics from 1924 onwards, except for three occasions: the 1948 Summer Olympics in London because of the nation's instigation in World War II, and the 1932 and 1984 Summer Olympics in Los Angeles because of the worldwide Great Depression and Soviet boycott, respectively.

== Medalists ==
Medal	Name	Sport	Event	Date
(gold) Gold	Semen Novikov	Wrestling	Men's Greco-Roman 87 kg	8 August
(gold) Gold	Karlos Nasar	Weightlifting	Men's 89 kg	9 August
(gold) Gold	Magomed Ramazanov	Wrestling	Men's freestyle 86 kg	9 August
(silver) Silver	Boryana Kaleyn	Gymnastics	Rhythmic individual all-around	9 August
(bronze) Bronze	Kimia Alizadeh	Taekwondo	Women's 57 kg	8 August
(bronze) Bronze	Bozhidar Andreev	Weightlifting	Men's 73 kg	8 August
(bronze) Bronze	Javier Ibáñez	Boxing	Men's featherweight	8 August

== Competitors ==
The following is the list of number of competitors in the Games.

Sport	Men	Women	Total
Athletics	2	3	5
Badminton	0	3	3
Boxing	3	2	5
Canoeing	0	1	1
Fencing	0	1	1
Gymnastics	1	8	9
Judo	2	0	2
Modern pentathlon	1	0	1
Rowing	1	1	2
Shooting	1	1	2
Swimming	3	1	4
Taekwondo	0	1	1
Tennis	0	1	1
Weightlifting	3	0	3
Wrestling	4	2	6
Total	21	25	46

== Athletics ==
Field events

Athlete	Event	Qualification		Final	
Athlete	Event	Distance	Position	Distance	Position
Tihomir Ivanov	Men's high jump	2.24	12 Q	2.27 SB	8
Bozhidar Saraboyukov	Men's long jump	7.87	14	Did not advance	
Mirela Demireva	Women's high jump	1.88	19	Did not advance	
Plamena Mitkova	Women's Long jump	6.45	19	Did not advance	
Gabriela Petrova	Women's triple jump	13.77	21	Did not advance	

== Badminton ==
Bulgaria entered three badminton players into the Olympic tournament based on the BWF Race to Paris Rankings.

Athlete	Event	Group stage				Round of 16	Quarter-final	Semi-final	Final / BM	
Athlete	Event	Opposition Score	Opposition Score	Opposition Score	Rank	Opposition Score	Opposition Score	Opposition Score	Opposition Score	Rank
Kaloyana Nalbantova	Women's singles	An S-y (KOR); L (15–21, 11–21)	Qi XF (FRA); W (21–18, 21–18)	—N/a	2	Did not advance				
Gabriela Stoeva; Stefani Stoeva	Women's doubles	Yeung NT / Yeung PL (HKG); W (21–11, 21–23, 21–15)	Liu SS / Tan N (CHN); L (21–19, 10–21, 16–21)	A. Xu / K. Xu (USA); W (21–18, 21–12)	2 Q	—N/a	Chen Qc / Jia Yf (CHN); L (15–21, 8–21)	Did not advance		

== Boxing ==
Bulgaria entered qualified five boxers (three male and two female). Cuban-born and Nanjing 2014 Youth Olympian Javier Ibáñez Díaz (men's featherweight) and Svetlana Staneva (women's featherweight), with women's bantamweight boxer Stanimira Petrova going to her third consecutive Games, secured the spots on the Bulgarian squad in their respective weight divisions by advancing to the semifinal match at the 2023 European Games in Nowy Targ, Poland. The other boxers, Rami Mofid Kiwan (men's welterweight) secured his quota, following the triumph in quota bouts round at the 2024 World Olympic Qualification Tournament 1 in Busto Arsizio, Italy and Radoslav Rosenov (men's lightweight) secured his ticket, following the triumph in quota bouts round at the 2024 World Olympic Qualification Tournament 2 in Bangkok, Thailand.

Athlete	Event	Round of 32	Round of 16	Quarterfinals	Semifinals	Final	
Athlete	Event	Opposition Result	Opposition Result	Opposition Result	Opposition Result	Opposition Result	Rank
Javier Ibáñez	Men's 57 kg	—N/a	Abduraimov (UKR); W 5–0	Harada (JPN); W 5–0	Seiitbek Uulu (KGZ); L 1–4	Did not advance	3rd place, bronze medalist(s)
Radoslav Rosenov	Men's 63.5 kg	Usmonov (TJK); W 5–0	Sanford (CAN); L 0–5	Did not advance			
Rami Mofid Kiwan	Men's 71 kg	Durkacz (POL); W 5–0	Davey (AUS); W 5–0	Jones (USA); L 0–5	Did not advance		
Stanimira Petrova	Women's 54 kg	Bye	Huang (TPE); W 4–1	Chang (CHN); L 1–4	Did not advance		
Svetlana Staneva	Women's 57 kg	Bye	Walsh (IRL); W 5–0	Lin (TPE); L 0–5	Did not advance		

== Canoeing ==
=== Sprint ===
Bulgarian canoeists qualified one boat in the following distances for the Games through the 2023 ICF Canoe Sprint World Championships in Duisburg, Germany.

Athlete	Event	Heats		Quarterfinals		Semifinals		Final	
Athlete	Event	Time	Rank	Time	Rank	Time	Rank	Time	Rank
Yoana Georgieva	Women's K-1 500 m	1:55.76	3 QF	1:51.74	3 SF	1:54.02	7	Did not advance	

Qualification Legend: FA = Qualify to final (medal); FB = Qualify to final B (non-medal)

== Fencing ==
For the first time since 2016, Bulgaria entered a fencer into the Olympic competition. Yoana Ilieva qualified for the games by winning the gold medal in the women's individual sabre event at the 2024 Europe Zonal Qualifying Tournament in Differdange, Luxembourg.

Athlete	Event	Round of 64	Round of 32	Round of 16	Quarterfinal	Semifinal	Final / BM	
Athlete	Event	Opposition Score	Opposition Score	Opposition Score	Opposition Score	Opposition Score	Opposition Score	Rank
Yoana Ilieva	Women's sabre	Bye	Takashima (JPN); W 15–10	Szűcs (HUN); L 10–15	Did not advance			10

== Gymnastics ==
=== Artistic ===
Bulgaria entered two gymnasts (one male and one female) into the games. Kevin Penev directly secured his quota to compete at the Olympics by being the highest-ranked eligible athlete in the men's vault at the 2023 World Championships in Antwerp, Belgium. Meanwhile, Valentina Georgieva secured a quota place by virtue of becoming one of the highest eligible gymnasts in women's vault, not yet qualified, through the final ranking of 2024 FIG Artistic Gymnastics World Cup series.

Men

Athlete	Event	Qualification								Final							
Athlete	Event	Apparatus						Total	Rank	Apparatus						Total	Rank
Athlete	Event	F	PH	R	V	PB	HB	Total	Rank	F	PH	R	V	PB	HB	Total	Rank
Kevin Penev	All-around	14.166	11.633	13.166	14.000	12.466	12.200	77.631	42	Did not advance							

Women

Athlete	Event	Qualification						Final					
Athlete	Event	Apparatus				Total	Rank	Apparatus				Total	Rank
Athlete	Event	V	UB	BB	F	Total	Rank	V	UB	BB	F	Total	Rank
Valentina Georgieva	Vault	13.999	—N/a			13.999	9 Q	13.983	—N/a			13.983	5
Valentina Georgieva	Uneven bars	—N/a	11.500	—N/a		11.500	75	Did not advance					
Valentina Georgieva	Balance beam	—N/a		10.633	—N/a	10.633	77	Did not advance					

=== Rhythmic ===
Bulgaria entered a squad of rhythmic gymnasts to compete each in the individual and group all-around competition, following the nation's successful top-three finish in the qualifying round at the 2022 World Championships in Sofia.

Athlete	Event	Qualification						Final					
Athlete	Event	Hoop	Ball	Clubs	Ribbon	Total	Rank	Hoop	Ball	Clubs	Ribbon	Total	Rank
Boryana Kaleyn	Individual	35.350	34.600	33.600	32.900	136.450	3 Q	35.850	36.450	34.550	33.750	140.600	2nd place, silver medalist(s)
Stiliana Nikolova	Individual	33.900	34.700	28.050	31.050	127.700	11	Did not advance					

Athletes	Event	Qualification				Final			
Athletes	Event	5 apps	3+2 apps	Total	Rank	5 apps	3+2 apps	Total	Rank
Kamelia Petrova; Sofia Ivanova; Rachel Stoyanov; Magdalina Minevska; Margarita Vasileva	Group	37.700	32.700	70.400	1 Q	34.100	33.700	67.800	4

== Judo ==
Bulgaria qualified two judoka for the following weight classes at the Games. Mark Hristov (men's lightweight, 73 kg) and Ivaylo Ivanov (men's middleweight, 90 kg) got qualified via IJF Olympics rankings and continental quota based on Olympic points rankings.

Athlete	Event	Round of 32	Round of 16	Quarterfinals	Semifinals	Repechage	Final / BM	
Athlete	Event	Opposition Result	Opposition Result	Opposition Result	Opposition Result	Opposition Result	Opposition Result	Rank
Mark Hristov	Men's –73 kg	Houssein (DJI); W 10–00	Hashimoto (JPN); L 00–01	Did not advance				
Ivaylo Ivanov	Men's –90 kg	Sagaipov (LBN); W 01–00	Bekauri (GEO); L 00–01	Did not advance				

== Modern pentathlon ==
For the first time since 2016, Bulgarian modern pentathletes confirmed a single quota place for the Olympic games. Todor Mihalev secured his spots in the men's event by virtue of top eleven eligible ranked athletes, not yet qualified, through the release of the final Olympic ranking.

Athlete	Event		Fencing (épée one touch)				Swimming (200 m freestyle)			Riding (show jumping)			Combined: shooting/running (10 m laser pistol)/(3000 m)			Total points	Final rank
Athlete	Event		RR	BR	Rank	MP points	Time	Rank	MP points	Penalties	Rank	MP points	Time	Rank	MP points	Total points	Final rank
Todor Mihalev	Men's	Semifinal	225	0	6	225	2:06.85	12	297	7	9	293	10:24.04	13	676	1491	12
Todor Mihalev	Men's	Final	Did not advance														

== Rowing ==
Bulgarian rowers qualified boats in the following classes through the 2023 World Rowing Championships in Belgrade, Serbia and 2024 European Continental Qualification Regatta in Szeged, Hungary.

Athlete	Event	Heats		Repechage		Quarterfinals		Semifinals		Final	
Athlete	Event	Time	Rank	Time	Rank	Time	Rank	Time	Rank	Time	Rank
Kristian Vasilev	Men's single sculls	6:56.63	2 QF	Bye		6:58.67	4 SC/D	6:57.75	2 FC	6:44.61	14
Desislava Angelova	Women's single sculls	7:42.73	2 QF	Bye		7:41.25	3 SA/B	7:27.16	3 FA	7:33.19	6

Qualification Legend: FA=Final A (medal); FB=Final B (non-medal); FC=Final C (non-medal); FD=Final D (non-medal); FE=Final E (non-medal); FF=Final F (non-medal); SA/B=Semifinals A/B; SC/D=Semifinals C/D; SE/F=Semifinals E/F; QF=Quarterfinals; R=Repechage

== Shooting ==
Bulgarian shooters achieved quota places for the following events, based on their results at the 2022 and 2023 ISSF World Championships, 2022-2024 European Championships, 2023 European Games and 2024 ISSF World Olympic Qualification Tournament.

Athlete	Event	Qualification		Final	
Athlete	Event	Points	Rank	Points	Rank
Kiril Kirov	Men's 10 m air pistol	575	16	Did not advance	
Antoaneta Kostadinova	Women's 10 m air pistol	573	16	Did not advance	
Antoaneta Kostadinova	Women's 25 m pistol	583	11	Did not advance	
Kiril Kirov; Antoaneta Kostadinova	10 m air pistol team	574	12	Did not advance	

== Swimming ==
Bulgarian swimmers achieved the entry standards in the following events for Paris 2024 (a maximum of two swimmers under the Olympic Qualifying Time (OST) and potentially at the Olympic Consideration Time (OCT)

Athlete	Event	Heat		Semifinal		Final	
Athlete	Event	Time	Rank	Time	Rank	Time	Rank
Petar Mitsin	Men's 400 m freestyle	3:49.30	21	—N/a		Did not advance	
Petar Mitsin	Men's 200 m butterfly	1:57.03	19	Did not advance			
Josif Miladinov	Men's 100 m butterfly	51.77	17	Did not advance			
Lyubomir Epitropov	Men's 200 m breaststroke	2:10.59	13 Q	2:09.93	9	Did not advance	
Gabriela Georgieva	Women's 100 m backstroke	1:02.16	24	Did not advance			
Gabriela Georgieva	Women's 200 m backstroke	2:12.15	21	Did not advance			

== Taekwondo ==
Bulgaria qualified one athlete to compete at Paris 2024. Kimia Alizadeh secured her spot through the 2024 European Taekwondo Olympic Qualification Tournament in Sofia, Bulgaria. Kimia Alizadeh became the first-ever taekwondo athlete to represent Bulgaria in Olympic history.

Athlete	Event	Round of 16	Quarterfinals	Semifinals	Repechage	Final / BM	
Athlete	Event	Opposition Result	Opposition Result	Opposition Result	Opposition Result	Opposition Result	Rank
Kimia Alizadeh	Women's –57 kg	Kiani (IRI); L 1–2	Did not advance		Toumi (TUN); W 2–0	Zongshi (CHN); W 2–1	3rd place, bronze medalist(s)

== Tennis ==
For the first time since 2016, Bulgaria entered tennis player into the Olympic tournament. Viktoriya Tomova had claimed one via ITF Olympic women's singles places, as Bulgaria's top-ranked tennis player in the WTA World Rankings as of 10 June 2024

Athlete	Event	Round of 64	Round of 32	Round of 16	Quarterfinals	Semifinals	Final / BM	
Athlete	Event	Opposition Score	Opposition Score	Opposition Score	Opposition Score	Opposition Score	Opposition Score	Rank
Viktoriya Tomova	Women's singles	Fręch (POL); W 6–4, 7–6^{(7–4)}	Navarro (USA); L 7–6^{(7–5)}, 4–6, 1–6	Did not advance				

== Weightlifting ==
Bulgaria entered three weightlifters into the Olympic competition. Ivan Dimov (men's 61 kg), Bozhidar Andreev (men's 73 kg) and Karlos Nasar (men's 89 kg) secured one of the top ten slots, each in their respective weight divisions based on the IWF Olympic Qualification Rankings.

Athlete	Event	Snatch		Clean & Jerk		Total	Rank
Athlete	Event	Result	Rank	Result	Rank	Total	Rank
Ivan Dimov	Men's −61 kg	~~135~~	–	–	–	–	DNF
Bozhidar Andreev	Men's −73 kg	154	4	190	4	344	3rd place, bronze medalist(s)
Karlos Nasar	Men's −89 kg	180	1	224 WR, OR	1	404 WR, OR	1st place, gold medalist(s)

== Wrestling ==
Bulgaria qualified six wrestlers for each of the following classes into the Olympic competition. Semen Novikov qualified for the games by virtue of top five results through the 2023 World Championships in Belgrade, Serbia. Bilyana Dudova qualified for the games, following the triumph of winning the semifinal match at the 2024 European Qualification Tournament in Baku, Azerbaijan. Aik Mnatsakanian, Magomed Ramazanov and Yuliana Yaneva qualified for the games through the 2024 World Qualification Tournament in Istanbul, Turkey. Later, Georgi Ivanov joined their squads due to reallocations of Individual Neutral Athletes (AIN), claimed by the IOC. His place took Kiril Milov.

Athlete	Event	Round of 16	Quarterfinal	Semifinal	Repechage	Final / BM	
Athlete	Event	Opposition Result	Opposition Result	Opposition Result	Opposition Result	Opposition Result	Rank
Magomed Ramazanov	Men's Freestyle −86 kg	Moore (CAN); W 12–2 ^{VSU1}	Shapiev (UZB); W 4–1 ^{VFA}	Brooks (USA); W 4–3 ^{VPO1}	—N/a	Yazdani (IRI); W 7–1 ^{VPO1}	1st place, gold medalist(s)
Aik Mnatsakanian	Men's Greco-Roman −77 kg	Suleymanov (AZE); L 0–2 ^{VPO}	Did not advance				12
Semen Novikov	Men's Greco-Roman −87 kg	Bisultanov (DEN); W 5–1 ^{VPO1}	Gobadze (GEO); W 8–3 ^{VPO1}	Losonczi (HUN); W 3–1 ^{VPO1}	—N/a	Mohmadi (IRI); W 7–0 ^{VPO}	1st place, gold medalist(s)
Kiril Milov	Men's Greco-Roman −130 kg	Acosta (CHI); L 1–1 ^{VPO1}	Did not advance		Mohamed (EGY); L 4–6 ^{VPO1}	Did not advance	9
Bilyana Dudova	Women's Freestyle −62 kg	Lindborg (SWE); W 8–3 ^{VPO1}	Koliadenko (UKR); L 3–7 ^{VPO1}	Did not advance	Orkhon (MGL); L 1–3 ^{VPO1}	Did not advance	8
Yuliana Yaneva	Women's Freestyle −76 kg	Marín (CUB); L 1–7 ^{VPO1}	Did not advance				15

== See also ==
- Bulgaria at the 2024 Winter Youth Olympics
- Bulgaria at the 2024 Summer Paralympics
