= 2021 Asian Taekwondo Olympic Qualification Tournament =

Taekwondo competition

The 2021 Asian Taekwondo Olympic Qualification Tournament for the Tokyo Olympic Games took place in Amman, Jordan. The tournament was held from May 21-22, 2021. Each country may enter a maximum of 2 male and 2 female divisions with only one athlete in each division. The winner and runner-up athletes per division qualify for the Olympic Games under their NOC.

== Qualification summary ==
NOC	Men				Women				Total
NOC	−58kg	−68kg	−80kg	+80kg	−49kg	−57kg	−67kg	+67kg	Total
China				X					1
Chinese Taipei		X	X		X	X			4
Iran						X			1
Jordan			X				X		2
Kazakhstan				X				X	2
Philippines	X								1
Thailand	X								1
Uzbekistan		X					X	X	3
Vietnam					X				1
Total: 9 NOCs	2	2	2	2	2	2	2	2	16

== Men ==
=== −58 kg ===
22 May

Round of 16
Yaser Sameir (UAE)
Marat Niyazov (KGZ)	RSC
Mark Khalife (LBN)	31
Tourab Nesanah (SYR)	11

Quarterfinals
Ramnarong Sawekwiharee (THA)	55
Marat Niyazov (KGZ)	4
Haroon Khan (PAK)	39
Ali Asiri (KSA)	19
Molomyn Tümenbayar (MGL)	33
Kurt Bryan Barbosa (PHI)	40
Mark Khalife (LBN)	3
Zaid Al-Halawani (JOR)	24

Semifinals
Ramnarong Sawekwiharee (THA)	32
Haroon Khan (PAK)	26
Kurt Bryan Barbosa (PHI)	50
Zaid Al-Halawani (JOR)	49

3rd place
Haroon Khan (PAK)	20
Zaid Al-Halawani (JOR)	29

=== −68 kg ===
21 May

Round of 16
Mohammad Kheirallah (SYR)	7
Hassan Al-Mesmari (UAE)	20
Ulugbek Rashitov (UZB)	28
Achitkhüügiin Natsagdorj (MGL)	11
Abdullah Al-Qarni (KSA)	13
Mahmadjon Sunatov (TJK)	21

Quarterfinals
Huang Yu-jen (TPE)	30
Hassan Al-Mesmari (UAE)	0
Lakchai Hauihongthong (THA)	37
Ahmad Bahlool (PLE)	53
Arven Alcantara (PHI)	9
Ulugbek Rashitov (UZB)	23
Mahmadjon Sunatov (TJK)	14
Kairat Sarymsakov (KAZ)	24

Semifinals
Huang Yu-jen (TPE)	20
Ahmad Bahlool (PLE)	1
Ulugbek Rashitov (UZB)	17
Kairat Sarymsakov (KAZ)	6

3rd place
Ahmad Bahlool (PLE)	9
Kairat Sarymsakov (KAZ)	12

=== −80 kg ===
21 May

Quarterfinals		Semifinals		3rd place
Saleh El-Sharabaty (JOR)	26
Wael Al-Farraj (EOR)	1	Saleh El-Sharabaty (JOR)	36
Akbar Aitakhunov (KGZ)	18	Akbar Aitakhunov (KGZ)	6
Yousef Sanasyeri (KUW)	16			Akbar Aitakhunov (KGZ)	16
Ali Al-Araimi (QAT)	12			Khurram Mehtarshoev (TJK)	14
Khurram Mehtarshoev (TJK)	14	Khurram Mehtarshoev (TJK)	1
Va Mithona (CAM)	4	Liu Wei-ting (TPE)	19
Liu Wei-ting (TPE)	38

=== +80 kg ===
22 May

Quarterfinals		Semifinals		3rd place
		Ruslan Zhaparov (KAZ)	31
Taimur Saeed (PAK)	3	Ali Akbar Amiri (EOR)	20
Ali Akbar Amiri (EOR)	10			Ali Akbar Amiri (EOR)	19
Ray Rahy (LBN)	34			Ray Rahy (LBN)	4
Nawaf Al-Hajri (KUW)	8	Ray Rahy (LBN)	9
		Sun Hongyi (CHN)	31

== Women ==
=== −49 kg ===
21 May

Round of 16
Munisa Oimatova (TJK)	7
Aneila Aysha Afsar (PAK)	10
Badreyah Bani Mualla (UAE)	4
Ghazal Kiani (PLE)	28
Mariella Bou Habib (LBN)	27
Amena Al-Jarayhe (SYR)	5

Quarterfinals
Trương Thị Kim Tuyền (VIE)	22
Aneila Aysha Afsar (PAK)	8
Lam Siu Wai (HKG)	8
Fariza Aldangorova (KAZ)	13
Mahla Momenzadeh (IRI)	24
Ghazal Kiani (PLE)	12
Mariella Bou Habib (LBN)	0
Su Po-ya (TPE)	21

Semifinals
Trương Thị Kim Tuyền (VIE)	26
Fariza Aldangorova (KAZ)	12
Mahla Momenzadeh (IRI)	4
Su Po-ya (TPE)	23

3rd place
Fariza Aldangorova (KAZ)	4
Mahla Momenzadeh (IRI)	12

=== −57 kg ===
22 May

Round of 16
Law Sin Yi (HKG)
Nahid Kiani (IRI)	RSC
Natali Hamaidi (JOR)	32
Layan Jaber (PLE)	6
Zoya Sabir (PAK)	1
Cassie Tubbs (CAM)	39
Pauline Lopez (PHI)	22
Aya Al-Jarayhe (SYR)	0
Dunya Abutaleb (KSA)	5
Laetitia Aoun (LBN)	27
Trần Thị Ánh Tuyết (VIE)	35
Jennifer Lay (TLS)	1

Quarterfinals
Phannapa Harnsujin (THA)	16
Nahid Kiani (IRI)	18
Natali Hamaidi (JOR)	5
Cassie Tubbs (CAM)	3
Pauline Lopez (PHI)	10
Laetitia Aoun (LBN)	21
Trần Thị Ánh Tuyết (VIE)	2
Lo Chia-ling (TPE)	8

Semifinals
Nahid Kiani (IRI)	4
Natali Hamaidi (JOR)	2
Laetitia Aoun (LBN)	11
Lo Chia-ling (TPE)	21

3rd place
Natali Hamaidi (JOR)	9
Laetitia Aoun (LBN)	9

=== −67 kg ===
21 May

Semifinals		3rd place
Julyana Al-Sadeq (JOR)
Bye		Bye
Maram Fatnassi (QAT)	6	Maram Fatnassi (QAT)
Nigora Tursunkulova (UZB)	26

=== +67 kg ===
22 May

Semifinals		3rd place
Cansel Deniz (KAZ)	12
Mokhru Khalimova (TJK)	2	Mokhru Khalimova (TJK)	7
Kirstie Alora (PHI)	5	Kirstie Alora (PHI)	9
Svetlana Osipova (UZB)	27
