= Taekwondo at the 2022 Asian Games – Women's 57 kg =

Taekwondo competition

Women's 57 kg at the 2022 Asian Games
- Venue: Lin'an Sports and Culture Centre
- Date: 26 September 2023
- Competitors: 15 from 15 nations

Medalists
gold medal	Luo Zongshi	China
silver medal	Lo Chia-ling	Chinese Taipei
bronze medal	Kim Yu-jin	South Korea
bronze medal	Phannapa Harnsujin	Thailand

The women's 57 kilograms event at the 2022 Asian Games took place on 26 September 2023 at Lin'an Sports and Culture Centre, Hangzhou, China.

A total of fifteen athletes participated in this weight category. The first seed Luo Zongshi from the host nation China successfully defended her title from 2018 by defeating Lo Chia-ling of Chinese Taipei in two rounds. Luo won the first round 6–2 and finished the second round 9–0 to win the gold medal. Kim Yu-jin from South Korea and Phannapa Harnsujin from Thailand finished third and won the bronze.

== Schedule ==
All times are China Standard Time (UTC+08:00)

Date	Time	Event
Tuesday, 26 September 2023	09:00	Round of 16
Tuesday, 26 September 2023	14:00	Quarterfinals
Tuesday, 26 September 2023	14:00	Semifinals
Tuesday, 26 September 2023	14:00	Gold medal contest

== Results ==
Round of 16
Aliza Chhoeung (CAM)	0	6	5
Trần Thị Ánh Tuyết (VIE)	4	5	7
Mariya Sevostyanova (KAZ)	5	14
Law Sin Yi (HKG)	0	2
Narges Mirnourollahi (IRI)	1	8
Kim Yu-jin (KOR)	13	9
Laetitia Aoun (LBN)	14	17
Sandhya Kumari Singh (NEP)	0	3
Jubilee Briones (PHI)	1	0
Phannapa Harnsujin (THA)	10	13
Madina Mirabzalova (UZB)	3	7
Munisa Oimatova (TJK)	3	0
Tshering Yangchen (BHU)	0	0
Lo Chia-ling (TPE)	13	12

Quarterfinals
Luo Zongshi (CHN)	9	12
Trần Thị Ánh Tuyết (VIE)	2	0
Mariya Sevostyanova (KAZ)	1	0
Kim Yu-jin (KOR)	7	14
Laetitia Aoun (LBN)	4	5	13
Phannapa Harnsujin (THA)	8	5	16
Madina Mirabzalova (UZB)	3	2
Lo Chia-ling (TPE)	7	11

Semifinals
Luo Zongshi (CHN)	0	6
Kim Yu-jin (KOR)	0	0
Phannapa Harnsujin (THA)	0	0
Lo Chia-ling (TPE)	1	2

Gold medal contest
Luo Zongshi (CHN)	6	9
Lo Chia-ling (TPE)	2	0
