= 2022 World Taekwondo Championships – Women's featherweight =

Taekwondo competitions

Women's featherweight at the 2022 World Championships
- Venue: Centro Acuático CODE Metropolitano
- Dates: 14 November 2022
- Competitors: 41 from 41 nations

Medalists
gold medal	Luo Zongshi	China
silver medal	Lo Chia-ling	Chinese Taipei
bronze medal	Jade Jones	Great Britain
bronze medal	Hatice Kübra İlgün	Turkey

The women's featherweight is a competition featured at the 2022 World Taekwondo Championships, and was held at the Centro Acuático CODE Metropolitano in Guadalajara, Mexico on 14 November 2022. Featherweights were limited to a maximum of 57 kilograms in body mass.

== Results ==
Legend

- DQ — Won by disqualification

=== Finals ===
Semifinals				Final
Luo Zongshi (CHN)	1	4	8
Jade Jones (GBR)	4	0	3	Luo Zongshi (CHN)	2	1
Lo Chia-ling (TPE)	1	0	5	Lo Chia-ling (TPE)	1	1
Hatice Kübra İlgün (TUR)	1	0	4

=== Top half ===
==== Section 1 ====
Round of 64
~~Mary Muriu (KEN)~~
Mayerlin Mejía (DOM)	D	Q
~~Irandani Sasikala (SRI)~~
Kristina Tomić (CRO)	D	Q
Joana Cunha (POR)	8	14
Sena Takigawa (JPN)	3	7

Round of 32
Luo Zongshi (CHN)	2	7
Mayerlin Mejía (DOM)	1	0
Melanie Kindl (AUT)	1	0
Laetitia Aoun (LBN)	7	12
~~Sandy Macedo (BRA)~~
Kristina Tomić (CRO)	D	Q
Joana Cunha (POR)	0	5
Patrycja Adamkiewicz (POL)	6	8

Round of 16
Luo Zongshi (CHN)	8	16
Laetitia Aoun (LBN)	0	3
Kristina Tomić (CRO)	1	0	6
Patrycja Adamkiewicz (POL)	0	7	2

Quarterfinals
Luo Zongshi (CHN)	3	10
Kristina Tomić (CRO)	0	2

==== Section 2 ====
Round of 64
Ingibjörg Grétarsdóttir (ISL)	1	1
Mariama Cissé (CIV)	1	6
Kamila Aimukasheva (KAZ)	3	4	1
Phạm Ngọc Châm (VIE)	3	3	1

Round of 32
Jade Jones (GBR)	14	14
Mariama Cissé (CIV)	0	0
~~Tekiath Ben Yessouf (NIG)~~
Bodine Schoenmakers (NED)	D	Q
Faidra Kalteki (GRE)	0	0
Arlet Ortiz (ESP)	0	0
Kamila Aimukasheva (KAZ)	0	3	14
Melissa Castillo (MEX)	2	3	4

Round of 16
Jade Jones (GBR)	3	6
Bodine Schoenmakers (NED)	1	1
Arlet Ortiz (ESP)	2	2
Kamila Aimukasheva (KAZ)	8	3

Quarterfinals
Jade Jones (GBR)	7	12
Kamila Aimukasheva (KAZ)	1	6

=== Bottom half ===
==== Section 3 ====
Round of 64
Madina Mirabzalova (UZB)	6	5
Tatiana Timbalari (MDA)	4	4
Daniela Muñoz (COL)	6	6
Nancy Essoughe (GAB)	4	2

Round of 32
Anastasija Zolotic (USA)	7	12
Madina Mirabzalova (UZB)	0	1
Kim Yu-jin (KOR)	1	2
Klaudija Tvaronavičiūtė (LTU)	0	0
Lo Chia-ling (TPE)	6	9	4
Nishy Lee Lindo (CRC)	2	16	1
Daniela Muñoz (COL)	4	1	5
Skylar Park (CAN)	3	5	6

Round of 16
Anastasija Zolotic (USA)	1	0
Kim Yu-jin (KOR)	0	0
Lo Chia-ling (TPE)	0	3	3
Skylar Park (CAN)	1	1	2

Quarterfinals
Anastasija Zolotic (USA)	4	8	1
Lo Chia-ling (TPE)	7	0	1

==== Section 4 ====
Round of 64
~~Mariam Barry (GUI)~~
Ruqia Rahmani (FIN)	D	Q
So Yuen Ting (HKG)	0	1
Alisson Montano (ESA)	12	5

Round of 32
Nada Laaraj (MAR)	1	2	6
Ruqia Rahmani (FIN)	2	1	3
Ashrakat Nabil (EGY)	0	0
Raheleh Asemani (BEL)	9	1
Giada Al-Halwani (ITA)	1	2
Stacey Hymer (AUS)	5	5
Alisson Montano (ESA)	3	1
Hatice Kübra İlgün (TUR)	5	7

Round of 16
Nada Laaraj (MAR)	0	1	3
Raheleh Asemani (BEL)	4	0	1
Stacey Hymer (AUS)	1	3
Hatice Kübra İlgün (TUR)	7	4

Quarterfinals
Nada Laaraj (MAR)	0	1
Hatice Kübra İlgün (TUR)	0	6
