= Taekwondo at the 2018 Summer Youth Olympics – Girls' 49 kg =

Taekwondo competition

Girls' 49 kg at the III Summer Youth Olympic Games
- Venue: Oceania Pavilion
- Date: 8 October
- Competitors: 11 from 11 nations

Medalists
1st place, gold medalist(s)		Elizaveta Ryadninskaya	Russia
2nd place, silver medalist(s)		Anastasija Zolotic	United States
3rd place, bronze medalist(s)		Lee Ye-ji	South Korea
3rd place, bronze medalist(s)		Cao Zihan	China

The girls' 49 kg competition at the 2018 Summer Youth Olympics was held on 8 October at the Oceania Pavilion.

== Schedule ==
All times are in local time (UTC-3).

Date	Time	Round
Monday, 8 October 2018	14:00; 14:45; 19:00; 20:00	Round of 16; Quarterfinals; Semifinals; Final

== Bracket ==
Round of 16
9	Tangsholpan Kaiyrzhankyzy (KAZ)	DSQ
8	Rim Bayaa (SWE)
11	Yangchen Tshering (BHU)	0
6	Hồ Thị Kim Ngân (VIE)	22
7	Kanrawee Sompan (THA)	8
10	Avishag Semberg (ISR)	17

Quarterfinals
1	Anastasija Zolotic (USA)	22
8	Rim Bayaa (SWE)	17
5	Lee Ye-ji (KOR)	21
4	Aaliyah Powell (GBR)	14
3	Elizaveta Ryadninskaya (RUS)	6
6	Hồ Thị Kim Ngân (VIE)	5
10	Avishag Semberg (ISR)	9
2	Cao Zihan (CHN)	15

Semifinals
1	Anastasija Zolotic (USA)	21
5	Lee Ye-ji (KOR)	11
3	Elizaveta Ryadninskaya (RUS)	6
2	Cao Zihan (CHN)	5

Gold medal match
1	Anastasija Zolotic (USA)	16
3	Elizaveta Ryadninskaya (RUS)	17

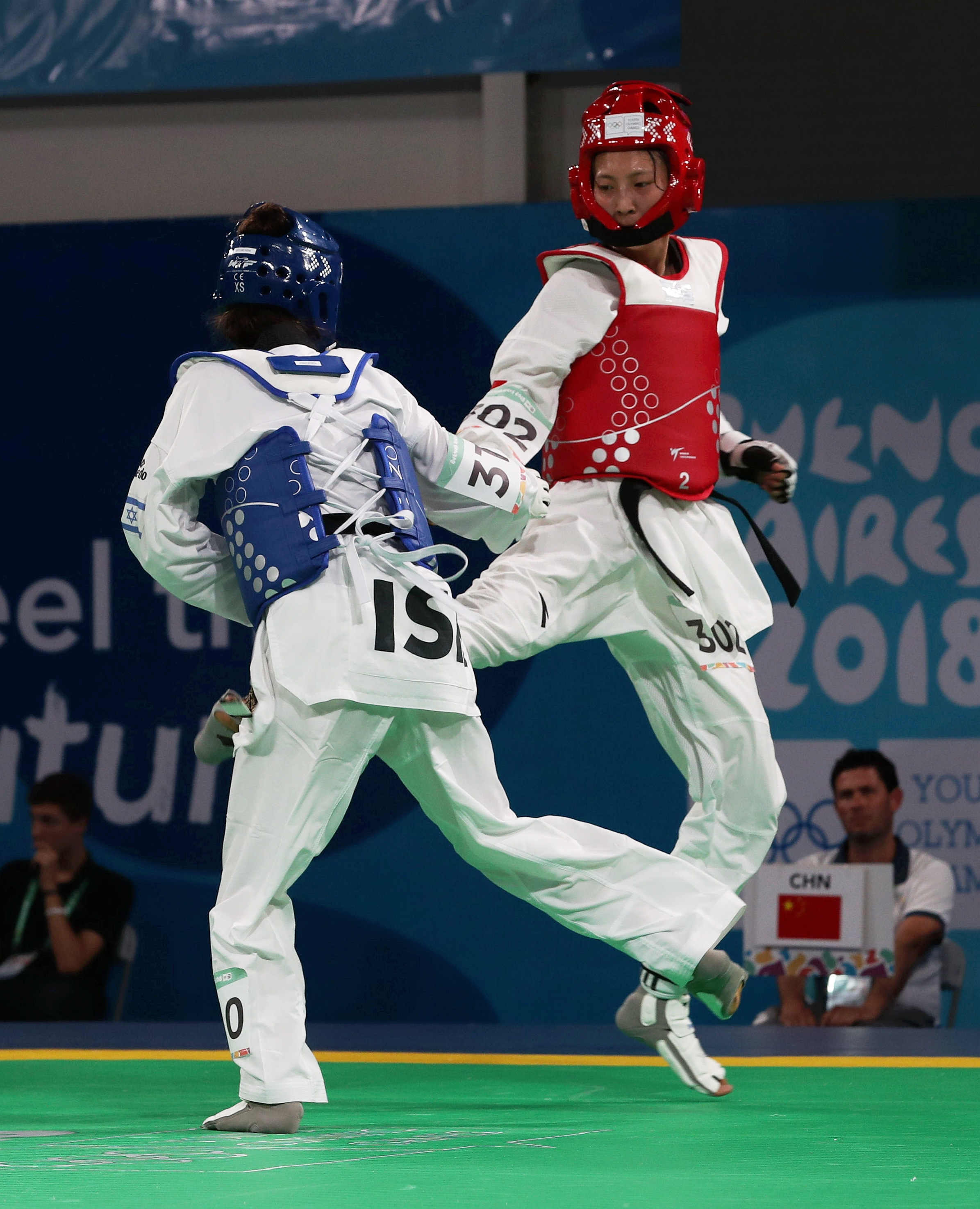
Cao Zihan (right) vs. Abishag Semberg
