= Lo Chia-ling =

Taiwanese taekwondo practitioner

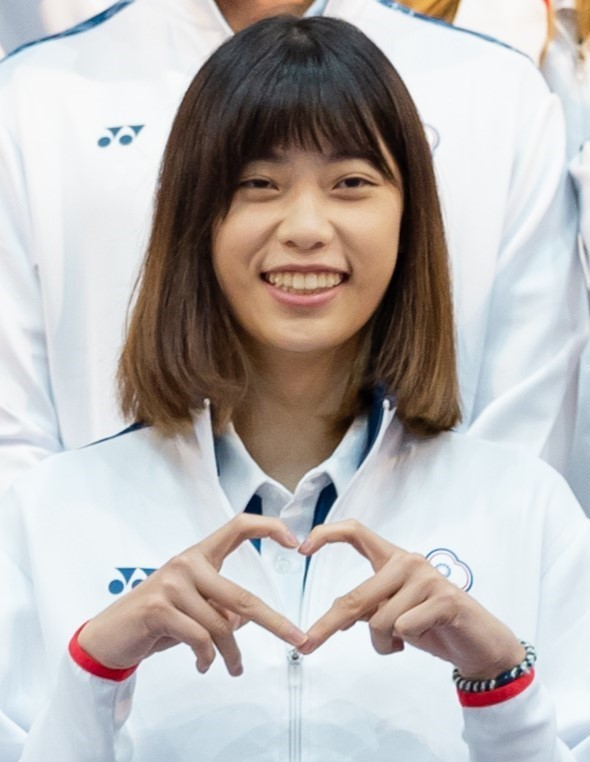
- Lo in 2024

Personal information
- Born: 8 October 2001 (age 24) New Taipei City, Taiwan
- Height: 1.85 m (6 ft 1 in)

Sport
- Country: Taiwan
- Sport: Taekwondo
- Coached by: Liu Tsung-da
Medal record
Women's taekwondo
Representing Chinese Taipei
Summer Olympics
Bronze medal – third place	2020 Tokyo	57 kg
World Championships
Silver medal – second place	2022 Guadalajara	57 kg
Silver medal – second place	2023 Baku	57 kg
Asian Games
Silver medal – second place	2022 Hangzhou	-57 kg
World University Games
Silver medal – second place	2021 Chengdu	68 kg

Lo Chia-ling (Chinese: 羅嘉翎; pinyin: Luó Jiālíng; born October 8, 2001) is a Taiwanese taekwondo athlete. After twice winning the gold medal at the World Taekwondo Junior Championships (in 2016 and 2018), she reached the Round of 16 at 2019 World Taekwondo Championships – Women's featherweight.

Having secured her berth at the 2021 Asian Taekwondo Olympic Qualification Tournament in Amman, Lo won the bronze medal in the 57 kg at the 2020 Olympics.

She won the silver medal in the women's featherweight event at the 2022 World Taekwondo Championships held in Guadalajara, Mexico. She also won the silver medal in the women's featherweight event at the 2023 World Taekwondo Championships held in Baku, Azerbaijan. At the 2024 Summer Olympics, she lost her first match to Laetitia Aoun and did not progress.
