= Taekwondo at the 2021 Islamic Solidarity Games – Women's 57 kg =

Taekwondo – Women's 57 kg at the 2021 Islamic Solidarity Games
- Venue: Selcuk University 19 Mayis Sport Hall
- Date: 9 August
- Competitors: 10 from 10 nations

Medalists
gold medal	Nada Laaraj	Morocco
silver medal	Hatice Kübra İlgün	Turkey
bronze medal	Laetitia Aoun	Lebanon
bronze medal	Nastaran Valizadeh	Iran

The women's 57 kg competition in taekwondo at the 2021 Islamic Solidarity Games was held on 9 August 2021 at the Selcuk University 19 Mayis Sport Hall in Konya.

== Results ==
Legend

- PTG — Won by Points Gap
- SUP — Won by superiority
- OT — Won on over time (Golden Point)
- DQ — Won by disqualification
- PUN — Won by punitive declaration
- WD — Won by withdrawal

=== Main Bracket ===
1/8 finals
Saida Aliyeva (AZE)
Madina Mirabzalova (UZB)
Sidibe Mariam (MLI)
Yara Yasin (JOR)

Quarterfinals
Hatice Kübra İlgün (TUR)
(25x17px)
Kamila Aimukasheva (KAZ)	0
Nastaran Valizadeh (IRI)	2
Laetitia Aoun (LBN)
Noor Rehman (PAK)
(25x17px)
Nada Laaraj (MAR)

Semifinals
Hatice Kübra İlgün (TUR)	2
Nastaran Valizadeh (IRI)	1
Laetitia Aoun (LBN)
Nada Laaraj (MAR)

Final
Hatice Kübra İlgün (TUR)	0
Nada Laaraj (MAR)	2
