= 2022 World Taekwondo Grand Prix =

Taekwondo competition

The 2022 World Taekwondo Grand Prix is the 8th edition of the World Taekwondo Grand Prix series.

== Schedule ==
Event	Date	Venue	Ref.
Series 1	June 3–5	Rome, Italy	
Series 2	September 2–4	Paris, France	
Series 3	October 21–23	Manchester, United Kingdom	
Final	December 8–10	Riyadh, Saudi Arabia	

== Men ==
=== 58 kg ===
Event	Gold	Silver	Bronze
Rome	Jang Jun (KOR)	Mohamed Khalil Jendoubi (TUN)	Adrián Vicente (ESP)
Rome	Jang Jun (KOR)	Mohamed Khalil Jendoubi (TUN)	Görkem Polat (TUR)
Paris	Cyrian Ravet (FRA)	Mohamed Khalil Jendoubi (TUN)	Bailey Lewis (AUS)
Paris	Cyrian Ravet (FRA)	Mohamed Khalil Jendoubi (TUN)	Adrián Vicente (ESP)
Manchester	Park Tae-joon (KOR)	Mohamed Khalil Jendoubi (TUN)	Vito Dell'Aquila (ITA)
Manchester	Park Tae-joon (KOR)	Mohamed Khalil Jendoubi (TUN)	Jack Woolley (IRL)
Riyadh	Jang Jun (KOR)	Mohamed Khalil Jendoubi (TUN)	Cyrian Ravet (FRA)

=== 68 kg ===
Event	Gold	Silver	Bronze
Rome	Hakan Reçber (TUR)	Ali Alian (SWE)	Bradly Sinden (GBR)
Rome	Hakan Reçber (TUR)	Ali Alian (SWE)	Jin Ho-jun (KOR)
Paris	Javier Pérez (ESP)	Zaid Kareem (JOR)	Bradly Sinden (GBR)
Paris	Javier Pérez (ESP)	Zaid Kareem (JOR)	Théo Lucien (FRA)
Manchester	Jin Ho-jun (KOR)	Zaid Kareem (JOR)	Khalfani Harris (USA)
Manchester	Jin Ho-jun (KOR)	Zaid Kareem (JOR)	Bradly Sinden (GBR)
Riyadh	Zaid Kareem (JOR)	Ulugbek Rashitov (UZB)	Hakan Reçber (TUR)

=== 80 kg ===
Event	Gold	Silver	Bronze
Rome	Simone Alessio (ITA)	Seif Eissa (EGY)	Park Woo-hyeok (KOR)
Rome	Simone Alessio (ITA)	Seif Eissa (EGY)	Shukhrat Salaev (UZB)
Paris	Simone Alessio (ITA)	Richard Ordemann (NOR)	Firas Katoussi (TUN)
Paris	Simone Alessio (ITA)	Richard Ordemann (NOR)	Carl Nickolas (USA)
Manchester	Seo Geon-woo (KOR)	Simone Alessio (ITA)	Hwan Nam-goong (KOR)
Manchester	Seo Geon-woo (KOR)	Simone Alessio (ITA)	Firas Katoussi (TUN)
Riyadh	Simone Alessio (ITA)	Seo Geon-woo (KOR)	Seif Eissa (EGY)

=== +80 kg ===
Event	Gold	Silver	Bronze
Rome	Emre Kutalmış Ateşli (TUR)	Cheick Sallah Cissé (CIV)	Caden Cunningham (GBR)
Rome	Emre Kutalmış Ateşli (TUR)	Cheick Sallah Cissé (CIV)	Dejan Georgievski (MKD)
Paris	Rafael Alba (CUB)	Ivan Šapina (CRO)	Cheick Sallah Cissé (CIV)
Paris	Rafael Alba (CUB)	Ivan Šapina (CRO)	Iván García (ESP)
Manchester	Maicon Andrade (BRA)	Caden Cunningham (GBR)	Emre Kutalmış Ateşli (TUR)
Manchester	Maicon Andrade (BRA)	Caden Cunningham (GBR)	Cheick Sallah Cissé (CIV)
Riyadh	Cheick Sallah Cissé (CIV)	Carlos Sansores (MEX)	Dejan Georgievski (MKD)

== Women ==
=== 49 kg ===
Event	Gold	Silver	Bronze
Rome	Adriana Cerezo (ESP)	Bruna Duvančić (CRO)	Sim Jae-young (KOR)
Rome	Adriana Cerezo (ESP)	Bruna Duvančić (CRO)	Daniela Souza (MEX)
Paris	Panipak Wongpattanakit (THA)	Merve Dinçel (TUR)	Kang Bo-ra (KOR)
Paris	Panipak Wongpattanakit (THA)	Merve Dinçel (TUR)	Ela Aydin (GER)
Manchester	Panipak Wongpattanakit (THA)	Merve Dinçel (TUR)	Qing Guo (CHN)
Manchester	Panipak Wongpattanakit (THA)	Merve Dinçel (TUR)	Adriana Cerezo (ESP)
Riyadh	Panipak Wongpattanakit (THA)	Merve Dinçel (TUR)	Adriana Cerezo (ESP)

=== 57 kg ===
Event	Gold	Silver	Bronze
Rome	Luo Zongshi (CHN)	Jade Jones (GBR)	Anastasija Zolotic (USA)
Rome	Luo Zongshi (CHN)	Jade Jones (GBR)	Skylar Park (CAN)
Paris	Luo Zongshi (CHN)	Skylar Park (CAN)	Nada Laaraj (MAR)
Paris	Luo Zongshi (CHN)	Skylar Park (CAN)	Zhou Lijun (CHN)
Manchester	Luo Zongshi (CHN)	Jade Jones (GBR)	Anastasija Zolotic (USA)
Manchester	Luo Zongshi (CHN)	Jade Jones (GBR)	Hatice Kübra İlgün (TUR)
Riyadh	Luo Zongshi (CHN)	Hatice Kübra İlgün (TUR)	Skylar Park (CAN)

=== 67 kg ===
Event	Gold	Silver	Bronze
Rome	Magda Wiet-Hénin (FRA)	Julyana Al-Sadeq (JOR)	Kim Jan-di (KOR)
Rome	Magda Wiet-Hénin (FRA)	Julyana Al-Sadeq (JOR)	Ruth Gbagbi (CIV)
Paris	Ruth Gbagbi (CIV)	Nam Min-seo (KOR)	Leslie Soltero (MEX)
Paris	Ruth Gbagbi (CIV)	Nam Min-seo (KOR)	Sarah Chaâri (BEL)
Manchester	Magda Wiet-Hénin (FRA)	Aleksandra Perišić (SRB)	Lauren Williams (GBR)
Manchester	Magda Wiet-Hénin (FRA)	Aleksandra Perišić (SRB)	Petra Štolbová (CZE)
Riyadh	Julyana Al-Sadeq (JOR)	Zhang Mengyu (CHN)	Magda Wiet-Hénin (FRA)

=== +67 kg ===
Event	Gold	Silver	Bronze
Rome	Lee Da-bin (KOR)	Crystal Weekes (PUR)	Rebecca McGowan (GBR)
Rome	Lee Da-bin (KOR)	Crystal Weekes (PUR)	Maristella Smiraglia (ITA)
Paris	Lee Da-bin (KOR)	Althéa Laurin (FRA)	Nafia Kuş (TUR)
Paris	Lee Da-bin (KOR)	Althéa Laurin (FRA)	Gabriele Siqueira (BRA)
Manchester	Lorena Brandl (GER)	Althéa Laurin (FRA)	Aleksandra Kowalczuk (POL)
Manchester	Lorena Brandl (GER)	Althéa Laurin (FRA)	Lei Xu (CHN)
Riyadh	Sude Yaren Uzunçavdar (TUR)	Bianca Walkden (GBR)	Nafia Kuş (TUR)

== Medal table ==
Rank	Nation	Gold	Silver	Bronze	Total
1	South Korea	7	2	6	15
2	China	4	1	3	8
3	Turkey	3	4	6	13
4	France	3	2	3	8
5	Italy	3	1	2	6
6	Thailand	3	0	0	3
7	Jordan	2	3	0	5
8	Ivory Coast	2	1	3	6
9	Spain	2	0	5	7
10	Brazil	1	0	1	2
10	Germany	1	0	1	2
12	Cuba	1	0	0	1
13	Great Britain	0	4	6	10
14	Tunisia	0	4	2	6
15	Croatia	0	2	0	2
16	Canada	0	1	2	3
16	Mexico	0	1	2	3
18	Egypt	0	1	1	2
18	Uzbekistan	0	1	1	2
20	Norway	0	1	0	1
20	Puerto Rico	0	1	0	1
20	Serbia	0	1	0	1
20	Sweden	0	1	0	1
24	United States	0	0	4	4
25	North Macedonia	0	0	2	2
26	Australia	0	0	1	1
26	Belgium	0	0	1	1
26	Czech Republic	0	0	1	1
26	Ireland	0	0	1	1
26	Morocco	0	0	1	1
26	Poland	0	0	1	1
Totals (31 entries)		32	32	56	120
