= Taekwondo at the 2019 Pan American Games – Women's 57 kg =

Taekwondo – Women's 57 kg at the 2019 Pan American Games
- Venue: Polideportivo Callao
- Dates: July 28
- Competitors: 14 from 14 nations

Medalists
Gold medal	Anastasija Zolotic	United States
Silver medal	Skylar Park	Canada
Bronze medal	Nishy Lee Lindo	Costa Rica
Bronze medal	Fernanda Aguirre	Chile

The women's 57 kg competition of the taekwondo events at the 2019 Pan American Games took place on July 28 at the Polideportivo Callao.

== Results ==
=== Main bracket ===
The final results were:

Preliminary round
Génesis Andújar (DOM)	7
Fernanda Aguirre (CHI)	27
Rafaela Vieira (BRA)	5
Mell Mina (ECU)	10
Gianella Évolo (ARG)	7
Aittana Moya (PER)	3
Carolena Carstens (PAN)	20
Yamicel Núñez (CUB)	0
Adriana Martínez (VEN)	4
Fabiola Villegas (MEX)	15
María Álvarez (COL)	14
Nishy Lee Lindo (CRC)	18

Quarterfinals
Skylar Park (CAN)	17
Fernanda Aguirre (CHI)	11
Mell Mina (ECU)	7
Gianella Évolo (ARG)	8
Carolena Carstens (PAN)	35
Fabiola Villegas (MEX)	15
Nishy Lee Lindo (CRC)	8
Anastasija Zolotic (USA)	23

Semifinals
Skylar Park (CAN)	14
Gianella Évolo (ARG)	1
Carolena Carstens (PAN)	10
Anastasija Zolotic (USA)	24

Gold medal match
Skylar Park (CAN)	22
Anastasija Zolotic (USA)	32

=== Repechage ===
Bronze medal match
Gianella Évolo (ARG)	3
Nishy Lee Lindo (CRC)	10

Bronze medal match
Fernanda Aguirre (CHI)	12
Carolena Carstens (PAN)	7
