= Mell Mina =

Ecuadorian taekwondo practitioner

Personal information
- Full name: Mell Karen Mina Ayoví
- Born: 23 October 2002 (age 23)

Sport
- Country: Ecuador
- Sport: Taekwondo
- Weight class: 67 kg
Medal record
Women's taekwondo
Representing Ecuador
South American Games
Silver medal – second place	2022 Asunción	67 kg
Pan American Championships
Bronze medal – third place	2022 Punta Cana	62 kg
Bolivarian Games
Bronze medal – third place	2022 Valledupar	67 kg
Junior Pan American Games
Bronze medal – third place	2021 Cali-Valle	67 kg

Mell Karen Mina Ayoví (born 23 October 2002) is an Ecuadorian taekwondo practitioner. She won the silver medal in the women's 67 kg event at the 2022 South American Games in Asunción, Paraguay. She also won one of the bronze medals in her event at the 2022 Bolivarian Games in Valledupar, Colombia.

In 2019, Mina competed in the women's featherweight event at the World Taekwondo Championships held in Manchester, United Kingdom. She also competed in the women's 57 kg event at the 2019 Pan American Games held in Lima, Peru. In 2020, she competed at the Pan American Olympic Qualification Tournament in Heredia, Costa Rica hoping to qualify for the 2020 Summer Olympics in Tokyo, Japan.

Mina won one of the bronze medals in the women's 62 kg event at the 2022 Pan American Taekwondo Championships held in Punta Cana, Dominican Republic. A few months later, she was eliminated in her first match in the women's lightweight event at the 2022 World Taekwondo Championships held in Guadalajara, Mexico.

In 2023, she competed in the women's lightweight event at the World Taekwondo Championships held in Baku, Azerbaijan. She was eliminated in her first match.
