= Taekwondo at the 2022 Mediterranean Games – Women's 57 kg =

Taekwondo competition

Taekwondo – Women's 57 kg at the 2022 Mediterranean Games
- Venue: Mohammed Ben Ahmed Convention Centre
- Date: 3 July
- Competitors: 10 from 10 nations

Medalists
gold medal	Hatice Kübra İlgün	Turkey
silver medal	Ashrakat Darwish	Egypt
bronze medal	Giada Al Halwani	Italy
bronze medal	Kanélya Carabin	France

The women's 57 kg competition in taekwondo at the 2022 Mediterranean Games was held on 3 July at the Mohammed ben Ahmed CCO in Oran.

== Results ==
Legend

- PTG — Won by Points Gap
- SUP — Won by superiority
- OT — Won on over time (Golden Point)
- DQ — Won by disqualification
- PUN — Won by punitive declaration
- WD — Won by withdrawal

Round of 16
Samia Zeggane (ALG)	6
Markella Teggeri (CYP)	26^{PTG}
Ashrakat Darwish (EGY)	7
Sanja Popovska (MKD)	5

Quarterfinals
Hatice Kübra İlgün (TUR)	22^{PTG}
Markella Teggeri (CYP)	2
Giada Al Halwani (ITA)	28^{PTG}
Aleksandra Radmilović (SRB)	8
Faidra Kalteki (GRE)	12
Kanélya Carabin (FRA)	14
Ashrakat Darwish (EGY)	13^{RSC}
Nada Laaraj (MAR)	13

Semifinals
Hatice Kübra İlgün (TUR)	12
Giada Al Halwani (ITA)	3
Kanélya Carabin (FRA)	13
Ashrakat Darwish (EGY)	21

Final
Hatice Kübra İlgün (TUR)	28
Ashrakat Darwish (EGY)	7
