= Elizaveta Ryadninskaya =

Russian taekwondo practitioner

Personal information
- Nationality: Russian
- Born: 31 October 2001 (age 24) Moscow, Russia
- Weight: 49 kg (108 lb)

Sport
- Sport: Taekwondo
- Event: –49 kg
- Team: RUS
Medal record
Women's taekwondo
Representing Russia
European Championships
Bronze medal – third place	2021 Sofia	49 kg
Grand Prix
Gold medal – first place	2019 Rome	49 kg
Youth Olympic Games
Gold medal – first place	2018 Buenos Aires	49 kg
European Junior Championships
Gold medal – first place	2017 Larnaca	49 kg
- Updated on April 10, 2021

Elizaveta Ilyinichna Ryadninskaya (Russian: Елизавета Ильинична Ряднинская; born October 31, 2001) is a Russian taekwondo athlete. She won the gold medal at the 2018 Summer Youth Olympics on the Girls 49 kg.
