= Kimia Alizadeh =

Iranian-Bulgarian taekwondo athlete

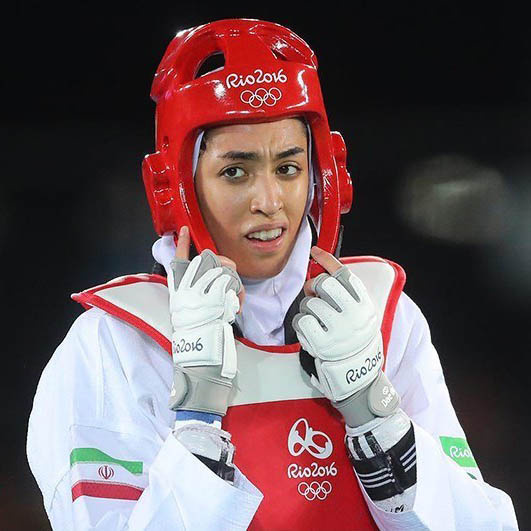
- Alizadeh at the 2016 Summer Olympics

Personal information
- Native name: کیمیا علیزاده زنوزی
- Nationality: Bulgarian
- Born: 10 July 1998 (age 28) Karaj, Iran
- Height: 185 cm (6 ft 1 in)
- Weight: 57 kg (126 lb)

Sport
- Country: Iran (until 2020); Refugee Team (2021–2024); Bulgaria (2024-)
- Sport: Taekwondo
- Event: Featherweight
Medal record
Event	1st	2nd	3rd
Summer Olympics	0	0	2
World Championships	0	1	1
Grand Prix	1	0	0
Asian Championships	0	0	1
European Championships	1	0	1
Team World Cup	0	1	0
Youth Olympics	1	0	0
World Junior Championships	1	0	0
Representing Bulgaria
Olympic Games
Bronze medal – third place	2024 Paris	57 kg
European Championships
Gold medal – first place	2024 Belgrade	62 kg
Representing (International Olympic Committee) Refugee Team
European Championships
Bronze medal – third place	2022 Manchester	62 kg
Representing Iran
Olympic Games
Bronze medal – third place	2016 Rio de Janeiro	57 kg
World Championships
Silver medal – second place	2017 Muju	63 kg
Bronze medal – third place	2015 Chelyabinsk	57 kg
Grand Prix
Gold medal – first place	2015 Moscow	57 kg
Asian Championships
Bronze medal – third place	2018 Ho Chi Minh City	62 kg
Youth Olympic Games
Gold medal – first place	2014 Nanjing	63 kg
World Junior Championships
Gold medal – first place	2014 Taipei	52 kg

Kimia Alizadeh Zonouzi (Persian: کیمیا علیزاده زنوزی, romanized: Kīmiyā Alīzādeh Zonūzī, Bulgarian: Кимия Ализаде, romanized: Kimiya Alizade; born 10 July 1998) is an Iranian-born Bulgarian taekwondo athlete, representing Bulgaria. Alizadeh won a bronze medal in the taekwondo 57 kg weight class at the 2016 Summer Olympics in Rio de Janeiro by defeating Swedish athlete Nikita Glasnović. This made her the first Iranian woman to win a medal at a Summer Olympics. She also won a gold medal in the women's 62-kg class at the Nanjing 2014 Youth Olympic Games. She beat London 2012 and Rio de Janeiro 2016 gold medallist Jade Jones at the 2015 World Championship to win a bronze medal. She also won a silver medal two years later at the 2017 World Taekwondo Championships.

In January 2020, Alizadeh announced that she was leaving Iran permanently for Europe. Explaining her defection, she stated, "I am one of the millions of oppressed women in Iran who they have been playing with for years." She stated she did not intend to compete for Iran in the 2020 Summer Olympics, and expressed the desire to compete for her place of residence, Germany. Having been licensed to compete in the Tokyo Olympics, she competed as part of the Refugee Olympic Team. Alizadeh won bronze at the 2022 European Taekwondo Championships while representing the Refugee Team.

In 2024, she received her Bulgarian citizenship before winning gold at the 2024 European Taekwondo Championships and representing Bulgaria at the 2024 Summer Olympics, where she won bronze.

== Early life ==
Kimia was born in Karaj. Her family are Azerbaijani. Her father is from Zonuz near Tabriz and her mother is from Ardabil. Until after the 2016 Olympics her last name was incorrectly recorded as Zenoorin.

== Taekwondo career ==
Alizadeh at 18 years of age won a bronze medal in the taekwondo 57 kg weight class at the 2016 Summer Olympics in Rio de Janeiro by defeating Swedish athlete Nikita Glasnović. Her victory made her the first Iranian woman to win a medal at a Summer Olympics.

She also won a gold medal in the women's 63-kg class at the Nanjing 2014 Youth Olympics. She beat London 2012 and Rio de Janeiro 2016 gold medallist Jade Jones at the 2015 World Taekwondo Championships to win a bronze medal. She also won a silver medal two years later at the 2017 World Taekwondo Championships.

She was listed in 100 inspiring and influential women from around the world for 2019 by BBC.

During the 2020 Summer Olympics, Alizadeh represented the Refugee Olympic Team, defeating Iranian athlete Nahid Kiani and pulling an upset against number one ranked Jade Jones before losing out on a bronze medal.

In 2022, Alizadeh won bronze at the 2022 European Taekwondo Championships while representing the Refugee Team. In March 2024, the Bulgaria Taekwondo Federation announced that Alizadeh would represent Bulgaria at the 2024 Summer Olympics. Before the Olympics in May 2024, she represented Bulgaria at the 2024 European Championships, where she won the gold medal in women's 62 kg. At the Paris Olympics, Alizadeh became Bulgaria's first-ever taekwondo athlete at the Olympics and won bronze.

== Defection ==
On 10 January 2020, Alizadeh announced she was defecting and leaving her birth country, with searing criticism of the regime of Iran. She did not compete for Iran in the 2020 Summer Olympics, and considered competing for Germany, but ultimately competed on the refugee team.

She wrote an Instagram post explaining she was defecting because of constraint of women in Iran, calling herself "one of the millions of oppressed women in Iran who [Iran's rulers] have been playing with for years." "They took me wherever they wanted. I wore whatever they said. Every sentence they ordered me to say, I repeated. Whenever they saw fit, they exploited me," she wrote, adding that credit always went to those in charge. She wrote further that she "didn't want to sit at the table of hypocrisy, lies, injustice and flattery" any longer, nor remain complicit with the regime's "corruption and lies."

She has expressed her love for her country and country women many times; however, her issue is with the rulers.

Abdolkarim Hosseinzadeh, a member of Iran's parliament, accused “incompetent officials” of allowing Iran's “human capital to flee”.

In the months prior to her defection, a number of top Iranian sports figures had decided to stop representing — or to physically leave — Iran. In September 2019, Saeid Mollaei, who practices judo and was world champion, left Iran for Germany after Iranian officials allegedly pressured him to throw a match to avoid competing against Israelis. Alireza Firouzja, who was Iran's top-rated chess champion, decided to stop playing for Iran in December 2019 because of Iran's informal ban on competing against Israeli players.

On 9 January 2026, during the 2025–2026 Iranian protests, following Reza Pahlavi, Crown Prince of Iran's call for protests, Alizadeh stated: "You saw everyone came. Iran came. The breath of Iran and warm Iranians." Alizadeh attended the 2026 Iranian diaspora protests and stated detained protesters in Iran were being executed.

She moved to Eindhoven, the Netherlands where she started training under taekwondo coach Mimoun El Boujjoufi.

== See also ==
- List of Iranian defectors
- List of Iranian women athletes

== Additional sources ==
- Kimia Alizadeh Zenoorin and Hedaya Wahba lead charge of Muslim women in taekwondo Official website of 2016 Summer Olympics
