= 2019 World Taekwondo Grand Prix =

Taekwondo competition

The 2019 World Taekwondo Grand Prix was the 7th edition of the World Taekwondo Grand Prix series.

The Grand Prix Final in Moscow served as qualification for the 2020 Summer Olympics, the winners from each category earned their NOCs a qualification.

== Schedule ==
Event	Date	Venue	Ref.
Series 1	June 7–9	Rome, Italy	
Series 2	September 13–15	Chiba, Japan	
Series 3	October 18–20	Sofia, Bulgaria	
Final	December 6–7	Moscow, Russia	

== Men ==
=== 58 kg ===
Event	Gold	Silver	Bronze
Rome	Jang Jun (KOR)	Jesús Tortosa (ESP)	Kim Tae-hun (KOR)
Rome	Jang Jun (KOR)	Jesús Tortosa (ESP)	Mikhail Artamonov (RUS)
Chiba	Jang Jun (KOR)	Armin Hadipour (IRI)	Vito Dell'Aquila (ITA)
Chiba	Jang Jun (KOR)	Armin Hadipour (IRI)	Adrián Vicente (ESP)
Sofia	Jang Jun (KOR)	Kim Tae-hun (KOR)	Armin Hadipour (IRI)
Sofia	Jang Jun (KOR)	Kim Tae-hun (KOR)	Vito Dell'Aquila (ITA)
Moscow	Vito Dell'Aquila (ITA)	Jang Jun (KOR)	Georgy Popov (RUS)

=== 68 kg ===
Event	Gold	Silver	Bronze
Rome	Mirhashem Hosseini (IRI)	Lee Dae-hoon (KOR)	Bradly Sinden (GBR)
Rome	Mirhashem Hosseini (IRI)	Lee Dae-hoon (KOR)	Zhao Shuai (CHN)
Chiba	Mirhashem Hosseini (IRI)	Christian McNeish (GBR)	Lee Dae-hoon (KOR)
Chiba	Mirhashem Hosseini (IRI)	Christian McNeish (GBR)	Edival Pontes (BRA)
Sofia	Zhao Shuai (CHN)	Lee Dae-hoon (KOR)	Soroush Ahmadi (IRI)
Sofia	Zhao Shuai (CHN)	Lee Dae-hoon (KOR)	Huang Yu-jen (TPE)
Moscow	Lee Dae-hoon (KOR)	Bradly Sinden (GBR)	Zhao Shuai (CHN)

=== 80 kg ===
Event	Gold	Silver	Bronze
Rome	Maksim Khramtsov (RUS)	Raúl Martínez (ESP)	Achraf Mahboubi (MAR)
Rome	Maksim Khramtsov (RUS)	Raúl Martínez (ESP)	Cheick Sallah Cissé (CIV)
Chiba	Milad Beigi (AZE)	Maksim Khramtsov (RUS)	Toni Kanaet (CRO)
Chiba	Milad Beigi (AZE)	Maksim Khramtsov (RUS)	Anton Kotkov (RUS)
Sofia	Saleh El-Sharabaty (JOR)	Seif Eissa (EGY)	Ícaro Miguel Soares (BRA)
Sofia	Saleh El-Sharabaty (JOR)	Seif Eissa (EGY)	Moisés Hernández (DOM)
Moscow	Maksim Khramtsov (RUS)	Milad Beigi (AZE)	Nikita Rafalovich (UZB)

=== +80 kg ===
Event	Gold	Silver	Bronze
Rome	Vladislav Larin (RUS)	Ruslan Zhaparov (KAZ)	Sajjad Mardani (IRI)
Rome	Vladislav Larin (RUS)	Ruslan Zhaparov (KAZ)	Mahama Cho (GBR)
Chiba	In Kyo-don (KOR)	Vladislav Larin (RUS)	Radik Isayev (AZE)
Chiba	In Kyo-don (KOR)	Vladislav Larin (RUS)	Sajjad Mardani (IRI)
Sofia	Maicon Andrade (BRA)	In Kyo-don (KOR)	Ivan Šapina (CRO)
Sofia	Maicon Andrade (BRA)	In Kyo-don (KOR)	Sun Hongyi (CHN)
Moscow	In Kyo-don (KOR)	Sajjad Mardani (IRI)	Radik Isayev (AZE)

== Women ==
=== 49 kg ===
Event	Gold	Silver	Bronze
Rome	Elizaveta Ryadninskaya (RUS)	Sim Jae-young (KOR)	Miyu Yamada (JPN)
Rome	Elizaveta Ryadninskaya (RUS)	Sim Jae-young (KOR)	Trương Thị Kim Tuyến (VIE)
Chiba	Panipak Wongpattanakit (THA)	Wu Jingyu (CHN)	Tijana Bogdanović (SRB)
Chiba	Panipak Wongpattanakit (THA)	Wu Jingyu (CHN)	Sim Jae-young (KOR)
Sofia	Wu Jingyu (CHN)	Kim So-hui (KOR)	Tijana Bogdanović (SRB)
Sofia	Wu Jingyu (CHN)	Kim So-hui (KOR)	Wenren Yuntao (CHN)
Moscow	Tijana Bogdanović (SRB)	Wu Jingyu (CHN)	Rukiye Yıldırım (TUR)

=== 57 kg ===
Event	Gold	Silver	Bronze
Rome	Lee Ah-reum (KOR)	Hatice Kübra İlgün (TUR)	Skylar Park (CAN)
Rome	Lee Ah-reum (KOR)	Hatice Kübra İlgün (TUR)	Anastasija Zolotic (USA)
Chiba	Hatice Kübra İlgün (TUR)	Nada Laraaj (MAR)	Phannapa Harnsujin (THA)
Chiba	Hatice Kübra İlgün (TUR)	Nada Laraaj (MAR)	Tatiana Kudashova (RUS)
Sofia	Zhou Lijun (CHN)	Lee Ah-reum (KOR)	Hatice Kübra İlgün (TUR)
Sofia	Zhou Lijun (CHN)	Lee Ah-reum (KOR)	Tatiana Kudashova (RUS)
Moscow	Luo Zongshi (CHN)	Hatice Kübra İlgün (TUR)	Anastasija Zolotic (USA)

=== 67 kg ===
Event	Gold	Silver	Bronze
Rome	Matea Jelić (CRO)	Kim Jan-di (KOR)	Magda Wiet-Hénin (FRA)
Rome	Matea Jelić (CRO)	Kim Jan-di (KOR)	Hedaya Malak (EGY)
Chiba	Magda Wiet-Hénin (FRA)	Matea Jelić (CRO)	Guo Yunfei (CHN)
Chiba	Magda Wiet-Hénin (FRA)	Matea Jelić (CRO)	Nigora Tursunkulova (UZB)
Sofia	Ruth Gbagbi (CIV)	Lauren Williams (GBR)	Julyana Al-Sadeq (JOR)
Sofia	Ruth Gbagbi (CIV)	Lauren Williams (GBR)	Nur Tatar (TUR)
Moscow	Ruth Gbagbi (CIV)	Matea Jelić (CRO)	Paige McPherson (USA)

=== +67 kg ===
Event	Gold	Silver	Bronze
Rome	Lee Da-bin (KOR)	Briseida Acosta (MEX)	Gabriele Siqueira (BRA)
Rome	Lee Da-bin (KOR)	Briseida Acosta (MEX)	Aleksandra Kowalczuk (POL)
Chiba	Zheng Shuyin (CHN)	Bianca Walkden (GBR)	Svetlana Osipova (UZB)
Chiba	Zheng Shuyin (CHN)	Bianca Walkden (GBR)	María Espinoza (MEX)
Sofia	Zheng Shuyin (CHN)	Bianca Walkden (GBR)	Milica Mandić (SRB)
Sofia	Zheng Shuyin (CHN)	Bianca Walkden (GBR)	Myeong Mi-na (KOR)
Moscow	Zheng Shuyin (CHN)	Milica Mandić (SRB)	Gao Pan (CHN)

== Medal table ==
Rank	Nation	Gold	Silver	Bronze	Total
1	South Korea (KOR)	8	9	4	21
2	China (CHN)	7	2	6	15
3	Russia (RUS)	4	2	5	11
4	Iran (IRI)	2	2	4	8
5	Ivory Coast (CIV)	2	0	1	3
6	Turkey (TUR)	1	2	3	6
7	Croatia (CRO)	1	2	2	5
8	Serbia (SRB)	1	1	3	5
9	Azerbaijan (AZE)	1	1	2	4
10	Brazil (BRA)	1	0	3	4
11	Italy (ITA)	1	0	2	3
12	France (FRA)	1	0	1	2
12	Jordan (JOR)	1	0	1	2
12	Thailand (THA)	1	0	1	2
15	Great Britain (GBR)	0	5	2	7
16	Spain (ESP)	0	2	1	3
17	Egypt (EGY)	0	1	1	2
17	Mexico (MEX)	0	1	1	2
17	Morocco (MAR)	0	1	1	2
20	Kazakhstan (KAZ)	0	1	0	1
21	United States (USA)	0	0	3	3
21	Uzbekistan (UZB)	0	0	3	3
23	Canada (CAN)	0	0	1	1
23	Chinese Taipei (TPE)	0	0	1	1
23	Dominican Republic (DOM)	0	0	1	1
23	Japan (JPN)	0	0	1	1
23	Poland (POL)	0	0	1	1
23	Vietnam (VIE)	0	0	1	1
Totals (28 entries)		32	32	56	120
