= Laetitia Aoun =

Lebanese taekwondo practitioner

Personal information
- National team: Lebanon
- Born: 14 April 2001 (age 25) Lebanon
- Height: 1.72 m (5 ft 8 in)
- Weight: 57 kg (126 lb)

Sport
- Country: Lebanon
- Sport: Taekwondo
Medal record
Women's taekwondo
Representing Lebanon
Asian Championships
Bronze medal – third place	2024 Da Nang	57 kg
Asian Games
Bronze medal – third place	2018 Jakarta	53 kg
Islamic Solidarity Games
Bronze medal – third place	2021 Konya	57 kg

Laetitia Aoun (born 14 April 2001) is a Lebanese taekwondo practitioner. She won one of the bronze medals in the women's 53 kg event at the 2018 Asian Games held in Jakarta, Indonesia.

In 2018, she also competed in the women's 57 kg event at the Mediterranean Games held in Tarragona, Catalonia, Spain where she was eliminated in her first match by Joana Cunha of Portugal.

She competed in the women's bantamweight event at the 2019 World Taekwondo Championships held in Manchester, United Kingdom where she was eliminated in her first match by Ewa Jamiołkowska of Poland.

In 2021, she competed at the Asian Olympic Qualification Tournament held in Amman, Jordan hoping to qualify for the 2020 Summer Olympics in Tokyo, Japan.

She competed in the women's featherweight event at the 2022 World Taekwondo Championships held in Guadalajara, Mexico.

She competed in the women's 57 kg event at the 2024 Summer Olympics in Paris, France.
