= Ali Al-Ahrach =

Moroccan jumper (born 1984)

Ali Al-Ahrach (born 5 July 1984) is a Moroccan equestrian, who has competed internationally for his country.

== Career highlights ==
Al-Ahrach was a gold medalist in team showjumping at the 2019 African Games in Rabat.

He qualified to represent Morocco at the 2020 Summer Olympics, where he competed as in the individual jumping and team jumping events.
