= Stacey Hymer =

Australian Taekwondo athlete

Stacey Hymer (born 2 July 1999) is a Taekwondo athlete from Australia.

== Career ==
Hymer was a fourth year Bachelor of Science student at RMIT University, when she was to compete in the 57 kg class Taekwondo at the Tokyo Olympics. She had previously won a gold medal at the 2018 Oceania Championships, and bronze medals at the 2019 French Open, 2019 Korean Open, and 2020 Dutch Open.

Hymer qualified for the Tokyo 2020 Olympics where she competed in the women's 57 kg class. She was leading world number 3 Skylar Park 12–6 before being overhauled by her opponent 25–15.

She competed in the women's featherweight event at the 2022 World Taekwondo Championships held in Guadalajara, Mexico.
