= Luo Zongshi =

Chinese Taekwondo practitioner

Personal information
- Nationality: Chinese
- Born: 14 October 1998 (age 27) Beihai, Guangxi, China
- Height: 182 cm (6 ft 0 in)
- Weight: 62 kg (137 lb)

Sport
- Sport: Taekwondo
- Coached by: Yan Ying
Medal record
Representing China
World Championships
| Gold medal – first place | 2022 Guadalajara | 57 kg |
| Bronze medal – third place | 2025 Wuxi | 57 kg |
Asian Championships
| Gold medal – first place | 2022 Chuncheon | 57 kg |
| Silver medal – second place | 2018 Ho Chi Minh City | 57 kg |
| Silver medal – second place | 2026 Ulaanbaatar | 62 kg |
Asian Games
| Gold medal – first place | 2018 Jakarta-Palembang | 57 kg |
| Gold medal – first place | 2022 Hangzhou | 57 kg |
Grand Prix
| Gold medal – first place | 2019 Moscow (F) | 57 kg |
| Gold medal – first place | 2022 Rome | 57 kg |
| Gold medal – first place | 2022 Paris | 57 kg |
| Gold medal – first place | 2022 Manchester | 57 kg |
| Gold medal – first place | 2022 Riyadh (F) | 57 kg |
| Gold medal – first place | 2023 Manchester (F) | 57 kg |
| Silver medal – second place | 2023 Paris | 57 kg |
| Bronze medal – third place | 2018 Taoyuan | 57 kg |
Grand Slam
| Gold medal – first place | 2022 Wuxi | 57 kg |
| Bronze medal – third place | 2017 Wuxi | 57 kg |
| Bronze medal – third place | 2019 Wuxi | 57 kg |
- Updated on 24 May 2026

Luo Zongshi (born 14 October 1998) is a Chinese taekwondo athlete. She won the gold medal in the women's featherweight event at the 2022 World Taekwondo Championships held in Guadalajara, Mexico. She also won the gold medal at the 2018 Asian Games in the women's featherweight event.
