= Patrycja Adamkiewicz =

Polish taekwondo practitioner

Personal information
- Nationality: Polish
- Born: 11 June 1998 (age 28) Jarocin, Poland
- Weight: 57 kg (126 lb)

Sport
- Sport: Taekwondo
- Event: –57 kg
- University team: Józef Piłsudski University of Physical Education in Warsaw
- Club: AZS-AWF Warszawa
Medal record
Representing Poland
Grand Prix
Bronze medal – third place	2017 London	57 kg
European Championships
Bronze medal – third place	2018 Kazan	57 kg
Universiade
Bronze medal – third place	2019 Naples	57 kg
Bronze medal – third place	2021 Chengdu	57 kg
Bronze medal – third place	2021 Chengdu	Team
European U21 Championships
Gold medal – first place	2017 Sofia	57 kg
Gold medal – first place	2018 Warsaw	57 kg
European Junior Championships
Silver medal – second place	2015 Daugavspils	55 kg
Bronze medal – third place	2013 Porto	46 kg
- Updated on 8 May 2021

Patrycja Adamkiewicz (born 11 June 1998) is a Polish taekwondo athlete.

== Career ==
In 2019 she won a bronze medal at the 2019 Summer Universiade at the women's featherweight event.

She qualified to the 2020 Summer Olympics through the 2021 European Taekwondo Olympic Qualification Tournament.

She competed in the women's featherweight event at the 2022 World Taekwondo Championships held in Guadalajara, Mexico.
