= Joana Cunha =

Portuguese taekwondo practitioner

Personal information
- Nationality: Portuguese
- Born: 19 October 1994 (age 31) Vila Nova de Gaia, Portugal
- Height: 177 cm (5 ft 10 in)
- Weight: 57 kg (126 lb)

Sport
- Country: Portugal
- Sport: Taekwondo
- Event: –57 kg
- Club: S.C. Braga
- Team: POR
- Coached by: Joaquim Peixoto
Medal record
Representing Portugal
Universiade
Silver medal – second place	2015 Gwangju	57 kg
Lusophony Games
Gold medal – first place	2014 Goa	57 kg
European U-21 Championships
Gold medal – first place	2014 Innsbruck	57 kg
- Updated on 02 November 2017

Joana Filipa da Silva Cunha (born 19 October 1994) is a Portuguese taekwondo female athlete. She won the silver medal at the 2015 Summer Universiade on the Women's featherweight category representing Portugal.

She competed in the women's featherweight event at the 2022 World Taekwondo Championships held in Guadalajara, Jalisco, Mexico.
