= Skylar Park =

Canadian taekwondo athlete

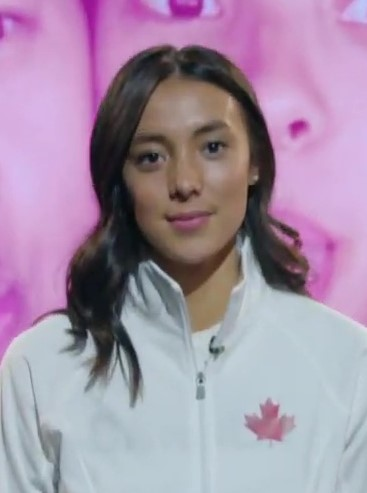
- Park in 2021 at the 2020 Summer Olympics

Personal information
- Full name: Skylar Mi-Young Zanetel Park
- Born: 6 June 1999 (age 27) Winnipeg, Manitoba, Canada
- Height: 178 cm (5 ft 10 in)
- Weight: 57 kg (126 lb)
- Relative: Tae-Ku Park

Sport
- Sport: Taekwondo
- Event: –57 kg
- Club: TRP Academy
- Team: CAN
- Coached by: Jae Park
Medal record
Women's taekwondo
Representing Canada
Olympic Games
Bronze medal – third place	2024 Paris	57 kg
World Championships
Bronze medal – third place	2019 Manchester	57 kg
Grand Prix
Gold medal – first place	2023 Taiyuan	57 kg
Silver medal – second place	2022 Paris	57 kg
Bronze medal – third place	2018 Rome	57 kg
Bronze medal – third place	2018 Manchester	57 kg
Bronze medal – third place	2019 Rome	57 kg
Bronze medal – third place	2022 Rome	57 kg
Bronze medal – third place	2022 Riyadh (F)	57 kg
Pan American Games
Gold medal – first place	2023 Santiago	57 kg
Silver medal – second place	2019 Lima	57 kg
Pan American Championships
Gold medal – first place	2018 Spokane	57 kg
Gold medal – first place	2021 Cancun	57 kg
Gold medal – first place	2022 Punta Cana	57 kg
Bronze medal – third place	2016 Queretaro	57 kg
World Junior Championships
Gold medal – first place	2016 Burnaby	59 kg
- Updated on 12 December 2022

Skylar Mi-Young Zanetel Park (/ˈskaɪl.ər ˈpɑːrk/; born 6 June 1999) is a Canadian taekwondo athlete. She is the reigning Pan American Games champion after she won gold in Santiago at the 2023 Pan American Games and won a bronze medal at the 2019 World Taekwondo Championships. Park also won the gold medal at the 2018 Pan American Taekwondo Championships on the women's 57 kg weight category. She represented Canada at the 2020 Summer Olympics in the women's 57 kg weight category. Park won Bronze at the 2024 Summer Olympics in Women's 57 kg Taekwondo.

== Career ==
Park started practicing taekwondo as a toddler and had earned her black belt at her parents' taekwondo school (TRP Academy) in Winnipeg by the age of seven.

She broke through in the taekwondo world when she won the gold medal on home soil at the 2016 World Taekwondo Junior Championships in Burnaby, Canada, where World Taekwondo released an article about her, after her performance naming her a "Star of Tomorrow". She would later say of her win the competition that " "I don't think I really realized before how big of a moment it would be if I won. "They named me 'the next new face of taekwondo.'" Following this, Park won her first major medal at the 2019 World Championships, taking a bronze after losing to Jade Jones in the semi-finals. Park was favoured to win a medal at the 2020 Summer Olympics though she suffered a loss in the quarterfinals, ending the medal hope.

She competed in the women's featherweight event at the 2022 World Taekwondo Championships held in Guadalajara, Mexico, losing in the round of 16. She also competed in the women's featherweight event at the 2023 World Taekwondo Championships held in Baku, Azerbaijan, where she lost again the round of 16 to Maria Clara Pachecho of Brazil. Park won her first Grand Prix title when she defeated world champion Nahid Kiani at the 2023 World Grand Prix event in Taiyuan, China. She began a winning streak when she won the Pan American President's Cup in September in preparation for the 2023 Pan American Games.

At the 2023 Pan Am Games, Park won her third event in a row, winning the gold by defeating Maria Clara Pachecho of Brazil who had defeated her that year at the world championships. After the win she said spoke of her earlier losses and rediscovered success saying that "after Tokyo, a lot of it for me was mental. Dealing with that pressure and expectations, having that belief [to succeed]. It's come together, and the confidence and belief is there now. A big thing is enjoying myself in the ring. When there's pressure, expectations and noise outside of what you're doing, it can, at times, become not fun. But the reason I was successful from a young age and why I love the sport is because I love to do it."

== Personal life ==
Her father is Korean and her mother was born in Chile and is of Italian heritage. Park's family has 16 black belts in taekwondo and the sport was practiced by her grandparents, her father, aunts, cousins, and brothers. She herself started practicing taekwondo at the age of 2. Her brother Tae-Ku Park won bronze at the same 2023 Pan American Games where she won her gold medal, which made them the first siblings in the sport to medal at the same Pan American Games.
