= Anastasija Zolotic =

American taekwondo athlete

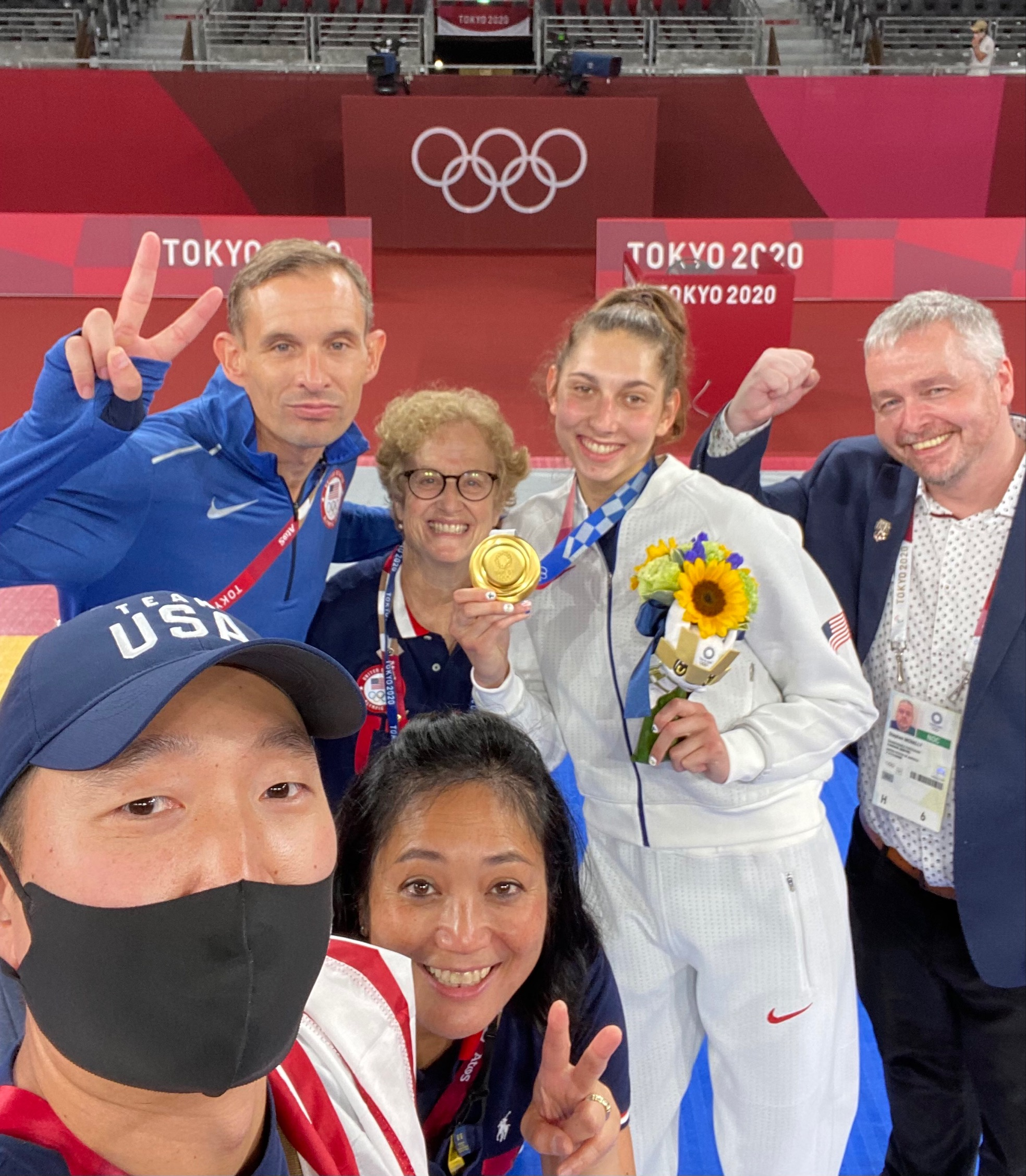
- Anastasija Zolotic at the 2020 Summer Olympics

Personal information
- Born: November 23, 2002 (age 23) Largo, Florida, United States
- Height: 5 ft 11 in (180 cm)
- Weight: 57 kg (126 lb)

Sport
- Country: United States
- Sport: Taekwondo
- Weight class: Lightweight; Featherweight
- Club: USA TKD
- Team: USA
- Coached by: Gareth Brown

Achievements and titles
- Olympic finals: (gold) (2020)
Medal record
Representing United States
Olympic Games
Gold medal – first place	2020 Tokyo	57 kg
Grand Prix
Bronze medal – third place	2019 Rome	57 kg
Bronze medal – third place	2019 Moscow (F)	57 kg
Bronze medal – third place	2022 Rome	57 kg
Bronze medal – third place	2022 Manchester	57 kg
Pan American Games
Gold medal – first place	2019 Lima	57 kg
Pan American Championships
Silver medal – second place	2021 Cancún	62 kg
Youth Olympic Games
Silver medal – second place	2018 Buenos Aires	49 kg
World Junior Championships
Gold medal – first place	2018 Hammamet	52 kg
- Updated on 11 December 2022

Anastasija Zolotic (Serbian Cyrillic: Анастасија Золотић, romanized: Anastasija Zolotić (born 23 November 2002) is an American taekwondo athlete and Olympic gold medalist. She won the silver medal at the 2018 Summer Youth Olympics in the girls 49 kg weight class. She qualified to represent the United States at the 2020 Summer Olympics. On Sunday 25 July 2021, at just 18-years-old, she became the first American woman to win Olympic gold in taekwondo, defeating Tatiana Minina of Russia 25 to 17. She competed in the women's featherweight event at the 2022 World Taekwondo Championships held in Guadalajara, Mexico.

== Medal record ==
=== Olympic Games ===
Year	Location	Event	Position
2021	Tokyo, Japan	Taekwondo	1st

== Personal life ==
Zolotic was born in the United States to parents who immigrated from Bosnia and Herzegovina. Her father practiced taekwondo in his youth and inspired her to take up the sport. She and her sister participated in after-school taekwondo programs from a young age, with Zolotic’s interest intensifying as she began to watch and then join competitive training sessions. She would eventually move to Colorado to train full-time at the Olympic Training Center, which significantly shaped her approach to the sport, emphasizing discipline, proper nutrition, and recovery.

== See also ==
- List of Olympic medalists in taekwondo
