= Nahid Kiani =

Iranian taekwondo practitioner

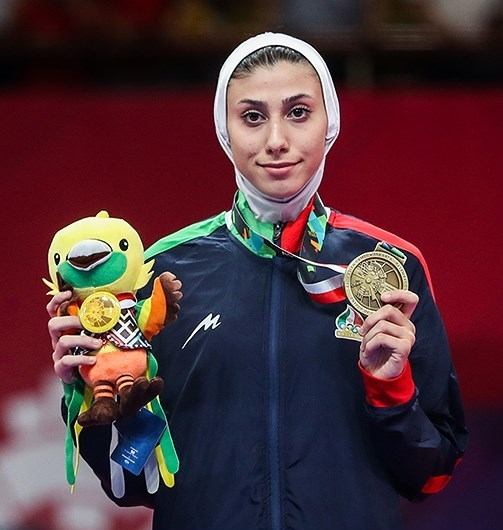
- Kiani at the Asian Games 2018
- Born: Nahid Kiani Chandeh; 1 August 1998 (age 28); Isfahan, Iran
- Native name: ناهید کیانی
- Height: 173 cm (5 ft 8 in)
- Weight: 57 kg (126 lb; 9 st 0 lb)
- Style: Taekwondo
- Last updated on: 24 May 2026

Nahid Kiani Chandeh (Persian: ناهید کیانی, born 1 August 1998 in Isfahan) is an Iranian taekwondo athlete. She is the first Iranian woman to win a silver medal at the Olympics in the 2024 Summer Olympics, Taekwondo Women's 57 kg event, also she won the gold medal in the women's bantamweight event at the 2023 World Taekwondo Championships.

== Personal life ==
Kiani is from Bakhtiari people and grew up in Isfahan. She started taekwondo when she was eight years old with her sister Mahtab Kiani.

== Career ==
She won bronze medals at the 2016 Asian Championships and 2018 Asian Games. She competed at the 2020 Summer Olympics where she was eliminated by Kimia Alizadeh.

She competed at the 2024 Summer Olympics and won a silver medal in the 57 kg event.

=== Tokyo 2020 Olympics ===
At the Tokyo 2020 Olympic qualification event in the 57 kg weight category, Nahid Kiani secured a gold medal and an Olympic spot by defeating her Jordanian opponent. During the Tokyo 2020 Olympics, Kiani faced a controversial match against Kimia Alizadeh, a former Iranian taekwondo athlete competing for the Refugee Team. Kiani lost the match and was subsequently eliminated from the competition.

=== Paris 2024 Olympics ===
Kiani qualified for the Paris 2024 Olympics by ranking among the top five in the Olympic rankings of the World Taekwondo Federation in the women's 57 kg weight category. In her first match at the Olympics, she once again faced Kimia Alizadeh. Despite losing the first round 10–7, Kiani won the next two rounds with scores of 6-5 and 7-7, advancing to the next stage. Kiani then defeated opponents from Tunisia and Lebanon in the quarterfinals and semifinals to reach the final match. In the final, she faced South Korea's Kim Yu-jin and earned a silver medal. This achievement made her the third Iranian woman to win an Olympic medal and the highest-ranking female Iranian Olympian with a silver medal.

== Honors and medals ==
- Bronze Medal at the World Junior Championships in Taipei, China (2014)
- Gold Medal at the Asian Junior Championships in Taipei, China (2015)
- Bronze Medal at the 2016 Asian Taekwondo Championships in the Philippines
- Gold Medal at the 2017 Islamic Solidarity Games in Baku
- Bronze Medal at the 2017 Summer Universiade (Seniors) in Taiwan
- Bronze Medal at the 2018 Asian Games in Indonesia
- Bronze Medal at the 2018 World Taekwondo President's Cup in Iran
- Silver Medal at the 2018 Asian Taekwondo Championships in Vietnam
- Gold Medal at the 2019 International Fajr Tournament (Seniors) in Iran
- Gold Medal and secured a spot at the 2020 Tokyo Olympics in the Olympic Qualification Tournament in Jordan (2021)
- Silver Medal at the 2021 International Fajr Cup in Tehran
- Gold Medal at the 2021 Asian Open Championships in Tehran
- Gold Medal at the 2021 Islamic Solidarity Games in Konya (2022)
- Gold Medal at the 2023 World Taekwondo Championships in Baku
- Silver Medal at the 2023 Rome Grand Prix
- Silver Medal at the 2024 Paris Olympics
