= Hatice Kübra İlgün =

Turkish taekwondo practitioner (born 1993)

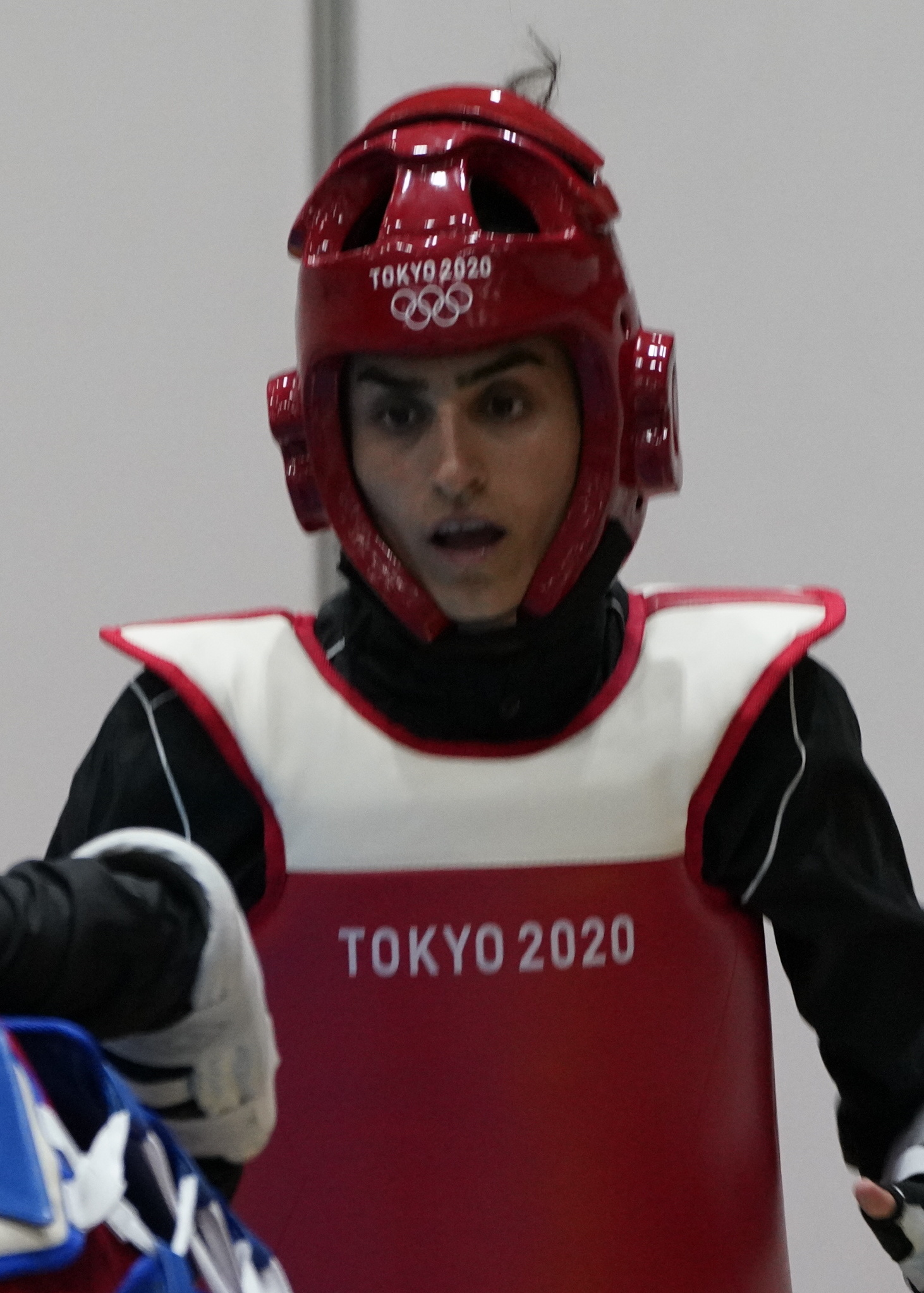
- İlgün at the 2020 Summer Olympics

Personal information
- Born: 1 January 1993 (age 33) Kars, Turkey
- Education: Uludağ University
- Height: 175 cm (5 ft 9 in)
- Weight: 57 kg (126 lb)

Sport
- Country: Turkey
- Sport: Taekwondo
- Events: Featherweight, 57 kg
- Club: Bursa BB Spor Club
- Coached by: Fikret Temuçin
Medal record
Women's taekwondo
Representing Turkey
Olympic Games
Bronze medal – third place	2020 Tokyo	57 kg
World Championships
Silver medal – second place	2017 Muju	57 kg
Bronze medal – third place	2022 Guadalajara	57 kg
Bronze medal – third place	2023 Baku	57 kg
European Championships
Gold medal – first place	2022 Manchester	57 kg
Silver medal – second place	2018 Kazan	57 kg
Silver medal – second place	2021 Sofia	57 kg
Bronze medal – third place	2026 Munich	57 kg
Grand Prix
Gold medal – first place	2017 Rabat	57 kg
Gold medal – first place	2019 Chiba	57 kg
Silver medal – second place	2019 Moscow (F)	57 kg
Silver medal – second place	2019 Rome	57 kg
Silver medal – second place	2022 Riyadh (F)	57 kg
Bronze medal – third place	2018 Moscow	57 kg
Bronze medal – third place	2019 Sofia	57 kg
Bronze medal – third place	2022 Manchester	57 kg
Bronze medal – third place	2023 Paris	57 kg
Grand Slam (Qualification)
Silver medal – second place	2018 Wuxi (I)	57 kg
European Games
Bronze medal – third place	2023 Kraków-Małopolska	57 kg
Islamic Solidarity Games
Silver medal – second place	2021 Konya	57 kg
Silver medal – second place	2025 Riyadh	57 kg
Mediterranean Games
Gold medal – first place	2022 Oran	57 kg
Gold medal – first place	2026 Taranto	57 kg
Silver medal – second place	2013 Mersin	57 kg
World University Games
Gold medal – first place	2017 Taipei	57 kg
European Junior Championships
Bronze medal – third place	2013 Porto	57 kg

Hatice Kübra İlgün (born 1 January 1993) is a Turkish taekwondo practitioner. She has won a silver medal at the 2017 World Taekwondo Championships in the featherweight division, and a bronze medal at the 2020 Summer Olympics.

== Sport career ==
Hatice Kübra İlgün left it until the final second of her under-57 kilograms featherweight final to win the World Taekwondo Grand Prix in Chibas in September 2019.

A high, round kick to the head of Morocco's Nada Laraaj turned a 3-2 deficit into a 4-3 winning margin for the 26-year-old Turkish fighter whose career was gathering momentum up to the point where competition had to be held up because of the 2020 coronavirus pandemic. İlgün started taekwondo 14-years-ago though a family contact.

She earned second place in the senior under-49 kg event at the Dutch Open aged 16. The following year, she was under-57 kg bronze medallist at the European Under-21 Championships in Chișinău and senior titles soon followed in the Turkish, Ukraine and Moldova Open events.

In 2017, she took another significant step-up as she won under-57 kg silver at the World Championships in Muju, losing 7-5 to South Korea's Lee Ah-reum, who had beaten Britain's Olympic champion Jade Jones in the semi-final.

Before the year was over she had won gold at the Summer Universiade in Taipei, and she followed up by earning her first Grand Prix title in Rabat.

At the 2018 European Championships in Kazan she added another medal to her collection as she earned silver, losing to Jones in the final.

Her Chiba win was preceded by silver at the Rome Grand Prix, and followed by bronze at the Sofia Grand Prix and a silver in the Grand Prix Final in Moscow.

She continued into 2020 in the same vein, winning the Fujairah Open and WT Presidents Cup - Europe in Helsingborg before taking bronze at the German Open.

Qualification for the next Olympics has been amply secured.

Hatice Kübra Ilgün managed to win 8-6 in the final for third place against Alizadeh Zenoorin Kimia, the fighter of the Olympic Refugee Team (EOR), in the women’s category of – 57 kg during the Tokyo 2020 Olympic Games. İlgün won the first round 3-2, and continued her form in the second round with a 2-0 win, taking the total score to 4-3. İlgün clinched the last round 4-3 and won the match with an 8-6 score.

She won the gold medal in the women's 57 kg event at the 2022 Mediterranean Games held in Oran, Algeria. She won one of the bronze medals in the women's featherweight event at the 2022 World Taekwondo Championships held in Guadalajara, Mexico.

Hatice Kübra İlgün, who passed the first round in the women's women's featherweight category at the 2023 World Taekwondo Championships in Baku, Azerbaijan, defeated Nadine Mahmoud of Egypt in the second round and Arlet Ortiz of Spain in the third round. Ilgün, who defeated Poland's Patrycja Adamkiewicz in the quarterfinals, lost to Taiwan's Lo Chia-ling in the semifinals and became the third in the world and won a bronze medal.

== Tournament record ==
Year	Event	Location	G-Rank	Place
2022	European Championships	(United Kingdom) Manchester	G-4	1st
2022	Spanish Open	(Spain) La Nucia	G-1	1st
2022	Turkish Open	(Turkey) Antalya	G-1	2nd
2022	WT Presidents Cup - Europe	(Albania) Durrës	G-1	3rd
2021	Olympic Games	(Japan) Tokyo	G-20	3rd
2021	European Championships	(Bulgaria) Sofia	G-4	2nd
2021	WT Presidents Cup - Europe	(Albania) Durrës	G-1	3rd
2020	WT Presidents Cup - Europe	(Sweden) Helsingborg	G-1	1st
2020	European Clubs Championships	(Croatia) Zagreb	G-1	1st
2020	Fujairah Open	(United Arab Emirates) Fujairah	G-1	1st
2020	German Open	(Germany) Hamburg	G-1	3rd
2019	Grand Prix	(Japan) Chiba	G-4	1st
2019	Grand Prix	(Italy) Rome	G-4	2nd
2019	Grand Prix	(Russia) Moscow	G-8	2nd
2019	Grand Prix	(Bulgaria) Sofia	G-4	3rd
2019	Spanish Open	(Spain) Castellón de la Plana	G-4	1st
2019	US Open	(United States) Las Vegas	G-1	1st
2019	WT Presidents Cup - Europe	(Turkey) Antalya	G-1	1st
2019	Asian Open	(Vietnam) Ho Chi Minh City	G-1	2nd
2019	Dutch Open	(Netherlands) Nijmegen	G-1	3rd
2018	Grand Prix	(Russia) Moscow	G-4	3rd
2018	Grand Slam - Qualification	(China) Wuxi	G-4	2nd
2018	European Championships	(Russia) Kazan	G-4	2nd
2018	European Clubs Championships	(Turkey) Istanbul	G-1	1st
2018	Turkish Open	(Turkey) Istanbul	G-1	1st
2018	Egypt Open	(Egypt) Alexandria	G-1	1st
2018	Sofia Open	(Bulgaria) Sofia	G-1	1st
2018	WT Presidents Cup - Europe	(Greece) Athens	G-1	1st
2017	World Championships	(Morocco) Rabat	G-12	2nd
2017	Grand Prix	(Morocco) Rabat	G-4	1st
2017	Universiade	(Chinese Taipei) Taipei	G-2	1st
2017	European Clubs Championships	(Turkey) Antalya	G-1	1st
2017	Moldova Open	(Moldova) Ciorescu	G-1	2nd
2017	Turkish Open	(Turkey) Antalya	G-1	3rd
2017	WT Presidents Cup - Europe	(Greece) Athens	G-1	3rd
2016	WT Presidents Cup - Europe	(Germany) Bonn	G-1	1st
2016	Greece Open	(Greece) Thessaloniki	G-1	1st
2016	Palestine Open	(Palestine) Ramallah	G-1	1st
2016	Israel Open	(Israel) Ramla	G-1	1st
2016	European Clubs Championships	(Turkey) Antalya	G-1	3rd
2016	Turkish Open	(Turkey) Antalya	G-1	3rd
2016	Serbia Open	(Serbia) Belgrade	G-1	3rd
2015	Ukraine Open	(Ukraine) Kharkov	G-1	1st
2015	Moldova Open	(Moldova) Chișinău	G-1	1st
2014	Turkish Open	(Turkey) Antalya	G-1	1st
2013	Mediterranean Games	(Turkey) Mersin	G-4	2nd
2013	European U-21 Championships	(Moldova) Chișinău	G-4	3rd
2013	German Open	(Germany) Hamburg	G-1	3rd
2010	Dutch Open	(Netherlands) Eindhoven	G-1	2nd
2009	German Open	(Germany) Hamburg	G-1	1st
