= 2022 World Taekwondo Championships – Women's bantamweight =

Taekwondo competitions

Women's bantamweight at the 2022 World Championships
- Venue: Centro Acuático CODE Metropolitano
- Dates: 18 November 2022
- Competitors: 44 from 44 nations

Medalists
gold medal	Makayla Greenwood	United States
silver medal	Zuo Ju	China
bronze medal	Tijana Bogdanović	Serbia
bronze medal	Ivana Duvančić	Croatia

The women's bantamweight is a competition featured at the 2022 World Taekwondo Championships, and was held at the Centro Acuático CODE Metropolitano in Guadalajara, Mexico on 18 November 2022. Bantamweights were limited to a maximum of 53 kilograms in body mass.

== Results ==
Legend

- DQ — Won by disqualification
- P — Won by punitive declaration

=== Finals ===
Semifinals				Final
Makayla Greenwood (USA)	2	2	2
Tijana Bogdanović (SRB)	4	2	1	Makayla Greenwood (USA)	2	1	8
Zuo Ju (CHN)	4	4		Zuo Ju (CHN)	2	4	5
Ivana Duvančić (CRO)	3	4

=== Top half ===
==== Section 1 ====
Round of 64
Andrialis Bonilla (DOM)	4	4
Aziza Karajanova (KAZ)	4	5
Selen Gündüz (BUL)	7	4
Jessica Canabal (PHI)	4	3
Lucero Gómez (COL)	6	6	10
Tamzin Christoffel (AUS)	6	3	4

Round of 32
Fabiola Villegas (MEX)	4	9	4
Aziza Karajanova (KAZ)	2	9	3
Tamara Robles (CUB)	8	0	12
Biana Lager (ISR)	3	3	4
Talisca Reis (BRA)	3	2	3
Selen Gündüz (BUL)	0	8	2
Lucero Gómez (COL)	0	1
Makayla Greenwood (USA)	13	5

Round of 16
Fabiola Villegas (MEX)	2	9	7
Tamara Robles (CUB)	1	22	6
Talisca Reis (BRA)	4	0	1
Makayla Greenwood (USA)	2	14	7

Quarterfinals
Fabiola Villegas (MEX)	0	5	1
Makayla Greenwood (USA)	1	0	2

==== Section 2 ====
Round of 64
Chrisley Olivas (NCA)	D	Q
~~Eunice Adedapo (GHA)~~
Phannapa Harnsujin (THA)	D	Q
~~Maimouna Ousseïni (NIG)~~
Sophia Fokas (CAN)	0	0
Sitora Ergashova (UZB)	6	3

Round of 32
Zeliha Ağrıs (TUR)	2	7
Chrisley Olivas (NCA)	2	0
Phannapa Harnsujin (THA)	10	5
Dominika Hronová (CZE)	6	2
Keishlie Santiago (PUR)	1	5
Mao Nishida (JPN)	4	10
Sitora Ergashova (UZB)	1	3	1
Tijana Bogdanović (SRB)	0	8	3

Round of 16
Zeliha Ağrıs (TUR)	1	2
Phannapa Harnsujin (THA)	2	6
Mao Nishida (JPN)	0	0
Tijana Bogdanović (SRB)	3	6

Quarterfinals
Phannapa Harnsujin (THA)	0	0
Tijana Bogdanović (SRB)	7	9

=== Bottom half ===
==== Section 3 ====
Round of 64
~~Yapa Koralalage Madushani (SRI)~~
Bouma Coulibaly (CIV)	D	Q
~~Hadja Barry (GUI)~~
Gabriela Briškárová (SVK)	D	Q
Amina Hammich (NOR)	0	1
Jodie McKew (GBR)	2	8

Round of 32
Ela Aydin (GER)	0	7
Bouma Coulibaly (CIV)	0	2
Chaima Toumi (TUN)	1	3
Su Po-ya (TPE)	2	4
Zuo Ju (CHN)	8	11
Gabriela Briškárová (SVK)	0	2
Jodie McKew (GBR)	1	4
Nahid Kiani (IRI)	4	12

Round of 16
Ela Aydin (GER)	2	2
Su Po-ya (TPE)	6	7
Zuo Ju (CHN)	7^{P}	8
Nahid Kiani (IRI)	8	3

Quarterfinals
Su Po-ya (TPE)	9	5	4
Zuo Ju (CHN)	2	10	8

==== Section 4 ====
Round of 64
Park Hye-jin (KOR)	5	6
Louise Lyngbæk (DEN)	3	3
Lea Höglinger (AUT)	3	13	6
Athanasia Tsallou (GRE)	5	3	4
~~Maïmouna Konaté (MLI)~~
Law Sin Yi (HKG)	D	Q

Round of 32
Oumaima El-Bouchti (MAR)	0	0
Park Hye-jin (KOR)	7	7
Lea Höglinger (AUT)	1	6
Ivana Duvančić (CRO)	6	14
~~Inese Tarvida (LAT)~~
Gerda Meištininkaitė (LTU)	D	Q
Law Sin Yi (HKG)	3	1
Alma Pérez (ESP)	8	8

Round of 16
Park Hye-jin (KOR)	1	2
Ivana Duvančić (CRO)	5	10
Gerda Meištininkaitė (LTU)	1	0
Alma Pérez (ESP)	7	8

Quarterfinals
Ivana Duvančić (CRO)	5	3	3
Alma Pérez (ESP)	3	9	3
