= 2019 World Taekwondo Championships – Women's bantamweight =

Women's bantamweight at the 2019 World Championships
- Venue: Manchester Arena
- Dates: 18–19 May 2019
- Competitors: 53 from 53 nations

Medalists
| gold medal | Phannapa Harnsujin | Thailand |
| silver medal | Tatiana Kudashova | Russia |
| bronze medal | Aaliyah Powell | Great Britain |
| bronze medal | Inese Tarvida | Latvia |

The Women's bantamweight is a competition featured at the 2019 World Taekwondo Championships, and was held at the Manchester Arena in Manchester, United Kingdom on 18 and 19 May. Bantamweight were limited to a maximum of 53 kilograms in body mass.

== Results ==
Legend

- DQ — Won by disqualification

=== Finals ===
| Semifinals | | Final |
| Tatiana Kudashova (RUS) | 38 |
| Aaliyah Powell (GBR) | 5 | Tatiana Kudashova (RUS) | 10 |
| Phannapa Harnsujin (THA) | 20 | Phannapa Harnsujin (THA) | 20 |
| Inese Tarvida (LAT) | 17 |

=== Top half ===
==== Section 1 ====
Round of 64
Luna Abu Eisheh (JOR) | 9
Nathalia Dinis (BRA) | 6
Latika Bhandari (IND) | DQ
~~Dunya Abutaleb (KSA)~~
Shania Magro (MLT) | 1
Despina Pilavaki (CYP) | 30
Tamara Zlatkovic (FGT) | 7
Anastasija Zolotic (USA) | 30
Laetitia Aoun (LBN) | 7
Ewa Jamiołkowska (POL) | 14

Round of 32
Tatiana Kudashova (RUS) | 23
Luna Abu Eisheh (JOR) | 6
Latika Bhandari (IND) | 4
Despina Pilavaki (CYP) | 10
Lim Geum-byeol (KOR) | 9
Anastasija Zolotic (USA) | 29
Ewa Jamiołkowska (POL) | 6
Su Po-ya (TPE) | 22

Round of 16
Tatiana Kudashova (RUS) | 24
Despina Pilavaki (CYP) | 2
Anastasija Zolotic (USA) | 9
Su Po-ya (TPE) | 18

Quarterfinals
Tatiana Kudashova (RUS) | 14
Su Po-ya (TPE) | 13

==== Section 2 ====
Round of 64
Ericka Aly (GDL) | 21
Charlotte Brown (CAN) | 22
Fariza Aldangorova (KAZ) | 24
Keishlie Santiago (PUR) | 18
Mahiro Eguchi (JPN) | 2
Oumaima El-Bouchti (MAR) | 23
Christianna Tyrologou (GRE) | 24
Jennifer Lay (TLS) | 0
Vũ Thị Dung (VIE) | 7
Chinazum Nwosu (NGR) | 12
Ana Petrušić (SLO) | 31
Lorena Cabel (ESP) | 19

Round of 32
Madeline Folgmann (GER) | 11
Charlotte Brown (CAN) | 8
Fariza Aldangorova (KAZ) | 3
Oumaima El-Bouchti (MAR) | 23
Christianna Tyrologou (GRE) | 3
Chinazum Nwosu (NGR) | 0
Ana Petrušić (SLO) | 6
Aaliyah Powell (GBR) | 12

Round of 16
Madeline Folgmann (GER) | 10
Oumaima El-Bouchti (MAR) | 11
Christianna Tyrologou (GRE) | 7
Aaliyah Powell (GBR) | 9

Quarterfinals
Oumaima El-Bouchti (MAR) | 16
Aaliyah Powell (GBR) | 22

=== Bottom half ===
==== Section 3 ====
Round of 64
Yasmina Aziez (FRA) | 7
Wenren Yuntao (CHN) | 8
Phannapa Harnsujin (THA) | 18
Ana Taslak (CRO) | 10
Carmen Marton (AUS) | 18
Mariska Halinda (INA) | 10
Rheza Aragon (PHI) | 8
Christina Schönegger (AUT) | 4
Fabiola Villegas (MEX) | 18
Coumba Ndoye (SEN) | 10

Round of 32
Tijana Bogdanović (SRB) | 13
Wenren Yuntao (CHN) | 20
Phannapa Harnsujin (THA) | 16
Carmen Marton (AUS) | 3
Luca Patakfalvy (HUN) | 13
Rheza Aragon (PHI) | 11
Fabiola Villegas (MEX) | 28
Zeliha Ağrıs (TUR) | 27

Round of 16
Wenren Yuntao (CHN) | 6
Phannapa Harnsujin (THA) | 8
Luca Patakfalvy (HUN) | 12
Fabiola Villegas (MEX) | 16

Quarterfinals
Phannapa Harnsujin (THA) | 24
Fabiola Villegas (MEX) | 23

==== Section 4 ====
Round of 64
Rim Bayaa (SWE) | 3
Erica Nicoli (ITA) | 11
Gabriela Briškárová (SVK) | 6
Aneila Aysha Afsar (PAK) | 16
Laura García (COL) | 22
Munirah Abdiwahid (SOM) | 2
Patrícia Frois (POR) | 0
Charos Kayumova (UZB) | 21
Tatiana Miccoli (SUI) | 6
Liana Musteaţă (ROU) | 9

Round of 32
Sarah Malykke (DEN) | 11
Erica Nicoli (ITA) | 17
Aneila Aysha Afsar (PAK) | 10
Rahma Ben Ali (TUN) | 32
Laura García (COL) | 6
Charos Kayumova (UZB) | 23
Liana Musteaţă (ROU) | 4
Inese Tarvida (LAT) | 15

Round of 16
Erica Nicoli (ITA) | 21
Rahma Ben Ali (TUN) | 7
Charos Kayumova (UZB) | 19
Inese Tarvida (LAT) | 32

Quarterfinals
Erica Nicoli (ITA) | 4
Inese Tarvida (LAT) | 30
