= 2015 World Taekwondo Championships – Women's bantamweight =

Taekwondo competition

Women's bantamweight at the 2015 World Championships
- Venue: Traktor Ice Arena
- Dates: 15–16 May 2015
- Competitors: 49 from 48 nations

Medalists
gold medal	Lim Geum-byeol	South Korea
silver medal	Huang Yun-wen	Chinese Taipei
bronze medal	Ana Zaninović	Croatia
bronze medal	Andriana Asprogeraka	Greece

The women's bantamweight is a competition featured at the 2015 World Taekwondo Championships, and was held at the Traktor Ice Arena in Chelyabinsk, Russia on May 15 and May 16. Bantamweights were limited to a maximum of 53 kilograms in body mass.

== Results ==
Legend

- DQ — Won by disqualification

=== Finals ===
Semifinals		Final
Huang Yun-wen (TPE)	12
Ana Zaninović (CRO)	4	Huang Yun-wen (TPE)	5
Lim Geum-byeol (KOR)	7	Lim Geum-byeol (KOR)	10
Andriana Asprogeraka (GRE)	1

=== Top half ===
==== Section 1 ====
Round of 64
Dinorahon Mamadibragimova (UZB)	DQ
~~Stephanie Rabehaja (MAD)~~
Madeline Folgmann (GER)	7
Katsiaryna Lis (BLR)	1
Melissa Joseph (TTO)	2
Caroline Marton (AUS)	20
Lu Jing Rong (MAC)	1
Georgia Barnes (GBR)	14
Danielle Pelham (GHA)	5
Taleen Hamaidi (JOR)	6

Round of 32
Huang Yun-wen (TPE)	17
Dinorahon Mamadibragimova (UZB)	5
Madeline Folgmann (GER)	3
Caroline Marton (AUS)	4
Suvi Mikkonen (FIN)	12
Georgia Barnes (GBR)	5
Taleen Hamaidi (JOR)	2
Manuela Bezzola (SUI)	3

Round of 16
Huang Yun-wen (TPE)	13
Caroline Marton (AUS)	1
Suvi Mikkonen (FIN)	8
Manuela Bezzola (SUI)	7

Quarterfinals
Huang Yun-wen (TPE)	18
Suvi Mikkonen (FIN)	10

==== Section 2 ====
Round of 64
Erendita Gërguri (KOS)	3
Fariza Aldangorova (KAZ)	10
~~Disnansi Polanco (DOM)~~
Ada Demneri (ALB)	DQ
Zhan Tianrui (CHN)	13
Awa Ouattara (CIV)	0
Lazara Valdes (AZE)	7
Emmanuella Atora (GAB)	5

Round of 32
Ana Zaninović (CRO)	11
Fariza Aldangorova (KAZ)	7
Ada Demneri (ALB)	8
Laura García (COL)	9
Charlotte Brown (CAN)	8
Zhan Tianrui (CHN)	12
Lazara Valdes (AZE)	2
Ekaterina Kim (RUS)	6

Round of 16
Ana Zaninović (CRO)	9
Laura García (COL)	2
Zhan Tianrui (CHN)	9
Ekaterina Kim (RUS)	1

Quarterfinals
Ana Zaninović (CRO)	4
Zhan Tianrui (CHN)	3

=== Bottom half ===
==== Section 3 ====
Round of 64
Yarden Sharabi (ISR)	2
Barbara Ducz (HUN)	9
Pauline Lopez (PHI)	10
Belaynesh Alemu (ETH)	4
Samantha Leong (USA)	9
Tania García (ESP)	7
Lim Geum-byeol (KOR)	7
Pauline Lövgren (SWE)	0

Round of 32
Floriane Liborio (FRA)	3
Barbara Ducz (HUN)	4
Pauline Lopez (PHI)	5
Indra Craen (WTF)	13
Rahma Ben Ali (TUN)	5
Samantha Leong (USA)	6
Lim Geum-byeol (KOR)	4
Diana Lara (MEX)	2

Round of 16
Barbara Ducz (HUN)	8
Indra Craen (WTF)	7
Samantha Leong (USA)	6
Lim Geum-byeol (KOR)	14

Quarterfinals
Barbara Ducz (HUN)	4
Lim Geum-byeol (KOR)	6

==== Section 4 ====
Round of 64
Andriana Asprogeraka (GRE)	20
Tamana Frotan (AFG)	1
Daria Lytvynchuk (UKR)	4
Licia Martignani (ITA)	0
Alessandra Trevisan (BRA)	0
Yamicel Núñez (CUB)	8
~~Jasmin Nabila (MAS)~~
Phannapa Harnsujin (THA)	DQ

Round of 32
Hatice Kübra Yangın (TUR)	9
Andriana Asprogeraka (GRE)	11
Daria Lytvynchuk (UKR)	5
Dragana Gladović (SRB)	4
Despina Pilavaki (CYP)	2
Yamicel Núñez (CUB)	7
Phannapa Harnsujin (THA)	12
Radwa Reda (EGY)	6

Round of 16
Andriana Asprogeraka (GRE)	5
Daria Lytvynchuk (UKR)	4
Yamicel Núñez (CUB)	9
Phannapa Harnsujin (THA)	4

Quarterfinals
Andriana Asprogeraka (GRE)	5
Yamicel Núñez (CUB)	4
