= 2023 World Taekwondo Championships – Women's bantamweight =

Taekwondo competitions

Women's bantamweight at the 2023 World Championships
- Venue: Baku Crystal Hall
- Dates: 4 June 2023
- Competitors: 50 from 49 nations

Medalists
gold medal	Nahid Kiani	Iran
silver medal	Zuo Ju	China
bronze medal	Shahd El-Hosseiny	Egypt
bronze medal	Tatiana Minina	Individual Neutral Athletes

The women's bantamweight is a competition featured at the 2023 World Taekwondo Championships, and was held at the Baku Crystal Hall in Baku, Azerbaijan on 4 June 2023. Bantamweights were limited to a maximum of 53 kilograms in body mass.

== Results ==
Legend

- R — Won by referee stop contest

=== Finals ===
Semifinals				Final
Zuo Ju (CHN)	9	8
Shahd El-Hosseiny (EGY)	2	2		Zuo Ju (CHN)	0	7
Tatiana Minina (AIN)	4	14	6	Nahid Kiani (IRI)	14	10
Nahid Kiani (IRI)	5	6	10

=== Top half ===
==== Section 1 ====
Round of 64
Megan Brewster (CAN)	6	2
Sitora Ergashova (UZB)	15	6
Mao Nishida (JPN)	9	13
Lara Gonçalves (POR)	3	1
Zeynep Taşkın (TUR)	7	8
Phannapa Harnsujin (THA)	2	2
Georgiana Mihai (ROU)	1	1
Ilenia Matonti (ITA)	2	8
Aziza Karajanova (KAZ)	11	16
Nagia Kaourtishi (CYP)	8	2

Round of 32
Zuo Ju (CHN)	9	10
Sitora Ergashova (UZB)	2	8
Mao Nishida (JPN)	1	5
Zeynep Taşkın (TUR)	9	15
Su Po-ya (TPE)	0	4	11
Ilenia Matonti (ITA)	1	4	2
Aziza Karajanova (KAZ)	7	3	8
Larissa Rossi (BRA)	4	10	5

Round of 16
Zuo Ju (CHN)	5	12
Zeynep Taşkın (TUR)	3	10
Su Po-ya (TPE)	8	11
Aziza Karajanova (KAZ)	6	1

Quarterfinals
Zuo Ju (CHN)	10	3	9
Su Po-ya (TPE)	9	10	8

==== Section 2 ====
Round of 64
Ayasha Lama (NEP)	7	3
Munirah Abdiwahid (SOM)	11	6
Shahd El-Hosseiny (EGY)	15	15
So Yuen Ting (HKG)	3	3
Mariami Melikishvili (GEO)	1	0
Louise Lyngbæk (DEN)	9	7
Mariella Bou Habib (LBN)	4	8	8
Lesly Mendoza (COL)	6	3	3

Round of 32
Alma Pérez (ESP)	16	9
Munirah Abdiwahid (SOM)	3	1
Shahd El-Hosseiny (EGY)	6	14
Dominika Hronová (CZE)	0	4
Keishlie Santiago (PUR)	7	13
Louise Lyngbæk (DEN)	2	2
Mariella Bou Habib (LBN)	11	10	12
Samarrukh Osmanova (AZE)	4	10	11

Round of 16
Alma Pérez (ESP)	5	0	1
Shahd El-Hosseiny (EGY)	0	12	7
Keishlie Santiago (PUR)	6	14
Mariella Bou Habib (LBN)	7	17

Quarterfinals
Shahd El-Hosseiny (EGY)	5	4	5
Mariella Bou Habib (LBN)	6	2	2

=== Bottom half ===
==== Section 3 ====
Round of 64
Francine Bidzono (CMR)	5	4	7
Latika Bhandari (IND)	1	13	10
Gabriela Briškárová (SVK)	3	0	4
Maria Tzeli (GRE)	2	6	2
Ashley Valerio (USA)	5	5
Jessica Canabal (PHI)	5	11
Selen Gündüz (BUL)	4	11	6
Julie Mam (CAM)	6	9	7

Round of 32
Oumaima El-Bouchti (MAR)	7	5	7
Latika Bhandari (IND)	7	1	5
Gabriela Briškárová (SVK)	2	2
Biana Lager (ISR)	9	11
Tatiana Minina (AIN)	12	18
Jessica Canabal (PHI)	0	4
Julie Mam (CAM)	3	1	1
Tijana Bogdanović (SRB)	3	6	0

Round of 16
Oumaima El-Bouchti (MAR)	10	7
Biana Lager (ISR)	1	2
Tatiana Minina (AIN)	3^{R}
Julie Mam (CAM)	0

Quarterfinals
Oumaima El-Bouchti (MAR)	5	0
Tatiana Minina (AIN)	14	2

==== Section 4 ====
Round of 64
Mama Ndiaye (SEN)	8	8
In Su-wan (KOR)	13	20
Carla Godoy (ARG)	8	9
Kayla Murray (IRL)	0	3
Nika Karabatić (CRO)	15	15
Molly Park (AUS)	3	3
Supharada Kisskalt (GER)	0	1
Chaima Toumi (TUN)	7	10
Katarina Kraišnik (BIH)	3	3
Megawati Maheswari (INA)	5	14

Round of 32
Nahid Kiani (IRI)	12	15
In Su-wan (KOR)	0	14
Carla Godoy (ARG)	1	1
Luca Patakfalvy (HUN)	3	6
Nika Karabatić (CRO)	6	6	7
Chaima Toumi (TUN)	0	9	5
Megawati Maheswari (INA)	2	2
Fabiola Villegas (MEX)	6	5

Round of 16
Nahid Kiani (IRI)	5	11	8
Luca Patakfalvy (HUN)	9	3	6
Nika Karabatić (CRO)	10	14
Fabiola Villegas (MEX)	9	10

Quarterfinals
Nahid Kiani (IRI)	14	19
Nika Karabatić (CRO)	14	6
