= 2017 World Taekwondo Championships – Women's bantamweight =

Taekwondo competition

Women's bantamweight at the 2017 World Championships
- Venue: Taekwondowon
- Dates: 27–28 June 2017
- Competitors: 58 from 58 nations

Medalists
gold medal	Zeliha Ağrıs	Turkey
silver medal	Tatiana Kudashova	Russia
bronze medal	Dinorahon Mamadibragimova	Uzbekistan
bronze medal	Inese Tarvida	Latvia

The women's bantamweight is a competition featured at the 2017 World Taekwondo Championships, and was held at the Taekwondowon in Muju County, South Korea on June 27 and June 28. Bantamweights were limited to a maximum of 53 kilograms in body mass.

== Results ==
Legend

- DQ — Won by disqualification
- P — Won by punitive declaration
- W — Won by withdrawal

=== Finals ===
Semifinals		Final
Zeliha Ağrıs (TUR)	11
Dinorahon Mamadibragimova (UZB)	7	Zeliha Ağrıs (TUR)	11
Inese Tarvida (LAT)	5	Tatiana Kudashova (RUS)	8
Tatiana Kudashova (RUS)	11

=== Top half ===
==== Section 1 ====
Round of 64
Rhezie Aragon (PHI)	4
Edina Kotsis (HUN)	13
Chanatip Sonkham (THA)	DQ
~~Ouissem Kacemi (ALG)~~
~~Joanita Namugumya (UGA)~~
Mariska Halinda (INA)	DQ
Laura García (COL)	22
Imbrolia Amorin (TLS)	0
Phạm Thị Thu Hiền (VIE)	6
Tanja Rastović (CRO)	12
Yarden Sharabi (ISR)	7
Christianna Tyrologou (GRE)	8
~~Aline Ndacyayisenga (RWA)~~
Zeliha Ağrıs (TUR)	DQ

Round of 32
Radwa Reda (EGY)	6
Edina Kotsis (HUN)	5
Chanatip Sonkham (THA)	6
Mariska Halinda (INA)	14
Laura García (COL)	14
Tanja Rastović (CRO)	11
Christianna Tyrologou (GRE)	0
Zeliha Ağrıs (TUR)	20

Round of 16
Radwa Reda (EGY)	5
Mariska Halinda (INA)	5
Laura García (COL)	8
Zeliha Ağrıs (TUR)	14

Quarterfinals
Radwa Reda (EGY)	2
Zeliha Ağrıs (TUR)	2

==== Section 2 ====
Round of 64
Neema Gurung (NEP)	7
Dinorahon Mamadibragimova (UZB)	25^{P}
Liang Chia-yu (TPE)	DQ
~~Rosa Keleku (COD)~~
Shauna Bannon (IRL)	9
Aziza Chambers (USA)	12
Tijana Bogdanović (SRB)	DQ
~~Fatima Zahra Najem (MAR)~~
Gabriela Bohušová (SVK)	9
Taleen Hamaidi (JOR)	11
Jannet Alegría (MEX)	24
Kiyoko Nagano (JPN)	4

Round of 32
Rahma Ben Ali (TUN)	2
Dinorahon Mamadibragimova (UZB)	8
Liang Chia-yu (TPE)	6
Aziza Chambers (USA)	9
Tijana Bogdanović (SRB)	11
Taleen Hamaidi (JOR)	1
Jannet Alegría (MEX)	1
Madeline Folgmann (GER)	8

Round of 16
Dinorahon Mamadibragimova (UZB)	8
Aziza Chambers (USA)	7
Tijana Bogdanović (SRB)	18
Madeline Folgmann (GER)	12

Quarterfinals
Dinorahon Mamadibragimova (UZB)	5
Tijana Bogdanović (SRB)	5

=== Bottom half ===
==== Section 3 ====
Round of 64
Jasmin Nabilla Sukardi (MAS)	14
Leonor Lima (BRA)	20
Lydia García (ESP)	14
Andrea Hernández (BOL)	3
Nimra Wasiq (PAK)	9
Monica Pimentel (ARU)	17
Sarah Malykke (DEN)	22
Ericka Aly (GDL)	2
Katherin Purzel (PAR)	10
Zhazira Saparbek (KAZ)	26
Christina Schönegger (AUT)	12
Law Sin Yi (HKG)	6

Round of 32
Kim Min-jeong (KOR)	16
Leonor Lima (BRA)	12
Lydia García (ESP)	15
Monica Pimentel (ARU)	6
Sarah Malykke (DEN)	7
Zhazira Saparbek (KAZ)	5
Christina Schönegger (AUT)	1
Inese Tarvida (LAT)	11

Round of 16
Kim Min-jeong (KOR)	16
Lydia García (ESP)	4
Sarah Malykke (DEN)	2
Inese Tarvida (LAT)	6

Quarterfinals
Kim Min-jeong (KOR)	3
Inese Tarvida (LAT)	4

==== Section 4 ====
Round of 64
Andrea Jerom (CAN)	4
Wei Xiaojing (CHN)	9
~~Selbi Kiçigulowa (TKM)~~
Latika Bhandari (IND)	DQ
Yamicel Núñez (CUB)	7
Somaeh Gholami (AFG)	5
Nahome Jean (HAI)	2
Despina Pilavaki (CYP)	5
Awa Ouattara (CIV)	24
Eunice Adedapo (GHA)	5
~~Mary Maina (KEN)~~
Chinazum Nwosu (NGR)	DQ
Kyah English (AUS)	DQ
~~Paula Rouhi (SWE)~~

Round of 32
Wei Xiaojing (CHN)	15
Latika Bhandari (IND)	8
Yamicel Núñez (CUB)	1
Despina Pilavaki (CYP)	3
Awa Ouattara (CIV)	3
Chinazum Nwosu (NGR)	4
Kyah English (AUS)	0
Tatiana Kudashova (RUS)	14^{W}

Round of 16
Wei Xiaojing (CHN)	16
Despina Pilavaki (CYP)	4
Chinazum Nwosu (NGR)	1
Tatiana Kudashova (RUS)	19

Quarterfinals
Wei Xiaojing (CHN)	3
Tatiana Kudashova (RUS)	16
