= 2017 World Taekwondo Championships – Women's featherweight =

Taekwondo competition

Women's featherweight at the 2017 World Championships
- Venue: Taekwondowon
- Dates: 29–30 June 2017
- Competitors: 59 from 59 nations

Medalists
gold medal	Lee Ah-reum	South Korea
silver medal	Hatice Kübra İlgün	Turkey
bronze medal	Jade Jones	Great Britain
bronze medal	Nikita Glasnović	Sweden

The women's featherweight is a competition featured at the 2017 World Taekwondo Championships, and was held at the Taekwondowon in Muju County, South Korea on June 29 and 30. Featherweights were limited to a maximum of 57 kilograms in body mass.

== Results ==
Legend

- DQ — Won by disqualification
- P — Won by punitive declaration
- R — Won by referee stop contest

=== Finals ===
Semifinals		Final
Jade Jones (GBR)	8
Lee Ah-reum (KOR)	14	Lee Ah-reum (KOR)	7
Nikita Glasnović (SWE)	0	Hatice Kübra İlgün (TUR)	5
Hatice Kübra İlgün (TUR)	8

=== Top half ===
==== Section 1 ====
Round of 64
Nada Laaraj (MAR)	8
Lidia Fernández (ESP)	6
Aleksandra Radmilović (SRB)	20
Alicia Valdez (PAR)	6
Natalia D'Angelo (ITA)	2
Ara White (USA)	4
Carolena Carstens (PAN)	DQ
~~Zhanna Sattsaeva (NZL)~~
~~Ada Demneri (ALB)~~
Chen Yu-chuang (TPE)	DQ
Yaprak Eriş (AZE)	13
Dayana Seni (ECU)	2
Ginessa Archila (COL)	3
Skylar Park (CAN)	6

Round of 32
Jade Jones (GBR)	10
Nada Laaraj (MAR)	0
Aleksandra Radmilović (SRB)	4
Ara White (USA)	11
Carolena Carstens (PAN)	14
Chen Yu-chuang (TPE)	19
Yaprak Eriş (AZE)	14
Skylar Park (CAN)	26

Round of 16
Jade Jones (GBR)	20
Ara White (USA)	2
Chen Yu-chuang (TPE)	18
Skylar Park (CAN)	8

Quarterfinals
Jade Jones (GBR)	11
Chen Yu-chuang (TPE)	8

==== Section 2 ====
Round of 64
~~Sarah Dad (ALG)~~
Andriana Asprogeraka (GRE)	DQ
Pauline Lopez (PHI)	16
Beverly Matoméné (CGO)	6
Cassie Tubbs (CAM)	10
Rafaela Araújo (BRA)	11
Bruna Vuletić (CRO)	14
Anna-Maria Antoniou (CYP)	6
Aniat Oquendo (PUR)	0
Ekaterina Kim (RUS)	6
Louise Christensen (DEN)	18
Alina Shavinina (UKR)	3

Round of 32
Mayu Hamada (JPN)	8
Andriana Asprogeraka (GRE)	5
Pauline Lopez (PHI)	10
Rafaela Araújo (BRA)	9
Bruna Vuletić (CRO)	8
Ekaterina Kim (RUS)	8
Louise Christensen (DEN)	5
Lee Ah-reum (KOR)	27

Round of 16
Mayu Hamada (JPN)	5
Pauline Lopez (PHI)	4
Bruna Vuletić (CRO)	9
Lee Ah-reum (KOR)	15

Quarterfinals
Mayu Hamada (JPN)	8
Lee Ah-reum (KOR)	14

=== Bottom half ===
==== Section 3 ====
Round of 64
Gyani Chunara (NEP)	8
Aittana Moya (PER)	13
Suvi Mikkonen (FIN)	4
Carmen Marton (AUS)	16
Christina Tanios (LBN)	1
Phannapa Harnsujin (THA)	25
Patrycja Adamkiewicz (POL)	28
Lovely Agis-Lacazette (GDL)	2
Josefina Arzuaga (URU)	1
Marie Magnus (NOR)	13
Banassa Diomandé (CIV)	3
Tayyebeh Parsa (IRI)	12
Sabita Ramchiary (IND)	5
Raheleh Asemani (BEL)	33

Round of 32
Nikita Glasnović (SWE)	9
Aittana Moya (PER)	2
Carmen Marton (AUS)	11
Phannapa Harnsujin (THA)	14
Patrycja Adamkiewicz (POL)	9
Marie Magnus (NOR)	7
Tayyebeh Parsa (IRI)	16^{P}
Raheleh Asemani (BEL)	12

Round of 16
Nikita Glasnović (SWE)	5
Phannapa Harnsujin (THA)	4
Patrycja Adamkiewicz (POL)	11
Tayyebeh Parsa (IRI)	13

Quarterfinals
Nikita Glasnović (SWE)	7^{R}
Tayyebeh Parsa (IRI)	7

==== Section 4 ====
Round of 64
Anna-Lena Frömming (GER)	15
Francisca Ríos (CHI)	5
Laura Raimkul (KAZ)	10
Génesis Andújar (DOM)	12
Adriana Martínez (VEN)	6
Jolanta Tarvida (LAT)	8
Mary Muriu (KEN)	6
Hatice Kübra İlgün (TUR)	30
Joana Cunha (POR)	14
Shan Yunyun (CHN)	11
Yiu Pui In (HKG)	3
Bineta Diédhiou (SEN)	24
Klaudija Tvaronavičiūtė (LTU)	6
Fabiola Villegas (MEX)	10

Round of 32
Anna-Lena Frömming (GER)	8
Génesis Andújar (DOM)	7
Jolanta Tarvida (LAT)	4
Hatice Kübra İlgün (TUR)	5
Joana Cunha (POR)	14
Bineta Diédhiou (SEN)	11
Fabiola Villegas (MEX)	12
Hedaya Malak (EGY)	11

Round of 16
Anna-Lena Frömming (GER)	8
Hatice Kübra İlgün (TUR)	18
Joana Cunha (POR)	13
Fabiola Villegas (MEX)	5

Quarterfinals
Hatice Kübra İlgün (TUR)	2
Joana Cunha (POR)	2
