= 2017 World Taekwondo Championships – Women's flyweight =

Taekwondo competition

Women's flyweight at the 2017 World Championships
- Venue: Taekwondowon
- Dates: 25–26 June 2017
- Competitors: 48 from 48 nations

Medalists
gold medal	Vanja Stanković	Serbia
silver medal	Panipak Wongpattanakit	Thailand
bronze medal	Wenren Yuntao	China
bronze medal	Kristina Tomić	Croatia

The women's flyweight is a competition featured at the 2017 World Taekwondo Championships, and was held at the Taekwondowon in Muju County, South Korea on June 25 and June 26. Flyweight were limited to a maximum of 49 kilograms in body mass.

== Results ==
Legend

- DQ — Won by disqualification
- P — Won by punitive declaration

=== Finals ===
Semifinals		Final
Wenren Yuntao (CHN)	7
Panipak Wongpattanakit (THA)	10	Panipak Wongpattanakit (THA)	5
Vanja Stanković (SRB)	12	Vanja Stanković (SRB)	10
Kristina Tomić (CRO)	6

=== Top half ===
==== Section 1 ====
Round of 64
Nikol Chorbanova (BUL)	7
Courtney Eardley (GBR)	15
Charlotte Craig (USA)	5
Anna El-Haddad (LBN)	4
Samia Eid (SUD)	3
Miyu Yamada (JPN)	23
Wenren Yuntao (CHN)	5
Rheza Aragon (PHI)	1

Round of 32
Kim So-hui (KOR)	4
Courtney Eardley (GBR)	2
Charlotte Craig (USA)	6
Erica Nicoli (ITA)	1
Camila Rodríguez (COL)	9
Miyu Yamada (JPN)	10
Wenren Yuntao (CHN)	14
Svetlana Igumenova (RUS)	5

Round of 16
Kim So-hui (KOR)	18
Charlotte Craig (USA)	13
Miyu Yamada (JPN)	3
Wenren Yuntao (CHN)	23

Quarterfinals
Kim So-hui (KOR)	6
Wenren Yuntao (CHN)	8

==== Section 2 ====
Round of 64
Lam Siu Wai (HKG)	2
Dominika Hronová (CZE)	9
Blanca Palmer (ESP)	8
Lyubava Ilchyk (UKR)	1
Unvin Socharangsey (CAM)	2
Camille Dallaire-Leblanc (CAN)	19^{P}
Candelaria Marte (DOM)	11
Andrea Polycarpou (CYP)	3

Round of 32
Nour Abdelsalam (EGY)	4
Dominika Hronová (CZE)	9
Blanca Palmer (ESP)	3
İpek Çidem (TUR)	4
Talisca Reis (BRA)	20
Camille Dallaire-Leblanc (CAN)	3
Candelaria Marte (DOM)	9
Panipak Wongpattanakit (THA)	29

Round of 16
Dominika Hronová (CZE)	3
İpek Çidem (TUR)	15
Talisca Reis (BRA)	5
Panipak Wongpattanakit (THA)	26

Quarterfinals
İpek Çidem (TUR)	4
Panipak Wongpattanakit (THA)	12

=== Bottom half ===
==== Section 3 ====
Round of 64
Houda Ait Ouali (MAR)	6
Nahid Kiani (IRI)	12
Elizabeth Zamora (GUA)	18
Vasiliki Antoniou (GRE)	3
~~Dlyar Hossen (SYR)~~
Hung Yu-ting (TPE)	DQ
Vanja Stanković (SRB)	DQ
~~Laissa Umurerwa (RWA)~~

Round of 32
Yasmina Aziez (FRA)	13
Nahid Kiani (IRI)	14
Elizabeth Zamora (GUA)	3
Ana Petrušić (SLO)	2
Victoria Stambaugh (PUR)	9
Hung Yu-ting (TPE)	7
Vanja Stanković (SRB)	7
Patimat Abakarova (AZE)	4

Round of 16
Nahid Kiani (IRI)	20
Elizabeth Zamora (GUA)	3
Victoria Stambaugh (PUR)	6
Vanja Stanković (SRB)	13

Quarterfinals
Nahid Kiani (IRI)	2
Vanja Stanković (SRB)	15

==== Section 4 ====
Round of 64
Audrey Aka (CIV)	4
Jennifer Stingl (AUT)	9
Yania Aguirre (CUB)	15
Seema Kannaujiya (IND)	7
~~Parker Bolili (COD)~~
Keshena Waterford (AUS)	DQ
Ioanna Andreopoulou (GER)	23
Ayesha Noor (PAK)	4

Round of 32
Kristina Tomić (CRO)	18
Jennifer Stingl (AUT)	0
Yania Aguirre (CUB)	DQ
~~Julissa Diez Canseco (PER)~~
Ainur Yesbergenova (KAZ)	18
Keshena Waterford (AUS)	17
Ioanna Andreopoulou (GER)	6
Itzel Manjarrez (MEX)	7

Round of 16
Kristina Tomić (CRO)	15
Yania Aguirre (CUB)	5
Ainur Yesbergenova (KAZ)	11
Itzel Manjarrez (MEX)	14

Quarterfinals
Kristina Tomić (CRO)	11
Itzel Manjarrez (MEX)	4
