= 2024 European Taekwondo Championships – Women's 53 kg =

Women's 53 kg at the 2024 European Taekwondo Championships
- Venue: Belgrade Fair – Hall 1
- Location: Belgrade, Serbia
- Dates: 10 May
- Competitors: 19 from 19 nations

Medalists
gold medal	Tatiana Minina
silver medal	Zeynep Taşkın	Turkey
bronze medal	Andrea Bokan	Serbia
bronze medal	Ada Avdagić	Bosnia and Herzegovina

The women's 53 kg competition at the 2024 European Taekwondo Championships was held on 10 May 2024.

== Results ==
=== Finals ===
Semifinals
Tatiana Minina (AIN)	2
Andrea Bokan (SRB)	0
Zeynep Taşkın (TUR)	2
Ada Avdagić (BIH)	1

Final
Tatiana Minina (AIN)	2
Zeynep Taşkın (TUR)	0

=== Top half ===
==== Section 1 ====
Round of 32
Sofiia Khobtar (UKR)	2
Nagia Kaourtishi (CYP)	1

Round of 16
Alma Pérez (ESP)	2
Sofiia Khobtar (UKR)	0
Louise Lyngbæk (DEN)	0
Tatiana Minina (AIN)	2

Quarterfinals
Alma Pérez (ESP)	0
Tatiana Minina (AIN)	2

==== Section 2 ====
Round of 16
Luca Patakfalvy (HUN)	2
Sarah Al Halwani (ITA)	0
Teigan Smith (GBR)	0
Andrea Bokan (SRB)	2

Quarterfinals
Luca Patakfalvy (HUN)	1
Andrea Bokan (SRB)	2

=== Bottom half ===
==== Section 3 ====
Round of 32
Filipa Bastos (POR)	1
Ellinor Malmgren (SWE)	2

Round of 16
Madeline Folgmann (GER)	2
Ellinor Malmgren (SWE)	0
Zeynep Taşkın (TUR)	2
Biana Lager (ISR)	0

Quarterfinals
Madeline Folgmann (GER)	1
Zeynep Taşkın (TUR)	2

==== Section 4 ====
Round of 32
Kalliopi Koutroumpi (GRE)
Nigar Abdullayeva (AZE)

Round of 16
Ada Avdagić (BIH)	2
Mia Tukić (CRO)	0
Nigar Abdullayeva (AZE)	0
Dominika Hronová (CZE)	2

Quarterfinals
Ada Avdagić (BIH)	2
Dominika Hronová (CZE)	0
