= Vanja Stanković =

Serbian taekwondo practitioner

Personal information
- Born: 24 March 1998 (age 28) Belgrade, Serbia, FR Yugoslavia

Sport
- Country: Serbia
- Sport: Taekwondo
- Event: Flyweight
- Club: Taekwondo Club Galeb
Medal record
World Championships
Gold medal – first place	2017 Muju	Flyweight
Mediterranean Games
Bronze medal – third place	2018 Tarragona	49 kg
Grand Slam
Silver medal – second place	2017 Wuxi	49 kg
European under-21 Championships
Gold medal – first place	2017 Sofia	49 kg

Vanja Stanković (Serbian Cyrillic: Вања Станковић; born 24 March 1998) is a Serbian taekwondo practitioner. She won a gold medal in the women's flyweight event at the 2017 World Taekwondo Championships.

== Beginnings ==
Born in Belgrade and a member of TK Galeb, Stanković was trained by Dragan Jović and Uroš Todorović. She studied at the Sports Gymnasium in Belgrade, from where she graduated in 2017.

== Career ==
In the months preceding her win at the World Championships, Stanković won gold medals at the European under-21 Taekwondo Championships in Bulgaria and the Belgian Open.

In June 2017, Stanković participated in the women's flyweight class (up to 49 kg) at the 2017 World Taekwondo Championships. She defeated Olympic bronze medallist Patimat Abakarova of Azerbaijan in her first match, going on to defeat another Olympic bronze medallist, Panipak Wongpattanakit of Thailand, in the final to become World Champion. Her gold medal was Serbia's first-ever gold medal at the World Championships.

Stanković won a bronze medal at the 2018 Mediterranean Games, where she reached the semi-finals of the women's 49 kg event before losing to Kristina Tomić of Croatia. In 2019, she won the US Open G2 category event in Las Vegas in the women's 49 kg event, winning all five of her bouts including the final against German Ela Aydin. She also competed in the women's 49 kg event at the 2022 Mediterranean Games held in Oran, Algeria. She won her first match and was then eliminated by eventual gold medalist Merve Dinçel of Turkey.

In August 2023, Stanković won a gold medal in the European Championships Olympic Weight Categories in Tallinn, Estonia, in the women's 49 kg category.
