= Taekwondo at the 2018 Asian Games – Women's 53 kg =

Taekwondo competition

Women's 53 kg at the 2018 Asian Games
- Venue: Jakarta Convention Center
- Date: 20 August 2018
- Competitors: 18 from 18 nations

Medalists
gold medal	Su Po-ya	Chinese Taipei
silver medal	Ha Min-ah	South Korea
bronze medal	Laetitia Aoun	Lebanon
bronze medal	Fariza Aldangorova	Kazakhstan

The women's bantamweight (53 kilograms) event at the 2018 Asian Games took place on 20 August 2018 at Jakarta Convention Center Plenary Hall, Jakarta, Indonesia.

== Schedule ==
All times are Western Indonesia Time (UTC+07:00)

Date	Time	Event
Monday, 20 August 2018	09:00	Round of 32
Monday, 20 August 2018	09:00	Round of 16
Monday, 20 August 2018	09:00	Quarterfinals
Monday, 20 August 2018	16:00	Semifinals
Monday, 20 August 2018	16:00	Final

== Results ==
=== Final ===
Final
Ha Min-ah (KOR)	10
Su Po-ya (TPE)	29

=== Top half ===
Round of 32
Phannapa Harnsujin (THA)	39
Dhaysi Oo Julius (MYA)	0

Round of 16
Ha Min-ah (KOR)	28
Phannapa Harnsujin (THA)	12
Hồ Thị Kim Ngân (VIE)	5
Liu Kaiqi (CHN)	19
Laetitia Aoun (LBN)	23
Neema Gurung (NEP)	10
Maria Madeira Barros (TLS)	3
Mariska Halinda (INA)	28

Quarterfinals
Ha Min-ah (KOR)	10
Liu Kaiqi (CHN)	4
Laetitia Aoun (LBN)	23
Mariska Halinda (INA)	22

Semifinals
Ha Min-ah (KOR)	12
Laetitia Aoun (LBN)	1

=== Bottom half ===
Round of 32
Law Sin Yi (HKG)	12
Aneila Aysha Afsar (PAK)	6

Round of 16
Dinorahon Mamadibragimova (UZB)	16
Fariza Aldangorova (KAZ)	17
Rhezie Aragon (PHI)	2
Elaheh Sheidaei (IRI)	10
Kiyoko Nagano (JPN)	6
Su Po-ya (TPE)	26
Law Sin Yi (HKG)	24
Latika Bhandari (IND)	22

Quarterfinals
Fariza Aldangorova (KAZ)	11
Elaheh Sheidaei (IRI)	3
Su Po-ya (TPE)	38
Law Sin Yi (HKG)	4

Semifinals
Fariza Aldangorova (KAZ)	6
Su Po-ya (TPE)	11
