= Taekwondo at the 2018 Mediterranean Games – Women's 49 kg =

Taekwondo competition

Taekwondo – Women's 49 kg at the 2018 Mediterranean Games
- Venue: Salou Pavilion
- Date: 28 June
- Competitors: 12 from 12 nations

Medalists
gold medal	Rukiye Yıldırım	Turkey
silver medal	Kristina Tomić	Croatia
bronze medal	Oumaima El Bouchti	Morocco
bronze medal	Vanja Stanković	Serbia

The women's 49 kg competition of the taekwondo events at the 2018 Mediterranean Games took place on the 28 of June at the Salou Pavilion.

== Schedule ==
All times are Central European Summer Time (UTC+2).

Date	Time	Round
June 28, 2018	10:00	Preliminaries
June 28, 2018	16:00	Finals

== Results ==
Legend

- PTG — Won by Points Gap
- SUP — Won by superiority
- OT — Won on over time (Golden Point)
- DQ — Won by disqualification
- PUN — Won by punitive declaration
- WD — Won by withdrawal

=== Main bracket ===
Preliminary round
9	Ikram Dhahri (TUN)	10 (OT)
8	Martina Corelli (ITA)	8
5	Yasmina Aziez (FRA)	8
Oumaima El Bouchti (MAR)	14
11	Anna El Haddad (LBN)	6
6	Nour Abdelsalam (EGY)	11
7	Blanca Palmer Soler (ESP)	25
10	Varvara Apoikou (GRE)	7

Quarter-finals
1	Rukiye Yıldırım (TUR)	24
9	Ikram Dhahri (TUN)	9
Oumaima El Bouchti (MAR)	22
4	Kyriaki Kouttouki (CYP)	13
3	Vanja Stanković (SRB)	13
6	Nour Abdelsalam (EGY)	0
7	Blanca Palmer Soler (ESP)	5
2	Kristina Tomić (CRO)	12

Semi-finals
1	Rukiye Yıldırım (TUR)	33
Oumaima El Bouchti (MAR)	15
3	Vanja Stanković (SRB)	8
2	Kristina Tomić (CRO)	20

Gold medal match
1	Rukiye Yıldırım (TUR)	12 (OT)
2	Kristina Tomić (CRO)	11
