= 2017 World Taekwondo Grand Slam =

Taekwondo international competition

- Venue: Wuxi Taihu International Expo Center
- Location: Wuxi, China
- Dates: 30 December–20 January 2018
- Competitors: 96
- Total prize money: US$760,000

The 2017 World Taekwondo Grand Slam is the 1st edition of the World Taekwondo Grand Slam series.

== Qualifications and seeding position ==
Seed	Result
No. 1 Seed	(Brazil) 2016 Olympic Champion
No. 2 Seed	(South Korea) 2017 World Champion (heavier weight category)
No. 3 Seed	(South Korea) 2017 World Champion (lighter weight category)
No. 4 Seed	(Ivory Coast) 2017 Grand Prix Final Champion
No. 5 Seed	(Russia) 2017 Grand Prix Series 1 Champion
No. 6 Seed	(Morocco) 2017 Grand Prix Series 2 Champion
No. 7 Seed	(United Kingdom) 2017 Grand Prix Series 3 Champion
No. 8 Seed	(Azerbaijan) 2016 Grand Prix Final Champion
No. 9 Seed	(China) 1st place athlete of Open Qualification Tournament
No. 10 Seed	(China) 2nd place athlete of Open Qualification Tournament
No. 11 Seed	(China) 3rd place athlete of Open Qualification Tournament
No. 12 Seed	(China) Host Country Place Athlete

- In case of multi qualified athlete(s) as well as withdrawal of invitation among No.1 to No. 8 seeded athletes, the higher seeding position shall be assigned to athlete as mandatory.
- No.9 to No. 12 seeding are fixed position, and replacement for No.9 to No. 11 will be decided by the rules of Qualification Tournament for Wuxi 2017 WT Grand Slam Champions Series
- In case of multi qualified athlete(s) as well as withdrawal of invitation among No.1 to No.8 seeded athletes, following replacement rule shall apply:

1st Replacement	By The Next Highest Ranked Athlete in Olympic Ranking of November 2017
2nd Replacement	By The Next Highest Ranked Athlete in Olympic Ranking of November 2017
3rd Replacement	By Recommendation of WT Technical Committee
4th Replacement	By Recommendation of WT Technical Committee
5th Replacement or beyond	By The Next Highest Ranked Athlete in Olympic Ranking of November 2017

== Events schedule ==
The competition was held every saturday since 30 December 2017 to 20 January 2018.

Event Date	Weight Division	
Event Date	Men	Women
30 December 2017	-80 kg	+67kg
6 January 2018	-68 kg	-67kg
13 January 2018	+80 kg	-49kg
20 January 2018	-58 kg	-57kg

== Medal summary ==
The team championships were also held in the same arena but for a different competition, called the World Cup Team Championships.

=== Men ===
Event	Gold	Silver	Bronze
58 kg	Kim Tae-hun; South Korea	Jang Jun; South Korea	Mikhail Artamonov; Russia
68 kg	Lee Dae-hoon; South Korea	Zhao Shuai; China	Alexey Denisenko; Russia
80 kg	Maksim Khramtsov; Russia	Namgoong Hwan; South Korea	Milad Beigi; Azerbaijan
+80 kg	In Kyo-don; South Korea	Roman Kuznetsov; Russia	Sajjad Mardani; Iran

=== Women ===
Event	Gold	Silver	Bronze
49 kg	Kim So-hui; South Korea	Vanja Stanković; Serbia	Wenren Yuntao; China
57 kg	Irem Yaman; Turkey	Zhou Lijun; China	Luo Zongshi; China
67 kg	Ruth Gbagbi; Ivory Coast	Guo Yunfei; China	Oh Hye-ri; South Korea
+67 kg	Bianca Walkden; Great Britain	Jackie Galloway; United States	Nafia Kus; Turkey

== Medal table ==
Rank	Nation	Gold	Silver	Bronze	Total
1	South Korea (KOR)	4	2	1	7
2	Russia (RUS)	1	1	2	4
3	Turkey (TUR)	1	0	1	2
4	Great Britain (GBR)	1	0	0	1
4	Ivory Coast (CIV)	1	0	0	1
6	China (CHN)	0	3	2	5
7	Serbia (SRB)	0	1	0	1
7	United States (USA)	0	1	0	1
9	Azerbaijan (AZE)	0	0	1	1
9	Iran (IRI)	0	0	1	1
Totals (10 entries)		8	8	8	24
