= Taekwondo at the 2022 Asian Games – Women's 53 kg =

Taekwondo competition

Women's 53 kg at the 2022 Asian Games
- Venue: Lin'an Sports and Culture Centre
- Date: 26 September 2023
- Competitors: 18 from 18 nations

Medalists
gold medal	Park Hye-jin	South Korea
silver medal	Lin Wei-chun	Chinese Taipei
bronze medal	Chutikan Jongkolrattanawattana	Thailand
bronze medal	Charos Kayumova	Uzbekistan

The women's 53 kilograms event at the 2022 Asian Games took place on 26 September 2023 at Lin'an Sports and Culture Centre, Hangzhou, China.

== Schedule ==
All times are China Standard Time (UTC+08:00)

Date	Time	Event
Tuesday, 26 September 2023	09:00	Round of 32
Tuesday, 26 September 2023	09:00	Round of 16
Tuesday, 26 September 2023	14:00	Quarterfinals
Tuesday, 26 September 2023	14:00	Semifinals
Tuesday, 26 September 2023	14:00	Gold medal contest

== Results ==
Legend

- W — Won by withdrawal

=== Final ===
Gold medal contest
Park Hye-jin (KOR)	7	7	12
Lin Wei-chun (TPE)	6	9	9

=== Top half ===
Round of 32
Moe Myint Myat (MYA)	0	3
Chutikan Jongkolrattanawattana (THA)	12	13

Round of 16
Nahid Kiani (IRI)	2	8	6
Chutikan Jongkolrattanawattana (THA)	9	4	6
Julie Mam (CAM)	4	0
Megawati Maheswari (INA)	10	4^{W}
Aziza Karajanova (KAZ)	6	11
Vũ Thị Dung (VIE)	2	6
Ayasha Lama (NEP)	5	0
Park Hye-jin (KOR)	17	13

Quarterfinals
Chutikan Jongkolrattanawattana (THA)	7	9
Megawati Maheswari (INA)	4	6
Aziza Karajanova (KAZ)	3	3
Park Hye-jin (KOR)	4	5

Semifinals
Chutikan Jongkolrattanawattana (THA)	0	1
Park Hye-jin (KOR)	0	1

=== Bottom half ===
Round of 32
Nichelle Tan (SGP)	15	14
Teresa Lein (TLS)	3	2

Round of 16
Charos Kayumova (UZB)	12	11
So Yuen Ting (HKG)	0	5
Yuzuho Kato (JPN)	3	2	0
Jessica Canabal (PHI)	3	4	12
Mariella Bou Habib (LBN)	1	3
Lin Wei-chun (TPE)	15	13
Nichelle Tan (SGP)	0	0
Zuo Ju (CHN)	11	13

Quarterfinals
Charos Kayumova (UZB)	9	14	8
Jessica Canabal (PHI)	11	2	2
Lin Wei-chun (TPE)	14	18
Zuo Ju (CHN)	12	9

Semifinals
Charos Kayumova (UZB)	4	3
Lin Wei-chun (TPE)	7	22
