= 2021 European Taekwondo Championships =

- Venue: Grand Hotel Millennium Sofia
- Location: Sofia, Bulgaria
- Dates: 8–11 April
- Competitors: 363 (161 women and 262 men) from 45 nations

Champion
- Russia
- Men: Russia
- Women: Great Britain

The 2021 European Taekwondo Championships, the 24th edition of the European Taekwondo Championships, was held in Sofia, Bulgaria at the Grand Hotel Millennium Sofia from 8 to 11 April 2021.

== Medal table ==
* Host nation (Bulgaria)

Rank	Nation	Gold	Silver	Bronze	Total
1	Russia (RUS)	4	2	4	10
2	Great Britain (GBR)	3	2	0	5
3	Croatia (CRO)	3	0	2	5
4	Spain (ESP)	1	2	5	8
5	Turkey (TUR)	1	2	2	5
6	Poland (POL)	1	1	0	2
7	Belarus (BLR)	1	0	1	2
7	France (FRA)	1	0	1	2
7	Hungary (HUN)	1	0	1	2
10	Bosnia and Herzegovina (BIH)	0	2	0	2
10	Serbia (SRB)	0	2	0	2
12	Azerbaijan (AZE)	0	1	1	2
12	Greece (GRE)	0	1	1	2
14	Romania (ROU)	0	1	0	1
15	Belgium (BEL)	0	0	3	3
15	Italy (ITA)	0	0	3	3
17	Austria (AUT)	0	0	1	1
17	Bulgaria (BUL)*	0	0	1	1
17	Germany (GER)	0	0	1	1
17	Israel (ISR)	0	0	1	1
17	Latvia (LAT)	0	0	1	1
17	Portugal (POR)	0	0	1	1
17	Sweden (SWE)	0	0	1	1
17	Ukraine (UKR)	0	0	1	1
Totals (24 entries)		16	16	32	64

== Medal summary ==
=== Men ===
Event	Gold	Silver	Bronze
−54 kg	Omar Salim; Hungary	Dionisios Rapsomanikis; Greece	Yahor Kazlou; Belarus
−54 kg	Omar Salim; Hungary	Dionisios Rapsomanikis; Greece	Viacheslav Bovkun; Russia
−58 kg	Cyrian Ravet; France	Adrián Vicente; Spain	Rui Bragança; Portugal
−58 kg	Cyrian Ravet; France	Adrián Vicente; Spain	Frederik Emil Olsen; Sweden
−63 kg	Hakan Reçber; Turkey	Joan Jorquera; Spain	Jaouad Achab; Belgium
−63 kg	Hakan Reçber; Turkey	Joan Jorquera; Spain	Simone Crescenzi; Italy
−68 kg	Sarmat Tcakoev; Russia	Bradly Sinden; Great Britain	Javier Pérez; Spain
−68 kg	Sarmat Tcakoev; Russia	Bradly Sinden; Great Britain	Konstantinos Chamalidis; Greece
−74 kg	Karol Robak; Poland	Nedžad Husić; Bosnia and Herzegovina	Daniel Quesada; Spain
−74 kg	Karol Robak; Poland	Nedžad Husić; Bosnia and Herzegovina	Badr Achab; Belgium
−80 kg	Maksim Khramtsov; Russia	Milad Beigi; Azerbaijan	Simone Alessio; Italy
−80 kg	Maksim Khramtsov; Russia	Milad Beigi; Azerbaijan	Raúl Martínez; Spain
−87 kg	Yury Kirichenko; Russia	Mehdi Khodabakhshi; Serbia	Roberto Botta; Italy
−87 kg	Yury Kirichenko; Russia	Mehdi Khodabakhshi; Serbia	Ivan Šapina; Croatia
+87 kg	Arman-Marshall Silla; Belarus	Vladislav Larin; Russia	Iván García; Spain
+87 kg	Arman-Marshall Silla; Belarus	Vladislav Larin; Russia	Andrii Harbar; Ukraine

=== Women ===
Event	Gold	Silver	Bronze
−46 kg	Lena Stojković; Croatia	Larisa Medvedeva; Russia	Rivka Bayech; Israel
−46 kg	Lena Stojković; Croatia	Larisa Medvedeva; Russia	Minaya Akbarova; Azerbaijan
−49 kg	Adriana Cerezo; Spain	Liana Musteață; Romania	Elizaveta Ryadninskaya; Russia
−49 kg	Adriana Cerezo; Spain	Liana Musteață; Romania	Ela Aydin; Germany
−53 kg	Tatiana Kudashova; Russia	Zeliha Ağrıs; Turkey	Luca Patakfalvy; Hungary
−53 kg	Tatiana Kudashova; Russia	Zeliha Ağrıs; Turkey	Ilina Ivanova; Bulgaria
−57 kg	Jade Jones; Great Britain	Hatice Kübra İlgün; Turkey	Inese Tarvida; Latvia
−57 kg	Jade Jones; Great Britain	Hatice Kübra İlgün; Turkey	Raheleh Asemani; Belgium
−62 kg	Bruna Vuletić; Croatia	Marija Štetić; Bosnia and Herzegovina	İrem Yaman; Turkey
−62 kg	Bruna Vuletić; Croatia	Marija Štetić; Bosnia and Herzegovina	Kristina Prokudina; Russia
−67 kg	Matea Jelić; Croatia	Lauren Williams; Great Britain	Nur Tatar; Turkey
−67 kg	Matea Jelić; Croatia	Lauren Williams; Great Britain	Magda Wiet-Hénin; France
−73 kg	Rebecca McGowan; Great Britain	Milica Mandić; Serbia	Polina Khan; Russia
−73 kg	Rebecca McGowan; Great Britain	Milica Mandić; Serbia	Doris Pole; Croatia
+73 kg	Bianca Walkden; Great Britain	Aleksandra Kowalczuk; Poland	Marlene Jahl; Austria
+73 kg	Bianca Walkden; Great Britain	Aleksandra Kowalczuk; Poland	Belén Morán; Spain

== Team ranking ==
=== Men ===
Rank	Team	Points
1	Russia	
2	{{}}	
3	{{}}	
4	{{}}	
5	{{}}	
6	{{}}	
7	{{}}	
8	{{}}	
9	{{}}	
10	{{}}	

=== Women ===
Rank	Team	Points
1	Great Britain	
2	{{}}	
3	{{}}	
4	{{}}	
5	{{}}	
6	{{}}	
7	{{}}	
8	{{}}	
9	{{}}	
10	{{}}	

== Participating nations ==
- Great Britain (15)
- Spain (16)
- Portugal (4)

== See also ==
- 2021 European Para Taekwondo Championships
