= Zhou Lijun =

Chinese taekwondo practitioner

Her Excellency Zhou Lijun
Personal information
- Nationality: Chinese
- Born: 1 January 1999 (age 27) Yifeng County, Yichun, Jiangxi, China
- Height: 175 cm (5 ft 9 in)
- Weight: 57 kg (126 lb)

Sport
- Sport: Taekwondo
Medal record
Women's taekwondo
Representing China
World Championships
| Bronze medal – third place | 2019 Manchester | 57 kg |
Grand Slam
| Gold medal – first place | 2018 Wuxi | 57 kg |
| Gold medal – first place | 2019 Wuxi | 57 kg |
| Bronze medal – third place | 2017 Wuxi | 57 kg |
Grand Prix
| Gold medal – first place | 2019 Sofia | 57 kg |
| Silver medal – second place | 2018 Manchester | 57 kg |
| Bronze medal – third place | 2022 Paris | 57 kg |
Asian Championships
| Gold medal – first place | 2018 Ho Chi Minh City | 57 kg |
Grand Slam (Qualification)
| Bronze medal – third place | 2017 Wuxi | 57 kg |
World Junior Championships
| Gold medal – first place | 2016 Burnaby | 57 kg |
- Updated on 12 December 2022

Zhou Lijun (born 1 January 1999) is a Chinese taekwondo athlete. She won the gold medal at the 2018 Asian Taekwondo Championships on the women's featherweight's. Later, she won the 2018 World Taekwondo Grand Slam defeating the olympic champion Jade Jones on the grand final of the women's featherweight's.
