= Charos Kayumova =

Uzbekistani taekwondo practitioner

Personal information
- Born: 1 July 1999 (age 27)

Sport
- Country: Uzbekistan
- Sport: Taekwondo
- Weight class: 53 kg
Medal record
Women's taekwondo
Representing Uzbekistan
Asian Games
Bronze medal – third place	2022 Hangzhou	53 kg
Asian Championships
Gold medal – first place	2021 Beirut	53 kg
Silver medal – second place	2022 Chuncheon	53 kg
Military World Games
Gold medal – first place	2019 Wuhan	53 kg
Islamic Solidarity Games
Bronze medal – third place	2021 Konya	53 kg

Charos Kayumova (born 1 July 1999) is an Uzbekistani taekwondo practitioner. She won the gold medal in the women's 53 kg event at the 2021 Asian Taekwondo Championships held in Beirut, Lebanon.

Kayumova competed in the women's 57 kg event at the 2018 Asian Games in Jakarta, Indonesia. She won her first match and she was then eliminated in her next match by Vipawan Siripornpermsak of Thailand.

In 2019, Kayumova competed in the women's bantamweight event at the World Taekwondo Championships held in Manchester, United Kingdom. In that same year, she represented Uzbekistan at the 2019 Military World Games in Wuhan, China and she won the gold medal in the 53 kg event.
