= Taekwondo at the 2023 European Games – Women's 53 kg =

Taekwondo competition

Women's 53 kg at the 2023 European Games
- Venue: Krynica-Zdrój Arena
- Date: 24 June
- Competitors: 16 from 16 nations

Medalists
gold medal	Ivana Duvančić	Croatia
silver medal	Alma Pérez	Spain
bronze medal	Luca Patakfalvy	Hungary
bronze medal	Dominika Hronová	Czech Republic

The women's 53 kg competition in taekwondo at the 2023 European Games took place on 24 June at the Krynica-Zdrój Arena.

== Schedule ==
All times are Central European Summer Time (UTC+2).

Date	Time	Event
Saturday, 24 June 2023	09:00	Round of 16
Saturday, 24 June 2023	14:00	Quarterfinals
Saturday, 24 June 2023	15:36	Semifinals
Saturday, 24 June 2023	16:24	Repechage
Saturday, 24 June 2023	19:00	Bronze medal bouts
Saturday, 24 June 2023	20:00	Final

== Results ==
Round of 16
Ivana Duvančić (CRO)	7	17
Gabriela Coman (ROU)	1	4
Gerda Meištininkaitė (LTU)	0	9	7
Biana Lager (ISR)	7	3	9
Ela Aydin (GER)	4	9	8
Sarah Al Halwani (ITA)	10	3	6
Sıla Ezgi Yağcı (TUR)	2	6	9
Łucja Oleszczuk (POL)	7	1	5
Tijana Bogdanović (SRB)	4	14	3
Jodie McKew (GBR)	9	10	8
Louise Lyngbæk (DEN)	3	0
Luca Patakfalvy (HUN)	10	14
Dominika Hronová (CZE)	7	14
Gabriela Briškárová (SVK)	5	2
Despina Pilavaki (CYP)	1	2
Alma Pérez (ESP)	13	9

Quarterfinals
Ivana Duvančić (CRO)	12	16
Biana Lager (ISR)	0	15
Ela Aydin (GER)	3	6	5
Sıla Ezgi Yağcı (TUR)	7	0	0
Jodie McKew (GBR)	0	5	6
Luca Patakfalvy (HUN)	7	1	11
Dominika Hronová (CZE)	1	4
Alma Pérez (ESP)	7	12

Semifinals
Ivana Duvančić (CRO)	3	2	8
Ela Aydin (GER)	2	8	3
Luca Patakfalvy (HUN)	4	3
Alma Pérez (ESP)	12	5

Final
Ivana Duvančić (CRO)	1	3
Alma Pérez (ESP)	0	0

=== Repechage ===
Repechage			Bronze medal bout
			Luca Patakfalvy (HUN)	7	25
Biana Lager (ISR)	12	12	Biana Lager (ISR)	4	4
Gabriela Coman (ROU)	0	4
Despina Pilavaki (CYP)	0	5
Dominika Hronová (CZE)	13	8	Dominika Hronová (CZE)	10	7	7
			Ela Aydin (GER)	7	7	5
