= 2019 World Taekwondo Grand Slam =

Taekwondo international competition

- Venue: Wuxi Taihu International Expo Center
- Location: Wuxi, China
- Dates: 18–20 December
- Competitors: 128
- Total prize money: US$760,000

The 2019 World Taekwondo Grand Slam is the 3rd edition of the World Taekwondo Grand Slam series taking place from 18 to 20 December in Wuxi, China.

== Qualifications and seeding position ==
Seed	Result
No. 1 Seed	(China) 2018 Grand Slam winner
No. 2 Seed	(United Kingdom) 2019 World Championship winner (Heavier)
No. 3 Seed	(United Kingdom) 2019 World Championship winner (Lighter)
No. 4 Seed	(China) 2018 Grand Slam runner-up
No. 5 Seed	(United Kingdom) 2019 Grand Prix Final winner
No. 6 Seed	(Bulgaria) 2019 Grand Prix Series 3 winner
No. 7 Seed	(Japan) 2019 Grand Prix Series 2 winner
No. 8 Seed	(Italy) 2019 Grand Prix Series 1 winner
No. 9 Seed	(China) 1st place athlete of Open Qualification Tournament II
No. 10 Seed	(China) 1st place athlete of Open Qualification Tournament I

- In case of one athlete occupying multiple seeding positions, the highest seeding position shall be assigned to the athlete, and vacant seeding positions shall be filled by other seeding athletes only
- The highest Olympic ranking athletes of November, 2019 shall fill up the unoccupied position, but not for seeding.

Non Seeded Athletes are as follows:

- 2nd place of 2019 Qualification Tournament II
- 2nd place of 2019 Qualification Tournament I
- 3rd place of 2019 Qualification Tournament II
- 3rd place of 2019 Qualification Tournament I
- Recommended athlete by WT Technical Committee
- Recommended athlete by Host Country.

== Events schedule ==
The competition was held from 18 December to 20 December.

Event Date	Weight Division	
Event Date	Men	Women
18 December	-68 kg	-67 kg
18 December	-80 kg	-67 kg
19 December	+80 kg	-49 kg
19 December	+80 kg	-57 kg
20 December	-58 kg	+67 kg

== Medal summary ==
=== Men ===
Event	Gold	Silver	Bronze
58 kg	Bae Jun-seo (KOR)	Lee Min-yeong (KOR)	Liang Yushuai (CHN)
68 kg	Lee Dae-hoon (KOR)	Zhao Shuai (CHN)	Lin Wenye (CHN)
80 kg	Maksim Khramtsov (RUS)	Hwan Nam-goong (KOR)	Nikita Rafalovich (UZB)
+80 kg	In Kyo-don (KOR)	Mahama Cho (GBR)	Rafail Aiukaev (RUS)

=== Women ===
Event	Gold	Silver	Bronze
49 kg	Panipak Wongpattanakit (THA)	Wu Jingyu (CHN)	Zuo Ju (CHN)
57 kg	Zhou Lijun (CHN)	Jade Jones (GBR)	Luo Zongshi (CHN)
67 kg	Matea Jelić (CRO)	Doris Pole (CRO)	Guo Yunfei (CHN)
+67 kg	Lee Da-bin (KOR)	Bianca Walkden (GBR)	Zheng Shuyin (CHN)

== Medal table ==
Rank	Nation	Gold	Silver	Bronze	Total
1	South Korea (KOR)	4	2	0	6
2	China (CHN)	1	2	6	9
3	Croatia (CRO)	1	1	0	2
4	Russia (RUS)	1	0	1	2
5	Thailand (THA)	1	0	0	1
6	Great Britain (GBR)	0	3	0	3
7	Uzbekistan (UZB)	0	0	1	1
Totals (7 entries)		8	8	8	24
