= 2017 World Taekwondo Grand Slam - Open Qualification Tournament =

Aekwondo competition

2017 World Taekwondo Grand Slam - Open Qualification Tournament is an international G-1 taekwondo tournament which allows the first three athletes to compete on the 2017 World Taekwondo Grand Slam as 9th, 10th and 11th seeds on their respective weight category brackets. The tournament was held from 23-24 November in Wuxi, China.

== Medal summary ==
=== Men ===
Event	Gold	Silver	Bronze
58 kg	Jang Jun; South Korea	Ebrahim Safari; Iran	Chen Xiaoyi; China
68 kg	Boris Krasnov; Russia	Abolfazl Yaghoubi; Iran	Mirhashem Hosseini; Iran
80 kg	Namgoong Hwan; South Korea	Richard Ordemann; Norway	Yang Tsung-yeh; Chinese Taipei
+80 kg	Lee Seung-hwan; South Korea	Sun Hongyi; China	Vedran Golec; Croatia

=== Women ===
Event	Gold	Silver	Bronze
49 kg	Ha Min-ah; South Korea	Kristina Tomić; Croatia	Nahid Kiani; Iran
57 kg	Irem Yaman; Turkey	Lim Geum-byeol; South Korea	Zhou Lijun; China
67 kg	Guo Yunfei; China	Kim Jan-di; South Korea	Zhang Mengyu; China
+67 kg	Aleksandra Kowalczuk; Poland	Zahra Pouresmaeil; Iran	Li Chen; China

== Medal table ==
Rank	Nation	Gold	Silver	Bronze	Total
1	South Korea (KOR)	4	2	0	6
2	China (CHN)	1	1	4	6
3	Poland (POL)	1	0	0	1
3	Russia (RUS)	1	0	0	1
3	Turkey (TUR)	1	0	0	1
6	Iran (IRI)	0	3	2	5
7	Croatia (CRO)	0	1	1	2
8	Norway (NOR)	0	1	0	1
9	Chinese Taipei (TPE)	0	0	1	1
Totals (9 entries)		8	8	8	24
