= Andriana Asprogeraka =

Greek taekwondo practitioner

Personal information
- Nationality: Greek, French
- Born: 17/8/1997 Paris, France

Sport
- Sport: Taekwondo
Medal record
Representing Greece
Women's taekwondo
World Championships
Bronze medal – third place	2015 Chelyabinsk	Bantamweight

Andriana Asprogeraka (born 17 August 1997) is a Greek taekwondo practitioner.

She won a bronze medal in bantamweight at the 2015 World Taekwondo Championships, after being defeated by Lim Geum-byeol in the semifinal. She also competed at the 2017 and 2019 World Taekwondo Championships. Only at the age of 17 the Greek athlete managed to bring a medal for Greece at the world level after 18 years, where in 2002 Adriana's coach, Areti Athanasopoulou had come out first in the world championship in Texas.

Adriana has also participated at the qualification for the Rio 2016 Olympics, losing the medal by one point to German champion Anna-Lena Frömming.

In 2020, for the second time in a row, he belonged to the pre-Olympic team for the qualification of the Tokyo 2021 Olympic Games.

Apart from her world medal, Adriana Asprogeraka had won first place in the 21-year-old championship in Innsbruck, Austria and second place in the Junior Championship in Porto, Portugal.

He also participated in the 2017 World Taekwondo Championships in Muju, Korea and 2019 in Manchester. [2]

Her first coach and club was Atlantas Peristeriou of Nikolaos Papadeas. He then chose to train next to Areti Athanasopoulou. [3]
