= Shahd El-Hosseiny =

Egyptian taekwondo practitioner

Personal information
- Born: 25 September 2004 (age 21)

Sport
- Country: Egypt
- Sport: Taekwondo
- Weight class: 49 kg; 53 kg
Medal record
Women's taekwondo
Representing Egypt
World Championships
Bronze medal – third place	2023 Baku	53 kg
Mediterranean Games
Bronze medal – third place	2022 Oran	49 kg

Shahd El-Hosseiny (born 25 September 2004) is an Egyptian taekwondo practitioner. She won one of the bronze medals in the women's bantamweight event at the 2023 World Taekwondo Championships held in Baku, Azerbaijan. She also won one of the bronze medals in the women's 49 kg event at the 2022 Mediterranean Games held in Oran, Algeria.

In 2022, she competed in the women's flyweight event at the World Taekwondo Championships held in Guadalajara, Mexico where she was eliminated in her second match.

== Achievements ==
Year	Event	Location	Place
2022	Mediterranean Games	Oran, Algeria	3rd
2023	World Championships	Baku, Azerbaijan	3rd
