= Taekwondo at the 2014 Asian Games – Women's 57 kg =

Taekwondo competition

Women's 57 kg at the 2014 Asian Games
- Venue: Ganghwa Dolmens Gymnasium
- Date: 1 October 2014
- Competitors: 19 from 19 nations

Medalists
gold medal	Lee Ah-reum	South Korea
silver medal	Mayu Hamada	Japan
bronze medal	Wang Yun	China
bronze medal	Rangsiya Nisaisom	Thailand

The women's featherweight (57 kilograms) event at the 2014 Asian Games took place on 1 October 2014 at Ganghwa Dolmens Gymnasium, Incheon, South Korea.

== Schedule ==
All times are Korea Standard Time (UTC+09:00)

Date	Time	Event
Wednesday, 1 October 2014	09:30	Round of 32
Wednesday, 1 October 2014	09:30	Round of 16
Wednesday, 1 October 2014	15:30	Quarterfinals
Wednesday, 1 October 2014	15:30	Semifinals
Wednesday, 1 October 2014	18:00	Final

== Results ==
Legend

- W — Won by withdrawal

=== Final ===
Final
Mayu Hamada (JPN)	4
Lee Ah-reum (KOR)	6

=== Top half ===
Round of 32
Aarti Khakal (IND)	8
Ganiya Alzak (KAZ)	15

Round of 16
Eaimdra Aung (MYA)	5
Ganiya Alzak (KAZ)	17
Pauline Lopez (PHI)	0
Wang Yun (CHN)	3
Gyani Chunara (NEP)	3
Mayu Hamada (JPN)	12
Humaira Mohammadi (AFG)	0
Tseng Li-cheng (TPE)	7

Quarterfinals
Ganiya Alzak (KAZ)	1
Wang Yun (CHN)	5
Mayu Hamada (JPN)	4
Tseng Li-cheng (TPE)	2

Semifinals
Wang Yun (CHN)	0
Mayu Hamada (JPN)	0

=== Bottom half ===
Round of 32
Mariska Halinda (INA)	6
Samaneh Sheshpari (IRI)	12
Phạm Thị Hằng (VIE)	7
Thidasavanh Sotthachit (LAO)	6

Round of 16
Makhbuba Sharipova (TJK)	0
Samaneh Sheshpari (IRI)	12
Lee Ah-reum (KOR)	6^{W}
Zorigoogiin Oyuunbileg (MGL)	0
Shahd Al-Tarman (JOR)	1
Rangsiya Nisaisom (THA)	3
Phạm Thị Hằng (VIE)	3
Dilobar Saydullaeva (UZB)	4

Quarterfinals
Samaneh Sheshpari (IRI)	1
Lee Ah-reum (KOR)	13
Rangsiya Nisaisom (THA)	6
Dilobar Saydullaeva (UZB)	2

Semifinals
Lee Ah-reum (KOR)	5
Rangsiya Nisaisom (THA)	1
