= Wenren Yuntao =

Chinese taekwondo practitioner

Personal information
- Nationality: Chinese
- Born: 27 February 1994 (age 32) Yuyao, Ningbo, Zhejiang, China
- Height: 175 cm (5 ft 9 in)
- Weight: 49 kg (108 lb)

Sport
- Sport: Taekwondo
Medal record
Representing China
Women's taekwondo
World Championships
Bronze medal – third place	2017 Muju	Flyweight

Wenren Yuntao (born 27 February 1994) is a Chinese taekwondo practitioner.

She won a bronze medal in flyweight at the 2017 World Taekwondo Championships, after being defeated by Panipak Wongpattanakit in the semifinal. She competed in bantamweight at the 2019 World Taekwondo Championships, where she was defeated by eventual gold medalist Phannapa Harnsujin in the 1/8-finals.
