= Taekwondo at the 2021 Islamic Solidarity Games – Women's 53 kg =

Taekwondo – Women's 53 kg at the 2021 Islamic Solidarity Games
- Venue: Selcuk University 19 Mayis Sport Hall
- Date: 9 August
- Competitors: 17 from 17 nations

Medalists
gold medal	Nahid Kiani	Iran
silver medal	Oumaima El-Bouchti	Morocco
bronze medal	Zeliha Ağrıs	Turkey
bronze medal	Charos Kayumova	Uzbekistan

The women's 53 kg competition in taekwondo at the 2021 Islamic Solidarity Games was held on 9 August 2021 at the Selcuk University 19 Mayis Sport Hall in Konya.

== Results ==
Legend

- PTG — Won by Points Gap
- SUP — Won by superiority
- OT — Won on over time (Golden Point)
- DQ — Won by disqualification
- PUN — Won by punitive declaration
- WD — Won by withdrawal

=== Final ===
Final
Nahid Kiani (IRI)	2
Oumaima El-Bouchti (MAR)	0

=== Top half ===
Round of 32
Kristina Dementeva (KGZ)
Enisa Shabaj (ALB)

Round of 16
Charos Kayumova (UZB)
(25x17px)
Naqsh Hamdani (PAK)
Bidzono Francine (CMR)
Dunya Abutaleb (KSA)
Munirah Abdiwahid (SOM)
Munisa Oimatova (TJK)	0
Nahid Kiani (IRI)	2

Quarterfinals
Charos Kayumova (UZB)
(25x17px)
Munirah Abdiwahid (SOM)	1
Nahid Kiani (IRI)	2

Semifinals
Charos Kayumova (UZB)	0
Nahid Kiani (IRI)	2

=== Bottom half ===
Round of 32

Round of 16
Zeliha Ağrıs (TUR)
Roya Hajiyeva (AZE)
Megawati Tamesti Maheswari (INA)
Bou Habib Mariella (LBN)
Sarr Ndeye Maty (SEN)
Bana Daraghmi (JOR)
Aisha Alnaqbi (UAE)
Oumaima El-Bouchti (MAR)

Quarterfinals
Zeliha Ağrıs (TUR)
(25x17px)
(25x17px)
Oumaima El-Bouchti (MAR)

Semifinals
Zeliha Ağrıs (TUR)
Oumaima El-Bouchti (MAR)
