= Taekwondo at the 2018 Asian Games – Women's 57 kg =

Taekwondo competition

Women's 57 kg at the 2018 Asian Games
- Venue: Jakarta Convention Center
- Date: 21 August 2018
- Competitors: 20 from 20 nations

Medalists
gold medal	Luo Zongshi	China
silver medal	Lee Ah-reum	South Korea
bronze medal	Vipawan Siripornpermsak	Thailand
bronze medal	Pauline Lopez	Philippines

The women's featherweight (57 kilograms) event at the 2018 Asian Games took place on 21 August 2018 at Jakarta Convention Center Plenary Hall, Jakarta, Indonesia.

== Schedule ==
All times are Western Indonesia Time (UTC+07:00)

Date	Time	Event
Tuesday, 21 August 2018	09:00	Round of 32
Tuesday, 21 August 2018	09:00	Round of 16
Tuesday, 21 August 2018	09:00	Quarterfinals
Tuesday, 21 August 2018	15:00	Semifinals
Tuesday, 21 August 2018	15:00	Final

== Results ==
Legend

- W — Won by withdrawal

=== Final ===
Final
Lee Ah-reum (KOR)	5
Luo Zongshi (CHN)	6

=== Top half ===
Round of 32
Cassie Tubbs (CAM)	18
Phạm Thị Thu Hiền (VIE)	19
Evalinda Nadeak (TLS)	2
Charos Kayumova (UZB)	35

Round of 16
Lee Ah-reum (KOR)	14
Phạm Thị Thu Hiền (VIE)	8
Nurul Farah Alisa (MAS)	10
Kashish Malik (IND)	28
Lin Yi-ching (TPE)	2
Rama Abu Al-Rub (JOR)	2
Charos Kayumova (UZB)	27
Vipawan Siripornpermsak (THA)	28

Quarterfinals
Lee Ah-reum (KOR)	17
Kashish Malik (IND)	8
Lin Yi-ching (TPE)	16
Vipawan Siripornpermsak (THA)	37

Semifinals
Lee Ah-reum (KOR)	12
Vipawan Siripornpermsak (THA)	10

=== Bottom half ===
Round of 32
Feng Xiao (MAC)	16
Nimra Wasiq (PAK)	2
Marzhan Tulepbergenova (KAZ)	15
Parisa Javadi (IRI)	10

Round of 16
Pauline Lopez (PHI)	8
Feng Xiao (MAC)	0
Gyani Chunara (NEP)	28
Kinzang Choden (BHU)	6
Norah Al-Marri (KSA)	0
Permata Cinta Nadya (INA)	19^{W}
Marzhan Tulepbergenova (KAZ)	11
Luo Zongshi (CHN)	14

Quarterfinals
Pauline Lopez (PHI)	20
Gyani Chunara (NEP)	0
Permata Cinta Nadya (INA)	2
Luo Zongshi (CHN)	28

Semifinals
Pauline Lopez (PHI)	4
Luo Zongshi (CHN)	11
