= Makayla Greenwood =

American taekwondo practitioner

Sport
- Country: United States
- Sport: Taekwondo
- Weight class: 53 kg
Medal record
Women's taekwondo
Representing United States
World Championships
Gold medal – first place	2022 Guadalajara	53 kg
Pan American Championships
Gold medal – first place	2021 Cancún	53 kg
Gold medal – first place	2022 Punta Cana	53 kg

Makayla Greenwood is an American taekwondo practitioner. She won the gold medal in the women's bantamweight event at the 2022 World Taekwondo Championships held in Guadalajara, Mexico. She is also a two-time gold medalist in her event at the Pan American Taekwondo Championships.
