= Andrea Bokan =

Serbian taekwondo practitioner (born 2004)

Personal information
- Native name: Андреа Бокан
- Born: 1 January 2004 (age 22) Belgrade, Serbia

Sport
- Country: Serbia
- Sport: Taekwondo
- Event: 49 kg
Medal record
Representing Serbia
European Championships
| Silver medal – second place | 2026 Munich | 49 kg |
| Bronze medal – third place | 2024 Belgrade | 53 kg |
World U21 Championships
| Bronze medal – third place | 2025 Nairobi | 49 kg |
European U21 Championships
| Silver medal – second place | 2024 Sarajevo | 53 kg |
Multi European Games
| Gold medal – first place | 2023 Sarajevo | 53 kg |
| Gold medal – first place | 2025 Niš | 53 kg |
| Silver medal – second place | 2022 Sofia | 53 kg |
WT President's Cup Europe
| Silver medal – second place | 2025 Sofia | 53 kg |
European Cadet Championships
| Silver medal – second place | 2017 Budapest | 41 kg |
| Silver medal – second place | 2018 Marina d'Or | 44 kg |

Andrea Bokan (Андреа Бокан; born 1 January 2004) is a Serbian taekwondo practitioner. Competing in the 49 kg division, Bokan represents the Serbia national team.

Bokan won the bronze medal in the women's 53 kg event at the 2024 European Taekwondo Championships, gold at the 2025 European Olympic Weight Categories Championships in Aigle, Switzerland in the 49 kg event, and silver medal in the women's 49 kg event at the 2026 European Taekwondo Championships.
