= Mariska Halinda =

Indonesian taekwondo practitioner

Personal information
- Born: 28 March 1994 (age 32)

Sport
- Country: Indonesia
- Sport: Taekwondo
- Weight class: 53 kg
Medal record
Women's taekwondo
Representing Indonesia
Asian Indoor and Martial Arts Games
Bronze medal – third place	2017 Ashgabat	53 kg
Asian Championships
Bronze medal – third place	2018 Ho Chi Minh City	53 kg
Summer Universiade
Bronze medal – third place	2015 Gwangju	53 kg
Islamic Solidarity Games
Bronze medal – third place	2017 Baku	53 kg
SEA Games
Gold medal – first place	2015 Singapore	53 kg
Gold medal – first place	2017 Kuala Lumpur	53 kg
Silver medal – second place	2019 Philippines	53 kg
Bronze medal – third place	2021 Vietnam	57 kg

Mariska Halinda (born 28 March 1994) is an Indonesian taekwondo practitioner. She is a two-time gold medalist at the SEA Games.

== Career ==
Halinda competed in the women's 57 kg event at the 2014 Asian Games held in Incheon, South Korea. In this competition she was eliminated in her first match by Samaneh Sheshpari of Iran. She represented Indonesia at the 2015 Summer Universiade held in Gwangju, South Korea where she won one of the bronze medals in the women's 53 kg event.

At the 2016 Asian Taekwondo Olympic Qualification Tournament held in Pasay, Philippines, she failed to qualify for the 2016 Summer Olympics in Rio de Janeiro, Brazil as she was eliminated from the competition in her second match.

In 2017, Halinda won one of the bronze medals in the women's 53 kg event at the Islamic Solidarity Games held in Baku, Azerbaijan. In the same year, she also competed in the women's bantamweight event at the 2017 World Taekwondo Championships held in Muju, South Korea. She was eliminated in her third match by Radwa Reda of Egypt. Later that year, she won one of the bronze medals in the women's 53 kg event at the 2017 Asian Indoor and Martial Arts Games held in Ashgabat, Turkmenistan.

In 2018, Halinda won one of the bronze medals in the women's 53 kg event at the Asian Taekwondo Championships held in Ho Chi Minh City, Vietnam. She also represented Indonesia at the 2018 Asian Games in Jakarta, Indonesia in the women's 53 kg event where she was eliminated in her second match by Laetitia Aoun of Lebanon.
