= Huang Yun-wen =

Taiwanese taekwondo practitioner

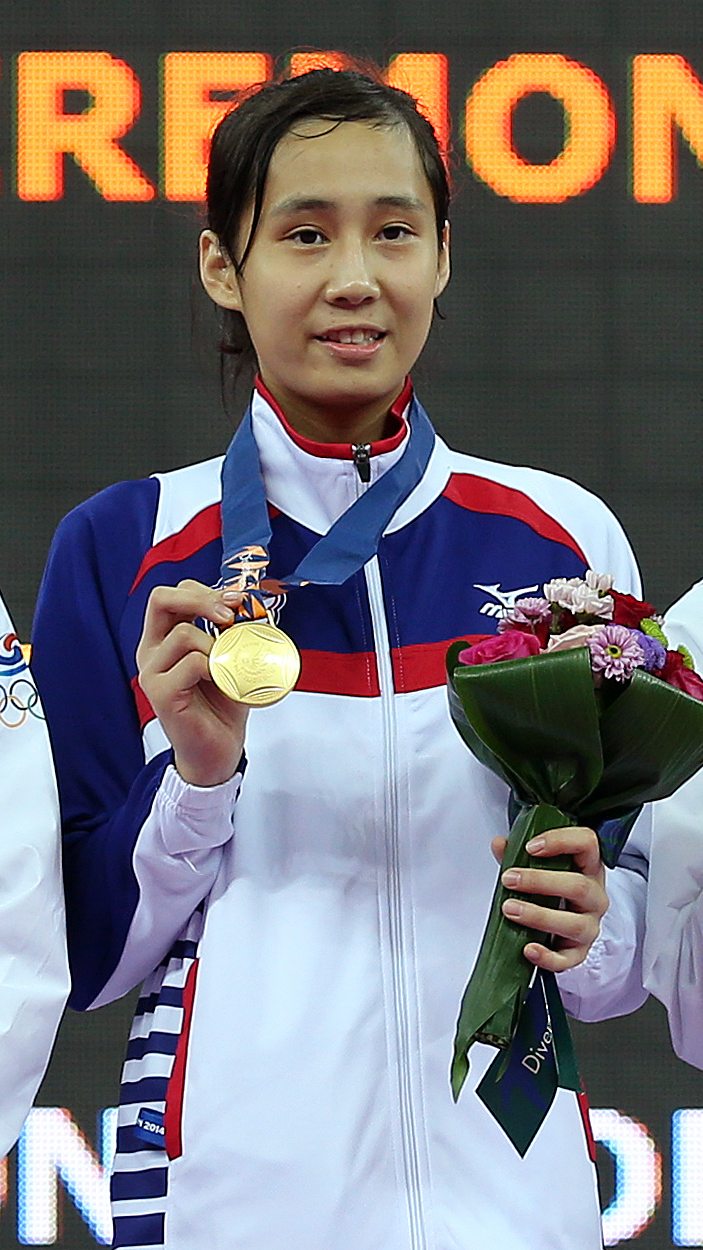

Medal record

Women's taekwondo

Representing Chinese Taipei

World Championships
Silver medal – second place	2015 Chelyabinsk	Bantamweight

Asian Games
Gold medal – first place	2014 Incheon	Bantamweight

Asian Championships
Silver medal – second place	2014 Tashkent	Bantamweight

Huang Yun-wen (Chinese: 黃韻文; pinyin: Huáng Yùnwén; born 4 November 1994) is a Taiwanese taekwondo practitioner. She claimed a silver medal at the 2014 Asian Taekwondo Championships, and a gold medal at 2014 Asian Games. In both competitions, she matched up against South Korea's Yoon Jeong-yeon.
