= Tatiana Minina =

Russian taekwondo practitioner

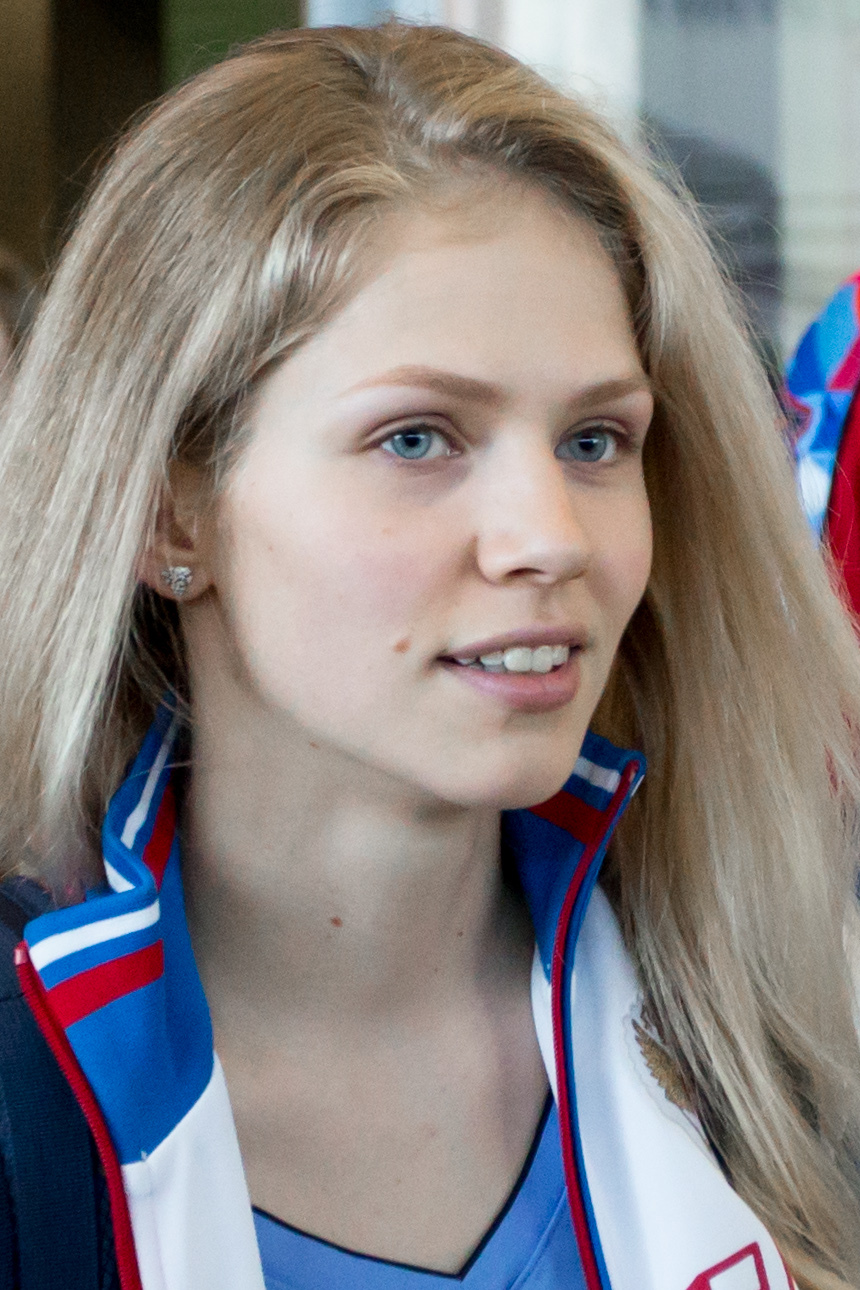
- Minina at the 2018 European Championships

Personal information
- Nationality: (Russia) Russian
- Born: Tatiana Alexeyevna Kudashova; 18 April 1997 (age 29) Chelyabinsk, Russia
- Weight: 53 kg (117 lb)
- Spouse: Konstantin Minin

Sport
- Country: Russia
- Sport: Taekwondo
- Event(s): Bantamweight; Featherweight
- Club: CSKA Moscow
- Coached by: Alexander Ens; Anna Selyutina
Medal record
Women's taekwondo
Representing Individual Neutral Athletes
World Championships
Bronze medal – third place	2023 Baku	53 kg
European Championships
Gold medal – first place	2024 Belgrade	53 kg
Representing (Russia) ROC
Olympic Games
Silver medal – second place	2020 Tokyo	57 kg
Representing Russia
World Championships
Silver medal – second place	2017 Muju	53 kg
Silver medal – second place	2019 Manchester	53 kg
Grand Prix
Bronze medal – third place	2017 London	57 kg
Bronze medal – third place	2017 Abidjan	57 kg
Bronze medal – third place	2018 Rome	57 kg
Bronze medal – third place	2019 Chiba	57 kg
Bronze medal – third place	2019 Sofia	57 kg
European Championships
Gold medal – first place	2016 Montreux	53 kg
Gold medal – first place	2018 Kazan	53 kg
Gold medal – first place	2021 Sofia	53 kg
Youth Olympic Games
Bronze medal – third place	2014 Nanjing	55 kg
European U21 Championships
Gold medal – first place	2015 Bukarest	53 kg
Gold medal – first place	2016 Grozny	53 kg
European Junior Championships
Silver medal – second place	2013 Porto	55 kg

Tatiana Alexeyevna Minina (Russian: Татьяна Алексеевна Минина, IPA: [tɐˈtʲjanə ˈmʲinʲɪnə]; née Kudashova; born 18 April 1997) is a Russian taekwondo athlete. She won the silver medal at the 2017 World Taekwondo Championships in the women's bantamweight category when she was beaten by Zeliha Ağrıs from Turkey.

She is a three-time European champion, winning the gold medal at the 2016, the 2018 and the 2021 European Taekwondo Championships, all in the –53 kg weight category.

She won one of the bronze medals in the women's bantamweight event at the 2023 World Taekwondo Championships held in Baku, Azerbaijan. After the championships, World Taekwondo was to investigate the claim that competing Russian athletes, including Minina, violated the principles of neutrality because they had liked multiple pro-war posts on socia media. In August 2023, Minina also readily accepted awards from the Governor of Chelyabinsk Oblast Aleksey Teksler who is sanctioned by the US and UK for backing Russian invasion of Ukraine. In 2021, Minina had thanked Sergei Shoigu for a medal of Ministry of Defence and posted pictures with him in her social media.
