= Larisa Medvedeva =

Russian taekwondo practitioner

Personal information
- Full name: Larisa Aleksandrovna Medvedeva

Sport
- Country: Russia
- Sport: Taekwondo
Medal record
Women's taekwondo
Representing Russia
European Championships
Silver medal – second place	2021 Sofia	46 kg

Larisa Aleksandrovna Medvedeva (Russian: Лариса Александровна Медведева; born 25 June 2001) is a Russian taekwondo practitioner. She won the silver medal in the women's 46 kg event at the 2021 European Taekwondo Championships held in Sofia, Bulgaria.
