= Lee Ah-reum =

South Korean taekwondo practitioner

Personal information
- Native name: 이아름
- Nationality: South Korean
- Born: 22 April 1992 (age 34) Yeoju, South Korea
- Height: 170 cm (5 ft 7 in)
- Weight: 57 kg (126 lb)

Korean name
- Hangul: 이아름
- RR: I Areum
- MR: I Arŭm
- IPA: [i.aɾɯm]

Sport
- Sport: Taekwondo
Medal record
Women's taekwondo
Representing South Korea
World Championships
Gold medal – first place	2017 Muju	Featherweight
Silver medal – second place	2019 Manchester	Featherweight
Asian Games
Gold medal – first place	2014 Incheon	Featherweight
Silver medal – second place	2018 Jakarta-Palembang	Featherweight
Asian Championships
Gold medal – first place	2014 Tashkent	Featherweight
Silver medal – second place	2016 Manila	Featherweight
Grand Prix
Gold medal – first place	2017 Moscow	–57 kg
Bronze medal – third place	2016 Baku	–57 kg
Gold medal – first place	2019 Rome	57 kg
Silver medal – second place	2019 Sofia	57 kg

Lee Ah-reum (Korean: 이아름; born 22 April 1992) is a South Korean taekwondo athlete. She attended Seoul Physical Education High School (서울체육고등학교) and Korea National Sport University. She won the gold medal at the 2014 Asian Games in the women's featherweight category, defeating Mayu Hamada of Japan. She won the gold medal at the 2017 World Taekwondo Championships in the women's featherweight category, beating the Olympic champion Jade Jones in the semi-finals and Hatice Kübra İlgün of Turkey in the final. She has a history of participating in the Asian games.
