= Vipawan Siripornpermsak =

Thai taekwondo practitioner

Personal information
- Born: 9 May 2000 (age 26)

Sport
- Country: Thailand
- Sport: Taekwondo
- Weight class: 57 kg
Medal record
Women's taekwondo
Representing Thailand
Asian Games
Bronze medal – third place	2018 Jakarta	57 kg
Southeast Asian Games
Bronze medal – third place	2019 Manila	57 kg

Vipawan Siripornpermsak (born 9 May 2000) is a Thai taekwondo practitioner. In 2018, she won one of the bronze medals in the women's 57 kg event at the 2018 Asian Games held in Jakarta, Indonesia.

In 2019, she competed in the women's featherweight event at the 2019 World Taekwondo Championships held in Manchester, United Kingdom where she lost her first match against Fernanda Aguirre of Chile.
