= Kristina Tomić =

Croatian taekwondo practitioner

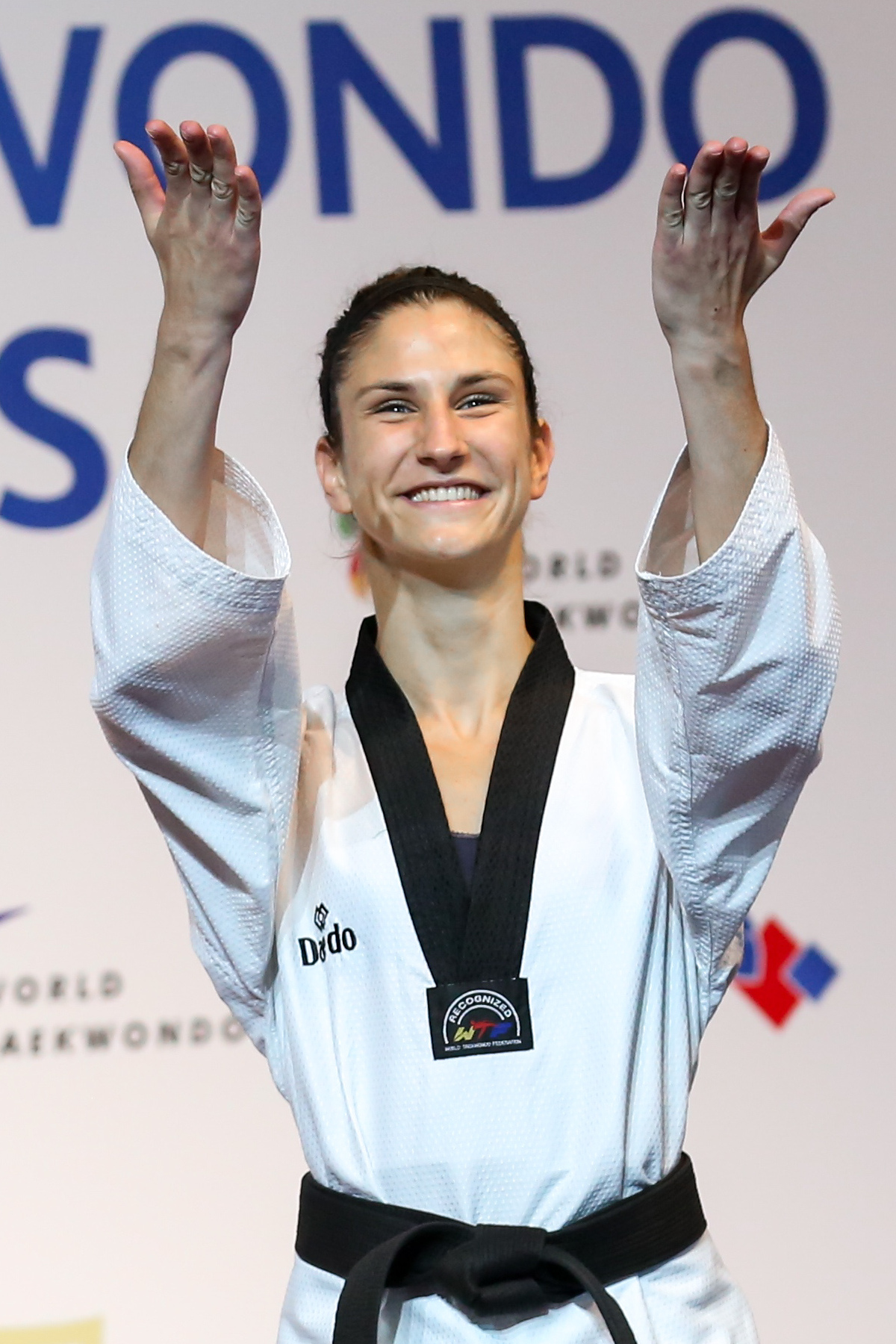

Personal information
- Nickname: Kristina Tomic
- Citizenship: Croatia
- Born: 29 March 1995 (age 31) Zagreb, Croatia

Sport
- Country: Croatia
- Sport: Taekwondo
- Event: 49 kg
- Club: TKD Osvit Zagreb
Medal record
Representing Croatia
Women's taekwondo
World Championships
| Bronze medal – third place | 2017 Muju | 49 kg |
| Bronze medal – third place | 2019 Manchester | 49 kg |
Grand Prix
| Bronze medal – third place | 2018 Moscow | 49 kg |
European Games
| Bronze medal – third place | 2023 Kraków-Małopolska | 57 kg |
European Championships
| Gold medal – first place | 2018 Kazan | 49 kg |
Grand Slam (Qualification)
| Silver medal – second place | 2017 Wuxi | 49 kg |

Kristina Tomić (born 29 March 1995) is a Croatian taekwondo practitioner. She won the bronze medal at the 2017 World Taekwondo Championships on the women's flyweight category. She has type 1 diabetes.

She competed in the women's featherweight event at the 2022 World Taekwondo Championships held in Guadalajara, Mexico.
