= Park Hye-jin (taekwondo) =

South Korean taekwondo practitioner (born 1999)

Personal information
- Born: 30 July 1999 (age 27)

Sport
- Sport: Taekwondo
Medal record
Representing South Korea
Asian Games
Gold medal – first place	2022 Hangzhou	53 kg
Asian Championships
Bronze medal – third place	2024 Da Nang	49 kg

Park Hye-jin (born 30 July 1999) is a South Korean taekwondo practitioner. She was a gold medalist at the 2022 Asian Games.

== Career ==
Park reached the second round at the 2019 World Taekwondo Championships and the third round at the 2022 World Taekwondo Championships.

Park was a gold medalist at the delayed 2022 Asian Games held in Hangzhou, China, in September 2023, winning the women's 53 kg division, defeating Lin Wei Chun of Chinese Taipei 2-1 in the final.

Park secured an Asian Championships debut with her performance in the 53 kg at the 2024 South Korean Taekwondo National Team Selection held at Taebaek Gowon Gymnasium in February 2024. She subsequently won a bronze medal at the 2024 Asian Taekwondo Championships in Da Nang, Vietnam in May 2024.

== Personal life ==
She is based in Goyang.
