= Zeynep Taşkın =

Turkish taekwondo practitioner

Personal information
- Born: 3 December 2003 (age 22) Çanakkale, Turkey
- Height: 160 cm (5 ft 3 in)
- Weight: 53 kg (117 lb)

Sport
- Country: Turkey
- Sport: Taekwondo
- Club: Çanakkale Lapseki
Medal record
Representing Turkey
Men's taekwondo
European Championships
Silver medal – second place	2024 Belgrade	53 kg
European U21 Championships
Bronze medal – third place	2023 Bucharest	53 kg
European Cadets Championships
Gold medal – first place	2015 Strasbourg	29 kg

Zeynep Taşkın (born 3 December 2003) is a Turkish taekwondo athlete who won the silver medal at the 2024 European Taekwondo Championships.

== Career ==
In 2024, Zeynep Taşkın won the silver medal at the 2024 European Taekwondo Championships in Belgrade, Serbia, losing to Russian Tatiana Minina in the final match in the women's 53 kg category. She had reached the final by defeating Israeli Biana Lager in the second round, German Madeline Folgmann in the quarterfinals and Bosnian Ada Avdagić in the semifinals.
