= Dinorahon Mamadibragimova =

Uzbekistani taekwondo practitioner

Personal information
- Nationality: Uzbekistani
- Born: 8 June 1997 (age 29)

Sport
- Sport: Taekwondo
Medal record
Representing Uzbekistan
Women's taekwondo
World Championships
| Bronze medal – third place | 2017 Muju | Bantamweight |
Military World Games
| Silver medal – second place | 2019 Wuhan | Women's 57 kg |

Dinorahon Mamadibragimova (born 8 June 1997) is an Uzbekistani taekwondo practitioner.

She won a bronze medal in bantamweight at the 2017 World Taekwondo Championships, after being defeated by Zeliha Ağrıs in the semifinal.
