= Inese Tarvida =

Latvian taekwondo athlete (born 1998)

Personal information
- Nationality: Latvian
- Born: 16 November 1998 (age 27) Bauska
- Height: 175 cm (5 ft 9 in)
- Weight: 56 kg (123 lb)

Sport
- Country: Latvia
- Sport: Taekwondo
- Event: –53 kg
- Club: TCC Friedrichshafen
- Team: LAT
- Coached by: Markus Kohlöffel

Achievements and titles
- Highest world ranking: 2
Medal record
Representing Latvia
World Championships
Bronze medal – third place	2017 Muju	53 kg
Bronze medal – third place	2019 Manchester	53 kg
Grand Prix
Bronze medal – third place	2018 Taoyuan	57 kg
European Championships
Silver medal – second place	2018 Kazan	53 kg

Inese Tarvida (born November 16, 1998) is a Latvian taekwondo athlete who represents Latvia. She won the bronze medal at the 2017 World Taekwondo Championships in the Women's bantamweight category.

In 2019, she represented Latvia at the 2019 Summer Universiade in Naples, Italy and she won one of the bronze medals in the women's 53 kg event.
