= Zuo Ju =

Chinese taekwondo practitioner

Personal information
- Born: 10 February 2000 (age 26)

Sport
- Country: China
- Sport: Taekwondo
- Weight class: 53 kg
Medal record
Women's taekwondo
Representing China
World Championships
Silver medal – second place	2022 Guadalajara	53 kg
Silver medal – second place	2023 Baku	53 kg
Asian Championships
Gold medal – first place	2026 Ulaanbaatar	53 kg

Zuo Ju (born 10 February 2000) is a Chinese taekwondo practitioner. She is a two-time silver medalist in the women's 53 kg event at the World Taekwondo Championships.

== Career ==
In 2022, she won the silver medal in the women's bantamweight event at the World Taekwondo Championships held in Guadalajara, Mexico. She also won the silver medal in the women's bantamweight event at the 2023 World Taekwondo Championships held in Baku, Azerbaijan.

In 2017, she competed in the women's −49 kg event at the Asian Indoor and Martial Arts Games held in Ashgabat, Turkmenistan where she was eliminated in her second match.

== Achievements ==
Year	Event	Location	Place
2022	World Championships	Guadalajara, Mexico	2nd
2023	World Championships	Baku, Azerbaijan	2nd
