= Blanca Palmer =

Spanish taekwondo practitioner

Personal information
- Full name: Blanca Palmer Soler
- Nationality: Spanish
- Born: 10 February 1999 (age 27) Gandía, Spain

Sport
- Sport: Taekwondo
- Event: –49 kg
- Team: ESP
Medal record
Representing Spain
European Championships
Silver medal – second place	2016 Montreux	49 kg
World Junior Championships
Silver medal – second place	2014 Taipei	42 kg
European Cadet Championships
Gold medal – first place	2013 Bukarest	41 kg
- Updated on 25 June 2017

Blanca Palmer Soler (born 10 February 1999) is a Spanish taekwondo athlete.
