= Zeliha Ağrıs =

Turkish taekwondo practitioner

Personal information
- Born: 20 January 1998 (age 28) Beyşehir, Konya Province, Turkey
- Education: Sports science Selçuk University
- Years active: 2008–
- Height: 1.74 m (5 ft 8 1/2 in)

Sport
- Country: Turkey
- Sport: Taekwondo
- Event: Bantamweight
Medal record
Women's taekwondo
Representing Turkey
World Championships
Gold medal – first place	2017 Muju	53 kg
European Championships
Gold medal – first place	2022 Manchester	53 kg
Silver medal – second place	2021 Sofia	53 kg
Bronze medal – third place	2016 Montreux	53 kg
Islamic Solidarity Games
Silver medal – second place	2017 Baku	53 kg
Bronze medal – third place	2021 Konya	53 kg
World Grand Prix
Bronze medal – third place	2018 Rome	49 kg
Bronze medal – third place	2018 Moscow	49 kg
European U21 Championships
Bronze medal – third place	2018 Warsaw	53 kg
Bronze medal – third place	2017 Sofia	53 kg
European Junior Championships
Bronze medal – third place	2013 Porto	55 kg

Zeliha Ağrıs (born 20 January 1998) is a Turkish taekwondo practitioner who became a world champion in the bantamweight category in 2017.

== Private life ==
Zeliha Ağrıs was born in Beyşehir, Konya Province, Turkey, on 20 January 1998. She grew up in Konya, where her father runs a restaurant.

She was a very energetic girl in her childhood. She was impressed by taekwondo practitioners performing in a nearby gym. In the beginning, her father was not willing to let his daughter perform taekwondo. A trainer in the gym persuaded her father. She started performing taekwondo at age ten. Her parents supported her later on.

She is a student in the School of Sports science at Selçuk University in Konya.

== Sport career ==
She debuted internationally at the 2011 European Cadets Taekwondo Championships held in Tbilisi, Georgia, competing in the -41 kg event.

She won her first international medal at the 2013 European Junior Taekwondo Championships in Porto, Portugal, reaching bronze in the -55 kg event. In 2014, she took the silver medal in the -55 kg event at the Telleborg Open in Sweden. Ağrıs received the gold medal at the 2015 European Junior Taekwondo Championships in Daugavpils, Latvia. She captured the bronze medal at the 2016 European Taekwondo Championships in Montreux, Switzerland. She took the bronze medal at the ETU European Under 21 Taekwondo Championships 2017 in Sofia, Bulgaria, the silver medal at the 2017 Islamic Solidarity Games in Baku, Azerbaijan, and the gold medal at the 2017 World Taekwondo Championships in Muju, South Korea, in the bantamweight category when she was 19 years of age. She had beaten the bronze medallist, Dinorahon Mamadibragimova, in the semi-final before beating Tatiana Kudashova 11–8 in the final.

Ağrıs won a bronze medal in Rome, another in Moscow at the 2018 World Taekwondo Grand Prix. The same year, she won another bronze medal at the European Taekwondo Under 21 Championships in Warsaw. At the G4 Extra European Taekwondo Championships held in Bari, Italy, in 2019, she captured the silver medal in the -53 kg event. In 2020, she won the gold medal at the 8th Open European Clubs Championships in Zagreb, Croatia. She won the silver medal in the -53 kg event at the 2021 European Taekwondo Championships in Sofia.

== Tournament record ==
Year	Event	Location	G-Rank	Place
2022	European Championships	(United Kingdom) Manchester	G-4	1st
2022	Sweden Open	(Sweden) Stockholm	G-1	2nd
2021	European Championships	(Bulgaria) Sofia	G-4	2nd
2021	WT Presidents Cup - Europe	(Turkey) Istanbul	G-1	3rd
2020	European Clubs Championships	(Croatia) Zagreb	G-1	1st
2020	German Open	(Germany) Hamburg	G-1	1st
2020	Fujairah Open	(United Arab Emirates) Fujairah	G-1	3rd
2019	Extra European Championships	(Italy) Bari	G-4	2nd
2019	Dutch Open	(Netherlands) Nijmegen	G-1	3rd
2019	US Open	(United States) Las Vegas	G-1	3rd
2018	Grand Prix	(Russia) Moscow	G-4	3rd
2018	Grand Prix	(Italy) Rome	G-4	3rd
2018	European U-21 Championships	(Poland) Warsaw	G-4	3rd
2018	Belgian Open	(Belgium) Lommel	G-1	1st
2018	Spanish Open	(Spain) Alicante	G-1	3rd
2018	Egypt Open	(Egypt) Alexandria	G-1	3rd
2018	Sofia Open	(Bulgaria) Sofia	G-1	3rd
2017	World Championships	(Morocco) Rabat	G-12	1st
2017	European U-21 Championships	(Bulgaria) Sofia	G-4	3rd
2017	European Clubs Championships	(Turkey) Antalya	G-1	3rd
2016	WT Presidents Cup - Europe	(Germany) Bonn	G-1	1st
2016	Serbia Open	(Serbia) Belgrad	G-1	1st
2016	German Open	(Germany) Hamburg	G-1	2nd
2016	Croatia Open	(Croatia) Zagreb	G-1	2nd
2016	European Clubs Championships	(Turkey) Antalya	G-1	3rd
2016	European Championships	(France) Montreux	G-4	3rd
2014	European Clubs Championships	(Turkey) Antalya	G-1	1st
2014	Turkish Open	(Turkey) Antalya	G-1	2nd
2014	Trelleborg Open	(Sweden) Trelleborg	G-1	3rd
2013	European Youth Championships	(Portugal) Porto	G-4	3rd
