= Taekwondowon =

Taekwondo training and competition complex

- Location: Muju, South Korea
- Capacity: 4,571 (arena); 423 (indoor theater)

Construction
- Cost: KRW 247,5 billion (≈ USD 168 million)
- Architect: Samoo Architects & Engineers

Tenant
- 2017 World Taekwondo Championships

The Taekwondowon (Hangul: 태권도원) is a Taekwondo venue and park that opened in 2014 and is located in Muju, South Korea. It occupies 2.3 square kilometers (about 568 acres) and is managed by the World Taekwondo Federation. It claims to be the largest training space for Taekwondo practitioners, a pilgrimage site for practitioners worldwide, and to be a "holy ground" for Taekwondo.

The venue contains three Olympic-grade competition areas and has been the site of numerous training camps and competitions. Many important Taekwondo competitions have been held at the Taekwondowon, including the 2022, 2023, and 2025 World Taekwondo Grand Prix Challenges, the 2017 World Taekwondo Championships, and the 2026 World Para Taekwondo Championships.

It hosts the World Taekwondo academy, which offers courses and instruction on Taekwondo techniques. As of 2026, the theater building offers 40 minute performances of Taekwon Beat Final, featuring artistic poomsae, board-breaking, and sparring, with an admission fee of ₩10,000 (≈$6.80).

The Taekwondowon is also home to the National Taekwondo Museum, which contains documents, uniforms, art, photographs, and information on the history of Taekwondo, including some designated as cultural heritage.

In February of 2026, the Taekwondowon was designated the first official Virtual Taekwondo Central Training Center, furthering the role of Taekwondo as an esport and training participants to spar digitally using VR.

Other areas on the site include dorms, restaurants, gardens, a traditional Taekwondo training area, pavilions, and an observatory accessible by sky tram.
