= World Taekwondo Grand Slam =

Taekwondo competition

- Current event or competition: 2023 World Taekwondo Grand Slam

Competition details
- Discipline: Taekwondo
- Type: kyourugui, annual
- Organiser: World Taekwondo (WT)

History
- First edition: 2017
- Final edition: 2019
- Most wins: 19 medals South Korea

The World Taekwondo Grand Slam was an annual taekwondo competition held from 2017 to 2019 in Wuxi, China, featuring the athletes who had the best results at international competitions that year.

== Editions ==
| Year | Date(s) | City and host country | Venue |
|---|---|---|---|
| 2017 | 30 December 2017 – 27 January 2018 | Wuxi, China | Wuxi Taihu International Expo Center |
| 2018 | 9–16 December 2018 | Wuxi, China | Wuxi Taihu International Expo Center |
| 2019 | 18–20 December 2020 | Wuxi, China | Wuxi Taihu International Expo Center |

== All-time medal table ==
All-time medal count as of 20 December 2019 at the 2019 World Taekwondo Grand Slam.

| Rank | Nation | Gold | Silver | Bronze | Total |
|---|---|---|---|---|---|
| 1 | South Korea | 9 | 7 | 3 | 19 |
| 2 | China | 3 | 6 | 10 | 19 |
| 3 | Great Britain | 3 | 5 | 0 | 8 |
| 4 | Russia | 3 | 1 | 3 | 7 |
| 5 | Thailand | 2 | 0 | 0 | 2 |
| 6 | Turkey | 1 | 1 | 1 | 3 |
| 7 | Croatia | 1 | 1 | 0 | 2 |
| 8 | Iran | 1 | 0 | 2 | 3 |
| 9 | Ivory Coast | 1 | 0 | 1 | 2 |
| 10 | United States | 0 | 2 | 0 | 2 |
| 11 | Serbia | 0 | 1 | 0 | 1 |
| 12 | Azerbaijan | 0 | 0 | 2 | 2 |
| 13 | Poland | 0 | 0 | 1 | 1 |
| 13 | Uzbekistan | 0 | 0 | 1 | 1 |
| Totals (14 entries) | | 24 | 24 | 24 | 72 |
