= Alma Pérez =

Spanish taekwondo practitioner (born 2000)

Personal information
- Full name: Alma Maria Pérez Parrado
- Born: 21 December 2001 (age 24)

Sport
- Sport: Taekwondo
Medal record
Representing Spain
European Games
Silver medal – second place	2023 Kraków-Małopolska	53 kg
World University Games
Bronze medal – third place	2021 Chengdu	53 kg

Alma Maria Pérez Parrado (born 21 December 2001) is a Spanish taekwondo practitioner.

== Career ==
Perez won the silver medal at the World Taekwondo Women's Open Championships held in Saudi Arabia's capital Riyadh in 2021, facing Merve Dinçel in the final. She started the event as the seventh seed and defeated double Olympic medalist Tijana Bogdanovic on her way to the final.

Perez was a bronze medalist at the delayed 2021 Summer World University Games held in August 2023 in Chengdu, China, in the women's 53 kg division. That year, she was also a medalist at the 2023 European Games in the women's 53 kg division, winning silver in Kraków after facing Croatia's Ivana Duvancic in the final.

Perez was selected to represent Spain at the 2025 World Taekwondo Championships in Wuxi, China, in the women's bantamweight division in October 2025.

== Personal life ==
She is from A Barbanza and trained at Castado Taekwondo Boiro in Boiro, Galicia. She studied at the Autonomous University of Barcelona.
