= Rahma Ben Ali =

Tunisian taekwondo athlete

Personal information
- Nationality: Tunisian
- Born: 15 September 1993 (age 32)

Sport
- Sport: Taekwondo
- Coached by: Rached Khiari

Rahma Ben Ali (born 15 September 1993) is a Tunisian taekwondo athlete.

She represented Tunisia at the 2016 Summer Olympics in Rio de Janeiro, in the women's 57 kg. She had previously competed at the 2010 Youth Olympics.

== Personal life ==
Rahma Ben Ali was born in Tunis on 15 September 1993.
