= Madeline Folgmann =

German athlete (born 1997)

Personal information
- Born: 16 January 1997 (age 29)

Sport
- Country: Germany
- Sport: Taekwondo
- Event: –53 kg
- Club: TG Jeong Eui Nettetal
- Coached by: Björn Pistel

Achievements and titles
- Regional finals: 3rd place, bronze medalist(s)
- Highest world ranking: 3 (2024)
Medal record
Women's Taekwondo
Representing Germany
World University Games
Bronze medal – third place	2017 Taipei	53 kg
European Championships
Bronze medal – third place	2018 Kazan	53 kg
European Universities Games
Silver medal – second place	2024 Debrecen-Miskolc	53 kg
European Under 21 Championships
Gold medal – first place	2017 Sofia	53 kg

Madeline Folgmann (born 16 January 1997) is a German taekwondo athlete and European bronze medalist.

== Career ==
Madeline Folgmann began practising taekwondo at the age of five and has been competing for the German national team since 2014. In 2014, she took part in the Youth Olympic Games in Nanjing in the weight class up to 55 kg. She reached the round of 16, but lost to her opponent Tijana Bogdanović by 12 to 16 points. At national level, she became German champion three times, runner-up three times and bronze medallist twice in the cadet and junior categories.

At the U21 European Championships in Sofia, Folgmann won the gold medal in the weight class up to 53 kg. In the same year, she achieved a bronze medal in the same weight class at the World University Games (then: Summer Universiade). In 2018, she won another bronze medal at the European Senior Championships in Kazan.

In 2024, Folgmann achieved a 5th place at the European Championships in Belgrade. At the 2024 European Universities Games in Debrecen-Miskolc, she was defeated in the final by Spanish athlete Alma Pérez Parrado and thus became runner-up in the weight class up to 53 kg.

== Personal life ==
Folgmann began studying Sports Science at the German Sport University Cologne in 2016. She completed her bachelor's degree in 2021 and then continued her studies with a master's programme.
