= Su Po-ya =

Taiwanese taekwondo practitioner

Personal information
- Nationality: Taiwanese
- Born: 17 September 1998 (age 27)
- Height: 170 cm (5 ft 7 in)
- Weight: 55 kg (121 lb)

Sport
- Country: Chinese Taipei
- Sport: Taekwondo
- Event: bantamweight
Medal record
Representing Chinese Taipei
Women's taekwondo
Asian Championships
Bronze medal – third place	2024 Da Nang	53 kg
Asian Games
Gold medal – first place	2018 Jakarta	53 kg
World University Games
Silver medal – second place	2021 Chengdu	53 kg

Su Po-ya (Chinese: 蘇柏亞; pinyin: Sū Bǎiyà, born 17 September 1998) is a Taiwanese taekwondo practitioner. She represented Chinese Taipei at the 2018 Asian Games and claimed a gold medal in the women's 53kg bantamweight event.
