= Lim Geum-byeol =

South Korean taekwondo practitioner

Personal information
- Nationality: South Korean
- Born: 23 June 1998 (age 28)

Sport
- Sport: Taekwondo
Medal record
Representing South Korea
Women's taekwondo
World Championships
Gold medal – first place	2015 Chelyabinsk	Bantamweight
World University Games
Bronze medal – third place	2021 Chengdu	Team

Lim Geum-byeol (born 23 June 1998) is a South Korean taekwondo practitioner.

She won a gold medal in bantamweight at the 2015 World Taekwondo Championships in Chelyabinsk.
