= Dominika Hronová =

Czech taekwondo practitioner (born 1999)

Dominika Hronová (born 6 January 1999) is a Czech taekwondo practitioner. Representing the Czech Republic at the 2024 Summer Olympics, she competed in the women's 57kg taekwondo event where she lost to Canadian Skylar Park. Hronova was named Vysočina Region Female Athlete of the Year 2024 for her Olympics appearance and her fifth-place finish at the European Championships.
