= Phannapa Harnsujin =

Thai taekwondo practitioner

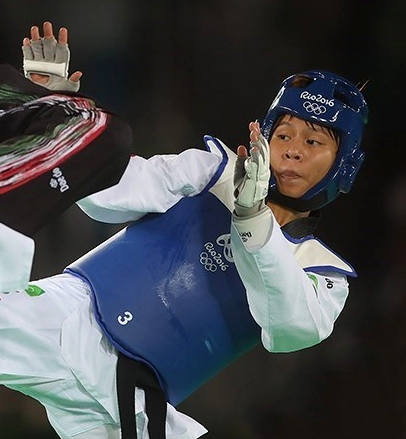
- Phannapa Harnsujin at the 2016 Olympics

Personal information
- Nickname: Nok (นก)
- Nationality: Thai
- Born: 14 September 1997 (age 29)
- Height: 172 cm (5 ft 8 in)

Sport
- Country: Thailand
- Sport: Taekwondo
Medal record
Women's taekwondo
Representing Thailand
World Championships
Gold medal – first place	2019 Manchester	-53 kg
Asian Games
Bronze medal – third place	2022 Hangzhou	-57 kg
Asian Championships
Silver medal – second place	2018 Ho Chi Minh City	53 kg
Bronze medal – third place	2022 Chuncheon	57 kg
Asian Indoor and Martial Arts Games
Silver medal – second place	2017 Ashgabat	-53 kg
Grand Prix
Bronze medal – third place	2019 Chiba	-57 kg
Southeast Asian Games
Gold medal – first place	2013 Myanmar	-49 kg
Gold medal – first place	2021 Vietnam	-57 kg
Gold medal – first place	2023 Cambodia	-57 kg
Silver medal – second place	2015 Singapore	-53 kg
Bronze medal – third place	2019 Philippines	-53 kg
Asian Junior Championships
Gold medal – first place	2013 Jakarta	-52 kg

Phannapa Harnsujin (Thai: พรรณนภา หาญสุจินต์; born 14 September 1997) is a Thai taekwondo practitioner. She won a gold and a silver medal at the Southeast Asian Games in 2013 and 2015, respectively, and competed in the 57 kg division at the 2016 Summer Olympics. She dedicated her 2013 gold medal to her father, who died in an accident earlier that year.

In 2021, she competed at the 2021 Asian Taekwondo Olympic Qualification Tournament held in Amman, Jordan hoping to qualify for the 2020 Summer Olympics in Tokyo, Japan.
