= 2017 World Taekwondo Championships =

Taekwondo competition

- Venue: Taekwondowon
- Location: Muju, South Korea
- Dates: 24–30 June 2017
- Competitors: 945 from 177 nations

Champions
- Men: South Korea
- Women: South Korea

The 2017 World Taekwondo Championships was the 23rd edition of the World Taekwondo Championships, and was held in Muju, South Korea from 24 to 30 June 2017.

== Medal summary ==
=== Men ===
Event	Gold	Silver	Bronze
Finweight (−54 kg)	Kim Tae-hun; South Korea	Armin Hadipour; Iran	Vito Dell'Aquila; Italy
Finweight (−54 kg)	Kim Tae-hun; South Korea	Armin Hadipour; Iran	Ramnarong Sawekwiharee; Thailand
Flyweight (−58 kg)	Jeong Yun-jo; South Korea	Mikhail Artamonov; Russia	Carlos Navarro; Mexico
Flyweight (−58 kg)	Jeong Yun-jo; South Korea	Mikhail Artamonov; Russia	Jesús Tortosa; Spain
Bantamweight (−63 kg)	Zhao Shuai; China	Mirhashem Hosseini; Iran	Bradly Sinden; Great Britain
Bantamweight (−63 kg)	Zhao Shuai; China	Mirhashem Hosseini; Iran	Mahammad Mammadov; Azerbaijan
Featherweight (−68 kg)	Lee Dae-hoon; South Korea	Huang Yu-jen; Chinese Taipei	Vladimir Dalakliev; Bulgaria
Featherweight (−68 kg)	Lee Dae-hoon; South Korea	Huang Yu-jen; Chinese Taipei	Ahmad Abughaush; Jordan
Lightweight (−74 kg)	Maksim Khramtsov; Russia	Nikita Rafalovich; Uzbekistan	Masoud Hajji-Zavareh; Iran
Lightweight (−74 kg)	Maksim Khramtsov; Russia	Nikita Rafalovich; Uzbekistan	Kairat Sarymsakov; Kazakhstan
Welterweight (−80 kg)	Milad Beigi; Azerbaijan	Anton Kotkov; Russia	Damon Sansum; Great Britain
Welterweight (−80 kg)	Milad Beigi; Azerbaijan	Anton Kotkov; Russia	Aaron Cook; Moldova
Middleweight (−87 kg)	Alexander Bachmann; Germany	Vladislav Larin; Russia	In Kyo-don; South Korea
Middleweight (−87 kg)	Alexander Bachmann; Germany	Vladislav Larin; Russia	Ivan Trajkovič; Slovenia
Heavyweight (+87 kg)	Abdoul Razak Issoufou; Niger	Mahama Cho; Great Britain	Anthony Obame; Gabon
Heavyweight (+87 kg)	Abdoul Razak Issoufou; Niger	Mahama Cho; Great Britain	Roman Kuznetsov; Russia

=== Women ===
Event	Gold	Silver	Bronze
Finweight (−46 kg)	Sim Jae-young; South Korea	Trương Thị Kim Tuyền; Vietnam	Andrea Ramírez; Colombia
Finweight (−46 kg)	Sim Jae-young; South Korea	Trương Thị Kim Tuyền; Vietnam	Napaporn Charanawat; Thailand
Flyweight (−49 kg)	Vanja Stanković; Serbia	Panipak Wongpattanakit; Thailand	Wenren Yuntao; China
Flyweight (−49 kg)	Vanja Stanković; Serbia	Panipak Wongpattanakit; Thailand	Kristina Tomić; Croatia
Bantamweight (−53 kg)	Zeliha Ağrıs; Turkey	Tatiana Kudashova; Russia	Dinorahon Mamadibragimova; Uzbekistan
Bantamweight (−53 kg)	Zeliha Ağrıs; Turkey	Tatiana Kudashova; Russia	Inese Tarvida; Latvia
Featherweight (−57 kg)	Lee Ah-reum; South Korea	Hatice Kübra İlgün; Turkey	Jade Jones; Great Britain
Featherweight (−57 kg)	Lee Ah-reum; South Korea	Hatice Kübra İlgün; Turkey	Nikita Glasnović; Sweden
Lightweight (−62 kg)	Ruth Gbagbi; Ivory Coast	Kimia Alizadeh; Iran	Kim So-hee; South Korea
Lightweight (−62 kg)	Ruth Gbagbi; Ivory Coast	Kimia Alizadeh; Iran	Tatiana Kuzmina; Russia
Welterweight (−67 kg)	Nur Tatar; Turkey	Paige McPherson; United States	Kim Jan-di; South Korea
Welterweight (−67 kg)	Nur Tatar; Turkey	Paige McPherson; United States	Zhang Mengyu; China
Middleweight (−73 kg)	Milica Mandić; Serbia	Oh Hye-ri; South Korea	María Espinoza; Mexico
Middleweight (−73 kg)	Milica Mandić; Serbia	Oh Hye-ri; South Korea	Reshmie Oogink; Netherlands
Heavyweight (+73 kg)	Bianca Walkden; Great Britain	Jackie Galloway; United States	An Sae-bom; South Korea
Heavyweight (+73 kg)	Bianca Walkden; Great Britain	Jackie Galloway; United States	Zheng Shuyin; China

== Medal table ==
Rank	Nation	Gold	Silver	Bronze	Total
1	South Korea	5	1	4	10
2	Turkey	2	1	0	3
3	Serbia	2	0	0	2
4	Russia	1	4	2	7
5	Great Britain	1	1	3	5
6	China	1	0	3	4
7	Azerbaijan	1	0	1	2
8	Germany	1	0	0	1
8	Ivory Coast	1	0	0	1
8	Niger	1	0	0	1
11	Iran	0	3	1	4
12	United States	0	2	0	2
13	Thailand	0	1	2	3
14	Uzbekistan	0	1	1	2
15	Chinese Taipei	0	1	0	1
15	Vietnam	0	1	0	1
17	Mexico	0	0	2	2
18	Bulgaria	0	0	1	1
18	Colombia	0	0	1	1
18	Croatia	0	0	1	1
18	Gabon	0	0	1	1
18	Italy	0	0	1	1
18	Jordan	0	0	1	1
18	Kazakhstan	0	0	1	1
18	Latvia	0	0	1	1
18	Moldova	0	0	1	1
18	Netherlands	0	0	1	1
18	Slovenia	0	0	1	1
18	Spain	0	0	1	1
18	Sweden	0	0	1	1
Totals (30 entries)		16	16	32	64

== Team ranking ==
=== Men ===
Rank	Team	Points
1	South Korea	67
2	Russia	62
3	Iran	46
4	Azerbaijan	40
5	Great Britain	40
6	China	35
7	Chinese Taipei	32
8	Mexico	31
9	Uzbekistan	29
10	Kazakhstan	29

=== Women ===
Rank	Team	Points
1	South Korea	63
2	Turkey	53
3	Serbia	38
4	United States	33
5	Great Britain	32
6	Russia	32
7	China	31
8	Ivory Coast	26
9	Mexico	26
10	Croatia	26

== Participating nations ==
A total of 945 athletes from 177 nations and the refugee team (under the name of World Taekwondo Federation) participated.

- Afghanistan (4)
- Albania (5)
- Algeria (6)
- Andorra (2)
- Argentina (3)
- Armenia (3)
- Aruba (1)
- Australia (16)
- Austria (6)
- Azerbaijan (12)
- Bangladesh (4)
- Barbados (1)
- Belarus (6)
- Belgium (9)
- Bhutan (3)
- Bolivia (3)
- Bosnia and Herzegovina (1)
- Botswana (5)
- Brazil (16)
- Brunei (1)
- Bulgaria (6)
- Burkina Faso (1)
- Burundi (1)
- Cambodia (5)
- Cameroon (2)
- Canada (16)
- Cape Verde (1)
- Chile (6)
- China (16)
- Chinese Taipei (16)
- Colombia (13)
- Comoros (1)
- Congo (1)
- Congo DR (6)
- Costa Rica (2)
- Croatia (12)
- Cuba (8)
- Curaçao (1)
- Cyprus (10)
- Czech Republic (3)
- Denmark (2)
- Djibouti (2)
- Dominican Republic (10)
- East Timor (2)
- Ecuador (6)
- Egypt (13)
- Estonia (1)
- Ethiopia (3)
- Fiji (1)
- Finland (2)
- France (9)
- French Guiana (4)
- French Polynesia (4)
- Gabon (2)
- Georgia (2)
- Germany (14)
- Ghana (2)
- Great Britain (14)
- Greece (16)
- Grenada (2)
- Guadeloupe (2)
- Guatemala (3)
- Guyana (2)
- Haiti (5)
- Honduras (2)
- Hong Kong (7)
- Hungary (2)
- Iceland (3)
- India (16)
- Indonesia (4)
- Iran (14)
- Iraq (1)
- Ireland (3)
- Israel (7)
- Italy (11)
- Ivory Coast (16)
- Jamaica (2)
- Japan (11)
- Jordan (8)
- Kazakhstan (16)
- Kenya (4)
- Kiribati (1)
- Kosovo (3)
- Kyrgyzstan (2)
- Laos (2)
- Latvia (3)
- Lebanon (9)
- Lesotho (2)
- Liberia (1)
- Libya (3)
- Lithuania (4)
- Luxembourg (3)
- Macau (5)
- Macedonia (4)
- Malawi (1)
- Malaysia (4)
- Mali (8)
- Malta (1)
- Marshall Islands (1)
- Mauritania (1)
- Mauritius (1)
- Mexico (16)
- Moldova (5)
- Mongolia (5)
- Morocco (11)
- Mozambique (2)
- Myanmar (2)
- Nepal (10)
- Netherlands (3)
- New Caledonia (1)
- New Zealand (7)
- Nicaragua (2)
- Niger (6)
- Nigeria (8)
- Norway (5)
- Oman (1)
- Pakistan (4)
- Palestine (1)
- Panama (3)
- Papua New Guinea (1)
- Paraguay (4)
- Peru (7)
- Philippines (13)
- Poland (11)
- Portugal (5)
- Puerto Rico (6)
- Qatar (4)
- Romania (3)
- Russia (16)
- Rwanda (4)
- Saint Kitts and Nevis (1)
- Saint Lucia (1)
- Saint Vincent and the Grenadines (1)
- Samoa (1)
- San Marino (3)
- São Tomé and Príncipe (2)
- Saudi Arabia (5)
- Senegal (9)
- Serbia (13)
- Seychelles (1)
- Sierra Leone (1)
- Singapore (2)
- Slovakia (2)
- Slovenia (6)
- Solomon Islands (2)
- South Korea (16)
- South Sudan (2)
- Spain (16)
- Sri Lanka (2)
- Sudan (7)
- Suriname (2)
- Swaziland (3)
- Sweden (5)
- Switzerland (1)
- Syria (7)
- Tajikistan (1)
- Tanzania (1)
- Thailand (8)
- Togo (1)
- Tonga (5)
- Trinidad and Tobago (5)
- Tunisia (8)
- Turkey (16)
- Turkmenistan (6)
- Tuvalu (1)
- Uganda (7)
- Ukraine (13)
- United Arab Emirates (1)
- United States (16)
- Uruguay (2)
- Uzbekistan (11)
- Vanuatu (1)
- Venezuela (8)
- Vietnam (7)
- World Taekwondo Federation (1)
- Yemen (2)
- Zambia (1)
- Zimbabwe (3)
