= 2025 World Taekwondo Championships – Women's welterweight =

Taekwondo competitions

Women's welterweight at the 2025 World Championships
- Venue: International Expo Center
- Dates: 28 October 2025
- Competitors: 49 from 48 nations

Medalists
gold medal	Luana Márton	Hungary
silver medal	Milena Titoneli	Brazil
bronze medal	Lena Moreno	Spain
bronze medal	Elizabeth Anyanacho	Nigeria

The Women's welterweight competition at the 2025 World Taekwondo Championships was held on 28 October 2025 in Wuxi, China. Welterweights were limited to a maximum of 67 kilograms in body mass.

== Results ==
Legend

- P — Won by punitive declaration

=== Finals ===
Semifinals				Final
Lena Moreno (ESP)	3	2
Luana Márton (HUN)	6	2		Luana Márton (HUN)	8	2
Elizabeth Anyanacho (NGR)	1	8	2	Milena Titoneli (BRA)	1	1
Milena Titoneli (BRA)	6	1	3

=== Top half ===
==== Section 1 ====
Round of 64
Carla Boustany (LBN)	0	0
Alisa Pavlenko (UKR)	9^{P}	10
Tatiana Tomczak (POL)	13	13
Marrianne Max-Voy (GHA)	0	1
Maialen Irigaray (POR)	1	0
Nuray Khussainova (KAZ)	8	6
Jolanta Tarvida (LAT)	8	6
Maram Fatnassi (QAT)	2	0
Mari Romundset Nilsen (NOR)	0	6	0
Iva Petrović (SRB)	3	2	2

Round of 32
Lena Moreno (ESP)	3	8
Alisa Pavlenko (UKR)	0	0
Tatiana Tomczak (POL)	0	0
Nuray Khussainova (KAZ)	3	5
Kwak Min-ju (KOR)	6	12
Jolanta Tarvida (LAT)	2	0
Iva Petrović (SRB)	15	0	2
Leonarda Andric (CAN)	2	6	9

Round of 16
Lena Moreno (ESP)	0	8	12
Nuray Khussainova (KAZ)	1	0	0
Kwak Min-ju (KOR)	10	9
Leonarda Andric (CAN)	2	5

Quarterfinals
Lena Moreno (ESP)	4	5
Kwak Min-ju (KOR)	0	3

==== Section 2 ====
Round of 64
Nada Laaraj (MAR)	4	0
Luana Márton (HUN)	4	6
Amy Mink (NED)	14	5
Eliana Vásquez (PER)	2	2
Nefeli Ntereke Mourkousi (GRE)	2	6
Andrea Berišaj (MNE)	3	7
Nadina Mehmedović (BIH)	5	0	0
Lin Chia-hsuan (TPE)	2	4	0

Round of 32
Kristina Teachout (USA)	1	0
Luana Márton (HUN)	11	8
Amy Mink (NED)	5	13	1
Matea Jelić (CRO)	12	11	10
Iman Kanouté (MLI)	2	0
Andrea Berišaj (MNE)	3	3
Nadina Mehmedović (BIH)	0	0
Song Jie (CHN)	4	9

Round of 16
Luana Márton (HUN)	7	4
Matea Jelić (CRO)	2	3
Andrea Berišaj (MNE)	3	2	1
Song Jie (CHN)	1	9	8

Quarterfinals
Luana Márton (HUN)	0	5	6
Song Jie (CHN)	3	2	0

=== Bottom half ===
==== Section 3 ====
Round of 64
Isabelle Faber (LUX)	0	0
Klaudija Tvaronavičiūtė (LTU)	3	1
Claudia Gallardo (CHI)	2	8
Laila Delo (PHI)	0	0
Gizelle Machel (MOZ)	3	2
Nina Urganaeva (ARM)	11	7
Bạc Thị Khiêm (VIE)	0	5	7
Laura Ramírez (COL)	7	2	7

Round of 32
Elizabeth Anyanacho (NGR)	1	4	6
Klaudija Tvaronavičiūtė (LTU)	0	4	1
Claudia Gallardo (CHI)	0	7	9
Vanessa Körndl (GER)	1	1	4
Aaliyah Powell (GBR)	0	0	2
Nina Urganaeva (ARM)	0	6	5
Laura Ramírez (COL)	0	0
Ozoda Sobirjonova (UZB)	8	12

Round of 16
Elizabeth Anyanacho (NGR)	4	2	7
Claudia Gallardo (CHI)	4	0	0
Nina Urganaeva (ARM)	1	2
Ozoda Sobirjonova (UZB)	6	3

Quarterfinals
Elizabeth Anyanacho (NGR)	8	10
Ozoda Sobirjonova (UZB)	6	9

==== Section 4 ====
Round of 64
Nastaran Valizadeh (IRI)	1	2	0
Leslie Soltero (MEX)	2	0	0
Viktoriia Zheleznova (AIN)	8	7
Isabella Levestam (NZL)	0	2
Madhu Singh (IND)	0	0
Ruth Gbagbi (CIV)	6	12
Madinatou Moussa (NIG)	10	11
Rose Abela (AUS)	6	4

Round of 32
Milena Titoneli (BRA)	8	6
Leslie Soltero (MEX)	5	2
Viktoriia Zheleznova (AIN)	6	7
Inès Mehnana (FRA)	4	3
İkra Kayır (TUR)	2	7	14
Ruth Gbagbi (CIV)	4	6	6
Madinatou Moussa (NIG)	0	2
Aya Shehata (EGY)	3	7

Round of 16
Milena Titoneli (BRA)	2	2	3
Viktoriia Zheleznova (AIN)	1	8	3
İkra Kayır (TUR)	0	3
Aya Shehata (EGY)	4	5

Quarterfinals
Milena Titoneli (BRA)	2	9
Aya Shehata (EGY)	1	8
