= 2022 World Taekwondo Championships – Women's welterweight =

Taekwondo competitions

Women's welterweight at the 2022 World Championships
- Venue: Centro Acuático CODE Metropolitano
- Dates: 15 November 2022
- Competitors: 35 from 35 nations

Medalists
gold medal	Leslie Soltero	Mexico
silver medal	Aleksandra Perišić	Serbia
bronze medal	Cecilia Castro	Spain
bronze medal	Milena Titoneli	Brazil

The women's welterweight is a competition featured at the 2022 World Taekwondo Championships, and was held at the Centro Acuático CODE Metropolitano in Guadalajara, Mexico on 15 November 2022. Welterweights were limited to a maximum of 67 kilograms in body mass.

== Results ==
Legend

- DQ — Won by disqualification

=== Finals ===
Semifinals				Final
Cecilia Castro (ESP)	6	5	3
Leslie Soltero (MEX)	6	6	3	Leslie Soltero (MEX)	6	3	3
Milena Titoneli (BRA)	0	8	0	Aleksandra Perišić (SRB)	5	5	0
Aleksandra Perišić (SRB)	5	1	8

=== Top half ===
==== Section 1 ====
Round of 64
Silvana Lamanda (INA)	0	3
Lin Ting-ru (TPE)	7	3

Round of 32
Magda Wiet-Hénin (FRA)	0	13	3
Lin Ting-ru (TPE)	0	20	0
Mari Romundset Nilsen (NOR)	0	1
Athanasia Mitsopoulou (GRE)	4	2
Vanessa Körndl (GER)	5	7
Laila Delo (PHI)	0	2
Madelyn Rodríguez (DOM)	1	3
Cecilia Castro (ESP)	5	6

Round of 16
Magda Wiet-Hénin (FRA)	0	7
Athanasia Mitsopoulou (GRE)	0	2
Vanessa Körndl (GER)	0	2
Cecilia Castro (ESP)	5	4

Quarterfinals
Magda Wiet-Hénin (FRA)	0	1
Cecilia Castro (ESP)	1	9

==== Section 2 ====
Round of 64

Round of 32
Julyana Al-Sadeq (JOR)	D	Q
~~Jully Musangi (KEN)~~
Victoria Rivas (ARG)	0	0
Kim Jan-di (KOR)	5	8
Melissa Pagnotta (CAN)	1	4	7
Nuray Khussainova (KAZ)	1	3	4
Isabelle Faber (LUX)	0	0
Leslie Soltero (MEX)	12	12

Round of 16
Julyana Al-Sadeq (JOR)	0	6	3
Kim Jan-di (KOR)	4	6	0
Melissa Pagnotta (CAN)	4	1	13
Leslie Soltero (MEX)	1	9	14

Quarterfinals
Julyana Al-Sadeq (JOR)	0	3
Leslie Soltero (MEX)	2	4

=== Bottom half ===
==== Section 3 ====
Round of 64
Ozoda Sobirjonova (UZB)	D	Q
~~Hassana Boubacar (NIG)~~

Round of 32
Matea Jelić (CRO)	1	7
Ozoda Sobirjonova (UZB)	0	0
Claudia Gallardo (CHI)	D	Q
~~Elizabeth Anyanacho (NGR)~~
Zhang Mengyu (CHN)	5	9
Mervenur Erdem (TUR)	1	0
~~Nisansala Sandamali (SRI)~~
Milena Titoneli (BRA)	D	Q

Round of 16
Matea Jelić (CRO)	4	3
Claudia Gallardo (CHI)	2	0
Zhang Mengyu (CHN)	3	9	3
Milena Titoneli (BRA)	4	4	5

Quarterfinals
Matea Jelić (CRO)	3	4	4
Milena Titoneli (BRA)	3	4	4

==== Section 4 ====
Round of 64
Sofia Typou (AUS)	6	2
Kristina Teachout (USA)	20	14

Round of 32
Lauren Williams (GBR)	9	9
Zeinab Esmaeili (IRI)	1	6
Naishka Román (PUR)	0	1
Aleksandra Perišić (SRB)	2	5
Aya Shehata (EGY)	5	1
Iveta Jiránková (CZE)	1	0
Kristina Teachout (USA)	4	2
Ruth Gbagbi (CIV)	5	15

Round of 16
Lauren Williams (GBR)	3	10	5
Aleksandra Perišić (SRB)	4	2	12
Aya Shehata (EGY)	0	3	0
Ruth Gbagbi (CIV)	0	2	5

Quarterfinals
Aleksandra Perišić (SRB)	0	10	0
Ruth Gbagbi (CIV)	3	0	0
