= Haiti at the 2027 Pan American Games =

- IOC code: HAI
- NOC: Haitian Olympic Committee

in Lima, Peru 2027 – 2027
- Competitors: 18 in 1 sport
- Medals: Gold 0 Silver 0 Bronze 0 Total 0

Pan American Games appearances (overview)
- 1951; 1955; 1959; 1963; 1967; 1971; 1975; 1979; 1983; 1987; 1991; 1995; 1999; 2003; 2007; 2011; 2015; 2019; 2023; 2027

Haiti is scheduled to compete at the 2027 Pan American Games in Lima, Peru from July 23 to August 8, 2027. This will be Haiti's 19th appearance at the Pan American Games, having competed at every Games except 1963.

== Competitors ==
The following is the list of number of competitors (per gender) participating at the games per sport/discipline.

Sport	Men	Women	Total
Football	18	0	18
Total	18	0	18

== Football ==
Haiti qualified a men's team as the best Caribbean team at the 2026 CONCACAF U-20 Championship.

Summary

Key:

- A.E.T – After extra time.
- P – Match decided by penalty-shootout.

Team	Event	Group Stage				Semifinal	Final / BM	
Team	Event	Opposition Score	Opposition Score	Opposition Score	Rank	Opposition Score	Opposition Score	Rank
Haiti men's	Men's tournament							
