= 2023 World Taekwondo Championships – Women's welterweight =

Taekwondo competitions

Women's welterweight at the 2023 World Championships
- Venue: Baku Crystal Hall
- Dates: 30 May 2023
- Competitors: 48 from 46 nations

Medalists
gold medal	Magda Wiet-Hénin	France
silver medal	Julyana Al-Sadeq	Jordan
bronze medal	Mari Romundset Nilsen	Norway
bronze medal	Ruth Gbagbi	Ivory Coast

The women's welterweight is a competition featured at the 2023 World Taekwondo Championships, and was held at the Baku Crystal Hall in Baku, Azerbaijan on 30 May 2023. Welterweights were limited to a maximum of 67 kilograms in body mass.

== Results ==
=== Finals ===
Semifinals			Final
Julyana Al-Sadeq (JOR)	6	4
Mari Romundset Nilsen (NOR)	4	2	Julyana Al-Sadeq (JOR)	3	5	4
Ruth Gbagbi (CIV)	3	2	Magda Wiet-Hénin (FRA)	6	5	6
Magda Wiet-Hénin (FRA)	7	3

=== Top half ===
==== Section 1 ====
Round of 64
Safia Salih (MAR)	12	15
Isabelle Faber (LUX)	0	2
Amy Mink (NED)	5	0	3
Dayana Folleco (ECU)	4	7	2
Fanta Traoré (MLI)	4	1
Naishka Román (PUR)	9	11
Laila Delo (PHI)	15	6	12
Pauline Lolohea (TGA)	3	6	5

Round of 32
Julyana Al-Sadeq (JOR)	5	4
Safia Salih (MAR)	1	2
Amy Mink (NED)	3	0
Claudia Gallardo (CHI)	4	12
Zhang Mengyu (CHN)	3	9
Naishka Román (PUR)	2	1
Laila Delo (PHI)	0	2
Cecilia Castro (ESP)	5	3

Round of 16
Julyana Al-Sadeq (JOR)	14	2	7
Claudia Gallardo (CHI)	2	5	5
Zhang Mengyu (CHN)	4	4
Cecilia Castro (ESP)	1	0

Quarterfinals
Julyana Al-Sadeq (JOR)	7	10
Zhang Mengyu (CHN)	5	8

==== Section 2 ====
Round of 64
Ozoda Sobirjonova (UZB)	4	7
Zeinab Esmaeili (IRI)	0	5
Natalia D'Angelo (ITA)	10	13
Honestly Morete (NZL)	0	0
Trần Nguyễn Ánh Ngân (VIE)	6	15
Rebecca Murray (AUS)	5	3
Kristina Teachout (USA)	14	12
Justyna Kowalkowska (POL)	8	0

Round of 32
Milena Titoneli (BRA)	5	6	10
Ozoda Sobirjonova (UZB)	3	10	7
Natalia D'Angelo (ITA)	5	0	12
Aya Shehata (EGY)	0	1	1
Mari Romundset Nilsen (NOR)	3	9
Trần Nguyễn Ánh Ngân (VIE)	2	0
Kristina Teachout (USA)	9	7
Farida Azizova (AZE)	2	6

Round of 16
Milena Titoneli (BRA)	6	5	4
Natalia D'Angelo (ITA)	7	4	4
Mari Romundset Nilsen (NOR)	8	10	12
Kristina Teachout (USA)	9	10	10

Quarterfinals
Natalia D'Angelo (ITA)	4	2	2
Mari Romundset Nilsen (NOR)	0	2	5

=== Bottom half ===
==== Section 3 ====
Round of 64
Indira Basnet (NEP)	3	5
Maram Fatnassi (QAT)	4	5
Victoria Rivas (ARG)	1	6
Vitaliya Lazuta (AIN)	5	11
Laura Ramírez (COL)	1	1
İkra Kayır (TUR)	2	1
Margerette Maria Regi (IND)	1	3
Yulia Zaitseva (AIN)	6	8

Round of 32
Ruth Gbagbi (CIV)	10	12
Maram Fatnassi (QAT)	0	0
Vitaliya Lazuta (AIN)	14	4
Elizabeth Anyanacho (NGR)	5	1
Hong Hyo-rim (KOR)	0	2	8
İkra Kayır (TUR)	5	1	8
Yulia Zaitseva (AIN)	4	1	3
Aleksandra Perišić (SRB)	4	3	5

Round of 16
Ruth Gbagbi (CIV)	11	8
Vitaliya Lazuta (AIN)	3	0
Hong Hyo-rim (KOR)	0	4	8
Aleksandra Perišić (SRB)	1	4	1

Quarterfinals
Ruth Gbagbi (CIV)	2	2	8
Hong Hyo-rim (KOR)	1	9	2

==== Section 4 ====
Round of 64
Frida Sjöberg (SWE)	10	2	1
Doris Pole (CRO)	7	14	15
Nathalie Iliesco (CAN)	1	3	4
Chuang Hsin-hsuan (TPE)	1	1	3
Mafalda Coelho (POR)	0	0
Nuray Khussainova (KAZ)	13	12
Jasmin Andersen (DEN)	0	2
Theopoula Sarvanaki (GRE)	2	11

Round of 32
Leslie Soltero (MEX)	2	4
Doris Pole (CRO)	3	11
Nathalie Iliesco (CAN)	0	0
Lauren Williams (GBR)	5	2
Iveta Jiránková (CZE)	3	1
Nuray Khussainova (KAZ)	10	7
Theopoula Sarvanaki (GRE)	0	1
Magda Wiet-Hénin (FRA)	0	4

Round of 16
Doris Pole (CRO)	9	12
Lauren Williams (GBR)	6	8
Nuray Khussainova (KAZ)	0	0
Magda Wiet-Hénin (FRA)	8	6

Quarterfinals
Doris Pole (CRO)	2	2
Magda Wiet-Hénin (FRA)	2	11
