= Taekwondo at the 2024 Summer Olympics – Women's 67 kg =

Women's 67 kg at the Games of the XXXIII Olympiad
- Venue: Grand Palais
- Date: 9 August 2024
- Competitors: 16 from 16 nations

Medalists
1st place, gold medalist(s)		Viviana Márton	Hungary
2nd place, silver medalist(s)		Aleksandra Perišić	Serbia
3rd place, bronze medalist(s)		Kristina Teachout	United States
3rd place, bronze medalist(s)		Sarah Chaâri	Belgium

The women's 67 kg competition in Taekwondo at the 2024 Summer Olympics was held on 9 August 2024 at the Grand Palais.

== Summary ==
This is the seventh appearance of the women's heavyweight event.

2020 champion Matea Jelić and silver medalist Lauren Williams failed to qualify, one of the bronze medalists, Ruth Gbagbi lost to eventual champion Viviana Márton, later, Gbagbi got into repechages losing to Kristina Teachout, and Hedaya Wahba failed to qualify.

== Results ==
=== Gold medal match ===
Gold medal match
12	Viviana Márton (HUN)	7	4
3	Aleksandra Perišić (SRB)	1	2

=== Repechage ===
Repechage					Bronze Medal
					7	Song Jie (CHN)	1	0
					13	Kristina Teachout (USA)	9	3
13	Kristina Teachout (USA)	0	8	9	13	Kristina Teachout (USA)	9	3
5	Ruth Gbagbi (CIV)	3	5	3

Repechage					Bronze Medal
14	Ozoda Sobirjonova (UZB)	2	8	11
11	Sasikarn Tongchan (THA)	7	1	0
11	Sasikarn Tongchan (THA)	7	1	0	14	Ozoda Sobirjonova (UZB)	16	2	4
					1	Sarah Chaâri (BEL)	2	3	6

=== Main bracket ===
==== Pool A ====
Round of 16
13	Kristina Teachout (USA)	11	9
4	Magda Wiet-Hénin (FRA)	8	0
5	Ruth Gbagbi (CIV)	3	6	2
12	Viviana Márton (HUN)	6	0	3
9	Aya Shehata (EGY)	0	2	4
8	Cecilia Castro (ESP)	1	0	1
1	Sarah Chaâri (BEL)	6	11
16	Madelyn Rodríguez (DOM)	2	2

Quarter-finals
13	Kristina Teachout (USA)	8	9	10
12	Viviana Márton (HUN)	6	10	16
9	Aya Shehata (EGY)	0	0
1	Sarah Chaâri (BEL)	0	1

Semi-finals
12	Viviana Márton (HUN)	4	11
1	Sarah Chaâri (BEL)	4	10

==== Pool B ====
Round of 16
15	Lolohea Navuga Naitasi (FIJ)	0	2
2	Julyana Al-Sadeq (JOR)	12	14
7	Song Jie (CHN)	3	8
10	Elizabeth Anyanacho (NGR)	3	2
11	Sasikarn Tongchan (THA)	5	7
6	Caroline Santos (BRA)	4	6
3	Aleksandra Perišić (SRB)	0	8	2
14	Ozoda Sobirjonova (UZB)	5	4	0

Quarter-finals
2	Julyana Al-Sadeq (JOR)	0	2	1
7	Song Jie (CHN)	0	3	2
11	Sasikarn Tongchan (THA)	3	2
3	Aleksandra Perišić (SRB)	5	4

Semi-finals
7	Song Jie (CHN)	4	1
3	Aleksandra Perišić (SRB)	11	9
