= 2024 European Taekwondo Championships – Women's 67 kg =

Women's 67 kg at the 2024 European Taekwondo Championships
- Venue: Belgrade Fair – Hall 1
- Location: Belgrade, Serbia
- Dates: 11 May
- Competitors: 21 from 21 nations

Medalists
gold medal	Sarah Chaâri	Belgium
silver medal	Magda Wiet-Hénin	France
bronze medal	Aleksandra Perišić	Serbia
bronze medal	Jolanta Tarvida	Latvia

The women's 67 kg competition at the 2024 European Taekwondo Championships was held on 11 May 2024.

== Results ==
=== Finals ===
Semifinals
Magda Wiet-Hénin (FRA)	2
Jolanta Tarvida (LAT)	0
Sarah Chaâri (BEL)	2
Aleksandra Perišić (SRB)	1

Final
Magda Wiet-Hénin (FRA)	0
Sarah Chaâri (BEL)	2

=== Top half ===
==== Section 1 ====
Round of 32
Nina Urganaeva (ARM)	0
Viviana Marton (HUN)	2

Round of 16
Magda Wiet-Hénin (FRA)	2
Viviana Marton (HUN)	0
Amy Mink (NED)	0
İkra Kayır (TUR)	2

Quarterfinals
Magda Wiet-Hénin (FRA)	2
İkra Kayır (TUR)	1

==== Section 2 ====
Round of 32
Iryna Pypot (UKR)	0
Jolanta Tarvida (LAT)	2
Nadina Mehmedović (BIH)	2
Lea Karabeleska (SWE)	0

Round of 16
Vanessa Körndl (GER)	0
Jolanta Tarvida (LAT)	2
Nadina Mehmedović (BIH)	0
Cecilia Castro (ESP)	2

Quarterfinals
Jolanta Tarvida (LAT)	2
Cecilia Castro (ESP)	0

=== Bottom half ===
==== Section 3 ====
Round of 32
Sara Vital (POR)	0
Styliani Marentaki (GRE)	2

Round of 16
Sarah Chaâri (BEL)	2
Styliani Marentaki (GRE)	0
Chloe Roberts (GBR)	2
Natalia D'Angelo (ITA)	1

Quarterfinals
Sarah Chaâri (BEL)	2
Chloe Roberts (GBR)	0

==== Section 4 ====
Round of 32
Liliia Khuzina (AIN)
Chahrazed Boughrara (FIN)

Round of 16
Mari Romundset Nilsen (NOR)	1
Doris Pole (CRO)	2
Liliia Khuzina (AIN)	0
Aleksandra Perišić (SRB)	2

Quarterfinals
Doris Pole (CRO)	1
Aleksandra Perišić (SRB)	2
