= 2021 European Taekwondo Olympic Qualification Tournament =

Taekwondo competition

The 2021 European Taekwondo Olympic Qualification Tournament for the Tokyo Olympic Games took place in Sofia, Bulgaria. The tournament was held from 7 to 8 May, 2021. Each country could enter a maximum of 2 male and 2 female divisions with only one athlete in each division. The winner and runner-up athletes per division qualified for the Olympic Games under their NOC.

== Qualification summary ==
| NOC | Men | | | | Women | | | | Total |
| NOC | −58kg | −68kg | −80kg | +80kg | −49kg | −57kg | −67kg | +67kg | Total |
|---|---|---|---|---|---|---|---|---|---|
| Azerbaijan | | | | | | | X | | 1 |
| Bosnia and Herzegovina | | X | | | | | | | 1 |
| Croatia | | | | X | | | | | 1 |
| France | | | | | | | X | X | 2 |
| Greece | | | | | | X | | | 1 |
| Hungary | X | | | | | | | | 1 |
| Israel | | | | | X | | | | 1 |
| Italy | | | X | | | | | | 1 |
| Netherlands | | | | | | | | X | 1 |
| North Macedonia | | | | X | | | | | 1 |
| Norway | | | X | | | | | | 1 |
| Poland | | | | | | X | | | 1 |
| Portugal | X | | | | | | | | 1 |
| Spain | | | | | X | | | | 1 |
| Turkey | | X | | | | | | | 1 |
| Total: 15 NOCs | 2 | 2 | 2 | 2 | 2 | 2 | 2 | 2 | 16 |

== Men ==
=== −58 kg ===
7 May

Round of 16
Rui Bragança (POR) | 17
Sargis Muradyan (ARM) | 7
Elord Gjana (ALB) | 2
Frederik Emil Olsen (SWE) | 24
Tobias Hyttel (DEN) | 17
Novak Stanić (SRB) | 16
Daniel Ladzhev (BUL) | 17
Adil Belkadi (NED) | 5
Cyrian Ravet (FRA) | 29
Tom Pashcovsky (ISR) | 9
Ehsan Naghibzadeh (EOR) | 3
Niko Saarinen (FIN) | 18
Omar Salim (HUN) | 35
Amir Mohammad Hosseini (EOR) | 15
Mikheil Gavrilchenko (GEO) | 3
Stepan Dimitrov (MDA) | 10

Quarterfinals
Rui Bragança (POR) | 10
Frederik Emil Olsen (SWE) | 6
Tobias Hyttel (DEN) | 23
Daniel Ladzhev (BUL) | 24
Cyrian Ravet (FRA) | 30
Niko Saarinen (FIN) | 10
Omar Salim (HUN) | 30
Stepan Dimitrov (MDA) | 7

Semifinals
Rui Bragança (POR) | 26
Daniel Ladzhev (BUL) | 14
Cyrian Ravet (FRA) | 12
Omar Salim (HUN) | 38

3rd place
Daniel Ladzhev (BUL) | 14
Cyrian Ravet (FRA) | 38

=== −68 kg ===
8 May

Round of 32
| Levente Józsa (HUN) | 23–3 | Szabolcs Simon (ROU) |
| Abdullah Sediqi (EOR) | 11–13 | Mateusz Szczęsnowski (POL) |
| Beka Kavtaradze (GEO) | 14–4 | Filip Švec (SVK) |
| Otto Jørgensen (DEN) | 37–12 | Jan Fiala (CZE) |

Round of 16
Hakan Reçber (TUR) | PUN
Levente Józsa (HUN)
Ioannis Pilavakis (CYP) | 8
Ali Alian (SWE) | 29
Fahd Zaouia (NED) | 20
Zinedin Beqaj (MNE) | 26
Mateusz Szczęsnowski (POL) | 19
Vladimir Dalakliev (BUL) | 21
Dylan Chellamootoo (FRA) | 29
Beka Kavtaradze (GEO) | 15
Juirdo Cani (ALB) | 10
Nimrod Krivishkiy (ISR) | 31
Ali Radwan (BLR) | 1
Nedžad Husić (BIH) | 14
Otto Jørgensen (DEN) | 11
Konstantinos Chamalidis (GRE) | 13

Quarterfinals
Hakan Reçber (TUR) | PUN
Ali Alian (SWE)
Zinedin Beqaj (MNE) | 9
Vladimir Dalakliev (BUL) | 14
Dylan Chellamootoo (FRA) | 11
Nimrod Krivishkiy (ISR) | 26
Nedžad Husić (BIH) | 12
Konstantinos Chamalidis (GRE) | 4

Semifinals
Hakan Reçber (TUR) | 10
Vladimir Dalakliev (BUL) | 9
Nimrod Krivishkiy (ISR) | 7
Nedžad Husić (BIH) | 29

3rd place
Vladimir Dalakliev (BUL) | WD
Nimrod Krivishkiy (ISR)

=== −80 kg ===
7 May

Round of 32
| Alexandru Badea (ROU) | 23–7 | Edgaras Abromavičius (LTU) |

Round of 16
Richard Ordemann (NOR) | 16
Alexandru Badea (ROU) | 8
Patrik Divkovič (SLO) | 10
Aleksandar Radojkovic (AUT) | 1
Aaron Cook (MDA) | 23
Karol Robak (POL) | 18
Dávid Sajko (SVK)
Júlio Ferreira (POR) | PUN
Simone Alessio (ITA) | 10
Filip Dodevski (MKD) | 9
Denys Voronovskyi (UKR) | 10
Nicholas Corten (BEL) | 16
Tahir Güleç (GER) | 10
Kasra Mehdipournejad (EOR) | 9
David Šimek (CZE) | 28
Apostolos Telikostoglou (GRE) | 25

Quarterfinals
Richard Ordemann (NOR) | 5
Patrik Divkovič (SLO) | 0
Aaron Cook (MDA) | 7
Júlio Ferreira (POR) | 20
Simone Alessio (ITA) | 6
Nicholas Corten (BEL) | 3
Tahir Güleç (GER) | 10
David Šimek (CZE) | 6

Semifinals
Richard Ordemann (NOR) | 8
Júlio Ferreira (POR) | 5
Simone Alessio (ITA) | 21
Tahir Güleç (GER) | 2

3rd place
Júlio Ferreira (POR) | WD
Tahir Güleç (GER)

=== +80 kg ===
8 May

Round of 16
Miloš Golubović (SRB) | 43
Milos Pilipovic (NOR) | 35
Arman-Marshall Silla (BLR) | 30
Andreas Stylianou (CYP) | 0

Quarterfinals
Radik Isayev (AZE) | 20
Miloš Golubović (SRB) | 10
Dejan Georgievski (MKD) | 17
Dinko Šegedin (BIH) | 9
Ivan Šapina (CRO) | 24
Vladyslav Bondar (UKR) | 3
Arman-Marshall Silla (BLR) | 17
Emre Kutalmış Ateşli (TUR) | 25

Semifinals
Radik Isayev (AZE) | 6
Dejan Georgievski (MKD) | 13
Ivan Šapina (CRO) | 14
Emre Kutalmış Ateşli (TUR) | 13

3rd place
Radik Isayev (AZE) | 3
Emre Kutalmış Ateşli (TUR) | 7

== Women ==
=== −49 kg ===
7 May

Round of 16
Christina Schönegger (AUT) | 6
Avishag Semberg (ISR) | 18
Ela Aydin (GER) | 18
Shantelle Mendoza (DEN) | 5
Nikolet Kostova (BUL) | 8
Iryna Romoldanova (UKR) | 16
Dina Pouryounes (EOR) | 15
Vera Kapanadze (GEO) | 13
Liana Musteață (ROU) | 11
Patimat Abakarova (AZE) | 6
Adriana Cerezo (ESP) | 49
Andrea Schnell (SUI) | 4
Gabriela Briškárová (SVK) | 3
Kyriaki Kouttouki (CYP) | 4

Quarterfinals
Elizaveta Ryadninskaya (ROC) | 7
Avishag Semberg (ISR) | 21
Ela Aydin (GER) | 5
Iryna Romoldanova (UKR) | 3
Dina Pouryounes (EOR) | 0
Liana Musteață (ROU) | 1
Adriana Cerezo (ESP) | 18
Kyriaki Kouttouki (CYP) | 1

Semifinals
Avishag Semberg (ISR) | 24
Ela Aydin (GER) | 2
Liana Musteață (ROU) | 3
Adriana Cerezo (ESP) | 16

3rd place
Ela Aydin (GER) | 0
Liana Musteață (ROU) | 11

=== −57 kg ===
8 May

Round of 32
| Ilina Ivanova (BUL) | 27–23 | Rivka Bayech (ISR) |
| Teodora Mitrović (MNE) | 10–8 | Lika Toronjadze (GEO) |

Round of 16
Inese Tarvida (LAT) | 36
Ilina Ivanova (BUL) | 11
Luca Patakfalvy (HUN) | 1
Fani Tzeli (GRE) | 14
Joana Cunha (POR) | 0
Kimia Alizadeh (EOR) | 17
Iveta Jiránková (CZE) | 2
Marija Štetić (BIH) | 13
Patrycja Adamkiewicz (POL) | 16
Tatiana Țîmbalari (MDA) | 6
Paulina Armería (ITA) | 12
Despina Pilavaki (CYP) | 7
Suvi Mikkonen (FIN) | 15
Bodine Schoenmakers (NED) | 11
Teodora Mitrović (MNE) | 10
Raheleh Asemani (BEL) | 24

Quarterfinals
Inese Tarvida (LAT) | 16
Fani Tzeli (GRE) | 21
Kimia Alizadeh (EOR) | 15
Marija Štetić (BIH) | 12
Patrycja Adamkiewicz (POL) | 20
Paulina Armería (ITA) | 6
Suvi Mikkonen (FIN) | 17
Raheleh Asemani (BEL) | 14

Semifinals
Fani Tzeli (GRE) | 3
Kimia Alizadeh (EOR) | 1
Patrycja Adamkiewicz (POL) | 32
Suvi Mikkonen (FIN) | 0

3rd place
Kimia Alizadeh (EOR) | WD
Suvi Mikkonen (FIN)

=== −67 kg ===
7 May

Round of 32
| Klaudija Tvaronavičiūtė (LTU) | 3–11 | Mari Romundset Nilsen (NOR) |

Round of 16
Magda Wiet-Hénin (FRA) | 16
Mari Romundset Nilsen (NOR) | 3
Indra Craen (BEL) | 24
Elin Johansson (SWE) | 14
Athanasia Mitsopoulou (GRE) | 10
Jolanta Tarvida (LAT) | 11
Anamarija Georgievska (MKD) | 7
Rebeka Füredi (HUN) | 12
Cecilia Castro (ESP) | 35
Jenna Partanen (FIN) | 5
Jasmin Andersen (DEN) | 4
Tetiana Tetereviatnykova (UKR) | 13
Ana Ciuchitu (MDA) | 4
Petra Štolbová (CZE) | 10
Andreea Mocanu (ROU) | 2
Farida Azizova (AZE) | 8

Quarterfinals
Magda Wiet-Hénin (FRA) | 23
Indra Craen (BEL) | 4
Jolanta Tarvida (LAT) | 6
Rebeka Füredi (HUN) | 15
Cecilia Castro (ESP) | 1
Tetiana Tetereviatnykova (UKR) | 2
Petra Štolbová (CZE) | 4
Farida Azizova (AZE) | 11

Semifinals
Magda Wiet-Hénin (FRA) | 6
Rebeka Füredi (HUN) | 5
Tetiana Tetereviatnykova (UKR) | 2
Farida Azizova (AZE) | 7

3rd place
Rebeka Füredi (HUN) | 3
Tetiana Tetereviatnykova (UKR) | 9

=== +67 kg ===
8 May

| Quarterfinals | | Semifinals | | 3rd place |
| | | Lorena Brandl (GER) | 1 |
| Maristella Smiraglia (ITA) | 0 | Althéa Laurin (FRA) | 15 |
| Althéa Laurin (FRA) | 11 | | | Lorena Brandl (GER) | 7 |
| Reshmie Oogink (NED) | 5 | | | Marlene Jahl (AUT) | 0 |
| Eliza Haugen (NOR) | 4 | Reshmie Oogink (NED) | 8 |
| | | Marlene Jahl (AUT) | 5 |
