= Kristina Teachout =

American taekwondo athlete (born 2005)

Personal information
- Full name: Kristina Danielle Teachout
- Born: September 13, 2005 (age 20) Palm Bay, Florida, U.S.
- Home town: Jupiter, Florida, U.S.
- Height: 178 cm (5 ft 10 in)
- Weight: 67 kg (148 lb)

Sport
- Country: United States
- Sport: Taekwondo
- Event: –67 kg
Medal record
Women's taekwondo
Representing the United States
Olympic Games
Bronze medal – third place	2024 Paris	67 kg
Pan American Games
Bronze medal – third place	2023 Santiago	67 kg

Kristina Danielle Teachout (born September 13, 2005) is an American taekwondo athlete. She represented the United States at the 2024 Summer Olympics and won a bronze medal in the 67 kg category.

== Career ==
Teachout made her senior international debut for the United States in November 2022 in the women's welterweight event at the 2022 World Taekwondo Championships held in Guadalajara, Mexico.

In June 2023, she competed in the women's welterweight event at the 2023 World Taekwondo Championships held in Baku, Azerbaijan. In October 2023, she competed at the 2023 Pan American Games and won a bronze medal in the 67 kg event. She won gold in the 2023 World Taekwondo Grand Prix challenge, Costa Rica Open and Dominican Open and silver at the Spanish Open and Pan Am Series.

In January 2024, she competed at the U.S. Olympic Trials and defeated the 2020 Summer Olympics 57 kg champion Anastasija Zolotic to advance to the 2024 Pan American Taekwondo Olympic Qualification Tournament. In April 2024, during the Olympic Qualification Tournament, she won her semifinal match and qualified to represent the United States at the 2024 Summer Olympics. At 18 years old, she was Team USA's youngest Olympian in taekwondo.

At the 2024 Summer Olympics In Paris, she competed in the 67 kg category and defeated Magda Wiet-Hénin in the round of 16, but lost to eventual gold medal winner Viviana Márton in the quarterfinals. Teachout then defeated Ruth Gbagbi in the repechage match, and advanced to the bronze medal contest where she faced Song Jie. She defeated Song and won a bronze medal.

In August 2025, she competed at the World Taekwondo Grand Prix Challenge at the Muju Taekwondowon and won a gold medal in the 67 kg category, defeating Ozoda Sobirjonova in the finals. In October 2025, she competed at the 2025 World Taekwondo Championships in the 67 kg category, and lost to Luana Márton in the round of 32.
