= 2025 World Taekwondo Championships – Women's featherweight =

Taekwondo competitions

Women's featherweight at the 2025 World Championships
- Venue: Taihu International Expo Center
- Dates: 24 October 2025
- Competitors: 54 from 51 nations

Medalists
gold medal	Maria Clara Pacheco	Brazil
silver medal	Kim Yu-jin	South Korea
bronze medal	Luo Zongshi	China
bronze medal	Fadia Khirfan	Jordan

The Women's featherweight competition at the 2025 World Taekwondo Championships was held on 24 October 2025 in Wuxi, China. Featherweights were limited to a maximum of 57 kilograms in body mass.

== Results ==
Legend

- DQ — Won by disqualification
- P — Won by punitive declaration

=== Finals ===
Semifinals			Final
Maria Clara Pacheco (BRA)	4	10
Luo Zongshi (CHN)	1	2	Maria Clara Pacheco (BRA)	2	12
Fadia Khirfan (JOR)	0	3	Kim Yu-jin (KOR)	2	10
Kim Yu-jin (KOR)	16	9

=== Top half ===
==== Section 1 ====
Round of 64
Leonor Correia (POR)	9	3	8
So Yuen Ting (HKG)	2	4	1
Stacey Hymer (AUS)	2	4	4
Ruqia Rahmani (FIN)	0	8	0
Gerda Meištininkaitė (LTU)	1	0
Laura Rodríguez (ESP)	4	3
Markella Teggeri (CYP)	0	1
Darya Kostenevych (UKR)	8	1
Merieme Khoulal (MAR)	14	18
Ndeye Maty Sarr (SEN)	2	5

Round of 32
Maria Clara Pacheco (BRA)	13	13
Leonor Correia (POR)	0	0
Stacey Hymer (AUS)	0	2
Laura Rodríguez (ESP)	7	4
Nahid Kiani (IRI)	4	7	12
Darya Kostenevych (UKR)	5	4	2
Merieme Khoulal (MAR)	2	2
Faith Dillon (USA)	9	4

Round of 16
Maria Clara Pacheco (BRA)	5	10	5
Laura Rodríguez (ESP)	5	5	3
Nahid Kiani (IRI)	1	2
Faith Dillon (USA)	5	4

Quarterfinals
Maria Clara Pacheco (BRA)	8	8
Faith Dillon (USA)	4	6

==== Section 2 ====
Round of 64
Kaja Husby Hansen (NOR)	4	0
Fani Tzeli (GRE)	9	12
Dominika Hronová (CZE)	5	3
Silvana Lamanda (INA)	9	7
Andrialis Bonilla (DOM)	2	2
Giada Al-Halwani (ITA)	4	3
Hatice Kübra İlgün (TUR)	15	13
Lolohea Navuga Naitasi (FIJ)	2	0
Czarina Danganan (PHI)	0	4	5
Mao Nishida (JPN)	8	3	7
Aida Khorshidi (TRT)	0	4
Tamara Robles (CUB)	0	3

Round of 32
Skylar Park (CAN)	3	3
Fani Tzeli (GRE)	10	6
Silvana Lamanda (INA)	2	3
Giada Al-Halwani (ITA)	4	4
Hatice Kübra İlgün (TUR)	10	12
Mao Nishida (JPN)	4	0
Aida Khorshidi (TRT)	0	3
Luo Zongshi (CHN)	1	9

Round of 16
Fani Tzeli (GRE)	6	4	7
Giada Al-Halwani (ITA)	7	3	0
Hatice Kübra İlgün (TUR)	2	4
Luo Zongshi (CHN)	7	7

Quarterfinals
Fani Tzeli (GRE)	2	3
Luo Zongshi (CHN)	6	4

=== Bottom half ===
==== Section 3 ====
Round of 64
Džejna Hamzić (BIH)	3	0
Aranaya Thakur (IND)	5	12
Laetitia Aoun (LBN)	7	13
Adam Ilona (COM)	0	1
~~Nana Oumarou (NIG)~~
Margarita Blizniakova (AIN)	D	Q
Madina Mirabzalova (UZB)	3	0
Ingibjörg Grétarsdóttir (ISL)	1	0
Rona Gashi (KOS)	2	0
Teigan Smith (GBR)	5	7^{P}
Fadia Khirfan (JOR)	7	15
Alexmar Sulbarán (VEN)	0	6

Round of 32
Kanélya Carabin (FRA)	10	5
Aranaya Thakur (IND)	6	5
Laetitia Aoun (LBN)	4	2
Margarita Blizniakova (AIN)	9	7
Madina Mirabzalova (UZB)	6	9	7
Teigan Smith (GBR)	0	11	0
Fadia Khirfan (JOR)	2	4	0
Lin Wei-chun (TPE)	5	2	0

Round of 16
Kanélya Carabin (FRA)	3	0	12
Margarita Blizniakova (AIN)	4	0	8
Madina Mirabzalova (UZB)	2	5
Fadia Khirfan (JOR)	3	11

Quarterfinals
Kanélya Carabin (FRA)	4	3
Fadia Khirfan (JOR)	7	12

==== Section 4 ====
Round of 64
Julie Mam (CAM)	2	0
Anastasia Rovithis (GER)	3	4
Nikol Lisowska (POL)	6	8
Phannapa Harnsujin (THA)	0	3
Mariya Sevostyanova (KAZ)	15	14
Coumba Magassa (GAB)	2	3
Pheline Rosin (NZL)	0	6
Luca Patakfalvy (HUN)	12	10
Zaira Salgado (MEX)	3	8	4
Trần Thị Ánh Tuyết (VIE)	6	0	14

Round of 32
Yuliya Vitko (AIN)	14	9
Anastasia Rovithis (GER)	12	5
Nikol Lisowska (POL)	2	5
Nika Karabatić (CRO)	11	11
Mariya Sevostyanova (KAZ)	0	7	7
Luca Patakfalvy (HUN)	4	2	0
Trần Thị Ánh Tuyết (VIE)	1	3
Kim Yu-jin (KOR)	5	10

Round of 16
Yuliya Vitko (AIN)	7	0	1
Nika Karabatić (CRO)	1	12	9
Mariya Sevostyanova (KAZ)	2	0
Kim Yu-jin (KOR)	10	12

Quarterfinals
Nika Karabatić (CRO)	2	3
Kim Yu-jin (KOR)	8	13
