= Taekwondo at the 2023 European Games – Women's 67 kg =

Taekwondo competition

Women's 67 kg at the 2023 European Games
- Venue: Krynica-Zdrój Arena
- Date: 25 June
- Competitors: 16 from 16 nations

Medalists
gold medal	Aleksandra Perišić	Serbia
silver medal	Cecilia Castro	Spain
bronze medal	Natalia D'Angelo	Italy
bronze medal	Magda Wiet-Hénin	France

The women's 67 kg competition in taekwondo at the 2023 European Games took place on 25 June at the Krynica-Zdrój Arena.

== Schedule ==
All times are Central European Summer Time (UTC+2).

Date	Time	Event
Sunday, 25 June 2023	09:12	Round of 16
Sunday, 25 June 2023	14:00	Quarterfinals
Sunday, 25 June 2023	15:36	Semifinals
Sunday, 25 June 2023	16:24	Repechage
Sunday, 25 June 2023	19:00	Bronze medal bouts
Sunday, 25 June 2023	20:24	Final

== Results ==
Round of 16
Magda Wiet-Hénin (FRA)	12	15
Viviana Márton (HUN)	11	1
Farida Azizova (AZE)	2	1	1
Athanasia Mitsopoulou (GRE)	1	2	6
Cecilia Castro (ESP)	11	17
Amy Mink (NED)	7	5
Natalia D'Angelo (ITA)	4	11
Justyna Kowalkowska (POL)	0	2
Matea Jelić (CRO)	5	6
İkra Kayır (TUR)	0	2
Chloe Roberts (GBR)	10	10	5
Vanessa Körndl (GER)	6	12	13
Mari Romundset Nilsen (NOR)	4	3	1
Iveta Jiránková (CZE)	3	5	5
Isabelle Faber (LUX)	5	1
Aleksandra Perišić (SRB)	8	3

Quarterfinals
Magda Wiet-Hénin (FRA)	4	7
Athanasia Mitsopoulou (GRE)	2	5
Cecilia Castro (ESP)	1	5	8
Natalia D'Angelo (ITA)	5	1	1
Matea Jelić (CRO)	3	7	15
Vanessa Körndl (GER)	6	0	3
Iveta Jiránková (CZE)	0	3
Aleksandra Perišić (SRB)	5	5

Semifinals
Magda Wiet-Hénin (FRA)	0	7
Cecilia Castro (ESP)	2	8
Matea Jelić (CRO)	7	2	5
Aleksandra Perišić (SRB)	4	4	8

Final
Cecilia Castro (ESP)	1	0
Aleksandra Perišić (SRB)	7	4

=== Repechage ===
Repechage				Bronze medal bout
				Matea Jelić (CRO)	8	2	7
Natalia D'Angelo (ITA)	7	5	14	Natalia D'Angelo (ITA)	3	4	8
Amy Mink (NED)	3	9	3
Isabelle Faber (LUX)	1	4
Iveta Jiránková (CZE)	2	7		Iveta Jiránková (CZE)	1	7
				Magda Wiet-Hénin (FRA)	4	9
