= Taekwondo at the 2026 Asian Games – Women's 57 kg =

Taekwondo competition

Women's 57 kg at the 2026 Asian Games
- Venue: Toyohashi City General Gymnasium
- Date: 3 October 2026
- Competitors: 15 from 15 nations

Medalists
gold medal	Fadia Khirfan	Jordan
silver medal	Zhang Chuling	China
bronze medal	Lin Wei-chun	Chinese Taipei
bronze medal	Natkamon Wassana	Thailand

The women's 57 kilograms event at the 2026 Asian Games took place on 3 October 2026 at Toyohashi City General Gymnasium, Toyohashi, Japan.

Each bout consisted of up to three rounds, lasting two minutes apiece. The athlete who scored more points in each round was the winner of that round; the bout finished when one athlete had won two rounds (and thus the match).

Fadia Khirfan from Jordan won the gold medal.

== Schedule ==
All times are Japan Standard Time (UTC+09:00)

Date	Time	Event
Saturday, 3 October 2026	09:00	Round of 16
Saturday, 3 October 2026	09:00	Quarterfinals
Saturday, 3 October 2026	14:30	Semifinals
Saturday, 3 October 2026	14:30	Gold medal contest

== Results ==
Round of 16
Laetitia Aoun (LBN)	8	12
Manami Shinkawa (JPN)	0	10
Madina Mirabzalova (UZB)	4	0	3
Natkamon Wassana (THA)	3	12	13
Jessica Canabal (PHI)	0	7	12
Julie Mam (CAM)	4	6	9
Kashish Malik (IND)	3	2
Kim Yu-jin (KOR)	18	17
Zhang Chuling (CHN)	11	11
Annsofna Cacildes (SRI)	0	2
Togzhan Kaznabek (KAZ)	4	3
Nahid Kiani (IRI)	6	8
Lin Wei-chun (TPE)	5	11
Battserengiin Mönkhjin (MGL)	3	0

Quarterfinals
Laetitia Aoun (LBN)	3	4	2
Natkamon Wassana (THA)	12	3	5
Jessica Canabal (PHI)	2	2
Fadia Khirfan (JOR)	16	4
Kim Yu-jin (KOR)	5	8
Zhang Chuling (CHN)	9	14
Nahid Kiani (IRI)	5	9	2
Lin Wei-chun (TPE)	12	9	6

Semifinals
Natkamon Wassana (THA)	2	8
Fadia Khirfan (JOR)	2	9
Zhang Chuling (CHN)	2	6	6
Lin Wei-chun (TPE)	0	8	2

Gold medal contest
Fadia Khirfan (JOR)	2	2	6
Zhang Chuling (CHN)	0	4	3
