= Weightlifting at the 2011 Pan American Games – Qualification =

The top eighteen teams with the combined scores at the 2009 and 2010 Pan American Championship would qualify athletes, with the teams finishing higher, qualifying more athletes. Mexico as hosts enters a full team for each gender. Each nation may only enter a maximum of two athletes per weight category.

== Qualification timeline ==
| Event | Date | Venue |
|---|---|---|
| 2009 Pan American Championship | June 3 to May 8, 2011 | (United States) Chicago |
| 2010 Pan American Championship | May 23 to May 31, 2011 | Guatemala City |

== Summary ==
| NOC | Men | Women | Total athletes |
|---|---|---|---|
| Argentina | 2 | 2 | 4 |
| Brazil | 2 | 2 | 4 |
| Canada | 2 | 1 | 3 |
| Chile | | 3 | 3 |
| Colombia | 7 | 6 | 13 |
| Costa Rica | 1 | | 1 |
| Cuba | 7 | 2 | 9 |
| Dominican Republic | 5 | 6 | 11 |
| Ecuador | 6 | 5 | 11 |
| El Salvador | 2 | 1 | 3 |
| Guatemala | 4 | 2 | 6 |
| Haiti | 1 | | 1 |
| Honduras | 1 | 1 | 2 |
| Mexico | 7 | 6 | 13 |
| Nicaragua | 1 | 1 | 2 |
| Panama | 1 | | 1 |
| Peru | 1 | 2 | 3 |
| Puerto Rico | 4 | 6 | 10 |
| United States | 6 | 5 | 11 |
| Uruguay | 1 | | 1 |
| Venezuela | 7 | 5 | 12 |
| Total athletes | 68 | 56 | 124 |
| Total NOCs | 19 | 17 | 21 |

== Men ==
| Event | Athlete(s) per NOC | Total Athletes | Qualified |
|---|---|---|---|
| Host Nation | 7 | 7 | Mexico |
| Nations ranked 1-3 | 7 | 21 | Cuba; Colombia; Venezuela |
| Nations ranked 4-6 | 6 | 18 | Ecuador; United States; Dominican Republic* |
| Nations ranked 7-8 | 4 | 8 | Guatemala; Puerto Rico |
| Nations ranked 9-12 | 2 | 8 | Argentina; Brazil; El Salvador; Canada |
| Nations ranked 13-18 | 1 | 6 | ~~Chile~~; Panama; Haiti; Nicaragua; Honduras; Uruguay |
| Wild card/Unused quotas | 1 | 1 | Costa Rica; Peru* |
| TOTAL | | 69 | |

- Dominican Republic declined one quota.
  - Chile withdrawn due to drug failure

== Women ==
| Event | Athlete(s) per NOC | Total Athletes | Qualified |
|---|---|---|---|
| Host Nation | 6 | 6 | Mexico |
| Nations ranked 1-3 | 6 | 18 | Colombia; Puerto Rico; Dominican Republic |
| Nations ranked 4-6 | 5 | 15 | Ecuador; Venezuela; United States |
| Nations ranked 7-10 | 2 | 8 | Chile; Guatemala; Argentina; Brazil; Honduras*** |
| Nations ranked 11-18 | 1 | 8 | Nicaragua; El Salvador; Peru; Canada; Cuba; ~~Aruba~~; ~~Barbados~~ |
| Wild card/Unused quotas | 1 | 1 | Chile; Cuba; Peru |
| TOTAL | | 56 | |

- Aruba had originally qualified a team of one female athlete, however that athlete (Jennifer Pifter) tested positive for drugs and was suspended. The athlete was replaced by an athlete from Honduras.
