= Haiti at the 2023 Pan American Games =

- IOC code: HAI
- NOC: Haitian Olympic Committee

in Santiago, Chile 20 October 2023 – 5 November 2023
- Competitors: 14 in 7 sports
- Flag bearers (opening): Jackson Darrius & Aliyah Shipman
- Flag bearers (closing): Kervens Bouche & Jennifer Etienne
- Medals Ranked =25th: Gold 0 Silver 1 Bronze 2 Total 3

Pan American Games appearances (overview)
- 1951; 1955; 1959; 1963; 1967; 1971; 1975; 1979; 1983; 1987; 1991; 1995; 1999; 2003; 2007; 2011; 2015; 2019; 2023

Haiti competed at the 2023 Pan American Games in Santiago, Chile from October 20 to November 5, 2023. This was Haiti's 18th appearance at the Pan American Games, having competed at every edition of the Games except 1963.

The Haitian delegation consisted of 14 athletes competing in seven sports. Boxer Jackson Darrius and taekwondo athlete Aliyah Shipman were the country's flagbearers during the opening ceremony. Meanwhile, boxer Kervens Bouche and judoka Jennifer Etienne were the country's flagbearers during the closing ceremony.

Haiti earned its best ever performance in the sport of taekwondo (a silver medal), when Ava Soon Lee won the silver medal in the women's 67 kg event. The medal was the first for the country since 2007. Overall, Haiti won three medals, one silver and two bronze, matching its best performance (tied with 2003). This placed the country in a tie for 25th in the medal table (along with Bahamas and Guyana).

== Medalists ==
The following Haitian competitors won medals at the games. In the by discipline sections below, medalists' names are bolded.

Medal	Name	Sport	Event	Date
Silver	Ava Soon Lee	Taekwondo	Women's 67 kg	October 22
Bronze	Aliyah Shipman	Taekwondo	Women's +67 kg	October 23
Bronze	Cédrick Belony-Dulièpre	Boxing	Men's 80 kg	October 26

== Competitors ==
The following is the list of number of competitors (per gender) participating at the games per sport/discipline.

Sport	Men	Women	Total
Badminton	0	1	1
Basketball	4	0	4
Boxing	3	1	4
Gymnastics	0	1	1
Judo	0	1	1
Taekwondo	0	2	2
Tennis	0	1	1
Total	7	7	14

== Badminton ==
Haiti qualified one female athlete. This will mark the country's sport debut at the Pan American Games.

Women

Athlete	Event	First round	Second round	Quarterfinals	Semifinals	Final	Rank
Athlete	Event	Opposition Result	Opposition Result	Opposition Result	Opposition Result	Opposition Result	Rank
Neila Jean	Singles	Diaz (CHI); **L** 0–2 (3–21, 0–21)	Did not advance				

== Basketball ==
=== 3x3 ===
Summary

Team	Event	Group stage			Quarterfinal	Semifinal	Final / BM / Pl.	
Team	Event	Opposition Result	Opposition Result	Rank	Opposition Result	Opposition Result	Opposition Result	Rank
Haiti men	Men's tournament	Venezuela; **L** 16–21	Brazil; **L** 7–21	3	Did not advance			

==== Men's tournament ====
Haiti qualified a male 3x3 team, consisting of four athletes.

Roster

- Kervenson Blanc
- Ravix Cine
- Max Macon
- Fitz Salvant

Preliminary round

Pos	Team	Pld	W	L	PF	PA	PD	Qualification
1	Brazil	2	**2**	0	41	26	+15	Quarterfinals
2	Venezuela	2	**1**	1	40	36	+4	Quarterfinals
3	Haiti	2	**0**	2	23	42	−19	

Source: Report
Rules for classification: 1) Wins; 2) Head-to-head record; 3) Points scored.

21 October 2023
15:00

Report

**Venezuela**	**21**–16	Haiti
Pts: Palacios 9		Pts: Macon 5

Estadio Español
Referees: Marie Houle (CAN) / Lautaro Ojeda (ARG)

21 October 2023
19:00

Report

**Brazil**	**21**–7	Haiti
Pts: Branquinho 12		Pts: Salvant 4

Estadio Español
Referees: Jorge Garcia (DOM) / Lautaro Ojeda (ARG)

== Boxing ==
Haiti entered 4 boxers (three men and one woman).

Men

Athlete	Event	Round of 32	Round of 16	Quarterfinal	Semifinal	Final	
Athlete	Event	Opposition Result	Opposition Result	Opposition Result	Opposition Result	Opposition Result	Rank
Kervens Bouche	–63.5 kg	Viáfara (COL); **L** RSC R2	Did not advance				
Darrius Jackson	–71 kg	—N/a	Palacio (VEN); **L** 0–5	Did not advance			
**Cédrick Belony-Dulièpre**	–80 kg	—N/a	Eccleston (JAM); **W** 5–0	Cox (BAR); **W** 4–1	Pereira (BRA); **L** 0–5	Did not advance	3rd place, bronze medalist(s)

Women

Athlete	Event	Round of 16	Quarterfinal	Semifinal	Final	
Athlete	Event	Opposition Result	Opposition Result	Opposition Result	Opposition Result	Rank
Kathreen Sterling	–50 kg	Almeida (BRA); **L** 0–5	Did not advance			

== Gymnastics ==
=== Artistic ===
Haiti qualified one female artistic gymnast at the 2023 Pan American Championships. This marked the country's debut in the sport at the Pan American Games. Lynnzee Brown is an American born gymnast who chose to represent her father's country of birth in international competition. Brown would go on to finish 13th in the individual all-around final.

Women

Athlete	Event	Qualification				Total	Rank
Athlete	Event	V	UB	BB	F	Total	Rank
Lynnzee Brown	Individual all-around	13.400	11.066	11.300	11.866	47.632	14 **Q**

Qualification Legend: Q = Qualified to apparatus final

Individual Final

Athlete	Event	Apparatus				Total	Rank
Athlete	Event	F	V	UB	BB	Total	Rank
Lynnzee Brown	All-around	13.400	11.000	11.533	12.200	48.133	13

== Judo ==
Haiti qualified one female judoka.

Women

Athlete	Event	Round of 16	Quarterfinals	Semifinals	Repechage	Final / BM	
Athlete	Event	Opposition Result	Opposition Result	Opposition Result	Opposition Result	Opposition Result	Rank
Jennifer Etienne	−52 kg	Echevarría (PUR); **L** 00–10	Did not advance				

== Taekwondo ==
Haiti qualified two female athletes during the Pan American Games Qualification Tournament. Both athletes would end up winning medals, with Ava Soon Lee getting the country's best ever result (a silver) in the sport.

Kyorugi

Women

Athlete	Event	Round of 16	Quarterfinals	Semifinals	Repechage	Final/ BM	
Athlete	Event	Opposition Result	Opposition Result	Opposition Result	Opposition Result	Opposition Result	Rank
**Ava Soon Lee**	–67 kg	Molina (HON); **W** 2–0	Gallardo (CHI); **W** 1–1	Santos (BRA); **W** 2–1	Bye	Soltero (MEX); **L** 0–2	2nd place, silver medalist(s)
**Aliyah Shipman**	+67 kg	Martínez (CUB); **W** 2–0	Siqueira (BRA); **W** 2–0	Mosquera (COL); **L** 0–2	—N/a	Bronze medal final Mina (ECU); **W** 2–1	3rd place, bronze medalist(s)

== Tennis ==
Haiti qualified one female tennis athlete. Love-Star Alexis represented the country and lost her first match against Taly Licht of Uruguay.

Women

Athlete	Event	Round of 64	Round of 32	Round of 16	Quarterfinals	Semifinals	Final / BM	
Athlete	Event	Opposition Score	Opposition Score	Opposition Score	Opposition Score	Opposition Score	Opposition Score	Rank
Love-Star Alexis	Singles	Licht (URU); **L** 1–2 (6–0, 2–6, 3–6)	Did not advance					

== See also ==
- Haiti at the 2023 Parapan American Games
- Haiti at the 2024 Summer Olympics
