= 2023 World Taekwondo Championships – Women's featherweight =

Taekwondo competitions

Women's featherweight at the 2023 World Championships
- Venue: Baku Crystal Hall
- Dates: 29 May 2023
- Competitors: 50 from 47 nations

Medalists
gold medal	Luana Márton	Hungary
silver medal	Lo Chia-ling	Chinese Taipei
bronze medal	Maria Clara Pacheco	Brazil
bronze medal	Hatice Kübra İlgün	Turkey

The women's featherweight is a competition featured at the 2023 World Taekwondo Championships, and was held at the Baku Crystal Hall in Baku, Azerbaijan on 29 May 2023. Featherweights were limited to a maximum of 57 kilograms in body mass.

== Results ==
Legend

- P — Won by punitive declaration
- W — Won by withdrawal

=== Finals ===
Semifinals				Final
Luana Márton (HUN)	4	6
Maria Clara Pacheco (BRA)	2	2		Luana Márton (HUN)	2	4
Lo Chia-ling (TPE)	4	7	16	Lo Chia-ling (TPE)	1	3
Hatice Kübra İlgün (TUR)	9	1	3

=== Top half ===
==== Section 1 ====
Round of 64
Trần Thị Ánh Tuyết (VIE)	1	7	5
Margarita Blizniakova (AIN)	4	0	5
Klaudija Tvaronavičiūtė (LTU)	1	4
Maïmouna Konaté (MLI)	1	3
Alesia Patratii (KGZ)	2	1
Lee Han-na (KOR)	6	12
Valeryia Smychkova (AIN)	2	4
Ela Marić (SRB)	1	0
Luana Márton (HUN)	12	7^{P}
Emma Cahill (IRL)	0	0

Round of 32
Luo Zongshi (CHN)	6	10
Trần Thị Ánh Tuyết (VIE)	0	2
Klaudija Tvaronavičiūtė (LTU)	0	6
Lee Han-na (KOR)	5	9
Faidra Kalteki (GRE)	2	2
Valeryia Smychkova (AIN)	0	1
Luana Márton (HUN)	4	12	7
Raheleh Asemani (BEL)	4	7	0

Round of 16
Luo Zongshi (CHN)	3
Lee Han-na (KOR)	0	W
Faidra Kalteki (GRE)	2	3
Luana Márton (HUN)	5	4

Quarterfinals
Lee Han-na (KOR)	5	7	9
Luana Márton (HUN)	12	5	9

==== Section 2 ====
Round of 64
Madina Mirabzalova (UZB)	10	13
Tina Modanloo (IRI)	5	0
Inese Tarvida (LAT)	10	14
Nicole McCann (PHI)	3	3
Hana Flegrová (CZE)	4	5
Mariya Sevostyanova (KAZ)	8	5
Sonam Rawal (IND)	8	7
Marie Egagne (CMR)	7	6

Round of 32
Nada Laaraj (MAR)	4	3
Madina Mirabzalova (UZB)	4	8
Inese Tarvida (LAT)	5	0
Giada Al-Halwani (ITA)	6	4
Maria Clara Pacheco (BRA)	1	7
Mariya Sevostyanova (KAZ)	1	7
Sonam Rawal (IND)	2	3
Skylar Park (CAN)	9	7

Round of 16
Madina Mirabzalova (UZB)	6	2	13
Giada Al-Halwani (ITA)	2	7	1
Maria Clara Pacheco (BRA)	4	6
Skylar Park (CAN)	2	4

Quarterfinals
Madina Mirabzalova (UZB)	0	0
Maria Clara Pacheco (BRA)	7	12

=== Bottom half ===
==== Section 3 ====
Round of 64
Caitlyn Cox (USA)	9	15
Regina Jiménez (MEX)	7	2
Nishy Lee Lindo (CRC)	3	8	5
Anna Engström (SWE)	3	3	0
Jathmarilys Sellas (PUR)	2	0
Petra Ždero (BIH)	11	8
Daniela Muñoz (COL)	5	1^{W}
Angel Sitapa (TGA)	0	0

Round of 32
Jade Jones (GBR)	12	7
Caitlyn Cox (USA)	2	0
Nishy Lee Lindo (CRC)	3	5
Melanie Kindl (AUT)	0	5
Laetitia Aoun (LBN)	9	10
Petra Ždero (BIH)	1	1
Daniela Muñoz (COL)	0	1
Lo Chia-ling (TPE)	0	8

Round of 16
Jade Jones (GBR)	4	7
Nishy Lee Lindo (CRC)	0	0
Laetitia Aoun (LBN)	2	4	5
Lo Chia-ling (TPE)	5	3	7

Quarterfinals
Jade Jones (GBR)	0	1
Lo Chia-ling (TPE)	8	2

==== Section 4 ====
Round of 64
Mary Muriu (KEN)	1	1
Joana Cunha (POR)	6	3
Camila Cáceres (PER)	9	7
Gabriela Coman (ROU)	13	10
Stacey Hymer (AUS)	11	13
Carla Tito (ECU)	0	2
Marzieh Hamidi (RTA)	0	0
Arlet Ortiz (ESP)	5	12
Helmi Härkönen (FIN)	1	5
Nadine Mahmoud (EGY)	13	12

Round of 32
Patrycja Adamkiewicz (POL)	3	7
Joana Cunha (POR)	0	0
Gabriela Coman (ROU)	0	2
Bodine Schoenmakers (NED)	0	5
Stacey Hymer (AUS)	0	5
Arlet Ortiz (ESP)	0	6
Nadine Mahmoud (EGY)	2	1
Hatice Kübra İlgün (TUR)	6	13

Round of 16
Patrycja Adamkiewicz (POL)	6	9
Bodine Schoenmakers (NED)	0	8
Arlet Ortiz (ESP)	4	7	5
Hatice Kübra İlgün (TUR)	8	6	5

Quarterfinals
Patrycja Adamkiewicz (POL)	5	7	7
Hatice Kübra İlgün (TUR)	7	5	8
