= Fadia Khirfan =

Jordanian Taekwondo practitioner (born 2007)

Personal information
- Nationality: Jordanian
- Born: 7 September 2007 (age 19)

Sport
- Sport: Taekwondo
- Weight class: 57 kg
Medal record
Representing Jordan
World Championships
Bronze medal – third place	2025 Wuxi	57 kg
Asian Games
Gold medal – first place	2026 Aichi-Nagoya	57 kg
World U21 Championships
Bronze medal – third place	2025 Nairobi	57 kg

Fadia Khirfan (born 7 September 2007) is a Jordanian taekwondo athlete who competes in the 57 kg category. She is a bronze medalist at the World Championships and gold medalist at the Asian Games.

== Career ==
Khirfan competed in the women's featherweight event at the 2025 World Taekwondo Championships held in Wuxi, China. She reached the semifinals where she was defeated by Kim Yu-jin, winning a bronze medal. She then competed at the World U21 Championships held in Nairobi, where she won a bronze medal.

Khirfan competed in the 57 kg event at the 2026 Asian Games held in Toyohashi, Aichi, Japan, where she won the gold medal by defeating Zhang Chuling in the final.
