= Styliani Marentaki =

Greek taekwondo practitioner

Personal information
- Born: 20 December 2006 (age 19)

Sport
- Country: Greece
- Sport: Taekwondo
Medal record
Women's taekwondo
Representing Greece
European Championships
Gold medal – first place	2026 Munich	67 kg
World U21 Championships
Bronze medal – third place	2025 Nairobi	67 kg
European U21 Championships
Gold medal – first place	2025 Pristina	67 kg
Gold medal – first place	2024 Sarajevo	67 kg
Mediterranean Games
Bronze medal – third place	2026 Taranto	67 kg

Styliani Marentaki is Greek taekwondo practitioner. She was a gold medalist at the European Taekwondo Championships.

== Career ==
Marentaki won the gold medal in the -67 category at the 2024 European U21 Taekwondo Championships in Sarajevo, winning the tournament without dropping a round and defeating Lena Moreno of Spain in the final.

In December 2025, she was a bronze medalist at the 2025 World U21 Taekwondo Championships in Nairobi, Kenya. Later that month, she retained her title to win the gold medal in the women's -67 kg at the 2025 European U21 Taekwondo Championships in Pristina, Kosovo.

In May 2026, she defeated Luana Marton of Hungary to win the gold medal at the 2026 European Taekwondo Championships in Germany. On her way to the final, she also defeated Olympic silver medalist Aleksandra Perisic of Serbia 2–0.
