= 2024 Pan American Taekwondo Olympic Qualification Tournament =

Taekwondo competition

The 2024 Pan American Qualification Tournament for Paris Olympic Games was held in Santo Domingo, Dominican Republic on 9 and 10 April 2024. Each country could enter a maximum of 2 male and 2 female divisions with only one athlete in each division, as long as it had no athlete already qualified through ranking. The two finalists from each division qualifies for the Olympic Games under their National Olympic Committee.

== Qualification summary ==
NOC	Men				Women				Total
NOC	−58kg	−68kg	−80kg	+80kg	−49kg	−57kg	−67kg	+67kg	Total
Argentina	X								1
Brazil		X	X			X			3
Canada					X				1
Chile			X					X	2
Cuba				X				X	2
Dominican Republic		X					X		2
United States				X		X	X		3
Uruguay					X				1
Venezuela	X								1
Total: 9 NOCs	2	2	2	2	2	2	2	2	16

== Men ==
=== −58 kg ===
10 April

Round of 16
Joshua Klaber (ARU)	1	0
Jhon Garrido (COL)	3	4
David Fuentes (GUA)	12	5
Fabio Rojas (BOL)	0	3
Sidney Bennie (TTO)	1	0
Yohandri Granado (VEN)	14	11
Camilo López (ESA)	1	2
José Santiago (PUR)	4	11
Raymiguel Barreto (PER)	3	10
Gregory Jean-Baptiste (HAI)	1	2

Quarterfinals
Brandon Plaza (MEX)	4	4
Jhon Garrido (COL)	5	5
David Fuentes (GUA)	0	1
Yohandri Granado (VEN)	2	14
Braven Park (CAN)	5	7	17
José Santiago (PUR)	2	9	8
Raymiguel Barreto (PER)	2	1	0
Lucas Guzmán (ARG)	3	0	5

Semifinals
Jhon Garrido (COL)	2	3
Yohandri Granado (VEN)	8	10
Braven Park (CAN)	3	1	2
Lucas Guzmán (ARG)	3	1	5

3rd place
Jhon Garrido (COL)
Braven Park (CAN)	WD

=== −68 kg ===
9 April

Round of 16
Sergio Olguín (BOL)	DQ
~~Samaki Pinas (SUR)~~
José Luis Acuña (ARG)	9	8
William Ordoñez (NCA)	0	2
Zahyon Klaber (ARU)	4	11	2
Diego Montúfar (GUA)	12	4	6
Rabbin Vicente (HON)	5	9
Jhonny Saintilbert (HAI)	3	0

Quarterfinals
Edival Pontes (BRA)	13	13
Sergio Olguín (BOL)	0	0
José Luis Acuña (ARG)	4	11
Federico González (URU)	4	2
Ignacio Morales (CHI)	8	16
Diego Montúfar (GUA)	0	2
Rabbin Vicente (HON)	1	1
Bernardo Pié (DOM)	3	13

Semifinals
Edival Pontes (BRA)	14	6
José Luis Acuña (ARG)	0	5
Ignacio Morales (CHI)	5	0
Bernardo Pié (DOM)	10	11^{P}

3rd place
José Luis Acuña (ARG)	6	WD
Ignacio Morales (CHI)	0

=== −80 kg ===
9 April

Round of 16
Kelvin Calderón (CUB)	1	4	8
Hassani Andrade (PER)	7	4	1
David Robleto (NCA)	13	0	6
Tosh van Dijk (SUR)	10	7	9
Justin Choy (GUY)	1	0
Joaquín Churchill (CHI)	6	7
Francisco Lara (ESA)	1	12	0
Brandon Sealy (JAM)	2	5	1
Alejandro Flores (CRC)	6	5
Diego Vargas (PUR)	8	11^{P}

Quarterfinals
Miguel Trejos (COL)	3	2
Kelvin Calderón (CUB)	5	9
Tosh van Dijk (SUR)	3	0
Joaquín Churchill (CHI)	5	4
Moisés Hernández (DOM)	3	8
Brandon Sealy (JAM)	0	3
Diego Vargas (PUR)	0	4
Henrique Marques (BRA)	12	14

Semifinals
Kelvin Calderón (CUB)	1	1
Joaquín Churchill (CHI)	6	8
Moisés Hernández (DOM)	0	0
Henrique Marques (BRA)	0	0

3rd place
Kelvin Calderón (CUB)	6	1
Moisés Hernández (DOM)	2	0

=== +80 kg ===
10 April

Quarterfinals
Jonathan Healy (USA)	6	8
Miguel Ferrera (HON)	2	1
César Nazareno (ECU)	2	0
Luis Álvarez (VEN)	5	12
Marc-André Bergeron (CAN)	8	12
Chioke Holder (BAR)	0	0
Daniel Dasent-Thomson (TTO)	0	0
Rafael Alba (CUB)	12^{P}	10

Semifinals
Jonathan Healy (USA)	4	7
Luis Álvarez (VEN)	0	5
Marc-André Bergeron (CAN)	2	2
Rafael Alba (CUB)	5	7

3rd place
Luis Álvarez (VEN)	6	0	10
Marc-André Bergeron (CAN)	2	5	7

== Women ==
=== −49 kg ===
9 April

Round of 16
Riccy Talbott (HON)	9	3	10
Alessandra Suárez (PER)	4	3	3
Josipa Kafadar (CAN)	5	3
Marlyn Pérez (CUB)	1	0
Jireh Hurtado (BOL)	4	1
Keishlie Santiago (PUR)	8	2
Karoline Castillo (PAN)	3	3
Erika Narváez (NCA)	0	3
Andrea Aguilar (ESA)	1	6	0
Virginia Dellán (VEN)	14	5	12
María Sara Grippoli (URU)	5	5	5
Ceili Peterson (GUY)	7	0	2

Quarterfinals
Andrea Ramírez (COL)	8	3	12
Riccy Talbott (HON)	0	3	0
Josipa Kafadar (CAN)	3	13
Keishlie Santiago (PUR)	2	6
Karoline Castillo (PAN)	3	0
Virginia Dellán (VEN)	5	2
María Sara Grippoli (URU)	9	7	5
Laura Sancho (CRC)	1	8	2

Semifinals
Andrea Ramírez (COL)	2	1	1
Josipa Kafadar (CAN)	0	4	1
Virginia Dellán (VEN)	2	5
María Sara Grippoli (URU)	2	12

3rd place
Andrea Ramírez (COL)
Virginia Dellán (VEN)	WD

=== −57 kg ===
10 April

Quarterfinals
Faith Dillon (USA)	12	9
Mariling Vanegas (NCA)	0	0
Alisson Montano (ESA)	3	0	0
Camila Cáceres (PER)	0	0	0
Nishy Lee Lindo (CRC)	7	5
Celeste Áñez (BOL)	0	1
Serena van Dijk (SUR)	0	0
Maria Clara Pacheco (BRA)	12	14

Semifinals
Faith Dillon (USA)	7	6
Alisson Montano (ESA)	0	0
Nishy Lee Lindo (CRC)	0	1
Maria Clara Pacheco (BRA)	3	6

3rd place
Alisson Montano (ESA)	5	3
Nishy Lee Lindo (CRC)	5	12

=== −67 kg ===
9 April

Quarterfinals
Mell Mina (ECU)	17	4	4
Kristina Teachout (USA)	15	17	17
Ava Lee (HAI)	3	3	3
Madelyn Rodríguez (DOM)	2	9	8
Yade Bongsomenggolo (SUR)	0	0
Claudia Gallardo (CHI)	7	13

Semifinals
Leslie Soltero (MEX)	5	4
Kristina Teachout (USA)	11	7
Madelyn Rodríguez (DOM)	1	3
Claudia Gallardo (CHI)	1	0

3rd place
Leslie Soltero (MEX)	2	2
Claudia Gallardo (CHI)	1	0

=== +67 kg ===
10 April

Round of 16
Fernanda Aguirre (CHI)	5	3
Dayana Folleco (ECU)	4	2
Aliyah Shipman (HAI)	10	8
Megan Lawrence (TTO)	3	0
Yosselyn Molina (HON)	4	2	6
Carolina Fernández (VEN)	2	8	12
Arlettys Acosta (CUB)	13	13
Maelynn Fradl (ARU)	0	0

Quarterfinals
Gloria Mosquera (COL)	3	0
Fernanda Aguirre (CHI)	5	6
Aliyah Shipman (HAI)	6	12
Victoria Rivas (ARG)	2	9
Katherine Rodríguez (DOM)	2	0	8
Carolina Fernández (VEN)	0	0	0
Arlettys Acosta (CUB)	1	4	1
Crystal Weekes (PUR)	4	0	0

Semifinals
Fernanda Aguirre (CHI)	6	6
Aliyah Shipman (HAI)	1	0
Katherine Rodríguez (DOM)	0	2
Arlettys Acosta (CUB)	8	2

3rd place
Aliyah Shipman (HAI)
Katherine Rodríguez (DOM)	WD
