= Haiti at the 2003 Pan American Games =

- IOC code: HAI
- NOC: Comité Olympique Haïtien
- Website: www.olympic.org/haiti

in Santo Domingo 1–17 August 2003
- Flag bearer: Dudley Dorival
- Medals Ranked 21st: Gold 0 Silver 1 Bronze 2 Total 3

Pan American Games appearances (overview)
- 1951; 1955; 1959; 1963; 1967; 1971; 1975; 1979; 1983; 1987; 1991; 1995; 1999; 2003; 2007; 2011; 2015; 2019; 2023; 2027

The 14th Pan American Games were held in Santo Domingo, Dominican Republic from August 1 to August 17, 2003.

== Medals ==
=== Silver ===
===== Judo =====
- Men's Heavyweight (+ 100 kg): Joel Brutus

=== Bronze ===
===== Judo =====
- Men's Lightweight (– 73 kg): Ernst Laraque

===== Taekwondo =====
- Men's + 80 kg: Sanon Tudor

== See also ==
- Haiti at the 2004 Summer Olympics
