= Haiti at the 2019 Pan American Games =

- IOC code: HAI
- NOC: Comité Olympique Haïtien
- Website: www.olympic.org/haiti

in Lima, Peru 26 July–11 August, 2019
- Competitors: 7 in 4 sports
- Flag bearer: Aniya Louissaint (opening)
- Medals: Gold 0 Silver 0 Bronze 0 Total 0

Pan American Games appearances (overview)
- 1951; 1955; 1959; 1963; 1967; 1971; 1975; 1979; 1983; 1987; 1991; 1995; 1999; 2003; 2007; 2011; 2015; 2019; 2023; 2027

Haiti competed at the 2019 Pan American Games in Lima, Peru from July 26 to August 11, 2019. Haiti is one of only 17 countries to have participated in all editions of the Pan American Games.

In July 2019, the Haitian team of eight athletes (four per gender) competing in six sports was officially named. This was later reduced to seven when rower Gabrielle Amato withdrew after sustaining an injury.

During the opening ceremony of the games, taekwondo athlete Aniya Louissaint carried the flag of the country as part of the parade of nations.

== Competitors ==
The following is the list of number of competitors (per gender) participating at the games per sport/discipline.

Sport	Men	Women	Total
Athletics (track and field)	2	1	3
Judo	1	0	1
Swimming	1	1	2
Taekwondo	0	1	1
Total	4	3	7

== Athletics (track and field) ==
Haiti qualified three athletes (two men and one woman).

Key

- Note–Ranks given for track events are for the entire round
- Q = Qualified for the next round

Track events

Athlete	Event	Semifinals		Final	
Athlete	Event	Result	Rank	Result	Rank
Jeffrey Julmis	Men's 110 m hurdles	14.02	11	did not advance	
Vanessa Clerveaux	Women's 100 m hurdles	12.99	5 Q	13.17	6

Field event
Men

Athlete	Event	Final	
Athlete	Event	Distance	Position
Abel Vest	Discus throw	48.76	8

== Judo ==
Haiti qualified one male judoka.

Men

Athlete	Event	Preliminaries	Quarterfinals	Semifinals	Repechage	Final / BM	
Athlete	Event	Opposition Result	Opposition Result	Opposition Result	Opposition Result	Opposition Result	Rank
Philippe Metellus	73 kg	Langlois (CAN); L 00S1–110	did not advance				

== Swimming ==
Haiti received two universality spots in swimming to enter one man and one woman.

Key

- Note – Ranks given are for the entire round

Athlete	Event	Heat		Final	
Athlete	Event	Time	Rank	Time	Rank
Alexandre Grand'Pierre	Men's 100 m breaststroke	1:07.32	25	did not advance	
Alexandre Grand'Pierre	Men's 200 m breaststroke	2:27.06	21	did not advance	
Émilie Grand'Pierre	Women's 100 m breaststroke	1:17.04	19	did not advance	
Émilie Grand'Pierre	Women's 200 m breaststroke	2:51.71	20	did not advance	

== Taekwondo ==
Haiti received one wildcard in the women's +67 kg event.

Kyorugi
Women

Athlete	Event	Round of 16	Quarterfinals	Semifinals	Repechage	Final / BM	Rank
Athlete	Event	Opposition Result	Opposition Result	Opposition Result	Opposition Result	Opposition Result	Rank
Aniya Louissaint	+67 kg	Fidelis (BRA); L 3–18	did not advance				

== Non-competing sports ==
=== Rowing ===
Haiti received a reallocated quota in the women's single sculls event. Gabrielle Amato had to later withdraw after sustaining a back injury before the games.

== See also ==
- Haiti at the 2020 Summer Olympics
