= Taekwondo at the 2022 Mediterranean Games – Women's 67 kg =

Taekwondo competition

Taekwondo – Women's 67 kg at the 2022 Mediterranean Games
- Venue: Mohammed Ben Ahmed Convention Centre
- Date: 4 July
- Competitors: 12 from 12 nations

Medalists
gold medal	Matea Jelić	Croatia
silver medal	Cecilia Castro	Spain
bronze medal	Aya Shehata	Egypt
bronze medal	Magda Wiet-Hénin	France

The women's 67 kg competition in taekwondo at the 2022 Mediterranean Games was held on 4 July at the Mohammed ben Ahmed CCO in Oran, Algeria

== Results ==
Legend

- PTG — Won by Points Gap
- SUP — Won by superiority
- OT — Won on over time (Golden Point)
- DQ — Won by disqualification
- PUN — Won by punitive declaration
- WD — Won by withdrawal

Round of 16
Zorana Sandić (BIH)	5
Anamarija Georgievska (MKD)	13
Racha Atamani (ALG)	6
Mervenur Evci (TUR)	17
Cristina Gaspa (ITA)	3
Safia Salih (MAR)	4

Quarterfinals
Matea Jelić (CRO)	28^{PTG}
Anamarija Georgievska (MKD)	2
Aya Shehata (EGY)	4^{SUP}
Aleksandra Perišić (SRB)	4
Cecilia Castro (ESP)	19
Mervenur Evci (TUR)	5
Safia Salih (MAR)	1
Magda Wiet-Hénin (FRA)	21^{PTG}

Semifinals
Matea Jelić (CRO)	8
Aya Shehata (EGY)	5
Cecilia Castro (ESP)	19
Magda Wiet-Hénin (FRA)	15

Final
Matea Jelić (CRO)	8
Cecilia Castro (ESP)	7
