= Taekwondo at the 2023 Pan American Games – Women's 67 kg =

Women's 67 kg at the 2023 Pan American Games
- Venue: Contact Sports Center
- Start date: October 22, 2023
- End date: October 22, 2023

Medalists
| Gold medal | Leslie Soltero | Mexico |
| Silver medal | Ava Soon Lee | Haiti |
| Bronze medal | Claudia Gallardo | Chile |
| Bronze medal | Kristina Teachout | United States |

The women's 67 kg competition of the taekwondo events at the 2023 Pan American Games in Santiago, Chile, was held on October 22 at the Contact Sports Center.

== Qualification ==
The host nation, Chile, qualified automatically and the quotas spots were awarded at the qualification tournament held in Rio de Janeiro in March 2023. The final quota spots were awarded as wildcards (if applicable).

== Results ==
=== Bracket ===
Round of 16
Naishka Torres (PUR) | 0
Mell Mina (ECU) | 2
Ava Soon Lee (HAI) | 2
Yosselyn Molina (HON) | 0
Eliana Vásquez (PER) | 0
Claudia Gallardo (CHI) | 2
Ashley Kraayeveld (CAN) | 2
Laura Ramírez (COL) | 1
Madelyn Rodríguez (DOM) | 1
Itzel Velázquez (MEX) | 2
Kristina Teachout (USA) | 2
Arlettys de la Caridad (CUB) | 0
Jarolit Castellanos (VEN) | 0
Leslie Soltero (MEX) | 2

Quarterfinals
Caroline Santos (BRA) | 2
Mell Mina (ECU) | 0
Ava Soon Lee (HAI) | 1
Claudia Gallardo (CHI) | 1
Ashley Kraayeveld (CAN) | 2
Itzel Velázquez (MEX) | 0
Kristina Teachout (USA) | 0
Leslie Soltero (MEX) | 2

Semifinals
Caroline Santos (BRA) | 1
Ava Soon Lee (HAI) | 2
Ashley Kraayeveld (CAN) | 1
Leslie Soltero (MEX) | 2

Gold medal match
Ava Soon Lee (HAI) | 0
Leslie Soltero (MEX) | 2

=== Repechage ===
| Repechage | | Bronze medal match |
| Yosselyn Molina (HON) | 0 |
| Claudia Gallardo (CHI) | 2 |
| Claudia Gallardo (CHI) | 2 | Claudia Gallardo (CHI) | 2 |
| | | Ashley Kraayeveld (CAN) | 0 |

| Repechage | | Bronze medal match |
| Jarolit Castellanos (VEN) | 0 |
| Kristina Teachout (USA) | 2 |
| Kristina Teachout (USA) | 2 | Kristina Teachout (USA) |
| | | Caroline Santos (BRA) | DNS |
