= Maria Clara Pacheco =

Brazilian taekwondo practitioner

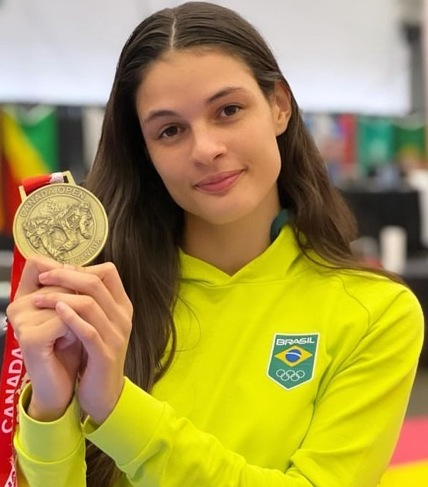
- Pacheco at the 2024 Canadian Open

Personal information
- Nationality: Brazilian
- Born: Maria Clara Pacheco Lima; 16 July 2003 (age 23) São Vicente, São Paulo, Brazil

Sport
- Sport: Taekwondo
- Weight class: Featherweight
Medal record
Women's taekwondo
Representing Brazil
World Championships
Gold medal – first place	2025 Wuxi	–57 kg
Bronze medal – third place	2023 Baku	–57 kg
Grand Prix
Gold medal – first place	2025 Charlotte	–57 kg
Gold medal – first place	2025 Muju	–57 kg
Gold medal – first place	2026 Rome	–57 kg
Gold medal – first place	2026 Muju	–57 kg
Gold medal – first place	2026 Paris	–57 kg
Pan American Games
Silver medal – second place	2023 Santiago	–57 kg
Bronze medal – third place	2023 Santiago	Team
South American Games
Gold medal – first place	2026 Santa Fe	–57 kg
Universiade
Gold medal – first place	2025 Rhine-Ruhr	–57 kg
World Cadet Championships
Bronze medal – third place	2017 Sharm El Sheikh	–47 kg

Maria Clara Pacheco (born 16 July 2003) is a Brazilian taekwondo practitioner. She earned a gold medal at the 2025 World Taekwondo Championships.

Pacheco is also a five-time gold medalist at the World Grand Prix.

== Early life ==
Pacheco was born in São Vicente, Brazil. In 2021, she moved to São Caetano do Sul.

== Career ==
In August 2017, Pacheco won a bronze medal at the World Taekwondo Cadet Championships in Sharm El Sheikh, Egypt.

In 2023 season, Pacheco started competing in senior taekwondo. She made her Grand Prix series debut that year in Paris, where she reached the quarterfinals.

The Brazilian won a bronze medal in the Women's featherweight at the 2023 World Taekwondo Championships in Baku, losing to eventual champion Luana Márton in the semi-final. In doing so, she became only Brazilian to have won medals in Taekwondo World Championships in both the senior and cadet levels.

In October 2023, Pacheco won a silver medal at the Pan American Games. She also won a bronze in the team event at the games.

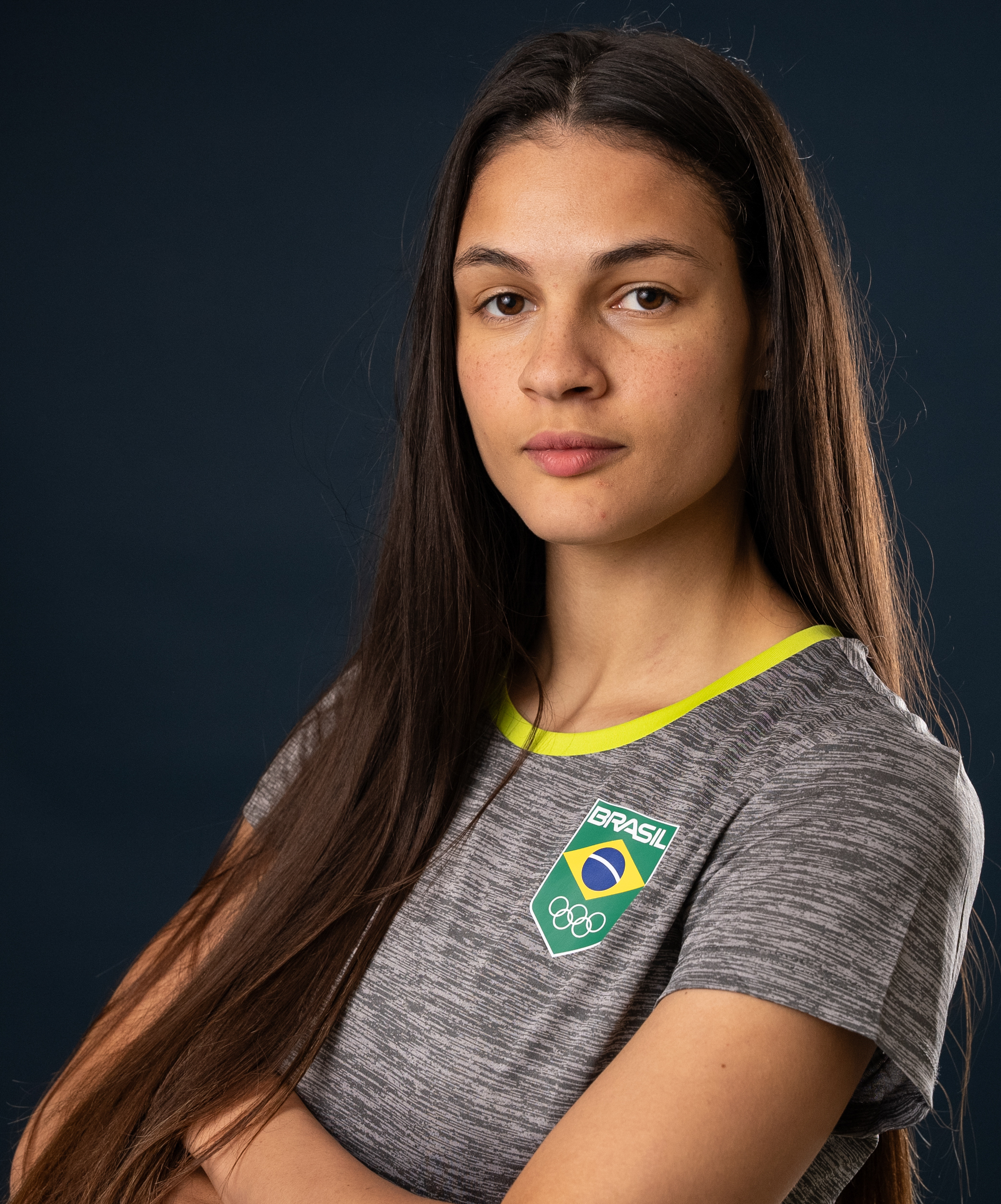
Pacheco at the 2023 Pan American Games

In April 2024, competing at the regional Olympic qualifying event in Dominican Republic, Pacheco won a place at the 2024 Summer Olympics.

In June 2025, Pacheco won the gold medal at the 2025 Charlotte Grand Prix and claimed her first podium finish at the event. She competed in the women’s 57kg category and defeated Luo Zongshi of China in the final with a score of 2–0, without conceding a single point (17–0, 12–0).

Pacheco won the gold medal in the -57kg category at the 2025 World University Games in Germany, recording a 2–0 victory over Chaima Toumi of Tunisia in the final. In October, she won the gold medal at the 2025 World Championships in Wuxi, China, where she defeated reigning Olympic champion Kim Yu-jin of Korea 2–0 in the final.

Later that year, Pacheco won both the trophies for best Brazilian taekwondo athlete of the year and for Brazilian female athlete of the year at that year's edition of the Prêmio Brasil Olímpico (Brazil Olympic Prize).

== Minor-level titles ==
- 2024 Canadian Open
- 2026 Brazil Open

== Awards and Honors ==
2025

- Prêmio Brasil Olímpico - taekwondo
- Prêmio Brasil Olímpico - Brazilian female athlete of the year
