= 2024 European Taekwondo Championships – Women's 57 kg =

Women's 57 kg at the 2024 European Taekwondo Championships
- Venue: Belgrade Fair – Hall 1
- Location: Belgrade, Serbia
- Dates: 12 May
- Competitors: 27 from 27 nations

Medalists
gold medal	Nika Karabatić	Croatia
silver medal	Jade Jones	Great Britain
bronze medal	Luana Márton	Hungary
bronze medal	Fani Tzeli	Greece

The women's 57 kg competition at the 2024 European Taekwondo Championships was held on 12 May 2024.

== Results ==
=== Finals ===
Semifinals
Jade Jones (GBR)	2
Fani Tzeli (GRE)	0
Luana Márton (HUN)	0
Nika Karabatić (CRO)	2

Final
Jade Jones (GBR)	1
Nika Karabatić (CRO)	2

=== Top half ===
==== Section 1 ====
Round of 32
Darya Kostenevych (UKR)	2
Gabriela Coman (ROU)	0
Kanélya Carabin (FRA)	2
Džejna Hamzić (BIH)	0
Andrea Komatina (MNE)	0
Klaudija Tvaronavičiūtė (LTU)	2

Round of 16
Jade Jones (GBR)	2
Darya Kostenevych (UKR)	0
Kanélya Carabin (FRA)	1
Klaudija Tvaronavičiūtė (LTU)	2

Quarterfinals
Jade Jones (GBR)	2
Klaudija Tvaronavičiūtė (LTU)	0

==== Section 2 ====
Round of 32
Martina Atanasova (BUL)	2
Ruqia Rahmani (FIN)	1
Fani Tzeli (GRE)	2
Yuliya Vitko (AIN)	1

Round of 16
Raheleh Asemani (BEL)	2
Martina Atanasova (BUL)	0
Fani Tzeli (GRE)	2
Ela Marić (SRB)	1

Quarterfinals
Raheleh Asemani (BEL)	0
Fani Tzeli (GRE)	2

=== Bottom half ===
==== Section 3 ====
Round of 32
Leyla Bashirova (AZE)	0
Margarita Blizniakova (AIN)	2
Laura Rodríguez (ESP)	2
Markella Teggeri (CYP)	0
Iulia Nazarova (MDA)	0
Giada Al Halwani (ITA)	2

Round of 16
Luana Márton (HUN)	2
Margarita Blizniakova (AIN)	1
Laura Rodríguez (ESP)	0
Giada Al Halwani (ITA)	2

Quarterfinals
Luana Márton (HUN)	2
Giada Al Halwani (ITA)	0

==== Section 4 ====
Round of 32
Bodine Schoenmakers (NED)	2
Leonor Correia (POR)	0
Mariam Mahnu (DEN)	0
Nika Karabatić (CRO)	2
Ingibjörg Grétarsdóttir (ISL)	0
Hana Flegrová (CZE)	2

Round of 16
Bodine Schoenmakers (NED)	0
Nika Karabatić (CRO)	2
Hana Flegrová (CZE)	0
Hatice Kübra İlgün (TUR)	2

Quarterfinals
Nika Karabatić (CRO)	2
Hatice Kübra İlgün (TUR)	1
