= Taekwondo at the 2023 Pan American Games – Women's 57 kg =

Women's 57 kg at the 2023 Pan American Games
- Venue: Contact Sports Center
- Start date: October 21, 2023
- End date: October 21, 2023
- Competitors: 14 from 14 nations

Medalists
Gold medal	Skylar Park	Canada
Silver medal	Maria Clara Pacheco	Brazil
Bronze medal	Caitlyn Cox	United States
Bronze medal	Carolena Carstens	Panama

The women's 57 kg competition of the taekwondo events at the 2023 Pan American Games in Santiago, Chile, was held on October 22 at the Contact Sports Center.

== Qualification ==
The host nation, Chile, qualified automatically and the quotas spots were awarded at the qualification tournament held in Rio de Janeiro in March 2023. The final quota spots were awarded as wildcards (if applicable).

== Results ==
=== Bracket ===
Round of 16
Mayerlin Mejia (DOM)	0
Caitlyn Cox (USA)	1
Carolena Carstens (PAN)	2
Carla Tito (ECU)	1
Maria Celeste Añez Lara (BOL)	2
Nishy Lee Lindo Alvarez (CRC)	1
Alexmar Sulbaran (VEN)	2
Carla Godoy (ARG)	1
Camila Caceres Gonzales (PER)	0
Allison Montano (ESA)	2

Quarterfinals
Skylar Park (CAN)	2
Caitlyn Cox (USA)	0
Carolena Carstens (PAN)	2
Maria Celeste Añez Lara (BOL)	0
Maria Clara Pacheco (BRA)	2
Alexmar Sulbaran (VEN)	0
Allison Montano (ESA)	0
Fabiola Villegas (MEX)	2

Semifinals
Skylar Park (CAN)	2
Carolena Carstens (PAN)	1
Fabiola Villegas (MEX)	0
Maria Clara Pacheco (BRA)	2

Gold medal match
Skylar Park (CAN)	2
Maria Clara Pacheco (BRA)	1

=== Repechage ===
Bronze medal match
Carolena Carstens (PAN)	2
Alexmar Sulbaran (VEN)	0

Bronze medal match
Fabiola Villegas (MEX)	0
Caitlyn Cox (USA)	2
