= Sarah Chaâri =

Belgian taekwondo practitioner (born 2005)

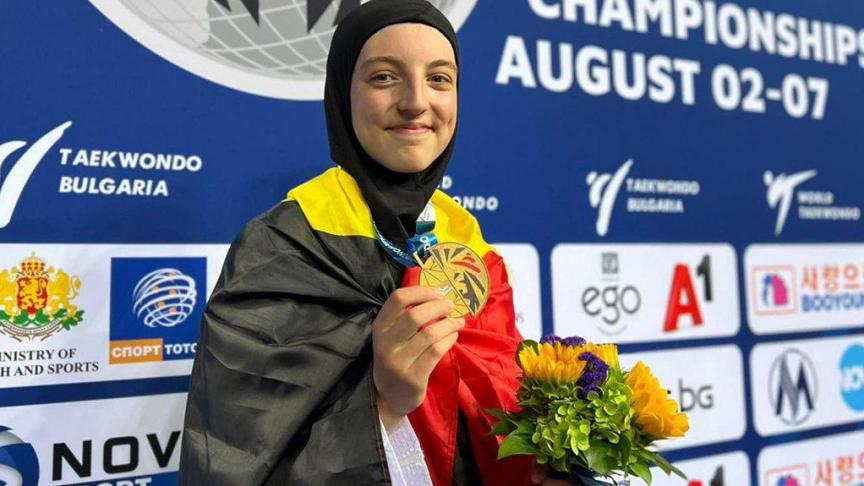
- Chaâri in 2024

Personal information
- Nationality: Belgian
- Born: 2 May 2005 (age 21) Belgium
- Home town: Charleroi, Belgium
- Height: 191 cm (6 ft 3 in)
Medal record
Women's taekwondo
Representing Belgium
Olympic Games
Bronze medal – third place	2024 Paris	67 kg
World Championships
Gold medal – first place	2022 Guadalajara	62 kg
Gold medal – first place	2025 Wuxi	73 kg
Grand Prix
Gold medal – first place	2023 Manchester (F)	67 kg
Silver medal – second place	2023 Rome	67 kg
Silver medal – second place	2023 Taiyuan	67 kg
Silver medal – second place	2025 Bangkok	67 kg
Bronze medal – third place	2022 Paris	67 kg
European Games
Gold medal – first place	2023 Kraków-Małopolska	62 kg
European Championships
Gold medal – first place	2024 Belgrade	67 kg
Gold medal – first place	2026 Munich	73 kg
Bronze medal – third place	2022 Manchester	62 kg
World Junior Championships
Gold medal – first place	2022 Sofia	63 kg
European Junior Championships
Gold medal – first place	2021 Sarajevo	59 kg
World University Games
Silver medal – second place	2025 Rhine-Ruhr	73 kg
Bronze medal – third place	2021 Chengdu	67 kg

Sarah Chaâri (born 2 May 2005) is a Belgian taekwondo practitioner and Olympic medal winner.

== Career ==
Chaâri came to prominence by winning the gold medal in the 2022 World Taekwondo Junior Championships in Sofia in August 2022.

Later that year she moved up to the senior division, and won also the gold medal in the women's lightweight event at the senior level 2022 World Taekwondo Championships in Guadalajara, Mexico becoming Belgium's first female World Taekwondo champion. In doing so, Chaâri also became the first-ever Taekwondo fighter to win golds at both Junior and Senior World Championships in the same year.

Chaâri earned a gold medal at the 2023 European Games in the women's 62 kg event. She also won the 2023 World Taekwondo Grand Prix women's 67 kg event final in Manchester, which qualified her to compete at the 2024 Summer Olympics.

In May 2024, Chaâri became European Champion by defeating the reigning world champion Magda Wiet-Henin of France in the final of the 67 kg category. And at the 2024 Summer Olympics later that year in Paris, France, she won the bronze medal in that same 67 kg category.

In October 2025, at the 2025 World Taekwondo Championships in Wuxi, China, she was crowned world champion at the senior level for the second time, this time in the women's middleweight category. She punctuated her victory with a huge quarter-final victory in three rounds against France's Althéa Laurin, the defending world champion in the weight category and +67 kg Olympic gold medalist in Paris.

In February 2026, Chaâri won the gold medal at the 13th Fujairah Open International Taekwondo Championships. In May, she was crowned European champion for a second time at the 2026 European Taekwondo Championships in Munich, Germany.

== Personal life ==
Chaâri studies medicine at the Université libre de Bruxelles, having passed the medical school entrance exam in July 2022 where she ranked in the top 6% candidates. Sarah's father is Moroccan and her mother is Belgian and she is to be considered first-ever European Muslim woman to obtain a medal at Summer Olympics.

== Awards ==
2025

- World Taekwondo Awards – Female Athlete of the Year

2026

- Belgian National Sports Merit Award
