= Andrea Berišaj =

Montenegrin taekwondo practitioner (born 2007)

Personal information
- Native name: Андреа Беришај
- Born: 17 July 2007 (age 18)

Sport
- Country: Montenegro
- Sport: Taekwondo
- Event: 67 kg
Medal record
Representing Montenegro
European Championships
Bronze medal – third place	2026 Munich	67 kg
World U21 Championships
Bronze medal – third place	2025 Nairobi	67 kg
European U21 Championships
Bronze medal – third place	2025 Pristina	67 kg

Andrea Berišaj (Андреа Беришај; born 17 July 2007) is a Montenegrin taekwondo practitioner. Berišaj competes for the Montenegro national team. She won the bronze medal in the women's 67 kg event at the 2026 European Taekwondo Championships.
