= Aleksandra Perišić =

Serbian taekwondo practitioner

Personal information
- Born: 2 July 2002 (age 23) Belgrade, Serbia, FR Yugoslavia
- Height: 178 cm (5 ft 10 in)
- Weight: 67 kg (148 lb)

Sport
- Country: Serbia
- Sport: Taekwondo
- Weight class: 67 kg
Medal record
Women's taekwondo
Representing Serbia
Olympic Games
Silver medal – second place	2024 Paris	67 kg
World Championships
Silver medal – second place	2022 Guadalajara	67 kg
Grand Prix
Gold medal – first place	2023 Taiyuan	67 kg
Silver medal – second place	2022 Manchester	67 kg
European Games
Gold medal – first place	2023 Kraków-Małopolska	67 kg
European Championships
Bronze medal – third place	2022 Manchester	67 kg
Bronze medal – third place	2024 Belgrade	67 kg
Bronze medal – third place	2026 Munich	67 kg

Aleksandra Perišić (born 2 July 2002) is a Serbian taekwondo practitioner. She won a silver medal at the 2024 Summer Olympics in the women's 67 kg event.

== Career ==
Perišić started taekwondo at the age of four. She tore knee ligaments in 2019, almost causing her to leave the sport. She was coached by Croatian Petra Butala Kovačić.

Perišić participated in the 2022 European Taekwondo Championships, held in May in the English city of Manchester. She won a bronze medal in the women's 67 kg event and was congratulated by President of Serbia, Aleksandar Vučić, on Twitter. She represented Serbia at July's 2022 Mediterranean Games held in Oran, Algeria. She competed in the women's 67 kg event where she was eliminated in her first match. Perišić won the silver medal in the women's welterweight event at the 2022 World Taekwondo Championships held in November in Guadalajara, Mexico.

Perišić took part in the 2023 European Games in Krakow, winning gold in the women's 67 kg event after defeating Cecilia Castro of Spain in the final. In December of that year, Perišić and wrestler Stevan Mićić were named the Best Athlete in Belgrade of 2023 by the Sports Association of Belgrade.

In 2024, Perišić won bronze in the women's 67 kg category at the 2024 European Taekwondo Championships, held in May in the Serbian capital Belgrade. It was her country's third medal of the championships, following success for compatriots Lev Korneev and Andrea Bokan. In August that year, she won Olympic silver in the women's 67 kg event at the Games in Paris, being defeated 2–0 in the final by Hungarian opponent Viviana Márton.

In March 2025, Perišić won the women's 67 kg category at the Dutch Open in Eindhoven.
