= Haiti at the 2015 Pan American Games =

- IOC code: HAI
- NOC: Comité Olympique Haïtien
- Website: www.olympic.org/haiti

in Toronto, Canada 10–26 July 2015
- Competitors: 11 in 5 sports
- Flag bearer (opening): Edouard Joseph
- Flag bearer (closing): Marlena Wesh
- Medals: Gold 0 Silver 0 Bronze 0 Total 0

Pan American Games appearances (overview)
- 1951; 1955; 1959; 1963; 1967; 1971; 1975; 1979; 1983; 1987; 1991; 1995; 1999; 2003; 2007; 2011; 2015; 2019; 2023

Haiti competed at the 2015 Pan American Games in Toronto, Ontario, Canada from July 10 to 26, 2015.

On July 3, 2015, a team of 11 athletes in 5 sports was announced by the Comité Olympique Haïtien. Weightlifter Edouard Joseph was the flagbearer for the team during the opening ceremony.

Haiti (along with nine other countries) left the games without winning a medal, tying the result from four years prior in 2011.

== Competitors ==
The following table lists Haiti's delegation per sport and gender.

| Sport | Men | Women | Total |
|---|---|---|---|
| Athletics | 3 | 3 | 6 |
| Swimming | 1 | 0 | 1 |
| Taekwondo | 0 | 1 | 1 |
| Weightlifting | 1 | 1 | 2 |
| Wrestling | 1 | 0 | 1 |
| Total | 6 | 5 | 11 |

== Athletics ==
Haiti qualified six athletes (three of each gender).

Key

- Note– Ranks given for track events are for the entire round
- q = Qualified for the next round as a fastest loser or, in field events, by position without achieving the qualifying target
- SB = Seasonal best
- DNF = Did not finish
- N/A = Round not applicable for the event

Men
Track

| Athlete | Event | Round 1 | | Semifinal | | Final | |
| Athlete | Event | Result | Rank | Result | Rank | Result | Rank |
|---|---|---|---|---|---|---|---|
| Darrell Wesh | 100 m | 10.24 | 16 q | 10.32 | 13 | Did not advance | |
| Jeffrey Julmis | 110 m Hurdles | 13.72 | 13 | —N/a | | Did not advance | |

Field

| Athlete | Event | Final | |
| Athlete | Event | Distance | Position |
|---|---|---|---|
| Samyr Lainé | Triple jump | 16.43 SB | 6 |

Women
Track

| Athlete | Event | Semifinal | | Final | |
| Athlete | Event | Result | Rank | Result | Rank |
|---|---|---|---|---|---|
| Marlena Wesh | 400 m | DNF | | Did not advance | |
| Jessica Gelibert | 400 m hurdles | 57.58 | 6 | 1:00.23 | 8 |

Field

| Athlete | Event | Final | |
| Athlete | Event | Distance | Position |
|---|---|---|---|
| Pascale Delaunay | Triple jump | 12.35 | 8 |

== Swimming ==
Haiti received one male universality spot.

Men

| Athlete | Event | Heat | | Final | |
| Athlete | Event | Time | Rank | Time | Rank |
|---|---|---|---|---|---|
| Frantz Dorsainvil | 50 m freestyle | 33.83 | 22 | Did not advance | |

== Taekwondo ==
Haiti received a wildcard to enter one female athlete.

| Athlete | Event | Round of 16 | Quarterfinals | Semifinals | Repechage | Bronze medal | Final | |
| Athlete | Event | Opposition Result | Opposition Result | Opposition Result | Opposition Result | Opposition Result | Opposition Result | Rank |
|---|---|---|---|---|---|---|---|---|
| Aniya Louissaint | Women's -67kg | Cordero (VEN); L 1–3 | Did not advance | | | | | |

== Weightlifting ==
Haiti qualified one male weightlifter. Haiti later received a wildcard to enter a female athlete.

| Athlete | Event | Snatch | | Clean & jerk | | Total | Rank |
| Athlete | Event | Result | Rank | Result | Rank | Total | Rank |
|---|---|---|---|---|---|---|---|
| Edouard Joseph | Men's 56 kg | DNF | | | | | |
| Medgina Celestin | Women's 69 kg | 85 | 9 | 101 | 10 | 186 | 10 |

== Wrestling ==
Haiti received one wildcard.

Men's Greco-Roman

| Athlete | Event | Preliminaries | Quarterfinals | Semifinals | Final |
| Athlete | Event | Opposition Result | Opposition Result | Opposition Result | Opposition Result |
|---|---|---|---|---|---|
| Asnage Castelly | 75 kg | Muñoz (COL); L 2–10 | Did not advance | | |

== See also ==
- Haiti at the 2016 Summer Olympics
