= Kwak Min-ju =

South Korean taekwondo practitioner (born 2004)

Personal information
- Nationality: South Korean
- Born: 3 July 2004 (age 22)
- Education: Korea National Sport University

Sport
- Sport: Taekwondo
- Weight class: 67 kg
Medal record
Women's taekwondo
Representing South Korea
Asian Championships
Silver medal – second place	2026 Ulaanbaatar	67 kg
Bronze medal – third place	2024 Da Nang	67 kg
Asian Games
Bronze medal – third place	2026 Aichi-Nagoya	67 kg
World University Games
Silver medal – second place	2025 Rhine-Ruhr	Team Kyorugi
Bronze medal – third place	2025 Rhine-Ruhr	67 kg
World U21 Championships
Gold medal – first place	2025 Nairobi	67 kg

Kwak Min-ju (Korean: 곽민주, born 3 July 2004) is a South Korean taekwondo practitioner.

== Career ==
Kwak competed at the 2024 Asian Taekwondo Championships and won a bronze medal in the 67 kg category.

In June 2025, she competed at the World Taekwondo Grand Prix Challenge in Charlotte, North Carolina, and won a silver medal, losing to Lena Moreno in the finals. The next month she competed at the 2025 Summer World University Games and won a silver medal in the team kyorugi event, as the discipline made its debut as a medal event. She also won a bronze medal in the 67 kg category. In December 2025, she competed at the 2025 World U21 Taekwondo Championships and won a gold medal in the 67 kg category.
