= Lena Moreno =

Spanish taekwondo practitioner (born 2006)

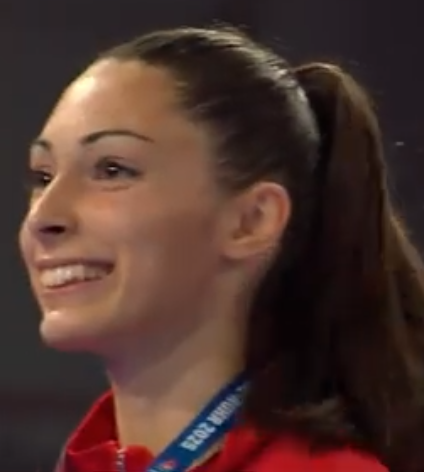
- At the 2025 Summer World University Games

Personal information
- Full name: Lena Moreno Reyes
- Nationality: Spanish
- Born: 26 July 2006 (age 19) Guadalajara, Mexico

Sport
- Sport: Taekwondo
- Weight class: 67 kg
- Club: Hankuk Club
Medal record
Women's taekwondo
Representing Spain
World Championships
Bronze medal – third place	2025 Wuxi	67 kg
World University Games
Silver medal – second place	2025 Rhine-Ruhr	67 kg

Lena Moreno Reyes (born 26 July 2006) is a Spanish taekwondo practitioner. She won a bronze medal at the 2025 World Taekwondo Championships.

== Early life ==
Moreno was born and raised in Guadalajara, Spain, and is the daughter of former Olympic taekwondo practitioner Sonia Reyes.

== Career ==
Moreno competed at the 2023 European U21 Taekwondo Championships and won a gold medal in the 67 kg category.

In June 2025, she competed at the World Taekwondo Grand Prix Challenge in Charlotte, North Carolina, and won a gold medal, defeating Kwak Min-ju in the finals. The next month she competed at the 2025 Summer World University Games and won a silver medal in the 67 kg category. In October 2025, she competed at the 2025 World Taekwondo Championships and won a bronze medal in the 67 kg category.
