= Frederik Emil Olsen =

Swedish taekwondo practitioner

Personal information
- Nationality: Swedish
- Born: Frederik Emil Olsen; 3 October 2002 (age 23) Copenhagen, Denmark
- Weight: 58 kg (128 lb)

Sport
- Country: Sweden
- Sport: Taekwondo
- Event: 58kg
- Club: Soo Shim
- Coached by: Niklas Andersson
Medal record
Representing Sweden
Men's taekwondo
European Championships
Bronze medal – third place	2021 Sofia	58 kg
European U21 Championships
Bronze medal – third place	2021 Tallinn	58 kg

Frederik Emil Olsen (born 3 October 2002) is a Danish-born Swedish taekwondo athlete. He won the bronze medal at the 2021 European Taekwondo Championships at the under 58 kg weight category.

== Early life ==
Olsen was born in Copenhagen, Denmark but at 10 years old moved to Skellefteå, Sweden to sign a contract with Soo Shim, after he revealed his natural talent at taekwondo sparring. His most viewed sparring video on YouTube has over half a million views as he was known as "The Taekwondo Kid" at the time, being invited to Kukkiwon several times for promoting the sport and being considered a prodigy by them. Later on, he won the bronze medal at the 2015 European Cadets Championship for Denmark.
