= Haiti at the Pan American Games =

- IOC code: HAI
- NOC: Comité Olympique Haïtien
- Website: www.olympic.org/haiti
- Medals Ranked 37th: Gold 0 Silver 3 Bronze 7 Total 10

Pan American Games appearances (overview)
- 1951; 1955; 1959; 1963; 1967; 1971; 1975; 1979; 1983; 1987; 1991; 1995; 1999; 2003; 2007; 2011; 2015; 2019; 2023

Haiti has competed at the Pan American Games since its inaugural edition in 1951.

== Medal count ==
Year	Host city	Gold	Silver	Bronze	Total
1951	Buenos Aires	0	0	1	1
1955	Mexico City	0	0	0	0
1959	Chicago	0	1	0	1
1963	São Paulo	Did not participate			
1967	Winnipeg	0	0	0	0
1971	Cali	0	0	0	0
1975	Mexico City	0	0	0	0
1979	San Juan	0	0	0	0
1983	Caracas	0	0	0	0
1987	Indianapolis	0	0	0	0
1991	Havana	0	0	1	1
1995	Mar del Plata	0	0	0	0
1999	Winnipeg	0	0	0	0
2003	Santo Domingo	0	1	2	3
2007	Rio de Janeiro	0	0	1	1
2011	Guadalajara	0	0	0	0
2015	Toronto	0	0	0	0
2019	Lima	0	0	0	0
2023	Santiago	0	1	2	3
Total		0	3	7	10

=== Medals by sport ===
Sport	Gold	Silver	Bronze	Total
Judo	0	1	3	4
Weightlifting	0	1	1	2
Taekwondo	0	0	1	1
Totals (3 entries)	0	2	5	7
