= Haiti at the 2007 Pan American Games =

- IOC code: HAI
- NOC: Comité Olympique Haïtien
- Website: www.olympic.org/haiti

in Rio de Janeiro 13–29 July 2007
- Competitors: 38
- Flag bearer: Ange Marcie
- Medals Ranked 25th: Gold 0 Silver 0 Bronze 1 Total 1

Pan American Games appearances (overview)
- 1951; 1955; 1959; 1963; 1967; 1971; 1975; 1979; 1983; 1987; 1991; 1995; 1999; 2003; 2007; 2011; 2015; 2019; 2023

The 15th Pan American Games were held in Rio de Janeiro, Brazil from 13 July 2007 to 29 July 2007.

== Medals ==
=== Bronze ===
===== Judo =====
- Men's Heavyweight (+ 100 kg): Joel Brutus
