= Marzieh Hamidi =

Afghan athlete (born c.2002)

Personal information
- Born: 2002 (age 23–24) Iran

Sport
- Sport: Taekwondo
- Weight class: +57

Marzieh Hamidi (born c. 2002; Dari: مرضیه حمیدی) is an Afghan taekwondo athlete and activist.

== Life ==
Hamidi was born in Iran in 2002. She is a Tajik. When she was 12 years old, she and her family decided to move to Germany. However, as they reached the Iran-Turkey border, the Iranian police caught and deported them to Herat. However, she and her families felt insecure in Herat and decided to move to Kabul on the next day. In 2016, she and her family moved to Iran. She returned to Afghanistan in 2019.

After the Taliban took over of Kabul in August 2021, she had to wear Burqa three times bigger than her size to hang out with her friends in cafe and forced to move home thrice. Furthermore, two weeks after the fall of Kabul, she participated in the protest She and her family left Afghanistan on 24 November 2021 for France with a brief transit in Doha. Upon arriving in France, she lives in Vincennes. On 25 September 2025, she will release a book with Robert Laffont titled Ils n'auront pas mon silence.

=== Taekwondo career ===
Hamidi was introduced to taekwondo by her Iranian friend due to her boredom since she could not attend school as she was an illegal immigrant in Iran.

As she returned to Kabul, she joined taekwondo club. She participated in taekwondo championship and earned gold at the national tournament five times. She also won Kabul taekwondo championship.

After arriving in France, she continued her taekwondo career. She again joined taekwondo club. On 18 December 2022, she won third place for women 57 kg category at the French National Taekwondo Championship. She participated in the 2023 World Taekwondo Championships representing Refugee Team and eliminated in the first round after lost to Arlet Ortiz. She partook in the selection of Refugee Olympic Team for women's -57 kg category.

=== Activism ===
Apart from her taekwondo career, she became a women's rights activist in exile. She spoke against the Taliban government in international conferences and media. She also called to boycott Afghan sport teams for participating in the Olympics for normalizing with the Taliban government.

Hamidi criticized Rashid Khan for his meeting with Anas Haqqani and Sirajuddin Haqqani and called him a "terrorist". She also stated that Afghanistan national cricket team was a "terrorist team" for normalizing with the Taliban and dominated by Pashtuns.

Due to her criticism towards Rashid and the cricket team, she received cyber bullying and rape and death threats. The harassment intensified when her WhatsApp number leaked to the public. She also received more than 5000 calls and messages. A Taliban member from Farah offered bounty for those who were able to assassinate her. Her parents also subjected to harassment in Germany.

In response to the harassment that Hamidi received, she currently lives under police protection. She had to change her phone number.

== Awards ==
- Medal of Honor of National Assembly.
- German Dream (Honorary Award; 2024).
