= Mari Romundset Nilsen =

Norwegian taekwondo practitioner

Personal information
- Nationality: Norwegian
- Born: 7 October 2003 (age 22)

Sport
- Country: Norway
- Sport: Taekwondo
- Weight class: Welterweight
Medal record
Women's taekwondo
Representing Norway
World Championships
Bronze medal – third place	2023 Baku	67kg

Mari Romundset Nilsen (born 7 October 2003) is a Norwegian taekwondo practitioner. She was a bronze medalist at the 2023 World Taekwondo Championships.

== Career ==
From Aure Municipality in Norway, she is a member of Aure Kampsportklubb. She became senior Norwegian taekwondo champion in December 2021.

She was runner-up to Britain's Chloe Roberts at the 2022 European Club Championships in Estonia. She made her senior international debut at the 2022 European Taekwondo Championships in Manchester. She was subsequently selected for the 67kg division at the 2022 World Taekwondo Championships in Guadalajara.

In February 2023, she was runner up at the Olympic qualifying event in Istanbul, losing in the final against the Belgian world champion Sarah Chaâri.

She won the bronze medal in the Women’s Welterwight division at the 2023 World Taekwondo Championships. Entering the competition she had a world ranking of 30. In the semifinals she faced the Jordanian world number two Julyana Al-Sadeq.

She was selected to compete at the 2023 European Games in Kraków.
