= Haiti at the 2011 Pan American Games =

- IOC code: HAI
- NOC: Comité Olympique Haïtien
- Website: www.olympic.org/haiti

in Guadalajara 14–30 October 2011
- Competitors: 11 in 5 sports
- Medals: Gold 0 Silver 0 Bronze 0 Total 0

Pan American Games appearances (overview)
- 1951; 1955; 1959; 1963; 1967; 1971; 1975; 1979; 1983; 1987; 1991; 1995; 1999; 2003; 2007; 2011; 2015; 2019; 2023

Haiti competed at the 2011 Pan American Games in Guadalajara, Mexico from October 14 to 30, 2011. Haiti's team consists of 11 athletes in five sports.

== Athletics ==
Haiti sent a team of eight athletes.

=== Track and road events ===
Event	Athletes	Heats		Semifinal		Final	
Event	Athletes	Time	Rank	Time	Rank	Time	Rank
200 m	Jonathan Juin	21.62	5th	did not advance			
200 m	Roudy Monrose	21.63	5th	did not advance			
800 m	Moise Joseph			1:49.12	5th q	1:54.88	8th
110 m hurdles	Jeffrey Julmis			13.87	7th	did not advance	
400 m hurdles	Alie Beauvais			51.67	5th	did not advance	

=== Field events ===
Event	Athletes	Final	
Event	Athletes	Result	Rank
High jump	Josue Louis	2.00 m	16th
Triple jump	Samyr Lainé	16.39 m	5th

=== Field events ===
Event	Athletes	Final	
Event	Athletes	Result	Rank
Triple jump	Pascale Delaunay	12.41 m	13th

== Judo ==
Haiti has qualified one athlete in the 52 kg women's category.

Women

Athlete	Event	Round of 16	Quarterfinals	Semifinals	Final
Athlete	Event	Opposition Result	Opposition Result	Opposition Result	Opposition Result
Linouse Desravines	−52 kg	Angelica Delgado (USA); L 000 – 100	did not advance (to repechage round)		

Repechage Rounds

Athlete	Event	Repechage 8	Repechage Final	Bronze Final
Athlete	Event	Opposition Result	Opposition Result	Opposition Result
Linouse Desravines	−52 kg	Yulieth Sánchez (COL); L 000 – 100	did not advance	

== Taekwondo ==
Haiti have received a wildcard to send one male taekwondo athlete.

Men

Athlete	Event	Round of 16	Quarterfinals	Semifinals	Final
Athlete	Event	Opposition Result	Opposition Result	Opposition Result	Opposition Result
Sanon Tudor	+80 kg	Miguel Ferrera (HON); L 4 – 12	did not advance		

== Tennis ==
Haiti has qualified one male tennis athlete.

Men

Athlete	Event	1st Round	Round of 32	Round of 16	Quarterfinals	Semifinals	Final
Athlete	Event	Opposition Score	Opposition Score	Opposition Score	Opposition Score	Opposition Score	Opposition Score
Olivier Sajous	Singles	Román Recarte (VEN); W 6 – 4, 2 – 6, 6 – 1	Juan Sebastián Cabal (COL); L 2 – 6, 6 – 0, 6(2) – 7	did not advance			

== Weightlifting ==
Haiti has qualified a team of one male athlete.

Athlete	Event	Snatch			Clean & Jerk			Total	Rank
Athlete	Event	Attempt 1	Attempt 2	Attempt 3	Attempt 1	Attempt 2	Attempt 3	Total	Rank
Odéus Bélizaire	85 kg	140	145	~~148~~	~~165~~	~~165~~	165	310	7th
