= Aya Shehata =

Egyptian taekwondo practitioner (born 2003)

Personal information
- Full name: Aya Mohamed Mahmoud Mohamed Shehata
- Born: 16 February 2003 (age 23)
- Weight: 67 kg (148 lb)

Sport
- Country: Egypt
- Sport: Taekwondo
- Event: –67 kg
Medal record
Women's taekwondo
Representing Egypt
World University Games
Silver medal – second place	2025 Rhine-Ruhr	Mixed team
African Games
Silver medal – second place	2023 Accra	Mixed team
Mediterranean Games
Bronze medal – third place	2022 Oran	67 kg

Aya Shehata (Arabic: آيَة شَحَّاتَة; born 16 February 2003) is an Egyptian taekwondo practitioner. She represented Egypt at the 2024 Summer Olympics.

== Career ==
She competed at the 2022 Mediterranean Games held in Oran, Algeria, and won a bronze medal in the women's 67 kg event.

She competed at the 2023 African Games in Accra, and won a silver medal in the mixed team event.

In February 2024, she competed at the 2024 African Qualification Tournament in Dakar, Senegal. She won her semifinal match and qualified to represent Egypt at the 2024 Summer Olympics. She competed in the women's 67 kg event and defeated Cecilia Castro in the round of 16 to advance to the quarterfinals.
