= Claudia Gallardo =

Chilean taekwondo practitioner

Personal information
- Full name: Claudia Rayen Gallardo Llancaman
- Born: 24 June 2000 (age 26)

Sport
- Country: Chile
- Sport: Taekwondo
- Weight class: 67 kg
Medal record
Women's taekwondo
Representing Chile
Pan American Games
Bronze medal – third place	2023 Santiago	67 kg
South American Games
Bronze medal – third place	2022 Asunción	67 kg
Bolivarian Games
Gold medal – first place	2022 Valledupar	67 kg

Claudia Rayen Gallardo Llancaman (born 24 June 2000) is a Chilean taekwondo practitioner. She won the gold medal in the women's +67 kg event at the 2022 Bolivarian Games in Valledupar, Colombia. She won one of the bronze medals in her event at the 2022 South American Games in Asunción, Paraguay.

== Career ==
In 2019, Gallardo competed in the women's lightweight event at the World Taekwondo Championships held in Manchester, United Kingdom. She also competed in the women's 67 kg event at the 2019 Pan American Games held in Lima, Peru. In 2020, she competed at the Pan American Olympic Qualification Tournament in Heredia, Costa Rica hoping to qualify for the 2020 Summer Olympics in Tokyo, Japan.

Gallardo competed in the women's welterweight event at the 2022 World Taekwondo Championships held in Guadalajara, Mexico. She also competed in the women's welterweight event at the 2023 World Taekwondo Championships held in Baku, Azerbaijan.

Gallardo competed at the 2024 Pan American Taekwondo Olympic Qualification Tournament in Santo Domingo, Dominican Republic hoping to qualify for the 2024 Summer Olympics in Paris, France.

== Achievements ==
Year	Event	Location	Place
2022	Bolivarian Games	Valledupar, Colombia	1st
2022	South American Games	Asunción, Paraguay	3rd
2023	Pan American Games	Santiago, Chile	3rd
