= Fani Tzeli =

Greek taekwondo practitioner

Personal information
- Nationality: Greek
- Born: 20 November 2001 (age 24)
- Height: 1.78 m (5 ft 10 in)
- Weight: 55 kg (121 lb)

Sport
- Country: Greece
- Sport: Taekwondo
Medal record
Women's taekwondo
Representing Greece
European Championships
Bronze medal – third place	2024 Belgrade	57 kg
World Junior Championships
Bronze medal – third place	2018 Hammamet	−55 kg
European Junior Championships
Bronze medal – third place	2017 Larnaca	−55 kg
Summer Youth Olympics
Bronze medal – third place	2018 Buenos Aires	−55 kg

Fani Tzeli (born 20 November 2001) is a Greek taekwondo athlete. She won a bronze medal for Greece at the 2017 European Taekwondo Junior Championships and another one at the 2017 World Taekwondo Junior Championships. In 2018, she participated at the 2018 Summer Youth Olympics where she came third, winning the bronze medal.
