= Luana Márton =

Hungarian taekwondo practitioner

Personal information
- Nationality: Hungarian
- Born: 16 February 2006 (age 20) Tenerife, Spain

Sport
- Country: Hungary
- Sport: Taekwondo
- Weight class: Featherweight
- Coached by: Suvi Mikkonen
Medal record
Women's taekwondo
Representing Hungary
World Championships
Gold medal – first place	2023 Baku	57 kg
Gold medal – first place	2025 Wuxi	67 kg
European Games
Silver medal – second place	2023 Kraków-Małopolska	57kg
European Championships
Silver medal – second place	2026 Munich	67 kg
Bronze medal – third place	2024 Belgrade	57 kg
European U21 Championships
Silver medal – second place	2023 Bucharest	62kg

Luana Márton (born 16 February 2006) is a Hungarian taekwondo practitioner. She is a two-time gold medalist at the World Taekwondo Championships.

== Early life ==
The daughter of Zsolt and Barbara Márton, her father formerly did kickboxing in Budapest and her mother played handball. Her parents moved to the Canary Islands in the early 2000s. She was born in Tenerife, and moved to Madrid in 2018.

== Career ==
She trains at the Hankuk club in Madrid and is coached by Finnish former Olympic Taekwondo practitioner Suvi Mikkonen, with their relationship starting after she met the twins when they were nine years old.

She won the open qualification tournament for the 2022 World Taekwondo Grand Slam Champions Series in Wuxi in March 2023 in the -57 kg category. In June of that year, she won a silver medal at the 2023 European Games in Kraków where she was beaten in the final by Jade Jones of Great Britain.

She won the gold medal in the Women's featherweight on her debut at the 2023 World Taekwondo Championships, in Baku, aged 17 years-old. In doing so, she became the first female Hungarian ever to win a world title in Taekwondo.

She was runner-up at the 2023 European U21 Taekwondo Championships 62 kg title in Bucharest in November 2023, being defeated by her sister Viviana in the final.

She won a bronze medal in the women's -73 kg category at the British Taekwondo International Open in Manchester in March 2025 and the 2025 Belgian Open that month. In October 2025, she won second world title, claiming the gold medal at the 2025 World Taekwondo Championships in the welterweight division.

In May 2026, she was a silver medalist at the 2026 European Taekwondo Championships in Munich, Germany having faced Styliani Marentaki of Greece in the final.

== Personal life ==
She has a twin sister, Viviana Márton, who also competes international in Taekwondo, and was a gold medalist at the 2024 Olympic Games.
