= Elizabeth Anyanacho =

Nigerian taekwondo practitioner

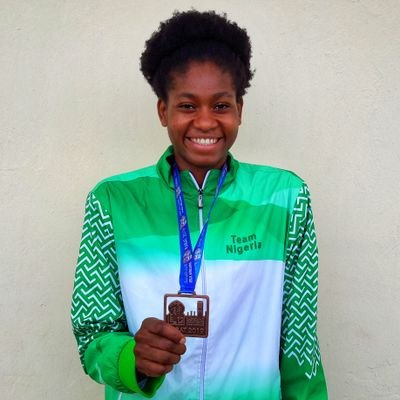
- Anyanacho in 2021

Personal information
- Full name: Elizabeth Oluchi Anyanacho
- Nationality: Nigerian
- Born: April 9, 1999 (age 27)
- Years active: 2019-present

Sport
- Country: Nigeria
- Sport: taekwondo
- Weight class: 67 kg (148 lb)
Medal record
Women's taekwondo
Representing Nigeria
World Championships
Bronze medal – third place	2025 Wuxi	67 kg
African Games
Gold medal – first place	2023 Accra	–67 kg
Bronze medal – third place	2019 Rabat	–67 kg
Bronze medal – third place	2023 Accra	Mixed team
Islamic Solidarity Games
Bronze medal – third place	2025 Riyadh	70 kg

Elizabeth Anyanacho (born 9 April 1999) is a Nigerian taekwondo athlete.

== Career ==
She won the 2019 Nigeria Open in Abuja, defeating Judith Usifoh.

In August 2020, she was featured in the Malala Fund's "Game Changers" project, a series featuring 30 female athletes worldwide who defy convention on and off the field.

She participated at the 2019 African Games, winning a bronze medal at 67 kg. She qualified for the 2020 Summer Olympics, although she had not intended to compete at the Olympics until 2024. She would have been the first Nigerian to compete in her sport for 16 years if the Olympics had not been postponed. The previous competitor was Princess Dudu in 2004.
