= Kim Yu-jin (taekwondo, born 2000) =

South Korean taekwondo practitioner (born 2000)

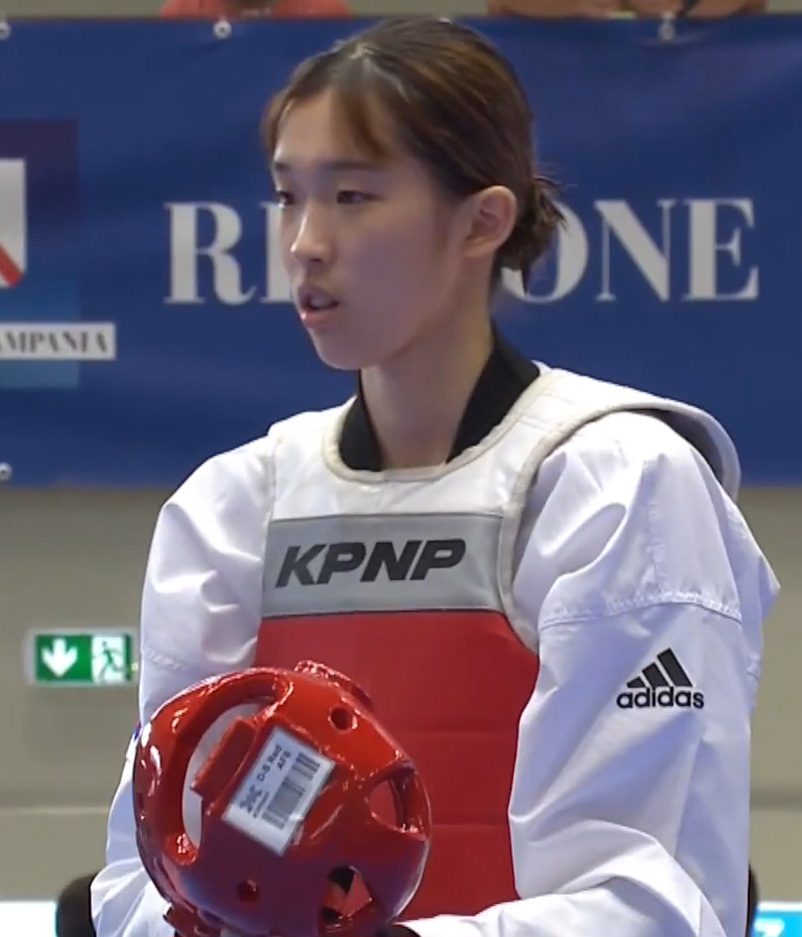
- Kim in 2019
- Born: 17 October 2000 (age 26); Danyang, South Korea
- Native name: 김유진
- Height: 183 cm (6 ft 0 in)
- Weight: 57 kg (126 lb; 9 st 0 lb)
- Style: Taekwondo
- Last updated on: 24 May 2026

Kim Yu-jin (Korean: 김유진; born 17 October 2000) is a South Korean taekwondo practitioner. She is the reigning Olympic champion and gold medalist at the 2024 Summer Olympics in women's 57 kg taekwondo.

== Career ==
She won gold at the World Junior Taekwondo Championships in Burnaby, Canada, in 2016.

She won the gold medal in the 57 kg division at the 2019 Summer World University Games in Naples. She went on to retain her title in the 57 kg division at the 2021 Summer World University Games in Chengdu. Competing at the 2021 Asian Taekwondo Championships she won the gold medal in the 57 kg category in Beirut.

She was a bronze medalist at the delayed 2022 Asian Games in Hangzhou in September 2023, in the Women's 57 kg.

At the 2024 Summer Olympics, she defeated four of the top five athletes in her weight class and Iranian taekwondo artist Nahid Kiani, and won the gold medal for the women's 57 kg category for taekwondo. Kim's gold medal win also gave South Korea its 13th gold medal at the 2024 Summer Olympics, tying the country's previous Summer Olympic gold medal records which were set in 2008 and 2012.

She was a silver medalist at the 2025 World Taekwondo Championships in Wuxi, China, where she was defeated by Maria Clara Pacheco of Brazil 2-0 in the final.
