= Leslie Soltero =

Mexican taekwondo practitioner

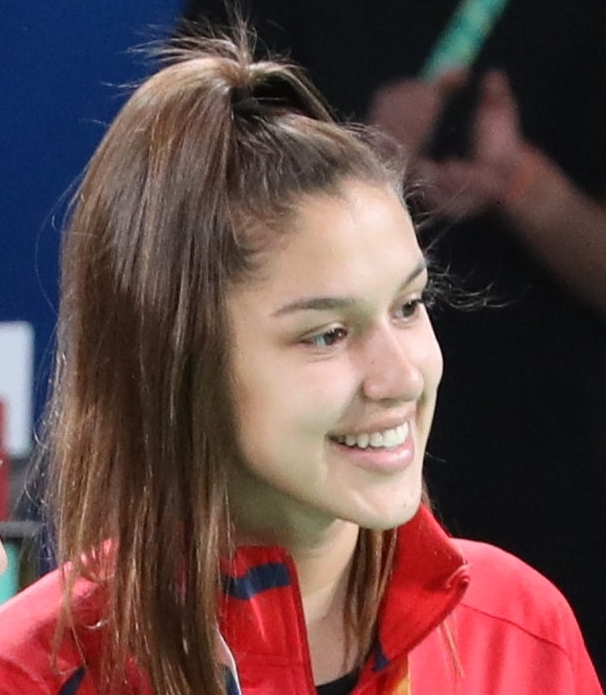
- Soltero in 2018

Personal information
- Full name: Leslie Xcaret Soltero García
- Born: 30 April 2001 (age 25)

Sport
- Country: Mexico
- Sport: Taekwondo
- Weight class: 67 kg
Medal record
Women's taekwondo
Representing Mexico
World Championships
Gold medal – first place	2022 Guadalajara	67 kg
Pan American Games
Gold medal – first place	2023 Santiago	67 kg
Grand Prix
Bronze medal – third place	Paris 2022	67 kg
Pan American Championships
Silver medal – second place	2022 Punta Cana	67 kg
Bronze medal – third place	2021 Cancún	67 kg
Junior Pan American Games
Gold medal – first place	2021 Cali-Valle	67 kg
Summer Youth Olympics
Bronze medal – third place	2018 Buenos Aires	63 kg

Leslie Xcaret Soltero García (Note: In this Spanish name, the first or paternal surname is Soltero and the second or maternal family name is García.) (born 30 April 2001) is a Mexican taekwondo practitioner. She won the gold medal in the women's welterweight event at the 2022 World Taekwondo Championships held in Guadalajara, Mexico. She also won the gold medal in her event at the 2023 Pan American Games held in Santiago, Chile.

Soltero won one of the bronze medals in the girls' 63 kg event at the 2018 Summer Youth Olympics held in Buenos Aires, Argentina. She also won one of the bronze medals in the women's 67 kg event at the 2021 Pan American Taekwondo Championships held in Cancún, Mexico.

Soltero won the gold medal in her event at the 2021 Junior Pan American Games held in Cali, Colombia.

She won the silver medal in her event at the 2022 Pan American Taekwondo Championships held in Punta Cana, Dominican Republic.

Soltero competed at the 2024 Pan American Taekwondo Olympic Qualification Tournament in Santo Domingo, Dominican Republic hoping to qualify for the 2024 Summer Olympics in Paris, France.
