= Vanessa Körndl =

German taekwondo practitioner

Personal information
- Nationality: German
- Born: 23 June 1997 (age 29)

Sport
- Country: Germany
- Sport: Taekwondo
- Event(s): –67 kg, –73 kg
- Club: Tiger and Dragon Altmannstein/Mindelstetten
- Team: GER
- Turned pro: 2018
- Coached by: Bernhard Bruckbauer
Medal record
Women's taekwondo
Representing Germany
Military World Games
Silver medal – second place	2019 Wuhan	73 kg
World Military Championships
Gold medal – first place	2024 Mungyeong	67 kg
Gold medal – first place	2025 Warendorf	67 kg
Silver medal – second place	2018 Rio de Janeiro	67 kg
European Championships
Bronze medal – third place	2019 Dublin	67 kg
World Juniors Championships
Silver medal – second place	2014 Taipei	63 kg
- Updated on 26 June 2025

Vanessa Körndl (born 23 June 1997) is a German taekwondo athlete. She is a two-time World Military Champion and silver medalist at the Military World Games.

== Career ==
Vanessa Körndl participated in her first major international tournament for the German national team in 2014. That year, she won a silver medal at the world juniors championships in Taipei.

Körndl is a silver medalist in the women's under 67 kg category at the 2018 World Military Taekwondo Championships in Rio de Janeiro as well as in the under 73 kg category at the 2019 World Military Summer Games in Wuhan.

She won a bronze medal in the under 67 kg category at the 2019 European Championships in the Olympic Weight Categories in Dublin, as well as at the 2021 Women's World Taekwondo Championships in Riyadh.

In 2024, Körndl became military world champion in the 67 kg class in Mungyeong. She defended this title in the year following in Warendorf.

== Personal life ==
Körndl is a Soldier-Athlete (German: Sportsoldat) and trains alongside fellow national team athlete Lorena Brandl.
