= Matea Jelić =

Croatian taekwondo practitioner

Personal information
- Nickname: Matea Jelić
- Born: 23 December 1997 (age 28) Knin, Croatia
- Height: 183 cm (6 ft 0 in)

Sport
- Country: Croatia
- Sport: Taekwondo
- Event: 67 kg
- Club: Marjan TK
- Coached by: Toni Tomas
Medal record
Representing Croatia
Women's taekwondo
Olympic Games
Gold medal – first place	2020 Tokyo	67 kg
World Championships
Bronze medal – third place	2023 Baku	73 kg
Grand Slam
Gold medal – first place	2019 Wuxi	67 kg
Grand Prix
Gold medal – first place	2018 Moscow	67 kg
Gold medal – first place	2019 Rome	67 kg
Silver medal – second place	2019 Moscow (F)	67 kg
Silver medal – second place	2018 Manchester	67 kg
Silver medal – second place	2019 Chiba	67 kg
Bronze medal – third place	2018 Fujairah (F)	67 kg
Bronze medal – third place	2017 London	67 kg
European Championships
Gold medal – first place	2021 Sofia	67 kg
Bronze medal – third place	2016 Montreux	67 kg
Bronze medal – third place	2024 Belgrade	73 kg
Mediterranean Games
Gold medal – first place	2018 Tarragona	67 kg
Gold medal – first place	2022 Oran	67 kg
World Junior Championships
Gold medal – first place	2014 Taipei	63 kg

Matea Jelić (born 23 December 1997) is a Croatian taekwondo athlete. She is the 2020 Olympic champion in 67 kg.

She won the gold medal in the women's 67 kg event at the 2022 Mediterranean Games held in Oran, Algeria.

In 2023, she won one of the bronze medals in the women's middleweight event at the World Taekwondo Championships held in Baku, Azerbaijan.
