= Magda Wiet-Hénin =

French taekwondo practitioner

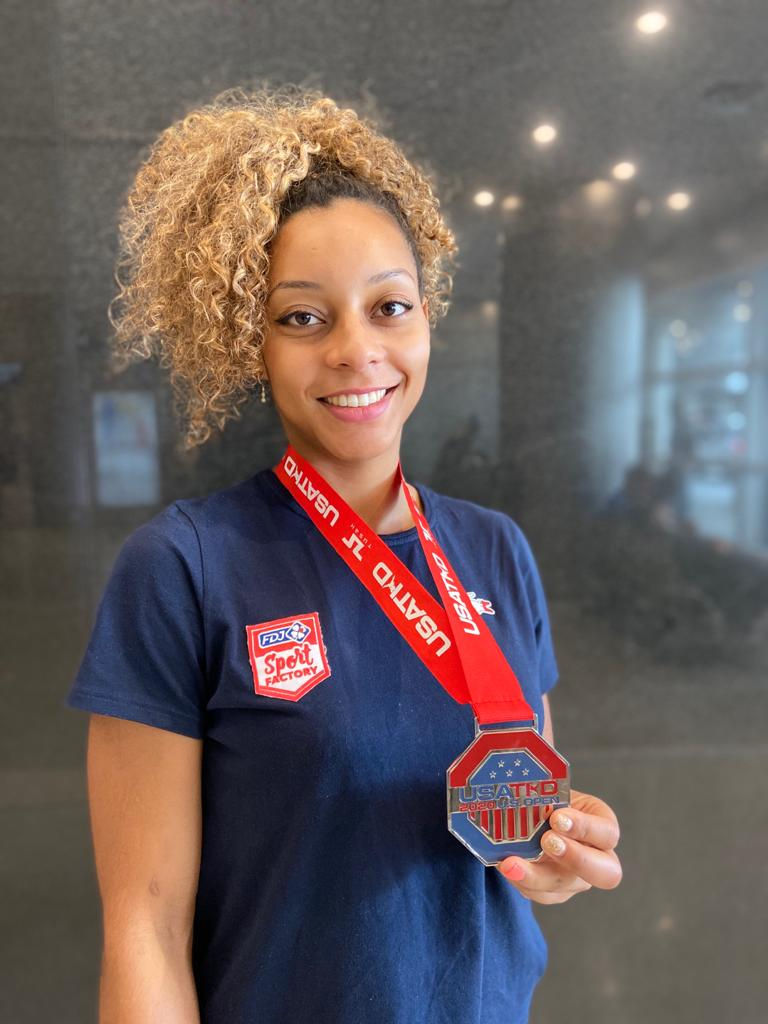
- Wiet-Hénin in 2020

Personal information
- Nationality: French
- Born: 31 August 1995 (age 31) Nancy, France
- Height: 173 cm (5 ft 8 in)

Sport
- Country: France
- Sport: Taekwondo
- Event: 62 kg (lightweight)
Medal record
Women's taekwondo
Representing France
World Championships
Gold medal – first place	2023 Baku	67 kg
Bronze medal – third place	2019 Manchester	62 kg
Grand Prix
Gold medal – first place	2019 Chiba	67 kg
Gold medal – first place	2022 Rome	67 kg
Gold medal – first place	2022 Manchester	67 kg
Silver medal – second place	2018 Rome	67 kg
Bronze medal – third place	2019 Rome	67 kg
Bronze medal – third place	2022 Riyadh (F)	67 kg
European Games
Bronze medal – third place	2023 Kraków-Małopolska	67 kg
European Championships
Silver medal – second place	2016 Montreux	62 kg
Silver medal – second place	2022 Manchester	67 kg
Silver medal – second place	2024 Belgrade	67 kg
Bronze medal – third place	2014 Baku	62 kg
Bronze medal – third place	2021 Sofia	67 kg
Bronze medal – third place	2026 Munich	73 kg
Mediterranean Games
Bronze medal – third place	2022 Oran	67 kg
European U21 Championships
Silver medal – second place	2012 Athens	62 kg
World Junior Championships
Gold medal – first place	2012 Sharm El Sheikh	59 kg
European Junior Championships
Silver medal – second place	2011 Pafos	59 kg

Magda Wiet-Hénin (born 31 August 1995) is a French taekwondo athlete. She won the silver medal at the 2018 European Taekwondo Championships. She has qualified to the 2020 Summer Olympics through the 2021 European Taekwondo Olympic Qualification Tournament.

She won one of the bronze medals in the women's 67 kg event at the 2022 Mediterranean Games held in Oran, Algeria.

== Personal life ==
Wiet-Hénin is the daughter of Valérie Hénin and Orlando Wiet.
