= Cecilia Castro =

Spanish taekwondo practitioner

Personal information
- Born: Cecilia Castro Burgos; 21 June 1997 (age 29)

Sport
- Country: Spain
- Sport: Taekwondo
Medal record
Women's taekwondo
Representing Spain
World Championships
Bronze medal – third place	2022 Guadalajara	67 kg
European Games
Silver medal – second place	2023 Kraków-Małopolska	67 kg
European Championships
Gold medal – first place	2022 Manchester	67 kg
Bronze medal – third place	2018 Kazan	73 kg
Mediterranean Games
Silver medal – second place	2022 Oran	67 kg

Cecilia Castro Burgos (Note: In this Spanish name, the first or paternal surname is Castro and the second or maternal family name is Burgos.) (born 21 June 1997) is a Spanish taekwondo practitioner. She won one of the bronze medals in the women's welterweight event at the 2022 World Taekwondo Championships held in Guadalajara, Mexico. She won the gold medal in her event at the 2022 European Taekwondo Championships held in Manchester, United Kingdom.

She represented Spain at the 2022 Mediterranean Games held in Oran, Algeria. She won the silver medal in the women's 67 kg event. She also represented Spain at the 2018 Mediterranean Games held in Tarragona, Spain.

She competed in the women's welterweight event at the 2023 World Taekwondo Championships held in Baku, Azerbaijan.
