= Ozoda Sobirjonova =

Uzbek taekwondo practitioner (born 2002)

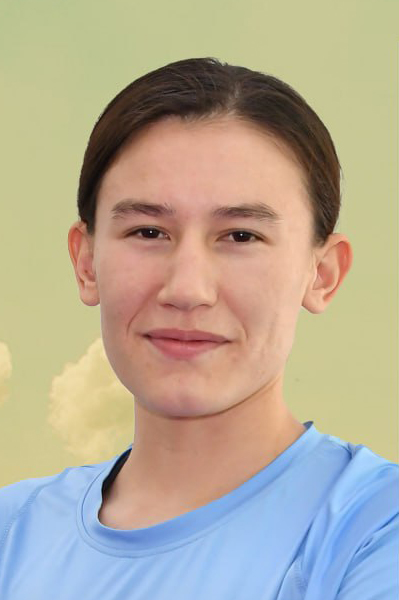

Personal information
- Born: 7 December 2002 (age 23) Djizak, Uzbekistan

Sport
- Sport: Taekwondo
Medal record
Women's taekwondo
Representing Uzbekistan
Asian Championships
Gold medal – first place	2026 Ulaanbaatar	67 kg
Asian Games
Silver medal – second place	2026 Aichi-Nagoya	67 kg
Bronze medal – third place	2022 Hangzhou	Mixed team
Islamic Solidarity Games
Gold medal – first place	2025 Riyadh	70 kg

Ozoda Sobirjonova (born 7 December 2002) is an Uzbek taekwondo practitioner. She was a bronze medalist at the 2022 Asian Games and qualified for the 2024 Olympic Games.

== Early life ==
She is from the Zomin district of the Jizzakh Region. She began to be a member of the Uzbekistan national team age-group taekwondo teams in 2017. She won a silver medal at the 2018 World Taekwondo Junior Championships in Hammemet, Tunisia.

== Career ==
She was a bronze medalist at the 2022 Asian Games in the mixed team event. She won a silver medal in the 2023 World Cup Taekwondo Team Championships.

She entered the 2024 Asian Taekwondo Olympic Qualification Tournament and earned a place at the upcoming Olympic Games. She was subsequently officially selected for the 2024 Summer Olympics in Paris.
