= 2022 World Taekwondo Championships – Women's middleweight =

Taekwondo competitions

Women's middleweight at the 2022 World Championships
- Venue: Centro Acuático CODE Metropolitano
- Dates: 19 November 2022
- Competitors: 34 from 34 nations

Medalists
gold medal	Nadica Božanić	Serbia
silver medal	Lee Da-bin	South Korea
bronze medal	Crystal Weekes	Puerto Rico
bronze medal	Rebecca McGowan	Great Britain

The women's middleweight is a competition featured at the 2022 World Taekwondo Championships, and was held at the Centro Acuático CODE Metropolitano in Guadalajara, Mexico on 19 November 2022. Middleweights were limited to a maximum of 73 kilograms in body mass.

== Results ==
Legend

- DQ — Won by disqualification

=== Finals ===
Semifinals			Final
Lee Da-bin (KOR)	4	7
Crystal Weekes (PUR)	0	2	Lee Da-bin (KOR)	8	3
Rebecca McGowan (GBR)	6	2	Nadica Božanić (SRB)	12	9
Nadica Božanić (SRB)	8	6

=== Top half ===
==== Section 1 ====
Round of 64
~~Fatima Salifou (NIG)~~
Aliyah Shipman (HAI)	D	Q

Round of 32
Althéa Laurin (FRA)	4	5
Aliyah Shipman (HAI)	3	2
Reshmie Oogink (CAO)	0	8	10
Ward Selman (LBN)	4	2	3
Lee Da-bin (KOR)	13	12
Martín de la Cruz (DOM)	0	0
Yosselyn Molina (HON)	0	1
Zhou Zeqi (CHN)	8	10

Round of 16
Althéa Laurin (FRA)	7	5
Reshmie Oogink (CAO)	0	3
Lee Da-bin (KOR)	6	11
Zhou Zeqi (CHN)	4	8

Quarterfinals
Althéa Laurin (FRA)	2	4
Lee Da-bin (KOR)	2	9

==== Section 2 ====
Round of 64

Round of 32
Yanna Schneider (GER)	7	14
Rachel Cuma (CAN)	2	5
Belén Morán (ESP)	5	3	2
Nika Klepac (CRO)	7	2	5
Urgence Mouega (GAB)	1	4	0
Crystal Weekes (PUR)	2	3	3
~~Florence Eldjouma (CHA)~~
Alexia Ramírez (MEX)	D	Q

Round of 16
Yanna Schneider (GER)	1	3
Nika Klepac (CRO)	4	7
Crystal Weekes (PUR)	2	5
Alexia Ramírez (MEX)	2	4

Quarterfinals
Nika Klepac (CRO)	0	0
Crystal Weekes (PUR)	7	4

=== Bottom half ===
==== Section 3 ====
Round of 64

Round of 32
Rebecca McGowan (GBR)	7	0
Cai Nian-en (TPE)	1	0
Paraskevi Ntemogianni (GRE)	2	1
Raphaella Galacho (BRA)	4	4
Maisoun Farouk (EGY)	7	9
Trần Nguyễn Ánh Ngân (VIE)	0	4
Katja Medd (AUS)	2	0
Rama Abu Al-Rub (JOR)	8	11

Round of 16
Rebecca McGowan (GBR)	1	6
Raphaella Galacho (BRA)	0	0
Maisoun Farouk (EGY)	1	3	0
Rama Abu Al-Rub (JOR)	0	8	2

Quarterfinals
Rebecca McGowan (GBR)	4	14
Rama Abu Al-Rub (JOR)	2	2

==== Section 4 ====
Round of 64
Jessica Dangnide (CIV)	3	2
Saodat Alieva (UZB)	4	9

Round of 32
Madelynn Gorman-Shore (USA)	2	3
Carolina Fernández (VEN)	1	2
Sude Yaren Uzunçavdar (TUR)	2	5
Nadica Božanić (SRB)	7	7
Maristella Smiraglia (ITA)	D	Q
~~Everlyn Aluoch Oloo (KEN)~~
Saodat Alieva (UZB)	0	0
Cansel Deniz (KAZ)	2	2

Round of 16
Madelynn Gorman-Shore (USA)	3	13	2
Nadica Božanić (SRB)	9	10	3
Maristella Smiraglia (ITA)	4	6	5
Cansel Deniz (KAZ)	4	2	6

Quarterfinals
Nadica Božanić (SRB)	15	8
Cansel Deniz (KAZ)	3	8
