= 2023 World Taekwondo Championships – Women's heavyweight =

Taekwondo competitions

Women's heavyweight at the 2023 World Championships
- Venue: Baku Crystal Hall
- Dates: 1 June 2023
- Competitors: 31 from 30 nations

Medalists
gold medal	Nafia Kuş	Turkey
silver medal	Svetlana Osipova	Uzbekistan
bronze medal	Bianca Cook	Great Britain
bronze medal	Kristina Adebaio	Individual Neutral Athletes

The women's heavyweight is a competition featured at the 2023 World Taekwondo Championships, and was held at the Baku Crystal Hall in Baku, Azerbaijan on 1 June 2023.

Heavyweights were limited to a minimum of 73 kilograms in body mass.

Nafia Kuş from Turkey won the gold medal.

== Results ==
Legend

- P — Won by punitive declaration
- W — Won by withdrawal

=== Final ===
Final
Svetlana Osipova (UZB)	0	11	4
Nafia Kuş (TUR)	0	6	7

=== Top half ===
Round of 32
Pan Yun-ci (TPE)	9	4
Carolina Fernández (VEN)	4	1
Solène Avoulète (FRA)	5^{P}	4
Kalina Boyadzhieva (BUL)	7	3
Zhou Zeqi (CHN)	9	11
Dana Azran (ISR)	4	5
Aleksandra Kowalczuk (POL)	10	10
Rakoni Bimyrza (KAZ)	3	7
Astan Bathily (CIV)	1	1
Fatima-Ezzahra Aboufaras (MAR)	5	4
Hannah Keck (USA)	3	2
Rachel Fountain (CAN)	0	2
Alessandra Ilic (ITA)	1	3
Svetlana Osipova (UZB)	8	9

Round of 16
Bianca Cook (GBR)	3	7
Pan Yun-ci (TPE)	2	7
Solène Avoulète (FRA)	1	5	3
Zhou Zeqi (CHN)	1	6	3
Aleksandra Kowalczuk (POL)	5	9
Fatima-Ezzahra Aboufaras (MAR)	9	13
Hannah Keck (USA)
Svetlana Osipova (UZB)	W

Quarterfinals
Bianca Cook (GBR)	4	2
Solène Avoulète (FRA)	2	1
Fatima-Ezzahra Aboufaras (MAR)	0	11	7
Svetlana Osipova (UZB)	1	9	8

Semifinals
Bianca Cook (GBR)	3	3
Svetlana Osipova (UZB)	3	4

=== Bottom half ===
Round of 32
Nafia Kuş (TUR)	15	10
Paraskevi Ntemogianni (GRE)	5	0
Rodali Barua (IND)	1	8	1
Reba Stewart (AUS)	3	5	3
Gloria Mosquera (COL)	0	5
Ana Tepavac (SRB)	0	5
Aliyah Shipman (HAI)	4	9	13
Gabriele Siqueira (BRA)	9	8	11
Marlene Jahl (AUT)	13	12
Carlota Munave (SWZ)	1	0
Song Da-bin (KOR)	2	5
Tania Castiñeira (ESP)	2	1
Paloma García (MEX)	8	4
Kristina Adebaio (AIN)	10	8
Nika Klepac (CRO)	6	6
Lorena Brandl (GER)	1	3

Round of 16
Nafia Kuş (TUR)	7	7
Reba Stewart (AUS)	0	5
Gloria Mosquera (COL)	7	14
Aliyah Shipman (HAI)	0	1
Marlene Jahl (AUT)	6	4	5
Song Da-bin (KOR)	3	9	4
Kristina Adebaio (AIN)	6	5
Nika Klepac (CRO)	4	1

Quarterfinals
Nafia Kuş (TUR)	3	3	7
Gloria Mosquera (COL)	8	2	1
Marlene Jahl (AUT)	1	4
Kristina Adebaio (AIN)	4	7

Semifinals
Nafia Kuş (TUR)	5	5	6
Kristina Adebaio (AIN)	0	12	1
