= 2019 World Taekwondo Championships – Women's middleweight =

Women's middleweight at the 2019 World Championships
- Venue: Manchester Arena
- Dates: 15–16 May 2019
- Competitors: 30 from 30 nations

Medalists
gold medal	Lee Da-bin	South Korea
silver medal	María Espinoza	Mexico
bronze medal	Marie-Paule Blé	France
bronze medal	Nafia Kuş	Turkey

The women's middleweight is a competition featured at the 2019 World Taekwondo Championships, and was held at the Manchester Arena in Manchester, United Kingdom on 15 and 16 May.

Middleweights were limited to a maximum of 73 kilograms in body mass.

Espinoza, three times Olympic medalist faced twenty-two years old Lee Da-bin from South Korea in the final who had never competed in a World Championships before. A body shot for Lee gave her an early 2–0 lead. Espinoza responded with a punch but Lee scored few more points to finish the first round 7–1. Lee carried on where she left off at the start of the second to finish it 14–2. In the third round Lee maintained her intensity and landed a number of shots to the body and head shots to win her first ever World Championships 22–2.

== Results ==
=== Final ===
Final
Lee Da-bin (KOR)	22
María Espinoza (MEX)	2

=== Top half ===
Round of 32
Sorn Seavmey (CAM)	5
Maristella Smiraglia (ITA)	15
Marie-Paule Blé (FRA)	21
Lui Yee Ting (HKG)	0
Guo Yunfei (CHN)	7
Iva Radoš (CRO)	3
Karina Zhdanova (RUS)	6
Paloma Lima (BRA)	3
Glenhis Hernández (CUB)	0
Lee Da-bin (KOR)	21
Reshmie Oogink (NED)	12
Souzanna Tomazou (CYP)	9
Laura Ayala (COL)	3
Rebecca McGowan (GBR)	18

Round of 16
Milica Mandić (SRB)	8
Maristella Smiraglia (ITA)	3
Marie-Paule Blé (FRA)	3
Guo Yunfei (CHN)	2
Karina Zhdanova (RUS)	5
Lee Da-bin (KOR)	25
Reshmie Oogink (NED)	13
Rebecca McGowan (GBR)	20

Quarterfinals
Milica Mandić (SRB)	5
Marie-Paule Blé (FRA)	6
Lee Da-bin (KOR)	28
Rebecca McGowan (GBR)	2

Semifinals
Marie-Paule Blé (FRA)	10
Lee Da-bin (KOR)	15

=== Bottom half ===
Round of 32
Madelynn Gorman-Shore (USA)	22
Camila Orihuela (PER)	0
Evgenia Sarri (GRE)	11
Crystal Weekes (PUR)	9
Alema Hadžić (GER)	9
Eliza Haugen (NOR)	11
Hanna Stepanets (UKR)	1
Nafia Kuş (TUR)	22
Cansel Deniz (KAZ)	25
Akram Khodabandeh (IRI)	20
Astan Bathily (CIV)	1
Cecilia Castro (ESP)	6
Nathalie Iliesco (CAN)	3
Ma Ting-hsia (TPE)	6

Round of 16
Madelynn Gorman-Shore (USA)	10
Evgenia Sarri (GRE)	3
Eliza Haugen (NOR)	0
Nafia Kuş (TUR)	5
Cansel Deniz (KAZ)	0
Cecilia Castro (ESP)	22
Ma Ting-hsia (TPE)	4
María Espinoza (MEX)	7

Quarterfinals
Madelynn Gorman-Shore (USA)	4
Nafia Kuş (TUR)	5
Cecilia Castro (ESP)	5
María Espinoza (MEX)	6

Semifinals
Nafia Kuş (TUR)	4
María Espinoza (MEX)	6
