= 2022 World Taekwondo Championships – Women's heavyweight =

Taekwondo competitions

Women's heavyweight at the 2022 World Championships
- Venue: Centro Acuático CODE Metropolitano
- Dates: 17 November 2022
- Competitors: 24 from 24 nations

Medalists
gold medal	Svetlana Osipova	Uzbekistan
silver medal	Dana Azran	Israel
bronze medal	Lorena Brandl	Germany
bronze medal	Marlene Jahl	Austria

The women's heavyweight is a competition featured at the 2022 World Taekwondo Championships, and was held at the Acuático Code Metropolitano in Guadalajara, Mexico on 17 November 2022. Heavyweights were limited to a minimum of 73 kilograms in body mass.

Svetlana Osipova from Uzbekistan won the gold medal.

== Results ==
Legend

- DQ — Won by disqualification
- W — Won by withdrawal

=== Final ===
Final
Dana Azran (ISR)	3	5	0
Svetlana Osipova (UZB)	3	6	0

=== Top half ===
Round of 32
~~Faith Ogallo (KEN)~~
Akram Khodabandeh (IRI)	D	Q
Tania Castiñeira (ESP)	2	0
Pan Yun-ci (TPE)	3	2
Astan Bathily (CIV)	0	4	1
Dana Azran (ISR)	2	3	2
Reba Stewart (AUS)	1	2
Matea Kolovrat (CRO)	2	5

Round of 16
Lorena Brandl (GER)	11	3
Akram Khodabandeh (IRI)	4	1
Pan Yun-ci (TPE)	7	5	2
Gabriele Siqueira (BRA)	5	6	2
Solène Avoulète (FRA)	0	2	1
Dana Azran (ISR)	6	0	1
Matea Kolovrat (CRO)	3	0
Paloma García (MEX)	1	3^{W}

Quarterfinals
Lorena Brandl (GER)	3	7
Gabriele Siqueira (BRA)	0	3
Dana Azran (ISR)	4	4
Paloma García (MEX)	0	1

Semifinals
Lorena Brandl (GER)	2	0
Dana Azran (ISR)	2	1

=== Bottom half ===
Round of 32
Agoritsa Kitsiou (GRE)	7	4
Fatima-Ezzahra Aboufaras (MAR)	16	10
Katherine Rodríguez (DOM)	0	0
Alena Viana (USA)	0	0
Rachel Fountain (CAN)	2	0
Marlene Jahl (AUT)	8	9
Xu Lei (CHN)	0	4	1
Kim Hyo-jung (KOR)	3	1	1

Round of 16
Aleksandra Kowalczuk (POL)	7	7	1
Fatima-Ezzahra Aboufaras (MAR)	4	7	1
Alena Viana (USA)	2	0
Svetlana Osipova (UZB)	4	3
Gloria Mosquera (COL)	1	15	2
Marlene Jahl (AUT)	3	6	3
Xu Lei (CHN)	3	0	3
Nafia Kuş (TUR)	2	3	4

Quarterfinals
Fatima-Ezzahra Aboufaras (MAR)	1	1
Svetlana Osipova (UZB)	3	1
Marlene Jahl (AUT)	1	3	6
Nafia Kuş (TUR)	1	3	3

Semifinals
Svetlana Osipova (UZB)	3	0	5
Marlene Jahl (AUT)	4	0	2
