= 2023 World Taekwondo Championships – Women's middleweight =

World Taekwondo competitions

Women's middleweight at the 2023 World Championships
- Venue: Baku Crystal Hall
- Dates: 30 May 2023
- Competitors: 33 from 32 nations

Medalists
gold medal	Althéa Laurin	France
silver medal	Rebecca McGowan	Great Britain
bronze medal	Matea Jelić	Croatia
bronze medal	Polina Khan	Individual Neutral Athletes

The women's middleweight is a competition featured at the 2023 World Taekwondo Championships, and was held at the Baku Crystal Hall in Baku, Azerbaijan on 30 May 2023. Middleweights were limited to a maximum of 73 kilograms in body mass.

== Results ==
=== Finals ===
Semifinals			Final
Matea Jelić (CRO)	5	8
Rebecca McGowan (GBR)	7	9	Rebecca McGowan (GBR)	10	5
Polina Khan (AIN)	0	2	Althéa Laurin (FRA)	16	9
Althéa Laurin (FRA)	1	10

=== Top half ===
==== Section 1 ====
Round of 64
Etisha Das (IND)	3	5
Sofie Nicholson (CAN)	15	7

Round of 32
Nadica Božanić (SRB)	1	7
Sofie Nicholson (CAN)	0	2
Matea Jelić (CRO)	3	1	0
Sude Yaren Uzunçavdar (TUR)	1	2	0
Maisoun Farouk (EGY)	2	2	1
Ava Lee (HAI)	1	3	0
Cai Nian-en (TPE)	3	9	8
Madelynn Gorman-Shore (USA)	7	6	9

Round of 16
Nadica Božanić (SRB)	0	4
Matea Jelić (CRO)	11	6
Maisoun Farouk (EGY)	2	1	8
Madelynn Gorman-Shore (USA)	2	2	1

Quarterfinals
Matea Jelić (CRO)	4	7
Maisoun Farouk (EGY)	0	3

==== Section 2 ====
Round of 64

Round of 32
Rebecca McGowan (GBR)	9	10
Song Jie (CHN)	8	8
Rebeka Füredi (HUN)	8	3
Crystal Weekes (PUR)	3	2
Maristella Smiraglia (ITA)	3	5	4
Zahra Pouresmaeil (IRI)	4	3	3
Anđela Berišaj (MNE)	1	3
Lee Da-bin (KOR)	6	4

Round of 16
Rebecca McGowan (GBR)	5	5
Rebeka Füredi (HUN)	0	2
Maristella Smiraglia (ITA)	5	5
Lee Da-bin (KOR)	0	4

Quarterfinals
Rebecca McGowan (GBR)	8	5
Maristella Smiraglia (ITA)	5	3

=== Bottom half ===
==== Section 3 ====
Round of 64

Round of 32
Cansel Deniz (KAZ)	10	7
Anastasia Delidimitri (GRE)	2	0
Belén Morán (ESP)	4	18
Ward Selman (LBN)	3	5
Polina Khan (AIN)	4	6
Emily Stellino (AUS)	2	3
Saodat Alieva (UZB)	4	6
Yanna Schneider (GER)	12	12

Round of 16
Cansel Deniz (KAZ)	6	5
Belén Morán (ESP)	0	0
Polina Khan (AIN)	3	1	11
Yanna Schneider (GER)	3	2	4

Quarterfinals
Cansel Deniz (KAZ)	2	1	4
Polina Khan (AIN)	0	3	6

==== Section 4 ====
Round of 64

Round of 32
Rama Abu Al-Rub (JOR)	6	14
Jessica Dangnide (CIV)	4	5
Thaisa Souza (BRA)	0	6
Urgence Mouega (GAB)	1	16
Omaima Boumah (MAR)	6	4	7
Victoria Heredia (MEX)	7	1	1
Sara Vital (POR)	0	1
Althéa Laurin (FRA)	7	13

Round of 16
Rama Abu Al-Rub (JOR)	6	3	6
Urgence Mouega (GAB)	4	3	1
Omaima Boumah (MAR)	2	0	0
Althéa Laurin (FRA)	0	4	4

Quarterfinals
Rama Abu Al-Rub (JOR)	2	0
Althéa Laurin (FRA)	5	8
