= Taekwondo at the 2024 Summer Olympics – Women's +67 kg =

Women's +67 kg at the Games of the XXXIII Olympiad
- Venue: Grand Palais
- Date: 10 August 2024
- Competitors: 16 from 16 nations

Medalists
1st place, gold medalist(s)		Althéa Laurin	France
2nd place, silver medalist(s)		Svetlana Osipova	Uzbekistan
3rd place, bronze medalist(s)		Lee Da-bin	South Korea
3rd place, bronze medalist(s)		Nafia Kuş	Turkey

The women's +67 kg competition in Taekwondo at the 2024 Summer Olympics was held on 10 August 2024 at the Grand Palais.

== Summary ==
This is the seventh appearance of the women's super heavyweight category.

Defending champion Milica Mandić did not participate in this edition as she retired from taekwondo shortly after the Tokyo 2020 Games, Lee Da-bin won by beating Petra Štolbová 6-7, then Zhou Zeqi 14F-16, and lost to potentially silver medalist Svetlana Osipova, later, Lee got into the bronze medal match A and won by beating Lorena Brandl, one of the bronze medalists, Althéa Laurin became the eventual champion, and Bianca Walkden did not qualify.

== Results ==
=== Gold medal match ===
Gold medal match
4	Althéa Laurin (FRA)	3	3
6	Svetlana Osipova (UZB)	0	3

=== Repechage ===
Repechage				Bronze Medal
				2	Lee Da-bin (KOR)	4	5	13
				5	Lorena Brandl (GER)	2	9	2
5	Lorena Brandl (GER)	8	15	5	Lorena Brandl (GER)	2	9	2
13	Munira Abdusalomova (TJK)	1	4

Repechage				Bronze Medal
11	Astan Bathily (CIV)	0	0
3	Rebecca McGowan (GBR)	1	2
3	Rebecca McGowan (GBR)	1	2	3	Rebecca McGowan (GBR)	9	2	2
				1	Nafia Kuş (TUR)	7	4	6

=== Main bracket ===
==== Pool A ====
Round of 16
13	Munira Abdusalomova (TJK)	0	0
4	Althéa Laurin (FRA)	3	12
5	Lorena Brandl (GER)	0	1
12	Arlettys Acosta (CUB)	0	0
9	Rama Abu Al-Rub (JOR)	0	6	3
8	Fatima-Ezzahra Aboufaras (MAR)	3	1	3
1	Nafia Kuş (TUR)	4	2	3
16	Fernanda Aguirre (CHI)	4	0	0

Quarter-finals
4	Althéa Laurin (FRA)	8	8
5	Lorena Brandl (GER)	3	3
9	Rama Abu Al-Rub (JOR)	7	0	0
1	Nafia Kuş (TUR)	3	1	0

Semi-finals
4	Althéa Laurin (FRA)	2	2
1	Nafia Kuş (TUR)	1	2

==== Pool B ====
Round of 16
15	Petra Štolbová (CZE)	4	2
2	Lee Da-bin (KOR)	4	3
7	Zhou Zeqi (CHN)	7	8
10	Marlene Jahl (AUT)	0	3
11	Astan Bathily (CIV)	0	7	0
6	Svetlana Osipova (UZB)	4	2	0
3	Rebecca McGowan (GBR)	13	13
14	Venice Traill (FIJ)	0	0

Quarter-finals
2	Lee Da-bin (KOR)	4	3	7
7	Zhou Zeqi (CHN)	2	8	6
6	Svetlana Osipova (UZB)	14	14
3	Rebecca McGowan (GBR)	6	2

Semi-finals
2	Lee Da-bin (KOR)	3	5
6	Svetlana Osipova (UZB)	3	9
