= 2025 World Taekwondo Championships – Women's middleweight =

Taekwondo competitions

Women's middleweight at the 2025 World Championships
- Venue: Taihu International Expo Center
- Dates: 26 October 2025
- Competitors: 38 from 37 nations

Medalists
gold medal	Sarah Chaâri	Belgium
silver medal	Kimi Laurène Ossin	Ivory Coast
bronze medal	Zhou Zeqi	China
bronze medal	Sude Yaren Uzunçavdar	Turkey

The women's middleweight competition at the 2025 World Taekwondo Championships was held on 26 October 2025 in Wuxi, China. Middleweights were limited to a maximum of 73 kilograms in body mass.

== Results ==
Legend

- P — Won by punitive declaration

=== Finals ===
Semifinals			Final
Sarah Chaâri (BEL)	0	7
Zhou Zeqi (CHN)	0	6	Sarah Chaâri (BEL)	3	8	5
Kimi Laurène Ossin (CIV)	4	4	Kimi Laurène Ossin (CIV)	2	12	3
Sude Yaren Uzunçavdar (TUR)	0	4

=== Top half ===
==== Section 1 ====
Round of 64
Deng Yu-zhen (TPE)	7	3	2
Malak El-Hosseiny (EGY)	8	3	4

Round of 32
Sarah Chaâri (BEL)	2	8
Malak El-Hosseiny (EGY)	0	0
Julia Nowak (POL)	11	4
Bintou Diakité (MLI)	4	3
Anastasiia Kosmycheva (AIN)	9	3
Eirini Ntova (GRE)	4	0
Victoria Heredia (MEX)	2	0
Althéa Laurin (FRA)	3	3

Round of 16
Sarah Chaâri (BEL)	5	5
Julia Nowak (POL)	2	3
Anastasiia Kosmycheva (AIN)	1	3
Althéa Laurin (FRA)	2	6

Quarterfinals
Sarah Chaâri (BEL)	4	8	6
Althéa Laurin (FRA)	3	9	3

==== Section 2 ====
Round of 64
Fatima Salifou (NIG)	0	8
Trần Nguyễn Ánh Ngân (VIE)	8	8
Arlettys Acosta (CUB)	13	13
Mayling Wemama (NCD)	0	1

Round of 32
Belén Morán (ESP)	8	8
Trần Nguyễn Ánh Ngân (VIE)	1	3
Dunya Saber (KSA)	9	5	2
Ruby Mackay (GBR)	1	6	4
Melika Mirhosseini (IRI)	3	4
Thaisa de Souza (BRA)	2	3
Arlettys Acosta (CUB)	0	6	0
Zhou Zeqi (CHN)	0	1	0

Round of 16
Belén Morán (ESP)	2	7
Ruby Mackay (GBR)	2	6
Melika Mirhosseini (IRI)	1	5
Zhou Zeqi (CHN)	5	11

Quarterfinals
Belén Morán (ESP)	6	1	2
Zhou Zeqi (CHN)	5	9	4

=== Bottom half ===
==== Section 3 ====
Round of 64
Madelyn Rodríguez (DOM)	7	3
Kylie Lewis (USA)	0	0
Doris Pole (CRO)	4	6	6
Dayana Folleco (ECU)	0	7	2

Round of 32
Nadica Božanić (SRB)	2	7	0
Madelyn Rodríguez (DOM)	1	5^{P}	0
Nika Rudolf (SLO)	3	6	2
Nazym Makhmutova (KAZ)	7	5	5
Yoon Do-hee (KOR)	5	11
Jasmin Andersen (DEN)	1	0
Doris Pole (CRO)	3	4
Kimi Laurène Ossin (CIV)	4	4

Round of 16
Nadica Božanić (SRB)	0	5
Nazym Makhmutova (KAZ)	0	0
Yoon Do-hee (KOR)	4	4	0
Kimi Laurène Ossin (CIV)	5	3	12

Quarterfinals
Nadica Božanić (SRB)	0	10	5
Kimi Laurène Ossin (CIV)	9	0	12^{P}

==== Section 4 ====
Round of 64
Aisha Chahal (AUS)	7	6
Pauline Lolohea (TGA)	6	3

Round of 32
Ava Lee (HAI)	5	7
Etisha Das (IND)	1	4
Renata Podolian (UKR)	0	3
Rama Abu Al-Rub (JOR)	9	9
Iveta Jiránková (CZE)	0	1
Crystal Weekes (PUR)	2	4
Aisha Chahal (AUS)	1	0
Sude Yaren Uzunçavdar (TUR)	8	0

Round of 16
Ava Lee (HAI)	4	2	8
Rama Abu Al-Rub (JOR)	3	5	1
Crystal Weekes (PUR)	5	0	0
Sude Yaren Uzunçavdar (TUR)	2	7	0

Quarterfinals
Ava Lee (HAI)	5	0	2
Sude Yaren Uzunçavdar (TUR)	5	7	4
