= Lorena Brandl =

German taekwondo practitioner

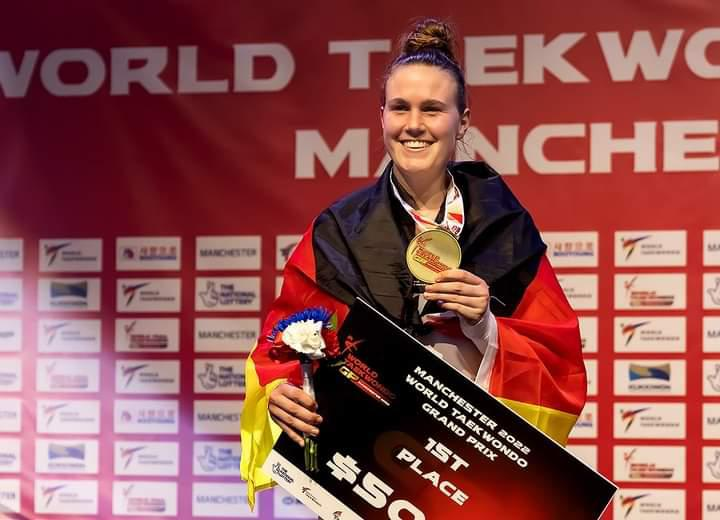

Personal information
- Nationality: German
- Born: 15 May 1997 (age 29) Pförring
- Height: 1.86 m (6 ft 1 in)

Sport
- Country: Germany
- Sport: Taekwondo
- Events: +67 kg, +73 kg
- Club: Tiger and Dragon Altmannstein/Mindelstetten
- Team: GER
- Turned pro: 2016
- Coached by: Bernhard Bruckbauer

Achievements and titles
- World finals: 3rd place, bronze medalist(s)
- Regional finals: 1st place, gold medalist(s)
- Highest world ranking: 5 (2024)
Medal record
Women's taekwondo
Representing Germany
World Championships
| Bronze medal – third place | 2021 Riyadh | +73 kg |
| Bronze medal – third place | 2022 Guadalajara | +73 kg |
Women's World Championships
| Bronze medal – third place | 2026 Taiyuan | +73 kg |
European Championships
| Gold medal – first place | 2024 Belgrade | +73 kg |
| Gold medal – first place | 2026 Munich | +73 kg |
| Silver medal – second place | 2019 Bari | +67 kg |
Grand Prix
| Gold medal – first place | 2022 Manchester | +67 kg |
| Bronze medal – third place | 2023 Taiyuan | +67 kg |
WT President's Cup
| Gold medal – first place | 2026 Nuremberg | +73 kg |
World Military Championships
| Gold medal – first place | 2025 Warendorf | +73 kg |
European Under 21 Championships
| Gold medal – first place | 2015 Bucharest | +73 kg |
| Bronze medal – third place | 2017 Sofia | +73 kg |
- Updated on 28 August 2026

Lorena Brandl (born 15 May 1997) is a German taekwondo athlete. She is the 2024 and 2026 European Champion in the women's +73 kg weight category.

== Career ==
=== Junior ===
Brandl started practising the Korean martial arts taekwondo in 2007 and participated in her first international competition in 2013. She competed for the German national team for the first time in 2014, the same year she took part in her first European Championships (U21). In 2015, she finished first at the U21 European Championships in Bucharest, and she won a bronze medal at the 2017 U21 European Championships in Sofia.

=== Senior ===
Brandl competed in the World Championships in 2015 in Chelyabinsk, 2017 in Muju and 2019 in Manchester in the +73 kg weight category, where she remained without a medal each time. In 2016, she participated in the European Championships in Montreaux, 2018 in Kazan, 2021 in Sofia and 2022 in Manchester. In 2019, she was runner-up in the +67 kg weight class at the Extra European Championships in Bari. In 2021, she was a participant in the qualifying tournament for the Tokyo Olympics, where she finished third in the +67 kg weight class, but did not qualify to compete in the Olympic Games. At the 2021 Women's World Championships, Brandl won a bronze medal.

Brandl won the gold medal in the +67 kg class at the 2022 Grand Prix in Manchester. She also won a bronze at the 2023 Grand Prix in Taiyuan. In 2022, she participated in the World Championships in Guadalajara and won a bronze medal in the +73 kg weight class.

Brandl competed at the 2023 World Championships in Baku, where she lost in the +73 kg weight class in the opening fight (round of 32) to Nika Klepac of Croatia. In January 2024, due to her being in 8th place in the Olympic rankings, she qualified a quota place in the +67 kg weight class at the 2024 Olympic Games for Germany.

At the 2024 European Championships in Belgrade, Brandl became European Champion after beating Nafia Kuş from Turkey in the finale. On 14 May, the German Olympic Sports Confederation nominated Brandl to participate in the Summer Olympic Games in August 2024. In August, she represented Germany at the 2024 Summer Olympics, where she competed in the +67 kg event and defeated Arlettys Acosta in the round of 16. Brandl lost to Althéa Laurin in the quarter finals, but since Laurin later advanced to the final, Brandl competed in the repechage match. Here, she won against Munira Abdusalomova from Tajikistan and therefore qualified to the bronze medal contest, where she fought against Lee Da-bin. In the bronze medal match, Brandl lost to Lee and hence took fifth place.

In 2025, Brandl became military world champion in the heavy weight kg class in Warendorf. She became a two-time European champion in 2026 in Munich after beating Lauren Williams in the finale.

== Personal life ==
Brandl completed an apprenticeship as a warehouse logistics specialist. Afterwards, she joined the Bundeswehr's sports support group (German: Sportfördergruppe der Bundeswehr) in 2016 and has been a Soldier-Athlete (German: Sportsoldat) ever since.
