= Gao Pan =

Chinese taekwondo practitioner

Personal information
- Born: 22 May 1995 (age 31)

Sport
- Country: China
- Sport: Taekwondo
Medal record
Women's taekwondo
Representing China
Asian Taekwondo Championships
Gold medal – first place	2018 Ho Chi Minh City	+73 kg
Asian Indoor and Martial Arts Games
Gold medal – first place	2017 Ashgabat	67 kg
Asian Games
Bronze medal – third place	2018 Jakarta	+67 kg

Gao Pan (born 22 May 1995) is a Chinese taekwondo practitioner. She is a gold medalist at the Asian Indoor and Martial Arts Games and Asian Taekwondo Championships and a bronze medalist at the Asian Games.

In 2017, Gao competed in the women's middleweight event at the 2017 World Taekwondo Championships held in Muju, South Korea without winning a medal. She won her first match against Kirstie Alora of the Philippines and she was eliminated from the competition in her next match, against Petra Matijašević. A few months later, she won the gold medal in the women's −67 kg event at the 2017 Asian Indoor and Martial Arts Games held in Ashgabat, Turkmenistan.

In 2018, Gao won one of the bronze medals in the women's +67 kg event at the 2018 Asian Games held in Jakarta, Indonesia. In the semi-finals, she was eliminated by the eventual gold medalist Lee Da-bin of South Korea.
