= Marlene Jahl =

Austrian taekwondo practitioner

Personal information
- Born: 7 May 1995 (age 31) Linz, Austria

Sport
- Country: Austria
- Sport: Taekwondo
- Weight class: +67 kg, +73 kg
Medal record
Women's taekwondo
Representing Austria
World Championships
Bronze medal – third place	2022 Guadalajara	+73 kg
European Championships
Bronze medal – third place	2021 Sofia	+73 kg

Marlene Jahl (born 7 April 1995) is an Austrian taekwondo practitioner. She won one of the bronze medals in the women's heavyweight event at the 2022 World Taekwondo Championships held in Guadalajara, Mexico. She also won one of the bronze medals in her event at the 2021 European Taekwondo Championships held in Sofia, Bulgaria.

Jahl competed in the women's heavyweight event at the 2023 World Taekwondo Championships held in Baku, Azerbaijan. She also competed for Austria at the 2023 European Games in the women's +73 kg event.

She represented Austria at the 2024 Summer Olympics in the women's +67 kg event.
