= Marie-Paule Blé =

French taekwondo practitioner

Personal information
- Nationality: French
- Born: 6 July 1998 (age 27)

Sport
- Sport: Taekwondo
Medal record
Representing France
Women's taekwondo
World Championships
Bronze medal – third place	2019 Manchester	Middleweight
European Championships
Bronze medal – third place	2022 Manchester	73 kg

Marie-Paule Blé (born 6 July 1998) is a French taekwondo practitioner.

She won a bronze medal in middleweight at the 2019 World Taekwondo Championships, after being defeated by Lee Da-bin in the semifinal.

She also won one of the bronze medals in her event at the 2022 European Taekwondo Championships held in Manchester, United Kingdom.
