= Taekwondo at the 2023 European Games – Women's +73 kg =

Taekwondo competition

Women's +73 kg at the 2023 European Games
- Venue: Krynica-Zdrój Arena
- Date: 26 June
- Competitors: 14 from 14 nations

Medalists
gold medal	Nafia Kuş	Turkey
silver medal	Aleksandra Kowalczuk	Poland
bronze medal	Solène Avoulète	France
bronze medal	Kalina Boyadzhieva	Bulgaria

The women's +73 kg competition in taekwondo at the 2023 European Games took place on 26 June at the Krynica-Zdrój Arena.

== Schedule ==
All times are Central European Summer Time (UTC+2).

Date	Time	Event
Monday, 26 June 2023	09:24	Round of 16
Monday, 26 June 2023	14:00	Quarterfinals
Monday, 26 June 2023	15:36	Semifinals
Monday, 26 June 2023	16:24	Repechage
Monday, 26 June 2023	19:00	Bronze medal bouts
Monday, 26 June 2023	20:24	Final

== Results ==
Round of 16
Nika Petanjek (CRO)	0	5
Tania Castiñeira (ESP)	1	6
Marlene Jahl (AUT)	12	13
Sofia Antoniou (CYP)	4	0
Renata Podolian (UKR)	6	2
Aleksandra Kowalczuk (POL)	6	16
Nafia Kuş (TUR)	3	9
Orsolya Padla (HUN)	0	0
Kalina Boyadzhieva (BUL)	5	11
Dana Azran (ISR)	2	7
Solène Avoulète (FRA)	12	13
Agoritsa Artemia Kitsiou (GRE)	0	1

Quarterfinals
Bianca Cook (GBR)	7	3
Tania Castiñeira (ESP)	0	0
Marlene Jahl (AUT)	3	1
Aleksandra Kowalczuk (POL)	6	1
Nafia Kuş (TUR)	0	12
Kalina Boyadzhieva (BUL)	0	4
Solène Avoulète (FRA)	4	4
Lorena Brandl (GER)	3	4

Semifinals
Bianca Cook (GBR)	8	5	0
Aleksandra Kowalczuk (POL)	4	6	0
Nafia Kuş (TUR)	4	1
Solène Avoulète (FRA)	3	0

Final
Aleksandra Kowalczuk (POL)	0	2
Nafia Kuş (TUR)	0	4

=== Repechage ===
Repechage			Bronze medal bout
			Solène Avoulète (FRA)	1	10	12
Marlene Jahl (AUT)	15	15	Marlene Jahl (AUT)	2	2	6
Renata Podolian (UKR)	2	1
Orsolya Padla (HUN)	0	3
Kalina Boyadzhieva (BUL)	1	10	Kalina Boyadzhieva (BUL)	5	12
			Bianca Cook (GBR)	2	7
