= Taekwondo at the 2023 Pan American Games – Women's +67 kg =

Women's +67 kg at the 2023 Pan American Games
- Venue: Contact Sports Center
- Start date: October 23, 2023
- End date: October 23, 2023
- Competitors: 11 from 11 nations

Medalists
Gold medal	Madelynn Gorman-Shore	United States
Silver medal	Gloria Mosquera	Colombia
Bronze medal	Aliyah Shipman	Haiti
Bronze medal	Victoria Heredia	Mexico

The women's +67 kg competition of the taekwondo events at the 2023 Pan American Games in Santiago, Chile, was held on October 23 at the Contact Sports Center.

== Qualification ==
The host nation, Chile, qualified automatically and the quotas spots were awarded at the qualification tournament held in Rio de Janeiro in March 2023. The final quota spots were awarded as wildcards (if applicable).

== Results ==
=== Bracket ===
Round of 16
Dayana Folleco Mina (ECU)	2
Carolina Del Valle (VEN)	0
Victoria Belen Rivas (ARG)	0
Victoria Heredia (MEX)	2
Aliyah Shipman (HAI)	2
Frislaidis Martínez (CUB)	0

Quarterfinals
Madelynn Gorman-Shore (USA)	2
Dayana Folleco Mina (ECU)	0
Katherine Rodríguez (DOM)	0
Crystal Weekes (PUR)	2
Gloria Mosquera (COL)	2
Victoria Heredia (MEX)	0
Aliyah Shipman (HAI)	2
Gabriele Siqueira (BRA)	0

Semifinals
Madelynn Gorman-Shore (USA)	2
Crystal Weekes (PUR)	0
Aliyah Shipman (HAI)	0
Gloria Mosquera (COL)	2

Gold medal match
Madelynn Gorman-Shore (USA)	2
Gloria Mosquera (COL)	1

=== Repechage ===
Bronze medal match
Aliyah Shipman (HAI)	2
Dayana Folleco Mina (ECU)	1

Bronze medal match
Crystal Weekes (PUR)	1
Victoria Heredia (MEX)	2
