= Zhou Zeqi =

Zhou Zeqi may refer to:

- Zhou Zeqi (badminton)
- Zhou Zeqi (taekwondo)
