= Taekwondo at the 2019 Pan American Games – Women's +67 kg =

Taekwondo – Women's +67 kg at the 2019 Pan American Games
- Venue: Polideportivo Callao
- Dates: July 29
- Competitors: 13 from 13 nations

Medalists
Gold medal	Briseida Acosta; Mexico
Silver medal	Gloria Mosquera; Colombia
Bronze medal	Madelynn Gorman-Shore; United States
Bronze medal	Raiany Fidelis; Brazil

The women's +67 kg competition of the taekwondo events at the 2019 Pan American Games took place on July 29 at the Polideportivo Callao.

== Results ==
=== Main bracket ===
The final results were:

Preliminary round
Carolina Fernandez (VEN)	1
Keyla Ávila (HON)	0
Crystal Weekes (PUR)	2
Yamitsi Carbonell (CUB)	12
Rachel Cuma (CAN)	14
Camila Orihuella (PER)	3
Aniya Louissaint (HAI)	3
Raiany Fidelis (BRA)	18
Gloria Mosquera (COL)	22
Megan Lawrence (TRI)	1

Quarterfinals
Briseida Acosta (MEX)	7
Carolina Fernandez (VEN)	3
Yamitsi Carbonell (CUB)	20
Rachel Cuma (CAN)	9
Katherine Rodríguez (DOM)
Raiany Fidelis (BRA)	RSC
Gloria Mosquera (COL)	16
Madelynn Gorman-Shore (USA)	5

Semifinals
Briseida Acosta (MEX)	11
Yamitsi Carbonell (CUB)	8
Raiany Fidelis (BRA)	10
Gloria Mosquera (COL)	23

Gold medal match
Briseida Acosta (MEX)	10
Gloria Mosquera (COL)	5

=== Repechage ===
Semifinal			Bronze medal match
			1	Yamitsi Carbonell (CUB)	5
2	Madelynn Gorman-Shore (USA)	15		Madelynn Gorman-Shore (USA)	8
3	Megan Lawrence (TRI)	6

Bronze medal match
Carolina Fernandez (VEN)	0
Raiany Fidelis (BRA)	7
