= Nadica Božanić =

Serbian taekwondo practitioner (born 2001)

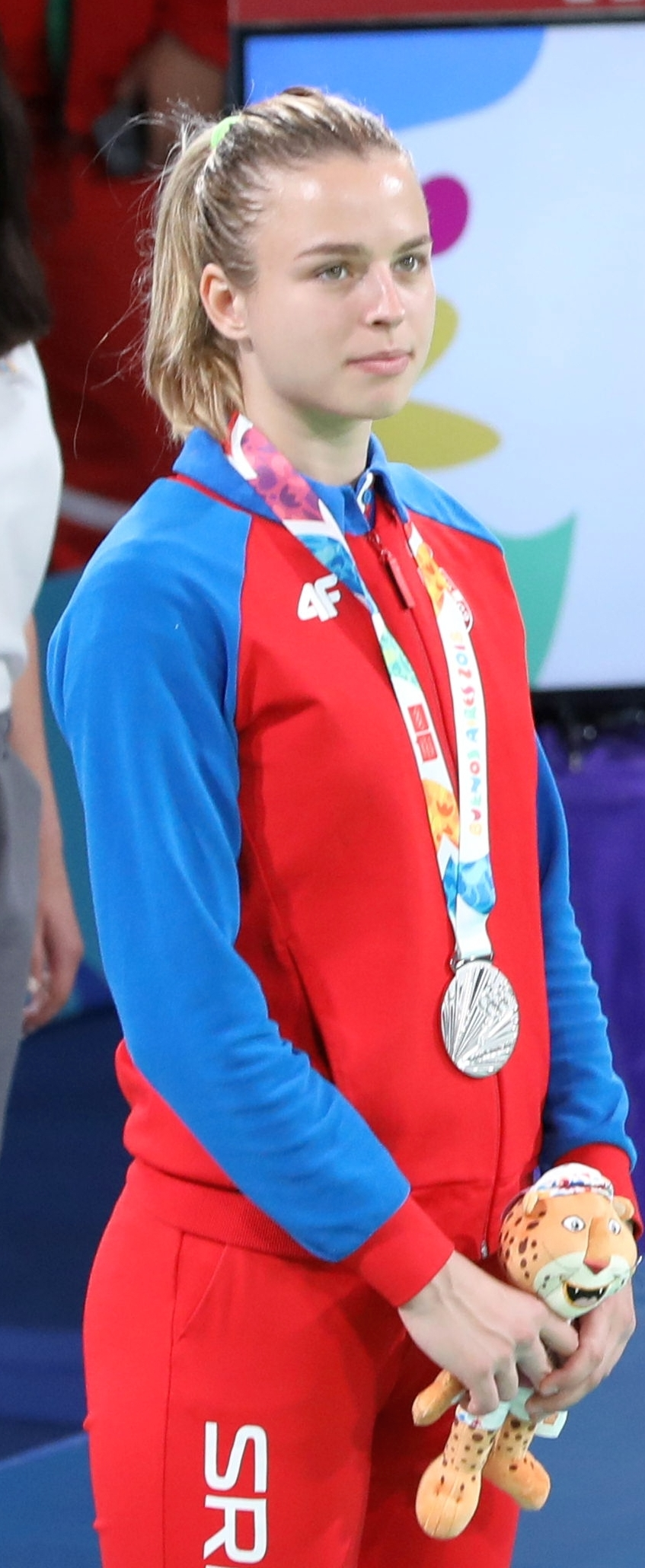
- Božanić in 2018

Personal information
- Born: 13 March 2001 (age 25)

Sport
- Country: Serbia
- Sport: Taekwondo
- Weight class: 73 kg
Medal record
Women's taekwondo
Representing Serbia
World Championships
Gold medal – first place	2022 Guadalajara	73 kg
European Games
Silver medal – second place	2023 Kraków-Małopolska	73 kg
Summer Youth Olympics
Silver medal – second place	2018 Buenos Aires	63 kg

Nadica Božanić (Serbian Cyrillic: Надица Божанић; born 13 March 2001) is a Serbian taekwondo practitioner. She is a world champion in taekwondo, having won gold in the 2022 World Taekwondo Championships in the middleweight category.

== Career ==
Božanić won the silver medal in the girls' 63 kg event at the 2018 Summer Youth Olympics held in Buenos Aires, Argentina, losing the final against Yalda Valinejad of Iran. It was her nation's fourth medal at the competition. She won the Young Athlete of the Year award from the Olympic Committee of Serbia in December 2018. She took part in the February 2019 President's Cup tournament in Antalya, Turkey, but lost in the quarter-finals of the 63 kg category.

Božanić represented Serbia at the 2022 Mediterranean Games held in Oran, Algeria. She competed in the women's +67 kg event where she was eliminated in her second match. Božanić won the gold medal in the women's middleweight event at the 2022 World Taekwondo Championships held in Guadalajara, Mexico.

Božanić opened the 2023 season with the President's Cup competition in Istanbul in February. She won bronze in the 73 kg category. In April 2023, she took gold at the Austrian Open event in the same category, defeating Sude Yaren Uzunçavdar of Turkey in the final. In May 2023, Božanić competed in the women's middleweight event at the World Taekwondo Championships held in Baku, Azerbaijan. She was eliminated in the round of 16 by eventual bronze medalist Matea Jelić of Croatia. A month later, she won the silver medal in the women's 73 kg event at the 2023 European Games held in the Polish city of Krakow, after losing in the final to Uzunçavdar.
