= 2024 European Taekwondo Championships – Women's 73 kg =

Women's 73 kg at the 2024 European Taekwondo Championships
- Venue: Belgrade Fair – Hall 1
- Location: Belgrade, Serbia
- Dates: 9 May
- Competitors: 15 from 15 nations

Medalists
| gold medal | Althéa Laurin | France |
| silver medal | Sude Yaren Uzunçavdar | Turkey |
| bronze medal | Matea Jelić | Croatia |
| bronze medal | Yanna Schneider | Germany |

The women's 73 kg competition at the 2024 European Taekwondo Championships was held on 9 May 2024.

== Results ==
Round of 16
Rebeka Füredi (HUN) | 1
Lauren Williams (GBR) | 2
Matea Jelić (CRO) | 2
Sara Pidro (BIH) | 0
Renata Podolian (UKR) | 0
Iva Petrović (SRB) | 2
Yanna Schneider (GER) | 2
Julia Nowak (POL) | 1
Anastasia Delidimitri (GRE) | 0
Polina Khan (AIN) | 2
Belén Morán (ESP) | 1
Iveta Jiránková (CZE) | 2
Joana Cardoso (POR) | 0
Sude Yaren Uzunçavdar (TUR) | 2

Quarterfinals
Althéa Laurin (FRA) | 2
Lauren Williams (GBR) | 0
Matea Jelić (CRO) | 2
Iva Petrović (SRB) | 1
Yanna Schneider (GER) | 2
Polina Khan (AIN) | 0
Iveta Jiránková (CZE) | 1
Sude Yaren Uzunçavdar (TUR) | 2

Semifinals
Althéa Laurin (FRA) | 2
Matea Jelić (CRO) | 0
Yanna Schneider (GER) | 0
Sude Yaren Uzunçavdar (TUR) | 2

Final
Althéa Laurin (FRA) | 2
Sude Yaren Uzunçavdar (TUR) | 1
