= Gloria Mosquera =

Colombian taekwondo practitioner

Personal information
- Full name: Gloria Camila Mosquera Riascos
- Born: 6 September 1995 (age 31)

Sport
- Country: Colombia
- Sport: Taekwondo
- Weight class: +67 kg; +73 kg
Medal record
Representing Colombia
Women's taekwondo
| Event | 1st | 2nd | 3rd |
|---|---|---|---|
| Pan American Games | 0 | 2 | 0 |
| Pan American Championships | 3 | 0 | 1 |
| CAC Games | 2 | 0 | 1 |
| South American Games | 3 | 0 | 0 |
| Bolivarian Games | 2 | 0 | 0 |
| Total | 10 | 2 | 2 |
Pan American Games
| Silver medal – second place | 2019 Lima | +67 kg |
| Silver medal – second place | 2023 Santiago | +67 kg |
Pan American Championships
| Gold medal – first place | 2022 Punta Cana | +73 kg |
| Gold medal – first place | 2024 Rio de Janeiro | +73 kg |
| Gold medal – first place | 2026 Rio de Janeiro | +73 kg |
| Bronze medal – third place | 2021 Cancún | +73 kg |
Central American and Caribbean Games
| Gold medal – first place | 2023 San Salvador | +67 kg |
| Gold medal – first place | 2026 Santo Domingo | +73 kg |
| Bronze medal – third place | 2018 Barranquilla | +73 kg |
South American Games
| Gold medal – first place | 2018 Cochabamba | +67 kg |
| Gold medal – first place | 2022 Asunción | +67 kg |
| Gold medal – first place | 2026 Santa Fe | +67 kg |
Bolivarian Games
| Gold medal – first place | 2017 Santa Marta | +73 kg |
| Gold medal – first place | 2022 Valledupar | +67 kg |

Gloria Camila Mosquera Riascos is a Colombian taekwondo practitioner. She won the gold medal in the women's +67 kg event at the 2022 South American Games in Asunción, Paraguay and the 2022 Bolivarian Games in Valledupar, Colombia. She also won the gold medal in her event at the 2022 Pan American Taekwondo Championships held in Punta Cara, Dominican Republic.

In 2019, Mosquera competed in the women's heavyweight event at the World Taekwondo Championships held in Manchester, United Kingdom. She won the silver medal in the women's +67 kg event at the Pan American Games held in Lima, Peru.

Mosquera competed in the women's heavyweight event at the 2022 World Taekwondo Championships held in Guadalajara, Mexico. She also competed in the women's heavyweight event at the 2023 World Taekwondo Championships held in Baku, Azerbaijan.

== Achievements ==
| Year | Tournament | Location | Result | Event |
Representing Colombia
| 2017 | Bolivarian Games | Santa Marta, Colombia | 1st | +73 kg |
| 2018 | South American Games | Cochabamba, Bolivia | 1st | +67 kg |
| 2018 | Central American and Caribbean Games | Barranquilla, Colombia | 3rd | +73 kg |
| 2019 | Pan American Games | Lima, Peru | 2nd | +67 kg |
| 2021 | Pan American Championships | Cancún, Mexico | 3rd | +73 kg |
| 2022 | Pan American Championships | Punta Cana, Dominican Republic | 1st | +73 kg |
| 2022 | Bolivarian Games | Valledupar, Colombia | 1st | +67 kg |
| 2022 | South American Games | Asunción, Paraguay | 1st | +67 kg |
| 2023 | Central American and Caribbean Games | San Salvador, El Salvador | 1st | +67 kg |
| 2023 | Pan American Games | Santiago, Chile | 2nd | +67 kg |
| 2024 | Pan American Championships | Rio de Janeiro, Brazil | 1st | +73 kg |
| 2026 | Pan American Championships | Rio de Janeiro, Brazil | 1st | +73 kg |
| 2026 | Central American and Caribbean Games | Santo Domingo, Dominican Republic | 1st | +73 kg |
| 2026 | South American Games | Rosario, Argentina | 1st | +67 kg |
