= Taekwondo at the 2022 Asian Games – Mixed team =

Taekwondo competition

Mixed team at the 2022 Asian Games
- Venue: Lin'an Sports and Culture Centre
- Date: 25 September 2023
- Competitors: 28 from 7 nations

Medalists
| gold medal | China; Cui Yang, Song Zhaoxiang, Song Jie, Zhou Zeqi |
| silver medal | South Korea; Park Woo-hyeok, Seo Geon-woo, Kim Jan-di, Lee Da-bin |
| bronze medal | Vietnam; Lý Hồng Phúc, Phạm Minh Bảo Kha, Bạc Thị Khiêm, Phạm Ngọc Châm |
| bronze medal | Uzbekistan; Jasurbek Jaysunov, Shukhrat Salaev, Svetlana Osipova, Ozoda Sobirjonova |

The mixed team kyorugi event at the 2022 Asian Games took place on 25 September 2023 at Lin'an Sports and Culture Centre, Hangzhou, China.

== Schedule ==
All times are China Standard Time (UTC+08:00)

| Date | Time | Event |
|---|---|---|
| Monday, 25 September 2023 | 14:00 | Quarterfinals |
| Monday, 25 September 2023 | 14:00 | Semifinals |
| Monday, 25 September 2023 | 14:00 | Gold medal contest |

== Squads ==
| China | Chinese Taipei | Hong Kong | Philippines |
|---|---|---|---|
| Cui Yang; Song Zhaoxiang; Song Jie; Zhou Zeqi | Chiu Yi-jui; Lee Meng-en; Lin Wei-chun; Lo Chia-ling | Chiok Chun Yin; Lo Wai Fung; Lam Siu Wai; Law Sin Yi | Arven Alcantara; Dave Cea; Jessica Canabal; Laila Delo |
| South Korea | Uzbekistan | Vietnam | |
| Park Woo-hyeok; Seo Geon-woo; Kim Jan-di; Lee Da-bin | Jasurbek Jaysunov; Shukhrat Salaev; Svetlana Osipova; Ozoda Sobirjonova | Lý Hồng Phúc; Phạm Minh Bảo Kha; Bạc Thị Khiêm; Phạm Ngọc Châm | |

== Results ==
| Quarterfinals | | Semifinals | | Gold medal contest |
| | | China | 88 |
| Philippines | 26 | Vietnam | 18 |
| Vietnam | 35 | | | China | 84 |
| Chinese Taipei | 43 | | | South Korea | 77 |
| South Korea | 93 | South Korea | 48 |
| Hong Kong | 4 | Uzbekistan | 47 |
| Uzbekistan | 101 |
