= Svetlana Saidova =

Uzbekistani taekwondo practitioner

Svetlana Osipova
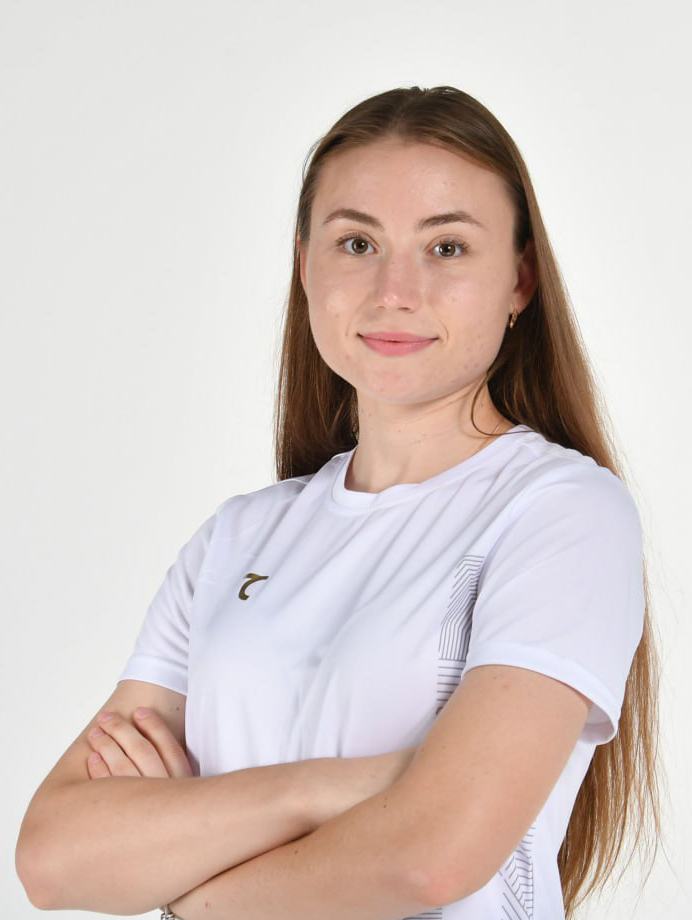

Personal information
- Born: Svetlana Valerevna Osipova; 3 May 2000 (age 26) Tashkent, Uzbekistan
- Height: 182 cm (6 ft 0 in)

Sport
- Country: Uzbekistan
- Sport: Taekwondo
- Weight class: +73
- Coached by: Pavel Khan
Medal record
Women's taekwondo
Representing Uzbekistan
Olympic Games
Silver medal – second place	2024 Paris	+67 kg
World Championships
Gold medal – first place	2022 Guadalajara	+73 kg
Silver medal – second place	2023 Baku	+73 kg
Silver medal – second place	2025 Wuxi	+73 kg
Asian Championships
Gold medal – first place	2026 Ulaanbaatar	+73 kg
Bronze medal – third place	2024 Da Nang	+73 kg
Asian Games
Bronze medal – third place	2018 Jakarta	+67 kg
Bronze medal – third place	2022 Hangzhou	+67 kg
Bronze medal – third place	2022 Hangzhou	Mixed team
Islamic Solidarity Games
Gold medal – first place	2021 Konya	+73 kg
Silver medal – second place	2025 Riyadh	+70 kg
Military World Games
Gold medal – first place	2019 Wuhan	+73 kg
World University Games
Bronze medal – third place	2021 Chengdu	73 kg
Asian Indoor and Martial Arts Games
Silver medal – second place	2017 Ashgabat	73 kg

Svetlana Valerevna Osipova (Uzbek: [svetˈlɑnɑ oˈsipovɑ], Russian: [svʲɪtˈlanə ɐˈsʲipəvə]; born 3 May 2000) is an Uzbek taekwondo athlete and a member of the Uzbekistan national team. In 2017, she won a silver medal at the Asian Indoor and Martial Arts Games. In 2018 and 2023, she earned bronze medals at the Summer Asian Games. In 2019, she secured a gold medal at the World Military Games. In 2022, she won a gold medal at the World Taekwondo Championship, and in 2023, she claimed a silver medal.

== Career ==
In 2017, she took part in the Asian Indoor and Martial Arts Games, which were held in Ashgabat, Turkmenistan. She won a silver medal in the weight category up to 73 kg, losing in the final to a South Korean athlete named Myeong Mina.

In 2018, Svetlana Osipova won a bronze medal at the "French Open" international tournament, losing in the semi-finals to the French athlete Solène Avoulette. In the same year, she secured a bronze medal in the weight category over 67 kg at the 2018 Asian Games, which took place in Jakarta, Indonesia, losing to a South Korean athlete named Kim Bich-Na.

In 2019, she won a gold medal at the World Military Games in the weight category over 78 kg, which were held in Wuhan, China.

In 2021, at the Taekwondo License Tournament for Asian continent athletes held in Amman, Jordan, she earned a spot to compete in the 2020 Summer Olympics.

At the 2020 Summer Olympics in Tokyo, Japan, she competed in the weight category over 67 kg. In the round of 16, she faced a taekwondo athlete from Kazakhstan, Zhansel Deniz, and lost with a score of 9:10, she finished in 11th place.

In 2022 Osipova won the gold medal in the women's +73 kg event at the 2022 World Taekwondo Championships held at the Centro Acuático CODE Metropolitano, in Guadalajara, Mexico.

In 2023, at the World Taekwondo Championship held in Baku, in the category over 73 kg, Svetlana won a silver medal. In the final match, she was defeated by a Turkish athlete named Nafia Kuş. In the same year, at the Summer Asian Games in Hangzhou, China, in taekwondo competitions in the weight category over 67 kg, she earned a bronze medal.

== Achievements ==
Year	Event	Location	Place
2017	Asian Indoor and Martial Arts Games	Ashgabat, Turkmenistan	2nd
2018	Asian Games	Jakarta, Indonesia	3rd
2019	Military World Games	Wuhan, China	1st
2022	Islamic Solidarity Games	Konya, Turkey	1st
2022	World Championships	Guadalajara, Mexico	1st
2023	World Championships	Baku, Azerbaijan	2nd
2023	Asian Games	Hangzhou, China	3rd
2024	Asian Championships	Da Nang, Vietnam	3rd
2024	Summer Olympics	Paris, France	2nd
