= Kimi Laurène Ossin =

Ivorian taekwondo practitioner (born 2008)

Personal information
- Nationality: Ivorian
- Born: 17 April 2008 (age 18)

Sport
- Sport: Taekwondo
- Weight class: 73 kg
Medal record
Women's taekwondo
Representing Ivory Coast
World Championships
Silver medal – second place	2025 Wuxi	73 kg
World Junior Championships
Bronze medal – third place	2024 Chuncheon	68 kg

Kimi Laurène Ossin (born 17 April 2008) is an Ivorian taekwondo practitioner. She won a silver medal at the 2025 World Taekwondo Championships.

== Career ==
Ossin competed at the 2024 World Taekwondo Junior Championships and won a bronze medal in the 68 kg category. In April 2025, she competed at the 6th World Taekwondo President's Cup Africa tournament, and won a gold medal in the junior 73 kg category. In August 2025, she was awarded the best athlete at the 2025 National Award of Excellence by National Lottery of Côte d'Ivoire (LONACI). In October 2025, she made her World Taekwondo Championships debut at the 2025 World Taekwondo Championships and won a silver medal in the 73 kg category, losing to Sarah Chaâri in the finals.
