= Taekwondo at the 2022 Mediterranean Games – Women's +67 kg =

Taekwondo competition

Taekwondo – Women's +67 kg at the 2022 Mediterranean Games
- Venue: Mohammed Ben Ahmed Convention Centre
- Date: 4 July
- Competitors: 9 from 9 nations

Medalists
gold medal	Nafia Kuş	Turkey
silver medal	Fatima-Ezzahra Aboufaras	Morocco
bronze medal	Nika Petanjek	Croatia
bronze medal	Althéa Laurin	France

The women's +67 kg competition in taekwondo at the 2022 Mediterranean Games was held on 4 July at the Mohammed ben Ahmed CCO in Oran.

== Results ==
Legend

- PTG — Won by Points Gap
- SUP — Won by superiority
- OT — Won on over time (Golden Point)
- DQ — Won by disqualification
- PUN — Won by punitive declaration
- WD — Won by withdrawal

Round of 16
Nadica Božanić (SRB)	10
Maisoun Tolba (EGY)	3

Quarterfinals
Althéa Laurin (FRA)	24
Nadica Božanić (SRB)	5
Fatima-Ezzahra Aboufaras (MAR)	23
Maristella Smiraglia (ITA)	13
Tania Castiñeira (ESP)	4
Nika Petanjek (CRO)	7
Assia Kadi (ALG)	0
Nafia Kuş (TUR)	20^{PTG}

Semifinals
Althéa Laurin (FRA)	6
Fatima-Ezzahra Aboufaras (MAR)	9
Nika Petanjek (CRO)	10
Nafia Kuş (TUR)	11^{SUP}

Final
Fatima-Ezzahra Aboufaras (MAR)	0
Nafia Kuş (TUR)	5
