= Taekwondo at the 2026 South American Games =

Taekwondo competitions at the 2026 South American Games

- Venue: Rural Nave
- Dates: September 23–25
- Competitors: 96 from 14 nations

Taekwondo competitions at the 2026 South American Games in Rosario, Santa Fe, and Rafaela, Argentina, were held between September 23 and 25 at Rural Nave, located within Parque de la Independencia in Rosario.

A total of 12 events was contested (five men, five women and two mixed).

== Medal summary ==
=== Medal table ===
* Host nation (Argentina)

Rank	Nation	Gold	Silver	Bronze	Total
1	Brazil	3	3	4	10
2	Colombia	3	2	3	8
3	Peru	3	0	0	3
4	Argentina*	1	4	5	10
5	Venezuela	1	0	4	5
6	Ecuador	1	0	2	3
7	Chile	0	2	2	4
8	Uruguay	0	1	0	1
9	Paraguay	0	0	2	2
10	Guyana	0	0	1	1
10	Panama	0	0	1	1
Totals (11 entries)		12	12	24	48

=== Medalists ===
==== Men ====
Event	Gold	Silver	Bronze
58 kg	Yohandri Granado; Venezuela	Ignacio Espínola Serial; Argentina	Agustín Ríos; Chile
58 kg	Yohandri Granado; Venezuela	Ignacio Espínola Serial; Argentina	Paulo Melo; Brazil
68 kg	José Acuña; Argentina	João Victor Diniz; Brazil	Jeshuath Pedraza; Venezuela
68 kg	José Acuña; Argentina	João Victor Diniz; Brazil	Ian Romero; Panama
80 kg	Henrique Marques; Brazil	Joaquín Churchill; Chile	Miguel Trejos; Colombia
80 kg	Henrique Marques; Brazil	Joaquín Churchill; Chile	Santino Policeli; Argentina
+80 kg	Maicol Solis; Colombia	Mateo di Leo Blas; Argentina	Luis Álvarez; Venezuela
+80 kg	Maicol Solis; Colombia	Mateo di Leo Blas; Argentina	Pedro Alves; Brazil
Individual poomsae	Rodrigo Subauste; Peru	Alex Silva; Brazil	Fernando Gilette; Argentina
Individual poomsae	Rodrigo Subauste; Peru	Alex Silva; Brazil	Fernando Salgado; Ecuador

==== Women ====
Event	Gold	Silver	Bronze
49 kg	Andrea Ramírez; Colombia	María Grippoli; Uruguay	Julia Nazário; Brazil
49 kg	Andrea Ramírez; Colombia	María Grippoli; Uruguay	Ceili Peterson; Guyana
57 kg	Maria Clara Pacheco; Brazil	María Julia Sepúlveda; Argentina	Alexmar Sulbaran; Venezuela
57 kg	Maria Clara Pacheco; Brazil	María Julia Sepúlveda; Argentina	Angelyn Saldaña; Colombia
67 kg	Milena Titoneli; Brazil	Claudia Gallardo; Chile	Brenda Ruíz Díaz; Argentina
67 kg	Milena Titoneli; Brazil	Claudia Gallardo; Chile	Mell Mina; Ecuador
+67 kg	Gloria Mosquera; Colombia	Mikaela Oliveira; Brazil	Victoria Belén Rivas; Argentina
+67 kg	Gloria Mosquera; Colombia	Mikaela Oliveira; Brazil	Fernanda Aguirre; Chile
Individual poomsae	Fabiana Varillas; Peru	Daniela Quirama; Colombia	Clara Ansedes; Argentina
Individual poomsae	Fabiana Varillas; Peru	Daniela Quirama; Colombia	Nicole Maciel; Brazil

==== Mixed ====
Event	Gold	Silver	Bronze
Poomsae pairs	Rodrigo Subauste; Fabiana Varillas; Peru	Fernando Gilette; Clara Ansedes; Argentina	Isaac Vélez; Dariana Suache; Colombia
Poomsae pairs	Rodrigo Subauste; Fabiana Varillas; Peru	Fernando Gilette; Clara Ansedes; Argentina	Jaesson Garay; Andrea Gómez; Paraguay
Poomsae freestyle teams	Katlen Jerves; Fernando Salgado; Lester Mota; Lissette Segura; Mario Troya; Ecuador	Daniela Quirama; Dariana Suache; Michael Mejía; Julian Ramírez; Isaac Vélez; Colombia	Nancy Haidar; Fernanda Melillo; Georfren Reyes; Bryan González; Aaron Bolívar; Venezuela
Poomsae freestyle teams	Katlen Jerves; Fernando Salgado; Lester Mota; Lissette Segura; Mario Troya; Ecuador	Daniela Quirama; Dariana Suache; Michael Mejía; Julian Ramírez; Isaac Vélez; Colombia	Jaesson Garay; Antonella Chamorro; Ruben Arce; Andrea Gómez; Taekyo Priore; Paraguay

== Participation ==
Fourteen nations participated in the taekwondo events of the 2026 South American Games.

- Argentina (10)
- Aruba (1)
- Bolivia (9)
- Brazil (10)
- Chile (5)
- Colombia (12)
- Ecuador (9)
- Guyana (1)
- Panama (4)
- Paraguay (7)
- Peru (8)
- Suriname (2)
- Uruguay (6)
- Venezuela (12)

== Results ==
=== Men's 58 kg ===
Quarterfinals
Paulo Melo (BRA)	2
Aharon Rivero (URU)	0
Alejandro Tordoya (BOL)	0
Ignacio Espinola (ARG)	2
Agustín Ríos (CHI)	2
Jesús Escurra (PAR)	0
Yohandri Granado (VEN)	2
Franco Moreno (PER)	0

Semifinals
Paulo Melo (BRA)	0
Ignacio Espinola (ARG)	2
Agustín Ríos (CHI)	0
Yohandri Granado (VEN)	2

Final
Ignacio Espinola (ARG)	0
Yohandri Granado (VEN)	2

Bronze medal match
Agustín Ríos (CHI)	2
Alejandro Tordoya (BOL)	0

Bronze medal match
Paulo Melo (BRA)	2
Franco Moreno (PER)	0

=== Men's 68 kg ===
Round of 16
Fabián Villanueva (BOL)	0
Alejandro Castillo (PER)	2
Juan Gaona (PAR)	0
Jeshuath Pedraza (VEN)	2
Matías López (URU)	2
Samero Doebe (SUR)	1

Quarterfinals
João Victor Diniz (BRA)	2
Alejandro Castillo (PER)	0
Ignacio Morales (CHI)	0
Ian Romero (PAN)	2
Jhon Garrido (COL)	0
Jeshuath Pedraza (VEN)	2
Matías López (URU)	0
José Acuña (ARG)	2

Semifinals
João Victor Diniz (BRA)	2
Ian Romero (PAN)	0
Jeshuath Pedraza (VEN)	0
José Acuña (ARG)	2

Final
João Victor Diniz (BRA)	0
José Acuña (ARG)	2

Bronze medal match
Jeshuath Pedraza (VEN)	2
Alejandro Castillo (PER)	0

Bronze medal match
Ian Romero (PAN)	2
Matías López (URU)	1

=== Men's 80 kg ===
Quarterfinals
Federico González (URU)	0
Santino Policeli (ARG)	2
Miguel Trejos (COL)	2
Juan Montalvo (BOL)	0

Semifinals
Henrique Rodrigues (BRA)	2
Santino Policeli (ARG)	0
Miguel Trejos (COL)	0
Joaquín Curchill (CHI)	2

Final
Henrique Rodrigues (BRA)	2
Joaquín Churchill (CHI)	1

=== Men's +80 kg ===
Quarterfinals
Julio Nazareno (ECU)	0
Mateo Di Leo (ARG)	2
Maicol Solís (COL)	2
Hassani Andrade (PER)	0

Semifinals
Pedro Alves (BRA)	0
Mateo Di Leo (ARG)	2
Maicol Solís (COL)	2
Luis Álvarez (VEN)	0

Final
Mateo Di Leo (ARG)	0
Maicol Solís (COL)	2

Bronze medal match
Luis Álvarez (VEN)	2
Julio Nazareno (ECU)	0

Bronze medal match
Pedro Alves (BRA)	2
Hassani Andrade (PER)	1

=== Men's individual poomsae ===
Round of 16
Georfren Reyes (VEN)	8.048
Julián Ramírez (COL)	8.516

Quarterfinals
Rodrigo Subauste (PER)	8.732
Julián Ramírez (COL)	8.465
Fernando Salgado (ECU)	8.599
Joseph Rodríguez (PAN)	8.299
Fernando Gilette (ARG)	8.416
Lucas Heredia (BOL)	8.282
Rubén Arce (PAR)	8.316
Alex Silva (BRA)	8.382

Semifinals
Rodrigo Subauste (PER)	8.799
Fernando Salgado (ECU)	8.466
Fernando Gilette (ARG)	8.466
Alex Silva (BRA)	8.599

Final
Rodrigo Subauste (PER)	8.799
Alex Silva (BRA)	8.732

=== Women's 49 kg ===
Quarterfinals
Julia Nazário (BRA)	2
Yuliennys Pedraza (VEN)	1
María Grippoli (URU)	2
Priscila Rodríguez (ARG)	2
Ceili Peterson (GUY)	2
María Hurtado (COL)	0
Alessandra Suárez (PER)	0
Andrea Ramírez (COL)	2

Semifinals
Julia Nazário (BRA)	0
María Grippoli (URU)	2
Ceili Peterson (GUY)	0
Andrea Ramírez (COL)	2

Final
María Grippoli (URU)	0
Andrea Ramírez (COL)	2

Bronze medal match
Ceili Peterson (GUY)	2
Priscila Rodríguez (ARG)	0

Bronze medal match
Julia Nazário (BRA)	2
Alessandra Suárez (PER)	0

=== Women's 57 kg ===
Quarterfinals
Maria Clara Pacheco (BRA)	2
Angelyn Saldaña (COL)	0
María Torres (ECU)	1
Alexmar Sulbaran (VEN)	2
Ana Cleonares (PER)	2
Yade Bengsomenggolo (SUR)	0
Brenda Brooks (PAN)	0
María Julia Sepúlveda (ARG)	2

Semifinals
Maria Clara Pacheco (BRA)	2
Alexmar Sulbaran (VEN)	0
Ana Cleonares (PER)	0
María Julia Sepúlveda (ARG)	2

Final
Maria Clara Pacheco (BRA)	2
María Julia Sepúlveda (ARG)	0

Bronze medal match
Angelyn Saldaña (COL)	2
Ana Cleonares (PER)	0

Bronze medal match
Alexmar Sulbaran (VEN)	2
Brenda Brooks (PAN)	0

=== Women's 67 kg ===
Quarterfinals
Mell Mina (ECU)	1
Claudia Gallardo (CHI)	2
Eliana Vásquez (PER)	0
Brenda Ruiz (ARG)	2
Kiara Paz (COL)	2
Hillary Clemente (VEN)	0
Milagros Álvarez (URU)	0
Milena Titoneli (BRA)	2

Semifinals
Claudia Gallardo (CHI)	2
Brenda Ruiz (ARG)	0
Kiara Paz (COL)	0
Milena Titoneli (BRA)	2

Final
Claudia Gallardo (CHI)	0
Milena Titoneli (BRA)	2

Bronze medal match
Mell Mina (ECU)	2
Kiara Paz (COL)	0

Bronze medal match
Brenda Ruiz (ARG)	2
Milagros Álvarez (URU)	0

=== Women's +67 kg ===
Quarterfinals
Mayte Caicedo (ECU)	1
Fernanda Aguirre (CHI)	2
Gloria Mosquera (COL)	2
Maelynn Fradl (ARU)	0
Carolina Fernández (VEN)	0
Victoria Belén Rivas (ARG)	2

Semifinals
Mikaela Oliveira (BRA)	2
Fernanda Aguirre (CHI)	0
Gloria Mosquera (COL)	2
Victoria Belén Rivas (ARG)	0

Final
Mikaela Oliveira (BRA)	0
Gloria Mosquera (COL)	2

Bronze medal match
Victoria Belén Rivas (ARG)	2
Bye

Bronze medal match
Fernanda Aguirre (CHI)	2
Maelynn Fradl (ARU)	0

=== Women's individual poomsae ===
Round of 16
Antonella Chamorro (PAR)	8.366
Monsserrat Patiño (BOL)	7.933
Fernanda Melillo (VEN)	8.299
Nicole Maciel (BRA)	8.216

Quarterfinals
Fabiana Varillas (PER)	8.616
Antonella Chamorro (PAR)	8.299
Clara Ansedes (ARG)	8.316
Katlen Jerves (ECU)	8.116
Daniela Quirama (COL)	8.549
Sofía Briñón (URU)	8.099
Daniela Rodríguez (PAN)	8.215
Nicole Maciel (BRA)	8.399

Semifinals
Fabiana Varillas (PER)	8.599
Clara Ansedes (ARG)	8.249
Daniela Quirama (COL)	8.682
Nicole Maciel (BRA)	8.366

Final
Fabiana Varillas (PER)	8.832
Daniela Quirama (COL)	8.733

=== Mixed poomsae pairs ===
Round of 16
Dariana Suache (COL); Isaac Vélez (COL)	8.649
Alex Silva (BRA); Nicole Maciel (BRA)	8.433

Quarterfinals
Dariana Suache (COL); Isaac Vélez (COL)	8.499
Rubi Alvarado (BOL); Jhoel Limachi (BOL)	7.933
Nancy Haidar (VEN); Aaron Bolívar (VEN)	8.300
Rodrigo Subauste (PER); Fabiana Varillas (PER)	8.683
Lester Mota (ECU); Lissette Segura (ECU)	8.399
Clara Ansedes (ARG); Fernando Gilette (ARG)	8.449
Jaesson Garay (PAR); Andrea Gómez (PAR)	8.199
Joseph Rodríguez (PAN); Daniela Rodríguez (PAR)	8.149

Semifinals
Dariana Suache (COL); Isaac Vélez (COL)	8.499
Rodrigo Subauste (PER); Fabiana Varillas (PER)	8.599
Clara Ansedes (ARG); Fernando Gilette (ARG)	8.449
Jaesson Garay (PAR); Andrea Gómez (PAR)	7.549

Final
Rodrigo Subauste (PER); Fabiana Varillas (PER)	8.766
Clara Ansedes (ARG); Fernando Gilette (ARG)	8.232

=== Mixed poomsae freestyle teams ===
Rank	Name	Nation	Time
1st place, gold medalist(s)	Katlen Jerves; Fernando Salgado; Lester Mota; Lissette Segura; Mario Troya	Ecuador	7.999
2nd place, silver medalist(s)	Daniela Quirama; Dariana Suache; Michael Mejía; Julián Ramírez; Isaac Vélez	Colombia	7.766
3rd place, bronze medalist(s)	Nancy Haidar; Fernanda Melillo; Georfren Reyes; Bryan González; Aaron Bolívar	Venezuela	7.366
3rd place, bronze medalist(s)	Jaesson Garay; Antonella Chamorro; Rubén Arce; Andrea Gómez; Taekyo Priore	Paraguay	6.899
5	Kelvin Cusi; Rubi Alvarado; Monsserrat Patiño; Jhoel Limachi; Lucas Heredia	Bolivia	5.033
