= Taekwondo at the 2018 Asian Games – Women's +67 kg =

Taekwondo competition

Women's +67 kg at the 2018 Asian Games
- Venue: Jakarta Convention Center
- Date: 21 August 2018
- Competitors: 15 from 15 nations

Medalists
gold medal	Lee Da-bin	South Korea
silver medal	Cansel Deniz	Kazakhstan
bronze medal	Gao Pan	China
bronze medal	Svetlana Osipova	Uzbekistan

The women's heavyweight (+67 kilograms) event at the 2018 Asian Games took place on 21 August 2018 at Jakarta Convention Center Plenary Hall, Jakarta, Indonesia.

A total of fifteen competitors from fifteen countries competed in this event, limited to fighters whose body weight was more than 67 kilograms.

Lee Da-bin of South Korea won the gold medal. She beat Cansel Deniz of Kazakhstan 27–21 in the gold medal match.

Gao Pan and Svetlana Osipova, from China and Uzbekistan respectively, finished third and won the bronze medal.

== Schedule ==
All times are Western Indonesia Time (UTC+07:00)

Date	Time	Event
Tuesday, 21 August 2018	09:00	Round of 16
Tuesday, 21 August 2018	09:00	Quarterfinals
Tuesday, 21 August 2018	15:00	Semifinals
Tuesday, 21 August 2018	15:00	Final

== Results ==
Legend

- DQ — Won by disqualification
- W — Won by withdrawal

Round of 16
Lham Tshering (BHU)	DQ
Mokhru Khalimova (TJK)
Ma Ting-hsia (TPE)	5
Rodali Barua (IND)	0
Nisha Rawal (NEP)	6
Gao Pan (CHN)	22
Zahra Pouresmaeil (IRI)	3
Svetlana Osipova (UZB)	6
Ranuri Wickramasinghe (SRI)
Sorn Seavmey (CAM)	W
Delva Rizki (INA)	3
Lâm Thị Hà Thanh (VIE)	5
Kirstie Alora (PHI)	7
Cansel Deniz (KAZ)	8

Quarterfinals
Lee Da-bin (KOR)	24
Lham Tshering (BHU)	0
Ma Ting-hsia (TPE)	0
Gao Pan (CHN)	3
Svetlana Osipova (UZB)	5
Sorn Seavmey (CAM)	3
Lâm Thị Hà Thanh (VIE)	1
Cansel Deniz (KAZ)	16

Semifinals
Lee Da-bin (KOR)	25
Gao Pan (CHN)	8
Svetlana Osipova (UZB)	3
Cansel Deniz (KAZ)	19

Final
Lee Da-bin (KOR)	27
Cansel Deniz (KAZ)	21
