= Yanna Schneider =

German taekwondoin (born 1996)

Personal information
- Nationality: German
- Born: 18 April 1996 (age 30) Bonn, Germany
- Height: 1.80 m (5 ft 11 in)

Sport
- Country: Germany
- Sport: Taekwondo
- Event: –73 kg
- Club: Taekwondo Verein Swisttal e.V.
- Team: GER
- Coached by: Dimitrios Lautenschläger

Achievements and titles
- World finals: 1st place, gold medalist(s)
- Regional finals: 2nd place, silver medalist(s)
- Highest world ranking: 5 (2022)
Medal record
Women's taekwondo
Representing Germany
European Championships
| Bronze medal – third place | 2024 Belgrade | 73 kg |
European Under 21 Championships
| Bronze medal – third place | 2015 Bucharest | 73 kg |
World Junior Championships
| Gold medal – first place | 2012 Sharm El Sheikh | 63 kg |
European Junior Championships
| Silver medal – second place | 2011 Paphos | 59 kg |
| Bronze medal – third place | 2013 Porto | 63 kg |
- Updated on 22 May 2024

Yanna Schneider (born 18 April 1996) is a German taekwondo athlete.

== Career ==
Schneider started practising the Korean martial arts taekwondo at the age of seven and has been part of the German national team since 2010.

In 2011, Schneider claimed a silver medal at the European Junior Championships in Paphos in the 59 kg weight class, and in 2012 she became world champion in the weight class up to 63 kg at the World Junior Championships in Sharm El Sheikh. In 2013, she won a bronze medal at the European Junior Championships held in Porto. She won another European bronze medal at the European U21 Championships in Bucharest in 2015.

During her active career, Schneider has won 43 bronze medals, 22 silver medals and nine gold medals at international tournaments. She has been German champion eight times, runner-up five and bronze medallist twice.

At the 2024 European Championships in Belgrade, Schneider won the quarter-finals against russian athlete Polina Khan, lost to Sude Yaren Uzunçavdar from Turkey in the semi-finals and thus won a bronze medal in the 73 kg competition.

== Education ==
Schneider completed a Bachelor's degree and subsequently a Master's degree in Business Psychology at the Bonn-Rhein-Sieg University of Applied Sciences.
