= Kristina Adebaio =

Russian taekwondo practitioner (born 2002)

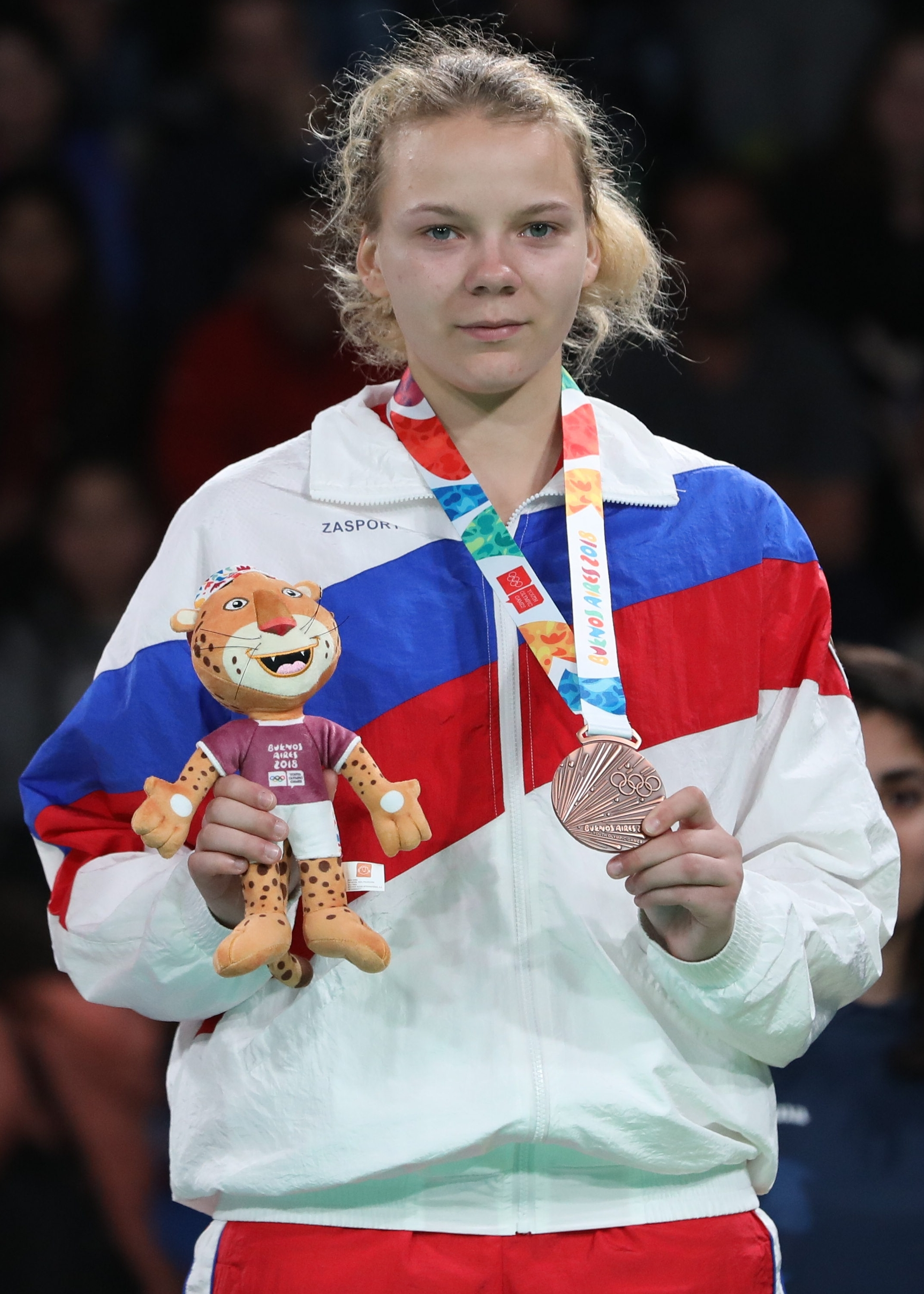

Personal information
- Full name: Kristina Danielevna Adebaio
- Nationality: Russia
- Born: January 19, 2002 (age 24)

Sport
- Sport: Taekwondo
Medal record
Women's taekwondo
Representing Individual Neutral Athletes
World Championships
Bronze medal – third place	2023 Baku	+73 kg
European Championships
Bronze medal – third place	2024 Belgrade	+73 kg
Representing Russia
Youth Olympic Games
Bronze medal – third place	2018 Buenos Aires	+63 kg
European Junior Championships
Gold medal – first place	2019 Valencia

Kristina Danielevna Adebaio (Russian: Кристина Даниэлевна Адебайо; born 19 January 2002) is a Russian taekwondo practitioner. She competed at the 2023 World Taekwondo Championships, winning the bronze medal in the women's heavyweight event. She also competed at the 2024 European Taekwondo Championships, winning the bronze medal in the +73 kg event.
