= Taekwondo at the 2014 Asian Games – Women's 62 kg =

Taekwondo competition

Women's 62 kg at the 2014 Asian Games
- Venue: Ganghwa Dolmens Gymnasium
- Date: 2 October 2014
- Competitors: 10 from 10 nations

Medalists
gold medal	Lee Da-bin	South Korea
silver medal	Zhang Hua	China
bronze medal	Chuang Chia-chia	Chinese Taipei
bronze medal	Phạm Thị Thu Hiền	Vietnam

The women's lightweight (62 kilograms) event at the 2014 Asian Games took place on 2 October 2014 at Ganghwa Dolmens Gymnasium, Incheon, South Korea.

A total of ten competitors from ten different countries (NOCs) competed in this event, limited to fighters whose body weight was less than 62 kilograms.

Lee Da-bin of South korea won the gold medal.

== Schedule ==
All times are Korea Standard Time (UTC+09:00)

Date	Time	Event
Thursday, 2 October 2014	09:30	Round of 16
Thursday, 2 October 2014	15:30	Quarterfinals
Thursday, 2 October 2014	15:30	Semifinals
Thursday, 2 October 2014	18:00	Final

== Results ==
Legend

- W — Won by withdrawal

Round of 16
Manita Shahi (NEP)	1
Chuang Chia-chia (TPE)	13
Phạm Thị Thu Hiền (VIE)	5
Feng Xiao (MAC)	4

Quarterfinals
Rekha Ranee Gogoi (IND)	0
Chuang Chia-chia (TPE)	15
Zhang Hua (CHN)	19^{W}
Sarah Al-Modhahkah (KUW)	0
Assel Koilybay (KAZ)	2
Lee Da-bin (KOR)	11
Phạm Thị Thu Hiền (VIE)	2
Nancy Abu Bader (JOR)	0

Semifinals
Chuang Chia-chia (TPE)	2
Zhang Hua (CHN)	5
Lee Da-bin (KOR)	9
Phạm Thị Thu Hiền (VIE)	2

Final
Zhang Hua (CHN)	7
Lee Da-bin (KOR)	8
