= Taekwondo at the 2023 European Games – Women's 73 kg =

Taekwondo competition

Women's 73 kg at the 2023 European Games
- Venue: Krynica-Zdrój Arena
- Date: 26 June
- Competitors: 15 from 15 nations

Medalists
gold medal	Sude Yaren Uzunçavdar	Turkey
silver medal	Nadica Božanić	Serbia
bronze medal	Nika Klepac	Croatia
bronze medal	Althéa Laurin	France

The women's 73 kg competition in taekwondo at the 2023 European Games took place on 26 June at the Krynica-Zdrój Arena.

== Schedule ==
All times are Central European Summer Time (UTC+2).

Date	Time	Event
Monday, 26 June 2023	09:24	Round of 16
Monday, 26 June 2023	14:00	Quarterfinals
Monday, 26 June 2023	15:36	Semifinals
Monday, 26 June 2023	16:48	Repechage
Monday, 26 June 2023	19:00	Bronze medal bouts
Monday, 26 June 2023	20:00	Final

== Results ==
Round of 16
Paraskevi Ntemogianni (GRE)	2	1
Maristella Smiraglia (ITA)	9	5
Alema Hadžić (GER)	0	6
Anđela Berišaj (MNE)	4	8
Iryna Pypot (UKR)	0	0
Marcelina Koszel (POL)	6	5
Rebecca McGowan (GBR)	1	7
Eliza Frazier Haugen (NOR)	1	4
Anamarija Georgievska (MKD)	3	1
Nika Klepac (CRO)	16	5
Sude Yaren Uzunçavdar (TUR)	7	9
Rebeka Füredi (HUN)	0	0
Souzanna Tomazou (CYP)	1	2
Althéa Laurin (FRA)	6	14

Quarterfinals
Nadica Božanić (SRB)	0	11	10
Maristella Smiraglia (ITA)	7^{P}	1	4
Anđela Berišaj (MNE)	0	5	6
Marcelina Koszel (POL)	5	2	4
Rebecca McGowan (GBR)	WD
Nika Klepac (CRO)
Sude Yaren Uzunçavdar (TUR)	5	3
Althéa Laurin (FRA)	4	3

Semifinals
Nadica Božanić (SRB)	5	13
Anđela Berišaj (MNE)	1	6
Nika Klepac (CRO)	0	0
Sude Yaren Uzunçavdar (TUR)	1	4

Final
Nadica Božanić (SRB)	2	9
Sude Yaren Uzunçavdar (TUR)	3	15

=== Repechage ===
Repechage			Bronze medal bout
			Nika Klepac (CRO)	4	6
			Maristella Smiraglia (ITA)	3	3
Rebeka Füredi (HUN)	4	3
Althéa Laurin (FRA)	16	8	Althéa Laurin (FRA)	11	15
			Anđela Berišaj (MNE)	2	1
