= 2024 European Taekwondo Championships – Women's +73 kg =

Women's +73 kg at the 2024 European Taekwondo Championships
- Venue: Belgrade Fair – Hall 1
- Location: Belgrade, Serbia
- Dates: 10 May
- Competitors: 15 from 15 nations

Medalists
gold medal	Lorena Brandl	Germany
silver medal	Nafia Kuş	Turkey
bronze medal	Kristina Adebaio
bronze medal	Rebecca McGowan	Great Britain

The women's +73 kg competition at the 2024 European Taekwondo Championships was held on 10 May 2024.

== Results ==
Round of 16
Dana Azran (ISR)	1
Marlene Zahl (AUT)	2
Solène Avoulète (FRA)	2
Viktorija Helviga (LAT)	0
Magdalena Matić (CRO)	0
Rebecca McGowan (GBR)	2
Lorena Brandl (GER)	2
Mariia Kuts (UKR)	0
Agoritsa Kitsiou (GRE)	1
Tania Castiñeira (ESP)	2
Aleksandra Kowalczuk (POL)	1
Kristina Adebaio (AIN)	2
Jasmin Andersen (DEN)	0
Bianca Cook (IMN)	2

Quarterfinals
Nafia Kuş (TUR)	2
Marlene Zahl (AUT)	0
Solène Avoulète (FRA)	1
Rebecca McGowan (GBR)	2
Lorena Brandl (GER)	2
Tania Castiñeira (ESP)	1
Kristina Adebaio (AIN)	2
Bianca Cook (IMN)	0

Semifinals
Nafia Kuş (TUR)	2
Rebecca McGowan (GBR)	1
Lorena Brandl (GER)	2
Kristina Adebaio (AIN)	1

Final
Nafia Kuş (TUR)	1
Lorena Brandl (GER)	2
