= Cansel Deniz =

Kazakhstan taekwondo practitioner

Personal information
- Nationality: Kazakhstani
- Born: 26 August 1991 (age 34) Stepnogorsk, Kazakh SSR, Soviet Union
- Height: 177 cm (5 ft 10 in)

Sport
- Sport: Taekwondo

Achievements and titles
- Highest world ranking: 2022 April World Taekwondo Ranking number 1.
Medal record
Women's Taekwondo
Representing Kazakhstan
World Cup Team Championships
| Bronze medal – third place | 2018 Fujairah | Mixed team |
Asian Games
| Silver medal – second place | 2018 Jakarta–Palembang | +67 kg |
| Bronze medal – third place | 2022 Hangzhou | +67 kg |
Asian Championships
| Silver medal – second place | 2021 Beirut | 73kg |
| Silver medal – second place | 2022 Chuncheon | 73kg |
Islamic Solidarity Games
| Bronze medal – third place | 2017 Baku | 73 kg |
| Bronze medal – third place | 2021 Konya | 73 kg |
Summer Universiade
| Silver medal – second place | 2017 Taipei | 73 kg |

Cansel Deniz (Жансель Дениз, also transliterated Zhansel Deniz, born 26 August 1991) is a Kazakh taekwondo practitioner.

== Career ==
She represented Kazakhstan at the 2016 Summer Olympics in Rio de Janeiro, in the women's −67 kg and at the 2020 Summer Olympics in Tokyo, in the women's + 67 kg.

At the 2018 Asian Games, she clinched a silver medal in the women's +67 kg event losing to South Korean Lee Da-bin.

In 2023, she competed in the women's middleweight event at the World Taekwondo Championships held in Baku, Azerbaijan. She then took part in the 2022 Asian Games and won the bronze medal in the women's +67 kg.
