= Madelynn Gorman-Shore =

American taekwondo athlete

Personal information
- Nationality: American
- Born: 1999 (age 26–27) Denver, Colorado, U.S.
- Height: 5 ft 11 in (180 cm)
- Weight: 73 kg (161 lb)

Sport
- Country: United States
- Sport: Taekwondo
- Event: –67 kg
- Club: The Rock Taekwondo
- Team: USA
- Coached by: Darin Carr
Medal record
Representing United States
Pan American Games
Gold medal – first place	2023 Santiago	+67 kg
Bronze medal – third place	2019 Lima	+67 kg
Grand Slam
Silver medal – second place	2018 Wuxi	+67 kg
Pan American Championships
Bronze medal – third place	2016 Queretaro	73 kg
Bronze medal – third place	2018 Spokane	73 kg
- Updated on December 16, 2018

Madelynn Gorman-Shore (born 1999) is an American taekwondo athlete. She won the silver medal at the 2018 World Taekwondo Grand Slam on the women's heavyweight's. As of the December 2018 World Taekwondo rankings, Gorman-Shore is currently ranked 5th in the women's -73 kg. division.

In 2023, she competed in the women's middleweight event at the World Taekwondo Championships held in Baku, Azerbaijan.
