= Rebecca McGowan =

British taekwondo practitioner

Rebecca Sinden
Personal information
- Born: Rebecca McGowan; 27 May 2000 (age 26) Dumbarton, Scotland
- Spouse: Bradly Sinden

Sport
- Country: Scotland
- Sport: Taekwondo
- Weight class: +67 kg, +73 kg

Achievements and titles
- World finals: (silver) 2023 Baku
- Regional finals: (gold) 2021 Sofia
Medal record
Women's taekwondo
Representing Great Britain
World Championships
Silver medal – second place	2023 Baku	+73 kg
Bronze medal – third place	2022 Guadalajara	+73 kg
Grand Prix
Silver medal – second place	2022 Paris	+67 kg
Silver medal – second place	2023 Manchester (F)	+67 kg
Bronze medal – third place	2022 Rome	+67 kg
Bronze medal – third place	2023 Rome	+67 kg
European Championships
Gold medal – first place	2021 Sofia	+73 kg
Bronze medal – third place	2022 Manchester	+73 kg
Bronze medal – third place	2024 Belgrade	+73 kg
Bronze medal – third place	2026 Munich	73 kg
World Junior Championships
Bronze medal – third place	2016 Burnaby	+68 kg

Rebecca Sinden (née McGowan, born 27 May 2000) is a Scottish taekwondo practitioner. She is twice a medalist in the women's +73 kg event at the World Taekwondo Championships. She is also three-times a medalist, including gold, in this event at the European Taekwondo Championships.

== Career ==
In 2019, McGowan competed in the women's middleweight event at the World Taekwondo Championships held in Manchester, United Kingdom. She won the gold medal in the women's +73 kg event at the 2021 European Taekwondo Championships held in Sofia, Bulgaria. She defeated Milica Mandić of Serbia in her gold medal match.

McGowan won one of the bronze medals in her event at the 2022 European Taekwondo Championships held in Manchester. She also won one of the bronze medals in the women's middleweight event at the 2022 World Taekwondo Championships held in Guadalajara, Mexico.

In 2023, McGowan won the silver medal in the women's middleweight event at the World Taekwondo Championships held in Baku, Azerbaijan. A month later, she competed in the women's +73 kg event at the 2023 European Games held in Poland.

At the 2023 Grand Prix Finale in Manchester, McGowan won the silver medal in the +67 kg event, thus securing the United Kingdom's spot for the 2024 Olympic Games for the women's +67 weight class competition due to her being placed fourth in the Olympic ranking. In July 2024, she was nominated to represent Great Britain at the Olympic Games in Paris.

== Tournament record ==
Year	Event	Location	Place
2021	European Championships	(Bulgaria) Sofia	1st
2022	European Championships	(United Kingdom) Manchester	3rd
2022	World Championships	(Mexico) Guadalajara	3rd
2022	Grand Prix	(Italy) Rome	3rd
2022	Grand Prix	(France) Paris	2nd
2023	World Championships	(Azerbaijan) Baku	2nd
2023	Grand Prix	(Italy) Rome	3rd
2023	Grand Prix (F)	(United Kingdom) Manchester	2nd
2024	European Championships	(Serbia) Belgrade	3rd
2024	Summer Olympics	Paris	5th

== Personal life ==
She is studying for a degree in Physiotherapy from the University of Salford.
