= Nafia Kuş =

Turkish taekwondo practitioner (born 1995)

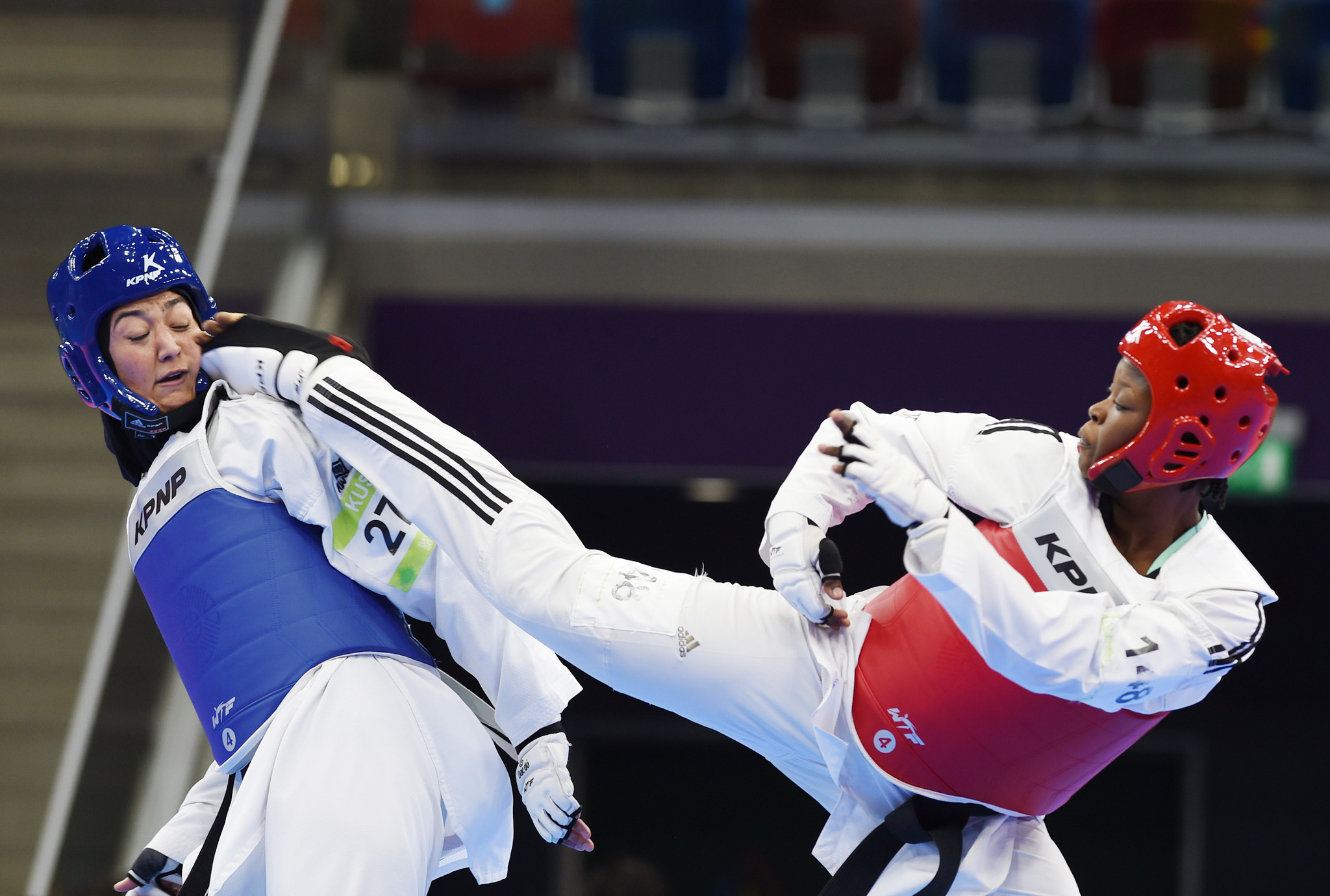
- Kuş (blue) in final of 2017 Islamic Solidarity Games

Personal information
- Full name: Nafia Kuş Aydın
- Nationality: Turkish
- Born: February 20, 1995 (age 31) Adana, Turkey
- Home town: Adana, Turkey
- Height: 185 cm (6 ft 1 in)

Sport
- Country: Turkey
- Sport: Taekwondo, kickboxing
- Event: Lightweight
- College team: Hacettepe University
- Club: Istanbul BB SK
Medal record
Women's taekwondo
Representing Turkey
Olympic Games
Bronze medal – third place	2024 Paris	+67 kg
World Championships
Gold medal – first place	2023 Baku	+73 kg
Gold medal – first place	2025 Wuxi	+73 kg
Bronze medal – third place	2019 Manchester	-73 kg
Bronze medal – third place	2015 Chelyabinsk	+73 kg
European Championships
Gold medal – first place	2018 Kazan	73 kg
Silver medal – second place	2024 Belgrade	+73 kg
Silver medal – second place	2016 Montreux	+73 kg
Bronze medal – third place	2022 Manchester	+73 kg
Bronze medal – third place	2026 Munich	+73 kg
European Games
Gold medal – first place	2023 Krakow	+73 kg
Grand Slam
Bronze medal – third place	2017 Wuxi	+67 kg
Grand Prix
Gold medal – first place	2015 Moscow	+67 kg
Silver medal – second place	2018 Moscow	+67 kg
Bronze medal – third place	2015 Manchester	+67 kg
Bronze medal – third place	2018 Taoyuan	+67 kg
Bronze medal – third place	2018 Fujairah (F)	+67 kg
Bronze medal – third place	2022 Paris	+67 kg
Bronze medal – third place	2022 Riyadh (F)	+67 kg
Islamic Solidarity Games
Gold medal – first place	2017 Baku	+73 kg
Silver medal – second place	2013 Palembang	+73 kg
Bronze medal – third place	2021 Konya	+73 kg
Mediterranean Games
Gold medal – first place	2022 Oran	+67 kg
Bronze medal – third place	2018 Tarragona	+67 kg
World University Games
Gold medal – first place	2019 Neapel	-73 kg
European U21 Championships
Gold medal – first place	2013 Chișinău	+73 kg
Gold medal – first place	2015 Bucharest	73 kg
Bronze medal – third place	2012 Athens	+73 kg
World Junior Championships
Silver medal – second place	2010 Tijuana	+68 kg
Bronze medal – third place	2012 Sharm El-Sheikh	+68 kg
European Junior Championships
Bronze medal – third place	2011 Paphos	+68 kg
European Cadet Championships
Silver medal – second place	2009 Zagreb	+59 kg

Nafia Kuş Aydın (born 20 February 1995) is a world and European champion Turkish female taekwondo practitioner competing in the heavyweight division. She won the gold medal in the women's heavyweight event at the 2023 World Taekwondo Championships and 2025 World Taekwondo Championships.

== Career ==
Kuş is a native of Adana, Turkey. She has been performing taekwondo since age 8. Currently, Kuş is studying Physical Education and Sports at Çukurova University in Adana.

In 2013, she obtained the silver medal at the Islamic Solidarity Games held in Palembang, Indonesia. Kuş won the silver medal at the 2014 World University Taekwondo Championships in Hohhot, China. She became gold medalist at the European Junior Championship in Innsbruck, Austria in 2014, and continued her success by winning another gold medals at tournaments in 2015 including Dutch Open in Antalya, and Moldova Open in Chișinău.

She won the gold medal at the 1st ETU European Championships Olympic weight categories held in Nalchik, Russia in 2015. Nafia Kuş won a bronze medal at the 2015 World Taekwondo Championships held in Chelyabinsk, Russia. She won the gold medal in the +73 kg division at the 2015 Dutch Open Tournament in Eindhoven. At the 2020 German Open Tournament in Hamburg, she became gold medalist in the +73 kg division. Kuş took the gold medal in the -73 kg division at the 8th Turkish Open Tournament held in Istanbul.

She won the gold medal in the women's +67 kg event at the 2022 Mediterranean Games held in Oran, Algeria.

Nafia Kuş won the gold medal at the 2023 World Taekwondo Championships held in Baku, Azerbaijan, in the women's +73 kg, defeating Greek athlete Paraskevi Ntemogianni in the first round, Reba Stewart from Australia in the second round, Gloria Mosquera from Colombia in the quarterfinals and Russian athlete Kristina Adebaio in the semifinals. In the +73 kg final, she fought with Uzbek last world champion Svetlana Osipova. Nafia Kuş, who also defeated Svetlana Osipova, won the gold medal and became the world champion.

== Tournament record ==
Year	Event	Location	G-Rank	Place
2022	European Championships	(United Kingdom) Manchester	G-4	3rd
2022	Spanish Open	(Spain) La Nucia	G-1	1st
2022	Turkish Open	(Turkey) Antalya	G-1	1st
2022	WT Presidents Cup - Europe	(Albania) Durrës	G-1	1st
2021	Turkish Open	(Turkey) Istanbul	G-1	1st
2021	Bosnia Herzegovina Open	(Bosnia and Herzegovina) Sarajevo	G-1	1st
2020	WT Presidents Cup - Europe	(Sweden) Helsingborg	G-1	2nd
2020	European Clubs Championships	(Croatia) Zagreb	G-1	2nd
2020	Fujairah Open	(United Arab Emirates) Fujairah	G-1	1st
2020	German Open	(Germany) Hamburg	G-1	1st
2019	World Championships	(United Kingdom) Manchester	G-12	3rd
2019	Universiade	(Italy) Naples	G-4	1st
2019	Extra European Championships	(Italy) Bari	G-4	3rd
2019	WT Presidents Cup - Europe	(Turkey) Antalya	G-1	2nd
2019	Dutch Open	(Netherlands) Nijmegen	G-1	2nd
2019	Belgian Open	(Belgium) Lommel	G-1	3rd
2019	US Open	(United States) Las Vegas	G-1	3rd
2019	Asian Open	(Vietnam) Ho Chi Minh City	G-1	3rd
2018	European Championships	(Russia) Kazan	G-4	1st
2018	Grand Prix	(Russia) Moscow	G-4	2nd
2018	Grand Prix	(Chinese Taipei) Taoyuan	G-4	3rd
2018	Grand Prix	(United Arab Emirates) Fujairah	G-8	3rd
2018	Grand Slam - Qualification	(China) Wuxi	G-4	2nd
2018	Turkish Open	(Turkey) Istanbul	G-1	1st
2018	Egypt Open	(Egypt) Alexandria	G-1	1st
2018	Belgian Open	(Belgium) Lommel	G-1	1st
2018	Sofia Open	(Bulgaria) Sofia	G-1	1st
2018	WT Presidents Cup - Europe	(Greece) Athens	G-1	1st
2017	Grand Slam	(China) Wuxi	G-12	3rd
2017	European Clubs Championships	(Turkey) Antalya	G-1	1st
2017	Dutch Open	(Netherlands) Eindhoven	G-1	1st
2017	Turkish Open	(Turkey) Antalya	G-1	2nd
2017	Slovenia Open	(Slovenia) Maribor	G-1	2nd
2017	German Open	(Germany) Hamburg	G-1	2nd
2016	European Championships	(France) Montreaux	G-4	2nd
2016	European Clubs Championships	(Turkey) Antalya	G-1	1st
2016	Dutch Open	(Netherlands) Eindhoven	G-1	2nd
2016	Luxembourg Open	Luxembourg	G-1	2nd
2015	World Championships	(Morocco) Rabat	G-12	3rd
2015	Grand Prix	(Russia) Moscow	G-4	1st
2015	Grand Prix	(United Kingdom) Manchester	G-4	3rd
2015	European U21 Championships	(Romania) Bucharest	G-4	1st
2015	Dutch Open	(Netherlands) Eindhoven	G-1	1st
2015	Ukraine Open	(Ukraine) Kharkiv	G-1	1st
2015	Moldova Open	(Moldova) Chișinău	G-1	1st
2015	Turkish Open	(Turkey) Antalya	G-1	2nd
2015	European Clubs Championships	(Turkey) Antalya	G-1	2nd
2014	Student World Championships	(China) Hohhot	G-12	1st
2014	European Clubs Championships	(Turkey) Antalya	G-1	1st
2014	Turkish Open	(Turkey) Antalya	G-1	3rd
2013	European U-21 Championships	(Moldova) Chișinău	G-1	1st
2012	World Junior Championships	(Egypt) Sharm El-Sheikh	G-12	3rd
2012	European U-21 Championships	(Greece) Athens	G-4	3rd
2012	German Open	(Germany) Hamburg	G-1	1st
2011	European Junior Championships	(Cyprus) Pafos	G-4	3rd
2011	Spanish Open	(Spain) Alicante	G-1	1st
2011	German Open	(Greece) Hamburg	G-1	3rd
2010	World Junior Championships	(Mexico) Tijuana	G-12	2nd
2009	European Cadets Championships	(Croatia) Zagreb	G-4	2nd
