= Polina Khan =

Russian taekwondoin (born 1999)

Personal information
- Nationality: (Russia) Russian
- Born: Polina Stanislavovna Khan; 31 December 1999 (age 26) Rostov-on-Don, Russia
- Height: 176 cm (5 ft 9 in)
- Weight: 67 kg (148 lb)

Sport
- Country: Russia
- Sport: Taekwondo
- Event: –73 kg
- Club: Grandmaster Club
- Team: RUS
- Coached by: Stanislav Khan
Medal record
Women's taekwondo
Representing Individual Neutral Athletes
World Championships
Bronze medal – third place	2023 Baku	73 kg
Representing Russia
European Championships
Bronze medal – third place	2018 Kazan	67 kg
Bronze medal – third place	2021 Sofia	73 kg
Grand Prix
Silver medal – second place	2018 Taoyuan	67 kg
World Junior Championships
Silver medal – second place	2016 Burnaby	68 kg
- Updated on 19 September 2018

Polina Stanislavovna Khan (Russian: Полина Станиславовна Хан; born 31 December 1999) is a Russian taekwondo athlete. She won the bronze medal at the 2018 European Taekwondo Championships on the women's 67 kg weight category.

In 2023, she won one of the bronze medals in the women's middleweight event at the World Taekwondo Championships held in Baku, Azerbaijan.
