= Zhou Zeqi (taekwondo) =

Chinese taekwondo practitioner (born 1999)

Personal information
- Born: 25 September 1999 (age 26)

Sport
- Sport: Taekwondo
Medal record
Representing China
World Championships
Bronze medal – third place	2025 Wuxi	73 kg
Asian Games
Gold medal – first place	2022 Hangzhou	+67 kg
Gold medal – first place	2022 Hangzhou	Mixed team
Asian Championships
Silver medal – second place	2022 Chuncheon	73 kg
Bronze medal – third place	2026 Ulaanbaatar	+73 kg
Universiade
Gold medal – first place	2021 Chengdu	73 kg
Gold medal – first place	2021 Chengdu	Team Kyorugi

Zhou Zeqi 周澤琪 (born 25 September 1999) is a Chinese taekwondo practitioner. She won gold at the 2022 Asian Games and competed at the 2024 Paris Olympics.

== Career ==
She won gold in the -73 kg at the 2021 Summer World University Games in Chengdu. She won silver at the 2022 Asian Taekwondo Championships in South Korea in the +73 kg.

She won bronze in the Rome leg of the 2023 World Taekwondo Grand Prix in the +67 category. She won the gold medal at the delayed 2022 Asian Games in Hangzhou in September 2023 in the Women's +67 kg division. She also won gold in the Mixed team event at the Games.

She was selected for the 2024 Paris Olympics competing in the +67kg, reaching the quarter-finals. In October 2025, she was a bronze medalist at the 2025 World Taekwondo Championships in the women's middleweight division in Wuxi, China.
