= Fatima-Ezzahra Aboufaras =

Moroccan taekwondo practitioner

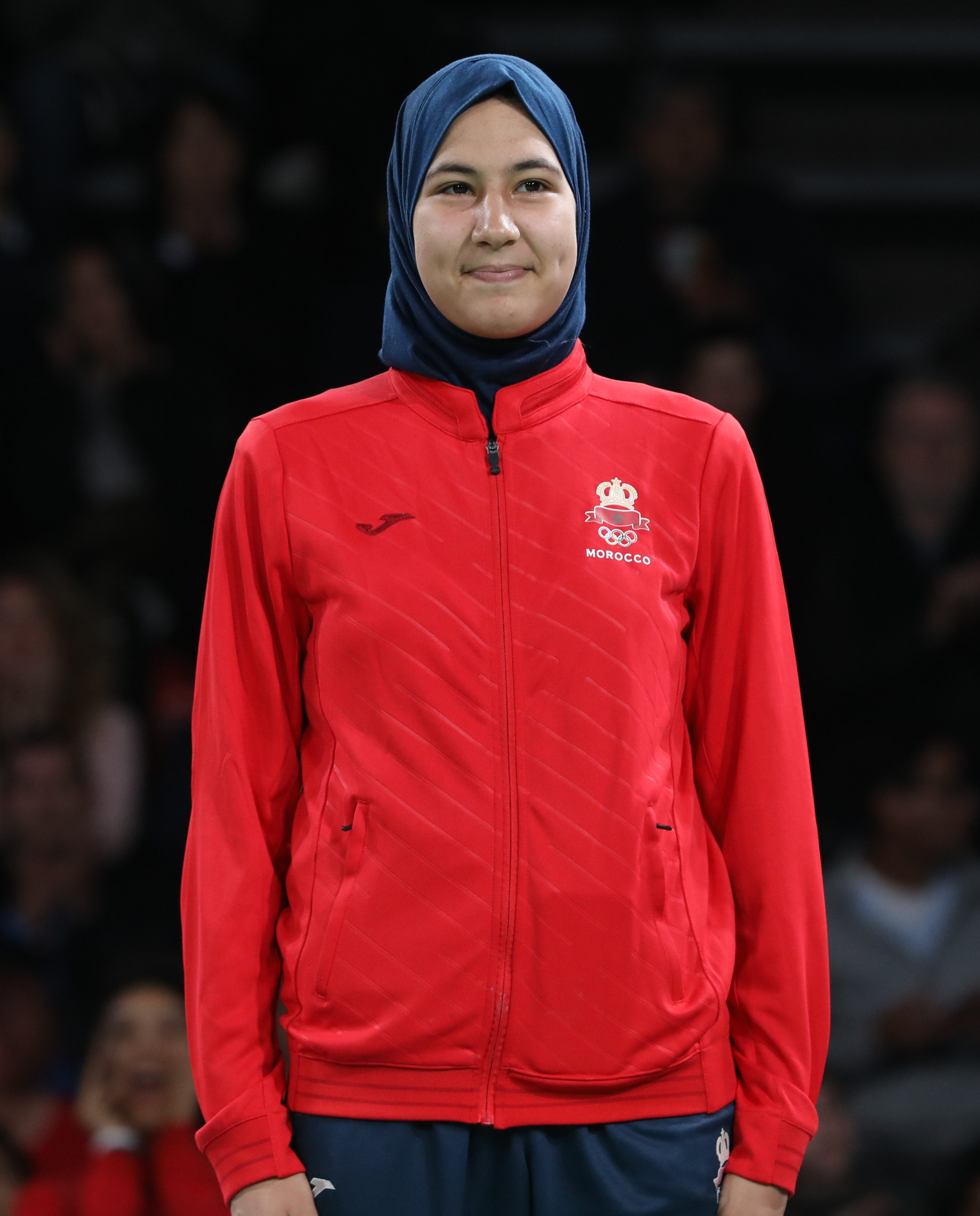
- Fatima-Ezzahra Aboufaras (2018)

Personal information
- Born: 28 February 2002 (age 24)

Sport
- Country: Morocco
- Sport: Taekwondo
Medal record
Representing Morocco
Summer Youth Olympics
Gold medal – first place	2018 Buenos Aires	+63 kg
African Games
Gold medal – first place	2019 Rabat	+73 kg
Gold medal – first place	2023 Accra	+73 kg
African Taekwondo Championships
Gold medal – first place	2022 Kigali	+73 kg
Gold medal – first place	2023 Abidjan	+73 kg
African Youth Games
Gold medal – first place	2018 Alger	+67 kg
Mediterranean Games
Silver medal – second place	2022 Oran	+67 kg
Islamic Solidarity Games
Bronze medal – third place	2021 Konya	+73 kg

Fatima-Ezzahra Aboufaras (born 28 February 2002) is a Moroccan taekwondo practitioner. She represented Morocco at the 2019 African Games held in Rabat, Morocco and she won the gold medal in the women's +73 kg event.

At the 2018 Summer Youth Olympics held in Buenos Aires, Argentina, she won the gold medal in the +63 kg event. In the final, she defeated Kimia Hemati of Iran.

She won the gold medal in the women's +73 kg event at the 2022 African Taekwondo Championships held in Kigali, Rwanda.
