= Lee Da-bin =

South Korean taekwondo practitioner

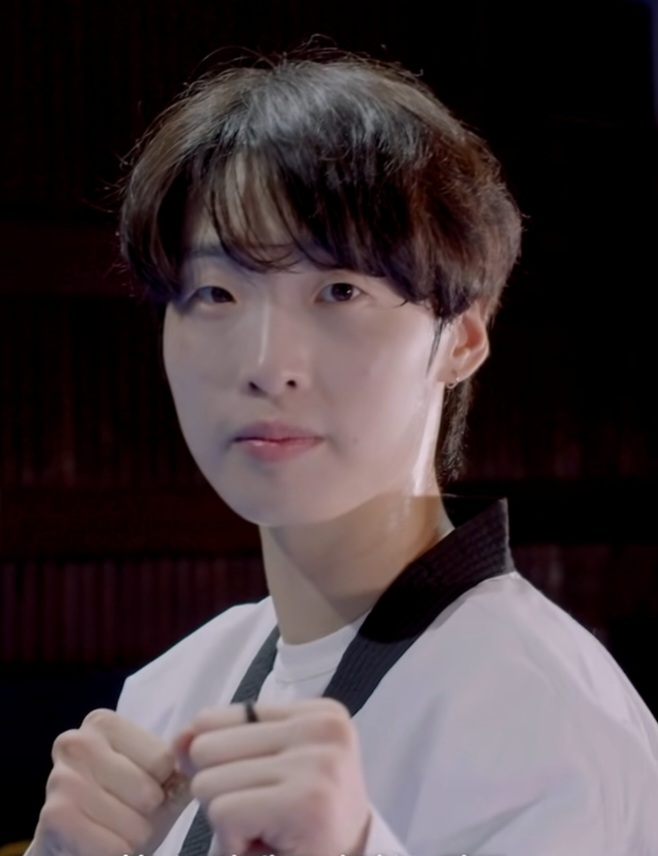
- Lee in 2021

Personal information
- Nationality: South Korean
- Born: 7 December 1996 (age 29) Ulsan, South Korea
- Height: 177 cm (5 ft 10 in)

Sport
- Country: South Korea
- Sport: Taekwondo
- Event: 73 kg
Medal record
Women's taekwondo
Representing South Korea
Olympic Games
Silver medal – second place	2020 Tokyo	+67 kg
Bronze medal – third place	2024 Paris	+67 kg
World Championships
Gold medal – first place	2019 Manchester	73 kg
Silver medal – second place	2022 Guadalajara	73 kg
Grand Prix
Gold medal – first place	2018 Taoyuan	+67 kg
Gold medal – first place	2019 Rome	+67 kg
Gold medal – first place	2022 Rome	+67 kg
Gold medal – first place	2022 Paris	+67 kg
Silver medal – second place	2017 Abidjan (F)	+67 kg
Bronze medal – third place	2017 Moscow	+67 kg
Bronze medal – third place	2017 London	+67 kg
Bronze medal – third place	2018 Rome	+67 kg
Bronze medal – third place	2023 Paris	+67 kg
Bronze medal – third place	2023 Taiyuan	+67 kg
Asian Games
Gold medal – first place	2014 Incheon	62 kg
Gold medal – first place	2018 Jakarta	+67 kg
Silver medal – second place	2022 Hangzhou	+67 kg
Asian Championships
Gold medal – first place	2016 Pasay	73 kg
Bronze medal – third place	2018 Ho Chi Minh City	73 kg
Universiade
Gold medal – first place	2017 Taoyuan	73 kg
Bronze medal – third place	2015 Gwangju	Team Kyorugi
Bronze medal – third place	2017 Taoyuan	Team Kyorugi

Korean name
- Hangul: 이다빈
- RR: I Dabin
- MR: I Tabin
- Updated on 19 September 2018

Lee Da-bin (Korean: 이다빈; born 7 December 1996) is a South Korean taekwondo practitioner. She competes for South Korea mainly in middleweight category at international competitions.

Lee Da-bin represented South Korea at the Asian Games in 2014 and 2018. She clinched a gold medal in the women's 62kg event during the 2014 Asian Games. Four years later, she clinched another gold medal in the women's +67kg event defeating Kazakhstani Cansel Deniz during the 2018 Asian Games. She became a world champion in the women's middleweight event at the 2019 World Taekwondo Championships.

She represented South Korea at the 2020 Summer Olympics which also marked her debut appearance at the Olympics. She qualified to the women's 67 kg event final after a nail biting last second win over Britain's Bianca Walkden. She lost the gold medal match to Serbia's Milica Mandic in the women's 67kg taekwondo event.

She won the silver medal in the women's middleweight event at the 2022 World Taekwondo Championships held in Guadalajara, Mexico. In 2023, she competed in the women's middleweight event at the World Taekwondo Championships held in Baku, Azerbaijan.
