= Sude Yaren Uzunçavdar =

Turkish taekwondo practitioner (born 2005)

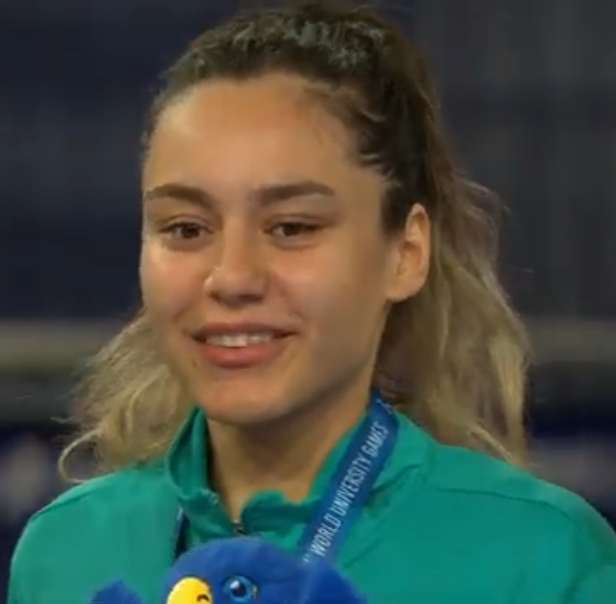
- Uzunçavdar at the 2025 Summer World University Games

Personal information
- Nationality: Turkish
- Born: 20 October 2005 (age 20)

Sport
- Sport: Taekwondo
- Weight class: 73 kg
Medal record
Women's taekwondo
Representing Turkey
World Championships
Bronze medal – third place	2025 Wuxi	73 kg
European Championships
Silver medal – second place	2024 Belgrade	73 kg
Silver medal – second place	2026 Munich	73 kg
European Games
Gold medal – first place	2023 Krakow	73 kg
Islamic Solidarity Games
Gold medal – first place	2021 Konya	73 kg
Gold medal – first place	2025 Riyadh	73 kg
Mediterranean Games
Gold medal – first place	2026 Taranto	+67 kg
World University Games
Gold medal – first place	2025 Rhine-Ruhr	73 kg
World Junior Championships
Gold medal – first place	2022 Sofia	68 kg

Sude Yaren Uzunçavdar (born 20 October 2005) is a Turkish taekwondo practitioner. She is a European Games, Mediterranean Games, Islamic Solidarity Games and Summer World University Games gold medalist.

== Career ==
In August 2022, Uzunçavdar competed at the 2022 World Taekwondo Junior Championships and won a gold medal in the 68 kg category.

In June 2023, she competed at the 2023 European Games and won a gold medal in the 73 kg category. In May 2024, she competed at the 2024 European Taekwondo Championships and won a silver medal in the 73 kg category, losing to Althéa Laurin in the final.

In July 2025, she competed at the 2025 Summer World University Games and won a gold medal in the 73 kg category. In October 2025, she competed at the 2025 World Taekwondo Championships and won a bronze medal in the 73 kg category. The next month she competed at the 2025 Islamic Solidarity Games and won a gold medal in the 70 kg category.

In May 2026, she competed at the 2026 European Taekwondo Championships and won a silver medal in the 73 kg category, losing to Sarah Chaâri in the finals. In August 2026, she competed at the 2026 Mediterranean Games and won a gold medal in the 67 kg category.

== Personal life ==
Uzunçavdar comes from a taekwondo family. Her father, Serkan Uzunçavdar, is a former athlete who is currently a taekwondo coach for the national team. Her grandmother is a trainer and her aunt is a former practitioner. She is the oldest of four children. Her sister, Sıla Irmak Uzunçavdar, is also a taekwondo practitioner.
