= Crystal Weekes =

Puerto Rican taekwondo practitioner

Personal information
- Full name: Crystal Weekes González
- Nickname: Bam Bam
- Nationality: Puerto Rican
- Born: January 14, 1998 (age 28) United States
- Height: 5 ft 10 in (178 cm)
- Weight: 161 lb (73 kg)

Sport
- Country: Puerto Rico
- Sport: Taekwondo
- Event: +67 kg
Medal record
Women's taekwondo
Representing Puerto Rico
World Championships
Bronze medal – third place	2022 Guadalajara	73 kg
Grand Prix
Silver medal – second place	2022 Rome	+67kg
Pan American Championships
Bronze medal – third place	2016 Queretaro	73 kg
- Updated on 20 December 2022

Crystal Weekes González is a Puerto Rican taekwondo practitioner. She won one of the bronze medals in the women's middleweight event at the 2022 World Taekwondo Championships held in Guadalajara, Mexico.

== Junior career ==
Weekes is a two-time junior world champion and two-time junior Pan American champion.

== Senior career ==
At the 2016 Pan American Taekwondo Olympic Qualification Tournament she finished 2nd in the heavyweight division to earn a spot at the 2016 Olympics.

In 2023, she competed in the women's middleweight event at the World Taekwondo Championships held in Baku, Azerbaijan.

== Personal life ==
She is from New York City, but has a Puerto Rican grandfather. She holds the nickname of "Bam Bam."
