= Althéa Laurin =

French taekwondo practitioner

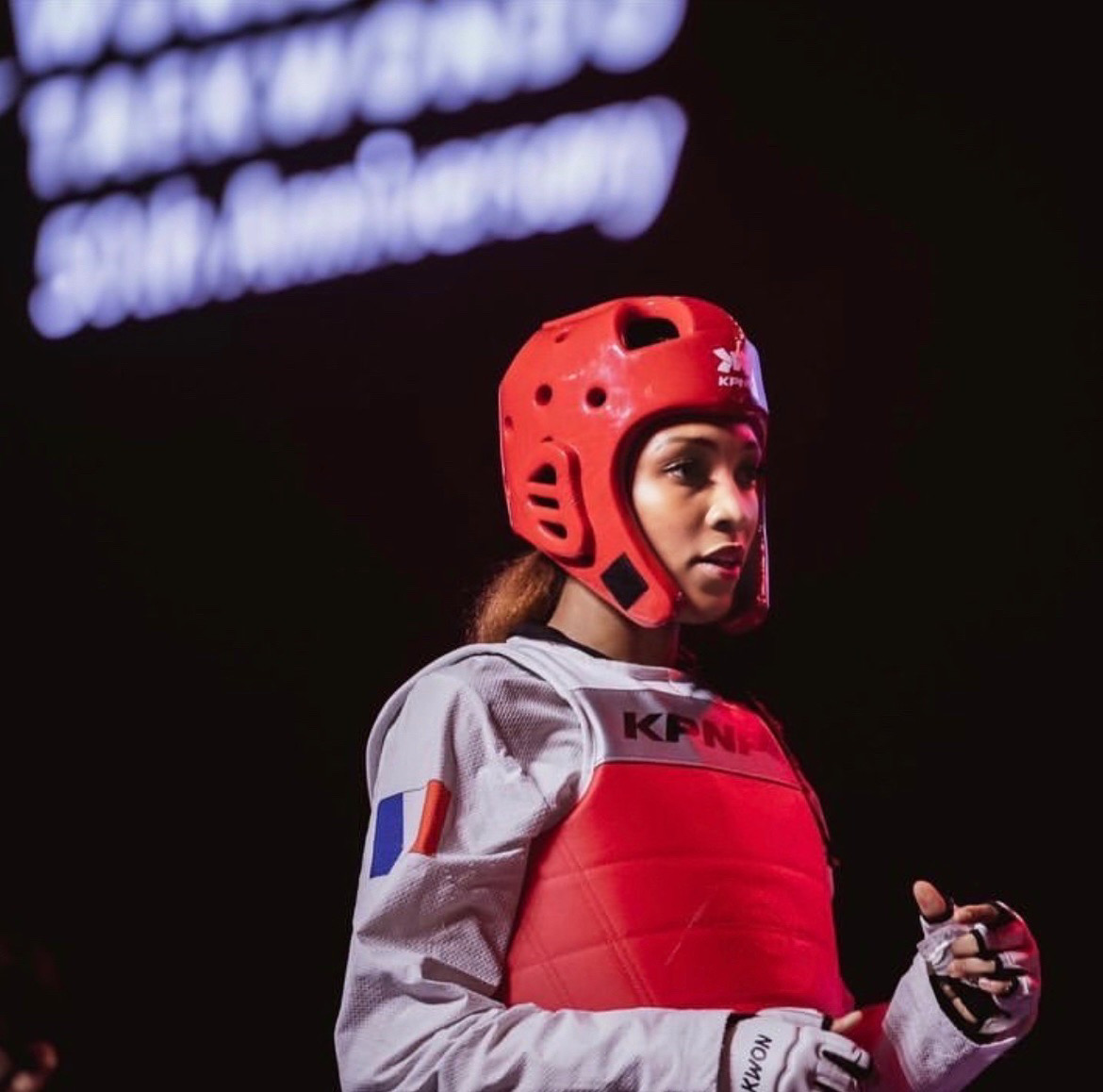
- Laurin at the 2023 World Championships in Baku

Medal record

Representing France

Women's taekwondo

Olympic Games
Gold medal – first place	2024 Paris	+67 kg
Bronze medal – third place	2020 Tokyo	+67 kg

World Championships
Gold medal – first place	2023 Baku	73 kg

Grand Prix
Gold medal – first place	2023 Paris	+67kg
Silver medal – second place	2022 Paris	+67kg
Silver medal – second place	2022 Manchester	+67kg

European Games
Bronze medal – third place	2023 Kraków-Małopolska	73 kg

European Championships
Gold medal – first place	2022 Manchester	73 kg
Gold medal – first place	2024 Belgrade	73 kg

Mediterranean Games
Silver medal – second place	2018 Tarragona	67 kg
Bronze medal – third place	2022 Oran	+67 kg

Althéa Laurin (born 1 September 2001) is a French taekwondo athlete competing in the middleweight division. She won the gold medal at the 2024 Paris Olympics and a bronze medal at the Tokyo Olympic Games, both in the women + 67 kg. She has been made Knight of the National Order of Merit.

== Career ==
Laurin made her debut internationally in 2016. The following year, she won the European Taekwondo Junior Championships in Larnaca and then the gold medal at the 2018 Junior World Championship in Hammamet. She made her Olympic debut representing France at the 2020 Summer Olympics at 19 years old.

She was selected for the 2020 Summer Olympics – Women's +67 kg where she defeated the Mexican fighter Briseida Acosta in the opening round and Olympic champion Zheng Shuyin in the second round. She lost against Milica Mandic and overcame Aminata Traoré in the repechage to secure a bronze Olympic medal.

She won the gold medal in her event at the 2022 European Taekwondo Championships held in Manchester, United Kingdom.

She won the bronze medal in the women's +67 kg event at the 2022 Mediterranean Games held in Oran, Algeria.

In 2023, Laurin won the gold medal in the women's middleweight event at the World Taekwondo Championships held in Baku, Azerbaijan. She defeated Rebecca McGowan of Great Britain in her gold medal match.

In July 2023, she ranked number one in both world and Olympic rankings with a total of 477 points.

In June 2026 she was banned from competition for twenty months due to three whereabouts failures within twelve months, with all results from September 2025 expunged. Laurin blamed the missed drug tests on a faulty intercom at her home. The ban runs until October 9, 2027.

== Distinctions ==
In March 2024, the French Embassy in Korea named one of its hall after Laurin's name.

Orders

- Knight of the Legion of Honour: 2024
- In 2021, she was appointed Knight of the National Order of Merit.

== Personal life ==
Laurin was born in Saint-Denis, in the Seine-Saint-Denis department, into a family with roots in the French overseas department of Martinique.
