= Astan Bathily =

Ivorian taekwondo practitioner (born 1999)

Personal information
- Full name: Astan Katherine Féghé Bathily
- Born: 23 February 1999 (age 27) Abidjan, Ivory Coast

Sport
- Country: Ivory Coast
- Sport: Taekwondo
- Weight class: +67 kg
Medal record
Women's taekwondo
Representing Ivory Coast
African Games
Silver medal – second place	2023 Accra	73 kg

Astan Katherine Féghé Bathily (born 23 February 1999) is an Ivorian taekwondo practitioner. She represented Ivory Coast at the 2024 Summer Olympics.

== Career ==
She competed at the 2023 African Games in Accra, and won a silver medal in the 73 kg event.

In February 2024, she competed at the 2024 African Qualification Tournament in Dakar, Senegal. She won her semifinal match and qualified to represent Ivory Coast at the 2024 Summer Olympics.
