= 2023 World Taekwondo Championships =

Taekwondo competition

- Venue: Baku Crystal Hall
- Location: Baku, Azerbaijan
- Dates: 29 May – 4 June 2023
- Competitors: 921 from 144 nations

Champions
- Men: South Korea
- Women: Turkey

The 2023 World Taekwondo Championships was the 26th edition of the World Taekwondo Championships and was held in Baku, Azerbaijan from 29 May to 4 June, 2023. This was the first time that Azerbaijan held the event.

== Competition schedule ==
All times are (UTC+4:00)

Date	Time	Event
29 May	09.00-14.00	Qualification rounds: M-68 & W-57
29 May	15:00-16.30	Round of 16 and QF: M-68 & W-57
29 May	18.30-20.30	Semi-finals, Finals & Awarding: M-68 & W-57
30 May	09.00-14.00	Qualification rounds: M-58 & W-67 & W-73
30 May	15:00-16.30	Round of 16 and QF: M-58 & W-67 & W-73
30 May	18.00-20.30	Semi-finals, Finals & Awarding: M-58 - W-67 - W-73
31 May	09.00-14.00	Qualification rounds: M-80 & M-87 & W-49
31 May	15:00-16.30	Round of 16 and QF: M-80 & W-87 & W-49
31 May	18.00-20.30	Semi-finals, Finals & Awarding: M-80 & W-87 & W-49
1 June	09.00-12.30	Qualification rounds: M-63 & W-+73
1 June	15:00-16.30	Round of 16 and QF: M-63 & W-+73
1 June	18.00-20.30	Semi-finals, Finals & Awarding: M-63 & W-+73
2 June	09.00-12.30	Qualification rounds: M-54 & W-46
2 June	15:00-16.30	Round of 16 and QF: M-54 & W-46
2 June	18.00-20.30	Semi-finals, Finals & Awarding: M-54 & W-46
3 June	09.00-12.30	Qualification rounds: M-74 & W-62
3 June	15:00-16.30	Round of 16 and QF: M-74 & W-62
3 June	18.00-20.30	Semi-finals, Finals & Awarding: M-74 & W-62
4 June	09.00-12.30	Qualification rounds: M- +87 & W-53
4 June	15:00-16.30	Round of 16 and QF: M- +87 & W-53
4 June	18.00-20.30	Semi-finals, Finals & Awarding: M- +87 & W-53

== Medal table ==
* Host nation (Azerbaijan)

Rank	Nation	Gold	Silver	Bronze	Total
1	South Korea	3	1	0	4
2	Turkey	3	0	3	6
3	Croatia	2	1	3	6
4	France	2	0	0	2
–	Individual Neutral Athletes ^{a}	1	1	5	7
5	Great Britain	1	1	2	4
6	Iran	1	0	2	3
7	Ivory Coast	1	0	1	2
8	Hungary	1	0	0	1
8	Italy	1	0	0	1
10	Thailand	0	3	0	3
11	Spain	0	1	3	4
11	Uzbekistan	0	1	3	4
13	Brazil	0	1	1	2
13	China	0	1	1	2
13	Jordan	0	1	1	2
13	Mexico	0	1	1	2
17	Chinese Taipei	0	1	0	1
17	Serbia	0	1	0	1
17	United States	0	1	0	1
20	Egypt	0	0	2	2
21	Australia	0	0	1	1
21	Colombia	0	0	1	1
21	Japan	0	0	1	1
21	Norway	0	0	1	1
Totals (24 entries)		16	16	32	64

== Russian and Belarusian participation ==
a In accordance with sanctions imposed following by the 2022 Russian invasion of Ukraine, taekwondo athletes from Russia and Belarus were not permitted to use the name, flag, or anthem of Russia or Belarus. They instead participated as "Individual Neutral Athletes (AIN)", their medals were not included in the official medal table. In general, 23 Russian and Belarusian athletes were allowed to compete in the event as Individual Neutral Athletes following the International Olympic Committee recommendations, while two Russian athletes (2020 Olympic Champions Maksim Khramtsov and Vladislav Larin) were barred due to their explicit support for the invasion. Nevertheless, in protest against participation of Individual Neutral Athletes, the Ukrainian team withdrew from the championships. In general, Individual Neutral Athletes won 1 gold, 1 silver and 5 bronze medals: athletes from Russia (Kristina Adebaio, Kadyrbech Daurov, Polina Khan, Liliia Khuzina and Tatiana Minina) won 1 gold and 4 bronze medals while athletes from Belarus (Georgii Gurtsiev and Artsiom Plonis) – 1 silver and 1 bronze medal.

== Medal summary ==
=== Men ===
Event	Gold	Silver	Bronze
Finweight (−54 kg)	Park Tae-joon; South Korea	Hugo Arillo; Spain	Omonjon Otajonov; Uzbekistan
Finweight (−54 kg)	Park Tae-joon; South Korea	Hugo Arillo; Spain	Görkem Polat; Turkey
Flyweight (−58 kg)	Bae Jun-seo; South Korea	Georgii Gurtsiev; Individual Neutral Athletes	Mahmoud Al-Taryreh; Jordan
Flyweight (−58 kg)	Bae Jun-seo; South Korea	Georgii Gurtsiev; Individual Neutral Athletes	Adrián Vicente; Spain
Bantamweight (−63 kg)	Hakan Reçber; Turkey	Banlung Tubtimdang; Thailand	Carlos Navarro; Mexico
Bantamweight (−63 kg)	Hakan Reçber; Turkey	Banlung Tubtimdang; Thailand	Joan Jorquera; Spain
Featherweight (−68 kg)	Bradly Sinden; Great Britain	Jin Ho-jun; South Korea	Matin Rezaei; Iran
Featherweight (−68 kg)	Bradly Sinden; Great Britain	Jin Ho-jun; South Korea	Ulugbek Rashitov; Uzbekistan
Lightweight (−74 kg)	Marko Golubić; Croatia	Stefan Takov; Serbia	Leon Sejranovic; Australia
Lightweight (−74 kg)	Marko Golubić; Croatia	Stefan Takov; Serbia	Kadyrbech Daurov; Individual Neutral Athletes
Welterweight (−80 kg)	Simone Alessio; Italy	CJ Nickolas; United States	Miguel Trejos; Colombia
Welterweight (−80 kg)	Simone Alessio; Italy	CJ Nickolas; United States	Seif Eissa; Egypt
Middleweight (−87 kg)	Kang Sang-hyun; South Korea	Ivan Šapina; Croatia	Arian Salimi; Iran
Middleweight (−87 kg)	Kang Sang-hyun; South Korea	Ivan Šapina; Croatia	Artsiom Plonis; Individual Neutral Athletes
Heavyweight (+87 kg)	Cheick Sallah Cissé; Ivory Coast	Carlos Sansores; Mexico	Emre Kutalmış Ateşli; Turkey
Heavyweight (+87 kg)	Cheick Sallah Cissé; Ivory Coast	Carlos Sansores; Mexico	Paško Božić; Croatia

=== Women ===
Event	Gold	Silver	Bronze
Finweight (−46 kg)	Lena Stojković; Croatia	Kamonchanok Seeken; Thailand	Ruka Okamoto; Japan
Finweight (−46 kg)	Lena Stojković; Croatia	Kamonchanok Seeken; Thailand	Wang Xiaolu; China
Flyweight (−49 kg)	Merve Dinçel; Turkey	Panipak Wongpattanakit; Thailand	Adriana Cerezo; Spain
Flyweight (−49 kg)	Merve Dinçel; Turkey	Panipak Wongpattanakit; Thailand	Bruna Duvančić; Croatia
Bantamweight (−53 kg)	Nahid Kiani; Iran	Zuo Ju; China	Shahd El-Hosseiny; Egypt
Bantamweight (−53 kg)	Nahid Kiani; Iran	Zuo Ju; China	Tatiana Minina; Individual Neutral Athletes
Featherweight (−57 kg)	Luana Márton; Hungary	Lo Chia-ling; Chinese Taipei	Maria Clara Pacheco; Brazil
Featherweight (−57 kg)	Luana Márton; Hungary	Lo Chia-ling; Chinese Taipei	Hatice Kübra İlgün; Turkey
Lightweight (−62 kg)	Liliia Khuzina; Individual Neutral Athletes	Caroline Santos; Brazil	Aaliyah Powell; Great Britain
Lightweight (−62 kg)	Liliia Khuzina; Individual Neutral Athletes	Caroline Santos; Brazil	Feruza Sadikova; Uzbekistan
Welterweight (−67 kg)	Magda Wiet-Hénin; France	Julyana Al-Sadeq; Jordan	Mari Romundset Nilsen; Norway
Welterweight (−67 kg)	Magda Wiet-Hénin; France	Julyana Al-Sadeq; Jordan	Ruth Gbagbi; Ivory Coast
Middleweight (−73 kg)	Althéa Laurin; France	Rebecca McGowan; Great Britain	Matea Jelić; Croatia
Middleweight (−73 kg)	Althéa Laurin; France	Rebecca McGowan; Great Britain	Polina Khan; Individual Neutral Athletes
Heavyweight (+73 kg)	Nafia Kuş; Turkey	Svetlana Osipova; Uzbekistan	Bianca Cook; Great Britain
Heavyweight (+73 kg)	Nafia Kuş; Turkey	Svetlana Osipova; Uzbekistan	Kristina Adebaio; Individual Neutral Athletes

== Team ranking ==
=== Men ===
Rank	Team	Points
1	South Korea	448
2	Croatia	217
3	Turkey	188
4	Italy	140
5	Ivory Coast	137
6	Great Britain	134
7	Spain	114
8	Mexico	93
9	United States	70
10	Uzbekistan	65

=== Women ===
Rank	Team	Points
1	Turkey	288
2	France	256
3	Croatia	187
4	Hungary	136
5	Iran	134
6	Thailand	115
7	Great Britain	111
8	China	94
8	Uzbekistan	94
10	Brazil	89

== Participating nations ==
921 athletes from 144 nations registered to compete at the 2023 championships.

- Afghanistan (8)
- Albania (3)
- Algeria (1)
- Angola (4)
- Andorra (1)
- Argentina (7)
- Australia (16)
- Austria (3)
- Azerbaijan (13)
- Bahrain (4)
- Bangladesh (1)
- Barbados (1)
- Belgium (4)
- Bolivia (1)
- Bosnia and Herzegovina (8)
- Botswana (2)
- Brazil (16)
- Bulgaria (10)
- Burkina Faso (4)
- Burundi (3)
- Cambodia (2)
- Cameroon (8)
- Canada (16)
- Cape Verde (3)
- Chad (1)
- Chile (6)
- China (16)
- Chinese Taipei (16)
- Colombia (15)
- Costa Rica (2)
- Croatia (15)
- Cyprus (8)
- Czech Republic (6)
- Democratic Republic of the Congo (4)
- Denmark (8)
- Djibouti (1)
- Dominican Republic (2)
- Ecuador (6)
- Egypt (12)
- Estonia (4)
- Eswatini (2)
- Ethiopia (2)
- Faroe Islands (1)
- Finland (5)
- France (10)
- French Polynesia (2)
- Gabon (6)
- Gambia (1)
- Georgia (6)
- Germany (11)
- Ghana (2)
- Great Britain (11)
- Greece (16)
- Guatemala (2)
- Guinea-Bissau (1)
- Guyana (1)
- Haiti (10)
- Hong Kong (6)
- Hungary (8)
- India (16)
- Individual Neutral Athletes (23)
- Indonesia (2)
- Iran (15)
- Iraq (2)
- Ireland (6)
- Isle of Man (1)
- Israel (10)
- Italy (14)
- Ivory Coast (10)
- Jamaica (1)
- Japan (9)
- Jordan (10)
- Kazakhstan (16)
- Kenya (6)
- Kiribati (1)
- Kosovo (6)
- Kuwait (2)
- Kyrgyzstan (8)
- Latvia (2)
- Lebanon (8)
- Lesotho (1)
- Lithuania (3)
- Luxembourg (1)
- Malawi (1)
- Malaysia (2)
- Mali (9)
- Martinique (1)
- Mexico (16)
- Moldova (3)
- Mongolia (8)
- Montenegro (3)
- Morocco (15)
- Mozambique (4)
- Nepal (8)
- Netherlands (5)
- New Zealand (4)
- Nicaragua (2)
- Niger (9)
- Nigeria (4)
- North Macedonia (2)
- Norway (4)
- Pakistan (4)
- Palestine (5)
- Panama (2)
- Papua New Guinea (1)
- Peru (2)
- Philippines (9)
- Poland (11)
- Portugal (13)
- Puerto Rico (14)
- Qatar (2)
- Refugee Team (13)
- Republic of the Congo (2)
- Romania (7)
- Rwanda (7)
- San Marino (3)
- Saudi Arabia (7)
- Senegal (7)
- Serbia (11)
- Sierra Leone (2)
- Slovakia (2)
- Slovenia (4)
- Solomon Islands (2)
- Somalia (3)
- South Korea (16)
- Spain (16)
- Sri Lanka (2)
- Sudan (2)
- Sweden (10)
- Switzerland (1)
- Syria (4)
- Thailand (8)
- Tonga (2)
- Trinidad and Tobago (2)
- Tunisia (7)
- Turkey (16)
- United Arab Emirates (2)
- Uruguay (2)
- United States (16)
- Uzbekistan (13)
- Venezuela (4)
- Vietnam (5)
- Zimbabwe (1)

== See also ==
- List of World Championships medalists in taekwondo (men)
- List of World Championships medalists in taekwondo (women)
