= Nguyễn Thị Mộng Quỳnh =

Vietnamese Taekwondo athlete (born 1998)

Personal information
- Nationality: Vietnam
- Born: Nguyễn Thị Mộng Quỳnh; 11 May 1998 (age 28) Ho Chi Minh City, Vietnam
- Occupation: Athletes Taekwondo

Sport
- Sport: Taekwondo

Medal record

Professional Taekwondo athlete

Representing Vietnam

SEA Games
Gold medal – first place	2019 Philippines	Individual freestyle poomsae
Gold medal – first place	2023 Cambodia	Team freestyle poomsae

Nguyễn Thị Mộng Quỳnh (born 11 May 1998) is a Vietnamese Taekwondo athlete. She is a member of the Vietnam national Taekwondo team.

== Biography ==
Nguyễn Thị Mộng Quỳnh started practicing Taekwondo at the age of seven with the goal of improving her health.

In third grade, despite having trained for only one year, Quỳnh was selected by her coach to compete in a district-level Taekwondo competition for students. She won the gold medal in her first competition. Mộng Quỳnh was subsequently sent to the district's Sports Center for training to compete at the city level, where she again won the gold medal in her first competition.

For the next two consecutive years, while still in primary school, Quỳnh won various gold, silver, and bronze medals at city-level competitions. In sixth grade, she was called up by the Ho Chi Minh City Training and Competition Center to begin competing at the national level, and subsequently won numerous medals for the city.

== Career ==
She was an international Taekwondo master for four consecutive years, from 2013 to 2016. She won one gold medal and one silver medal at the 2014 World Taekwondo Junior Championships in Mexico, a silver medal in the women's individual freestyle poomsae event, and a gold medal in the U-17 mixed pair event at the 2015 Asian Junior and Cadet Taekwondo Championships in Taiwan. She also won four gold medals at the International Taekwondo Club Championships in 2012, 2013, 2014, and 2015, as well as a gold medal at the 2016 French Open Taekwondo International Championships.

On 12 May 2023, in the final of the team freestyle poomsae event, Nguyễn Ngọc Minh Hy, Nguyễn Thị Mộng Quỳnh, Hứa Văn Huy, Châu Tuyết Vân, and Trần Đăng Khoa won the gold medal at the 2023 Southeast Asian Games.

== Selected achievements ==
=== Sport ===
Year	Competition	Location	Result	Source
2012	International Taekwondo Club Championships	Indonesia	Gold medal	
2013	Asian Junior Taekwondo Championships	Indonesia	Gold medal	
2013	International Taekwondo Club Championships	Indonesia	Gold medal	
2014	International Taekwondo Club Championships		Gold medal	
2014	World Taekwondo Junior Championships	Mexico	Gold medal	
2014	World Taekwondo Junior Championships	Mexico	Silver medal	
2015	International Taekwondo Club Championships		Gold medal	
2015	Junior Taekwondo Championships	Taiwan	Gold medal	
2015	Asian Cadet Championships	Taiwan	Gold medal	
2016	French Open Taekwondo International Championships	France	Gold medal	
2019	2019 Southeast Asian Games	Philippines	Gold medal	
2023	SEA Games 32	Cambodia	Gold medal	
