= Trần Hồ Duy =

Vietnamese Taekwondo athlete

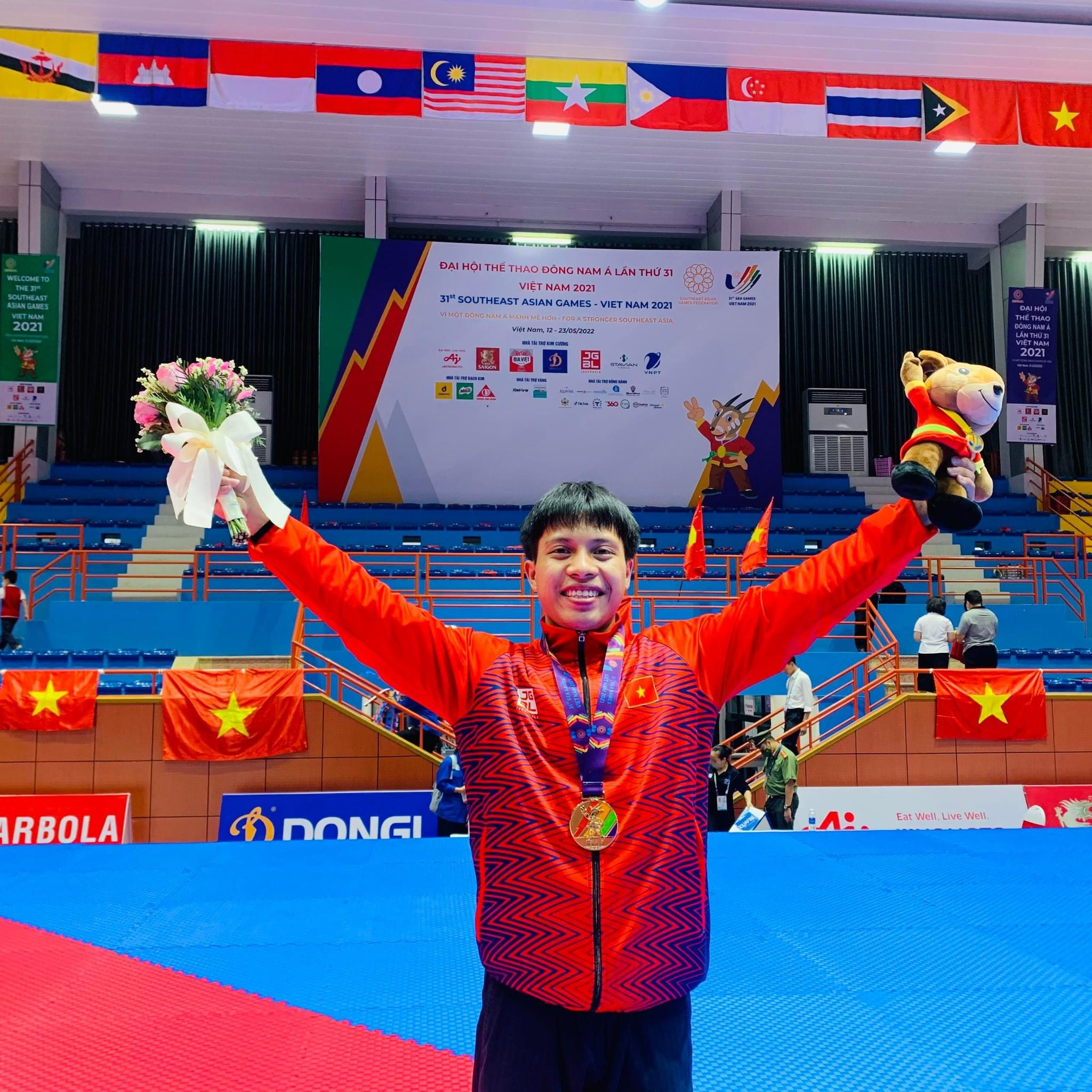
- Trần Hồ Duy

Personal information
- Nationality: Vietnam
- Born: Trần Hồ Duy; 4 February 2001 (age 25) Ho Chi Minh City, Vietnam
- Occupation: Athlete taekwondo

Medal record

Professional Taekwondo athlete

Representing Vietnam

SEA Games
Gold medal – first place	2019 Philippines	Men's team poomsae
Gold medal – first place	2022 Vietnam	Men's team standard poomsae

Trần Hồ Duy (born 4 February 2001) is a Vietnamese Taekwondo athlete. He is a member of the Vietnam national Taekwondo team.

== Career ==
Trần Hồ Duy, Châu Tuyết Vân, Nguyễn Thị Lệ Kim, Hứa Văn Huy, and Nguyễn Ngọc Minh Hy won the gold medal in the mixed team freestyle poomsae event at the 2019 Southeast Asian Games.

Trần Hồ Duy, Nguyễn Đình Khôi, and Nguyễn Thiên Phụng won the gold medal in the men's team standard poomsae event at the 2021 Southeast Asian Games.

== Selected achievements ==
=== Sport ===
Year	Competition	Location	Result	Source
2019	2019 Southeast Asian Games	Philippines	Gold medal	
2022	2021 Southeast Asian Games	Philippines	Gold medal	
