= Nguyễn Thị Lệ Kim =

- Nguyễn Thị Lệ Kim

Personal information
- Nationality: Vietnam
- Born: Nguyễn Thị Lệ Kim; 1 July 1992 (age 34) Binh Thuan, Vietnam
- Occupation: Athletes Taekwondo
- Years active: 2009–

Sport
- Sport: Taekwondo

Medal record

Professional Taekwondo athlete

Representing Vietnam

SEA Games
Silver medal – second place	2011 Indonesia	Women's team poomsae
Gold medal – first place	2013 Myanmar	Women's team poomsae
Gold medal – first place	2015 Singapore	Women's team poomsae
Gold medal – first place	2017 Malaysia	Women's team poomsae
Gold medal – first place	2019 Philippines	Women's team poomsae

Nguyễn Thị Lệ Kim (born 1 July 1992) is a Vietnamese Taekwondo athlete. She is a member of the Vietnam national Taekwondo team and has won six world gold medals, five Asian gold medals, and four SEA Games gold medals in Taekwondo.

== Biography ==
Kim is from Tánh Linh (district), Bình Thuận Province. She was born into a farming family, to her mother Lâm Thị Hoà Thới, and her father Nguyễn Đình Sơn. Kim was introduced to Taekwondo at the age of 10 after witnessing her older brother practice martial arts.

== Career ==
=== 2010 ===
In 2010, under the guidance of coach Nguyễn Thanh Huy, Kim began developing her abilities in the women's individual poomsae event. At the age of 18, she and the Bình Thuận poomsae team won the silver medal in the women's team event at the National Sports Festival.

=== 2011 ===
At her first Southeast Asian Games in 2011, Kim won a silver medal. She subsequently suffered an injury and nearly retired from competition.

=== 2012 ===
After returning to competition, Kim won two gold medals at the Asian University Taekwondo Championships and the World Military Taekwondo Championships in October 2012. At the World Championships in Uzbekistan, the athlete won the first world gold medal for Vietnamese Taekwondo and a silver medal in the team poomsae event at the World Championships in Colombia.

=== 2013 ===
The following year, at the World Taekwondo Poomsae Championships, she and her teammates won two gold medals in the team poomsae and creative poomsae events at the World Championships in Indonesia. Kim, Nguyễn Thị Thu Ngân, and Châu Tuyết Vân became the three female martial artists to win Vietnam's first gold medal at the 2013 Southeast Asian Games on 18 December in the Taekwondo competition.

=== 2014 ===
In 2014, Kim won a gold medal in the women's standard team poomsae event alongside Châu Tuyết Vân and Nguyễn Thùy Xuân Linh at the World Taekwondo Poomsae Championships. She subsequently competed at the Southeast Asian Junior and Senior Championships, winning two gold medals in the women's U30 team poomsae and five-person creative poomsae events.

=== 2015 ===
At the 2015 Southeast Asian Games in Singapore, the trio of martial artists Châu Tuyết Vân, Kim, and Nguyễn Thùy Xuân Linh won the gold medal in the women's team poomsae event for Vietnam.

=== 2016 ===
At the 2016 World Taekwondo Poomsae Championships, on the first day of competition, Vietnam won a silver medal in the women's under-30 standard team poomsae event through Châu Tuyết Vân, Kim, and Liên Thị Tuyết Mai. On the second day of competition, Vietnam won two more silver medals and one bronze medal. In the freestyle team event for athletes over 17, Châu Tuyết Vân, Kim, Hứa Văn Huy, Nguyễn Thiên Phụng, and Lê Thanh Trung won the silver medal.

=== 2017 ===
In August and September 2017, the Vietnam national Taekwondo poomsae team competed in three consecutive tournaments and achieved notable results in all of them. Kim, together with Châu Tuyết Vân and Liên Thị Tuyết Mai, won three gold medals in the women's team poomsae event at the 2017 Southeast Asian Games and the Asian Indoor and Martial Arts Games.

=== 2018 ===
The following year, Vietnam's first gold medal came in the women's under-30 team poomsae event. The three athletes Ngô Thị Thuỳ Dung, Liên Thị Tuyết Mai, and Kim put in a strong performance to earn a score of 8.210.

=== 2019 ===
At the 2019 Southeast Asian Games, Châu Tuyết Vân, Liên Thị Tuyết Mai, and Kim successfully defended their gold medal in the women's team poomsae event.

=== 2020 ===
In 2020, Kim and her teammates won one gold medal in the women's team event and one bronze medal in the five-person freestyle poomsae event at the 2020 Vietnam National Taekwondo Championships.

=== 2021 ===
At the 2021 National Taekwondo Club Championships, Kim won a gold medal.

=== 2024 ===
On 15 May 2024, Châu Tuyết Vân, Liên Thị Tuyết Mai, and Kim won the gold medal in the women's over-30 team standard poomsae event at the 2024 Asian Taekwondo Championships.

== Selected achievements ==
Year	Competition	Location	Achievement	Source
2010	World Taekwondo Poomsae Championships	Tashkent	Gold medal	
2010	National Sports Festival	Vietnam	Silver medal	
2011	2011 Southeast Asian Games	Indonesia	Silver medal	
2011	6th World Taekwondo Poomsae Championships	Russia	Silver medal	
2011	6th World Taekwondo Poomsae Championships	Russia	Bronze medal	
2012	World Taekwondo Poomsae Championships	Uzbekistan	Gold medal	
2012	Asian University Taekwondo Championships	Malaysia	Gold medal	
2012	World Military Taekwondo Championships	Vietnam	Gold medal	
2012	World Taekwondo Poomsae Championships	Colombia	Silver medal	
2013	World Taekwondo Poomsae Championships	Indonesia	Gold medal	
2013	2013 Southeast Asian Games	Myanmar	Gold medal	
2014	World Taekwondo Poomsae Championships	Vietnam	Gold medal	
2015	2015 Southeast Asian Games	Singapore	Gold medal	
2015	Southeast Asian Taekwondo Championships	Vietnam	Gold medal	
2015	2015 National Youth Taekwondo Championships	Vietnam	Gold medal	
2016	Asian Championships	Vietnam	Gold medal	
2016	Asian Championships	Vietnam	Bronze medal	
2017	2017 Southeast Asian Games	Malaysia	Gold medal	
2017	Asian Indoor and Martial Arts Games	Japan	Gold medal	
2017	2017 Summer Universiade	China	Gold medal	
2018	Asian Taekwondo Championships	Vietnam	Gold medal	
2019	2019 Southeast Asian Games	Philippines	Gold medal	
2021	National Taekwondo Club Championships	Vietnam	Gold medal	
2024	Asian Taekwondo Championships	Vietnam	Gold medal	

== Achievements ==
- Four Prime Minister's Certificates of Merit, awarded in 2011, 2012, 2013, and 2015.
- One Labor Order (Vietnam), awarded in 2018.
- One Advanced Youth Following President Ho Chi Minh's Teachings Medal in 2020.
- Labor Order (Vietnam) (2025).

== Family ==
She has a younger sister named Nguyễn Thị Kim Hà, born in 2000, who holds a fourth-degree black belt. She has won two gold medals at the Southeast Asian Championships, one silver medal and one bronze medal at the World Taekwondo Junior Championships, one gold medal and one bronze medal at the World Beach Taekwondo Championships, and two gold medals at the French Open Taekwondo International Championships.
