= 2025 World Taekwondo Championships – Men's lightweight =

Taekwondo competitions

Men's lightweight at the 2025 World Championships
- Venue: Taihu International Expo Center
- Dates: 30 October 2025
- Competitors: 68 from 64 nations

Medalists
gold medal	Najmiddin Kosimkhojiev	Uzbekistan
silver medal	Edival Pontes	Brazil
bronze medal	Amir Sina Bakhtiari	Iran
bronze medal	Magomed Abdusalamov	Individual Neutral Athletes

The men's lightweight competition at the 2025 World Taekwondo Championships was held on 30 October 2025 in Wuxi, China. Lightweights were limited to a maximum of 74 kilograms (163 lb) in body mass.

== Results ==
Legend

- P — Won by punitive declaration
- W — Won by withdrawal

=== Finals ===
Quarterfinals
Yergesh Bekassyl (KAZ)	3	1
Amir Sina Bakhtiari (IRI)	3	13
Edival Pontes (BRA)	6	4
Cai Zhaoxun (CHN)	1	3
Najmiddin Kosimkhojiev (UZB)	7	11
Otto Jørgensen (DEN)	4	1
Magomed Abdusalamov (AIN)	4	7
Victor Rodrigues (USA)	1	4

Semifinals
Amir Sina Bakhtiari (IRI)	3	2
Edival Pontes (BRA)	3	12
Najmiddin Kosimkhojiev (UZB)	4	7	5
Magomed Abdusalamov (AIN)	4	8	4

Final
Edival Pontes (BRA)	2	3
Najmiddin Kosimkhojiev (UZB)	4	5

=== Top half ===
==== Section 1 ====
Round of 128
Bizhan Sadr Zada (AFG)	3	0
Bernardo Pié (DOM)	13	4

Round of 64
Zurab Kintsurashvili (GEO)	6	6	0
Bernardo Pié (DOM)	2	8	3
Lucian Procopciuc (POR)	2	1
Yergesh Bekassyl (KAZ)	6	13
Charalampos Flouskounis (GRE)	0	3	8
Arya Danu Susilo (INA)	5	1	7
Stefano Crescentini (SMR)	2	0
Ömer Furkan Körpe (TUR)	14	9

Round of 32
Bernardo Pié (DOM)	4	4	3
Yergesh Bekassyl (KAZ)	7	1	3
Charalampos Flouskounis (GRE)	7	1	4
Ömer Furkan Körpe (TUR)	4	2	4

Round of 16
Yergesh Bekassyl (KAZ)	4	13	7
Ömer Furkan Körpe (TUR)	6	0	1

==== Section 2 ====
Round of 128

Round of 64
Daniel Quesada (ESP)	12	14
Nikolas Nikolaou (CYP)	2	2
Erfan Moradi (TRT)	0	7	4
Angelo Mangione (ITA)	11	5	8
Łukasz Cudnoch (POL)	0	0
Javad Aghayev (AZE)	1	4
Krittayot Phrompatju (THA)	9	5	9
Amir Sina Bakhtiari (IRI)	1	15	9

Round of 32
Daniel Quesada (ESP)	6	3	2
Angelo Mangione (ITA)	0	4	5
Javad Aghayev (AZE)	4	0
Amir Sina Bakhtiari (IRI)	5	0

Round of 16
Angelo Mangione (ITA)	3	6	4
Amir Sina Bakhtiari (IRI)	3	5	4

==== Section 3 ====
Round of 128

Round of 64
Edival Pontes (BRA)	12	14
Max Watene (COK)	0	1
Zaid Kareem (JOR)	5	8	6
Mohamed Fofana (MLI)	9	7	1
Andrii Chumachenko (UKR)	1	22	4
Kang Jae-gwon (KOR)	13	11	17
Høgni Kunoy Dávason (FRO)	1	0
Marko Golubić (CRO)	6	5

Round of 32
Edival Pontes (BRA)	10	4
Zaid Kareem (JOR)	3	3
Kang Jae-gwon (KOR)	3	13
Marko Golubić (CRO)	10	18

Round of 16
Edival Pontes (BRA)	4	4	5
Marko Golubić (CRO)	8	4	5

==== Section 4 ====
Round of 128
Izaac Saeed Kodi (SSD)	7	5	0
Nathaniel Brown (ZIM)	7	17	1

Round of 64
Benjamin Husić (BIH)	0	9	9
Aashis Bhandari (NEP)	4	8	5
Luis Rommel (PER)	1	2
Amar Cissé (GAB)	9	11
Federico González (URU)	0	0
Taye Ragheb (AUS)	0	1^{W}
Nathaniel Brown (ZIM)	0	0
Cai Zhaoxun (CHN)	11	3

Round of 32
Benjamin Husić (BIH)	2	3	5
Amar Cissé (GAB)	4	3	4
Taye Ragheb (AUS)	0	1
Cai Zhaoxun (CHN)	12	9

Round of 16
Benjamin Husić (BIH)	1	6
Cai Zhaoxun (CHN)	11	10

=== Bottom half ===
==== Section 5 ====
Round of 128
Othman Bouajaj (MAR)	2	9	0
Abdoul Malik Salifou (NIG)	7	7	7^{P}

Round of 64
Stefan Takov (SRB)	13	13
Abdoul Malik Salifou (NIG)	7	1
Rami Eissa (EGY)	3	4
Dave Cea (PHI)	1	3
Ayoub Bouriel (CAN)	1	5	6
Tareg Hamedi (KSA)	14	3	3
Yao Abongni (CIV)	4	7
Najmiddin Kosimkhojiev (UZB)	8	8

Round of 32
Stefan Takov (SRB)	4	7
Rami Eissa (EGY)	5	9
Ayoub Bouriel (CAN)	5	3
Najmiddin Kosimkhojiev (UZB)	15	12

Round of 16
Rami Eissa (EGY)	2	7	6
Najmiddin Kosimkhojiev (UZB)	3	5	14

==== Section 6 ====
Round of 128

Round of 64
Tomáš Sittek (CZE)	9	12
Tam Ching Nam (HKG)	4	0
Juan Soto (WT)	4	12
Ryan Doyle (IRL)	0	0
Aleksandr Muskevitš (EST)	W
Levente Józsa (HUN)
Fred Valentina (SOL)	1	3
Otto Jørgensen (DEN)	13	14

Round of 32
Tomáš Sittek (CZE)	0	5	5
Juan Soto (WT)	0	10	2
Aleksandr Muskevitš (EST)	9	1
Otto Jørgensen (DEN)	14	15

Round of 16
Tomáš Sittek (CZE)	1	9
Otto Jørgensen (DEN)	5	17

==== Section 7 ====
Round of 128

Round of 64
Magomed Abdusalamov (AIN)	11	7
Samaki Pinas (SUR)	0	2
Artsiom Babakhin (AIN)	8	7
Mal Sahiti (KOS)	3	3
Rahiti Iorss (FPO)	8	6
Ibrahim Mamoudou (TOG)	13	8
Damián Gil (COL)	3	1
Hsieh Tsung-yu (TPE)	4	5

Round of 32
Magomed Abdusalamov (AIN)	5	5
Artsiom Babakhin (AIN)	3	0
Ibrahim Mamoudou (TOG)	7	5
Hsieh Tsung-yu (TPE)	1	2

Round of 16
Magomed Abdusalamov (AIN)	6	10
Ibrahim Mamoudou (TOG)	2	0

==== Section 8 ====
Round of 128
Ashish Muwal (IND)	10	5	3
Ahmad Farhat (LBN)	2	5	3

Round of 64
Takato Kato (JPN)	8	5
Sean Laloan (HAI)	1	0
Cheikhouna Seck (SEN)	3	2
Rubén Nava (MEX)	12	12
Linus Vesterlund (SWE)	2	5	0
Andes Cammaerts (BEL)	8	4	7
Ahmad Farhat (LBN)	1	0
Victor Rodrigues (USA)	13	12

Round of 32
Takato Kato (JPN)	4	1
Rubén Nava (MEX)	7	9
Andes Cammaerts (BEL)	0	0
Victor Rodrigues (USA)	6	11^{P}

Round of 16
Rubén Nava (MEX)	7	1	3
Victor Rodrigues (USA)	2	6	9
