= Ngô Thị Thuỳ Dung =

Vietnamese athlete (born 1995)

Personal information
- Nationality: Vietnam
- Born: Ngô Thị Thuỳ Dung; 15 February 1995 (age 31) Ho Chi Minh City, Vietnam
- Occupation: Athletes Taekwondo

Sport
- Sport: Taekwondo

Medal record

Professional Taekwondo athlete

Representing Vietnam

SEA Games
| Gold medal – first place | 2019 Philippines | Women's team poomsae |
| Gold medal – first place | 2022 Vietnam | Women's team poomsae |

Ngô Thị Thuỳ Dung (born 15 February 1995) is a Vietnamese Taekwondo athlete. She is a member of the Vietnam national Taekwondo team.

== Biography ==
Dung began practicing Taekwondo at the age of eight. In 2010, Dung was sent to train with the Vietnam national Taekwondo poomsae team while also attending school in Ho Chi Minh City. After more than a year of intensive training, Dung officially became a member of the national Taekwondo poomsae team.

== Career ==
=== 2011 ===
In 2011, she won one gold medal and one silver medal at the Southeast Asian Junior Taekwondo Championships, as well as one silver medal at the World Junior Taekwondo Championships.

=== 2012 ===
In 2012, she won two bronze medals at the Asian Junior Taekwondo Championships, one gold medal at the Vietnam National Taekwondo Championships, and two gold medals at the National Phù Đổng Health Association.

=== 2013 ===
In 2013, she won one gold medal at the Southeast Asian Taekwondo Championships, one bronze medal at the World Taekwondo Championships, and one gold medal at the Vietnam National Taekwondo Championships.

=== 2014 ===
In 2014, she won one gold medal at the Asian Taekwondo Championships, one gold medal at the World Taekwondo Championships, one gold medal at the Vietnam National Taekwondo Championships, and one gold medal and one bronze medal at the National Sports Festival.

=== 2015 ===
In 2015, she won one gold medal at the 7th National Sports Festival, two gold medals at the 12th Southeast Asian Taekwondo Championships, and one gold medal at the Vietnam National Taekwondo Championships.

=== 2016 ===
In 2016, she won one gold medal at the Asian Taekwondo Championships and one gold medal at the Vietnam National Taekwondo Championships.

=== 2017 ===
In 2017, she won one gold medal at the Southeast Asian Taekwondo Championships, a bronze medal at the 2017 Summer Universiade, and one gold medal at the Vietnam National Taekwondo Championships.

=== 2019 ===
The three athletes Dung, Liên Thị Tuyết Mai, and Nguyễn Thị Lệ Kim delivered a strong performance to earn a score of 8.210 at the 2019 Southeast Asian Games.

=== 2020 ===
In 2020, she won one gold medal and one silver medal at the national championships; one gold medal and one silver medal at the National Club Cup Championships; and subsequently one gold medal, one silver medal, and one bronze medal at the Mekong Delta Championships.

=== 2022 ===
The trio of athletes Nguyễn Thị Kim Hà, Dung, and Nguyễn Thị Hồng Trang competed in the final of the women's team standard poomsae event at the SEA Games 31. The host nation athletes defeated opponents from Thailand, Malaysia, and Laos to win the gold medal.

== Selected achievements ==
| Year | Competition | Location | Result | Source |
|---|---|---|---|---|
| 2011 | Southeast Asian Junior Taekwondo Championships | | Gold medal | |
| 2011 | Southeast Asian Junior Taekwondo Championships | | Silver medal | |
| 2011 | World Junior Taekwondo Championships | | Silver medal | |
| 2012 | Asian Junior Taekwondo Championships | | 2 bronze medals | |
| 2012 | Vietnam National Taekwondo Championships | Vietnam | Gold medal | |
| 2012 | National Phù Đổng Health Association | Vietnam | 2 gold medals | |
| 2013 | Southeast Asian Taekwondo Championships | | Gold medal | |
| 2013 | World Taekwondo Championships | | Bronze medal | |
| 2013 | Vietnam National Taekwondo Championships | Vietnam | Gold medal | |
| 2014 | Asian Taekwondo Championships | | Gold medal | |
| 2014 | World Taekwondo Championships | | Gold medal | |
| 2014 | Vietnam National Taekwondo Championships | Vietnam | Gold medal | |
| 2014 | National Sports Festival | Vietnam | Bronze medal | |
| 2015 | 7th National Sports Festival | Vietnam | Gold medal | |
| 2015 | 12th Southeast Asian Taekwondo Championships | | 2 gold medals | |
| 2015 | Vietnam National Taekwondo Championships | Vietnam | Gold medal | |
| 2016 | Asian Taekwondo Championships | | Gold medal | |
| 2016 | Vietnam National Taekwondo Championships | Vietnam | Gold medal | |
| 2017 | Southeast Asian Taekwondo Championships | | Gold medal | |
| 2017 | Summer Universiade | | Gold medal | |
| 2017 | Vietnam National Taekwondo Championships | Vietnam | Gold medal | |
| 2019 | 2019 Southeast Asian Games | Philippines | Gold medal | |
| 2020 | Vietnam National Taekwondo Championships | Vietnam | Gold medal | |
| 2020 | Vietnam National Taekwondo Championships | Vietnam | Silver medal | |
| 2020 | National Club Cup Championships | Vietnam | Gold medal | |
| 2020 | National Club Cup Championships | Vietnam | Silver medal | |
| 2020 | Mekong Delta Championships | Vietnam | Gold medal | |
| 2020 | Mekong Delta Championships | Vietnam | Silver medal | |
| 2020 | Mekong Delta Championships | Vietnam | Bronze medal | |
| 2022 | 2021 Southeast Asian Games | Vietnam | Gold medal | |
