= Taekwondo at the 2022 Asian Games – Men's individual poomsae =

Taekwondo competition

Men's individual poomsae at the 2022 Asian Games
- Venue: Lin'an Sports and Culture Centre
- Date: 24 September 2023
- Competitors: 15 from 15 nations

Medalists
| gold medal | Kang Wan-jin | South Korea |
| silver medal | Ma Yun-zhong | Chinese Taipei |
| bronze medal | Trần Hồ Duy | Vietnam |
| bronze medal | Patrick King Perez | Philippines |

The men's individual poomsae event at the 2022 Asian Games took place on 24 September 2023 at Lin'an Sports and Culture Centre, Hangzhou, China.

Like kyorugi events, the competition was a straight single-elimination tournament. Both semifinal losers were awarded bronze medals. From the preliminary round to the quarterfinals, practitioners performed recognized poomsae routines. From the semifinals and onward, they performed a recognized routine for the first program and then did a freestyle routine for the second program. There were seven judges on the panel, and the average score of the five judges, excluding the highest and the lowest points, was the final score.

== Schedule ==
All times are China Standard Time (UTC+08:00)

| Date | Time | Event |
|---|---|---|
| Sunday, 24 September 2023 | 09:00 | Round of 16 |
| Sunday, 24 September 2023 | 09:00 | Quarterfinals |
| Sunday, 24 September 2023 | 14:00 | Semifinals |
| Sunday, 24 September 2023 | 14:00 | Gold medal contest |

== Results ==
Round of 16
Nuttapat Kaewkan (THA) | 7.67
Darren Yap (SGP) | 7.62
Wahid Moghis (KSA) | 7.40
Nooruddin Husain (BAN) | 6.46
Trần Hồ Duy (VIE) | 7.78
Chan Chung Yin (HKG) | 7.65
Patrick King Perez (PHI) | 7.70
Souksavanh Chanthilath (LAO) | 7.44
Aqdus Ullah Qadeer (PAK) | 7.25
Prem Bahadur Limbu (NEP) | 7.36
Jason Loo (MAS) | 7.91
Tong Hou Pan (MAC) | 7.51
Morteza Zendehdel (IRI) | 7.91
Ma Yun-zhong (TPE) | 7.92

Quarterfinals
Kang Wan-jin (KOR) | 7.81
Nuttapat Kaewkan (THA) | 7.54
Wahid Moghis (KSA) | 7.23
Trần Hồ Duy (VIE) | 7.49
Patrick King Perez (PHI) | 7.56
Prem Bahadur Limbu (NEP) | 7.16
Jason Loo (MAS) | 7.77
Ma Yun-zhong (TPE) | 7.95

Semifinals
Kang Wan-jin (KOR) | 7.41
Trần Hồ Duy (VIE) | 7.12
Patrick King Perez (PHI) | 6.91
Ma Yun-zhong (TPE) | 7.45

Gold medal contest
Kang Wan-jin (KOR) | 7.73
Ma Yun-zhong (TPE) | 7.48
