= Taekwondo at the 2021 Summer World University Games =

Taekwondo competition

- Venue: Sichuan Normal University
- Location: Qingyang District, China
- Dates: 29 July–4 August

Taekwondo competitions at the 2021 Summer World University Games will be held between 29 July and 4 August 2023 at the Sichuan Normal University Gymnasium in Qingyang District, Chengdu, Sichuan, China.

== Medal table ==
Rank	Nation	Gold	Silver	Bronze	Total
1	China*	7	5	7	19
2	South Korea	7	1	5	13
3	Iran	4	3	6	13
4	Turkey	2	3	4	9
5	Thailand	2	0	2	4
6	Kazakhstan	1	0	1	2
7	Chinese Taipei	0	6	4	10
8	Uzbekistan	0	5	2	7
9	Vietnam	0	0	3	3
10	France	0	0	2	2
10	Germany	0	0	2	2
10	Poland	0	0	2	2
13	Azerbaijan	0	0	1	1
13	Belgium	0	0	1	1
13	Croatia	0	0	1	1
13	Spain	0	0	1	1
13	Ukraine	0	0	1	1
13	United States	0	0	1	1
Totals (18 entries)		23	23	46	92

Source: Medal&Rank

== Medal summary ==
=== Men ===
Event	Gold	Silver	Bronze
–54 kg (finweight)	Mehdi Haji Mousaei; Iran	Omonjon Otajonov; Uzbekistan	Nam Yong-hyuk; South Korea
–54 kg (finweight)	Mehdi Haji Mousaei; Iran	Omonjon Otajonov; Uzbekistan	Sirawit Mahamad; Thailand
–58 kg (flyweight)	Alireza Hosseinpour; Iran	Amirbek Turaev; Uzbekistan	Bilal Küskü; Turkey
–58 kg (flyweight)	Alireza Hosseinpour; Iran	Amirbek Turaev; Uzbekistan	Park Chan; South Korea
–63 kg (bantamweight)	Hakan Reçber; Turkey	Liang Yushuai; China	Hsu Hao-yu; Chinese Taipei
–63 kg (bantamweight)	Hakan Reçber; Turkey	Liang Yushuai; China	Napat Sritimongkol; Thailand
–68 kg (featherweight)	Lee Sang-ryeol; South Korea	Chiu Yi-jui; Chinese Taipei	Xiao Chenming; China
–68 kg (featherweight)	Lee Sang-ryeol; South Korea	Chiu Yi-jui; Chinese Taipei	Ferhat Can Kavurat; Turkey
–74 kg (lightweight)	Mirhashem Hosseini; Iran	Cui Yang; China	Athman Bouthouyak; France
–74 kg (lightweight)	Mirhashem Hosseini; Iran	Cui Yang; China	Najmiddin Kosimkhojiev; Uzbekistan
–80 kg (welterweight)	Zhang Kai; China	Shukhrat Salaev; Uzbekistan	Mehran Barkhordari; Iran
–80 kg (welterweight)	Zhang Kai; China	Shukhrat Salaev; Uzbekistan	Seo Geon-woo; South Korea
–87 kg (middleweight)	Meng Mingkuan; China	Arian Salimi; Iran	Lee Kyeong-hak; South Korea
–87 kg (middleweight)	Meng Mingkuan; China	Arian Salimi; Iran	Josip Bilić Pavlinović; Croatia
+87 kg (heavyweight)	Emre Kutalmış Ateşli; Turkey	Jung Jiun-jie; Chinese Taipei	Liu Guicheng; China
+87 kg (heavyweight)	Emre Kutalmış Ateşli; Turkey	Jung Jiun-jie; Chinese Taipei	Andrii Harbar; Ukraine
Individual Poomsae	Kang Wan-jin; South Korea	Hu Mingda; China	Muhammed Emir Yılmaz; Turkey
Individual Poomsae	Kang Wan-jin; South Korea	Hu Mingda; China	Morteza Zendehdel; Iran
Team Poomsae	South Korea; Shin Woo-seop; Lee Jae-won; Gwon Min-seok	China; Hu Mingda; Yang Lei; Liu Siyue	Vietnam; Lưu Quyền Phước; Bùi Anh Tuấ; Nguyễn Ngọc Minh Hy
Team Poomsae	South Korea; Shin Woo-seop; Lee Jae-won; Gwon Min-seok	China; Hu Mingda; Yang Lei; Liu Siyue	Iran; Reza Jalalifar; Ali Mousania; Morteza Zendehdel
Team Kyorugi	South Korea; Seo Geon-woo; Lee Sang-ryeol; Ryoo Jin; Lee Kyeong-hak	Iran; Alireza Hosseinpour; Mirhashem Hosseini; Mehran Barkhordari; Arian Salimi	Kazakhstan; Abdurakhmon Maripov; Beibarys Kablan; Bexultan Mussakhan; Shamsat Duisenov
Team Kyorugi	South Korea; Seo Geon-woo; Lee Sang-ryeol; Ryoo Jin; Lee Kyeong-hak	Iran; Alireza Hosseinpour; Mirhashem Hosseini; Mehran Barkhordari; Arian Salimi	China; Cui Yang; Liang Yushuai; Meng Mingkuan; Xiao Chenming

=== Women's events ===
Event	Gold	Silver	Bronze
–46 kg (finweight)	Rita Bakisheva; Kazakhstan	Huang Ying-hsuan; Chinese Taipei	Xie Xueting; China
–46 kg (finweight)	Rita Bakisheva; Kazakhstan	Huang Ying-hsuan; Chinese Taipei	Minaya Akbarova; Azerbaijan
–49 kg (flyweight)	Panipak Wongpattanakit; Thailand	Merve Dinçel; Turkey	Miaoyi Lua; China
–49 kg (flyweight)	Panipak Wongpattanakit; Thailand	Merve Dinçel; Turkey	Supharada Kisskalt; Germany
–53 kg (bantamweight)	Nahid Kiani; Iran	Su Po-ya; Chinese Taipei	Guo Qing; China
–53 kg (bantamweight)	Nahid Kiani; Iran	Su Po-ya; Chinese Taipei	Alma Pérez; Spain
–57 kg (featherweight)	Kim Yu-jin; South Korea	Lo Chia-ling; Chinese Taipei	Yang Junli; China
–57 kg (featherweight)	Kim Yu-jin; South Korea	Lo Chia-ling; Chinese Taipei	Patrycja Adamkiewicz; Poland
–62 kg (lightweight)	Sasikarn Tongchan; Thailand	Feruza Sadikova; Uzbekistan	Narges Mirnourollahi; Iran
–62 kg (lightweight)	Sasikarn Tongchan; Thailand	Feruza Sadikova; Uzbekistan	Chiu Shao-hsuan; Chinese Taipei
–67 kg (welterweight)	Song Jie; China	İkra Kayır; Turkey	Sarah Chaâri; Belgium
–67 kg (welterweight)	Song Jie; China	İkra Kayır; Turkey	Khalida Haddad; France
–73 kg (middleweight)	Zhou Zeqi; China	Mervenur Erdem; Turkey	Alema Hadzic; Germany
–73 kg (middleweight)	Zhou Zeqi; China	Mervenur Erdem; Turkey	Svetlana Osipova; Uzbekistan
+73 kg (heavyweight)	Xu Lei; China	Anahita Tavakkoli; Iran	Ma Ting-hsia; Chinese Taipei
+73 kg (heavyweight)	Xu Lei; China	Anahita Tavakkoli; Iran	Esra Akbulak; Turkey
Individual Poomsae	Cha Yea-eun; South Korea	Hu Tzu-hsuan; Chinese Taipei	Yasaman Limouchi; Iran
Individual Poomsae	Cha Yea-eun; South Korea	Hu Tzu-hsuan; Chinese Taipei	Nguyễn Phan Khánh Hân; Vietnam
Team Poomsae	South Korea; Jung Ha-eun; Yun Ji-hye; Song Kyeong-seon	China; Liu Yuqing; Liang Jie; Li Wan	Vietnam; Lê Trần Kim Uyên; Nguyễn Thị Kim Hà; Nguyễn Phan Khánh Hân
Team Poomsae	South Korea; Jung Ha-eun; Yun Ji-hye; Song Kyeong-seon	China; Liu Yuqing; Liang Jie; Li Wan	Iran; Yasaman Limouchi; Reihaneh Omrani; Mobina Sharifi
Team Kyorugi	China; Liu Junhong; Song Jie; Yang Junli; Zhou Zeqi	Uzbekistan; Madinabonu Mannopova; Feruza Sadikova; Ozoda Sobirjonova; Madina Mirabzalova	Poland; Łucja Oleszczuk; Julia Sereda; Patrycja Adamkiewicz; Aleksandra Kowalczuk
Team Kyorugi	China; Liu Junhong; Song Jie; Yang Junli; Zhou Zeqi	Uzbekistan; Madinabonu Mannopova; Feruza Sadikova; Ozoda Sobirjonova; Madina Mirabzalova	South Korea; Jang Eun-ji; Kim Yu-jin; Jo Hee-kyeong; Lim Geum-byeol

=== Mixed events ===
Event	Gold	Silver	Bronze
Team Poomsae	China; Liang Jie; Liu Siyue	South Korea; Kim Gyeong-gyu; Son Min-seon	Chinese Taipei; Hsu Yu-tse; Huang Pin-chieh
Team Poomsae	China; Liang Jie; Liu Siyue	South Korea; Kim Gyeong-gyu; Son Min-seon	United States; Alex Lee; Adalis Muñoz
