= 2024 European Taekwondo Championships – Men's 74 kg =

Men's 74 kg at the 2024 European Taekwondo Championships
- Venue: Belgrade Fair – Hall 1
- Location: Belgrade, Serbia
- Dates: 12 May
- Competitors: 28 from 28 nations

Medalists
gold medal	Daniel Quesada	Spain
silver medal	Zurab Kintsurashvili	Georgia
bronze medal	Javad Aghayev	Azerbaijan
bronze medal	Charalampos Flouskounis	Greece

The men's 74 kg competition at the 2024 European Taekwondo Championships was held on 12 May 2024.

== Results ==
=== Finals ===
Semifinals
Daniel Quesada (ESP)	2
Javad Aghayev (AZE)	0
Zurab Kintsurashvili (GEO)	2
Charalampos Flouskounis (GRE)	0

Final
Daniel Quesada (ESP)	2
Zurab Kintsurashvili (GEO)	1

=== Top half ===
==== Section 1 ====
Round of 32
Andrii Chumachenko (UKR)	2
Stefano Crescentini (SMR)	0
Yiğithan Kılıç (TUR)	2
Dantrell Knight-Mitchell (GBR)	1
Linus Vesterlund (SWE)	0
Kadyrbech Daurov (AIN)	2

Round of 16
Daniel Quesada (ESP)	2
Andrii Chumachenko (UKR)	1
Yiğithan Kılıç (TUR)	0
Kadyrbech Daurov (AIN)	2

Quarterfinals
Daniel Quesada (ESP)	2
Kadyrbech Daurov (AIN)	1

==== Section 2 ====
Round of 32
Sebastian Thune (NOR)	2
Ștefan Agrișan (ROU)	0
Nimrod Krivishkiy (ISR)	0
Javad Aghayev (AZE)	2
Evangelos Charalambous (CYP)	1
Angelo Mangione (ITA)	2

Round of 16
Sebastian Thune (NOR)	0
Javad Aghayev (AZE)	2
Angelo Mangione (ITA)
Strahinja Milinković (SRB)	DQB

Quarterfinals
Javad Aghayev (AZE)	2
Strahinja Milinković (SRB)	0

=== Bottom half ===
==== Section 3 ====
Round of 32
Leon Hrgota (CRO)	2
Dmitrii Suleac (MDA)	1
Vasilije Peruničić (MNE)	2
Tomáš Neshyba (CZE)	0
Mitko Dzhordzhev (BUL)	1
Leroy Nsilu Dilandu (IRL)	2

Round of 16
Zurab Kintsurashvili (GEO)	2
Leon Hrgota (CRO)	0
Vasilije Peruničić (MNE)	0
Leroy Nsilu Dilandu (IRL)	2

Quarterfinals
Zurab Kintsurashvili (GEO)	2
Leroy Nsilu Dilandu (IRL)	0

==== Section 4 ====
Round of 32
Lyve-Stone Célin (FRA)	2
Benjamin Husić (BIH)	0
Abdullah Sediqi (RTA)	0
Omer Dawoud (DEN)	2
Charalampos Flouskounis (GRE)	2
Lucian Procopciuc (POR)	0

Round of 16
Lyve-Stone Célin (FRA)	2
Omer Dawoud (DEN)	1
Charalampos Flouskounis (GRE)	2
Lin Kovačič (SLO)	0

Quarterfinals
Lyve-Stone Célin (FRA)	0
Charalampos Flouskounis (GRE)	2
