= Javad Aghayev =

Azerbaijani taekwondo practitioner

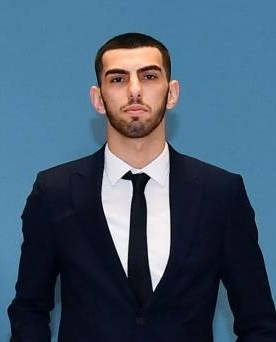

Personal information
- Nationality: Azerbaijani
- Born: 15 January 2002 (age 24)

Sport
- Sport: Taekwondo
- Event: 74 kg
Medal record
Men's Taekwondo
Representing Azerbaijan
World Championships
Bronze medal – third place	2022 Guadalajara	68 kg
European Championships
Bronze medal – third place	2024 Belgrade	74 kg
Bronze medal – third place	2026 Munich	74 kg
World Junior Championships
Gold medal – first place	2018 Hammamet	63 kg

Javad Aghayev (born 15 January 2002) is an Azerbaijani taekwondo practitioner. He became a world junior champion in 2018, and won bronze medals at the 2022 World Taekwondo Championships and 2024 and 2026 European Championships.

== Career ==
From Qabala, he was a bronze medalist at the European Youth Cup in Larnaca, Cyprus in 2017 in the 63 kg division. He was a gold medalist in the -63kg division at the European Clubs Championships in Istanbul, Turkey in 2018. He was also a gold medalist in that division at the 2018 World Taekwondo Junior Championships in Hammamet, Tunisia.

After moving to the senior ranks, he won titles at the Dutch Open and Belgian Open before competing at the 2019 World Taekwondo Championships in Manchester, England. He won silver at the 2022 European Under-21 Championships in Tirana and a bronze at the 2022 World Taekwondo Championships in Guadalajara, Mexico, in the men’s featherweight division, defeating Uzbekistan's Tokyo 2020 champion Ulugbek Rashitov on his way to the semi-finals.

He was a bronze medalist at the 2024 European Taekwondo Championships in the men's 74 kg division in Belgrade in May 2024.

He was selected to compete at the 2025 World Taekwondo Championships in Wuxi, China, in October 2025, in the men's lightweight division.

In May 2026, at the European Championship in Munich, Javad Agayev won a bronze medal in the weight category up to 74 kg.
