= Nguyễn Trần Diệu Thúy =

Vietnamese pilot, former actress (1989– )

- Born: December 9, 1989 (age 36); Quảng Trị, Vietnam
- Other name: Tyra Dieu Thuy
- Citizenship: Ho Chi Minh City
- Education: Tôn Đức Thắng University
- Occupations: Airline pilot, photo model, actress
- Years active: Model / actress: 2009–2014; Airline pilot: 2018–present
- Known for: Quitting acting career to become a pilot
- Height: 164 cm (5 ft 4 1/2 in)
- Awards: Miss Ao Dai – Miss Cherry Blossoom 2009; Miss Sunplay 2011

Nguyen Tran Dieu Thuy (born December 9, 1989), also called Tyra Dieu Thuy, is a Vietnamese airline pilot and former model and actress. She is a first officer for Bamboo Airways, where she was their first female pilot, remaining their only female pilot until 2020.

== Biography ==
Nguyen Tran Dieu Thuy was born on 9 December 1989, in Quang Tri. She graduated from Ton Duc Thang University, majoring in the field of environment and labour engineering. In 2008, she entered Vietnamese showbiz in a contest name Hot Vteen and became well known as the most excellent candidate in ballet dancing without professional training. Due to the impression she made during the contest, she was then invited to the movie Beauty Every Centimeter by director Vu Ngoc Dang. During this time, she also took part in and was awarded with a few prizes in some small beauty contests, hence being a photo model for many teen magazines.

=== Acting career ===
The first drama of Dieu Thuy was A Foggy Slope (Vietnamese: Dốc sương mù). She joined as the main female lead named H'Mây. This drama was about romantic love, about human love in Central Highlands, broadcast on QTV, HTV and VTV9. After being broadcast, Dieu Thuy received much attention thanks to the image of an amicable ethnic girl with pure beauty. This drama starred Dieu Thuy and a model named Duc Tien, which has been a milestone in her acting career. Later, Dieu Thuy is often called "female character of A Foggy Slope".

After being "Miss Sunplay", Dieu Thuy made a strong impression with the role of "Le" in the drama The Legend of 1C (Vietnamese: Huyền thoại 1C) – which relived the life and the extremely harsh battle of the youth volunteers in the South-West battlefield of Vietnam War during the 1960s. This drama was on air on HTV9 channel in 2012 and VTV1 in 2013. Dieu Thuy became more popular due to her striking beauty and her character in the movie.

In 2012, thanks to the success of the movie A Foggy Slope, Dieu Thuy was invited by director Hoang Trung to play the movie The Storms of Life (Vietnamese: Những mảnh đời giông bão) as An Lanh – an orphan energetic girl and then became a police officer with the ability to read the suspect's mind. The series aired on HTV9 is the first film by a private studio to be aired during the main film time slot by TFS. After that, she continuously acted in many other films such as The Maid (Vietnamese: Người giúp việc), Black Coin (Vietnamese: Đồng tiền đen), On the Other Riverbank (Vietnamese: Bên kia sông). The movies she participated in all had the participation of many famous artists, especially the film On the Other Riverbank. This drama has the participation of many merited artists such as Viet Anh, Ta Minh Tam, Tuyet Thu, My Uyen, Hanh Thuy.

=== Becoming a pilot ===
After finishing the drama Black Money (Vietnamese: Đồng tiền đen) in 2013, Dieu Thuy kept her promise with her parents, which was to go back to her study at university, she gave up her acting career and become a safety engineer for a furniture company in Binh Duong. However, within the first few months in 2014, she decided to quit the job. During her experience trip, she applied and became a flight attendant for Etihad Airways of the United Arab Emirates. After two years of doing this job, she decided to study and became a pilot.

In June 2016, Dieu Thuy came back to Vietnam and took an entrance exam into Viet Flight Training (Vietnamese: Trường Phi công Bay Việt). (Note: Vietnam's first flight training school.) After that, she decided to attend Epic Flight Academy in the United States where she earned her private pilot license, instrument rating, and commercial pilot license, graduating in February 2018. Dieu Thuy was the first Vietnamese actress to become a pilot. During the time she practiced in America, she graduated earlier than expected and become a twin-engine commercial pilot. Until May 2018, she made up her mind to return to her home country Vietnam to look for opportunities to become an airline pilot. In 2019, she became the first female pilot in Vietnam at Bamboo Airways, which had just been founded at the time. According to VnExpress, as of 2019, there are only around 20 female airline pilots in Vietnam.

== Personal life ==
According to interviews, Dieu Thuy said her family is just a common family in the poor countryside, and her parents are both retired teachers. During the time studying and working in the United States, she met a hotel manager in France born in 1980, Antoine Aubry. Their wedding was in August 2018 in Quảng Trị, Dieu Thuy's hometown, which attracted the attention of the press and readers. According to Dieu Thuy, her husband is only an ordinary businessman, not the "rich man" as rumored. However, according to an interview in March 2021, she said that due to the work, they had "returned to be friends" and that she has been single for over a year.

== Judgement ==
Although Dieu Thuy's two main occupations are not related to her majors, but in both positions actor and pilot, Dieu Thuy received praise from people in the profession. During the recording process of the Legend of 1C, Dieu Thuy had to immerse herself in the lives of young volunteers during the war on her own, she was not afraid of the difficulty when filming, so she received a compliment on "quickly adapting to the job and showing promising future" from director Nguyen Thanh Van.

Captain Nguyen Nam Lien - director of the Viet Flight Training Institution once commented on Dieu Thuy:

I admire Thuy very much because she comes from showbiz, an environment if she didn’t show the will or follow her reason, she would not be able to follow the harsh journey of becoming pilots. Though she used to work as a flight attendant for one of the leading airways in the world, that was only a time for her to accumulate knowledge and gain experience to become a pilot.

== Beauty contest ==
Year	Contest	Award	Source
2009	21st Century Elegant Students	Miss Hospitality	
2010	Miss Cherry Blossom	Miss Ao Dai	
2011	Miss Sunplay	Won	

== Filmography ==
Year	Drama	Vietnamese	Role	Note	Film crew	Channel	Ref.
2011	A Foggy Slope	Dốc sương Mù	H'Mây	Main role	Director: Nguyễn Lê Minh	VTV9	
2012	The Legend of 1C	Huyền thoại 1C	Lê	Main role	Screenwriter: Anh Động; Director: Nguyễn Thanh Vân	HTV9; VTV1	
2012	The Storms of Life	Những mảnh đời giông bão	An Lành	Main role	Director: Hoàng Trung	HTVC; THTG	
2013	On the Other Riverbank	Bên kia sông	Minh Khuê	Secondary main role	Screenwriter: Ngô Hoàng Giang, Minh Diệu; Director: Đỗ Phú Hải, Phạm Minh Châu; Other cast: Việt Anh, Tạ Minh Tâm	HTV9	
2013	The Housemaid	Người giúp việc	Thắm	Secondary main role	Screenwriter: Châu Thổ, Đào Phương; Director: Diệp Quốc Thành; Other cast: Kim Xuân, Thanh Vy	HTV9	
2014	The Black Coin	Đồng tiền đen	Ánh Ngọc	Main role	Director: Bùi Cường; Other cast: Bình Minh, Hoàng Anh	HTVC; SCTV14	
