= Magomed Abdusalamov (taekwondo) =

Russian taekwondo practitioner (born 2002)

Personal information
- Native name: Магомед Абдусаламов
- Full name: Magomed Rabadan-Gadzhiyevich Abdusalamov
- Nationality: Russian
- Born: 10 August 2002 (age 24)

Sport
- Sport: Taekwondo
- Weight class: 74 kg
Medal record
Men's taekwondo
Representing Individual Neutral Athletes
World Championships
Bronze medal – third place	2025 Wuxi	74 kg

Magomed Rabadan-Gadzhiyevich Abdusalamov (Russian: Магомед Рабадан-Гаджиевич Абдусаламов; born 10 August 2002) is a Russian taekwondo practitioner. He won a bronze medal at the 2025 World Taekwondo Championships.

== Career ==
In February 2025, Abdusalamov competed at the Fujairah Open and won a gold medal in the 74 kg category. In April 2025, he competed at the Russian Taekwondo Championships and won a silver medal in the 74 kg category. The next month he competed at the 10th World Taekwondo President's Cup in Sofia, and won a gold medal in the 74 kg category. In October 2025, he competed at the 2025 World Taekwondo Championships and won a bronze medal in the 74 kg category, losing to eventual gold medalist Najmiddin Kosimkhojiev in the semifinals.
