= 2024 World Taekwondo Junior Championships =

2024 World Taekwondo Junior Championships (U18)
- Venue: Chuncheon Air Dome
- Location: Chuncheon, South Korea
- Dates: 1–6 October
- Competitors: 963 from 127 nations

The 2024 World Taekwondo Junior Championships (U15-18), the 14th edition of the World Taekwondo Junior Championships, was held in Chuncheon, South Korea from 1 to 6 October 2024.

Athletes born between Jan. 1, 2007 and Dec. 31, 2009 are eligible to compete at the World Taekwondo Junior Championships.

== Medal table ==
RUS + BLR = AIN

* Host nation (South Korea)

Rank	Nation	Gold	Silver	Bronze	Total
1	Iran	7	2	2	11
2	South Korea*	4	4	1	9
3	Croatia	2	0	2	4
4	Russia	1	1	3	5
5	Chinese Taipei	1	0	2	3
6	Greece	1	0	1	2
6	Uzbekistan	1	0	1	2
8	Morocco	1	0	0	1
8	Philippines	1	0	0	1
8	Tunisia	1	0	0	1
11	China	0	2	3	5
12	Kazakhstan	0	2	1	3
13	Spain	0	1	4	5
14	Turkey	0	1	3	4
15	Mexico	0	1	1	2
15	Poland	0	1	1	2
17	Australia	0	1	0	1
17	Bulgaria	0	1	0	1
17	Costa Rica	0	1	0	1
17	Moldova	0	1	0	1
17	United States	0	1	0	1
22	Azerbaijan	0	0	2	2
22	Canada	0	0	2	2
22	India	0	0	2	2
22	Italy	0	0	2	2
26	Belarus	0	0	1	1
26	Egypt	0	0	1	1
26	France	0	0	1	1
26	Ivory Coast	0	0	1	1
26	Jordan	0	0	1	1
26	Thailand	0	0	1	1
26	Ukraine	0	0	1	1
Totals (32 entries)		20	20	40	80

== Medal summary ==
=== Men ===
Event	Gold	Silver	Bronze
−45 kg	Dilmurodjon Marufjonov; Uzbekistan	Jorge Armando Rodríguez; Mexico	Zach Gillis; Canada
−45 kg	Dilmurodjon Marufjonov; Uzbekistan	Jorge Armando Rodríguez; Mexico	Jang Sang-won; South Korea
−48 kg	Mehdi Razmian; Iran	Jairo Agenjo; Spain	Temirzhan Taskyn; Kazakhstan
−48 kg	Mehdi Razmian; Iran	Jairo Agenjo; Spain	Bekhruz Salimov; Uzbekistan
−51 kg	Aristeidis Psarros; Greece	Artiom Roșca; Moldova	Shukla Ayush; India
−51 kg	Aristeidis Psarros; Greece	Artiom Roșca; Moldova	Amir Mohammad Nasirahmadi; Iran
−55 kg	Sina Mohtarami; Iran	Nurali Makhmut; Kazakhstan	Azat Besaev; Authorised Neutral Athletes
−55 kg	Sina Mohtarami; Iran	Nurali Makhmut; Kazakhstan	Tang Haoran; China
−59 kg	Sim Jun-ho; South Korea	Yusuf Badem; Turkey	Mahmoud Yousif; Jordan
−59 kg	Sim Jun-ho; South Korea	Yusuf Badem; Turkey	Samir Mirzoiev; Ukraine
−63 kg	Jung Jae-bin; South Korea	Stanislav Mitkov; Bulgaria	David Valdés; Mexico
−63 kg	Jung Jae-bin; South Korea	Stanislav Mitkov; Bulgaria	Vasif Salimov; Azerbaijan
−68 kg	Amir Vykov; Authorised Neutral Athletes	Lee Jun-hyuk; South Korea	Krittayot Phrompatju; Thailand
−68 kg	Amir Vykov; Authorised Neutral Athletes	Lee Jun-hyuk; South Korea	Omar Muhammad Fathy; Egypt
-73 kg	Park Jae-won; South Korea	Ali Akbar Ebrahimi; Iran	Angelo Mangione; Italy
-73 kg	Park Jae-won; South Korea	Ali Akbar Ebrahimi; Iran	Huseyn Khudiyev; Azerbaijan
-78 kg	Oscar Kovačič; Croatia	Michał Szadkowski; Poland	Jesús Pacheco; Spain
-78 kg	Oscar Kovačič; Croatia	Michał Szadkowski; Poland	Amin Ahmadvand; Iran
+78 kg	Amir Mohammad Ashrafi; Iran	Aiden Stilley; Australia	Matteo De Angelis; Italy
+78 kg	Amir Mohammad Ashrafi; Iran	Aiden Stilley; Australia	Ivan Lysenko; Spain

=== Women ===
Event	Gold	Silver	Bronze
−42 kg	Ghazal Houshmand; Iran	Yang Xiruo; China	Saksham Yadav; India
−42 kg	Ghazal Houshmand; Iran	Yang Xiruo; China	Elina Tkhamokova; Authorised Neutral Athletes
−44 kg	Wang Chieh‐ling; Chinese Taipei	Shin Su‐in; South Korea	Rüveyda Nur Evin; Turkey
−44 kg	Wang Chieh‐ling; Chinese Taipei	Shin Su‐in; South Korea	Li Siyong; China
−46 kg	Lee Yu-min; South Korea	Jaycee Bassett; Costa Rica	Oumaima Allassak; France
−46 kg	Lee Yu-min; South Korea	Jaycee Bassett; Costa Rica	Violeta Díaz; Spain
−49 kg	Tachiana Mangin; Philippines	Kim Hyang‐gi; South Korea	Aiuna Menkenova; Authorised Neutral Athletes
−49 kg	Tachiana Mangin; Philippines	Kim Hyang‐gi; South Korea	Lamprini Asimaki; Greece
−52 kg	Parnian Nouri; Iran	Xu Yinuo; China	Noa Romero; Spain
−52 kg	Parnian Nouri; Iran	Xu Yinuo; China	Sıla Irmak Uzunçavdar; Turkey
−55 kg	Amina Dehhaoui; Morocco	Aminat Ramazanova; Authorised Neutral Athletes	Ema Bugarinović; Croatia
−55 kg	Amina Dehhaoui; Morocco	Aminat Ramazanova; Authorised Neutral Athletes	Mümüne Nur Göz; Turkey
−59 kg	Aynaz Nasiri; Iran	Nuray Kaznabek; Kazakhstan	Ella Brewster; Canada
−59 kg	Aynaz Nasiri; Iran	Nuray Kaznabek; Kazakhstan	Marija Uglešić; Croatia
−63 kg	Wafa Masghouni; Tunisia	Saghar Moradi; Iran	Wang Chengyi; China
−63 kg	Wafa Masghouni; Tunisia	Saghar Moradi; Iran	Lin Hsin-tung; Chinese Taipei
−68 kg	Hana Zarinkamar; Iran	Lim Ye-rim; South Korea	Julia Nowak; Poland
−68 kg	Hana Zarinkamar; Iran	Lim Ye-rim; South Korea	Wang Wei‐chia; Chinese Taipei
+68 kg	Magdalena Matić; Croatia	Naomi Alade; United States	Kimi Laurène Ossin; Ivory Coast
+68 kg	Magdalena Matić; Croatia	Naomi Alade; United States	Palina Mikhalchuk; Authorised Neutral Athletes (BLR)
