= Amir Sina Bakhtiari =

Iranian taekwondo practitioner)

Personal information
- Nationality: Iranian
- Born: March 17, 2002 (age 24)

Sport
- Sport: Taekwondo
- Weight class: 74 kg
Medal record
Men's taekwondo
Representing Iran
World Championships
| Bronze medal – third place | 2025 Wuxi | 74 kg |
Asian Championships
| Gold medal – first place | 2026 Ulaanbaatar | 74 kg |
World Junior Championships
| Gold medal – first place | 2018 Hammamet | 55 kg |

Amir Sina Bakhtiari is an Iranian taekwondo practitioner. He won a bronze medal at the 2025 World Taekwondo Championships.

== Career ==
Bakhtiari competed at the 2018 World Taekwondo Junior Championships and won a gold medal in the 55 kg category.

In April 2025, he competed at the 7th World Taekwondo President's Cup in Tai'an, China, and won a gold medal in the 74 kg category. In October 2025, he competed at the 2025 World Taekwondo Championships and won a bronze medal in the 74 kg category, losing to Edival Pontes in the semifinals.
