= Liên Thị Tuyết Mai =

Vietnamese Taekwondo athlete

Personal information
- Born: Liên Thị Tuyết Mai; 19 February 1992 (age 34) Ho Chi Minh City, Vietnam
- Occupation: Taekwondo athlete
Medal record
Professional Taekwondo athlete
Representing Vietnam
SEA Games
| Gold medal – first place | 2019 Philippines | Women's team poomsae |

Liên Thị Tuyết Mai (born 19 February 1992) is a Vietnamese Taekwondo athlete. She is a member of the Vietnam national Taekwondo team.

== Career ==
Mai won a gold medal in the five-member team event at the World Championships in 2011, a silver medal in the individual event at the World and Asian Championships in 2012, a silver medal at the World Championships in 2016, and a gold medal at the 2018 Asian Taekwondo Poomsae Championships.

=== 2019 ===
The three athletes Ngô Thị Thuỳ Dung, Mai, and Nguyễn Thị Lệ Kim earned a score of 8.210 to win the gold medal at the 2019 Southeast Asian Games.

=== 2024 ===
On 15 May 2024, Châu Tuyết Vân, Mai, and Nguyễn Thị Lệ Kim won the gold medal in the women's team standard poomsae T30 event at the 2024 Asian Taekwondo Poomsae Championships.

=== 2026 ===
In the morning of 20 May 2026, in the women's U40 standard team poomsae event at the 2026 Asian Taekwondo Championships (19–26 May), Châu Tuyết Vân, Nguyễn Thị Lệ Kim, and Mai won the gold medal for the Vietnamese team.

== Honours ==
- Labor Order First Class (2025)
