= Victor Rodrigues (taekwondo) =

American taekwondo practitioner

Personal information
- Nationality: American
- Weight: 74 kg (163 lb)

Sport
- Country: United States
- Sport: Taekwondo
- Event: Men's −74 kg
Medal record
Men's taekwondo
Representing United States
Pan American Championships
Bronze medal – third place	2026 Rio de Janeiro	74 kg
World U21 Championships
Bronze medal – third place	2025 Nairobi	74 kg

Victor Rodrigues is an American taekwondo practitioner. He was a bronze medalist at the 2026 Pan American Taekwondo Championships.

== Career ==
Rodrigues attended Pompano Beach High School in Florida. He started in taekwondo at the age of four years-old is part of the Harvest Olympic Program, located in Margate, Florida. He is coached by his father, Lucas Rodrigues.

In September 2025, Rodrigues placed second to Edival Pontes of Brazil at the WT President's Cup America in Lima, Peru. The following month, Rodrigues was a quarter-finalist at the 2025 World Taekwondo Championships in Wuxi, China, in the men's lightweight category. Later that year, he was a bronze medalist at the 2025 World U21 Taekwondo Championships in Nairobi, Kenya, in the men's -74kg division.

Rodrigues won in Calgary and Las Vegas on the international taekwondo circuit in March 2026. He won a bronze medal at the 2026 Pan American Taekwondo Championships in the -74 kg category in Rio de Janeiro.
