= 2018 World Taekwondo Junior Championships =

International Taekwondo junior championships

- Venue: Hammamet Sports Hall
- Location: Hammamet, Tunisia
- Dates: 9-13 April
- Competitors: 963 from 127 nations

The 2018 World Taekwondo Junior Championships, the 12th edition of the World Taekwondo Junior Championships, was held in Hammamet, Tunisia from 9 to 13 April 2018.

== Medal table ==
* Host nation (Tunisia)

| Rank | Nation | Gold | Silver | Bronze | Total |
|---|---|---|---|---|---|
| 1 | Iran | 7 | 0 | 3 | 10 |
| 2 | South Korea | 2 | 2 | 3 | 7 |
| 3 | Serbia | 2 | 0 | 1 | 3 |
| 4 | Great Britain | 2 | 0 | 0 | 2 |
| 5 | Turkey | 1 | 3 | 0 | 4 |
| 6 | United States | 1 | 2 | 0 | 3 |
| 7 | Russia | 1 | 1 | 7 | 9 |
| 8 | Chinese Taipei | 1 | 1 | 2 | 4 |
| 9 | Azerbaijan | 1 | 1 | 0 | 2 |
| 10 | France | 1 | 0 | 0 | 1 |
| 10 | Vietnam | 1 | 0 | 0 | 1 |
| 12 | Thailand | 0 | 2 | 1 | 3 |
| 12 | Uzbekistan | 0 | 2 | 1 | 3 |
| 14 | China | 0 | 1 | 2 | 3 |
| 15 | Croatia | 0 | 1 | 1 | 2 |
| 16 | Argentina | 0 | 1 | 0 | 1 |
| 16 | Canada | 0 | 1 | 0 | 1 |
| 16 | Italy | 0 | 1 | 0 | 1 |
| 16 | Poland | 0 | 1 | 0 | 1 |
| 20 | Germany | 0 | 0 | 5 | 5 |
| 21 | Brazil | 0 | 0 | 2 | 2 |
| 22 | Belarus | 0 | 0 | 1 | 1 |
| 22 | Belgium | 0 | 0 | 1 | 1 |
| 22 | Bosnia and Herzegovina | 0 | 0 | 1 | 1 |
| 22 | Greece | 0 | 0 | 1 | 1 |
| 22 | India | 0 | 0 | 1 | 1 |
| 22 | Netherlands | 0 | 0 | 1 | 1 |
| 22 | Niger | 0 | 0 | 1 | 1 |
| 22 | North Macedonia | 0 | 0 | 1 | 1 |
| 22 | Saudi Arabia | 0 | 0 | 1 | 1 |
| 22 | Slovakia | 0 | 0 | 1 | 1 |
| 22 | Tunisia* | 0 | 0 | 1 | 1 |
| 22 | Ukraine | 0 | 0 | 1 | 1 |
| Totals (33 entries) | | 20 | 20 | 40 | 80 |

== Medal summary ==
=== Men ===
| Event | Gold | Silver | Bronze |
|---|---|---|---|
| −45 kg | Hossein Lotfi; Iran | Amirbek Turaev; Uzbekistan | Kanha Mainali; India |
| −45 kg | Hossein Lotfi; Iran | Amirbek Turaev; Uzbekistan | Jang-hoe Lee; South Korea |
| −48 kg | Jin-ho Kim; South Korea | Görkem Polat; Turkey | Dmitrii Shishko; Russia |
| −48 kg | Jin-ho Kim; South Korea | Görkem Polat; Turkey | Peerakit Tharanantaseth; Thailand |
| −51 kg | Amir Alipour; Iran | Khanoghlan Karimov; Azerbaijan | Po Kai Lai; Chinese Taipei |
| −51 kg | Amir Alipour; Iran | Khanoghlan Karimov; Azerbaijan | Ulugbek Rashitov; Uzbekistan |
| −55 kg | Amir Sina Bakhtiari; Iran | José Luis Acuña; Argentina | Georgy Popov; Russia |
| −55 kg | Amir Sina Bakhtiari; Iran | José Luis Acuña; Argentina | Mahamadou Amadou; Niger |
| −59 kg | Hamed Asghari Mahiabadi; Iran | Arslan Demir; Turkey | Gabriel Ramos; Brazil |
| −59 kg | Hamed Asghari Mahiabadi; Iran | Arslan Demir; Turkey | Young-Jun Lee; South Korea |
| −63 kg | Javad Aghayev; Azerbaijan | Gabriele Caulo; Italy | Nedžad Husić; Bosnia and Herzegovina |
| −63 kg | Javad Aghayev; Azerbaijan | Gabriele Caulo; Italy | Erfan Moradi; Iran |
| −68 kg | Mohammad Mahdi Emadi; Iran | Carl Nickolas; United States | Dušan Božanić; Serbia |
| −68 kg | Mohammad Mahdi Emadi; Iran | Carl Nickolas; United States | Ivan Paulouski; Belarus |
| -73 kg | Ali Eshkevarian; Iran | Adrian Wojtkowiak; Poland | Vladyslav Yerko; Ukraine |
| -73 kg | Ali Eshkevarian; Iran | Adrian Wojtkowiak; Poland | Badr Achab; Belgium |
| -78 kg | Mohammadali Khosravi; Iran | Jin-Hong Lim; South Korea | Ali Almabrouk; Saudi Arabia |
| -78 kg | Mohammadali Khosravi; Iran | Jin-Hong Lim; South Korea | Zhengyang Li; China |
| +78 kg | Emre Kutalmış Ateşli; Turkey | Lee Meng-en; Chinese Taipei | Nima Mehrali; Iran |
| +78 kg | Emre Kutalmış Ateşli; Turkey | Lee Meng-en; Chinese Taipei | Patrik Pereira Cardoso; Brazil |

=== Women ===
| Event | Gold | Silver | Bronze |
|---|---|---|---|
| −42 kg | Mi-Reu Kang; South Korea | Emine Göğebakan; Turkey | Mobina Kalivand; Iran |
| −42 kg | Mi-Reu Kang; South Korea | Emine Göğebakan; Turkey | Larisa Medvedeva; Russia |
| −44 kg | Jordyn Smith; Great Britain | Chutikan Jongkolrattanawattana; Thailand | Anastasia Artamonova; Russia |
| −44 kg | Jordyn Smith; Great Britain | Chutikan Jongkolrattanawattana; Thailand | Lena Stojković; Croatia |
| −46 kg | Aaliyah Powell; Great Britain | Kanrawee Sompan; Thailand | Lea Anais Karmely; Germany |
| −46 kg | Aaliyah Powell; Great Britain | Kanrawee Sompan; Thailand | Chaima Toumi; Tunisia |
| −49 kg | Hồ Thi Kim Ngân; Vietnam | Josipa Kafadar; Canada | Laura Goebel; Germany |
| −49 kg | Hồ Thi Kim Ngân; Vietnam | Josipa Kafadar; Canada | Anna Kazarnovskaia; Russia |
| −52 kg | Anastasija Zolotic; United States | Ozoda Sobirjonova; Uzbekistan | Vanessa Beckstein; Germany |
| −52 kg | Anastasija Zolotic; United States | Ozoda Sobirjonova; Uzbekistan | Gabriela Briškárová; Slovakia |
| −55 kg | Lo Chia-ling; Chinese Taipei | Anastasiia Nosova; Russia | Fani Tzeli; Greece |
| −55 kg | Lo Chia-ling; Chinese Taipei | Anastasiia Nosova; Russia | Yang Junli; China |
| −59 kg | Serdja Stević; Serbia | Ju-A Park; South Korea | Anamarija Georgievska; North Macedonia |
| −59 kg | Serdja Stević; Serbia | Ju-A Park; South Korea | Lilia Khuzina; Russia |
| −63 kg | Nadica Božanić; Serbia | Nika Klepac; Croatia | Yu-Jin Jang; South Korea |
| −63 kg | Nadica Božanić; Serbia | Nika Klepac; Croatia | Celine Schmidt; Germany |
| −68 kg | Althéa Laurin; France | Alena Viana; United States | Valaeria Mokeeva; Russia |
| −68 kg | Althéa Laurin; France | Alena Viana; United States | Darija Husovic; Germany |
| +68 kg | Kristina Adebaio; Russia | Wenzhe Mu; China | Isabeau van Droffelaar; Netherlands |
| +68 kg | Kristina Adebaio; Russia | Wenzhe Mu; China | Chieh-Yu Lin; Chinese Taipei |
