= Hứa Văn Huy =

Vietnamese Taekwondo

Personal information
- Nationality: Vietnam
- Born: Hứa Văn Huy; 18 September 1995 (age 30) Thành phố Hồ Chí Minh, Việt Nam
- Occupation: Athletes Taekwondo

Sport
- Sport: Taekwondo

Medal record

Professional Taekwondo athlete

Representing Vietnam

SEA Games
Gold medal – first place	2019 Philippines	The men's team event
Gold medal – first place	2021 Việt Nam	The men's team event
Gold medal – first place	2023 Campuchia	The creative mixed team event

Hứa Văn Huy (born 18 September 1995) is a Vietnamese Taekwondo athlete. He is a member of the Vietnamese Taekwondo national team.

== Career ==
Hứa Văn Huy and Châu Tuyết Vân won silver medals at the 2019 Chungju World Martial Arts Masterships.

Trần Hồ Duy - Châu Tuyết Vân - Nguyễn Thị Lệ Kim - Hứa Văn Huy - Nguyễn Ngọc Minh Hy (Taekwondo, creative mixed team event) won a gold medal at the 2019 Southeast Asian Games.

He participated in the performance of a creative form with five athletes (three males: Hứa Văn Huy, Nguyễn Ngọc Minh Hy, and Trần Đăng Khoa; two females: Châu Tuyết Vân, Nguyễn Thị Lệ Kim). With various high-level techniques such as spinning kicks and aerial maneuvers, they achieved a score of 7.799. They won a gold medal at the 2021 Southeast Asian Games.

Châu Tuyết Vân, Hứa Văn Huy, Lê Ngọc Hân, Nguyễn Thị Y Bình, and Trần Đăng Khoa competed in the mixed gender creative team event at the 2023 US Open Taekwondo Championships, where they won a gold medal.

On 12 May 2023, in the finals of the mixed gender creative team event, Nguyễn Ngọc Minh Hy, Nguyễn Thị Mộng Quỳnh, Hứa Văn Huy, Châu Tuyết Vân, and Trần Đăng Khoa won a gold medal at the 2023 Southeast Asian Games.

== Notable achievements ==
=== Sports ===
Year	Competition	Venue	Achievement	Source
2019	2019 Southeast Asian Games	Philippines	Gold medal	
2021	2021 Southeast Asian Games	Vietnam	Gold medal	
2023	SEA Games 32	Cambodia	Gold medal	
