= 2026 Asian Taekwondo Championships =

Taekwondo competition

- Venue: M Bank Arena
- Location: Ulaanbaatar, Mongolia
- Dates: 21–24 May 2026

Champions
- Men: South Korea
- Women: Chinese Taipei

The 2026 Asian Taekwondo Championships were the 27th edition of the Asian Taekwondo Championships, and were held from 21 to 24 May 2026 in M Bank Arena, Ulaanbaatar, Mongolia.

It also acted as the qualification tournament for the 2026 Asian Games in Japan.

== Medal summary ==
=== Men ===
Event	Gold	Silver	Bronze
Finweight −54 kg	Jaafar Al-Daoud; Jordan	Yasin Valizadeh; Iran	Yerkebulan Yensegenov; Kazakhstan
Finweight −54 kg	Jaafar Al-Daoud; Jordan	Yasin Valizadeh; Iran	Jakhongir Khudayberdiev; Uzbekistan
Flyweight −58 kg	Abolfazl Zandi; Iran	Yang Hui-chan; South Korea	Omonjon Otajonov; Uzbekistan
Flyweight −58 kg	Abolfazl Zandi; Iran	Yang Hui-chan; South Korea	Kim Jong-myeong; South Korea
Bantamweight −63 kg	Mehdi Haji Mousaei; Iran	Jang Jun; South Korea	Nazarali Nazarov; Uzbekistan
Bantamweight −63 kg	Mehdi Haji Mousaei; Iran	Jang Jun; South Korea	Samirkhon Ababakirov; Kazakhstan
Featherweight −68 kg	Mun Jin-ho; South Korea	Diyorbek Tukhliboev; Uzbekistan	Chen Yufan; China
Featherweight −68 kg	Mun Jin-ho; South Korea	Diyorbek Tukhliboev; Uzbekistan	Zaid Kareem; Jordan
Lightweight −74 kg	Amir Sina Bakhtiari; Iran	Cai Zhaoxun; China	Najmiddin Kosimkhojiev; Uzbekistan
Lightweight −74 kg	Amir Sina Bakhtiari; Iran	Cai Zhaoxun; China	Eldar Birimbay; Kazakhstan
Welterweight −80 kg	Seo Geon-woo; South Korea	Jasurbek Jaysunov; Uzbekistan	Amir Reza Sadeghian; Iran
Welterweight −80 kg	Seo Geon-woo; South Korea	Jasurbek Jaysunov; Uzbekistan	Mohammad Al-Adarbi; Jordan
Middleweight −87 kg	Park Woo-hyeok; South Korea	Yodgorbek Zhuraboev; Uzbekistan	Chen Liang-hsi; Chinese Taipei
Middleweight −87 kg	Park Woo-hyeok; South Korea	Yodgorbek Zhuraboev; Uzbekistan	Meng Mingkuan; China
Heavyweight +87 kg	Arian Salimi; Iran	Marat Mavlonov; Uzbekistan	Kang Sang-hyun; South Korea
Heavyweight +87 kg	Arian Salimi; Iran	Marat Mavlonov; Uzbekistan	Tang Hao; China

=== Women ===
Event	Gold	Silver	Bronze
Finweight −46 kg	Wang Chieh-ling; Chinese Taipei	Patcharakan Poolkerd; Thailand	Clarence Sarza; Philippines
Finweight −46 kg	Wang Chieh-ling; Chinese Taipei	Patcharakan Poolkerd; Thailand	Lee Yu-min; South Korea
Flyweight −49 kg	Kim Hyang-gi; South Korea	Liu You-yun; Chinese Taipei	Fu Xiaolu; China
Flyweight −49 kg	Kim Hyang-gi; South Korea	Liu You-yun; Chinese Taipei	Ma Jingyue; China
Bantamweight −53 kg	Zuo Ju; China	Dunya Abutaleb; Saudi Arabia	Kashish Malik; India
Bantamweight −53 kg	Zuo Ju; China	Dunya Abutaleb; Saudi Arabia	Seo Yeo-won; South Korea
Featherweight −57 kg	Nahid Kiani; Iran	Madina Mirabzalova; Uzbekistan	Kim Yu-jin; South Korea
Featherweight −57 kg	Nahid Kiani; Iran	Madina Mirabzalova; Uzbekistan	Lin Wei-chun; Chinese Taipei
Lightweight −62 kg	Chang Jui-en; Chinese Taipei	Luo Zongshi; China	Yalda Valinejad; Iran
Lightweight −62 kg	Chang Jui-en; Chinese Taipei	Luo Zongshi; China	Lee Ga-eun; South Korea
Welterweight −67 kg	Ozoda Sobirjonova; Uzbekistan	Kwak Min-ju; South Korea	Razan Al-Rawashdeh; Jordan
Welterweight −67 kg	Ozoda Sobirjonova; Uzbekistan	Kwak Min-ju; South Korea	Xing Jiani; China
Middleweight −73 kg	Xiao Shunan; China	Song Jie; China	Nazym Makhmutova; Kazakhstan
Middleweight −73 kg	Xiao Shunan; China	Song Jie; China	Etisha Das; India
Heavyweight +73 kg	Svetlana Osipova; Uzbekistan	Song Da-bin; South Korea	Zhou Zeqi; China
Heavyweight +73 kg	Svetlana Osipova; Uzbekistan	Song Da-bin; South Korea	Xu Lei; China

== Medal table ==
Rank	Nation	Gold	Silver	Bronze	Total
1	Iran	5	1	2	8
2	South Korea	4	4	6	14
3	Uzbekistan	2	5	4	11
4	China	2	3	8	13
5	Chinese Taipei	2	1	2	5
6	Jordan	1	0	3	4
7	Saudi Arabia	0	1	0	1
7	Thailand	0	1	0	1
9	Kazakhstan	0	0	4	4
10	India	0	0	2	2
11	Philippines	0	0	1	1
Totals (11 entries)		16	16	32	64

== Team ranking ==
=== Men ===
Rank	Team	Points
1	South Korea	484
2	Iran	463
3	Jordan	176
4	Uzbekistan	133
5	China	91
6	Kazakhstan	58
7	Chinese Taipei	35
8	Thailand	14
9	India	12
10	Philippines	9

=== Women ===
Rank	Team	Points
1	Chinese Taipei	334
2	South Korea	308
3	China	257
4	Iran	159
5	Thailand	63
6	Saudi Arabia	57
7	India	55
8	Kazakhstan	34
9	Jordan	29
10	Philippines	29
