= Charalampos Flouskounis =

Greek taekwondo practitioner

Personal information
- Nationality: Greek

Sport
- Sport: Taekwondo
- Event: 74 kg
Medal record
Men's taekwondo
Representing Greece
European Championships
Bronze medal – third place	2024 Belgrade	74 kg

Charalampos Flouskounis is a Greek taekwondo practitioner. He was a bronze medalist at the 2024 European Taekwondo Championships.

== Career ==
From Patras, he trained as a member of Fight Club Patras, and represented Greece at the European U21 Taekwondo Championships in 2021.

Flouskounis was a bronze medalist at the 2024 European Taekwondo Championships in the men's 74 kg division in Belgrade in May 2024.

He placed third in the -74kgg category at the Galeb Trophy Taekwondo Open in April 2025 in Belgrade, Serbia. He earned bronze at the 2025 Austrian Open in Innsbruck, Austria, in June 2025. He won the Greek title over -74 kg in September 2025. He was subsequently selected to compete at the 2025 World Taekwondo Championships in Wuxi, China, in October 2025, in the men's lightweight division.
