= Belgium at the 2021 Summer World University Games =

- Flag of Belgium
- IOC code: BEL

in Chengdu, China 28 July 2023 – 8 August 2023
- Competitors: 5 (3 men and 2 women)
- Medals Ranked 50th: Gold 0 Silver 0 Bronze 1 Total 1

Summer World University Games appearances
- 1959; 1961; 1963; 1965; 1967; 1970; 1973; 1975; 1977; 1979; 1981; 1983; 1985; 1987; 1989; 1991; 1993; 1995; 1997; 1999; 2001; 2003; 2005; 2007; 2009; 2011; 2013; 2015; 2017; 2019; 2021; 2025; 2027

Belgium competed at the 2021 Summer World University Games in Chengdu, China held from 28 July to 8 August 2023.

== Medal summary ==
=== Medal by sports ===
Rank	Sports	Gold	Silver	Bronze	Total
1	Taekwondo	0	0	1	1
Totals (1 entries)		0	0	1	1

=== Medalists ===
Medal	Name	Sport	Event	Day
Bronze	Sarah Chaari	Taekwondo	Women's 67 kg	1 August
