= Najmiddin Kosimkhojiev =

Uzbekistani taekwondo practitioner (born 2004)

Personal information
- Nationality: Uzbekistani
- Born: 28 August 2004 (age 22)

Sport
- Sport: Taekwondo
- Weight class: 74 kg
Medal record
Men's taekwondo
Representing Uzbekistan
World Championships
Gold medal – first place	2025 Wuxi	74 kg
Asian Championships
Bronze medal – third place	2024 Da Nang	74 kg
Bronze medal – third place	2026 Ulaanbaatar	74 kg
World University Games
Gold medal – first place	2025 Rhine–Ruhr	Mixed team
Bronze medal – third place	2021 Chengdu	74 kg
Bronze medal – third place	2025 Rhine–Ruhr	74 kg
Islamic Solidarity Games
Silver medal – second place	2025 Riyadh	74 kg

Najmiddin Kosimkhojiev (born 28 August 2004) is an Uzbekistani taekwondo practitioner. He won a gold medal at the 2025 World Taekwondo Championships.

== Career ==
Khudayberdiev competed at the 2024 Asian Taekwondo Championships and won a bronze medal in the 74 kg category.

In July 2025, he competed at the 2025 Summer World University Games and won a gold medal in the mixed team kyorugi event, making its debut as a medal event at the FISU World University Games. He also won a bronze medal in the 74 kg category. In October 2025, he competed at the 2025 World Taekwondo Championships and won a gold medal in the 74 kg category, defeating Edival Pontes in the finals.
