= Ivan Lysenko =

Russian politician (1947–2026)

- Иван Лысенко

Member of the Soviet of the Union
- In office 25 July 1974 – 11 April 1984

Personal details
- Born: Ivan Egorovich Lysenko; 18 February 1947 Kushchyovsky District, Russian SFSR, Soviet Union
- Died: 11 February 2026 (aged 78) Kushchyovskaya, Russia
- Party: CPSU
- Education: Kuban State Agricultural Institute
- Occupation: Farmer

Ivan Egorovich Lysenko (Russian: Ива́н Его́рович Лысе́нко; 18 February 1947 – 11 February 2026) was a Russian politician. A member of the Communist Party of the Soviet Union, he served in the Soviet of the Union from 1974 to 1984.

Lysenko died in Kushchyovskaya on 11 February 2026, at the age of 78.
