= World Cadet Taekwondo Championships =

Taekwondo competition

- Current event or competition: 2025 World Cadet Taekwondo Championships

Competition details
- Discipline: Taekwondo
- Type: Kyorugi, biennial
- Organiser: World Taekwondo

History
- First edition: 2014

The World Cadet Taekwondo Championships is a worldwide biennial championship organized for cadets age category by World Taekwondo, first held in 2014 in Baku. The event is contested every two years. The current event held in 2025.

== Editions ==
1. 2014 Baku, Azerbaijan
2. 2015 Muju, South Korea
3. 2017 Sharm el Sheikh, Egypt
4. 2019 Tashkent, Uzbekistan
5. 2022 Sofia, Bulgaria
6. 2023 Sarajevo, Bosnia and Herzegovina
7. 2025 Fujairah, United Arab Emirates

== Medal table ==
All results from 2014 to 2025
| Rank | Nation | Gold | Silver | Bronze | Total |
|---|---|---|---|---|---|
| 1 | Iran | 36 | 21 | 12 | 69 |
| 2 | South Korea | 20 | 13 | 16 | 49 |
| 3 | Thailand | 13 | 10 | 13 | 36 |
| 4 | Russia | 9 | 16 | 12 | 37 |
| 5 | Mexico | 7 | 4 | 16 | 27 |
| – | Individual Neutral Athletes | 7 | 3 | 6 | 16 |
| 6 | Turkey | 6 | 9 | 24 | 39 |
| 7 | Uzbekistan | 6 | 1 | 17 | 24 |
| 8 | Kazakhstan | 5 | 7 | 11 | 23 |
| 9 | Ukraine | 5 | 4 | 8 | 17 |
| 10 | Chinese Taipei | 4 | 4 | 13 | 21 |
| 11 | Italy | 3 | 5 | 5 | 13 |
| 12 | United States | 3 | 3 | 11 | 17 |
| 13 | Germany | 2 | 2 | 8 | 12 |
| 14 | Croatia | 2 | 2 | 4 | 8 |
| 15 | Serbia | 1 | 7 | 3 | 11 |
| 16 | Azerbaijan | 1 | 3 | 7 | 11 |
| 17 | France | 1 | 3 | 6 | 10 |
| 18 | Egypt | 1 | 2 | 12 | 15 |
| 19 | Spain | 1 | 2 | 9 | 12 |
| 20 | Jordan | 1 | 2 | 3 | 6 |
| 21 | Philippines | 1 | 1 | 3 | 5 |
| 22 | Bulgaria | 1 | 1 | 1 | 3 |
| 23 | Morocco | 1 | 0 | 2 | 3 |
| 24 | El Salvador | 1 | 0 | 0 | 1 |
| 24 | Ivory Coast | 1 | 0 | 0 | 1 |
| 24 | Saudi Arabia | 1 | 0 | 0 | 1 |
| 27 | Greece | 0 | 3 | 7 | 10 |
| 28 | Great Britain | 0 | 1 | 5 | 6 |
| 29 | Australia | 0 | 1 | 4 | 5 |
| 29 | Belarus | 0 | 1 | 4 | 5 |
| 31 | Belgium | 0 | 1 | 3 | 4 |
| 31 | India | 0 | 1 | 3 | 4 |
| 33 | Canada | 0 | 1 | 2 | 3 |
| 34 | Colombia | 0 | 1 | 1 | 2 |
| 34 | Palestine | 0 | 1 | 1 | 2 |
| 36 | Finland | 0 | 1 | 0 | 1 |
| 36 | Georgia | 0 | 1 | 0 | 1 |
| 36 | Latvia | 0 | 1 | 0 | 1 |
| 36 | Oman | 0 | 1 | 0 | 1 |
| 36 | Vietnam | 0 | 1 | 0 | 1 |
| 41 | Tunisia | 0 | 0 | 3 | 3 |
| 42 | Denmark | 0 | 0 | 2 | 2 |
| 42 | Lebanon | 0 | 0 | 2 | 2 |
| 42 | Moldova | 0 | 0 | 2 | 2 |
| 42 | Poland | 0 | 0 | 2 | 2 |
| 46 | Andorra | 0 | 0 | 1 | 1 |
| 46 | Bosnia and Herzegovina | 0 | 0 | 1 | 1 |
| 46 | Brazil | 0 | 0 | 1 | 1 |
| 46 | Costa Rica | 0 | 0 | 1 | 1 |
| 46 | Ecuador | 0 | 0 | 1 | 1 |
| 46 | French Polynesia | 0 | 0 | 1 | 1 |
| 46 | Haiti | 0 | 0 | 1 | 1 |
| 46 | Israel | 0 | 0 | 1 | 1 |
| 46 | Mongolia | 0 | 0 | 1 | 1 |
| 46 | Netherlands | 0 | 0 | 1 | 1 |
| 46 | Puerto Rico | 0 | 0 | 1 | 1 |
| 46 | Romania | 0 | 0 | 1 | 1 |
| 46 | Senegal | 0 | 0 | 1 | 1 |
| 46 | Slovenia | 0 | 0 | 1 | 1 |
| 46 | United Arab Emirates | 0 | 0 | 1 | 1 |
| Totals (60 entries) | | 140 | 141 | 278 | 559 |
