= National Sports Festival =

National Sports Festival may refer to:

- National Sports Festival of Japan
- Korean National Sports Festival
- Nigerian National Sports Festival
- The original name for the U.S. Olympic Festival
