= Angelo Mangione =

Italian taekwondo practitioner (born 2007)

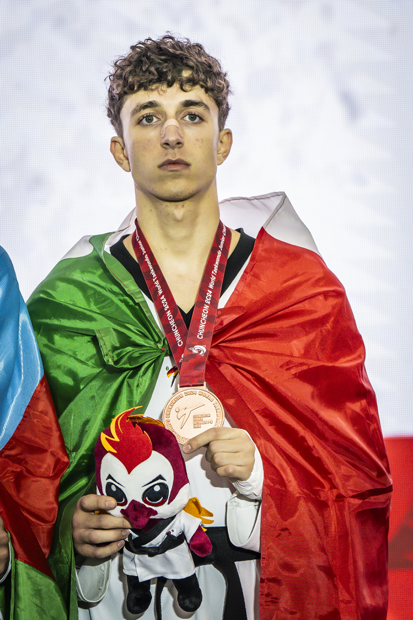
- Mangione at the World Junior Championships in October 2024

Personal information
- Nationality: Italian
- Born: 3 January 2007 (age 19) Leonforte, Sicily, Italy
- Height: 1.86 m (6 ft 1 in)
- Weight: 74 kg (163 lb)

Sport
- Sport: Taekwondo
- Weight class: 74 kg
Medal record
Men's taekwondo
Representing Italy
World Junior Championships
Gold medal – first place	2022 Sofia	68 kg
Bronze medal – third place	2024 Chuncheon	73 kg

Angelo Mangione (born 3 January 2007) is an Italian taekwondo practitioner enrolled in the Gruppi Sportivi Fiamme Gialle.

== Career ==
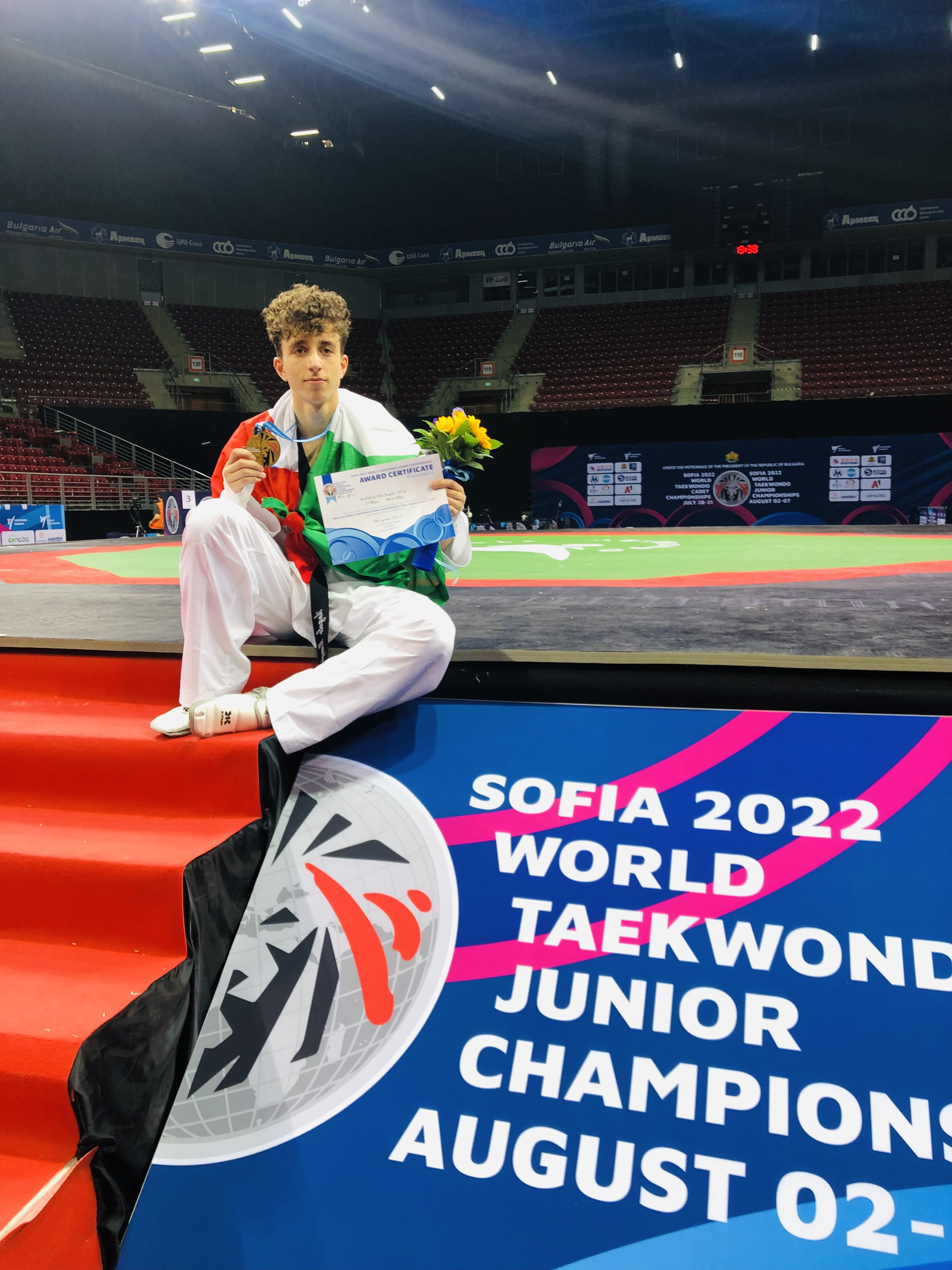
Mangione at the 2022 World Junior Championships

Mangione competed at the 2022 World Taekwondo Junior Championships in Sofia, Bulgaria, and won a gold medal in the 68 kg category. He again competed at the 2024 championships in Chuncheon, South Korea, and won a bronze medal in the 73 kg category.

In March 2025, he competed at the Dutch Open and won a bronze medal in the 74 kg category. The next month he competed at the 22nd Galeb Trophy Taekwondo Open and won a bronze medal in the 74 kg category. On 9 November 2025, he won the first taekwondo title for the Gruppi Sportivi Fiamme Gialle, winning a gold medal.
