= Cai Zhaoxun =

Chinese taekwondo practitioner

Personal information
- Nationality: Chinese

Sport
- Sport: Taekwondo
- Weight class: 74 kg
Medal record
Men's taekwondo
Representing China
Asian Championships
Silver medal – second place	2026 Ulaanbaatar	74 kg
Bronze medal – third place	2024 Da Nang	74 kg

Cai Zhaoxun is a Chinese taekwondo practitioner. He was a bronze medalist at the Asian Taekwondo Championships.

== Career ==
He competed at the 2024 Asian Taekwondo Championships and won a bronze medal in the 74 kg category. Having moved up a weight class; on 19 March 2025 at the Chinese National Taekwondo Championships Cai Zhaoxun won the men's 80 kg title. He subsequently competed for China at the 2025 World Taekwondo Championships in Wuxi, China.

== Personal life ==
Cai is from Xiamen in Fujian.
