= Nguyễn Thanh Huy =

Vietnamese Taekwondo

Personal information
- Nationality: Vietnam
- Born: Nguyễn Thanh Huy; February 22, 1969 (age 57) Bình Định, Bình Nghĩa, Vietnam
- Occupation: Athletes Taekwondo

Sport
- Sport: Taekwondo

Nguyễn Thanh Huy (born February 22, 1969) is a Taekwondo athlete and martial arts master. He is Vice President of the Vietnam Taekwondo Federation, Deputy Head of the Education Committee of the Asian Taekwondo Union, and head coach of the Vietnam national Taekwondo poomsae team. He holds an eighth-degree black belt (8th dan) certified by World Taekwondo Academy (Kukkiwon).

== Career ==
40 years of dedication to Taekwondo in Vietnam.

== Awards ==
- Labor Order First Class (2025)
