= Tôn Đức Thắng University =

Vietnamese university

Ton Duc Thang University
- Type: Public university
- Established: 1997
- President: Assoc. Prof. Dr. Tran Trong Dao
- Location: Main campus: 19, Nguyen Huu Tho Str., Tan Hung ward, Ho Chi Minh City, Vietnam; Khanh Hoa campus: 22 Nguyen Dinh Chieu Str., Bac Nha Trang ward, Khanh Hoa province; Bao Loc campus: Nguyen Tuan Str., 3 Bao Loc ward, Lam Dong province.
- Website: www.tdtu.edu.vn/en

Ton Duc Thang University (TDTU) is a public university in Vietnam. The school belongs to the Vietnam General Confederation of Labor. The university operates under a comprehensive autonomy mechanism and currently maintains campuses in several cities, including Ho Chi Minh City, Khanh Hoa Province, and Lam Dong Province.

== History ==
The former Ton Duc Thang University (Ton Duc Thang University: TDTU) is currently known as Ton Duc Thang Private University of Technology, established under the Prime Minister's Decision 787/ TTg-QĐ dated on September 24, 1997. The university was founded and is governed by the Ho Chi Minh City Labor Confederation through the Board of Directors chaired by the incumbent Chairman.

With the rapid development in all aspects of life, in order for TDTU to have legal entities being suitable to its real nature, (a public university with non-profit and absolutely without private elements), the Prime Minister issued Decision No. 18/2003/TTg-QĐ dated on January 28, 2003 to transform TDTU's legal entities and change its name to become Ton Duc Thang Semi-Public University directly under Ho Chi Minh City People's Committee.

With the fast growth, and in order to meet new needs, on June 11, 2008, which means approximately five and a half years after the semi-public entity, the Prime Minister once again issued Decision No. 747/TTg-QĐ changing Ton Duc Thang Semi-public University into Ton Duc Thang University governed by the Vietnam General Confederation of Labor.

== University rankings ==
University rankings

Global – Overall
- ARWU World: 601–700 (2022)
- QS World: =684 (2026)
- THE World: 601–800 (2024)
- USNWR Global: =383 (2025)

Regional – Overall
- QS Asia: 199 (2025)

In November 2024, Times Higher Education (THE) announced the Interdisciplinary Science Rankings 2025. In this first release, TDTU ranked 95th out of 749 ranked universities and 274 unranked universities (Reporter status).

In October 2023, THE World University Rankings ranked TDTU ranked 601-800 in THE's 2024 ranking period.

In May 2024, the Young University Rankings 2024 of the Times Higher Education (THE) announced that TDTU was ranked 179th out of 1,171 universities included in the rankings.

As per the results published on the QS World University Rankings 2026 by the Quacquarelli Symonds (QS) World University Rankings in June 2025, TDTU was ranked 684 out of 1,501 higher education institutions participating in the ranking.

In December 2023, the Quacquarelli Symonds Sustainability Rankings announced the ranking results of the sustainable universities in 2024. TDTU was ranked in the group of 881-900 universities with the most sustainable development in the world.

In April 2025, the Asia University Rankings 2025 of the Times Higher Education (THE) announced that TDTU was ranked 201-250 out of 1,213 higher education institutions in Asia.

In November 2023, TDTU was ranked 138th out of the 856 best universities in Asia in the 2024 ranking period by QS Asia University Rankings.

In December 2024, the ranking organization UI GreenMetric World University Ranking ranks TDTU 87th in the world out of 1,477 participating higher education institutions.

In December 2023, the University Ranking by Academic Performance (URAP) ranked TDTU at 501st in the world's best university rankings for the period 2023-2024.

In June 2024, US News ranked TDTU at 253 out of 2,459 universities ranked in the 2024-2025 ranking period.

In June 2025, as per the result published in the Impact Rankings 2025, TDTU was ranked in the group 401-600 in the world, among a total of 2,318 educational institutions participating in the ranking, in terms of influence on global sustainable development.

== Academic organization ==
Ton Duc Thang University is organized into units as follows:

=== Faculties - Campuses ===
- Accounting
- Applied Sciences
- Business Administration
- Civil Engineering
- Electrical & Electronics Eng
- Environment and Labour Safety
- Finance and Banking
- Foreign Languages
- Industrial Fine Arts
- Information Technology
- Labor Relations and Trade Unions
- Law
- Mathematics & Statistics
- Pharmacy Social Sciences & Humanities
- Sport Science
- Khanh Hoa Branch
- Bao Loc Campus
- Vietnam - Finland International School

=== Institute - Center ===
- International Cooperation, Research & Training Institute
- Institute for Advanced Study in Technology
- Institute for Business and Economics Policy
- Center for Applied Information Technology
- Center for Occupational Safety and Environmental Technology
- Center for Innovation and Technology Transfer
- Social Development Training Center
- Defense & Security Education Center
- Center of Enterprise Cooperation and Startup
- Center For Application Economic Research
- Creative Language Center
- Consultancy & Construction Verification Center
- Application and Development Industrial Art
- Center for Vietnamese Studies and Language
- Research and Academic Information Center
- Environmental Monitoring Assessment Center
- European Cooperation Center
- TDT Technology Services Company Limited
- Journal of Advanced Engineering and Computation
- Journal of Information and Telecommunication
- International Journal of Business and Sustainable Economics
- Foundation of Science and Technology Development

=== Department - Board ===
- Department of Student affairs
- Department of Undergraduate Studies
- Department of Graduate Studies
- Department for Computing & Computer services
- Department for Management of Science & Technology Development
- Department of Testing & Quality Assessment
- Department for Facility Management
- Department for Finance
- Department for Personnel & Administrative Affairs
- Department of Legal Affairs, Security and Internal Supervision
- Department of Planning - Project
- Dormitory Department for Communication & Public Relation
- Inspire Library
- President's Office Staff
- Office of the Party Committee and Trade Union

== Leaders of Ton Duc Thang University through periods ==
=== President of the University ===
- Chau Dieu Ai (1997 - 1998)
- Bui Ngoc Tho (1999 - 2006)
- Le Vinh Danh (2006 - 2020)
- Tran Trong Dao (2020–present) (Acting President, from November 16, 2022 as President of the University)

== Accreditations ==
In addition to the accreditation by Vietnam's Ministry of Education and Training, Ton Duc Thang University (TDTU) has been accredited by The High Council for Evaluation of Research and Higher Education (HCÉRES) who recognizes that Ton Duc Thang University (TDTU) complies with French and European standards for universities.

=== Institutional accreditation ===
- Certificate of Institutional Accreditation according to FIBAA Standards (2024 - 2030): On March 6, 2024, Ton Duc Thang University had the honor of being recognized and awarded the Quality Seal by the FIBAA Accreditation and Certificate Committee. The recognition period of this decision is six years, commencing from March 6, 2024, to March 5, 2030.
- HCÉRES accreditation (2018 - 2023): On July 2, 2018 The High Council for Evaluation of Research and Higher Education (HCÉRES) decided to recognize that Ton Duc Thang University (TDTU) complies with French and European standards for universities. This accreditation has been granted for a 5-year term, from July 2018 to July 2023.

=== Programme accreditation ===
- 15 programmes meeting the AUN-QA accreditation standards: In July 2019, TDTU had successfully evaluated 4 undergraduate programs according to AUN-QA standards. Four curricula certified by AUN-QA for the first time include Electronics and Telecommunications Engineering, Software Engineering, Environmental Science, and Finance-Banking. According to the certification results, these 4 curricula are rated “Adequate as Expected” or “Better than Adequate”. In March 2021, AUN-QA recognized 4 more undergraduate curricula of TDTU including Applied Mathematics, Accounting, Biotechnology, and English Language. The accreditation period is 5 years from March 1, 2021 to February 28, 2026. In November 2021, AUN-QA continued to recognize 3 undergraduate curricula including Architecture, Graphic Design, and Occupational Safety and Health. The accreditation period is 5 years from November 1, 2021 to October 31, 2026. In March 2023, AUN-QA recognized 4 undergraduate programmes in Pharmacy, Chemical Engineering, Interior Design, and Environmental Engineering Technology. According to the results, the recognition period is 5 years from January 22, 2023 to January 21, 2028.
- 11 study programmes meeting FIBAA's accreditation standards: In 2021, TDTU was awarded FIBAA quality seals for programme accreditation on four undergraduate programmes, including Labor Relations, Urban and Regional Planning, Sociology, and Vietnamese Studies - major in Tourism and Tourism Management. The accreditation period is five years, commencing from November 26, 2021 to November 25, 2026. In 2023, TDTU once again affirms the training quality by receiving the FIBAA quality seals for seven programmes, including the Master of Sociology, Master of Finance and Banking, Bachelor of Laws, Bachelor of Marketing, Bachelor of International Business, Bachelor of Business Administration - major in Hospitality, and Bachelor of Business Administration - major in Human Resource Management. This recognition is valid from September 20, 2023 to September 19, 2028 (five years).
- 09 study programmes accredited by ASIIN: In December 2023, the Agency for Accreditation and Quality Assurance in Higher Education (ASIIN, Germany) recognized and granted Ton Duc Thang University the ASIIN quality seals for 9 study programmes, including: 5 undergraduate programmes, namely: Computer Science, Construction Engineering, Transportation Engineering, Electrical Engineering, Automation and Control Engineering; 4 master programmes, namely: Computer Science, Construction Engineering, Electrical Engineering, Automation and Control Engineering.

=== Other certifications ===
- ISO 9001:2015 quality system certification: In June 2023, Ton Duc Thang University was granted the certificate of quality management system ISO 9001: 2015 by BSI organization (British Standards Institution). BSI is one of the world's leading certification bodies, founded in 1901, headquartered in London. BSI helps customers focus on performance, reduce risks and grow sustainably.
- “Environmentally friendly campus” certificate: On April 20th, 2016, the Vietnam Union of UNESCO Associations organized an award ceremony to present Ton Duc Thang University with an “Environmentally Friendly Campus” Certificate.

== International partnerships ==
- California State University Monterey Bay has a study abroad program at Ton Duc Thang University.
- The Fulbright Scholar Program includes Ton Duc Thang University as a partner.
- The university offers scholarships for students from Cambodia to study at the masters and doctoral levels. This program was started in 2016 and initially included 20 scholarships.
- Since 2015, Ton Duc Thang University and the International Labour Organization have had a partnership for information sharing and to provide opportunities for students from TDTU to participate in international internships.
- In 2016, Sales & Marketing Executives International, which is an international forum designed to promote collaboration and industry standards, announced a partnership with Ton Duc Thang University to allow students to gain access to additional professional experiences and certification.
- The Business & Hotel Management School in Lucerne, Switzerland signed a memorandum of understanding with Ton Duc Thang University in 2017 to allow students from TDTU to study at BHMS and gain working experience in Switzerland.
