= Châu Tuyết Vân =

Vietnamese Taekwondo athlete (born 1990)

- Vân in 2024

Personal information
- Nationality: Vietnam
- Born: Châu Tuyết Vân; 11 October 1990 (age 36) Ho Chi Minh City, Vietnam
- Education: Ton Duc Thang University
- Occupation: Athletes Taekwondo
- Years active: 2009–

Sport
- Sport: Taekwondo

Medal record

Professional Taekwondo athlete

Representing Vietnam

SEA Games
Silver medal – second place	2011 Indonesia	Women's team
Gold medal – first place	2013 Myanmar	Women's team
Gold medal – first place	2015 Singapore	Women's team
Gold medal – first place	2017 Malaysia	Women's team
Gold medal – first place	2019 Philippines	Women's team
Gold medal – first place	2022 Vietnam	Women's team
Gold medal – first place	2023 Cambodia	Women's team

Châu Tuyết Vân (born 11 October 1990) is a Vietnamese athlete and Taekwondo practitioner. She is a member of the Vietnamese Taekwondo national team, with a record of 6 consecutive gold medals at the SEA Games, 11 consecutive gold medals at the World Championships, 3 consecutive gold medals at the Asian Games, and 2 Gold Medal at the Southeast Asian Games in the synchronized poomsae event. She achieved the sixth-degree black belt certification in 2018 at the age of 28.

== Biography ==
Vân was born in 1990 and grew up in Ho Chi Minh City with her family. She started practicing Taekwondo at the age of 7. Due to her strong foundation, she was called up to the national team in 2009 to participate in the 25th SEA Games in Laos. In her debut appearance, she and her teammates won a bronze medal, marking her first international medal in her career.

== Career ==
=== 2013 ===
At the World Poomsae Taekwondo Championships in 2013, three Vietnamese girls, including Vân, won two gold medals in the team poomsae and creative poomsae events. Nguyễn Thị Lệ Kim, Nguyễn Thị Thu Ngân, and Vân were the first female athletes to win gold medals for Vietnam in Taekwondo at the 2013 Southeast Asian Games.

=== 2014 ===
In 2014, Vân, together with Nguyễn Thị Lệ Kim and Nguyen Thuy Xuan Linh, won the gold medal in the team poomsae event at the World Poomsae Taekwondo Championships. She also participated in the Youth Championship and the Southeast Asian Championship, winning two gold medals in the under-30 women's team event and the 5-member creative poomsae event.

=== 2015 ===
At the 2015 SEA Games in Singapore, Vân, Nguyễn Thị Lệ Kim, and Nguyen Thuy Xuan Linh won the gold medal in the women's team poomsae event.

=== 2016 ===
In 2016, at the World Poomsae Taekwondo Championships, Vietnam won a silver medal in the under-30 women's standard team event on the first day of competition, thanks to the contributions of Vân, Nguyễn Thị Lệ Kim, and Lien Thi Tuyet Mai. On the second day, Vietnam won two silver medals and one bronze medal. In the under-17 creative poomsae team event, Vân, Nguyễn Thị Lệ Kim, Hứa Văn Huy, Nguyen Thien Phung, and Le Thanh Trung won the silver medal.

=== 2017 ===
In August and September 2017, the Vietnamese Taekwondo poomsae team participated in three consecutive tournaments and achieved success in all of them. In the women's team poomsae event, Nguyễn Thị Lệ Kim, Vân, and Nguyen Thi Tuyet Mai won 3 gold medals at the 2017 SEA Games and the Asian Indoor and Martial Arts Games. At the 2017 SEA Games, Vân, Lien Thi Tuyet Mai, and Nguyễn Thị Lệ Kim successfully defended their gold medal in the women's team poomsae event.

=== 2019 ===
Hứa Văn Huy and Vân won silver medals at the 2019 Chungju World Martial Arts Masterships

Vân, competed along with Tran Ho Duy, Nguyễn Thị Lệ Kim, Hứa Văn Huy, Nguyen Ngoc Minh Hy in the category of Taekwondo, Synchronized Creative Poomsae. They won a gold medal at the 2019 SEA Games.

=== 2022 ===
They participated in a performance with five athletes (3 males: Hứa Văn Huy, Nguyen Ngoc Minh Hy, and Tran Dang Khoa; 2 females: Châu Tuyết Vân, Nguyễn Thị Lệ Kim). With high-level techniques such as spinning kicks and aerial moves, they scored 7.799 points. They won a gold medal at the 2021 SEA Games.

=== 2023 ===
Vân, Hứa Văn Huy, Le Ngoc Han, Nguyen Thi Y Binh, and Tran Dang Khoa competed in the mixed gender creative poomsae event at the 2023 US Open Taekwondo Championship and won a gold medal. Châu Tuyết Vân also won a gold medal in the individual poomsae event for women.

On 12 May 2023, in the finals of the synchronized creative poomsae event, Nguyen Ngoc Minh Hy, Nguyen Thi Mong Quynh, Hứa Văn Huy, Vân, and Tran Dang Khoa won a gold medal at the 32nd SEA Games.

=== 2024 ===
On 15 May 2024, Vân, Liên Thị Tuyết Mai, and Nguyễn Thị Lệ Kim won the gold medal in the women's team T30 standard poomsae event at the 2024 Asian Taekwondo Poomsae Championships.

Vân, Nguyễn Thị Lệ Kim, and Liên Thị Tuyết Mai won the gold medal in the women's team standard poomsae event in the senior division at the 2024 World Taekwondo Poomsae Championships, held in Hong Kong.

On the afternoon of 3 December 2024, Vân won her second gold medal at the 2024 World Taekwondo Poomsae Championships in Hong Kong.

On 20 September 2024, Châu Tuyết Vân takes part in a reality show Chị đẹp đạp gió rẽ sóng.

=== 2026 ===
On 6 March 2026, Vân won the gold medal in the Women’s Under-40 Individual Recognized Poomsae event at the 2026 U.S. Open, held in Las Vegas. She also earned a bronze medal in the Over-17 Mixed Pair Freestyle Poomsae event.

Vân won the silver medal in the women's U40 individual standard poomsae event at the Asian Taekwondo Championships.

In the morning of 20 May 2026, in the women's U40 standard team poomsae event at the 2026 Asian Taekwondo Championships (19–26 May), Vân, Nguyễn Thị Lệ Kim, and Liên Thị Tuyết Mai won the gold medal for the Vietnamese team.

Vân and her teammates won the silver medal at the 2026 World Taekwondo Demonstration and Breaking Championships.

On the afternoon of 17 September 2026, Vân won the silver medal in the women's individual standard U40 at the 2026 World Taekwondo Poomsae Championships, held in Chuncheon, South Korea.

On the afternoon of 19 September 2026, Vân, Nguyễn Thị Lệ Kim, and Liên Thị Tuyết Mai won the gold medal in the women's U50 team standard poomsae event at the 2026 World Taekwondo Poomsae Championships, held in Chuncheon, South Korea.

== Achievements ==
Sporting achievements of Châu Tuyết Vân
Year	Competition	Venue	Achievement	Source
2010	World Taekwondo Poomsae Championships	Tashkent	Gold medal	
2011	World Taekwondo Poomsae Championships	Russia	2 Gold medals	
2011	2011 SEA Games	Indonesia	Silver medal	
2012	Asian Taekwondo Championships	South Korea	Gold medal	
2012	World Military Taekwondo Championships	Vietnam	Gold medal	
2012	Asian University Taekwondo Championships	Vietnam	2 Gold medals	
2013	World Taekwondo Poomsae Championships	Indonesia	2 Gold medals	
2013	2013 SEA Games	Myanmar	Gold medal	
2014	World Taekwondo Poomsae Championships	Vietnam	Gold medal	
2015	2015 SEA Games	Singapore	Gold medal	
2017	2017 SEA Games	Malaysia	Gold medal	
2017	2017 Asian Indoor and Martial Arts Games	Japan	Gold medal	
2019	2019 SEA Games	Philippines	Gold medal	
2019	2019 Chungju World Martial Arts Masterships	South Korea	Silver medal	
2021	National Taekwondo Club Championships	Vietnam	2 Gold medals	
2022	2021 SEA Games	Vietnam	Gold medal	
2023	U.S. Open Taekwondo Championships	United States	2 Gold medals	
2023	2023 SEA Games	Cambodia	Gold medal	
2024	Asian Taekwondo Championships	Vietnam	Gold medal	
2024	World Taekwondo Poomsae Championships	Hong Kong	2 Gold medals	
2026	U.S. Open Taekwondo Championships	United States	Gold medal	
2026	U.S. Open Taekwondo Championships	United States	Bronze medal	
2026	Asian Taekwondo Championships	Mongolia	Gold medal	
2026	Asian Taekwondo Championships	Mongolia	Silver medal	
2026	2026 World Taekwondo Demonstration and Breaking Championships	Chuncheon	Silver medal	
2026	2026 World Taekwondo Poomsae Championships	Chuncheon	Silver medal	
2026	2026 World Taekwondo Poomsae Championships	Chuncheon	Gold medal	

== Honours ==
- Prime Minister's Certificate of Merit (in 2013, 2014, 2015, and 2017)
- Labour Order Third Class (2008)
- Certificate of Merit from the Ministry of Culture and Sports and Certificate of Merit from the People's Committee of Ho Chi Minh City.
- Outstanding Young Citizen of Ho Chi Minh City in 2013.
- Labour Order Third Class (2023)
- Labour Order First Class (2025)

== Family ==
Her two younger sisters are Châu Ngọc Giàu, who initially also practiced Taekwondo but did not pursue it throughout her career and now works as an office staff member at the Ho Chi Minh City Taekwondo Federation, where she is responsible for photography and media coverage of the teams' training and competitions. Her youngest sister, Châu Ngọc Tuyết Sang, born in 2005, holds a third-degree black belt and is considered a potential successor to her sister's title as the "hot girl of the martial arts world".

== Candidacy for the Ho Chi Minh City People's Council ==
Taekwondo athlete Vân ran for election to the Ho Chi Minh City People's Council for the 2021–2026 term.

== University lecturer ==
According to Hoa Sen University, Vân signed a teaching contract with the university and serves as a lecturer responsible for teaching Taekwondo.
