= Nguyễn Ngọc Minh Hy =

Vietnamese Taekwondo

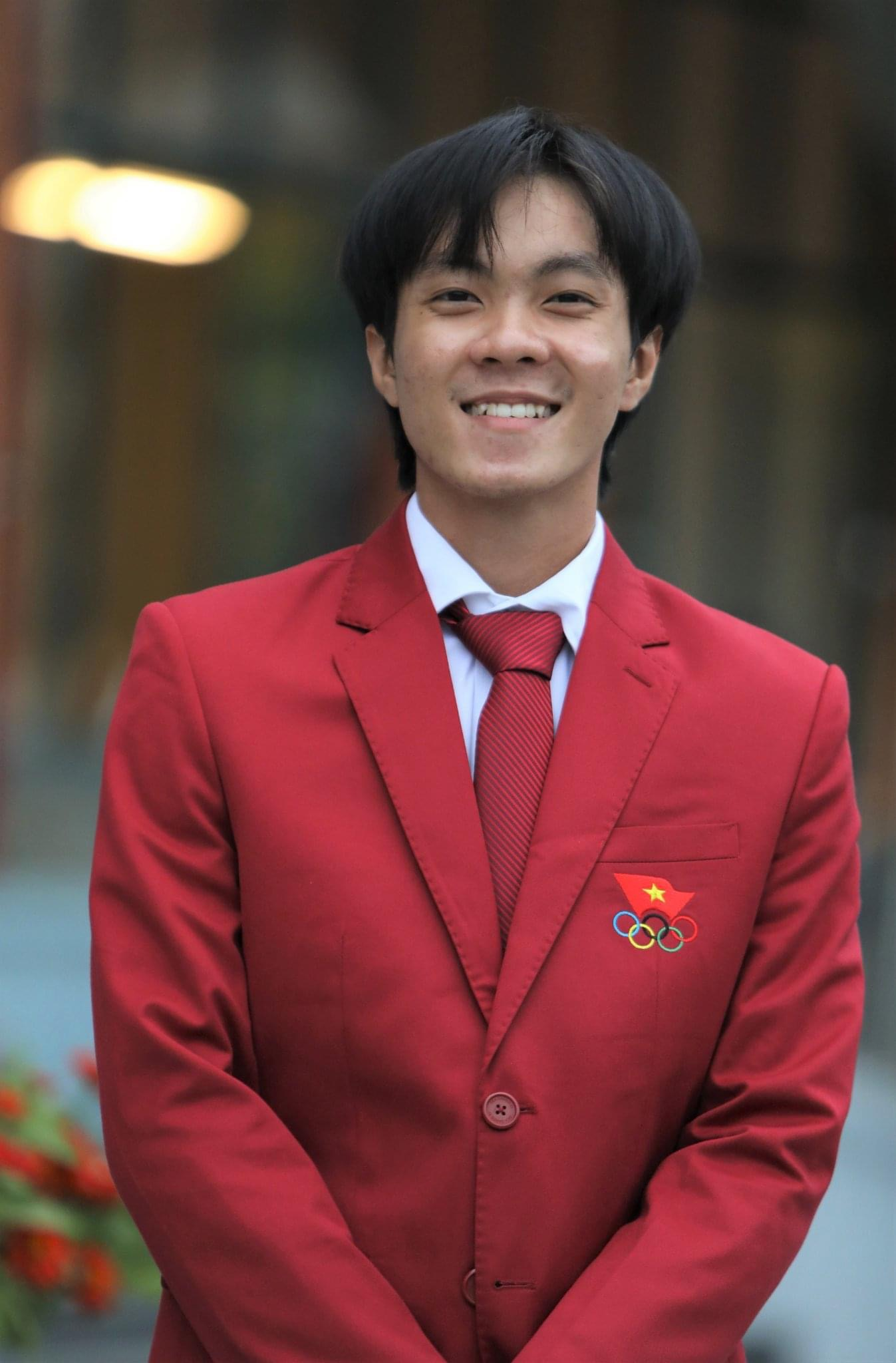
- Nguyễn Ngọc Minh Hy

Personal information
- Nationality: Vietnam
- Born: Nguyễn Ngọc Minh Hy; 1 August 2001 (age 25) Ho Chi Minh City, Vietnam
- Education: Ton Duc Thang University
- Occupation: Athletes Taekwondo

Sport
- Sport: Taekwondo

Medal record

Professional Taekwondo athlete

Representing Vietnam

SEA Games
Gold medal – first place	2019 Philippines	Men's team poomsae
Gold medal – first place	2021 Vietnam	Men's team poomsae}
Gold medal – first place	2023 Cambodia	Team freestyle poomsae

Nguyễn Ngọc Minh Hy (born 1 August 2001) is a Vietnamese Taekwondo athlete. He is a member of the Vietnam Taekwondo national team.

== Biography ==
Nguyễn Ngọc Minh Hy began practicing Taekwondo at the age of seven.

== Career ==
=== 2019 ===
Trần Hồ Duy, Châu Tuyết Vân, Nguyễn Thị Lệ Kim, Hứa Văn Huy, and Nguyễn Ngọc Minh Hy won the gold medal in the mixed team creative poomsae event in Taekwondo at the 2019 Southeast Asian Games.

Nguyễn Ngọc Minh Hy won the silver medal in the men's individual creative poomsae event at the 2019 Southeast Asian Games.

=== 2021 ===
Five athletes—three men, Hứa Văn Huy, Nguyễn Ngọc Minh Hy, and Trần Đăng Khoa, and two women, Châu Tuyết Vân and Nguyễn Thị Lệ Kim—won the gold medal at the 2021 Southeast Asian Games with a score of 7.799 points, performing a poomsae routine featuring highly technical movements such as spinning kicks and aerial techniques.

=== 2023 ===
On 12 May 2023, Nguyễn Ngọc Minh Hy, Nguyễn Thị Mộng Quỳnh, Hứa Văn Huy, Châu Tuyết Vân, and Trần Đăng Khoa won the gold medal in the team creative poomsae final at the SEA Games 32.

=== 2024 ===
A six-member team consisting of Nguyễn Thị Y Bình, Trần Phương Nhung, Nguyễn Thanh Hiền Linh, Nguyễn Ngọc Minh Hy, Trần Đăng Khoa, and Hồ Thanh Ân won the gold medal in the Over-17 Creative Team category with a score of 8.680 points at the 2024 World Taekwondo Poomsae Championships.

== Notable achievements ==
=== Sport ===
Year	Competition	Venue	Achievement	Source
2019	2019 Southeast Asian Games	Philippines	Gold medal	
2019	2019 Southeast Asian Games	Philippines	Silver medal	
2021	2021 Southeast Asian Games	Vietnam	Gold medal	
2023	SEA Games 32	Cambodia	Gold medal	

=== Honors ===
- Labour Order First Class (2025)
