= World Junior Taekwondo Championships =

Taekwondo competition

World Taekwondo Junior Championships
- Current event or competition: 2026 World Taekwondo Junior Championships

Competition details
- Discipline: Taekwondo
- Type: Kyorugi, biennial
- Organiser: World Taekwondo (WT)

History
- First edition: 1996 in Barcelona, Spain
- Editions: 15 (2026)
- Most wins: 178 medals South Korea

The World Taekwondo Junior Championships is a worldwide biennial championship organized for juniors age category by World Taekwondo, first held in 1996 in Barcelona. The event is contested every two years.

== Editions ==
Edition	Year	Date	Host city and country	Men's champion	Women's champion
1	1996	27-30 June	Barcelona, Spain	South Korea	South Korea
2	1998	9-13 September	Istanbul, Turkey	South Korea	South Korea
3	2000	15-18 November	(Republic of Ireland) Killarney, Ireland	South Korea	South Korea
4	2002	1-6 October	Heraklion, Greece	South Korea	South Korea
5	2004	12-18 June	Suncheon, South Korea	South Korea	South Korea
6	2006	26-30 July	Ho Chi Minh City, Vietnam	South Korea	South Korea
7	2008	8-11 May	İzmir, Turkey	South Korea	South Korea
8	2010	6-9 March	Tijuana, Mexico	Iran	South Korea
9	2012	4-8 April	Sharm El-Sheikh, Egypt	South Korea	South Korea
10	2014	23-26 March	Taipei, Taiwan	South Korea	South Korea
11	2016	16-20 November	Burnaby, Canada	South Korea	Iran
12	2018	9-13 April	Hammamet, Tunisia	Iran	Russia
13	2022	2–7 August	Sofia, Bulgaria	South Korea	South Korea
14	2024	1–6 October	Chuncheon, South Korea	Iran	Iran
15	2026	12–17 April	Tashkent, Uzbekistan	Uzbekistan	China

== Medal table ==
All results from 1996 to 2026
Rank	Nation	Gold	Silver	Bronze	Total
1	South Korea	114	32	32	178
2	Iran	41	16	24	81
3	China	14	12	20	46
4	Chinese Taipei	12	22	29	63
5	Russia	12	20	38	70
6	Turkey	11	23	42	76
7	United States	10	11	25	46
8	Spain	7	11	30	48
9	Great Britain	7	4	12	23
10	Vietnam	6	0	6	12
11	Thailand	5	16	17	38
12	Croatia	5	9	25	39
13	Mexico	5	8	23	36
14	Italy	5	4	19	28
15	Greece	4	9	20	33
16	France	4	7	16	27
17	Uzbekistan	4	7	8	19
18	Azerbaijan	4	5	9	18
19	Jordan	3	8	9	20
20	Serbia	3	4	7	14
21	Kazakhstan	2	8	14	24
22	Brazil	2	2	8	12
23	Canada	2	1	21	24
24	Philippines	2	1	8	11
25	Tunisia	2	1	5	8
26	Germany	1	14	18	33
27	Ukraine	1	2	13	16
28	Morocco	1	1	4	6
29	Dominican Republic	1	1	0	2
29	Puerto Rico	1	1	0	2
29	Slovenia	1	1	0	2
32	Belgium	1	0	9	10
33	Denmark	1	0	1	2
34	Indonesia	1	0	0	1
35	Poland	0	6	6	12
36	Netherlands	0	6	4	10
37	Australia	0	3	7	10
38	Sweden	0	3	5	8
39	Egypt	0	2	4	6
40	Costa Rica	0	2	0	2
41	Israel	0	1	3	4
42	Argentina	0	1	2	3
42	Lesotho	0	1	2	3
44	Bulgaria	0	1	1	2
44	Cuba	0	1	1	2
44	Czech Republic	0	1	1	2
44	Moldova	0	1	1	2
44	Portugal	0	1	1	2
49	Bahamas	0	1	0	1
49	French Polynesia	0	1	0	1
49	Montenegro	0	1	0	1
49	Oman	0	1	0	1
53	Cyprus	0	0	3	3
53	Guatemala	0	0	3	3
53	India	0	0	3	3
53	Japan	0	0	3	3
57	Afghanistan	0	0	2	2
57	Ireland	0	0	2	2
57	Lebanon	0	0	2	2
57	Malaysia	0	0	2	2
57	Niger	0	0	2	2
57	Norway	0	0	2	2
57	Qatar	0	0	2	2
57	Slovakia	0	0	2	2
65	Belgium	0	0	1	1
65	Bosnia and Herzegovina	0	0	1	1
65	Chile	0	0	1	1
65	Colombia	0	0	1	1
65	Ivory Coast	0	0	1	1
65	Kuwait	0	0	1	1
65	Macau	0	0	1	1
65	Palestine	0	0	1	1
65	Romania	0	0	1	1
65	Saudi Arabia	0	0	1	1
Totals (74 entries)		295	295	588	1,178

== See also ==
- World Taekwondo Championships
- World Cup Taekwondo Team Championships
- 2025 World U21 Taekwondo Championships
- World Cadet Taekwondo Championships
- European Junior Taekwondo Championships
- Asian Junior Taekwondo Championships
- Ocean Junior Taekwondo Championships
- African Junior Taekwondo Championships
- Pan American Junior Taekwondo Championships
