= 2022 World Taekwondo Championships – Women's lightweight =

Taekwondo competitions

Women's lightweight at the 2022 World Championships
- Venue: Centro Acuático CODE Metropolitano
- Dates: 15 November 2022
- Competitors: 47 from 47 nations

Medalists
gold medal	Sarah Chaâri	Belgium
silver medal	Theopoula Sarvanaki	Greece
bronze medal	Aaliyah Powell	Great Britain
bronze medal	Feruza Sadikova	Uzbekistan

The women's lightweight is a competition featured at the 2022 World Taekwondo Championships, and was held at the Acuático Code Metropolitano in Guadalajara, Mexico on 15 November 2022. Lightweights were limited to a maximum of 62 kilograms in body mass.

== Results ==
Legend

- DQ — Won by disqualification
- P — Won by punitive declaration

=== Finals ===
Semifinals				Final
Sarah Chaâri (BEL)	4	1	12
Aaliyah Powell (GBR)	0	5	6	Sarah Chaâri (BEL)	1	3	12
Theopoula Sarvanaki (GRE)	11^{P}	7		Theopoula Sarvanaki (GRE)	3	2	7
Feruza Sadikova (UZB)	7	1

=== Top half ===
==== Section 1 ====
Round of 64
~~Milka Alango (KEN)~~
Carolena Carstens (PAN)	D	Q
Chang Jui-en (TPE)	4	6
Gerda Gaižauskaitė (LTU)	2	0
Faith Dillon (USA)	D	Q
~~Kadidja Koutoubali (CHA)~~

Round of 32
Caroline Santos (BRA)	6	9
Carolena Carstens (PAN)	4	2
Mell Mina (ECU)	0	2
Zhou Lijun (CHN)	4	11
Anna-Lena Frömming (GER)	1	2
Chang Jui-en (TPE)	0	1
Faith Dillon (USA)	0	3
Sarah Chaâri (BEL)	6	12

Round of 16
Caroline Santos (BRA)	14	3	3
Zhou Lijun (CHN)	2	7	12
Anna-Lena Frömming (GER)	0	2
Sarah Chaâri (BEL)	3	2

Quarterfinals
Zhou Lijun (CHN)	4	0
Sarah Chaâri (BEL)	10	12

==== Section 2 ====
Round of 64
Aaliyah Powell (GBR)	D	Q
~~Mariia Labuzova (UKR)~~
Yacine Diaw (SEN)	D	Q
~~Kadiatou Sow (GUI)~~
Sheylee López (HON)	3	2
İkra Kayır (TUR)	13	13
Zhadyra Khairullina (KAZ)	4	1
Cristina Gaspa (ITA)	10	4

Round of 32
Jone Magdaleno (ESP)	1	0
Aaliyah Powell (GBR)	12	6
Yacine Diaw (SEN)	0	0
Nađa Savković (SRB)	4	5
Safia Salih (MAR)	9	2
İkra Kayır (TUR)	13	8
Cristina Gaspa (ITA)	5	0
Itzel Velázquez (MEX)	5	1

Round of 16
Aaliyah Powell (GBR)	8	3
Nađa Savković (SRB)	3	0
İkra Kayır (TUR)	8	3	0
Itzel Velázquez (MEX)	4	4	3

Quarterfinals
Aaliyah Powell (GBR)	5	11
Itzel Velázquez (MEX)	1	4

=== Bottom half ===
==== Section 3 ====
Round of 64
Tindra Andersson (SWE)	D	Q
~~Alexmar Sulbarán (VEN)~~
Koumba Ibo (CIV)	5	3
Kasumi Hirabayashi (JPN)	2	0
Alphonsine Edayong (GAB)	0	0
Sasikarn Tongchan (THA)	12	7
Cathy Ho (HKG)	7	0
Helmi Härkönen (FIN)	20	12

Round of 32
Bruna Vuletić (CRO)	1	6
Tindra Andersson (SWE)	0	0
Koumba Ibo (CIV)	1	1
Theopoula Sarvanaki (GRE)	1	8
Miljana Reljiḱ (MKD)	6	5
Sasikarn Tongchan (THA)	2	4
Helmi Härkönen (FIN)	0	0
Petra Štolbová (CZE)	9	13

Round of 16
Bruna Vuletić (CRO)	0	4	0
Theopoula Sarvanaki (GRE)	0	3	1
Miljana Reljiḱ (MKD)	0	0
Petra Štolbová (CZE)	3	9

Quarterfinals
Theopoula Sarvanaki (GRE)	7	9
Petra Štolbová (CZE)	2	8

==== Section 4 ====
Round of 64
Anastasia Galazoula (AUS)	D	Q
~~Madinatou Moussa (NIG)~~
~~Cassie Tubbs (CAM)~~
Arlettys Acosta (CUB)	D	Q
Alicia Valdez (PAR)	1	0
Karoline Gjelsvik (NOR)	8	14
Kwak Min-ju (KOR)	12	13
Anushiya Priyadarshini (IND)	0	0

Round of 32
Feruza Sadikova (UZB)	9	5
Anastasia Galazoula (AUS)	2	4
Arlettys Acosta (CUB)	0	0
Jolanta Tarvida (LAT)	0	0
Narges Mirnourollahi (IRI)	0	3	11
Karoline Gjelsvik (NOR)	0	6	4
Kwak Min-ju (KOR)	0	1	1
Ashley Kraayeveld (CAN)	0	1	3

Round of 16
Feruza Sadikova (UZB)	3	4
Arlettys Acosta (CUB)	0	1
Narges Mirnourollahi (IRI)	1	12	1
Ashley Kraayeveld (CAN)	2	3	5

Quarterfinals
Feruza Sadikova (UZB)	3	6
Ashley Kraayeveld (CAN)	0	1
