= 2025 World Taekwondo Championships – Women's lightweight =

Taekwondo competitions

Women's lightweight at the 2025 World Championships
- Venue: Taihu International Expo Center
- Dates: 29 October 2025
- Competitors: 47 from 45 nations

Medalists
gold medal	Wafa Masghouni	Tunisia
silver medal	Viviana Márton	Hungary
bronze medal	Chen Ximin	China
bronze medal	Gabriella Blewitt	Australia

The Women's lightweight competition at the 2025 World Taekwondo Championships was held on 29 October 2025 in Wuxi, China. Lightweights were limited to a maximum of 62 kilograms in body mass.

== Results ==
=== Finals ===
Semifinals			Final
Viviana Márton (HUN)	2	11
Chen Ximin (CHN)	2	5	Viviana Márton (HUN)	7	0
Wafa Masghouni (TUN)	17	12	Wafa Masghouni (TUN)	7	0
Gabriella Blewitt (AUS)	5	2

=== Top half ===
==== Section 1 ====
Round of 64
Merica Chan (PHI)	3	0
Maísa Monteiro (POR)	4	8
Oumoulker Amadou (NIG)	4	1	3
Kawehi Iorss (FPO)	0	11	5
Karoline Gjelsvik (NOR)	5	5
Carla Demian (LBN)	4	2

Round of 32
Viviana Márton (HUN)	13	11
Maísa Monteiro (POR)	1	0
Andrea Komatina (MNE)	0	0
Nađa Savković (SRB)	9	4
Ella Brewster (CAN)	4	6	7
Kawehi Iorss (FPO)	4	2	4
Karoline Gjelsvik (NOR)	0	2
Liliia Khuzina (AIN)	5	6

Round of 16
Viviana Márton (HUN)	6	1
Nađa Savković (SRB)	0	0
Ella Brewster (CAN)	4	5
Liliia Khuzina (AIN)	6	7

Quarterfinals
Viviana Márton (HUN)	8	2
Liliia Khuzina (AIN)	2	0

==== Section 2 ====
Round of 64
Nouria Djé (CIV)	0	2
Lee Ga-eun (KOR)	11	6
Razan Al-Rawashdeh (JOR)	13	9
Yade Bongsomenggolo (SUR)	0	0
Nancy Essoughe (GAB)	4	7
Celydiene Carneiro (BRA)	8	12
Kosar Asaseh (IRI)	12	8
Antreana Achilleos (CYP)	0	2

Round of 32
Dora Meštrović (CRO)	8	10
Lee Ga-eun (KOR)	6	7
Razan Al-Rawashdeh (JOR)	4	4	8
Arlet Ortiz (ESP)	4	4	7
Miljana Reljiḱ (MKD)	6	6
Celydiene Carneiro (BRA)	4	5
Kosar Asaseh (IRI)	0	7	5
Chen Ximin (CHN)	2	5	5

Round of 16
Dora Meštrović (CRO)	9	16
Razan Al-Rawashdeh (JOR)	5	4
Miljana Reljiḱ (MKD)	0	3
Chen Ximin (CHN)	0	4

Quarterfinals
Dora Meštrović (CRO)	5	0
Chen Ximin (CHN)	11	4

=== Bottom half ===
==== Section 3 ====
Round of 64
Camila Cáceres (PER)	11	1
Isabella Lovaglio (MEX)	13	4
Danica Deaton (USA)	12	15
Teiti Teakaua (KIR)	0	1
Phạm Ngọc Châm (VIE)	0	4	0
Sevinch Khayitova (UZB)	3	4	7
Fatima-Zahra Ennams (MAR)	13	16
Yacine Diaw (SEN)	7	16

Round of 32
Petra Štolbová (CZE)	4	4
Isabella Lovaglio (MEX)	1	3
Danica Deaton (USA)	4	0
Julia Szpak (POL)	6	2
Wafa Masghouni (TUN)	6	3	3
Sevinch Khayitova (UZB)	1	7	2
Fatima-Zahra Ennams (MAR)	2	7
Sasikarn Tongchan (THA)	10	11

Round of 16
Petra Štolbová (CZE)	2	2
Julia Szpak (POL)	8	6
Wafa Masghouni (TUN)	0	4	5
Sasikarn Tongchan (THA)	8	2	1

Quarterfinals
Julia Szpak (POL)	1	4
Wafa Masghouni (TUN)	3	11

==== Section 4 ====
Round of 64
Sonam Rawal (IND)	0	0
Theopoula Sarvanaki (GRE)	9	13
Isuangelis Soto (PUR)	6	5
Amna Al-Loghani (UAE)	2	0
Mayerlin Mejía (DOM)	4	7	1
Aisha Adilbekkyzy (KAZ)	4	14	0
Valeryia Smychkova (AIN)	4	12
Cathy Ho (HKG)	0	2

Round of 32
Şevval Çakal (TUR)	4	3
Theopoula Sarvanaki (GRE)	3	2
Isuangelis Soto (PUR)	0	10	12
Gabriella Blewitt (AUS)	13	7	15
Chang Jui-en (TPE)	7	15
Mayerlin Mejía (DOM)	0	3
Valeryia Smychkova (AIN)	0	5
Mell Mina (ECU)	4	7

Round of 16
Şevval Çakal (TUR)	7	4	1
Gabriella Blewitt (AUS)	3	5	3
Chang Jui-en (TPE)	0	5
Mell Mina (ECU)	2	9

Quarterfinals
Gabriella Blewitt (AUS)	2	7	10
Mell Mina (ECU)	2	3	8
