= 2019 World Taekwondo Championships – Women's lightweight =

Women's lightweight at the 2019 World Championships
- Venue: Manchester Arena
- Dates: 19 May 2019
- Competitors: 41 from 41 nations

Medalists
gold medal	İrem Yaman	Turkey
silver medal	Caroline Santos	Brazil
bronze medal	Magda Wiet-Hénin	France
bronze medal	Bruna Vuletić	Croatia

The women's lightweight is a competition featured at the 2019 World Taekwondo Championships, and was held at the Manchester Arena in Manchester, United Kingdom on 19 May. Lightweights were limited to a maximum of 62 kilograms in body mass.

== Results ==
=== Finals ===
Semifinals		Final
İrem Yaman (TUR)	11
Magda Wiet-Hénin (FRA)	7	İrem Yaman (TUR)	21
Caroline Santos (BRA)	14	Caroline Santos (BRA)	7
Bruna Vuletić (CRO)	11

=== Top half ===
==== Section 1 ====
Round of 64
Fatima Zhaksybayeva (KAZ)	1
Amani Layouni (TUN)	13
Luo Zongshi (CHN)	11
Anamarija Georgievska (MKD)	0
Anna-Lena Frömming (GER)	8
Safia Salih (MAR)	3

Round of 32
İrem Yaman (TUR)	9
Amani Layouni (TUN)	1
Feruza Sadikova (UZB)	18
Natali Hamaidi (JOR)	3
Laura Roebben (BEL)	12
Luo Zongshi (CHN)	15
Anna-Lena Frömming (GER)	5
Ara White (USA)	5

Round of 16
İrem Yaman (TUR)	28
Feruza Sadikova (UZB)	9
Luo Zongshi (CHN)	16
Anna-Lena Frömming (GER)	7

Quarterfinals
İrem Yaman (TUR)	3
Luo Zongshi (CHN)	2

==== Section 2 ====
Round of 64
Tsang Wai Ying (HKG)	5
Sarah Tanios (LBN)	3
María Álvarez (COL)	21
Rosa Hower (PUR)	7

Round of 32
Ashley Kraayeveld (CAN)	10
Tsang Wai Ying (HKG)	3
Kim Da-yeong (KOR)	8
Anel Félix (MEX)	9
Ioanna Desylla (GRE)	6
Hedaya Malak (EGY)	14
María Álvarez (COL)	10
Magda Wiet-Hénin (FRA)	15

Round of 16
Ashley Kraayeveld (CAN)	18
Anel Félix (MEX)	17
Hedaya Malak (EGY)	6
Magda Wiet-Hénin (FRA)	15

Quarterfinals
Ashley Kraayeveld (CAN)	5
Magda Wiet-Hénin (FRA)	25

=== Bottom half ===
==== Section 3 ====
Round of 64
Assunta Cennamo (ITA)	24
Tayla Nolte (AUS)	15
Bắc Thị Khiêm (VIE)	2
Teodora Mitrović (MNE)	6

Round of 32
Marta Calvo (ESP)	7
Assunta Cennamo (ITA)	6
Urgence Mouega (GAB)	12
Chang Li-chien (TPE)	13
Caroline Santos (BRA)	39
Yalda Valinejad (IRI)	19
Teodora Mitrović (MNE)	19
Darya Yakovleva (UKR)	13

Round of 16
Marta Calvo (ESP)	8
Chang Li-chien (TPE)	4
Caroline Santos (BRA)	27
Teodora Mitrović (MNE)	2

Quarterfinals
Marta Calvo (ESP)	5
Caroline Santos (BRA)	25

==== Section 4 ====
Round of 64
Sofia Cruz (POR)	10
Claudia Gallardo (CHI)	13
Yulia Zaitseva (RUS)	24
Erato Athanasiou (CYP)	5

Round of 32
Ana Ciuchitu (MDA)	5
Claudia Gallardo (CHI)	2
Jasmin Manninen (FIN)	1
Bruna Vuletić (CRO)	16
Dunja Lemajić (SLO)	2
Petra Štolbová (CZE)	8
Yulia Zaitseva (RUS)	17
Nadica Božanić (SRB)	15

Round of 16
Ana Ciuchitu (MDA)	4
Bruna Vuletić (CRO)	12
Petra Štolbová (CZE)	2
Yulia Zaitseva (RUS)	22

Quarterfinals
Bruna Vuletić (CRO)	13
Yulia Zaitseva (RUS)	12
