= Elsa Secanell =

Spanish taekwondo practitioner

Elsa Secanell Charles
Personal information
- Born: 21 July 2006 (age 20)

Sport
- Country: Spain
- Sport: Taekwondo
Medal record
Women's taekwondo
Representing Spain
European Championships
Silver medal – second place	2026 Munich	62 kg
World U21 Championships
Silver medal – second place	2025 Nairobi	62 kg
European U21 Championships
Gold medal – first place	2025 Pristina	62 kg

Elsa Secanell Charles (born 21 July 2006) is a Spanish taekwondo practitioner. She was a silver medalist at the 2026 European Taekwondo Championships.

== Career ==
From Sant Sadurní d'Anoia in Catalonia, she trains as a member of TKD Sansa gym. Secanell won the Spanish Taekwondo Championships held in Alicante, in the -62 kg category.

In December 2025, she was a silver medalist at the 2025 World U21 Taekwondo Championships in Nairobi, Kenya, recording wins over Gabriella Blewitt of Australia in the quarter final and Ella Brewster of Canada in the semi-final before facing eventual gold medalist Wafa Masghouni of Tunisia in the final. Later that month, she won the gold medal in the women’s -62 kg at the 2025 European U21 Taekwondo Championships in Pristina, Kosovo.

In May 2026, she was a silver medalist at the 2026 European Taekwondo Championships in Munich, Germany, having beaten the second seed, Dora Mestrovic of Croatia, and the third seed, the double European medallist Petra Štolbová of the Czech Republic before facing Hungarian Olympic champion Viviana Marton in the final.
