= 2024 European Taekwondo Championships – Women's 62 kg =

Women's 62 kg at the 2024 European Taekwondo Championships
- Venue: Belgrade Fair – Hall 1
- Location: Belgrade, Serbia
- Dates: 12 May
- Competitors: 26 from 26 nations

Medalists
gold medal	Kimia Alizadeh	Bulgaria
silver medal	Aaliyah Powell	Great Britain
bronze medal	Ivana Arelić	Croatia
bronze medal	Petra Štolbová	Czech Republic

The women's 62 kg competition at the 2024 European Taekwondo Championships was held on 12 May 2024.

== Results ==
=== Finals ===
Semifinals
Kimia Alizadeh (BUL)	2
Ivana Arelić (CRO)	0
Aaliyah Powell (GBR)	2
Petra Štolbová (CZE)	0

Final
Kimia Alizadeh (BUL)	2
Aaliyah Powell (GBR)	1

=== Top half ===
==== Section 1 ====
Round of 32
Antreana Achilleos (CYP)	0
Zoé Gueli (HUN)	2
Kimia Alizadeh (BUL)	2
Lyhana Langouste-Assoumaya (FRA)	0
Luna De Matteo (ITA)	2
Karoline Gjelsvik (NOR)	1

Round of 16
Nađa Tešić (SRB)	2
Zoé Gueli (HUN)	0
Kimia Alizadeh (BUL)	2
Luna De Matteo (ITA)	0

Quarterfinals
Nađa Tešić (SRB)	0
Kimia Alizadeh (BUL)	2

==== Section 2 ====
Round of 32
Valeryia Smychkova (AIN)	2
Helmi Härkönen (FIN)	0
Mariia Labuzova (UKR)	0
Hatice Pınar Yiğitalp (TUR)	2

Round of 16
Ivana Arelić (CRO)	2
Valeryia Smychkova (AIN)	0
Hatice Pınar Yiğitalp (TUR)	1
Miljana Reljiḱ (MKD)	2

Quarterfinals
Ivana Arelić (CRO)	2
Miljana Reljiḱ (MKD)	0

=== Bottom half ===
==== Section 3 ====
Round of 32
Viktorya Kuchina (AIN)	2
Maisa Monteiro (POR)	0
Tindra Andersson (SWE)	2
Meline Hovhannisyan (ARM)	0

Round of 16
Jone Magdaleno (ESP)	1
Viktorya Kuchina (AIN)	2
Tindra Andersson (SWE)	0
Aaliyah Powell (GBR)	2

Quarterfinals
Viktorya Kuchina (AIN)	1
Aaliyah Powell (GBR)	2

==== Section 4 ====
Round of 32
Theopoula Sarvanaki (GRE)	2
Andrea Berišaj (MNE)	0
Marija Orlović (BIH)	1
Julia Szpak (POL)	2
Carmen Raagmets (EST)	0
Inese Tarvida (LAT)	2

Round of 16
Theopoula Sarvanaki (GRE)	2
Julia Szpak (POL)	0
Inese Tarvida (LAT)	0
Petra Štolbová (CZE)	2

Quarterfinals
Theopoula Sarvanaki (GRE)	0
Petra Štolbová (CZE)	2
