= 2023 World Taekwondo Championships – Women's lightweight =

Taekwondo competitions

Women's lightweight at the 2023 World Championships
- Venue: Baku Crystal Hall
- Dates: 3 June 2023
- Competitors: 54 from 52 nations

Medalists
| gold medal | Liliia Khuzina | Individual Neutral Athletes |
| silver medal | Caroline Santos | Brazil |
| bronze medal | Aaliyah Powell | Great Britain |
| bronze medal | Feruza Sadikova | Uzbekistan |

The women's lightweight is a competition featured at the 2023 World Taekwondo Championships, and was held at the Baku Crystal Hall in Baku, Azerbaijan on 3 June 2023. Lightweights were limited to a maximum of 62 kilograms in body mass.

== Results ==
Legend

- P — Won by punitive declaration
- W — Won by withdrawal

=== Finals ===
| Semifinals | | | | Final |
| Liliia Khuzina (AIN) | 6 | 11 | 7 |
| Aaliyah Powell (GBR) | 9 | 3 | 0 | Liliia Khuzina (AIN) | 6 | 8 |
| Feruza Sadikova (UZB) | 0 | 8 | 4 | Caroline Santos (BRA) | 2 | 6 |
| Caroline Santos (BRA) | 12 | 5 | 10 |

=== Top half ===
==== Section 1 ====
Round of 64
Nazym Makhmutova (KAZ) | 3 | 6
Kasumi Hirabayashi (JPN) | 0 | 6
Merieme Khoulal (MAR) | 17 | 13
Brenda Ruiz (ARG) | 8 | 3
Maísa Monteiro (POR) | 1 | 0
Narges Mirnourollahi (IRI) | 7 | 14
Amber Heslop (AUS) | 2 | 0
Liliia Khuzina (AIN) | 14 | 11
Faith Dillon (USA) | 11 | 6
Julia Szpak (POL) | 2 | 4

Round of 32
Sarah Chaâri (BEL) | 7 | 1 | 5
Nazym Makhmutova (KAZ) | 0 | 1 | 0
Merieme Khoulal (MAR) | 1 | 2
Narges Mirnourollahi (IRI) | 8 | 4
Miljana Reljiḱ (MKD) | 4 | 1
Liliia Khuzina (AIN) | 13^{P} | 13
Faith Dillon (USA) | 4 | 5 | 0
Anna-Lena Frömming (GER) | 5 | 5 | 11

Round of 16
Sarah Chaâri (BEL) | 6 | 4
Narges Mirnourollahi (IRI) | 2 | 1
Liliia Khuzina (AIN) | 4 | 12
Anna-Lena Frömming (GER) | 1 | 0

Quarterfinals
Sarah Chaâri (BEL) | 6 | 1
Liliia Khuzina (AIN) | 9 | 3

==== Section 2 ====
Round of 64
Kawehi Iorss (FPO) | 4 | 4 | 3
Cathy Ho (HKG) | 3 | 4 | 0
Kimia Alizadeh (RTA) | 13 | 4
Daphne Stamou (GRE) | 1 | 3
Sara Jallab (BRN) | 0 | 0
Nam Min-seo (KOR) | 13 | 12
Itzel Velázquez (MEX) | W
Marthe Ostin (HAI)
Jadambagiin Ichinkhorloo (MGL) | 0 | 0
Aaliyah Powell (GBR) | 12 | 14
Cristina Gaspa (ITA) | 1 | 4 | 9
Bắc Thị Khiêm (VIE) | 2 | 2 | 7

Round of 32
Petra Štolbová (CZE) | 5 | 5 | 15
Kawehi Iorss (FPO) | 3 | 6 | 3
Kimia Alizadeh (RTA) | 11 | 12 | 6
Nam Min-seo (KOR) | 7 | 12 | 7
Itzel Velázquez (MEX) | 0 | 1
Aaliyah Powell (GBR) | 5 | 9
Cristina Gaspa (ITA) | 1 | 5
Fatima Majidova (AZE) | 0 | 4

Round of 16
Petra Štolbová (CZE) | 2 | 11
Nam Min-seo (KOR) | 3 | 13
Aaliyah Powell (GBR) | 6 | 8
Cristina Gaspa (ITA) | 4 | 3

Quarterfinals
Nam Min-seo (KOR) | 3 | 4
Aaliyah Powell (GBR) | 15 | 5

=== Bottom half ===
==== Section 3 ====
Round of 64
Viviana Márton (HUN) | 14 | 12
Nora Högfeldt (SWE) | 2 | 0
Karoline Gjelsvik (NOR) | 6 | 16
Carmen Raagmets (EST) | 2 | 3
Tamiris Sulaimanova (KGZ) | 0 | 0
Ivana Arelić (CRO) | 12 | 13
Jolanta Tarvida (LAT) | 12 | 12
Shauna Edwards-Jull (NZL) | 0 | 0
Isuangelis Soto (PUR) | 2 | 4
Yacine Diaw (SEN) | 12 | 10
Gerda Gaižauskaitė (LTU) | 0 | 0
Martina Atanasova (BUL) | 10 | 7

Round of 32
Ashley Kraayeveld (CAN) | 2 | 16 | 9
Viviana Márton (HUN) | 9 | 7 | 12
Karoline Gjelsvik (NOR) | 3 | 5
Ivana Arelić (CRO) | 4 | 12
Jolanta Tarvida (LAT) | 8 | 6
Yacine Diaw (SEN) | 7 | 0
Martina Atanasova (BUL) | 1 | 4
Feruza Sadikova (UZB) | 5 | 6

Round of 16
Viviana Márton (HUN) | 10 | 16
Ivana Arelić (CRO) | 7 | 4
Jolanta Tarvida (LAT) | 2 | 2
Feruza Sadikova (UZB) | 9 | 6

Quarterfinals
Viviana Márton (HUN) | 10 | 10
Feruza Sadikova (UZB) | 18 | 23

==== Section 4 ====
Round of 64
Lin Wei-chun (TPE) | 9 | 6
Iman Kanouté (MLI) | 2 | 3
Mell Mina (ECU) | 16 | 8 | 1
Özge Özbey (TUR) | 14 | 12 | 8
Zhou Lijun (CHN) | 6 | 8
Sania Khan (IND) | 2 | 0
Ruqia Rahmani (FIN) | 0 | 2
Sasikarn Tongchan (THA) | 14 | 12
María Álvarez (COL) | 10 | 9
Ivana Šarenac (BIH) | 0 | 4

Round of 32
Jone Magdaleno (ESP) | 7 | 6 | 0
Lin Wei-chun (TPE) | 6 | 12 | 12
Özge Özbey (TUR) | 1 | 9
Nađa Savković (SRB) | 1 | 3
Zhou Lijun (CHN) | 2 | 5
Sasikarn Tongchan (THA) | 4 | 5
María Álvarez (COL) | 7 | 3 | 2
Caroline Santos (BRA) | 5 | 9 | 14

Round of 16
Lin Wei-chun (TPE) | 4 | 6 | 9
Özge Özbey (TUR) | 16 | 5 | 4
Sasikarn Tongchan (THA) | 0 | 4
Caroline Santos (BRA) | 12 | 6

Quarterfinals
Lin Wei-chun (TPE) | 6 | 0 | 9
Caroline Santos (BRA) | 4 | 7 | 10
