= Ana Belo =

East Timorese Taekwondo practitioner (born 1999)

Personal information
- Nationality: East Timorese
- Born: 12 March 1999 (age 27)

Sport
- Sport: Taekwondo
- Weight class: 46 kg; 49 kg
Medal record
Representing Timor-Leste
Women's taekwondo
SEA Games
Silver medal – second place	2019 Philippines	46 kg
Bronze medal – third place	2017 Kuala Lumpur	49 kg
Bronze medal – third place	2023 Cambodia	49 kg
ASEAN University Games
Bronze medal – third place	2022 Ubon Ratchathani	46 kg

Ana da Costa da Silva Pinto Belo (born 12 March 1999) is an East Timorese taekwondo athlete who has competed in the 46 kg and 49 kg categories. She is a three-time medalist at the SEA Games. She has also competed at the Asian Games thrice and also competed at the 2024 Summer Olympics.

== Career ==
At the 2017 SEA Games in Kuala Lumpur, Belo competed in the 49 kg category and won a bronze medal, becoming one of three competitors in the delegation to win a medal. She made her Asian Games debut at the 2018 edition in Jakarta, where she competed in the 49 kg event.

Belo competed in the women's finweight event at the 2019 World Taekwondo Championships in Manchester, where she faced Krystsina Sauluk in the round of 64 and was disqualified. At the 2019 SEA Games in the Philippines, she competed in the 46 kg category and won a silver medal.

Belo competed at the 2022 ASEAN University Games in Ubon Ratchathani, where she competed in the 46 kg category and won a bronze medal. At the 2023 SEA Games in Cambodia, she competed in the 49 kg category and won a bronze medal.

At the 2024 Summer Olympics in Paris, Belo became first East Timorese woman to qualify to compete in taekwondo by way of a university place. She was chosen as one of the opening ceremony flag bearers for East Timor at the 2024 Summer Olympics alongside Manuel Ataide. She competed in the 49 kg event, where she was eliminated by Oumaima El-Bouchti in the qualification round. Belo and Ataide were the closing ceremony flag bearers for East Timor.

At the 2025 World Taekwondo Championships in Wuxi, she competed in the women's finweight.

Belo competed in the 49 kg event at the 2026 Asian Games held in Toyohashi, Aichi, Japan, where she was the only East Timorese woman to compete in that event.
