= 2025 World Taekwondo Championships – Women's flyweight =

Taekwondo competitions

Women's flyweight at the 2025 World Championships
- Venue: Taihu International Expo Center
- Dates: 25 October 2025
- Competitors: 50 from 49 nations

Medalists
gold medal	Liu You-yun	Chinese Taipei
silver medal	Elif Sude Akgül	Turkey
bronze medal	Nodira Akhmedova	Kazakhstan
bronze medal	Fu Xiaolu	China

The Women's flyweight competition at the 2025 World Taekwondo Championships was held on 25 October 2025 in Wuxi, China. Flyweights were limited to a maximum of 49 kilograms in body mass.

== Results ==
Legend

- P — Won by punitive declaration
- R — Won by referee stop contest

=== Finals ===
Semifinals				Final
Elif Sude Akgül (TUR)	4	0	7
Fu Xiaolu (CHN)	4	8	4	Elif Sude Akgül (TUR)	0	3	1
Nodira Akhmedova (KAZ)	2	1		Liu You-yun (TPE)	0	8	3
Liu You-yun (TPE)	2	7

=== Top half ===
==== Section 1 ====
Round of 64
Alessandra Suárez (PER)	1	7	10
Konstantina Bourogianni (GRE)	2	6	6
Ilenia Matonti (ITA)	6	1	7
Nadia Aina Syazwani Ishak (MAS)	0	2	1
Mame Diarra Loum (SEN)	2	0
Phoenix Goodman (GBR)	6	12
Henrietta Armah (GHA)	0	6
Naiara Liñán (AND)	0	9
Saffron Tambyrajah (AUS)	4	6
Ejla Makaš (BIH)	0	0

Round of 32
Supharada Ateşli (GER)	0	11
Alessandra Suárez (PER)	0	1
Ilenia Matonti (ITA)	2	7
Phoenix Goodman (GBR)	0	3
Elif Sude Akgül (TUR)	7	6
Naiara Liñán (AND)	2	1
Saffron Tambyrajah (AUS)	5	6
Ceili Peterson (GUY)	3	6

Round of 16
Supharada Ateşli (GER)	6	1	10
Ilenia Matonti (ITA)	1	5	2
Elif Sude Akgül (TUR)	2	12
Saffron Tambyrajah (AUS)	1	0

Quarterfinals
Supharada Ateşli (GER)	3	5	3
Elif Sude Akgül (TUR)	4	2	9

==== Section 2 ====
Round of 64
Marlyn Pérez (CUB)	4	3
Laylo Khasanova (UZB)	1	2
Mahla Momenzadeh (IRI)	9	7
Karabo Kula (BOT)	9	0
Náquira Tembe (MOZ)	2	2
Andrea Zambrano (MEX)	15	14
María Sara Grippoli (URU)	0	2
Hinata Okazaki (JPN)	3	4

Round of 32
Kim Hyang-gi (KOR)	8	6	7
Marlyn Pérez (CUB)	14	5	3
Mahla Momenzadeh (IRI)	8	6
Mah Teninba Fofana (FRA)	9	12
Aleksandra Georgieva (BUL)	6	5	3
Andrea Zambrano (MEX)	5	7	1
Hinata Okazaki (JPN)	2	2
Fu Xiaolu (CHN)	8	8

Round of 16
Kim Hyang-gi (KOR)	10^{P}	5
Mah Teninba Fofana (FRA)	3	4
Aleksandra Georgieva (BUL)	0	3
Fu Xiaolu (CHN)	9	8

Quarterfinals
Kim Hyang-gi (KOR)	1	1
Fu Xiaolu (CHN)	13	12

=== Bottom half ===
==== Section 3 ====
Round of 64
Trương Thị Kim Tuyền (VIE)	5	9
Samarrukh Osmanova (AZE)	4	5
Alicja Krajewska (POL)	12	6
Britney Kadewere (ZIM)	2	4
Isha Mahato (NEP)	0	0
Winda Dwi Putri (INA)	12	13
Camilly Camargo (BRA)	10	13
Twisha Kakadiya (IND)	0	0

Round of 32
Kamonchanok Seeken (THA)	4^{R}
Trương Thị Kim Tuyền (VIE)	0
Alicja Krajewska (POL)	0	3
Oleksandra Danshyna (ISR)	6	6
Josipa Kafadar (CAN)	4	6
Winda Dwi Putri (INA)	4	1
Camilly Camargo (BRA)	1	0	3
Nodira Akhmedova (KAZ)	1	4	4

Round of 16
Kamonchanok Seeken (THA)	15	2	7
Oleksandra Danshyna (ISR)	9	7	0
Josipa Kafadar (CAN)	0	5	1
Nodira Akhmedova (KAZ)	6	4	6

Quarterfinals
Kamonchanok Seeken (THA)	2	5
Nodira Akhmedova (KAZ)	3	5

==== Section 4 ====
Round of 64
Jenna Rämö (FIN)	0	3
Milica Milić (SRB)	2	6
Erika Bryhida (UKR)	4	16	4
Demi Abi Hayla (LBN)	0	18	2
Galina Medvedeva (AIN)	5	2
Andrea Ramírez (COL)	5	5
Bat-Erdeniin Uchral (MGL)	1	3	0
Maya Mata (USA)	4	0	2
Lam Siu Wai (HKG)	0	0
Ikram Dhahri (TUN)	8	3

Round of 32
Adriana Cerezo (ESP)	7	4
Milica Milić (SRB)	4	3
Erika Bryhida (UKR)	0	0
Tachiana Mangin (PHI)	8	8^{P}
Andrea Ramírez (COL)	0	1
Maya Mata (USA)	2	2
Ikram Dhahri (TUN)	0	2
Liu You-yun (TPE)	0	4

Round of 16
Adriana Cerezo (ESP)	3	0
Tachiana Mangin (PHI)	0	0
Maya Mata (USA)	0	0
Liu You-yun (TPE)	12	10^{P}

Quarterfinals
Adriana Cerezo (ESP)	2	0	10
Liu You-yun (TPE)	2	7	12
