= Liu You-yun =

Taiwanese taekwondo practitioner

Sport
- Country: Chinese Taipei
- Sport: Taekwondo
- Weight class: 49 kg
Medal record
Women's taekwondo
Representing Chinese Taipei
World Championships
Gold medal – first place	2025 Wuxi	49 kg
Asian Championships
Silver medal – second place	2026 Ulaanbaatar	49 kg

Liu You-yun (born 30 September 2006) is a female Taiwanese taekwondo athlete who competes internationally for Chinese Taipei. She won a gold medal at the 2025 World Taekwondo Championships.

== Career ==
In May 2025, she won the women's -49 kg division at the Swedish Open Taekwondo Tournament. She won the women's -49 kg category at the Charlotte 2025 World Taekwondo Grand Prix Challenge in June 2025, defeating Kazakhstan's Nodira Akhmedova in the final.

She won the gold medal at the 2025 World Taekwondo Championships in the women's flyweight division, defeating Elif Sude Akgül of Turkey in the final, where she produced a decisive head kick in the final ten seconds of the final round to win the gold medal on her senior World Taekwondo Championships debut. Earlier in the championships she had beaten Spain's former World Championship medalist Adriana Cerezo and Kazakhstan's Nodira Akhmedova.
