= 2025 World Taekwondo Championships – Women's finweight =

Taekwondo competitions

Women's finweight at the 2025 World Championships
- Venue: Taihu International Expo Center
- Dates: 27 October 2025
- Competitors: 47 from 45 nations

Medalists
gold medal	Emine Göğebakan	Turkey
silver medal	Milana Bekulova	Individual Neutral Athletes
bronze medal	Aidana Kumartayeva	Kazakhstan
bronze medal	Wang Shiyi	China

The Women's finweight competition at the 2025 World Taekwondo Championships was held on 27 October 2025 in Wuxi, China. Finweights were limited to a maximum of 46 kilograms in body mass.

== Results ==
Legend

- P — Won by punitive declaration
- W — Won by withdrawal

=== Finals ===
Semifinals			Final
Milana Bekulova (AIN)	2	8
Wang Shiyi (CHN)	2	6	Milana Bekulova (AIN)	0	4
Emine Göğebakan (TUR)	3	6	Emine Göğebakan (TUR)	5	7
Aidana Kumartayeva (KAZ)	1	2

=== Top half ===
==== Section 1 ====
Round of 64
Sarah Mack (AUS)	10	6	6
Konstantina Kokkinou (CYP)	4	18	9
Santoshi Rai (NEP)	5	0	0
Lee Ye-ji (KOR)	0	7	12
Clarence Sarza (PHI)	1	3
Vasiliki Papadopoulou (GRE)	3	3

Round of 32
Huang Ying-hsuan (TPE)	8^{P}	11^{P}
Konstantina Kokkinou (CYP)	2	1
Ruka Okamoto (JPN)	3	7
Farah Touzani (MAR)	15	20
Milana Bekulova (AIN)	2	3
Lee Ye-ji (KOR)	1	2
Vasiliki Papadopoulou (GRE)	2	4
Patcharakan Poolkerd (THA)	5	14

Round of 16
Huang Ying-hsuan (TPE)	0	4
Farah Touzani (MAR)	5	8
Milana Bekulova (AIN)	1	2	8
Patcharakan Poolkerd (THA)	2	2	4

Quarterfinals
Farah Touzani (MAR)	1	0
Milana Bekulova (AIN)	10	9

==== Section 2 ====
Round of 64
Valentina Quintana (GUA)	4	6
Stefani Nikolajeva (EST)	7	14
Madina Shoniyozova (UZB)	0	5	4
Virginia Dellán (VEN)	6	2	2
Danna Ramírez (COL)	8	4
Rahmah Al-Khawahr (KSA)	0	0
Angelique Orozco (CAN)	11	11
N'Goné Fall (SEN)	4	4

Round of 32
Džejla Makaš (BIH)	14	6
Stefani Nikolajeva (EST)	5	0
Madina Shoniyozova (UZB)	1	5
Júlia Nazário (BRA)	11	6
Iva Brajović (SRB)	6	3
Danna Ramírez (COL)	8	16
Angelique Orozco (CAN)	5	2
Wang Shiyi (CHN)	12	14

Round of 16
Džejla Makaš (BIH)	5	9
Júlia Nazário (BRA)	1	8
Danna Ramírez (COL)	4	4	6
Wang Shiyi (CHN)	4	6	7

Quarterfinals
Džejla Makaš (BIH)	4	1	2
Wang Shiyi (CHN)	3	9	10^{W}

=== Bottom half ===
==== Section 3 ====
Round of 64
Mönkhtögsiin Suvd-Erdene (MGL)	0	3
Ni Kadek Heni Prikasih (INA)	6	9
Violeta Díaz (ESP)	9	8
Aïcha Zoghbi (TUN)	2	0
Mariama Zakari (NIG)	6	9
Lyamna Saighi (ALG)	4	3
Samantha González (MEX)	4	4
Lau Tsz Wan (HKG)	4	5

Round of 32
Emine Göğebakan (TUR)	9	8	8
Ni Kadek Heni Prikasih (INA)	17	3	5
Violeta Díaz (ESP)	9	7
Etta Choi (GBR)	1	2
Rivka Bayech (ISR)	10	6	14
Mariama Zakari (NIG)	7	8	2
Lau Tsz Wan (HKG)	2	11
Kamilah Salim (HUN)	14	23

Round of 16
Emine Göğebakan (TUR)	3	3
Violeta Díaz (ESP)	2	1
Rivka Bayech (ISR)	10	1
Kamilah Salim (HUN)	15	13

Quarterfinals
Emine Göğebakan (TUR)	13	19
Kamilah Salim (HUN)	4	16

==== Section 4 ====
Round of 64
Nikola Krajewska (POL)	0	3
Aidana Kumartayeva (KAZ)	8	5
Caliana Fonseca (USA)	6	0
Vaishnave Pachota (IND)	16	8
Ana Belo (TLS)	0	0
Saeideh Nassiri (IRI)	4	6
Ida Kevine Bama (BUR)	10	5	8
Nguyễn Thị Mai (VIE)	7	6	5

Round of 32
Kiara Barroso (POR)	4	2
Aidana Kumartayeva (KAZ)	11	14^{P}
Vaishnave Pachota (IND)	5	6
Ida Tammila (FIN)	4	1
Minaya Akbarova (AZE)	0	2
Saeideh Nassiri (IRI)	5	2
Ida Kevine Bama (BUR)	4	12	3
Jaycee Bassett (WT)	7	7	4

Round of 16
Aidana Kumartayeva (KAZ)	12	3
Vaishnave Pachota (IND)	4	2
Saeideh Nassiri (IRI)	2	6
Jaycee Bassett (WT)	3	9

Quarterfinals
Aidana Kumartayeva (KAZ)	13	12
Jaycee Bassett (WT)	7	3
