= 2025 World Taekwondo Championships – Men's finweight =

Taekwondo competitions

Men's finweight at the 2025 World Championships
- Venue: Taihu International Expo Center
- Dates: 26 October 2025
- Competitors: 63 from 60 nations

Medalists
gold medal	Seo Eun-su	South Korea
silver medal	Furkan Ubeyde Çamoğlu	Turkey
bronze medal	Jakhongir Khudayberdiev	Uzbekistan
bronze medal	Aristeidis Psarros	Greece

The men's finweight competition at the 2025 World Taekwondo Championships was held on 26 October 2025 in Wuxi, China. Finweights were limited to a maximum of 54 kilograms in body mass.

== Results ==
Legend

- P — Won by punitive declaration

=== Finals ===
Semifinals			Final
Aristeidis Psarros (GRE)	4	6
Furkan Ubeyde Çamoğlu (TUR)	10	6	Furkan Ubeyde Çamoğlu (TUR)	12	7
Jakhongir Khudayberdiev (UZB)	5	10	Seo Eun-su (KOR)	14	8
Seo Eun-su (KOR)	17	11

=== Top half ===
==== Section 1 ====
Round of 64
Ihasam Rahimi (AFG)	10	2
Ožbolt Molj (SLO)	14	10
Noah Garcia (POR)	17	12
Pedro David Pedro (MOZ)	4	2
Rommel Coca (BOL)	0	0
Matheus Gilliard (BRA)	13	13
Jairo Agenjo (ESP)	18	17
Ashton Gregory-Hunt (NZL)	5	5
Muhammed Hami (TRT)	4	1
Aziz Hidayat Tumakaka (INA)	15	13
Majd Jouad (MAR)	16	5	3
Relja Ivković (SRB)	7	8	10
Yondonjamtsyn Pürevdash (MGL)	5	4
Aristeidis Psarros (GRE)	11	13

Round of 32
Moataz Assem (EGY)	13	11
Ožbolt Molj (SLO)	0	0
Noah Garcia (POR)	0	11
Matheus Gilliard (BRA)	11	23
Jairo Agenjo (ESP)	11	13
Aziz Hidayat Tumakaka (INA)	6	3
Relja Ivković (SRB)	0	11
Aristeidis Psarros (GRE)	12	18

Round of 16
Moataz Assem (EGY)	1	5	2
Matheus Gilliard (BRA)	2	3	2
Jairo Agenjo (ESP)	6	4
Aristeidis Psarros (GRE)	7	11

Quarterfinals
Matheus Gilliard (BRA)	8	3	2
Aristeidis Psarros (GRE)	3	9	8

==== Section 2 ====
Round of 64
Hristiyan Georgiev (BUL)	0	4	6
Mohamed Amine Zoghlami (TUN)	2	4	4
Souleymane Ndoye (SEN)	3	6
Dmitriy Balakhneev (AIN)	15	6
Seth Healy (AUS)	2	1
Tatsuya Kitade (JPN)	11	4
Wilfrido De la Cruz (DOM)	3	3	13
Riad Hamdi (KSA)	2	6	12
Furkan Ubeyde Çamoğlu (TUR)	12	12
Fayez Hanafy (EST)	0	0
Kurt Bryan Barbosa (PHI)	4	11
Arian Canete (USA)	4	10
Begzod Kadirkulov (KAZ)	15	9	17
Franco Moreno (PER)	13	15	5
Abtab Alam (NEP)	1	6
Fang Zheng (CHN)	10	17

Round of 32
Hristiyan Georgiev (BUL)	0	6	6
Dmitriy Balakhneev (AIN)	4	6	5
Tatsuya Kitade (JPN)	3	8
Wilfrido De la Cruz (DOM)	11	13
Furkan Ubeyde Çamoğlu (TUR)	10	9
Kurt Bryan Barbosa (PHI)	1	5
Begzod Kadirkulov (KAZ)	9	2
Fang Zheng (CHN)	16	11

Round of 16
Hristiyan Georgiev (BUL)	7	15
Wilfrido De la Cruz (DOM)	3	11
Furkan Ubeyde Çamoğlu (TUR)	11	4	2
Fang Zheng (CHN)	0	6	1

Quarterfinals
Hristiyan Georgiev (BUL)	3	3
Furkan Ubeyde Çamoğlu (TUR)	4	11

=== Bottom half ===
==== Section 3 ====
Round of 64
Jakhongir Khudayberdiev (UZB)	15	12
Wisawakorn Jaichoo (THA)	7	9
Chau Ngai Long (HKG)	9	8
Edgar Hernández (MEX)	10	8
Mussa Marwan (SWE)	9^{P}	8
Seifeddine Medjahed (ALG)	12	2
Tatenda Bero (ZIM)	9	0
Luka Turkalj (CRO)	19	12
Andrea Conti (ITA)	8	12
Ahmed Ahqaaf (LBA)	3	0
Keston Pang (SGP)	9	11
Nibras Al-Tooqi (OMA)	15	12
Artiom Roșca (MDA)	8	4	4
Chan Iek Hei (MAC)	3	7	7
Prodromos Hadjicosti (CYP)	5	0
Nithan Brindamohan (CAN)	11	12

Round of 32
Jakhongir Khudayberdiev (UZB)	15	12
Edgar Hernández (MEX)	14	0
Mussa Marwan (SWE)	2	4
Luka Turkalj (CRO)	0	3
Andrea Conti (ITA)	9	15
Nibras Al-Tooqi (OMA)	2	2
Chan Iek Hei (MAC)	2	3	8
Nithan Brindamohan (CAN)	7	3	5

Round of 16
Jakhongir Khudayberdiev (UZB)	4	13	9
Mussa Marwan (SWE)	5	3	0
Andrea Conti (ITA)	4	8
Chan Iek Hei (MAC)	1	6

Quarterfinals
Jakhongir Khudayberdiev (UZB)	2	6
Andrea Conti (ITA)	2	6

==== Section 4 ====
Round of 64
Seo Eun-su (KOR)	14	14
Lévy Obiang Essono (GAB)	2	2
Nguyễn Hồng Trọng (VIE)	23	15	10
Nurkhan Samidinov (KGZ)	12	24	7
Yahor Kazlou (AIN)	14	10
Abrar Haji Bakar (BRU)	2	8
Daniel Ramírez (COL)	8	8
Tom Pashcovsky (ISR)	5	4
Mahamadou Amadou (NIG)	12	19
Yahya Al-Enezi (KUW)	0	7
Ankit Mer (IND)	4	11
Bahruz Guluzade (AZE)	4	2
Mehdi Razmian (IRI)	6	13
Li Ci-en (TPE)	2	5
Christopher Kajira (ZAM)	0	2
Jaafar Al-Daoud (JOR)	12	14

Round of 32
Seo Eun-su (KOR)	15^{P}	20
Nguyễn Hồng Trọng (VIE)	7	7
Yahor Kazlou (AIN)	1	3
Daniel Ramírez (COL)	1	3
Mahamadou Amadou (NIG)	3	1
Ankit Mer (IND)	4	7
Mehdi Razmian (IRI)	1	4	6
Jaafar Al-Daoud (JOR)	4	0	10

Round of 16
Seo Eun-su (KOR)	13	16
Daniel Ramírez (COL)	0	3
Ankit Mer (IND)	0	2
Jaafar Al-Daoud (JOR)	2	12

Quarterfinals
Seo Eun-su (KOR)	23	15
Jaafar Al-Daoud (JOR)	16	3
