= Chen Ximin =

Chinese taekwondo practitioner

Personal information
- Nationality: Chinese

Sport
- Sport: Taekwondo
- Weight class: 62 kg
Medal record
Women's taekwondo
Representing China
World Championships
Bronze medal – third place	2025 Wuxi	62 kg

Chen Ximin is a Chinese taekwondo practitioner. She won a bronze medal at the 2025 World Taekwondo Championships.

== Career ==
In September 2025, she defeated three former world champions to win the gold medal at the Chinese National Taekwondo Championships and earn a place on the Chinese team for the upcoming World Championships. In October 2025, she competed at the 2025 World Taekwondo Championships and won a bronze medal in the 62 kg category, losing to Viviana Márton in the semifinals.
