= Maksym Manenkov =

Ukrainian taekwondo practitioner (born 2006)

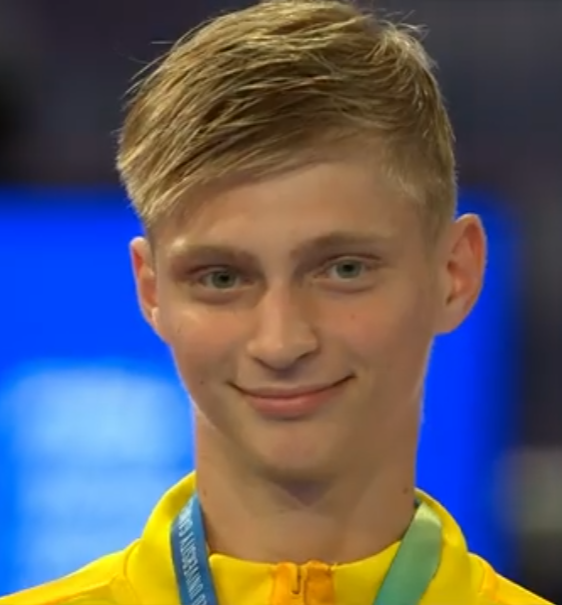
- At the 2025 Summer World University Games

Personal information
- Nationality: Ukraine
- Born: 13 March 2006 (age 20) Zaporizhzhia, Ukraine

Sport
- Sport: Taekwondo
- Event: 58 kg
Medal record
Men's taekwondo
Representing Ukraine
European Championships
Bronze medal – third place	2024 Belgrade	54 kg
Summer World University Games
Gold medal – first place	2025 Essen	58 kg
World Junior Championships
Bronze medal – third place	2022 Sofia	45 kg
European Junior Championships
Silver medal – second place	2021 Sarajevo	45 kg

Maksym Manenkov (Ukrainian: Максим Маненков; born 13 March 2006 in Zaporizhzhia) is a Ukrainian taekwondo practitioner. He is 2024 European Championships bronze medallist. In 2025, he became World University Games champion.
