= Bruna Vuletić =

Croatian taekwondo practitioner

Personal information
- Nationality: Croatian
- Born: 3 July 1999 (age 26)

Sport
- Country: Croatia
- Sport: Taekwondo
Medal record
Representing Croatia
Women's taekwondo
World Championships
Bronze medal – third place	2019 Manchester	Lightweight

Bruna Vuletić (born 3 July 1999) is a Croatian taekwondo practitioner.

She won a bronze medal in lightweight at the 2019 World Taekwondo Championships, after being defeated by Caroline Santos in the semifinal. In 2019, she represented Croatia at the Summer Universiade in Naples, Italy and she won one of the bronze medals in the women's 62 kg event.
