= Fu Xiaolu =

Chinese taekwondo practitioner

Personal information
- Nationality: Chinese

Sport
- Sport: Taekwondo
- Weight class: 49 kg
Medal record
Women's taekwondo
Representing China
World Championships
| Bronze medal – third place | 2025 Wuxi | 49 kg |
Asian Championships
| Bronze medal – third place | 2026 Ulaanbaatar | 49 kg |

Fu Xiaolu (Chinese: 傅晓璐) is a Chinese taekwondo practitioner. She won a bronze medal at the 2025 World Taekwondo Championships.

== Career ==
In September 2025, Fu competed at the 15th National Games in Huizhou, Guangdong, and won a gold medal in the 49 kg category, defeating the 13th National Games champion Tan Xueqin and the 14th National Games champion Zuo Ju to reach the finals. The next month she competed at the 2025 World Taekwondo Championships and won a bronze medal in the 49 kg category.
