= Elif Sude Akgül =

Turkish taekwondo practitioner

Personal information
- Born: 8 March 2006 (age 20) Ordu, Turkey
- Education: Haliç University

Sport
- Country: Turkey
- Sport: Taekwondo
- Weight class: 49 kg
Medal record
Women's taekwondo
Representing Turkey
World Championships
| Silver medal – second place | 2025 Wuxi | 49 kg |
European Championships
| Gold medal – first place | 2026 Munich | 49 kg |
Islamic Solidarity Games
| Silver medal – second place | 2025 Riyadh | 51 kg |
Mediterranean Games
| Gold medal – first place | 2026 Taranto | 49 kg |
European U21 Championships
| Gold medal – first place | 2024 Sarajevo | 49 kg |
European Junior Championships
| Bronze medal – third place | 2022 Tirana | 49 kg |
European Youth Championships
| Gold medal – first place | 2023 Tallinn | 49 kg |

Elif Sude Akgül (born 8 March 2006) is a Turkish female Taekwondo practitioner. She was a silver medalist at the 2025 World Taekwondo Championships and a gold medalist at the 2026 European Taekwondo Championships.

== Career ==
From Ordu, she studied at the Haliç University. Akgül won gold for Turkey in the -49kg division at the 2023 World Taekwondo Grand Slam Champions Series in Wuxi.

Elif Sude Akgül won a gold medal in the 49 kg category at the European U21 Taekwondo Championship in Sarajevo in November 2024.

A silver medalist at the 2025 World Taekwondo Championships in the women's flyweight division, she defeated Supharada Anya Ateşli of Germany in the quarter final and Xiaolu Fu of China in the semi-final, before finishing as runner-up to Liu You-yun of Chinese Taipei in the final.

In May 2026, she won a gold medal at the 2026 European Taekwondo Championships in Munich, Germany.
