= Wang Shiyi =

Chinese taekwondo practitioner

Personal information
- Nationality: Chinese

Sport
- Sport: Taekwondo
- Weight class: 46 kg
Medal record
Women's taekwondo
Representing China
World Championships
Bronze medal – third place	2025 Wuxi	46 kg
Asian Championships
Gold medal – first place	2024 Da Nang	49 kg

Wang Shiyi is a Chinese taekwondo practitioner. She won a bronze medal at the 2025 World Taekwondo Championships.

== Career ==
Wang competed at the 2024 Asian Taekwondo Championships and won a gold medal in the 49 kg category, defeating Panipak Wongpattanakit in the finals.
