= Viviana Márton =

Hungarian taekwondo practitioner (born 2006)

Personal information
- Nationality: Hungarian, Spanish
- Born: 16 February 2006 (age 20) Tenerife, Spain

Sport
- Country: Hungary
- Sport: Taekwondo
- Weight class: Featherweight
- Club: Hankuk International School
- Coached by: Suvi Mikkonen
Medal record
Women's taekwondo
Representing Hungary
Olympic Games
Gold medal – first place	2024 Paris	67 kg
World Championships
Silver medal – second place	2025 Wuxi	62 kg
European Championships
Gold medal – first place	2026 Munich	62 kg
European U21 Championships
Gold medal – first place	2023 Bucharest	62 kg
European Junior Championships
Gold medal – first place	2021 Sarajevo	63 kg
Gold medal – first place	2023 Tallinn	63 kg

Viviana Márton Kiss (born 16 February 2006) is a Hungarian taekwondo athlete. She won the Olympic gold medal in the women's 67 kg in the 2024 Summer Olympic Games in Paris.

== Early life ==
The daughter of Zsolt and Barbara Márton, her father formerly did kickboxing in Budapest and her mother played handball. Her parents moved to the Canary Islands in the early 2000s. She was born in Tenerife, and moved to Madrid in 2018.

== Career ==
She trained at the Hankuk club in Madrid and where she was coached by Finnish former Olympic Taekwondo practitioner Suvi Mikkonen. In 2024, she transferred to Újpesti TE in Budapest, Hungary.

=== Junior ===
She won the 2021 European Junior Taekwondo Championships in Sarajevo, beating Greek Theopoula Sarvanaki in the final of the −63 kg division.

She won gold at the Junior European Championships in taekwondo in Tallinn in August 2023 defeating Croat Dora Meštrović in the final of the 63 kg division.

She won the 2023 European U21 Taekwondo Championships 62 kg title in Bucharest in November 2023, defeating her sister Luana in the final.

=== Senior ===
She competed at the 2023 European Games in the 67 kg category in Kraków.

She competed at the 2023 World Taekwondo Championships and reached the quarterfinals of the 62 kg category in Baku.

She competed at the 2024 European Taekwondo Olympic Qualification Tournament in Sofia, Bulgaria, and qualified for the 2024 Olympic Games in the −67 kg division. Competing at the Games on 9 August 2024, she won the gold medal at the 67 kg weight category, also known as welterweight, after winning four fights and defeating the Serbian Aleksandra Perišić in the final by 2–0.

She was a bronze medalist at the 2025 Belgian Open and won the British Taekwondo International Open in Manchester in March 2025. In September, she won the 2025 German Open in the -62kg division. In October, she competed at the 2025 World Taekwondo Championships and won a silver medal in the 62 kg category, losing to Wafa Masghouni in the finals. Márton led throughout the first round, before Masghouni landed a body kick in the closing seconds to tie the score at 7–7 and win the round on connections. The second round remained scoreless, but Masghouni once again won the round on connections. On her way to the final she did not lose a round, and recorded a win over defending champion Liliia Khuzina in the quarterfinals.

In May 2026, she was the gold medalist at the 2026 European Taekwondo Championships in Munich, Germany, having faced Spaniard Elsa Secanell in the final.

== Personal life ==
She has a twin sister, Luana Márton, who also competes internationally in Taekwondo.
