= Theopoula Sarvanaki =

Greek taekwondo practitioner

Thenia Sarvanaki
Personal information
- Nationality: Greek
- Born: Theopoula Sarvanaki; 23 August 2004 (age 21)

Sport
- Country: Greece
- Sport: Taekwondo
- Weight class: Welterweight
Medal record
Women's taekwondo
Representing Greece
World Championships
Silver medal – second place	2022 Guadalajara	62kg
European Junior Championships
Silver medal – second place	2021 Sarajevo	63kg

Theopoula “Thenia" Sarvanaki (born 23 August 2004) is a Greek Taekwondo practitioner. She was a silver medalist at the 2022 World Taekwondo Championships.

== Early life ==
Born in Thessaloniki, she started taekwondo at the age of five years-old.

== Career ==
=== Junior ===
A successful junior, she won gold at the European Championships in the 55 kg category in Spain in 2018. She finished as runner-up in the −63 kg division at 2021 European Junior Taekwondo Championships in Sarajevo, losing out to Hungarian Viviana Marton in the final.

=== Senior ===
Stepping up to the senior ranks, she was fifth at the Manchester Grand Prix in May 2022. She was a silver medalist in the Women's lightweight division at the 2022 World Taekwondo Championships in Guadalajara, aged 18 years-old. She reached the final with a victory against Feruza Sadikova, but was defeated in the final by Belgian Sarah Chaari. In October 2022, she won the Dutch Open. She dedicated the win to her compatriot and twice Olympic medalist Alexandros Nikolaidis who had died shortly beforehand.

In February 2023, she won gold at the Presidents Cup in Antalya, Turkey, defeating the 2022 European Champion Jone Magdaleno of Spain in the final. That month, she was selected for the 2023 European Games in Kraków.

In May 2023, she won gold at the European Club Championships in Sofia, Bulgaria. She did so without losing a single round in her four victorious matches. Later that month, she competed at the 2023 World Taekwondo Championships in Baku where she lost to eventual winner Magda Wiet-Hénin.

In October 2025, she was selected to compete at the 2025 World Taekwondo Championships in Wuxi, China, in October 2025, in the women's lightweight division.
