= 2024 European Taekwondo Championships – Men's 54 kg =

Men's 54 kg at the 2024 European Taekwondo Championships
- Venue: Belgrade Fair – Hall 1
- Location: Belgrade, Serbia
- Dates: 9 May
- Competitors: 22 from 22 nations

Medalists
gold medal	Furkan Ubeyde Çamoğlu	Turkey
silver medal	Konstantinos Dimitropoulos	Greece
bronze medal	Josip Teskera	Croatia
bronze medal	Maksym Manenkov	Ukraine

The men's 54 kg competition at the 2024 European Taekwondo Championships was held on 9 May 2024.

== Results ==
=== Finals ===
Semifinals
Josip Teskera (CRO)	1
Furkan Ubeyde Çamoğlu (TUR)	2
Konstantinos Dimitropoulos (GRE)	2
Maksym Manenkov (UKR)	1

Final
Furkan Ubeyde Çamoğlu (TUR)	2
Konstantinos Dimitropoulos (GRE)	1

=== Top half ===
==== Section 1 ====
Round of 32
Aleks Melikyan (ARM)	1
Mussa Marwan (SWE)	2

Round of 16
Josip Teskera (CRO)	2
Mussa Marwan (SWE)	0
Sayyad Dadashov (AZE)	2
Domen Molj (SLO)	0

Quarterfinals
Josip Teskera (CRO)	2
Sayyad Dadashov (AZE)	1

==== Section 2 ====
Round of 32
Diego dos Santos (POR)	0
Daniel Mehlmann (GBR)	2
Furkan Ubeyde Çamoğlu (TUR)	2
Amine Boukarnia (FRA)	0

Round of 16
Tom Pashcovsky (ISR)	2
Daniel Mehlmann (GBR)	1
Furkan Ubeyde Çamoğlu (TUR)	2
Relja Ivković (SRB)	0

Quarterfinals
Tom Pashcovsky (ISR)	1
Furkan Ubeyde Çamoğlu (TUR)	2

=== Bottom half ===
==== Section 3 ====
Round of 32
Prodromos Hadjicosti (CYP)	0
Yones Aulaqi (DEN)	2
Milan Molle (NED)	2
Faruk Ivan (ROU)	0

Round of 16
Konstantinos Dimitropoulos (GRE)	2
Yones Aulaqi (DEN)	0
Milan Molle (NED)	2
Hristiyan Georgiev (BUL)	0

Quarterfinals
Konstantinos Dimitropoulos (GRE)	2
Milan Molle (NED)	0

==== Section 4 ====
Round of 32
Yahor Kazlou (AIN)
Igor Tabacari (MDA)

Round of 16
Maksym Manenkov (UKR)	2
Zack Sarsoza (GBR)	0
Yahor Kazlou (AIN)	1
Andrea Conti (ITA)	2

Quarterfinals
Maksym Manenkov (UKR)	2
Andrea Conti (ITA)	1
