= Aristeidis Psarros =

Greek taekwondo practitioner (born 2008)

Aristidis Psarros
Personal information
- Native name: Αριστείδης Νικόλαος Ψαρρός
- Full name: Aristeidis Nikolaos Psarros
- Born: 11 April 2008 (age 18)

Sport
- Country: Greece
- Sport: Taekwondo
- Event: 54 kg
Medal record
Representing Greece
World Championships
Bronze medal – third place	2025 Wuxi	54 kg
European Championships
Bronze medal – third place	2026 Munich	54 kg
World Junior Championships
Gold medal – first place	2024 Chuncheon	51 kg
European Junior Championships
Gold medal – first place	2025 Aigle	55 kg
European Youth Olympic Festival
Gold medal – first place	2025 Skopje	55 kg

Aristidis Psarros (Αριστείδης Νικόλαος Ψαρρός; born 11 April 2008) is a Greek taekwondo practitioner. He won the bronze medal at the 2025 World Taekwondo Championships.

== Career ==
Psarros represented Greece in international tournaments from the youth age categories onward. In 2023, he won the gold medal in the 48 kg event at the European Junior Taekwondo Championships in Tallinn. The same year, he also achieved results in the 51 kg event at international tournaments including the Polish Open, Serbia Open and Balkan Cup.

In October 2024, he competed at the 2024 World Taekwondo Junior Championships in Chuncheon, South Korea and won a gold medal in the 51 kg event. During the tournament, he defeated Seo Eunsu, Alexander Sherratt, Ahmed Yahya Mohamed El Sayed and Amirmohammad Nasirahmadi to reach the final. In the final, he defeated Artiom Rosca 2–0 to become World Junior Champion. The next month he competed at the 2024 European U21 Taekwondo Championships in Sarajevo. After defeating Arian Miakhel in the opening round, he lost to Spain's Jairo Agenjo Trigos in the round of 16.

In 2025, he won gold medals in the 54 kg event at the Bulgaria Open in Sofia and the European edition of the WT President's Cup. In July 2025, he competed at the 2025 European Youth Summer Olympic Festival in Skopje, North Macedonia, and won a gold medal in the 55 kg event. During the tournament, he defeated opponents from Poland, Hungary, Spain and Italy to reach the final, where he defeated France's Eliot Guardiola 2–0.

In October 2025, he competed at the 2025 World Taekwondo Championships in Wuxi, China, and won a bronze medal in the 54 kg event. He defeated Mongolia's Purevdash Yondonjamts in the opening round, Serbia's Relja Ivković in the round of 32, Spain's Jairo Agenjo Trigos in the round of 16 and Brazil's Matheus Gilliard Goncalves in the quarterfinals. During the semifinals, he lost to Turkey's Furkan Ubeyde Çamoğlu and finished third. In November 2025, he competed at the 2025 European Junior Taekwondo Championships in Aigle, Switzerland, and won a gold medal in the 55 kg event. He defeated Italy's Abderrahman Touiar 2–0 in the final to become European Junior Champion.

In 2026, he won the gold medal in the 58 kg event at the Dutch Open in Eindhoven. In May 2026, he competed at the 2026 European Taekwondo Championships in Munich, Germany, and won a bronze medal in the 54 kg event. He lost to Spain's Jairo Agenjo Trigos in the semifinals.
