= Jakhongir Khudayberdiev =

Uzbekistani taekwondo practitioner

Personal information
- Nationality: Uzbekistani
- Born: 8 January 2003 (age 23)

Sport
- Sport: Taekwondo
- Weight class: 54 kg
Medal record
Men's taekwondo
Representing Uzbekistan
World Championships
Bronze medal – third place	2025 Wuxi	54 kg
Asian Championships
Bronze medal – third place	2024 Da Nang	54 kg
Bronze medal – third place	2026 Ulaanbaatar	54 kg
Islamic Solidarity Games
Bronze medal – third place	2025 Riyadh	54 kg

Jakhongir Khudayberdiev (born 8 January 2003) is an Uzbekistani taekwondo practitioner. He won a bronze medal at the 2025 World Taekwondo Championships.

== Career ==
Khudayberdiev competed at the 2024 Asian Taekwondo Championships and won a bronze medal in the 54 kg category. In October 2025, he competed at the 2025 World Taekwondo Championships and won a bronze medal in the 54 kg category.
