= Emine Göğebakan =

Turkish taekwondo practitioner (born 2001)

Personal information
- Born: 12 August 2001 (age 24) Çanakkale, Turkey
- Education: Anadolu University
- Height: 155 cm (5 ft 1 in)
- Weight: 46 kg (101 lb)

Sport
- Country: Turkey
- Sport: Taekwondo
Medal record
Women's taekwondo
Representing Turkey
World Championships
Gold medal – first place	2025 Wuxi	46 kg
European Championships
Silver medal – second place	2022 Manchester	46 kg
Silver medal – second place	2026 Munich	46 kg
Islamic Solidarity Games
Bronze medal – third place	2025 Riyadh	46 kg
European U21 Championships
Bronze medal – third place	2018 Warsaw	46 kg
World Junior Championships
Silver medal – second place	2018 Hammamet	42 kg
European Junior Championships
Gold medal – first place	2017 Larnaca	42 kg

Emine Göğebakan (born 2001) is a Turkish taekwondo practitioner. She won the gold medal in the women's finweight event at the 2025 World Taekwondo Championships.

== Sport career ==
Emine Göğebakan won the silver medal in the women's 46 kg event at the 2022 European Taekwondo Championships held in Manchester. After receiving a bye in the first round, she defeated Jelena Peruničić of Montenegro 27–6 by point gap in the second round, and beat Dalya Rehani of France 21–5 in the quarterfinals to advance to the semifinals. There, she overcame Rivka Bayech of Israel 64–51 to reach the final, where she lost 32–26 to Croatia’s Lena Stojković and won the silver medal.

At the 2025 World Taekwondo Championships held in Wuxi, China, Emine Göğebakan competed in the women’s 46 kg category. She received a bye in the first round and defeated Ni Kadek Heni Prikasih of Indonesia 17–3 and 5–3 in the second round. In the round of 16, she overcame Spain’s Violeta Díaz 3–2 and 3–1, and in the quarterfinals she beat Hungary’s Kamilah Salim 13–4 and 19–16 to advance to the semifinals. There, she defeated Kazakhstan’s Aidana Kumartayeva 3–1 and 6–2 to reach the final, where she faced Russia’s Milana Bekulova, competing as an Individual Neutral Athlete. Göğebakan won the final 5–3 and 7–6 to claim her first world title.

She took the bronze medal at the 2025 Islamic Solidarity Games in Riyadh, Saudi Arabia.

== Tournament record ==
Year	Event	Location	G-Rank	Place
2022	European Championships	(United Kingdom) Manchester	G-4	2nd
2022	Spanish Open	(Spain) La Nucia	G-1	1st
2022	WT Presidents Cup - Europe	(Albania) Durrës	G-1	1st
2021	Turkish Open	(Turkey) Istanbul	G-1	1st
2021	Montenegro Open	(Montenegro) Podgorica	G-1	1st
2021	WT Presidents Cup - Europe	(Turkey) Istanbul	G-1	2nd
2021	Bosnia Herzegovina Open	(Bosnia and Herzegovina) Sarajevo	G-1	3rd
2021	Multi European Games	(Bulgaria) Sofia	G-1	3rd
2020	Turkish Open	(Turkey) Istanbul	G-1	2nd
2019	Turkish Open	(Turkey) Antalya	G-1	3rd
2018	World Junior Championships	(Tunisia) Hammamet	G-12	2nd
2018	European U-21 Championships	(Turkey) Istanbul	G-4	3rd
2018	Turkish Open	(Turkey) Istanbul	G-1	1st
2018	European Clubs Championships	(Turkey) Istanbul	G-1	1st
2018	Multi European Games	(Bulgaria) Plovdiv	G-1	3rd
2018	Dutch Open	(Netherlands) Eindhoven	G-1	2nd
2017	European Youth Championships	(Cyprus) Larnaca	G-4	1st
2016	Turkish Open	(Turkey) Antalya	G-1	3rd
2014	World Cadets Championships	(Azerbaijan) Baku	G-12	3rd
