= Milana Bekulova =

Russian taekwondo practitioner (born 2005)

Personal information
- Native name: Милана Беслановна Бекулова
- Full name: Milana Beslanovna Bekulova
- Nationality: Russian
- Born: 19 December 2005 (age 20)

Sport
- Sport: Taekwondo
- Weight class: 46 kg
Medal record
Women's taekwondo
Representing Individual Neutral Athletes
World Championships
Silver medal – second place	2025 Wuxi	46 kg
World U21 Championships
Gold medal – first place	2025 Nairobi	49 kg

Milana Beslanovna Bekulova (Russian: Милана Беслановна Бекулова; born 19 December 2005) is a Russian taekwondo practitioner. She won a silver medal at the 2025 World Taekwondo Championships.

== Career ==
In May 2025, Bekulova competed at the 10th World Taekwondo Presidents Cup in Sofia, Bulgaria, and won a gold medal in the 46 kg category. The next month she competed at the World Taekwondo Grand Prix Challenge in Charlotte, North Carolina, and won a bronze medal in the 49 kg category. In October 2025, she competed at the 2025 World Taekwondo Championships and won a silver medal in the 46 kg category, losing to Emine Göğebakan in the finals. In December 2025, she competed at the 2025 World U21 Taekwondo Championships and won a gold medal in the 49 kg category.
