= Lev Korneev =

Serbian taekwondo practitioner (born 2005)

Personal information
- Nationality: Serbian
- Born: 15 March 2005 (age 21) Mozdok, Russia
- Height: 183 cm (6 ft 0 in)
- Weight: 58 kg (128 lb) 63 kg

Sport
- Sport: Taekwondo
- Coached by: Dragan Jović
Medal record
Men's taekwondo
Representing Serbia
European Championships
Silver medal – second place	2024 Belgrade	58 kg
European Championships OWC
Bronze medal – third place	2023 Tallinn	58 kg
European U21 Championships
Bronze medal – third place	2023 Bucharest	58 kg

Lev Korneev (Serbian Cyrillic: Лев Корнејев, romanized: Lev Kornejev, born 15 March 2005) is a Serbian taekwondo practitioner. He was a silver medalist at the 2024 European Taekwondo Championships and competed at the 2024 Paris Olympics.

== Career ==
=== Senior ===
==== 2023 ====
He was a bronze medalist at the 2023 European Taekwondo Championships OWC in Tallinn, in the men's -58 kg event. It was his career's first European medal. He lost out to Gashim Magomedov from Azerbaijan in the semifinal.

Korneev was a bronze medalist at the 2023 European U21 Taekwondo Championships in Bucharest.

==== 2024 ====
He was a silver medalist at the 2024 European Taekwondo Championships in Belgrade in the men's 58 kg category. Korneev entered the European Olympic qualifying tournament in Sofia, Bulgaria in March 2024. He was subsequently selected for the 2024 Summer Olympics in Paris. He began his Games with a win on 7 August 2024.
