= Seo Eun-su =

South Korean taekwondo practitioner

Personal information
- Nationality: South Korean

Sport
- Sport: Taekwondo
- Weight class: 54 kg
Medal record
Men's taekwondo
Representing South Korea
World Championships
Gold medal – first place	2025 Wuxi	54 kg

Seo Eun-su (Korean: 서은수) is a South Korean taekwondo practitioner. He won a gold medal at the 2025 World Taekwondo Championships.

== Career ==
In 2024, Seo competed at the 51st High School Federation President's Cup and was named the men's Outstanding Player Award winner with 101 points. He competed at the 2025 World Taekwondo Championships and won a gold medal in the 54 kg category, defeating Furkan Ubeyde Çamoğlu in the finals. He didn't drop a single round during his World Taekwondo Championships debut.
