= Gabriella Blewitt =

Australian taekwondo practitioner (born 2007)

Personal information
- Nationality: Australian
- Born: 28 March 2007 (age 19)

Sport
- Sport: Taekwondo
- Weight class: 62 kg
Medal record
Women's taekwondo
Representing Australia
World Championships
Bronze medal – third place	2025 Wuxi	62 kg

Gabriella Blewitt (born 28 March 2007) is an Australian taekwondo practitioner. She was a bronze medalist for Australia at the 2025 World Taekwondo Championships.

== Biography ==
Born on the 28 March 2007, Brewitt is from Frenchs Forest in Northern Sydney, before studying for a Bachelor of Biomedicine at Melbourne University. She is a member of Spirit Taekwondo in New South Wales having started taekwondo at the age of four years-old. When she was aged 17 years-old, Blewitt was selected into the Australian National Performance Centre (NPC) in Melbourne. She was a quarter finalist at the 2024 World Taekwondo Junior Championships, and won medals at the junior level at the 2024 US Open and 2024 Canada Open. She won the Australian Open as a senior and won the bronze medal at the 2024 Oceania Presidents Cup.

Brewitt competed for Australia at the 2025 World Taekwondo Championships, winning a bronze medal in the women's lightweight division, reaching the semi-finals with a win over Mell Mina of Ecuador, before facing eventual gold medalist Wafa Masghouni of Tunisia in her medal match. In December 2025, she was a quarter-finalist at the 2025 World U21 Taekwondo Championships in Nairobi.
