= Aidana Kumartayeva =

Kazakhstani Taekwondo practitioner

Personal information
- Native name: Айдана Құмартаева
- Nationality: Kazakhstani

Sport
- Sport: Taekwondo
- Weight class: 46 kg
Medal record
Women's taekwondo
Representing Kazakhstan
World Championships
Bronze medal – third place	2025 Wuxi	46 kg

Aidana Kumartayeva is a Kazakhstani taekwondo practitioner. She won a bronze medal at the 2025 World Taekwondo Championships.

== Career ==
Kumartayeva made her World Taekwondo Championships debut at the 2025 World Taekwondo Championships. She won a bronze medal in the 46 kg category, losing to Emine Göğebakan in the semifinals.
