= 2021 European Junior Taekwondo Championships =

- Venue: Hotel Hills
- Location: Sarajevo, Bosnia and Herzegovina
- Dates: 12–15 November

The 2021 European Junior Taekwondo Championships, the 23rd edition of the European Junior Taekwondo Championships, will held in Sarajevo, Bosnia and Herzegovina at the Hotel Hills from 12 to 15 November 2021.

== Medal table ==
* Host nation (Bosnia and Herzegovina)

Rank	Nation	Gold	Silver	Bronze	Total
1	Russia	7	1	1	9
2	Croatia	3	0	2	5
3	Turkey	2	2	4	8
4	Italy	2	2	1	5
5	Azerbaijan	2	0	2	4
6	Spain	1	4	4	9
7	Hungary	1	1	0	2
8	Belgium	1	0	2	3
9	Slovenia	1	0	0	1
10	Ukraine	0	3	4	7
11	Serbia	0	3	2	5
12	Belarus	0	1	3	4
13	France	0	1	2	3
13	Greece	0	1	2	3
15	Bosnia and Herzegovina*	0	1	1	2
16	Great Britain	0	0	4	4
17	Czech Republic	0	0	2	2
18	Denmark	0	0	1	1
18	Germany	0	0	1	1
18	Poland	0	0	1	1
18	Sweden	0	0	1	1
Totals (21 entries)		20	20	40	80

== Medal summary ==
=== Men ===
Event	Gold	Silver	Bronze
−45 kg	Lev Maiorko; Russia	Maksym Manenkov; Ukraine	Punhan Mursalov; Azerbaijan
−45 kg	Lev Maiorko; Russia	Maksym Manenkov; Ukraine	Owen Blunt; Great Britain
−48 kg	Idar Bagov; Russia	Marcos Jiménez; Spain	Teimur Saidi; Ukraine
−48 kg	Idar Bagov; Russia	Marcos Jiménez; Spain	Alexandros Barkof; Greece
−51 kg	Sayyad Dadashov; Azerbaijan	Leon Eloian; Russia	Yunus Emre Taş; Turkey
−51 kg	Sayyad Dadashov; Azerbaijan	Leon Eloian; Russia	Yones Darid Aulaqi; Denmark
−55 kg	Ilia Gikmatov; Russia	Jorge Martínez; Spain	Teodoro Del Vecchio; Italy
−55 kg	Ilia Gikmatov; Russia	Jorge Martínez; Spain	Konstantinos Dimitropoulos; Greece
−59 kg	Ömer Faruk Dayıoğlu; Turkey	Maksim Bandarevich; Belarus	Jesús Fraile; Spain
−59 kg	Ömer Faruk Dayıoğlu; Turkey	Maksim Bandarevich; Belarus	Aron Söderlund; Sweden
−63 kg	Dennis Baretta; Italy	Marko Burušić; Serbia	Volodymyr Bystrov; Ukraine
−63 kg	Dennis Baretta; Italy	Marko Burušić; Serbia	Stepan Baranov; Russia
−68 kg	Lin Kovačič; Slovenia	Strahinja Milinković; Serbia	Kiryl Dudarau; Belarus
−68 kg	Lin Kovačič; Slovenia	Strahinja Milinković; Serbia	Andrii Chumachenko; Ukraine
-73 kg	Yiğithan Kılıç; Turkey	Mikel Fernández; Spain	Oleksandr Chumachenko; Ukraine
-73 kg	Yiğithan Kılıç; Turkey	Mikel Fernández; Spain	Adam Jochman; Czech Republic
-78 kg	Vito Krpan; Croatia	Rahmet Baran Şimşek; Turkey	Dimitrije Ajduković; Serbia
-78 kg	Vito Krpan; Croatia	Rahmet Baran Şimşek; Turkey	Ilija Jukić; Bosnia and Herzegovina
+78 kg	Antonio Gerrone; Italy	Ilya Lipatov; Russia	Daniel Barun; Croatia
+78 kg	Antonio Gerrone; Italy	Ilya Lipatov; Russia	Sergio Troitiño; Spain

=== Women ===
Event	Gold	Silver	Bronze
−42 kg	Zemfira Hasanzade; Azerbaijan	Giulia Galiero; Italy	Antonina Walczak; Poland
−42 kg	Zemfira Hasanzade; Azerbaijan	Giulia Galiero; Italy	Nehir Geniş; Turkey
−44 kg	Alisa Angelova; Russia	Lana Komnenović; Serbia	Ana López; Spain
−44 kg	Alisa Angelova; Russia	Lana Komnenović; Serbia	Hanne Waerzeggers; Belgium
−46 kg	Anna Titarenko; Russia	Elisabetta Badioli; Italy	Olga Papageorgiou; Greece
−46 kg	Anna Titarenko; Russia	Elisabetta Badioli; Italy	Milica Milić; Serbia
−49 kg	Bruna Duvančić; Croatia	Aleyna Şenyurt; Turkey	Latisha Garbett; Great Britain
−49 kg	Bruna Duvančić; Croatia	Aleyna Şenyurt; Turkey	Maysane Kamkasoumphou; France
−52 kg	Nika Karabatić; Croatia	Iris Ducos; France	Caroline Volders; Belgium
−52 kg	Nika Karabatić; Croatia	Iris Ducos; France	Valeryia Smychkova; Belarus
−55 kg	Laura Rodríguez; Spain	Darya Kostenevych; Ukraine	Julie Nguyen; France
−55 kg	Laura Rodríguez; Spain	Darya Kostenevych; Ukraine	Ivana Duvančić; Croatia
−59 kg	Sarah Chaari; Belgium	Luana Márton; Hungary	Neve McPhillie; Great Britain
−59 kg	Sarah Chaari; Belgium	Luana Márton; Hungary	Hatice Pınar Yiğitalp; Turkey
−63 kg	Vivana Márton; Hungary	Theopoula Sarvanaki; Greece	Vitaliya Lazuta; Belarus
−63 kg	Vivana Márton; Hungary	Theopoula Sarvanaki; Greece	Cloe Iglesias; Spain
−68 kg	Anastasiia Kosmycheva; Russia	Ainhoa García; Spain	Adele Williamson; Great Britain
−68 kg	Anastasiia Kosmycheva; Russia	Ainhoa García; Spain	Izabela Ranecká; Czech Republic
+68 kg	Polina Shvedkova; Russia	Nadina Mehmedović; Bosnia and Herzegovina	Sude Yaren Uzunçavdar; Turkey
+68 kg	Polina Shvedkova; Russia	Nadina Mehmedović; Bosnia and Herzegovina	Esmeralda Husovic; Germany
