= 2023 European U21 Taekwondo Championships =

International taekwondo competition

- Venue: Sala Polivalenta
- Location: Bucharest, Romania
- Dates: 7–10 December

The 2023 European U21 Taekwondo Championships, the 6th edition of the European U21 Taekwondo Championships, was held in Bucharest, Romania at the Polyvalent Hall from 7 to 10 December 2023.

== Medal table ==
* Host nation (Romania)

Rank	Nation	Gold	Silver	Bronze	Total
1	Turkey	5	1	6	12
2	Spain	5	1	4	10
3	Croatia	4	4	2	10
4	Hungary	1	1	0	2
5	Greece	1	0	2	3
6	Ukraine	0	2	4	6
7	Italy	0	1	3	4
8	Sweden	0	1	1	2
9	Bosnia and Herzegovina	0	1	0	1
9	Kosovo	0	1	0	1
9	Moldova	0	1	0	1
9	Netherlands	0	1	0	1
9	Slovenia	0	1	0	1
14	Azerbaijan	0	0	1	1
14	Belgium	0	0	1	1
14	Bulgaria	0	0	1	1
14	Cyprus	0	0	1	1
14	France	0	0	1	1
14	Germany	0	0	1	1
14	Montenegro	0	0	1	1
14	North Macedonia	0	0	1	1
14	Poland	0	0	1	1
14	Serbia	0	0	1	1
Totals (23 entries)		16	16	32	64

== Medal summary ==
=== Men ===
Event	Gold	Silver	Bronze
−54 kg	Iván Escolar Parra; Spain	Bleron Ademi; Kosovo	Kaan Yelaldı; Turkey
−54 kg	Iván Escolar Parra; Spain	Bleron Ademi; Kosovo	Konstantinos Dimitropoulos; Greece
−58 kg	Jesus Fraile; Spain	Teodoro Del Vecchio; Italy	Lev Korneev; Serbia
−58 kg	Jesus Fraile; Spain	Teodoro Del Vecchio; Italy	Samir Mirzoiev; Ukraine
−63 kg	Iker Abad Expósito; Spain	Volodymyr Bystrov; Ukraine	Daniele Biscosi; Italy
−63 kg	Iker Abad Expósito; Spain	Volodymyr Bystrov; Ukraine	Simur Mirzoiev; Ukraine
−68 kg	Berkay Erer; Turkey	Luka Raškovič; Slovenia	Stefan Stamenov; Bulgaria
−68 kg	Berkay Erer; Turkey	Luka Raškovič; Slovenia	Adrian Liste; Spain
−74 kg	Yiğithan Kılıç; Turkey	Juan Cánovas; Spain	Ante Kovac; Croatia
−74 kg	Yiğithan Kılıç; Turkey	Juan Cánovas; Spain	Andrii Chumachenko; Ukraine
−80 kg	Matej Nikolić; Croatia	Vito Krpan; Croatia	Oscar Kovačič; Croatia
−80 kg	Matej Nikolić; Croatia	Vito Krpan; Croatia	Mohamed Mendy; France
−87 kg	Josip Bilić; Croatia	Artem Harbar; Ukraine	Erik Farmakas; Sweden
−87 kg	Josip Bilić; Croatia	Artem Harbar; Ukraine	Rahmet Şimşek; Turkey
+87 kg	Sotiris Michopoulos; Greece	Dragos Marinescu; Moldova	Phillipos Dimitrakopoulos; Greece
+87 kg	Sotiris Michopoulos; Greece	Dragos Marinescu; Moldova	Petros Andreou; Cyprus

=== Women ===
Event	Gold	Silver	Bronze
−46 kg	Sofía García Marquina; Spain	Džejla Makaš; Bosnia and Herzegovina	Zemfira Hasanzade; Azerbaijan
−46 kg	Sofía García Marquina; Spain	Džejla Makaš; Bosnia and Herzegovina	Hayrunnisa Gürbüz; Turkey
−49 kg	Elif Öztabak; Turkey	Indra Bodén; Sweden	Ilenia Matonti; Italy
−49 kg	Elif Öztabak; Turkey	Indra Bodén; Sweden	Noa Romero; Spain
−53 kg	Mia Tukić; Croatia	Rüya Diler; Turkey	Senanur Çelik; Turkey
−53 kg	Mia Tukić; Croatia	Rüya Diler; Turkey	Zeynep Taşkın; Turkey
−57 kg	Aleyna Şenyurt; Turkey	Margarita Vukić; Croatia	Jada Van Wijngaarden; Spain
−57 kg	Aleyna Şenyurt; Turkey	Margarita Vukić; Croatia	Caroline Volders; Belgium
−62 kg	Viviana Márton; Hungary	Luana Márton; Hungary	Miljana Reljiḱ; North Macedonia
−62 kg	Viviana Márton; Hungary	Luana Márton; Hungary	Irene Montemuiño; Spain
−67 kg	Lena Moreno; Spain	Amy Mink; Netherlands	Giulia Maggiore; Italy
−67 kg	Lena Moreno; Spain	Amy Mink; Netherlands	Julia Nowak; Poland
−73 kg	Sude Yaren Uzunçavdar; Turkey	Mila Mastelić; Croatia	Andela Berišaj; Montenegro
−73 kg	Sude Yaren Uzunçavdar; Turkey	Mila Mastelić; Croatia	Sıla Nur Gençer; Turkey
+73 kg	Magdalena Matić; Croatia	Darija Željko; Croatia	Mariia Kuts; Ukraine
+73 kg	Magdalena Matić; Croatia	Darija Željko; Croatia	Esmeralda Husovic; Germany
