= Nodira Akhmedova =

Kazakhstani Taekwondo practitioner (born 2005)

Personal information
- Nationality: Kazakhstani
- Born: 21 December 2005 (age 20)

Sport
- Sport: Taekwondo
- Weight class: 49 kg
Medal record
Women's taekwondo
Representing Kazakhstan
World Championships
Bronze medal – third place	2025 Wuxi	49 kg
World University Games
Bronze medal – third place	2025 Rhine-Ruhr	49 kg

Nodira Akhmedova (born 21 December 2005) is a Kazakhstani taekwondo practitioner. She won a bronze medal at the 2025 World Taekwondo Championships.

== Career ==
In July 2025, Akhmedova competed at the 2025 Summer World University Games and won a bronze medal in the 49 kg event. In October 2025, she competed at the 2025 World Taekwondo Championships and won a bronze medal in the 49 kg event.
