= Feruza Sadikova =

Uzbekistani taekwondo practitioner

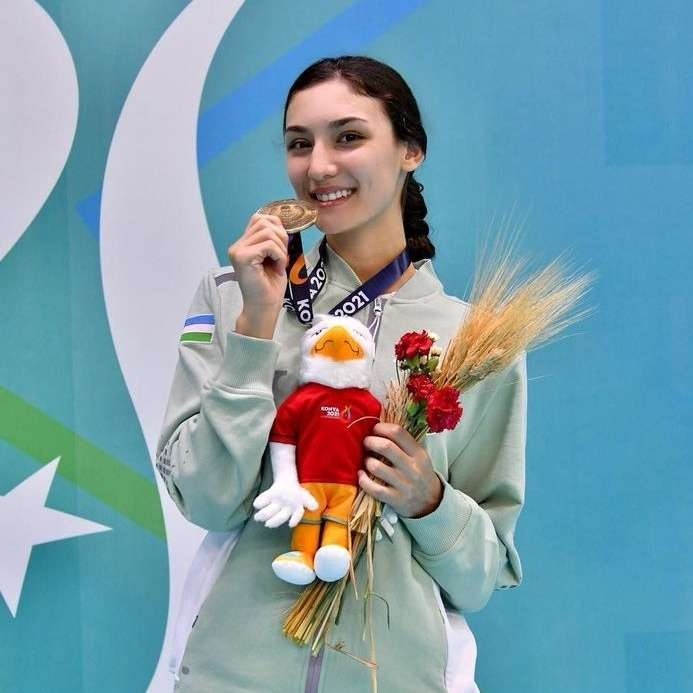
- Sadikova at 2021 Islamic Solidarity Games

Personal information
- Born: 23 April 2002 (age 24)

Sport
- Country: Uzbekistan
- Sport: Taekwondo
- Weight class: 62 kg
Medal record
Women's taekwondo
Representing Uzbekistan
World Championships
Bronze medal – third place	2022 Guadalajara	62 kg
Bronze medal – third place	2023 Baku	62 kg
Asian Games
Silver medal – second place	2022 Hangzhou	67 kg
Asian Championships
Gold medal – first place	2021 Beirut	62 kg
Silver medal – second place	2024 Da Nang	62 kg
Bronze medal – third place	2022 Chuncheon	62 kg
Military World Games
Bronze medal – third place	2019 Wuhan	62 kg
Islamic Solidarity Games
Gold medal – first place	2021 Konya	62 kg
World University Games
Silver medal – second place	2021 Chengdu	62 kg
Silver medal – second place	2021 Chengdu	Team

Feruza Sadikova (Uzbek: Феруза Садикова; born 23 April 2002) is an Uzbekistani taekwondo practitioner. In 2019, she won a bronze medal at the World Military Games, and in 2021, she won the Asian Taekwondo Championship. She has also won bronze medals twice at the World Championship, is a winner of the Islamic Solidarity Games, and a silver medalist at the Summer Asian Games.

== Biography ==
Feruza Sadikova was born on 23 April 2002, in Tashkent, Uzbekistan. She started practicing sports at a school-internat of the Olympic reserve in the city of Chirchik.

Since 2018, she has been participating in major sports competitions. In that year, she won the Uzbekistan Cup for the prizes of the Republic of Korea Ambassador in Uzbekistan. In 2019, she won a bronze medal at the World Military Games in the weight category up to 62 kg, held in Wuhan, China. In the same year, she competed in the World Taekwondo Championships in Manchester, the United Kingdom. In the first round, Sadikova defeated Natali Hamadi from Kuwait, but lost in the following round. She then won a bronze medal at the Asian Youth Taekwondo Championships . On June 18, 2021, at the Asian Taekwondo Championships in Beirut, Lebanon, Sadikova won the gold medal in the weight category up to 62 kg, defeating Chon Chhye from the Republic of Korea. In the same year, she won the "Beirut Open" international competition.

In 2022, Sadikova won the gold medal at the international tournament "Fujairah Open" . In the 1/8 finals at the Grand Prix in Rome, Italy, she lost to Caroline Santos from Brazil. However, she later won a bronze medal at the President's Cup of the Asian Taekwondo Federation. In June, she participated in the weight category up to 62 kg at the Asian Taekwondo Championships in the Korean city of Chuncheon. On June 25, in the semifinal match, she lost to Nastaran Valizade from Iran and won only a bronze medal.

In 2023, at the World Taekwondo Championships held in Baku, Azerbaijan, in the 62 kg category, Sadikova won a bronze medal. In October of the same year, in Hangzhou, China, at the Summer Asian Games in the weight category up to 67 kg, she won a silver medal, losing in the final to a Chinese athlete.

In 2024, Sadikova won the silver medal at the Asian Championships, losing to Thailand's Sasikarn Tongchan in the final.
