= Adele Williamson =

New Zealand biochemist

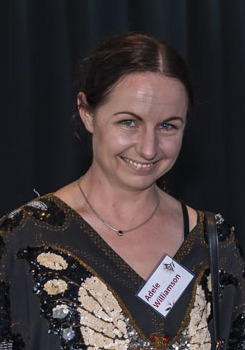
Williamson in 2020

Adele Williamson is a New Zealand biochemist who studies DNA repair systems in bacteria that inhabit extreme environments. Her research has applications in both biotechnology and medicine. She has travelled widely, including to Norway and Antarctica, to conduct her research and uses a variety of biochemical and bioinformatic methods to study the collected enzymes. She is currently a senior lecturer at the University of Waikato.

== Education ==
From 2000 to 2004, Williamson studied at the University of Canterbury in Christchurch, where she earned her Bachelor of Science (Honors) degree. She went on to undertake doctoral research at the Australian National University from 2004 to 2008, when she graduated with her PhD. She then completed a postdoctoral fellowship from January 2009 to March 2010 at Umeå Plant Science Centre in Sweden.

== Career ==
After her postdoctoral work at Umeå, Williamson began working as a research scientist at UiT The Arctic University of Norway in 2010, and was promoted to project leader in 2015. In 2019 she returned to New Zealand to work at the University of Waikato. She spent her first two years there working as a research fellow and principal investigator, before being appointed a senior lecturer in the Biomedical, and Molecular and Cellular Biology Departments.

While conducting research at various universities, Williamson has become a member of various societies. Most recently, she joined the Society of Crystallographers in Australia and New Zealand (SCANZ). In 2022, Williamson joined the Association of Polar Early Career Scientists where she works as a mentor to aspiring scientists. In 2021, she was admitted into the Maurice Wilkins Centre for Molecular Biodiscovery, which consists of established scientists in New Zealand whose research targets serious human diseases. Williamson has been a member of the New Zealand Society for Biochemistry and Molecular Biology since 2020.

== Research ==
Williamson's research focuses on bacteria known as extremophiles, organisms that survive in environmental extremes such as high pressures and temperatures. These organisms are of interest because they produce enzymes called extremozymes, which are functional under extreme conditions and are applicable in many different fields, including biotechnology and medicine. In biotechnology, extremozymes are essential for diagnostic tests such as PCR. Also, knowledge of these enzymes can help gain insight on how they help pathogens resist treatment in various diseases. The objectives of Williamson's research include:

1. To explore the fundamental biochemistry of survival under extreme conditions and understand what diverse mechanisms microbes have evolved to achieve this.
2. To explore the biotechnological potential of enzymes from extremophiles with a focus on novel molecular biology tools.

=== DNA repair proteins from Antarctic extremophiles ===
In 2019, Williamson was awarded the Marsden Fast-Start grant to investigate the DNA repair systems of various microbes living in Antarctica. The Dry Valleys of Antarctica were chosen because its environment subjects the DNA to multiple stressors including high ultraviolet light and multiple freeze-thaw cycles. During this research, Williamson and her team sequenced metagenomes from 30 sites across the Dry Valleys. The sequences from these samples were then analysed and compared to known databases. The research showed that although a large number of the genes present in these enzymes were already known, there were a select few that were either unique to the environment or were not represented in the database.

=== Replication and repair enzymes of Prochlorococcus marinus ===
In 2020, Williamson was awarded the Rutherford Discovery Fellowship for her research titled "In extremis: how bacteria replicate, repair and diversify their genomes in challenging environments". One of the bacterial systems Williamson and her team focused on during this research was the Prochlorococcus marinus. This group of cyanobacteria are the most abundant photosynthetic organism in the world. There are two ecotypes of P. marinus: those found in the upper ocean where the environment is UV-damaging and nutrient poor are considered high-light; and the low-light P. marinus, which have access to more nutrients and are subjected to less UV radiation. To conduct this research, the genomes from P. marinus were downloaded and the DNA ligases were identified. Prior to this research, it was believed that bacteria used NAD-dependent DNA ligases for replication, and archaea and eukaryotes utilise ATP-dependent DNA ligases. However, after analyzing the genomes of both high-light and low-light P. marinus, it was concluded that in the high-light bacteria an ATP-dependent DNA ligase is present instead of a NAD-dependent form. Williamson and her team suggest that this variation from typical bacterial replication enzymes could be an adaptation brought on by the extreme environmental conditions.

=== Research grants ===
- January 2023 - MBIE Smart Idea funding for a research project titled "A ligase-based solution for non-natural nucleic acid synthesis"
- July 2021 - Rutherford Discovery Fellowship for a research project titled "In extremis: how bacteria replicate, repair and diversify their genomes in challenging environments" by the Royal Society Te Apārangi.
- June 2021 - Explorer Grant for a research project titled "Extracellular DNA repair: a role in antimicrobial resistance?" from the Health Research Council of New Zealand.
- May 2019 - Marsden Fast-Start grant for a research project titled "DNA repair systems of the Antarctic microbial metagenome" from the Royal Society Te Apārangi.

== Selected publications ==
- Hjerde, Erik; Maguren, Ashleigh; Rzoska-Smith, Elizabeth; Kirby, Bronwyn; Williamson, Adele (14 May 2020). "DNA ligases of Prochlorococcus marinus: an evolutionary exception to the rules of replication". bioRxiv 10.1101/2020.05.11.089284.
- Rzoska-Smith, Elizabeth; Stelzer, Ronja; Monterio, Maria; Cary, Stephen C.; Williamson, Adele (2023). "DNA repair enzymes of the Antarctic Dry Valley metagenome". Frontiers in Microbiology. 14 1156817. doi:10.3389/fmicb.2023.1156817. PMC 10140301. PMID 37125210.
- Williamson, Adele; Conlan, Brendon; Hillier, Warwick; Wydrzynski, Tom (2011). "The evolution of Photosystem II: Insights into the past and future". Photosynthesis Research. 107 (1): 71–86. Bibcode:2011PhoRe.107...71W. doi:10.1007/s11120-010-9559-3. PMID 20512415.
- De Santi, Concetta; Willassen, Nils Peder; Williamson, Adele (2016). "Biochemical Characterization of a Family 15 Carbohydrate Esterase from a Bacterial Marine Arctic Metagenome". PLOS ONE. 11 (7) e0159345. Bibcode:2016PLoSO..1159345D. doi:10.1371/journal.pone.0159345. hdl:10037/10715. PMC 4951047. PMID 27433797.
- Jensen, Marianne S.; Fredriksen, Lasse; MacKenzie, Alasdair K.; Pope, Phillip B.; Leiros, Ingar; Chylenski, Piotr; Williamson, Adele K.; Christopeit, Tony; Østby, Heidi; Vaaje-Kolstad, Gustav; Eijsink, Vincent G. H. (2018). "Discovery and characterization of a thermostable two-domain GH6 endoglucanase from a compost metagenome". PLOS ONE. 13 (5) e0197862. Bibcode:2018PLoSO..1397862J. doi:10.1371/journal.pone.0197862. PMC 5968413. PMID 29795644.
- Williamson, Adele K. (2008). "Structural and functional aspects of the MSP (PsbO) and study of its differences in thermophilic versus mesophilic organisms". Photosynthesis Research. 98 (1–3): 365–389. Bibcode:2008PhoRe..98..365W. doi:10.1007/s11120-008-9353-7. PMID 18780158.
- Williamson, Adele; De Santi, Concetta; Altermark, Bjørn; Karlsen, Christian; Hjerde, Erik (2016). "Complete genome sequence of Halomonas sp. R5-57". Standards in Genomic Sciences. 11 (1): 62. Bibcode:2016SGenS..11...62W. doi:10.1186/s40793-016-0192-4. hdl:10037/10114. PMC 5015195. PMID 27610212.
- De Santi, Concetta; Gani, Osman Absm; Helland, Ronny; Williamson, Adele (2017). "Structural insight into a CE15 esterase from the marine bacterial metagenome". Scientific Reports. 7 (1): 17278. Bibcode:2017NatSR...717278D. doi:10.1038/s41598-017-17677-4. hdl:10037/12439. PMC 5722869. PMID 29222424.
- Bjerga, Gro Elin Kjæreng; Lale, Rahmi; Williamson, Adele Kim (2016). "Engineering low-temperature expression systems for heterologous production of cold-adapted enzymes". Bioengineered. 7 (1): 33–38. doi:10.1080/21655979.2015.1128589. hdl:10037/16717. PMC 4878266. PMID 26710170.
- Bjerga, Gro Elin Kjæreng; Williamson, Adele Kim (2015). "Cold shock induction of recombinant Arctic environmental genes". BMC Biotechnology. 15 78. doi:10.1186/s12896-015-0185-1. hdl:10037/8752. PMC 4544801. PMID 26286037.
