= Taekwondo at the 2023 European Games – Women's 62 kg =

Taekwondo competition

Women's 62 kg at the 2023 European Games
- Venue: Krynica-Zdrój Arena
- Date: 25 June
- Competitors: 16 from 16 nations

Medalists
gold medal	Sarah Chaâri	Belgium
silver medal	Petra Štolbová	Czech Republic
bronze medal	Aaliyah Powell	Great Britain
bronze medal	Jolanta Tarvida	Latvia

The women's 62 kg competition in taekwondo at the 2023 European Games took place on 25 June at the Krynica-Zdrój Arena.

== Schedule ==
All times are Central European Summer Time (UTC+2).

Date	Time	Event
Sunday, 25 June 2023	09:00	Round of 16
Sunday, 25 June 2023	14:00	Quarterfinals
Sunday, 25 June 2023	15:36	Semifinals
Sunday, 25 June 2023	16:24	Repechage
Sunday, 25 June 2023	19:00	Bronze medal bouts
Sunday, 25 June 2023	20:00	Final

== Results ==
Round of 16
Sarah Chaâri (BEL)	13	12
Tindra Andersson (SWE)	2	0
Jolanta Tarvida (LAT)	0	5	11
Nađa Savković (SRB)	2	4	8
Jone Magdaleno (ESP)	0	1
Aaliyah Powell (GBR)	3	5
Csenge Patakfalvy (HUN)	4	1
Julia Szpak (POL)	9	5
Petra Štolbová (CZE)	6	6	5
Cristina Gaspa (ITA)	7	5	2
Karoline Gjelsvik (NOR)	2	3
Milijana Reljikj (MKD)	9	8
Anna-Lena Frömming (GER)	8	10
Ivana Arelić (CRO)	8	14
Helmi Härkönen (FIN)	2	1
Theopoula Sarvanaki (GRE)	12	9

Quarterfinals
Sarah Chaâri (BEL)	3	7
Jolanta Tarvida (LAT)	0	1
Aaliyah Powell (GBR)	3	10
Julia Szpak (POL)	1	4
Petra Štolbová (CZE)	8	9	8
Milijana Reljikj (MKD)	3	10	8
Ivana Arelić (CRO)	13	8
Theopoula Sarvanaki (GRE)	5	6

Semifinals
Sarah Chaâri (BEL)	5	9
Aaliyah Powell (GBR)	1	6
Petra Štolbová (CZE)	8	6
Ivana Arelić (CRO)	7	6

Final
Sarah Chaâri (BEL)	5	4	13
Petra Štolbová (CZE)	5	6	7

=== Repechage ===
Repechage
Jolanta Tarvida (LAT)	12	8
Tindra Andersson (SWE)	0	6
Cristina Gaspa (ITA)	3	0	3
Milijana Reljikj (MKD)	0	2	11

Bronze medal bout
Ivana Arelić (CRO)	1	6	3
Jolanta Tarvida (LAT)	8	5	3
Milijana Reljikj (MKD)	4	0
Aaliyah Powell (GBR)	16	9
