= Aaliyah Powell =

British taekwondo practitioner (born 2002)

Personal information
- Nationality: British
- Born: 25 October 2002 (age 23)

Sport
- Sport: Taekwondo
Medal record
Women's taekwondo
Representing Great Britain
World Championships
Bronze medal – third place	2019 Manchester	53 kg
Bronze medal – third place	2022 Guadalajara	62 kg
Bronze medal – third place	2023 Baku	62 kg
Grand Slam
Bronze medal – third place	2023 Wuxi (Q)	67 kg
Grand Prix
Bronze medal – third place	2023 Paris	57 kg
Bronze medal – third place	2023 Manchester (F)	57 kg
European Games
Bronze medal – third place	2023 Kraków-Małopolska	62 kg
European Championships
Silver medal – second place	2024 Belgrade	62 kg
World Junior Championships
Gold medal – first place	2018 Hammamet	46 kg

Aaliyah Powell (born 25 October 2002 in Huddersfield) is a British taekwondo practitioner. Powell fought initially in the bantamweight competitions before moving up to lightweight. She has won World Championship bronze medals in both weight classes.

== Career ==
Powell began practising the martial arts taekwondo at age nine, after having competed in dance tournaments as a child.

She won a bronze medal in the women's senior 53 kg competition at the 2019 World Taekwondo Championships, after being defeated by Tatiana Kudashova in the semifinal. Three years later, she won another bronze at the 2022 World Taekwondo Championships, this time in the 62 weight class competition.

In 2023, she again won one of the bronze medals in the women's 62 kg event at the World Taekwondo Championships held in Baku. The same year, she won two bronze medals at Grand Prix competitions held in Paris and Manchester, respectively, as well as one bronze at the Grand Slam Qualifier, held in Wuxi.

== Personal life ==
Powell has passed her GCSEs. Since 2023, she is sponsored by Nike and is exploring careers in fashion and modelling.
