= Wafa Masghouni =

Tunisian taekwondo practitioner (born 2007)

Personal information
- Nationality: Tunisian
- Born: 11 December 2007 (age 18)

Sport
- Sport: Taekwondo
- Weight class: 62 kg
Medal record
Women's taekwondo
Representing Tunisia
World Championships
Gold medal – first place	2025 Wuxi	62 kg
World U21 Championships
Gold medal – first place	2025 Nairobi	62 kg
World Junior Championships
Gold medal – first place	2024 Chuncheon	63 kg
African Games
Gold medal – first place	2023 Accra	62 kg
Mediterranean Games
Silver medal – second place	2026 Taranto	67 kg

Wafa Masghouni (born 11 December 2007) is a Tunisian taekwondo practitioner. She won a gold medal at the 2025 World Taekwondo Championships.

== Career ==
Masghouni competed at the 2023 African Games and won a gold medal in the 62 kg category. She competed at the 2024 World Taekwondo Junior Championships and won a gold medal in the 63 kg category.

In October 2025, she competed at the 2025 World Taekwondo Championships and won a gold medal in the 62 kg category, defeating 2024 Summer Olympics champion Viviana Márton in the finals. Márton led throughout the first round, before Masghouni landed a body kick in the closing seconds to tie the score at 7–7 and win the round on connections. The second round remained scoreless, but she once again won the round on connections. This was the first women's gold medal for Tunisia at the World Taekwondo Championships. In December 2025, she competed at the 2025 World U21 Taekwondo Championships and won a gold medal in the 62 kg category.
