= Miljana Reljiḱ =

Macedonian taekwondo practitioner

Personal information
- Nationality: Macedonian
- Born: 23 May 2003 (age 23) Skopje, Macedonia

Sport
- Country: Macedonia
- Sport: Taekwondo
- Weight class: Featherweight
Medal record
Women's taekwondo
Representing North Macedonia
European U21 Championships
Bronze medal – third place	2023 Bucharest	62kg

Miljana Reljiḱ (Macedonian: Милјана Релиќ; born 23 May 2003) is a Macedonian taekwondo practitioner. She competed at the 2024 Paris Olympics.

== Career ==
She won a bronze medal at the 2023 European U21 Taekwondo Championships in the 62kg category in Bucharest in November 2023. She lost in the bronze medal match to Aaliyah Powell of Great Britain at the 2023 European Games in Poland, in the Women's 62kg.

She competed at the 2024 European Taekwondo Olympic Qualification Tournament in Sofia, Bulgaria, and qualified for the 2024 Olympic Games in the Women's −67 kg division.

Competing at the 2024 Summer Olympics in Paris she defeated two-time Olympic champion Jade Jones of Great Britain. She also had the honour of being a flag bearer for the country at the 2024 Summer Olympics Parade of Nations.
