= Caroline Santos =

Brazilian taekwondo practitioner (born 1996)

Personal information
- Full name: Caroline Gomes dos Santos
- Nationality: Brazilian
- Born: 6 February 1996 (age 30)
- Home town: São Caetano do Sul, Brazil
- Weight: 54 kg (119 lb)

Sport
- Sport: Taekwondo
- Team: Two Brothers Team
Medal record
Women's taekwondo
Representing Brazil
World Championships
Silver medal – second place	2019 Manchester	‍62 kg
Silver medal – second place	2023 Baku	‍62 kg
Pan American Games
Bronze medal – third place	2023 Santiago	Team
Pan American Championships
Gold medal – first place	2021 Cancún	62 kg
Gold medal – first place	2022 Punta Cana	62 kg

Caroline Gomes dos Santos (born 6 February 1996) is a Brazilian taekwondo athlete. She won a silver medal at the 2019 World Taekwondo Championships on the women's lightweights.
