= Petra Štolbová =

Czech taekwondo practitioner (born 2001)

Personal information
- Born: 29 June 2001 (age 25) Prague, Czech Republic

Sport
- Sport: Taekwondo
Medal record
Representing Czech Republic
European Games
Silver medal – second place	2023 Kraków-Małopolska	62 kg
European Championships
Silver medal – second place	2022 Manchester	62 kg
Bronze medal – third place	2024 Belgrade	62 kg
Bronze medal – third place	2026 Munich	62 kg
World University Games
Silver medal – second place	2025 Rhine-Ruhr	62 kg

Petra Štolbová (born 29 June 2001) is a Czech taekwondo practitioner.

== Life ==
Štolbová was born on 29 June 2001 in Prague.

== Career ==
She became European U21 Champion in 2019. In 2021, in Riyadh she won silver at the 2021 World Taekwondo Women's Open Championships in the 62 kg division. That year, she retained har title at the European U21 Championships.

She won a silver medal at the 2022 European Taekwondo Championships in Manchester in the 62 kg. She won bronze at the 2022 World Taekwondo Grand Prix event in Manchester in the 67 kg category in October 2022. She won a silver medal at the 2023 European Games in Poland in the Women's 62 kg.

She won a bronze medal at the 2024 European Taekwondo Championships in Belgrade in the Women's 62 kg. She qualified for the 2024 Paris Olympics competing in the +67kg.

She won a silver medal in the women's -62 kg category at the 2025 World University Games in Germany in July 2025.

In May 2026, she was a bronze medalist at the 2026 European Taekwondo Championships having faced Spaniard Elsa Secanell in the semi-final.
