= 2025 World Taekwondo Championships =

Taekwondo competition

- Venue: Taihu International Expo Center
- Location: Wuxi, China
- Dates: 24–30 October 2025
- Competitors: 853 from 145 nations

Champions
- Men: South Korea
- Women: Turkey

The 2025 World Taekwondo Championships was the 27th edition of the World Taekwondo Championships and was held in Wuxi, China from 24 to 30 October, 2025.

== Medal table ==
* Host nation (China)

Rank	Nation	Gold	Silver	Bronze	Total
1	Turkey	3	2	1	6
2	South Korea	2	2	2	6
3	Brazil	2	2	0	4
4	Tunisia	2	0	0	2
5	Iran	1	1	1	3
5	Uzbekistan	1	1	1	3
7	Hungary	1	1	0	2
8	Egypt	1	0	1	2
9	Belgium	1	0	0	1
9	Chinese Taipei	1	0	0	1
9	Thailand	1	0	0	1
–	Individual Neutral Atletes	0	3	2	5
12	China*	0	1	8	9
13	Italy	0	1	0	1
13	Ivory Coast	0	1	0	1
13	Saudi Arabia	0	1	0	1
16	Great Britain	0	0	2	2
16	Jordan	0	0	2	2
16	Kazakhstan	0	0	2	2
16	United States	0	0	2	2
20	Australia	0	0	1	1
20	Azerbaijan	0	0	1	1
20	Croatia	0	0	1	1
20	Greece	0	0	1	1
20	Nigeria	0	0	1	1
20	Poland	0	0	1	1
20	Spain	0	0	1	1
20	Ukraine	0	0	1	1
Totals (27 entries)		16	16	32	64

== Medal summary ==
=== Men ===
Event	Gold	Silver	Bronze
Finweight (−54 kg)	Seo Eun-su; South Korea	Furkan Ubeyde Çamoğlu; Turkey	Aristeidis Psarros; Greece
Finweight (−54 kg)	Seo Eun-su; South Korea	Furkan Ubeyde Çamoğlu; Turkey	Jakhongir Khudayberdiev; Uzbekistan
Flyweight (−58 kg)	Abolfazl Zandi; Iran	Georgii Gurtsiev; Individual Neutral Athletes	Huang Kefen; China
Flyweight (−58 kg)	Abolfazl Zandi; Iran	Georgii Gurtsiev; Individual Neutral Athletes	Gashim Magomedov; Azerbaijan
Bantamweight (−63 kg)	Mohamed Khalil Jendoubi; Tunisia	Mehdi Haji Mousaei; Iran	Mahmoud Al-Taryreh; Jordan
Bantamweight (−63 kg)	Mohamed Khalil Jendoubi; Tunisia	Mehdi Haji Mousaei; Iran	Jang Jun; South Korea
Featherweight (−68 kg)	Banlung Tubtimdang; Thailand	Seong Yu-hyeon; South Korea	Matija Črep; Croatia
Featherweight (−68 kg)	Banlung Tubtimdang; Thailand	Seong Yu-hyeon; South Korea	Maikol Rodriguez; United States
Lightweight (−74 kg)	Najmiddin Kosimkhojiev; Uzbekistan	Edival Pontes; Brazil	Amir Sina Bakhtiari; Iran
Lightweight (−74 kg)	Najmiddin Kosimkhojiev; Uzbekistan	Edival Pontes; Brazil	Magomed Abdusalamov; Individual Neutral Athletes
Welterweight (−80 kg)	Henrique Marques; Brazil	Xiang Qizhang; China	Seo Geon-woo; South Korea
Welterweight (−80 kg)	Henrique Marques; Brazil	Xiang Qizhang; China	Artem Mytarev; Individual Neutral Athletes
Middleweight (−87 kg)	Seif Eissa; Egypt	Simone Alessio; Italy	Szymon Piątkowski; Poland
Middleweight (−87 kg)	Seif Eissa; Egypt	Simone Alessio; Italy	Artem Harbar; Ukraine
Heavyweight (+87 kg)	Kang Sang-hyun; South Korea	Rafail Aiukaev; Individual Neutral Athletes	Jonathan Healy; United States
Heavyweight (+87 kg)	Kang Sang-hyun; South Korea	Rafail Aiukaev; Individual Neutral Athletes	Caden Cunningham; Great Britain

=== Women ===
Event	Gold	Silver	Bronze
Finweight (−46 kg)	Emine Göğebakan; Turkey	Milana Bekulova; Individual Neutral Athletes	Wang Shiyi; China
Finweight (−46 kg)	Emine Göğebakan; Turkey	Milana Bekulova; Individual Neutral Athletes	Aidana Kumartayeva; Kazakhstan
Flyweight (−49 kg)	Liu You-yun; Chinese Taipei	Elif Sude Akgül; Turkey	Fu Xiaolu; China
Flyweight (−49 kg)	Liu You-yun; Chinese Taipei	Elif Sude Akgül; Turkey	Nodira Akhmedova; Kazakhstan
Bantamweight (−53 kg)	Merve Dinçel; Turkey	Dunya Abutaleb; Saudi Arabia	Zhang Chuling; China
Bantamweight (−53 kg)	Merve Dinçel; Turkey	Dunya Abutaleb; Saudi Arabia	Jana Khattab; Egypt
Featherweight (−57 kg)	Maria Clara Pacheco; Brazil	Kim Yu-jin; South Korea	Luo Zongshi; China
Featherweight (−57 kg)	Maria Clara Pacheco; Brazil	Kim Yu-jin; South Korea	Fadia Khirfan; Jordan
Lightweight (−62 kg)	Wafa Masghouni; Tunisia	Viviana Márton; Hungary	Chen Ximin; China
Lightweight (−62 kg)	Wafa Masghouni; Tunisia	Viviana Márton; Hungary	Gabriella Blewitt; Australia
Welterweight (−67 kg)	Luana Márton; Hungary	Milena Titoneli; Brazil	Lena Moreno; Spain
Welterweight (−67 kg)	Luana Márton; Hungary	Milena Titoneli; Brazil	Elizabeth Anyanacho; Nigeria
Middleweight (−73 kg)	Sarah Chaâri; Belgium	Kimi Laurène Ossin; Ivory Coast	Zhou Zeqi; China
Middleweight (−73 kg)	Sarah Chaâri; Belgium	Kimi Laurène Ossin; Ivory Coast	Sude Yaren Uzunçavdar; Turkey
Heavyweight (+73 kg)	Nafia Kuş; Turkey	Svetlana Osipova; Uzbekistan	Mu Wenzhe; China
Heavyweight (+73 kg)	Nafia Kuş; Turkey	Svetlana Osipova; Uzbekistan	Lauren Williams; Great Britain

== Team ranking ==
=== Men ===
Rank	Team	Points
1	South Korea	370
2	Iran	226
3	Brazil	205
4	Uzbekistan	177
5	Egypt	143

=== Women ===
Rank	Team	Points
1	Turkey	471
2	Brazil	197
3	Hungary	189
4	China	179
5	Chinese Taipei	144
